= 2024–25 Coupe de France =

Football tournament season

Tournament details
- Country: France
- Dates: 11 May 2024 – 24 May 2025

Final positions
- Champions: Paris Saint-Germain (16th title)
- Runners-up: Reims

Tournament statistics
- Top goal scorer(s): Julien Domingues (9 goals)

The 2024–25 Coupe de France was the 108th season of the main football cup competition of France. The competition was organised by the French Football Federation (FFF) and is open to all clubs in French football, as well as clubs from the overseas departments and territories (Guadeloupe, French Guiana, Martinique, Mayotte, Tahiti, Réunion, Saint Martin, and Saint Pierre and Miquelon). Due to the 2024 New Caledonia unrest, clubs from New Caledonia did not participate in this year's competition.

The defending champions are Paris Saint-Germain, who defeated Lyon 2–1 in the previous year's final for a record-extending fifteenth Coupe de France title, and they successfully defended their title by beating Reims 3–0 in the final for a record-extending sixteenth Coupe de France title.

== Dates ==
Dates for the first two qualifying rounds, and any preliminaries required, were set by the individual Regional leagues. From round three, the FFF defined the calendar, with rounds up to and including the round of 32 being scheduled for weekends and later rounds up to, but not including, the final, taking place on midweek evenings.

Round	Dates
Third round	14 September 2024
Fourth round	28 September 2024
Fifth round	12 October 2024
Sixth round	26 October 2024
Seventh round	16 November 2024
Eighth round	30 November 2024
Round of 64	21 December 2024
Round of 32	15 January 2025
Round of 16	5 February 2025
Quarter-finals	26 February 2025
Semi-finals	2 April 2025
Final	24 May 2025

== Teams ==
=== Rounds 1 to 6 ===
The first six rounds, and any preliminaries required, were organised by the Regional Leagues and the Overseas Departments/Territories, who allowed teams from within their league structure to enter at any point up to the third round. Teams from Championnat National 3 entered at the third round, those from Championnat National 2 entered at the fourth round and those from Championnat National entered at the fifth round.

=== Number of teams per division and per round ===
Below is the number of teams per level according to the rounds.

Rounds► ▼Divisions	Regional Phase						Federal Phase		Final Phase					
Rounds► ▼Divisions	R1	R2	R3	R4	R5	R6	R7	R8	1/32	1/16	1/8	1/4	SF	F
L1 (1)	ø								18	13	8	4	2	2
L2 (2)	ø						18	15	13	7	3	2	1	
N1 (3)	ø				16 (Note: 17 clubs participate in the National, but LB Chateauroux is banned from playing.)	15	12	11	7	4	1			
N2 (4)	ø			48	40	32	27	20	10	4	2	2	1	
N3 (5)	ø	1 (Note: The first regional rounds from Paris-Île-de-France happen between May/June, so the club promoted to N3 was still playing in R1 at that time.)	110	96	80	64	43	21	9	4	2			
R1 (6)	ø	81	253	185	131	67	34	12	4					
R2 (7)	ø	528	418	279	150	67	21	5	1					
R3 (8)	297	827	564	274	116	43	13	2						
R4 (Note: Regional 4 only exists in Corsica as the last level: there is no departmental championship.) (9)	ø	3	2	ø										
D1 (9)	1104	934	468	185	53	15	1	ø						
D2 (10)	1595	873	297	96	25	5	2	ø						
D3 (11)	1293	499	131	32	6	1	1	ø						
D4 (12)	550	183	48	10	ø									
D5 (13)	241	61	11	1	ø									
D6 (14)	48	9	2	ø										
D7 (15)	9	2	1	ø										
D8 (16)	1	ø												
Others (Note: Refers to AS Montferrand Football, which is a U20 team.)	1	1	1	1	1	1	1	ø						
Overseas territories	ø		+1 (Note: Entrance of the team from Saint Pierre and Miquelon.)	ø			+2 (Note: Entrance of the teams from Tahiti and Mayotte. Tahiti to play at home. No teams from New Caledonia.)	2+4 (Note: Entrance of the teams from Réunion, Martinique, Guadeloupe e French Guiana.)	2	ø				
Total	5138	4001	2304	1208	620	310	175	92	64	32	16	8	4	2

=== Round 7 teams ===
The 155 qualified clubs from the 6th round are joined by the 18 Ligue 2 clubs as well as the overseas representatives of Mayotte and Tahiti. Due to the riots and its consequences, no club from New Caledonia participated in this edition.

Of the two overseas clubs entering the 7th round, only the club representing Tahiti, AS Dragon, plays at home against a mainland club according to the rule of biannual alternation (Métropole/Outre-Mer), the Mayotte representative, Diables Noirs, must travel to mainland France, Mayotte not having an approved stadium to host this type of meeting.

==== Overseas teams ====
A draw to determine the club which travels to Tahiti in Round 7, and then French Guiana, and Réunion in Round 8 takes place from a list of candidate clubs from mainland France, having expressed the wish to travel overseas while the Mayotte club is included in the main draw. Should an allocated team be knocked out in Round 7, the draw will move down the list to the next team, and this team will travel overseas. Overseas teams can only play one match at home against a mainland team, should they advance from Round 8 they will have to travel to France for the later rounds.

== Round 7 ==
The 173 teams are divided into nine distinct groups of equal level and geography to avoid long travel.

Due to the withdrawal of the New Caledonia representative, a drawn club received a bye from this round and directly qualified for the 8th round. This team was FC Rouen 1899.

=== Overseas playoff ties ===
2 Teams each from French Guiana, Guadeloupe, Martinique and Réunion will face each other internally to decide their respective representative for Round 8.

10 November 2024	Jeunesse Evolution (Guadeloupe)	0–0 (7–6 p)	(Guadeloupe) CS Moulien	Le Gosier, Guadeloupe
17:30 AST		Report		Stadium: Stade Roger Zami

23 November 2024	AS Étoile de Matoury (French Guiana)	3–0	(French Guiana) Aigles d'Or de Mana	Sinnamary, Guyane
				Stadium: Stade Omnisport; Referee: Jimy Baclet

17 November 2024	JS Saint-Pierroise (Réunion)	1–4	(Réunion) Saint-Denis FC	Saint-Pierre, Réunion
				Stadium: Stade Michel Volnay; Referee: Stephane Bruno Fontaine

16 November 2024	AS Samaritaine (Martinique)	1–2	(Martinique) RC Saint-Josep	Fort de France, Martinique
	Annette 45'		Barba 59'; Reuperné 90+4'	Stadium: Stade Pierre Aliker; Referee: François Merille

=== Overseas team hosting mainland team ===
This tie was drawn on 29 October 2024.

16 November 2024	AS Dragon (French Polynesia)	2–2 (4–2 p)	US Avranches MSM (4)	Pirae, Tahiti
		Report		Stadium: Stade Pater Te Hono Nui

=== Mainland ties ===
These ties were drawn on 30 October 2024 and include Diables Noirs travelling to France from Mayotte.

==== Group 7A ====
16 November 2024	SAS Épinal (4)	2–4	AS Nancy-Lorraine (3)
	Zinga 15'; Niang 41'		Bouriaud 18', 90'; Evans 51'; Dabasse 70' (pen.)

16 November 2024	FC Freyming (7)	0–4	SC Bastia (2)	Forbach
14:00 CET		Report	Cissé 43', 84'; Tomi 53'; Tramoni 78'	Stadium: Stade du Schlossberg; Referee: Remi Landry

16 November 2024	US Sarre-Union (5)	0–2	ES Thaon (5)
			Crouzier 49'; Petitpain 90+6'

16 November 2024	US Nousseviller (7)	0–3	SR Colmar (5)
			Tubio 45+1'; Keita 58'; Makang-Njem 84'

16 November 2024	CS Blénod (8)	0–1	FCSR Haguenau (4)

16 November 2024	CA Boulay (7)	0–3	US Thionville Lusitanos (4)
			Groune 3' (pen.), 5'; Moustaid 63'

16 November 2024	FCSR Obernai (7)	0–3	FC Metz (2)	Obernai
13:45 CET		Report	Sané 63'; Elisor 72'; Sané 90'	Stadium: Stade Municipal; Referee: William Toulliou

16 November 2024	US Raon-l'Étape (5)	1–1 (4–2 p)	ASC Biesheim (4)
			Hayef 14'

17 November 2024	FC Hettange Grande (7)	3–3 (3–4 p)	FC Lunéville (6)

17 November 2024	Association Still-Mutzig (6)	1–0	Illkirch Graffenstaden (6)

==== Group 7B ====
16 November 2024	JA Drancy (5)	2–1	US Pays de Cassel (5)
	Laplace 24', 34'		Burnel 47'

16 November 2024	CG Haubourdin (8)	1–7	Red Star FC (2)
	Baba 17' (pen.)		Cissé 15'; Escartin 34'; Corailler 45' (o.g.); Botella 49', 74'; Renel 70'; Ifnaoui 88'

16 November 2024	GC Lucciana (5)	2–1	Olympique Charleville Prix AM (5)
	Schuster 13'; Robic 19'		Kebe 86'

16 November 2024	Stade Béthunois (6)	0–0 (6–7 p)	USL Dunkerque (2)

16 November 2024	Arras FA (6)	0–2	Valenciennes FC (3)
			Masson 47'; Lilepo 80'

17 November 2024	US Pays de Saint-Omer (6)	1–1 (4–5 p)	US Noyelles-sous-Lens (7)

17 November 2024	RC Labourse (9)	0–4	FC 93 (4)
			Beziouen 33' (pen.); Traoré 76'; Owono 86', 90+2'

17 November 2024	FC Raismes (7)	0–5	Entente Feignies-Aulnoye (4)

17 November 2024	Etoile Club (8)	0–4	FCM Aubervilliers (4)

17 November 2024	RC Roubaix (7)	4–5	SFC Neuilly-sur-Marne (5)

==== Group 7C ====
15 November 2024	Paris FC (2)	1–1 (2–4 p)	Quevilly Rouen (3)	Paris
20:00 CET	Dicko 29'	Report	Dali Amar 17'	Stadium: Stade Sébastien Charléty; Referee: Pierre Gaillouste

16 November 2024	Houilles AC (6)	0–3	US Boulogne Côte d'Opale (3)	Houilles
14:00 CET		Report	Busin 22'; Rambaud 70'; Averlant 86'	Stadium: Stade Maurice Baquet; Referee: Steven Llewellyn

16 November 2024	AS Beauvais Oise (4)	1–0	US Chantilly (4)
	Nsikulu 47'

16 November 2024	US Crépy-en-Valois (8)	0–0 (2–4 p)	(Mayotte) Diables Noirs	Crépy-en-Valois
14:00 CET		Report		Stadium: Complexe Sportif Patrice Cauvin; Referee: Thomas Minier

16 November 2024	USC Corte (5)	1–1 (4–2 p)	ESA Linas-Montlhéry (5)	Corte
14:00 CET	Santelli 65'	Report	Mbala 45+1'	Stadium: Stade Santos-Manfredi; Referee: Arnaud Baert

16 November 2024	FC Fleury 91 (4)	1–1 (3–5 p)	Amiens SC (2)
	Koffi 22'		Dao 70'

16 November 2024	Calais Beau Marais (6)	3–1	AC Paris 15 (7)

17 November 2024	FC Liancourt-Clermont (7)	0–0 (4–3 p)	CS Brétigny (5)

17 November 2024	CO Les Ulis (6)	1–3	RC Calais (5)

17 November 2024	Le Touquet ACFCO (8)	1–1 (5–4 p)	Portugais d'Amiens (6)

==== Group 7D ====
16 November 2024	Ruffiac Malestroit Foot (7)	0–2	FC Lorient (2)
			Laporte 16', 64'

16 November 2024	Vannes OC (5)	1–2	Le Mans FC (3)
	Piquionne 62' (pen.)		Rabillard 32'; Calodat 76'

16 November 2024	SC Locminé (4)	4–2	Sablé FC (5)
	Soufache 10'; Belhaj 20'; Bila 84', 90'		Nowa 48'; Monnier 68'

16 November 2024	AS Vitré (5)	0–0 (4–5 p)	Stade Lavallois (2)

16 November 2024	Olympique Saumur (4)	0–2	US Concarneau (3)
			Sery 21'; Soukouna 62'

16 November 2024	US Montagnarde (6)	1–1 (3–4 p)	Tours FC (6)
	Souare 5'		Randazzo 43'

16 November 2024	OC Cesson (5)	2–2 (3–1 p)	TA Rennes (5)

17 November 2024	FC Fief-Gesté (10)	1–3	US Monnaie (6)
			Leblois 13'; Besnier 38'; Lancien 75'

==== Group 7E ====
FC Rouen 1899 (3)	v	bye

16 November 2024	AS Ginglin-Cesson (6)	2–0	US Alençon (5)	Saint-Brieuc
	Diarra 32'; Marie-Rose 86'	Report		Stadium: Stade de l'Europe; Referee: Félicien Gazon

16 November 2024	C'Chartres Football (5)	0–4	SM Caen (2)	Chartres
13:45 CET		Report	Brahimi 3', 39'; Le Bihan 7'; Mendy 23'	Stadium: Stade Jacques-Couvret; Referee: Pierre Retail

16 November 2024	SP Milizac (5)	1–1 (2–3 p)	Dinan Léhon FC (4)

16 November 2024	FC Serquigny Nassandres (7)	0–5	EA Guingamp (2)
			Sagna 44', 65'; Guendouz 46' (pen.); Hemia 55'; Picard 85' (pen.)

16 November 2024	FC Saint-Lô Manche (5)	1–1 (4–5 p)	SU Dives-Cabourg (5)
	Fofana 85'		Bekombo 15'

17 November 2024	Maladrerie OS (6)	1–2	US Bolbec (6)
	Laigneau 72'		Yamba 3'; Leroux 45+4'

17 November 2024	Stade Paimpolais FC (7)	0–3	Stade Briochin (4)
			Beghin 43'; Janno 68'; Ntumi 90+2'

17 November 2024	Club Olympique Briochin (6)	1–2	US Saint-Malo (4)

==== Group 7F ====
15 November 2024	Les Herbiers VF (4)	2–1	AC Ajaccio (2)	Les Herbiers
19:00 CET	Guillaume 90', 90+5' (pen.)	Report	Bamba 34'	Stadium: Stade Massabielle; Referee: Benjamin Lepaysant

16 November 2024	Saint-Philbert La Réorthe La Jaudonnière (11)	0–6	SA Mérignac (6)

16 November 2024	Chamois Niort (8)	0–3	US Orléans (3)
			Lallias 56'; Sila 61' (pen.); Cartillier 78'

16 November 2024	Cazaux Olympique (8)	0–6	La Roche VF (4)
			Vrignon 10', 56'; Villette 13', 21', 85'; Diallo 89'

16 November 2024	US Philibertine (5)	3–0	Thouars Foot 79 (6)
	Souley 15'; Blanquet 58', 87'

16 November 2024	Aviron Bayonnais (5)	1–3	Pau FC (2)	Bayonne
	Giacomini 43'	Report	Boutaïb 5'; Mboup 41', 55'	Stadium: Stade Didier Deschamps; Referee: Samir Zolota

16 November 2024	Vendée Fontenay Foot (5)	1–2	ESOFV La Roche-sur-Yon (5)
	Da Silva 68'		Godet 41'; Macouin 52'

17 November 2024	FC Bressuire (6)	0–2	FC Girondins de Bordeaux (4)
			Diaby 11'; Karim 74'

17 November 2024	ES Beaumont Saint-Cyr (7)	1–0	FCE Mérignac-Arlac (6)
	Maitre 50'

17 November 2024	Etoile Maritime FC (7)	0–3; Awarded	USSA Vertou (5)

==== Group 7G ====
15 November 2024	Angoulême Charente FC (4)	2–1	Rodez AF (2)	Angoulême
20:00 CET	Venot 42'; Chauvier 76'		Bentayeb 90'	Stadium: Stade Lebon; Referee: Ruddy Buquet

16 November 2024	US Colomiers (5)	2–2 (3–5 p)	Vierzon FC (5)

16 November 2024	CS Feytiat (6)	0–3	Clermont Foot 63 (2)
			Baaloudj 8'; Diop 59'; Magnin 90+3'

16 November 2024	FC Espaly (5)	1–0	AF Biars Bretenoux (6)
	Ichane 75' (pen.)

16 November 2024	Canet Roussillon FC (5)	1–3	FC Versailles 78 (3)
			Baghdadi 64'; Kodjia 78'; Mbemba 83' (pen.)

16 November 2024	RCO Agde (5)	1–1 (9–8 p)	SO Romorantin (5)
			Moutiapoulle 84'

16 November 2024	FC Comtal (7)	0–2	Le Puy Foot 43 (4)
			Adelaide 11', 70'

17 November 2024	Avenir Mourenxois (8)	0–3	FC Marmande 47 (7)

17 November 2024	USE Couzeix-Chaptelat (7)	1–0	Sauveteurs Brivois (8)
	Faucher 37'

17 November 2024	AS Montferrand Football (6)	0–4	L'Union Saint-Jean FC (6)

==== Group 7H ====
16 November 2024	Grenoble Foot 38 (2)	1–1 (10–9 p)	FC Villefranche Beaujolais (3)
	Ba 58'		Diakité 69'

16 November 2024	Istres FC (4)	4–0	ES Cannet-Rocheville (5)

16 November 2024	ES Grau-du-Roi (6)	0–2	AS Cannes (4)
			Trinker 47'; Mambu 70'

16 November 2024	Olympique d'Alès (5)	4–2	Stade Beaucairois (5)

16 November 2024	Valence FC (8)	1–0	Marignane GCB FC (4)

16 November 2024	AS St-Just St-Rambert (8)	0–4	FC Bourgoin-Jallieu (5)
			Kohser 4'; Bozkurt 57', 82'; Tchangodei 87'

17 November 2024	FC Allobroges Asafia (7)	0–5	FC Martigues (2)
			Mendy 35'; Ouotro 52'; Gautier 55'; Zouaoui 57'; Tilili 90+3' (pen.)

17 November 2024	Olympique de Valence (6)	1–0	AC Arles (6)
	Boudjera 32'

17 November 2024	Lempdes SF (7)	0–1	Carnoux FC (6)

17 November 2024	SC Anduze (8)	1–3	Hauts Lyonnais (5)

==== Group 7I ====
16 November 2024	GFA Rumilly Vallières (4)	1–0	Jura Dolois Football (5)
	Fortier 70'

16 November 2024	Chaumont FC (6)	2–3	GOAL FC (4)
	Dufant 44'; Collin 76'		Assef 17'; Dufau 19'; Fichten 25'

16 November 2024	FC Grandvillars (6)	2–4	Dijon FCO (3)
	Evsan 43'; Vora 54'		Djae 9'; Ikanga 64' (pen.), 72'; Hamada 81'

16 November 2024	FC Foron (7)	1–3	ES Troyes AC (2)
			Adeline 38'; de Préville 70'; Irié 86'

16 November 2024	ESB Marboz (8)	0–1	Cluses Scionzier FC (6)

16 November 2024	AS Genouilleux Guéreins Montceaux (10)	0–4	UF Mâcon (5)
			Guirassy 26', 35'; Taufflieb 46'; Bouchet 90'

16 November 2024	FC Gueugnon (5)	1–3	FC Sochaux-Montbéliard (3)
	Luanda 62'		Mendes Da Silva 26'; Lecolier 41'; Gnanduillet 90'

16 November 2024	FC Vesoul (6)	1–6	FC Annecy (2)
	Essogo 66'		Dago 2', 65'; Pajot 19'; Ntignee 59', 76', 90'

17 November 2024	Chambéry Savoie Football (5)	2–1	FC Saint-Cyr Collonges (6)

17 November 2024	FC Valdahon Vercel (6)	0–4	Jura Sud Foot (4)
			Dihad 27'; Baradji 45'; Sayari 75'; Mountou 79'

== Round 8 ==
The winners of Round 7, along with FC Rouen 1899 (who received a bye) are divided into nine distinct groups. The matches are scheduled to be played from 29 November to 1 December, except for the match between USC Corte and Mayotte team Diables Noirs, which was played on 20 November. USSA Vertou was given a technical win in their Round 7 match with Etoile Maritime FC; as a result, US Philibertine, who were initially designated to travel overseas during the draw, will host Pau FC.

=== Group 8A ===
29 November 2024	SC Bastia (2)	2–0	AS Nancy-Lorraine (3)
	Boutrah 10' (pen.), 85'

29 November 2024	US Raon-l'Étape (5)	0–1	FC Metz (2)
			Deminguet 34'

30 November 2024	Association Still-Mutzig (6)	4–1	(Guadeloupe) Jeunesse Évolution
	Schall 11', 14', 74'; Loos 34'

30 November 2024	SR Colmar (5)	1–1 (3–4 p)	FCSR Haguenau (4)

1 December 2024	FC Lunéville (6)	0–4	ES Thaon (5)

30 November 2024	AS Étoile de Matoury (French Guiana)	0–2	US Thionville Lusitanos (4)

=== Group 8B ===
30 November 2024	Valenciennes FC (3)	4–3	SFC Neuilly-sur-Marne (5)

30 November 2024	FC 93 (4)	2–2 (4–2 p)	Red Star FC (2)
	Konté 30'; Keita 49'		Hachem 44'; Durivaux 90+4'

30 November 2024	FCM Aubervilliers (4)	0–2	USL Dunkerque (2)
			Courtet 85'; Sekongo 90+2'

1 December 2024	Entente Feignies Aulnoye FC (4)	1–0	GC Lucciana (5)

1 December 2024	US Noyelles-sous-Lens (7)	0–3	JA Drancy (5)

=== Group 8C ===
20 November 2024	USC Corte (5)	2–0	(Mayotte) Diables Noirs
	Tamboura 85'; Boussemart 90+9'

29 November 2024	Calais Beau Marais (6)	0–3	Amiens SC (2)
			Mafouta 58'; Dao 73'; Lutin 87'

30 November 2024	FC Liancourt-Clermont (7)	0–1	Quevilly Rouen (3)
			Tshipamba 20'

30 November 2024	Le Touquet AC (8)	0–1	RC Calais (5)

1 December 2024	US Boulogne Côte d'Opale (3)	4–2	AS Beauvais Oise (4)

=== Group 8D ===
30 November 2024	US Monnaie (6)	0–5	FC Lorient (2)
			Tosin 5'; Ponceau 28'; Pagis 38'; Baldoni 68'; Kroupi 90'

30 November 2024	Stade Lavallois (2)	2–2 (5–3 p)	US Concarneau (3)
	Camara 14'; Thomas 86'		Séry 40'; Jannez 90+3'

30 November 2024	Le Mans FC (3)	4–0	SC Locminé (4)

30 November 2024	Tours FC (6)	3–0	OC Cesson (5)

=== Group 8E ===
29 November 2024	Stade Briochin (4)	0–0 (5–4 p)	US Saint-Malo (4)

30 November 2024	US Bolbec (6)	0–6	SM Caen (2)
			Le Bihan 21'; Autret 48'; Kyeremeh 58', 88'; Mendy 65'; Brahimi 76'

30 November 2024	Dinan Léhon FC (4)	1–4	EA Guingamp (2)

30 November 2024	AS Ginglin-Cesson (6)	0–3	FC Rouen 1899 (3)

30 November 2024	SU Dives-Cabourg (5)	6–1	(French Polynesia) AS Dragon

=== Group 8F ===
29 November 2024	US Orléans (3)	1–1 (2–4 p)	La Roche VF (4)
	Testud 63'		Diallo 85'

30 November 2024	US Philibertine (5)	1–1 (4–1 p)	Pau FC (2)
	Steven 1'

30 November 2024	SA Mérignac (6)	1–1 (4–2 p)	ES Beaumont Saint-Cyr (7)

30 November 2024	ESOFV La Roche-sur-Yon (5)	1–3	(Martinique) RC Saint-Joseph

1 December 2024	Saint-Denis FC (Réunion)	0–0 (5–4 p)	USSA Vertou (5)

1 December 2024	FC Girondins de Bordeaux (4)	2–0	Les Herbiers VF (4)

=== Group 8G ===
30 November 2024	Angoulême Charente FC (4)	1–2	Clermont Foot 63 (2)
	Venot 4'		Diagouraga 39'; Diaby 70'

30 November 2024	RCO Agde (5)	1–5	Le Puy Foot 43 (4)

30 November 2024	L'Union Saint-Jean FC (6)	2–1	FC Versailles 78 (3)

30 November 2024	FC Marmande 47 (7)	3–0; Awarded	Vierzon FC (5)

1 December 2024	USE Couzeix-Chaptelat (7)	0–3	FC Espaly (5)
			Fournel 25'; Roussey 90+3'; Ichane 90+5' (pen.)

=== Group 8H ===
30 November 2024	Istres FC (4)	0–4	Grenoble Foot 38 (2)

30 November 2024	Olympique d'Alès (5)	1–5	AS Cannes (4)

30 November 2024	Valence FC (8)	0–2	FC Martigues (2)

30 November 2024	FC Bourgoin-Jallieu (5)	3–0	Olympique de Valence (6)

30 November 2024	Carnoux FC (6)	0–1	Hauts Lyonnais (5)

=== Group 8I ===
29 November 2024	Chambéry Savoie Football (5)	0–2	Dijon FCO (3)
			Djae 48'; Ben Fredj 90+3'

30 November 2024	Jura Sud Foot (4)	0–0 (5–6 p)	FC Annecy (2)

30 November 2024	GFA Rumilly-Vallières (4)	1–1 (3–4 p)	GOAL FC (4)

30 November 2024	Cluses Scionzier FC (6)	0–1	ES Troyes AC (2)

30 November 2024	UF Mâcon (5)	0–2	FC Sochaux-Montbéliard (3)

== Round of 64 ==
The round of 64 draw was split into three groups, roughly by geography, with Ligue 1 teams distributed evenly. The draw was made on 2 December 2024.

=== Group A ===
20 December 2024	Espaly (5)	1–1 (4–3 p)	Dijon (3)	Espaly-Saint-Marcel
20:45	Gjeçi 74'	Report	Lembezat 70'	Stadium: Stade du Viouzou; Attendance: 884; Referee: Faouzi Benchabane

20 December 2024	GOAL FC (4)	1–2	Annecy (2)	Chasselay
20:45	Bennekrouf 53'	Report	Drouhin 32'; Tanard 90+3' (o.g.)	Stadium: Stade Ludovic Giuly; Attendance: 1,781; Referee: Hakim Ben El Hadj

21 December 2024	Cannes (4)	3–2	Grenoble (2)	Cannes
15:30	Domingues 9', 19'; N'Doye 39'	Report	Valls 12'; Zahui 90+1'	Stadium: Stade Pierre de Coubertin; Attendance: 1,818; Referee: Antoine Valnet

21 December 2024	Bourgoin-Jallieu (5)	4–1	Martigues (2)	Bourgoin-Jallieu
15:30	Kohser 3', 26'; Bozkurt 11', 65'	Report	Siby 23'	Stadium: Stade Pierre Rajon; Attendance: 2,850; Referee: Geoffrey Kubler

21 December 2024	Hauts Lyonnais (5)	0–0 (2–4 p)	Toulouse (1)	Feurs
15:30		Report		Stadium: Stade Maurice-Rousson; Attendance: 1,825; Referee: Mikael Lesage

21 December 2024	Corte (5)	1–1 (3–5 p)	Nice (1)	Furiani
18:00	Boussemart 11'	Report	Ndombele 60'	Stadium: Stade Armand-Cesari; Attendance: 4,591; Referee: Abdelatif Kherradji
	Penalties
	Machado (penalty scored); Fonovich (penalty scored); Tamboura (penalty scored); Perotto (penalty missed)		(penalty scored) Laborde; (penalty scored) Ndombele; (penalty scored) Diop; (penalty scored) Bouanani; (penalty scored) Clauss

21 December 2024	Le Puy Foot (4)	4–0	Montpellier (1)	Espaly-Saint-Marcel
18:00	Zogba 43'; Pays 75', 90+1'; Diebold 79'	Report		Stadium: Stade Charles Massot; Attendance: 3,226; Referee: Jérémie Pignard

22 December 2024	Saint-Étienne (1)	0–4	Marseille (1)	Saint-Étienne
14:45		Report	Greenwood 22'; Rabiot 34'; Luis Henrique 69'; Højbjerg 81'	Stadium: Stade Geoffroy-Guichard; Attendance: 34,547; Referee: Jérémy Stinat

22 December 2024	L'Union Saint-Jean (6)	1–4	Monaco (1)	Toulouse
14:45	Tournier 82'	Report	Ben Seghir 21'; Vanderson 37'; Teze 65'; Ilenikhena 90'	Stadium: Stadium de Toulouse; Attendance: 20,577; Referee: Olivier Thual

22 December 2024	Sochaux (3)	0–0 (5–3 p)	Clermont (2)	Montbéliard
17:30		Report		Stadium: Stade Auguste-Bonal; Attendance: 10,660; Referee: Willy Delajod

=== Group B ===
20 December 2024	Troyes (2)	3–0	Metz (2)	Troyes
20:45	Ripart 28', 85'; Irié 71'	Report		Stadium: Stade de l'Aube; Attendance: 4,479; Referee: Clément Turpin

20 December 2024	Haguenau (4)	4–1	Boulogne (3)	Haguenau
20:45	Gouletquer 6', 68'; Lawson 21', 45'	Report	Dabo 90+2'	Stadium: Parc des Sports de Haguenau; Attendance: 918; Referee: Rémi Landry

20 December 2024	Bastia (2)	5–0	(Martinique) RC Saint-Joseph	Furiani
20:45	Tramoni 24'; Rodrigues 25'; Guidi 30'; Boutrah 45+1'; Janneh 76'	Report		Stadium: Stade Armand-Cesari; Attendance: 2,038; Referee: Ahmed Taleb

20 December 2024	Rouen (3)	0–1	Lille (1)	Le Petit-Quevilly
21:00		Report	Ismaily 22'	Stadium: Stade Robert Diochon; Attendance: 8,016; Referee: Stéphanie Frappart

21 December 2024	Entente Feignies Aulnoye (4)	1–2	Lyon (1)	Valenciennes
18:00	Koubemba 90+4'	Report	Benrahma 44'; Mikautadze 88'	Stadium: Stade du Hainaut; Attendance: 10,219; Referee: Gaël Angoula

21 December 2024	Thaon (5)	2–1	Amiens (2)	Thaon-les-Vosges
18:00	Petitpain 47'; Lecoanet 85'	Report	Urhoghide 20'	Stadium: Stade Robert Sayer; Attendance: 1,549; Referee: Mickaël Leleu

21 December 2024	Drancy (5)	0–4	Nantes (1)	Saint-Ouen-sur-Seine
18:00		Report	Abline 21', 33'; Zézé 63'; Mohamed 83'	Stadium: Stade Bauer; Attendance: 3,718; Referee: Florent Batta

21 December 2024	Calais (5)	0–3	Strasbourg (1)	Calais
21:00		Report	Andrey Santos 57'; Mara 73', 89'	Stadium: Stade de l'Épopée; Attendance: 9,426; Referee: Thierry Bouille

22 December 2024	Still-Mutzig (6)	1–3	Reims (1)	Molsheim
14:45	Schall 60'	Report	Gabriel Moscardo 8'; Diakhon 66'; Sangui 76'	Stadium: Stade Parc des Sports; Attendance: 2,315; Referee: Pierre Gaillouste

22 December 2024	Auxerre (1)	0–1	Dunkerque (2)	Auxerre
14:45		Report	Bardeli 26'	Stadium: Stade de l'Abbé Deschamps; Attendance: 8,189; Referee: Romain Lissorgue

22 December 2024	US Thionville Lusitanos (4)	2–2 (4–5 p)	Valenciennes (3)	Thionville
17:30	Omosanya 48'; Vitoux 90+7'	Report	Lilepo 14'; Woudenberg 74'	Stadium: Stade de Guentrange; Attendance: 2,413; Referee: Benjamin Lepaysant

=== Group C ===
20 December 2024	Mérignac (6)	0–0 (3–4 p)	Laval (2)	Mérignac
20:45		Report		Stadium: Stade Robert Brettes; Attendance: 3,227; Referee: Karim Abed

21 December 2024	La Roche (4)	0–1	Brest (1)	La Roche-sur-Yon
15:30		Report	Ajorque 41'	Stadium: Stade Henri Desgrange; Attendance: 4,530; Referee: Aurélien Petit

21 December 2024	Stade Briochin (4)	1–0	Le Havre (1)	Saint-Brieuc
15:30	Janno 80'	Report		Stadium: Stade Fred-Aubert; Attendance: 4,025; Referee: Guillaume Paradis

21 December 2024	Dives-Cabourg (5)	2–0	(Réunion) Saint-Denis	Dives-sur-Mer
15:30	Fontaine 59'; Bekombo 75'	Report		Stadium: Stade André Heurtematte; Attendance: 1,731; Referee: Eddy Rosier

22 December 2024	Bordeaux (4)	1–4	Rennes (1)	Bordeaux
14:45	Bahassa 18'	Report	Truffert 29'; James 59'; Assignon 75'; Kalimuendo 79'	Stadium: Matmut Atlantique; Attendance: 19,877; Referee: Bastien Dechepy

22 December 2024	Guingamp (2)	2–1	Caen (2)	Guingamp
17:30	Luvambo 80'; Picard 90+2'	Report	Mendy 86'	Stadium: Stade de Roudourou; Attendance: 7,350; Referee: Jérôme Brisard

22 December 2024	FC 93 (4)	0–1	Angers (1)	Bobigny
17:30		Report	Lepaul 66'	Stadium: Stade Auguste-Delaune; Attendance: 1,506; Referee: Mathieu Vernice

22 December 2024	Saint-Philbert-de-Grand-Lieu (5)	0–2	Quevilly-Rouen (3)	Challans
17:30		Report	Tshipamba 82', 87'	Stadium: Stade Jean Léveillé; Attendance: 2,361; Referee: Azzedine Souifi

22 December 2024	Marmande (7)	0–7	Le Mans (3)	Marmande
17:30		Report	Lauray 5'; Rabillard 11'; Voyer 33'; Vula 36', 50', 54'; Matumona 84'	Stadium: Stade Georges-Dartiailh; Attendance: 2,467; Referee: Alexandre Perreau Niel

22 December 2024	Lens (1)	1–1 (3–4 p)	Paris Saint-Germain (1)	Lens
21:00	Nzola 66'	Report	Ramos 70'	Stadium: Stade Bollaert-Delelis; Attendance: 38,182; Referee: Thomas Léonard
	Penalties
	Frankowski (penalty scored); Sotoca (penalty scored); El Aynaoui (penalty scored); Nzola (penalty missed); Diouf (penalty missed)		(penalty scored) Vitinha; (penalty scored) Ramos; (penalty scored) Dembélé; (penalty scored) Barcola

Cancelled	Tours (6)	0–3; Awarded	Lorient (2)	Tours
		Report		Stadium: Stade de la Vallée du Cher; Referee: Pierre Legat

== Round of 32 ==
The draw was made on 22 December 2024. Ties took place between 14 and 15 January 2025 with the exception of Haguenau versus Dunkerque, which was postponed to 22 January.

14 January 2025	Bastia (2)	0–1	Nice (1)	Furiani
20:45		Report	Moukoko 61'	Stadium: Stade Armand-Cesari; Attendance: 9,299; Referee: Benoît Bastien

14 January 2025	Dives-Cabourg (5)	1–0	Le Puy Foot (4)	Dives-sur-Mer
20:45	Suzanne 66'	Report		Stadium: Stade André Heurtematte; Attendance: 1,800; Referee: Aurélien Petit

14 January 2025	Le Mans (3)	1–1 (4–3 p)	Valenciennes (3)	Le Mans
20:45	Vula 29'	Report	Oyewusi 82'	Stadium: Stade Marie-Marvingt; Attendance: 5,509; Referee: Florent Batta
	Penalties
	Eyoum (penalty scored); Rabillard (penalty missed); Gueye (penalty scored); Burlet (penalty scored); Oggad (penalty scored)		(penalty missed) Camblan; (penalty scored) Oyewusi; (penalty missed) Lilepo; (penalty scored) Sissoko; (penalty scored) Buadés

14 January 2025	Guingamp (2)	2–2 (9–8 p)	Sochaux (3)	Guingamp
20:45	Riou 38'; Guendouz 59'	Report	Fontaine 12'; Gnanduillet 45'	Stadium: Stade de Roudourou; Attendance: 3,951; Referee: Pierre Gaillouste
	Penalties
	Louiserre (penalty scored); Siwe (penalty scored); Hemia (penalty missed); Sidibé (penalty scored); Riou (penalty missed); Lemonnier (penalty scored); Maronnier (penalty scored); Naïr (penalty scored); Mendes (penalty scored); Niasse (penalty scored); Louiserre (penalty scored)		(penalty missed) Michel; (penalty scored) Fontaine; (penalty scored) Dacosta; (penalty missed) Joseph; (penalty scored) Mayela; (penalty scored) Mukanya; (penalty scored) Bayanginisa; (penalty scored) Loubao; (penalty scored) Mouyema; (penalty scored) Patouillet; (penalty missed) Fontaine

14 January 2025	Reims (1)	1–1 (3–1 p)	Monaco (1)	Reims
20:45	Kipré 45'	Report	Salisu 70'	Stadium: Stade Auguste-Delaune; Attendance: 10,665; Referee: Gaël Angoula
	Penalties
	Nakamura (penalty scored); Salama (penalty scored); Kipré (penalty missed); Diakité (penalty scored)		(penalty missed) Caio Henrique; (penalty missed) Biereth; (penalty missed) Camara; (penalty scored) Embolo

14 January 2025	Marseille (1)	1–1 (3–4 p)	Lille (1)	Marseille
21:10	Luis Henrique 90+6'	Report	Haraldsson 68'	Stadium: Stade Vélodrome; Attendance: 61,954; Referee: Clément Turpin
	Penalties
	Greenwood (penalty scored); Luis Henrique (penalty missed); Balerdi (penalty scored); Rabiot (penalty scored); Rowe (penalty missed)		(penalty scored) Bakker; (penalty scored) Ismaily; (penalty scored) And. Gomes; (penalty scored) Alexsandro

15 January 2025	Bourgoin-Jallieu (5)	2–2 (4–2 p)	Lyon (1)	Bourgoin-Jallieu
18:00	Moujetzky 20', 69'	Report	Matić 45'; Mikautadze 64'	Stadium: Stade Pierre Rajon; Attendance: 6,359; Referee: Mikael Lesage
	Penalties
	Bozkurt (penalty scored); Norde (penalty scored); Mendy (penalty scored); Moujetzky (penalty missed); Atik (penalty scored)		(penalty missed) Lacazette; (penalty missed) Tolisso; (penalty scored) Niakhaté; (penalty scored) Nuamah

15 January 2025	Toulouse (1)	2–1	Laval (2)	Toulouse
18:30	Genreau 19'; Cresswell 24'	Report	Adiléhou 85'	Stadium: Stadium de Toulouse; Attendance: 17,921; Referee: Mathieu Vernice

15 January 2025	Quevilly-Rouen (3)	2–3	Angers (1)	Le Petit-Quevilly
18:30	Dali-Amar 28', 90+4' (pen.)	Report	Lepaul 2'; Dieng 6' (pen.); Allevinah 52'	Stadium: Stade Robert Diochon; Attendance: 3,771; Referee: Hakim Ben El Hadj

15 January 2025	Troyes (2)	1–0	Rennes (1)	Troyes
18:30	Saïd 56'	Report		Stadium: Stade de l'Aube; Attendance: 4,690; Referee: Romain Lissorgue

15 January 2025	Stade Briochin (4)	1–1 (4–3 p)	Annecy (2)	Saint-Brieuc
18:30	Konan 55' (pen.)	Report	Tiendrébéogo 9'	Stadium: Stade Fred-Aubert; Attendance: 4,565; Referee: Faouzi Benchabane

15 January 2025	Brest (1)	2–1	Nantes (1)	Brest
18:30	Sima 24'; Charonnet 34'	Report	Guirassy 83'	Stadium: Stade Francis-Le Blé; Attendance: 11,581; Referee: Abdelatif Kherradji

15 January 2025	Thaon (5)	2–2 (3–5 p)	Strasbourg (1)	Épinal
18:30	Villa 32'; Leroy 45+2'	Report	Messi 20', 26'	Stadium: Stade de la Colombière; Attendance: 3,153; Referee: Bastien Dechepy

15 January 2025	Cannes (4)	2–1	Lorient (2)	Cannes
18:30	Abbas 13', 21'	Report	Le Bris 36'	Stadium: Stade Pierre de Coubertin; Attendance: 4,521; Referee: Olivier Thual

15 January 2025	Espaly (5)	2–4	Paris Saint-Germain (1)	Clermont-Ferrand
21:00	Gjeçi 3'; Fournel 71'	Report	Zaïre-Emery 37'; Doué 67'; Barcola 88'; Ramos 90+2' (pen.)	Stadium: Stade Marcel-Michelin; Attendance: 12,939; Referee: Marc Bollengier

22 January 2025	Haguenau (4)	1–3	Dunkerque (2)	Haguenau
17:00	Metzger 38'	Report	Courtet 75'; Skyttä 83'; Bammou 90+7'	Stadium: Parc des Sports de Haguenau; Attendance: 1,753; Referee: Antoine Valnet

== Round of 16 ==
The draw was made on 16 January 2025. Ties took place between 4 and 6 February 2025.

4 February 2025	Lille (1)	1–1 (4–5 p)	Dunkerque (2)	Lille
19:00	And. Gomes 85'	Report	Tejan 90+6'	Stadium: Stade Pierre-Mauroy; Attendance: 33,715; Referee: Benoît Millot
	Penalties
	Mbappé (penalty scored); Bakker (penalty scored); And. Gomes (penalty scored); Alexsandro (penalty missed); Haraldsson (penalty missed); Akpom (penalty scored); André (penalty missed)		(penalty missed) Courtet; (penalty missed) Bardeli; (penalty scored) Sanganté; (penalty scored) Georgen; (penalty scored) Sekongo; (penalty scored) Senneville; (penalty scored) Jaouen

4 February 2025	Troyes (2)	1–2	Brest (1)	Troyes
19:00	Magnetti 55' (o.g.)	Report	Salah 49'; Sima 90+2'	Stadium: Stade de l'Aube; Attendance: 4,500; Referee: Jérémy Stinat

4 February 2025	Le Mans (3)	0–2	Paris Saint-Germain (1)	Le Mans
21:10		Report	Doué 25'; Barcola 71'	Stadium: Stade Marie-Marvingt; Attendance: 24,254; Referee: Abdelatif Kherradji

5 February 2025	Stade Briochin (4)	2–1	Nice (1)	Saint-Brieuc
20:45	Boudin 88', 90+7'	Report	Louchet 55'	Stadium: Stade Fred-Aubert; Attendance: 4,685; Referee: Hakim Ben El Hadj

5 February 2025	Toulouse (1)	0–2	Guingamp (2)	Toulouse
20:45		Report	Sidibé 52'; Ahile 89'	Stadium: Stadium de Toulouse; Attendance: 15,005; Referee: Marc Bollengier

5 February 2025	Cannes (4)	5–3	Dives-Cabourg (5)	Cannes
20:45	Domingues 9', 12'; Abbas 45+2'; Mambu 69'; Gonçalves 87'	Report	Thoris 25'; Fontaine 53'; Bekombo 90+4'	Stadium: Stade Pierre de Coubertin; Attendance: 6,194; Referee: Gaël Angoula

5 February 2025	Strasbourg (1)	1–3	Angers (1)	Strasbourg
20:45	Lemaréchal 13'	Report	Lepaul 2', 15'; El Melali 76'	Stadium: Stade de la Meinau; Attendance: 15,043; Referee: Eric Wattellier

6 February 2025	Bourgoin-Jallieu (5)	0–0 (2–3 p)	Reims (1)	Bourgoin-Jallieu
21:00		Report		Stadium: Stade Pierre Rajon; Attendance: 6,419; Referee: Olivier Thual
	Penalties
	Bozkurt (penalty scored); Mendy (penalty missed); Norde (penalty missed); Ben Amar (penalty missed); Atik (penalty scored)		(penalty missed) Diakité; (penalty scored) Buta; (penalty scored) Sangui; (penalty missed) Itō; (penalty scored) Akieme

== Quarter-finals ==
The draw was made on 6 February 2025. Ties took place on 25 and 26 February 2025.

25 February 2025	Angers (1)	1–1 (3–5 p)	Reims (1)	Angers
21:00	Dieng 90+5'	Report	Nakamura 79'	Stadium: Stade Raymond Kopa; Attendance: 13,000; Referee: Mathieu Vernice
	Penalties
	Dieng (penalty scored); Niane (penalty missed); Ferhat (penalty scored); Raolisoa (penalty scored)		(penalty scored) Nakamura; (penalty scored) Gabriel Moscardo; (penalty scored) Sangui; (penalty scored) Itō; (penalty scored) Diakité

25 February 2025	Cannes (4)	3–1	Guingamp (2)	Cannes
21:00	Abbas 23'; Gonçalves 30'; Domingues 69'	Report	Siwe 46'	Stadium: Stade Pierre de Coubertin; Attendance: 9,000; Referee: Romain Lissorgue

26 February 2025	Brest (1)	2–3	Dunkerque (2)	Brest
19:00	Pereira Lage 45'; Youssouf 59' (o.g.)	Report	Sasso 65'; Sanganté 80', 84'	Stadium: Stade Francis-Le Blé; Attendance: 14,806; Referee: Willy Delajod

26 February 2025	Stade Briochin (4)	0–7	Paris Saint-Germain (1)	Rennes
21:10		Report	Neves 16'; Ramos 36', 49' (pen.), 58'; Doué 55'; Mayulu 66'; Dembélé 85'	Stadium: Roazhon Park; Attendance: 25,915; Referee: Thomas Léonard

== Semi-finals ==
The draw was made on 27 February 2025. The ties took place on 1 and 2 April 2025. The draw featured fourth-division side Cannes, the lowest-ranked team remaining in the competition.

1 April 2025	Dunkerque (2)	2–4	Paris Saint-Germain (1)	Lille
21:10 CEST	Sasso 7'; Al-Saad 27'	Report	Dembélé 45', 90+3'; Marquinhos 48'; Doué 62'	Stadium: Stade Pierre-Mauroy; Attendance: 45,419; Referee: Jérôme Brisard

2 April 2025	Cannes (4)	1–2	Reims (1)	Cannes
21:00 CEST	Ndoye 52'	Report	Ibrahim 14'; Teuma 58'	Stadium: Stade Pierre de Coubertin; Attendance: 8,000; Referee: Eric Wattellier

== Final ==
24 May 2025
21:00 CEST

Paris Saint-Germain	3–0	Reims
Barcola 16', 19'; Hakimi 43'	Report

Stade de France, Saint-Denis
Attendance: 77,101
Referee: Benoît Bastien
