= 2026–27 Coupe de France =

Tournament details
- Country: France
- Dates: 2 May 2026 – 15 May 2027

The 2026–27 Coupe de France is the 110th season of the main football cup competition of France. The competition was organised by the French Football Federation (FFF) and is open to all clubs in French football, as well as clubs from the overseas departments and territories (Guadeloupe, French Guiana, Martinique, Mayotte, Tahiti, Réunion, Saint Martin, and Saint Pierre and Miquelon).

The defending champions are RC Lens, who defeated OGC Nice 3–1 in the previous year's final for their maiden Coupe de France title.

== Dates ==
Dates for the first and second rounds are set by regional leagues, while the FFF sets the calendar for all matches in subsequent rounds. From the third round to the round of 32, all matches take place on weekends. Afterwards, each match takes place on Wednesday evening.

All clubs from the amateur departmental leagues (tiers 9-15) enter at round 1, and all clubs from the amateur regional leagues enter in round 2 (tiers 5-7). This is not a hard rule, and exceptions are frequently made based on the number of clubs in a given district.

Stage	Round	Dates	Teams entering	Teams playing
Preliminary rounds
1	First round	Regional dates		
2	Second round	Regional dates		
Entry of N2 clubs (82), some R1 clubs (certain regions), and the regional champion from Saint Pierre and Miquelon
3	Third round	12–13 September 2026		2332
Entry of N1 clubs (47) and IC Croix (N2)
4	Fourth round	26–27 September 2026	48	1214
Entry of Ligue 3 clubs (18)
5	Fifth round	10–11 October 2026	18	620
6	Sixth round	24–25 October 2026	-	310
Entry of Ligue 2 clubs (18) and regional champions from Mayotte, New Caledonia, and Tahiti (3)
7	Seventh round	14–15 November 2026	21	176
Entry of regional champions from Guadeloupe, French Guiana, Réunion, and Martinique (4)
8	Eighth round	28–29 November 2026	4	92
Final rounds
Entry of Ligue 1 clubs (18)
9	Round of 64	19–20 December 2026	18	64
10	Round of 32	9–10 January 2027	-	32
11	Round of 16	3 February 2027	-	16
12	Quarterfinals	3 March 2027	-	8
13	Semifinals	21 April 2027	-	4
14	Final	15 May 2027	-	2

== Preliminary rounds ==
=== Round 7 ===
The qualified teams were divided into nine distinct groups of equal level and geography to avoid long travel. The 155 clubs that qualified from the sixth round are joined by all 18 clubs from Ligue 2, as well as the regional representatives from Mayotte, New Caledonia, and Tahiti.

By a wide margin, the lowest ranked remaining team in this round was AS Violaines, being the only club from France's amateur departmental level (D2, i.e. the tenth level) still in the tournament.

==== Overseas ties ====
31 October 2026	Club Franciscain (Martinique)	4–0	(Martinique) Aiglon du Lamentin FC	Le François, Martinique
19:00 AST	Priam 17', 28'; Jougon 55', 85'	Report		Stadium: Stade Complexe Sportif de Trianon; Referee: Manuel Mezen; Assistant referees: Samuel Nomer, Logan Priam

4 November 2026	SC Baie-Mahault (Guadeloupe)	0–1	(Guadeloupe) ASC Siroco Les Abymes	Baie-Mahault, Guadeloupe
20:00 AST		Report	Gaydu 58'	Stadium: Stade Fiesque Duchesne; Referee: Jordan Chaibriant; Assistant referees: Olivier Galantine, Antony Dillie

6 November 2026	Olympique de Cayenne (French Guiana)	1–3	(French Guiana) AS Étoile de Matoury	Cayenne, French Guiana
20:00 GFT	Soutou 51'	Report	Doekoe 3'; Haabo 26', 58'	Stadium: Stade Georges-Chaumet; Referee: Mamadou Sow; Assistant referees: Frédéric Santana-Pena, Joana Beneche

15 November 2026	Saint-Pauloise FC (Réunion)	1–2	(Réunion) La Tamponnaise	Saint-Paul, Réunion
14:45 RET	Randriambololona 63'	Report	Balzanet 69'; Loricourt 90'	Stadium: Stade Paul Julius Bénard; Referee: Bruno Fontaine; Assistant referees: Salim Maillot, Noah Fumonde

==== Overseas team hosting mainland team ====
14 November 2026	AS Tefana (French Polynesia)	0–4	US Thionville Lusitanos (3)	Faʼaʼā, Tahiti
18:00 TAHT			Tubio 18'; Gouletquer 30'; Montet 40'; Kalambayi 80'	Stadium: Stade Louis Ganivet; Referee: Ruddy Buquet; Assistant referees: Ariipaea Faatau, Nicolas Tuahine

==== Mainland ties ====
===== Group 7A =====
14 November 2026	FC Tinténiac Saint-Domineuc (6)	1–4	US Concarneau (3)	Rennes
17:00 CET	Quénet 89' (pen.)	Report	Varvat 36', 90', 90+2', 90+5'	Stadium: Stade Roger Salengro; Referee: Léo Beulet; Assistant referees: Idir Ait Said, Pierre Renaudeau

14 November 2026	AS Vitré (5)	1–2	Saint-Pierre de Milizac (5)	Vitré, Ille-et-Vilaine
18:00 CET	Pommereul 16'	Report	Lungituka 6'; Mourdi 77'	Stadium: Stade Municipal de Vitré; Referee: Kévin Barbin; Assistant referees: Antoine Boyard, Axel Dupays

14 November 2026	COBSP Saint-Brieuc (6)	0–0 (3–4 p)	FC Rouen (3)	Saint-Brieuc
18:00 CET		Report		Stadium: Stade Fred-Aubert; Referee: Hakim Mahaoudi; Assistant referees: Antoine Jean, Rémi Jeanneau
	Penalties
	Brocard (penalty scored) (penalty missed); Landois (penalty scored); Denes (penalty missed); Hamon (penalty scored)		(penalty missed) Bassin; (penalty scored) Samoura; (penalty scored) Pacius; (penalty scored) Tchokounté; (penalty scored) Sommer

14 November 2026	GSI Pontivy (4)	2–2 (2–4 p)	TA Rennes (5)	Pontivy
18:00 CET	Tirco 24'; Gomis 40'	Report	Caroff 42'; Daniel 90+1'	Stadium: Stade Municipal du Faubourg de Verdun; Referee: Paul Benito; Assistant referees: Clément Jablonski, François Guillard

14 November 2026	Lannion FC (5)	0–0 (4–3 p)	EA Guingamp (2)	Lannion
19:00 CET		Report		Stadium: Stade René Guillou; Referee: Tifenn LeProdhomme; Assistant referees: Gaëtan Damy, Jean-Paul Neves Gouveia

15 November 2026	EA Saint Renan (6)	1–2	Stade Lavallois (2)	Saint-Renan
14:00 CET	Remond 53'	Report	Gourichy 14'; Maggiotti 17'	Stadium: Stade Abbé Le Gall; Referee: Mikaël Lesage; Assistant referees: Yassine Nacirdine, Arnaud Merré

15 November 2026	Stade Pontivyen (6)	0–0 (8–7 p)	Stade Plabennécois (6)	Pontivy
14:00 CET		Report		Stadium: Stade du Faubourg de Verdun; Referee: Louis Flachot; Assistant referees: Julien Grellier, David Plainchamp

15 November 2026	US Perros Louannec (8)	0–7	Vannes OC (5)	Perros-Guirec
14:00 CET		Report	Lushima 34'; Le Bolloch 37'; Soufaché 43'; Kallouche 70', 89'; Bila 86'; Vallot 90'	Stadium: Stade Yves Le Jannou; Referee: Cédric Le Paih; Assistant referees: Elian Douart, Clément Repessé

===== Group 7B =====
14 November 2026	FC Vesoul (5)	2–2 (3–5 p)	FC Fleury 91 (3)	Vesoul
14:00 CET	Matrisciano 72'; El Mouttaqi 76' (pen.)	Report	Verdier 13'; Homssa 22'	Stadium: Stade René Hologne; Referee: Mickaël Leleu; Assistant referees: Gilles Lang-Kaercher, Olivier Wolfers

14 November 2026	CA Boulay (6)	2–2 (3–5 p)	FC Sochaux-Montbéliard (2)	Boulay-Moselle
14:30 CET	Hector 69'; Tavares 90' (o.g.)	Report	Baghdadi 49'; Demoncy 54' (pen.)	Stadium: Stade Charles Muller; Referee: Félicien Gazon; Assistant referees: Yann Thenard, Olivier Studer
	Penalties
	Penalty missed Penalty scored		(penalty scored) Djoco (penalty scored); (penalty scored) Monthieu; (penalty scored) Clairicia; (penalty scored) Gomis

14 November 2026	ASL Koetzingue (6)	1–3	ASC Biesheim (4)	Kœtzingue
17:30 CET	Junker 90'	Report	Ramos 25'; Kadi 64'; Reppert 75'	Stadium: Stade de La Croix; Referee: Anthony Ustaritz; Assistant referees: Bérengère Jourdain, Adrien Bourdon

14 November 2026	CSO Amnéville (6)	0–1	AS Sundhoffen (6)	Amnéville
18:00 CET		Report	Tubio 16'	Stadium: Stade André Valentin; Referee: Valentin Ougier; Assistant referees: Jérémi Vanier, Alexandre Salmon

14 November 2026	FCO Strasbourg Koenigshoffen 06 (6)	1–2	US Oberlauterbach (7)	Strasbourg
18:00 CET	Mouakit 90+6'	Report	Zacher 2'; Patou 71'	Stadium: Stade Charles Frey; Referee: Amaury Janvier; Assistant referees: Julien Cotinaut, Frédéric Kontzler

14 November 2026	Racing Besançon (5)	4–1	APM Metz FC (5)	Besançon
18:00 CET	Fenollar 23'; Cissokho 37'; Hoggas 61'; Chaillet 70'	Report	Jager 54'	Stadium: Stade Léo Lagrange; Referee: Brice Bayour; Assistant referees: Valentin Kihn, Sabri Ghedhab-Remblière

15 November 2026	AS Montigny-lès-Metz (8)	0–5	CA Pontarlier (5)	Metz
14:00 CET		Report	Renaudin 4'; Deniaud 23'; Camara 23'; Vegran 77', 88'	Stadium: Stade Émile Weinberg; Referee: Christophe Tani; Assistant referees: Aurélien Wittmann, Thibault Forestier

15 November 2026	AS Talange (7)	2–0	AS Baume-les-Dames (7)	Talange
14:00 CET	Ouadah 70'; Terzic 90'	Report		Stadium: Stade Maurice Baquet; Referee: Alexis Guillon; Assistant referees: Florian Carré, Alexandre Rubino

banana

15 November 2026	ESAP Metz Borny (8)	0–1	US Reipertswiller (6)	Metz
14:00 CET		Report	Bourgatte 50'	Stadium: Stade Haut de Blémont; Referee: Timothé Bonnot; Assistant referees: Omer Yuksel, Killian Selloum

15 November 2026	SR Saint-Dié Kellermann (6)	1–0	FC Metz (2)	Saint-Dié-des-Vosges
14:00 CET	Koné 84'	Report		Stadium: Stade Émile Jeanpierre; Referee: Pierre Gaillouste; Assistant referees: Laurent Coniglio, Guillaume Lambert-Coucot

===== Group 7C =====
13 November 2026	FCF La Neuvillette-Jamin (6)	2–2 (0–3 p)	Valenciennes FC (3)	Reims
20:00 CET	Tchuameni 63'; Foemi 89'	Report	Ndiaye 47', 59'	Stadium: Stade Louis Blériot; Referee: Florian Della Tomasina; Assistant referees: Yohann Tible, Gaspard Barachin

14 November 2026	US Tourcoing (6)	0–1	Stade de Reims (2)	Tourcoing
14:00 CET		Report	Célestin 90+1'	Stadium: Stade Charles Van de Veegaete; Referee: Thierry Bouille; Assistant referees: Christopher Spadafora, Florent Marmion

14 November 2026	IC Croix (5)	1–2	ES Thaon (5)	Croix, Nord
17:00 CET	Robert 67'	Report	Rother 40'; Barbason 69'	Stadium: Stade Henri Seigneur; Referee: Guillaume Danglade; Assistant referees: Bilel Benssalah, Mourad Bouallak

14 November 2026	Stade Béthunois FC (6)	3–3 (3–4 p)	AS Nancy Lorraine (2)	Béthune
18:00 CET	Guinot 45+2'; Janeszko 58'; Hauet 63'	Report	Bouaoune 35'; Saint-Ruf 45+1'; Schnepp 47' (pen.)	Stadium: Stade Hermant-Deprez; Referee: Rémi Landry; Assistant referees: Cédric Favre, Iléas Daoudi

14 November 2026	US Chauny (8)	0–2	US Le Pays du Valois (4)	Chauny
19:00 CET		Report	Sankoh 18'; Sidibé 51'	Stadium: Stade Joncourt; Referee: Audrey Gerbel; Assistant referees: Nathan Olejniczak, Luka Merlen

14 November 2026	OM Cambrai Amérique (8)	0–3	Amiens SC (3)	Cambrai
20:00 CET		Report	Ramla 8'; Somon 22'; Rafii 90+1'	Stadium: Stade de la Liberté; Referee: Edgar Barenton; Assistant referees: Brice Picard, Maxime Messier

15 November 2026	AS du Pays Neslois (8)	1–4	AS Furiani-Agliani (4)	Nesle
14:00 CET	Bourleux 73'	Report	Da Silva 54'; Vincent 60'; Paul 76'; Bertil 90+5'	Stadium: Stade Éloi Auffève; Referee: Octave Dhellemmes; Assistant referees: Maxime Crestani, Clément Fediaczko

15 November 2026	AS Violaines (10)	0–1	US Vermelles (8)	Wingles
14:00 CET		Report	Detoeuf 34'	Stadium: Stade Léonard Danel; Referee: Valentin Cardon; Assistant referees: Corentin Neft, Nicolas Hubeau

15 November 2026	Olympique Charleville Prix AM (5)	2–0	Olympique Marcquois Football (6)	Charleville-Mézières
14:00 CET	Mandangui 30'; Kyei 88'	Report		Stadium: Stade du Petit Bois; Referee: Théo Benoît; Assistant referees: Gabriel Chiaffitella, Mehdi Tanine
Note: Stopped 88th minute due to home supporters invading the pitch, final ruling from FFF pending, deciding in favor of the home team on November 19.

15 November 2026	US Vandœuvre (7)	0–3	SAS Épinal (4)	Vandœuvre-lès-Nancy
14:00 CET		Report	Bouresas 35'; Correa 73'; Glaentzlin 86'	Stadium: Stade Jacques Sonnet; Referee: Alexis Gil; Assistant referees: Sebastian Henry, Alexandre Vallez

===== Group 7D =====
14 November 2026	US Choisy-au-Bac (7)	0–2	SM Caen (3)	Compiègne
16:00 CET		Report	Kanouté 18'; Daffot 66'	Stadium: Stade Paul-Cosyns; Referee: Dorian Bovolenta; Assistant referees: Guillaume Bigot, Guillaume Régnier

14 November 2026	AS Saint-Ouen-l'Aumône (5)	1–0	US Boulogne (2)	Saint-Ouen-l'Aumône
18:00 CET	Jacqueray 25'	Report		Stadium: Parc des sports de Saint-Ouen-l'Aumône; Referee: Soulaimane Chamel; Assistant referees: Sébastien Lemaire, Hugo-Rémi de Graaf

14 November 2026	ASPTT Caen (5)	2–3	FC Chambly Oise (4)	Caen
18:00 CET	Masrour 58'; Gervais 80'	Report	Amiche 45'; Gannoun 47'; Khasa 76'	Stadium: Stade Maurice Fouque; Referee: Tom Robert; Assistant referees: Romain Bénéteau, Simon Cochais

14 November 2026	Le Touquet AC (6)	2–3	US Avranches (4)	Le Touquet
18:00 CET	Legal 32'; Keïta 75'	Report	Pi 52' (pen.); Herbin 55', 63' (pen.)	Stadium: Stade Gérard Houllier; Referee: Henri Dutech-Perez; Assistant referees: Romain Filipe Fernandes, Philippe Da Costa

14 November 2026	US Saint-Omer (6)	2–2 (5–4 p)	AF Virois (5)	Saint-Omer, Pas-de-Calais
18:00 CET	Hairion 61'; Telliez 71'	Report	Kowalczyk 19'; Aumond 36'	Stadium: Stade Gaston Bonnet; Referee: Clément Visbecq; Assistant referees: Julien Thiel, Thomas Mercou

14 November 2026	USL Dunkerque (2)	0–3	US Quevilly (3)	Dunkirk
18:00 CET		Report	Seck 10'; Capuano 72'; Jean-Marie 78'	Stadium: Stade Marcel-Tribut; Referee: Gabriel Henry; Assistant referees: Youssef El Hamzaoui, Thomas Canonnet

15 November 2026	AS Verson (8)	1–5	RC Calais (6)	Mondeville, Calvados
14:00 CET	Voisin 49'	Report	Bruneel 2'; Baala 37'; Varane 43'; Wojtkowiak 71'; Maison 81'	Stadium: Stade Michel Farré; Referee: Paul Garo; Assistant referees: Maëlig Jouanno, Antoine Perchoc

15 November 2026	FC Saint-Martin-lèz-Tatinghem (8)	1–2	Racing Club de France (4)	Saint-Martin-lez-Tatinghem
14:00 CET	Niane 12'	Report	Fares 64'; Ibrahimi 89'	Stadium: Stade Saint-Martin-au-Laërt; Referee: Noa Fonteneau; Assistant referees: Hichem Massaoudi-Briere, Aziz Ahansal

15 November 2026	US Montreuil-sur-Mer (7)	0–3	FC Loon-Plage (6)	Écuires
14:00 CET		Report	Sané 42', 90'; Evrard 70'	Stadium: Stade du Cosec; Referee: Jean-Baptiste Esponde; Assistant referees: Nicolas Philippe, Raphaël Larsonneur

15 November 2026	Stade Sottevillais CC (6)	0–0 (4–1 p)	USF Fécamp (7)	Sotteville-lès-Rouen
14:30 CET		Report		Stadium: Stade Jean Adret; Referee: Gaëtan Deneuve; Assistant referees: Quentin Delhomme, Nicolas Anne

===== Group 7E =====
13 November 2026	Dijon FCO (2)	1–2	US Orléans (3)	Dijon
20:00 CET	Barka 63'	Report	Ribeiro 33'; Legendre 40' (pen.)	Stadium: Stade Gaston Gérard; Referee: Faouzi Benchabane; Assistant referees: Julien Reynet, Brice Brossette

14 November 2026	AS Contres (7)	0–4	ESA Linas-Montlhéry (5)	Contres, Loir-et-Cher
18:00 CET		Report	Cissé 30', 70', 90'; Doucouré 36'	Stadium: Stade Henri Chartier; Referee: Lakhdar El Bedoui; Assistant referees: Elvedin Calakovic, Anthony Fonlupt

14 November 2026	ASPTT Dijon (5)	0–2	Is-Selongey Football (5)	Dijon
18:00 CET		Report	Mary 62'; Hammi 90+4'	Stadium: L'Astragale Terrain 1998; Referee: Martin Desroches; Assistant referees: Alexis Bergeron, Sébastien Decitre

15 November 2026	Chatou AS (6)	0–0 (4–5 p)	CO Les Ulis (6)	Chatou
14:00 CET		Report		Stadium: Stade Charles Finaltéri; Referee: Insa Inssa; Assistant referees: Antoine Verecque, Lukas Puzilewicz

15 November 2026	CS Sedan Ardennes (6)	2–0	Bourges Foot 18 (4)	Sedan, Ardennes
14:00 CET	Masson 71'; Gueye 89'	Report		Stadium: Stade Louis Dugauguez; Referee: Siham Benmahammed; Assistant referees: Valentin Théry Simonin, Morgann Delhaye

15 November 2026	Paris 13 Atletico (3)	0–2	Red Star FC (2)	XIII^{e} arr., Paris
14:00 CET		Report	Ikanga 11'; Danger 34'	Stadium: Stade Sébastien Charléty; Referee: Azzedine Souifi; Assistant referees: Mikaël Berchebru, Jules Belcadi

15 November 2026	SC Massay (8)	2–2 (5–4 p)	FC Montlouis (4)	Vierzon
14:00 CET	Louet 38', 90+5' (pen.)	Report	Barbier 14'; Fofana 36'	Stadium: Stade de Brouhot; Referee: Mathis Fauchon; Assistant referees: Aaron Madoré, Eliott Bunel
	Penalties
	Morand (penalty scored); Louet (penalty scored); Atil (penalty scored); Mouillet (penalty missed); Bernier (penalty scored); Braga (penalty scored)		(penalty scored) Faiz; (penalty scored) Rizaldos; (penalty scored) Cachenaut; (penalty missed) Diakhaby; (penalty scored) Valbon; (penalty missed) Fofana

15 November 2026	Tremblay FC (7)	2–0	Maisons Alfort FC (4)	Tremblay-en-France
14:00 CET	El Asri 52'; Cissé 80'	Report		Stadium: Parc des Sports Georges Prudhomme; Referee: Alexandra Collin; Assistant referees: Hedi Arfaoui, Fabrice Simard

15 November 2026	USM Senlis (7)	0–2	Saint-Pryvé Saint-Hilaire FC (4)	Senlis
14:00 CET		Report	Ukaj 45'; Antoine 80'	Stadium: Stade Municipal de Senlis; Referee: Louison Olivier; Assistant referees: Hamza Belbachir, Julien Mamet

15 November 2026	Val Yerres Crosne AF (7)	2–2 (3–4 p)	Cosne UCS (6)	Créteil
14:00 CET	Miladi 39'; Besnier 90+4'	Report	Brossard 11'; Fiogbé 88'	Stadium: Parc des Sports Inter. Honneur; Referee: Louis Lungeri; Assistant referees: Djamal Makhlouf, Mathieu Mustar

===== Group 7F =====
12 November 2026	Chambéry SF (6)	0–2	Grenoble Foot 38 (2)	Chambéry
19:00 CET		Report	Djitté 77'; Magnin 90+5'	Stadium: Chambéry Savoie Stadium; Referee: Karim Abed; Assistant referees: Grégoire Valleteau de Moulliac, Amine Bahi

14 November 2026	FC Balagne (5)	0–5	Montpellier HSC (2)	Monticello, Haute-Corse
14:00 CET		Report	Diarra 2', 54'; Hatchi 73'; Mukiele 75', 86'	Stadium: Stade Jacques Ambroggi; Referee: Ahmed Taleb; Assistant referees: Gaétan Korbas, Loris Leporati

14 November 2026	Le Puy-en-Velay FC (3)	4–0	(Mayotte) Diables Noirs de Combani	Le Puy-en-Velay
14:00 CET	Dembélé 26'; Nsingi 67'; Ducourtioux 81'; Ghalem 89'	Report		Stadium: Stade Charles Massot; Referee: Jean-Guillaume Dasque; Assistant referees: Victor Pétigny, Maxime Bersan

14 November 2026	Rhône Crussol Foot 07 (7)	0–3	ÉFC Fréjus Saint-Raphaël (4)	Guilherand-Granges
15:00 CET		Report	Jaby 24'; Konté 64'; Kissy 86'	Stadium: Stade Mistral; Referee: Aymeric Gaches; Assistant referees: Corentin Paya, Nolhan Zermane

14 November 2026	ES Grau-du-Roi (6)	2–4	Riviera FC (5)	Le Grau-du-Roi
18:00 CET	Laffaille 24'; Vigneron 36'	Report	Nsengo 14'; Backoula N. 37', 59'; Baglieri 89'	Stadium: Stade Michel Mézy; Referee: TBA; Assistant referees: Enzo Moré, Thomas Lévêque

14 November 2026	AF Lozère (7)	1–0	Entente Crest-Aouste (6)	Mende, Lozère
19:00 CET	Diémé Ndour 18'	Report		Stadium: Stade Jean Jacques Delmas; Referee: Guillaume Janin; Assistant referees: Lyes Hadji Kerba, Andy Goncalves

14 November 2026	FC Claira/St Laurent (7)	2–2 (3–4 p)	AS Puissalicon-Magalas (8)	Canet-en-Roussillon
19:00 CET	Aïd 3' (pen.); Lopez 45'	Report	Fissoune 10'; Ramon 49'	Stadium: Stade Saint-Michel; Referee: Yassir Touil; Assistant referees: Romain Gervais, Walid Tlemcani

15 November 2026	AC Seyssinet (6)	0–2	Nîmes Olympique (4)	Seyssinet-Pariset
14:00 CET		Report	Diallo 30'; Diarra 40'	Stadium: Stade Joseph Guétat; Referee: Florian Taulier; Assistant referees: Ruben Puyalt, Benjamin Amsili

15 November 2026	USM Endoume Catalans (6)	2–1	SC Toulon (4)	Marseille
14:00 CET	Hadji 46'; Mangoni 85'	Report	Payet 33'	Stadium: Stade la Martine; Referee: Bilel Merzoug; Assistant referees: Malik El Meddah, Quentin Barrier

15 November 2026	AS Atlas Paillade (5)	0–2	AS Cannes (3)	Montpellier
15:00 CET		Report	Morante 71'; Gerbeaud 90+5'	Stadium: Stade de la Mosson; Referee: Eddy Rosier; Assistant referees: Régis Gaillard, Matthieu Bonnetin

===== Group 7G =====
14 November 2026	FC Versailles 78 (3)	3–2	Rodez AF (2)	Saint-Germain-en-Laye
14:00 CET	Rocha 4'; Cissé 72'; Zakharyan 90+1'	Report	Mendes 36'; Khouma 44' (o.g.)	Stadium: Stade Georges Lefèvre; Referee: Benoît Millot; Assistant referees: Valentin Evrard, Lucas Beckendorf

14 November 2026	SAG Cestas (5)	0–1	Aviron Bayonnais FC (4)	Cestas
18:00 CET		Report	Traoré	Stadium: Complexe Sportif du Bouzet; Referee: Romain Zamo; Assistant referees: Romain Galibert, Julien Roblez

14 November 2026	Balma SC (6)	1–1 (0–3 p)	US Castanéenne (5)	Balma
18:30 CET	Alexandre 90+4'	Report	Tait 24'	Stadium: Stade Nicolas Campailla; Referee: Lucas Fouret; Assistant referees: Hugo Garcia, Maxens Froger

14 November 2026	ESA Brive (6)	0–3	Angoulême Charente FC (4)	Brive-la-Gaillarde
19:00 CET		Report	Montavit 18'; Makan 85'; Bouazza 88'	Stadium: Stade André Pestourie; Referee: Tawbane Kani; Assistant referees: Thibau Castex, Maxence Saunier

14 November 2026	FC Lourdais XI (6)	0–4	Pau FC (2)	Tarbes
19:00 CET		Report	Brahimi 37'; Leye 62', 82'; Gasnier 90'	Stadium: Stade Maurice Trélut; Referee: Abdelatif Kherradji; Assistant referees: Ludovic Reyes, Nicolas Rodrigues

14 November 2026	ES Boulazac (6)	3–3 (1–3 p)	Les Genêts d'Anglet (5)	Boulazac
19:00 CET	Koutar 40' (pen.); Dessolas 56'; Tirera 73'	Report	Estève 43'; Taounti 52'; Poirier 76'	Stadium: Stade Lucien Dutard; Referee: Pierre Legat; Assistant referees: Jean-Baptiste Jeannot, Tanguy Floze

14 November 2026	Stade Bordelais (6)	1–1 (5–4 p)	AS Mazères Uzos Rontignon (6)	Le Bouscat
19:00 CET	Baskar 40'	Report	Carrazé 88'	Stadium: Stade Sainte-Germaine; Referee: Hassan Taouil; Assistant referees: Valentin Rougier, Jordan Riché

15 November 2026	FC 2 Rives 82 (6)	2–1	Trélissac-Antonne Périgord FC (5)	Golfech
14:00 CET	Laincer 87'; Legardeur 90'	Report	B. Jaba 20'	Stadium: Stade Paul Lafont; Referee: Gaëtan Martin; Assistant referees: Enzo Bec, Romain Canal

15 November 2026	RC Chambéry (7)	2–2 (4–3 p)	Chamois Niortais Saint-Florent (7)	Villenave-d'Ornon
14:00 CET	Marcel 15'; Letuve 65' (pen.)	Report	Gagneur 10'; Mayi 45'	Stadium: Stade Pierre Brossolette; Referee: Robin Hingrand; Assistant referees: Jordan Morisson, Youssef El Khelouane

15 November 2026	Rochefort FC (7)	2–2 (5–3 p)	Juventus de Papus (7)	Périgny, Charente-Maritime
14:00 CET	Roger 37', 87'	Report	Belahouel 10'; Da Costa 42'	Stadium: Stade Municipal de Périgny; Referee: Maika Vanderstichel

===== Group 7H =====
13 November 2026	US Philibertine Football (5)	1–3	VFC La Roche-sur-Yon (3)	Saint-Philbert-de-Grand-Lieu
20:00 CET	Cuvier 85'	Report	Samb 34', 42'; Araujo 70'	Stadium: Complexe Sportif des Chevrets; Referee: Valentin Giorgetti; Assistant referees: Romain Hennache, Fabien Darcel

14 November 2026	Vendée Fontenay Foot (5)	0–5	Clermont Foot 63 (2)	Fontenay-le-Comte
16:00 CET		Report	Cantero 8', 12'; Bianchini 34'; Bouchenna 55', 67'	Stadium: Stade Emmanuel Murzeau; Referee: Jordane Lomi; Assistant referees: Élodie Coppola, Alexandre Ayache

14 November 2026	Saint Sébastien FC (6)	0–2	US La Baule-Le Pouliguen (6)	Saint-Sébastien-sur-Loire
17:00 CET		Report	Gomes 5'; Mendy 19'	Stadium: Stade René Massé; Referee: Simon Préaux; Assistant referees: Ewen Berder, Fabien Pichon

14 November 2026	Vendée Poiré Football (4)	2–1	USSA Vertou (5)	Le Poiré-sur-Vie
17:00 CET	Mayela 7'; Lourdin 80'	Report	Héguiabéhéré 44'	Stadium: Stade de l'Idonnière; Referee: Alexandre Frappreau; Assistant referees: Samy Hiri, Fridolin Gilles

14 November 2026	Voltigeurs de Châteaubriant (4)	5–0	(New Caledonia) AS Horizon Patho	Châteaubriant
18:00 CET	Luzayadio 8'; Bentil 40'; Chambon 54', 60', 80'			Stadium: Stade de la Ville en Bois; Referee: Clément Jablonski; Assistant referees: Damien Vallet, Thomas Camontes

14 November 2026	CPB Bréquigny Football (6)	0–1	Montluçon Football (6)	Rennes
19:00 CET		Report	Dossou-Gbété 90+3'	Stadium: Complexe sportif de Bréquigny; Referee: Mathieu Delaloy; Assistant referees: Benjamin Guelfucci, Emin Muzaffarzada

14 November 2026	ES Buxerolles (6)	0–7	Sablé FC (5)	Buxerolles, Vienne
19:00 CET		Report	Monnier 20', 28'; Souazara 42'; Bouhoutt 55'; Ngampika 57'; Kadidi 84', 89'	Stadium: Stade Michel-Amand; Referee: Axel Lainé; Assistant referees: Benoist Hachette, Maxime Aubard

14 November 2026	FC Andréa Macairois (7)	0–2	FC Nueillaubiers (6)	Cholet
19:00 CET		Report	Godet 30'; Soro 61'	Stadium: Stade Omnisports Jean Bouin; Referee: Quentin Fourel; Assistant referees: Florent Urvoy, Nathan Le Guillou

14 November 2026	FC Bressuire (6)	3–1	FC Challans (5)	Bressuire
19:00 CET	Bonneau 5'; Dabin 50'; Rambaud 90+2'	Report	Niaoré 83'	Stadium: Stade Alain Métayer; Referee: Gaël Gratianne; Assistant referees: Julien Laverdan, [TBD]

15 November 2026	Stade Castelbourgeois (6)	1–9	FC Nantes (2)	Vitré, Ille-et-Vilaine
14:00 CET	Tchanturia 48' (pen.)	Report	Younoussa 25', 73'; Leroux 27'; Hamel 30' (o.g.); Joujou 39', 44'; Corredor 46'; Hachem 71'; Ganago 79'	Stadium: Stade Municipal de Vitré; Referee: Pierre Retail; Assistant referees: Charlie Sorel, Aurélien Grizon

===== Group 7I =====
14 November 2026	FC Chalon (5)	0–3	Hauts Lyonnais (4)	Chalon-sur-Saône
16:00 CET		Report	Messili 43'; El Hassani 77'; Blot 90'	Stadium: Stade Léo-Lagrange (Chalon-sur-Saône); Referee: Baptiste Lambert; Assistant referees: Lucas Baudon, Dany Reault

14 November 2026	FCO Firminy Insersport (6)	1–1 (3–5 p)	FC Annecy (2)	Firminy
17:00 CET	Ngaidama 70'	Report	Yahi 79'	Stadium: Stade Le Corbusier; Referee: Gaël Angoula; Assistant referees: Julien Garrigues, Wajdi Chaari

14 November 2026	SO Pont-de-Chéruy (7)	1–5	FC Bourg-Péronnas (3)	Pont-de-Chéruy
17:00 CET	Chaïb 81'	Report	Gomes 2'; Ehling 3', 47', 90'; El Wakil 79'	Stadium: Complexe Sportif Grammont et Desvignes; Referee: Robin Chapapria; Assistant referees: Hamza Amhaouch, Julien Obert

14 November 2026	FC Cournon-d'Auvergne (7)	2–2 (1–4 p)	Chassieu Décines FC (6)	Cournon-d'Auvergne
18:00 CET	Parro 25'; Gouttefangeas 47'	Report	Pageaut 39'; Soumah 43'	Stadium: Stade Joseph et Michel Gardet; Referee: Simon Amzallag; Assistant referees: Oualid Krid, Guillaume Henck

14 November 2026	Lyon-La Duchère (4)	1–4	US Feurs (5)	Lyon
18:00 CET	Manga Tabi 75'	Report	Guechi 20'; Abbou 36'; Benseddik 45'; Hamdi 83'	Stadium: Stade de Balmont; Referee: Arnaud Baert; Assistant referees: Yanis Benkada, Marius Blaise

14 November 2026	USC Paray-Foot (7)	0–3	FC Villefranche Beaujolais (3)	Paray-le-Monial
18:00 CET		Report	Diakité 8'; Louzif 32'; Bakari 90+4'	Stadium: Stade des Sables; Referee: Florent Batta; Assistant referees: Victor Sousa, Alexandre Chéron

15 November 2026	ES de Veauche (8)	1–3	FC Saint Paul en Jarez (8)	Veauche
14:00 CET	Minaire 33'	Report	Zerguine 11'; Geraci 40', 49'	Stadium: Stade Irénée Laurent; Referee: Romain Perpiñan; Assistant referees: Allan Mongorin, Pedro Valente Lopes

15 November 2026	FC Riomois (7)	0–4	FC Limonest Dardilly Saint-Didier (4)	Riom
14:00 CET		Report	Roselli 6'; Bennekrouf 21'; Benhmida 59'; Braillon 90+3'	Stadium: Stade du Cerey; Referee: Julien Rouquette; Assistant referees: Armand Lafage, Julien Minisini

15 November 2026	GFA Rumilly-Vallières (4)	1–2	AS Saint-Étienne (2)	Annecy
15:00 CET	Kasia 58' (o.g.)	Report	Old 68'; Ferreira 71'	Stadium: Parc des Sports d'Annecy; Referee: Aurélien Petit; Assistant referees: Vianney Rozand, Gwenaël Pasqualotti

=== Round 8 ===
The 88 winners from the seventh round advanced to the eighth round, joined by the regional representatives of French Guiana, Réunion, Guadeloupe, and Martinique.

The lowest ranked remaining teams are Vermelles US, SC Massay, AS Puissalicon-Magalas, and FC Saint Paul en Jarez, all of the eighth tier (Régional 3).

==== Overseas team hosting mainland team ====
28 November 2026	AS Étoile de Matoury (French Guiana)	v	FC Fleury 91 (3)	Remire-Montjoly, French Guiana
15:30 GFT		Report		Stadium: Stade Municipal Dr. Edmard Lama

29 November 2026	La Tamponnaise (Réunion)	v	Angoulême Charente FC (4)	Saint-Pierre, Réunion
15:45 RET		Report		Stadium: Stade Michel Volnay

==== Mainland ties ====
===== Group 8A =====
28 November 2026	Vannes OC (5)	v	US Concarneau (3)	Theix-Noyalo
13:30 CET		Report		Stadium: Complexe Sportif du Pérenno

28 November 2026	Saint-Pierre de Milizac (5)	v	Stade Pontivyen (6)	Milizac-Guipronvel
18:00 CET		Report		Stadium: Stade Pen Ar Guéar

28 November 2026	Lannion FC (5)	v	Stade Lavallois (2)	Lannion
19:00 CET		Report		Stadium: Stade René Guillou

28 November 2026	TA Rennes (5)	v	FC Rouen (3)	Rennes
19:00 CET		Report		Stadium: Stade Roger Salengro

===== Group 8B =====
28 November 2026	CA Pontarlier (5)	v	(Guadeloupe) ASC Siroco Les Abymes	Pontarlier
15:00 CET		Report		Stadium: Stade Paul Robbe

28 November 2026	ASC Biesheim (4)	v	Racing Besançon (5)	Biesheim
17:00 CET		Report		Stadium: Stade Municipal de Biesheim

28 November 2026	US Reipertswiller (6)	v	AS Sundhoffen (6)	Reipertswiller
17:00 CET		Report		Stadium: Stade Éric Riffel

29 November 2026	AS Talange (7)	v	US Oberlauterbach (7)	Talange
13:30 CET		Report		Stadium: Stade Maurice Baquet

29 November 2026	SR Saint-Dié Kellermann (6)	v	FC Sochaux-Montbéliard (2)	Saint-Dié-des-Vosges
14:00 CET		Report		Stadium: Stade Émile Jeanpierre

===== Group 8C =====
27 November 2026	US Le Pays du Valois (4)	v	Valenciennes FC (3)	Le Plessis-Belleville
20:00 CET		Report		Stadium: Stade Municipal Olivier Lovighi

28 November 2026	Olympique Charleville Prix AM (5)	v	Stade de Reims (2)	Charleville-Mézières
13:30 CET				Stadium: Stade du Petit Bois

28 November 2026	SAS Épinal (4)	v	Amiens SC (3)	Épinal
15:00 CET		Report		Stadium: Stade de la Colombière

28 November 2026	AS Furiani-Agliani (4)	v	AS Nancy Lorraine (2)	Bastia
19:00 CET		Report		Stadium: Stade Dominique Ventimila

28 November 2026	US Vermelles (8)	v	ES Thaon (5)	Avion, Pas-de-Calais
18:00 CET		Report		Stadium: Stade François-Blin

===== Group 8D =====
27 November 2026	US Saint-Omer (6)	v	SM Caen (3)	Saint-Omer
20:00 CET		Report		Stadium: Stade Gaston Bonnet

28 November 2026	Stade Sottevillais CC (6)	v	US Quevilly (3)	Sotteville-lès-Rouen
13:30 CET		Report		Stadium: Stade Jean Adret

28 November 2026	FC Loon-Plage (6)	v	Racing Club de France (4)	Loon-Plage
17:00 CET		Report		Stadium: Stade Marcel Rosseel

28 November 2026	AS Saint-Ouen-l'Aumône (5)	v	RC Calais (6)	Saint-Ouen-l'Aumône
18:00 CET		Report		Stadium: Parc des sports de Saint-Ouen-l'Aumône

28 November 2026	FC Chambly Oise (4)	v	US Avranches (4)	Chambly, Oise
18:00 CET		Report		Stadium: Stade Walter-Luzi

===== Group 8E =====
28 November 2026	Tremblay FC (7)	v	Red Star FC (2)
13:30 CET		Report

28 November 2026	Cosne UCS (6)	v	CS Sedan Ardennes (6)	Cosne-Cours-sur-Loire
17:00 CET		Report		Stadium: Stade Raphaël Giraux

28 November 2026	Saint-Pryvé Saint-Hilaire FC (4)	v	Is-Selongey Football (5)	Saint-Pryvé-Saint-Mesmin
18:00 CET		Report		Stadium: Stade du Grand Clos

28 November 2026	SC Massay (8)	v	US Orléans (3)	Vierzon
19:00 CET		Report		Stadium: Stade de Brouhot

29 November 2026	CO Les Ulis (6)	v	ESA Linas-Montlhéry (5)	Les Ulis
13:30 CET		Report		Stadium: Stade Jean-Marc Salinier
