= 2026–27 Paris FC season =

Paris FC 2026–27 football season

Paris FC
2026–27 season
- President: Pierre Ferracci (until 9 November); Antoine Arnault (from 9 November)
- Deputy President: Jean-Marc Gallot
- Manager: Antoine Kombouaré (until 1 July); Liam Rosenior (from 2 July)
- Stadium: Stade Jean-Bouin
- Ligue 1: 3rd
- Coupe de France: TBD
colours	Away colours	Third colours

The 2026–27 season is the 58th season in the history of the Paris FC. It marks the club's second consecutive season in Ligue 1, finishing in 11th place the previous season on 44 points. In addition to the domestic league, the team will participate in the Coupe de France.

This season marks considerable changes in the club's management heirarchy, with manager Antoine Kombouaré being replaced with ex-Chelsea manager Liam Rosenior on 1 July. Longtime President Pierre Ferracci also officially turned his duties over to Antoine Arnault as of 9 November.

== Transfers ==
=== In ===
Pos.	Player	Transferred from	Fee	Date	Source
MF	(Georgia (country)) Andria Kvirikadze	(Georgia (country)) Dinamo Tbilisi	Undisclosed	1 July 2026	
LB	(France) Emmanuel Mbemba	(France) Paris Saint-Germain	Undisclosed	14 July 2026	
FW	(France) Pablo Pagis	(France) Lorient	€15m + €1.5m Bonus Incentives	15 July 2026	
CB	(Italy) Diego Coppola	(England) Brighton & Hove Albion	€16m + €4m Bonus Incentives	16 July 2026	
FW	(Mali) Lassine Sinayoko	(France) Auxerre	€8m	20 July 2026	
W	(Italy) Luca Koleosho	(England) Burnley	€10m-€15m (incl. bonuses)	29 July 2026	

=== Out ===
Pos.	Player	Transferred to	Fee	Date	Source
LW	(France) Julien López	(France) Cannes	Free	19 June 2026	
MF	(France) Lohann Doucet	(Portugal) Vitória	Free	14 July 2026	
RW	(France) Mathieu Cafaro	(France) Nantes	Undisclosed	16 July 2026	
LW	(France) Alimami Gory	(Saudi Arabia) Abha Club	Undisclosed	26 July 2026	
DF	(Morocco) Mathys Tourraine	(France) Pau	Undisclosed	30 July 2026	
FW	(France) Willem Geubbels	(Italy) Lecce	€5M + Bonuses	1 August 2026	
ST	(Italy) Ciro Immobile	Retired	N/A	14 August 2026	
DF	(Morocco) Mathys Tourraine	(France) Pau	Undisclosed	30 July 2026	
LB	(Finland) Tuomas Ollila	(France) Guingamp	Undisclosed	27 August 2026	
MF	(Madagascar) El Hadary Raheriniaina	(France) Nancy	Loan	27 August 2026	

== Friendlies ==
=== Pre-season ===
Source: Soccerway

18 July 2026 Friendly	Paris FC	1−0	Reims	Orly
16:00 CEST (UTC+2)	Pagis 50'	Report		Stadium: Groupe ADP - Centre D'Entraînement Paris FC

24 July 2026 Friendly	Como 1907	2−2	Paris FC	Como
10:30 CEST (UTC+2)	Gabrielloni 26'; Douvikas 86'	Report	Pagis 30', 37'	Stadium: Stadio Giuseppe Sinigaglia

28 July 2026 Friendly	Greuther Fürth	1–0	Paris FC	Herzogenaurach
16:00 CEST (UTC+2)		Report		Stadium: Adidas Home Ground

1 August 2026 Friendly	VfB Stuttgart	2–2	Paris FC	Stuttgart
16:00 CEST (UTC+2)	Jovanović 16'; Zagadou 54'	Report	Koleosho 71', 105'	Stadium: VfB Stuttgart Training Ground

8 August 2026 Friendly	Mainz 05	4–0	Paris FC	Mainz
17:30 CEST (UTC+2)	Gruber 10'; Tietz 32'; Königsdörffer 82' (pen.); Potulski 87'	Report		Stadium: Bruchwegstadion

12 August 2026 Friendly	Paris FC	v	AJ Auxerre
Cancelled

15 August 2026 Friendly	Angers SCO	3-2	Paris FC	Angers
17:30 CEST (UTC+2)	El Ouazzani 6' (pen.); Diatta 65'; Camara 83'	Report	Pagis 36'; Koleosho 42'	Stadium: Stade Raymond Kopa

=== In-Season ===
3 October 2026 Friendly	Paris FC	1–2	Red Star	Orly
11:00 CEST (UTC+2)	Sissoko 65'	Report	Cissé 7'; Durand 86'	Stadium: Paris FC Training Ground

13 November 2026 Friendly	Troyes	1-0	Paris FC	Troyes
11:00 CET (UTC+1)	Soukouna 45'			Stadium: Stade de l'Aube

== Competitions ==
=== Overall record ===
Competition	First match	Last match	Starting round	Final position	Record							
Competition	First match	Last match	Starting round	Final position	Pld	W	D	L	GF	GA	GD	Win %
Ligue 1	22 August 2026	29 May 2027	Matchday 1	TBD	11	7	2	2	21	10	+11	63.64
Coupe de France	TBD	TBD	Round of 64	TBD	0	0	0	0	0	0	+0	—
Total					11	7	2	2	21	10	+11	63.64

Last updated: 22 November 2026
Source: Soccerway

=== Ligue 1 ===
==== League table ====
Pos	Team	Pld	W	D	L	GF	GA	GD	Pts	Qualification or relegation
1	Paris Saint-Germain	11	8	2	1	25	12	+13	26	Qualification for the Champions League league phase
2	Paris FC	11	7	2	2	21	10	+11	23	Qualification for the Champions League league phase
3	Lille	11	6	3	2	14	8	+6	21	Qualification for the Champions League league phase
4	Lyon	11	6	2	3	16	9	+7	20	Qualification for the Champions League third qualifying round
5	Marseille	11	6	1	4	23	15	+8	19	Qualification for the Europa League league phase (Note: The 2026–27 Coupe de France winners also qualify for the Europa League league phase (or the sixth-placed team if the Coupe de France winners finish in the top five). If the Coupe de France winners finish in the top six, the Conference League spot will be passed to the seventh-placed team.)

Updated to match(es) played on 22 November 2026. Source: Ligue 1
Rules for classification: 1) Points; 2) Goal difference; 3) Head-to-head points; 4) Head-to-head goal difference; 5) Goals scored; 6) Wins; 7) Away wins; 8) Fair-play points; 9) Drawing of lots.
(Note: Head-to-head record is used only after all the matches between the teams in question have been played).

==== Results by round ====
Round	1	2	3	4	5	6	7	8	9	10	11	12	13	14	15	16	17	18	19	20	21	22	23	24	25	26	27	28	29	30	31	32	33	34
Ground	A	H	A	H	H	A	H	A	H	A	H	A	H	A	H	H	A	H	A	H	A	A	H	H	A	H	A	A	H	A	H	A	H	A
Result	D	W	W	D	W	L	W	L	W	W	W	-	-	-	-	-	-	-	-	-	-	-	-	-	-	-	-	-	-	-	-	-	-	-
Position	12	2	3	4	3	5	3	6	4	3	2	-	-	-	-	-	-	-	-	-	-	-	-	-	-	-	-	-	-	-	-	-	-	-

Updated to match(es) played on 22 November 2026. Source: Ligue 1
A = Away; H = Home; W = Win; D = Draw; L = Loss

==== Matches ====
The league schedule was released on 10 June 2026.

Win Draw Loss Fixture

22 August 2026 1	Troyes	0–0	Paris FC	Troyes
20:45 CEST (UTC+2)	Diaz (yellow card) 56'; Diop (yellow card) 69'	Report	Otávio (yellow card) 62'	Stadium: Stade de l'Aube; Attendance: 11,655; Referee: Marc Bollengier

30 August 2026 2	Paris FC	3–0	Nice	Paris
15:00 CEST (UTC+2)	Sinayoko 21' (pen.); Chergui 51'; Marchetti 89'	Report	Ndayishimiye (yellow card) 18'	Stadium: Stade Jean-Bouin; Attendance: 16,373; Referee: Jeremy Stinat

5 September 2026 3	Marseille	2–3	Paris FC	Marseille
20:45 CEST (UTC+2)	Gouiri 8', 53'	Report	Sinayoko 1', 19', 86' (pen.), (yellow card) 87'; Matondo (yellow card) 65'	Stadium: Stade Vélodrome; Attendance: 55,955; Referee: Clément Turpin

12 September 2026 4	Paris FC	0–0	Lyon	Paris
17:15 CEST (UTC+2)	Coppola (yellow card) 69'; Traoré (yellow card) 77'	Report	Openda (yellow card) 63'	Stadium: Stade Jean-Bouin; Attendance: 17,992; Referee: Guillaume Paradis

19 September 2026 5	Paris FC	2–1	Strasbourg	Paris
17:15 CEST (UTC+2)	Kebbal 18'; Lopez (yellow card) 40'; Pagis 57'; De Smet (yellow card) 90'; Koleosho (yellow card) 90+4'	Report	Sousa (yellow card) 63'; Yassine (yellow card) 67'; Mbow 88' (o.g.)	Stadium: Stade Jean-Bouin; Attendance: 17,236; Referee: Jérémy Stinat

10 October 2026 6	Lorient	1–0	Paris FC	Lorient
20:45 CEST (UTC+2)	Bernardeau 68'; Talbi (yellow card) 70'; Dujeux (yellow card) 90+6'	Report	Sinayoko (yellow card) 55'; Chergui (yellow card) 58'; Traoré (yellow card) 58'; Zabi (yellow card) 74'; Lopez (yellow card) 90+2'	Stadium: Stade du Moustoir; Attendance: 14,072; Referee: Jérôme Brisard

18 October 2026 7	Paris FC	4–3	Rennes	Paris
17:15 CEST (UTC+2)	Chergui (yellow card) 42'; Kebbal (yellow card) 67'; Traore (yellow card) 90+5'; Lopez 14', 45+4'; Sinayoko 76', 90+7' (pen.)	Report	Frankowski (yellow card) 23'; Cisse (yellow card) 32'; Thomasson (yellow card) 36'; Rouault (yellow card) 36'; Lepaul 29' (pen.), 74' (pen.), 88' (pen.)	Stadium: Stade Jean-Bouin; Attendance: 19,237; Referee: Bastien Dechepy

24 October 2026 8	Lens	2–1	Paris FC	Lens
20:45 CEST (UTC+2)	Thauvin (yellow card) 51' (goal) 63'; Baidoo (yellow card) 74'; Skoras (yellow card) 89'; Hazard 83'	Report	Mbow (yellow card) 28'; Lees-Melou (yellow card) 29'; Otávio (yellow card) 90+2'; Koleosho 45+2'	Stadium: Stade Bollaert-Delelis; Attendance: 37,819; Referee: Mathieu Vernice

1 November 2026 9	Paris FC	3–1	Monaco	Paris
17:15 CET (UTC+1)	Sinayoko 38', 44'; Pagis 74', (yellow card) 88'; Traoré (yellow card) 85'	Report	Balogun 65'; Vanderson (yellow card) 68'; Camara (yellow card) 88'	Stadium: Stade Jean-Bouin; Attendance: 19,087; Referee: Jérémy Stinat

7 November 2026 10	Auxerre	0–1	Paris FC	Auxerre
19:00 CET (UTC+1)	Archer (yellow card) 15'; Diomandé (yellow card) 16'; Danois (yellow card) 88'	Report	Lees-Melou (yellow card) 15'; Sinayoko 63'	Stadium: Stade de l'Abbé-Deschamps; Attendance: 15,488; Referee: Marc Bollengier

22 November 2026 11	Paris FC	4–0	Angers	Paris
15:00 CET (UTC+1)	Koleosho (yellow card) 43', (goal) 55'; Zabi 47'; Lopez 65'; Coppola 72'	Report	Allevinah (yellow card) 75'	Stadium: Stade Jean-Bouin; Referee: Aurélien Petit

27 November 2026 12	Brest	v	Paris FC	Brest
20:45 CET (UTC+1)				Stadium: Stade Francis-Le Blé

5 December 2026 13	Paris FC	v	Le Mans	Paris
20:45 CET (UTC+1)				Stadium: Stade Jean-Bouin

12 December 2026 14	Paris Saint-Germain	v	Paris FC	Paris
17:15 CET (UTC+1)				Stadium: Parc des Princes

2 January 2027 15	Paris FC	v	Le Havre	Paris
21:00 CET (UTC+1)				Stadium: Stade Jean-Bouin

17 January 2027 16	Paris FC	v	Toulouse	Paris
15:00 CET (UTC+1)				Stadium: Stade Jean-Bouin

23 January 2027 17	Lille	v	Paris FC	Lille
17:15 CET (UTC+1)				Stadium: Stade Pierre-Mauroy

30 January 2027 18	Paris FC	v	Auxerre	Paris
20:45 CET (UTC+1)				Stadium: Stade Jean-Bouin

6 February 2027 19	Strasbourg	v	Paris FC	Strasbourg
TBA CET (UTC+1)				Stadium: Stade de la Meinau

13 February 2027 20	Paris FC	v	Troyes	Paris
TBA CET (UTC+1)				Stadium: Stade Jean-Bouin

20 February 2027 21	Angers	v	Paris FC	Angers
TBA CET (UTC+1)				Stadium: Stade Raymond Kopa

27 February 2027 22	Le Mans	v	Paris FC	Le Mans
TBA CET (UTC+1)				Stadium: Stade Marie-Marvingt

6 March 2027 23	Paris FC	v	Brest	Paris
TBA CET (UTC+1)				Stadium: Stade Jean-Bouin

13 March 2027 24	Paris FC	v	Lorient	Paris
TBA CET (UTC+1)				Stadium: Stade Jean-Bouin

20 March 2027 25	Rennes	v	Paris FC	Rennes
TBA CET (UTC+1)				Stadium: Roazhon Park

3 April 2027 26	Paris FC	v	Paris Saint-Germain	Paris
TBA CEST (UTC+2)				Stadium: Stade Jean-Bouin

10 April 2027 27	Nice	v	Paris FC	Nice
TBA CEST (UTC+2)				Stadium: Allianz Riviera

17 April 2027 28	Toulouse	v	Paris FC	Toulouse
TBA CEST (UTC+2)				Stadium: Stadium de Toulouse

24 April 2027 29	Paris FC	v	Lens	Paris
TBA CEST (UTC+2)				Stadium: Stade Jean-Bouin

1 May 2027 30	Le Havre	v	Paris FC	Le Havre
TBA CEST (UTC+2)				Stadium: Stade Océane

8 May 2027 31	Paris FC	v	Lille	Paris
TBA CEST (UTC+2)				Stadium: Stade Jean-Bouin

16 May 2027 32	Monaco	v	Paris FC	Fontvieille
TBA CEST (UTC+2)				Stadium: Stade Louis II

22 May 2027 33	Paris FC	v	Marseille	Paris
TBA CEST (UTC+2)				Stadium: Stade Jean-Bouin

29 May 2027 34	Lyon	v	Paris FC	Lyon
TBA CEST (UTC+2)				Stadium: Parc Olympique Lyonnais
