= US Forbach =

Association football club in France

Forbach
- Full name: Union Sportive de Forbach
- Founded: 1909; 117 years ago
- Ground: Stade du Schlossberg
- Capacity: 5,400
- Chairman: Pascal Kirchstetter
- Manager: Fred Ustaritz
- League: Regional 1 Lorraine
- 2016–17: CFA 2 Group D, 12th (relegated)
Home colours

Union Sportive de Forbach Football (French pronunciation: [juːnjən spɔrtɪv də fɔʁbak]; commonly referred to as US Forbach or simply Forbach) is a French football club based in Forbach in the Lorraine region. The club was founded in 1909 under the name Sport Club Forbach and is a part of a sports club that consists of several other sports. The club played under the SCF emblem until 1919 before switching to its current name. Forbach celebrated its 100th anniversary in 2009. The club currently plays in the Regional 1 Lorraine, effectively the sixth tier of French football. Though currently an amateur club, the club did have a stint as a professional club from 1957–1966, playing in the Division 2.

== History ==
Sport Club Forbach was founded on 25 August 1909 through the merger of three clubs; FC Phönix, FC Triumph and FC Hansa. On 23 April 1919 it changed its name to Union Sportive de Forbach Football.

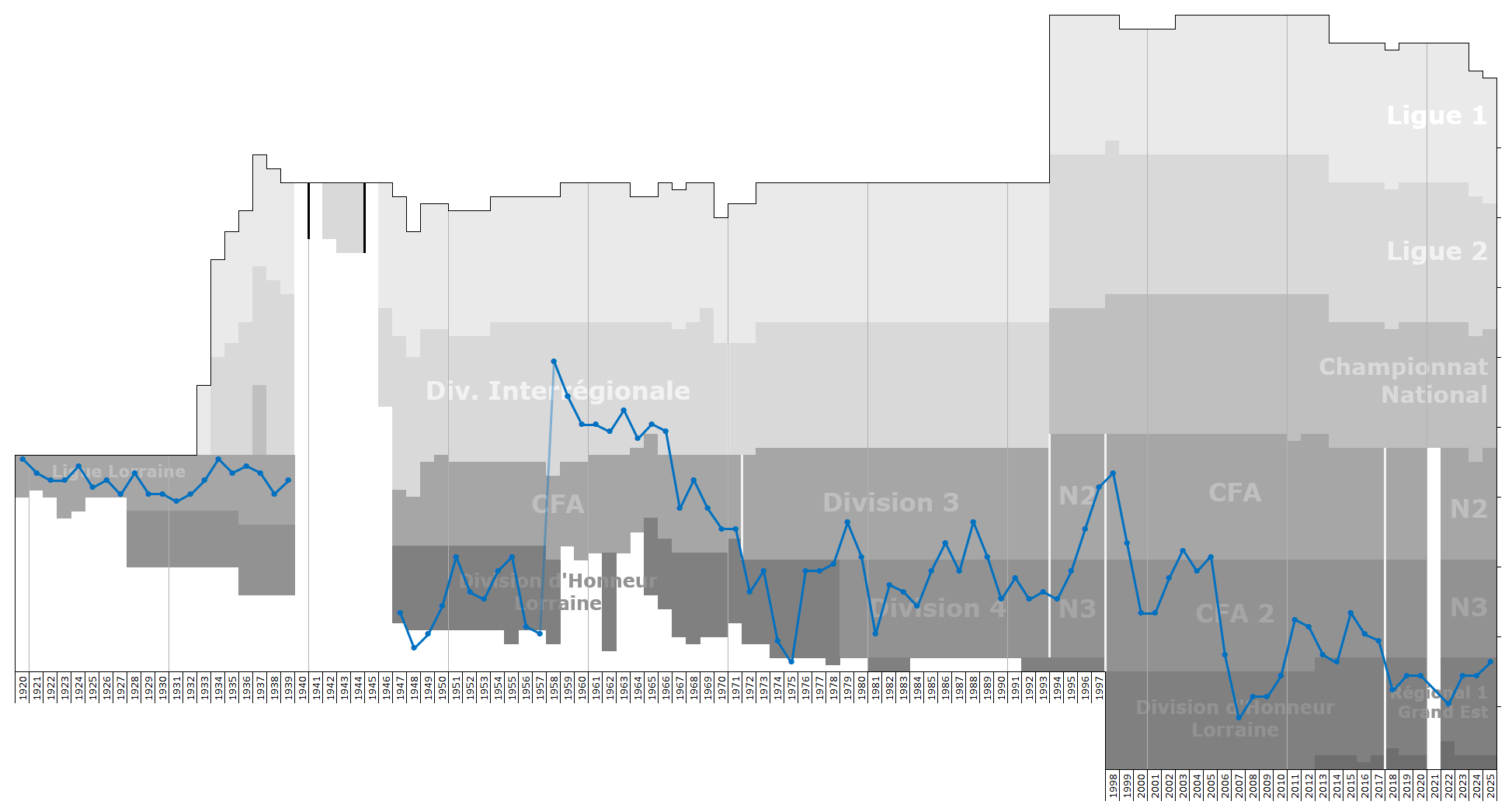
Historical league performance chart of US Forbach

In 1957 the club turned professional under sporting director Jean Gauche. In their first season in Ligue 2 they won their first six games, and ended up missing promotion to Ligue 1 by a point. In 1960 the club had their best run in the Coupe de France, reaching the 1/8th final round, before being defeated in extra time by AS Monaco. In 1967, with crowds dwindling, the club were forced to give up their professional status and return to amateur football.

Since 1968 the club have played their football mainly between the lower end of the national amateur competition (currently National 3) and the Division d'Honneur of Lorraine. Most recently, the club were promoted to CFA 2 in 2010, relegated in 2014, promoted again in 2015 and relegated again in 2017.
