= Hugo Roussey =

French footballer (born 1997)

Personal information
- Date of birth: 2 January 1997 (age 29)
- Place of birth: Mont-Saint-Aignan, France
- Height: 1.80 m (5 ft 11 in)
- Position: Striker

Team information
- Current team: Espaly

Youth career
- 2006–2015: Saint-Étienne

Senior career*
Years	Team	Apps	(Gls)
2015	Saint-Étienne	0	(0)
2015–2018	Saint-Étienne B	55	(13)
2018–2020	GOAL FC	38	(8)
2020–2022	Louhans-Cuiseaux	31	(8)
2022–2024	Thonon Evian	20	(2)
2024–	Espaly	10	(1)
- * Club domestic league appearances and goals as of 17:11, 21 January 2025 (UTC)

Hugo Roussey (born 2 January 1997) is a French professional footballer who plays as a striker for Championnat National 3 club Espaly.

== Club career ==
Roussey is a youth exponent from Saint-Étienne. He made his Coupe de la Ligue debut on 16 December 2015 against Paris Saint-Germain. He played the full game.
