= Diego Coppola =

Italian footballer (born 2003)

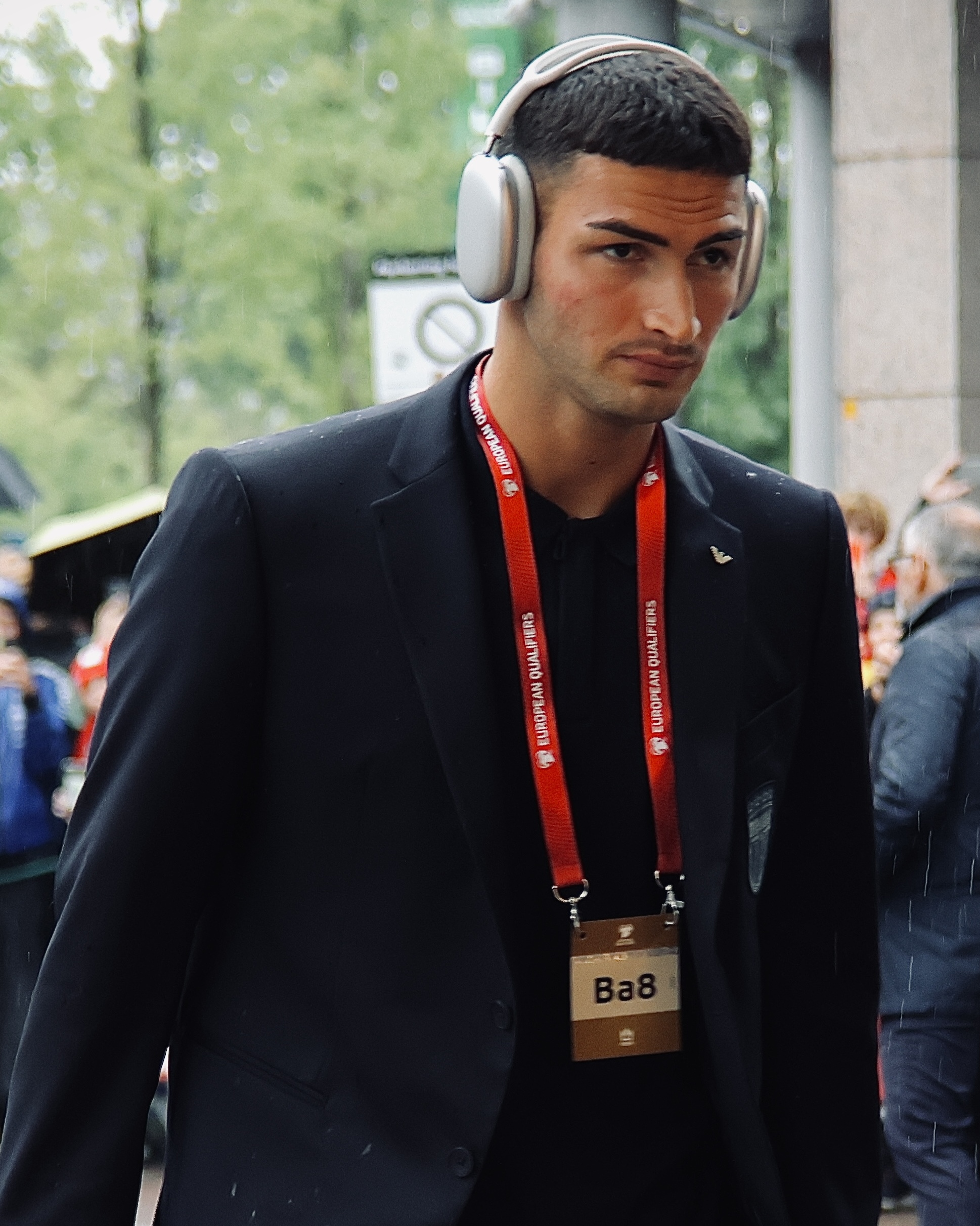
- Coppola with Italy in 2025

Personal information
- Date of birth: 28 December 2003 (age 22)
- Place of birth: Bussolengo, Italy
- Height: 1.92 m (6 ft 4 in)
- Position: Centre-back

Team information
- Current team: Paris FC
- Number: 42

Youth career
- 2020–2022: Hellas Verona

Senior career*
Years	Team	Apps	(Gls)
2021–2025	Hellas Verona	81	(4)
2025–2026	Brighton & Hove Albion	5	(0)
2026	→ Paris FC (loan)	13	(0)
2026–	Paris FC	11	(1)

International career^{‡}
2021	Italy U18	1	(0)
2021–2022	Italy U19	13	(1)
2022	Italy U20	1	(0)
2023–2025	Italy U21	11	(0)
2025–	Italy	3	(0)
- * Club domestic league appearances and goals as of 17:13, 22 November 2026 (UTC) ‡ National team caps and goals as of 25 September 2026

Diego Coppola (Italian pronunciation: [ˈdjɛ.ɡo ˈkɔp.po.la]; born 28 December 2003) is an Italian professional footballer who plays as a centre-back for Ligue 1 club Paris FC and the Italy national team.

== Club career ==
=== Hellas Verona ===
After coming through the youth ranks of Hellas Verona, Coppola made his professional debut with the first team on 15 December 2021, coming on as a substitute during a 4–3 Coppa Italia loss to Empoli. He subsequently made his Serie A debut on 15 January 2022, replacing Adrien Tameze at the 80th minute of the league game against Sassuolo. On 27 February, the defender made his first start for Verona, playing the entirety of the Serie A game against Venezia.

On 20 April 2022, Coppola officially extended his contract with the club, signing a new five-year deal. On 4 February 2024, he scored his first goal for the club in a 2–1 away defeat against Napoli.

=== Brighton & Hove Albion ===
On 17 June 2025, Coppola signed for Premier League club Brighton & Hove Albion for a reported fee of £9.4m, signing a five-year deal. He made his debut on 27 August, starting and earning an assist in Brighton's 6–0 away win over Oxford United in the EFL Cup. Four days later, he made his first Premier League appearance, coming on as a 95th minute substitute for Yankuba Minteh in a 2–1 comeback win against Manchester City.

=== Paris FC ===
On 29 January 2026, Coppola was loaned out to Ligue 1 side Paris FC until the end of the season. Later that year, on 16 July, Paris FC made the transfer permanent and signed a five-season contract with Coppola.

== International career ==
Coppola was born in Italy to an Italian father and a Dutch mother. He has represented Italy at various youth international levels, having played for the under-18, under-19 and under-20 national teams. In May and December 2022, Coppola was involved in training camps led by the Italian senior national team's manager, Roberto Mancini, and aimed to the most promising national talents.

Coppola received his first call-up to the senior Italy national team on 26 May 2025. He debuted on 6 June against Norway, starting and playing the full match, with Italy losing 3–0.

== Style of play ==
Being a centre-back who can play both in a back three or four, Coppola is known by his athleticism despite his height, as well as a notable tactical intelligence and, as perceived by football watchers, decent ball-playing skills. Positioning, marking, and anticipation are his strongest traits in the defensive phase of his game.

== Career statistics ==
=== Club ===
As of match played 22 November 2026

Appearances and goals by club, season and competition
Club	Season	League			National cup (Note: Includes Coppa Italia, FA Cup)		League cup (Note: Includes EFL Cup)		Other		Total	
Club	Season	Division	Apps	Goals	Apps	Goals	Apps	Goals	Apps	Goals	Apps	Goals
Hellas Verona	2021–22	Serie A	4	0	1	0	—		—		5	0
Hellas Verona	2022–23	Serie A	19	0	0	0	—		1 (Note: Appearance in Serie A relegation play-off)	0	20	0
Hellas Verona	2023–24	Serie A	24	2	2	0	—		—		26	2
Hellas Verona	2024–25	Serie A	34	2	1	0	—		—		35	2
Hellas Verona	Total		81	4	4	0	—		1	0	86	4
Brighton & Hove Albion	2025–26	Premier League	5	0	1	0	3	0	—		9	0
Paris FC (loan)	2025–26	Ligue 1	13	0	1	0	—		—		14	0
Paris FC	2026–27	Ligue 1	11	1	0	0	—		—		11	1
Paris FC	Paris FC total		24	1	1	0	—		—		25	1
Career total			110	5	6	0	3	0	1	0	120	5

=== International ===
As of match played 25 September 2026

Appearances and goals by national team and year
National team	Year	Apps	Goals
Italy	2025	2	0
Italy	2026	1	0
Total		3	0
