= Joachim Ichane =

French footballer (born 1986)

Personal information
- Date of birth: 27 June 1986 (age 40)
- Place of birth: Niort, France
- Height: 1.84 m (6 ft 0 in)
- Position: Defender

Team information
- Current team: Espaly

Senior career*
Years	Team	Apps	(Gls)
2005–2007	Chamois Niortais	3	(0)
2007–2010	Laval	64	(3)
2010–2012	Reims	21	(2)
2012–2013	Cherbourg	34	(1)
2013–2014	Fréjus Saint-Raphaël	19	(0)
2014–2020	Le Puy	129	(12)
2020	Le Puy B	4	(0)
2020–2021	Angoulême	4	(0)
2021–	Espaly		
- * Club domestic league appearances and goals

Joachim Ichane (born 27 June 1986) is a French professional footballer who plays as a defender for Championnat National 3 club Espaly.

== Career ==
Ichane started his career with Chamois Niortais, where he made three league appearances, before joining Championnat National side Laval in 2007. He played a total of 64 league matches for Laval and was part of the team that won promotion to Ligue 2 in 2009. However, he suffered a knee injury in the summer of the same year, which meant he did not make an appearance during the 2009–10 season and subsequently refused a new deal at the end of the campaign.

On 7 June 2010, Ichane signed for Reims on a two-year contract.

In July 2012, Ichane joined Championnat National side Cherbourg.

== Honours ==
Chamois Niortais

- Championnat National: 2005–06
