= William Tchuameni =

Cameroonian footballer

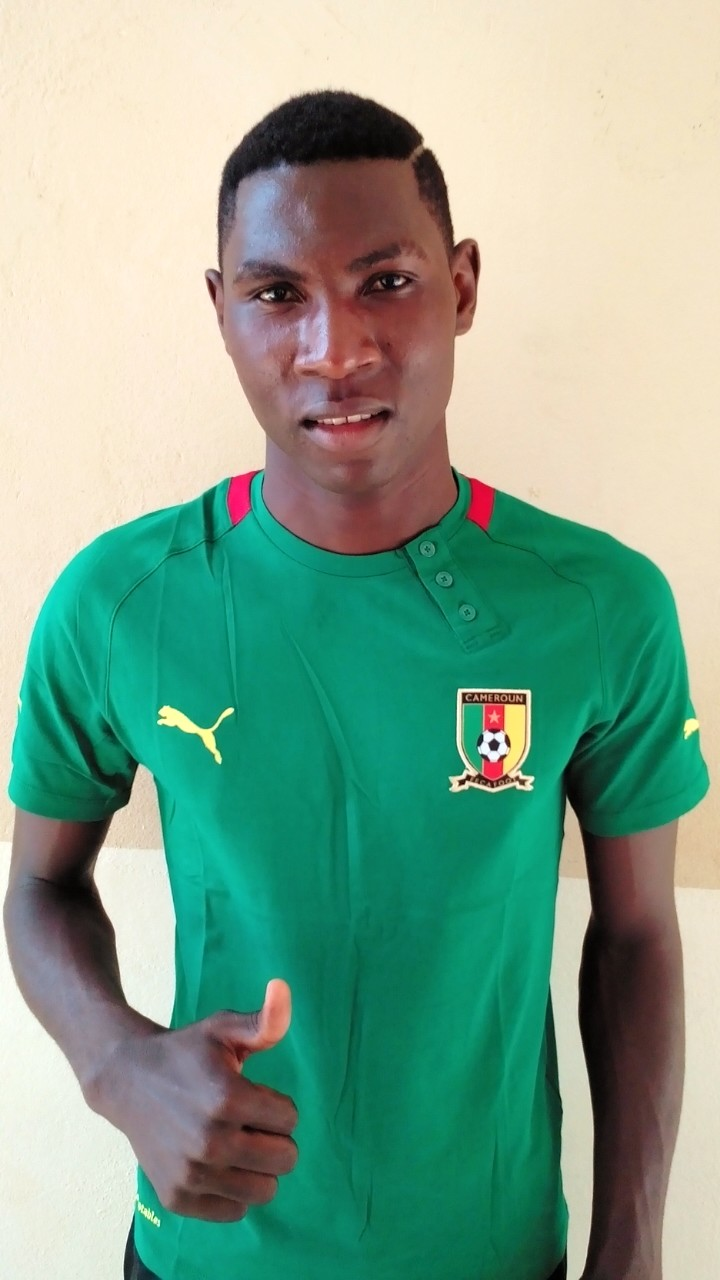

Personal information
- Full name: William Tchuameni Kouemo
- Date of birth: 25 December 1996 (age 29)
- Place of birth: Bana, Cameroon
- Height: 1.92 m (6 ft 4 in)
- Position: Striker

Team information
- Current team: Reims Sainte-Anne

Senior career*
Years	Team	Apps	(Gls)
2012–2013	Camrail		
2013–2016	Unisport FC		
2016–2017	Feirense	3	(1)
2017–2019	SønderjyskE	12	(1)
2019–2020	Inter Zaprešić	9	(0)
2022	Épernay		
2022	Prix-lès-Mézières	4	(3)
2022–2023	Épernay	11	(6)
2023–	Reims Sainte-Anne	5	(1)
- * Club domestic league appearances and goals as of 16 December 2023

William Tchuameni Kouemo (born 25 December 1996) is a Cameroonian professional footballer who plays as a striker for Reims Sainte-Anne in the French fifth-tier Championnat National 3.

== Career ==
=== SønderjyskE ===
Tchuameni joined Danish club SønderjyskE in July 2017. He left the club after two years.
