= Pablo Pagis =

French footballer (born 2002)

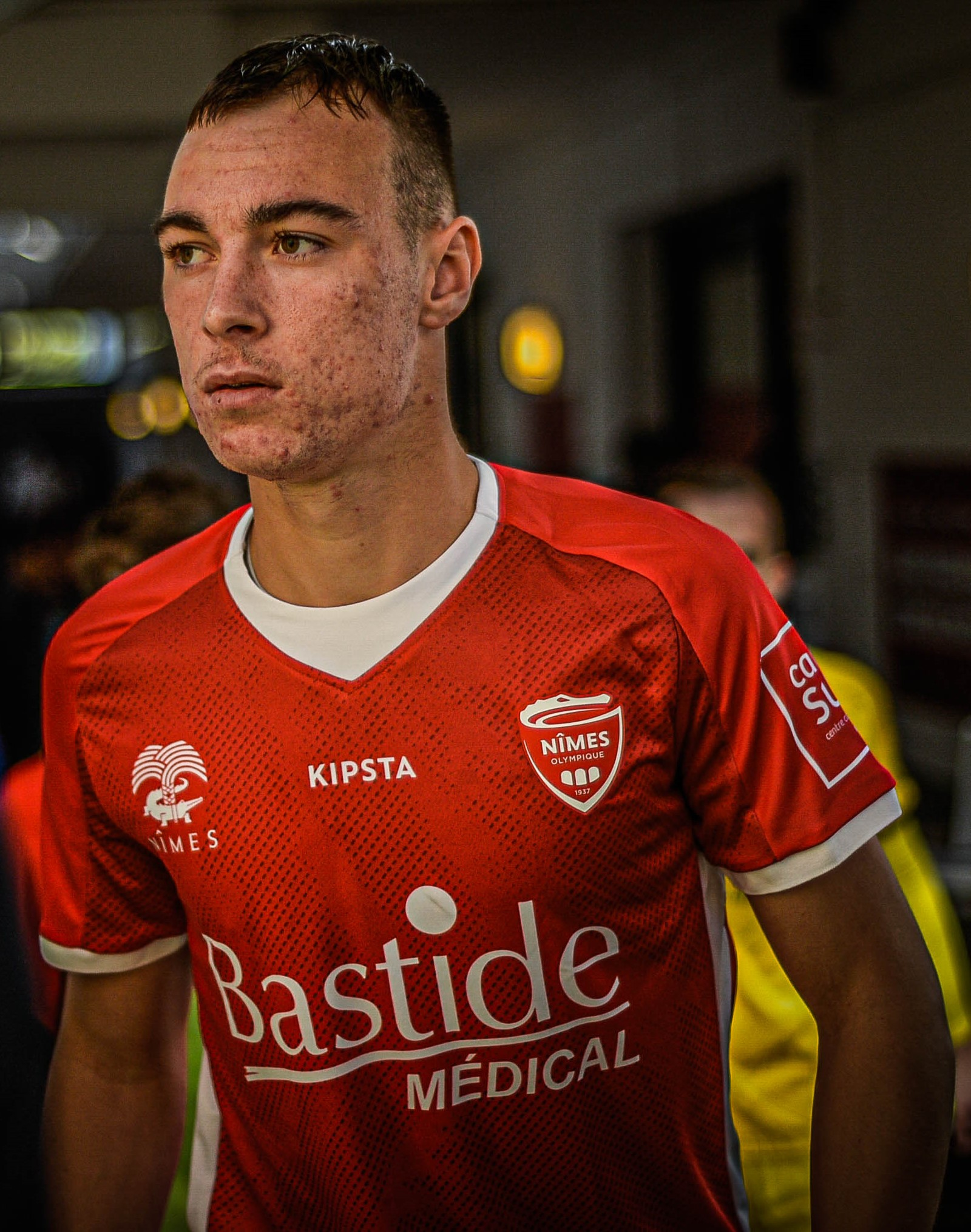
- Pagis with Nîmes in 2022

Personal information
- Date of birth: 29 December 2002 (age 23)
- Place of birth: Montbéliard, France
- Height: 1.81 m (5 ft 11 in)
- Position: Forward

Team information
- Current team: Paris FC
- Number: 7

Youth career
- 2007-2012: US Pont-Péan
- 2012–2018: Rennes
- 2018–2021: Lorient

Senior career*
Years	Team	Apps	(Gls)
2020–2024	Lorient II	31	(10)
2021–2026	Lorient	57	(14)
2022–2023	→ Nîmes (loan)	32	(5)
2024	→ Laval (loan)	16	(4)
2026–	Paris FC	10	(2)

International career^{‡}
2026–	France	1	(0)
- * Club domestic league appearances and goals as of 7 November 2026 ‡ National team caps and goals as of 15 November 2026

Pablo Pagis (born 29 December 2002) is a French professional footballer who plays as a forward for Ligue 1 club Paris FC and the France national team.

== Club career ==
Pagis is a youth product of US Pont Péan, Rennes, Lorient and began his senior career with Lorient's reserves in 2020. On 24 December 2021, he signed his first professional contract with the club. On 31 August 2022, he joined Nîmes on a season long loan. He made his professional debut with Nîmes as a late substitute in a 3–2 Ligue 2 loss to Valenciennes on 2 September 2022.

On 8 January 2024, he was loaned to Laval in the French Ligue 2 for the rest of the season.

On 17 July 2026, Pagis signed with Ligue 1 side Paris FC.

== International career ==
Pagis made his debut for the France national team on 15 November 2026 in a UEFA Nations League game against Turkey, he substituted Michael Olise in the 85th minute of a 2–1 victory.

== Personal life ==
Pagis is the son of the French former footballer Mickaël Pagis.

== Career statistics ==
As of match played 7 November 2026

Appearances and goals by club, season and competition
Club	Season	League			Cup		Europe		Other		Total	
Club	Season	Division	Apps	Goals	Apps	Goals	Apps	Goals	Apps	Goals	Apps	Goals
Lorient II	2020–21	National 2	6	0	—		—		—		6	0
Lorient II	2021–22	National 2	23	10	—		—		—		23	10
Lorient II	2023–24	National 2	1	0	—		—		—		1	0
Lorient II	2024–25	National 2	1	0	—		—		—		1	0
Lorient II	Total		31	10	—		—		—		31	10
Nîmes (loan)	2022–23	Ligue 2	32	5	3	3	—		—		35	8
Lorient	2023–24	Ligue 1	3	0	—		—		—		3	0
Lorient	2024–25	Ligue 2	26	4	2	1	—		—		28	5
Lorient	2025–26	Ligue 2	28	10	4	0	—		—		32	10
Lorient	Total		57	14	6	1	—		—		63	15
Laval (loan)	2023–24	Ligue 2	16	4	2	0	—		—		18	4
Paris FC	2026–27	Ligue 1	10	2	0	0	—		—		10	2
Career total			146	35	11	4	0	0	0	0	157	39

=== International ===
As of match played 15 November 2026

Appearances and goals by national team and year
National team	Year	Apps	Goals
France	2026	1	0
Total		1	0

== Honours ==
Lorient

- Ligue 2: 2024–25
