= Elson Mendes =

Cape Verdean footballer

Personal information
- Full name: Elson Mendes da Silva
- Date of birth: 18 September 2005 (age 21)
- Place of birth: Lisbon, Portugal
- Height: 1.76 m (5 ft 9 in)
- Position: Defensive midfielder

Team information
- Current team: Kasımpaşa

Youth career
- 2012–2020: Reims
- 2020–2023: Sedan

Senior career*
Years	Team	Apps	(Gls)
2023–2025	Sochaux II	21	(3)
2023–2026	Sochaux	49	(2)
2026–	Kasımpaşa	0	(0)

International career^{‡}
2025–	Cape Verde	2	(0)
- * Club domestic league appearances and goals as of 23 June 2026 ‡ National team caps and goals as of 13:23, 30 May 2025 (UTC)

Elson Mendes da Silva (Portuguese: [ˈɛl.sɔn ˈmẽ.dɨʒ dɐ ˈsil.vɐ]; born 18 September 2005) is a professional footballer who plays as a defensive midfielder for Turkish Süper Lig club Kasımpaşa. Born in Portugal, he plays for the Cape Verde national team.

== Club career ==
Born in Portugal, Mendes moved to France at age 7 and joined the academy of Reims, followed by Sedan. In 2023, he moved to Sochaux and on 24 November 2024 he signed his first professional contract with Sochaux until 2027.

In the summer of 2026, Mendes signed with Kasımpaşa in Turkey.

== International career ==
Born in Portugal, Mendes is of Cape Verdean descent. He was called up to the Cape Verde national team for a set of friendlies in May 2025.
