= Jimmy Evans (footballer, born 1999) =

Nigerian footballer (born 1999)

Personal information
- Full name: Jimmy Evans Oghenerukwe
- Date of birth: 13 March 1999 (age 27)
- Place of birth: Lagos, Nigeria
- Height: 1.83 m (6 ft 0 in)
- Position: Right winger

Team information
- Current team: Universidad Católica

Senior career*
Years	Team	Apps	(Gls)
2019–2024	Rocha	55	(13)
2022	→ Danubio (loan)	11	(1)
2023	→ Mushuc Runa (loan)	27	(2)
2024	Betim	0	(0)
2024–2026	Nancy	55	(5)
2026–	Universidad Católica	0	(0)
- * Club domestic league appearances and goals as of 12 May 2026

Jimmy Evans Oghenerukwe (born 13 March 1999) is a Nigerian professional footballer who plays as a right winger for Ecuadorian club Universidad Católica.

== Career ==
Evans joined Uruguayan club Rocha in 2019 after accompanying his friend from Nigeria for trials with the club. He won the Uruguayan Segunda División Amateur title in his first season with the club.

Evans joined Danubio on loan in January 2022. He made his professional debut for the club on 8 February 2022 by scoring his team's only goal in a 1–0 league win against Cerrito.

Evans joined Brazilian club Betim in April 2024 after terminating his contract with Rocha. In August 2024, he joined French club Nancy.

== Career statistics ==
As of 1 January 2023

Appearances and goals by club, season and competition
Club	Season	League			Cup		Total	
Club	Season	Division	Apps	Goals	Apps	Goals	Apps	Goals
Rocha	2019	Uruguayan Segunda División Amateur	25	10	—		25	10
Rocha	2020	Uruguayan Segunda División	13	1	—		13	1
Rocha	2021	USD	17	2	—		17	2
Rocha	Total		55	13	0	0	55	13
Danubio (loan)	2022	Uruguayan Primera División	11	1	1	0	12	1
Career total			66	14	1	0	67	14

== Honours ==
Rocha

- Uruguayan Segunda División Amateur: 2019

Nancy

- Championnat National: 2024–25
