= Matthis Riou =

French association footballer (born 2001)

Personal information
- Date of birth: 19 January 2001 (age 25)
- Place of birth: Plougrescant, France
- Height: 1.88 m (6 ft 2 in)
- Position: Centre-back

Youth career
- Tréguier
- 2013–2020: Guingamp

Senior career*
Years	Team	Apps	(Gls)
2020–2024	Guingamp II	23	(0)
2021–2025	Guingamp	75	(0)
2025–2026	RAAL La Louvière	1	(0)
- * Club domestic league appearances and goals as of 11 May 2026

Matthis Riou (French pronunciation: [mat‿is ʁju]; born 19 January 2001) is a French professional footballer who plays as a centre-back.

== Career ==
A youth product of Tréguier, Riou signed with the youth academy of Guingamp in 2013 and worked his way up their youth teams. He debuted with their reserves in 2020. On 4 June 2021, he signed his first professional contract with the club. He made his professional debut with Guingamp in a 2–0 Ligue 2 loss to Amiens SC on 14 August 2021.

In the summer of 2025, Riou signed a three-year contract with RAAL La Louvière in Belgium. The contract was mutually terminated in June 2026.

== Career statistics ==
As of 19 January 2024

Club	Season	League			Cup		Total	
Club	Season	Division	Apps	Goals	Apps	Goals	Apps	Goals
Guingamp	2021–22	Ligue 2	17	0	1	0	18	0
Guingamp	2022–23	Ligue 2	19	0	—		19	0
Guingamp	2023–24	Ligue 2	11	0	3	0	14	0
Total			47	0	4	0	51	0
