= Stade du Schlossberg =

Multi-purpose stadium in Forbach, France

- Location within France
- Location: Forbach, Grand Est, France
- Coordinates: 49.18°N 6.904°E
- Capacity: 5,400

Construction
- Built: 30 September 1923

Tenants
- US Forbach

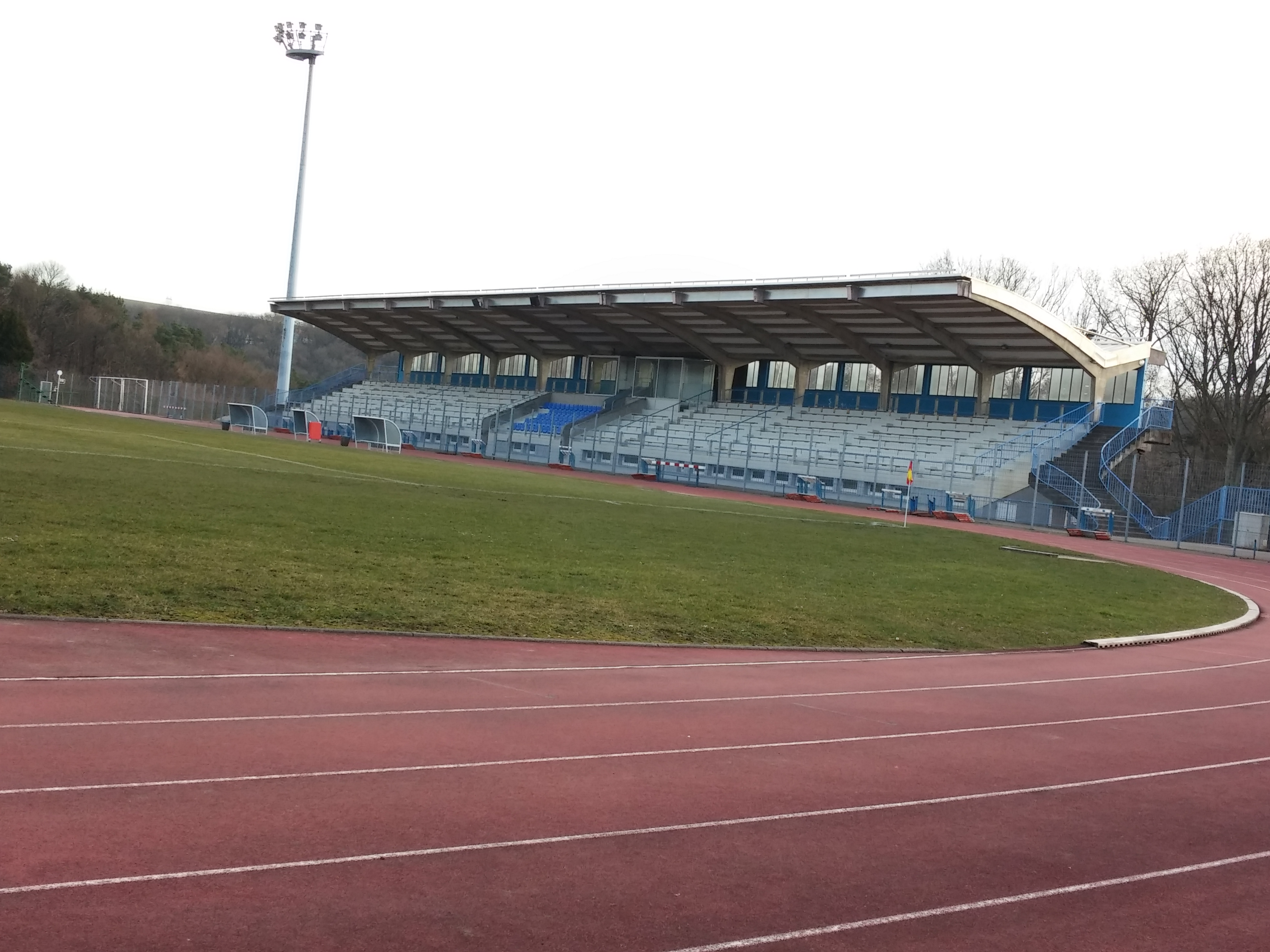
Schlossberg1.jpg

The Stade du Schlossberg is a multi-purpose stadium located in Forbach, France.

== History ==
The stadium was inaugurated in Schlossberg on 30 September 1923 during a friendly match between the US Forbach and the Club Français from Paris (2–2) in front of over 3,000 enthusiastic people.

The construction costs amounted to 376,000 gold francs and were repaid by 1939 just before the Second World War. The stadium, as did the city, suffered greatly during the 118 days of fighting. It was renovated and on 17 May 1953 the Lorraine team beat the team from Saar 4–1.

On Monday Easter 1957 the local club in front of 7,114 spectators beat Stade de Reims and was embarked on a professional period (of 1957 to 1966). In that first season, 9,753 attended a clash between the leaders of the division for seven games (Forbach and Bordeaux) (0–0) and USF finally missed rising to the 1st division by a point.

The stadium was then endowed with its current honorary stand and a lighting system. The Coupe de France is no longer played there and it now has a capacity of 5,400 places.

The stadium Schlossberg is not only for football. It has an athletics track and is also used every year for the international athletics meeting of Forbach.
