= Stade Fred-Aubert =

Football stadium in France

Stade Fred Aubert
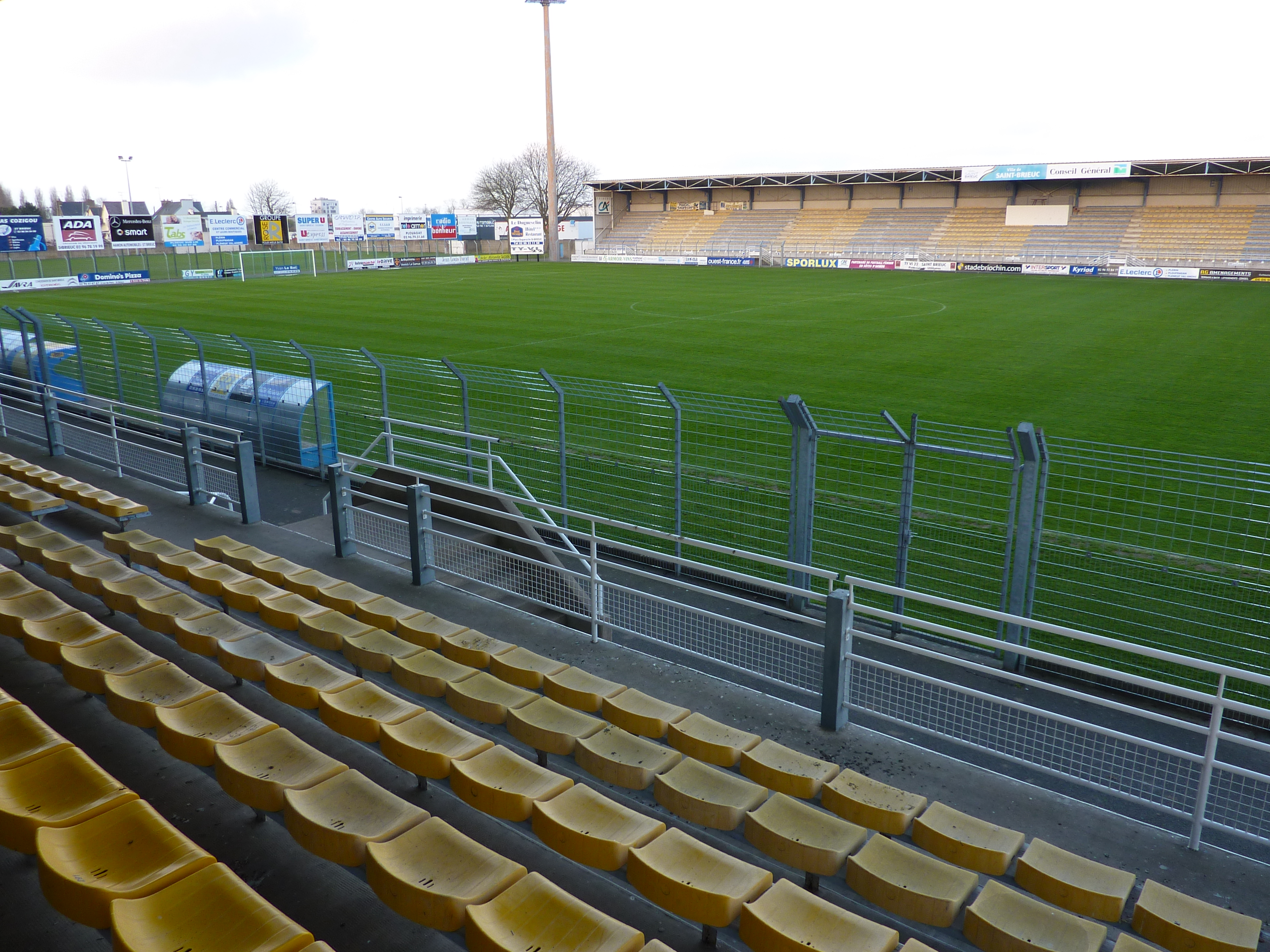

- Location within France
- Address: 1 rue Joseph Le Brix; 22 000 Saint-Brieuc
- Coordinates: 48.50883°N 2.74368°W
- Capacity: 10,600
- Surface: Natural grass

Construction
- Built: 1990

Tenants
- Stade Briochin; En Avant de Guingamp (féminines)

The Stade Fred-Aubert (French pronunciation: [stad fʁɛd‿obɛʁ]) is a football stadium located at Saint-Brieuc, France. Inaugurated in 1990, it has since hosted the home games of Stade Briochin. This stadium also hosts the home matches of the women's section of En Avant Guingamp.

It is named after Frederick Louis Charles "Fred" Aubert (19 November 1897 – 14 May 1940). Born in Saint-Brieuc, Aubert was president of the order of lawyers, municipal councilor of Saint-Brieuc and chairman of Stade Briochin starting in 1929.

== Stadium ==
Fred Aubert stadium has two covered grandstands, on the north and the south side. The seats are blue and yellow, corresponding to the home shirt colors of Stade Briochin.

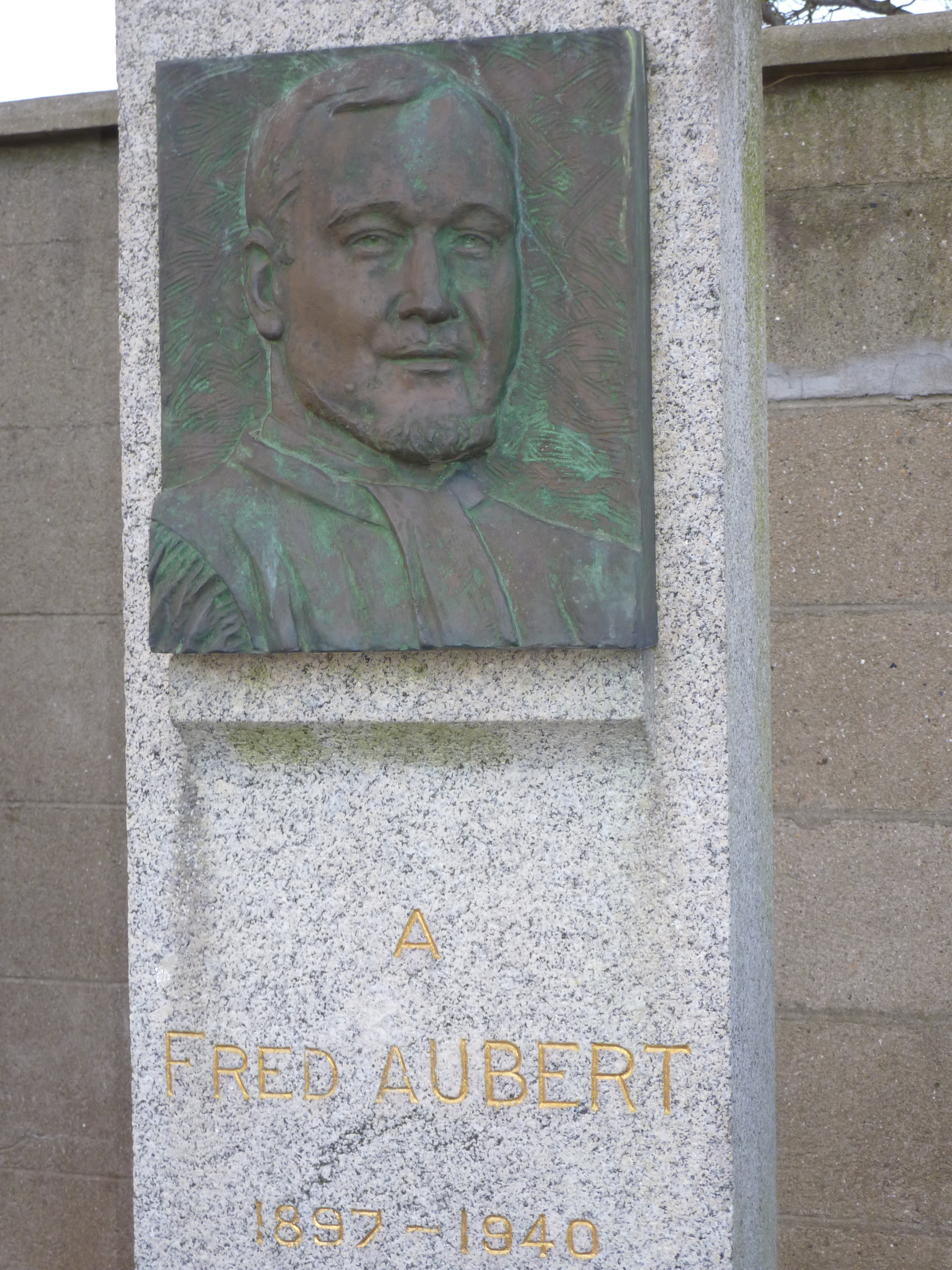
Fred Aubert stele erected in memory at the stadium entrance

Next to the stadium, teams of the club Stade Briochin train, especially on the synthetic field that borders one of the stands. Many schools also use the area during the hours of EPS.

== Location ==
The stadium is located along the expressway RN12 (Rennes-Brest) and line 10 of Transports urbains briochins (TUB).

== Anecdotes ==
- It is in this forum that Stade Briochin had its finest hours in the mid-1990s.
- The French women's team defeated Serbia 2–0 in qualifying for the European Nations Championship in 2008.
- Despite the age of the stadium, the Brittany national football team has played one match there on 20 May 2008, a friendly against Congo (3–1).
- During the summer preparation, the Breton professional clubs met for the Paul-Hesran Challenge, created in honor of the former President of the League of Brittany and Stade Briochin. This challenge was won by the Stade Brestois in 2010 and 2014, and by the En Avant de Guingamp 2011, 2012 and 2013.
- This stadium will host some matches of the U20 Women's World Cup in 2018.
- On 5 December 2015 the stadium hosted the Stade Brestois (L2) for the 8th round of the Coupe de France. It had been 18 years since Fred Aubert stadium had not received a professional club. The score resulted in a victory for the Griffons 2–0 and qualifying them for the finals of the Round of 32.
