= Alexis Gouletquer =

French footballer (born 1999)

Personal information
- Date of birth: 13 July 1999 (age 27)
- Place of birth: Lille, France
- Height: 1.77 m (5 ft 10 in)
- Position: Forward

Team information
- Current team: Haguenau
- Number: 21

Senior career*
Years	Team	Apps	(Gls)
2018	Boulogne II	6	(1)
2018–2020	Olympique Marcquois	32	(8)
2020–2022	Le Mans II	27	(16)
2020–2022	Le Mans	4	(0)
2022–2023	C'Chartres	14	(4)
2023	Châteaubriant	15	(4)
2023–2024	Racing Besançon	20	(5)
2024–	Haguenau	11	(5)
- * Club domestic league appearances and goals as of 7 December 2024

Alexis Gouletquer (born 13 July 1999) is a French professional footballer who plays as a forward for Championnat National 1 club Haguenau.

== Professional career ==
On 16 January 2020, Gouletquer signed his first professional contract with Le Mans FC. Gouletquer made his professional debut with Le Mans in a 0-0 Ligue 2 tie with Rodez AF on 14 February 2020.

On 24 June 2022, Gouletquer signed with C'Chartres in the fourth-tier Championnat National 2.
