= Jovany Ikanga =

French footballer (born 2002)

Personal information
- Full name: Jovany Ikanga A Ngele
- Date of birth: 24 March 2002 (age 24)
- Place of birth: Paris, France
- Height: 1.79 m (5 ft 10 in)
- Position: Forward

Team information
- Current team: Red Star
- Number: 23

Youth career
- 2008–2021: Red Star

Senior career*
Years	Team	Apps	(Gls)
2021–	Red Star	75	(16)
2024–2025	→ Dijon (loan)	29	(7)
- * Club domestic league appearances and goals as of 11 May 2026

Jovany Ikanga A Ngele (born 24 March 2002) is a French professional footballer who plays as a forward for Ligue 2 club Red Star.

== Career ==
Having joined the club at the age of six, Ikanga is a product of the youth academy of Red Star. After having made his senior debut for the club in a Championnat National match against Boulogne in 2021, he signed his first professional contract on 4 August 2022. In the 2022–23 season, he went on to finish as Red Star's top scorer in the league with nine goals, and was described by Le Parisien as the "revelation" of his team. The following year, he was crowned a Championnat National champion with Red Star, earning promotion to Ligue 2.

On 8 September 2024, Ikanga was sent on loan to Dijon in the Championnat National for the rest of the season. He provided an assist on his debut in a 2–0 win over Paris 13 Atletico.

Ikanga returned to Red Star after his loan at Dijon. On 23 August 2025, he scored a brace in a 4–0 win over Guingamp in Ligue 2. On 19 September, he scored in a 1–0 win over Nancy, sending Red Star to the top of the league.

== Personal life ==
Born in France, Ikanga is of Congolese descent from the Democratic Republic of the Congo.

Ikanga's original headshot on EA Sports FC 27 made him a recognised figure across social media, although EA Sports recently changed it to be in line with other players.

== Honours ==
Red Star

- Championnat National: 2023–24
