= FC Espaly =

Football club in Haute-Loire, France

- Founded: 1967
- Ground: Stade du Viouzou
- Capacity: 460
- President: Christian Perbet
- Manager: Lionel Vaillant
- League: National 3 Group I
- 2023–24: National 3 Group K, 5th of 14
- Website: fcespaly.com

Football Club Espaly is a football club based in Espaly-Saint-Marcel in France's Haute-Loire department. As of the 2024–25 season, it competes in the Championnat National 3, the fifth tier of the French football league system. The club plays its home matches at the Stade Viouzou, which has a seating capacity of 460.

== History ==
FC Espaly was founded in 1967. In the early 2010s, longtime club employee Christian Perbet became president of the club, taking over while the senior team was in the Départemental 1, which is the ninth level of French football. By the end of the 2022–23 season, Espaly had achieved promotion to the Championnat National 3, the fifth division in France.

On 15 January 2025, Espaly played against Ligue 1 giant Paris Saint-Germain (PSG) in the round of 32 of the Coupe de France. The match, hosted in Clermont-Ferrand's Stade Marcel-Michelin, resulted in a 4–2 victory for PSG. Espaly scored the opening goal thanks to a header by Kévis Gjeçi in the 3rd minute, prior to conceding two goals scored by Warren Zaïre-Emery and Désiré Doué respectively. Maxence Fournel equalized for Espaly in the 71st minute, but late goals by Bradley Barcola in the 88th minute and Gonçalo Ramos in the 90+2nd minute wrapped up the victory for the Parisians.
