= 2025–26 ES Troyes AC season =

French football club's 2025-26 season

ES Troyes AC
2025–26 season
- Stadium: Stade de l'Aube
- Ligue 2: 1st (promoted)
Home colours	Away colours	Third colours

The 2025–26 season was the 40th in the history of Espérance Sportive Troyes Aube Champagne and the club’s third consecutive season in Ligue 2 of the French football league. In addition to the domestic league, Troyes participated in the Coupe de France. The season began on 9 August.

== Squad ==
=== Transfers In ===
Pos.	Player	Transferred from	Fee	Date	Source
DF	(Portugal) Abdu Conté	(Switzerland) Young Boys	Loan return	30 June 2025	
DF	(Algeria) Yasser Larouci	(England) Watford	Loan return	30 June 2025	
FW	(Sweden) Amar Fatah	(Netherlands) Willem II	Loan return	30 June 2025	
MF	(Democratic Republic of the Congo) Metinho	(Switzerland) Basel	Loan return	30 June 2025	
DF	(Senegal) Abdoulaye Ndiaye	(France) Brest	Loan return	30 June 2025	
DF	(France) Lucas Maronnier	(France) Guingamp	Undisclosed	1 July 2025	
GK	(Burkina Faso) Hillel Konaté	(France) Châteauroux	Free	7 July 2025	
MF	(France) Antoine Mille	(France) Pau FC	Undisclosed	30 July 2025	
FW	(Morocco) Tawfik Bentayeb	(Morocco) Union Touarga	Loan	30 August 2025	
MF	(Nigeria) Elijah Odede	(Moldova) Sheriff Tiraspol	€3,000,000	1 September 2025	

=== Transfers Out ===
Pos.	Player	Transferred to	Fee	Date	Source
MF	(Comoros) Youssouf M'Changama		End of contract	1 July 2025	
GK	(Belgium) Corentin Michel		End of contract	1 July 2025	
FW	(France) Renaud Ripart		End of contract	1 July 2025	
FW	(France) Nicolas de Préville		End of contract	1 July 2025	
MF	(France) Kyliane Dong	(Germany) FC Augsburg	End of contract	1 July 2025	
FW	(Mauritania) Pape Ibnou Ba		Contract terminated	1 July 2025	
MF	(Burkina Faso) Cyriaque Irié	(Germany) SC Freiburg	€10,000,000	1 July 2025	
DF	(Algeria) Mehdi Tahrat	(Thailand) Kanchanaburi Power	End of contract	1 July 2025	
MF	(Comoros) Rafiki Saïd	(Belgium) Standard Liège	€2,500,000	7 July 2025	
DF	(Ivory Coast) Junior Diaz	(France) Brest	Loan + €1,000,000	13 July 2025	
FW	(Sweden) Amar Fatah	(Scotland) Dundee United	Loan	14 July 2025	
MF	(Democratic Republic of the Congo) Metinho	(Switzerland) Basel	Undisclosed	17 July 2025	
MF	(France) Abdoulaye Kanté	(England) Middlesbrough	€3,000,000	29 July 2025	
DF	(Senegal) Abdoulaye Ndiaye	(Italy) Parma	€6,500,000	5 August 2025	
DF	(Portugal) Abdu Conté	(Portugal) Casa Pia	Undisclosed	29 August 2025	
DF	(Algeria) Yasser Larouci	(Greece) Kifisia	Loan	12 September 2025	

== Friendlies ==
25 July 2025	Troyes	0–0	Dijon

2 August 2025	Troyes	0–1	Metz

== Competitions ==
=== Overall record ===
Competition	First match	Last match	Starting round	Record							
Competition	First match	Last match	Starting round	Pld	W	D	L	GF	GA	GD	Win %
Liguee 2	9 August 2025	8 May 2025	Matchday 1	6	4	1	1	11	5	+6	66.67
Coupe de France				0	0	0	0	0	0	+0	—
Total				6	4	1	1	11	5	+6	66.67

Last updated: 20 September 2025
Source: Competitions

=== Ligue 2 ===
==== League table ====
Pos	Team	Pld	W	D	L	GF	GA	GD	Pts	Promotion or Relegation
1	Troyes (C, P)	34	20	7	7	60	33	+27	67	Promotion to Ligue 1
2	Le Mans (P)	34	16	14	4	50	31	+19	62	Promotion to Ligue 1
3	Saint-Étienne	34	18	6	10	59	38	+21	60	Qualification for promotion play-off semi-final
4	Red Star	34	16	10	8	45	37	+8	58	Qualification for promotion play-off quarter-final
5	Rodez	34	15	13	6	45	39	+6	58	Qualification for promotion play-off quarter-final

Source: Ligue 2
Rules for classification: 1) Points; 2) Goal difference; 3) Number of goals scored; 4) Head-to-head goal difference; 5) Fair play points
(C) Champions; (P) Promoted

==== Results summary ====
Overall								Home						Away					
Pld	W	D	L	GF	GA	GD	Pts	W	D	L	GF	GA	GD	W	D	L	GF	GA	GD
6	4	1	1	11	5	+6	13	4	0	0	11	3	+8	0	1	1	0	2	−2

Last updated: 20 September 2025.

==== Results by round ====
Round	1	2	3	4	5	6
Ground	H	A	H	A	H	H
Result	W	D	W	L	W	W
Position						

Updated to match(es) played on 20 September 2025. Source:
A = Away; H = Home; W = Win; D = Draw; L = Loss

==== Matches ====
9 August 2025 1	Troyes	2–1	Grenoble	Troyes
20:00	Assoumou 8'; Adeline 75'; El Idrissy (yellow card) 84'		Diba (yellow card) 27'; Bangré 34', (red card) 45'	Stadium: Stade de l'Aube; Attendance: 5,418; Referee: Brendan Roffet

15 August 2025 2	Clermont	0–0	Troyes	Clermont-Ferrand
20:00	Gastien (yellow card) 64'; Bongué { (yellow card) 74'		Detourbet (yellow card) 36'; Philiponeau (yellow card) 43'; Boura (yellow card) 43'	Stadium: Stade Gabriel-Montpied; Attendance: 4,320; Referee: Alexandre Perreau-Niel

23 August 2025 3	Troyes	1–0	Montpellier	Troyes
20:00	El Idrissy (yellow card) 12'; Adeline 31'; Assoumou (yellow card) 51'; Diakité (yellow card) 90+3'		Sainte-Luce (red card) 19'; Everson Junior (yellow card) 57'	Stadium: Stade de l'Aube; Attendance: 5,651; Referee: Aurélien Petit

29 August 2025 4	Dunkerque	2–0	Troyes	Dunkirk
20:00	Bardeli 55'; Zossou 63'; Lavín (yellow card) 84'		Lemaître (yellow card) 84'	Stadium: Stade Marcel-Tribut; Attendance: 3,936; Referee: Tifenn Leprodhomme

12 September 2025 5	Troyes	3–0	Nancy	Troyes
20:00	Bentayeb 20', 50' (pen.), (penalty missed) 55'; Assoumou (yellow card) 31'; Adeline 74'			Stadium: Stade de l'Aube; Attendance: 6,939; Referee: Eddy Rosier

20 September 2025 6	Troyes	5–2	Guingamp	Troyes
14:00	Diop 24'; Boura 27'; Assoumou 38'; Ifnaoui 53'; El Idrissy 80'		Hatchi 4'; Kielt 84'	Stadium: Stade de l'Aube; Attendance: 5,801; Referee: Mickaël Leleu

23 September 2025 7	Red Star	1–3	Troyes	Saint-Ouen-sur-Seine
20:30	Huard 15'		Monfray (yellow card) 5'; Ifnaoui 25'; Mille 26', (yellow card) 48'; Assoumou 68'; Adeline (yellow card) 70'	Stadium: Stade Bauer; Attendance: 4,713; Referee: Ahmed Taleb

26 September 2025 8	Troyes	3–1	Annecy	Troyes
20:00	El Idrissy 3'; Gozzi (yellow card) 36'; Assoumou 70'; Lemaître (yellow card) 84'; Bentayeb 87'		Kouadio (yellow card) 59'; Tiendrébéogo 90+3'	Stadium: Stade de l'Aube; Attendance: 6,172; Referee: Florent Batta

3 October 2025 9	Le Mans	2–2	Troyes	Le Mans
20:00	Yohou (yellow card) 37'; Harhouz 61'; Calodat 90+2'		Adeline (yellow card) 27'; Gozzi (yellow card) 42'; Lemaître (yellow card) 44'; Bentayeb 73', 75'	Stadium: Stade Marie-Marvingt; Attendance: 6,500; Referee: Stéphanie Frappart

17 October 2025 10	Troyes	1–0	Bastia	Troyes
20:00	Adeline (red card) 23'; Mille (yellow card) 27'; Bentayeb 40'; Diop (yellow card) 48'; Titi (yellow card) 60'; Monfray (yellow card) 82'		Ariss (yellow card) 48'; Guevara (yellow card) 53'; Guidi (yellow card) 79'	Stadium: Stade de l'Aube; Attendance: 6,405; Referee: Geoffrey Kubler

24 October 2025 11	Reims	0–0	Troyes	Reims
20:00	Ibrahim (yellow card) 64'		Detourbet (yellow card) 33'; Assoumou (yellow card) 60'	Stadium: Stade Auguste-Delaune; Attendance: 14,880; Referee: Pierre Gaillouste

28 October 2025 12	Troyes	3–1	Amiens	Troyes
21:30	Maronnier (yellow card) 34'; Bentayeb 48' (pen.), 53', (yellow card) 49'; Ripart (yellow card) 56'; El Idrissy 89'		Dimi 30'; Chabane (yellow card) 55'; Monconduit (yellow card) 87'	Stadium: Stade de l'Aube; Attendance: 6,878; Referee: Tifenn Leprodhomme

3 November 2025 13	Pau	1–1	Troyes	Pau
20:45	Messi 33'; Meddah (yellow card) 43'; Dong (yellow card) 64'		Bentayeb (red card) 17'; El Idrissy (yellow card) 24'; Diop 62'	Stadium: Nouste Camp; Attendance: 3,391; Referee: Aurélien Petit

8 November 2025 14	Troyes	2–3	Saint-Étienne	Troyes
20:00	Gozzi (yellow card) 44'; Diop 61'; El Idrissy (yellow card) 62'; Ripart 86'; Monfray (yellow card) 90'		Boakye 11', (yellow card) 50'; Cardona 32'; Duffus 45+3'	Stadium: Stade de l'Aube; Attendance: 13,216; Referee: Mathieu Vernice

21 November 2025 15	Laval	0–1	Troyes	Laval
20:00	Camara (yellow card) 26'; Samassa (yellow card) 48'; Mandouki (yellow card) 68'; Tchokounté (yellow card) 89'		Monfray (yellow card) 26'; Adeline 48'; Konaté (yellow card) 86'; Mille (yellow card) 90+3'	Stadium: Stade Francis Le Basser; Attendance: 4,958; Referee: Karim Abed

6 December 2025 16	Troyes	1–1	Rodez	Troyes
14:00	Gambor (yellow card) 36'; Ripart 51'; Monfray (yellow card) 64'		Joly 62'; Benchamma (yellow card) 86'	Stadium: Stade de l'Aube; Attendance: 6,247; Referee: Mickaël Leleu

15 December 2025 17	Boulogne	1–2	Troyes	Boulogne
20:45	Monfray 22' (o.g.); Burlet (yellow card) 65'; Boula (penalty missed) 86'		Mille 9'; Hamdi (yellow card) 56'; Maronnier (yellow card) 63' (red card) 83'; Monfray (yellow card) 73'; Ripart 90+4'	Stadium: Stade de la Libération; Attendance: 4,232; Referee: Brendan Roffet

3 January 2026 18	Troyes	1–0	Red Star	Troyes
14:00	Maronnier (yellow card) 36'; Bentayeb 43'		Khaoui (yellow card) 58'; Poussin (yellow card) 90+4'; Danger (yellow card) 90+4'	Stadium: Stade de l'Aube; Attendance: 6,813; Referee: Geoffrey Kubler

17 January 2026 19	Troyes	2–1	Reims	Troyes
14:00	Detourbet 14'; Mille (yellow card) 36'; Diop (red card) 42'; Ifnaoui 45+3'; Boura (yellow card) 71'		Jaouen (yellow card) 15'; Busi (yellow card) 22'; Diarra (yellow card) 40'; Nakamura 90+4'	Stadium: Stade de l'Aube; Attendance: 11,909; Referee: Antoine Valnet

24 January 2026 20	Guingamp	1–0	Troyes	Guingamp
14:00	Gomis (yellow card) 32'; Samoura 68'; Mafouta (yellow card) 89'; Mbemba (yellow card) 90+7' (red card) 90+7'		Boura (yellow card) 18'; Ouzenadji (yellow card) 52'; Gambor (yellow card) 72'; Monfray (yellow card) 84'; Ifnaoui (yellow card) 90+7'	Stadium: Stade Municipal de Roudourou; Attendance: 7,631; Referee: Alexandre Perreau Niel

31 January 2026 21	Troyes	0–2	Le Mans	Troyes
14:00	Chavalerin (yellow card) 59'; Detourbet (yellow card) 90+4'; El Idrissy (yellow card) 90+4'		Yohou (yellow card) 8'; Colas 34'; Voyer 45+2'; Hamdi (red card) 54'; Rossignol (yellow card) 56'; Kocik (yellow card) 83'; Lauray (yellow card) 90+4'; Ribelin (yellow card) 90+4'	Stadium: Stade de l'Aube; Attendance: 6,620; Referee: Abdelatif Kherradji

7 February 2026 22	Nancy	2–1	Troyes	Nancy
14:00	Evans (yellow card) 5'; Bourgault 8'; Dabasse (yellow card) 54', (goal) 69' (pen.); Barbier (yellow card) 65'		Bentayeb 31'; Ouzenadji (yellow card) 45+1'; Detourbet (yellow card) 65'	Stadium: Stade Marcel Picot; Attendance: 9,270; Referee: Pierre Gaillouste

16 February 2026 23	Bastia	0–0	Troyes	Furiani
20:45	Guevara (yellow card) 44'; Merghem (yellow card) 88'		Monfray (yellow card) 7'; Titi (yellow card) 15'; Gambor (yellow card) 48'; Mille (yellow card) 74'	Stadium: Stade Armand-Cesari; Attendance: 10,158; Referee: Ruddy Buquet

21 February 2026 24	Troyes	4–3	Pau	Troyes
14:00	Mille (yellow card) 28'; Diawara (yellow card) 37'; Bentayeb 43' (pen.), 90', (yellow card) 90+1'; Detourbet 44'; Adeline 77'; Ouzenadji (yellow card) 78'		Fall 16'; Versini 21'; Briançon (yellow card) 36'; Kalulu 61'; Raveyre (yellow card) 82'; Ruiz (yellow card) 84'	Stadium: Stade de l'Aube; Attendance: 6,091; Referee: Alexandre Perreau Niel

2 March 2026 25	Amiens	0–2	Troyes	Amiens
20:45	Kaïboué (yellow card) 50'		Diawara 52'; Bentayeb 60'; Gambor (yellow card) 79'	Stadium: Stade de la Licorne; Attendance: 6,350; Referee: Eddy Rosier

7 March 2026 26	Troyes	2–1	Clermont	Troyes
14:00	S. Diawara (yellow card) 57'; K. Diawara 78'; Adeline 81'		Ackra (yellow card) 43'; Bamba 51'; Baallal (yellow card) 73'	Stadium: Stade de l'Aube; Attendance: 8,417; Referee: Aurélien Petit

16 March 2026 27	Annecy	1–2	Troyes	Annecy
21:45	Larose (yellow card) 14'; Rowe (yellow card) 28'; Dion 41'; Drouhin (yellow card) 86'; Jacob (yellow card) 90+4' (red card) 90+8'		Ouzenadji 54'; Maronnier (yellow card) 57'; Ripart 85'	Stadium: Parc des Sports; Attendance: 5,786; Referee: Brendan Roffet

21 March 2026 28	Troyes	5–1	Dunkerque	Troyes
15:00	Adeline 1'; Bentayeb 45' (pen.), 75'; Ripart 87'; El Idrissy 90+4'		Bokele 21'; Zossou (red card) 24'; Diong (yellow card) 43'; Kanté (yellow card) 77'	Stadium: Stade de l'Aube; Attendance: 7,418; Referee: Ahmed Taleb

4 April 2026 29	Montpellier	2–2	Troyes	Montpellier
14:00	Chennahi 4'; Everson Junior (yellow card) 40'; Mendy 45+2', (penalty missed) 45+2', (yellow card) 77'		Adeline 3'; S. Diawara (yellow card) 45+1'; Bentayeb 61'; Maronnier (yellow card) 78'	Stadium: Stade de la Mosson; Attendance: 9,932; Referee: Mickaël Leleu

13 April 2026 30	Rodez	2–1	Troyes	Rodez
20:45	Evans (yellow card) 41'; Maronnier 54' (o.g.); Arconte 72'; Jolibois (yellow card) 90+5'		Adeline 3', (yellow card) 10'; Ripart (yellow card) 82'; El Idrissy (yellow card) 89' (red card) 89'	Stadium: Stade Paul-Lignon; Attendance: 6,565; Referee: Guillaume Paradis
