= List of French football transfers winter 2025–26 =

This is a list of French football transfers for the 2025–26 winter transfer window. Only transfers featuring Ligue 1 and Ligue 2 are listed.

== Ligue 1 ==
Note: Flags indicate national team as has been defined under FIFA eligibility rules. Players may hold more than one non-FIFA nationality.

=== Lens ===
In:

No.	Pos.	Nation	Player
9	MF	FRA	Allan Saint-Maximin (from (Mexico) Club América)
16	GK	FRA	Mathieu Gorgelin (Free Agent)
17	MF	MLI	Amadou Haidara (from (Germany) RB Leipzig)
27	DF	COD	Arthur Masuaku (on loan from (England) Sunderland)

Out:

No.	Pos.	Nation	Player
13	DF	ECU	Jhoanner Chávez (on loan to (Czech Republic) Sparta Prague)
15	MF	NGA	Hamzat Ojediran (to (United States) Colorado Rapids)
29	FW	GUI	Morgan Guilavogui (to (United States) Real Salt Lake)
—	MF	SWE	Jeremy Agbonifo (on loan to (Sweden) BK Häcken, previously on loan at (Switzerland) Basel)
—	FW	CTA	Goduine Koyalipou (on loan to Angers, previously on loan at (Spain) Levante)
—	FW	URU	Martín Satriano (to Lyon, later loaned to (Spain) Getafe)

=== Paris Saint-Germain ===
In:

No.	Pos.	Nation	Player
27	MF	ESP	Dro Fernández (from (Spain) Barcelona)

Out:

No.	Pos.	Nation	Player
43	DF	FRA	Noham Kamara (on loan to Lyon)
—	DF	FRA	Yoram Zague (on loan to (Belgium) Eupen, previously on loan at (Denmark) Copenhagen)

=== Marseille ===
In:

No.	Pos.	Nation	Player
6	MF	NGA	Tochukwu Nnadi (from (Belgium) Zulte Waregem)
8	MF	ALG	Himad Abdelli (from Angers)
11	MF	ENG	Ethan Nwaneri (on loan from (England) Arsenal)
27	MF	NED	Quinten Timber (from (Netherlands) Feyenoord)

Out:

No.	Pos.	Nation	Player
6	DF	SUI	Ulisses Garcia (on loan to (Italy) Sassuolo)
7	FW	FRA	Neal Maupay (on loan to (Spain) Sevilla)
8	MF	ENG	Angel Gomes (on loan to (England) Wolverhampton Wanderers)
17	MF	DEN	Matt O'Riley (loan return to (England) Brighton & Hove Albion)
28	MF	CMR	François Mughe (to (Cyprus) AEL Limassol)
29	DF	ESP	Pol Lirola (to (Italy) Hellas Verona)
34	FW	FRA	Robinio Vaz (to (Italy) Roma)
36	GK	ESP	Rubén Blanco (released)
48	FW	FRA	Keyliane Abdallah (on loan to (Spain) Gimnàstic Tarragona)
50	MF	FRA	Darryl Bakola (to (Italy) Sassuolo)
62	DF	PAN	Michael Amir Murillo (to (Turkey) Beşiktaş)
—	MF	CAN	Ismaël Koné (to (Italy) Sassuolo, previously on loan)

=== Lille ===
In:

No.	Pos.	Nation	Player
20	FW	FRA	Noah Edjouma (from Toulouse)
28	MF	FRA	Gaëtan Perrin (from (Russia) Krasnodar)

Out:

No.	Pos.	Nation	Player
26	MF	POR	André Gomes (to (United States) Columbus Crew)
28	MF	FRA	Ugo Raghouber (on loan to (Spain) Levante)
43	FW	FRA	Trévis Dago (to Laval)
—	MF	FRA	Aaron Malouda (to (Azerbaijan) Sabah, previously on loan)
—	MF	ARG	Ignacio Miramón (on loan to (Argentina) Gimnasia LP, previously on loan at (Argentina) Boca Juniors)

=== Lyon ===
In:

No.	Pos.	Nation	Player
9	FW	BRA	Endrick (on loan from (Spain) Real Madrid)
20	FW	URU	Martín Satriano (from Lens, previously on loan)
77	FW	UKR	Roman Yaremchuk (on loan from (Greece) Olympiacos)
85	DF	FRA	Noham Kamara (on loan from Paris Saint-Germain)
99	MF	DEN	Noah Nartey (from (Denmark) Brøndby)

Out:

No.	Pos.	Nation	Player
20	FW	URU	Martín Satriano (on loan to (Spain) Getafe)
29	FW	FRA	Enzo Molebe (on loan to Montpellier)
32	FW	ENG	Alejandro Gomes Rodríguez (on loan to Annecy)
41	DF	CRO	Teo Barišić (to (Croatia) Rijeka)
—	DF	FRA	Saël Kumbedi (to (Germany) VfL Wolfsburg, previously on loan)

=== Rennes ===
In:

No.	Pos.	Nation	Player
17	MF	POL	Sebastian Szymański (from (Turkey) Fenerbahçe)
70	FW	FRA	Arnaud Nordin (on loan from (Germany) Mainz 05)
77	FW	MAR	Yassir Zabiri (from (Portugal) Famalicão)

Out:

No.	Pos.	Nation	Player
8	MF	CIV	Seko Fofana (on loan to (Portugal) Porto)
23	GK	FRA	Gauthier Gallon (to (Belgium) Dender)
39	FW	CIV	Mohamed Kader Meïté (to (Saudi Arabia) Al Hilal)
—	DF	COM	Warmed Omari (to (Germany) Hamburger SV, previously on loan)
—	DF	NOR	Leo Østigård (to (Italy) Genoa, previously on loan)
—	MF	COL	Andrés Gómez (to (Brazil) Vasco da Gama, previously on loan)
—	MF	DEN	Albert Grønbæk (on loan to (Germany) Hamburger SV, previously on loan at (Italy) Genoa)

=== Strasbourg ===
In:

No.	Pos.	Nation	Player
5	DF	ARG	Aarón Anselmino (on loan from (England) Chelsea, previously on loan at (Germany) Borussia Dortmund)
15	FW	CIV	David Datro Fofana (on loan from (England) Chelsea, previously on loan at (Turkey) Fatih Karagümrük)
18	DF	FRA	Junior Mwanga (loan return from Nantes)
25	MF	MAR	Gessime Yassine (from Dunkerque)
—	MF	SEN	Pape Demba Diop (loan return from (Germany) 1. FC Nürnberg)

Out:

No.	Pos.	Nation	Player
5	DF	CIV	Abakar Sylla (on loan to Nantes)
16	MF	ECU	Kendry Páez (loan return to (England) Chelsea, later loaned to (Argentina) River Plate)
23	DF	SEN	Mamadou Sarr (loan return to (England) Chelsea)
41	MF	FRA	Rabby Nzingoula (on loan to (Germany) 1. FC Nürnberg)
77	DF	UKR	Eduard Sobol (released)
80	MF	FRA	Félix Lemaréchal (to (Belgium) Club Brugge)
—	DF	GUI	Saïdou Sow (on loan to Clermont)
—	MF	SEN	Pape Demba Diop (on loan to Toulouse)
—	MF	FRA	Rayane Messi (on loan to (Saudi Arabia) Neom, previously on loan at Pau)
—	FW	SRB	Miloš Luković (on loan to (England) Preston North End, previously on loan at (Spain) Las Palmas)

=== Toulouse ===
In:

No.	Pos.	Nation	Player
13	FW	CAN	Jacen Russell-Rowe (from (United States) Columbus Crew)
—	MF	SEN	Pape Demba Diop (on loan from Strasbourg)

Out:

No.	Pos.	Nation	Player
20	MF	GER	Niklas Schmidt (on loan to (Germany) Darmstadt 98)
31	FW	FRA	Noah Edjouma (to Lille)
—	FW	BIH	Said Hamulić (Released, previously on loan at (Greece) Volos)

=== Monaco ===
In:

No.	Pos.	Nation	Player
24	MF	CIV	Simon Adingra (on loan from (England) Sunderland)
25	DF	BEL	Wout Faes (on loan from (England) Leicester City)

Out:

No.	Pos.	Nation	Player
19	FW	NGA	George Ilenikhena (to (Saudi Arabia) Al-Ittihad)
21	MF	FRA	Lucas Michal (on loan to Metz)

=== Angers ===
In:

No.	Pos.	Nation	Player
8	MF	NED	Branco van den Boomen (on loan from (Netherlands) Ajax)
9	FW	CTA	Goduine Koyalipou (on loan from Lens, previously on loan at (Spain) Levante)

Out:

No.	Pos.	Nation	Player
10	MF	ALG	Himad Abdelli (to Marseille)
11	FW	FRA	Sidiki Cherif (on loan to (Turkey) Fenerbahçe)
17	MF	FRA	Justin Kalumba (to (Spain) RCD Mallorca)
18	MF	GAB	Jim Allevinah (on loan to (Turkey) Kasımpaşa)

=== Brest ===
In:

No.	Pos.	Nation	Player

Out:

No.	Pos.	Nation	Player
25	DF	FRA	Julien Le Cardinal (to Saint-Étienne)

=== Lorient ===
In:

No.	Pos.	Nation	Player

Out:

No.	Pos.	Nation	Player
93	MF	NOR	Joel Mvuka (on loan to (Scotland) Celtic)
—	DF	IRL	Ade Solanke (to (England) Bournemouth)

=== Le Havre ===
In:

No.	Pos.	Nation	Player
17	MF	MAR	Sofiane Boufal (from (Belgium) Union SG)
19	MF	FRA	Lucas Gourna-Douath (on loan from (Austria) Red Bull Salzburg)
32	DF	FRA	Timothée Pembélé (on loan from (England) Sunderland)

Out:

No.	Pos.	Nation	Player
9	FW	CHI	Damián Pizarro (loan return to (Italy) Udinese)
10	MF	DEN	Younes Namli (to (Netherlands) PEC Zwolle)
19	FW	FRA	Élysée Logbo (on loan to Bourg-Péronnas)
23	DF	FRA	Thomas Delaine (released)

=== Nice ===
In:

No.	Pos.	Nation	Player
11	FW	FRA	Elye Wahi (on loan from (Germany) Eintracht Frankfurt)

Out:

No.	Pos.	Nation	Player
7	MF	CIV	Jérémie Boga (on loan to (Italy) Juventus)
9	FW	NGA	Terem Moffi (on loan to (Portugal) Porto)
49	FW	CMR	Bernard Nguene (to (Belgium) Standard Liège, previously on loan)
—	DF	ITA	Mattia Viti (on loan to (Italy) Sampdoria, previously on loan at (Italy) Fiorentina)
—	FW	NGA	Victor Orakpo (on loan to Nancy, previously on loan at Montpellier)

=== Paris FC ===
In:

No.	Pos.	Nation	Player
18	MF	ZIM	Marshall Munetsi (on loan from (England) Wolverhampton Wanderers)
23	MF	FRA	Rudy Matondo (from Auxerre)
24	MF	ITA	Luca Koleosho (on loan from (England) Burnley)
36	FW	ITA	Ciro Immobile (from (Italy) Bologna)
42	DF	ITA	Diego Coppola (on loan from (England) Brighton & Hove Albion)

Out:

No.	Pos.	Nation	Player
8	MF	BFA	Lohann Doucet (on loan to Dunkerque)
12	MF	MLI	Nouha Dicko (released)
—	DF	FRA	Yoan Koré (on loan to Amiens, previously on loan at (Spain) Betis Deportivo)
—	DF	MAR	Mathys Tourraine (on loan to Clermont, previously on loan at Rodez)

=== Nantes ===
In:

No.	Pos.	Nation	Player
2	DF	LBY	Ali Youssif (from (Tunisia) Club Africain)
4	DF	CIV	Abakar Sylla (on loan from Strasbourg)
20	MF	FRA	Rémy Cabella (on loan from (Greece) Olympiacos)
21	MF	FRA	Mohamed Kaba (on loan from (Italy) Lecce)
24	DF	FRA	Frédéric Guilbert (from (Italy) Lecce)
28	MF	MLI	Ibrahima Sissoko (from (Germany) VfL Bochum)
37	FW	CMR	Ignatius Ganago (loan return from (United States) New England Revolution)

Out:

No.	Pos.	Nation	Player
5	MF	KOR	Kwon Hyeok-kyu (to (Germany) Karlsruher SC)
7	MF	KOR	Hong Hyun-seok (loan return to (Germany) Mainz 05)
15	MF	SWE	Mayckel Lahdo (loan return to (Netherlands) AZ, later loaned to (Denmark) Brøndby)
80	DF	FRA	Junior Mwanga (loan return to Strasbourg)
90	MF	FRA	Yassine Benhattab (on loan to Reims)

=== Auxerre ===
In:

No.	Pos.	Nation	Player
8	MF	FRA	Naouirou Ahamada (from (England) Crystal Palace)
24	DF	SUI	Bryan Okoh (from (Switzerland) Lausanne-Sport)
28	MF	FRA	Romain Faivre (on loan from (England) Bournemouth, previously on loan at (Saudi Arabia) Al Taawoun)

Out:

No.	Pos.	Nation	Player
23	MF	GHA	Ibrahim Osman (loan return to (England) Brighton & Hove Albion, later loaned to (England) Birmingham City)
34	MF	FRA	Rudy Matondo (to Paris FC)

=== Metz ===
In:

No.	Pos.	Nation	Player
11	FW	GEO	Giorgi Kvilitaia (from (Cyprus) Aris Limassol)
19	MF	FRA	Lucas Michal (on loan from Monaco)
70	DF	SEN	Bouna Sarr (Free Agent)

Out:

No.	Pos.	Nation	Player
11	FW	SEN	Malick Mbaye (to (Belgium) Zulte Waregem)
14	MF	SEN	Cheikh Sabaly (to (United States) Vancouver Whitecaps)
19	MF	CMR	Morgan Bokele (on loan to Dunkerque)
23	FW	SEN	Ibou Sané (on loan to Amiens)
24	FW	ENG	Brian Madjo (to (England) Aston Villa)

== Ligue 2 ==
Note: Flags indicate national team as has been defined under FIFA eligibility rules. Players may hold more than one non-FIFA nationality.

=== Troyes ===
In:

No.	Pos.	Nation	Player
29	MF	GUI	Kandet Diawara (from (Germany) 1. FC Magdeburg)

Out:

No.	Pos.	Nation	Player
15	FW	CIV	Jaurès Assoumou (to (Turkey) Samsunspor)
22	DF	FRA	Mathis Hamdi (to Le Mans)
—	DF	ECU	Jackson Porozo (to (Mexico) Tijuana, previously on loan)

=== Reims ===
In:

No.	Pos.	Nation	Player
22	DF	CMR	Samuel Kotto (on loan from (Belgium) Gent)
90	MF	FRA	Yassine Benhattab (on loan from Nantes)
92	DF	FRA	Abdoul Koné (on loan from (Germany) RB Leipzig)

Out:

No.	Pos.	Nation	Player
7	MF	FRA	Antoine Leautey (on loan to Amiens)
10	MF	MLT	Teddy Teuma (to (Belgium) Standard Liège)
11	FW	FRA	Amine Salama (on loan to (Netherlands) NAC Breda)
23	MF	FRA	Yohan Demoncy (on loan to Guingamp)
77	FW	BEL	Norman Bassette (loan return to (England) Coventry City)
92	DF	FRA	Abdoul Koné (to (Germany) RB Leipzig)
—	FW	MLI	Niama Pape Sissoko (on loan to Nancy)

=== Red Star ===
In:

No.	Pos.	Nation	Player
2	DF	SUI	Théo Magnin (from (Switzerland) Servette)
4	MF	FRA	Balthazar Pierret (from (Italy) Lecce)
9	FW	SEN	Pape Meïssa Ba (on loan from (Poland) Widzew Łódź)
40	GK	TUN	Mouez Hassen (from (Tunisia) Club Africain)

Out:

No.	Pos.	Nation	Player
4	DF	FRA	Joachim Kayi Sanda (loan return to (England) Southampton)
8	MF	FRA	Joachim Eickmayer (to Bastia)
17	MF	MTQ	Samuel Renel (on loan to Rouen)
30	GK	FRA	Valentin Rabouille (released)

=== Saint-Étienne ===
In:

No.	Pos.	Nation	Player
14	MF	CIV	Abdoulaye Kanté (on loan from (England) Middlesbrough)
18	DF	FRA	Aboubaka Soumahoro (on loan from (Germany) Hamburger SV)
26	DF	FRA	Julien Le Cardinal (from Brest)
49	FW	EST	Marten Paalberg (from (Estonia) Vaprus)

Out:

No.	Pos.	Nation	Player
4	MF	FRA	Pierre Ekwah (on loan to (England) Watford)
21	DF	COD	Dylan Batubinsika (to (Greece) AEL)
27	DF	GLP	Yvann Maçon (to (Greece) Larissa)

=== Le Mans ===
In:

No.	Pos.	Nation	Player
11	MF	FRA	Adil Bourabaa (from Beauvais)
26	DF	FRA	Mathis Hamdi (from Troyes)
29	MF	FRA	Lucas Bretelle (from (Belgium) La Louvière)

Out:

No.	Pos.	Nation	Player
11	DF	FRA	Leroy Abanda (to (Greece) OFI)
26	DF	FRA	Brice Oggard (to Cannes)

=== Dunkerque ===
In:

No.	Pos.	Nation	Player
4	DF	BEL	Bram Lagae (from (Belgium) Gent)
15	MF	FRA	Lohann Doucet (on loan from Paris FC)
42	DF	FRA	Maedine Makhloufi (from Saint-Étienne B)
69	MF	CMR	Morgan Bokele (on loan from Metz)

Out:

No.	Pos.	Nation	Player
21	DF	FRA	Geoffrey Kondo (to (Belgium) Cercle Brugge)
80	MF	MAR	Gessime Yassine (to Strasbourg)

=== Pau ===
In:

No.	Pos.	Nation	Player

Out:

No.	Pos.	Nation	Player
7	MF	FRA	Rayane Messi (loan return to Strasbourg, later loaned to (Saudi Arabia) Neom)

=== Guingamp ===
In:

No.	Pos.	Nation	Player
19	FW	FRA	Amadou Samoura (from Concarneau)
21	MF	FRA	Yohan Demoncy (on loan from Reims)

Out:

No.	Pos.	Nation	Player
23	DF	FRA	Dylan Ourega (to (Belgium) Westerlo)
—	FW	NGA	Brown Irabor (to (Slovenia) Koper, previously on loan at Le Puy Foot 43)

=== Montpellier ===
In:

No.	Pos.	Nation	Player
14	FW	FRA	Enzo Molebe (on loan from Lyon)
20	MF	FRA	Nabil Homssa (from Châteaubriant)

Out:

No.	Pos.	Nation	Player
14	FW	NGA	Victor Orakpo (loan return to Nice, later loaned to Nancy)
27	DF	SUI	Bećir Omeragić (to (Switzerland) Basel)

=== Annecy ===
In:

No.	Pos.	Nation	Player
7	MF	FRA	Valentin Jacob (free agent)
11	FW	ENG	Alejandro Gomes Rodríguez (on loan from Lyon)
20	DF	ENG	Travis Patterson (on loan from (England) Aston Villa)
24	MF	FRA	Nolan Ferro (from Strasbourg B)
80	FW	CIV	Moïse Sahi Dion (from (Belgium) Dender)
—	FW	FRA	Alan Mondesir (from Montlouis)

Out:

No.	Pos.	Nation	Player
10	MF	FRA	Mayssam Benama (to (Spain) Valencia Mestalla)
11	MF	SUI	Ranjan Neelakandan (on loan to (Switzerland) Yverdon-Sport)
20	MF	BFA	Josué Tiendrébéogo (to (Serbia) IMT)
—	FW	FRA	Alan Mondesir (on loan to Montlouis)

=== Clermont ===
In:

No.	Pos.	Nation	Player
4	DF	GUI	Saïdou Sow (on loan from Strasbourg)
19	FW	MLI	Mohamed Guindo (on loan from (Belgium) La Louvière)
39	DF	MAR	Mathys Tourraine (on loan from Paris FC, previously on loan at Rodez)

Out:

No.	Pos.	Nation	Player
15	DF	MLI	Cheick Oumar Konaté (on loan to (Greece) A.E. Kifisia)

=== Rodez ===
In:

No.	Pos.	Nation	Player

Out:

No.	Pos.	Nation	Player
14	DF	MAR	Mathys Tourraine (loaned return to Paris FC, later loaned to Clermont)
17	DF	FRA	Aurélien Pelon (on loan to Saint-Pryvé)
29	MF	FRA	Flavien Tait (released)

=== Grenoble ===
In:

No.	Pos.	Nation	Player
6	MF	FRA	Lucas Bernadou (Free Agent)
12	FW	FRA	Ugo Bonnet (from (Serbia) IMT)

Out:

No.	Pos.	Nation	Player
9	MF	FRA	Alan Kerouedan (on loan to Rouen)
23	FW	FRA	Nesta Elphege (to (Italy) Parma)
25	MF	FRA	Théo Valls (released)
28	MF	FRA	Hianga'a Mbock (to (Hungary) Kisvárda)
33	DF	TUR	Efe Sarıkaya (on loan to (Turkey) Çorum)
—	FW	MAR	Ayoub Jabbari (to (United States) FC Cincinnati, previously on loan)

=== Nancy ===
In:

No.	Pos.	Nation	Player
9	FW	MLI	Niama Pape Sissoko (on loan from Reims)
24	FW	NGA	Victor Orakpo (on loan from Nice, previously on loan at Montpellier)

Out:

No.	Pos.	Nation	Player

=== Amiens ===
In:

No.	Pos.	Nation	Player
14	MF	FRA	Antoine Leautey (on loan from Reims)
21	DF	GLP	Jérôme Roussillon (from (England) Charlton Athletic)
29	FW	SEN	Ibou Sané (on loan from Metz)
80	MF	FRA	Skelly Alvero (on loan from (Germany) Werder Bremen)
88	DF	FRA	Yoan Koré (on loan from Paris FC, previously on loan at (Spain) Betis Deportivo)
90	FW	FRA	Samuel Ntamack (on loan from (Spain) Huesca)

Out:

No.	Pos.	Nation	Player
26	FW	FRA	Yvan Ikia Dimi (to (Poland) Górnik Zabrze)
94	FW	FRA	Mathis Touho (to Villefranche)

=== Boulogne ===
In:

No.	Pos.	Nation	Player
97	DF	GLP	Zoran Moco (from Dijon FCO)
99	GK	CMR	Blondy Nna Noukeu (from (England) Sunderland)
—	DF	FRA	Antoine Kerriou (from Les Herbiers)

Out:

No.	Pos.	Nation	Player
8	MF	FRA	Lilian Ralliot (on loan to Paris 13 Atletico)
20	DF	CIV	Hervé Touré (on loan to (Serbia) Javor Matis)
27	FW	FRA	Exaucé Mpembele Boula (on loan to Paris 13 Atletico)
29	FW	FRA	Christian Kitenge (on loan to Saint-Malo)
—	DF	FRA	Antoine Kerriou (on loan to Les Herbiers)

=== Laval ===
In:

No.	Pos.	Nation	Player
7	DF	CIV	Owen Kouassi (on loan from (Italy) Lecce)
11	FW	FRA	Trévis Dago (from Lille)
15	MF	BEL	Dylan Mbayo (on loan from (Netherlands) PEC Zwolle)
24	DF	SEN	Sidi Bane (Free Agent)

Out:

No.	Pos.	Nation	Player
2	DF	FRA	Théo Pellenard (to (China) Meizhou Hakka)
22	FW	FRA	Noa Mupemba (on loan to Châteauroux)
27	FW	FRA	Aymeric Faurand-Tournaire (on loan to La Roche)
—	DF	CIV	Ange Badey (to Versailles, previously on loan at Aviron Bayonnais)

=== Bastia ===
In:

No.	Pos.	Nation	Player
17	MF	FRA	Joachim Eickmayer (from Red Star)
29	MF	ALG	Mehdi Merghem (from (Algeria) JS Kabylie)

Out:

No.	Pos.	Nation	Player
29	MF	CMR	Loïc Etoga (Released)

== See also ==
- 2025–26 Ligue 1
- 2025–26 Ligue 2
