= 2024–25 ES Troyes AC season =

ES Troyes AC
2024–25 season
- Manager: Stéphane Dumont
- Stadium: Stade de l'Aube
- Ligue 2: 10th
- Coupe de France: Round of 16
- Top goalscorer: League: Rafiki Saïd (8); All: Rafiki Saïd (9)

The 2024–25 season was the 39th season in the history of Espérance Sportive Troyes Aube Champagne, and the club's second consecutive season in Ligue 2. Additionally, Troyes is competing in the Coupe de France.

== Transfers ==
=== In ===
Pos.	Player	Transferred from	Fee	Date	Source
DF	(Ivory Coast) Junior Diaz	(France) Nantes	€2,500,000	8 August 2024	
MF	(France) Cyriaque Irié	(France) Dijon FCO B	€3,000,000	15 August 2024	
DF	(Guinea-Bissau) Houboulang Mendes	(Spain) Almería	Loan	27 August 2024	
DF	(Italy) Paolo Gozzi	(Italy) Genoa	Undisclosed	30 August 2024	
MF	(France) Martin Adeline	(France) Reims	Undisclosed	30 August 2024	
MF	(Belgium) Joseph Nonge	(Italy) Juventus Next Gen	Loan	30 August 2024	

=== Out ===
Pos.	Player	Transferred to	Fee	Date	Source
FW	(Sweden) Amar Fatah	(Netherlands) Willem II Tilburg	Loan	26 August 2024	
DF	(France) Rudy Kohon	(Spain) Betis Deportivo	Undisclosed	27 August 2024	
MF	(Benin) Junior Olaitan	(France) Grenoble Foot 38	Undisclosed	30 August 2024	
FW	(Algeria) Noa Cervantes	(France) Châteauroux	Loan	30 August 2024	
MF	(Denmark) Andreas Bruus	(Denmark) Aalborg BK	Loan	2 September 2024	
DF	(France) Eric N'jo	(Belgium) Royal Excelsior Virton	Undisclosed	5 September 2024	

== Competitions ==
=== Overall record ===
Competition	First match	Last match	Starting round	Record							
Competition	First match	Last match	Starting round	Pld	W	D	L	GF	GA	GD	Win %
Ligue 2	16 August 2024	10 May 2025	Matchday 1	17	6	3	8	16	19	−3	35.29
Coupe de France	16 November 2024		Seventh round	3	3	0	0	7	1	+6	100.00
Total				20	9	3	8	23	20	+3	45.00

Last updated: 3 January 2025
Source: Competitions

=== Ligue 2 ===
==== League table ====
Pos	Team	Pld	W	D	L	GF	GA	GD	Pts	Promotion or Relegation
8	Bastia	34	11	15	8	43	37	+6	48	
9	Grenoble	34	13	7	14	43	44	−1	46	
10	Troyes	34	13	5	16	36	34	+2	44	
11	Amiens	34	13	4	17	38	50	−12	43	
12	Ajaccio (Note: Ajaccio were relegated due to financial reasons.) (D, R)	34	12	6	16	30	42	−12	42	Administrative relegation to Régional 2

Source: Ligue 2
Rules for classification: 1) Points; 2) Goal difference; 3) Number of goals scored; 4) Head-to-head goal difference; 5) Fair play points
(D) Disqualified; (R) Relegated

==== Results summary ====
Overall								Home						Away					
Pld	W	D	L	GF	GA	GD	Pts	W	D	L	GF	GA	GD	W	D	L	GF	GA	GD
0	0	0	0	0	0	0	0	0	0	0	0	0	0	0	0	0	0	0	0

Last updated: 13 December 2024.

==== Results by round ====
Round	1
Ground	
Result	
Position	

Updated to match(es) played on 13 December 2024. Source:
A = Away; H = Home; W = Win; D = Draw; L = Loss

==== Matches ====
16 August 2024 1	Guingamp	4–0	Troyes	Guingamp

23 August 2024 2	Troyes	0–1	Clermont	Troyes
				Stadium: Stade de l'Aube

30 August 2024 3	Ajaccio	2–1	Troyes	Ajaccio

13 September 2024 4	Bastia	0–0	Troyes	Furiani

20 September 2024 5	Troyes	0–3	Rodez	Troyes
				Stadium: Stade de l'Aube

24 September 2024 6	Annecy	1–0	Troyes	Annecy

28 September 2024 7	Troyes	2–1	Metz	Troyes
				Stadium: Stade de l'Aube

4 October 2024 8	Dunkerque	2–1	Troyes	Dunkirk

21 October 2024 9	Troyes	0–3	Paris FC	Troyes
			Kebbal (penalty missed) 58'	Stadium: Stade de l'Aube

26 October 2024 10	Caen	0–1	Troyes	Caen
				Stadium: Stade Michel d'Ornano

29 October 2024 11	Troyes	3–0	Pau	Troyes
	Dong (penalty missed) 90+2'; Ba (penalty missed) 90+5'			Stadium: Stade de l'Aube

1 November 2024 12	Troyes	0–0	Laval	Troyes
				Stadium: Stade de l'Aube

8 November 2024 13	Red Star	0–3	Troyes	Saint-Ouen-sur-Seine
20:00			Ripart 45+1'; Assoumou 89'; Dong 90+3'	Stadium: Stade Bauer

22 November 2024 14	Troyes	0–0	Grenoble	Troyes
				Stadium: Stade de l'Aube

6 December 2024 15	Lorient	2–0	Troyes	Lorient
				Stadium: Stade du Moustoir

13 December 2024 16	Troyes	4–0	Martigues	Troyes
	Irié 20', 72'; Saïd 47'; Adeline 76'			Stadium: Stade de l'Aube

3 January 2025 17	Amiens	0–3	Troyes	Amiens
20:00			Irié 7'; Saïd 45+2'; Ripart 50'	Stadium: Stade de la Licorne

=== Coupe de France ===
16 November 2024 Seventh round	FC Du Foron	1–3	Troyes	Cluses
18:00	Diawara 48' (o.g.)	Report	Adeline 39'; De Préville 69'; Irié 85'	Stadium: Stade Intercommunal; Referee: Antoine Valnet

30 November 2024 Eighth round	Cluses-Scionzier FC	0–1	Troyes	Cluses
17:00		Report	Ba 34'	Stadium: Stade Intercommunal; Referee: Alexandre Perreau Niel

20 December 2024 Round of 64	Troyes	3–0	Metz	Troyes
20:45	Ripart 25', 85'; Irié 71'			Stadium: Stade de l'Aube

15 January 2025 Round of 32	Troyes	v	Rennes	Troyes
18:30				Stadium: Stade de l'Aube
