= Mathys Detourbet =

French footballer (born 2007)

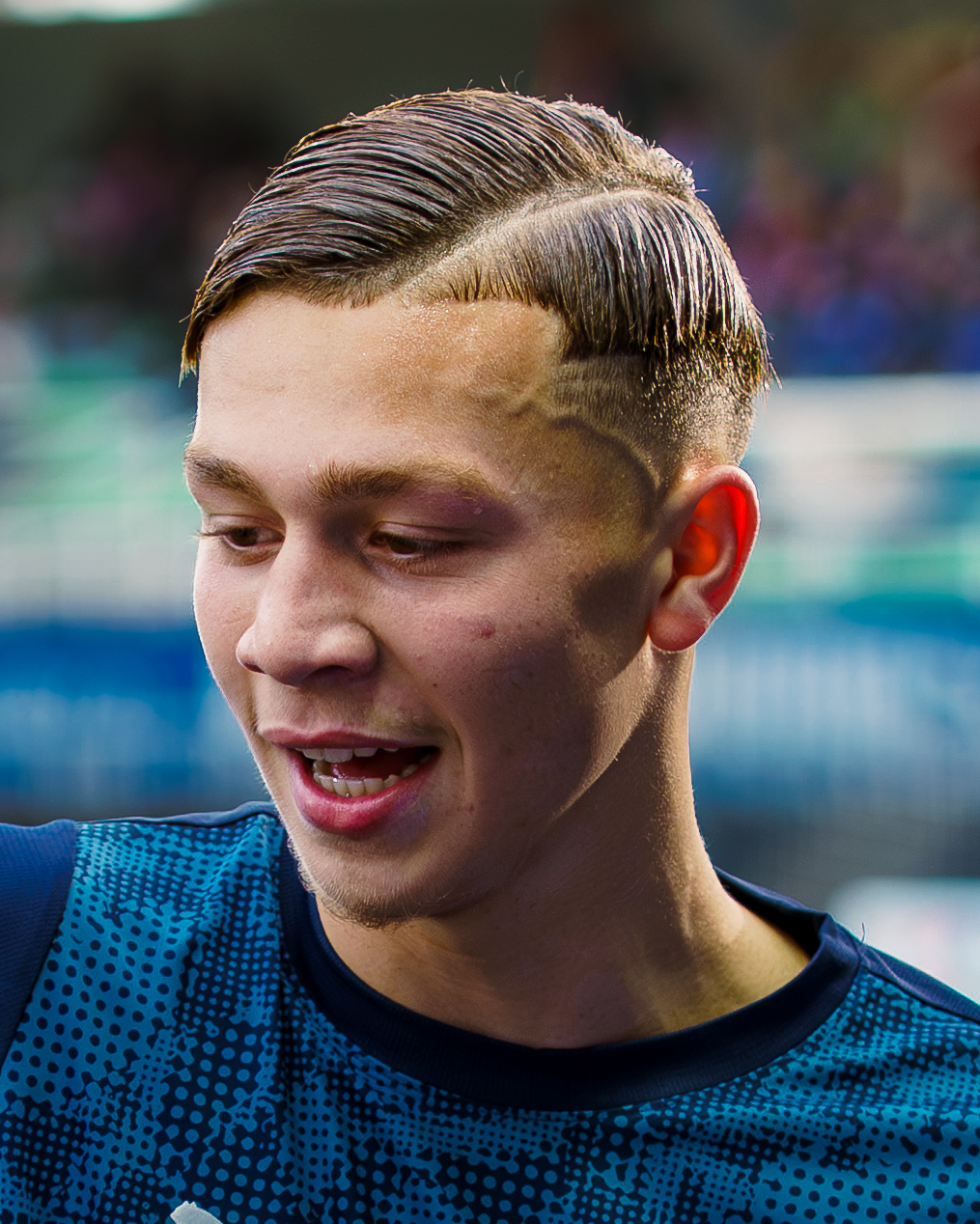
- Mathys Detourbet in 2025

Personal information
- Date of birth: 29 April 2007 (age 19)
- Place of birth: Troyes, France
- Height: 1.78 m (5 ft 10 in)
- Position: Winger

Team information
- Current team: Monaco (on loan from Manchester City)
- Number: 7

Youth career
- 2013–2015: ES Municipaux Troyes
- 2015–2024: Troyes

Senior career*
Years	Team	Apps	(Gls)
2024–2025	Troyes II	12	(7)
2025–2026	Troyes	46	(3)
2026–	Manchester City	0	(0)
2026–	→ Monaco (loan)	5	(0)

International career^{‡}
2024	France U17	2	(0)
2024	France U18	1	(0)
2025–	France U19	8	(4)
2025–	France U20	3	(1)
- * Club domestic league appearances and goals as of 18 October 2026 ‡ National team caps and goals as of 31 March 2026

Mathys Detourbet (born 29 April 2007) is a French professional footballer who plays as a winger for Ligue 1 club Monaco on loan from Premier League club Manchester City.

== Club career ==
A native of Troyes, Detourbet began his football career at local team ES Municipaux Troyes, before moving to the youth academy of the city's professional team ESTAC Troyes.

On 15 January 2025, Detourbet made his professional for Troyes' first team in a 1–0 Coupe de France win against Rennes. On 8 May 2025, Detourbet signed his first professional contract with Troyes, tying him to the team until 2028. Two days after, he started his first game for Troyes in the last matchday of the 2024–25 Ligue 2, contributing in his team's 1–0 against Amiens.

On 2 July 2026, Detourbet joined Monaco on loan.

== International career ==
In May 2025, Detourbet was named in France U21's extended squad for the 2025 UEFA European Under-21 Championship, being one of the two youngest members in the list.

== Career statistics ==
As of match played 18 October 2026

Appearances and goals by club, season and competition
Club	Season	League			National Cup		League Cup		Continental		Other		Total	
Club	Season	Division	Apps	Goals	Apps	Goals	Apps	Goals	Apps	Goals	Apps	Goals	Apps	Goals
Troyes II	2024–25	Championnat National 2	11	6	—		—		—		—		11	6
Troyes II	2025–26	Championnat National 2	1	1	—		—		—		—		1	1
Troyes II	Total		12	7	—		—		—		—		12	7
Troyes	2024–25	Ligue 2	13	0	1	0	—		—		—		14	0
Troyes	2025–26	Ligue 2	33	3	4	1	—		—		—		37	4
Troyes	Total		46	3	5	1	—		—		—		51	4
Manchester City	2026–27	Premier League	0	0	0	0	0	0	0	0	0	0	0	0
Monaco	2026–27	Ligue 1	5	0	0	0	—		2 (Note: Appearances in UEFA Conference League)	0	—		7	0
Career total			63	10	5	1	0	0	2	0	0	0	70	11

== Honours ==
France U20

- Maurice Revello Tournament: 2025
