= Marronnier =

Marronnier may refer to:

- Marronnier (group), South Korean pop group from 1989-1998
- Lucas Maronnier (born 2000), French footballer
