= Tawfik Bentayeb =

Moroccan footballer

Personal information
- Date of birth: 14 January 2002 (age 24)
- Place of birth: Casablanca, Morocco
- Height: 1.80 m (5 ft 11 in)
- Position: Forward

Team information
- Current team: Anderlecht
- Number: 21

Youth career
- 2011–2022: Mohammed VI Academy

Senior career*
Years	Team	Apps	(Gls)
2022–2026	Union Touarga	48	(14)
2024–2025	→ Rodez (loan)	29	(10)
2025–2026	→ Troyes (loan)	28	(18)
2026–	Anderlecht	6	(3)

International career^{‡}
2017–2019	Morocco U17	6	(4)
2021	Morocco U20	4	(0)
2023	Morocco U23	2	(0)
2026–	Morocco	3	(1)
- * Club domestic league appearances and goals as of 19:00, 10 October 2026 (UTC) ‡ National team caps and goals as of 5 October 2026

Tawfik Bentayeb (Arabic: توفيق بن الطيب; born 14 January 2002) is a Moroccan professional footballer who plays as a forward for Belgian Pro League club Anderlecht and the Morocco national team.

After coming through the Mohammed VI Academy, he began his senior career with Union Touarga. He had loans to Rodez and Troyes in France's Ligue 2, winning the title and finishing as top scorer with the latter in 2025–26.

== Club career ==
=== Union Touarga ===
Born in Casablanca, Bentayeb played as a youth for the Mohammed VI Academy. In 2021, it was reported that he was being tracked by Angers, Lorient and Sochaux of France, as well as Raja CA at home. After 11 years at the academy, he joined Union Touarga in the Botola Pro in 2022.

On 22 August 2024, Bentayeb was loaned to Rodez of France's Ligue 2. He played 29 league games and scored 10 goals for the club, including two on 10 March in a 5–1 home win over third-placed Dunkerque.

At the end of August 2025, Bentayeb turned down a €150,000 offer from Guingamp and instead joined fellow Ligue 2 club Troyes on loan for a €300,000 fee. He made his debut on 12 September in a 3–0 home win over AS Nancy Lorraine, scoring twice. He finished the season as top scorer with 18 goals, three ahead of Guingamp's Louis Mafouta, and his team won promotion as champions.

=== Anderlecht ===
On 21 August 2026, Bentayeb signed a four-year contract with Anderlecht in Belgium. He joined for a fee of €4 million and was signed by Antoine Sibierski, who had been sporting director of Troyes the previous season. He made his debut in the Belgian Pro League nine days later as a substitute for the last 12 minutes in a 3–0 loss away to Brussels rivals Union SG. In his fourth game, on 11 September, he scored the only goal away to Mechelen.

== International career ==
Bentayeb went with the Morocco under-17 team to the 2019 U-17 Africa Cup of Nations in Tanzania. He scored in a draw with Senegal and a defeat to Cameroon, in a group stage elimination.

At the 2021 U-20 Africa Cup of Nations in Mauritania, Bentayeb was part of the Morocco team that reached the quarter-finals.

Bentayeb was included in a preliminary Morocco squad for the 2026 FIFA World Cup. He made his debut on 26 May in a 5–0 friendly win at home to Burundi, scoring once and assisting twice.

== Career statistics ==
=== Club ===
As of match played 18 October 2026

Appearances and goals by club, season and competition
Club	Season	League			National cup (Note: Includes Moroccan Throne Cup, Coupe de France, Belgian Cup)		Continental		Total	
Club	Season	Division	Apps	Goals	Apps	Goals	Apps	Goals	Apps	Goals
Union Touarga	2021–22	Botola Pro	0	0	1	0	—		1	0
Union Touarga	2022–23	Botola Pro	22	5	1	1	—		23	6
Union Touarga	2023–24	Botola Pro	26	9	0	0	—		26	9
Union Touarga	2024–25	Botola Pro	—		—		1 (Note: Appearance in CAF Confederation Cup)	0	1	0
Union Touarga	Total		48	14	2	1	1	0	51	15
Rodez (loan)	2024–25	Ligue 2	29	10	1	1	—		30	11
Troyes (loan)	2025–26	Ligue 2	28	18	3	2	—		31	20
Anderlecht	2026–27	Belgian Pro League	6	3	1	0	2 (Note: Appearances in UEFA Europa League)	0	9	3
Career total			111	45	7	4	3	0	121	49

=== International ===
As of match played 4 October 2026

Appearances and goals by national team and year
National team	Year	Apps	Goals
Morocco	2026	3	1
Total		3	1

Scores and results list Morocco's goal tally first, score column indicates score after each Bentayeb goal.

List of international goals scored by Tawfik Bentayeb
No.	Date	Venue	Opponent	Score	Result	Competition
1	26 May 2026	Mohammed VI Football Complexe, Salé, Morocco	Burundi	3–0	5–0	Friendly

== Honours ==
Troyes

- Ligue 2: 2025–26

Individual

- Ligue 2 top scorer: 2025–26
