= Martin Adeline =

French footballer (born 2003)

Personal information
- Full name: Martin Gabriel Belaïd Adeline
- Date of birth: 2 December 2003 (age 22)
- Place of birth: Épernay, France
- Height: 1.80 m (5 ft 11 in)
- Position: Midfielder

Team information
- Current team: Hamburger SV
- Number: 5

Youth career
- 2009–2012: Rodez
- 2012–2018: Épernay
- 2018–2020: Paris Saint-Germain
- 2020–2021: Reims

Senior career*
Years	Team	Apps	(Gls)
2020–2023	Reims II	22	(1)
2021–2024	Reims	14	(0)
2023	→ Rodez (loan)	7	(0)
2023–2024	→ Annecy (loan)	22	(2)
2024–2026	Troyes	55	(11)
2026–	Hamburger SV	7	(0)

International career
2021–2022	France U19	14	(1)
2022–2023	France U20	8	(1)
- * Club domestic league appearances and goals as of 1 November 2026

Martin Gabriel Belaïd Adeline (born 2 December 2003) is a French professional footballer who plays as a midfielder for German Bundesliga club Hamburger SV.

== Club career ==
A youth product of Rodez, Épernay, and Paris Saint-Germain, Adeline joined the reserves of Reims in 2020. He signed his first professional contract with the club on 16 December 2021. His professional debut with Reims came in a 1–1 Ligue 1 tie with Marseille on 22 December 2021.

On 31 January 2023, Adeline returned to his childhood club Rodez in Ligue 2 on loan until the end of the 2022–23 season.

On 10 August 2023, Adeline joined Ligue 2 club Annecy on a season-long loan. He made his debut for the club in a 0–0 draw to Angers. On 30 August 2024, Adeline signed for Troyes.

On 13 July 2026, Adeline signed a long-term contract with Hamburger SV in Germany's Bundesliga.

== Career statistics ==
As of match played 1 November 2026

Appearances and goals by club, season and competition
Club	Season	League			National cup		Europe		Other		Total	
Club	Season	Division	Apps	Goals	Apps	Goals	Apps	Goals	Apps	Goals	Apps	Goals
Reims II	2020–21	CFA 1	1	0	—		—		—		1	0
Reims II	2021–22	CFA 1	14	1	—		—		—		14	1
Reims II	2022–23	CFA 1	7	0	—		—		—		7	0
Reims II	Total		22	1	—		—		—		22	1
Reims	2021–22	Ligue 1	8	0	2	1	—		—		10	1
Reims	2022–23	Ligue 1	5	0	2	3	—		—		7	3
Reims	2024–25	Ligue 1	1	0	—		—		—		1	0
Reims	Total		14	0	4	4	—		—		18	4
Rodez (loan)	2022–23	Ligue 2	7	0	1	0	—		—		8	0
Annecy (loan)	2023–24	Ligue 2	22	2	1	0	—		—		23	2
Troyes	2024–25	Ligue 2	23	1	4	1	—		—		27	2
Troyes	2025–26	Ligue 2	32	10	4	1	—		—		36	11
Troyes	Total		55	11	8	2	—		—		63	13
Hamburger SV	2026–27	Bundesliga	7	0	2	0	—		—		9	0
Career total			127	14	16	6	0	0	0	0	143	20
