= Cyriaque Irié =

Burkinabé footballer (born 2005)

Personal information
- Full name: Cyriaque Kalou Bi Irié
- Date of birth: 20 June 2005 (age 21)
- Place of birth: Vavoua, Ivory Coast
- Height: 1.84 m (6 ft 0 in)
- Position: Forward

Team information
- Current team: SC Freiburg
- Number: 22

Youth career
- RC Abidjan
- –2023: Réal du Faso

Senior career*
Years	Team	Apps	(Gls)
2023–2024	Dijon	25	(6)
2023–2024	Dijon B	6	(1)
2024–2025	Troyes	33	(6)
2025–	SC Freiburg	16	(1)

International career^{‡}
2025–	Burkina Faso	11	(2)
- * Club domestic league appearances and goals as of 31 October 2026 ‡ National team caps and goals as of 9 June 2026

Cyriaque Kalou Bi Irié (born 20 June 2005) is a Burkinabé professional footballer who plays as a forward for Bundesliga club SC Freiburg. Born in the Ivory Coast, he plays for the Burkina Faso national team.

== Club career ==
Irié was born in Vavoua, Ivory Coast, before moving to Burkina Faso, where he played for Ouagadougou club Réal du Faso.

=== Dijon ===
Irié signed for French club Dijon in 2023, who were competing in Championnat National at the time. He played his first game for the club in August 2023, a 0–0 home draw against Rouen, coming on for Rayan Souici in the 79th minute. He played his first game for the Dijon B team soon after, scoring a goal and also registering an assist in a 6–1 win over Sochaux B. Irié scored his first goal for the first team in a 2–1 victory over Versailles, scoring the winner in the 84th minute. Irié would go on to register 6 goals that season, as Dijon finished 4th.

=== Troyes ===
Despite interest from several clubs, such as AC Milan, Lens, Brentford and Leicester City, Irié signed for Ligue 2 side Troyes, for a reported €3 million. He made his debut for Troyes in a 1–0 defeat to Clermont. Irié scored his first goal for his new team in a 3–0 home win over Pau. Irié made an impressive start to life at Troyes, winning player of the month in September and December.

=== Freiburg ===
Irié signed for Bundesliga outfit SC Freiburg in 2025 for an undisclosed fee. He joined the club on 1 July 2025.

== International career ==
Irié has been called up to play for both the Burkina Faso U20 and the senior team. In June 2025, Irié scored his first senior international goal in a 2-0 friendly win over Zimbabwe.

== Career statistics ==
=== Club ===
As of match played 31 October 2026

Appearances and goals by club, season and competition
Club	Season	League			National cup (Note: Includes Coupe de France, DFB-Pokal)		Europe		Total	
Club	Season	Division	Apps	Goals	Apps	Goals	Apps	Goals	Apps	Goals
Dijon	2023–24	Ligue 3	25	6	1	1	—		26	7
Dijon B	2023–24	Championnat National 2	6	1	0	0	—		6	1
Troyes	2024–25	Ligue 2	33	6	5	2	—		38	8
SC Freiburg	2025–26	Bundesliga	10	0	1	0	4 (Note: Appearances in UEFA Europa League)	0	15	0
SC Freiburg	2026–27	Bundesliga	6	1	2	0	4 (Note: Appearances in UEFA Conference League)	1	12	2
SC Freiburg	Total		16	1	3	0	8	1	27	2
Career total			79	14	9	3	8	1	96	18

=== International ===
As of match played 9 June 2026

Appearances and goals by national team and year
National team	Year	Apps	Goals
Burkina Faso	2025	7	2
Burkina Faso	2026	4	0
Total		11	2

Scores and results list Burkina Faso's goal tally first.

List of international goals scored by Cyriaque Irié
No.	Date	Venue	Opponent	Score	Result	Competition
1	6 June 2025	National Sports Stadium, Harare, Zimbabwe	Zimbabwe	1–0	2–0	Friendly
2	5 September 2025	Estádio 24 de Setembro, Bissau, Guinea-Bissau	Djibouti	1–0	6–0	2026 FIFA World Cup qualification

== Honours ==
SC Freiburg

- UEFA Europa League runner-up: 2025–26
