= Mounaïm El Idrissy =

French footballer (born 1999)

Personal information
- Date of birth: 10 February 1999 (age 27)
- Place of birth: Martigues, France
- Height: 1.81 m (5 ft 11 in)
- Position: Forward

Team information
- Current team: Raja CA
- Number: 21

Senior career*
Years	Team	Apps	(Gls)
2016–2018	Ajaccio B	27	(10)
2018–2023	Ajaccio	112	(15)
2023–2025	Kortrijk	35	(0)
2025–2026	Troyes	37	(4)
2026–	Raja CA	0	(0)
- * Club domestic league appearances and goals as of 7 September 2026

Mounaïm El Idrissy (Arabic: منعم الإدريسي; born 10 February 1999) is a French professional footballer who plays as a forward Botola Pro club Raja CA.

== Career ==
El Idrissy made his professional debut with Ajaccio in a 3–2 Ligue 2 win over Le Havre on 19 October 2018. El Idrissy scored his first professional goal in a 1–0 win over Grenoble on 2 August 2019. On 14 May 2022, Ajaccio achieved promotion to Ligue 1 as runners up after a 1–0 win over champions and fellow Ligue 2 promoted outfit Toulouse. On 5 August 2023, El Idrissy made his Ligue 1 debut in a 2–1 defeat to Lyon at the Groupama Stadium. El Idrissy scored his first goal in Ligue 1 in a 2–1 defeat to Rennes at Roazhon Park. El Idrissy finished his first Ligue 1 season with 6 goals in 32 appearances.

On 7 September 2023, El Idrissy signed with Kortrijk in Jupiler Pro League. He signed a three-year contract with the option to extend.

On 3 February 2025, El Idrissy moved back to France and joined Troyes in Ligue 2 on a one-and-a-half-year contract.

== Personal life ==
Born in France, El Idrissy is of Moroccan descent.
