= Sankhoun Diawara =

French footballer (born 2006)

Personal information
- Full name: Sankhoun Bocoum Diawara
- Date of birth: 13 January 2006 (age 20)
- Place of birth: Paris, France
- Height: 1.88 m (6 ft 2 in)
- Positions: Centre-back; left-back

Team information
- Current team: AC Milan
- Number: 13

Youth career
- 2012–2016: FC Solitaires Paris Est
- 2016–2020: CA Paris-Charenton
- 2020–2025: Troyes

Senior career*
Years	Team	Apps	(Gls)
2024–2026	Troyes II	30	(1)
2024–2026	Troyes	14	(0)
2026–	AC Milan	5	(0)

International career^{‡}
2024	France U19	2	(0)
2026–	France U21	1	(0)
- * Club domestic league appearances and goals as of 22:04, 22 November 2026 (UTC) ‡ National team caps and goals as of 23:45, 13 November 2026 (UTC)

Sankhoun Bocoum Diawara (born 13 January 2006) is a French professional footballer who plays as a centre-back and left-back for Serie A club AC Milan.

== Club career ==
=== Troyes ===
Diawara is a product of the youth academies of the French clubs FC Solitaires Paris Est, CA Paris-Charenton and Troyes. On 26 June 2024, he signed his first professional contract with Troyes until 2027. On 16 November 2024, he debuted with Troyes in a 3–1 Coupe de France win over FC Foron. He helped them win the 2025–26 Ligue 2 to earn promotion to Ligue 1.

=== AC Milan ===
On 29 July 2026, Diawara transferred to Italian Serie A club AC Milan and signed a contract until 30 June 2031.

== International career ==
Diawara was called up to the France U19s in September 2024.

In November 2026, he was called-up with the France U21s by head coach Gérald Baticle.

== Personal life ==
Diawara is nicknamed Papis. His father is of Senegalese and Malian descent, and his mother is of Senegalese and Guinean descent.

== Career statistics ==
=== Club ===
As of match played 22 November 2026

Appearances and goals by club, season and competition
Club	Season	League			National cup (Note: Includes Coupe de France, Coppa Italia)		Europe		Total	
Club	Season	Division	Apps	Goals	Apps	Goals	Apps	Goals	Apps	Goals
Troyes II	2023–24	National 3	3	0	—		—		3	0
Troyes II	2024–25	National 2	20	1	1	0	—		21	1
Troyes II	2025–26	National 2	7	0	0	0	—		7	0
Troyes II	Total		30	1	1	0	—		31	1
Troyes	2025–26	Ligue 2	14	0	3	1	—		17	1
AC Milan	2026–27	Serie A	5	0	0	0	3 (Note: Appearance in UEFA Europa League)	0	8	0
Career Total			49	1	4	1	3	0	56	2

== Honours ==
Troyes

- Ligue 2: 2025–26
