= Hugo Gambor =

Central African Republic footballer (born 2002)

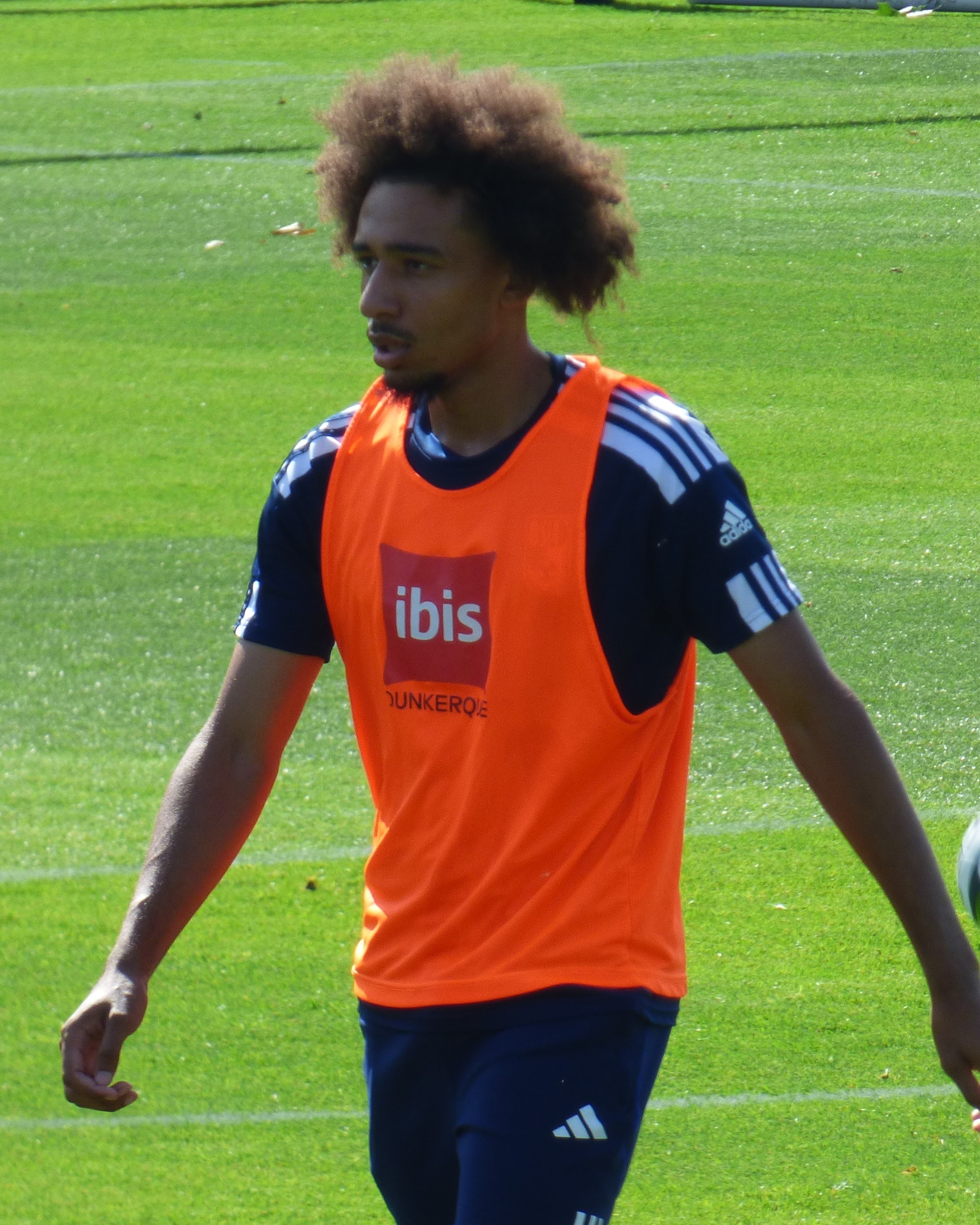
- Gambor in 2023

Personal information
- Date of birth: 30 December 2002 (age 23)
- Place of birth: Blois, France
- Height: 1.86 m (6 ft 1 in)
- Position: Centre-back

Team information
- Current team: Académico de Viseu
- Number: 82

Youth career
- 2007–2019: Blois Football 41

Senior career*
Years	Team	Apps	(Gls)
2019–2020	Orléans II	6	(0)
2020–2022	Paris FC II	21	(0)
2022–2024	USL Dunkerque	46	(1)
2024–2026	KAA Gent	21	(1)
2025–2026	→ Troyes (loan)	16	(0)
2026–	Académico de Viseu	0	(0)

International career^{‡}
2024–	Central African Republic	3	(1)
- * Club domestic league appearances and goals as of 11 May 2026 ‡ National team caps and goals as of 19 March 2025

Hugo Gambor (born 30 December 2002) is a professional footballer who plays as a centre-back for Primeira Liga club Académico de Viseu. Born in France, he plays for the Central African Republic national team.

== Career ==
Gambor is a youth product of his local club Blois Football 41 for 12 seasons. He began his senior career with the reserves of Orléans in 2019. On 15 June 2020, he signed his first professional contract with Paris FC, where he again joined the reserves. He transferred to USL Dunkerque in the summer of 2022 until 2025, and in his debut season helped the club earn promotion to the Ligue 2.

On 31 January 2024, Gambor signed for Belgian Pro League club KAA Gent on a three-and-a-half-year contract.

On 27 August 2025, Gambor joined Troyes in the Ligue 2, on loan with an option to buy.

On 4 September 2026, he moved to Portugal and signed a one-season deal with Primeira Liga club Académico de Viseu.

== International career ==
Born in France, Gambor is of Central African descent and holds dual nationality. He was called up for a training camp for the France U18s in January 2020. In August 2023, he opted to represent the Central African Republic national team. He debuted on 5 September 2024 an Africa Cup of Nations qualifier against Lesotho.

== Career statistics ==
=== Club ===
As of match played 16 March 2025

Appearances and goals by club, season and competition
Club	Season	League			National Cup		Continental		Other		Total	
Club	Season	Division	Apps	Goals	Apps	Goals	Apps	Goals	Apps	Goals	Apps	Goals
Orléans II	2019–20	Championnat National 3	6	0	—		—		—		6	0
Paris II	2020–21	Championnat National 3	5	0	—		—		—		5	0
Paris II	2021–22	Championnat National 3	16	0	—		—		—		16	0
Paris II	Total		27	0	—		—		—		27	0
Dunkerque	2022–23	Championnat National	27	1	2	0	—		—		29	1
Dunkerque	2023–24	Ligue 2	19	0	2	0	—		—		21	0
Dunkerque	Total		46	1	4	0	—		—		50	1
Gent	2023–24	Belgian Pro League	2	0	—		0	0	—		2	0
Gent	2024–25	Belgian Pro League	18	1	2	0	8 (Note: Appearances in UEFA Conference League)	0	—		28	1
Gent	Total		20	1	2	0	8	0	—		30	1
Career total			93	2	6	0	8	0	0	0	107	2

=== International ===
As of match played 19 March 2025

Appearances and goals by national team and year
National team	Year	Apps	Goals
Central African Republic	2024	2	0
Central African Republic	2025	1	1
Total		3	1
