= Anis Ouzenadji =

French footballer (born 2006)

Personal information
- Date of birth: 4 November 2006 (age 19)
- Place of birth: Aubervilliers, France
- Height: 1.77 m (5 ft 10 in)
- Position: Left-back

Team information
- Current team: Troyes
- Number: 3

Youth career
- 2013–2020: Esperance Paris 19ème
- 2020–2021: Drancy
- 2021–2023: Troyes

Senior career*
| Years | Team | Apps | (Gls) |
| 2023–2025 | Troyes II | 21 | (1) |
| 2025– | Troyes | 21 | (1) |

International career^{‡}
| 2024 | France U19 | 2 | (0) |
- * Club domestic league appearances and goals as of 11 May 2026 ‡ National team caps and goals as of 19:13, 3 February 2025 (UTC)

Anis Ouzenadji (born 4 November 2006) is a French professional footballer who plays as a left-back for Ligue 1 club Troyes.

== Career ==
Ouzenadji is a product of the youth academies of the French clubs Esperance Paris 19ème, Drancy and Troyes. He was promoted to Troyes' reserves in 2023, and on 11 February 2024 signed his first professional contract with the club. He was promoted to Troyes' senior team in Ligue 2 in 2025, and helped them win the 2025–26 season to earn promotion to Ligue 1.

== International career ==
Born in France, Ouzenadji is of Algerian descent. In September 2024, he was called up to the France U19s for a set of friendlies.

== Honours ==
Troyes

- Ligue 2: 2025–26
