= Rayane Messi =

French footballer (born 2007)

Personal information
- Full name: Rayane Messi Tanfouri
- Date of birth: 23 May 2007 (age 19)
- Place of birth: Sèvres, France
- Height: 1.75 m (5 ft 9 in)
- Position: Winger

Team information
- Current team: Al-Ettifaq (on loan from Strasbourg)
- Number: 80

Youth career
- 2015–2017: Chaville
- 2017–2022: Versailles
- 2022–2024: Dijon

Senior career*
| Years | Team | Apps | (Gls) |
| 2023–2024 | Dijon B | 9 | (3) |
| 2024 | Dijon | 4 | (1) |
| 2024– | Strasbourg B | 9 | (0) |
| 2024– | Strasbourg | 0 | (0) |
| 2025–2026 | → Pau (loan) | 14 | (2) |
| 2026 | → Neom (loan) | 13 | (1) |
| 2026– | → Al-Ettifaq (loan) | 2 | (1) |

International career^{‡}
| 2022–2023 | France U16 | 8 | (2) |
| 2023–2024 | France U17 | 11 | (4) |
| 2024– | France U19 | 8 | (1) |
- * Club domestic league appearances and goals as of 21 May 2026 ‡ National team caps and goals as of 31 March 2026

Rayane Messi Tanfouri (born 23 May 2007) is a French footballer who plays as a winger for Saudi Pro League club Al-Ettifaq, on loan from Ligue 1 club Strasbourg.

In 2024, Messi was named by English newspaper The Guardian as one of the best players born in 2007 worldwide.

== Early life ==
Messi was born in Sèvres, Hauts-de-Seine in the Paris suburbs area, to a Cameroonian father of Sudanese descent, Zacharie Messi Tanfouri, and a Tunisian mother. He took his first footballing steps by joining local side FC Chaville in 2015. Alongside football, his father also enrolled him in futsal when he was younger to improve his accuracy in tight spaces and increase his cardio. As a result, Messi displayed technical ease and had above-average physical abilities, which quickly caught the eye of the big teams in the region. As a result, he left Chaville in 2017 and joined FC Versailles.

In 2020, Messi moved to the Clairefontaine academy, showing impressive technical qualities leading to numerous French clubs attempting to sign him. In 2022, at the age of 14, he chose to join the youth academy of Dijon, signing a three-year contract.

== Club career ==
=== Dijon ===
Impressing in the youth ranks, Messi was promoted to Dijon's reserves side and made his Championnat National 3 debut in August 2023 at the age of 16. On 5 April 2024, he made his first senior debut with Dijon, coming in as a substitute in the clubs 0–2 defeat against his former team Versailles. At 16 years old, 10 months and 13 days, he became the youngest player to have played for Dijon. A week later, he appeared again for Dijon as a substitute and scored the only goal for the match to bring his team a 1–0 victory against Orléans. The goal made him the youngest goalscorer in Dijon's history.

=== Strasbourg ===
On 14 August 2024, Messi signed for Ligue 1 club Strasbourg on a three-year deal.

=== Loan to Pau FC ===
In 08 2025, Rayane Messi was loaned for one season to Pau FC from RC Strasbourg. He was assigned the number 7 shirt at the Béarn-based club. The loan followed the departure of Pathé Mboup, who signed for Stade Brestois 29. Rayane Messi made his Ligue 2 debut for Pau FC in September 2025, at a time when the club was unbeaten and co-leading the league. Starting as a centre forward to compensate for the departure of Mboup, he experienced a difficult first outing in a 3–0 home defeat at Nouste Camp to Red Star FC.

He retained his place in the starting eleven the following week away to Boulogne-sur-Mer. In a new 4–4–2 attacking system adapted to his technical abilities, he featured up front with Kyliane Dong and Giovani Versini providing width. Pau FC won the match 3–0, a result that kept the club near the top of the table.

== International career ==
Messi is a youth international for France, having played for the under-16s and under-17s. In March 2024, he scored a brace to help France U17 win 2–1 against England as part of the Euro U17 Elite Round, thus qualify his team to the final tournament. Two months after, he was selected in France U17's squad for the Euro U17.

== Career statistics ==
=== Club ===
As of match played 22 May 2026

Appearances and goals by club, season and competition
| Club | Season | League | | | Cup | | Europe | | Other | | Total | |
| Club | Season | Division | Apps | Goals | Apps | Goals | Apps | Goals | Apps | Goals | Apps | Goals |
|---|---|---|---|---|---|---|---|---|---|---|---|---|
| Dijon B | 2023–24 | Championnat National 3 | 9 | 2 | — | | — | | — | | 9 | 1 |
| Dijon | 2023–24 | Championnat National | 4 | 1 | 0 | 0 | — | | — | | 4 | 1 |
| Strasbourg B | 2024–25 | Championnat National 3 | 9 | 0 | — | | — | | — | | 9 | 0 |
| Strasbourg | 2024–25 | Ligue 1 | 0 | 0 | 2 | 2 | — | | — | | 2 | 2 |
| Strasbourg | 2026–27 | Ligue 1 | 0 | 0 | 0 | 0 | — | | — | | 0 | 0 |
| Strasbourg | Total | | 0 | 0 | 2 | 2 | — | | — | | 2 | 2 |
| Pau (loan) | 2025–26 | Ligue 2 | 14 | 2 | 0 | 0 | — | | — | | 14 | 2 |
| Neom (loan) | 2025–26 | Saudi Pro League | 13 | 1 | — | | — | | — | | 13 | 1 |
| Career total | | | 49 | 6 | 2 | 2 | 0 | 0 | 0 | 0 | 51 | 7 |

== Style of play ==
Messi's coach at Versailles, Matthieu Merle, praised him for “his strength, his explosiveness and his ability to make differences in one-on-one situations”.
