= Cheikh Fall (footballer, born 2004) =

Senegalese footballer (born 2004)

Personal information
- Full name: Cheikh Fall
- Date of birth: 25 February 2004 (age 22)
- Place of birth: Dakar, Senegal
- Position: Attacking midfielder

Team information
- Current team: Pau FC
- Number: 6

Youth career
- 2019–2022: Espoirs de Guédiawaye

Senior career*
| Years | Team | Apps | (Gls) |
| 2022–2025 | Saint-Étienne B | 27 | (6) |
| 2023–2025 | AS Saint-Étienne | 4 | (0) |
| 2025– | Pau FC | 22 | (2) |
- * Club domestic league appearances and goals as of 11 May 2026

Cheikh Fall (born 25 February 2004) is a Senegalese professional footballer who plays as an attacking midfielder forLigue 2 club Pau FC.

== Club career ==
Born in Dakar, Cheikh Fall began playing football at a young age with a local football school, which led to his recruitment by Espoirs de Guédiawaye, a club known for developing young talent in Senegal. At 15, he joined Guédiawaye’s youth setup, progressing to the senior team by 17, where he became a key player, scoring multiple goals.

In July 2022, Fall signed a professional trainee contract with AS Saint-Étienne, a club partnered with Guédiawaye. Visa issues delayed his arrival until September 2022, when he debuted for Saint-Étienne’s U19 team, scoring in a 3–2 loss to Marseille. He later scored a hat-trick in a 3–3 draw against Monaco’s U19 side. In October 2022, he joined Saint-Étienne’s reserve team in the Championnat National 3, scoring a decisive header in a 2–1 win over Clermont’s reserves.

In June 2023, Fall made his professional debut for Saint-Étienne’s senior team, appearing as a substitute in a 2–0 Ligue 2 victory against Valenciennes. He signed a full professional contract in July 2023, extending until June 2026. Over the next two seasons, he played three additional Ligue 2 matches while remaining a regular for the reserves, where he scored 6 goals in 27 appearances.

With his contract nearing its end, Fall attracted interest from Ligue 2 clubs. On 19 August 2025, Fall joined Pau FC on a three-year contract, wearing the number 6 shirt. The transfer was free, with Saint-Étienne retaining a 50% sell-on clause and potential bonuses.
