= Merwan Ifnaoui =

French footballer (born 1998)

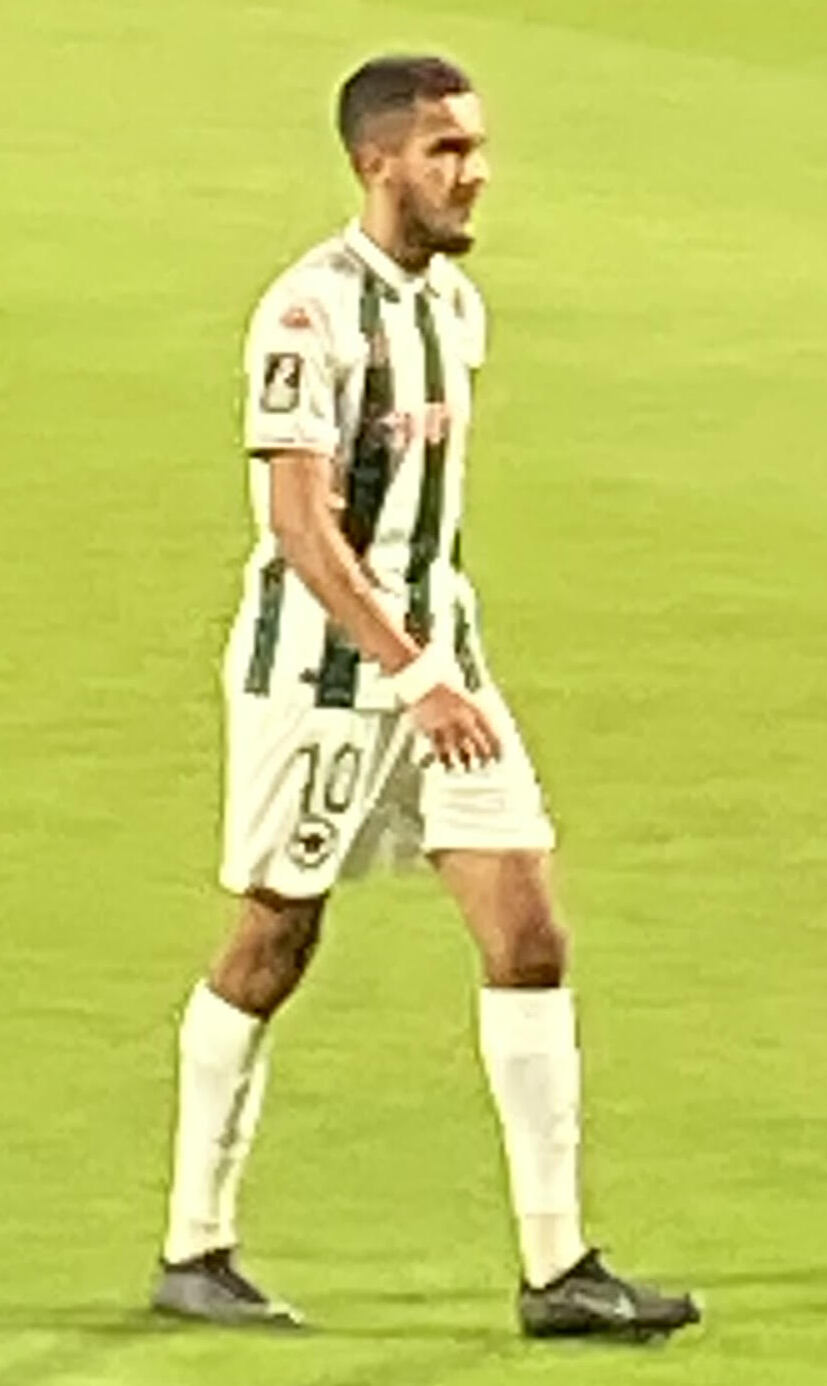
- Ifnaoui with Red Star in 2024

Personal information
- Date of birth: 22 October 1998 (age 28)
- Place of birth: Colombes, France
- Height: 1.80 m (5 ft 11 in)
- Position: Midfielder

Team information
- Current team: Troyes
- Number: 10

Youth career
- La Garenne-Colombes
- Asnières
- Red Star
- Gennevilliers

Senior career*
Years	Team	Apps	(Gls)
2018–2019	Gennevilliers		
2019–2020	Lagoa		
2020–2023	Racing Club de France	39	(12)
2023–2025	Red Star	81	(5)
2025–	Troyes	26	(4)
- * Club domestic league appearances and goals as of 11 May 2026

Merwan Ifnaoui (born 22 October 1998) is a French professional footballer who plays as a midfielder for Ligue 1 club Troyes.

== Career ==
Born in Colombes, France, Ifnaoui grew up in the Agnettes neighbourhood of Gennevilliers. He played youth football for La Garenne-Colombes, Asnières and Red Star before returning to Gennevilliers at U19 level, where he captained the team in the 2018–19 season. He had a stint with a Portuguese club in Lagoa, Azores.

From 2020 Ifnaoui played for Racing Club de France. He contributed seven goals and seven assists in the first half of the 2022–23 season with the club being in contention for promotion to Championnat National.

Ifnaoui joined Red Star of the third-tier Championnat National in February 2023. The transfer fee paid to Racing Club de France Football was reported as €50,000.

During October 2023 he made three assists scoring once and was nominated for the player of the month award. On 11 May 2024, the French Football Federation awarded him the title of best player in the Championnat National for the 2023–24 season. At the time, he had scored three goals and provided seven assists in 32 league appearances.

On 27 June 2025, Ifnaoui signed a two-year contract with Troyes.

== Personal life ==
Born in France, Ifnaoui is of Moroccan descent.

== Career statistics ==
As of match played 26 August 2024

Appearances and goals by club, season and competition
Club	Season	League			Coupe de France		Total	
Club	Season	Division	Apps	Goals	Apps	Goals	Apps	Goals
Racing Club de France	2020–21	Championnat National 3	3	0	—		3	0
Racing Club de France	2021–22	Championnat National 3	22	5	—		22	5
Racing Club de France	2022–23	Championnat National 2	14	7	—		14	7
Racing Club de France	Total		39	12	—		39	12
Red Star	2022–23	Championnat National	14	0	—		14	0
Red Star	2023–24	Championnat National	33	3	1	0	34	3
Red Star	2024–25	Ligue 2	2	0	0	0	2	0
Red Star	Total		39	3	1	0	40	3
Career total			78	15	1	0	79	15

== Honours ==
Racing Club de France

- Championnat National 3: 2021–22

Red Star

- Championnat National: 2023–24

Individual

- Championnat National best player: 2023–24
