= Antoine Mille =

French footballer (born 1997)

Personal information
- Date of birth: 14 August 1997 (age 29)
- Place of birth: Toulouse, France
- Height: 1.81 m (5 ft 11 in)
- Position: Midfielder

Team information
- Current team: Troyes
- Number: 17

Youth career
- 2002–2004: TOAC
- 2004–2011: Toulouse
- 2011–2017: Colomiers

Senior career*
Years	Team	Apps	(Gls)
2017–2021	Colomiers	27	(0)
2021–2022	Bourg-Péronnas	57	(6)
2023–2024	Châteauroux	38	(6)
2024–2025	Pau	33	(5)
2025–	Troyes	33	(3)
- * Club domestic league appearances and goals as of 11 May 2026

Antoine Mille (born 14 August 1997) is a French professional footballer who plays as a midfielder for Ligue 1 club Troyes.

== Club career ==
Mille was born in Toulouse on 14 August 1997, and began playing football at the age of 5 with TOAC. He later joined the youth ranks of Toulouse FC. At 14, when Toulouse FC decided not to retain him in their academy, he signed with Colomiers. After spending a season with the U19 team, Mille moved up to Colomiers' senior team for the 2017–18 Championnat National 2 season, having initially played with the reserve and third teams.

Mille made his Championnat National 2 debut with Colomiers in January 2018, appearing in five matches, two of which he started, during the second half of the season. He spent three more seasons in the suburbs of Toulouse, where he played 29 National 2 matches and recorded three assists.

At the start of the 2021–22 Championnat National season, Mille trialed at the request of Alain Pochat, the coach of Bourg-Péronnas. Recently relegated from Ligue 2, the Ain-based club signed him in the summer of 2021 to bolster their squad. Like at Colomiers, Mille made the most of his opportunities in the Coupe de France to showcase his abilities, earning his first Championnat National starts in October. He missed just one match before the winter break, securing two starts. The second half of the season was markedly different: after starting in the 18th round, he went on to make 13 consecutive starts before an injury forced him to miss two weekends of competition. He concluded his first National 1 season with one goal, two assists, and 1,364 minutes played, contributing to a team that finished sixth in the standings.

His second season at Bourg-Péronnas under Alain Pochat, confirmed his talent. He played in 32 of the 34 possible matches, started 27 times, scored five goals, and provided three assists. Despite a tough season for the team, which finished 14th and was relegated to Championnat National 2 Mille stood out.

Released during the summer, Mille attracted interest from several clubs and signed with Châteauroux. Facing financial difficulties, Châteauroux endured a challenging season, finishing 12th and narrowly avoiding relegation. However, Mille shone, improving his stats with four goals and seven assists in 32 matches, all of which he started. Contributing to 27% of his team's goals, he also had a notable run in the Coupe de France, scoring two goals and providing one assist. His performances were widely praised, and he was among the three nominees for the Best Player award at the Championnat National Trophies.

Mille signed with Pau at the start of the 2024–25 Ligue 2 season. Mille made his Ligue 2 debut for Pau on 16 August 2024 in a 2-2 draw against Clermont at the Stade Gabriel-Montpied.

On 30 July 2025, Mille signed for Ligue 2 club Troyes on a three-year contract.

== Personal life ==
While playing for Châteauroux, Mille scored a superb goal in the match against Les Herbiers in the Coupe de France. His team eventually won the penalty shootout 4–3 after a 2–2 draw at the end of regular time, advancing to the Round of 16. However, Mille faced criticism for missing a panenka attempt during the shootout—a poorly executed attempt that quickly gained attention on social media, leading to widespread mockery. The situation was further highlighted by the reaction of the opposing goalkeeper, Téo Hamelin, who, visibly frustrated, threw the ball with anger after saving Mille's panenka.

Mille is also a passionate supporter of Monaco.
