= Aristide Zossou =

Ivorian winger (born 2005)

Personal information
- Full name: Mahussi Aristide Zossou
- Date of birth: 14 June 2005 (age 21)
- Place of birth: Abobo, Ivory Coast
- Height: 1.78 m (5 ft 10 in)
- Position: Winger

Team information
- Current team: Auxerre

Youth career
- –2024: Afrique Football Élite

Senior career*
Years	Team	Apps	(Gls)
2024–	Auxerre	3	(0)
2024–2025	Auxerre B	17	(7)
2025–2025	Dunkerque (loan)	31	(4)
- * Club domestic league appearances and goals as of 11 May 2026

Mahussi Aristide Zossou (born 14 June 2005) is an Ivorian professional footballer who plays as a winger for Ligue 1 club Auxerre.

== Club career ==
Zossou joined Ligue 1 club Auxerre on 2 September 2024. He made his professional debut against Monaco on 14 September 2024.

Zossou was loaned to Dunkerque on 23 July 2025.
