= Mathis Hamdi =

French footballer (born 2003)

Personal information
- Date of birth: 18 October 2003 (age 23)
- Place of birth: Créteil, France
- Height: 1.80 m (5 ft 11 in)
- Position: Left-back

Team information
- Current team: Quevilly-Rouen
- Number: 18

Youth career
- 2008–2010: Saint-André
- 2010–2021: Troyes

Senior career*
Years	Team	Apps	(Gls)
2021–2026	Troyes II	72	(1)
2023–2026	Troyes	11	(0)
2026	Le Mans	4	(0)
2026–	Quevilly-Rouen	0	(0)
- * Club domestic league appearances and goals as of 11 May 2026

Mathis Hamdi (born 18 October 2003) is a French professional footballer who plays as a left-back for Ligue 3 club Quevilly-Rouen.

== Career ==
A youth product of his local club Saint-André, Hamdi joined the youth academy of Troyes at the age of 7. He worked his way up their youth categories, starting for their reserve sides in 2021. He made his professional debut with Troyes as a late substitute in a 2–0 Coupe de France loss to LOSC Lille on 8 January 2023.

On 14 January 2026, Hamdi signed with Le Mans.

== Honours ==
Troyes

- Ligue 2: 2025–26
