= Hillel Konaté =

Footballer (born 1994)

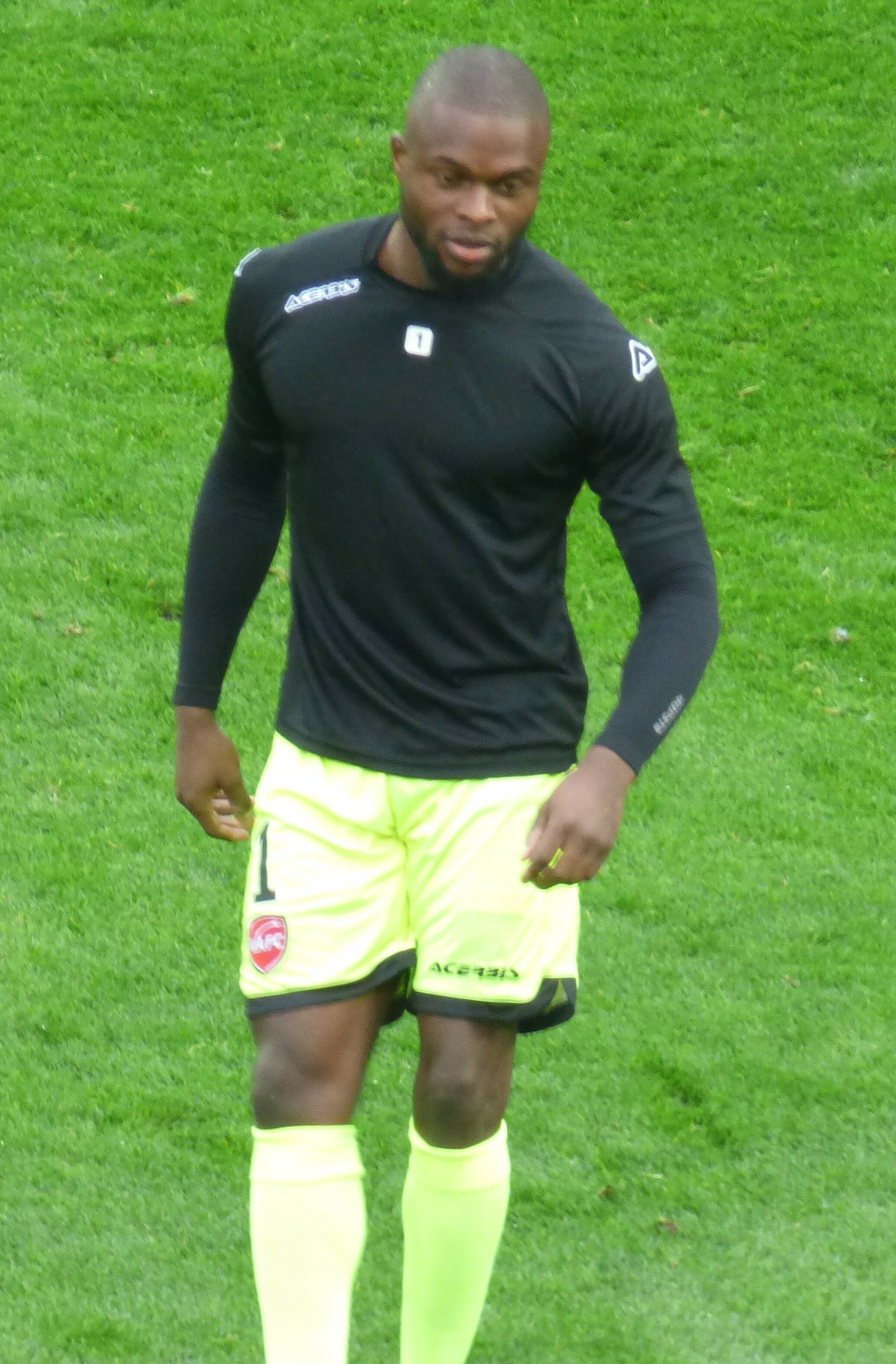
- Konaté in 2018

Personal information
- Full name: Hillel-Yored Amilcar Tony Konaté
- Date of birth: 28 December 1994 (age 31)
- Place of birth: Poitiers, France
- Height: 1.82 m (6 ft 0 in)
- Position: Goalkeeper

Team information
- Current team: Troyes
- Number: 40

Youth career
- 2007–2009: Châteauroux
- 2009–2015: Sochaux

Senior career*
Years	Team	Apps	(Gls)
2012–2015	Sochaux B	35	(0)
2016–2018	Boulogne B	22	(0)
2017–2018	Boulogne	10	(0)
2018–2023	Valenciennes	13	(0)
2019–2023	Valenciennes B	7	(0)
2023–2025	Châteauroux	49	(0)
2025–	Troyes	23	(0)

International career^{‡}
2011	Ivory Coast U17	4	(0)
2022–	Burkina Faso	1	(0)
- * Club domestic league appearances and goals as of 11 May 2026 ‡ National team caps and goals as of 21:28, 22 November 2022 (UTC)

Hillel-Yored Amilcar Tony Konaté (born 28 December 1994) is a professional footballer who plays as a goalkeeper for Ligue 1 club Troyes. Born in France, and a former youth international for the Ivory Coast, Konaté plays for the Burkina Faso national team.

== Professional career ==
Konaté began playing football in the youth academy of Châteauroux, and moved to the academy Sochaux II in 2009.

On 12 June 2018, Konaté transferred from Boulogne to Valenciennes in the Ligue 2. He made his professional debut with Valenciennes in a 1–0 Coupe de la Ligue loss to Lorient on 14 August 2018.

On 24 July 2023, Châteauroux announced that they had made a contract with Konaté.

On 7 July 2025, Troyes signed a two-year contract with Ligue 2 club Troyes.

== International career ==
Konaté was born in France and is Ivorian and Burkinabé by descent. He represented the Ivory Coast U17s at the 2011 FIFA U-17 World Cup, starting in all 4 of their matches in the tournament.

He was called up to the senior Ivory Coast national football team in 2015, but did not make an appearance. In 2022, he was called up to the Burkina Faso national team for a set of friendlies. He debuted with Burkina Faso in a 2–1 friendly win over Comoros on 27 September 2022.
