= Lucas Maronnier =

French footballer (born 2000)

Personal information
- Date of birth: 9 March 2000 (age 26)
- Place of birth: Meaux, France
- Height: 1.74 m (5 ft 9 in)
- Position: Right-back

Team information
- Current team: Troyes
- Number: 2

Youth career
- 2005–2012: USF Trilport
- 2012–2013: Meaux
- 2013–2018: Paris Saint-Germain
- 2018–2019: Guingamp

Senior career*
Years	Team	Apps	(Gls)
2019–2025	Guingamp II	56	(1)
2022–2025	Guingamp	34	(1)
2025–	Troyes	22	(0)
- * Club domestic league appearances and goals as of 23:28, 16 May 2026 (UTC) ‡ National team caps and goals as of 23:28, 16 May 2026 (UTC)

Lucas Maronnier (born 9 March 2000) is a French professional footballer who plays as a right-back for Ligue 1 club Troyes.

== Career ==
Maronnier is a product of the youth academies of the French clubs USF Trilport, Meaux, Paris Saint-Germain, and Guingamp. He was promoted to Guingamp's reserves in 2019, and on 18 July 2023 signed his first professional contract with the club until 2025 and was promoted to their senior team. On 22 June 2025, he transferred to Troyes on a 2-year contract. He helped them win the 2025–26 season to earn promotion to Ligue 1.

== Honours ==
Troyes

- Ligue 2: 2025–26
