= Kyliane Dong =

French footballer (born 2004)

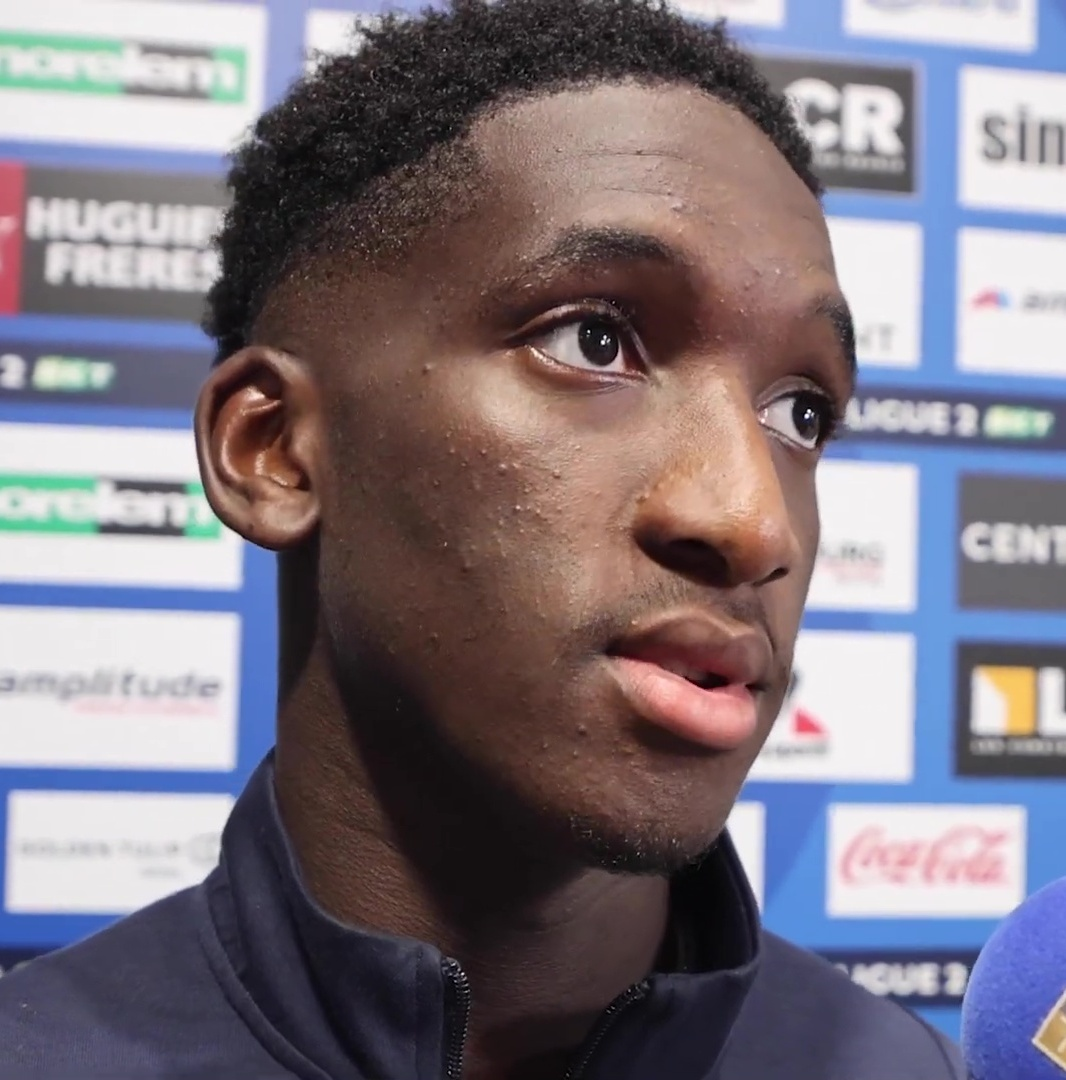
- Dong in 2023

Personal information
- Full name: Kyliane Isaac Yanis Dong
- Date of birth: 27 September 2004 (age 22)
- Place of birth: Évry-Courcouronnes, France
- Height: 1.78 m (5 ft 10 in)
- Position: Forward

Team information
- Current team: Bolton Wanderers (on loan from FC Augsburg)
- Number: 7

Youth career
- 2017–2018: Fleury
- 2018–2021: Troyes

Senior career*
Years	Team	Apps	(Gls)
2021–2024	Troyes II	27	(3)
2022–2025	Troyes	53	(4)
2025–	FC Augsburg	0	(0)
2025–2026	→ Pau (loan)	29	(6)
2026–	→ Bolton Wanderers (loan)	13	(0)
- * Club domestic league appearances and goals as of 14:46, 7 July 2026 (UTC)

Kyliane Isaac Yanis Dong (born 27 September 2004) is a French professional footballer who plays as a forward for EFL Championship club Bolton Wanderers, on loan from Bundesliga club FC Augsburg.

== Career ==
A youth product of Fleury and Troyes, he began his senior career with their reserves in 2021. He signed his first professional contract with the club on 16 June 2022, tying him to the club for three years. He made his professional debut with Troyes in a 3–2 Ligue 2 loss to Montpellier on 7 August 2022.

On 24 April 2025, it was announced that Dong had signed a contract until 2030 with Bundesliga side FC Augsburg, joining on a free transfer after the upcoming expiry of his contract with Troyes. On 1 September 2025, Augsburg loaned Dong to Pau for the 2025–26 season. On 7 July 2026, he joined EFL Championship club Bolton Wanderers on a season long loan with the option of a permanent deal at the end.

== Personal life ==
Born in France, Dong is of Cameroonian descent.
