= Morgan Bokele =

Footballer (born 2004)

Personal information
- Full name: Morgan Bokele Mputu
- Date of birth: 13 March 2004 (age 22)
- Place of birth: Lyon, France
- Height: 1.75 m (5 ft 9 in)
- Position: Winger

Team information
- Current team: Metz

Youth career
- 2019–2023: Metz

Senior career*
Years	Team	Apps	(Gls)
2021–	Metz B	41	(13)
2024–	Metz	38	(3)
2024	→ Épinal (loan)	14	(1)
2026	→ Dunkerque (loan)	12	(1)
- * Club domestic league appearances and goals as of 11 May 2026

Morgan Bokele Mputu (born 13 March 2004) is a professional footballer who plays as a winger for Ligue 2 club Metz. Born in France, he has represented Cameroon at youth international level.

== Club career ==
Bokele joined the youth academy of Metz in 2019. On 1 February 2024, he signed his first professional contract with the club, a deal until June 2026. He was simultaneously loaned out to Championnat National club Épinal for the remainder of the season. On 19 August 2024, on his Ligue 2 debut for Metz, Bokele had a "considerable impact" as a substitute, being involved in the free-kick that led to his team's equalizing goal in stoppage time to secure a 1–1 draw against Bastia.

On 28 May 2025, the club announced Bokele has extended his contract until 2028. On 21 January 2026, he was loaned by Dunkerque in Ligue 2.

== International career ==
In October 2021, Bokele was called up to the Cameroon under-23s for the first time.

== Personal life ==
Born in France, Bokele is of Cameroonian descent. His brother Malcom Bokele is also a professional footballer.

== Career statistics ==
As of match played 18 January 2026

Appearances and goals by club, season and competition
Club	Season	League			Coupe de France		Europe		Other		Total	
Club	Season	Division	Apps	Goals	Apps	Goals	Apps	Goals	Apps	Goals	Apps	Goals
Metz B	2021–22	CFA 2	6	0	—		—		—		6	0
Metz B	2022–23	CFA 2	16	2	—		—		—		16	2
Metz B	2023–24	National 3	13	8	—		—		—		13	8
Metz B	2024–25	National 3	4	1	—		—		—		4	1
Metz B	2025–26	National 3	0	0	—		—		—		0	0
Metz B	Total		39	11	—		—		—		39	11
Metz	2023–24	Ligue 1	0	0	0	0	—		—		0	0
Metz	2024–25	Ligue 2	28	3	3	0	—		3 (Note: Appearances in Ligue 1 relegation/promotion play-offs)	0	34	3
Metz	2025–26	Ligue 1	10	0	2	0	—		—		12	0
Metz	Total		38	3	5	0	—		3	0	46	3
Épinal (loan)	2023–24	CFA	14	1	—		—		—		14	1
Dunkerque (loan)	2025–26	Ligue 2	2	0	—		—		—		2	0
Career total			93	15	5	0	0	0	3	0	101	15
