= Jaurès Assoumou =

Ivorian footballer (born 2005)

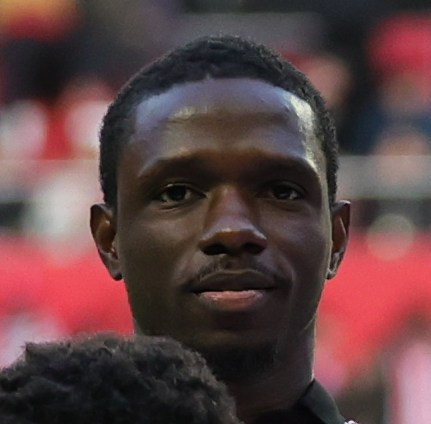
- Assoumou in 2026

Personal information
- Full name: Kouadou Jaurès Assoumou
- Date of birth: 17 October 2002 (age 24)
- Place of birth: Dabou, Ivory Coast
- Height: 1.82 m (6 ft 0 in)
- Position: Forward

Team information
- Current team: Samsunspor
- Number: 15

Youth career
- Afrique Football Élite
- 2021–2022: Troyes

Senior career*
Years	Team	Apps	(Gls)
2022–2024	Troyes B	27	(11)
2023–2026	Troyes	62	(8)
2026–	Samsunspor	6	(1)

International career
2023	Ivory Coast U23	1	(0)
- * Club domestic league appearances and goals as of 10 June 2026

Kouadou Jaurès Assoumou (born 17 October 2002) is an Ivorian professional footballer who plays as a forward for Turkish Süper Lig club Samsunspor.

== Career ==
A youth product of the Malian youth academy Afrique Football Élite, Assoumou joined the youth academy of Troyes in 2021, and shortly after was promoted to their reserves. In 2022, he started playing with their senior side in the Ligue 2. On 19 June 2023, he signed his first professional contract with Troyes until 2026.

On 22 January 2026, Assoumou moved to Samsunspor in Turkey.

== International career ==
Born in Ivory Coast and raised in Mali, Assoumou holds dual Ivorian-Malian citizenship. On 11 November 2023, Assoumou was called up to the Ivory Coast U23s for a set of friendlies.

== Honours ==
Troyes

- Ligue 2: 2025–26
