= Amadou Samoura =

French footballer (born 2003)

Personal information
- Date of birth: 21 November 2003 (age 22)
- Place of birth: Montivilliers, France
- Height: 1.88 m (6 ft 2 in)
- Position: Forward

Team information
- Current team: Guingamp
- Number: 17

Senior career*
| Years | Team | Apps | (Gls) |
| 2020–2024 | Le Havre B | 48 | (13) |
| 2021–2024 | Le Havre | 2 | (0) |
| 2024–2026 | Concarneau | 27 | (4) |
| 2026– | Guingamp | 9 | (3) |
- * Club domestic league appearances and goals as of 11 May 2026

Amadou Samoura (born 21 November 2003) is a French professional footballer who plays as a forward for Ligue 2 club Guingamp.

== Club career ==
Samoura made his professional debut with Le Havre in a 0–0 Ligue 2 tie with Valenciennes on 6 November 2021.

On 13 January 2026, Samoura signed a three-and-a-half-year contract with Guingamp.

== Personal life ==
Born in France, Samoura holds French and Senegalese nationalities.
