= Stade de l'Aube =

Stadium in Troyes, France

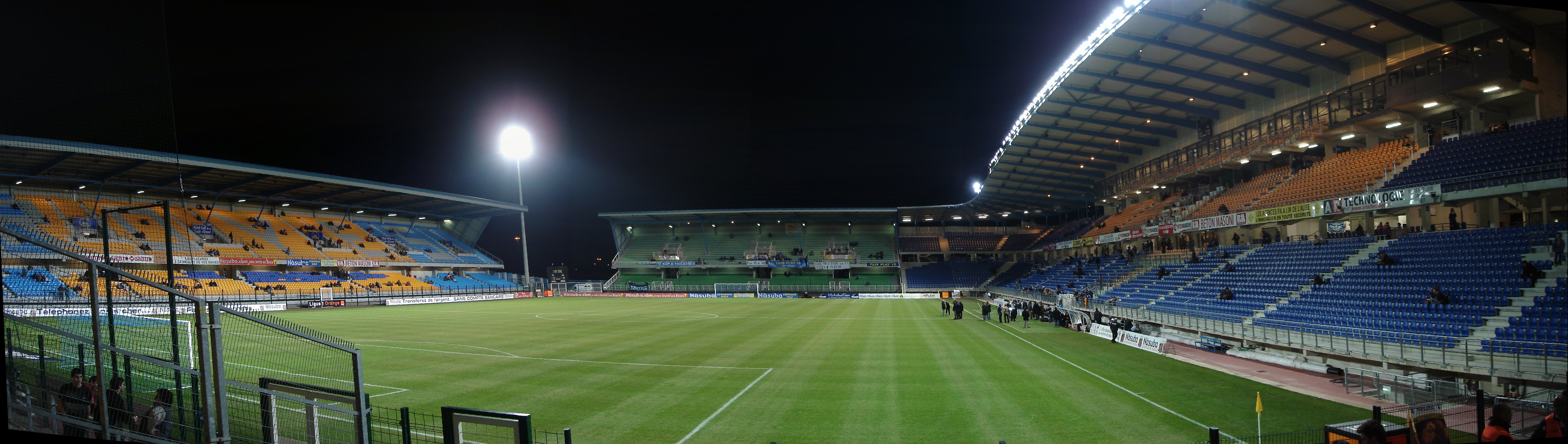
- Interactive map of Stade de l'Aube
- Address: Avenue Robert-Schumann
- Location: Troyes, France
- Coordinates: 48°18′27″N 4°05′54″E
- Capacity: 20,400
- Surface: AirFibr (hybrid grass)

Construction
- Opened: 1924
- Renovated: 1956, 2004
- Architects: Chabanne et Partenaires (2004 remodel)

Tenant
- Troyes AC

Website
- Stade de l'Aube

Stade de l'Aube (French pronunciation: [stad də lob]) is a multi-use stadium in Troyes, France. It is currently used mostly for football matches, by Troyes AC. The stadium is able to hold 20,400 people and was built in 1956.

In June 2013, the Stade de l'Aube is the first stadium to build its pitch using the AirFibr hybrid turf technology, developed by the French company Natural Grass.

== See also ==
- List of football stadiums in France
- Lists of stadiums
