= Renaud Ripart =

French footballer (born 1993)

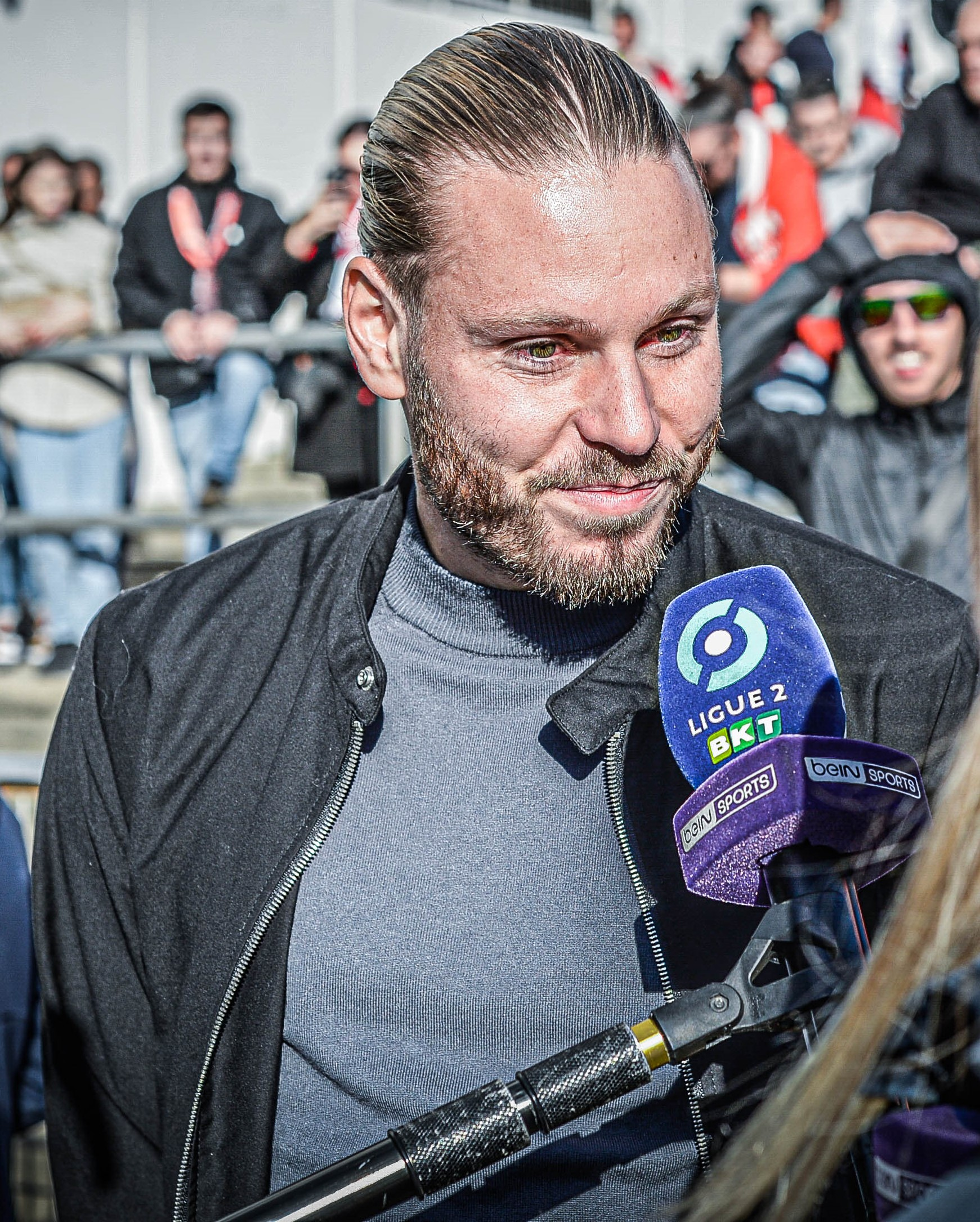
- Ripart with Troyes in 2022

Personal information
- Full name: Renaud Ripart
- Date of birth: 14 March 1993 (age 33)
- Place of birth: Nîmes, France
- Height: 1.81 m (5 ft 11 in)
- Position: Forward

Team information
- Current team: Troyes
- Number: 20

Senior career*
Years	Team	Apps	(Gls)
2011–2021	Nîmes	234	(48)
2012–2015	Nîmes B	42	(14)
2014–2015	→ CA Bastia (loan)	28	(4)
2021–	Troyes	107	(17)
2022–2023	Troyes B	2	(3)
- * Club domestic league appearances and goals as of 11 May 2026

Renaud Ripart (born 14 March 1993) is a French professional footballer who plays as a striker for Ligue 1 club Troyes.

== Club career ==
Ripart made his professional debut in the Coupe de la Ligue against Monaco on 7 August 2012, coming on as a substitute for Romain Thibault.

On 15 July 2021, Ripart joined newly promoted Ligue 1 side Troyes for a fee of €3.3 million. His contract with Troyes expired on 30 June 2025, but he later re-joined the club, signing a new one-year contract.
