= Kandet Diawara =

Guinean footballer (born 2000)

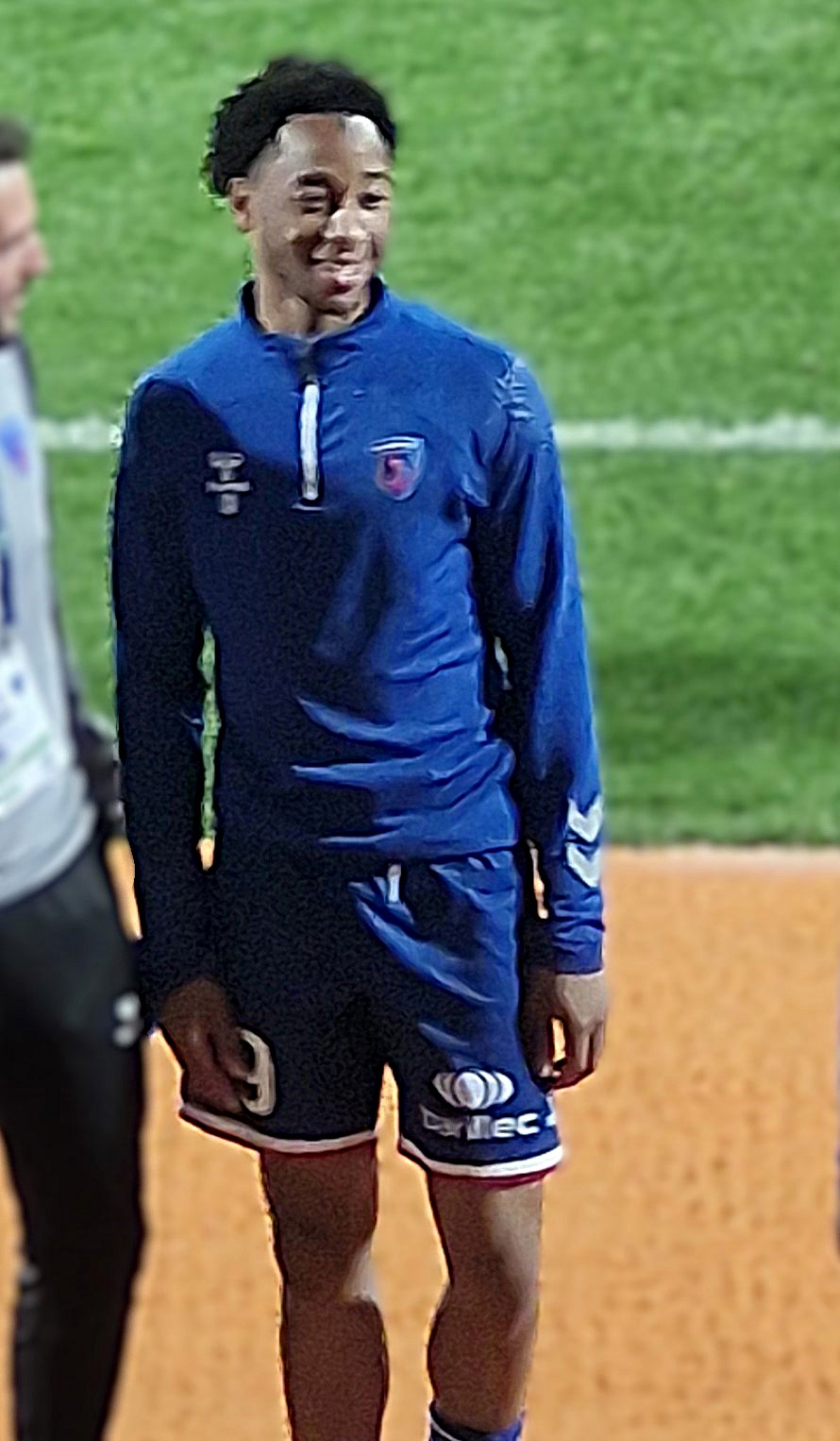
- Diawara in 2024

Personal information
- Date of birth: 10 February 2000 (age 26)
- Place of birth: Lille, France
- Height: 1.77 m (5 ft 10 in)
- Position: Winger

Team information
- Current team: Troyes
- Number: 29

Youth career
- 2009–2010: RC Lille Bois Blancs
- 2010–2012: Iris Club Lambersar
- 2012–2018: Lens

Senior career*
Years	Team	Apps	(Gls)
2018–2020	Lens II	32	(2)
2021	POX FC	0	(0)
2021–2023	APOEL FC	10	(0)
2022–2023	→ Paralimni (loan)	37	(5)
2023–2025	Le Havre	1	(0)
2023–2025	Le Havre B	1	(0)
2024	→ Concarneau (loan)	15	(2)
2024–2025	→ Pau (loan)	29	(4)
2025–2026	1. FC Magdeburg	3	(0)
2025–2026	1. FC Magdeburg II	1	(0)
2026–	Troyes	13	(4)

International career^{‡}
2018	France U18	5	(0)
2024–	Guinea	5	(2)
- * Club domestic league appearances and goals as of 11 May 2026 ‡ National team caps and goals as of 31 December 2025

Kandet Diawara (born 10 February 2000) is a professional footballer who plays as a winger for Ligue 1 club Troyes. Born in France, he plays for the Guinea national team.

== Club career ==
Diawara is a youth product of RC Lille Bois Blancs, Iris Club Lambersar, and Lens. He began his senior career with Lens' reserves in 2018, but was released by them in the summer of 2020 due to issues arising from the COVID-19 pandemic. He joined the Cypriot club POX FC in January 2021, where he also played for their reserves. He was then signed to APOEL FC on 9 August 2021, where he ended up making his professional debut. He joined Enosis Neon Paralimni on loan for the 2022–23 season. On 4 July 2023, he returned to France with newly promoted side Le Havre until 2026.

On 30 January 2024, Diawara was loaned to Concarneau in Ligue 2.

On 7 August 2025, Diawara moved to 1. FC Magdeburg in German 2. Bundesliga.

On 2 February 2026, Diawara returned to France and signed with Troyes in Ligue 2.

== International career ==
Born in France, Diawara is Guinean by descent. He played for the France U18s in 2018 for a friendly competition. In February 2023, he opted to play for the Guinea national team.

== Career statistics ==
=== International ===
List of international goals scored by Kandet Diawara
No.	Date	Venue	Cap	Opponent	Score	Result	Competition
1	21 March 2024	King Abdullah Sports City, Jeddah, Saudi Arabia	1	Vanuatu	2–0	6–0	2024 FIFA Series
2	25 March 2024	King Abdullah Sports City, Jeddah, Saudi Arabia	2	Bermuda	3–1	5–1	2024 FIFA Series

== Personal life ==
Diawara has a twin brother named Mouctar.
