= ES Troyes AC =

French football club

Troyes
- Full name: Espérance Sportive Troyes; Aube Champagne
- Nickname: ESTAC
- Founded: 1 January 1986; 40 years ago
- Stadium: Stade de l'Aube
- Capacity: 20,400
- Owner: City Football Group
- President: Edwin Pindi
- Head coach: Stéphane Dumont
- League: Ligue 1
- 2025–26: Ligue 2, 1st of 18 (promoted)
- Website: www.estac.fr
| Home colours | Away colours | Third colours |

Espérance Sportive Troyes Aube Champagne (ESTAC), commonly known as Troyes, is a French professional association football club based in Troyes. The club competes in Ligue 1, the highest division of French football. It plays its home matches at the Stade de l'Aube. Founded in 1986, it is the third professional club from the city, after AS Troyes-Savinienne and Troyes AF. The club is part of the City Football Group.

== History ==
=== Previous clubs in Troyes (1900–1979) ===
The first ever football club in Troyes was created in 1900, as Union Sportive Troyenne (UST). In 1931, it merged with the AS Savinienne, a club from the suburbs of Troyes, to form the Association Sportive Troyenne et Savinienne (ASTS). The newly formed club became professional in 1935, and joined Ligue 2. The club reached Première Division in 1954–55, under the guidance of manager and former international player Roger Courtois (1952–1963), with players such as Abdelaziz Ben Tifour, Marcel Artelesa or Pierre Flamion. It constituted one of the more glorious times for the club, as they reached the Coupe de France final in 1956, against Sedan, which they went on to lose 3–1. The same day, the youth team of the club won the Coupe Gambardella, the French Youth cup. That very same year, the club failed to keep its place in French top flight, and was back in Division 2. It finally succeed in reaching the Première Division again in 1960, but only lasted one season, and was relegated in 1961. The club had some financial difficulties, and had to leave professional football at the end of the 1962–63 season, which they finished 17th out of 20. They continued for four more seasons at regional level, under the guidance of former ASTS player Jacques Diebold, before disappearing.

Shortly after without any major club in Troyes, a new one was created in 1967, under the name Troyes Omnisports, still at regional level. It renamed itself Troyes Aube Football (TAF) in 1970 as it took back professional status, and was admitted to play in the Third Division. They were promoted to the Second Division after just one year. For their first season in Second division, under the lead of Pierre Flamion, they finished second, but failed to win promotion, as there were three Second division groups that season. They finished first next year, in 1973, and lost in the Champions final between the Champions of the two new groups against Lens. The club had its longest consecutive run in Ligue 1, as they stayed five consecutive seasons in the top flight, from 1973 to 1978. It was however a difficult spell, as it struggled each season against relegation. Pierre Flamion left in 1975, and was replaced by René Cédolin, former Rennes manager. Its best position was 15th out of 20 in 1976–77. Even though they had some very good players, such as striker Gérard Tonnel (1972–1975, 107 games, 69 goals in Ligue 1 and Ligue 2), right-back René Le Lamer (1973–1978), keeper Guy Formici (1970–1978) and Yugoslavian star, winger Ilija Petković (1973–1976). They were finally relegated in 1978, finishing 19th. They suffered back to back relegations finishing 17th in the second division and dropped to the third division. This led to the club becoming bankrupt and merging with Patronage Laïque de Troyes, leaving Troyes without a professional Football Club yet again.

=== Rebuilding (1986–1996) ===
After the death of the second professional club from Troyes, some people tried to rebuild a new club, which could be able to come back to professional status. At first, in 1979, just after the disappearing of the TAF, they merged the amateurs teams the TAF with the Patronage Laïque de Troyes, creating the PL Foot, once again under the guidance of Jacques Diebold. The club only managed to reach the Fourth division in 1984, but became relegated after just one season, finishing 17th. To build a more lasting club, Maurice Cacciaguerra, Angel Masoni and others decided to create the Association Troyes Aube Champagne (ATAC), taking the place of the PL Foot in Division d'Honneur, French sixth division, at regional level.

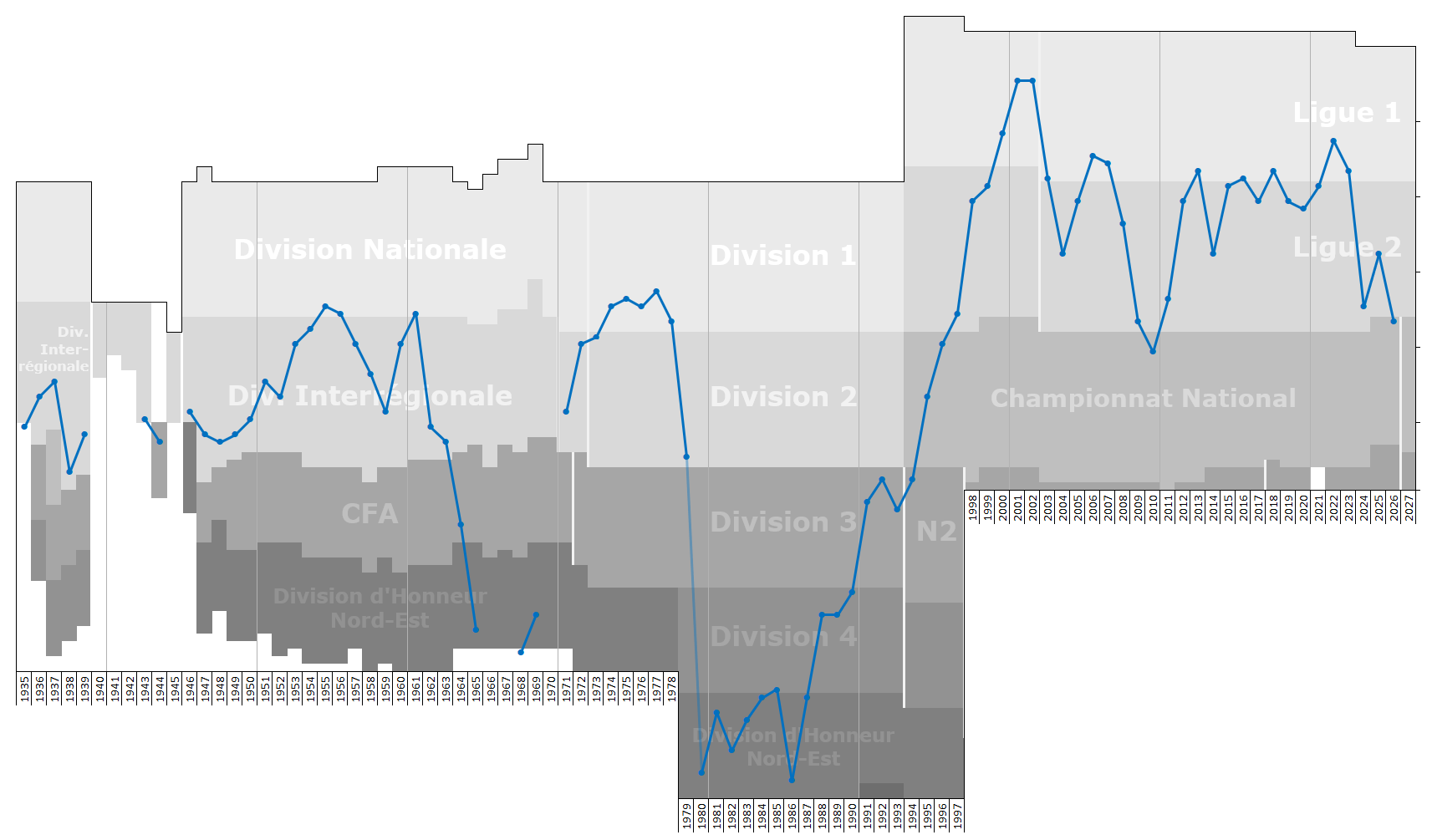
Historical league performance chart of ES Troyes AC

The new club won the championship in its first season, and was promoted to Fourth division in 1987. After just three seasons, they finished first of the Fourth Division in 1990 under manager Jean-Louis Coustillet, and reached the Third Division. Despite being well listed during the next three seasons, the club failed to gain promotion to the Second division. Due to the reform of French football leagues in 1993, the club was transferred to the newly formed Nationale 2, the new fourth level of French football. New president Angel Masoni called Alain Perrin to take the lead of the team. He was to become the most successful manager ever in Troyes, and stayed nine years, from 1993 to 2002. In his first year, he won the Nationale 2, and ATAC was promoted to the Nationale 1 in 1994. The following year, Troyes finished 10th, before finishing 2nd in 1995–96, and was promoted to Ligue 2: for the first time since 1979, Troyes were playing professional football.

=== Rise to Ligue 1 (1996–2003) ===
Troyes first season was very difficult, as they finished 20th out of 22 teams, only keeping its place in Deuxième division due to the bankruptcy of Perpignan and Charleville. The next two seasons were much more successful, they finished fifth in 1997–98 and third in 1998–99, due to the presence of players more used to this level, such as Frédéric Adam, Richard Jeziersky, David Hamed, Samuel Boutal, fan favourite Slađan Đukić and local players, such as captain Mohammed Bradja. Troyes took the lead during the first part of the season. Even if the second part was more difficult, the team finished third, only on goal average, after a last win against Cannes. But most importantly Troyes was promoted to Ligue 1, 21 years after its last season at this level.

In Troyes' first season in Ligue 1 in 1999–2000, the team finished in 14th place, thereby avoiding relegation. At the end of the season, the name ATAC was changed to ESTAC due to the complaints of a French discount supermarket chain having the same name. The glory days came in the next two seasons, as they twice finished seventh, qualifying them for the first time in their history for the Intertoto Cup in 2001 and 2002. In 2001, with players Jérôme Rothen, Rafik Saïfi, Tony Heurtebis, Fabio Celestini and Nicolas Goussé in the side, they defeated Newcastle United in an epic Intertoto Cup second leg final, which finished 4–4 at St James' Park.

=== Decline and instability (2003–2020) ===
After a first round qualification in UEFA Cup over Slovak MFK Ružomberok (6–1; 0–1), Troyes lost to Leeds United 4–5 on aggregate despite winning the second leg 3–2, and failed to qualify to the third round. The following year, they beat Spanish side Villarreal, drawing 0–0 in the first leg and winning the second leg 2–1. However, the result was voided as Troyes fielded a disqualified player, David Vairelles. UEFA disqualified ESTAC, and Villarreal took their place instead. The sacking of new manager Jacky Bonnevay and the nomination of Faruk Hadzibegic in January did not save Troyes. They finished at the bottom of the Ligue 1, and were relegated to Ligue 2.

Thanks to the takeover of new President Thierry Gomez, Troyes avoided bankruptcy to finish 10th the following season. In 2004, Jean-Marc Furlan, who had spectacular results in Coupe de France with amateur side Libourne Saint-Seurin, was appointed manager. In his first season, the club secured promotion by finishing third, largely due to the great performances of two young strikers on loan, Sébastien Grax from Monaco and Bafétimbi Gomis from Saint-Etienne. The club played some attractive football, in the style of former manager Alain Perrin. The club maintained itself in Ligue 1 in 2005–06, but failed the following season (2006–07), finishing in 18th position. Furlan left at the end of the season, and Denis Troch became the new manager. After failing to win promotion, with Troyes taking only four points in the last eleven games of the season and finishing in sixth place, despite being in the top three during the majority of the season, Troch was sacked at the conclusion of the season. Ludovic Batelli was appointed next season, but had to struggle against relegation. He was sacked in April 2009 and caretaker manager, Claude Robin, previously Troyes' director of formation, did not manage to avoid relegation.

With the club finding itself once again in financial difficulties, Thierry Gomez stepped down as president and was replaced by Daniel Masoni, son of former president Angel Masoni. In July 2009, Daniel Masoni engaged Patrick Rémy to replace Robin as manager. Rémy succeeded in taking Troyes back to Ligue 2, finishing third in the Championnat National in 2010. However, after a disagreement with president Masoni, Remy quit in June 2010 and Jean-Marc Furlan returned to manage the club. The club stayed in Ligue 2 in the 2010–11 season, finishing 16th. After a slow start at the beginning of the new season, results improved as the season went on. Things improved greatly and Troyes found themselves challenging for promotion. They achieved this in the 37th game of the season, with a win over AS Monaco, on 11 May 2012. Crucial wins over arch-rivals Sedan, with a goal in the last minute to right back youngster Djibril Sidibé, and then a few weeks later against Clermont, who was third at the time, allowed Troyes to climb into the top three.

Produced most of the football league, with players such as Marcos or Mounir Obbadi, defence by Rincón, Julien Outrebon, Matthieu Saunier and Stephen Drouin with the left back Fabrice N'Sakala and right back Djibril Sidibé, both products of the academy, as well as midfielders Julien Faussurier and captain Eloge Enza Yamissi. They had a strong second half of the season, with 4 defeats, 5 draws and 10 victories (with just one loss in the 10 last games of the season). Troyes found themselves back in Ligue 1 five years after their last stint, and just two season after playing in the third division.

In the 2015–16 Ligue 1 season, Troyes were relegated to Ligue 2 after finishing last on the table winning only three games all year and were humiliated in one match when they lost 9–0 at the hands of Paris Saint-Germain. On 29 May 2017, Troyes were promoted back to Ligue 1 at the first time of asking after defeating Lorient 2–1 on aggregate in the playoff/relegation match. On 20 May 2018, Troyes were relegated back to Ligue 2 after just one season in the top flight, finishing second from bottom.

In the 2018–19 Ligue 2 season, Troyes finished in third place on the table. Troyes would go on to lose the playoff semi final against Lens 2–1 after extra time.

=== City Football Group acquisition ===
On 3 September 2020, City Football Group (CFG), a subsidiary of Abu Dhabi United Group, announced that they had purchased a majority stake in Troyes AC.

In the 2020–21 Ligue 2 season, Troyes were promoted back to Ligue 1 as champions of the division. They were relegated back down following the 2022–23 Ligue 1 season. Troyes suffered a double relegation to the third tier of French football following the 2023–24 Ligue 2 season. However, after end of season, 12th-placed Bordeaux administratively relegated to the Championnat National by the Direction Nationale du Contrôle de Gestion (DNCG) due to financial issues, and Troyes were reinstated.

On 25 April 2026, Troyes secured promotion to Ligue 1 after defeating AS Saint-Étienne 3–0 away, finishing top of the 2025–26 season and returning to the top flight after a three-year absence.

== Players ==
=== Current squad ===
As of 9 September 2026

Note: Flags indicate national team as defined under FIFA eligibility rules; some limited exceptions apply. Players may hold more than one non-FIFA nationality.

| No. | Pos. | Nation | Player |
|---|---|---|---|
| 1 | GK | FRA | Zacharie Boucher |
| 2 | DF | FRA | Lucas Maronnier |
| 3 | DF | FRA | Anis Ouzenadji |
| 4 | DF | CIV | Junior Diaz |
| 5 | DF | ITA | Paolo Gozzi |
| 6 | DF | FRA | Adrien Monfray (captain) |
| 7 | FW | GUI | Kandet Diawara |
| 8 | MF | SEN | Mouhamed Diop |
| 9 | FW | FRA | Jérémy Le Douaron (on loan from Palermo) |
| 10 | MF | FRA | Merwan Ifnaoui |
| 11 | MF | FRA | Iron Gomis |
| 14 | DF | COM | Ismaël Boura |
| 17 | MF | FRA | Antoine Mille |
| 20 | FW | FRA | Renaud Ripart |

| No. | Pos. | Nation | Player |
|---|---|---|---|
| 22 | MF | FRA | Hugo Picard (on loan from Columbus Crew) |
| 23 | FW | FRA | Timothé Nkada (on loan from Standard Liège) |
| 26 | MF | FRA | Alexandre Phliponeau |
| 29 | MF | TOG | Dermane Karim |
| 33 | GK | AUS | Patrick Beach |
| 31 | DF | FRA | Noah Donkor |
| 34 | FW | FRA | Ibrahim Traoré |
| 35 | MF | FRA | Roman Murcy |
| 36 | MF | FRA | Idrissa Soukouna |
| 37 | FW | FRA | Christ Batola |
| 39 | FW | CIV | Yacouba Koné |
| 40 | GK | BFA | Hillel Konaté |
| 41 | DF | FRA | Enisio Carneiro |
| 44 | DF | FRA | Yvann Titi |

=== Out on loan ===
Note: Flags indicate national team as defined under FIFA eligibility rules; some limited exceptions apply. Players may hold more than one non-FIFA nationality.

| No. / Pos. / Nation / Player; — / DF / FRA / Fred Ondoa (at Villefranche until 30 June 2027) | No. / Pos. / Nation / Player; — / FW / NGR / Elijah Odede (at Lommel until 30 June 2027) |

=== Famous past players ===
For a complete list of former Troyes AC players with a Wikipedia article, see here.

== Management ==
| Position | Staff |
|---|---|
| President | Edwin Pindi |
| Vice-president | François Brassier |
| Head coach | Stéphane Dumont |
| Assistant coach | Frédéric Schmidt; Alou Diarra |
| First-team coach | Alain Neuburg |
| Goalkeeping coach | Laurent Kielberg |
| Conditioning Coach | Ismaïla Coulibaly |
| Technical coach | Yacine Benhamid |
| Scout | Mahamadou Cissé; Steve Collier |
| Club doctor | Alphonse Gouroux |
| Physiotherapist | Fabrice Mathiot |
| Osteopath | Sény Diawara |

== Stadium ==
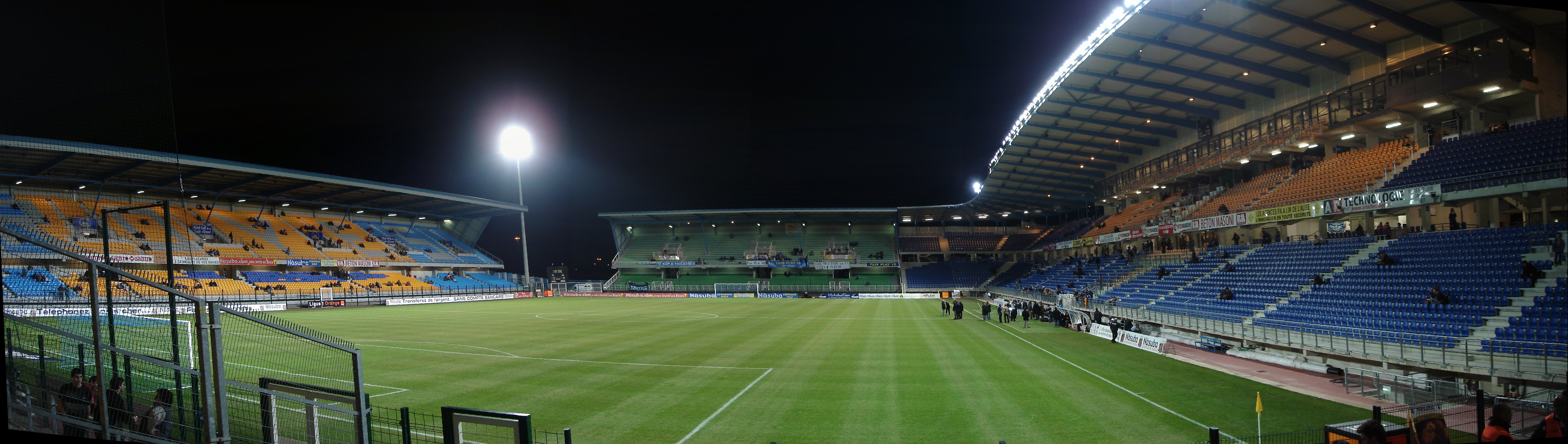
The Stade de l'Aube Stadium

Stade de l'Aube is a multi-use stadium in Troyes, France. It is currently used mostly for football matches, by Troyes AC. The stadium is able to hold 20,400 people and was built in 1956.

In June 2013, the Stade de l'Aube is the first stadium to build its pitch using the AirFibr hybrid turf technology, developed by the French company Natural Grass.

== Honours ==
=== Domestic ===
- Ligue 2:
  - Winners: 2014–15, 2020–21, 2025–26

=== European ===
- UEFA Intertoto Cup:
  - Winners: 2001

== Troyes in European Football ==
| Season | Competition | Round | Club | Home | Away | Aggregate |
|---|---|---|---|---|---|---|
| 2001 | UEFA Intertoto Cup | Second round | (Georgia (country)) WIT Georgia | 6–0 | 1–1 | 7–1 |
| 2001 | UEFA Intertoto Cup | Third round | (Sweden) AIK | 2–1 | 2–1 | 4–2 |
| 2001 | UEFA Intertoto Cup | Semi-Final | (Germany) Wolfsburg | 1–0 | 2–2 | 3–2 |
| 2001 | UEFA Intertoto Cup | Final | (England) Newcastle United | 0-0 | 4–4 | 4–4(a) |
| 2001–02 | UEFA Cup | First round | (Slovakia) Ružomberok | 6–1 | 0–1 | 6–2 |
| 2001–02 | UEFA Cup | Second round | (England) Leeds United | 3–2 | 2–4 | 5–6 |
| 2002 | UEFA Intertoto Cup | Second round | (Northern Ireland) Coleraine | 2–1 | 2–1 | 4–2 |
| 2002 | UEFA Intertoto Cup | Third round | (Netherlands) NAC | 0-0 | 1–1 | 1–1(a) |
| 2002 | UEFA Intertoto Cup | Semi-Final | (Spain) Villarreal | 0–3 | 0–0 | 0–3 |
