= 2025 Coupe de France final =

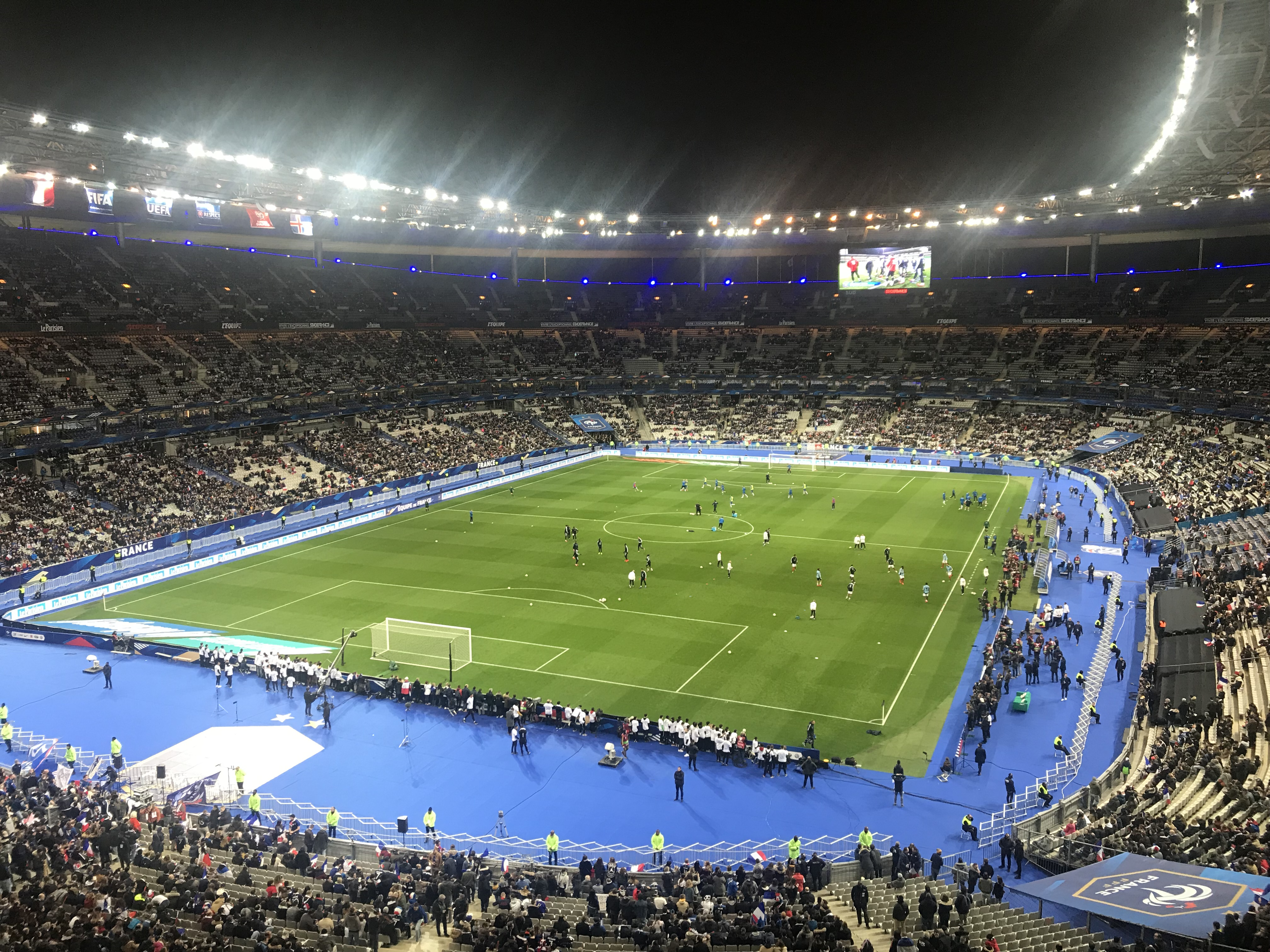
- The Stade de France hosted the final.
- Event: 2024–25 Coupe de France
Paris Saint-Germain	Reims
Ligue 1	Ligue 1
3	0
- Date: 24 May 2025
- Venue: Stade de France, Saint-Denis
- Referee: Benoît Bastien
- Attendance: 77,101

The 2025 Coupe de France final was a football match between Paris Saint-Germain and Reims that decided the winner of the 2024–25 Coupe de France, the 108th season of the Coupe de France. The match was played on 24 May 2025 at the Stade de France in Saint-Denis.

Paris Saint-Germain won the match 3–0 for their record-extending 16th Coupe de France title.

== Background ==
Paris Saint-Germain won the Coupe de France a record 15 times and is trying to repeat as the previous year's champions to extend the record to sixteen and repeat the double. Reims won the Coupe de France twice, last playing in the final in 1977.

== Route to the final ==
Paris Saint-Germain		Round	Reims
Opponent	Result	2024–25 Coupe de France	Opponent	Result
Lens	1–1 (4–3 pen.) (A)	Round of 64	Still-Mutzig	3–1 (A)
Espaly	4–2 (A)	Round of 32	Monaco	1–1 (3–1 pen.) (H)
Le Mans	2–0 (A)	Round of 16	Bourgoin-Jallieu	0–0 (3–2 pen.) (A)
Stade Briochin	7–0 (A)	Quarter-finals	Angers	1–1 (5–3 pen.) (A)
Dunkerque	4–2 (A)	Semi-finals	Cannes	2–1 (A)

Note: H = home fixture, A = away fixture

== Match ==
=== Details ===
24 May 2025
21:00 CEST

Paris Saint-Germain	3–0	Reims
Barcola 16', 19'; Hakimi 43'	Report

Stade de France, Saint-Denis
Attendance: 77,101
Referee: Benoît Bastien

Paris Saint-Germain	Reims

GK	39	(Russia) Matvey Safonov
RB	2	(Morocco) Achraf Hakimi
CB	5	(Brazil) Marquinhos (c)
CB	51	(Ecuador) Willian Pacho	(substituted off) 61'
LB	25	(Portugal) Nuno Mendes	(substituted off) 61'
CM	87	(Portugal) João Neves	(substituted off) 71'
CM	17	(Portugal) Vitinha	(substituted off) 71'
CM	8	(Spain) Fabián Ruiz
RW	14	(France) Désiré Doué	(substituted off) 71'
CF	10	(France) Ousmane Dembélé
LW	29	(France) Bradley Barcola
Substitutes:
GK	1	(Italy) Gianluigi Donnarumma
DF	21	(France) Lucas Hernandez	(substituted on) 61'
DF	35	(Brazil) Lucas Beraldo	(substituted on) 61'
MF	19	(South Korea) Lee Kang-in
MF	24	(France) Senny Mayulu	(substituted on) 71'
MF	33	(France) Warren Zaïre-Emery	(substituted on) 71'
FW	7	(Georgia (country)) Khvicha Kvaratskhelia
FW	9	(Portugal) Gonçalo Ramos	(substituted on) 71'
FW	49	(France) Ibrahim Mbaye
Manager:
(Spain) Luis Enrique

GK	94	(Senegal) Yehvann Diouf (c)
CB	2	(Kenya) Joseph Okumu	(substituted off) 46'
CB	21	(Ivory Coast) Cédric Kipré
CB	24	(Ivory Coast) Mory Gbane
RWB	3	(Japan) Hiroki Sekine
LWB	18	(Spain) Sergio Akieme
RM	7	(Japan) Junya Itō	(substituted off) 46'
CM	6	(France) Valentin Atangana
CM	72	(Ivory Coast) Amadou Koné	(substituted off) 74'
LM	17	(Japan) Keito Nakamura	(substituted off) 63'
CF	12	(United States) Jordan Pefok	(substituted off) 46'
Substitutes:
GK	20	(France) Alexandre Olliero
DF	23	(Portugal) Aurélio Buta
DF	31	(Sweden) Malcolm Jeng
DF	55	(France) Nhoa Sangui
MF	19	(Brazil) Gabriel Moscardo	(substituted on) 46'
MF	30	(Republic of Ireland) John Patrick	(substituted on) 74'
MF	87	(Mali) Ange Martial Tia	(substituted on) 46'
FW	22	(Ivory Coast) Oumar Diakité	(substituted on) 46'
FW	67	(France) Mamadou Diakhon	(substituted on) 63'
Manager:
(Mali) Samba Diawara

Assistant referees:
Hicham Zakrani
Aurélien Berthomieu
Fourth official:
Jérémie Pignard
Video assistant referee:
Nicolas Rainville
Assistant video assistant referee:
Marc Bollengier
Reserve assistant referee:
François Boudikian

Match rules

- 90 minutes
- 30 minutes of extra time if necessary
- Penalty shoot-out if scores still level
- Nine named substitutes
- Maximum of five substitutions, with a sixth allowed in extra time (Note: Each team was given only three opportunities to make substitutions, with a fourth opportunity in extra time, excluding substitutions made at half-time, before the start of extra time and at half-time in extra time.)
