= 2024–25 Stade de Reims season =

Stade de Reims
2024–25 season
- President: Jean-Pierre Caillot
- Manager: Luka Elsner (until 3 February)
- Stadium: Stade Auguste-Delaune
- Ligue 1: 16th
- Coupe de France: Runners-up
- Top goalscorer: League: Keito Nakamura (8); All: Keito Nakamura (9)
- Average home league attendance: 15,659
- All statistics correct as of 26 February 2025.

The 2024–25 season is the 84th season in the history of the Stade de Reims, and it will also be the eighth consecutive season in Ligue 1. In addition to the domestic league, the team is scheduled to participate in the Coupe de France.

== Squad ==
As of 7 September 2024

Note: Flags indicate national team as defined under FIFA eligibility rules; some limited exceptions apply. Players may hold more than one non-FIFA nationality.

No.	Pos.	Nation	Player
2	DF	KEN	Joseph Okumu
4	DF	BEL	Maxime Busi
6	MF	FRA	Valentin Atangana
7	FW	JPN	Junya Itō
9	FW	DEN	Mohamed Daramy
10	MF	MLT	Teddy Teuma
11	FW	FRA	Amine Salama
14	MF	GER	Reda Khadra
15	MF	ZIM	Marshall Munetsi
16	GK	FRA	Ludovic Butelle
17	FW	JPN	Keito Nakamura
18	DF	ESP	Sergio Akieme
19	MF	BRA	Gabriel Moscardo (on loan from Paris Saint-Germain)

No.	Pos.	Nation	Player
20	GK	FRA	Alexandre Olliero
21	DF	CIV	Cédric Kipré
22	FW	CIV	Oumar Diakité
23	DF	POR	Aurélio Buta (on loan from Eintracht Frankfurt)
24	DF	CIV	Emmanuel Agbadou (captain)
25	DF	BEL	Thibault De Smet
55	DF	FRA	Nhoa Sangui
67	FW	FRA	Mamadou Diakhon
71	MF	CIV	Yaya Fofana
72	MF	CIV	Amadou Koné
92	DF	FRA	Abdoul Koné
94	GK	FRA	Yehvann Diouf

== Transfers ==
=== In ===
No.	Pos.	Player	Transferred from	Fee	Date	Source
21	DF	(Ivory Coast) Cédric Kipré	Unattached	Free	27 July 2024	
19	MF	(Brazil) Gabriel Moscardo	(France) Paris Saint-Germain	Loan	21 August 2024	
23	DF	(Portugal) Aurélio Buta	(Germany) Eintracht Frankfurt	Loan (Note: Includes an option to sign permanently for €6 million)	30 August 2024	

=== Out ===
Pos.	Player	Transferred to	Fee	Date	Source
DF	(Morocco) Yunis Abdelhamid	Released (Note: On 5 July 2024, Abdelhamid signed for Saint-Étienne.)	Free	1 July 2024	
MF	(France) Benjamin Stambouli	Released	Free	1 July 2024	
DF	(Guinea) Ibrahim Diakité	(Belgium) Cercle Brugge	€700,000	3 July 2024	
GK	(France) Ewen Jaouen	(France) Dunkerque	Loan	4 July 2024	
DF	(France) Cheick Keita	(Belgium) Charleroi	Undisclosed	4 July 2024	
DF	(Senegal) Fallou Fall	(Norway) Fredrikstad	Loan	10 July 2024	
DF	(Belgium) Thomas Foket	(Belgium) Anderlecht	Free	3 August 2024	
MF	(Morocco) Amir Richardson	(Italy) Fiorentina	€9 million (Note: Up to €1 million in bonuses)	12 August 2024	
DF	(France) Thérence Koudou	(France) Pau	Undisclosed	21 August 2024	
MF	(France) Martin Adeline	(France) Troyes	Undisclosed	30 August 2024	
MF	(Mali) Kamory Doumbia	(France) Brest	€4 million	30 August 2024	
MF	(The Gambia) Adama Bojang	(Switzerland) Grasshopper	Loan	7 September 2024	
DF	(Belgium) Maxime Busi	(Netherlands) NAC Breda	Loan	3 January 2025	

== Friendlies ==
=== Pre-season ===
13 July 2024 Friendly	Reims	2–0	Fleury
16:00 CEST (UTC+2)

18 July 2024 Friendly	Reims	3–1	Sochaux
18:00 CEST (UTC+2)

24 July 2024 Friendly	Júbilo Iwata	1–1	Reims	Japan
19:30

27 July 2024 Friendly	Shimizu S-Pulse	3–0	Reims	Japan
18:30

31 July 2024 Friendly	Machida Zelvia	0–2	Reims	Machida, Japan
19:00		Report		Attendance: Machida GION Stadium

3 August 2024 Friendly	Vissel Kobe	1–0	Reims	Kobe, Japan
19:00		Report		Attendance: Noevir Stadium Kobe

10 August 2024 Friendly	Reims	2–2	Auxerre	Reims, France
16:00 CEST (UTC+2)		Report		Stadium: Stade Auguste-Delaune

10 August 2024 Friendly	Reims	3–1	Auxerre	Reims, France
18:15 CEST (UTC+2)		Report		Stadium: Stade Auguste-Delaune

== Competitions ==
=== Overall record ===
Competition	First match	Last match	Starting round	Final position	Record							
Competition	First match	Last match	Starting round	Final position	Pld	W	D	L	GF	GA	GD	Win %
Ligue 1	17 August 2024	May 2025	Matchday 1		34	8	9	17	33	47	−14	23.53
Coupe de France	21 December 2024	24 May 2025	Round of 64	Runners-up	6	2	3	1	7	7	+0	33.33
Total					40	10	12	18	40	54	−14	25.00

Last updated: 24 May 2025
Source: Competitions

=== Ligue 1 ===
==== League table ====
Pos	Team	Pld	W	D	L	GF	GA	GD	Pts	Qualification or relegation
14	Angers	34	10	6	18	32	53	−21	36	
15	Le Havre	34	10	4	20	40	71	−31	34	
16	Reims (R)	34	8	9	17	33	47	−14	33	Qualification for the relegation play-offs
17	Saint-Étienne (R)	34	8	6	20	39	77	−38	30	Relegation to Ligue 2
18	Montpellier (R)	34	4	4	26	23	79	−56	16	Relegation to Ligue 2

Source: Ligue 1
Rules for classification: 1) Points; 2) Goal difference; 3) Head-to-head points; 4) Head-to-head goal difference; 5) Head-to-head goals scored; 6) Head-to-head away goals scored; 7) Goals scored; 8) Away goals scored; 9) Fair-play points (Note: Head-to-head record is used only after all the matches between the teams in question have been played).
(R) Relegated

==== Results summary ====
Overall								Home						Away					
Pld	W	D	L	GF	GA	GD	Pts	W	D	L	GF	GA	GD	W	D	L	GF	GA	GD
34	8	9	17	34	47	−13	33	4	4	9	17	26	−9	4	5	8	17	21	−4

Last updated: 17 May 2025.
Source: Ligue 1

==== Results by round ====
Round	1	2	3	4	5	6	7	8	9	10	11	12	13	14	15	16	17	18	19	20	21	22	23	24	25	26	27	28	29	30	31	32	33	34
Ground	H	A	H	A	H	A	H	A	H	A	A	H	H	A	H	A	H	H	A	H	A	H	A	A	H	A	H	H	A	H	A	A	H	A
Result	L	D	W	W	D	W	W	L	L	L	W	D	L	D	D	L	L	D	D	L	L	L	L	L	L	D	W	L	W	W	D	L	L	L
Position	15	13	10	6	6	4	4	6	7	8	7	8	9	9	10	11	12	13	12	13	14	14	15	15	15	15	15	16	15	13	13	13	14	16

Updated to match(es) played on 17 May 2025. Source: Ligue 1
A = Away; H = Home; W = Win; D = Draw; L = Loss

==== Matches ====
The league schedule was released on 21 June 2024.

17 August 2024 1	Reims	0–2	Lille	Reims
19:00 CEST (UTC+2)	Am. Koné (red card) 15'; Atangana (yellow card) 46'; Fofana (yellow card) 90+2'	Report	Diakité 45+30'; Ismaily (yellow card) 67'; Mukau (yellow card) 71'; David 90+3'	Stadium: Stade Auguste-Delaune; Attendance: 14,755; Referee: Eric Wattellier

25 August 2024 2	Marseille	2–2	Reims	Marseille
20:45 CEST (UTC+2)	Harit 25'; Greenwood 71'; Merlin (yellow card) 80'	Report	Akieme 51'; Fofana 55'; Diakité (yellow card) 66'	Stadium: Stade Vélodrome; Attendance: 63,841; Referee: Hakim Ben El Hadj

1 September 2024 3	Reims	2–1	Rennes	Reims
17:00 CEST (UTC+2)	Buta (yellow card) 31'; Itō 41'; Diakité 48'; Okumu (yellow card) 90+3'	Report	Østigård 13', (yellow card) 90+7'; Truffert (yellow card) 53'	Stadium: Stade Auguste-Delaune; Attendance: 12,856; Referee: Mathieu Vernice

15 September 2024 4	Nantes	1–2	Reims	Nantes
19:00 CEST (UTC+2)	Pallois (yellow card) 12'; Douglas 28'; Gbamin (yellow card) 89'; Amian (yellow card) 90+1'	Report	Munetsi 34', (yellow card) 69'; Nakamura 90+1'	Stadium: Stade de la Beaujoire; Attendance: 29,811; Referee: Willy Delajod

21 September 2024 5	Reims	1–1	Paris Saint-Germain	Reims
21:00 CEST (UTC+2)				Stadium: Stade Auguste-Delaune; Referee: Jérémie Pignard

29 September 2024 6	Angers	1–3	Reims	Angers
17:00 CEST (UTC+2)				Stadium: Stade Raymond Kopa

6 October 2024 7	Reims	4–2	Montpellier	Reims
				Stadium: Stade Auguste-Delaune

20 October 2024 8	Auxerre	2–1	Reims	Auxerre
17:00	Diomandé 16'; Traorè (yellow card) 23', (goal) 52'; Jubal (penalty missed) 36'; Akpa (yellow card) 90+5'	Report	Atangana (yellow card) 1'; Buta (yellow card) 56'; Nakamura 90+5'; Munetsi (yellow card) 90+5'	Stadium: Stade de l'Abbé-Deschamps; Attendance: 17,016; Referee: Florent Batta

26 October 2024 9	Reims	1–2	Brest	Reims
19:00	Okumu 29'; Fofana (yellow card) 63'; Diakhon (yellow card) 88'; Agbadou (yellow card) 90'	Report	Faivre 4' (pen.); Baldé 18'; Bizot (yellow card) 45+2'; Lees-Melou (yellow card) 65'	Stadium: Stade Auguste-Delaune; Referee: Jérôme Brisard

3 November 2024 10	Toulouse	1–0	Reims	Toulouse
15:00	Aboukhlal 84'	Report	Nakamura (yellow card) 77'; Sangui (yellow card) 81'; Agbadou (yellow card) 86'	Stadium: Stadium de Toulouse; Referee: Mathieu Vernice

10 November 2024 11	Le Havre	0–3	Reims	Le Havre
17:00 CET (UTC+1)	Touré (yellow card) 45+1'	Report	Agbadou (yellow card) 2'; Diakité 15' (yellow card) 32'; Nakamura 21'; Akieme (yellow card) 28'; Ito 57'; Okumu (yellow card) 88'	Stadium: Stade Océane; Attendance: 19,256; Referee: Hakim Ben El Hadj

23 November 2024 12	Reims	1–1	Lyon	Reims
21:00 CET (UTC+1)	Diakité 55'; Koné (yellow card) 64'; Kipré (yellow card) 80'	Report	Cherki 38'	Stadium: Stade Auguste-Delaune; Attendance: 18,274; Referee: Stéphanie Frappart

29 November 2024 13	Reims	0–2	Lens	Reims
20:45 CET (UTC+1)	Atangana (yellow card) 42'	Report	Thomasson 23'; Diouf (yellow card) 32'; Nzola 61'; Labeau Lascary (yellow card) 66'	Stadium: Stade Auguste-Delaune; Attendance: 18,555; Referee: Abdelatif Kherradji

8 December 2024 14	Strasbourg	0–0	Reims	Strasbourg
17:00	Doukouré (yellow card) 36'	Report	Atangana (yellow card) 39'; Kipré (yellow card) 76'	Stadium: Stade de la Meinau; Attendance: 19.369; Referee: Thomas Leonard

14 December 2024 15	Reims	0–0	Monaco	Reims
21:00 CET (UTC+1)	Diouf (yellow card) 84'	Report	Magassa (yellow card) 40'; Ouattara (yellow card) 57'; Golovin (yellow card) 90+4'	Stadium: Stade Auguste Delaune; Attendance: 15,859; Referee: Romain Lissorgue

4 January 2025 16	Saint-Étienne	3–1	Reims	Saint-Étienne
17:00 CET (UTC+1)	Boakye 50', 57' (yellow card) 73'; Stassin 80'; Pétrot (yellow card) 90+2'	Report	Nakamura 42'; Buta (yellow card) 66'	Stadium: Stade Geoffroy-Guichard; Attendance: 14,201; Referee: Stéphanie Frappart

11 January 2025 17	Reims	2–4	Nice	Reims
19:00 CET (UTC+1)	Ito 34'; Munetsi (yellow card) 42'; Akieme (yellow card) 48'; Atangana (yellow card) 65'; Diakhon 71'; Diakité (yellow card) 74'	Report	Guessand 28', (yellow card) 37'; Laborde 44' (pen.), 64'; Diop (yellow card) 68'; Abdi 86'	Stadium: Stade Auguste Delaune; Referee: Willy Delajod

19 January 2025 18	Reims	1–1	Le Havre	Reims
17:15 CET (UTC+1)	Munetsi 26', (yellow card) 76'; Atangana (yellow card) 41'	Report	Sabbi (yellow card) 17'; Sangante 67'; Ndiaye (yellow card) 90+4'	Stadium: Stade Auguste Delaune; Attendance: 11,278; Referee: Mathieu Vernice

25 January 2025 19	Paris Saint-Germain	1–1	Reims	Paris
21:00 CET (UTC+1)	Hernandez (yellow card) 35'; Dembélé 47'; Barcola (yellow card) 90+2'	Report	Akieme (yellow card) 4'; Nakamura 56'; Diakhon (yellow card) 85'	Stadium: Parc des Princes; Attendance: 47,862; Referee: Hakim Ben El Hadj

2 February 2025 20	Reims	1–2	Nantes	Reims
17:15 CET (UTC+1)	Castelletto 45+1' (o.g.); Sangui (yellow card) 80'; Kipré (yellow card) 90+3'; Okumu (yellow card) 90+4', (red card) 90+4'	Report	Abline 42'; Mohamed 70', (yellow card) 71'; Lepenant (yellow card) 80'; Pallois (yellow card) 89'	Stadium: Stade Auguste-Delaune; Attendance: 12,712; Referee: Benoît Millot

9 February 2025 21	Lyon	4–0	Reims	Décines-Charpieu
15:00 CET (UTC+1)	Mata (yellow card) 31'; Tagliafico 36', (yellow card) 58'; Tolisso 68'; Cherki 79'; Mikautadze 90+3'	Report	Diakité (yellow card) 11'; Sangui (yellow card) 67'; Zabi (red card) 87'	Stadium: Parc Olympique Lyonnais; Attendance: 43,489; Referee: François Letexier

16 February 2025 22	Reims	0–1	Angers	Reims
17:15 CET (UTC+1)	Gbane (yellow card) 32'; Buta (yellow card) 41'	Report	El Melali 45+1'; Aholou (yellow card) 63'	Stadium: Stade Auguste-Delaune; Attendance: 11,868; Referee: Florent Batta

21 February 2025 23	Rennes	1–0	Reims	Rennes
20:45 CET (UTC+1)	Kalimuendo 10' (pen.); Cissé (yellow card) 38'	Report	Kipré (red card) 5'; Ibrahim (yellow card) 79' (yellow-red card) 89'	Stadium: Roazhon Park; Attendance: 26,818; Referee: Marc Bollengier

28 February 2025 24	Monaco	3–0	Reims	Monaco
20:45 CET (UTC+1)	Biereth 34', 39', 51'	Report		Stadium: Stade Louis II; Attendance: 5,517; Referee: Eric Wattellier

9 March 2025 25	Reims	0–2	Auxerre	Reims
18:15 CET (UTC+1)	Akieme (yellow card) 67'	Report	Bair 15'; Traorè 24', (yellow card) 31'	Stadium: Stade Auguste-Delaune; Attendance: 15,474; Referee: Romain Lissorgue

16 March 2025 26	Brest	0–0	Reims	Brest
17:15 CET (UTC+1)	Doumbia (yellow card) 76'; Haïdara (red card) 90+1'	Report	Nakamura (yellow card) 3'; Atangana (yellow card) 19'; Sekine (yellow card) 85'	Stadium: Stade Francis-Le Blé; Attendance: 14,517; Referee: Jérôme Brisard

29 March 2025 27	Reims	3–1	Marseille	Reims
17:00 CET (UTC+1)	Nakamura 29'; Diakhon 51'; Atangana 68'	Report	Rongier 78'	Stadium: Stade Auguste-Delaune; Attendance: 20,213; Referee: Willy Delajod

6 April 2024 28	Reims	0–1	Strasbourg	Reims
17:15 CEST (UTC+2)	Koné (yellow card) 43'; Ito (yellow card) 90+7'; Gbane (red card) 90+8'	Report	Doukouré 4'; Bakwa (yellow card) 60'; Santos (yellow card) 84'; Moreira (red card) 90+8'	Stadium: Stade Auguste-Delaune; Attendance: 16,254; Referee: Clément Turpin

11 April 2024 29	Lens	0–2	Reims	Lens
20:45 CEST (UTC+2)	Medina (yellow card) 81'	Report	Nakamura 33', 88'	Stadium: Stade Bollaert-Delelis; Attendance: 38,157; Referee: François Letexier

20 April 2024 30	Reims	1–0	Toulouse	Reims
17:15 CEST (UTC+2)	Pefok 39'; Moscardo (yellow card) 74'	Report	Mckenzie (red card) 27'	Stadium: Stade Auguste-Delaune; Attendance: 14,908; Referee: Marc Bollengier

27 April 2025 31	Montpellier	0–0	Reims	Montpellier
17:15 CET (UTC+1)	Fayad (yellow card) 37'; Mouanga (yellow card) 41'; Coulibaly (yellow card) 90'	Report	Kipré (yellow card) 45+1'; Akieme (yellow card) 68'; Nakamura (yellow card) 90+3'	Stadium: Stade de la Mosson; Attendance: 10,806; Referee: Jérémie Pignard

2 May 2025 32	Nice	1–0	Reims	Nice
20:45 CEST (UTC+2)	Rosario (yellow card) 6'; Sanson 15'; Mendy (yellow card) 41'	Report	Gbane (yellow card) 62'; Nakamura (yellow card) 72'	Stadium: Allianz Riviera; Attendance: 24,758; Referee: Abdelatif Kherradji

10 May 2025 33	Reims	0–2	Saint-Étienne	Reims
21:00 CEST (UTC+2)	Koné (yellow card) 52'	Report	Tardieu 3'; Cardona 41'	Stadium: Stade Auguste-Delaune; Attendance: 18,630; Referee: Éric Wattellier

17 May 2025 34	Lille	2–1	Reims	Villeneuve-d'Ascq
21:00 CEST (UTC+2)	Cabella 37'; Akpom 86' (pen.)	Report	Akieme 60'; Okumu (yellow card) 84'	Stadium: Stade Pierre-Mauroy; Attendance: 45,599; Referee: Willy Delajod

==== Promotion/relegation play-offs ====
21 May 2025 1	Metz	1–1	Reims	Longeville-lès-Metz
20:00 CEST (UTC+2)	Udol 38'	Report	Kipré 52'	Stadium: Stade Saint-Symphorien; Attendance: 28,000; Referee: Hakim Ben El Hadj

29 May 2025 2	Reims	1–3 (a.e.t.) (2-4 agg.)	Metz	Reims
20:30 CEST (UTC+2)	Tia 57'	Report	Udol 78'; Touré 110'; Hein 114'	Stadium: Stade Auguste-Delaune; Attendance: 20,392; Referee: Eric Wattellier

=== Coupe de France ===
22 December 2024 Round of 64	Still-Mutzig	1–3	Reims	Molsheim
14:45 CET (UTC+1)	Schall 60'	Report	Gabriel Moscardo 8'; Diakhon 66'; Sangui 76'	Stadium: Stade Parc des Sports; Attendance: 2,315; Referee: Pierre Gaillouste

14 January 2025 Round of 32	Reims	1–1 (3–1 p)	Monaco	Reims
20:45 CET (UTC+1)	Kipré 45'; Diakité (yellow card) 86'	Report	Salisu 70'; Embolo (yellow card) 83'	Stadium: Stade Auguste-Delaune; Attendance: 10,665; Referee: Gaël Angoula
	Penalties
	Nakamura (penalty scored); Salama (penalty scored); Kipré (penalty missed); Diakité (penalty scored)		(penalty missed) Caio Henrique; (penalty missed) Biereth; (penalty missed) Camara; (penalty scored) Embolo

6 February 2025 Round of 16	Bourgoin-Jallieu	0–0 (2–3 p)	Reims	Bourgoin-Jallieu
21:00 CET (UTC+1)		Report		Stadium: Stade Pierre Rajon; Attendance: 6,419; Referee: Olivier Thual
	Penalties
	Bozkurt (penalty scored); Mendy (penalty missed); Norde (penalty missed); Ben Amar (penalty missed); Atik (penalty scored)		(penalty missed) Diakité; (penalty scored) Buta; (penalty scored) Sangui; (penalty missed) Itō; (penalty scored) Akieme

25 February 2025 Quarter-finals	Angers	1–1 (3–5 p)	Reims	Angers
21:00 CET (UTC+1)	Dieng 90+5'	Report	Nakamura 79'	Stadium: Stade Raymond Kopa; Attendance: 13,000; Referee: Mathieu Vernice
	Penalties
	Dieng (penalty scored); Niane (penalty missed); Ferhat (penalty scored); Raolisoa (penalty scored)		(penalty scored) Nakamura; (penalty scored) Gabriel Moscardo; (penalty scored) Sangui; (penalty scored) Itō; (penalty scored) Diakité

2 April 2025 Semi-finals	Cannes	1–2	Reims	Cannes
21:00 CEST	N'Doye (yellow card) 35', (goal) 52'; Vinci (yellow card) 39'	Report	Ibrahim 14'; Teuma 58'; Gbane (yellow card) 74'	Stadium: Stade Pierre de Coubertin; Attendance: 9,000; Referee: Eric Wattellier

24 May 2025 Final	Paris Saint-Germain	3–0	Reims	Saint-Denis
21:00 CEST (UTC+2)	Barcola 16', 19'; Hakimi 43'	Report		Stadium: Stade de France; Attendance: 77,101; Referee: Benoît Bastien
