= 2023–24 Stade de Reims season =

Stade de Reims
2023–24 season
- President: Jean-Pierre Caillot
- Head coach: Will Still (until 2 May); Samba Diawara (caretaker, from 3 May)
- Stadium: Stade Auguste-Delaune
- Ligue 1: 9th
- Coupe de France: Round of 32
- Top goalscorer: League: Teddy Teuma (6); All: Teddy Teuma (6)
- Average home league attendance: 15,669
Home colours	Away colours	Third colours

The 2023–24 season was Stade de Reims's 93rd season in existence and sixth consecutive season in Ligue 1. They also competed in the Coupe de France.

== Players ==
=== First-team squad ===
As of 15 February 2024

Note: Flags indicate national team as defined under FIFA eligibility rules; some limited exceptions apply. Players may hold more than one non-FIFA nationality.

No.	Pos.	Nation	Player
2	DF	KEN	Joseph Okumu
4	DF	BEL	Maxime Busi
5	DF	MAR	Yunis Abdelhamid (captain)
6	MF	FRA	Valentin Atangana
7	FW	JPN	Junya Itō
8	MF	MAR	Amir Richardson
9	FW	DEN	Mohamed Daramy
10	MF	MLT	Teddy Teuma
14	MF	GER	Reda Khadra
15	MF	ZIM	Marshall Munetsi
16	GK	FRA	Ludovic Butelle

No.	Pos.	Nation	Player
17	FW	JPN	Keito Nakamura
18	DF	ESP	Sergio Akieme
22	FW	CIV	Oumar Diakité
24	DF	CIV	Emmanuel Agbadou
25	DF	BEL	Thibault De Smet
26	MF	FRA	Benjamin Stambouli
27	FW	GAM	Adama Bojang
32	DF	BEL	Thomas Foket
45	DF	FRA	Thérence Koudou
94	GK	FRA	Yehvann Diouf
96	GK	FRA	Alexandre Olliero

=== Out on loan ===
Note: Flags indicate national team as defined under FIFA eligibility rules; some limited exceptions apply. Players may hold more than one non-FIFA nationality.

No.	Pos.	Nation	Player
—	DF	ECU	Maiky de la Cruz (on loan to Union Titus Pétange)
—	DF	GUI	Ibrahim Diakité (on loan to Stade Lausanne Ouchy)
—	DF	USA	Kobi Henry (on loan to Villefranche)
—	DF	FRA	Cheick Keita (on loan to Bastia)

No.	Pos.	Nation	Player
—	MF	FRA	Martin Adeline (on loan to Annecy)
—	MF	MLI	Kamory Doumbia (on loan to Brest)
—	FW	FRA	Amine Salama (on loan to Caen)
—	FW	AUS	Mohamed Touré (on loan to Paris FC)

== Transfers ==
=== In ===
Pos.	Player	Transferred from	Fee	Date	Source
MF	(Malta) Teddy Teuma	(Belgium) Union Saint-Gilloise	€3,600,000	7 July 2023	
MF	(Germany) Reda Khadra	(England) Brighton & Hove Albion	€1,900,000	21 July 2023	
MF	(Japan) Keito Nakamura	(Austria) LASK	€12,000,000	10 August 2023	

=== Out ===
Pos.	Player	Transferred to	Fee	Date	Source
FW	(France) Hugo Ekitike	(France) Paris Saint-Germain	€28,500,000	1 July 2023	
FW	(Scotland) Fraser Hornby	(Germany) Darmstadt 98	€1,800,000	5 July 2023	
MF	(Algeria) Ilan Kebbal	(France) Paris FC	€2,000,000	10 July 2023	
FW	(Greece) Anastasios Donis	(Cyprus) APOEL	Undisclosed	19 July 2023	
DF	(France) Moustapha Mbow	(France) Paris FC	Undisclosed	20 July 2023	
DF	(Guadeloupe) Andreaw Gravillon	(Turkey) Adana Demirspor	Undisclosed	24 July 2023	
MF	(France) Bradley Locko	(France) Brest	€500,000	27 July 2023	
MF	(Sweden) Jens Cajuste	(Italy) Napoli	€12,000,000	10 August 2023	

== Pre-season and friendlies ==
Win Draw Loss Fixtures

19 July 2023 Friendly	Reims	3–1	Charleroi	Bétheny
17:00 CEST (UTC+2)	Diakité 21'; Munetsi 34'; Sekongo 72'		Maggiotti 90' (pen.)	Stadium: Stade Louis Blériot N°1

22 July 2023 Friendly	Reims	3–2	Amiens	Épernay
17:00 CEST (UTC+2)				Stadium: Stade Paul Chandon

26 July 2023 Friendly	Getafe	0–1	Reims	Orihuela Costa, Spain
20:00 CEST (UTC+2)				Stadium: Real Club de Golf Campoamor Campo 1

29 July 2023 Friendly	Zaragoza	1–2	Reims	San Pedro del Pinatar, Spain
20:00 CEST (UTC+2)				Stadium: Pinatar Arena Football Center

6 August 2023 Friendly	Reims	2–1	Torino	Reims
17:00 CEST (UTC+2)				Stadium: Stade Auguste-Delaune

== Competitions ==
=== Overall record ===
Competition	First match	Last match	Starting round	Final position	Record							
Competition	First match	Last match	Starting round	Final position	Pld	W	D	L	GF	GA	GD	Win %
Ligue 1	12 August 2023	19 May 2024	Matchday 1	9th	34	13	8	13	42	47	−5	38.24
Coupe de France	7 January 2024	21 January 2024	Round of 64	Round of 32	2	1	1	0	5	2	+3	50.00
Total					36	14	9	13	47	49	−2	38.89

Source: Soccerway

=== Ligue 1 ===
==== League table ====
Pos	Team	Pld	W	D	L	GF	GA	GD	Pts	Qualification or relegation
7	Lens	34	14	9	11	45	37	+8	51	Qualification for the Conference League play-off round
8	Marseille	34	13	11	10	52	41	+11	50	
9	Reims	34	13	8	13	42	47	−5	47	
10	Rennes	34	12	10	12	53	46	+7	46	
11	Toulouse	34	11	10	13	42	46	−4	43	

Source: Ligue 1
Rules for classification: 1) Points; 2) Goal difference; 3) Head-to-head points; 4) Head-to-head goal difference; 5) Head-to-head goals scored; 6) Head-to-head away goals scored; 7) Goals scored; 8) Away goals scored; 9) Fair-play points (Note: Head-to-head record is used only after all the matches between the teams in question have been played).

==== Results summary ====
Overall								Home						Away					
Pld	W	D	L	GF	GA	GD	Pts	W	D	L	GF	GA	GD	W	D	L	GF	GA	GD
34	13	8	13	42	47	−5	47	8	3	6	19	18	+1	5	5	7	23	29	−6

Source: Ligue 1

==== Results by round ====
Round	1	2	3	4	5	6	7	8	9	10	11	12	13	14	15	16	17	18	19	20	21	22	23	24	25	26	27	28	29	30	31	32	33	34
Ground	A	H	A	A	H	A	H	H	A	H	A	H	A	H	A	A	H	A	H	H	A	H	A	H	A	H	A	H	A	H	A	H	A	H
Result	L	W	W	D	L	W	W	L	D	W	W	L	L	W	L	L	W	W	D	L	L	D	W	L	D	W	D	D	L	L	L	W	D	W
Position	15	8	3	4	9	5	3	5	6	5	4	5	5	5	8	8	8	6	6	7	9	8	8	9	9	9	9	7	8	10	11	12	11	9

Source: Ligue 1
A = Away; H = Home; W = Win; D = Draw; L = Loss

==== Matches ====
The league fixtures were unveiled on 29 June 2023.

12 August 2023 1	Marseille	2–1	Reims	Marseille
17:00 CEST (UTC+2)	Ounahi 23'; Lodi (yellow card) 59'; Vitinha 73'	Report	Itō 10'; Munetsi (yellow card) 36'; Wilson-Esbrand (yellow card) 45+3'; Richardson (yellow card) 57'	Stadium: Stade Vélodrome; Attendance: 63,787; Referee: Eric Wattellier

20 August 2023 2	Reims	2–0	Clermont	Reims
15:00 CEST (UTC+2)	Munetsi 17'; Daramy 84'	Report		Stadium: Stade Auguste-Delaune; Attendance: 12,887; Referee: Romain Lissorgue

27 August 2023 3	Montpellier	1–3	Reims	Montpellier
15:00 CEST (UTC+2)	Al-Taamari 45+4'; Chotard (yellow card) 63'	Report	Abdelhamid 9'; Teuma 41', 56'; O. Diakité (penalty missed) 64'; Foket (yellow card) 72'	Stadium: Stade de la Mosson; Attendance: 14,476; Referee: Marc Bollengier

3 September 2023 4	Metz	2–2	Reims	Metz
15:00 CEST (UTC+2)	Sabaly 6'; Jallow 63'	Report	O. Diakité 17', (yellow card) 90'; Teuma (yellow card) 25'; Foket (yellow card) 45+2', (goal) 52'; Richardson (yellow card) 80'	Stadium: Stade Saint-Symphorien; Attendance: 24,272; Referee: Mathieu Vernice

17 September 2023 5	Reims	1–2	Brest	Reims
15:00 CEST (UTC+2)	Richardson 19'; Matusiwa (yellow card) 22'; De Smet (yellow card) 52'	Report	Lala (yellow card) 18'; Magnetti (yellow card) 36'; Camara 50'; Lees-Melou 56'; Mounié (yellow card) 88'; Bizot (yellow card) 90+2'	Stadium: Stade Auguste-Delaune; Attendance: 12,948; Referee: Gaël Angoula

26 September 2023 6	Lille	1–2	Reims	Villeneuve-d'Ascq
21:00 CEST (UTC+2)	Santos (yellow card) 62'; André 78'	Report	Daramy 12'; Nakamura 16', (yellow card) 53'; Foket (yellow card) 65'	Stadium: Stade Pierre-Mauroy; Attendance: 33,075; Referee: Eric Wattellier

1 October 2023 7	Reims	2–0	Lyon	Reims
13:00 CEST (UTC+2)	Abdelhamid (yellow card) 37', (goal) 71'; Munetsi 45+1'; Teuma (yellow card) 60'	Report	Alvero (yellow card) 35'; Caqueret (yellow card) 52'	Stadium: Stade Auguste-Delaune; Attendance: 16,477; Referee: François Letexier

7 October 2023 8	Reims	1–3	Monaco	Reims
21:00 CEST (UTC+2)	Teuma 57' (pen.)	Report	Jakobs 42'; Balogun 46'; Ben Yedder 49'; Zakaria (yellow card) 83'; Matsima (yellow card) 84'; Diatta (yellow card) 90+5'	Stadium: Stade Auguste-Delaune; Attendance: 19,000; Referee: Hakim Ben El Hadj

22 October 2023 9	Toulouse	1–1	Reims	Toulouse
15:00 CEST (UTC+2)	Dallinga 53'; Costa (yellow card) 59'; Dønnum (yellow card) 62'	Report	Richardson 48'	Stadium: Stadium de Toulouse; Attendance: 23,795; Referee: Jérémy Stinat

28 October 2023 10	Reims	1–0	Lorient	Reims
17:00 CEST (UTC+2)	Teuma (yellow card) 37'; Wilson-Esbrand 84'	Report	Yongwa (yellow card) 61'; Bakayoko (yellow card) 65'; Mvogo (yellow card) 80'	Stadium: Stade Auguste-Delaune; Attendance: 14,033; Referee: Benoît Bastien

5 November 2023 11	Nantes	0–1	Reims	Nantes
15:00 CET (UTC+1)	Pierre-Gabriel (yellow card) 90+6'	Report	Foket (yellow card) 53'; Busi (yellow card) 71'; Itō 75'	Stadium: Stade de la Beaujoire; Attendance: 33,621; Referee: Gaël Angoula

11 November 2023 12	Reims	0–3	Paris Saint-Germain	Reims
17:00 CET (UTC+1)	Abdelhamid (yellow card) 51'	Report	Mbappé 3', 59', 82'	Stadium: Stade Auguste-Delaune; Attendance: 20,500; Referee: Willy Delajod

26 November 2023 13	Rennes	3–1	Reims	Rennes
17:05 CET (UTC+1)	Gouiri 4'; Bourigeaud 46'; Theate 66'; Matić (yellow card) 70'; Kalimuendo (yellow card) 78'	Report	O. Diakité 45+1'; Agbadou (yellow card) 85'; Teuma (yellow card) 90'	Stadium: Roazhon Park; Attendance: 27,718; Referee: Ruddy Buquet

1 December 2023 14	Reims	2–1	Strasbourg	Reims
21:00 CET (UTC+1)	Richardson 10'; Perrin 42' (o.g.); De Smet (yellow card) 86'	Report	Gameiro 88' (pen.); Sylla (yellow card) 90+3'	Stadium: Stade Auguste-Delaune; Attendance: 13,704; Referee: Hakim Ben El Hadj

10 December 2023 15	Nice	2–1	Reims	Nice
13:00 CET (UTC+1)	Laborde 55'; Boga 82'; Ndayishimiye (yellow card) 84'; Bard (yellow card) 86'	Report	Foket (yellow card) 62'; Abdelhamid 78', (yellow card) 84'; Matusiwa (yellow card) 86'	Stadium: Allianz Riviera; Attendance: 24,325; Referee: Benoît Bastien

16 December 2023 16	Lens	2–0	Reims	Lens
21:00 CET (UTC+1)	Saïd 43'; Cortés 75'	Report	Matusiwa (yellow card) 21'	Stadium: Stade Bollaert-Delelis; Attendance: 38,055; Referee: François Letexier

20 December 2023 17	Reims	1–0	Le Havre	Reims
21:00 CET (UTC+1)	Nakamura 25'; Foket (yellow card) 86'	Report	Ndiaye (red card) 21'; Casimir (yellow card) 54'	Stadium: Stade Auguste-Delaune; Attendance: 14,835; Referee: Stéphanie Frappart

13 January 2024 18	Monaco	1–3	Reims	Monaco
17:00 CET (UTC+1)	Magassa (yellow card) 34'; Ben Yedder 49', (yellow card) 90+2'; Vanderson (yellow card) 82'	Report	Teuma 35'; Khadra 55'; De Smet (yellow card) 62'; Okumu (yellow card) 80'; Matusiwa 90+5'	Stadium: Stade Louis II; Attendance: 4,231; Referee: François Letexier

28 January 2024 19	Reims	0–0	Nantes	Reims
15:00 CET (UTC+1)	Foket (yellow card) 58'; Koudou (yellow card) 72'; Munetsi (yellow card) 81'	Report	Kadewere (penalty missed) 73'; Douglas Augusto (yellow card) 87'; Sissoko (yellow card) 90'	Stadium: Stade Auguste-Delaune; Attendance: 14,388; Referee: Jérémie Pignard

4 February 2024 20	Reims	2–3	Toulouse	Reims
15:00 CET (UTC+1)	Stambouli (yellow card) 21'; De Smet (yellow card) 24'; Teuma 49'; Akieme 90+1'	Report	Mawissa 12'; Schmidt (yellow card) 18'; Babicka 31'; Dallinga 45+2' (pen.); Nicolaisen (yellow card) 55'; Suazo (yellow card) 87'	Stadium: Stade Auguste-Delaune; Attendance: 12,817; Referee: Pierre Gaillouste

11 February 2024 21	Lorient	2–0	Reims	Lorient
15:00 CET (UTC+1)	Abergel (yellow card) 31'; Bamba 70'; Bakayoko 87'	Report	Stambouli (yellow card) 41'	Stadium: Stade du Moustoir; Attendance: 15,096; Referee: Marc Bollengier

18 February 2024 22	Reims	1–1	Lens	Reims
17:05 CET (UTC+1)	Diakité (yellow card) 22', (goal) 42'; Okumu (yellow card) 52'	Report	Khusanov (yellow card) 19'; Saïd 45+1'; Medina (yellow card) 67'	Stadium: Stade Auguste-Delaune; Attendance: 20,116; Referee: Benoît Millot

25 February 2024 23	Le Havre	1–2	Reims	Le Havre
15:00 CET (UTC+1)	Négo (yellow card) 74'; Touré 74' (pen.); Sangante (yellow card) 90+4'; Gorgelin (yellow card) 90+5'	Report	Foket (yellow card) 24' (yellow-red card) 67'; Daramy 64', 90+4' (pen.); De Smet (yellow card) 73'	Stadium: Stade Océane; Attendance: 22,046; Referee: Florent Batta

2 March 2024 24	Reims	0–1	Lille	Reims
17:00 CET (UTC+1)	Koudou (yellow card) 6'; Teuma (yellow card) 36'; De Smet (yellow card) 59'	Report	Gudmundsson (yellow card) 48'; David 56'; Chevalier (yellow card) 90+6'	Stadium: Stade Auguste-Delaune; Attendance: 16,452; Referee: Jérémy Stinat

10 March 2024 25	Paris Saint-Germain	2–2	Reims	Paris
13:00 CET (UTC+1)	Abdelhamid 17' (o.g.); Ramos 19'; Ugarte (yellow card) 42'; Hakimi (yellow card) 54'	Report	Munetsi 7'; De Smet (yellow card) 39'; Diakité 45'; Itō (yellow card) 79'	Stadium: Parc des Princes; Attendance: 47,917; Referee: Willy Delajod

17 March 2024 26	Reims	2–1	Metz	Reims
15:00 CET (UTC+1)	Diakité 3', (yellow card) 82'; Itō (yellow card) 21', (goal) 79'; Abdelhamid (yellow card) 51'; Munetsi (yellow card) 73'	Report	Atta 14'; Hérelle (yellow card) 20'; Sabaly (yellow card) 42'; Oukidja (yellow card) 82'; I. Sané (yellow card) 90+1'	Stadium: Stade Auguste-Delaune; Attendance: 14,335; Referee: Hakim Ben El Hadj

30 March 2024 27	Lyon	1–1	Reims	Décines-Charpieu
21:00 CET (UTC+1)	Nuamah 65'; Ćaleta-Car (yellow card) 71'; Tolisso (yellow card) 76'	Report	Khadra (yellow card) 20'; Okumu 55'; Richardson (yellow card) 78'; Munetsi (yellow card) 90'	Stadium: Parc Olympique Lyonnais; Attendance: 43,097; Referee: Thomas Léonard

7 April 2024 28	Reims	0–0	Nice	Reims
15:00 CEST (UTC+2)	Akieme (yellow card) 12'; Okumu (yellow card) 40'	Report	Boudaoui (yellow card) 50'	Stadium: Stade Auguste-Delaune; Attendance: 14,606; Referee: Eric Wattellier

13 April 2024 29	Strasbourg	3–1	Reims	Strasbourg
17:00 CEST (UTC+2)	Sissoko (yellow card) 28'; Gameiro 44' (pen.); Sylla 50'; Sahi 90+3'	Report	Nakamura 8'; A. Koné (yellow card) 28' (yellow-red card) 45+7'; Richardson (yellow card) 79'	Stadium: Stade de la Meinau; Attendance: 25,436; Referee: Willy Delajod

21 April 2024 30	Reims	1–2	Montpellier	Reims
15:00 CEST (UTC+2)	Abdelhamid (yellow card) 42'; Munetsi (yellow card) 49'; Agbadou 66'; Bojang (yellow card) 90+2'	Report	Sagnan 26', (yellow card) 69'; Sylla (yellow card) 47'; Khazri (yellow card) 82'; Al-Tamari 87'	Stadium: Stade Auguste-Delaune; Attendance: 14,183; Referee: Pierre Gaillouste

28 April 2024 31	Clermont	4–1	Reims	Clermont-Ferrand
15:00 CEST (UTC+2)	Cham 31' (pen.), 56' (pen.); Rashani 79', 90'	Report	Nakamura 33'; Koudou (yellow card) 54'; A. Koné (yellow card) 59'; Teuma (yellow card) 60'; De Smet (red card) 77'	Stadium: Stade Gabriel Montpied; Attendance: 8,713; Referee: Florent Batta

10 May 2024 33	Brest	1–1	Reims	Brest
21:00 CEST (UTC+2)	Brassier 45+2', (yellow card) 73'; Magnetti (yellow card) 90+5'	Report	A. Koné (yellow card) 9'; Munetsi 25'; K. Koné (yellow card) 45+2'; Stambouli (yellow card) 62'	Stadium: Stade Francis-Le Blé; Attendance: 14,623; Referee: Jérôme Brisard

15 May 2024 32	Reims	1–0	Marseille	Reims
21:00 CEST (UTC+2)	Diakité (yellow card) 18'; Stambouli (yellow card) 31'; Mbemba 33' (o.g.); Teuma (yellow card) 65'	Report	Kondogbia (yellow card) 55'	Stadium: Stade Auguste-Delaune; Attendance: 19,020; Referee: Hakim Ben El Hadj
Note: The match was originally scheduled for 5 May 2024, but was postponed due to Marseille's progression in the UEFA Europa League.

19 May 2024 34	Reims	2–1	Rennes	Reims
21:00 CEST (UTC+2)	Abdelhamid 48' (pen.); Akieme 80', (yellow card) 85'	Report	Truffert (yellow card) 85'; Rieder 90+4'	Stadium: Stade Auguste-Delaune; Attendance: 16,077; Referee: Mathieu Vernice

=== Coupe de France ===
7 January 2024 Round of 64	Dinan Léhon	0–3	Reims	Dinan
17:30 CET (UTC+1)		Report	Diakhon 6', 9'; Daramy 81'	Stadium: Stade du Clos Gastel; Attendance: 2,754; Referee: Marc Bollengier

21 January 2024 Round of 32	Sochaux	2–2 (5–4 p)	Reims	Montbéliard
17:30 CET (UTC+1)	Gomis (yellow card) 16'; Michel 21'; Daho 44' (pen.); Ackra (yellow card) 66'	Report	Agbadou 6', 82'; Bojang (yellow card) 82'	Stadium: Stade Auguste-Bonal; Attendance: 18,754; Referee: Hakim Ben El Hadj
	Penalties
	Hoggas (penalty scored); Liénard (penalty missed); Zohi (penalty scored); Daho (penalty scored); Macalou (penalty scored); Fontaine (penalty scored)		(penalty missed) Teuma; (penalty scored) Khadra; (penalty scored) Daramy; (penalty scored) Wilson-Esbrand; (penalty scored) Agbadou; (penalty missed) Okumu
