= Hafiz Umar Ibrahim =

Nigerian footballer (born 2005)

Personal information
- Date of birth: 20 December 2005 (age 20)
- Place of birth: Kano State, Nigeria
- Height: 1.90 m (6 ft 3 in)
- Position: Striker

Team information
- Current team: Reims
- Number: 85

Youth career
- –2024: Ojodu City FC

Senior career*
Years	Team	Apps	(Gls)
2024–	Reims B	9	(9)
2024–	Reims	32	(6)
- * Club domestic league appearances and goals as of 11 May 2026

Hafiz Umar Ibrahim (born 20 December 2005) is a Nigerian professional footballer who plays as a striker for Ligue 2 club Reims.

== Career ==
Ibrahim grew up in the city of Kano in northern Nigeria, where he sold watermelons in the market to help his family financially. He began his football career at Lagos State amateur club Ojodu City FC. In February 2024, he finished as the top scorer in the Torneo di Viareggio. In the summer of 2024, he went on trial at Premier League club Chelsea, where he scored a hat-trick in his final match with the club's under-19s. However, a transfer didn't materialize as Chelsea was not willing to pay the £500,000 fee requested by Ojodu City FC. Prior to going on trial at Chelsea, Ibrahim had turned down an offer from Eliteserien club Bodø/Glimt after speaking with Chelsea player Raheem Sterling.

On 31 August 2024, Ibrahim signed a four-year contract with French club Reims, initially joining the reserve side in the Championnat National 3. On 22 December 2024, he made his first team debut as a substitute in a 3–1 win over Mutzig in the Coupe de France. On 21 February 2025, he made his Ligue 1 debut for Reims, coming on as a substitute in a 1–0 defeat to Rennes. At the 89th minute, he was sent off after receiving two yellow cards. On 2 April 2025, Ibrahim made his first start of the season for Reims in the Coupe de France semi-finals against Cannes. He scored one goal and assisted another in a 2–1 victory.

== Career statistics ==
As of match played 21 May 2025

Appearances and goals by club, season and competition
Club	Season	League			National cup		Continental		Other		Total	
Club	Season	Division	Apps	Goals	Apps	Goals	Apps	Goals	Apps	Goals	Apps	Goals
Ojodu City FC	2023–24	—			6	0	—		—		6	0
Reims	2024–25	Ligue 1	11	0	2	1	—		1 (Note: Appearance in Ligue 1 relegation/promotion play-offs)	0	14	1
Reims	2025–26	Ligue 2	0	0	0	0	—		—		0	0
Reims	Total		11	0	2	1	—		1	0	14	1
Reims B	2024–25	National 3	9	9	—		—		—		9	9
Career total			20	9	8	1	0	0	1	0	29	10

== Honours ==
Reims

- Coupe de France runner-up: 2024–25

Individual

- Torneo di Viareggio top scorer: 2024
