= Sangui =

Sangui can refer to:

- The word for blood in Corsican, Guinea-Bissau Creole, and Italian
- Nhoa Sangui (born 2006), French football left-back
- Wu Sangui (1612–1678), Chinese military leader
