= Nhoa Sangui =

French footballer (born 2006)

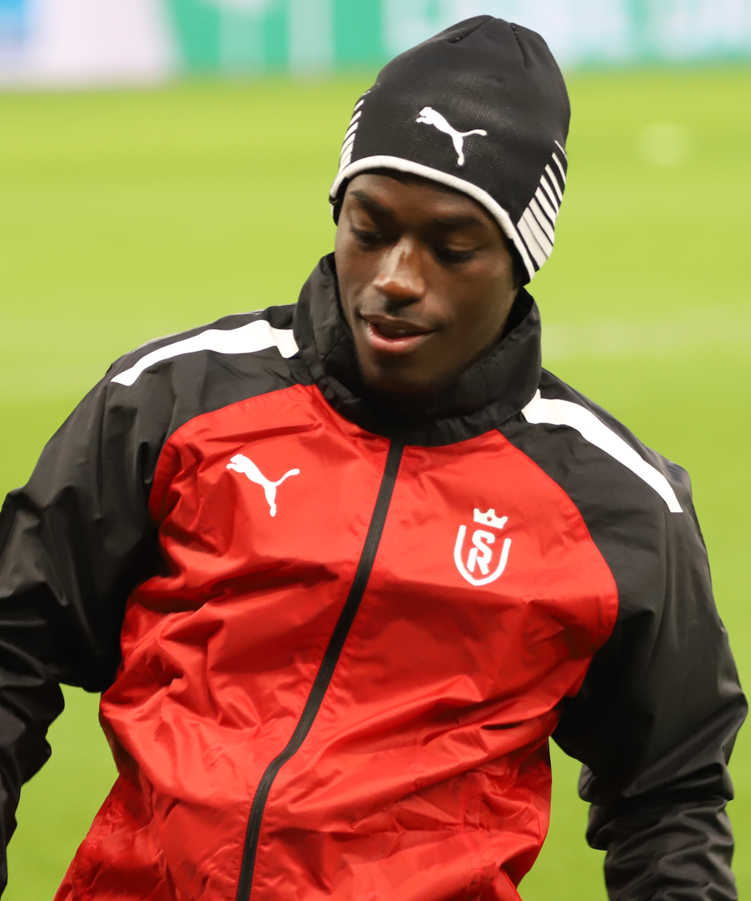
- Sangui with Reims in 2025

Personal information
- Full name: Nhoa Ryan Sangui
- Date of birth: 29 August 2006 (age 20)
- Place of birth: Creil, France
- Height: 1.77 m (5 ft 10 in)
- Position: Left-back

Team information
- Current team: Paris FC
- Number: 19

Youth career
- 2013–2018: Beauvais
- 2018–2021: AFC Creil
- 2021–2023: Reims

Senior career*
Years	Team	Apps	(Gls)
2022–2025	Reims II	18	(0)
2024–2025	Reims	26	(0)
2025–	Paris FC	26	(0)

International career^{‡}
2021–2022	France U16	9	(0)
2022–2023	France U17	13	(0)
2023	France U18	5	(0)
2024–2025	France U19	10	(0)
2025	France U20	3	(0)
2025–	France U21	2	(0)
Medal record
Men's football
Representing France
FIFA U-17 World Cup
Runner-up	2023 Indonesia
UEFA European Under-17 Championship
Runner-up	2023 Hungary
- * Club domestic league appearances and goals as of 19 May 2026 ‡ National team caps and goals as of 30 March 2026

Nhoa Ryan Sangui (born 29 August 2006) is a French professional footballer who plays as a left-back for Ligue 1 club Paris FC.

== Club career ==
Sangui is a product of the youth academies of Beauvais and AFC Creil, before moving to the youth academy of Reims in 2021. In 2022 he was promoted to their reserves, and on 12 July 2023, he signed his first professional contract with Reims. He made his senior and professional debut with them in a 2–2 (5–4) penalty shootout loss in the Coupe de France to Sochaux on 21 October 2024.

== International career ==
Born in France, Sangui is of Congolese descent. He was part of the France U17s that came in second at the 2023 UEFA European Under-17 Championship. He also made the final squad for the U17s at the 2023 FIFA U-17 World Cup.

== Career statistics ==
As of match played 29 May 2025

Appearances and goals by club, season and competition
Club	Season	League			Cup		Other		Total	
Club	Season	Division	Apps	Goals	Apps	Goals	Apps	Goals	Apps	Goals
Reims II	2022–23	CFA 2	10	0	—		—		10	0
Reims II	2023–24	CFA 2	8	0	—		—		8	0
Reims II	Total		18	0	—		—		18	0
Reims	2023–24	Ligue 1	0	0	1	0	—		1	0
Reims	2024–25	Ligue 1	26	0	4	0	2 (Note: Appearances in Ligue 1 relegation/promotion play-offs)	0	32	0
Reims	Total		26	0	5	0	2	0	33	0
Paris FC	2025–26	Ligue 1	0	0	0	0	—		0	0
Career total			44	0	5	0	2	0	51	0

== Honours ==
Reims

- Coupe de France runner-up: 2024–25

France U17

- FIFA U-17 World Cup runner-up: 2023
- UEFA European Under-17 Championship runner-up: 2023

France U20

- Maurice Revello Tournament: 2025

Individual

- UEFA European Under-17 Championship Team of the Tournament: 2023
