= Joseph Okumu =

Kenyan footballer

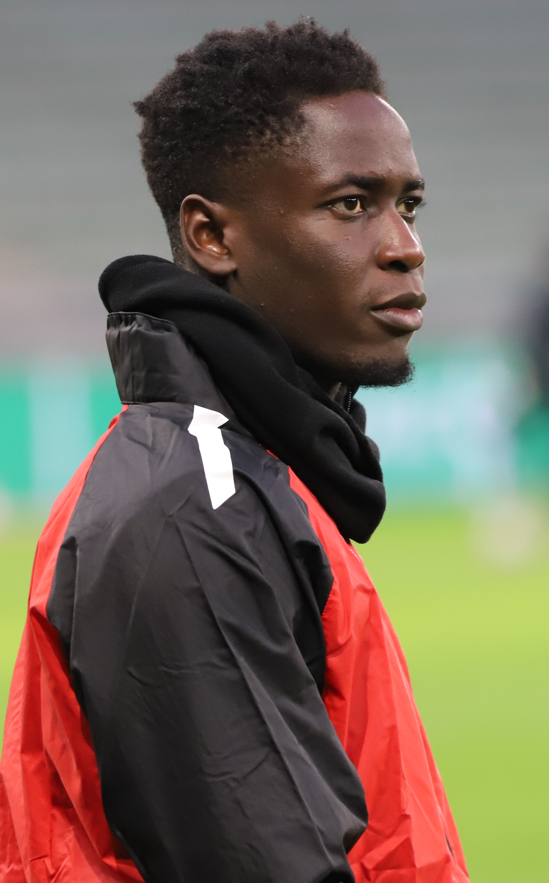
- Okumu in 2025

Personal information
- Full name: Joseph Stanley Okumu
- Date of birth: 26 May 1997 (age 29)
- Place of birth: Kisumu, Kenya
- Height: 1.93 m (6 ft 4 in)
- Position: Defender

Team information
- Current team: Reims
- Number: 2

Senior career*
Years	Team	Apps	(Gls)
2014–2016	Chemelil Sugar		
2016–2017	Free State Stars	7	(0)
2018	AFC Ann Arbor	8	(0)
2018–2019	Real Monarchs	12	(0)
2019–2021	IF Elfsborg	34	(0)
2021–2023	Gent	61	(2)
2023–	Reims	44	(2)

International career^{‡}
- Kenya U21
- Kenya U23
2016–	Kenya	20	(0)
- * Club domestic league appearances and goals as of 2 December 2025 ‡ National team caps and goals as of 12:05, 26 December 2023 (UTC)

Joseph Stanley Okumu (born 26 May 1997) is a Kenyan professional footballer who plays as a defender for Ligue 2 club Reims and the Kenya national team.

== Club career ==
Okumu has played club football for Chemelil Sugar, Free State Stars and AFC Ann Arbor. At AFC Ann Arbor he made 8 league appearances in the 2018 season.

On 16 August 2018, Okumu signed for USL Championship side Real Monarchs.

On 28 August 2019, Okumu transferred to Swedish Allsvenskan side IF Elfsborg for an undisclosed fee.

He signed for Belgian club Gent on 21 June 2021 for €3.5 million.

On 22 July 2023, Okumu transferred to the French club Reims.

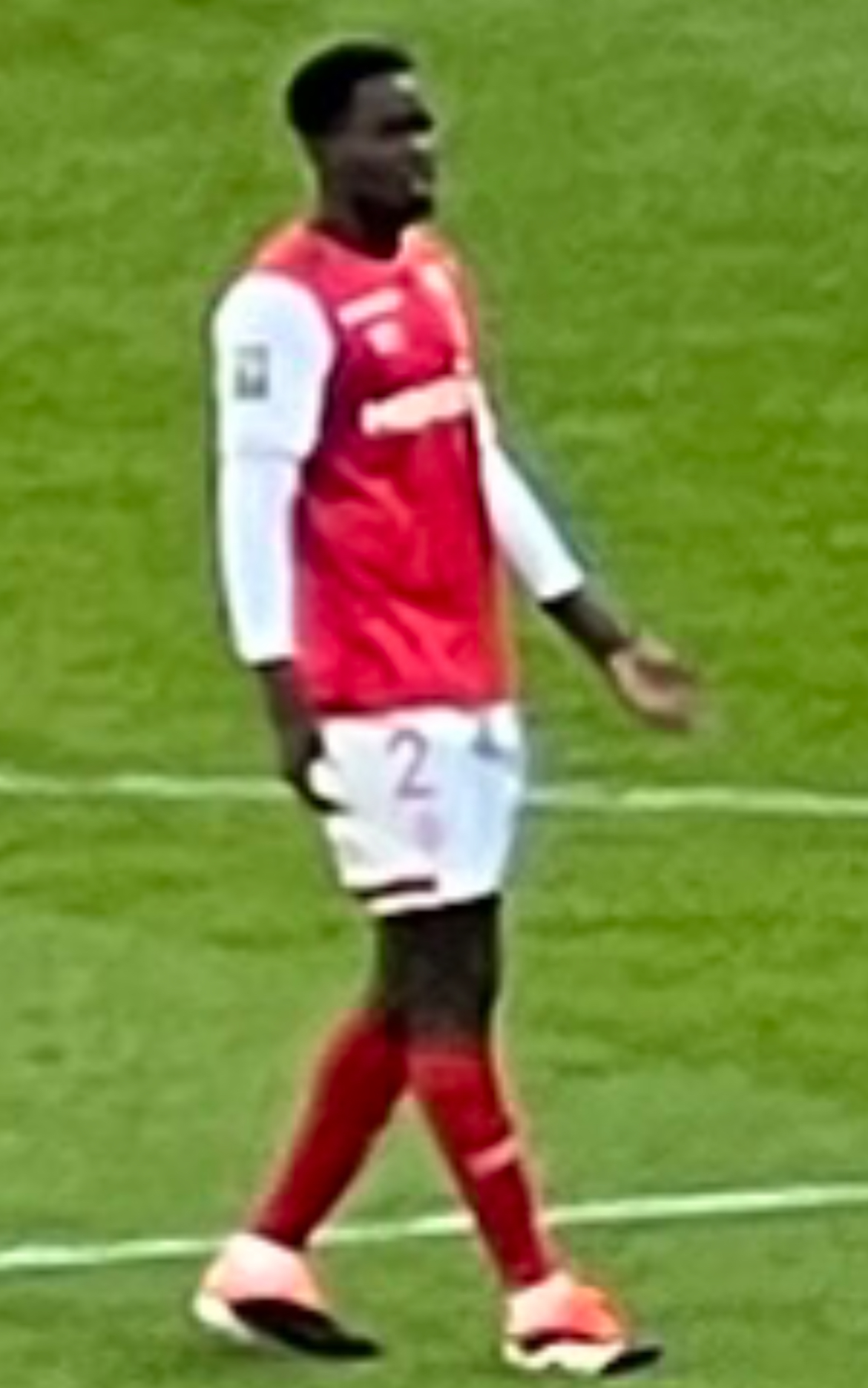
Okumu in 2024.

== International career ==
After spending time with the Kenyan under-21 and under-23 teams, he made his debut for the senior Kenya national team in a friendly match against Sudan, starting the game and playing the full 90 minutes.

He represented Kenya at the 2019 Africa Cup of Nations.

On 7 September 2023, Okumu scored his first international goal in a friendly against Qatar.

== Career statistics ==
As of match played 29 May 2025

Appearances and goals by club, season and competition
Club	Season	League			National Cup (Note: Includes Nedbank Cup, Svenska Cupen, Belgian Cup)		Continental		Other		Total	
Club	Season	Division	Apps	Goals	Apps	Goals	Apps	Goals	Apps	Goals	Apps	Goals
Free State Stars	2016–17	South African Premier Division	7	0	1	0	—		—		8	0
Real Monarchs	2018	USL	2	0	—		—		1 (Note: Appearance(s) in play-off)	0	3	0
Real Monarchs	2019	USLC	10	0	—		—		—		10	0
Real Monarchs	Total		12	0	—		—		1	0	13	0
Elfsborg	2019	Allsvenskan	3	0	0	0	—		—		3	0
Elfsborg	2020	Allsvenskan	24	0	4	0	—		—		28	0
Elfsborg	2021	Allsvenskan	7	0	3	0	—		—		10	0
Elfsborg	Total		34	0	7	0	—		—		41	0
Gent	2021–22	Belgian Pro League	27	0	6	1	10 (Note: Appearance(s) in UEFA Conference League)	1	4	1	47	3
Gent	2022–23	Belgian Pro League	28	1	3	0	11 (Note: Two appearances in UEFA Europa League, and nine appearances in UEFA Conference League)	0	3 (Note: Two appearances in play-off, and one appearance in Belgian Super Cup)	0	45	1
Gent	Total		55	1	9	1	21	1	7	1	92	4
Reims	2023–24	Ligue 1	21	1	0	0	—		—		21	1
Reims	2024–25	Ligue 1	22	1	4	0	—		2 (Note: Appearance(s) in Ligue 1 relegation/promotion play-offs)	0	28	1
Reims	2025–26	Ligue 2	0	0	0	0	—		—		0	0
Reims	Total		43	2	4	0	—		2	0	49	2
Career total			151	3	21	1	21	1	10	1	203	6

== Honours ==
Reims

- Coupe de France runner-up: 2024–25
