= Adama Bojang =

Gambian footballer

Personal information
- Full name: Adama Bojang
- Date of birth: 28 May 2004 (age 22)
- Place of birth: Bakau, Gambia
- Height: 1.83 m (6 ft 0 in)
- Position: Forward

Team information
- Current team: Charleroi (on loan from Reims)

Senior career*
Years	Team	Apps	(Gls)
–2023	Steve Biko FC		
2023–	Reims	33	(2)
2023–	Reims II	9	(9)
2024–2025	→ Grasshopper (loan)	26	(6)
2026–	→ Charleroi (loan)	0	(0)

International career^{‡}
2023	Gambia U20	10	(6)
2025–	Gambia	5	(0)
- * Club domestic league appearances and goals as of 11 May 2026 ‡ National team caps and goals as of 29 May 2026

Adama Bojang (born 28 May 2004) is a Gambian professional footballer who plays as a forward for Belgian Pro League club Charleroi on loan from the French side Reims, and the Gambia national team. He was part of the Gambia squad that finished runner-up at the 2023 U-20 Africa Cup of Nations.

== Club career ==
Born in Bakau, Bojang played in the Gambian top division for Steve Biko FC. He helped the side earn promotion from the Gambian second division in 2021. In January 2023, during the second game week of the new season scored the first hat-trick of the season by any player in the Gambian First Division league, when he netted three goals in a 4–1 win over Brikama United at the Bakau Mini Stadium. Due to his form for club and country Gambia Football Federation vice-president Bakary Jammeh confirmed in the media that Bojang was generating interest from football clubs abroad, including some in Egypt and England. In July 2023 Bojang signed a five-year contract with Reims.

On 7 September 2024, he joined Swiss record champions Grasshopper Club Zürich on loan for the 2024–25 season. He had a difficult start to life on loan, being unable to contribute to a single goal in his first 14 appearances. He finally ended his personal drought on 22 February 2025, scoring both goals in 2–2 draw away to FC Lausanne-Sport. On 6 April 2025, he scored a hattrick against FC Luzern, scoring all three goals in the 3–1 home victory. He returns to France following the end of the season.

On 18 July 2026, Bojang was loaned by Charleroi in Belgium.

== International career ==
He played for Gambia, who were coached by Abdoulie Bojang, Adama's grandfather, at the 2023 U-20 Africa Cup of Nations. Bojang scored four goals including scored a hat-trick against South Sudan in the quarter-final. He also scored the winner against Nigeria in the semi-final. The results in the tournament qualified the Gambian team for the 2023 FIFA U-20 World Cup. Bojang was also named in the CAF Best XI Team of the Tournament.

== Personal life ==
A reported 6 ft 3ins, he has been nicknamed ‘the Gambian Hurricane'.

== Career statistics ==
=== Club ===
As of 31 May 2025

Appearances by club, season and competition
Club	Season	League			Cup		League cup		Continental		Other		Total	
Club	Season	Division	Apps	Goals	Apps	Goals	Apps	Goals	Apps	Goals	Apps	Goals	Apps	Goals
Steve Biko FC	2022–23	GFA League	—		—		—		—		—		0	0
Reims B	2023–24	Championnat National 3	8	8	—		—		—		—		8	8
Reims	2023–24	Ligue 1	9	0	2	0	0	0	—		—		11	0
Reims	2024–25	Ligue 1	0	0	0	0	0	0	—		—		0	0
Grasshopper (loan)	2024–25	Swiss Super League	25	6	1	0	—		—		0	0	27	6
Career total			43	14	3	0	0	0	0	0	0	0	46	14
