= Mory Gbane =

Ivorian footballer (born 2000)

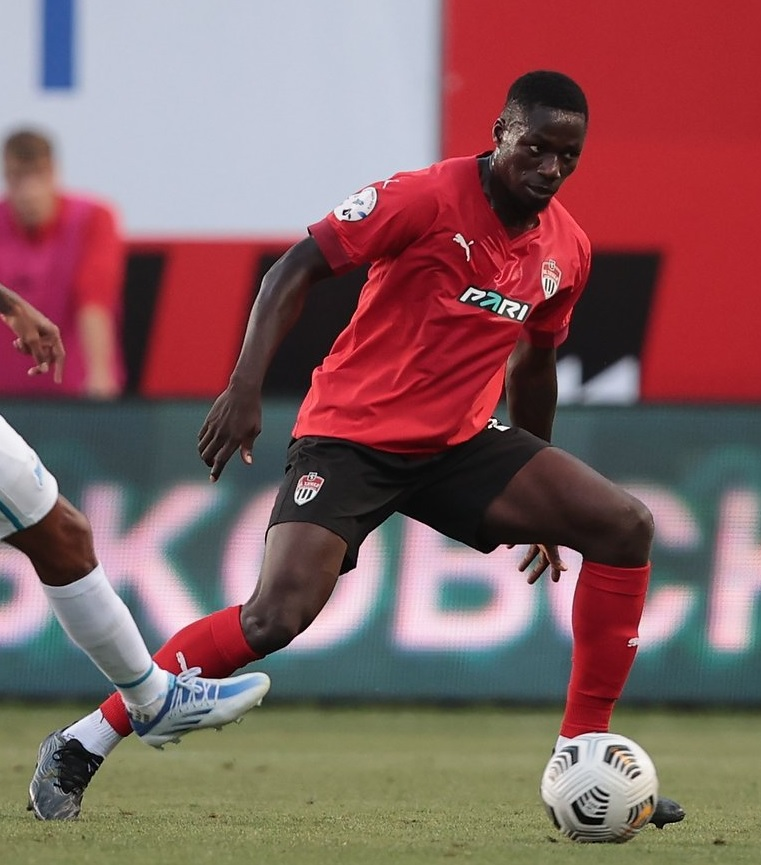
- Gbane with Khimki in 2022

Personal information
- Full name: Roman Mory Diaman Gbane
- Date of birth: 25 December 2000 (age 25)
- Place of birth: Toumodi, Ivory Coast
- Height: 1.88 m (6 ft 2 in)
- Position: Defensive midfielder

Team information
- Current team: Reims
- Number: 24

Senior career*
Years	Team	Apps	(Gls)
2018–2019	Stade d'Abidjan		
2019–2023	BSK Bijelo Brdo	60	(4)
2022–2023	→ Khimki (loan)	22	(0)
2023–2024	Khimki	0	(0)
2023–2024	→ Gil Vicente (loan)	29	(1)
2024–2025	Gil Vicente	18	(1)
2025–	Reims	39	(3)

International career^{‡}
2025–	Ivory Coast	2	(0)
- * Club domestic league appearances and goals as of 11 May 2026 ‡ National team caps and goals as of 11 June 2025

Roman Mory Diaman Gbane (born 25 December 2000), known as Mory Gbane, is an Ivorian professional footballer who plays as a defensive midfielder for Ligue 2 club Reims and the Ivory Coast national team.

== Club career ==
Gbane joined Russian Premier League club FC Khimki on a season-long loan on 15 July 2022. He made his RPL debut for Khimki on the same day in a game against the Russian champions FC Zenit Saint Petersburg.

Gbane joined Gil Vicente on loan with option to buy on 31 July 2023.

On 28 May 2024, Portuguese club Gil Vicente where Gbane played on loan in the 2023–24 season, announced that the transfer was made permanent and Gbane signed a contract with Gil Vicente until 2027.

On 3 February 2025, Gbane signed a four-and-a-half-year contract with Reims in France.

== Career statistics ==
=== Club ===
As of 29 May 2025

Appearances and goals by club, season and competition
Club	Season	League			Cup		Continental		Total	
Club	Season	Division	Apps	Goals	Apps	Goals	Apps	Goals	Apps	Goals
Stade d'Abidjan	2018–19	Ligue 2	–		–		2 (Note: Appearances in the CAF Confederation Cup)	0	2	0
BSK Bijelo Brdo	2019–20	Prva NL	8	0	1	0	–		9	0
BSK Bijelo Brdo	2020–21	Prva NL	29	2	0	0	–		29	2
BSK Bijelo Brdo	2021–22	Prva NL	23	2	3	1	–		26	3
BSK Bijelo Brdo	Total		60	4	4	1	0	0	66	5
Khimki	2022–23	RPL	14	0	2	0	–		16	0
Gil Vicente (loan)	2023–24	Primeira Liga	29	1	1	0	–		30	1
Gil Vicente	2024–25	Primeira Liga	18	1	3	0	–		21	1
Reims	2024–25	Ligue 1	13	0	4	0	2 (Note: Appearances in Ligue 1 relegation/promotion play-offs)	0	19	0
Reims	2025–26	Ligue 2	0	0	0	0	–		0	0
Reims	Total		13	0	4	0	2	0	19	0
Career total			134	6	14	1	4	0	152	6

=== International ===
As of match played 11 June 2025

Appearances and goals by national team and year
National team	Year	Apps	Goals
Ivory Coast	2025	2	0
Total		2	0

== Honours ==
Reims

- Coupe de France runner-up: 2024–25
