= Amadou Koné (footballer, born May 2005) =

Malian-Ivorian footballer (born 2005)

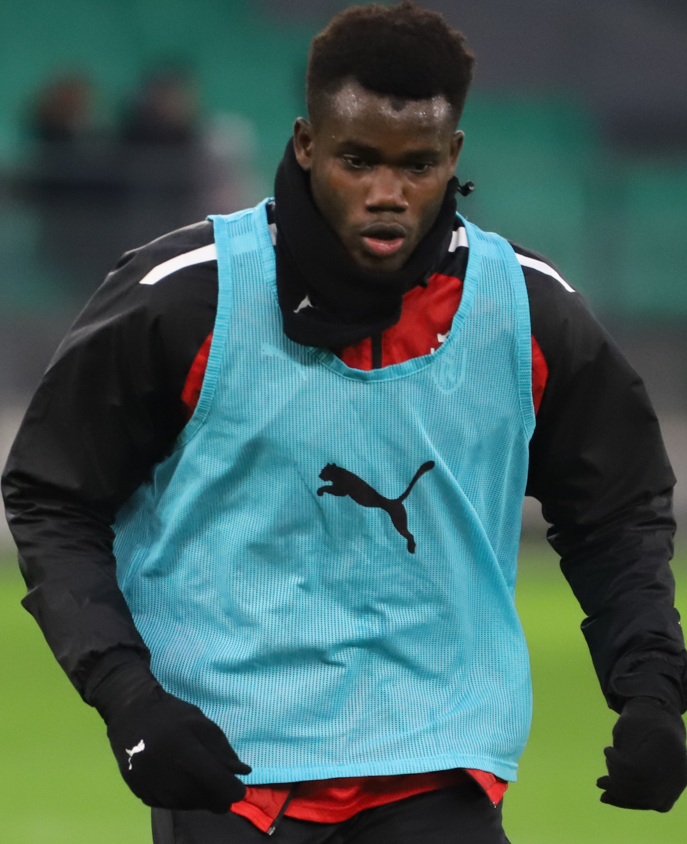
- Koné with Reims in 2025

Personal information
- Date of birth: 14 May 2005 (age 21)
- Place of birth: Bamako, Mali
- Height: 1.75 m (5 ft 9 in)
- Position: Midfielder

Team information
- Current team: Neom
- Number: 72

Youth career
- Afrique Football Élite

Senior career*
Years	Team	Apps	(Gls)
2023–2025	Reims II	11	(1)
2023–2025	Reims	40	(0)
2025–	Neom	49	(7)

International career^{‡}
2024–	Ivory Coast U23	1	(0)
2026–	Ivory Coast	1	(0)
- * Club domestic league appearances and goals as of 13 September 2026 ‡ National team caps and goals as of 3 October 2026

Amadou Koné (born 14 May 2005) is a professional footballer who plays as a midfielder for Saudi Pro League club Neom. Born in Mali, he represents the Ivory Coast national team.

== Early life ==
Koné is a youth product of the Malian club Afrique Football Élite. In March 2023, he was named "Player of the Tournament" at the 2023 African Youth Cup.

== Club career ==
In July 2023, Koné transferred to the Ligue 1 club Reims, initially joining the second team. He made his first team debut on 22 October 2023, in a substitute appearance, against Toulouse. He made his first start in a Coupe de France match against Sochaux on 21 January 2024.

In July 2025, Koné joined Neom in the Saudi Pro League.

== International career ==
Koné is of Malian and Ivorian descent and holds both nationalities. He also holds French nationality. Koné lives in Paris with his girlfriend. In November 2023, he was called up to the Ivory Coast U23, but was not able to attend. In March 2024, he was called up for a friendly against France U23.

On 3 October 2026, Koné made his debut for the Ivory Coast national team in a friendly against Cameroon.

== Career statistics ==
As of match played 29 May 2025

Appearances and goals by club, season and competition
Club	Season	League			National cup (Note: Includes Coupe de France)		Other		Total	
Club	Season	Division	Apps	Goals	Apps	Goals	Apps	Goals	Apps	Goals
Reims II	2023–24	National 3	10	1	—		—		10	1
Reims	2023–24	Ligue 1	16	0	—		—		16	0
Reims	2024–25	Ligue 1	24	0	4	0	2 (Note: Appearances in Ligue 1 relegation/promotion play-offs)	0	30	0
Reims	Total		40	0	4	0	2	0	46	0
Neom	2025–26	Saudi Pro League	0	5	0	0	—		0	0
Career total			50	6	4	0	2	0	56	1

== Honours ==
Reims

- Coupe de France runner-up: 2024–25
