= Anto Sekongo =

Malian footballer (born 2004)

Personal information
- Full name: Yirigue Foungognan Sekongo
- Date of birth: 13 June 2004 (age 22)
- Place of birth: Attécoubé, Ivory Coast
- Height: 1.78 m (5 ft 10 in)
- Position: Attacking midfielder

Team information
- Current team: Samsunspor
- Number: 42

Youth career
- –2023: Afrique Football Élite

Senior career*
Years	Team	Apps	(Gls)
2023–2024	Reims B	2	(14)
2024–2026	Dunkerque	58	(10)
2026–	Samsunspor		
- * Club domestic league appearances and goals as of 11 May 2026

Yirigue Foungognan Sekongo (born 13 June 2004) is a Malian professional footballer who plays as an attacking midfielder for Süper Lig club Samsunspor.

== Club career ==
Sekongo joined Reims on 6 July 2023.

Sekongo joined Dunkerque on July 16, 2024, signing a 2-year contract.
