= Teddy Teuma =

Footballer (born 1993)

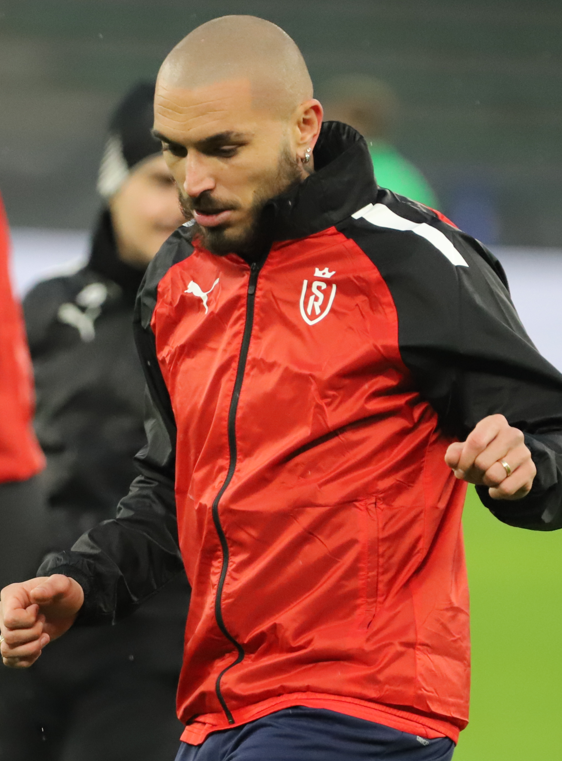
- Teuma with Reims in 2025

Personal information
- Date of birth: 30 September 1993 (age 33)
- Place of birth: Toulon, France
- Height: 1.76 m (5 ft 9 in)
- Position: Midfielder

Team information
- Current team: Sliema Wanderers

Senior career*
Years	Team	Apps	(Gls)
2011–2015	Hyères	89	(6)
2015–2017	Boulogne	55	(8)
2015–2016	Boulogne B	3	(0)
2017–2019	Red Star	43	(6)
2019–2023	Union SG	118	(23)
2023–2026	Reims	61	(11)
2026	Standard Liège	9	(0)
2026–	Sliema Wanderers	12	(0)

International career^{‡}
2020–	Malta	56	(7)
- * Club domestic league appearances and goals as of 16:00, 22 November 2026 (UTC) ‡ National team caps and goals as of 21:20, 16 November 2026 (UTC)

Teddy Teuma (born 30 September 1993) is a professional footballer who plays as a midfielder for Maltese Premier League club Sliema Wanderers. Born in France, he plays for the Malta national team.

== Club career ==
On 27 July 2018, the first matchday of the 2018–19 season, Teuma made his Ligue 2 debut with Red Star in a 2–1 home defeat to Niort.

In January 2019, he signed a 2.5-year contract with Royale Union Saint-Gilloise. On 13 October 2022, Teuma signed an extension with Union SG until 2025.

Teuma joined French Ligue 1 side Stade de Reims in July 2023. He signed a three-year contract with a club-side option of a fourth year. The transfer fee paid to Union SG was reported as €4 million.

On 12 August 2023, he played against Marseille, becoming the first (Note: and to date the only)Maltese to play in Ligue 1.

On 27 August 2023, he scored a brace against Montpellier, his first goals with Reims, and became the first (Note: and to date the only) Maltese to score in Ligue 1.

On 16 January 2026, he was transferred to Belgian Pro League club Standard Liège for the remainder of the season. At the end of the season, Teuma signed a deal with Maltese Premier League club Sliema Wanderers.

== International career ==
Born in France, Teuma is of Maltese descent and holds a Maltese passport. On 25 August 2020, the Malta Football Association announced that Teddy Teuma had become eligible to play for the Malta national team. On 28 August 2020, he received his first call up to the Malta national team.

== Career statistics ==
=== Club ===
As of match played 22 November 2026

Appearances and goals by club, season and competition
Club	Season	League			Cup (Note: Includes Coupe de France and Belgian Cup)		Continental		Other		Total	
Club	Season	Division	Apps	Goals	Apps	Goals	Apps	Goals	Apps	Goals	Apps	Goals
Hyères	2011-12	Championnat de France Amateur	9	0	0	0	—		—		9	0
Hyères	2012-13	Championnat de France Amateur	29	2	0	0	—		—		29	2
Hyères	2013-14	Championnat de France Amateur	22	0	0	0	—		—		22	0
Hyères	2014-15	Championnat de France Amateur	29	4	0	0	—		—		29	4
Hyères	Total		89	6	0	0	—		—		89	6
Boulogne	2015-16	Championnat National	24	6	1	0	—		—		25	6
Boulogne	2016-17	Championnat National	31	2	0	0	—		—		31	2
Boulogne	Total		55	8	1	0	—		—		56	8
Boulogne B	2015–16	Championnat National 3	3	0	—		—		—		3	0
Red Star	2017–18	Championnat National	30	5	0	0	—		3 (Note: Appearance(s) in the Coupe de la Ligue)	1	33	6
Red Star	2018–19	Ligue 2	13	1	2	0	—		1	0	16	1
Red Star	Total		43	6	2	0	—		4	1	49	7
Union SG	2018–19	Belgian First Division B	6	0	2	0	—		8 (Note: Appearances in First Division A Europa League play-offs)	0	16	0
Union SG	2019–20	Belgian First Division B	27	4	2	0	—		—		29	4
Union SG	2020–21	Belgian First Division B	25	5	2	0	—		—		27	5
Union SG	2021–22	Belgian First Division A	32	6	2	1	—		6 (Note: Appearances in First Division A Championship play-offs)	0	40	7
Union SG	2022–23	Belgian First Division A	22	7	4	0	8 (Note: Includes two appearances in 2022–23 UEFA Champions League qualifying phase and play-off round and six appearances in 2022–23 UEFA Europa League)	3	—		36	10
Union SG	Total		112	22	12	1	8	3	14	0	148	26
Reims	2023–24	Ligue 1	28	6	2	0	—		—		30	6
Reims	2024–25	Ligue 1	17	1	3	1	—		—		20	2
Reims	2025–26	Ligue 2	16	4	3	2	–		–		19	6
Reims	Total		61	11	8	3	—		—		69	14
Standard Liège	2025–26	Belgian Pro League	9	0	–		–		–		9	0
Sliema Wanderers	2026–27	Maltese Premier League	12	0	0	0	–		–		12	0
Career total			383	53	23	4	8	3	18	1	433	61

=== International ===
As of match played 16 November 2026

Appearances and goals by national team and year
National team	Year	Apps	Goals
Malta	2020	6	0
Malta	2021	12	0
Malta	2022	9	3
Malta	2023	7	0
Malta	2024	7	1
Malta	2025	7	1
Malta	2026	8	2
Total		56	7

Scores and results list Malta's goal tally first, score column indicates score after each Teuma goal.

List of international goals scored by Teddy Teuma
No.	Date	Venue	Opponent	Score	Result	Competition
1	29 March 2022	National Stadium, Ta'Qali, Malta	Kuwait	2–0	2–0	Friendly
2	23 September 2022	Lilleküla Stadium, Tallinn, Estonia	Estonia	1–1	1–2	2022–23 UEFA Nations League
3	17 November 2022	National Stadium, Ta'Qali, Malta	Greece	2–1	2–2	Friendly
4	13 October 2024	National Stadium, Ta'Qali, Malta	Moldova	1–0	1–0	2024–25 UEFA Nations League
5	17 November 2025	National Stadium, Ta'Qali, Malta	Poland	2–2	2–3	2026 FIFA World Cup qualification
6	24 September 2026	Estadi de la FAF, Encamp, Andorra	Andorra	2–1	2–1	2026–27 UEFA Nations League D
7	4 October 2026	National Stadium, Ta'Qali, Malta	Andorra	1–0	1–0	2026–27 UEFA Nations League D

== Honours ==
Red Star

- Championnat National: 2017–18

Union SG

- Belgian First Division B: 2020–21
