= Valentin Atangana =

Footballer (born 2005)

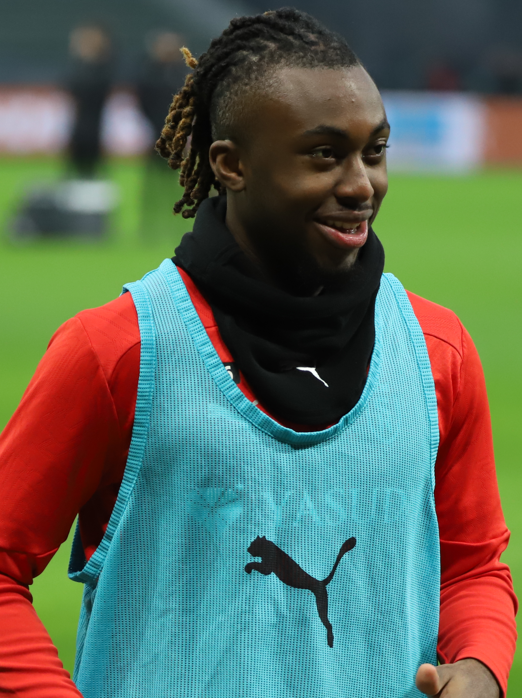
- Atangana with Reims in 2025

Personal information
- Full name: Valentin Atangana Edoa
- Date of birth: 25 August 2005 (age 21)
- Place of birth: Yaoundé, Cameroon
- Height: 1.76 m (5 ft 9 in)
- Position: Defensive midfielder

Team information
- Current team: Al-Ahli
- Number: 6

Youth career
- 2011–2014: FCF La Neuvillette-Jamin
- 2015–2022: Reims

Senior career*
| Years | Team | Apps | (Gls) |
| 2021–2023 | Reims II | 22 | (0) |
| 2023–2025 | Reims | 56 | (1) |
| 2025– | Al-Ahli | 35 | (5) |

International career^{‡}
| 2021–2022 | France U17 | 21 | (1) |
| 2022–2023 | France U18 | 7 | (2) |
| 2023–2024 | France U19 | 13 | (2) |
| 2024–2025 | France U20 | 4 | (0) |
| 2024– | France U21 | 7 | (2) |
Medal record
Men's football
Representing France
UEFA European Under-19 Championship
| Runner-up | 2024 Northern Ireland |
UEFA European Under-17 Championship
| Winner | 2022 Israel |
- * Club domestic league appearances and goals as of 20 November 2026 ‡ National team caps and goals as of 30 March 2026

Valentin Atangana Edoa (born 25 August 2005) is a professional footballer who plays as a defensive midfielder for Saudi Pro League club Al-Ahli. Born in Cameroon, he is a youth international for France.

== Club career ==
Atangana is a youth product of FCF La Neuvillette-Jamin, before moving to the academy of Reims in 2015. He began his senior career with the Reims reserves in 2021, and signed his first professional contract with the club on 7 May 2022. He made his professional debut with Reims as a late substitute in a 4–0 Ligue 1 win over Troyes on 12 February 2023.

Atangana extended his contract with Reims on 3 October 2023.

On 6 September 2025, Atangana joined Saudi Pro League club Al-Ahli for €25 million. Atangana became part of the squad that won the 2025–26 AFC Champions League Elite, contributing in midfield during the campaign.

== International career ==
Born in Cameroon, Atangana moved to France at a young age and was naturalized. He played for the France U17 in the tournament winning campaign at the 2022 UEFA European Under-17 Championship.

== Style of playing ==
Atangana primarily plays as a defensive midfielder, but can also operate as a central midfielder or right-back. He is a strong leader who fights defensively and helps other players shine.

== Career statistics ==
As of match played 28 November 2025

Appearances and goals by club, season and competition
| Club | Season | League | | | National cup (Note: Includes Coupe de France, King's Cup) | | Continental | | Other | | Total | |
| Club | Season | Division | Apps | Goals | Apps | Goals | Apps | Goals | Apps | Goals | Apps | Goals |
|---|---|---|---|---|---|---|---|---|---|---|---|---|
| Reims II | 2021–22 | CFA 2 | 4 | 0 | — | | — | | — | | 4 | 0 |
| Reims II | 2022–23 | CFA 2 | 18 | 0 | — | | — | | — | | 18 | 0 |
| Reims II | Total | | 22 | 0 | — | | — | | — | | 22 | 0 |
| Reims | 2022–23 | Ligue 1 | 7 | 0 | — | | — | | — | | 7 | 0 |
| Reims | 2023–24 | Ligue 1 | 15 | 0 | 0 | 0 | — | | — | | 15 | 0 |
| Reims | 2024–25 | Ligue 1 | 34 | 1 | 5 | 0 | — | | 2 (Note: Appearances in Ligue 1 relegation/promotion play-offs) | 0 | 41 | 1 |
| Reims | Total | | 56 | 1 | 5 | 0 | — | | 2 | 0 | 63 | 1 |
| Al-Ahli | 2025–26 | Saudi Pro League | 4 | 0 | 2 | 1 | 4 (Note: Appearances in AFC Champions League Elite) | 0 | 1 (Note: Appearance in FIFA Intercontinental Cup) | 0 | 11 | 1 |
| Career total | | | 82 | 1 | 7 | 1 | 4 | 0 | 3 | 0 | 96 | 2 |

== Honours ==
Reims

- Coupe de France runner-up: 2024–25

Al-Ahli

- AFC Champions League Elite: 2025–26

France U17

- UEFA European Under-17 Championship: 2022

France U19

- UEFA European Under-19 Championship runner-up: 2024

Individual

- UEFA European Under-19 Championship Team of the Tournament: 2024
