= Aurélio Buta =

Footballer (born 1997)

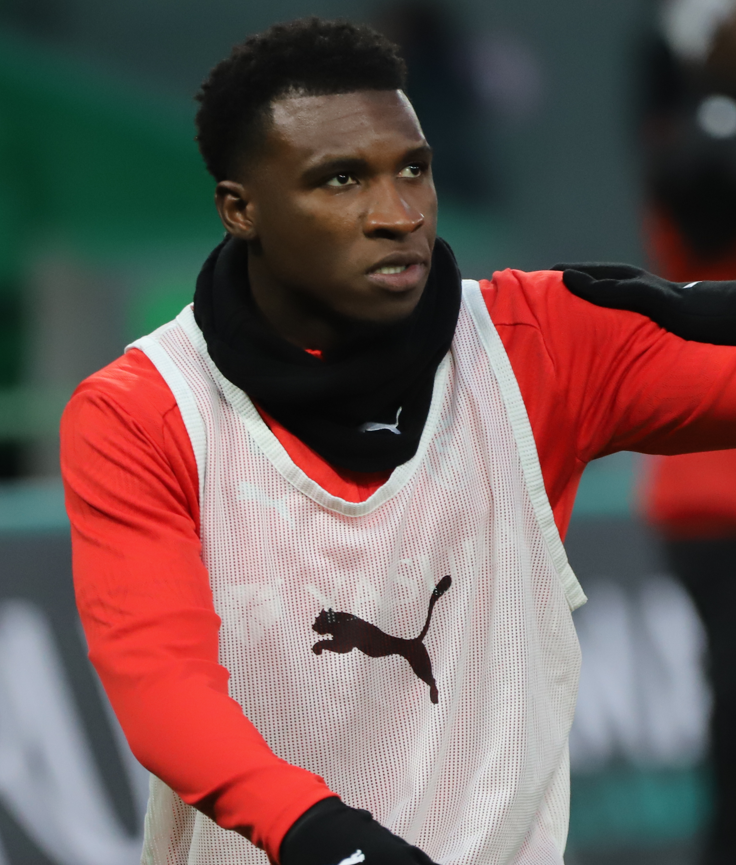
- Buta with Reims in 2025

Personal information
- Full name: Aurélio Gabriel Ulineia Buta
- Date of birth: 10 February 1997 (age 29)
- Place of birth: Miconge, Angola
- Height: 1.72 m (5 ft 8 in)
- Positions: Right-back; right wing-back

Team information
- Current team: São Paulo
- Number: 20

Youth career
- 2005–2009: Águeda
- 2009–2011: Beira-Mar
- 2011–2016: Benfica

Senior career*
Years	Team	Apps	(Gls)
2016–2018	Benfica B	29	(2)
2017–2018	→ Royal Antwerp (loan)	15	(0)
2018–2022	Royal Antwerp	90	(2)
2022–2026	Eintracht Frankfurt	52	(4)
2024–2025	→ Reims (loan)	27	(0)
2026	Copenhagen	12	(1)
2026–	São Paulo	0	(0)

International career
2013	Portugal U16	11	(2)
2013–2014	Portugal U17	18	(2)
2015	Portugal U18	7	(0)
2015–2016	Portugal U19	16	(6)
2016–2017	Portugal U20	5	(0)
- * Club domestic league appearances and goals as of 21 May 2026

Aurélio Gabriel Ulineia Buta (born 10 February 1997) is a professional footballer who plays as a right-back or right wing-back for Campeonato Brasileiro Série A club São Paulo. Born in Angola, he is a former youth international for Portugal.

A regular youth international for Portugal, Buta has played in Portugal, Belgium, Germany and France.

== Club career ==
On 6 August 2016, Buta made his professional debut with Benfica B in a 2016–17 LigaPro match against Cova da Piedade. On 31 August 2017, he joined Belgian side Royal Antwerp on a season-long loan deal. For the next season, he signed a permanent three-year contract with the latter club.

On 3 June 2022, it was announced that Buta would join Bundesliga side Eintracht Frankfurt when his contract with Antwerp expired on 30 June. Upon joining Eintracht Frankfurt, it was discovered he had injured his knee. This kept him out intil January 2023, where he made his debut in a friendly against Lech Poznań, assisting Lucas Alario and scoring the equalizer. In January 2024, he made his 50th appearance for the club against RB Leipzig, scoring 4 goals and 5 assists during his time at the club.

On 28 August 2024, Buta moved to Reims in France on loan with an option to buy. He was named on the bench in the 2024–25 Coupe de France final as PSG won against Reims.

Buta returned to Eintracht Frankfurt after his loan expired with Reims. On 19 July 2025, he scored against FSV Frankfurt in the 2nd minute, during a pre-season friendly.

On 30 January 2026, Buta signed with Copenhagen in Denmark. He made his superliga debut on 8 February 2026 against FC Midtjylland.

On 16 July 2026, Buta signed with São Paulo in Brazil, his first club outside Europe.

== Career statistics ==
As of match played 21 May 2026

Appearances and goals by club, season and competition
Club	Season	League			National cup (Note: Includes Belgian Cup)		Europe		Other		Total	
Club	Season	Division	Apps	Goals	Apps	Goals	Apps	Goals	Apps	Goals	Apps	Goals
Benfica B	2016–17	LigaPro	29	2	—		—		—		29	2
Royal Antwerp (loan)	2017–18	Belgian Pro League	15	0	2	0	—		—		17	0
Royal Antwerp	2018–19	Belgian Pro League	20	0	1	0	—		—		21	0
Royal Antwerp	2019–20	Belgian Pro League	28	2	4	0	3 (Note: Appearances in UEFA Europa League)	0	—		35	2
Royal Antwerp	2020–21	Belgian Pro League	25	0	1	0	8	0	—		34	0
Royal Antwerp	2021–22	Belgian Pro League	17	0	0	0	4	0	—		21	0
Royal Antwerp	Total		105	2	8	0	15	0	—		128	2
Eintracht Frankfurt	2022–23	Bundesliga	18	3	4	0	2 (Note: Appearances in UEFA Europa Conference League)	0	—		24	3
Eintracht Frankfurt	2023–24	Bundesliga	30	1	3	0	8	0	—		41	1
Eintracht Frankfurt	2025–26	Bundesliga	4	0	0	0	2	0	—		6	0
Eintracht Frankfurt	Total		52	4	7	0	12	0	—		71	4
Reims (loan)	2024–25	Ligue 1	27	0	3	0	—		1 (Note: Appearance in Ligue 1 relegation/promotion play-offs)	0	31	0
Copenhagen	2025–26	Danish Superliga	12	1	2	0	0	0	—		14	1
São Paulo	2026	Brasileirão	0	0	0	0	0	0	–		0	0
Career total			225	9	20	0	27	0	1	0	273	9

== Honours ==
Benfica

- UEFA Youth League runner-up: 2016–17

Antwerp

- Belgian Cup: 2019–20

Reims

- Coupe de France runner-up: 2024–25

Individual

- UEFA European Under-19 Championship Team of the Tournament: 2016
