= Gabriel Moscardo =

Brazilian footballer (born 2005)

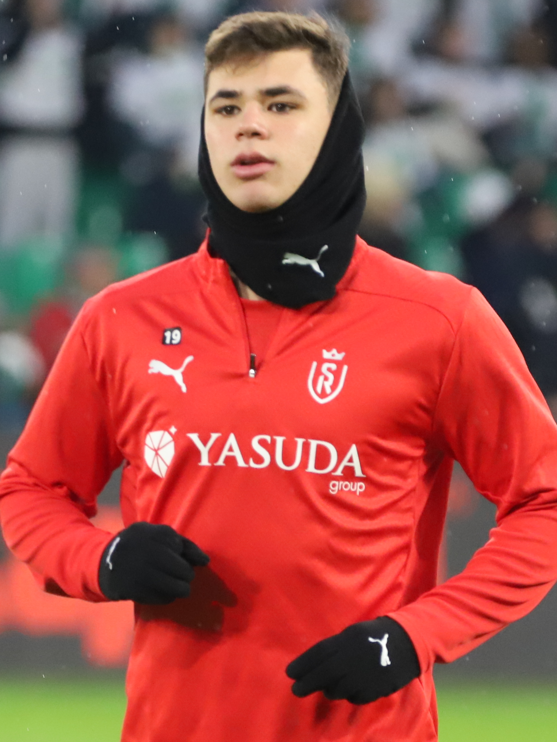
- Moscardo with Reims in 2025

Personal information
- Full name: Gabriel Silva Moscardo de Salles
- Date of birth: 28 September 2005 (age 21)
- Place of birth: Taubaté, Brazil
- Height: 1.85 m (6 ft 1 in)
- Position: Defensive midfielder

Team information
- Current team: Espanyol (on loan from Paris Saint-Germain)
- Number: 20

Youth career
- 2015–2017: Atleta Cidadão
- 2017–2023: Corinthians

Senior career*
| Years | Team | Apps | (Gls) |
| 2023–2024 | Corinthians | 18 | (1) |
| 2024– | Paris Saint-Germain | 0 | (0) |
| 2024 | → Corinthians (loan) | 2 | (0) |
| 2024–2025 | → Reims (loan) | 6 | (0) |
| 2025–2026 | → Braga (loan) | 23 | (0) |
| 2026– | → Espanyol (loan) | 6 | (0) |

International career^{‡}
| 2025 | Brazil U20 | 9 | (1) |
| 2023– | Brazil U23 | 1 | (0) |
Medal record
Men's football
Representing Brazil
South American U-20 Championship
| Winner | 2025 Venezuela |
- * Club domestic league appearances and goals as of 20:02, 31 October 2026 (UTC) ‡ National team caps and goals as of 16:39, 17 February 2025 (UTC)

Gabriel Silva Moscardo de Salles (born 28 September 2005), known as Gabriel Moscardo, is a Brazilian professional footballer who plays as a defensive midfielder for La Liga club Espanyol, on loan from Ligue 1 club Paris Saint-Germain.

== Club career ==
=== Corinthians ===
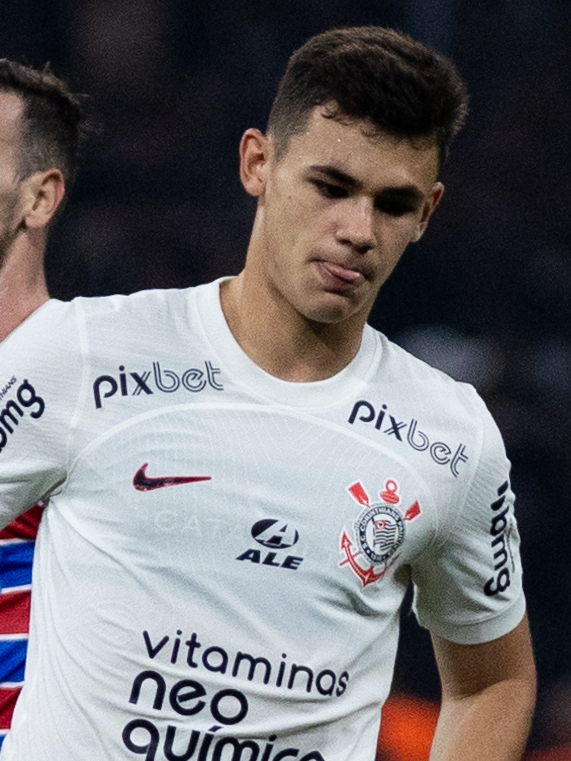
Moscardo playing for Corinthians in 2023

Born in Taubaté, Moscardo began playing with Atleta Cidadão in 2015, and joined Corinthians' youth setup in 2017. He made his first team debut on 28 June 2023, coming on as a second-half substitute for Giuliano in a 3–0 home win over Liverpool in the Copa Libertadores. Moscardo made his Série A debut on 2 July 2023, starting in a 1–0 home loss against Red Bull Bragantino.

=== Paris Saint-Germain ===
On 25 January 2024, Moscardo signed a four-and-a-half-year contract with Ligue 1 club Paris Saint-Germain (PSG). The Parisians paid a reported €20 million transfer fee. Following the agreement with Paris Saint-Germain, Moscardo was immediately loaned back to Corinthians until June 2024.

On 21 August 2024, Moscardo was loaned to fellow Ligue 1 club Reims for the 2024–25 season. He returned to PSG on 10 June 2025, joining the squad for the 2025 FIFA Club World Cup. On 19 July, he was loaned out to Primeira Liga club Braga for the 2025–26 season.

On 8 July 2026, Moscardo moved to La Liga side Espanyol on a one-year loan deal.

== International career ==
In September 2023, Moscardo was called up to the Brazil U23s for a set of friendly matches.

== Career statistics ==
As of 31 October 2026

Appearances and goals by club, season, and competition
| Club | Season | League | | | Cup | | Continental | | Other | | Total | |
| Club | Season | Division | Apps | Goals | Apps | Goals | Apps | Goals | Apps | Goals | Apps | Goals |
|---|---|---|---|---|---|---|---|---|---|---|---|---|
| Corinthians | 2023 | Série A | 18 | 1 | 2 | 0 | 5 (Note: One appearance in Copa Libertadores, four appearances in Copa Sudamericana) | 0 | 0 | 0 | 25 | 1 |
| Corinthians | 2024 (Note: On loan from Paris Saint-Germain) | Série A | 2 | 0 | 0 | 0 | 0 | 0 | 0 | 0 | 2 | 0 |
| Corinthians | Total | | 20 | 1 | 2 | 0 | 5 | 0 | 0 | 0 | 27 | 1 |
| Reims (loan) | 2024–25 | Ligue 1 | 6 | 0 | 3 | 1 | — | | 1 (Note: Appearance in Ligue 1 relegation/promotion play-offs) | 0 | 10 | 1 |
| Braga (loan) | 2025–26 | Primeira Liga | 23 | 0 | 3 | 0 | 11 (Note: Appearances in UEFA Europa League) | 0 | 2 (Note: Appearances in Taça da Liga) | 1 | 39 | 1 |
| Espanyol (loan) | 2026–27 | La Liga | 6 | 0 | 1 | 1 | — | | — | | 7 | 1 |
| Career total | | | 55 | 1 | 9 | 2 | 16 | 0 | 3 | 1 | 83 | 4 |

== Honours ==
Reims

- Coupe de France runner-up: 2024–25

Paris Saint-Germain

- FIFA Club World Cup runner-up: 2025

Brazil U20

- South American Youth Football Championship: 2025
