= Yehvann Diouf =

Footballer (born 1999)

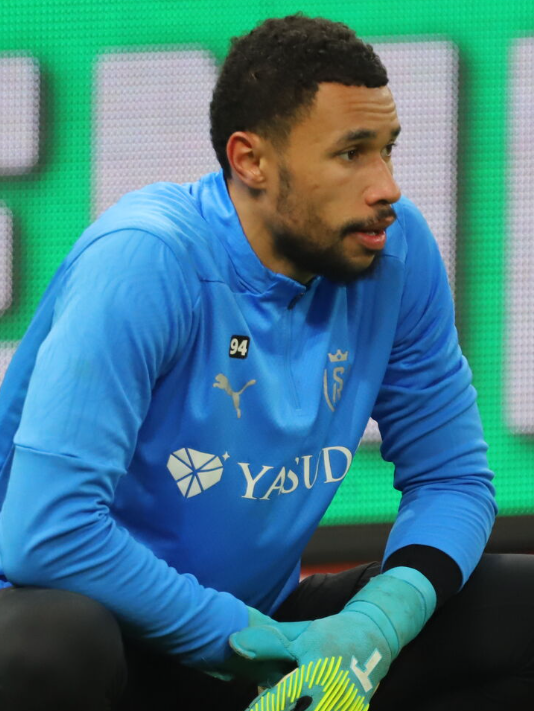
- Diouf with Reims in 2025

Personal information
- Full name: Yehvann Djibril Victor Diouf
- Date of birth: 16 November 1999 (age 27)
- Place of birth: Montreuil, France
- Height: 1.88 m (6 ft 2 in)
- Position: Goalkeeper

Team information
- Current team: Nice
- Number: 23

Youth career
- 2005–2010: Champigny
- 2010–2012: Créteil
- 2012–2016: Troyes

Senior career*
Years	Team	Apps	(Gls)
2016–2019	Troyes II	43	(0)
2019	Troyes	1	(0)
2019–2022	Reims II	24	(0)
2020–2025	Reims	101	(0)
2025–	Nice	33	(0)

International career^{‡}
2017	France U18	3	(1)
2017–2018	France U19	10	(0)
2018	France U20	2	(0)
2025–	Senegal	6	(0)
Medal record
Men's football
Representing Senegal
Africa Cup of Nations
Runner-up	2025 Morocco
- * Club domestic league appearances and goals as of 22:40, 18 October 2026 (UTC) ‡ National team caps and goals as of 16 November 2026

Yehvann Djibril Victor Diouf (born 16 November 1999) is a professional footballer who plays as a goalkeeper for Ligue 1 club Nice. Born in France, he plays for the Senegal national team.

== Club career ==
On 8 September 2016, Diouf became the youngest ever player to sign a professional contract with Troyes, at the age of 16 years and 297 days. He made his professional debut for Troyes in a 0–0 Ligue 2 tie with Ajaccio on 17 May 2019.

Diouf signed a four-year contract to join Reims starting 1 July 2019.

On 3 July 2025, it was announced that Diouf would sign for fellow Ligue 1 club Nice for a fee of €7 million.

== International career ==
Born in France, Diouf is of Senegalese and Polish descent through his father and mother, respectively. He represented the France U19s at the 2018 UEFA European Under-19 Championship.

On 19 March 2025, Diouf's request to switch international allegiance to Senegal was approved by FIFA.

On May 21, 2026, Diouf was officially selected by Senegal's coach Pape Thiaw from his list of 28 players to participate in the 2026 FIFA World Cup.

== Career statistics ==
=== Club ===
As of match played 18 October 2026

Appearances and goals by club, season and competition
Club	Season	League			Coupe de France		Europe		Other		Total	
Club	Season	Division	Apps	Goals	Apps	Goals	Apps	Goals	Apps	Goals	Apps	Goals
Troyes II	2016–17	Championnat National 2	18	0	—		—		—		18	0
Troyes II	2017–18	Championnat National 2	14	0	—		—		—		14	0
Troyes II	2018–19	Championnat National 2	11	0	—		—		—		11	0
Troyes II	Total		43	0	—		—		—		43	0
Troyes	2016–17	Ligue 2	0	0	0	0	—		—		0	0
Troyes	2017–18	Ligue 1	0	0	0	0	—		—		0	0
Troyes	2018–19	Ligue 2	1	0	0	0	—		0	0	1	0
Troyes	Total		1	0	0	0	—		0	0	1	0
Reims II	2019–20	Championnat National 1	16	0	—		—		—		16	0
Reims II	2020–21	Championnat National 1	2	0	—		—		—		2	0
Reims II	2021–22	Championnat National 1	5	0	—		—		—		5	0
Reims II	2022–23	Championnat National 1	1	0	—		—		—		1	0
Reims II	Total		24	0	—		—		—		24	0
Reims	2019–20	Ligue 1	0	0	0	0	—		—		0	0
Reims	2020–21	Ligue 1	2	0	1	0	0	0	—		3	0
Reims	2021–22	Ligue 1	0	0	3	0	—		—		3	0
Reims	2022–23	Ligue 1	31	0	3	0	—		—		34	0
Reims	2023–24	Ligue 1	34	0	0	0	—		—		34	0
Reims	2024–25	Ligue 1	34	0	5	0	—		2 (Note: Appearances in Ligue 1 relegation/promotion play-offs)	0	41	0
Reims	Total		101	0	12	0	0	0	2	0	115	0
Nice	2025–26	Ligue 1	26	0	2	0	8 (Note: Two appearances in UEFA Champions League, six appearances in UEFA Europa League)	0	2	0	38	0
Nice	2026–27	Ligue 1	7	0	0	0	—		—		7	0
Nice	Total		33	0	2	0	8	0	2	0	45	0
Career total			202	0	14	0	8	0	4	0	228	0

=== International ===
As of match played 16 November 2026

Appearances and goals by national team and year
National team	Year	Apps	Goals
Senegal	2025	1	0
Senegal	2026	5	0
Total		6	0

== Honours ==
Reims

- Coupe de France runner-up: 2024–25

Nice

- Coupe de France runner-up: 2025–26

Senegal

- Africa Cup of Nations runner-up: 2025
