= Oumar Diakité =

Ivorian footballer (born 2003)

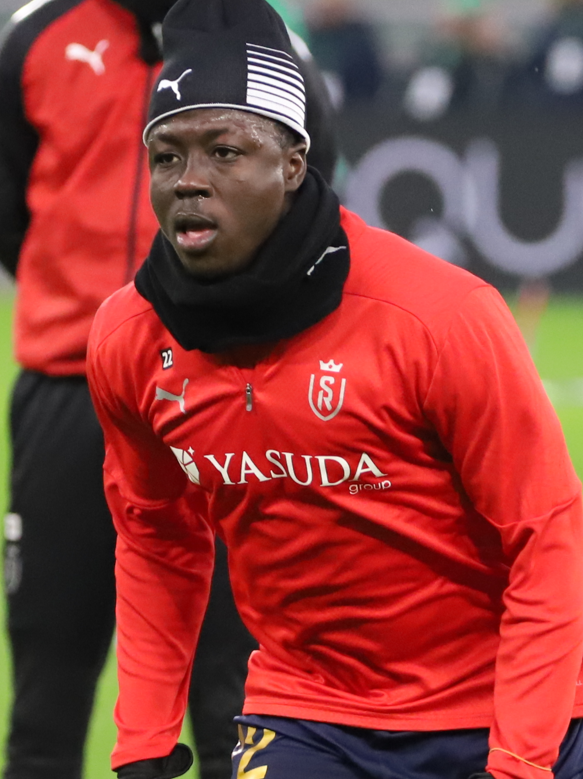
- Diakité with Reims in 2025

Personal information
- Date of birth: 20 December 2003 (age 22)
- Place of birth: Bingerville, Ivory Coast
- Height: 1.82 m (6 ft 0 in)
- Position: Forward

Team information
- Current team: Sturm Graz (on loan from Reims)
- Number: 14

Youth career
- ASEC Mimosas

Senior career*
Years	Team	Apps	(Gls)
2020–2022	ASEC Mimosas		
2022–2023	Red Bull Salzburg	0	(0)
2022–2023	→ Liefering (loan)	35	(12)
2023–	Reims	56	(9)
2025–2026	→ Cercle Brugge (loan)	25	(7)
2026–	→ Sturm Graz (loan)	5	(6)

International career^{‡}
2023–	Ivory Coast	32	(6)
Medal record
Representing Ivory Coast
Men's football
Africa Cup of Nations
Winner	2023 Ivory Coast
- * Club domestic league appearances and goals as of 21:07, 25 October 2026 (UTC) ‡ National team caps and goals as of 19:10, 30 June 2026 (UTC)

Oumar Diakité (born 20 December 2003) is an Ivorian professional footballer who plays as a forward for Austrian Bundesliga club Sturm Graz, on loan from French club Reims, and the Ivory Coast national team.

== Club career ==
Diakité joined Red Bull Salzburg from ASEC Mimosas on 12 January 2022 and was quickly sent on loan to Red Bull Salzburg's farm team, Liefering. He made his debut in a league match against SKN St. Pölten in 20 February. Diakité scored his first goal against SK Rapid Wien II in the league match on 3 April.

On 21 June 2023, Diakité signed up for Ligue 1 club Stade de Reims on a five-year contract.

Diakité scored his first goal for Stade de Reims on 3 September 2023, in a Ligue 1 match against FC Metz. He was named in the starting lineup, and the match ended in a 2–2 draw.

On 10 March 2024, Diakité scored the equalising goal against Paris Saint-Germain, bringing the score to 2–2. He was later voted Reims Player of the Match by the club's supporters.

On 5 September 2025, Diakité joined Belgian Pro League side Cercle Brugge on loan for one year, with an option for a permanent transfer.

On 2 September 2026, Diakité joined Austrian Bundesliga club SK Sturm Graz on loan for the 2026–27 season.

== International career ==
Diakité was called up to the Ivory Coast for a set of 2023 Africa Cup of Nations qualification matches in June 2022. He was removed from the squad on 6 June 2022, with a minor injury in training. He debuted in a 1–0 win over Lesotho on 9 September 2023.

In December 2023, he was named in the 27-man squad for the 2023 Africa Cup of Nations hosted in Ivory Coast. During the quarter-final match against Mali, he scored the winning goal in the stoppage time of extra time, securing a 2–1 victory and qualification to the semi-finals, which he would miss due to receiving a second yellow card following his celebration.

Diakité was included in the list of Ivorian players selected by coach Emerse Faé to participate in the 2025 Africa Cup of Nations.

On May 15, 2026, Diakité was integrated by Ivory Coast coach Emerse Faé in his list of 26 players in order to participate in the 2026 World Cup.

== Career statistics ==
=== Club ===
As of match played 29 October 2026

Appearances and goals by club, season and competition
Club	Season	League			National cup (Note: Includes Coupe de France, Belgian Cup, Austrian Cup)		Europe		Other		Total	
Club	Season	Division	Apps	Goals	Apps	Goals	Apps	Goals	Apps	Goals	Apps	Goals
Red Bull Salzburg	2021–22	Bundesliga	0	0	0	0	—		—		0	0
Liefering (loan)	2021–22	2. Liga	12	3	—		—		—		12	3
Liefering (loan)	2022–23	2. Liga	23	9	—		—		—		23	9
Liefering (loan)	Total		35	12	—		—		—		35	12
Reims	2023–24	Ligue 1	28	5	0	0	—		—		28	5
Reims	2024–25	Ligue 1	26	4	5	0	—		2 (Note: Appearances in Ligue 1 relegation/promotion play-offs)	0	33	4
Reims	2025–26	Ligue 2	2	0	0	0	—		—		2	0
Reims	Total		56	9	5	0	—		2	0	63	9
Cercle Brugge	2025–26	Belgian Pro League	25	7	1	0	—		—		26	7
Sturm Graz (loan)	2026–27	Austrian Bundesliga	5	6	1	0	3 (Note: Appearances in UEFA Europa League)	1	—		9	7
Career total			121	34	7	0	3	1	2	0	133	35

=== International ===
As of match played 30 June 2026

Appearances and goals by national team and year
National team	Year	Apps	Goals
Ivory Coast	2023	5	0
Ivory Coast	2024	16	5
Ivory Coast	2025	7	1
Ivory Coast	2026	4	0
Total		32	6

Scores and results list Ivory Coast's goal tally first, score column indicates score after each Diakité goal.

List of international goals scored by Oumar Diakité
No.	Date	Venue	Opponent	Score	Result	Competition	Ref.
1	3 February 2024	Stade de la Paix, Bouaké, Ivory Coast	Mali	2–1	2–1	2023 Africa Cup of Nations	
2	23 March 2024	Stade de la Licorne, Amiens, France	Benin	2–2	2–2	Friendly	
3	10 September 2024	Ahmadou Ahidjo Stadium, Yaoundé, Cameroon	Chad	2–0	2–0	2025 Africa Cup of Nations qualification	
4	11 October 2024	Laurent Pokou Stadium, San-Pédro, Ivory Coast	Sierra Leone	4–1	4–1	2025 Africa Cup of Nations qualification	
5	19 November 2024	Felix Houphouet Boigny Stadium, Abidjan, Ivory Coast	Chad	4–0	4–0	2025 Africa Cup of Nations qualification	
6	10 October 2025	Côte d'Or National Sports Complex, Saint Pierre, Mauritius	Seychelles	3–0	7–0	2026 FIFA World Cup qualification	

== Honours ==
Reims

- Coupe de France runner-up: 2024–25

Ivory Coast

- Africa Cup of Nations: 2023
