= Mamadou Diakhon =

Senegalese footballer (born 2005)

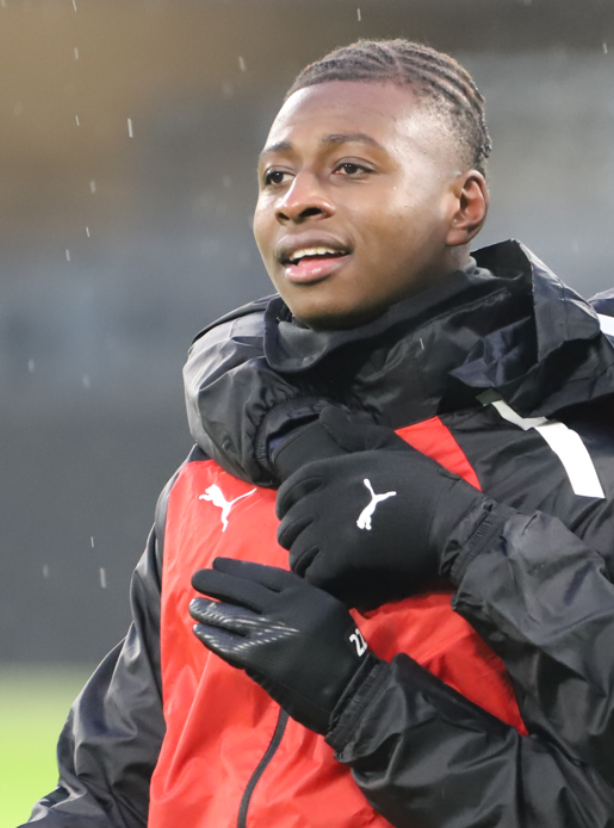
- Diakhon with Reims in 2025

Personal information
- Date of birth: 22 September 2005 (age 21)
- Place of birth: Strasbourg, France
- Height: 1.80 m (5 ft 11 in)
- Position: Forward

Team information
- Current team: Club Brugge
- Number: 67

Youth career
- 2014–2022: Reims

Senior career*
Years	Team	Apps	(Gls)
2022–2023	Reims B	29	(2)
2023–2025	Reims	42	(3)
2025–	Club Brugge	31	(1)

International career^{‡}
2023	France U18	6	(1)
2023–2024	France U19	13	(1)
2024	France U20	4	(0)
2026–	Senegal	2	(0)
- * Club domestic league appearances and goals as of 31 October 2026 ‡ National team caps and goals as of 23:09, 4 October 2026 (UTC)

Mamadou Diakhon (born 22 September 2005) is a professional footballer who plays as a forward for Belgian Pro League club Club Brugge. Born in France, he plays for the Senegal national team.

== Club career ==
Born in Strasbourg, Mamadou Diakhon joined the Reims academy in 2021.

On 27 May 2023, he made his professional debut for Reims in a Ligue 1 match against Olympique Lyon, before signing his first professional contract with the club in summer 2023.

On 18 August 2025, Diakhon joined Belgian Pro League side Club Brugge for a reported transfer fee of €8.5 million, signing a four-year contract.

== International career ==
Born in France, Diakhon is of Senegalese and Malian descent.

He is a youth international for France, first receiving a call up to the under-18 squad in March 2023. He made his France U18 debut during a 4-3 friendly win against Germany, where he also scored his first goal. He was subsequently called up for the Maurice Revello Tournament.

Diakohn opted to play for the Senegal national team in March 2026. He debuted for Senegal in a friendly 3–1 win over The Gambia on 30 March 2026.

== Career statistics ==
=== Club ===
As of match played 31 October 2026

Appearances and goals by club, season and competition
Club	Season	League			National cup (Note: Includes Coupe de France, Belgian Cup)		Europe		Other		Total	
Club	Season	Division	Apps	Goals	Apps	Goals	Apps	Goals	Apps	Goals	Apps	Goals
Reims B	2022–23	CFA	25	2	—		—		—		25	2
Reims B	2023–24	CFA	4	0	—		—		—		4	0
Reims B	Total		29	2	—		—		—		29	2
Reims	2022–23	Ligue 1	2	0	—		—		—		2	0
Reims	2023–24	Ligue 1	11	0	2	2	—		—		13	2
Reims	2024–25	Ligue 1	28	2	6	1	—		1 (Note: Appearance in Ligue 1 relegation/promotion play-offs)	0	35	3
Reims	2025–26	Ligue 2	1	1	0	0	—		—		1	1
Reims	Total		42	3	8	3	—		1	0	51	6
Club Brugge KV	2025–26	Belgian Pro League	22	0	1	0	11 (Note: Appearances in UEFA Champions League)	2	—		34	2
Club Brugge KV	2026–27	Belgian Pro League	9	1	1	0	3	0	1 (Note: Appearance in Belgian Super Cup)	0	14	1
Club Brugge KV	Total		31	1	2	0	14	2	1	0	48	3
Career total			102	6	10	3	14	2	2	0	128	11

== Honours ==
Reims

- Coupe de France runner-up: 2024–25
