= Maiky de la Cruz =

Ecuadorian footballer (born 2004)

Personal information
- Full name: Maiky Jordan de la Cruz Borja
- Date of birth: 13 August 2004 (age 22)
- Place of birth: Cuenca, Ecuador
- Height: 1.68 m (5 ft 6 in)
- Position: Left-back

Team information
- Current team: Stade de Reims B

Youth career
- C.D. Cuenca
- L.D.U. Quito

Senior career*
Years	Team	Apps	(Gls)
2020–2022	L.D.U. Quito	1	(0)
2020	→ Atlético Kin (loan)		
2022–	Stade de Reims B	18	(0)
2023–2024	→ UT Pétange (loan)	10	(0)

International career^{‡}
2019	Ecuador U16	2	(0)
- * Club domestic league appearances and goals as of 7 December 2024 ‡ National team caps and goals as of 16:53, 7 October 2021 (UTC)

Maiky Jordan de la Cruz Borja (born 13 August 2004) is an Ecuadorian footballer who currently plays as a left-back for French Championnat National 3 club Stade de Reims B.

== Club career ==
Born in Cuenca, Ecuador, de la Cruz started his career with local side C.D. Cuenca at the age of eight, before joining L.D.U. Quito. While at Quito, he was named by English newspaper The Guardian as one of the best players born in 2004 worldwide.

Having made one appearance for Quito, he was linked with a move to French side Stade de Reims in February 2022. He made the move official in August of the same year, signing a four-year contract.

== Personal life ==
De La Cruz is the nephew of former footballer Ulises de la Cruz.

== Career statistics ==
=== Club ===
As of 23 January 2023.

Appearances and goals by club, season and competition
Club	Season	League			Cup		Continental		Other		Total	
Club	Season	Division	Apps	Goals	Apps	Goals	Apps	Goals	Apps	Goals	Apps	Goals
L.D.U. Quito	2020	Serie A	0	0	0	0	0	0	0	0	0	0
L.D.U. Quito	2021	Serie A	1	0	0	0	0	0	0	0	1	0
L.D.U. Quito	2022	Serie A	0	0	0	0	0	0	0	0	0	0
L.D.U. Quito	Total		1	0	0	0	0	0	0	0	1	0
Stade de Reims B	2022–23	Championnat National 2	3	0	–		–		0	0	3	0
Career total			4	0	0	0	0	0	0	0	4	0
