= Yaya Fofana =

Ivorian footballer (born 2004)

Personal information
- Full name: Yaya Kader Fofana
- Date of birth: 12 June 2004 (age 22)
- Place of birth: Abidjan, Ivory Coast
- Height: 1.80 m (5 ft 11 in)
- Position: Midfielder

Team information
- Current team: Reims
- Number: 8

Youth career
- –2022: Afrique Football Élite

Senior career*
Years	Team	Apps	(Gls)
2022–2023	Lens B	10	(1)
2023–	Reims B	12	(9)
2024–	Reims	21	(1)
- * Club domestic league appearances and goals as of 11 May 2026

Yaya Kader Fofana (born 12 June 2004) is an Ivorian professional footballer who plays as a midfielder for Ligue 2 club Reims.

== Career ==
A product of Afrique Football Élite, Fofana joined Lens in 2022, joining the club's reserve team in the Championnat National 3. On 11 June 2023, he signed for Reims's reserve team in the same division. Fofana became a standout performer for the reserve side, and eventually made his professional debut in Ligue 1 on 4 February 2024 in a 3–2 home defeat to Toulouse.

On 25 August 2024, Fofana made his first professional start in a match away to Marseille. He went on to score Reims's second goal of the match in a 2–2 draw, a goal that was described as "quite simply sublime" by L'Équipe.
