= Ange Martial Tia =

Malian footballer (born 2006)

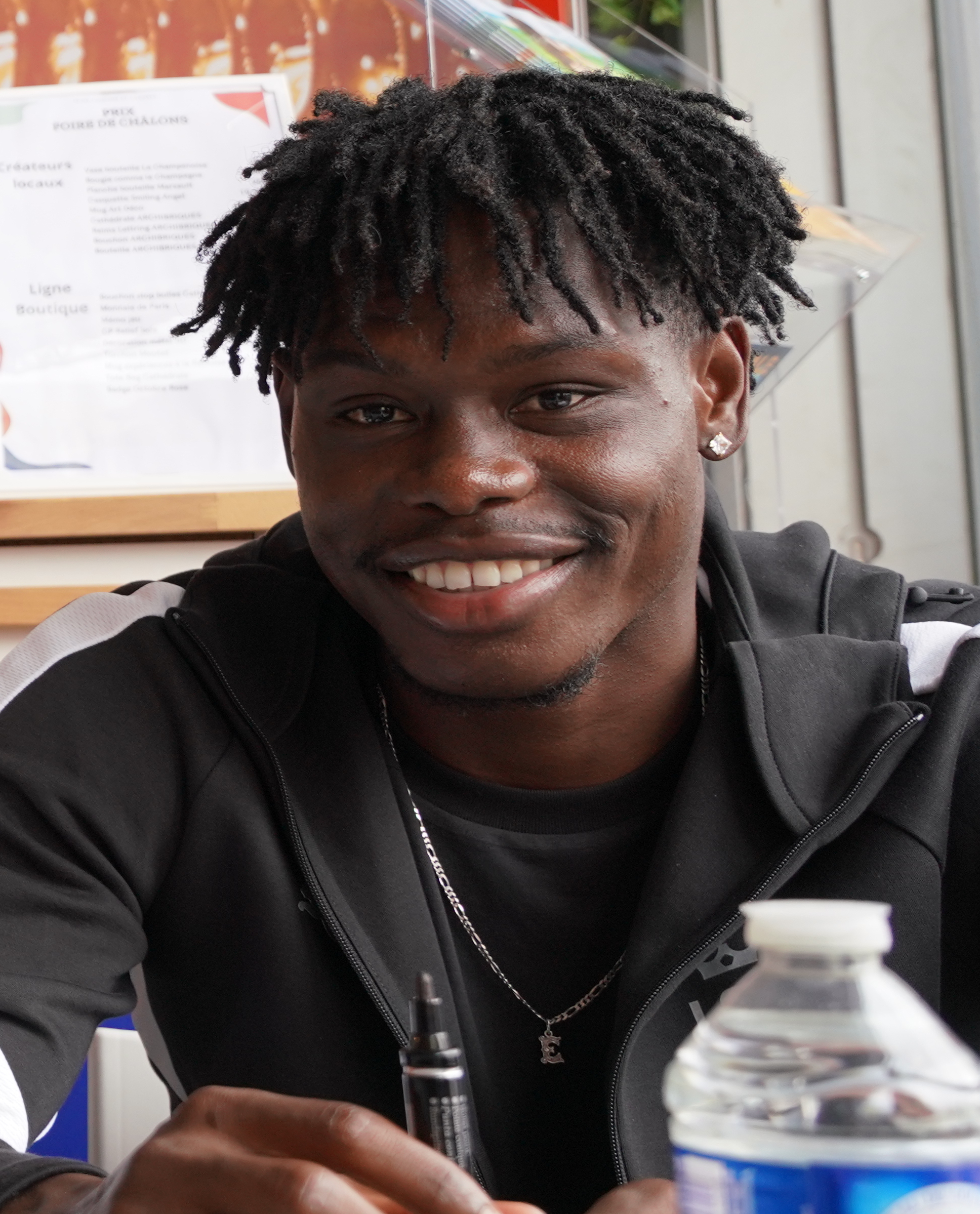
- Tia in 2025

Personal information
- Date of birth: 20 November 2006 (age 19)
- Height: 1.78 m (5 ft 10 in)
- Position: Midfielder

Team information
- Current team: Reims
- Number: 87

Youth career
- –2025: Afrique Football Élite

Senior career*
Years	Team	Apps	(Gls)
2025	Reims B	1	(0)
2025–	Reims	44	(6)

International career^{‡}
2023	Mali U17	11	(2)
2025	Mali U23	3	(0)
2026–	Mali	3	(2)
- * Club domestic league appearances and goals as of 18:24, 19 September 2026 (UTC) ‡ National team caps and goals as of 21:00, 4 October 2026 (UTC)

Ange Martial Tia (born 20 November 2006) is a Malian professional footballer who plays as a midfielder for Ligue 2 club Reims and the Mali national team.

== Club career ==
Tia developed at Malian club Afrique Football Élite before attracting international interest following his performances at the 2023 FIFA U-17 World Cup. He was notably linked with Belgian club Anderlecht, but ultimately joined French side Reims in February 2025, initially integrating their reserve squad. He made his first-team debut in a 2–0 Ligue 1 defeat to Auxerre on 9 March 2025. On 29 May 2025, he scored in Reims's 3–1 play-off defeat to Metz, a result synonymous with relegation to Ligue 2.

== International career ==
Tia represented Mali at the 2023 U-17 Africa Cup of Nations and the 2023 FIFA U-17 World Cup. He featured prominently throughout the U-17 World Cup, scoring two goals in eleven appearances. Mali reached the semi-finals of the competition.

== Career statistics ==
=== Club ===
As of match played 19 September 2025

Appearances and goals by club, season and competition
Club	Season	League			Cup		Other		Total	
Club	Season	Division	Apps	Goals	Apps	Goals	Apps	Goals	Apps	Goals
Reims	2024–25	Ligue 1	6	0	2	0	2 (Note: Appearances in Ligue 1 relegation/promotion play-offs)	1	10	1
Reims	2025–26	Ligue 2	31	5	4	0	—		35	5
Reims	2026–27	Ligue 2	7	1	0	0	—		7	1
Reims	Total		44	6	6	0	2	1	52	7
Reims B	2024–25	National 3	1	0	—		—		1	0
Career total			45	6	6	0	2	1	53	7

=== International ===
As of match played 4 October 2026

Appearances and goals by national team and year
National team	Year	Apps	Goals
Mali	2026	3	2
Total		3	2

Scores and results list Mali's goal tally first, score column indicates score after each Tia goal.

List of international goals scored by Ange Martial Tia
No.	Date	Venue	Opponent	Score	Result	Competition
1	25 September 2026	26 March Stadium, Bamako, Mali	Cape Verde	1–0	3–1	2027 Africa Cup of Nations qualification
2	29 September 2026	Samuel Kanyon Doe Sports Complex, Paynesville, Liberia	Liberia	1–0	1–0	2027 Africa Cup of Nations qualification

== Honours ==
Reims

- Coupe de France runner-up: 2024–25
