= Afrique Football Élite =

Football club in Bamako, Mali

- Short name: AFE
- League: Malien Première Division
- 2025–26: 11th
| Home colours | Away colours | Third colours |

Afrique Football Élite is a football club located in Bamako, Mali. They currently play in the Malian Première Division, the top tier of Malian football.

In the 2018 Malian Cup, AFE reached the semi-finals of the competition before being eliminated by Djoliba in a 1–0 defeat.

In the 2021 season, AFE topped their group in the Bamako district league and qualified for the league play-off, finishing second behind Guidars FC; however, Guidars pulled out of the promotion play-off and were replaced by AFE, before AFE ultimately gained promotion to the Malian Première Division alongside US Bougouba.

== Notable players ==
- Nadjib Cissé
- Yaya Fofana
- Amadou Koné
- Ange Martial Tia
- El Bilal Touré
- Moïse Sahi Dion
