= Thibault De Smet =

Belgian footballer (born 1998)

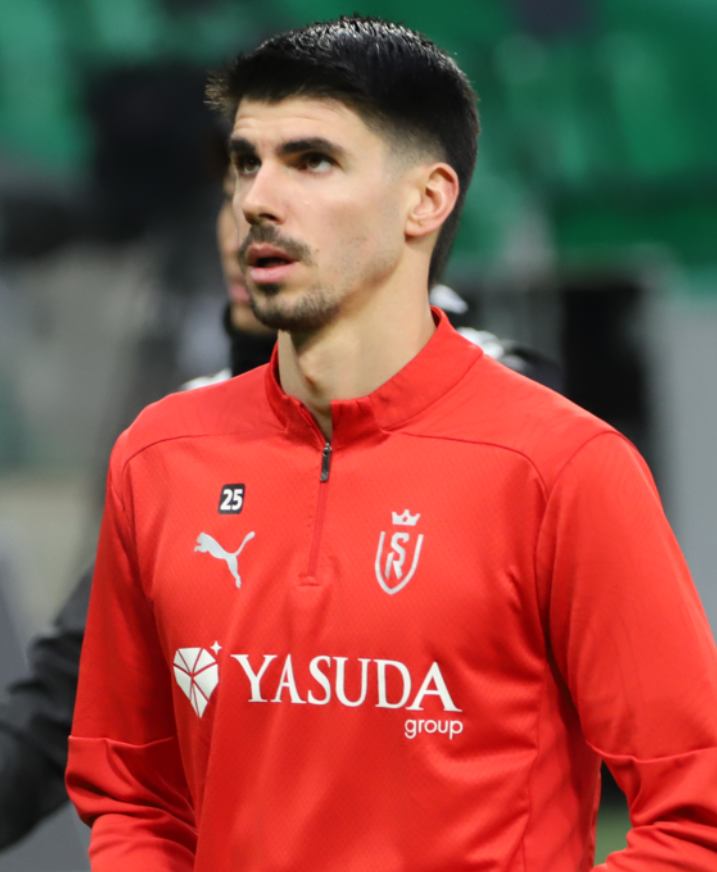
- De Smet with Reims in 2025

Personal information
- Date of birth: 5 June 1998 (age 28)
- Place of birth: Bruges, Belgium
- Height: 1.83 m (6 ft 0 in)
- Position: Left-back

Team information
- Current team: Paris FC
- Number: 28

Youth career
- Gent

Senior career*
Years	Team	Apps	(Gls)
2016–2019	Gent	9	(1)
2019–2020	Sint-Truiden	12	(0)
2020–2025	Reims	62	(0)
2021–2022	→ Beerschot (loan)	24	(0)
2025	→ Paris FC (loan)	15	(0)
2025–	Paris FC	17	(0)

International career
2014–2015	Belgium U17	5	(0)
2016–2017	Belgium U19	5	(1)
2019–2020	Belgium U21	8	(1)
- * Club domestic league appearances and goals as of 19 May 2026

Thibault De Smet (born 5 June 1998) is a Belgian professional footballer who plays as left-back for Ligue 1 club Paris FC.

== Club career ==
On 16 January 2025, De Smet transferred to Paris FC. The transfer is technically a loan for the first half-season, followed by an obligation to buy. De Smet signed a contract until 2027.

== Honours ==
Reims

- Coupe de France runner-up: 2024–25
