= Ligue 1 relegation/promotion play-offs =

Playoffs in French football that determine relegation and promotion

The Ligue 1 relegation/promotion playoffs, known in French as the Barrages (transl. play-offs), is an annual play-off fixture in French football contested by the 16th-placed team in Ligue 1 and the winner of the Ligue 2 promotion play-offs. It takes place after the completion of the regular season and is administered by Ligue de Football Professionnel. Play-offs are a two-legged tie and the winner is decided by aggregate score. Play-offs were originally introduced in the 2015–16 season but due to legal issues it was adopted in the 2016–17 season, even though similar play-offs were played until 1993 when Ligue 1 was named Division 1. The first leg of play-offs are played on the home ground of the Ligue 2 club with the return leg at the home of the Ligue 1 club.

== Results ==
=== 2016–17 season ===
The 2016–17 season saw the return of the Ligue 1 relegation/promotion play-offs, held between the 18th-placed Ligue 1 team, Lorient, and the 3rd-placed Ligue 2 team, Troyes, on a two-legged confrontation.

1st leg

25 May 2017
20:45 CEST

Troyes	2–1	Lorient
Darbion 37'; Nivet 90+1'	Report	Waris 82'

Stade de l'Aube, Troyes
Attendance: 14,081
Referee: Ruddy Buquet

2nd leg

28 May 2017
21:00 CEST

Lorient	0–0	Troyes
	Report

Stade du Moustoir, Lorient
Attendance: 16,000
Referee: Clément Turpin

Troyes won 2–1 on aggregate and were promoted to the 2017–18 Ligue 1; Lorient were relegated to the 2017–18 Ligue 2.

=== 2017–18 season ===
The 2017–18 season ended with a relegation play-off between the 18th-placed Ligue 1 team, Toulouse, and the 3rd-placed Ligue 2 team, Ajaccio, on a two-legged confrontation.

1st leg

23 May 2018
20:45 CEST

Ajaccio	0–3	Toulouse
	Report	Gradel 45+3'; Jullien 51'; Sanogo 65'

Stade de la Mosson, Montpellier
Attendance: 0 (Behind closed doors)
Referee: Ruddy Buquet

2nd leg

27 May 2018
21:00 CEST

Toulouse	1–0	Ajaccio
Durmaz 88'	Report

Stadium Municipal, Toulouse
Attendance: 16,519
Referee: Benoît Bastien

Toulouse won 4–0 on aggregate and therefore both clubs remained in their respective leagues.

=== 2018–19 season ===
The 2018–19 season ended with a relegation play-off between the 18th-placed Ligue 1 team, Dijon, and the 3rd-placed Ligue 2 team, Lens, on a two-legged confrontation.

1st leg

30 May 2019
20:45 CEST

Lens	1–1	Dijon
Bellegarde 49'	Report	Kwon Chang-hoon 81'

Stade Bollaert-Delelis, Lens
Attendance: 37,355
Referee: Amaury Delerue

2nd leg

2 June 2019
21:15 CEST

Dijon	3–1	Lens
Sliti 28', 90'; Saïd 70'	Report	Duverne 39'

Stade Gaston Gérard, Dijon
Attendance: 15,367
Referee: Ruddy Buquet

Dijon won 4–2 on aggregate and therefore both clubs remained in their respective leagues.

=== 2019–20 season ===
The leagues were suspended in March 2020 due to COVID-19 pandemic in France. No playoffs were played. The teams in the play-off positions at the time of suspension (Nîmes from Ligue 1 and Ajaccio from Ligue 2) remained in their respective leagues.

=== 2020–21 season ===
The 2020–21 season ended with a relegation play-off between the 18th-placed Ligue 1 team, Nantes, and the winner of the semi-final of the Ligue 2 play-off, Toulouse, on a two-legged confrontation.

1st leg

27 May 2021
20:45 CEST

Toulouse	1–2	Nantes
Machado 19'	Report	Blas 10'; Kolo Muani 22'

Stadium de Toulouse, Toulouse
Attendance: 0 (Behind closed doors)
Referee: Jérémie Pignard

2nd leg

30 May 2021
18:00 CEST

Nantes	0–1	Toulouse
	Report	Bayo 62'

Stade de la Beaujoire, Nantes
Attendance: 0 (Behind closed doors)
Referee: Benoît Bastien

2–2 on aggregate. Nantes won on away goals and therefore both clubs remained in their respective leagues.

=== 2021–22 season ===
The 2021–22 season ended with a relegation play-off between the 18th-placed Ligue 1 team, Saint-Étienne, and the winner of the semi-final of the Ligue 2 play-off, Auxerre, on a two-legged confrontation.

1st leg

26 May 2022
19:00 CEST

Auxerre	1–1	Saint-Étienne
Perrin 87'	Report	Youssouf 15'

Stade de l'Abbé-Deschamps, Auxerre
Attendance: 17,479
Referee: Benoît Millot

2nd leg

29 May 2022
19:00 CEST

Saint-Étienne	1–1 (a.e.t.)	Auxerre
Camara 76'	Report	Sakhi 51'
Penalties
Boudebouz (penalty missed); Nordin (penalty scored); Trauco (penalty scored); Dioussé (penalty scored); Bouanga (penalty scored)	4–5	(penalty scored) Dugimont; (penalty scored) Jubal; (penalty scored) Perrin; (penalty scored) Charbonnier; (penalty scored) Touré

Stade Geoffroy-Guichard, Saint-Étienne
Attendance: 24,489
Referee: Antony Gautier

2–2 on aggregate. Auxerre won 5–4 on penalties and were promoted to the 2022–23 Ligue 1; Saint-Étienne were relegated to the 2022–23 Ligue 2.

=== 2022–23 season ===
No playoffs took place in 2022–23 due to the restructuring of the French football pyramid. 4 teams were relegated from Ligue 1 while only 2 were promoted from Ligue 2.

=== 2023–24 season ===
The 2023–24 season ended with a relegation play-off between the 16th-placed Ligue 1 team, Metz, and the winner of the semi-final of the Ligue 2 play-off, Saint-Étienne, on a two-legged confrontation.

1st leg

30 May 2024
20:30 CEST

Saint-Étienne	2–1	Metz
Sissoko 19'; Cardona 80'	Report	Traoré 45'

Stade Geoffroy-Guichard, Saint-Étienne
Attendance: 35,356
Referee: Benoît Millot

2nd leg

2 June 2024
17:00 CEST

Metz	2–2 (a.e.t.)	Saint-Étienne
Camara 17'; Mikautadze 25' (pen.)	Report	Pétrot 35'; Wadji 116'

Stade Saint-Symphorien, Longeville-lès-Metz
Attendance: 28,500
Referee: Jérôme Brisard

Saint-Étienne won 4–3 on aggregate and were promoted to the 2024–25 Ligue 1; Metz were relegated to the 2024–25 Ligue 2.

=== 2024–25 season ===
The 2024–25 season ended with a relegation play-off between the 16th-placed Ligue 1 team, Reims, and the winner of the semi-final of the Ligue 2 play-off, Metz, on a two-legged confrontation.

1st leg

21 May 2025
20:00 CEST

Metz	1–1	Reims
Udol 38'	Report	Kipré 52'

Stade Saint-Symphorien, Metz
Attendance: 27,767
Referee: Hakim Ben El Hadj

2nd leg

29 May 2025
20:30 CEST

Reims	1–3 (a.e.t.)	Metz
Tia 57'	Report	Udol 78'; Touré 110'; Hein 114'

Stade Auguste-Delaune, Reims
Attendance: 20,392
Referee: Eric Wattellier

Metz won 4–2 on aggregate and were promoted to the 2025–26 Ligue 1; Reims were relegated to the 2025–26 Ligue 2.

=== 2025–26 season ===
The 2025–26 season ended with a relegation play-off between the 16th-placed Ligue 1 team, Nice, and the winner of the semi-final of the Ligue 2 play-off, Saint-Étienne, on a two-legged confrontation.

1st leg

26 May 2026
20:45 CEST

Saint-Étienne	0–0	Nice
	Report

Stade Geoffroy-Guichard, Saint-Étienne
Attendance: 39,772
Referee: Benoît Bastien

2nd leg

29 May 2026
20:45 CEST

Nice	4–1	Saint-Étienne
Clauss 62'; Boudache 81'; Wahi 87', 90+2'	Report	Davitashvili 79' (pen.)

Allianz Riviera, Nice
Attendance: 0 (Behind closed doors)
Referee: Ruddy Buquet

Nice won 4–1 on aggregate and therefore both clubs remained in their respective leagues.
