= List of French football transfers summer 2026 =

This is a list of French football transfers for the 2026 summer transfer window. Only transfers featuring Ligue 1 and Ligue 2 are listed.

== Ligue 1 ==
Note: Flags indicate national team as has been defined under FIFA eligibility rules. Players may hold more than one non-FIFA nationality.

=== Paris Saint-Germain ===
In:

No.	Pos.	Nation	Player
9	FW	ESP	Ferran Torres (from (Spain) Barcelona)
11	MF	FRA	Maghnes Akliouche (from Monaco)
12	DF	FRA	Lucas Digne (from (England) Aston Villa)
16	GK	ITA	Alessandro Longoni (from (Italy) Milan Futuro)
22	FW	BEL	Mika Godts (from (Netherlands) Ajax)
—	FW	TUN	Khalil Ayari (from (Tunisia) Stade Tunisien, previously on loan)

Out:

No.	Pos.	Nation	Player
9	FW	POR	Gonçalo Ramos (to (Italy) Milan)
19	MF	KOR	Lee Kang-in (to (Spain) Atlético Madrid)
29	FW	FRA	Bradley Barcola (to (England) Liverpool)
49	FW	SEN	Ibrahim Mbaye (to (England) Aston Villa)
89	GK	ITA	Renato Marin (on loan to (Portugal) Nacional)
—	FW	TUN	Khalil Ayari (on loan to Dunkerque)
—	DF	FRA	Yoram Zague (on loan to (Cyprus) Pafos, previously on loan at (Belgium) Eupen)
—	MF	BRA	Gabriel Moscardo (on loan to (Spain) Espanyol, previously on loan at (Portugal) Braga)
—	DF	FRA	Noham Kamara (to Lyon, previously on loan)
—	MF	POR	Renato Sanches (free agent, previously on loan at (Greece) Panathinaikos)
—	FW	FRA	Randal Kolo Muani (to (Italy) Juventus, previously on loan at (England) Tottenham Hotspur)

=== Lens ===
In:

No.	Pos.	Nation	Player
3	DF	POL	Maik Nawrocki (from (Scotland) Celtic, previously on loan at (Germany) Hannover 96)
8	MF	ALG	Yacine Titraoui (from (Belgium) Charleroi)
9	MF	BEL	Thorgan Hazard (from (Belgium) Anderlecht)
20	DF	FRA	Jean-Clair Todibo (on loan from (England) West Ham United)
22	MF	POL	Michał Skóraś (from (Belgium) Gent)
23	DF	KSA	Saud Abdulhamid (from (Italy) Roma, previously on loan)
27	MF	FRA	Michaël Cuisance (from (Germany) Hertha BSC)
28	FW	FRA	Junior Kadile (on loan from (Switzerland) Servette)
29	FW	CRO	Franjo Ivanović (on loan from (Portugal) Benfica)

Out:

No.	Pos.	Nation	Player
8	MF	MLI	Mamadou Sangaré (to (England) Brentford)
9	FW	FRA	Allan Saint-Maximin (to (United States) Charlotte FC)
18	MF	FRA	Fodé Sylla (to (Switzerland) Sion)
20	DF	SEN	Malang Sarr (to (Saudi Arabia) Neom)
22	FW	FRA	Wesley Saïd (to (Qatar) Al-Shamal)
26	MF	FRA	Anthony Bermont (on loan to Angers)
27	DF	COD	Arthur Masuaku (loan return to (England) Sunderland)
28	MF	FRA	Adrien Thomasson (to Rennes)
34	FW	THA	Erawan Garnier (to Bastia)
38	FW	CIV	Rayan Fofana (on loan to Le Havre)
—	GK	ITA	Mattia Fortin (on loan to (Italy) Palermo, previously on loan at (Italy) Padova)
—	GK	BFA	Hervé Koffi (on loan to (Belgium) Union Saint-Gilloise, previously on loan at Angers)
—	FW	GLP	Rémy Labeau Lascary (on loan to Auxerre, previously on loan at Brest)
—	FW	CAF	Goduine Koyalipou (on loan to (Belgium) Kortrijk, previously on loan at Angers)
—	FW	FRA	Gabin Capuano (on loan to Quevilly-Rouen, previously on loan at Boulogne)
—	FW	SWE	Jeremy Agbonifo (on loan to (Poland) Jagiellonia Białystok, previously on loan at (Sweden) Häcken)
—	GK	COM	Yannick Pandor (to Amiens, previously on loan at (Belgium) Francs Borains)
—	DF	ARG	Facundo Medina (to Marseille, previously on loan)
—	MF	MAR	Anass Zaroury (to (Greece) Panathinaikos, previously on loan)
—	MF	NCL	Angelo Fulgini (to (Saudi Arabia) Al-Khaleej, previously on loan at (Saudi Arabia) Al-Taawoun)
—	FW	FRA	Kembo Diliwidi (to (Belgium) Dender, previously on loan at Quevilly-Rouen)

=== Lille ===
In:

No.	Pos.	Nation	Player
2	DF	SUI	Loun Srdanović (from (Switzerland) Servette)
7	FW	FRA	Dilane Bakwa (on loan from (England) Nottingham Forest)
12	GK	PAR	Orlando Gill (from (Argentina) San Lorenzo)
14	MF	DEN	Maurits Kjærgaard (from (Austria) Red Bull Salzburg)
18	FW	JPN	Ayase Ueda (from (Netherlands) Feyenoord)
19	FW	TUR	Başar Önal (from (Netherlands) NEC)
23	DF	FRA	Tanguy Nianzou (from (Spain) Sevilla)

Out:

No.	Pos.	Nation	Player
2	DF	ALG	Aïssa Mandi (to (Spain) Levante)
7	FW	BEL	Matias Fernandez-Pardo (to (England) Newcastle United)
12	DF	BEL	Thomas Meunier (to (England) Sunderland)
14	FW	NOR	Marius Broholm (on loan to (Netherlands) Utrecht)
16	GK	BEL	Arnaud Bodart (to Le Havre)
18	DF	COD	Chancel Mbemba (to (Saudi Arabia) Al-Diriyah)
20	FW	FRA	Noah Edjouma (on loan to Brest)
27	FW	POR	Félix Correia (on loan to (Spain) Sevilla)
30	GK	FRA	Marc-Aurèle Caillard (free agent)
32	MF	MAR	Ayyoub Bouaddi (to (England) Manchester City)
36	DF	FRA	Ousmane Touré (on loan to Dunkerque)
—	DF	POR	Rafael Fernandes (on loan to (Portugal) Marítimo)
—	GK	FRA	Lisandru Olmeta (to (Portugal) Torreense, previously on loan at Bastia)
—	DF	BEL	Vincent Burlet (to (Poland) Cracovia, previously on loan at Boulogne)
—	MF	FRA	Ichem Ferrah (to (Italy) Pisa, previously on loan at (Netherlands) Cambuur)
—	MF	FRA	Ugo Raghouber (to (England) Burnley, previously on loan at (Spain) Levante)
—	FW	GUI	Mohamed Bayo (to (Turkey) Samsunspor, previously on loan at (Turkey) Gaziantep)

=== Lyon ===
In:

No.	Pos.	Nation	Player
2	MF	DEN	Mads Bidstrup (from (Austria) Red Bull Salzburg)
11	FW	JPN	Keito Nakamura (from Reims)
13	DF	SUI	Zachary Athekame (on loan from (Italy) Milan)
17	FW	BEL	Loïs Openda (on loan from (Italy) Juventus)
20	DF	AUT	Felix Bacher (from (Portugal) Estoril)
24	FW	BEL	Julien Duranville (from (Germany) Borussia Dortmund, previously on loan at (Switzerland) Basel)
26	FW	ALG	Kaïl Boudache (from Nice)
76	DF	BFA	Mohamed Ouédraogo (from (Austria) SCR Altach)
85	DF	FRA	Noham Kamara (from Paris Saint-Germain, previously on loan)

Out:

No.	Pos.	Nation	Player
5	MF	BEL	Orel Mangala (on loan to (Spain) Getafe)
7	MF	CZE	Adam Karabec (loan return to (Czech Republic) Sparta Prague)
9	FW	BRA	Endrick (loan return to (Spain) Real Madrid)
11	FW	BEL	Malick Fofana (to (England) Sunderland)
17	FW	POR	Afonso Moreira (to (Germany) Bayer Leverkusen)
18	FW	ALG	Rachid Ghezzal (free agent)
33	DF	NED	Hans Hateboer (loan return to Rennes)
36	DF	MAR	Achraf Laâziri (to (Morocco) Ittihad Tanger)
39	MF	POR	Mathys De Carvalho (to (Saudi Arabia) Al-Diriyah)
77	FW	UKR	Roman Yaremchuk (loan return to (Greece) Olympiacos)
98	DF	ENG	Ainsley Maitland-Niles (to (England) Everton)
—	FW	ALG	Daryll Benlahlou (on loan to Montpellier)
—	MF	FRA	Mahamadou Diawara (on loan to Red Star, previously on loan at (Belgium) Antwerp)
—	FW	FRA	Enzo Molebe (on loan to (Switzerland) Lausanne-Sport, previously on loan at Montpellier)
—	DF	CRO	Duje Ćaleta-Car (to (Italy) Sassuolo, previously on loan at (Spain) Real Sociedad)
—	FW	URU	Martín Satriano (to (Spain) Getafe, previously on loan)

=== Marseille ===
In:

No.	Pos.	Nation	Player
20	MF	CIV	Hamed Traorè (from (England) Bournemouth, previously on loan)
22	DF	USA	Timothy Weah (from (Italy) Juventus, previously on loan)
32	DF	ARG	Facundo Medina (from Lens, previously on loan)

Out:

No.	Pos.	Nation	Player
1	GK	ARG	Gerónimo Rulli (to (England) Manchester City)
5	DF	ARG	Leonardo Balerdi (on loan to (Italy) Roma)
10	FW	ENG	Mason Greenwood (to (Turkey) Fenerbahçe)
11	MF	ENG	Ethan Nwaneri (loan return to (England) Arsenal)
17	FW	GAB	Pierre-Emerick Aubameyang (to (Spain) Deportivo A Coruña)
18	MF	BEL	Arthur Vermeeren (loan return to (Germany) RB Leipzig)
20	MF	CIV	Hamed Traorè (on loan to (Italy) Genoa)
26	MF	MAR	Bilal Nadir (to (Germany) Hamburger SV)
27	MF	NED	Quinten Timber (to (England) Crystal Palace)
28	DF	FRA	Benjamin Pavard (loan return to (Italy) Inter Milan)
32	DF	ARG	Facundo Medina (to (Germany) Bayer Leverkusen)

=== Rennes ===
In:

No.	Pos.	Nation	Player
4	DF	ENG	Charlie Cresswell (on loan from Toulouse)
5	DF	POR	Gonçalo Oliveira (from (Portugal) Benfica B)
12	FW	ESP	Eliezer Mayenda (from (England) Sunderland)
14	DF	USA	Bryan Reynolds (from (Belgium) Westerlo)
16	GK	FRA	Nicolas Lemaître (from Troyes)
22	FW	SEN	Boulaye Dia (on loan from (Italy) Lazio)
28	MF	FRA	Adrien Thomasson (from Lens)
70	FW	FRA	Arnaud Nordin (from (Germany) Mainz 05, previously on loan)
90	FW	SEN	Issa Soumaré (from Le Havre)

Out:

No.	Pos.	Nation	Player
3	DF	FRA	Lilian Brassier (to (Germany) Eintracht Frankfurt)
4	MF	FIN	Glen Kamara (on loan to (England) Queens Park Rangers)
7	FW	SUI	Breel Embolo (to (United States) Atlanta United)
36	DF	GHA	Alidu Seidu (on loan to Nice)
50	GK	FRA	Mathys Silistrie (on loan to Quevilly-Rouen)
65	FW	FRA	Nordan Mukiele (on loan to Montpellier)
71	FW	FRA	Lucas Rosier (on loan to Concarneau)
74	MF	FRA	Paolo Limon (on loan to Villefranche)
77	FW	MAR	Yassir Zabiri (on loan to (Spain) Racing Santander)
97	DF	FRA	Jérémy Jacquet (to (England) Liverpool)
—	MF	CIV	Seko Fofana (reloan to (Portugal) Porto)
—	DF	FRA	Rayan Bamba (on loan to Le Mans, previously on loan at Nancy)
—	DF	SEN	Mikayil Faye (on loan to (Germany) 1. FC Nürnberg, previously on loan at (Italy) Cremonese)
—	MF	WAL	Jordan James (on loan to (England) Wolverhampton Wanderers, previously on loan at (England) Leicester City)
—	DF	NED	Hans Hateboer (free agent, previously on loan at Lyon)
—	DF	GAB	Jonathan Do Marcolino (to Annecy, previously on loan at Bourg-Péronnas)
—	MF	DEN	Albert Grønbæk (to (Germany) Hamburger SV, previously on loan)

=== Monaco ===
In:

No.	Pos.	Nation	Player
7	FW	FRA	Mathys Detourbet (on loan from (England) Manchester City)
11	FW	FRA	Matthis Abline (from Nantes)
20	DF	POR	Flávio Nazinho (from (Belgium) Cercle Brugge)
31	FW	ESP	Ansu Fati (from (Spain) Barcelona, previously on loan)
72	DF	SEN	Sadibou Sané (from Metz)

Out:

No.	Pos.	Nation	Player
5	DF	GER	Thilo Kehrer (on loan to (Netherlands) Ajax)
8	MF	FRA	Paul Pogba (free agent)
11	MF	FRA	Maghnes Akliouche (to Paris Saint-Germain)
12	DF	BRA	Caio Henrique (to (Netherlands) Ajax)
20	DF	FRA	Kassoum Ouattara (to (Turkey) Beşiktaş)
23	MF	FRA	Aladji Bamba (to (England) Newcastle United)
24	MF	CIV	Simon Adingra (loan return to (England) Sunderland)
25	DF	BEL	Wout Faes (loan return to (England) Leicester City)
27	DF	SEN	Krépin Diatta (free agent)
50	GK	FRA	Yann Lienard (on loan to (Belgium) Cercle Brugge)
—	GK	POL	Radosław Majecki (on loan to (Cyprus) Pafos, previously on loan at Brest)
—	FW	FRA	Lucas Michal (on loan to (Belgium) Cercle Brugge, previously on loan at Metz)

=== Strasbourg ===
In:

No.	Pos.	Nation	Player
1	GK	DEN	Filip Jörgensen (on loan from (England) Chelsea)
4	DF	CRC	Jeyland Mitchell (from (Austria) Sturm Graz)
10	MF	USA	Gio Reyna (from (Germany) Borussia Mönchengladbach)
12	GK	POL	Miłosz Piekutowski (from (Poland) Jagiellonia Białystok)
14	MF	POR	Dário Essugo (on loan from (England) Chelsea)
15	DF	ARG	Mateo Del Blanco (from (Argentina) Unión Santa Fe)
16	DF	SWE	Genesis Antwi (on loan from (England) Chelsea)
19	FW	POR	Fábio Baldé (from (Germany) Hamburger SV)
23	MF	POR	Diogo Sousa (from (Portugal) Vitória Guimarães)
26	MF	ENG	Omari Kellyman (from (England) Chelsea, previously on loan at (Wales) Cardiff City)
30	FW	ESP	Jacobo Ortega (from (Spain) Real Madrid B)
31	DF	GER	Karim Coulibaly (from (Germany) Werder Bremen)
36	DF	ESP	Oso (from (Spain) Sevilla)
40	FW	DEN	Conrad Harder (on loan from (Germany) RB Leipzig)
42	FW	BRA	Deivid Washington (from (England) Chelsea)
45	MF	SWE	Benjamin Brantlind (from (Sweden) Göteborg)
—	DF	FRA	Hermann Malonga (from Paris Saint-Germain youth)

Out:

No.	Pos.	Nation	Player
1	GK	SWE	Karl-Johan Johnsson (free agent)
2	DF	IRL	Andrew Omobamidele (on loan to (Belgium) Anderlecht)
3	DF	ENG	Ben Chilwell (to (England) Crystal Palace)
5	DF	ARG	Aarón Anselmino (loan return to (England) Chelsea)
7	MF	BEL	Diego Moreira (to (Italy) Milan)
10	FW	NED	Emmanuel Emegha (to (England) Chelsea)
15	FW	CIV	David Datro Fofana (loan return to (England) Chelsea)
17	MF	FRA	Mathis Amougou (on loan to Toulouse)
18	MF	FRA	Junior Mwanga (to Le Havre)
19	MF	PAR	Julio Enciso (to (England) Ipswich Town)
22	DF	CIV	Guéla Doué (to (Germany) Bayer Leverkusen)
32	MF	ARG	Valentín Barco (to (England) Chelsea)
35	MF	FRA	Idrissa Sabaly (on loan to Red Star)
39	GK	BEL	Mike Penders (loan return to (England) Chelsea)
42	DF	CIV	Abdoul Ouattara (to (England) Ipswich Town)
50	GK	FRA	Stefan Bajić (to (Germany) Alemannia Aachen)
83	MF	POR	Rafael Luís (loan return to (Portugal) Benfica)
—	DF	GUI	Saïdou Sow (on loan from Strasbourg, previously on loan at Clermont)
—	DF	FRA	Soumaïla Coulibaly (on loan to (England) Watford, previously on loan at Brest)
—	FW	FRA	Rayane Messi (on loan to (Saudi Arabia) Al-Ettifaq, previously on loan at (Saudi Arabia) Neom)
—	FW	SRB	Miloš Luković (on loan to (Germany) 1. FC Kaiserslautern, previously on loan at (England) Preston North End)
—	DF	CIV	Abakar Sylla (to (Turkey) Gaziantep, previously on loan at Nantes)
—	MF	SEN	Pape Diong (to (Belgium) Westerlo, previously on loan at Dunkerque)
—	MF	FRA	Rabby Nzingoula (to (England) West Bromwich Albion, previously on loan at (Germany) 1. FC Nürnberg)
—	FW	COL	Óscar Perea (to (Mexico) Club América, previously on loan at (Portugal) AVS)

=== Toulouse ===
In:

No.	Pos.	Nation	Player
8	MF	DEN	Thomas Jørgensen (from (Denmark) Viborg)
11	FW	SWE	Sion Oppong (from (Sweden) Brommapojkarna)
12	DF	CIV	Christ Tapé (from (Denmark) Horsens)
14	MF	CAN	Niko Sigur (from (Croatia) Hajduk Split)
18	MF	FRA	Mathis Amougou (on loan from Strasbourg)
19	DF	GER	David Odogu (on loan from (Italy) Milan)
20	FW	DEN	Casper Tengstedt (from (Netherlands) Feyenoord)
94	DF	FRA	Ismaïl Diallo (from Dijon)

Out:

No.	Pos.	Nation	Player
4	DF	ENG	Charlie Cresswell (on loan to Rennes)
9	FW	CMR	Frank Magri (to (Qatar) Al-Gharafa)
10	MF	CIV	Yann Gboho (to (England) Coventry City)
12	DF	NOR	Warren Kamanzi (to (Sweden) Malmö)
16	GK	NOR	Kjetil Haug (to (Netherlands) Go Ahead Eagles)
18	MF	SEN	Pape Demba Diop (loan return to Strasbourg)
19	DF	FRA	Djibril Sidibé (to Le Mans)
20	FW	BRA	Emersonn (to (England) Ipswich Town)
21	FW	FRA	Enzo Faty (on loan to (Belgium) Francs Borains)
24	DF	FRA	Dayann Methalie (to (England) Sunderland)
30	GK	ESP	Álex Domínguez (to (Spain) Ponferradina)
77	MF	SVK	Mário Sauer (on loan to (Germany) 1. FC Kaiserslautern)
—	DF	FRA	Aymen Sadi (on loan to Aubagne Air Bel)
—	DF	FRA	Ylies Aradj (on loan to Aubagne Air Bel, previously on loan at Laval)
—	MF	FRA	Mathis Saka (reloan to Rodez)
—	MF	ALG	Edhy Zuliani (to (Netherlands) VVV-Venlo, previously on loan at Pau)
—	FW	GUI	Ibrahim Cissoko (to (Netherlands) PEC Zwolle, previously on loan at (England) Bolton Wanderers)

=== Lorient ===
In:

No.	Pos.	Nation	Player
2	DF	FRA	Alec Georgen (from Dunkerque)
10	FW	DEN	Isak Jensen (on loan from (Netherlands) AZ)
18	FW	FRA	Ibrahima Baldé (on loan from Rodez)
19	FW	SEN	Souleymane Faye (on loan from (Portugal) Sporting CP)
30	DF	SLO	Srđan Kuzmić (from (Denmark) Viborg)
33	MF	FRA	Gabin Bernardeau (from Nice)
55	DF	ITA	Nosa Edward Obaretin (on loan from (Italy) Napoli, previously on loan at (Italy) Empoli)
72	MF	COD	Noah Mbamba (on loan from (Germany) Bayer Leverkusen, previously on loan at (Belgium) Dender)

Out:

No.	Pos.	Nation	Player
2	DF	BRA	Igor Silva (free agent)
5	DF	CIV	Bamo Meïté (loan return to Marseille)
6	MF	FRA	Laurent Abergel (to Nice)
10	MF	FRA	Pablo Pagis (to Paris FC)
12	FW	SEN	Bamba Dieng (to (Serbia) Red Star Belgrade)
14	FW	ENG	Trevan Sanusi (loan return to (England) Newcastle United)
19	DF	FRA	Isaac Monnier (on loan to Bastia)
25	DF	SEN	Abdoulaye Faye (loan return to (Germany) Bayer Leverkusen)
28	FW	SEN	Sambou Soumano (to Reims)
29	MF	TOG	Dermane Karim (loan return to (Belgium) Lommel)
44	DF	CMR	Darlin Yongwa (to (England) Norwich City)
—	DF	FRA	Enzo Genton (on loan to Amiens, previously on loan at FC Rouen)
—	FW	FRA	Jérémy Hatchi (on loan to Montpellier, previously on loan at Guingamp)
—	FW	NOR	Joel Mvuka (to (Norway) Bodø/Glimt, previously on loan at (Scotland) Celtic)

=== Paris FC ===
In:

No.	Pos.	Nation	Player
3	DF	FRA	Emmanuel Mbemba (from Paris Saint-Germain youth)
7	MF	FRA	Pablo Pagis (from Lorient)
8	MF	CIV	Patrick Zabi (from Reims)
9	FW	MLI	Lassine Sinayoko (from Auxerre)
15	FW	ITA	Luca Koleosho (from (England) Burnley, previously on loan)
42	DF	ITA	Diego Coppola (from (England) Brighton & Hove Albion, previously on loan)

Out:

No.	Pos.	Nation	Player
1	GK	FRA	Rémy Riou (free agent)
2	DF	FIN	Tuomas Ollila (to Guingamp)
7	FW	FRA	Alimami Gory (to (Saudi Arabia) Abha)
9	FW	FRA	Willem Geubbels (to (Italy) Lecce)
13	MF	FRA	Mathieu Cafaro (to Nantes)
15	DF	FRA	Timothée Kolodziejczak (free agent)
18	MF	ZIM	Marshall Munetsi (loan return to (England) Wolverhampton Wanderers)
20	MF	ALG	Julien López (to Cannes)
22	DF	MAR	Sofiane Alakouch (free agent)
26	FW	SEN	Lamine Gueye (free agent)
29	FW	FRA	Pierre-Yves Hamel (free agent)
36	FW	ITA	Ciro Immobile (retired)
—	FW	MAD	Ylan El Hadary (on loan to Nancy, previously on loan at Valenciennes)
—	DF	MAR	Mathys Tourraine (to Pau, previously on loan at Clermont)
—	MF	CAF	Gabriel Oualengbe (free agent, previously on loan at Toulon)
—	MF	BFA	Lohann Doucet (to (Portugal) Vitória Guimarães, previously on loan at Dunkerque)

=== Brest ===
In:

No.	Pos.	Nation	Player
1	GK	NOR	Egil Selvik (on loan from (England) Watford)
4	DF	FRA	Gautier Lloris (from Le Havre)
6	MF	MLI	Mamady Diambou (from (Austria) Red Bull Salzburg)
7	MF	BEL	Joseph Nonge (from (Turkey) Kocaelispor)
10	FW	FRA	Giovani Versini (from Pau)
11	FW	FRA	Noah Edjouma (on loan from Lille)
16	GK	FRA	Noé Poillion (from Metz youth)
30	GK	FRA	Mathieu Patouillet (from (Saudi Arabia) Al-Hilal)
39	FW	FRA	Djylian N'Guessan (on loan from Saint-Étienne)
49	GK	FRA	Romain Cagnon (free agent)

Out:

No.	Pos.	Nation	Player
1	GK	POL	Radosław Majecki (loan return to Monaco)
4	DF	CIV	Junior Diaz (loan return to Troyes)
7	MF	CMR	Junior Dina Ebimbe (loan return to (Germany) Eintracht Frankfurt)
10	FW	FRA	Romain Del Castillo (to (Spain) Osasuna)
14	FW	GLP	Rémy Labeau Lascary (loan return to Lens)
27	DF	MLI	Daouda Guindo (to Reims)
29	FW	SEN	Saliou Diop (to (Denmark) AB)
30	GK	FRA	Grégoire Coudert (to (England) Burnley)
33	MF	MLI	Hamidou Makalou (on loan to Bastia)
44	DF	FRA	Soumaïla Coulibaly (loan return to Strasbourg)
50	GK	IRL	Noah Jauny (to (Belgium) Francs Borains)
—	FW	FRA	Axel Camblan (to (Portugal) Estoril, previously on loan at Clermont)

=== Angers ===
In:

No.	Pos.	Nation	Player
1	GK	POR	Anthony Lopes (from Nantes)
7	FW	CAF	Usman Simbakoli (from (Belgium) RWDM Brussels)
8	MF	NED	Branco van den Boomen (from (Netherlands) Ajax, previously on loan)
17	DF	FRA	Joseph Kalulu (from Pau)
19	FW	MAR	Amine El Ouazzani (on loan from (Portugal) Braga)
26	MF	FRA	Anthony Bermont (on loan from Lens)

Out:

No.	Pos.	Nation	Player
3	DF	GAB	Jacques Ekomié (to (Wales) Wrexham)
5	MF	FRA	Marius Courcoul (on loan to (Belgium) La Louvière)
9	FW	CAF	Goduine Koyalipou (loan return to Lens)
12	GK	BFA	Hervé Koffi (loan return to Lens)
15	MF	FRA	Pierrick Capelle (retired)
23	DF	MLI	Dan Sinaté (on loan to Amiens)
25	DF	CIV	Abdoulaye Bamba (retired)
26	DF	FRA	Florent Hanin (to (Cyprus) Nea Salamis Famagusta)
36	FW	FRA	Lanroy Machine (on loan to (Netherlands) Heerenveen)
—	DF	ALG	Yacine Gaya (to Quevilly-Rouen, previously on loan)
—	FW	GUI	Sidiki Cherif (to (Turkey) Fenerbahçe, previously on loan)

=== Le Havre ===
In:

No.	Pos.	Nation	Player
5	DF	ALG	Ahmed Touba (on loan from (Greece) Panathinaikos)
6	MF	FRA	Junior Mwanga (from Strasbourg)
7	MF	MAR	Amir Richardson (on loan from (Italy) Fiorentina, previously on loan at (Denmark) Copenhagen)
9	FW	NGR	Josh Maja (from (England) West Bromwich Albion)
12	DF	DEN	Elias Jelert (on loan from (Turkey) Galatasaray, previously on loan at (England) Southampton)
16	GK	BEL	Arnaud Bodart (from Lille)
17	MF	JPN	Kaito Mizuta (from (Germany) Rot-Weiss Essen)
19	FW	FRA	Joan Tincres (from Monaco youth)
23	DF	FRA	Vincent Sasso (from Dunkerque)
30	FW	JPN	Sōta Nakamura (on loan from (Japan) Sanfrecce Hiroshima)
32	DF	FRA	Timothée Pembélé (from (England) Sunderland, previously on loan)
38	FW	FRA	Rayan Fofana (on loan from Lens)
93	GK	FRA	Gauthier Gallon (from (Belgium) Dender)
97	DF	SEN	Lamine N'Diaye (from (Portugal) Alverca B, previously on loan at (Portugal) Covilhã)

Out:

No.	Pos.	Nation	Player
4	DF	FRA	Gautier Lloris (to Brest)
6	DF	FRA	Étienne Youté Kinkoué (to (Switzerland) Lausanne-Sport)
7	DF	HUN	Loïc Négo (to (Cyprus) Omonia)
8	MF	MAR	Yassine Kechta (to (Spain) Leganés)
11	FW	FRA	Godson Kyeremeh (to Red Star)
13	DF	MLI	Fodé Doucouré (to Nantes)
17	FW	MAR	Sofiane Boufal (to (Libya) Al-Ittihad)
18	DF	FRA	Yanis Zouaoui (to Montpellier)
19	MF	FRA	Lucas Gourna-Douath (loan return to (Austria) Red Bull Salzburg)
20	FW	FRA	Noam Obougou (on loan to Nancy)
30	MF	GER	Reda Khadra (loan return to Reims)
33	FW	HAI	Kenny Quetant (to (Germany) Werder Bremen)
45	FW	SEN	Issa Soumaré (to Rennes)
50	GK	FRA	Paul Argney (on loan to Dinan Léhon)
93	DF	SEN	Arouna Sangante (to (Spain) Sevilla)
94	MF	GUI	Abdoulaye Touré (free agent)
99	GK	SEN	Mory Diaw (to (Saudi Arabia) Al-Shabab)
—	MF	FRA	Mokrane Bentoumi (to (Netherlands) Roda JC, previously on loan at Aubagne Air Bel)

=== Auxerre ===
In:

No.	Pos.	Nation	Player
1	GK	FRA	Paul Nardi (from (England) Queens Park Rangers)
3	FW	GLP	Rémy Labeau Lascary (on loan from Lens, previously on loan at Brest)
4	DF	COD	Axel Tuanzebe (from (England) Burnley)
9	FW	ENG	Cameron Archer (on loan from (England) Southampton)
15	DF	CGO	Christ Makosso (from (England) Luton Town, previously on loan at (England) Oxford United)
17	MF	FRA	Pierre Ekwah (on loan from Saint-Étienne, previously on loan at (England) Watford)
19	FW	CMR	Danny Namaso (from (Portugal) Porto, previously on loan)
23	GK	MTN	Mamadou Diop (from Grenoble)
46	MF	BEL	Arthur Piedfort (from (Belgium) Westerlo)
49	FW	CHN	Wei Xiangxin (from (China) Meizhou Hakka)
93	DF	CIV	Sékou Fofana (from (Switzerland) Lausanne-Sport)
—	DF	FRA	Ackah-Tidiane Zoukrou (from Monaco youth)

Out:

No.	Pos.	Nation	Player
4	DF	CHI	Francisco Sierralta (on loan to (Poland) Piast Gliwice)
7	FW	HAI	Josué Casimir (on loan to (Russia) Dynamo Moscow)
9	FW	FRA	Sékou Mara (loan return to Strasbourg)
10	FW	MLI	Lassine Sinayoko (to Paris FC)
14	DF	GHA	Gideon Mensah (to (Germany) 1. FC Köln)
16	GK	GUF	Donovan Léon (to (Saudi Arabia) Abha)
17	MF	MAR	Oussama El Azzouzi (loan return to (Italy) Bologna)
21	FW	CIV	Lasso Coulibaly (on loan to (Denmark) Viborg)
30	GK	FRA	Tom Negrel (free agent)
40	GK	FRA	Théo De Percin (on loan to Bastia)
42	MF	GHA	Elisha Owusu (to (Turkey) Erzurumspor)
—	MF	FRA	Nathan Buayi-Kiala (free agent)
—	FW	CAN	Theo Bair (on loan to (England) Bolton Wanderers, previously on loan at (Switzerland) Lausanne-Sport)
—	DF	FRA	Paul Joly (to (Germany) 1. FC Kaiserslautern, previously on loan)
—	DF	MAR	Saad Agouzoul (to Sochaux, previously on loan at (Cyprus) Omonia)
—	FW	NED	Eros Maddy (free agent, previously on loan at Laval)

=== Nice ===
In:

No.	Pos.	Nation	Player
7	FW	FRA	Gauthier Hein (from Metz)
9	FW	ALG	Mohamed Amoura (on loan from (Germany) VfL Wolfsburg)
11	FW	CIV	Elye Wahi (reloan from (Germany) Eintracht Frankfurt)
19	MF	FRA	Laurent Abergel (from Lorient)
27	DF	FRA	Niels Nkounkou (on loan from (Germany) Eintracht Frankfurt, previously on loan at (Italy) Torino)
28	MF	BEL	Axel Witsel (from (Spain) Girona)
29	FW	CMR	Nathan Ngoumou (from (Germany) Borussia Mönchengladbach)
36	DF	GHA	Alidu Seidu (on loan from Rennes)

Out:

No.	Pos.	Nation	Player
4	DF	BRA	Dante (retired)
20	MF	FRA	Tom Louchet (to (Greece) PAOK)
22	MF	FRA	Tanguy Ndombele (free agent)
23	MF	FRA	Gabin Bernardeau (to Lorient)
24	MF	BEL	Charles Vanhoutte (to (Netherlands) Feyenoord)
25	FW	FRA	Mohamed-Ali Cho (to (England) Hull City)
26	DF	FRA	Melvin Bard (on loan to (England) Leeds United)
28	DF	SLE	Juma Bah (loan return to (England) Manchester City)
30	GK	POL	Bartosz Żelazowski (free agent)
31	GK	FRA	Maxime Dupé (to Nantes)
32	FW	ALG	Kaïl Boudache (to Lyon)
36	DF	CGO	Brad Mantsounga (on loan to (Belgium) Virton)
37	DF	GHA	Kojo Peprah Oppong (to (Turkey) Fenerbahçe)
47	FW	POR	Tiago Gouveia (loan return to (Portugal) Benfica)
90	FW	ESP	Kevin Carlos (on loan to (Italy) Cagliari)
—	FW	NGR	Victor Orakpo (on loan to (Turkey) Gençlerbirliği, previously on loan at Nancy)
—	DF	ITA	Mattia Viti (to (Italy) Sampdoria, previously on loan)
—	MF	ROU	Rareș Ilie (to (Italy) Mantova, previously on loan at (Italy) Empoli)
—	FW	GUI	Aliou Baldé (to (Switzerland) St. Gallen, previously on loan)
—	FW	CIV	Jérémie Boga (to (Italy) Juventus, previously on loan)
—	FW	NGR	Terem Moffi (to (Germany) Hamburger SV, previously on loan at (Portugal) Porto)

=== Troyes ===
In:

No.	Pos.	Nation	Player
9	FW	FRA	Jérémy Le Douaron (on loan from (Italy) Palermo)
11	MF	FRA	Iron Gomis (from (Azerbaijan) Zira)
22	MF	FRA	Hugo Picard (on loan from (United States) Columbus Crew)
23	FW	FRA	Timothé Nkada (on loan from (Belgium) Standard Liège)
29	MF	TOG	Dermane Karim (from (Belgium) Lommel, previously on loan at Lorient)
33	GK	AUS	Patrick Beach (from (Australia) Melbourne City)

Out:

No.	Pos.	Nation	Player
5	MF	FRA	Martin Adeline (to (Germany) Hamburger SV)
7	MF	FRA	Xavier Chavalerin (free agent)
9	FW	FRA	Mounaïm El Idrissy (to (Morocco) Raja Casablanca)
11	FW	FRA	Mathys Detourbet (to (England) Manchester City)
12	FW	NGR	Elijah Odede (on loan to (Belgium) Lommel)
16	GK	FRA	Nicolas Lemaître (to Rennes)
18	DF	FRA	Thierno Baldé (to Nancy)
21	FW	MAR	Tawfik Bentayeb (loan return to (Morocco) Union Touarga)
23	DF	CAF	Hugo Gambor (loan return to (Belgium) Gent)
33	DF	FRA	Fred Ondoa (on loan to Villefranche)
37	DF	FRA	Tom Akpakoun (free agent)
38	DF	FRA	Sankhoun Diawara (to (Italy) Milan)
—	DF	ALG	Yasser Larouci (to Le Mans, previously on loan at (Greece) Kifisia)
—	FW	SWE	Amar Fatah (to (Italy) Lecce, previously on loan at (Scotland) Dundee United)

=== Le Mans ===
In:

No.	Pos.	Nation	Player
7	FW	ALG	Billal Brahimi (from (Brazil) Santos, previously on loan at (Portugal) Estrela da Amadora)
12	DF	BRA	João Almeida (on loan from (Brazil) Coritiba)
13	FW	SEN	Habib Diallo (from Metz)
14	FW	CAF	Louis Mafouta (from Guingamp)
16	DF	ESP	Raúl Torrente (on loan from (Croatia) Dinamo Zagreb)
19	DF	FRA	Djibril Sidibé (from Toulouse)
23	MF	FRA	Daouda Traoré (on loan from (England) Southampton, previously on loan at (Italy) Bari)
26	DF	FRA	Rayan Bamba (on loan from Rennes, previously on loan at Nancy)
76	DF	ALG	Yasser Larouci (from Troyes, previously on loan at (Greece) Kifisia)
99	FW	BRA	Enzo Vagner (on loan from (Brazil) Coritiba)

Out:

No.	Pos.	Nation	Player
3	DF	FRA	Isaac Cossier (loan return to Lille)
7	MF	FRA	Malang Gomes (loan return to Nantes)
12	DF	FRA	Anthony Ribelin (to Amiens)
19	FW	BEL	Baptiste Guillaume (free agent)
23	FW	FRA	Taylor Luvambo (to (Romania) Argeș Pitești)
24	MF	FRA	Milan Robin (to (Portugal) Estoril)
26	DF	FRA	Mathis Hamdi (to Quevilly-Rouen)
32	MF	FRA	Izhak Hammoudi (on loan to Bourges)
—	DF	FRA	Nathan Tronchet (on loan to Haguenau, previously on loan at Blois)

== Ligue 2 ==
Note: Flags indicate national team as has been defined under FIFA eligibility rules. Players may hold more than one non-FIFA nationality.

=== Nantes ===
In:

No.	Pos.	Nation	Player
1	GK	FRA	Maxime Dupé (from Nice)
4	DF	GUI	Saïdou Sow (on loan from Strasbourg, previously on loan at Clermont)
5	DF	FRA	Lucas Perrin (from (Spain) Sporting Gijón)
7	FW	FRA	Antoine Joujou (from (Italy) Parma, previously on loan at (Portugal) Famalicão)
12	FW	FRA	Killian Corredor (from (Germany) Darmstadt 98)
13	DF	MLI	Fodé Doucouré (from Le Havre)
20	MF	FRA	Mathieu Cafaro (from Paris FC)
23	MF	CMR	Wilitty Younoussa (from Rodez)
26	MF	FRA	Ryad Hachem (from Red Star)
27	FW	FRA	Thomas Robinet (from Dunkerque)
30	GK	SWE	Patrik Carlgren (free agent)
44	MF	FRA	Balthazar Pierret (from Red Star)
75	DF	TUN	Amin Cherni (on loan from (Turkey) Göztepe)

Out:

No.	Pos.	Nation	Player
1	GK	POR	Anthony Lopes (to Angers)
2	DF	LBA	Ali Youssef (to (Libya) Al-Ittihad)
3	DF	FRA	Nicolas Cozza (loan return to (Germany) VfL Wolfsburg)
4	DF	CIV	Abakar Sylla (loan return to Strasbourg)
6	DF	NGR	Chidozie Awaziem (to (Turkey) Konyaspor)
10	FW	FRA	Matthis Abline (to Monaco)
11	FW	FRA	Herba Guirassy (to (Switzerland) Young Boys)
13	MF	FRA	Francis Coquelin (to Laval)
14	FW	MLI	Amady Camara (loan return to (Austria) Sturm Graz)
19	FW	MAR	Youssef El-Arabi (to (Greece) Marko)
20	MF	FRA	Rémy Cabella (loan return to (Greece) Olympiacos)
21	MF	GUI	Mohamed Kaba (loan return to (Italy) Lecce)
22	DF	MAD	Mathieu Acapandié (to (Croatia) Hajduk Split)
26	DF	SRB	Uroš Radaković (to (Thailand) Buriram United)
27	DF	COL	Deiver Machado (to (Russia) Rodina Moscow)
30	GK	SWE	Patrik Carlgren (free agent)
31	FW	EGY	Mostafa Mohamed (to (Turkey) Konyaspor)
52	MF	MTN	Bahmed Deuff (on loan to (Belgium) Antwerp)
65	DF	FRA	Hugo Lamy (on loan to La Roche-sur-Yon)
—	GK	CIV	Alban Lafont (to (Turkey) Amedspor, previously on loan at (Greece) Panathinaikos)
—	DF	HAI	Jean-Kévin Duverne (to (Cyprus) Omonia, previously on loan at (Belgium) Gent)
—	FW	FRA	Yassine Benhattab (to Montpellier, previously on loan at Reims)

=== Metz ===
In:

No.	Pos.	Nation	Player
3	DF	FRA	Florian Miguel (from (Spain) Burgos)
5	DF	FRA	Jean Ruiz (from Pau)
6	MF	SEN	Nampalys Mendy (from (England) Watford)
10	MF	FRA	Téji Savanier (from Montpellier)
27	MF	SEN	Alassane Sy (from (Senegal) Génération Foot)
33	FW	SEN	Abdourahmane Mbodji (from (Senegal) Génération Foot)
42	DF	COL	Cristian Devenish (from (Portugal) AVS)
98	DF	COM	Idris Mohamed (from Le Puy)

Out:

No.	Pos.	Nation	Player
5	DF	CIV	Jean-Philippe Gbamin (to (Bulgaria) CSKA Sofia)
7	FW	GEO	Giorgi Tsitaishvili (loan return to (Ukraine) Dynamo Kyiv)
8	MF	MLI	Boubacar Traoré (loan return to (England) Wolverhampton Wanderers)
10	FW	FRA	Gauthier Hein (to Nice)
11	FW	GEO	Giorgi Kvilitaia (to (Germany) Holstein Kiel)
15	DF	GHA	Terry Yegbe (to (Poland) Lech Poznań)
19	FW	FRA	Lucas Michal (loan return to Monaco)
21	MF	FRA	Benjamin Stambouli (free agent)
25	DF	FRA	Cléo Mélières (on loan to Bastia)
27	DF	TOG	Yannis Lawson (on loan to (Belgium) Seraing)
29	MF	MAR	Ismaël Guerti (to (Austria) Grazer AK)
30	FW	SEN	Habib Diallo (to Le Mans)
38	DF	SEN	Sadibou Sané (to Monaco)
39	DF	CIV	Koffi Kouao (to (Uzbekistan) Neftchi Fergana)
97	DF	SEN	Fodé Ballo-Touré (free agent)
—	FW	FRA	Édouard Soumah-Abbad (on loan to Paris 13 Atletico, previously on loan at (Belgium) Seraing)
—	DF	ALG	Kevin Van Den Kerkhof (to (Belgium) Charleroi, previously on loan)
—	MF	ANG	Joseph Nduquidi (to (Portugal) Farense, previously on loan at Amiens)
—	FW	SEN	Idrissa Gueye (to (Italy) Udinese, previously on loan)
—	FW	SWE	Joel Asoro (to (Cyprus) Apollon Limassol, previously on loan at (Sweden) Djurgården)

=== Saint-Étienne ===
In:

No.	Pos.	Nation	Player
1	GK	SEN	Mamour Ndiaye (from (Norway) Sarpsborg 08)
8	FW	AUT	Thierno Ballo (from (Austria) Wolfsberger, previously on loan at (England) Millwall)
10	MF	DEN	Jakob Breum (from (Netherlands) Go Ahead Eagles)
14	MF	HUN	Áron Csongvai (from (Sweden) AIK)
16	MF	SLO	Tamar Svetlin (from (Poland) Korona Kielce)
18	DF	ALG	Sohaib Naïr (from Guingamp)
40	GK	FRA	Lucas Lavallée (from Châteauroux)

Out:

No.	Pos.	Nation	Player
1	GK	FRA	Brice Maubleu (to Pau)
2	DF	SRB	Strahinja Stojković (on loan to (Serbia) OFK Beograd)
3	DF	FRA	Mickaël Nadé (to (United Arab Emirates) Dubai United)
8	DF	FRA	Dennis Appiah (to Caen)
10	MF	FRA	Florian Tardieu (to Montpellier)
14	MF	CIV	Abdoulaye Kanté (loan return to (England) Middlesbrough)
18	DF	FRA	Aboubaka Soumahoro (loan return to (Germany) Hamburger SV)
19	DF	GHA	Ebenezer Annan (on loan to (Romania) Rapid București)
25	FW	FRA	Djylian N'Guessan (on loan to Brest)
28	MF	SRB	Igor Miladinović (on loan to (Serbia) Partizan)
29	MF	MAR	Aïmen Moueffek (on loan to (Spain) Cádiz)
32	FW	BEL	Lucas Stassin (on loan to (Spain) Sevilla)
33	DF	FRA	Axel Dodote (on loan to Pau)
35	MF	FRA	Luan Gadegbeku (on loan to Pau)
—	MF	FRA	Jebryl Sahraoui (on loan to Aubagne Air Bel)
—	FW	GUI	Karim Cissé (to Aubagne Air Bel)
—	MF	FRA	Pierre Ekwah (on loan to Auxerre, previously on loan at (England) Watford)
—	DF	FRA	Beres Owusu (to (Austria) Grazer AK, previously on loan)
—	FW	FRA	Enzo Mayilla (to Dunkerque, previously on loan at Aubagne Air Bel)

=== Red Star ===
In:

No.	Pos.	Nation	Player
1	GK	MAR	Yanis Benchaouch (from Monaco youth)
4	DF	FRA	Elyaz Zidane (from (Spain) Betis Deportivo)
9	FW	SUI	Ilija Despotović (from (Switzerland) Lausanne-Sport)
14	MF	FRA	Mahamadou Diawara (on loan from Lyon, previously on loan at (Belgium) Antwerp)
21	MF	FRA	Idrissa Sabaly (on loan from Strasbourg)
25	DF	POR	Leonardo Buta (from (Italy) Udinese, previously on loan at (Portugal) Rio Ave)
27	FW	FRA	Godson Kyeremeh (from Le Havre)
80	DF	FRA	Côme Bianay Balcot (on loan from (Italy) Torino, previously on loan at (Italy) Mantova)

Out:

No.	Pos.	Nation	Player
1	GK	FRA	Quentin Beunardeau (to Cannes)
4	MF	FRA	Balthazar Pierret (to Nantes)
6	DF	GUI	Rayane Doucouré (to Aubagne Air Bel)
9	FW	SEN	Pape Meïssa Ba (loan return to (Poland) Widzew Łódź)
12	MF	FRA	Vincent Kany (free agent)
21	FW	FRA	Abdelsamad Hachem (on loan to (Belgium) Virton)
22	DF	GUI	Dembo Sylla (loan return to Lorient)
29	FW	ALG	Hacène Benali (to Pau)
81	MF	FRA	Giovanni Haag (loan return to (Germany) Fortuna Düsseldorf)
98	MF	FRA	Ryad Hachem (to Nantes)

=== Rodez ===
In:

No.	Pos.	Nation	Player
5	DF	FRA	Mohamed Sylla (from Bourg-Péronnas)
8	MF	SRB	Damjan Pavlović (from (Lithuania) Kauno Žalgiris)
9	FW	BEL	Nachon Nsingi (from (Belgium) La Louvière)
10	MF	FRA	Mathis Saka (reloan from Toulouse)
11	FW	FRA	Mathis Touho (from Villefranche)
21	FW	FRA	Kélian Nsona (from (Portugal) Casa Pia)
27	FW	FRA	Marco Essimi (from (Portugal) Alverca)
28	DF	FRA	Steven Luyambula (from Orléans)
29	MF	FRA	Antonin Cartillier (from Rouen)

Out:

No.	Pos.	Nation	Player
5	DF	FRA	Clément Jolibois (to (Greece) Kifisia)
7	MF	FRA	Mohamed Achi (to (Bulgaria) Cherno More)
8	MF	CMR	Wilitty Younoussa (to Nantes)
10	FW	ALG	Mehdi Baaloudj (free agent)
11	FW	GLP	Taïryk Arconte (to (England) Millwall)
12	MF	FRA	Morgan Corredor (to Tarbes Pyrénées)
18	FW	FRA	Ibrahima Baldé (on loan to Lorient)
25	DF	FRA	Nolan Galves (to (England) West Bromwich Albion)
26	MF	FRA	Samy Benchamma (to (Algeria) JS Kabylie)
27	MF	FRA	Alexis Trouillet (to (Belgium) Standard Liège)
—	DF	FRA	Aurélien Pelon (to Grenoble, previously on loan at Saint-Pryvé)

=== Reims ===
In:

No.	Pos.	Nation	Player
1	GK	GER	Tom Ritzy Hülsmann (from (Austria) TSV Hartberg)
5	MF	NGR	John Otomewo (from (Israel) Hapoel Jerusalem)
10	FW	MAR	Youssef El Kachati (from (Netherlands) NEC)
12	GK	SUI	Edin Omeragić (from (Switzerland) Neuchâtel Xamax)
16	GK	FRA	Alexis Sauvage (from Amiens)
22	DF	CMR	Samuel Kotto (from (Belgium) Gent, previously on loan)
27	DF	MLI	Daouda Guindo (from Brest)
46	MF	MLI	Seydou Dembélé (from (Mali) JMG Academy)
61	MF	MAR	Chamsedin Kouranfal (from Pagny)
63	DF	CIV	Armel Zohouri (from (Georgia (country)) Iberia 1999)
77	FW	FRA	Quentin Paris (from Annecy)
99	FW	SEN	Sambou Soumano (from Lorient)

Out:

No.	Pos.	Nation	Player
3	DF	JPN	Hiroki Sekine (on loan to (Germany) Holstein Kiel)
4	DF	BEL	Maxime Busi (to (Belgium) Antwerp)
5	DF	FRA	Nicolas Pallois (free agent)
7	FW	MLI	Thiemoko Diarra (to (Turkey) Kasımpaşa)
17	FW	JPN	Keito Nakamura (to Lyon)
20	GK	FRA	Alexandre Olliero (to Grenoble)
27	FW	GAM	Adama Bojang (on loan to (Belgium) Charleroi)
29	GK	FRA	Ewen Jaouen (to (England) Newcastle United)
86	MF	CIV	Patrick Zabi (to Paris FC)
90	FW	FRA	Yassine Benhattab (loan return to Nantes)
92	DF	FRA	Abdoul Koné (loan return to (Germany) RB Leipzig)
94	GK	GUI	Soumaïla Sylla (on loan to Nîmes)
—	DF	SWE	Malcolm Jeng (on loan to (Netherlands) Groningen, previously on loan at (Netherlands) Feyenoord)
—	FW	MLI	Niama Pape Sissoko (on loan to (Austria) SV Ried, previously on loan at Nancy)
—	FW	CIV	Oumar Diakité (on loan to (Austria) Sturm Graz, previously on loan at (Belgium) Cercle Brugge)
—	DF	CIV	Cédric Kipré (to (England) Ipswich Town, previously on loan)
—	MF	GER	Reda Khadra (to (Azerbaijan) Qarabağ, previously on loan at Le Havre)
—	MF	FRA	Yohan Demoncy (to Sochaux, previously on loan at Guingamp)
—	FW	USA	Jordan Pefok (to (Germany) Greuther Fürth, previously on loan at (Portugal) Tondela)
—	FW	FRA	Antoine Leautey (to (China) Wuhan Three Towns, previously on loan at Amiens)

=== Annecy ===
In:

No.	Pos.	Nation	Player
4	DF	FRA	Sacha Lima (from UF Touraine)
7	FW	FRA	Alan Mondesir (from Montlouis)
8	MF	FRA	Alexis Casadei (from (Switzerland) Basel, previously on loan)
11	MF	CIV	Souleymane Fofana (from (Ivory Coast) ASEC Mimosas)
12	FW	ENG	Kadan Young (on loan from (England) Aston Villa, previously on loan at (England) Reading)
14	MF	CIV	Mohamed Koné (from (England) Aston Villa)
15	MF	POL	Pascal Mozie (from (Poland) Legia Warsaw)
17	FW	NED	Zépiqueno Redmond (on loan from (England) Aston Villa, previously on loan at (England) Huddersfield Town)
21	DF	FRA	Esteban Marre (from Istres)
26	DF	GAB	Jonathan Do Marcolino (from Rennes, previously on loan at Bourg-Péronnas)
32	DF	GHA	David Oduro (from (Spain) Barcelona B)

Out:

No.	Pos.	Nation	Player
2	DF	ENG	Triston Rowe (loan return to (England) Aston Villa)
3	DF	MAR	Hamza Koutoune (loan return to Nice)
7	MF	FRA	Valentin Jacob (to Rumilly-Vallières)
8	MF	FRA	Abdel Hbouch (to Boulogne)
11	FW	ENG	Alejandro Gomes Rodríguez (loan return to Lyon)
17	MF	FRA	Vincent Pajot (retired)
18	DF	FRA	Axel Drouhin (to (Belgium) Kortrijk)
20	DF	ENG	Travis Patterson (loan return to (England) Aston Villa)
21	DF	COD	Fabrice Nsakala (free agent)
24	MF	FRA	Nolan Ferro (to (Serbia) Javor Matis)
26	DF	FRA	Cédric Makutungu (on loan to Cannes)
33	FW	FRA	Quentin Paris (to Reims)
40	GK	FRA	Aymerick Nedelec (to Chambéry)
42	MF	TUN	Wael Debbiche (free agent)
71	FW	CIV	Ben Hamed Touré (to (England) Barnsley)
—	FW	SUI	Ranjan Neelakandan (on loan to (Liechtenstein) Vaduz, previously on loan at (Switzerland) Yverdon-Sport)

=== Montpellier ===
In:

No.	Pos.	Nation	Player
5	MF	FRA	Florian Tardieu (from Saint-Étienne)
10	FW	FRA	Yassine Benhattab (from Nantes, previously on loan at Reims)
11	FW	MLI	Mamadou Camara (from Laval)
12	DF	CMR	Oscar Etoundi (from (Cameroon) Academy Foot de Douala)
19	FW	FRA	Nordan Mukiele (on loan from Rennes)
23	FW	ALG	Daryll Benlahlou (on loan from Lyon)
27	DF	FRA	Daylam Meddah (from Pau)
28	DF	FRA	Yanis Zouaoui (from Le Havre)
39	FW	FRA	Jérémy Hatchi (on loan from Lorient, previously on loan at Guingamp)
58	DF	MLI	Alpha Sissoko (from Guingamp)
90	MF	FRA	Grégory Ayem (from Racing Club de France)

Out:

No.	Pos.	Nation	Player
6	DF	GLP	Christopher Jullien (to (Belgium) Dender)
7	FW	COD	Nathanaël Mbuku (loan return to (Germany) FC Augsburg)
8	FW	FRA	Yanis Issoufou (to (England) Millwall)
10	MF	MAR	Khalil Fayad (to (Croatia) Hajduk Split)
11	MF	FRA	Téji Savanier (to Metz)
14	FW	FRA	Enzo Molebe (loan return to Lyon)
19	FW	GBS	Alexandre Mendy (to (Saudi Arabia) Al-Faisaly)
20	FW	FRA	Enzo Molebe (loan return to Lyon)
21	DF	FRA	Lucas Mincarelli (to (Portugal) Estrela da Amadora)
28	MF	BEL	Ayanda Sishuba (loan return to Rennes)
29	DF	CMR	Enzo Tchato (to (Italy) Frosinone)
—	FW	UAE	Junior Ndiaye (on loan to Valenciennes, previously on loan at Quevilly-Rouen)
—	DF	MLI	Modibo Sagnan (to (Turkey) Çaykur Rizespor, previously on loan)

=== Pau ===
In:

No.	Pos.	Nation	Player
1	GK	FRA	Brice Maubleu (from Saint-Étienne)
4	DF	FRA	Axel Dodote (on loan from Saint-Étienne)
5	MF	FRA	Lorenzo Rajot (from Caen)
7	FW	ALG	Hacène Benali (from Red Star)
9	FW	FRA	Babacar Leye (from Villefranche)
11	FW	FRA	Alexis Lefebvre (from (Belgium) RFC Liège)
14	FW	GAB	Royce Openda (from Bordeaux)
16	GK	FRA	Maxime Adam (from Colmar)
17	MF	FRA	Bilal Brahimi (on loan from (Denmark) Viborg)
18	FW	MTQ	Jérémy Sebas (on loan from Bastia)
19	FW	FRA	Tom Saettel (from Haguenau)
21	MF	FRA	Jessy Benet (from Grenoble)
22	DF	CMR	Rony Mimb Baheng (from Marseille B)
25	MF	FRA	Quentin Daubin (from Valenciennes)
27	MF	FRA	Luan Gadegbeku (on loan from Saint-Étienne)
29	DF	FRA	Gaëtan Paquiez (from Grenoble)
39	DF	MAR	Mathys Tourraine (from Paris FC, previously on loan at Clermont)
56	FW	SEN	Abdoulaye Mbaye (from (Senegal) Génération Foot, previously on loan)
88	DF	CIV	Axel Bamba (free agent)
97	DF	COM	Akim Abdallah (from Guingamp)

Out:

No.	Pos.	Nation	Player
3	DF	FRA	Joseph Kalulu (to Angers)
4	DF	FRA	Setigui Karamoko (to (Romania) Sepsi OSK)
9	FW	FRA	Kyliane Dong (loan return to (Germany) FC Augsburg)
10	FW	FRA	Giovani Versini (to Brest)
14	MF	FRA	Antonin Bobichon (free agent)
17	FW	FRA	Omar Sissoko (loan return to Paris FC)
18	FW	MAR	Omar Sadik (loan return to (Spain) Espanyol)
19	DF	GUI	Ousmane Kanté (retired)
20	MF	FRA	Julien Anziani (to (Turkey) Manisa)
21	MF	FRA	Steeve Beusnard (to (Azerbaijan) Turan Tovuz)
22	GK	FRA	Noah Raveyre (to (Portugal) Alverca)
25	DF	FRA	Jean Ruiz (to Metz)
26	DF	FRA	Neil Glossoa (to (Czech Republic) Slavia Prague)
34	DF	FRA	Salif Lebouath (to Valenciennes)
84	MF	MAR	Rayan Touzghar (to (Belgium) Standard Liège)
87	MF	ALG	Edhy Zuliani (loan return to Toulouse)
97	DF	FRA	Daylam Meddah (to Montpellier)
—	MF	FRA	Tom Gomes (on loan to Bourg-Péronnas, previously on loan at Andrézieux)

=== Dunkerque ===
In:

No.	Pos.	Nation	Player
2	DF	FRA	Ousmane Touré (on loan from Lille)
6	MF	FRA	Jordan Morel (from Orléans)
7	FW	TUN	Khalil Ayari (on loan from Paris Saint-Germain)
9	FW	FRA	Gaëtan Robail (free agent)
10	MF	FRA	Adrien Lebeau (from (Germany) Hansa Rostock)
11	MF	RUS	Yegor Prutsev (from (Serbia) Red Star Belgrade, previously on loan at (Serbia) OFK Beograd)
15	MF	FRA	Steven Nzonzi (from (England) Stoke City)
16	GK	FRA	Maxence Prévot (from (Belgium) OH Leuven)
19	FW	FRA	Souleymane Keita (from Boulogne)
23	FW	CIV	Arthylio Nadé (from Troyes B)
24	DF	FRA	Lenny Vallier (from (Portugal) Nacional)
25	MF	CMR	Franck Atoen (on loan from (Turkey) Samsunspor)
30	DF	BRA	Abner (free agent)
73	GK	ESP	Moha Ramos (from (Spain) Marino)
94	FW	FRA	Enzo Mayilla (from Saint-Étienne, previously on loan at Aubagne Air Bel)
99	FW	SEN	M'Baye Niang (free agent)

Out:

No.	Pos.	Nation	Player
1	GK	ESP	Marcos Lavín (to (Portugal) Académico de Viseu)
2	DF	FRA	Alec Georgen (to Lorient)
6	MF	SEN	Pape Diong (loan return to Strasbourg)
7	MF	FRA	Eddy Sylvestre (to (Romania) Farul Constanța)
8	MF	MLI	Anto Sekongo (to (Turkey) Samsunspor)
9	FW	FRA	Thomas Robinet (to Nantes)
10	FW	FRA	Marco Essimi (to (Portugal) Alverca)
15	MF	BFA	Lohann Doucet (loan return to Paris FC)
16	MF	ESP	Íñigo Eguaras (to (Spain) Salamanca)
18	MF	SEN	Malick Diop (free agent)
19	FW	GAM	Abou Kanté (to Laval)
20	MF	FRA	Enzo Bardeli (to (Spain) Levante)
23	DF	FRA	Vincent Sasso (to Le Havre)
29	MF	FRA	Marco Decherf (to (Belgium) Mechelen)
30	DF	BRA	Abner (free agent)
57	FW	FRA	Zaid Seha (on loan to Aubagne Air Bel)
60	GK	FRA	Mathys Niflore (loan return to Toulouse)
69	FW	CMR	Morgan Bokele (loan return to Metz)
77	FW	CIV	Aristide Zossou (loan return to Auxerre)

=== Guingamp ===
In:

No.	Pos.	Nation	Player
5	DF	FIN	Tuomas Ollila (from Paris FC)
8	MF	FRA	Florent Sanchez (from Orléans)
11	FW	GAB	Teddy Averlant (from Amiens)
20	MF	FRA	Samir Ben Brahim (from Versailles)
22	FW	COD	Brandon Bokangu (from Nancy)
23	MF	FRA	Jasser Chamakh (from Saint-Priest)
24	DF	ANG	Jeovanni Dianganga (from (Belgium) Lokeren)
25	MF	FRA	Tom Ducrocq (from Bastia)
—	FW	TUN	Zayon Chtaï-Telamio (from Paris Saint-Germain youth)

Out:

No.	Pos.	Nation	Player
8	MF	MLI	Kalidou Sidibé (to (Russia) Akhmat Grozny)
9	FW	CAF	Louis Mafouta (to Le Mans)
11	FW	SEN	Amadou Sagna (to (Israel) Ironi Kiryat Shmona)
17	FW	FRA	Freddy Mbemba (loan return to (Belgium) Charleroi)
18	DF	ALG	Sohaib Naïr (to Saint-Étienne)
20	FW	FRA	Jérémy Hatchi (loan return to Lorient)
21	MF	FRA	Yohan Demoncy (loan return to Reims)
22	DF	MLI	Alpha Sissoko (to Montpellier)
29	DF	COM	Akim Abdallah (to Pau)
32	DF	MLI	Ibrahima Diakité (on loan to Aubagne Air Bel)
33	DF	MLI	Eden Gassama (on loan to La Roche-sur-Yon)
34	MF	FRA	Youssef Njoya (to Limonest)

=== Grenoble ===
In:

No.	Pos.	Nation	Player
1	GK	FRA	Alexandre Olliero (from Reims)
3	DF	NED	Farouq Limouri (from (Netherlands) FC Eindhoven)
6	MF	FRA	Yohann Magnin (from (Bulgaria) CSKA 1948)
14	MF	USA	Mael Corboz (from (Germany) Arminia Bielefeld)
17	FW	ITA	Leonardo Cerri (from (Italy) Juventus Next Gen)
21	DF	CIV	Owen Kouassi (on loan from (Italy) Lecce, previously on loan at Laval)
23	FW	NED	Dillon Hoogewerf (from (Netherlands) Vitesse)
25	GK	FRA	Théo Borne (from (Czech Republic) Dynamo České Budějovice)
34	FW	POR	Zé Leite (from (Portugal) Penafiel)
43	DF	FRA	Aurélien Pelon (from Rodez, previously on loan at Saint-Pryvé)
44	MF	FRA	Owen Martinez-Jullien (from Beauvais)
46	MF	FRA	Jules Mouton (from Saint-Étienne B)
47	FW	FRA	Kyliann Fofana (from Paris FC B)
48	DF	FRA	Sakhalou Niakaté (from Valenciennes)
92	FW	FRA	Jean-Guy Akpa Akpro (on loan from (Italy) Pro Vercelli)
97	DF	GLP	Yvann Maçon (from (Greece) AEL)

Out:

No.	Pos.	Nation	Player
1	GK	FRA	Maxime Pattier (to Saint-Malo)
4	DF	FRA	Stone Mambo (to (Armenia) Noah)
7	FW	GUI	Yadaly Diaby (to (Canada) Vancouver Whitecaps)
8	MF	FRA	Jessy Benet (to Pau)
11	FW	BFA	Mamady Bangré (to (Azerbaijan) Sumgayit)
13	GK	MTN	Mamadou Diop (to Auxerre)
17	DF	FRA	Shaquil Delos (to (Belgium) La Louvière)
20	FW	FRA	Evans Maurin (to (Portugal) Casa Pia)
21	DF	FRA	Allan Tchaptchet (to (Belgium) Virton)
24	DF	FRA	Loris Mouyokolo (to (Russia) Baltika)
26	DF	FRA	Mathieu Mion (to Boulogne)
29	DF	FRA	Gaëtan Paquiez (to Pau)
—	DF	TUR	Efe Sarıkaya (to (Turkey) Gaziantep, previously on loan at Çorum)
—	FW	FRA	Alan Kerouedan (to Cannes, previously on loan at Rouen)

=== Clermont ===
In:

No.	Pos.	Nation	Player
5	MF	FRA	Jean Grillot (from Bordeaux)
7	FW	FRA	Florian Bianchini (on loan from (Wales) Swansea City, previously on loan at (England) Portsmouth)
9	FW	POR	Luís Semedo (from (England) Sunderland, previously on loan at (Portugal) Moreirense)
10	MF	CAF	Junior Sambia (free agent)
26	MF	MLI	Rominigue Kouamé (from (Spain) Cádiz)
29	FW	FRA	Arthur Saintorens (from Aviron Bayonnais)
90	FW	FRA	Christ Okou (on loan from Paris FC B)

Out:

No.	Pos.	Nation	Player
4	DF	GUI	Saïdou Sow (loan return to Strasbourg)
5	DF	BEL	Maximiliano Caufriez (free agent)
7	FW	FRA	Axel Camblan (loan return to Brest)
8	MF	ALG	Yuliwes Bellache (to Andrézieux)
9	FW	ALG	Amine Saïd (to Rumilly-Vallières)
10	MF	SEN	Henri Saivet (free agent)
18	FW	SEN	Famara Diédhiou (to (Saudi Arabia) Al-Orobah)
19	FW	MLI	Mohamed Guindo (loan return to (Belgium) La Louvière)
25	MF	FRA	Johan Gastien (retired)
29	FW	TUR	İlhan Fakılı (to (Turkey) Beşiktaş)
32	FW	FRA	Kader Bamba (to (Spain) Granada)
39	DF	MAR	Mathys Tourraine (loan return to Paris FC)
—	DF	MLI	Cheick Oumar Konaté (to (Belgium) Beveren, previously on loan at (Greece) Kifisia)
—	MF	MLI	Habib Keïta (to (Turkey) Kocaelispor, previously on loan)

=== Nancy ===
In:

No.	Pos.	Nation	Player
2	DF	FRA	Héliohdino Tavares (from Guingamp B)
5	FW	SEN	Pape Meïssa Ba (from (Poland) Widzew Łódź, previously on loan at Red Star)
6	MF	FRA	Kouroufia Kébé (from Orléans)
9	FW	MAR	Ilyes Housni (from Paris Saint-Germain youth)
12	FW	MAD	Ylan El Hadary (on loan from Paris FC, previously on loan at Valenciennes)
17	MF	MTN	Mamadou Fofana (from (Switzerland) Aarau, previously on loan at (Austria) Blau-Weiß Linz)
19	DF	FRA	Thierno Baldé (from Troyes)
22	DF	BEL	Logan Ndenbe (free agent)
28	MF	ALG	Issam Bouaoune (from Châteauroux)
29	FW	FRA	Noam Obougou (on loan from Le Havre)
70	MF	MAR	Nordine Kandil (from Amiens)
88	MF	FRA	Joël-Emmanuel Coulibaly (from Rennes B)

Out:

No.	Pos.	Nation	Player
3	DF	FRA	Justin Bourgault (loan return to Brest)
5	MF	BIH	Ćazim Suljić (to Amiens)
6	MF	FRA	Teddy Bouriaud (to Laval)
9	FW	MLI	Niama Pape Sissoko (loan return to Reims)
12	DF	FRA	Adrien Julloux (to Amiens)
13	MF	MTN	Bakari Camara (to Rouen)
16	GK	FRA	Martin Sourzac (to (Italy) Imperia)
17	MF	FRA	Maxence Carlier (to Ararat-Armenia)
19	DF	HAI	Martin Expérience (to (Belgium) Dender)
20	FW	COD	Brandon Bokangu (to Guingamp)
22	FW	NGR	Jimmy Evans (to (Ecuador) Universidad Católica)
23	DF	FRA	Rayan Bamba (loan return to Rennes)
24	FW	NGR	Victor Orakpo (loan return to Nice)
27	DF	FRA	Faitout Maouassa (free agent)
29	FW	CIV	Patrick Ouotro (to (Portugal) Vitória Guimarães)
34	FW	FRA	Mattheo Guendez (on loan to Paris 13 Atletico)
38	MF	MTN	Youssouf Tandia (on loan to Épinal)
—	FW	FRA	Oumar Sidibé (to Cannes, previously on loan at Paris 13 Atletico)

=== Boulogne ===
In:

No.	Pos.	Nation	Player
7	FW	FRA	Aymane Nassiri (from Istres)
10	MF	FRA	Abdel Hbouch (from Annecy)
13	FW	FRA	Ludéric Etonde (from Bordeaux)
17	FW	BIH	Benjamin Bešić (from Bourg-Péronnas)
20	DF	FRA	Théo Brusco (from (Luxembourg) Differdange 03)
26	DF	FRA	Oscar Lenne (from Lens youth)
29	DF	FRA	Mathieu Mion (from Grenoble)
64	FW	FRA	Théo Epailly (from (Croatia) Gorica)

Out:

No.	Pos.	Nation	Player
3	DF	BEL	Vincent Burlet (loan return to Lille)
5	DF	FRA	Nathan Zohoré (to (Hungary) Ferencváros)
7	MF	FRA	Luka Boiteau (to Valenciennes)
10	MF	FRA	Amine El Farissi (to (Morocco) MAS)
11	FW	FRA	Souleymane Keita (to Dunkerque)
17	FW	FRA	Corentin Fatou (to Laval)
25	DF	FRA	Siad Gourville (to (Belgium) La Louvière)
26	FW	FRA	Gabin Capuano (loan return to Lens)
30	GK	FRA	Azamat Uriev (on loan to Haguenau)
33	DF	CIV	Emmanuel Kouassi (to Le Puy)
—	FW	FRA	Exaucé Mpembele Boula (on loan to Bourg-Péronnas, previously on loan at Paris 13 Atletico)
—	MF	FRA	Lilian Raillot (to Orléans, previously on loan at Paris 13 Atletico)
—	MF	CIV	Hervé Touré (to (Serbia) OFK Beograd, previously on loan at (Serbia) Javor Matis)
—	FW	CIV	Zanga Koné (to Canet Roussillon, previously on loan at Chambly)
—	FW	FRA	Christian Kitenge (to (Luxembourg) Progrès Niederkorn, previously on loan at Saint-Malo)

=== Laval ===
In:

No.	Pos.	Nation	Player
7	MF	FRA	Chafik Gourichy (from Thionville Lusitanos)
8	MF	FRA	Teddy Bouriaud (from Nancy)
9	FW	CIV	Oumar Konaté (on loan from Monaco youth)
13	MF	FRA	Francis Coquelin (from Nantes)
17	FW	FRA	Corentin Fatou (from Boulogne)
18	DF	SEN	Aboubacar Lô (from Amiens)
22	DF	FRA	Jules Gaudin (from (Belgium) Charleroi)
23	DF	FRA	Esteban Mouton (from Orléans)
26	MF	FRA	Hermann Esmel (from Le Puy)
27	MF	FRA	Alpha Diallo (from Lens youth)
28	FW	GAM	Abou Kanté (from Dunkerque)

Out:

No.	Pos.	Nation	Player
4	DF	FRA	Peter Ouaneh (to (Romania) UTA Arad)
5	DF	BEN	Moïse Adiléhou (free agent)
7	DF	FRA	Thibaut Vargas (free agent)
8	MF	FRA	Titouan Thomas (to Fleury)
9	FW	MLI	Mamadou Camara (to Montpellier)
10	MF	FRA	Malik Sellouki (to (Portugal) Rio Ave)
15	FW	BEL	Dylan Mbayo (loan return to (Netherlands) PEC Zwolle)
18	FW	FRA	Malik Tchokounté (to Rouen)
21	DF	FRA	Ylies Aradj (loan return to Toulouse)
22	DF	CIV	Owen Kouassi (loan return to (Italy) Lecce)
23	DF	POR	Yohan Tavares (to UF Touraine)
25	MF	FRA	Enzo Montet (on loan to Thionville Lusitanos)
26	MF	FRA	William Benard (free agent)
34	FW	NED	Eros Maddy (loan return to Auxerre)
—	MF	POR	Loïs Martins (on loan to Avranches, previously on loan at Paris 13 Atletico)
—	FW	FRA	Noa Mupemba (to (Switzerland) Rapperswil-Jona, previously on loan at Châteauroux)
—	FW	FRA	Aymeric Faurand-Tournaire (to (Vietnam) Hà Nội, previously on loan at La Roche-sur-Yon)

=== Dijon ===
In:

No.	Pos.	Nation	Player
15	DF	FRA	Axel Bargain (from GOAL FC)
22	DF	FRA	Tom Meynadier (free agent)
31	DF	FRA	Moussa Faty (from Le Puy)
90	FW	CIV	Ange Lago (from Marseille B)
93	DF	MAR	Ismaïl Bouleghcha (from Le Puy)

Out:

No.	Pos.	Nation	Player
1	GK	FRA	Lenny Montfort (to Bourg-Péronnas)
2	DF	FRA	Ismaïl Diallo (to Toulouse)
3	DF	FRA	Fady Khatir (free agent)
22	FW	FRA	Julien Domingues (to (Saudi Arabia) Al-Kholood)
24	DF	FRA	Brayan Djadja (on loan to Bordeaux)
28	MF	FRA	Loris Dupont (on loan to Châteaubriant)
—	DF	FRA	Brayan Djadja (on loan to Istres, previously on loan at Bordeaux)
—	MF	FRA	Jules Meyer (to (Bulgaria) CSKA 1948, previously on loan at Bourg-Péronnas)

=== Sochaux ===
In:

No.	Pos.	Nation	Player
5	FW	FRA	Samy Baghdadi (from Valenciennes, previously on loan)
11	FW	HAI	Louicius Deedson (from (United States) FC Dallas)
19	MF	FRA	Victor Lobry (from Amiens)
24	MF	FRA	Yohan Demoncy (from Reims, previously on loan at Guingamp)
29	FW	FRA	Ethan Cortes (free agent)
77	FW	CIV	Landry Nomel (from (Switzerland) Stade Lausanne Ouchy)
91	FW	FRA	Mathis Clairicia (from (Germany) VfL Bochum, previously on loan at (Portugal) Alverca)
97	DF	MAR	Saad Agouzoul (from Auxerre, previously on loan at (Cyprus) Omonia)

Out:

No.	Pos.	Nation	Player
6	MF	CPV	Elson Mendes (to (Turkey) Kasımpaşa)
12	FW	MLI	Aboubacar Sidibé (on loan to Paris 13 Atletico)
18	DF	FRA	Enzo-Noël Dodé (on loan to Paris 13 Atletico)
20	DF	SEN	Prince Mendy (free agent)
22	FW	FRA	Solomon Loubao (loan return to (Italy) Monza)
28	FW	ALG	Aymen Boutoutaou (to (Romania) FCSB)
—	DF	ALG	Abderrezzek Saidi (to (Spain) Unionistas, previously on loan)
—	DF	GUI	Lamine Touré (to (Luxembourg) UNA Strassen, previously on loan at Montlouis)

== See also ==
- 2026–27 Ligue 1
- 2026–27 Ligue 2
