= 2025–26 Coupe de France =

Football tournament season

Tournament details
- Country: France
- Dates: 13 September 2025 – 22 May 2026

Final positions
- Champions: Lens (1st title)
- Runners-up: Nice

The 2025–26 Coupe de France was the 109th season of the main football cup competition of France. The competition was organised by the French Football Federation (FFF) and was open to all clubs in French football, as well as clubs from the overseas departments and territories (Guadeloupe, French Guiana, Martinique, Mayotte, Tahiti, Réunion, Saint Martin, Saint Pierre and Miquelon, and New Caledonia).

Paris Saint-Germain were the two-time defending champions, having defeated Reims 3–0 in the previous year's final for a record-extending sixteenth Coupe de France title, but were eliminated in the round of 32 by Paris FC.

In the final, Lens defeated Nice 3–1 for their first Coupe de France title.

== Dates ==
Dates for the first two qualifying rounds, and any preliminaries required, were set by the individual Regional leagues. From round three, the FFF defined the calendar, with rounds up to and including the round of 32 being scheduled for weekends and later rounds up to, but not including, the final, taking place on midweek evenings.

Round	Dates
Third round	13 September 2025
Fourth round	27 September 2025
Fifth round	11 October 2025
Sixth round	25 October 2025
Seventh round	15 November 2025
Eighth round	29 November 2025
Round of 64	20 December 2025
Round of 32	10 January 2026
Round of 16	4 February 2026
Quarter-finals	4 March 2026
Semi-finals	22 April 2026
Final	22 May 2026

== Teams ==
=== Rounds 1 to 6 ===
Every district-level and regional level teams could join in the first round or get exempted to the second or third round. The exempted regional level teams, the teams from National 3 and a team from Saint Pierre and Miquelon joined the competition in the third round. The teams from National 2 joined the competition at the fourth round. The teams from National joined the competition at the fifth round.

=== Number of teams per division and per round ===
Below was the number of teams per level according to the rounds.

Rounds► ▼Divisions	Regional Phase						Federal Phase		Final Phase					
Rounds► ▼Divisions	R1	R2	R3	R4	R5	R6	R7	R8	1/32	1/16	1/8	1/4	SF	F
L1 (1)	ø								18	15	10	7	4	2
L2 (2)	ø						18	16	12	8	6	1		
N1 (3)	ø				17	13	12	7	5	3				
N2 (4)	ø			47	43	35	24	14	10	3				
N3 (5)	ø		81	78	64	50	34	20	9	1				
R1 (6)	ø	85	245	201	144	93	44	26	8	2				
R2 (7)	16	523	416	269	148	55	23	4	1					
R3 (8)	246	871	581	295	125	41	14	1						
R4 (Note: Regional 4 only existed in Corsica as the last level: there was no departmental championship.) (9)	ø	5	2	1	ø									
D1 (9)	1081	887	496	168	48	18	4	ø						
D2 (10)	1589	880	296	89	19	3	ø							
D3 (11)	1314	548	157	48	11	2	ø							
D4 (12)	593	177	31	7	1	ø								
D5 (13)	251	69	14	5	ø									
D6 (14)	60	17	3	ø										
D7 (15)	12	1	ø											
Overseas territories	ø		+1 (Note: Entrance of the team from Saint Pierre and Miquelon.)	ø			+3 (Note: Entrance of the teams from Tahiti, Mayotte and New Caledonia. New Caledonia played at home.)	+4 (Note: Entrance of the teams from Réunion, Martinique, Guadeloupe and French Guiana.)	1	ø				
Total	5162	4063	2295	1206	620	310	176	92	64	32	16	8	4	2

== Round 7 ==
The 176 teams were divided into nine distinct groups of equal level and geography to avoid long travel. These were the 155 clubs that qualified from the sixth round, the 18 clubs from Ligue 2 and clubs from Mayotte, New Caledonia and Tahiti

=== Overseas playoff ties ===
Two teams each from French Guiana, Guadeloupe, Martinique and Réunion faced each other internally to decide their respective representative for Round 8.

15 November 2025	CS Moulien (Guadeloupe)	2–3	(Guadeloupe) AS Gosier	Le Moule, Guadeloupe
15:30 AST		Report		Stadium: Stade Jacques Ponrémy; Referee: Olivier Valcin

15 November 2025	AS Étoile de Matoury (French Guiana)	1–1 (2–3 p)	(French Guiana) ASC Le Geldar	Remire-Montjoly, French Guiana
15:45 UTC−03:00		Report		Stadium: Stade Edmard Lama; Referee: Yannick Ponet

16 November 2025	Saint-Pauloise FC (Réunion)	1–0	(Réunion) ES Dominicaine	Saint-Denis, Réunion
15:45 UTC+04:00		Report		Stadium: Stade Jean-Ivoula; Referee: Stephane Bruno Fontaine

17 November 2025	Espoir de Sainte-Luce (Martinique)	0–0 (5–4 p)	(Martinique) Eveil des Trois-Ilets	Fort de France, Martinique
19:00 AST		Report		Stadium: Stade Pierre Aliker; Referee: François Merille

=== Overseas team hosting mainland team ===
15 November 2025	AS Magenta (New Caledonia)	0–3	FC Mulhouse (5)	Nouméa, New Caledonia
15:00 UTC+11:00				Stadium: Stade Numa-Daly

=== Other notable matches ===
14 November 2025	AS Cannes	1–2	FC Annecy

14 November 2025	Olympique Villefontaine	0–3	Grenoble Foot 38

15 November 2025	US Avranches	0–0 (5–3 p)	Paris 13 Atletico

15 November 2025	Olympique Charleville Prix AM	0–1	Reims

15 November 2025	Auby	0–3	Amiens

15 November 2025	Montreuil FC	1–0	Bandrélé FC (Mayotte)

== Round 8 ==
28 November 2025	Concarneau (3)	1–0	Stade Briochin (3)	Concarneau
19:30 CET (UTC+1)	Samoura 53'	Report		Stadium: Stade Guy-Piriou; Referee: Tifenn Leprodhomme

28 November 2025	FC Annecy (2)	1–2	Grenoble (2)	Annecy
20:00 CET (UTC+1)	Rambaud 5'	Report	Diba 67'; Diaby 79'	Stadium: Parc des Sports (Annecy); Referee: Alexandre Perreau Niel

28 November 2025	Sarreguemines (6)	3–4	Nancy (2)	Sarreguemines
20:00 CET (UTC+1)	Mokhtefi 49'; Schnepp 67', 87'	Report	Ouotro 20', 58'; Camara 32'; Guendez 90'	Stadium: Stade de la Blies; Referee: Dorian Bovolenta

29 November 2025	US Torcy (5)	1–5	Reims (2)	Torcy, Seine-et-Marne
13:30 CET (UTC+1)		Report		Stadium: Complexe Sportif du Fremoy; Referee: Pierre Retail

29 November 2025	FC Bogny (6)	0–3	Lusitanos Saint-Maur (4)	Bogny-sur-Meuse
13:30 CET (UTC+1)				Stadium: Stade Municipal Pierre Malicet; Referee: Quentin Fourel

29 November 2025	FCMB (6)	0–2	Montpellier (2)	Montceau-les-Mines
13:30 CET (UTC+1)

== Round of 64 ==
The round of 64 draw was split into three groups, roughly by geography, with Ligue 1 teams distributed evenly. The draw was made on 1 December 2025.

=== Group A ===
19 December 2025	Canet Roussillon (5)	0–1	Montpellier (2)	Perpignan (Note: Match was relocated as the club's home stadium was not approved for hosting)
20:45 CET (UTC+1)		Report	Mendy 76'	Stadium: Stade Gilbert Brutus; Attendance: 3,944; Referee: Azzedine Souifi

20 December 2025	Lyon-La Duchère (5)	1–2	Toulouse (1)	Lyon
18:00 CET (UTC+1)	Etien 67' (pen.)	Report	Emersonn 51'; Dønnum 56'	Stadium: Stade de Balmont; Attendance: 3,000; Referee: Florent Batta

20 December 2025	Grenoble (2)	1–1 (3–5 p)	Nancy (2)	Grenoble
18:00 CET (UTC+1)	Zahui 53'	Report	Tacafred 90+2'	Stadium: Stade des Alpes; Attendance: 2,851; Referee: Karim Abed
	Penalties
	Benet (penalty scored); Mouyokolo (penalty scored); Mbock (penalty missed); Zahui (penalty missed)		(penalty scored) Bamba; (penalty scored) Bokangu; (penalty scored) Carlier; (penalty scored) Ztouti; (penalty scored) Gélin

20 December 2025	SA Mérignac (6)	0–0 (5–6 p)	Istres (4)	Mérignac
18:00 CET (UTC+1)		Report		Stadium: Stade Robert Brettes; Attendance: 3,152; Referee: Arnaud Baert
	Penalties
	Akono (penalty missed); Wallot (penalty scored); Sané (penalty scored); Romero (penalty scored); Dia (penalty scored); Vindex (penalty scored); Calavia (penalty missed)		(penalty scored) Badu; (penalty scored) Nassiri; (penalty scored) Kadir; (penalty missed) Cara; (penalty scored) Yara; (penalty scored) Marre; (penalty scored) N'Kulu

21 December 2025	Nice (1)	2–1	Saint-Étienne (2)	Nice
14:45 CET (UTC+1)	Diallo 11'; Sanson 72'	Report	Davitashvili 45' (pen.)	Stadium: Allianz Riviera; Attendance: 0 Referee: Gaël Angoula

21 December 2025	Bourg-Péronnas (3)	0–6	Marseille (1)	Bourg-en-Bresse
14:45 CET (UTC+1)		Report	Balerdi 8'; Greenwood 59'; Højbjerg 64'; Paixão 66'; Nadir 77'; Mmadi 87'	Stadium: Stade Marcel-Verchère; Attendance: 5,632; Referee: Stéphanie Frappart

21 December 2025	Auxerre (1)	1–2	Monaco (1)	Auxerre
14:45 CET (UTC+1)	Dioussé 29' (pen.)	Report	Biereth 8', 74'	Stadium: Stade de l'Abbé-Deschamps; Attendance: 9,833; Referee: Romain Lissorgue

21 December 2025	Le Puy Foot 43 (3)	1–0	Bordeaux (4)	Le Puy-en-Velay
17:30 CET (UTC+1)	Adélaïde 90+1' (pen.)	Report		Stadium: Stade Charles-Massot; Attendance: 3,869; Referee: Hakim Ben El Hadj

21 December 2025	Bassin Arcachon (5)	0–1	Hauts Lyonnais (5)	Arcachon
17:30 CET (UTC+1)		Report	Jeanpierre 90+1'	Stadium: Stade Jean Brousse; Attendance: 1,177; Referee: Ahmed Taleb

21 December 2025	Lyon (1)	3–0	Saint-Cyr Collonges (6)	Décines-Charpieu
21:00 CET (UTC+1)	Abner 52'; Šulc 85', 90'	Report		Stadium: Parc Olympique Lyonnais; Attendance: 28,067; Referee: Jérémie Pignard

=== Group B ===
19 December 2025	IC Croix (5)	0–4	Reims (2)	Croix
20:45 CET (UTC+1)		Report	Sekine 10'; Bassette 28'; Bojang 34'; Teuma 45+2'	Stadium: Stade Henri Seigneur; Attendance: 1,807; Referee: Brendan Roffet

19 December 2025	Lens (1)	3–1	Feignies (4)	Lens
21:00 CET (UTC+1)	Fofana 17'; Abdulhamid 45+1'; Bulatović 68'	Report	Bonte 85'	Stadium: Stade Bollaert-Delelis; Attendance: 37,217; Referee: Guillaume Paradis

20 December 2025	Freyming (7)	0–3	Chantilly (4)	Saint-Avold
15:30 CET (UTC+1)		Report	Traoré 68'; Koné 77'; Doumbia 90+2'	Stadium: Stade du Centre; Attendance: 1,431; Referee: Robin Chapapria

20 December 2025	Biesheim (4)	0–3	Metz (1)	Biesheim
15:30 CET (UTC+1)		Report	Traoré 9', 46'; Sané 65'	Stadium: Stade Municipal; Attendance: 2,464; Referee: Bastien Dechepy

20 December 2025	Olympique Marcquois (6)	1–3	Troyes (2)	Marcq-en-Barœul
15:30 CET (UTC+1)	Diaby 8'	Report	Odede 52'; Diop 78'; Bentayeb 81'	Stadium: Stade Georges Niquet; Attendance: 2,210; Referee: Eddy Rosier

20 December 2025	Saint-Maur (4)	0–1	Lille (1)	Créteil
15:30 CET (UTC+1)		Report	Broholm 80'	Stadium: Stade Dominique Duvauchelle; Attendance: 6,576; Referee: Mikael Lesage

20 December 2025	Stade Béthunois (6)	2–4	Sochaux (3)	Béthune
18:00 CET (UTC+1)	Niangadou 32', 90+6'	Report	Djoco 61' (pen.); Mendes 78', 89'; Fofana 83'	Stadium: Stade Hermant-Deprez; Attendance: 2,418; Referee: Mickaël Leleu

20 December 2025	Raon-l'Étape (5)	0–3	Paris FC (1)	Raon-l'Étape
18:00 CET (UTC+1)		Report	Ikoné 32', 79', 87' (pen.)	Stadium: Stade Paul Gasser; Attendance: 2,776; Referee: Aurelien Petit

21 December 2025	Strasbourg (1)	2–1	Dunkerque (2)	Strasbourg
14:45 CET (UTC+1)	Enciso 26'; Doukouré 40'	Report	Robinet 54' (pen.)	Stadium: Stade de la Meinau; Attendance: 27,707; Referee: Benoît Bastien

21 December 2025	Orléans (3)	3–0	Dieppe (4)	Orléans
17:30 CET (UTC+1)	Morel 26'; El Khoumisti 80' (pen.); Ba 86'	Report		Stadium: Stade de la Source; Attendance: 2,629; Referee: Thomas Léonard

21 December 2025	Le Havre (1)	0–2	Amiens (2)	Le Havre
17:30 CET (UTC+1)		Report	Hamache 11'; Kaiboue 30'	Stadium: Stade Océane; Attendance: 9,718; Referee: Antoine Valnet

=== Group C ===
19 December 2025	Périgny (6)	1–2	Le Mans (2)	Périgny
20:45 CET (UTC+1)	Rousseau 45+1' (pen.)	Report	Luvambo 8'; Robin 71'	Stadium: Stade Municipal; Attendance: 3,122; Referee: Benjamin Lepaysant

19 December 2025	Les Herbiers (4)	0–0 (5–6 p)	Angers (1)	Les Herbiers
20:45 CET (UTC+1)		Report		Stadium: Stade Massabielle; Attendance: 4,600; Referee: Jérôme Brisard
	Penalties
	Billy (penalty scored); Rissonga (penalty missed); Butrot (penalty scored); Lebas (penalty scored); Kerriou (penalty scored); Breton (penalty scored); Letard (penalty missed); Lopy (penalty missed)		(penalty scored) Sbaï; (penalty missed) Mouton; (penalty scored) Machine; (penalty scored) Chérif; (penalty scored) Raolisoa; (penalty scored) Sinaté; (penalty missed) Peter; (penalty scored) Courcoul

19 December 2025	Avranches (4)	1–1 (5–4 p)	Brest (1)	Avranches
20:45 CET (UTC+1)	Sabihi 23'	Report	Labeau-Lascary 34'	Stadium: Stade René-Fenouillère; Attendance: 3,576; Referee: Geoffrey Kubler
	Penalties
	Dudouit (penalty scored); Pi (penalty scored); Bourdin (penalty scored); Sopromadze (penalty scored); Sabihi (penalty scored)		(penalty missed) Del Castillo; (penalty scored) Diaz; (penalty scored) Lala; (penalty scored) Baldé; (penalty scored) Labeau-Lascary

19 December 2025	Guingamp (2)	0–1	Laval (2)	Guingamp
20:45 CET (UTC+1)		Report	Sellouki 90+4'	Stadium: Stade de Roudourou; Attendance: 3,436; Referee: Ruddy Buquet

20 December 2025	Bayeux (6)	2–1	Blois (4)	Bayeux
15:30 CET (UTC+1)	Mayette 14'; Renaux 30'	Report	Sommer 50'	Stadium: Stade Henry Jeanne; Attendance: 2,719; Referee: Faouzi Benchabane

20 December 2025	AS Gosier (Guadeloupe)	0–7	Lorient (1)	Bondoufle
15:30 CET (UTC+1)		Report	Dieng 2', 12', 38'; Dermane 24'; Bamba 33', 75'; Sanusi 79'	Stadium: Stade Robert-Bobin; Attendance: 4,097; Referee: Remi Landry

20 December 2025	Pontivy (5)	0–1	Bastia (2)	Pontivy
18:00 CET (UTC+1)		Report	Tomi 79'	Stadium: Stade du Faubourg de Verdun; Attendance: 2,802; Referee: Tifenn Leprodhomme

20 December 2025	Fontenay (4)	0–4	Paris Saint-Germain (1)	Nantes
21:00 CET (UTC+1)		Report	Doué 25'; Dembélé 40' (pen.); Ramos 53', 58'	Stadium: Stade de la Beaujoire; Attendance: 34,599; Referee: Jérémy Stinat

21 December 2025	Concarneau (3)	3–5	Nantes (1)	Concarneau
14:45 CET (UTC+1)	Cozza 18' (o.g.); Samoura 45' (pen.); Soukouna 74'	Report	Deuff 15'; El-Arabi 23'; Centonze 38'; Abline 51', 58'	Stadium: Stade Guy-Piriou; Attendance: 2,999; Referee: Pierre Gaillouste

21 December 2025	Rennes (1)	3–0	Les Sables (5)	Rennes
17:30 CET (UTC+1)	Embolo 69', 80'; Merlin 84'	Report		Stadium: Roazhon Park; Attendance: 15,368; Referee: Alexandre Perreau Niel

21 December 2025	Montreuil (6)	2–1	Chauvigny (5)	Bobigny
17:30 CET (UTC+1)	Kadded 39' (pen.); Adel 81'	Report	Ayadi 18'	Stadium: Stade Auguste Delaune; Attendance: 1,421; Referee: Pierre Legat

== Round of 32 ==
10 January 2026	Montreuil (6)	2–4	Amiens (2)	Bobigny
15:30 CET (UTC+1)	Adel 1'; Benoit 48'	Report	Fofana 9'; Dimi 13'; Averlant 30'; Lutin 46'	Stadium: Stade Auguste Delaune; Attendance: 1,500; Referee: Alexandre Perreau Niel

10 January 2026	Orléans (3)	1–3	Monaco (1)	Orléans
15:30 CET (UTC+1)	El Khoumisti 90+6'	Report	Balogun 27'; Ilenikhena 88', 90+4'	Stadium: Stade de la Source; Attendance: 6,800; Referee: Stéphanie Frappart

10 January 2026	Bastia (2)	0–2	Troyes (2)	Furiani
15:30 CET (UTC+1)		Report	Ripart 29'; Bentayeb 86'	Stadium: Stade Armand Cesari; Attendance: 4,952; Referee: Benoît Millot

10 January 2026	Angers (1)	1–1 (5–6 p)	Toulouse (1)	Angers
15:30 CET (UTC+1)	Sbaï 90+1'	Report	Hidalgo 47'	Stadium: Stade Raymond Kopa; Attendance: 10,072; Referee: Marc Bollengier
	Penalties
	Biumla (penalty scored); Machine (penalty missed); Mouton (penalty scored); Belkebla (penalty scored); Sbaï (penalty scored); Lefort (penalty scored); Courcoul (penalty missed)		(penalty missed) McKenzie; (penalty scored) Gboho; (penalty scored) Cresswell; (penalty scored) Schmidt; (penalty scored) Diop; (penalty scored) Sauer; (penalty scored) Messali

10 January 2026	Le Puy (3)	0–0 (0–3 p)	Reims (2)	Le Puy-en-Velay
18:00 CET (UTC+1)		Report		Stadium: Stade Charles Massot; Attendance: 3,324; Referee: Geoffrey Kubler
	Penalties
	Gromat (penalty missed); Mohamed (penalty missed); Faty (penalty missed)		(penalty scored) Leoni; (penalty scored) Nakamura; (penalty missed) Bojang; (penalty scored) Daramy

10 January 2026	Hauts Lyonnais (3)	1–3	Lorient (1)	Andrézieux-Bouthéon
18:00 CET (UTC+1)	Poncet 17'	Report	Dieng 43', 56'; Koné 87'	Stadium: Envol Stadium; Attendance: 2,647; Referee: Jérôme Brisard

10 January 2026	Istres (4)	0–2	Laval (2)	Fos-sur-Mer
18:00 CET (UTC+1)		Report	Dago 44'; Maggiotti 69'	Stadium: Stade Parsemain; Attendance: 1,121; Referee: Aurélien Petit

10 January 2026	Avranches (4)	0–6	Strasbourg (1)	Avranches
18:00 CET (UTC+1)		Report	Panichelli 14'; Enciso 22', 89'; Moreira 39'; Godo 57'; Nanasi 67'	Stadium: Stade René Fenouillère; Attendance: 4,021; Referee: Mathieu Vernice

11 January 2026	Sochaux (3)	0–3	Lens (1)	Montbéliard
14:00 CET (UTC+1)		Report	Édouard 22'; Udol 87'; Sima 89'	Stadium: Stade Auguste Bonal; Attendance: 19,210; Referee: Romain Lissorgue

11 January 2026	Nantes (1)	1–1 (3–5 p)	Nice (1)	Nantes
18:00 CET (UTC+1)	Guirassy 52'	Report	Diop 25'	Stadium: Stade de la Beaujoire; Attendance: 19,451; Referee: Eric Wattellier
	Penalties
	Abline (penalty scored); El-Arabi (penalty missed); Cozza (penalty scored); Ganago (penalty scored)		(penalty scored) Bard; (penalty scored) Clauss; (penalty scored) Wahi; (penalty scored) Everton; (penalty scored) Carlos

11 January 2026	Le Mans (2)	0–0 (4–1 p)	Nancy (2)	Le Mans
18:00 CET (UTC+1)		Report		Stadium: Stade Marie-Marvingt; Attendance: 5,113; Referee: Antoine Valnet
	Penalties
	Guillaume (penalty scored); Calodat (penalty scored); Robin (penalty scored); Gueye (penalty scored)		(penalty missed) Ouotro; (penalty missed) Fernandez; (penalty scored) Expérience

11 January 2026	Metz (1)	0–4	Montpellier (2)	Longeville-lès-Metz
18:00 CET (UTC+1)		Report	Savanier 8' (pen.); Issoufou 21'; Tchato 46'; Pays 64'	Stadium: Stade Saint-Symphorien; Attendance: 7,177; Referee: Willy Delajod

11 January 2026	Chantilly (4)	1–3	Rennes (1)	Beauvais
18:00 CET (UTC+1)	Joseph 42'	Report	Merlin 70'; Al-Taamari 71'; Quiñonez 78'	Stadium: Stade Pierre Brisson; Attendance: 7,526; Referee: Jérémie Pignard

11 January 2026	Lille (1)	1–2	Lyon (1)	Villeneuve-d'Ascq
21:00 CET (UTC+1)	Ngoy 28'	Report	Moreira 1'; Endrick 42'	Stadium: Stade Pierre-Mauroy; Attendance: 20,333; Referee: Clément Turpin

12 January 2026	Paris Saint-Germain (1)	0–1	Paris FC (1)	Paris
21:10 CET (UTC+1)		Report	Ikoné 74'	Stadium: Parc des Princes; Attendance: 47,000; Referee: Ruddy Buquet

13 January 2026	Bayeux (6)	0–9	Marseille (1)	Caen
21:00 CET (UTC+1)		Report	Gomes 13'; Traorè 19'; Greenwood 26', 49', 90'; Gouiri 32', 55'; Egan-Riley 80'; Maupay 86'	Stadium: Stade Michel d'Ornano; Attendance: 19,955; Referee: Gaël Angoula

== Round of 16 ==
3 February 2026	Reims (2)	3–0	Le Mans (2)	Reims
20:30 CET (UTC+1)	Leoni 38', 71'; Benhattab 85'	Report		Stadium: Stade Auguste-Delaune; Attendance: 8,204; Referee: Willy Delajod

3 February 2026	Marseille (1)	3–0	Rennes (1)	Marseille
21:10 CET (UTC+1)	Gouiri 2'; Greenwood 46'; Aubameyang 83'	Report		Stadium: Stade Vélodrome; Attendance: 61,783; Referee: Thomas Léonard

4 February 2026	Toulouse (1)	1–0	Amiens (2)	Toulouse
20:30 CET (UTC+1)	Gboho 39'	Report		Stadium: Stadium de Toulouse; Attendance: 16,109; Referee: Hakim Ben El Hadj

4 February 2026	Nice (1)	3–2	Montpellier (2)	Nice
20:30 CET (UTC+1)	Boudache 72'; Mendy 89'; Diop 90+7'	Report	Mincarelli 3'; Mendy 69'	Stadium: Allianz Riviera; Attendance: 17,949; Referee: Romain Lissorgue

4 February 2026	Lyon (1)	2–0	Laval (2)	Décines-Charpieu
20:30 CET (UTC+1)	Endrick 80'; Hautbois 90+4' (o.g.)	Report		Stadium: Parc Olympique Lyonnais; Attendance: 24,678; Referee: Ruddy Buquet

4 February 2026	Lorient (1)	2–0	Paris FC (1)	Lorient
20:30 CET (UTC+1)	Cadiou 55'; Mbow 82' (o.g.)	Report		Stadium: Stade du Moustoir; Attendance: 13,457; Referee: Mathieu Vernice

4 February 2026	Troyes (2)	2–4	Lens (1)	Troyes
21:00 CET (UTC+1)	Adeline 45+4'; Ripart 63'	Report	Sotoca 41'; Sima 50', 58'; Bulatović 52'	Stadium: Stade de l'Aube; Attendance: 15,362; Referee: Gaël Angoula

5 February 2026	Strasbourg (1)	3–1	Monaco (1)	Strasbourg
21:00 CET (UTC+1)	Godo 7'; Enciso 55', 61'	Report	Biereth 58'	Stadium: Stade de la Meinau; Attendance: 29,586; Referee: Jérémy Stinat

== Quarter-finals ==
3 March 2026	Strasbourg (1)	2–1	Reims (2)	Strasbourg
21:00 CET (UTC+1)	Panichelli 83' (pen.); Enciso 87' (pen.)	Report	Zabi 90+4'	Stadium: Stade de la Meinau; Attendance: 29,848; Referee: Eric Wattellier

4 March 2026	Lorient (1)	0–0 (5–6 p)	Nice (1)	Lorient
20:30 CET (UTC+1)		Report		Stadium: Stade du Moustoir; Attendance: 15,465; Referee: Bastien Dechepy
	Penalties
	Cadiou (penalty scored); Talbi (penalty scored); Kouassi (penalty scored); Soumano (penalty missed); Avom (penalty missed); Katseris (penalty scored); Faye (penalty scored); Meïté (penalty missed)		(penalty missed) Bernardeau; (penalty scored) Clauss; (penalty missed) Louchet; (penalty scored) Sanson; (penalty scored) Kevin Carlos; (penalty scored) Mendy; (penalty scored) Vanhoutte; (penalty scored) Cho

4 March 2026	Marseille (1)	2–2 (3–4 p)	Toulouse (1)	Marseille
21:00 CET (UTC+1)	Greenwood 2' (pen.); Paixão 56'	Report	Gboho 13'; Cresswell 61'	Stadium: Stade Vélodrome; Attendance: 63,465; Referee: Jérémie Pignard
	Penalties
	Greenwood (penalty scored); Aubameyang (penalty scored); Balerdi (penalty missed); Aguerd (penalty scored); Nwaneri (penalty missed)		(penalty scored) Dønnum; (penalty scored) Gboho; (penalty scored) Sidibé; (penalty missed) Cásseres; (penalty scored) Diop

5 March 2026	Lyon (1)	2–2 (4–5 p)	Lens (1)	Décines-Charpieu
21:10 CET (UTC+1)	Yaremchuk 67'; Himbert 90+4'	Report	Thauvin 23'; Sima 45+1'	Stadium: Parc Olympique Lyonnais; Attendance: 47,879; Referee: Benoît Bastien
	Penalties
	Karabec (penalty scored); Tolisso (penalty scored); Morton (penalty scored); Niakhaté (penalty missed); Endrick (penalty scored)		(penalty scored) Fofana; (penalty scored) Abdulhamid; (penalty scored) Udol; (penalty scored) Sangaré; (penalty scored) Thauvin

== Semi-finals ==
21 April 2026	Lens (1)	4–1	Toulouse (1)	Lens
21:10 CEST (UTC+2)	Thauvin 9' (pen.); Saint-Maximin 18'; Udol 35'; Thomasson 74'	Report	Hidalgo 21'	Stadium: Stade Bollaert-Delelis; Attendance: 38,269; Referee: Willy Delajod

22 April 2026	Strasbourg (1)	0–2	Nice (1)	Strasbourg
21:00 CEST (UTC+2)		Report	Wahi 51', 82' (pen.)	Stadium: Stade de la Meinau; Attendance: 30,596; Referee: François Letexier

== Final ==
22 May 2026
21:00 CEST

Lens	3–1	Nice
Thauvin 25'; Édouard 42'; Sima 78'	Report	Coulibaly 45+3'

Stade de France, Saint-Denis
Attendance: 24,672
Referee: Jérôme Brisard
