= 2024–25 FC Metz season =

FC Metz
2024–25 season
- Manager: Stéphane Le Mignan
- Stadium: Stade Saint-Symphorien
- Ligue 2: 3rd (promoted)
- Coupe de France: Round of 64
Home colours	Away colours

The 2024–25 season is the 93rd season in the history of the FC Metz, and the club's first season back in Ligue 2. In addition to the domestic league, the team will participate in the Coupe de France.

== Transfers ==
=== Out ===
Pos.	Player	Transferred to	Fee	Date	Source
FW	(Georgia (country)) Georges Mikautadze	(France) Lyon	€18,500,000	18 July 2024	
DF	(Martinique) Christophe Hérelle	(Turkey) Bodrum	Undisclosed	23 July 2024	
MF	(Senegal) Lamine Camara	Monaco	€15,000,000	30 July 2024	

== Friendlies ==
=== Pre-season ===
12 July 2024 Friendly	Metz (France)	4–0	(Luxembourg) Jeunesse Esch
18:00	Sané 8'; Bokele 73', 75'; Moussa 86'

20 July 2024 Friendly	Metz (France)	3–0	(France) Villefranche
17:00	Pean 31' (o.g.); Sané 44'; Fall 77'

24 July 2024 Friendly	Metz (France)	5–1	(Belgium) Francs Borains
17:00

27 July 2024 Friendly	Wehen Wiesbaden (Germany)	0–2	(France) Metz
13:00

31 July 2024 Friendly	Metz (France)	0–0	(France) UNFP

3 August 2024 Friendly	Metz (France)	0–3	(Italy) Torino
17:00

== Competitions ==
=== Overall record ===
Competition	First match	Last match	Starting round	Record							
Competition	First match	Last match	Starting round	Pld	W	D	L	GF	GA	GD	Win %
Ligue 2	16–18 August 2024	10 May 2025	Matchday 1	0	0	0	0	0	0	+0	—
Coupe de France				0	0	0	0	0	0	+0	—
Total				0	0	0	0	0	0	+0	—

Source: Soccerway

=== Ligue 2 ===
==== League table ====
Pos	Team	Pld	W	D	L	GF	GA	GD	Pts	Promotion or Relegation
1	Lorient (C, P)	34	22	5	7	68	31	+37	71	Promotion to Ligue 1
2	Paris FC (P)	34	21	6	7	55	33	+22	69	Promotion to Ligue 1
3	Metz (O, P)	34	18	11	5	63	34	+29	65	Qualification for promotion play-offs final
4	Dunkerque	34	17	5	12	47	40	+7	56	Qualification for promotion play-offs semi-final
5	Guingamp	34	17	4	13	57	45	+12	55	Qualification for promotion play-offs semi-final

Source: Ligue 2
Rules for classification: 1) Points; 2) Goal difference; 3) Number of goals scored; 4) Head-to-head goal difference; 5) Fair play points
(C) Champions; (O) Play-off winners; (P) Promoted

==== Results summary ====
Overall								Home						Away					
Pld	W	D	L	GF	GA	GD	Pts	W	D	L	GF	GA	GD	W	D	L	GF	GA	GD
21	10	8	3	31	15	+16	38	7	4	0	22	6	+16	3	4	3	9	9	0

Last updated: 31 January 2025.
Source: soccerway

===== Results by round =====
Round	1	2	3	4	5	6	7	8	9	10	11	12	13	14	15	16	17	18	19	20	21	22	23	24	25
Ground	H	A	H	A	H	H	A	H	A	H	A	A	H	A	H	A	H	A	H	H	A	H	A	H	A
Result	D	W	D	W	D	W	L	W	L	W	L	W	W	D	W	D	D	D	W	W	D				
Position	10	4	8	5	5	1	6	4	5	4	6	5	4	4	3	4	4	4	2	2	3				

Updated to match(es) played on 31 January 2025. Source: worldfootball
A = Away; H = Home; W = Win; D = Draw; L = Loss

==== Matches ====
The match schedule was released on 21 June 2024.

19 August 2024 1	Metz	1–1	Bastia	Metz
	Jallow 90+8'	Report	Boutrah 38'	Stadium: Stade Saint-Symphorien; Referee: Aurélien Petit

23 August 2024 2	Rodez	1–3	Metz	Rodez
20:00 CET	Haag (yellow card) 37'; Jean (yellow card) 45+1' (yellow-red card) 45+4'; Younoussa 59'	Report	Sabaly 1' 30'; Colin (yellow card) 15'; Ngouyamsa 44' (o.g.); Hein (yellow card) 74'; Atta (yellow card) 82'; Fali Candé (yellow card) 89'	Stadium: Stade Paul-Lignon; Attendance: 4,901; Referee: (France) Rémi Landry

31 August 2024 3	Metz	1–1	Laval	Metz
14:30 CET	Sabaly (yellow card) 90+1'; Traoré 90+4'	Report	Thomas 5'; Kouassi (yellow card) 73'	Stadium: Stade Saint-Symphorien; Attendance: 18,369; Referee: (France) Florent Batta

14 September 2024 4	Paris FC	1–2	Metz	Paris
14:30 CET	Dicko 31'; Tourraine (yellow card) 76'	Report	Sabaly 13'; Udol 25' (yellow card) 71'; Deminguet (yellow card) 30'; Sané (yellow card) 38'	Stadium: Stade Sébastien Charléty; Attendance: 10,283; Referee: (France) Mickaël Leleu

21 September 2024 5	Metz	1–1	Lorient	Metz
14:30 CET	Sabaly 27'; Kouao (yellow card) 53'; Udol (yellow card) 90+3'	Report	Abergel (yellow card) 68'; Mendy (yellow card) 78'; Bamba 85'	Stadium: Stade Saint-Symphorien; Attendance: 17,970; Referee: (France) Marc Bollengier

24 September 2024 6	Metz	6–0	Martigues	Metz
20:30 CET	Sabaly 35' 45+3' 48'; Udol 37' 70' (yellow card) 84'; Sané 81'	Report	Moussiti-Oko (yellow card) 24'; Oucasse Mendy (yellow card) 57'	Stadium: Stade Saint-Symphorien; Attendance: 16,675; Referee: (France) Olivier Thual

28 September 2024 7	Troyes	2–1	Metz	Troyes
20:00 CET	Ba 42'; Cyriaque Irié (yellow card) 58'; Saïd (yellow card) 65'; Ripart 80' (pen.); Diop (yellow card) 82'	Report	Sané (yellow card) 33'; Traoré 78'; Udol (yellow card) 79'	Stadium: Stade de l'Aube; Attendance: 4,974; Referee: (France) Antoine Valnet

5 October 2024 8	Metz	3–2	Amiens SC	Metz
20:00 CET	Hein 15' 43' (yellow card) 49'; Sabaly 21'; Kouao (yellow card) 29'; Sané (yellow card) 90+3'	Report	Leautey 45+2'; Corchia (yellow card) 56'; Kaïboué 76'; Lutin (yellow card) 85'	Stadium: Stade Saint-Symphorien; Attendance: 18,279; Referee: (France) Hakim Ben El Hadj

18 October 2024 9	Grenoble Foot 38	2–0	Metz	Grenoble
20:00 CET	Ba 31'; Olaitan 90+2'	Report	Colin (yellow card) 60'; Sané (yellow card) 87'	Stadium: Stade des Alpes; Attendance: 5,916; Referee: (France) Faouzi Benchabane

25 October 2024 10	Metz	1–0	Guingamp	Metz
20:00 CET	Diallo 71'	Report		Stadium: Stade Saint-Symphorien; Attendance: 19,290; Referee: (France) Ahmed Taleb

29 October 2024 11	Red Star	1–0	Metz	Saint-Ouen-sur-Seine
20:30 CET	Escartin (yellow card) 13'; Oukidja 47' (o.g.); Doucouré (yellow card) 73'	Report	Jallow (yellow card) 23'	Stadium: Stade Bauer; Attendance: 4,643; Referee: (France) Robin Chapapria

4 November 2024 12	Ajaccio	0–1	Metz	Ajaccio
20:45 CET	Ibayi (yellow card) 89'	Report	Hein 30'	Stadium: Stade Michel Moretti; Attendance: 2,757; Referee: (France) Ruddy Buquet

9 November 2024 13	Metz	1–0	Caen	Metz
20:00 CET	Morgan Bokele (yellow card) 18'; Hein 26'; Traoré (yellow card) 45+1'; Van Den Kerkhof (yellow card) 60'	Report		Stadium: Stade Saint-Symphorien; Attendance: 18,481; Referee: (France) Antoine Valnet

22 November 2024 14	Clermont	1–1	Metz	Clermont-Ferrand
20:00 CET	Baaloudj 14' (yellow card) 56'; Keïta (yellow card) 21'	Report	Sané 27'; Stambouli (yellow card) 78'	Stadium: Stade Gabriel-Montpied; Attendance: 4,674; Referee: (France) Karim Abed

9 December 2024 15	Metz	2–0	Dunkerque	Metz
20:45 CET	Kouao (yellow card) 61'; Hein 90' (pen.); Asoro 90+3'	Report	Raghouber (yellow card) 21'; Georgen (yellow card) 70'; Abner (yellow card) 88'; Bammou (yellow card) 89'	Stadium: Stade Saint-Symphorien; Attendance: 17,897; Referee: (France) Abdelatif Kherradji

14 December 2024 16	Annecy	0–0	Metz	Annecy
20:00 CET	Quentin Paris (yellow card) 86'	Report		Stadium: Parc des Sports; Attendance: 8,319; Referee: (France) Ahmed Taleb

4 January 2025 17	Metz	0–0	Pau	Metz
14:00 CET	Lô (yellow card) 39'	Report	Ruiz (yellow card) 13'; Ahoussou (yellow card) 34'	Stadium: Stade Saint-Symphorien; Attendance: 18,222; Referee: (France) Rémi Landry

11 January 2025 18	Lorient	0–0	Metz	Lorient
20:00 CET	Laporte (yellow card) 70'; Yongwa (yellow card) 74'; Ponceau (yellow card) 87'; Igor Silva (yellow card) 90+1'	Report	Van Den Kerkhof (yellow card) 88'	Stadium: Stade du Moustoir - Yves Allainmat; Attendance: 13,529; Referee: (France) Faouzi Benchabane

18 January 2025 19	Metz	3–1	Paris FC	Metz
14:00 CET	Diallo 16' 71'; Udol (yellow card) 30'; Jallow (yellow card) 50'; Idrissa Gueye 55'; Hein (yellow card) 90+2'	Report	Krasso 28'; De Smet (yellow card) 39'; Tourraine (yellow card) 90+4'	Stadium: Stade Saint-Symphorien; Attendance: 19,526; Referee: (France) Mikael Lesage

24 January 2025 20	Metz	3–0	Grenoble Foot 38	Metz
20:00 CET	Diallo 42'; Sabaly 56'; Idrissa Gueye (yellow card) 62'; Asoro 90+3'	Report	Kerouedan (yellow card) 17'; Diarra (yellow card) 62'	Stadium: Stade Saint-Symphorien; Attendance: 17,231; Referee: (France) Ahmed Taleb

31 January 2025 21	Bastia	1–1	Metz	Furiani
20:00 CET	Maxime Blé 11'; Etoga (yellow card) 39' (yellow-red card) 64'; Vincent (yellow card) 43'; Inao (yellow card) 57'; Meynadier (yellow card) 58'; Placide (yellow card) 89'	Report	Idrissa Gueye (yellow card) 45+1'; Hein 90+5' (pen.)	Stadium: Stade Armand-Cesari; Attendance: 8,435; Referee: (France) Florent Batta

8 February 2025 22	Metz	–	Clermont	Metz
20:00 CET				Stadium: Stade Saint-Symphorien

=== Coupe de France ===
16 November 2024 Round 7	FCSR Obernai	0-3	Metz	Obernai
13:45 CET	Salim Hambali (red card) 90+3'	Report	Sané 63'; Elisor 72'; Sané 90'	Stadium: Stade Municipal d'Obernai; Attendance: 2,855; Referee: (France) William Toulliou

29 November 2024 Round 8	Raon-l'Étape	0-1	Metz	Raon-l'Étape
19:30 CET	Gabin Delguel (yellow card) 16'; Theo Florentin (yellow card) 45'	Report	Deminguet 34' (yellow card) 76'	Stadium: Stade Paul-Gasser; Attendance: 1,479; Referee: (France) Anthony Ustaritz

20 December 2024 Round of 64	Troyes	3-0	Metz	Troyes
20:45 CET	Ripart 27' 84'; Cyriaque Kalou Bi Irié 70'; Monfray (yellow card) 77'	Report	Sané (yellow card) 17'	Stadium: Stade de l'Aube; Attendance: 4,479; Referee: (France) Clément Turpin
