= Mamadou Koné =

Mamadou Koné is a name. People with that name include:

- Mamadou Koné (footballer, born 1991), Ivorian footballer
- Mamadou Koné (footballer, born 1974), Burkinabe footballer
- Mamadou Koné (footballer, born 2006), Ivorian footballer
