= Boiteau =

Boiteau is a surname. Notable people with the surname include:

- Arnaud Boiteau (born 1973), French equestrian
- Luka Boiteau (born 2006), Canadian footballer
- Pierre Boiteau (1911–1980), French botanist
