= 2026–27 FC Metz season =

FC Metz
2026–27 season
- Manager: Luc Holtz
- Stadium: Stade Saint-Symphorien
- Ligue 2: Pre-season
- Coupe de France: Pre-season

== Transfers ==
=== In ===
Pos.	Player	Transferred from	Fee	Date	Source
MF	(Cameroon) Morgan Bokele	(France) Dunkerque	Loan return	30 June 2026	
MF	(France) Joseph Nduquidi	(France) Amiens SC	Loan return	30 June 2026	

=== Out ===
Pos.	Player	Transferred to	Fee	Date	Source
MF	(Mali) Boubacar Traoré	(England) Wolverhampton Wanderers	Loan return	30 June 2026	
MF	(Georgia (country)) Giorgi Tsitaishvili	(Ukraine) Dynamo Kyiv	Loan return	30 June 2026	
FW	(Georgia (country)) Giorgi Kvilitaia	(Germany) Holstein Kiel		1 July 2026	
MF	(France) Benjamin Stambouli			1 July 2026	
DF	(Senegal) Fodé Ballo-Touré			1 July 2026	
DF	(Algeria) Kevin Van Den Kerkhof	(Belgium) Charleroi	Loan made permanent	1 July 2026	
MF	(France) Joseph Nduquidi	(Portugal) Farense	Undisclosed	7 July 2026	
DF	(Senegal) Sadibou Sané	AS Monaco	Undisclosed	7 July 2026	

== Pre-season ==
3 July 2026 Friendly	Metz (France)	5–2	(Luxembourg) US Mondorf-les-Bains
18:30	23'; 70'; 76'; 87'; 90+2'		32'; 74'

4 July 2026 Friendly	Metz (France)	1–2	(Luxembourg) FC Differdange 03
16:00	Diallo 87'		63'; 85'

25 July 2026 Friendly	Metz (France)	3–1	(Netherlands) Fortuna Sittard
14:00

== Competitions ==
=== Ligue 2 ===
Pos	Team	Pld	W	D	L	GF	GA	GD	Pts	Promotion or Relegation
5	Pau	12	6	2	4	16	13	+3	20	Qualification for promotion play-off quarter-final
6	Dijon	12	5	3	4	21	19	+2	18	
7	Metz	12	4	5	3	20	19	+1	17	
8	Red Star	12	5	2	5	14	17	−3	17	
9	Annecy	12	5	1	6	14	18	−4	16	

Updated to match(es) played on 7 November 2026. Source: Ligue 2
Rules for classification: 1) Points; 2) Goal difference; 3) Number of goals scored; 4) Head-to-head goal difference; 5) Fair play points
