= Great Great Great Grandparents' Music =

1997 documentary film

- Directed by: Taale Laafi Rosellini
- Produced by: Taale Laafi Rosellini
- Distributed by: African Family Films
- Release date: 1996
- Running time: 90-105 minutes
- Countries: Burkina Faso; United States

Great Great Great Grandparents' Music is an American documentary film directed, produced, and filmed by Taale Laafi Rosellini. Filmed over approximately two decades in Ouagadougou, Burkina Faso, the documentary portrays three generations of the Koné family and their Griot (Jeli ) musical and oral-history tradition.

== Synopsis ==
The film documents how music, storytelling, oral history, instrument making, family knowledge, and cultural values are passed from elders to children and features the Jula, Bamana, Bwamu, Mooré, and French languages with English subtitles.

Members of the extended Koné family appear throughout the documentary. They include Wamian Koné, an elder musician who plays the bala for his grandchildren and other children, and Dougoutigui Koné, identified in the film's as Dugutigi Koné. The film shows Dougoutigui Koné teaching his young son, Dramane Koné, to play the balafon, and Salifou Djibamy Koné playing the balafon at age two. Other family members shown in the film include Kiemogo Koné, Kalifa Koné, and Bureima Koné. The documentary also features other relatives, neighbors, musicians, singers, dancers, and children from the community.

== Release ==
The film was completed in 1996 and distributed by African Family Films. Different releases of the film vary in length between 90 and 105 minutes.

It was shown and honored at the 1997 Panafrican Film and Television Festival of Ouagadougou. The award was presented by Senegalese filmmaker Ousmane Sembène, who served as jury president. The film later screened at the Pan African Film Festival in Los Angeles, where it was nominated for Best Documentary.
