= Sohaib Naïr =

Footballer (born 2002)

Personal information
- Date of birth: 23 April 2002 (age 24)
- Place of birth: Saint-Denis, France
- Height: 1.86 m (6 ft 1 in)
- Position: Centre-back

Team information
- Current team: Saint-Étienne
- Number: 18

Youth career
- 2018–2019: FC Montfermeil
- 2019–2021: Toulouse

Senior career*
Years	Team	Apps	(Gls)
2019–2022	Toulouse B	14	(0)
2022–2024	Guingamp B	42	(2)
2024–2026	Guingamp	45	(2)
2026–	Saint-Étienne	0	(0)

International career^{‡}
2026–	Algeria	1	(0)
- * Club domestic league appearances and goals as of 11 May 2026 ‡ National team caps and goals as of 6 October 2026

Sohaib Naïr (Arabic: صهيب ناير; born 23 April 2002) is a professional footballer who plays as a centre-back for Ligue 2 club Saint-Étienne. Born in France, he represents the Algeria national team.

== Club career ==
Naïr came through Toulouse before joining Guingamp in 2022, where he signed his first professional contract, a deal until 2025. By the 2023–24 season, he had become the captain of the club's reserve team and integrated the first team for training sessions. On 23 August 2024, Naïr made his Ligue 2 and professional debut in a match against Laval. By January 2025, he had established himself as a regular in Guingamp's back line. He signed a contract extension until 2027 on 18 February 2025. On 7 March 2025, Naïr scored his first professional goal in a 3–1 win over Clermont.

On 1 July 2026, Naïr moved to Saint-Étienne in Ligue 2 on a four-year deal.

== International career ==
On 17 March 2025, following Ismaël Bennacer's withdrawal due to injury, Algeria national team coach Vladimir Petković called Naïr up for two 2026 FIFA World Cup qualification matches against Botswana and Mozambique.

Naïr made his debut for Algeria on 6 October 2026 in friendly against Niger.

== Personal life ==
Born in Saint-Denis, France, Naïr is of Algerian descent.
