= Gabin Capuano =

French footballer (born 2006

Personal information
- Date of birth: 26 April 2006 (age 20)
- Place of birth: Aubenas, France
- Height: 1.85 m (6 ft 1 in)
- Position: Forward

Team information
- Current team: Quevilly-Rouen (on loan from Lens)
- Number: 20

Youth career
- –2023: Olympique de Valence

Senior career*
Years	Team	Apps	(Gls)
2023–2024	Olympique de Valence	25	(8)
2024–	Lens B	20	(12)
2025–	Lens	1	(0)
2025–2026	→ Boulogne (loan)	14	(1)
2026–	→ Quevilly-Rouen (loan)	3	(0)
- * Club domestic league appearances and goals as of 5 September 2026

Gabin Capuano (born 26 April 2006) is a French professional footballer who plays as a forward for Ligue 3 club Quevilly-Rouen on loan from Lens.

== Early life ==
Capuano was born on 26 April 2006. Born in Aubenas, France, he is a native of the city.

== Career ==
As a youth player, Capuano joined the youth academy of Olympique de Valence and was promoted to the club's senior team in 2023, where he made twenty-five league appearances and scored eight goals. On 26 August 2023, he debuted for them during a 0–1 away loss to FC Limonest Dardilly Saint-Didier in the league.

In 2024, he signed for the reserve team of Ligue 1 side Lens, where he scored eight goals in his first eleven appearances. Six months later, he was promoted to the club's senior team. On 5 January 2025, he debuted for them during a 0–1 home loss to Toulouse FC in the league.

On 1 September 2025, Capuano signed his first professional contract with Lens for three seasons, and was loaned to Boulogne for the 2025–26 season.

== Style of play ==
Capuano plays as a forward and is two-footed. German news website OneFootball wrote in 2025 that he is "an intelligent, selfless, and cool-headed player in front of goal".

== Career statistics ==
As of match played 10 May 2026

Appearances and goals by club, season and competition
Club	Season	League			Cup		Europe		Other		Total	
Club	Season	Division	Apps	Goals	Apps	Goals	Apps	Goals	Apps	Goals	Apps	Goals
Olympique de Valence	2023–24	CFA 2	25	8	—		—		—		25	8
Lens B	2024–25	CFA	20	12	—		—		—		20	12
Lens	2024–25	Ligue 1	1	0	—		—		—		1	0
Lens	2026–27	Ligue 1	0	0	0	0	0	0	0	0	0	0
Lens	Total		1	0	0	0	0	0	0	0	1	0
Boulogne (loan)	2025–26	Ligue 2	14	1	0	0	—		—		14	1
Career total			60	21	0	0	0	0	0	0	60	21
