= Ibou Sané =

Senegalese footballer (born 2005)

Personal information
- Date of birth: 28 March 2005 (age 21)
- Place of birth: Diégoune, Senegal
- Height: 1.80 m (5 ft 11 in)
- Position: Forward

Team information
- Current team: Metz

Youth career
- Génération Foot

Senior career*
| Years | Team | Apps | (Gls) |
| –2023 | Génération Foot | | |
| 2023– | Metz | 47 | (4) |
| 2023– | Metz B | 17 | (13) |
| 2026 | → Amiens (loan) | 9 | (2) |

International career^{‡}
| 2023 | Senegal U20 | 2 | (1) |
- * Club domestic league appearances and goals as of 12 May 2026 ‡ National team caps and goals as of 20:11, 17 December 2023 (UTC)

Ibou Sané (born 28 March 2005) is a Senegalese professional footballer who plays as a forward for French Ligue 2 club Metz.

== Club career ==
On 22 July 2023, Sané signed for French Ligue 1 club Metz on a five-year contract. He had been expected to leave Génération Foot for Metz two years prior, but a knee injury in November 2021 had postponed his transfer.

On 2 February 2026, Sané moved on loan to Amiens in Ligue 2 until the end of the 2025–26 season.

== International career ==
Sané is a Senegal youth international. He won the 2023 U-20 Africa Cup of Nations, making two appearances and scoring one goal in the competition.

== Career statistics ==
As of match played 13 March 2026

Appearances and goals by club, season and competition
| Club | Season | League | | | Cup | | Other | | Total | |
| Club | Season | Division | Apps | Goals | Apps | Goals | Apps | Goals | Apps | Goals |
|---|---|---|---|---|---|---|---|---|---|---|
| Metz | 2023–24 | Ligue 1 | 9 | 1 | 1 | 0 | 1 (Note: Ligue 1 relegation/promotion play-offs) | 0 | 11 | 1 |
| Metz | 2024–25 | Ligue 2 | 22 | 2 | 2 | 1 | 0 | 0 | 24 | 3 |
| Metz | 2025–26 | Ligue 1 | 16 | 1 | 1 | 0 | 0 | 0 | 17 | 1 |
| Metz | Total | | 47 | 4 | 4 | 1 | 1 | 0 | 52 | 5 |
| Metz B | 2023–24 | National 3 | 10 | 13 | — | | — | | 10 | 13 |
| Metz B | 2024–25 | National 3 | 5 | 0 | — | | — | | 5 | 0 |
| Metz B | 2025–26 | National 3 | 2 | 0 | — | | — | | 2 | 0 |
| Metz B | Total | | 17 | 13 | — | | — | | 17 | 13 |
| Amiens (loan) | 2025–26 | Ligue 2 | 5 | 1 | 0 | 0 | — | | 5 | 1 |
| Career total | | | 69 | 18 | 4 | 1 | 1 | 0 | 74 | 19 |

== Honours ==
Génération Foot

- Ligue 1: 2022–23

Senegal U20

- U-20 Africa Cup of Nations: 2023
