= Dramane Koné =

Burkina Faso musician

Dramane Koné (surname also spelled Koné) is a master drummer and griot from Burkina Faso. He is best known for his appearance (studying balafon at age 4) in the Taali Laafi Rosselini documentary film Great Great Great Grandparents Music which featured vignettes of Dramane Kone's griot family life in west Africa. He specializes in the goblet-shaped hand drum called djembe. He is a member of the Dioula ethnic group.

Koné began a musical group, Ballet Djelia Kadi, in 2001.

== Early life ==
Dramane Kone was born in the capital city of Ouagadougou, in central Burkina Faso. He began studying music at the age of three under Dougoutigui Kone, elder djembefola (master djembe player) of Ouagadougou. Koné was educated in the ancient drumming traditions of west Africa, and was initiated into the history and music of the Manding (also spelled Mandingue) people. His later musical education included private studies with a number of village elders, masters and griots.

His father is the musical griot/master drummer Dougoutigui Koné. After their appearances in the Rosselini film, his father moved the family to and from Mali, west Africa.

== Career ==
Koné won national contests starting in 1996. The Rosselini film was released in 1997, and in 1998 Dramane went on to perform as djembefola (djembe drummer) with the National Ballet of Burkina Faso (he also plays Dunun, Balafon and Ngoni) accompanying dancers in the ballet and was then promoted to lead djembefola in the NBBF before migrating to the U.S. in 1999.

Koné traveled widely in western Europe in 1997-1998. In November 2009, he taught a public masterclass on djembe and dunun at the Toronto Centre for the Arts sponsored by the Burkina Faso consulate and a private association of Burkina Faso. He performed with Djelia Kadi in Los Angeles California.

He is also the brother of griot and master drummer Mamadou Koné (d. 2012), and the two Koné brothers and their father played together in various traditional and popular music ensembles in Burkina Faso and elsewhere.

Koné moved to the United States in 1999. He resides in Santa Monica, California.

== See also ==
- Djembe
