= Mamadou Koné (footballer, born 2006) =

Ivorian footballer (born 2006)

Personal information
- Date of birth: 20 November 2006 (age 19)
- Place of birth: Abidjan, Ivory Coast
- Position: Centre-forward

Team information
- Current team: Lorient
- Number: 42

Youth career
- Ivoire Académie
- Académie Africa Foot
- 2025–2026: Lorient

Senior career*
Years	Team	Apps	(Gls)
2025–2026	Lorient B	24	(9)
2026–	Lorient	6	(1)

International career^{‡}
- Ivory Coast U20
- * Club domestic league appearances and goals as of 15 October 2026 ‡ National team caps and goals as of 15 October 2026

Mamadou Koné (born 20 November 2006) is an Ivorian professional footballer who plays as a forward for Lorient.

== Club career ==
Koné grew up in Williamsville, Abidjan, where he first played for Real de Côte d'Ivoire and the Ivoire Académie before joining the Bamako based Malian Barcelona partner Académie Africa Foot.

In the summer 2025, he signed for Ligue 1 French side FC Lorient.

During the 2025–26 season, he first played with the Championnat National 2 reserve.

Koné made his professional debut with Lorient as a substitute in a 7–0 away Coupe de France win over AS Gosier on 20 December 2025, scoring his first goal in the same competition in the following leg, a 3–1 away win to Hauts Lyonnais.

After impressing in pre-season with Alexandre Dujeux's first team, Koné made his Ligue 1 debut with Lorient on 22 August 2026, starting in a 0–0 draw with OGC Nice, soon becoming a regular offensive threat with the first team.

He scored his first goal less than two weeks later, the only score of a 1–0 Ligue 1 away win to recent vice-champions RC Lens.

== International career ==
Koné is a youth international for Ivory Coast, having played for the under-20.
