= Sadibou Sané =

Senegalese footballer (born 2004)

Personal information
- Date of birth: 10 June 2004 (age 22)
- Place of birth: Diouloulou, Senegal
- Height: 1.85 m (6 ft 1 in)
- Position: Defender

Team information
- Current team: Monaco
- Number: 72

Youth career
- Génération Foot

Senior career*
Years	Team	Apps	(Gls)
–2023	Génération Foot		
2023–2026	Metz	61	(2)
2023	Metz B	1	(0)
2026–	Monaco	7	(0)

International career^{‡}
2026–	Senegal	4	(0)
- * Club domestic league appearances and goals as of 18 October 2026 ‡ National team caps and goals as of 16 November 2026

Sadibou Sané (born 10 June 2004) is a Senegalese professional footballer who plays as a defender for Ligue 1 club Monaco and the Senegal national team.

== Club career ==
Sané won the 2022–23 Ligue 1 with Senegalese club Génération Foot. On 22 July 2023, he signed for French club Metz on a five-year contract. He made his league debut in a 2–2 draw against Reims on 3 September 2023.

On 8 July 2026, Sané signed a five-year contract with Monaco.

== International career ==
Sané is a Senegal youth international. He was part of the squad that won the 2023 U-20 Africa Cup of Nations, but did not participate in a match.

Sané was one of the players who were called up with the Senegal national team by head coach Patrick Vieira for the 2027 Africa Cup of Nations qualification matches against Mozambique and Ethiopia on 25 and 29 September 2026, respectively; and the friendly match against Comoros on 4 October 2026.

== Career statistics ==
=== Club ===
As of match played 18 October 2026

Appearances and goals by club, season and competition
Club	Season	League			Cup (Note: Includes Coupe de France)		Europe		Other		Total	
Club	Season	Division	Apps	Goals	Apps	Goals	Apps	Goals	Apps	Goals	Apps	Goals
Metz	2023–24	Ligue 1	14	0	1	1	—		2 (Note: Appearances in Ligue 1 relegation/promotion play-offs)	0	17	1
Metz	2024–25	Ligue 2	25	0	2	1	—		3	0	30	1
Metz	2025–26	Ligue 1	22	2	1	1	—		0	0	23	3
Metz	Total		61	2	4	3	—		5	0	70	5
Metz B	2023–24	National 3	1	0	—		—		—		1	0
Monaco	2026–27	Ligue 1	7	0	0	0	3 (Note: Appearances in UEFA Conference League)	0	—		10	0
Career total			69	2	4	3	3	0	5	0	81	5

=== International ===
As of match played 16 November 2026

Appearances and goals by national team and year
National team	Year	Apps	Goals
Senegal	2026	4	0
Total		4	0

== Honours ==
Génération Foot

- Ligue 1: 2022–23

Senegal U20

- U-20 Africa Cup of Nations: 2023
