= Milan Robin =

French footballer

Personal information
- Full name: Milan Robin
- Date of birth: November 24, 1999 (age 26)
- Place of birth: Épinal, France
- Height: 1.86 m (6 ft 1 in)
- Position: Midfielder

Team information
- Current team: Estoril Praia

Youth career
- 2005–2012: FC Eloyes
- 2012–2014: Épinal
- 2016–2018: Metz

Senior career*
Years	Team	Apps	(Gls)
2016–2021	Metz II	24	(7)
2021–2023	Cholet	49	(4)
2023–2025	Martigues	64	(6)
2025–2026	Le Mans	28	(1)
2026–	Estoril Praia	0	(0)

International career^{‡}
2014–2015	France U16	5	(0)
- * Club domestic league appearances and goals as of 15:14, 21 July 2026 (UTC) ‡ National team caps and goals as of 15:14, 21 July 2026 (UTC)

Milan Robin (born 24 November 1999) is a French footballer who plays as a central midfielder for Liga Portugal club Estoril Praia.

== Club career ==
Robin is a product of the youth academies of the French clubs FC Eloyes, Épinal and Metz. He was first promoted to Metz's reserves in 2016, and on 15 July 2020 signed his first professional contract with the club. On 30 May 2021, he transferred to Cholet in the Championnat National. Originally a winger, Robin suffered an injury in his first season at Cholet and was repositioned to midfielder. On 31 July 2023, he moved to Martigues. In his second season, he played a crucial role including the game-winning goal that promoted Martigues to Ligue 2. On 23 June 2025, he transferred to newly promoted Ligue 2 side Le Mans FC. He helped Le Mans earn promotion to Ligue 1 for the 2026–27 season.

Robin announce official left for the Le Mans after one year.

On 4 September 2026, Robin abroad to Portugal for the first time and announce official transfer to Liga Portugal club, Estoril Praia for during 2026–27 season.

== International career ==
Robin played for the France U16s for a set of friendlies in 2014 and 2015.
