= Tom Meynadier =

French footballer (born 2000)

Personal information
- Date of birth: 27 January 2000 (age 26)
- Place of birth: France
- Height: 1.76 m (5 ft 9 in)
- Position: Right-back

Youth career
- 2006–2018: Roanne

Senior career*
Years	Team	Apps	(Gls)
2018–2020	Roanne		
2020–2022	Feurs		
2022–2024	GOAL FC	36	(0)
2024–2026	Bastia	68	(0)
- * Club domestic league appearances and goals as of 27 August 2026

Tom Meynadier (born 27 January 2000) is a French professional footballer who plays as a right-back.

== Career ==
A product of the Roanne academy, Meynadier made his senior debuts in the 2018–19 season in the Régional 2. In 2020, he signed for Régional 1 club Feurs, where he would contribute to the club's promotion to the Championnat National 3 in his second and final season. In the 2022–23 season, Meynadier made his debut in the Championnat National with GOAL FC. On 1 February 2024, he joined Ligue 2 club Bastia in a permanent transfer, signing a contract until the end of the 2025–26 season.

== Honours ==
Feurs

- Régional 1 Auvergne-Rhône-Alpes: 2021–22
