= Owen Kouassi =

Ivorian footballer

Personal information
- Full name: Christ-Owen Kouassi Bathele
- Date of birth: 15 April 2003 (age 23)
- Place of birth: Paris, France
- Height: 1.84 m (6 ft 0 in)
- Position: Centre-back

Team information
- Current team: Grenoble (on loan from Lecce)
- Number: 21

Youth career
- 2015–2016: ESD Montreuil
- 2016–2020: US Fontenay
- 2020–2024: Laval

Senior career*
Years	Team	Apps	(Gls)
2024–2025	Laval	33	(2)
2025–	Lecce	4	(0)
2026	→ Laval (loan)	11	(1)
2026–	→ Grenoble (loan)	0	(0)

International career^{‡}
2025	Ivory Coast U23	1	(0)
- * Club domestic league appearances and goals as of 4 September 2026 ‡ National team caps and goals as of 13:23, 10 June 2025 (UTC)

Christ-Owen Kouassi Bathele (born 15 April 2003) is a professional footballer who plays as a centre-back for Ligue 2 club Grenoble on loan from Serie A club Lecce. Born in France, he is a youth international for the Ivory Coast.

== Club career ==
=== Laval ===
Kouassi is a product of the youth academies of ESD Montreuil, US Fontenay, and Laval. On 30 June 2024, he signed his first professional contract with Laval until 2027. He made his senior and professional debut with Laval in a 2–1 Ligue 2 loss to Grenoble on 16 August 2024.

=== Lecce ===
On 29 June 2025, Kouassi signed a four-year contract with Serie A club Lecce.

On 1 February 2026, Kouassi returned to Laval on loan until the end of the 2025–26 season.

== International career ==
Born in France, Kouassi is of Ivorian descent. On 27 May 2025, he was called up to the Ivory Coast U23s for a friendly. He debuted with the Ivory Coast U23s in a friendly 3–0 loss to the Netherlands U23s on 6 June 2025.
