= Lanroy Machine =

French footballer (born 2005)

Personal information
- Date of birth: 13 October 2005 (age 21)
- Place of birth: Saint-Laurent-du-Maroni, French Guiana, France
- Height: 1.83 m (6 ft 0 in)
- Position: Forward

Team information
- Current team: Heerenveen (on loan from Angers)
- Number: 29

Youth career
- –2014: CO Metz Bellecroix
- 2014–2024: Metz

Senior career*
| Years | Team | Apps | (Gls) |
| 2023–2024 | Metz B | 19 | (0) |
| 2024– | Angers B | 28 | (8) |
| 2025– | Angers | 24 | (1) |
| 2026– | → Heerenveen (loan) | 0 | (0) |
- * Club domestic league appearances and goals as of 20 May 2026

Lanroy Machine (born 13 October 2005) is a French professional footballer who plays as a forward for Eredivisie club Heerenveen, on loan from Ligue 1 club Angers.

== Career ==
Machine grew up in the Bellecroix neighborhood of Metz before joining the youth academy of the local professional club FC Metz at the age of 9. In 2024, he signed for the reserve team of Angers after contractual disagreements with Metz. In 2025, he made his professional debut for Angers, making two appearances in the second half of the 2024–25 Ligue 1 season. He participated in the first team's preparation ahead of the 2025–26 campaign, and eventually made substitute appearances against Paris FC and Paris Saint-Germain in the first two matches of the season.

On 27 July 2026, Machine was loaned by Heerenveen in the Netherlands, with an option to buy.

== Style of play ==
Machine has been described as a versatile forward.
