= Luka Boiteau =

Canadian soccer player (born 2006)

Personal information
- Date of birth: 2 January 2006 (age 20)
- Place of birth: Sèvres, France
- Height: 1.74 m (5 ft 9 in)
- Position: Attacking midfielder

Team information
- Current team: Valenciennes
- Number: 26

Youth career
- FC Lambersart
- LOSC Lille
- Boulogne

Senior career*
Years	Team	Apps	(Gls)
2025–2026	Boulogne	9	(1)
2026–	Valenciennes	4	(0)
- * Club domestic league appearances and goals as of 3 September 2026

Luka Boiteau (born 2 January 2006) is a professional footballer who plays as an attacking midfielder for Ligue 3 club Valenciennes. Born in France, he has been called up to represent Canada internationally.

== Club career ==
Boiteau is a product of the youth academies of the French clubs FC Lambersart, LOSC Lille and Boulogne. In the 2024–25 season he had a strong year with Boulogne's reserves, and was heralded as one of the top amateur footballers in France for the season. He made his senior and professional debut with Boulougne in a 2–1 Ligue 2 loss to on 12 September 2025.

On 2 July 2026, Boiteau signed a two-year contract, with an optional third year, with Ligue 3 club Valenciennes.

== International career ==
In October 2022, he was called up to a training camp for the Canada U17s.
