= Bahmed Deuff =

Mauritanian footballer (born 2006)

Personal information
- Date of birth: 10 March 2006 (age 20)
- Place of birth: Nouakchott, Mauritania
- Height: 1.94 m (6 ft 4 in)
- Position: Midfielder

Team information
- Current team: Antwerp (on loan from Nantes)
- Number: 6

Youth career
- 2014–2024: Nantes

Senior career*
Years	Team	Apps	(Gls)
2024–	Nantes B	24	(3)
2025–	Nantes	14	(0)
2026–	→ Antwerp (loan)	0	(0)

International career^{‡}
2026–	Mauritania	1	(0)
- * Club domestic league appearances and goals as of 22 April 2026 (UTC) ‡ National team caps and goals as of 01:49, 8 June 2026 (UTC)

Bahmed Deuff (born 10 March 2006) is a Mauritanian professional footballer who plays as a midfielder for Belgian Pro League club Antwerp on loan from French club Nantes, and the Mauritania national team.

== Career ==
On 9 July 2025, prior to Nantes's summer training camp ahead of the 2025–26 Ligue 1 season, Deuff signed his first professional contract with the club, being simultaneously promoted to their first team. Despite taking part in most of the pre-season matches, he began the season with their reserve side. On 4 October 2025, during his second call-up to the senior squad, manager Luís Castro handed him his debut, bringing him on six minutes from the end of a 0–0 draw against Brest.

On 3 September 2026, Deuff joined Antwerp in Belgium on loan with an option to buy.

== International career ==
Deuff was born in Mauritania to Senegalese parents, and moved to France at a young age. He was called up to the Mauritania national team for a set of friendlies in June 2026.

== Career statistics ==
As of match played 22 April 2026

Appearances and goals by club, season and competition
Club	Season	League			National cup		Europe		Other		Total	
Club	Season	Division	Apps	Goals	Apps	Goals	Apps	Goals	Apps	Goals	Apps	Goals
Nantes B	2024–25	National 3	13	1	—		—		—		13	1
Nantes B	2025–26	National 3	11	2	—		—		—		11	2
Nantes B	Total		24	3	—		—		—		24	3
Nantes	2025–26	Ligue 1	11	0	2	1	—		—		13	1
Career total			35	3	2	1	0	0	0	0	37	4
