= 2018–19 Amiens SC season =

Amiens
2018–19 season
- Chairman: Bernard Joannin
- Manager: Christophe Pélissier
- Stadium: Stade de la Licorne
- Ligue 1: 15th
- Coupe de France: Round of 32
- Coupe de la Ligue: Round of 16
- Top goalscorer: League: Moussa Konaté (7); All: Moussa Konaté (7)
- Highest home attendance: League/All: 11,932 (25 Nov (Marseille), 12 Jan (PSG) and 24 May (Guingamp))
- Lowest home attendance: League: 7,605 (26 September vs.Rennes); All: 4,158 (5 January vs.Valenciennes (CdF))
- Average home league attendance: 10,895
- Biggest win: 4–1 v. Reims (25 August 2018)
- Biggest defeat: 0–5 at Paris Saint-Germain (20 October 2018)
Home colours	Away colours	Third colours

The 2018–19 Amiens SC season was the 117th professional season of the club since its creation in 1901, and the club's 2nd consecutive season in the top flight of French football. It covered a period from 1 July 2018 to 30 June 2019. They participated in the Ligue 1, the Coupe de France and Coupe de la Ligue.

== Players ==
Note: Flags indicate national team as defined under FIFA eligibility rules; some limited exceptions apply. Players may hold more than one non-FIFA nationality.

No.	Pos.	Nation	Player
1	GK	FRA	Régis Gurtner (vice-captain)
2	DF	FRA	Prince-Désir Gouano (3rd captain)
3	DF	BEN	Khaled Adénon
4	DF	SWE	Emil Krafth (on loan from Bologna)
5	MF	FRA	Eddy Gnahoré (on loan from Palermo)
6	MF	FRA	Thomas Monconduit (captain)
7	FW	IRI	Saman Ghoddos
8	MF	BRA	Paulo Henrique Ganso (on loan from Sevilla)
10	MF	COL	Stiven Mendoza
11	FW	COL	Juan Ferney Otero
12	DF	MLI	Bakaye Dibassy
13	FW	FRA	Quentin Cornette
14	MF	FRA	Gaoussou Traoré
15	FW	SEN	Moussa Konaté
16	GK	FRA	Matthieu Dreyer

No.	Pos.	Nation	Player
17	MF	FRA	Alexis Blin (on loan from Toulouse)
19	DF	MAR	Oualid El Hajjam
20	MF	CIV	Cheick Timité
21	MF	POL	Rafał Kurzawa
24	MF	FRA	Mathieu Bodmer
25	DF	FRA	Jordan Lefort
29	FW	NIG	Seybou Koita
30	GK	FRA	Gauthier Banaziak
32	FW	FRA	Martin Gneba
34	MF	RSA	Bongani Zungu
35	DF	FRA	Valentin Gendrey
36	MF	CMR	Jean-Claude Ngando
37	DF	FRA	Sanasi Sy
38	MF	FRA	Réda Rabeï
40	GK	FRA	Antonin Gauducheau

=== Out on loan ===
Note: Flags indicate national team as defined under FIFA eligibility rules; some limited exceptions apply. Players may hold more than one non-FIFA nationality.

No. / Pos. / Nation / Player; — / FW / FRA / Brighton Labeau (on loan to Villefranche)	No. / Pos. / Nation / Player; — / FW / GLP / Yannick Mamilonne (on loan to Paris FC)

== Competitions ==
=== Ligue 1 ===
==== League table ====
Pos	Team	Pld	W	D	L	GF	GA	GD	Pts
13	Angers	38	10	16	12	44	49	−5	46
14	Bordeaux	38	10	11	17	34	42	−8	41
15	Amiens	38	9	11	18	31	52	−21	38
16	Toulouse	38	8	14	16	35	57	−22	38
17	Monaco	38	8	12	18	38	57	−19	36

Source: Ligue 1 and Soccerway
Rules for classification: 1) Points; 2) Goal difference; 3) Head-to-head points; 4) Head-to-head goal difference; 5) Head-to-head goals scored; 6) Head-to-head away goals scored; 7) Goals scored; 8) Away goals scored; 9) Most goals scored in single league match; 10) Fairplay ranking.

==== Results summary ====
Overall								Home						Away					
Pld	W	D	L	GF	GA	GD	Pts	W	D	L	GF	GA	GD	W	D	L	GF	GA	GD
38	9	11	18	31	52	−21	38	7	5	7	20	22	−2	2	6	11	11	30	−19

Last updated: 24 May 2019.
Source: Competitive matches

==== Results by round ====
Round	1	2	3	4	5	6	7	8	9	10	11	12	13	14	15	16	17	18	19	20	21	22	23	24	25	26	27	28	29	30	31	32	33	34	35	36	37	38
Ground	A	H	H	A	H	A	H	A	H	A	H	A	A	H	A	H	A	H	A	H	A	H	A	H	A	H	A	H	A	H	H	A	A	H	A	H	A	H
Result	L	L	W	D	L	L	W	L	W	L	L	L	W	L	L	L	W	D	D	L	L	L	L	W	L	W	D	W	D	D	D	D	L	D	D	D	L	W
Position	17	19	14	14	18	19	15	17	13	17	18	18	16	16	18	19	17	18	17	17	17	18	19	16	17	17	17	16	17	17	17	17	17	17	16	16	17	15

Source: Results
A = Away; H = Home; W = Win; D = Draw; L = Loss

==== Matches ====
Win Draw Loss

12 August 2018 1	Lyon	2–0	Amiens	Décines-Charpieu
15:00 CEST (UTC+02:00)	B. Traoré 24'; Depay 75'	Report	G. Traoré (yellow card) 42'; Gnahoré (yellow card) 84'	Stadium: Parc Olympique Lyonnais; Attendance: 48,263; Referee: Frank Schneider

18 August 2018 2	Amiens	1–2	Montpellier	Amiens
20:00 CEST (UTC+2)	Fofana (yellow card) 33'; Konaté 82' (pen.)	Report	Mollet 52'; Aguilar (yellow card) 64'; Delort (yellow card) 66'; Skhiri 71'; Lasne (yellow card) 79'	Stadium: Stade de la Licorne; Attendance: 10,397; Referee: Karim Abed

25 August 2018 3	Amiens	4–1	Reims	Amiens
20:00 CEST (UTC+2)	Gnahoré 22'; Zungu (yellow card) 45'; Ghoddos 58'; Konaté 67', 73'	Report	Martin (yellow card) 10'; Métanire (red card) 36'; Cafaro 84'	Stadium: Stade de la Licorne; Attendance: 10,709; Referee: Florent Batta

2 September 2018 4	Saint-Étienne	0–0	Amiens	Saint-Étienne
15:00 CEST (UTC+2)	Salibur (yellow card) 36'; Khazri (yellow card) 58'; Selnæs (yellow card) 70'	Report	Zungu (yellow card) 33'; Monconduit (yellow card) 63'	Stadium: Stade Geoffroy-Guichard; Attendance: 30,146; Referee: Thomas Leonard

15 September 2018 5	Amiens	2–3	Lille	Amiens
20:00 CEST (UTC+02:00)	Dibassy (yellow card) 54'; Kurzawa 79'; Ghoddos 90+3'	Report	Pépé 45+2' (pen.), 56' (pen.), 76'; Ikoné (yellow card) 49'; J. Fonte (yellow card) 85'	Stadium: Stade de la Licorne; Attendance: 11,569; Referee: Nicolas Rainville

22 September 2018 6	Strasbourg	3–1	Amiens	Strasbourg
20:00 CEST (UTC+02:00)	Lala 48'; Corgnet (yellow card) 63'; Corgnet 66'; Adénon 86' (o.g.)	Report	Ghoddos (yellow card) 28'; Krafth 45+2', (yellow card) 82'; Adénon (yellow card) 47'; Monconduit (yellow card) 71'	Stadium: Stade de la Meinau; Attendance: 24,683; Referee: Jérémy Stinat

26 September 2018 7	Amiens	2–1	Rennes	Amiens
19:00	Gnahoré 51'; Gouano 66'	Report	Gelin (yellow card) 17', (red card) 61'; Bensebaini (yellow card) 39'; Grenier 81'	Stadium: Stade de la Licorne; Attendance: 7,605; Referee: Johan Hamel

29 September 2018 8	Caen	1–0	Amiens	Caen
20:00 CEST (UTC+2)	Ninga 40' (pen.); Fajr (yellow card) 48'; Crivelli (yellow card) 90+4'	Report	Gnahoré (yellow card) 28', (yellow card) 69' (red card)	Stadium: Stade Michel d'Ornano; Attendance: 15,007; Referee: Benoît Bastien

6 October 2018 9	Amiens	1–0	Dijon	Amiens
20:00	Ghoddos 39'	Report		Stadium: Stade de la Licorne; Attendance: 10,194; Referee: Florent Batta

20 October 2018 10	Paris Saint-Germain	5–0	Amiens	Paris
17:00 CEST (UTC+2)	Marquinhos 12'; Rabiot 42'; Draxler 80'; Mbappé 82'; Diaby 87'	Report		Stadium: Parc des Princes; Attendance: 47,497; Referee: Mikael Lesage

27 October 2018 11	Amiens	1–2	Nantes	Amiens
20:00 CEST (UTC+2)	Adénon (yellow card) 36'; Bodmer 81'	Report	Boschilia 16', (yellow card) 30'; Kwateng (yellow card) 20'; Sala 71'	Stadium: Stade de la Licorne; Attendance: 11,384; Referee: Jérémy Stinat

3 November 2018 12	Nice	1–0	Amiens	Nice
20:00 CEST (UTC+02:00)	Gouano 38' (o.g.); Dante (yellow card) 44'	Report		Stadium: Allianz Riviera; Attendance: 15,259; Referee: Johan Hamel

10 November 2018 13	Toulouse	0–1	Amiens	Toulouse
20:00 CET (UTC+1)	Sidibé (yellow card) 45'; Gradel (yellow card) 80'; Cahuzac (yellow card) 90'	Report	Blin 28'; Adénon (yellow card) 31'	Stadium: Stadium Municipal; Attendance: 13,552; Referee: Eric Wattellier

25 November 2018 14	Amiens	1–3	Marseille	Amiens
21:00 CET (UTC+01:00)	Dibassy 8'; Monconduit (yellow card) 49'; Lefort (yellow card) 83'	Report	Rolando (yellow card) 14'; Thauvin 26', 80', 90+1'; Ocampos (yellow card) 72'; Sarr (yellow card) 72'	Stadium: Stade de la Licorne; Attendance: 11,932; Referee: Jérôme Miguelgorry

1 December 2018 15	Nîmes	3–0	Amiens	Nîmes
20:00 CET (UTC+01:00)	Bouanga 45'; Alioui 76', 87'; Ripart (yellow card) 81'	Report	Mendoza (yellow card) 6'; Dibassy (yellow card) 22'; Adénon (yellow card) 62'; Ghoddos (yellow card) 84'	Stadium: Stade des Costières; Attendance: 12,159; Referee: Karim Abed

4 December 2018 16	Amiens	0–2	Monaco	Amiens
19:00 CET (UTC+1)	Monconduit (yellow card) 54'; Adénon (yellow card) 90'; Dibassy (red card) 90+3'	Report	Falcao 43' (pen.), 90+6' (pen.); Tielemans (yellow card) 60'; Aït Bennasser (yellow card) 86'	Stadium: Stade de la Licorne; Attendance: 11,048; Referee: Jérôme Brisard

8 December 2018 17	Guingamp	1–2	Amiens	Guingamp
20:00 CET (UTC+1)	Didot (yellow card) 31', (goal) 70'; Thuram (red card) 90+5'	Report	Gouano (yellow card) 56'; Gnahoré 63'; Mendoza 81', (yellow card) 84'; El Hajjam (yellow card) 90+2'; Gurtner (yellow card) 90+4'	Stadium: Stade de Roudourou; Attendance: 14,089; Referee: Benoît Bastien

15 December 2018 18	Amiens	Postponed	Angers	Amiens
				Stadium: Stade de la Licorne

23 December 2018 19	Bordeaux	1–1	Amiens	Bordeaux
17:00 CET (UTC+1)	Kalu 22'	Report	Bodmer (yellow card) 5'; Timité (yellow card) 36'; Gnahoré 87'	Stadium: Matmut Atlantique; Attendance: 23,343; Referee: Mikael Lesage

8 January 2019 18	Amiens	0–0	Angers	Amiens
19:00 CET (UTC+1)		Report	Santamaria (yellow card) 40'	Stadium: Stade de la Licorne; Attendance: 10,209; Referee: Johan Hamel

12 January 2019 20	Amiens	0–3	Paris Saint-Germain	Amiens
17:00 CET (UTC+1)	Adénon (yellow card) 39' (yellow-red card) 66'; Blin (yellow card) 56'	Report	Cavani 57' (pen.); Mbappé 70'; Marquinhos 79'	Stadium: Stade de la Licorne; Attendance: 11,932; Referee: Florent Batta

18 January 2019 21	Lille	2–1	Amiens	Villeneuve-d'Ascq
20:45 CET (UTC+1)	Leão 45+2'; Xeka 85'	Report	Otero 5'; Gurtner (yellow card) 64'; Mendoza (yellow card) 90+2'; Lefort (yellow card) 90+3'	Stadium: Stade Pierre-Mauroy; Attendance: 27,211; Referee: Willy Delajod

27 January 2019 22	Amiens	0–1	Lyon	Amiens
17:00 CET (UTC+1)	Dibassy (yellow card) 86'	Report	Denayer 50'; Ndombele (yellow card) 73'; Dubois (yellow card) 76'; Dembélé (yellow card) 90+3'	Stadium: Stade de la Licorne; Attendance: 10,017; Referee: Jérôme Miguelgorry

2 February 2019 23	Rennes	1–0	Amiens	Rennes
20:00 CET (UTC+1)	Ben Arfa (yellow card) 79'; Zeffane 82'	Report	Blin (yellow card) 63'; Lefort (yellow card) 70'; Konaté (yellow card) 79'	Stadium: Roazhon Park; Attendance: 17,783; Referee: Olivier Thual

9 February 2019 24	Amiens	1–0	Caen	Amiens
20:00 CET (UTC+1)	Konaté 64'	Report		Stadium: Stade de la Licorne; Attendance: 9,373; Referee: Eric Wattellier

16 February 2019 25	Marseille	2–0	Amiens	Marseille
17:00 CET (UTC+1)	Thauvin 19'; Balotelli 25'; Amavi (yellow card) 49'	Report		Stadium: Stade Vélodrome; Attendance: 50,871; Referee: Johan Hamel

23 February 2019 26	Amiens	1–0	Nice	Amiens
20:00 CET (UTC+1)	Guirassy 11'	Report	Sarr (yellow card) 22'; Makengo (yellow card) 53'	Stadium: Stade de la Licorne; Attendance: 11,074; Referee: Thomas Leonard

2 March 2019 27	Reims	2–2	Amiens	Reims
20:00 CET (UTC+1)	Dia 70', (yellow card) 83'; Cafaro 84'	Report	Konaté 39' (pen.); Abdelhamid 44' (o.g.); Pieters (yellow card) 75'	Stadium: Stade Auguste Delaune; Attendance: 12,549; Referee: Frank Schneider

9 March 2019 28	Amiens	2–1	Nîmes	Amiens
20:00 CET (UTC+1)	Guirassy 49', (red card) 89'; Konaté (yellow card) 55'; Pieters 64'; Lefort (yellow card) 71'	Report	Alioui 53'; Landre (yellow card) 76'	Stadium: Stade de la Licorne; Attendance: 10,523; Referee: Willy Delajod

16 March 2019 29	Angers	0–0	Amiens	Angers
20:00 CET (UTC+1)	Bahoken (yellow card) 28'	Report	Monconduit (yellow card) 35'; Ghoddos (yellow card) 41'; Otero (yellow card) 55'; Krafth (yellow card) 55'	Stadium: Stade Raymond Kopa; Attendance: 10,427; Referee: Benoît Millot

31 March 2019 30	Amiens	0–0	Bordeaux	Amiens
15:00 CEST (UTC+2)	Blin (yellow card) 64'	Report	Jovanović (yellow card) 48'; Kamano (yellow card) 75'; De Préville (yellow card) 87'	Stadium: Stade de la Licorne; Attendance: 11,765; Referee: Mikael Lesage

6 April 2019 31	Amiens	2–2	Saint-Étienne	Amiens
20:00 CEST (UTC+2)	Konaté 24', 61'; Lefort (red card) 32'; Gurtner (yellow card) 90+5'; Gouano (yellow card) 90+5'	Report	Subotić (yellow card) 1'; Kolodziejczak 16', (yellow card) 57'; Cabella 90+5'	Stadium: Stade de la Licorne; Attendance: 11,832; Referee: Eric Wattellier

12 April 2019 32	Dijon	0–0	Amiens	Dijon
19:00 CEST (UTC+2)	Saïd (yellow card) 23'; Amalfitano (yellow card) 27'; Tavares (yellow card) 54'	Report	Gnahoré (yellow card) 31' (yellow-red card) 90+2'; Monconduit (yellow card) 53'	Stadium: Stade Gaston Gérard; Attendance: 12,532; Referee: Karim Abed

21 April 2019 33	Nantes	3–2	Amiens	Nantes
15:00 CEST (UTC+2)	Pallois (yellow card) 25'; Coulibaly 49', 55'; Rongier 59'; Touré (yellow card) 87'	Report	Pieters (yellow card) 4'; Otero 62'; Blin (yellow card) 69'; Mendoza (yellow card) 69'; Timité 77'	Stadium: Stade de la Beaujoire; Attendance: 19,253; Referee: Thomas Leonard

28 April 2019 34	Amiens	0–0	Strasbourg	Amiens
15:00 CEST (UTC+2)	Timité (yellow card) 83'	Report	Ajorque (yellow card) 14'; Sissoko (yellow card) 29'; Martin (yellow card) 85'	Stadium: Stade de la Licorne; Attendance: 11,833; Referee: Stéphanie Frappart

5 May 2019 35	Montpellier	1–1	Amiens	Montpellier
15:00 CEST (UTC+2)	Mollet 82'; Congré (yellow card) 90+5'	Report	Mendoza 66'; Gurtner (yellow card) 82'; Dibassy (yellow card) 90+1'	Stadium: Stade de la Mosson; Attendance: 14,330; Referee: Olivier Thual

11 May 2019 36	Amiens	0–0	Toulouse	Amiens
20:00 CEST (UTC+2)	Dibassy (yellow card) 57'; Ghoddos (yellow card) 78'	Report	Jullien (yellow card) 9'; Sidibé (yellow card) 24'; Durmaz (yellow card) 61'; Cahuzac (yellow card) 82'	Stadium: Stade de la Licorne; Attendance: 11,684; Referee: François Letexier

18 May 2019 37	Monaco	2–0	Amiens	Monaco
21:00 CEST (UTC+2)	Vinícius (yellow card) 22'; Falcao 26', (yellow card) 49'; Jemerson (yellow card) 44'; Golovin 82'; Silva (yellow card) 89'; Fàbregas (yellow card) 90+4'	Report	Adénon (yellow card) 22'; Gnahoré (yellow card) 45+1'	Stadium: Stade Louis II; Attendance: 10,188; Referee: Clément Turpin

24 May 2019 38	Amiens	2–1	Guingamp	Amiens
21:05 CEST (UTC+2)	Guirassy 14'; Ghoddos 47'	Report	Mendy 66'	Stadium: Stade de la Licorne; Attendance: 11,932; Referee: Amaury Delerue

=== Coupe de France ===
5 January 2019 Round of 64	Amiens	1–0	Valenciennes	Amiens
15:00 CET (UTC+1)	Blin (yellow card) 8'; Timité 48'	Report		Stadium: Stade de la Licorne; Attendance: 4,158; Referee: Benoît Millot

24 January 2019 Round of 32	Amiens	0–2	Lyon	Amiens
21:00 CET (UTC+1)	Adénon (yellow card) 20'; Sy (yellow card) 36'; Gnahoré (yellow card) 52'	Report	Dembélé 28'; Dubois 35'; Marçal (red card) 45+2'	Stadium: Stade de la Licorne; Attendance: 6,647; Referee: Jérôme Brisard

=== Coupe de la Ligue ===
31 October 2018 Round of 32	Metz	1–2	Amiens	Metz
21:05 CET (UTC+1)	Rivière 70'; Oukidja (yellow card) 82'; Fofana (yellow card) 90+5'	Report	Niane 5' (o.g.); Kurzawa (yellow card) 47'; Otero 72'; Ganso (yellow card) 90+3'	Stadium: Stade Saint-Symphorien; Attendance: 5,220; Referee: Nicolas Rainville

19 December 2018 Round of 16	Amiens	2–3	Lyon	Amiens
18:45 CET (UTC+1)	Adénon (yellow card) 19' (yellow-red card) 26'; Kurzawa (yellow card) 32'; Otero (yellow card) 39'; Denayer 70' (o.g.); Timité 90+1'; Blin (yellow card) 90+2'	Report	Dembélé 20' (pen.); Marçal (yellow card) 39'; Terrier (yellow card) 42', (goal) 60'; Traoré 45+2'	Stadium: Stade de la Licorne; Attendance: 7,327; Referee: Karim Abed

== Statistics ==
=== Appearances and goals ===
No.	Pos	Nat	Player	Total		Ligue 1		Coupe de France		Coupe de la Ligue	
No.	Pos	Nat	Player	Apps	Goals	Apps	Goals	Apps	Goals	Apps	Goals
Goalkeepers
1	GK	(France) FRA	Régis Gurtner	17	0	17	0	0	0	0	0
16	GK	(France) FRA	Matthieu Dreyer	2	0	0	0	0	0	2	0
30	GK	(France) FRA	Gauthier Banaziak	0	0	0	0	0	0	0	0
40	GK	(France) FRA	Antonin Gauducheau	0	0	0	0	0	0	0	0
Defenders
2	DF	(France) FRA	Prince-Désir Gouano	15	1	13	1	0	0	2	0
3	DF	(Benin) BEN	Khaled Adénon	16	0	15	0	0	0	1	0
4	DF	(Sweden) SWE	Emil Krafth	15	1	13+2	1	0	0	0	0
12	DF	(Mali) MLI	Bakaye Dibassy	18	1	16	1	0	0	1+1	0
19	DF	(Morocco) MAR	Oualid El Hajjam	11	0	5+4	0	0	0	2	0
25	DF	(France) FRA	Jordan Lefort	13	0	10+1	0	0	0	1+1	0
35	DF	(France) FRA	Valentin Gendrey	0	0	0	0	0	0	0	0
37	DF	(France) FRA	Sanasi Sy	1	0	0	0	0	0	1	0
Midfielders
5	MF	(France) FRA	Eddy Gnahoré	18	3	14+2	3	0	0	2	0
6	MF	(France) FRA	Thomas Monconduit	14	0	13	0	0	0	0+1	0
8	MF	(Brazil) BRA	Paulo Henrique Ganso	13	0	5+7	0	0	0	1	0
10	MF	(Colombia) COL	Stiven Mendoza	10	1	8+1	1	0	0	1	0
14	MF	(France) FRA	Gaoussou Traoré	3	0	1+2	0	0	0	0	0
17	MF	(France) FRA	Alexis Blin	10	1	7+1	1	0	0	2	0
20	MF	(Ivory Coast) CIV	Cheick Timité	8	1	0+6	0	0	0	1+1	1
21	MF	(Poland) POL	Rafał Kurzawa	9	1	2+5	1	0	0	2	0
24	MF	(France) FRA	Mathieu Bodmer	17	1	6+10	1	0	0	1	0
34	MF	(South Africa) RSA	Bongani Zungu	2	0	2	0	0	0	0	0
36	MF	(Cameroon) CMR	Jean-Claude Ngando	0	0	0	0	0	0	0	0
Forwards
7	FW	(Iran) IRI	Saman Ghoddos	16	3	13+2	3	0	0	0+1	0
11	FW	(Colombia) COL	Juan Ferney Otero	17	1	13+2	0	0	0	2	1
13	FW	(France) FRA	Quentin Cornette	4	0	3+1	0	0	0	0	0
15	FW	(Senegal) SEN	Moussa Konaté	11	3	9+2	3	0	0	0	0
29	FW	(Niger) NIG	Seybou Koita	1	0	0	0	0	0	0+1	0
33	FW	(France) FRA	Stanley Segarel	1	0	0+1	0	0	0	0	0
Players transferred out during the season
38	MF	(France) FRA	Réda Rabeï	0	0	0	0	0	0	0	0

Last updated: 19 December 2018
Source: Competitions
