= 2019–20 Amiens SC season =

Amiens
2019–20 season
- President: Bernard Joannin
- Head coach: Luka Elsner
- Stadium: Stade de la Licorne
- Ligue 1: 19th (relegated)
- Coupe de France: Round of 64
- Coupe de la Ligue: Quarter-finals
- Top goalscorer: League: Serhou Guirassy (9); All: Serhou Guirassy (9)
- Biggest win: Amiens 3–1 Marseille
- Biggest defeat: Amiens 0–4 Strasbourg
Home colours	Away colours

The 2019–20 season was Amiens's 76th season in existence and the club's 3rd consecutive season in the top flight of French football. In addition to the domestic league, Amiens participated in this season's editions of the Coupe de France, and the Coupe de la Ligue. The season covered the period from 1 July 2019 to 30 June 2020.

== Players ==
=== Squad ===
As of 5 February 2020.

Note: Flags indicate national team as defined under FIFA eligibility rules; some limited exceptions apply. Players may hold more than one non-FIFA nationality.

No.	Pos.	Nation	Player
1	GK	FRA	Régis Gurtner (Vice-captain)
2	DF	FRA	Prince-Désir Gouano (Captain)
3	DF	ITA	Arturo Calabresi (on loan from Bologna)
4	DF	GHA	Nicholas Opoku (on loan from Udinese)
5	MF	FRA	Eddy Gnahoré
6	MF	FRA	Thomas Monconduit (3rd captain)
7	MF	IRI	Saman Ghoddos
8	MF	RSA	Bongani Zungu
9	FW	FRA	Serhou Guirassy
10	FW	COD	Gaël Kakuta
11	MF	COL	Juan Ferney Otero
12	DF	MLI	Bakaye Dibassy
13	DF	FRA	Christophe Jallet
14	DF	NOR	Haitam Aleesami
15	FW	SEN	Moussa Konaté
16	GK	FRA	Matthieu Dreyer
17	MF	FRA	Alexis Blin

No.	Pos.	Nation	Player
18	DF	FRA	Sanasi Sy
19	MF	COD	Chadrac Akolo (on loan from VfB Stuttgart)
20	FW	COL	Stiven Mendoza
22	FW	FRA	Madih Talal
23	FW	SWE	Jack Lahne
24	MF	FRA	Mathieu Bodmer
27	DF	CMR	Aurélien Chedjou
28	FW	MLI	Fousseni Diabaté (on loan from Leicester City)
29	FW	FRA	Quentin Cornette
30	GK	CMR	Boris Essele
31	MF	FRA	Umit Demirel
32	FW	FRA	Darell Tokpa
35	DF	FRA	Valentin Gendrey
38	FW	FRA	Ulrick Eneme Ella
39	MF	FRA	Jonathan Bumbu
—	FW	BEL	Isaac Mbenza (on loan from Huddersfield)

=== Out on loan ===
Note: Flags indicate national team as defined under FIFA eligibility rules; some limited exceptions apply. Players may hold more than one non-FIFA nationality.

No.	Pos.	Nation	Player
—	DF	FRA	Jordan Lefort (on loan to BSC Young Boys)
—	MF	CIV	Cheick Timité (on loan to Paris FC)
—	MF	FRA	Jayson Papeau (on loan to FC Chambly)

No.	Pos.	Nation	Player
—	MF	FRA	Gaoussou Traoré (on loan to Quevilly-Rouen)
—	MF	POL	Rafał Kurzawa (on loan to Esbjerg fB)

== Pre-season and friendlies ==
Win Draw Loss

24 July 2019 Friendly	Hull City (England)	0–2	(France) Amiens	Kingston upon Hull, England
19:30 BST (UTC+1)			Guirassy 53'; Ghoddos 84'	Stadium: KCOM Stadium

3 August 2019 Friendly	Amiens (France)	0–1	(Spain) Leganés	Amiens, France
21:00 CEST (UTC+2)			Rosales 82'	Stadium: Stade de la Licorne

== Competitions ==
Win Draw Loss

=== Overview ===
Competition	First match	Last match	Starting round	Final position	Record							
Competition	First match	Last match	Starting round	Final position	Pld	W	D	L	GF	GA	GD	Win %
Ligue 1	10 August 2019	6 March 2020	Matchday 1	19th	28	4	11	13	31	50	−19	14.29
Coupe de France	4 January 2020		Round of 64	Round of 64	1	0	1	0	0	0	+0	0.00
Coupe de la Ligue	30 October 2019	8 January 2020	Round of 32	Quarter-finals	3	2	0	1	6	6	+0	66.67
Total					32	6	12	14	37	56	−19	18.75

Source: Soccerway

=== Ligue 1 ===
==== League table ====
Pos	Team	Pld	W	D	L	GF	GA	GD	Pts	PPG	Qualification or relegation
16	Dijon	28	7	9	12	27	37	−10	30	1.07	
17	Saint-Étienne	28	8	6	14	29	45	−16	30	1.07	
18	Nîmes (Note: Originally, the 18th-placed Ligue 1 team would play in promotion-relegation play-offs at the end of the season with a team from Ligue 2 to decide whether they would remain in Ligue 1 for the 2020–21 season, but the play-offs were cancelled and the 18th-placed team remained in Ligue 1.)	28	7	6	15	29	44	−15	27	0.96	
19	Amiens (R)	28	4	11	13	31	50	−19	23	0.82	Relegation to Ligue 2
20	Toulouse (R)	28	3	4	21	22	58	−36	13	0.46	Relegation to Ligue 2

Source: Ligue 1
Rules for classification: 1) Points per game; 2) Head-to-head points; 3) Head-to-head goal difference; 4) Goal difference; 5) Goals scored; 6) Fairplay ranking.
(R) Relegated

==== Results summary ====
Overall								Home						Away					
Pld	W	D	L	GF	GA	GD	Pts	W	D	L	GF	GA	GD	W	D	L	GF	GA	GD
28	4	11	13	31	50	−19	23	3	5	6	17	23	−6	1	6	7	14	27	−13

Source: Ligue 1

==== Results by round ====
Round	1	2	3	4	5	6	7	8	9	10	11	12	13	14	15	16	17	18	19	20	21	22	23	24	25	26	27	28	29	30	31	32	33	34	35	36	37	38
Ground	A	H	H	A	H	A	H	A	H	A	A	H	A	H	A	H	A	H	A	H	A	H	A	H	A	H	A	H	A	H	A	H	A	H	A	H	A	H
Result	L	W	L	L	D	W	L	D	W	D	D	W	L	L	L	D	L	D	L	L	L	D	D	L	D	D	L	D	C	C	C	C	C	C	C	C	C	C
Position	14	9	16	18	16	14	15	16	11	13	14	13	15	16	16	17	17	18	18	18	18	18	19	19	19	19	19	19	19	19	19	19	19	19	19	19	19	19

Source: Ligue 1
A = Away; H = Home; W = Win; D = Draw; L = Loss; C = Cancelled

==== Matches ====
The Ligue 1 schedule was announced on 14 June 2019. The Ligue 1 matches were suspended by the LFP on 13 March 2020 due to COVID-19 until further notices. On 28 April 2020, it was announced that Ligue 1 and Ligue 2 campaigns would not resume, after the country banned all sporting events until September. On 30 April, The LFP ended officially the 2019–20 season.

10 August 2019 1	Nice	2–1	Amiens	Nice
20:00 CEST (UTC+2)	Hérelle 32'; Le Bihan (yellow card) 77'; Tameze (yellow card) 88'; Dante 90+5', (yellow card) 90+5'	Report	Monconduit (yellow card) 6'; Gnahoré (yellow card) 17' (yellow-red card) 27'; Guirassy (yellow card) 77'; Akolo 81'	Stadium: Allianz Riviera; Attendance: 17,718; Referee: Jérémie Pignard

17 August 2019 2	Amiens	1–0	Lille	Amiens
20:00 CEST (UTC+2)	Guirassy 70'; Ghoddos (yellow card) 87'	Report	Soumaré (red card) 39'; Ikoné (yellow card) 49'	Stadium: Stade de la Licorne; Attendance: 12,481; Referee: Karim Abed

24 August 2019 3	Amiens	1–2	Nantes	Amiens
20:00 CEST (UTC+2)	Aleesami (yellow card) 16'; Dibassy (red card) 51'; Lafont 71' (o.g.)	Report	Touré (yellow card) 45+2'; Coulibaly 53'; Simon 84'	Stadium: Stade de la Licorne; Attendance: 11,393; Referee: Jérémy Stinat

31 August 2019 4	Toulouse	2–0	Amiens	Toulouse
20:00 CEST (UTC+2)	Makengo 50'; Koulouris 59'	Report	Lefort (yellow card) 22'	Stadium: Stadium de Toulouse; Attendance: 10,184; Referee: Florent Batta

13 September 2019 5	Amiens	2–2	Lyon	Amiens
20:45 CEST (UTC+2)	Diabaté (yellow card) 3'; Jallet 7'; Monconduit (yellow card) 85'; Aleesami (yellow card) 88'; Bodmer 90+2'	Report	Dembélé 9', 34'; Reine-Adélaïde (yellow card) 74'; Tousart (yellow card) 90+3'	Stadium: Stade de la Licorne; Attendance: 12,577; Referee: Benoît Bastien

21 September 2019 6	Metz	1–2	Amiens	Metz
20:00 CEST (UTC+2)	Diallo 69'; Sunzu (yellow card) 90'	Report	Guirassy 40', (yellow card) 87'; Dibassy 55'	Stadium: Stade Saint-Symphorien; Attendance: 15,106; Referee: Hakim Ben El Hadj

25 September 2019 7	Amiens	1–3	Bordeaux	Amiens
19:00 CEST (UTC+2)	Mendoza 3'; Dibassy (yellow card) 11'; Calabresi (yellow card) 45'	Report	Adli 9', 45+1'; Kwateng (yellow card) 25'; Tchouaméni (yellow card) 31'; Kalu 73'	Stadium: Stade de la Licorne; Attendance: 11,367; Referee: Willy Delajod

28 September 2019 8	Angers	1–1	Amiens	Angers
20:00 CEST (UTC+2)	Cissé (yellow card) 35'; Alioui 83'	Report	Mendoza 13'	Stadium: Stade Raymond Kopa; Attendance: 9,331; Referee: Karim Abed

4 October 2019 9	Amiens	3–1	Marseille	Amiens
20:45 CEST (UTC+2)	Aleesami 11'; Guirassy 41' (pen.); Blin (yellow card) 67'; Mendoza 90+1'	Report	Benedetto 23'; Ćaleta-Car (yellow card) 39'; Lopez (yellow card) 42'; Rongier (yellow card) 66'	Stadium: Stade de la Licorne; Attendance: 12,737; Referee: Johan Hamel

19 October 2019 10	Nîmes	1–1	Amiens	Nîmes
20:00 CEST (UTC+2)	Fomba (yellow card) 24'; Martinez 41'; Briançon (yellow card) 81'	Report	Mendoza (yellow card) 29'; Guirassy (yellow card) 30'; Aleesami (yellow card) 76'; Calabresi 90+5'; Dibassy (yellow card) 90+6'	Stadium: Stade des Costières; Attendance: 12,189; Referee: Jérémy Stinat

27 October 2019 11	Saint-Étienne	2–2	Amiens	Saint-Étienne
17:00 CEST (UTC+2)	Khazri 45'; Fofana (yellow card) 71'; M'Vila (yellow card) 78'; Dibassy 80' (o.g.)	Report	Chedjou (yellow card) 24'; Mendoza 68'; Akolo 76'; Kakuta (yellow card) 79'; Calabresi (yellow card) 90'	Stadium: Stade Geoffroy-Guichard; Attendance: 18,877; Referee: Amaury Delerue

2 November 2019 12	Amiens	1–0	Brest	Amiens
20:00 CET (UTC+1)	Otero 27'; Calabresi (yellow card) 49'; Bodmer (yellow card) 58'; Zungu (yellow card) 90+5'	Report	Chardonnet (yellow card) 54'	Stadium: Stade de la Licorne; Attendance: 12,246; Referee: Frank Schneider

10 November 2019 13	Rennes	3–1	Amiens	Rennes
15:00 CET (UTC+1)	Gboho (yellow card) 16'; Bourigeaud (yellow card) 16'; Hunou 39'; Niang 62'; Raphinha 79' (pen.); Del Castillo (yellow card) 83'	Report	Kakuta (yellow card) 19'; Guirassy 35'; Monconduit (yellow card) 45+1'; Gnahoré (yellow card) 51'; Calabresi (yellow card) 68'	Stadium: Roazhon Park; Attendance: 20,677; Referee: Benoît Bastien

23 November 2019 14	Amiens	0–4	Strasbourg	Amiens
20:00 CET (UTC+1)	Chedjou (yellow card) 70' (yellow-red card) 82'	Report	Caci 43'; Ajorque 56'; Mothiba 72'; Da Costa 76'; Simakan (yellow card) 78'	Stadium: Stade de la Licorne; Attendance: 10,358; Referee: Alain Bieri (Switzerland)

30 November 2019 15	Montpellier	4–2	Amiens	Montpellier
20:00 CET (UTC+1)	Le Tallec 14'; Laborde 64'; Delort 67'; Mollet 72'; Mendes (yellow card) 74'	Report	Lefort (yellow card) 26'; Mendoza (yellow card) 40'; Kakuta 44'; Otero (red card) 53'; Lahne 86'	Stadium: Stade de la Mosson; Attendance: 11,744; Referee: Jérémie Pignard

7 December 2019 17	Monaco	3–0	Amiens	Monaco
20:00 CET (UTC+1)	Ben Yedder 61'; Maripán 67'; Keita 70'	Report		Stadium: Stade Louis II; Attendance: 4,203; Referee: Jérémy Stinat

14 December 2019 18	Amiens	1–1	Dijon	Amiens
20:00 CET (UTC+1)	Akolo (yellow card) 9'; Konaté 28'	Report	Cádiz 19'; Chouiar (yellow card) 44'; Alphonse (yellow card) 62'; Amalfitano (yellow card) 77'	Stadium: Stade de la Licorne; Attendance: 10,530; Referee: Thomas Leonard

21 December 2019 19	Paris Saint-Germain	4–1	Amiens	Paris
20:45 CET (UTC+1)	Mbappé 10', 65'; Neymar 46'; Icardi 84'	Report	Gnahoré (yellow card) 28'; Mendoza 70'	Stadium: Parc des Princes; Attendance: 47,693; Referee: Eric Wattellier

11 January 2020 20	Amiens	1–2	Montpellier	Amiens
20:00 CET (UTC+1)	Dibassy 14', (yellow card) 55'; Blin (yellow card) 62'	Report	Laborde 50'; Sambia (yellow card) 58'; Delort 83'	Stadium: Stade de la Licorne; Attendance: 10,205; Referee: Karim Abed

15 January 2020 16	Amiens	1–1	Reims	Amiens
19:00 CET (UTC+1)	Zungu (yellow card) 20'; Konaté 54'	Report	Kutesa 45+1'; Doumbia (yellow card) 72'; Nkada (yellow card) 78'; Suk (yellow card) 90+4'	Stadium: Stade de la Licorne; Attendance: 10,712; Referee: Johan Hamel
Note: Match originally scheduled for 4 December, but postponed due to fog, and rearranged for 15 January 2020.

25 January 2020 21	Brest	2–1	Amiens	Brest
20:00 CET (UTC+1)	Mendy 51', (yellow card) 68'; Faussurier (yellow card) 57'; Cardona 83'	Report	Guirassy 58' (pen.), (yellow card) 76'; Kakuta (yellow card) 74'; Monconduit (yellow card) 90'	Stadium: Stade Francis-Le Blé; Attendance: 12,866; Referee: Thomas Leonard

1 February 2020 22	Amiens	0–0	Toulouse	Amiens
20:00 CET (UTC+1)	Monconduit (yellow card) 20'; Dibassy (yellow card) 65'; Guirassy (yellow card) 75'	Report	Sangaré (yellow card) 78'; Koné (yellow card) 90+1'	Stadium: Stade de la Licorne; Attendance: 10,992; Referee: François Letexier

5 February 2020 23	Lyon	0–0	Amiens	Décines-Charpieu
19:00 CET (UTC+1)	Jean Lucas (yellow card) 52'	Report	Dibassy (yellow card) 1'; Monconduit (yellow card) 60'	Stadium: Parc Olympique Lyonnais; Attendance: 36,670; Referee: Jérôme Miguelgorry

8 February 2020 24	Amiens	1–2	Monaco	Amiens
20:00 CET (UTC+1)	Guirassy 9'; Diabaté (yellow card) 42'	Report	Silva (yellow card) 66'; Golovin (yellow card) 70'; Jovetić (yellow card) 84'; Ben Yedder 85'; Slimani 90+3'	Stadium: Stade de la Licorne; Attendance: 11,683; Referee: Olivier Thual

15 February 2020 25	Amiens	4–4	Paris Saint-Germain	Amiens
17:30 CET (UTC+1)	Guirassy 5', 90+1', (yellow card) 90+2'; Kakuta 29', (yellow card) 81'; Diabaté 40'; Blin (yellow card) 71'	Report	Herrera 45'; Bakker (yellow card) 49'; Kouassi 60', 65'; Icardi 74'; Verratti (yellow card) 90+3'	Stadium: Stade de la Licorne; Attendance: 14,964; Referee: Hakim Ben El Hadj

22 February 2020 26	Strasbourg	0–0	Amiens	Strasbourg
20:00 CET (UTC+1)	Sissoko (yellow card) 16'; Simakan (yellow card) 86'	Report	Opoku (yellow card) 19'; Zungu (yellow card) 27'; Chedjou (yellow card) 51'; Aleesami (yellow card) 53'; Diabaté (yellow card) 63'; Monconduit (yellow card) 80'	Stadium: Stade de la Meinau; Attendance: 25,076; Referee: Amaury Delerue

29 February 2020 27	Amiens	0–1	Metz	Amiens
20:00 CET (UTC+1)	Blin (yellow card) 59'; Zungu (yellow card) 67'	Report	Boye (yellow card) 18'; Boulaya 26'	Stadium: Stade de la Licorne; Attendance: 12,375; Referee: Johan Hamel

6 March 2020 28	Marseille	2–2	Amiens	Marseille
21:00 CET (UTC+1)	Amavi (yellow card) 17'; Payet (yellow card) 40', (goal) 57'; Sanson 45+1'	Report	Monconduit (yellow card) 38'; Calabresi (yellow card) 60'; Guirassy 84' (pen.); Ghoddos 90+4'	Stadium: Stade Vélodrome; Attendance: 49,748; Referee: François Letexier

29	Amiens	Cancelled	Angers	Amiens
--:-- CET (UTC+1)				Stadium: Stade de la Licorne; Attendance: 0

30	Dijon	Cancelled	Amiens	Dijon
--:-- CET (UTC+1)				Stadium: Stade Gaston Gérard; Attendance: 0

31	Amiens	Cancelled	Rennes	Amiens
--:-- CEST (UTC+2)				Stadium: Stade de la Licorne; Attendance: 0

32	Bordeaux	Cancelled	Amiens	Bordeaux
--:-- CEST (UTC+2)				Stadium: Matmut Atlantique

33	Amiens	Cancelled	Nîmes	Amiens
--:-- CEST (UTC+2)				Stadium: Stade de la Licorne

34	Nantes	Cancelled	Amiens	Nantes
--:-- CEST (UTC+2)				Stadium: Stade de la Beaujoire

35	Amiens	Cancelled	Saint-Étienne	Amiens
--:-- CEST (UTC+2)				Stadium: Stade de la Licorne

36	Reims	Cancelled	Amiens	Reims
--:-- CEST (UTC+2)				Stadium: Stade Auguste-Delaune

37	Lille	Cancelled	Amiens	Villeneuve-d'Ascq
--:-- CEST (UTC+2)				Stadium: Stade Pierre-Mauroy

38	Amiens	Cancelled	Nice	Amiens
--:-- CEST (UTC+2)				Stadium: Stade de la Licorne

=== Coupe de France ===
4 January 2020 Round of 64	Rennes	0–0 (a.e.t.) (5–4 p)	Amiens	Rennes
18:00 CET (UTC+1)	Da Silva (yellow card) 90'	Report	Talal (yellow card) 60'	Stadium: Roazhon Park; Attendance: 13,525; Referee: Mikael Lesage
	Penalties
	Siebatcheu (penalty scored); Hunou (penalty scored); Gboho (penalty missed); Traoré (penalty missed); Del Castillo (penalty scored); Gnagnon (penalty scored); Silva (penalty scored)		(penalty scored) Chedjou; (penalty missed) Talal; (penalty scored) Ghoddos; (penalty scored) Aleesami; (penalty missed) Gnahoré; (penalty scored) Diabaté; (penalty missed) Dibassy

=== Coupe de la Ligue ===
30 October 2019 Round of 32	Amiens	3–2	Angers	Amiens
21:05 CET (UTC+1)	Zungu (yellow card) 35'; Jallet (yellow card) 45'; Otero 47'; Cornette 50'; Blin 90+5'	Report	Cissé (yellow card) 39'; Bahoken 44', (yellow card) 84'; Pavlović (yellow card) 72'; Kanga 83'	Stadium: Stade de la Licorne; Attendance: 5,217; Referee: François Letexier

18 December 2019 Round of 16	Amiens	3–2	Rennes	Amiens
21:05 CET (UTC+1)	Zungu 35', (yellow card) 38'; Mendoza 42'; Cornette (yellow card) 89'; Monconduit 90+1'	Report	Bourigeaud 27' (pen.); Hunou 73'; Raphinha (yellow card) 89'	Stadium: Stade de la Licorne; Attendance: 4,883; Referee: Stéphanie Frappart

8 January 2020 Quarter-finals	Lille	2–0	Amiens	Villeneuve-d'Ascq
21:05 CET (UTC+1)	André (yellow card) 45+1'; Luiz Araújo 50'; Osimhen 58'; Léo (yellow card) 90+2'	Report	Zungu (yellow card) 21' (yellow-red card) 38'; Calabresi (yellow card) 87'	Stadium: Stade Pierre-Mauroy; Attendance: 19,029; Referee: Benoît Bastien
