= Bakaye Dibassy =

Professional footballer (born 1989)

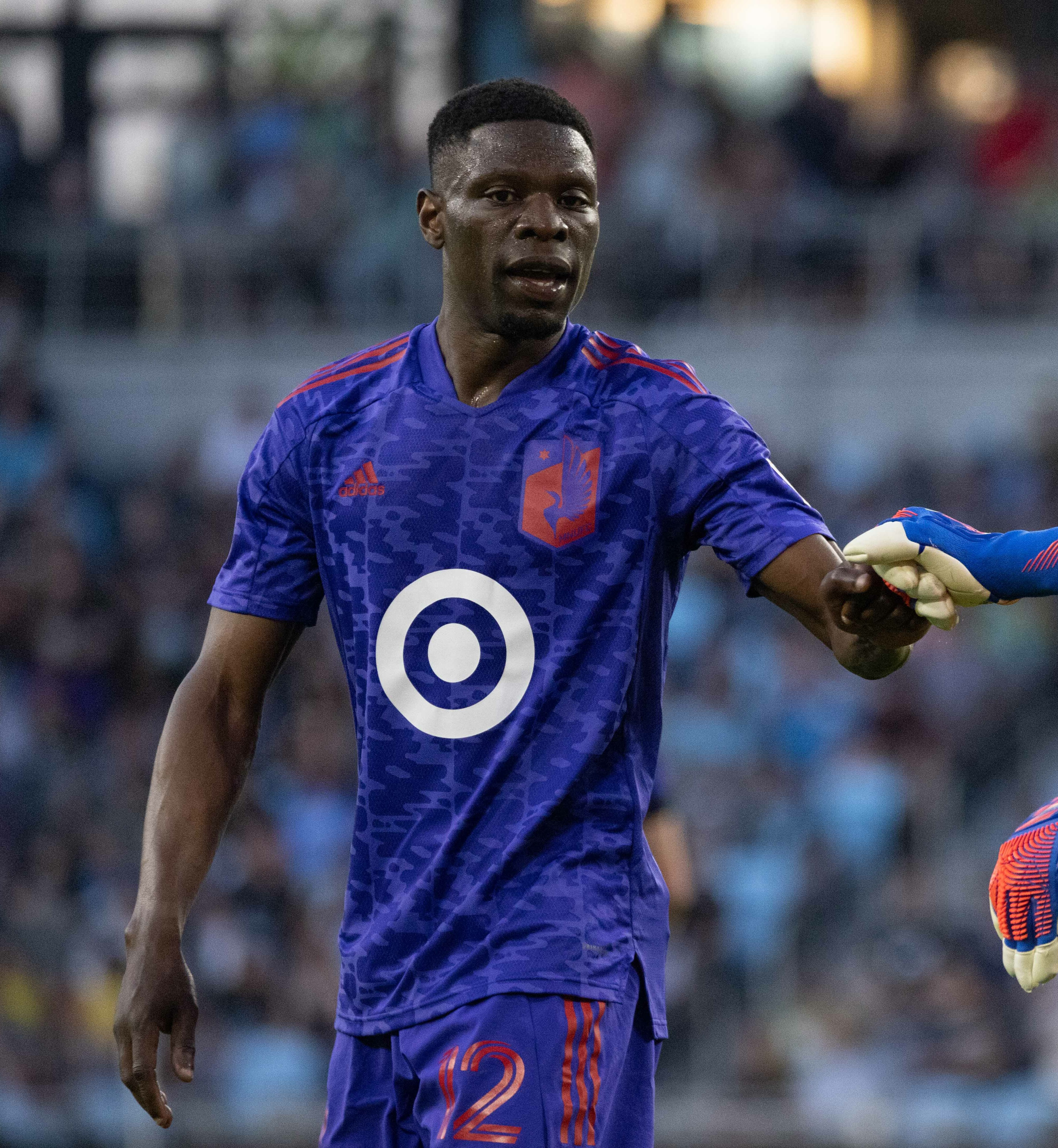
- Dibassy with Minnesota United in 2022

Personal information
- Date of birth: 11 August 1989 (age 37)
- Place of birth: Paris, France
- Height: 1.83 m (6 ft 0 in)
- Position: Defender

Senior career*
Years	Team	Apps	(Gls)
2010–2012	Olympique Noisy-le-Sec		
2012–2013	Bergerac	18	(1)
2013–2014	Stade Montois	25	(2)
2014–2016	Sedan	50	(2)
2016–2020	Amiens	125	(9)
2020–2023	Minnesota United	67	(2)
2024–2025	Valenciennes	19	(0)

International career^{‡}
2017–2019	Mali	4	(0)
- * Club domestic league appearances and goals as of 26 May 2025 ‡ National team caps and goals as of 26 March 2019

Bakaye Dibassy (born 11 August 1989) is a professional footballer. Born in France, he plays for the Mali national team.

== Club career ==
On 16 July 2024, Dibassy signed with Valenciennes in Championnat National.

== International career ==
Dibassy was born in France and is Malian by descent. Dibassy made his debut for the Mali national team in a 6–0 2018 FIFA World Cup qualification loss to Morocco on 1 September 2017.

== Career statistics ==
=== Club ===
As of match played 8 December 2020

Appearances and goals by club, season and competition
Club	Season	League			National Cup		League Cup		Other		Total	
Club	Season	Division	Apps	Goals	Apps	Goals	Apps	Goals	Apps	Goals	Apps	Goals
Bergerac	2012–13	Championnat de France amateur 2	18	1	—		—		—		18	1
Stade Montois	2013–14	Championnat de France Amateur	25	2	1	0	—		—		26	2
Sedan	2014–15	Championnat de France Amateur	25	1	—		—		—		25	1
Sedan	2015–16	Championnat National	25	1	2	0	—		—		27	1
Sedan	Total		50	2	2	0	0	0	0	0	52	2
Amiens	2016–17	Ligue 2	37	5	0	0	0	0	—		37	5
Amiens	2017–18	Ligue 1	32	1	1	0	2	0	—		35	1
Amiens	2018–19	Ligue 1	34	1	1	0	2	0	—		37	1
Amiens	2019–20	Ligue 1	22	2	1	0	2	0	—		25	2
Amiens	Total		125	9	3	0	6	0	0	0	134	9
Minnesota United	2020	MLS	11	0	—		—		3 (Note: Appearance(s) in MLS Cup Playoffs)	2	14	2
Minnesota United	2021	MLS	26	1	—		—		1	0	27	1
Minnesota United	2022	MLS	26	1	1	0	—				27	1
Minnesota United	2023	MLS	11	0	—		3	0			14	0
	Total		9	9	9	9	9	9	9	9	9	9
Valenciennes FC	2024	Championnat National	—	—	—	—	—	—	—	—	—	—
Career total			292	16	7	0	9	0	4	2	312	18

=== International ===
As of match played 26 March 2019

Appearances and goals by national team and year
National team	Year	Apps	Goals
Mali	2017	1	0
Mali	2018	1	0
Mali	2019	2	0
Total		4	0
