= Saman Ghoddos =

Iranian footballer (born 1993)

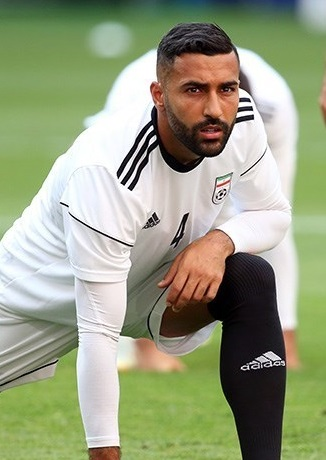
- Ghoddos training at the 2018 FIFA World Cup

Personal information
- Full name: Saman Ghoddos; Seyed Saman Ghoddoos
- Date of birth: 6 September 1993 (age 33)
- Place of birth: Malmö, Sweden
- Height: 1.76 m (5 ft 9 in)
- Positions: Attacking midfielder; winger; wing-back; full-back

Team information
- Current team: Kalba
- Number: 7

Youth career
- 2000–2004: BK Vången
- 2004–2007: FC Malmö
- 2007–2011: IF Limhamn Bunkeflo

Senior career*
Years	Team	Apps	(Gls)
2011–2012	IF Limhamn Bunkeflo	41	(4)
2013	Trelleborgs FF	18	(1)
2014–2015	Syrianska FC	54	(14)
2016–2018	Östersunds FK	65	(29)
2018–2020	Amiens	34	(5)
2020–2021	→ Brentford (loan)	16	(0)
2021–2024	Brentford	78	(5)
2024–	Kalba	43	(9)

International career^{‡}
2017	Sweden	2	(1)
2017–2026	Iran	71	(3)
Medal record
Representing Iran
CAFA Nations Cup
Runner-up	2025 Tajikistan–Uzbekistan	Team
- * Club domestic league appearances and goals as of 15 May 2026 ‡ National team caps and goals as of 27 June 2026

Saman Ghoddos (Persian: سامان قدّوس; born 6 September 1993), known as Seyed Saman Ghoddoos in Iran, (Note: Born in Sweden as Saman Ghoddos, his full name in Iran is Seyed Saman Ghoddoos) is a professional footballer who plays as an attacking midfielder or striker for the Iran national team and Kalba in UAE Pro League. A versatile player, Ghoddos can also be deployed as a winger, wing-back or full-back. Born in Sweden and a former Swedish international, he represents the Iran national team.

== Club career ==
=== Östersund ===
==== 2016 season ====
Saman Ghoddos scored 10 league goals in his first season in the Allsvenskan for Östersunds FK, including their first top-flight goal in his Allsvenskan debut on 4 April 2016 against Hammarby IF. He scored a brace at his hometown club Malmö FF on 22 October in Swedbank Stadion. After his good performances in the 2016 season, Ghoddos drew interest from German club Hertha Berlin and Dutch club Ajax.

==== 2017 season ====
Ghoddos started the 2017 season in fine form, leading Östersund to the Swedish Cup final with six goals in six games, including an acrobatic goal in the quarter-final against Trelleborgs FF and a brace in the semi-final against Häcken. He scored his seventh domestic cup goal of the season in the final, leading Östersund to the second qualifying round of the 2017–18 UEFA Europa League with manager Graham Potter.

In his UEFA debut, Ghoddos scored a goal and provided an assist for a 2–0 win against Galatasaray on 13 July 2017. In the return leg, Ghoddos won a penalty with a dribble past Fernando Muslera. In a league match on 13 August, he scored a long-range goal from 40 meters out against Hammarby IF in Stockholm's Tele2 Arena. On 24 August, Ghoddos scored two goals in the Europa League play-offs against PAOK to qualify his team to the group stages of the competition. He scored the club's first tournament proper goal in their group stage debut on 14 September. He won the attacker of the year award at the end of the 2017 Allsvenskan season. On 23 November, Ghoddos scored the winning goal to send his club to the knockout phase of the Europa League.

==== 2018 season ====
I believe that the most impressive in the first game was Ghoddos, who is a marvellous player. Technically and tactically, I was impressed by him.

— Arsenal manager Arsène Wenger on Ghoddos, 22 February 2018.

Ghoddos provided two assists in his side's 2–1 win in the second leg of the Europa League round of 32 against English Premier League side Arsenal in London, though they were defeated 4–2 on aggregate. He scored his first league goal of the season on 15 April against IFK Göteborg, and scored a free kick on 30 April against Brommapojkarna. On 14 May, he scored from a free kick against AIK in the Friends Arena. He scored another goal in the next game during a derby match against GIF Sundsvall. Upon returning from the World Cup, Ghoddos captained his club side and scored a goal in a 2–1 win at Hammarby. He scored another free kick in the following match on 14 July at Malmö FF. Ghoddos scored a brace in the following match against Trelleborg to become joint-top scorer of the 2018 Allsvenskan. He subsequently won the Allsvenskan player of the month award for his performances in July.

=== Amiens ===
On 23 August 2018, Ghoddos transferred to French Ligue 1 side Amiens SC signing a five-year contract. The transfer fee paid to Östersund was reported as 40 million SEK (about €3.8 million) plus bonuses which would make the transfer the third-most expensive in Allsvenskan history after Alexander Isak and Zlatan Ibrahimović. However, the transfer was put in doubt by La Liga newcomers SD Huesca contacting FIFA to enquire about the validity of their own agreement to sign Ghoddos. Ghoddos had signed a contract with the Spanish club which also had a written agreement with Östersund. Previously, Stade Rennais had decided against signing Ghoddos.

Ghoddos made his competitive debut for Amiens on 25 August 2018 in the Ligue 1 4–1 home win over Reims, scoring a goal for Amiens in the 58th minute. He thus became the first Iranian player to play in Ligue 1.

On 29 August 2019, FIFA suspended Ghoddos from all games for four months plus a €4 million fine for his failed transfer to Huesca. On 10 November 2020, the Court of Arbitration for Sport partially upheld the ruling with the fine being removed but Östersund being banned from signing new players for the next two transfer windows.

=== Brentford ===
On 21 September 2020, Ghoddos joined English Championship side Brentford on a one-year loan deal with a subsequent option for a two-year permanent deal. He made his club debut on 1 October 2020 with an assist to Marcus Forss in an EFL Cup match against Fulham. He scored his first goal for the club and provided an assist on 9 January 2021 in an FA Cup match against Middlesbrough.

On 14 January 2021, Ghoddos completed a permanent move to Brentford, with a contract that runs until the summer of 2023 with the option for an extra year. He scored his first league goal for the club on 20 January 2021 against Luton Town. In May 2021, Ghoddos and Brentford clinched promotion to the Premier League, the first top-flight appearance for the club in 74 years. He made his Premier League debut on 21 August 2021 against Crystal Palace at Selhurst Park. Ghoddos scored his first goal in the Premier League on 30 October 2021 against Burnley. On 14 May 2023, Brentford announced that Ghoddos would be departing the club at the end of the 2022–23 season.

On 25 August 2023, Ghoddos re-signed with Brentford on a one-year deal for the 2023–24 season. He scored his first goal of the season after coming on as a substitute in a 3–0 victory against Burnley on 21 October 2023, which was voted the Premier League Goal of the Month on 10 November 2023. Ghoddos was released by Brentford when his contract expired at the end of the 2023–24 campaign.

=== Ittihad Kalba ===
On 29 September 2024, Ghoddos signed for Ittihad Kalba on a free transfer.

== International career ==
=== Sweden ===
Due to his Iranian heritage, Ghoddos was eligible to be called up by both Iran and Sweden. In December 2016, Ghoddos was called up by Sweden manager Janne Andersson for friendlies against Ivory Coast and Slovakia. He made his debut against the Ivory Coast on 8 January 2017 and scored his first international goal for Sweden in a 6–0 win over Slovakia on 12 January 2017.

=== Iran ===
In June 2017, Ghoddos revealed that he had been approached by the Iranian federation. In an interview in July 2017, Ghoddos stated that he may accept an invitation to play for Carlos Queiroz's Iran should he be given one. He applied for Iranian citizenship on 21 August, stating that it is an honour to play for Sweden and his decision to represent either country is "fifty-fifty". He was not called into Sweden's World Cup qualification squad on 23 August, with Janne Andersson opting to choose expatriate footballers and stating that Ghoddos is not far from a call-up if he were to remain with the Sweden national team.

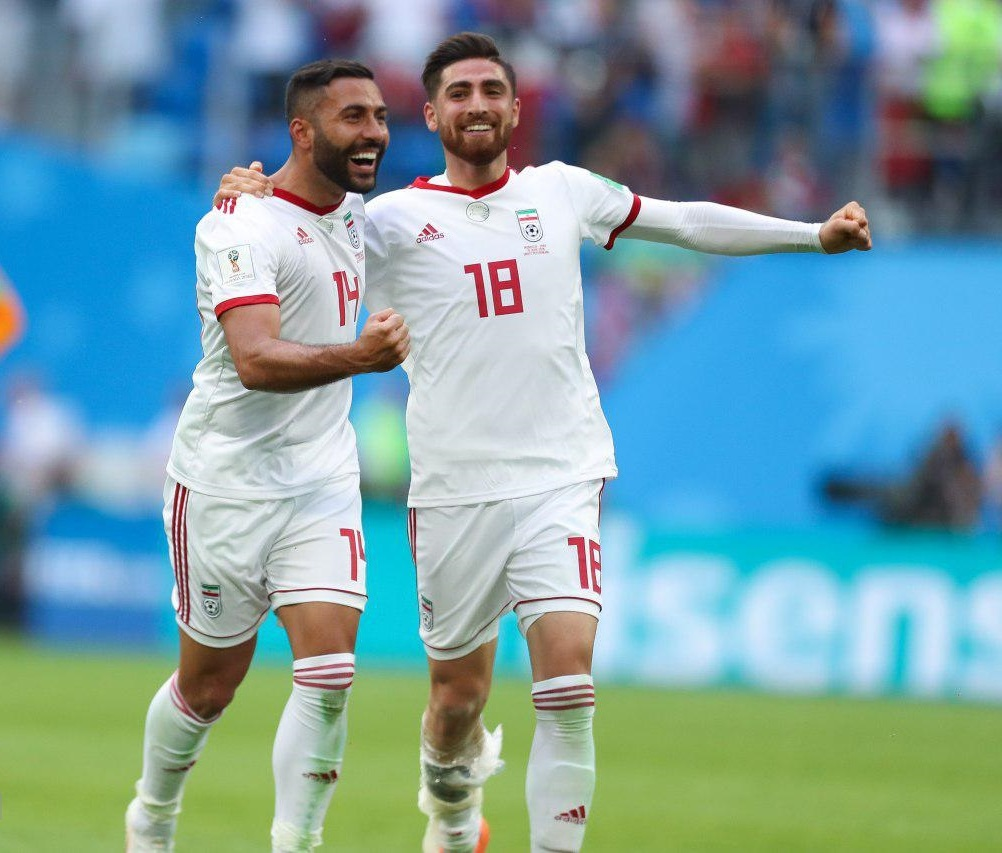
Ghoddos playing for Iran at the 2018 FIFA World Cup

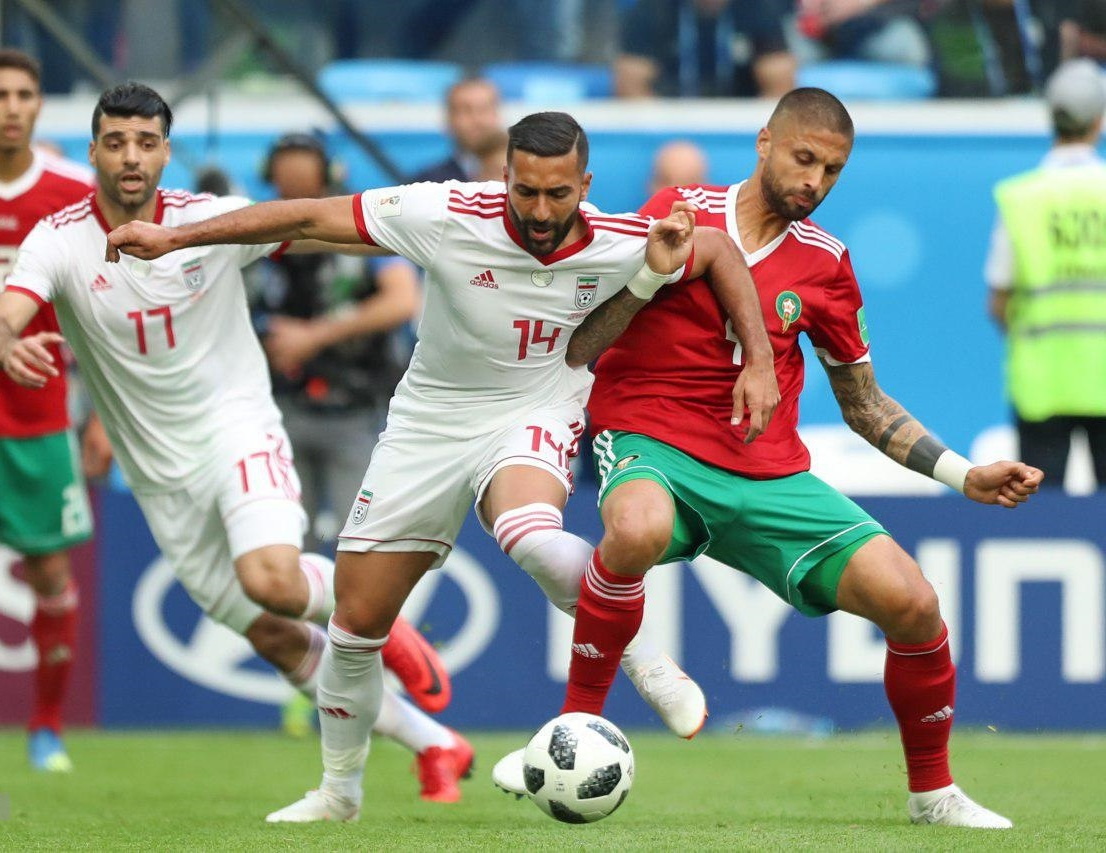
Ghoddos playing for Iran against Morocco in the 2018 FIFA World Cup

On 25 August 2017, Ghoddos revealed in an interview that he acquired his Iranian passport from the embassy. The following day, 26 August 2017, he announced on his Instagram page that he would be joining Iran for their 2018 World Cup qualifiers against South Korea and Syria. Ghoddos was called up for the first time for the Iran senior team training camps on 27 August 2017 by coach Carlos Queiroz for Iran's 2018 FIFA World Cup qualifying matches against South Korea and Syria. After Ghoddos couldn't make his debut for Iran due to administrative issues with FIFA, he was called into Sweden's World Cup qualification squad on 27 September for matches against Luxembourg and Netherlands. However, on 29 September, the Swedish Football Association released a statement on their website stating Ghoddos had declined the offer, choosing to play for Iran instead. He made his debut for Iran in a 2–0 friendly victory against Togo on 5 October 2017. On 9 November, he scored his first goal for Iran in a friendly match against Panama.

On 13 May 2018, Ghoddos was named in Queiroz's preliminary squad for the 2018 FIFA World Cup. In an interview with Olof Lundh in May 2018, Ghoddos stated that if the Swedish federation had contacted him earlier, it's very likely for him to have chosen to represent Sweden, though he does not regret his decision to play for Iran. Club teammate Emil Krafth later added that Ghoddos told him he wanted to play for Sweden. He was named in Iran's final 23-man squad for the 2018 World Cup on 4 June 2018. Ghoddos made his World Cup debut against Morocco on 15 June 2018, winning a free kick that led to a goal for Iran's first World Cup win in twenty years. He was used as a substitute in all three World Cup matches against Morocco, Spain and Portugal. After the World Cup in November 2018, Ghoddos faced conscription issues in Iran.

He was named in Queiroz's final squad for the 2019 AFC Asian Cup on 26 December 2018. In the team's opening match of the tournament, Ghoddos came on as a second-half substitute and scored the final goal in a 5–0 victory over Yemen.

In November 2022, Ghoddos was named in the final squad for the 2022 FIFA World Cup. The following year, Ghoddos was named in Iran's 2023 AFC Asian Cup squad, stating in an interview with Olof Lundh during the tournament that there are certain difficulties with playing for Iran's national team and that their conversations are taped by government officials.

In June 2026, Ghoddos was named in Iran's 2026 FIFA World Cup squad.

== Style of play ==
Ghoddos plays as an attacking midfielder, striker or winger, and has been praised for his technical ability and clinical finishing.

== Outside football ==
=== Personal life ===
Ghoddos was born and raised in Malmö and speaks English, Swedish, and Persian. His parents were born in Iran and hail from the city of Ahvaz.

=== Sponsorship ===
He has a contract with American sportswear supplier Nike and wears the Mercurial Vapor line.

=== Name ===
Ghoddos was born in Malmö as Saman Ghoddos. Upon switching allegiance to Iran in 2017, he was given the name Seyed Saman Ghoddoos in Iran.

== Career statistics ==
=== Club ===
As of match played 15 May 2026

Appearances and goals by club, season and competition
Club	Season	League			National cup (Note: Includes Svenska Cupen, Coupe de France, FA Cup)		League cup (Note: Includes Coupe de la Ligue, EFL Cup)		Continental		Total	
Club	Season	Division	Apps	Goals	Apps	Goals	Apps	Goals	Apps	Goals	Apps	Goals
Limhamn Bunkeflo	2011	Division 1	17	0	2	0	—		—		19	0
Limhamn Bunkeflo	2012	Division 1	24	4	1	0	—		—		25	4
Limhamn Bunkeflo	Total		41	4	3	0	—		—		44	4
Trelleborgs FF	2013	Division 1	18	1	0	0	—		—		18	1
Syrianska FC	2014	Superettan	29	6	3	1	—		—		32	7
Syrianska FC	2015	Superettan	25	8	4	2	—		—		29	10
Syrianska FC	Total		54	14	7	3	—		—		61	17
Östersunds FK	2016	Allsvenskan	27	10	4	2	—		—		31	12
Östersunds FK	2017	Allsvenskan	23	8	6	6	—		13 (Note: Appearances in UEFA Europa League)	5	42	19
Östersunds FK	2018	Allsvenskan	15	9	5	2	—		—		20	11
Östersunds FK	Total		65	27	15	10	—		13	5	93	42
Amiens	2018–19	Ligue 1	27	4	0	0	1	0	—		28	4
Amiens	2019–20	Ligue 1	5	1	1	0	1	0	—		7	1
Amiens	2020–21	Ligue 2	2	0	0	0	0	0	—		2	0
Amiens	Total		34	5	1	0	2	0	—		37	5
Brentford (loan)	2020–21	Championship	16	0	1	1	2	0	—		19	1
Brentford	2020–21	Championship	27	3	1	0	0	0	—		28	3
Brentford	2021–22	Premier League	17	1	2	0	4	0	—		23	1
Brentford	2022–23	Premier League	15	0	1	0	2	0	—		18	0
Brentford	2023–24	Premier League	19	1	0	0	1	0	—		20	1
Brentford	Total		94	5	5	1	9	0	—		108	6
Kalba	2024–25	UAE Pro League	18	4	1	0	—		—		19	4
Kalba	2025–26	UAE Pro League	25	5	1	0	—		—		26	5
Kalba	Total		43	9	2	0	—		—		45	9
Career total			349	65	33	14	11	0	13	5	406	84

=== International ===
As of match played 27 June 2026

Appearances and goals by national team and year
National team	Year	Apps^{1}	Goals
Sweden	2017	2	1
Sweden	Total	2	1
Iran	2017	4	1
Iran	2018	11	0
Iran	2019	6	1
Iran	2020	1	0
Iran	2021	7	0
Iran	2022	5	0
Iran	2023	6	0
Iran	2024	15	1
Iran	2025	10	0
Iran	2026	6	0
Iran	Total	71	3
Career total		73	4

- 1.Including friendly match against the Ivory Coast that Swedish Football Association counts but is not officially recognized by FIFA.

International goals

Scores and results list Sweden's and Iran's goal tally first.

No.	Date	Venue	Cap	Opponent	Score	Result	Competition
Sweden goals
1	12 January 2017	Armed Forces Stadium, Abu Dhabi, United Arab Emirates	2	Slovakia	6–0	6–0	Friendly
Iran goals
1	9 November 2017	Liebenauer Stadium, Graz, Austria	3	Panama	2–0	2–1	Friendly
2	7 January 2019	Mohammed bin Zayed Stadium, Abu Dhabi, United Arab Emirates	16	Yemen	5–0	5–0	2019 AFC Asian Cup
3	9 January 2024	Al Rayyan Training, Al Ryyan, Qatar	42	Indonesia	1–0	5–0	Friendly

== Honours ==
Östersunds FK

- Svenska Cupen: 2016–17

Brentford

- EFL Championship play-offs: 2021

Individual

- Allsvenskan Striker of the Year: 2017
- Allsvenskan Player of the Month: July 2018
- Premier League Goal of the Month: October 2023
