= Serhou Guirassy =

Guinea international footballer (born 1996)

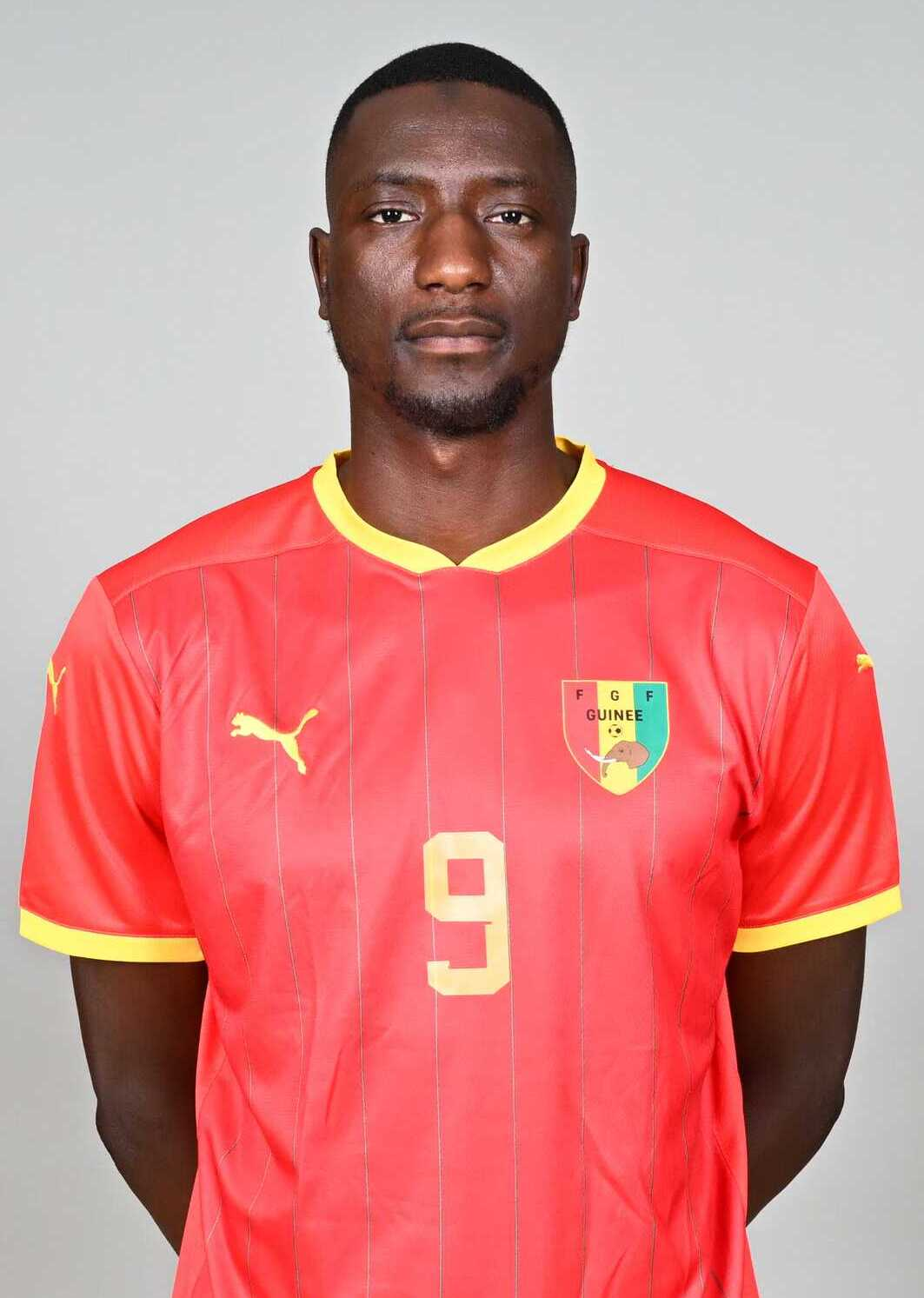
- Guirassy with Guinea in 2024

Personal information
- Full name: Serhou Yadaly Guirassy
- Date of birth: 12 March 1996 (age 30)
- Place of birth: Arles, France
- Height: 1.87 m (6 ft 2 in)
- Position: Striker

Team information
- Current team: Borussia Dortmund
- Number: 9

Youth career
- 2009–2010: Montargis
- 2010–2011: Amilly
- 2011–2013: Laval

Senior career*
Years	Team	Apps	(Gls)
2012–2015	Laval B	17	(14)
2013–2015	Laval	33	(6)
2015–2016	Lille	8	(0)
2015–2016	→ Lille B	4	(4)
2016	→ Auxerre (loan)	16	(8)
2016–2017	1. FC Köln II	5	(2)
2016–2019	1. FC Köln	37	(6)
2018	→ Amiens (loan)	13	(3)
2019–2020	Amiens	24	(10)
2020–2023	Rennes	65	(19)
2022–2023	→ VfB Stuttgart (loan)	22	(11)
2023–2024	VfB Stuttgart	28	(28)
2024–	Borussia Dortmund	71	(41)

International career^{‡}
2012	France U16	4	(1)
2014–2015	France U19	11	(6)
2015–2016	France U20	9	(4)
2022–	Guinea	30	(12)
- * Club domestic league appearances and goals as of 20:30, 31 October 2026 (UTC) ‡ National team caps and goals as of 23:00, 1 October 2026 (UTC)

Serhou Yadaly Guirassy (born 12 March 1996) is a professional footballer who plays as a striker for Bundesliga club Borussia Dortmund. Born in France, he plays for the Guinea national team.

Guirassy began his career at Laval, before playing for Lille, 1. FC Köln, Amiens and Rennes. He later joined VfB Stuttgart, where he set a club record by scoring 28 league goals in the 2023–24 season. In 2024, he moved to Borussia Dortmund, where he became their record top scorer in a single Champions League campaign with 13 goals in 2024–25. He was also their top scorer in the league in his first two seasons with 38 goals in 63 matches.

After initially representing France at various youth levels, Guirassy switched to Guinea, making his debut in 2022 and appearing for them at the 2023 Africa Cup of Nations.

== Early life ==
Guirassy was born in Arles, France, to Guinean parents.

== Club career ==
Guirassy started his career playing for Montargis, Amilly and Laval.

=== Lille ===
In July 2015, Guirassy joined Lille from Laval, signing a four-year contract. The transfer fee was reported to be around €1 million.

=== 1. FC Köln ===
Guirassy joined 1. FC Köln in July 2016, signing a five-year contract. Soon after arriving at Köln, he underwent meniscus surgery. Later in the first half of the 2016–17 season, muscular problems kept him out of action. He made his Bundesliga debut on matchday 26 on 1 April 2017, in a 2–1 defeat against Hamburger SV. Days later, he was again kept from playing by muscular issues. Towards the end of the season, Guirassy nursed an inflammation of the pubic bone joint.

In his second season, he scored his first goal in a 2–1 away defeat against Bayer Levekusen on 28 October 2017. Five days later, he scored his first goal in the Europa League in a 5–2 victory over BATE Borisov. Later that month, he scored the only goal in a 1–0 win against Arsenal in the same tournament. Eventually, 1. FC Köln finished last in the league to be relegated, with Guirassy being their top scorer in all competitions.

=== Amiens ===
In January 2019, he was loaned to Amiens until the end of the season. Amiens exercised an option and bought the rights for Guirassy for the upcoming season. Transfer fees were reported to be about 5 to 6 million Euros. Amiens later took advantage of the option and turned the deal permanent.

On 15 February 2020, he scored a brace in a 4–4 draw against Paris Saint-Germain, with his second goal equalized the match in the stoppage time. However, Amiens were relegated while being at 19th position, when the league was suspended prematurely following the outbreak of COVID-19 in France.

=== Rennes ===
On 27 August 2020, Guirassy joined Ligue 1 side Rennes on a five-year deal. He scored his first two goals for the club in the same match, a 4–2 league win against Nîmes. On 20 October 2020, he scored his first Champions League goal in a 1–1 draw against Krasnodar in the 2020–21 season, which was also his club's first ever goal in the competition. On 20 March 2022, he scored his first career hat-trick in a 6–1 thrashing of FC Metz.

=== VfB Stuttgart ===
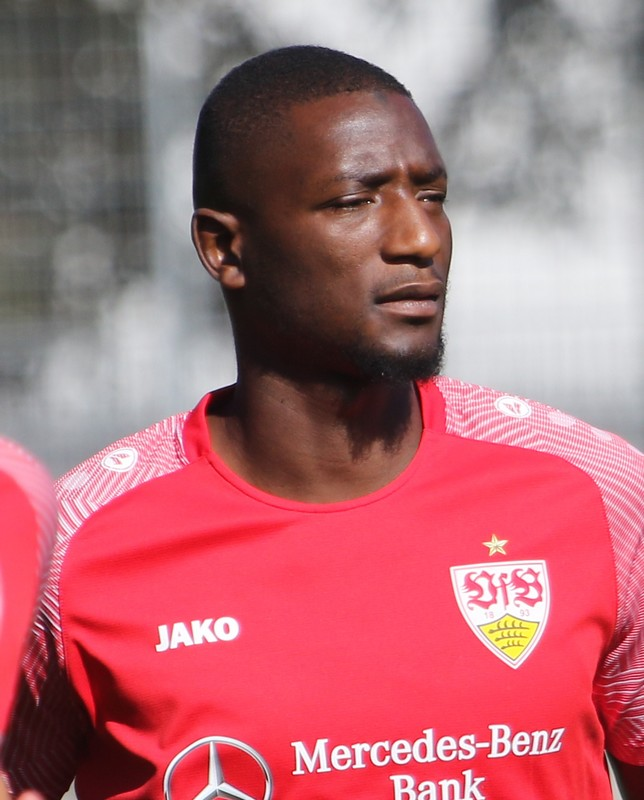
Guirassy with VfB Stuttgart in 2022

On 1 September 2022, Guirassy joined Bundesliga club VfB Stuttgart on loan for the 2022–23 season. On 31 May 2023, the club announced that they had activated the option to make the move permanent, signing a three-year contract.

In the 2023–24 season, Guirassy scored ten goals in the first five matches, including his first Bundesliga hat-trick which came against Mainz, to equal a previous record set by Robert Lewandowski in 2020–21. He also set the Bundesliga record for most goals by a player in the first seven matches of a season by scoring a hat-trick within 15 minutes in a 3–1 win against Wolfsburg. This set the record at 13 goals, overtaking Lewandowski's record of 11 in both 2019–20 and 2020–21. After scoring his 14th goal of the season in an away match against Union Berlin, he was substituted after 30 minutes of play due to a hamstring injury. He later missed two league matches, before he managed to score a penalty to secure a 2–1 victory over Borussia Dortmund, and to reach 15 goals in his first nine matches of the season.

On 13 April 2024, he scored his 25th Bundesliga goal in a 3–0 victory over Eintracht Frankfurt, breaking the record of most goals by a Stuttgart player in a single campaign set by Mario Gómez in the 2008–09 season. A few days later, he was named Player of the Month for March, achieving the prize for the second time in the season after September 2023. On the final matchday of the 2023–24 season, he netted a brace in a 4–0 win over Borussia Mönchengladbach, finishing the season with 28 goals in 28 matches, only behind Harry Kane. Additionally, he scored the opening goal for the 12th time that season during the match, tying a Bundesliga record set by Gerd Müller in 1969–70, Ailton in 2003–04 and Stefan Kießling in 2012–13.

=== Borussia Dortmund ===
On 18 July 2024, Guirassy signed a four-year contract with Borussia Dortmund for a reported transfer fee of €18 million. On 18 September, he scored his first goal from a penalty in a 3–0 away win over Club Brugge in the Champions League group stage. On 11 February 2025, Guirassy scored his tenth goal in the Champions League in a 3–0 away victory over Sporting Lisbon, becoming the third Dortmund player, after Robert Lewandowski and Erling Haaland, to score ten goals in a single Champions League campaign. On 22 February, for the first time in his career, Guirassy scored four goals in a game in a 6–0 home victory over Union Berlin, becoming the third Dortmund player in the 21st century alongside Pierre-Emerick Aubameyang and Erling Haaland to score four goals in a league match.

On 15 April, he netted his first Champions League hat-trick in a 3–1 win over Barcelona – against whom he also scored a brace months prior – during the quarter-finals of the competition, becoming Africa's and Dortmund's all-time top goalscorer in a single campaign with 13 goals. With his hat-trick, he also became one of only four players next to Lewandowski, Marco Reus and Karim Adeyemi to ever score a hat-trick for Dortmund in the competition. Guirassy ended his first Champions League season with Dortmund with fourteen matches played, thirteen goals scored and four assists provided, securing the top scorer spot in the competition alongside Raphinha. Hence, he became the second African player to achieve this feat, only after George Weah in 1994–95. In the 2025 FIFA Club World Cup, he netted a brace in a 2–1 victory over Monterrey, qualifying his club to the quarter-finals, where he scored in a 3–2 loss to Real Madrid.

== International career ==
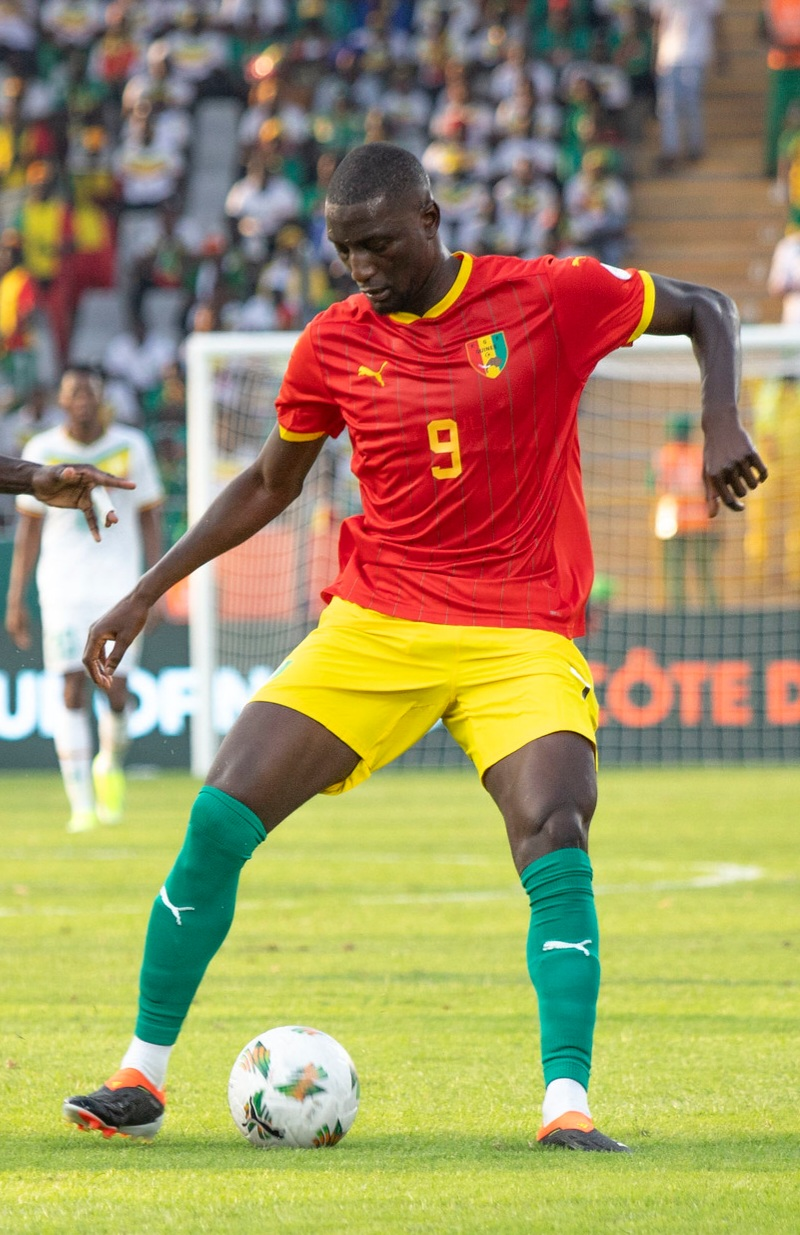
Guirassy with Guinea at the 2023 Africa Cup of Nations

Guirassy was a youth international for France. However, he decided to represent his country of origin, the Republic of Guinea, at senior level. He debuted in the Guinea national team in a 0–0 friendly draw against South Africa on 25 March 2022, held in Kortrijk, Belgium.

In December 2023, he was named in the Guinean squad for the 2023 Africa Cup of Nations in Ivory Coast.

With six goals, Guirassy was the second top scorer during qualification for the 2025 Africa Cup of Nations, only behind Morocco's Brahim Díaz. This was not enough to progress, however, as Guinea missed out on the finals for the first time since 2017.

== Career statistics ==
=== Club ===
As of match played 4 November 2026

Appearances and goals by club, season and competition
Club	Season	League			National cup (Note: Includes Coupe de France, DFB-Pokal)		League cup (Note: Includes Coupe de la Ligue)		Europe		Other		Total	
Club	Season	Division	Apps	Goals	Apps	Goals	Apps	Goals	Apps	Goals	Apps	Goals	Apps	Goals
Laval B	2012–13	Régional 1	1	0	—		—		—		—		1	0
Laval B	2013–14	CFA 2	10	6	—		—		—		—		10	6
Laval B	2014–15	CFA 2	6	8	—		—		—		—		6	8
Laval B	Total		17	14	—		—		—		—		17	14
Laval	2013–14	Ligue 2	4	0	0	0	0	0	—		—		4	0
Laval	2014–15	Ligue 2	29	6	2	1	3	0	—		—		34	7
Laval	Total		33	6	2	1	3	0	—		—		38	7
Lille B	2015–16	CFA 2	4	4	—		—		—		—		4	4
Lille	2015–16	Ligue 1	8	0	0	0	1	1	—		—		9	1
Auxerre (loan)	2015–16	Ligue 2	16	8	—		—		—		—		16	8
1. FC Köln II	2016–17	Regionalliga West	4	2	—		—		—		—		4	2
1. FC Köln II	2017–18	Regionalliga West	1	0	—		—		—		—		1	0
1. FC Köln II	Total		5	2	—		—		—		—		5	2
1. FC Köln	2016–17	Bundesliga	6	0	0	0	—		—		—		6	0
1. FC Köln	2017–18	Bundesliga	15	4	2	1	—		5 (Note: Appearances in UEFA Europa League)	2	—		22	7
1. FC Köln	2018–19	2. Bundesliga	16	2	1	0	—		—		—		17	2
1. FC Köln	Total		37	6	3	1	—		5	2	—		45	9
Amiens (loan)	2018–19	Ligue 1	13	3	—		—		—		—		13	3
Amiens	2019–20	Ligue 1	23	9	1	0	0	0	—		—		24	9
Amiens	2020–21	Ligue 2	1	1	—		—		—		—		1	1
Amiens	Amiens total		37	13	1	0	0	0	—		—		38	13
Rennes	2020–21	Ligue 1	27	10	1	1	—		4 (Note: Appearances in UEFA Champions League)	2	—		32	13
Rennes	2021–22	Ligue 1	37	9	2	0	—		9 (Note: Appearances in UEFA Europa Conference League)	3	—		48	12
Rennes	2022–23	Ligue 1	1	0	—		—		—		—		1	0
Rennes	Total		65	19	3	1	—		13	5	—		81	25
VfB Stuttgart (loan)	2022–23	Bundesliga	22	11	4	2	—		—		2 (Note: Appearances in Bundesliga relegation play-offs)	1	28	14
VfB Stuttgart	2023–24	Bundesliga	28	28	2	2	—		—		—		30	30
VfB Stuttgart	Stuttgart total		50	39	6	4	—		—		2	1	58	44
Borussia Dortmund	2024–25	Bundesliga	30	21	1	0	—		14	13	5 (Note: Appearances in FIFA Club World Cup)	4	50	38
Borussia Dortmund	2025–26	Bundesliga	33	17	3	1	—		10	4	—		46	22
Borussia Dortmund	2026–27	Bundesliga	8	3	1	1	—		4	4	1 (Note: Appearance in Franz Beckenbauer Supercup)	0	14	8
Borussia Dortmund	Total		71	41	5	2	—		28	21	6	4	110	68
Career total			344	153	20	9	4	1	45	27	8	5	421	193

=== International ===
As of match played 1 October 2026

Appearances and goals by national team and year
National team	Year	Apps	Goals
Guinea	2022	5	0
Guinea	2023	7	3
Guinea	2024	10	6
Guinea	2025	4	1
Guinea	2026	4	2
Total		30	12

Scores and results list Guinea's goal tally first, score column indicates score after each Guirassy goal.

List of international goals scored by Serhou Guirassy
No.	Date	Venue	Cap	Opponent	Score	Result	Competition
1	14 June 2023	Marrakesh Stadium, Marrakesh, Morocco	6	Egypt	1–0	1–2	2023 Africa Cup of Nations qualification
2	17 June 2023	RCDE Stadium, Barcelona, Spain	7	Brazil	1–2	1–4	Friendly
3	17 October 2023	Estádio Algarve, Faro/Loulé, Portugal	10	Gabon	1–0	1–1	Friendly
4	12 October 2024	Alassane Ouattara Stadium, Abidjan, Ivory Coast	19	Ethiopia	1–0	4–1	2025 Africa Cup of Nations qualification
5	12 October 2024	Alassane Ouattara Stadium, Abidjan, Ivory Coast	19	Ethiopia	2–0	4–1	2025 Africa Cup of Nations qualification
6	12 October 2024	Alassane Ouattara Stadium, Abidjan, Ivory Coast	19	Ethiopia	3–0	4–1	2025 Africa Cup of Nations qualification
7	15 October 2024	Alassane Ouattara Stadium, Abidjan, Ivory Coast	20	Ethiopia	1–0	3–0	2025 Africa Cup of Nations qualification
8	15 October 2024	Alassane Ouattara Stadium, Abidjan, Ivory Coast	20	Ethiopia	3–0	3–0	2025 Africa Cup of Nations qualification
9	16 November 2024	Alassane Ouattara Stadium, Abidjan, Ivory Coast	21	DR Congo	1–0	1–0	2025 Africa Cup of Nations qualification
10	5 September 2025	Mandela National Stadium, Kampala, Uganda	25	Somalia	1–0	3–0	2026 FIFA World Cup qualification
11	27 March 2026	Moulay El Hassan Stadium, Rabat, Morocco	27	Togo	2–2	2–2	Friendly
12	1 October 2026	28 September Stadium, Conakry, Guinea	30	Kenya	1–0	1–0	2027 Africa Cup of Nations qualification

== Honours ==
1. FC Köln

- 2. Bundesliga: 2018–19

Individual

- Bundesliga Player of the Month: September 2023, March 2024, February 2025
- Bundesliga Team of the Season: 2023–24 2024–25
- VDV Bundesliga Team of the Season: 2023–24
- kicker Bundesliga Team of the Season: 2023–24, 2024–25
- UEFA Champions League top scorer: 2024–25 (shared)
