= Eddy Gnahoré =

French footballer (born 1993)

Personal information
- Full name: Vhakka Eddy Stelh Gnahoré
- Date of birth: 14 November 1993 (age 32)
- Place of birth: Villeneuve-la-Garenne, France
- Height: 1.88 m (6 ft 2 in)
- Position: Midfielder

Team information
- Current team: FCSB
- Number: 8

Youth career
- 2000–2003: C.O. Savigny
- 2003–2005: Morangis-Chilly
- 2005–2008: Centre de Formation Paris
- 2008–2009: Châteauroux
- 2009–2010: Manchester City
- 2010–2013: Birmingham City

Senior career*
Years	Team	Apps	(Gls)
2012–2013	Birmingham City	0	(0)
2014–2016	Carrarese	43	(4)
2016–2017	Napoli	0	(0)
2016	→ Carpi (loan)	0	(0)
2016–2017	→ Crotone (loan)	1	(0)
2017	→ Perugia (loan)	13	(1)
2017–2019	Palermo	32	(4)
2018–2019	→ Amiens (loan)	34	(4)
2019–2022	Amiens	31	(2)
2020	→ Wuhan Zall (loan)	14	(1)
2022–2024	Ascoli	14	(0)
2024–2026	Dinamo București	87	(6)
2026–	FCSB	7	(0)

International career
2011	France U18	2	(0)
- * Club domestic league appearances and goals as of 10 October 2026

Vhakka Eddy Stelh Gnahoré (born 14 November 1993) is a French professional footballer who plays as a midfielder for Liga I club FCSB.

He began his professional career in England with Birmingham City, for whom he played in the FA Cup, and then moved to Italy where he spent one-and-a-half seasons with Carrarese. He joined Napoli in January 2016, and was immediately loaned to Carpi, but before making an appearance for them, he was involved in a car accident and missed the rest of the season. He spent the first half of 2016–17 on loan to Crotone before being recalled by Napoli and immediately loaned to Perugia. In July 2017, he signed a four-year contract with Palermo. He returned to France with Amiens, initially on loan, and spent the 2020 season with Chinese Super League club Wuhan Zall before returning to Amiens. He joined Ascoli in August 2022 and joined Dinamo București in January 2024.

He has represented France at under-18 level.

== Club career ==
Gnahoré was born in Villeneuve-la-Garenne, in the Paris suburbs, of Ivorian descent. As a youngster, he played for C.O. Savigny, from 2000 to 2003, and then for Morangis-Chilly until he joined the Paris Centre de Formation in November 2005. He remained there until 2008, when he joined the youth system of Châteauroux. After one season, he moved to England where he joined Manchester City's youth system in July 2009. When he decided to leave Manchester City, he joined Birmingham City's Academy, whose then director, Terry Westley, described him as "not really a Vieira because he's not a tackler. He's more a number 10 who can also do a shift in midfield." When he turned 18, in November 2011, Gnahoré signed his first professional contract, to run until 2014.

He was given a first-team squad number in January 2012, and his first competitive involvement came when he was named among the substitutes for the third-round FA Cup replay against Wolverhampton Wanderers, remaining unused.

Gnahoré made his first-team debut on 28 January, coming on as an 80th-minute substitute for Chris Burke in the fourth-round FA Cup-tie against Sheffield United at Bramall Lane, with Birmingham already 4–0 ahead. He ruptured his anterior cruciate ligament (ACL) in training in February, and was predicted to be out of football for as much as nine months. He returned to first-team consideration when given a squad number and a place on the bench for the visit to Leeds United in the third round of the FA Cup in January 2013. In August 2013, Gnahoré had a trial with Mansfield Town, and on the last day of the summer transfer window, his contract with Birmingham City was terminated by mutual consent.

After leaving Birmingham, Gnahoré had trials with clubs including Troyes, Saint-Étienne and Olympique Marseille, before signing for Italian third-tier club Carrarese in July 2014. He became a regular selection in their first team, and scored his first goal in his ninth league match, a header to give his team a second-half lead against Santarcangelo on 26 October, but the visitors equalised in stoppage time.

On 26 January 2016, Gnahoré signed for Napoli, who immediately loaned him to fellow Serie A club Carpi until the end of the 2016–17 season. While driving home from training on 13 February, Gnahoré was involved in a serious accident when his car struck a lorry. He was taken to hospital by air ambulance. He was reported to have suffered injuries to head and pelvis which were not life-threatening. The injuries kept him out for the rest of the season, at the end of which Carpi were relegated and Gnahoré returned to his parent club.

He was loaned to another Serie A club, the newly promoted Crotone, for the 2016–17 season, and finally made his Crotone and Serie A debut on 14 January 2017, as a 64th-minute substitute in a 1–0 home defeat against Bologna. That was Gnahoré's only first-team appearance for the club. On the last day of the transfer window, Napoli recalled him and immediately loaned him to Perugia of Serie B until the end of the 2017–18 season. He made his debut in the starting eleven for the visit to Ternana, a match which Perugia won 1–0, but his appearance drew a protest from Ternana about his eligibility. League rules allow a player to register for no more than three member clubs in the same season. Perugia argued that, if a player is recalled from loan by his parent club and loaned to another club on the same day, the brief time technically spent with the parent does not count towards the three. The league ruled in Perugia's favour, but Ternana planned to appeal to a higher authority. Once confirmed as a Perugia player, he appeared in two-thirds of their remaining matches, and scored once, in a 2–2 draw with Pisa.

Gnahoré signed a four-year contract with another Serie B club, Palermo, in July 2017. According to the Corriere dello Sport, the fee was €1.5 million and Napoli had a buy-back clause included in the deal. He contributed 4 goals from 35 appearances as Palermo finished fourth but lost out in the play-off final.

He then returned to his native France where he signed on loan for Ligue 1 club Amiens for the season. The deal included an option to purchase. He made his debut in the starting eleven for the opening match of the 2018–19 Ligue 1 campaign, a 2–0 defeat away to Olympique Lyonnais, and on his third appearance, opened the scoring in a 4–1 win against Reims, collecting the ball with his back to goal and deceiving the goalkeeper from close range. Amiens redeemed the player at the end of the season.

He was loaned to Chinese Super League club Wuhan Zall for the 2020 season; the contract included an option to purchase. After a lengthy wait for the season to start after COVID-19 pandemic-related delays, he played regularly, making 14 appearances between August and October and scoring once. He was injured on 29 October, in what proved to be his last game for Wuhan Zall, and underwent cruciate ligament surgery in December.

Gnahoré returned to Amiens for pre-season training in 2021, but six matches into the 2021–22 Ligue 2 season, head coach Philippe Hinschberger still did not consider him physically ready for competitive football. He made his first appearance of the season on 23 October, as a late substitute, his first start came a month later, and although he had been expected to leave in January, he gradually resumed a regular place in the starting eleven and stated that he was happy at the club and the best thing for him would be to stay.

Gnahoré returned to Italian football on 31 August 2022, signing a two-year contract with Serie B club Ascoli. He was an unused substitute for the first match after his arrival, then twisted a knee during training and required surgery to reconstruct the ACL and repair the medial meniscus in his right knee. He trained with the first team in April 2023, was on the bench by the end of the month, and the coach said he needed game time to get back to his peak and would use him if he saw fit. He was not used that season, but began the 2023–24 season as a regular in the matchday squad.

In January 2024, he left Ascoli and joined Romanian Liga I club Dinamo București. He made his debut for the club on 20 January 2024, when he came in as a substitute in the 46th minute in the 1–0 loss away to Petrolul Ploiești. On 18 February 2024, he scored his first goal for Dinamo, in the 3-1 home win against Oțelul Galați. For his performance in this game, Gnahoré was selected in the Liga I Team of the Week. On 26 April, he scored again in the 1-1 home draw against FC Voluntari in the Liga I relegation group. He made 16 appearances as Dinamo finished 13th, so faced a play-off against Csíkszereda of Liga II to decide which would play top-flight football in 2024–25. Gnahoré started both legs of the play-off, which Dinamo won 2–0 on aggregate to avoid relegation.

Gnahoré started the 2024–25 season as third captain for Dinamo. He wore the captain armband for the first time in an official game on 18 August 2024, in the Bucarest derby against Rapid. On 24 August, he scored in the 2-1 home win against CS Universitatea Craiova, being named Man of the Match and in the Liga I Team of the Week.

== International career ==
Gnahoré played twice for the France under-18 team. He played the first half of a friendly match against the Belgium under-18s on 25 January 2011, and two days later appeared as a late substitute against the same opponents.

== Career statistics ==
As of match played 29 October 2026

Appearances and goals by club, season and competition
Club	Season	League			National cup (Note: Includes FA Cup, Coppa Italia, Coupe de France, Chinese FA Cup, Cupa României)		Continental		Other		Total	
Club	Season	Division	Apps	Goals	Apps	Goals	Apps	Goals	Apps	Goals	Apps	Goals
Birmingham City	2011–12	Championship	0	0	1	0	—		0	0	1	0
Birmingham City	2012–13	Championship	0	0	0	0	—		0	0	0	0
Birmingham City	Total		0	0	1	0	—		0	0	1	0
Carrarese	2014–15	Lega Pro	31	1	—		—		1 (Note: Appearance(s) in Coppa Italia Lega Pro)	0	32	1
Carrarese	2015–16	Lega Pro	12	3	—		—		2	0	14	3
Carrarese	Total		43	4	—		—		3	0	46	4
Napoli	2015–16	Serie A	—		—		—		—		—	
Carpi (loan)	2015–16	Serie A	0	0	—		—		—		0	0
Crotone (loan)	2016–17	Serie A	1	0	0	0	—		—		1	0
Perugia (loan)	2016–17	Serie B	13	1	—		—		1 (Note: Appearance(s) in promotion play-offs)	0	14	1
Palermo	2017–18	Serie B	32	4	1	0	—		3	0	36	4
Amiens (loan)	2018–19	Ligue 1	34	4	2	0	—		2 (Note: Appearance(s) in Coupe de la Ligue)	0	38	4
Amiens	2019–20	Ligue 1	17	0	1	0	—		2	0	20	0
Amiens	2020–21	Ligue 2	0	0	0	0	—		—		0	0
Amiens	2021–22	Ligue 2	14	2	6	2	—		—		20	4
Amiens	Total		65	6	9	2	—		4	0	78	8
Wuhan Zall (loan)	2020	Chinese Super League	14	1	0	0	—		0	0	14	1
Ascoli	2022–23	Serie B	0	0	0	0	—		—		0	0
Ascoli	2023–24	Serie B	14	0	1	0	—		—		15	0
Ascoli	Total		14	0	1	0	—		—		15	0
Dinamo București	2023–24	Liga I	16	2	—		—		2 (Note: Appearances in Liga I promotion/relegation play-offs)	0	18	2
Dinamo București	2024–25	Liga I	33	2	3	0	—		—		36	2
Dinamo București	2025–26	Liga I	38	2	4	0	—		1 (Note: Appearances in Liga I European play-offs)	0	43	2
Dinamo București	Total		87	6	7	0	—		3	0	97	6
FCSB	2026–27	Liga I	7	0	2	1	2 (Note: Appearances in UEFA Conference League)	0	—		11	1
Career total			276	22	21	3	2	0	14	0	313	25
