= Prince-Désir Gouano =

French footballer (born 1993)

Personal information
- Full name: Prince Désiré Gnahoré Gouano
- Date of birth: 24 December 1993 (age 32)
- Place of birth: Paris, France
- Height: 1.88 m (6 ft 2 in)
- Position: Centre-back

Youth career
- 2002–2007: CFF Paris
- 2007–2011: Le Havre

Senior career*
Years	Team	Apps	(Gls)
2011	Le Havre	1	(0)
2011–2013	Juventus	0	(0)
2012	→ Virtus Lanciano (loan)	1	(0)
2013	→ Vicenza (loan)	1	(0)
2013–2017	Atalanta	0	(0)
2013–2014	→ RKC Waalwijk (loan)	20	(0)
2014–2015	→ Rio Ave (loan)	27	(0)
2015–2016	→ Bolton Wanderers (loan)	19	(0)
2016	→ Gaziantepspor (loan)	12	(0)
2016–2017	→ Vitória Guimarães (loan)	9	(0)
2017–2021	Amiens	65	(1)

International career^{‡}
2010–2011	France U18	6	(1)
2011–2012	France U19	5	(1)
2012	France U20	2	(0)
- * Club domestic league appearances and goals as of 16 November 2019 ‡ National team caps and goals as of 9 September 2012

Prince Désiré Gnahoré Gouano (born 24 December 1993), known as Prince-Désir Gouano, is a French professional footballer who plays as a defender. He primarily plays as a centre-back in a four or three man back-line.

== Club career ==
=== Le Havre ===
Born in Paris, Gouano began his career with the CFF Paris youth academy. In 2007, he was transferred to Le Havre at the age of 14. At Le Havre, he worked his way through the club's youth academy until 2010, when he joined his team's B squad. Gouano went on to make 12 CFA appearances in Group A of the 2010–11 season, prior to earning his debut for the first team. On 27 May 2011, he made his professional debut with Le Havre's senior team in a league match against Metz. That would ultimately prove to be his first and only first team appearance for the French outfit, prior to his transfer to Italian champions, Juventus in the summer of 2011.

=== Juventus ===
On 31 July 2011, Gouano was officially transferred to Juventus, where he was enlisted into the club's Primavera youth team, where he was a first team regular in the side that won 2012 Viareggio Tournament. Gouano was promoted from the youth academy ahead of the 2012–13 Serie A campaign, though he was loaned out to Serie B outfit, Virtus Lanciano on 29 August 2012. He was joined by fellow Juventus loanee Nicola Leali just two days later. During his loan spell with the newly promoted Serie B side, Gouano made just 1 first-team appearance, a 0–3 home loss to Bari on 17 November 2012, after spending much of his time with the club's youth squad. Juventus recalled the player during the January transfer window and loaned him to fellow Serie B side Vicenza Calcio in a multi-player part-exchange deal. On 25 August 2013, it was announced that Gouano was again sent on loan at Dutch side RKC Waalwijk for the remainder of the season.

=== Atalanta ===
On 2 September 2013, it was announced that Gouano was transferred from Juventus to Atalanta, along with Edoardo Ceria, as part of the deal that Juve signed Luca Barlocco. On 10 September 2013, it was announced that Gouano would still be sent on loan at Dutch side RKC Waalwijk for the remainder of the season.

In June 2014, Atalanta acquired Gouano outright by selling James Troisi back to Juventus.

==== Bolton Wanderers (loan) ====
Gouano signed for Bolton Wanderers on 6 August 2015.

=== Amiens ===
On 2 July 2017, Atalanta announced that the club had sold Gouano to Ligue 1 newcomer Amiens SC.

== International career ==
Gouano is a France youth international, having earned caps at under-18 and under-19 level.

== Career statistics ==
=== Club ===
As of match played 10 November 2019

Appearances and goals by club, season and competition
Club	Season	League			National Cup		League Cup		Europe		Other		Total	
Club	Season	Division	Apps	Goals	Apps	Goals	Apps	Goals	Apps	Goals	Apps	Goals	Apps	Goals
Le Havre	2010–11	Ligue 2	1	0	0	0	0	0	—		—		1	0
Le Havre	2011–12	Ligue 2	0	0	0	0	1	0	—		—		1	0
Le Havre	Total		1	0	0	0	1	0	0	0	0	0	2	0
Juventus	2012–13	Serie A	0	0	0	0	—		0	0	0	0	0	0
Virtus Lanciano (loan)	2012–13	Serie B	1	0	0	0	—		—		—		1	0
Atalanta	2013–14	Serie A	0	0	0	0	—		—		—		0	0
RKC Waalwijk (loan)	2013–14	Eredivisie	20	0	0	0	—		—		4 (Note: Appearances in the Eredivisie relegation play-offs)	0	24	0
Rio Ave (loan)	2014–15	Primeira Liga	27	0	2	0	2	0	8 (Note: Appearances in the Europa League)	0	1 (Note: Appearance in the Supertaça)	0	40	0
Bolton (loan)	2015–16	Championship	19	0	0	0	0	0	—		—		19	0
Gaziantepspor (loan)	2015–16	Süper Lig	12	0	0	0	—		—		—		12	0
Vitória de Guimarães (loan)	2016–17	Primeira Liga	9	0	2	0	2	0	—		—		13	0
Amiens	2017–18	Ligue 1	32	0	0	0	2	0	—		—		34	0
Amiens	2018–19	Ligue 1	30	1	0	0	2	0	—		—		32	1
Amiens	2019–20	Ligue 1	3	0	0	0	0	0	—		—		3	0
Amiens	Total		65	1	0	0	4	0	0	0	0	0	69	1
Career total			154	1	4	0	9	0	8	0	5	0	180	1

== Honours ==
Juventus

- Viareggio Tournament: 2012
- Supercoppa Italiana: 2012
