= Khaled Adénon =

Beninese footballer (born 1985)

Personal information
- Full name: Abdoul Khaled Akiola Adénon
- Date of birth: 29 July 1985 (age 41)
- Place of birth: Abidjan, Ivory Coast
- Height: 1.81 m (5 ft 11 in)
- Position: Defender

Senior career*
Years	Team	Apps	(Gls)
2005–2007	ASEC Mimosas	36	(0)
2008–2013	Le Mans	68	(2)
2009–2010	→ Bastia (loan)	28	(1)
2010	Le Mans B	1	(0)
2014–2015	Luçon	30	(1)
2015–2019	Amiens	115	(4)
2019–2020	Al-Wehda	1	(0)
2020–2021	Avranches	21	(1)
2021–2023	Doxa Katokopias	60	(2)
2024	Doxa Katokopias	4	(0)

International career^{‡}
2006–2023	Benin	86	(2)
- * Club domestic league appearances and goals as of 27 May 2024 ‡ National team caps and goals as of 17 June 2023

Abdoul Khaled Akiola Adénon (born 29 July 1985) is a professional footballer who last played as a defender for Cypriot First Division club Doxa Katokopias. Born in Ivory Coast, he represented Benin at international level.

== Club career ==
Adénon was born in Abidjan, Ivory Coast. He started his career with Ivorian side ASEC Mimosas, moving to France with Le Mans FC in 2008. He made his senior debut with Le Mans in a Ligue 1 match against AS Nancy on 19 October 2008. He joined Ligue 2 side SC Bastia on loan for the 2009–10 season on 3 July 2009. He returned to Le Mans at the end of the loan, and went on to complete 68 Ligue 1 and Ligue 2 appearances for the club.

On 10 June 2012, Adénon was sent off during a 2014 World Cup qualifier against Rwanda for assaulting the referee. That August, FIFA suspended him from all competition for a year.

With Le Mans bankrupt at the end of the 2012–13 Ligue 2 season, Adénon was effectively a free agent when his ban expired, and in July 2014 he joined Vendée Luçon Football. A year later he was signed by Amiens SC. He was a regular in the team which saw back-to-back promotions in 2015–16 and 2016–17.

Despite signing a new two-year deal with Amiens SC in the summer of 2018, Adénon signed for Saudi Arabian club Al-Wehda in July 2019, agreeing a two-year contract. He left by mutual consent in February 2020.

In July 2020, Adénon returned to France with US Avranches, re-uniting with manager Frédéric Reculeau, who had given him a chance at Luçon.

On 16 August 2021, he signed with Doxa Katokopias in Cyprus.

== International career ==
Adénon represented his homeland at 2008 Africa Cup of Nations.

He played on the successful 2019 Africa Cup of Nations when the team advanced to the quarterfinals.

== Career statistics ==
As of match played 12 June 2016
Scores and results list Benin's goal tally first, score column indicates score after each Adénon goal.

List of international goals scored by Khaled Adénon
No.	Date	Venue	Cap	Opponent	Score	Result	Competition
1	7 September 2008	Stade de l'Amitié, Cotonou, Benin	15	Angola	1–0	3–2	2010 FIFA World Cup qualification
2	12 June 2016	Stade de l'Amitié, Cotonou, Benin	48	Equatorial Guinea	1–0	2–1	2017 Africa Cup of Nations qualification
