= Seybou Koita =

Nigerien footballer

Personal information
- Date of birth: 15 April 1994 (age 32)
- Place of birth: Niamey, Niger
- Height: 1.80 m (5 ft 11 in)
- Position: Forward

Senior career*
Years	Team	Apps	(Gls)
2013–2015	Orléans	8	(0)
2015–2016	Hapoel Ashkelon	10	(1)
2017–2019	Amiens B	24	(5)
2017–2019	Amiens	8	(1)
2019	Ashdod	6	(0)
2019–2021	Red Star	22	(4)
2021–2022	Andrézieux	14	(4)
2023	Oman Club	0	(0)

International career
2019–2023	Niger	10	(0)
- * Club domestic league appearances and goals as of 02:10, 25 March 2022 (UTC)

Seybou Koita (born 15 April 1994) is a Nigerien professional footballer who last played as a forward for Oman Elite League club Oman Club and the Niger national team.

== Club career ==
Koita arrived in France aged 5, but did not start playing football until much later. He first played for a club in Neuilly-sur-Seine, where he was solicited by a number of professional clubs. He signed for Orléans and within two years was rewarded with a professional contract. He made his debut for the club in the Championnat National game against Amiens SC on 16 August 2013, when he came on as a stoppage time substitute. Injury kept him out of most of the season, and when Orléans were promoted to Ligue 2 he found himself fifth choice, so did not get much game time. His full debut came on 22 May 2015 in a 1–0 win over Sochaux, the only start of his Orléans career. At the end of the 2014–15 Ligue 2 season, Orléans were relegated, and Koita left the club and signed for Hapoel Ashkelon of the Israeli Liga Leumit (second tier).

A foot injury, and visa issues, cut short his stay in Israel, and he spent time training with Red Star and trialling with Dunkerque before signing a six-month professional contract with Amiens SC in December 2016. In July 2017 he extended his contract with the club for a further two years.

Koita left Amiens in January 2019 and spent more time in Israel during the second half of the 2018–19 season, with Ashdod. In September 2019 he returned to France with Red Star.

== International career ==
Koita made his debut for the Niger national team on 23 March 2019 in an Africa Cup qualifier against Egypt, as a 67th-minute substitute for Issa Modibo Sidibé.

== Personal life ==
Koita holds dual Niger-Mali nationality.

== Career statistics ==
As of 7 July 2021

Appearances and goals by club, season and competition
Club	Season	League			National Cup		League Cup		Other		Total	
Club	Season	Division	Apps	Goals	Apps	Goals	Apps	Goals	Apps	Goals	Apps	Goals
Orléans	2013–14	National	3	0	0	0	0	0	—		3	0
Orléans	2014–15	Ligue 2	5	0	0	0	0	0	—		5	0
Orléans	Total		8	0	0	0	0	0	0	0	8	0
Hapoel Ashkelon	2015–16	Ligat HaAl	10	1	3	1	0	0	—		13	2
Amiens	2016–17	Ligue 2	2	1	0	0	0	0	—		2	1
Amiens	2017–18	Ligue 1	6	0	1	0	1	1	—		8	1
Amiens	Total		8	1	1	0	1	1	0	0	10	2
Amiens II	2016–17	CFA 2	9	2	—		—		—		9	2
Amiens II	2017–18	National 3	12	1	—		—		—		12	1
Amiens II	2018–19	National 3	3	2	—		—		—		3	2
Amiens II	Total		24	5	0	0	0	0	0	0	24	5
Ashdod	2018–19	Israeli Premier League	6	0	1	0	—		0	0	7	0
Red Star	2019–20	National	10	2	3	1	0	0	0	0	13	3
Red Star	2020–21	National	12	2	1	0	—		—		13	2
Red Star	Total		22	4	4	1	0	0	0	0	26	5
Career total			78	11	9	2	1	1	0	0	88	14
