= Olof Lundh =

Swedish sports journalist (born 1966)

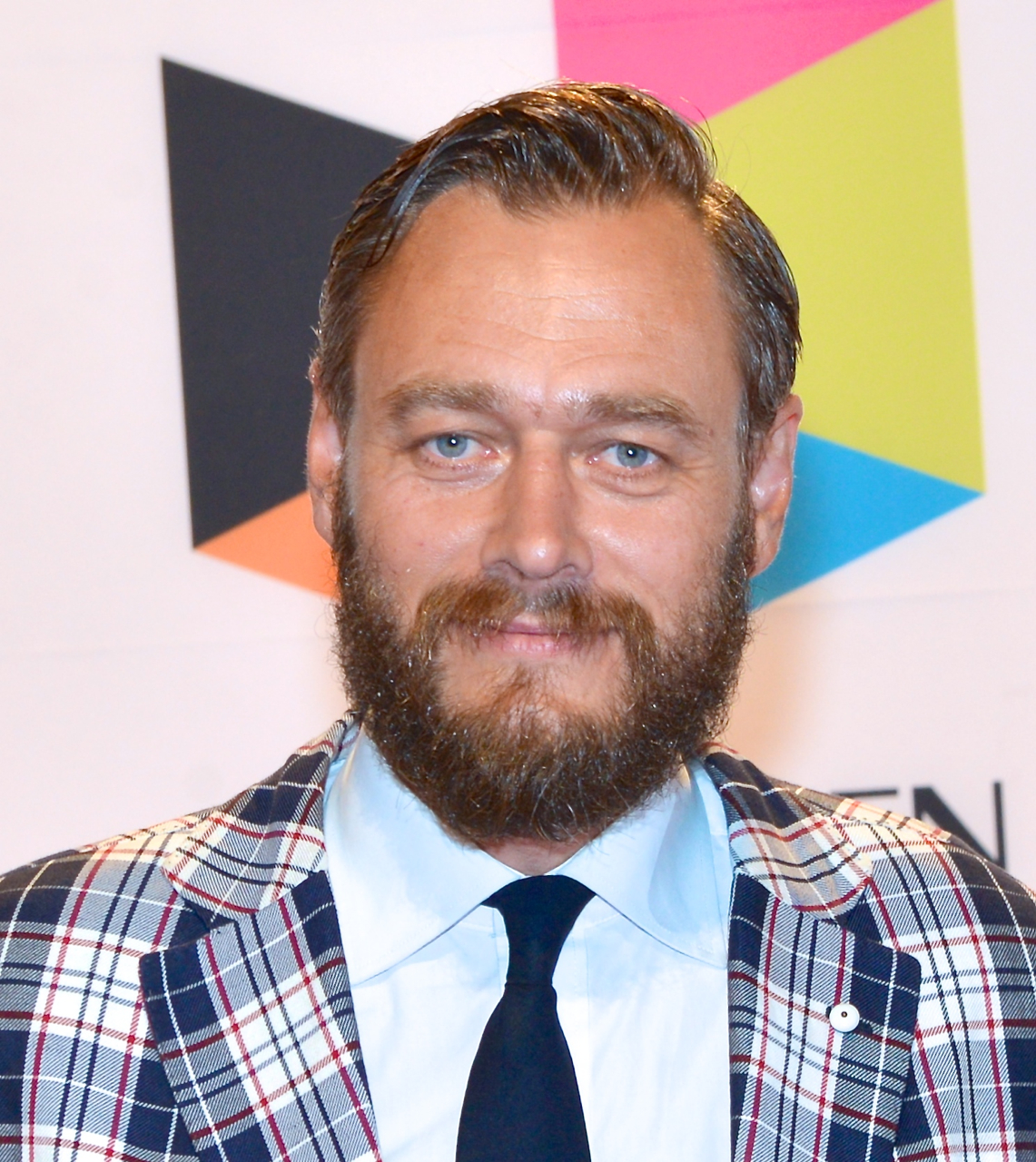
- Olof Lundh in August 2013
- Born: Karl Olof Lundh; 15 October 1966 (age 59)
- Occupation: sports journalist
- Known for: association football-reports

Karl Olof Lundh (born 16 October 1966) is a Swedish sports journalist focusing on reporting on football for TV4.

== Career ==
Lundh was involved in the starting of the site fotbollskanalen.se in late 2006, and has been the Publisher of the site between 2008 and 2013. The site is fully owned by TV4. Lundh participates in several of TV4:s different football broadcasts, like Fotbollskanalen Europe, where he between 2014 and 2015 has been the reporter for Premier League and Europa League. He also works with the broadcasts of the Sweden men's national football team games during the UEFA Euro and FIFA World Cup qualifiers. and has been part of broadcasts from Euro 2008, 2012 and 2009, 2015 for U21s and 2013 for women and World Cups for men 2010 and 2014 and for women 2011 and 2015.

In 2014, Lundh became a nominee for the television award Kristallen. Along with Patrick Ekwall Lundh presented the interview show Ekwall vs Lundh during 2007 until 2012. Olof Lundh worked at Expressen between 1996 and 1997 and 2001–06 and he was also as a correspondent in New York City for Expressen 2002-04 and worked for Göteborgs-Posten between 1997 and 2001. His first work as a football reporter was for Expressen.
