= Gaoussou Traoré =

Malian–French footballer (born 1999)

Personal information
- Full name: Gaoussou Boubacar Traoré
- Date of birth: 4 December 1999 (age 26)
- Place of birth: Amiens, France
- Height: 1.78 m (5 ft 10 in)
- Position: Midfielder

Team information
- Current team: Châteauroux
- Number: 25

Youth career
- 2006–2007: RC Amiénois
- 2007–2018: Amiens

Senior career*
Years	Team	Apps	(Gls)
2017–2023	Amiens II	28	(0)
2018–2023	Amiens	14	(0)
2019–2020	→ Quevilly-Rouen (loan)	19	(0)
2019–2020	→ Quevilly-Rouen B (loan)	3	(1)
2022–2023	→ Concarneau (loan)	32	(5)
2023	Radnički Niš	3	(0)
2024	Versailles	10	(0)
2024–2025	CS Sfaxien	17	(1)
2026–	Châteauroux	4	(0)
- * Club domestic league appearances and goals as of 23 June 2026

Gaoussou Traoré (born 4 December 1999) is a French professional footballer who plays as a midfielder for Championnat National 1 club Châteauroux.

== Club career ==
Traoré is a youth product of Amiens SC, joining their academy from his local side RC Amiénois. On 19 February 2018, Traoré signed a one-year trainee contract with the club. He made his professional debut for Amiens in a 2–0 Ligue 1 loss to Olympique Lyonnais on 12 August 2018.

On 18 June 2019, Traoré was loaned out to US Quevilly-Rouen for the 2019–20 season. On 30 June 2022, he was loaned to Concarneau.

In August 2024, Traoré signed a 2-year contract with Tunisian Ligue Professionnelle 1 club CS Sfaxien. On 1 September 2024, he made his first appearance for the club coming off the bench in the 37th minute and scored the only goal of his career at the club in the 88th minute in a 2–2 away draw against recently promoted AS Gabès.

== Personal life ==
Traoré was born in Amiens, France. He holds French and Malian nationalities.
