= Malian nationality law =

Malian Personal and Family Code

National Assembly of Mali
- Long title: Code des personnes et de la famille malienne — Titre V: De la Nationalité, Loi N° 2011–087 du 30 Décembre 2011
- Enacted by: Government of Mali
- Status: Current legislation

Malian nationality law is regulated by the Constitution of Mali, as amended; the Personal and Family Code, and its revisions; and various international agreements to which the country is a signatory. These laws determine who is, or is eligible to be, a national of Mali. The legal means to acquire nationality, formal legal membership in a nation, differ from the domestic relationship of rights and obligations between a national and the nation, known as citizenship. Nationality describes the relationship of an individual to the state under international law, whereas citizenship is the domestic relationship of an individual within the nation. Malian nationality is typically obtained under the jus sanguinis, i.e. by birth in Mali or abroad to parents with Malian nationality. It can be granted to persons with an affiliation to the country, or to a permanent resident who has lived in the country for a given period of time through naturalization.

== Acquisition of nationality ==
Nationality can be acquired in Mali at birth or later in life through naturalization.

=== By birth ===
Malian law makes distinction of whether a child is born in or out of wedlock. Children born legitimately within a marriage automatically acquire nationality at birth; whereas, children born illegitimately must follow an administrative procedure during their minority to confirm their filiation to their parent. Upon attaining majority, children may repudiate nationality bestowed at birth. Those who acquire nationality at birth include:

- Children born in Mali to at least one parent also born in Mali, who had original nationality from an African state;
- Children born abroad to at least one parent who was born in Mali and has Malian nationality; or
- Children or newborn foundlings born in the country whose parents are unknown.

=== By naturalization ===
Naturalization can be granted to persons who have resided in the territory for a sufficient period of time to confirm they understand the customs and traditions of Mali and are integrated into the society. General provisions are that applicants have good character and conduct; are in good mental health; and have no criminal record which resulted in a sentence exceeding one year. Applicants must typically have resided in the country for ten years. Besides foreigners meeting the criteria, other persons who may be naturalized include:

- Children legally adopted by a Malian parent, at the time of completion of a legal adoption automatically derive Malian nationality;
- Minor children may automatically naturalize when their parent acquires nationality;
- Children born in the territory to foreign nationals may naturalize within six months prior to reaching the age of majority after a five-year residency; or
- The foreign or stateless spouse of a Malian national;
- Foreign parents (but not those who are stateless), provided they have resided in the country for one year, may acquire nationality if they have a child who has Malian nationality; or
- Persons who have performed exceptional service to the nation may naturalize after a five-year residency period.

== Loss of nationality ==
Malian nationals can renounce their nationality pending approval by the state. Malians of origin may lose their nationality for committing crimes against state interests. Naturalized persons may be denaturalized in Mali for failing to complete military service; disloyalty to the state; committing crimes against the state or state security; ordinary crimes; or for fraud, misrepresentation, or concealment in a naturalization petition. Persons who previously had nationality and wish to repatriate must request reinstatement, which is discretionary.

== Dual nationality ==
Since 1995, Mali has allowed nationals to hold dual nationality.

== History ==
After the collapse of the Ghana Empire around 1100, the Mali Kingdom gained its independence. Initially, as small kingdom, it was conquered by the Sosso Empire in the twelfth century, but gained its independence in 1230. For the next four years, Mali began an expansion campaign forming alliances to take over the trans-Saharan trade routes and defeat the Sosso Empire in 1234. Forming a federation, with its allies Mali controlled the gold trade in the region. Social and political organization was based upon allegiance, within geographic spheres of influence and linked networks of lineages, kinship and slaves. Slave labor was used to produce food, and lacking kinship ties, were prized for their loyalty as royal administrators and soldiers. In 1542, the Songhai Empire, formerly one of the states in the Mali Empire, invaded the capital city, but were unable to subjugate the Mali rulers. After briefly leaving the capital, the Mali rulers returned but the empire was in decline. The Songhai expanded from their stronghold at Gao, capturing territory which stretched from Nioro du Sahel in the west to Agadez (now in Niger) on the east in the northern part of present day Mali. In 1591, Ahmad al-Mansur, the Sultan of Morocco conquered the Songhai Empire to expand both Islam and his economic empire.

=== African empires and outsider contact (1591–1890) ===
The Moroccans imposed a regime of suppression and violence, forcing the Songhai to labor and work on projects to develop infrastructure, like the building of roads and a citadel. Despite revolts and a protracted period of conflict, Morocco retained control of the surrounding area until it was defeated in 1737. Around 1650, the remaining territory over which the Mali kings had ruled was overtaken by the Bambara Empire. The Bambara kingdom of Ségu, controlled territory in the west near Ségou and the kingdom of Kaarta flourished around Nioro du Sahel. Both of these kingdoms were defeated by the Massina Empire in 1818, a theocratic state which remained in power until 1862.

In 1828, French explorer René Caillié visited Timbuktu igniting French interest in the area. To extend their trade in the region from their base in Senegal, French traders expanded into the territory. Between 1850 and 1864, Omar Saidou Tall (also known as Umar Tal) led raids into the area destroying much of the remaining African kingdoms. Initially French traders accepted Tall's rule in the Toucouleur Empire, but in 1855 when Tall attacked their trading stronghold on the Senegal River. The move prompted the French to retaliate and attempt to subdue the weak and divided Toucouleur Empire. In 1883, they began an occupation at Bamako and expanded their campaign to the south, gaining control of important urban centers. Over the next decade France would continue its expansion of territory. In 1890, it established a protectorate over most of the region.

=== French period (1890–1960) ===
In 1892, the protectorate was officially made the colony of French Sudan. Timbuktu was conquered in 1894 and the remaining territory that makes up present-day Mali was annexed by 1898. In 1895, the French established the administration system that would govern its possessions in French West Africa for the next sixty years. A Governor-General was installed and a headquarters was founded in Dakar, in the Colony of Senegal. The Governor-General's authority was extended to Senegal, French Guinea, and the Ivory Coast colonies, and in 1899 to Dahomey and French Sudan. Under Article 109 of the French Constitution of 1848, French territories were to be governed by specific laws until the constitution was extended there. This provision laid the groundwork for nationality legislation based upon whether the native inhabitants were able to be assimilated by adopting European standards. From 1848, those persons who settled in the colonies and were from France were considered nationals who had full rights and were subject to French law. However, those born in the new territories were considered to be nationals without citizenship. Nationals in the older colonies of the Antilles, Guiana, Réunion and parts of India and Senegal were granted political rights, but those in new colonies were confirmed by a decree on 14 July 1865 to be subjects and not citizens, unless they renounced their allegiance to native custom and possessed sufficient understanding of the obligations of citizenship.

Also in 1848, slavery was abolished throughout the French Empire and the Civil Code was extended to all of the French citizens in the colonies. Under the Civil Code, women were legally incapacitated and paternal authority was established over their children. Upon marriage, a woman married to a French man automatically acquired the same nationality as her spouse. Illegitimate children were barred from inheritance and nationality could only be transmitted through a father. Non-citizen nationals were governed by traditional laws concerning marriage and inheritance which placed the well-being of the community above individual rights. These laws prevented a wife from being treated as a slave, required her husband to support her, and entitled her kin to a bride price, to compensate them for the loss of her fertility to their kinship group and secure the legality of the union. Having paid the price for the marriage contract, she and her offspring belonged to the kinship network of her husband and could be inherited if her husband died.

The French Nationality Law of 1889 codified previous statutory laws, changing the French standard from jus sanguinis to jus soli and was extended to the French West Indies. Under its terms, women who would become stateless by the rule to acquire their spouse's nationality were allowed to retain their French nationality upon marriage. The Nationality Law was modified in 1897 when it was extended to the remainder of the French colonies. Clarification in the 1897 decree included that bestowing nationality by birth in French territory only applied to children born in France, restoring descent requirements for the colonies. Under the Code de l'indigénat (Code of Indigenous Status) promulgated for Algeria in 1881 and extended to French West Africa in 1904, nationals in the new colonies followed customary law. The French West African Federation had been founded that year with the existing five colonies, of Dahomey, Guinea, Ivory Coast, Senegal, and French Sudan, and was later expanded to include Mauritania, Niger, and Upper Volta.

On 25 May 1912, a Décret N°. 27892 was issued specifically addressing the status of French West Africans. Under its terms, African subjects could acquire French citizenship if at the age of majority and having proved three years of established domicile in the territory, they were able to read and write French; they were of good character and assimilated to French culture, or they engaged in a public or private French enterprise for a minimum or ten years; and they had sufficient means of self-support. The language requirement could be waived for those who had received military medals or recognition of the Legion of Honor or were in the French civil service. Upon application, subjects were required to acknowledge that they gave up their personal status under customary law and were to be governed by French laws. The decree noted that married women and minor children acquired the status of their husband or father however, this was only the case if the marriage had been conducted under French law, rather than customary practice.

Following the end of World War I France passed a law, "Décret N°. 24 on 25 March 1915 that allowed subjects or protected persons who were non-citizen nationals and had established domicile in a French territory to acquire full citizenship, including the naturalization of their wives and minor children, by having received the cross of the Legion of Honor, having obtained a university degree, having rendered service to the nation, having attained the rank of an officer or received a medal from the French army, who had married a Frenchwoman and established a one year residency; or who had resided for more than ten years in a colony other than their country of origin. A 1918 decree written for French West Africa was aimed at decorated veterans of the war and their families, providing they had not previously been denied their rights nor participated in actions against French rule.

In 1927, France passed a new Nationality Law, which under Article 8, removed the requirement for married women to automatically derive the nationality of a husband and provided that her nationality could only be changed if she consented to change her nationality. It also allowed children born in France to native-born French women married to foreigners to acquire their nationality from their mothers. When it was implemented it included Guadeloupe, Martinique and Réunion but was extended to the remaining French possessions for French citizens only in 1928. Under Article 26 of the 1928 decree was the stipulation that it did not apply to natives of the French possessions except Algeria, Guadeloupe, Martinique, and Réunion. Between 1933 and 1947, the territory of Upper Volta was divided up and incorporated into the colonies of French Sudan, the Ivory Coast, and Niger. This was done to facilitate development of infrastructure projects and make the colonies more economically sound. Simultaneously, laborers were exported from French Sudan to work plantations in Ivory Coast and Senegal. In 1938, the legal incapacity of married women was finally invalidated for French citizens. In 1939, France determined that marriage and inheritance were too significant to continue being dealt with in native courts. That year, the Mandel Decree was enacted in French West Africa as well as French Equatorial Africa. Under its terms child marriage was discouraged. It established the minimum age at marriage as fourteen for women and sixteen for men, invalidated marriages wherein spouses did not consent, and nullified levirate marriage without approval of the woman.

At the end of World War II, a statute issued on 7 March 1944 granted French citizenship to those who had performed services to the nation, such as serving as civil servants or receiving recognitions. The Constitution of 1946 granted French citizenship to all subjects of France's territories without having to renounce their personal status as natives. In 1945, a new Code of French Nationality was passed, which conferred once again automatic French nationality on foreign wives of French men, but allowed mothers who were French nationals to pass their nationality to children born outside of France. It expressly applied to Algeria, French Guiana, Guadeloupe, Martinique and Réunion and was extended to the Overseas Territories in 1953, but in the case of the latter had distinctions for the rights of those who were naturalized. In 1951 the Jacquinot Decree strengthened the provisions in French West and Equatorial Africa of the Mandel decree removing women who were twenty-one years old, or divorced, from control by a father or guardian and establishing specific rules for the payment and determining the amount of a bride price.

The legal framework of French Sudan was changed by the Loi-cadre Defferre issued on 23 June 1956, which granted internal self-governance and universal suffrage to French territories and expanded their Territorial Assemblies. These changes led to an increase in political activity and a press for the dissolution of the Federation of French West Africa. The elections held that year led to Modibo Keita, a Marxist and anti-colonial activist who would later become Mali's first president, being elected to the territorial legislature and the French National Assembly. With the passage of the 1958 French Constitution, nationality provisions were standardized for France, Overseas Departments, and Overseas Territories. Article 86 excluded the possibility for independence of the colonies, but allowed them to become autonomous republics. The French Constitution was amended in 1960 to allow states to maintain membership in the Community even if they were independent republics. When Keita's attempt for French Sudan to form a Pan-African federation with Dahomey, Ivory Coast, Senegal, and Upper Volta, failed the country opted for independence.

=== Post-independence (1960–present) ===
French Sudan gained its independence on 22 September 1960, renaming the country the Republic of Mali. Natives of Mali who had not opted to retain French nationality were conferred Malian nationality at independence. Those who had resided in the territory for at least two years prior to independence were able to individually apply for nationality. Because of low birth registrations, especially in rural areas, many persons did not have the necessary documentation to prove that they were Malian and became stateless, as France required those who were ineligible for Malian nationality to specifically choose to remain French. Mali wrote its first nationality code (Loi No. 62-18 AN-RM) after independence in 1962. It closely followed the French Nationality Code of 1945, granting automatic nationality to those born in the territory to persons who had also been born in Mali and were of African descent. It allowed those born in Mali to foreign parents to acquire nationality through a declaration process, if they had resided in Mali for five years. To address the problems of statelessness created at independence the Nationality Code conferred blanket nationality all habitual residents in Mali at the time the code became effective and stipulated that proof of residence could be obtained from any government official.

Under terms of the 1962 Code, children born abroad derived nationality through their father. Children born to a Malian mother and foreign father had to follow an administrative process to confirm that the child did not obtain its father's nationality or cultural indoctrination before being granted Malian nationality. Children born outside of wedlock had to prove a filiation to a Malian parent and those who acquired nationality through adoption could only do so through their Malian father. Women who married Malian men automatically acquired the nationality of their spouse, unless they refused, or the government refused to grant them Malian status, but foreign husbands of Malian women could only naturalize after a two-year residency. It provided nationality for foundlings discovered in Mali, but if the parents were later discovered and determined not to be Malian, nationality could be revoked. Five years of residency was required to attain naturalization.

The Nationality Code was amended (Loi No. 95-70) in 1995 to allow Malians to hold multiple nationalities. It also made minor revision to wording and eliminated some of the gender restrictions for women to pass on nationality to their children, based on agreements in the ratification of the Convention on the Elimination of All Forms of Discrimination Against Women. In 2002, legislation for the protection of children, granted the right to identity and nationality to children in Mali. The Committee on the Rights of the Child pressed for the government to make additional changes to provide greater access to registration for nomadic persons in the country. In 2005, Mali became a signatory to the Maputo Protocol of the African Charter on Human and Peoples' Rights, which guarantees women's rights in Africa. Women's groups began pressing for changes to the family code and nationality laws, leading the government to began a redrafting program in 2009. Though the law was passed by the National Assembly that year, opposition from Muslim leaders prevented it going into effect until 2011.

The 2011 Personal and Family Code (Code des personnes et de la famille) contains provisions for nationality in Title V. Though based on the 1962 model, it removed some of the racial and gender discrimination in the previous law. It allowed children born legitimately to acquire nationality equally from mothers or fathers. It also allowed adopted children and spouses to obtain nationality without gender restrictions for mothers and wives. The Code retained provisions requiring illegitimate children to prove a relationship with their parents, stipulating that the administrative process must take place while the child is a minor, or they might become stateless. Because the rules on legitimacy and marriage are based on Sharia principles, children born of adulterous or incestual relationships may not be recognized, unless the parents subsequently marry.
