= Sanasi Sy =

French footballer (born 1999)

Personal information
- Full name: Sanasi Mahamadou Sy
- Date of birth: 4 April 1999 (age 27)
- Place of birth: Paris, France
- Height: 1.84 m (6 ft 0 in)
- Position: Left-back

Team information
- Current team: Krumovgrad
- Number: 18

Youth career
- 2013–2016: Paris FC
- 2016–2019: Amiens

Senior career*
Years	Team	Apps	(Gls)
2017–2021	Amiens II	14	(1)
2019–2021	Amiens	8	(0)
2019–2020	→ Tubize (loan)	5	(0)
2020–2023	Salernitana	1	(0)
2021–2022	→ Cosenza (loan)	17	(0)
2023–2024	Nîmes	14	(0)
2025–	Krumovgrad	8	(0)
- * Club domestic league appearances and goals as of 26 June 2025

Sanasi Mahamadou Sy (born 4 April 1999) is a French professional footballer who plays as a left-back for Bulgarian First League club Krumovgrad.

== Career ==
On 6 September 2018, Sy signed his first professional contract with Amiens SC. He made his professional debut for Amiens in a 1–0 Coupe de France win over Valenciennes FC on 5 January 2019. In January 2019, he was loaned to Tubize until the end of the season.

On 19 January 2021, Sy signed with Serie B club Salernitana until 2024.

On 20 August 2021, he went to Cosenza on loan.

On 31 January 2023, Sy returned to France and joined Nîmes.

In January 2025, he moved to Bulgarian First League club Krumovgrad.

== Personal life ==
Sy was born in Paris to a Senegalese father and Malian mother. He has French nationality.
