= Rafał Kurzawa =

Polish footballer

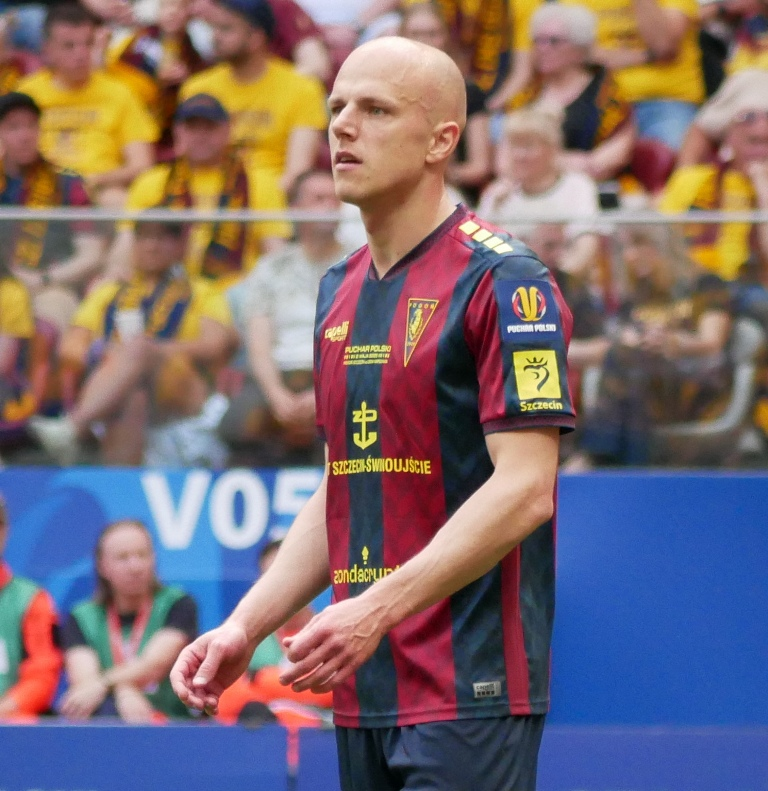
- Kurzawa with Pogoń Szczecin in 2025

Personal information
- Full name: Rafał Maciej Kurzawa
- Date of birth: 29 January 1993 (age 33)
- Place of birth: Wieruszów, Poland
- Height: 1.82 m (6 ft 0 in)
- Position: Left winger

Team information
- Current team: Bruk-Bet Termalica
- Number: 8

Youth career
- 2005–2006: Sokół Świba
- 2006–2010: Marcinki Kępno
- 2010–2011: Górnik Zabrze

Senior career*
| Years | Team | Apps | (Gls) |
| 2011–2018 | Górnik Zabrze | 109 | (7) |
| 2012–2013 | → ROW 1964 Rybnik (loan) | 49 | (4) |
| 2014–2016 | → Górnik Zabrze II | 31 | (5) |
| 2018–2020 | Amiens | 11 | (1) |
| 2019 | → FC Midtjylland (loan) | 7 | (1) |
| 2020 | → Esbjerg fB (loan) | 12 | (2) |
| 2021–2025 | Pogoń Szczecin | 103 | (5) |
| 2022 | Pogoń Szczecin II | 2 | (0) |
| 2025– | Bruk-Bet Termalica | 24 | (4) |

International career
| 2017–2018 | Poland | 7 | (0) |
- * Club domestic league appearances and goals as of 00:15, 24 May 2026 (UTC)

Rafał Maciej Kurzawa ([ˈrafaw kuˈʐava]; born 29 January 1993) is a Polish professional footballer who plays as a left winger for I liga club Bruk-Bet Termalica.

== Club career ==
On 31 January 2019, Kurzawa was loaned out to Danish Superliga club FC Midtjylland for six months. He returned to Amiens SC in the summer 2019, but did not take part in any games for the club, before being loaned out to another Danish club Esbjerg fB on 26 January 2020 for the rest of the season. Returning to Amiens in summer 2020, his contract was terminated by mutual agreement on 6 October.

== International career ==
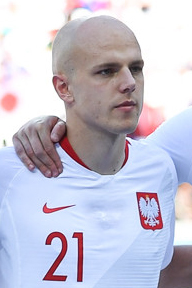
Kurzawa lining up for Poland at the 2018 FIFA World Cup

Kurzawa debuted in a friendly match against Mexico alongside Tomasz Kędziora on 13 November 2017.

In June 2018, Kurzawa was named in the Poland national team's final 23-man squad for the 2018 FIFA World Cup in Russia.

== Career statistics ==
=== International ===
Appearances and goals by national team and year
| National team | Year | Apps | Goals |
|---|---|---|---|
Poland
| Poland | 2017 | 1 | 0 |
| Poland | 2018 | 6 | 0 |
| Total | | 7 | 0 |

== Honours ==
ROW Rybnik

- II liga West: 2012–13

Midtjylland

- Danish Cup: 2018–19

Individual

- Ekstraklasa Midfielder of the Season: 2017–18
