= Cheick Timité =

Ivorian footballer

Personal information
- Full name: Cheick Aymar Timité
- Date of birth: 20 November 1997 (age 28)
- Place of birth: Abidjan, Ivory Coast
- Height: 1.80 m (5 ft 11 in)
- Positions: Winger; forward

Team information
- Current team: Al-Arabi
- Number: 20

Youth career
- 2013–2014: ES Nanterre
- 2014–2016: Ajaccio

Senior career*
Years	Team	Apps	(Gls)
2015–2016	Ajaccio II	8	(2)
2016	Ajaccio	1	(0)
2016–2017	Amiens II	22	(9)
2017–2021	Amiens	59	(5)
2017–2018	→ Dunkerque (loan)	21	(6)
2019–2020	→ Paris FC (loan)	17	(1)
2021–2022	Fuenlabrada	5	(0)
2022	Valenciennes	8	(0)
2023–2024	Ho Chi Minh City	16	(6)
2025–2026	Becamex Binh Duong	9	(0)
2026–	Al-Arabi	0	(0)

International career^{‡}
2019	Ivory Coast U23	5	(1)
2021	Ivory Coast Olympic	3	(0)
- * Club domestic league appearances and goals as of 15:55, 1 October 2023 (UTC) ‡ National team caps and goals as of 31 July 2021

Cheick Aymar Timité (born 20 November 1997) is an Ivorian professional footballer who plays as a winger or forward for Al-Arabi.

== Club career ==
Timité began playing football at the age of 15 with ES Nanterre before moving to Ajaccio's youth academy. He debuted with Ajaccio in a 0–0 Ligue 2 tie with Auxerre on 19 February 2016. Timité joined Amiens in 2016. Due to legal issues regarding his transfer, he could not play for Amiens in his first year and was loaned to USL Dunkerque for the 2017–18 season.

On 31 August 2021, Timité moved to Spain and joined Segunda División side CF Fuenlabrada on a one-year deal. The following 31 January, after just one start in seven matches overall, he terminated his contract. On the same day, Timité signed with Valenciennes until the end of the season.

On 30 September 2023, Timité signed a one-year contract with V.League 1 club Ho Chi Minh City.

== International career ==
Timité debuted for the Ivory Coast U23s in a pair of 2019 Africa U-23 Cup of Nations qualification matches in March 2019.

== Honours ==
Ivory Coast U23

- Africa U-23 Cup of Nations: runner-up 2019
