= 2023–24 Amiens SC season =

Amiens SC
2023–24 season
- Chairman: Bernard Joannin
- Manager: Omar Daf
- Stadium: Stade de la Licorne
- Ligue 2: 8th
- Coupe de France: Round of 64
- Top goalscorer: League: Louis Mafouta (13); All: Louis Mafouta (15)
- Biggest win: Amiens 4–1 Guingamp; Hombourg-Haut 0–3 Amiens
- Biggest defeat: Paris FC 3–0 Amiens; Amiens 1–4 Angers
Home colours	Away colours

The 2023–24 season was Amiens Sporting Club's 123rd season in existence and fourth consecutive season in the Ligue 2. They also competed in the Coupe de France.

== Players ==
=== First-team squad ===
As of 8 February 2024

Note: Flags indicate national team as defined under FIFA eligibility rules; some limited exceptions apply. Players may hold more than one non-FIFA nationality.

No.	Pos.	Nation	Player
1	GK	FRA	Régis Gurtner (vice-captain)
2	DF	MLI	Mamadou Fofana
3	DF	SWE	Sebastian Ring
4	DF	GHA	Nicholas Opoku
5	DF	NED	Osaze Urhoghide
6	MF	FRA	Mamadou Fofana
7	MF	FRA	Antoine Leautey
8	FW	BFA	Abdoul Tapsoba (on loan from Standard Liège)
9	FW	CAF	Louis Mafouta
10	FW	COD	Gaël Kakuta
11	FW	FRA	Maxime Do Couto
13	DF	MAR	Mohamed Jaouab
14	DF	FRA	Sébastien Corchia
15	DF	BEN	Youssouf Assogba
16	GK	FRA	Alexis Sauvage

No.	Pos.	Nation	Player
17	FW	FRA	Mounir Chouiar (on loan from Ludogorets Razgrad)
20	DF	FRA	Kylian Kaïboué
23	DF	FRA	Abdourahmane Barry
24	MF	FRA	Jérémy Gelin
25	MF	FRA	Owen Gene
26	DF	MAR	Ayoub Amraoui (on loan from Nice)
27	MF	COM	Rayan Lutin
29	MF	CMR	Frank Boya
30	GK	FRA	Matthieu Rongier
32	FW	FRA	Darell Tokpa
38	FW	FRA	Yvan Ikia Dimi
45	MF	CIV	Ibrahim Fofana
55	MF	MAR	Ayman Ouhatti
99	FW	ENG	Andy Carroll

=== Out on loan ===
Note: Flags indicate national team as defined under FIFA eligibility rules; some limited exceptions apply. Players may hold more than one non-FIFA nationality.

No.	Pos.	Nation	Player
—	MF	FRA	Henri Dupays (at Union Titus Pétange until 30 June 2024)
—	FW	FRA	Hugo Chambon (at SAS Épinal until 30 June 2024)
—	FW	BEN	Angel Chibozo (at Paços de Ferreira until 30 June 2024)

No.	Pos.	Nation	Player
—	FW	SWE	Jack Lahne (at Start until 31 December 2023)
—	FW	FRA	Mathis Touho (at Le Mans until 30 June 2024)

== Competitions ==
=== Overall record ===
Competition	First match	Last match	Starting round	Final position	Record							
Competition	First match	Last match	Starting round	Final position	Pld	W	D	L	GF	GA	GD	Win %
Ligue 2	5 August 2023	17 May 2024	Matchday 1	8th	38	12	17	9	36	36	+0	31.58
Coupe de France	18 November 2023	6 January 2024	Seventh round	Round of 64	3	2	0	1	5	2	+3	66.67
Total					41	14	17	10	41	38	+3	34.15

Source: Soccerway

=== Ligue 2 ===
==== League table ====
Pos	Team	Pld	W	D	L	GF	GA	GD	Pts
6	Caen	38	17	7	14	51	45	+6	58
7	Laval	38	15	10	13	40	45	−5	55
8	Amiens	38	12	17	9	36	36	0	53
9	Guingamp	38	13	12	13	44	40	+4	51
10	Pau	38	13	12	13	60	57	+3	51

Updated to match(es) played on 17 May 2024. Source: Ligue 2
Rules for classification: 1) Points; 2) Goal difference; 3) Number of goals scored; 4) Head-to-head goal difference; 5) Fair play points

==== Results summary ====
Overall								Home						Away					
Pld	W	D	L	GF	GA	GD	Pts	W	D	L	GF	GA	GD	W	D	L	GF	GA	GD
37	11	17	9	33	35	−2	50	5	10	4	17	16	+1	6	7	5	16	19	−3

Source: Ligue 2 BKT

==== Results by round ====
Round	1	2	3	4	5	6	7	8	9	10	11	12	13	14	15	16	17	18	19	20	21	22	23	24	25	26	27	28	29	30	31	32	33	34	35	36	37	38
Ground	H	A	H	A	H	A	H	H	A	H	A	H	A	H	H	H	A	A	H	A	H	A	H	A	H	A	A	H	A	H	A	A	H	A	H	A	H	A
Result	W	W	W	L	W	L	D	D	L	L	D	D	W	L	D	W	L	D	D	W	W	W	D	L	D	D	D	D	W	L	D	D	L	D	D	W	D	
Position	6	3	2	2	2	3	3	6	9	10	10	10	10	10	10	10	11	12	12	12	11	5	5	8	8	10	9	10	9	10	10	10	12	12	10	10	11	

Source: Ligue 2 BKT
A = Away; H = Home; W = Win; D = Draw; L = Loss

==== Matches ====
The league fixtures were unveiled on 29 June 2023.

5 August 2023 1	Amiens	1–0	Quevilly-Rouen	Amiens
19:00 UTC+2	Ouattara (yellow card) 68'; Touho 90+4'	Report	Pierret (yellow card) 44'	Stadium: Stade de la Licorne; Attendance: 5,662; Referee: Azzédine Souifi

12 August 2023 2	Auxerre	0–1	Amiens	Auxerre
19:00 UTC+2		Report	Kakuta 46'; Mafouta (yellow card) 60'	Stadium: Stade Abbé-Deschamps; Referee: Olivier Thual

19 August 2023 3	Amiens	2–1	Bastia	Amiens
19:00 UTC+2	Ciss (yellow card) 13'; Mafouta 36', (yellow card) 85'; Kaïboué (yellow card) 45+4'; Gélin 48'	Report	Djoco (yellow card) 28'; Dramé 44'; Ducrocq (yellow card) 85'; Placide (red card) 90+13'	Stadium: Stade de la Licorne; Referee: Pierre Legat

26 August 2023 4	Bordeaux	2–0	Amiens	Bordeaux

2 September 2023 5	Amiens	4–1	Guingamp	Amiens
				Stadium: Stade de la Licorne

16 September 2023 6	Paris FC	3–0	Amiens	Paris

23 September 2023 7	Amiens	0–0	Valenciennes	Amiens
				Stadium: Stade de la Licorne

26 September 2023 8	Amiens	0–0	Ajaccio	Amiens
				Stadium: Stade de la Licorne

30 September 2023 9	Pau	1–0	Amiens	Pau

21 October 2023 11	Annecy	1–1	Amiens	Annecy

4 November 2023 13	Dunkerque	0–1	Amiens	Dunkirk

25 November 2023 15	Amiens	1–1	Concarneau	Amiens
19:00		Report		Stadium: Stade de la Licorne

2 December 2023 16	Amiens	1–0	Saint-Étienne	Amiens
19:00		Report		Stadium: Stade de la Licorne

5 December 2023 17	Troyes	2–0	Amiens	Troyes
20:45		Report		Stadium: Stade de l'Aube

16 December 2023 18	Rodez	2–2	Amiens	Rodez

19 December 2023 19	Amiens	0–0	Caen	Amiens
				Stadium: Stade de la Licorne

13 January 2024 20	Valenciennes	0–1	Amiens	Valenciennes

23 January 2024 21	Amiens	1–0	Annecy	Amiens
				Stadium: Stade de la Licorne

27 January 2024 22	Saint-Étienne	0–1	Amiens	Saint-Étienne

3 February 2024 23	Amiens	1–1	Paris FC	Amiens
				Stadium: Stade de la Licorne

10 February 2024 24	Caen	2–0	Amiens	Caen

19 February 2024 25	Amiens	1–1	Bordeaux	Amiens
				Stadium: Stade de la Licorne

24 February 2024 26	Ajaccio	0–0	Amiens	Ajaccio

2 March 2024 27	Laval	1–1	Amiens	Laval

9 March 2024 28	Amiens	1–1	Rodez	Amiens
				Stadium: Stade de la Licorne

16 March 2024 29	Angers	1–3	Amiens	Angers

30 March 2024 30	Amiens	2–3	Pau	Amiens
				Stadium: Stade de la Licorne

6 April 2024 31	Guingamp	0–0	Amiens	Guingamp
				Stadium: Stade de Roudourou

13 April 2024 32	Concarneau	0–0	Amiens	Brest
				Stadium: Stade Francis-Le Blé
Note: The 'host' team Concarneau plays its home matches in nearby club stadiums as its home stadium, Stade Guy-Piriou, does not meet the safety standards of Ligue 2. The two fixtures were reversed due to Storm Ciarán which damaged the Stade Francis-Le Blé in Brest.

20 April 2024 34	Amiens	0–1	Dunkerque	Amiens
				Stadium: Stade de la Licorne

23 April 2024 35	Quevilly-Rouen	1–2	Amiens	Le Petit-Quevilly
				Stadium: Stade Robert Diochon

27 April 2024 36	Amiens	0–0	Troyes	Amiens
				Stadium: Stade de la Licorne

3 May 2024 36	Bastia	1–2	Amiens	Furiani
				Stadium: Stade Armand-Cesari

10 May 2024 37	Amiens	0–0	Auxerre	Amiens
20:45				Stadium: Stade de la Licorne

17 May 2024 38	Grenoble	v	Amiens	Grenoble
20:45				Stadium: Stade des Alpes

=== Coupe de France ===
18 November 2023 Seventh round	Hombourg-Haut	0–3	Amiens	Hombourg-Haut
14:00 CET (UTC+1)	Babaya (yellow card) 17'; Ezzaitouni (yellow card) 32'; Aznar (red card) 51'	Report	Gélin 35'; Bouhalloufa 49' (o.g.); Lutin 82'	Stadium: Stade Omnisport Raymond Litzenburger; Referee: Alexandre Perreau Niel

9 December 2023 Eighth round	Thaon	0–1	Amiens	Thaon-lès-Vosges
14:00 CET (UTC+1)		Report	Mafouta 85'	Stadium: Stade Robert Sayer; Referee: Alexandre Mercier

6 January 2024 Round of 64	Amiens	1–2	Montpellier	Amiens
18:00 CET (UTC+1)	Kaïboué (yellow card) 28'; Mafouta 59'	Report	Chotard (yellow card) 37'; Assogba 43' (o.g.); Yeboah 56' (pen.)	Stadium: Stade de la Licorne; Attendance: 5,652; Referee: Clément Turpin
