= 2022–23 Amiens SC season =

Amiens SC
2022–23 season
- President: Bernard Joannin
- Head coach: Philippe Hinschberger
- Stadium: Stade de la Licorne
- Ligue 2: 12th
- Coupe de France: Round of 64
- Top goalscorer: League: Papiss Cissé (9); All: Papiss Cissé (12)
Home colours	Away colours

The 2022–23 season was the 122nd in the history of Amiens SC and their third consecutive season in the second division. The club participated in Ligue 2 and the Coupe de France.

== Players ==
As of 31 January 2023

Note: Flags indicate national team as defined under FIFA eligibility rules; some limited exceptions apply. Players may hold more than one non-FIFA nationality.

No.	Pos.	Nation	Player
1	GK	FRA	Régis Gurtner (vice-captain)
2	DF	MLI	Mamadou Fofana
3	DF	SWE	Sebastian Ring
4	DF	GHA	Nicholas Opoku
5	DF	SEN	Formose Mendy
6	MF	FRA	Mamadou Fofana
7	MF	FRA	Antoine Leautey
11	FW	BFA	Hassane Bandé
15	DF	BEN	Youssouf Assogba
16	GK	FRA	Paul Charruau
18	FW	SEN	Papiss Cissé
20	MF	FRA	Mathis Lachuer
21	FW	FRA	Janis Antiste (on loan from Sassuolo)

No.	Pos.	Nation	Player
23	DF	FRA	Abdourahmane Barry
24	MF	FRA	Jérémy Gelin
25	MF	FRA	Owen Gene
26	DF	FRA	Matthéo Xantippe
29	MF	FRA	Iron Gomis
30	GK	FRA	Matthieu Rongier
31	FW	BEN	Charbel Gomez
42	MF	CIV	Ibrahim Fofana
44	DF	FRA	Kassoum Ouattara
45	DF	FRA	Matéo Degrumelle
46	FW	NGR	George Ilenikhena
96	FW	COD	Gaël Kakuta

=== Out on loan ===
Note: Flags indicate national team as defined under FIFA eligibility rules; some limited exceptions apply. Players may hold more than one non-FIFA nationality.

No.	Pos.	Nation	Player
—	DF	CIV	Siriky Diabaté (at Borgo until 30 June 2023)
—	MF	FRA	Gaoussou Traoré (at Concarneau until 30 June 2023)
—	FW	SEN	Aliou Badji (at Bordeaux until 30 June 2023)
—	FW	FRA	Florian Bianchini (at Châteauroux until 30 June 2023)

No.	Pos.	Nation	Player
—	FW	SWE	Jack Lahne (at Újpest until 30 June 2023)
—	FW	FRA	Mustapha Sangaré (at Borgo until 30 June 2023)
—	FW	FRA	Darell Tokpa (at Differdange 03 until 30 June 2023)

== Transfers ==
=== In ===
No.	Pos.	Player	Transferred from	Fee	Date	Source
32	DF	(France) Abdourahmane Barry	(Germany) Greuther Fürth	Free	20 June 2022	

=== Out ===
Pos.	Player	Transferred to	Fee	Date	Source
MF	(Democratic Republic of the Congo) Chadrac Akolo	(Switzerland) St. Gallen	Undisclosed	3 July 2022	

== Pre-season and friendlies ==
Win Draw Loss

1 July 2022 Friendly	Amiens	1–4	Oostende	Le Touquet-Paris-Plage
16:00 CEST (UTC+2)	Barry 15'	Report	Ambrose 22', 59'; Biron 78'; Patoulidis 85' (pen.)	Stadium: Stade Gerard Houllier; Referee: M. Moktari

9 July 2022 Friendly	Auxerre	2–3	Amiens	Châlons-en-Champagne
17:30 CEST (UTC+2)	Ben Fredj 46'; Ruiz-Atil 61'		Gomis 49'; Bianchini 53'; Doums 77'	Stadium: Stade René Sache

13 July 2022 Friendly	OH Leuven	4–2	Amiens	Oud-Heverlee, Belgium
17:00 CEST (UTC+2)	Thorsteinsson 60'; Kukharevych 63', 73'; Al-Taamari 90'		Opoku 42'; Chibozo 65'	Stadium: Banqup Academy

16 July 2022 Friendly	Amiens	4–1	Le Havre	Amiens
17:30 CEST (UTC+2)	Badji 7', 20'; Arokodare 15'; Chibozo 84'	Report	Mahmoud 65'	Stadium: Annexe 2 Licorne; Referee: Anthony Ustaritz

23 July 2022 Friendly	Amiens	1–1	Quevilly-Rouen	Amiens
19:00 CEST (UTC+2)	Arokodare 37'	Report	Diedhiou 15'	Stadium: Stade de la Licorne; Referee: Loïc L'henoret

23 September 2022 Friendly	Amiens	2–5	Quevilly-Rouen	Amiens
15:00 CEST (UTC+2)	Bandé 4'; Arokodare 71'	Report	Camara 7'; Pierret 25'; Jung 47'; Mafouta 67'; Cissokho 70'	Stadium: Terrain Licorne B

== Competitions ==
=== Overall record ===
Competition	First match	Last match	Starting round	Final position	Record							
Competition	First match	Last match	Starting round	Final position	Pld	W	D	L	GF	GA	GD	Win %
Ligue 2	30 July 2022	2 June 2023	Matchday 1	12th	38	13	8	17	40	52	−12	34.21
Coupe de France	30 October 2022	7 January 2023	Seventh round	Round of 64	3	1	2	0	11	1	+10	33.33
Total					41	14	10	17	51	53	−2	34.15

Source: Soccerway

=== Ligue 2 ===
==== League table ====
Pos	Team	Pld	W	D	L	GF	GA	GD	Pts
10	Grenoble	38	14	9	15	33	36	−3	51
11	Quevilly-Rouen	38	12	14	12	47	49	−2	50
12	Amiens	38	13	8	17	40	52	−12	47
13	Pau	38	12	11	15	40	52	−12	47
14	Rodez	38	11	13	14	39	44	−5	46

Source: Ligue 2
Rules for classification: 1) Points; 2) Goal difference; 3) Number of goals scored; 4) Head-to-head goal difference; 5) Fair play points

==== Results summary ====
Overall								Home						Away					
Pld	W	D	L	GF	GA	GD	Pts	W	D	L	GF	GA	GD	W	D	L	GF	GA	GD
38	13	8	17	40	52	−12	47	8	3	8	20	22	−2	5	5	9	20	30	−10

Source: Ligue 2

==== Results by round ====
Round	1	2	3	4	5	6	7	8	9	10	11	12	13	14	15	16	17	18	19
Ground	A	H	A	H	A	H	H	A	H	A	H	A	H	A	H	A	A	H	A
Result	L	W	W	W	D	D	W	L	W	W	W	L	L	L	L	D	W	D	
Position	18	12	7	2	4	4	2	5	4	2	2	4	4	6	7	6	4	5	

Source: Ligue 2
A = Away; H = Home; W = Win; D = Draw; L = Loss

==== Matches ====
The league fixtures were announced on 17 June 2022.

30 July 2022 1	Metz	3–0	Amiens	Metz
19:00 CEST (UTC+2)	Gueye 21'; Mikautadze 44'; Niane 48'	Report		Stadium: Stade Saint-Symphorien; Attendance: 13,428; Referee: Gaël Angoula

6 August 2022 2	Amiens	1–0	Annecy	Amiens
19:00 CEST (UTC+2)	Arokodare 82'	Report		Stadium: Stade de la Licorne; Attendance: 5,479; Referee: Guillaume Paradis

13 August 2022 3	Sochaux	0–1	Amiens	Montbéliard
19:00 CEST (UTC+2)		Report	71'	Stadium: Stade Auguste Bonal; Attendance: 10,263; Referee: Rémi Landry

20 August 2022 4	Amiens	3–1	Bastia	Amiens
19:00 CEST (UTC+2)	Leautey 15'; Fofana (DF) 45+2'; Bariki 90+4'	Report	Alfarela 17'	Stadium: Stade de la Licorne; Attendance: 6,000; Referee: Abdelatif Kherradji

27 August 2022 5	Le Havre	1–1	Amiens	Le Havre
19:00 CEST (UTC+2)	Thiaré 72'	Report	Arokodare 13'	Stadium: Stade Océane; Attendance: 5,431; Referee: Antoine Valnet

30 August 2022 6	Amiens	1–1	Paris FC	Amiens
20:45 CEST (UTC+2)	Arokodare 59'	Report	Iglesias 65'	Stadium: Stade de la Licorne; Attendance: 6,384; Referee: Gaël Angoula

2 September 2022 7	Amiens	1–0	Grenoble	Amiens
20:45 CEST (UTC+2)	Arokodare 69' (pen.)	Report		Stadium: Stade de la Licorne; Attendance: 5,966; Referee: Azzedine Souifi

10 September 2022 8	Caen	3–1	Amiens	Caen
19:00 CEST (UTC+2)	Thomas (yellow card) 42', (goal) 71'; Mendy 46'; Vandermersch (yellow card) 52'; Essende 56'	Report	Barry (yellow card) 40'; Mendy 82'	Stadium: Stade Michel d'Ornano; Attendance: 12,583; Referee: Aurélien Petit

17 September 2022 9	Amiens	3–0	Niort	Amiens
19:00 CEST (UTC+2)	Fofana (MF) 55'; Cissé 60' (pen.); Arokodare 75'	Report	Moutachy (yellow card) 45+1' (yellow-red card) 59'	Stadium: Stade de la Licorne; Attendance: 6,188; Referee: (France) William Toulliou

1 October 2022 10	Rodez	0–1	Amiens	Rodez
19:00 CEST (UTC+2)	Abdallah (yellow card) 58'	Report	Cissé 29'; Opoku (yellow card) 34'; Fofana (MF) (yellow card) 37'	Stadium: Stade Paul-Lignon; Attendance: 1,187; Referee: (France) Faouzi Benchabane

8 October 2022 11	Amiens	2–1	Dijon	Amiens
19:00 CEST (UTC+2)	Mendy (yellow card) 15'; Gélin (yellow card) 29'; Opoku (red card) 43'; Leautey 57' (pen.); Kakuta 88'	Report	Gurtner 4' (o.g.); Camara (yellow card) 52'; Jacob (yellow card) 64'; Traoré (yellow card) 77'; Coulibaly (yellow card) 90'	Stadium: Stade de la Licorne; Attendance: 8,517; Referee: Benjamin Lepaysant

15 October 2022 12	Nîmes	2–0	Amiens	Nîmes
19:00 CEST (UTC+2)	Tchokounté 22'; Thomasen 34'; Fomba (yellow card) 82'	Report		Stadium: Stade des Costières; Attendance: 2,293; Referee: Bastien Dechepy

22 October 2022 13	Amiens	0–1	Saint-Étienne	Amiens
15:00 CET (UTC+1)	Ring (yellow card) 61'; Fofana (DF) (yellow card) 74'	Report	Wadji (yellow card) 35', (goal) 50' (pen.); Pétrot (yellow card) 39'	Stadium: Stade de la Licorne; Attendance: 11,101; Referee: Mikael Lesage

5 November 2022 14	Pau	2–1	Amiens	Pau
19:00 CET (UTC+1)	Barry 4' (o.g.); Evans 67'	Report	Bandé 82'	Stadium: Nouste Camp; Attendance: 3,261; Referee: Eric Wattellier

12 November 2022 15	Amiens	0–2	Quevilly-Rouen	Amiens
19:00 CET (UTC+1)	Gélin (yellow card) 20'; Opoku (yellow card) 21'	Report	Cissokho 41'; Sangaré (yellow card) 46'; Mafouta 89'	Stadium: Stade de la Licorne; Attendance: 9,684; Referee: Gaël Angoula

26 December 2022 16	Valenciennes	1–1	Amiens	Valenciennes
19:00 CET (UTC+1)	Picouleau 22'	Report	Fofana (MF) (yellow card) 16'; Kakuta 23', (yellow card) 60'	Stadium: Stade du Hainaut; Attendance: 6,339; Referee: Antoine Valnet

30 December 2022 17	Laval	0–3	Amiens	Laval
19:00 CET (UTC+1)	Baudry (yellow card) 3'	Report	Kakuta 23'; Cissé 54'; Xantippe (yellow card) 67'; Bénet 83'	Stadium: Stade Francis Le Basser; Attendance: 6,779; Referee: Romain Lissorgue

10 January 2023 18	Amiens	1–1	Guingamp	Amiens
19:00 CET (UTC+1)	Leautey (yellow card) 71'; Arokodare 90'	Report	El Ouazzani 47'; Muyumba (yellow card) 61'	Stadium: Stade de la Licorne; Attendance: 6,064; Referee: Alexandre Perreau Niel

13 January 2023 19	Bordeaux	1–1	Amiens	Bordeaux
20:45 CET (UTC+1)	Maja 42' (pen.); Fransérgio (yellow card) 58'	Report	Opoku (yellow card) 21'; Ilenikhena 90+2'	Stadium: Matmut Atlantique; Attendance: 14,934; Referee: Stéphanie Frappart

28 January 2023 20	Amiens	1–1	Le Havre	Amiens
19:00 CET (UTC+1)	Lekhal 10' (o.g.); Gomis (yellow card) 27'	Report	Thiaré 88'	Stadium: Stade de la Licorne; Attendance: 7,960; Referee: Romain Lissorgue

31 January 2023 21	Niort	1–3	Amiens	Niort
20:45 CET (UTC+1)	Kaboré (yellow card) 11'; Kilama (red card) 50'; Vallier 70'; Durivaux (yellow card) 80'	Report	Cissé 30', 37', 51' (pen.); Assogba (yellow card) 33'	Stadium: Stade René Gaillard; Attendance: 1,753; Referee: William Toulliou

6 February 2023 22	Amiens	0–2	Metz	Amiens
20:45 CET (UTC+1)		Report	Mikautadze 55' (pen.); Atta 78'	Stadium: Stade de la Licorne; Attendance: 8,000; Referee: Rémi Landry

11 February 2023 23	Paris FC	P–P	Amiens	Paris
19:00 CET (UTC+1)				Stadium: Stade Sébastien Charléty
Note: Match postponed due to pitch condition.

18 February 2023 24	Annecy	2–0	Amiens	Annecy
19:00 CET (UTC+1)	Bosetti 5'; Shamal 69'	Report	Opoku (yellow card) 44'	Stadium: Parc des Sports; Attendance: 4,441; Referee: Antoine Valnet

25 February 2023 25	Amiens	1–2	Bordeaux	Amiens
20:45 CET (UTC+1)	Cissé 17'; Mendy (yellow card) 66'	Report	Ihnatenko (yellow card) 37'; Badji 79'; Fransérgio 90+1'	Stadium: Stade de la Licorne; Attendance: 8,002; Referee: Alexandre Perreau Niel

4 March 2023 26	Amiens	1–0	Pau	Amiens
19:00 CET (UTC+1)	Leautey 6'	Report	D'Almeida (yellow card) 78'; Nišić (yellow card) 89'	Stadium: Stade de la Licorne; Attendance: 6,177; Referee: Abdelatif Kherradji

11 March 2023 27	Saint-Étienne	1–1	Amiens	Saint-Étienne
19:00 CET (UTC+1)	Krasso (yellow card) 68'; Nkounkou 76'; Cafaro (yellow card) 84'; Monconduit (yellow card) 89'	Report	Fofana (MF) (yellow card) 29'; Gomis 57'	Stadium: Stade Geoffroy-Guichard; Attendance: 23,072; Referee: Stéphanie Frappart

14 March 2023 23	Paris FC	3–0	Amiens	Paris
19:00 CET (UTC+1)	Mandouki 30'; López 48'; Chergui 84'	Report		Stadium: Stade Sébastien Charléty; Attendance: 1,847; Referee: Benjamin Lepaysant

18 March 2023 28	Amiens	1–3	Rodez	Amiens
19:00 CET (UTC+1)	Antiste 19'; Gene (yellow card) 55'	Report	Valério (yellow card) 10'; Rajot 13'; Soumano 62'; Corredor 76'	Stadium: Stade de la Licorne; Attendance: 6,010; Referee: William Toulliou

1 April 2023 29	Grenoble	2–1	Amiens	Grenoble
19:00 CET (UTC+1)	Tourraine (yellow card) 38'; Bénet 45+1' (pen.); Touray (yellow card) 64'; Sanyang 61'	Report	Mendy (yellow card) 79'; Monfray 87' (o.g.)	Stadium: Stade des Alpes; Attendance: 4,258; Referee: Benoît Bastien

8 April 2023 30	Amiens	1–0	Nîmes	Amiens
19:00 CET (UTC+1)	Kakuta 49'	Report	N'Guessan (yellow card) 56'; Thomasen (yellow card) 70'	Stadium: Stade de la Licorne; Attendance: 5,920; Referee: Antoine Valnet

15 April 2023 31	Guingamp	3–1	Amiens	Guingamp
19:00 CET (UTC+1)	Courtet 35'; Livolant 56'; Guillaume 73'	Report	Gélin (yellow card) 41'; Gomis 52'; Mendy (yellow card) 57'	Stadium: Stade de Roudourou; Attendance: 7,126; Referee: Abdelatif Kherradji

22 April 2023 32	Amiens	0–2	Valenciennes	Amiens
19:00 CET (UTC+1)	Fofana (MF) (yellow card) 34'; Opoku (yellow card) 37'	Report	Masson (yellow card) 11'; Linguet 52'; Boudraa (yellow card) 65'; Berthomier 71'	Stadium: Stade de la Licorne; Attendance: 6,784; Referee: Olivier Thual

29 April 2023 33	Bastia	1–1	Amiens	Furiani
19:00 CET (UTC+1)	Schur 30'; Placide (yellow card) 90+5'	Report	Assogba 36'; Ring (yellow card) 90+1'	Stadium: Stade Armand-Cesari; Attendance: 10,603; Referee: Faouzi Benchabane

6 May 2023 34	Amiens	1–0	Sochaux	Amiens
19:00 CET (UTC+1)	Bandé (yellow card) 56'; Ring (yellow card) 65'; Ilenikhena 76'	Report	Doumbia (yellow card) 54'	Stadium: Stade de la Licorne; Attendance: 10,407; Referee: William Touillou

13 May 2023 35	Dijon	3–0	Amiens	Dijon
19:00 CEST (UTC+2)	Le Bihan 7' 45'; Aké 74', (yellow card) 90+3'	Report	Ring (yellow card) 45+1'; Fofana (MF) (yellow card) 57'	Stadium: Stade Gaston-Gérard; Attendance: 9,511; Referee: Karim Abed

20 May 2023 36	Amiens	1–3	Caen	Amiens
19:00 CEST (UTC+2)	Gomis 13', (yellow card) 79'	Report	Thomas 40', (yellow card) 66'; Vandermersch 60'; Mendy 70'	Stadium: Stade de la Licorne; Attendance: 6,714; Referee: Gaël Angoula

26 May 2023 37	Quevilly-Rouen	1–3	Amiens	Rouen
20:45 CEST (UTC+2)	Mafouta 29' (pen.); Pierret (yellow card) 76'	Report	Lachuer (yellow card) 31'; Cissé 52', 86'; Leautey 74'	Stadium: Stade Robert Diochon; Attendance: 4,441; Referee: Bastien Dechepy

2 June 2023 38	Amiens	1–2	Laval	Amiens
20:45 CEST (UTC+2)	Barry (yellow card) 10'; Cissé 53'	Report	Sylla (yellow card) 34'; Bobichon (yellow card) 62', (goal) 68'; Diaw 90+4'	Stadium: Stade de la Licorne; Attendance: 12,300; Referee: Pierre Legat

=== Coupe de France ===
30 October 2022 Seventh rpund	FC Chambly Oise	1–1 (3–5 p)	Amiens	Chambly
14:30 CET	Doremus 15'	Report	Fofana (DF) 43'	Stadium: Stade des Marais; Referee: Brendan Roffet

19 November 2022 Eighth round	Amiens	10–0	Aiglon du Lamentin FC	Amiens
17:00 CET	Cissé 16', 24', 57'; Xantippe 23'; Kakuta 40', 53'; Bénet 49', 74'; Arokodare 65', 88'	Report		Stadium: Stade de la Licorne; Referee: Benjamin Lepaysant

7 January 2023 Round of 64	ES Thaon	0–0 (4–2 p)	Amiens	Thaon-les-Vosges
18:00 CET		Report		Stadium: Stade Robert Sayer; Referee: Pierre Legat
