= Galin =

Galin may refer to:

- Galin, Iran (disambiguation)
- Galin (given name)
- Galin (surname)
