= Gallin (surname) =

Gallin is the surname of the following notable people:

- Dan Gallin (1931–2025), Polish-born labour activist and trade unionist
- John I. Gallin (born 1943), American medical researcher
- Michel Gallin-Douathe (1920–1989), Central African diplomat and politician
- Sandy Gallin (1940–2017), American producer and talent manager
- Uri Gallin (1928–2021), Israeli Olympic discus thrower

== See also ==
- Gelin (surname)
- Galin (surname)
