= Alexis Sauvage =

French association footballer (born 1991)

Personal information
- Date of birth: 30 October 1991 (age 35)
- Place of birth: Charleville-Mézières, France
- Height: 1.86 m (6 ft 1 in)
- Position: Goalkeeper

Team information
- Current team: Reims

Youth career
- 2008–2009: Charleville
- 2009–2011: Reims

Senior career*
Years	Team	Apps	(Gls)
2011–2012	Reims	0	(0)
2012–2013	Boulogne II	17	(0)
2012–2015	Boulogne	22	(0)
2015–2017	Athlético Marseille	53	(0)
2017–2018	Red Star	7	(0)
2018–2020	Villefranche	52	(0)
2020–2023	Laval	99	(0)
2023–2026	Amiens	10	(0)
2026–	Reims	0	(0)
- * Club domestic league appearances and goals as of 12 May 2026

Alexis Sauvage (born 30 October 1991) is a French professional footballer who plays as a goalkeeper for Ligue 2 club Reims.

== Career ==
Sauvage is a youth product of Charleville and Reims and began his senior career as their backup in 2011. He transferred to Boulogne in 2012, where he was originally assigned to their reserves. After 3 seasons in Boulogne, he transferred to Athlético Marseille. On 26 January 2017, he had a short stint with Red Star and helped them win the 2017–18 Championnat National. The following season he moved to Villefranche, where he played 2 seasons. On 27 May 2020, he transferred to Laval. He helped them win the 2021–22 Championnat National, earning promotion into the Ligue 2.

On 29 June 2026, Sauvage returned to his first club Reims in Ligue 2.

== Personal life ==
Sauvage was the driver in a car accident that resulted in the death of the footballer Maurício Alves, and seriously injured his brother. Sauvage was given a suspended 6-month prison sentence for manslaughter.

== Career statistics ==
As of match played 10 May 2025

Appearances and goals by club, season and competition
Club	Season	League			Cup		League cup		Total	
Club	Season	Division	Apps	Goals	Apps	Goals	Apps	Goals	Apps	Goals
Reims	2011–12	Ligue 2	0	0	0	0	0	0	0	0
Boulogne II	2012–13	CFA 2	17	0	—		—		17	0
Boulogne	2012–13	National	0	0	0	0	0	0	0	0
Boulogne	2013–14	National	5	0	0	0	0	0	5	0
Boulogne	2014–15	National	17	0	3	0	—		20	0
Boulogne	Total		22	0	3	0	0	0	25	0
Amiens	2015–16	National	34	0	1	0	—		34	0
Amiens	2016–17	National	19	0	1	0	—		20	0
Amiens	Total		53	0	2	0	—		44	0
Red Star	2016–17	Ligue 2	0	0	—		—		0	0
Red Star	2017–18	National	7	0	1	0	0	0	8	0
Red Star	Total		7	0	1	0	0	0	8	0
Villefranche	2018–19	National	27	0	1	0	—		28	0
Villefranche	2019–20	National	25	0	4	0	—		29	0
Villefranche	Total		52	0	5	0	—		57	0
Laval	2020–21	National	33	0	0	0	—		33	0
Laval	2021–22	National	31	0	3	0	—		34	0
Laval	2022–23	Ligue 2	35	0	0	0	—		35	0
Laval	Total		99	0	3	0	—		102	0
Amiens	2023–24	Ligue 2	3	0	3	0	—		6	0
Amiens	2024–25	Ligue 2	1	0	3	0	—		4	0
Amiens	Total		4	0	6	0	—		10	0
Career total			254	0	20	0	0	0	274	0

== Honours ==
Red Star

- Championnat National: 2017–18

Laval

- Championnat National: 2021–22
