= Galyan =

Galyan may refer to:

- A type of hookah or pipe
- Galyan's, an American sporting goods chain

== See also ==
- Galin, Iran (disambiguation)
