= 2024–25 Amiens SC season =

Amiens SC
2024–25 season
- Manager: Omar Daf
- Stadium: Stade de la Licorne
- Ligue 2: 7th
- Coupe de France: Pre-season

The 2024–25 season is the 124th season in the history of the Amiens SC, and the club's fifth consecutive season in Ligue 2. In addition to the domestic league, the team will participate in the Coupe de France.

== Transfers ==
=== In ===
| Pos. | Player | Transferred from | Fee | Date | Source |
|---|---|---|---|---|---|
| DF | (France) Rémy Vita | (Netherlands) Fortuna Sittard | Loan | 24 July 2024 | |

=== Out ===
| Pos. | Player | Transferred to | Fee | Date | Source |
|---|---|---|---|---|---|
| DF | (Mali) Mamadou Fofana | (United States) New England Revolution | €1,700,000 | 1 January 2025 | |

== Friendlies ==
=== Pre-season ===
The list of preparatory matches was revealed on 27 June 2024.

| 13 July 2024 Friendly | Amiens (France) | 0–1 | (France) FC Chambly | Amiens |
| 15:00 | | | Ricol 32' | Stadium: annexe de la Licorne |

| 17 July 2024 Friendly | Amiens (France) | 2–3 | (Belgium) Francs Borains |
| 16:00 | 65'; (penalty missed) 85'; 85' | | 18' (pen.); 88'; 90+2' |

| 17 July 2024 Friendly | Kortrijk (Belgium) | 5–0 | (France) Amiens |
| 18:00 | 66'; 71'; 82'; 87'; 90' |

| 21 July 2024 Friendly | Anderlecht (Belgium) | 6–2 | (France) Amiens | Anderlecht |
| 11:00 | Flips 11'; Ure 13', 40', 83'; Arnstad 45+2', 53' | | (red card) 36'; 81'; 89' (pen.) |
Note: Behind closed doors

| 27 July 2024 Friendly | Boulogne (France) | 2–2 | (France) Amiens |
| 16:00 |

| 2 August 2024 Friendly | Dunkerque (France) | 5–1 | (France) Amiens |

| 10 August 2024 Friendly | Amiens (France) | 1–1 | (France) Metz |

== Competitions ==
=== Overall record ===
| Competition | First match | Last match | Starting round | Record | | | | | | | |
| Competition | First match | Last match | Starting round | Pld | W | D | L | GF | GA | GD | Win % |
|---|---|---|---|---|---|---|---|---|---|---|---|
| Ligue 2 | 16 August 2024 | 10 May 2025 | Matchday 1 | 16 | 7 | 2 | 7 | 20 | 21 | −1 | 43.75 |
| Coupe de France | | | | 0 | 0 | 0 | 0 | 0 | 0 | +0 | — |
| Total | | | | 16 | 7 | 2 | 7 | 20 | 21 | −1 | 43.75 |

Source: Soccerway

=== Ligue 2 ===
==== League table ====
| Pos | Team | Pld | W | D | L | GF | GA | GD | Pts | Promotion or Relegation |
|---|---|---|---|---|---|---|---|---|---|---|
| 9 | Grenoble | 34 | 13 | 7 | 14 | 43 | 44 | −1 | 46 | |
| 10 | Troyes | 34 | 13 | 5 | 16 | 36 | 34 | +2 | 44 | |
| 11 | Amiens | 34 | 13 | 4 | 17 | 38 | 50 | −12 | 43 | |
| 12 | Ajaccio (Note: Ajaccio were relegated due to financial reasons.) (D, R) | 34 | 12 | 6 | 16 | 30 | 42 | −12 | 42 | Administrative relegation to Régional 2 |
| 13 | Pau | 34 | 10 | 12 | 12 | 39 | 53 | −14 | 42 | |

Source: Ligue 2
Rules for classification: 1) Points; 2) Goal difference; 3) Number of goals scored; 4) Head-to-head goal difference; 5) Fair play points
(D) Disqualified; (R) Relegated

==== Matches ====
The match schedule was released on 21 June 2024.

Win Draw Loss

| 16 August 2024 1 | Amiens | 3–0 | Red Star | Amiens |
| 20:00 UTC+2 | Urhoghide 43'; Mafouta 46'; Leautey 57' | Report | | Stadium: Stade de la Licorne; Attendance: 4,918; Referee: Eddy Rosier |

| 23 September 2024 2 | Bastia | 1–0 | Amiens | Bastia |
| 20:00 UTC+2 | Vincent 53' | Report | | Stadium: Stade Armand-Cesari; Attendance: 13,490; Referee: Mikaël Lesage |

| 31 August 2024 3 | Amiens | 1–0 | Lorient | Amiens |
| 14:30 UTC+2 | Bakayoko 37' | Report | | Stadium: Stade de la Licorne; Attendance: 5,460; Referee: Pierre Gaillouste |

| 13 September 2024 4 | Annecy | 3–0 | Amiens | Annecy |
| 20:00 UTC+2 | Larose 19'; Pajot 61'; Demoncy 79' | Report | | Stadium: Parc des Sports; Attendance: 5,478; Referee: Gaël Angoula |

| 20 September 2024 5 | Amiens | 1–0 | Clermont Foot | Amiens |
| 20:00 UTC+2 | Kandil 6' | Report | | Stadium: Stade de la Licorne; Attendance: 5,405; Referee: Rémi Landry |

| 24 September 2024 6 | Caen | v | Amiens | Caen |
| 20:30 UTC+2 | | | | Stadium: Stade Michel d'Ornano |
