= Kassoum Ouattara =

Ivorian footballer (born 2004)

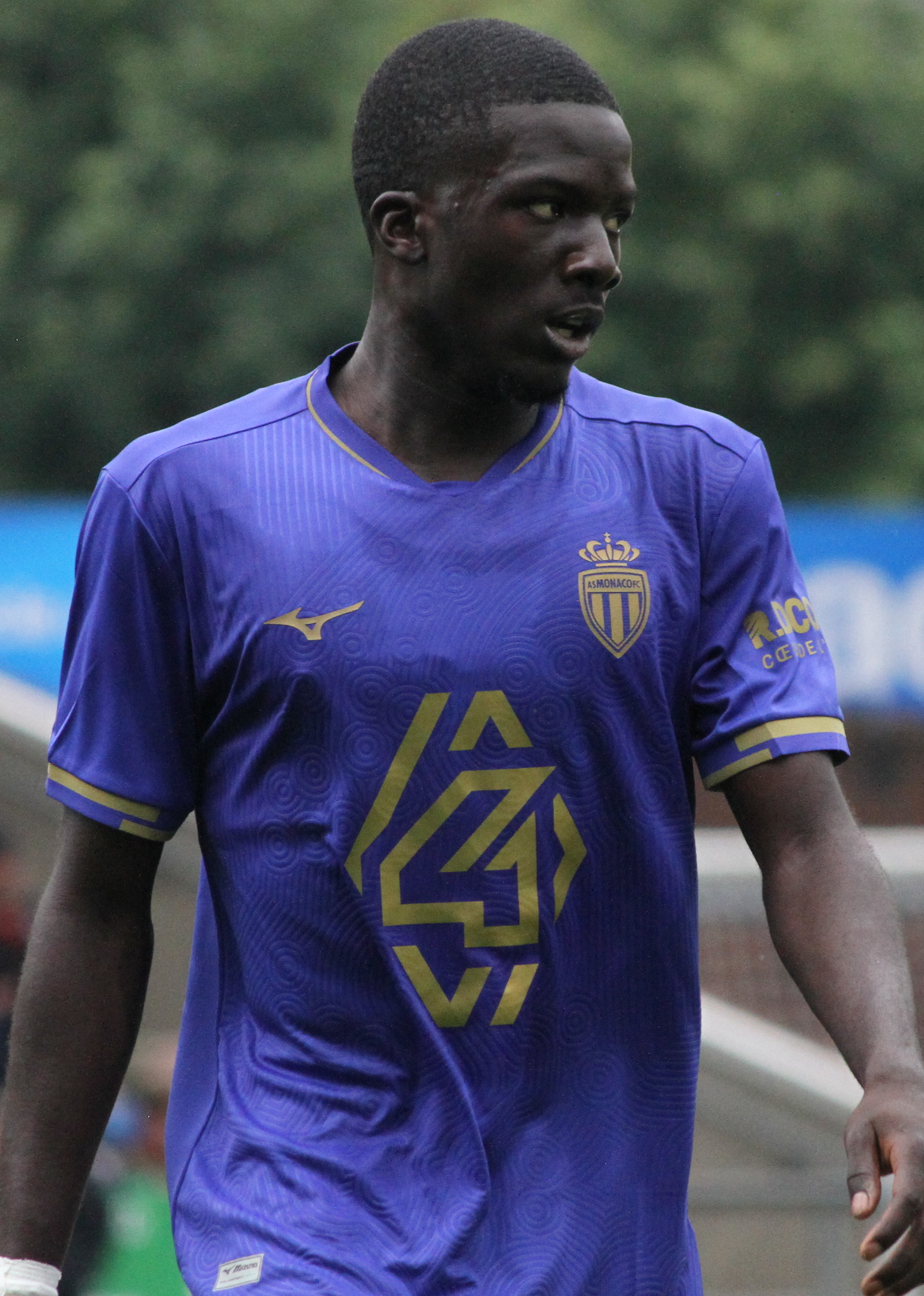
- Ouattara with Monaco in 2025

Personal information
- Date of birth: 14 October 2004 (age 22)
- Place of birth: Paris, France
- Height: 1.83 m (6 ft 0 in)
- Position: Left-back

Team information
- Current team: Beşiktaş
- Number: 11

Youth career
- 2011–2017: Ivry
- 2017–2020: FC Montrouge 92
- 2020–2022: Amiens

Senior career*
Years	Team	Apps	(Gls)
2021–2023	Amiens B	22	(1)
2022–2023	Amiens	21	(0)
2023–2026	Monaco	41	(1)
2026–	Beşiktaş	7	(0)

International career^{‡}
2022	France U18	2	(0)
2023–	France U19	3	(0)
2023–2024	France U20	7	(1)
2024	France U21	3	(0)
2026–	Ivory Coast	3	(0)
- * Club domestic league appearances and goals as of 23:04, 1 November 2026 (UTC) ‡ National team caps and goals as of 17 November 2026

Kassoum Ouattara (born 14 October 2004) is a professional footballer who plays as a left-back for Süper Lig club Beşiktaş. Born in France, he plays for the Ivory Coast national team.

== Club career ==
=== Amiens SC ===
On 7 July 2022, Ouattara signed his first professional contract for Amiens, a deal until 2025. He made his debut in a 3–1 Ligue 2 defeat to Bastia on 20 August 2022. In the second half of the 2022–23 season, he became a regular starter, starting ten of nineteen matches before an injury ended his season.

=== AS Monaco ===
On 1 November 2023, Ouattara signed a five-year contract with Ligue 1 club AS Monaco, for a reported fee of €2 million, which could rise to €4 million with add-ons. The move was a "joker" transfer, following Caio Henrique's long-term injury.

On 12 May 2024, Ouattara scored in the 52nd minute of a Ligue 1 match against Montpellier. It was his first goal for Monaco and the first goal of his professional career. Monaco won the match 2–0.

=== Beşiktaş ===
On 2 July 2026, Outtara joined the Süper Lig club Beşiktaş on a four-year deal for a reported fee of €8 million.

== International career ==
Born in France with Ivorian descent, Ouattara is eligible to represent both France and Ivory Coast at international level. He made his debut for the France under-19s in March 2023.

In 2026, Ouattara switched his allegiance to represent the Ivory Coast national team, and was called up by head coach Hervé Renard for the 2027 Africa Cup of Nations qualification matches against Ghana and Somalia, and the friendly against Cameroon on 24, 29 September and 3 October 2026. On 3 October 2026, he made his senior national debut against Cameroon in a friendly match.

== Career statistics ==
=== Club ===
As of match played 19 September 2026

Appearances and goals by club, season and competition
Club	Season	League			National cup (Note: Includes Coupe de France)		Europe		Total	
Club	Season	Division	Apps	Goals	Apps	Goals	Apps	Goals	Apps	Goals
Amiens B	2021–22	Championnat National 3	13	1	—		—		13	1
Amiens B	2022–23	Championnat National 3	9	0	—		—		9	0
Amiens B	Total		22	1	—		—		22	1
Amiens	2022–23	Ligue 2	11	0	1	0	—		12	0
Amiens	2023–24	Ligue 2	10	0	—		—		10	0
Amiens	Total		21	0	1	0	—		22	0
Monaco	2023–24	Ligue 1	14	1	3	0	—		17	1
Monaco	2024–25	Ligue 1	12	0	2	0	2 (Note: Appearances in UEFA Champions League)	0	16	0
Monaco	2025–26	Ligue 1	15	0	2	0	7	0	24	0
Monaco	Total		41	1	7	0	9	0	57	1
Beşiktaş	2026–27	Süper Lig	4	0	0	0	5 (Note: Appearances in UEFA Europa League)	0	9	0
Career total			88	2	8	0	14	0	110	2
