= Peter Hargitay =

Public relations executive (b. 1951)

Peter Hargitay (born 1951) is a public relations executive and a partner of the European Consultancy Network.

In his early career as a public relations professional Hargitay represented Union Carbide in the aftermath of the Bhopal disaster and commodities trader and fugitive Marc Rich.

In 1980 Hargitay founded the Consulting Group Europe which specialized in cases involving high-profile companies and individuals who needed help ensuring their reputations. In 1990 Hargitay produced the production of King; a musical based on the life of Martin Luther King Jr.

Hargitay was one of the executive producers on the 2010 "Fire in Babylon" film, as well as 2005 film Goal! and the final part of the Goal! trilogy, Goal III: Taking on the World.

Hargitay advised both Chelsea and FIFA in their dispute at the Court of Arbitration for Sport during the 2009 English football tapping up controversy.

In the 2000s Hargitay was a special adviser to Sepp Blatter, the President of the world governing body of football, FIFA. Hargitay left his job with FIFA to work on England's bid for the 2018 FIFA World Cup. After all outside consultants were invited to reapply for the England bid work in a tender process, European Consultancy Network declined and left the bid. Hargitay's European Consultancy Network were employed by the Football Federation of Australia to provide strategy and networking advice for Australia's bid for the 2022 FIFA World Cup. Australia's bid was ultimately unsuccessful, receiving only a single vote in the first round of voting.

Peter Hargitay has also served as a lecturer at the Universities of Neuchatel, Milan and Leicester and at Bocconi and De Montfort Universities. Since 2003, Hargitay has also been lecturing at the Centre for International Sports Studies (CIES) for the master's degree Program in Switzerland, Italy and UK.
