= Gelin (surname) =

Gelin or Gélin is a French surname that may refer to the following notable people:

- Daniel Gélin (1921–2002), French film and television actor
- Fiona Gélin (born 1962), French actress, daughter of Daniel
- Hugo Gélin (born 1980), French film director, producer and screenwriter, son of Xavier, grandson of Daniel
- Jérémy Gelin (born 1997), French football defender
- Xavier Gélin (1946–1999), French actor and film producer, son of Daniel

== See also ==
- Galin (surname)
