= Régis Gurtner =

French footballer (born 1986)

Personal information
- Date of birth: 8 December 1986 (age 39)
- Place of birth: Saverne, France
- Height: 1.83 m (6 ft 0 in)
- Position: Goalkeeper

Team information
- Current team: Lens
- Number: 1

Youth career
- –2004: Hagenau
- 2004–2008: Strasbourg

Senior career*
Years	Team	Apps	(Gls)
2008–2011	Strasbourg	43	(0)
2011–2014	Boulogne	92	(0)
2014–2015	Le Havre	4	(0)
2015–2025	Amiens	350	(0)
2025–	Lens	0	(0)
- * Club domestic league appearances and goals as of 12 May 2025

Régis Gurtner (born 8 December 1986) is a French professional footballer who plays as a goalkeeper for Ligue 1 club Lens. He has played over 500 league matches in France and spent a total of 10 seasons with Amiens.

== Early life and career ==
Gurtner was born in Saverne, France, and started playing football at the age of six at AS Rehthal, a local club. He joined FCSR Haguenau in 2000 where he spent four years before moving to RC Strasbourg in 2004. He made his debut for the Strasbourg reserve team in the Championnat de France amateur in 2005, and became the first-choice goalkeeper in 2007.

On 7 July 2025, Gurtner signed a one-season contract with Lens. On 13 July 2026, the contract was extended for the 2026–27 season.

== Career statistics ==
As of match played 19 December 2025

Appearances and goals by club, season and competition
Club	Season	League			Coupe de France		Coupe de la Ligue		Total	
Club	Season	Division	Apps	Goals	Apps	Goals	Apps	Goals	Apps	Goals
Strasbourg	2009–10	Ligue 2	3	0	0	0	0	0	3	0
Strasbourg	2010–11	National	40	0	0	0	0	0	40	0
Strasbourg	Total		43	0	0	0	0	0	43	0
Boulogne	2011–12	Ligue 2	28	0	0	0	0	0	28	0
Boulogne	2012–13	National	36	0	0	0	1	0	37	0
Boulogne	2013–14	National	28	0	3	0	1	0	32	0
Boulogne	Total		92	0	3	0	2	0	97	0
Le Havre	2014–15	Ligue 2	3	0	1	0	0	0	4	0
Amiens	2015–16	National	34	0	0	0	0	0	34	0
Amiens	2016–17	Ligue 2	38	0	0	0	0	0	38	0
Amiens	2017–18	Ligue 1	37	0	0	0	3	0	40	0
Amiens	2018–19	Ligue 1	38	0	0	0	0	0	38	0
Amiens	2019–20	Ligue 1	28	0	0	0	0	0	28	0
Amiens	2020–21	Ligue 2	31	0	0	0	—		31	0
Amiens	2021–22	Ligue 2	38	0	0	0	—		38	0
Amiens	2022–23	Ligue 2	38	0	0	0	—		38	0
Amiens	2023–24	Ligue 2	35	0	0	0	—		35	0
Amiens	2024–25	Ligue 2	33	0	0	0	—		33	0
Amiens	Total		350	0	0	0	3	0	353	0
Lens	2025–26	Ligue 1	0	0	1	0	—		1	0
Career total			488	0	5	0	5	0	498	0
