= Formose Mendy (footballer, born 2001) =

Senegalese footballer (born 2001)

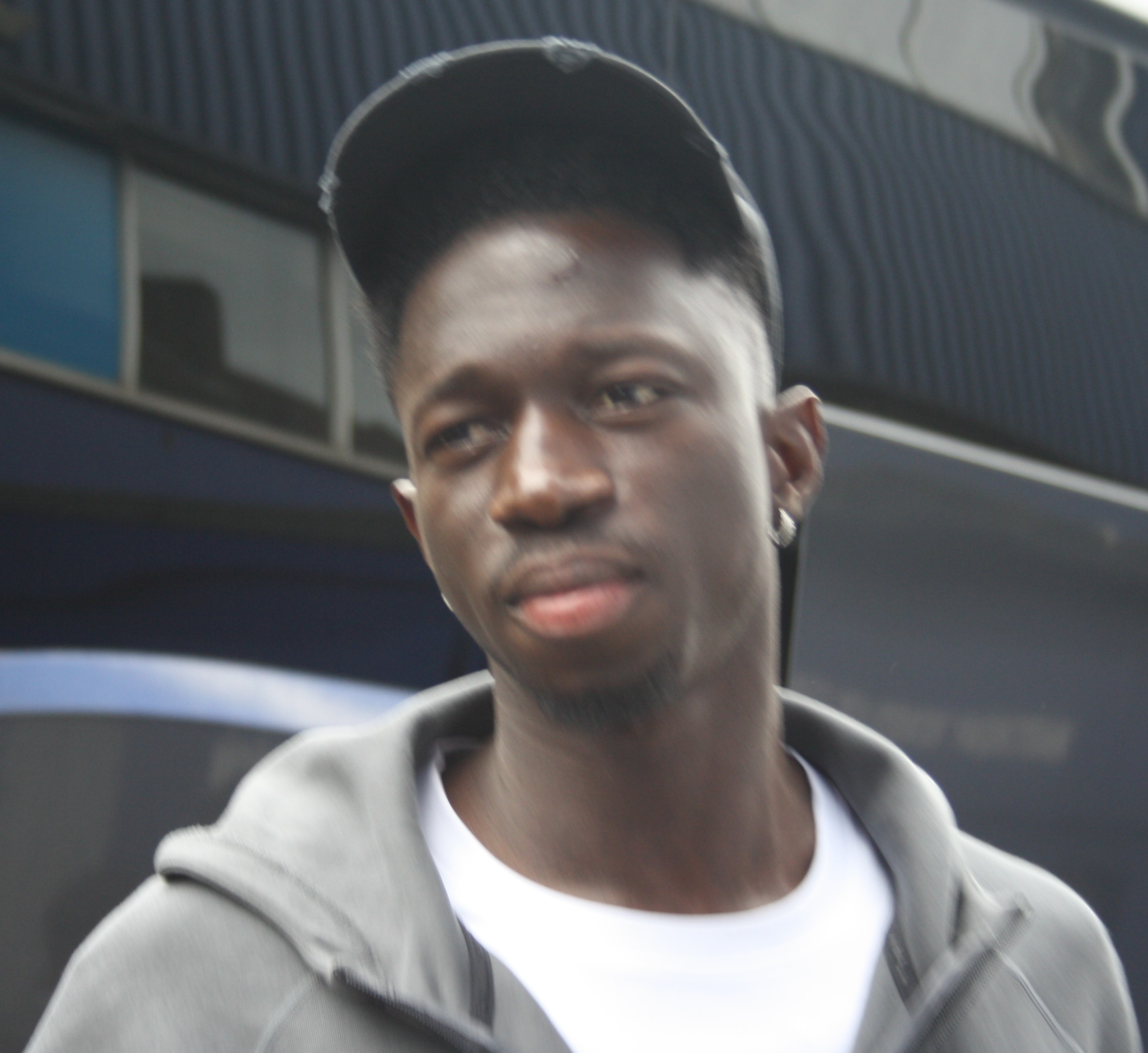
- Mendy in 2026

Personal information
- Full name: Formose Mendy
- Date of birth: 2 January 2001 (age 25)
- Place of birth: Dakar, Senegal
- Height: 1.91 m (6 ft 3 in)
- Position: Defender

Team information
- Current team: Lorient
- Number: 5

Youth career
- –2019: AF Darou Salam
- 2019–2020: Porto
- 2020–2021: Club Brugge

Senior career*
Years	Team	Apps	(Gls)
2021	Club NXT	12	(0)
2021–2023	Amiens	63	(2)
2023–	Lorient	42	(1)
2025–2026	→ Watford (loan)	6	(0)

International career
2019–2020	Senegal U20	7	(0)
2022–2024	Senegal	10	(1)
- * Club domestic league appearances and goals as of 21 March 2026

Formose Mendy (born 2 January 2001) is a Senegalese professional footballer who plays as a defender for Ligue 1 club Lorient.

== Club career ==
On 1 September 2025, Mendy joined Watford in the EFL Championship on a season-long loan, with an option to buy.

== International career ==
Mendy made his debut for Senegal against Bolivia in September 2022. He was non-playing member of Senegal's squad for the 2022 FIFA World Cup in Qatar.

In December 2023, he was named in Senegal's squad for the postponed 2023 Africa Cup of Nations held in the Ivory Coast.

== Career statistics ==
=== Club ===
As of match played 21 March 2026

Appearances and goals by club, season and competition
Club	Season	League			National cup (Note: Includes Coupe de France, FA Cup)		Other		Total	
Club	Season	Division	Apps	Goals	Apps	Goals	Apps	Goals	Apps	Goals
Club NXT	2020–21	Proximus League	12	0	—		0	0	12	0
Amiens	2021–22	Ligue 2	31	1	5	1	—		36	2
Amiens	2022–23	Ligue 2	32	1	0	0	—		32	1
Amiens	Total		63	2	5	1	—		68	3
Lorient	2023–24	Ligue 1	18	0	0	0	—		18	0
Lorient	2024–25	Ligue 2	22	1	0	0	—		22	1
Lorient	2025–26	Ligue 1	2	0	—		—		2	0
Lorient	Total		42	1	0	0	—		42	1
Watford (loan)	2025–26	Championship	6	0	0	0	—		6	0
Career total			123	3	5	1	0	0	150	5

=== International ===
As of match played 25 October 2024

Appearances and goals by national team and year
National team	Year	Apps	Goals
Senegal	2022	2	0
Senegal	2023	3	0
Senegal	2024	6	1
Total		11	1

Scores and results list Senegal's goal tally first.

List of international goals scored by Formose Mendy
No.	Date	Venue	Opponent	Score	Result	Competition
1	8 January 2024	Diamniadio Olympic Stadium, Dakar, Senegal	Niger	1–0	1–0	Friendly

== Honours ==
Lorient

- Ligue 2: 2024–25
