= Gaël Kakuta =

French-Congolese-ootballer (born 1991)

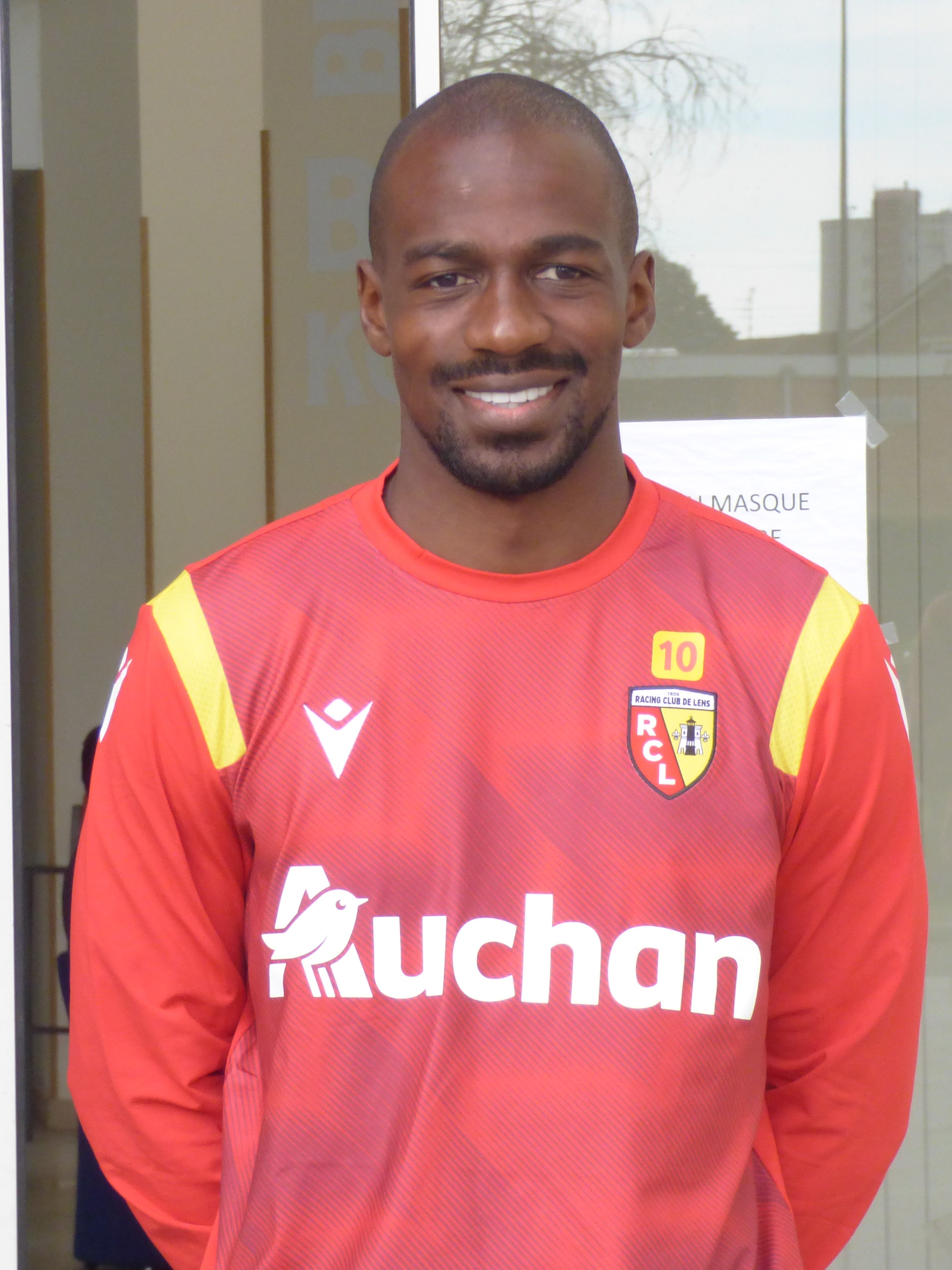
- Kakuta with Lens in 2020

Personal information
- Full name: Gaël Roméo Kakuta Mambenga
- Date of birth: 21 June 1991 (age 35)
- Place of birth: Lille, France
- Height: 1.73 m (5 ft 8 in)
- Position: Winger

Youth career
- 1998–1999: US Lille-Moulins
- 1999–2007: Lens
- 2007–2009: Chelsea

Senior career*
| Years | Team | Apps | (Gls) |
| 2009–2015 | Chelsea | 6 | (0) |
| 2011 | → Fulham (loan) | 7 | (1) |
| 2011–2012 | → Bolton Wanderers (loan) | 4 | (0) |
| 2012 | → Dijon (loan) | 14 | (4) |
| 2012–2014 | → Vitesse (loan) | 34 | (2) |
| 2014 | → Lazio (loan) | 1 | (0) |
| 2014–2015 | → Rayo Vallecano (loan) | 35 | (5) |
| 2015–2016 | Sevilla | 2 | (0) |
| 2016–2018 | Hebei China Fortune | 24 | (2) |
| 2017 | → Deportivo La Coruña (loan) | 10 | (2) |
| 2017–2018 | → Amiens (loan) | 36 | (6) |
| 2018–2019 | Rayo Vallecano | 12 | (1) |
| 2019–2021 | Amiens | 24 | (2) |
| 2020–2021 | → Lens (loan) | 35 | (11) |
| 2021–2022 | Lens | 31 | (3) |
| 2022–2024 | Amiens | 43 | (10) |
| 2024–2025 | Esteghlal | 13 | (0) |
| 2025–2026 | Sakaryaspor | 28 | (9) |
| 2026 | AEL | 12 | (1) |

International career^{‡}
| 2006–2007 | France U16 | 12 | (5) |
| 2007–2008 | France U17 | 14 | (3) |
| 2008–2009 | France U18 | 5 | (3) |
| 2009–2010 | France U19 | 13 | (4) |
| 2010–2011 | France U20 | 11 | (2) |
| 2011–2013 | France U21 | 18 | (6) |
| 2017–2026 | DR Congo | 30 | (5) |
Medal record
Men's football
Representing France
UEFA European Under-19 Championship
| Winner | 2010 |
UEFA European Under-17 Championship
| Runner-up | 2008 |
- * Club domestic league appearances and goals as of 1st August 2026 ‡ National team caps and goals as of 6 January 2026

Gaël Roméo Kakuta Mambenga (born 21 June 1991) is a former professional footballer who played as a winger. Born in France, he represented the DR Congo national team.

A youth product of RC Lens, Kakuta moved to Chelsea in 2007 in a controversial transfer. Rarely used at Chelsea, he was loaned to six teams in five countries before leaving for Sevilla upon the expiration of his contract in 2015, He retired on 4 July 2026, at age 35, following the 2026 FIFA World Cup.

He was a French youth international and represented the nation at every age group from under-16 to under-21 levels, before switching allegiance to the DR Congo national team in 2017.

== Club career ==
=== Early career ===
Kakuta was born in Lille, Nord. He started playing football at the age of seven, after seeing his uncle play for the reserve team of Lille. He began his career with local club US Lille-Moulins. In his first match with the club, they lost 17–1, however, the defeat was not enough to put him off. In 1999, he joined Lens as a youth player, and spent five years there. In 2004, Kakuta was selected to attend the Centre de Préformation de Football in nearby Liévin, a training center exclusively for players brought up in the Nord-Pas-de-Calais region. He spent two years at the center training there during the weekdays and playing with Lens on the weekends. One of his trainers at the facility was former Polish international Joachim Marx.

=== Ban and fine ===
On 3 September 2009, it was announced by the FIFA Dispute Resolution Chamber, that Kakuta would be banned for four months and be fined €780,000 due to a breach of contract with his old club Lens in order to sign for Chelsea in the summer of 2007. Chelsea were also banned from signing any players in the next two transfer windows due to their involvement in inducing the player to break his contract at Lens, meaning they would have been unable to buy or sell players until January 2011. Further to this they received a €130,000 fine, payable to Lens.

The club stated that they would "mount the strongest appeal possible" and described the behavior of FIFA as "extraordinarily arbitrary decision". Chelsea believed "the sanctions are without precedent to this level and totally disproportionate to the alleged offense and the financial penalty imposed". Chelsea appealed to the Court of Arbitration for Sport, who subsequently lifted the sanctions on the club and the player after ruling that Kakuta did not have a valid contract with Lens, and therefore could not have breached it. Chelsea's transfer ban was suspended later in the same year, and was lifted in February 2010.

=== Chelsea ===
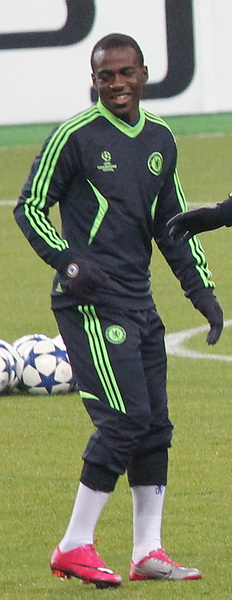
Kakuta warming up for Chelsea in 2010

Kakuta moved to Chelsea in 2007 and became a player for the youth team. He impressed at Chelsea after his first reserve game alongside teammate Michael Ballack. The German international told journalists, "Go see the French lad, he is the star". Kakuta soon began to flourish earning the Academy Scholar of the Year award after his first season with Chelsea. He was also voted Academy Player of the Year after finishing as the top scorer in the youth side finishing his first Chelsea season with 12 goals in 24 appearances. This included a hat trick against Port Vale in the FA Youth Cup.

For the 2008–09 season, Kakuta was given the opportunity to train with the first team, though he was still limited to playing with the club's reserve team. In February 2009, Kakuta saw his progress come to a shuddering halt when he suffered a double ankle fracture in a friendly against the Glenn Hoddle Academy. Kakuta missed six months returning to the team in August for a youth game against local side Queens Park Rangers. On 1 September 2009, Chelsea manager Carlo Ancelotti added Kakuta to his Champions League squad. Kakuta made his much anticipated Premier League debut during a home match against Wolverhampton Wanderers on 21 November 2009 as a substitute replacing Nicolas Anelka on the hour, impressing largely with his tricks, skills, pace and enthusiasm. On 2 December 2009, he came on as a half-time substitute for Joe Cole during the quarter-final match of the League Cup against Blackburn Rovers losing on penalties when he missed the decisive penalty in the shoot-out.

On 8 December 2009, he made his Champions League debut against APOEL. He became the youngest Chelsea player to ever represent the club in the Champions League. He played 73 minutes before being substituted for Fabio Borini. The match ended in a 2–2 draw. Ancelotti described Kakuta as the "only positive of the night" and said he "will be the future of Chelsea".

On 21 December 2010, Kakuta signed a new four-and-a-half-year contract with Chelsea, committing himself to the club until 2015. Kakuta expressed his desire to leave because he says he is unwilling to sit on the bench for another year.

==== Various loans ====
On 25 January 2011, Kakuta had a medical at Fulham with a view to joining them on loan until the end of the season. Kakuta passed his medical 26 January and joined Fulham for the rest of the 2010–11 season. He was assigned the number 24 shirt. On 5 March, Kakuta came on for Mousa Dembélé on 78 minutes in their 3–2 win over Blackburn Rovers. On 9 April, he started against Manchester United at Old Trafford, playing the full 90 minutes in attack alongside Bobby Zamora in a 2–0 defeat. He scored his first goal for Fulham against Sunderland on 30 April.

On 31 August 2011, Kakuta joined Bolton Wanderers on loan until 1 January 2012. He made his debut in the League Cup third round tie at Aston Villa on 20 September and scored in a 2–0 win, but it was not until 22 October that he made his first league appearance when coming on as a second-half substitute for Martin Petrov in a 2–0 home loss to Sunderland. Kakuta's stay was considered an unsuccessful one, where he only made six appearances in total. On 11 January 2012, Kakuta joined Dijon on loan until the end of the season. Kakuta was given the number 12 jersey. He made a goalscoring debut in the Coupe de France against Istres. On 28 January, Kakuta made his league debut, coming off the bench in a 3–1 loss against Lyon. On 11 February, Kakuta made his first league start and scored the first goal against Brest in a 1–1 draw. On 18 February, Kakuta scored the opening goal and also assisting in another for a 3–0 win against Nice.

On transfer deadline day, 31 August 2012 Kakuta joined Dutch club Vitesse on a season-long loan. On 4 July 2013, it was announced that Kakuta again joined them on loan. On 2 January 2014 it was announced that he was recalled from his loan spell, only to be sent out once more, this time on loan to Serie A side Lazio until the end of the season.

On 31 January 2014, Kakuta joined Italian side Lazio on loan for the remainder of the 2013–14 Serie A season. He made his debut on 20 February, replacing Senad Lulić in the 68th minute of an eventual 1–0 home defeat to Ludogorets in the UEFA Europa League. Kakuta's only other appearance for Lazio was in Serie A on 9 March, coming on in place of Miroslav Klose for the last four minutes as the side again lost at home by the same score, this time against Atalanta. In May, Lazio decided not to retain him. On 25 July 2014, Kakuta agreed to join La Liga side Rayo Vallecano on loan for the 2014–15 season. He made his debut in the competition on 25 August, starting and playing the full 90 minutes in a 0–0 home draw against Atlético Madrid. On 14 September, Kakuta scored his first goal for Rayo in a 3–2 home loss to Elche.

=== Sevilla ===
On 19 June 2015, following his release by Chelsea, Kakuta signed a four-year deal with Sevilla. It is understood that Sevilla paid compensation to Chelsea as he was under 24.

=== Hebei China Fortune ===
On 6 February 2016, Kakuta transferred to Chinese Super League side Hebei China Fortune.

==== Loan to Deportivo La Coruña ====
On 16 January 2017, Kakuta passed a medical check and signed on loan for La Liga side Deportivo La Coruña until the end of the 2016–17 La Liga Season.

==== Loan to Amiens ====
On 10 July 2017, Ligue 1 side Amiens announced that Kakuta signed a four-year deal with the club on a free transfer. However, Hebei China Fortune denied the transfer. On 11 August 2017, he was eventually loaned to Amiens SC for one season.

=== Return to Rayo Vallecano ===
Following the end of his loan spell at Amiens, Kakuta was purchased by Rayo Vallecano on 13 July 2018, signing a four-year contract. However, he only scored one goal in 12 appearances during the campaign, as his side suffered relegation.

=== Return to Amiens ===
On 9 August 2019, Kakuta returned to former side Amiens after the club reached an agreement with Rayo for his transfer. On 15 February 2020, Kakuta scored a stunning goal and recorded two assists in a Ligue 1 match against Paris Saint-Germain, which ended 4-4.

=== Return to Lens ===
On 9 July 2020, Kakuta joined his former club Lens on a one-year loan deal, with an option to make it permanent. He scored a penalty on his debut match, in a 2–1 defeat to Nice. On 26 May 2021, the option-to-buy in his deal was exercised, and he moved to Lens permanently.

=== Third spell at Amiens ===
On 5 October 2022, Kakuta signed for Amiens for the third time. He joined the Ligue 2 club on a four-year contract, and took the number 96 jersey.

== International career ==
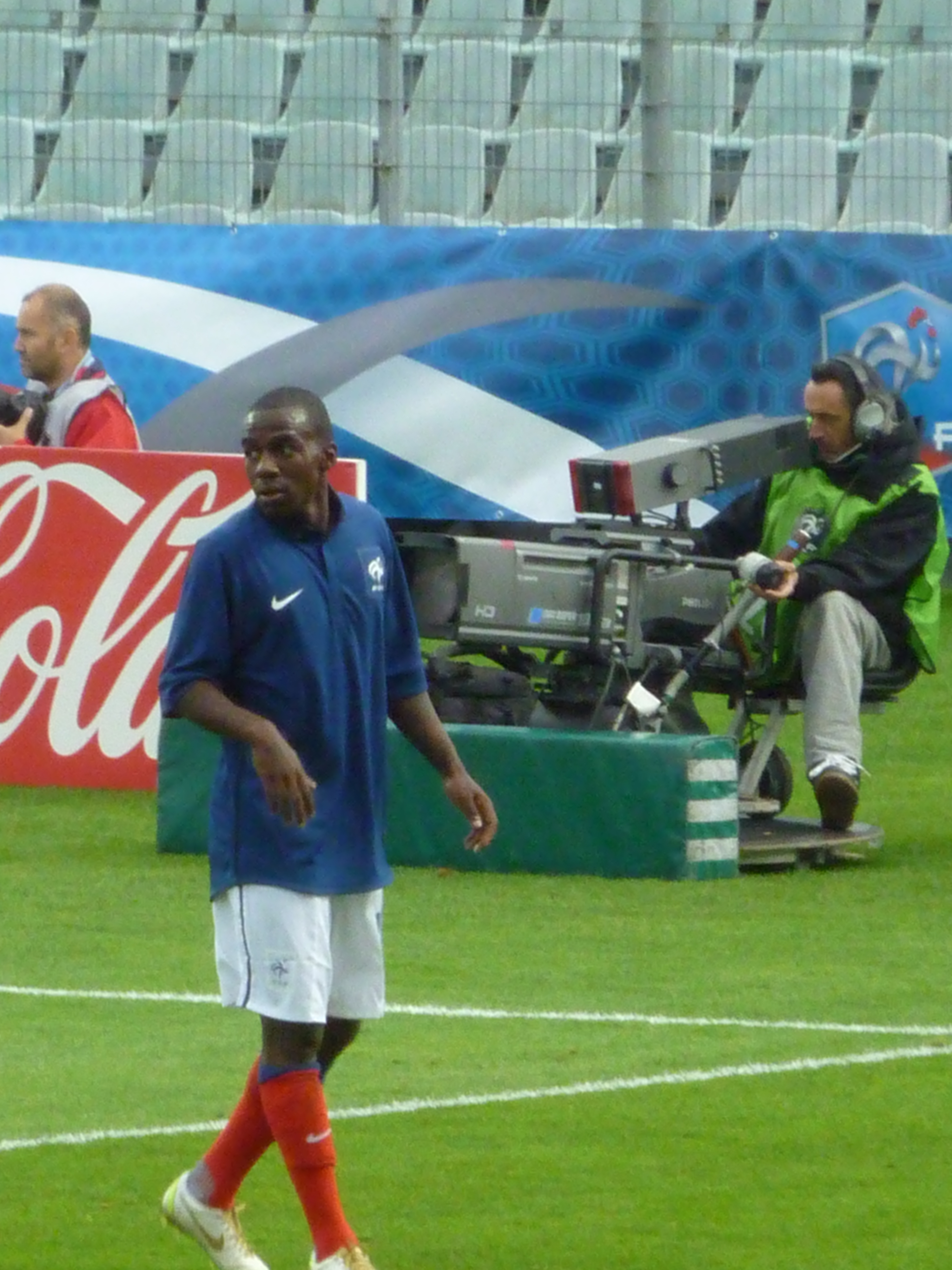
Kakuta playing for France under-21s in 2011

Kakuta was a French youth international and has represented his country at all levels. He has scored a total of 15 goals in 45 matches from under-16 level up to the under-20 level. With the under-16 team, he scored on his debut in a 1–1 draw against the Republic of Ireland. In the Tournoi de Val-de-Marne, Kakuta netted two goals in the competition against Italy and Portugal. On 15 March 2007, he was one of five players who scored a goal in the team's 5–0 thrashing of Poland in Saint-Aubin-lès-Elbeuf. Kakuta finished the under-16 campaign making 12 appearances and converting five goals.

With the under-17 team, Kakuta was a regular selection of coach Francis Smerecki. He made his debut with the team on 4 October 2007 in a 1–1 draw against Switzerland. In qualification for the 2008 UEFA European Under-17 Championship, Kakuta scored a goal in the team's 6–0 thrashing of Albania in the first qualifying round. In the Elite Round, he was clinical in the team's final group stage match against Russia scoring a double in a much-needed 3–1 victory. The win assured the team a place in the UEFA-sanctioned tournament. In the tournament, he went scoreless, but contributed to the team's finals appearance converting the 3rd penalty for France in their 4–3 penalty shootout victory over Turkey in the semi-finals. In the final, France were defeated 4–0 by Spain. With the under-18 team, Kakuta only made 5 appearances, but scored three goals, which included a brace against the Republic of Ireland in the Tournio de Limoges and the lone goal in the team's 1–0 win over Turkey in a match that was played at the Stade Mayol.

Despite the FIFA investigation into his transfer, on 2 September 2009, Kakuta was selected to the under-19 squad, for the first time, to participate in the 2009 edition of the Sendaï Cup, held in Japan. In the opening match against the hosts, he scored two goals. At the 2010 UEFA European Under-19 Championship, which France hosted, Kakuta scored the opening goal in the team's opening group stage match against the Netherlands. France won the match 4–1. Kakuta also scored against Croatia in the semi-finals. The goal drew the match at 1–1 and France went on to win 2–1. In the final, France came from behind against Spain to win the title 2–1 with Kakuta providing the assist for the winner scored by Alexandre Lacazette. On 2 August 2010, Kakuta was awarded the Golden Player award for his performances at the tournament.

Due to France's victory at the UEFA Under-19 championship, the nation qualified for the 2011 FIFA U-20 World Cup, which merited under-20 team appearances for Kakuta. He made his debut with the team on 7 October 2010 in a friendly match against Portugal, which ended 3–3. Kakuta, subsequently, appeared in three more matches with the team during the 2010–11 campaign and, on 10 June 2011, was named to the 21-man squad to participate in the U-20 World Cup. He made his debut in the competition on 30 July 2011 in the team's 4–1 defeat to the hosts Colombia.

Kakuta switched to the DR Congo national team in 2017, and made his debut in a friendly 2–1 loss against Kenya, wherein he scored the only goal for DR Congo.

On May 19, 2026, he was included in the 26-man squad selected by head coach Sébastien Desabre to represent the DR Congo at the 2026 FIFA World Cup.

== Personal life ==
Didier Drogba was understood to have made Kakuta his protégé when he first came to England.

In October 2014, fraudster Medi Abalimba was jailed for four years after masquerading as Kakuta and spending thousands of pounds on stolen credit cards.

== Career statistics ==
=== Club ===
As of match played 26 January 2026

Appearances and goals by club, season and competition
| Club | Season | League | | | National cup (Note: Includes FA Cup, Coupe de France, KNVB Cup, Coppa Italia, Copa del Rey, Chinese FA Cup, Hazfi Cup, Turkish Cup and Greek Cup) | | League cup (Note: Includes Football League Cup and Coupe de la Ligue) | | Continental | | Other | | Total | |
| Club | Season | Division | Apps | Goals | Apps | Goals | Apps | Goals | Apps | Goals | Apps | Goals | Apps | Goals |
|---|---|---|---|---|---|---|---|---|---|---|---|---|---|---|
| Chelsea | 2009–10 | Premier League | 1 | 0 | 1 | 0 | 1 | 0 | 1 (Note: Appearance(s) in UEFA Champions League) | 0 | 0 | 0 | 4 | 0 |
| Chelsea | 2010–11 | Premier League | 5 | 0 | 1 | 0 | 1 | 0 | 5 | 0 | 0 | 0 | 12 | 0 |
| Chelsea | 2011–12 | Premier League | 0 | 0 | 0 | 0 | 0 | 0 | 0 | 0 | — | | 0 | 0 |
| Chelsea | 2012–13 | Premier League | 0 | 0 | 0 | 0 | 0 | 0 | 0 | 0 | 0 | 0 | 0 | 0 |
| Chelsea | 2013–14 | Premier League | 0 | 0 | 0 | 0 | 0 | 0 | 0 | 0 | — | | 0 | 0 |
| Chelsea | 2014–15 | Premier League | 0 | 0 | 0 | 0 | 0 | 0 | 0 | 0 | — | | 0 | 0 |
| Chelsea | Total | | 6 | 0 | 2 | 0 | 2 | 0 | 6 | 0 | 0 | 0 | 16 | 0 |
| Fulham (loan) | 2010–11 | Premier League | 7 | 1 | 0 | 0 | — | | — | | — | | 7 | 1 |
| Bolton Wanderers (loan) | 2011–12 | Premier League | 4 | 0 | — | | 2 | 1 | — | | — | | 6 | 1 |
| Dijon (loan) | 2011–12 | Ligue 1 | 14 | 4 | 2 | 1 | 0 | 0 | — | | — | | 16 | 5 |
| Vitesse (loan) | 2012–13 | Eredivisie | 22 | 1 | 1 | 0 | — | | 0 | 0 | 0 | 0 | 23 | 1 |
| Vitesse (loan) | 2013–14 | Eredivisie | 12 | 1 | 1 | 2 | — | | 1 (Note: Appearance(s) in UEFA Europa League) | 0 | — | | 14 | 3 |
| Vitesse (loan) | Total | | 34 | 2 | 2 | 2 | — | | 1 | 0 | 0 | 0 | 37 | 4 |
| Lazio (loan) | 2013–14 | Serie A | 1 | 0 | — | | — | | 1 | 0 | — | | 2 | 0 |
| Rayo Vallecano (loan) | 2014–15 | La Liga | 35 | 5 | 0 | 0 | — | | — | | — | | 35 | 5 |
| Sevilla | 2015–16 | La Liga | 2 | 0 | 3 | 1 | — | | 0 | 0 | — | | 5 | 1 |
| Hebei China Fortune | 2016 | Chinese Super League | 24 | 2 | 0 | 0 | — | | — | | — | | 24 | 2 |
| Hebei China Fortune | 2017 | Chinese Super League | 0 | 0 | 0 | 0 | — | | — | | — | | 0 | 0 |
| Hebei China Fortune | 2018 | Chinese Super League | 0 | 0 | 0 | 0 | — | | — | | — | | 0 | 0 |
| Hebei China Fortune | Total | | 24 | 2 | 0 | 0 | — | | — | | — | | 24 | 2 |
| Deportivo La Coruña (loan) | 2016–17 | La Liga | 10 | 2 | 0 | 0 | — | | — | | — | | 10 | 2 |
| Amiens (loan) | 2017–18 | Ligue 1 | 36 | 6 | 0 | 0 | 2 | 0 | — | | — | | 38 | 6 |
| Rayo Vallecano | 2018–19 | La Liga | 12 | 1 | 0 | 0 | — | | — | | — | | 12 | 1 |
| Amiens | 2019–20 | Ligue 1 | 24 | 2 | 0 | 0 | 0 | 0 | — | | — | | 24 | 2 |
| Amiens | 2020–21 | Ligue 2 | 0 | 0 | 0 | 0 | — | | — | | — | | 0 | 0 |
| Amiens | Total | | 24 | 2 | 0 | 0 | 0 | 0 | — | | — | | 24 | 2 |
| Lens (loan) | 2020–21 | Ligue 1 | 35 | 11 | 1 | 0 | — | | — | | — | | 36 | 11 |
| Lens | 2021–22 | Ligue 1 | 29 | 3 | 2 | 0 | — | | — | | — | | 31 | 3 |
| Lens | 2022–23 | Ligue 1 | 2 | 0 | — | | — | | — | | — | | 2 | 0 |
| Lens | Total | | 31 | 3 | 2 | 0 | — | | — | | — | | 33 | 3 |
| Amiens | 2022–23 | Ligue 2 | 21 | 4 | 1 | 2 | — | | — | | — | | 22 | 6 |
| Amiens | 2023–24 | Ligue 2 | 22 | 6 | 0 | 0 | — | | — | | — | | 22 | 6 |
| Amiens | Total | | 43 | 10 | 1 | 2 | — | | — | | — | | 44 | 12 |
| Esteghlal | 2024–25 | Persian Gulf Pro League | 13 | 0 | 0 | 0 | — | | 4 (Note: Appearance(s) in AFC Champions League Elite) | 0 | — | | 17 | 0 |
| Sakaryaspor | 2024–25 | TFF 1. Lig | 8 | 1 | 0 | 0 | — | | — | | — | | 8 | 1 |
| Sakaryaspor | 2025–26 | TFF 1. Lig | 20 | 8 | 0 | 0 | — | | — | | — | | 20 | 8 |
| Sakaryaspor | Total | | 28 | 9 | 0 | 0 | — | | — | | — | | 28 | 9 |
| AEL | 2025–26 | Super League Greece | 1 | 0 | — | | — | | — | | — | | 1 | 0 |
| Career total | | | 360 | 58 | 13 | 6 | 6 | 0 | 12 | 0 | 0 | 0 | 391 | 64 |

=== International ===
As of match played 6 January 2026

Appearances and goals by national team and year
| National team | Year | Apps | Goals |
|---|---|---|---|
| DR Congo | 2017 | 4 | 1 |
| DR Congo | 2018 | 1 | 0 |
| DR Congo | 2019 | 2 | 0 |
| DR Congo | 2020 | 2 | 0 |
| DR Congo | 2021 | 3 | 1 |
| DR Congo | 2022 | 1 | 0 |
| DR Congo | 2023 | 6 | 1 |
| DR Congo | 2024 | 9 | 0 |
| DR Congo | 2025 | 1 | 2 |
| DR Congo | 2026 | 1 | 0 |
| Total | | 30 | 5 |

Scores and results list DR Congo's goal tally first, score column indicates score after each Kakuta goal.

List of international goals scored by Gaël Kakuta
| No. | Date | Venue | Opponent | Score | Result | Competition | Ref. |
|---|---|---|---|---|---|---|---|
| 1 | 26 March 2017 | Machakos, Kenya | Kenya | 1–1 | 1–2 | Friendly | |
| 2 | 11 November 2021 | Benjamin Mkapa Stadium, Dar es Salaam, Tanzania | Tanzania | 1–0 | 3–0 | 2022 FIFA World Cup qualification | |
| 3 | 24 March 2023 | Stade TP Mazembe, Lubumbashi, DR Congo | Mauritania | 1–0 | 3–1 | 2023 Africa Cup of Nations qualification | |
| 4 | 30 December 2025 | Al Medina Stadium, Rabat, Morocco | Botswana | 2–0 | 3–0 | 2025 Africa Cup of Nations | |
| 5 | 30 December 2025 | Al Medina Stadium, Rabat, Morocco | Botswana | 3–0 | 3–0 | 2025 Africa Cup of Nations | |

== Honours ==
France U19

- UEFA European Under-19 Championship: 2010

Individual

- Prix Marc-Vivien Foé: 2020–21
- UEFA European Under-19 Championship Golden Player: 2010
