= Mamadou Fofana (footballer, born 1998) =

Malian footballer (born 1998)

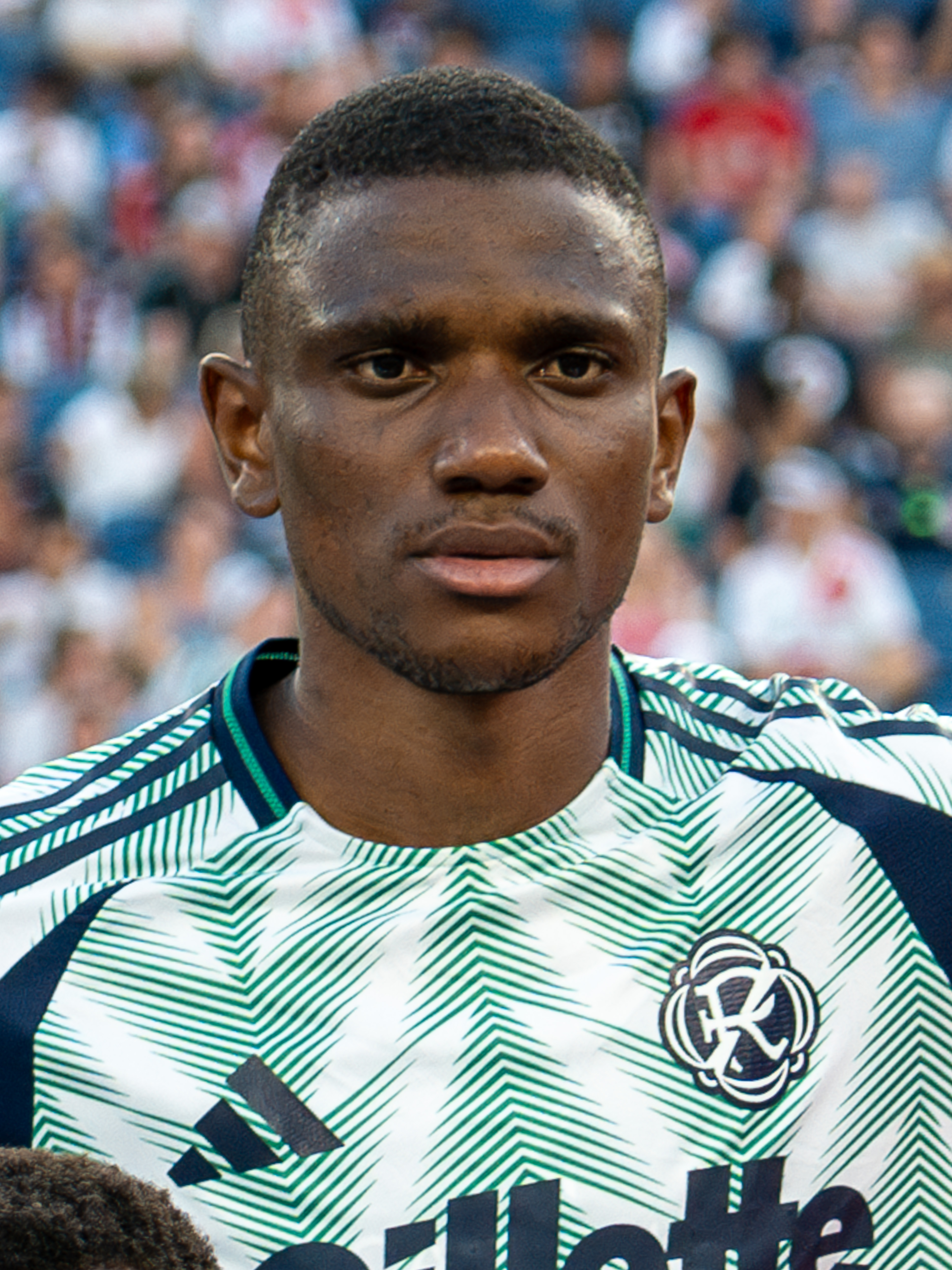
- Fofana with the New England Revolution in 2025

Personal information
- Date of birth: 21 January 1998 (age 28)
- Place of birth: Bamako, Mali
- Height: 1.87 m (6 ft 2 in)
- Position: Defender

Team information
- Current team: New England Revolution
- Number: 2

Youth career
- 2014–2016: Stade Malien
- 2016–2017: Alanyaspor

Senior career*
Years	Team	Apps	(Gls)
2017–2018	Alanyaspor	25	(0)
2017	→ Bandırmaspor (loan)	10	(0)
2018–2021	Metz	69	(0)
2021–2024	Amiens	114	(0)
2024–	New England Revolution	45	(1)

International career^{‡}
2015	Mali U17	7	(0)
2017–2018	Mali U20	3	(0)
2017–	Mali	50	(2)
- * Club domestic league appearances and goals as of 25 July 2026 ‡ National team caps and goals as of 16:02, 22 December 2025 (UTC)

Mamadou Fofana (born 21 January 1998), also known as Nojo, is a Malian professional footballer who plays as a defender for MLS side New England Revolution and the Mali national team.

== Club career ==
Fofana transferred to Alanyaspor in 2016, joining from the academy of Stade Malien. Fofana made his professional debut for Alanyaspor in a 2–3 Süper Lig loss to Çaykur Rizespor on 14 January 2017.

On 12 August 2021, he moved to Ligue 2 club Amiens and signed a five-year contract.

Fofana played his first match for Amiens on 14 August 2021 in a league fixture against EA Guingamp. He started as a central defender, and his team won the match 2–0.

Fofana scored his first goal for Amiens on 30 October 2022 in a Coupe de France match against Chambly. Starting the match and serving as captain that day, he helped his team secure victory after a penalty shoot-out.

=== New England Revolution ===
On 2 December 2024 New England Revolution signed Mamadou Fofana from French Ligue 2 side Amiens SC. Fofana joined the Revolution for a reported fee of €1.7 million. Trésarrieu also reported Fofana signed a three-year contract with the Revolution. The deal also includes a club option for 2028. Fofana made his MLS debut, and recorded his first start for the Revolution, in the 2025 season opener, a 0–0 draw against Nashville SC on 22 February. He scored his first MLS goal (and second career goal) on 4 April 2026 in a 3–0 win over CF Montréal.

== International career ==
Fofana represents Mali internationally, and represented the Mali U17s at the 2015 FIFA U-17 World Cup, and the Mali U20s at 2017 Africa U-20 Cup of Nations.

Fofana made his senior debut for the Mali national football team in a 2018 World Cup qualification tie against Ivory Coast on 6 October 2017.

On 16 October 2018, during a 2019 Africa Cup of Nations qualifying match, he scored his first goal for Mali, helping his team secure a 1–1 draw against Burundi. He played in his first international tournament at the 2019 Africa Cup of Nations.

In December 2021, Fofana was selected by coach Mohamed Magassouba to take part in the 2021 Africa Cup of Nations. On 2 January 2024, he was included in the list of twenty-seven Malian players named by Éric Chelle for the 2023 Africa Cup of Nations.

On 11 December 2025, Fofana was called up to the Mali squad for the 2025 Africa Cup of Nations.

== Career statistics ==
=== Club ===
As of match played 18 October 2025

Appearances and goals by club, season and competition
Club	Season	League			National cup (Note: Includes Turkish Cup, Coupe de France)		League cup		Other		Total	
Club	Season	Division	Apps	Goals	Apps	Goals	Apps	Goals	Apps	Goals	Apps	Goals
Alanyaspor	2016–17	Süper Lig	1	0	0	0	—		0	0	1	0
Alanyaspor	2017–18	Süper Lig	24	0	2	0	—		—		26	0
Alanyaspor	Total		25	0	2	0	—		0	0	27	0
Bandırmaspor (loan)	2016–17	TFF First League	10	0	—		—		—		10	0
Metz	2018–19	Ligue 2	32	0	4	0	3	0	—		39	0
Metz	2019–20	Ligue 2	20	0	0	0	1	0	—		21	0
Metz	2020–21	Ligue 1	16	0	3	0	—		—		19	0
Metz	2021–22	Ligue 1	1	0	0	0	—		—		1	0
Metz	Total		69	0	7	0	4	0	—		80	0
Amiens	2021–22	Ligue 2	32	0	4	0	—		—		36	0
Amiens	2022–23	Ligue 2	35	0	2	1	—		—		37	1
Amiens	2023–24	Ligue 2	33	0	1	0	—		—		34	0
Amiens	2024–25	Ligue 2	14	0	0	0	—		—		14	0
Amiens	Total		114	0	7	0	—		—		121	1
New England Revolution	2025	Major League Soccer	30	0	0	0	—		0	0	30	0
Career total			248	0	16	1	4	0	0	0	268	1

=== International ===
As of matches played on 22 December 2025

Appearances and goals by national team and year
National team	Year	Apps	Goals
Mali	2017	2	0
Mali	2018	5	1
Mali	2019	10	0
Mali	2020	2	0
Mali	2021	5	0
Mali	2022	6	1
Mali	2023	8	0
Mali	2024	9	0
Mali	2025	6	0
Total		50	2

Scores and results list Mali's goal tally first, score column indicates score after each Fofana goal.

List of international goals scored by Mamadou Fofana
No.	Date	Venue	Opponent	Score	Result	Competition
1	16 October 2018	Prince Louis Rwagasore Stadium, Bujumbura, Burundi	Burundi	1–1	1–1	2019 Africa Cup of Nations qualification
2	15 November 2022	Oran Olympic Stadium, Oran, Algeria	Algeria	1–1	1–1	Friendly match

== Honours ==
Mali U17

- FIFA U-17 World Cup runner-up:2015
