= Osaze Urhoghide =

Dutch footballer (born 2000)

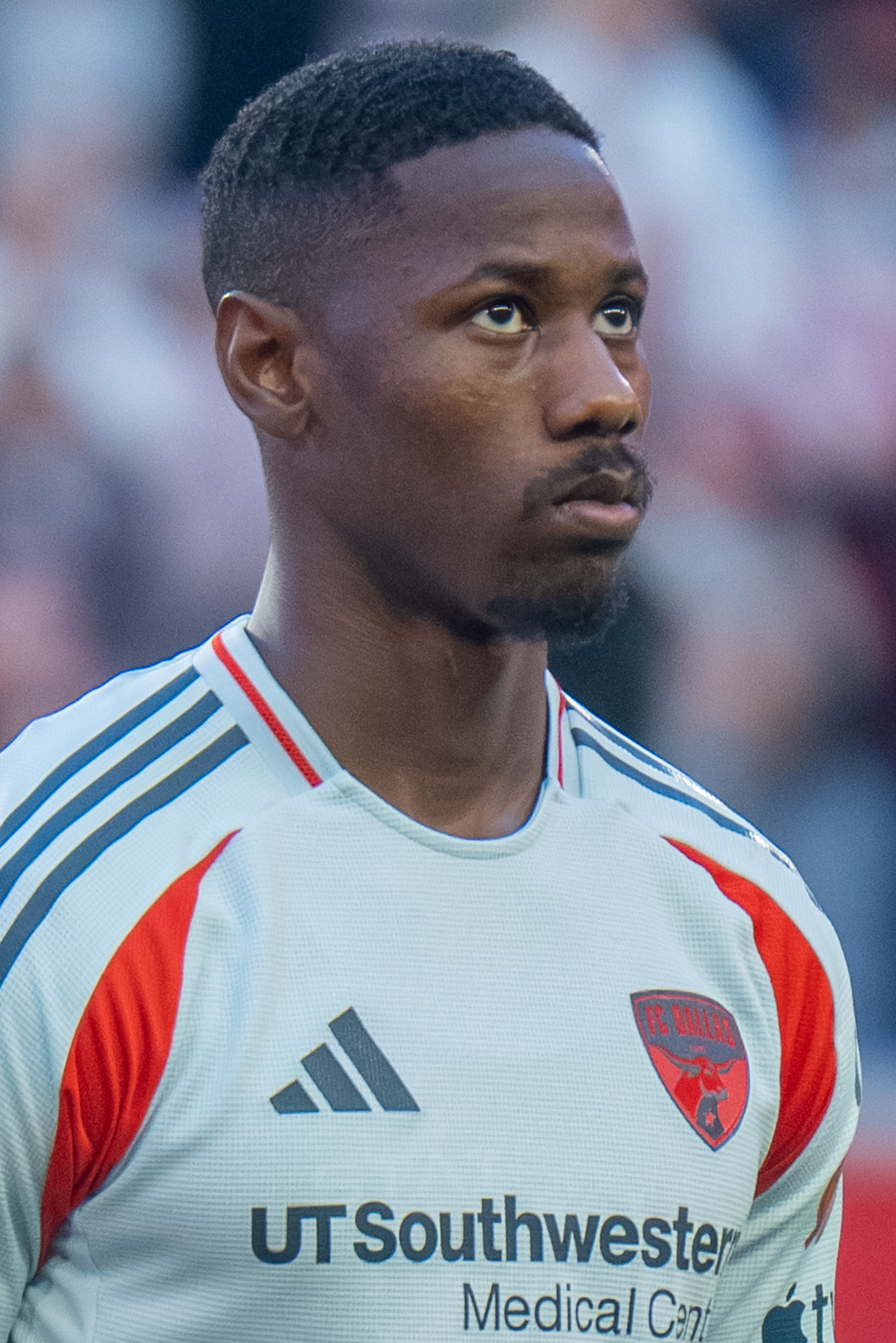
- Urhoghide with FC Dallas in 2026

Personal information
- Full name: Osaze Urhoghide
- Date of birth: 4 July 2000 (age 26)
- Place of birth: Nijmegen, Netherlands
- Height: 1.88 m (6 ft 2 in)
- Position: Centre-back

Team information
- Current team: FC Dallas
- Number: 3

Youth career
- 2014–2015: CB Hounslow United
- –2019: AFC Wimbledon

Senior career*
Years	Team	Apps	(Gls)
2019–2021	Sheffield Wednesday	19	(0)
2021–2023	Celtic	0	(0)
2022–2023	→ Oostende (loan)	34	(0)
2023–2025	Amiens	35	(2)
2025–	FC Dallas	49	(4)
- * Club domestic league appearances and goals as of 12:03, 7 October 2026 (UTC)

Osaze Urhoghide (born 4 July 2000) is a Dutch professional footballer who plays as a centre-back for FC Dallas.

== Early life ==
Urhoghide was born in Nijmegen, Netherlands, to Nigerian parents, Osaze Osagie and Joy Emwionmusi and moved to England aged five.

== Club career ==
=== AFC Wimbledon ===
Urhoghide signed his first professional contract with AFC Wimbledon on the 6 April 2018.

=== Sheffield Wednesday ===
Following his release at the end of the 2018–19 season, he impressed on trial at Championship club Sheffield Wednesday, and signed a contract with the club. He made his first team debut in the FA Cup third round tie against Brighton & Hove Albion, keeping a clean sheet in a 1–0 win.

On 4 June 2020, he extended his stay a further season by signing a new contract until 2021. He broke back into the team under Neil Thompson and was voted the club's Player of the Month for February 2021. In March 2021, Osaze started to attract interest from other clubs, with Leeds United, Crystal Place, Watford and Club Brugge all reportedly interested in the defender. Sheffield Wednesday confirmed they had offered him a new contract at the end of the 2020–21 season.

=== Celtic ===
On 1 July 2021, Urhoghide signed a four-year contract with Celtic. He made his debut for Celtic in a UEFA Europa League tie against Real Betis on 9 December 2021.

==== KV Oostende (loan) ====
On 31 January 2022, Urhoghide joined Oostende on loan until the end of the season, with an option to buy. On 27 July 2022, the loan was renewed for the 2022–23 season.

=== Amiens ===
On 24 July 2023, Urhoghide joined French side Amiens on a three-year deal.

=== FC Dallas ===
On 11 February 2025, Urhoghide joined MLS side Dallas on a four-year contract, with a one-year club option, occupying an international roster slot and becoming Dallas' highest transfer fee ever paid for a defender.

== Career statistics ==
As of 2 November 2025

Appearances and goals by club, season and competition
Club	Season	League			National cup		League cup		Continental		Total	
Club	Season	Division	Apps	Goals	Apps	Goals	Apps	Goals	Apps	Goals	Apps	Goals
Sheffield Wednesday	2019–20	EFL Championship	3	0	1	0	—		—		4	0
Sheffield Wednesday	2020–21	EFL Championship	16	0	1	0	—		—		17	0
Sheffield Wednesday	Total		19	0	2	0	0	0	0	0	21	0
Celtic	2021–22	Scottish Premiership	0	0	0	0	0	0	1	0	1	0
Celtic	2022–23	Scottish Premiership	0	0	0	0	0	0	0	0	0	0
Celtic	Total		0	0	0	0	0	0	1	0	1	0
KV Oostende (loan)	2021–22	Belgian First Division A	7	0	0	0	0	0	0	0	7	0
KV Oostende (loan)	2022–23	Belgian First Division A	27	0	2	0	0	0	0	0	29	0
KV Oostende (loan)	Total		34	0	2	0	0	0	0	0	36	0
Amiens	2023–24	Ligue 2	18	0	3	0	0	0	0	0	21	0
Amiens	2024–25	Ligue 2	17	2	3	1	0	0	0	0	20	3
Amiens	Total		35	2	6	1	0	0	0	0	41	3
FC Dallas	2025	Major League Soccer	27	2	2	0	0	0	2	0	31	2
Career total			116	4	12	1	0	0	3	0	130	5
