= Rayan Lutin =

Footballer (born 2003)

Personal information
- Date of birth: 16 January 2003 (age 23)
- Place of birth: Villepinte, Seine-Saint-Denis, France
- Height: 1.70 m (5 ft 7 in)
- Position: Midfielder

Team information
- Current team: Amedspor
- Number: 93

Youth career
- FC Villepinte
- –2016: Paris FC
- 2016–2018: FC Montfermeil
- 2018–2021: Reims
- 2021–2022: Auxerre

Senior career*
Years	Team	Apps	(Gls)
2022	Auxerre B	2	(0)
2022–2023	Amiens B	21	(3)
2023–2026	Amiens	63	(3)
2026–	Amedspor	2	(0)

International career^{‡}
2021	Comoros U20	4	(0)
2024–	Comoros	2	(0)
- * Club domestic league appearances and goals as of 31 August 2026 ‡ National team caps and goals as of 4 September 2024

Rayan Lutin (born 16 January 2003) is a professional footballer who plays as a midfielder for Süper Lig club Amedspor in Turkey. Born in France, he plays for the Comoros national team.

== Club career ==
On 2 July 2023, Lutin signed his first professional contract with Ligue 2 club Amiens, a deal until June 2024. On 9 March 2024, he made his Ligue 2 debut as a starter in a 1–1 draw against Rodez.

== International career ==
Born in France, Lutin is a former Comoros youth international. He made four appearances for the under-20s in 2021.

Lutin debuted for the senior Comoros national team on 11 June 2024 in a World Cup qualifier against Chad played in Oujda, Morocco. He substituted Youssouf M'Changama in the 83rd minute of 2–0 victory for Comoros.

On 11 December 2025, Lutin was called up to the Comoros squad for the 2025 Africa Cup of Nations.
