= Jérémy Gelin =

French footballer (born 1997)

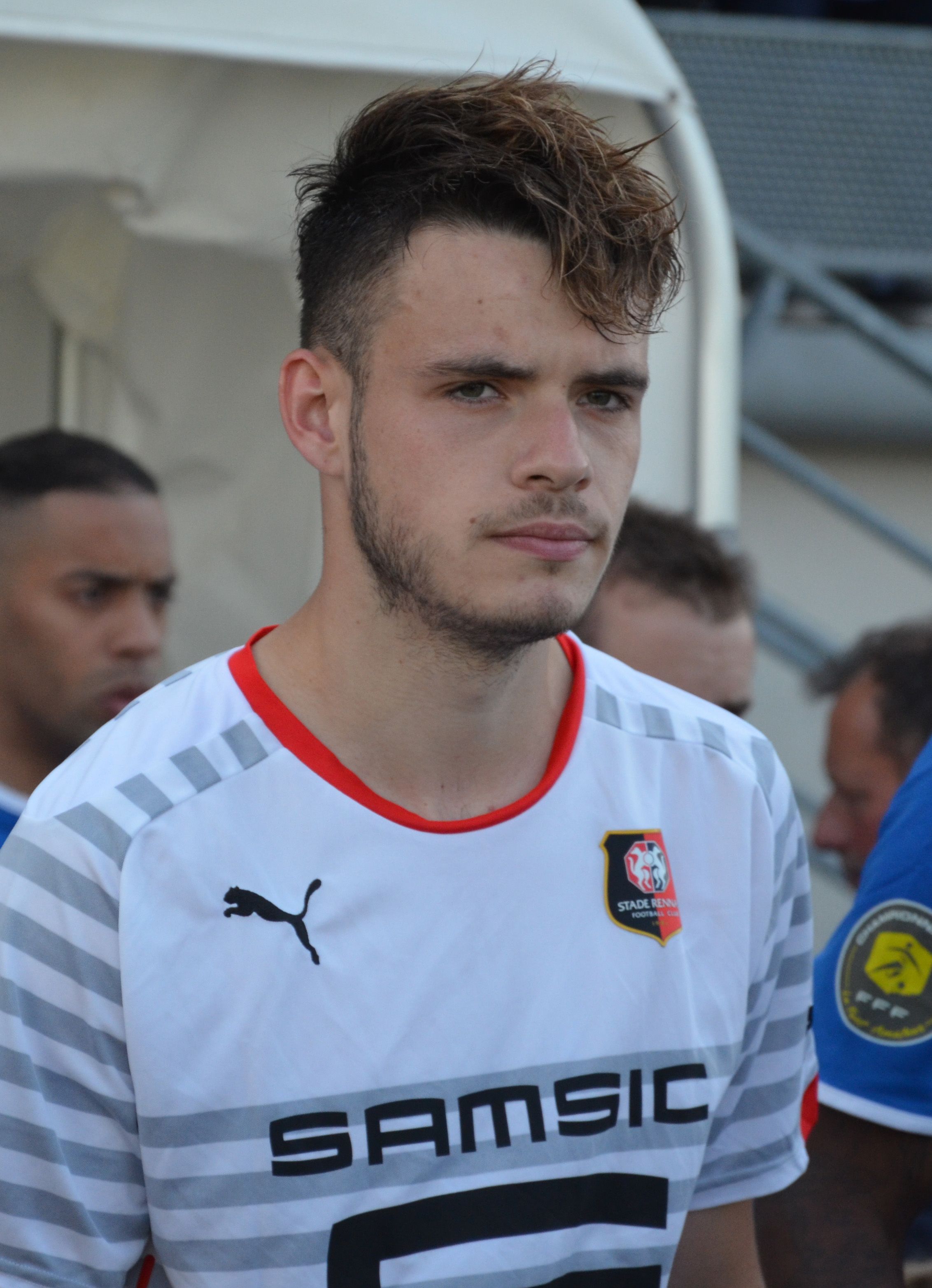
- Gelin with Rennes in 2015

Personal information
- Date of birth: 24 April 1997 (age 29)
- Place of birth: Quimper, France
- Height: 1.83 m (6 ft 0 in)
- Position: Defender

Team information
- Current team: Nancy
- Number: 25

Youth career
- 2003–2007: US Pluguffannaise
- 2007–2011: ESK Quimper
- 2011–2012: Quimper
- 2012–2017: Rennes

Senior career*
Years	Team	Apps	(Gls)
2014–2017	Rennes II	60	(1)
2017–2022	Rennes	64	(0)
2020–2021	→ Antwerp (loan)	12	(0)
2022–2024	Amiens	59	(1)
2024–2025	Panserraikos	25	(0)
2025–	Nancy	13	(1)

International career^{‡}
2013–2014	France U17	7	(0)
2015	France U18	1	(0)
2015–2016	France U19	11	(1)
2016–2017	France U20	6	(0)
2018–2019	France U21	3	(0)
- * Club domestic league appearances and goals as of 12 May 2026 ‡ National team caps and goals as of 13:30, 12 June 2019 (UTC)

Jérémy Gelin (born 24 April 1997) is a French professional footballer who plays as defender for Ligue 2 club Nancy.

== Club career ==
Gelin developed through the Rennes academy. He made his Ligue 1 debut on 28 October 2017 against Montpellier. He came on for Ramy Bensebaini in the 75th minute of a 1–0 away win.

On 7 July 2022, Gelin signed a two-year contract with Amiens.

== International career ==
Gelin is a youth international for France, most notably being in the squad that won the 2016 UEFA European Under-19 Championship.

== Career statistics ==
As of 10 April 2026

Appearances and goals by club, season and competition
Club	Season	League			National cup (Note: Includes Coupe de France, Belgian Cup)		League cup (Note: Includes Coupe de la Ligue)		Europe		Other		Total	
Club	Season	Division	Apps	Goals	Apps	Goals	Apps	Goals	Apps	Goals	Apps	Goals	Apps	Goals
Rennes B	2016–17	National 2	25	1	—		—		—		—		25	1
Rennes B	2017–18	National 2	5	0	—		—		—		—		5	0
Rennes B	Total		30	1	—		—		—		—		30	1
Rennes	2017–18	Ligue 1	28	0	1	0	4	0	—		—		33	0
Rennes	2018–19	Ligue 1	22	0	4	0	0	0	7 (Note: Appearance(s) in UEFA Europa League)	0	—		33	0
Rennes	2019–20	Ligue 1	14	0	3	1	0	0	0	0	1 (Note: Appearance(s) in Trophée des Champions)	0	18	1
Rennes	Total		64	0	8	1	4	0	7	0	1	0	84	1
Royal Antwerp (loan)	2020–21	Belgian Pro League	12	0	2	0	—		6	0	—		20	0
Rennes B	2021–22	National 3	2	1	—		—		—		—		2	1
Amiens	2022–23	Ligue 2	29	0	2	0	—		—		—		31	0
Amiens	2023–24	Ligue 2	30	1	2	1	—		—		—		32	2
Amiens	Total		59	1	2	1	—		—		—		63	2
Panserraikos	2024–25	Superleague Greece	25	0	2	0	—		—		—		27	0
Nancy	2025–26	Ligue 2	13	1	2	0	—		—		—		15	1
Career total			205	4	18	2	4	0	13	0	1	0	241	6

== Honours ==
Rennes

- Coupe de France: 2018–19

France U19

- UEFA European Under-19 Championship: 2016
