= Galin (given name) =

Galin (Cyrillic: Галин; Persian: گلین) is a Bulgarian masculine and a Persian feminine given name. It may refer to the following notable people:

- Galin Dimov (born 1990), Bulgarian football midfielder
- Galin Durev (born 1987), Bulgarian politician
- Galin Georgiev (born 1970), Bulgarian triple jumper
- Galin Ivanov (footballer born 1975) (born 1975), Bulgarian footballer and now manager
- Galin Ivanov (footballer, born 1988) (born 1988), Bulgarian footballer
- Galin Khanom, 19th century Iranian Royal consort
- Galin Khanum (mother of Mohammad Shah Qajar) (died 1857), 19th century Iranian Royal consort
- Galin Kostadinov (born 1979), Bulgarian shot putter
- Galin Minkov (born 1997), Bulgarian football player
- Galin Nikiforov, contemporary Bulgarian writer
- Galin Nikov (born 1968), Bulgarian pole vaulter
- Galin Tashev (born 1997), Bulgarian football defender
