= 2009 English football tapping up controversy =

2009 English football scandal

Allegations of tapping up in English football came to light in 2009 after accusations were made by French and English football clubs that a number of Premier League clubs had been enticing their youth players to join them.

The controversy started when RC Lens midfielder Gaël Kakuta breached his contract in order to join Chelsea. A number of French and Italian clubs alleged that Premier League clubs, including Manchester United and Manchester City, had been recruiting their youth players in violation of regulations, and reported these concerns to FIFA.

== Events ==
=== Chelsea and RC Lens ===
The issue was first introduced into the public eye in September 2009 when, after being reported by RC Lens, FIFA banned Chelsea from any transfer activity until January 2011 and also ordered €130,000 to Lens as compensation. The player in question, French midfielder Gaël Kakuta, was also ordered to pay €780,000 to Lens. Chelsea soon appealed to FIFA's actions in "the strongest possible way" under the grounds that it was Kakuta's mother who had signed the pre-contract, not her son; UEFA had assured Chelsea that they could sign the Frenchman as he was not a registered player at Lens and also because the London club believed there may was a statute of limitations on such 'illegal transfers'. Club CEO Peter Kenyon also commented that people need to "understand this is something that happened two years ago".

On 4 February 2010, Chelsea were cleared of any wrongdoing by the Court of Arbitration for Sport. That decision was recognized by FIFA, and Lens's complaint was withdrawn, resulting in the ban being overturned. The CAS's decision read "The CAS has noted that, in the agreement, the two clubs and the player have recognised that the contract between the player and RC Lens was not valid. Accordingly, the player could not have terminated it prematurely and without just cause and FC Chelsea cannot therefore be liable for inducing a breach of contract. As a consequence, in light of these new circumstances, the sanctions imposed upon Chelsea FC and the player by the FIFA Dispute Resolution Chamber had to be lifted."

=== Manchester United, Le Havre and Fiorentina ===
Following the implications against Chelsea, a further two Premier League clubs were reported in the press by French clubs for "poaching" their youth players. Le Havre soon reported Manchester United for enticing their midfielder Paul Pogba to the club. In a statement released on their official website, it was commented that "The player [Pogba] and his parents refused to keep the arrangement because Manchester United offered very high sums of money to the parents of the [player] with the aim of obtaining the transfer of their son". United soon threatened to sue the French club, commenting that they believed the transfer was legal and within guidelines set out by FIFA who have yet to receive an objection from the French club over the transfer. Manchester United were eventually cleared of wrongdoing by a judge appointed by FIFA. Despite this, Le Havre insist that "Contrary to what Manchester United state on their official website FIFA have not validated the transfer of Paul Pogba but, as they normally do in this type of case, have issued a provisional international certificate. The decision of the international body is therefore a non-event and is normal procedure."

Italian club ACF Fiorentina contacted FIFA soon after Le Havre's allegations in the media, claiming United had "stolen" 16-year-old defender Michele Fornasier. No further comments from either side have been made about the issue.

=== Manchester City and Rennes ===
Manchester City faced similar allegations from Rennes regarding their recruitment of Jérémy Hélan. Rennes claimed that Hélan had signed a pre-contract with them at age thirteen and called for FIFA to impose similar sanctions to those placed on Chelsea. City have commented that the transfer was perfectly legal, "We are comfortable that we have acted within the rules throughout the process and in no way induced any breach of contract by Jérémy Helan" read an item on the club's official website.

=== Crewe Alexandra ===
In the wake of the controversy, Crewe Alexandra technical director Dario Gradi also revealed that the club, known for producing young talented players, were losing a lot of their players to bigger clubs. Gradi commented that he "lost a 12-year-old to Everton. He was our best 12-year-old. The lure is that the bigger clubs pay big expenses", before continuing "This kid will be getting several hundred pounds a week in expenses. We pay expenses but nothing like that. It's more a case of giving out £20 if someone can pick a kid up en-route". In the same interview, Gradi also revealed a Premier League club had attempted to poach one of their 15-year-old players. Some media outlets speculated that the player involved was striker Max Clayton and that the Premier League club was Liverpool, with reports suggesting an offer of approximately £1 million. Neither Gradi nor Crewe had confirmed who the player is and which Premier League club was involved, the Merseyside club have failed to comment on the issue and the Football League have not received any complaint from the League Two club.

== Reactions ==
In reaction to FIFA's ban on Chelsea, PFA chairman Gordon Taylor revealed he was in favour of a transfer ban on players under the age of 18 years, "There's been a general feeling that a ban on movement of players under the age of 18 would be better for the game" he commented in an interview with BBC Radio 5 Live, "You need to encourage clubs, if they're going to have youth development programmes, to be able to pick out the lads and have some time with them" he added. Taylor conceded that players will move on, but he felt a better system for compensation for the selling club should be introduced.

Arsenal manager Arsène Wenger expressed a different view, suggesting that the movement of young players could provide better coaching and educational opportunities. Manchester United manager Sir Alex Ferguson pointed out the anomaly that prevents clubs from signing young players from beyond a certain distance within England, but does not prohibit them from signing young foreigners.

Further to his allegations, Dario Gradi also said he was delighted with FIFA's actions against Chelsea, "at least Fifa have given the smaller clubs hope".
