= Galin, Iran =

Galin or Gelin or Galyan (Persian: گلين) in Iran may refer to:

- Galin, Kurdistan
- Gelin, Mazandaran
- Galin, Qazvin
