= Mathis Touho =

French footballer (born 2004)

Personal information
- Date of birth: 24 November 2004 (age 21)
- Place of birth: Montreuil, France
- Height: 1.85 m (6 ft 1 in)
- Position: Forward

Team information
- Current team: Rodez
- Number: 11

Youth career
- –2019: Choisy-le-Roi
- 2019–2022: Amiens

Senior career*
Years	Team	Apps	(Gls)
2022–2026	Amiens B	31	(9)
2023–2026	Amiens	17	(1)
2024	→ Le Mans (loan)	15	(2)
2025	→ Foggia (loan)	8	(0)
2026	Villefranche	14	(3)
2026–	Rodez	0	(0)
- * Club domestic league appearances and goals as of 23 June 2026

Mathis Touho (born 24 November 2004) is a French professional footballer who plays as a forward for Ligue 2 club Rodez.

== Career ==
On 5 August 2023, Touho scored his first professional goal, a last-minute winner for Amiens in a 1–0 Ligue 2 victory over Quevilly-Rouen.

On 30 January 2024, Touho joined Le Mans on loan.

On 3 February 2025, Touho moved on loan to Foggia in Italian third-tier Serie C, with an option to buy.

On 2 July 2026, Touho moved to Rodez in Ligue 2 with a three-year contract.

== Personal life ==
Touho was born in Montreuil, in the eastern suburbs of Paris. He holds both French and Ivorian nationalities.
