= Nicholas Opoku =

Ghanaian footballer

Personal information
- Date of birth: 11 August 1997 (age 29)
- Place of birth: Kumasi, Ghana
- Height: 1.90 m (6 ft 3 in)
- Position: Defender

Team information
- Current team: Las Palmas

Senior career*
Years	Team	Apps	(Gls)
- Kumasi Corner Babies
2016–2017	Berekum Chelsea	19	(1)
2017–2018	Club Africain	18	(0)
2018–2021	Udinese	19	(0)
2020–2021	→ Amiens (loan)	34	(0)
2021–2024	Amiens	65	(0)
2024–2026	Kasımpaşa	57	(0)
2026–	Las Palmas	0	(0)

International career^{‡}
- Ghana U17
- Ghana U20
2017–	Ghana	18	(0)
- * Club domestic league appearances and goals as of 10 June 2026 ‡ National team caps and goals as of 24 June 2026

Nicholas Opoku (born 11 August 1997) is a Ghanaian professional footballer who plays as a defender for Segunda División club Las Palmas. He has also been capped at the international level.

== Club career ==
Opoku started his career with Kumasi Corner Babies, before moving to top-tier club Berekum Chelsea. On 11 August 2017, he signed a three-year deal with Tunisian club Club Africain. After unpaid wages, he terminated his link with the latter club (which was later sentenced by the Court of Arbitration for Sport to pay him US$279,500 in April 2021) in June 2018.

On 13 July 2018, Opoku signed with Serie A side Udinese until 30 June 2022. He made his debut in Europe on 26 August, replacing Valon Behrami late into a 1–0 home win over Sampdoria.

On 28 January 2020, Opoku joined Ligue 1 club Amiens on loan with an option to buy until 30 June 2020. Despite suffering relegation, his loan was renewed for a further year on 28 August, and he signed a permanent deal with the club in June 2021.

On 19 August 2024, Opoku agreed to a two-year contract with Turkish side Kasımpaşa. On 7 August 2026, he switched teams and countries again, signing a deal of the same duration with Segunda División side Las Palmas.

== International career ==
Opoku was a part of the Ghana under 17 squad that competed in 2013 African U-17 Championship. He has also represented the Ghana under-20 team.

In July 2017, Opoku made his senior international debut in a 2–1 defeat against United States. He came as a 38th-minute substitute for Rashid Sumaila following his knee injury.
