= Mamadou Fofana (footballer, born 2000) =

Mauritanian footballer (born 2000)

Personal information
- Date of birth: 17 September 2000 (age 26)
- Place of birth: Le Havre, France
- Height: 1.77 m (5 ft 10 in)
- Position: Midfielder

Team information
- Current team: Nancy
- Number: 17

Youth career
- 2011–2017: Le Havre

Senior career*
Years	Team	Apps	(Gls)
2017–2021	Le Havre II	28	(5)
2020–2021	Le Havre	9	(1)
2021–2022	Amiens II	2	(0)
2021–2024	Amiens	63	(3)
2024–2026	Aarau	25	(1)
2025–2026	→ Blau-Weiß Linz (loan)	24	(1)
2026–	Nancy	0	(0)

International career^{‡}
2026–	Mauritania	1	(0)
- * Club domestic league appearances and goals as of 10 June 2026 ‡ National team caps and goals as of 01:44, 8 June 2026 (UTC)

Mamadou Fofana (born 17 September 2000) is a professional footballer who plays as a midfielder for Ligue 2 club Nancy. Born in France, he plays for the Mauritania national team.

== Club career ==
Fofana made his professional debut for Le Havre in a 2–0 Ligue 2 draw against Troyes on 24 August 2020.

On 22 June 2021, he signed a three-year contract with Amiens.

On 4 September 2024, Fofana joined Aarau in Switzerland on a two-season deal.

== Internatioanl career ==
Fofana was called up to the Mauritania national team for a set of friendlies in June 2026.

On 29 September 2026, Fofana made his debut in an AFCON qualifier against Benin.

== Personal life ==
Fofana was born in France is of Malian and Mauritanian descent. He is the brother of the professional footballers Gueïda and Guessouma Fofana.
