= Youssouf Assogba =

Beninese footballer

Personal information
- Full name: Youssouf Amouda Assogba
- Date of birth: 21 August 2001 (age 25)
- Place of birth: Parakou, Benin
- Height: 1.73 m (5 ft 8 in)
- Position: Right-back

Youth career
- 2014–2017: APEC
- 2017–2019: Kraké

Senior career*
Years	Team	Apps	(Gls)
2019–2023	Amiens II	12	(1)
2020–2024	Amiens	36	(1)
2021–2022	→ Boulogne (loan)	11	(0)
2021–2022	→ Boulogne II (loan)	1	(0)
2022	→ Jönköpings Södra (loan)	11	(1)
2024–2025	Bordeaux	17	(0)
2024–2025	Bordeaux B	2	(0)

International career^{‡}
2019–	Benin	20	(0)
- * Club domestic league appearances and goals as of 5 October 2024 ‡ National team caps and goals as of 13 October 2025

Youssouf Amouda Assogba (born 21 August 2001) is a Beninese professional footballer who plays as a right-back for the Benin national team.

== Club career ==
Assogba began his career with the youth academies APEC and Kraké in Benin. On 21 November 2019, Assogba signed with Amiens SC from Benin.

On 13 September 2021, he joined Boulogne on loan. On 30 March 2022, Assogba moved on a new loan to Jönköpings Södra in Sweden.

In September 2024, Assogba joined Championnat National 2 club Bordeaux.

== International career ==
Assogba debuted with the Benin national team in a friendly 2–1 win against Ivory Coast on 6 September 2020.
