= Galin (surname) =

Galin (Cyrillic: Галин; feminine: Galina) is the surname of the following notable people:

- Dmitri Galin (born 1989), Russian football player
- Gunnar Galin (1902–1997), Swedish footballer, ice hockey player and bandy player
- Miloš Galin (born 1990), Bosnia Herzegovina football striker
- Mitchell Galin, American film and television producer
- Pierre Galin (1786–1822), French music educator
- Rudolf Galin (1928–2004), Croatian hammer thrower
