= Antoine Leautey =

French association football player (born 1996)

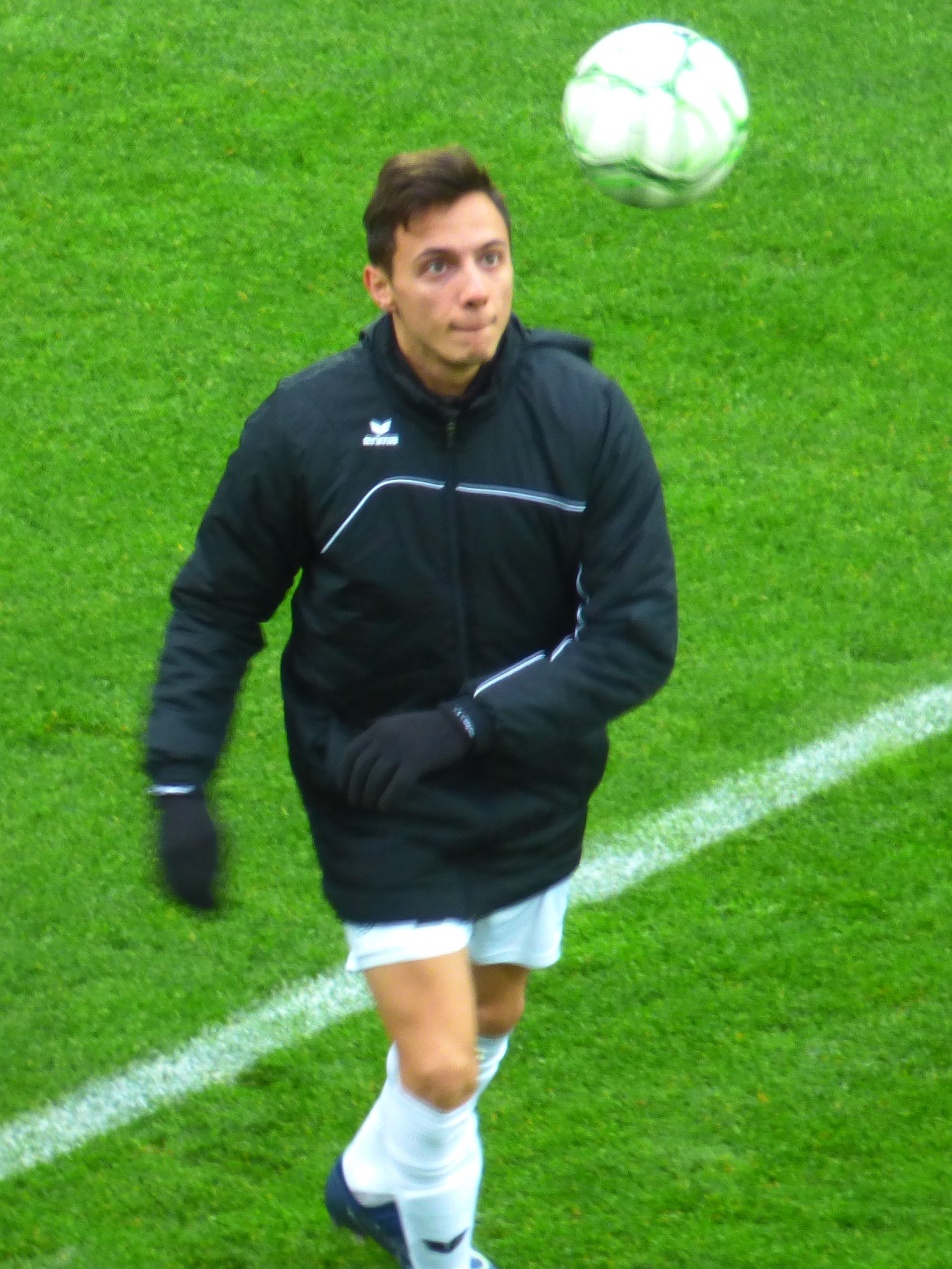
- Leautey training with Chamois Niortais in 2019

Personal information
- Full name: Antoine Arthur Leautey
- Date of birth: 14 April 1996 (age 30)
- Place of birth: Versailles, France
- Height: 1.72 m (5 ft 8 in)
- Positions: Winger; midfielder

Team information
- Current team: Wuhan Three Towns
- Number: 50

Youth career
- Paris Saint-Germain
- Caen

Senior career*
Years	Team	Apps	(Gls)
2016–2017	Boulogne	14	(2)
2017–2020	Chamois Niortais	93	(5)
2017	→ Boulogne (loan)	14	(1)
2020–2022	Gil Vicente	52	(3)
2022–2025	Amiens	110	(18)
2025–2026	Reims	8	(1)
2025–2026	→ Amiens (loan)	17	(2)
2026–	Wuhan Three Towns	12	(2)
- * Club domestic league appearances and goals as of 8 November 2026

Antoine Arthur Leautey (born 14 April 1996) is a French professional footballer who plays as a winger for Chinese Super League club Wuhan Three Towns. He has also played senior football with Chamois Niortais, Boulogne, Gil Vicente and Amiens and passed through the youth systems at Caen and Paris Saint-Germain.

== Playing career ==
Born in Versailles, near Paris, Leautey spent time in the youth set-up at Paris Saint-Germain as a junior. He later joined Caen, where he played 33 games for the reserve team between 2014 and 2016, scoring 10 goals. In the summer of 2016, Leautey agreed terms with Championnat National side Boulogne. After scoring twice in 14 appearances during the first half of the season, he was signed by Ligue 2 club Chamois Niortais on a three-and-a-half-year contract. However, he was loaned back to Boulogne for the remainder of the 2016–17 season.

Leautey made his professional debut with Niort on the opening weekend of the 2017–18 campaign in the 0–0 draw with AC Ajaccio at the Stade René Gaillard on 28 July 2017. Two weeks later, he scored his first goal for the club in a 2–0 win over Auxerre after coming on as a substitute for Didier Lamkel Zé.

On 27 May 2022, Leautey signed a three-year contract with Amiens beginning in the 2022–23 season.

On 26 August 2025, Leautey signed a two-year contract with Reims, with an optional third year.

On 11 December 2025, Leautey returned to Amiens, on a loan until the end of the season.

== Career statistics ==
As of matches played 8 November 2026

Appearances and goals by club, season and competition
Club	Season	League			Cup		League Cup		Total	
Club	Season	Division	Apps	Goals	Apps	Goals	Apps	Goals	Apps	Goals
Boulogne	2016–17	Championnat National	28	3	0	0	0	0	28	3
Chamois Niortais	2017–18	Ligue 2	33	2	3	0	1	0	37	2
Chamois Niortais	2018–19	Ligue 2	33	2	3	0	0	0	36	2
Chamois Niortais	2019–20	Ligue 2	27	1	2	0	3	1	29	2
Chamois Niortais	Total		93	5	8	0	4	1	105	6
Gil Vicente	2020–21	Primeira Liga	25	1	2	0	0	0	27	1
Gil Vicente	2021–22	Primeira Liga	27	2	1	0	1	0	29	2
Gil Vicente	Total		52	3	3	0	1	0	56	3
Amiens	2022–23	Ligue 2	36	4	1	0	—		37	4
Amiens	2023–24	Ligue 2	37	4	2	0	—		39	4
Amiens	2024–25	Ligue 2	34	10	2	0	—		36	10
Amiens	2025–26	Ligue 2	3	0	—		—		3	0
Amiens	Total		110	18	5	0	—		115	18
Reims	2025–26	Ligue 2	8	1	1	0	—		9	1
Amiens (loan)	2025–26	Ligue 2	17	2	3	0	—		20	2
Wuhan Three Towns	2026	Chinese Super League	12	2	—		—		12	2
Career total			320	34	20	0	5	1	345	35
