= Louis Mafouta =

Footballer (born 1994)

Personal information
- Date of birth: 2 July 1994 (age 32)
- Place of birth: Beaumont-sur-Oise, France
- Height: 1.86 m (6 ft 1 in)
- Position: Centre forward

Team information
- Current team: Le Mans
- Number: 14

Senior career*
Years	Team	Apps	(Gls)
2013–2016	AS Saint-Ouen-l'Aumône	51	(10)
2016	Panserraikos	6	(1)
2017	USM Senlis	19	(11)
2018	Chambly	2	(0)
2019–2020	Grasse	27	(17)
2020–2022	Neuchâtel Xamax	52	(21)
2022	→ Metz (loan)	15	(2)
2022–2023	Quevilly-Rouen	34	(11)
2023–2025	Amiens	66	(24)
2025–2026	Guingamp	34	(15)
2026–	Le Mans	2	(3)

International career^{‡}
2017–	Central African Republic	35	(17)
- * Club domestic league appearances and goals as of 30 August 2026 ‡ National team caps and goals as of 16 November 2026

Louis Mafouta (born 2 July 1994) is a professional footballer who plays as a striker for Ligue 1 club Le Mans. Born in France, he plays for the Central African Republic national team and is the country's leading all-time leading goalscorer.

== Club career ==
Born in Beaumont-sur-Oise, he has played for AS Saint-Ouen-l'Aumône, Panserraikos, USM Senlis, Chambly and Chambly II.

In January 2019, he moved to Grasse.

In August 2020, Mafouta signed a two-year contract with Swiss Challenge League club Neuchâtel Xamax.

On 19 January 2022, Mafouta joined Metz in Ligue 1 on loan with an option to buy.

On 1 July 2022, Mafouta signed a three-year contract with Quevilly-Rouen. In his only season at the club, he recorded eleven goals, a club record in Ligue 2. On 12 July 2023, Mafouta signed for fellow Ligue 2 side Amiens.

On 5 August 2025, Mafouta joined Guingamp on a three-season contract.

On 11 July 2026, Mafouta signed a two-year deal with Ligue 1 club Le Mans.

== International career ==
He made his international debut for the Central African Republic on 27 March 2017, in their 2–1 defeat to Gambia. On 7 September 2023 he scored his 11th international goal and surpassed Hilaire Momi as Les Fauves' all-time top scorer.

== Career statistics ==
=== International goals ===
Scores and results list the Central African Republic's goal tally first, score column indicates score after each Mafouta goal.

List of international goals scored by Louis Mafouta
No.	Date	Venue	Opponent	Score	Result	Competition
1	27 March 2017	Prince Moulay Abdellah Stadium, Rabat, Morocco	Gambia	1–1	1–2	Friendly
2	27 May 2018	Stade Général Seyni Kountché, Niamey, Niger	Niger	1–1	3–3	Friendly
3	13 November 2019	Barthélemy Boganda Stadium, Bangui, Central African Republic	Burundi	2–0	2–0	2021 Africa Cup of Nations qualification
4	13 November 2020	Stade Mohammed V, Casablanca, Morocco	Morocco	1–1	1–4	2021 Africa Cup of Nations qualification
5	26 March 2021	Intwari Stadium, Bujumbura, Burundi	Burundi	1–0	2–2	2021 Africa Cup of Nations qualification
6	26 March 2021	Intwari Stadium, Bujumbura, Burundi	Burundi	2–0	2–2	2021 Africa Cup of Nations qualification
7	23 March 2023	Mahamasina Municipal Stadium, Antananarivo, Madagascar	Madagascar	2–0	3–0	2023 Africa Cup of Nations qualification
8	23 March 2023	Mahamasina Municipal Stadium, Antananarivo, Madagascar	Madagascar	3–0	3–0	2023 Africa Cup of Nations qualification
9	27 March 2023	Stade de la Réunification, Douala, Cameroon	Madagascar	1–0	2–0	2023 Africa Cup of Nations qualification
10	27 March 2023	Stade de la Réunification, Douala, Cameroon	Madagascar	2–0	2–0	2023 Africa Cup of Nations qualification
11	7 September 2023	Baba Yara Stadium, Kumasi, Ghana	Ghana	1–0	1–2	2023 Africa Cup of Nations qualification
12	10 June 2024	Baba Yara Stadium, Kumasi, Ghana	Ghana	1–1	3–4	2026 FIFA World Cup qualification
13	10 June 2024	Baba Yara Stadium, Kumasi, Ghana	Ghana	2–1	3–4	2026 FIFA World Cup qualification
14	10 June 2024	Baba Yara Stadium, Kumasi, Ghana	Ghana	3–4	3–4	2026 FIFA World Cup qualification
15	5 September 2024	Ben M'Hamed El Abdi Stadium, El Jadida, Morocco	Lesotho	1–0	3–1	2025 Africa Cup of Nations qualification
16	5 September 2024	Ben M'Hamed El Abdi Stadium, El Jadida, Morocco	Lesotho	2–0	3–1	2025 Africa Cup of Nations qualification
17	12 November 2026	Félix Houphouët-Boigny Stadium, Abidjan, Ivory Coast	Benin	1–1	1–4	2027 Africa Cup of Nations qualification
