= Stade de la Licorne =

Football stadium

Coordinates: 49°53′39″N 2°15′48″E

- Interactive map of Stade de la Licorne
- Location: Rue du Chapître, Amiens
- Capacity: 12,097
- Surface: Grass

Construction
- Opened: 24 July 1999
- Renovated: 2018
- Cost: ~€15 million
- Architects: Atelier d Architecture Chaix & Morel et Associés
- Structural engineers: AR & C

Tenant
- Amiens SC

Stade de la Licorne (French pronunciation: [stad də la liˈkɔʁn]) is a multi-use stadium in Amiens, France. It is currently used mostly for football matches and is the home stadium of Amiens SC. The stadium is able to hold 12,097 people and was built in 1999. The first match held in the stadium was the Trophée des Champions match between FC Nantes Atlantique and FC Girondins de Bordeaux on 24 July 1999. The stadium is visually striking, with an unusually large transparent roof.

RC Lens played their home matches there for the 2014/15 Ligue 1 season because the Stade Bollaert-Delelis was being renovated for the 2016 European Championships.

In 2018 the stadium underwent a remodel following a barrier collapse in the stands during a match against OSC Lille. The renovations were completed for €15 million, nearly as much as the original construction cost. Included in the remodel was an undersoil heating system for the pitch.
