= 2021–22 Amiens SC season =

Amiens
2021–22 season
- President: Bernard Joannin
- Head coach: Philippe Hinschberger
- Stadium: Stade de la Licorne
- Ligue 2: 14th
- Coupe de France: Quarter-finals
- Top goalscorer: League: Aliou Badji (12); All: Aliou Badji (13)
Home colours	Away colours

The 2021–22 season was the 121st season in the existence of Amiens SC and the club's second consecutive season in the second division of French football. In addition to the domestic league, Amiens participated in this season's edition of the Coupe de France.

== Players ==
=== First-team squad ===
As of 8 February 2022

Note: Flags indicate national team as defined under FIFA eligibility rules; some limited exceptions apply. Players may hold more than one non-FIFA nationality.

No.	Pos.	Nation	Player
1	GK	FRA	Régis Gurtner (vice-captain)
2	DF	MLI	Mamadou Fofana
4	DF	GHA	Nicholas Opoku
5	DF	SEN	Formose Mendy
6	MF	FRA	Mamadou Fofana
7	FW	FRA	Kader Bamba (on loan from Nantes)
8	MF	TOG	Matthieu Dossevi
9	FW	NGR	Tolu Arokodare (on loan from Valmiera)
10	MF	FRA	Arnaud Lusamba
11	FW	FRA	Adama Diakhaby
12	MF	GHA	Emmanuel Lomotey
14	DF	CRO	Mateo Pavlović
15	MF	FRA	Eddy Gnahoré
16	GK	GLP	Yohann Thuram-Ulien

No.	Pos.	Nation	Player
17	FW	SEN	Aliou Badji (on loan from Al Ahly)
18	DF	FRA	Harouna Sy
19	FW	COD	Chadrac Akolo
20	MF	FRA	Mathis Lachuer
21	MF	FRA	Jessy Bénet
26	FW	SWE	Jack Lahne
27	FW	FRA	Mustapha Sangaré
28	MF	FRA	Gaoussou Traoré
31	FW	BEN	Charbel Gomez
36	MF	FRA	Owen Gene
39	DF	FRA	Matthéo Xantippe
40	GK	FRA	Ylies Zitouni
—	DF	COD	Nathan Monzango

=== Other players under contract ===
Note: Flags indicate national team as defined under FIFA eligibility rules; some limited exceptions apply. Players may hold more than one non-FIFA nationality.

No. / Pos. / Nation / Player; — / MF / FRA / Jonathan Bumbu	No. / Pos. / Nation / Player; — / MF / RSA / Bongani Zungu

=== Out on loan ===
Note: Flags indicate national team as defined under FIFA eligibility rules; some limited exceptions apply. Players may hold more than one non-FIFA nationality.

No.	Pos.	Nation	Player
—	DF	BEN	Youssouf Assogba (at Boulogne)
—	MF	FRA	Iron Gomis (at Dunkerque)
—	MF	MAR	Ayman Ouhatti (at Orléans)

No.	Pos.	Nation	Player
—	FW	FRA	Florian Bianchini (at Avranches)
—	FW	FRA	Darell Tokpa (at Red Star)

== Pre-season and friendlies ==
Win Draw Loss

2 July 2021 Friendly	Le Havre AC	0–2	Amiens	Le Touquet, France
17:00 CEST (UTC+2)				Stadium: Stade Gerard Houllier

7 July 2021 Friendly	Charleroi	3–3	Amiens	Belgium
18:00 CEST (UTC+2)

10 July 2021 Friendly	Amiens	2–1	Oostende	Amiens, France
15:00 CEST (UTC+2)		Report		Stadium: Stade de la Licorne

17 July 2021 Friendly	Amiens	3–4	Union Saint-Gilloise	France
16:00 CEST (UTC+2)

== Competitions ==
=== Overall record ===
Competition	First match	Last match	Starting round	Final position	Record							
Competition	First match	Last match	Starting round	Final position	Pld	W	D	L	GF	GA	GD	Win %
Ligue 2	24 July 2021	14 May 2022	Matchday 1	14th	38	9	17	12	43	41	+2	23.68
Coupe de France	13 November 2021	8 February 2022	Seventh round	Quarter-finals	6	4	1	1	17	8	+9	66.67
Total					44	13	18	13	60	49	+11	29.55

Source: Soccerway

=== Ligue 2 ===
==== League table ====
Pos	Team	Pld	W	D	L	GF	GA	GD	Pts
12	Bastia	38	10	16	12	38	36	+2	46
13	Niort	38	12	10	16	39	42	−3	46
14	Amiens	38	9	17	12	43	41	+2	44
15	Grenoble	38	12	8	18	32	44	−12	44
16	Valenciennes	38	10	14	14	34	47	−13	44

Source: Ligue 2
Rules for classification: 1) Points; 2) Goal difference; 3) Number of goals scored; 4) Head-to-head goal difference; 5) Fair play points

==== Results summary ====
Overall								Home						Away					
Pld	W	D	L	GF	GA	GD	Pts	W	D	L	GF	GA	GD	W	D	L	GF	GA	GD
38	9	17	12	43	41	+2	44	7	6	6	26	16	+10	2	11	6	17	25	−8

Source: Ligue 2

==== Results by round ====
Round	1	2	3	4	5	6	7	8	9	10	11	12	13	14	15	16	17	18	19	20	21	22	23	24	25	26	27	28	29	30	31	32	33	34	35	36	37	38
Ground	H	A	H	A	H	A	H	A	H	A	H	A	H	A	H	A	H	H	A	H	A	H	A	H	A	H	A	H	A	H	A	H	A	H	A	A	H	A
Result	L	L	L	W	D	D	L	D	D	D	D	L	W	D	D	D	W	W	L	L	D	W	D	W	D	W	L	W	L	D	W	D	D	L	D	D	L	L
Position	17	18	20	16	16	15	16	17	17	18	18	19	18	18	19	19	16	12	15	17	15	13	14	11	11	11	11	9	11	13	11	11	10	11	11	13	13	14

Source: Ligue 2
A = Away; H = Home; W = Win; D = Draw; L = Loss

==== Matches ====
The league fixtures were announced on 25 June 2021.

24 July 2021 1	Amiens	1–2	Auxerre	Amiens
19:00 CEST (UTC+2)	Alphonse 39', (yellow card) 87'; Lomotey (yellow card) 76'	Report	Perrin (yellow card) 45+2'; Georgen (yellow card) 48'; Sakhi 63'; Hein 71'; Sinayoko (yellow card) 82'	Stadium: Stade de la Licorne; Referee: Mathieu Vernice

31 July 2021 2	Ajaccio	3–1	Amiens	Ajaccio
19:00 CEST (UTC+2)	Cimignani 10'; Courtet 45+1'; Avinel (yellow card) 46'; Gonzalez (yellow card) 65'; Moussiti-Oko 74'	Report	Arokodare 47' (pen.); Lachuer (yellow card) 62'; Diakhaby (yellow card) 65'; Gomis (yellow card) 69'; Papeau (yellow card) 88'	Stadium: Stade François Coty; Referee: Nicolas Rainville

7 August 2021 3	Amiens	1–3	Quevilly-Rouen	Amiens
19:00 CEST (UTC+2)	Akolo 11'	Report	Nazon 19', 39', 58'; Bansais (yellow card) 36'; Diaby (red card) 50'; Boé-Kane (yellow card) 90+4'	Stadium: Stade de la Licorne; Referee: Marc Bollengier

14 August 2021 4	Guingamp	0–2	Amiens	Guingamp
19:00 CEST (UTC+2)	Riou (yellow card) 36'; Pierrot (yellow card) 41'; Roux (yellow card) 56'	Report	Lachuer (yellow card) 32'; Papeau 41'; Lahne (yellow card) 55', (goal) 71'	Stadium: Stade de Roudourou; Referee: Alexandre Perreau Niel

21 August 2021 5	Amiens	0–0	Sochaux	Amiens
19:00 CEST (UTC+2)	Lomotey (yellow card) 32' (yellow-red card) 67'	Report	Lopy (yellow card) 60' (yellow-red card) 75'; Thioune (yellow card) 70'; Weissbeck (yellow card) 28'; Tebily (yellow card) 90+2'	Stadium: Stade de la Licorne; Referee: Jérôme Miguelgorry

28 August 2021 6	Niort	0–0	Amiens	Niort
19:00 CEST (UTC+2)	Cassubie (yellow card) 54'; Yongwa (yellow card) 90+2'	Report	Alphonse (yellow card) 55'	Stadium: Stade René Gaillard; Referee: Bartolomeu Varela

11 September 2021 7	Amiens	0–1	Rodez	Amiens
19:00 CEST (UTC+2)	Lachuer (yellow card) 20'; Lusamba (yellow card) 42'	Report	Danger 34'; Dépres (yellow card) 54'; Rajot (yellow card) 74'	Stadium: Stade de la Licorne; Referee: Nicolas Rainville

18 September 2021 8	Nîmes	3–3	Amiens	Nîmes
19:00 CEST (UTC+2)	Benrahou 16'; Sainte-Luce 21'; Delpech (yellow card) 66'; Koné 75', (yellow card) 77'; Fomba (yellow card) 90+1'; Martinez (yellow card) 90+5'	Report	Xantippe (yellow card) 35'; Bamba (yellow card) 44'; Badji 60'; Lomotey (yellow card) 72'; Lahne 89'; Arokodare 90+5'	Stadium: Stade des Costières; Referee: Remi Landry

21 September 2021 9	Amiens	2–2	Pau	Amiens
20:00 CEST (UTC+2)	Pavlović 7'; Arokodare 76'	Report	Lobry 38' (pen.); Essende (yellow card) 48'; Batisse (yellow card) 89'; Dianessy 90'	Stadium: Stade de la Licorne; Referee: Marc Bollengier

24 September 2021 10	Nancy	1–1	Amiens	Tomblaine
21:00 CEST (UTC+2)	Biron (yellow card) 58'; Haag 61'	Report	Arokodare (yellow card) 9' (yellow-red card) 43'; Mendy 14'; Bamba (red card) 45+3'; Sy (yellow card) 90+8'	Stadium: Stade Marcel Picot; Referee: Olivier Thual

2 October 2021 11	Amiens	0–0	Toulouse	Amiens
15:00 CEST (UTC+2)	Pavlović (yellow card) 90+3'	Report	Dejaegere (yellow card) 28'; Spierings (yellow card) 73'	Stadium: Stade de la Licorne; Referee: Mathieu Vernice

16 October 2021 12	Dijon	1–0	Amiens	Dijon
19:00 CEST (UTC+2)	Ngouyamsa (red card) 45+1'; Dobre 59'; Younoussa (yellow card) 80'	Report		Stadium: Stade Gaston Gérard; Referee: Jérôme Miguelgorry

23 October 2021 13	Amiens	3–0	Valenciennes	Amiens
19:00 CEST (UTC+2)	Badji (yellow card) 35'; Lusamba 42' (pen.). 78'; Bamba 57', (yellow card) 77'; Lomotey (yellow card) 81'	Report	Lecoeuche (yellow card) 77'	Stadium: Stade de la Licorne; Referee: Bartolomeu Varela

30 October 2021 14	Bastia	0–0	Amiens	Furiani
19:00 CEST (UTC+2)	Vincent (yellow card) 13'; Robic (yellow card) 90+3'	Report	Badji (yellow card) 37'; Pavlović (yellow card) 60'; Bénet (yellow card) 90+3'	Stadium: Stade Armand Cesari; Referee: Thomas Léonard

6 November 2021 15	Amiens	0–0	Caen	Amiens
19:00 CEST (UTC+2)	Lusamba (yellow card) 45'; Pavlović (yellow card) 82'	Report	Rivierez (yellow card) 29' da Costa (yellow card) 65'; Abdi (yellow card) 81'; Fouda (yellow card) 90+3'	Stadium: Stade de la Licorne; Attendance: 8,790; Referee: Alexandre Perreau Niel

20 November 2021 16	Le Havre	1–1	Amiens	Le Havre
19:00 CEST (UTC+2)	Cornette 42'	Report	Lomotey (yellow card) 40'; Bamba (yellow card) 74'; Lusamba 90' (pen.), (yellow card) 90+1'	Stadium: Stade Océane; Referee: Jérôme Miguelgorry

3 December 2021 17	Amiens	3–0	Dunkerque	Amiens
21:00 CET (UTC+1)	Badji 26', 90+2'; Pavlović (yellow card) 46'; Akolo 80'; Fofana (Mali) (yellow card) 83'	Report	Pierre (yellow card) 63'; Thiam (yellow card) 84'	Stadium: Stade de la Licorne; Referee: Benjamin Lepaysant

11 December 2021 18	Amiens	4–1	Grenoble	Amiens
19:00 CET (UTC+1)	Arokodare 35', 44'; Badji 51', 56'	Report	Anani (yellow card) 53', (goal) 85'; Belmonte (yellow card) 70'	Stadium: Stade de la Licorne; Referee: Frank Schneider

21 December 2021 19	Paris FC	1–0	Amiens	Paris
20:45 CET (UTC+1)	Guilavogui 7'; Kanté (yellow card) 45+1'	Report	Lachuer (yellow card) 90+2'	Stadium: Stade Sébastien Charléty; Referee: Gaël Angoula

19 January 2022 20	Amiens	0–1	Ajaccio	Amiens
19:00 CET (UTC+1)	Pavlović (yellow card) 54'; Mendy (yellow card) 66'; Zungu (yellow card) 66'	Report	Avinel (yellow card) 25'; Nouri 42'; Cimignani (yellow card) 87'	Stadium: Stade de la Licorne; Referee: Guillaume Paradis

22 January 2022 22	Amiens	3–0	Guingamp	Amiens
19:00 CET (UTC+1)	Badji 57', 63'; Akolo 84'	Report	Muyumba (yellow card) 71'	Stadium: Stade de la Licorne; Referee: Benjamin Lepaysant

26 January 2022 21	Quevilly-Rouen	1–1	Amiens	Rouen
19:00 CET (UTC+1)	Diaby (yellow card) 18'; S. Cissé (yellow card) 23'; Lambese (yellow card) 61'; Gbellé 74'	Report	Gnahoré 42'; Badji (yellow card) 67'	Stadium: Stade Robert Diochon; Referee: Abdelatifa Kherradji

5 February 2022 23	Sochaux	1–1	Amiens	Montbéliard
19:00 CET (UTC+1)	Do Couto 21'	Report	Badji 39'	Stadium: Stade Auguste Bonal; Referee: Frank Schneider

12 February 2022 24	Amiens	3–1	Niort	Amiens
19:00 CET (UTC+1)	Badji 13', 36'; Gene (yellow card) 19'; Pavlović (yellow card) 61'; Gnahoré 77'	Report	Sissoko 76'	Stadium: Stade de la Licorne; Referee: Alexandre Perreau Niel

19 February 2022 25	Rodez	1–1	Amiens	Rodez
19:00 CET (UTC+1)	Vilhjalmsson 40'; Celestine (yellow card) 72'	Report	Fofana (Mali) (yellow card) 18'; Celestine 24' (o.g.); Zungu (yellow card) 33'; Lusamba (yellow card) 45'; Badji (yellow card) 45+1'; Sangaré (yellow card) 90+3'	Stadium: Stade Paul-Lignon; Referee: Arnaud Baert

26 February 2022 26	Amiens	3–0	Nîmes	Amiens
19:00 CET (UTC+1)	Badji 32'; Arokodare 68', 83'; Xantippe (yellow card) 90'; Gene (yellow card) 90+1'	Report	Burner (yellow card) 22'; Valério (yellow card) 81'	Stadium: Stade de la Licorne; Referee: Marc Bollengier

5 March 2022 27	Pau	2–1	Amiens	Pau
19:00 CET (UTC+1)	Batisse (yellow card) 45+1'; Essende (yellow card) 63', (goal) 84'; El Melali 79'	Report	Pavlović 8'; Xantippe (yellow card) 57'; Zungu (yellow card) 66' (yellow-red card) 66'	Stadium: Nouste Camp; Referee: Pierre Legat

12 March 2022 28	Amiens	1–0	Nancy	Amiens
19:00 CET (UTC+1)	Akolo 81'	Report		Stadium: Stade de la Licorne; Referee: Gaël Angoula

15 March 2022 29	Toulouse	6–0	Amiens	Toulouse
19:00 CET (UTC+1)	Evitt-Healey 10', 70'; Mendy 12' (o.g.); Nicolaisen (yellow card) 18'; Ngoumou 30'; Van den Boomen 53'; Diarra (yellow card) 67'; Bangré 84'	Report	Sy (yellow card) 27'; Lomotey (yellow card) 30' (yellow-red card) 58'	Stadium: Stadium de Toulouse; Referee: Remi Landry

19 March 2022 30	Amiens	1–1	Dijon	Amiens
19:00 CET (UTC+1)	Bénet (yellow card) 64'; Bamba 71'	Report	Traoré (yellow card) 57'; Dossevi 90+2' (o.g.)	Stadium: Stade de la Licorne; Referee: Guillaume Paradis

2 April 2022 31	Valenciennes	0–2	Amiens	Valenciennes
19:00 CET (UTC+1)	Cuffaut (yellow card) 41'; Picouleau (yellow card) 67'	Report	Akolo 29', 33'	Stadium: Stade du Hainaut; Referee: Arnaud Baert

9 April 2022 32	Amiens	0–0	Bastia	Amiens
19:00 CET (UTC+1)	Gene (yellow card) 60'; Pavlović (yellow card) 90+3'	Report	Santelli (yellow card) 63'	Stadium: Stade de la Licorne; Referee: Benjamin Lepaysant

16 April 2022 33	Caen	1–1	Amiens	Caen
19:00 CEST (UTC+2)	Oniangué 52'	Report	Gene (yellow card) 56' (yellow-red card) 77'; Arokodare 59'; Zungu (yellow card) 74'; Pavlović (yellow card) 89'	Stadium: Stade Michel d'Ornano; Referee: Bartolomeu Varela

19 April 2022 34	Amiens	0–2	Le Havre	Amiens
19:00 CET (UTC+1)	Mendy (yellow card) 30'; Badji (yellow card) 42'; Bamba (yellow card) 69'	Report	Wahib (yellow card) 32'; Alioui 59'; Gibaud (yellow card) 69'; Sangante 73'	Stadium: Stade de la Licorne; Referee: Alexandre Perreau Niel

22 April 2022 35	Dunkerque	0–0	Amiens	Dunkirk
21:00 CEST (UTC+2)	Majouga (yellow card) 57'	Report		Stadium: Stade Marcel-Tribut; Referee: Olivier Thual

30 April 2022 36	Grenoble	1–1	Amiens	Grenoble
19:00 CEST (UTC+2)	Anani 39'; Gaspar (yellow card) 49'	Report	Pavlović (yellow card) 49'; Mandefu (yellow card) 53'; Badji 65'; Akolo (yellow card) 77'	Stadium: Stade des Alpes; Referee: Gaël Angoula

7 May 2022 37	Amiens SC	1–2	Paris FC	Amiens
19:00 CEST (UTC+2)	Arokodare (yellow card) 78'; Badji 78'; Bamba (yellow card) 82'; Fofana (Mali) (yellow card) 90+5'	Report	Chergui 50'; Camara (yellow card) 61'; Mandouki 71'; Hanin (yellow card) 82'; Alfarela (yellow card) 90+5'	Stadium: Stade de la Licorne; Referee: Alexandre Perreau Niel

14 May 2022 38	Auxerre	2–1	Amiens	Auxerre
19:00 CET (UTC+1)	Hein 33'; Charbonnier 62'	Report	Fofana (Fr.) (yellow card) 74'; Sangaré 82'	Stadium: Stade de l'Abbé-Deschamps; Referee: Aurelian Petit

=== Coupe de France ===
13 November 2021 Seventh round	ES Anzin-Saint-Aubin	0–5	Amiens	Arras
14:00 CET		Report	Arokodare 52', 59', 65'; Mendy 68'; Gnahoré 77'	Stadium: Stade Degouve-Brabant; Referee: Mehdi Mokhtari

27 November 2021 Eighth round	AC Cambrai	1–4	Amiens	Cambrai
18:00 CET	Martin 2'	Report	Bénet 6'; Arokodare 27'; Gene 44'; Badji 90'	Stadium: Stade de la Liberté; Referee: Cédric Dos Santos

18 December 2021 Round of 64	Guingamp	2–3	Amiens	Guingamp
16:00 CET	Livolant 63'; Gomis 73'	Report	Akolo 20', 45+1', 55'	Stadium: Stade de Roudourou; Referee: Romain Lissorgue

2 January 2022 Round of 32	ESA Linas-Montlhéry	3–3 (3–4 p)	Amiens	Montlhéry
18:30 CET	Bouvil 64', 70'; Sylla 90+2'	Report	Gnahoré 48'; Akolo 50'; Lahne 53'	Stadium: Stade Paul Desgouillon; Referee: Florent Batta
	Penalties
	Roca (penalty scored); Duval (penalty scored); Ngeyitala (penalty scored); Tchabo (penalty missed); Bouvil (penalty missed)		(penalty scored) Lachuer; (penalty scored) Zungu; (penalty scored) Sy; (penalty scored) Traoré

29 January 2022 Round of 16	Nancy	0–2	Amiens	Tomblaine
16:15 CET (UTC+1)		Report	Lusamba 15'; Arokodare 38'	Stadium: Stade Marcel Picot; Referee: Bastien Dechepy

8 February 2022 Quarter-finals	Monaco	2–0	Amiens	Monaco
21:00 CET (UTC+1)	Tchouaméni 5', (yellow card) 22'; Volland 54'	Report	Gene (yellow card) 11'; Badji (yellow card) 13'; Bénet (yellow card) 45'; Pavlović (yellow card) 60'	Stadium: Stade Louis II; Referee: Amaury Delerue
