= 2020–21 Amiens SC season =

Amiens SC
2020–21 season
- President: Bernard Joannin
- Head coach: Luka Elsner
- Stadium: Stade de la Licorne
- Ligue 2: 10th
- Coupe de France: Round of 64
- Top goalscorer: League: Stephen Odey (6); All: Stephen Odey (6)
| Home colours | Away colours |

The 2020–21 Amiens SC season was the club's 118th season in existence and the first season back in the second division of French football. In addition to the domestic league, Amiens participated in this season's edition of the Coupe de France. The season covered the period from 1 July 2020 to 30 June 2021.

== Players ==
=== First-team squad ===
As of 23 February 2021.

Note: Flags indicate national team as defined under FIFA eligibility rules; some limited exceptions apply. Players may hold more than one non-FIFA nationality.

| No. | Pos. | Nation | Player |
|---|---|---|---|
| 1 | GK | FRA | Régis Gurtner (Vice-captain) |
| 2 | DF | FRA | Prince-Désir Gouano (Captain) |
| 4 | DF | GHA | Nicholas Opoku (on loan from Udinese) |
| 5 | DF | MLI | Molla Wagué (on loan from FC Nantes) |
| 7 | FW | BFA | Abou Ouattara (on loan from Lille) |
| 8 | DF | SEN | Racine Coly (on loan from Nice) |
| 9 | FW | NGR | Stephen Odey |
| 10 | MF | FRA | Arnaud Lusamba |
| 11 | FW | FRA | Adama Diakhaby |
| 12 | DF | GHA | Emmanuel Lomotey |
| 13 | DF | GLP | Mickaël Alphonse |
| 14 | FW | SWE | Jack Lahne |
| 16 | GK | GLP | Yohann Thuram-Ulien |
| 17 | MF | FRA | Alexis Blin |

| No. | Pos. | Nation | Player |
|---|---|---|---|
| 20 | FW | COL | Stiven Mendoza |
| 21 | DF | COD | Nathan Monzango |
| 22 | MF | FRA | Iron Gomis |
| 23 | MF | SEN | Amadou Ciss |
| 24 | MF | CIV | Cheick Timité |
| 25 | DF | POR | Rafael Fonseca |
| 26 | MF | FRA | Jayson Papeau |
| 27 | FW | FRA | Mustapha Sangaré |
| 28 | MF | FRA | Gaoussou Traoré |
| 30 | GK | FRA | Grégoire Coudert |
| 31 | MF | FRA | Mathis Lachuer |
| 32 | FW | FRA | Darell Tokpa |
| 35 | DF | FRA | Valentin Gendrey |
| 36 | FW | FRA | Florian Bianchini |

=== Out on loan ===
Note: Flags indicate national team as defined under FIFA eligibility rules; some limited exceptions apply. Players may hold more than one non-FIFA nationality.

| No. | Pos. | Nation | Player |
|---|---|---|---|
| – | MF | COD | Chadrac Akolo (on loan at SC Paderborn) |
| – | MF | FRA | Jonathan Bumbu (on loan at Boulogne) |
| — | MF | FRA | Eddy Gnahoré (on loan at Wuhan Zall) |

| No. | Pos. | Nation | Player |
|---|---|---|---|
| – | FW | MAR | Driss Khalid (on loan at Orléans) |
| — | MF | RSA | Bongani Zungu (on loan at Rangers) |

== Pre-season and friendlies ==
Win Draw Loss

| 24 July 2020 Friendly | Amiens | 0–2 | US Boulogne | Le Touquet, France |
| 15:20 CEST (UTC+2) | | Report | Essimi 40'; Noc 73' | Stadium: Stade Gérard Houllier |

| 1 August 2020 Friendly | Amiens | 0–0 | Chambly | Amiens, France |
| 19:00 CEST (UTC+2) | | Report | | Stadium: Stade de la Licorne |

| 5 August 2020 Friendly | Amiens | 1–2 | Valenciennes | Amiens, France |
| 18:00 CEST (UTC+2) | Papeau 14' | Report | Gendrey 17' (o.g.); Chevalier 19' | Stadium: Stade de la Licorne |

| 8 August 2020 Friendly | Caen | 2–1 | Amiens | Caen, France |
| 18:00 CEST (UTC+2) | Bammou 30'; Nsona 38' | Report | Otero 83' | Stadium: Stade Michel d'Ornano |

| 15 August 2020 Friendly | Amiens | 1–2 | Troyes | Amiens, France |
| 19:00 CEST (UTC+2) | Ghoddos 60'; Gomis (red card) 62' | Report | Barthelmé 10'; Touzghar 54' | Stadium: Stade de la Licorne; Referee: Benjamin Lepaysant |

| 9 October 2020 Friendly | Chambly | 1–1 | Amiens | Chambly, France |
| 15:30 CEST (UTC+2) | Šušnjara 72' | | Konaté 75' (pen.) | Stadium: Stade des Marais |

== Competitions ==
=== Overview ===
| Competition | First match | Last match | Starting round | Final position | Record | | | | | | | |
| Competition | First match | Last match | Starting round | Final position | Pld | W | D | L | GF | GA | GD | Win % |
|---|---|---|---|---|---|---|---|---|---|---|---|---|
| Ligue 2 | 22 August 2020 | 15 May 2021 | Matchday 1 | 10th | 38 | 11 | 14 | 13 | 34 | 40 | −6 | 28.95 |
| Coupe de France | 20 January 2021 | 10 February 2021 | Eighth round | Round of 64 | 2 | 0 | 1 | 1 | 2 | 3 | −1 | 0.00 |
| Total | | | | | 40 | 11 | 15 | 14 | 36 | 43 | −7 | 27.50 |

Source: Soccerway

=== Ligue 2 ===
==== League table ====
| Pos | Team | Pld | W | D | L | GF | GA | GD | Pts |
|---|---|---|---|---|---|---|---|---|---|
| 8 | Nancy | 38 | 11 | 14 | 13 | 53 | 53 | 0 | 47 |
| 9 | Guingamp | 38 | 10 | 17 | 11 | 41 | 43 | −2 | 47 |
| 10 | Amiens | 38 | 11 | 14 | 13 | 34 | 40 | −6 | 47 |
| 11 | Valenciennes | 38 | 12 | 11 | 15 | 50 | 59 | −9 | 47 |
| 12 | Le Havre | 38 | 11 | 14 | 13 | 38 | 48 | −10 | 47 |

Source: Ligue 2
Rules for classification: 1) Points; 2) Goal difference; 3) Number of goals scored; 4) Head-to-head goal difference; 5) Fair play points

==== Results summary ====
| Overall | | | | | | | | Home | | | | | | Away | | | | | |
| Pld | W | D | L | GF | GA | GD | Pts | W | D | L | GF | GA | GD | W | D | L | GF | GA | GD |
|---|---|---|---|---|---|---|---|---|---|---|---|---|---|---|---|---|---|---|---|
| 38 | 11 | 14 | 13 | 34 | 40 | −6 | 47 | 7 | 8 | 4 | 15 | 12 | +3 | 4 | 6 | 9 | 19 | 28 | −9 |

Source: Ligue 2

==== Results by round ====
| Round | 1 | 2 | 3 | 4 | 5 | 6 | 7 | 8 | 9 | 10 | 11 | 12 | 13 | 14 | 15 | 16 | 17 | 18 | 19 | 20 | 21 | 22 | 23 | 24 | 25 | 26 | 27 | 28 | 29 | 30 | 31 | 32 | 33 | 34 | 35 | 36 | 37 | 38 |
|---|---|---|---|---|---|---|---|---|---|---|---|---|---|---|---|---|---|---|---|---|---|---|---|---|---|---|---|---|---|---|---|---|---|---|---|---|---|---|
| Ground | H | A | H | A | H | A | H | A | H | A | H | A | H | A | H | A | H | A | A | H | A | H | A | H | A | H | A | H | A | H | A | H | A | H | A | H | H | A |
| Result | W | L | L | D | D | L | W | W | L | L | D | L | W | W | D | W | D | D | W | D | L | W | L | D | D | L | L | D | L | W | D | W | L | W | D | L | D | D |
| Position | 9 | 11 | 13 | 15 | 15 | 17 | 16 | 12 | 13 | 15 | 14 | 14 | 13 | 12 | 12 | 9 | 10 | 10 | 9 | 8 | 9 | 8 | 8 | 9 | 8 | 11 | 11 | 11 | 13 | 10 | 14 | 10 | 11 | 9 | 9 | 10 | 10 | 10 |

Source: Ligue 2
A = Away; H = Home; W = Win; D = Draw; L = Loss

==== Matches ====
The league fixtures were announced on 9 July 2020.

| 22 August 2020 1 | Amiens | 1–0 | Nancy | Amiens |
| 19:00 CEST (UTC+2) | Guirassy 71' | Report | | Stadium: Stade de la Licorne; Referee: Romain Lissorgue |

| 29 August 2020 2 | Le Havre | 1–0 | Amiens | Le Havre |
| 19:00 CEST (UTC+2) | Monzango 44' (o.g.) | Report | | Stadium: Stade Océane; Referee: Sylvain Palhies |

| 12 September 2020 3 | Amiens | 1–2 | Paris FC | Amiens |
| 19:00 CEST (UTC+2) | Mendoza 71' (pen.) | Report | López 40'; Name 57' | Stadium: Stade de la Licorne; Referee: Arnaud Baert |

| 19 September 2020 4 | Châteauroux | 0–0 | Amiens | Châteauroux |
| 19:00 CEST (UTC+2) | | Report | | Stadium: Stade Gaston Petit; Attendance: 4,612; Referee: Alexandre Perreau Niel |

| 26 September 2020 5 | Amiens | 0–0 | Pau | Amiens |
| 19:00 CEST (UTC+2) | | Report | | Stadium: Stade de la Licorne; Attendance: 4,724; Referee: Guillaume Paradis |

| 3 October 2020 6 | Caen | 1–0 | Amiens | Caen |
| 15:30 CEST (UTC+2) | Gioacchini 42' | Report | | Stadium: Stade Michel d'Ornano; Attendance: 0 Referee: Jérémy Stinat |

| 17 October 2020 7 | Amiens | 1–0 | Grenoble | Amiens |
| 19:00 CEST (UTC+2) | Odey 64' | Report | | Stadium: Stade de la Licorne; Attendance: 0 Referee: Stéphanie Frappart |

| 26 October 2020 8 | Sochaux | 0–2 | Amiens | Montbéliard |
| 20:45 CET (UTC+1) | | Report | | Stadium: Stade Auguste Bonal; Attendance: 0 Referee: Jeremy Stinat |

| 2 November 2020 9 | Amiens | 0–1 | Toulouse | Amiens |
| 20:45 CET (UTC+1) | | Report | Spierings 55' | Stadium: Stade de la Licorne; Attendance: 0 Referee: Alexandre Perreau Niel |

| 7 November 2020 10 | Auxerre | 2–1 | Amiens | Auxerre |
| 19:00 CET (UTC+1) | Sakhi 44'; Duigmont 57' | Report | Timité 77' | Stadium: Stade de l'Abbé-Deschamps; Attendance: 0 Referee: Abdelatif Kherradji |

| 21 November 2020 11 | Amiens | 1–1 | Clermont | Amiens |
| 19:00 CET (UTC+1) | Zedadka 45' (o.g.) | Report | Bayo 67' | Stadium: Stade de la Licorne; Attendance: 0 Referee: Guillaume Paradis |

| 28 November 2020 12 | Troyes | 2–1 | Amiens | Troyes |
| 19:00 CET (UTC+1) | | Report | | Stadium: Stade de l'Aube; Attendance: 0 Referee: Romain Delpech |

| 1 December 2020 13 | Amiens | 1–0 | Dunkerque | Amiens |
| 19:00 CET (UTC+1) | Odey 13' | Report | | Stadium: Stade de la Licorne; Attendance: 0 Referee: Arnaud Baert |

| 5 December 2020 14 | Rodez | 1–2 | Amiens | Rodez |
| 19:00 CET (UTC+1) | | Report | | Stadium: Stade Paul-Lignon; Attendance: 0 Referee: Mehdi Mokhtari |

| 12 December 2020 15 | Amiens | 1–1 | Chambly | Amiens |
| 19:00 CET (UTC+1) | | Report | | Stadium: Stade de la Licorne; Attendance: 0 Referee: Stéphanie Frappart |

| 18 December 2020 16 | Valenciennes | 0–2 | Amiens | Valenciennes |
| 20:00 CET (UTC+1) | | Report | Alphonse 81'; Gomis 85' | Stadium: Stade du Hainaut; Attendance: 0 Referee: Alexandre Perreau Niel |

| 22 December 2020 17 | Amiens | 0–0 | Ajaccio | Amiens |
| 20:00 CET (UTC+1) | | Report | | Stadium: Stade de la Licorne; Attendance: 0 Referee: Nicolas Rainville |

| 5 January 2021 18 | Guingamp | 2–2 | Amiens | Guingamp |
| 20:00 CET (UTC+1) | | Report | | Stadium: Stade du Roudourou; Attendance: 0 Referee: Benjamin Lepaysant |

| 8 January 2021 19 | Niort | 0–2 | Amiens | Niort |
| 19:00 CET (UTC+1) | | Report | | Stadium: Stade René Gaillard; Attendance: 0 Referee: Arnaud Baert |

| 16 January 2021 20 | Amiens | 0–0 | Le Havre | Amiens |
| 19:00 CET (UTC+1) | | Report | | Stadium: Stade de la Licorne; Attendance: 0 Referee: Gaël Angoula |

| 23 January 2021 21 | Paris FC | 4–2 | Amiens | Paris |
| 19:00 CET (UTC+1) | | Report | | Stadium: Stade Charléty; Attendance: 0 Referee: Bartolomeu Varela |

| 30 January 2021 22 | Amiens | 1–0 | Châteauroux | Amiens |
| 19:00 CET (UTC+1) | Odey 38' | Report | | Stadium: Stade de la Licorne; Attendance: 0 Referee: Romain Lissorgue |

| 2 February 2021 23 | Pau | 2–0 | Amiens | Pau |
| 20:00 CET (UTC+1) | | Report | | Stadium: Stade du Hameau; Attendance: 0 Referee: Rémi Landry |

| 5 February 2021 24 | Amiens | 0–0 | Caen | Amiens |
| 20:00 CET (UTC+1) | | Report | | Stadium: Stade de la Licorne; Attendance: 0 Referee: Pierre Gaillouste |

| 13 February 2021 25 | Grenoble | 0–0 | Amiens | Grenoble |
| 19:00 CET (UTC+1) | | Report | | Stadium: Stade des Alpes; Attendance: 0 Referee: Romain Delpech |

| 20 February 2021 26 | Amiens | 0–1 | Sochaux | Amiens |
| 19:00 CET (UTC+1) | | Report | | Stadium: Stade de la Licorne; Attendance: 0 Referee: Abdelatif Kherradji |

| 27 February 2021 27 | Toulouse | 3–0 | Amiens | Toulouse |
| 15:00 CET (UTC+1) | Healey 15'; Spierings 41' (pen.); Bayo 86' | Report | | Stadium: Stadium de Toulouse; Attendance: 0 Referee: Eric Wattellier |

| 2 March 2021 28 | Amiens | 1–1 | Auxerre | Amiens |
| 20:00 CET (UTC+1) | Lomotey 29'; Opoku (yellow card) 60' | Report | Le Bihan 12' | Stadium: Stade de la Licorne; Attendance: 0 Referee: Romain Lissorgue |

| 20 March 2021 30 | Amiens | 3–1 | Troyes | Amiens |
| 15:00 CET (UTC+1) | Wagué (yellow card) 24'; Lomotey 54'; Gomis 40'; Ciss (yellow card) 73'; Blin 78' | Report | Kouamé 15', (yellow card) 22'; Giraudon (red card) 45'; Bozok (yellow card) 82'; Tardieu (yellow card) 90+2' | Stadium: Stade de la Licorne; Referee: Benjamin Lepaysant |

| 11 April 2021 32 | Amiens | 1–0 | Rodez | Amiens |
| 19:00 CEST (UTC+2) | Lusamba (yellow card) 44'; Timité (yellow card) 59', (goal) 60'; Gurtner (yellow card) 89'; Papeau (yellow card) 90+2' | Report | Douline (yellow card) 41'; Henry (yellow card) 90+1' (yellow-red card) 90+5' | Stadium: Stade de la Licorne; Referee: Abdelatif Kherradji |

| 14 April 2021 29 | Clermont | 3–0 | Amiens | Clermont-Ferrand |
| 20:00 CET (UTC+1) | Dossou 7'; Gomis (yellow card) 58'; Bayo 70'; Gastien 86' | Report | | Stadium: Stade Gabriel Montpied; Referee: Gaël Angoula |
Note: Reschedule of postponed 13 March 2021 match.

| 17 April 2021 33 | Chambly | 2–0 | Amiens | Chambly |
| 20:00 CEST (UTC+2) | Heinry (yellow card) 17'; Soubervie (yellow card) 22'; Petković 31'; Correa (yellow card) 44'; Doucouré 45+4' | Report | Blin (yellow card) 31'; Lachuer (yellow card) 38'; Alphonse (yellow card) 58' | Stadium: Stade des Marais; Referee: Arnaud Baert |

| 20 April 2021 34 | Amiens | 3–1 | Valenciennes | Amiens |
| 20:00 CET (UTC+1) | Lusamba (yellow card) 45+1', (goal) 64' (pen.); Odey (yellow card) 80', (goal) 90+4'; Alphonse 90+2' | Report | Abeid (yellow card) 19'; Guillaume (yellow card) 62'; Doukouré (yellow card) 76'; Cuffaut 90+1' (pen.) | Stadium: Stade de la Licorne; Referee: Benjamin Lepaysant |

| 24 April 2021 35 | Ajaccio | 2–2 | Amiens | Ajaccio |
| 19:00 CEST (UTC+2) | Moussiti-Oko (yellow card) 4' (yellow-red card) 61', (goal) 48'; Courtet 39' (pen.); Coutadeur (yellow card) 85' | Report | Monzango (yellow card) 6'; Timité 25'; Diakhaby 90+3' | Stadium: Stade François Coty; Referee: Karim Abed |

| 28 April 2021 31 | Dunkerque | 1–1 | Amiens | Dunkerque |
| 19:00 CET (UTC+1) | Dudouit (yellow card) 30'; Kebbal 47' | Report | Papeau 23' | Stadium: Stade Marcel-Tribut; Referee: Mathieu Vernice |
Note: Re-schedule of match postponed from 3 April due to covid positives among the Amiens roster.

| 1 May 2021 36 | Amiens | 0–3 | Guingamp | Amiens |
| 20:00 CET (UTC+1) | Papeau (yellow card) 35' | Report | M'Changama 8', 33'; Pierrot 62' | Stadium: Stade de la Licorne; Referee: Rémi Landry |

| 8 May 2021 37 | Amiens | 0–0 | Niort | Amiens |
| 20:00 CET (UTC+1) | Lusamba (red card) 14'; Lomotey (yellow card) 48'; Odey (yellow card) 90+3' | Report | Matufueni (yellow card) 46' | Stadium: Stade de la Licorne; Referee: Jeremy Stinat |

| 15 May 2021 38 | Nancy | 2–2 | Amiens | Tomblaine |
| 20:00 CEST (UTC+2) | Wooh 60', 90+3' | Report | Yatabaré (yellow card) 26'; Odey 45', 46' | Stadium: Stade Marcel Picot; Referee: Sylvain Palhies |

=== Coupe de France ===
| 19 January 2021 Eighth round | Dunkerque | 1–1 (2–4 p) | Amiens | Dunkirk |
| 18:00 CET (UTC+1) | Tchokounté 81' | Report | Blin 43' | Stadium: Stade Marcel Tribut; Attendance: 0 Referee: Sylvain Palhies |
| | Penalties |
| | Romil (penalty scored); Dudouit (penalty scored); Bosca (penalty missed); Tchokounté (penalty missed) | | (penalty missed) Lomotey; (penalty scored) Sangaré; (penalty scored) Ciss; (penalty scored) Bianchini; (penalty scored) Akolo |

| 10 February 2021 Round of 64 | Amiens | 1–2 | Metz | Amiens |
| 17:00 CET (UTC+1) | Wagué (yellow card) 32'; Blin 53'; Lachuer (yellow card) 54'; Yatabaré (yellow card) 90+3' | Report | Leya Iseka 1'; Vagner 90+4' (pen.) | Stadium: Stade de la Licorne; Attendance: 0 Referee: Olivier Thual |

== Statistics ==
=== Goalscorers ===
As of 22 August 2020

| Rank | No. | Pos | Nat | Name | Ligue 2 | Coupe de France | Total |
|---|---|---|---|---|---|---|---|
| 1 | 9 | FW | (France) | Serhou Guirassy | 1 | 0 | 1 |
| Totals | | | | | 1 | 0 | 1 |
