= Lachuer =

Lachuer is a surname. Notable people with the surname include:

- Julien Lachuer (born 1976), French football goalkeeper and manager, brother of Yann and father of Mathis
- Mathis Lachuer (born 2000), French football midfielder, son of Julien and nephew of Yann
- Yann Lachuer (born 1972), French football midfielder and manager, brother of Julien and uncle of Mathis
