= Raphaël Le Guen =

French footballer (born 2006)

Personal information
- Full name: Raphaël Marc Le Guen
- Date of birth: 1 September 2006 (age 20)
- Place of birth: Quimper, France
- Height: 1.98 m (6 ft 6 in)
- Position: Centre-back

Team information
- Current team: Brest
- Number: 36

Youth career
- Châteaulin FC
- –2025: Brest

Senior career*
Years	Team	Apps	(Gls)
2024–	Brest	6	(0)
2025–	Brest B	12	(0)
- * Club domestic league appearances and goals as of 19 May 2026

Raphaël Marc Le Guen (born 1 September 2006) is a French professional footballer who plays as a centre-back for Ligue 1 club Brest.

== Early life ==
Le Guen was born into a family of sports players, with both of his older brothers Mathias and Nathanaël playing football at Châteaulin FC, the club that Le Guen would join at the age of eight.

== Career ==
At the age of thirteen, Le Guen joined the youth academy of professional club Brest. In the 2023–24 season, while an under-19 player, he participated in his first training sessions with the club's first team. He participated in the pre-season ahead of the 2025–26 season, and made his professional debut as a substitute in a 3–1 defeat away to Lens on 29 August 2025. On 21 January 2026, Le Guen signed a professional contract with Brest until June 2029.
