= Chadrac Akolo =

Congolese footballer (born 1995)

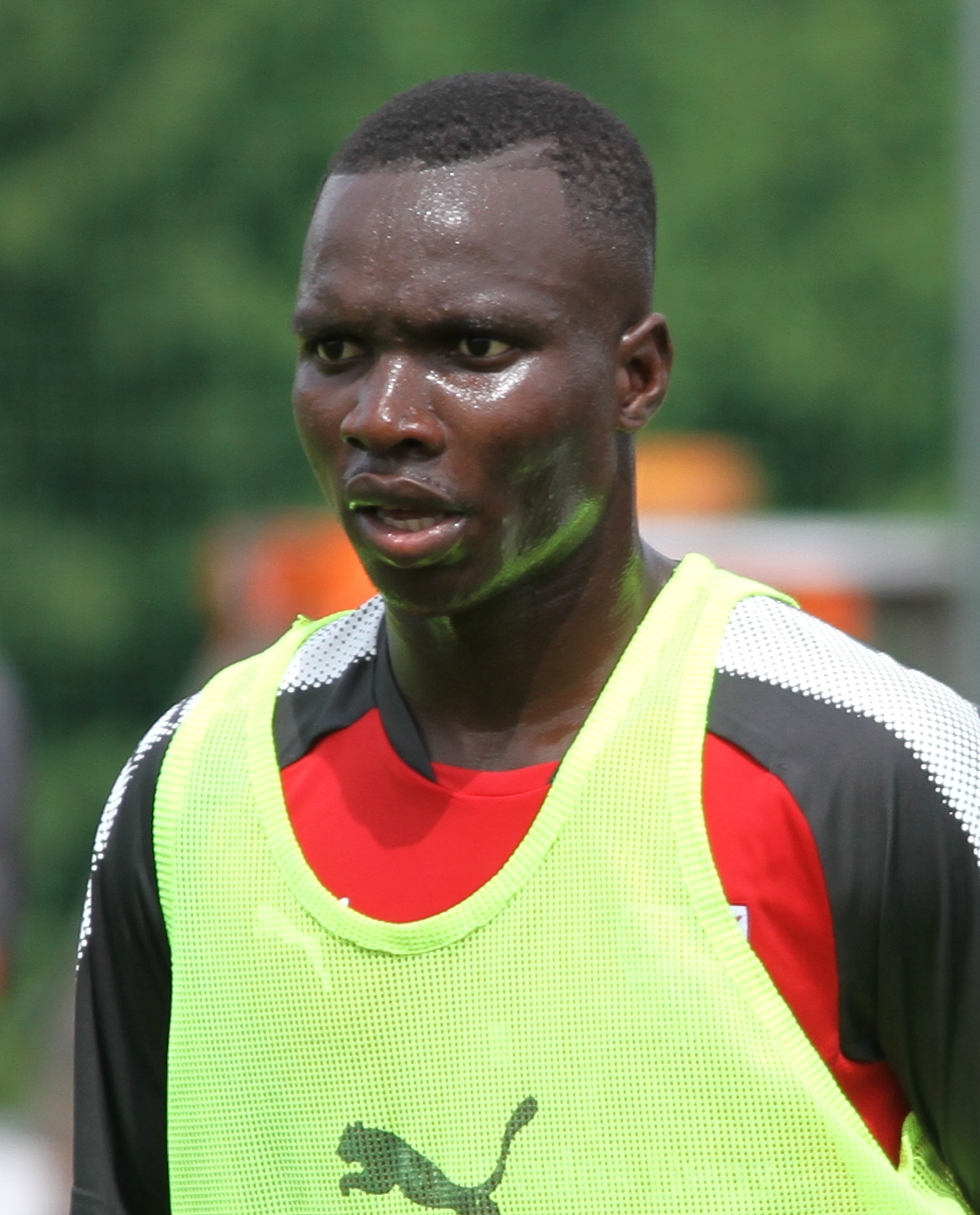
- Akolo training with VfB Stuttgart in 2017

Personal information
- Full name: Chadrac Akolo Ababa
- Date of birth: 1 April 1995 (age 31)
- Place of birth: Kinshasa, Zaire
- Height: 1.72 m (5 ft 8 in)
- Position: Forward

Team information
- Current team: Beijing Guoan
- Number: 77

Senior career*
Years	Team	Apps	(Gls)
2014–2017	Sion	58	(18)
2016	→ Neuchâtel Xamax (loan)	16	(9)
2017–2019	VfB Stuttgart	38	(5)
2019–2022	Amiens	61	(10)
2021	→ SC Paderborn (loan)	8	(1)
2022–2025	St. Gallen	100	(27)
2025–2026	Thep Xanh Nam Dinh	11	(4)
2026–	Beijing Guoan	4	(2)

International career^{‡}
2017–	DR Congo	27	(2)
- * Club domestic league appearances and goals as of 19 November 2026 ‡ National team caps and goals as of 17:37, 6 October 2024 (UTC)

Chadrac Akolo Ababa (born 1 April 1995) is a Congolese professional footballer who plays as forward for Chinese Super League club Beijing Guoan and the DR Congo national team.

== Early life and childhood ==
Born in the DR Congo, Akolo left the country with his family due to the political upheaval there and journeyed across the Mediterranean, arriving in Switzerland at age 14. It was there he caught the eye of FC Sion of the Swiss Super League.

== Club career ==
On 1 February 2016, Kinshasa-born Akolo joined Neuchâtel Xamax on loan until the end of the 2015–16 season.

On 9 July 2017, Akolo signed a four-year deal with VfB Stuttgart.

In July 2019, he moved to Amiens SC.

He joined SC Paderborn on loan until the end of the season in February 2021.

On 3 July 2022, Akolo moved to St. Gallen in Switzerland on a two-year contract.

On 7 October 2025, Akolo signed for Vietnamese club Thep Xanh Nam Dinh alongside his fellow countryman Arnaud Lusamba.

On 22 July 2026, Akolo joined Chinese Super League club Beijing Guoan.

== International career ==
Akolo made his debut for the DR Congo national team in a 2–2 2018 FIFA World Cup qualification tie with Tunisia on 5 September 2017.

== Career statistics ==
=== Club ===
As of match played 6 May 2026

Appearances and goals by club, season and competition
Club	Season	League			National cup (Note: Includes Swiss Cup, DFB-Pokal, Coupe de France, Vietnamese Cup)		League cup (Note: Includes Coupe de la Ligue)		Continental		Total	
Club	Season	Division	Apps	Goals	Apps	Goals	Apps	Goals	Apps	Goals	Apps	Goals
U-21 Sion	2012–13	1. Liga Promotion	3	1	–		–		–		3	1
U-21 Sion	2013–14	1. Liga Promotion	20	7	–		–		–		20	7
U-21 Sion	2014–15	1. Liga Promotion	12	7	–		–		–		12	7
U-21 Sion	2015–16	1. Liga Promotion	3	2	–		–		–		3	2
U-21 Sion	Total		38	17	–		–		–		38	17
Sion	2013–14	Swiss Super League	2	0	0	0	–		–		2	0
Sion	2014–15	Swiss Super League	16	0	2	0	–		–		18	0
Sion	2015–16	Swiss Super League	7	0	2	0	–		–		9	0
Sion	2016–17	Swiss Super League	34	15	6	3	–		–		40	18
Sion	Total		59	15	10	3	–		–		69	18
Neuchâtel Xamax (loan)	2015–16	Swiss Challenge League	16	9	–		–		–		16	9
VfB Stuttgart	2017–18	Bundesliga	22	5	3	1	–		–		25	6
VfB Stuttgart	2018–19	Bundesliga	18	0	1	0	–		–		19	0
VfB Stuttgart	Total		40	5	4	1	–		–		44	6
Amiens	2019–20	Ligue 2	15	2	0	0	1	0	–		16	2
Amiens	2020–21	Ligue 2	13	2	1	0	–		–		14	2
Amiens	2021–22	Ligue 2	33	6	5	4	–		–		38	10
Amiens	Total		61	10	6	4	1	0	–		68	14
Paderborn (loan)	2020–21	2. Bundesliga	8	1	–		–		–		8	1
St. Gallen	2022–23	Swiss Super League	32	7	4	5	–		–		36	12
St. Gallen	2023–24	Swiss Super League	37	14	2	1	–		–		39	15
St. Gallen	2024–25	Swiss Super League	31	6	1	0	–		11 (Note: Appearances in UEFA Conference League)	5	43	11
St. Gallen	Total		100	27	7	6	–		11	5	118	38
Thep Xanh Nam Dinh	2025–26	V.League 1	11	4	1	1	–		2 (Note: Appearances in ASEAN Club Championship)	0	10	5
Career total			340	88	28	15	1	0	12	5	371	109

=== International ===
As of match played 9 September 2024

Appearances and goals by national team and year
National team	Year	Apps	Goals
DR Congo	2017	1	0
DR Congo	2018	3	0
DR Congo	2019	7	1
DR Congo	2021	7	1
DR Congo	2022	3	0
DR Congo	2023	3	0
DR Congo	2024	3	0
Total		27	2

Scores and results list DR Congo's goal tally first, score column indicates score after each Akolo goal.

List of international goals scored by Chadrac Akolo
No.	Date	Venue	Cap	Opponent	Score	Result	Competition
1	13 October 2019	Stade de la Licorne, Amiens, France	10	Ivory Coast	1–2	1–3	Friendly
2	7 October 2021	Stade des Martyrs, Kinshasa, DR Congo	16	Madagascar	1–0	2–0	2022 FIFA World Cup qualification

== Honours ==
Individual

- Swiss Cup top scorer: 2022–23 (shared)
