= Jack Lahne =

Zambian footballer (born 2001)

Personal information
- Full name: Jack Daniel Kalichi Lahne
- Date of birth: 24 October 2001 (age 25)
- Place of birth: Lusaka, Zambia
- Height: 1.74 m (5 ft 9 in)
- Position: Striker

Youth career
- 2007–2017: Brommapojkarna

Senior career*
Years	Team	Apps	(Gls)
2017–2019	Brommapojkarna	25	(5)
2019	→ Amiens (loan)	0	(0)
2019–2024	Amiens B	5	(2)
2019–2024	Amiens	26	(4)
2019	→ AIK (loan)	9	(1)
2020	→ Örebro (loan)	10	(0)
2021	→ Häcken (loan)	0	(0)
2022	→ Botev Plovdiv (loan)	10	(2)
2022	→ Botev Plovdiv II (loan)	2	(1)
2022	→ Újpest (loan)	6	(0)
2023	→ Start (loan)	3	(1)
2024	Egersund	13	(2)
2025–2026	Austria Lustenau	41	(12)

International career
2016–2018	Sweden U17	18	(6)
2018–2019	Sweden U19	12	(4)
2025–	Zambia	1	(0)
- * Club domestic league appearances and goals as of 6 July 2026

Jack Daniel Kalichi Lahne (Swedish pronunciation: [ˈjakː ˈlɑ̂ːnɛ]; born 24 October 2001) is a professional footballer who plays as a striker. A former youth international for Sweden, he plays for the Zambia national team.

== Club career ==
=== Brommapojkarna ===
Jack made his senior debut for Brommapojkarna at the age of 15 in a Svenska Cupen game against Norrköping in March 2017. Lahne made his Superettan debut for Brommapojkarna during Summer 2017. He scored his first goal for Brommapojkarna in a Superettan game against Åtvidaberg in July 2017, making him Brommapojkarna's youngest ever goalscorer at the age of 15 years and 271 days. At the end of the 2017 Superettan season, Brommapojkarna won promotion to Allsvenskan.

During the 2018 Allsvenskan season, Jack Lahne scored 4 goals in 19 games as Brommapojkarna were relegated back to Superettan after losing in the relegation playoffs against AFC Eskilstuna, in which Lahne scored one goal.

=== Amiens ===
In January 2019, Lahne joined Amiens on loan until the end of the 2018–19 Ligue 1 season. On deadline day, 4 April 2019, however, the loan deal was converted to a permanent transfer, before Lahne had had the chance to play for Amiens.

Lahne scored his first Ligue 1 goal for Amiens in a game against Montpellier on 30 November 2019, which was also his debut.

==== Loan to AIK ====
On 4 April 2019, the same day SC Amiens purchased Lahne, it was announced the club had agreed to loan Lahne to reigning Allsvenskan champions AIK until 31 July 2019. Lahne made his Allsvenskan debut for AIK on 8 April 2019, coming on as a substitute for Saku Ylätupa in a 0–0 draw against IFK Norrköping. On 14 April 2019 in an Allsvenskan game against IK Sirius, Lahne scored his first goal for AIK in a 2–1 win. On 1 July 2019, Amiens exercised their option to end Lahne's loan deal with AIK prematurely.

==== Loan to Örebro ====
On 28 February 2020, Lahne joined Örebro SK on loan until the summer of 2020. He made his competitive debut for Örebro in a 2019–20 Svenska Cupen game against IF Elfsborg in February 2020. He played in 10 Allsvenskan games without scoring before returning to Amiens on 31 July 2020.

==== Loan to Häcken ====
On 4 March 2021, Lahne joined Häcken on loan for the 2021 Allsvenskan season.

==== Loan to Újpest ====
On 28 July 2022, Lahne signed for Hungarian club Újpest on loan.

==== Loan to Start ====
In February 2023, Lahne signed for Norwegian First Division club Start on loan for the 2023 season.

=== Egersund ===
On 29 July 2024, Lahne returned to the Norwegian First Division, joining Egersund on a permanent deal following his departure from Amiens.

== International career ==
Lahne has made a total of 30 appearances for the Sweden U17 and U19 teams. He was called up to the Zambia national team for a set of friendlies in November 2025.

On 10 December 2025, Lahne was called up to the Zambia squad for the 2025 Africa Cup of Nations.

== Personal life ==
Lahne was adopted to Sweden from Zambia at an early age.

== Career statistics ==
As of 28 July 2022

Appearances and goals by club, season and competition
Club	Season	League			Cup		Other		Total	
Club	Season	Division	Apps	Goals	Apps	Goals	Apps	Goals	Apps	Goals
Brommapojkarna	2017	Superettan	6	1	2	0	—		8	1
Brommapojkarna	2018	Allsvenskan	19	4	1	1	2 (Note: Appearances in the 2018 Allsvenskan Play-offs)	1	22	6
Brommapojkarna	Total		25	5	3	1	2	1	30	7
Amiens (loan)	2018–19	Ligue 1	0	0	0	0	—		0	0
AIK (loan)	2019	Allsvenskan	9	1	0	0	0	0	9	1
Amiens B	2019–20	National 3	4	2	—		—		4	2
Amiens B	2021–22	National 3	1	0	—		—		1	0
Amiens B	Total		5	2	—		—		5	2
Amiens	2019–20	Ligue 1	1	1	0	0	1 (Note: Appearance in the Coupe de la Ligue)	0	2	1
Amiens	2020–21	Ligue 2	4	0	0	0	—		4	0
Amiens	2021–22	Ligue 2	10	2	2	1	—		12	3
Amiens	Total		15	3	2	1	1	0	18	4
Örebro (loan)	2020	Allsvenskan	10	0	1	0	—		11	0
Häcken (loan)	2021	Allsvenskan	0	0	2	0	0	0	2	0
Botev Plovdiv (loan)	2021–22	First League	10	2	0	0	—		10	2
Botev Plovdiv II (loan)	2021–22	Second League	2	1	—		—		2	1
Újpest (loan)	2022–23	Nemzeti Bajnokság I	0	0	0	0	—		0	0
Career total			76	14	8	2	3	1	87	17

== Honours ==
Individual

- Bulgarian First League Goal of the Week: 2021–22 (Week 22) v. Lokomotiv Plovdiv
