= Alain de Martigny =

French footballer and manager (born 1946)

Personal information
- Full name: Alain Millard De Martigny
- Date of birth: 9 April 1946 (age 80)
- Place of birth: Paris, France
- Position: Midfielder

Senior career*
Years	Team	Apps	(Gls)
- Cambrai
1966–1976	Lille		
1976–1979	Brest		

Managerial career
- 1976–1982: Brest
- 1982–1984: RC Paris
- 1985–1986: Gabon
- 1987–1989: AS Sogara
- 1990–1993: Guingamp
- 1993–1994: Angers
- 1998–1999: Meaux
- 1999–2002: Brest
- * Club domestic league appearances and goals

Alain de Martigny (born 9 April 1946) is a French football manager and former player.

He played for Cambrai, Lille and Brest.

He coached Brest, RC Paris, the Gabon national team, AS Sogara, Guingamp, Angers and Meaux.
