= Armand Fouillen =

French footballer (1933–2024)

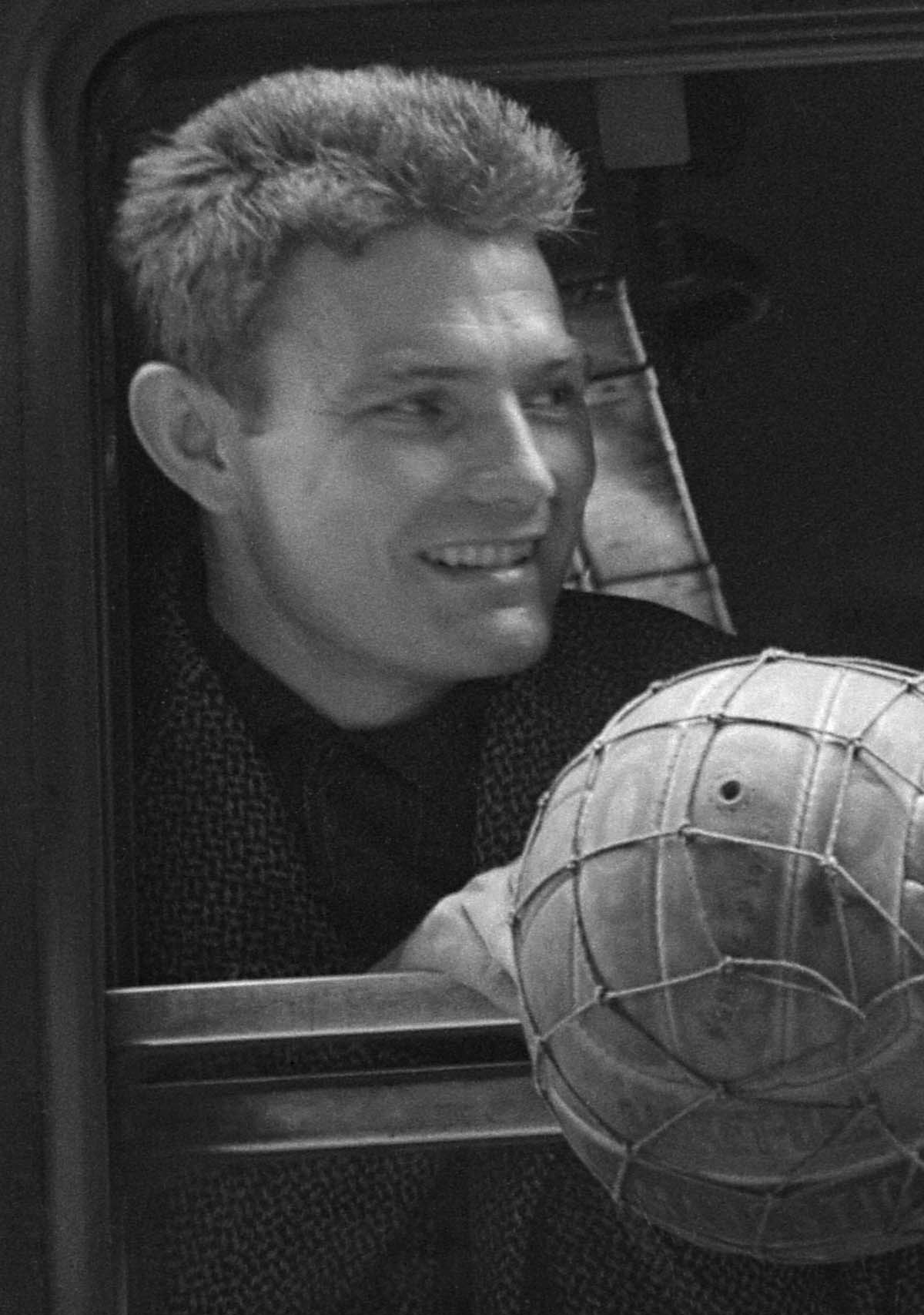
- Fouillen in 1958–1959

Personal information
- Date of birth: 17 January 1933
- Place of birth: Lorient, France
- Date of death: 17 June 2024 (aged 91)
- Place of death: Telgruc-sur-Mer, France
- Height: 1.75 m (5 ft 9 in)
- Position: Forward

Senior career*
Years	Team	Apps	(Gls)
–1956	CEP Lorient		
1956–1957	Saint-Étienne	13	(5)
1957–1958	Valenciennes	32	(9)
1958–1959	Toulouse FC	25	(3)
1959–1960	Red Star	26	(23)
1960–1961	Rennes	16	(2)
1961–1964	AS Cherbourg	80	(38)
Total		192	(80)

Managerial career
- 1964–1973: Brest (assistant)
- 1973–1976: Brest
- AS Brest
- * Club domestic league appearances and goals

Armand Fouillen (17 January 1933 – 17 June 2024) was a French footballer who played as a forward. He also coached for Stade Brestois 29 and AS Brest.

Fouillen won the Challenge des Champions in 1957 with Saint-Étienne. He died on 17 June 2024, at the age of 91.
