= Yohann Thuram-Ulien =

Guadeloupean footballer (born 1988)

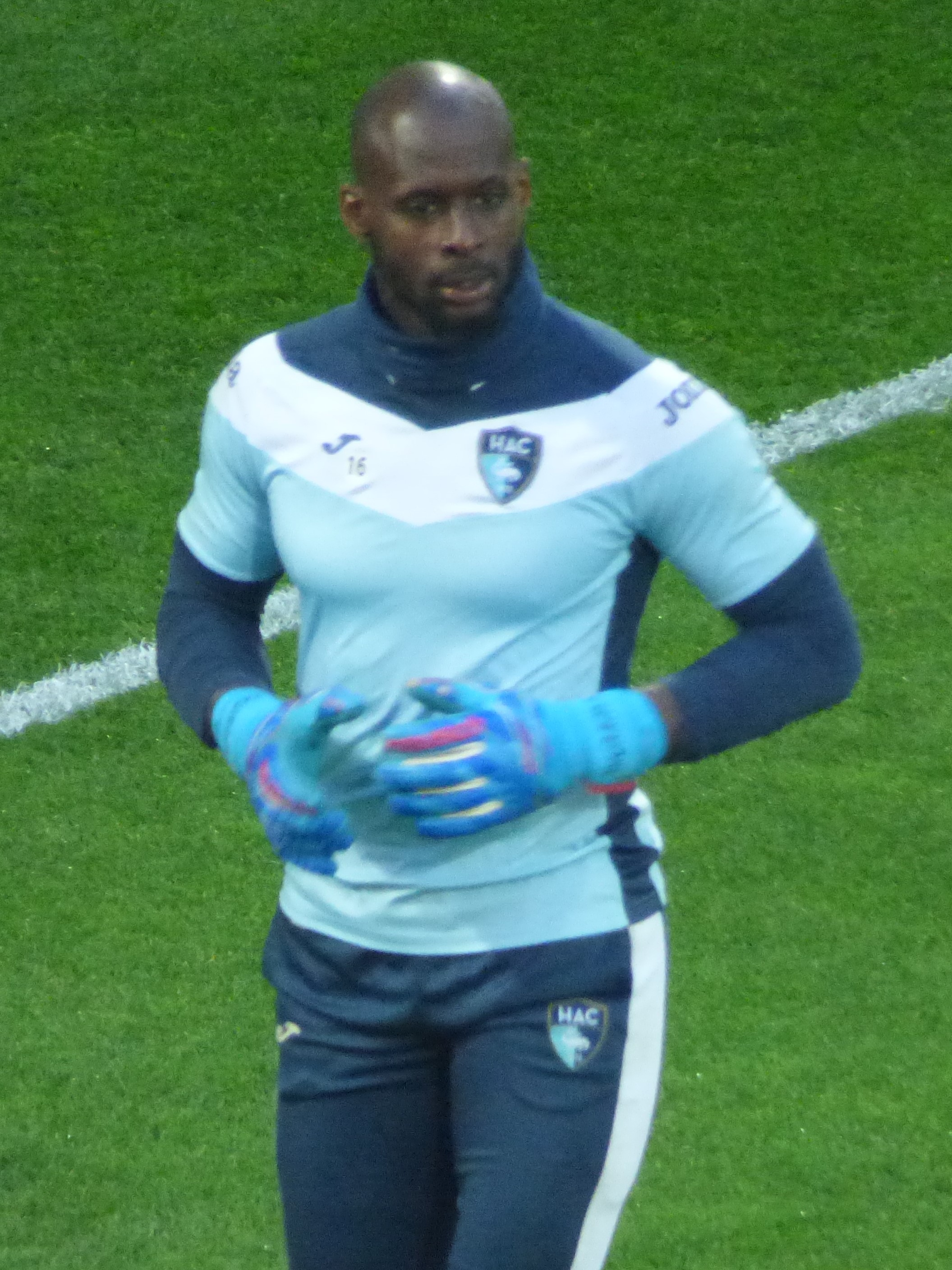
- Thuram in 2019

Personal information
- Full name: Yohann Georges Thuram-Ulien
- Date of birth: 31 October 1988 (age 38)
- Place of birth: Courcouronnes, France
- Height: 1.88 m (6 ft 2 in)
- Position: Goalkeeper

Youth career
- 1997–1998: Bourdons Esnouveaux
- 1998–2003: Phare du Canal
- 2003–2008: Monaco

Senior career*
Years	Team	Apps	(Gls)
2008–2011	Monaco	4	(0)
2010–2011	→ Tours (loan)	18	(0)
2011–2013	Troyes	59	(0)
2013–2016	Standard Liège	44	(0)
2014	→ Charlton Athletic (loan)	4	(0)
2016–2019	Le Havre	67	(0)
2019–2020	Le Mans	8	(0)
2020–2022	Amiens	6	(0)
2022–2023	Quevilly-Rouen	7	(0)
2023	Quevilly-Rouen II	1	(0)
Total		218	(0)

International career
2010	France U20	3	(0)
2009	France U21	2	(0)
2009	France U21 Futsal	2	(0)
2016–2022	Guadeloupe	10	(0)
- * Club domestic league appearances and goals

Yohann Georges Thuram-Ulien (born 31 October 1988) is a professional footballer who plays as a goalkeeper. Born in metropolitan France, he represented Guadeloupe at international level.

== Club career ==
Although Thuram-Ulien was born in Courcouronnes, France, he spent most of his childhood in Guadeloupe. He arrived at Monaco in 2003. He was a part of Monaco's 2007–08 CFA squad that won the reserve's professional title. During the summer of 2008, he signed his first professional contract, keeping him with Monaco until 2011. He was given squad number 1 and designated as third keeper.

He unexpectedly made his professional debut on 29 November 2008 in a 1–0 victory over Auxerre coming on as a substitute in the 37th minute for the injured Flavio Roma who was starting in place of the injured first-choice keeper Stéphane Ruffier. Thuram kept a clean sheet for the rest of the match. Due to the severity of Roma's injury and Ruffier being out indefinitely as well, Yohann started the following week against Sochaux. Yohann performed well enough for Monaco to earn a 1–1 draw. Before signing his professional contract with Monaco, Barcelona showed interest in the young keeper. On 26 June 2010, Thuram signed a contract extension with Monaco until 2012. Four days later, he was loaned to second division club Tours in order to get some consistent playing time. In the summer of 2013, he signed a contract with Standard Liège.

On 13 January 2014, Thuram-Ulien joined English club Charlton Athletic on loan until the end of the season; he made four first-team appearances and kept one clean sheet. According to an article in the Evening Standard, manager Chris Powell was ordered to play Thuram-Ulien over Ben Hamer by the club's owner Roland Duchâtelet.

On 2 August 2016, Thuram signed a three-year contract for French club Le Havre. He signed for Le Mans, newly promoted to Ligue 2, in July 2019.

On 17 July 2020, Amiens announced the signing of Thuram-Ulien on a two-year deal.

On 2 August 2022, Thuram signed with Quevilly-Rouen for one year.

== International career ==
Thuram-Ulien did not receive any distinct call-ups to any of the youth national squads, but has received call-ups to France's under-21 futsal team. On 5 February 2009, he earned his first call-up to the France under-21 team. On 24 March 2009, he was called up to the Guadeloupe team for a friendly match. His call up to Guadeloupe, who were preparing for the 2009 CONCACAF Gold Cup, would not have hindered future selections from France for Thuram as they are not a member of FIFA. He made his debut for the Guadeloupean national team in a Caribbean Cup 0–0 (3–2) win on penalties against Suriname.

== Personal life ==
Thuram-Ulien was born in metropolitan France to parents of Guadeloupean descent. He is the cousin of former French international defender and 1998 World Cup winner Lilian Thuram, who also began his senior career at Monaco.

== Career statistics ==
=== Club ===
Appearances and goals by club, season and competition
Club	Season	League			Cup		League cup		Europe		Other		Total	
Club	Season	Division	Apps	Goals	Apps	Goals	Apps	Goals	Apps	Goals	Apps	Goals	Apps	Goals
Monaco	2008–09	Ligue 1	3	0	0	0	0	0	—		—		3	0
Monaco	2009–10	Ligue 1	1	0	0	0	0	0	—		—		1	0
Monaco	Total		4	0	0	0	0	0	—		—		4	0
Tours (loan)	2010–11	Ligue 2	20	0	0	0	0	0	—		—		20	0
Troyes	2011–12	Ligue 2	21	0	4	0	—		—		—		25	0
Troyes	2012–13	Ligue 2	38	0	1	0	3	0	—		—		42	0
Troyes	Total		59	0	5	0	3	0	—		—		67	0
Standard Liège	2013–14	Belgian Pro League	3	0	1	0	—		3	0	—		7	0
Standard Liège	2014–15	Belgian Pro League	29	0	1	0	—		3	0	—		33	0
Standard Liège	2015–16	Belgian Pro League	12	0	0	0	—		4	0	—		16	0
Standard Liège	Total		44	0	2	0	—		10	0	—		56	0
Charlton Athletic (loan)	2013–14	Championship	4	0	0	0	—		—		—		4	0
Le Havre	2016–17	Ligue 2	9	0	3	0	0	0	—		—		12	0
Le Havre	2017–18	Ligue 2	26	0	1	0	2	0	—		2	0	31	0
Le Havre	2018–19	Ligue 2	30	0	2	0	0	0	—		—		32	0
Le Havre	Total		65	0	6	0	2	0	—		2	0	75	0
Le Mans	2019–20	Ligue 2	8	0	0	0	1	0	—		—		9	0
Amiens	2020–21	Ligue 2	5	0	2	0	—		—		—		7	0
Amiens	2021–22	Ligue 2	1	0	6	0	—		—		—		7	0
Amiens	Total		6	0	8	0	—		—		—		14	0
Quevilly-Rouen	2022–23	Ligue 2	7	0	1	0	—		—		—		8	0
Quevilly-Rouen II	2022–23	National 3	1	0	—		—		—		—		1	0
Career total			218	0	22	0	6	0	10	0	2	0	258	0

=== International ===
Appearances and goals by national team and year
National team	Year	Apps	Goals
Guadeloupe	2016	4	0
Guadeloupe	2021	5	0
Guadeloupe	2022	1	0
Total		10	0
