= Mustapha Sangaré =

Malian footballer (born 1998)

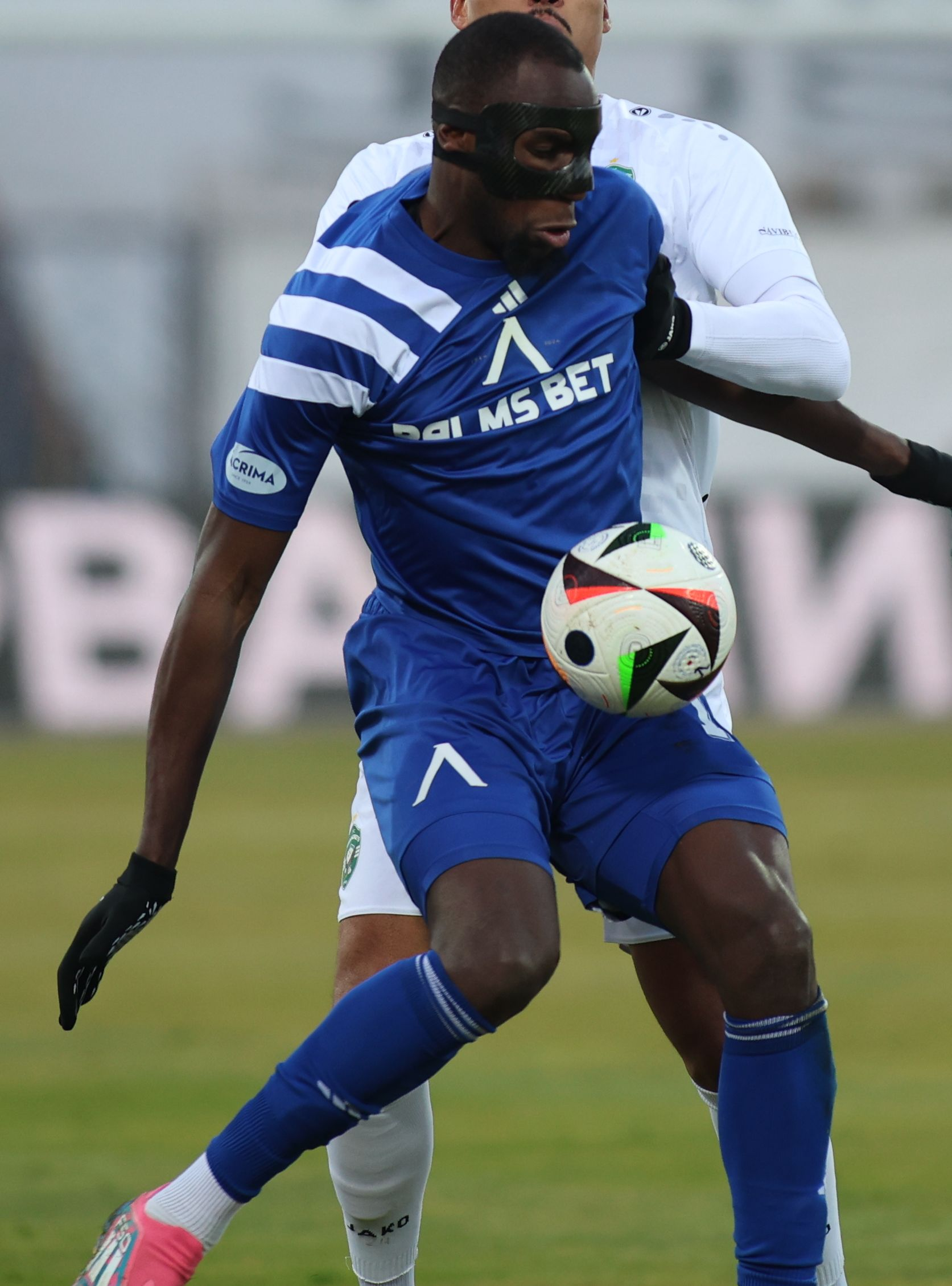

Personal information
- Date of birth: 24 December 1998 (age 27)
- Place of birth: Paris, France
- Height: 1.96 m (6 ft 5 in)
- Position: Forward

Team information
- Current team: Levski Sofia
- Number: 12

Senior career*
Years	Team	Apps	(Gls)
2014–2018	La Camillienne		
2018–2019	CO Vincennes		
2019–2020	Racing Club	13	(9)
2020–2023	Amiens	8	(1)
2022–2023	Amiens B	4	(1)
2022–2023	→ Borgo (loan)	21	(5)
2023–2024	Varzim	28	(5)
2024–	Levski Sofia	63	(17)

International career^{‡}
2025–	Mali	5	(0)
- * Club domestic league appearances and goals as of 17:10, 8 November 2026 (UTC) ‡ National team caps and goals as of 19:44, 8 October 2025 (UTC)

Mustapha Sangaré (born 24 December 1998) is a professional footballer who plays as a forward for Bulgarian First League club Levski Sofia. Born in France, he represents the Mali national team.

== Club career ==
An amateur footballer for most of his early career, Sangaré signed a professional contract with Amiens SC on 6 November 2020. He first joined local club La Camillienne at age fifteen, where he started to coach kids at the age of seventeen. In doing so, he climbed 10 divisions from the start of the career into the Ligue 2. Sangaré made his professional debut with Amiens in a 0–0 Ligue 2 tie with Ajaccio on 22 December 2020.

On 30 September 2022, Sangaré was loaned to Borgo.

On 27 July 2023, Sangaré left Amiens and signed a two-year contract with Portuguese Liga 3 club Varzim.

== International career ==
Sangaré was born in France to a Malian father and Senegalese mother. He was called up to the Mali national team for a set of 2026 FIFA World Cup qualification matches in March 2025. On 24 March 2025, Sangaré earned his first cap, coming on as a late second-half substitute in a 0–0 away draw with the Central African Republic in a 2026 World Cup qualifier.

== Career statistics ==
=== Club ===
As of match played 2 July 2025

Appearances and goals by club, season and competition
Club	Season	League			National cup (Note: Includes Coupe de France, Bulgarian Cup)		Europe		Total	
Club	Season	Division	Apps	Goals	Apps	Goals	Apps	Goals	Apps	Goals
Racing Club	2019–20	National 3	7	1	—		—		7	1
Racing Club	2020–21	National 3	6	8	—		—		6	8
Racing Club	Total		13	9	—		—		13	9
Amiens	2020–21	Ligue 2	3	0	1	0	—		4	0
Amiens	2021–22	Ligue 2	5	1	1	0	—		6	1
Amiens	Total		8	1	2	0	—		10	1
Amiens B	2021–22	National 3	3	1	—		—		3	1
Amiens B	2022–23	National 3	1	0	—		—		1	0
Amiens B	Total		4	1	—		—		4	1
Borgo (loan)	2022–23	CFA	21	5	—		—		21	5
Varzim	2023–24	Liga 3	28	5	0	0	—		28	5
Levski Sofia	2024–25	First League	34	8	3	1	—		37	9
Levski Sofia	2025–26	First League	23	9	2	0	6 (Note: Four appearances and one goal in UEFA Europa League, two appearances in UEFA Conference League)	1	31	10
Levski Sofia	Total		57	17	4	1	6	1	67	19
Career total			131	38	7	1	6	1	144	40

=== International ===
As of match played 8 October 2025

Appearances and goals by national team and year
National team	Year	Apps	Goals
Mali	2025	5	0
Total		5	0

== Honours ==
Levski Sofia

- Bulgarian First League: 2025–26
