= Stade Brestois 29 =

Association football club in Brittany, France

Brest
- Full name: Stade Brestois 29
- Nicknames: Les Pirates (The Pirates); Les Ty' Zefs (The Little Winds)
- Founded: 1903; 123 years ago (as Armoricaine de Brest); 26 June 1950; 76 years ago (as Stade brestois); 1982; 44 years ago (as Brest Armorique FC)
- Stadium: Stade Francis-Le Blé
- Capacity: 15,220
- Owner(s): Denis Le Saint; Gérard Le Saint
- President: Denis Le Saint
- Head coach: Julien Lachuer
- League: Ligue 1
- 2025–26: Ligue 1, 12th of 18
- Website: www.sb29.bzh
Home colours	Away colours	Third colours

Stade Brestois 29 (French: Stade brestois 29), commonly known as Stade Brestois or simply Brest, (Note: Stade Brest, used by some English-speaking media outlets and journalists, is not a grammatically correct name for the club.) is a Breton professional football club based in Brest. It was founded in 1950 following the merger of five local patronages, including Armoricaine de Brest, founded in 1903. The club has competed in Ligue 1, the top division of French football, ever since being promoted to the top flight during the 2018–19 season.

In its early years, Brest rapidly rose in the hierarchy of regional football to the point of being promoted to the Championnat de France Amateur in 1958. The club joined Division 2 in 1970, then finally reached Division 1 in 1979. It experienced its sporting peak between 1981 and 1991 under the presidency of François Yvinec, playing nine seasons in the highest tier in ten years. In 1991, the club was demoted before filing for bankruptcy a few months later. The club only returned to the second division in 2004 and Ligue 1 in 2010. At the end of the 2012–13 season, it had thirteen and seventeen seasons respectively in the first two divisions. In 2023–24, underdogs Brest achieved an unlikely third-place finish in Ligue 1 and thus qualified for the 2024–25 UEFA Champions League, marking the first appearance in any European competition in the club's history.

Stade Brestois has been chaired since 10 May 2016 by entrepreneur Denis Le Saint.

== History ==
Sources do not agree as to the date of the club's creation. According to the version presented by the current club, it was born in 1950 from the merger of five local patronages. However, when it was created, Stade Brestois took over the structures and the place of Armoricaine de Brest, founded in 1903, of which it would therefore be the direct heir.

=== Armoricaine de Brest (1903–1950) ===
The sports section of Saint Louis patronage was created in 1903 by taking the name of Armoricaine de Brest and adopting a motto: "Pen Huel" ("Heads up" in Breton). Before the First World War, 500 young people and 400 children attended the various patronage activities: military preparation, shooting, football, athletics, men's gymnastics, theatre, choir, brass band, and study circles. The war thinned the ranks of the Armoricans, but activities quickly resumed.

In 1922, Father Cozanet had a stadium built at Petit Paris, on the current Stade Francis-Le Blé site, a grandstand still bearing the Armorican motto (the Pen Huel stand) as its name. The stadium was inaugurated on 9 February 1923 during a meeting between the Armoricaine and the Stade Français. French internationals Alexis Thépot, Robert Coat and Jean Guéguen emerged from the Armorican ranks between the wars.

The patronage of the Armorican contested the 16th finals of the Coupe de France in 1921 and 1927, the 32nd finals in 1923, 1926, 1928, 1930, 1931 and 1935. In 1926, the Armoricaine took away the title of champion of France patronage by winning in the final against Saint-Jean-de-Luz (3–0). The goalkeeper Alexis Thépot, who obtained a selection while part of the Armoricaine squad in 1927 against England, was one of the club's brightest players.

=== The rise of Stade Brestois (1950–1982) ===
In 1950, the merger initiated by Canon Balbous between five Catholic patronages (the Armoricaine de Saint-Louis, the Avenir de Saint-Martin, the Flamme du Pilier Rouge, the Milice de Saint-Michel and the Jeune de Saint-Marc) gave birth to Stade Brest. One of the objectives of this merger of Catholic teams was to supplant the great Brest club of the time, AS Brest, which was secular.

At its birth, the Stade Brestois had Jean Offret as President (then as Honorary President until his death in 1998).

Taking over the place of Armoricaine in the first division of Brittany, the Stadium was promoted to Promotion d'honneur in 1951, in the regional honour division (just created) in 1952, before joining the Honour Division (1953). Stade Brestois finally reached the French Amateur Championship (CFA) in 1958, taking advantage of the withdrawal of the Voltigeurs de Châteaubriant. The club was finally evolving at the same level as its rival, AS Brest. In 1963, the club went back down to the honor division but returned to the CFA in 1966. Continuing its rise in the hierarchy of French football, the Stade Brestois then acceded to the second division following its enlargement in 1970.

In 1979, the Stade Brestois was promoted to the Division 1 for the first time in its history. This apprenticeship year ended with last place in the standings, but Stade went back up the following season. The club, whose new president was François Yvinec, was quite comfortably in Division 1 this time. Despite a certain instability in the coaching post, the Breton club confirmed its place in the elite during the following seasons.

=== The peak with Brest Armorique, then the brutal fall (1982–1991) ===
In 1983, President François Yvinec decided to change the name of the club to that of FC Brest Armorique to better specify the geographical location of the club. The year 1986 was a turning point in the life of the club. From that season, the Bretons embarked on the "football business" path by recruiting South American stars, who, after a fanfare debut, allowed them to reach a historic (unmatched until 2024) 8th place in Division 1 in 1987. However, behind the scenes, the rupture between the president and coach Raymond Keruzoré led to the latter's resignation, and the withdrawal of the main sponsor, the Leclerc stores.

Paul Le Guen, Vincent Guérin, and Patrick Colleter were not enough to keep the club going, so it went down to Division 2 in 1988 with its young generation. It was against the Racing Club de Strasbourg that they regained their place in the elite a year after the play-offs.

Back in the first division, the Brest team was made up of talented young players such as Corentin Martins, David Ginola, the Paraguayan Roberto Cabañas and the future world champion Stéphane Guivarc'h, who allowed the club to rank well in the elite. But in 1991, despite the 11th place obtained by Brest in the league, the club's significant deficit led to its administrative relegation to the Second Division.

The club on the banks of the Penfeld ended up imploding in December of that same year. During his last match with the rival Guingamp, the invasion of the lawn by the exasperated Brest supporters forced David Ginola to call for calm so the match could resume. The results of the matches the club played since the competition started were void. The club, whose liabilities were estimated at 150 million francs, filed for bankruptcy.

The professional team was dissolved, and Brest's players were released. The reserve team, then playing in the third division became the pennant team.

=== Years in amateur championships (1991–2004) ===
In 1993, the club was promoted to the brand new National 1 championship. Following the merger of the two National groups in 1997, the Stade Brestois was relegated to the French Amateur Championship, where it remained for three seasons.

After ten years in the amateur championships, the Breton club, which regained its original name (in 1993), went back to the National Championship in 2000, where it remained for four seasons.

=== Revival and return to professional divisions (2004–2019) ===
In 2004, led by a young Franck Ribéry, the club secured promotion to Ligue 2, the second division of French football. The club managed to stay at this level in the following years. However, Brest was not a serious candidate for promotion until the decade's end. The 2009–10 season saw the Breton club, coached by Alex Dupont, finish in second place, which secured automatic promotion to Ligue 1, following a 2–0 victory against Tours on 30 April 2010. In addition, the team had a good run in the Coupe de France, eventually falling in the round of 16 to Lens in extra time.

The club managed to ensure its position in the top division, obtained on 29 May 2011 despite a defeat at home against Toulouse. During the 2011–12 season, Brest secured its place in the first division with a win over Évian on the season's final day. It was also the club's first away win during the campaign.

=== New heights (2019–present) ===
After the 2018–19 Ligue 2 season, Brest won promotion back to Ligue 1, returning to the top flight for the first time in six years. In the 2019–20 Ligue 1 season, they finished in 14th place. In the 2020–21 Ligue 1, the team secured its safety on the final match day of the season, finishing in 17th place. From 31 October to 4 December 2021, Brest won six Ligue 1 games in a row, defeating Monaco, Lorient, Lens, Bordeaux, Saint-Étienne, and Marseille in the club's longest-ever winning streak in the top flight. They finished the 2021–22 Ligue 1 season in 11th place, the club's best finish since the 1990–91 Division 1 season.

On 3 March 2024, Brest defeated Le Havre at home by a score of 1–0 to extend their unbeaten run to thirteen matches, breaking the club's record established in 1991. Six days later, their streak was snapped in the following match, after a 1–0 defeat away to Lens. On 28 April, following a 5–4 win away to Breton rivals Rennes, Brest secured European football for the first time in their history. On the final matchday of the 2023–24 season, Brest finished third in the league, the club's best-ever season in the first division, after a 3–0 away win over Toulouse, securing direct qualification to the UEFA Champions League following a stoppage-time equalizer from Nice in a 2–2 away draw against Lille.

Brest could not make their stadium, Stade Francis-Le Blé, meet UEFA's requirements for a Champions League match and instead were forced to play their home games at Guingamp's Stade de Roudourou. In their European debut against Austrian side Sturm Graz at the Stade de Roudourou on 19 September 2024, Brest won 2–1 thanks to a second-half goal from Abdallah Sima. On 1 October, they secured a historic 4–0 victory over Red Bull Salzburg in their first-ever official match outside France. On 23 October, Brest held German champions Bayer Leverkusen to a 1–1 draw at home thanks to a Pierre Lees-Melou strike. They continued their undefeated start with a 2–1 win away to Sparta Prague on 6 November, but eventually fell 3–0 away to Barcelona on 27 November. Brest went on to beat PSV Eindhoven (1–0) before losing to Shakhtar Donetsk (2–0) and Real Madrid (3–0), finishing in 18th place in the league phase. In the knockout phase play-off, they were defeated 3–0 at home and 7–0 away by Paris Saint-Germain, the second-largest aggregate defeat in Champions League history.

== Players ==
=== Squad ===
As of 6 September 2026

Note: Flags indicate national team as defined under FIFA eligibility rules; some limited exceptions apply. Players may hold more than one non-FIFA nationality.

No.	Pos.	Nation	Player
1	GK	NOR	Egil Selvik (on loan from Watford)
2	DF	FRA	Bradley Locko
4	DF	FRA	Gautier Lloris
5	DF	FRA	Brendan Chardonnet (captain)
6	MF	MLI	Mamady Diambou
7	MF	BEL	Joseph Nonge
8	MF	FRA	Hugo Magnetti (vice-captain)
10	FW	FRA	Giovani Versini
11	FW	FRA	Noah Edjouma (on loan from Lille)
12	DF	CIV	Luck Zogbé
13	MF	FRA	Joris Chotard
16	GK	FRA	Noé Poillion

No.	Pos.	Nation	Player
17	FW	GBS	Mama Baldé
18	DF	FRA	Justin Bourgault
19	FW	FRA	Ludovic Ajorque
23	MF	MLI	Kamory Doumbia
29	MF	FRA	Lucas Tousart
30	GK	FRA	Mathieu Patouillet
32	FW	FRA	Mathis Lainé
39	FW	FRA	Djylian N'Guessan (on loan from Saint-Étienne)
49	GK	FRA	Romain Cagnon
71	DF	FRA	Raphaël Le Guen
77	DF	MTQ	Kenny Lala
99	FW	SEN	Pathé Mboup

=== Out on loan ===
Note: Flags indicate national team as defined under FIFA eligibility rules; some limited exceptions apply. Players may hold more than one non-FIFA nationality.

No.	Pos.	Nation	Player
—	MF	MLI	Hamidou Makalou (at Bastia until 30 June 2027)

=== Notable players ===
Below are the notable former and current players who have represented Stade Brestois in league and international competition since the club's foundation in 1903. To appear in the section below, a player must have either played in at least 80 official matches for the club or represented their country's national team while either playing for Brest or after departing the club. For a complete list of Stade Brestois players, see Category:Stade Brestois 29 players.

- (Argentina) Jorge Higuaín
- (France) Vincent Guérin
- (France) Stéphane Guivarc'h
- (France) Bernard Lama
- (France) Paul Le Guen
- (France) Yvon Le Roux
- (France) Corentin Martins
- (France) Bernard Pardo
- (France) Pascal Pierre
- (France) Franck Ribéry
- (France) Nolan Roux
- (Paraguay) Roberto Cabañas
- (Socialist Federal Republic of Yugoslavia) Drago Vabec
- (Spain) Robin Le Normand

== Club officials ==
Position	Name
Manager	(France) Julien Lachuer
Assistant Manager	Vacant
First-Team Coach	(Martinique) Bruno Grougi
Goalkeeping Coach	(France) Christophe Revel
Conditioning Coach	(France) Yvan Bourgis
Sporting Director	(France) Grégory Lorenzi
Team Coordinator	(France) Matthieu Jézéquel
Doctor	(France) Michel Kergastel
Physiotherapist	(France) Gilles Baudouin (France) Erwan Orlach (France) Hugo Keriven
Scout	(France) Thierry Bonalair
Head of Marketing	(France) Pascal Robert
Marketing Staff	(France) Jean-Luc Le Magueresse
Board Member	(France) Daniel Le Roux (France) Yvon Kermarec

== Coaches ==
- Francis Chopin (1950–62)
- Albert Toris (1962–63)
- Sarkis Garabedian (1963–76)
- Armand Fouillen (1) (1963–76)
- Ernest Rannou (1964–66)
- Alain de Martigny (1) (1976–82)
- Dušan Nenković (1982–84)
- Robert Dewilder (1984–86)
- Raymond Kéruzoré (1986–87)
- Bernard Maligorne (1987–89)
- Slavoljub Muslin (1989–91)
- Armand Fouillen (2) (1991–93)
- Yvon Le Roux (1991–93)
- Yves Todorov (1993–94)
- Pierre Garcia (1994–95)
- Denis Goavec (1995–97)
- Pascal Robert (1997–99)
- Alain de Martigny (2) (1999–02)
- Sylvain Matrisciano (2002–03)
- Albert Rust (July 2003 – Mar 2006)
- Thierry Goudet (March 2006 – Dec 2006)
- Pascal Janin (Jan 2007 – Oct 2008)
- Gérald Baticle (Nov 2008 – May 2009)
- Alex Dupont (1) (May 2009 – Apr 2012)
- Landry Chauvin (May 2012 – Apr 2013)
- Corentin Martins (interim) (April 2013 – May 2013)
- Alex Dupont (2) (June 2013 – May 2016)
- Jean-Marc Furlan (May 2016 – May 2019)
- Olivier Dall'Oglio (2019 – May 2021)
- Michel Der Zakarian (May 2021 – October 2022)
- Bruno Grougi (interim) (October 2022 – January 2023)
- Éric Roy (January 2023 – June 2026)
- Julien Lachuer (June 2026 – present)

== Honours ==
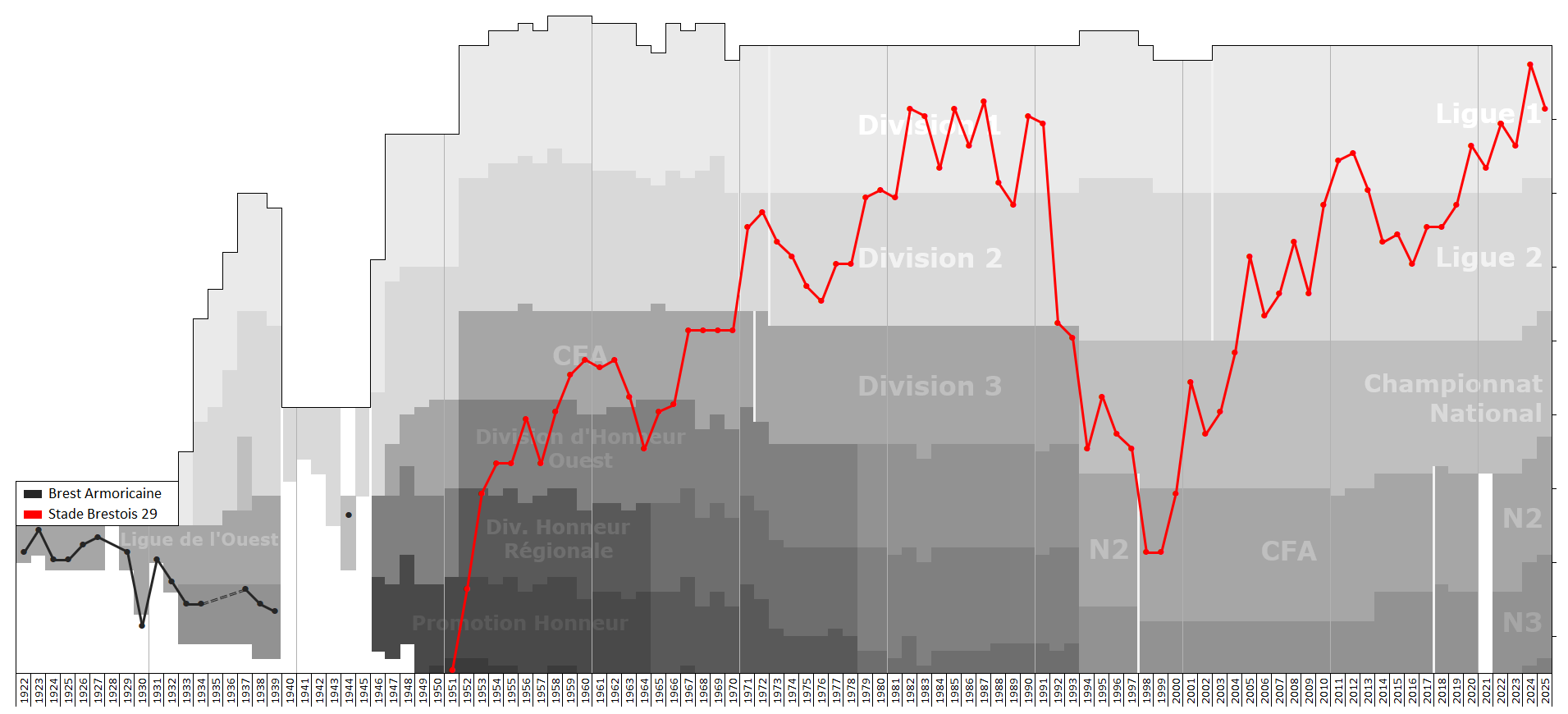
Historical league performance chart of Stade Brestois 29

- Ligue 2
  - Champions: 1980–81
- Coupe de France
  - Quarter-finalist: (2) 1982–83, 2014–15
- Coupe Gambardella
  - Winner: 1990
- Division d'Honneur (Bretagne)
  - Champions: (4) 1966, 1972, 1977, 2005
- Cup of Brittany
  - Winner: 1969
- Championnat de France des patronages (catholic football league)
  - Winner: 1923

== Post-merger history ==
Season	Level	Div.	Pos.	Pld	W	D	L	GF	GA	Points	Eur.Cup Entrance	French Cup	French League Cup	Av.Attendance
as Stade Brestois 29
1997–98	4	CFA-D	9.	34	12	10	12	45	40	46	---	qual.stage	–	530
1998–99	4	CFA-D	9.	34	12	12	10	44	38	48	---	qual.stage	–	–
1999–2000	4	CFA-D	1.	34	20	9	5	50	31	69	---	R. 1/32	–	–
2000–01	3	Championnat National	6.	38	19	6	13	64	48	63	---	qual.stage	–	–
2001–02	3	Championnat National	13.	38	11	11	16	40	43	44	---	qual.stage	–	–
2002–03	3	Championnat National	10.	38	13	11	14	49	44	50	---	qual.stage	–	–
2003–04	3	Championnat National	2.	38	20	8	10	45	30	68	---	R.1/8	–	–
2004–05	2	Ligue 2	9.	38	13	16	9	38	34	55	---	R.1/32	R.1/16	7,340
2005–06	2	Ligue 2	17.	38	9	15	14	34	48	42	---	R.1/8	qual.stage	6,167
2006–07	2	Ligue 2	14.	38	10	15	13	40	40	45	---	R.1/32	qual.stage	5,932
2007–08	2	Ligue 2	7.	38	15	12	11	38	38	57	---	R.1/16	R.1/32	5,739
2008–09	2	Ligue 2	14.	38	13	6	19	45	50	45	---	R.1/16	qual.stage	6,334
2009–10	2	Ligue 2	2.	38	20	7	11	53	34	67	---	R.1/8	first round	7,702
2010–11	1	Ligue 1	16.	38	11	13	14	36	43	46	---	R.1/32	third round	13,549
2011–12	1	Ligue 1	15.	38	8	17	13	31	38	41	---	R.1/64	third round	13,597
2012–13	1	Ligue 1	20.	38	8	5	25	32	62	29	---	R.1/16	third round	11,796
2013–14	2	Ligue 2	7.	38	15	11	12	38	32	56	---	R.1/32	third round	7,609
2014–15	2	Ligue 2	6.	38	14	15	9	41	27	57	---	R.1/4	first round	7,557
2015–16	2	Ligue 2	10.	38	12	11	15	34	41	47	---	qual. stage	first round	6,887
2016–17	2	Ligue 2	5.	38	19	8	11	58	44	65	---	R.1/64	second round	8,042
2017–18	2	Ligue 2	5.	38	18	11	9	58	43	65	---	qual. stage	first round	7,458
2018–19	2	Ligue 2	2.	38	21	11	6	64	35	74	---	R.1/64	second round	9,216
2019–20	1	Ligue 1	14.	28	8	10	10	34	37	34	---	R.1/64	R.1/4	13,699 (14 matches played)
2020–21	1	Ligue 1	17.	38	11	8	19	50	66	41	---	R.1/16	x	4,496 (With 4 games played outside camera)
2021–22	1	Ligue 1	11.	38	13	9	16	49	58	48	---	R.1/8	x	11,710
2022–23	1	Ligue 1	14.	38	11	11	16	44	54	44	---	R.1/32	x	12,657
2023–24	1	Ligue 1	3.	34	17	10	7	53	34	61	---	R.1/16	x	14,574
2024–25	1	Ligue 1	9.	34	15	5	14	52	59	50	UCL League Phase	TBD	x	TBD

As of 29 August, 2024

== European record ==
Season	Competition	Round	Country	Opponent	Home	Away	Aggregate
2024–25	UEFA Champions League	League phase	(Austria)	Sturm Graz	2–1	—N/a	18th
2024–25	UEFA Champions League	League phase	(Austria)	Red Bull Salzburg	—N/a	4–0	18th
2024–25	UEFA Champions League	League phase	(Germany)	Bayer Leverkusen	1–1	—N/a	18th
2024–25	UEFA Champions League	League phase	(Czech Republic)	Sparta Prague	—N/a	2–1	18th
2024–25	UEFA Champions League	League phase	(Spain)	Barcelona	—N/a	0–3	18th
2024–25	UEFA Champions League	League phase	(Netherlands)	PSV Eindhoven	1–0	—N/a	18th
2024–25	UEFA Champions League	League phase	(Ukraine)	Shakhtar Donetsk	—N/a	0–2	18th
2024–25	UEFA Champions League	League phase	(Spain)	Real Madrid	0–3	—N/a	18th
2024–25	UEFA Champions League	Knockout phase play-offs	(France)	Paris Saint-Germain	0–3	0–7	0–10

== Partnership ==
Since September 2011, Stade Brestois 29 sponsors its amateur American counterpart in New York City, Stade Brestois New York.
