= Julien Lachuer =

French footballer (born 1976)

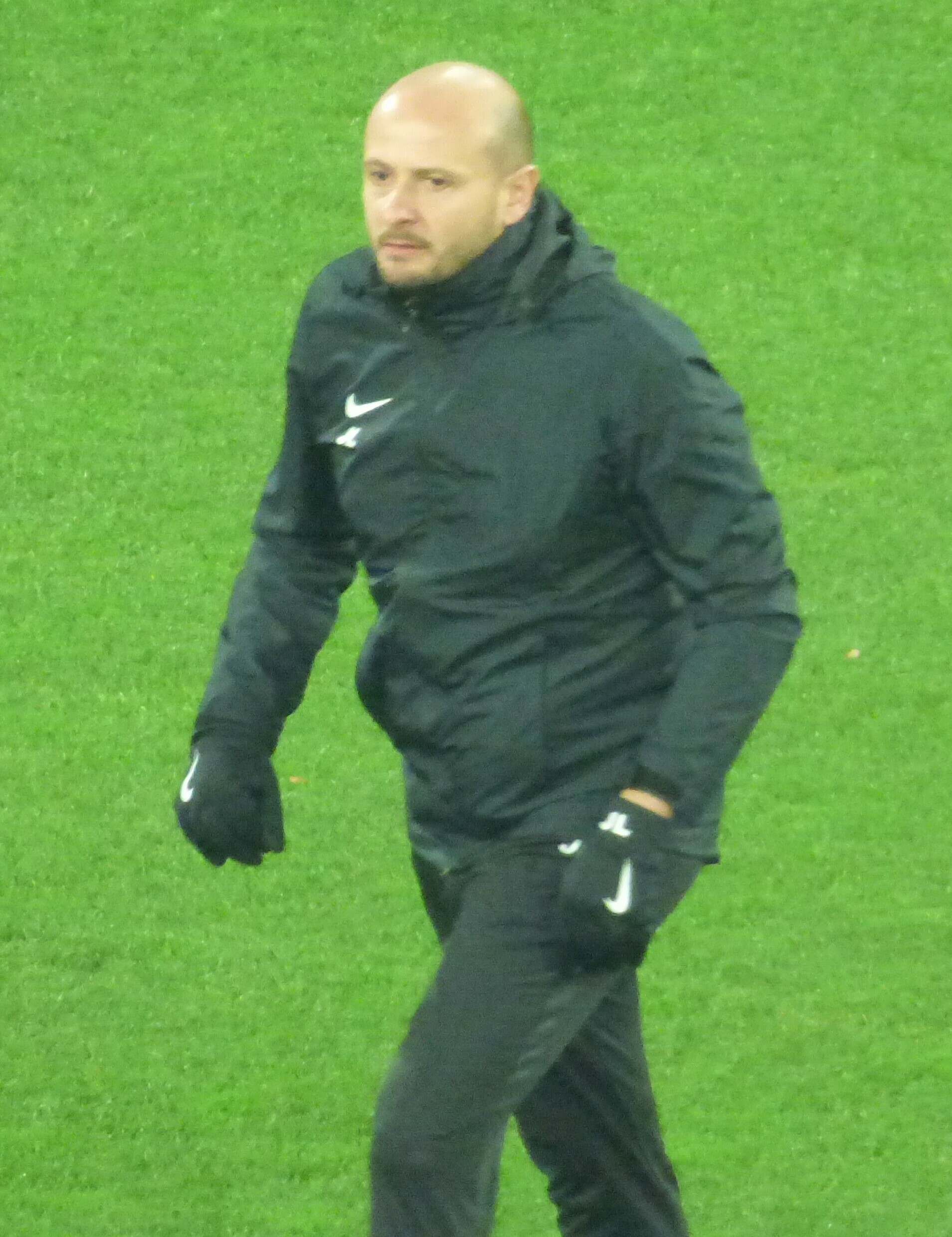
- Lachuer in 2018

Personal information
- Date of birth: 15 November 1976 (age 49)
- Place of birth: Saint-Maur, France
- Height: 1.79 m (5 ft 10 in)
- Position: Goalkeeper

Team information
- Current team: Brest (head coach)

Senior career*
Years	Team	Apps	(Gls)
1993–1995	Valenciennes	0	(0)
1995–2003	Amiens	115	(0)
2003–2005	Angers	70	(0)
2005–2010	Brest	28	(0)
Total		213	(0)

Managerial career
- 2026–: Brest
- * Club domestic league appearances and goals

Julien Lachuer (born 15 November 1976) is a French former professional footballer who played as a goalkeeper. He is currently the manager of Ligue 1 side Brest.

== Personal life ==
Lachuer is the brother of Yann Lachuer, and the father of Mathis Lachuer, both professional footballers.
