= Matthéo Xantippe =

French footballer (born 2002)

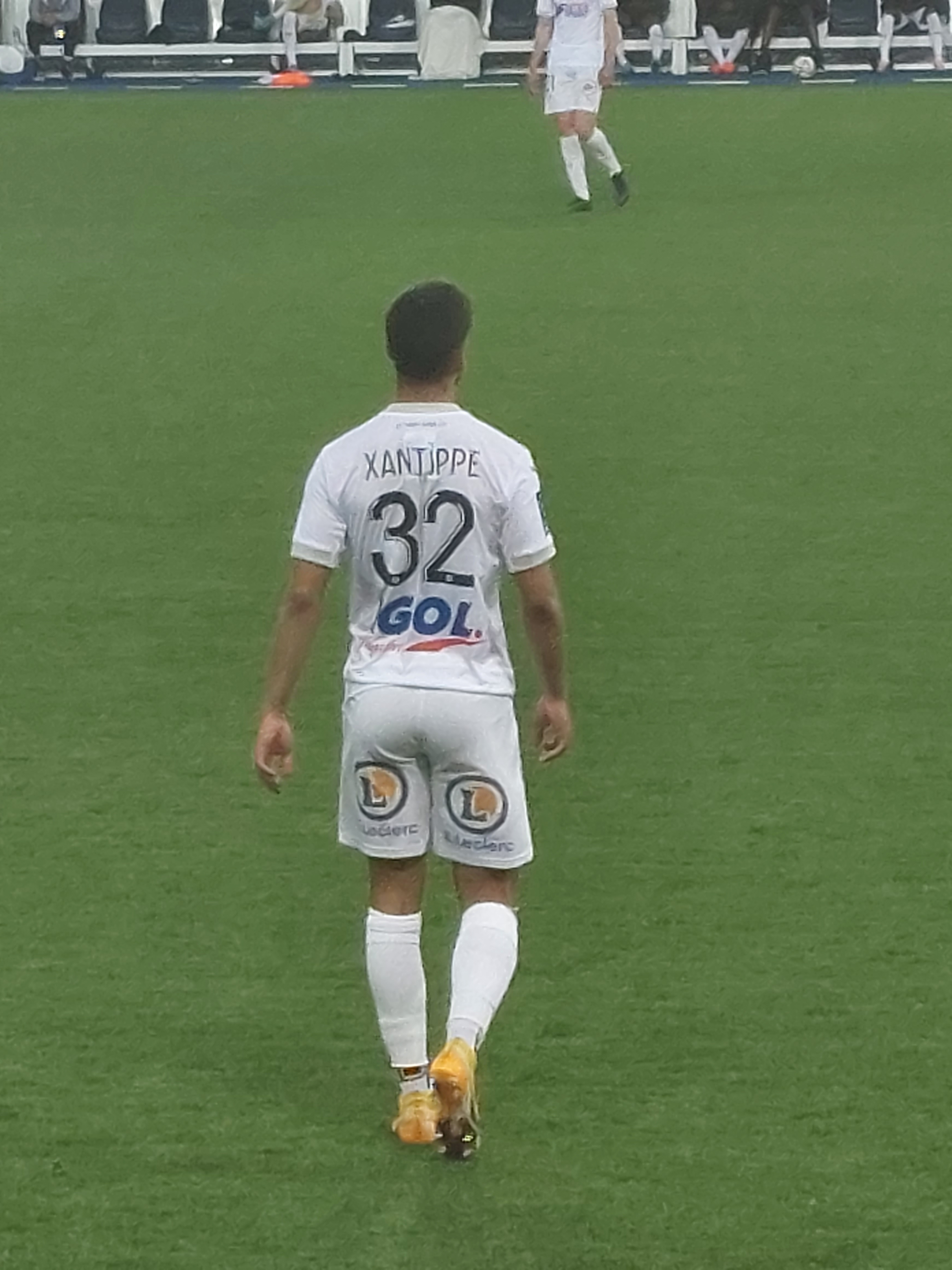
- Xantippe in 2022 with Amiens

Personal information
- Date of birth: 11 April 2002 (age 24)
- Place of birth: Amiens, France
- Height: 1.83 m (6 ft 0 in)
- Position: Defender

Team information
- Current team: Grenoble
- Number: 27

Youth career
- 2008–2009: Amiens
- 2009–2014: US Camon
- 2014–2020: Amiens

Senior career*
Years	Team	Apps	(Gls)
2020–2023	Amiens II	12	(0)
2021–2023	Amiens	45	(0)
2023–	Grenoble	62	(4)

International career^{‡}
2020	France U18	1	(0)
- * Club domestic league appearances and goals as of 12 May 2026 ‡ National team caps and goals as of 22:17, 30 July 2021 (UTC)

Matthéo Xantippe (born 11 April 2002) is a French professional footballer who plays as a defender for Ligue 2 club Grenoble.

== Club career ==
Matthéo Xantippe made his professional debut for Amiens on the 24 July 2021.

On 26 June 2023, Xantippe signed a three-year contract with Grenoble.

== Personal life ==
Xantippe's grandfather, Edouard Xantippe, was a Guadeloupean footballer who also played for Amiens in the 1970s. Edouard's brother, Claude, also played for Amiens.
