= Jayson Papeau =

French footballer (born 14 June 1996)

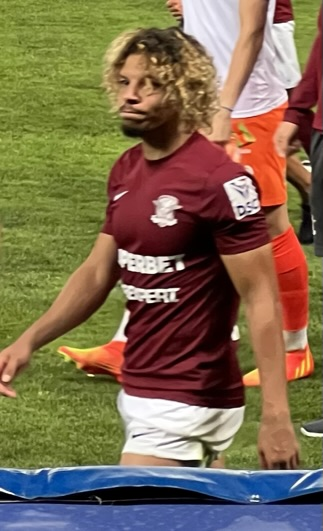
- Papeau with Rapid București in 2022

Personal information
- Full name: Jayson Jordan Julien Romain Papeau
- Date of birth: 14 June 1996 (age 30)
- Place of birth: Melun, France
- Height: 1.79 m (5 ft 10 in)
- Position: Midfielder

Team information
- Current team: UTA Arad
- Number: 77

Youth career
- 2002–2013: Le Mée SF
- 2011–2012: → US Chauny (loan)
- 2013–2015: Melun

Senior career*
Years	Team	Apps	(Gls)
2015–2018	Le Mée SF		
2018–2019	Sainte-Geneviève	27	(7)
2019	Amiens B	7	(2)
2020–2021	Amiens	31	(2)
2020	→ Chambly (loan)	1	(0)
2021–2022	Warta Poznań	27	(0)
2022–2024	Rapid București	62	(6)
2024–2025	Al-Markhiya	13	(7)
2025–2026	Unirea Slobozia	15	(3)
2026–	UTA Arad	15	(1)
- * Club domestic league appearances and goals as of 6 November 2026

Jayson Jordan Julien Romain Papeau (born 14 June 1996) is a French professional footballer who plays as a midfielder for Liga I club UTA Arad.

== Career ==
On 2 January 2020, Papeau signed on loan with FC Chambly from Amiens. On 10 January 2020, he made his professional debut with Chambly in a 1–0 Ligue 2 win over Orléans. On 31 August 2021, Papeau switched to the Polish Ekstraklasa club Warta Poznań on a permanent transfer.

On 22 July 2022, Rapid București announced Papeau would join the Romanian club on a two-year contract, with a one-year extension option.

On 10 September 2024, Papeau joined Qatari Second Division club Al-Markhiya.

== Career statistics ==
As of match played 6 November 2026

Appearances and goals by club, season and competition
Club	Season	League			National cup (Note: Includes Coupe de France, Cupa României)		Europe		Other		Total	
Club	Season	Division	Apps	Goals	Apps	Goals	Apps	Goals	Apps	Goals	Apps	Goals
Le Mée SF	2015–16	Régional 1	?	?	?	?	—		—		?	?
Le Mée SF	2016–17	Régional 1	?	?	?	?	—		—		?	?
Le Mée SF	2017–18	Régional 1	?	?	?	?	—		—		?	?
Le Mée SF	Total		?	?	?	?	—		—		?	?
Sainte-Geneviève	2018–19	Championnat National 2	27	7	1	0	—		—		28	7
Amiens B	2019–20	Championnat National 3	7	2	—		—		—		7	2
Chambly (loan)	2019–20	Ligue 2	1	0	1	0	—		—		2	0
Amiens	2020–21	Ligue 2	26	1	1	0	—		—		27	1
Amiens	2021–22	Ligue 2	5	1	—		—		—		5	1
Amiens	Total		31	2	1	0	—		—		32	2
Warta Poznań	2021–22	Ekstraklasa	26	0	0	0	—		—		26	0
Warta Poznań	2022–23	Ekstraklasa	1	0	—		—		—		1	0
Warta Poznań	Total		27	0	0	0	—		—		27	0
Rapid București	2022–23	Liga I	20	0	1	1	—		—		21	1
Rapid București	2023–24	Liga I	34	5	3	0	—		—		37	5
Rapid București	2024–25	Liga I	8	1	—		—		—		8	1
Rapid București	Total		62	6	4	1	—		—		66	7
Al-Markhiya	2024–25	Qatar Stars League 2	13	7	0	0	—		1 (Note: Appearances in Qatar Stars League 2 relegation play-offs)	0	14	7
Unirea Slobozia	2025–26	Liga I	15	3	—		—		—		15	3
UTA Arad	2026–27	Liga I	15	1	2	1	—		—		17	2
Career total			198	28	9	2	—		1	0	208	30

== Personal life ==
Papeau is of Guadeloupean descent.
