= Darell Tokpa =

French footballer (born 2001)

Personal information
- Date of birth: 2 June 2001 (age 25)
- Place of birth: Colombes, France
- Height: 1.84 m (6 ft 0 in)
- Position: Forward

Team information
- Current team: Saint-Colomban Locminé
- Number: 12

Youth career
- 2011–2016: Rueil-Malmaison
- 2016–2017: ACBB
- 2017–2019: Amiens

Senior career*
Years	Team	Apps	(Gls)
2019–2023	Amiens II	14	(6)
2020–2023	Amiens	9	(0)
2021–2022	→ Red Star (loan)	12	(1)
2022–2023	→ Stade Briochin (loan)	10	(2)
2022–2023	→ Stade Briochin II (loan)	2	(1)
2023	→ Differdange 03 (loan)	9	(0)
2023–2024	Guingamp II	13	(1)
2024–	Saint-Colomban Locminé	4	(0)

International career^{‡}
2019	France U18	10	(1)
- * Club domestic league appearances and goals as of 7 December 2024 ‡ National team caps and goals as of 14:20, 28 June 2022 (UTC)

Darell Tokpa (born 2 June 2001) is a French professional footballer who plays as a forward for Championnat National 1 club Saint-Colomban Locminé.

== Club career ==
Tokpa made his professional debut with Amiens SC in 1–1 Ligue 2 tie with Clermont on 21 November 2020.

On 12 July 2022, Tokpa moved on a season-long loan to Stade Briochin. On 1 February 2023, he moved on a new loan to Differdange 03 in Luxembourg.

== International career ==
Born in metropolitan France, Tokpa is of Ivorian, Guadeloupean and Martiniquais descent. He is a youth international for France.
