= Jonathan Bumbu =

French footballer (born 1999)

Personal information
- Date of birth: 11 February 1999 (age 27)
- Place of birth: Mantes-la-Jolie, France
- Height: 1.81 m (5 ft 11 in)
- Position: Midfielder

Senior career*
| Years | Team | Apps | (Gls) |
| 2017–2019 | Lille II | 27 | (4) |
| 2019–2021 | Amiens II | 10 | (0) |
| 2021 | → Boulogne (loan) | 5 | (0) |
| 2021–2022 | Radomlje | 18 | (0) |
| 2022–2024 | Cesena | 26 | (5) |
| 2024 | Gubbio | 17 | (1) |
| 2024–2025 | Team Altamura | 26 | (0) |
- * Club domestic league appearances and goals as of 27 April 2025

Jonathan Bumbu (born 11 February 1999) is a French professional footballer who plays as a midfielder.

== Club career ==
On 2 July 2019, Bumbu signed a professional contract with Amiens. He made his professional debut with Amiens in a Coupe de France match against Rennes on 4 January 2020.

On 1 February 2021, Bumbu joined Boulogne on loan until the end of the 2020–21 season.

In October 2021, Bumbu signed for Slovenian PrvaLiga side Radomlje.

On 23 July 2022, Bumbu moved to Cesena in Italy on a two-year contract.

== Personal life ==
Born in France, Bumbu is of DR Congolese descent.
