= Arnaud Lusamba =

Congolese footballer (born 1997)

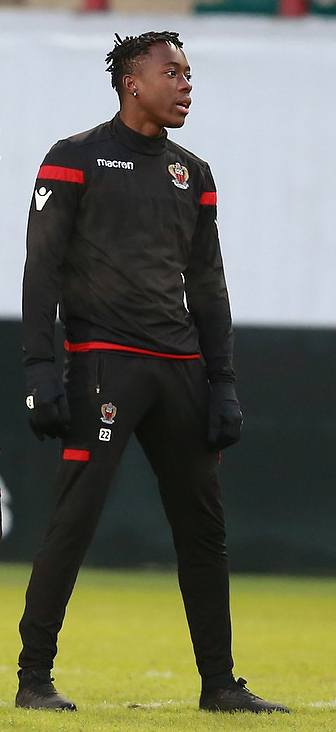
- Lusamba in 2018

Personal information
- Full name: Arnaud Rene Lusamba
- Date of birth: 4 January 1997 (age 29)
- Place of birth: Metz, France
- Height: 1.79 m (5 ft 10 in)
- Position: Central midfielder

Youth career
- 2004–2010: ESAP Metz
- 2010–2014: Nancy

Senior career*
Years	Team	Apps	(Gls)
2014–2016	Nancy B	7	(1)
2014–2016	Nancy	49	(10)
2016–2020	Nice	25	(1)
2018–2019	→ Cercle Brugge (loan)	25	(0)
2020–2022	Amiens	65	(5)
2022–2024	Alanyaspor	28	(1)
2023–2024	→ Pendikspor (loan)	27	(0)
2024–2025	Baniyas	26	(1)
2025–2026	Thep Xanh Nam Dinh	3	(0)

International career^{‡}
2012–2013	France U16	15	(0)
2013–2014	France U17	9	(2)
2014–2015	France U18	5	(0)
2015–2016	France U19	6	(2)
2022–	DR Congo	2	(0)
- * Club domestic league appearances and goals as of 22 July 2026 ‡ National team caps and goals as of 02:38, 29 September 2022 (UTC)

Arnaud Rene Lusamba (born 4 January 1997) is a professional footballer who plays as a central midfielder. Born in France, he plays for the DR Congo national football team.

== Club career ==
=== Nancy ===
Lusamba is a youth exponent from AS Nancy. He made his Ligue 2 debut on 1 August 2014 against Dijon FCO scoring his team's only goal in a 1–1 draw.

=== Nice ===
On 19 July 2016, Lusamba joined Nice.

In March 2019, he returned to Nice after seven months on loan with Cercle Brugge.

=== Alanyaspor ===
On 4 August 2022, Lusamba signed a three-year contract with Alanyaspor in Turkey.

==== Loan to Pendikspor ====
On 22 August 2023, Lusamba was sent on a season-long loan to Turkish club Pendikspor.

=== Nam Dinh ===
On 7 October 2025, Lusamba signed for Vietnamese club Thep Xanh Nam Dinh alongside his fellow countryman Chadrac Akolo.

== International career ==
Lusamba was born in France and is of Congolese and Cape Verdean descents. He was a youth international for France. He was called up to the DR Congo national team for a set of friendlies in September 2022. He made his debut in a 1–0 friendly loss to Burundi on 23 September 2022.
