= Mickaël Alphonse =

Association football player (born 1989)

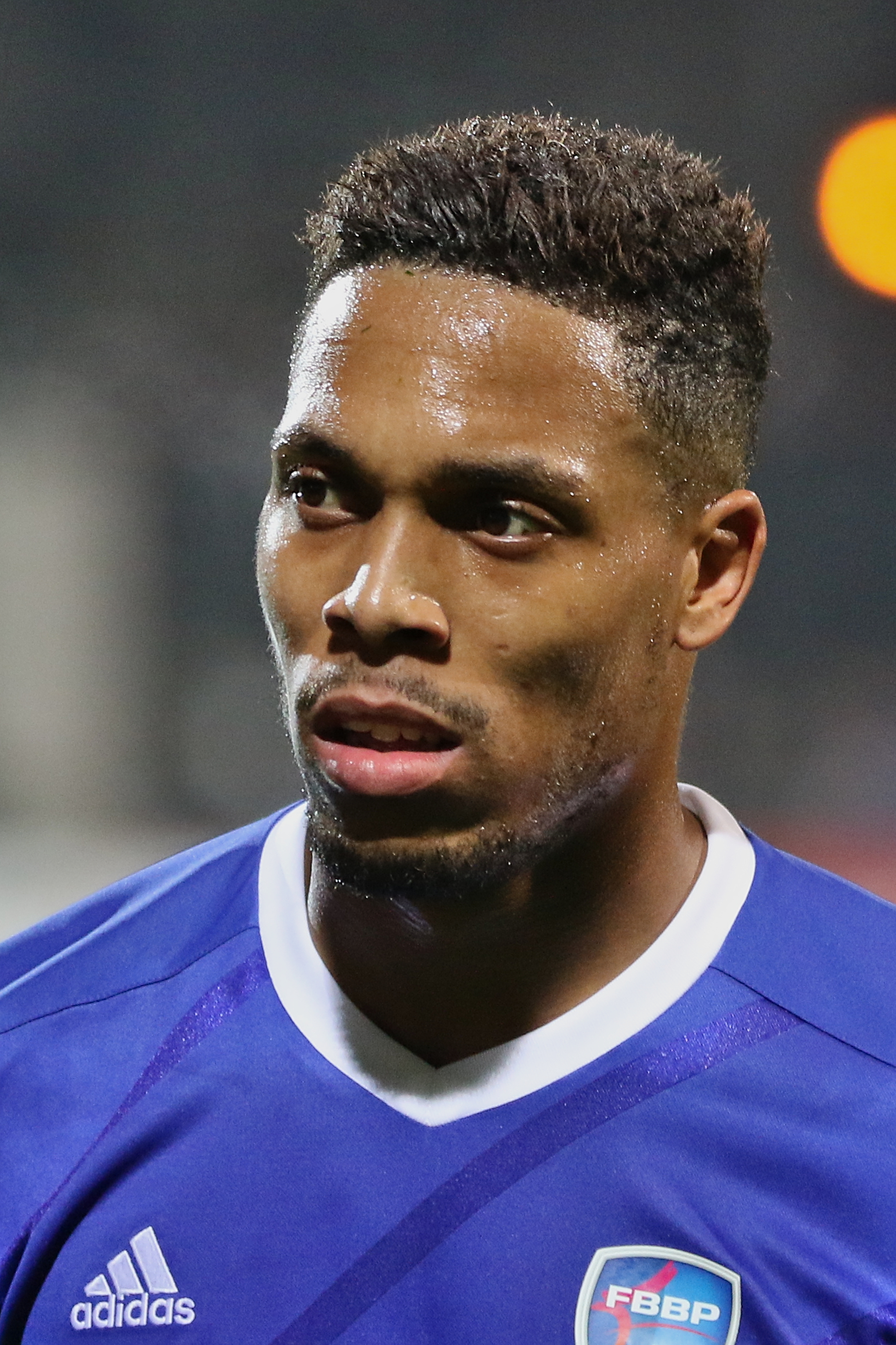
- Alphonse in 2015

Personal information
- Full name: Mickaël David Alphonse
- Date of birth: 12 July 1989 (age 37)
- Place of birth: Champigny-sur-Marne, France
- Height: 1.82 m (6 ft 0 in)
- Position: Right-back

Senior career*
Years	Team	Apps	(Gls)
2007–2010	Louhans-Cuiseaux	58	(8)
2010–2011	Rouen	17	(0)
2011–2013	Moulins	42	(1)
2013–2016	Bourg-Péronnas	86	(4)
2016–2018	Sochaux	57	(3)
2018–2020	Dijon	28	(1)
2020–2022	Amiens	50	(4)
2022	Maccabi Haifa	15	(0)
2022–2023	Ajaccio	26	(0)
Total		379	(21)

International career^{‡}
2018–2023	Guadeloupe	10	(0)
- * Club domestic league appearances and goals as of 30 June 2023 ‡ National team caps and goals as of 1 January 2022

Mickaël David Alphonse (born 12 July 1989) is Former professional footballer who plays as a right-back. Born in metropolitan France, he represents Guadeloupe at international level.

== Club career ==
Alphonse started his career with CS Louhans-Cuiseaux and made his senior debut on 7 September 2007 in the 2–2 draw with Pau FC, coming on as a second-half substitute for Hicham Elouaari. He went on to make 58 league appearances for the club, scoring eight times.

In the summer of 2010, he transferring to FC Rouen. The following year Alphonse switched clubs again, this time joining Championnat de France Amateur side AS Moulins. He went on to spend two seasons with the club, playing almost 50 games in all competitions.

Alphonse signed for Bourg-Péronnas ahead of the 2013–14 campaign and in his second season with the club he was part of the side that finished third in the Championnat National and thereby earned promotion to Ligue 2 for the first time in the team's history.

In July 2016, Alphone signed a two-year contract with Ligue 2 club FC Sochaux Montbeliard.

In July 2018, he signed a three-year contract for Ligue 1 side Dijon.

On 21 August 2020, he became an Amiens player.

On 3 February 2022, he signed for a one-year contract with the Israeli Primer League Maccabi Haifa.

On 1 July 2022, Alphonse returned to France and signed a two-year deal with Ajaccio.

== International career ==
Alphonse was born in metropolitan France and is of Guadeloupean descent. He made his debut for the Guadeloupe national team in a 3–0 2019–20 CONCACAF Nations League qualifying win over Saint Martin on 11 September 2018.

== Career statistics ==
As of 1 June 2022

Appearances and goals by club, season and competition
Club	Season	League			National cup		League cup		Other		Total	
Club	Season	Division	Apps	Goals	Apps	Goals	Apps	Goals	Apps	Goals	Apps	Goals
Louhans-Cuiseaux	2007–08	National	3	0	0	0	0	0	0	0	3	0
Louhans-Cuiseaux	2008–09	National	23	5	2	0	0	0	0	0	25	5
Louhans-Cuiseaux	2009–10	National	32	3	2	0	0	0	0	0	34	3
Louhans-Cuiseaux	Total		58	8	4	0	0	0	0	0	62	8
Rouen	2010–11	National	17	0	3	0	0	0	0	0	20	0
Moulins	2011–12	CFA Group B	14	0	0	0	0	0	0	0	14	0
Moulins	2012–13	CFA Group B	28	1	3	0	0	0	0	0	31	1
Moulins	Total		42	1	3	0	0	0	0	0	45	1
Bourg-Péronnas	2013–14	National	29	0	2	0	0	0	0	0	31	0
Bourg-Péronnas	2014–15	National	24	1	1	0	0	0	0	0	25	1
Bourg-Péronnas	2015–16	Ligue 2	33	3	3	0	3	0	0	0	39	3
Bourg-Péronnas	Total		86	4	6	0	3	0	0	0	85	4
Sochaux	2016–17	Ligue 2	34	0	5	0	0	0	0	0	39	0
Sochaux	2017–18	Ligue 2	24	2	3	1	0	0	0	0	27	3
Sochaux	Total		58	2	8	1	0	0	0	0	66	3
Dijon	2018–19	Ligue 1	11	1	2	0	1	0	2	0	16	1
Dijon	2019–20	Ligue 1	17	0	2	0	1	0	0	0	20	0
Dijon	Total		28	1	4	0	2	0	2	0	36	1
Amiens	2020–21	Ligue 2	34	3	0	0	0	0	0	0	34	3
Amiens	2021–22	Ligue 2	16	1	1	0	0	0	0	0	17	1
Amiens	Total		50	4	1	0	0	0	0	0	51	4
Maccabi Haifa	2021–22	Israeli Premier League	15	0	3	0	0	0	0	0	18	0
Ajaccio	2022–23	Ligue 1	23	0	2	0	0	0	0	0	25	0
Career total			354	20	35	1	4	0	2	0	411	21

== Honours ==
Maccabi Haifa

- Israeli Premier League: 2021–22
