= Mathis Lachuer =

French footballer (born 2000)

Personal information
- Date of birth: 31 August 2000 (age 26)
- Place of birth: Amiens, France
- Height: 1.85 m (6 ft 1 in)
- Position: Midfielder

Team information
- Current team: Valladolid
- Number: 6

Youth career
- 2005–2013: Brest
- 2013–2015: Plouzané AC
- 2015–2019: Rennes
- 2019–2020: Amiens

Senior career*
Years	Team	Apps	(Gls)
2019–2023	Amiens II	13	(1)
2021–2023	Amiens	65	(0)
2023–2025	Mirandés	61	(3)
2025–	Valladolid	22	(0)
- * Club domestic league appearances and goals as of 9 June 2026

Mathis Lachuer (born 31 August 2000) is a French professional footballer who plays as a midfielder for Spanish club Real Valladolid.

== Club career ==
=== Amiens ===
An Amiens youth graduate, Lachuer made his professional debut in a 2–0 Ligue 2 loss to Pau FC on 2 February 2021. On 20 October 2021, he renewed his contract until 2024.

=== Mirandés ===
On 18 August 2023, Lachuer moved abroad and signed a two-year contract with Mirandés of the Spanish Segunda División.

=== Valladolid ===
On 30 August 2025, Lachuer agreed to a one-year deal with Real Valladolid also in the Spanish second division. The following 9 June, he renewed his link until 2029.

== Personal life ==
Lachuer is the son of Julien Lachuer, and the nephew of Yann Lachuer, both professional footballers. Lachuer is of Martiniquais descent through his mother.
