= Emmanuel Lomotey =

Ghanaian footballer (born 1997)

Personal information
- Full name: Emmanuel Addoquaye Lomotey
- Date of birth: 19 December 1997 (age 28)
- Place of birth: Accra, Ghana
- Height: 1.90 m (6 ft 3 in)
- Position: Centre-back

Team information
- Current team: Ethnikos Achna
- Number: 12

Youth career
- Dreams

Senior career*
Years	Team	Apps	(Gls)
2016–2018	Dreams	39	(11)
2017–2018	→ Extremadura B (loan)	13	(0)
2017–2018	→ Extremadura (loan)	9	(0)
2018–2020	Extremadura	21	(1)
2018–2019	→ Villarreal B (loan)	18	(0)
2020–2022	Amiens	55	(2)
2022–2024	Malmö FF	3	(0)
2023–2024	→ Ethnikos Achna (loan)	24	(2)
2024–	Ethnikos Achna	52	(5)

International career^{‡}
2017–	Ghana	6	(0)
- * Club domestic league appearances and goals as of 14 June 2026 ‡ National team caps and goals as of 20:31, 31 March 2024 (UTC)

Emmanuel Addoquaye Lomotey (born 19 December 1997) is a Ghanaian professional footballer who plays as a midfielder for Ethnikos Achna.

== Club career ==
=== Dreams FC ===
Lomotey was born in Accra, Ghana. He finished his formation with Dreams FC. He made his professional – and Ghana Premier League – debut on 21 February 2016, starting in a 1–0 away win against Cape Coast Ebusua Dwarfs.

Lomotey scored his first professional goal on 12 March 2016, netting the opener in a 1–1 home draw against Wa All Stars FC. He suffered relegation in his first season, but achieved immediate promotion from Ghana Division One in his second by contributing with ten goals in 24 appearances.

=== Extremadura UD ===
On 30 August 2017, Lomotey moved abroad after agreeing to a one-year loan deal with Segunda División B side Extremadura UD. Initially assigned to the reserves in Tercera División, he started to feature regularly for the first team from March 2018.

On 30 June 2018, Córdoba CF announced that Lomotey signed a three-year contract with the club, being initially assigned to the B-side also in the third division. On 18 July, however, he was bought outright by Extremadura and was immediately loaned to Villarreal CF with a buyout clause.

=== Amiens SC ===
In August 2020, Emmanuel moved to Amiens SC in Ligue 2 on a four-year deal.

=== Malmö FF ===
In August 2022, Emmanuel moved to Malmö FF.

On 12 July 2023, Lomotey signed for Cypriot First Division club Ethinkos Achna on a season-long loan deal.

== International career ==
On 25 May 2017, Lomotey made his international debut for Ghana, after coming on as a second-half substitute for Gideon Waja in a 1–1 non-FIFA friendly home draw against Benin.
