= 2025–26 FC Girondins de Bordeaux season =

Girondins de Bordeaux
2025–26 season
- Owner: Gérard López
- Chairman: Gérard López
- Head coach: Bruno Irles (until 29 March); Rio Mavuba (from 29 March)
- Stadium: Stade Atlantique
- National 2: 2nd
- Coupe de France: Round of 64
- Top goalscorer: League: Royce Openda (15); All: Royce Openda (14)
| Home colours | Away colours | Third colours |

The 2025–26 season is the 144th season in the existence of FC Girondins de Bordeaux and their 2nd season in Championnat National 2 - Group A. They are also due to compete in the Coupe de France. Bordeaux were excluded from the national championships due to financial mismanagement.

== Players ==
=== Current squad ===
As of 23 February 2026

Note: Flags indicate national team as defined under FIFA eligibility rules; some limited exceptions apply. Players may hold more than one non-FIFA nationality.

| No. | Pos. | Nation | Player |
|---|---|---|---|
| 1 | GK | NED | Jan Hoekstra |
| 2 | DF | FRA | Léo Jousselin |
| 5 | DF | FRA | Jean Grillot (captain) |
| 6 | MF | FRA | Guillaume Odru |
| 7 | FW | FRA | Soufiane Bahassa |
| 8 | MF | FRA | Abou Ba |
| 9 | FW | FRA | Matthieu Villette |
| 10 | MF | TUN | Faïssal Mannaï |
| 11 | FW | SMN | Pierre-Bertrand Arné |
| 14 | FW | GAB | Royce Openda |
| 17 | DF | FRA | Ruben Droehnlé |
| 18 | FW | FRA | Ludéric Etonde |

| No. | Pos. | Nation | Player |
|---|---|---|---|
| 19 | FW | FRA | Luigi Rizaldos |
| 20 | DF | MLI | Nadjib Cissé |
| 21 | DF | MAR | Oualid El Hajjam |
| 22 | DF | MLI | Almamy Touré |
| 24 | MF | MTN | Adama Diop |
| 26 | FW | FRA | Yanis Merdji |
| 27 | FW | FRA | Steve Shamal |
| 28 | DF | FRA | Driss Trichard |
| 29 | MF | FRA | Tidyane Diagouraga |
| 30 | GK | MLI | Lassana Diabaté |
| — | FW | FRA | Noah Ramon |

== Pre-season and friendlies ==
| 20 July 2025 Friendly | Girondins | 3–2 | AS Cannes | Béziers |
| 17:00 CET (UTC+1:00) | Etonde (?); Rizaldos (?); Yatera (?) | | ? (?) ? (?) | Stadium: Stade de la Présidente |

| 1 August 2025 Friendly | Girondins | 1–1 | US Colomiers Football | Le Haillan |
| 17:00 CET (UTC+1:00) | Trichard (?) | | ? (?) | Stadium: Centre d'entrainement FCGB |

| 2 August 2025 Friendly | FC Bassin d'Arcachon | 0–3 | Girondins | Arcachon |
| 17:00 CET (UTC+1:00) | | | Vandenabeele (?); Villette (?); Trichard (?) | Stadium: Stade Jean Brousse |

| 9 August 2025 Friendly | Girondins | 1–1 | Aviron Bayonnais FC | Tarnos |
| 17:00 CET (UTC+1:00) | Grillot (?) | | ? (?) | Stadium: Stade Intercommunal |

== Competitions ==
=== Championnat National 2 ===
==== League table ====
| Pos | Team | Pld | W | D | L | GF | GA | GD | Pts | Promotion or relegation |
|---|---|---|---|---|---|---|---|---|---|---|
| 1 | La Roche (C, P) | 30 | 19 | 8 | 3 | 61 | 27 | +34 | 65 | Promotion to Ligue 3 |
| 2 | Bordeaux (Note: Bordeaux were excluded from the national championships due to financial mismanagement.) (D, R) | 30 | 19 | 5 | 6 | 51 | 28 | +23 | 62 | Demoted to Régional |
| 3 | Bayonne | 30 | 17 | 4 | 9 | 42 | 27 | +15 | 55 | |
| 4 | Saint-Malo | 30 | 13 | 11 | 6 | 43 | 29 | +14 | 50 | |
| 5 | Les Herbiers | 30 | 14 | 7 | 9 | 45 | 33 | +12 | 49 | |
| 6 | Angoulême | 30 | 11 | 10 | 9 | 33 | 36 | −3 | 43 | |
| 7 | Dinan Léhon | 30 | 12 | 5 | 13 | 44 | 45 | −1 | 41 | |
| 8 | Avranches | 30 | 10 | 10 | 10 | 46 | 41 | +5 | 40 | |
| 9 | Chauray | 30 | 11 | 5 | 14 | 35 | 38 | −3 | 38 | |
| 10 | Saint-Colomban Locminé | 30 | 9 | 10 | 11 | 31 | 34 | −3 | 37 | |
| 11 | Montlouis | 30 | 7 | 10 | 13 | 42 | 50 | −8 | 31 | |
| 12 | Lorient (res) | 30 | 9 | 5 | 16 | 38 | 51 | −13 | 31 (Note: Lorient (res) were deducted one point.) | |
| 13 | Châteaubriant | 30 | 8 | 6 | 16 | 25 | 47 | −22 | 30 | |
| 14 | Granville | 30 | 6 | 11 | 13 | 32 | 41 | −9 | 29 | Spared from relegation |
| 15 | Saumur | 30 | 6 | 10 | 14 | 37 | 56 | −19 | 28 | Spared from relegation |
| 16 | Stade Poitevin (Note: Stade Poitevin were excluded from the national championships due to financial mismanagement.) (D, R) | 30 | 5 | 11 | 14 | 21 | 43 | −22 | 25 (Note: Stade Poitevin were deducted one point.) | Demoted to Régional |

Source: soccerway, fff
Rules for classification: 1) points; 2) head-to-head results; 3) head-to-head goal difference; 4) goal difference; 5) number of goals scored; 6) fair play points; 7) draw
(C) Champions; (D) Disqualified; (P) Promoted; (R) Relegated

=== Matches ===
| 16 August 2025 1 | Girondins | 0–0 | Avranches | Bordeaux |
| 22:00 CET (UTC+1:00) | | Report | | Stadium: Stade Atlantique |

| 23 August 2025 2 | Girondins | 0–1 | Granville | Bordeaux |
| 19:00 CET (UTC+1:00) | | Report | ? 67' | Stadium: Stade Atlantique |

| 30 August 2025 3 | Châteaubriant | 1–3 | Girondins | Châteaubriant |
| 19:00 CET (UTC+1:00) | ? 35' | | Openda 55'; Villette 65'; Etonde 70' | Stadium: Stade de la Ville en Bois |

| 6 September 2025 4 | Girondins | 2–1 | Saumur | Bordeaux |
| 19:00 CET (UTC+1:00) | Etonde 19'; Ba 79' | | ? 64' | Stadium: Stade Atlantique |

| 13 September 2025 5 | Saint-Malo | 2–1 | Girondins | Saint-Malo |
| 19:00 CET (UTC+1:00) | ? 45+1' (pen.) ? 81' | | Mannaï 84' | Stadium: Stade de Marville |

| 20 September 2025 6 | Girondins | 1–1 | Angoulême | Bordeaux |
| 19:00 CET (UTC+1:00) | Villette 30' | | ? 47' | Stadium: Stade Atlantique |

| 4 October 2025 7 | Stade Poitevin | 0–3 | Girondins | Poitiers |
| 19:00 CET (UTC+1:00) | | | Etonde 26', 45'; Villette 60' | Stadium: Stade Michel-Amand |

| 18 October 2025 8 | Girondins | 3–0 | La Roche | Bordeaux |
| 19:00 CET (UTC+1:00) | Etonde 30'; Villette 45+4', 85' | | | Stadium: Stade Atlantique |

| 1 November 2025 9 | Chauray | 0–1 | Girondins | Chauray |
| 19:00 CET (UTC+1:00) | | | Shamal 9' | Stadium: Stade Municipal |

| 8 November 2025 10 | Girondins | 2–1 | Saint-Colomban Locminé | Bordeaux |
| 19:00 CET (UTC+1:00) | Trichard 48'; Diagouraga 52' | | ? 38' | Stadium: Stade Atlantique |

| 22 November 2025 11 | FC Lorient II | 0–2 | Girondins | Lorient |
| 18:00 CET (UTC+1:00) | | | Openda 25'; Etonde 72' | Stadium: Stade du Moustoir |

| 6 December 2025 12 | Girondins | 2–0 | Dinan Léhon | Bordeaux |
| 19:00 CET (UTC+1:00) | Openda 63', 90+5' | | | Stadium: Stade Atlantique |

| 13 December 2025 13 | Montlouis | 2–2 | Girondins | Tours |
| 19:00 CET (UTC+1:00) | ? 11'; Grillot 32' (o.g.) | | Openda 26'; Shamal 72' | Stadium: Stade de la Vallée du Cher |

| 10 January 2026 14 | Girondins | 1–0 | Bayonnais | Bordeaux |
| 19:00 CET (UTC+1:00) | Villette 9' | | | Stadium: Stade Atlantique |

| 17 January 2026 15 | Les Herbiers | 2–1 | Girondins | Les Herbiers |
| 19:00 CET (UTC+1:00) | ? 28' ? 34' | | Villette 90+6' | Stadium: Stade Massabielle |

| 24 January 2026 16 | Granville | 2–3 | Girondins | Granville |
| 19:00 CET (UTC+1:00) | ? 11' ? 34' | | Etonde 23'; Openda 45' (pen.); Arné 89' | Stadium: Stade Louis Dior |

| 7 February 2026 17 | Girondins | 2–1 | Châteaubriant | Bordeaux |
| 19:00 CET (UTC+1:00) | Etonde 53'; Openda 80' | | ? 90+4' | Stadium: Stade Atlantique |

| 14 February 2026 18 | Saumur | 0–2 | Girondins | Saumur |
| 19:00 CET (UTC+1:00) | | | Openda 2'; Villette 8' | Stadium: Stade des Rives du Thouet |

| 21 February 2026 19 | Girondins | 1–0 | Saint-Malo | Bordeaux |
| 19:00 CET (UTC+1:00) | Openda 8' | | | Stadium: Stade Atlantique |

| 6 March 2026 20 | Angoulême | 0–0 | Girondins | Angoulême |
| 21:00 CET (UTC+1:00) | | | | Stadium: Stade Camille-Lebon |

| 14 March 2026 21 | Girondins | 1–0 | Stade Poitevin | Bordeaux |
| 19:00 CET (UTC+1:00) | Openda 56' | | | Stadium: Stade Atlantique |

| 21 March 2026 22 | La Roche | 1–0 | Girondins | La Roche-sur-Yon |
| 19:00 CET (UTC+1:00) | ? 82' | | | Stadium: Stade Henri Desgrange |

| 28 March 2026 23 | Girondins | 1–3 | Chauray | Bordeaux |
| 19:00 CET (UTC+1:00) | Etonde 51' | | ? 1' ? 4', 33' | Stadium: Stade Atlantique |

| 4 April 2026 24 | Saint-Colomban Locminé | 1–2 | Girondins | Locminé |
| 19:00 CET (UTC+1:00) | ? 90' | | Ba 48'; Diagouraga 55' | Stadium: Stade du Pigeon Blanc |

| 11 April 2026 25 | Girondins | 2–3 | FC Lorient II | Bordeaux |
| 19:00 CET (UTC+1:00) | Grillot 10'; Shamal 86' | | ? 63' ? 70' ? 90+7' | Stadium: Stade Atlantique |

| 18 April 2026 26 | Dinan Léhon | 1–3 | Girondins | Dinan |
| 19:00 CET (UTC+1:00) | ? 1' | | Openda 42'; Etonde 72'; Villette 90' | Stadium: Stade du Clos Gastel |

| 25 April 2026 27 | Girondins | 4–1 | Montlouis | Bordeaux |
| 19:00 CET (UTC+1:00) | Openda 33'; Toure 40' (o.g.); Villette 48'; Touré 90' | | ? 77' | Stadium: Stade Atlantique |

| 2 May 2026 28 | Bayonnais | 1–2 | Girondins | Bayonne |
| 19:00 CET (UTC+1:00) | ? 12' | | Odru 41'; Villette 48' | Stadium: Stade Didier Deschamps |

| 9 May 2026 29 | Girondins | 1–0 | Les Herbiers | Bordeaux |
| 19:00 CET (UTC+1:00) | Openda 63' | | | Stadium: Stade Atlantique |

| 16 May 2026 30 | Avranches | 3–3 | Girondins | Avranches |
| 19:00 CET (UTC+1:00) | ? 46', 76' (pen.) ? 79' | | Dudouit 4' (o.g.); Openda 13'; Diagouraga 52' | Stadium: Stade René Fenouillère |

=== Coupe de France ===
| 27 September 2025 Round 4 | Bergerac | 1–2 | Girondins | Bergerac |
| 20:00 CET (UTC+1:00) | ? (?) | | Bahassa 55'; Shamal 57' | Stadium: Stade de Campréal |

| 11 October 2025 Round 5 | Sporting Club Tulle Corrèze | 0–1 | Girondins | Corrèze |
| 20:00 CET (UTC+1:00) | | | Odru (?) | Stadium: Stade Alexandre Ceuille |

| 25 October 2025 Round 6 | Etoile Sportive de Boulazac | 0–4 | Girondins | Boulazac |
| 19:00 CET (UTC+1:00) | | | Diagouraga (?); Openda (?); Odru (?); Shamal (?) | Stadium: Stade Francis-Rongérias |

| 16 November 2025 Round 7 | Entente Boé Bon-Encontre | 0–1 | Girondins | Agen |
| 16:45 CET (UTC+1:00) | | | Bahassa 56' | Stadium: Stade Armandie |

| 29 November 2025 Round 8 | AS Mazères Uzos Rontignon | 3–4 | Girondins | Pau |
| 19:00 CET (UTC+1:00) | ? 3' ? 33' ? 45+3' | | Droehnlé 49'; Shamal 51'; Villette 63', 82' | Stadium: Nouste Camp |

| 21 December 2025 Round of 64 | Le Puy | 1–0 | Girondins | Le Puy-en-Velay |
| 18:30 CET (UTC+1:00) | ? 90+1' (pen.) | | | Stadium: Stade Charles Massot |

== Statistics ==
=== Appearances and goals ===
Players with no appearances are not included on the list.

As of match played 16 May 2026

| No. | Pos | Nat | Player | Total | | Ch. National 2 - Group A | | Coupe de France | |
| No. | Pos | Nat | Player | Apps | Goals | Apps | Goals | Apps | Goals |
|---|---|---|---|---|---|---|---|---|---|
| 5 | DF | (France) FRA | Grillot | 0 | 1 | 0 | 1 | 0 | 0 |
| 6 | MF | (France) FRA | Odru | 0 | 3 | 0 | 1 | 0 | 2 |
| 7 | MF | (France) FRA | Bahassa | 0 | 2 | 0 | 0 | 0 | 2 |
| 8 | MF | (France) FRA | Ba | 0 | 2 | 0 | 2 | 0 | 0 |
| 9 | FW | (France) FRA | Villette | 0 | 13 | 0 | 11 | 0 | 2 |
| 10 | MF | (Tunisia) TUN | Mannaï | 0 | 1 | 0 | 1 | 0 | 0 |
| 11 | FW | (Collectivity of Saint Martin) SMN | Arné | 0 | 1 | 0 | 1 | 0 | 0 |
| 14 | FW | (Gabon) GAB | Openda | 0 | 15 | 0 | 14 | 0 | 1 |
| 17 | DF | (France) FRA | Droehnlé | 0 | 1 | 0 | 0 | 0 | 1 |
| 18 | FW | (France) FRA | Etonde | 0 | 10 | 0 | 10 | 0 | 0 |
| 22 | DF | (Mali) MLI | Touré | 0 | 1 | 0 | 1 | 0 | 0 |
| 27 | FW | (France) FRA | Shamal | 0 | 6 | 0 | 3 | 0 | 3 |
| 28 | DF | (France) FRA | Trichard | 0 | 1 | 0 | 1 | 0 | 0 |
| 29 | MF | (France) FRA | Diagouraga | 0 | 4 | 0 | 3 | 0 | 1 |
Players sold, released or loaned out during the season:

== Transfers ==
=== Transfers in ===
| Date | Position | Nationality | Name | From | Fee | Ref. |
|---|---|---|---|---|---|---|
| 1 July 2025 | FW | (France) | Matthieu Villette | La Roche VF | Free | |
| 7 July 2025 | MF | (France) | Guillaume Odru | (United Arab Emirates) Al-Fujairah SC | Free | |
| 7 July 2025 | FW | (Gabon) | Royce Openda | FC Chambly Oise | Free | |
| 7 July 2025 | FW | (France) | Ludéric Etonde | Les Herbiers VF | Free | |
| 7 July 2025 | FW | (France) | Steve Shamal | FC Martigues | Free | |
| 7 July 2025 | MF | (France) | Abou Ba | Villefranche Beaujolais | Free | |
| 7 July 2025 | DF | (France) | Éric Vandenabeele | Rodez AF | Free | |
| 10 July 2025 | MF | (Tunisia) | Faïssal Mannaï | Free Agent | Free | |
| 10 July 2025 | MF | (France) | Tidyane Diagouraga | Free Agent | Free | |
| 14 July 2025 | DF | (France) | Léo Jousselin | (Luxembourg) FC Progrès Niederkorn | Undisclosed | |
| 15 July 2025 | DF | (France) | Ruben Droehnlé | (Belgium) RFC Seraing | Free | |
| 16 July 2025 | GK | (Benin) | Dava David Agossa | FC Gueugnon | Free | |
| 17 July 2025 | MF | (Mauritania) | Adama Diop | Bergerac Périgord FC | Free | |
| 18 July 2025 | DF | (Mali) | Nadjib Cissé | Quevilly-Rouen Métropole | Free | |
| 25 July 2025 | GK | (Netherlands) | Jan Hoekstra | (Netherlands) FC Emmen | Undisclosed | |
| 10 September 2025 | DF | (Morocco) | Oualid El Hajjam | Le Havre AC | Free | |
| 16 December 2025 | FW | (Collectivity of Saint Martin) | Pierre-Bertrand Arné | FC Chauray | Free | |
| 13 January 2026 | DF | (Mali) | Almamy Touré | Free Agent | Free | |

=== Transfers out ===
| Date | Position | Nationality | Name | To | Fee | Ref. |
|---|---|---|---|---|---|---|
| 30 June 2025 | MF | (France) | Younès Kaabouni | Free Agent | End of contract | |
| 30 June 2025 | DF | (France) | Sékou Fofana | Free Agent | End of contract | |
| 30 June 2025 | FW | (Senegal) | Pape Massar Djitte | Free Agent | End of contract | |
| 30 June 2025 | MF | (France) | Nolan Bonte | Entente Feignies Aulnoye FC | End of contract | |
| 30 June 2025 | DF | (Comoros) | Glenn Younousse | Free Agent | End of contract | |
| 30 June 2025 | GK | (France) | Over Mandanda | Free Agent | End of contract | |
| 30 June 2025 | DF | (France) | Nassim Ranem | Stade Reims | End of contract | |
| 30 June 2025 | MF | (France) | Emeric Depussay | Free Agent | End of contract | |
| 30 June 2025 | DF | (Benin) | Youssouf Assogba | Free Agent | End of contract | |
| 1 July 2025 | MF | (France) | Junah Zuccolotto | SA Gazinet Cestas | Free | |
| 1 July 2025 | FW | (France) | Hamidou Yameogo | Stade Bordelais | Free | |
| 1 July 2025 | FW | (Senegal) | Malick Seck | FC Albères Argelès | Free | |
| 1 July 2025 | DF | (France) | Nathanaël Bai | US Saint-Malo | Free | |
| 1 July 2025 | DF | (France) | Adrien Louveau | US Créteil-Lusitanos | Free | |
| 1 July 2025 | MF | (Tunisia) | Issam Ben Khémis | SAS Épinal | Free | |
| 1 July 2025 | FW | (France) | Jérémy Grain | FC Chauray | Free | |
| 4 July 2025 | DF | (France) | Nama Fofana | US Créteil-Lusitanos | Free | |
| 9 July 2025 | MF | (Uganda) | Travis Mutyaba | (Tunisia) CS Sfaxien | Free | |
| 12 July 2025 | FW | (England) | Andy Carroll | (England) Dagenham & Redbridge FC | Free | |
| 14 July 2025 | DF | (France) | Omar Sané | Stade Bordelais | Free | |
| 16 July 2025 | GK | (France) | Georges Grimaud | US Lège-Cap-Ferret | Free | |
| 23 July 2025 | MF | (France) | N'Famady Diaby | (Belgium) Royale Union Tubize-Braine | Free | |
| 27 July 2025 | FW | (England) | Amadou Diallo | (Portugal) UD Oliveirense | Free | |
| 25 August 2025 | DF | (Senegal) | Djibril Diaw | (Romania) FC Botoșani | Free | |
| 17 September 2025 | MF | (Ivory Coast) | Trazié Thomas | (Israel) Hapoel Ramat Gan Givatayim | Free | |
| 25 November 2025 | DF | (Central African Republic) | Cédric Yambéré | Free Agent | Released | |
| 20 January 2026 | DF | (France) | Éric Vandenabeele | Retired | Released | |
| 17 February 2026 | GK | (Benin) | Dava David Agossa | Stade Beaucairois FC | Free | |
| 23 February 2026 | FW | (Ivory Coast) | Etienne Beugre | (Kazakhstan) FC Kyzylzhar | Free | |
