= 2026–27 FC Girondins de Bordeaux season =

Girondins de Bordeaux
2026–27 season
- Owner: Gérard López
- Chairman: Gérard López
- Head coach: Rio Mavuba
- Stadium: Stade Atlantique
- Régional 1: TBD
Home colours	Away colours	Third colours

The 2026–27 season is the 145th season in the existence of FC Girondins de Bordeaux and their 1st season in Régional 1.

== Players ==
=== Current squad ===
As of 1 August 2026

Note: Flags indicate national team as defined under FIFA eligibility rules; some limited exceptions apply. Players may hold more than one non-FIFA nationality.

No.	Pos.	Nation	Player
1	GK	NED	Jan Hoekstra
2	DF	FRA	Léo Jousselin
5	DF	FRA	Jean Grillot (captain)
6	MF	FRA	Guillaume Odru
7	FW	FRA	Soufiane Bahassa
8	MF	FRA	Abou Ba
10	MF	TUN	Faïssal Mannaï
17	DF	FRA	Ruben Droehnlé
20	DF	MLI	Nadjib Cissé
21	DF	MAR	Oualid El Hajjam
22	DF	MLI	Almamy Touré

No.	Pos.	Nation	Player
27	FW	FRA	Steve Shamal
28	DF	FRA	Driss Trichard
29	MF	FRA	Tidyane Diagouraga
30	GK	MLI	Lassana Diabaté
—	DF	FRA	Gabriel Mbala
—	DF	FRA	Brayan Djadja (on loan from Dijon)
—	MF	FRA	Pierre Lavenant
—	FW	SEN	Chérif Diallo
—	FW	USA	Patrick Koffi
—	FW	FRA	Noah Ramon

== Statistics ==
=== Appearances and goals ===
Players with no appearances are not included on the list.

As of match played 16 May 2026

No.	Pos	Nat	Player	Total		Ch. National 1 - Group A		Coupe de France	
No.	Pos	Nat	Player	Apps	Goals	Apps	Goals	Apps	Goals
Players sold, released or loaned out during the season:

== Transfers ==
=== Transfers in ===
Date	Name	Nationality	Position	From	Fee	Ref.
1 July 2026	Patrick Koffi	(United States)	FW	FC Versailles 78	Free	
1 July 2026	Pierre Lavenant	(France)	MF	Les Herbiers VF	Free	
1 July 2026	Djibril Bangoura	(Guinea)	MF	US Saint-Malo	Free	
1 July 2026	Chérif Diallo	(Senegal)	FW	Voltigeurs de Châteaubriant	Free	
8 July 2026	Gabriel Mbala	(France)	DF	US Torcy	Free	

=== Loans in ===
Date	Name	Nationality	Position	From	Date until	Ref.
8 July 2026	Brayan Djadja	(France)	DF	Dijon FCO	30 June 2027	

=== Transfers out ===
Date	Name	Nationality	Position	To	Fee	Ref.
30 June 2026	Ludéric Etonde	(France)	FW	Free Agent	End of contract	
30 June 2026	Adama Diop	(Mauritania)	MF	Free Agent	End of contract	
30 June 2026	Yanis Merdji	(Mauritania)	MF	Free Agent	End of contract	
1 July 2026	Royce Openda	(Gabon)	FW	Pau FC	Free	
1 July 2026	Pierre-Bertrand Arné	(Collectivity of Saint Martin)	FW	Bourges Foot 18	Free	
1 July 2026	Luigi Rizaldos	(France)	FW	FC Montlouis	Free	
27 July 2026	Djibril Bangoura	(Guinea)	MF	VFC La Roche	Free	
28 July 2026	Matthieu Villette	(France)	FW	VFC La Roche	Free	
