= 2024–25 FC Girondins de Bordeaux season =

FC Girondins de Bordeaux
2024–25 season
- Owner: Gérard López
- Chairman: Gérard López
- Head coach: Bruno Irles
- Stadium: Matmut Atlantique
- National 2: 4th
- Coupe de France: Round of 64
- Top goalscorer: League: Andy Carroll (11); All: Andy Carroll (11)
Home colours	Away colours

The 2024–25 season is the 143rd season in the existence of FC Girondins de Bordeaux and their first season in Championnat National 2. They are also due to compete in the Coupe de France.

Following continued financial decline and an inability to find new investment or ownership, the club were forced into filing for bankruptcy and relinquishing their professional status. This action forced the DNCG and the LFP to sanction the club with an administrative relegation to the Championnat National. After a removed appeal, Les Girondins accepted the decision and subsequently started a receivership procedure in order to begin the restructuring plans at the club. However, this invoked further punishment from the DNCG and resulted in a decision to relegate the club to the Championnat National 2. Despite an appeal, Bordeaux's fate was confirmed on 16 August 2024, marking the first time the club would play outside of the top two divisions since they became professional in 1936.

The Championnat National 2 began on 16 August 2024; however, due to having an insufficient number of players, Bordeaux postponed their opening two fixtures, with the club beginning their campaign on 31 August 2024.

== Players ==
=== First-team squad ===
As of 30 June 2025

Note: Flags indicate national team as defined under FIFA eligibility rules; some limited exceptions apply. Players may hold more than one non-FIFA nationality.

No.	Pos.	Nation	Player
1	GK	MLI	Lassana Diabaté
2	DF	FRA	Nama Fofana
3	DF	FRA	Nathanaël Bai
4	DF	CAF	Cédric Yambéré (captain)
5	DF	FRA	Jean Grillot
7	MF	FRA	Soufiane Bahassa
8	MF	CIV	Trazié Thomas
9	FW	ENG	Andy Carroll
10	FW	FRA	Yanis Merdji
11	FW	ENG	Amadou Diallo
12	MF	FRA	N'Famady Diaby
14	FW	CIV	Etienne Beugre
15	DF	BEN	Youssouf Assogba
16	GK	FRA	Georges Grimaud
18	MF	TUN	Issam Ben Khemis
20	MF	UGA	Travis Mutyaba
22	FW	FRA	Yvan Ikia Dimi (on loan from Amiens)

No.	Pos.	Nation	Player
23	DF	SEN	Djibril Diaw
24	DF	FRA	Adrien Louveau
26	MF	FRA	Emeric Depussay
28	DF	FRA	Driss Trichard
—	GK	FRA	Over Mandanda
—	DF	FRA	Sékou Fofana
—	DF	FRA	Omar Sané
—	DF	COM	Glenn Younousse
—	MF	FRA	Nolan Bonte
—	MF	FRA	Younès Kaabouni
—	MF	FRA	Junah Zuccolotto
—	FW	SEN	Pape Massar Djitte
—	FW	FRA	Jérémy Grain
—	FW	FRA	Noah Ramon
—	FW	SEN	Malick Seck
—	FW	FRA	Hamidou Yameogo

== Pre-season and friendlies ==
The club would compete in just one friendly, on 24 July 2024, before their pre-season was cancelled amid the bankruptcy issues.

24 July 2024 1	Bordeaux	2 – 3	Southampton	Girona, Spain
10:00 GMT	Diallo 20'; Marques da Silva 82'	Report	Michelin 19' (o.g.); Amo-Ameyaw 50'; Mara 56'	Attendance: Behind closed doors

== Competitions ==
=== Overall record ===
Competition	First match	Last match	Starting round	Final position	Record							
Competition	First match	Last match	Starting round	Final position	Pld	W	D	L	GF	GA	GD	Win %
Championnat National 2	31 August 2024	26 April 2025	Matchday 1	TBD	0	0	0	0	0	0	+0	—
Coupe de France	TBD	TBD	Fourth round	TBD	0	0	0	0	0	0	+0	—
Total					0	0	0	0	0	0	+0	—

Source: Soccerway

=== Championnat National 2 ===
==== League table ====
Pos	Team	Pld	W	D	L	GF	GA	GD	Pts	Promotion or relegation
1	Stade Briochin (C, P)	30	18	5	7	49	34	+15	59	Promotion to National
2	Les Herbiers	30	16	7	7	53	24	+29	55	
3	Saint-Malo	30	14	11	5	43	27	+16	53	
4	Bordeaux	30	14	6	10	38	32	+6	48	
5	La Roche	30	13	9	8	42	27	+15	48	
6	Blois	30	13	8	9	46	36	+10	47	
7	Saint-Colomban Locminé	30	13	7	10	39	33	+6	46	
8	Bourges	30	10	11	9	46	43	+3	41	
9	Avranches	30	11	8	11	46	43	+3	41	
10	Dinan Léhon	30	10	8	12	38	49	−11	38	
11	Châteaubriant	30	9	10	11	36	43	−7	37	
12	Saint-Pryvé Saint-Hilaire	30	9	9	12	40	37	+3	36	
13	Poitiers	30	8	9	13	36	48	−12	33	
14	Granville	30	8	8	14	36	47	−11	32	Spared from relegation
15	Saumur	30	7	7	16	29	54	−25	28	Spared from relegation
16	Le Poiré-sur-Vie (R)	30	3	5	22	18	58	−40	14	Relegation to National 3

Source: soccerway
Rules for classification: 1) points; 2) head-to-head results; 3) head-to-head goal difference; 4) goal difference; 5) number of goals scored; 6) fair play points; 7) draw
(C) Champions; (P) Promoted; (R) Relegated

==== Results summary ====
Overall								Home						Away					
Pld	W	D	L	GF	GA	GD	Pts	W	D	L	GF	GA	GD	W	D	L	GF	GA	GD
2	0	1	1	2	3	−1	1	0	1	0	1	1	0	0	0	1	1	2	−1

Source: Soccerway

==== Results by round ====
Round	1	2	3	4	5	6	7	8	9	10	11	12	13	14	15	16	17	18	19	20	21	22	23	24	25	26	27	28	29	30
Ground	H	A	H	A	H	H	A	H	A	H	A	H	A	H	A	H	A	H	A	A	H	A	H	A	H	A	H	A	H	A
Result	L	W	D	L	D	D	W	W	D	W	D	D	W	W	W	W	W	W	L	L	L	L	L	W	W	L	W	L	W	L
Position	15	15	13	14												2				2										

Source: Soccerway
A = Away; H = Home; W = Win; D = Draw; L = Loss

==== Matches ====
31 August 2024 3	Girondins	1 – 1	Poitevin	Le Bouscat
19:00	Diabaté 90+3'		Nilor 50'	Stadium: Stade Sainte-Germaine; Referee: Dorian Bovolenta

7 September 2024 4	Dinan Léhon	2 – 1	Girondins	Dinan
19:00	Jacquemin 19' Vermet 25'		Fofana 90+3'	Stadium: Stade du Clos Gastel; Referee: Hakim Mahaoudi

14 September 2024 5	Girondins	0 – 0	Bourges Foot 18	Le Bouscat
19:00				Stadium: Stade Sainte-Germaine; Referee: Alexis Guillon

21 September 2024 6	Girondins	2 – 2	Châteaubriant	Bordeaux
19:00	Carroll 72', 87'	Report	36', 42' Leye	Stadium: Matmut Atlantique; Referee: Gaetan Martin

5 October 2024 7	Saumur	1 – 2	Girondins	Saumur
19:00	Bouhoutt 73' (pen.)	Report	Carroll 34', 84'	Stadium: Stade des Rives du Thouet; Referee: Valentin Cardon

19 October 2024 8	Girondins	1 – 0	Avranches	Bordeaux
19:00	Carroll 22'			Stadium: Matmut Atlantique; Referee: Marc Michout

2 November 2024 9	Blois	1 – 1	Girondins	Blois
19:00	? 40'		Carroll 63'	Stadium: Stade Allées Jean Leroi; Referee: Henri Dutech

9 November 2024 10	Girondins	2 – 0	Saint-Pryvé	Bordeaux
19:00	Merdji 64', 77'			Stadium: Matmut Atlantique; Referee: Jean Dasque

13 November 2024 2	Poiré-sur-Vie	0 – 1	Girondins	Le Poiré-sur-Vie
20:00			Carroll 3'	Stadium: Stade de l'Idonnière; Referee: Kevin Barbin

23 November 2024 11	Saint-Malo	1 – 1	Girondins	Saint-Malo
19:00	? 41'		Bahassa 49'	Stadium: Stade de Marville; Referee: Gaëtan Deneuve

7 December 2024 12	Girondins	0 – 0	Stade Briochin	Bordeaux
19:00				Stadium: Matmut Atlantique; Referee: Louis Lungeri

14 December 2024 13	La Roche	0 – 1	Girondins	La Roche-sur-Yon
19:00			Merdji 22'	Stadium: Stade Henri Desgranges; Referee: Timothe Bonnot

4 January 2025 1	Girondins	1 – 2	Saint-Colomban Locminé	Bordeaux
18:00 CET (UTC+1:00)	N. Bai (yellow card) 66'; L. Diabaté (yellow card) 70'; Merdji 73'; Depussay (yellow card) 76'; Yambéré (yellow card) 82', (yellow card) 90+5' (red card); Trichard (red card) 90+9'	Report	R. Freitas 33'; I. Sy (yellow card) 75'; A. Le Nédic (yellow card) 77'; C. Benamara 90+7'	Stadium: Matmut Atlantique; Attendance: 9,000; Referee: Valentin Giorgetti; Assistant referees: Julien Grellier; Nicolas Millet

11 January 2025 15	US Granville	1 – 2	Girondins	Granville
18:00 CET (UTC+1:00)	? 90+3' (pen.)	Report	Carroll 85'; Ranem 90+6'	Stadium: Stade Louis Dior; Referee: Louis Flachot

18 January 2025 16	Girondins	2 – 0	Poiré-sur-Vie	Bordeaux
18:00 CET (UTC+1:00)	Merdji 5'; Bahassa 85'	Report		Stadium: Matmut Atlantique; Referee: Julien Gueguen

25 January 2025 17	Stade Poitevin FC	1 – 2	Girondins	Poitiers
18:00 CET (UTC+1:00)	? 3'	Report	Merdji 47' (pen.); Ikia Dimi 76'	Stadium: Stade Michel-Amand; Referee: Kevin Barbin

1 February 2025 14	Girondins	2 – 0	Les Herbiers VF	Bordeaux
18:00 CET (UTC+1:00)	Ikia Dimi 25'; Thomas 72'	Report		Stadium: Matmut Atlantique; Referee: Arnaud Baert

8 February 2025 18	Girondins	3 – 1	Dinan Léhon FC	Bordeaux
7:00 PM	Beugre 17'; Yambéré 24'; Merdji 74'	Report	? 85'	Stadium: Matmut Atlantique

15 February 2025 19	Bourges Foot 18	4 – 3	Girondins	Bourges
5:00 PM	? 16', 27', 90' ? 61'	Report	Ikia Dimi 45'; Ranem 72'; Merdji 89'	Stadium: Stade Jacques Rimbault

22 February 2025 20	Châteaubriant	2 – 1	Girondins	Châteaubriant
7:00 PM	? 55' ? 72'	Report	Depussay 50'	Stadium: Stade de la Ville en Bois

8 March 2025 21	Girondins	0 – 1	Olympique Saumur	Bordeaux
7:00 PM		Report	? 68'	Stadium: Matmut Atlantique

15 March 2025 22	US Avranches	3 – 2	Girondins	Avranches
7:00 PM	? 51', 53', 90+8' (pen.)	Report	Yambéré 75'; Bahassa 90+2'	Stadium: Stade René Fenouillère

21 March 2025 23	Girondins	0 – 1	Blois Football 41	Bordeaux
8:30 PM		Report	? 35'	Stadium: Matmut Atlantique

5 April 2025 24	Saint-Pryvé	1 – 2	Girondins	Saint-Pryvé-Saint-Mesmin
7:00 PM	? 7'		Carroll 43', 90'	Stadium: Le Grand Clos

12 April 2025 25	Girondins	1 – 0	Saint-Malo	Bordeaux
7:00 PM	Ikia Dimi 14'	Report		Stadium: Matmut Atlantique

19 April 2025 26	Stade Briochin	1 – 0	Girondins	Saint-Brieuc
7:30 PM	? 79'	Report		Stadium: Stade Fred-Aubert

26 April 2025 27	Girondins	1 – 0	La Roche	Bordeaux
7:00 PM	Beugre 2'	Report		Stadium: Matmut Atlantique

3 May 2025 28	Les Herbiers VF	2 – 0	Girondins	Les Herbiers
7:00 PM	? 14' ? 22'	Report		Stadium: Stade Massabielle

10 May 2025 29	Girondins	3 – 2	US Granville	Bordeaux
7:00 PM	Louveau 10'; Foll 49' (o.g.); Carroll 64'	Report	? 14' ? 56'	Stadium: Matmut Atlantique

17 May 2025 30	Saint-Colomban Locminé	2 – 0	Girondins	Locminé
7:00 PM	? 78', 90'	Report		Stadium: Stade du Pigeon Blanc

=== Coupe de France ===
29 September 2024 Round 4	FC Seudre Océan	0 – 5	Girondins	Puymoyen
15:00 CET (UTC+1:00)				Stadium: Stade Ligue Nouvelle Aquitaine

14 October 2024 Round 5	CMO Bassens	0 – 3	Girondins	Le Bouscat
20:30 CET (UTC+1:00)				Stadium: Stade Sainte Germaine

26 October 2024 Round 6	FC Cœur Médoc Atlantique	1 – 4	Girondins	Soulac-sur-Mer
19:00 CET (UTC+1:00)				Stadium: Stade Pierre Dartial

17 November 2024 Round 7	Bressuire	0 – 2	Girondins	Bressuire
		Report	Diaby 11'; Karim 74'	Stadium: Stade Alain Metayer

1 December 2024 Round 8	Girondins	2 – 0	Les Herbiers	Le Bouscat
	Merdji 19', 35'	Report		Stadium: Stade Sainte-Germaine

22 December 2024 Round of 64	Girondins	1 – 4	Rennes	Bordeaux
14:45 CET (UTC+1)	Bahassa 18'; Grillot (yellow card) 64'; Assogba (yellow card) 70'	Report	Truffert 29'; Hateboer (yellow card) 34'; James (yellow card) 53', (goal) 59'; Assignon 75'; Kalimuendo 79'	Stadium: Matmut Atlantique; Attendance: 19,877; Referee: Bastien Dechepy

== Statistics ==
=== Appearances and goals ===
Players with no appearances are not included on the list.

As of match played 17 May 2025

No.	Pos	Nat	Player	Total		Ch. National 2 - Group B		Coupe de France	
No.	Pos	Nat	Player	Apps	Goals	Apps	Goals	Apps	Goals
1	GK	(Mali) MLI	Diabaté	0	1	0	1	0	0
2	DF	(France) FRA	Fofana	0	1	0	1	0	0
4	DF	(Central African Republic) CAF	Yambéré	0	2	0	2	0	0
7	FW	(France) FRA	Bahassa	0	4	0	3	0	1
8	MF	(Ivory Coast) CIV	Thomas	0	1	0	1	0	0
9	FW	(England) ENG	Carroll	0	11	0	11	0	0
10	FW	(France) FRA	Merdji	0	10	0	8	0	2
12	MF	(France) FRA	Diaby	0	1	0	0	0	1
14	FW	(Ivory Coast) CIV	Beugre	0	2	0	2	0	0
22	FW	(France) FRA	Ikia Dimi	0	4	0	4	0	0
24	DF	(France) FRA	Louveau	0	1	0	1	0	0
26	MF	(France) FRA	Depussay	0	1	0	1	0	0
27	DF	(France) FRA	Ranem	0	2	0	2	0	0
	MF	(Morocco) MAR	Karim	0	1	0	0	0	1
Players sold, released or loaned out during the season:

== Transfers ==
Due to the bankruptcy issues and the forfeiture of professional status, the club would release all players under contract on 25 July 2024.

Following confirmation that the club would survive and would play in National 2, Bordeaux began recruiting players for the first team in order to be able to participate in the upcoming season. On 28 August 2024, the club announced via their website that they had recruited twenty-four players, four of which were retained from youth contracts at the club in the previous season. Former youth products Rio Mavuba and Paul Baysse would come out of retirement to offer their services to the team. Emeric Depussay was the only player who remained with the team after the administrative relegation.

=== Transfers in ===
Date	Position	Nationality	Name	From	Fee	Ref.
28 August 2024	MF	(France)	Rio Mavuba	Free Agent	Free	
28 August 2024	DF	(France)	Paul Baysse	Free Agent	Free	
28 August 2024	MF	(France)	Junah Zuccolotto	SO Châtellerault	Free	
28 August 2024	FW	(France)	Hamidou Yameogo	Stade Malherbe Caen	Free	
28 August 2024	FW	(Senegal)	Malick Seck	FC Libourne	Free	
28 August 2024	FW	(France)	Malhory Noc	Free Agent	Free	
28 August 2024	FW	(Senegal)	Pape Massar Djitte	Pau FC	Free	
28 August 2024	MF	(France)	Nolan Bonte	RC Lens	Free	
28 August 2024	DF	(France)	Omar Sané	FC Libourne	Free	
28 August 2024	DF	(France)	Sékou Fofana	C'Chartres Football	Free	
28 August 2024	GK	(France)	Over Mandanda	FC Libourne	Free	
28 August 2024	MF	(France)	N'Famady Diaby	Aviron Bayonnais FC	Free	
28 August 2024	DF	(France)	Nathanaël Bai	Sablé FC	Free	
28 August 2024	DF	(France)	Nassim Ranem	Blagnac FC	Free	
28 August 2024	MF	(Tunisia)	Issam Ben Khemis	Angoulême Charente FC	Free	
28 August 2024	FW	(France)	Jérémy Grain	Trélissac-Antonne Périgord FC	Free	
28 August 2024	DF	(France)	Nama Fofana	US Créteil-Lusitanos	Free	
28 August 2024	DF	(France)	Driss Trichard	USL Dunkerque	Free	
28 August 2024	FW	(France)	Yanis Merdji	US Concarneau	Free	
28 August 2024	GK	(France)	Lassana Diabaté	Valenciennes FC	Free	
28 August 2024	DF	(Senegal)	Djibril Diaw	(Ukraine) FC Rukh Lviv	Free	
29 August 2024	DF	(France)	Adrien Louveau	(Poland) ŁKS Łódź	Free	
5 September 2024	MF	(France)	Soufiane Bahassa	Bourges Foot 18	Free	
5 September 2024	MF	(France)	Younès Kaabouni	Free Agent	Free	
5 September 2024	DF	(Benin)	Youssouf Assogba	Amiens SC	Free	
5 September 2024	DF	(Central African Republic)	Cédric Yambéré	(Faroe Islands) Klaksvíkar Ítróttarfelag	Free	
12 September 2024	FW	(England)	Amadou Diallo	(England) Newcastle United FC	Free	
18 September 2024	FW	(England)	Andy Carroll	Amiens SC	Free	
2 October 2025	FW	(Uganda)	Travis Mutyaba	(Uganda) SC Villa	Free	
2 October 2025	MF	(Morocco)	Safouane Karim	(Netherlands) FC Volendam	Free	
25 October 2025	MF	(Ivory Coast)	Trazié Thomas	(Israel) Beitar Jerusalem FC	Free	
9 January 2025	FW	(Ivory Coast)	Etienne Beugre	(Slovenia) NK Maribor	Free	

=== Loans in ===
Date	Position	Nationality	Name	From	Date until	Ref.
14 January 2025	FW	(France)	Yvan Ikia Dimi	Amiens SC	30 June 2025	

=== Transfers out ===
Date	Position	Nationality	Name	To	Fee	Ref.
7 October 2024	DF	(France)	Paul Baysse	Retired	Resigned	
7 October 2024	MF	(France)	Rio Mavuba	Retired	Resigned	
7 January 2025	DF	(France)	Nassim Ranem	Free Agent	Resigned	
7 January 2025	FW	(Senegal)	Malick Seck	FC Albères Argelès	Free	
4 February 2025	FW	(France)	Malhory Noc	ÉFC Fréjus Saint-Raphaël	Free	
22 February 2025	MF	(Morocco)	Safouane Karim	(Netherlands) Roda JC Kerkrade	Free	
