= Openda =

Openda is a surname. Notable people with the surname include:

- Loïs Openda (born 2000), Belgian footballer
- Royce Openda (born 2002), Gabonese footballer
