= Andy Carroll =

English footballer (born 1989)

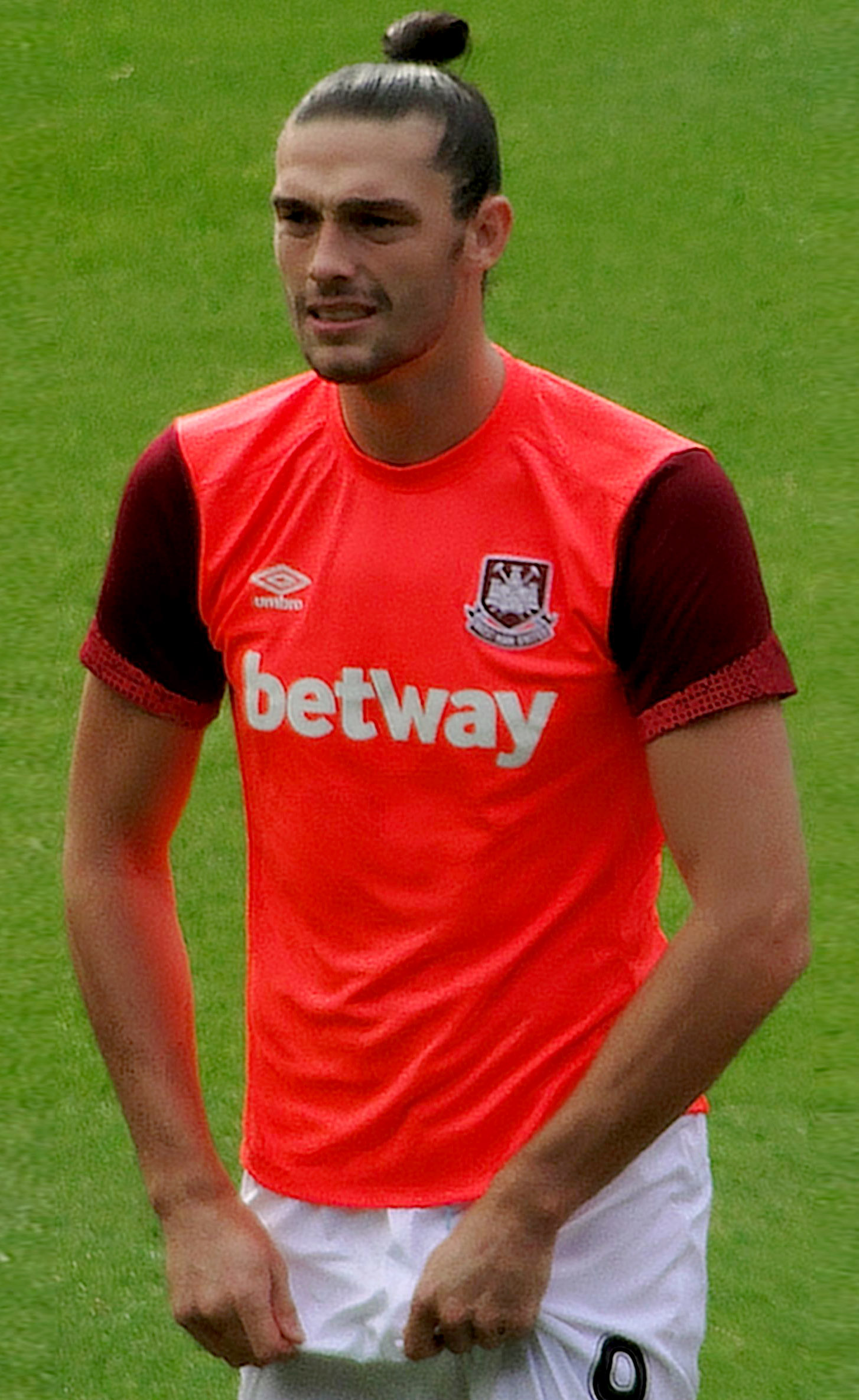
- Carroll training with West Ham United in 2015

Personal information
- Full name: Andrew Thomas Carroll
- Date of birth: 6 January 1989 (age 37)
- Place of birth: Gateshead, England
- Height: 6 ft 4 in (1.94 m)
- Position: Striker

Team information
- Current team: Dagenham & Redbridge
- Number: 9

Youth career
- –2006: Newcastle United

Senior career*
Years	Team	Apps	(Gls)
2006–2011	Newcastle United	80	(31)
2007–2008	→ Preston North End (loan)	11	(1)
2011–2013	Liverpool	44	(6)
2012–2013	→ West Ham United (loan)	24	(7)
2013–2019	West Ham United	102	(26)
2019–2021	Newcastle United	37	(1)
2021–2022	Reading	8	(2)
2022	West Bromwich Albion	15	(3)
2022–2023	Reading	32	(9)
2023–2024	Amiens	32	(4)
2024–2025	Bordeaux	21	(11)
2025–	Dagenham & Redbridge	18	(6)

International career
2007–2008	England U19	8	(5)
2009–2010	England U21	5	(3)
2010–2012	England	9	(2)

Managerial career
- 2026: Dagenham & Redbridge (caretaker)
- * Club domestic league appearances and goals as of 13:13, 15 September 2026 (UTC)

Andrew Thomas Carroll (born 6 January 1989) is an English professional player who plays as a striker for National League South club Dagenham & Redbridge, where he also serves as assistant manager.

Carroll began his professional career with Newcastle United in 2006, before spending a brief period on loan with Preston North End, during which time he scored his first league goal. He established himself as a regular in the Newcastle first team by 2008, and following Newcastle's relegation from the Premier League to the Championship in 2009, scored 17 goals in 39 appearances to help Newcastle finish first in the league, earning immediate promotion in the process. The following season he scored 11 goals in 19 appearances, before leaving for Liverpool on transfer deadline day in January 2011, signing for a fee of £35 million, at the time the record for a British footballer.

Carroll struggled for goals at Liverpool, moving on a season-long loan to West Ham United in 2012, made permanent a year later for a fee of £15 million. He spent six injury-impacted years at West Ham, and was released in 2019 at the end of his contract. Carroll then re-signed for Newcastle, spending two years at the club until being released at the end of his contract in 2021. He then moved to Reading on a short term deal leaving the club in August 2023. Carroll moved to France, playing for Amiens and Bordeaux.

He played nine matches for England between 2010 and 2012, scoring twice, including one goal at UEFA Euro 2012.

== Club career ==
=== Newcastle United ===
==== 2006–07 ====
Carroll, an occasional scorer in Newcastle United's reserve team, signed his first professional contract with the club in July 2006. He made his first-team debut on 2 November 2006 at the age of 17 years and 300 days in a 1–0 UEFA Cup win over Palermo, coming on as a late substitute for Nolberto Solano. In doing so, he became the youngest ever player to represent Newcastle.

He made his FA Cup debut on 17 January 2007, appearing as substitute for the last ten minutes in the 5–1 home defeat by Birmingham City. On 25 February 2007, Carroll made his Premier League debut for Newcastle, coming on as a substitute in the 87th minute in the 1–0 defeat by Wigan Athletic, almost scoring in the process; only a good save from Wigan goalkeeper John Filan prevented him from scoring his first Newcastle goal.

In 2007, he was the recipient of the Wor Jackie Milburn Trophy, awarded every year to the rising star of North-East football, chosen amongst current Newcastle players.

==== 2007–08 ====
On 29 July 2007, Carroll scored his first senior goal with a left-foot shot in a 2–0 win over Juventus in a friendly match. After the match, Carroll received praise from Italian goalkeeper Gianluigi Buffon, who tipped Carroll to have a big future.

On 14 August 2007, Carroll began a six-month loan with Preston North End, and made his debut for them in the League Cup against Morecambe on the same day. Carroll received his first red card of his professional career playing for Preston against Scunthorpe United on 18 September. He scored his first Championship goal, and his first English league goal, against Leicester City on 6 November.

==== 2008–09 ====
Carroll made his first appearance for Newcastle in the 2008–09 season on 20 October, coming on as a substitute for Shola Ameobi at home to Manchester City. Carroll scored his first competitive goal for Newcastle on his first ever home start with a header against West Ham United in a 2–2 draw on 10 January 2009. He signed a new three-and-a-half-year contract on 12 March 2009, in theory keeping him at Newcastle until 2012.

==== 2009–10 ====
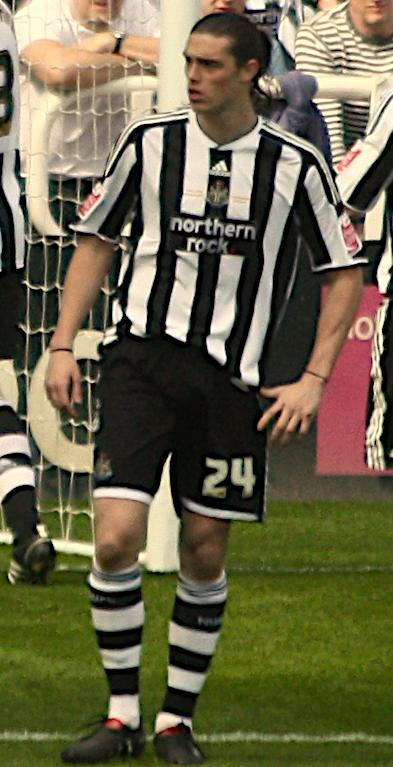
Carroll playing for Newcastle United in 2010

Following Newcastle's relegation, and the departures of first-team strikers, Michael Owen, Mark Viduka and Obafemi Martins, Carroll was paired with Shola Ameobi in attack for Newcastle at the start of the new season. His first league goal in the Championship came on 16 September 2009 against Blackpool with a header. By 2010, Carroll was playing almost every match, in a new strike partnership with Peter Løvenkrands. This partnership accounted for more than half of the club's goals in 2010. Carroll finished the season as Newcastle's top scorer, with 19 goals in all competitions, 17 in the league.

==== 2010–11 ====
Carroll was given squad number 9 for the 2010–11 season, a number with great significance for Newcastle United supporters, as it has been worn in the past for Newcastle by the likes of Jackie Milburn, Malcolm Macdonald and Alan Shearer. Carroll scored his first career hat-trick against Aston Villa in their 6–0 win in the Premier League on 22 August 2010. Carroll captained Newcastle for the first time on 3 October 2010 when he came on as a substitute for Kevin Nolan against Manchester City. In October 2010, Carroll signed a new five-year contract, on paper keeping him at the club until 2015. Carroll scored Newcastle's third in a 3–1 victory over Liverpool at St James' Park on 11 December 2010, with a low 25-yard drive.

=== Liverpool ===
==== 2010–11 ====
On 31 January 2011, Liverpool placed a bid of £30 million for Carroll, which was rejected. Newcastle then accepted a bid of £35 million and, following the agreement of personal terms and a medical, the transfer was completed shortly before the 11:00 pm deadline.

Carroll insisted he was forced out of Newcastle, but United said he had submitted a transfer request after they turned down Liverpool's £30 million bid. Liverpool confirmed that Carroll would wear the number 9 jersey previously worn by Fernando Torres, who left Anfield for Chelsea on the same evening for £50 million. The transfer made Carroll the eighth overall most expensive footballer at the time, and also the most expensive British footballer at the time. He also became the second most expensive footballer playing for a British club, after Torres. However, due to an injury he sustained while with Newcastle, it was announced that Carroll would have to wait some time before his Liverpool debut.

Carroll finally made his Liverpool debut as a substitute in the 3–1 win against Manchester United on 6 March 2011. On 10 March, he appeared in his first European match for Liverpool in a 1–0 loss at Braga in the UEFA Europa League, appearing as a substitute after half-time. In the return leg a week later, he made his first Liverpool start, although the match finished 0–0, leading to Liverpool going out of the competition losing 1–0 on aggregate. On 20 March, he made his first Premier League start for Liverpool at the Stadium of Light in a 2–0 victory against Sunderland. On 11 April, Carroll scored his first goals for Liverpool in a 3–0 victory against Manchester City at Anfield, scoring his first with a long-range strike and his second with a header.

==== 2011–12 ====
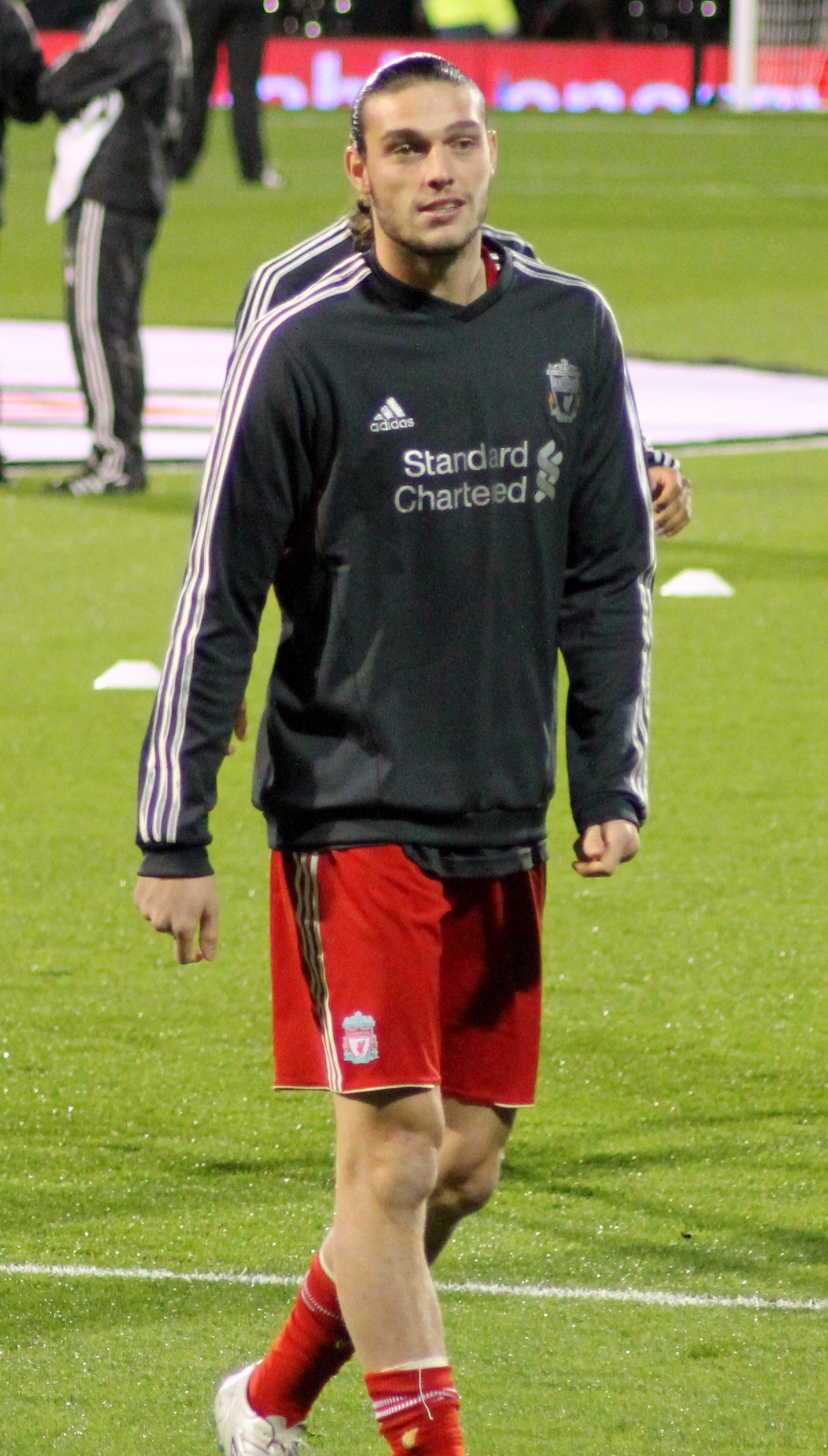
Carroll warming up for Liverpool in 2011

On 24 August 2011, he scored his first goal of the new season with a 20-yard drive against Exeter City to make the score 3–0 in the second round of the League Cup. On 1 October 2011, he scored his first league goal of the 2011–12 season during a 2–0 victory over Everton at Goodison Park. His third goal of the season came in a 2–0 win away at West Bromwich Albion. He scored his first goal of 2012 in a 5–1 third-round FA Cup victory against Oldham Athletic. He would go on to create the Dirk Kuyt goal that would secure victory in the 88th minute over Manchester United in the fourth round of the FA Cup on 28 January, before marking the first anniversary of his signing with Liverpool with his fifth goal of the season in a 3–0 victory away at Wolverhampton Wanderers on 31 January. He later scored, and set up teammate Luis Suárez, during Liverpool's 6–1 win against Brighton & Hove Albion in the fifth round of the FA Cup.

On 26 February, he won his first trophy with Liverpool as they won the League Cup, beating Cardiff City in the final. On 10 April, he headed an injury-time winner against Blackburn Rovers to end Liverpool's run of four matches without a win. Four days later, he headed in another late winner, this time in a 2–1 victory against Everton in the FA Cup semi-final at Wembley, to take Liverpool through to the final on his 50th appearance for Liverpool. Carroll described his match-winning goal as "the best feeling ever", with teammate Jamie Carragher saying the goal was "worth £35 million in itself" and that Carroll would "be remembered forever". He also scored in the final, which Liverpool lost 2–1 to Chelsea.

=== West Ham United ===
==== 2012–13 ====
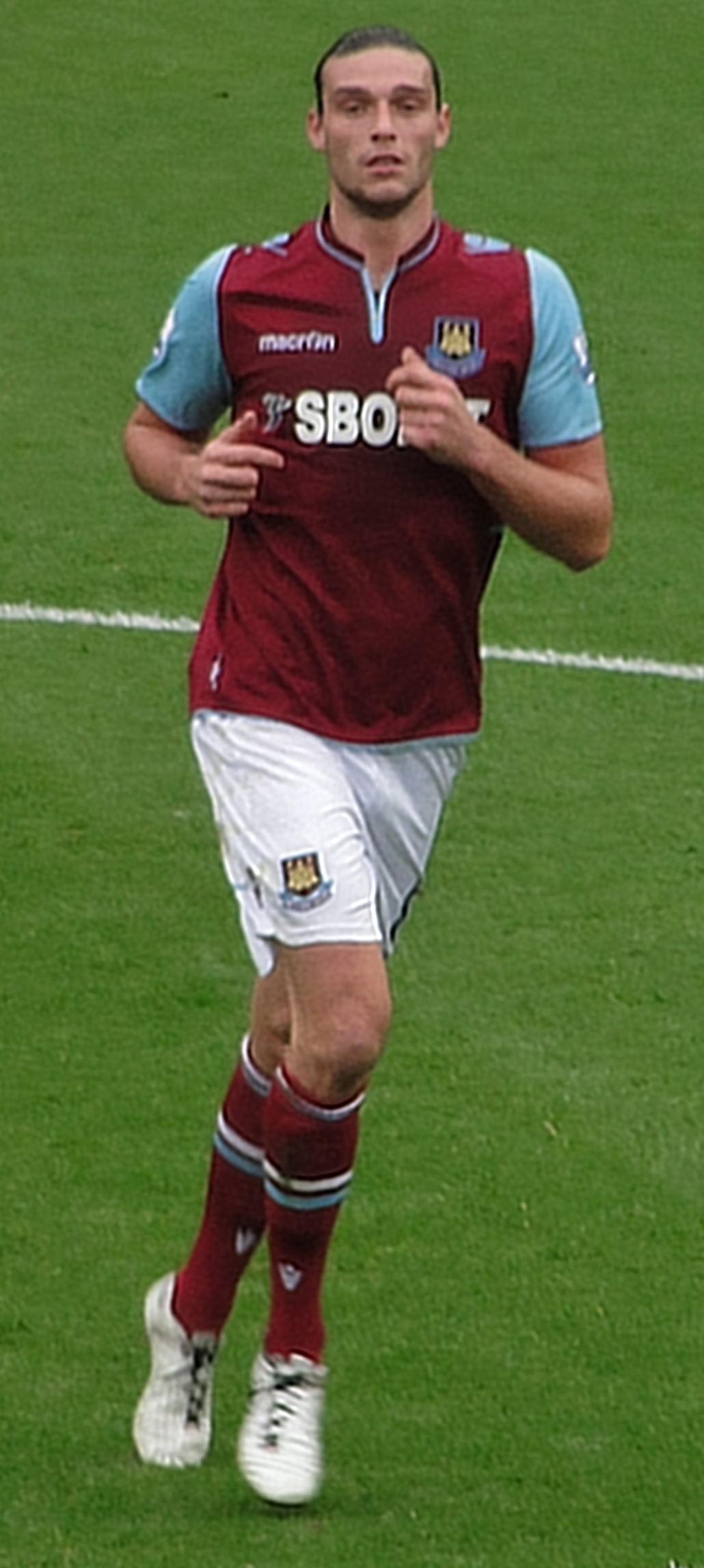
Carroll playing for West Ham United in 2012

On 30 August 2012, it was agreed that Carroll would spend the 2012–13 season on loan to fellow Premier League club West Ham United, who were newly promoted to the division at the time. Liverpool initially wanted a £17 million option for a permanent transfer written into the loan deal, but dropped the demand to facilitate the deal, and West Ham ultimately paid a £2 million loan arrangement fee and also all of Carroll's £80,000-a-week Liverpool wages.

Carroll made his debut on 1 September, setting-up two goals in a 3–0 home win against Fulham. He scored his first goal on 25 November 2012 in a 3–1 away defeat against Tottenham Hotspur. After making his first start since November due to injury, Carroll scored the only goal in a home win against Swansea City on 2 February 2013. Carroll ended the loan spell with seven goals in 24 appearances.

==== 2013–14 ====
On 21 May 2013, West Ham and Liverpool agreed a fee of around £15 million to make the loan move permanent, pending Carroll agreeing to the move, and then to personal terms. Carroll signed a six-year contract with West Ham on 19 June 2013 for a then club record transfer fee of £15 million.

Carroll started the 2013–14 season injured with a heel problem picked up in the final match of the previous season. He made his first appearance of the season on 12 January 2014, as a substitute in the 72nd minute of a 2–0 victory over Cardiff, assisting Mark Noble for West Ham's second goal. On 31 March, he was named man of the match by Sky Sports for his performance in a 2–1 win against Sunderland at the Stadium of Light in which he scored one and assisted the other of the Hammers' goals. Carroll ended the 2013–14 Premier League season with two goals from 18 appearances.

==== 2014–15 ====
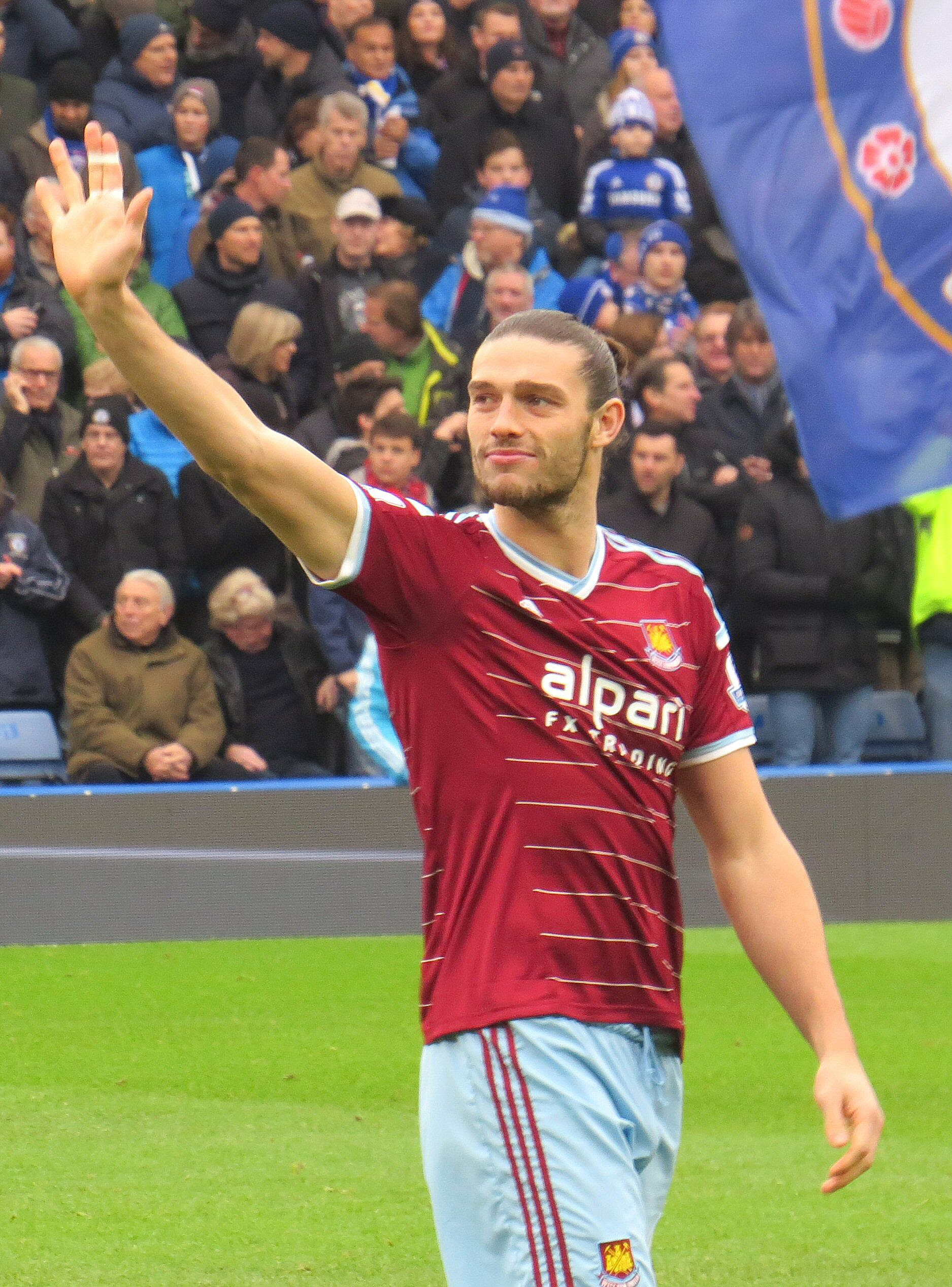
Carroll playing for West Ham United in 2014

During a pre-season tour of New Zealand, Carroll sustained an ankle ligament injury which prevented him from appearing during West Ham's first eleven Premier League matches. Carroll returned to the team on 8 November 2014, coming on as a substitute for Mark Noble in a 0–0 home draw with Aston Villa.

On 7 December 2014, he scored his first two goals of the season against Swansea in a 3–1 home win; these were also his first goals scored at Upton Park since March 2013. On 20 December, Carroll scored the 50th league goal of his career in West Ham's 2–0 defeat of Leicester. From December 2014 to January 2015, he went on a run of five goals in eight league appearances.

On 11 February 2015, Carroll was substituted in the second half of a 0–0 draw against Southampton with a tear in his medial ligament on the side of his knee. Two days later, West Ham's website announced Carroll was set to have surgery the following week and that he expected to miss the remainder of the 2014–15 season. He did not play again after February and made only 14 league appearances in the 2014–15 season, scoring five goals; three against Swansea City and one each against Hull City and Leicester.

==== 2015–16 ====
Carroll returned to the first team on 14 September 2015, making his first appearance of the season as an 88th-minute substitute for Victor Moses in a 2–0 home win against his former club, Newcastle.

On 24 October, Carroll scored his first goal in nine months, coming on as a substitute and heading in Aaron Cresswell's cross to defeat champions Chelsea 2–1 in a Premier League fixture at Upton Park. Following several goalless matches, Carroll suffered a groin injury while training for West Ham's 7 December match against Swansea, sidelining him for several weeks. He returned to action as a half-time substitute in a 2–1 win against Southampton. Carroll scored the winning goal via header after a shot from Michail Antonio had rebounded off of the crossbar. This marked Carroll's first goal since the match against Chelsea, and just his third of the year.

On 2 January 2016, Carroll started for West Ham against his former club Liverpool, in a 2–0 victory with Carroll scoring again from a header following a cross from Mark Noble. This was the first time Carroll had scored in consecutive matches in nearly 12 months, and was his first goal against Liverpool since leaving the club in 2013. On 9 April, Carroll scored his first hat-trick with West Ham, in a 3–3 draw against Arsenal. On 20 April, Carroll scored in his third consecutive Premier League match for the first time in his career as West Ham beat Watford 3–1 at the Boleyn Ground.

==== 2016–17 ====
Carroll played the full 90 minutes in West Ham's 2–1 defeat against Chelsea in the first match of the season, on 15 August. On 18 August, Carroll came on at the 63rd minute in a 1–1 draw against Astra Giurgiu in the first leg of the Europa League playoffs, and sustained a knee injury. While initial estimates put his recovery time at six weeks, it saw him sidelined for over three months.

On 3 December, he returned to action, scoring as a 73rd-minute substitute in a 1–5 home loss against Arsenal. On 14 January 2017, Carroll scored what he said was "the best goal I've scored" with a bicycle kick in a 3–0 win against Crystal Palace at London Stadium. The goal was named Goal of the Month for January by the Premier League on 10 February.

On 1 April, Carroll scored the 50th Premier League goal of his career in a 2–1 loss at Hull City, captaining West Ham for the first time.

==== 2017–18 ====
Carroll played 16 league matches, scoring three goals. He made a further two appearances in the League Cup, to finish the season on three goals in 18 games.

==== 2018–19 ====
Carroll played only 14 games in the 2018–19 season, scoring just one goal in the FA Cup, before being ruled out in April 2019 for the remainder of the season following ankle surgery. He was released by West Ham at the end of the 2018–19 season.

=== Return to Newcastle United ===
Carroll re-signed for Premier League club Newcastle United on 8 August 2019, signing a one-year contract. He made his return debut on 21 September as a substitute for Jetro Willems in the 82nd minute of a 0–0 draw at home to Brighton & Hove Albion. In June 2020, Carroll agreed a one-year extension to his contract. On 3 January 2021, Carroll scored his first goal for the Magpies since his return to the club in a 1–2 home league defeat by Leicester City. He left Newcastle in July 2021 after spending two seasons at the club.

=== Reading ===
On 15 November 2021, Reading announced the signing of Carroll on a short-term contract until mid-January 2022. He made his Reading debut on 20 November in a 1–1 draw with Nottingham Forest coming on as a 61st minute substitute for Liam Moore and playing a role in the build-up to their second-half equaliser from Scott Dann. He scored his first goal for the club on 27 November in a 3–2 win against Swansea City. Following a 2–1 away defeat to Middlesbrough on 15 January 2022, in which Carroll scored his second goal for Reading, his contract with the club ended.

=== West Bromwich Albion ===
On 28 January 2022, West Bromwich Albion announced the signing of Carroll on a short-term contract until the end of the season. He made his debut the following day in a 2–0 away defeat against Millwall. On 12 March 2022, Carroll scored his first goal for the club netting the equaliser in the 85th minute during a 2–2 home draw against Huddersfield Town.

On 30 April 2022, it was reported that Carroll would leave Albion at the end of the season.

=== Return to Reading ===
On 15 September 2022, Carroll returned to Reading, signing a four-month contract with the club, until the middle of January 2023 and taking the vacant number two squad number in the process. On 10 January 2023, Carroll signed a contract extension with the Royals, keeping him at the club until mid 2024. On 31 August 2023, Carroll left Reading after triggering a release clause in his contract.

=== Amiens ===
On 1 September 2023, Carroll joined Ligue 2 club Amiens. He made his debut on 3 September coming on as a substitute in the 66th minute, replacing Abdoul Tapsoba as Amiens won 4–1 against Guingamp, moving them to second in the league.

=== Bordeaux ===
On 18 September 2024, Carroll left Amiens to join Championnat National 2 club Bordeaux. He scored twice on his debut for the club in a 2–2 draw against Voltigeurs de Châteaubriant. He left the club after one season as he wanted to be "closer to his children".

=== Dagenham & Redbridge ===
In July 2025, Carroll signed for National League South club Dagenham & Redbridge on a three-year contract. He said of the move, "It doesn't matter the level, or anything, as long as I get on the pitch and play football, that's all that matters". Carroll was also announced as a minority shareholder in the club on the same day as the purchase of Dagenham & Redbridge by Qatari private investors.

On 18 March 2026, Carroll was confirmed as interim manager of the club following the sacking of Lee Bradbury.

== International career ==
=== England youth teams ===
On 11 September 2007, Carroll made his England under-19 debut against Belarus, scoring in the 4–0 victory. On 12 March 2009, Carroll was called up to the England under-20s for a match against Italy, but was withdrawn from the squad and replaced by Hal Robson-Kanu.

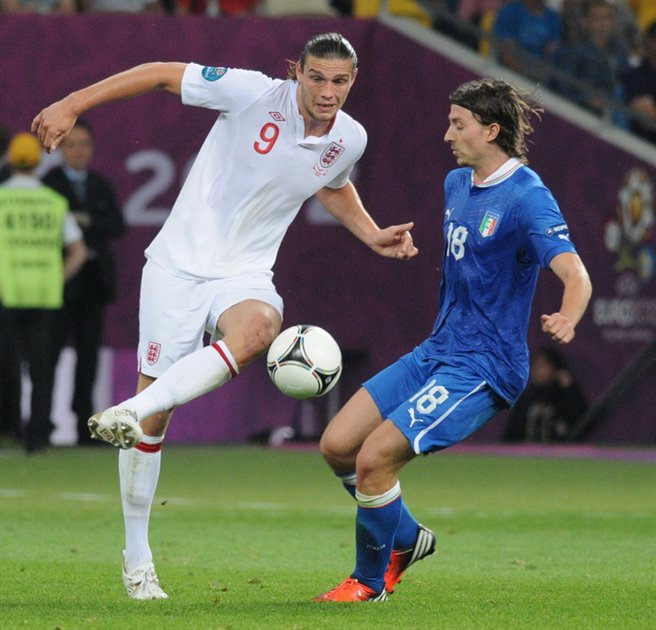
Carroll (left) playing for England at UEFA Euro 2012

Carroll received his first call up to the England under-21s on 5 August 2009. He made his debut on 11 August 2009 against the Netherlands, coming on as a second-half substitute. On his second cap with the under-21 team, on 9 October 2009 against Macedonia, he scored two goals and assisted another as England won 6–3.

=== England senior team ===
Carroll's performances for Newcastle United earned him a call-up to the England squad for the friendly against France on 17 November 2010. He passed a late fitness test to start the match. He scored his first senior goal for England, a low left-foot drive into the bottom corner, on 29 March 2011 in a friendly against Ghana which ended 1–1. On 15 May 2012, Carroll was included in the squad for UEFA Euro 2012. He opened the scoring for England with a powerful header in their second group match against Sweden, which England went on to win 3–2.

== Style of play ==
Early in his career, Carroll was compared to Newcastle's record goalscorer Alan Shearer, Ivory Coast striker Didier Drogba and Italy forward Christian Vieri. He was referred to as a classic centre forward, owing to his strength, powerful shot and excellent heading ability. Former Newcastle manager Kevin Keegan stated in 2010 that Carroll "is probably in the top three headers of a ball I have ever seen in football". After Newcastle's 2–0 defeat at home to Blackpool in September 2010, Blackpool manager Ian Holloway described Carroll as "the best striker in the Premier League". A strong and very physical centre-forward, Carroll is distinguished by his powerful aerial abilities, with former West Ham manager Slaven Bilić suggesting in 2016 that he was "the best in the world at heading a football".

== Personal life ==
Born in Gateshead, Tyne and Wear, Carroll attended Brighton Avenue Primary School and Joseph Swan School. He is a model for clothing retail company H&M and has fronted a campaign led by fashion designer Alexander Wang. In November 2014, Carroll became engaged to reality TV star Billi Mucklow. The couple live in Essex. Their son was born in 2015. He has two children from a previous relationship. In November 2017, Mucklow and Carroll had a second child. The couple announced that they were divorcing in 2024.

In November 2016, Carroll was approached by two men on motorcycles while driving near his home in Brentwood, Essex. Armed with a handgun, they attempted to steal his £22,000 watch but failed. Carroll was then chased in his car for about 20 minutes as he drove back to West Ham's training ground in Rush Green to get help from security staff. In September 2017, 22-year-old Jack O'Brien was found guilty of the attempted robbery. He was sentenced to six years in prison for the offence.

In May 2019, Carroll was listed as the 14th-wealthiest sports person aged 30 or under in the Sunday Times Rich List, his personal wealth having increased to £19 million.

On 27 April 2025, Carroll was arrested for breaching a non-molestation order. He had been scheduled to appear in court to enter a plea on 30 December 2025, but the hearing was postponed to 4 February 2026. The charges were brought due to alleged repeated phone calls to Mucklow in March 2025, which would have been a breach of the order given by the justice centre in Chelmsford. In February, Carroll requested his case be heard at Chelmsford Crown Court, at which point his hearing was scheduled for 4 March. His trial has been scheduled for 18 January 2027. He has pleaded not guilty.

Carroll published his autobiography, Owning It, in September 2026. He stated in the book that he had been sexually assaulted by a man in 2021. Carroll said he awoke to the man attempting to perform oral sex on him. The perpetrator, who was a friend of an ex-partner, was convicted and jailed for three years. Carroll described the experiences of giving evidence in court as "humiliating and embarrassing and absolutely horrendous".

== Discipline ==
Carroll has been involved in several off-the-pitch incidents in his career. On 14 September 2008, he was arrested by police in Newcastle, and later accepted a police caution. On 7 December 2009, he was arrested in the aftermath of a nightclub fight, again in Newcastle, accused of smashing glass in a man's face. He was charged with assault and in October 2010 he pleaded guilty to common assault and was fined £1,000. He was also ordered to pay £2,500 compensation.

While on international duty with the England U-19s, Carroll and teammates Scott Sinclair and Ryan Bertrand were sent home from the squad after breaking a curfew on 14 October 2007 during preparation for a match against Romania U-19s. During training in March 2010, Carroll was allegedly involved in an altercation with teammate Steven Taylor, which left Taylor with a broken jaw. Carroll reportedly suffered a broken hand in the incident and was subsequently photographed at a concert with bandages to both hands. Newcastle manager Chris Hughton, club representatives and both players then declined to comment any further on the incident and no charges were pressed.

On 18 October 2010, Carroll was charged with assault in an incident with his ex-girlfriend. Claiming self-defence, and having given a local hotel as his address, Carroll was granted bail on the condition that he resided with Newcastle's then captain Kevin Nolan until the case resumed in January. The charges were later dropped due to lack of evidence. Two days following his bail, Carroll's car was set on fire while parked on Nolan's driveway, with the club captain's garage door also being daubed with obscenities.

Following England's 1–1 draw with Ghana on 29 March 2011, England manager Fabio Capello told Carroll to curtail his drinking habits. Liverpool manager Kenny Dalglish responded by saying, "Well he's never bought me a drink. I've been with him at Boyzone concerts and he's still never bought me a drink!"

In an interview in April 2012, Carroll acknowledged that he had gained a reputation for drinking and socialising during his time at Newcastle, but that since joining Liverpool in January 2011 he had "settled down" and changed his lifestyle.

Carroll's time at West Ham United was blighted by many injuries. His former manager Sam Allardyce said this was partly caused by Carroll failing to look after himself and not doing the required rehabilitation work to keep himself fit.

== Career statistics ==
=== Club ===
As of match played 12 September 2026

Appearances and goals by club, season and competition
Club	Season	League			National cup (Note: Includes FA Cup, Coupe de France)		League cup (Note: Includes Football League/EFL Cup)		Europe		Total	
Club	Season	Division	Apps	Goals	Apps	Goals	Apps	Goals	Apps	Goals	Apps	Goals
Newcastle United	2006–07	Premier League	4	0	1	0	0	0	2 (Note: Appearances in UEFA Cup)	0	7	0
Newcastle United	2007–08	Premier League	4	0	2	0	—		—		6	0
Newcastle United	2008–09	Premier League	14	3	2	0	0	0	—		16	3
Newcastle United	2009–10	Championship	39	17	3	2	0	0	—		42	19
Newcastle United	2010–11	Premier League	19	11	0	0	1	0	—		20	11
Newcastle United	Total		80	31	8	2	1	0	2	0	91	33
Preston North End (loan)	2007–08	Championship	11	1	—		1	0	—		12	1
Liverpool	2010–11	Premier League	7	2	—		—		2 (Note: Appearances in UEFA Europa League)	0	9	2
Liverpool	2011–12	Premier League	35	4	6	4	6	1	—		47	9
Liverpool	2012–13	Premier League	2	0	—		—		0	0	2	0
Liverpool	Total		44	6	6	4	6	1	2	0	58	11
West Ham United (loan)	2012–13	Premier League	24	7	0	0	0	0	—		24	7
West Ham United	2013–14	Premier League	15	2	0	0	1	0	—		16	2
West Ham United	2014–15	Premier League	14	5	2	0	0	0	—		16	5
West Ham United	2015–16	Premier League	27	9	4	0	1	0	0	0	32	9
West Ham United	2016–17	Premier League	18	7	1	0	0	0	3	0	22	7
West Ham United	2017–18	Premier League	16	3	0	0	2	0	—		18	3
West Ham United	2018–19	Premier League	12	0	2	1	0	0	—		14	1
West Ham United	Total		126	33	9	1	4	0	3	0	142	34
Newcastle United	2019–20	Premier League	19	0	2	0	0	0	—		21	0
Newcastle United	2020–21	Premier League	18	1	1	0	3	0	—		22	1
Newcastle United	Total		37	1	3	0	3	0	0	0	43	1
Reading	2021–22	Championship	8	2	0	0	—		—		8	2
West Bromwich Albion	2021–22	Championship	15	3	—		—		—		15	3
Reading	2022–23	Championship	30	9	2	0	—		—		32	9
Reading	2023–24	League One	2	0	—		0	0	—		2	0
Reading	Total		32	9	2	0	0	0	0	0	34	9
Amiens	2023–24	Ligue 2	28	4	3	0	—		—		31	4
Amiens	2024–25	Ligue 2	4	0	—		—		—		4	0
Amiens	Total		32	4	3	0	0	0	0	0	35	4
Bordeaux	2024–25	National 2	21	11	2	0	—		—		23	11
Dagenham & Redbridge	2025–26	National League South	12	6	1	0	—		—		13	6
Dagenham & Redbridge	2026–27	National League South	6	0	0	0	—		—		6	0
Career total			423	106	34	7	15	1	7	0	479	116

=== Managerial statistics ===
As of match played 25 April 2026

Managerial record by team and tenure
Team	From	To	Record					Ref.
Team	From	To	P	W	D	L	Win %	Ref.
Dagenham & Redbridge (caretaker)	18 March 2026	25 April 2026	7	2	2	3	28.57	
Total			7	2	2	3	28.57	

=== International ===
Appearances and goals by national team and year
National team	Year	Apps	Goals
England	2010	1	0
England	2011	2	1
England	2012	6	1
Total		9	2

Scores and results list England's goal tally first, score column indicates score after each Carroll goal.

List of international goals scored by Andy Carroll
No.	Date	Venue	Opponent	Score	Result	Competition	Ref.
1	29 March 2011	Wembley Stadium, London, England	Ghana	1–0	1–1	Friendly	
2	15 June 2012	Olimpiyskiy National Sports Complex, Kyiv, Ukraine	Sweden	1–0	3–2	UEFA Euro 2012	

== Honours ==
Newcastle United

- Football League Championship: 2009–10

Liverpool

- Football League Cup: 2011–12
- FA Cup runner-up: 2011–12

Individual

- Jackie Milburn Trophy: 2007
- PFA Team of the Year: 2009–10 Championship
- Premier League Goal of the Month: January 2017
