= Yvan Ikia Dimi =

French footballer (born 2004)

Personal information
- Date of birth: 26 September 2004 (age 22)
- Place of birth: Villeneuve-Saint-Georges, France
- Height: 1.75 m (5 ft 9 in)
- Position: Forward

Team information
- Current team: Górnik Zabrze
- Number: 7

Youth career
- 2010–2011: FCC Villeneuvois
- 2012–2013: Ascoux SF
- 2013–2018: Malesherbes
- 2018–2019: US Chauny
- 2019–2023: Amiens

Senior career*
Years	Team	Apps	(Gls)
2021–2023	Amiens B	24	(4)
2023–2026	Amiens	31	(5)
2025	→ Bordeaux (loan)	14	(4)
2026–	Górnik Zabrze	23	(2)

International career^{‡}
2022	France U18	5	(2)
2023	France U20	2	(0)
2026–	Congo	4	(0)
- * Club domestic league appearances and goals as of 12:21, 9 November 2026 (UTC) ‡ National team caps and goals as of 23:34, 17 November 2026 (UTC)

Yvan Ikia Dimi (born 26 September 2004) is a professional footballer who plays as a forward for Ekstraklasa club Górnik Zabrze. Born in France, he plays for the Congo national team.

== Club career ==
On 7 October 2023, Ikia Dimi made his professional debut for Amiens in a 4–1 Ligue 2 defeat at home to Angers.

On 14 January 2025, Ikia Dimi was loaned by Bordeaux.

On 11 February 2026, Ikia Dimi joined Polish club Górnik Zabrze, signing a contract until June 2029.

== International career ==
Ikia Dimi made his debut for the France under-18s in 2022, and was a part of the team that won the Mediterranean Games. In November 2023, he was called up to the under-20s for the first time.

On 15 September 2026, Ikia Dimi received his first call-up to the Congo national team, for the 2027 AFCON qualification matches against Namibia and Cameroon. He made his debut as a substitute in a 1–0 loss to Namibia on 24 September.

== Personal life ==
Born in France, Ikia Dimi is of Republic of the Congo descent.

== Career statistics ==
=== International ===
As of match played 17 November 2026

Appearances and goals by national team and year
National team	Year	Apps	Goals
Congo
Congo	2026	4	0
Total		4	0

== Honours ==
Górnik Zabrze

- Polish Cup: 2025–26

France U18

- Mediterranean Games: 2022
