= Abou Ba =

French footballer (born 1998)

Personal information
- Full name: Abou-Malal Ba
- Date of birth: 29 July 1998 (age 28)
- Place of birth: Saint-Dié-des-Vosges, France
- Height: 1.83 m (6 ft 0 in)
- Position: Midfielder

Team information
- Current team: Orléans
- Number: 8

Youth career
- 2004–2009: SR Saint-Dié
- 2009–2011: US Raon-l'Étape
- 2011–2017: Nancy

Senior career*
Years	Team	Apps	(Gls)
2015–2019	Nancy B	41	(3)
2017–2019	Nancy	42	(2)
2019–2023	Nantes	0	(0)
2019–2020	→ Aris (loan)	18	(0)
2020–2021	→ Cosenza (loan)	17	(0)
2021–2022	→ Alessandria (loan)	26	(1)
2022–2023	→ Seraing (loan)	9	(0)
2023–2024	Villefranche	4	(0)
2025	Villefranche	15	(0)
2025–2026	Bordeaux	25	(2)
2026–	Orléans	3	(0)

International career^{‡}
2016	France U18	2	(0)
2018	France U20	1	(0)
- * Club domestic league appearances and goals as of 5 September 2026 ‡ National team caps and goals as of 22:23, 2 July 2019 (UTC)

Abou-Malal Ba (born 29 July 1998) is a French professional footballer who plays as a midfielder for Ligue 3 club Orléans.

== Club career ==
Ba made his professional debut with AS Nancy in a 0–0 Ligue 2 tie with Nîmes Olympique on 14 August 2017. He signed his first professional contract with Nancy on 20 September 2017.

On 5 September 2020, he joined Italian club Cosenza on a season-long loan.

On 7 August 2021, he moved on loan to Alessandria.

On 1 September 2022, Ba switched to Seraing in Belgium on a new loan.

On 13 January 2025, Ba returned to Villefranche after not playing in the first half of the 2024–25 season.

== Personal life ==
Born in France, Ba is of Senegalese descent.

== Career statistics ==
=== Club ===
As of 18 October 2019

Appearances and goals by club, season and competition
Club	Season	League			Cup		Continental		Other		Total	
Club	Season	Division	Apps	Goals	Apps	Goals	Apps	Goals	Apps	Goals	Apps	Goals
Nancy	2017–18	Ligue 2	25	2	1	0	—		1	0	27	2
Nancy	2018–19	Ligue 2	17	0	0	0	—		1	0	18	0
Nancy	Total		42	2	1	0	0	0	2	0	45	2
Aris (loan)	2019–20	Super League Greece	18	0	3	0	—		—		21	0
Career total			60	2	4	0	0	0	2	0	66	2
