= Pape Massar Djitte =

Senegalese footballer

Personal information
- Date of birth: 8 February 2003 (age 23)
- Place of birth: Meckhe, Senegal
- Height: 1.75 m (5 ft 9 in)
- Position: Forward

Youth career
- 2016–2022: CNEPS Excellence

Senior career*
Years	Team	Apps	(Gls)
2022–2024	Pau B	24	(4)
2023–2024	Pau	2	(0)
2024	→ Mâcon (loan)	0	(0)
2024–2025	Bordeaux	2	(0)
2024–2025	Bordeaux B	20	(1)
- * Club domestic league appearances and goals as of 17 May 2025

Pape Massar Djitte (born 8 February 2003) is a Senegalese professional footballer who plays as a forward.

== Career ==
Pape Massar Djitte joined CNEPS Excellence in his native Senegal at the age of 13, becoming a part of their academy.

Djitte secured a transfer to Pau in 2022. While the exact transfer fee remains undisclosed, his move to Pau FC marked an important phase in his promising career. He began his Pau career with a 2–0 Ligue 2 loss against Caen on 7 August 2023.

On 15 January 2024, Djitte was loaned to Championnat National 3 club Mâcon.

In August 2024, Djitte left Pau FC to join Girondins de Bordeaux, who had been administratively relegated by the DNCG to National 2, the fourth tier of French football. Bordeaux is coached for the 2024-25 season by Bruno Irles and Dado Pršo, the duo who previously led Pau FC to Ligue 2.

== Personal life ==
Pape Massar Djitte was a finalist of the COSAFA Cup in 2021.
