= Ludéric Etonde =

French footballer (born 2000)

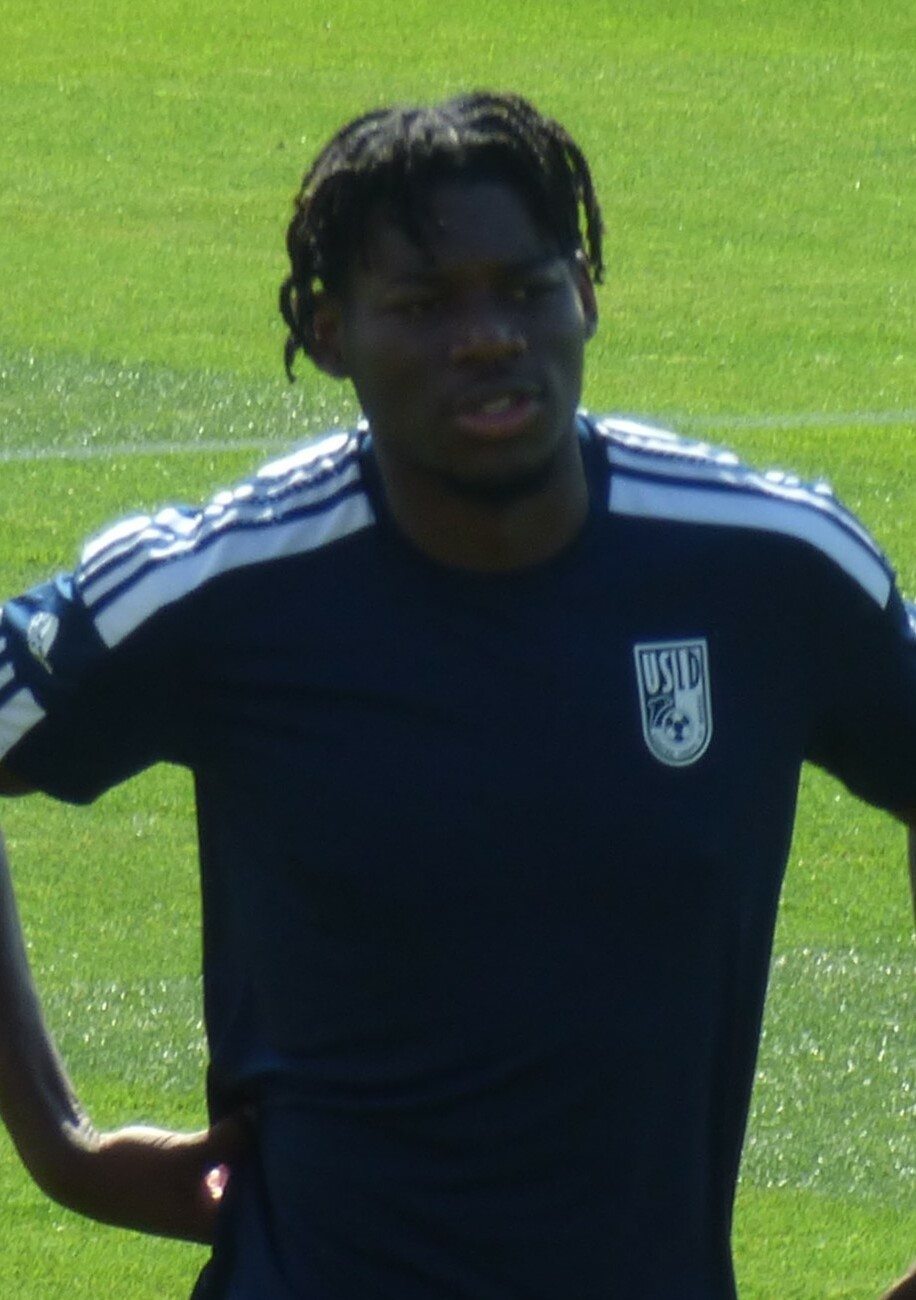
- Etonde in 2023

Personal information
- Date of birth: 30 August 2000 (age 26)
- Place of birth: Juvisy-sur-Orge, France
- Height: 1.90 m (6 ft 3 in)
- Position: Striker

Team information
- Current team: Boulogne
- Number: 13

Youth career
- 2014–2017: Paris FC
- 2017–2019: Metz

Senior career*
Years	Team	Apps	(Gls)
2019–2022	Laval II	18	(11)
2020–2021	Laval	14	(1)
2022–2023	Paris 13 Atletico	17	(3)
2023–2024	Dunkerque	13	(1)
2023–2024	→ Stade Briochin (loan)	16	(4)
2024–2025	Les Herbiers	18	(6)
2025–2026	Bordeaux	26	(10)
2026–	Boulogne	1	(0)
- * Club domestic league appearances and goals as of 4 September 2026

Ludéric Etonde (born 30 August 2000) is a French professional footballer who plays as a striker for Ligue 2 club Boulogne.

== Career ==
Etonde is a youth product of Paris FC and Metz, before moving to Laval in 2019. He began his senior career with their reserves, and made 14 appearances for their senior team but was hampered by injuries. On 5 July 2022, he moved to Paris 13 Atletico where he scored 3 goals in 17 games in half a season. On 31 January 2023, he transferred to Dunkerque in the Championnat National. In his first season with them, he helped them earn promotion into the Ligue 2.

== Personal life ==
Born in France, Etonde is of Cameroonian descent. He is the brother of the footballers Romaric and Emeric Etonde, cousin of the footballers Paul-Georges Ntep, Pierre Ekwah, and the rugby player Charles-Edouard Ekwah Elimby.
