= Ruben Droehnlé =

French footballer (born 1998)

Personal information
- Date of birth: 12 July 1998 (age 28)
- Place of birth: Strasbourg, France
- Height: 1.83 m (6 ft 0 in)
- Position: Centre back

Team information
- Current team: Bordeaux
- Number: 17

Youth career
- 2003–2006: Strasbourg
- 2006–2018: Lille

Senior career*
Years	Team	Apps	(Gls)
2015–2020	Lille B	75	(1)
2018–2020	Lille	0	(0)
2018	→ Orléans (loan)	1	(0)
2018–2019	→ Orléans B (loan)	5	(1)
2020–2021	Teplice	11	(0)
2021–2024	Virton	41	(2)
2024–2025	Seraing	37	(1)
2025–	Bordeaux	11	(0)

International career
2013–2014	France U16	6	(0)
2017	France U19	2	(0)
- * Club domestic league appearances and goals as of 4 December 2025

Ruben Droehnlé (born 11 July 1998) is a French professional footballer who plays as a centre back for Championnat National 1 club Bordeaux.

== Professional career ==
A youth product of Lille OSC, on 30 July 2018 Droehnlé was loaned to Orléans for the 2018–19 season. Droehnlé made his professional debut in a 5–1 Ligue 2 loss to FC Metz on 3 August 2018.
He returned to Lille from Orléans in January 2019.
