= Emeric Depussay =

French footballer (born 2001)

Personal information
- Date of birth: 27 August 2001 (age 25)
- Place of birth: Pessac, France
- Height: 1.78 m (5 ft 10 in)
- Position: Defensive midfielder

Youth career
- 2007–2014: FCE Mérignac Arlac
- 2014–2020: Bordeaux

Senior career*
Years	Team	Apps	(Gls)
2019–2024	Bordeaux B	63	(4)
2022–2025	Bordeaux	37	(1)
- * Club domestic league appearances and goals as of 18:05, 27 May 2025 (UTC)

Emeric Depussay (born 27 August 2001) is a French professional footballer who plays as a defensive midfielder.

== Career ==
On 4 June 2020, Depussay signed his first professional contract with Bordeaux, a deal lasting until 30 June 2023. He made his professional debut for the club in a 3–0 Coupe de France loss to Brest on 2 January 2022.
