= Yanis Merdji =

French footballer (born 1993)

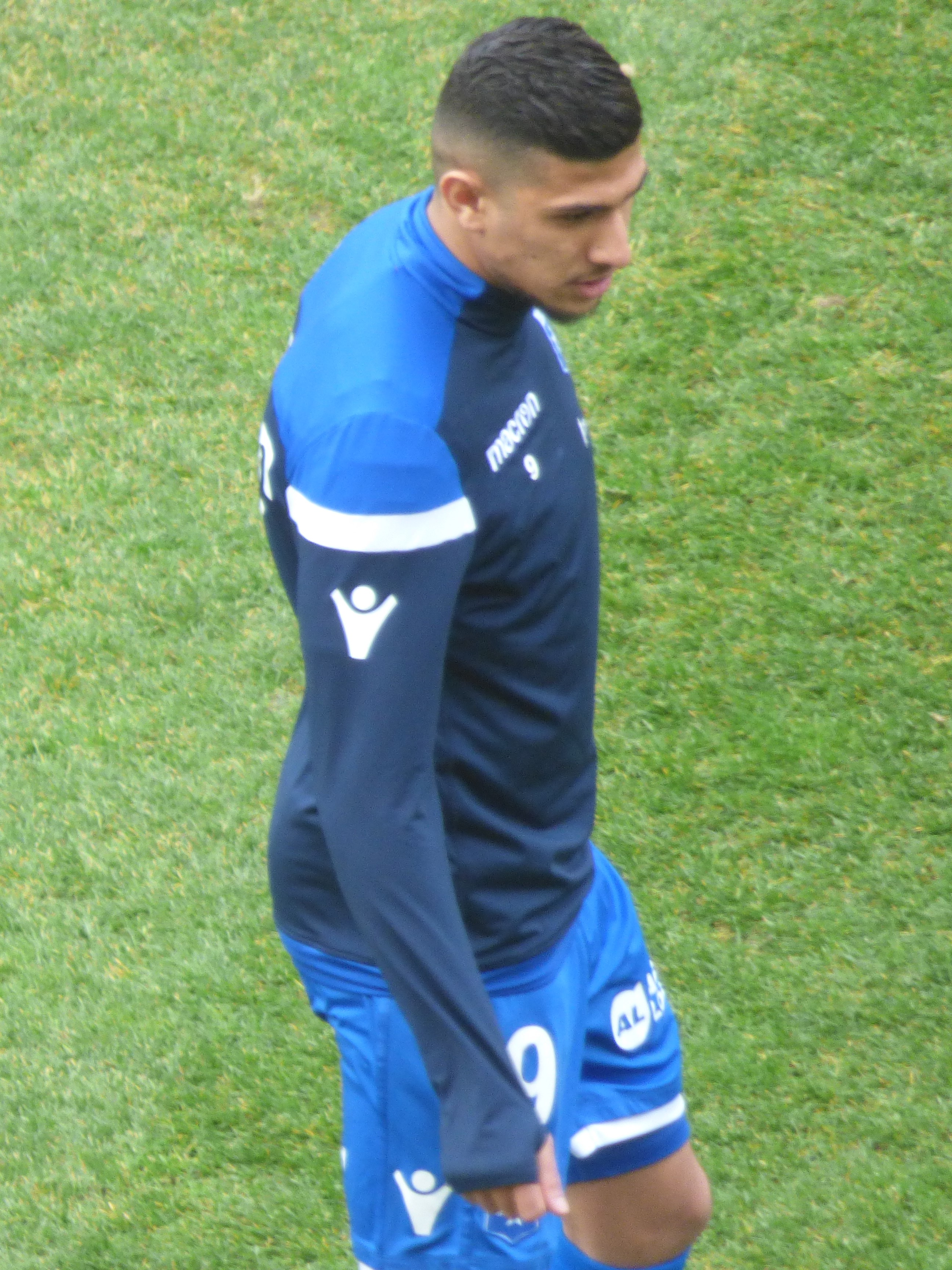
- Merdji in 2019

Personal information
- Date of birth: 29 October 1993 (age 33)
- Place of birth: Roanne, France
- Height: 1.74 m (5 ft 9 in)
- Position: Forward

Team information
- Current team: Foggia
- Number: 29

Senior career*
Years	Team	Apps	(Gls)
2012–2014	Andrézieux	8	(0)
2014–2015	Loire Nord		
2015–2016	Domtac		
2016–2017	Limonest	12	(10)
2017–2018	Bourg-en-Bresse	52	(15)
2018–2020	Auxerre	29	(7)
2020	→ Le Mans (loan)	7	(0)
2020–2021	Châteauroux	18	(2)
2021–2023	Niort	58	(4)
2023–2024	Concarneau	15	(3)
2024–2026	Bordeaux	27	(8)
2026–	Foggia	1	(0)
- * Club domestic league appearances and goals as of 24 August 2026

Yanis Merdji (born 29 October 1993) is a French professional footballer who plays as a forward for Serie C Group C club Foggia in Italy.

He has previously represented Andrézieux, Bourg-Péronnas, Auxerre, Le Mans and Châteauroux.

== Personal life ==
Merdji holds French and Algerian nationalities.

== Career statistics ==
As of matches played 1 February 2022.

Appearances and goals by club, season and competition
Club	Season	League			Coupe de France		Coupe de la Ligue		Other		Total	
Club	Season	Division	Apps	Goals	Apps	Goals	Apps	Goals	Apps	Goals	Apps	Goals
Andrézieux	2012–13	CFA2	1	0	0	0	—		—		1	0
Andrézieux	2013–14	CFA2	7	0	0	0	—		—		7	0
Andrézieux	Total		8	0	0	0	—		—		8	0
Limonest	2016–17	CFA2	12	10	0	0	—		—		12	10
Bourg-Péronnas	2016–17	Ligue 2	17	6	0	0	0	0	—		17	6
Bourg-Péronnas	2017–18	Ligue 2	35	9	5	1	1	0	2 (Note: Matches played in the 2017–18 Ligue 2 relegation playoffs)	0	43	10
Bourg-Péronnas	Total		52	15	5	1	1	0	2	0	60	16
Auxerre	2018–19	Ligue 2	15	3	0	0	2	0	—		17	3
Auxerre	2019–20	Ligue 2	14	4	2	1	1	0	—		17	5
Auxerre	Total		29	7	2	1	3	0	—		34	8
Le Mans (loan)	2019–20	Ligue 2	7	0	0	0	0	0	—		7	0
Châteauroux	2020–21	Ligue 2	18	2	1	0	— (Note: The Coupe de la Ligue was indefinitely suspended following the 2019–20 edition)		—		19	2
Niort	2021–22	Ligue 2	19	3	— (Note: Niort excluded from the 2021–22 Coupe de France)		—		—		19	3
Career total			145	37	8	2	4	0	2	0	159	39
