= Lassana Diabaté =

French footballer (born 2003)

Personal information
- Date of birth: 21 August 2003 (age 23)
- Place of birth: Créteil, France
- Height: 1.83 m (6 ft 0 in)
- Position: Goalkeeper

Team information
- Current team: Bordeaux
- Number: 1

Youth career
- –2018: US Créteil
- 2018–2022: Valenciennes

Senior career*
Years	Team	Apps	(Gls)
2022–2024	Valenciennes	15	(0)
2024–	Bordeaux	30	(1)
- * Club domestic league appearances and goals as of 31 August 2024

Lassana Diabaté (born 21 August 2003) is a professional footballer who plays as a goalkeeper for Championnat National 1 club Bordeaux. Born in France, he represents the Mali national team.

== Club career ==
=== Valenciennes ===
In 2018, Diabaté left US Créteil to join Valenciennes. He made 19 appearances on both seasons with the first team.

=== Bordeaux ===
Diabaté signed for Championnat National 2 side Girondins de Bordeaux on a free transfer, being part of the 11 players that joined the club as a part of their rebuild before the 2024–25 season. He scored his first goal on his debut, which was an equaliser on Bordeaux's opening game against Stade Poitevin.

== International career ==
On 13 October 2023, Diabaté was first called up to the Mali national team for a match against Uganda since several players within the squad had visa problems traveling abroad.

== Career statistics ==
As of match played 31 August 2024

Appearances and goals by club, season and competition
Club	Season	League			Coupe de France		Other		Total	
Club	Season	Division	Apps	Goals	Apps	Goals	Apps	Goals	Apps	Goals
Valenciennes	2022–23	Ligue 2	8	0	—	—	—	—	8	0
Valenciennes	2023–24	Ligue 2	7	0	4	0	—	—	11	0
Bordeaux	2024–25	Championnat National 2	1	1	—	—	—	—	1	1
