= Royce Openda =

Gabonese footballer (born 2002)

Personal information
- Full name: Royce Drax Openda Owaga
- Date of birth: 21 April 2002 (age 24)
- Place of birth: Libreville, Gabon
- Height: 1.64 m (5 ft 5 in)
- Position: Winger

Team information
- Current team: Pau
- Number: 14

Senior career*
Years	Team	Apps	(Gls)
–2021	AS Bouenguidi		
2022	FC Château-Gontier		
2023–2024	Lorient B	33	(3)
2023–2024	Lorient	1	(0)
2024–2025	Chambly Oise	10	(3)
2025–2026	Bordeaux	27	(14)
2026–	Pau	0	(0)

International career^{‡}
2025–	Gabon	4	(0)
- * Club domestic league appearances and goals as of 16 May 2026 ‡ National team caps and goals as of 23:03, 31 December 2025 (UTC)

Royce Drax Openda Owaga (born 21 April 2002) is a Gabonese footballer who plays as a winger for French Ligue 2 club Pau and the Gabon national team.

== Early life ==
Openda was born in 2002 in Gabon. He is a native of Port-Gentil, Gabon.

== Career ==
Openda started his career with Gabonese side AS Bouenguidi. He played in the CAF Champions League while playing for the club. In 2023, he signed for French Ligue 1 side FC Lorient.

== International career ==
Openda was called up to the Gabon national team for a set of 2026 FIFA World Cup qualification matches in November 2025.

== Style of play ==
Openda mainly operates as a striker. He is known for his speed.

== Career statistics ==
=== Club ===
As of match played 13 December 2025

Appearances and goals by club, season and competition
Club	Season	League			Cup		Continental		Total	
Club	Season	Division	Apps	Goals	Apps	Goals	Apps	Goals	Apps	Goals
AS Bouenguidi	2021–22	Gabon Championnat National D1	—		—		2 (Note: Appearances in CAF Champions League)	0	2	0
Lorient B	2023–24	CFA 2	12	1	—		—		12	1
Lorient B	2024–25	CFA 2	21	2	—		—		21	2
Lorient B	Total		33	3	—		—		33	3
Lorient	2023–24	Ligue 1	1	0	0	0	—		1	0
Bordeaux	2025–26	Championnat National 2	11	5	3	1	—		14	6
Career total			44	8	3	1	2	0	49	9

=== International ===
As of match played 31 December 2025

Appearances and goals by national team and year
National team	Year	Apps	Goals
Gabon	2025	4	0
Total		4	0
