= Driss Trichard =

French footballer (born 1995)

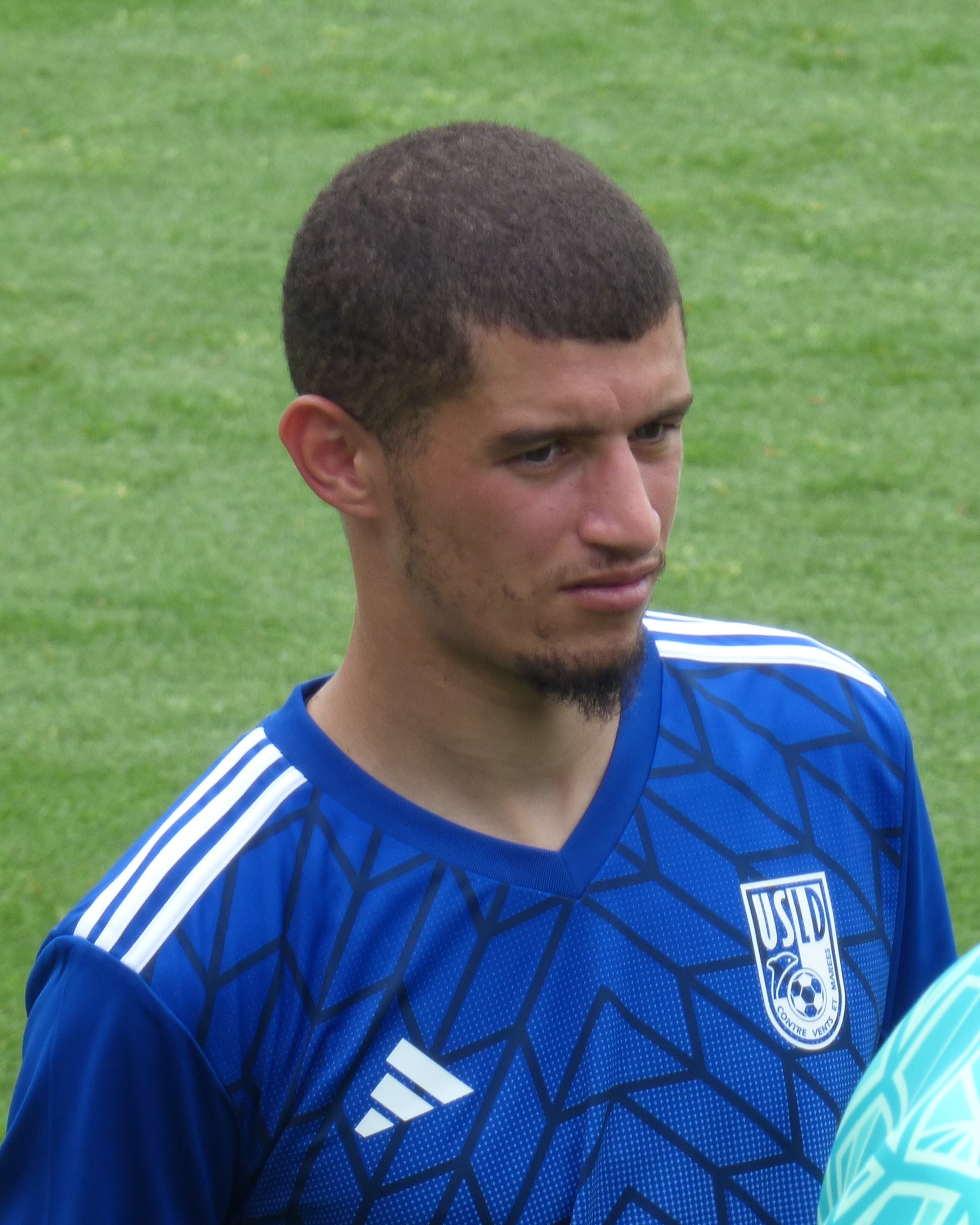
- Trichard in 2023

Personal information
- Date of birth: 27 March 1995 (age 31)
- Place of birth: Aubervilliers, France
- Height: 1.76 m (5 ft 9 in)
- Position: Midfielder

Team information
- Current team: Bordeaux
- Number: 28

Youth career
- 2002–2004: CS Pantin
- 2004–2008: AS Bondy
- 2008–2012: JA Drancy
- 2012–2014: Toulouse

Senior career*
Years	Team	Apps	(Gls)
2014–2015	Toulouse	1	(0)
2014–2015	Toulouse B	29	(5)
2015–2016	Nîmes B	7	(2)
2016–2017	Le Havre B	24	(0)
2017–2018	Épinal	22	(0)
2018–2019	Bordeaux B	24	(1)
2019	Bordeaux	1	(0)
2019–2021	Clermont	14	(0)
2021–2024	Dunkerque	67	(0)
2024–	Bordeaux	35	(1)

International career^{‡}
2013	France U19	2	(1)
- * Club domestic league appearances and goals as of 4 December 2025 ‡ National team caps and goals as of 12 February 2018

Driss Trichard (born 27 March 1995) is a French professional footballer who plays as a midfielder for Régional 1 club Bordeaux.

== Career ==
Trichard made his professional debut for Toulouse on 8 March 2014 in a 3–2 home win over Stade de Reims.

On 17 August 2021, Trichard signed a two-year contract with Dunkerque.

== Personal life ==
Born in France, Trichard is of Algerian descent.

== Career statistics ==
=== Club ===
As of match played 7 December 2024

Appearances and goals by club, season and competition
Club	Season	League			Coupe de France		Coupe de la Ligue		Other		Total	
Club	Season	Division	Apps	Goals	Apps	Goals	Apps	Goals	Apps	Goals	Apps	Goals
Toulouse	2013-14	Ligue 1	1	0	0	0	1	0	—		2	0
Toulouse B	2013–14	CFA 2	17	4	—		—		—		17	4
Toulouse B	2014–15	CFA 2	12	1	—		—		—		12	1
Toulouse B	Total		29	5	—		—		—		29	5
Nîmes B	2015-16	CFA 2	7	2	—		—		—		7	2
Le Havre B	2016-17	CFA	24	0	—		—		—		24	0
Épinal	2017-18	National 2	22	0	4	0	—		—		26	0
Bordeaux B	2018-19	National 2	24	1	—		—		—		24	1
Bordeaux	2018-19	Ligue 1	1	0	0	0	0	0	0	0	1	0
Clermont	2019-20	Ligue 2	1	0	1	0	0	0	—		2	0
Clermont	2020-21	Ligue 2	13	0	1	0	—		—		14	0
Clermont	Total		14	0	2	0	0	0	—		16	0
Clermont B	2019-20	National 3	8	0	—		—		—		8	0
Clermont B	2020-21	National 3	2	0	—		—		—		2	0
Clermont B	Total		10	0	—		—		—		10	0
Dunkerque	2021-22	Ligue 2	31	0	0	0	—		—		31	0
Dunkerque	2022-23	National	25	0	1	0	—		—		26	0
Dunkerque	2023-24	Ligue 2	11	0	1	0	—		—		12	0
Dunkerque	Total		67	0	2	0	—		—		69	0
Bordeaux	2024-25	National 2	11	0	1	0	—		—		12	0
Career total			210	8	9	0	1	0	0	0	220	8
