= 2020–21 FC Metz season =

FC Metz
2020–21 season
- President: Bernard Serin
- Head coach: Vincent Hognon (until 12 October); Frédéric Antonetti (from 12 October)
- Stadium: Stade Saint-Symphorien
- Ligue 1: 10th
- Coupe de France: Round of 16
- Top goalscorer: League: Ibrahima Niane (6); All: Ibrahima Niane; Vagner (6 each)
- Biggest win: Valenciennes 0–4 Metz; Dijon 1–5 Metz
- Biggest defeat: Monaco 4–0 Metz
Home colours	Away colours	Third colours
- All statistics correct as of 23 May 2021.

The 2020–21 season was FC Metz's 89th season in existence and the club's second consecutive season in the top flight of French football. In addition to the domestic league, Metz participated in this season's edition of the Coupe de France. The season covered the period from 1 July 2020 to 30 June 2021.

== Players ==
=== First-team squad ===
As of 10 February 2021.

Note: Flags indicate national team as defined under FIFA eligibility rules; some limited exceptions apply. Players may hold more than one non-FIFA nationality.

No.	Pos.	Nation	Player
2	DF	TUN	Dylan Bronn
3	DF	FRA	Matthieu Udol
4	MF	FRA	Kévin N'Doram
5	MF	CIV	Victorien Angban
6	MF	MLI	Mamadou Fofana
7	FW	SEN	Ibrahima Niane
8	MF	MLI	Boubacar Traoré
9	FW	FRA	Thierry Ambrose
10	MF	ALG	Farid Boulaya
11	MF	SEN	Opa Nguette
12	MF	FRA	Warren Tchimbembé
13	FW	SEN	Lamine Gueye
14	MF	FRA	Vincent Pajot
15	MF	SEN	Pape Matar Sarr

No.	Pos.	Nation	Player
16	GK	ALG	Alexandre Oukidja
17	DF	FRA	Thomas Delaine
18	DF	FRA	Fabien Centonze
19	MF	CIV	Habib Maïga
20	DF	GHA	Ernest Boahene
21	DF	GHA	John Boye (captain)
22	MF	FRA	Youssef Maziz
23	DF	MLI	Boubakar Kouyaté
24	FW	BEL	Aaron Leya Iseka (on loan from Toulouse)
26	FW	MTN	Pape Ndiaga Yade
27	FW	CPV	Vagner Gonçalves
28	DF	FRA	Manuel Cabit
29	DF	FRA	Lenny Lacroix
30	GK	FRA	Marc-Aurèle Caillard

=== Out on loan ===
Note: Flags indicate national team as defined under FIFA eligibility rules; some limited exceptions apply. Players may hold more than one non-FIFA nationality.

No.	Pos.	Nation	Player
—	GK	FRA	Guillaume Dietsch (on loan to Seraing)
—	DF	FRA	Rayan Djedje (on loan to Seraing)
—	DF	FRA	Yann Godart (on loan to Seraing)
—	DF	SEN	Ababacar Lô (on loan to Seraing)
—	MF	BEL	Sami Lahssaini (on loan to Seraing)

No.	Pos.	Nation	Player
—	MF	SEN	Cheikh Sabaly (on loan to Pau FC)
—	MF	GAM	Ablie Jallow (on loan to Seraing)
—	FW	FRA	Georges Mikautadze (on loan to Seraing)
—	FW	SEN	Amadou Dia N'Diaye (on loan to Seraing)

== Transfers ==
In:

No.	Pos.	Nation	Player
4	MF	FRA	Kévin N'Doram (from Monaco, previously on loan)
9	FW	FRA	Thierry Ambrose (from (England) Manchester City, previously on loan)
12	MF	FRA	Warren Tchimbembé (from Troyes)
13	FW	SEN	Lamine Gueye (from (Senegal) Génération Foot, previously on loan at Pau)
14	MF	FRA	Vincent Pajot (from Angers, previously on loan)
23	DF	MLI	Boubakar Kouyaté (from Troyes)
24	FW	BEL	Aaron Leya Iseka (on loan from Toulouse)
27	FW	CPV	Vagner (from Saint-Étienne, previously on loan at Nancy)
30	GK	FRA	Marc-Aurèle Caillard (from Guingamp)

Out:

No.	Pos.	Nation	Player
10	MF	FRA	Marvin Gakpa (to Paris)
20	FW	SEN	Habib Diallo (to Strasbourg)
22	MF	BEL	Sami Lahssaini (on loan to (Belgium) Seraing)
24	MF	FRA	Renaud Cohade (free agent)
25	MF	MLI	Adama Traoré (loan return to Monaco)
30	GK	FRA	Guillaume Dietsch (on loan to (Belgium) Seraing)
—	FW	SEN	Cheikh Sabaly (loan extension to Pau)
—	MF	GAM	Ablie Jallow (on loan to (Belgium) Seraing, previously on loan at Ajaccio)
—	MF	FRA	Raouf Mroivili (free agent, previously on loan at (Belgium) Seraing)
—	DF	LUX	Laurent Jans (to (Belgium) Standard Liège, previously on loan at (Germany) Paderborn)
—	MF	LUX	Vincent Thill (to (Portugal) Nacional, previously on loan at Orléans)
—	MF	HAI	Leverton Pierre (to Dunkerque, previously on loan)
—	MF	FRA	Gauthier Hein (to Auxerre, previously on loan at Valenciennes)
—	MF	ARG	Gerónimo Poblete (to (Chile) La Serena, previously on loan at (Argentina) San Lorenzo)

== Pre-season and friendlies ==
Win Draw Loss Fixtures

17 July 2020 Friendly	Metz	4–1	RFC Seraing	Metz, France
17:00 CEST (UTC+2)	Niane 8'; Yade 28'; Pajot 40'; Nguette 75'	Report	Mikautadze 65'	Stadium: Centre d’Entraînement de Frescaty

24 July 2020 Friendly	Metz	3–0	Charleroi	Metz, France
16:00 CEST (UTC+2)	Ambrose 53'; Boulaya 87'; Gueye 113'	Report		Stadium: Stade Saint-Symphorien

28 July 2020 Friendly	Gent	3–0	Metz	Ghent, Belgium
17:00 CEST (UTC+2)	Yaremchuk 13', 21'; Plastun 64'	Report		Stadium: Ghelamco Arena

1 August 2020 Friendly	Metz	1–0	KV Mechelen	Metz, France
10:30 CEST (UTC+2)	Boulaya 29'	Report		Stadium: Stade Saint-Symphorien

7 August 2020 Friendly	Dijon	1–2	Metz	Dijon, France
10:30 CEST (UTC+2)	Scheidler 105'	Report	Nguette 15'; Yade 78'	Stadium: Stade Gaston Gérard
Note: Match was played in three 45-minute parts.

15 August 2020 Friendly	Strasbourg	2–3	Metz	Molsheim, France
17:00 CEST (UTC+2)	Saadi 58'; Besic 87'	Report	Niane 21', 35'; Boulaya 40'; Pajot (red card) 44'	Stadium: Stadium de Molsheim

15 August 2020 Friendly	Strasbourg	Cancelled	Metz	Colmar, France
18:00 CEST (UTC+2)				Stadium: Colmar Stadium

22 August 2020 Friendly	Metz	1–1	Montpellier	Besançon, France
17:00 CEST (UTC+2)	Bronn (yellow card) 25'; Angban (yellow card) 52'; Boulaya 65'		Laborde 41'	Stadium: Stade Léo Lagrange; Referee: Mathieu Vernice

4 September 2020 Friendly	Metz	Cancelled	1. FC Kaiserslautern	Metz, France
15:00 CEST (UTC+2)

== Competitions ==
=== Overview ===
Competition	First match	Last match	Starting round	Final position	Record							
Competition	First match	Last match	Starting round	Final position	Pld	W	D	L	GF	GA	GD	Win %
Ligue 1	30 August 2020	23 May 2021	Matchday 1	10th	38	12	11	15	44	48	−4	31.58
Coupe de France	10 February 2021	6 April 2021	Round of 64	Round of 16	3	2	1	0	6	1	+5	66.67
Total					41	14	12	15	50	49	+1	34.15

Last updated: 23 May 2021
Source: Soccerway

=== Ligue 1 ===
==== League table ====
Pos	Team	Pld	W	D	L	GF	GA	GD	Pts
8	Montpellier	38	14	12	12	60	62	−2	54
9	Nice	38	15	7	16	50	53	−3	52
10	Metz	38	12	11	15	44	48	−4	47
11	Saint-Étienne	38	12	10	16	42	54	−12	46
12	Bordeaux	38	13	6	19	42	56	−14	45

Source: Ligue 1
Rules for classification: 1) Points; 2) Goal difference; 3) Goals scored; 4) Head-to-head goal difference; 5) Fairplay ranking.

==== Results summary ====
Overall								Home						Away					
Pld	W	D	L	GF	GA	GD	Pts	W	D	L	GF	GA	GD	W	D	L	GF	GA	GD
38	12	11	15	44	48	−4	47	5	5	9	19	26	−7	7	6	6	25	22	+3

Last updated: 23 May 2021.
Source: Ligue 1

==== Results by round ====
Round	1	2	3	4	5	6	7	8	9	10	11	12	13	14	15	16	17	18	19	20	21	22	23	24	25	26	27	28	29	30	31	32	33	34	35	36	37	38
Ground	A	H	A	H	A	H	A	H	A	H	A	H	H	A	A	H	A	H	H	A	H	A	H	A	H	A	A	H	A	H	A	H	A	H	A	H	A	H
Result	L	L	L	W	D	W	D	W	W	D	D	L	L	D	W	W	L	D	D	W	W	W	D	L	L	W	W	L	D	L	L	L	D	L	W	L	L	D
Position	12	17	18	17	17	15	14	10	7	10	10	12	13	13	12	10	10	11	12	9	8	6	6	7	7	6	5	6	7	9	9	10	9	10	9	10	10	10

Source: Ligue 1
A = Away; H = Home; W = Win; D = Draw; L = Loss

==== Matches ====
The league fixtures were announced on 9 July 2020.

30 August 2020 2	Metz	0–1	Monaco	Metz
15:00 CEST (UTC+2)		Report	Aguilar (yellow card) 19'; Badiashile 22'; Fofana (yellow card) 24' (yellow-red card) 47'; Martins (yellow card) 42'; Tchouaméni (yellow card) 49'	Stadium: Stade Saint-Symphorien; Referee: Jérémy Stinat

13 September 2020 3	Lille	1–0	Metz	Villeneuve-d'Ascq
13:00 CEST (UTC+2)	Pied (yellow card) 31'; Bradarić (yellow card) 57'; André (yellow card) 80'; Çelik (yellow card) 84'; Luiz Araújo 88'	Report	Maïga (yellow card) 20'; Bronn (yellow card) 36'; Pajot (yellow card) 43'; Centonze (yellow card) 75'	Stadium: Stade Pierre-Mauroy; Referee: Jérémie Pignard

16 September 2020 1	Paris Saint-Germain	1–0	Metz	Paris
21:00 CEST (UTC+2)	Diallo (yellow card) 1' (yellow-red card) 65'; Draxler (yellow card) 56', (goal) 90+3'	Report	Maïga (yellow card) 46'; Centonze (yellow card) 61'	Stadium: Parc des Princes; Referee: Mikael Lesage
Note: Match originally scheduled for 23 August, but postponed due to Paris Saint-Germain's participation in the knockout phase of the UEFA Champions League.

20 September 2020 4	Metz	2–1	Reims	Metz
15:00 CEST (UTC+2)	Niane 18', 88'; Boulaya (yellow card) 43'	Report	Abdelhamid (yellow card) 17'; Cassamá (yellow card) 27'; Dia 43' (pen.); Konan (yellow card) 48'; Munetsi (red card) 50'; Cafaro (yellow card) 53'	Stadium: Stade Saint-Symphorien; Referee: Johan Hamel

26 September 2020 5	Marseille	1–1	Metz	Marseille
21:00 CEST (UTC+2)	Sanson 90+5'	Report	Maïga (yellow card) 24'; Angban (yellow card) 56'; Niane 71'	Stadium: Stade Vélodrome; Referee: Eric Wattellier

4 October 2020 6	Metz	3–1	Lorient	Metz
15:00 CEST (UTC+2)	Angban (yellow card) 40'; Niane 44' (pen.), 59', 64'	Report	Hamel 36'; Abergel (yellow card) 52'; Wissa (yellow card) 86'	Stadium: Stade Saint-Symphorien; Referee: Jérôme Miguelgorry

18 October 2020 7	Angers	1–1	Metz	Angers
15:00 CEST (UTC+2)	Doumbia (yellow card) 14'; Thomas (yellow card) 36'; Mangani 38' (pen.); Traoré (yellow card) 73'; Fulgini (yellow card) 86'	Report	Udol (yellow card) 37'; Nguette 39'; Pajot (yellow card) 84'	Stadium: Stade Raymond Kopa; Referee: Aurélien Petit

25 October 2020 8	Metz	2–0	Saint-Étienne	Metz
15:00 CET (UTC+1)	Boulaya 5'; Angban (yellow card) 32'; Maïga (yellow card) 73'; Sissoko 78' (o.g.); Pajot (yellow card) 82'	Report	Retsos (yellow card) 23'; Bouanga (yellow card) 31'; Neyou (yellow card) 72'	Stadium: Stade Saint-Symphorien; Attendance: 5,000; Referee: Karim Abed

1 November 2020 9	Nîmes	0–1	Metz	Nîmes
15:00 CET (UTC+1)	Roux (yellow card) 40'; Fomba (yellow card) 45+3'; Martinez (yellow card) 65'	Report	Gueye 15', (yellow card) 57'; Udol (red card) 44'; Centonze (yellow card) 90+3'	Stadium: Stade des Costières; Attendance: 0 Referee: Amaury Delerue

8 November 2020 10	Metz	1–1	Dijon	Metz
15:00 CET (UTC+1)	Nguette (penalty missed) 7'; Yade 21'; Vagner (yellow card) 64'; Delaine (yellow card) 90+1'	Report	Baldé 13'; Chouiar (penalty missed) 30', (yellow card) 90'	Stadium: Stade Saint-Symphorien; Attendance: 0 Referee: Willy Delajod

22 November 2020 11	Nantes	1–1	Metz	Nantes
13:00 CET (UTC+1)	Kolo 29'; Abeid (yellow card) 41'; Fábio (yellow card) 45+4'	Report	Leya Iseka 45+4' (pen.); Fofana (yellow card) 71'; Oukidja (yellow card) 85'; Boye (yellow card) 87'	Stadium: Stade de la Beaujoire; Attendance: 0 Referee: Benoît Millot

29 November 2020 12	Metz	0–2	Brest	Metz
15:00 CET (UTC+1)	Oukidja (yellow card) 32'; Centonze (yellow card) 66'	Report	Cardona 12', 64', (yellow card) 54'	Stadium: Stade Saint-Symphorien; Attendance: 0 Referee: Hakim Ben El Hadj

6 December 2020 13	Metz	1–3	Lyon	Metz
21:00 CET (UTC+1)	Boulaya (penalty missed) 7', 76'; Sarr (yellow card) 29'; Boye (red card) 87'	Report	Depay 17'; Toko Ekambi 47', 60'; Cherki (red card) 90+3'	Stadium: Stade Saint-Symphorien; Attendance: 0 Referee: Karim Abed

13 December 2020 14	Strasbourg	2–2	Metz	Strasbourg
15:00 CET (UTC+1)	Simakan (yellow card) 36', (goal) 66'; Thomasson 78', (yellow card) 84'; Aholou (yellow card) 90+4'	Report	Bronn 35' (pen.), (penalty missed) 51'; Nguette 70'; Delaine (yellow card) 73'; Maïga (yellow card) 80'; Kouyaté (yellow card) 90'; Angban (yellow card) 90'	Stadium: Stade de la Meinau; Attendance: 0 Referee: François Letexier

16 December 2020 15	Montpellier	0–2	Metz	Montpellier
19:00 CET (UTC+1)	Mollet (yellow card) 39'; Mavididi (yellow card) 64'; Laborde (yellow card) 76'	Report	Leya Iseka (yellow card) 7', (goal) 50' (pen.); Maïga (yellow card) 30', (goal) 90'; Delaine (yellow card) 38'	Stadium: Stade de la Mosson; Attendance: 0 Referee: Jérémie Pignard

19 December 2020 16	Metz	2–0	Lens	Metz
17:00 CET (UTC+1)	Nguette 30'; Boulaya (yellow card) 49', (goal) 90+5'	Report	Sotoca (yellow card) 90+3'	Stadium: Stade Saint-Symphorien; Attendance: 0 Referee: Amaury Delerue

23 December 2020 17	Rennes	1–0	Metz	Rennes
19:00 CET (UTC+1)	Bourigeaud (yellow card) 42'; Grenier 52'	Report	Yade (yellow card) 26'	Stadium: Roazhon Park; Attendance: 0 Referee: Florent Batta

6 January 2021 18	Metz	0–0	Bordeaux	Metz
19:00 CET (UTC+1)	Leya Iseka (yellow card) 39'	Report	Adli (yellow card) 20'; Pablo (yellow card) 26'	Stadium: Stade Saint-Symphorien; Attendance: 0 Referee: Antony Gautier

9 January 2021 19	Metz	1–1	Nice	Metz
21:00 CET (UTC+1)	Kouyaté (yellow card) 17'; Maziz (yellow card) 36'; Boye 79'	Report	Gouiri 18' (pen.); Nsoki (yellow card) 67'; Boudaoui (yellow card) 76'	Stadium: Stade Saint-Symphorien; Attendance: 0 Referee: Johan Hamel

17 January 2021 20	Lyon	0–1	Metz	Décines-Charpieu
21:00 CET (UTC+1)	Dubois (yellow card) 27'	Report	Boye (yellow card) 27'; Kouyaté (yellow card) 86'; Leya Iseka 90', (yellow card) 90'	Stadium: Parc Olympique Lyonnais; Attendance: 0 Referee: Stéphanie Frappart

24 January 2021 21	Metz	2–0	Nantes	Metz
15:00 CET (UTC+1)	Vagner (yellow card) 29'; Leya Iseka 35'; Sarr (yellow card) 85'; Boulaya (yellow card) 89', (goal) 90+4'	Report	Coco (yellow card) 66'	Stadium: Stade Saint-Symphorien; Attendance: 0 Referee: Jérôme Miguelgorry

31 January 2021 22	Brest	2–4	Metz	Brest
15:00 CET (UTC+1)	Perraud (yellow card) 31'; Honorat 33'; Cardona 48'	Report	Boulaya 36', (yellow card) 90+2'; Sarr 73'; Yade 81', (yellow card) 89'; Vagner 87' (pen.); Fofana (yellow card) 90+2'	Stadium: Stade Francis-Le Blé; Attendance: 0 Referee: Benoît Millot

3 February 2021 23	Metz	1–1	Montpellier	Metz
19:00 CET (UTC+1)	Boye (yellow card) 9'; Leya Iseka (yellow card) 33'; Sarr 47'; Maïga (yellow card) 74'; Centonze (yellow card) 76'; Bronn (yellow card) 82'; Ambrose (yellow card) 90+1'	Report	Congré (yellow card) 58'; Laborde 70'	Stadium: Stade Saint-Symphorien; Attendance: 0 Referee: Bastien Dechepy

7 February 2021 24	Saint-Étienne	1–0	Metz	Saint-Étienne
15:00 CET (UTC+1)	Boye 14' (o.g.); Hamouma (yellow card) 37'; Kolodziejczak (yellow card) 73'	Report	Maïga (yellow card) 25'; Centonze (yellow card) 73'	Stadium: Stade Geoffroy-Guichard; Attendance: 0 Referee: Ruddy Buquet

14 February 2021 25	Metz	1–2	Strasbourg	Metz
15:00 CET (UTC+1)	Delaine 17', (yellow card) 26'; Kouyaté (yellow card) 44'	Report	Thomasson 33', 84'; Sissoko (yellow card) 42'	Stadium: Stade Saint-Symphorien; Attendance: 0 Referee: Mikael Lesage

21 February 2021 26	Nice	1–2	Metz	Nice
15:00 CET (UTC+1)	Gouiri 61' (pen.); Sellouki (yellow card) 90+1'	Report	Kouyaté 15', (yellow card) 90+1'; Gueye 38'	Stadium: Allianz Riviera; Attendance: 0 Referee: Jérémy Stinat

27 February 2021 27	Bordeaux	1–2	Metz	Bordeaux
13:00 CET (UTC+1)	Kalu 14'; Koscielny (yellow card) 54'	Report	Centonze (yellow card) 51'; Boulaya (yellow card) 57'; Delaine 72'; Vagner 90+1'	Stadium: Matmut Atlantique; Attendance: 0 Referee: Aurélien Petit

3 March 2021 28	Metz	0–1	Angers	Metz
19:00 CET (UTC+1)	Kouyaté (yellow card) 44'; Ambrose (yellow card) 76'; Oukidja (red card) 90+1'	Report	Fulgini 44' (pen.); Pereira Lage (yellow card) 79'; Doumbia (yellow card) 90+1'	Stadium: Stade Saint-Symphorien; Attendance: 0 Referee: Johan Hamel

14 March 2021 29	Lens	2–2	Metz	Lens
15:00 CET (UTC+1)	Gradit (yellow card) 8'; Clauss 13'; Haïdara (yellow card) 19'; Cahuzac 36'; Medina (yellow card) 37'; Fofana (yellow card) 86'	Report	Vagner 27' (pen.), (yellow card) 37'; Boye (yellow card) 50'; Delaine 57'; Sarr (yellow card) 82'	Stadium: Stade Bollaert-Delelis; Attendance: 0 Referee: Florent Batta

20 March 2021 30	Metz	1–3	Rennes	Metz
13:00 CET (UTC+1)	Yade 90'	Report	Doku 18', (red card) 51'; Terrier 38' (pen.); Gomis (yellow card) 84'; Guirassy 88', (yellow card) 90+1'	Stadium: Stade Saint-Symphorien; Attendance: 0 Referee: Willy Delajod

3 April 2021 31	Monaco	4–0	Metz	Monaco
13:00 CEST (UTC+2)	Fàbregas 50' (pen.); Volland 52'; Ben Yedder 77', 88' (pen.)	Report	Yade (yellow card) 36'; Caillard (yellow card) 48'; Kouyaté (yellow card) 85'; Boye (yellow card) 85' (yellow-red card) 88'; Centonze (yellow card) 90'	Stadium: Stade Louis II; Attendance: 0 Referee: Johan Hamel

9 April 2021 32	Metz	0–2	Lille	Metz
21:00 CEST (UTC+2)	Leya Iseka (penalty missed) 17'; Kouyaté (yellow card) 65'; Sarr (yellow card) 76'	Report	Fonte (yellow card) 16'; Yılmaz (yellow card) 45+2', (goal) 60'; Çelik 89'	Stadium: Stade Saint-Symphorien; Attendance: 0 Referee: Clément Turpin

18 April 2021 33	Reims	0–0	Metz	Reims
15:00 CEST (UTC+2)	Munetsi (yellow card) 18'; Konan (yellow card) 53'; Foket (yellow card) 65'	Report	Kouyaté (yellow card) 81'	Stadium: Stade Auguste-Delaune; Attendance: 0 Referee: Jérôme Miguelgorry

24 April 2021 34	Metz	1–3	Paris Saint-Germain	Metz
17:00 CEST (UTC+2)	Angban (yellow card) 15'; Centonze 46'	Report	Mbappé 4', 59', (yellow card) 58'; Verratti (yellow card) 37'; Kurzawa (yellow card) 60'; Herrera (yellow card) 79'; Icardi 89' (pen.)	Stadium: Stade Saint-Symphorien; Attendance: 0 Referee: Willy Delajod

2 May 2021 35	Dijon	1–5	Metz	Dijon
15:00 CEST (UTC+2)	Celina (red card) 43'; Baldé 48'; Lautoa (yellow card) 83'	Report	Yade (yellow card) 5'; Gueye 37'; Sarr 42'; Chafik 71' (o.g.); Vagner 82'; Bronn 85'	Stadium: Stade Gaston Gérard; Attendance: 0 Referee: Frank Schneider

9 May 2021 36	Metz	0–3	Nîmes	Metz
15:00 CEST (UTC+2)	Maïga (yellow card) 1'	Report	Fomba 61', (yellow card) 70'; Ripart 67' (pen.); Meling (yellow card) 69'; Ferhat 89'	Stadium: Stade Saint-Symphorien; Attendance: 0 Referee: François Letexier

16 May 2021 37	Lorient	2–1	Metz	Lorient
21:00 CEST (UTC+2)	Wissa 31' (pen.); Hergault 74'; Grbić (yellow card) 90+1'	Report	Kouyaté (yellow card) 23'; Bronn (yellow card) 30'; Ambrose (yellow card) 65'; Traoré 72'; Centonze (yellow card) 84'	Stadium: Stade du Moustoir; Attendance: 0 Referee: Florent Batta

23 May 2021 38	Metz	1–1	Marseille	Metz
21:00 CEST (UTC+2)	Bronn (yellow card) 36'; Sarr (yellow card) 41'; Ambrose (yellow card) 53'; Boulaya 90+6' (pen.)	Report	Lirola (yellow card) 70'; Payet (yellow card) 90'; Milik 90+13' (pen.)	Stadium: Stade Saint-Symphorien; Attendance: 0 Referee: Hakim Ben El Hadj

=== Coupe de France ===
10 February 2021 Round of 64	Amiens	1–2	Metz	Amiens
17:00 CET (UTC+1)	Wagué (yellow card) 32'; Blin 53'; Lachuer (yellow card) 54'; Yatabaré (yellow card) 90+3'	Report	Leya Iseka 1'; Vagner 90+4' (pen.)	Stadium: Stade de la Licorne; Attendance: 0 Referee: Olivier Thual

6 March 2021 Round of 32	Valenciennes	0–4	Metz	Valenciennes
16:30 CET (UTC+1)	Guillaume (penalty missed) 5'; Cuffaut (yellow card) 55'	Report	Centonze 7' (pen.); Ambrose 34' (pen.); Maziz (yellow card) 50'; Vagner 61'; Sarr 89'	Stadium: Stade du Hainaut; Attendance: 0 Referee: Stéphanie Frappart

6 April 2021 Round of 16	Monaco	0–0 (5–4 p)	Metz	Monaco
18:45 CEST (UTC+2)		Report	Angban (yellow card) 65'	Stadium: Stade Louis II; Attendance: 0 Referee: Jérémie Pignard
	Penalties
	Ben Yedder (penalty scored); Volland (penalty scored); Sidibé (penalty scored); Fàbregas (penalty scored); Jovetić (penalty scored)		(penalty scored) Sarr; (penalty scored) Yade; (penalty scored) Ambrose; (penalty missed) Maïga; (penalty scored) Bronn

== Statistics ==
=== Goalscorers ===
As of 18 October 2020

Rank	No.	Pos	Nat	Name	Ligue 1	Coupe de France	Total
1	7	FW	(Senegal)	Ibrahima Niane	6	0	6
2	11	MF	(Senegal)	Opa Nguette	1	0	1
Totals					7	0	7
