= 2018–19 FC Metz season =

FC Metz
2018–19 season
- Chairman: Bernard Serin
- Manager: Frédéric Antonetti
- Stadium: Stade Saint-Symphorien
- Ligue 2: 1st (promoted)
- Coupe de France: Round of 16
- Coupe de la Ligue: Third round
- Top goalscorer: League: Habib Diallo (26); All: Habib Diallo (26)
- Biggest win: 5–1 vs Orléans
Home colours	Away colours	Third colours

The 2018–19 season was the 87th season in the existence of FC Metz and the club's first season back in the second division of French football. In addition to the domestic league, Metz participated in this season's editions of the Coupe de France and the Coupe de la Ligue.

The club was crowned as champions of the campaign with two games to spare and promoted to the top flight after only one year.

== Players ==
=== First-team squad ===
As of 5 March 2019.

Note: Flags indicate national team as defined under FIFA eligibility rules; some limited exceptions apply. Players may hold more than one non-FIFA nationality.

No.	Pos.	Nation	Player
1	GK	FRA	Paul Delecroix
3	DF	FRA	Matthieu Udol
5	MF	CIV	Victorien Angban (on loan from Chelsea)
6	DF	MLI	Mamadou Fofana
7	FW	SEN	Ibrahima Niane
8	MF	FRA	Gauthier Hein
10	MF	FRA	Marvin Gakpa
11	FW	SEN	Opa Nguette
12	MF	SEN	Cheikh Sabaly
13	DF	ZAM	Stoppila Sunzu
14	MF	GAM	Ablie Jallow
16	GK	ALG	Alexandre Oukidja

No.	Pos.	Nation	Player
17	DF	FRA	Thomas Delaine
19	MF	CIV	Habib Maïga (on loan from St-Étienne)
20	FW	SEN	Habib Diallo
21	DF	GHA	John Boye
23	FW	SEN	Amadou Dia Ndiaye
24	MF	FRA	Renaud Cohade (captain)
25	DF	ALB	Iván Balliu
27	MF	ALG	Farid Boulaya
28	DF	FRA	Jonathan Rivierez
29	FW	FRA	Emmanuel Rivière
30	GK	FRA	Guillaume Dietsch
31	DF	LUX	Laurent Jans

=== On loan ===
Note: Flags indicate national team as defined under FIFA eligibility rules; some limited exceptions apply. Players may hold more than one non-FIFA nationality.

No.	Pos.	Nation	Player
—	DF	FRA	Oumar Gonzalez (on loan to Villefranche)
—	DF	FRA	Nicolas Basin (on loan to Avranches)
—	MF	POR	Cafú (on loan to Legia Warsaw)
—	MF	FRA	Youssef Maziz (on loan to Avranches)

No.	Pos.	Nation	Player
2	MF	CPV	Jamiro Monteiro (on loan to Philadelphia Union)
—	MF	ARG	Gerónimo Poblete (on loan to San Lorenzo)
—	MF	LUX	Vincent Thill (on loan to Pau)
9	FW	MLI	Adama Traoré (on loan to Orléans)

== Pre-season and friendlies ==
Win Draw Loss

3 July 2018 Friendly	Metz (France)	3–1	(Luxembourg) Jeunesse Esch	Homécourt, France
17:30 CEST (UTC+2)				Stadium: Stade Yvan Tepus

6 July 2018 Friendly	SV Sandhausen (Germany)	1–0	(France) Metz	Forbach, France
18:00 CEST (UTC+2)				Stadium: Schlossberg Stadium

10 July 2018 Friendly	Troyes (France)	2–3	(France) Metz	Verdun, France
17:30 CEST (UTC+2)				Stadium: Stade du Parc de Londres

13 July 2018 Friendly	Metz (France)	0–0	(France) Auxerre	Saint-Dizier, France
17:45 CEST (UTC+2)				Stadium: Stade Marcel Jacquin

21 July 2018 Friendly	Kortrijk (Belgium)	1–2	(France) Metz	Kortrijk, France
18:00 CEST (UTC+2)				Stadium: Guldensporen Stadion

25 July 2018 Friendly	Metz (France)	2–0	(Luxembourg) Racing	Homécourt, France
19:00 CEST (UTC+2)				Stadium: Stade Yvan Tepus

== Competitions ==
=== Overview ===
Competition	First match	Last match	Starting round	Final position	Record							
Competition	First match	Last match	Starting round	Final position	Pld	W	D	L	GF	GA	GD	Win %
Ligue 2	30 July 2018	17 May 2019	Matchday 1	Winners	38	24	9	5	60	23	+37	63.16
Coupe de France	18 November 2018	5 February 2019	Seventh round	Round of 16	5	3	1	1	7	4	+3	60.00
Coupe de la Ligue	14 August 2018	31 October 2018	First round	Third round	3	1	1	1	4	4	+0	33.33
Total					46	28	11	7	71	31	+40	60.87

Source: Soccerway

=== Ligue 2 ===
==== League table ====
Pos	Team	Pld	W	D	L	GF	GA	GD	Pts	Promotion or Relegation
1	Metz (C, P)	38	24	9	5	60	23	+37	81	Promotion to Ligue 1
2	Brest (P)	38	21	11	6	64	35	+29	74	Promotion to Ligue 1
3	Troyes	38	21	8	9	51	28	+23	71	Qualification to promotion play-offs semi-final
4	Paris FC	38	17	14	7	36	22	+14	65	Qualification to promotion play-offs quarter-final
5	Lens	38	18	9	11	49	28	+21	63	Qualification to promotion play-offs quarter-final

Source: Ligue 2
Rules for classification: 1) Points; 2) Goal difference; 3) Number of goals scored; 4) Head-to-head goal difference; 5) Fair play points
(C) Champions; (P) Promoted

==== Results summary ====
Overall								Home						Away					
Pld	W	D	L	GF	GA	GD	Pts	W	D	L	GF	GA	GD	W	D	L	GF	GA	GD
38	24	9	5	60	23	+37	81	13	3	3	34	11	+23	11	6	2	26	12	+14

Source: Ligue 2

==== Results by round ====
Round	1	2	3	4	5	6	7	8	9	10	11	12	13	14	15	16	17	18	19	20	21	22	23	24	25	26	27	28	29	30	31	32	33	34	35	36	37	38
Ground	A	H	A	H	A	H	A	A	H	A	H	A	H	A	H	A	H	A	H	A	H	A	H	A	H	H	A	H	A	H	A	H	A	H	A	H	A	H
Result	W	W	W	W	W	W	W	L	L	W	W	D	L	W	W	D	W	W	W	W	L	D	D	D	W	W	D	D	W	W	D	W	W	D	W	W	L	W
Position	5	1	1	1	1	1	1	1	1	1	1	1	1	1	1	1	1	1	1	1	1	1	1	1	1	1	1	1	1	1	1	1	1	1	1	1	1	1

Source: Ligue 2
A = Away; H = Home; W = Win; D = Draw; L = Loss
Notes: Match 19 versus Nancy was postponed until 29 January 2019 and therefore should appear between matches 22 & 23.

==== Matches ====
The league fixtures were announced on 7 June 2018.

30 July 2018 1	Brest	0–1	Metz	Brest
20:45 CEST (UTC+2)		Report	Niane 13'	Stadium: Stade Francis-Le Blé; Referee: Eric Wattellier

3 August 2018 2	Metz	5–1	Orléans	Metz
20:00 CEST (UTC+2)	Boulaya 19'; Diallo 33', 47', 57', 90'	Report	Tell 50'	Stadium: Stade Saint-Symphorien; Referee: Aurélien Petit

11 August 2018 3	Clermont	2–3	Metz	Clermont-Ferrand
15:00 CEST (UTC+2)	Pereira Lage 7'; Ayé 59'	Report	Niane 61'; Diallo 76'; Boulaya 88'	Stadium: Stade Gabriel Montpied; Referee: Pierre Gaillouste

20 August 2018 4	Metz	3–1	Ajaccio	Metz
20:45 CEST (UTC+2)	Diallo 43', 71' (pen.); Niane 83'	Report	Gimbert 76'	Stadium: Stade Saint-Symphorien; Referee: Hakim Ben El Hadj

24 August 2018 5	Troyes	0–1	Metz	Troyes
20:00 CEST (UTC+2)		Report	Angban 40'	Stadium: Stade de l'Aube; Referee: Ruddy Buquet

1 September 2018 6	Metz	2–0	Lens	Metz
15:00 CEST (UTC+2)	Diallo 48'; Niane 90'	Report		Stadium: Stade Saint-Symphorien; Referee: Florent Batta

17 September 2018 7	Béziers	1–3	Metz	Béziers
20:45 CEST (UTC+2)		Report		Stadium: Stade Raoul-Barrière; Referee: Mikael Lesage

22 September 2018 8	Paris FC	2–1	Metz	Paris
15:00 CET (UTC+1)		Report		Stadium: Stade Sébastien Charléty; Referee: Pierre Gaillouste

29 September 2018 9	Metz	0–1	Le Havre	Metz
15:00 CEST (UTC+2)		Report		Stadium: Stade Saint-Symphorien; Referee: Bartolomeu Varela

8 October 2018 10	Sochaux	1–2	Metz	Montbéliard
20:45 CEST (UTC+2)		Report		Stadium: Stade Auguste Bonal; Referee: Romain Lissorgue

19 October 2018 11	Metz	3–0	Niort	Metz
20:00 CEST (UTC+2)		Report		Stadium: Stade Saint-Symphorien; Referee: Jérémie Pignard

26 October 2018 12	Lorient	0–0	Metz	Lorient
20:00 CET (UTC+1)		Report		Stadium: Stade du Moustoir; Referee: Mikael Lesage

5 November 2018 13	Metz	0–1	Auxerre	Metz
20:45 CET (UTC+1)		Report		Stadium: Stade Saint-Symphorien; Referee: Mehdi Mokhtari

9 November 2018 14	Châteauroux	1–2	Metz	Châteauroux
20:00 CET (UTC+1)		Report		Stadium: Stade Gaston Petit; Referee: Faouzi Benchabane

26 November 2018 15	Metz	1–0	Gazélec Ajaccio	Metz
20:45 CET (UTC+1)	Diallo 22' (pen.)	Report		Stadium: Stade Saint-Symphorien; Referee: Stéphanie Frappart

1 December 2018 16	Grenoble	1–1	Metz	Grenoble
14:00 CET (UTC+1)		Report		Stadium: Stade des Alpes; Referee: Mikael Lesage

4 December 2018 17	Metz	2–0	Red Star	Metz
21:00 CET (UTC+1)	Diallo 54', 77' (pen.)	Report		Stadium: Stade Saint-Symphorien; Referee: Sylvain Palhies

17 December 2018 18	Valenciennes	0–2	Metz	Valenciennes
20:45 CET (UTC+1)		Report		Stadium: Stade du Hainaut; Referee: Yohann Rouinsard

11 January 2019 20	Orléans	0–1	Metz	Orléans
CET (UTC+1)		Report		Stadium: Stade de la Source

18 January 2019 21	Metz	1–2	Clermont	Metz
20:00 CET (UTC+1)		Report		Stadium: Stade Saint-Symphorien; Referee: Alexandre Perreau Niel

25 January 2019 22	Ajaccio	0–0	Metz	Ajaccio
20:00 CET (UTC+1)		Report		Stadium: Stade François Coty; Referee: Sylvain Palhies

29 January 2019 19	Metz	3–0	Nancy	Metz
19:00 CET (UTC+1)		Report		Stadium: Stade Saint-Symphorien; Referee: Olivier Thual

1 February 2019 23	Metz	1–1	Troyes	Metz
CET (UTC+1)		Report		Stadium: Stade Saint-Symphorien

9 February 2019 24	Lens	0–0	Metz	Lens
CET (UTC+1)		Report		Stadium: Stade Bollaert-Delelis

18 February 2019 25	Metz	1–0	Béziers	Metz
CET (UTC+1)		Report		Stadium: Stade Saint-Symphorien

22 February 2019 26	Metz	2–0	Paris FC	Metz
CET (UTC+1)		Report		Stadium: Stade Saint-Symphorien

4 March 2019 27	Le Havre	2–2	Metz	Le Havre
CET (UTC+1)		Report		Stadium: Stade Océane

11 March 2019 28	Metz	1–1	Sochaux	Metz
CET (UTC+1)		Report		Stadium: Stade Saint-Symphorien

15 March 2019 29	Niort	0–3	Metz	Niort
CET (UTC+1)		Report		Stadium: Stade René Gaillard

31 March 2019 30	Metz	2–1	Lorient	Metz
CEST (UTC+2)		Report		Stadium: Stade Saint-Symphorien

6 April 2019 31	Auxerre	0–0	Metz	Auxerre
CEST (UTC+2)		Report		Stadium: Stade Abbé-Deschamps

12 April 2019 32	Metz	2–1	Châteauroux	Metz
CEST (UTC+2)		Report		Stadium: Stade Saint-Symphorien

19 April 2019 33	Gazélec Ajaccio	0–2	Metz	Ajaccio
20:00 CEST (UTC+2)		Report	Boye 54'; Niane 76'	Stadium: Stade Ange Casanova; Referee: Sylvain Palhies

23 April 2019 34	Metz	1–1	Grenoble	Metz
20:00 CEST (UTC+2)	Niane 9'	Report	Sotoca 20'	Stadium: Stade Saint-Symphorien; Referee: Pierre Gaillouste

26 April 2019 35	Red Star	1–2	Metz	Beauvais
20:00 CEST (UTC+2)		Report		Stadium: Stade Pierre Brisson

3 May 2019 36	Metz	3–0	Valenciennes	Metz
20:00 CEST (UTC+2)	Nguette 17'; Diallo 25', 30' (pen.)	Report		Stadium: Stade Saint-Symphorien; Referee: Benjamin Lepaysant

10 May 2019 37	Nancy	1–0	Metz	Tomblaine
20:45 CEST (UTC+2)	Bassi 34'	Report		Stadium: Stade Marcel Picot; Referee: Willy Delajod

17 May 2019 38	Metz	1–0	Brest	Metz
20:45 CEST (UTC+2)	Diallo 17'	Report		Stadium: Stade Saint-Symphorien; Referee: Yohann Rouinsard

=== Coupe de France ===
18 November 2018 Seventh round	Sarreguemines FC	1–1 (a.e.t.) (1–4 p)	Metz	Sarreguemines
13:30 CET (UTC+1)	Simpara 64'	Report	Niane 45+1' (pen.)	Stadium: Stade de la Blies; Attendance: 2,307; Referee: Mickaël Leleu

9 December 2018 Eighth round	CMS Oissel	0–1	Metz	Oissel
13:30 CET (UTC+1)		Report	Gakpa 31'	Stadium: Stade Marcel Billard; Attendance: 677; Referee: Marc Michout

5 January 2019 Round of 64	Olympique Saint-Quentin	1–2 (a.e.t.)	Metz	Saint-Quentin
18:00 CET (UTC+1)	Cambrone 50'	Report	Cohade 45'; Balliu 101'	Stadium: Stade Paul Débrésie; Attendance: 3,844; Referee: Mikaël Lesage

22 January 2019 Round of 32	Monaco	1–3	Metz	Monaco
20:55 CET (UTC+1)	Falcao 40'	Report	Hein 32'; Gakpa 62'; Niane 74'	Stadium: Stade Louis II; Attendance: 600; Referee: Antony Gautier

5 February 2019 Round of 16	Metz	0–1	Orléans	Metz
18:30 CET (UTC+1)		Report	Lecoeuche 20' (pen.)	Stadium: Stade Saint-Symphorien; Attendance: 3,200; Referee: Hakim Ben El Hadj

=== Coupe de la Ligue ===
14 August 2018 First round	Metz	2–1	Grenoble	Metz
20:00 CEST (UTC+2)	Niane 71' (pen.), 90+5' (pen.)	Report	Chergui 17'	Stadium: Stade Saint-Symphorien; Attendance: 9,494; Referee: Mehdi Mokhtari

28 August 2018 Second round	Lens	1–1 (3–5 p)	Metz	Lens
20:45 CEST (UTC+2)	Ba 86'	Report	Jallow 45'	Stadium: Stade Bollaert-Delelis; Attendance: 14,963; Referee: Olivier Thual
	Penalties
	Ba (penalty scored); Fortuné (penalty scored); Chouiar (penalty missed); Gomis (penalty scored)		(penalty scored) Niane; (penalty scored) Gakpa; (penalty scored) Balliu; (penalty scored) Rivierez; (penalty scored) Diallo

31 October 2018 Third round	Metz	1–2	Amiens	Metz
21:05 CEST (UTC+2)	Rivière 70'	Report	Niane 5' (o.g.); Otero 72'	Stadium: Stade Saint-Symphorien; Attendance: 5,220; Referee: Nicolas Rainville

== Statistics ==
=== Goalscorers ===
As of 17 May 2019

Rank	No.	Pos	Nat	Name	Ligue 1	Coupe de France	Coupe de la Ligue	Total
1	20	FW	(Senegal)	Habib Diallo	26	0	0	26
2	7	FW	(Senegal)	Ibrahima Niane	10	2	2	14
3	11	FW	(Senegal)	Opa Nguette	7	0	0	7
3	27	MF	(Algeria)	Farid Boulaya	7	0	0	7
5	10	MF	(France)	Marvin Gakpa	2	2	0	4
6	29	FW	(France)	Emmanuel Rivière	2	0	1	3
7	13	DF	(Zambia)	Stoppila Sunzu	2	0	0	2
7	19	MF	(Ivory Coast)	Habib Maïga	2	0	0	2
9	24	MF	(France)	Renaud Cohade	0	1	0	1
9	21	DF	(Ghana)	John Boye	1	0	0	1
9	25	DF	(Albania)	Iván Balliu	0	1	0	1
9	5	MF	(Ivory Coast)	Victorien Angban	1	0	0	1
9	14	MF	(The Gambia)	Ablie Jallow	0	0	1	1
9	8	MF	(France)	Gauthier Hein	0	1	0	1
Totals					60	7	4	71
