= 2019–20 FC Metz season =

Metz
2019–20 season
- President: Bernard Serin
- Head coach: Vincent Hognon
- Stadium: Stade Saint-Symphorien
- Ligue 1: 15th
- Coupe de France: Round of 64
- Coupe de la Ligue: Round of 32
- Top goalscorer: League: Habib Diallo (12); All: Habib Diallo (12)
- Highest home attendance: 20,685 (vs Paris Saint-Germain, 30 August 2019)
- Lowest home attendance: 14,214 (vs Rennes, 4 December 2019)
- Average home league attendance: 16,221
- Biggest win: Metz 3–0 Monaco
- Biggest defeat: Angers 3–0 Metz
| Home colours | Away colours | Third colours |

The 2019–20 FC Metz season was the club's 100th season in existence and the club's 1st season back in the top flight of French football. In addition to the domestic league, Metz participated in this season's editions of the Coupe de France, and the Coupe de la Ligue. The season covered the period from 1 July 2019 to 30 June 2020.

== Players ==
=== Current squad ===
As of 19 January 2020.

Note: Flags indicate national team as defined under FIFA eligibility rules; some limited exceptions apply. Players may hold more than one non-FIFA nationality.

| No. | Pos. | Nation | Player |
|---|---|---|---|
| 1 | GK | FRA | Paul Delecroix |
| 2 | DF | TUN | Dylan Bronn |
| 3 | DF | FRA | Matthieu Udol |
| 4 | MF | FRA | Kévin N'Doram (on loan from Monaco) |
| 5 | MF | CIV | Victorien Angban |
| 6 | MF | MLI | Mamadou Fofana |
| 7 | FW | SEN | Ibrahima Niane |
| 8 | MF | MLI | Boubacar Traoré |
| 9 | FW | FRA | Thierry Ambrose (on loan from Manchester City) |
| 10 | MF | FRA | Marvin Gakpa |
| 11 | MF | SEN | Opa Nguette |
| 14 | MF | FRA | Vincent Pajot (on loan from Angers) |
| 13 | DF | ZAM | Stoppila Sunzu |
| 15 | DF | SEN | Ababacar Lô |

| No. | Pos. | Nation | Player |
|---|---|---|---|
| 16 | GK | ALG | Alexandre Oukidja |
| 17 | DF | FRA | Thomas Delaine |
| 18 | DF | FRA | Fabien Centonze |
| 19 | MF | CIV | Habib Maïga |
| 20 | FW | SEN | Habib Diallo |
| 21 | DF | GHA | John Boye |
| 22 | MF | BEL | Sami Lahssaini |
| 23 | FW | SEN | Amadou Dia N'Diaye |
| 24 | MF | FRA | Renaud Cohade (captain) |
| 25 | MF | MLI | Adama Noss Traoré (on loan from Monaco) |
| 26 | FW | MTN | Pape Ndiaga Yade |
| 27 | MF | ALG | Farid Boulaya |
| 28 | DF | FRA | Manuel Cabit |
| 29 | DF | FRA | Lenny Lacroix |
| 30 | GK | FRA | Guillaume Dietsch |

=== Out on loan ===
Note: Flags indicate national team as defined under FIFA eligibility rules; some limited exceptions apply. Players may hold more than one non-FIFA nationality.

| No. | Pos. | Nation | Player |
|---|---|---|---|
| — | DF | LUX | Laurent Jans (on loan to Paderborn) |
| — | DF | SEN | Mohamed Kane (on loan to Bastia-Borgo) |
| — | MF | FRA | Gauthier Hein (on loan to Valenciennes) |
| — | MF | GAM | Ablie Jallow (on loan to Ajaccio) |
| — | MF | FRA | Youssef Maziz (on loan to Le Mans) |

| No. | Pos. | Nation | Player |
|---|---|---|---|
| — | MF | FRA | Raouf Mroivili (on loan to Seraing United) |
| — | MF | SEN | Cheikh Sabaly (on loan to Pau) |
| — | MF | LUX | Vincent Thill (on loan to Orléans) |
| — | FW | HAI | Leverton Pierre (on loan to Dunkerque) |

== Pre-season and friendlies ==
Win Draw Loss

| 24 July 2019 Friendly | Reims (France) | 2–0 | (France) Metz | Épernay, France |
| 18:00 CEST (UTC+2) | Cassamá 20'; Mbemba 61' | Report | | Stadium: Stade Paul Chandon |

| 31 July 2019 Friendly | Metz (France) | 2–0 | (Belgium) RFC Seraing | Molsheim, France |
| 18:00 CEST (UTC+2) | Nguette 18'; Gakpa 20' | Report | | Stadium: Parc des Sports de Molsheim |

| 3 August 2019 Friendly | Metz (France) | 0–1 | (Germany) Mainz 05 | Molsheim, France |
| 11:00 CEST (UTC+2) | | Report | Onisiwo 36' | Stadium: Parc des Sports de Molsheim |

| 3 August 2019 Friendly | Metz (France) | 0–1 | (Germany) Mainz 05 | Molsheim, France |
| 13:30 CEST (UTC+2) | | Report | Öztunalı 86' | Stadium: Parc des Sports de Molsheim |

== Competitions ==
=== Overview ===
| Competition | First match | Last match | Starting round | Final position | Record | | | | | | | |
| Competition | First match | Last match | Starting round | Final position | Pld | W | D | L | GF | GA | GD | Win % |
|---|---|---|---|---|---|---|---|---|---|---|---|---|
| Ligue 1 | 11 August 2019 | 7 March 2020 | Matchday 1 | 15th | 28 | 8 | 10 | 10 | 27 | 35 | −8 | 28.57 |
| Coupe de France | 6 January 2020 | | Round of 64 | Round of 64 | 1 | 0 | 0 | 1 | 0 | 3 | −3 | 0.00 |
| Coupe de la Ligue | 30 October 2019 | | Round of 32 | Round of 32 | 1 | 0 | 1 | 0 | 1 | 1 | +0 | 0.00 |
| Total | | | | | 30 | 8 | 11 | 11 | 28 | 39 | −11 | 26.67 |

Source: Soccerway

=== Ligue 1 ===
==== League table ====
| Pos | Team | Pld | W | D | L | GF | GA | GD | Pts | PPG |
|---|---|---|---|---|---|---|---|---|---|---|
| 13 | Nantes | 28 | 11 | 4 | 13 | 28 | 31 | −3 | 37 (Note: Bordeaux finished ahead of Nantes on head-to-head points: Bordeaux 2–0 Nantes, Nantes 0–1 Bordeaux.) | 1.32 |
| 14 | Brest | 28 | 8 | 10 | 10 | 34 | 37 | −3 | 34 | 1.21 |
| 15 | Metz | 28 | 8 | 10 | 10 | 27 | 35 | −8 | 34 | 1.21 |
| 16 | Dijon | 28 | 7 | 9 | 12 | 27 | 37 | −10 | 30 | 1.07 |
| 17 | Saint-Étienne | 28 | 8 | 6 | 14 | 29 | 45 | −16 | 30 | 1.07 |

Source: Ligue 1
Rules for classification: 1) Points per game; 2) Head-to-head points; 3) Head-to-head goal difference; 4) Goal difference; 5) Goals scored; 6) Fairplay ranking.

==== Results summary ====
| Overall | | | | | | | | Home | | | | | | Away | | | | | |
| Pld | W | D | L | GF | GA | GD | Pts | W | D | L | GF | GA | GD | W | D | L | GF | GA | GD |
|---|---|---|---|---|---|---|---|---|---|---|---|---|---|---|---|---|---|---|---|
| 28 | 8 | 10 | 10 | 27 | 35 | −8 | 34 | 5 | 4 | 5 | 18 | 17 | +1 | 3 | 6 | 5 | 9 | 18 | −9 |

Source: Ligue 1

==== Results by round ====
| Round | 1 | 2 | 3 | 4 | 5 | 6 | 7 | 8 | 9 | 10 | 11 | 12 | 13 | 14 | 15 | 16 | 17 | 18 | 19 | 20 | 21 | 22 | 23 | 24 | 25 | 26 | 27 | 28 | 29 | 30 | 31 | 32 | 33 | 34 | 35 | 36 | 37 | 38 |
|---|---|---|---|---|---|---|---|---|---|---|---|---|---|---|---|---|---|---|---|---|---|---|---|---|---|---|---|---|---|---|---|---|---|---|---|---|---|---|
| Ground | A | H | A | H | A | H | A | H | A | H | A | H | A | H | A | H | A | H | A | H | A | H | A | H | A | H | A | H | A | H | A | H | A | H | A | H | A | H |
| Result | D | W | L | L | L | L | W | D | L | W | L | D | D | D | D | L | L | D | D | W | W | W | D | L | D | L | W | W | C | C | C | C | C | C | C | C | C | C |
| Position | 10 | 4 | 10 | 15 | 17 | 18 | 16 | 17 | 20 | 16 | 19 | 19 | 17 | 18 | 17 | 18 | 18 | 18 | 17 | 17 | 16 | 16 | 16 | 16 | 15 | 16 | 15 | 15 | 15 | 15 | 15 | 15 | 15 | 15 | 15 | 15 | 15 | 15 |

Source: Ligue 1
A = Away; H = Home; W = Win; D = Draw; L = Loss; C = Cancelled

==== Matches ====
The Ligue 1 schedule was announced on 14 June 2019. The Ligue 1 matches were suspended by the LFP on 13 March 2020 due to COVID-19 until further notices. On 28 April 2020, it was announced that Ligue 1 and Ligue 2 campaigns would not resume, after the country banned all sporting events until September. On 30 April, The LFP ended officially the 2019–20 season.

| 11 August 2019 1 | Strasbourg | 1–1 | Metz | Strasbourg |
| 17:00 CEST (UTC+2) | Thomasson 21' | Report | Delaine (yellow card) 15'; Diallo 47' | Stadium: Stade de la Meinau; Attendance: 25,476; Referee: Antony Gautier |

| 17 August 2019 2 | Metz | 3–0 | Monaco | Metz |
| 20:00 CEST (UTC+2) | Diallo 11' (pen.), 54'; Centonze (yellow card) 27'; Cohade 66' | Report | Glik (yellow card) 10'; Aguilar (red card) 34'; Gelson (yellow card) 35' | Stadium: Stade Saint-Symphorien; Attendance: 19,084; Referee: Eric Wattellier |

| 24 August 2019 3 | Angers | 3–0 | Metz | Angers |
| 20:00 CEST (UTC+2) | El Melali 4'; Santamaria 43'; Bahoken (yellow card) 53'; Alioui 67' | Report | Sunzu (yellow card) 1'; Centonze (yellow card) 75' | Stadium: Stade Raymond Kopa; Attendance: 9,001; Referee: Stéphanie Frappart |

| 30 August 2019 4 | Metz | 0–2 | Paris Saint-Germain | Metz |
| 20:45 CEST (UTC+2) | Fofana (yellow card) 27' | Report | Di María 11' (pen.); Choupo-Moting 44' | Stadium: Stade Saint-Symphorien; Attendance: 20,685; Referee: Frank Schneider |

| 14 September 2019 5 | Bordeaux | 2–0 | Metz | Bordeaux |
| 20:00 CEST (UTC+2) | Briand 7'; De Préville 9', (yellow card) 59'; Kamano (yellow card) 67' | Report | N'Doram (yellow card) 60'; Maïga (yellow card) 82' | Stadium: Matmut Atlantique; Attendance: 14,352; Referee: Mikael Lesage |

| 21 September 2019 6 | Metz | 1–2 | Amiens | Metz |
| 20:00 CEST (UTC+2) | Diallo 69'; Sunzu (yellow card) 90' | Report | Guirassy 40', (yellow card) 87'; Dibassy 55' | Stadium: Stade Saint-Symphorien; Attendance: 15,106; Referee: Hakim Ben El Hadj |

| 25 September 2019 7 | Saint-Étienne | 0–1 | Metz | Saint-Étienne |
| 19:00 CEST (UTC+2) | Kolodziejczak (yellow card) 52'; Nordin (yellow card) 61'; Khazri (yellow card) 84'; Bouanga (yellow card) 88' | Report | Diallo 19'; Traoré (yellow card) 25'; Cohade (yellow card) 84' | Stadium: Stade Geoffroy-Guichard; Attendance: 19,712; Referee: Eric Wattellier |

| 28 September 2019 8 | Metz | 2–2 | Toulouse | Metz |
| 21:00 CEST (UTC+2) | Diallo 4'; Delaine (yellow card) 11'; Niane 90+1' (pen.) | Report | Saïd 86'; Gradel (yellow card) 90+5'; Koulouris 90+6' | Stadium: Stade Saint-Symphorien; Attendance: 15,054; Referee: Florent Batta |

| 5 October 2019 9 | Brest | 2–0 | Metz | Brest |
| 20:00 CEST (UTC+2) | Faussurier 11'; Court (yellow card) 28'; Castelletto 45'; Cardona (yellow card) 90' | Report | Cohade (yellow card) 51' | Stadium: Stade Francis-Le Blé; Attendance: 12,682; Referee: Antony Gautier |

| 19 October 2019 10 | Metz | 1–0 | Nantes | Metz |
| 20:00 CEST (UTC+2) | Cabit (yellow card) 49'; Maïga (yellow card) 72'; Diallo 87' | Report | Wagué (red card) 62'; Abeid (yellow card) 72' | Stadium: Stade Saint-Symphorien; Attendance: 16,533; Referee: Jérémie Pignard |

| 26 October 2019 11 | Lyon | 2–0 | Metz | Décines-Charpieu |
| 20:00 CEST (UTC+2) | Depay 28'; Dembélé 33' (pen.); Tousart (yellow card) 38' | Report | Fofana (yellow card) 10'; Cabit (yellow card) 32' | Stadium: Parc Olympique Lyonnais; Attendance: 48,889; Referee: Johan Hamel |

| 2 November 2019 12 | Metz | 2–2 | Montpellier | Metz |
| 20:00 CET (UTC+1) | Diallo 26', (yellow card) 52'; Nguette 48' | Report | Hilton (yellow card) 39'; Congré (yellow card) 63'; Delort 73'; Sambia 79' | Stadium: Stade Saint-Symphorien; Attendance: 14,644; Referee: Stéphanie Frappart |

| 9 November 2019 13 | Lille | 0–0 | Metz | Villeneuve-d'Ascq |
| 20:00 CET (UTC+1) | Reinildo (yellow card) 63'; André (yellow card) 76' | Report | Delaine (yellow card) 50'; Oukidja (yellow card) 74' | Stadium: Stade Pierre-Mauroy; Attendance: 33,425; Referee: Florent Batta |

| 23 November 2019 14 | Metz | 1–1 | Reims | Metz |
| 20:00 CET (UTC+1) | Boye (yellow card) 13'; Traoré 47'; Diallo (yellow card) 90+1' | Report | Disasi 7'; Cafaro (yellow card) 42' (yellow-red card) 90' | Stadium: Stade Saint-Symphorien; Attendance: 14,445; Referee: Antony Gautier |

| 30 November 2019 14 | Nîmes | 1–1 | Metz | Nîmes |
| 20:00 CET (UTC+1) | Philippoteaux (yellow card) 46'; Ripart 61' | Report | Nguette (yellow card) 24'; Cohade (yellow card) 29'; Diallo 31'; Maïga (yellow card) 65'; Fofana (yellow card) 82'; Boye (yellow card) 90+1'; Boulaya (yellow card) 90+1' | Stadium: Stade des Costières; Attendance: 12,180; Referee: Hakim Ben El Hadj |

| 4 December 2019 16 | Metz | 0–1 | Rennes | Metz |
| 19:00 CET (UTC+1) | Ambrose (yellow card) 69'; Delaine (yellow card) 80' | Report | Hunou 39' | Stadium: Stade Saint-Symphorien; Attendance: 14,214; Referee: Karim Abed |

| 7 December 2019 17 | Nice | 4–1 | Metz | Nice |
| 20:00 CET (UTC+1) | Cyprien 10', 41' (pen.); Ganago 59'; Lees-Melou 76' | Report | Boye (yellow card) 35'; Niane 74'; Centonze (yellow card) 82' | Stadium: Allianz Riviera; Attendance: 14,967; Referee: Jérémie Pignard |

| 14 December 2019 18 | Metz | 1–1 | Marseille | Metz |
| 17:30 CET (UTC+1) | Nguette 40'; Maïga (yellow card) 45+1'; Boye (yellow card) 85'; Udol (yellow card) 90+1'; Fofana (yellow card) 90+4' | Report | Sarr (yellow card) 25'; Radonjić 70' | Stadium: Stade Saint-Symphorien; Attendance: 20,586; Referee: Willy Delajod |

| 21 December 2019 19 | Dijon | 2–2 | Metz | Dijon |
| 20:45 CET (UTC+1) | Amalfitano 18', (yellow card) 87'; Baldé 42'; Mendyl (yellow card) 71' | Report | Diallo 14'; Udol (yellow card) 45'; Sunzu (red card) 53'; Maïga 90+1', (yellow card) 90+2' | Stadium: Stade Gaston Gérard; Attendance: 12,309; Referee: Johan Hamel |

| 11 January 2020 20 | Metz | 1–0 | Strasbourg | Metz |
| 20:00 CET (UTC+1) | Boye 68', (yellow card) 74' | Report | Sissoko (yellow card) 54'; Djiku (yellow card) 86' | Stadium: Stade Saint-Symphorien; Attendance: 18,079; Referee: Jérôme Brisard |

| 25 January 2020 21 | Reims | 0–1 | Metz | Reims |
| 20:00 CET (UTC+1) | Doumbia (yellow card) 39' | Report | Diallo 3'; Maïga (yellow card) 59' | Stadium: Stade Auguste Delaune; Attendance: 11,818; Referee: Jérémie Pignard |

| 2 February 2020 22 | Metz | 3–1 | Saint-Étienne | Metz |
| 17:00 CET (UTC+1) | Nguette 44', 70'; Diallo 63' | Report | Hamouma (yellow card) 52', (goal) 89'; Cabaye (yellow card) 73' | Stadium: Stade Saint-Symphorien; Attendance: 15,636; Referee: Antony Gautier |

| 5 February 2020 23 | Montpellier | 1–1 | Metz | Montpellier |
| 19:00 CET (UTC+1) | Savanier 13'; Souquet (yellow card) 14'; Ferri (yellow card) 39' | Report | N'Doram (yellow card) 64'; Boulaya 80' | Stadium: Stade de la Mosson; Attendance: 10,786; Referee: Hakim Ben El Hadj |

| 8 February 2020 24 | Metz | 1–2 | Bordeaux | Metz |
| 20:00 CET (UTC+1) | Niane 2'; Pajot (red card) 8'; Maïga (yellow card) 39'; Oukidja (yellow card) 80' | Report | Hwang (yellow card) 41'; Bašić 51'; De Préville (yellow card) 62'; Oudin 84' | Stadium: Stade Saint-Symphorien; Attendance: 15,054; Referee: François Letexier |

| 15 February 2020 25 | Nantes | 0–0 | Metz | Nantes |
| 20:00 CET (UTC+1) | | Report | Udol (yellow card) 57'; Boulaya (red card) 84' | Stadium: Stade de la Beaujoire; Attendance: 20,444; Referee: Jérémy Stinat |

| 21 February 2020 26 | Metz | 0–2 | Lyon | Metz |
| 20:45 CET (UTC+1) | Oukidja (yellow card) 45+6'; Diallo (red card) 82' | Report | Cornet (yellow card) 35'; Dembélé 45+7' (pen.); Aouar 90+4' | Stadium: Stade Saint-Symphorien; Attendance: 18,247; Referee: Eric Wattellier |

| 29 February 2020 27 | Amiens | 0–1 | Metz | Amiens |
| 20:00 CET (UTC+1) | Blin (yellow card) 59'; Zungu (yellow card) 67' | Report | Boye (yellow card) 18'; Boulaya 26' | Stadium: Stade de la Licorne; Attendance: 12,375; Referee: Johan Hamel |

| 7 March 2020 28 | Metz | 2–1 | Nîmes | Metz |
| 20:00 CET (UTC+1) | Nguette 7'; Boye 81' | Report | Deaux 49' | Stadium: Stade Saint-Symphorien; Attendance: 14,797; Referee: Ruddy Buquet |

| 29 | Toulouse | Cancelled | Metz | Toulouse |
| --:-- CEST (UTC+2) | | | | Stadium: Stadium de Toulouse; Attendance: 0 |

| 30 | Metz | Cancelled | Brest | Metz |
| --:-- CEST (UTC+2) | | | | Stadium: Stade Saint-Symphorien; Attendance: 0 |

| 31 | Paris Saint-Germain | Cancelled | Metz | Paris |
| --:-- CEST (UTC+2) | | | | Stadium: Parc des Princes; Attendance: 0 |

| 32 | Metz | Cancelled | Lille | Metz |
| --:-- CEST (UTC+2) | | | | Stadium: Stade Saint-Symphorien; Attendance: 0 |

| 33 | Rennes | Cancelled | Metz | Rennes |
| --:-- CEST (UTC+2) | | | | Stadium: Roazhon Park |

| 34 | Metz | Cancelled | Dijon | Metz |
| --:-- CEST (UTC+2) | | | | Stadium: Stade Saint-Symphorien |

| 35 | Monaco | Cancelled | Metz | Monaco |
| --:-- CEST (UTC+2) | | | | Stadium: Stade Louis II |

| 36 | Metz | Cancelled | Nice | Metz |
| --:-- CEST (UTC+2) | | | | Stadium: Stade Saint-Symphorien |

| 37 | Marseille | Cancelled | Metz | Marseille |
| --:-- CEST (UTC+2) | | | | Stadium: Stade Vélodrome |

| 38 | Metz | Cancelled | Angers | Metz |
| --:-- CEST (UTC+2) | | | | Stadium: Stade Saint-Symphorien |

=== Coupe de France ===
| 6 January 2020 Round of 64 | FC Rouen | 3–0 | Metz | Le Petit-Quevilly |
| 20:55 CET (UTC+1) | Dembi 6', (yellow card) 7'; Ouadah (yellow card) 70'; Fataki 77'; Diarra 88' | Report | Delaine (yellow card) 58'; Angban (yellow card) 90+3' | Stadium: Stade Robert Diochon; Attendance: 8,000; Referee: Gaël Angoula |

=== Coupe de la Ligue ===
| 30 October 2019 Round of 32 | Metz | 1–1 (3–4 p) | Brest | Metz |
| 21:05 CET (UTC+1) | Niane 23' | Report | Cardona 57'; Belaud (yellow card) 89' | Stadium: Stade Saint-Symphorien; Attendance: 5,262; Referee: Jérôme Brisard |
| | Penalties |
| | Niane (penalty scored); Nguette (penalty missed); N'Doram (penalty scored); Traoré (penalty scored); Boulaya (penalty missed) | | (penalty scored) Cardona; (penalty scored) Diallo; (penalty missed) Chardonnet; (penalty scored) Court; (penalty scored) Battocchio |
