= Fabien Centonze =

French footballer (born 1996)

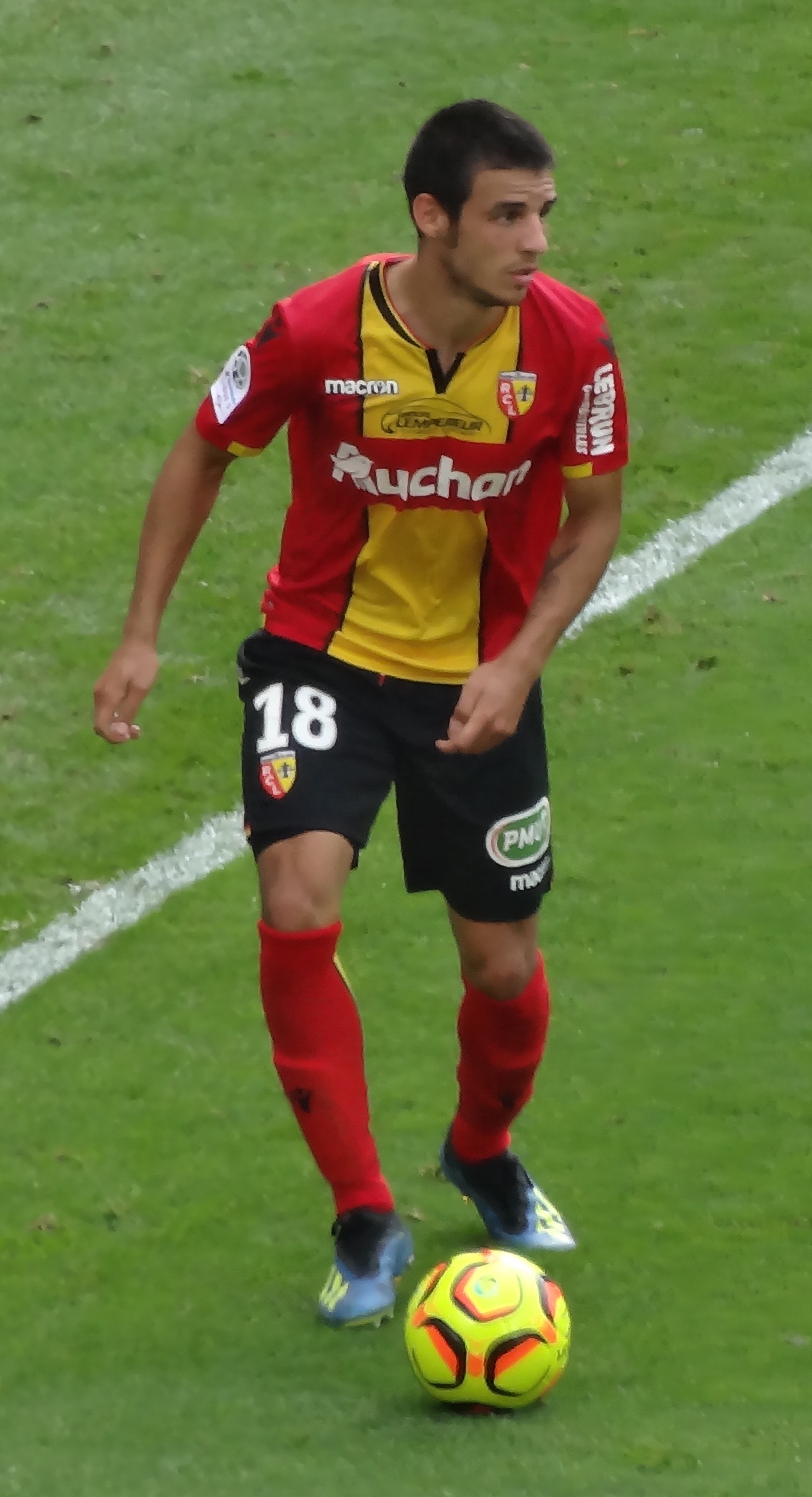
- Centonze with Lens in 2018

Personal information
- Date of birth: 16 January 1996 (age 30)
- Place of birth: Voiron, France
- Height: 1.82 m (6 ft 0 in)
- Position: Right-back

Team information
- Current team: Nantes
- Number: 18

Youth career
- –2012: Grenoble
- 2012–2015: Evian

Senior career*
Years	Team	Apps	(Gls)
2015–2016	Evian	30	(3)
2016–2018	Clermont	59	(0)
2017	Clermont B	1	(0)
2018–2019	Lens	36	(0)
2019–2022	Metz	86	(5)
2022–	Nantes	48	(3)
2024	→ Hellas Verona (loan)	10	(0)
- * Club domestic league appearances and goals as of 11 April 2026

Fabien Centonze (born 16 January 1996) is a French professional footballer who plays as a right-back for Ligue 2 club Nantes.

== Career ==
On 1 February 2024, Centonze joined Hellas Verona in Italy on loan with an option to buy.

== Career statistics ==
As of match played 11 April 2026

Appearances and goals by club, season and competition
Club	Season	League			Cup		League cup		Europe		Other		Total	
Club	Season	Division	Apps	Goals	Apps	Goals	Apps	Goals	Apps	Goals	Apps	Goals	Apps	Goals
Evian	2015–16	Ligue 2	30	3	3	0	2	1	—		—		35	4
Clermont	2016–17	Ligue 2	29	0	2	0	3	1	—		—		34	1
Clermont	2017–18	Ligue 2	30	0	1	0	1	0	—		—		32	0
Clermont	Total		59	0	3	0	4	1	—		—		66	1
Clermont B	2016–17	National 3	1	0	—		—		—		—		1	0
Lens	2018–19	Ligue 2	36	0	2	0	1	0	—		2 (Note: Appearances in Ligue 1 relegation/promotion play-offs)	0	41	0
Metz	2019–20	Ligue 1	28	0	1	0	1	0	—		—		30	0
Metz	2020–21	Ligue 1	36	1	3	1	—		—		—		39	2
Metz	2021–22	Ligue 1	19	4	0	0	—		—		—		19	4
Metz	2022–23	Ligue 2	3	0	0	0	—		—		—		3	0
Metz	Total		76	5	4	1	1	0	—		—		81	6
Nantes	2022–23	Ligue 1	23	0	5	0	—		2 (Note: Appearances in UEFA Europa League)	0	—		30	0
Nantes	2023–24	Ligue 1	3	0	2	0	—		—		—		5	0
Nantes	2024–25	Ligue 1	7	0	0	0	—		—		—		7	0
Nantes	2025–26	Ligue 1	15	3	1	0	—		—		—		16	3
Nantes	Total		48	3	8	0	—		2	0	—		58	3
Hellas Verona (loan)	2023–24	Serie A	10	0	—		—		—		—		10	0
Career total			270	11	20	1	8	2	2	0	2	0	302	20

== Honours ==
Nantes

- Coupe de France runner-up: 2022–23

Individual

- UNFP Ligue 2 Team of the Year: 2018–19
