= Dylan Bronn =

Footballer (born 1995)

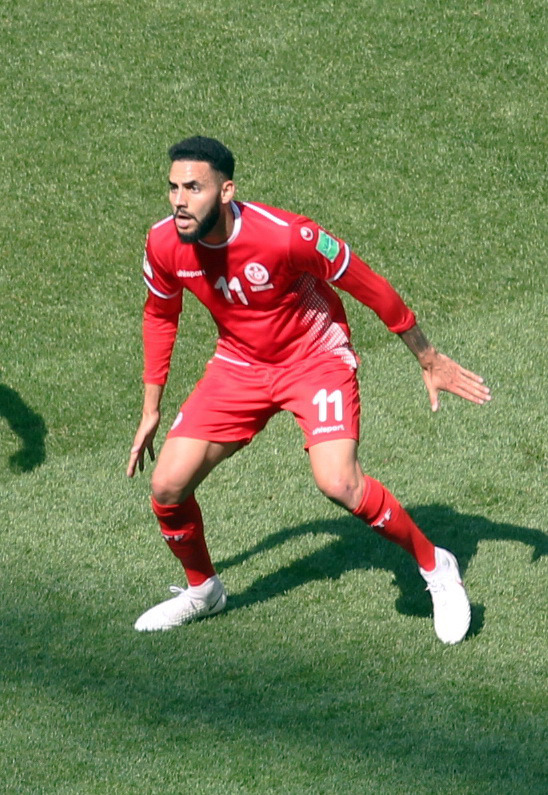
- Bronn playing with Tunisia against Belgium in 2018 FIFA World Cup

Personal information
- Full name: Dylan Daniel Mahmoud Bronn
- Date of birth: 19 June 1995 (age 31)
- Place of birth: Cannes, France
- Height: 1.86 m (6 ft 1 in)
- Position: Defender

Team information
- Current team: Servette
- Number: 25

Youth career
- 1999–2008: Cannes
- 2008–2009: ES Le Cannet-Rocheville
- 2009–2013: Cannes

Senior career*
Years	Team	Apps	(Gls)
2013–2016	Cannes	42	(4)
2016–2017	Chamois Niortais	30	(2)
2017–2019	Gent	67	(9)
2020–2022	Metz	77	(3)
2022–2025	Salernitana	52	(0)
2024	→ Servette (loan)	11	(0)
2025–	Servette	14	(0)

International career^{‡}
2017–	Tunisia	53	(2)
- * Club domestic league appearances and goals as of 14 December 2025 (UTC) ‡ National team caps and goals as of 21 June 2026 (UTC)

Dylan Daniel Mahmoud Bronn (Arabic: دِيلاَن دَانِيَال مَحْمُود بْرون; born 19 June 1995) is a professional footballer who plays as a defender for Swiss Super League club Servette. Born in France, he plays for the Tunisia national team. Before becoming professional, Bronn played in the French lower leagues with Cannes, his hometown club.

== Club career ==
Bronn was signed by Niort in the summer of 2016, initially as a reserve team player on an amateur contract. However, first team manager Denis Renaud gave Bronn the chance to play in three of the side's pre-season friendly matches. His performances in these games led Renaud to hand Bronn his professional debut on 29 July 2016 in the 0–0 draw with RC Lens on the first matchday of the year at the Stade René Gaillard. Over the course of the 2016–17 season, he became a regular starter for the first team, forming a central defensive partnership with Jérémy Choplin. On 18 October 2016, Bronn was given a three-year professional contract by Niort.

Bronn joined Belgian First Division A side K.A.A. Gent in 2017. He was elected best player of the season of KAA Gent for the 2018–19 season.

He joined FC Metz in 2020.

On 12 August 2022, Bronn signed a three-year contract with Salernitana in Italy. On 14 February 2024, Bronn was loaned by Servette in Switzerland.

== International career ==
Bronn was born in France, and is Tunisian by descent through his mother, and German through his father. Bronn was called up to the Tunisia national team in March 2017. He won his first cap for Tunisia in a friendly match against Morocco on 28 March 2017, playing the whole match in a 1–0 defeat.

In June 2018 he was named in Tunisia's final 23-man squad for the 2018 World Cup in Russia.

On 15 May 2026, Bronn was named in the Tunisia squad for the 2026 FIFA World Cup.

== Career statistics ==
=== Club ===
As of match played 14 December 2025

Appearances and goals by club, season and competition
Club	Season	League			National cup (Note: Includes Coupe de France, Belgian Cup, Coppa Italia, Swiss Cup)		League cup		Continental		Other		Total	
Club	Season	Division	Apps	Goals	Apps	Goals	Apps	Goals	Apps	Goals	Apps	Goals	Apps	Goals
Chamois Niortais	2016–17	Ligue 2	30	2	5	0	0	0	—		—		35	2
Gent	2017–18	Belgian First Division A	24	2	3	0	—		0	0	10	0	37	2
Gent	2018–19	Belgian First Division A	19	7	5	1	—		0	0	9	0	33	8
Gent	2019–20	Belgian First Division A	5	0	1	0	—		1 (Note: Appearance in UEFA Europa League)	0	0	0	7	0
Gent	Total		48	9	9	1	—		1	0	19	0	77	10
Metz	2019–20	Ligue 1	9	0	1	0	0	0	—		—		10	0
Metz	2020–21	Ligue 1	38	2	1	0	0	0	—		—		39	2
Metz	2021–22	Ligue 1	30	1	0	0	0	0	—		—		30	1
Metz	Total		77	3	2	0	0	0	—		—		79	3
Salernitana	2022–23	Serie A	24	0	0	0	—		—		—		24	0
Salernitana	2023–24	Serie A	4	0	2	0	—		—		—		6	0
Salernitana	2024–25	Serie B	24	0	1	0	—		—		—		25	0
Salernitana	Total		52	0	3	0	—		—		—		55	0
Servette (loan)	2023–24	Swiss Super League	11	0	2	0	—		—		—		13	0
Servette	2025–26	Swiss Super League	14	0	2	1	—		6 (Note: Two appearances in UEFA Champions League, two appearances in UEFA Europa League, two appearances in UEFA Conference League)	0	—		22	1
Servette	2026–27	Swiss Super League	0	0	0	0	—		—		—		0	0
Servette	Total		14	0	2	1	—		6	0	—		22	1
Career total			232	14	23	2	0	0	7	0	19	0	281	16

=== International ===
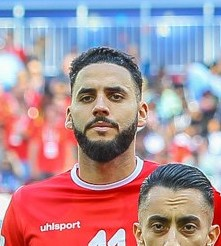
Bronn lining up with Tunisia at the 2018 FIFA World Cup

As of match played 20 June 2026

Appearances and goals by national team and year
National team	Year	Apps	Goals
Tunisia	2017	1	0
Tunisia	2018	9	1
Tunisia	2019	10	0
Tunisia	2020	4	0
Tunisia	2021	9	1
Tunisia	2022	5	0
Tunisia	2024	2	0
Tunisia	2025	10	0
Tunisia	2026	3	0
Total		53	2

Scores and results list Tunisia's goal tally first, score column indicates score after each Bronn goal.

List of international goals scored by Dylan Bronn
No.	Date	Venue	Opponent	Score	Result	Competition
1	23 June 2018	Otkritie Arena, Moscow, Russia	Belgium	1–2	2–5	2018 FIFA World Cup
2	3 September 2021	Stade Olympique de Radès, Radès, Tunisia	Equatorial Guinea	1–0	3–0	2022 FIFA World Cup Qualification

== Honours ==
Servette

- Swiss Cup: 2023–24
