= Habib Diallo =

Senegalese footballer (born 1995)

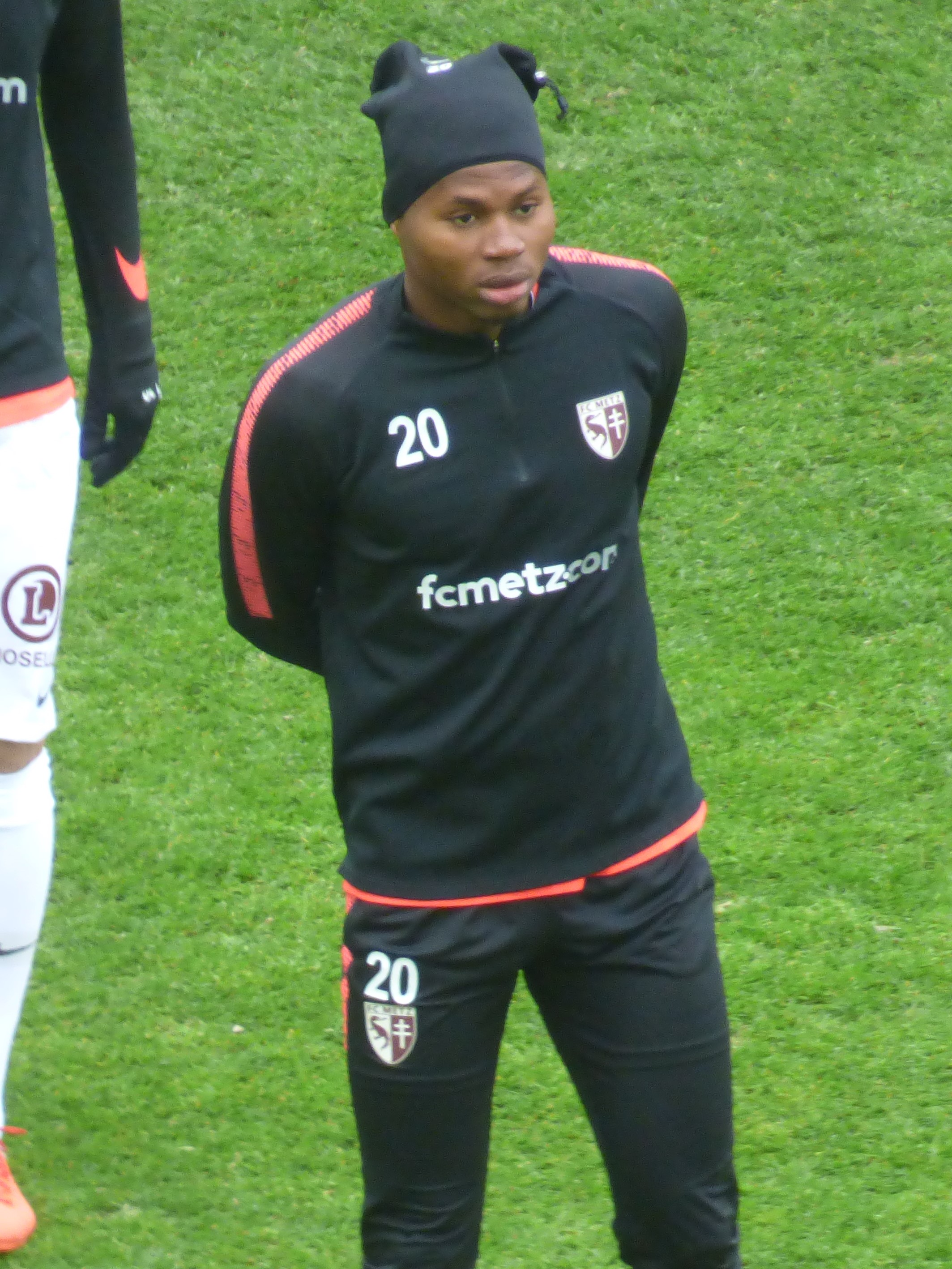
- Diallo with Metz in 2019

Personal information
- Full name: Mouhamadou Habibou Diallo
- Date of birth: 18 June 1995 (age 31)
- Place of birth: Thiès, Senegal
- Height: 1.86 m (6 ft 1 in)
- Position: Forward

Team information
- Current team: Le Mans
- Number: 30

Senior career*
Years	Team	Apps	(Gls)
2014–2017	Metz B	29	(4)
2015–2020	Metz	104	(48)
2017–2018	→ Brest (loan)	50	(16)
2020–2023	Strasbourg	100	(40)
2023–2025	Al-Shabab	30	(6)
2024–2025	→ Damac (loan)	27	(7)
2025–2026	Metz	27	(4)
2026–	Le Mans	1	(0)

International career^{‡}
2015	Senegal U23	4	(2)
2018–	Senegal	41	(9)
Medal record
Representing Senegal
Men's football
Africa Cup of Nations
Winner	2021 Cameroon
Runner-up	2025 Morocco
- * Club domestic league appearances and goals as of 5 September 2026 ‡ National team caps and goals as of 31 March 2026

Mouhamadou Habibou "Habib" Diallo (born 18 June 1995) is a Senegalese professional footballer who plays as a forward for Ligue 1 club Le Mans and the Senegal national team.

== Club career ==
=== Metz ===
In the summer of 2015, Diallo was promoted to the senior team at Metz. He played 17 games in his debut season with the club, scoring 9 times. He appeared in 19 matches for Metz during the 2016–17 Ligue 1 season, scoring once. In January 2017, he was sent out on loan to Brest for the remainder of the season after falling out of favour with new manager Frédéric Hantz. Diallo had a successful time in Brittany, playing 16 times and scoring 7 goals. He went back on loan to Brest in the summer 2017 under the management of Jean-Marc Furlan. He spent the entire season there as Brest finished 5th and he scored 9 goals in 33 games in Ligue 2.

After returning from his loan, Diallo had a prolific season with Metz, winning the Ligue 2 title and scoring 26 league goals in 37 games in the process, only bettered by Gaëtan Charbonnier who played for Diallo's old club Brest, scoring 27 times. Diallo was included in the year-end UNFP Ligue 2 Team of the Season squad alongside 6 of his Metz teammates.

Diallo immediately got up to life in Ligue 1, scoring 6 times in his first 8 matches. In the January window he was subject to interest and a reported bid from Premier League club Chelsea, but no move materialised. By the time the Ligue 1 was suspended in March 2020 due to the coronavirus pandemic, Diallo had contributed 12 goals with Metz sitting in 15th position in the table.

=== Strasbourg ===
On 5 October 2020, Diallo signed a five-year contract with Strasbourg for a fee of 10 million euros plus bonuses, making it the most expensive transfer in the club’s history. The move was poorly received by some Metz supporters, long-standing rivals of Strasbourg, who vandalized their club’s headquarters in retaliation.

He made his debut on 18 October, replacing Lionel Carole before halftime in a Ligue 1 home match against Olympique Lyonnais. Trailing 3–0, Strasbourg came back to 3–2, notably thanks to a goal from the Senegalese striker, who scored shortly after coming on.

=== Al-Shabab ===
On 14 August 2023, Diallo joined Saudi Pro League club Al-Shabab for a club record €20 million.

==== Damac (loan) ====
On 26 August 2024, Diallo joined Saudi Pro League club Damac on loan. Who chose against signing him permanently not wanting a fee installment.

=== Return to Metz ===
On 31 August 2025, Diallo signed a three-year contract with Metz, newly promoted to Ligue 1.

He missed the chance to score his first goal in his debut match against Angers SCO on 14 September 2025, failing to convert a penalty. In the following match, this time against AS Monaco, Diallo scored his first goal since returning to Metz with a low angled shot after receiving a pass from Cheikh Sabaly.

=== Le Mans ===
Following Metz's relegation, on 1 September 2026, Diallo signed a three-season contract with Le Mans.

== International career ==
Diallo made his debut for Senegal on 17 November 2018 in an Africa Cup of Nations qualifier against Equatorial Guinea, as a 55th-minute substitute for M'Baye Niang.

Diallo was part of Senegal's squad for the 2021 Africa Cup of Nations; the Lions of Teranga went on to win the tournament for the first time in their history.

He was appointed a Grand Officer of the National Order of the Lion by President of Senegal Macky Sall following the nation's victory at the tournament.

In December 2023, Diallo was named in Senegal's squad for the postponed 2023 Africa Cup of Nations held in the Ivory Coast.

== Career statistics ==
=== Club ===
As of match played 10 May 2026

Appearances and goals by club, season and competition
Club	Season	League			National cup (Note: Includes Coupe de France, King's Cup)		League cup (Note: Includes Coupe de la Ligue)		Total	
Club	Season	Division	Apps	Goals	Apps	Goals	Apps	Goals	Apps	Goals
Metz B	2013–14	CFA 2	5	0	—		—		5	0
Metz B	2014–15	CFA	18	1	—		—		18	1
Metz B	2015–16	CFA 2	5	2	—		—		5	2
Metz B	2016–17	CFA 2	1	1	—		—		1	1
Metz B	Total		29	4	—		—		29	4
Metz	2015–16	Ligue 2	17	9	0	0	1	0	18	9
Metz	2016–17	Ligue 1	19	1	1	0	3	0	23	1
Metz	2017–18	Ligue 1	1	0	0	0	0	0	1	0
Metz	2018–19	Ligue 2	37	26	2	0	3	0	42	26
Metz	2019–20	Ligue 1	26	12	1	0	0	0	27	12
Metz	2020–21	Ligue 1	4	0	0	0	—		4	0
Metz	Total		104	48	4	0	7	0	115	48
Brest (loan)	2016–17	Ligue 2	16	7	0	0	0	0	16	7
Brest (loan)	2017–18	Ligue 2	34	9	2	2	0	0	36	11
Brest (loan)	Total		50	16	2	2	0	0	52	18
Strasbourg	2020–21	Ligue 1	32	9	0	0	—		32	9
Strasbourg	2021–22	Ligue 1	31	11	2	1	—		33	12
Strasbourg	2022–23	Ligue 1	37	20	1	0	—		38	20
Strasbourg	Total		100	40	3	1	—		103	41
Al-Shabab	2023–24	Saudi Pro League	30	6	3	0	—		33	6
Damac (loan)	2024–25	Saudi Pro League	27	7	1	0	—		28	7
Metz	2025–26	Ligue 1	25	4	0	0	—		25	4
Career total			349	123	10	3	7	0	366	126

=== International ===
As of match played 31 March 2026

Appearances and goals by national team and year
National team	Year	Apps	Goals
Senegal	2018	1	0
Senegal	2019	3	1
Senegal	2020	2	0
Senegal	2021	4	1
Senegal	2022	4	0
Senegal	2023	7	2
Senegal	2024	14	3
Senegal	2025	4	2
Senegal	2026	2	0
Total		41	9

Scores and results list Senegal's goal tally first.

List of international goals scored by Habib Diallo
No.	Date	Venue	Opponent	Score	Result	Competition
1.	13 November 2019	Stade Lat-Dior, Thiès, Senegal	Congo	2–0	2–0	2021 Africa Cup of Nations qualification
2.	11 November 2021	Stade de Kégué, Lomé, Togo	Togo	1–1	1–1	2022 FIFA World Cup qualification
3.	24 March 2023	Diamniadio Olympic Stadium, Dakar, Senegal	Mozambique	5–1	5–1	2023 Africa Cup of Nations qualification
4.	20 June 2023	Estádio José Alvalade, Lisbon, Portugal	Brazil	1–1	4–2	Friendly
5.	19 January 2024	Charles Konan Banny Stadium, Yamoussoukro, Ivory Coast	Cameroon	2–0	3–1	2023 Africa Cup of Nations
6.	29 January 2024	Charles Konan Banny Stadium, Yamoussoukro, Ivory Coast	Ivory Coast	1–0	1–1 (a.e.t.)	2023 Africa Cup of Nations
7.	9 June 2024	Cheikha Ould Boïdiya Stadium, Nouakchott, Mauritania	Mauritania	1–0	1–0	2026 FIFA World Cup qualification
8.	14 October 2025	Diamniadio Olympic Stadium, Diamniadio, Senegal	Mauritania	4–0	4–0	2026 FIFA World Cup qualification
9.	30 December 2025	Tangier Grand Stadium, Tangier, Morocco	Benin	2–0	3–0	2025 Africa Cup of Nations

== Honours ==
Metz

- Ligue 2: 2018–19

Senegal

- Africa Cup of Nations: 2021

Individual

- UNFP Ligue 2 Team of the Season: 2018–19
- UNFP Ligue 2 Player of the Month: August 2018

Orders

- Grand Officer of the National Order of the Lion: 2022
