= Thomas Delaine =

French professional footballer (born 1992)

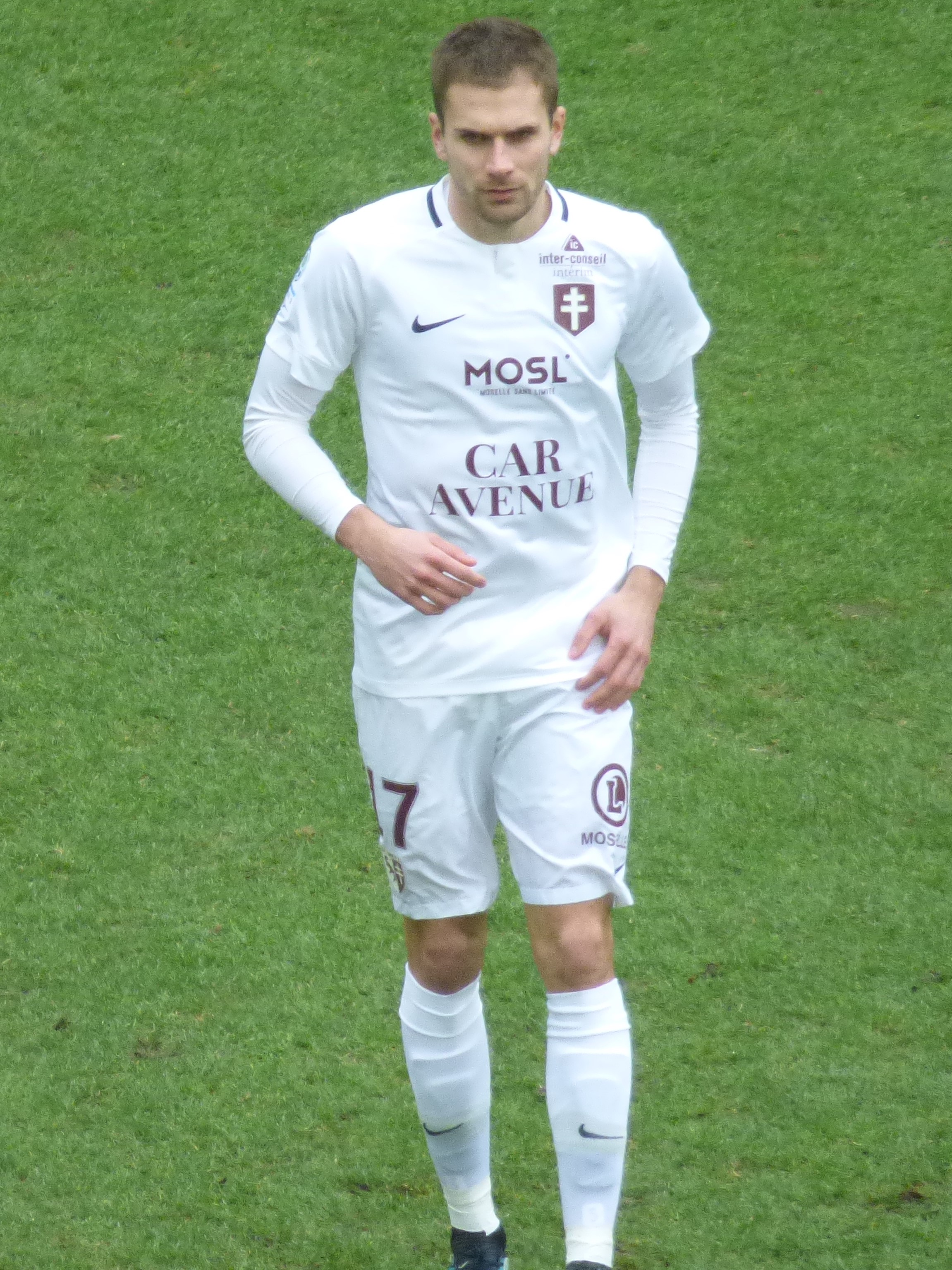
- Delaine in 2019

Personal information
- Date of birth: 24 March 1992 (age 34)
- Place of birth: Lens, France
- Height: 1.80 m (5 ft 11 in)
- Position: Defender

Youth career
- 2001–2010: Lens

Senior career*
Years	Team	Apps	(Gls)
2010–2015	Lens II	103	(10)
2015–2017	Arras	55	(0)
2017–2018	Paris FC	40	(0)
2018–2022	Metz	101	(4)
2022–2025	Strasbourg	46	(1)
2025–2026	Le Havre	5	(0)
- * Club domestic league appearances and goals as of 4 January 2026

Thomas Delaine (born 24 March 1992) is a French professional footballer who plays as a defender.

== Club career ==
Delaine spent years in the lower divisions of France and considered quitting football for a career in gardening, before signing his first professional contract with Paris FC in the Ligue 2. Delaine made his professional debut with Paris FC in a Ligue 2 0–0 tie with Clermont Foot on 28 July 2017.

On 25 May 2022, Delaine signed a three-year deal with Strasbourg.

On 13 July 2025, Delaine moved to Le Havre on a two-year contract. On 9 January 2026, he left Le Havre by mutual consent.

== Career statistics ==
As of match played 21 December 2025

Appearances and goals by club, season and competition
Club	Season	League			National Cup		League Cup		Other		Total	
Club	Season	Division	Apps	Goals	Apps	Goals	Apps	Goals	Apps	Goals	Apps	Goals
Lens II	2013–14	Championnat National 2	19	2	—		—		—		19	2
Lens II	2014–15	Championnat National 2	19	1	—		—		—		19	1
Lens II	2015–16	Championnat National 2	26	0	—		—		—		26	0
Lens II	2016–17	Championnat National 2	29	0	—		—		—		29	0
Lens II	Total		93	3	—		—		—		93	3
Arras	2015–16	Championnat National	26	0	—		—		—		26	0
Arras	2016–17	Championnat National	29	0	—		—		—		29	0
Arras	Total		55	0	—		—		—		55	0
Paris FC	2017–18	Ligue 2	36	0	2	0	0	0	—		38	0
Paris FC	2018–19	Ligue 2	4	0	0	0	1	0	—		5	0
Paris FC	Total		40	0	2	0	1	0	—		43	0
Metz	2018–19	Ligue 2	36	0	2	0	0	0	0	0	39	0
Metz	2019–20	Ligue 1	16	0	1	0	0	0	0	0	17	0
Metz	2020–21	Ligue 1	24	3	3	0	—		0	0	28	3
Metz	2021–22	Ligue 1	29	1	0	0	—		0	0	29	1
Metz	Total		101	4	6	0	—		0	0	107	4
Strasbourg	2022–23	Ligue 1	17	0	0	0	—		0	0	17	0
Strasbourg	2023–24	Ligue 1	27	1	2	0	—		0	0	29	1
Strasbourg	2024–25	Ligue 1	2	0	0	0	—		—		2	0
Strasbourg	Total		46	1	2	0	—		0	0	48	1
Le Havre	2025–26	Ligue 1	5	0	1	0	—		—		0	
Career total			340	8	11	0	1	0	0	0	352	8
