= Ernest Boahene =

Ghanaian footballer

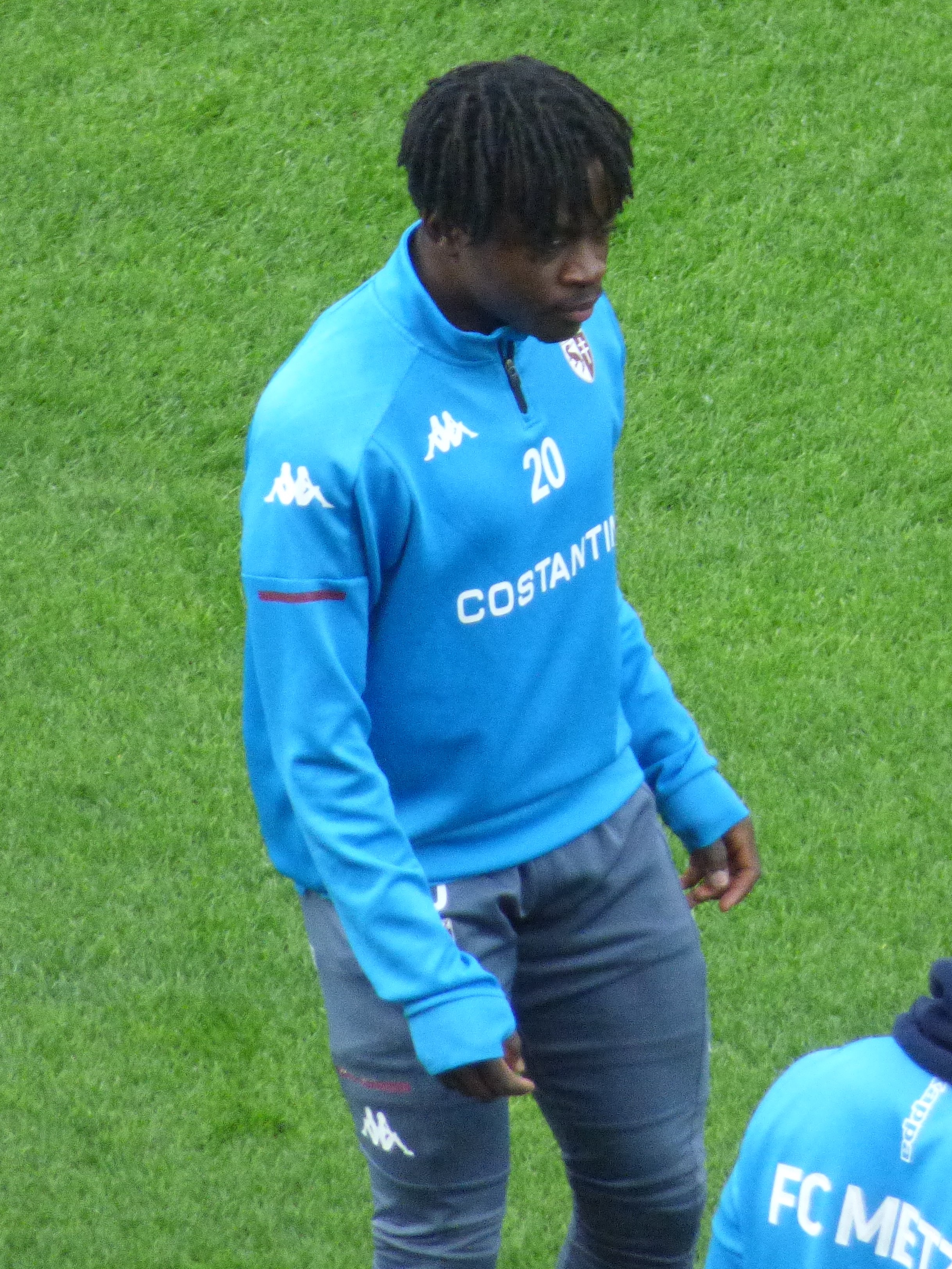
- Boahene with Metz in 2021

Personal information
- Date of birth: 6 March 2000 (age 26)
- Place of birth: Accra, Ghana
- Height: 1.72 m (5 ft 8 in)
- Position: Right-back

Youth career
- 2014–2020: Rainbow FC

Senior career*
Years	Team	Apps	(Gls)
2019–2020	→ Paris FC (loan)	2	(0)
2019–2020	→ Paris FC B (loan)	2	(0)
2020–2021	Metz	0	(0)
2022–2025	Strømsgodset	15	(1)
2025	Gamle Oslo	1	(1)
- * Club domestic league appearances and goals as of 1 January 2026

Ernest Boahene (born 6 March 2000) is a Ghanaian professional footballer who plays as a right-back.

== Career ==
On 26 August 2019, Boahene joined Paris FC from Ghana. He made his professional debut with Paris FC in a 3–0 Ligue 2 loss to Chambly on 2 September 2019.

He played once in 2025 for Gamle Oslo FK.
