= Habib Maïga =

Ivorian footballer (born 1996)

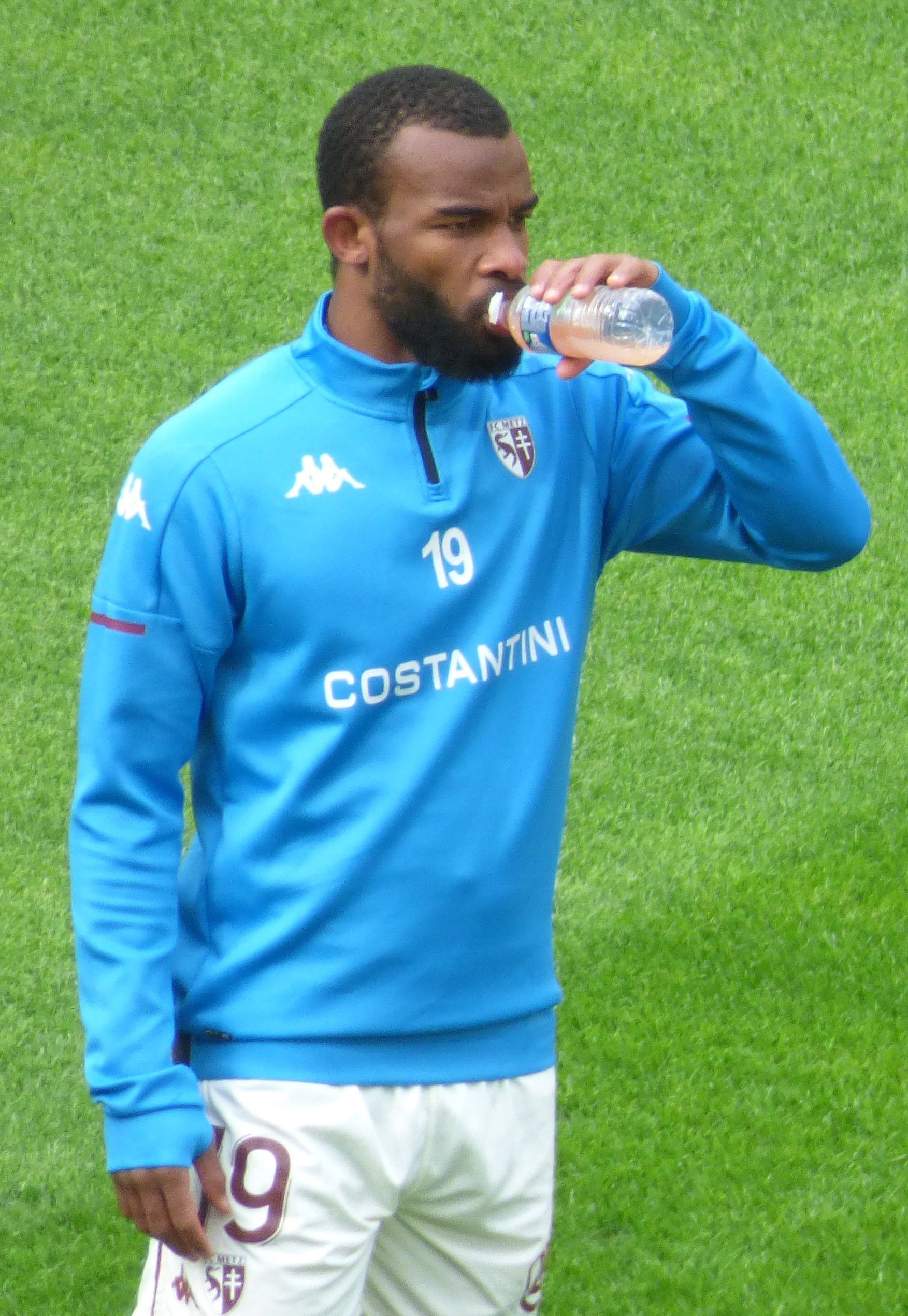
- Maïga with Metz in 2021

Personal information
- Full name: Habib Digbo G'nampa Maïga
- Date of birth: 1 January 1996 (age 30)
- Place of birth: Gagnoa, Ivory Coast
- Height: 1.81 m (5 ft 11 in)
- Position: Midfielder

Team information
- Current team: Ferencváros
- Number: 80

Youth career
- –2015: Saint-Étienne

Senior career*
Years	Team	Apps	(Gls)
2015–2017	Saint-Étienne II	16	(0)
2017–2019	Saint-Étienne	18	(1)
2018	→ Arsenal Tula (loan)	1	(0)
2018–2019	→ Metz (loan)	16	(2)
2019–2024	Metz	115	(5)
2024–	Ferencváros	48	(6)

International career^{‡}
2013	Ivory Coast U17	5	(0)
2015	Ivory Coast U23	4	(0)
2019–2022	Ivory Coast	13	(0)
- * Club domestic league appearances and goals as of 10 November 2026 ‡ National team caps and goals as of 30 April 2026

Habib Digbo G'nampa Maïga (born 1 January 1996) is an Ivorian professional footballer who plays as a midfielder for Hungarian club Ferencváros and the Ivory Coast national team.

== Club career ==
=== Saint-Étienne ===
Having come through the second team ranks, Maïga made his debut for the Ligue 1 side on 4 March 2017 against Bastia. He played the whole match in a 0–0 away draw. He scored his first goal for 'Les verts' on 14 October 2017 when he came on as a late substitute against FC Metz and sealed a 3–1 win in the 95th minute.

=== Loan to Arsenal Tula ===
On 21 February 2018, he joined Russian club FC Arsenal Tula on loan until the end of the 2017–18 season.

=== Metz ===
On 10 June 2018, Maïga returned to France joining Ligue 2 club FC Metz for a one-year loan with an obligation to buy. During the 2018–19 season, Maïga and Metz won the French Ligue 2 and were promoted to Ligue 1.

In June 2019 it was confirmed, that Metz had activated the option to buy the player on permanent basis for €1 million.

=== Ferencváros ===
On 4 January 2024, Maïga was signed by Hungarian club Ferencváros for a signing fee of €400 thousand.

On 20 April 2024, the Ferencváros–Kisvárda tie ended with a goalless draw at the Groupama Aréna on the 29th match day of the 2023–24 Nemzeti Bajnokság I season which meant that Ferencváros won their 35th championship.

On 15 May 2024, Ferencváros were defeated by Paks 2–0 in the 2024 Magyar Kupa Final at the Puskás Aréna. On 9 May 2026, he won the 2025–26 Magyar Kupa season with Ferencváros by beating Zalaegerszegi TE 1–0 in the 2026 Magyar Kupa final at Puskás Aréna.

== International career ==
Maïga was called up to the senior Ivory Coast squad for a World Cup qualifier against Morocco in November 2017.

He made his debut on 6 September 2019 in a friendly against Benin, as a starter.

== Career statistics ==
=== Club ===
As of 8 April 2025

Appearances and goals by club, season and competition
Club	Season	League			National cup		League cup		Europe		Other		Total	
Club	Season	Division	Apps	Goals	Apps	Goals	Apps	Goals	Apps	Goals	Apps	Goals	Apps	Goals
Saint-Étienne	2016–17	Ligue 1	5	0	0	0	0	0	0	0	—		5	0
Saint-Étienne	2017–18	Ligue 1	13	1	0	0	0	0	—		—		13	1
Saint-Étienne	Total		18	1	0	0	0	0	0	0	—		18	1
Arsenal Tula (loan)	2017–18	Russian Premier League	1	0	—		—		—		—		1	0
Metz (loan)	2018–19	Ligue 2	16	2	5	0	1	0	—		—		22	2
Metz	2019–20	Ligue 1	26	1	0	0	1	0	—		—		27	1
Metz	2020–21	Ligue 1	31	1	3	0	—		—		—		34	1
Metz	2021–22	Ligue 1	17	2	0	0	—		—		—		17	2
Metz	2022–23	Ligue 2	31	1	2	0	—		—		—		33	1
Metz	2023–24	Ligue 1	7	0	0	0	—		—		—		7	0
Metz	Total		112	5	5	0	1	0	—		—		118	5
Ferencváros	2023–24	Nemzeti Bajnokság I	14	1	4	0	—		2	0	—		20	1
Ferencváros	2024–25	Nemzeti Bajnokság I	20	2	2	0	—		13	0	—		35	2
Ferencváros	Total		34	3	6	0	—		15	0	—		55	3
Career total			181	11	17	1	2	0	15	0	0	0	215	12

== Honours ==
Ferencváros

- Hungarian Cup: 2025–26
