= Victorien Angban =

Ivorian footballer (born 1996)

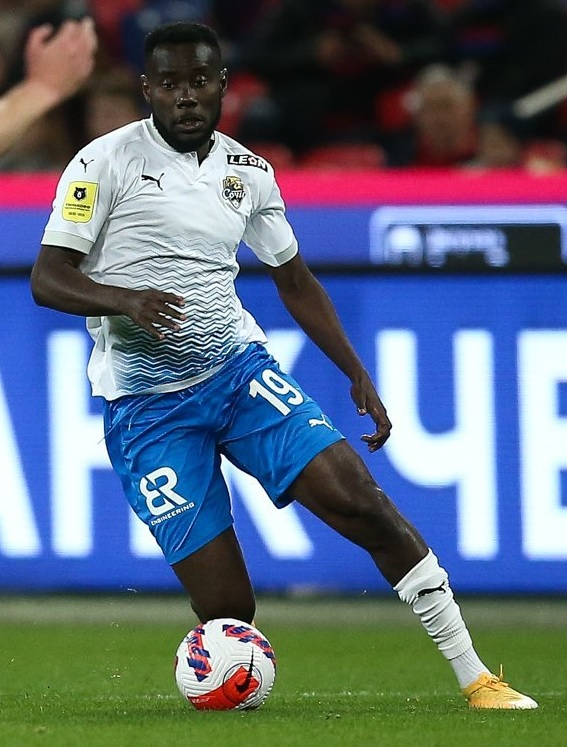
- Angban with Sochi in 2022

Personal information
- Full name: Bekanty Victorien Angban
- Date of birth: 29 September 1996 (age 30)
- Place of birth: Abidjan, Ivory Coast
- Height: 1.80 m (5 ft 11 in)
- Position: Midfielder

Team information
- Current team: BATE Borisov
- Number: 7

Youth career
- 2010–2012: Stade d'Abidjan
- 2012–2015: Chelsea

Senior career*
Years	Team	Apps	(Gls)
2015–2019	Chelsea	0	(0)
2015–2016	→ Sint-Truiden (loan)	23	(0)
2016–2017	→ Granada (loan)	10	(0)
2017–2018	→ Waasland-Beveren (loan)	25	(1)
2018–2019	→ Metz (loan)	27	(1)
2019–2021	Metz	46	(0)
2021–2025	Sochi	38	(1)
2024–2025	→ Dynamo Makhachkala (loan)	5	(0)
2026–	BATE Borisov	7	(0)

International career^{‡}
2013–2014	Ivory Coast U17	4	(0)
2015	Ivory Coast U20	2	(1)
2015–	Ivory Coast	10	(0)
- * Club domestic league appearances and goals as of 6 July 2026 ‡ National team caps and goals as of 06:00, 24 August 2019 (UTC)

Bekanty Victorien Angban (born 29 September 1996) is an Ivorian footballer who plays as a defensive midfielder for BATE Borisov.

== Club career ==
=== Chelsea ===
In 2012, Angban joined Chelsea from Stade d'Abidjan as a trialist. He only officially signed for Chelsea in 2015, after he was able to obtain a work permit after spending three years in the country.

==== Loan to Sint-Truiden ====
On 14 July 2015, it was announced that Angban would spend the season on loan at Belgian club Sint-Truiden. On 24 July 2015, he made his professional debut as a 64th-minute substitute in a 2–1 victory over Club Brugge in their first game of the season. Angban made his first start for the team on 8 August, against Oostende which ended in a 1–1 draw. On 27 September 2015, Angban was sent off in the 79th minute, in a 1–0 loss against Anderlecht. On 29 January 2016, he was again sent off in a match against Anderlecht in the closing minutes of a 2–1 loss. On 5 March 2016, Angban was sent off for the third time, then in a match against Club Brugge after picking up two yellows; the match ended in a 3–0 loss for Sint-Truiden. At the end of the season, Angban picked up a total of 8 yellow cards and was sent off a total of 3 times.

==== Loan to Granada ====
On 22 July 2016, it was announced that Angban would be joining Spanish side Granada on loan for the season. He is the second Chelsea player to join Granada on loan, with the first being Jérémie Boga. On 16 September 2016, he made his debut in a 2–2 draw against Real Betis.

==== Loan to Waasland-Beveren ====
On 28 July 2017, it was announced that Angban would be joining Belgian side Beveren on loan for the season.

==== Loan to Metz ====
In July 2018, it was announced that Angban would be joining FC Metz in French Ligue 2 on loan for the season.

=== Metz ===
In April 2019, it was revealed that Metz had exercised the promotion clause in Angban's contract, and he joined the club in a €6 million deal.

=== Sochi ===
On 3 July 2021, he joined Russian Premier League club Sochi. On 30 May 2023, Angban extended his contract with Sochi to June 2026.

On 27 June 2024, Angban moved on loan to Dynamo Makhachkala.

On 21 August 2025, Angban left Sochi.

== International career ==
Angban has represented Ivory Coast at U17 level and scored at the 2015 African Under-20 Championship finals. On 2 October 2015, he received his first senior Ivory Coast call up by manager Michel Dussuyer as they took on Morocco in a friendly. He was named in the senior Ivory Coast squad for the 2019 Africa Cup of Nations.

== Personal life ==
Angban was born on 29 September 1996, in Abidjan. His older brother, Vincent, is a former professional footballer who played as a goalkeeper.

== Career statistics ==
As of match played 6 July 2026.

Appearances and goals by club, season and competition
Club	Season	League			National Cup		League Cup		Europe		Other		Total	
Club	Season	Division	Apps	Goals	Apps	Goals	Apps	Goals	Apps	Goals	Apps	Goals	Apps	Goals
Sint-Truiden (loan)	2015–16	Belgian Pro League	23	0	0	0	—		—		—		23	0
Granada (loan)	2016–17	La Liga	10	0	1	0	—		—		—		11	0
Waasland-Beveren (loan)	2017–18	Belgian Pro League	25	1	2	0	—		—		6 (Note: Appearances in Belgian First Division A European play-offs)	0	33	1
Metz (loan)	2018–19	Ligue 2	27	1	4	0	2	0	—		—		33	1
Metz	2019–20	Ligue 1	20	0	1	0	1	0	—		—		22	0
Metz	2020–21	Ligue 1	21	0	0	0	0	0	—		—		21	0
Metz	Total		41	0	1	0	1	0	—		—		43	0
Sochi	2021–22	Russian Premier League	24	1	1	0	—		4 (Note: Appearances in UEFA Europa Conference League)	0	—		29	1
Sochi	2022–23	Russian Premier League	7	0	0	0	—		—		—		7	0
Sochi	2023–24	Russian Premier League	7	0	4	0	—		—		—		11	0
Sochi	Total		38	1	5	0	0	0	4	0	—		47	1
Dynamo Makhachkala	2024–25	Russian Premier League	5	0	4	0	—		—		—		9	0
BATE Borisov	2026	Russian Premier League	7	0	1	0	—		—		—		8	0
Career total			176	3	18	0	3	0	4	0	6	0	207	3

== Honours ==
Metz

- Ligue 2: 2018–19
