= Vagner Gonçalves (Cape Verdean footballer) =

Cape Verdean footballer

Vagner
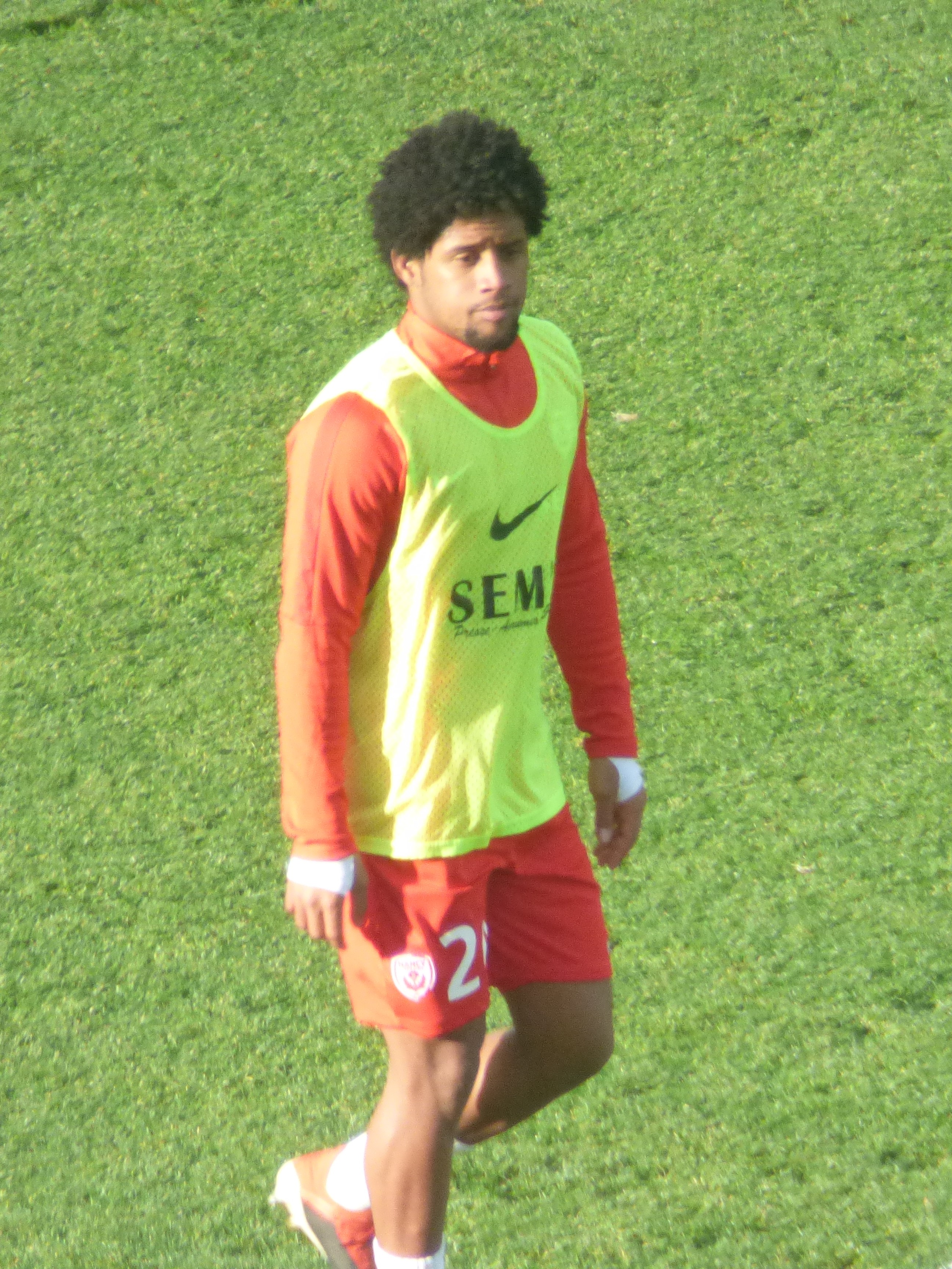
- Vagner in 2019

Personal information
- Full name: Vagner José Dias Gonçalves
- Date of birth: 19 July 1994 (age 32)
- Place of birth: Mindelo, Cape Verde
- Height: 1.69 m (5 ft 7 in)
- Position: Forward

Team information
- Current team: Amazonas

Youth career
- 2013–2015: Gil Vicente
- 2016–2017: Saint-Étienne

Senior career*
Years	Team	Apps	(Gls)
2015–2016	Gil Vicente	25	(2)
2017–2020	Saint-Étienne II	25	(11)
2017–2020	Saint-Étienne	4	(0)
2019	→ Nancy (loan)	18	(6)
2019–2020	→ Nancy (loan)	15	(7)
2020–2023	Metz	34	(4)
2021–2022	→ Sion (loan)	3	(0)
2022–2023	→ Seraing (loan)	23	(4)
2024–2025	Radomiak Radom	21	(2)
2025–	Amazonas	0	(0)

International career
2018–2022	Cape Verde	10	(1)
- * Club domestic league appearances and goals as of 15:55, 8 January 2025 (UTC)

Vagner José Dias Gonçalves (born 19 Juillet 1994), or simply Vagner, is a Cape Verdean professional footballer who plays as a forward for Brazilian club Amazonas.

== Club career ==
On 13 January 2015, Vagner made his professional debut with Gil Vicente in a 2014–15 Taça da Liga match against Estoril Praia.

In July 2020, Vagner joined Ligue 1 side Metz from Saint-Étienne after playing for Nancy in Ligue 2 from January 2019. He signed a four-year contract while Saint-Étienne reportedly received a transfer fee of €3 million plus bonuses.

On 29 August 2021, he joined FC Sion in Switzerland on a season-long loan with an option to buy.

On 6 September 2022, Vagner moved on a new loan to Seraing in the Belgian Pro League.

On 2 September 2023, Vagner's contract with Metz was terminated by mutual consent.

On 10 January 2024, Vagner signed a two-and-a-half-year deal with Ekstraklasa club Radomiak Radom. He made his first-team debut on 10 February 2024, appearing for the first 45 minutes of a 6–0 away loss to Cracovia. In December 2024, he was suspended by the club after a physical altercation with teammate Rafał Wolski during a training session. On 8 January 2025, Radomiak terminated Vagner's contract.

On 5 June, Vagner joined Brazilian Série B club Amazonas.

== International career ==
Vagner made his professional for the Cape Verde national team in a 3–2 friendly win over Algeria on 1 June 2019.

He was named in the roster for the 2021 Africa Cup of Nations where his team reached the round of 16.

=== International goals ===
Scores and results list Cape Verde's goal tally first, score column indicates score after each Vagner goal.

List of international goals scored by Vagner
No.	Date	Venue	Opponent	Score	Result	Competition
1	10 October 2019	Stade Parsemain, Fos-sur-Mer, France	Togo	2–1	2–1	Friendly
