= Opa Nguette =

Footballer (born 1994)

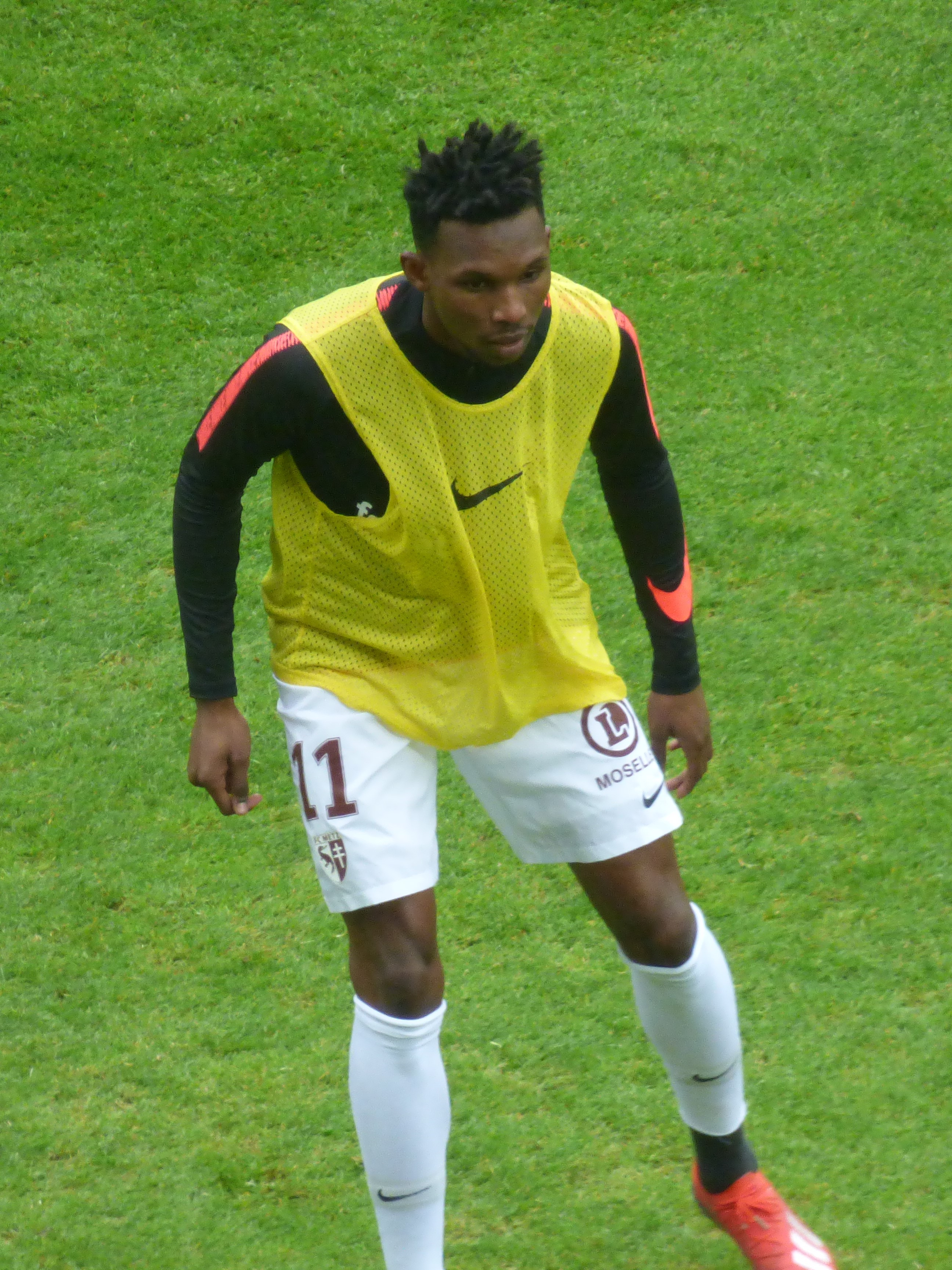
- Nguette in 2019

Personal information
- Date of birth: 8 July 1994 (age 32)
- Place of birth: Mantes-la-Jolie, France
- Height: 1.82 m (6 ft 0 in)
- Positions: Attacking midfielder; striker

Team information
- Current team: Mağusa Türk Gücü

Youth career
- 2006–2011: Mantes
- 2011–2012: Valenciennes

Senior career*
Years	Team	Apps	(Gls)
2011	Mantes	1	(0)
2012–2016	Valenciennes	66	(8)
2016–2022	Metz	151	(19)
2022–2023	Baniyas	24	(2)
2024–	Mağusa Türk Gücü	0	(0)

International career^{‡}
2012	France U18	2	(0)
2012–2013	France U19	8	(1)
2013–2014	France U20	3	(1)
2017–	Senegal	10	(2)
- * Club domestic league appearances and goals as of 21 May 2022 ‡ National team caps and goals as of 20:38, 14 November 2021 (UTC)

Opa Nguette (born 8 July 1994) is a professional footballer who plays for KTFF Süper Lig club Mağusa Türk Gücü and the Senegal national team. He plays as an attacking midfielder and striker. Nguette was a France youth international, having represented his nation at under-18 to under-20 level, before switching allegiance to Senegal.

== Club career ==
Nguette began his football career playing for hometown club Mantes at amateur level in the Championnat de France amateur, the fourth level of French football. In the 2011–12 season, he made his competitive debut on 13 August 2011 playing for Mantes in a league match against Les Herbiers.

A week later, he departed Mantes to sign an aspirant (youth) contract with professional club Valenciennes. He made his professional debut on 11 August 2012 appearing as a substitute in a 1–0 win over Troyes.

== International career ==
A former youth international for France, Nguette made his senior international debut in a friendly 1–1 tie with Senegal against Nigeria on 23 March 2017.

== Career statistics ==
=== Club ===
As of 30 July 2020

Appearances and goals by club, season and competition
Club	Season	League			Cup (Note: Includes Coupe de France, Coupe de la Ligue, Trophée des champions)		Europe (Note: Includes UEFA Super Cup)		Total	
Club	Season	Division	Apps	Goals	Apps	Goals	Apps	Goals	Apps	Goals
Mantes	2011–12	CFA	1	0	0	0	—		1	0
Valenciennes B	2011–12	CFA	15	2	—		—		15	2
Valenciennes B	2012–13	CFA	8	3	—		—		8	3
Valenciennes B	Total		23	5	0	0	0	0	23	5
Valenciennes	2012–13	Ligue 1	19	3	2	0	—		21	3
Valenciennes	2013–14	Ligue 1	10	0	0	0	—		10	0
Valenciennes	2014–15	Ligue 2	23	4	5	1	—		28	5
Valenciennes	2015–16	Ligue 2	14	1	0	0	—		14	1
Valenciennes	Total		66	8	7	1	—		73	9
Metz	2016–17	Ligue 1	33	2	4	1	—		37	3
Metz	2017–18	Ligue 1	17	0	3	0	—		20	0
Metz	2018–19	Ligue 2	33	7	3	0	—		36	7
Metz	2019–20	Ligue 1	26	5	2	0	—		28	5
Metz	Total		109	14	12	1	—		121	15
Career total			199	27	16	2	0	0	218	29

=== International goals ===
Scores and results list Senegal's goal tally first.

No	Date	Venue	Opponent	Score	Result	Competition
1.	14 November 2017	Stade Léopold Sédar Senghor, Dakar, Senegal	South Africa	1–0	2–1	2018 FIFA World Cup qualification
1.	13 November 2020	Stade Lat-Dior, Thiès, Senegal	Guinea-Bissau	2–0	2–0	2021 Africa Cup of Nations qualification
