= Lenny Lacroix =

French footballer (born 2003)

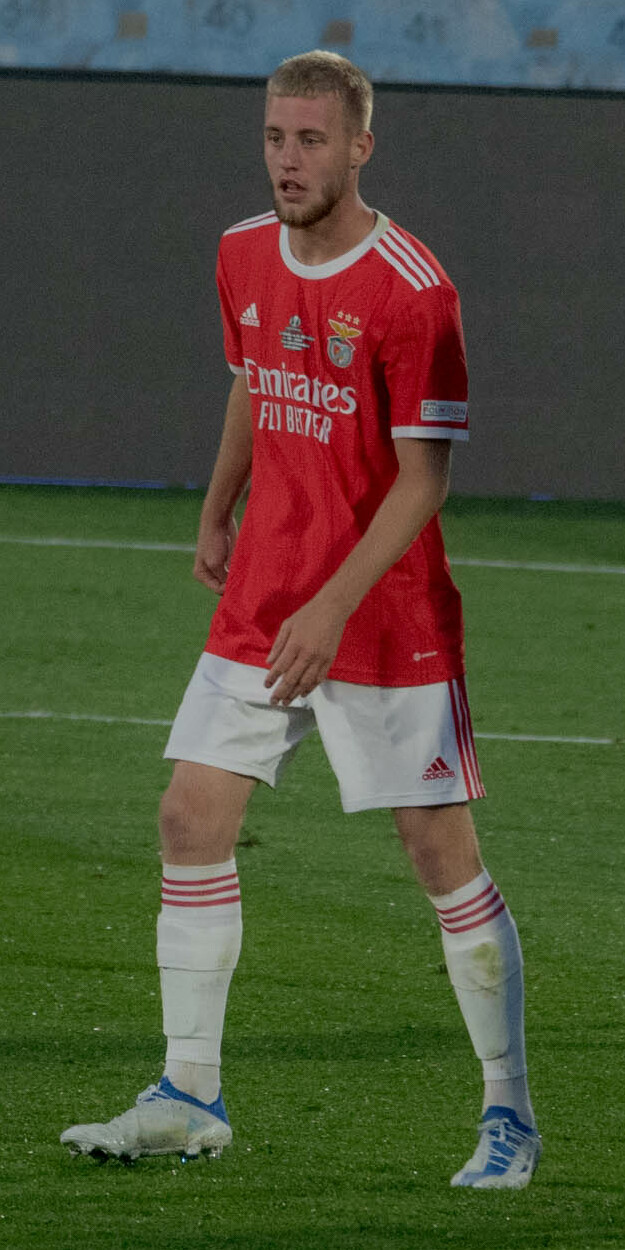
- Lacroix in 2022

Personal information
- Date of birth: 6 February 2003 (age 23)
- Place of birth: Strasbourg, France
- Height: 1.86 m (6 ft 1 in)
- Position: Centre-back

Team information
- Current team: Dijon
- Number: 23

Youth career
- 2009–2016: Strasbourg
- 2016–2017: Mulhouse
- 2017–2019: Metz

Senior career*
| Years | Team | Apps | (Gls) |
| 2019–2022 | Metz II | 26 | (0) |
| 2022 | Metz | 3 | (0) |
| 2022–2025 | Benfica B | 45 | (2) |
| 2025– | Dijon | 18 | (1) |

International career^{‡}
| 2018–2019 | France U16 | 13 | (0) |
| 2019–2020 | France U17 | 6 | (0) |
| 2021 | France U19 | 1 | (0) |
- * Club domestic league appearances and goals as of 22 June 2026 ‡ National team caps and goals as of 18:45, 3 August 2022 (UTC)

Lenny Lacroix (born 6 February 2003) is a French professional footballer who plays as a centre-back for Ligue 2 club Dijon.

== Club career ==
A youth product of Strasbourg, Mulhouse, Metz, Lacroix signed his first professional contract with Metz on 18 December 2019. He made his professional debut with Metz in a 1–0 Ligue 1 win over Reims on 16 January 2022. On 3 August 2022, Lacroix signed a four-years deal with Benfica B.

== International career ==
Lacroix is a youth international for France, having represented the France U16s, U17s, and U19s.

== Honours ==
Benfica

- Under-20 Intercontinental Cup: 2022
