= John Boye =

Ghanaian footballer

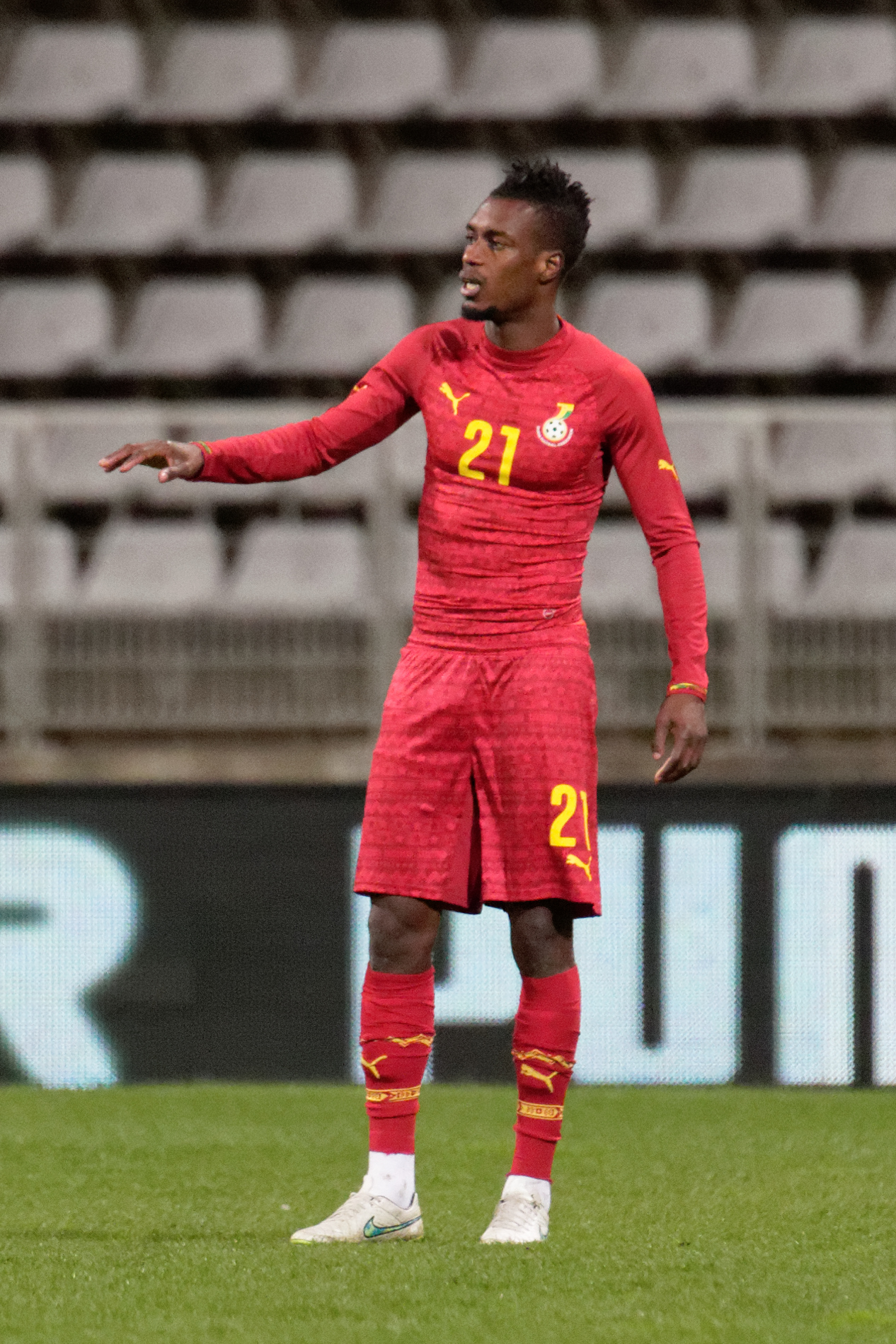
- Boye with Ghana in March 2015

Personal information
- Date of birth: 23 April 1987 (age 39)
- Place of birth: Teshie, Accra, Ghana
- Height: 1.85 m (6 ft 1 in)
- Position: Defender

Youth career
- 2005–2007: Heart of Lions

Senior career*
Years	Team	Apps	(Gls)
2007–2009	Heart of Lions	10	(1)
2008–2009	→ Rennes B (loan)	24	(3)
2009–2010	Rennes B	33	(2)
2011–2014	Rennes	63	(2)
2014–2015	Kayseri Erciyesspor	23	(2)
2015–2018	Sivasspor	60	(8)
2018–2021	Metz	95	(4)
2021–2022	Al-Fayha	4	(0)
Total		312	(22)

International career
2008–2019	Ghana	70	(6)
Medal record
Representing Ghana
Men's football
Africa Cup of Nations
Runner-up	2015 Equatorial Guinea
- * Club domestic league appearances and goals

John Boye (born 23 April 1987) is a Ghanaian former professional footballer who played as a defender.

== Club career ==
=== Early career ===
Born in Accra, Boye began his career with Schwepps' youth academy, where he played alongside Mohammed Iddi, he then later went on to play at Pro Consult Sports Academy and Miracle FC.

=== Heart of Lions and Rennes (loan) ===
Boye moved to Stade Rennais on 29 July 2008 after a two-week trial, he first arrived at Rennes on loan on 1 September 2008 from Ghana Premier League club Heart of Lions with an option to buy, and returned to Heart of Lions on 30 June 2009.

Boye had long been a target for Rennes, but an early attempt from Rennes to sign him in 2009 broke down when it was claimed that he had already signed a deal with the Israeli club, Hapoel Petach Tikva.

=== Rennes ===
In July 2009, the situation had been wrapped up by Heart of Lions, allowing Rennes to complete the move before the summer transfer window 2009 deadline, he signed a contract on 10 July 2009, completing his move from his former club Heart of Lions to Stade Rennais.

=== Sivasspor ===
Boye left Turkish side Sivasspor following the expiration of his contract in June 2018.

=== Metz ===
On 21 June 2018, FC Metz officially announced the capture of John on a four-year deal, keeping him at the club till June 2022.

=== Al-Fayha ===
On 31 August 2021, Boye joined Al-Fayha on a one-year contract.

== International career ==
On 17 June 2008, Boye was called up for the Ghana, making his debut on 22 June 2008 against Gabon. Boye was included in the Ghana national team's 23-man squad for the 2012 Africa Cup of Nations in January 2012 and he made his tournament debut in the 2012 Africa Cup of Nations match against Botswana on 24 January 2012.

He was part of the 2015 Africa Cup of Nations team that took a silver medal after they lost to Ivory Coast in an 8–9 penalty shoot out.

=== International appearances ===
As of 8 July 2019

Appearances and goals by national team, year and competition
National team	Year	Apps	Goals
Ghana	2008	3	0
Ghana	2009	0	0
Ghana	2010	0	0
Ghana	2011	1	0
Ghana	2012	11	0
Ghana	2013	13	3
Ghana	2014	8	0
Ghana	2015	12	1
Ghana	2016	6	1
Ghana	2017	8	1
Ghana	2018	1	0
Ghana	2019	5	0
Total		68	6

=== International goals ===
Scores and results list Ghana's goal tally first, score column indicates score after each Boye goal. Some sources credit Christian Atsu with scoring a goal against Lesotho on 16 June 2013, but FIFA credited it to Boye.

No	Date	Venue	Opponent	Score	Result	Competition
1.	13 January 2013	Baba Yara Stadium, Kumasi, Ghana	Tunisia	1–2	4–2	Friendly
2.	28 January 2013	Nelson Mandela Bay Stadium, Port Elizabeth, South Africa	Niger	3–0	3–1	2013 Africa Cup of Nations
3.	16 June 2013	Setsoto Stadium, Maseru, Lesotho	Lesotho	1–0	2–0	2014 FIFA World Cup qualification
4.	27 January 2015	Estadio de Mongomo, Mongomo, Equatorial Guinea	South Africa	1–1	2–1	2015 Africa Cup of Nations
5.	24 March 2016	Accra Sports Stadium, Accra, Ghana	Mozambique	2–0	3–1	2017 Africa Cup of Nations qualification
6.	11 June 2017	Baba Yara Stadium, Kumasi, Ghana	Ethiopia	2–0	5–0	2019 Africa Cup of Nations qualification

== Honours ==
Sivasspor

- TFF First League: 2016–17

Metz

- Ligue 2: 2018–19

Ghana

- Africa Cup of Nations runner-up: 2015

Individual

- Ligue 2 UNFP Team of the Year: 2018–19
