= Marvin Gakpa =

French footballer (born 1993)

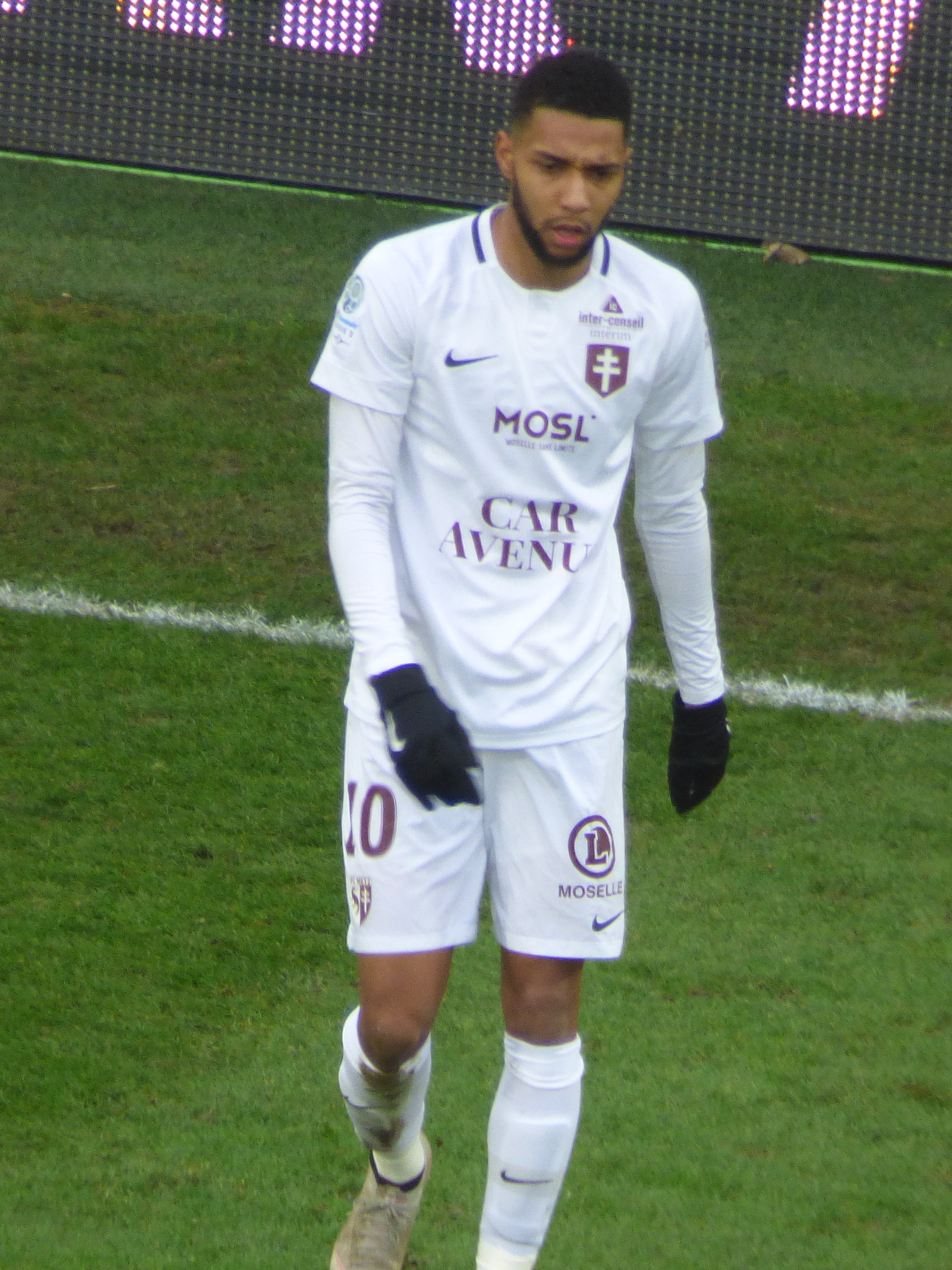
- Gakpa with Metz in 2019

Personal information
- Full name: Marvin Ladji Gakpa
- Date of birth: 1 November 1993 (age 33)
- Place of birth: Dunkirk, France
- Height: 1.82 m (6 ft 0 in)
- Position: Forward

Team information
- Current team: Rouen
- Number: 26

Youth career
- –2010: Dunkerque
- 2010–2011: Valenciennes

Senior career*
Years	Team	Apps	(Gls)
2011–2013	Valenciennes II	30	(4)
2013–2017	Lorient II	64	(9)
2015–2017	Lorient	5	(0)
2016–2017	→ Ajaccio (loan)	31	(3)
2016–2017	→ Ajaccio II (loan)	1	(1)
2017–2018	Quevilly-Rouen	36	(9)
2018–2020	Metz	45	(2)
2020–2021	Paris FC	31	(4)
2021–2024	Manisa	75	(16)
2024	Bandırmaspor	11	(0)
2024–2025	Mesaimeer	12	(1)
2025–2026	Paris 13 Atletico	18	(1)
2026–	Rouen	4	(0)
- * Club domestic league appearances and goals as of 4 September 2026

Marvin Ladji Gakpa (born 1 November 1993) is a French professional footballer who plays as a forward for Ligue 3 club Rouen.

== Club career ==
On 7 September 2021, he signed a three-year contract with Manisa in Turkey.

== Personal life ==
Gakpa was born in Dunkirk in the Northern France. He holds French and Algerian nationalities and is of Ivorian descent.

== Career statistics ==
As of 30 July 2020

Appearances and goals by club, season and competition
Club	Season	League			Cup		League Cup		Continental		Total	
Club	Season	Division	Apps	Goals	Apps	Goals	Apps	Goals	Apps	Goals	Apps	Goals
Valenciennes II	2011–12	CFA	1	0	—		—		—		1	0
Valenciennes II	2012–13	CFA	29	4	—		—		—		29	4
Valenciennes II	Total		30	4	0	0	0	0	0	0	30	4
Lorient II	2013–14	CFA 2	24	5	—		—		—		24	5
Lorient II	2014–15	CFA	25	4	—		—		—		25	4
Lorient II	2015–16	CFA	15	0	—		—		—		15	0
Lorient II	Total		64	9	0	0	0	0	0	0	64	9
Lorient	2014–15	Ligue 1	2	0	0	0	0	0	—		2	0
Lorient	2015–16	Ligue 1	3	0	0	0	1	1	—		4	1
Lorient	Total		5	0	0	0	1	1	0	0	6	1
Ajaccio	2016–17	Ligue 2	31	3	2	0	0	0	—		33	3
Ajaccio II	2016–17	CFA 2	1	1	—		—		—		1	1
Quevilly-Rouen	2017–18	Ligue 2	36	9	1	1	0	0	—		37	10
Metz	2018–19	Ligue 2	32	2	5	2	3	0	—		40	4
Metz	2018–19	Ligue 1	13	0	1	0	1	0	—		15	0
Metz	Total		45	2	6	2	4	0	0	0	55	4
Career totals			212	28	9	3	5	1	0	0	226	32
