= 2021–22 FC Metz season =

FC Metz
2021–22 season
- President: Bernard Serin
- Head coach: Frédéric Antonetti
- Stadium: Stade Saint-Symphorien
- Ligue 1: 19th (relegated)
- Coupe de France: Round of 64
- Top goalscorer: League: Nicolas de Préville (5); All: Nicolas de Préville (5)
Home colours	Away colours	Third colours

The 2021–22 season was the 90th season in the existence of FC Metz and the club's third consecutive season in the top flight of French football. In addition to the domestic league, Metz participated in this season's edition of the Coupe de France.

== Players ==
=== First-team squad ===
Note: Flags indicate national team as defined under FIFA eligibility rules; some limited exceptions apply. Players may hold more than one non-FIFA nationality.

No.	Pos.	Nation	Player
1	GK	FRA	David Oberhauser
2	DF	TUN	Dylan Bronn (captain)
3	DF	FRA	Matthieu Udol
4	DF	FRA	Sikou Niakaté (on loan from Guingamp)
5	DF	BRA	Jemerson
6	MF	FRA	Kévin N'Doram
7	FW	SEN	Ibrahima Niane
8	MF	MLI	Boubacar Traoré
9	FW	FRA	Nicolas de Préville
10	MF	ALG	Farid Boulaya
11	MF	SEN	Opa Nguette
13	DF	GBS	Fali Candé
14	MF	FRA	Vincent Pajot
15	MF	SEN	Pape Matar Sarr (on loan from Tottenham Hotspur)

No.	Pos.	Nation	Player
16	GK	ALG	Alexandre Oukidja
17	DF	FRA	Thomas Delaine
18	DF	FRA	Fabien Centonze
19	MF	CIV	Habib Maïga
23	DF	MLI	Boubakar Kouyaté
24	FW	FRA	Lenny Joseph
26	FW	MTN	Pape Ndiaga Yade
27	DF	CMR	Jean-Armel Kana-Biyik
28	DF	MTQ	Manuel Cabit
29	DF	FRA	Lenny Lacroix
30	GK	FRA	Marc-Aurèle Caillard
32	MF	FRA	Ibrahim Amadou
34	FW	CAF	Louis Mafouta (on loan from Neuchâtel Xamax)
40	GK	SEN	Ousmane Ba

=== Out on loan ===
Note: Flags indicate national team as defined under FIFA eligibility rules; some limited exceptions apply. Players may hold more than one non-FIFA nationality.

No.	Pos.	Nation	Player
—	GK	FRA	Guillaume Dietsch (on loan to Seraing)
—	DF	MAR	Sofiane Alakouch (on loan to Lausanne-Sport)
—	DF	FRA	Rayan Djedje (on loan to Seraing)
—	DF	SEN	Ababacar Lô (on loan to Cholet)
—	MF	BEL	Mathieu Cachbach (on loan to Seraing)
—	MF	FRA	Maïdine Douane (on loan to Seraing)
—	MF	GAM	Ablie Jallow (on loan to Seraing)
—	MF	BEL	Sami Lahssaini (on loan to Seraing)

No.	Pos.	Nation	Player
—	MF	MAR	Amine Bassi (on loan to Barnsley)
—	MF	FRA	Youssef Maziz (on loan to Seraing)
—	MF	SEN	Cheikh Sabaly (on loan to Quevilly-Rouen)
—	FW	GEO	Georges Mikautadze (on loan to Seraing)
—	FW	SEN	Amadou Dia N'Diaye (on loan to Le Mans FC)
—	FW	CPV	Vagner Gonçalves (on loan to FC Sion)
—	FW	SEN	Lamine Gueye (on loan to Paris FC)
—	MF	CGO	Warren Tchimbembé (on loan to CD Mirandés)

== Pre-season and friendlies ==
Win Draw Loss

13 July 2021 Friendly	Metz	3–2	Nancy	Metz, France
17:00 CEST (UTC+2)		Report		Stadium: Centre d’entraînement Frescaty

17 July 2021 Friendly	Metz	1–1	RFC Seraing	Tegelen, Netherlands
17:00 CEST (UTC+2)		Report		Stadium: Sportpark de Bakenbos

24 July 2021 Friendly	Borussia Mönchengladbach	1–0	Metz	Mönchengladbach, Germany
15:30 CEST (UTC+2)	Ashraf (yellow card) 74'; Noß 87'	Report		Stadium: Fohlenplatz; Attendance: 630; Referee: Kevin Domnick

28 July 2021 Friendly	Troyes	1–2	Metz	Homécourt, France
17:30 CEST (UTC+2)	Kukharevych 7'; Bombo (red card) 42'	Report	Niane 10'; Joseph 49'	Stadium: Complexe Sportif d’Homécourt

30 July 2021 Friendly	Metz	4–0	UNFP	Metz, France
17:00 CEST (UTC+2)	Bassi 27'; Traoré 61'; Gueye 83'; Mikautadze 88'			Stadium: Centre d’entraînement Frescaty

31 July 2021 Friendly	Metz	1–0	Montpellier	Metz, France
18:00 CEST (UTC+2)	N'Doram 22'	Report		Stadium: Stade Saint-Symphorien

3 September 2021 Friendly	Metz	0–3	Auxerre	Saint-Dizier, France
16:00 CEST (UTC+2)		Report	Hein 7', 65'; Ben Fredj 52'	Stadium: Stade Marcel Jacquin

12 November 2021 Friendly	Metz	2–1	1. FC Kaiserslautern	Metz, France
14:30 CET (UTC+1)	Traoré 31'; Joseph 54'	Report	Stehle 36'	Stadium: Centre d’entraînement Frescaty; Attendance: 0

24 March 2022 Friendly	Metz	2–0	Wehen Wiesbaden	Metz, France
15:00 CET (UTC+1)	Joseph 56'; Amadou 58'	Report		Stadium: Centre d’entraînement Frescaty

== Competitions ==
=== Overall record ===
Competition	First match	Last match	Starting round	Final position	Record							
Competition	First match	Last match	Starting round	Final position	Pld	W	D	L	GF	GA	GD	Win %
Ligue 1	8 August 2021	21 May 2022	Matchday 1	19th	38	6	13	19	35	69	−34	15.79
Coupe de France	19 December 2021		Round of 64	Round of 64	1	0	1	0	0	0	+0	0.00
Total					39	6	14	19	35	69	−34	15.38

Source: Soccerway

=== Ligue 1 ===
==== League table ====
Pos	Team	Pld	W	D	L	GF	GA	GD	Pts	Qualification or relegation
16	Lorient	38	8	12	18	35	63	−28	36	
17	Clermont	38	9	9	20	38	69	−31	36	
18	Saint-Étienne (R)	38	7	11	20	42	77	−35	32	Qualification for the relegation play-offs
19	Metz (R)	38	6	13	19	35	69	−34	31	Relegation to Ligue 2 (Note: Bordeaux were initially relegated to Ligue 2. However, on 14 June it was decided by the DNCG to relegate Bordeaux administratively to the Championnat National for financial issues. On 27 July 2022, Bordeaux won its appeal and was officially maintained in Ligue 2 for the 2022–23 season.)
20	Bordeaux (R)	38	6	13	19	52	91	−39	31	Relegation to Ligue 2

Source: Ligue 1
Rules for classification: 1) Points; 2) Goal difference; 3) Head-to-head points; 4) Head-to-head goal difference; 5) Head-to-head goals scored; 6) Head-to-head away goals scored; 7) Goals scored; 8) Away goals scored; 9) Fair-play points (Note: Head-to-head record is used only after all the matches between the teams in question have been played).
(R) Relegated

==== Results summary ====
Overall								Home						Away					
Pld	W	D	L	GF	GA	GD	Pts	W	D	L	GF	GA	GD	W	D	L	GF	GA	GD
38	6	13	19	35	69	−34	31	3	7	9	21	31	−10	3	6	10	14	38	−24

Source: Ligue 1

==== Results by round ====
Round	1	2	3	4	5	6	7	8	9	10	11	12	13	14	15	16	17	18	19	20	21	22	23	24	25	26	27	28	29	30	31	32	33	34	35	36	37	38
Ground	H	A	H	A	H	A	H	A	A	H	A	H	A	H	A	H	A	H	A	H	A	H	A	H	A	H	A	H	A	H	A	H	A	H	A	H	H	A
Result	D	L	D	D	L	L	L	W	L	L	L	D	D	D	W	L	L	W	D	L	W	L	D	L	D	D	L	D	L	L	L	D	L	L	D	W	W	L
Position	6	15	13	15	18	20	20	18	18	18	19	19	20	20	19	19	19	18	18	18	15	18	18	19	19	18	19	19	19	19	20	20	20	20	20	19	18	19

Source: Ligue 1
A = Away; H = Home; W = Win; D = Draw; L = Loss

==== Matches ====
The league fixtures were announced on 25 June 2021.

8 August 2021 1	Metz	3–3	Lille	Metz
17:00 CEST (UTC+2)	Centonze 31', 52'; Udol 41'; Bronn (yellow card) 56'; Kouyaté (red card) 56'	Report	Botman 23'; Ikoné (yellow card) 79', (goal) 81'; Yılmaz (yellow card) 83'; Oukidja 90+7' (o.g.)	Stadium: Stade Saint-Symphorien; Attendance: 15,551; Referee: Eric Wattellier

15 August 2021 2	Nantes	2–0	Metz	Nantes
15:00 CEST (UTC+2)	Kolo Muani 12'; Blas 49', (yellow card) 52'; Coco (yellow card) 90'	Report		Stadium: Stade de la Beaujoire; Attendance: 12,054; Referee: Johan Hamel

22 August 2021 3	Metz	1–1	Reims	Metz
15:00 CEST (UTC+2)	Maïga 14'; Bronn (yellow card) 31'; Niane (yellow card) 35'; Sarr (yellow card) 36'; Vagner (yellow card) 90+3'	Report	Munetsi 7'; Foket (yellow card) 42'; Gravillon (yellow card) 60'	Stadium: Stade Saint-Symphorien; Attendance: 14,799; Referee: Florent Batta

29 August 2021 4	Clermont	2–2	Metz	Clermont-Ferrand
15:00 CEST (UTC+2)	Niakaté 34' (o.g.); Ogier (yellow card) 39'; Rashani 57'	Report	Niane 9' (pen.); Desmas 28' (o.g.); Sarr (yellow card) 29'; Alakouch (yellow card) 90'	Stadium: Stade Gabriel Montpied; Attendance: 11,296; Referee: Hakim Ben El Hadj

12 September 2021 5	Metz	0–2	Troyes	Metz
15:00 CEST (UTC+2)	Maïga (yellow card) 33'; De Préville (yellow card) 63'	Report	Rodrigues 50'; Azamoum (yellow card) 57'; Chavalerin 84'	Stadium: Stade Saint-Symphorien; Attendance: 15,269; Referee: Pierre Gaillouste

17 September 2021 6	Strasbourg	3–0	Metz	Strasbourg
21:00 CEST (UTC+2)	Ajorque 6' (pen.), (yellow card) 18'; Diallo 26', 40'; Nyamsi (yellow card) 29'	Report	Centonze (yellow card) 28'; Kouyaté (yellow card) 44'; Traoré (yellow card) 84'; Joseph (yellow card) 90+1'	Stadium: Stade de la Meinau; Attendance: 25,437; Referee: Eric Wattellier

22 September 2021 7	Metz	1–2	Paris Saint-Germain	Metz
21:00 CEST (UTC+2)	Yade (yellow card) 19'; Kouyaté 39'; Maïga (yellow card) 69'; Bronn (yellow card) 73' (yellow-red card) 90+1'; Centonze (yellow card) 90+1'; Oukidja (yellow card) 90+6'	Report	Hakimi 5', 90+4'; Mendes (yellow card) 70'; Neymar (yellow card) 90+6'	Stadium: Stade Saint-Symphorien; Attendance: 26,661; Referee: Jérémie Pignard

26 September 2021 8	Brest	1–2	Metz	Brest
15:00 CEST (UTC+2)	Pierre-Gabriel (yellow card) 46'; Faivre 68' (pen.); Mbock (yellow card) 71'; Chardonnet (yellow card) 88'	Report	De Préville 26'; Kouyaté (yellow card) 40'; Centonze 74', (yellow card) 82'	Stadium: Stade Francis-Le Blé; Attendance: 10,398; Referee: Willy Delajod

3 October 2021 9	Angers	3–2	Metz	Angers
15:00 CEST (UTC+2)	Cho (yellow card) 52', (goal) 53'; Mangani 66'; Bahoken 90+3'	Report	Bronn 10', (yellow card) 90+1'; Maïga (yellow card) 30'; De Préville (yellow card) 39'; Boulaya 58'	Stadium: Stade Raymond Kopa; Attendance: 3,989; Referee: Stéphanie Frappart

17 October 2021 10	Metz	0–3	Rennes	Metz
15:00 CEST (UTC+2)	Pajot (yellow card) 20'; Yade (yellow card) 64'; Amadou Mbengue (yellow card) 72'	Report	Omari (yellow card) 3'; Laborde 24'; Sulemana 37'; Terrier 45'	Stadium: Stade Saint-Symphorien; Attendance: 15,679; Referee: Benoît Millot

24 October 2021 11	Lens	4–1	Metz	Lens
15:00 CEST (UTC+2)	Saïd 14', 37'; Leca (yellow card) 65'; Ganago 83', (yellow card) 87'; Frankowski 90'	Report	Pajot (yellow card) 20'; De Préville 33'; Maïga (yellow card) 39'; N'Doram (yellow card) 53'	Stadium: Stade Bollaert-Delelis; Attendance: 35,673; Referee: Jérémie Pignard

30 October 2021 12	Metz	1–1	Saint-Étienne	Metz
17:00 CEST (UTC+2)	Boulaya 9'	Report	Khazri 16'; Maçon (yellow card) 18'; Sow (yellow card) 28'; Camara (yellow card) 87'	Stadium: Stade Saint-Symphorien; Attendance: 15,914; Referee: Stéphanie Frappart

7 November 2021 13	Marseille	0–0	Metz	Marseille
13:00 CET (UTC+1)	Ćaleta-Car (yellow card) 70'	Report	N'Doram (yellow card) 12'; Kouyaté (yellow card) 35'; Jemerson (red card) 55'; Oukidja (yellow card) 90+8'	Stadium: Stade Vélodrome; Attendance: 61,539; Referee: Jérôme Brisard

21 November 2021 14	Metz	3–3	Bordeaux	Metz
15:00 CET (UTC+1)	Sarr (yellow card) 28'; De Préville 45'; Nguette 52', 71'; Bronn (yellow card) 55'; Boulaya (red card) 68'	Report	Elis 17', (yellow card) 30'; Oudin 39', 67'; Adli (yellow card) 68'	Stadium: Stade Saint-Symphorien; Attendance: 16,077; Referee: Benoît Millot

27 November 2021 15	Nice	0–1	Metz	Nice
21:00 CET (UTC+1)	Delort (yellow card) 21'; Stengs (yellow card) 39'	Report	N'Doram (yellow card) 4'; Jemerson (yellow card) 16'; Centonze 31'	Stadium: Allianz Riviera; Attendance: 17,033; Referee: François Letexier

1 December 2021 16	Metz	1–3	Montpellier	Metz
19:00 CET (UTC+1)	Sarr (yellow card) 34'; Bronn (yellow card) 36'; De Préville 70'	Report	Savanier 36'; Mavididi 45+1'; Wahi 48'; Mollet (yellow card) 72'; Ristić (yellow card) 83'	Stadium: Stade Saint-Symphorien; Attendance: 13,992; Referee: Ruddy Buquet

5 December 2021 17	Monaco	4–0	Metz	Monaco
15:00 CET (UTC+1)	Diop 2'; Volland 44' (pen.), (yellow card) 49'; Martins 57'; Ben Yedder 87'	Report	Bronn (yellow card) 78'; Traoré (yellow card) 90'	Stadium: Stade Louis II; Attendance: 4,923; Referee: Bastien Dechepy

12 December 2021 18	Metz	4–1	Lorient	Metz
15:00 CET (UTC+1)	Sarr 5', (yellow card) 89'; Jens 9' (o.g.); Boulaya 19'; Pajot (yellow card) 49'; Niane 80'	Report	Abergel (yellow card) 17'; Laporte (yellow card) 28'; Jenz 69'	Stadium: Stade Saint-Symphorien; Attendance: 14,037; Referee: Eric Wattellier

22 December 2021 19	Lyon	1–1	Metz	Décines-Charpieu
21:00 CET (UTC+1)	Caqueret (yellow card) 30'; Da Silva (yellow card) 39'; Lukeba 56'	Report	Jemerson (yellow card) 34'; Traoré 58'; Maïga (yellow card) 68'; Mbengue (yellow card) 84'	Stadium: Groupama Stadium; Attendance: 34,867; Referee: Pierre Gaillouste

9 January 2022 20	Metz	0–2	Strasbourg	Metz
15:00 CET (UTC+1)	Mbengue (yellow card) 90'	Report	Ajorque 50'; Liénard (yellow card) 80'; Aholou 90+1'	Stadium: Stade Saint-Symphorien; Attendance: 5,000; Referee: Antony Gautier

16 January 2022 21	Reims	0–1	Metz	Reims
15:00 CET (UTC+1)	Locko (yellow card) 24'; Lopy (yellow card) 50'; Foket (yellow card) 80'; Rajković (yellow card) 85'	Report	Delaine (yellow card) 19'; Niakaté (yellow card) 28'; Pajot (yellow card) 45'; Niane 61', (yellow card) 83'	Stadium: Stade Auguste Delaune; Attendance: 3,923; Referee: Jérémie Pignard

23 January 2022 22	Metz	0–2	Nice	Metz
13:00 CET (UTC+1)	Kana-Biyik (yellow card) 45+1'; Mbengue (yellow card) 55'; Yade (yellow card) 57'	Report	Thuram 58'; Rosario (yellow card) 64'; Gouiri 86' (pen.)	Stadium: Stade Saint-Symphorien; Attendance: 5,000; Referee: Amaury Delerue

6 February 2022 23	Troyes	0–0	Metz	Troyes
15:00 CET (UTC+1)	Kouamé (yellow card) 45'	Report	Amadou (yellow card) 40'; Traoré (yellow card) 42'	Stadium: Stade de l'Aube; Attendance: 7,227; Referee: Pierre Gaillouste

13 February 2022 24	Metz	1–2	Marseille	Metz
20:45 CET (UTC+1)	Pajot (yellow card) 19'; Traoré (yellow card) 45+1'; Maïga 52'	Report	Bakambu 26', (yellow card) 71'; Milik 82'; Payet (yellow card) 88'	Stadium: Stade Saint-Symphorien; Attendance: 25,482; Referee: Eric Wattellier

18 February 2022 25	Lille	0–0	Metz	Villeneuve-d'Ascq
21:00 CET (UTC+1)	Zhegrova (yellow card) 83' (yellow-red card) 90+2'; Fonte (yellow card) 87'; Djaló (yellow card) 90+7'	Report	Maïga (yellow card) 22'; Kouyaté (yellow card) 67'; Caillard (yellow card) 79'; Amadou (yellow card) 90+7'	Stadium: Stade Pierre-Mauroy; Attendance: 30,384; Referee: Bastien Dechepy

27 February 2022 26	Metz	0–0	Nantes	Metz
15:00 CET (UTC+1)	Amadou (yellow card) 59'; Pajot (red card) 86'	Report	Cyprien (yellow card) 40'; Traoré (yellow card) 51'	Stadium: Stade Saint-Symphorien; Attendance: 15,851; Referee: Florent Batta

6 March 2022 27	Saint-Étienne	1–0	Metz	Saint-Étienne
13:00 CET (UTC+1)	Bouanga (yellow card) 20', (goal) 52'; Gourna-Douath (yellow card) 62'; Nordin (yellow card) 74'	Report	De Préville (yellow card) 38'; Bronn (yellow card) 44'; Delaine (yellow card) 58'; Traoré (yellow card) 64'	Stadium: Stade Geoffroy-Guichard; Attendance: 35,706; Referee: Jérémy Stinat

13 March 2022 28	Metz	0–0	Lens	Metz
15:00 CET (UTC+1)	Boulaya (yellow card) 15'; De Préville (yellow card) 19'; Sarr (yellow card) 43'; Kouyaté (yellow card) 78'; N'Doram (yellow card) 89'	Report	Sotoca (yellow card) 58'; Danso (yellow card) 64'	Stadium: Stade Saint-Symphorien; Attendance: 15,687; Referee: Amaury Delerue

20 March 2022 29	Rennes	6–1	Metz	Rennes
15:00 CET (UTC+1)	Terrier 18' (pen.), 27'; Guirassy 40', 54', 64'; Traoré 59'; Santamaria (yellow card) 82'	Report	Kouyaté (yellow card) 25'; Candé (yellow card) 70'; Mafouta 87'	Stadium: Roazhon Park; Attendance: 27,966; Referee: Willy Delajod

3 April 2022 30	Metz	1–2	Monaco	Metz
15:00 CEST (UTC+2)	Amadou 62'	Report	Ben Yedder 46'; Boadu 72'	Stadium: Stade Saint-Symphorien; Attendance: 19,812; Referee: Jérôme Brisard

10 April 2022 31	Bordeaux	3–1	Metz	Bordeaux
13:00 CEST (UTC+2)	Lacoux (yellow card) 34'; Gregersen (yellow card) 49'; Mangas 52'; Niang 68'; Hwang (yellow card) 83', (goal) 88'	Report	Lamkel Zé 21', (yellow card) 34'; Kouyaté (yellow card) 42'	Stadium: Matmut Atlantique; Attendance: 21,652; Referee: Jérémie Pignard

17 April 2022 32	Metz	1–1	Clermont	Metz
15:00 CEST (UTC+2)	De Préville 54'; Niane (red card) 40'; Bronn (yellow card) 72'	Report	Dossou 37'; Ogier (yellow card) 84'	Stadium: Stade Saint-Symphorien; Attendance: 14,335; Referee: Pierre Gaillouste

20 April 2022 33	Lorient	1–0	Metz	Lorient
19:00 CEST (UTC+2)	Laporte (yellow card) 22'; Mendes (yellow card) 81'; Ouattara 90+4'	Report	Amadou (yellow card) 36'; Nguette (yellow card) 84'	Stadium: Stade du Moustoir; Attendance: 13,554; Referee: Mikael Lesage

24 April 2022 34	Metz	0–1	Brest	Metz
15:00 CEST (UTC+2)	N'Doram (yellow card) 14'; Jemerson (yellow card) 35', (red card) 78'; Kouyaté (yellow card) 37'; Delaine (yellow card) 74'; Oukidja (red card) 80'	Report	Belaïli 27'	Stadium: Stade Saint-Symphorien; Attendance: 19,874; Referee: Florent Batta

1 May 2022 35	Montpellier	2–2	Metz	Montpellier
15:00 CEST (UTC+2)	Oyongo (yellow card) 29'; Leroy (yellow card) 58'; Souquet 80'; Wahi 90+1'	Report	Delaine 24'; Pajot (yellow card) 51'; Sarr (yellow card) 66'; Lamkel Zé (yellow card) 68'; Mafouta 70'	Stadium: Stade de la Mosson; Attendance: 10,446; Referee: Clément Turpin

8 May 2022 36	Metz	3–2	Lyon	Metz
13:00 CEST (UTC+2)	Pajot 27'; Lamkel Zé 40'; Niakaté (yellow card) 70'; Traoré (yellow card) 74'; De Préville (yellow card) 88'; Boulaya 90'	Report	Dembélé 43', 84'; Mendes (red card) 68'; Ndombele (yellow card) 86'; Dubois (yellow card) 90+3'	Stadium: Stade Saint-Symphorien; Attendance: 20,405; Referee: Eric Wattellier

14 May 2022 37	Metz	1–0	Angers	Metz
21:00 CEST (UTC+2)	Candé (yellow card) 34'; Lamkel Zé 50'; Traoré (yellow card) 60'; Delaine (yellow card) 68'	Report	Bentaleb (yellow card) 23'	Stadium: Stade Saint-Symphorien; Attendance: 17,213; Referee: Jérémie Pignard

21 May 2022 38	Paris Saint-Germain	5–0	Metz	Paris
21:00 CEST (UTC+2)	Mbappé 25', 28', 50'; Neymar 31', (yellow card) 72'; Di María 67'	Report	Traoré (yellow card) 23' (yellow-red card) 58'	Stadium: Parc des Princes; Attendance: 47,926; Referee: Antony Gautier

=== Coupe de France ===
19 December 2021 Round of 64	Bergerac Périgord FC	0–0 (5–4 p)	Metz	Bergerac
13:45 CET (UTC+1)		Report		Stadium: Stade de Campréal; Attendance: 3,500; Referee: Nicolas Rainville
	Penalties
	Fachan (penalty scored); Escarpit (penalty scored); Ducros (penalty scored); Mingoua (penalty scored); M'Laab (penalty scored)		(penalty scored) Niane; (penalty missed) Sarr; (penalty scored) Yade; (penalty scored) Jemerson; (penalty scored) Boulaya

== Statistics ==
=== Goalscorers ===
As of 21 May 2022

Rank	No.	Pos.	Nat.	Name	Ligue 1	Coupe de France	Total				
1	9	ST	(France)	Nicolas de Préville	5	0	5				
2	10	AM	(France)	Farid Boulaya	4	0	4				
2	18	RB	(France)	Fabien Centonze	4	0	4	Totals	13	0	13
