= 2023–24 FC Metz season =

FC Metz
2023–24 season
- President: Bernard Serin
- Manager: László Bölöni
- Stadium: Stade Saint-Symphorien
- Ligue 1: 16th (relegated)
- Coupe de France: Round of 64
- Top goalscorer: League: Georges Mikautadze (13); All: Georges Mikautadze (14)
- Biggest win: Metz 3–1 Nantes; Nantes 0–2 Metz
- Biggest defeat: Rennes 5–1 Metz
Home colours	Away colours	Third colours

The 2023–24 season was Football Club de Metz's 92nd season in existence and first season back in Ligue 1. They also competed in the Coupe de France.

== Players ==
=== First-team squad ===
As of 11 February 2024

Note: Flags indicate national team as defined under FIFA eligibility rules; some limited exceptions apply. Players may hold more than one non-FIFA nationality.

No.	Pos.	Nation	Player
1	GK	FRA	Guillaume Dietsch
2	DF	FRA	Maxime Colin
3	DF	FRA	Matthieu Udol (captain)
5	DF	GBS	Fali Candé
6	MF	FRA	Kévin N'Doram
7	FW	SEN	Pape Amadou Diallo
8	DF	CIV	Ismaël Traoré (vice-captain)
10	FW	GEO	Georges Mikautadze (on loan from Ajax)
11	FW	CMR	Didier Lamkel Zé (on loan from Hatayspor)
12	MF	CGO	Warren Tchimbembé
14	MF	SEN	Cheikh Sabaly
15	DF	SEN	Ababacar Lô
16	GK	ALG	Alexandre Oukidja
17	FW	GHA	Benjamin Tetteh

No.	Pos.	Nation	Player
18	MF	SEN	Lamine Camara
22	DF	ALG	Kevin Van Den Kerkhof
25	MF	FRA	Arthur Atta
26	FW	SEN	Malick Mbaye
27	MF	HAI	Danley Jean Jacques
29	DF	MTQ	Christophe Hérelle
30	GK	FRA	Marc-Aurèle Caillard
34	MF	FRA	Joseph N'Duquidi
36	MF	GAM	Ablie Jallow
37	FW	SEN	Ibou Sané
38	DF	SEN	Sadibou Sané
39	DF	CIV	Koffi Kouao
99	FW	SWE	Joel Asoro

=== Out on loan ===
Note: Flags indicate national team as defined under FIFA eligibility rules; some limited exceptions apply. Players may hold more than one non-FIFA nationality.

No.	Pos.	Nation	Player
—	GK	SEN	Ousmane Ba (on loan to Cholet)
—	DF	MAR	Sofiane Alakouch (on loan to Paris FC)
—	MF	MAR	Othmane Chraibi (on loan to Châteauroux)
—	MF	FRA	Oussmane Kébé (on loan to Seraing)
—	MF	BEL	Sami Lahssaini (on loan to RAAL La Louvière)
—	MF	FRA	Lilian Raillot (on loan to Seraing)

No.	Pos.	Nation	Player
—	FW	CMR	Morgan Bokele (on loan to SAS Épinal)
—	FW	FRA	Simon Elisor (on loan to Troyes)
—	FW	ALB	Xhuliano Skuka (on loan to Partizani)
—	FW	FRA	Édouard Soumah-Abbad (on loan to Seraing)
—	FW	MTN	Pape Ndiaga Yade (on loan to Quevilly-Rouen)

== Transfers ==
=== In ===
Pos.	Player	Transferred from	Fee	Date	Source
MF	(France) Simon Elisor	(Belgium) RFC Seraing	€400,000	5 July 2023	
DF	(France) Maxime Colin	(England) Birmingham City	Free	27 July 2023	
FW	(Ghana) Benjamin Tetteh	(England) Hull City	1,800,000	10 August 2023	
MF	(Sweden) Joel Asoro	(Sweden) Djurgården	1,200,000	24 August 2023	
DF	(Algeria) Kevin Van Den Kerkhof	(France) Bastia	2,500,000	31 August 2023	
DF	(France) Christophe Hérelle	(France) Brest	Undisclosed	1 September 2023	
FW	(Colombia) Óscar Estupiñán	(England) Hull City	Loan	1 September 2023	
FW	(Albania) Xhuliano Skuka	(Albania) Maribor	Loan return	31 December 2023	
FW	(Georgia (country)) Georges Mikautadze	(Netherlands) Ajax	Loan	4 January 2024	

=== Out ===
Pos.	Player	Transferred to	Fee	Date	Source
MF	(Mali) Boubacar Traoré	(England) Wolverhampton Wanderers	€11,000,000	1 July 2023	
FW	(Senegal) Ibrahima Niane	(France) Angers	€500,000	1 July 2023	
FW	(Albania) Xhuliano Skuka	(Slovenia) Maribor	Loan	1 July 2023	
MF	(Senegal) Lamine Gueye	(France) Paris FC	Undisclosed	5 July 2023	
DF	(Morocco) Othmane Chraibi	(France) Châteauroux	Loan	19 July 2023	
FW	(France) Lenny Joseph	(France) Grenoble	Undisclosed	20 July 2023	
GK	(Senegal) Ousmane Ba	(France) Cholet	Loan	21 July 2023	
MF	(Mauritania) Pape Ndiaga Yade	(France) Quevilly-Rouen	Loan	27 July 2023	
MF	(France) Youssef Maziz	(Belgium) OH Leuven	€1,500,000	29 August 2023	
FW	(Georgia (country)) Georges Mikautadze	(Netherlands) Ajax	€16,000,000	30 August 2023	
MF	(Ivory Coast) Habib Maïga	(Hungary) Ferencváros		4 January 2024	
FW	(Albania) Xhuliano Skuka	(Albania) Partizani	Loan	6 January 2024	
FW	(France) Simon Elisor	(France) Troyes	Loan	11 January 2024	
FW	(Colombia) Óscar Estupiñán	(England) Hull City	Loan return	1 February 2024	

== Pre-season and friendlies ==
Win Draw Loss Fixtures

11 July 2023 Friendly	Metz (France)	3–0	(Luxembourg) Racing-Union	Homécourt
18:00 UTC+2	Vagner 15'; Sabaly 52'; Joseph 76'			Stadium: Stade Yvan Tepus

15 July 2023 Friendly	Metz (France)	2–1	(Belgium) RFC Seraing	Metz
15:30 UTC+2	Joseph 45+1'; Mikautadze 51'	Report	Cachbach 43'	Stadium: Stade Saint-Symphorien

22 July 2023 Friendly	Troyes (France)	0–3	(France) Metz	Troyes
17:00 UTC+2		Report	Mikautadze 7'; I. Sané 78', 79'	Stadium: Stade de l'Aube

25 July 2023 Friendly	Metz (France)	Cancelled	(France) Sochaux

25 July 2023 Friendly	Metz (France)	2–2	(Belgium) Standard Liège	Marly
15:00 UTC+2	Maziz 19'; Camara 83' (pen.)		Berberi 74'; Emond 90'	Stadium: Centre d’entraînement de Frescaty

29 July 2023 Friendly	Amiens (France)	0–0	(France) Metz	Amiens
18:00 UTC+2				Stadium: Stade de la Licorne

8 September 2023 Friendly	Metz (France)	1–1	(Switzerland) Basel	Longeville-lès-Metz
13:00	Elisor 29'		Dubasin 37'	Stadium: Stade Saint-Symphorien
Note: Fair game, no yellow cards

21 March 2024 Friendly	Metz (France)	0–0	(France) Troyes	centre d'entrainement Frescaty
16:00 UTC+1

== Competitions ==
=== Overall record ===
Competition	First match	Last match	Starting round	Final position	Record							
Competition	First match	Last match	Starting round	Final position	Pld	W	D	L	GF	GA	GD	Win %
Ligue 1	13 August 2023	19 May 2024	Matchday 1	16th	34	8	5	21	35	58	−23	23.53
Ligue 1 relegation play-offs	30 May 2024	2 June 2024	First leg	Runners-up	2	0	1	1	3	4	−1	0.00
Coupe de France	5 January 2024		Round of 64	Round of 64	1	0	1	0	1	1	+0	0.00
Total					37	8	7	22	39	63	−24	21.62

Source: Soccerway

=== Ligue 1 ===
==== League table ====
Pos	Team	Pld	W	D	L	GF	GA	GD	Pts	Qualification or relegation
14	Nantes	34	9	6	19	30	55	−25	33	
15	Le Havre	34	7	11	16	34	45	−11	32	
16	Metz (R)	34	8	5	21	35	58	−23	29 (Note: Metz finished ahead of Lorient on head-to-head away goals scored: Lorient 2–3 Metz, Metz 1–2 Lorient.)	Qualification for the Relegation play-offs
17	Lorient (R)	34	7	8	19	43	66	−23	29	Relegation to Ligue 2
18	Clermont (R)	34	5	10	19	26	60	−34	25	Relegation to Ligue 2

Source: Ligue 1
Rules for classification: 1) Points; 2) Goal difference; 3) Head-to-head points; 4) Head-to-head goal difference; 5) Head-to-head goals scored; 6) Head-to-head away goals scored; 7) Goals scored; 8) Away goals scored; 9) Fair-play points (Note: Head-to-head record is used only after all the matches between the teams in question have been played).
(R) Relegated

==== Results summary ====
Overall								Home						Away					
Pld	W	D	L	GF	GA	GD	Pts	W	D	L	GF	GA	GD	W	D	L	GF	GA	GD
34	8	5	21	35	58	−23	29	3	3	11	17	27	−10	5	2	10	18	31	−13

Source: Ligue 1

==== Results by round ====
Round	1	2	3	4	5	6	7	8	9	10	11	12	13	14	15	16	17	18	19	20	21	22	23	24	25	26	27	28	29	30	31	32	33	34
Ground	A	H	A	H	A	H	A	H	A	H	A	H	A	A	H	H	A	H	A	H	A	A	H	A	H	A	H	A	H	A	H	H	A	H
Result	L	D	W	D	W	L	L	L	L	D	D	W	W	L	L	L	L	L	L	L	D	L	L	W	W	L	L	L	W	W	L	L	L	L
Position	18	15	12	13	7	12	14	15	16	16	16	11	9	11	12	14	14	15	15	16	17	17	17	17	17	17	17	17	17	15	16	16	16	16

Source: Ligue 1
A = Away; H = Home; W = Win; D = Draw; L = Loss

==== Matches ====
The league fixtures were unveiled on 29 June 2023.

13 August 2023 1	Rennes	5–1	Metz	Rennes
17:05 CEST (UTC+2)	Kalimuendo 20'; Gouiri 52'; Doku 67'; Salah 87', 90+4'	Report	Maziz 21'; Kouao (yellow card) 45+2'; Colin (yellow card) 46'	Stadium: Roazhon Park; Attendance: 26,065; Referee: Jérémy Stinat

18 August 2023 2	Metz	2–2	Marseille	Metz
21:00 CEST (UTC+2)	N'Doram (yellow card) 9'; Lô (red card) 59'; Sabaly 65'; Mikautadze 71'; Mbaye (yellow card) 90'; Oukidja (yellow card) 90+8'	Report	Soglo 14'; Lodi (yellow card) 49'; Vitinha 82'; Veretout (yellow card) 85'	Stadium: Stade Saint-Symphorien; Attendance: 26,661; Referee: Jérôme Brisard

27 August 2023 3	Clermont	0–1	Metz	Clermont-Ferrand
15:00 CEST (UTC+2)	Cham (yellow card) 58'	Report	Mikautadze 69'; Sabaly (yellow card) 84'	Stadium: Stade Gabriel Montpied; Attendance: 9,146; Referee: Gaël Angoula

3 September 2023 4	Metz	2–2	Reims	Metz
15:00 CEST (UTC+2)	Sabaly 6'; Jallow 63'	Report	O. Diakité 17', (yellow card) 90'; Teuma (yellow card) 25'; Foket (yellow card) 45+2', (goal) 52'; Richardson (yellow card) 80'	Stadium: Stade Saint-Symphorien; Attendance: 24,272; Referee: Mathieu Vernice

16 September 2023 5	Lens	0–1	Metz	Lens
21:00 CEST (UTC+2)	Wahi (yellow card) 64'	Report	Asoro (yellow card) 33', (goal) 37'; Candé (yellow card) 64'	Stadium: Stade Bollaert-Delelis; Attendance: 37,988; Referee: Stéphanie Frappart

24 September 2023 6	Metz	0–1	Strasbourg	Metz
13:00 CEST (UTC+2)	Kouao (yellow card) 22'; N'Doram (yellow card) 90+3'	Report	Diarra 83'	Stadium: Stade Saint-Symphorien; Attendance: 26,661; Referee: Clément Turpin

1 October 2023 7	Toulouse	3–0	Metz	Toulouse
15:00 CEST (UTC+2)	Nicolaisen (yellow card) 13'; Schmidt 31'; Dallinga 43'; Suazo (yellow card) 63'; Sierro (yellow card) 75'; Magri 82'	Report		Stadium: Stadium de Toulouse; Attendance: 24,770; Referee: Gaël Angoula

7 October 2023 8	Metz	0–1	Nice	Metz
17:00 CEST (UTC+2)		Report	Boudaoui 14'; Thuram (yellow card) 21'	Stadium: Stade Saint-Symphorien; Attendance: 23,160; Referee: Jérôme Brisard

22 October 2023 9	Monaco	2–1	Metz	Monaco
17:05 CEST (UTC+2)	Golovin 43', 55'; Matsima (yellow card) 67'	Report	Camara 4', (yellow card) 53'; Tetteh (yellow card) 66'; N'Duquidi (yellow card) 74'	Stadium: Stade Louis II; Attendance: 6,197; Referee: Romain Lissorgue

29 October 2023 10	Metz	0–0	Le Havre	Metz
15:00 CET (UTC+1)	N'Duquidi (yellow card) 45+2'; Udol (yellow card) 62'	Report	Salmier (yellow card) 42'; Bayo (yellow card) 56'	Stadium: Stade Saint-Symphorien; Attendance: 20,718; Referee: Hakim Ben El Hadj

5 November 2023 11	Lyon	1–1	Metz	Décines-Charpieu
13:00 CET (UTC+1)	Diomandé (yellow card) 19'; Alvero 84'	Report	Jallow 77'; Van Den Kerkhof (yellow card) 88'	Stadium: Groupama Stadium; Attendance: 42,040; Referee: Benoît Millot

12 November 2023 12	Metz	3–1	Nantes	Metz
15:00 CET (UTC+1)	Van Den Kerkhof 3'; Elisor 28'; Asoro 85'	Report	Simon 12'	Stadium: Stade Saint-Symphorien; Attendance: 21,674; Referee: Florent Batta

26 November 2023 13	Lorient	2–3	Metz	Lorient
15:00 CET (UTC+1)	Faivre 8'; Kroupi 22'; Yongwa (yellow card) 48'; Doucouré (yellow card) 56'	Report	Sabaly 1'; Udol (yellow card) 45'; Traoré 65'; Jallow 83' (pen.)	Stadium: Stade du Moustoir; Attendance: 14,469; Referee: Jérémie Pignard

3 December 2023 14	Lille	2–0	Metz	Villeneuve d'Ascq
17:05 CET (UTC+1)	Yazıcı 45+2'; David 45+6' (pen.)	Report	Elisor (penalty missed) 29'; Camara (penalty missed) 55'	Stadium: Stade Pierre-Mauroy; Attendance: 38,065; Referee: Gaël Angoula

10 December 2023 15	Metz	0–1	Brest	Metz
15:00 CET (UTC+1)	Hérelle (yellow card) 40'; Elisor (yellow card) 42'; Jallow (yellow card) 59'	Report	Lala (yellow card) 2'; Lees-Melou (yellow card) 14'; Le Douaron 75'	Stadium: Stade Saint-Symphorien; Attendance: 20,157; Referee: Romain Lissorgue

17 December 2023 16	Metz	0–1	Montpellier	Metz
15:00 CET (UTC+1)	Diallo (yellow card) 53'; Udol (yellow card) 90+2'	Report	Estève 9'; Jullien (yellow card) 74'; Lecomte (yellow card) 85'	Stadium: Stade Saint-Symphorien; Attendance: 23,473; Referee: Marc Bollengier

20 December 2023 17	Paris Saint-Germain	3–1	Metz	Paris
21:00 CET (UTC+1)	Vitinha 49'; K. Mbappé 60', 83'	Report	Hérelle (yellow card) 32'; Udol 72'	Stadium: Parc des Princes; Attendance: 47,822; Referee: Ruddy Buquet

14 January 2024 18	Metz	0–1	Toulouse	Metz
15:00 CET (UTC+1)	Jean Jacques (yellow card) 18'; Sabaly (yellow card) 20'; N'Doram (yellow card) 37'; Hérelle (red card) 72'	Report	Sierro 12' (pen.); Dallinga (yellow card) 40'; Kamanzi (yellow card) 81'	Stadium: Stade Saint-Symphorien; Attendance: 21,065; Referee: Florent Batta

27 January 2024 19	Nice	1–0	Metz	Nice
17:00 CET (UTC+1)	Bard (yellow card) 61'; Guessand 77' (pen.)	Report	Sabaly (yellow card) 57'	Stadium: Allianz Riviera; Attendance: 20,137; Referee: Stéphanie Frappart

4 February 2024 20	Metz	1–2	Lorient	Metz
15:00 CET (UTC+1)	N'Doram (yellow card) 19'; Lamkel Zé 22'; Jean Jacques (yellow card) 77'; Colin (yellow card) 87'	Report	Bamba 19'; Katseris 58'; F. Mendy (yellow card) 90+3'	Stadium: Stade Saint-Symphorien; Attendance: 21,044; Referee: Romain Lissorgue

9 February 2024 21	Marseille	1–1	Metz	Marseille
21:00 CET (UTC+1)	Gigot (red card) 31'; Moumbagna 56'; Onana (yellow card) 82'; Clauss (yellow card) 88'	Report	Udol 61'	Stadium: Stade Vélodrome; Attendance: 62,686; Referee: Hakim Ben El Hadj

18 February 2024 22	Montpellier	3–0	Metz	Montpellier
15:00 CET (UTC+1)	Sylla 3'; Kouyaté (yellow card) 13'; Sagnan (yellow card) 30', (goal) 50'; Omeragić (yellow card) 69'; Savanier 86' (pen.)	Report	Asoro (yellow card) 78'; Candé (yellow card) 83'; Camara (yellow card) 90+4'	Stadium: Stade de la Mosson; Attendance: 12,532; Referee: Jérémy Stinat

23 February 2024 23	Metz	1–2	Lyon	Metz
21:00 CET (UTC+1)	Mikautadze 13'; Camara (yellow card) 81'	Report	Lacazette 45+1'; Benrahma 60'; Mata (yellow card) 73'; O'Brien (yellow card) 87'	Stadium: Stade Saint-Symphorien; Attendance: 27,560; Referee: Marc Bollengier

3 March 2024 24	Nantes	0–2	Metz	Nantes
15:00 CET (UTC+1)	Douglas Augusto (yellow card) 61'; Castelletto (yellow card) 64'; Cozza (yellow card) 68'	Report	Candé (yellow card) 3'; Colin (yellow card) 28'; Mikautadze 58' (pen.); Udol 60'	Stadium: Stade de la Beaujoire; Attendance: 27,132; Referee: Eric Wattellier

10 March 2024 25	Metz	1–0	Clermont	Metz
15:00 CET (UTC+1)	Mikautadze 33' (pen.); Jean Jacques (yellow card) 39'	Report	Matsima (yellow card) 45'; Borges (yellow card) 53'; Gastien (yellow card) 60'	Stadium: Stade Saint-Symphorien; Attendance: 22,673; Referee: Gaël Angoula

17 March 2024 26	Reims	2–1	Metz	Reims
15:00 CET (UTC+1)	Diakité 3', (yellow card) 82'; Itō (yellow card) 21', (goal) 79'; Abdelhamid (yellow card) 51'; Munetsi (yellow card) 73'	Report	Atta 14'; Hérelle (yellow card) 20'; Sabaly (yellow card) 42'; Oukidja (yellow card) 82'; I. Sané (yellow card) 90+1'	Stadium: Stade Auguste-Delaune; Attendance: 14,335; Referee: Hakim Ben El Hadj

30 March 2024 27	Metz	2–5	Monaco	Metz
17:00 CET (UTC+1)	Diallo 78'; I. Sané 84'	Report	Minamino 4'; Akliouche 10'; Vanderson 16'; Balogun 76', 87'	Stadium: Stade Saint-Symphorien; Attendance: 26,661; Referee: Eric Wattellier

7 April 2024 28	Brest	4–3	Metz	Brest
13:00 CEST (UTC+2)	Chardonnet 12'; Doumbia 31'; Mounié 36'; Satriano 60'	Report	Traoré 6'; Udol (yellow card) 62'; Mikautadze 74', 80'	Stadium: Stade Francis-Le Blé; Attendance: 14,656; Referee: Benoît Millot

12 April 2024 29	Metz	2–1	Lens	Metz
21:00 CEST (UTC+2)	Van Den Kerkhof (yellow card) 21'; Mikautadze 34', 45+3'; Traoré (yellow card) 44'	Report	Sotoca 13' (pen.); Gradit (yellow card) 44'; Diouf (yellow card) 45+1'; Machado (yellow card) 46'; Chavez (yellow card) 74'; Frankowski (yellow card) 78'	Stadium: Stade Saint-Symphorien; Attendance: 23,002; Referee: Romain Lissorgue

21 April 2024 30	Le Havre	0–1	Metz	Le Havre
15:00 CEST (UTC+2)	Sangante (yellow card) 21'; Négo (yellow card) 72'; Traoré (yellow card) 44'	Report	N'Doram (yellow card) 16'; Mikautadze 46'; Oukidja (yellow card) 78'; Jean Jacques (yellow card) 84'	Stadium: Stade Océane; Attendance: 21,250; Referee: Marc Bollengier

28 April 2024 31	Metz	1–2	Lille	Metz
13:00 CEST (UTC+2)	Mikautadze 23' (pen.); Lamkel Zé (yellow card) 76'	Report	Ismaily 31'; David (yellow card) 37'; Yazıcı 44'; Bentaleb (yellow card) 51'	Stadium: Stade Saint-Symphorien; Attendance: 24,720; Referee: Stéphanie Frappart

4 May 2024 32	Metz	2–3	Rennes	Metz
19:00 CEST (UTC+2)	Mikautadze 17', (red card) 90+4'; Diallo 45'; Traoré (yellow card) 71'; Hérelle (yellow card) 75'	Report	Gouiri 22'; Truffert (yellow card) 44'; Bourigeaud 73' (pen.); Theate (yellow card) 75'; Kalimuendo 90+3', (yellow card) 90+4'	Stadium: Stade Saint-Symphorien; Attendance: 23,290; Referee: Ruddy Buquet
Note: Mikautadze's red card was later rescinded.

12 May 2024 33	Strasbourg	2–1	Metz	Strasbourg
21:00 CEST (UTC+2)	Emegha 89'; Andrey Santos 90+1', (yellow card) 90+1'; Bellaarouch (yellow card) 90+7'	Report	S. Sané (yellow card) 11'; Mikautadze 54'; Candé (yellow card) 84'	Stadium: Stade de la Meinau; Attendance: 25,686; Referee: François Letexier

19 May 2024 34	Metz	0–2	Paris Saint-Germain	Metz
21:00 CEST (UTC+2)	Jean Jacques (yellow card) 79'; Udol (yellow card) 86'	Report	Soler 7'; Lee 12'; Mendes (yellow card) 44'	Stadium: Stade Saint-Symphorien; Attendance: 28,455; Referee: Gaël Angoula

==== Relegation play-offs ====
30 May 2024 First leg	Saint-Étienne	2–1	Metz	Saint-Étienne
20:30 CEST (UTC+2)	Sissoko 19', (yellow card) 89'; Maçon (yellow card) 34'; Cardona 80'	Report	Traoré 45'; N'Doram (yellow card) 71'	Stadium: Stade Geoffroy-Guichard; Attendance: 35,356; Referee: Benoît Millot

2 June 2024 Second leg	Metz	2–2 (a.e.t.) (3–4 agg.)	Saint-Étienne	Metz
17:00 CEST (UTC+2)	Diallo (red card) 5'; Oukidja (yellow card) 11'; Camara 17'; Mikautadze 25' (pen.), (yellow card) 74'; Udol (yellow card) 81'; N'Doram (yellow card) 85'	Report	Tardieu (yellow card) 15'; Larsonneur (yellow card) 23'; Pétrot 35'; Maçon (yellow card) 99'; Wadji 116'	Stadium: Stade Saint-Symphorien; Attendance: 28,500; Referee: Jérôme Brisard

=== Coupe de France ===
5 January 2024 Round of 64	Metz	1–1 (1–3 p)	Clermont	Metz
20:45 CET (UTC+1)	S. Sané 21'	Report	Allevinah 48'	Stadium: Stade Saint-Symphorien; Attendance: 14,987; Referee: Jérémie Pignard
	Penalties
	Asoro (penalty missed); Diallo (penalty scored); Colin (penalty missed); Kouao (penalty missed)		(penalty scored) Allevinah; (penalty missed) Ogier; (penalty scored) Borges; (penalty scored) Zeffane
