= 2022–23 FC Metz season =

FC Metz
2022–23 season
- President: Bernard Serin
- Head coach: László Bölöni
- Stadium: Stade Saint-Symphorien
- Ligue 2: 2nd (promoted)
- Coupe de France: Round of 64
- Top goalscorer: League: Georges Mikautadze (23); All: Georges Mikautadze (24)
Home colours	Away colours	Third colours

The 2022–23 season was the 91st in the history of FC Metz and their first season back in the second division since 2019. The club participated in Ligue 2 and the Coupe de France.

== Players ==
=== Current squad ===
As of 31 March 2023

Note: Flags indicate national team as defined under FIFA eligibility rules; some limited exceptions apply. Players may hold more than one non-FIFA nationality.

No.	Pos.	Nation	Player
3	DF	FRA	Matthieu Udol
5	DF	GBS	Fali Candé
6	MF	FRA	Kévin N'Doram
8	DF	CIV	Ismaël Traoré
7	FW	SEN	Pape Amadou Diallo
9	FW	GEO	Georges Mikautadze
10	MF	FRA	Youssef Maziz
11	FW	ALB	Xhuliano Skuka
14	MF	SEN	Cheikh Sabaly
15	DF	SEN	Ababacar Lô
16	GK	ALG	Alexandre Oukidja
17	MF	FRA	Lilian Raillot
18	MF	SEN	Lamine Camara
19	MF	CIV	Habib Maïga
20	FW	SEN	Lamine Gueye

No.	Pos.	Nation	Player
21	MF	FRA	Oussmane Kébé
22	DF	MAR	Sofiane Alakouch
24	FW	FRA	Lenny Joseph
25	MF	FRA	Arthur Atta
26	FW	SEN	Malick Mbaye
27	MF	HAI	Danley Jean Jacques
29	FW	FRA	Edouard Soumah-Abbad
30	GK	FRA	Marc-Aurèle Caillard
34	MF	FRA	Joseph N'Duquidi
35	MF	FRA	Maïdine Douane
36	MF	GAM	Ablie Jallow
39	DF	CIV	Koffi Kouao
40	GK	SEN	Ousmane Ba
—	GK	FRA	Alexis Mirbach

=== Out on loan ===
Note: Flags indicate national team as defined under FIFA eligibility rules; some limited exceptions apply. Players may hold more than one non-FIFA nationality.

No.	Pos.	Nation	Player
—	GK	FRA	Guillaume Dietsch (on loan to Seraing)
—	MF	BEL	Sami Lahssaini (on loan to Seraing)
—	MF	CGO	Warren Tchimbembé (on loan to Guingamp)
—	MF	MLI	Boubacar Traoré (on loan to Wolverhampton)

No.	Pos.	Nation	Player
—	FW	CPV	Vagner Gonçalves (on loan to Seraing)
—	FW	SEN	Ibrahima Niane (on loan to Angers)
—	FW	MTN	Pape Ndiaga Yade (on loan to Troyes)

== Pre-season and friendlies ==
Win Draw Loss Fixtures

9 July 2022 Friendly	Metz	2–0	Racing Union	Amnéville
18:00 CEST (UTC+2)	Niane 28' (pen.), 48'			Stadium: Stade Andre Valentin

12 July 2022 Friendly	Sedan	3–3	Metz	Bazeilles
18:00 CEST (UTC+2)				Stadium: Complexe sportif Montvillers

16 July 2022 Friendly	Metz	4–0	Troyes	Homécourt
17:00 CEST (UTC+2)	Candé 39'; Jallow 72'; Gueye 74'; N'Diaye 83'			Stadium: Stade Yvan Tepus

20 July 2022 Friendly	Reims	1–0	Metz	Épernay
18:00 CEST (UTC+2)	Gravillon 79'			Stadium: Stade Paul Chandon

23 July 2022 Friendly	Metz	1–0	Sochaux	Metz
18:00 CEST (UTC+2)	Jallow 2'			Stadium: Stade Saint-Symphorien

9 December 2022 Friendly	Metz	1–5	Auxerre	Marly
--:-- CET (UTC+1)				Stadium: Centre d’entraînement Frescaty

13 December 2022 Friendly	Genk	1–0	Metz	La Nucia, Spain
16:00 CET (UTC+1)	Paintsil 10'
Note: The match consisted of three 35 minute parts

21 December 2022 Friendly	Metz	2–1	SV Elversberg	France
15:00 CET (UTC+1)

23 March 2023 Friendly	Metz	1–1	R.F.C Seraing	Metz
21:00 CEST (UTC+2)				Stadium: Centre d’entraînement de Frescaty

== Competitions ==
=== Overall record ===
Competition	First match	Last match	Starting round	Final position	Record							
Competition	First match	Last match	Starting round	Final position	Pld	W	D	L	GF	GA	GD	Win %
Ligue 2	30 July 2022	2 June 2023	Matchday 1	2nd	38	20	12	6	61	33	+28	52.63
Coupe de France	30 October 2022	7 January 2023	Seventh round	Round of 64	3	2	0	1	4	3	+1	66.67
Total					41	22	12	7	65	36	+29	53.66

Source: Soccerway

=== Ligue 2 ===
==== League table ====
Pos	Team	Pld	W	D	L	GF	GA	GD	Pts	Promotion or Relegation
1	Le Havre (C, P)	38	20	15	3	46	19	+27	75	Promotion to Ligue 1
2	Metz (P)	38	20	12	6	61	33	+28	72	Promotion to Ligue 1
3	Bordeaux	38	20	9	9	51	28	+23	69	
4	Bastia	38	17	9	12	52	45	+7	60	
5	Caen	38	16	11	11	52	43	+9	59	

Source: Ligue 2
Rules for classification: 1) Points; 2) Goal difference; 3) Number of goals scored; 4) Head-to-head goal difference; 5) Fair play points
(C) Champions; (P) Promoted

==== Results summary ====
Overall								Home						Away					
Pld	W	D	L	GF	GA	GD	Pts	W	D	L	GF	GA	GD	W	D	L	GF	GA	GD
38	20	12	6	61	33	+28	72	10	7	2	28	15	+13	10	5	4	33	18	+15

Source: Ligue 2

==== Results by round ====
Round	1	2	3	4	5	6	7	8	9	10	11	12	13	14	15	16	17	18	19	20	21	22	23	24	25	26	27	28	29	30	31	32	33	34	35	36	37	38
Ground	H	A	H	A	H	A	H	H	A	H	A	H	A	H	A	H	A	A	H	A	H	A	H	A	H	A	H	A	H	A	H	A	H	A	H	A	A	H
Result	W	L	W	D	L	W	D	L	L	W	L	D	L	W	W	D	W	W	W	D	D	W	D	D	W	W	D	W	W	D	W	W	D	W	W	D	W	W
Position	2	8	5	5	7	5	7	8	10	9	10	11	12	11	8	10	6	4	3	4	5	4	4	4	4	4	4	4	3	4	3	3	3	3	3	3	2	2

Source: Ligue 2
A = Away; H = Home; W = Win; D = Draw; L = Loss

==== Matches ====
The league fixtures were announced on 17 June 2022.

30 July 2022 1	Metz	3–0	Amiens	Metz
19:00 CEST (UTC+2)	Gueye 21'; Mikautadze 44'; Niane 48'	Report		Stadium: Stade Saint-Symphorien; Attendance: 13,428; Referee: Gaël Angoula

8 August 2022 2	Caen	1–0	Metz	Caen
20:45 CEST (UTC+2)	Diani 38'; Vandermersch (yellow card) 90+3'	Report	Candé (yellow card) 27'; Maïga (yellow card) 29'; Mikautadze (yellow card) 45+3'; Yade (yellow card) 86'	Stadium: Stade Michel d'Ornano; Attendance: 15,360; Referee: Marc Bollengier

13 August 2022 3	Metz	2–0	Valenciennes	Metz
19:00 CEST (UTC+2)	Jallow 29'; Mikautadze 86'	Report		Stadium: Stade Saint-Symphorien; Attendance: 14,253; Referee: Mikael Lesage

20 August 2022 4	Laval	3–3	Metz	Laval
19:00 CEST (UTC+2)	Naidji 33', 75'; Diaw 90+2'	Report	Niane 21'; Mikelbrencis 24'; Udol 35'	Stadium: Stade Francis Le Basser; Attendance: 7,782; Referee: Benjamin Lepaysant

27 August 2022 5	Metz	1–2	Dijon	Metz
15:00 CEST (UTC+2)	Gueye 78'	Report	Silva 29'; Le Bihan 59'	Stadium: Stade Saint-Symphorien; Attendance: 14,257; Referee: Benoît Millot

30 August 2022 6	Rodez	1–4	Metz	Rodez
20:45 CEST (UTC+2)	Depres 69'	Report	Mikautadze 21', 36'; Udol 44'; Maziz 75'	Stadium: Stade Paul-Lignon; Attendance: 1,626; Referee: Romain Lissorgue

2 September 2022 7	Metz	0–0	Annecy	Metz
20:45 CEST (UTC+2)		Report		Stadium: Stade Saint-Symphorien; Attendance: 12,880; Referee: Johan Hamel

12 September 2022 8	Metz	3–6	Guingamp	Metz
20:45 CEST (UTC+2)	Manceau 2' (o.g.); Jallow 10', 16'; Kouyaté (yellow card) 31' (yellow-red card) 31'; Oukidja (red card) 45+3'; Jean Jacques (red card) 56'; Udol (yellow card) 60'; Niane (red card) 90+1'	Report	Livolant 9' (pen.), 88'; Quemper 45+1'; Courtet 45+7' (pen.); Roux (yellow card) 51'; Kiankaulua (yellow card) 66'; Louiserre 69'; Tchimbembé 85'	Stadium: Stade Saint-Symphorien; Attendance: 11,898; Referee: Pierre Gaillouste

17 September 2022 9	Bastia	1–0	Metz	Bastia
19:00 CEST (UTC+2)	Salles-Lamonge 10'; Roncaglia (yellow card) 18'	Report	Maïga (yellow card) 27'; Kouao (yellow card) 79'	Stadium: Stade Armand-Cesari; Attendance: 10,243; Referee: Aurélien Petit

1 October 2022 10	Metz	1–0	Pau	Metz
19:00 CEST (UTC+2)	N'Diaye 11'	Report	Gomis (yellow card) 27'	Stadium: Stade Saint-Symphorien; Attendance: 11,432; Referee: Willy Delajod

8 October 2022 11	Bordeaux	2–0	Metz	Bordeaux
15:00 CEST (UTC+2)	Fransérgio (yellow card) 43' (goal) 90+2'; Maja 45+2' (pen.); Michelin (yellow card) 68'	Report	Maïga (yellow card) 27'	Stadium: Matmut Atlantique; Attendance: 19,266; Referee: (France) Pierre Legat

15 October 2022 12	Metz	0–0	Sochaux	Metz
19:00 CEST (UTC+2)	Jallow (yellow card) 10'	Report	Weissbeck (yellow card) 19'	Stadium: Stade Saint-Symphorien; Referee: Romain Lissorgue

24 October 2022 13	Le Havre	2–0	Metz	Le Havre
20:45 CEST (UTC+2)	Lloris 10'; Alioui 53'	Report		Stadium: Stade Océane; Attendance: 11,832; Referee: Gaël Angoula

7 November 2022 14	Metz	3–2	Saint-Étienne	Metz
20:45 CET (UTC+)	Krasso 18' (o.g.); N'Doram 39'; Udol 61'; Kouyaté (yellow card) 90+2'	Report	Maçon (yellow card) 20'; Wadji 24'; Giraudon (yellow card) 67'; Nadé 90+4'	Stadium: Stade Saint-Symphorien; Attendance: 16,881; Referee: Olivier Thual

12 November 2022 15	Paris	1–4	Metz	Paris
19:00 CET (UTC+)	Chergui (yellow card) 21', (red card) 21'; Guilavogui 28'	Report	Mikautadze 12' (pen.), 23' (pen.), 82'; Gueye 63'; Kouyaté (yellow card) 90+1'	Stadium: Stade Sébastien Charléty; Attendance: 3,957; Referee: Nicolas Rainville

26 December 2022 16	Metz	0–0	Niort	Metz
21:00 CET (UTC+)	Jean Jacques (yellow card) 73'	Report	Zemzemi (yellow card) 90+2'	Stadium: Stade Saint-Symphorien; Attendance: 14,443; Referee: Alexandre Perreau Niel

30 December 2022 17	Grenoble Foot	0–1	Metz	Grenoble
21:00 CET (UTC+)		Report	Candé 52'	Stadium: Stade des Alpes; Attendance: 5,267; Referee: Quentin Guidou

10 January 2023 18	Nîmes	1–4	Metz	Nîmes
20:45 CET (UTC+)	Ahamada 54'	Report	Joseph 48', 60'; Sabaly 56'; Mikautadze 89'	Stadium: Stade des Antonins; Attendance: 1,809; Referee: Mikael Lesage

13 January 2023 19	Metz	2–0	Quevilly-Rouen	Metz
20:45 CET (UTC+)	Jallow 72'; Mikautadze 90+2'	Report	Sidibé (yellow card) 66'	Stadium: Stade Saint-Symphorien; Attendance: 12,542; Referee: Romain Lissorgue

28 January 2023 20	Valenciennes	1–1	Metz	Valenciennes
19:00 CET (UTC+1)	Bonnet 75'	Report	Joseph 90+2'	Stadium: Stade Nungesser; Attendance: 5,303; Referee: Aurélien Petit

31 January 2023 21	Metz	1–1	Rodez	Metz
20:45 CEST (UTC+2)	Jean Jacques (yellow card) 22'; Joseph (yellow card) 40'; Kouao (yellow card) 54'; Mikautadze 63', (yellow card) 74'	Report	Vandenabeele (yellow card) 18'; Mouyokolo (yellow card) 28'; Boissier 79'; Senaya (yellow card) 82'; M'Pasi (red card) 90'	Stadium: Stade Saint-Symphorien; Attendance: 11,442; Referee: Pierre Legat

6 February 2023 22	Amiens	0–2	Metz	Amiens
20:45 CEST (UTC+2)		Report	Mikautadze 55' (pen.); Atta 78'	Stadium: Stade de la Licorne; Attendance: 8,000; Referee: Rémi Landry

13 February 2023 23	Metz	0–0	Caen	Metz
20:45 CEST (UTC+2)		Report		Stadium: Stade Saint-Symphorien; Attendance: 13,790; Referee: Marc Bollengier

18 February 2023 24	Dijon	0–0	Metz	Dijon
19:00 CEST (UTC+2)	Ahlinvi (yellow card) 19'; Fofana (yellow card) 49'	Report	Atta (yellow card) 18'; Maïga (yellow card) 59'; I. Traoré (yellow card) 65'	Stadium: Stade Gaston-Gérard; Attendance: 6,657; Referee: Romain Lissorgue

25 February 2023 25	Metz	2–0	Nîmes	Metz
19:00 CET (UTC+1)	Mikautadze 29'; Maziz 67'	Report	Fofana (yellow card) 31'; De Gevigney (yellow card) 90+1'	Stadium: Stade Saint-Symphorien; Attendance: 13,388; Referee: Aurélien Petit

4 March 2023 26	Annecy	0–3	Metz	Annecy
19:00 CET (UTC+1)		Report	Mikautadze 27', 83'; Maziz 50'	Stadium: Parc des Sports; Attendance: 10,587; Referee: Benjamin Lepaysant

13 March 2023 27	Metz	1–1	Le Havre	Metz
20:45 CET (UTC+1)	Maziz 20'	Report	Sangante (yellow card) 12'; El Hajjam (yellow card) 15'; Lekhal (yellow card) 16'; Kongolo (yellow card) 28'; Richardson 46'; Mbemba (yellow card) 87'	Stadium: Stade Saint-Symphorien; Attendance: 15,395; Referee: Olivier Thual

18 March 2023 28	Quevilly-Rouen	1–2	Metz	Le Petit-Quevilly
19:00 CET (UTC+1)	Camara 90'	Report	Kouao (yellow card) 18'; I. Traoré (yellow card) 65'; Maziz 72'; N'Duquidi (yellow card) 77'; Maïga 80'	Stadium: Stade Robert Diochon; Attendance: 3,600; Referee: Alexandre Perreau Niel

1 April 2023 29	Metz	1–0	Laval	Metz
19:00 CET (UTC+1)	Mikautadze 48'; Maïga (yellow card) 63'	Report	Tavares (yellow card) 51'; Bobichon (yellow card) 85'	Stadium: Stade Saint-Symphorien; Attendance: 15,342; Referee: Rémi Landry

8 April 2023 30	Pau	1–1	Metz	Pau
19:00 CEST (UTC+2)	Begraoui (yellow card) 49'; Ruiz (yellow card) 68'; George 79'	Report	Candé (yellow card) 44'; Prior 58' (o.g.); N'Duquidi (yellow card) 86'	Stadium: Nouste Camp; Attendance: 2,811; Referee: William Toulliou

15 April 2023 31	Metz	3–0	Bordeaux	Metz
15:00 CEST (UTC+2)	Jallow 49'; Mikautadze 52', 72'	Report	Poussin (red card) 40'	Stadium: Stade Saint-Symphorien; Attendance: 23,345; Referee: Gaël Angoula

22 April 2023 32	Saint-Étienne	1–3	Metz	Saint-Étienne
15:00 CEST (UTC+2)	Nkounkou 37'	Report	Mikautadze 10', 26' (pen.); Kouao 12'; Camara (red card) 79'	Stadium: Stade Geoffroy-Guichard; Attendance: 33,008; Referee: Nicolas Rainville

29 April 2023 33	Metz	1–1	Paris	Metz
19:00 CEST (UTC+2)	Mikautadze 18' (pen.)	Report	Guilavogui 13', (yellow card) 78'; Maçon (yellow card) 17'; Lefort (yellow card) 78'	Stadium: Stade Saint-Symphorien; Attendance: 20,900; Referee: Pierre Legat

6 May 2023 34	Niort	1–3	Metz	Niort
19:00 CEST (UTC+2)	Elphege 42'	Report	Mikautadze 45' (pen.), 83'; Maziz 51'; Jean Jacques (yellow card) 70'; Kouao (yellow card) 76'	Stadium: Stade René Gaillard; Attendance: 2,056; Referee: Romain Lissorgue

13 May 2023 35	Metz	1–0	Grenoble	Metz
19:00 CEST (UTC+2)	Jallow 47'	Report	Mendy (yellow card) 8'; Paquiez (yellow card) 62'; Nestor (red card) 71'; Isola (yellow card) 76'	Stadium: Stade Saint-Symphorien; Attendance: 22,157; Referee: Faouzi Benchabane

20 May 2023 36	Guingamp	1–1	Metz	Guingamp
19:00 CEST (UTC+2)	Courtet 60'	Report	Mikautadze 21'; N'Duquidi (yellow card) 41'; Kouao (yellow card) 90+4'	Stadium: Stade de Roudourou; Attendance: 9,163; Referee: Antoine Valnet

26 May 2023 37	Sochaux	0–1	Metz	Montbéliard
20:45 CET (UTC+1)	Meddah (yellow card) 8'; Alvero (red card) 61'; Agouzoul (yellow card) 67'	Report	Sabaly 49'	Stadium: Stade Auguste Bonal; Attendance: 15,714; Referee: Aurélien Petit

2 June 2023 38	Metz	3–2	Bastia	Metz
20:45 CET (UTC+1)	Sabaly 31'; Maziz 55', 75'	Report	Salles-Lamonge (yellow card) 23'; Bohnert 68'; Schur 86'; Kaïboué (yellow card) 90+2'	Stadium: Stade Saint-Symphorien; Attendance: 26,661; Referee: Ruddy Buquet

=== Coupe de France ===
1 November 2022 (Note: Match originally scheduled for 29 October 2022, but postponed by the FFF due to concerns over potential trouble between Metz and Nancy fans.) Seventh round	US Raon-l'Étape	1–2	Metz	Raon-l'Étape
18:00 CET	Hassidou 71'	Report	Musaba 34'; Mikautadze 63'	Stadium: Stade Paul-Gasser; Attendance: 1,899; Referee: Romain Perpiñan

19 November 2022 Eighth round	SAS Épinal	0–1	Metz	Épinal
		Report	Joseph 87'	Stadium: Stade de la Colombière; Attendance: 2,106

7 January 2023 Round of 64	Olympique Lyonnais	2–1	Metz	Rhône
	Barcola 60'; Candé 77' (o.g.)	Report	Jallow 63'	Stadium: Parc Olympique Lyonnais
