= Boubacar Traoré (footballer, born 2001) =

Malian footballer

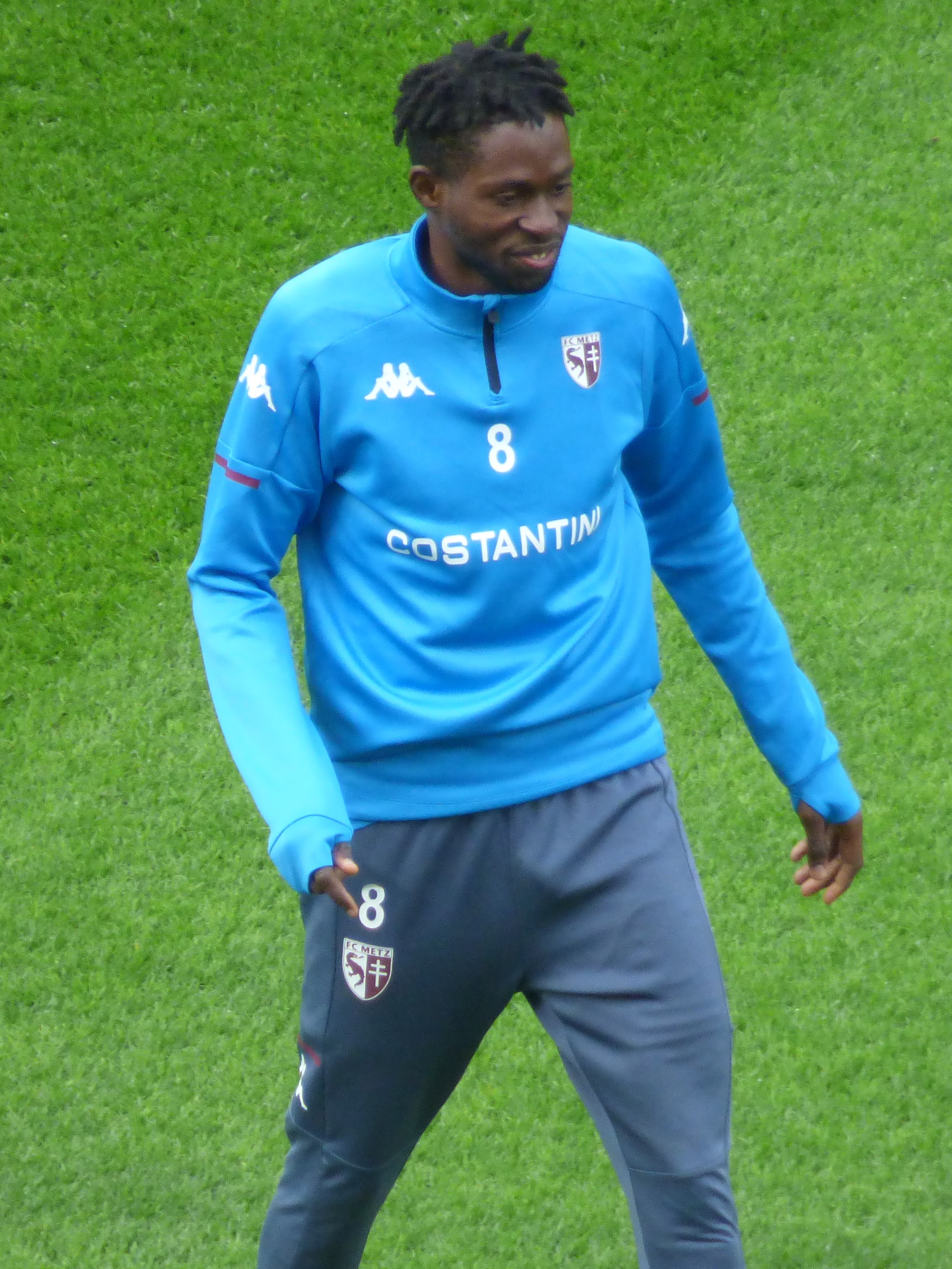
- Traoré with Metz in 2021

Personal information
- Full name: Boubacar Traoré
- Date of birth: 20 August 2001 (age 25)
- Place of birth: Bamako, Mali
- Height: 1.83 m (6 ft 0 in)
- Position: Defensive midfielder

Team information
- Current team: Wolverhampton Wanderers
- Number: 12

Youth career
- –2019: AS de Bamako
- 2019–2020: Metz

Senior career*
Years	Team	Apps	(Gls)
2019–2023	Metz II	6	(0)
2021–2023	Metz	32	(2)
2022–2023	→ Wolverhampton Wanderers (loan)	10	(0)
2023–	Wolverhampton Wanderers	25	(0)
2025–2026	→ Metz (loan)	20	(1)

International career^{‡}
2019	Mali U20	9	(2)
2019–	Mali Olympic	13	(2)
2022–	Mali	4	(0)
Medal record
Representing Mali
U-20 Africa Cup of Nations
Gold medal – first place	Niger 2019	U-20 Team
U-23 Africa Cup of Nations
Bronze medal – third place	Morocco 2023	U-23 Team
- * Club domestic league appearances and goals as of 17 May 2026 ‡ National team caps and goals as of 30 July 2024

Boubacar Traoré (born 20 August 2001) is a Malian professional footballer who plays as a defensive midfielder for EFL Championship club Wolverhampton Wanderers and the Mali national team.

== Club career ==
Boubacar Traoré made his professional debut for FC Metz on 10 May 2021, coming as a substitute of Kévin N'Doram in a Ligue 1 home game against Nîmes.

Traoré made a deadline day move to Wolverhampton Wanderers on 1 September 2022, on a season-long loan deal with an option to buy in the summer of 2023.

Traoré made his Wolves debut in a 3–0 home defeat to Manchester City in the Premier League on 17 September 2022.

Traoré scored his first goal for Wolves in a home EFL Cup game against Premier League rivals Leeds United to win the game 1–0 on 9 November 2022.

On 1 February 2023, Wolves announced that Traoré's performances for the club had triggered a clause in his loan agreement that would make his move to Wolves permanent, effective 1 July 2023.

== International career ==
Traoré made his debut for the Mali senior national team in a friendly 1–1 tie with Algeria on 16 November 2022.

In June 2023, he was included in the final squad of the Malian under-23 national team for the 2023 U-23 Africa Cup of Nations, hosted in Morocco, where the Eagles finished in third place and qualified for the 2024 Summer Olympics in Paris.

== Personal life ==
Traoré also holds French citizenship.

== Career statistics ==
=== Club ===
As of match played 17 May 2026

Appearances and goals by club, season and competition
Club	Season	League			National cup (Note: Includes Coupe de France, FA Cup)		League cup (Note: Includes EFL Cup)		Continental		Total	
Club	Season	Division	Apps	Goals	Apps	Goals	Apps	Goals	Apps1!Goals1!Apps	Goals		
Metz II	2019–20	Championnat National 3	6	0	—		—		—		6	0
Metz	2020–21	Ligue 1	2	1	0	0	—		—		2	1
Metz	2021–22	Ligue 1	27	1	1	0	—		—		28	1
Metz	2022–23	Ligue 2	3	0	—		—		—		3	0
Metz	Total		32	2	1	0	—		—		33	2
Wolverhampton Wanderers (loan)	2022–23	Premier League	10	0	0	0	1	1	—		11	1
Wolverhampton Wanderers	2023–24	Premier League	24	0	1	0	2	0	—		27	0
Wolverhampton Wanderers	2024–25	Premier League	1	0	1	0	1	0	—		3	0
Wolverhampton Wanderers	Wolves total		35	0	2	0	4	1	—		41	1
Metz (loan)	2025–26	Ligue 1	20	1	2	2	—		—		22	3
Career total			93	3	5	2	4	1	0	0	102	6

=== International ===
As of match played 3 February 2022

Appearances and goals by national team and year
National team	Year	Apps	Goals
Mali	2022	1	0
Mali	2024	3	0
Total		4	0

== Honours ==
Mali U20

- U-20 Africa Cup of Nations: 2019

Mali U23

- U-23 Africa Cup of Nations bronze medal: 2023
