= Malick Mbaye (footballer, born 2004) =

Senegalese footballer (born 2004)

Personal information
- Date of birth: 6 April 2004 (age 22)
- Place of birth: Dakar, Senegal
- Height: 1.73 m (5 ft 8 in)
- Position: Forward

Team information
- Current team: Zulte Waregem
- Number: 10

Youth career
- Génération Foot

Senior career*
Years	Team	Apps	(Gls)
2021–2023	Génération Foot	20	(2)
2023–2026	Metz B	26	(8)
2023–2026	Metz	12	(0)
2025	→ Amiens (loan)	12	(5)
2026–	Zulte Waregem	6	(1)

International career^{‡}
2023–	Senegal	6	(0)
- * Club domestic league appearances and goals as of 11 May 2026 ‡ National team caps and goals as of 20:16, 12 November 2023 (UTC)

Malick Mbaye (born 6 April 2004) is a Senegalese professional footballer who plays as a forward for Belgian Pro League club Zulte Waregem.

== Club career ==
In February 2023, Mbaye signed for French side Metz. Following the move, he was quoted as saying he was "very happy to join this great club". He made his unofficial debut for the club, scoring his side's only goal in a 1–1 friendly draw with RFC Seraing.

On 3 February 2025, Mbaye was loaned by Amiens.

On 2 February 2026, Mbaye signed a three-and-a-half-year contract with Zulte Waregem in Belgium.

== International career ==
Mbaye represented Senegal at the 2022 African Nations Championship, where he impressed as Senegal won the tournament for the first time.

== Career statistics ==
=== Club ===
As of match played 4 January 2026

Appearances and goals by club, season and competition
Club	Season	League			Cup		Other		Total	
Club	Season	Division	Apps	Goals	Apps	Goals	Apps	Goals	Apps	Goals
Génération Foot	2021–22	Senegal Ligue 1	19	2	0	0	0	0	19	2
Génération Foot	2022–23	Senegal Ligue 1	1	0	0	0	0	0	1	0
Génération Foot	Total		20	2	0	0	0	0	20	2
Metz B	2022–23	CFA 2	6	2	—		—		6	2
Metz B	2023–24	National 3	11	3	—		—		11	3
Metz B	2024–25	National 3	7	0	—		—		7	0
Metz B	Total		24	5	—		—		24	5
Metz	2022–23	Ligue 2	2	0	0	0	—		2	0
Metz	2023–24	Ligue 1	5	0	1	0	0	0	6	0
Metz	2024–25	Ligue 1	0	0	1	0	0	0	1	0
Metz	2025–26	Ligue 1	4	0	1	0	—		5	0
Metz	Total		11	0	3	0	0	0	14	0
Amiens (loan)	2024–25	Ligue 2	12	5	—		—		12	5
Career total			66	12	3	0	0	0	69	12

=== International ===
As of match played 7 April 2023

Appearances and goals by national team and year
National team	Year	Apps	Goals
Senegal	2023	6	0
Total		6	0
