= Koffi Kouao =

Ivorian footballer (born 1998)

Personal information
- Full name: Koffi Franck Kouao
- Date of birth: 20 May 1998 (age 28)
- Place of birth: Abidjan, Ivory Coast
- Height: 1.73 m (5 ft 8 in)
- Positions: Left-back; centre-back

Team information
- Current team: Neftchi Fergana
- Number: 52

Youth career
- –2016: ASEC Mimosas
- 2016: Vizela

Senior career*
Years	Team	Apps	(Gls)
2017–2022	Vizela	80	(5)
2017–2018	→ Moreirense (loan)	9	(0)
2018–2019	→ Famalicão (loan)	6	(0)
2022–2026	Metz	102	(3)
2026–	Neftchi	4	(1)

International career
2019–2021	Ivory Coast U23	5	(0)
- * Club domestic league appearances and goals as of 4 September 2026

Koffi Franck Kouao (born 20 May 1998) is an Ivorian professional footballer who plays as a left-back or centre-back for Uzbekistan Super League club Neftchi Fergana

== Club career ==
Kouao made his professional debut in the Segunda Liga for Vizela on 28 January 2017 in a game against Desportivo das Aves.

On 12 August 2022, Kouao signed a four-year contract with Metz in France.

== Career statistics ==
As of 10 May 2026

Appearances and goals by club, season and competition
Club	Season	League			Cup		Other (Note: Includes Taça da Liga, Ligue 1 relegation/promotion play-offs)		Total	
Club	Season	Division	Apps	Goals	Apps	Goals	Apps	Goals	Apps	Goals
Vizela	2016–17	Liga Portugal 2	7	0	0	0	1	0	8	0
Vizela	2018–19	Campeonato de Portugal	6	0	0	0	—		6	0
Vizela	2019–20	Campeonato de Portugal	19	1	0	0	—		19	1
Vizela	2020–21	Liga Portugal 2	24	2	1	0	—		25	2
Vizela	2021–22	Primeira Liga	24	2	2	0	—		26	2
Vizela	Total		80	5	3	0	1	0	84	5
Moreirense (loan)	2017–18	Primeira Liga	9	0	4	0	2	0	15	0
Famalicão (loan)	2018–19	Liga Portugal 2	6	0	0	0	—		6	0
Metz	2022–23	Ligue 2	33	1	3	0	—		36	1
Metz	2023–24	Ligue 1	13	0	1	0	1 (Note: Appearances in Ligue 1 relegation/promotion play-offs)	0	15	0
Metz	2024–25	Ligue 2	29	0	2	0	3	0	34	0
Metz	2025–26	Ligue 1	27	2	1	0	0	0	28	2
Metz	Total		102	3	7	0	4	0	113	3
Career total			197	8	14	0	7	0	218	8

== Honours ==
Ivory Coast U23

- Africa U-23 Cup of Nations runner-up: 2019
