= Papa Amadou Diallo =

Senegalese footballer (born 2004)

Personal information
- Full name: Papa Amadou Diallo
- Date of birth: 25 June 2004 (age 22)
- Place of birth: Saint-Louis, Senegal
- Height: 1.82 m (6 ft 0 in)
- Position: Winger

Team information
- Current team: Norwich City
- Number: 19

Youth career
- Génération Foot

Senior career*
Years	Team	Apps	(Gls)
2021–2023	Génération Foot	20	(1)
2023–2025	Metz B	10	(3)
2023–2025	Metz	45	(9)
2025–	Norwich City	10	(0)

International career^{‡}
	Senegal U20		(7)
2022–	Senegal	6	(2)
Medal record
Men's football
Representing Senegal
African Nations Championship
Winner	2022
U-20 Africa Cup of Nations
Winner	2023
- * Club domestic league appearances and goals as of 16:57, 15 August 2026 (UTC) ‡ National team caps and goals as of 14:28 27 March 2023 (UTC)

Papa Amadou Diallo (born 25 June 2004) is a Senegalese professional footballer who plays as a winger for EFL Championship club Norwich City.

== Club career ==
In February 2023, Diallo signed for French side Metz. He made his Ligue 1 debut for Metz on 3 September 2023 against Reims.

On 24 July 2025, Diallo signed for Championship club Norwich City on an initial four-year deal for an undisclosed fee, reported to be £4.3 million.

== International career ==
=== Youth ===
Diallo was called up to the Senegalese under-20 side for the 2023 Africa U-20 Cup of Nations. Diallo scored two goals against Mozambique and went on to defeat The Gambia in the finals to win the tournament for the first time.

=== Senior ===
Diallo scored two goals at the 2022 African Nations Championship, as Senegal went on to win the competition for the first time.

== Career statistics ==
=== Club ===
As of match played 15 August 2026

Appearances and goals by club, season and competition
Club	Season	League			National Cup (Note: Includes Coupe de France, FA Cup)		League Cup (Note: EFL Cup)		Other		Total	
Club	Season	Division	Apps	Goals	Apps	Goals	Apps	Goals	Apps	Goals	Apps	Goals
Génération Foot	2021–22	Senegal Premier League	19	1	—		—		0	0	19	1
Génération Foot	2022–23	Senegal Premier League	1	0	—		—		0	0	1	0
Génération Foot	Total		20	1	—		—		0	0	20	1
Metz B	2022–23	Championnat National 2	4	3	—		—		—		4	3
Metz B	2023–24	Championnat National 3	6	0	—		—		—		6	0
Metz B	Total		10	3	—		—		—		10	3
Metz	2022–23	Ligue 2	1	0	0	0	—		—		1	0
Metz	2023–24	Ligue 1	16	2	1	0	—		2 (Note: Appearances in the Ligue 1 relegation/promotion play-offs)	0	19	2
Metz	2024–25	Ligue 2	28	7	0	0	—		3	0	31	7
Metz	Total		45	9	1	0	—		5	0	51	9
Norwich City	2025–26	EFL Championship	9	0	0	0	2	0	—		11	0
Norwich City	2026–27	EFL Championship	1	0	0	0	0	0	—		1	0
Norwich City	Total		10	0	0	0	2	0	—		12	0
Career total			85	13	1	0	2	0	5	0	93	13

=== International ===
As of match played 24 February 2023

Appearances and goals by national team and year
National team	Year	Apps	Goals
Senegal	2023	6	2
Total		6	2

Scores and results list Senegal's goal tally first, score column indicates score after each Diallo goal.

List of international goals scored by Pape Amadou Diallo
No.	Date	Venue	Opponent	Score	Result	Competition
1	22 January 2023	19 May 1956 Stadium, Annaba, Algeria	DR Congo	2–0	3–0	2022 African Nations Championship
3	31 January 2023	Nelson Mandela Stadium, Algiers, Algeria	Madagascar	1–0	1–0	2022 African Nations Championship
