= Pape Matar Sarr =

Senegalese footballer (born 2002)

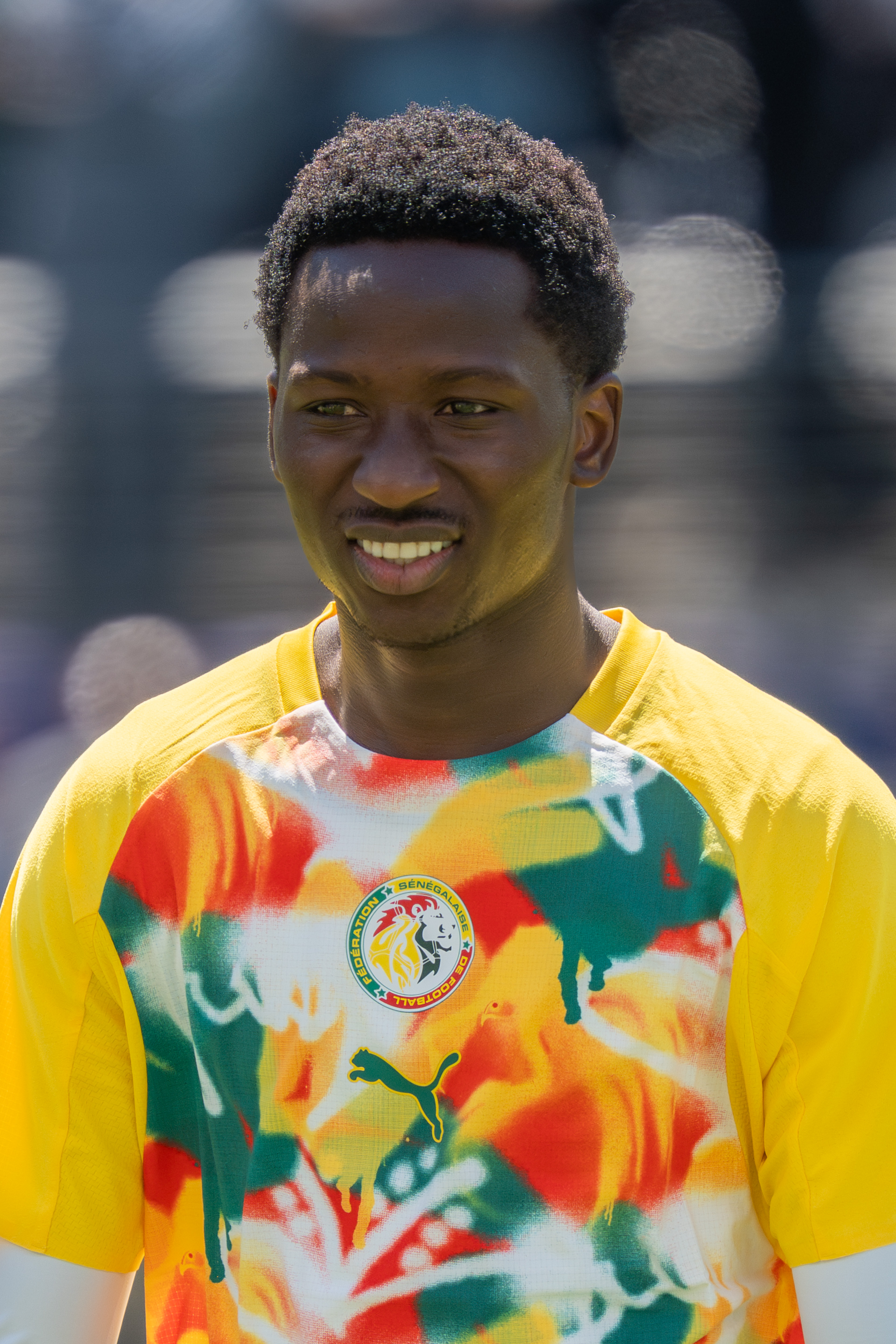
- Sarr with Senegal in 2026

Personal information
- Full name: Pape Matar Sarr
- Date of birth: 14 September 2002 (age 24)
- Place of birth: Thiaroye, Senegal
- Height: 1.85 m (6 ft 1 in)
- Position: Midfielder

Team information
- Current team: Juventus (on loan from Tottenham Hotspur)
- Number: 29

Youth career
- 2015–2020: Génération Foot

Senior career*
Years	Team	Apps	(Gls)
2020–2021	Metz	22	(3)
2021–	Tottenham Hotspur	107	(8)
2021–2022	→ Metz (loan)	33	(1)
2026–	→ Juventus (loan)	7	(0)

International career^{‡}
2018–2019	Senegal U17	6	(3)
2021–	Senegal	46	(4)
Medal record
Men's football
Representing Senegal
Africa Cup of Nations
Winner	2021 Cameroon
Runner-up	2025 Morocco
- * Club domestic league appearances and goals as of 23:05, 22 November 2026 (UTC) ‡ National team caps and goals as of 23:45, 16 November 2026 (UTC)

Pape Matar Sarr (French pronunciation: [pap matɑʁ sɑʁ]; born 14 September 2002) is a Senegalese professional footballer who plays as a midfielder for Serie A club Juventus, on loan from Premier League club Tottenham Hotspur, and the Senegal national team.

== Club career ==
=== Metz ===
Pape Matar Sarr made his professional debut with Génération Foot in his native country of Senegal, before signing a five-year contract with Ligue 1 side Metz on 15 September 2020.

Sarr was initially sent to play for Metz's second team in Championnat National 2, but made only one appearance before he was recalled to the first team squad following the season being halted due to the COVID-19 pandemic in France. He made his debut for the Metz first team on 29 November 2020 in a Ligue 1 game against Brest. On 31 January 2021, Sarr scored his first goal in Ligue 1 in the reverse fixture, a 4–2 away victory over Brest.

=== Tottenham Hotspur ===
On 27 August 2021, Sarr signed for Premier League club Tottenham Hotspur. He was loaned back to Metz until the end of the 2021–22 season. On 1 January 2023, Sarr finally made his long-awaited Premier League debut coming on as an 80th-minute substitute for Yves Bissouma in a 2–0 home loss to Aston Villa. Since his first appearance against Aston Villa, Sarr has featured regularly for Spurs, either coming off the bench or starting. He got his first goal contribution, an assist on 28 May 2023, in the last game of the season, a 4–1 away win at Leeds United. On 19 August 2023, Sarr scored his first goal for Tottenham Hotspur on their first home game of the 2023–24 Premier League season, a 2–0 win against Manchester United.

On 2 January 2024, after a run of impressive performances, Sarr extended his contract with Tottenham until 2030.

Sarr provided the cross prior to Brennan Johnson's opening goal in the 2025 Europa League Final, which Tottenham would go on to win 1–0, earning Sarr the first major club honour of his career.

==== Loan to Juventus ====
On 1 September 2026, Sarr joined Serie A club Juventus on a loan until the end of the season.

== International career ==
Sarr made his debut for Senegal national team on 26 March 2021 in an AFCON 2021 qualifier against Congo. On 6 February 2022, he won the 2021 Africa Cup of Nations with Senegal. He made one appearance at the tournament, appearing as a substitute in the 3–1 semi-final win over Burkina Faso.

He was appointed a Grand Officer of the National Order of the Lion by President of Senegal, Macky Sall following the nation's victory at the 2021 Africa Cup of Nations. On 21 July, he was named CAF's Male Young Player of the Year at the 2022 CAF Awards.

Sarr was included in Senegal's squad for the 2022 FIFA World Cup, where he appeared as a substitute in the team's 3–1 group stage win over Qatar and 3–0 round of 16 loss to England.

On 18 November 2023, he scored his first senior international goal in a 4–0 win over South Sudan in a 2026 FIFA World Cup qualifier.

In December 2023, Sarr was named in Senegal's squad for the postponed 2023 Africa Cup of Nations held in the Ivory Coast.

On 21 May 2026, Sarr was selected by Senegal's coach Pape Thiaw in the 26-man squad for the 2026 FIFA World Cup.

== Career statistics ==
=== Club ===
As of match played 22 November 2026

Appearances and goals by club, season and competition
Club	Season	League			National cup (Note: Includes Coupe de France, FA Cup, Coppa Italia)		League cup (Note: Includes EFL Cup)		Europe		Other		Total	
Club	Season	Division	Apps	Goals	Apps	Goals	Apps	Goals	Apps	Goals	Apps	Goals	Apps	Goals
Metz II	2020–21	Championnat National 2	1	0	—		—		—		—		1	0
Metz	2020–21	Ligue 1	22	3	3	1	—		—		—		25	4
Metz	2021–22 (Note: On loan from Tottenham Hotspur)	Ligue 1	33	1	1	0	—		—		—		34	1
Metz	Total		55	1	4	1	—		—		—		59	5
Tottenham Hotspur	2022–23	Premier League	11	0	2	0	0	0	1 (Note: Appearance(s) in UEFA Champions League)	0	—		14	0
Tottenham Hotspur	2023–24	Premier League	34	3	0	0	1	0	—		—		35	3
Tottenham Hotspur	2024–25	Premier League	36	3	2	0	4	1	13 (Note: Appearances in UEFA Europa League)	2	—		55	6
Tottenham Hotspur	2025–26	Premier League	26	2	0	0	1	0	9	0	1 (Note: Appearance in UEFA Super Cup)	0	37	2
Tottenham Hotspur	Total		107	8	4	0	6	1	23	2	1	0	141	11
Juventus (loan)	2026–27	Serie A	7	0	0	0	—		3	0	—		10	0
Career total			170	11	8	1	6	1	26	2	1	0	211	15

=== International ===
As of match played 16 November 2026

Appearances and goals by national team and year
National team	Year	Apps	Goals
Senegal	2021	4	0
Senegal	2022	8	0
Senegal	2023	6	1
Senegal	2024	11	0
Senegal	2025	8	3
Senegal	2026	9	0
Total		46	4

Scores and results list Senegal's goal tally first, score column indicates score after each Sarr goal.

List of international goals scored by Pape Matar Sarr
No.	Date	Venue	Opponent	Score	Result	Competition
1	18 November 2023	Diamniadio Olympic Stadium, Diamniadio, Senegal	South Sudan	1–0	4–0	2026 FIFA World Cup qualification
2	25 March 2025	Diamniadio Olympic Stadium, Diamniadio, Senegal	Togo	1–0	2–0	2026 FIFA World Cup qualification
3	5 September 2025	Diamniadio Olympic Stadium, Diamniadio, Senegal	Sudan	2–0	2–0	2026 FIFA World Cup qualification
4	9 September 2025	Stade des Martyrs, Kinshasa, DR Congo	DR Congo	3–2	3–2	2026 FIFA World Cup qualification

== Honours ==
Tottenham Hotspur

- UEFA Europa League: 2024–25

Senegal

- Africa Cup of Nations: 2021

Individual

- CAF Youth Player of the Year: 2022
