= Joseph Nduquidi =

Footballer (born 2004)

Personal information
- Date of birth: 31 October 2004 (age 22)
- Place of birth: Forbach, France
- Height: 1.87 m (6 ft 2 in)
- Position: Central midfielder

Team information
- Current team: Farense
- Number: 15

Youth career
- 2011–2017: Forbach
- 2017–2021: Metz

Senior career*
Years	Team	Apps	(Gls)
2021–2026	Metz B	41	(3)
2022–2026	Metz	38	(0)
2025–2026	→ Amiens (loan)	22	(0)
2026–	Farense	4	(0)

International career^{‡}
2023–2024	France U20	3	(0)
Medal record
Men's football
Representing Angola
COSAFA Cup
Winner	2024 South Africa
- * Club domestic league appearances and goals as of 30 August 2026 ‡ National team caps and goals as of 23 May 2024

Joseph Nduquidi Diazongua Nfingui (born 31 October 2004) is a professional footballer who plays as a central midfielder for Portuguese club Farense. Born in France, he represents Angola at international level.

== Club career ==
Nduquidi joined the youth academy of his local club Forbach at the age of 7, and moved to Metz in 2013. He started training for their reserves in 2021, and their senior team in 2022. He made his senior debut with Metz as a late substitute in a 3–0 Ligue 2 win over Amiens on 30 July 2022.

On 1 September 2025, Nduquidi was loaned by Amiens in Ligue 2.

== International career ==
Nduquidi was a youth international for France at under-20 level.

In May 2024, Nduquidi received his first call-up to the Angola national team.

== Personal life ==
Born in France, Nduquidi is of Angolan descent.

== Career statistics ==
As of match played 17 August 2025

Appearances and goals by club, season and competition
Club	Season	League			Coupe de France		Other		Total	
Club	Season	Division	Apps	Goals	Apps	Goals	Apps	Goals	Apps	Goals
Metz B	2021–22	CFA 2	26	2	—		—		26	2
Metz B	2022–23	CFA 2	5	1	—		—		5	1
Metz B	2023–24	National 3	4	0	—		—		4	0
Metz B	2024–25	National 3	6	0	—		—		6	0
Metz B	Total		41	3	—		—		41	3
Metz	2022–23	Ligue 2	14	0	2	0	—		16	0
Metz	2023–24	Ligue 1	13	0	0	0	0	0	13	0
Metz	2024–25	Ligue 2	10	0	0	0	0	0	10	0
Metz	2025–26	Ligue 1	1	0	0	0	0	0	1	0
Metz	Total		38	0	2	0	0	0	40	0
Career total			79	3	2	0	0	0	81	3
