= Georges Mikautadze =

Georgia international footballer (born 2000)

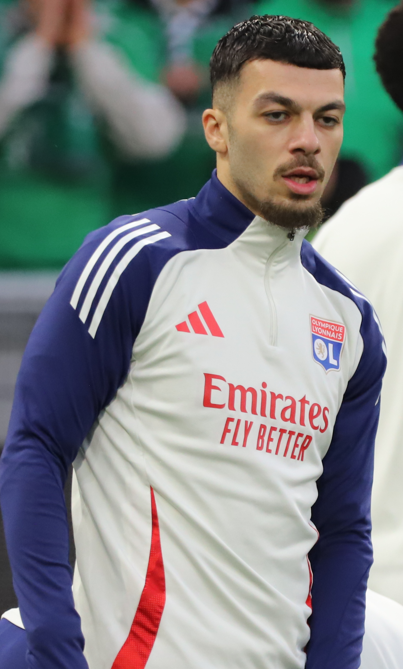
- Mikautadze with Lyon in 2025

Personal information
- Date of birth: 31 October 2000 (age 26)
- Place of birth: Lyon, France
- Height: 1.76 m (5 ft 9 in)
- Position: Forward

Team information
- Current team: Villarreal
- Number: 9

Youth career
- 2007–2008: FC Gerland
- 2008–2015: Lyon
- 2015–2016: Saint-Priest
- 2016–2018: Metz

Senior career*
Years	Team	Apps	(Gls)
2018–2020	Metz B	23	(9)
2019–2023	Metz	42	(25)
2020–2022	→ Seraing (loan)	49	(28)
2023–2024	Ajax	5	(0)
2024	→ Metz (loan)	20	(13)
2024	Metz	0	(0)
2024–2025	Lyon	36	(12)
2025–	Villarreal	45	(16)

International career^{‡}
2021–	Georgia	49	(23)
- * Club domestic league appearances and goals as of 14:51, 22 November 2026 (UTC) ‡ National team caps and goals as of 21:45, 17 November 2026 (UTC)

Georges Mikautadze (Order of Honor) (Georgian: გიორგი მიქაუტაძე, romanized: giorgi mikaut'adze; born 31 October 2000) is a professional footballer who plays as a forward for La Liga club Villarreal. Born in France, he plays for the Georgia national team.

== Club career ==
=== Early career ===
Mikautadze took his first steps in football at FC Gerland before joining the Lyon youth academy. In 2016, he moved to Metz's football academy.

=== Metz ===
==== 2019–20: Debut season ====
Mikautadze made his professional debut with Metz in a 4–1 Ligue 1 loss to Nice on 7 December 2019. On 10 December 2019, he signed a four-year deal with Metz, which was his first professional contract. He struggled to make an impact in his first senior season, playing mostly for the reserve team.

==== 2020–2022: Loans to Seraing ====
In June 2020, Mikautadze was one of six Metz players to join Belgian First Division B side Seraing on loan. After his first nine matches with Seraing, he had scored 15 times, including four on his debut against Lommel. Overall, with 19 goals he became a joint topscorer of the season. He netted three goals in an aggregate 6–3 play-off victory over Waasland-Beveren. For his contribution to Seraing's successful league campaign, Mikautadze was named in Team of the Season and was awarded the Métallo d'Or, the title annually given to the best Seraing player, after the fans had voted for him.

On 30 August 2021, he returned to Seraing on another loan, with the club now promoted to the Belgian top tier. The team ended up in the relegation zone, although it remained in the league due to the only goal scored by Mikautadze in the play-offs against Molenbeek.

==== 2022–23: Return from loan, Ligue 2 top scorer ====
In the summer of 2022, Mikautadze returned to Metz. After being a nominee for the award in August, by March 2023 Mikautadze was the leading goalscorer of the league, and the National Union of Professional Players (UNPF) named him Player of the Month. Having added nine more goals in April and May, he was selected in Team of the Week six times in a row during this period. By the end of the season he was the top goalscorer and best player of the league.

With Metz promoted to Ligue 1 in 2023–24, Mikautadze started the new season by scoring twice against Marseille and Clermont and providing an assist in the opening game against Rennes.

=== Ajax ===
On 30 August 2023, Eredivisie club Ajax announced the signing of Mikautadze on a five-year contract for a reported fee of €16 million, potentially rising to €19 million with add-ons. He made his debut, starting and playing the full game, in a 0–0 draw away at Fortuna Sittard. Mikautadze made his European debut in Ajax's 2–0 defeat against Brighton & Hove Albion at the Amsterdam Arena. During the first half of the 2023–24 campaign, Mikautadze made just nine appearances in all competitions for Ajax, failing to score a goal.

=== Return to Metz ===
On 4 January 2024, Mikautadze returned to Metz, arriving on loan from Ajax until the end of the 2023–24 season. The deal included an option-to-buy, reported to be around €13 million.

He failed to score in his first five games, but then netted ten in as many matches, scoring his first goal since returning to the club in a 2–1 defeat to Lyon as well as a brace in a vital 2–1 win over Lens, another goal against Clermont, a penalty against Nantes, a brace in a 4–3 defeat to Champions League-chasing Brest, the only goal in a 1–0 win over Le Havre, a penalty in a 2–1 defeat to Lille and a lob over Steve Mandanda in a 3–2 defeat against Rennes where Mikautadze got a controversial red card which was overturned by appeal. In mid-April, Get French Football News found it incredible that a player with only 15 appearances in Metz's 29 matches accounted for 30% of the goals scored by the team.

Three times during this season, namely in August, February and April, Mikautadze was voted Player of the Month by Metz fans. He eventually concluded the second half of the 2023–24 season by scoring 13 goals in 20 matches; however, his team was relegated following their defeat in the playoffs against Saint-Étienne.

=== Lyon ===
On 18 July 2024, despite Metz having reached an agreement with Monaco previously, Mikautadze refused to join Monaco and signed for his former club Lyon on a four-year deal, for €18.5 million, with €4.5 million in potential bonuses and a 15% sell-on clause. He chose to have the number 69 on his jersey as it is the number of the Rhône department, of which Lyon is the préfecture.

One month later, on 18 August 2024, he played in his first game for Lyon, a 3–0 defeat away to Rennes. Mikautadze opened his goal-scoring account with a brace in a 2–2 draw against Auxerre on 27 October 2024.

On 28 November 2024, on the fifth matchday of the 2024–25 UEFA Europa League league phase, he scored two goals in a 4–1 victory over Qarabağ, his first goals in European competitions.

=== Villarreal ===
On 1 September 2025, Mikautadze was transferred to Villarreal, signing a six-year contract with the Spanish side, where he chose to wear Number 9. On 20 September, he scored his first goal in a 2–1 win against Osasuna. On 1 October, he netted his first goal in the UEFA Champions League against Juventus in a 2–2 away draw.

In February 2026, Mikautadze was named LaLiga Player of the Month after scoring three times and providing one assist in four successive matches. He finished the season as the team topscorer with 13 league goals and also became the most prolific player of the Spanish top league among its debutants this season.

== International career ==
Mikautadze received a first call-up for the Georgia national team from French coach Willy Sagnol in March 2021. He told the press that he had been dreaming about playing for Georgia since his childhood.

Mikautadze made his debut with the Georgia national team in a 1–0 2022 FIFA World Cup qualification loss to Sweden on 25 March 2021. In June 2021, he netted his first international goal in a 2–1 away friendly win against Romania. On 12 October 2023, Mikautadze scored four goals, his first international hat-trick and poker, in an 8–0 win against Thailand, the record win of the Georgia national team.

During Georgia's UEFA Euro 2024 qualifying campaign, Mikautadze scored three goals in ten matches (including the play-offs), recording two against Cyprus and an equaliser against Norway, contributing to his country's first-ever qualification to a major tournament. He would then be selected in Georgia's 26-man squad for the final tournament in Germany. On 18 June, Mikautadze scored his nation's first goal in the European competition, by netting the equaliser against Turkey in Georgia's opening match, which ended in a 3–1 defeat. Four days later, he scored a penalty in his side's second group match, a 1–1 draw against the Czech Republic. On 26 June, Mikautadze scored another penalty in a 2–0 victory over Portugal, securing his nation's qualification to the knockout stage as one of the best third-placed teams, and concluding the group stage as top scorer in the competition with three goals in total. Following the conclusion of the tournament, Mikautadze finished level with five other players on three goals, and thus shared the top scorer award.

In 2024, Mikautadze was awarded the Order of Honor by the President of Georgia following the debut performance of the Georgia National Team at the Euro 2024.

== Personal life ==
Mikautadze's family moved from Georgia to France in the late 1990s. Mikautadze was born and raised in France, and made regular visits to Georgia during the summers. He grew up speaking Georgian at home, having been taught by his parents.

== Career statistics ==
=== Club ===
As of match played 22 November 2026

Appearances and goals by club, season and competition
Club	Season	League			National cup (Note: Includes Coupe de France, Belgian Cup, KNVB Cup, Copa del Rey)		Europe		Other		Total	
Club	Season	Division	Apps	Goals	Apps	Goals	Apps	Goals	Apps	Goals	Apps	Goals
Metz B	2018–19	Championnat National 3	6	1	—		—		—		6	1
Metz B	2018–19	Régional 1			—		—		—			
Metz B	2019–20	Championnat National 3	17	8	—		—		—		17	8
Metz B	Total		23	9	—		—		—		23	9
Metz	2019–20	Ligue 1	1	0	—		—		0	0	1	0
Metz	2020–21	Ligue 1	1	0	—		—		—		1	0
Metz	2022–23	Ligue 2	37	23	3	1	—		—		40	24
Metz	Total		39	23	3	1	—		0	0	41	24
Seraing (loan)	2020–21	Belgian First Division B	21	19	1	0	—		2 (Note: Appearances in Belgian First Division B promotion play-offs)	3	24	22
Seraing (loan)	2021–22	Belgian Pro League	28	9	3	4	—		2 (Note: Appearances in Belgian Pro League relegation play-offs)	1	33	14
Seraing (loan)	Total		49	28	4	4	—		4	4	57	36
Ajax	2023–24	Eredivisie	6	0	1	0	2 (Note: Appearances in UEFA Europa League)	0	—		9	0
Metz (loan)	2023–24	Ligue 1	20	13	0	0	—		2 (Note: Appearances in Ligue 1 relegation/promotion play-offs)	1	22	14
Lyon	2024–25	Ligue 1	34	11	2	2	11	4	—		47	17
Lyon	2025–26	Ligue 1	2	1	—		—		—		2	1
Lyon	Total		36	12	2	2	11	4	—		49	18
Villarreal	2025–26	La Liga	32	13	3	1	7 (Note: Appearances in UEFA Champions League)	1	—		42	15
Villarreal	2026–27	La Liga	14	3	0	0	4	2	—		18	5
Villarreal	Total		45	16	3	1	11	3	—		59	20
Career total			218	101	13	8	24	7	6	5	261	121

=== International ===
As of match played 17 November 2026

Appearances and goals by national team and year
National team	Year	Apps	Goals
Georgia	2021	7	1
Georgia	2022	6	1
Georgia	2023	9	7
Georgia	2024	13	7
Georgia	2025	6	5
Georgia	2026	8	2
Total		49	23

Scores and results list Georgia's goal tally first, score column indicates score after each Mikautadze goal.

List of international goals scored by Georges Mikautadze
No.	Date	Venue	Opponent	Score	Result	Competition
1	2 June 2021	Ilie Oană Stadium, Ploiești, Romania	Romania	1–0	2–1	Friendly
2	2 June 2022	Boris Paichadze Dinamo Arena, Tbilisi, Georgia	Gibraltar	3–0	4–0	2022–23 UEFA Nations League C
3	28 March 2023	Batumi Stadium, Batumi, Georgia	Norway	1–1	1–1	UEFA Euro 2024 qualifying
4	17 June 2023	AEK Arena, Larnaca, Cyprus	Cyprus	1–0	2–1	UEFA Euro 2024 qualifying
5	12 October 2023	Mikheil Meskhi Stadium, Tbilisi, Georgia	Thailand	3–0	8–0	Friendly
6	12 October 2023	Mikheil Meskhi Stadium, Tbilisi, Georgia	Thailand	4–0	8–0	Friendly
7	12 October 2023	Mikheil Meskhi Stadium, Tbilisi, Georgia	Thailand	5–0	8–0	Friendly
8	12 October 2023	Mikheil Meskhi Stadium, Tbilisi, Georgia	Thailand	7–0	8–0	Friendly
9	15 October 2023	Mikheil Meskhi Stadium, Tbilisi, Georgia	Cyprus	4–0	4–0	UEFA Euro 2024 qualifying
10	9 June 2024	Podgorica City Stadium, Podgorica, Montenegro	Montenegro	2–0	3–1	Friendly
11	18 June 2024	Westfalenstadion, Dortmund, Germany	Turkey	1–1	1–3	UEFA Euro 2024
12	22 June 2024	Volksparkstadion, Hamburg, Germany	Czech Republic	1–0	1–1	UEFA Euro 2024
13	26 June 2024	Arena AufSchalke, Gelsenkirchen, Germany	Portugal	2–0	2–0	UEFA Euro 2024
14	7 September 2024	Mikheil Meskhi Stadium, Tbilisi, Georgia	Czech Republic	3–0	4–1	2024–25 UEFA Nations League B
15	16 November 2024	Batumi Stadium, Batumi, Georgia	Ukraine	1–1	1–1	2024–25 UEFA Nations League B
16	19 November 2024	Andrův stadion, Olomouc, Czech Republic	Czech Republic	1–2	1–2	2024–25 UEFA Nations League B
17	20 March 2025	Vazgen Sargsyan Republican Stadium, Yerevan, Armenia	Armenia	2–0	3–0	2024–25 UEFA Nations League promotion/relegation play-offs
18	20 March 2025	Vazgen Sargsyan Republican Stadium, Yerevan, Armenia	Armenia	3–0	3–0	2024–25 UEFA Nations League promotion/relegation play-offs
19	23 March 2025	Boris Paichadze Dinamo Arena, Tbilisi, Georgia	Armenia	2–0	6–1	2024–25 UEFA Nations League promotion/relegation play-offs
20	23 March 2025	Boris Paichadze Dinamo Arena, Tbilisi, Georgia	Armenia	5–0	6–1	2024–25 UEFA Nations League promotion/relegation play-offs
21	7 September 2025	Boris Paichadze Dinamo Arena, Tbilisi, Georgia	Bulgaria	3–0	3–0	2026 FIFA World Cup qualification
22	29 March 2026	Darius and Girėnas Stadium, Kaunas, Lithuania	Lithuania	1–0	2–0	Friendly
23	29 March 2026	Darius and Girėnas Stadium, Kaunas, Lithuania	Lithuania	2–0	2–0	Friendly

== Honours ==
Individual

- Belgian First Division B top scorer: 2020–21 (shared)
- Ligue 2 top scorer: 2022–23
- Ligue 2 Player of the Year: 2022–23
- UNFP Ligue 2 Team of the Year: 2022–23
- UEFA European Championship top scorer: 2024 (shared)
- La Liga Player of the Month: February 2026
