= Manuel Cabit =

Martiniquais footballer (born 1993)

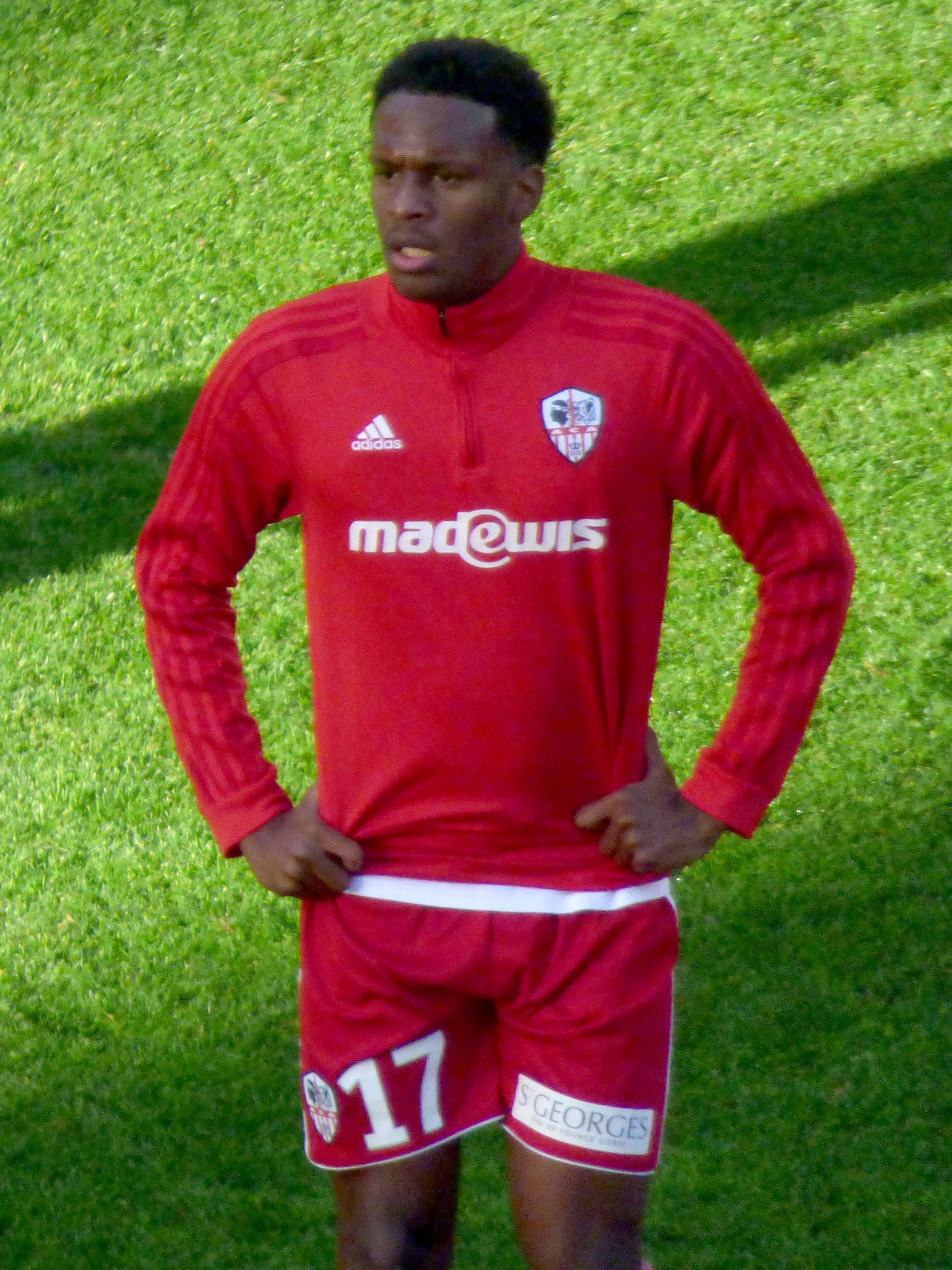
- Cabit in 2018

Personal information
- Full name: Manuel Frédéric Cabit
- Date of birth: 3 June 1993 (age 33)
- Place of birth: Fort-de-France, Martinique, France
- Height: 1.82 m (6 ft 0 in)
- Position: Left-back

Youth career
- 2007–2012: Sochaux

Senior career*
Years	Team	Apps	(Gls)
2012–2013	Aubervilliers	10	(0)
2013	Chambly	0	(0)
2014–2015	Belfort	33	(1)
2015–2016	Béziers	20	(1)
2016–2019	Ajaccio	76	(0)
2016–2017	Ajaccio B	5	(0)
2019–2022	Metz	3	(0)
- * Club domestic league appearances and goals

Manuel Frédéric Cabit (born 3 June 1993) is a Martiniquais former professional footballer who played as a left-back.

In June 2017, he received a call up to the Martinique national team's preliminary 2017 CONCACAF Gold Cup squad, but was left out the final roster.

== Club career ==
After making his semi-professional debut in the French lower divisions for Aubervilliers, he moved to Chambly before a spell with Belfort and Béziers.

=== Ajaccio ===
Cabit joined full professional team AC Ajaccio on 21 July 2016. He made his professional debut in the following weeks, in a 2–1 Ligue 2 victory against Troyes.

During the 2017–18 season, his impressive form helped Ajaccio reach the Ligue 2 promotion playoffs final, however the club lost against Ligue 1 side Toulouse in the final over two legs in May 2018, for Toulouse to remain in Ligue 1.

=== Metz ===
Cabit moved to Metz on 13 June 2019 on a three-year contract. In November 2019 he was seriously injured in a car crash which also involved team-mate Kévin N'Doram, who was not hurt. He never played for Metz for the remainder of his contract and retired after it expired.

== International career ==
Cabit is eligible to represent both Martinique national football team and France national football team.

In June 2017, he was called up to a 40-man preliminary squad for Martinique national football team for the 2017 CONCACAF Gold Cup, however he was left out of the final 23 man squad.
