= Kévin N'Doram =

French footballer (born 1996)

Personal information
- Full name: Kévin N'Doram
- Date of birth: 22 January 1996 (age 30)
- Place of birth: Saint-Sébastien-sur-Loire, France
- Height: 1.84 m (6 ft 0 in)
- Positions: Defensive midfielder; centre-back

Youth career
- 2001–2016: Monaco

Senior career*
Years	Team	Apps	(Gls)
2014–2018	Monaco B	50	(1)
2016–2020	Monaco	20	(0)
2019–2020	→ Metz (loan)	20	(0)
2020–2024	Metz	70	(1)
2024–2026	Al-Kholood	52	(1)

International career
2017	France U21	2	(0)
- * Club domestic league appearances and goals as of 20:49, 30 October 2024 (UTC)

Kévin N'Doram (born 22 January 1996) is a French professional footballer who plays as a defensive midfielder and centre-back.

== Club career ==
Born in France to Chadian parents,N'Doram is a youth exponent from Monaco. He made his league debut on 20 August 2016 in a 1–0 away win over Nantes. He played the full game. N'Doram scored his first goal on 2 February 2017 in a Coupe de France round of 32 match against Chambly.

In November 2019, N'Doram was injured in a car crash which also involved team-mate Manuel Cabit, who was seriously hurt.

On 4 June 2020, N’Doram completed a permanent transfer to Metz for a fee of €4 million. He signed a four-year contract.

== Personal life ==
N'Doram's father Japhet N'Doram is a Chadian former footballer.

== Career statistics ==
As of match played 2 June 2024

Appearances and goals by club, season and competition
Club	Season	League			National cup		League cup		Continental		Other		Total	
Club	Season	Division	Apps	Goals	Apps	Goals	Apps	Goals	Apps	Goals	Apps	Goals	Apps	Goals
Monaco B	2013–14	CFA	6	0	—		—		—		—		6	0
Monaco B	2014–15	CFA	2	0	—		—		—		—		2	0
Monaco B	2015–16	CFA	24	0	—		—		—		—		24	0
Monaco B	2016–17	CFA	12	1	—		—		—		—		12	0
Monaco B	2017–18	National 2	2	0	—		—		—		—		2	0
Monaco B	2018–19	National 2	4	0	—		—		—		—		4	0
Monaco B			50	1	—		—		—		—		50	1
Monaco	2016–17	Ligue 1	5	0	2	1	0	0	1 (Note: Appearance(s) in the UEFA Champions League)	0	—		8	1
Monaco	2017–18	Ligue 1	11	0	2	0	2	0	1	0	0	0	16	0
Monaco	2018–19	Ligue 1	4	0	0	0	0	0	1	0	0	0	5	0
Monaco	Total		20	0	4	1	2	0	3	0	0	0	29	1
Metz (loan)	2019–20	Ligue 1	20	0	1	0	1	0	—		—		22	0
Metz	2020–21	Ligue 1	6	0	0	0	—		—		—		6	0
Metz	2021–22	Ligue 1	19	0	0	0	—		—		—		19	0
Metz	2022–23	Ligue 2	22	1	2	0	—		—		—		24	1
Metz	2023–24	Ligue 1	23	0	1	0	—		—		2 (Note: Appearances in the Ligue 1 relegation/promotion play-offs)	0	26	0
Metz	Total		70	1	3	0	—		—		2	0	75	2
Metz B	2022–23	National 2	2	0	—		—		—		—		2	0
Career total			162	2	8	1	3	0	3	0	2	0	178	3

== Honours ==
Monaco

- Ligue 1: 2016–17
- Coupe de la Ligue runner-up: 2016–17, 2017–18
