= Ibrahima Niane =

Senegalese footballer (born 1999)

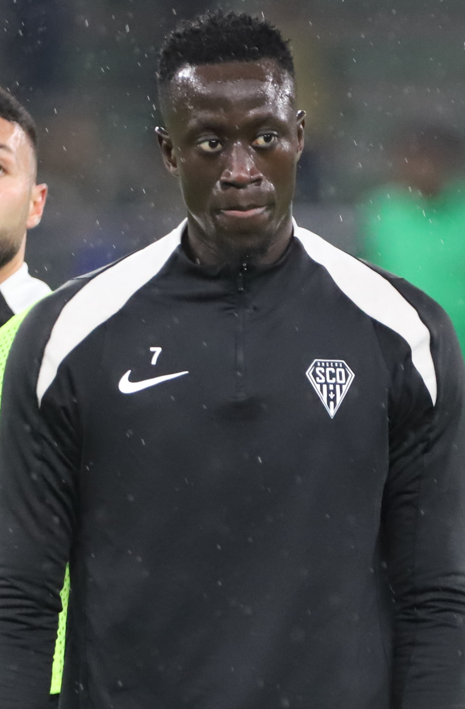
- Niane with Angers in 2025

Personal information
- Full name: Ibrahima Niane
- Date of birth: 11 March 1999 (age 27)
- Place of birth: M'Bour, Senegal
- Height: 1.87 m (6 ft 2 in)
- Position: Forward

Youth career
- Génération Foot

Senior career*
Years	Team	Apps	(Gls)
2017–2019	Metz B	4	(1)
2017–2023	Metz	133	(26)
2023	→ Angers (loan)	16	(2)
2023–2025	Angers	54	(3)

International career
2017–2019	Senegal U20	13	(6)
Medal record
Men's football
Representing Senegal
African U-20 Championship
Silver medal – second place	2017 Zambia
- * Club domestic league appearances and goals as of 25 May 2025

Ibrahima Niane (born 11 March 1999) is a Senegalese professional footballer who plays as a forward.

== Club career ==
On 31 January 2023, Niane joined Angers in Ligue 1 on loan with an option to buy.

== Honours ==
Metz

- Ligue 2: 2018–19

Individual

- UNFP Ligue 1 Player of the Month: September 2020

== Career statistics ==
As of match played 17 May 2024

Appearances and goals by club, season and competition
Club	Season	League			National cup		League cup		Total	
Club	Season	Division	Apps	Goals	Apps	Goals	Apps	Goals	Apps	Goals
Metz B	2017–18	National 3	3	1	—		—		3	1
Metz B	2018–19	National 3	1	0	—		—		1	0
Metz B	Total		4	1	—		—		4	1
Metz	2017–18	Ligue 1	30	2	3	3	2	0	35	5
Metz	2018–19	Ligue 2	33	10	5	2	3	2	41	14
Metz	2019–20	Ligue 1	21	3	0	0	1	1	22	4
Metz	2020–21	Ligue 1	10	6	0	0	—		10	6
Metz	2021–22	Ligue 1	26	3	1	0	—		27	3
Metz	2022–23	Ligue 2	13	2	1	0	—		14	2
Metz	Total		133	26	10	5	6	3	149	34
Angers (loan)	2022–23	Ligue 1	16	2	1	0	—		17	2
Angers	2023–24	Ligue 2	30	0	2	1	—		32	1
Angers	Total		46	2	3	1	—		49	3
Career total			183	29	13	6	6	3	202	38
