= Aboubacar Lô =

Senegalese footballer (born 2000)

Personal information
- Full name: Aboubacar Moustapha Lô
- Date of birth: 2 January 2000 (age 26)
- Place of birth: Dakar, Senegal
- Height: 1.87 m (6 ft 2 in)
- Position: Centre-back

Team information
- Current team: Laval

Youth career
- –2019: Génération Foot

Senior career*
Years	Team	Apps	(Gls)
2019–2025	Metz B	23	(0)
2020–2021	→ Seraing (loan)	0	(0)
2021–2022	→ Cholet (loan)	28	(6)
2023–2025	Metz	27	(0)
2025–2026	Amiens	25	(1)
2026–	Laval	0	(0)
- * Club domestic league appearances and goals as of 12 May 2026

Aboubacar Moustapha Lô (born 2 January 2000) is a Senegalese professional footballer who plays as a centre-back for Ligue 2 club Laval.

== Career ==
Lô was born in Dakar in Senegal. He began his career at Génération Foot before signing for Ligue 1 club Metz in 2019. He initially played with the reserve team in the 2019–20 season, winning the Group F of the Championnat National 3. In the 2020–21 season, Lô played for Belgian First Division B club Seraing on loan, making one appearance.

On 21 July 2021, Lô signed for Championnat National club Cholet on loan until the end of the 2021–22 season.

On 24 June 2026, Lô joined Laval in Ligue 2 for three seasons.

== Career statistics ==
As of match played 10 May 2025

Appearances and goals by club, season and competition
Club	Season	League			National cup		Continental		Other		Total	
Club	Season	Division	Apps	Goals	Apps	Goals	Apps	Goals	Apps	Goals	Apps	Goals
Génération Foot	2017–18	Senegal Ligue 1	—		—		1 (Note: Appearances in CAF Champions League)	0	—		1	0
Génération Foot	2018–19	Senegal Ligue 1	—		—		3	0	—		3	0
Génération Foot	Total		—		—		4	0	—		4	0
Metz B	2019–20	National 3	13	0	—		—		—		13	0
Metz B	2022–23	National 3	3	0	—		—		—		3	0
Metz B	2023–24	National 3	6	0	—		—		—		6	0
Metz B	2024–25	National 3	1	0	—		—		—		1	0
Metz B	Total		23	0	—		—		—		23	0
Seraing (loan)	2020–21	Challenger Pro League	0	0	0	0	—		—		0	0
Cholet (loan)	2021–22	CFA	28	6	4	0	—		—		32	6
Metz	2022–23	Ligue 2	5	0	0	0	—		—		5	0
Metz	2023–24	Ligue 1	6	0	0	0	—		—		6	0
Metz	2024–25	Ligue 2	16	0	3	0	—		0	0	19	0
Metz	Total		27	0	3	0	—		—		30	0
Career total			80	6	7	0	3	0	0	0	90	6

== Honours ==
Metz B

- Championnat National 3: 2019–20
