= Guillaume Dietsch =

French footballer (born 2001)

Personal information
- Full name: Guillaume Laurent Dietsch
- Date of birth: 17 April 2001 (age 25)
- Place of birth: Forbach, France
- Height: 1.84 m (6 ft 0 in)
- Position: Goalkeeper

Youth career
- 2007–2009: Lixing-lès-Rouhling
- 2009–2012: Alsting Zinzing
- 2012–2014: Forbach
- 2014–2020: Metz

Senior career*
Years	Team	Apps	(Gls)
2018–2024	Metz B	16	(0)
2020–2023	→ Seraing (loan)	82	(0)
2023–2024	Metz	1	(0)
2024–2026	Dender EH	18	(0)

International career
2016–2017	France U16	7	(0)
2018–2019	France U18	5	(0)
2019–2020	France U19	4	(0)
2022	France U21	1	(0)
- * Club domestic league appearances and goals as of 11 May 2026

Guillaume Laurent Dietsch (born 17 April 2001) is a French professional footballer who plays as a goalkeeper.

== Career statistics ==
As of match played 5 November 2023

Appearances and goals by club, season and competition
Club	Season	League			Cup		Other		Total	
Club	Season	Division	Apps	Goals	Apps	Goals	Apps	Goals	Apps	Goals
Metz B	2017–18	Championnat National 3	2	0	—		—		2	0
Metz B	2019–20	Championnat National 3	13	0	—		—		13	0
Metz B	2023–24	Championnat National 3	1	0	—		—		1	0
Metz B	Total		16	0	—		—		16	0
Seraing (loan)	2020–21	Belgian First Division B	26	0	0	0	2 (Note: Appearances in the Belgian First Division A promotion-relegation play-off)	0	28	0
Seraing (loan)	2021–22	Belgian First Division A	33	0	1	0	2	0	36	0
Seraing (loan)	2022–23	Belgian Pro League	23	0	1	0	0	0	24	0
Seraing (loan)	Total		82	0	2	0	4	0	88	0
Metz	2023–24	Ligue 1	1	0	0	0	0	0	1	0
Career total			99	0	2	0	4	0	105	0
