= Warren Tchimbembé =

Footballer (born 1998)

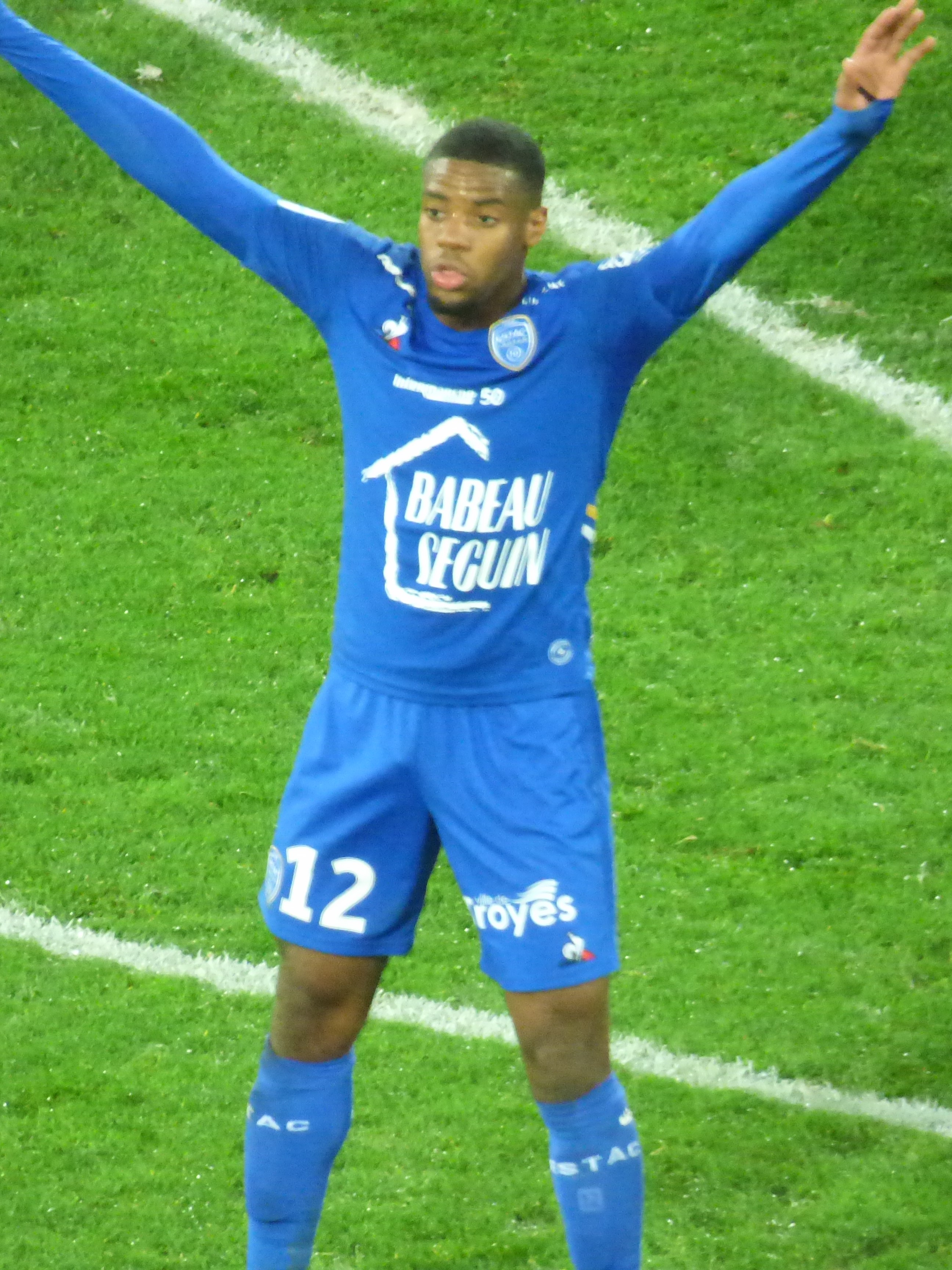
- Tchimbembé playing for Troyes in 2020

Personal information
- Full name: Warren Christopher Paul-Roger Tchimbembé
- Date of birth: 21 April 1998 (age 28)
- Place of birth: Gonesse, France
- Height: 1.86 m (6 ft 1 in)
- Position: Midfielder

Team information
- Current team: Quevilly-Rouen
- Number: 8

Youth career
- 2005–2010: Gonesse
- 2010–2011: Puiseux-Louvres
- 2011–2013: Sarcelles
- 2013–2018: Troyes

Senior career*
Years	Team	Apps	(Gls)
2015–2019	Troyes B	74	(22)
2018–2020	Troyes	19	(3)
2020–2024	Metz	25	(0)
2021–2024	Metz B	7	(1)
2022	→ Mirandés (loan)	6	(0)
2022–2023	→ Guingamp (loan)	21	(1)
2023	→ Guingamp B (loan)	1	(0)
2025–2026	Vardar	7	(1)
2026	Chauray	14	(0)
2026–	Quevilly-Rouen	5	(0)

International career^{‡}
2021–	Congo	3	(0)
- * Club domestic league appearances and goals as of 5 September 2026 ‡ National team caps and goals as of 20:02, 3 June 2024 (UTC)

Warren Christopher Paul-Roger Tchimbembé (born 21 April 1998) is a professional footballer who plays as a midfielder for Ligue 3 club Quevilly-Rouen. Born in France, he plays for the Congo national team and for FK Vardar Skopje.

== Club career ==
On 22 May 2018, Tchimbembé signed his first professional contract with Troyes for three years. He made his professional debut with the club in a 2–1 Ligue 2 loss to Brest on 3 August 2018.

On 23 July 2020, Tchimbembé signed a four-year contract with Ligue 1 side Metz. On 28 January 2022, he signed for Segunda División club Mirandés on loan for the rest of the 2021–22 season. On 2 August 2022, Tchimbembé moved on loan to Guingamp, with an option to buy.

== International career ==
Born in France, Tchimbembé is of Republic of the Congo descent. He debuted with the Congo national team in a 1–1 2022 FIFA World Cup qualification tie with Togo on 9 October 2021.
