= Ousmane Ba =

Senegalese footballer (born 2002)

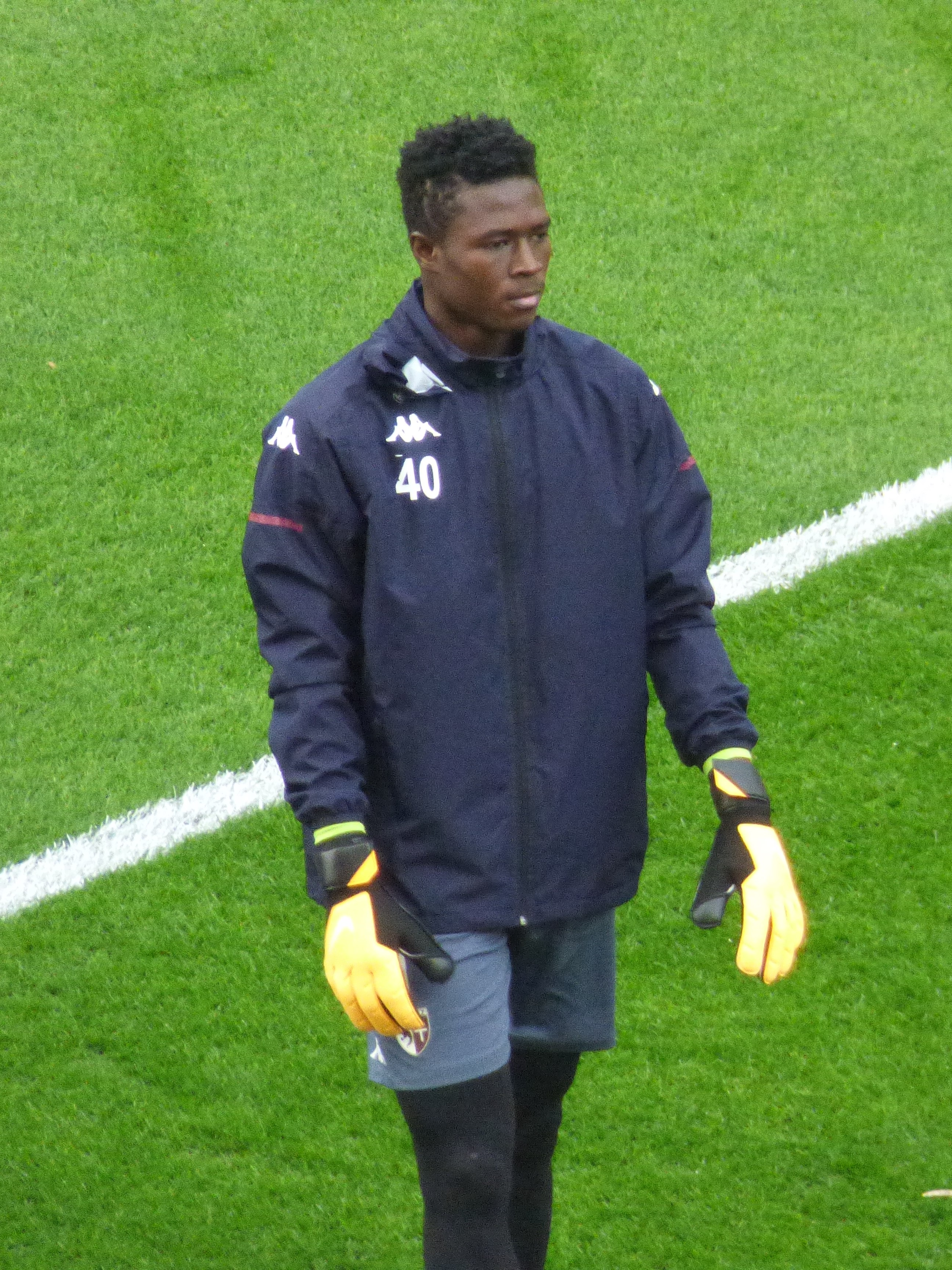

Personal information
- Date of birth: 6 June 2002 (age 24)
- Place of birth: Rufisque, Senegal
- Height: 1.85 m (6 ft 1 in)
- Position: Goalkeeper

Team information
- Current team: Metz
- Number: 40

Youth career
- Génération Foot

Senior career*
Years	Team	Apps	(Gls)
2020–2025	Metz B	19	(0)
2021–	Metz	5	(0)
2023–2024	→ Cholet (loan)	16	(0)
2024–2025	→ Seraing (loan)	5	(0)

International career^{‡}
2019	Senegal U17	4	(0)
2022–	Senegal U23	2	(0)
- * Club domestic league appearances and goals as of 14 December 2025 ‡ National team caps and goals as of 22 September 2022

Ousmane Ba (born 6 June 2002) is a Senegalese professional footballer who plays as a goalkeeper for Ligue 2 club Metz.

== Club career ==
Ba is a youth product of the Senegalese youth academy Génération Foot.

On 16 September 2020, he joined Metz B.

On 7 October 2020, he signed a contract until 2025 with Metz. On 10 September 2025, it was announced that Ba had signed a two-year extension to his contract, keeping him at the club until June 2027.

== International career ==
Ba made his international debut for the Senegal U-23 in a 4–0 win against Morocco U-23 on 22 September 2022.

== Career statistics ==
As of match played 11 January 2026

Appearances and goals by club, season and competition
Club	Season	League			Cup		Other		Total	
Club	Season	Division	Apps	Goals	Apps	Goals	Apps	Goals	Apps	Goals
Metz B	2021–22	CFA 2	15	0	—		—		15	0
Metz B	2022–23	CFA 2	2	0	—		—		2	0
Metz B	2025–26	CFA 3	2	0	—		—		2	0
Metz B	Total		19	0	—		—		19	0
Metz	2022–23	Ligue 2	5	0	—		—		5	0
Metz	2025–26	Ligue 1	0	0	2	0	—		2	0
Metz	Total		5	0	2	0	—		7	0
Cholet (loan)	2023–24	CFA	16	0	0	0	—		16	0
Seraing (loan)	2024–25	Challenger Pro League	5	0	1	0	—		6	0
Career total			45	0	3	0	0	0	48	0
