= Mathieu Cachbach =

Belgian footballer

Personal information
- Date of birth: 23 May 2001 (age 25)
- Place of birth: Arlon, Belgium
- Height: 1.81 m (5 ft 11 in)
- Position: Midfielder

Team information
- Current team: Villefranche
- Number: 13

Senior career*
Years	Team	Apps	(Gls)
2019–2022	Metz B	16	(1)
2021–2022	Metz	1	(0)
2021–2022	→ Seraing (loan)	19	(0)
2022–2025	Seraing	85	(3)
2025–2026	Olympic Charleroi	31	(0)
2026–	Villefranche	5	(2)
- * Club domestic league appearances and goals as of 5 September 2026

Mathieu Cachbach (born 23 May 2001) is a Belgian professional footballer who plays as a midfielder for Ligue 3 club Villefranche.

== Club career ==
On 31 August 2022, Cachbach returned to Seraing on a permanent basis and signed a two-year contract.

== Honours ==
Metz B

- Championnat National 3: 2019–20
