= Maïdine Douane =

French footballer (born 2002)

Personal information
- Date of birth: 23 August 2002 (age 24)
- Place of birth: Thionville, France
- Height: 1.77 m (5 ft 10 in)
- Position: Attacking midfielder

Team information
- Current team: Clermont Foot
- Number: 11

Youth career
- 2007: AS Konacker
- 2008–2010: FC Florange
- 2012: ES Fameck
- 2013–2016: Thionville
- 2016–2021: Metz

Senior career*
Years	Team	Apps	(Gls)
2020–2024	Metz B	21	(1)
2022	→ Seraing (loan)	6	(0)
2022–2024	Metz	2	(0)
2023–2024	→ Seraing (loan)	19	(2)
2024–	Clermont Foot	39	(5)
- * Club domestic league appearances and goals as of 12 May 2026

Maïdine Douane (born 23 August 2002) is a French professional footballer who plays as an attacking midfielder for Clermont Foot.

== Personal life ==
Douane was born in Thionville, in the northeast of France. He holds French and Algerian nationalities.
