= Lamine Gueye (footballer) =

Senegalese footballer (born 1998)

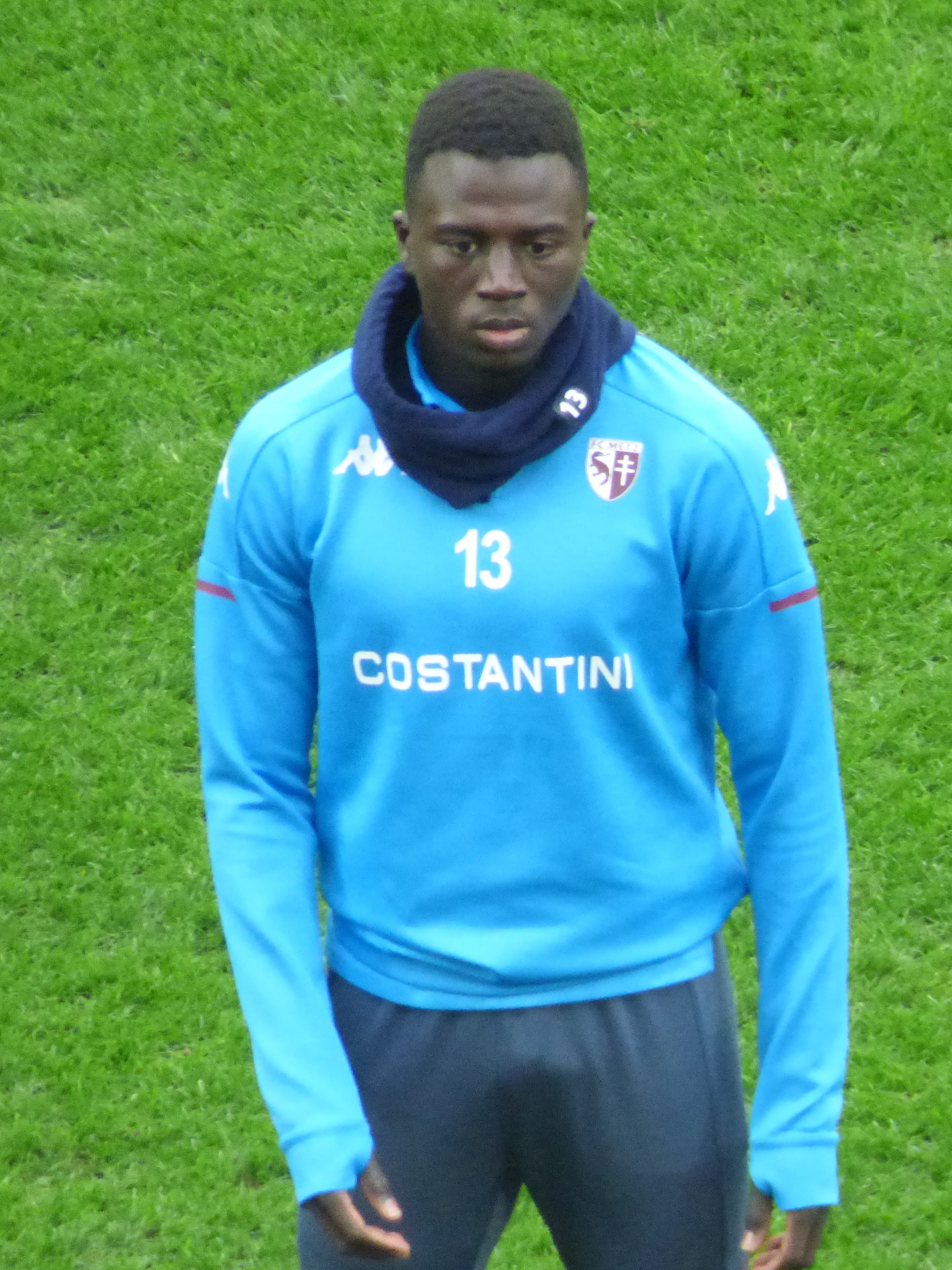
- Gueye with Metz in 2021

Personal information
- Full name: Mamadou Lamine Gueye
- Date of birth: 13 March 1998 (age 28)
- Place of birth: M'Bour, Senegal
- Height: 1.78 m (5 ft 10 in)
- Position: Forward

Youth career
- –2017: Génération Foot

Senior career*
Years	Team	Apps	(Gls)
2017–2020	Génération Foot		
2018–2020	→ Pau (loan)	50	(22)
2018	→ Pau B (loan)	1	(0)
2020–2023	Metz B	4	(0)
2020–2023	Metz	69	(6)
2022	→ Paris FC (loan)	4	(2)
2023–2026	Paris FC	2	(0)
- * Club domestic league appearances and goals as of 17 May 2026

Mamadou Lamine Gueye (born 13 March 1998) is a Senegalese professional footballer who plays as a forward.

== Career ==
Gueye made his Ligue 1 debut for Metz on 13 September 2020 in a 1–0 away defeat against Lille. He was to join Ligue 2 side Paris FC on loan in October 2020 but the transfer was cancelled due to an administrative regulation disallowing a loan inside the country.

On 25 January 2022, Gueye was loaned to Paris FC until the end of the season.
