= 2021–22 US Quevilly-Rouen Métropole season =

US Quevilly-Rouen Métropole
2021–22 season
- Chairman: Michel Mallet
- Manager: Fabien Mercadal
- Stadium: Stade Robert Diochon
- Ligue 2: 18th
- Coupe de France: Round of 32
- Top goalscorer: League: Duckens Nazon (8); All: Duckens Nazon (14)
Home colours	Away colours	Third colours

The 2021–22 season was the 120th season in the existence of US Quevilly-Rouen Métropole and the club's first season back in the second division of French football since 2018. In addition to the domestic league, Quevilly-Rouen participated in this season's edition of the Coupe de France.

== Players ==
=== First-team squad ===
As of 5 February 2022

Note: Flags indicate national team as defined under FIFA eligibility rules; some limited exceptions apply. Players may hold more than one non-FIFA nationality.

No.	Pos.	Nation	Player
1	GK	FRA	Nicolas Lemaître
2	DF	FRA	Alpha Sissoko
3	DF	FRA	Till Cissokho (on loan from Clermont)
4	MF	MLI	Alassane Diaby
5	DF	FRA	Romain Padovani
6	MF	FRA	Kalidou Sidibé (on loan from Toulouse)
7	FW	FRA	Ottman Dadoune
8	FW	SUR	Florian Jozefzoon
9	FW	HAI	Duckens Nazon
10	MF	FRA	Manoubi Haddad
11	FW	FRA	Bridge Ndilu (on loan from Nantes)
12	MF	FRA	Garland Gbelle
13	MF	FRA	Yann Boé-Kane
14	DF	FRA	Nathan Dekoke
15	FW	SEN	Cheikh Sabaly (on loan from Metz)

No.	Pos.	Nation	Player
16	GK	FRA	Romain Lejeune
17	MF	BFA	Gustavo Sangaré
18	DF	SEN	Souleymane Cissé
20	DF	FRA	Nadjib Cissé
22	DF	HAI	Stéphane Lambese
24	FW	SEN	Issa Soumaré (on loan from Beerschot)
25	DF	FRA	Sami Belkorchia
27	DF	FRA	Damon Bansais
28	FW	FRA	Yassine Bahassa
29	FW	FRA	Cyril Zabou
30	GK	FRA	Louis Pelletier
33	MF	FRA	Johan Rotsen
34	DF	FRA	Albin Demouchy
35	DF	FRA	Alexandre Tégar

== Pre-season and friendlies ==
Win Draw Loss Fixtures

3 July 2021 Friendly	Quevilly-Rouen	0–3	Ajaccio	Lisieux, France
18:00 CEST (UTC+2)				Stadium: Stade Lisieux

7 July 2021 Friendly	Quevilly-Rouen	0–1	Le Havre	Saint-Aubin-sur-Scie, France
18:00 CEST (UTC+2)				Stadium: Stade Jean Dasnias

== Competitions ==
=== Overall record ===
Competition	First match	Last match	Starting round	Final position	Record							
Competition	First match	Last match	Starting round	Final position	Pld	W	D	L	GF	GA	GD	Win %
Ligue 2	24 July 2021	14 May 2022	Matchday 1	18th	38	10	10	18	33	50	−17	26.32
Ligue 2 relegation play-offs	24 May 2022	29 May 2022	First leg	Winners	2	2	0	0	5	1	+4	100.00
Coupe de France	13 November 2021	2 January 2022	Seventh round	Round of 32	4	2	1	1	10	5	+5	50.00
Total					44	14	11	19	48	56	−8	31.82

Source: Soccerway

=== Ligue 2 ===
==== League table ====
Pos	Team	Pld	W	D	L	GF	GA	GD	Pts	Promotion or Relegation
16	Valenciennes	38	10	14	14	34	47	−13	44	
17	Rodez	38	10	13	15	32	42	−10	43	
18	Quevilly-Rouen (O)	38	10	10	18	33	50	−17	40	Qualification for the relegation play-offs
19	Dunkerque (R)	38	8	7	23	28	53	−25	31	Relegation to Championnat National
20	Nancy (R)	38	6	9	23	32	69	−37	27	Relegation to Championnat National

Source: Ligue 2
Rules for classification: 1) Points; 2) Goal difference; 3) Number of goals scored; 4) Head-to-head goal difference; 5) Fair play points
(O) Play-off winners; (R) Relegated

==== Results summary ====
Overall								Home						Away					
Pld	W	D	L	GF	GA	GD	Pts	W	D	L	GF	GA	GD	W	D	L	GF	GA	GD
38	10	10	18	33	50	−17	40	5	7	7	18	22	−4	5	3	11	15	28	−13

Source: Ligue 2

==== Results by round ====
Round	1	2	3	4	5	6	7	8	9	10	11	12	13	14	15	16	17	18	19	20	21	22	23	24	25	26	27	28	29	30	31	32	33	34	35	36	37	38
Ground	A	H	A	H	A	H	A	H	A	H	A	H	A	A	H	A	H	A	H	A	H	A	H	A	H	A	H	A	H	A	H	H	A	H	A	H	A	H
Result	D	L	W	W	L	L	W	D	L	D	W	L	D	L	D	L	W	W	D	L	D	L	W	L	D	L	L	D	D	L	L	W	L	L	W	L	L	W
Position	9	13	8	6	11	12	11	11	12	12	8	10	12	15	14	17	13	11	11	12	13	16	12	16	16	17	17	18	18	18	18	16	17	18	17	18	18	18

Source: Ligue 2
A = Away; H = Home; W = Win; D = Draw; L = Loss

==== Matches ====
The league fixtures were announced on 25 June 2021.

24 July 2021 1	Dunkerque	1–1	Quevilly-Rouen	Dunkerque
19:00 CEST (UTC+2)	Sy (yellow card) 5'; Ouadah (yellow card) 19'; Gomis 31'; Dudouit (yellow card) 61'	Report	Haddad 7' (pen.); Bahassa (yellow card) 78'	Stadium: Stade Marcel-Tribut; Referee: Olivier Thual

7 August 2021 3	Amiens	1–3	Quevilly-Rouen	Amiens
19:00 CEST (UTC+2)	Akolo 11'	Report	Nazon 19', 39', 58'; Bansais (yellow card) 36'; Diaby (red card) 50'; Boé-Kane (yellow card) 90+4'	Stadium: Stade de la Licorne; Referee: Marc Bollengier

14 August 2021 4	Quevilly-Rouen	2–1	Dijon	Rouen
19:00 CEST (UTC+2)	Haddad 26'; Sangaré (yellow card) 43'; Gbellé 79'	Report	Deaux (yellow card) 48'; Scheidler 74', (yellow card) 90+3'; Traoré (yellow card) 79'	Stadium: Stade Robert Diochon; Referee: Gaël Angoula

18 August 2021 2	Quevilly-Rouen	1–2	Bastia	Rouen
19:00 CEST (UTC+2)	Nazon (yellow card) 50'; Padovani 77'; Bansais (yellow card) 88'	Report	Diongue 24', (yellow card) 37'; Palun (yellow card) 27'; Schur 60'	Stadium: Stade Robert Diochon; Referee: Pierre Legat

21 August 2021 5	Grenoble	2–0	Quevilly-Rouen	Grenoble
19:00 CEST (UTC+2)	Ravet 31'; Pickel 52'	Report	Nazon (yellow card) 29'	Stadium: Stade des Alpes; Referee: Frank Schneider

28 August 2021 6	Quevilly-Rouen	0–1	Paris FC	Rouen
19:00 CEST (UTC+2)	Cissokho (red card) 30'; Sangaré (yellow card) 66'; Lemaître (yellow card) 68'; Boé-Kane (yellow card) 70'	Report	Alfarela (yellow card) 68'; Guilavogui 77'; Kanté (yellow card) 87'	Stadium: Stade Robert Diochon; Referee: Remi Landry

11 September 2021 7	Valenciennes	1–2	Quevilly-Rouen	Valenciennes
19:00 CEST (UTC+2)	Guillaume 18'; Ouattara (yellow card) 44'; D'Almeida (yellow card) 53'	Report	Diaby (yellow card) 20'; Bansais (yellow card) 23'; Nazon (yellow card) 52'; Haddad (penalty missed) 57; Boé-Kane 57'; Gbellé 83'	Stadium: Stade du Hainaut; Referee: Arnaud Baert

18 September 2021 8	Quevilly-Rouen	0–0	Auxerre	Rouen
19:00 CEST (UTC+2)	Dekoke (yellow card) 62'; Sidibé (yellow card) 90+4'	Report	Hein (yellow card) 57'; Touré (red card) 57'	Stadium: Stade Robert Diochon; Referee: Olivier Thual

21 September 2021 9	Le Havre	1–0	Quevilly-Rouen	Le Havre
20:45 CEST (UTC+2)	P. Bâ 7'; A. Ba (yellow card) 28'	Report	Gbellé (yellow card) 14'; Boé-Kane (yellow card) 55'	Stadium: Stade Océane; Referee: Mathieu Vernice

24 September 2021 10	Quevilly-Rouen	2–2	Guingamp	Rouen
19:00 CEST (UTC+2)	Sidibé 2', (yellow card) 39'; Gbellé 27' (pen.); Jozefzoon (yellow card) 33'; Diaby (yellow card) 84'	Report	Pierrot 13', (yellow card) 13'; Sivis (yellow card) 26'; Muyumba 45'; Phaëton (yellow card) 84'	Stadium: Stade Robert Diochon; Referee: Guillaume Paradis

2 October 2021 11	Ajaccio	0–1	Quevilly-Rouen	Ajaccio
19:00 CEST (UTC+2)	Cimignani (yellow card) 8'; Nouri (yellow card) 84'	Report	Zabou (yellow card) 25'; Sidibé (yellow card) 49'; Diaby 62'; Cissokho (yellow card) 68'; Sangaré (yellow card) 73' (yellow-red card) 83'; Bansais (yellow card) 75'	Stadium: Stade François Coty; Referee: Alexandre Perreau Niel

16 October 2021 12	Quevilly-Rouen	0–3	Niort	Rouen
19:00 CEST (UTC+2)	Bansais (yellow card) 39'	Report	Vallier (yellow card) 7', (goal) 13'; Mendes 23' (pen.); Zemzemi (yellow card) 51'; Kilama (yellow card) 59'; Renel 82'	Stadium: Stade Robert Diochon; Referee: Bartolomeu Varela

23 October 2021 13	Sochaux	1–1	Quevilly-Rouen	Montbéliard
21:00 CEST (UTC+2)	Do Couto 48', (yellow card) 56'; Ambri (yellow card) 52'	Report	Gbellé 3'; Sangaré (yellow card) 40'; Boé-Kane (yellow card) 76'	Stadium: Stade Auguste Bonal; Referee: Jeremy Stinat

30 October 2021 14	Rodez	3–0	Quevilly-Rouen	Rodez
19:00 CET (UTC+1)	Célestine (yellow card) 39'; Dembélé 50', (yellow card) 56'; Boissier 66'; Bonnet (yellow card) 70', (goal) 79'	Report	Nazon (yellow card) 37'; Sidibé (yellow card) 61'	Stadium: Stade Paul-Lignon; Referee: Abdelatifa Kherradji

6 November 2021 15	Quevilly-Rouen	0–0	Toulouse	Rouen
19:00 CET (UTC+1)	Diaby (yellow card) 90'	Report	Spierings (yellow card) 84'	Stadium: Stade Robert Diochon; Referee: Gaël Angoula

20 November 2021 16	Nîmes	2–1	Quevilly-Rouen	Nîmes
19:00 CEST (UTC+2)	Ponceau (yellow card) 13'; Ómarsson 27'; Ueda (yellow card) 52'; Benrahou 54'; Fomba (yellow card) 74'; Paquiez (yellow card) 75'	Report	Nazon 16'; Gbellé (yellow card) 65'	Stadium: Stade des Costières; Referee: Alexandre Perreau Niel

3 December 2021 17	Quevilly-Rouen	2–1	Nancy	Rouen
19:00 CET (UTC+1)	Cissokho 9'; Nazon 66'; Sangaré (yellow card) 76'; Sidibé (yellow card) 82'	Report	Thiam 3'; Delos (yellow card) 28'; El Kaoutari (yellow card) 80' (yellow-red card) 90+4'; Basila (yellow card) 90+1'	Stadium: Stade Robert Diochon; Referee: Bartolomeu Varela

11 December 2021 18	Pau	1–2	Quevilly-Rouen	Pau
19:00 CEST (UTC+2)	Daubin (yellow card) 82'; Keita 87'; Armand (yellow card) 90+10'	Report	Dekoke (yellow card) 46'; Nazon 56'; Ndilu 81'	Stadium: Nouste Camp; Referee: Gaël Angoula

21 December 2021 19	Quevilly-Rouen	2–2	Caen	Rouen
20:45 CET (UTC+1)	Sangaré (yellow card) 40'; Padovani 90+1'; Sidibé 90+2'	Report	Oniangué 25' da Costa 49'; Wadja (yellow card) 90'; Mendy (red card) 90+4'	Stadium: Stade Robert Diochon; Referee: Alexandre Perreau Niel

8 January 2022 20	Bastia	3–0	Quevilly-Rouen	Furiani
19:00 CET (UTC+1)	Santelli 14'; Vincent (yellow card) 17'; Kaïboué 80'; Talal 87'	Report	Gbellé (yellow card) 32'	Stadium: Stade Armand Cesari; Referee: Ruddy Buquet

22 January 2022 22	Dijon	1–0	Quevilly-Rouen	Dijon
19:00 CET (UTC+1)	Scheidler (yellow card) 8', (goal) 49'; Younoussa (yellow card) 17'	Report	Dekoke (yellow card) 60'	Stadium: Stade Gaston Gérard; Referee: Bartolomeu Varela

26 January 2022 21	Quevilly-Rouen	1–1	Amiens	Rouen
19:00 CET (UTC+1)	Diaby (yellow card) 18'; S. Cissé (yellow card) 23'; Lambese (yellow card) 61'; Gbellé 74'	Report	Gnahoré 42'; Badji (yellow card) 67'	Stadium: Stade Robert Diochon; Referee: Abdelatifa Kherradji

5 February 2022 23	Quevilly-Rouen	1–0	Grenoble	Rouen
19:00 CET (UTC+1)	Gbellé (yellow card) 49'; Jozefzoon 72'; Boé-Kane (yellow card) 88'	Report	Monfray (yellow card) 6'; Perez (yellow card) 14'; Tell (yellow card) 43'; Gaspar (yellow card) 82'	Stadium: Stade Robert Diochon; Referee: Arnaud Baert

12 February 2022 24	Paris FC	3–0	Quevilly-Rouen	Paris
19:00 CET (UTC+1)	Gueye 7'; Guilavogui 41' (pen.), (yellow card) 50'; Iglesias (yellow card) 55'; Boutaïb 58' (pen.)	Report		Stadium: Stade Sébastien Charléty; Referee: Benjamin Lepaysant

19 February 2022 25	Quevilly-Rouen	1–1	Valenciennes	Rouen
19:00 CET (UTC+1)	Diaby 40'; Sidibé (yellow card) 54'; Gbellé (yellow card) 76'	Report	Kaba (yellow card) 18'; Debuchy (yellow card) 27'; Bonnet 29'; Yatabaré (yellow card) 70'; Lecoeuche (yellow card) 87'	Stadium: Stade Robert Diochon; Referee: Guillaume Paradis

26 February 2022 26	Auxerre	1–0	Quevilly-Rouen	Auxerre
19:00 CET (UTC+1)	Dugimont 13', (yellow card) 66'	Report	Bahassa (yellow card) 88'	Stadium: Stade de l'Abbé-Deschamps; Referee: Remi Landry

5 March 2022 27	Quevilly-Rouen	0–2	Le Havre	Rouen
19:00 CET (UTC+1)	Boé-Kane (yellow card) 63'; Bansais (yellow card) 90+1'	Report	Abline 16'; Cornette 65'	Stadium: Stade Robert Diochon; Referee: Marc Bollengier

12 March 2022 28	Guingamp	1–1	Quevilly-Rouen	Guingamp
19:00 CET (UTC+1)	Roux 8'; Quemper (yellow card) 78'; M'Changama (yellow card) 78'; Lemonnier (yellow card) 90+3'	Report	Sidibé (yellow card) 21'; Soumaré 28'; Belkorchia (yellow card) 37'; Nazon (yellow card) 81'	Stadium: Stade de Roudourou; Referee: Abdelatif Kherradji

15 March 2022 29	Quevilly-Rouen	0–0	Ajaccio	Le Petit-Quevilly
19:00 CET (UTC+1)	Gbelle (yellow card) 44'	Report	Barreto (yellow card) 64'; Krasso (yellow card) 69'	Stadium: Stade Robert Diochon; Referee: Gaël Angoula

19 March 2022 30	Niort	2–0	Quevilly-Rouen	Niort
20:00 CET (UTC+1)	Sissoko 33', 68'	Report	Bansais (yellow card) 6'; Boé-Kane (yellow card) 22'; Sangaré (red card) 88'	Stadium: Stade René Gaillard; Referee: Benjamin Lepaysant

2 April 2022 31	Quevilly-Rouen	0–2	Sochaux	Le Petit-Quevilly
19:00 CEST (UTC+2)	Bahassa (yellow card) 71'; Sidibé (yellow card) 74'	Report	Mauricio 45+1'; Ambri 65'	Stadium: Stade Robert Diochon; Referee: Pierre Legat

9 April 2022 32	Quevilly-Rouen	2–0	Rodez	Le Petit-Quevilly
19:00 CEST (UTC+2)	Nazon 22', (yellow card) 62'; Gbelle 43'; Soumaré (yellow card) 64'; Boé-Kane (yellow card) 67'	Report	Boissier (yellow card) 45+1'; Obiang (yellow card) 70'; Raux-Yao (yellow card) 81'	Stadium: Stade Robert Diochon; Referee: Benoit Millot

16 April 2022 33	Toulouse	2–0	Quevilly-Rouen	Toulouse
15:00 CEST (UTC+2)	Nicolaisen (yellow card) 70'; Healey 75'; Ratão 90+2'	Report	Boé-Kane (yellow card) 18'; Dekoke (yellow card) 50'	Stadium: Stadium de Toulouse; Referee: Romain Lissorgue

19 April 2022 34	Quevilly-Rouen	0–1	Nîmes	Le Petit-Quevilly
20:00 CEST (UTC+2)	Lejeune (yellow card) 49'; Cissokho (yellow card) 90+1'	Report	Eliasson 9'; Delpech (yellow card) 60'; Fomba (yellow card) 67'; Ueda (yellow card) 81'; Koné (yellow card) 86'	Stadium: Stade Robert Diochon; Referee: Aurélien Petit

22 April 2022 35	Nancy	0–3	Quevilly-Rouen	Tomblaine
21:00 CEST (UTC+2)	Lefebvre (yellow card) 12'	Report	Lambese 13'; Sabaly 18'; Nazon 34'	Stadium: Stade Marcel Picot; Referee: Rémi Landry

30 April 2022 36	Quevilly-Rouen	1–2	Pau	Le Petit-Quevilly
20:00 CEST (UTC+2)	Sidibé 10'; Gbelle (yellow card) 32'	Report	Naidji 72'; Armand 88'	Stadium: Stade Robert Diochon; Referee: Nicolas Rainville

7 May 2022 37	Caen	2–0	Quevilly-Rouen	Caen
19:00 CEST (UTC+2)	Vandermersch (yellow card) 27'; Court (yellow card) 33'; Abdi (yellow card) 49', (goal) 90+2'; Jeannot 77', (yellow card) 78'	Report	Boé-Kane (yellow card) 13'; Sidibé (yellow card) 61'	Stadium: Stade Michel d'Ornano; Referee: Frank Schneider

14 May 2022 38	Quevilly-Rouen	3–1	Dunkerque	Le Petit-Quevilly
19:00 CEST (UTC+2)	Nazon 28'; Sabaly 70'; Jozefzoon 75'; Dekoke (yellow card) 90'	Report	Brahimi 15'; Pierre (yellow card) 81'	Stadium: Stade Robert Diochon; Referee: Olivier Thual

==== Relegation play-offs ====
24 May 2022 First leg	Villefranche	1–3	Quevilly-Rouen	Villefranche-sur-Saône
20:30 CEST (UTC+2)	Elisor 28' (pen.)	Report	Soumaré 30', 73'; Padovani 79'	Stadium: Stade Armand Chouffet; Referee: Abdelatif Kherradji

29 May 2022 Second leg	Quevilly-Rouen	2–0 (5–1 agg.)	Villefranche	Le Petit-Quevilly
16:00 CEST (UTC+2)	Nazon 50', 81'	Report		Stadium: Stade Robert Diochon; Referee: Alexandre Perreau Niel

=== Coupe de France ===
13 November 2021 Seventh round	AS Étaples	1–3	Quevilly-Rouen	Le Touquet
19:00 CET (UTC+1)	Legal 53'	Report	Dadoune 25'; Ndilu 38'; Nazon 67'	Stadium: Stade Gérard Houllier; Referee: Benjamin Lepaysant

27 November 2021 Eighth round	J3S Amilly	0–5	Quevilly-Rouen	Amilly
14:00 CET (UTC+1)		Report	Padovani 19'; Nazon 21', 25'; Sidibé 62'; Ndilu 82'	Stadium: Stade Georges Clériceau; Referee: Azzedine Souifi

18 December 2021 Round of 64	Quevilly-Rouen	1–1 (4–2 p)	Stade Lavallois	Le Petit-Quevilly
18:30 CET (UTC+1)	Nazon 72'	Report	Maggiotti 16'	Stadium: Stade Robert Diochon; Referee: Antony Gautier

2 January 2022 Round of 32	Quevilly-Rouen	1–3	Monaco	Le Petit-Quevilly
18:30 CET (UTC+1)	Sidibé 43', (red card) 90+1'	Report	Matazo (yellow card) 25'; Ben Yedder 33' (pen.); Volland 37', 58'; Henrique (yellow card) 70'	Stadium: Stade Robert Diochon; Referee: Stéphanie Frappart
