= Souleymane =

Souleymane is a West African masculine given name and surname. Notable people with the name include:

== Given name ==
- Souleymane Alio (born 2006), Ivorian footballer
- Souleymane Anne (born 1997), French footballer
- Souleymane Aw (born 1999), Senegalese footballer
- Souleymane Bamba (born 1985), French footballer
- Souleymane Berthé (born 2000), Malian basketball player
- Souleymane Camara (born 1982), Senegalese footballer
- Souleymane Cissé (1940–2025), Malian film director
- Souleymane Cissé (footballer, born 1990) (born 1990), Senegalese footballer
- Souleymane Cissé (footballer, born 1991) (born 1991), Senegalese footballer
- Souleymane Cissé (footballer, born 1999) (born 1999), Senegalese footballer
- Souleymane Cissé (footballer, born 2002) (born 2002), French footballer
- Souleymane Djimou Cissé (born 1999), Senegalese footballer
- Souleymane Cissokho (born 1991), Senegal-born French boxer
- Souleymane Coulibaly (born 1994), Ivorian footballer
- Souleymane Coulibaly (footballer, born 1996) (born 1996), Malian footballer
- Souleymane Demba (born 1991), Zambian-born Malian footballer
- Souleymane Dembélé (born 1984), Malian footballer
- Souleymane Démé (born 1986), Chadian actor
- Souleymane Diabate (born 1991), Malian footballer
- Souleymane Diaby (footballer, born 1987) (born 1987), Ivorian footballer
- Souleymane Diaby (footballer, born 1999) (born 1999), Ivorian footballer
- Souleymane Bachir Diagne (born 1955), Senegalese philosopher
- Souleymane Kelefa Diallo (1959–2013), chief of staff of the Guinean Army
- Souleymane Diallo (boxer) (born 1937), French boxer
- Souleymane Diallo (footballer) (born 1987), Mauritanian footballer
- Souleymane Diallo (journalist) (1945–2026), Guinean journalist
- Souleymane Diamouténé (born 1983), Malian footballer
- Souleymane Diarra (born 1995), Malian footballer
- Souleymane Diawara (born 1978), Senegalese footballer
- Souleymane Diomandé (born 1992), Ivorian footballer
- Souleymane Doucouré, Malian politician
- Souleymane Doukara (born 1991), French footballer
- Souleymane Fall (born 1969), Senegalese footballer
- Souleymane Faye (footballer) (born 2003), Senegalese footballer
- Souleymane Faye (linguist), Senegalese linguist
- Souleymane Guengueng, Chadian torture victim and human rights activist
- Souleymane Karamoko (born 1992), French footballer
- Souleymane Keïta (born 1986), Malian footballer
- Souleymane Keïta (jihadist) (died 2020), Senegalese jihadist
- Souleymane Keita (Senegalese footballer) (born 1986), Senegalese footballer
- Souleymane Koanda (born 1992), Burkinabé footballer
- Souleymane Konaté (born 1989), Malian footballer
- Souleymane Kone (born 1996), Ivorian footballer
- Souleymane Ly (1919–1994), Nigerien educator
- Souleymane Mamam (born 1985), Togolese footballer
- Souleymane M'baye (born 1975), French boxer
- Souleymane Mboup (born 1951), Senegalese microbiologist
- Souleymane Napare (born 2003), Burkinabé swimmer
- Souleymane Ndéné Ndiaye (born 1958), Senegalese politician
- Souleymane Oularé (born 1972), Guinean footballer
- Souleymane Dela Sacko (born 1984), Nigerien footballer
- Souleymane Sané (born 1961), Senegalese footballer
- Souleymane Sangaré (born 1969), Malian footballer
- Souleymane Sawadogo (born 1993), Burkinabé footballer
- Souleymane Sidibé (politician) (1949–2022), Malian diplomat
- Souleymane Lamine Sidibe (born 2007), English footballer
- Souléymane Sy Savané, Ivorian actor
- Souleymane Sylla (actor), Guinean-born Italian actor
- Souleymane Sylla (footballer) (born 1984), Guinean footballer
- Souleymane Tandia (born 1987), Senegalese footballer
- Souleymane Touré (born 1980), Guinean politician
- Souleymane Isaak Touré (born 2003), French footballer
- Souleymane Traore (1987–2009), Guinean footballer
- Souleymane Youla (born 1981), Guinean football player

== Surname ==
- Aïchatou Mindaoudou Souleymane (born 1959), Nigerien diplomat
- Asrangue Souleymane (born 1982), Central African basketball player
- Bi Sidi Souleymane (1962–2021), Central African rebel
- Chérif Souleymane (born 1944), Guinean footballer
- Lassana Cisse Souleymane (died 2019), Ivorian murder victim
- Mahamadou Souleymane (born 1984), Tuareg songwriter
- Nafissa Souleymane (born 1992), Nigerien sprinter
- Zakariya Souleymane (born 1994), French footballer

== See also ==
- Souleymane's Story, a 2024 French film
