= 2025–26 Ratchaburi F.C. season =

Ratchaburi
2025-26 season
- Chairman: (Thailand) Tanawat Nitikarnchana
- Manager: (Thailand) Worrawoot Srimaka
- Stadium: Dragon Solar Park, Mueang Ratchaburi, Ratchaburi, Thailand
- Thai League T1: TBD
- Thai FA Cup: TBD
- Thai League Cup: TBD
Home colours	Away colours	Third colours

The 2025-26 season is Ratchaburi Football Club's 19th existence. It is the 9th season in the Thai League and the club's 13th consecutive season in the top flight of the Thai football league system since promoted in the 2013 season. In this season, Ratchaburi participates in 3 competitions which consisted of the Thai League, FA Cup, League Cup, and 2025–26 AFC Champions League Two.

== Squad ==
As of 15 August 2024

Squad No.	Name	Nationality	Date of Birth (Age)	Previous Club
Goalkeepers
39	Atituch Chankar	(Thailand)	15 February 2005 (age 21)	(Thailand) Mahasarakham
46	Peerapong Watjanapayon	(Thailand)	23 May 2003 (age 23)	(Thailand) Fleet FC
97	Ukrit Wongmeema	(Thailand)	9 July 1991 (age 34)	(Thailand) Kasetsart
99	Kampol Pathomakkakul (Vice-captain)	(Thailand)	27 July 1992 (age 33)	(Thailand) Muangthong United
Defenders
2	Gabriel Mutombo	(France) (Democratic Republic of the Congo)	19 January 1996 (age 30)	(Greece) Chania FC (G2)
3	Sidcley	(Brazil)	13 May 1993 (age 33)	(Greece) Lamia (G1)
4	Jonathan Khemdee	(Thailand) (Denmark)	9 May 2002 (age 24)	(Denmark) OB Odense (D1)
5	Daniel Ting	(Malaysia) (England)	1 December 1992 (age 33)	(Malaysia) Sabah
15	Adisorn Promrak	(Thailand)	21 October 1993 (age 32)	(Thailand) Port
19	Suporn Peenagatapho	(Thailand)	21 July 1995 (age 30)	(Thailand) Buriram United
23	Kevin Deeromram	(Thailand) (Sweden)	11 September 1997 (age 28)	(Malaysia) Selangor
27	Jesse Curran	(Philippines) (Australia)	16 July 1996 (age 29)	(Thailand) BG Pathum United
29	Kiatisak Jiamudom	(Thailand)	19 March 1995 (age 31)	(Thailand) Chainat Hornbill
33	Pethay Promjan	(Thailand)	23 March 2006 (age 20)	(Thailand) Suphanburi
Midfielders
6	Tana	(Spain)	20 September 1990 (age 35)	(Spain) CD Mensajero (S5)
8	Thanawat Suengchitthawon	(Thailand) (France)	8 January 2000 (age 26)	(Thailand) Muangthong United
10	Jakkaphan Kaewprom (captain)	(Thailand)	24 May 1988 (age 38)	(Thailand) Buriram United
14	Roque Mesa (Note: Mesa registered for ACL Elite only)	(Spain)	7 June 1989 (age 37)	(Malaysia) Johor Darul Ta'zim
16	Siwakorn Jakkuprasat (Vice-captain)	(Thailand)	23 April 1992 (age 34)	(Thailand) Port
18	Teeraphol Yoryoei	(Thailand)	25 October 1994 (age 31)	(Thailand) Muangthong United
28	Thossawat Limwannasathian	(Thailand)	17 May 1993 (age 33)	(Thailand) Bangkok United
37	Kritsananon Srisuwan	(Thailand)	11 January 1995 (age 31)	(Thailand) Bangkok
66	Natthawat Prompakdee	(Thailand)	7 June 2005 (age 21)	Youth team
77	Faiq Bolkiah	(Brunei) (United States)	9 May 1998 (age 28)	(Thailand) Chonburi
88	Chotipat Poomkaew	(Thailand)	28 May 1998 (age 28)	(Thailand) Chiangrai United
94	Thiraphat Yuyen	(Thailand)	14 February 2006 (age 20)	Youth Team
Forwards
7	Denílson	(Brazil)	18 July 1995 (age 30)	(Brazil) Guarani FC (B3)
9	Gleyson García	(Brazil)	18 November 1996 (age 29)	(Japan) Oita Trinita (J2)
11	Negueba	(Brazil)	7 April 1992 (age 34)	(Thailand) Lamphun Warriors
24	Jaroensak Wonggorn	(Thailand)	18 May 1997 (age 29)	(Thailand) BG Pathum United
89	Njiva Rakotoharimalala	(Madagascar)	6 August 1992 (age 33)	(Saudi Arabia) Al Jandal (S2)
	Manu Vallejo	(Spain)	14 February 1997 (age 29)	(Spain) Ceuta (S2)
Players loaned out during season
5	Apisit Sorada	(Thailand)	28 February 1997 (age 29)	(Thailand) BG Pathum United
17	Sirawit Kasonsumol (M)	(Thailand)	23 September 2004 (age 21)	Youth team
21	Jirawat Thongsaengphrao	(Thailand)	31 March 1998 (age 28)	(Thailand) Ayutthaya United
23	Pongsathon Sangkasopha	(Thailand)	19 October 2006 (age 19)	(Thailand) Maraleina
Players left during season
7	Ottman Dadoune	(France) (Algeria)	26 July 1994 (age 31)	(France) Bourg-Péronnas (F3)
9	Ikhsan Fandi	(Singapore) (South Africa)	9 April 1999 (age 27)	(Thailand) BG Pathum United
11	Romain Habran	(France)	14 June 1994 (age 31)	(Israel) F.C. Kafr Qasim (I2)
30	Seydine N'Diaye	(France) (Niger)	23 April 1998 (age 28)	(Thailand) BG Pathum United
42	Scott Allardice	(Scotland)	31 March 1998 (age 28)	(Scotland) Ross County
91	Jérémy Corinus	(Martinique) (France)	19 January 1996 (age 30)	(Cyprus) Enosis Neon Paralimni (C1)

== Transfer ==
=== In ===
Pre-Season

Date	Position	Player	Transferred from	Fee
First team
31 May 2025	DF	(Thailand) Thanaset Sujarit	(Thailand) Chonburi	End of loan
1 June 2025	DF	(Thailand) Suporn Peenagatapho	(Thailand) Buriram United	Free (Note: Suporn Peenagatapho returned to Ratchaburi permanently after contract end.)
8 June 2025	FW	(Singapore) (South Africa) Ikhsan Fandi	(Thailand) BG Pathum United	Season loan
15 June 2025	MF	(Thailand) Thossawat Limwannasathian	(Thailand) Bangkok United	Free
15 June 2025	MF	(Thailand) Teeraphol Yoryoei	(Thailand) Muangthong United	Free
1 July 2025	DF	(Thailand) Apisit Sorada	(Thailand) BG Pathum United	Free
2 July 2025	DF	(Brazil) Sidcley	(Greece) Lamia (G3)	Free (Note: Sidcley released before season start)
3 July 2025	DF	(Martinique) (France) Jérémy Corinus	(Cyprus) Enosis (C1)	Free
4 July 2025	FW	(France) (Algeria) Ottman Dadoune	(France) Bourg-Péronnas (F3)	Free
5 July 2025	DF	(Thailand) Pethay Promjan	(Thailand) Suphanburi	Free
5 July 2025	FW	(France) Romain Habran	(Israel) F.C. Kafr Qasim (I2)	Free
8 July 2025	GK	(Thailand) Ukrit Wongmeema	(Thailand) Kasetsart	Free
8 July 2025	GK	(Thailand) Peerapong Watjanapayon	(Thailand) Fleet FC	Free
25 July 2025	FW	(Brazil) Negueba	(Thailand) Lamphun Warriors	Free
27 August 2025	FW	(Brazil) Denílson	(Brazil) Guarani FC (B2)	Free
27 September 2025	MF	(Scotland) Scott Allardice	(Scotland) Ross County (S2)	Free

Mid-Season

Date	Position	Player	Transferred from	Fee
First team
24 December 2025	DF	(Thailand) (Sweden) Kevin Deeromram	(Malaysia) Selangor	Free
31 December 2025	MF	(Thailand) Jaroensak Wonggorn	(Thailand) BG Pathum United	Season loan
3 January 2026	DF	(Malaysia) (England) Daniel Ting	(Malaysia) Johor Darul Ta'zim	Season loan
7 January 2026	FW	(Brazil) Gleyson Oliveira	(Japan) Oita Trinita	Free
12 January 2026	DF	(France) (Niger) Seydine N'Diaye	(Thailand) BG Pathum United	Free
February 2026	MF	(Spain) Roque Mesa	Free Agent	N.A.
February 2026	FW	(Brazil) Rafael Bilu	(Brazil) Juventude	Free

Post-Season

Date	Position	Player	Transferred from	Ref
First team
	DF	(Thailand) Sanchai Nontasila	(Thailand) Ratchaburi	Undisclosed
	MF	(Thailand) Ekanit Panya	(Thailand) Ratchaburi	Undisclosed

=== Out ===
Pre-Season

Date	Position	Player	Transferred To	Fee
First team
31 May 2025	DF	(Thailand) Apisit Sorada	(Thailand) BG Pathum United	End of loan
31 May 2025	DF	(Thailand) Shinnaphat Leeaoh	(Thailand) BG Pathum United	End of loan
31 May 2025	DF	(Thailand) Suporn Peenagatapho	(Thailand) Buriram United	End of loan
1 June 2025	MF	(Japan) Tatsuya Tanaka	(Thailand) Customs United (T3)	Free
1 June 2025	FW	(South Korea) Kim Ji-min	(Thailand) Khon Kaen United (T2)	Free
1 June 2025	FW	(France) Clément Depres	(France) Nîmes Olympique (F4)	Free
1 June 2025	FW	(Guinea) (France) Mohamed Mara	(Thailand) Kanchanaburi Power	Season loan (Note: Mohamed Mara's loan extended for another season)
1 July 2025	GK	(Thailand) Chutideth Maunchaingam	(Thailand) Phichit United	Free
6 July 2025	DF	(Thailand) Jirawat Thongsaengphrao	(Thailand) Chanthaburi FC	Season loan
18 July 2025	FW	(France) Romain Habran	(Thailand) PT Prachuap	Free
19 August 2025	FW	(France) (Algeria) Ottman Dadoune	(France) Paris 13 Atletico (F3)	Free
28 August 2025	GK	(Thailand) Kritsanucha Mueansen	(Thailand) Rajpracha (T2)	Season loan
28 August 2025	MF	(Thailand) Pongsathon Sangkasopha	(Thailand) Khon Kaen United (T2)	Season loan
28 August 2025	MF	(Thailand) Sirawit Kasonsumol	(Thailand) Marines (T3)	Season loan

Mid-Season

Date	Position	Player	Transferred To	Fee
First team
19 December 2025	FW	(Singapore) (South Africa) Ikhsan Fandi	(Thailand) BG Pathum United	Early termination of loan
26 December 2025	DF	(Thailand) Apisit Sorada	(Thailand) PT Prachuap	Season loan
1 January 2026	MF	(Scotland) Scott Allardice	(Cambodia) Visakha FC	Free
January 2026	DF	(Martinique) (France) Jérémy Corinus	(South Korea) Jeonnam Dragons	Free
January 2026	DF	(France) (Niger) Seydine N'Diaye	(Thailand)	Free

== Friendlies ==
=== Pre-Season Friendly ===
Win Draw Loss

9 July 2025 1	Ratchaburi (Thailand)	1–0	(Malaysia) Selangor FC	Ratchaburi
	Tana 17'			Stadium: Ratchaburi Stadium

9 July 2025 1	Ratchaburi (Thailand)	1–0	(Malaysia) Selangor FC	Ratchaburi
	Tana 17'			Stadium: Ratchaburi Stadium

12 July 2025 2	Ratchaburi (Thailand)	3–3	(Thailand) PT Prachuap	Ratchaburi
	Njiva Rakotoharimalala; Romain Habran; Ikhsan Fandi		Nick Taylor; Chaowat Veerachat	Stadium: Ratchaburi Stadium

18 July 2025 3	Ratchaburi (Thailand)	2–1	(Thailand) Kasem Bundit University	Ratchaburi
	Ottman Dadoune; Ikhsan Fandi			Stadium: Ratchaburi Stadium

23 July 2025 4	Ratchaburi (Thailand)	2–2	(Indonesia) Persib Bandung	Ratchaburi
			Beckham Putra (??)	Stadium: Ratchaburi Stadium

=== Mid-Season Friendly ===
Win Draw Loss

5 January 2026 1	Ratchaburi (Thailand)	4–1	Kasetsart FC	Ratchaburi
				Stadium: Ratchaburi Stadium

== Competitions ==
=== Thai League 1 ===
==== Matches ====
Win Draw Loss

15 August 2025 1	Ratchaburi	1–1	Kanchanaburi Power	Ratchaburi
	Gabriel Mutombo 57'; Ottman Dadoune (red card) 44'		Mohamed Mara 18'; Peerapat Notchaiya (yellow card) 30'; Alain Oyarzun (yellow card) 45'; Ewerton (yellow card) 90+5'	Stadium: Ratchaburi Stadium; Attendance: 5,878; Referee: Wiwat Jumpaoon

23 August 2025 2	Chonburi	0–1	Ratchaburi	Chonburi
			Njiva Rakotoharimalala 72'; Jérémy Corinus (yellow card) 48'; Negueba (yellow card) 81'	Stadium: Chonburi Stadium; Attendance: 5,855; Referee: Songkran Bunmeekiart

30 August 2025 3	Nakhon Ratchasima	0–2	Ratchaburi	Nakhon Ratchasima
			Denílson 56'; Thanawat Suengchitthawon 79'; Jérémy Corinus (yellow card) 83'	Stadium: 80th Birthday Stadium; Attendance: 5,832; Referee: Sarayut Jakngoen

13 September 2025 4	Ratchaburi	1–0	Port	Ratchaburi
	Denílson 26'			Stadium: Ratchaburi Stadium; Attendance: 5,842; Referee: Torphong Somsing

21 September 2025 5	Muangthong United	1–3	Ratchaburi	Nonthaburi
	Kakana Khamyok (yellow card) 3'; Sorawit Panthong 78'		Teeraphol Yoryoei 53'; Njiva Rakotoharimalala 74'; Denílson 90+8'; Gabriel Mutombo (yellow card) 13'; Thossawat Limwannasathian (yellow card) 58'; Jérémy Corinus (yellow card) 87'; Jakkaphan Kaewprom (yellow card) 90+3'	Stadium: Thunderdome Stadium; Attendance: 5,173; Referee: Phairot Bunkamnoed

28 September 2025 6	Ratchaburi	0–1	Bangkok United	Ratchaburi
	Gabriel Mutombo Kupa (yellow card) 39'; Jonathan Khemdee (yellow card) 72'		Richairo Živković 19' (yellow card) 47'; Jakkapan Praisuwan (yellow card) 52'; Pokklaw Anan (yellow card) 83'	Stadium: Ratchaburi Stadium; Attendance: 4,159; Referee: Songkran Bunmeekiart

5 October 2025 7	PT Prachuap	1–0	Ratchaburi	Prachuap Khiri Khan
	Bernardo Vilar 84'; Kanarin Thawornsak (yellow card) 22'; Jittiphat Wasungnoen (yellow card) 38'; Jesper Nyholm (yellow card) 75'		Apisit Sorada (yellow card) 58'; Adisorn Promrak (yellow card) 71'	Stadium: Sam Ao Stadium; Attendance: 3,319; Referee: Mongkolchai Pechsri

18 October 2025 8	Ratchaburi	5–0	Lamphun Warriors	Ratchaburi
	Njiva Rakotoharimalala 23'; Denilson 41'; Negueba 53'; Tana 83'; Jakkaphan Kaewprom 90'		Todsapol Lated (yellow card) 22'; Noppol Kerdkaew (yellow card) 45'; Ralph (yellow card) 48'; Suriya Singmui (yellow card) 52'; Teerawut Churok (yellow card) 78'	Stadium: Ratchaburi Stadium; Attendance: 3,747; Referee: Pawara Seejen

26 October 2025 9	Uthai Thani	2–3	Ratchaburi	Uthai Thani
	Thitathorn Aksornsri 20'; Bruno Baio 44'; Martin Angha (yellow card) 22'		Thanawat Suengchitthawon 8'; Sidcley 28'; Njiva Rakotoharimalala 48'; Tana (yellow card) 45+1'	Stadium: Uthai Thani Province Stadium; Attendance: 1,943; Referee: Phairot Bunkamnoed

24 December 2025 10 (Rescheduled)	Ratchaburi	1–2	Chiangrai United	Ratchaburi
	Denilson 30' (pen.) (yellow card) 12'; Kritsanon Srisuwan (yellow card) 39'; Thanawat Suengchitthawon (yellow card) 45+1'; Gabriel Mutombo (yellow card) 57'		Itsuki Enomoto 84'; Carlos Iury 90+5' (pen.); Thanawat Pimyotha (yellow card) 38'	Stadium: Ratchaburi Stadium; Attendance: 3,941; Referee: Songkran Bunmeekiart

Match is postponed due to incremental weather

9 November 2025 11	Ayutthaya United	1–3	Ratchaburi	Ayutthaya
	Caíque Lemes 90+2' (pen.); Yashir Islame (yellow card) 54'; Kitphom Bunsan (yellow card) 84'		Jonathan Khemdee 31'; Njiva Rakotoharimalala 61'; Tana 81'	Stadium: Ayutthaya Province Stadium; Attendance: 3,316; Referee: Anusorn Nookaew

22 November 2025 12	Ratchaburi	0–0	BG Pathum United	Ratchaburi
	Jonathan Khemdee (yellow card) 27'; Thossawat Limwannasathian (yellow card) 88'		Ekanit Panya (yellow card) 45+4'; Nika Sandokhadze (yellow card) 56'; Sanchai Nonthasila (yellow card) 65'	Stadium: Ratchaburi Stadium; Attendance: 6,947; Referee: Panumas Phansamo

30 November 2025 13	Buriram United	2–0	Ratchaburi	Buriram
	Guilherme Bissoli 32'; Goran Čaušić 70' (yellow card) 85'; Sasalak Haiprakhon (yellow card) 45'		Jérémy Corinus (yellow card) 37'; Negueba (yellow card) 45+2'	Stadium: Chang Arena; Attendance: 14,466; Referee: Peerasan Krataithong

5 December 2025 14	Ratchaburi	1–0	Sukhothai	Ratchaburi
	Denilson 45+1' (pen.); Jonathan Khemdee (yellow card) 31'		Thiti Thumporn (yellow card) 66'; Elias (yellow card) 90+6'	Stadium: Ratchaburi Stadium; Attendance: 3,259; Referee: Torphong Somsing

16 December 2025 15	Rayong	2–4	Ratchaburi	Rayong
	Anon Amornlerdsak 63'; Stênio Junior 80' (pen.); Saharat Sontisawat (yellow card) 48'; Peerapat Kaminthong (yellow card) 53'		Denilson 18' (pen.), 45+1'; Njiva Rakotoharimalala 65', 73'; Siwakorn Jakkuprasat (yellow card) 46'	Stadium: Rayong Province Stadium; Attendance: 3,175; Referee: Songkran Bunmeekiart

11 January 2026 16	Ratchaburi	1–0	Chonburi	Ratchaburi
	Jaroensak Wonggorn 51'; Jakkaphan Kaewprom (red card) 45+4'; Gabriel Mutombo (yellow card) 51'		Rachata Moraksa (yellow card) 59'; Yotsakon Burapha (yellow card) 65'; Suksan Bunta (yellow card) 90+2'	Stadium: Ratchaburi Stadium; Attendance: 3,974; Referee: Peerasan Krataithong

18 January 2026 17	Ratchaburi	1–0	Nakhon Ratchasima	Ratchaburi
	Adison Promrak 39' (yellow card) 50'; Kritsanon Srisuwan (yellow card) 63'; Thossawat Limwannasthian (yellow card) 90+2'		Jork Becerra (yellow card) 59'	Stadium: Ratchaburi Stadium; Attendance: 3,974; Referee: Phairot Bunkamnoed

24 January 2026 18 (Rescheduled)	Port	2–1	Ratchaburi	Bangkok
	Kaká Mendes 1'; Brayan Perea 33'; Michael Falkesgaard (yellow card) 21'; Teerasak Poeiphimai (yellow card) 25'		Gleyson Oliveira 52'; Daniel Ting (yellow card) 9'; Kritsanon Srisuwan (yellow card) 35'; Jesse Curran (yellow card) 53'; Siwakorn Jakkuprasat (yellow card) 90+5'	Stadium: PAT Stadium; Attendance: 5,088; Referee: Songkran Bunmeekiart

1 February 2026 19	Ratchaburi	3–2	Muangthong United	Ratchaburi
	Gleyson Oliveira 45+6'; Denílson 53'; Jakkaphan Kaewprom 66' (yellow card) 79'; Negueba (yellow card) 90+3'		Theerapat Nanthakowat 23'; Willian Popp 90'; Wattanakorn Sawatlakhorn (yellow card) 37'; Marko Saric (yellow card) 51'; Kakana Khamyok (yellow card) 71'; Kim Dong-Su (yellow card) 90+6'	Stadium: Ratchaburi Stadium; Attendance: 3,999; Referee: Natee Choosuwan

17 April 2026 20 (Rescheduled)	Bangkok United	1–4	Ratchaburi	Pathum Thani
	Rivaldinho 62'; Muhsen Al-Ghassani (yellow card) 79'		Njiva Rakotoharimalala 3'; Denílson 15'; Tana 90+2', 90+6' (yellow card) 53'; Adisorn Promrak (red card) 45+6'; Negueba (yellow card) 62'	Stadium: True BG Stadium; Attendance: 1,505; Referee: Natee Choosuwan

14 February 2026 21 (Rescheduled)	Ratchaburi	1–1	PT Prachuap	Ratchaburi
	Denílson 56'		Saharat Kanyarot 34' (yellow card) 17'; Prasit Jantum (yellow card) 81'; Kenshiro Daniels (yellow card) 90+1'	Stadium: Ratchaburi Stadium; Attendance: 2,991; Referee: Peerasan Krataithong

11 April 2026 22 (Rescheduled)	Lamphun Warriors	1–2	Ratchaburi	Lamphun
	Akarapong Pumwisat 20'; Charlie Clough (yellow card) 15'; Anan Yodsangwal (yellow card) 90+5'		Denilson 23'; Njiva Rakotoharimalala 90+8' (pen.); Thanawat Suengchitthawon (yellow card) 36'	Stadium: Lamphun Province Stadium; Attendance: 2,426; Referee: Torphong Somsing

28 February 2026 23	Ratchaburi	3–1	Uthai Thani	Ratchaburi
	Denilson 4'; Thanawat Suengchitthawon 31'; Tana 90+7'		Martin Angha 64'; Harhys Stewart (yellow card) 37'; Airfan Doloh (yellow card) 90'	Stadium: Ratchaburi Stadium; Attendance: 3,245; Referee: Phairot Bunkamnoed

29 April 2026 24 (Rescheduled)	Chiangrai United	1–0	Ratchaburi	Chiangrai
	Santipap Yaemsaen 62'; Thawatchai Inprakhon (yellow card) 87'; Victor Cardozo (yellow card) 88'; Hélio Batista (yellow card) 90+1'		Denilson (yellow card) 90+4'	Stadium: Singha Chiangrai Stadium; Attendance: 5,199; Referee: Sivakorn Pu-udom

15 March 2026 25	Ratchaburi	1–2	Ayutthaya United	Ratchaburi
	Denilson 84'; Gabriel Mutombo (red card) 57'		Atsadawut Changthong 36' (yellow card) 45'; Chakkit Laptrakul 55'; Chanon Tamma (yellow card) 38'; Wellington (yellow card) 45+2'; Nattapon Worasut (yellow card) 49'; Natcha Promsomboon (yellow card) 53'; Worawut Namvech (yellow card) 90+3'	Stadium: Ratchaburi Stadium; Attendance: 2,891; Referee: Panumas Phansamo

22 March 2026 26	BG Pathum United	2–2	Ratchaburi	Pathum Thani
	Nika Sandokhadze 42' (yellow card) 90+2'; Tomoyuki Doi 60'; Yoshiaki Takagi (yellow card) 68'; Raniel (yellow card) 75'; Kritsada Kaman (yellow card) 90+1'		Gleyson Oliveira 8'; Denilson 27' (yellow card) 45'; Negueba (yellow card) 71'; Jonathan Khemdee (yellow card) 90+1'	Stadium: True BG Stadium; Attendance: 8,070; Referee: Mongkolchai Pechsri

4 April 2025 27	Ratchaburi	2–2	Buriram United	Ratchaburi
	Gleyson Oliveira 21'; Jesse Curran 88'; Thanawat Suengchitthawon (yellow card) 62'; Denilson (yellow card) 90+4'		Guilherme Bissoli 8'; Narubodin Weerawatnodom 48' (yellow card) 63'; Supachai Chaided (yellow card) 57'	Stadium: Ratchaburi Stadium; Attendance: 8,379; Referee: Panumas Phansamo

24 April 2025 28	Sukhothai	1–2	Ratchaburi	Sukhothai
	Mateusinho 38' (yellow card) 9'; Tassanapong Mhuaddarak (yellow card) 40'; Saringkan Promsupa (yellow card) 45+5'		Njiva Rakotoharimalala 59', 71'; Gabriel Mutombo (yellow card) 41'; Negueba (yellow card) 86'; Sidcley (yellow card) 88'	Stadium: Thalay Luang Stadium; Attendance: 4,367; Referee: Torphong Somsing

3 May 2025 29 (Rescheduled)	Ratchaburi	6–1	Rayong	Ratchaburi
	Chotipat Poomkaew 4'; Tana 10'; Njiva Rakotoharimalala 45', 60', 80', 85'		Keven Alemán 72' (pen.); Weslen Junior (yellow card) 14'	Stadium: Ratchaburi Stadium; Referee: Chaikrit Inboonsong

10 May 2025 30	Kanchanaburi Power	0–1	Ratchaburi	Kanchanaburi
	Prachya Fudsuparp (yellow card) 6'; Anumanthan Kumar (red card) 33'; Aboubakar Kamara (yellow card) 45+2'; Sergio Aguero (yellow card) 90+5'		Teeraphol Yoryoei 90+4'; Negueba (yellow card) 28'; Daniel Ting (yellow card) 63'; Aaron Gurd (yellow card) 88'	Stadium: Kanchanaburi Province Stadium; Referee: Phairot Bunkamnoed

Pos	Team	Pld	W	D	L	GF	GA	GD	Pts	Qualification or relegation
1	Buriram United (C)	30	22	4	4	76	31	+45	70	Qualification to the AFC Champions League Elite League stage and ASEAN Club Championship group stage
2	Port	30	18	6	6	59	23	+36	60	Qualification to the AFC Champions League Elite League stage and ASEAN Club Championship group stage
3	Ratchaburi	30	18	5	7	55	30	+25	59	Qualification to the AFC Champions League Elite League stage and ASEAN Club Championship group stage
4	BG Pathum United	30	14	10	6	45	29	+16	52	Qualification for AFC Champions League Two group stage
5	Bangkok United	30	13	11	6	43	32	+11	50	

Source: Thai League 1 2025–26
Rules for classification: 1) Points; 2) Goal difference; 3) Goals scored.
(C) Champions

=== Thai FA Cup ===
Win Draw Loss

29 October 2025 Rd 2	(T3) Lopburi City	2–3	Ratchaburi	Lopburi
	Noppakhun Yingbamrung 24'; Vorraseth Saichan 72'; Arnont Pumsiri (yellow card) 43'		Ikhsan Fandi 6', 14', 27'; Kritsananon Srisuwan (yellow card) 83'	Stadium: Lopburi Stadium; Attendance: 190; Referee: Samrit Ritkaew

21 December 2025 Rd of 32	(T3) Phitsanulok	1–2	Ratchaburi	Phitsanulok
	Burnel Okana-Stasi 76'; Ratthaphon Hommala (yellow card) 6'; Stasi Okana (yellow card) 52'; Juan Francisco Odorisio (yellow card) 52'; Nuttasit Choosai (yellow card) 82'; Navapan Thianchai (yellow card) 88'		Denilson 90+3'; Thossawat Limwannasthian 90+7'	Stadium: Phitsanulok PAO. Stadium; Attendance: 808; Referee: Sarayut Jakngoen

14 January 2026 Rd of 16	(T2) Sisaket United	1–3	Ratchaburi	Sisaket
	Wongsakorn Saenruecha 77'		Jakkaphan Kaewprom 6'; Jaroensak Wonggorn 27'; Chotipat Poomkaew 73'	Stadium: Sri Nakhon Lamduan Stadium; Attendance: 969; Referee: Kotchapoom Meesridaecha

25 February 2026 Quarter Final	Ayutthaya United	1–0	Ratchaburi	Ayutthaya
	Jesse Curran 34' (o.g.); Yashir Islame (yellow card) 80'		Denilson (yellow card) 38'; Gleyson (yellow card) 80'; Gabriel Mutombo Kupa (yellow card) 85'	Stadium: Ayutthaya Province Stadium; Attendance: 1,892; Referee: Veeraporn Maophaeo

=== Thai League Cup ===
28 December 2025 Rd of 32	(T2) Pattani FC	2–0	Ratchaburi	Pattani
	Chukid Wanpraphao 45+1'; Imron Hayiyusoh 60'; Tinnakorn Asurin (yellow card) 6'		Thiraphon Yoyoei (yellow card) 18'	Stadium: Pattani Province Stadium; Attendance: 12,000; Referee: Chaireag Ngam-som

=== AFC Champions League Two ===
==== Group stage ====
Pos	Team	Pld	W	D	L	GF	GA	GD	Pts	Qualification	GOS	RPM	TND	EAS
1	(Japan) Gamba Osaka	6	6	0	0	16	2	+14	18	Advance to round of 16	—	2–0	3–1	3–1
2	(Thailand) Ratchaburi	6	3	0	3	15	8	+7	9	Advance to round of 16	0–2	—	2–0	5–1
3	(Vietnam) Nam Định	6	3	0	3	14	7	+7	9		0–1	3–1	—	9–0
4	(Hong Kong) Eastern	6	0	0	6	2	30	−28	0		0–5	0–7	0–1	—

Source: ACL2
Rules for classification: Tiebreakers

17 September 2025 1	Nam Dinh (Vietnam)	3–1	(Thailand) Ratchaburi	Ninh Bình, Vietnam
	Caio César 35'; Brenner 52', 57'; Trần Văn Công (yellow card) 70'	Report	Tana 60'	Stadium: Thiên Trường Stadium; Attendance: 8,618; Referee: Kim Yu-jeong (South Korea)

2 October 2025 2	Ratchaburi (Thailand)	0–2	(Japan) Gamba Osaka	Ratchaburi, Thailand
	Kritsananon Srisuwan (yellow card) 87'	Report	Shuto Abe 64'; Ryotaro Meshino 90+4'	Stadium: Dragon Solar Park; Referee: Yahya Almulla (United Arab Emirates)

22 October 2025 3	Ratchaburi (Thailand)	5–1	(Hong Kong) Eastern	Ratchaburi, Thailand
	Tana 2'; Denílson 39', 49', 56'; Ikhsan Fandi 89'; Thossawat Limwannasathian (yellow card) 79'; Suporn Peenagatapho (yellow card) 87'	Report	Yu Okubo 74' (yellow card) 59'; Daniel Almazan (yellow card) 21'; Lau Kwan Ching (yellow card) 81'; Ming-Ho Gao (yellow card) 90+1'	Stadium: Dragon Solar Park; Referee: Baraa Aisha (Palestine)

5 November 2025 4	Eastern (Hong Kong)	0–7	(Thailand) Ratchaburi	Mong Kok, Hong Kong
	Lam Hin Ting (yellow card) 32'; Marcos Gondra (yellow card) 49'; Koo Ja-Ryoung (yellow card) 90+2'	Report	Scott Allardice 52'; Tana 56', 72'; Denílson 65', 83'; Ikhsan Fandi 89', 90+5'; Negueba (yellow card) 29'; Sidcley (yellow card) 37'; Daniel Almazan (yellow card) 79'	Stadium: Mong Kok Stadium; Referee: Venkatesh Ramachandran (India)

27 November 2025 5	Ratchaburi (Thailand)	2–0	(Vietnam) Nam Dinah	Ratchaburi, Thailand
	Sidcley 90+2'; Ikhsan Fandi 90+5' (yellow card) 90+5'; Thanawat Suengchitthawon (yellow card) 26'; Denilson (yellow card) 90+6'	Report	Caio César (yellow card) 17'; Rômulo da Silva (yellow card) 45'; Walber (yellow card) 52'; Kevin Pham Ba (yellow card) 89'	Stadium: Dragon Solar Park; Referee: Nasrullo Kabirov (Tajikistan)

11 December 2025 6	Gamba Osaka (Japan)	2–0	(Thailand) Ratchaburi	Osaka, Japan
	Gaku Nawata 53'; Ryoya Yamashita 79'; Daichi Hayashi (yellow card) 90+4'	Report	Sidcley (yellow card) 60'	Stadium: Suita City Football Stadium; Referee: Dong Fangyu (China)

==== Knockout stage ====
11 February 2025 Rd of 16 Leg 1	Ratchaburi (Thailand)	3–0	(Indonesia) Persib	Ratchaburi, Thailand
	Tana 5', 84'; Gabriel Mutombo 53' (yellow card) 89'	Report	Eliano Reijnders (yellow card) 7'	Stadium: Dragon Solar Park; Attendance: 5,844; Referee: Ahmed Eisa Darwish (United Arab Emirates)

18 February 2025 Rd of 16 Leg 2	Persib (Indonesia)	1–0 (1–3 agg.)	(Thailand) Ratchaburi	Bandung, Indonesia
	Andrew Jung 42' (yellow card) 61'; Adam Alis (yellow card) 33'; Uilliam Barros (red card) 46'; Thom Haye (yellow card) 78'	Report	Gleyson (yellow card) 35'	Stadium: Gelora Bandung Lautan Api Stadium; Attendance: 26,406; Referee: Majed Al-Shamrani (Saudi Arabia)

4 March 2026 Quarter Final Leg 1	Gamba Osaka (Japan)	1–1	(Thailand) Ratchaburi	Osaka, Japan
	Gaku Nawata 84'; Takeru Kishimoto (yellow card) 78'	Report	Daniel Ting 18'; Thossawat Limwanasathian (yellow card) 36'	Stadium: Suita City Football Stadium; Attendance: 7,024; Referee: Alex King (Australia)

11 March 2026 Quarter Final Leg 2	Ratchaburi (Thailand)	1–2 (a.e.t.) (2–3 agg.)	(Japan) Gamba Osaka	Ratchaburi, Thailand
	Gleyson 50'; Denison (penalty missed) 67; Roque Mesa (yellow card) 90+3'	Report	Genta Miura 28'; Welton Felipe 99'; Riku Handa (yellow card) 64'; Ryo Hatsuse (yellow card) 77'; Shuto Abe (yellow card) 94'; Issam Jebali (yellow card) 116'	Stadium: Dragon Solar Park; Attendance: 9,862; Referee: Ko Hyung-jin (South Korea)

== Team statistics ==
=== Appearances and goals ===
As of 10 May 26

No.	Pos.	Player	League		FA Cup		League Cup		AFC Champions League Two		Total	
No.	Pos.	Player	Apps.	Goals	Apps.	Goals	Apps.	Goals	Apps.	Goals	Apps.	Goals
2	DF	(France) (Democratic Republic of the Congo) Gabriel Mutombo	24	1	1	0	0	0	8+1	1	34	2
3	DF	(Brazil) Sidcley	14+3	1	0	0	0	0	6	1	23	2
4	DF	(Thailand) (Denmark) Jonathan Khemdee	15+2	1	0+2	0	0	0	6+1	0	26	1
5	DF	(Malaysia) (England) Daniel Ting	15	0	2	0	0	0	4	1	21	1
6	FW	(Spain) Tana	26+3	6	1	0	0	0	9	6	39	12
7	FW	(Brazil) Denílson	22+4	15	1+1	1	0	0	9+1	5	38	21
8	MF	(Thailand) (France) Thanawat Suengchitthawon	23	3	1+1	0	0	0	7+1	0	33	3
9	FW	(Brazil) Gleyson Oliveira	9+1	4	1+1	0	0	0	4	1	16	5
10	MF	(Thailand) Jakkaphan Kaewprom	17+8	2	1+3	1	0	0	3+4	0	36	3
11	FW	(Brazil) Negueba	20+9	1	0	0	0+1	0	10	0	40	1
14	MF	(Spain) Roque Mesa	0	0	0	0	0	0	0+2	0	2	0
15	DF	(Thailand) Adisorn Promrak	7+8	1	3	0	1	0	1+4	0	24	1
16	MF	(Thailand) Siwakorn Jakkuprasat	3+8	0	3	0	1	0	1+2	0	18	0
18	MF	(Thailand) Teeraphol Yoryoei	1+7	1	2+1	0	1	0	0+1	0	13	1
19	DF	(Thailand) Suporn Peenagatapho	3+10	0	3+1	0	1	0	0+6	0	24	0
23	MF	(Thailand) (Sweden) Kevin Deeromram	5+6	0	2	0	0	0	0+1	0	14	0
24	FW	(Thailand) Jaroensak Wonggorn	2+6	1	2	1	0	0	0+1	0	11	2
27	DF	(Philippines) (Australia) Jesse Curran	27+1	1	1+1	0	0	0	10	0	40	1
28	MF	(Thailand) Thossawat Limwannasathian	13+13	0	1+2	1	1	0	7+2	0	39	1
29	DF	(Thailand) Kiatisak Jiamudom	2+2	0	2+1	0	1	0	0	0	8	0
33	DF	(Thailand) Pethay Promjan	0	0	1	0	0+1	0	0	0	2	0
37	MF	(Thailand) Kritsananon Srisuwan	17+7	0	3	0	0+1	0	2+4	0	36	0
46	GK	(Thailand) Peerapong Watjanapayon	0	0	1	0	0	0	0	0	1	0
66	MF	(Thailand) Natthawat Prompakdee	0	0	0	0	0	0	0	0	0	0
77	MF	(Brunei) (United States) Faiq Bolkiah	0+2	0	1	0	0	0	0	0	3	0
88	MF	(Thailand) Chotipat Poomkaew	3+13	1	1+2	1	1	0	0+4	0	24	2
89	FW	(Madagascar) Njiva Rakotoharimalala	20+6	14	3+1	0	1	0	5+3	0	39	14
91	DF	(Martinique) (France) Jérémy Corinus	5+4	0	1	0	1	0	3+1	0	15	0
94	FW	(Thailand) Thiraphat Yuyen	0	0	0	0	0	0	0	0	0	0
97	GK	(Thailand) Ukrit Wongmeema	1+1	0	2	0	1	0	0	0	5	0
99	GK	(Thailand) Kampol Pathomakkakul	29	0	1+1	0	0	0	10	0	41	0
Players loaned out during season
5	DF	(Thailand) Apisit Sorada	4+4	0	1	0	0	0	0+2	0	11	0
11	FW	(Guinea) Mohamed Mara	0	0	0	0	0	0	0	0	0	0
17	MF	(Thailand) Sirawit Kasonsumol	0	0	0	0	0	0	0	0	0	0
23	MF	(Thailand) Pongsathon Sangkasopha	0	0	0	0	0	0	0	0	0	0
Players loaned out / left during season
7	FW	(France) Ottman Dadoune	1	0	0	0	0	0	0	0	1	0
9	FW	(Singapore) (South Africa) Ikhsan Fandi	3+2	0	1	3	0	0	1+5	4	12	7
18	GK	(Thailand) Rattanai Songsangchan	0	0	0	0	0	0	0	0	0	0
11	FW	(France) Romain Habran	0	0	0	0	0	0	0	0	0	0
30	DF	(France) (Niger) Seydine N'Diaye	0	0	0+1	0	0	0	0	0	1	0
42	MF	(Scotland) Scott Allardice	0	0	0	0	0	0	4	1	4	1
