= Souleymane Cissé =

Souleymane Cissé may refer to:

- Souleymane Cissé (film director) (1940–2025), Malian film director
- Souleymane Cissé (footballer, born 1990), Senegalese international football midfielder for Louhans-Cuiseaux
- Souleymane Cissé (footballer, born 1991), Senegalese football midfielder for Hajer
- Souleymane Cissé (footballer, born 1999), Senegalese football defender for Polonia Warsaw
- Souleymane Cissé (footballer, born 2002), French football centre-back for Clermont
