= Williams Sassine =

Guinean writer (1944–1997)

Williams Sassine (1944 in Kankan, Guinea – February 9, 1997 in Conakry, Guinea) was a Guinean novelist who wrote in French.

== Life ==
His father was Lebanese Christian and his mother was a Guinean of Muslim heritage.

Sassine was an expatriate African writer in France after leaving Guinea when it received independence under Sékou Touré. As a novelist he wrote of marginalized characters, but he became more optimistic on Touré's death. His 1979 novel Le jeune homme de sable has been regarded as among the best 20th-century African novels. Few of his works have been translated into English, but Wirriyamu was published in an English translation in 1980.

As an editor he remained critical of Touré as chief editor for the satirical paper Le Lynx. Some of Sassine's works have been translated into English, Spanish and Russian.

== Selected works ==
- Saint Monsieur Baly (1971)
- Wirriyamu (1976) (in 1980, an English language translation by Clive Wake and John Reed was published)
- Le jeune homme de sable (1979)
- L'Alphabête (1982)
- Le Zéhéros n'est pas n'importe qui (1985)
- L'Afrique en Morceaux (1994)
- Mémoire d'une peau (1998)

== Critical studies of Sassine's fictional work ==
- Asaah, Augustine, "L'inscription du corps dans quatre romans postcoloniaux d'Afrique". Présence Francophone 66 (2006), 57–80.
- Baker, Charlotte, Enduring Negativity: Representations of Albinism in the novels of Didier Destremau, Patrick Grainville and Williams Sassine (Peter Lang, 2011).
- Baker, Charlotte, Saint Monsieur Baly. Glasgow Introductory Guides to French Literature 56 (Glasgow French and German Publications, 2010).
- Baker, Charlotte, "'My Sole Reality, My Only Refuge, My Unique Prison': The Body of the Black African Albino in Williams Sassine's Mémoire d'une peau" in Lili Hernandez and Sabine Krajewski (eds), Crossing Cultural Boundaries (Newcastle: Cambridge Scholars Publishing, 2009).
- Chevrier, Jacques, Williams Sassine: écrivain de la marginalité (Toronto: Editions du Gref, 1995).
- Chevrier, Jacques, "Malades et infirmes dans l'œuvre romanesque de Williams Sassine" in Jacqueline Bardolph (ed.), Littérature et maladie dans la littérature africaine (Paris: L'Harmattan, 1994), pp. 173–187.
- Chevrier, Jacques, "La Marginalité, figure du postcolonialisme dans l'œuvre romanesque de Williams Sassine" in Jean Bessière and Jean-Marc Moura (eds), Littératures postcoloniales et francophonie (Paris: Champion, 1999), 131–139.
- Chevrier, Jacques, "De la solitude à la solidarité dans l'œuvre romanesque de Williams Sassine", Notre Librairie, 128 (1996), 126–132.
- Chevrier, Jacques, "Le Thème de l'exclusion et de la marginalité dans l'œuvre de Williams Sassine" in Régis Antoine (ed.), Carrefour de cultures (Tübingen, 1993), 431–438.
- Chevrier, Jacques, "Williams Sassine: Des mathématiques à la littérature", Notre Librairie, 88–89 (1987), 110–118.
- Chevrier, Jacques and Richard Bjornson (1992), "Williams Sassine", Research in African Literatures, 23.4, pp. 133–136.
- Coussy, Denise, and Jacques Chevrier, "L'Errance chez Williams Sassine et V.S. Naipaul", Notre Librairie, 155–156 (2004), 68–75.
- De Saivre, Denise "Humour et communication: L'exemple de Williams Sassine". Présence Africaine 147 (1988), 68–79.
- Giguet, Frédéric, "La construction tragique de l'identité dans l'œuvre romanesque de Williams Sassine" in Dominique Laporte (ed.), L'autre en mémoire, Presses Université Laval, 2006. Unpaginated.
- Lebon, Cécile, "Williams Sassine Mémoire d'une peau: Review". Notre Librairie 136 (1998).
- Ngandu Nkashama, Pius, Ecrire à l'infinitif : la déraison de l'écriture dans les romans de Williams Sassine (Paris: Harmattan, 2006).
- Ngandu Nkashama, Pius, "Il était une fois, Saint Monsieur Baly...". Présence Africaine 155 (1997).
- Sow, Alioune, "Forbidden Bodies: Relocation and Empowerment in Williams Sassine's novels", Matatu: Journal for African Culture and Society, 29 (2005), 207–220.
- Wendeler, Catherine, "The embodiment of wrath in two postcolonial prophecies: La vie et demie by Sony Labou Tansi and Mémoire d'une peau by Williams Sassine", Imperium 2 (2001). Unpaginated.
