= Souleymane Sylla =

Souleymane Sylla may refer to:

- Souleymane Sylla (footballer)
- Souleymane Sylla (actor)
