= Houseboy (novel) =

1956 novel by Ferdinand Oyono

- 1966 English language edition
- Author: Ferdinand Oyono
- Original title: Une vie de boy
- Language: French
- Published: 1956
- Publication place: Cameroon

Houseboy is a novel in the form of a diary written by Ferdinand Oyono, first published in 1956 in French as Une vie de boy (Paris: René Julliard) and translated into English in 1966 by John Reed for Heinemann's African Writers Series.

== Plot summary ==
The novel starts in Spanish Guinea with a Frenchman on vacation, who finds a man named Toundi, who has been injured and soon dies. The Frenchman finds his diary, which is called an "exercise book" by Toundi. The rest of the story consists of the diary (exercise book) that the Frenchman is supposedly reading. There is no further discussion of the Frenchman after this point.

The first "exercise book" starts with Toundi living with his family. His father beats him constantly, and one day Toundi runs away from home to the rescue of Father Gilbert, a priest who lives nearby. His father comes back for him, telling Toundi that everything will be all right if he comes back. He rejects his father's offer and after this point no longer acknowledges his birth parents.

Toundi treats Father Gilbert as his new father. Father Gilbert teaches Toundi to read and write, gives him a name "Joseph" and teaches him more about Catholicism. Toundi believes in Catholicism, but as the story progresses he drifts from his beliefs until the end, when he does not believe in God.

Father Gilbert dies in a motorcycle accident a few months after meeting Toundi. Toundi is eventually taken to live with the Commandant, the man in charge of the surrounding colony. Toundi serves as houseboy for the Commandant. It becomes very clear that the events that go on in the house are more important to Toundi than his own life.

About six months after Toundi comes to live with the Commandant, Madame, the Commandant's wife, arrives from France. She initially is a warm and caring woman, who is very beautiful. She catches the eye of almost every man in town, much to the Commandant's dismay.

Soon after Madame arrives the Commandant leaves to go on tour again. Toundi is left with Madame to take care of the house. As time goes on, Madame becomes more and more hostile and disrespectful towards Toundi. When the Commandant returns, she is portrayed as a ruthless woman. While the Commandant was still on tour, it becomes obvious that she is bored with her life. She begins an affair with M. Moreau, the man in charge of the prison. M. Moreau is perceived to be ruthless against the Africans. One of Toundi's first experiences with M. Moreau was him whipping two other Africans nearly to death.

The Second Exercise book

The Commandant returns from touring, and it is later discovered that he knew about his wife's affair and returns because of it. The Commandant has a terrible argument with her, but after a few days they are getting along again.

Madame becomes very disrespectful towards Toundi, partly because she does not like being there any more, but mostly because she knows that he knew about her affair. Sophie, the lover of the agricultural engineer, is accused of stealing his workers' salaries with the help of Toundi. He is taken to prison, where he is tortured into confessing to a crime he has not committed.

Toundi is held in a hut near the police headquarters. Fortunately he has a friend who works there named Mendim, who is described as a very muscular man. He is feared by most other people but he soon comes to be known as Toundi's ally. M. Moreau orders Mendim to beat up Toundi, but Mendim throws ox's blood on him to make it look like he is injured. They spend the rest of the day playing cards.

Toundi becomes sick and Mendim takes him to the hospital. They have to wait a very long time to see a doctor because the black doctor is the only doctor there, the other white doctor having been promoted to captain. The doctor finds out that Toundi's ribs are broken and have punctured his bronchi.

While Toundi is still at the hospital, in a dazed state, M. Moreau returns with the white doctor and talks about punishing Toundi some more. After M. Moreau has left, Toundi escapes the hospital and heads to Spanish Guinea, where he was first introduced in the beginning of the novel.
