= John O. Reed =

Translator and anthologist (1929–2012)

John O. Reed (1929, London – 2012, Manchester) was an anthologist and translator of African literature.

With Clive Wake he published several anthologies, as well as translations from French of the work of Léopold Sédar Senghor and Jean-Joseph Rabearivelo, in Heinemann's African Writers Series. He also translated work by Ferdinand Oyono. Together, they also translated some of the poetry of Yves Bonnefoy in 1967, but these translations were never published. Posthumously, Wake published their introductory essay to these translations online in tribute.

John Reed made a journal entry every day of his life in his diaries (now held at Chetham’s Library, Manchester) from the age of ten until his death in 2012. For the first years of his life, they offer an insight into the life of a schoolboy during World War Two. After school, Reed recorded the daily details of his National Service. On his discharge, he studied English at Oxford under C. S. Lewis. However, it is his life as a university lecturer in Zimbabwe (formerly Rhodesia) that is perhaps of greatest interest. In 1957 he travelled to Salisbury to take up a teaching post, soon becoming involved in the anti-colonial political struggle, and developing a close friendship with Terence Ranger. The diaries offer a unique insight into the daily lives of those involved in the Liberation movement, and reveal how he was drawn deeper and deeper into what would become a very dark and dangerous situation. He was later forced to leave Rhodesia or face arrest, and took up a professorship at the University of Zambia at Lusaka. There he worked to develop theatre which drew on indigenous traditions and promoted the growth of a new generation of African dramatists.

He also taught at universities in China and Japan and upon retirement lived in Manchester, England.

== Works ==
- (with Clive Wake) A bibliography of modern creative writing in French from Madagascar, Salisbury, 1963
- (ed. with Clive Wake) A Book of African Verse, London: Heinemann Educational, 1964. African Writers Series 8. Later edition published (1984) as A new book of African verse.
- (tr. with Clive Wake) Prose and poetry, by Léopold Sédar Senghor. London: Oxford University Press, 1965.
- (tr.) Houseboy by Ferdinand Oyono. London: Heinemann, 1966. African Writers Series 29.
- (tr.) The Old Man and the Medal, by Ferdinand Oyono. London: Heinemann, 1967. African Writers Series 39.
- (tr. with Clive Wake) Nocturnes, by Léopold Sédar Senghor. London: Heinemann Educational, 1969. African Writers Series 71
- (ed. and tr. with Clive Wake) French African Verse, London, etc.: Heinemann Educational, 1972. African Writers Series 106.
- (tr. with Clive Wake) Translations from the night : Selected poems of Jean-Joseph Rabearivelo. London: Heinemann, 1975. African Writers Series 167
- (tr. with Clive Wake) Wirriyamu by Williams Sassine. London [etc.]: Heinemann, 1980. African Writers Series 199
- (with Michael Etherton) Chikwakwa Remembered: Theatre and Politics in Zambia, 1968-1972, 2011
