= Le Lynx =

Le Lynx is a weekly satirical newspaper published in Guinea. The founding director of the newspaper was Souleymane Diallo. Le Lynx is modelled after the French satirical publication Le Canard enchaîné. Williams Sassine worked as editor of Le Lynx.
