= Cheikh Sabaly =

Senegalese footballer (born 1999)

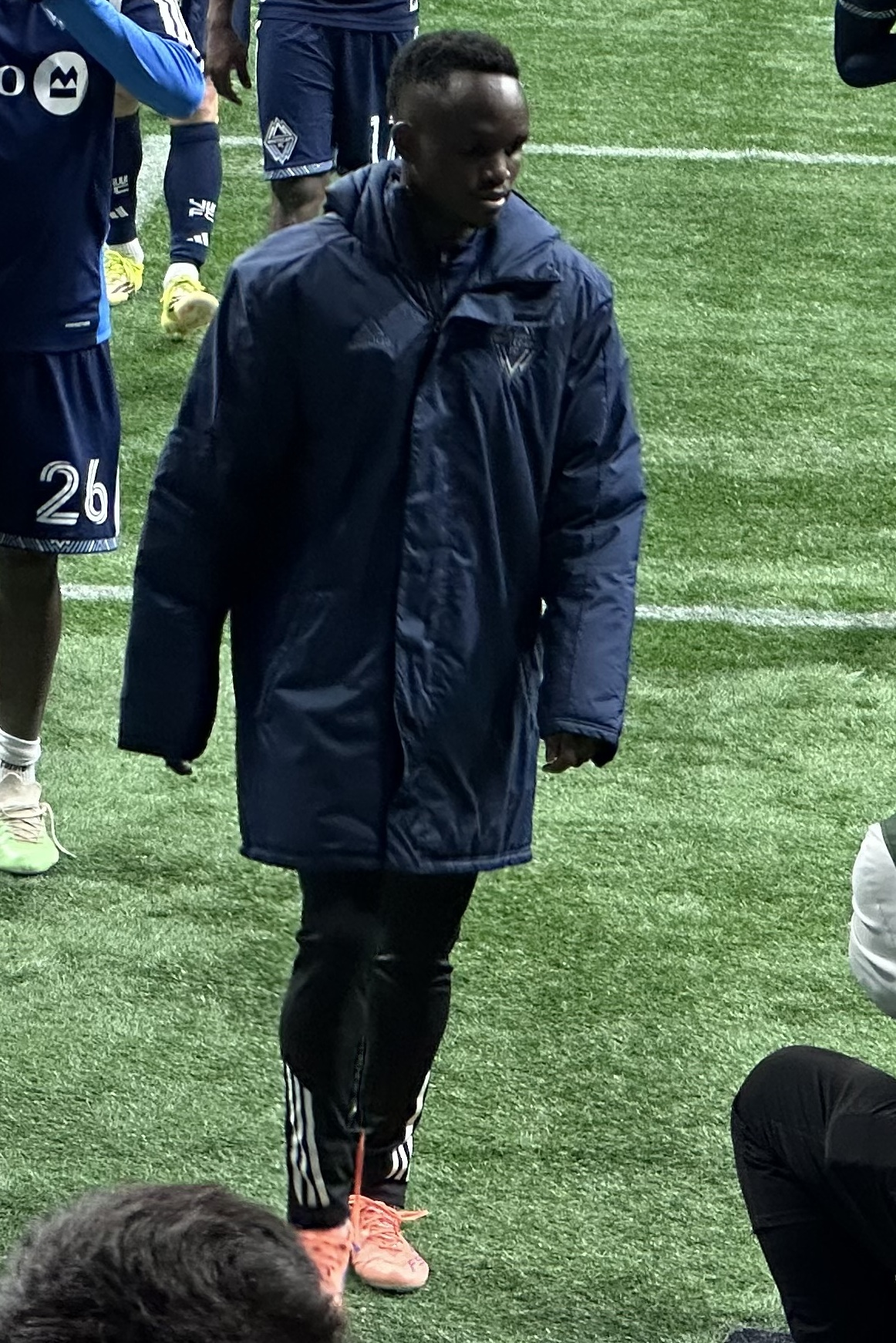
- Sabaly in 2026

Personal information
- Full name: Cheikh Tidiane Sabaly
- Date of birth: 4 March 1999 (age 27)
- Place of birth: Kolda, Senegal
- Height: 1.68 m (5 ft 6 in)
- Position: Right winger

Team information
- Current team: Vancouver Whitecaps
- Number: 7

Youth career
- –2017: Génération Foot

Senior career*
Years	Team	Apps	(Gls)
2017–2018	Génération Foot	0	(0)
2018–2026	Metz	111	(21)
2019–2020	→ Pau (loan)	25	(10)
2020–2022	Metz B	9	(5)
2020–2021	→ Pau (loan)	30	(3)
2021–2022	→ Quevilly-Rouen (loan)	16	(2)
2026–	Vancouver Whitecaps	24	(3)

International career^{‡}
2023–	Senegal	12	(1)
Medal record
Men's football
Representing Senegal
Africa Cup of Nations
Runner-up	2025 Morocco
- * Club domestic league appearances and goals as of 03:32, 8 November 2026 (UTC) ‡ National team caps and goals as of 09:23, 6 February 2026 (UTC)

Cheikh Tidiane Sabaly (born 4 March 1999) is a Senegalese professional footballer who plays as a right winger for Major League Soccer club Vancouver Whitecaps and the Senegal national team.

== Club career ==
Sabaly made his Ligue 1 debut for Metz on 30 August 2020 in a 1–0 home defeat against Monaco.

On 24 January 2022, Sabaly joined Quevilly-Rouen on loan until the end of the season.

On 5 February 2026, Sabaly joined Major League Soccer club Vancouver Whitecaps on a contract through the 2028–29 season, with a club option for 2029–30.

== International career ==
Sabaly made his debut for Senegal during a 1–1 win against Rwanda on 9 August 2023 during 2023 Africa Cup of Nations qualification. He scored his first goal for Senegal during a 3–1 win against England on 10 June 2025.

== Career statistics ==
=== Club ===
As of match played 7 November 2026

Appearances and goals by club, season and competition
Club	Season	League			National cup		Continental		Other		Total	
Club	Season	Division	Apps	Goals	Apps	Goals	Apps	Goals	Apps	Goals	Apps	Goals
Génération Foot	2017–18	Senegalese Ligue 1	0	0	0	0	4 (Note: Two appearances in CAF Champions League, two appearances in CAF Confederation Cup)	0	—		4	0
Metz	2018–19	Ligue 2	0	0	1	0	—		—		1	0
Metz	2020–21	Ligue 1	1	0	0	0	—		—		1	0
Metz	2021–22	Ligue 1	6	0	1	0	—		—		7	0
Metz	2022–23	Ligue 2	28	3	3	0	—		—		31	3
Metz	2023–24	Ligue 1	29	3	1	0	—		1 (Note: Appearance(s) in Ligue 1 relegation/promotion play-offs)	0	31	3
Metz	2024–25	Ligue 2	33	15	1	0	—		3	0	37	15
Metz	2025–26	Ligue 1	14	0	0	0	—		0	0	14	0
Metz	Total		111	21	7	0	0	0	4	0	122	21
Metz B	2020–21	Championnat National 2	2	3	—		—		—		2	3
Metz B	2021–22	Championnat National 2	6	1	—		—		—		6	1
Metz B	2022–23	Championnat National 2	1	1	—		—		—		1	1
Metz B	Total		9	5	0	0	0	0	0	0	9	5
Pau (loan)	2019–20	Championnat National	25	10	5	2	—		—		30	12
Pau (loan)	2020–21	Ligue 2	30	3	0	0	—		—		30	3
Quevilly-Rouen (loan)	2021–22	Ligue 2	16	2	0	0	—		2 (Note: Appearances in Ligue 2 relegation play-offs)	0	18	2
Vancouver Whitecaps	2026	Major League Soccer	24	3	1	0	1 (Note: Appearance in CONCACAF Champions Cup)	0	3 (Note: Appearances in Leagues Cup)	0	29	3
Total			215	44	13	2	5	0	9	0	242	46

=== International ===
As of match played 27 December 2025

Appearances and goals by national team and year
National team	Year	Apps	Goals
Senegal	2023	1	0
Senegal	2024	1	0
Senegal	2025	10	1
Total		12	1

Scores and results list Senegal's goal tally first.

List of international goals scored by Cheikh Sabaly
No.	Date	Venue	Cap	Opponent	Score	Result	Competition
1	10 June 2025	City Ground, Nottingham, England	4	England	3–1	3–1	Friendly
