= Florian Jozefzoon =

Surinamese footballer (born 1991)

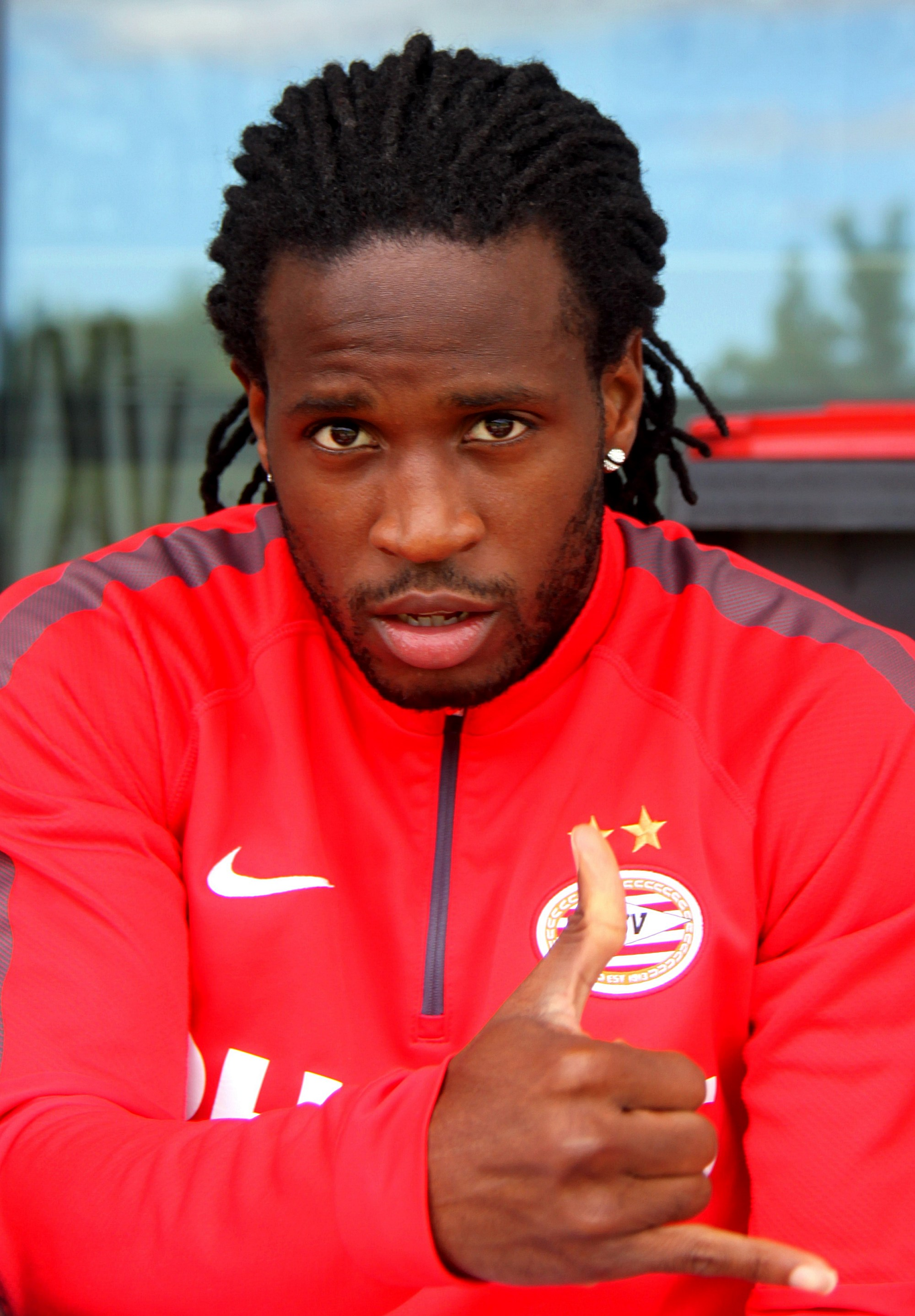
- Jozefzoon with PSV in 2014

Personal information
- Full name: Florian Marc Jozefzoon
- Date of birth: 9 February 1991 (age 35)
- Place of birth: Saint-Laurent-du-Maroni, French Guiana
- Height: 1.73 m (5 ft 8 in)
- Position: Winger

Youth career
- CTO '70
- –2006: AFC
- 2006–2010: Ajax

Senior career*
Years	Team	Apps	(Gls)
2010–2012	Ajax	4	(0)
2011–2012	→ NAC Breda (loan)	16	(0)
2012–2013	RKC Waalwijk	34	(7)
2013–2017	PSV	45	(5)
2013–2017	Jong PSV	17	(4)
2017–2018	Brentford	58	(8)
2018–2021	Derby County	41	(2)
2020–2021	→ Rotherham United (loan)	24	(0)
2021–2022	Quevilly-Rouen	24	(2)
2022–2023	RKC Waalwijk	26	(5)
2023–2024	Bandırmaspor	29	(4)
2025	Intercity	1	(0)
Total		319	(37)

International career
2009–2010	Netherlands U19	5	(0)
2010–2013	Netherlands U21	5	(0)
2021–2023	Suriname	18	(1)
- * Club domestic league appearances and goals

Florian Marc Jozefzoon (born 9 February 1991) is a former professional footballer who played as a winger. Born in French Guiana, he represented the Suriname national team.

He is a product of the Ajax Youth Academy and won ten caps for the Netherlands at youth level. He has also won the Eredivisie with PSV Eindhoven in 2014–15 and 2015–16. Whist in the Netherlands he had a loan spell at NAC Breda, from Ajax and also played for RKC Waalwijk in between his spells at Ajax and PSV.

In 2017, Jozefzoon moved to England where he played in the Championship for Brentford and Derby County, as well as having a loan spell at Rotherham United. He ended his career across Europe with short spells at Quevilly-Rouen in France, rejoining RKC Waalwijk in the Netherlands, Bandırmaspor in Turkey before playing his last professional football at Intercity in 2025. In February 2026, Jozefzoon announced his retirement from professional football.

== Club career ==
=== Ajax ===
A winger and attacking midfielder, Jozefzoon began his career with spells at CTO '70 and AFC. He joined the Ajax Youth Academy in 2006 and signed a three-year professional contract in June 2008. Jozefzoon won his maiden call into the first team squad for the opening match of the 2010–11 Eredivisie season versus FC Groningen and remained an unused substitute during the 2–2 draw. He made his senior debut six days later, replacing Urby Emanuelson at half time during a 4–2 win over SBV Vitesse. He scored his only goal for the club in a 5–0 KNVB Beker third round win over MVV Maastricht on 22 September 2010. After five appearances during the 2010–11 season, Jozefzoon signed a one-year contract extension in June 2011, but spent the 2011–12 season away on loan and was released at the end of the season.

==== NAC Breda (loan) ====
Jozefzoon spent the 2011–12 season on loan at Eredivisie club NAC Breda. He made 17 appearances and scored no goals during his spell.

=== RKC Waalwijk ===
On 25 May 2012, Jozefzoon joined Eredivisie club RKC Waalwijk on a free transfer, signing a two-year contract with an option for a third year. He made 36 appearances and scored seven goals during the 2012–13 season before departing the Mandemakers Stadion in June 2013.

=== PSV Eindhoven ===
In June 2013, Jozefzoon joined Eredivisie giants PSV Eindhoven for a €400,000 fee. Despite making 25 appearances and scoring four goals during his debut season, he failed to fully break into the first team at the Philips Stadion. Jozefzoon's 15 league appearances during the 2014–15 season were enough to win him an Eredivisie winners' medal, the first silverware of his career. After largely falling out of the first team picture through 2015 and 2016 due to an anterior cruciate ligament injury, however he won his second Eredivisie winners' medal during the 2015–16 Jozefzoon left the club in January 2017.

=== Brentford ===
On 27 January 2017, Jozefzoon moved to England to join Championship club Brentford for an undisclosed fee on a deal until the end of the 2016–17 season, with an option to extend for a further year. He made his debut four days later, playing the first 71 minutes of a 3–0 win over Aston Villa at Griffin Park. Jozefzoon scored his first Bees goal on his 16th appearance, with the equaliser in a 1–1 draw with Barnsley on 17 April. He finished the season with 19 appearances and the club extended his contract by two years.

Despite the departure of Jota and Sergi Canós suffering an injury, the signing of Ollie Watkins and the form of Josh Clarke meant that Jozefzoon failed to make the right wing berth his own during the early months of the 2017–18 season. Injury to Rico Henry in September saw Josh Clarke move to left back as cover, which allowed Jozefzoon to establish himself as a first choice wide option. He ended the 2017–18 season with 43 appearances and seven goals.

=== Derby County ===
After a £1.5 million bid from Derby County was rejected by Brentford on 4 July 2018, on 18 July, a follow-up bid of £2.75 million was accepted from Derby for the player. On 19 July, Brentford also accepted a matching rival bid for the player from Leeds United. He signed for Derby on 20 July 2018. He made his debut on 11 August in a 1–4 loss against Leeds United.

On 15 October 2020, he joined Rotherham United on loan for the remainder of the season.

On 14 June 2021, it was announced that he would leave Derby at the end of the season, following the expiry of his contract.

=== Later career ===
He signed for French club Quevilly-Rouen in September 2021.

After a successful trial, Jozefzoon returned to his former club RKC Waalwijk on 4 August 2022, signing a one-year contract.

He signed for Spanish club Intercity in January 2025.

In February 2026, Jozefzoon announced his retirement from professional football.

== International career ==
Jozefzoon won ten caps for the Netherlands at U19 and U21 level. He was part of the Netherlands squads at the 2010 European U19 Championship and 2013 European U21 Championship finals.

Jozefzoon was called up to the Suriname squad for the first time in March 2021. He scored on his debut in a 6–0 win over Aruba. In June 2021 Josefzoon was named to the Suriname squad for the 2021 CONCACAF Gold Cup.

== Personal life ==
Jozefzoon was born in Saint-Laurent-du-Maroni, French Guiana and moved with his Surinamese parents, six brothers and two sisters to the Netherlands at age two.

== Career statistics ==
=== Club ===
Appearances and goals by club, season and competition
Club	Season	League			National cup		League cup		Other		Total	
Club	Season	Division	Apps	Goals	Apps	Goals	Apps	Goals	Apps	Goals	Apps	Goals
Ajax	2010–11	Eredivisie	4	0	1	1	—		0	0	5	1
Ajax	2011–12	Eredivisie	0	0	0	0	—		0	0	0	0
Ajax	Total		4	0	1	1	—		0	0	5	1
NAC Breda (loan)	2011–12	Eredivisie	16	0	1	0	—		—		17	0
RKC Waalwijk	2012–13	Eredivisie	34	7	2	0	—		—		36	7
PSV Eindhoven	2013–14	Eredivisie	16	2	1	1	—		8 (Note: Four appearances in UEFA Champions League; four appearances, one goal in UEFA Europa League)	1	25	4
PSV Eindhoven	2014–15	Eredivisie	15	2	2	0	—		6 (Note: Appearances in UEFA Europa League)	0	23	2
PSV Eindhoven	2015–16	Eredivisie	9	1	2	0	—		0	0	11	1
PSV Eindhoven	2016–17	Eredivisie	5	0	0	0	—		0	0	5	0
PSV Eindhoven	Total		45	5	5	1	—		14	1	64	7
Jong PSV	2013–14	Eerste Divisie	7	3	—		—		—		7	3
Jong PSV	2014–15	Eerste Divisie	1	0	—		—		—		1	0
Jong PSV	2015–16	Eerste Divisie	6	0	—		—		—		6	0
Jong PSV	2016–17	Eerste Divisie	3	1	—		—		—		1	0
Jong PSV	Total		17	4	—		—		—		17	4
Brentford	2016–17	Championship	19	1	—		—		—		19	1
Brentford	2017–18	Championship	39	7	1	0	3	0	—		43	7
Brentford	Total		58	8	1	0	3	0	—		62	8
Derby County	2018–19	Championship	27	2	3	0	3	1	1 (Note: Appearances in Championship play-offs)	0	34	3
Derby County	2019–20	Championship	14	0	0	0	0	0	—		14	0
Derby County	2020–21	Championship	0	0	0	0	0	0	—		0	0
Derby County	Total		41	2	3	0	3	1	1	0	48	3
Rotherham United (loan)	2020–21	Championship	24	0	1	0	0	0	—		25	0
Quevilly-Rouen	2021–22	Ligue 2	24	2	4	0	0	0	1 (Note: Appearance in Ligue 2 relegation play-offs)	0	29	2
RKC Waalwijk	2022–23	Eredivisie	26	5	1	0	—		—		27	5
Bandirmaspor	2023–24	1. Lig	29	4	0	0	—		—		29	4
CF Intercity	2024–25	Primera Federación	1	0	—		—		—		1	0
Career total			319	37	19	0	6	1	16	1	360	39

=== International ===
Appearances and goals by national team and year
National team	Year	Apps	Goals
Suriname	2021	5	1
Suriname	2022	7	0
Suriname	2023	6	0
Total		18	1

Scores and results list Suriname's goal tally first, score column indicates score after each Jozefzoon goal.

List of international goals scored by Florian Jozefzoon
No.	Date	Venue	Opponent	Score	Result	Competition
1	27 March 2021	IMG Academy, Bradenton, United States	Aruba	5–0	6–0	2022 FIFA World Cup qualification

== Honours ==
Ajax

- Eredivisie: 2010–11

PSV

- Eredivisie: 2014–15, 2015–16
