= The Old Man and the Medal =

1956 novel by Ferdinand Oyono

- Author: Ferdinand Oyono
- Original title: Le vieux nègre et la médaille
- Translator: John Reed
- Language: English; French
- Genre: Novel
- Published: 1956
- Publication place: Cameroon
- ISBN: 978-2-264-00962-3

The Old Man and the Medal (Le vieux nègre et la médaille) is a 1956 postcolonial novel by Cameroonian diplomat and writer Ferdinand Oyono.

The novel was translated into English by John Reed in 1967 and republished in 1969 in the influential Heinemann African Writers Series.

== Plot ==
Meka, the main character, is an elderly villager who receives a medal from the French government for the donation of land for a church, but also his two sons who are killed during the World War II.

characters:

- Emeka- in the novel Emeka is the one that was given a medal of friendship by the white man in the 14th of july because of his children that died during the war and also for giving the white man his land for the building of the church. Emeka is also the husband of Kelara.
- Kelara: in the novel Kelara is the wife of Emeka, she takes very good care of the Emeka and also loves him for who he is. She is also the sister of Enamba.
- Enamba: Enamba is a brother to kelara and inlaw to Emeka. He also went to Doum with goat and some food stuff to rejoice with him Emeka
- Amalia: she is the wife of Enamba who also went with him to Doum to rejoice with Emeka for his medal.
- Father Vandermayer: he is the white priest of the church in Doum, he was also present when Emeka was given the medal of friendship.

== Themes ==
Theme of discovery.

Theme of disappointment.

Theme of regret.

== Analysis ==
The novel depicts the problematic relationship between loyal Africans, and their colonial masters.

== Bibliography ==
- Oyono, Ferdinand (1956). Le vieux nègre et la médaille (in French). Paris: 10/18. ISBN 978-2-264-00962-3.
- Oyono, F.; Reed, J. (2013). The Old Man and the Medal. Translated by Reed, John. Waveland Press. ISBN 978-1-4786-1109-7.
