= Sami Belkorchia =

French footballer (born 1995)

Personal information
- Date of birth: 25 January 1995 (age 31)
- Place of birth: Montbrison, France
- Height: 1.80 m (5 ft 11 in)
- Position: Centre-back

Youth career
- Andrézieux
- 2008–2012: Saint-Étienne

Senior career*
Years	Team	Apps	(Gls)
2012–2013	Saint-Étienne II	0	(0)
2013–2014	Angers II	4	(0)
2014–2015	Saint-Chamond		
2015–2017	Montbrison		
2017–2020	Villefranche	55	(1)
2020–2021	Quevilly II	1	(0)
2020–2022	Quevilly	36	(0)
2022	Angoulême	0	(0)
2022–2023	Le Puy	5	(0)
2024	Feurs	8	(0)
2024–2025	Lyon-La Duchère	19	(2)
- * Club domestic league appearances and goals as of 17 May 2025

Sami Belkorchia (born 25 January 1995) is a French professional footballer who plays as a centre-back.

== Club career ==
Belkorchia began his senior career with the reserves of Saint-Étienne and Angers, failing to sign a professional contract. He spent a couple of years with the amateur clubs Saint-Chamond and Montbrison, where he almost quit football. He was scouted by Villefranche in the Championnat National. He transferred to Quevilly in the summer of 2020, and helped them get promoted into the professional Ligue 2 for the 2021–22 Ligue 2 season. He made his professional debut with Quevilly in a 3–0 Ligue 2 loss to Niort on 16 October 2021.

On 22 August 2022, Belkorchia joined Championnat National 2 side Angoulême Charente FC. However, less than three weeks later, Belkorchia moved to newly promoted Championnat National side Le Puy.

== Personal life ==
Born in France, Belkorchia is of Algerian descent.
