= Yassine Bahassa =

French footballer (born 1992)

Personal information
- Date of birth: 21 May 1992 (age 34)
- Place of birth: Sauveterre-de-Guyenne, France
- Height: 1.87 m (6 ft 2 in)
- Position: Forward

Team information
- Current team: Krasava Ypsonas
- Number: 28

Senior career*
Years	Team	Apps	(Gls)
2012–2013	Mérignac		
2013–2015	US Lormont		
2015–2016	US Lège-Cap-Ferret	25	(8)
2016–2019	Stade Bordelais	84	(16)
2019–2020	Avranches	21	(2)
2020–2022	Quevilly-Rouen	59	(1)
2022–2024	FC U Craiova	68	(7)
2024–2025	Nea Salamina	31	(3)
2025–	Krasava Ypsonas	36	(5)
- * Club domestic league appearances and goals as of 1 November 2026 (UTC)

Yassine Bahassa (Arabic: بيانات اللاعب; born 21 May 1992) is a French professional footballer who plays as a forward for Cypriot First Division club Krasava Ypsonas.

== Career ==
In June 2022, Bahassa signed with FC U Craiova in Romania. He left the club on 13 May 2024, after FC U Craiova finished the season in last place and was relegated to Liga II the day prior. Three months later, he signed a contract with Nea Salamis for unknown period.

== Personal life ==
Born in France, Bahassa is of Moroccan descent.

== Honours ==
Stade Bordelais

- Championnat de France Amateur 2: 2016–17
