= Nathan Dekoke =

French footballer (born 1996)

Personal information
- Date of birth: 6 January 1996 (age 30)
- Place of birth: Aubervilliers, France
- Height: 1.80 m (5 ft 11 in)
- Positions: Centre back; left back

Youth career
- –2016: Saint-Étienne

Senior career*
Years	Team	Apps	(Gls)
2016	Saint-Étienne	1	(0)
2016–2018	Amiens	1	(0)
2017–2018	→ Boulogne (loan)	14	(1)
2018–2019	→ Avranches (loan)	13	(0)
2020–2021	SC Lyon (Note: Sporting Club Lyon was called AS Lyon-Duchère until June 2020.)	33	(6)
2021–2022	Quevilly-Rouen	26	(0)
2022–2023	FBBP01	27	(1)
2023–2024	Villefranche	20	(2)
2024–2025	Le Mans	10	(0)
2025–2026	Villefranche	21	(0)
- * Club domestic league appearances and goals as of 23 June 2026

Nathan Dekoke (born 6 January 1996) is a French footballer who plays as a defender.

== Club career ==
Dekoke is a youth exponent from Saint-Étienne. He made his first team debut on 16 December 2015 against Paris Saint-Germain playing the full Coupe de la Ligue match.

On 27 July 2016, he signed a three-year contract with Amiens. He made just one Ligue 2 appearance and one Coupe de la Ligue appearance in the 2016–17 season, and by October 2017 had not made any appearances for the senior team in the 2017–18 season. He joined US Boulogne on loan until the end of the season on 20 October 2017. He was loaned out again, for the 2018–19 season, to US Avranches.

Having been released by Amiens, Dekoke signed for AS Lyon-Duchère in January 2020. The club was rebranded Sporting Club Lyon in June 2020.

On 15 July 2022, Dekoke signed with FBBP01.

== Personal life ==
Born in France, Dekoke is of DR Congolese descent.
