= Romain Lejeune =

French footballer (born 1991)

Personal information
- Date of birth: 21 May 1991 (age 35)
- Place of birth: Drancy, France
- Height: 1.81 m (5 ft 11 in)
- Position: Goalkeeper

Youth career
- 2008–2011: Le Havre

Senior career*
| Years | Team | Apps | (Gls) |
| 2011–2012 | ES Wasquehal | 28 | (0) |
| 2012–2013 | US Ivry | 33 | (0) |
| 2013–2015 | Istres | 33 | (0) |
| 2015–2016 | Fleury-Mérogis | 24 | (0) |
| 2016–2018 | Créteil | 14 | (0) |
| 2018–2019 | Athlético Marseille | 13 | (0) |
| 2019 | SC Octeville-sur-Mer | | |
| 2020 | Gonfreville | 3 | (0) |
| 2020–2022 | Quevilly-Rouen | 11 | (0) |
- * Club domestic league appearances and goals as of 14 May 2022

Romain Lejeune (born 21 May 1991) is a French professional footballer who plays as a goalkeeper. He previously played in Ligue 2 with Istres, and has also represented Wasquehal, Ivry, Fleury-Mérogis, Créteil, Athlético Marseille, SC Octeville-sur-Mer and Quevilly-Rouen.
