= Damon Bansais =

French footballer (born 1994)

Personal information
- Full name: Damon Alain Bansais
- Date of birth: 8 January 1994 (age 32)
- Place of birth: Villeneuve Saint-Georges, France
- Height: 1.77 m (5 ft 10 in)
- Position: Right-back

Team information
- Current team: Avranches
- Number: 27

Senior career*
Years	Team	Apps	(Gls)
2013–2015	Laval II	34	(3)
2015–2021	Pau FC	102	(1)
2016–2017	Pau FC II	13	(1)
2021–2024	Quevilly-Rouen	45	(0)
2023	→ FBBP01 (loan)	8	(0)
2023–2024	→ Avranches (loan)	16	(1)
2024–	Avranches	30	(0)
- * Club domestic league appearances and goals as of 4 December 2025

Damon Bansais (born 8 January 1994) is a French professional footballer who plays as a right-back for Championnat National 1 club Avranches.

== Career ==
A youth product of Laval, Bansais moved to Pau FC in 2015 and helped them get promoted into the Ligue 2 in 2020. Bansais made his professional debut with Pau in a 3–0 Ligue 2 loss to Valenciennes FC on 22 August 2020.

Bansais terminated his contract with Pau in January 2021, signing for Quevilly-Rouen, where he rejoined his former coach at Pau, Bruno Irles.

On 3 January 2023, Bansais was loaned to FBBP01. On 18 October 2023, he moved on a new loan to Avranches.
