= Yann Boé-Kane =

French footballer (born 1991)

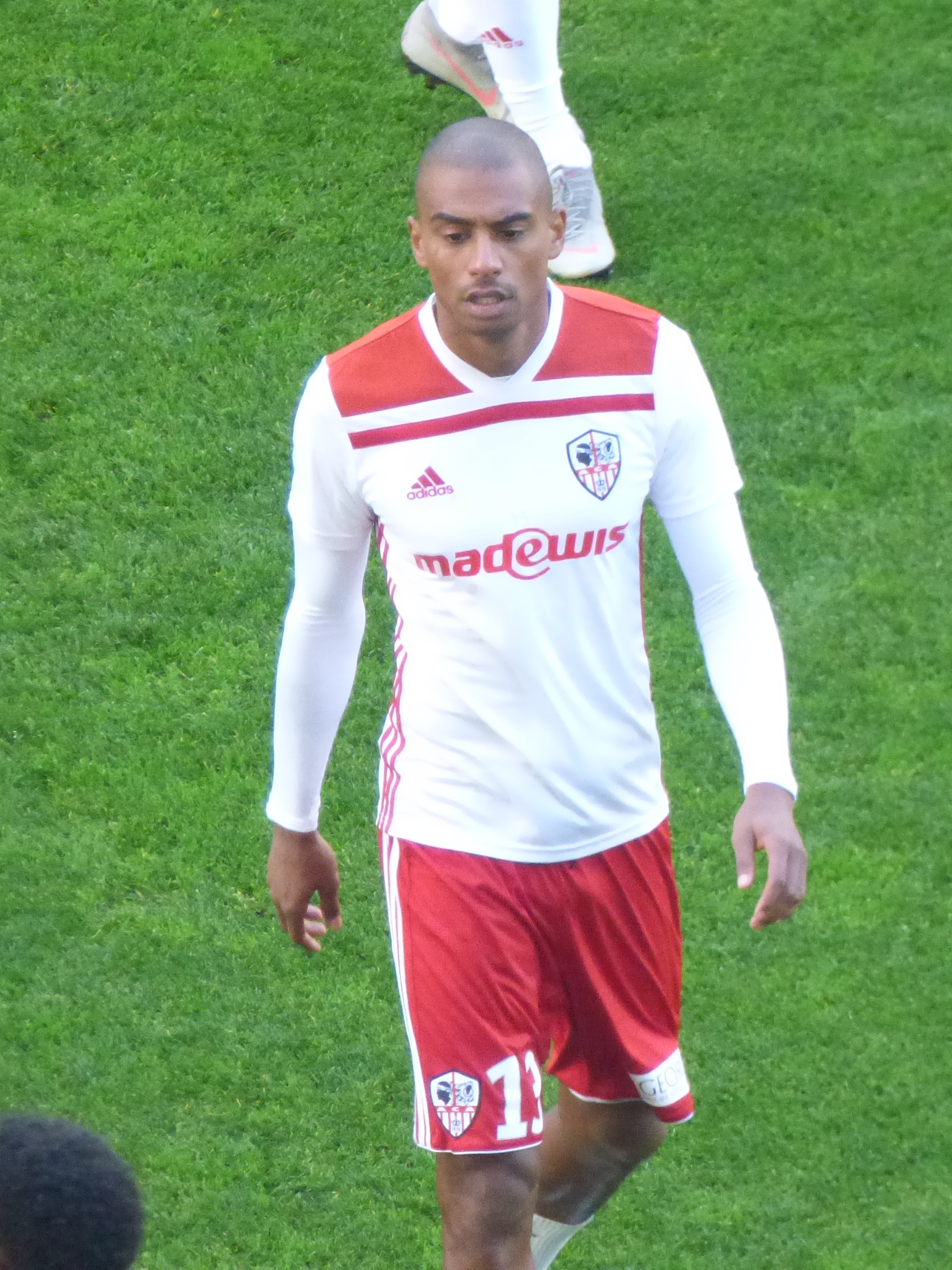
- Boé-Kane in 2018

Personal information
- Date of birth: 5 April 1991 (age 35)
- Place of birth: Angoulême, France
- Height: 1.85 m (6 ft 1 in)
- Position: Defensive midfielder

Youth career
- Sochaux

Senior career*
Years	Team	Apps	(Gls)
2011–2013	Vannes	46	(4)
2013–2015	Auxerre	25	(1)
2015	Ergotelis	13	(1)
2015–2016	Red Star	27	(0)
2016–2019	Ajaccio	100	(1)
2019–2020	Le Mans	26	(2)
2021	Astra Giurgiu	19	(0)
2021–2023	Quevilly-Rouen	52	(2)
- * Club domestic league appearances and goals as of 28 June 2023

Yann Boé-Kane (born 5 April 1991) is a French professional footballer who plays as a midfielder.

== Personal life ==
Yann Boé-Kane was born in Angoulême in western France. He holds French and Senegalese nationalities.

== Career ==
After making his debut in the French semi-professional leagues with Vannes, Boé-Kane made his full professional debut when he joined Auxerre in 2013, with a 0–0 Ligue 2 draw against Nancy.

After spending six months in Greece with Ergotelis, Boé-Kane joined Ligue 2 newcomers Red Star in June 2015.

After having a successful campaign with Red Star, in which the team finished fifth in the 2015–16 Ligue 2 season, Boé-Kane joined AC Ajaccio on a two-year deal, in July 2016.

On 20 June 2019, after three years at Ajaccio, Boé-Kane joined newly promoted Ligue 2 club Le Mans FC. He left at the end of the 2019–20 after Le Mans were relegated.

On 16 July 2021, he signed with Quevilly-Rouen.
