= Ukrit Wongmeema =

Thai footballer (born 1991)

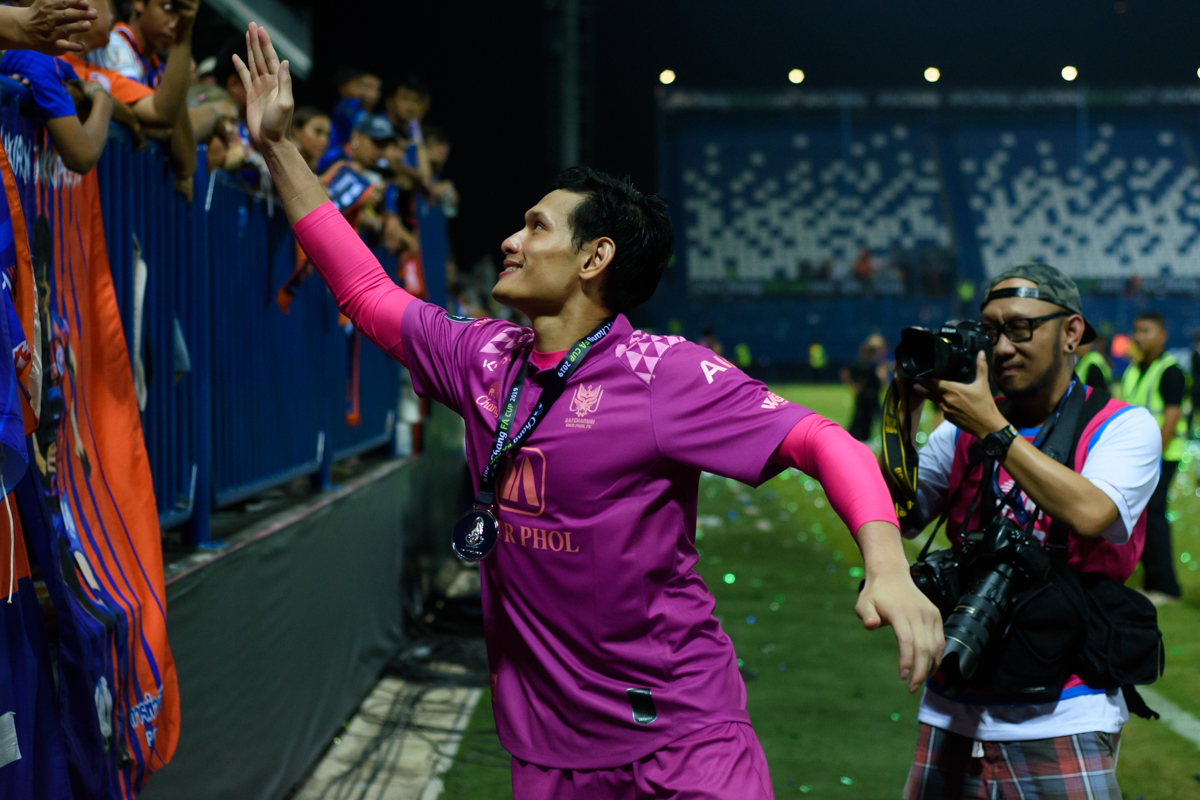

Personal information
- Full name: Ukrit Wongmeema
- Date of birth: 9 July 1991 (age 35)
- Place of birth: Phitsanulok, Thailand
- Height: 1.85 m (6 ft 1 in)
- Position: Goalkeeper

Team information
- Current team: Ratchaburi
- Number: 97

Youth career
- 2007–2009: Suankularb Wittayalai School
- 2009: Muangthong United

Senior career*
Years	Team	Apps	(Gls)
2009	Muangthong United	0	(0)
2009–2011	Buriram United	17	(0)
2012–2022	Ratchaburi Mitr Phol	217	(0)
2023	Phrae United	10	(0)
2023–2024	Police Tero	1	(0)
2024–2025	Kasetsart	15	(0)
2025–	Ratchaburi	2	(0)

International career^{‡}
2009	Thailand U19	14	(0)
2011–2013	Thailand U23	9	(0)
Medal record
Thailand under-19
AFF U-19 Youth Championship
Winner	AFF U-19 Youth Championship 2009	Football
Thailand under-23
Sea Games
Gold medal – first place	Sea Games 2013	Football
- * Club domestic league appearances and goals as of 26 May 2024 (UTC) ‡ National team caps and goals as of 1 December 2010

Ukrit Wongmeema (Thai: อุกฤษณ์ วงศ์มีมา; born 9 July 1991 in Phitsanulok, Thailand) is a Thai professional footballer from Thailand. He plays as a goalkeeper for Thai League 1 club Ratchaburi.

== International career ==
He debut for U-19 team in 2010 AFC U-19 Championship against Saudi Arabia He represented Thailand U23 in the 2011 Southeast Asian Games and the 2013 Southeast Asian Games.

== Honours ==
=== Club ===
Buriram

- Regional League Division 2 Champions (1): 2010
- Thai Division 1 League Champions (1): 2011

=== International ===
Thailand U-19

- AFF U-19 Youth Championship (1): 2009

Thailand U-23

- Sea Games Gold Medal (1); 2013
