= Jérémy Corinus =

Martiniquais footballer (born 1997)

Personal information
- Full name: Jérémy Jimmy Théophile Corinus
- Date of birth: 16 March 1997 (age 29)
- Place of birth: Évry, France
- Height: 1.88 m (6 ft 2 in)
- Position: Defender

Team information
- Current team: Jeonnam Dragons
- Number: 91

Youth career
- –2015: Bordeaux

Senior career*
Years	Team	Apps	(Gls)
2015–2017	Bordeaux B	25	(2)
2017–2018	Amiens B	10	(0)
2018–2019	Gozzano	0	(0)
2019–2020	Ajaccio B	15	(3)
2019–2021	Ajaccio	12	(0)
2021–2022	Fermana	8	(0)
2022	Academica Clinceni	5	(0)
2022	Farul Constanța	5	(0)
2023	Chindia Târgoviște	14	(0)
2023–2024	Othellos Athienou	15	(1)
2024–2025	Enosis Neon Paralimni	28	(1)
2025–2026	Ratchaburi	9	(0)
2026–	Jeonnam Dragons	6	(0)

International career
2023–	Martinique	1	(0)
- * Club domestic league appearances and goals as of 8 August 2026

Jérémy Jimmy Théophile Corinus (born 16 March 1997) is a professional footballer who plays as a defender K League 2 club Jeonnam Dragons. Born in metropolitan France, he plays for the Martinique national team.

== Club career ==
On 11 February 2020, Corinus sign with Ajaccio first team.

On 18 August 2021, he moved to Italy and signed for Serie C club Fermana. On 31 January 2022, his contract with Fermana was terminated by mutual consent.

== Personal life ==
Born in Metropolitan France, Corinus is Martiniquais and Malagasy descent.

== Honours ==
Farul Constanța

- Liga I: 2022–23
