= Alassane Diaby =

Footballer (born 1995)

Personal information
- Full name: Alassane-Méba Diaby
- Date of birth: 6 January 1995 (age 31)
- Place of birth: Saint-Denis, France
- Height: 1.85 m (6 ft 1 in)
- Position: Defender

Team information
- Current team: Quevilly-Rouen

Youth career
- 2012–2015: Monaco

Senior career*
Years	Team	Apps	(Gls)
2012–2015	Monaco B	22	(0)
2015–2016	Lierse	28	(1)
2016–2018	Osmanlispor	8	(0)
2018	Septemvri Sofia	6	(0)
2019–2020	Pau	21	(1)
2020–2022	Quevilly-Rouen	49	(3)
2022–2023	Tuzla City	10	(0)
2023–2025	Nancy	33	(1)
2025–2026	Aubagne	29	(0)
2026–	Quevilly-Rouen	0	(0)

International career^{‡}
2013	France U19	3	(0)
2016	Mali U20	2	(0)
2016	Mali	1	(0)
- * Club domestic league appearances and goals as of 23 June 2026 ‡ National team caps and goals as of 20 May 2016

Alassane-Méba Diaby (born 6 January 1995) is a professional footballer who plays as a defender for Ligue 3 club Quevilly-Rouen. Born in France, he represented the Mali national team.

== Club career ==
Diaby was born in Saint-Denis, France. He signed his first professional contract with Belgian club Lierse.

On 29 June 2018, Diaby signed with Bulgarian club Septemvri Sofia.

In June 2019, Diaby signed for Pau FC for the 2019–20 season. He stayed in Championnat National for the 2020–21 season, signing with Quevilly-Rouen in June 2020.

== International career ==
Diaby was born and raised in France and is of Malian and Ivorian descent. At international level, he was a France youth international having represented his nation at under-19 level. He was called up to the Mali national under-20 football team for the 2016 Toulon Tournament, and made his debut in a 1–0 loss to the Czech Republic U20s.

Diaby made his debut for the senior Mali national football team in a friendly 1–0 loss to Nigeria on 27 May 2016.

== Honours ==
Nancy

- Championnat National: 2024–25
