= Souleymane Diallo (journalist) =

Guinean journalist (1945–2026)

- Born: 17 November 1945; Labé, Guinea
- Died: 1 June 2026 (aged 80); Montréal, Quebec, Canada
- Occupation: Journalist

Souleymane Diallo (17 November 1945 – 1 June 2026) was a Guinean journalist.

== Life and career ==
Born in 1945 at Labé, Diallo married Hadja Fatoumata Bah, with whom he had many children. In 1992, he founded the satirical newspaper Le Lynx, which he modeled after Le Canard enchaîné following his fleeing the Guinean autocratic regime for Ivory Coast. In 1995, he was imprisoned over an article about the Miss Guinea ECOWAS pageant and again in 1996 for an article related to the 1996 Guinean coup attempt. In 2012, he founded the radio station Le lynx FM, which successfully found a public audience. He worked with the Association Guinéenne des Editeurs de la Presse Indépendante, Reporters Without Borders, and the African Press Forum. In 2022, he was presented as a Grand Officer of the Ordre National du Kolatier. A day of tribute was organized on 29 October 2022.

Diallo died at Montreal, Quebec, Canada on 1 June 2026.
