= Cyril Zabou =

French footballer (born 1996)

Personal information
- Full name: Bohui Cyril Zabou
- Date of birth: 18 June 1996 (age 30)
- Place of birth: Bondy, France
- Height: 1.75 m (5 ft 9 in)
- Position: Midfielder

Senior career*
Years	Team	Apps	(Gls)
2014–2016	Drancy	7	(0)
2017–2018	Bourges	20	(6)
2018	Bobigny	1	(0)
2018–2020	Bourges	33	(12)
2020–2021	Chambly	21	(0)
2021–2022	Quevilly-Rouen	18	(0)
2022–2024	Botoșani	32	(0)
- * Club domestic league appearances and goals as of 23 October 2023

Bohui Cyril Zabou (born 18 June 1996) is a French professional footballer who plays as midfielder.

== Early life ==
Zabou was born in Bondy, France. He is Ivorian by descent, and acquired French nationality on 16 August 2005, through the collective effect of his mother's naturalization.

== Professional career ==
=== Chambly ===
On 14 May 2020, Zabou signed his first professional contract with Chambly. He made his professional debut with Chambly in a 2–1 Ligue 2 loss to Grenoble on 12 September 2020.

=== Quevilly-Rouen ===
On 28 July 2021, he moved to Quevilly-Rouen on a one-year contract.

=== Botoșani ===
On 20 September 2022, Zabou agreed to a two-year deal at Botoșani.
