= Souleymane Démé =

Chadian actor

- Born: Souleymane Démé
- Occupation: Actor

Souleymane Démé (born 1986) is a Chadian actor. He is most notable for the critically acclaimed role in the film GriGris in which he played the title role.

== Filmography ==
Year	Film	Role	Genre	Ref.
2000	L'invité	Himself	TV series	
2013	GriGris	Grigris	Film	
