= Souleymane Touré =

Guinean politician

Deputy in the National Assembly (Guinea), Rapporteur of the Commission Health-Youth-Sports-Art and Culture
- Incumbent
- Assumed office 2020
- President: Alpha Conde
- Succeeded by: Mamadouba Sankhon
- Constituency: Forecariah

Personal details
- Born: 25 June 1980 (age 46) Conakry, Guinea
- Education: Gamal Abdel Nasser University of Conakry
- Portfolio: training in triage at the SAMU (Service d'Aide Médicale Urgente) (Urgent Medical Aid Service) in Toulouse, Founded First Aid Action Guinée

Souleymane Touré (born 25 June 1980) is a Guinean politician who represents the constituency of Forécariah in the National Assembly. He is a member of the majority Rally of the Guinean People Party of former president Alpha Conde.

== Biography ==
Touré received his medical degree from Gamal Abdel Nasser University of Conakry in 2010, specializing in gunshot wounds at the trauma care center at Donka Hospital. In 2012, he attended a resident training program on triage at the SAMU (Urgent Medical Aid Service) in Toulouse. He then returned and began working at the Clinique Abroise Paré, first as the doctor for the Simfer mining project site, and then as the medical coordinator for mining sites. In 2011, he conducted environmental impact studies for the Simfer mining project in Simandou with SNC-Lavalin. In 2014, he became the referral physician for SIMFER, and in 2015 for the European Union election observation mission in Guinea. In 2016, he founded his own clinic, First Aid Action Guinée.
