= Garland Gbelle =

French footballer (born 1992)

Personal information
- Date of birth: 16 December 1992 (age 33)
- Place of birth: Montbéliard, France
- Height: 1.79 m (5 ft 10 in)
- Position: Midfielder

Team information
- Current team: Concarneau
- Number: 10

Senior career*
Years	Team	Apps	(Gls)
2012–2015	Dinan-Léhon	74	(9)
2015–2016	Luçon	25	(4)
2016–2017	Les Herbiers	31	(2)
2017–2018	Cholet	25	(4)
2018–2019	Paris FC B	17	(0)
2019–2020	Cholet	23	(3)
2020–2021	SC Lyon	31	(1)
2021–2024	Quevilly-Rouen	104	(11)
2024–2025	Nea Salamina	25	(2)
2025–	Concarneau	30	(2)
- * Club domestic league appearances and goals as of 23 June 2026

Garland Gbelle (born 16 December 1992) is a French professional footballer who plays as a midfielder for Ligue 3 club Concarneau.

== Personal life ==
Garland Gbelle was born in Montbéliard in eastern France and has French nationality. He is of Ivorian descent.

== Career ==
Gbelle trained with Cercle Paul-Bert Bréqugny-Rennes and started his senior career with Dinan-Léhon FC at the fifth level of French football in 2012. Noticed as part of the team which progressed to the last 64 of the 2014–15 Coupe de France, he was signed by Championnat National side Luçon FC in the summer of 2015. When the club went bankrupt in the summer of 2016, he signed for Les Herbiers at the same level. In the summer of 2017 he moved to a third National club, Cholet.

On 18 June 2018, Gbelle signed his first professional contract with Paris FC in Ligue 2. Gbelle made his professional debut with Paris FC in a 0–0 (4–3) Coupe de la Ligue penalty shootout win over AC Ajaccio on 14 August 2018. In June 2019, he left the club, having not made a single appearance in the league, re-signing for Cholet on a two-year deal, with an optional extension of one year should the club win promotion.

After Cholet failed to challenge for promotion during the 2019–20 season, Gbelle left to seek promotion with SC Lyon in June 2020. SC Lyon would go on to finish last in the Championnat National in the 2020–21 season, being the only team to suffer relegation.

On 9 June 2021, Gbelle signed for recently-promoted Ligue 2 side Quevilly-Rouen. He eventually became the club's captain.

On 13 July 2024, Gbelle signed for Cypriot First Division club Nea Salamis Famagusta.
