= Clive Wake =

South African translator

Clive Wake is a critic, editor and translator of modern African and French literature.

Born in Cape Town, Clive Wake studied at Cape Town University and the Sorbonne. He taught at the University of Rhodesia, and the University of Kent at Canterbury, where he is Emeritus Professor of French and African Literature. He served as Lord Mayor of Canterbury for the Liberal Democrats party and was Vice-Chancellor of Chaucer College Canterbury.

== Works ==
- (ed. with John Reed) A Book of African Verse, London: Heinemann Educational, 1964. African Writers Series 8. Later edition published (1984) as A New Book of African Verse.
- (tr. with John Reed) Prose and Poetry, by Léopold Sédar Senghor. London: Oxford University Press, 1965.
- (ed.) An Anthology of African and Malagasy Poetry in French. London: Oxford University Press, 1965.
- (tr. with John Reed) Nocturnes, by Léopold Sédar Senghor. London: Heinemann Educational, 1969. African Writers Series 71
- (tr.) The Money-Order with White Genesis by Sembène Ousmane. London: Heinemann Educational Books, 1972. African Writers Series 92. (Translation of Vehi ciosane; ou, Blanche-genèse; suivi du Mandat, Paris: Présence Africaine, 1965.)
- (ed. and tr. with John Reed) French African Verse, London: Heinemann Educational Books, 1972. African Writers Series 106.
- (tr.) The Wound, by Malick Fall. London: Heinemann, 1973. Translated from the French La Plaie.
- The Novels of Pierre Loti, The Hague: Mouton, 1974
- (tr. with John Reed) Translations from the Night: Selected Poems of Jean-Joseph Rabearivelo. London: Heinemann. African Writers Series 167
- (with Martin Banham) African Theatre Today, 1976
- (tr.) Xala, by Sembène Ousmane, 1976
- (tr. with John Reed) Wirriyamu by Williams Sassine, 1980
- (tr.) The Seven Solitudes of Lorsa Lopez, by Sony Lab'Ou Tansi. Oxford; Portsmouth, NH: Heinemann, 1995. African Writers Series
