= Ottman Dadoune =

French footballer (born 1994)

Personal information
- Date of birth: 26 July 1994 (age 32)
- Place of birth: Nîmes, France
- Height: 1.90 m (6 ft 3 in)
- Position: Forward

Team information
- Current team: GOAL FC
- Number: 11

Youth career
- Bourgoin-Jallieu

Senior career*
Years	Team	Apps	(Gls)
2013–2018	Bourgoin-Jallieu	53	(15)
2018	Louhans-Cuiseaux	15	(11)
2018–2019	Chambly	30	(6)
2018	Chambly B	2	(2)
2019–2020	Villefranche	20	(4)
2020–2022	Quevilly-Rouen	40	(13)
2021–2022	Quevilly-Rouen B	3	(1)
2022–2023	Le Puy	24	(3)
2023	Olympic Charleroi	9	(2)
2024	Fréjus Saint-Raphaël	12	(2)
2024–2025	Bourg-Péronnas	32	(8)
2025	Ratchaburi	1	(0)
2025–2026	Paris 13 Atletico	18	(2)
2026–	GOAL FC	2	(0)
- * Club domestic league appearances and goals as of 5 September 2026

Ottman Dadoune (born 26 July 1994) is a French professional footballer who plays as a forward for French Championnat National 1 club GOAL FC.

== Personal life ==
Born in France, Dadoune is of Algerian descent.
