= Souleymane Cissé (footballer, born 1990) =

Senegalese footballer (born 1990)

Personal information
- Date of birth: 2 August 1990 (age 36)
- Place of birth: Guédiawaye, Senegal
- Height: 1.78 m (5 ft 10 in)
- Position: Midfielder

Team information
- Current team: Louhans-Cuiseaux

Senior career*
Years	Team	Apps	(Gls)
2008–2014	Diambars		
2014–	Louhans-Cuiseaux	11	(0)

International career
2010–2013	Senegal	3	(0)
- * Club domestic league appearances and goals as of 03:51, 20 September 2021 (UTC)

Souleymane Cissé (born 2 August 1990) is a Senegalese professional footballer who plays as a midfielder for Championnat National 1 club Louhans-Cuiseaux.

== Club career ==
Cissé began his career with the Senegalese club Diambars, having stayed with them from 2008 to 2014. On 18 August 2014, he transferred to France with Louhans-Cuiseaux.

== International career ==
Cissé debuted for the Senegal national team in a 1–0 friendly loss to Mexico on 10 May 2010.
