= Souleymane Sylla (footballer) =

Guinean footballer

Personal information
- Full name: Souleymane Sylla
- Date of birth: 5 May 1984 (age 42)
- Place of birth: Pita, Guinea
- Height: 1.82 m (6 ft 0 in)
- Position: Striker

Team information
- Current team: AC Ajaccio

Senior career*
Years	Team	Apps	(Gls)
2002–2004	FC Istres	5	(0)
2005–2006	Cap-Ferret	-	(-)
2006–2007	BSC Young Boys		
2007–2008	AC Ajaccio	6	(0)
- * Club domestic league appearances and goals as of 01:43, 5 February 2018 (UTC)

Souleymane Sylla (born 5 May 1984) is a professional footballer who plays as a striker.
