= Souleymane Cissé (footballer, born 1999) =

Senegalese footballer (born 1999)

Personal information
- Full name: Souleymane Djimou Cissé
- Date of birth: 1 January 1999 (age 27)
- Place of birth: Diattacounda, Senegal
- Height: 1.90 m (6 ft 3 in)
- Position: Defender

Senior career*
Years	Team	Apps	(Gls)
–2019	Stade de Mbour		
2019–2021	Celta B	7	(0)
2021	→ Arenteiro	10	(0)
2021–2022	Quevilly-Rouen	8	(0)
2021–2022	Quevilly-Rouen B	8	(0)
2022–2024	Górnik Łęczna	46	(2)
2024–2026	Polonia Warsaw	24	(0)

International career
2019	Senegal U20	10	(0)
- * Club domestic league appearances and goals as of 15:25, 29 May 2026 (UTC)

Souleymane Djimou Cissé (born 1 January 1999) is a Senegalese professional footballer who plays as a defender.

== Club career ==
In 2019, Cissé signed for the reserves of Spanish La Liga side Celta, where manager Jacobo Montes said he "has a major drawback, and that is that he does not speak Spanish and he has a significant communication problem. He only speaks French and it is not a language that the members of the coaching staff speak". In 2021, he was sent on loan to Arenteiro in the Spanish fourth division.

In 2021, Cissé signed for French second division club Quevilly-Rouen. On 28 August 2021, he debuted for Quevilly-Rouen during a 0-1 loss to Paris FC.

On 13 August 2022, he joined Polish I liga side Górnik Łęczna on a two-year contract.

On 25 June 2024, he penned a two-year deal with another second division club Polonia Warsaw.

== International career ==
He represented Senegal at the 2019 FIFA U-20 World Cup.

== Honours ==
Polonia Warsaw II

- V liga Masovia I: 2025–26
