= List of French football transfers summer 2020 =

This is a list of French football transfers for the 2020 summer transfer window. Only transfers featuring Ligue 1 and Ligue 2 are listed.

== Ligue 1 ==
Note: Flags indicate national team as has been defined under FIFA eligibility rules. Players may hold more than one non-FIFA nationality.

=== Paris Saint-Germain ===
In:

No.	Pos.	Nation	Player
9	FW	ARG	Mauro Icardi (from (Italy) Inter, previously on loan)
12	MF	BRA	Rafinha (from (Spain) Barcelona, previously on loan at (Spain) Celta)
15	MF	POR	Danilo Pereira (on loan from (Portugal) Porto)
16	GK	ESP	Sergio Rico (from (Spain) Sevilla, previously on loan)
18	FW	ITA	Moise Kean (on loan from (England) Everton)
24	DF	ITA	Alessandro Florenzi (on loan from (Italy) Roma, previously on loan at (Spain) Valencia)
30	GK	FRA	Alexandre Letellier (from Orléans)

Out:

No.	Pos.	Nation	Player
2	DF	BRA	Thiago Silva (to (England) Chelsea)
9	FW	URU	Edinson Cavani (to (England) Manchester United)
12	DF	BEL	Thomas Meunier (to (Germany) Borussia Dortmund)
17	FW	CMR	Eric Maxim Choupo-Moting (to (Germany) Bayern Munich)
29	FW	FRA	Arnaud Kalimuendo (on loan to Lens)
30	GK	POL	Marcin Bułka (on loan to (Spain) Cartagena)
35	DF	FRA	Tanguy Nianzou (to (Germany) Bayern Munich)
36	DF	FRA	Loïc Mbe Soh (to (England) Nottingham Forest)
38	MF	FRA	Adil Aouchiche (to Saint-Étienne)
40	GK	FRA	Garissone Innocent (on loan to Caen)
—	GK	FRA	Alphonse Areola (on loan to (England) Fulham, previously on loan at (Spain) Real Madrid)

=== Marseille ===
In:

No.	Pos.	Nation	Player
3	DF	ESP	Álvaro (from (Spain) Villarreal, previously on loan)
5	DF	ARG	Leonardo Balerdi (on loan from (Germany) Borussia Dortmund)
11	FW	BRA	Luis Henrique (from (Brazil) Botafogo)
17	MF	FRA	Michaël Cuisance (on loan from (Germany) Bayern Munich)
22	MF	FRA	Pape Gueye (from Le Havre)
25	DF	JPN	Yuto Nagatomo (from (Turkey) Galatasaray)

Out:

No.	Pos.	Nation	Player
17	DF	FRA	Bouna Sarr (to (Germany) Bayern Munich)
22	MF	FRA	Grégory Sertic (free agent)
27	MF	FRA	Maxime Lopez (on loan to (Italy) Sassuolo)
31	DF	COM	Abdallah Ali Mohamed (on loan to (Belgium) Zulte Waregem)
40	GK	FRA	Ahmadou Dia (on loan to (Netherlands) Dordrecht)

=== Rennes ===
In:

No.	Pos.	Nation	Player
5	DF	BRA	Dalbert (on loan from (Italy) Inter Milan, previously on loan at (Italy) Fiorentina)
6	DF	MAR	Nayef Aguerd (from Dijon)
7	FW	FRA	Martin Terrier (from Lyon)
9	FW	FRA	Serhou Guirassy (from Amiens)
16	GK	SEN	Alfred Gomis (from Dijon)
18	FW	BEL	Jérémy Doku (from (Belgium) Anderlecht)
24	DF	ITA	Daniele Rugani (on loan from (Italy) Juventus)

Out:

No.	Pos.	Nation	Player
6	MF	SWE	Jakob Johansson (to (Sweden) Göteborg)
7	MF	BRA	Raphinha (to (England) Leeds United)
9	FW	FRA	Jordan Siebatcheu (on loan to (Switzerland) Young Boys)
10	MF	FRA	Rafik Guitane (on loan to (Portugal) Marítimo)
15	DF	MAD	Jérémy Morel (to Lorient)
16	GK	SEN	Édouard Mendy (to (England) Chelsea)
19	FW	TUR	Metehan Güçlü (on loan to Valenciennes)
21	DF	FRA	Joris Gnagnon (loan return to (Spain) Sevilla)
26	DF	FRA	Jérémy Gelin (on loan to (Belgium) Antwerp)
31	DF	FRA	Sacha Boey (on loan to Dijon)
32	FW	FRA	Lucas Da Cunha (to Nice)
40	GK	COD	Riffi Mandanda (free agent to (Norway) Kongsvinger)
—	DF	FRA	Lilian Brassier (on loan to Brest, previously on loan at Valenciennes)
—	MF	FRA	Hakim El Mokeddem (on loan to Sète, previously on loan at Laval)
—	DF	CIV	Souleyman Doumbia (to Angers, previously on loan)
—	MF	FRA	Denis-Will Poha (to (Portugal) Vitória Guimarães, previously on loan)
—	FW	FRA	Armand Laurienté (to Lorient, previously on loan)
—	FW	FRA	Jordan Tell (to Clermont, previously on loan at Caen)

=== Lille ===
In:

No.	Pos.	Nation	Player
1	GK	GRE	Orestis Karnezis (from (Italy) Napoli)
5	DF	NED	Sven Botman (from (Netherlands) Jong Ajax, previously on loan at (Netherlands) Heerenveen)
9	FW	CAN	Jonathan David (from (Belgium) Gent)
15	MF	MEX	Eugenio Pizzuto (from (Mexico) Pachuca)
17	FW	TUR	Burak Yılmaz (from (Turkey) Beşiktaş)
19	FW	FRA	Isaac Lihadji (from Marseille B)
—	MF	ENG	Angel Gomes (from (England) Manchester United)

Out:

No.	Pos.	Nation	Player
1	GK	BRA	Léo Jardim (on loan to (Portugal) Boavista)
3	DF	MAR	Saad Agouzoul (on loan to (Belgium) Mouscron)
4	DF	BRA	Gabriel (to (England) Arsenal)
7	FW	NGA	Victor Osimhen (to (Italy) Napoli)
9	FW	FRA	Loïc Rémy (to (Turkey) Çaykur Rizespor)
20	MF	ARG	Nicolás Gaitán (to (Portugal) Braga)
—	GK	BFA	Hervé Koffi (on loan to (Belgium) Mouscron, previously on loan at (Portugal) B-SAD)
—	DF	CIV	Yves Dabila (on loan to (Belgium) Mouscron, previously on loan at (Belgium) Cercle Brugge)
—	MF	ANG	Show (on loan to (Portugal) Boavista, previously on loan at (Portugal) B-SAD)
—	MF	ENG	Angel Gomes (on loan to (Portugal) Boavista)
—	MF	MLI	Rominigue Kouamé (loan extension to Troyes)
—	DF	PAR	Júnior Alonso (to (Brazil) Atlético Mineiro, previously on loan at (Argentina) Boca Juniors)

=== Nice ===
In:

No.	Pos.	Nation	Player
3	DF	BRA	Robson Bambu (from (Brazil) Athletico Paranaense)
6	MF	FRA	Morgan Schneiderlin (from (England) Everton)
11	FW	FRA	Amine Gouiri (from Lyon)
13	DF	FRA	Hassane Kamara (from Reims)
22	MF	POR	Rony Lopes (on loan from (Spain) Sevilla)
23	DF	SUI	Jordan Lotomba (from (Switzerland) Young Boys)
29	MF	FRA	Jeff Reine-Adélaïde (on loan from Lyon)
33	DF	AUT	Flavius Daniliuc (from (Germany) Bayern Munich II)
—	FW	IRL	Ayodeji Sotona (from (England) Manchester United youth)
—	DF	CIV	Armel Zohouri (from (Ivory Coast) Abidjan)
—	MF	CIV	Trazié Thomas (from (Ivory Coast) Abidjan)
—	FW	FRA	Lucas Da Cunha (from Rennes)

Out:

No.	Pos.	Nation	Player
3	DF	FRA	Gautier Lloris (to Auxerre)
5	DF	DEN	Riza Durmisi (loan return to (Italy) Lazio)
6	DF	SEN	Moussa Wagué (loan return to (Spain) Barcelona)
10	FW	ALG	Adam Ounas (loan return to (Italy) Napoli)
14	FW	CMR	Ignatius Ganago (to Lens)
15	DF	FRA	Patrick Burner (to Nîmes)
16	GK	FRA	Yannis Clementia (free agent)
22	MF	FRA	Arnaud Lusamba (free agent to Amiens)
23	DF	FRA	Malang Sarr (to (England) Chelsea)
25	MF	FRA	Wylan Cyprien (on loan to (Italy) Parma)
29	DF	FRA	Christophe Hérelle (to Brest)
34	MF	POR	Pedro Brazão (on loan to (Switzerland) Lausanne)
35	FW	FRA	Evann Guessand (on loan to (Switzerland) Lausanne)
—	DF	CIV	Armel Zohouri (on loan to (Switzerland) Lausanne)
—	MF	CIV	Trazié Thomas (on loan to (Switzerland) Lausanne)
—	FW	FRA	Lucas Da Cunha (on loan to (Switzerland) Lausanne)
—	DF	CIV	Ibrahim Cissé (on loan to Châteauroux, previously on loan at (Portugal) Famalicão)
—	FW	FRA	Ihsan Sacko (on loan to (Italy) Cosenza, previously on loan at Troyes)
—	DF	FRA	Yanis Hamache (to (Portugal) Boavista, previously on loan at Red Star)
—	MF	FRA	Jean-Victor Makengo (to (Italy) Udinese, previously on loan at Toulouse)
—	MF	FRA	Eddy Sylvestre (to (Belgium) Standard Liège, previously on loan at Auxerre)
—	MF	CMR	Adrien Tameze (to (Italy) Hellas Verona, previously on loan at (Italy) Atalanta)

=== Reims ===
In:

No.	Pos.	Nation	Player
14	MF	KOS	Valon Berisha (from (Italy) Lazio, previously on loan at (Germany) Fortuna Düsseldorf)
17	FW	GRE	Tasos Donis (from (Germany) VfB Stuttgart, previously on loan)
18	FW	SCO	Fraser Hornby (from (England) Everton, previously on loan at (Belgium) Kortrijk)
28	DF	BEL	Thibault De Smet (from (Belgium) Sint-Truiden)

Out:

No.	Pos.	Nation	Player
4	MF	TOG	Alaixys Romao (to Guingamp)
6	DF	FRA	Axel Disasi (to Monaco)
13	DF	FRA	Hassane Kamara (to Nice)
14	DF	FRA	Sambou Sissoko (on loan to Quevilly-Rouen)
16	GK	FRA	Nicolas Lemaître (on loan to Quevilly-Rouen)
19	FW	FRA	Timothé Nkada (on loan to (Denmark) AaB)
20	MF	FRA	Tristan Dingomé (to Troyes)
26	MF	FRA	Nolan Mbemba (to Le Havre)
27	FW	FRA	Virgile Pinson (to Quevilly-Rouen)
—	MF	FRA	Ilan Kebbal (on loan to Dunkerque, previously on loan at Sporting Club Lyon)

=== Lyon ===
In:

No.	Pos.	Nation	Player
3	DF	ALG	Djamel Benlamri (from (Saudi Arabia) Al-Shabab)
7	FW	CMR	Karl Toko Ekambi (from (Spain) Villarreal, previously on loan)
12	MF	BRA	Lucas Paquetá (from (Italy) Milan)
19	DF	TUR	Cenk Özkaçar (from (Turkey) Altay)
20	DF	ITA	Mattia De Sciglio (on loan from (Italy) Juventus)
30	GK	GER	Julian Pollersbeck (from (Germany) Hamburger SV)
—	GK	CMR	Boris Essele (from Amiens)

Out:

No.	Pos.	Nation	Player
2	DF	FRA	Mapou Yanga-Mbiwa (free agent)
3	DF	DEN	Joachim Andersen (on loan to (England) Fulham)
4	DF	BRA	Rafael (to (Turkey) İstanbul Başakşehir)
7	FW	FRA	Martin Terrier (to Rennes)
10	FW	BFA	Bertrand Traoré (to (England) Aston Villa)
16	GK	SUI	Anthony Racioppi (to Dijon)
17	MF	FRA	Jeff Reine-Adélaïde (on loan to Nice)
19	FW	FRA	Amine Gouiri (to Nice)
20	DF	BRA	Marçal (to (England) Woverhampton Wanderers)
23	DF	NED	Kenny Tete (to (England) Fulham)
26	DF	FRA	Oumar Solet (to (Austria) RB Salzburg)
28	DF	MLI	Youssouf Koné (on loan to (Spain) Elche)
29	MF	FRA	Lucas Tousart (loan return to (Germany) Hertha BSC)
30	GK	ROU	Ciprian Tătărușanu (to (Italy) Milan)
—	GK	CMR	Boris Essele (on loan to Bourg-en-Bresse)
—	MF	SEN	Pape Cheikh Diop (on loan to Dijon, previously on loan at (Spain) Celta)
—	FW	FRA	Lenny Pintor (loan extension to Troyes)

=== Montpellier ===
In:

No.	Pos.	Nation	Player
1	GK	SUI	Jonas Omlin (from (Switzerland) Basel)
19	FW	ENG	Stephy Mavididi (from (Italy) Juventus, previously on loan at Dijon)
28	FW	CGO	Béni Makouana (from (Republic of the Congo) Diables Noirs)

Out:

No.	Pos.	Nation	Player
1	GK	ARG	Gerónimo Rulli (loan return to (Spain) Real Sociedad)
15	MF	FRA	Bilal Boutobba (to Chamois Niortais)
19	FW	SEN	Souleymane Camara (retired)
21	MF	FRA	Kylian Kaïboué (on loan to Sète)
29	MF	RUS	Amir Adouyev (to (Russia) Akhmat Grozny)
—	FW	FRA	Bastian Badu (loan extension to Chambly)
—	MF	FRA	Killian Sanson (to Evian, previously on loan at Quevilly-Rouen)

=== Monaco ===
In:

No.	Pos.	Nation	Player
12	DF	BRA	Caio Henrique (from (Spain) Atlético Madrid, previously on loan at (Brazil) Grêmio)
20	DF	FRA	Axel Disasi (from Reims)
27	FW	NED	Anthony Musaba (from (Netherlands) NEC)
30	GK	ITA	Vito Mannone (from (England) Reading, previously on loan at (Denmark) Esbjerg)
31	FW	GER	Kevin Volland (from (Germany) Bayer Leverkusen)
35	MF	POR	Florentino (on loan from (Portugal) Benfica)

Out:

No.	Pos.	Nation	Player
1	GK	CRO	Danijel Subašić (free agent)
6	MF	FRA	Tiémoué Bakayoko (loan return to (England) Chelsea)
8	MF	POR	Adrien Silva (loan return to (England) Leicester City)
14	FW	SEN	Keita Baldé (on loan to (Italy) Sampdoria)
15	DF	FRA	Jean Marcelin (on loan to (Belgium) Cercle Brugge)
16	GK	SUI	Diego Benaglio (retired)
18	DF	FRA	Arthur Zagre (on loan to Dijon)
20	FW	ALG	Islam Slimani (loan return to (England) Leicester City)
25	DF	POL	Kamil Glik (to (Italy) Benevento)
27	FW	NED	Anthony Musaba (on loan to (Belgium) Cercle Brugge)
28	DF	BRA	Jorge (on loan to (Switzerland) Basel)
30	GK	SEN	Seydou Sy (free agent)
34	FW	FRA	Moussa Sylla (to (Netherlands) Utrecht)
39	DF	GER	Benjamin Henrichs (on loan to (Germany) RB Leipzig)
—	DF	FRA	Giulian Biancone (loan extension to (Belgium) Cercle Brugge)
—	GK	FRA	Loïc Badiashile (on loan to (Spain) Las Rozas, previously on loan at Amiens)
—	DF	FRA	Julien Serrano (on loan to (Scotland) Livingston, previously on loan at (Belgium) Cercle Brugge)
—	DF	ITA	Antonio Barreca (on loan to (Italy) Fiorentina, previously on loan at (Italy) Genoa)
—	MF	CIV	Jean-Eudes Aholou (on loan to Strasbourg, previously on loan at Saint-Étienne)
—	MF	BEL	Adrien Bongiovanni (on loan to (Netherlands) Den Bosch, previously on loan at Béziers)
—	MF	POR	Gil Dias (on loan to (Portugal) Famalicão, previously on loan at (Spain) Granada)
—	MF	GNB	Pelé (on loan to (Portugal) Rio Ave, previously on loan at (England) Reading)
—	DF	ENG	Jonathan Panzo (to Dijon, previously on loan at (Belgium) Cercle Brugge)
—	MF	FRA	Kévin N'Doram (to Metz, previously on loan)
—	MF	MLI	Adama Traoré (to (Turkey) Hatayspor, previously on loan at Metz)
—	MF	BEL	Nacer Chadli (to (Turkey) İstanbul Başakşehir, previously on loan at (Belgium) Anderlecht)
—	FW	RSA	Lyle Foster (to (Portugal) Vitória Guimarães, previously on loan at (Belgium) Cercle Brugge)
—	FW	ESP	Jordi Mboula (to (Spain) Mallorca, previously on loan at (Spain) Huesca)

=== Strasbourg ===
In:

No.	Pos.	Nation	Player
6	MF	CIV	Jean-Eudes Aholou (on loan from Monaco, previously on loan at Saint-Étienne)
8	FW	GHA	Majeed Waris (from (Portugal) Porto, previously on loan)
18	MF	FRA	Mahamé Siby (from Valenciennes)
28	FW	SEN	Habib Diallo (from Metz)

Out:

No.	Pos.	Nation	Player
3	DF	SEN	Abdallah Ndour (to Sochaux)
6	MF	FRA	Jérémy Grimm (free agent)
10	MF	FRA	Benjamin Corgnet (free agent)
40	GK	FRA	Louis Pelletier (to Reims B)
—	MF	TUN	Moataz Zemzemi (on loan to Avranches, previously on loan at (Tunisia) Club Africain)

=== Angers ===
In:

No.	Pos.	Nation	Player
1	GK	FRA	Paul Bernardoni (from Bordeaux, previously on loan at Nîmes)
3	DF	CIV	Souleyman Doumbia (from Rennes, previously on loan)
6	DF	FRA	Enzo Ebosse (from Le Mans)
9	FW	FRA	Loïs Diony (from Saint-Étienne)
11	MF	FRA	Jimmy Cabot (from Lorient)
13	MF	MAR	Sofiane Boufal (from (England) Southampton)
18	MF	FRA	Ibrahim Amadou (on loan from (Spain) Sevilla, previously on loan at (Spain) Leganés)
21	FW	FRA	Mohamed-Ali Cho (from (England) Everton youth)
37	FW	FRA	Kevin Bemanga (from Paris B)

Out:

No.	Pos.	Nation	Player
2	DF	FRA	Rayan Aït-Nouri (on loan to (England) Wolverhampton Wanderers)
9	FW	FRA	Wilfried Kanga (to (Turkey) Kayserispor)
14	MF	FRA	Anthony Gomez Mancini (on loan to (England) Burnley U23)
18	MF	FRA	Baptiste Santamaria (to (Germany) SC Freiburg)
21	FW	CHA	Casimir Ninga (on loan to (Turkey) Sivasspor)
26	DF	FRA	Théo Pellenard (free agent to Valenciennes)
40	GK	FRA	Anthony Mandrea (on loan to Cholet)
—	MF	FRA	Vincent Pajot (to Metz, previously on loan)
—	FW	BEL	Baptiste Guillaume (to Valenciennes, previously on loan)
—	DF	FRA	Ibrahim Cissé (to Dunkerque, previously on loan at Paris)
—	MF	COD	Harrison Manzala (to (Turkey) Kayserispor, previously on loan at Le Mans)

=== Bordeaux ===
In:

No.	Pos.	Nation	Player
8	MF	FRA	Hatem Ben Arfa (free agent)

Out:

No.	Pos.	Nation	Player
8	MF	ESP	Rubén Pardo (on loan to (Spain) Leganés)
11	FW	GUI	François Kamano (to (Russia) Lokomotiv Moscow)
17	MF	MAR	Youssef Aït Bennasser (loan return to Monaco)
24	MF	FRA	Albert Lottin (to (Netherlands) Jong Utrecht)
—	DF	FRA	Alexandre Lauray (on loan to Villefranche, previously on loan at Dunkerque)
—	MF	MAR	Yassine Benrahou (to Nîmes, previously on loan)
—	GK	FRA	Paul Bernardoni (to Angers, previously on loan at Nîmes)
—	FW	GAB	Aaron Boupendza (to (Turkey) Hatayspor, previously on loan at (Portugal) Feirense)
—	FW	FRA	Alexandre Mendy (to Caen, previously on loan at Brest)

=== Nantes ===
In:

No.	Pos.	Nation	Player
5	MF	ESP	Pedro Chirivella (from (England) Liverpool)
20	FW	FRA	Jean-Kévin Augustin (from (Germany) RB Leipzig, previously on loan at (England) Leeds United)
21	DF	CMR	Jean-Charles Castelletto (from Brest)
24	DF	FRA	Sébastien Corchia (free agent)
27	FW	NGA	Moses Simon (from (Spain) Levante, previously on loan)

Out:

No.	Pos.	Nation	Player
10	MF	PER	Cristian Benavente (loan return to (Egypt) Pyramids)
13	DF	MLI	Molla Wagué (on loan to Amiens)
16	GK	FRA	Alexandre Olliero (on loan to Pau)
18	MF	COD	Samuel Moutoussamy (on loan to (Netherlands) Fortuna Sittard)
20	FW	FRA	Élie Youan (on loan to (Switzerland) St. Gallen)
21	MF	SVN	Rene Krhin (free agent)
25	DF	TOG	Josué Homawoo (to Lorient B)
—	MF	BRA	Lucas Evangelista (on loan to (Brazil) Bragantino, previously on loan at (Portugal) Vitória Guimarães)
—	GK	FRA	Quentin Braat (to Chamois Niortais, previously on loan)
—	GK	FRA	Maxime Dupé (to Toulouse, previously on loan at Clermont)

=== Brest ===
In:

No.	Pos.	Nation	Player
3	DF	FRA	Lilian Brassier (on loan from Rennes, previously on loan at Valenciennes)
9	FW	FRA	Franck Honorat (from Saint-Étienne)
12	MF	FRA	Romain Philippoteaux (from Nîmes)
15	FW	BEN	Steve Mounié (from (England) Huddersfield Town)
20	DF	FRA	Ronaël Pierre-Gabriel (on loan from (Germany) 1. FSV Mainz 05)
21	MF	FRA	Romain Faivre (from Monaco B)
23	DF	FRA	Christophe Hérelle (from Nice)
26	FW	FRA	Jérémy Le Douaron (from Briochin)
29	MF	POR	Heriberto Tavares (from (Portugal) Benfica B, previously on loan at (Portugal) Boavista)

Out:

No.	Pos.	Nation	Player
6	MF	FRA	Ibrahima Diallo (to (England) Southampton)
8	FW	FRA	Yoann Court (to Caen)
9	FW	FRA	Kévin Mayi (to (Turkey) Ümraniyespor)
12	DF	BEN	David Kiki (to (Bulgaria) Montana)
15	FW	FRA	Alexandre Mendy (loan return to Bordeaux)
16	GK	FRA	Donovan Léon (to Auxerre)
20	DF	FRA	Gaëtan Belaud (to Paris)
21	DF	CMR	Jean-Charles Castelletto (to Nantes)
23	MF	FRA	Mathias Autret (to Auxerre)
25	MF	FRA	Samuel Grandsir (loan return to Monaco)
—	DF	FRA	Guillaume Buon (on loan to Bastia-Borgo, previously on loan at Avranches)
—	FW	FRA	Derick Osei (to (England) Oxford United, previously on loan at Béziers)

=== Metz ===
In:

No.	Pos.	Nation	Player
4	MF	FRA	Kévin N'Doram (from Monaco, previously on loan)
9	FW	FRA	Thierry Ambrose (from (England) Manchester City, previously on loan)
12	MF	FRA	Warren Tchimbembé (from Troyes)
13	FW	SEN	Lamine Gueye (from (Senegal) Génération Foot, previously on loan at Pau)
14	MF	FRA	Vincent Pajot (from Angers, previously on loan)
23	DF	MLI	Boubakar Kouyaté (from Troyes)
24	FW	BEL	Aaron Leya Iseka (on loan from Toulouse)
27	FW	CPV	Vagner (from Saint-Étienne, previously on loan at Nancy)
30	GK	FRA	Marc-Aurèle Caillard (from Guingamp)

Out:

No.	Pos.	Nation	Player
10	MF	FRA	Marvin Gakpa (to Paris)
20	FW	SEN	Habib Diallo (to Strasbourg)
22	MF	BEL	Sami Lahssaini (on loan to (Belgium) Seraing)
24	MF	FRA	Renaud Cohade (free agent)
25	MF	MLI	Adama Traoré (loan return to Monaco)
30	GK	FRA	Guillaume Dietsch (on loan to (Belgium) Seraing)
—	FW	SEN	Cheikh Sabaly (loan extension to Pau)
—	MF	GAM	Ablie Jallow (on loan to (Belgium) Seraing, previously on loan at Ajaccio)
—	MF	FRA	Raouf Mroivili (free agent, previously on loan at (Belgium) Seraing)
—	DF	LUX	Laurent Jans (to (Belgium) Standard Liège, previously on loan at (Germany) SC Paderborn 07)
—	MF	LUX	Vincent Thill (to (Portugal) Nacional, previously on loan at Orléans)
—	MF	HAI	Leverton Pierre (to Dunkerque, previously on loan)
—	MF	FRA	Gauthier Hein (to Auxerre, previously on loan at Valenciennes)
—	MF	ARG	Gerónimo Poblete (to (Chile) La Serena, previously on loan at (Argentina) San Lorenzo)

=== Dijon ===
In:

No.	Pos.	Nation	Player
1	GK	SUI	Anthony Racioppi (from Lyon)
2	DF	FRA	Sacha Boey (on loan from Rennes)
4	DF	ENG	Jonathan Panzo (from Monaco, previously on loan at (Belgium) Cercle Brugge)
6	MF	SEN	Pape Cheikh Diop (on loan from Lyon, previously on loan at (Spain) Celta)
8	MF	FRA	Junior Dina Ebimbe (on loan from Paris Saint-Germain B, previously on loan at Le Havre)
9	MF	KOS	Bersant Celina (from (England) Swansea City)
11	FW	SEN	Moussa Konaté (from Amiens)
12	DF	FRA	Arthur Zagre (on loan from Monaco)
13	DF	ECU	Aníbal Chalá (on loan from (Mexico) Toluca)
15	FW	CIV	Roger Assalé (from (Switzerland) Young Boys, previously on loan at (Spain) Leganés)
16	GK	BEN	Saturnin Allagbé (from Chamois Niortais)
29	MF	ROU	Alex Dobre (from (England) Bournemouth, previously on loan at (England) Wigan Athletic)

Out:

No.	Pos.	Nation	Player
1	GK	ISL	Rúnar Alex Rúnarsson (to (England) Arsenal)
2	DF	GLP	Mickaël Alphonse (to Amiens)
4	DF	MAR	Nayef Aguerd (to Rennes)
6	DF	FRA	Théo Barbet (on loan to Bastia-Borgo)
8	MF	FRA	Bryan Soumaré (on loan to Sochaux)
9	FW	ENG	Stephy Mavididi (loan return to (Italy) Juventus)
11	FW	CPV	Júlio Tavares (to (Saudi Arabia) Al-Faisaly)
15	MF	FRA	Florent Balmont (retired)
16	GK	SEN	Alfred Gomis (to Rennes)
19	FW	VEN	Jhonder Cádiz (loan return to (Portugal) Benfica)
20	MF	FRA	Romain Amalfitano (to (Saudi Arabia) Al-Faisaly)
27	DF	MAR	Hamza Mendyl (loan return to (Germany) FC Schalke 04)
—	FW	FRA	Rayan Philippe (on loan to Nancy, previously on loan at Toulon)
—	MF	FRA	Enzo Loiodice (to (Spain) Las Palmas, previously on loan at (England) Wolverhampton Wanderers)

=== Saint-Étienne ===
In:

No.	Pos.	Nation	Player
4	DF	GRE	Panagiotis Retsos (on loan from (Germany) Bayer Leverkusen, previously on loan at (England) Sheffield United)
5	DF	FRA	Timothée Kolodziejczak (from (Mexico) Tigres, previously on loan)
14	FW	CIV	Jean-Philippe Krasso (from Épinal)
17	MF	FRA	Adil Aouchiche (from Paris Saint-Germain)
19	MF	CMR	Yvan Neyou (on loan from (Portugal) Braga B)

Out:

No.	Pos.	Nation	Player
1	GK	FRA	Théo Vermot (to Orléans)
3	DF	SUI	Léo Lacroix (free agent)
4	DF	FRA	William Saliba (loan return to (England) Arsenal)
6	MF	FRA	Yann M'Vila (to (Greece) Olympiacos)
9	FW	FRA	Loïs Diony (to Angers)
14	FW	FRA	Franck Honorat (to Brest)
17	MF	CIV	Jean-Eudes Aholou (loan return to Monaco)
23	DF	ESP	Sergi Palencia (on loan to (Spain) Leganés)
24	DF	FRA	Loïc Perrin (retired)
25	MF	SEN	Assane Dioussé (on loan to (Turkey) Ankaragücü)
29	MF	FRA	Yohan Cabaye (free agent)
32	DF	FRA	Wesley Fofana (to (England) Leicester City)
—	FW	FRA	Lamine Ghezali (on loan to Sporting Lyon)
—	DF	GRE	Alexandros Katranis (on loan to (Turkey) Hatayspor, previously on loan at (Greece) Atromitos)
—	GK	FRA	Alexis Guendouz (to (Algeria) USM Alger, previously on loan at Pau)
—	FW	CPV	Vagner (to Metz, previously on loan at Nancy)
—	FW	SEN	Makhtar Gueye (to (Belgium) Oostende, previously on loan at Nancy)

=== Nîmes ===
In:

No.	Pos.	Nation	Player
3	DF	NOR	Birger Meling (from (Norway) Rosenborg)
7	MF	SWE	Niclas Eliasson (from (England) Bristol City)
13	FW	ALG	Karim Aribi (from (Tunisia) Étoile Sahel)
18	MF	PAR	Andrés Cubas (from (Argentina) Talleres)
21	DF	FRA	Patrick Burner (from Nice)
22	MF	MAR	Yassine Benrahou (from Bordeaux, previously on loan)
30	GK	FRA	Baptiste Reynet (from Toulouse)

Out:

No.	Pos.	Nation	Player
7	MF	FRA	Romain Philippoteaux (to Brest)
11	FW	MKD	Vlatko Stojanovski (on loan to Chambly)
18	MF	FRA	Theo Valls (to (Switzerland) Servette)
30	GK	FRA	Paul Bernardoni (loan return to Bordeaux)
—	DF	FRA	Théo Sainte-Luce (on loan to Red Star, previously on loan at Gazélec)

=== Lorient ===
In:

No.	Pos.	Nation	Player
1	GK	FRA	Matthieu Dreyer (from Amiens)
2	DF	GLP	Andreaw Gravillon (on loan from (Italy) Inter, previously on loan at (Italy) Ascoli)
7	FW	CIV	Stéphane Diarra (from Le Mans)
8	MF	ENG	Trevoh Chalobah (on loan from (England) Chelsea, previously on loan at (England) Huddersfield Town)
11	MF	FRA	Quentin Boisgard (from Toulouse)
13	FW	NGA	Terem Moffi (from (Belgium) Kortrijk)
21	DF	MAD	Jérémy Morel (from Rennes)
23	MF	FRA	Thomas Monconduit (from Amiens)
27	FW	AUT	Adrian Grbić (from Clermont)
28	FW	FRA	Armand Laurienté (from Rennes, previously on loan)
40	GK	FRA	Thomas Callens (from Caen)

Out:

No.	Pos.	Nation	Player
1	GK	FRA	Romain Cagnon (to Créteil)
4	DF	FRA	Joris Sainati (to Ajaccio)
7	DF	FRA	Jonathan Martins Pereira (retired)
8	MF	FRA	Maxime Etuin (to Le Mans)
11	FW	COD	Yann Kitala (loan return to Lyon B)
23	DF	FRA	Quentin Lecoeuche (on loan to Ajaccio)
27	MF	FRA	Jimmy Cabot (to Angers)
37	MF	FRA	Julien Ponceau (on loan to Rodez)
40	GK	FRA	Maxime Pattier (on loan to Briochin)
—	GK	FRA	Illan Meslier (to (England) Leeds United, previously on loan)
—	DF	FRA	Mamadou Kamissoko (to Pau, previously on loan)
—	FW	FRA	Gaëtan Courtet (to Ajaccio, previously on loan)
—	DF	GAB	Wilfried Ebane (free agent, previously on loan at Dunkerque)
—	DF	FRA	Peter Ouaneh (to Concarneau, previously on loan at Le Puy)
—	FW	GUI	Mohamed Mara (to Évian, previously on loan at Paris)
—	FW	CIV	Moussa Guel (to Valenciennes, previously on loan at Quevilly-Rouen)

=== Lens ===
In:

No.	Pos.	Nation	Player
3	DF	GUI	Issiaga Sylla (on loan from Toulouse)
4	DF	FRA	Loïc Badé (from Le Havre)
8	MF	CIV	Seko Fofana (from (Italy) Udinese)
10	MF	COD	Gaël Kakuta (on loan from Amiens)
11	DF	FRA	Jonathan Clauss (from (Germany) Arminia Bielefeld)
14	DF	ARG	Facundo Medina (from (Argentina) Talleres)
25	FW	FRA	Corentin Jean (from Toulouse, previously on loan)
27	FW	CMR	Ignatius Ganago (from Nice)
29	FW	FRA	Arnaud Kalimuendo (on loan from Paris Saint-Germain)
30	GK	VEN	Wuilker Faríñez (on loan from (Colombia) Millonarios)

Out:

No.	Pos.	Nation	Player
6	MF	FRA	Manuel Perez (to Grenoble)
9	FW	FRA	Gaëtan Robail (on loan to Guingamp)
11	FW	FRA	Mouaad Madri (free agent)
14	FW	GUI	Jules Keita (on loan to (Bulgaria) CSKA Sofia)
27	MF	BEL	Guillaume Gillet (to (Belgium) Charleroi)
29	DF	BRA	Vítor Costa (loan return to (Brazil) Inter Lages)
30	GK	FRA	Thomas Vincensini (on loan to Bastia)
34	MF	FRA	Tom Ducrocq (on loan to Bastia)
—	DF	SEN	Arial Mendy (to (Switzerland) Servette, previously on loan at Orléans)

== Ligue 2 ==
Note: Flags indicate national team as has been defined under FIFA eligibility rules. Players may hold more than one non-FIFA nationality.

=== Amiens ===
In:

No.	Pos.	Nation	Player
3	DF	ENG	Adam Lewis (on loan from (England) Liverpool U23)
5	DF	MLI	Molla Wagué (on loan from Nantes)
9	FW	NGA	Stephen Odey (on loan from (Belgium) Genk)
10	MF	FRA	Arnaud Lusamba (free agent from Nice)
12	MF	GHA	Emmanuel Lomotey (from (Spain) Extremadura)
13	DF	GLP	Mickaël Alphonse (from Dijon)
16	GK	GLP	Yohann Thuram-Ulien (from Le Mans)
19	FW	COD	Chadrac Akolo (from (Germany) VfB Stuttgart, previously on loan)
23	MF	SEN	Amadou Ciss (from (Netherlands) Fortuna Sittard)

Out:

No.	Pos.	Nation	Player
3	DF	ITA	Arturo Calabresi (loan return to (Italy) Bologna)
6	MF	FRA	Thomas Monconduit (to Lorient)
7	MF	IRN	Saman Ghoddos (on loan to (England) Brentford)
8	MF	RSA	Bongani Zungu (on loan to (Scotland) Rangers)
9	FW	FRA	Serhou Guirassy (to Rennes)
10	MF	COD	Gaël Kakuta (on loan to Lens)
12	DF	MLI	Bakaye Dibassy (to (United States) Minnesota United)
13	DF	FRA	Christophe Jallet (retired)
14	DF	NOR	Haitam Aleesami (to (Russia) Rostov)
15	FW	SEN	Moussa Konaté (to Dijon)
16	GK	FRA	Matthieu Dreyer (to Lorient)
21	FW	BEL	Isaac Mbenza (loan return to (England) Huddersfield Town)
22	MF	FRA	Madih Talal (to (Spain) Las Rozas)
24	MF	FRA	Mathieu Bodmer (retired)
27	DF	CMR	Aurélien Chedjou (to (Turkey) Adana Demirspor)
28	FW	MLI	Fousseni Diabaté (loan return to (England) Leicester City)
29	FW	FRA	Quentin Cornette (to Le Havre)
30	GK	CMR	Boris Essele (to Lyon)
38	FW	FRA	Ulrick Eneme Ella (to (England) Brighton U23)
40	GK	FRA	Loïc Badiashile (loan return to Monaco)
—	DF	FRA	Jordan Lefort (to (Switzerland) Young Boys, previously on loan)
—	MF	POL	Rafał Kurzawa (free agent, previously on loan at (Denmark) Esbjerg)

=== Toulouse ===
In:

No.	Pos.	Nation	Player
3	DF	COL	Deiver Machado (from (Belgium) Gent)
9	FW	ENG	Rhys Healey (from (England) Milton Keynes Dons)
14	MF	NED	Branco van den Boomen (from (Netherlands) De Graafschap)
15	FW	CIV	Vakoun Issouf Bayo (on loan from (Scotland) Celtic)
17	MF	NED	Stijn Spierings (from (Bulgaria) Levski Sofia)
30	GK	FRA	Maxime Dupé (from Nantes, previously on loan at Clermont)
31	MF	BEL	Brecht Dejaegere (on loan from (Belgium) Gent)

Out:

No.	Pos.	Nation	Player
7	FW	CIV	Max Gradel (to (Turkey) Sivasspor)
9	FW	FRA	Yaya Sanogo (free agent)
10	FW	BEL	Aaron Leya Iseka (on loan to Metz)
11	MF	FRA	Quentin Boisgard (to Lorient)
12	DF	GUI	Issiaga Sylla (on loan to Lens)
13	DF	FRA	Mathieu Gonçalves (on loan to Le Mans)
14	MF	TOG	Mathieu Dossevi (to (Turkey) Denizlispor)
15	DF	FRA	Nicolas Isimat-Mirin (loan return to (Turkey) Beşiktaş)
17	MF	CIV	Ibrahim Sangaré (to (Netherlands) PSV)
21	MF	FRA	William Vainqueur (loan return to (Turkey) Antalyaspor)
27	MF	FRA	Jean-Victor Makengo (loan return to Nice)
30	GK	FRA	Baptiste Reynet (to Nîmes)
40	GK	CRO	Lovre Kalinić (loan return to (England) Aston Villa)
—	FW	FRA	Corentin Jean (to Lens, previously on loan)
—	MF	ENG	John Bostock (free agent, previously on loan at (England) Nottingham Forest)

=== Ajaccio ===
In:

No.	Pos.	Nation	Player
4	MF	FRA	Mickaël Barreto (from Auxerre)
5	MF	FRA	Riad Nouri (from (Turkey) Ümraniyespor)
9	FW	FRA	Gaëtan Courtet (from Lorient, previously on loan)
11	DF	FRA	Quentin Lecoeuche (on loan from Lorient)
19	MF	FRA	Alassane N'Diaye (from Clermont)
25	FW	CGO	Bevic Moussiti-Oko (from Le Mans)
27	MF	FRA	Vincent Marchetti (from Nancy)
28	DF	FRA	Joris Sainati (from Lorient)

Out:

No.	Pos.	Nation	Player
5	MF	FRA	Lucas Pellegrini (on loan to Le Puy)
7	MF	BFA	Cyrille Bayala (loan return to Lens)
11	MF	FRA	Mattéo Tramoni (to (Italy) Cagliari)
12	FW	GNB	Joseph Mendes (to Chamois Niortais)
13	MF	GAB	Clech Loufilou (free agent)
14	FW	FRA	Alexis Flips (loan return to Lille B)
18	MF	FRA	Johan Cavalli (retired)
19	FW	BEL	Hugo Cuypers (loan return to (Greece) Olympiacos)
22	MF	FRA	Kévin Lejeune (retired)
26	MF	GAM	Ablie Jallow (loan return to Metz)
29	FW	USA	Maki Tall (to (Belgium) Francs Borains)
34	MF	FRA	Félix Tomi (to Le Mans)

=== Troyes ===
In:

No.	Pos.	Nation	Player
5	MF	FRA	Tristan Dingomé (from Reims)
6	MF	MLI	Rominigue Kouamé (loan extension from Lille)
11	FW	FRA	Lenny Pintor (loan extension from Lyon)
12	FW	ENG	Levi Lumeka (from (Portugal) Varzim)
13	DF	FRA	Gabriel Mutombo (from Orléans)
24	FW	FRA	Alimami Gory (on loan from (Belgium) Cercle Brugge)
26	FW	CGO	Dylan Saint-Louis (from (Belgium) Beerschot)

Out:

No.	Pos.	Nation	Player
3	DF	MLI	Boubakar Kouyaté (to Metz)
12	MF	FRA	Warren Tchimbembé (to Metz)
13	FW	FRA	Ihsan Sacko (loan return to Nice)
26	FW	CIV	Chris Bedia (loan return to (Belgium) Charleroi)
27	DF	SEN	Pape Souaré (free agent)
35	DF	FRA	Rémy Vita (to (Germany) Bayern Munich II)

=== Clermont ===
In:

No.	Pos.	Nation	Player
1	GK	FRA	Arthur Desmas (from Rodez)
3	DF	FRA	Julien Boyer (from Quevilly-Rouen)
9	FW	FRA	Jordan Tell (from Rennes, previously on loan at Caen)
16	GK	FRA	Lucas Margueron (from Lyon B)
24	MF	BEN	Jodel Dossou (from (Austria) Hartberg)
32	DF	BIH	Muamer Aljic (from Chamois Niortais B, previously on loan at Andrézieux)
—	MF	AUT	Muhammed Cham (from (Austria) Admira Wacker)

Out:

No.	Pos.	Nation	Player
1	GK	FRA	Maxime Dupé (loan return to Nantes)
5	DF	FRA	Till Cissokho (on loan to Austria Lustenau)
9	FW	AUT	Adrian Grbić (to Lorient)
11	MF	FRA	Alassane N'Diaye (to Ajaccio)
13	MF	GHA	Blankson Anoff (on loan to Austria Lustenau)
15	FW	ESP	Mario González (to (Spain) Villarreal)
26	FW	MTQ	Julio Donisa (to Le Mans)
29	MF	FRA	Naël Jaby (on loan to Austria Lustenau)
34	MF	BEL	Brandon Baiye (on loan to Austria Lustenau)
—	MF	AUT	Muhammed Cham (on loan to (Denmark) Vendsyssel)
—	MF	FRA	Bryan Teixeira (on loan to Orléans, previously on loan at Concarneau)

=== Le Havre ===
In:

No.	Pos.	Nation	Player
9	FW	FRA	Nabil Alioui (from Monaco B)
11	FW	FRA	Quentin Cornette (from Amiens)
13	FW	MAR	Khalid Boutaïb (free agent)
18	MF	FRA	Nolan Mbemba (from Reims)
27	DF	FRA	Pierre Gibaud (from Grenoble)

Out:

No.	Pos.	Nation	Player
9	MF	FRA	Ateef Konaté (to (England) Nottingham Forest U23)
11	FW	ZIM	Tino Kadewere (loan return to Lyon)
13	FW	GHA	Ebenezer Assifuah (to Pau)
18	MF	CTA	Amos Youga (to (Bulgaria) CSKA Sofia)
20	DF	FRA	Baba Traoré (free agent)
23	MF	FRA	Junior Dina Ebimbe (loan return to Paris Saint-Germain B)
24	MF	FRA	Pape Gueye (to Marseille)
25	DF	HUN	Barnabás Bese (to (Belgium) OH Leuven)
28	DF	FRA	Loïc Badé (to Lens)
—	DF	GLP	Kelly Irep (to (Cyprus) Paralimni, previously on loan at Bourg-en-Bresse)

=== Valenciennes ===
In:

No.	Pos.	Nation	Player
7	FW	CIV	Moussa Guel (from Lorient, previously on loan at Quevilly-Rouen)
10	MF	CMR	Arsène Elogo (from Grenoble)
15	DF	FRA	Éric Vandenabeele (from Grenoble)
18	FW	BEL	Baptiste Guillaume (from Angers, previously on loan)
22	FW	TUR	Metehan Güçlü (on loan from Rennes)
23	DF	FRA	Théo Pellenard (free agent from Angers)
27	MF	FRA	Mathis Picouleau (from Rennes B)

Out:

No.	Pos.	Nation	Player
3	DF	FRA	Lilian Brassier (loan return to Rennes)
6	MF	FRA	Gaëtan Arib (on loan to (Spain) Las Rozas)
7	FW	FRA	Steve Ambri (to Sochaux)
10	MF	FRA	Gauthier Hein (loan return to Metz)
15	DF	FRA	Chérif Quenum (to Bourges 18)
20	MF	FRA	Mahamé Siby (to Strasbourg)
27	DF	CMR	Frédéric Bong (on loan to Sporting Lyon)
—	GK	FRA	Damien Perquis (to Saint-Amand, previously on loan at (Netherlands) TOP Oss)
—	FW	FRA	Gwenn Foulon (to Saint-Malo, previously on loan at Bastia-Borgo)

=== Guingamp ===
In:

No.	Pos.	Nation	Player
1	GK	DEN	Nicolai Larsen (from (Denmark) Nordsjælland)
4	DF	BRA	Philipe Sampaio (from (Portugal) Tondela)
16	GK	FRA	Enzo Basilio (from Concarneau)
18	FW	CMR	Paul-Georges Ntep (free agent)
21	DF	BEL	Logan Ndenbe (from (Belgium) Oostende)
26	MF	TOG	Alaixys Romao (from Reims)
31	FW	FRA	Gaëtan Robail (on loan from Lens)

Out:

No.	Pos.	Nation	Player
1	GK	FRA	Théo Guivarch (to Rodez)
4	DF	FRA	Yohan Baret (on loan to Avranches)
16	GK	FRA	Marc-Aurèle Caillard (to Metz)
19	MF	FRA	Mehdi Merghem (on loan to Nancy)
24	DF	FRA	Gaëtan Bussmann (to (Germany) Erzgebirge Aue)
29	DF	FRA	Christophe Kerbrat (to Briochin)
35	DF	FRA	Steven Ako (to Bergerac)
36	MF	FRA	Mohamed Ali Gueddar (free agent)
—	DF	FRA	Yohan Bilingi (on loan to Concarneau, previously on loan at Bastia-Borgo)
—	MF	FRA	Mehdi Boudjemaa (on loan to Laval, previously on loan at Quevilly-Rouen)
—	FW	MTN	Souleymane Anne (to (Portugal) Tondela, previously at Guingamp B)

=== Grenoble ===
In:

No.	Pos.	Nation	Player
3	DF	NED	Bart Straalman (from Rodez)
4	MF	FRA	Manuel Perez (from Lens)
9	FW	TOG	David Henen (from (Belgium) Charleroi)
11	FW	CIV	Achille Anani (from Bourg-en-Bresse)
12	DF	FRA	Jordy Gaspar (from Monaco B)
16	GK	FRA	Paul Bourdelle (from Paris B)
17	DF	FRA	Loris Néry (from Nancy)
19	FW	SEN	Mamadou Diallo (from Créteil)
22	MF	FRA	Yoric Ravet (from (Germany) SC Freiburg)
26	MF	FRA	Kevin Tapoko (on loan from (Israel) Hapoel Be'er Sheva, previously on loan at (Israel) Hapoel Haifa)

Out:

No.	Pos.	Nation	Player
4	DF	FRA	Éric Vandenabeele (to Valenciennes)
9	FW	ISL	Kristófer Kristinsson (on loan to (Netherlands) Jong PSV)
16	GK	SEN	Papa Demba Camara (free agent)
17	MF	GUY	Terell Ondaan (on loan to (Netherlands) NEC)
19	MF	CGO	Yves Pambou (to (Romania) Gaz Metan Mediaș)
22	MF	CMR	Arsène Elogo (to Valenciennes)
24	MF	MTN	Ibréhima Coulibaly (to Le Mans)
26	DF	FRA	Jules Sylvestre-Brac (on loan to Villefranche)
27	FW	FRA	Florian Raspentino (to Bastia)
29	DF	FRA	Pierre Gibaud (to Le Havre)

=== Chambly ===
In:

No.	Pos.	Nation	Player
2	FW	FRA	Bastian Badu (loan extension from Montpellier)
3	DF	FRA	Aniss El Hriti (from (Luxembourg) Dudelange, previously on loan)
4	DF	FRA	Lucas Camelo (from MDA Foot)
14	DF	FRA	Bradley Danger (from Avranches)
17	MF	FRA	Cyril Zabou (from Bourges)
19	MF	FRA	Lorenzo Callegari (from Avranches)
21	FW	SRB	Nikola Petković (from (Serbia) Javor Ivanjica)
22	MF	SVN	Luka Šušnjara (from (Slovenia) Mura)
26	FW	MKD	Vlatko Stojanovski (on loan from Nîmes)
27	FW	FRA	Joris Correa (from Orléans, previously on loan)

Out:

No.	Pos.	Nation	Player
8	MF	FRA	Romain Padovani (to Quevilly-Rouen)
19	DF	FRA	Florian Pinteaux (to Beauvais)
20	FW	FRA	Benjamin Santelli (to Bastia)
21	DF	FRA	Judicaël Crillon (to (Luxembourg) Racing-Union)
26	MF	FRA	Laurent Héloïse (to AC Amiens)
27	DF	FRA	Diaranké Fofana (to Cholet)
34	MF	FRA	Jayson Papeau (loan return to Amiens)

=== Auxerre ===
In:

No.	Pos.	Nation	Player
4	DF	BRA	Jubal (from (Portugal) Vitória Setúbal)
7	MF	FRA	Gauthier Hein (from Metz, previously on loan at Valenciennes)
13	FW	MTQ	Kévin Fortuné (free agent)
15	DF	FRA	Alec Georgen (from Avranches)
16	GK	FRA	Donovan Léon (from Brest)
17	DF	FRA	Gautier Lloris (from Nice)
29	MF	FRA	Mathias Autret (from Brest)

Out:

No.	Pos.	Nation	Player
1	GK	FRA	Mathieu Michel (to Chamois Niortais)
4	MF	FRA	Mickaël Barreto (to Ajaccio)
7	FW	SRB	Dejan Sorgić (to (Switzerland) Luzern)
8	MF	BEN	Jordan Adéoti (free agent to (Norway) Sarpsborg)
11	FW	GUI	Mohamed Yattara (to (China) Sichuan Jiuniu)
15	MF	FRA	Eddy Sylvestre (loan return to Nice)
16	GK	FRA	Zacharie Boucher (to (Greece) Aris)
17	DF	COM	Benjaloud Youssouf (to Le Mans)
32	DF	FRA	Serge-Philippe Raux-Yao (to (Belgium) Cercle Brugge)

=== Nancy ===
In:

No.	Pos.	Nation	Player
7	FW	MTQ	Mickaël Biron (from Épinal)
14	MF	FRA	Mehdi Merghem (on loan from Guingamp)
27	DF	FRA	Rosario Latouchent (from Laval)
29	FW	FRA	Rayan Philippe (on loan from Dijon, previously on loan at Toulon)

Out:

No.	Pos.	Nation	Player
5	DF	FRA	Ryan Bidounga (free agent)
8	MF	FRA	Vincent Marchetti (to Ajaccio)
12	DF	FRA	Loris Néry (to Grenoble)
14	DF	NIG	Hervé Lybohy (to Orléans)
17	FW	FRA	Malaly Dembélé (to Rodez)
26	DF	FRA	Vincent Muratori (free agent)
27	FW	CPV	Vagner (loan return to Saint-Étienne)
29	FW	SEN	Makhtar Gueye (loan return to Saint-Étienne)

=== Caen ===
In:

No.	Pos.	Nation	Player
1	GK	FRA	Garissone Innocent (on loan from Paris Saint-Germain)
5	DF	RUS	Vladislav Molchan (from (Russia) Yenisey)
13	FW	FRA	Yoann Court (from Brest)
15	MF	FRA	Aliou Traoré (on loan from (England) Manchester United U23)
19	FW	FRA	Alexandre Mendy (from Bordeaux, previously on loan at Brest)
23	FW	FRA	Steve Shamal (from Boulogne)

Out:

No.	Pos.	Nation	Player
1	GK	FRA	Erwin Zelazny (free agent)
4	DF	SEN	Elhadji Pape Diaw (loan return to Angers)
10	FW	FRA	Jordan Tell (loan return to Rennes)
15	MF	SVN	Jan Repas (to (Slovenia) Maribor)
16	GK	FRA	Thomas Callens (to Lorient)
19	FW	FRA	Malik Tchokounté (to Dunkerque)
20	MF	CGO	Durel Avounou (to Le Mans)
23	FW	CGO	Herman Moussaki (on loan to Boulogne)
34	FW	FIN	Timo Stavitski (on loan to (Netherlands) MVV)
—	DF	COM	Younn Zahary (loan extension to Pau)
—	FW	FRA	Evens Joseph (loan extension to Boulogne)
—	GK	FRA	Marvin Golitin (on loan to Bobigny, previously on loan at Granville)
—	FW	FRA	Brice Tutu (on loan to Beauvais, previously on loan at Bastia)
—	DF	COD	Arnold Issoko (to (Portugal) Cova Piedade, previously on loan at (Portugal) Farense)
—	MF	FRA	Jad Mouaddib (free agent, previously on loan at Granville)

=== Sochaux ===
In:

No.	Pos.	Nation	Player
3	DF	GUI	Florentin Pogba (free agent)
4	DF	SEN	Abdallah Ndour (from Strasbourg)
5	DF	FRA	Johan Martial (from (Greece) Panetolikos)
7	MF	FRA	Bryan Soumaré (on loan from Dijon)
9	FW	COD	Yann Kitala (from Lyon B, previously on loan at Lorient)
14	FW	CIV	Chris Bedia (on loan from (Belgium) Charleroi, previously on loan at Troyes)
15	MF	SEN	Joseph Lopy (from Orléans)
17	FW	FRA	Steve Ambri (from Valenciennes)
27	FW	MLI	Adama Niane (from (Belgium) Charleroi, previously on loan at (Belgium) Oostende)

Out:

No.	Pos.	Nation	Player
3	DF	FRA	Nicolas Senzemba (to Sedan)
4	DF	CMR	Adolphe Teikeu (to (Turkey) Erzurumspor)
5	DF	FRA	Maxence Lacroix (to (Germany) VfL Wolfsburg)
7	MF	FRA	Sofiane Diop (loan return to Monaco)
9	FW	FRA	Sloan Privat (free agent)
12	FW	ENG	Tope Obadeyi (free agent)
13	DF	FRA	Christopher Rocchia (loan return to Marseille)
14	FW	CIV	Thomas Touré (loan return to Angers)
17	FW	SEN	Amadou Dia N'Diaye (loan return to Metz)
27	FW	SEN	Abdoulaye Sané (to (Saudi Arabia) Al-Taawoun)
29	MF	FRA	Jérémy Livolant (loan return to Guingamp)
31	FW	FRA	Victor Glaentzlin (to Le Mans)
33	MF	FRA	Melvin Sitti (loan return to (England) Norwich City)
—	MF	FRA	Isaak Umbdenstock (on loan to Bastia-Borgo, previously on loan at Belfort)
—	DF	FRA	Rayan Senhadji (to (Bulgaria) Montana, previously on loan at Béziers)
—	MF	FRA	Martin François (to Louhans-Cuiseaux, previously on loan at Villefranche)

=== Châteauroux ===
In:

No.	Pos.	Nation	Player
2	DF	CIV	Ibrahim Cissé (on loan from Nice, previously on loan at (Portugal) Famalicão)
6	DF	FRA	Leandro Morante (from Béziers)
7	MF	FRA	Amir Nouri (from (Belgium) Roeselare)

Out:

No.	Pos.	Nation	Player
5	DF	GUI	Sékou Condé (free agent to (Romania) Politehnica Iași)
8	MF	FRA	Valentin Vanbaleghem (free agent to (Italy) Perugia)
9	FW	MLI	Cheick Fantamady Diarra (to Dunkerque)
23	FW	FRA	Haissem Hassan (to (Spain) Villarreal B)
26	MF	HAI	Brian Chevreuil (to Bourges 18)
—	FW	FRA	Andrew Jung (on loan to Quevilly-Rouen, previously on loan at Concarneau)
—	MF	SEN	Fallou Niang (free agent, previously on loan at Le Puy)

=== Rodez ===
In:

No.	Pos.	Nation	Player
1	GK	FRA	Théo Guivarch (from Guingamp)
6	MF	FRA	Rémy Boissier (from Le Mans, previously on loan)
9	FW	FRA	Malaly Dembélé (from Nancy)
18	MF	FRA	Jordan Leborgne (from Guingamp B)
20	FW	FRA	Alan Kerouedan (from Rennes B)
23	DF	GAB	Johann Obiang (from Le Puy)
27	FW	SEN	Daouda Gueye (from Bourges)
—	MF	FRA	Julien Ponceau (on loan from Lorient)

Out:

No.	Pos.	Nation	Player
1	GK	FRA	Arthur Desmas (to Clermont)
3	DF	NED	Bart Straalman (to Grenoble)
9	FW	FRA	Dorian Caddy (to Laval)
18	FW	FRA	Edwin Maanane (to Concarneau)
20	MF	FRA	Mathieu Guerbert (to Gazélec)
25	DF	FRA	Corentin Jacob (on loan to Sporting Lyon)
27	MF	FRA	Erwan Maury (to Concarneau)

=== Paris ===
In:

No.	Pos.	Nation	Player
5	MF	SEN	Moustapha Name (from Pau)
6	MF	FRA	Saïd Arab (from Red Star)
7	FW	FRA	Gaëtan Laura (from Quevilly-Rouen)
13	DF	FRA	Gaëtan Belaud (from Brest)
17	DF	FRA	Hugo Gambor (from Orléans B)
18	DF	SEN	Youssoupha N'Diaye (from Sporting Lyon)
21	MF	FRA	Morgan Guilavogui (from Toulon)
22	FW	FRA	Warren Caddy (from Sète)
23	MF	FRA	Marvin Gakpa (from Metz)
25	FW	FRA	Andy Pembélé (from Lille B)
26	MF	CMR	Franck Ellé Essouma (from Le Havre B)
27	DF	FRA	Thibault Campanini (from Gazélec)
29	DF	FRA	Florent Hanin (from (Portugal) Vitória Guimarães)

Out:

No.	Pos.	Nation	Player
5	DF	FRA	Jean Hugonet (to Saint-Malo)
6	MF	FRA	Sami Matoug (free agent)
7	FW	FRA	Jérémy Ménez (to (Italy) Reggina)
9	FW	FRA	Romain Armand (to Pau)
13	MF	GHA	Mohammed Rabiu (to (Russia) Tambov)
17	DF	CIV	Samuel Yohou (to (Turkey) Tuzlaspor)
18	MF	CMR	Marco Essimi (to Saint-Malo)
22	DF	GHA	Ernest Boahene (loan return to (Ghana) Rainbow Kumasi)
23	DF	BRA	Felipe Saad (retired)
24	MF	CIV	Cheick Timité (loan return to Amiens)
25	DF	FRA	Thomas Garcia (free agent)
26	FW	GUI	Mohamed Mara (loan return to Lorient)
28	MF	FRA	Vincent Koziello (loan return to (Germany) 1.FC Köln)
29	FW	SEN	Adama Sarr (to (Turkey) Tuzlaspor)
32	DF	BFA	Yacouba Coulibaly (loan return to Le Havre)
38	DF	FRA	Ibrahim Cissé (loan return to Angers)
—	FW	FRA	Richard Sila (on loan to Concarneau, previously on loan at Andrézieux)
—	GK	GLP	Christopher Dilo (free agent, previously on loan at Cholet)
—	MF	FRA	Jérémy Mangonzo (to Fleury 91, previously on loan)
—	MF	HAI	Bryan Alceus (to (Romania) Gaz Metan Mediaș, previously on loan at Bastia Borgo)
—	FW	FRA	Keelan Lebon (free agent to (Bulgaria) Beroe, previously on loan at Créteil)

=== Chamois Niortais ===
In:

No.	Pos.	Nation	Player
1	GK	FRA	Mathieu Michel (from Auxerre)
11	FW	SEN	Pape Ibnou Bâ (from Athlético Marseille)
12	FW	GNB	Joseph Mendes (from Ajaccio)
21	DF	FRA	Lenny Vallier (from Reims B)
25	MF	FRA	Bilal Boutobba (from Montpellier)
29	DF	FRA	Joris Moutachy (from Romorantin)
30	GK	FRA	Quentin Braat (from Nantes, previously on loan)

Out:

No.	Pos.	Nation	Player
1	GK	BEN	Saturnin Allagbé (to Dijon)
3	DF	FRA	Florian Lapis (to Orléans)
5	DF	FRA	Matthieu Sans (to Annecy)
11	FW	BRA	Pedro Henrique (free agent)
12	MF	FRA	Antoine Leautey (to (Portugal) Gil Vicente)
14	DF	FRA	Thibaut Vion (to (Bulgaria) CSKA Sofia)
16	GK	FRA	Enzo Pauchet (to Poitevin)
21	FW	CIV	Zoumana Koné (to Haguenau)
23	DF	FRA	Julien Dacosta (to (England) Coventry City)
—	DF	FRA	Dylan Fontani (to Hyères, previously on loan)

=== Pau ===
In:

No.	Pos.	Nation	Player
1	GK	FRA	Alexandre Olliero (on loan from Nantes)
3	DF	FRA	Scotty Sadzoute (loan extension from Lille B)
4	MF	CIV	Xavier Kouassi (from (Switzerland) Neuchâtel Xamax)
7	DF	CIV	Erwin Koffi (from (Cyprus) Olympiakos Nicosia)
8	MF	FRA	Victor Lobry (from Avranches)
9	FW	FRA	Romain Armand (from Paris)
11	FW	SEN	Cheikh Sabaly (loan extension from Metz)
18	FW	GHA	Ebenezer Assifuah (from Le Havre)
19	MF	SEN	Mamadou Diatta (from (Senegal) Cayor, previously on loan at (Belgium) Club NXT)
23	DF	FRA	Anthony Scaramozzino (from Boulogne)
24	DF	COM	Younn Zahary (loan extension from Caen)
26	DF	FRA	Mamadou Kamissoko (from Lorient, previously on loan)
28	FW	SEN	Thierno Thioub (from (Russia) Spartak 2)
40	GK	FRA	Patrick Trindade (from Guingamp youth)

Out:

No.	Pos.	Nation	Player
1	GK	FRA	Alexis Guendouz (loan return to Saint-Étienne)
4	DF	MLI	Alassane Diaby (to Quevilly-Rouen)
5	MF	SEN	Moustapha Name (to Paris)
7	FW	SEN	Lamine Gueye (loan return to (Senegal) Génération Foot)
23	MF	MAR	Fawzi Ouaamar (to Jura Dolois)
24	DF	FRA	Paul Clément (to Évreux)

=== Dunkerque ===
In:

No.	Pos.	Nation	Player
1	GK	FRA	Jérémy Vachoux (from Orléans)
9	FW	FRA	Kévin Rocheteau (from Cholet)
11	FW	FRA	Billy Ketkeophomphone (from Cholet)
12	DF	FRA	Ibrahim Cissé (from Angers, previously on loan at Paris)
15	DF	FRA	Alioune Ba (from Orléans)
17	DF	FRA	Harouna Sy (from (Belgium) Roeselare)
18	FW	FRA	Malik Tchokounté (from Caen)
19	MF	HAI	Leverton Pierre (from Metz, previously on loan)
20	MF	FRA	Ilan Kebbal (on loan from Reims, previously on loan at Sporting Club Lyon)
24	MF	FRA	Redouane Kerrouche (from Le Puy)
27	DF	FRA	Adon Gomis (from Laval)
29	FW	MLI	Cheick Fantamady Diarra (from Châteauroux)

Out:

No.	Pos.	Nation	Player
9	FW	FRA	Nathan Bizet (to Red Star)
11	MF	FRA	Iron Gomis (loan return to Amiens)
12	DF	GAB	Wilfried Ebane (loan return to Lorient)
17	MF	FRA	Ludovic Gamboa (to Gazélec)
21	MF	FRA	Rayane Chayebi (to Marignane Gignac)
24	DF	FRA	Alexandre Lauray (loan return to Bordeaux)
26	DF	FRA	Alexis Calant (to (Belgium) La Louvière)
27	FW	FRA	Mohamed Bayo (loan return to Clermont)
—	MF	FRA	Nassim Senaici (to (Belgium) Francs Borains)

== See also ==
- 2020–21 Ligue 1
- 2020–21 Ligue 2
