= Umbdenstock =

Umbdenstock is a surname. Notable people with the surname include:

- Gustave Umbdenstock (1866–1940), French architect
- Isaak Umbdenstock (born 1999), French footballer
