= Tissot (disambiguation) =

Tissot is a Swiss watchmaking firm founded in 1853.

Tissot may also refer to:

== Miscellaneous ==
- Tissot's indicatrix, method of comparing map projections devised by Nicolas Auguste Tissot
- Mathey-Tissot, Swiss watchmaking firm founded in 1886
- "tissot" is the codename of the Xiaomi Mi A1 smartphone (some refer it as "tissot_sprout")

== People ==
- Alice Tissot (1890–1971), French actress
- Arnold Robert-Tissot (1846–1925), Swiss politician
- Camille Tissot (1868–1917), French naval officer and pioneer of wireless telegraphy
- Charles Revol-Tissot (1892–1971), French World War I flying ace
- Charles-Joseph Tissot (1828-1884), French diplomat and archaeologist
- Clément Joseph Tissot (1747–1826), French physician and physiotherapist
- Émilie Tissot (born 1993), French race walker
- Ernest E. Tissot Jr. (1927–2019), American rear admiral and naval aviator
- Fabien Tissot (born 1972), French football manager and player
- François-Noël Babeuf (1760–1797) French political agitator who adopted the pseudonym "Tissot"
- Fred Tissot (born 1995), Tahitian footballer
- James Tissot (1836–1902), French painter
- Janou Tissot (born 1945), French equestrian show jumper, née Lefèbvre
- Justin Tissot, Swiss weightlifter
- Marie Adèle Pierre Jules Tissot (1838–1883), French mining engineer
- Maxim Tissot (born 1992), Canadian soccer player
- Nicolas Auguste Tissot (1824–1897), French cartographer
- Pierre François Tissot (1768–1854), French man of letters and politician
- Randy Tissot (1944–2013), American stock car racing driver
- Raymond Tissot (1919–1985), French javelin thrower
- Samuel-Auguste Tissot (1728–1797), Swiss physician
- Stéphane Tissot (born 1979), French alpine skier
- Sylvie Tissot (born 1971), French sociologist, activist and documentary filmmaker
