= Sami Matoug =

French footballer (born 1999)

Personal information
- Full name: Sami Matoug
- Date of birth: 12 November 1999 (age 26)
- Place of birth: Versailles, France
- Height: 1.79 m (5 ft 10 in)
- Position: Midfielder

Team information
- Current team: US Ivry
- Number: 8

Youth career
- 2010–2011: AO Buc Football
- 2011–2013: Saint-Cyr
- 2013–2016: Guyancourt
- 2016–2017: Versailles

Senior career*
Years	Team	Apps	(Gls)
2017–2018	Versailles	10	(1)
2018–2019	Les Mureaux	7	(1)
2019–2020	Paris FC B	8	(0)
2020	Paris FC	1	(0)
2021–2023	St Maur Lusitanos	15	(0)
2023–	US Ivry	9	(0)
- * Club domestic league appearances and goals as of 19:56, 21 July 2024 (UTC)

Sami Matoug (born 12 November 1999) is a French professional footballer who plays as a midfielder for US Ivry.

== Career ==
On 11 July 2019, Matoug signed his first professional contract with Paris FC. He made his professional debut with Paris FC in a 1–1 Ligue 2 tie with Sochaux on 10 January 2020.
