= Thomas Garcia =

French footballer (born 1994)

Personal information
- Full name: Thomas Jorge Garcia Seyfried
- Date of birth: 25 October 1994 (age 32)
- Place of birth: Bagnols-sur-Cèze, France
- Position: Right-back

Youth career
- 2003–2012: Bagnols Pont

Senior career*
Years	Team	Apps	(Gls)
2012–2018	Bagnols Pont		
2018–2019	Pedras Rubras	21	(3)
2019–2020	Paris FC	3	(0)
- * Club domestic league appearances and goals as of 00:15, 10 February 2021 (UTC)

Thomas Jorge Garcia Seyfried (born 25 October 1994), known as Thomas Garcia, is a French professional footballer who plays as a right-back.

== Career ==
A youth product of FC Bagnols Pont since the age of nine, Garcia signed a professional contract with Paris FC on 23 July 2019, after a successful debut season with Portuguese club Pedras Rubras. He made his professional debut in a 3–0 Ligue 2 loss to FC Lorient on 29 July 2019.
