= Victor Glaentzlin =

French footballer (born 1998)

Personal information
- Date of birth: 23 April 1998 (age 28)
- Place of birth: Guebwiller, France
- Height: 1.85 m (6 ft 1 in)
- Position: Centre-forward

Team information
- Current team: Épinal
- Number: 26

Youth career
- Sochaux

Senior career*
Years	Team	Apps	(Gls)
2016–2019	Sochaux II	52	(22)
2018–2020	Sochaux	6	(1)
2020–2022	Le Mans	19	(1)
2020–2022	Le Mans II	2	(0)
2022	Créteil	2	(0)
2022	Créteil II	1	(0)
2022–2023	Nancy	0	(0)
2022–2023	Nancy II	7	(3)
2023–2024	Andrézieux	3	(0)
2025–2026	Mulhouse	7	(3)
2026–	Épinal	1	(1)
- * Club domestic league appearances and goals as of 7 February 2026

Victor Glaentzlin (born 23 April 1998) is a French professional footballer who plays as a centre-forward for Championnat National 1 club Épinal.

== Career ==
Glaentzlin's career began with Sochaux. He firstly featured for the club's reserve team, making his debut on 28 May 2016 in a home defeat to Jura Sud. In total, he made nine appearances without scoring in 2015–16 and 2016–17. In his third campaign, 2017–18, Glaentzlin netted twelve goals in twenty fixtures; including his career first versus Selongey on 19 August 2017. In July 2018, Glaentzlin was promoted into Sochaux's first-team squad after being an unused substitute for their 2018–19 Ligue 2 opener against Grenoble, signing a three-year contract. A week later, on 3 August 2018, Glaentzlin made his first-team debut during a defeat to Valenciennes.

In June 2020, Glaentzlin agreed the termination of his Sochaux contract and signed for Le Mans.

In January 2022, Glaentzlin has his contract terminated and joined Créteil.

After a trial, Glaentzlin signed with Nancy on 19 October 2022.

== Career statistics ==
As of 21 January 2022

Appearances and goals by club, season and competition
Club	Season	League			National cup		League cup		Continental		Other		Total	
Club	Season	Division	Apps	Goals	Apps	Goals	Apps	Goals	Apps	Goals	Apps	Goals	Apps	Goals
Sochaux II	2015–16	CFA	2	0	—		—		—		0	0	2	0
Sochaux II	2016–17	CFA 2	7	0	—		—		—		0	0	7	0
Sochaux II	2017–18	National 3	20	12	—		—		—		0	0	20	12
Sochaux II	2018–19	National 3	15	9	—		—		—		0	0	15	9
Sochaux II	2019–20	National 3	5	1	—		—		—		0	0	5	1
Sochaux II	Total		49	22	—		—		—		0	0	49	22
Sochaux	2018–19	Ligue 2	1	0	1	0	0	0	—		0	0	2	0
Sochaux	2019–20	Ligue 2	5	1	1	0	1	0	—		0	0	7	1
Sochaux	Total		6	1	2	0	1	0	—		0	0	9	1
Le Mans	2020–21	National	9	0	0	0	0	0	—		0	0	9	0
Le Mans	2021–22	National	10	1	1	0	0	0	—		0	0	11	1
Le Mans	Total		19	1	1	0	0	0	0	0	0	0	20	1
Le Mans II	2020–21	National 3	1	0	—		—		—		0	0	1	0
Le Mans II	2021–22	National 3	1	0	—		—		—		0	0	1	0
Le Mans II	Total		2	0	0	0	0	0	0	0	0	0	2	0
Career total			76	24	3	0	1	0	—		0	0	80	24
