= Wilfried Ebane =

Gabonese footballer

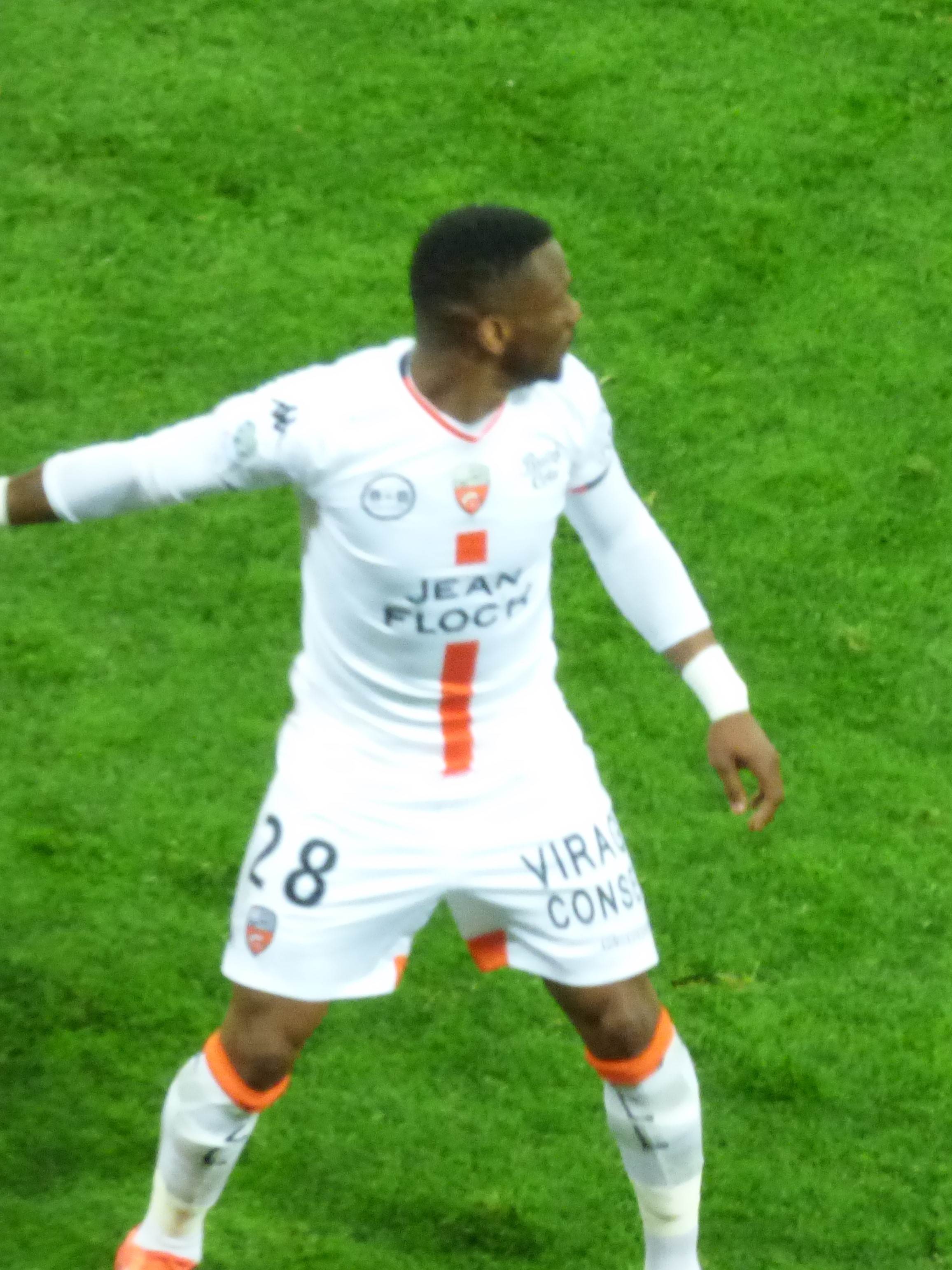
- Ebane in 2019

Personal information
- Full name: Wilfried Ebane Abessolo
- Date of birth: 26 April 1992 (age 34)
- Place of birth: Libreville, Gabon
- Height: 1.72 m (5 ft 8 in)
- Position: Left-back

Team information
- Current team: Saint-Colomban Locminé
- Number: 3

Senior career*
Years	Team	Apps	(Gls)
- Akanda FC
2016–2017	Changé	1	(0)
2017–2018	Saint-Colomban Locminé	25	(1)
2018–2019	Lorient II	14	(0)
2018–2021	Lorient	1	(0)
2019–2020	→ Dunkerque (loan)	11	(0)
2021–2022	Vannes	5	(0)
2022–2023	Reims Sainte-Anne	8	(0)
2023–	Saint-Colomban Locminé	26	(1)

International career^{‡}
2015–	Gabon	14	(0)
- * Club domestic league appearances and goals as of 11:55, 13 June 2024 (UTC) ‡ National team caps and goals as of 11:55, 13 June 2024 (UTC)

Wilfried Ebane Abessolo (born 26 April 1992) is a Gabonese professional footballer who plays as a left-back for Championnat National 3 club Saint-Colomban Locminé and the Gabon national team.

== Club career ==
Ebane began his footballing career with Akanda FC in Gabon, and moved to the lower divisions of France before transferring to FC Lorient on 2018. Ebane made his professional debut with Lorient in a 1–0 Coupe de la Ligue win over Valenciennes FC on 14 August 2018. In August 2019 he was loaned to USL Dunkerque until the end of the 2019–20 season.

== International career ==
Ebane represented the Gabon national team for 2016 African Nations Championship qualification.
