= Mamadou Kamissoko =

French footballer (born 1993)

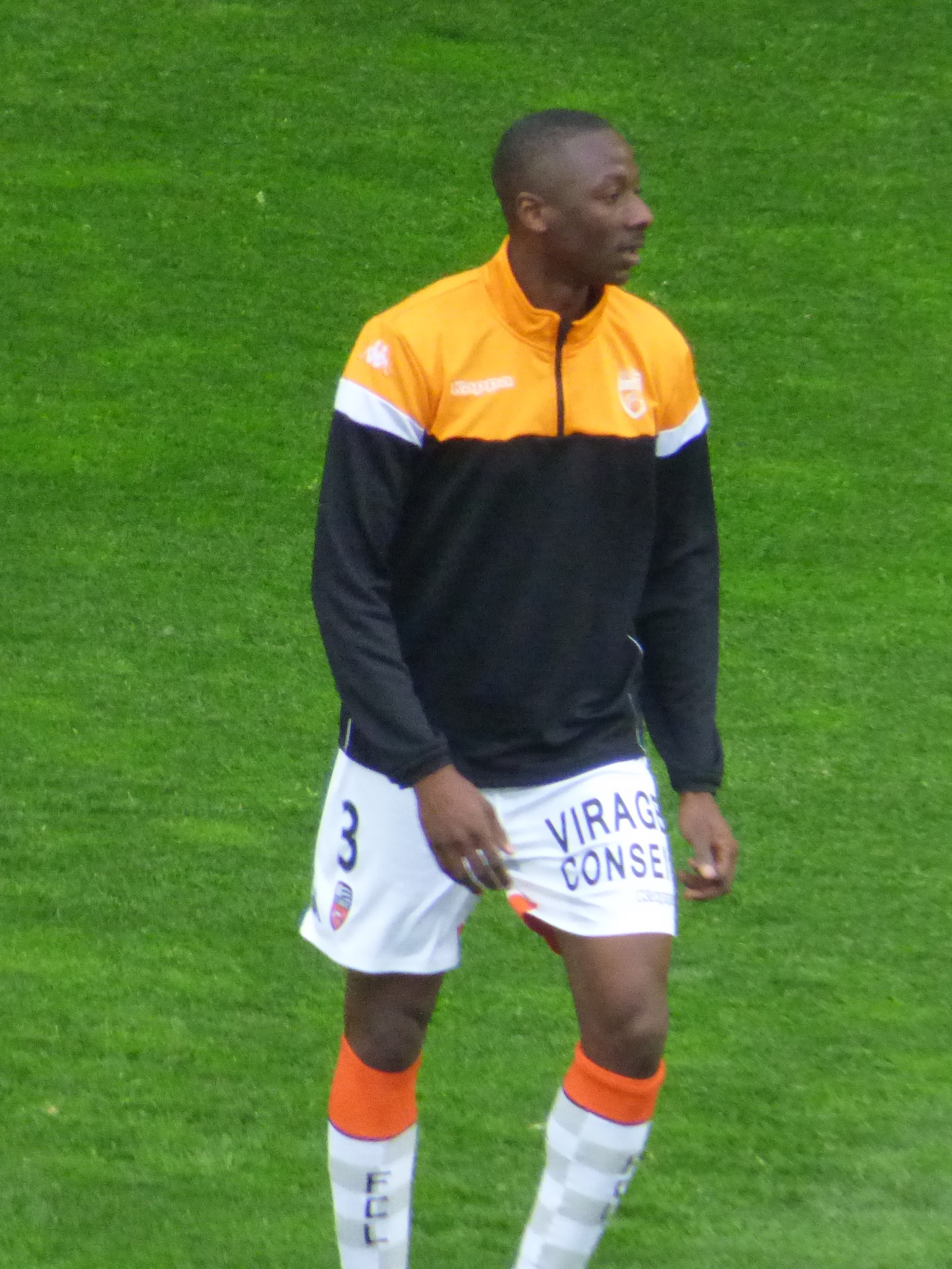
- Kamissoko in 2019

Personal information
- Date of birth: 15 April 1993 (age 33)
- Place of birth: Le Blanc-Mesnil, France
- Height: 1.88 m (6 ft 2 in)
- Position: Defender

Team information
- Current team: Angoulême Charente
- Number: 27

Youth career
- 2003–2008: Drancy
- 2008–2012: Bordeaux

Senior career*
Years	Team	Apps	(Gls)
2012–2013	Bordeaux II	28	(1)
2013–2014	Red Star	1	(0)
2014–2017	Bergerac	76	(3)
2017–2020	Lorient II	25	(3)
2018–2020	Lorient	7	(1)
2018	→ Concarneau (loan)	11	(1)
2019–2020	→ Pau FC (loan)	22	(0)
2020	Pau FC	8	(0)
2021	Nea Salamina	20	(2)
2021–2022	Boulogne	7	(0)
2021–2022	Boulogne II	6	(0)
2022–2024	Bergerac	53	(0)
2024–2025	Cannes	10	(0)
2025–	Angoulême Charente	11	(1)
- * Club domestic league appearances and goals as of 4 December 2025

Mamadou Kamissoko (born 15 April 1993) is a French professional footballer who plays as a defender for Championnat National 1 club Angoulême Charente.

== Club career ==
A youth product of Bordeaux's youth academy, Kamissoko began his footballing career in the lower divisions of France before joining FC Lorient on 9 June 2017. He made his professional debut with Lorient in a 1–0 Coupe de la Ligue win over Valenciennes FC on 14 August 2018.

He spent the early part of 2021 in the Cypriot league with Nea Salamina. In late November 2021, he returned to France and signed with Boulogne in Championnat National.

== Personal life ==
Kamissoko was born in Le-Blanc-Mesnil, France and has French nationality. He is of Malian descent.
