= Fabien Tissot =

French footballer (born 1972)

Personal information
- Date of birth: 14 November 1972 (age 53)
- Place of birth: Nancy, France
- Height: 1.77 m (5 ft 10 in)
- Position: Forward

Senior career*
Years	Team	Apps	(Gls)
1990–1994	Nancy		
1994–1996	Épinal		
1996–1998	Beauvais	60	(12)
1998–2000	Reims	15	(3)
2000–2005	Saint-Dizier		

Managerial career
- 2003–2009: Saint-Dizier
- 2009–2015: Épinal
- 2016: Progrès Niederkorn
- 2017–2020: Bourgoin-Jallieu
- 2022–2024: Épinal
- * Club domestic league appearances and goals

Fabien Tissot (French: [fabjɛ̃ tiso]; born 14 November 1972) is a French football manager and former player who most recently managed SAS Épinal.

A forward, Tissot made over 100 appearances in Ligue 2 for Nancy, Beauvais and Épinal. He assisted Saint-Dizier for seven seasons between 2002 and 2009, and was the club's player-manager in the 2008–09 campaign. He has since gone on to manage Épinal, Progrès Niederkorn and Bourgoin-Jallieu.
