= SAS Épinal =

Association football club in France

- Full name: Stade Athlétique Spinalien Épinal
- Founded: 1941; 85 years ago
- Ground: Stade de la Colombière
- Capacity: 8,000
- Chairman: Yves Bailly
- Head coach: Fabien Tissot
- League: National 2 Group B
- 2024–25: National 2 Group C, 11th of 16
- Website: www.sasfootball.com
Home colours	Away colours

Stade Athletique Spinalien Épinal is a French football club based in the commune of Épinal. They currently play in Championnat National 1, the fourth tier of French football. Their kit colours are yellow and blue. They play their home matches at the Stade de la Colombière in Épinal.

== History ==
The club was founded in 1941 after the merge of two former teams, Stade Saint Michel and L'Athletique Club Spinalien and have never played in a higher division than Ligue 2.

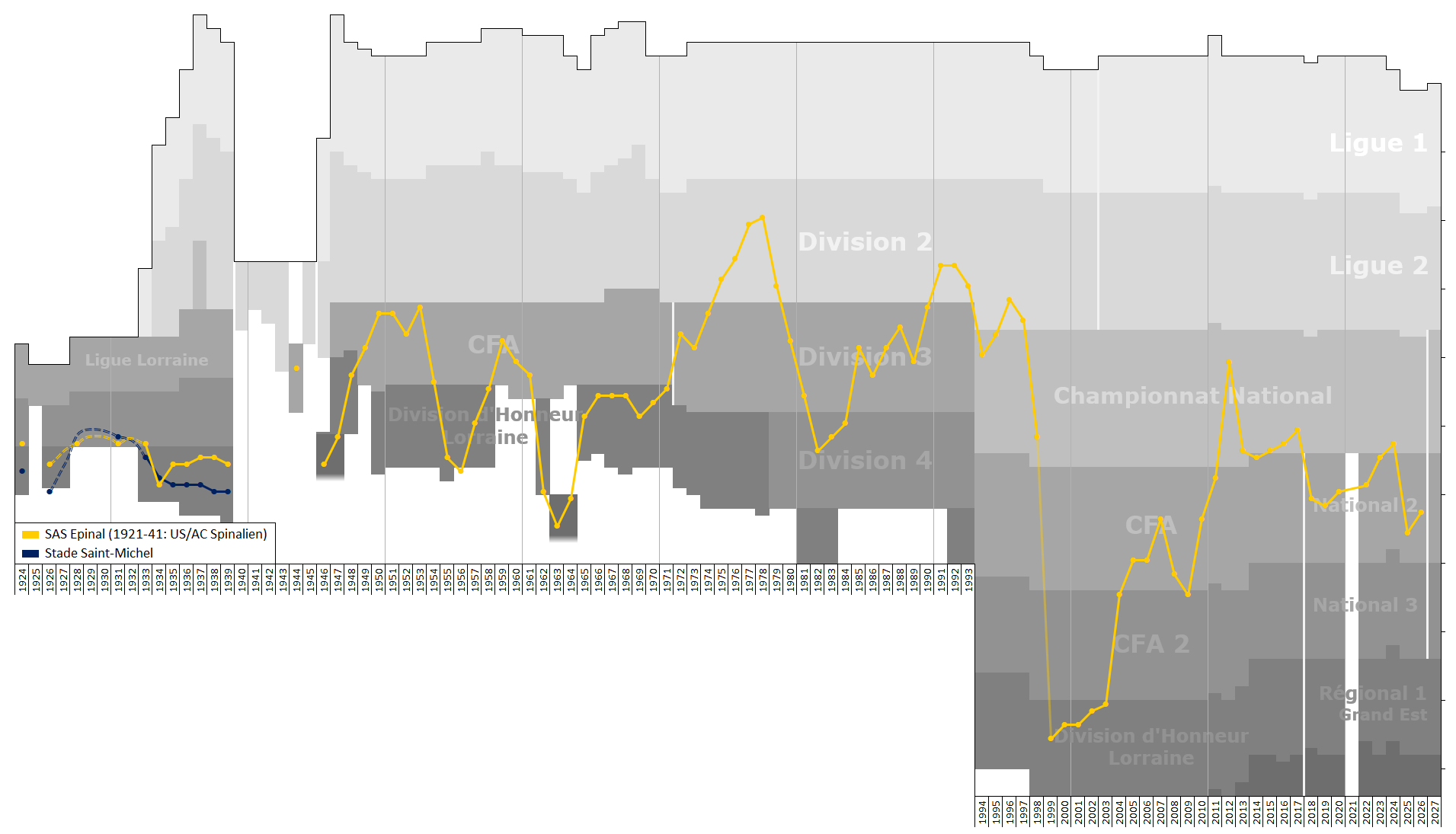
Historical league performance chart of SAS Épinal

In 2022–23, SAS Épinal secure promotion to Championnat National from 2023–24 and champions of Championnat National 2 Group B in 2022–23, the club return to third tier after seven years absence.

== Crest ==
Former crest from 2011 to 2021

== Honours ==
- Championnat National 2
  - Winners (2): 2013–14, 2022–23
- DH Lorraine Group
  - Winners (1): 1998

== Current squad ==
As of 10 April 2026

Note: Flags indicate national team as defined under FIFA eligibility rules; some limited exceptions apply. Players may hold more than one non-FIFA nationality.

No.	Pos.	Nation	Player
2	DF	FRA	Bastien Launay
4	DF	FRA	Paul Léonard
5	DF	FRA	Maka Gakou
6	MF	FRA	Nicolas Delpech
7	FW	FRA	Valdir Fonseca
8	MF	FRA	Jérémy Colin
9	FW	FRA	Darell Tokpa
10	MF	TUN	Issam Ben Khémis
11	FW	FRA	Karim Coulibaly
12	DF	FRA	Yanis El Madi
13	DF	FRA	Thomas Berenguier
14	FW	COM	Adel Mahamoud
15	DF	FRA	Isaak Umbdenstock
17	MF	HAI	Fredler Christophe

No.	Pos.	Nation	Player
18	DF	FRA	Marvyn Vialaneix
19	FW	FRA	Alexandre Fressange
20	MF	FRA	Abdoulaye Niang
21	MF	FRA	Angel Benard
22	MF	FRA	Naïm Bouresas
23	DF	FRA	Maxence Verquin
24	DF	FRA	Gaëtan Bussmann (captain)
26	FW	FRA	Victor Glaentzlin
29	FW	FRA	Gil Lawson
30	GK	FRA	Léo Hatier
31	DF	MTN	Oumar Amadou
33	DF	FRA	Milan Corvino
38	MF	FRA	Mathis Toraman
40	GK	FRA	Thomas Roche

== Notable players ==
- (France) Esteban Lepaul
- (France) Jimmy Algerino
