= Isaak Umbdenstock =

French footballer (born 1999)

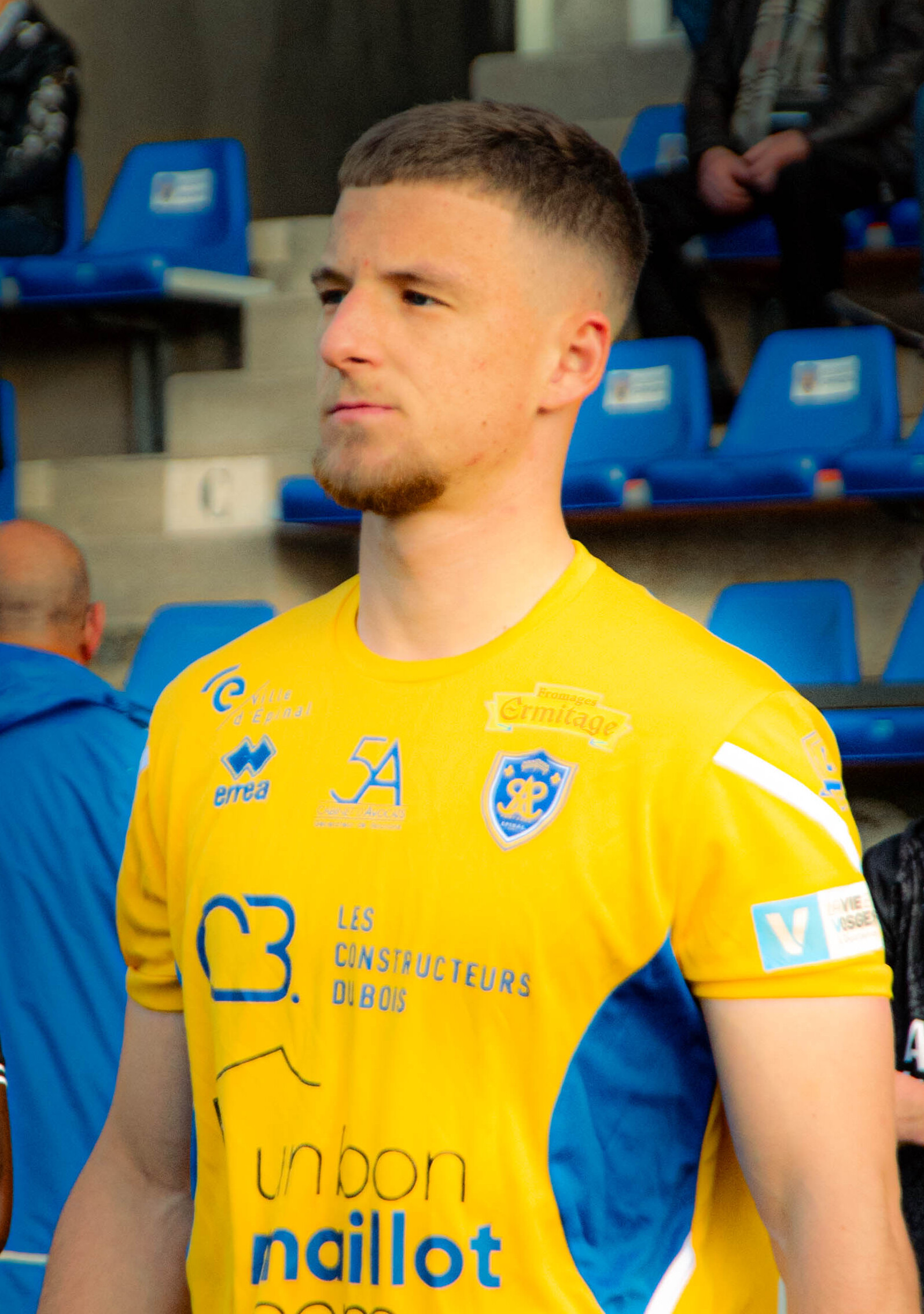
- Umbdenstock in 2024

Personal information
- Date of birth: 18 February 1999 (age 27)
- Place of birth: Colmar, France
- Height: 1.78 m (5 ft 10 in)
- Positions: Defensive midfielder; left-back

Youth career
- 2010–2013: Colmar
- 2013–2014: Nancy
- 2014–2018: Sochaux

Senior career*
Years	Team	Apps	(Gls)
2017–2021	Sochaux B	42	(3)
2019–2021	Sochaux	1	(0)
2020	→ Belfort (loan)	5	(0)
2020–2021	→ Bastia-Borgo (loan)	27	(1)
2021–2022	Chambly	26	(1)
2022–2023	Nancy B	6	(0)
2022–2023	Nancy	17	(0)
2023–2024	Épinal	31	(1)
2024–2025	Châteauroux	23	(0)
- * Club domestic league appearances and goals as of 26 May 2025

Isaak Umbdenstock (born 18 February 1999) is a French professional footballer who plays as a defensive midfielder or left-back.

== Club career ==
Umbdenstock began his footballing career in the youth academy of Colmar as a leftback, and made the move to Sochaux in 2014. On 15 November 2018, he signed his first professional contract with Sochaux, for a length of three seasons.

Umbdenstock made his professional debut for Sochaux in a 0–0 Ligue 2 tie with Troyes on 15 March 2019.

Umbdenstock joined Championnat National 2 side Belfort for a loan spell in January 2020, returning at the end of the season. He commenced a second loan spell, with Championnat National side Bastia-Borgo, in July 2020.

In July 2021, he signed with Chambly in Championnat National.

On 28 June 2022, Umbdenstock signed a two-year contract with Nancy, returning to the club where he played as a junior.
