= 2017–18 Dijon FCO season =

Dijon
2017–18 season
- Chairman: Olivier Delcourt
- Manager: Olivier Dall'Oglio
- Stadium: Stade Gaston Gérard
- Ligue 1: 11th
- Coupe de France: Round of 64
- Coupe de la Ligue: Third round
- Top goalscorer: League: Júlio Tavares (12); All: Júlio Tavares (13)
Home colours	Away colours

The 2017–18 Dijon FCO season was the 19th professional season of the club since its creation in 1998.

== Players ==
Note: Flags indicate national team as defined under FIFA eligibility rules; some limited exceptions apply. Players may hold more than one non-FIFA nationality.

No.	Pos.	Nation	Player
1	GK	FRA	Benjamin Leroy
2	DF	HUN	Ádám Lang
3	MF	FRA	Anthony Belmonte
5	DF	TUN	Oussama Haddadi
6	DF	NCL	Wesley Lautoa
7	MF	FRA	Frédéric Sammaritano
8	MF	ALG	Mehdi Abeid
9	FW	FRA	Wesley Saïd
11	FW	CPV	Júlio Tavares
13	MF	TUN	Naïm Sliti (on loan from Lille)
14	MF	FRA	Jordan Marié
15	MF	FRA	Florent Balmont
16	GK	FRA	Bobby Allain
18	DF	CTA	Cédric Yambéré

No.	Pos.	Nation	Player
19	DF	FRA	Valentin Rosier
20	MF	FRA	Romain Amalfitano
21	MF	FRA	Eden Massouema
22	MF	KOR	Kwon Chang-hoon
23	DF	SUI	Vincent Rüfli
24	MF	CGO	Dylan Bahamboula
25	DF	CGO	Arnold Bouka Moutou
26	DF	MAR	Fouad Chafik
27	DF	FRA	Cédric Varrault (captain)
29	FW	FRA	Benjamin Jeannot
30	GK	FRA	Baptiste Reynet
—	MF	FRA	Erwan Maury
—	MF	FRA	Jessy Bénet
—	FW	SEN	Mamadou Thiam

=== Out on loan ===
Note: Flags indicate national team as defined under FIFA eligibility rules; some limited exceptions apply. Players may hold more than one non-FIFA nationality.

No.	Pos.	Nation	Player
—	GK	FRA	Enzo Basilio (on loan to Rodez until 30 June 2018)
—	MF	FRA	Guillaume Sarrabayrouse (on loan to Colomiers until 30 June 2018)

No.	Pos.	Nation	Player
—	FW	FRA	Charly Dutournier (on loan to Avranches until 30 June 2018)

== Competitions ==
=== Ligue 1 ===
==== League table ====
Pos	Team	Pld	W	D	L	GF	GA	GD	Pts
9	Nantes	38	14	10	14	36	41	−5	52
10	Montpellier	38	11	18	9	36	33	+3	51
11	Dijon	38	13	9	16	55	73	−18	48
12	Guingamp	38	12	11	15	48	59	−11	47
13	Amiens	38	12	9	17	37	42	−5	45

Source: Ligue 1 and Soccerway
Rules for classification: 1) Points; 2) Goal difference; 3) Head-to-head points; 4) Head-to-head goal difference; 5) Head-to-head goals scored; 6) Head-to-head away goals; 7) Goals scored; 8) Away goals scored; 9) Most goals scored in one league match; 10) Fair-play points

==== Results summary ====
Overall								Home						Away					
Pld	W	D	L	GF	GA	GD	Pts	W	D	L	GF	GA	GD	W	D	L	GF	GA	GD
38	13	9	16	55	73	−18	48	11	3	5	35	28	+7	2	6	11	20	45	−25

Last updated: 20 May 2017.

==== Results by round ====
Round	1	2	3	4	5	6	7	8	9	10	11	12	13	14	15	16	17	18	19	20	21	22	23	24	25	26	27	28	29	30	31	32	33	34	35	36	37	38
Ground	A	H	A	H	A	H	A	H	H	A	H	A	H	H	A	H	A	H	A	H	A	A	H	A	H	A	H	A	H	A	H	A	A	H	A	H	A	H
Result	L	L	D	W	L	L	D	D	L	W	W	L	W	W	L	W	L	W	L	D	L	L	W	D	W	L	W	D	D	D	L	W	D	L	L	W	L	W
Position	18	20	18	16	19	18	17	17	19	18	14	16	13	12	12	10	13	9	10	9	11	14	11	13	12	13	11	10	10	10	11	11	12	12	12	12	13	11

A = Away; H = Home; W = Win; D = Draw; L = Loss

== Statistics ==
=== Appearances and goals ===
No.	Pos	Nat	Player	Total		Ligue 1		Coupe de France		Coupe de la Ligue	
No.	Pos	Nat	Player	Apps	Goals	Apps	Goals	Apps	Goals	Apps	Goals
Goalkeepers
1	GK	(France) FRA	Benjamin Leroy	2	0	0	0	1	0	1	0
16	GK	(France) FRA	Bobby Allain	0	0	0	0	0	0	0	0
30	GK	(France) FRA	Baptiste Reynet	38	0	38	0	0	0	0	0
Defenders
3	DF	(Republic of the Congo) CGO	Arnold Bouka Moutou	7	0	3+3	0	0	0	1	0
4	DF	(Senegal) SEN	Papy Djilobodji	31	1	30	0	1	1	0	0
5	DF	(Tunisia) TUN	Oussama Haddadi	34	1	27+6	1	1	0	0	0
6	DF	(France) FRA	Wesley Lautoa	10	0	8+2	0	0	0	0	0
18	DF	(Central African Republic) CTA	Cédric Yambéré	33	3	31+1	3	0	0	1	0
19	DF	(France) FRA	Valentin Rosier	37	0	31+5	0	1	0	0	0
23	DF	(Switzerland) SUI	Vincent Rüfli	3	0	0+3	0	0	0	0	0
26	DF	(Morocco) MAR	Fouad Chafik	24	0	19+4	0	0	0	1	0
27	DF	(France) FRA	Cédric Varrault	12	1	10+1	1	1	0	0	0
Midfielders
7	MF	(France) FRA	Frédéric Sammaritano	28	1	16+10	0	1	0	1	1
8	MF	(Algeria) ALG	Mehdi Abeid	20	0	14+5	0	0	0	1	0
14	MF	(France) FRA	Jordan Marié	28	1	21+6	1	1	0	0	0
15	MF	(France) FRA	Florent Balmont	23	1	9+12	1	0+1	0	1	0
20	MF	(France) FRA	Romain Amalfitano	35	0	31+2	0	1	0	0+1	0
21	MF	(France) FRA	Eden Massouema	6	0	2+4	0	0	0	0	0
22	MF	(South Korea) KOR	Kwon Chang-hoon	36	11	26+8	11	1	0	1	0
28	MF	(Portugal) POR	Xeka	17	2	15+2	2	0	0	0	0
33	MF	(France) FRA	Erwan Maury	0	0	0	0	0	0	0	0
34	MF	(France) FRA	Enzo Loiodice	4	0	1+3	0	0	0	0	0
36	MF	(France) FRA	Adrián Sahibeddine	3	0	0+3	0	0	0	0	0
Forwards
9	FW	(France) FRA	Wesley Saïd	31	9	20+9	9	1	0	1	0
10	FW	(Tunisia) TUN	Naïm Sliti	33	7	26+5	7	0+1	0	0+1	0
11	FW	(Cape Verde) CPV	Júlio Tavares	28	13	23+3	12	1	1	0+1	0
29	FW	(France) FRA	Benjamin Jeannot	26	4	14+10	4	0+1	0	1	0
Players transferred out during the season
2	DF	(Hungary) HUN	Ádám Lang	4	0	3	0	0	0	1	0
24	MF	(Republic of the Congo) CGO	Dylan Bahamboula	4	0	0+4	0	0	0	0	0

Last updated: 30 May 2018
Source: BDFutbol
