= 2016–17 Dijon FCO season =

Dijon
2016–17 season
- Chairman: Olivier Delcourt
- Manager: Olivier Dall'Oglio
- Stadium: Stade Gaston Gérard
- Ligue 1: 16th
- Coupe de France: Round of 32
- Coupe de la Ligue: Third round
Home colours	Away colours

The 2016–17 Dijon FCO season was the 18th professional season of the club since its creation in 1998. During the campaign, they competed in Ligue 1, the Coupe de France and the Coupe de la Ligue.

== Competitions ==
=== Ligue 1 ===
==== League table ====
Pos	Team	Pld	W	D	L	GF	GA	GD	Pts	Qualification or relegation
14	Metz	38	11	10	17	39	72	−33	43	
15	Montpellier	38	10	9	19	48	66	−18	39	
16	Dijon	38	8	13	17	46	58	−12	37	
17	Caen	38	10	7	21	36	65	−29	37	
18	Lorient (R)	38	10	6	22	44	70	−26	36	Qualification for the relegation play-offs

Source: Ligue 1, Soccerway
Rules for classification: 1) Points; 2) Goal difference; 3) Goals scored; 4) Head-to-head goal difference; 5) Fairplay ranking.
(R) Relegated

==== Results summary ====
Overall								Home						Away					
Pld	W	D	L	GF	GA	GD	Pts	W	D	L	GF	GA	GD	W	D	L	GF	GA	GD
38	8	13	17	46	58	−12	37	7	6	6	27	21	+6	1	7	11	19	37	−18

Last updated: 20 May 2017.

==== Results by round ====
Round	1	2	3	4	5	6	7	8	9	10	11	12	13	14	15	16	17	18	19	20	21	22	23	24	25	26	27	28	29	30	31	32	33	34	35	36	37	38
Ground	H	A	H	A	H	A	H	H	A	H	A	H	A	A	H	A	H	A	H	A	H	A	H	A	H	A	A	H	A	H	A	H	A	H	H	A	H	A
Result	L	L	W	L	D	L	W	D	D	W	D	D	L	L	D	D	L	L	W	D	D	W	L	L	W	L	L	L	D	L	D	L	L	W	D	L	W	D
Position	16	17	15	16	16	19	14	15	17	13	12	11	14	14	15	15	17	18	15	16	15	13	16	17	13	17	18	18	17	17	17	19	19	18	17	18	16	16

A = Away; H = Home; W = Win; D = Draw; L = Loss

==== Matches ====
13 August 2016 Match 1	Dijon	0–1	Nantes	Dijon
20:00		Report	Thomsen 48' (yellow card) 73'; Iloki (yellow card) 67'	Stadium: Stade Gaston Gérard; Attendance: 9,236; Referee: (France) Karim Abed

20 August 2016 Match 2	Lille	1–0	Dijon	Villeneuve-d'Ascq
20:00	Palmieri (yellow card) 70'; Sankharé 87'	Report	Marié (yellow card) 41'; Balmont (yellow card) 62'	Stadium: Stade Pierre-Mauroy; Attendance: 25,548; Referee: (France) Olivier Thual

27 August 2016 Match 3	Dijon	4–2	Lyon	Dijon
17:00	Sammaritano 24' (pen.); Júlio Tavares 45+1'; Amalfitano (yellow card) 45+2'; Balmont (yellow card) 55'; Bahamboula 73'; Lees-Melou 88'	Report	Tolisso 20'; Nkoulou (yellow card) 22'; Lacazette 37'; Gonalons (yellow card) 74'	Stadium: Stade Gaston Gérard; Attendance: 10,369; Referee: (France) Johann Hamel

10 September 2016 Match 4	Angers	3–1	Dijon	Angers
20:00	Diedhiou 15'; Ketkeophomphone (yellow card) 19' (yellow-red card); N'Doye 67' (yellow card) 69'; Toko Ekambi 75'	Report	Sammaritano 8'; Rüfli (yellow card) 18'; Varrault (yellow card) 30'; Marié (yellow card) 48' (yellow-red card)	Stadium: Stade Raymond Kopa; Attendance: 9,549; Referee: (France) Mikael Lesage

17 September 2016 Match 5	Dijon	0–0	Metz	Dijon
20:00	Abeid (yellow card) 38'; Abdelhamid (yellow card) 40'; Balmont (yellow card) 50'; Rüfli (yellow card) 58'	Report	Doukouré (yellow card) 25' (yellow-red card); Erdinç (yellow card) 28'; Mandjeck (yellow card) 69'; Mollet (yellow card) 89'	Stadium: Stade Gaston Gérard; Attendance: 8,336; Referee: (France) Bartolomeu Varela

20 September 2016 Match 6	Paris Saint-Germain	3–0	Dijon	Paris
21:00	Lang 15' (o.g.); Cavani 27' (pen.); Kimpembe (yellow card) 57'; Lucas 67'	Report		Stadium: Parc des Princes; Attendance: 42,484; Referee: (France) Olivier Thual

24 September 2016 Match 7	Dijon	3–0	Rennes	Dijon
20:00	Diony 7' 78'; Varrault (yellow card) 13'; Marié 19'	Report	Prcić (yellow card) 34'	Stadium: Stade Gaston Gérard; Attendance: 8,148; Referee: (France) Sébastien Moreira

1 October 2016 Match 8	Dijon	3–3	Montpellier	Dijon
20:00	Dinoy 39'; Gastien (yellow card) 68'; Vanden Borre 81' (o.g.); Abeid (yellow card) 88'; Rivière 90'	Report	Ninga 18' 25' 58' (yellow card) 84'; Boudebouz (yellow card) 67'	Stadium: Stade Gaston Gérard; Attendance: 8,428; Referee: (France) François Letexier

16 October 2016 Match 9	Saint-Étienne	1–1	Dijon	Saint-Étienne
17:00	Théophile-Catherine (yellow card) 82'; Roux 90+5' (pen.)	Report	Lees-Melou 22'; Bernard (yellow card) 79'; Júlio Tavares (yellow card) 79'; Reynet (yellow card) 90+3'; Varrault (yellow card) 90+3' (yellow-red card)	Stadium: Stade Geoffroy-Guichard; Attendance: 25,528; Referee: (France) Karim Abed

22 October 2016 Match 10	Dijon	1–0	Lorient	Dijon
20:00	Lotiès 90+1'; Bahamboula (yellow card) 90+1'	Report	Guendouzi (yellow card) 45'; Cafú (yellow card) 89'	Stadium: Stade Gaston Gérard; Attendance: 8,558; Referee: (France) Sébastien Desiage

29 October 2016 Match 11	Bastia	0–0	Dijon	Furiani
20:00	Cahuzac (yellow card) 65'	Report	Sammaritano (yellow card) 72'	Stadium: Stade Armand Cesari; Attendance: 10,048; Referee: (France) Lionel Jaffredo

5 November 2016 Match 12	Dijon	3–3	Guingamp	Dijon
20:00	Varrault 6'; Diony 26'; Júlio Tavares 44'	Report	Coco 32'; Didot (yellow card) 39'; Mendy 79'; De Pauw 90+3'	Stadium: Stade Gaston Gérard; Attendance: 7,954; Referee: (France) Stéphane Lannoy

19 November 2016 Match 13	Nancy	1–0	Dijon	Tomblaine
20:00	Robic (yellow card) 31'; Badila 77'	Report	Lang (yellow card) 45+1'; Abeid (yellow card) 54'; Rüfli (yellow card) 61'	Stadium: Stade Marcel Picot; Attendance: 16,341; Referee: (France) Olivier Thual

26 November 2016 Match 14	Bordeaux	3–2	Dijon	Bordeaux
20:00 CET (UTC+1)	Rolan 48'; Kamano 88', 90+2'	Report	Abeid 44'; Tavares 62'; Lees-Melou (yellow card) 64'; Bouka Moutou (yellow card) 69'	Stadium: Nouveau Stade de Bordeaux; Attendance: 16,354; Referee: Bartolomeu Varela

29 November 2016 Match 15	Dijon	1–1	Monaco	Dijon
21:00 CET (UTC+1)	Rivière (yellow card) 20'; Sammaritano (yellow card) 84', (goal) 87'	Report	Carrillo 17'	Stadium: Stade Gaston Gérard; Attendance: 10,263; Referee: Tony Chapron

2 December 2016 Match 16	Caen	3–3	Dijon	Caen
20:45 CEST (UTC+01:00)	Santini 24', 37', (yellow card) 59'; Rodelin (yellow card) 28'; Karamoh 43'; Yahia (yellow card) 48'; Delaplace (yellow card) 77'	Report	Lees-Melou 26'; Bouka Moutou (yellow card) 29' (yellow-red card) 31'; Rüfli (yellow card) 51'; Abeid (yellow card) 56'; Diony 59'; Yahia 81' (o.g.)	Stadium: Stade Michel d'Ornano; Attendance: 13,243; Referee: Sébastien Moreira

10 December 2016 Match 17	Dijon	1–2	Marseille	Dijon
14:30 CEST (UTC+2)	Abeid 78'	Report	Lopez 6'; Gomis 87'	Stadium: Stade Gaston Gérard; Referee: Jérôme Miguelgorry

18 December 2016 Match 18	Nice	2–1	Dijon	Nice
15:00 CET (UTC+1)	Balotelli 32' (pen.), 50'; Souquet (yellow card) 36'	Report	Abdelhamid (yellow card) 31'; Tavares 37' (pen.); Rüfli (yellow card) 41'; Gastien (yellow card) 84'; Varrault (red card) 88'	Stadium: Allianz Riviera; Attendance: 22,229; Referee: Benoît Millot

21 December 2016 Match 19	Dijon	2–0	Toulouse	Dijon
20:50 CET (UTC+01:00)	Rüfli (yellow card) 35'; Tavares 50'; Lees-Melou 52'; Gastien (yellow card) 57'	Report	Yago (yellow card) 49'; Jullien (yellow card) 60'; Akpa Akpro (yellow card) 60'; Somalia (yellow card) 89'	Stadium: Stade Gaston Gérard; Attendance: 8,634; Referee: Frank Schneider

14 January 2017 Match 20	Montpellier	1–1	Dijon	Montpellier
20:00 CET (UTC+1)	Roussillon 87'	Report	Tavares 27'	Stadium: Stade de la Mosson; Attendance: 14,539; Referee: Jérôme Brisard

21 January 2017 Match 21	Dijon	0–0	Lille	Dijon
20:00 CET (UTC+1)	Lang (yellow card) 29'; Lotiès (yellow card) 47'	Report	Benzia (yellow card) 27'; Béria (yellow card) 57'	Stadium: Stade Gaston Gérard; Attendance: 7,828; Referee: Jérôme Miguelgorry

28 January 2017 Match 22	Lorient	2–3	Dijon	Lorient
20:00	Peybernes (yellow card) 29'; Marveaux 50'; Waris 60' (pen.); Lautoa (yellow card) 69'; Mesloub (yellow card) 72'; Moreira (yellow card) 86'	Report	Diony 10'; Rüfli (yellow card) 56'; Lang (yellow card) 59'; Balmont (yellow card) 62'; Lotiès 70'; Lees-Melou 90+3'	Stadium: Stade du Moustoir – Yves Allainmat; Attendance: 9,762; Referee: Olivier Thual

4 February 2017 Match 23	Dijon	1–3	Paris Saint-Germain	Dijon
20:00 CET (UTC+1)	Tavares 31'; Rüfli (yellow card) 53'	Report	Lucas 29'; Motta (yellow card) 32'; Silva 81'; Cavani 85'; Aurier (yellow card) 87'	Stadium: Stade Gaston Gérard; Attendance: 13,416; Referee: Amaury Delerue

8 February 2017 Match 24	Metz	2–1	Dijon	Metz
19:00	Sarr 46'; Diabaté 66' (pen.)	Report	Varrault 78'	Stadium: Stade Saint-Symphorien; Attendance: 11,971; Referee: Sébastien Desiage

11 February 2017 Match 25	Dijon	2–0	Caen	Dijon
20:00 CEST (UTC+01:00)	Abeid 40'; Marié (yellow card) 46'; Diony 86'	Summary		Stadium: Stade Gaston Gérard; Attendance: 9,614; Referee: Jérôme Brisard

19 February 2017 Match 26	Lyon	4–2	Dijon	Décines-Charpieu
17:00 CEST (UTC+2)	Tolisso 11', 80'; Mammana (yellow card) 70'; Lacazette 84' (pen.); Fekir 90'	Report	Júlio Tavares 29', (yellow card) 83'; Diony 48'; Balmont (yellow card) 55'; Haddadi (yellow card) 57'; Amalfitano (yellow card) 66'	Stadium: Parc Olympique Lyonnais; Attendance: 35,197; Referee: Benoît Millot

24 February 2017 Match 27	Nantes	3–1	Dijon	Nantes
15:00 CET (UTC+1)	Bammou 3'; Sala 59' (pen.); Felipe Pardo 79'	Report	Dubois 37' (o.g.)	Stadium: Stade de la Beaujoire; Attendance: 19,915; Referee: Tony Chapron

4 March 2017 Match 28	Dijon	0–1	Nice	Dijon
20:00 CET (UTC+1)	Abeid (yellow card) 24'; Lees-Melou (yellow card) 27'	Report	Cyprien (yellow card) 37', (goal) 69'	Stadium: Stade Gaston Gérard; Attendance: 10,209; Referee: Bartolomeu Varela

11 March 2017 Match 29	Rennes	1–1	Dijon	Rennes
20:00 CET (UTC+1)	Bensebaini (yellow card) 41'; Saïd 58'; Danzé (yellow card) 85'	Report	Chafik (yellow card) 3'; Tavares 42'	Stadium: Roazhon Park; Attendance: 19,067; Referee: Olivier Thual

19 March 2017 Match 30	Dijon	0–1	Saint-Étienne	Dijon
17:00 CEST (UTC+2)	Diony (yellow card) 65'; Abeid (yellow card) 84'	Report	Veretout 77'; M'Bengue (yellow card) 90+1'	Stadium: Stade Gaston Gérard; Attendance: 12,960; Referee: Benoît Bastien

1 April 2017 Match 31	Marseille	1–1	Dijon	Marseille
17:00 CEST (UTC+2)	Gomis (yellow card) 14'; Payet 48'; Rolando (yellow card) 72'	Report	Kwon (yellow card) 16'; Tavares (yellow card) 37'; Sertic 45+1' (o.g.); Abeid (yellow card) 51'; Varrault (yellow card) 67'	Stadium: Stade Vélodrome; Attendance: 36,116; Referee: Johan Hamel

8 April 2017 Match 32	Dijon	1–2	Bastia	Dijon
20:00 CEST (UTC+2)	Lees-Melou 29'; Abeid (yellow card) 87'; Rivière (yellow card) 89'	Report	Crivelli 17'; Cahuzac 58'	Stadium: Stade Gaston Gérard; Attendance: 11,712; Referee: François Letexier

15 April 2017 Match 33	Monaco	2–1	Dijon	Monaco
21:00 CEST (UTC+2)	Fabinho (yellow card) 59'; Dirar 69'; Falcao 81'	Report	Varrault 42'; Sammaritano (yellow card) 67'; Lees-Melou (yellow card) 68'; Bouka Moutou (yellow card) 90+2'	Stadium: Stade Louis II; Attendance: 9,069; Referee: Jerome Miguelgorry

22 April 2017 Match 34	Dijon	3–2	Angers	Dijon
20:00 CEST (UTC+2)	Diony 5', 43'; Lees-Melou 16'; Chafik (yellow card) 67'; Lotiès (yellow card) 90+3'	Report	Mangani 68' (pen.), (yellow card) 81'; Toko Ekambi 70'; Diedhiou (yellow card) 84'	Stadium: Stade Gaston Gérard; Attendance: 10,418; Referee: Sébastien Desiage

30 April 2017 Match 35	Dijon	0–0	Bordeaux	Dijon
17:00 CET (UTC+1)		Report	Lewczuk (yellow card) 25'	Stadium: Stade Gaston Gérard; Attendance: 12,596; Referee: (France) Bartolomeu Varela

6 May 2017 Match 36	Guingamp	4–0	Dijon	Guingamp
20:00 CEST (UTC+01:00)	Briand 4' 64'; Salibur 55' 59' (pen.)	Report		Stadium: Stade de Roudourou; Attendance: 13,055; Referee: Tony Chapron

14 May 2017 Match 37	Dijon	2–0	Nancy	Dijon
21:00 CET (UTC+1)	Haddadi (yellow card) 8'; Sammaritano 51'; Diony 76' (yellow card) 77'	Summary	Cuffaut (yellow card) 22'; Dalé (yellow card) 54'	Stadium: Stade Gaston Gérard; Attendance: 13,212; Referee: (France) Antony Gautier

20 May 2017 Match 38	Toulouse	0–0	Dijon	Toulouse
21:00 CEST (UTC+02:00)	Toivonen (yellow card) 64'	Report	Loties (yellow card) 40'; Balmont (yellow card) 44'	Stadium: Stadium Municipal; Attendance: 19,768; Referee: Tony Chapron
