= 2018–19 Dijon FCO season =

Dijon
2018–19 season
- Chairman: Olivier Delcourt
- Manager: Olivier Dall'Oglio
- Stadium: Stade Gaston Gérard
- Ligue 1: 18th (play-off winners)
- Coupe de France: Quarter-finals
- Coupe de la Ligue: Round of 16
- Top goalscorer: League: Júlio Tavares (5); All: Naïm Sliti (10)
- Highest home attendance: League/All: 15,117 v. PSG (12 March 2019)
- Lowest home attendance: 11,711 v. Guingamp (5 December 2018); All: 4,661 v. Bordeaux (19 December 2018, CdlL Ro16)
- Average home league attendance: 13,044
- Biggest win: 4–0 at Nice (25 August 2018)
- Biggest defeat: 0–4 (thrice); 3 November 2018 v. Nîmes; 12 March 2019 v. PSG; 18 May 2019 at PSG
Home colours	Away colours	Third colours

The 2018–19 Dijon FCO season was the 20th professional season of the club since its creation in 1998.

== Players ==
Note: Flags indicate national team as defined under FIFA eligibility rules; some limited exceptions apply. Players may hold more than one non-FIFA nationality.

No.	Pos.	Nation	Player
1	GK	ISL	Rúnar Alex Rúnarsson
2	DF	GLP	Mickaël Alphonse
3	DF	CGO	Arnold Bouka Moutou
4	DF	MAR	Nayef Aguerd
5	DF	TUN	Oussama Haddadi
7	MF	FRA	Frédéric Sammaritano
8	MF	ALG	Mehdi Abeid
9	FW	FRA	Wesley Saïd
10	MF	TUN	Naïm Sliti
11	FW	CPV	Júlio Tavares (captain)
12	MF	FRA	Enzo Loiodice
14	MF	FRA	Jordan Marié
15	MF	FRA	Florent Balmont

No.	Pos.	Nation	Player
16	GK	FRA	Bobby Allain
18	DF	CAF	Cédric Yambéré
19	DF	FRA	Valentin Rosier
20	MF	FRA	Romain Amalfitano (vice-captain)
22	MF	KOR	Kwon Chang-hoon
23	FW	GUI	Jules Keita
24	DF	NCL	Wesley Lautoa
25	DF	FRA	Senou Coulibaly
26	DF	MAR	Fouad Chafik
28	FW	GUI	Sory Kaba
29	FW	FRA	Benjamin Jeannot
30	GK	FRA	Lévi Ntumba

=== Out on loan ===
Note: Flags indicate national team as defined under FIFA eligibility rules; some limited exceptions apply. Players may hold more than one non-FIFA nationality.

No.	Pos.	Nation	Player
—	MF	FRA	Eden Massouema (on loan to Valenciennes)

== Competitions ==
=== Ligue 1 ===
==== League table ====
Pos	Team	Pld	W	D	L	GF	GA	GD	Pts	Qualification or relegation
16	Toulouse	38	8	14	16	35	57	−22	38	
17	Monaco	38	8	12	18	38	57	−19	36	
18	Dijon (O)	38	9	7	22	31	60	−29	34	Qualification to Relegation play-offs
19	Caen (R)	38	7	12	19	29	54	−25	33	Relegation to Ligue 2
20	Guingamp (R)	38	5	12	21	28	68	−40	27	Relegation to Ligue 2

Source: Ligue 1 and Soccerway
Rules for classification: 1) Points; 2) Goal difference; 3) Head-to-head points; 4) Head-to-head goal difference; 5) Head-to-head goals scored; 6) Head-to-head away goals scored; 7) Goals scored; 8) Away goals scored; 9) Most goals scored in single league match; 10) Fairplay ranking.
(O) Play-off winners; (R) Relegated

==== Results summary ====
Overall								Home						Away					
Pld	W	D	L	GF	GA	GD	Pts	W	D	L	GF	GA	GD	W	D	L	GF	GA	GD
38	9	7	22	31	60	−29	34	6	4	9	18	29	−11	3	3	13	13	31	−18

Last updated: 24 May 2019.
Source: Competitive matches

==== Results by round ====
Round	1	2	3	4	5	6	7	8	9	10	11	12	13	14	15	16	17	18	19	20	21	22	23	24	25	26	27	28	29	30	31	32	33	34	35	36	37	38
Ground	A	H	A	H	H	A	H	A	A	H	A	H	A	H	A	H	A	H	A	H	A	H	A	H	A	H	A	H	A	H	A	H	H	A	A	H	A	H
Result	W	W	W	L	L	D	L	L	L	L	D	L	L	D	D	W	L	L	L	D	L	W	L	L	L	L	L	D	L	L	W	D	W	L	L	W	L	W
Position	8	3	2	2	5	7	9	12	16	16	17	17	18	18	17	16	16	17	18	18	18	16	16	17	17	19	19	18	19	20	18	18	18	19	19	19	19	18

Source: Results
A = Away; H = Home; W = Win; D = Draw; L = Loss

==== Matches ====
Win Draw Loss

11 August 2018 1	Montpellier	1–2	Dijon	Montpellier
20:00 CEST (UTC+2)	Pedro Mendes 5', (yellow card) 33'; Aguilar (yellow card) 81'	Report	Coulibaly (yellow card) 33', (goal) 90+1'; Tavares 52'; Yambéré (yellow card) 80'	Stadium: Stade de la Mosson; Attendance: 12,765; Referee: Florent Batta

18 August 2018 2	Dijon	2–0	Nantes	Dijon
20:00 CEST (UTC+2)	Tavares 8', 74'	Report	Diego Carlos (yellow card) 43'; A. Touré (red card)	Stadium: Stade Gaston Gérard; Attendance: 13,617; Referee: Jérémy Stinat

25 August 2018 3	Nice	0–4	Dijon	Nice
20:00 CEST (UTC+2)	Saint-Maximin (yellow card) 54'; Le Bihan (yellow card) 88'	Report	Aguerd (yellow card) 6', (goal) 67'; Lautoa (yellow card) 38'; Keita 86', 90+3', (yellow card) 86'	Stadium: Allianz Riviera; Attendance: 17,923; Referee: Willy Delajod

1 September 2018 4	Dijon	0–2	Caen	Dijon
20:00 CEST (UTC+2)		Report	Crivelli 21'; Djiku (yellow card) 35'; Samba (yellow card) 77'; Beauvue (yellow card) 80' (goal) 90+4'	Stadium: Stade Gaston Gérard; Attendance: 13,382; Referee: Nicolas Rainville

15 September 2018 5	Dijon	1–3	Angers	Dijon
20:00 CEST (UTC+2)	Loiodice (yellow card) 3'; Saïd 13'; Haddadi (yellow card) 32'	Report	Bahoken 20'; Tait 29'; Santamaria 38'; Pavlović (yellow card) 54'; Kanga (yellow card) 72'	Stadium: Stade Gaston Gérard; Attendance: 12,273; Referee: Hakim Ben El Hadj

22 September 2018 6	Reims	0–0	Dijon	Reims
20:00 CEST (UTC+2)	Doumbia (yellow card) 32'	Report	Abeid (yellow card) 58'	Stadium: Stade Auguste Delaune; Attendance: 11,523; Referee: Jérôme Brisard

26 September 2018 7	Dijon	0–3	Lyon	Dijon
19:00 CEST (UTC+2)	Loiodice (yellow card) 56' (yellow-red card) 90+3'	Report	Dembélé 16', 19'; Terrier 35'; Tousart (yellow card) 59' (yellow-red card) 67'	Stadium: Stade Gaston Gérard; Attendance: 14,651; Referee: Jérôme Miguelgorry

29 September 2018 8	Strasbourg	3–0	Dijon	Strasbourg
20:00 CEST (UTC+2)	Da Costa 13'; Martin (yellow card) 32', (goal) 90+2'; Mothiba 81'	Report	Keita (yellow card) 22'; Yambéré (yellow card) 31'; Lautoa (yellow card) 63'	Stadium: Stade de la Meinau; Attendance: 25,060; Referee: Eric Wattellier

6 October 2018 9	Amiens	1–0	Dijon	Amiens
20:00 CEST (UTC+2)	Ghoddos 39'	Report		Stadium: Stade de la Licorne; Attendance: 10,194; Referee: Florent Batta

20 October 2018 10	Dijon	1–2	Lille	Dijon
20:00 CEST (UTC+2)	Loiodice (yellow card) 31'; Abeid 81' (pen.); Haddadi (yellow card) 90+2'	Report	Pépé 21' (pen.); Araújo 43'; Soumaré (yellow card) 79'; Maignan (yellow card) 81'	Stadium: Stade Gaston Gérard; Attendance: 13,004; Referee: Thomas Léonard

27 October 2018 11	Monaco	2–2	Dijon	Monaco
20:00 CEST (UTC+2)	Henrichs 30'; Tielemans (yellow card) 54'; Glik 78'; Golovin (yellow card) 81'	Report	Alphonse 34'; Loiodice (yellow card) 51'; Abeid 57'; Marié (yellow card) 90'; Tavares (yellow card) 90+2'	Stadium: Stade Louis II; Attendance: 7,139; Referee: Jérôme Miguelgorry

3 November 2018 12	Dijon	0–4	Nîmes	Dijon
20:00 CET (UTC+1)	Ciman (yellow card) 28'	Report	Bouanga 5', 65'; Savanier 30'; Briançon 86'	Stadium: Stade Gaston Gérard; Attendance: 12,113; Referee: Frank Schneider

11 November 2018 13	Marseille	2–0	Dijon	Marseille
17:00 CET (UTC+1)	Ocampos 45+3'; Rami 84'	Report	Lautoa (yellow card) 12'; Ciman (yellow card) 44'	Stadium: Stade Vélodrome; Attendance: 47,430; Referee: Willy Delajod

24 November 2018 14	Dijon	0–0	Bordeaux	Dijon
20:00 CET (UTC+1)	Rosier (yellow card) 23'; Abeid (yellow card) 29'	Report	Kamano (yellow card) 49'	Stadium: Stade Gaston Gérard; Attendance: 12,285; Referee: François Letexier

2 December 2018 15	Toulouse	2–2	Dijon	Toulouse
15:00 CET (UTC+1)	Reynet (red card) 5'; Gradel 72'; Leya Iseka (yellow card) 73', (goal) 77'	Report	Lautoa (yellow card) 3'; Aguerd 25'; Abeid (yellow card) 63', (goal) 68'; Sammaritano (yellow card) 90+2'	Stadium: Stadium Municipal; Attendance: 10,279; Referee: Jérôme Miguelgorry

5 December 2018 16	Dijon	2–1	Guingamp	Dijon
19:00 CET (UTC+1)	Jeannot 14'; Rosier (yellow card) 18'; Tavares (yellow card) 45+2'; Lautoa (yellow card) 59' (yellow-red card) 71'; Haddadi (yellow card) 81', (goal) 86'; Abeid (yellow card) 89'	Report	Rebocho (yellow card) 43'; Coco 79'	Stadium: Stade Gaston Gérard; Attendance: 11,711; Referee: Thomas Leonard

8 December 2018 17	Rennes	2–0	Dijon	Rennes
20:00 CET (UTC+1)	Bourigeaud 69'; Zeffane (yellow card) 78'; Ben Arfa 90'	Report	Ciman (yellow card) 22'; Jeannot (yellow card) 71'	Stadium: Roazhon Park; Attendance: 16,975; Referee: Nicolas Rainville

15 December 2018 18	Dijon	Postponed	Paris Saint-Germain	Dijon
21:00 CET (UTC+1)				Stadium: Stade Gaston Gérard; Referee: Jérémy Stinat
Note: Match postponed due to security concerns as a result of the yellow vests movement.

22 December 2018 19	Saint-Étienne	3–0	Dijon	Nantes
21:00 CET (UTC+1)	Monnet-Paquet 43'; Polomat (yellow card) 45+1'; Kolodziejczak (yellow card) 52'; M'Vila (yellow card) 55'; Khazri 64'; Berić 83'; Selnæs (yellow card) 89'	Report	Marié (yellow card) 19'; Saïd (yellow card) 82'; Balmont (yellow card) 89'	Stadium: Stade de la Beaujoire; Attendance: 26,215; Referee: Eric Wattellier

13 January 2019 20	Dijon	1–1	Montpellier	Dijon
20:00 CET (UTC+1)	Saïd 54'; Tavares (yellow card) 88'; Lautoa (yellow card) 90'	Report	Le Tallec 61'	Stadium: Stade Gaston Gérard; Attendance: 11,910; Referee: Benoît Bastien

20 January 2019 21	Bordeaux	1–0	Dijon	Bordeaux
20:00 CET (UTC+1)	Karamoh (yellow card) 11'; Cornelius (yellow card) 64', (goal) 77'; Jovanović (yellow card) 71'	Report	Amalfitano (red card) 34'; Abeid (yellow card) 51'; Haddadi (yellow card) 62'; Yambéré (yellow card) 71'	Stadium: Matmut Atlantique; Attendance: 13,380; Referee: Johan Hamel

26 January 2019 22	Dijon	2–0	Monaco	Dijon
20:00 CET (UTC+1)	Kwon 24'; Sliti 69'; Saïd (yellow card) 79'; Haddadi (yellow card) 90'; Lautoa (yellow card) 90'	Report	Tielemans (yellow card) 49'; Naldo (red card) 60'; Henrichs (yellow card) 62'	Stadium: Stade Gaston Gérard; Attendance: 12,060; Referee: Eric Wattellier

2 February 2019 23	Angers	1–0	Dijon	Angers
20:00 CET (UTC+1)	Bahoken 27'	Report		Stadium: Stade Raymond Kopa; Attendance: 8,451; Referee: Florent Batta

8 February 2019 24	Dijon	1–2	Marseille	Dijon
20:45 CET (UTC+1)	Marié 18'; Yambéré (yellow card) 43'; Lautoa (yellow card) 50'; Chafik (yellow card) 90+3'	Report	Balotelli 56', (yellow card) 81'; Sanson (yellow card) 72'; Ocampos 74'; Kamara (yellow card) 90+5'	Stadium: Stade Gaston Gérard; Attendance: 15,095; Referee: Thomas Leonard

15 February 2019 25	Nîmes	2–0	Dijon	Nîmes
19:00 CET (UTC+1)	Savanier 28'; Ferri (yellow card) 35'; Landre (yellow card) 58'; Bobichon 83'	Report	Chafik (yellow card) 13'; Abeid (yellow card) 35'; Lautoa (yellow card) 54'; Haddadi (yellow card) 66' (yellow-red card) 89'	Stadium: Stade des Costières; Attendance: 12,703; Referee: Jérôme Miguelgorry

22 February 2019 26	Dijon	0–1	Saint-Étienne	Dijon
19:00 CET (UTC+1)		Report	Subotić 64'	Stadium: Stade Gaston Gérard; Attendance: 13,511; Referee: Karim Abed

3 March 2019 27	Lille	1–0	Dijon	Villeneuve-d'Ascq
15:00 CET (UTC+1)	Lautoa 72' (o.g.)	Report	Saïd (yellow card) 29'	Stadium: Stade Pierre-Mauroy; Attendance: 32,722; Referee: Olivier Thual

9 March 2019 28	Dijon	1–1	Reims	Dijon
20:00 CET (UTC+1)	Coulibaly (red card) 3'; Sliti 13' (pen.), (yellow card) 69'	Report	Zeneli 9'; Chavalerin (yellow card) 81'	Stadium: Stade Gaston Gérard; Attendance: 12,317; Referee: Florent Batta

12 March 2019 18	Dijon	0–4	Paris Saint-Germain	Dijon
19:00 CET (UTC+1)	Lautoa (yellow card) 49'; Keita (yellow card) 69'	Report	Marquinhos 7', (yellow card) 37'; Mbappé 40'; Di María 50'; Choupo-Moting 90+2'	Stadium: Stade Gaston Gérard; Attendance: 15,117; Referee: Jérôme Miguelgorry
Note: The match, originally scheduled for 15 December 2018, was postponed due to security concerns as a result of the yellow vests movement.

16 March 2019 29	Guingamp	1–0	Dijon	Guingamp
20:00 CET (UTC+1)	Blas 86' (pen.)	Report	Allain (yellow card) 85'; Kwon (yellow card) 90+2'	Stadium: Stade de Roudourou; Attendance: 15,834; Referee: Mikael Lesage

31 March 2019 30	Dijon	0–1	Nice	Dijon
15:00 CEST (UTC+2)	Sammaritano (yellow card) 29' (yellow-red card) 54'; Marié (yellow card) 39'	Report	Lees-Melou 60'; Burner (yellow card) 64'	Stadium: Stade Gaston Gérard; Attendance: 12,345; Referee: Nicolas Rainville

6 April 2019 31	Lyon	1–3	Dijon	Décines-Charpieu
17:00 CEST (UTC+2)	Terrier 1'; Depay (yellow card) 87'	Report	Saïd 3'; Marcelo 7' (o.g.); Rafael 65' (o.g.); Lautoa (yellow card) 79'; Marié (yellow card) 90'	Stadium: Parc Olympique Lyonnais; Attendance: 52,439; Referee: Johan Hamel

12 April 2019 32	Dijon	0–0	Amiens	Dijon
19:00 CEST (UTC+2)	Saïd (yellow card) 23'; Amalfitano (yellow card) 27'; Tavares (yellow card) 54'	Report	Gnahoré (yellow card) 31' (yellow-red card) 90+2'; Monconduit (yellow card) 53'	Stadium: Stade Gaston Gérard; Attendance: 12,532; Referee: Karim Abed

19 April 2019 33	Dijon	3–2	Rennes	Dijon
19:00 CEST (UTC+2)	Aguerd 20', (yellow card) 79'; Jeannot 55', (yellow card) 70'; Saïd 83'	Report	Grenier (yellow card) 37'; Hunou 52'; Sarr (yellow card) 57'; Niang 61', (yellow card) 77'	Stadium: Stade Gaston Gérard; Attendance: 12,751; Referee: Olivier Thual

28 April 2019 34	Caen	1–0	Dijon	Caen
15:00 CEST (UTC+2)	Tchokounté (yellow card) 25'; Fajr 67'	Report	Balmont (yellow card) 40'; Sammaritano (yellow card) 44'; Lautoa (yellow card) 50'; Sliti (yellow card) 75'	Stadium: Stade Michel d'Ornano; Attendance: 19,004; Referee: Antony Gautier

5 May 2019 35	Nantes	3–0	Dijon	Nantes
15:00 CEST (UTC+2)	Touré 51'; Coulibaly 74' (pen.); Rongier 80'	Report	Aguerd (yellow card) 71', (red card) 73'; Amalfitano (yellow card) 71'	Stadium: Stade de la Beaujoire; Attendance: 19,482; Referee: Benoît Bastien

11 May 2019 36	Dijon	2–1	Strasbourg	Dijon
20:00 CEST (UTC+2)	Balmont (yellow card) 14'; Tavares 40' (pen.); Kwon 90+4'	Report	Ajorque 68', (yellow card) 89'	Stadium: Stade Gaston Gérard; Attendance: 13,105; Referee: Hakim Ben El Hadj

18 May 2019 37	Paris Saint-Germain	4–0	Dijon	Paris
21:00 CEST (UTC+2)	Di María 3'; Cavani 4'; Meunier (yellow card) 31'; Mbappé 36', 57'	Report	Amalfitano (yellow card) 71'	Stadium: Parc des Princes; Attendance: 47,532; Referee: Jérôme Brisard

24 May 2019 38	Dijon	2–1	Toulouse	Dijon
21:05 CEST (UTC+2)	Aguerd (yellow card) 37'; Sliti 58'; Tavares 63'; Jeannot (yellow card) 88'	Report	Sidibé (yellow card) 26'; Diakité 33'; Jullien (yellow card) 84'	Stadium: Stade Gaston Gérard; Attendance: 14,050; Referee: Mikael Lesage

==== Relegation play-offs ====
30 May 2019 First leg	Lens	1–1	Dijon	Lens
20:45 CEST (UTC+2)	Bellegarde 49'; Centonze (yellow card) 78'	Report	Balmont (yellow card) 5'; Lautoa (yellow card) 10'; Coulibaly (yellow card) 23'; Kwon 81'	Stadium: Stade Bollaert-Delelis; Attendance: 37,355; Referee: Amaury Delerue

2 June 2019 Second leg	Dijon	3–1 (4–2 agg.)	Lens	Dijon
21:15 CEST (UTC+2)	Sliti 28', 90'; Saïd 70'	Report	Duverne 39'; Doucouré (yellow card) 51'	Stadium: Stade Gaston Gérard; Attendance: 15,367; Referee: Ruddy Buquet

=== Coupe de France ===
5 January 2019 Round of 64	SC Schiltigheim	1–3	Dijon	Schiltigheim
18:00 CET (UTC+1)	Kodjia (yellow card) 23'; Vidović (yellow card) 29'; Genghini 77' (pen.)	Report	Sliti 64'; Kwon 72'; Rúnarsson (yellow card) 77'; Amalfitano (yellow card) 86'; Tavares 90'	Stadium: Stade de l'Aar; Attendance: 1,604; Referee: Willy Delajod

23 January 2019 Round of 32	Saint-Étienne	3–6	Dijon	Saint-Étienne
18:30 CET (UTC+1)	Diony 14'; Ruffier (yellow card) 50'; Khazri (yellow card) 58'; Berić 60'; Monnet-Paquet 64'	Report	Sliti 11', 28', 50' (pen.); Keita 47'; Tavares 52'; Alphonse (yellow card) 84'; Marié 90+2'	Stadium: Stade Geoffroy-Guichard; Attendance: 8,193; Referee: François Letexier

5 February 2019 Round of 16	Iris Club de Croix	0–3	Dijon	Croix
18:30 CET (UTC+1)	Tamanate (red card) 4'; Robail (yellow card) 55'	Report	Tavares 6' (pen.); Balmont 27'; Saïd 90+3'	Stadium: Stade Henri Seigneur; Attendance: 2,500; Referee: Olivier Thual

26 February 2019 Quarter-final	Paris Saint-Germain	3–0	Dijon	Paris
21:00 CET (UTC+1)	Di María 8', 28'; Verratti (yellow card) 43'; Meunier 76'	Report	Coulibaly (yellow card) 74'	Stadium: Parc des Princes; Referee: Frank Schneider

=== Coupe de la Ligue ===
31 October 2018 Round of 32	Dijon	3–1	Caen	Dijon
21:05 CET (UTC+1)	Saïd 3', 79' (yellow card) 65'; Sliti 7'; Yambéré (yellow card) 58'	Report	Khaoui 50'; Crivelli (yellow card) 56'; Fajr (yellow card) 58'	Stadium: Stade Gaston Gérard; Attendance: 10,193; Referee: Johan Hamel

19 December 2018 Round of 16	Dijon	0–1	Bordeaux	Dijon
21:05 CET (UTC+1)	Balmont (yellow card) 10'; Haddadi (yellow card) 74'	Report	Palencia (yellow card) 16'; Kalu (yellow card) 43'; Bašić 66'	Stadium: Stade Gaston Gérard; Attendance: 4,661; Referee: Florent Batta

== Statistics ==
=== Appearances and goals ===
No.	Pos	Nat	Player	Total		Ligue 1		Coupe de France		Coupe de la Ligue		Relegation Play-offs	
No.	Pos	Nat	Player	Apps	Goals	Apps	Goals	Apps	Goals	Apps	Goals	Apps	Goals
Goalkeepers
1	GK	(Iceland) ISL	Rúnar Alex Rúnarsson	31	0	25	0	4	0	1	0	1	0
16	GK	(France) FRA	Bobby Allain	16	0	13	0	1	0	1	0	1	0
30	GK	(France) FRA	Lévi Ntumba	0	0	0	0	0	0	0	0	0	0
Defenders
2	DF	(Guadeloupe) GLP	Mickaël Alphonse	16	1	6+5	1	2	0	1	0	2	0
3	DF	(Republic of the Congo) CGO	Arnold Bouka Moutou	5	0	0+3	0	2	0	0	0	0	0
4	DF	(Morocco) MAR	Nayef Aguerd	17	3	12+1	3	3	0	1	0	0	0
5	DF	(Tunisia) TUN	Oussama Haddadi	39	2	30+2	2	3	0	2	0	1+1	0
18	DF	(Central African Republic) CAF	Cédric Yambéré	38	0	30+3	0	1	0	2	0	2	0
19	DF	(France) FRA	Valentin Rosier	19	0	16+2	0	0	0	1	0	0	0
24	DF	(New Caledonia) NCL	Wesley Lautoa	40	0	34	0	3	0	0+1	0	2	0
25	DF	(France) FRA	Senou Coulibaly	15	1	6+3	1	3	0	1	0	2	0
26	DF	(Morocco) MAR	Fouad Chafik	26	0	21	0	2	0	1+1	0	1	0
Midfielders
7	MF	(France) FRA	Frédéric Sammaritano	15	0	6+8	0	0+1	0	0	0	0	0
8	MF	(Algeria) ALG	Mehdi Abeid	29	3	23+3	3	1	0	0	0	0+2	0
10	MF	(Tunisia) TUN	Naïm Sliti	42	10	25+10	3	3	4	2	1	2	2
12	MF	(France) FRA	Enzo Loiodice	14	0	10+2	0	2	0	0	0	0	0
14	MF	(France) FRA	Jordan Marié	33	2	20+6	1	0+3	1	2	0	1+1	0
15	MF	(France) FRA	Florent Balmont	28	1	15+5	0	3+1	1	1+1	0	2	0
20	MF	(France) FRA	Romain Amalfitano	38	0	30+2	0	3	0	2	0	1	0
22	MF	(South Korea) KOR	Kwon Chang-hoon	24	4	10+9	2	3	1	0+1	0	0+1	1
Forwards
9	FW	(France) FRA	Wesley Saïd	42	8	25+9	4	1+3	1	2	2	2	1
11	FW	(Cape Verde) CPV	Júlio Tavares	42	8	31+5	5	4	3	0+2	0	0	0
23	FW	(Guinea) GUI	Jules Keita	21	3	2+15	2	2+2	1	0	0	0	0
28	FW	(Guinea) GUI	Sory Kaba	11	0	2+7	0	0+1	0	0	0	1	0
29	FW	(France) FRA	Benjamin Jeannot	25	2	19+2	2	0	0	2	0	1+1	0
Players transferred out during the season
6	DF	(Belgium) BEL	Laurent Ciman	9	0	7+2	0	0	0	0	0	0	0
28	MF	(France) FRA	Yoann Gourcuff	8	0	0+8	0	0	0	0	0	0	0

Last updated: 2 June 2019
Source: Competitions
