= Nayef Aguerd =

Moroccan footballer (born 1996)

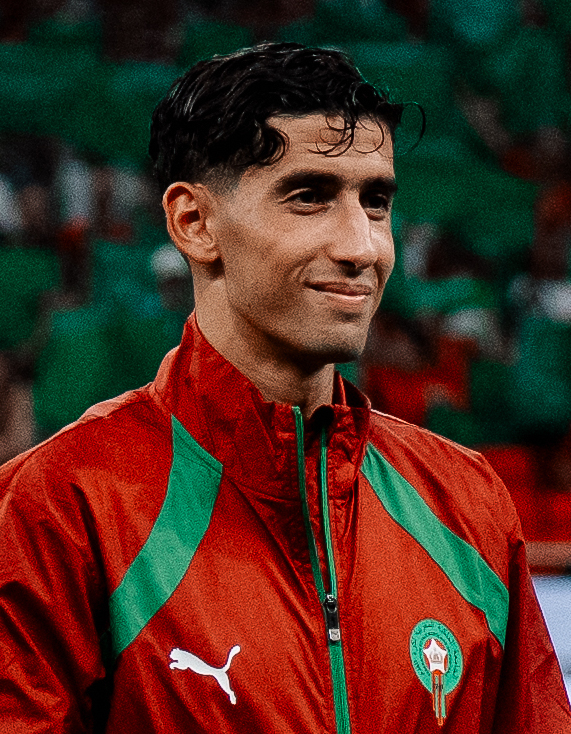
- Aguerd with Morocco in 2025

Personal information
- Full name: Nayef Aguerd
- Date of birth: 30 March 1996 (age 30)
- Place of birth: Kenitra, Morocco
- Height: 1.90 m (6 ft 3 in)
- Position: Centre-back

Team information
- Current team: Marseille
- Number: 21

Youth career
- 2011–2012: Kenitra Athletic Club
- 2012–2014: Mohammed VI Academy

Senior career*
Years	Team	Apps	(Gls)
2014–2018	FUS Rabat	73	(5)
2018–2020	Dijon	25	(4)
2020–2022	Rennes	66	(5)
2022–2025	West Ham United	41	(3)
2024–2025	→ Real Sociedad (loan)	21	(0)
2025–	Marseille	27	(1)

International career^{‡}
2015	Morocco U23	4	(0)
2016–	Morocco	66	(2)
Medal record
Men's football
Representing Morocco
Africa Cup of Nations
Winner	2025 Morocco
African Nations Championship
Winner	2018 Morocco
- * Club domestic league appearances and goals as of 21:44, 22 November 2026 (UTC) ‡ National team caps and goals as of 23:12, 4 October 2026 (UTC)

Nayef Aguerd (Arabic: نايف أكرد; Berber languages: ⵏⴰⵢⴼ ⴰⴳⵕⴹ; born 30 March 1996) is a Moroccan professional footballer who plays as a centre-back for Ligue 1 club Marseille and the Morocco national team.

He began his professional career playing for Botola side FUS Rabat, before leaving to France and playing for Dijon and Rennes. He was chosen in Morocco's squads for the African Nations Championship in 2018, the Africa Cup of Nations in 2021, 2023 and 2025, and the FIFA World Cup in 2022.

== Early life ==
Nayef Aguerd was born and raised in the city of Kenitra in north western Morocco.

Aguerd began his footballing career with the Mohammed VI Academy, before moving to FUS Rabat in 2014. The player then played a season with the club amateurs before signing his first professional contract with FUS Rabat in Botola in 2014.

== Club career ==
=== Early career ===
During his first season with FUS Rabat, he was the runner-up of the 2015 Throne cup after losing the final against Olympique de Khouribga. On 15 February 2015, he scored his first goal for the team in a 3–1 victory against Wydad AC. On 3 March, he scored his first continental goal in a 1–1 draw against UMS de Loum.

=== Dijon ===
After four seasons, he joined Dijon in Ligue 1. He made his professional debut with Dijon in a 4–0 win over Nice on 25 August 2018, scoring the first goal for his side on his debut.

=== Rennes ===
On 14 August 2020, Aguerd signed a contract with Ligue 1 team Rennes from Dijon for an undisclosed fee believed to be between €4m and €5m. He scored his first goal for the club in a friendly against Nice; the game ended in a 3–2 loss. On 13 September 2020, Aguerd scored his first league goal in a 4–2 victory against Nîmes.

On 17 May 2021, He was placed 11th place in the Prix Marc-Vivien Foé as the best player who represents an African national football team in Ligue 1. On 19 August 2021, Aguerd scored a header, which marked his first European goal, in a 2–0 victory against Rosenborg. A week later, Aguerd scored again in the second leg against Rosenborg in the 2021–22 UEFA Europa Conference League play-off round. On 16 May 2022, Aguerd was placed 3rd as the best African player in Ligue 1 for the Prix Marc-Vivien Foé.

=== West Ham United ===
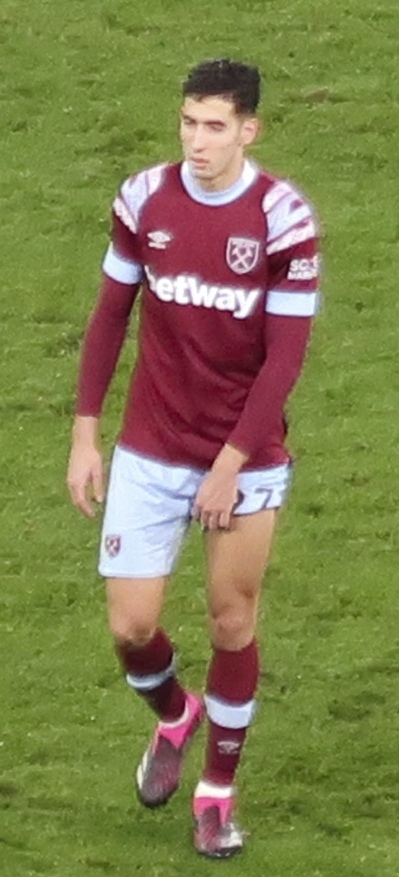
Aguerd with West Ham in 2023.

In June 2022, Aguerd signed for West Ham United on a five-year contract for a fee of £30 million. His fee was the fourth-highest paid by West Ham after those paid for Sébastien Haller, Felipe Anderson and Kurt Zouma. On 16 July, Aguerd made his debut for the Hammers in a friendly against Reading, playing a total of 63 minutes of a 1–1 draw at the Madejski Stadium. In his second game, a pre-season friendly against Rangers on 19 July, Aguerd injured his ankle which required surgery. On 19 October, Aguerd returned to training with the team three months after his injury. He made his competitive West Ham United debut on 27 October in a Europa Conference League game against Silkeborg, which West Ham won 1–0. On 2 April, Aguerd scored his first Premier League goal in the home encounter against Southampton, which ended in a 1–0 victory. On 7 June, Aguerd won his first major trophy for the club the 2022–23 UEFA Europa Conference League against Fiorentina, which ended in a 2–1 victory. He left the club in September 2025. He played 61 games in all competitions in his three seasons with West Ham.

==== Loan to Real Sociedad ====
On 30 August 2024, Aguerd was loaned to La Liga club Real Sociedad for the 2024–25 season.

=== Marseille ===
On 1 September 2025, Aguerd returned to Ligue 1, as he signed a contract with Marseille until 2030 for a fee reported to be "around €23 million". Later that month, on 12 September, he scored his first goal on his debut in the stoppage time of a 4–0 win over Lorient.

On 13 August 2026, Aguerd was close to returning to Real Sociedad on loan from Marseille with an option to buy, reportedly for a €4 million loan fee and an €11 million purchase option. He completed a medical ahead of the proposed move, but subsequently rejected the transfer following a conversation with Real Sociedad manager Pellegrino Matarazzo.

== International career ==
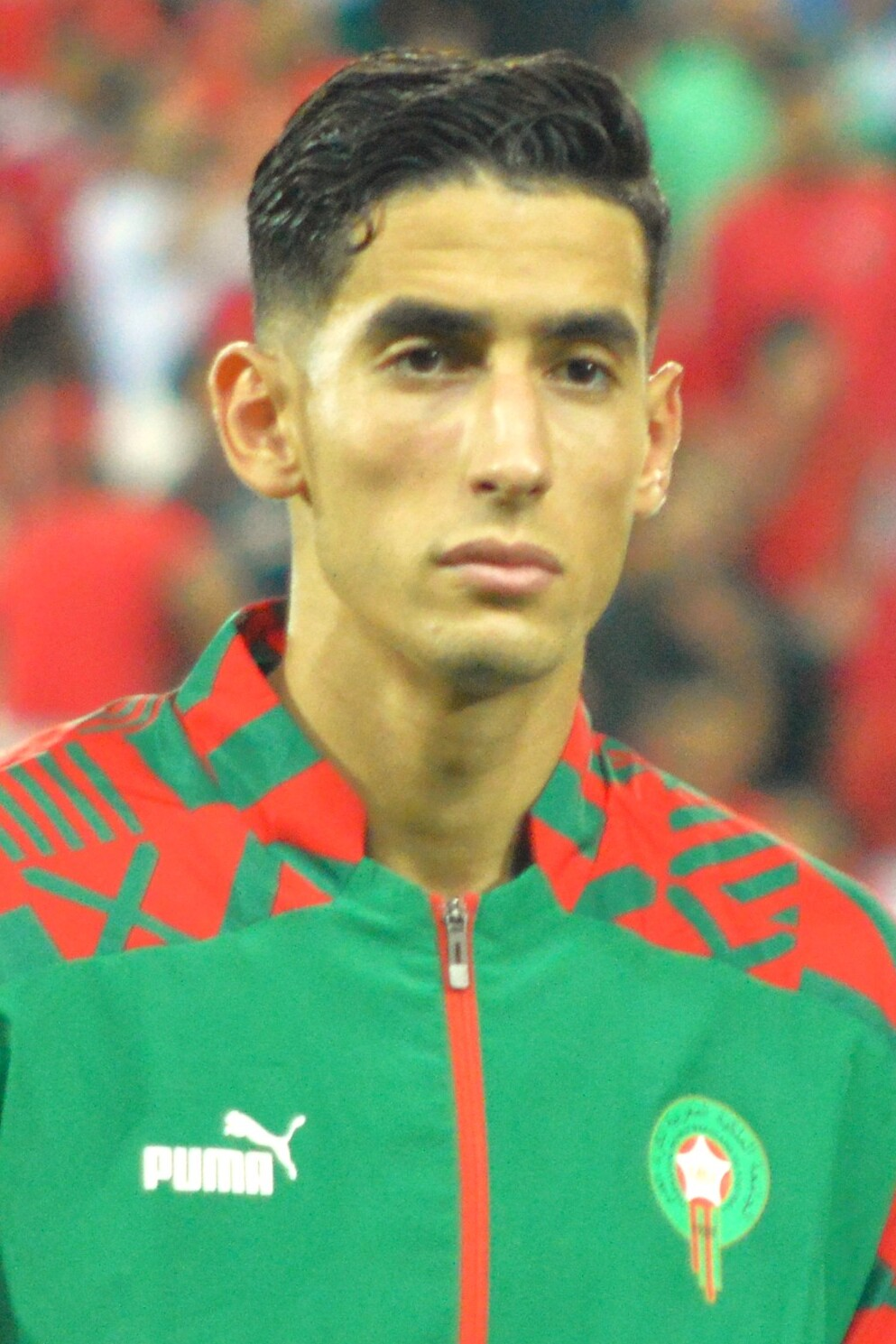
Aguerd with Morocco in 2023

Aguerd made his debut for the Morocco national team in a friendly 0–0 tie with Albania on 31 August 2016. Aguerd represented Morocco in the 2018 African Nations Championship, helping his country to achieve their first CHAN title. On 6 September 2021, Aguerd scored his first goal against Sudan in the 2022 FIFA World Cup qualification, he sent a sharp shot in the net from a cross.

He was later invited by Vahid Halilhodžić to represent Morocco in the 2021 Africa Cup of Nations. Nayef started all of the matches in the group stages and scored an own-goal in a 2–2 draw against Gabon.

On 10 November 2022, he was named in Morocco's 26-man squad for the 2022 FIFA World Cup in Qatar. Aguerd played all three group games and the Round of 16 match against Spain alongside Romain Saïss and Morocco conceded only once in those four matches, through an own goal by Aguerd. However, he missed both the quarter-final victory over Portugal through injury and then the decisive game against France due to illness – he was withdrawn minutes before kick-off in the semi-final, despite having been listed in the official starting line-ups.

On 28 December 2023, Aguerd was among the 27 players selected by coach Walid Regragui to represent Morocco in the 2023 Africa Cup of Nations.

On 11 December 2025, Aguerd was called up to the Morocco squad for the 2025 Africa Cup of Nations.

Aguerd was part of the national squad for the 2026 FIFA World Cup but on 11 June 2026 he was sent home after failing to recover from an injury.

== Personal life ==
On 9 September 2023, Aguerd along with his national teammates donated some of their blood for the needy affected by the 2023 Marrakesh-Safi earthquake.

== Career statistics ==
=== Club ===
As of match played 8 November 2026

Appearances and goals by club, season and competition
Club	Season	League			National cup (Note: Includes Moroccan Throne Cup, Coupe de France, FA Cup, Copa del Rey)		League cup (Note: Includes Coupe de la Ligue, EFL Cup)		Continental		Total	
Club	Season	Division	Apps	Goals	Apps	Goals	Apps	Goals	Apps	Goals	Apps	Goals
FUS Rabat	2014–15	Botola Pro	12	1	0	0	—		—		12	1
FUS Rabat	2015–16	Botola Pro	18	2	0	0	—		—		18	2
FUS Rabat	2016–17	Botola Pro	20	2	1	0	—		14 (Note: Two appearances and one goal in CAF Champions League, twelve appearances in CAF Confederations Cup)	1	35	3
FUS Rabat	2017–18	Botola Pro	23	0	0	0	—		—		23	0
FUS Rabat	Total		73	5	1	0	—		14	1	88	6
Dijon	2018–19	Ligue 1	13	3	3	0	1	0	—		17	3
Dijon	2019–20	Ligue 1	12	1	0	0	0	0	—		12	1
Dijon	Total		25	4	3	0	1	0	—		29	4
Rennes	2020–21	Ligue 1	35	3	1	0	—		4 (Note: Appearances in UEFA Champions League)	0	40	3
Rennes	2021–22	Ligue 1	31	2	0	0	—		9 (Note: Appearances in UEFA Europa Conference League)	2	40	4
Rennes	Total		66	5	1	0	—		13	2	80	7
West Ham United	2022–23	Premier League	18	2	3	0	1	0	8	0	30	2
West Ham United	2023–24	Premier League	21	1	0	0	1	0	6 (Note: Appearances in UEFA Europa League)	1	28	2
West Ham United	2025–26	Premier League	2	0	—		1	0	—		3	0
West Ham United	Total		41	3	3	0	3	0	14	1	61	4
Real Sociedad (loan)	2024–25	La Liga	21	0	4	0	—		11	0	36	0
Marseille	2025–26	Ligue 1	16	1	1	0	—		5	0	22	1
Marseille	2026–27	Ligue 1	10	0	0	0	—		4	0	14	0
Marseille	Total		26	1	1	0	—		9	0	36	1
Career total			253	18	13	0	4	0	65	4	332	23

=== International ===
As of match played 4 October 2026

Appearances and goals by national team and year
National team	Year	Apps	Goals
Morocco	2016	1	0
Morocco	2018	6	0
Morocco	2020	1	0
Morocco	2021	8	1
Morocco	2022	14	0
Morocco	2023	8	0
Morocco	2024	15	0
Morocco	2025	7	1
Morocco	2026	6	0
Total		66	2

Scores and results list Morocco's goal tally first.

List of international goals scored by Nayef Aguerd
No.	Date	Venue	Opponent	Score	Result	Competition
1	6 September 2021	Prince Moulay Abdellah Stadium, Rabat, Morocco	Sudan	1–0	2–0	2022 FIFA World Cup qualification
2	25 March 2025	Honor Stadium, Oujda, Morocco	Tanzania	1–0	2–0	2026 FIFA World Cup qualification

== Honours ==
FUS Rabat

- Botola Pro: 2015–16
- Moroccan Throne Cup: 2013–14; runner-up: 2014–15

West Ham United

- UEFA Europa Conference League: 2022–23

Morocco A'

- African Nations Championship: 2018

Morocco

- Africa Cup of Nations: 2025

Individual

- IFFHS CAF Men's Team of the Year: 2020
- UEFA Europa Conference League Team of the Season: 2022–23

Orders

- Order of the Throne: 2022
