= Oussama Haddadi =

Tunisian footballer (born 1992)

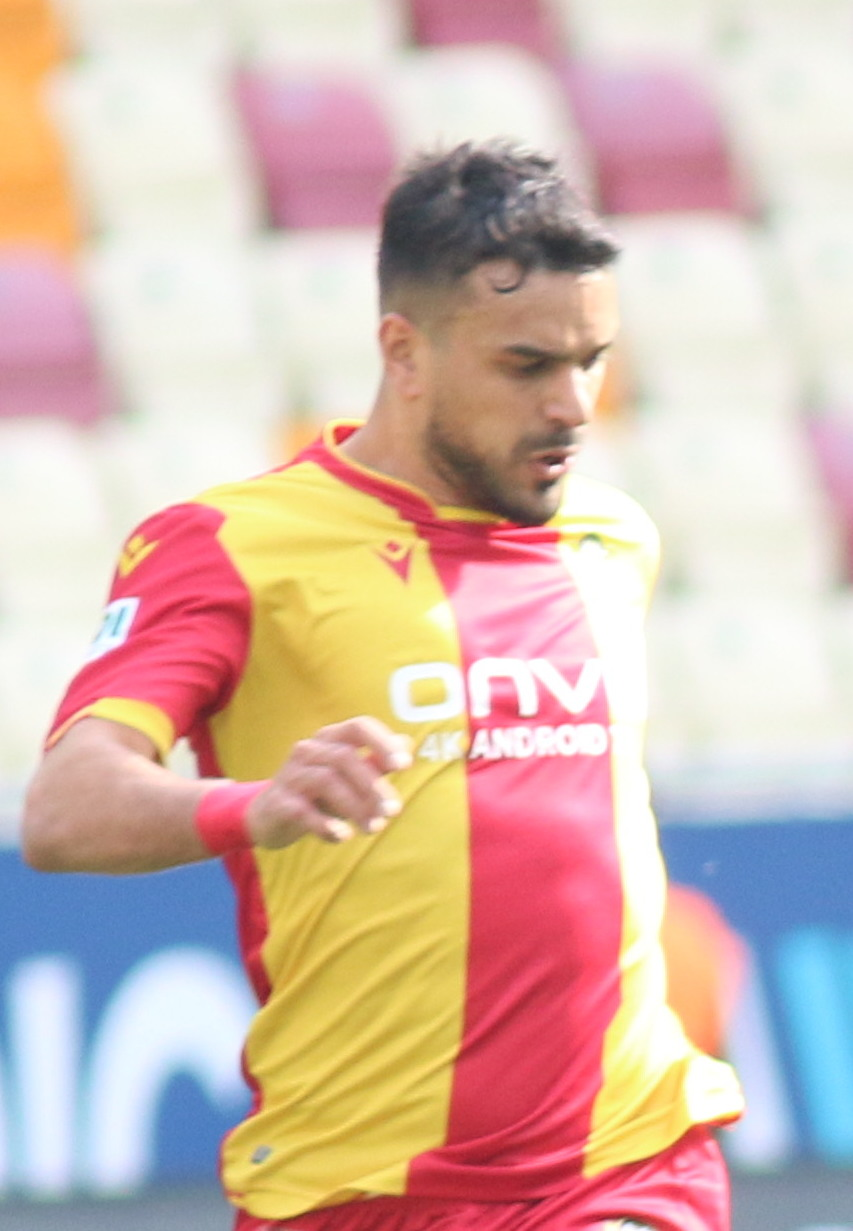
- Haddadi in 2022

Personal information
- Date of birth: 28 January 1992 (age 34)
- Place of birth: Tunis, Tunisia
- Height: 1.85 m (6 ft 1 in)
- Position: Left-back

Team information
- Current team: RS Berkane
- Number: 4

Senior career*
Years	Team	Apps	(Gls)
2010–2017	Club Africain	93	(2)
2017–2019	Dijon	78	(3)
2019–2021	Al-Ettifaq	14	(0)
2020–2021	→ Kasımpaşa (loan)	51	(0)
2021–2022	Yeni Malatyaspor	26	(0)
2022–2024	Greuther Fürth	59	(0)
2024–2025	Dibba Al-Hisn	26	(1)
2025–	RS Berkane	0	(0)

International career^{‡}
2015–	Tunisia	27	(0)
- * Club domestic league appearances and goals as of 23 May 2024 ‡ National team caps and goals as of 08:04, 29 June 2021 (UTC)

Oussama Haddadi (Arabic: أُسَامَة الْحَدَّادِيّ; born 28 January 1992) is a Tunisian professional footballer who plays as a left-back for RS Berkane and the Tunisia national team.

== Club career ==
On 30 January 2017, Haddadi joined Ligue 1 side Dijon, signing a 2 1/2-year contract with the club.

On 29 May 2019, Al-Ettifaq announced the signing of Haddadi from Dijon for the 2019–20 season having agreed a four-year contract.

On 21 January 2020, Al-Ettifaq announced that it loaned Haddadi for a year and a half to Kasımpaşa.

On 14 June 2022, Haddadi signed a two-year contract with Greuther Fürth in Germany.

== International career ==
On 27 March 2015, Haddadi made his international debut for Tunisia against Japan. In May 2018, he was named in Tunisia's 23-man squad for the 2018 FIFA World Cup in Russia. He was selected in the final 23.

== Career statistics ==
=== Club ===
As of match played on 12 November 2023

Appearances and goals by club, season and competition
Club	Season	League			National cup		League cup		Continental		Other		Total	
Club	Season	Division	Apps	Goals	Apps	Goals	Apps	Goals	Apps	Goals	Apps	Goals	Apps	Goals
Club Africain	2010–11	Tunisian Ligue Professionnelle 1	4	0	0	0	—		—		—		4	0
Club Africain	2011–12	Tunisian Ligue Professionnelle 1	17	1	0	0	—		—		—		17	1
Club Africain	2012–13	Tunisian Ligue Professionnelle 1	18	0	0	0	—		—		—		18	0
Club Africain	2013–14	Tunisian Ligue Professionnelle 1	14	0	2	0	—		—		—		16	0
Club Africain	2014–15	Tunisian Ligue Professionnelle 1	14	0	0	0	—		—		—		14	0
Club Africain	2015–16	Tunisian Ligue Professionnelle 1	14	1	4	0	—		2 (Note: Appearances in the CAF Champions League)	0	—		20	1
Club Africain	2016–17	Tunisian Ligue Professionnelle 1	12	0	2	0	—		—		—		14	0
Club Africain	Total		93	2	8	0	0	0	2	0	0	0	103	2
Dijon	2016–17	Ligue 1	13	0	0	0	0	0	—		—		13	0
Dijon	2017–18	Ligue 1	33	1	1	0	0	0	—		—		34	1
Dijon	2018–19	Ligue 1	32	2	3	0	2	0	—		2 (Note: Appearances in the 2018–19 Ligue 1 relegation play-offs)	0	39	2
Dijon	Total		78	3	4	0	2	0	0	0	2	0	86	3
Al-Ettifaq	2019–20	Saudi Pro League	14	0	4	1	—		—		—		18	1
Kasımpaşa (loan)	2019–20	Süper Lig	16	0	0	0	—		—		—		16	0
Kasımpaşa (loan)	2020–21	Süper Lig	35	0	2	0	—		—		—		37	0
Kasımpaşa (loan)	Total		51	0	2	0	0	0	0	0	0	0	53	0
Yeni Malatyaspor	2021–22	Süper Lig	26	0	2	0	—		—		—		28	0
Greuther Fürth	2022–23	2. Bundesliga	31	0	1	0	—		—		—		32	0
Greuther Fürth	2023–24	2. Bundesliga	10	0	1	0	—		—		—		11	0
Greuther Fürth	Total		41	0	2	0	0	0	0	0	0	0	43	0
Career total			303	5	22	1	2	0	2	0	2	0	331	6

=== International ===
As of 25 July 2019

Appearances and goals by national team and year
National team	Year	Apps	Goals
Tunisia	2015	1	0
Tunisia	2016	1	0
Tunisia	2017	2	0
Tunisia	2018	10	0
Tunisia	2019	9	0
Total		23	0

== Honours ==
Club Africain

- Tunisian Ligue Professionnelle 1: 2014–15
- Tunisian Cup: 2016–17

RS Berkane

- CAF Super Cup runner-up: 2025

Tunisia

- Africa Cup of Nations fourth place: 2019
