= Mehdi Abeid =

Algerian-French footballer (born 1992)

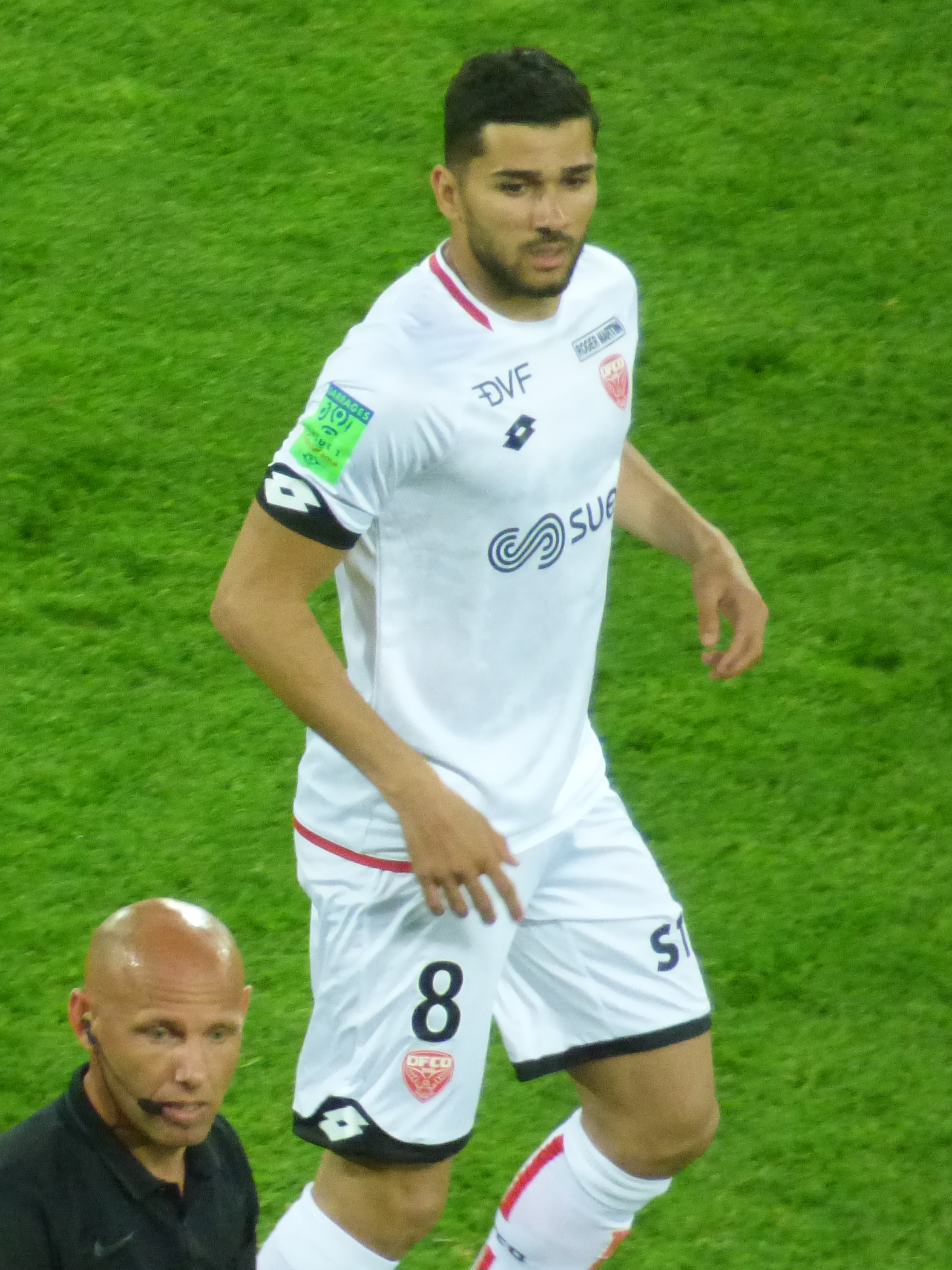
- Abeid in 2019

Personal information
- Full name: Mehdi Abeid
- Date of birth: 6 August 1992 (age 34)
- Place of birth: Montreuil, Seine-Saint-Denis, France
- Height: 1.78 m (5 ft 10 in)
- Position: Midfielder

Youth career
- 1999–2002: Thiais
- 2002–2003: US Alfortville
- 2003–2010: Lens

Senior career*
Years	Team	Apps	(Gls)
2010–2011	Lens II	12	(0)
2011–2015	Newcastle United	13	(0)
2013	→ St Johnstone (loan)	12	(0)
2013–2014	→ Panathinaikos (loan)	32	(9)
2015–2016	Panathinaikos	29	(3)
2016–2019	Dijon	73	(6)
2019–2021	Nantes	25	(1)
2021–2022	Al Nasr	29	(3)
2022–2023	Khor Fakkan	23	(3)
2023–2024	İstanbul Başakşehir	18	(3)
2024–2025	Al-Raed	30	(2)

International career^{‡}
2010	France U18	2	(0)
2011	Algeria U23	5	(0)
2015–2021	Algeria	19	(1)
Medal record
Men's football
Representing Algeria
Africa Cup of Nations
Winner	2019
- * Club domestic league appearances and goals as of 18 July 2026 ‡ National team caps and goals as of 20:30, 11 June 2021 (UTC)

Mehdi Abeid (Arabic: مهدي عبيد; born 6 August 1992) is a professional footballer who plays as a midfielder for the Algeria national team.

== Early life ==
Abeid was born in Montreuil, Seine-Saint-Denis, France, to Algerian parents from Aïn Témouchent, Algeria.

== Club career ==
=== Lens ===
Abeid joined RC Lens in 2003 and was part of the academy team for eight years before he left to join Newcastle United.

=== Newcastle United ===
Abeid joined Newcastle United on 25 May 2011, signing a five-year contract. Following his transfer, he stated:

"After eight fantastic years at Lens, I have stagnated. I needed a change of air. I am not afraid to leave for abroad, I have had contact dating back some time and I visited the facilities there last week. I even trained with the reserve team. The leaders of the club told me about their plans and that they will rely on me for next season. For my part, I intend to give everything to develop in the Premier League. I already discussed things with Cheick Tioté and they encouraged me and welcomed my signature".

Abeid made his debut for Newcastle United in a pre-season friendly against Darlington, which was followed by a pitch invasion, which caused the game to be delayed for ten minutes. On 20 September 2011, Abeid made his official debut for the club as a starter against Nottingham Forest in the third round of the 2011–12 Football League Cup. He scored his first goal in a 1–1 draw against Turkish side Fenerbahçe on 21 July 2012.

==== Loan to St Johnstone ====
On 31 January 2013, Abeid went on loan to Scottish Premier League side St Johnstone until the end of the season.

==== Loan to Panathinaikos ====
On 30 July 2013, Abeid signed a one-year loan deal with Panathinaikos. He scored his first goal in a match against Veria. He went on to help his team achieve third place, three points behind runners-up PAOK. He contributed with seven goals and five assists in 28 appearances, being the team's second-highest goalscorer of the season. On 26 April 2014, he helped Panathinaikos win the Greek Cup, their first since 2010. He then helped his team win the Greek play-offs for the Champions League by scoring two goals in four games.

==== Return to Newcastle United ====
On 1 November 2014, three years after he signed for the club, Abeid made his Premier League debut for Newcastle United, playing the full 90 minutes in a 1–0 home win over Liverpool. He suffered a fractured toe while on international duty with Algeria in mid-November.

=== Panathinaikos ===
On 18 August 2015, Abeid joined Panathinaikos for an undisclosed fee. His excellent performance during the season was a passport to be called up in Algeria squad ahead of African Cup qualifiers against Ethiopia on 25 and 29 March 2016.

=== Dijon ===
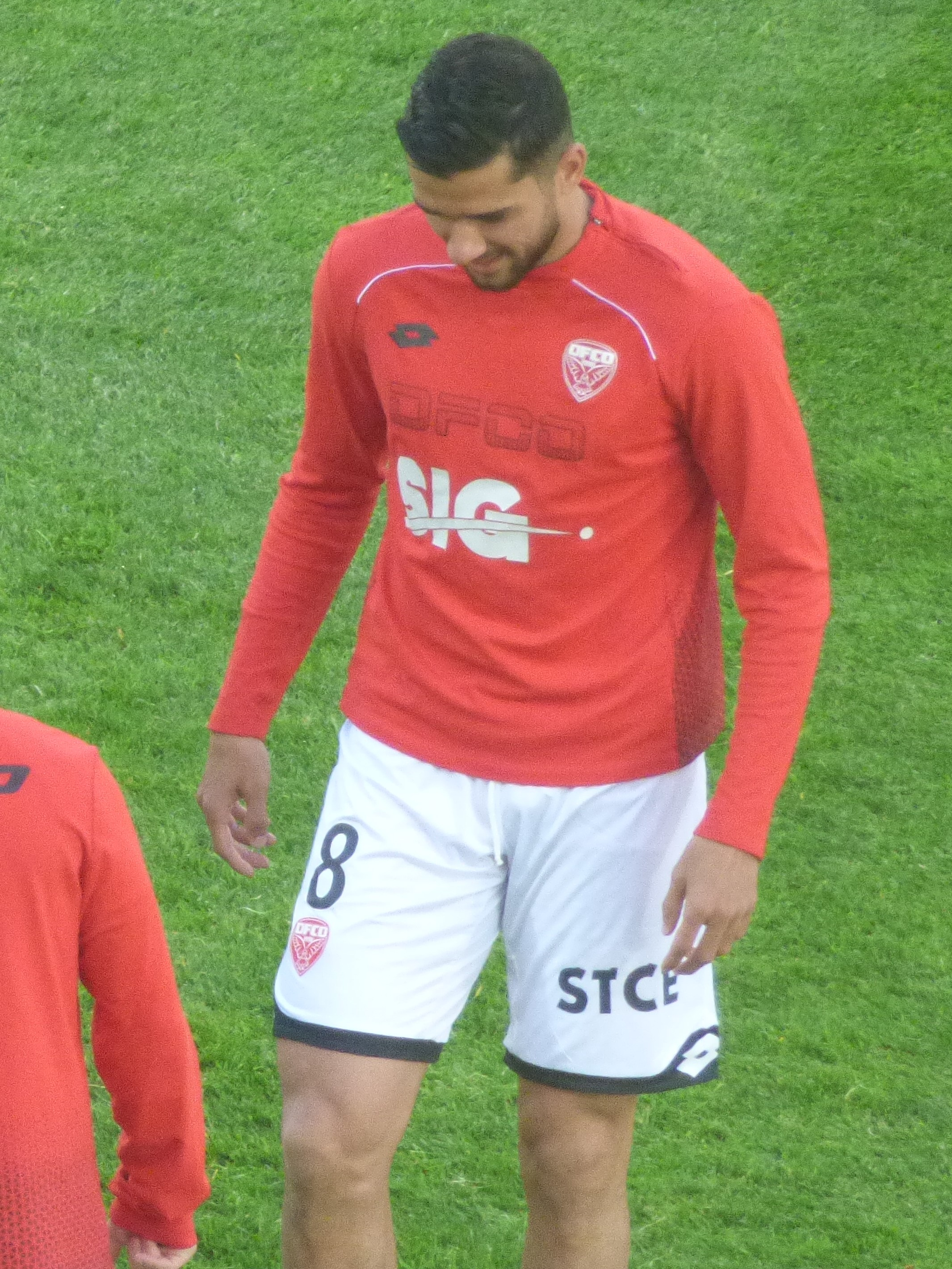
Abeid warming up for Dijon in 2019

On 30 August 2016, the second spell of Abeid with Panathinaikos was officially terminated, since the Algerian international central midfielder joined Dijon FCO. The 24-year-old former player of Newcastle United, who failed to repeat the impressive performances of 2013–14 season after his return to the Greens at summer of 2015 and was not in manager Andrea Stramaccioni's plans, signed a three-season contract with the French club, while Panathinaikos kept a percentage of his rights, in order to make some profit in case of a future transfer.

=== Nantes ===
In July 2019, Abeid joined Dijon's Ligue 1 rivals FC Nantes on a free transfer following the expiration of his Dijon contract. He reportedly agreed a three-year deal with Nantes.

=== Al-Nasr ===
In late January 2021, Abeid joined UAE Pro League club Al-Nasr for a fee of £1.35m.

=== İstanbul Başakşehir ===
On July 10, 2023, he signed a 2+1 year contract with Süper Lig club İstanbul Başakşehir.

=== Al-Raed ===
On 25 August 2024, Abeid joined Saudi Arabian club Al-Raed.

== International career ==
In 2009, Abeid was a member of the France national under-17 team at the 2009 UEFA European Under-17 Championship in Germany. He played in all three of France's group games, starting two of them. He has also been capped at the under-16 and under-18 levels.

In September 2011, Abeid said that he was considering an offer to switch allegiance and represent Algeria at under-23 level. On 30 September, sports daily Le Buteur announced that Abeid had spoken to Algeria's under-23 coach Azzedine Aït Djoudi and confirmed that he would be joining the team for a training camp in October. On 8 October, he started for the team in a friendly against USM Alger. On 13 November, he made his official debut as a starter in a 2–0 win against South Africa. On 16 November, he was selected as part of Algeria's squad for the 2011 CAF U-23 Championship in Morocco.

In November 2014, Abeid received his first international call-up to the senior team for the 2015 Africa Cup of Nations qualifiers against Ethiopia and Mali. A fractured toe ruled him out of selection for both games. In June 2015, he made his full international debut, coming on as a substitute for the last 5 minutes of a 2017 Africa Cup of Nations qualifier against Seychelles.

== Career statistics ==
=== Club ===
As of 27 July 2019

Appearances and goals by club, season and competition
Club	Season	League			National cup (Note: Includes FA Cup, Scottish FA Cup, Greek Cup)		League cup (Note: Includes Football League Cup, Coupe de la Ligue)		Other		Total	
Club	Season	Division	Apps	Goals	Apps	Goals	Apps	Goals	Apps	Goals	Apps	Goals
Lens II	2009–10	CFA	8	0	—		—		—		8	0
Lens II	2010–11	CFA	11	3	—		—		—		11	3
Lens II	Total		19	3	—		—		—		19	3
Newcastle United	2011–12	Premier League	0	0	1	0	1	0	—		2	0
Newcastle United	2012–13	Premier League	0	0	1	0	0	0	2 (Note: Appearances in UEFA Europa League)	0	3	0
Newcastle United	2014–15	Premier League	13	0	0	0	3	0	—		16	0
Newcastle United	Total		13	0	2	0	4	0	2	0	21	0
St Johnstone (loan)	2012–13	Scottish Premier League	12	0	1	0	0	0	0	0	13	0
Panathinaikos (loan)	2013–14	Super League Greece	28	7	6	1	—		4 (Note: Appearances in Super League Champions League play-offs)	2	38	10
Panathinaikos	2015–16	Super League Greece	24	3	6	1	—		5	0	35	4
Panathinaikos	Total		52	10	12	2	—		9	2	73	14
Dijon	2016–17	Ligue 1	28	3	0	0	0	0	–		28	3
Dijon	2017–18	Ligue 1	19	0	0	0	1	0	–		20	0
Dijon	2018–19	Ligue 1	26	3	1	0	0	0	2 (Note: Appearances in Ligue 1 relegation play-offs)	0	29	3
Dijon	Total		73	6	1	0	1	0	2	0	77	6
Nantes	2019–20	Ligue 1	25	1	2	1	2	1	–		29	3
Career total			194	20	18	3	7	1	13	2	232	26

=== International ===
As of match played 12 June 2021

Appearances and goals by national team and year
National team	Year	Apps	Goals
Algeria	2015	2	0
Algeria	2016	1	0
Algeria	2017	2	0
Algeria	2019	8	1
Algeria	2020	3	0
Algeria	2021	3	0
Total		19	1

Scores and results list Algeria's goal tally first, score column indicates score after each Abeid goal.

List of international goals scored by Mehdi Abeid
No.	Date	Venue	Opponent	Score	Result	Competition
1	22 March 2019	Mustapha Tchaker Stadium, Blida, Algeria	Gambia	1–0	1–1	2019 Africa Cup of Nations qualification

== Honours ==
Panathinaikos

- Greek Cup: 2013–14

Algeria

- Africa Cup of Nations: 2019
