= Erwan Maury =

French footballer (born 1996)

Personal information
- Date of birth: 16 June 1996 (age 30)
- Place of birth: Colmar, France
- Height: 1.83 m (6 ft 0 in)
- Position: Midfielder

Senior career*
Years	Team	Apps	(Gls)
2014–2018	Dijon B	52	(4)
2015–2018	Dijon	4	(0)
2016–2017	→ Quevilly-Rouen B (loan)	11	(0)
2018–2020	Rodez	26	(1)
2018–2020	Rodez B	10	(1)
2020–2021	Concarneau	2	(0)
- * Club domestic league appearances and goals as of 15 May 2021

Erwan Maury (born 16 June 1996) is a French former professional footballer who plays as a midfielder. He previously represented both Rodez and Dijon in Ligue 2
