= Adrián Sahibeddine =

French footballer (born 1994)

Personal information
- Full name: Adrián Luciano Santos Sahibeddine
- Date of birth: 19 August 1994 (age 32)
- Place of birth: Bordeaux, France
- Height: 1.79 m (5 ft 10 in)
- Position: Midfielder

Team information
- Current team: Bordeaux B

Youth career
- 2001–2002: Gradignan FC
- 2002–2006: RC Bordeaux
- 2010–2011: FCE Mérignac-Arlac
- 2011–2012: Colo-Colo

Senior career*
Years	Team	Apps	(Gls)
2012–2015	Colo-Colo B	5	(1)
2015–2017	FCE Mérignac-Arlac	40	(11)
2017–2018	Dijon II	22	(9)
2018	Dijon	3	(0)
2018	Stade Bordelais	9	(1)
2019–2020	FCE Mérignac-Arlac	18	(5)
2020	Vevey United		
2021–2022	Bergerac Périgord	22	(3)
2022–2024	Stade Bordelais	30	(3)
2024–2025	Louhans-Cuiseaux	17	(3)
2025–	Bordeaux B	0	(0)
- * Club domestic league appearances and goals as of 10 July 2025

Adrián Luciano Santos Sahibeddine (born 19 August 1994), known as Adrián Sahibeddine, is a French-Chilean professional footballer who plays as a midfielder for French club Bordeaux B.

== Professional career ==
Sahibeddine began playing football with his local sides Gradignan FC and RC Bordeaux before taking a four-year break to focus on his studies. He joined FCE Mérignac-Arlac's academy in 2010, and after a couple years his Chilean mother connected him with her cousin who worked for the Chilean club Colo-Colo. He signed with Colo-Colo, but was plagued by injuries and homesickness, and declined professional contract to return to France.

After four months of not playing, he re-signed with Mérignac Arlac in the Division d'Honneur (the sixth division of France). In his first match against Sarlat FC, Sahibeddine ruptured ligaments in his knee and ankle and was out for 5 months. He finished the last 7 games of the season with Arlac and barely missed promotion, and Sahibeddine was convinced by his coach Antoine Vergès to remain another year. The following season, Sahibeddine helped Arlac get promoted to the Championnat National 3, finishing as one of the top scorers with 11 goals in 33 games.

After his success with Merlac, Ligue 1 club Dijon offered Sahibeddine a trial and was subsequently offered a one-year contract. Sahibeddine joined the reserve side of Dijon, with the goal of getting into the first-team in the summer of 2017. After success with Dijon's reserve side, Sahibeddine made his professional debut with the senior Dijon team in a 3–1 Ligue 1 loss to Bordeaux on 28 April 2018.

In July 2022, Sahibeddine rejoined Stade Bordelais after his stint with them in 2018. In July 2024, he switched to Louhans-Cuiseaux.

== Personal life ==
Sahibeddine was born in Bordeaux, France to a Brazilian father, and a Chilean mother of Moroccan descent. As such, he is available to represent Morocco, Chile, Brazil and France. He holds Chilean nationality by descent.
