= Júlio Tavares =

Cape Verdean footballer (born 1988)

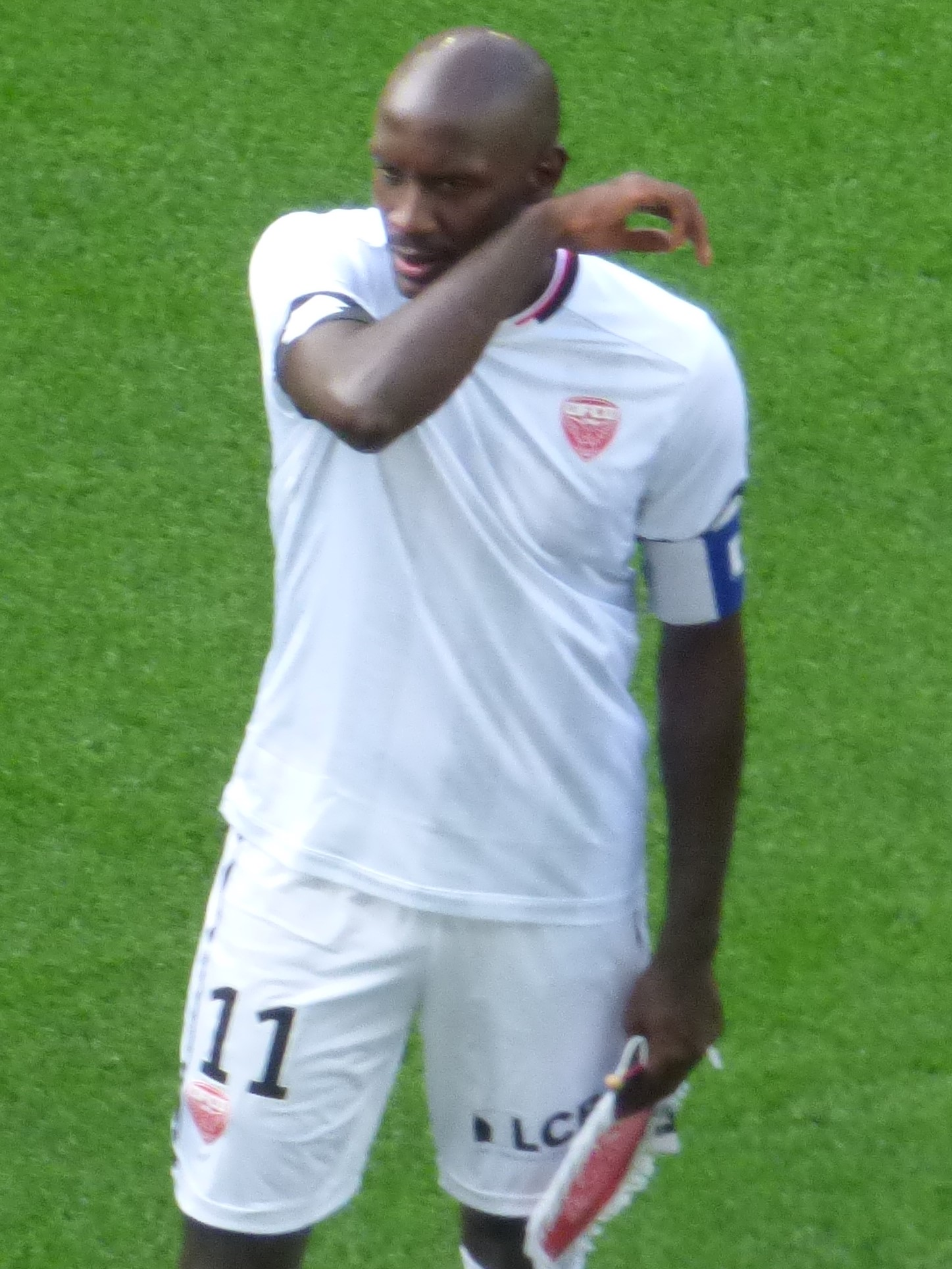
- Tavares with Dijon in 2020

Personal information
- Full name: Júlio Carolino Tavares
- Date of birth: 19 November 1988 (age 37)
- Place of birth: Tarrafal, Cape Verde
- Height: 1.87 m (6 ft 2 in)
- Position: Striker

Team information
- Current team: Dijon
- Number: 11

Youth career
- 2006–2008: AS Montréal-la-Cluse
- 2008–2009: Bourg-Péronnas

Senior career*
Years	Team	Apps	(Gls)
2009–2012	Bourg-Péronnas	95	(40)
2012–2020	Dijon	243	(69)
2020–2022	Al-Faisaly	57	(24)
2022–2024	Al-Raed	56	(15)
2024–2025	Al-Diriyah	21	(8)
2025–	Dijon	28	(3)

International career
2012–2022	Cape Verde	46	(7)
- * Club domestic league appearances and goals as of 22 June 2026

Júlio Tavares (born 19 November 1988) is a Cape Verdean professional footballer who plays as a striker for French Ligue 2 club Dijon.

== Club career ==
=== Dijon ===
On 28 October 2017, Tavares became Dijon's all time leading goal scorer after heading in the only goal in the 1–0 Ligue 1 home victory over Nantes; it was his 56th goal for Dijon in all competitions and broke the previous Dijon record of 55 goals scored in all competitions held by Sebastián Ribas. On 18 November 2017.Tavares scored twice in the 3–1 Ligue 1 home win over Troyes, it was the first Ligue 1 brace of his career and his second goal was the 100th Ligue 1 goal scored by Dijon, playing in just their third season in Ligue 1. On 10 February 2018, Tavares scored twice as Dijon came from behind to beat OGC Nice 3–2 in a home Ligue 1 match; his brace brought his 2017–18 Ligue 1 goal tally to 9 in 15 matches, as many as he had scored in 35 Ligue 1 matches during the entire 2016–17 season.

=== Al-Faisaly ===
On 14 September 2020, Tavares signed with Saudi Professional League club Al-Faisaly.

=== Al-Raed ===
On 25 July 2022, Tavares joined Al-Raed on a free transfer.

=== Al-Diriyah ===
On 19 July 2024, Tavares joined Saudi Second Division League club Al-Diriyah.

== International career ==
In 2013, he played in all matches at 2013 Africa Cup of Nations, where his team advanced to the quarterfinals, in the best result in the history of the national team.

== Career statistics ==
=== Club ===
As of 26 October 2024

Appearances and goals by club, season and competition
Club	Season	League			National cup (Note: Includes Coupe de France, King Cup)		League cup (Note: Includes Coupe de la Ligue)		Continental		Total	
Club	Season	Division	Apps	Goals	Apps	Goals	Apps	Goals	Apps	Goals	Apps	Goals
Bourg-Péronnas	2009–10	CFA	28	8	0	0	0	0	—		28	8
Bourg-Péronnas	2010–11	CFA	31	14	1	1	0	0	—		32	15
Bourg-Péronnas	2011–12	CFA	31	16	4	1	0	0	—		35	17
Bourg-Péronnas	Total		90	38	5	2	0	0	0	0	95	40
Dijon	2012–13	Ligue 2	26	10	1	1	2	1	—		29	12
Dijon	2013–14	Ligue 2	27	7	2	1	1	0	—		30	8
Dijon	2014–15	Ligue 2	33	10	2	1	2	0	—		37	11
Dijon	2015–16	Ligue 2	37	11	1	1	2	1	—		40	13
Dijon	2016–17	Ligue 1	35	9	1	1	1	0	—		37	10
Dijon	2017–18	Ligue 1	26	12	1	1	1	0	—		28	13
Dijon	2018–19	Ligue 1	36	5	4	3	2	0	—		42	8
Dijon	2019–20	Ligue 1	23	5	2	0	1	0	—		26	5
Dijon	Total		243	69	14	9	12	2	0	0	269	80
Al-Faisaly	2020–21	SPL	30	15	4	4	—		—		34	19
Al-Faisaly	2021–22	SPL	27	9	1	0	1 (Note: Appearance in Saudi Super Cup)	0	5 (Note: Appearances in AFC Champions League)	2	34	11
Al-Faisaly	Total		57	24	5	4	1	0	5	2	68	30
Al-Raed	2022–23	SPL	27	8	1	0	—		—		28	8
Al-Raed	2023–24	SPL	29	7	0	0	—		—		29	7
Al-Raed	Total		56	15	1	0	—		—		57	15
Career total			446	145	25	15	13	2	5	2	489	165

=== International ===
Scores and results list Cape Verde's goal tally first.

No.	Date	Venue	Opponent	Score	Result	Competition
1.	18 November 2014	Estádio Nacional de Cabo Verde, Praia, Cape Verde	Niger	3–1	3–1	2015 Africa Cup of Nations qualification
2.	13 June 2015	Estádio Nacional de Cabo Verde, Praia, Cape Verde	São Tomé and Príncipe	7–1	7–1	2017 Africa Cup of Nations qualification
3.	28 March 2017	Stade Alphonse Theis, Hesperange, Luxembourg	Luxembourg	2–0	2–0	Friendly
4.	1 June 2018	July 5, 1962 Stadium, Algiers, Algeria	Algeria	3–2	3–2	Friendly
5.	1 September 2021	Stade de la Réunification, Douala, Cameroon	Central African Republic	1–0	1–1	2022 FIFA World Cup qualification
6.	13 November 2021	Estádio Municipal Adérito Sena, Mindelo, Cape Verde	Central African Republic	1–1	2–1	2022 FIFA World Cup qualification
7.	9 January 2022	Olembe Stadium, Yaoundé, Cameroon	Ethiopia	1–0	1–0	2021 Africa Cup of Nations
8.	7 June 2022	Marrakesh Stadium, Marrakesh, Morocco	Togo	1–0	2–0	2023 Africa Cup of Nations qualification

== Honours ==
Al-Faisaly

- King's Cup: 2020–21

Individual

- King's Cup Top goalscorer: 2020–21
