= Bobby Allain =

French footballer (born 1991)

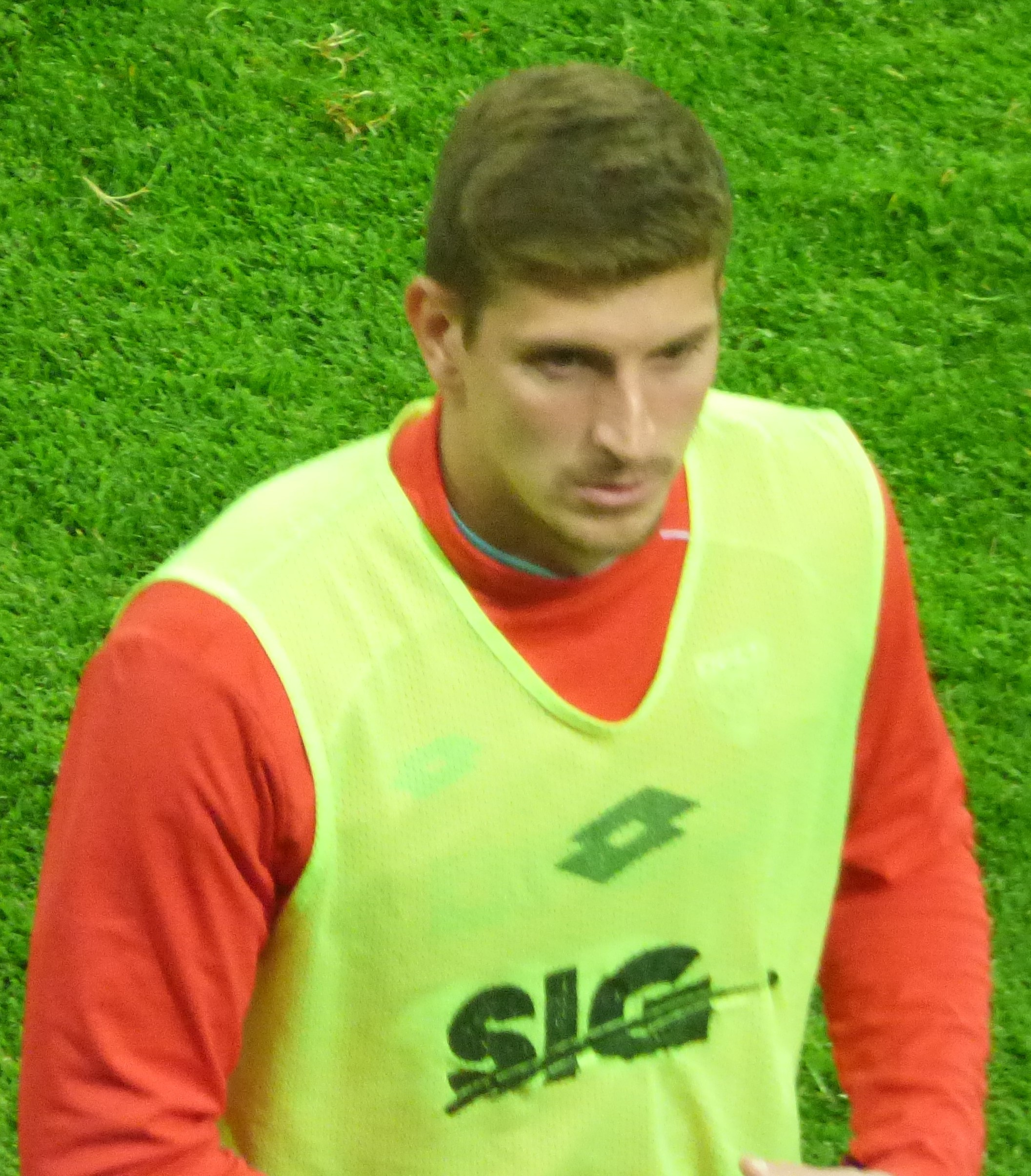
- Allain in 2019

Personal information
- Date of birth: 28 November 1991 (age 34)
- Place of birth: Clamart, France
- Height: 1.85 m (6 ft 1 in)
- Position: Goalkeeper

Team information
- Current team: Grenoble
- Number: 16

Youth career
- 2005–2010: Montrouge FC
- 2009–2010: ACBB
- 2010–2011: Clyde

Senior career*
Years	Team	Apps	(Gls)
2011	Ivry	3	(0)
2011–2016	Red Star	11	(0)
2016–2019	Dijon II	45	(0)
2018–2019	Dijon	13	(0)
2019–2020	Olympiacos	3	(0)
2021	Örebro SK	23	(0)
2022	Dalkurd	13	(0)
2022–2023	Gazélec Ajaccio	12	(0)
2023	Ionikos	0	(0)
2023–	Grenoble	11	(0)
- * Club domestic league appearances and goals as of 12 May 2026

Bobby Allain (born 28 November 1991) is a French professional footballer who plays as a goalkeeper for Ligue 2 club Grenoble. He has previously played in France for Ivry, Red Star and Dijon.

== Career ==
Allain signed his first professional contract with Clyde in Scotland, where he played in the under-19 team. He returned to France, and began playing senior football with Ivry and Red Star, before moving to Dijon in 2016.

Allain spent a couple of years as the backup goalkeeper at Dijon. He made his professional debut with Dijon in a 3–1 Coupe de la Ligue win over Caen on 31 October 2018.

On 24 July 2019, Greek Super League side Olympiacos announced the signing of Allain on a two-year contract.

On 28 December 2020, it was announced that Örebro SK, of Sweden's top division Allsvenskan, had signed Bobby on a two-year deal.

In August 2022 it was announced that he had signed for Gazélec Ajaccio.

== Personal life ==
Allain was born in France, and is of Scottish descent through his mother. His uncle Xavier Perez was the goalkeeper for Red Star in the 1980s.

Both of Allain's parents are deaf, and he is fluent in sign language. In his spare time he is the goalkeeper coach for France's deaf football team.

== Honours ==
Olympiacos

- Super League Greece: 2019–20
- Greek Cup: 2019–20
