= Vincent Rüfli =

Swiss footballer (born 1988)

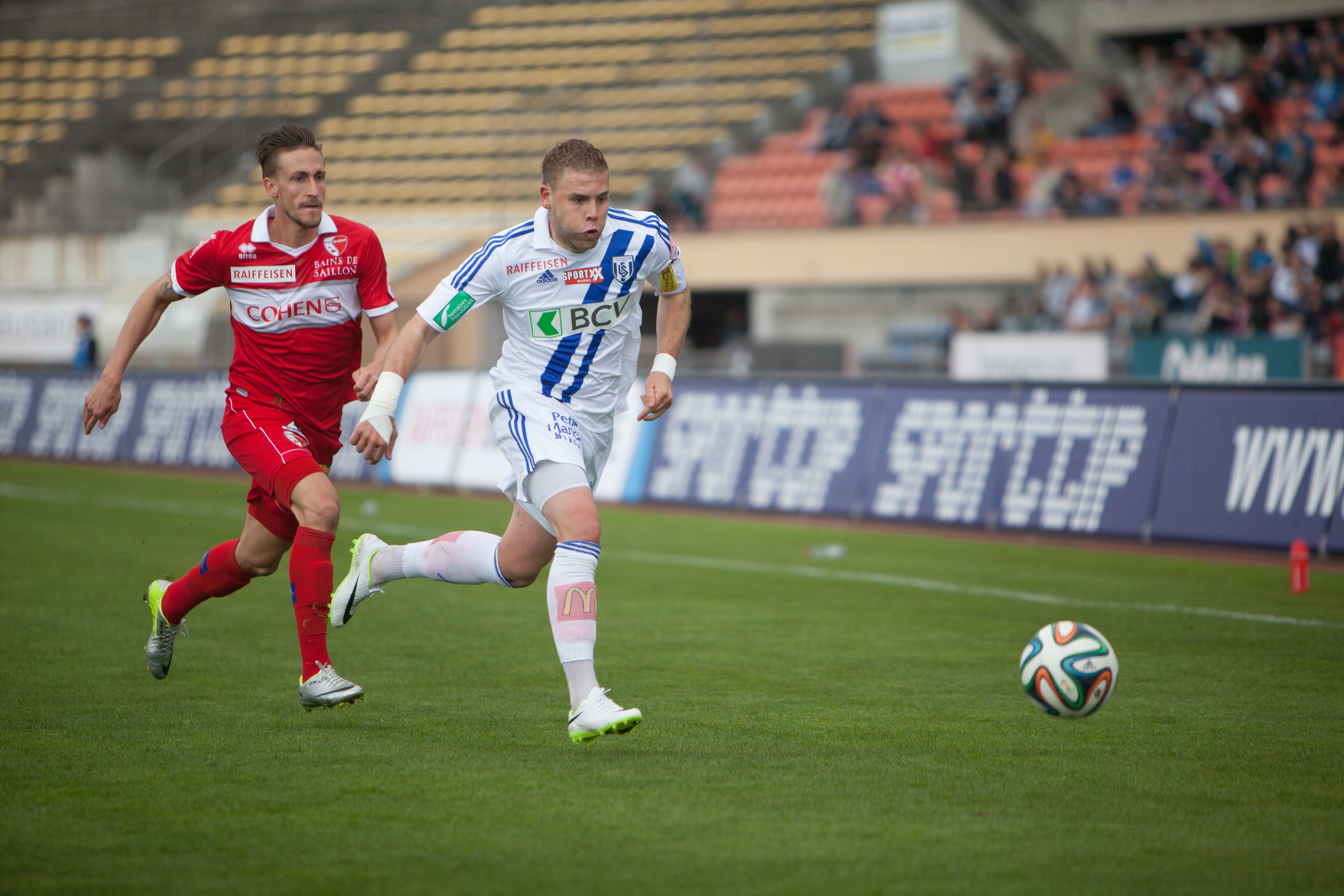
- Vincent Rüfli and Yoric Ravet (2014)

Personal information
- Date of birth: 22 January 1988 (age 38)
- Place of birth: Carouge, Switzerland
- Height: 1.80 m (5 ft 11 in)
- Position: Right back

Team information
- Current team: FC Grand-Saconnex

Senior career*
Years	Team	Apps	(Gls)
2006–2008	Étoile Carouge	46	(2)
2008–2013	Servette	79	(9)
2013–2016	Sion	84	(1)
2016–2018	Dijon	22	(0)
2018–2019	Paris FC	17	(1)
2019–2021	St. Gallen	24	(1)
2021	→ Lausanne Ouchy (loan)	14	(0)
2021–2022	Lausanne Ouchy	13	(0)
2022	→ Étoile Carouge (loan)	8	(0)
2022	Étoile Carouge	12	(1)
2023–2026	Étoile Carouge	74	(11)
2026–	FC Grand-Saconnex	0	(0)

International career
2011	Switzerland	1	(0)
- * Club domestic league appearances and goals as of 19 September 2026

Vincent Rüfli (born 22 January 1988) is a Swiss professional footballer who plays for Swiss Promotion League club FC Grand-Saconnex as a right back.

== Career ==
On 3 June 2019, Rüfli signed a three-year contract with St. Gallen and got shirt number 99.

On 15 January 2021, he joined Lausanne Ouchy on loan, and then transferred to the club on a permanent basis on 14 July 2021.

Vincent left Carouge during the winter break of the 2022-2023 season, but in August 2023, Rüfli signed a contract with Carouge again.
