= Cédric Varrault =

French footballer (born 1980)

Personal information
- Date of birth: 30 January 1980 (age 46)
- Place of birth: Blois, France
- Height: 1.82 m (6 ft 0 in)
- Position: Centre back

Youth career
- Rapid de Menton

Senior career*
Years	Team	Apps	(Gls)
1999–2007	Nice	208	(4)
2007–2010	Saint-Étienne	75	(2)
2010–2011	Panionios	12	(0)
2011–2018	Dijon	175	(11)
2018–2019	Saint-Jean Beaulieu FC	9	(1)
Total		479	(18)
- * Club domestic league appearances and goals

Cédric Varrault (born 30 January 1980) is a French former professional footballer who plays as a centre back.

== Honours ==
Nice

- Coupe de la Ligue runners-up: 2006
