= Fouad Chafik =

French-Moroccan footballer (born 1986)

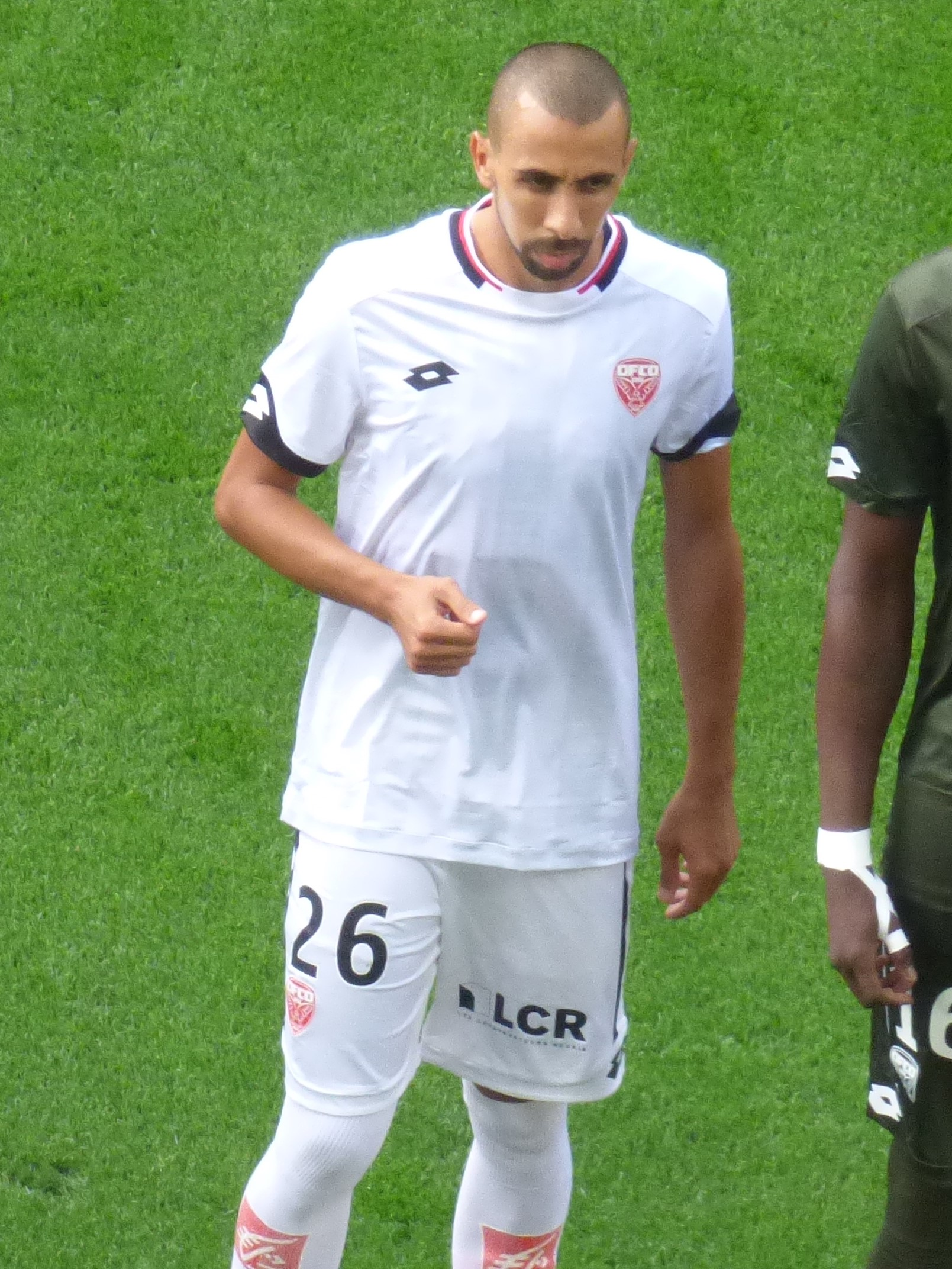
- Chafik with Dijon in 2020

Personal information
- Date of birth: 16 October 1986 (age 40)
- Place of birth: Pierrelatte, France
- Height: 1.83 m (6 ft 0 in)
- Position: Defender

Senior career*
Years	Team	Apps	(Gls)
2004–2009	UPMF Grenoble Université		
2009–2010	Montélimar		
2010–2012	Valence	41	(6)
2012–2014	Istres	73	(1)
2014–2016	Laval	66	(2)
2016–2021	Dijon	113	(1)
2021–2022	Lausanne-Sport	25	(0)
Total		318	(10)

International career
2015–2020	Morocco	12	(0)
- * Club domestic league appearances and goals

Fouad Chafik (born 16 October 1986) is a former professional footballer who played as a defender. Born in France, he made 12 appearances for the Morocco national team.

== Club career ==
In June 2016, Chafik joined Dijon, newly promoted to Ligue 1, on a two-year contract from Laval.

On 31 August 2021, he moved to Switzerland and signed with Lausanne-Sport.

== International career ==
Born in France, Chafik was called up for the Morocco national team for the first time in May 2015. He made his debut for the Moroccan squad against Libya in a qualifying match for the African Cup of Nations 2017.
