= Wesley Lautoa =

New Caledonian footballer (born 1987

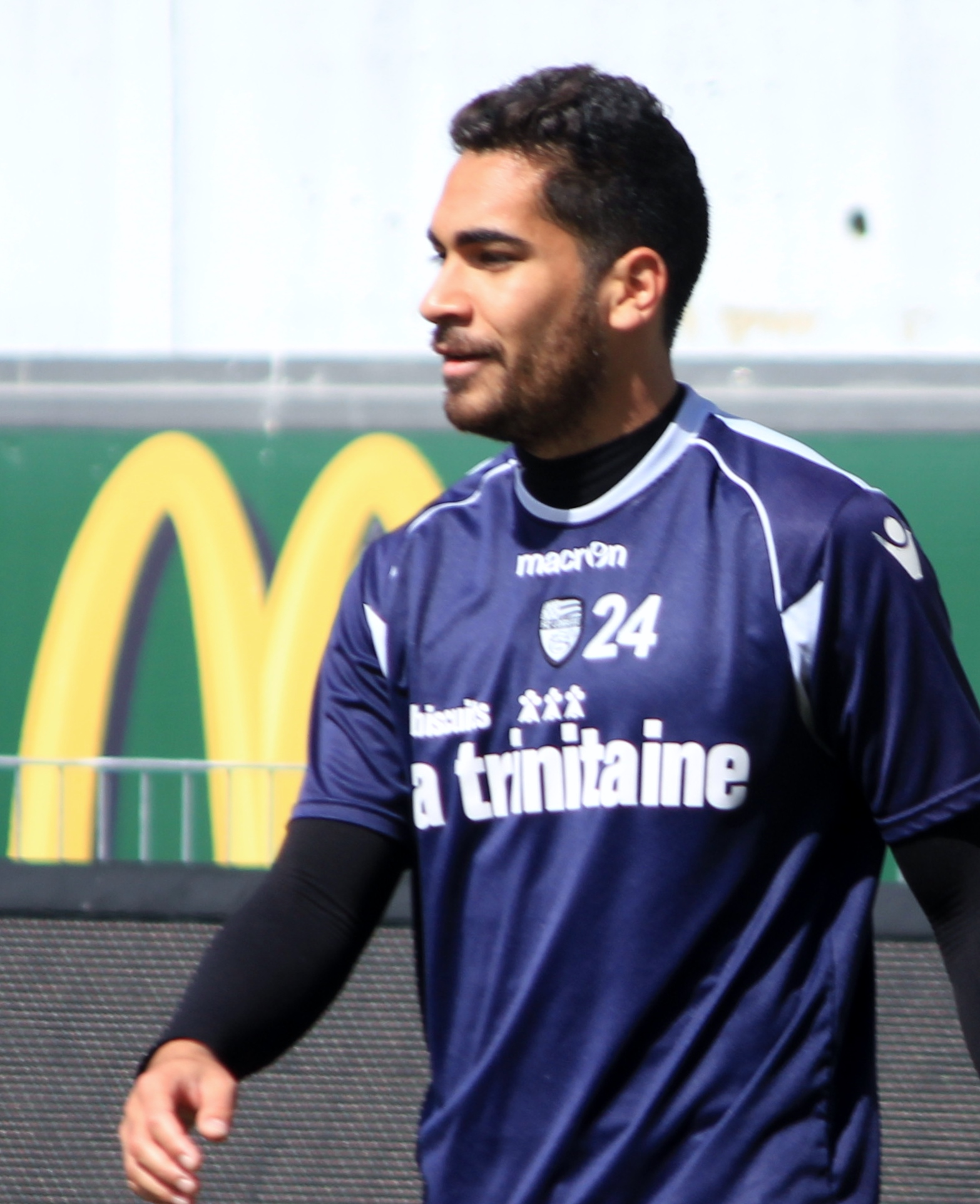
- Lautoa in 2013

Personal information
- Date of birth: 25 August 1987 (age 39)
- Place of birth: Épernay, France
- Height: 1.82 m (6 ft 0 in)
- Positions: Defender; midfielder

Youth career
- 1997–2003: Épernay Champagne
- 2003–2004: Sannois Saint-Gratien

Senior career*
| Years | Team | Apps | (Gls) |
| 2004–2008 | Épernay Champagne | 72 | (3) |
| 2008–2010 | Compiègne | 53 | (1) |
| 2010–2012 | Sedan | 54 | (1) |
| 2012–2017 | Lorient | 126 | (4) |
| 2017–2021 | Dijon | 92 | (0) |
- * Club domestic league appearances and goals as of 23 May 2021

Wesley Lautoa (born 25 August 1987) is a New Caledonian former professional footballer who played as a defender and midfielder. He is of New Caledonian and Wallisian descent.

== Club career ==
Born in Épernay, Lautoa began his career in the youth sides of local club RC Épernay Champagne before playing in the youth of L'Entente SSG for one year. In 2004, he returned to RC Épernay Champagne where he earned his first professional caps. After four years with the first team he left the club to join AFC Compiègne. On 26 April 2010, CS Sedan signed the defender from French amateur club Compiègne on a three-year deal.

In July 2017 Lautoa joined Dijon from Lorient.

== International career ==
In February 2022, Lautoa was called up with the New Caledonia national team, to play in the qualifiers for the 2022 World Cup.
