= Olivier Dall'Oglio =

French footballer and manager (born 1964)

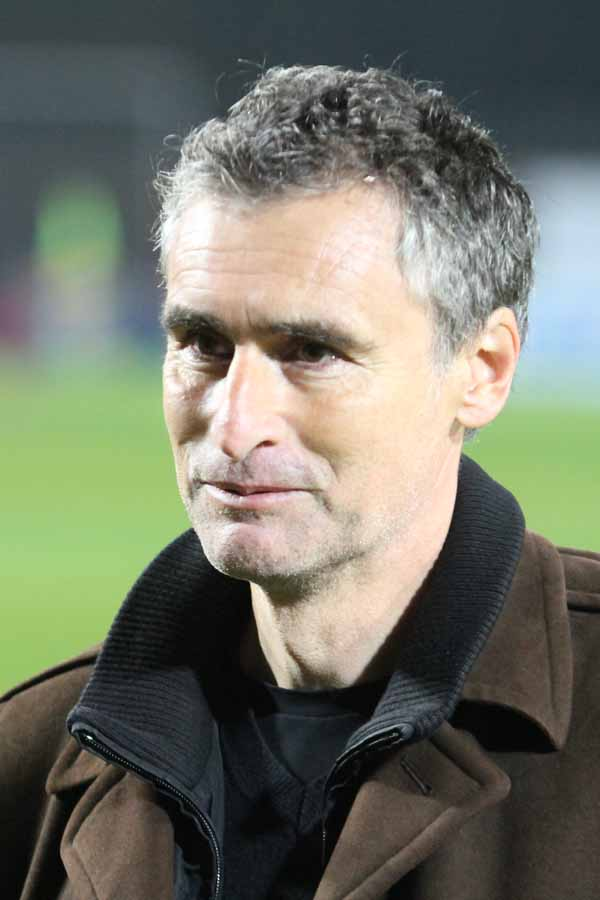
- Dall'Oglio in 2015

Personal information
- Date of birth: 16 May 1964 (age 62)
- Place of birth: Alès, France
- Height: 1.76 m (5 ft 9 in)
- Position: Defender

Senior career*
Years	Team	Apps	(Gls)
1982–1989	Alès	197	(4)
1989–1992	Strasbourg	64	(0)
1992–1993	Perpignan	32	(1)
1993–1996	Rennes	50	(0)
Total		343	(5)

Managerial career
- 2007–2008: Alès
- 2012–2018: Dijon
- 2019–2021: Brest
- 2021–2022: Montpellier
- 2023–2024: Saint-Étienne
- * Club domestic league appearances and goals

Olivier Dall'Oglio (born 16 May 1964) is a French professional football manager and former player who was most recently manager of Ligue 1 side Saint-Étienne.

== Early life ==
Dall'Oglio was born in Alès, Gard.

== Managerial career ==
On 1 June 2012, Dall'Oglio was named manager of Dijon. He helped the team getting promoted to the first division and kept them in Ligue 1. He is considered as the best coach the club has ever had. He later moved to Brest, before joining Montpellier in June 2021.

On 12 December 2023 AS Saint-Étienne signed Olivier Dall'Oglio until the end of the 2023-2024 season. On 14 December 2024, the club announced that they ended this collaboration.

== Managerial statistics ==
As of match played on 13 December 2024

Managerial record by team and tenure
Team	From	To	Record							
Team	From	To	G	W	D	L	GF	GA	GD	Win %
Dijon	1 June 2012	31 December 2018	273	101	80	92	392	366	+26	37.00
Brest	26 May 2019	1 June 2021	72	21	19	32	91	113	−22	29.17
Montpellier	1 June 2021	17 October 2022	52	18	8	26	73	84	−11	34.62
Saint-Étienne	12 December 2023	14 December 2024	39	18	7	14	49	50	−1	46.15
Total			436	158	114	164	605	613	−8	36.24
