= Jordan Marié =

French footballer (born 1991)

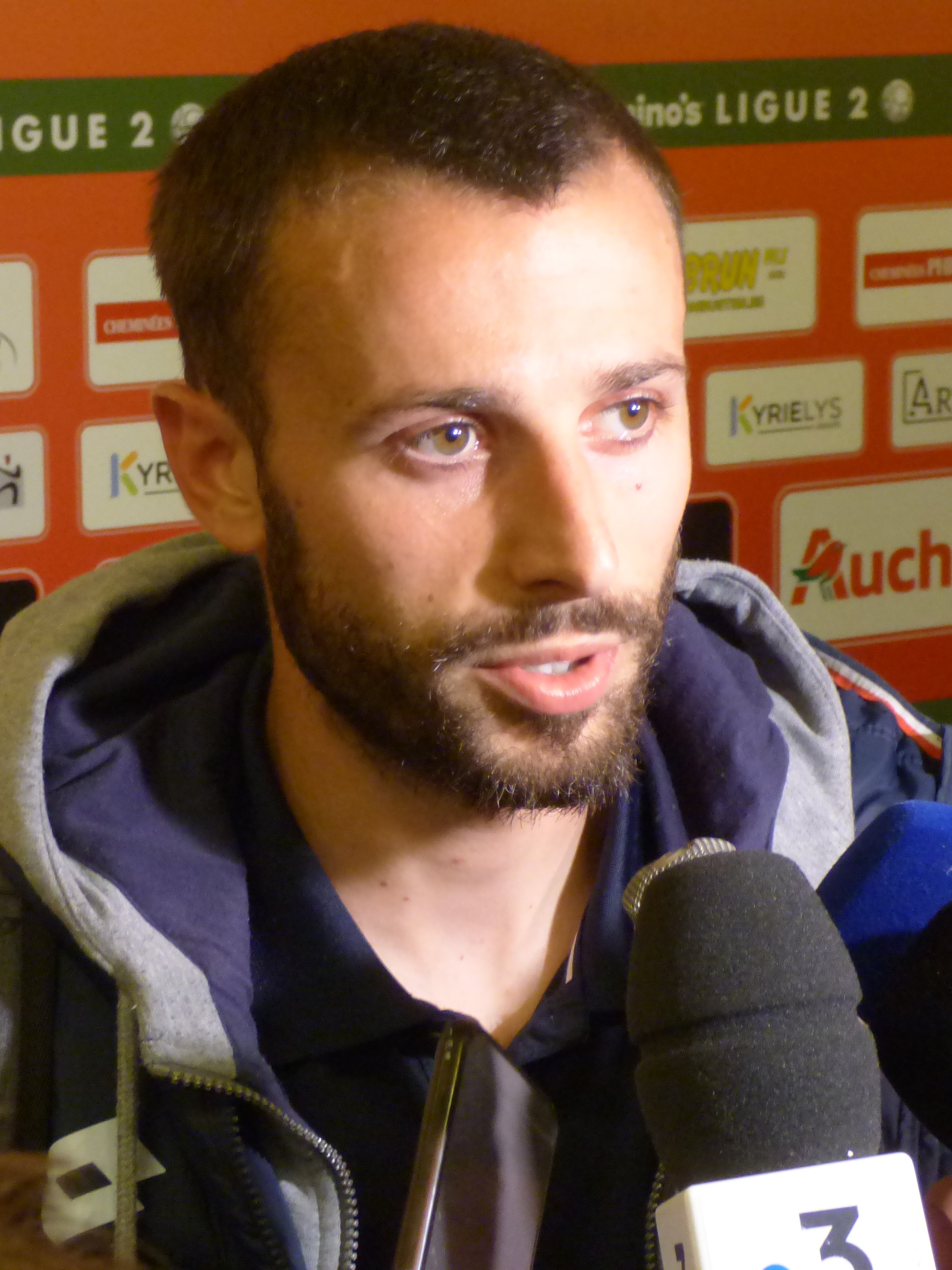

Personal information
- Full name: Jordan Marié
- Date of birth: 29 September 1991 (age 35)
- Place of birth: Épinal, France
- Height: 1.77 m (5 ft 10 in)
- Position: Midfielder

Team information
- Current team: Dijon
- Number: 14

Senior career*
Years	Team	Apps	(Gls)
2012–2018	Dijon B	25	(2)
2013–	Dijon	319	(13)
- * Club domestic league appearances and goals as of 22 June 2026

Jordan Marié (born 29 September 1991) is a French professional footballer who plays as a midfielder for Championnat National club Dijon.
