= Dijon FCO =

French football club

- Full name: Dijon Football Côte-d'Or
- Nickname: Les rouges (The reds)
- Founded: 1998; 28 years ago
- Ground: Stade Gaston Gérard
- Capacity: 15,459
- President: Pierre-Henri Deballon
- Manager: Baptiste Ridira
- League: Ligue 2
- 2025–26: Championnat National, 1st of 17 (promoted)
- Website: www.dfco.fr
Home colours	Away colours

Dijon Football Côte d'Or (French pronunciation: [diʒɔ̃ futbol kot dɔʁ]; lit. 'Dijon Football Gold Coast'), commonly referred to as Dijon FCO, Dijon or simply as DFCO, is a French football club based in Dijon. The club was founded in 1998 as a result of a merger between two local clubs in the city, and competed in Ligue 2 after suffering relegation from Ligue 1 in the 2011–12 season. The club earned promotion back to Ligue 1 at the end of the 2015–16 season, remained for five seasons before two relegations in three years saw the club relegated out of the professional leagues at the end of the 2022–23 season. The club's president is Olivier Delcourt. Dijon plays its home matches at the Stade Gaston Gérard.

== History ==
The history of football in Dijon began in 1903 with the founding of Cercle Laïque Dijonnais (Dijon Secular Club). The club's football section was set up in 1913. During World War II Cercle Laïque Dijonnais was renamed Cercle Sportif Dijon (Dijon Sports Club) and merged with FC Dijon. The new club, called Cercle Sportif Laïque Dijonnais (Dijon Secular Sports Club), joined Burgundy's regional Division Honneur at its creation in 1945. In spring 1960, the club won the Burgundy championship for the first time.

After a spell in the top level amateur league from 1962, the club was coached by Pierre Danzelle and was able to field a stronger team, as shown by its winning the CFA Centre division in 1965. Refusing repeated proposals by the footballing authorities for the club to turn professional, Dijon's directors brought about the breakup of the team. The club was relegated to the Division d'Honneur in 1967. The club won promotion to Division 3 in 1974 with the help of Philippe Piat. In the late 1970s, meanwhile, several small clubs merged to form Dijon FC. This new club became the rivals of Cercle Sportif Laïque Dijonnais in the Burgundian capital. During the 1980s Cercle was owned by Jean Claude Dubouil. For the first time in its history, the club played in Division 2 between 1987 and 1991. Despite some good results, however, the club declined both financially and in terms of performance. Meanwhile, the city's second club, Dijon FC, coached by Daniel Joseph, was promoted to the CFA, the same division as Cercle.

=== Formation (1998–2005) ===
In 1998, the two leading clubs of the city, the Cercle Sportif Laïque Dijonnais and Dijon FC decided to merge to give Dijon a stronger club, which was named Dijon Football Côte-d'Or (DFCO). During its first season in CFA, DFCO's manager was Noël Tosi. The club missed out on promotion in the last match of the season. Noël Tosi was dismissed, and replaced by his deputy, Daniel Joseph. The following season, promotion was won in a match against Calais RUFC, again on the last day of the season. The same year DFCO beat Alès to win the French Amateur title, the club's first trophy.

The following two seasons in National were difficult for the club. During the 2000–01 season, the club narrowly escaped relegation. Following the departure of Daniel Joseph, his deputy Mario Relmy took over and again the team managed to avoid relegation. In 2002, Rudi Garcia arrived at Dijon, which turned professional in 2004. In his first season as coach, Garcia took Dijon briefly to the top of the National league before they finally finished 4th, three points away from promotion. In 2004 Dijon achieved a memorable run in the Coupe de France, beating Saint-Étienne (L2), Lens (L1), Reims (L2) and Amiens (L2) before losing to Châteauroux (L2) in the semi-final. In the same year DFCO was promoted to Ligue 2.

=== Ligue 2 (2005–2011) ===
Promotion to Ligue 2 allowed the club to be separated into two entities: professional and amateur. Despite limited resources and poor infrastructure, DFCO achieved an impressive 4th place in its first season in Ligue 2. The club also achieved the exploit of beating Bordeaux in the 16th round of the Coupe de la Ligue.

At the end of the 2005–06 season, the club finished fifth. The club's aim was promotion to Ligue 1. During the 2006–07 season, Dijon narrowly missed several opportunities to reach the podium, but finally finished 8th. June 2007 marked the end of an era as Rudi Garcia left to manage Le Mans. The new coach, Serge Romano, led the club to a top-three position during the season for the first time in the club's history, but after the club fell down the table Serge Romano was sacked in December 2007. He was replaced by Faruk Hadžibegić in January 2008 after Frederic Bompard briefly took charge as caretaker. The new coach then saved the club from relegation thanks to a draw on the last day of the season away to AC Ajaccio. The same year, the club reached the quarter finals of the Coupe de France for the first time, but lost to Amiens on 15 April 2008.

The 2008–09 season was marked by the arrival of the French international Eric Carrière, as well as Pierre-Emerick Aubameyang on loan from A.C. Milan. Despite their contribution, DFCO remained stuck in the lower half of the table, although they put themselves beyond relegation in April. In the Coupe de France Dijon lost against the Ligue 1 team Grenoble on penalties after a 1–1 draw.

Following a dispute during the summer break in 2009 between President Bernard Gnecchi and the coach at the time, Faruk Hadžibegić, Gnecchi chose to appoint Patrice Carteron as the new coach. After a first season ended in mid-table, DFCO was promoted to Ligue 1 at the end of the 2010–11 season for the first time in its history, thanks to finishing third in Ligue 2.

=== Ligue 1 (2011–2012) ===
Dijon played in Ligue 1 for the first time in its history during the 2011–12 season. On 7 August 2011, the Burgundy club played its first top-flight match against Rennes at home, scoring its first goal and recording its first defeat (1–5). The following Saturday, DFCO lost to Toulouse 2–0. The club's first victory in Ligue 1 came at home on 20 August against Lorient (2–0). The club won a second match in Annecy against Evian Thonon-Gaillard (0–1), but then lost against Lyon at home in the next match (1–2). Dijon was 16th in the table at the winter break, and recorded a series of good results afterward, drawing with the future champions Montpellier (1–1), and beating Marseille (2–1) on 17 March 2012, but internal conflicts and poor performances by leading players such as Benjamin Corgnet and ex-Chelsea player Gaël Kakuta weighed heavily at the end of the season. After a win against SM Caen (2–0) on 25 March 2012, Dijon failed to win another match, losing six and drawing three. On 20 May 2012, on the last day of the season, Dijon lost heavily to Rennes (5–0) and were officially relegated to Ligue 2, accompanied by their local rivals, Auxerre. Conceding 63 goals in 38 games, Dijon had the worst defence in Ligue 1 during their first season in the top flight. Following the relegation, club president Bernard Gnecchi resigned and manager Patrice Carteron left the club.

=== Return to Ligue 2 (2012–2016) ===
The new president was Olivier Delcourt, while Olivier Dall'Oglio took over as coach. During the first season back in Ligue 2, the club finished 7th. On 22 April 2016, Dijon won promotion back to Ligue 1 finishing second on the table.

=== Ligue 1 (2016–2021) ===
In Dijon's first season back in Ligue 1, they managed to survive relegation and finish 16th. In the 2017–18 Ligue 1 season, Dijon finished 11th, improving their club record of 16th, which they set last season. The 2017–18 campaign, which was only the club's third-ever top-flight season, saw them end on 48 points, 11 more than they managed last year.

In the 2018–19 Ligue 1 season, Dijon finished in 18th place on the table and were required to play a two legged play off against Ligue 2 side RC Lens. After a 1–1 draw in the first leg, Dijon would win the second leg and the tie 3–1 after two goalkeeping blunders by Lens keeper Jérémy Vachoux cost his side a chance of promotion to Ligue 1 and ensured Dijon's survival.

With four games left to play, Dijon were relegated back to Ligue 2 in the 2020–21 Ligue 1 season, following a 5–1 defeat to Stade Rennais on 25 April 2021.

== Records ==
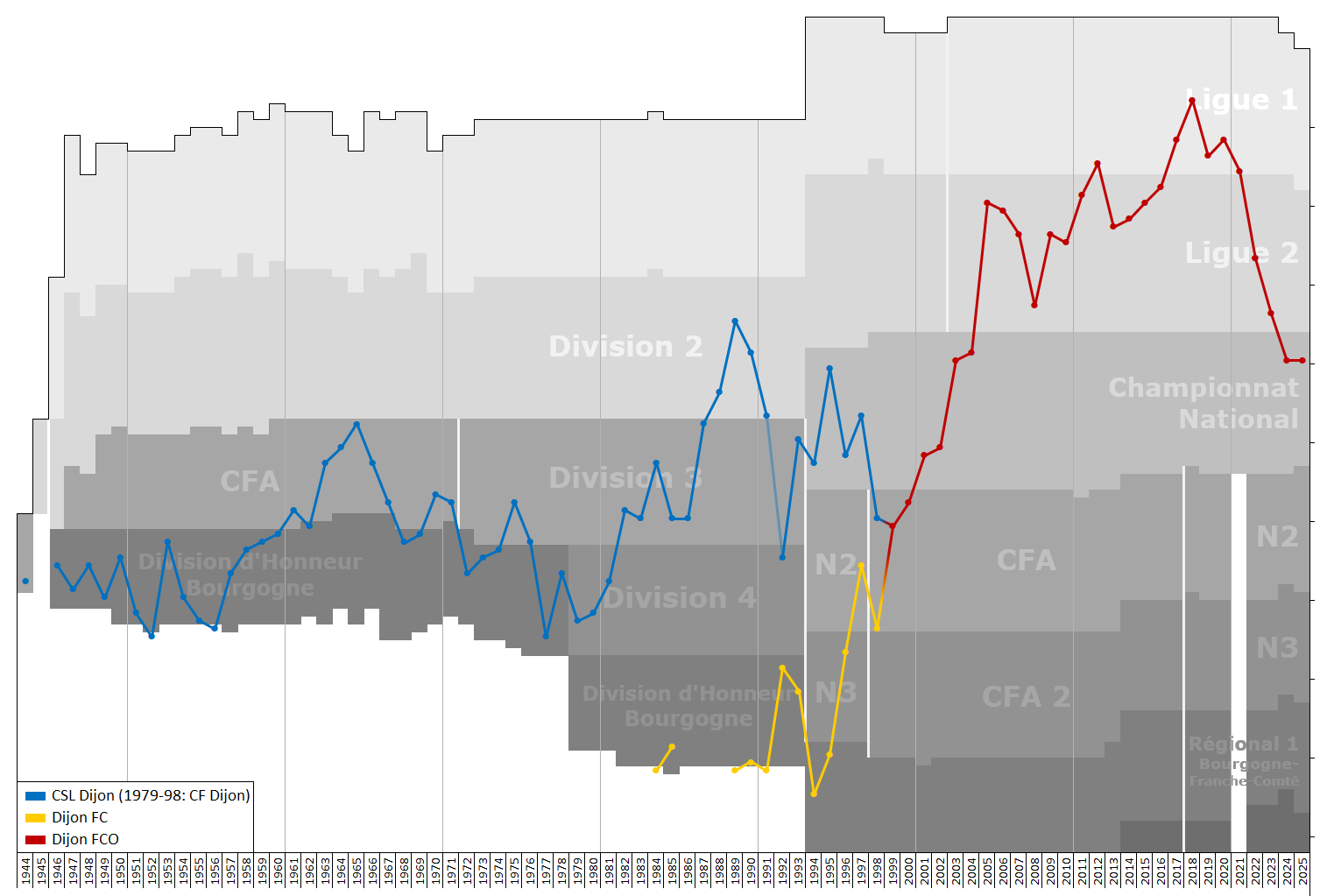
Historical league performance chart of Dijon FCO

- Matches played: Stéphane Mangione (283 matches)
- Number of goals: Julio Tavares (80 goals) (still in the team)
- Matches against: Rudi Garcia (204 matches)
- Biggest purchase: Brice Jovial (€2M for Le Havre Athletic Club )
- Biggest Sale: Loïs Diony (€10M to AS Saint Etienne, including bonuses)
- The oldest player in a match: Stéphane Grégoire (39 years, 3 months and 23 days at Dijon and Strasbourg (3–1, Ligue 2) 25 May 2007)
- Youngest player in a match: Patrick M'Pondo (17 years, 2 months and 17 days at Brest-Dijon (0–1 National) 27 October 2001)
- Most goals in one game: 12 (US Mahault Baie-Dijon FCO :1–12 Coupe de France 1998–1999)
- Most goals conceded in a match: 8 ( Paris Saint German -Dijon FCO :8–0 Ligue 1 2017–2018)
- Victory with the biggest difference: 11 (US Mahault Baie-Dijon FCO :1–12 Coupe de France 1998–1999)
- Defeat with the biggest difference: -8 (Paris Saint German -Dijon FCO :8–0 Ligue 1 2017–2018)

== Players ==
=== First team ===
As of 7 September 2026

Note: Flags indicate national team as defined under FIFA eligibility rules; some limited exceptions apply. Players may hold more than one non-FIFA nationality.

No.	Pos.	Nation	Player
4	MF	FRA	Mickaël Barreto
5	DF	FRA	Quentin Bernard
6	DF	SEN	Waly Diouf
7	MF	COM	Ben-Chayeel Hamada
8	MF	FRA	Paul Bellon
9	FW	FRA	Tyris Dong
10	FW	FRA	Yanis Barka
11	FW	CPV	Júlio Tavares
14	MF	FRA	Jordan Marié
15	DF	FRA	Axel Bargain
16	GK	FRA	Paul Delecroix
17	MF	FRA	Adel Lembezat
18	MF	COD	Brandon Ndezi
19	DF	FRA	César Obongo

No.	Pos.	Nation	Player
20	MF	FRA	Hugo Vargas-Rios
21	MF	TUN	Samy Chouchane
23	DF	FRA	Lenny Lacroix
29	FW	FRA	Alexis Ntamack
30	MF	FRA	Hatem Mimoune
31	DF	FRA	Moussa Faty
33	FW	FRA	Florian Rombogouera
37	FW	COM	Abdelmajid Djae
42	FW	FRA	Ylan Aka
46	GK	FRA	Ylann Marie-Rose
71	GK	FRA	Enzo Ketterle
90	FW	CIV	Ange Lago
93	DF	MAR	Ismaïl Bouleghcha
—	DF	MAR	Anass Benyahya

==== Out on loan ====
Note: Flags indicate national team as defined under FIFA eligibility rules; some limited exceptions apply. Players may hold more than one non-FIFA nationality.

No. / Pos. / Nation / Player; — / DF / FRA / Brayan Djadja (at Istres until 30 June 2027)	No. / Pos. / Nation / Player; — / MF / FRA / Loris Dupont (at Voltigeurs de Châteaubriant until 30 June 2027)

== Coaching staff ==
Position	Name
Manager	Benoît Tavenot
Assistant manager	Didier Lacroix
Goalkeeper coach	Claude Heraux
Fitness coach	Grégory Mancienne; Théo Pierrot
Video analyst	Pierre-Alain Montecer
Sports doctor	Philippe Paulin
Physiotherapist	Nicolas Didry; Corentin Boisiaux
Intendant	Jordane Terrade
Human Resources Director	Gérard Bonneau
Recruitment unit	Jean-Patrick Morel; Yohann Rivière

== Coaching history ==
- Noël Tosi (1998–99)
- Daniel Joseph (1999–01)
- Mario Relmy (2001–02)
- Rudi Garcia (2002–07)
- Serge Romano (June 2007 – December 2007)
- Frédéric Bompard (December 2007)
- Faruk Hadžibegić (December 2007 – June 2009)
- Patrice Carteron (July 2009 – May 2012)
- Olivier Dall'Oglio (2012–2018)
- Antoine Kombouaré (2019)
- Stéphane Jobard (2019–2020)
- David Linarès (2020–2021)
- Patrice Garande (2021–2022)
- Omar Daf (2022–2023)
- Pascal Dupraz (2023)
- Benoît Tavenot (2023–present)

== Crest history ==
The owl, associated with an architectural detail at the Church of Notre-Dame of Dijon, is a symbol of the city. The club's first crest featured Dijon's Guillaume Gate (Place Darcy) with an owl in the foreground. In the 2006 version, the owl was shown in full flight, while the Guillaume Gate gave way to a plain red background, in line with the team's new home kit. The owl is shown opening its wings to represent V for victory. Between the wings appears "1998", the date of the club's foundation in its modern form, and at the top 'DFCO' and 'Dijon Football Côte d'Or'. The current crest is an updated version of 2006's, with the words 'Dijon Football Côte d'Or' having disappeared, leaving only 'DFCO' and '1998' written in white on the red background.
