= Tchaouna =

Tchaouna is a Chadian surname. Notable people with the surname include:

- Haroun Tchaouna (born 2000), Chadian football forward
- Loum Tchaouna (born 2003), French football winger
- Franck Tchaouna (born 2005), Chadian football striker
- Franky Tchaouna (born 2005), Chadian football midfielder
