= 2022–23 Dijon FCO season =

Dijon FCO
2022–23 season
- President: Olivier Delcourt
- Head coach: Omar Daf
- Stadium: Stade Gaston Gérard
- Ligue 2: 18th (relegated)
- Coupe de France: Seventh round
- Top goalscorer: League: Mickaël Le Bihan (12); All: Mickaël Le Bihan (12)

The 2022–23 season was the 25th season in the history of Dijon FCO and their second consecutive season in the second division. The club participated in Ligue 2 and the Coupe de France.

== Players ==
As of 15 July 2022

Note: Flags indicate national team as defined under FIFA eligibility rules; some limited exceptions apply. Players may hold more than one non-FIFA nationality.

No.	Pos.	Nation	Player
3	DF	FRA	Daniel Congré
4	DF	ALG	Reda Benchaa
5	DF	MLI	Senou Coulibaly
6	MF	BEN	Mattéo Ahlinvi
7	FW	ROU	Alex Dobre
8	FW	FRA	Mickaël Le Bihan
11	MF	FRA	Valentin Jacob
12	DF	CIV	Adama Fofana
13	DF	FRA	Christopher Rocchia
14	MF	FRA	Jordan Marié
15	MF	FRA	Rayane El Khamali
16	GK	BEN	Saturnin Allagbé
17	MF	FRA	Yanis Chahid
18	FW	SEN	Idrissa Camara
20	MF	GAB	Didier Ndong
21	FW	FRA	Aurélien Scheidler

No.	Pos.	Nation	Player
22	FW	FRA	Walid Nassi
25	MF	FRA	Jessy Pi
27	DF	MLI	Cheick Traoré
28	MF	FRA	Bryan Soumaré
29	MF	CMR	Loïc Etoga
30	GK	FRA	Baptiste Reynet
31	MF	ALG	Yassine Benzia
32	DF	SEN	Zargo Touré
40	GK	FRA	Thomas Roche
77	FW	CIV	Roger Assalé
88	MF	FRA	Lucas Deaux
92	DF	CMR	Ahmad Ngouyamsa
93	MF	SEN	Ousseynou Thioune
—	MF	KOS	Bersant Celina
—	FW	SEN	Moussa Konaté

== Pre-season and friendlies ==
Win Draw Loss Fixtures

1 July 2022 Friendly	Dijon (France)	6–0	(France) Saint-Apollinaire	Saint-Apollinaire
19:30 CEST (UTC+2)				Stadium: Complexe Sportif ASPTT Dijon

9 July 2022 Friendly	Dijon (France)	6–0	(France) Villefranche	Saint-Georges-de-Reneins
17:00 CEST (UTC+2)	Chahid 24', 45+1'; Scheidler 39'; Soumaré 45'; Le Bihan 79'; Marié 83'		Sergio (penalty missed) 29'	Stadium: Stade de Football Montchervet

16 July 2022 Friendly	Annecy (France)	1–1	(France) Dijon	Lons-le-Saunier
16:00 CEST (UTC+2)	Temanfo 50'		Le Bihan 45+3'	Stadium: Stade Municipal; Attendance: 300

22 July 2022 Friendly	Dijon (France)	1–0	(France) Le Havre	Clairefontaine-en-Yvelines
18 :00 CEST (UTC+2)	Le Bihan 44'

17 December 2022 Friendly	Clermont (France)	Cancelled	(France) Dijon	Yzeure
16:00 CET (UTC+1)				Stadium: Stade de Bellevue

== Competitions ==
=== Overall record ===
Competition	First match	Last match	Starting round	Final position	Record							
Competition	First match	Last match	Starting round	Final position	Pld	W	D	L	GF	GA	GD	Win %
Ligue 2	30 July 2022	2 June 2023	Matchday 1	18th	38	10	12	16	38	43	−5	26.32
Coupe de France	29 October 2022		Seventh round	Seventh round	1	0	1	0	1	1	+0	0.00
Total					39	10	13	16	39	44	−5	25.64

Source: Soccerway

=== Ligue 2 ===
==== League table ====
Pos	Team	Pld	W	D	L	GF	GA	GD	Pts	Promotion or Relegation
16	Valenciennes	38	10	15	13	42	49	−7	45	
17	Annecy	38	11	12	15	39	51	−12	45	Spared from relegation
18	Dijon (R)	38	10	12	16	38	43	−5	42	Relegation to Championnat National
19	Nîmes (R)	38	10	6	22	44	62	−18	36	Relegation to Championnat National
20	Niort (R)	38	7	8	23	35	67	−32	29	Relegation to Championnat National

Source: Ligue 2
Rules for classification: 1) Points; 2) Goal difference; 3) Number of goals scored; 4) Head-to-head goal difference; 5) Fair play points
(R) Relegated

==== Results summary ====
Overall								Home						Away					
Pld	W	D	L	GF	GA	GD	Pts	W	D	L	GF	GA	GD	W	D	L	GF	GA	GD
7	3	2	2	8	8	0	11	2	1	1	6	6	0	1	1	1	2	2	0

Last updated: 2 September 2022.
Source: Ligue 2

==== Results by round ====
Round	1	2	3	4	5	6	7
Ground	H	A	H	H	A	H	A
Result	W	D	D	W	W	L	L
Position	5	4	8	4	2	3	

Updated to match(es) played on 2 September 2022. Source: Ligue 2
A = Away; H = Home; W = Win; D = Draw; L = Loss

==== Matches ====
The league fixtures were announced on 17 June 2022.

30 July 2022 1	Dijon	2–1	Saint-Étienne	Dijon
15:00 CEST (UTC+2)	Le Bihan 29'; Soumaré 41'	Report	Aiki 69'	Stadium: Stade Gaston Gérard; Attendance: 11,465; Referee: Romain Lissorgue

6 August 2022 2	Pau	0–0	Dijon	Pau
19:00 CEST (UTC+2)		Report		Stadium: Nouste Camp; Attendance: 3,203; Referee: Abdelatif Kherradji

13 August 2022 3	Dijon	2–2	Caen	Dijon
19:00 CEST (UTC+2)	Silva 60'; Soumaré 90' (pen.)	Report	Mendy 49'; Traoré 87' (o.g.)	Stadium: Stade Gaston Gérard; Attendance: 7,342; Referee: Pierre Legat

20 August 2022 4	Dijon	2–1	Nîmes	Dijon
19:00 CEST (UTC+2)	Jacob 38'; Le Bihan 75'	Report	Koné 83'	Stadium: Stade Gaston Gérard; Attendance: 7,500; Referee: Faouzi Benchabane

27 August 2022 5	Metz	1–2	Dijon	Metz
15:00 CEST (UTC+2)	Gueye 78'	Report	Silva 29'; Le Bihan 59'	Stadium: Stade Saint-Symphorien; Attendance: 14,257; Referee: Benoît Millot

30 August 2022 6	Dijon	0–2	Annecy	Dijon
20:45 CEST (UTC+2)		Report	Bosetti 39' (pen.); Shamal 90+1'	Stadium: Stade Gaston Gérard; Attendance: 7,662; Referee: Nicolas Rainville

2 September 2022 7	Bastia	1–0	Dijon	Furiani
20:45 CEST (UTC+2)	Alfarela 55'	Report		Stadium: Stade Armand Cesari; Attendance: 10,000; Referee: Benjamin Lepaysant

10 September 2022 8	Dijon	0–2	Sochaux	Dijon
19:00 CEST (UTC+2)	Traoré (yellow card) 35'; Coulibaly (yellow card) 90+4'	Report	Ndour (yellow card) 14'; Sissoko 26'; Doumbia 55'; Do Couto (yellow card) 84'; Agouzoul (yellow card) 90+4'	Stadium: Stade Gaston Gérard; Attendance: 10,004; Referee: Remi Landry

17 September 2022 9	Bordeaux	2–1	Dijon	Bordeaux
15:00 CEST (UTC+2)	Maja 8' (pen.); Ihnatenko (yellow card) 11'; Bakwa (yellow card) 52'; Davitashvili 87'	Report	Le Bihan 71'; Jacob (yellow card) 79'	Stadium: Matmut Atlantique; Attendance: 17,323; Referee: Hakim Ben El Hadj

1 October 2022 10	Dijon	0–0	Le Havre	Dijon
19:00 CEST (UTC+2)	Fofana (yellow card) 1'; Rocchia (yellow card) 41'; Tchaouna (yellow card) 71'; Thioune (yellow card) 85'	Report	Kitala (yellow card) 6'; Casimir (yellow card) 8'; Mbemba (yellow card) 19'	Stadium: Stade Gaston Gérard; Attendance: 6,533; Referee: Romain Lissorgue

8 October 2022 11	Amiens	2–1	Dijon	Amiens
19:00 CEST (UTC+2)	Mendy (yellow card) 15'; Gélin (yellow card) 29'; Opoku (red card) 43'; Leautey (penalty scored) 57'; Kakuta 88'	Report	Gurtner 4' (o.g.); Le Bihan (penalty missed) 16'; Camara (yellow card) 52'; Jacob (yellow card) 64'; Traoré (yellow card) 77'; Coulibaly (yellow card) 90'	Stadium: Stade de la Licorne; Attendance: 8,517; Referee: Benjamin Lepaysant

15 October 2022 12	Dijon	0–0	Quevilly-Rouen	Dijon
19:00 CEST (UTC+2)	Congré (yellow card) 61'	Report	Pendant (yellow card) 19'	Stadium: Stade Gaston Gérard; Attendance: 6,000; Referee: Thomas Leonard

22 October 2022 13	Niort	2–1	Dijon	Niort
19:00 CEST (UTC+2)	M'bondo (yellow card) 9'; Sagna (yellow card) 62'; Boutobba (penalty missed) 70', 90', (yellow card) 90+1'; Olaitan (yellow card) 89'; Conté 90+3'	Report	Assalé 52'; Silva (red card) 76'	Stadium: Stade René Gaillard; Attendance: 3,869; Referee: Azzédine Souifi

5 November 2022 14	Dijon	1–1	Guingamp	Dijon
19:00 CET (UTC+1)	Ngouyamsa (yellow card) 7'; Touré 52'; Congré (yellow card) 76'	Report	Quemper (yellow card) 9'; Roux (yellow card) 41'; Luvambo 45+2'; Vitelli (yellow card) 50'; Manceau (yellow card) 70'	Stadium: Stade Gaston Gérard; Attendance: 6,837; Referee: William Toulliou

12 November 2022 15	Grenoble	0–0	Dijon	Grenoble
19:00 CET (UTC+1)	Touray (yellow card) 24'	Report	Ndong (yellow card) 32'; Traoré (yellow card) 73'	Stadium: Stade des Alpes; Attendance: 6,573; Referee: Antoine Valnet

26 December 2022 16	Dijon	5–0	Laval	Dijon
21:00 CET (UTC+1)	Jacob (yellow card) 22'; Fofana (yellow card) 23'; Cros 27' (o.g.); Soumaré 30', (penalty scored) 88'; Le Bihan 37', (yellow card) 45'; Silva 63'	Report	Sanna (yellow card) 14'; Duterte (yellow card) 65'; Baudry (yellow card) 71'	Stadium: Stade Gaston Gérard; Attendance: 3,500; Referee: Abdelatif Kherradji

30 December 2022 17	Rodez	2–1	Dijon	Rodez
21:00 CET (UTC+1)	Depres 9'; Senaya 16'; Boissier (yellow card) 58'	Report	Congré (yellow card) 35'; Silva 68'; Le Bihan (yellow card) 90+4'	Stadium: Stade Paul-Lignon; Attendance: 3,009; Referee: Pierre Legat

10 January 2022 18	Paris FC	2–1	Dijon	Paris
20:45 CET (UTC+1)	Iglesias 11'; Bernauer (yellow card) 19'; Gueho 90+3'	Report	Silva 62'; Traoré (red card) 84'; Le Bihan (yellow card) 90+3'	Stadium: Stade Sébastien Charléty; Attendance: 2,807; Referee: William Toulliou

13 January 2023 19	Dijon	2–1	Valenciennes	Dijon
20:45 CET (UTC+1)	Le Bihan 45+1'; Camara 75'	Report	Berthomier (penalty scored) 50'; Boutoutaou (yellow card) 89'	Stadium: Stade Gaston Gérard; Attendance: 5,883; Referee: Gaël Angoula

28 January 2023 20	Dijon	0–3	Bordeaux	Dijon
19:00 CET (UTC+1)	Joly (yellow card) 29'; Traoré (yellow card) 70'	Report	Barbet 12', 56'; Bakwa 60'	Stadium: Stade Gaston Gérard; Attendance: 7,428; Referee: Benjamin Lepaysant

31 January 2023 21	Laval	1–0	Dijon	Laval
20:45 CET (UTC+1)	Sanna (yellow card) 22'; Durbant 66'	Report	Pi (yellow card) 26'; Ndong (yellow card) 62'; Jacob (yellow card) 90+2'	Stadium: Stade Francis Le Basser; Attendance: 5,585; Referee: Faouzi Benchabane

3 February 2023 22	Dijon	0–1	Niort	Dijon
20:45 CET (UTC+1)		Report	Olaitan 22', (yellow card) 77'; Zemzemi (yellow card) 47'; Boutobba (yellow card) 90+5'	Stadium: Stade Gaston Gérard; Attendance: 5,600; Referee: Olivier Thual

11 February 2023 23	Saint-Étienne	2–0	Dijon	Saint-Étienne
15:00 CET (UTC+1)	Krasso 12'; Bouchouari 39'; Sow (yellow card) 70'	Report	Fofana (yellow card) 80'	Stadium: Stade Geoffroy-Guichard; Attendance: 21,215; Referee: Guillaume Paradis

18 February 2023 24	Dijon	0–0	Metz	Dijon
19:00 CET (UTC+1)	Ahlinvi (yellow card) 19'; Fofana (yellow card) 49'	Report	Atta (yellow card) 18'; Maïga (yellow card) 59'; I. Traoré (yellow card) 65'	Stadium: Stade Gaston-Gérard; Attendance: 6,657; Referee: Romain Lissorgue

25 February 2023 25	Valenciennes	2–2	Dijon	Valenciennes
19:00 CET (UTC+1)	Kaba 51'; Grbić (penalty scored) 55'; Ben Seghir (yellow card) 82'	Report	Fofana (yellow card) 40'; Le Bihan 49'; Silva 72'; Thioune (yellow card) 78'	Stadium: Stade Nungesser; Attendance: 5,124; Referee: Azzédine Souifi

4 March 2023 26	Dijon	1–0	Grenoble	Dijon
19:00 CET (UTC+1)	Le Bihan 21'; Joly (yellow card) 88'; Pi (yellow card) 90+4'	Report	Gaspar (yellow card) 32'; Sanyang (yellow card) 68'; Touray (yellow card) 74'	Stadium: Stade Gaston-Gérard; Attendance: 4,500; Referee: Olivier Thual

11 March 2023 27	Guingamp	2–0	Dijon	Guingamp
19:00 CET (UTC+1)	El Ouazzani 34'; Quemper (yellow card) 41'; Roux (yellow card) 55'; Siwe 85'	Report	Traoré (yellow card) 11' (yellow-red card) 25'; Allagbé (yellow card) 28'	Stadium: Stade de Roudourou; Attendance: 8,126; Referee: Rémi Landry

18 March 2023 28	Dijon	0–1	Pau	Dijon
19:00 CET (UTC+1)	Ahlinvi (red card) 50'; Le Bihan (yellow card) 59'	Report	D'Almeida (yellow card) 24'; Begraoui 30'; Evans (yellow card) 40'; Kouassi (yellow card) 54'; Beusnard (yellow card) 85'	Stadium: Stade Gaston-Gérard; Attendance: 8,725; Referee: Mikael Lesage

1 April 2023 29	Caen	2–1	Dijon	Caen
19:00 CEST (UTC+2)	Mendy (yellow card) 54' (penalty scored) 70'; Brahimi 60'	Report	Touré 2', (yellow card) 68'; Thioune (yellow card) 68'	Stadium: Stade Michel d'Ornano; Attendance: 13,341; Referee: Guillaume Paradis

8 April 2023 30	Dijon	1–0	Rodez	Dijon
19:00 CEST (UTC+2)	Ahlinvi (yellow card) 71'; Le Bihan 75'	Report		Stadium: Stade Gaston-Gérard; Attendance: 6,859; Referee: Abdelatif Kherradji

15 April 2023 31	Quevilly-Rouen	2–2	Dijon	Rouen
19:00 CEST (UTC+2)	Ben Youssef (yellow card) 26'; Bangré (yellow card) 31', (goal) 42'; Mafouta 76' (pen.); Sidibé (yellow card) 90+3'	Report	Ahlinvi 50'; Le Bihan 53'; Rocchia (yellow card) 75'	Stadium: Stade Robert Diochon; Attendance: 2,645; Referee: Rémi Landry

22 April 2023 32	Dijon	1–1	Bastia	Dijon
19:00 CEST (UTC+2)	Thioune (yellow card) 66'; Le Bihan (yellow card) 71'; Soumaré 74'	Report	Ducrocq (yellow card) 38'; Salles-Lamonge 58'; Santelli (yellow card) 74'; Bohnert (yellow card) 79'; Kaïboué (yellow card) 90+5'	Stadium: Stade Gaston-Gérard; Attendance: 7,038; Referee: Romain Lissorgue

1 May 2023 33	Sochaux	0–2	Dijon	Montbéliard
19:00 CET (UTC+1)	Meddah (red card) 13'; Kanouté (yellow card) 48'; Ndiaye (yellow card) 90+1'; Kalulu (yellow card) 90+3'	Report	Thioune (yellow card) 24'; Aké 33'; Ahlinvi 39'; Congré (yellow card) 90+3'	Stadium: Stade Auguste Bonal; Attendance: 10,577; Referee: Benjamin Lepaysant

6 May 2023 34	Annecy	1–1	Dijon	Annecy
19:00 CEST (UTC+2)	Pajot (yellow card) 50'; Mendy (yellow card) 71'; Demoncy (yellow card) 82'; Bosetti 86'	Report	Fofana (yellow card) 20'; Marié (yellow card) 82'; Soumaré 88'	Stadium: Parc des Sports; Attendance: 6,362; Referee: Pierre Gaillouste

13 May 2023 35	Dijon	3–0	Amiens	Dijon
19:00 CEST (UTC+2)	Le Bihan 7' 45'; Aké 74', (yellow card) 90+3'	Report	Ring (yellow card) 45+1'; Fofana (MF) (yellow card) 57'	Stadium: Stade Gaston-Gérard; Attendance: 9,511; Referee: Karim Abed

20 May 2023 36	Nîmes	1–2	Dijon	Nîmes
19:00 CET (UTC+1)	Saïd 19'; Benezet (yellow card) 64'	Report	Tchaouna 55'; Marié 77'; Thioune (yellow card) 84'; Nassi (yellow card) 86'	Stadium: Stade des Antonins; Attendance: 1,567; Referee: Jérémy Stinat

26 May 2023 37	Dijon	1–1	Paris FC	Dijon
19:00 CEST (UTC+2)	Aké 48'; Soumaré (yellow card) 56'	Report	López 57'	Stadium: Stade Gaston-Gérard; Attendance: 14,210; Referee: Ruddy Buquet

2 June 2023 38	Le Havre	1–0	Dijon	Le Havre
19:00 CEST (UTC+2)	Casimir 11'; Opéri (yellow card) 33'; Sangante (yellow card) 40'; Targhalline (yellow card) 60'	Report	Thioune (yellow card) 42'	Stadium: Stade Océane; Attendance: 23,561; Referee: Romain Lissorgue

=== Coupe de France ===
29 October 2022 7th Rnd	Saint-Pryvé Saint-Hilaire FC	1–1 (3–2 p)	Dijon	Saint-Pryvé-Saint-Mesmin
16:00 CEST	Cherchour 62'	Report	Tchaouna 11'	Stadium: Stade du Grand Clos; Attendance: 679; Referee: Edgar Barenton
