= 2025 Atlanta United FC season =

Atlanta United FC
2025 season
- Owner: Arthur Blank
- President: Garth Lagerwey
- Head coach: Ronny Deila
- Stadium: Mercedes-Benz Stadium; Atlanta, Georgia
- MLS: Conference: 14th Overall: 29th
- MLS Cup playoffs: Did not qualify
- Leagues Cup: League phase
- Top goalscorer: League: Emmanuel Latte Lath (7); All: Emmanuel Latte Lath; Aleksei Miranchuk (8 each)
- Average home league attendance: 41,435
Home colors	Away colors

The 2025 Atlanta United FC season was the ninth season of Atlanta United FC's existence, and the seventeenth year that a professional soccer club from Atlanta, Georgia competed in the top division of American soccer. Atlanta United played their home games at Mercedes-Benz Stadium. Outside of MLS, they competed in the 2025 Leagues Cup.

On December 20, prior to the 2025 season, United hired Norwegian manager Ronny Deila as the club's new head coach to replace interim manager Rob Valentino. Former midfielder Miguel Almirón returned to Atlanta after several seasons with Newcastle United in the English Premier League. The club then broke the MLS transfer record to sign striker Emmanuel Latte Lath from Middlesbrough for $22 million. United began the regular season with only two wins in its first eleven matches, its worst stretch in club history. The team never truly found their form and finished just 2 points ahead of the worst point total in the league, making it officially their worst season in club history. Atlanta United decided to part ways with head coach Ronny Deila just one day after the last match of the season.

== Club ==
Squad no.	Player	Nationality	Position(s)	Date of birth (age)	Previous club	Apps	Goals
Goalkeepers
1	Brad Guzan (captain)	(United States)	GK	September 9, 1984 (age 42)	(England) Middlesbrough	262	0
22	Josh Cohen	(United States)	GK	August 8, 1992 (age 34)	(Israel) Maccabi Haifa	8	0
42	Jayden Hibbert	(Canada)	GK	August 5, 2004 (age 22)	(United States) Atlanta United 2	9	0
Defenders
2	Ronald Hernández	(Venezuela)	RB	September 21, 1997 (age 29)	(Scotland) Aberdeen	87	3
4	Enea Mihaj	(Albania)	CB	July 5, 1998 (age 28)	(Portugal) Famalicão	12	0
5	Stian Gregersen	(Norway)	CB	May 17, 1995 (age 31)	(France) Bordeaux	53	3
6	Juan Berrocal	(Spain)	CB	February 5, 1999 (age 27)	(Spain) Getafe	10	0
11	Brooks Lennon	(United States)	RB	September 22, 1997 (age 29)	(United States) Real Salt Lake	195	11
18	Pedro Amador	(Portugal)	LB	December 18, 1998 (age 27)	(Portugal) Moreirense	43	1
47	Matthew Edwards (HGP)	(United States)	LB	February 16, 2003 (age 23)	(United States) Atlanta United 2	25	0
50	Dominik Chong-Qui (HGP)	(United States)	LB	December 29, 2007 (age 18)	(United States) Atlanta United 2	3	0
66	Nyk Sessock	(United States)	RB	June 17, 2000 (age 26)	(United States) Atlanta United 2	4	0
Midfielders
7	Steven Alzate	(Colombia)	CM	September 8, 1998 (age 28)	(England) Hull City	10	0
8	Tristan Muyumba	(France)	DM	March 7, 1997 (age 29)	(France) Guingamp	78	2
9	Saba Lobzhanidze	(Georgia (country))	LW	December 18, 1994 (age 31)	(Turkey) Hatayspor	86	15
10	Miguel Almirón (DP)	(Paraguay)	RW	February 10, 1994 (age 32)	(England) Newcastle United	103	29
13	Leo Afonso	(Brazil)	LW	July 13, 2001 (age 25)	(United States) Inter Miami	4	0
20	Luke Brennan (HGP)	(United States)	LW	February 24, 2005 (age 21)	(United States) Atlanta United 2	28	0
27	Ashton Gordon (HGP)	(Jamaica)	RW	April 14, 2007 (age 19)	(United States) Atlanta United 2	2	0
28	Will Reilly (HGP)	(United States)	CM	December 3, 2002 (age 23)	(United States) Stanford University	14	1
35	Ajani Fortune (HGP)	(Trinidad and Tobago)	AM	December 30, 2002 (age 23)	(United States) Atlanta United 2	69	2
48	Cooper Sanchez (HGP)	(United States)	CM	March 26, 2008 (age 18)	(United States) Atlanta United 2	3	0
59	Aleksei Miranchuk (DP)	(Russia)	AM	October 17, 1995 (age 31)	(Italy) Atalanta	50	11
99	Bartosz Slisz	(Poland)	DM	March 29, 1999 (age 27)	(Poland) Legia Warsaw	69	4
Forwards
14	Jamal Thiaré	(Senegal)	CF	March 31, 1993 (age 33)	(France) Le Havre	71	14
19	Emmanuel Latte Lath (DP)	(Ivory Coast)	CF	January 1, 1999 (age 27)	(England) Middlesbrough	32	8
30	Cayman Togashi	(Japan)	CF	August 10, 1993 (age 33)	(Japan) Sagan Tosu	9	1

== Player movement ==
=== In ===
No.	Pos.	Player	Transferred from	Type	US	Fee/notes	Date	Source
43	MF	(Poland) Mateusz Klich	(United States) D.C. United	Trade	Non-US	2025 1st Round Pick	December 20, 2024	
28	MF	(United States) Will Reilly	(United States) Stanford University	Transfer	US	Homegrown Contract	December 20, 2024	
—	MF	(Argentina) Franco Ibarra	(Argentina) Rosario Central	Loan return	Non-US	Free	January 1, 2025	
—	MF	(Argentina) Santiago Sosa	(Argentina) Racing Club	Loan return	Non-US	Free	January 1, 2025	
27	MF	(Jamaica) Ashton Gordon	(United States) Atlanta United 2	Transfer	US	Homegrown Contract	January 1, 2025	
42	GK	(Canada) Jayden Hibbert	(United States) Atlanta United 2	Transfer	US	Free	January 1, 2025	
30	FW	(Japan) Cayman Togashi	(Japan) Sagan Tosu	Transfer	US	Free	January 8, 2025	
10	MF	(Paraguay) Miguel Almirón	(England) Newcastle United	Transfer	Non-US	$10,000,000	January 30, 2025	
19	FW	(Ivory Coast) Emmanuel Latte Lath	(England) Middlesbrough	Transfer	Non-US	$22,000,000	February 4, 2025	
50	DF	(United States) Dominik Chong-Qui	(United States) Atlanta United 2	Transfer	US	Homegrown Contract	April 4, 2025	
4	DF	(Albania) Enea Mihaj	(Portugal) Famalicão	Transfer	Non-US	Free	July 2, 2025	
13	MF	(Brazil) Leo Afonso	(United States) Inter Miami	Trade	US	2025 International Roster Slot	July 27, 2025	
—	MF	(Colombia) Steven Alzate	(England) Hull City	Transfer	Non-US	$2,500,000	August 4, 2025	
48	MF	(United States) Cooper Sanchez	(United States) Atlanta United 2	Transfer	US	Homegrown Contract	August 5, 2025	
66	DF	(United States) Nyk Sessock	(United States) Atlanta United 2	Transfer	US	Free	August 5, 2025	

=== Out ===
No.	Pos.	Player	Transferred to	Type	US	Fee/notes	Date	Source
28	MF	(United States) Tyler Wolff	(United States) Real Salt Lake	Trade	US	$50,000 GAM	December 9, 2024	
19	FW	(Mexico) Daniel Ríos	(Mexico) Guadalajara	Loan return	Non-US	Free	January 1, 2025	
—	MF	(United States) Erik Centeno	(United States) Birmingham Legion	Option Declined	US	Free	January 1, 2025	
—	MF	(Argentina) Franco Ibarra	(Argentina) Rosario Central	Option Declined	Non-US	Free	January 1, 2025	
30	MF	(Brazil) Nicolas Firmino	(United States) Lexington SC	Option Declined	US	Free	January 1, 2025	
13	MF	(United States) Dax McCarty	Retired		US	Free	January 1, 2025	
31	GK	(United States) Quentin Westberg	Retired		US	Free	January 1, 2025	
—	MF	(Argentina) Santiago Sosa	(Argentina) Racing Club	Transfer	Non-US	$4,000,000	January 1, 2025	
45	MF	(Portugal) Xande Silva	(United States) St. Louis City	Trade	Non-US	$250,000 GAM	April 23, 2025	
43	MF	(Poland) Mateusz Klich	(Poland) Cracovia	Released	Non-US	Waived	July 21, 2025	
21	DF	(Bolivia) Efrain Morales	(Canada) CF Montréal	Transfer	US	$800,000 GAM	July 23, 2025	
44	DF	(Peru) Luis Abram	(Peru) Sporting Cristal	Released	Non-US	Contract Buyout	July 28, 2025	
3	DF	(Republic of Ireland) Derrick Williams	(England) Reading	Transfer	Non-US	Free	August 15, 2025	

==== Loan in ====
No.	Pos.	Player	Loaned From	US	Start	End	Source
6	DF	(Spain) Juan Berrocal	(Spain) Getafe	Non-US	July 25, 2025	June 30, 2026	

==== Loan out ====
No.	Pos.	Player	Loaned to	Start	End	Source
70	MF	(Colombia) Edwin Mosquera	(Colombia) Millonarios	July 11, 2025	June 30, 2026	
24	DF	(United States) Noah Cobb	(United States) Colorado Rapids	July 25, 2025	End of season	

==== SuperDraft picks ====
2025 Atlanta United SuperDraft Picks
Round	Selection	Player	Position	College	Status
2	53	(New Zealand) Ronan Wynne	DF	Denver	Non-US
3	83	(Norway) William Kulvik	DF	Maryland	Non-US

== Competitions ==
=== Overview ===
Competition	First match	Last match	Starting round	Final position	Record							
Competition	First match	Last match	Starting round	Final position	Pld	W	D	L	GF	GA	GD	Win %
Major League Soccer	February 22	October 18	Matchday 1	14th	34	5	13	16	38	63	−25	14.71
Leagues Cup	July 30	August 6	League stage	14th	3	1	0	2	7	7	+0	33.33
Total					37	6	13	18	45	70	−25	16.22

Last updated: 11 October 2025
Source: ESPN

Win Draw Loss

=== Non-competitive ===
==== Pre-season exhibitions ====
January 25 1	Chattanooga FC	2–1	Atlanta United FC	Chattanooga, TN
3:00 PM EST	Ibarra 82'; Trialist 87'	Report	Wynne 80'	Stadium: Finley Stadium

February 1 2	Birmingham Legion	0–2	Atlanta United FC	Birmingham, AL
4:30 PM EST		Report	Togashi 25'; Vellios 81' (o.g.)	Stadium: Protective Stadium

February 8 3	Atlanta United FC	2–0	New England Revolution	Bradenton, FL
1:00 PM EST	Thiaré 33'; Klich 56'	Report		Stadium: IMG Academy; Referee: 0

February 12 4	Atlanta United FC	2–2	FC Cincinnati	Bradenton, FL
12:00 PM EST	Lobzhanidze 76'; Almirón 90+1' (pen.)	Report	Denkey 57'; Mboma Dem 85'	Stadium: IMG Academy; Attendance: 0

February 15 5	Atlanta United FC	3–2	FC Dallas	Marietta, GA
12:00 PM EST	Lobzhanidze 11', 58'; Mosquera 130'	Report	Abubakar 63'; Kamungo 132'	Stadium: Children's Healthcare of Atlanta Training Ground; Attendance: 0
Note: Match was played in three 45-minute periods

=== MLS ===
==== Standings ====
===== Eastern Conference =====
MLS Eastern Conference table (2025)
Pos	Team	Pld	W	L	T	GF	GA	GD	Pts
11	New England Revolution	34	9	16	9	44	51	−7	36
12	Toronto FC	34	6	14	14	37	44	−7	32
13	CF Montréal	34	6	18	10	34	60	−26	28
14	Atlanta United FC	34	5	16	13	38	63	−25	28
15	D.C. United	34	5	18	11	30	66	−36	26

Source: MLS
Rules for classification: 1) points; 2) total wins; 3) total goal differential; 4) total goals scored; 5) fewer disciplinary points; 6) away goal differential; 7) away goals scored; 8) home goals differential; 9) home goals scored; 10) coin toss (2 clubs tied) or drawing of lots (≥3 clubs tied)

===== Overall =====
Overall MLS standings table (2025)
Pos	Team	Pld	W	L	T	GF	GA	GD	Pts	Qualification
26	LA Galaxy	34	7	18	9	46	66	−20	30	Qualification for the CONCACAF Champions Cup round one (Note: As third place of Leagues Cup)
27	Sporting Kansas City	34	7	20	7	46	70	−24	28	
28	CF Montréal	34	6	18	10	34	60	−26	28	
29	Atlanta United FC	34	5	16	13	38	63	−25	28	
30	D.C. United	34	5	18	11	30	66	−36	26	

Source: MLS
Rules for classification: 1) points; 2) total wins; 3) total goal differential; 4) total goals scored; 5) fewer disciplinary points; 6) away goal differential; 7) away goals scored; 8) home goals differential; 9) home goals scored; 10) coin toss (2 clubs tied) or drawing of lots (≥3 clubs tied)

==== Results by round ====
Round	1	2	3	4	5	6	7	8	9	10	11	12	13	14	15	16	17	18	19	20	21	22	23	24	25	26	27	28	29	30	31	32	33	34
Stadium	H	A	H	H	A	H	H	H	A	A	H	A	A	H	H	H	A	A	A	A	A	H	H	H	H	A	H	A	H	H	A	A	A	H
Result	W	L	D	L	D	W	D	L	L	L	D	L	D	L	W	W	L	L	L	D	D	D	L	D	D	L	D	W	L	D	L	L	L	D
Position (East)	3	7	11	12	12	11	10	11	12	12	13	14	13	14	12	12	13	13	14	12	12	13	13	13	13	13	14	12	12	13	14	14	14	14

Updated to match(es) played on October 5, 2025. Source: MLS standings
A = Away; H = Home; W = Win; D = Draw; L = Loss; P = Postponed

==== Matches ====
February 22 1	Atlanta United FC	3–2	CF Montréal	Atlanta, Georgia
7:30 PM	Latte Lath 42', 63', (yellow card) 69'; Klich (yellow card) 80'; Mosquera 85', (yellow card) 90+1'	Report	Opoku (yellow card) 34'; Saliba 47', (yellow card) 80'; Owusu 71'	Stadium: Mercedes-Benz Stadium; Attendance: 65,520; Referee: Pierre-Luc Lauziere

March 1 2	Charlotte FC	2–0	Atlanta United FC	Charlotte, North Carolina
2:15 PM	Biel 50'; Zaha 54'; Bronico (yellow card) 61'; Agyemang (yellow card) 76'	Report	Muyumba (yellow card) 77'; Slisz (yellow card) 90+8'	Stadium: Bank of America Stadium; Attendance: 51,002; Referee: Rubiel Vaquez

March 8 3	Atlanta United FC	0–0	New York Red Bulls	Atlanta, Georgia
7:30 PM	Latte Lath (yellow card) 8'; Edwards (yellow card) 40'	Report	Valencia (yellow card) 13'; Choupo-Moting (yellow card) 86'	Stadium: Mercedes-Benz Stadium; Attendance: 42,562; Referee: Tori Penso

March 16 4	Atlanta United FC	1–2	Inter Miami CF	Atlanta, Georgia
7:00 PM	Latte Lath 11'; Amador (yellow card) 45'; Gregersen (yellow card) 62'; Mosquera (yellow card) 90+2'	Report	Messi 20'; Allen (yellow card) 42'; Picault 89'	Stadium: Mercedes-Benz Stadium; Attendance: 42,843; Referee: Drew Fischer

March 22 5	FC Cincinnati	2–2	Atlanta United FC	Cincinnati, Ohio
2:30 PM	Engel (yellow card) 9'; Kubo (yellow card) 28'; Yedlin (yellow card) 59'; Evander 70', 75'	Report	Reilly (yellow card) 28'; Latte Lath 50', (yellow card) 90+1'; Edwards (yellow card) 69'; Powell 88' (o.g.)	Stadium: TQL Stadium; Attendance: 23,120; Referee: Rosendo Mendoza

March 29 6	Atlanta United FC	4–3	New York City FC	Atlanta, Georgia
7:30 PM	Miranchuk 42'; Parks 62' (o.g.); Almirón 75'; Latte Lath 84'; Guzan (yellow card) 90+4'	Report	Wolf 15', 51'; Martínez 48' (pen.)	Stadium: Mercedes-Benz Stadium; Attendance: 42,518; Referee: Filip Dujic

April 5 7	Atlanta United FC	1–1	FC Dallas	Atlanta, Georgia
7:30 PM	Almirón 17' (pen.); Latte Lath (yellow card) 84'	Report	Musa 60'	Stadium: Mercedes-Benz Stadium; Referee: Ricardo Fierro

April 12 8	Atlanta United FC	0–1	New England Revolution	Atlanta, Georgia
2:30 PM	Klich (yellow card) 90+3'	Report	Gil 36' (pen.); Urruti (yellow card) 45+4'; Yusuf (yellow card) 77'	Stadium: Mercedes-Benz Stadium; Attendance: 41,879; Referee: Alexis Da Silva

April 19 9	Philadelphia Union	3–0	Atlanta United FC	Chester, Pennsylvania
7:30 PM	Glesnes (yellow card) 19'; Sullivan 27'; Lukić (yellow card) 45+3' (yellow-red card) 56'; Jean Jacques 50'; Baribo 84'	Report	Latte Lath (yellow card) 68'	Stadium: Subaru Park; Attendance: 18,327; Referee: Allen Chapman

April 26 10	Orlando City SC	3–0	Atlanta United FC	Orlando, Florida
7:00 PM	Muriel 42' (pen.); Freeman 51'; Pašalić 67'; Schlegel (yellow card) 90+6'	Report	Slisz (yellow card) 79'; Fortune (yellow card) 90+1'	Stadium: Inter&Co Stadium; Attendance: 20,184; Referee: Marcos de Oliveira

May 3 11	Atlanta United FC	1–1	Nashville SC	Atlanta, Georgia
2:30 PM	Almirón 20', (yellow card) 82'; Klich (yellow card) 43'; Slisz (yellow card) 78'	Report	Lovitz 66'; Pérez (yellow card) 90+4'	Stadium: Mercedes-Benz Stadium; Attendance: 41,893; Referee: Sergii Boiko

May 10 12	Chicago Fire FC	2–1	Atlanta United FC	Chicago, Illinois
2:30 PM	Cuypers 14' (pen.); Pineda (yellow card) 60'; Rogers (yellow card) 73'; Kouamé 86'	Report	Fortune (yellow card) 35'; Miranchuk (yellow card) 45+5'; Latte Lath (yellow card) 60'; Rogers 81' (o.g.)	Stadium: Soldier Field; Attendance: 22,741; Referee: Lukasz Szpala

May 14 13	Austin FC	1–1	Atlanta United FC	Austin, Texas
8:30 PM	Vázquez 55'	Report	Fortune (yellow card) 59'; Thiaré 90+2'	Stadium: Q2 Stadium; Attendance: 20,738; Referee: Malik Badawi

May 17 14	Atlanta United FC	0–1	Philadelphia Union	Atlanta, Georgia
7:30 PM	Abram (yellow card) 57'; Mosquera (yellow card) 90+3'	Report	Bedoya (yellow card) 21'; Damiani (yellow card) 49'; Baribo 59' (pen.); Wagner (yellow card) 89'	Stadium: Mercedes-Benz Stadium; Attendance: 40,974; Referee: Chris Penso

May 25 15	Atlanta United FC	4–2	FC Cincinnati	Atlanta, Georgia
7:00 PM	Williams 15'; Fortune 20'; Slisz 66'; Thiaré 90+4'	Report	Robinson (yellow card) 15', (goal) 48'; Nwobodo (yellow card) 38'; Valenzuela 70'; Yedlin (yellow card) 90'	Stadium: Mercedes-Benz Stadium; Attendance: 40,919; Referee: Guido Gonzales Jr.

May 28 16	Atlanta United FC	3–2	Orlando City SC	Atlanta, Georgia
7:30 PM	Miranchuk 19'; Slisz (yellow card) 63', (goal) 83'; Klich (yellow card) 79'; Fortune (yellow card) 82'; Thiaré 90+5'	Report	Araújo 4', (red card) 77'; Enrique 32'; Atuesta (yellow card) 90+1'; Gallese (yellow card) 90+3'	Stadium: Mercedes-Benz Stadium; Attendance: 39,275; Referee: Filip Dujic

May 31 17	New York Red Bulls	2–0	Atlanta United FC	Harrison, New Jersey
7:30 PM	Harper 3'; Duncan (yellow card) 26'; Choupo-Moting 29'; Edelman (yellow card) 45'; Hack (yellow card) 61'; Edwards (yellow card) 90+6'	Report	Edwards (yellow card) 34'; Slisz (yellow card) 78'	Stadium: Sports Illustrated Stadium; Attendance: 20,187; Referee: Marcos de Oliveira

June 12 18	New York City FC	4–0	Atlanta United FC	New York, New York
7:30 PM	Moralez 44'; Bakrar 55'; Wolf 57', 59'	Report		Stadium: Yankee Stadium; Attendance: 18,062; Referee: Sergii Boiko

June 25 19	Columbus Crew	3–1	Atlanta United FC	Columbus, Ohio
7:30 PM	Herrera 23', (yellow card) 50'; Russell-Rowe 32', 42'	Report	Latte Lath (yellow card) 45+1'; Lennon 56'; Reilly (yellow card) 73'; Morales (yellow card) 81'; Slisz (yellow card) 88'	Stadium: Lower.com Field; Attendance: 20,420; Referee: Victor Rivas

July 5 20	D.C. United	0–0	Atlanta United FC	Washington, D.C.
7:30 PM	Schnegg (yellow card) 65'	Report	Lennon (yellow card) 13'; Morales (yellow card) 19'; Reilly (yellow card) 87'; Brennan (yellow card) 90+1'	Stadium: Audi Field; Attendance: 16,003; Referee: Guido Gonzales Jr.

July 12 21	Toronto FC	1–1	Atlanta United FC	Toronto, Ontario
7:30 PM	Flores (yellow card) 45+6', (goal) 48'; Rosted (yellow card) 63'; Spicer (yellow card) 82'; Petretta (yellow card) 88'; Longstaff (yellow card) 90+12'	Report	Thiaré (yellow card) 90+9'; Latte Lath 90+11' (pen.)	Stadium: BMO Field; Attendance: 23,100; Referee: Jon Freemon

July 16 22	Atlanta United FC	2–2	Chicago Fire FC	Atlanta, Georgia
7:30 PM	Amador (yellow card) 31'; Miranchuk 59'; Slisz (yellow card) 83'; Reilly 90+4'	Report	Zinckernagel 2'; Oregel (yellow card) 28'; D'Avilla (yellow card) 35'; Haile-Selassie 79'	Stadium: Mercedes-Benz Stadium; Attendance: 38,882; Referee: Sergii Demianchuk

July 19 23	Atlanta United FC	2–3	Charlotte FC	Atlanta, Georgia
7:30 PM	Muyumba 19'; Hernández (yellow card) 41'; Latte Lath 86'	Report	Biel (yellow card) 36', (goal) 77'; Toklomati 46'; Zaha 59'	Stadium: Mercedes-Benz Stadium; Attendance: 60,005; Referee: Allen Chapman

July 26 24	Atlanta United FC	2–2	Seattle Sounders FC	Atlanta, Georgia
7:30 PM	Gregersen (yellow card) 5'; Yeimar 7' (o.g.); Muyumba (yellow card) 73'; Miranchuk 90+9'	Report	de la Vega 54'; Baker-Whiting (yellow card) 72'; Ragen (yellow card) 88'; De Rosario 90+5'	Stadium: Mercedes-Benz Stadium; Attendance: 40,409; Referee: Ramy Touchan

August 9 25	CF Montréal	1–1	Atlanta United FC	Montreal, Quebec
7:30 PM	Morales (yellow card) 10'; Sealy 40'; Owusu (yellow card) 59'	Report	Lennon (yellow card) 44'; Hernández (yellow card) 58'; Williams (yellow card) 79'; Miranchuk 87'	Stadium: Saputo Stadium; Attendance: 16,029; Referee: Rosendo Mendoza

August 16 26	Colorado Rapids	3–1	Atlanta United FC	Commerce City, Colorado
9:30 PM	Yapi 18'; Murphy (yellow card) 47'; Navarro 64' (pen.), 71'; Cannon (yellow card) 90+6'	Report	Miranchuk 20'	Stadium: Dick's Sporting Goods Park; Attendance: 16,117; Referee: Victor Rivas

August 24 27	Atlanta United FC	0–0	Toronto FC	Atlanta, Georgia
5:00 PM	Alzate (yellow card) 65'; Slisz (yellow card) 70'; Almirón (yellow card) 82'	Report	Coello (yellow card) 84'	Stadium: Mercedes-Benz Stadium; Attendance: 39,509; Referee: Lorenzo Hernandez

August 30 28	Nashville SC	0–1	Atlanta United FC	Nashville, Tennessee
8:30 PM	Najar (yellow card) 37'; Palacios (yellow card) 71'	Report	Hernández 24', (yellow card) 58'; Thiaré (yellow card) 43'; Amador (yellow card) 53'; Hibbert (yellow card) 62'; Slisz (yellow card) 76'; Almirón (yellow card) 79'; Miranchuk (yellow card) 90+4'	Stadium: Geodis Park; Referee: Ismir Pekmic

September 13 29	Atlanta United FC	4–5	Columbus Crew	Atlanta, Georgia
7:30 PM	Almirón 45+3' (pen.); Amador 46'; Thiaré 50', 88'; Alzate (yellow card) 75'	Report	Rossi 14', 16', 39'; Abou Ali 25'; Herrera 39'; Cheberko (yellow card) 45+2'; Schulte (yellow card) 90+6'	Stadium: Mercedes-Benz Stadium; Attendance: 41,089; Referee: Jon Freemon

September 20 30	Atlanta United FC	1–1	San Diego FC	Atlanta, Georgia
4:30 PM	Almirón 61', (yellow card) 90'	Report	Lozano (yellow card) 6'; Dreyer 32'	Stadium: Mercedes-Benz Stadium; Attendance: 43,499; Referee: Ricardo Montero

September 27 31	New England Revolution	2–0	Atlanta United FC	Foxborough, Massachusetts
7:30 PM	Ceballos (yellow card) 10'; Oyirwoth (yellow card) 46'; Sands (yellow card) 70'; Turgeman 72'; Campana 75'	Report	Gregersen (yellow card) 50'; Amador (yellow card) 78'	Stadium: Gillette Stadium; Attendance: 25,790; Referee: Nabil Bensalah

October 5 32	Los Angeles FC	1–0	Atlanta United FC	Los Angeles, California
10:30 PM	Segura (yellow card) 18'; Choinière (yellow card) 64'; Bouanga 86'	Report	Slisz (yellow card) 90+3'	Stadium: BMO Stadium; Attendance: 22,067; Referee: Allen Chapman

October 11 33	Inter Miami CF	4–0	Atlanta United FC	Fort Lauderdale, Florida
7:30 PM	Messi 39', 87'; Alba 52'; Suárez 61'	Report		Stadium: Chase Stadium; Referee: Timothy Ford
Note: Match rescheduled from June 28 due to Inter Miami CF's participation in the 2025 FIFA Club World Cup knockout stage.

October 18 34	Atlanta United FC	1–1	D.C. United	Atlanta, Georgia
6:00 PM	Almirón 3'		MacNaughton (yellow card) 37'; Clark (yellow card) 43'; Hopkins (yellow card) 64'; Pirani 66'; Servania (yellow card) 82'	Stadium: Mercedes-Benz Stadium; Referee: Joshua Encarnación

=== U.S. Open Cup ===
Atlanta United FC did not send their senior squad or Atlanta United 2 to the 2025 U.S. Open Cup.

=== Leagues Cup ===
July 30 League Stage	Necaxa (Mexico)	3–1	(United States) Atlanta United FC	Atlanta, Georgia
7:30 PM	Guzan 12' (o.g.); de Buen (yellow card) 65'; Badaloni 77', 90+1'	Report	Miranchuk 28'; Hernández (yellow card) 40'; Brennan (yellow card) 59'	Stadium: Mercedes-Benz Stadium; Attendance: 30,847; Referee: Marco Ortiz

August 2 League Stage	UNAM (Mexico)	3–2	(United States) Atlanta United FC	Orlando, Florida
9:00 PM	Angulo 23' (pen.); Carrasquilla (yellow card) 45', (goal) 62', 89'; Martínez (yellow card) 90+2'; Navas (red card) 90+5'	Report	Hernández (yellow card) 30'; Navas 35' (o.g.); Gregersen (yellow card) 39'; Latte Lath 43'; Sessock (yellow card) 86'; Slisz (yellow card) 90+13'	Stadium: Inter&Co Stadium; Attendance: 15,772; Referee: Keylor Herrera Villalobos

August 6 League Stage	Atlanta United FC (United States)	4–1	(Mexico) Atlas	Atlanta, Georgia
7:30 PM	Thiaré 8' (pen.); Miranchuk 33'; Brennan (yellow card) 37'; Lobjanidze 38'; Hernández (yellow card) 51'; Lennon (yellow card) 59'; Hibbert (yellow card) 65'; Togashi 68'; Reilly (yellow card) 70'	Report	G. Aguirre (yellow card) 37'; Ferrareis (yellow card) 37'; E. Aguirre (yellow card) 51'; Đurđević (yellow card) 51'; González 83'	Stadium: Mercedes-Benz Stadium; Attendance: 22,342; Referee: Katia García

== Statistics ==
=== Top scorers ===
As of October 19, 2025

Place	Position	Name	MLS	Playoffs	Leagues Cup	Total
1	FW	(Ivory Coast) Emmanuel Latte Lath	7	—	1	8
1	MF	(Russia) Aleksei Miranchuk	6	—	2	8
3	MF	(Paraguay) Miguel Almirón	6	—	0	6
3	FW	(Senegal) Jamal Thiaré	5	—	1	6
5	MF	(Poland) Bartosz Slisz	2	—	0	2
6	DF	(Portugal) Pedro Amador	1	—	0	1
6	MF	(Trinidad and Tobago) Ajani Fortune	1	—	0	1
6	DF	(Venezuela) Ronald Hernández	1	—	0	1
6	DF	(United States) Brooks Lennon	1	—	0	1
6	MF	(Georgia (country)) Saba Lobjanidze	0	—	1	1
6	MF	(Colombia) Edwin Mosquera	1	—	0	1
6	MF	(France) Tristan Muyumba	1	—	0	1
6	MF	(United States) Will Reilly	1	—	0	1
6	FW	(Japan) Cayman Togashi	0	—	1	1
6	DF	(Republic of Ireland) Derrick Williams	1	—	0	1
Own Goals			4	—	1	5
Total			38	—	7	45

=== Appearances and goals ===
As of October 19, 2025

No.	Pos	Player	Nat	MLS			Playoffs			Leagues Cup			Total		
No.	Pos	Player	Nat	App	St	G	App	St	G	App	St	G	App	St	G
Goalkeepers
1	GK	Brad Guzan	(United States)	26	26	0	—	—	—	2	2	0	28	28	0
42	GK	Jayden Hibbert	(Canada)	8	8	0	—	—	—	1	1	0	9	9	0
Defenders
2	DF	Ronald Hernández	(Venezuela)	21	16	1	—	—	—	3	3	0	24	19	1
3	DF	Derrick Williams (Note: Transferred to Reading during the season.)	(Republic of Ireland)	17	15	1	—	—	—	1	1	0	18	16	1
4	DF	Enea Mihaj	(Albania)	9	7	0	—	—	—	3	1	0	12	8	0
5	DF	Stian Rode Gregersen	(Norway)	18	18	0	—	—	—	3	3	0	21	21	0
6	DF	Juan Berrocal	(Spain)	10	5	0	—	—	—	0	0	0	10	5	0
11	DF	Brooks Lennon	(United States)	25	17	1	—	—	—	3	2	0	28	19	1
18	DF	Pedro Amador	(Portugal)	26	24	1	—	—	—	1	1	0	27	25	1
21	DF	Efrain Morales (Note: Transferred to CF Montréal during the season.)	(Bolivia)	5	5	0	—	—	—	0	0	0	5	5	0
24	DF	Noah Cobb (Note: Loaned to Colorado Rapids during the season.)	(United States)	13	3	0	—	—	—	0	0	0	13	3	0
44	DF	Luis Abram (Note: Contract buyout exercised on July 28.)	(Peru)	21	16	0	—	—	—	0	0	0	21	16	0
47	DF	Matthew Edwards	(United States)	20	14	0	—	—	—	0	0	0	20	14	0
50	DF	Dominik Chong-Qui (Note: Initially signed on a short-term loan from Atlanta United 2, then later signed a First Team Contract on April 4th.)	(United States)	3	2	0	—	—	—	0	0	0	3	2	0
55	DF	Salvatore Mazzaferro (Note: Signed on a short-term loan from Atlanta United 2 on August 6th.)	(Canada)	1	0	0	—	—	—	1	0	0	2	0	0
66	DF	Nyk Sessock (Note: Signed on two short-term loans from Atlanta United 2 on June 11th and August 1st. Eventually signed a full first-team contract on August 5th.)	(United States)	2	0	0	—	—	—	2	1	0	4	1	0
Midfielders
7	MF	Steven Alzate	(Colombia)	10	7	0	—	—	—	0	0	0	10	7	0
8	MF	Tristan Muyumba	(France)	24	15	1	—	—	—	3	2	0	27	17	1
9	MF	Saba Lobzhanidze	(Georgia (country))	33	23	0	—	—	—	3	2	1	36	25	1
10	MF	Miguel Almirón	(Paraguay)	31	31	6	—	—	—	2	2	0	33	33	6
13	MF	Leo Afonso	(Brazil)	3	1	0	—	—	—	1	0	0	4	1	0
20	MF	Luke Brennan	(United States)	14	6	0	—	—	—	3	2	0	17	8	0
28	MF	Will Reilly	(United States)	11	4	1	—	—	—	3	1	0	14	5	1
35	MF	Ajani Fortune	(Trinidad and Tobago)	15	8	1	—	—	—	0	0	0	15	8	1
43	MF	Mateusz Klich (Note: Waived on July 21.)	(Poland)	16	9	0	—	—	—	0	0	0	16	9	0
45	MF	Xande Silva (Note: Transferred to St. Louis City during the season.)	(Portugal)	7	2	0	—	—	—	0	0	0	7	2	0
48	MF	Cooper Sanchez	(United States)	2	1	0	—	—	—	1	0	0	3	1	0
59	MF	Aleksei Miranchuk	(Russia)	33	31	6	—	—	—	3	3	2	36	34	8
70	MF	Edwin Mosquera (Note: Loaned to Millonarios during the season.)	(Colombia)	10	0	1	—	—	—	0	0	0	10	0	1
99	MF	Bartosz Slisz	(Poland)	29	26	2	—	—	—	3	3	0	32	29	2
Forwards
14	FW	Jamal Thiaré	(Senegal)	28	9	5	—	—	—	3	2	1	31	11	6
19	FW	Emmanuel Latte Lath	(Ivory Coast)	30	25	7	—	—	—	2	1	1	32	26	8
30	FW	Cayman Togashi	(Japan)	7	0	0	—	—	—	2	0	1	9	0	1
33	FW	Patrick Weah (Note: Signed on a short-term loan from Atlanta United 2 on October 11.)	(Liberia)	1	0	0	—	—	—	0	0	0	1	0	0
Total				34		38 (Note: includes 4 own goals)	—		—	3		7 (Note: includes 1 own goal)	37		45 (Note: includes 5 own goals)
