= Xande Silva =

Portuguese footballer (born 1997)

Personal information
- Full name: Alexandre Nascimento da Costa e Silva
- Date of birth: 16 March 1997 (age 29)
- Place of birth: Porto, Portugal
- Height: 1.77 m (5 ft 10 in)
- Positions: Winger; forward

Team information
- Current team: Iraklis
- Number: 12

Youth career
- 2007–2008: Alverca
- 2008–2009: Belenenses
- 2009–2014: Sporting CP
- 2014–2015: Vitória Guimarães

Senior career*
Years	Team	Apps	(Gls)
2014–2018	Vitória Guimarães B	52	(4)
2015–2018	Vitória Guimarães	26	(1)
2018–2021	West Ham United	1	(0)
2020–2021	→ Aris (loan)	29	(4)
2021–2022	Nottingham Forest	8	(0)
2022–2023	Dijon	32	(6)
2023	→ Atlanta United (loan)	10	(2)
2024–2025	Atlanta United	30	(2)
2025	St. Louis City	13	(0)
2025–2026	Hapoel Tel Aviv	21	(1)
2026–	Iraklis	4	(0)

International career
2012	Portugal U15	2	(1)
2012–2013	Portugal U16	11	(3)
2013–2014	Portugal U17	15	(4)
2014	Portugal U18	2	(1)
2015–2016	Portugal U19	21	(5)
2016–2017	Portugal U20	14	(5)
- * Club domestic league appearances and goals as of 20:14, 5 November 2026 (UTC)

Alexandre "Xande" Nascimento da Costa e Silva (born 16 March 1997) is a Portuguese professional footballer who plays as a winger or forward for Super League Greece club Iraklis.

In his career, he played for Vitória de Guimarães (first team and reserves), West Ham United, Aris, Nottingham Forest, Dijon and Atlanta United.

Silva was a youth international for Portugal.

== Club career ==
=== Vitória Guimarães ===
Born in Porto of Angolan descent, Silva joined Vitória de Guimarães' academy at the age of 17 after a five-year spell at Sporting CP. He started his senior career with the former's reserves, making his Segunda Liga debut on 17 August 2014 by coming on as a late substitute in a 1–0 away loss against Oliveirense. He scored his first goal in the competition the following 18 January, helping the hosts beat Benfica B 4–1.

Silva's first appearance in the Primeira Liga took place in the penultimate match of the season, and he played 11 minutes in a 0–0 home draw with Benfica after replacing Otávio. His maiden league goal occurred on 7 December 2015, in a 3–1 home defeat of Rio Ave.

=== West Ham United ===
Silva joined West Ham United for an undisclosed fee on 2 August 2018, signing a three-year contract and being recruited initially for the under-23 team. He scored a four-minute hat-trick on his Premier League 2 debut 11 days later, against Tottenham Hotspur.

Silva made his Premier League debut on 30 December 2018 in a 2–0 away defeat to Burnley, coming on as a second-half substitute for Marko Arnautović. He missed the start of the 2019–20 season due to illness; rushed into hospital in Portugal, he underwent emergency bowel surgery from which he was recuperating.

On 5 October 2020, Silva was loaned to Aris for the season. He scored his first goal in the Super League Greece on 2 December, his individual effort capping the 3–0 win at AEL.

=== Nottingham Forest ===
On 31 August 2021, Silva joined EFL Championship club Nottingham Forest on a two-year deal for an undisclosed fee. His maiden appearance took place on 15 September, when he replaced Lyle Taylor midway through the second half of an eventual 0–2 home loss against Middlesbrough.

=== Dijon ===
On 2 August 2022, Silva signed a three-year contract with Dijon for an undisclosed fee. He ranked second in his team in the scoring department at six (alongside Bryan Soumaré), but they were relegated from Ligue 2 after finishing third-bottom.

=== Atlanta United ===
In August 2023, Silva was loaned to Atlanta United of Major League Soccer for the remainder of the campaign. On 4 December, after starting in eight of his regular season appearances and scoring twice in the playoffs, a transfer option was exercised and he agreed to a two-year deal with the option of another year.

=== Later career ===
On 23 April 2025, St. Louis City acquired Silva. He moved to the Israeli Premier League in August, with Hapoel Tel Aviv. He was sent off just eight minutes into his debut for the latter, a 2–2 away draw against Maccabi Bnei Reineh. On 15 September 2026, Silva signed for Iraklis on a free transfer.

== International career ==
Silva was capped by Portugal at every youth level between under-15 and under-20. He was part of the under-17 squad that reached the semi-finals of the 2014 UEFA European Championship, and was named in the Team of the Tournament.

Two years later, Silva helped the under-19 team to the semi-finals of the 2016 European Championship in Germany. He was then selected by under-20 manager Emílio Peixe for the 2017 FIFA U-20 World Cup, where he scored in the quarter-final against Uruguay, which they lost after a penalty shootout.

== Personal life ==
Silva's father, Joaquim, was also a footballer. Also a forward, he spent most of his career in China and Portugal and represented the Angola national team.

== Career statistics ==
As of match played 23 April 2025

Appearances and goals by club, season and competition
Club	Season	League			National cup (Note: Includes Taça de Portugal, FA Cup, Greek Football Cup, U.S. Open Cup)		League cup (Note: Includes Taça da Liga)		Other		Total	
Club	Season	Division	Apps	Goals	Apps	Goals	Apps	Goals	Apps	Goals	Apps	Goals
Vitória Guimarães B	2014–15	Segunda Liga	23	2	–		–		–		23	2
Vitória Guimarães B	2015–16	LigaPro	8	1	–		–		–		8	1
Vitória Guimarães B	2016–17	LigaPro	10	1	–		–		–		10	1
Vitória Guimarães B	2017–18	LigaPro	11	0	–		–		–		11	0
Vitória Guimarães B	Total		52	4	0	0	0	0	0	0	52	4
Vitória Guimarães	2014–15	Primeira Liga	1	0	0	0	0	0	–		1	0
Vitória Guimarães	2015–16	Primeira Liga	20	1	1	0	0	0	0	0	21	1
Vitória Guimarães	2016–17	Primeira Liga	4	0	2	0	1	0	–		7	0
Vitória Guimarães	2017–18	Primeira Liga	1	0	0	0	0	0	1 (Note: Appearance in Supertaça Cândido de Oliveira)	0	2	0
Vitória Guimarães	Total		26	1	3	0	1	0	1	0	31	1
West Ham United U23	2018–19	Premier League 2	–		–		–		1 (Note: Appearance in EFL Trophy)	0	1	0
West Ham United	2018–19	Premier League	1	0	1	0	0	0	–		2	0
West Ham United	2019–20	Premier League	0	0	0	0	0	0	–		0	0
West Ham United	2020–21	Premier League	0	0	0	0	0	0	–		0	0
West Ham United	Total		1	0	1	0	0	0	0	0	2	0
Aris (loan)	2020–21	Super League Greece	29	4	4	0	—		0	0	33	4
Nottingham Forest	2021–22	Championship	8	0	2	0	0	0	–		10	0
Dijon	2022–23	Ligue 2	32	6	0	0	–		–		32	6
Atlanta United (loan)	2023	Major League Soccer	10	2	0	0	–		3 (Note: Appearances in MLS Cup playoffs)	2	13	4
Atlanta United	2024	Major League Soccer	23	2	1	0	–		4 (Note: Two appearances in Leagues Cup, two appearances and one goal in MLS Cup playoffs)	1	28	3
Atlanta United	2025	Major League Soccer	7	0	–		–		-		7	0
Atlanta United	Total		40	4	1	0	0	0	7	3	48	7
St. Louis City	2025	Major League Soccer	–		–		–		–		–	
Career total			188	19	11	0	1	0	9	3	209	22
