= 2021–22 Stade Rennais FC season =

Rennes
2021–22 season
- President: Nicolas Holveck
- Head coach: Bruno Génésio
- Stadium: Roazhon Park
- Ligue 1: 4th
- Coupe de France: Round of 32
- UEFA Europa Conference League: Round of 16
- Top goalscorer: League: Martin Terrier (21); All: Martin Terrier (21)
- Highest home attendance: 28,222 vs Lyon
- Lowest home attendance: 14,872 vs Rosenborg
- Biggest win: Rennes 6–0 Clermont; Rennes 6–0 Bordeaux
Home colours	Away colours	Third colours

The 2021–22 season was the 120th season in the existence of Stade Rennais and the club's 28th consecutive season in the top flight of French football. In addition to the domestic league, Rennes participated in this season's editions of the Coupe de France and the UEFA Europa Conference League.

== Players ==
=== First-team squad ===
As of 1 February 2022.

Note: Flags indicate national team as defined under FIFA eligibility rules; some limited exceptions apply. Players may hold more than one non-FIFA nationality.

No.	Pos.	Nation	Player
1	GK	FRA	Romain Salin
3	DF	FRA	Adrien Truffert
4	DF	FRA	Loïc Badé
6	DF	MAR	Nayef Aguerd
7	FW	FRA	Martin Terrier
8	MF	FRA	Baptiste Santamaria
9	FW	GUI	Serhou Guirassy
10	FW	GHA	Kamaldeen Sulemana
11	FW	BEL	Jérémy Doku
14	MF	FRA	Benjamin Bourigeaud (vice-captain)
16	GK	SEN	Alfred Gomis
17	FW	FRA	Loum Tchaouna
19	FW	FRA	Andy Diouf

No.	Pos.	Nation	Player
20	MF	FRA	Flavien Tait
21	MF	CRO	Lovro Majer
22	DF	FRA	Lorenz Assignon
23	DF	FRA	Warmed Omari
24	FW	FRA	Gaëtan Laborde
25	DF	NOR	Birger Meling
26	MF	FRA	Lesley Ugochukwu
27	DF	MLI	Hamari Traoré (captain)
28	MF	FRA	Jonas Martin
30	GK	COD	Pépé Bonet
31	DF	FRA	Jérémy Gelin
39	FW	FRA	Mathys Tel
40	GK	TUR	Doğan Alemdar

=== Out on loan ===
Note: Flags indicate national team as defined under FIFA eligibility rules; some limited exceptions apply. Players may hold more than one non-FIFA nationality.

No.	Pos.	Nation	Player
—	MF	CMR	James Léa Siliki (on loan to Middlesbrough until 30 June 2022)
—	MF	FRA	Yann Gboho (on loan to Vitesse until 30 June 2022)
—	FW	FRA	Franck Rivollier (on loan to Stade Briochin until 30 June 2022)

No.	Pos.	Nation	Player
—	FW	FRA	Matthis Abline (on loan to Le Havre AC until 30 June 2022)
—	FW	TUR	Metehan Güçlü (on loan to FC Emmen until 30 June 2022)

== Transfers ==
=== In ===
No.	Pos.	Player	Transferred from	Fee	Date	Source
22	DF	(France) Lorenz Assignon	Bastia	Loan return	1 July 2021	
31	DF	(France) Jérémy Gelin	(Belgium) Antwerp	Loan return	1 July 2021	
	FW	(Turkey) Metehan Güçlü	Valenciennes	Loan return	1 July 2021	
—	FW	(Senegal) M'Baye Niang	(Saudi Arabia) Al-Ahli	Loan return	1 July 2021	
4	DF	(France) Loïc Badé	Lens	€20M	5 July 2021	
18	FW	(Ghana) Kamaldeen Sulemana	(Denmark) Nordsjælland	€15M	16 July 2021	
25	DF	(Norway) Birger Meling	Nîmes	€3M	20 July 2021	
8	MF	(France) Baptiste Santamaria	(Germany) SC Freiburg	€14M	17 August 2021	
21	MF	(Croatia) Lovro Majer	(Croatia) Dinamo Zagreb	€12M	26 August 2021	
40	GK	(Turkey) Doğan Alemdar	(Turkey) Kayserispor	€3.5M	27 August 2021	
24	FW	(France) Gaëtan Laborde	Montpellier	€15M	31 August 2021	

=== Out ===
No.	Pos.	Player	Transferred to	Fee	Date	Source
8	MF	(France) Clément Grenier	Released		24 May 2021	
3	DF	(France) Damien Da Silva	Lyon	Free transfer	26 May 2021	
15	MF	(France) Steven Nzonzi	(Italy) Roma	End of loan	30 June 2021	
5	DF	(Brazil) Dalbert	(Italy) Inter Milan	End of loan	30 June 2021	
—	DF	(France) Lilian Brassier	Brest	€2M	30 June 2021	
—	FW	(United States) Jordan Siebatcheu	(Switzerland) Young Boys	€2.5M	30 June 2021	
19	MF	(France) Yann Gboho	(Netherlands) Vitesse	Loan	22 July 2021	
—	DF	(France) Sacha Boey	(Turkey) Galatasaray	€1M	26 July 2021	
—	FW	(France) Franck Rivollier	Stade Briochin	Loan	5 August 2021	
—	MF	(France) Rafik Guitane	Reims	Undisclosed	30 August 2021	
4	DF	(France) Gerzino Nyamsi	Strasbourg	€1.5M	30 August 2021	
34	DF	(France) Brandon Soppy	(Italy) Udinese	€2M	30 August 2021	
12	MF	(Cameroon) James Léa Siliki	(England) Middlesbrough	Loan	31 August 2021	
10	MF	(France) Eduardo Camavinga	(Spain) Real Madrid	€30M	31 August 2021	
17	DF	(France) Faitout Maouassa	(Belgium) Club Brugge	€4M	31 August 2021	
22	MF	(France) Romain Del Castillo	Brest	Undisclosed	31 August 2021	
—	FW	(Senegal) M'Baye Niang	Bordeaux	Free transfer	24 September 2021	

== Pre-season friendlies ==
Win Draw Loss Fixtures

10 July 2021 Friendly	Rennes	2–2	Le Havre	Dinard, France
18:00 CEST (UTC+2)	Salin (yellow card) 17'; Bourigeaud 41'; Guirassy 42'; Camavinga (yellow card) 73'	Report	Bonnet 18' (pen.); Thiaré 26'; Gomes (yellow card) 76'	Stadium: Stade Paul Audrin; Attendance: 1,000; Referee: Benoît Millot

17 July 2021 Friendly	Standard Liège	3–3	Rennes	Liège, Belgium
17:00 CEST (UTC+2)	Klauss 22' (pen.), 45+2'; Raskin 41'	Report	Bourigeaud 69' (pen.); Abline 74'; Tait 90'	Stadium: Stade Maurice Dufrasne; Referee: Laurent Conotte

21 July 2021 Friendly	Getafe	2–1	Rennes	Cartagena, Spain
19:00 CEST (UTC+2)	Ünal 17'; Duro 66' (pen.)	Report	Guirassy 57' (pen.)	Stadium: La Manga Club Football Center; Referee: Jorge Díaz Escudero

24 July 2021 Friendly	Levante	3–1	Rennes	San Pedro del Pinatar, Spain
18:00 CEST (UTC+2)	Soldado 1'; De Frutos 25'; Morales 33'	Report	Tait 56'	Stadium: Pinatar Arena Football Center; Referee: Salva Abril Portillo

31 July 2021 Friendly	Rennes	1–0	Torino	Rennes, France
18:00 CEST (UTC+2)	Terrier 27'; Ugochukwu (yellow card) 65'	Report	Linetty (yellow card) 45+1'; Pjaca (yellow card) 59'	Stadium: Roazhon Park; Attendance: 11,000

== Competitions ==
=== Overall record ===
Competition	First match	Last match	Starting round	Final position	Record							
Competition	First match	Last match	Starting round	Final position	Pld	W	D	L	GF	GA	GD	Win %
Ligue 1	8 August 2021	21 May 2022	Matchday 1	4th	38	20	6	12	82	40	+42	52.63
Coupe de France	18 December 2021	2 January 2022	Round of 64	Round of 32	2	1	1	0	2	1	+1	50.00
UEFA Europa Conference League	19 August 2021	17 March 2022	Play-off round	Round of 16	10	7	2	1	20	11	+9	70.00
Total					50	28	9	13	104	52	+52	56.00

Source: Soccerway

=== Ligue 1 ===
==== League table ====
Pos	Team	Pld	W	D	L	GF	GA	GD	Pts	Qualification or relegation
2	Marseille	38	21	8	9	63	38	+25	71	Qualification for the Champions League group stage
3	Monaco	38	20	9	9	65	40	+25	69	Qualification for the Champions League third qualifying round
4	Rennes	38	20	6	12	82	40	+42	66	Qualification for the Europa League group stage
5	Nice	38	20	7	11	52	36	+16	66 (Note: Nice were deducted one point for uncontrolled crowd trouble that caused the abandonment of their match against Marseille.)	Qualification for the Europa Conference League play-off round
6	Strasbourg	38	17	12	9	60	43	+17	63	

Source: Ligue 1
Rules for classification: 1) Points; 2) Goal difference; 3) Head-to-head points; 4) Head-to-head goal difference; 5) Head-to-head goals scored; 6) Head-to-head away goals scored; 7) Goals scored; 8) Away goals scored; 9) Fair-play points (Note: Head-to-head record is used only after all the matches between the teams in question have been played).

==== Results summary ====
Overall								Home						Away					
Pld	W	D	L	GF	GA	GD	Pts	W	D	L	GF	GA	GD	W	D	L	GF	GA	GD
38	20	6	12	82	40	+42	66	14	1	4	50	13	+37	6	5	8	32	27	+5

Source: Ligue 1

==== Results by round ====
Round	1	2	3	4	5	6	7	8	9	10	11	12	13	14	15	16	17	18	19	20	21	22	23	24	25	26	27	28	29	30	31	32	33	34	35	36	37	38
Ground	H	A	H	A	H	A	H	A	H	A	H	A	H	H	A	H	A	H	A	A	H	A	H	A	H	A	H	A	H	A	A	H	A	H	H	A	H	A
Result	D	D	W	L	L	L	W	D	W	W	W	D	W	W	W	L	W	L	L	L	W	L	W	L	W	W	W	W	W	D	W	L	L	W	W	L	W	D
Position	13	12	5	8	11	16	12	13	11	7	5	5	5	3	2	3	2	3	4	4	4	5	5	5	5	4	4	4	3	3	3	3	3	3	3	5	4	4

Source: Ligue 1
A = Away; H = Home; W = Win; D = Draw; L = Loss

==== Matches ====
The league fixtures were announced on 25 June 2021.

8 August 2021 1	Rennes	1–1	Lens	Rennes
13:00 CEST (UTC+2)	Sulemana 14'	Report	Fofana 19', (yellow card) 36'; Machado (yellow card) 55'	Stadium: Roazhon Park; Attendance: 22,567; Referee: Bastien Dechepy

15 August 2021 2	Brest	1–1	Rennes	Brest
15:00 CEST (UTC+2)	Honorat (yellow card) 39'; Brassier (yellow card) 44'; Le Douaron 90+1'	Report	Bourigeaud (yellow card) 44'; Ugochukwu (yellow card) 79'; Guirassy 84'; Traoré (yellow card) 88'	Stadium: Stade Francis-Le Blé; Attendance: 14,271; Referee: Benoît Bastien

22 August 2021 3	Rennes	1–0	Nantes	Rennes
17:00 CEST (UTC+2)	Traoré (yellow card) 11'; Terrier 58'; Sulemana (yellow card) 79'	Report	Blas (yellow card) 27'; Castelletto (yellow card) 57'	Stadium: Roazhon Park; Attendance: 27,569; Referee: Stéphanie Frappart

29 August 2021 4	Angers	2–0	Rennes	Angers
15:00 CEST (UTC+2)	Boufal 57'; Fulgini (yellow card) 84'; Cho 88'	Report	Badé (yellow card) 31' (yellow-red card) 43'	Stadium: Stade Raymond Kopa; Attendance: 6,473; Referee: Anthony Gautier

12 September 2021 5	Rennes	0–2	Reims	Rennes
15:00 CEST (UTC+2)	Aguerd (yellow card) 57'	Report	Ekitike 26'; Munetsi (yellow card) 60'; Koffi 66'; Gravillon (yellow card) 78'	Stadium: Roazhon Park; Attendance: 24,486; Referee: Thomas Leonard

19 September 2021 6	Marseille	2–0	Rennes	Marseille
17:00 CEST (UTC+2)	Dieng 48'; Harit 71'	Report	Badé (yellow card) 44'; Santamaria (yellow card) 64'	Stadium: Stade Vélodrome; Attendance: 54,188; Referee: Willy Delajod

22 September 2021 7	Rennes	6–0	Clermont	Rennes
19:00 CEST (UTC+2)	Martin 32'; Terrier 36'; Kamaldeen 55', 57', (yellow card) 66'; Laborde 64'; Tait 77'	Report	N'Simba (yellow card) 68'	Stadium: Roazhon Park; Attendance: 24,109; Referee: Benoît Bastien

26 September 2021 8	Bordeaux	1–1	Rennes	Bordeaux
13:00 CEST (UTC+2)	Mexer 88'; Fransérgio (yellow card) 90+4'	Report	Martin (yellow card) 17'; Omari (yellow card) 36'; Laborde 56'; Meling (yellow card) 80'; Santamaria (yellow card) 80'	Stadium: Matmut Atlantique; Attendance: 16,675; Referee: Hakim Ben El Hadj

3 October 2021 9	Rennes	2–0	Paris Saint-Germain	Rennes
13:00 CEST (UTC+2)	Laborde (yellow card) 24', (goal) 45'; Tait 46'; Martin (yellow card) 55'	Report	Kimpembe (yellow card) 55'; Donnarumma (yellow card) 56'; Mbappé (yellow card) 86'	Stadium: Roazhon Park; Attendance: 28,092; Referee: Ruddy Buquet

17 October 2021 10	Metz	0–3	Rennes	Metz
15:00 CEST (UTC+2)	Pajot (yellow card) 20'; Yade (yellow card) 64'; Amadou Mbengue (yellow card) 72'	Report	Omari (yellow card) 3'; Laborde 24'; Sulemana 37'; Terrier 45'	Stadium: Stade Saint-Symphorien; Attendance: 15,679; Referee: Benoît Millot

24 October 2021 11	Rennes	1–0	Strasbourg	Rennes
15:00 CEST (UTC+2)	Martin (yellow card) 6'; Aguerd 82'	Report	Le Marchand (yellow card) 32'; Caci (yellow card) 58'	Stadium: Roazhon Park; Attendance: 27,185; Referee: Stéphanie Frappart

31 October 2021 12	Troyes	2–2	Rennes	Troyes
15:00 CET (UTC+1)	Rami 38'; Dingomé 40'	Report	Aguerd 9'; Kamaldeen (yellow card) 30'; Terrier 81'	Stadium: Stade de l'Aube; Attendance: 8,550; Referee: Jérémy Stinat

7 November 2021 13	Rennes	4–1	Lyon	Rennes
20:45 CET (UTC+1)	Santamaria (yellow card) 25'; Omari (yellow card) 34'; Laborde 45'; Traoré 51'; Truffert 76', 83'	Report	Bruno Guimarães (yellow card) 40'; Slimani (yellow card) 51'; Paquetá 90+3' (pen.)	Stadium: Roazhon Park; Attendance: 28,222; Referee: Benoît Bastien

20 November 2021 14	Rennes	2–0	Montpellier	Rennes
21:00 CET (UTC+1)	Terrier 8'; Majer 28'; Tait (yellow card) 86'	Report	Savanier (yellow card) 3' (yellow-red card) 41'; Mollet (yellow card) 6'	Stadium: Roazhon Park; Attendance: 27,003; Referee: Mikael Lesage

28 November 2021 15	Lorient	0–2	Rennes	Lorient
15:00 CET (UTC+1)		Report	Majer (yellow card) 32'; Laborde 75'; Doku 78', (yellow card) 83'	Stadium: Stade du Moustoir; Attendance: 16,321; Referee: Bastien Dechepy

1 December 2021 16	Rennes	1–2	Lille	Rennes
21:00 CET (UTC+1)	Martin (yellow card) 65'; Bourigeaud 85'; Meling (yellow card) 90+1'	Report	Xeka 31'; Sanches 45'; Mandava (yellow card) 89'	Stadium: Roazhon Park; Attendance: 25,392; Referee: Stéphanie Frappart

5 December 2021 17	Saint-Étienne	0–5	Rennes	Saint-Étienne
13:00 CET (UTC+1)	Camara (yellow card) 72'	Report	Terrier 21', 27', 47'; Maçon 44' (o.g.); Ugochukwu 82'	Stadium: Stade Geoffroy-Guichard; Attendance: 11,257; Referee: Thomas Léonard

12 December 2021 18	Rennes	1–2	Nice	Rennes
15:00 CET (UTC+1)	Bourigeaud 59'	Report	Dolberg 19' (pen.); Atal 51'	Stadium: Roazhon Park; Attendance: 27,892; Referee: Willy Delajod

22 December 2021 19	Monaco	2–1	Rennes	Monaco
21:00 CET (UTC+1)	Ben Yedder 35' (pen.); Volland 72'; Maripán (yellow card) 80'; Tchouaméni (yellow card) 87'	Report	Truffert (yellow card) 13'; Terrier 16'	Stadium: Stade Louis II; Attendance: 5,354; Referee: Ruddy Buquet

8 January 2022 20	Lens	1–0	Rennes	Lens
21:00 CET (UTC+1)	Medina (yellow card) 16'; Saïd 89'	Report		Stadium: Stade Bollaert-Delelis; Attendance: 5,000; Referee: Benoît Bastien

16 January 2022 21	Rennes	6–0	Bordeaux	Rennes
13:00 CET (UTC+1)	Terrier 32'; Bourigeaud 43'; Meling (yellow card) 59'; Laborde 61'; Truffert 69'; Guirassy 89', 90+2'	Report	Sissokho (yellow card) 38' (yellow-red card) 50'; Lacoux (yellow card) 41'; Adli (yellow card) 50'; Oudin (yellow card) 70'	Stadium: Roazhon Park; Attendance: 4,951; Referee: Bastien Dechepy

23 January 2022 22	Clermont	2–1	Rennes	Clermont-Ferrand
15:00 CET (UTC+1)	Abdul Samed (yellow card) 44'; Da Cunha 60'; Tell 71'; Hountondji (yellow card) 90+1'	Report	Santamaria 19'; Truffert (yellow card) 65'; Martin (yellow card) 75'; Ugochukwu (yellow card) 86'	Stadium: Stade Gabriel Montpied; Attendance: 4,535; Referee: Thomas Léonard

6 February 2022 23	Rennes	2–0	Brest	Rennes
17:00 CET (UTC+1)	Martin (yellow card) 1'; Laborde 20'; Santamaria (yellow card) 31'; Terrier (yellow card) 59', (goal) 90'	Report	Del Castillo (yellow card) 52'	Stadium: Roazhon Park; Attendance: 25,409; Referee: Johan Hamel

11 February 2022 24	Paris Saint-Germain	1–0	Rennes	Paris
21:00 CET (UTC+1)	Mbappé (yellow card) 41', (goal) 90+3'; Verratti (yellow card) 89'	Report	Alemdar (yellow card) 90'	Stadium: Parc des Princes; Attendance: 47,000; Referee: Benoît Bastien

20 February 2022 25	Rennes	4–1	Troyes	Rennes
15:00 CET (UTC+1)	Guirassy (yellow card) 12', (goal) 14', 20'; Terrier 75'; Laborde 87' (pen.)	Report	Ugbo 39'; Chavalerin (yellow card) 49'; Tardieu (yellow card) 53'; Salmier (yellow card) 85'; Kaboré (yellow card) 90+1'	Stadium: Roazhon Park; Attendance: 22,967; Referee: Clément Turpin

25 February 2022 26	Montpellier	2–4	Rennes	Montpellier
21:00 CET (UTC+1)	Oyongo 19', (yellow card) 85'; Savanier (yellow card) 26'; Wahi 41'; Germain (yellow card) 74'	Report	Terrier 8'; Bourigeaud 15'; Traoré (yellow card) 28'; Laborde 52' (pen.); Omari (yellow card) 70'; Majer 84'	Stadium: Stade de la Mosson; Attendance: 11,000; Referee: Amaury Delerue

6 March 2022 27	Rennes	2–0	Angers	Rennes
15:00 CET (UTC+1)	Bourigeaud 33'; Aguerd (yellow card) 72'; Laborde 87'	Report	Ninga (yellow card) 71'	Stadium: Roazhon Park; Attendance: 27,693; Referee: Benoît Millot

13 March 2022 28	Lyon	2–4	Rennes	Décines-Charpieu
17:05 CET (UTC+1)	Mendes (yellow card) 11'; Ndombele (yellow card) 20'; Traoré 58' (o.g.); Dembélé 82' (pen.)	Report	Bourigeaud 11'; Santamaria 13'; Truffert (yellow card) 27'; Majer 45+1'; Terrier 49'; Doku (yellow card) 68'; Gomis (yellow card) 80'	Stadium: Groupama Stadium; Attendance: 46,597; Referee: Antony Gautier

20 March 2022 29	Rennes	6–1	Metz	Rennes
15:00 CET (UTC+1)	Terrier 18' (pen.), 27'; Guirassy 40', 54', 64'; Traoré 59'; Santamaria (yellow card) 82'	Report	Kouyaté (yellow card) 25'; Candé (yellow card) 70'; Mafouta 87'	Stadium: Roazhon Park; Attendance: 27,966; Referee: Willy Delajod

2 April 2022 30	Nice	1–1	Rennes	Nice
17:00 CEST (UTC+2)	Todibo (yellow card) 42'; Delort 67'; Kluivert (yellow card) 84'	Report	Terrier 78'; Traoré (yellow card) 84'	Stadium: Allianz Riviera; Attendance: 24,086; Referee: Benoît Bastien

9 April 2022 31	Reims	2–3	Rennes	Reims
17:00 CEST (UTC+2)	Munetsi (yellow card) 43'; Busi 60', (yellow card) 68'; Doumbia (penalty missed) 78'; Cajuste 80' (pen.)	Report	Bourigeaud 39', 43'; Terrier 58'	Stadium: Stade Auguste-Delaune; Attendance: 10,243; Referee: Romain Lissorgue

15 April 2022 32	Rennes	2–3	Monaco	Rennes
21:00 CEST (UTC+2)	Tait 3'; Omari (yellow card) 85'; Terrier 90+3' (pen.)	Report	Vanderson 12', (yellow card) 43'; Badiashile (yellow card) 46'; Ben Yedder 57'; Boadu 77'; Caio (yellow card) 84'	Stadium: Roazhon Park; Attendance: 28,336; Referee: Stéphanie Frappart

20 April 2022 33	Strasbourg	2–1	Rennes	Strasbourg
21:00 CEST (UTC+2)	Diallo 4'; Ajorque 77'; Caci (yellow card) 86'	Report	Terrier 54'; Martin (yellow card) 65'; Aguerd (yellow card) 90'	Stadium: Stade de la Meinau; Attendance: 25,148; Referee: Willy Delajod

24 April 2022 34	Rennes	5–0	Lorient	Rennes
13:00 CEST (UTC+2)	Bourigeaud 17'; Terrier 19'; Santamaria (yellow card) 26'; Traoré 47'; Aguerd (red card) 58'; Tait 79'; Laborde 90+3'	Report		Stadium: Roazhon Park; Attendance: 28,384; Referee: Benoît Millot

30 April 2022 35	Rennes	2–0	Saint-Étienne	Rennes
21:00 CEST (UTC+2)	Majer 41', 84'; Martin (yellow card) 61'	Report	Trauco (yellow card) 61'; Nadé (yellow card) 65'; Gourna-Douath (yellow card) 67'; Maçon (yellow card) 70'	Stadium: Roazhon Park; Attendance: 27,390; Referee: Jérémy Stinat

11 May 2022 36	Nantes	2–1	Rennes	Nantes
21:00 CEST (UTC+2)	Coulibaly 45'; Cyprien (yellow card) 67'; Pallois 71'; Blas (yellow card) 86'	Report	Tait 32', (yellow card) 90'	Stadium: Stade de la Beaujoire; Attendance: 26,359; Referee: Antony Gautier

14 May 2022 37	Rennes	2–0	Marseille	Rennes
21:00 CEST (UTC+2)	Bourigeaud 12'; Tait (yellow card) 27'; Majer 35'	Report	Ćaleta-Car (yellow card) 64'; Gueye (yellow card) 70'	Stadium: Roazhon Park; Attendance: 28,811; Referee: Benoît Bastien

21 May 2022 38	Lille	2–2	Rennes	Villeneuve-d'Ascq
21:00 CEST (UTC+2)	Weah 11', 88'; André (yellow card) 25'; Sanches (yellow card) 57'	Report	Bourigeaud 41'; Truffert (yellow card) 43'; Omari (yellow card) 54'; Guirassy 90+2'	Stadium: Stade Pierre-Mauroy; Attendance: 40,116; Referee: Amaury Delerue

=== Coupe de France ===
18 December 2021 Round of 64	Rennes	1–0	Lorient	Rennes
21:00 CET (UTC+1)	Omari 21'	Report		Stadium: Roazhon Park; Attendance: 19,636; Referee: Amaury Delerue

2 January 2022 Round of 32	Nancy	1–1 (4–3 p)	Rennes	Nancy
16:00 CET (UTC+1)	Biron 78'	Report	Guirassy (penalty missed) 28'; Doku 58'	Stadium: Stade Marcel Picot; Attendance: 5,000; Referee: Antony Gautier
	Penalties
	Bondo (penalty scored); Biron (penalty missed); Triboulet (penalty scored); Bertrand (penalty scored); Simões (penalty missed); Delos (penalty scored)		(penalty missed) Laborde; (penalty scored) Majer; (penalty scored) Martin; (penalty missed) Tel; (penalty scored) Santamaria; (penalty missed) Badé

=== UEFA Europa Conference League ===
==== Play-off round ====
The draw for the play-off round was held on 2 August 2021.

19 August 2021 First leg	Rennes (France)	2–0	(Norway) Rosenborg	Rennes, France
20:00 CEST (UTC+2)	Aguerd 15'; Badé (yellow card) 73'; Guirassy 84'	Report	Reitan (yellow card) 25'; Islamović (yellow card) 79'	Stadium: Roazhon Park; Attendance: 14,872; Referee: Radu Petrescu (Romania)

26 August 2021 Second leg	Rosenborg (Norway)	1–3 (1–5 agg.)	(France) Rennes	Trondheim, Norway
19:00 CEST (UTC+2)	Vecchia 68' (pen.)	Report	Del Castillo 5'; Meling (yellow card) 24'; Aguerd 41'; Gomis (yellow card) 67'; Abline 81'	Stadium: Lerkendal Stadion; Attendance: 5,116; Referee: Paweł Raczkowski (Poland)

==== Group stage ====
The draw for the group stage was held on 27 August 2021.

Pos	Team	Pld	W	D	L	GF	GA	GD	Pts	Qualification	REN	VIT	TOT	MUR
1	(France) Rennes	6	4	2	0	13	7	+6	14	Advance to round of 16	—	3–3	2–2	1–0
2	(Netherlands) Vitesse	6	3	1	2	12	9	+3	10	Advance to knockout round play-offs	1–2	—	1–0	3–1
3	(England) Tottenham Hotspur	6	2	1	3	11	11	0	7		0–3 (Note: The Tottenham Hotspur v Rennes match was awarded as a 3–0 win to Rennes due to numerous positive COVID-19 tests in the Tottenham Hotspur squad.)	3–2	—	5–1
4	(Slovenia) Mura	6	1	0	5	5	14	−9	3		1–2	0–2	2–1	—

Source: UEFA
Rules for classification: Group stage tiebreakers
Notes:

16 September 2021 1	Rennes (France)	2–2	(England) Tottenham Hotspur	Rennes, France
18:45 CEST (UTC+2)	Tait 23'; Laborde 72'; Martin (yellow card) 90+4'	Report	Badé 11' (o.g.); Højbjerg 76'; Gil (yellow card) 82'	Stadium: Roazhon Park; Attendance: 22,000; Referee: Halis Özkahya (Turkey)

30 September 2021 2	Vitesse (Netherlands)	1–2	(France) Rennes	Arnhem, Netherlands
21:00 CEST (UTC+2)	Wittek 30'; Tronstad (yellow card) 47'; Hájek (yellow card) 61'; Openda (yellow card) 68'; Bero (yellow card) 90+2'	Report	Santamaria (yellow card) 9'; Traoré (yellow card) 35'; Bourigeaud (yellow card) 45+1'; Guirassy 54' (pen.); Badé (yellow card) 56' (yellow-red card) 73'; Kamaldeen 70'; Assignon (yellow card) 90+2'	Stadium: GelreDome; Attendance: 14,571; Referee: Kevin Clancy (Scotland)

21 October 2021 3	Mura (Slovenia)	1–2	(France) Rennes	Maribor, Slovenia
18:45 CEST (UTC+2)	Lotrič 20'; Maruško (yellow card) 90+4'	Report	Guirassy 17' (pen.); Laborde 41'; Tchaouna (yellow card) 88'	Stadium: Ljudski vrt Attendance: 3,500; Referee: Volen Chinkov (Bulgaria)

4 November 2021 4	Rennes (France)	1–0	(Slovenia) Mura	Rennes, France
21:00 CET (UTC+1)	Badé 76'; Tchaouna (yellow card) 90+3'; Laborde (yellow card) 90+4'	Report		Stadium: Roazhon Park; Attendance: 23,115; Referee: Juri Frischer (Estonia)

25 November 2021 5	Rennes (France)	3–3	(Netherlands) Vitesse	Rennes, France
18:45 CET (UTC+1)	Laborde 9', 39', 69'; Omari (yellow card) 82'; Kamaldeen (yellow card) 88'	Report	Rasmussen (yellow card) 34'; Openda (yellow card) 40', (goal) 90'; Huisman 43'; Wittek (yellow card) 68'; Buitink 75'; Bazoer (yellow card) 90'	Stadium: Roazhon Park; Attendance: 23,081; Referee: Espen Eskås (Norway)

9 December 2021 6	Tottenham Hotspur (England)	0–3 (awd.)	(France) Rennes	London, England
21:00 CET (UTC+1)		Report		Stadium: Tottenham Hotspur Stadium; Referee: Horațiu Feșnic (Romania)
Note: The match did not take place due to numerous positive COVID-19 tests in the Tottenham Hotspur squad. On 20 December 2021, UEFA awarded a 3–0 win to Rennes.

==== Knockout phase ====
===== Round of 16 =====
The round of 16 draw was held on 25 February 2022.

10 March 2022 First leg	Leicester City (England)	2–0	(France) Rennes	Leicester, England
20:00 GMT (UTC±0)	Albrighton 30'; Iheanacho 90+3'	Report	Traoré (yellow card) 34'	Stadium: King Power Stadium; Attendance: 25,848; Referee: Orel Grinfeld (Israel)

17 March 2022 Second leg	Rennes (France)	2–1 (2–3 agg.)	(England) Leicester City	Rennes, France
18:45 CET (UTC+1)	Bourigeaud 8', (yellow card) 74'; Laborde (yellow card) 47'; Aguerd (yellow card) 71'; Tait 76'; Omari (yellow card) 90+6'; Traoré (yellow card) 90+8'	Report	Fofana 51'; Iheanacho (yellow card) 90+5'; Maddison (yellow card) 90+8'; Dewsbury-Hall (yellow card) 90+8'; Vestergaard (yellow card) 90+8'	Stadium: Roazhon Park; Attendance: 27,000; Referee: Anastasios Sidiropoulos (Greece)

== Statistics ==
=== Appearances and goals ===
No.	Pos	Nat	Player	Total		Ligue 1		Coupe de France		UEFA Conference League	
No.	Pos	Nat	Player	Apps	Goals	Apps	Goals	Apps	Goals	Apps	Goals
Goalkeepers
1	GK	(France) FRA	Romain Salin	4	0	1	0	1	0	2	0
16	GK	(Senegal) SEN	Alfred Gomis	32	0	25	0	0+1	0	6	0
30	GK	(Democratic Republic of the Congo) COD	Pépé Bonet	0	0	0	0	0	0	0	0
40	GK	(Turkey) TUR	Doğan Alemdar	14	0	12	0	1	0	1	0
Defenders
3	DF	(France) FRA	Adrien Truffert	41	3	18+12	3	2	0	6+3	0
4	DF	(France) FRA	Loïc Badé	21	1	11+3	0	2	0	5	1
6	DF	(Morocco) MAR	Nayef Aguerd	40	4	31	2	0	0	9	2
22	DF	(France) FRA	Lorenz Assignon	26	0	5+15	0	1+1	0	1+3	0
23	MF	(France) FRA	Warmed Omari	40	1	31+3	0	1	1	4+1	0
25	MF	(Norway) NOR	Birger Meling	37	0	20+11	0	0	0	3+3	0
27	DF	(Mali) MLI	Hamari Traoré	42	3	33	3	1	0	8	0
31	DF	(France) FRA	Jérémy Gelin	0	0	0	0	0	0	0	0
Midfielders
8	MF	(France) FRA	Baptiste Santamaria	45	2	28+6	2	1+1	0	9	0
14	MF	(France) FRA	Benjamin Bourigeaud	48	12	38	11	1	0	9	1
20	MF	(France) FRA	Flavien Tait	39	7	24+4	5	2	0	6+3	2
21	MF	(Croatia) CRO	Lovro Majer	36	6	21+8	6	2	0	3+2	0
26	MF	(France) FRA	Lesley Ugochukwu	22	1	3+15	1	0	0	1+3	0
28	MF	(France) FRA	Jonas Martin	35	1	24+5	1	2	0	2+2	0
33	MF	(France) FRA	Jeanuël Belocian	1	0	0+1	0	0	0	0	0
Forwards
7	FW	(France) FRA	Martin Terrier	46	21	37	21	1	0	5+3	0
9	FW	(Guinea) GUI	Serhou Guirassy	48	12	7+30	9	1+1	0	5+4	3
10	FW	(Ghana) GHA	Kamaldeen Sulemana	27	5	11+9	4	0+1	0	4+2	1
11	FW	(Belgium) BEL	Jérémy Doku	18	2	4+10	1	1	1	2+1	0
17	FW	(France) FRA	Loum Tchaouna	14	0	0+10	0	0	0	1+3	0
19	FW	(France) FRA	Andy Diouf	6	0	0+5	0	0+1	0	0	0
24	FW	(France) FRA	Gaëtan Laborde	45	17	32+4	12	2	0	6+1	5
39	FW	(France) FRA	Mathys Tel	10	0	0+7	0	0+1	0	0+2	0
Players transferred out during the season
10	MF	(France) FRA	Eduardo Camavinga	6	0	1+3	0	0	0	0+2	0
13	FW	(France) FRA	Junior Kadile	1	0	0	0	0+1	0	0	0
18	FW	(France) FRA	Matthis Abline	9	1	1+6	0	0	0	0+2	1
22	FW	(France) FRA	Romain Del Castillo	5	1	0+3	0	0	0	1+1	1

Last updated: 21 May 2022
Source: Competitions

=== Goalscorers ===
As of 9 April 2022

Rank	No.	Pos.	Nat.	Player	Ligue 1	Coupe de France	Europa Conference League	Total
1	7	FW	(France)	Martin Terrier	18	0	0	18
2	24	FW	(France)	Gaëtan Laborde	11	0	5	16
3	9	FW	(Guinea)	Serhou Guirassy	8	0	3	11
4	14	MF	(France)	Benjamin Bourigeaud	8	0	1	9
5	11	FW	(Ghana)	Kamaldeen Sulemana	4	0	1	5
6	6	DF	(Morocco)	Nayef Aguerd	2	0	2	4
6	20	MF	(France)	Flavien Tait	2	0	2	4
8	3	DF	(France)	Adrien Truffert	3	0	0	3
8	21	MF	(Croatia)	Lovro Majer	3	0	0	3
10	8	MF	(France)	Baptiste Santamaria	2	0	0	2
10	11	FW	(Belgium)	Jérémy Doku	1	1	0	2
10	27	DF	(Mali)	Hamari Traoré	2	0	0	2
13	4	DF	(France)	Loïc Badé	0	0	1	1
13	22	MF	(France)	Romain Del Castillo	0	0	1	1
13	23	DF	(France)	Warmed Omari	0	1	0	1
13	26	MF	(France)	Lesley Ugochukwu	1	0	0	1
13	28	DF	(France)	Jonas Martin	1	0	0	1
13	35	FW	(France)	Matthis Abline	0	0	1	1
Totals					67	2	17	82
