= Baptiste Santamaria =

French professional footballer (born 1995)

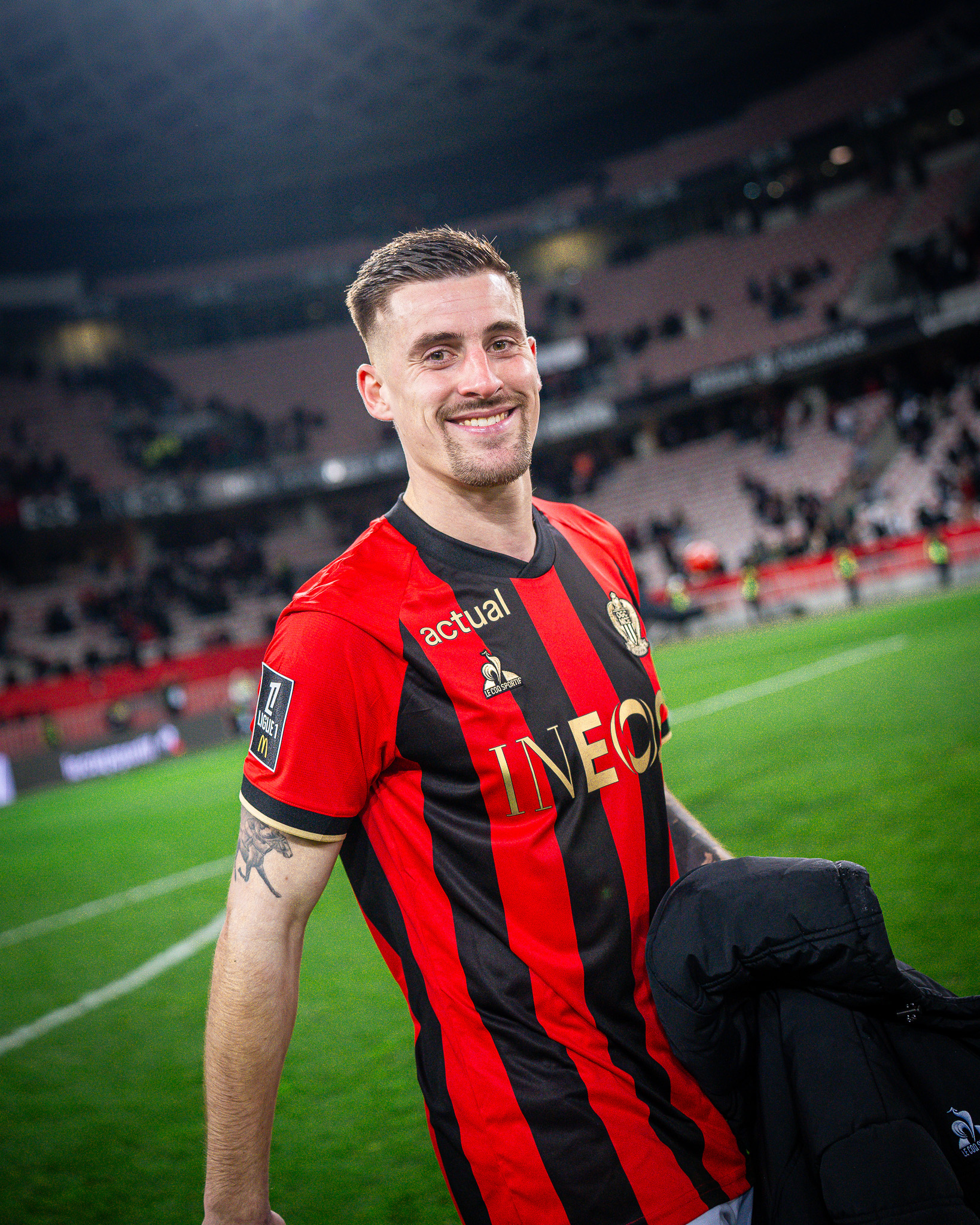
- Santamaria with Nice in 2025

Personal information
- Full name: Baptiste Santamaria
- Date of birth: 9 March 1995 (age 31)
- Place of birth: Saint-Doulchard, France
- Height: 1.83 m (6 ft 0 in)
- Position: Central midfielder

Team information
- Current team: PAOK
- Number: 7

Youth career
- 2001–2007: Ent. S. Justices Bourges
- 2007–2008: Bourges Foot
- 2008–2011: Bourges 18
- 2011–2013: Tours

Senior career*
Years	Team	Apps	(Gls)
2013–2015	Tours B	17	(3)
2013–2016	Tours	90	(14)
2016–2020	Angers	137	(2)
2020–2021	SC Freiburg	31	(1)
2021–2025	Rennes	99	(4)
2023	Rennes B	1	(1)
2025	→ Nice (loan)	13	(0)
2025–2026	Valencia	19	(1)
2026–	PAOK	4	(0)

International career
2015	France U20	3	(0)
- * Club domestic league appearances and goals as of 20 September 2026

Baptiste Santamaria (French: [batist sɑ̃tamaʁja]; born 9 March 1995) is a French professional footballer who plays as a central midfielder for Super League Greece club PAOK.

== Club career ==
Santamaria is a youth exponent from Tours. He made his Ligue 2 debut on 18 October 2013 against CA Bastia replacing Bryan Bergougnoux after 88 minutes in a 2–1 away win at the Stade Armand Cesari.

On 25 June 2016, Santamaria joined Ligue 1 side Angers after a transfer fee offer of €400,000 from Angers to Tours had previously been rejected by the latter.

In September 2020, Santamaria moved to Bundesliga club SC Freiburg after protracted negotiations with Angers. German sports magazine kicker reported the transfer fee as "about €10 million", the highest in SC Freiburg's history.

On 17 August 2021, Santamaria transferred to Ligue 1 club Rennes for a reported fee of €14 million.

On 22 January 2025, Santamaria was loaned to Nice for the remainder of the 2024–25 season, with an option to buy.

On 7 August 2025, Santamaria moved to La Liga club Valencia on a 2-year deal. He terminated his contract with the club by mutual consent on 13 July 2026.

On the same day, he moved to Super League Greece club PAOK as a free agent on a 1-year deal.

== Career statistics ==
As of 29 August 2025

Appearances and goals by club, season and competition
Club	Season	League			National Cup (Note: Includes Coupe de France)		League Cup (Note: Includes Coupe de la Ligue)		Continental		Total	
Club	Season	Division	Apps	Goals	Apps	Goals	Apps	Goals	Apps	Goals	Apps	Goals
Tours	2013–14	Ligue 2	23	4	0	0	1	0	—		24	4
Tours	2014–15	Ligue 2	35	4	3	0	1	0	—		39	4
Tours	2015–16	Ligue 2	32	6	3	0	2	0	—		37	6
Tours	Total		90	14	6	0	4	0	0	0	100	14
Angers	2016–17	Ligue 1	37	0	6	0	0	0	—		43	0
Angers	2017–18	Ligue 1	31	0	1	0	1	0	—		33	0
Angers	2018–19	Ligue 1	38	1	1	0	1	0	—		40	1
Angers	2019–20	Ligue 1	28	1	2	0	0	0	—		30	1
Angers	2020–21	Ligue 1	3	0	0	0	0	0	—		3	0
Angers	Total		137	2	10	0	2	0	0	0	149	2
SC Freiburg	2020–21	Bundesliga	30	1	1	0	—		—		31	1
SC Freiburg	2021–22	Bundesliga	1	0	1	0	—		—		2	0
SC Freiburg	Total		31	1	2	0	—		—		33	1
Rennes	2021–22	Ligue 1	34	2	2	0	—		9 (Note: Appearance(s) in UEFA Conference League)	0	45	2
Rennes	2022–23	Ligue 1	25	2	1	0	—		3 (Note: Appearance(s) in UEFA Europa League)	0	29	2
Rennes	2023–24	Ligue 1	30	0	5	0	—		7	0	42	0
Rennes	2024–25	Ligue 1	10	0	0	0	—		—		10	0
Rennes	Total		99	4	8	0	—		19	0	126	4
Rennes B	2022–23	National 2	1	1	—		—		—		1	1
Nice (loan)	2024–25	Ligue 1	13	0	1	0	—		—		14	0
Valencia	2025–26	La Liga	3	0	0	0	—		—		3	0
Career total			374	22	27	0	6	0	19	0	426	22
