= Franck Tchaouna =

Chadian footballer

Personal information
- Date of birth: 19 September 2005 (age 21)
- Place of birth: Rennes, France
- Height: 1.81 m (5 ft 11 in)
- Position: Forward

Team information
- Current team: Catanzaro
- Number: 25

Youth career
- TA Rennes
- 2023–2024: Concarneau
- 2024–2025: Salernitana

Senior career*
Years	Team	Apps	(Gls)
2025–2026	Enna	26	(14)
2026–	Catanzaro	0	(0)

International career^{‡}
2025–	Chad	2	(0)
- * Club domestic league appearances and goals as of 21 August 2026 ‡ National team caps and goals as of 18:42, 13 October 2025 (UTC)

Franck Tchaouna (born 19 September 2005) is a Chadian professional footballer who plays as a forward for Serie B club Catanzaro. Born in France, he plays for the Chad national team.

== Club career ==
A youth product of the academies of the French clubs TA Rennes and Concarneau, Tchaouna and his twin brother Franky joined the academy of the Italian club Salernitana on 14 December 2024. On 26 July 2025, the brothers moved to the Serie D club Enna. He debuted for Enna in a 1–1 (5–4) penalty shootout win over Acireale in the Coppa Italia Serie D on 24 August 2025, scoring one of the shootout goals.

== International career ==
Born in France, Tchaouna is of Chadian descent and holds dual French-Chadian citizenship. He was called up to the Chad national team for a set of 2026 FIFA World Cup qualification matches in September 2025. He debuted in a 1–1 tie with Ghana on 4 September 2025.

== Personal life ==
Franck's older brothers Haroun and Loum Tchaouna, and twin brother Franky Tchaouna are all professional footballers.
