= Martin Terrier =

French footballer (born 1997)

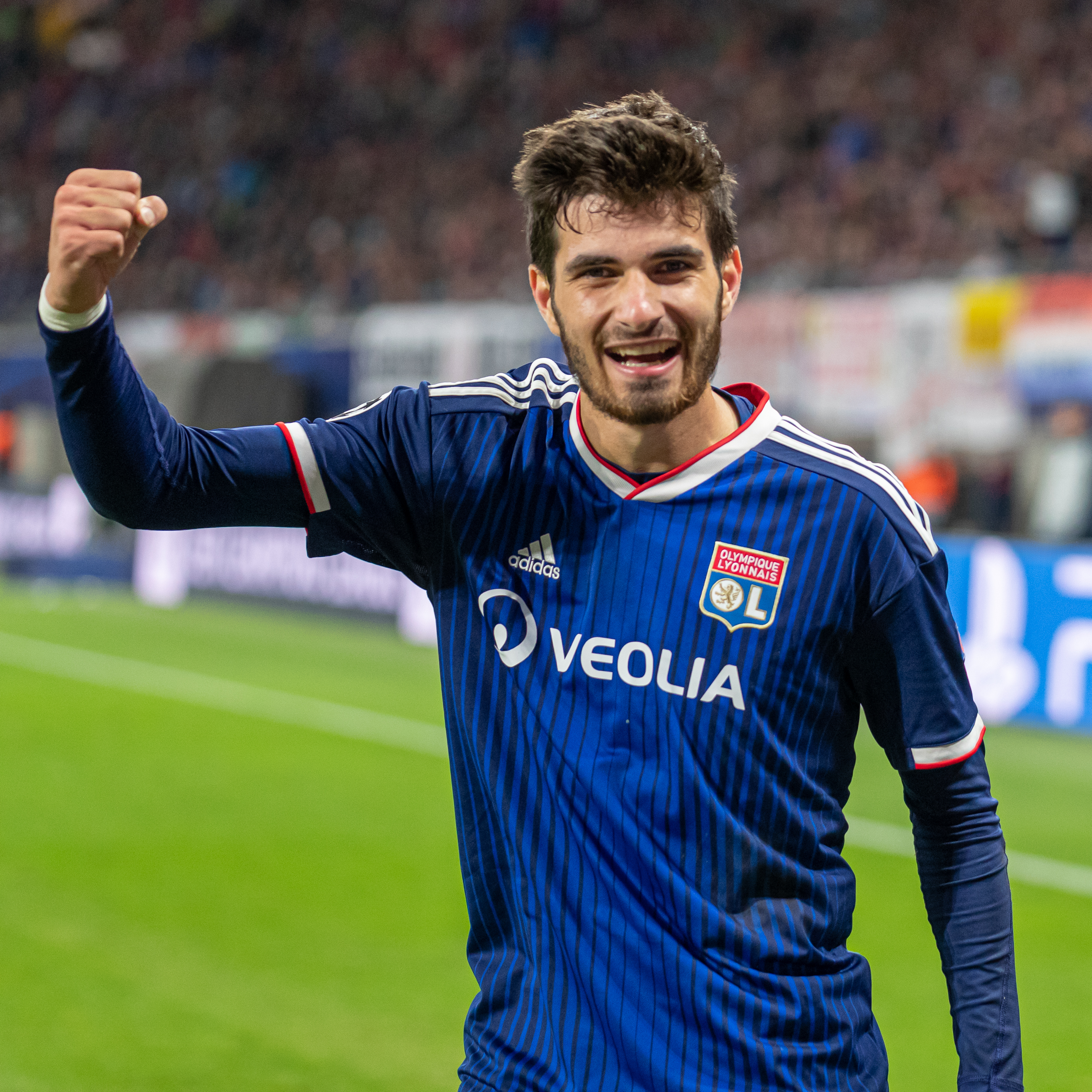
- Terrier with Lyon in 2019

Personal information
- Full name: Martin Albert Frédéric Terrier
- Date of birth: 4 March 1997 (age 29)
- Place of birth: Armentières, France
- Height: 1.84 m (6 ft 0 in)
- Positions: Winger; forward

Team information
- Current team: Bayer Leverkusen
- Number: 11

Youth career
- 2003–2004: SC Bailleul
- 2004–2016: Lille

Senior career*
Years	Team	Apps	(Gls)
2015–2017	Lille B	29	(6)
2016–2018	Lille	11	(1)
2017–2018	→ Strasbourg (loan)	25	(3)
2018–2020	Lyon	55	(10)
2020–2024	Rennes	111	(46)
2023	Rennes B	1	(0)
2024–	Bayer Leverkusen	35	(6)

International career
2017	France U20	4	(1)
2017–2019	France U21	13	(7)
- * Club domestic league appearances and goals as of 17:30, 10 October 2026 (UTC)

Martin Albert Frédéric Terrier (born 4 March 1997) is a French professional footballer who plays as winger or forward for Bundesliga club Bayer Leverkusen.

Terrier played over 200 games and scored over 60 goals in Ligue 1 for Lille, Strasbourg, Lyon and Rennes. He joined the last two clubs for €11 million and €12 million, respectively.

== Club career ==
=== Lille ===
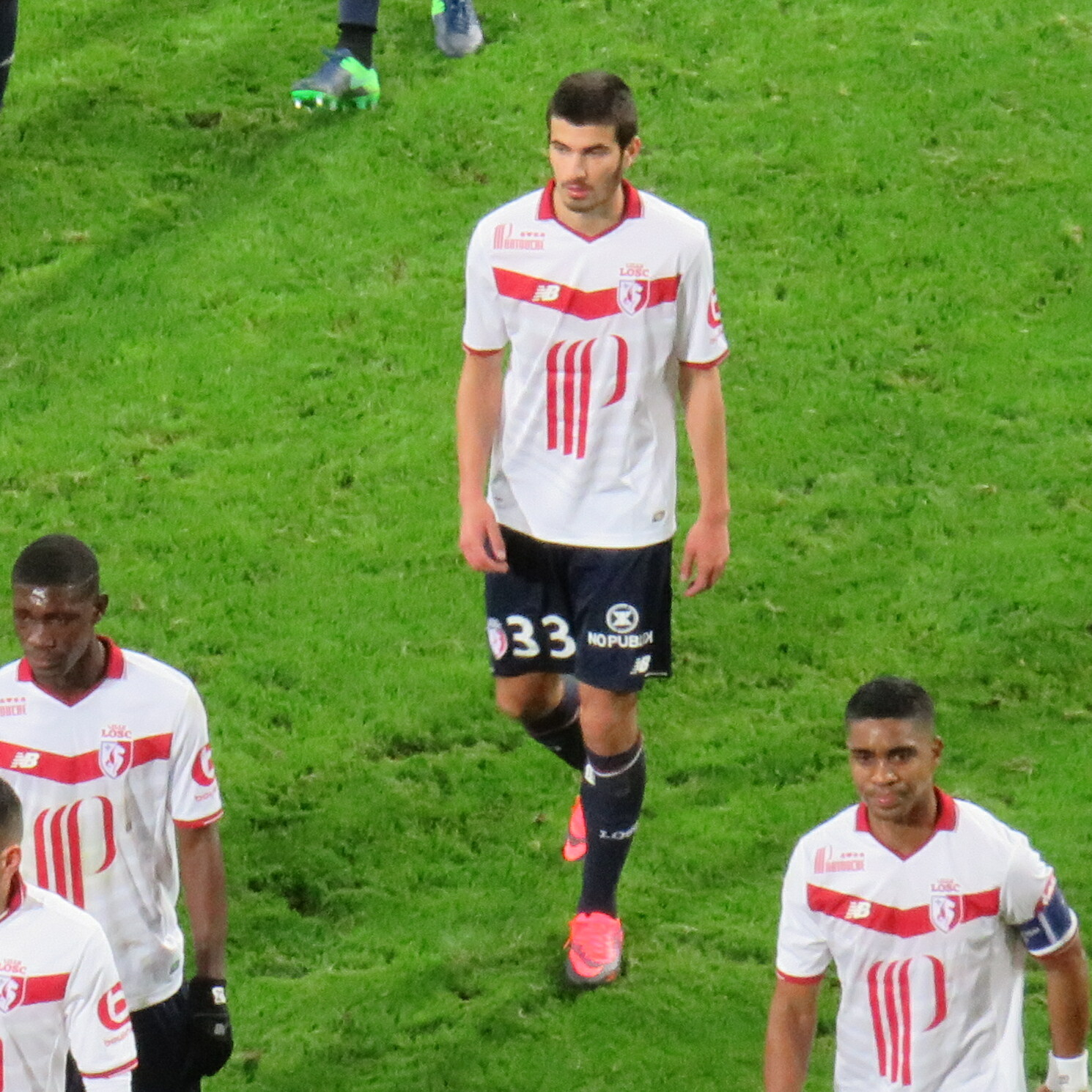
Terrier with Lille in 2016

Born in Armentières in 1997, Terrier started his football career with SC Bailleul youth team. He moved to Lille in 2004.

In 2016, Terrier was called up for the Lille first team. On 22 October, he made his Ligue 1 debut against Bastia at Stade Pierre-Mauroy, replacing Yves Bissouma in the 84th minute. On 14 December, he played the full match in the round of 16 of the Coupe de la Ligue in a 3–1 away defeat against Paris Saint-Germain. On 7 January 2017, he scored his first professional goal in the 90th minute of a 4–1 home win in the round of 64 of Coupe de France, against Excelsior. On 29 April, he scored his first goal in Ligue 1, as a substitute, in the 75th minute of a 3–0 away win over Montpellier.

On 18 August 2017, Terrier was signed by fellow Ligue 1 side Strasbourg on a season-long loan deal. On 27 August, he made his debut in a 2–0 away defeat against Guingamp, playing the full match. On 30 September, he scored his first goal as a substitute in the second minute of added time, in a 1–1 away draw against Dijon.

=== Lyon ===
On 26 January 2018, Terrier was sold by Lille to Lyon for €11 million, with a potential €4 million addition, with Lille keeping 10% of a future fee. He signed until the summer of 2022. Lyon loaned him straight back to Strasbourg so that he would finish his deal there. He scored on his debut for Lyon, opening a 2–0 home win over Strasbourg on 24 August.

He scored his first European goal on 2 October 2019 in a 2–0 win at RB Leipzig in the UEFA Champions League group stage, starting ahead of Moussa Dembélé and Jeff Reine-Adélaïde.

=== Rennes ===
On 6 July 2020, Rennes announced that Terrier had signed a five-year contract with the club, for a reported €12 million plus bonus fees. He made his debut on 22 August, playing the full 90 minutes of the season opener away to his former club Lille; a week later he was sent off in a 2–1 home win over Montpellier. He opened his account on 16 October with the first goal of a 1–1 draw at Dijon, eventually finishing the season with nine goals, including two at home to the same opponents in a 5–1 win on 25 April 2021.

In 2021–22, Terrier scored his first goal in the third match on 22 August, the only one of a Derby Breton win over Nantes at Roazhon Park. On 5 December, he scored his first hat-trick in a 5–0 win at Saint-Étienne. The season was the most prolific of his career with 21 goals, joint third in the league behind Kylian Mbappé and Wissam Ben Yedder and equal to Moussa Dembélé. He was the UNFP Player of the Month for March and made the Team of the Year.

Terrier scored his ninth goal of the 2022–23 Ligue 1 season to open a 2–1 home win over Nice on 2 January 2023, but suffered a right-knee anterior cruciate ligament injury through a collision with Jordan Lotomba, thereby being ruled out for the rest of the season. Previously, on 16 October, he scored two headers in a 3–2 home win over his former club Lyon, whom Laurent Blanc was managing for the first time.

On 5 October 2023, Terrier returned in a 1–0 loss away to Villarreal in the UEFA Europa League group stage. He came on with nine minutes remaining and missed a penalty in added time.

=== Bayer Leverkusen ===
On 18 July 2024, Bayer Leverkusen announced that Terrier had signed a five-year contract with the club, for a reported fee of around €20 million.

On 18 January 2025, during Bayer Leverkusen's 3–1 victory over Borussia Mönchengladbach, Terrier suffered a torn right achilles tendon, ruling him out for the remainder of the 2024–25 season. The injury occurred without any contact with an opponent, as his foot got stuck in the turf in the 8th minute of play.

== International career ==
Uncapped, Terrier was chosen by France under-20 for the 2017 FIFA World Cup in South Korea. On his debut on 22 May in the first group game, he came on as a 66th-minute substitute for Jean-Kévin Augustin, and 15 minutes later scored the final goal of a 3–0 win over Honduras. He played each other game of a run to the last 16, including the entirety of the final group game in which the French won 2–0 against New Zealand.

Terrier made his under-21 debut on 5 September 2017, in a 4–1 win over Kazakhstan in Le Mans, in 2019 UEFA European Championship qualification. On in the 57th minute for Adama Diakhaby, he scored a hat-trick. In his next three games, he scored once against Montenegro from the bench, twice as a starter against Luxembourg and again at home to Bulgaria, thereby scoring all seven of his under-21 goals in the first four of his 13 games.

== Career statistics ==
As of match played 15 October 2026

Appearances and goals by club, season and competition
Club	Season	League			National cup (Note: Includes Coupe de France, DFB-Pokal)		League cup (Note: Includes Coupe de la Ligue)		Europe		Other		Total	
Club	Season	Division	Apps	Goals	Apps	Goals	Apps	Goals	Apps	Goals	Apps	Goals	Apps	Goals
Lille B	2015–16	CFA 2	17	2	—		—		—		—		17	2
Lille B	2016–17	CFA	12	4	—		—		—		—		12	4
Lille B	Total		29	6	—		—		—		—		29	6
Lille	2016–17	Ligue 1	11	1	3	1	1	0	—		—		15	2
Strasbourg (loan)	2017–18	Ligue 1	25	3	3	1	1	0	—		—		29	4
Lyon	2018–19	Ligue 1	32	9	5	1	2	1	3 (Note: Appearances in UEFA Champions League)	0	—		42	11
Lyon	2019–20	Ligue 1	23	1	4	3	3	1	5	1	—		35	6
Lyon	Total		55	10	9	4	5	2	8	1	—		77	17
Rennes	2020–21	Ligue 1	34	9	1	0	—		3	0	—		38	9
Rennes	2021–22	Ligue 1	37	21	1	0	—		8 (Note: Appearances in UEFA Europa Conference League)	0	—		46	21
Rennes	2022–23	Ligue 1	16	9	0	0	—		6 (Note: Appearances in UEFA Europa League)	3	—		22	12
Rennes	2023–24	Ligue 1	24	7	4	1	—		7	1	—		35	9
Rennes	Total		111	46	6	1	—		24	4	—		141	51
Rennes B	2023–24	Championnat National 2	1	0	—		—		—		—		1	0
Bayer Leverkusen	2024–25	Bundesliga	15	2	0	0	—		4	0	1 (Note: Appearance in DFL-Supercup)	0	20	2
Bayer Leverkusen	2025–26	Bundesliga	18	4	3	1	—		3	0	—		24	5
Bayer Leverkusen	2026–27	Bundesliga	2	0	0	0	—		2	0	—		4	0
Bayer Leverkusen	Total		35	6	3	1	—		9	0	1	0	48	7
Career total			267	72	24	8	7	2	41	5	1	0	340	87

== Honours ==
Lyon

- Coupe de la Ligue runner-up: 2019–20

Bayer Leverkusen

- DFL-Supercup: 2024

Individual

- UNFP Ligue 1 Team of the Year: 2021–22
- UNFP Ligue 1 Player of the Month: March 2022, October 2022, January 2024
- Roazhon d'Or d'honneur: 2022–23 (honorary award)
