= Adama Fofana (footballer, born 1999) =

Burkinabé footballer

Personal information
- Date of birth: 11 October 1999 (age 27)
- Place of birth: Mankono, Ivory Coast
- Height: 1.73 m (5 ft 8 in)
- Position: Left back

Team information
- Current team: Kapaz
- Number: 14

Youth career
- Right to Dream Academy

Senior career*
Years	Team	Apps	(Gls)
2018–2021	Varbergs BoIS	75	(4)
2021–2024	Dijon	65	(0)
2022–2024	Dijon II	6	(0)
2024–2025	Adanaspor	18	(0)
2025–	Kapaz	22	(0)

International career^{‡}
2022–	Burkina Faso	1	(0)
- * Club domestic league appearances and goals as of 22 June 2026 ‡ National team caps and goals as of 02:54, 25 September 2022 (UTC)

Adama Fofana (born 11 October 1999) is a professional footballer who plays as a defender for Azerbaijan Premier League club Kapaz. Born in the Ivory Coast, Fofana plays for the Burkina Faso national team.

== Club career ==
Fofana attended the Right to Dream Academy before joining Swedish club Varbergs BoIS in 2018.

On 31 August 2021, he moved to Dijon in France on a three-year contract.

== Personal life ==
Born in the Ivory Coast, Fofana is of Burkinabé descent. He debuted with the Burkina Faso national team in a friendly 1–0 win over DR Congo on 23 September 2022.
