= Idrissa Camara (footballer) =

Senegalese footballer

Personal information
- Date of birth: 18 June 1998 (age 28)
- Place of birth: Dakar, Senegal
- Height: 1.79 m (5 ft 10 in)
- Position: Winger

Youth career
- 2011–2017: Sacré-Cœur

Senior career*
Years	Team	Apps	(Gls)
2017–2020	Sacré-Cœur		
2020–2022	Ümraniyespor	50	(9)
2022–2023	Dijon	22	(1)
2023–2025	Boluspor	15	(0)
- * Club domestic league appearances and goals as of 25 January 2025

Idrissa Camara (born 18 June 1998) is a Senegalese professional footballer who plays as a winger.

== Career ==
Camara is a product of the youth academy of the Senegalese club Dakar Sacré-Cœur since the age of 11. He began his senior career in the TFF First League with Ümraniyespor on 6 October 2020. In the 2021-22 season, he scored 7 times as the club came in second the TFF First League and achieved promotion to the Süper Lig. He transferred to the French Ligue 2 squad Dijon in the summer of 2022.

== Personal life ==
Camara was born in Senegal and is of Malian descent. His brothers Papa Bamory and Mamadou are also professional footballers.
