= Loum Tchaouna =

French footballer (born 2003)

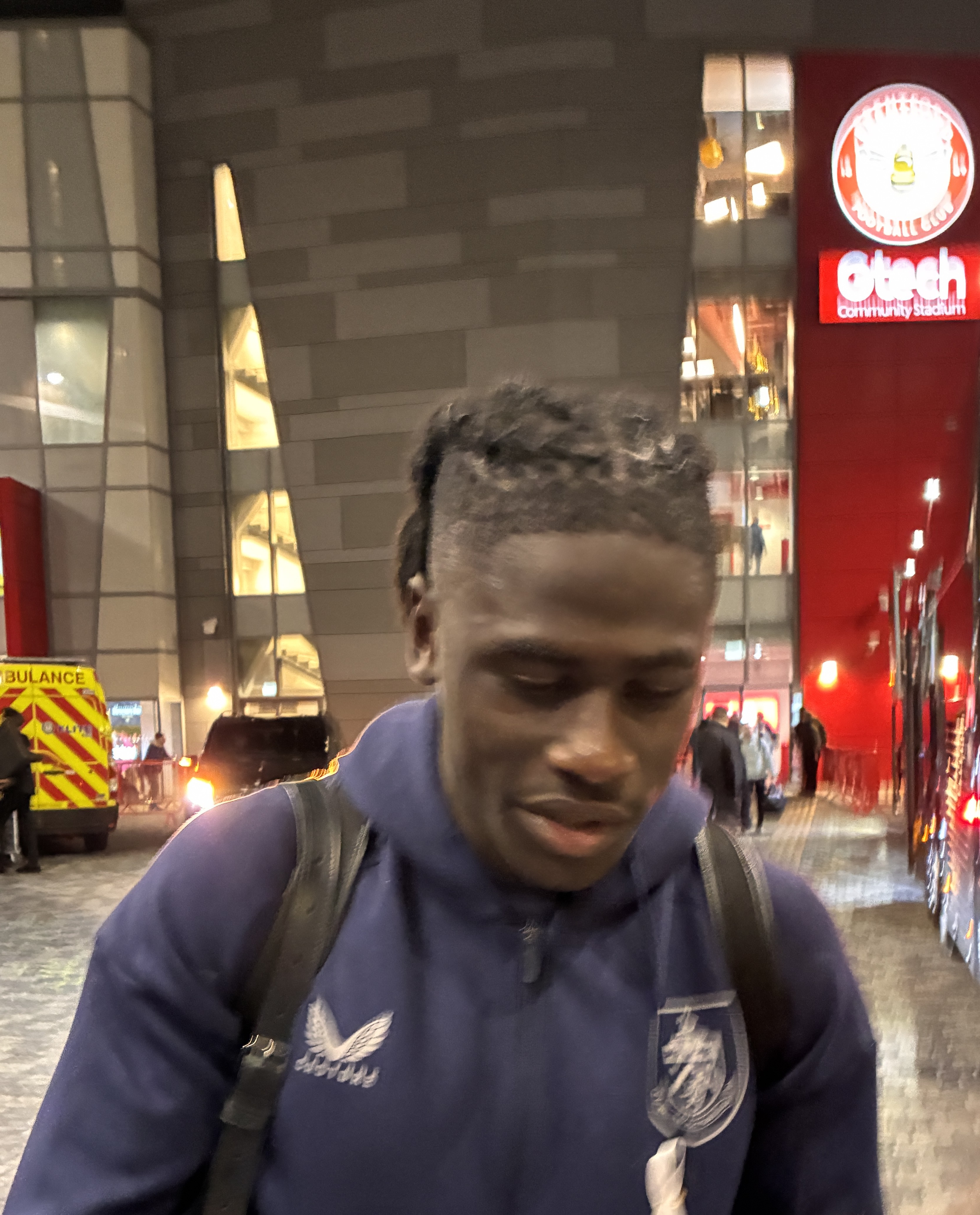
- Tchaouna with Burnley in 2025

Personal information
- Full name: Loum Tchaouna
- Date of birth: 8 September 2003 (age 23)
- Place of birth: N'Djamena, Chad
- Height: 1.80 m (5 ft 11 in)
- Positions: Winger; right midfielder

Team information
- Current team: Coventry City
- Number: 17

Youth career
- 2009–2010: FC Kronenbourg
- 2010–2011: Schiltigheim
- 2011–2014: Strasbourg
- 2014–2021: Rennes

Senior career*
Years	Team	Apps	(Gls)
2020–2023	Rennes II	14	(9)
2021–2023	Rennes	10	(0)
2022–2023	→ Dijon (loan)	28	(1)
2023–2024	Salernitana	33	(4)
2024–2025	Lazio	24	(1)
2025–2026	Burnley	29	(2)
2026–	Coventry City	4	(0)

International career^{‡}
2018–2019	France U16	9	(2)
2020	France U17	5	(3)
2021–2022	France U19	17	(7)
2022–2024	France U20	12	(4)
2024–2025	France U21	10	(1)
- * Club domestic league appearances and goals as of 22:23, 21 August 2026 (UTC) ‡ National team caps and goals as of 25 June 2025

Loum Tchaouna (born 8 September 2003) is a professional footballer who plays as a winger or right midfielder for Premier League club Coventry City. Born in Chad, Tchaouna represents France at international level.

== Club career ==
=== Early years ===
Tchaouna was born in N'Djamena, Chad, but moved to France at a young age. He played for youth teams of FC Kronenbourg, Schiltigheim, Strasbourg before joining Rennes in 2014. He progressed through the academy system at the club playing regularly for the reserve side, Rennes II, in Championnat National 3.

He signed his first professional contract in 2021 and went on to make his professional debut in Ligue 1 for Rennes on 26 September 2021 in a 1–1 draw with Bordeaux, just weeks after his 18th birthday. He featured in 14 games across all competitions in 2021–22, all as substitutes.

With regular game time limited at Rennes, the teenager went on a season-long loan to Ligue 2 side Dijon on 30 August 2022, which included an option to buy for the club. He reunited with his brother, Haroun, who played for the club's reserve side in Championnat National 3.

At Dijon, he got his first real consistent run of minutes, making 20 starts in all competitions and scoring his first goal at senior level against Nîmes in May 2023. He was unable to prevent the side from being relegated to the Championnat National at the end of 2022–23 campaign, finishing in 18th position.

=== Salernitana ===
On 31 August 2023, Tchaouna departed his boyhood club and signed for Serie A side Salernitana on a three-year contract with an option to extend. Salernitana suffered a dismal campaign during the 2023–24 season going through four different managers and only winning two league games in the whole campaign. Despite their eventual relegation to Serie B, he was one of the key players of the team having scored six goals and four assists in 35 appearances in all competitions.

=== Lazio ===
On 1 July 2024, Tchaouna joined fellow Serie A club Lazio on a permanent deal when they matched his release clause for €8.4 million, signing a five-year contract.

He scored his first goal for the club in Serie A on 31 October 2024 in a 5–1 victory over Como; he scored his first UEFA Europa League goal on 12 December 2024 in a 3–1 victory over Ajax.

Tchaouna had an underwhelming first season at the club only managing to score two goals and register one assist across 37 games in all competitions. The vast amount of those appearances were cameos off the bench with Tchaouna only starting six league games, spending most of the season as understudy to Gustav Isaksen on the right wing.

He was more instrumental in Lazio's UEFA Europa League campaign, making seven starts as they finished first in the group stage, eventually reaching the quarter-finals, where they were defeated by Norwegian side Bodø/Glimt. Lazio were suffering financially at the end of the 2024–25 season, with club president Claudio Lotito reiterating the club's desire to trim the squad by offloading players deemed surplus to requirements, with Tchaouna falling into that category.

=== Burnley ===
On 2 July 2025, Tchaouna joined newly-promoted Premier League side Burnley on a five-year deal for an undisclosed fee, reported to be in the region of £12 million. He stated that he had a "really good conversation" with manager, Scott Parker, during the 2025 UEFA European Under-21 Championship that convinced him to join the club.

=== Coventry City ===
On 11 July 2026, Tchaouna signed a five-year deal with newly-promoted Coventry City for an undisclosed fee.

== International career ==
Tchaouna has represented France at most levels from under-16 to under-21. He achieved nine caps and scored two goals for the under-16 side all in friendly internationals.

He made five caps for the under-17 side playing in 2020 UEFA European Under-17 Championship qualifiers, however he was omitted from the 2019 FIFA U-17 World Cup squad in Brazil.

He got 17 caps and 7 goals for the under-19 side and was a part of the squad that reached the 2022 UEFA European Under-19 Championship semi-finals in Slovakia, eventually losing to Israel. Tchaouna finished as Top Scorer in the competition with four goals in four caps and was also named in the Team of the Tournament. He made 12 caps and 4 goals for the under-20 side all in international friendlies. Despite this, he couldn't force himself into the squad for the 2023 FIFA U-20 World Cup in Argentina, with France being knocked-out in the Group Stage.

He made his debut for the under-21 side under Gérald Baticle, on 11 October 2024 in a 3–0 win over Cyprus in a 2025 UEFA European Under-21 Championship qualifier. He was named in the final squad for the 2025 UEFA European Under-21 Championship in Slovakia and made four caps, as the French side were beaten in the semi-finals by Germany.

== Style of play ==
Tchaouna is a pacy left-footed player who plays mostly as an inverted right winger, looking to cut inside. He is also capable of playing on the left wing and in a more central forward role.

== Personal life ==
Tchaouna is the younger brother footballer Haroun, and older brother of Franck and Franky Tchaouna.

== Career statistics ==
=== Club ===
As of match played 6 November 2026

Appearances and goals by club, season and competition
Club	Season	League			National cup (Note: Includes Coupe de France, Coppa Italia, FA Cup)		League cup (Note: Includes EFL Cup)		Europe		Total	
Club	Season	Division	Apps	Goals	Apps	Goals	Apps	Goals	Apps	Goals	Apps	Goals
Rennes	2021–22	Ligue 1	10	0	0	0	—		4 (Note: Appearances in UEFA Europa Conference League)	0	14	0
Dijon (loan)	2022–23	Ligue 2	28	1	1	1	—		—		29	2
Salernitana	2023–24	Serie A	33	4	2	2	—		—		35	6
Lazio	2024–25	Serie A	24	1	2	0	—		11 (Note: Appearances in UEFA Europa League)	1	37	2
Burnley	2025–26	Premier League	29	2	2	1	1	0	—		32	3
Coventry City	2026–27	Premier League	5	0	0	0	1	0	—		6	0
Career total			129	8	7	4	2	0	15	1	153	13

== Honours ==
Individual

- UEFA European Under-19 Championship Top Scorer: 2022
- UEFA European Under-19 Championship Team of the Tournament: 2022
