= Haroun Tchaouna =

Chadian footballer (born 2000)

Personal information
- Full name: Haroun Loum Tchaouna
- Date of birth: 14 May 2000 (age 26)
- Place of birth: N'Djamena, Chad
- Height: 1.82 m (6 ft 0 in)
- Position: Forward

Team information
- Current team: Żabbar St. Patrick
- Number: 7

Youth career
- 2015–2018: Rennes

Senior career*
Years	Team	Apps	(Gls)
2017–2018	Rennes II	0	(0)
2018–2019	Caravaggio	15	(3)
2019–2020	Rennes II	0	(0)
2020–2021	Valcalepio	0	(0)
2021–2023	Dijon II	15	(5)
2025–	Żabbar St. Patrick	7	(1)

International career^{‡}
2019–	Chad	11	(1)
- * Club domestic league appearances and goals as of 6 October 2025 ‡ National team caps and goals as of 14 November 2025

Haroun Loum Tchaouna (Arabic: هارون تشاونا; born 14 May 2000) is a Chadian professional footballer who plays as a forward for Maltese Premier League club Żabbar St. Patrick and the Chad national team.

== Club career ==
Tchaouna is a youth product of Rennes, and began his career with their reserves in 2017. He spent the 2019-20 season in Italy with Caravaggio in the Serie D, before returning to Rennes reserves the following season. He once more went to Italy in 2020 with Valcalepio. In 2021, he again returned to France with Dijon II in the Championnat National 3.

== International career ==
Tchaouna debut with the Chad national team in a 3–1 2022 FIFA World Cup qualification loss to Sudan on 5 September 2019.

== Personal life ==
Tchaouna is the older brother of the footballers Loum, Franck and Franky Tchaouna.
