= Pedro Amador (footballer) =

Portuguese footballer (born 1998)

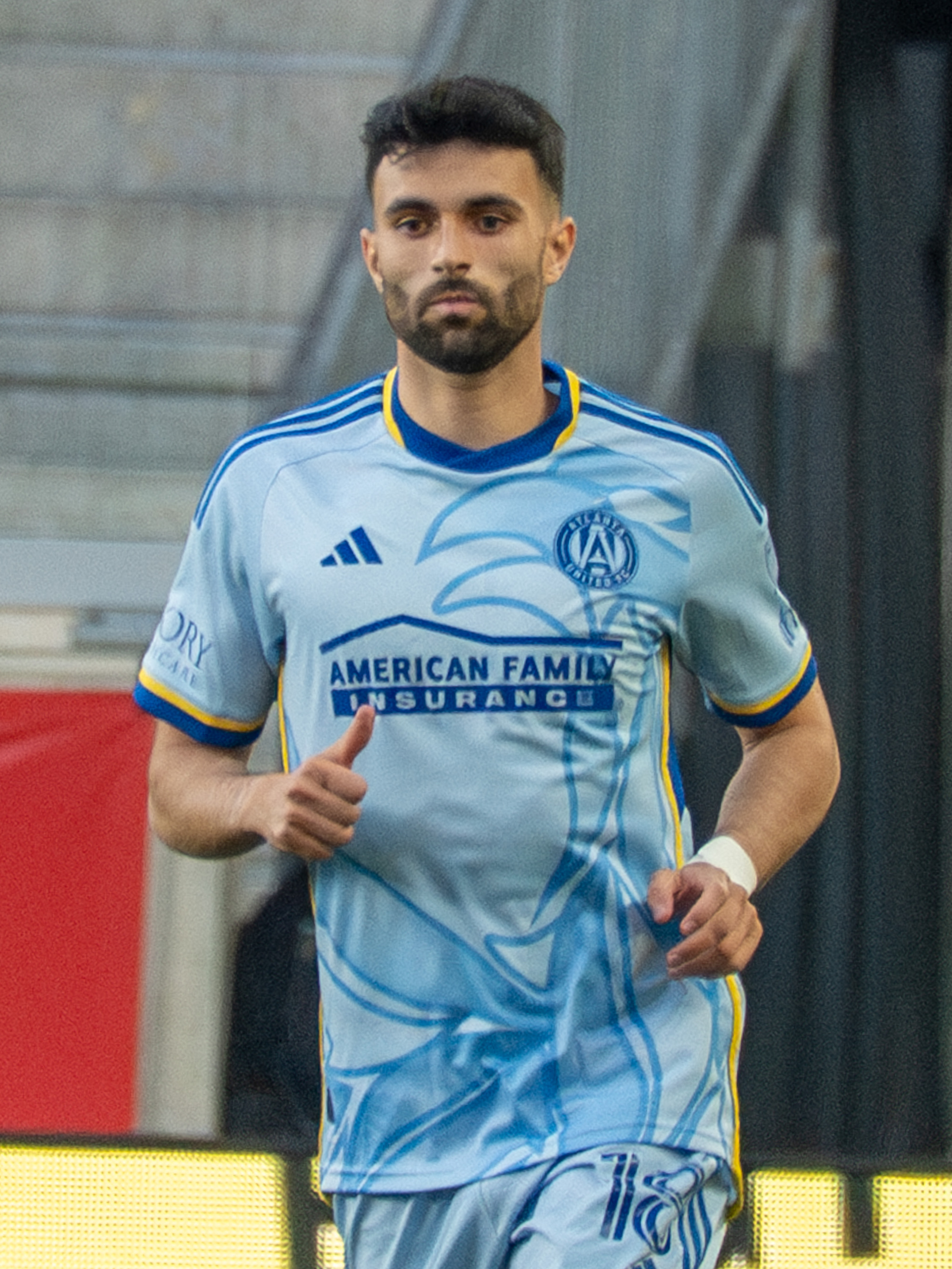
- Amador with Atlanta United in 2025

Personal information
- Full name: Pedro Miguel Santos Amador
- Date of birth: 18 December 1998 (age 27)
- Place of birth: Póvoa de Santa Iria, Portugal
- Height: 1.81 m (5 ft 11 1/2 in)
- Position: Left-back

Team information
- Current team: Hapoel Be'er Sheva
- Number: 5

Youth career
- 2007–2013: Sporting CP
- 2013–2016: Sacavenense
- 2016–2017: Belenenses

Senior career*
Years	Team	Apps	(Gls)
2017–2018	1º Dezembro	14	(0)
2018–2020	Braga B	36	(3)
2020	Braga	9	(0)
2020–2024	Moreirense	67	(0)
2024–2026	Atlanta United	47	(1)
2026–	Hapoel Be'er Sheva	9	(0)
- * Club domestic league appearances and goals as of 01:37, 19 November 2026 (UTC)

Pedro Miguel Santos Amador (Portuguese pronunciation: [ˈpedɾu miˈɣɛɫ ˈsɐ̃tuʃ ɐmɐˈðoɾ]; born 18 December 1998) is a Portuguese professional footballer who plays as a left-back for Israeli Premier League club Hapoel Be'er Sheva.

== Club career ==
=== Braga ===
Amador was born in Póvoa de Santa Iria, Loures, Lisbon District. He played youth football for three clubs, including Sporting CP from ages 8 to 14.

Amador started his senior career in the lower leagues, with 1º Dezembro. On 31 January 2018 he joined Braga, signing a three-and-a-half-year contract and being assigned to their reserves in the LigaPro.

On 31 March 2018, Amador made his professional debut with Braga B, playing the entire 1–1 away draw against Varzim and being booked. He scored his first goal in the second division on 19 January 2019, in a 3–1 home victory over Paços de Ferreira.

Amador's maiden appearance in the Primeira Liga with the first team occurred on 23 February 2020, when he came on as a first-half substitute for the injured Nuno Sequeira in an eventual 3–1 home defeat of Vitória de Setúbal. He made his first start on 6 March 2020 in another fixture at the Estádio Municipal de Braga that ended in a 3–1 win, now against Portimonense.

=== Moreirense ===
On 14 August 2020, Amador signed a four-year contract with Moreirense of the same league. He missed the vast majority of the season, due to a cruciate ligament injury to his left knee.

Amador totalled 79 games during his stint, scoring his only goal on 14 October 2022 in the 3–0 home win over Vilafranquense in the third round of the Taça de Portugal.

=== Atlanta United ===
Amador joined Atlanta United of Major League Soccer on 1 July 2024, on a two-year deal with the option of a one-year extension. He scored his only league goal on 13 September 2025, in a 4–5 home loss to the Columbus Crew; his other one was on 15 April 2026 in the 3–1 win at Chattanooga in the round of 32 of the U.S. Open Cup.

=== Hapoel Be'er Sheva ===
On 29 July 2026, Amador agreed to a four-year contract at Israeli Premier League side Hapoel Be'er Sheva.

== Honours ==
Moreirense

- Liga Portugal 2: 2022–23
