= Bryan Soumaré =

French footballer (born 1999)

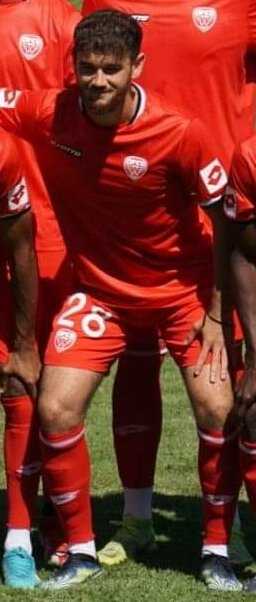

Personal information
- Date of birth: 11 February 1999 (age 27)
- Place of birth: Saint-Quentin, France
- Height: 1.80 m (5 ft 11 in)
- Position: Midfielder

Team information
- Current team: La Louvière
- Number: 28

Senior career*
Years	Team	Apps	(Gls)
2016–2019	Saint-Quentin	50	(10)
2019–2024	Dijon	79	(7)
2019–2022	Dijon B	16	(2)
2020–2021	→ Sochaux (loan)	36	(3)
2026–	La Louvière	7	(0)
- * Club domestic league appearances and goals as of 11 May 2026

Bryan Soumaré (born 11 February 1999) is a French professional footballer who plays as a midfielder for Belgian Pro League club La Louvière.
