= Enna Calcio SCSD =

Italian football club

Enna
- Full name: Enna Calcio; Società Cooperativa Sportiva Dilettantistica
- Nickname: Gialloverdi
- Founded: 1942
- Ground: Stadio Generale Gaeta; Enna, Italy
- Capacity: 2,000
- Chairman: Luigi Stompo
- Manager: Giovanni Campanella
- League: Serie D
- 2025–26: Serie D/I, 12th
Home colours	Away colours

Enna Calcio SCSD is an Italian association football club from Enna, Sicily. They currently play in Serie D.

== History ==
The club was founded in 1942, and its official colours are yellow and green. Enna plays its home matches at Stadio Generale Gaeta. The club also had a few appearances in the professional levels of Italian football, a single Serie C season in 1970–1971 and a single Serie C2 campaign in 1990–91. The club also won a trofeo Jacinto in 1990.

After being relegated to Serie D in 1991, the club went bankrupt and restarted from the lower ranks of regional amateur football, eventually playing at the Eccellenza and Promozione levels for the next few decades. In the 2022–23 season, Enna lost promotion in the final games of the season to Akragas and then were defeated by Siracusa in the national playoff finals.

In 2024, Enna were promoted to Serie D as Eccellenza Sicily winners.
