= 2021–22 Dijon FCO season =

Dijon
2021–22 season
- President: Olivier Delcourt
- Head coach: David Linarès (until 23 August); Patrice Garande (from 23 August)
- Stadium: Stade Gaston Gérard
- Ligue 2: 11th
- Coupe de France: Round of 64
- Top goalscorer: League: Aurélien Scheidler (10); All: Aurélien Scheidler (12)
Home colours	Away colours	Third colours

The 2021–22 season was the 24th season in the existence of Dijon FCO and the club's first season back in the second division of French football since 2016. In addition to the domestic league, Dijon participated in this season's edition of the Coupe de France.

== Players ==
=== First-team squad ===
Note: Flags indicate national team as defined under FIFA eligibility rules; some limited exceptions apply. Players may hold more than one non-FIFA nationality.

No.	Pos.	Nation	Player
2	DF	CIV	Adama Fofana
3	DF	FRA	Daniel Congré
5	DF	MLI	Senou Coulibaly
6	MF	BEN	Mattéo Ahlinvi
7	MF	FRA	Frédéric Sammaritano
8	FW	FRA	Mickaël Le Bihan
11	MF	FRA	Valentin Jacob
12	MF	FRA	Lucas Deaux
13	MF	TUR	Amir Arli
14	MF	FRA	Jordan Marié
16	GK	BEN	Saturnin Allagbé
18	MF	CMR	Wilitty Younoussa
19	DF	CMR	Ahmad Ngouyamsa

No.	Pos.	Nation	Player
20	DF	FRA	Christopher Rocchia
21	FW	FRA	Aurélien Scheidler
22	MF	FRA	Romain Philippoteaux (on loan from Brest)
23	DF	SEN	Zargo Touré
24	MF	FRA	Erwan Belhadji
25	DF	GAB	Bruno Ecuele Manga (captain)
26	MF	FRA	Jessy Pi
27	DF	MLI	Cheick Traoré
28	MF	FRA	Bryan Soumaré
29	MF	ROU	Alex Dobre
30	GK	FRA	Baptiste Reynet
—	GK	FRA	Thomas Roche

=== Out on loan ===
Note: Flags indicate national team as defined under FIFA eligibility rules; some limited exceptions apply. Players may hold more than one non-FIFA nationality.

No.	Pos.	Nation	Player
—	MF	ALG	Yassine Benzia (on loan to Hatayspor)
—	MF	KOS	Bersant Celina (on loan to Ipswich Town)
—	MF	GAB	Didier Ndong (on loan to Yeni Malatyaspor)

No.	Pos.	Nation	Player
—	FW	CIV	Roger Assalé (on loan to Werder Bremen)
—	FW	FRA	Mounir Chouiar (on loan to Yeni Malatyaspor)
—	FW	SEN	Moussa Konaté (on loan to Sivasspor)

== Pre-season and friendlies ==
Win Draw Loss

2 July 2021 Friendly	Dijon (France)	1–2	(France) Sochaux	Besançon, France
18:00 CEST (UTC+2)				Stadium: Stade Léo Lagrange

6 July 2021 Friendly	Dijon (France)	1–1	(France) Grenoble	Mâcon, France
18:00 CEST (UTC+2)				Stadium: Stade Pierre Guérin

9 July 2021 Friendly	Dijon (France)	1–2	(France) Nancy	Dijon, France
18:30 CEST (UTC+2)				Stadium: Stade Gaston Gérard

17 July 2021 Friendly	Dijon (France)	1–2	(France) Troyes	Dijon, France
17:00 CEST (UTC+2)				Stadium: Stade Gaston Gérard

== Competitions ==
=== Overall record ===
Competition	First match	Last match	Starting round	Final position	Record							
Competition	First match	Last match	Starting round	Final position	Pld	W	D	L	GF	GA	GD	Win %
Ligue 2	24 July 2021	14 May 2022	Matchday 1	11th	37	13	8	16	48	53	−5	35.14
Coupe de France	13 November 2021	18 December 2021	Seventh round	Round of 64	3	2	1	0	6	1	+5	66.67
Total					40	15	9	16	54	54	+0	37.50

Source: Soccerway

=== Ligue 2 ===
==== League table ====
Pos	Team	Pld	W	D	L	GF	GA	GD	Pts
9	Nîmes	38	14	7	17	44	51	−7	49
10	Pau	38	14	7	17	41	49	−8	49
11	Dijon	38	13	8	17	48	53	−5	47
12	Bastia	38	10	16	12	38	36	+2	46
13	Niort	38	12	10	16	39	42	−3	46

Source: Ligue 2
Rules for classification: 1) Points; 2) Goal difference; 3) Number of goals scored; 4) Head-to-head goal difference; 5) Fair play points

==== Results summary ====
Overall								Home						Away					
Pld	W	D	L	GF	GA	GD	Pts	W	D	L	GF	GA	GD	W	D	L	GF	GA	GD
38	13	8	17	48	53	−5	47	8	3	8	25	26	−1	5	5	9	23	27	−4

Source: Ligue 2

==== Results by round ====
Round	1	2	3	4	5	6	7	8	9	10	11	12	13	14	15	16	17	18	19	20	21	22	23	24	25	26	27	28	29	30	31	32	33	34	35	36	37	38
Ground	H	A	H	A	H	A	H	H	A	H	A	H	A	H	A	H	A	H	A	H	A	H	A	H	A	A	H	A	H	A	H	A	H	A	H	A	H	A
Result	L	L	D	L	L	L	W	W	W	L	L	W	W	L	L	W	L	D	W	L	W	W	L	L	D	L	W	D	W	D	W	D	L	L	D	W	L	D
Position	18	17	17	18	19	19	18	15	14	17	17	16	13	14	16	12	15	16	13	14	11	9	11	13	12	13	12	13	9	12	9	8	11	12	13	10	11	11

Source: Ligue 2
A = Away; H = Home; W = Win; D = Draw; L = Loss

==== Matches ====
The league fixtures were announced on 25 June 2021.

26 July 2021 1	Dijon	1–3	Sochaux	Dijon
20:45 CEST (UTC+2)	Benzia (yellow card) 18'; Rocchia (yellow card) 34'; Assalé 84'	Report	Mauricio (yellow card) 8'; Weissbeck 51'; Kalulu 74'; Pogba (yellow card) 90+3'; Virginius 90+7'	Stadium: Stade Gaston Gérard; Referee: Aurelien Petit

31 July 2021 2	Nîmes	2–1	Dijon	Nîmes
19:00 CET (UTC+1)	Benrahou 28' (pen.); Cubas (yellow card) 37'; Martinez (yellow card) 45+1'; Fomba 80'	Report	Traoré (red card) 26'; Ngouyamsa (yellow card) 35'; Coulibaly (yellow card) 45+1'; Assalé 79'	Stadium: Stade des Costières; Referee: Benjamin Lepaysant

7 August 2021 3	Dijon	1–1	Rodez	Dijon
19:00 CEST (UTC+2)	Jacob (yellow card) 40'; Scheidler 56'; Coulibaly (yellow card) 86'; Dobre (yellow card) 90+2'	Report	Dépres (yellow card) 77'; Ouammou 90+4'	Stadium: Stade Gaston Gérard; Referee: Ruddy Buquet

14 August 2021 4	Quevilly-Rouen	2–1	Dijon	Rouen
19:00 CEST (UTC+2)	Haddad 26'; Sangaré (yellow card) 43'; Gbellé 79'	Report	Deaux (yellow card) 48'; Scheidler 74', (yellow card) 90+3'; Traoré (yellow card) 79'	Stadium: Stade Robert Diochon; Referee: Gaël Angoula

21 August 2021 5	Dijon	2–4	Toulouse	Dijon
15:00 CEST (UTC+2)	Scheidler 31'; Younoussa (yellow card) 45+3'; Le Bihan 81' (pen.); Congré (yellow card) 86'; Traoré (yellow card) 87'	Report	Evitt-Healey (yellow card) 28'; Onaiwu 37'; Ngoumou 51', 62'; Gabrielsen (yellow card) 54'; Spierings (yellow card) 57' van den Boomen 87' (pen.)	Stadium: Stade Gaston Gérard; Referee: Nicolas Rainville

28 August 2021 6	Pau	2–0	Dijon	Pau
19:00 CEST (UTC+2)	Nišić (yellow card) 16'; Assifuah 45'; Essende 82'	Report	Ahlinvi (yellow card) 44'	Stadium: Nouste Camp; Referee: Abdelatif Kherradji

11 September 2021 7	Dijon	2–1	Bastia	Dijon
19:00 CEST (UTC+2)	Deaux (yellow card) 33'; Congré (yellow card) 48'; Benzia 58', 87'; Traoré (yellow card) 83'	Report	Vincent (yellow card) 33'; Le Cardinal (yellow card) 39'; Schur (yellow card) 62'; Santelli 70'	Stadium: Stade Gaston Gérard; Referee: Bartolomeu Varela

18 September 2021 8	Dijon	2–0	Dunkerque	Dijon
19:00 CEST (UTC+2)	Traoré (yellow card) 38'; Rocchia (yellow card) 44'; Le Bihan 55'; Coulibaly 86'	Report	Ba (yellow card) 45'; Brahimi (yellow card) 69'; Gomis (yellow card) 84'	Stadium: Stade Gaston Gérard; Referee: Aurelien Petit

21 September 2021 9	Caen	0–1	Dijon	Caen
20:00 CEST (UTC+2)	Abdi (yellow card) 64' (yellow-red card) 75'	Report	Younoussa (yellow card) 21'; Ecuele Manga (yellow card) 23'; Scheidler 29'; Pi (yellow card) 84'	Stadium: Stade Michel d'Ornano; Attendance: 8,391; Referee: Gaël Angoula

24 September 2021 10	Dijon	0–1	Valenciennes	Dijon
19:00 CEST (UTC+2)	Benzia (yellow card) 85'; Scheidler (yellow card) 85'	Report	Ayité (yellow card) 43'; Picouleau 45'; Hamache (yellow card) 57'; Ouattara (yellow card) 73'; Haouari (yellow card) 90'	Stadium: Stade Gaston Gérard; Referee: Frank Schneider

2 October 2021 11	Le Havre	2–0	Dijon	Le Havre
20:45 CEST (UTC+2)	Cornette 20'; Lekhal 62' (pen.); Mayembo (yellow card) 84'; Richardson (yellow card) 87'	Report		Stadium: Stade Océane; Referee: Marc Bollengier

16 October 2021 12	Dijon	1–0	Amiens	Dijon
19:00 CEST (UTC+2)	Ngouyamsa (red card) 45+1'; Dobre 59'; Younoussa (yellow card) 80'	Report		Stadium: Stade Gaston Gérard; Referee: Jérôme Miguelgorry

23 October 2021 13	Grenoble	1–2	Dijon	Grenoble
19:00 CEST (UTC+2)	Ravet 29'; Cissé (yellow card) 30'; Bambock (yellow card) 35'	Report	Coulibaly (yellow card) 28'; Benzia 57'; Dobre 76'; Pi (yellow card) 87'	Stadium: Stade des Alpes; Referee: Gaël Angoula

30 October 2021 14	Dijon	0–1	Paris FC	Dijon
19:00 CEST (UTC+2)	Le Bihan (yellow card) 5'	Report	Deaux 34' (o.g.); Camara (yellow card) 42'; Kanté (yellow card) 66'; Caddy (yellow card) 76'	Stadium: Stade Gaston Gérard; Referee: Frank Schneider

6 November 2021 15	Ajaccio	1–0	Dijon	Ajaccio
19:00 CEST (UTC+2)	Cimignani (yellow card) 8'; Bayala (yellow card) 40'; Avinel (yellow card) 74'; Marchetti (yellow card) 89'; Nouri (yellow card) 90+1'; El Idrissy 90+4'	Report	Le Bihan (yellow card) 17'; Scheidler (yellow card) 61'; Coulibaly (yellow card) 89'	Stadium: Stade François Coty; Referee: Bartolomeu Varela

22 November 2021 16	Dijon	3–1	Auxerre	Dijon
20:45 CET (UTC+1)	Jacob 16'; Scheidler 38'; Benzia 79'; Coulibaly (yellow card) 87'	Report	Jubal Jr. (yellow card) 41'; Touré (yellow card) 60'; Charbonnier 61'; Pellenard (yellow card) 87'	Stadium: Stade Gaston Gérard; Referee: Nicolas Rainville

3 December 2021 17	Guingamp	3–2	Dijon	Guingamp
19:00 CET (UTC+1)	Ba (yellow card) 43'; Pierrot 52', (yellow card) 55'; Gomis 72'; Roux 78'; Diarra (yellow card) 82'	Report	Ngouyamsa (yellow card) 20'; Younoussa (yellow card) 32'; Scheidler 38', 47'; Benzia (yellow card) 53'; Traoré (yellow card) 67'; Deaux (yellow card) 73'	Stadium: Stade de Roudourou; Referee: Aurelien Petit

11 December 2021 18	Dijon	2–2	Niort	Dijon
19:00 CET (UTC+1)	Coulibaly (yellow card) 33'; Scheidler (yellow card) 49'; Rocchia (yellow card) 58'; Congré 69'; Le Bihan 84'; Deaux (yellow card) 86'	Report	Reynet 23' (o.g.); Merdji 28'; Yongwa (yellow card) 67'; Louiserre (yellow card) 80'; Benchamma (yellow card) 83'	Stadium: Stade Gaston Gérard; Referee: Abdelatif Kherradji

21 December 2021 19	Nancy	0–3	Dijon	Tomblaine
20:45 CEST (UTC+2)	Haag (yellow card) 47'	Report	Traoré (yellow card) 2'; Dobre 23'; Congré (yellow card) 51'; Jacob 78'; Philippoteaux 80'	Stadium: Stade Marcel Picot; Referee: Marc Bollengier

8 January 2022 20	Dijon	1–2	Nîmes	Dijon
19:00 CET (UTC+1)	Jacob (yellow card) 54'; Philippoteaux 57'; Ahlinvi (yellow card) 60'; Ngouyamsa (yellow card) 64'	Report	Eliasson 5'; Sainte-Luce (yellow card) 17' (yellow-red card) 45'; Ponceau 30'; Bråtveit (yellow card) 85'	Stadium: Stade Gaston Gérard; Referee: Mathieu Vernice

15 January 2022 21	Rodez	0–2	Dijon	Rodez
19:00 CET (UTC+1)	Bardy (yellow card) 37' (yellow-red card) 88'; Malanda (yellow card) 43'; Célestine (yellow card) 59'	Report	Ngouyamsa (yellow card) 20'; Congré 27'; Dobre 55'	Stadium: Stade Paul-Lignon; Referee: Nocolas Rainville

22 January 2022 22	Dijon	1–0	Quevilly-Rouen	Dijon
19:00 CET (UTC+1)	Scheidler (yellow card) 8', (goal) 49'; Younoussa (yellow card) 17'	Report	Dekoke (yellow card) 60'	Stadium: Stade Gaston Gérard; Referee: Bartolomeu Varela

5 February 2022 23	Toulouse	4–1	Dijon	Toulouse
15:00 CET (UTC+1)	Ngoumou 24'; Nicolaisen 44'; Diakité (yellow card) 57'; Ratão 65'; Onaiwu 81'	Report	Scheidler 33'; Coulibaly (yellow card) 50'; Fofana (yellow card) 84'	Stadium: Stadium de Toulouse; Referee: Marc Bollengier

12 February 2022 24	Dijon	0–1	Pau	Dijon
19:00 CET (UTC+1)	Pi (yellow card) 18'; Le Bihan (yellow card) 90+3'	Report	Essende (yellow card) 22'; Boto (yellow card) 30'; Batisse (yellow card) 36'; Koffi 58'; Poha (yellow card) 69'	Stadium: Stade Gaston Gérard; Referee: Gaël Angoula

19 February 2022 25	Bastia	0–0	Dijon	Furiani
19:00 CET (UTC+1)	Guidi (yellow card) 21'; Ben Saada (yellow card) 85'	Report		Stadium: Stade Armand Cesari; Referee: Remi Landry

26 February 2022 26	Dunkerque	2–1	Dijon	Dunkirk
19:00 CET (UTC+1)	Niané 31'; Kikonda (yellow card) 53'; I. Gomis 64'	Report	Philippoteaux (yellow card) 19'; Dobre 51'; Le Bihan (yellow card) 80'	Stadium: Stade Marcel-Tribut; Referee: Abdelatif Kherradji

5 March 2022 27	Dijon	1–0	Caen	Dijon
19:00 CET (UTC+1)	Le Bihan 37'; Deaux (yellow card) 61'	Report	Vandermersch (yellow card) 64'	Stadium: Stade Gaston Gérard; Referee: Frank Schneider

12 March 2022 28	Valenciennes	0–0	Dijon	Valenciennes
19:00 CET (UTC+1)	Lecoeuche (yellow card) 14'; Ntim (yellow card) 22'; Masson (yellow card) 30'; Linguet (yellow card) 39'; Cuffaut (yellow card) 82'	Report	Traoré (yellow card) 12'; Pi (yellow card) 42'; Coulibaly (red card) 61'	Stadium: Stade du Hainaut; Referee: Mathieu Vernice

15 March 2022 29	Dijon	2–0	Le Havre	Dijon
20:00 CET (UTC+1)	Thiaré 51' (o.g.); Traoré 90'	Report	Wahib (yellow card) 29'; Lekhal (red card) 85'	Stadium: Stade Gaston Gérard; Referee: Aurelien Petit

19 March 2022 30	Amiens	1–1	Dijon	Amiens
19:00 CET (UTC+1)	Bénet (yellow card) 64'; Bamba 71'	Report	Traoré (yellow card) 57'; Dossevi 90+2' (o.g.)	Stadium: Stade de la Licorne; Referee: Guillaume Paradis

2 April 2022 31	Dijon	1–0	Grenoble	Dijon
19:00 CEST (UTC+2)	Le Bihan 85'	Report	Correa (yellow card) 58'; Abdallah (red card) 69'; Sanyang (yellow card) 78'	Stadium: Stade Gaston Gérard; Referee: Nicolas Rainville

11 April 2022 32	Paris FC	2–2	Dijon	Paris
20:45 CEST (UTC+2)	López 56', (yellow card) 63', (goal) 64'; Bamba (yellow card) 76'; Boutaïb (yellow card) 90+3'	Report	Scheidler 27'; Philippoteaux 71'; Coulibaly (yellow card) 75'	Stadium: Stade Sébastien Charléty; Referee: Olivier Thual

16 April 2022 33	Dijon	0–3	Ajaccio	Dijon
19:00 CEST (UTC+2)		Report	Courtet 21'; Bayala 53'; Arconte (yellow card) 60', (goal) 87'; Leroy (yellow card) 85'	Stadium: Stade Gaston Gérard; Referee: Abdelatif Kherradji

19 April 2022 34	Auxerre	2–1	Dijon	Auxerre
20:00 CEST (UTC+2)	Hein 3'; Coeff 24'; Arcus (yellow card) 82'	Report	Younoussa (yellow card) 31'; Philippoteaux (yellow card) 59'; Scheidler 69'	Stadium: Stade de l'Abbé-Deschamps; Referee: Marc Bollengier

22 April 2022 35	Dijon	3–3	Guingamp	Dijon
19:00 CEST (UTC+2)	Scheidler 1'; Dobre 27', 45+2'; Pi (yellow card) 59'	Report	Sivis 54'; Diarra (yellow card) 63'; M'Changama 80' (pen.); Muyumba 90+1'	Stadium: Stade Gaston Gérard; Referee: Eric Wattellier

30 April 2022 36	Niort	1–3	Dijon	Niort
20:00 CEST (UTC+2)	Mendes 45+2' (pen.)	Report	Dobre 44', 50'; Le Bihan 77'; Jacob (yellow card) 83'	Stadium: Stade René Gaillard; Referee: Pierre Legat

7 May 2022 37	Dijon	2–3	Nancy	Dijon
19:00 CEST (UTC+2)	Coulibaly 5'; Ecuele Manga 78'	Report	N'Gbakoto 53', 76'; Bobichon 62'	Stadium: Stade Gaston Gérard; Referee: Olivier Thual

14 May 2022 38	Sochaux	2–2	Dijon	Montbéliard
19:00 CEST (UTC+2)	Weissbeck 2', 51'	Report	Le Bihan 58'; Philippoteaux 78'; Traoré (yellow card) 87'	Stadium: Stade Auguste Bonal; Referee: Frank Schneider

=== Coupe de France ===
13 November 2021 Seventh round	ASC Saint-Apollinaire	0–3	Dijon	Dijon
14:00 CET (UTC+1)		Report	Jacob 41'; Scheidler 65', 85'	Stadium: Stade Gaston Gérard; Referee: Antoine Valet

27 November 2021 Eighth round	FC Morteau-Montlebon	0–2	Dijon	Montlebon
14:30 CET (UTC+1)		Report	Ecuele Manga 68'; Arlı 90+1'	Stadium: Stade Henri Schaller; Referee: Ali Djedid

18 December 2021 Round of 64	AS Cannes	1–1 (3–2 p)	Dijon	Cannes
18:30 CET (UTC+1)	Gonçalves 74'	Report	Le Bihan 48'	Stadium: Stade Pierre de Coubertin; Referee: Arnaud Baert
