= 2020–21 Dijon FCO season =

Dijon FCO
2020–21 season
- President: Olivier Delcourt
- Head coach: Stéphane Jobard (until 5 November); David Linarès (from 5 November)
- Stadium: Stade Gaston Gérard
- Ligue 1: 20th (relegated)
- Coupe de France: Round of 64
- Top goalscorer: League: Mama Baldé (7); All: Mama Baldé (7)
- Biggest win: Nice 1–3 Dijon; Nîmes 1–3 Dijon; Dijon 2–0 Nice
- Biggest defeat: Paris Saint-Germain 4–0 Dijon; Dijon 0–4 Paris Saint-Germain; Rennes 5–1 Dijon; Dijon 1–5 Metz
Home colours	Away colours	Third colours
- All statistics correct as of 23 May 2021.

The 2020–21 season was the 23rd season in the existence of Dijon FCO and the club's fifth consecutive season in the top flight of French football. In addition to the domestic league, Dijon participated in this season's edition of the Coupe de France. The season covered the period from 1 July 2020 to 30 June 2021.

The head coach Stéphane Jobard was relieved of his duties nine games to the season. He was replaced by David Linarès.

== Players ==
=== First-team squad ===
As of 1 February 2021

Note: Flags indicate national team as defined under FIFA eligibility rules; some limited exceptions apply. Players may hold more than one non-FIFA nationality.

No.	Pos.	Nation	Player
1	GK	SUI	Anthony Racioppi
2	DF	FRA	Sacha Boey
3	DF	COD	Ngonda Muzinga
4	DF	ENG	Jonathan Panzo
5	DF	FRA	Senou Coulibaly
6	MF	SEN	Pape Cheikh Diop (on loan from Lyon)
7	MF	FRA	Frédéric Sammaritano
8	MF	FRA	Éric Ebimbe (on loan from PSG)
9	MF	KOS	Bersant Celina
10	MF	ALG	Yassine Benzia
11	FW	SEN	Moussa Konaté
12	DF	FRA	Arthur Zagre (on loan from Monaco)
13	DF	ECU	Aníbal Chalá
14	MF	FRA	Jordan Marié

No.	Pos.	Nation	Player
15	FW	CIV	Roger Assalé
16	GK	BEN	Saturnin Allagbé
17	MF	GBS	Mama Baldé
18	MF	CMR	Wilitty Younoussa
19	DF	CMR	Ahmad Ngouyamsa
21	FW	FRA	Mounir Chouiar
22	MF	GAB	Didier Ndong
24	DF	NCL	Wesley Lautoa
25	DF	GAB	Bruno Ecuele Manga (captain)
26	DF	MAR	Fouad Chafik
27	FW	MTN	Aboubakar Kamara (on loan from Fulham)
29	MF	ROU	Alex Dobre
30	GK	FRA	Lévi Ntumba

=== Out on loan ===
Note: Flags indicate national team as defined under FIFA eligibility rules; some limited exceptions apply. Players may hold more than one non-FIFA nationality.

No.	Pos.	Nation	Player
—	DF	FRA	Théo Barbet (on loan to Bastia-Borgo until the end of 2020/21 season)
—	MF	FRA	Bryan Soumaré (on loan to Sochaux-Montbéliard until the end of 2020/21 season)

No.	Pos.	Nation	Player
—	FW	FRA	Rayan Philippe (on loan to AS Nancy until the end of 2020/21 season)
—	FW	FRA	Aurélien Scheidler (on loan to AS Nancy until the end of 2020/21 season)

== Transfers ==
=== In ===
No.	Pos	Player	Transferred from	Fee	Date	Source
6	MF	(Senegal) Pape Cheikh Diop	Lyon	Loan	5 August 2020	
4	DF	(England) Jonathan Panzo	Monaco	Undisclosed	26 August 2020	
1	GK	(Switzerland) Anthony Racioppi	Lyon	Free	25 September 2020	
2	DF	(France) Sacha Boey	Rennes	Loan	5 October 2020	

=== Out ===
No.	Pos	Player	Transferred to	Fee	Date	Source
27	DF	(Morocco) Hamza Mendyl	(Germany) Schalke 04	Loan return	1 July 2020	
4	DF	(Morocco) Nayef Aguerd	(France) Rennais	€4,000,000	14 August 2020	
12	MF	(Spain) Enzo Loiodice	(Spain) Las Palmas	Free	18 August 2020	
11	FW	(Cape Verde) Júlio Tavares	(Saudi Arabia) Al Faisaly	€1,000,000	13 September 2020	
1	GK	(Iceland) Rúnar Alex Rúnarsson	(England) Arsenal	€2,000,000	21 September 2020	
16	GK	(Senegal) Alfred Gomis	(France) Rennais	€10,000,000	29 September 2020	

== Pre-season and friendlies ==
Win Draw Loss

18 July 2020 Friendly	Paris FC (France)	0–2	(France) Dijon	Migennes, France
18:00 CEST (UTC+2)			Scheidler 19'; Tavares 69'	Stadium: Stade Lucien Masson

1 August 2020 Friendly	Sochaux (France)	0–0	(France) Dijon	Besançon, France
16:00 CEST (UTC+2)		Report		Stadium: Stade Léo Lagrange; Attendance: 1,500; Referee: Antoine Valnet

4 August 2020 Friendly	Dijon (France)	Cancelled	(France) Strasbourg	Dijon, France
18:00 CEST (UTC+2)				Stadium: Stade Gaston Gérard

7 August 2020 Friendly	Dijon (France)	1–2	(France) Metz	Dijon, France
10:30 CEST (UTC+2)	Scheidler 105'	Report	Nguette 15'; Yade 78'	Stadium: Stade Gaston Gérard
Note: Match was played in three 45-minute parts.

15 August 2020 Friendly	Dijon (France)	Cancelled	(France) Nîmes	Dijon, France
14:00 CEST (UTC+2)		Report		Stadium: Stade Gaston Gérard

15 August 2020 Friendly	Lens (France)	1–0	(France) Dijon	Lens, France
19:00 CEST (UTC+2)	Gradit (yellow card) 20'; Sotoca 25'; Banza (yellow card) 80'	Report	Muzinga (yellow card) 38'; Manga (yellow card) 55'; Diop (yellow card) 90'	Stadium: Stade Bollaert-Delelis

== Competitions ==
=== Overall record ===
Competition	First match	Last match	Starting round	Final position	Record							
Competition	First match	Last match	Starting round	Final position	Pld	W	D	L	GF	GA	GD	Win %
Ligue 1	22 August 2020	23 May 2021	Matchday 1	20th	38	4	9	25	25	73	−48	10.53
Coupe de France	10 February 2021		Round of 64	Round of 64	1	0	0	1	0	1	−1	0.00
Total					39	4	9	26	25	74	−49	10.26

Source: Soccerway

=== Ligue 1 ===
==== League table ====
Pos	Team	Pld	W	D	L	GF	GA	GD	Pts	Qualification or relegation
16	Lorient	38	11	9	18	50	68	−18	42	
17	Brest	38	11	8	19	50	66	−16	41	
18	Nantes (O)	38	9	13	16	47	55	−8	40	Qualification for the Relegation play-offs
19	Nîmes (R)	38	9	8	21	40	71	−31	35	Relegation to the Ligue 2
20	Dijon (R)	38	4	9	25	25	73	−48	21	Relegation to the Ligue 2

Source: Ligue 1
Rules for classification: 1) Points; 2) Goal difference; 3) Goals scored; 4) Head-to-head goal difference; 5) Fairplay ranking.
(O) Play-off winners; (R) Relegated

==== Results summary ====
Overall								Home						Away					
Pld	W	D	L	GF	GA	GD	Pts	W	D	L	GF	GA	GD	W	D	L	GF	GA	GD
38	4	9	25	25	73	−48	21	1	6	12	8	31	−23	3	3	13	17	42	−25

Source: Ligue 1

==== Results by round ====
Round	1	2	3	4	5	6	7	8	9	10	11	12	13	14	15	16	17	18	19	20	21	22	23	24	25	26	27	28	29	30	31	32	33	34	35	36	37	38
Ground	H	A	H	A	H	A	H	A	H	A	H	A	H	A	H	H	A	A	H	A	H	A	H	A	H	A	H	A	H	H	A	A	H	A	H	A	H	A
Result	L	L	L	L	D	L	D	L	D	D	L	W	D	D	L	L	W	D	D	L	D	L	L	L	L	L	L	L	L	L	L	L	W	L	L	L	L	W
Position	18	19	19	20	20	20	20	20	20	20	20	20	20	20	20	20	19	18	18	19	18	19	19	19	20	20	20	20	20	20	20	20	20	20	20	20	20	20

Source: Ligue 1
A = Away; H = Home; W = Win; D = Draw; L = Loss

==== Matches ====
The league fixtures were announced on 9 July 2020.

22 August 2020 1	Dijon	0–1	Angers	Dijon
17:00 CEST (UTC+2)		Report	Traoré 22'	Stadium: Stade Gaston Gérard; Referee: Eric Wattellier

28 August 2020 2	Lyon	4–1	Dijon	Décines-Charpieu
21:00 CEST (UTC+2)	Depay 39' (pen.), 45+1', 65' (pen.), (yellow card) 68'; Lautoa 45' (o.g.); Dembélé (yellow card) 80'; Marcelo (yellow card) 90+2'	Report	Scheidler 14'; Ngouyamsa (yellow card) 38'; Ndong (yellow card) 45+1'; Sammaritano (yellow card) 65'	Stadium: Parc Olympique Lyonnais; Referee: Benoît Millot

13 September 2020 3	Dijon	0–2	Brest	Dijon
15:00 CEST (UTC+2)	Diop (yellow card) 20'; Assalé (red card) 55'; Ndong (yellow card) 56'	Report	Perraud 42'; Cardona 90+5'	Stadium: Stade Gaston Gérard; Referee: Bastien Dechepy

20 September 2020 4	Strasbourg	1–0	Dijon	Strasbourg
15:00 CEST (UTC+2)	Ajorque (yellow card) 13'; Mitrović 80'	Report	Sammaritano (yellow card) 33'	Stadium: Stade de la Meinau; Referee: Florent Batta

27 September 2020 5	Dijon	2–2	Montpellier	Dijon
15:00 CEST (UTC+2)	Dina-Ebimbe 8', (yellow card) 28'; Chafik (yellow card) 9'; Celina (yellow card) 19'; Manga 60'; Panzo (yellow card) 88'	Report	Delort 50'; Mavididi (yellow card) 77'; Savanier 90' (pen.)	Stadium: Stade Gaston Gérard; Referee: Aurélien Petit

4 October 2020 6	Bordeaux	3–0	Dijon	Bordeaux
15:00 CEST (UTC+2)	Oudin 12'; Kalu 29', (yellow card) 74'; Pablo (yellow card) 71'; Bašić 89'	Report	Dina-Ebimbe (yellow card) 38'; Panzo (yellow card) 61'; Chouiar (yellow card) 76'	Stadium: Matmut Atlantique; Referee: Antony Gautier

16 October 2020 7	Dijon	1–1	Rennes	Dijon
19:00 CEST (UTC+2)	Ndong (yellow card) 5'; Baldé 53'; Chafik (yellow card) 58'; Allagbé (yellow card) 70'; Diop (yellow card) 82'	Report	Terrier 24'; Dalbert (yellow card) 86'; Rugani (yellow card) 88'	Stadium: Stade Gaston Gérard; Referee: Bastien Dechepy

24 October 2020 8	Paris Saint-Germain	4–0	Dijon	Paris
21:00 CEST (UTC+2)	Kean 3', 23'; Mbappé 82', 88'	Report	Konaté (yellow card) 45+1'; Panzo (yellow card) 69'	Stadium: Parc des Princes; Referee: Johan Hamel

1 November 2020 9	Dijon	0–0	Lorient	Dijon
15:00 CET (UTC+1)	Boey (yellow card) 41'; Allagbé (yellow card) 54'	Report	Wissa (penalty missed) 57'; Lemoine (yellow card) 79'	Stadium: Stade Gaston Gérard; Attendance: 0 Referee: Aurélien Petit

8 November 2020 10	Metz	1–1	Dijon	Metz
15:00 CET (UTC+1)	Nguette (penalty missed) 7'; Yade 21'; Vagner (yellow card) 64'; Delaine (yellow card) 90+1'	Report	Baldé 13'; Chouiar (penalty missed) 30', (yellow card) 90'	Stadium: Stade Saint-Symphorien; Attendance: 0 Referee: Willy Delajod

22 November 2020 11	Dijon	0–1	Lens	Dijon
15:00 CET (UTC+1)	Chafik (yellow card) 54'; Marié (yellow card) 56'	Report	Kalimuendo 23'	Stadium: Stade Gaston Gérard; Attendance: 0 Referee: Eric Wattellier

29 November 2020 12	Nice	1–3	Dijon	Nice
17:00 CET (UTC+1)	Danilo (yellow card) 24'; Gouiri (yellow card) 34', (goal) 80' (pen.); Boudaoui (yellow card) 57'	Report	Baldé 21', 66'; Muzinga 31', (yellow card) 69'; Diop (yellow card) 83'; Konaté (yellow card) 90+4'	Stadium: Allianz Riviera; Attendance: 0 Referee: François Letexier

6 December 2020 13	Dijon	0–0	Saint-Étienne	Dijon
15:00 CET (UTC+1)		Report	Moukoudi (yellow card) 22'	Stadium: Stade Gaston Gérard; Attendance: 0 Referee: Ruddy Buquet

13 December 2020 14	Nantes	1–1	Dijon	Nantes
15:00 CET (UTC+1)	Simon 24' (pen.); Chirivella (yellow card) 31'; Blas (yellow card) 33'	Report	Panzo (yellow card) 22'; Konaté 54'; Scheidler (yellow card) 90+2'	Stadium: Stade de la Beaujoire; Attendance: 0 Referee: Antony Gautier

16 December 2020 15	Dijon	0–2	Lille	Dijon
19:00 CET (UTC+1)		Report	Yazıcı 19'; Weah 90+3'	Stadium: Stade Gaston Gérard; Attendance: 0 Referee: Hakim Ben El Hadj

20 December 2020 16	Dijon	0–1	Monaco	Dijon
15:00 CET (UTC+1)	Chouiar (yellow card) 5'; Ndong (yellow card) 37'	Report	Volland 15'; Tchouaméni (yellow card) 26'	Stadium: Stade Gaston Gérard; Attendance: 0 Referee: Jérémy Stinat

23 December 2020 17	Nîmes	1–3	Dijon	Nîmes
19:00 CET (UTC+1)	Ahlinvi 31'; Alakouch (yellow card) 43'; Ferhat (yellow card) 43'; Miguel (red card) 76'	Report	Baldé (yellow card) 14', (goal) 77'; Konaté 75', 90+3'; Celina (yellow card) 90+2'	Stadium: Stade des Costières; Attendance: 0 Referee: Jérémie Pignard

6 January 2021 18	Reims	0–0	Dijon	Reims
21:00 CET (UTC+1)	Foket (yellow card) 59'; Chavalerin (yellow card) 74'	Report	Diop (yellow card) 25'; Celina (yellow card) 42'; Sammaritano (yellow card) 79'	Stadium: Stade Auguste-Delaune; Attendance: 0 Referee: Amaury Delerue

9 January 2021 19	Dijon	0–0	Marseille	Dijon
21:00 CET (UTC+1)	Diop (yellow card) 19'; Manga (yellow card) 23'; Lautoa (yellow card) 66'	Report	Gueye (yellow card) 29'; Rongier (yellow card) 63'	Stadium: Stade Gaston Gérard; Attendance: 0 Referee: Jérôme Miguelgorry

24 January 2021 21	Dijon	1–1	Strasbourg	Dijon
15:00 CET (UTC+1)	Muzinga (yellow card) 54'; Coulibaly 63'	Report	Ajorque 51'	Stadium: Stade Gaston Gérard; Attendance: 0 Referee: Jérôme Brisard

27 January 2021 20	Lorient	3–2	Dijon	Lorient
21:00 CET (UTC+1)	Chalobah 30', (yellow card) 90+2'; Moffi 58'; Etienne (yellow card) 65'; Racioppi 90+5' (o.g.)	Report	Baldé (yellow card) 10', (goal) 42'; Konaté (yellow card) 26'; Ecuele Manga 40'; Ndong (yellow card) 73'	Stadium: Stade du Moustoir; Attendance: 0 Referee: Bastien Dechepy
Note: The match originally scheduled for 17 January 2021, but postponed after more than ten Lorient players tested positive for COVID-19.

31 January 2021 22	Lille	1–0	Dijon	Villeneuve-d'Ascq
17:00 CET (UTC+1)	Botman (yellow card) 13'; Yazıcı 29'; Xeka (yellow card) 82'	Report	Muzinga (yellow card) 75'; Chafik (yellow card) 90+3'	Stadium: Stade Pierre-Mauroy; Attendance: 0 Referee: Jérémie Pignard

3 February 2021 23	Dijon	0–1	Lyon	Dijon
21:00 CET (UTC+1)	Chouiar (yellow card) 61'; Coulibaly (yellow card) 74'	Report	Paquetá 21'	Stadium: Stade Gaston Gérard; Attendance: 0 Referee: Johan Hamel

7 February 2021 24	Montpellier	4–2	Dijon	Montpellier
15:00 CET (UTC+1)	Delort (yellow card) 31'; Mollet (yellow card) 39'; Laborde 48', 56'; Savanier 61'; Le Tallec (yellow card) 86'; Škuletić 90+1'	Report	Coulibaly 5', (yellow card) 44' (yellow-red card) 69'; Baldé (yellow card) 27'; Konaté 88' (pen.)	Stadium: Stade de la Mosson; Attendance: 0 Referee: Frank Schneider

14 February 2021 25	Dijon	0–2	Nîmes	Dijon
15:00 CET (UTC+1)	Chouiar (yellow card) 49'; Lautoa (yellow card) 61'; Sammaritano (yellow card) 79', (red card) 90'; Ndong (yellow card) 90+4'	Report	Ferhat (yellow card) 42'; Ripart 76'; Eliasson 87'	Stadium: Stade Gaston Gérard; Attendance: 0 Referee: Aurélien Petit

21 February 2021 26	Lens	2–1	Dijon	Lens
15:00 CET (UTC+1)	Fofana 30'; Banza 64'; Badé (yellow card) 79'; Doucouré (yellow card) 86'; Haïdara (yellow card) 88'	Report	Muzinga 61'; Kamara (red card) 74'	Stadium: Stade Bollaert-Delelis; Attendance: 0 Referee: Benoît Bastien

27 February 2021 27	Dijon	0–4	Paris Saint-Germain	Dijon
17:00 CET (UTC+1)	Dina Ebimbe (yellow card) 25'; Celina (yellow card) 31'	Report	Kean 6', (yellow card) 34'; Mbappé 32' (pen.), 51'; Pereira 82'	Stadium: Stade Gaston Gérard; Attendance: 0 Referee: Mikael Lesage

3 March 2021 28	Brest	3–1	Dijon	Brest
19:00 CET (UTC+1)	Honorat 17'; Brassier (yellow card) 22'; Mounié 27'; Perraud (yellow card) 28'; Cardona 40'; Charbonnier (yellow card) 61'	Report	Assalé 29'; Dina Ebimbe (yellow card) 84'	Stadium: Stade Francis-Le Blé; Attendance: 0 Referee: Jérémy Stinat

14 March 2021 29	Dijon	1–3	Bordeaux	Dijon
15:00 CET (UTC+1)	Kamara (yellow card) 30'; Muzinga (yellow card) 73'; Coulibaly (yellow card) 86'; Konaté 90'; Dina Ebimbe (yellow card) 90'; Ndong (yellow card) 90+3'	Report	Hwang 33', 45'; De Préville 50'; Bašić (yellow card) 90+3'	Stadium: Stade Gaston Gérard; Attendance: 0 Referee: Thomas Léonard

21 March 2021 30	Dijon	0–1	Reims	Dijon
15:00 CET (UTC+1)	Baldé (yellow card) 59'; Ndong (yellow card) 78'; Lautoa (yellow card) 87'	Report	Dia 50'	Stadium: Stade Gaston Gérard; Attendance: 0 Referee: Benoît Bastien

4 April 2021 31	Marseille	2–0	Dijon	Marseille
21:00 CEST (UTC+2)	Álvaro (yellow card) 32', (goal) 79'; Balerdi 45+1'; Gueye (yellow card) 73'	Report	Konaté (yellow card) 9'; Benzia (yellow card) 24'; Muzinga (yellow card) 38'; Coulibaly (yellow card) 78'	Stadium: Stade Vélodrome; Attendance: 0 Referee: Ruddy Buquet

11 April 2021 32	Monaco	3–0	Dijon	Monaco
17:05 CEST (UTC+2)	Ben Yedder (penalty missed) 49', 63', 89' (pen.); Jovetić 49'; Maripán (yellow card) 67'	Report	Ecuele Manga (yellow card) 48'	Stadium: Stade Louis II; Attendance: 0 Referee: Aurélien Petit

18 April 2021 33	Dijon	2–0	Nice	Dijon
15:00 CEST (UTC+2)	Chafik (yellow card) 19', (goal) 49'; Benzia 77' (pen.)	Report	Schneiderlin (yellow card) 51'	Stadium: Stade Gaston Gérard; Attendance: 0 Referee: Johan Hamel

25 April 2021 34	Rennes	5–1	Dijon	Rennes
15:00 CEST (UTC+2)	Terrier 16', 71'; Nyamsi (yellow card) 18', (goal) 81'; Truffert (yellow card) 40'; Camavinga (yellow card) 57'; Nzonzi (yellow card) 59'; Tait 72'; Dalbert (yellow card) 76'; Del Castillo (yellow card) 86'; Grenier 90+1'	Report	Benzia 9' (pen.); Panzo (yellow card) 43'; Coulibaly (yellow card) 81'; Celina (yellow card) 86'	Stadium: Roazhon Park; Attendance: 0 Referee: Jérémy Stinat

2 May 2021 35	Dijon	1–5	Metz	Dijon
15:00 CEST (UTC+2)	Celina (red card) 43'; Baldé 48'; Lautoa (yellow card) 83'	Report	Yade (yellow card) 5'; Gueye 37'; Sarr 42'; Chafik 71' (o.g.); Vagner 82'; Bronn 85'	Stadium: Stade Gaston Gérard; Attendance: 0 Referee: Frank Schneider

9 May 2021 36	Angers	3–0	Dijon	Angers
15:00 CEST (UTC+2)	Fulgini 7'; Allagbé 50' (o.g.); Diony 89'	Report		Stadium: Stade Raymond Kopa; Attendance: 0 Referee: Jérôme Brisard

16 May 2021 37	Dijon	0–4	Nantes	Dijon
21:00 CEST (UTC+2)	Marié (yellow card) 27'; Ecuele Manga (yellow card) 85'	Report	Coulibaly 6', (yellow card) 61'; Kolo Muani 32', 90+2'; Blas 90+1'	Stadium: Stade Gaston Gérard; Attendance: 0 Referee: Karim Abed

23 May 2021 38	Saint-Étienne	0–1	Dijon	Saint-Étienne
21:00 CEST (UTC+2)	Gourna-Douath (yellow card) 56'	Report	Kamara 39'; Konaté (penalty missed) 76'	Stadium: Stade Geoffroy-Guichard; Attendance: 0 Referee: Antony Gautier

=== Coupe de France ===
10 February 2021 Round of 64	Dijon	0–1	Lille	Dijon
19:00 CET (UTC+1)	Chalá (yellow card) 64'	Report	Camara 15'	Stadium: Stade Gaston Gérard; Attendance: 0 Referee: Willy Delajod

== Statistics ==
=== Goalscorers ===
As of 16 October 2020

Rank	No.	Pos	Nat	Name	Ligue 1	Coupe de France	Total
1	25	DF	(Gabon)	Bruno Ecuele Manga	1	0	1
1	8	MF	(France)	Eric Dina-Ebimbe	1	0	1
1	17	MF	(Guinea-Bissau)	Mama Baldé	1	0	1
1	27	FW	(France)	Aurélien Scheidler	1	0	1
Totals					4	0	4
