= 2007–08 Dijon FCO season =

Dijon FCO
2007–08 season
- President: Bernard Gnecchi
- Head coach: Serge Romano (until 17 December); Faruk Hadžibegić (from 22 December)
- Stadium: Stade Gaston Gérard
- Ligue 2: 17th
- Coupe de France: Quarter-finals
- Coupe de la Ligue: Second round
- Top goalscorer: League: Schumacher; Stéphane Mangione (6 each); All: Schumacher; Stéphane Mangione (6 each)
- Biggest defeat: Gueugnon 4–0 Dijon

The 2007–08 Dijon FCO season was the club's 10th season in existence and the club's fourth consecutive season in the second division of French football. In addition to the domestic league, Dijon participated in this season's edition of the Coupe de France and Coupe de la Ligue. The season covered the period from 1 July 2007 to 30 June 2008.

== Pre-season and friendlies ==
Win Draw Loss

2007 Friendly	v	Dijon
--:-- CEST (UTC+2)

== Competitions ==
=== Overview ===
Competition	First match	Last match	Starting round	Final position	Record							
Competition	First match	Last match	Starting round	Final position	Pld	W	D	L	GF	GA	GD	Win %
Ligue 2	27 July 2007	16 May 2008	Matchday 1	17th	38	9	15	14	32	51	−19	23.68
Coupe de France	24 November 2007	15 April 2008	Seventh round	Quarter-finals	6	3	2	1	8	3	+5	50.00
Coupe de la Ligue	28 August 2007		Second round	Second round	1	0	1	0	1	1	+0	0.00
Total					45	12	18	15	41	55	−14	26.67

Source: Competitions

=== Ligue 2 ===
==== League table ====
Pos	Team	Pld	W	D	L	GF	GA	GD	Pts	Promotion or Relegation
15	Châteauroux	38	11	12	15	34	42	−8	45	
16	Boulogne	38	12	7	19	37	54	−17	43	
17	Dijon	38	9	15	14	32	51	−19	42	
18	Niort (R)	38	11	8	19	38	48	−10	41	Relegation to Championnat National
19	Libourne-Saint-Seurin (R)	38	7	11	20	41	62	−21	32	Relegation to Championnat National

Source: Ligue 2
(R) Relegated

==== Results summary ====
Overall								Home						Away					
Pld	W	D	L	GF	GA	GD	Pts	W	D	L	GF	GA	GD	W	D	L	GF	GA	GD
0	0	0	0	0	0	0	0	0	0	0	0	0	0	0	0	0	0	0	0

==== Results by round ====
Round	1	2	3	4	5	6	7	8	9	10	11	12	13	14	15	16	17	18	19	20	21	22	23	24	25	26	27	28	29	30	31	32	33	34	35	36	37	38
Ground	H	A	H	A	H	A	H	A	H	A	H	A	H	A	A	H	A	H	A	H	A	H	A	H	A	H	A	H	A	H	A	H	H	A	H	A	H	A
Result	D	D	W	W	D	W	L	L	D	D	D	L	W	L	L	L	D	L	D	L	D	D	L	D	L	W	D	W	L	W	L	D	D	W	W	L	L	D
Position																																						

A = Away; H = Home; W = Win; D = Draw; L = Loss

==== Matches ====
27 July 2007 1	Dijon	1–1	Ajaccio	Dijon
20:00	Zywiecki 24'	Report	Mandrichi 33'	Stadium: Stade Gaston Gérard; Attendance: 5,041; Referee: Nicolas Rainville

3 August 2007 2	Montpellier	1–1	Dijon	Montpellier
20:00	Lacombe 13'	Report	Linarès 25'	Stadium: Stade de la Mosson; Attendance: 8,293; Referee: Bruno Coué

10 August 2007 3	Dijon	1–0	Amiens	Dijon
20:00	Robail 62'	Report		Stadium: Stade Gaston Gérard; Attendance: 4,333; Referee: Didier Falcone

17 August 2007 4	Sedan	0–1	Dijon	Sedan
20:00		Report	Sahnoun 3' (pen.)	Stadium: Stade Louis Dugauguez; Attendance: 10,290; Referee: Jean-Charles Cailleux

24 August 2007 5	Dijon	0–0	Châteauroux	Dijon
20:00		Report		Stadium: Stade Gaston Gérard; Attendance: 5,664; Referee: Gérald Gregoire

31 August 2007 6	Stade Reims	0–1	Dijon	Reims
20:30		Report	Poyet 65'	Stadium: Stade Auguste-Delaune; Attendance: 7,810; Referee: Wilfried Bien

14 September 2007 7	Dijon	2–3	Le Havre	Dijon
20:30	Mandanne 45+1', 58' (pen.)	Report	Hoarau 52' (pen.); Nikezic 62', 70'	Stadium: Stade Gaston Gérard; Attendance: 4,886; Referee: Philippe Chat

21 September 2007 8	Clermont	3–0	Dijon	Clermont
19:30	Mendy 13'; Chaussidière 62' (pen.); Carlier 90+1'	Report		Stadium: Stade Gabriel-Montpied; Attendance: 3,839; Referee: Stéphane Bré

28 September 2007 9	Dijon	2–2	Brest	Dijon
20:30		Report		Stadium: Stade Gaston Gérard; Referee: Pascal Vileo

2 October 2007 10	Bastia	0–0	Dijon	Furiani

5 October 2007 11	Dijon	0–0	Nantes	Dijon
				Stadium: Stade Gaston Gérard

19 October 2007 12	Gueugnon	4–0	Dijon	Gueugnon

26 October 2007 13	Dijon	3–1	Libourne-Saint-Seurin	Dijon
				Stadium: Stade Gaston Gérard

2 November 2007 14	Grenoble	2–0	Dijon	Grenoble

6 November 2007 15	Troyes	3–0	Dijon	Troyes

9 November 2007 16	Dijon	0–2	Boulogne	Dijon
				Stadium: Stade Gaston Gérard

30 November 2007 17	Guingamp	0–0	Dijon	Guingamp

7 December 2007 18	Dijon	1–3	Niort	Dijon
				Stadium: Stade Gaston Gérard

21 December 2007 19	Angers	0–0	Dijon	Angers

11 January 2008 20	Dijon	0–2	Montpellier	Dijon
				Stadium: Stade Gaston Gérard

18 January 2008 21	Amiens	2–2	Dijon	Amiens

25 January 2008 22	Dijon	1–1	Sedan	Dijon
				Stadium: Stade Gaston Gérard

8 February 2008 23	Châteauroux	2–0	Dijon	Châteauroux

15 February 2008 24	Dijon	2–2	Stade Reims	Dijon
				Stadium: Stade Gaston Gérard

22 February 2008 25	Le Havre	1–0	Dijon	Le Havre

29 February 2008 26	Dijon	3–1	Clermont	Dijon
				Stadium: Stade Gaston Gérard

7 March 2008 27	Brest	0–0	Dijon	Brest

14 March 2008 28	Dijon	2–1	Bastia	Dijon
				Stadium: Stade Gaston Gérard

21 March 2008 29	Nantes	2–1	Dijon	Nantes

28 March 2008 30	Dijon	2–1	Gueugnon	Dijon
				Stadium: Stade Gaston Gérard

4 April 2008 31	Libourne-Saint-Seurin	2–0	Dijon	Libourne
20:00		Report		Stadium: Stade Jean-Antoine Moueix

11 April 2008 32	Dijon	0–0	Grenoble	Dijon
20:00		Report		Stadium: Stade Gaston Gérard

18 April 2008 34	Boulogne	0–1	Dijon	Boulogne-sur-Mer
20:00		Report	Mangione 35'	Stadium: Stade de la Libération

22 April 2008 33	Dijon	2–2	Troyes	Dijon
20:00	Mangione 14'; Sahnoun 16'	Report	Enza Yamissi 33'; Beauvue 90+2'	Stadium: Stade Gaston Gérard

25 April 2008 35	Dijon	1–0	Guingamp	Dijon
20:00		Report		Stadium: Stade Gaston Gérard

2 May 2008 36	Niort	3–0	Dijon	Niort
20:00		Report		Stadium: Stade René Gaillard

12 May 2008 37	Dijon	1–3	Angers	Dijon
20:30	Linarès 57' (pen.)	Report	Lecluse 13'; Efoulou 35', 81'	Stadium: Stade Gaston Gérard; Attendance: 7,252; Referee: Frédy Fautrel

16 May 2008 38	Ajaccio	1–1	Dijon	Ajaccio
20:45	Mangani 84'	Report	Mandanne 49'	Stadium: Stade François Coty; Attendance: 2,226; Referee: Saïd Ennjimi

=== Coupe de France ===
24 November 2007 Seventh round	Dijon	1–0 (a.e.t.)	Jura Sud Foot	Dijon
	Mandanne 116'			Stadium: Stade Gaston Gérard; Referee: Sébastien Desiage

16 December 2007 Eighth round	Dijon	2–1	Clermont	Dijon
	Linarès 8'; Schumacher 90'		Schumacher 69' (o.g.)	Stadium: Stade Gaston Gérard; Attendance: 4,500; Referee: Dominique Fraise

5 January 2008 Round of 64	US Avranches	0–2	Dijon	Avranches
			Vosahlo 5'; Esteves 66'	Stadium: Stade René Fenouillère; Attendance: 3,120; Referee: Gael Lecellier

2 February 2008 Round of 32	Paris FC	0–0 (a.e.t.) (5–6 p)	Dijon	Paris
				Stadium: Stade Charléty; Attendance: 4,714; Referee: Stade Charléty

18 March 2008 Round of 16	Dijon	3–1	Tours FC	Dijon
	Boateng 52'; Schumacher 62', 90'		Atik 84'	Stadium: Stade Gaston Gérard; Attendance: 3,635; Referee: Fatih Atik

15 April 2008 Quarter-finals	Amiens	1–0	Dijon	Amiens
	Contout 87'			Stadium: Stade de la Licorne; Attendance: 11,419; Referee: Damien Ledentu

=== Coupe de la Ligue ===
28 August 2007 Second round	Montpellier	1–1 (5–3 p)	Dijon	Montpellier
20:00	Camara 888'		Larcier 34'	Stadium: Stade de la Mosson; Attendance: 3,682; Referee: Stéphane Djouzi

== Statistics ==
=== Goalscorers ===
Rank	No.	Pos	Nat	Name	Ligue 2	Coupe de France	Coupe de la Ligue	Total
1		FW	(Brazil)	Schumacher	3	3	0	6
1		FW	(France)	Stéphane Mangione	6	0	0	6
3		FW	(Réunion)	Christophe Mandanne	4	1	0	5
4		MF	(Democratic Republic of the Congo)	Yannick Yenga	4	0	0	4
5		MF	(France)	David Linarès	2	1	0	3
5		MF	(France)	Nicolas Sahnoun	3	0	0	3
5		DF	(France)	Anthony Vosahlo	2	1	0	3
Totals					32	8	1	41
