= Senou Coulibaly =

Malian footballer (born 1994)

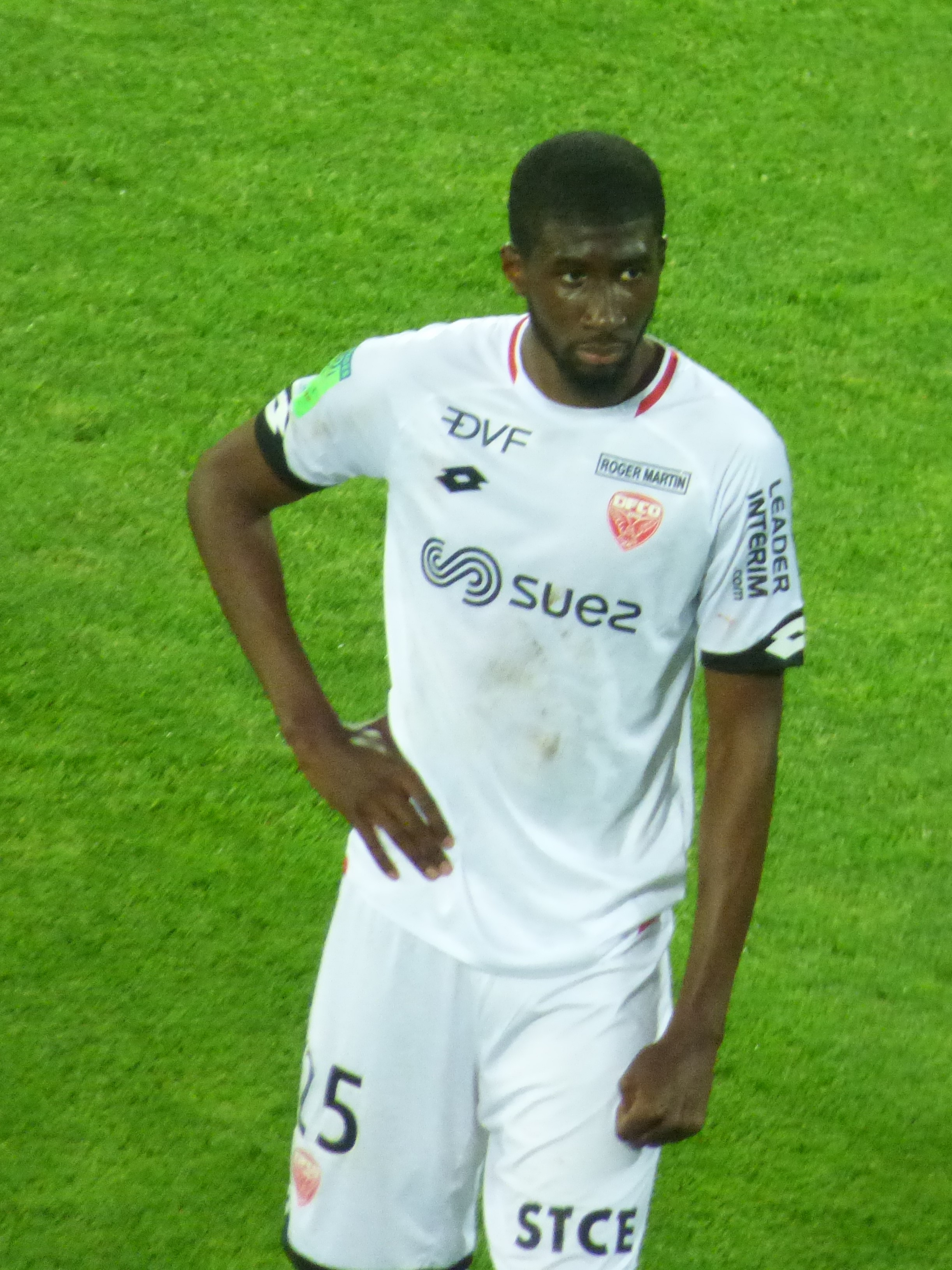
- Coulibaly in 2019 with Dijon

Personal information
- Date of birth: 4 September 1994 (age 32)
- Place of birth: Pontoise, France
- Height: 1.93 m (6 ft 4 in)
- Position: Centre-back

Team information
- Current team: Omonia
- Number: 5

Youth career
- 2013–2017: Cergy-Pontoise FC

Senior career*
Years	Team	Apps	(Gls)
2017–2018	FC Mantois	25	(0)
2018–2021	Dijon II	7	(0)
2018–2023	Dijon	97	(5)
2023–	Omonia	86	(8)

International career^{‡}
2021	Mali	3	(0)
- * Club domestic league appearances and goals as of 31 May 2026 ‡ National team caps and goals as of 20:48, 14 November 2021 (UTC)

Senou Coulibaly (born 4 September 1994) is a professional footballer who plays as a centre-back for Omonia. Born in France, he plays for the Mali national team.

== Club career ==
Coulibaly is a youth product of Cergy Pontoise FC, and joined FC Mantois in 2017.

On 13 June 2018, Coulibaly joined Ligue 1 side Dijon from Mantes in the fourth division of France. He made his professional debut for Dijon in a 2–1 Ligue 1 win over Montpellier on 11 August 2018, wherein he scored the game-winning goal in extra-time.

== International career ==
Born in France, Coulibaly is Malian by descent. He debuted with the Mali national team in a friendly 1–1 tie with DR Congo on 11 June 2021.

== Career statistics ==
=== Club ===
As of match played 25 January 2025

Appearances and goals by club, season and competition
Club	Season	League			National cup (Note: Includes Coupe de France, Cypriot Cup)		League cup (Note: Includes Coupe de la Ligue)		Continental		Other		Total	
Club	Season	Division	Apps	Goals	Apps	Goals	Apps	Goals	Apps	Goals	Apps	Goals	Apps	Goals
FC Mantois	2017–18	Championnat National 2	25	0	0	0	0	0	—		—		25	0
Dijon	2018–19	Ligue 1	11	1	3	0	1	0	—		—		15	1
Dijon	2019–20	Ligue 1	9	0	2	0	1	0	—		—		12	0
Dijon	2020–21	Ligue 1	22	2	0	0	—		—		—		22	2
Dijon	2021–22	Ligue 2	30	2	0	0	—		—		—		30	2
Dijon	2022–23	Ligue 2	27	0	1	0	—		—		—		28	0
Dijon	Total		99	5	6	0	2	0	0	0	0	0	107	5
Omonia	2023–24	Cypriot First Division	27	0	5	0	—		4 (Note: Appearances in UEFA Conference League)	1	1 (Note: Appearance in Cypriot Super Cup)	0	37	1
Omonia	2024–25	Cypriot First Division	32	3	3	0	—		11	3	—		46	6
Omonia	Total		59	3	8	0	0	0	15	4	1	0	83	7
Career total			169	8	11	0	2	0	15	4	1	0	198	12

== Honours ==
Omonia

- Cypriot First Division: 2025–26
