= Wilitty Younoussa =

Cameroonian footballer

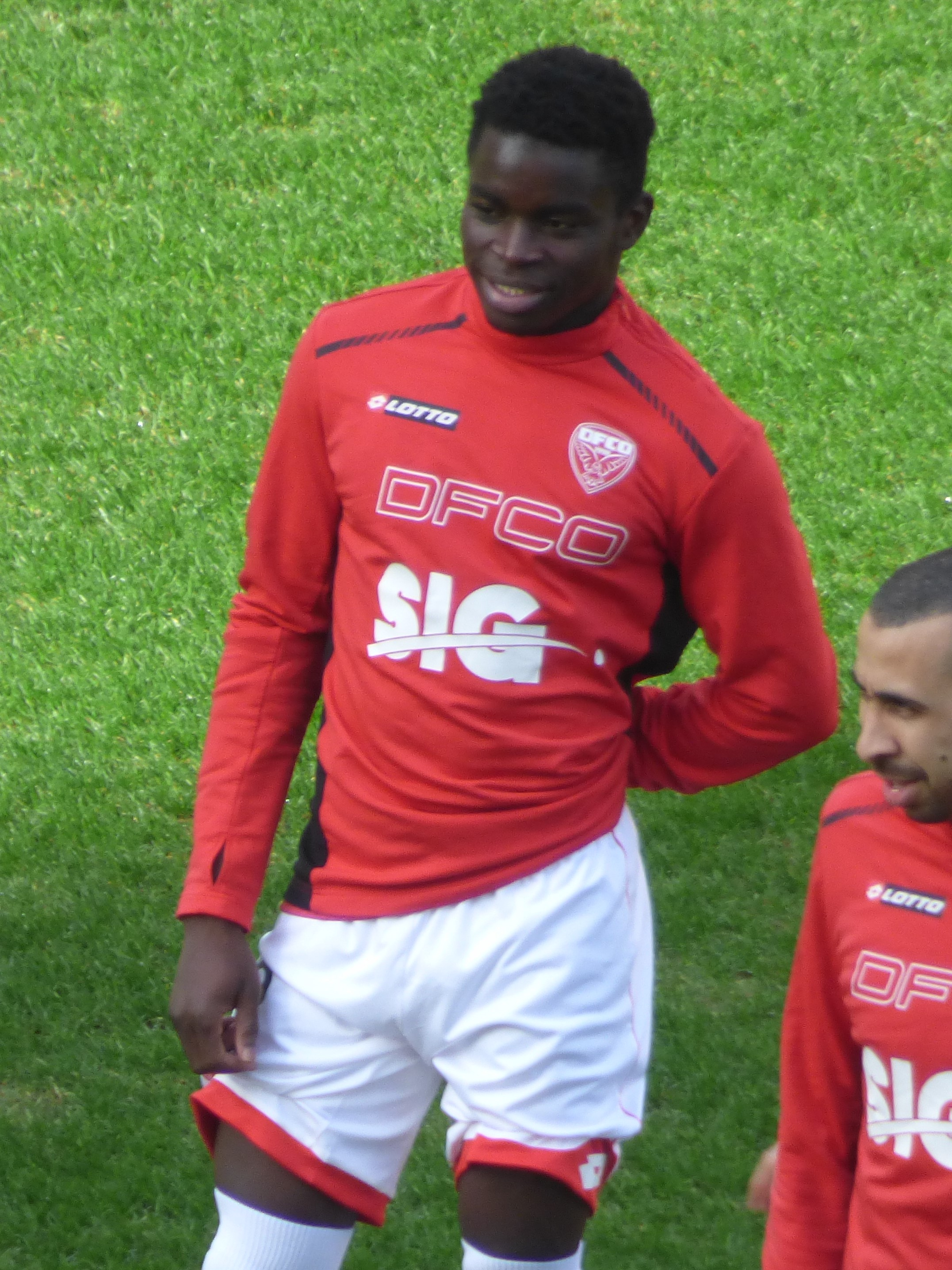
- Younoussa in 2021

Personal information
- Date of birth: 9 September 2001 (age 25)
- Place of birth: Tcholliré, Cameroon
- Height: 1.74 m (5 ft 9 in)
- Position: Midfielder

Team information
- Current team: Nantes
- Number: 23

Youth career
- 2009–2020: Tcholliré

Senior career*
Years	Team	Apps	(Gls)
2020–2022	Dijon	23	(0)
2020–2022	Dijon II	7	(0)
2022–2026	Rodez	121	(5)
2026–	Nantes	0	(0)

International career^{‡}
2017	Cameroon U17	1	(0)
2025–	Cameroon	2	(0)
- * Club domestic league appearances and goals as of 11 May 2026 ‡ National team caps and goals as of 9 June 2025

Wilitty Younoussa (born 9 September 2001) is a Cameroonian professional footballer who plays as a midfielder for French Ligue 2 club Nantes and the Cameroon national team.

== Club career ==
On 13 March 2020, Younoussa signed his first professional contract with Dijon FCO. Younoussa made his professional debut with Dijon in a 2–0 Ligue 1 loss to Brest on 13 September 2020.

On 23 August 2022, Younoussa signed a two-year contract with Rodez.

On 23 June 2026, Younoussa moved to Nantes on a two-season deal.

== International career ==
Younoussa represented the Cameroon U17s at the 2017 Africa U-17 Cup of Nations.

== Career statistics ==
As of match played 10 May 2025

Appearances and goals by club, season and competition
Club	Season	League			Cup		Other		Total	
Club	Season	Division	Apps	Goals	Apps	Goals	Apps	Goals	Apps	Goals
Dijon	2020–21	Ligue 1	3	0	0	0	—		3	0
Dijon	2021–22	Ligue 2	20	0	0	0	—		20	0
Dijon	Total		23	0	0	0	—		23	0
Dijon II	2020–21	National 3	2	0	—		—		2	0
Dijon II	2021–22	National 3	5	0	—		—		5	0
Dijon II	Total		7	0	—		—		7	0
Rodez II	2022–23	National 3	1	0	—		—		1	0
Rodez	2022–23	Ligue 2	27	1	4	1	—		31	2
Rodez	2023–24	Ligue 2	37	3	3	0	2 (Note: Appearances in Ligue 1 relegation/promotion play-offs)	0	42	3
Rodez	2024–25	Ligue 2	34	1	0	0	—		34	1
Rodez	Total		98	5	7	1	2	0	107	6
Career total			129	5	7	1	2	0	138	6

=== International ===
As of match played 9 June 2025

Appearances and goals by national team and year
National team	Year	Apps	Goals
Cameroon	2025	2	0
Total		2	0
