= Alexandru Dobre =

Romanian footballer

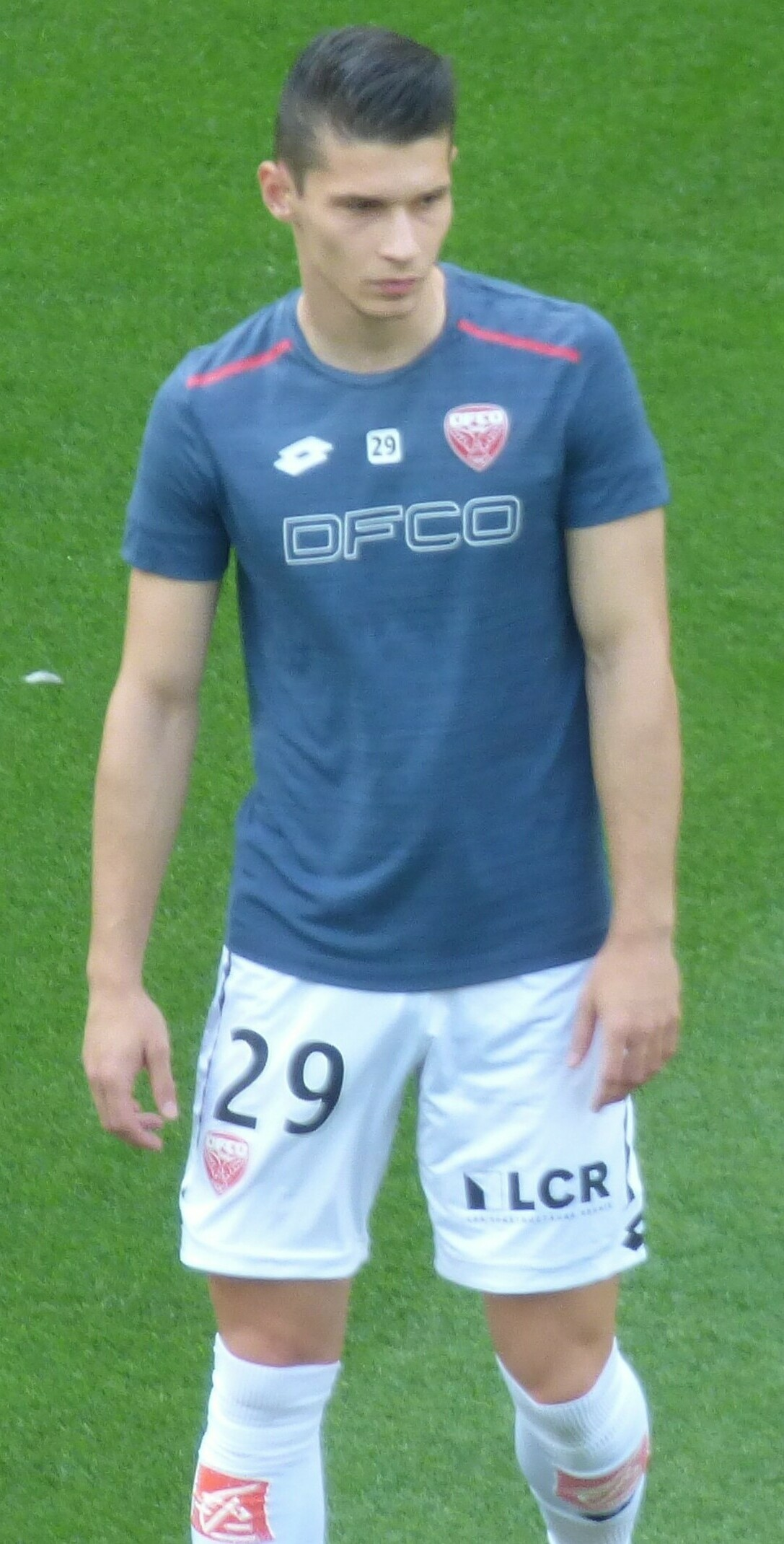
- Dobre training for Dijon in 2020

Personal information
- Full name: Mihai Alexandru Dobre
- Date of birth: 30 August 1998 (age 28)
- Place of birth: Bucharest, Romania
- Height: 1.85 m (6 ft 1 in)
- Position: Winger

Team information
- Current team: Rapid București
- Number: 29

Youth career
- –2013: Steaua București
- 2013–2016: Viitorul Mihai Georgescu Cluj
- 2016–2017: Bournemouth

Senior career*
Years	Team	Apps	(Gls)
2017–2020	Bournemouth	0	(0)
2017–2018	→ Bury (loan)	10	(0)
2018	→ Rochdale (loan)	5	(1)
2019	→ Yeovil Town (loan)	21	(1)
2020	→ Wigan Athletic (loan)	1	(0)
2020–2023	Dijon	53	(9)
2020–2023	Dijon B	7	(2)
2023	→ Famalicão (loan)	17	(2)
2023–2024	Famalicão	14	(0)
2024–	Rapid București	81	(28)

International career^{‡}
2015	Romania U17	3	(0)
2017–2019	Romania U21	8	(1)
2021	Romania Olympic	5	(0)
2023–	Romania	7	(0)
- * Club domestic league appearances and goals as of 7 November 2026 ‡ National team caps and goals as of 2 June 2026

Mihai Alexandru Dobre (born 30 August 1998) is a Romanian professional footballer who plays as a winger for Liga I club Rapid București and the Romania national team.

Dobre started out as a senior in England with AFC Bournemouth, but only recorded one competitive game and was loaned out several times. In 2020, he moved to French side Dijon on a full transfer.

Internationally, Dobre represented the Romania under-23 team in the 2020 Summer Olympics. In March 2023, he made his full debut for the nation in a 2–0 win over Andorra.

== Club career ==
=== Early career ===
Born in Bucharest, Dobre signed for English team AFC Bournemouth from Viitorul Mihai Georgescu Cluj in August 2016, and initially linked up with their under-21 squad.

On 30 August 2017, he moved to League One side Bury on loan until 1 January 2018. Dobre made his English Football League debut for Bury in an away game against Rotherham United, coming on as a substitute for Jordan Williams in the 55th minute. On 18 January 2018, he joined Bury's Lancashire rivals Rochdale on loan until the end of the season. On 11 January 2019, Dobre again moved on loan to EFL League Two club Yeovil Town until the end of the 2018–19 campaign.

On 4 January 2020, Dobre registered his competitive debut for AFC Bournemouth by coming on as a substitute in a 4–0 FA Cup victory over Luton Town. On 31 January, he was sent on loan to Wigan Athletic for the remainder of the season.

=== Dijon ===
On 12 August 2020, Dobre signed for Ligue 1 club Dijon for a transfer fee of £900,000.

==== Loan to Famalicão ====
On 8 January 2023, Dobre joined Famalicão in Portugal on loan until the end of the season.

=== Famalicão ===
On 31 July 2023, Famalicão announced the permanent signing of Dobre on a two-year deal, for a reported fee of €600,000.

=== Rapid București ===
On 7 October 2024, Rapid București announced the signing of Dobre until June 2026.

== International career ==
In June 2021, Dobre was selected in Romania's squad for the postponed 2020 Summer Olympics. He received his first call-up to the senior team in March 2023, for the UEFA Euro 2024 qualification matches against Andorra and Belarus. Dobre made his full debut on the 25th that month, coming on as a substitute for Olimpiu Moruțan in the 2–0 win against the former opponent.

== Career statistics ==
=== Club ===
As of match played 7 November 2026

Appearances and goals by club, season and competition
Club	Season	League			National cup (Note: Includes FA Cup, Coupe de France, Taça de Portugal, Cupa României)		Europe		Other		Total	
Club	Season	Division	Apps	Goals	Apps	Goals	Apps	Goals	Apps	Goals	Apps	Goals
Bournemouth	2019–20	Premier League	0	0	1	0	—		—		1	0
Bury (loan)	2017–18	League One	10	0	1	0	—		1 (Note: Appearance in EFL Trophy)	0	12	0
Rochdale (loan)	2017–18	League One	5	1	—		—		—		5	1
Yeovil Town (loan)	2018–19	League Two	21	1	—		—		—		21	1
Wigan Athletic (loan)	2019–20	Championship	1	0	—		—		—		1	0
Dijon	2020–21	Ligue 1	22	0	1	0	—		—		23	0
Dijon	2021–22	Ligue 2	28	9	3	0	—		—		31	9
Dijon	2022–23	Ligue 2	3	0	1	0	—		—		4	0
Dijon	Total		53	9	5	0	—		—		58	9
Dijon B	2020–21	Championnat National 3	3	0	—		—		—		3	0
Dijon B	2021–22	Championnat National 3	1	2	—		—		—		1	2
Dijon B	2022–23	Championnat National 3	3	0	—		—		—		3	0
Dijon B	Total		7	2	—		—		—		7	2
Famalicão (loan)	2022–23	Primeira Liga	17	2	3	1	—		0	0	20	3
Famalicão	2023–24	Primeira Liga	14	0	2	1	—		0	0	16	1
Famalicão	Total		31	2	5	2	—		0	0	36	4
Rapid București	2024–25	Liga I	27	7	5	1	—		—		32	8
Rapid București	2025–26	Liga I	39	15	3	2	—		—		42	17
Rapid București	2026–27	Liga I	15	6	2	0	—		—		17	6
Rapid București	Total		81	28	10	3	—		—		91	31
Career total			209	43	22	5	—		1	0	232	48

=== International ===
As of match played 2 June 2026

Appearances and goals by national team and year
National team	Year	Apps	Goals
Romania
Romania	2023	2	0
Romania	2024	0	0
Romania	2025	3	0
Romania	2026	2	0
Total		7	0
