= Yassine Benzia =

Footballer (born 1994)

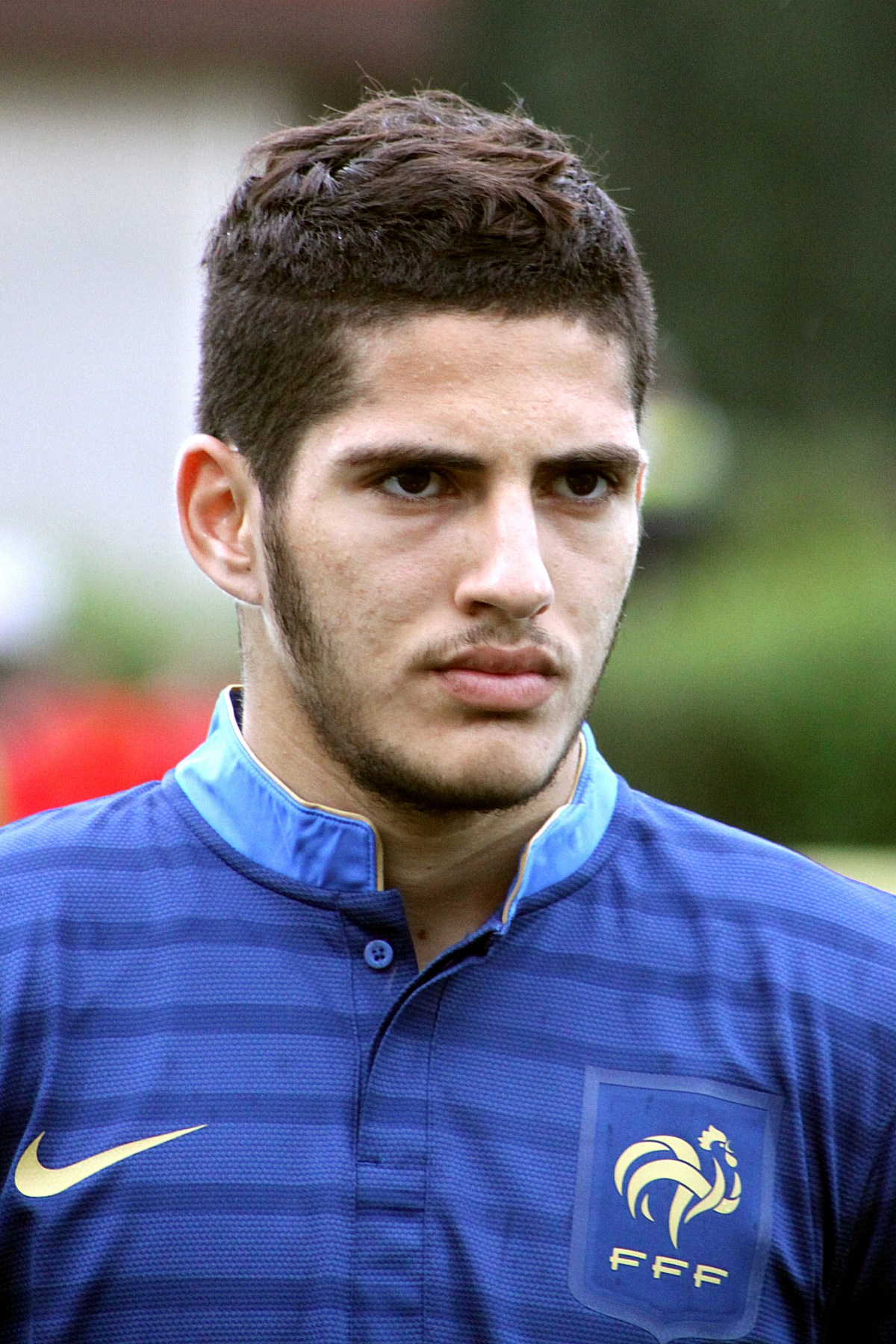
- Benzia with France U19 in 2013

Personal information
- Date of birth: 8 September 1994 (age 32)
- Place of birth: Saint-Aubin-lès-Elbeuf, France
- Height: 1.81 m (5 ft 11 in)
- Position: Midfielder

Youth career
- 2000–2005: Saint-Aubin
- 2005–2006: Oissel
- 2006–2009: Caudebecais
- 2009–2010: Quevilly
- 2010–2012: Lyon

Senior career*
Years	Team	Apps	(Gls)
2011–2015	Lyon	38	(4)
2011–2015	→ Lyon II	38	(19)
2015–2020	Lille	81	(9)
2015–2016	→ Lille II	3	(1)
2018–2019	→ Fenerbahçe (loan)	13	(0)
2019–2020	→ Olympiacos (loan)	5	(0)
2020–2022	Dijon	27	(6)
2022	→ Hatayspor (loan)	12	(2)
2023–2025	Qarabağ	62	(19)
2025–2026	Al-Fayha	29	(4)

International career^{‡}
2010	France U16	3	(0)
2011	France U17	6	(4)
2011–2012	France U18	9	(9)
2012–2013	France U19	16	(7)
2013–2015	France U21	9	(6)
2016–	Algeria	20	(6)
Medal record
Men's football
Representing Algeria
FIFA Series
Winner	2024 Algeria
Representing France
UEFA European Under-19 Championship
Runner-up	2013 Lithuania
- * Club domestic league appearances and goals as of 4 May 2026 ‡ National team caps and goals as of 12 December 2025

Yassine Benzia (Arabic: ياسين بنزية; born 8 September 1994) is a professional footballer who plays as an attacking midfielder. Born in France, he has played for the Algeria national team.

Benzia began his professional career at Lyon, where he played 53 total games and scored 6 goals, winning the 2012 Trophée des Champions. In August 2015, he was signed by Lille.

Benzia was a France youth international, having played at under-16, under-17, under-18 and under-21 level. He played with the under-17 team at the 2011 FIFA U-17 World Cup. In March 2016, FIFA approved his request to change his international allegiance to Algeria.

== Club career ==
=== Lyon ===
Following the 2011 FIFA U-17 World Cup Benzia signed his first professional contract with Lyon, agreeing to a three-year deal on 27 October 2011. He was subsequently promoted to the senior team by manager Rémi Garde and assigned the number 25 shirt. Benzia made his professional debut on 20 May 2012 in the last game of the league season at home to Nice, appearing as a substitute for Jimmy Briand for the final minutes of the 4–3 loss.

Benzia came on as a 66th-minute substitute for Bafétimbi Gomis in the 2012 Trophée des Champions against Montpellier at New Jersey's Red Bull Arena on 28 July, and scored in Lyon's penalty shootout victory after a 2–2 draw. On 22 November, he scored his first professional goal to open a 1–1 draw at Sparta Prague in the group stage of the UEFA Europa League. He scored again in the competition's next game, a 2–0 win at the Stade de Gerland against Hapoel Ironi Kiryat Shmona, but did not find the net again for the rest of the season.

On 16 August 2013, Benzia scored his first Ligue 1 goal, opening a 3–1 win at Sochaux on the first day of the season and also assisting Alexandre Lacazette and Yoann Gourcuff for the other two goals. He added his only other goal of the season on 8 December in a win by the same score at Bastia.

=== Lille ===
On 31 August 2015, Benzia signed a four-year deal at fellow Ligue 1 club Lille for a fee of around €1 million.

On 28 January 2017, after over a year without a goal, Benzia scored both of Lille's goals in a 2–1 win on his return to Lyon.

==== Fenerbahçe (loan) ====
On 31 August 2018, the last day of the 2018 summer transfer window, Benzia joined Süper Lig side Fenerbahçe on loan for the season. Fenerbahçe also secured an option to sign him permanently.

==== Olympiacos (loan) ====
On 31 August 2019, the last day of the 2019 summer transfer window, Benzia joined Super League Greece side Olympiacos on loan for the season.

=== Dijon ===
On 30 January 2020, Benzia returned to France to join Dijon by signing a three-and-a-half-year contract. In May 2020, he sustained a serious injury to his left hand due to a buggy accident, which made him unavailable until 2021. On 18 April 2021, he scored his first goal from a penalty in a 2–0 win over Nice.

==== Hatayspor (loan) ====
On 8 February 2022, the last day of the Turkish winter transfer window, Benzia was loaned out to Hatayspor.

=== Qarabağ ===
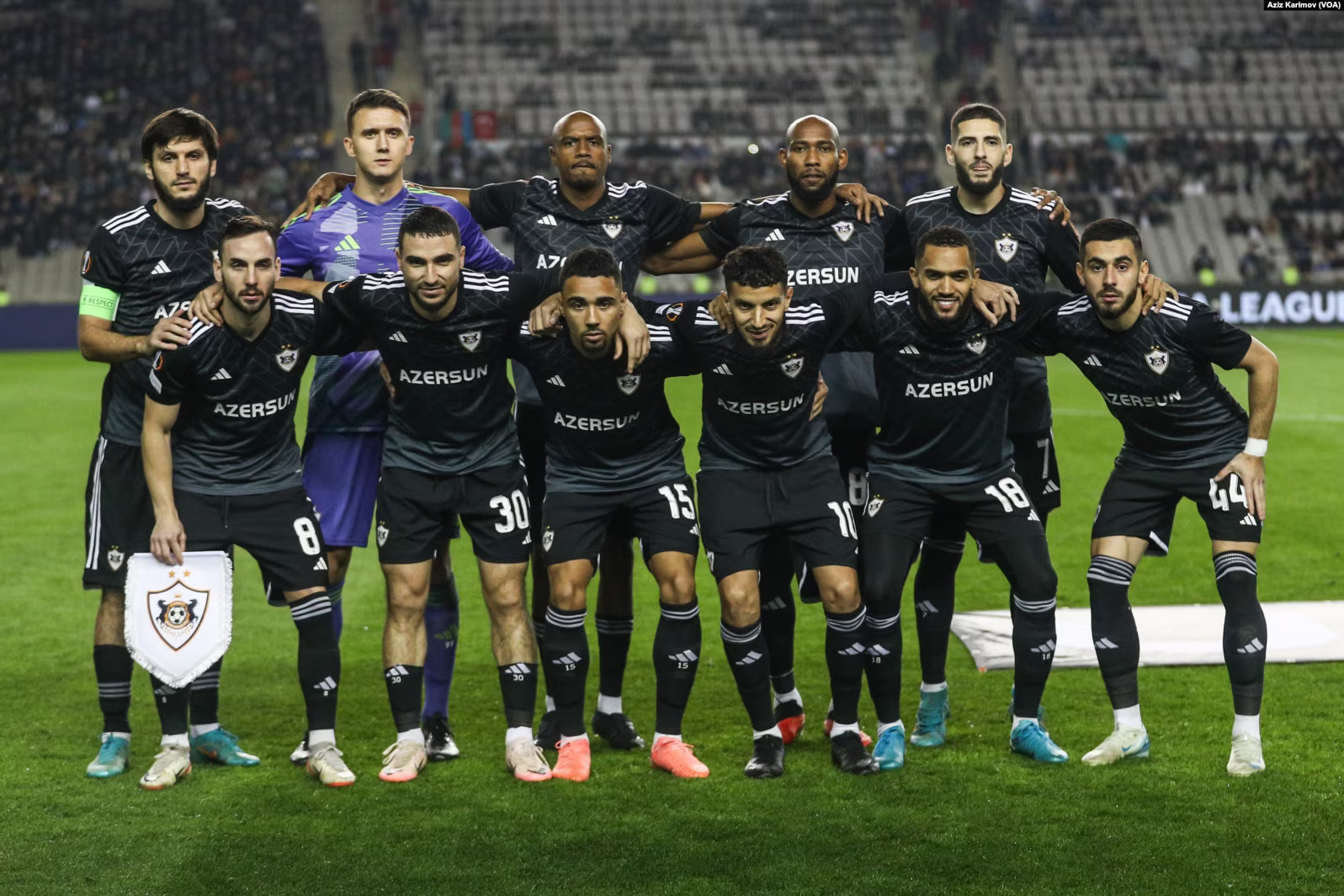
Benzia (#7) lining up with Qarabağ against Ajax in 2024

On 26 January 2023, Benzia signed for Qarabağ on a contract until 30 June 2025. On 11 July 2023, he scored his first goal in the stoppage time of a 2–1 away victory against Lincoln Red Imps within the first qualifying round of the UEFA Champions League.

On 11 June 2025, Qarabağ announced that Benzia had left the club at the end of his contract.

=== Al-Fayha ===
On 6 August 2025, Benzia joined Saudi Pro League club Al-Fayha on a one-year deal.

== International career ==
=== France ===
Benzia represented France at youth level. He played for France U17 during the 2011 FIFA U-17 World Cup, where he scored five goals in the tournament. He also scored two goals for France U19, as they reached the final of the 2013 UEFA European Under-19 Championship.

=== Algeria ===
In January 2016, Algerian Football Federation president Mohamed Raouraoua announced that Benzia had opted to switch his international allegiance to Algeria. In March 2016, FIFA approved his request to change his international allegiance. On 26 March 2016, he played his first game for Algeria, against Ethiopia in the 2017 Africa Cup of Nations qualification. He scored his first senior international goal on 2 June 2016 against Seychelles. On the 18th of November in 2024 he was voted as runner up in the FIFA Puskás Award, for his goal against South Africa on 26 March 2024, scoring the equalizer in the 70th minute to make it 3–3.

== Style of play ==
At the age of 17, Benzia was dubbed the new Karim Benzema.

== Personal life ==
Benzia's siblings, Farid and Mustapha, are also footballers.

On August 9, 2012, he participated in a photo shoot with Adidas Scouting Camp for the 2012 promotion.

In May 2020, Yassine Benzia suffered a serious hand injury following a buggy accident in the woods. The injury was severe enough to require surgery and raised concerns about the long-term functionality of his hand. Despite the gravity of the accident, Benzia was able to resume training with Dijon FCO six months later, although his injured hand was still heavily bandaged. This injury could have ended his career, but he managed to continue his professional football career.

== Career statistics ==
=== Club ===
As of match played 31 May 2025

Appearances and goals by club, season and competition
Club	Season	League			National cup (Note: Includes Coupe de France, Turkish Cup, Greek Football Cup, Azerbaijan Cup)		League cup (Note: Includes Coupe de la Ligue)		Europe		Other		Total	
Club	Season	Division	Apps	Goals	Apps	Goals	Apps	Goals	Apps	Goals	Apps	Goals	Apps	Goals
Lyon	2011–12	Ligue 1	1	0	—		—		—		—		1	0
Lyon	2012–13	Ligue 1	16	0	0	0	0	0	3 (Note: Appearances in UEFA Europa League)	2	1 (Note: Appearance in Trophée des champions)	0	21	2
Lyon	2013–14	Ligue 1	11	2	2	0	1	0	5 (Note: Three appearances in UEFA Champions League, two appearances in UEFA Europa League)	0	—		19	2
Lyon	2014–15	Ligue 1	10	2	0	0	1	0	2	0	—		13	2
Lyon	2015–16	Ligue 1	—		—		—		—		1	0	1	0
Lyon	Total		38	4	2	0	2	0	10	2	2	0	53	6
Lille	2015–16	Ligue 1	25	5	1	0	3	1	—		—		29	6
Lille	2016–17	Ligue 1	25	3	1	0	1	0	2	0	—		29	3
Lille	2017–18	Ligue 1	31	1	1	0	1	1	—		—		33	2
Lille	Total		81	9	3	0	5	2	2	0	—		91	11
Fenerbahçe	2018–19	Süper Lig	13	0	4	0	—		—		—		17	0
Olympiakos	2019–20	Super League Greece	5	0	1	0	—		3 (Note: Appearances in UEFA Champions League)	0	—		9	0
Dijon	2019–20	Ligue 1	3	0	1	0	0	0	—		—		4	0
Dijon	2020–21	Ligue 1	7	2	0	0	—		—		—		7	2
Dijon	2021–22	Ligue 2	17	4	1	0	—		—		—		18	4
Dijon	Total		27	6	2	0	0	0	—		—		29	6
Hatayspor	2021–22	Süper Lig	12	2	—		—		—		—		12	2
Qarabağ	2022–23	Azerbaijan Premier League	3	0	0	0	—		2 (Note: Appearances in the UEFA Europa Conference League)	0	—		5	0
Qarabağ	2023–24	Azerbaijan Premier League	27	12	4	0	—		18 (Note: Four appearances and one goal in the UEFA Champions League, fourteen appearances and three goals in UEFA Europa League)	4	—		49	16
Qarabağ	2024–25	Azerbaijan Premier League	32	7	5	2	—		13 (Note: Six appearances and three goals in the UEFA Champions League, seven appearances and zero goals in UEFA Europa League)	3	—		50	12
Qarabağ	Total		62	19	9	2	—		33	7	—		104	28
Career total			238	36	21	2	7	2	48	9	2	0	326	49

=== International ===
As of match played 6 December 2025

Appearances and goals by national team and year
National team	Year	Apps	Goals
Algeria	2016	2	1
Algeria	2018	2	0
Algeria	2024	9	3
Algeria	2024	5	2
Total		18	6

As of match played 6 December 2025
Algeria score listed first, score column indicates score after each Benzia goal

List of international goals scored by Yassine Benzia
No.	Date	Venue	Cap	Opponent	Score	Result	Competition
1	2 June 2016	Stade Linité, Victoria, Seychelles	2	Seychelles	1–0	2–0	2017 Africa Cup of Nations qualification
2	22 March 2024	Nelson Mandela Stadium, Algiers, Algeria	5	Bolivia	2–2	3–2	2024 FIFA Series
3	26 March 2024	Nelson Mandela Stadium, Algiers, Algeria	6	South Africa	1–0	3–3	2024 FIFA Series
4	26 March 2024	Nelson Mandela Stadium, Algiers, Algeria	6	South Africa	3–3	3–3	2024 FIFA Series
5	10 June 2025	Strawberry Arena, Solna, Sweden	15	Sweden	2–4	3–4	Friendly
6	6 December 2025	Khalifa International Stadium, Al Rayyan, Qatar	18	Bahrain	3–1	5–1	2025 FIFA Arab Cup

== Honours ==
Lyon

- Trophée des Champions: 2012

Qarabağ

- Azerbaijan Premier League: 2022–23

France U19

- UEFA European Under-19 Championship runner-up: 2013

Algeria

- FIFA Series: 2024 Algeria

Individual

- UEFA European Under-19 Championship: Team of the Tournament 2013
