= Erwan Belhadji =

French footballer (born 2001)

Personal information
- Date of birth: 22 June 2001 (age 25)
- Place of birth: Créteil, France
- Position: Forward

Team information
- Current team: Rumilly-Vallières
- Number: 19

Youth career
- Dijon

Senior career*
Years	Team	Apps	(Gls)
2018–2022	Dijon II	32	(4)
2021–2022	Dijon	3	(0)
2023–2024	RC France	25	(3)
2024–	Rumilly-Vallières	1	(0)
- * Club domestic league appearances and goals as of 30 November 2024

Erwan Belhadji (born 22 June 2001) is a French professional footballer who plays for Championnat National 1 side Rumilly-Vallières.

== Club career ==
Erwan Belhadji made his professional debut for Dijon on the 23 May 2021.

== Personal life ==
Belhadji was born in France and holds Senegalese nationality. He is the cousin of the footballer Mamadou Thiam.
