= Mounir Chouiar =

Moroccan footballer (born 1999)

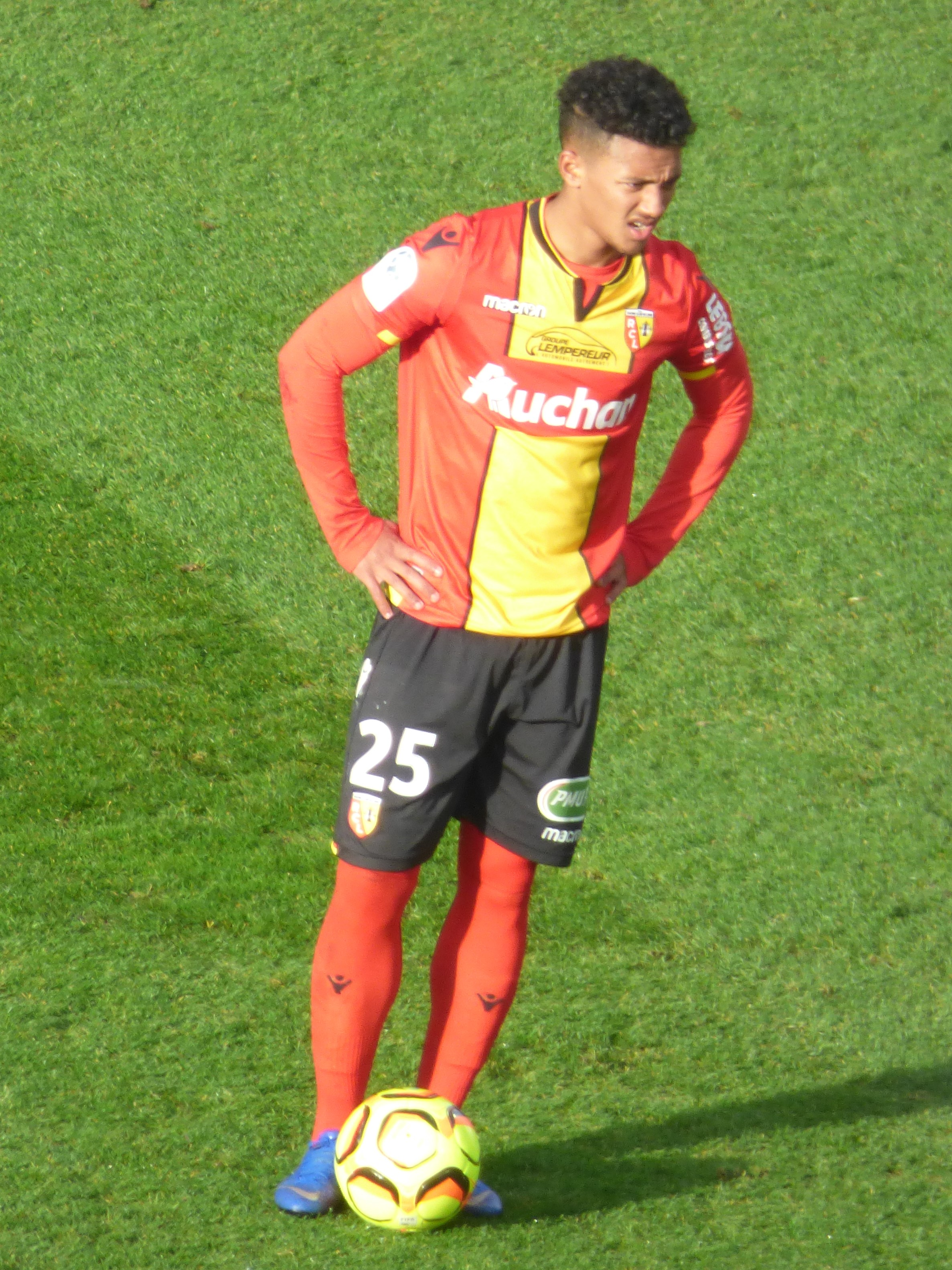
- Chouiar with Lens in 2019

Personal information
- Date of birth: 23 January 1999 (age 27)
- Place of birth: Liévin, France
- Height: 1.77 m (5 ft 10 in)
- Position: Left winger

Team information
- Current team: RS Berkane
- Number: 23

Youth career
- 2005–2007: CS Avion
- 2007–2016: Lens

Senior career*
Years	Team	Apps	(Gls)
2016–2019	Lens II	46	(11)
2016–2019	Lens	38	(5)
2019–2022	Dijon	43	(4)
2021–2022	→ Yeni Malatyaspor (loan)	26	(3)
2022–2023	İstanbul Başakşehir	16	(1)
2023	→ Kasımpaşa (loan)	16	(2)
2023–2025	Ludogorets Razgrad	12	(0)
2024	→ Amiens (loan)	14	(1)
2024–2025	→ Zürich (loan)	36	(5)
2025–	RS Berkane	10	(5)

International career^{‡}
2015	France U16	3	(0)
2016–2017	France U18	4	(1)
2017	France U19	3	(0)
2019	France U20	4	(1)
2019	France U21	1	(0)
2025	Morocco A'	2	(0)
Medal record
Men's football
Representing Morocco
FIFA Arab Cup
Winner	2025 Qatar	Team
- * Club domestic league appearances and goals as of 21:08, 14 February 2026 (CET) ‡ National team caps and goals as of 07:35, 13 December 2025 (UTC)

Mounir Chouiar (Arabic: منير شویعر; born 23 January 1999) is a professional footballer who plays for Botola Pro club RS Berkane. Mainly a left winger, he is known for his crossing ability. Born in France, he plays for the Morocco A' national team.

== Club career ==
Chouiar made his debut at professional level for Lens in a 0–0 Ligue 2 tie with Niort on 29 July 2016.

On 8 July 2022, Chouiar transferred to İstanbul Başakşehir in Turkey. On 28 January 2023, he was loaned to Kasımpaşa.

On 5 September 2023, Chouiar signed for Bulgarian First League Champions Ludogorets Razgrad. In January 2024, he joined Ligue 2 club Amiens on loan for the remainder of the season.

In 2025, Chouiar joined RS Berkane. He was nominated for the African Inter-Club Player of the Year Award in 2026.

== International career ==
Chouiar was born in France to a Mauritanian father and Moroccan mother. He is a former youth international for France. On 2 December 2025, his request to switch international allegiance to Morocco for the 2025 FIFA Arab Cup was approved by FIFA.

== Career statistics ==
As of match played on 28 November 2025

Appearances and goals by club, season and competition
Club	Season	League			National cup (Note: Includes Coupe de France, Turkish Cup, Bulgarian Cup, Swiss Cup)		League cup (Note: Includes Coupe de la Ligue)		Other		Total	
Club	Season	Division	Apps	Goals	Apps	Goals	Apps	Goals	Apps	Goals	Apps	Goals
Lens B	2015–16	Championnat de France Amateur	2	2	—		—		—		2	2
Lens B	2016–17	Championnat de France Amateur	17	1	—		—		—		17	1
Lens B	2017–18	Championnat National 2	22	3	—		—		—		22	3
Lens B	2018–19	Championnat National 2	5	5	—		—		—		5	5
Lens B	Total		46	11	0	0	0	0	0	0	46	11
Lens	2016–17	Ligue 2	1	0	2	0	0	0	—		3	0
Lens	2017–18	Ligue 2	8	0	1	0	1	0	—		10	0
Lens	2018–19	Ligue 2	25	3	3	2	2	0	3 (Note: Appearances in Ligue 2 promotion play-offs)	0	33	5
Lens	2019–20	Ligue 2	4	2	0	0	0	0	—		4	2
Lens	Total		38	5	6	2	3	0	3	0	50	7
Dijon	2019–20	Ligue 1	20	4	3	2	1	0	—		24	6
Dijon	2020–21	Ligue 1	23	0	1	0	0	0	—		24	0
Dijon	Total		43	4	4	2	1	0	0	0	48	6
Yeni Malatyaspor (loan)	2021–22	Süper Lig	26	3	1	1	—		—		27	4
İstanbul Başakşehir	2022–23	Süper Lig	16	1	2	0	—		12 (Note: Appearances in UEFA Conference League)	1	30	2
Kasımpaşa (loan)	2022–23	Süper Lig	16	2	0	0	—		—		16	2
Ludogorets Razgrad	2023–24	First Professional Football League	7	0	1	0	—		4	0	12	0
Ludogorets Razgrad	2025–26	First Professional Football League	5	0	0	0	—		5 (Note: Four appearances in UEFA Champions League, one appearance in UEFA Europa League)	0	10	0
Ludogorets Razgrad	Total		12	0	1	0	9	0	0	0	22	0
Amiens (loan)	2023–24	Ligue 2	14	1	0	0	0	0	—		14	1
Zürich (loan)	2024–25	Swiss Super League	36	5	4	1	—		4	0	44	6
RS Berkane	2025–26	Botola Pro	6	3	0	0	—		3 (Note: Two appearances in CAF Champions League, one appearance in CAF Super Cup)	2	9	5
Career totals			253	35	18	6	14	0	31	3	306	44

== Personal life ==
Born in France, Chouiar has Moroccan and Mauritanian ancestry.

== Honours ==
RS Berkane

- Botola Pro runner-up: 2025–26
- CAF Super Cup runner-up: 2025

Morocco A'

- FIFA Arab Cup: 2025

Individual

- 532 Botola Pro Team of the Season: 2025–26
