= Christopher Rocchia =

French footballer (born 1998)

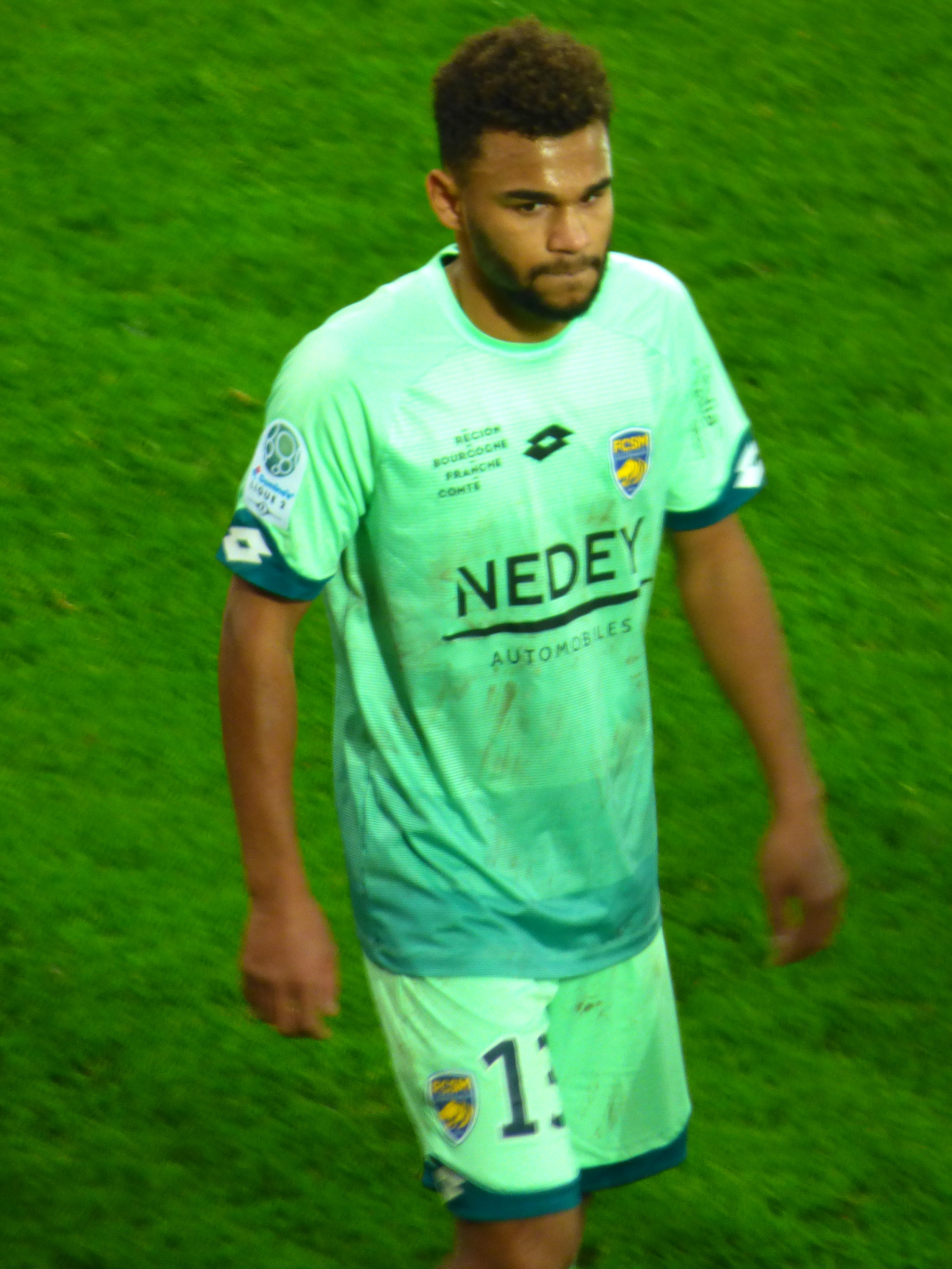
- Rocchia with Sochaux in 2019

Personal information
- Date of birth: 2 February 1998 (age 28)
- Place of birth: Marseille, France
- Height: 1.72 m (5 ft 8 in)
- Position: Left-back

Team information
- Current team: Valenciennes
- Number: 13

Youth career
- 2011–2018: Marseille

Senior career*
Years	Team	Apps	(Gls)
2016–2021	Marseille II	33	(1)
2018–2021	Marseille	3	(0)
2019–2020	→ Sochaux (loan)	30	(1)
2021–2023	Dijon	32	(0)
2024–2025	Aubagne	9	(1)
2025	Villefranche	13	(0)
2025–2026	Aubagne Air Bel	15	(0)
2026–	Valenciennes	4	(0)
- * Club domestic league appearances and goals as of 29 August 2026

Christopher Rocchia (born 1 February 1998) is a French professional footballer who plays as a left-back for Ligue 3 club Valenciennes.

== Club career ==
=== Marseille ===
Rocchia made his professional debut on 29 November 2018 in the UEFA Europa League Group Stage against Eintracht Frankfurt. He replaced Bouna Sarr after 80 minutes in a 4–0 away loss.

==== Sochaux (loan) ====
He was loaned to Sochaux in January 2019 until the end of the season. Upon his return to Marseille, he failed to establish himself in the first squad, and on 2 September 2019 he returned to Sochaux for another loan.

=== Dijon ===
On 15 June 2021, he moved to Dijon as a free agent on a two-year contract. He left the club at the end of the 2022-23 season.

=== Villefranche ===
On 7 January 2025, Rocchia signed with Villefranche.

== Personal life ==
Born in France, Rocchia is of Comorian and Malagasy descent.

== Career statistics ==
=== Club ===
As of match played 23 May 2021

Appearances and goals by club, season and competition
Club	Season	League			National Cup^{1}		League Cup		Continental^{2}		Other		Total	
Club	Season	Division	Apps	Goals	Apps	Goals	Apps	Goals	Apps	Goals	Apps	Goals	Apps	Goals
Marseille B	2016–17	National 2	8	0	—								8	0
Marseille B	2017–18	National 2	12	0	—								12	0
Marseille B	2018–19	National 2	8	1	—								8	1
Marseille B	2019–20	National 2	2	0	—								2	0
Marseille B	Total		30	1	—								30	1
Marseille	2018–19	Ligue 1	1	0	0	0	0	0	1	0	—		2	0
Marseille	2020–21	Ligue 1	2	0	1	0	—		0	0	0	0	3	0
Marseille	Total		3	0	1	0	0	0	1	0	0	0	5	0
Sochaux (loan)	2018–19	Ligue 2	8	0	0	0	0	0	—		—		8	0
Sochaux (loan)	2019–20	Ligue 2	22	1	0	0	0	0	—		—		22	1
Sochaux (loan)	Total		30	1	0	0	0	0	1	0	0	0	30	1
Career total			63	2	1	0	0	0	1	0	0	0	65	2

^{1}Includes Coupe de France.

^{2}Includes UEFA Europa League.
