= Stéphane Mangione =

French footballer and coach (born 1979)

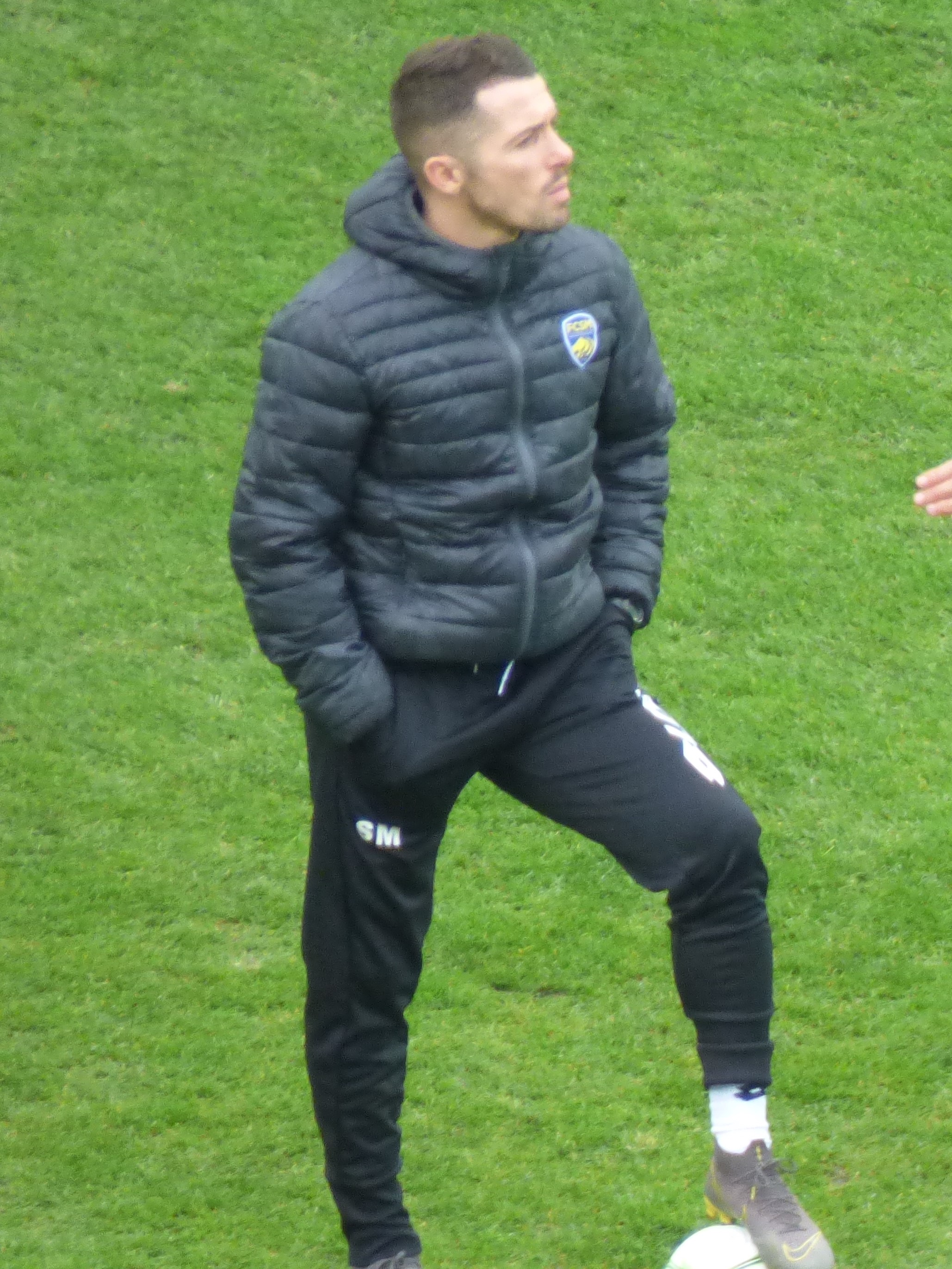
- Mangione as a coach of Sochaux in 2019

Personal information
- Date of birth: 25 December 1979 (age 46)
- Place of birth: Chenôve, France
- Height: 1.69 m (5 ft 7 in)
- Position: Left winger

Team information
- Current team: Nantes (assistant manager)

Senior career*
Years	Team	Apps	(Gls)
1999–2009	Dijon	251	(45)
2003–2004	→ Nîmes Olympique (loan)	35	(10)
2010–2011	Amiens	25	(4)
2011–2013	Orléans	51	(2)
2013–2017	Selongey	58	(17)

Managerial career
- 2017–2019: Selongey (assistant)
- 2019–2022: Sochaux (assistant)
- 2022–2023: Dijon (assistant)
- 2024: Valenciennes (assistant)
- 2024: Valenciennes (caretaker)
- 2025: Sochaux (assistant)
- 2025–: Nantes (assistant)
- * Club domestic league appearances and goals

Stéphane Mangione (born 25 December 1979) is a French football coach and a former player who played as a left winger. He is the assistant manager of Nantes.

== Playing career ==
Mangione has long been a servant of hometown club Dijon FC in fourth, then third and finally second tier of French football. He spent a decade at the club with the exception of the 2003–04 season, when he was on loan at Nîmes Olympique. On 10 November 2009, Mangione signed with Amiens SC in third tier on a free transfer, where he played for two seasons.

He then had a two years stint at US Orléans in third tier and finally three seasons at Selongey in fifth tier of French football where he finally took a position of assistant manager.

== Coaching career ==
In January 2019 he was hired as an assistant coach at Sochaux.

On 26 November 2024, Mangione was appointed caretaker manager by Championnat National club Valenciennes after the dismissal of Ahmed Kantari, whom Mangione was assisting before that.

== Honours ==
Dijon FCO

- Champion at Championnat de France amateur: 1999
- Champion at Championnat National: 2000
