= Aurélien Scheidler =

French footballer (born 1998)

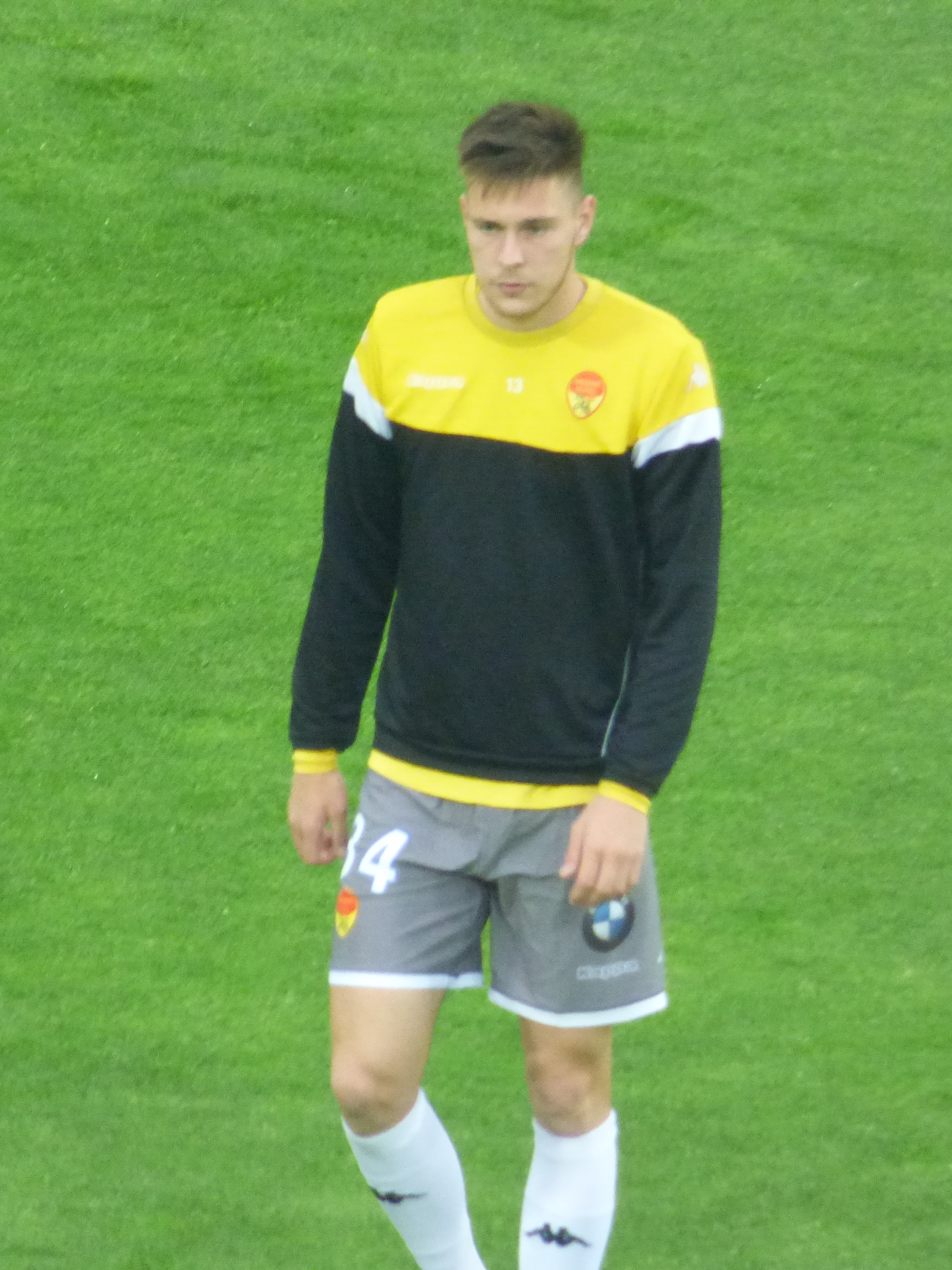
- Scheidler in 2019

Personal information
- Date of birth: 4 June 1998 (age 28)
- Place of birth: Saint-Martin-Boulogne, France
- Height: 1.92 m (6 ft 4 in)
- Position: Forward

Team information
- Current team: Charleroi
- Number: 21

Youth career
- Boulogne

Senior career*
Years	Team	Apps	(Gls)
2015–2018	Boulogne II	34	(11)
2016–2017	→ Amiens II (loan)	3	(1)
2017–2018	Boulogne	11	(2)
2018–2019	Orléans II	22	(15)
2019–2020	Orléans	28	(9)
2020–2022	Dijon	48	(13)
2021	→ Nancy (loan)	16	(4)
2022	Dijon II	1	(1)
2022–2025	Bari	22	(3)
2023–2024	→ Andorra (loan)	32	(5)
2024–2025	→ Dender EH (loan)	31	(9)
2025	Dender EH	4	(0)
2025–	Charleroi	36	(9)
- * Club domestic league appearances and goals as of 1 June 2026

Aurélien Scheidler (born 4 June 1998) is a French professional footballer who plays as a forward for Belgian Pro League club Charleroi.

== Career ==
On 13 April 2019, Scheidler signed his first professional contract with Orléans. He made his professional debut with the club in a 1–0 Ligue 2 loss to Chambly on 2 August 2019.

On 1 September 2022, Scheidler signed in Italy for Serie B club Bari. On 1 September 2023, Scheidler moved to Andorra in the Spanish second-tier Segunda División on loan with an option to buy. On 5 August 2024, Sheidler moved on a new loan to Dender EH in Belgium. After the 2024–25 season, Dender EH exercised the buy-option and Scheidler making the transfer permanent.

On 19 August 2025, Scheidler signed a three-season contract with Charleroi.
