= Ahmad Ngouyamsa =

Chadian footballer (born 2000)

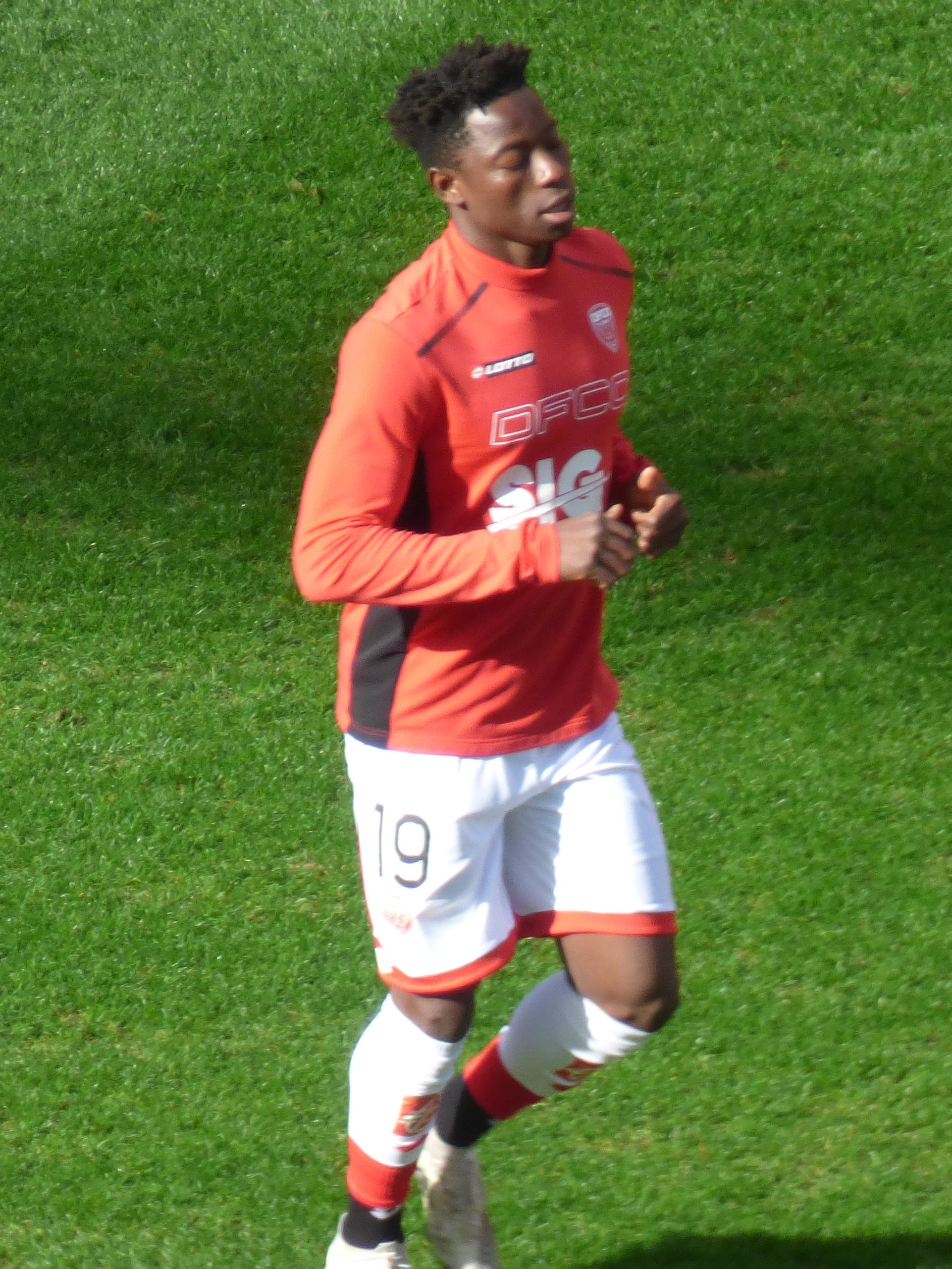
- Ngouyamsa in February 2021

Personal information
- Full name: Ahmad Toure Ngouyamsa Nounchil
- Date of birth: 21 December 2000 (age 25)
- Place of birth: Yaoundé, Cameroon
- Height: 1.76 m (5 ft 9 in)
- Position: Defender

Team information
- Current team: Créteil
- Number: 2

Senior career*
Years	Team	Apps	(Gls)
2019–2023	Dijon II	25	(0)
2020–2023	Dijon	42	(0)
2023–2025	Rodez	51	(0)
2025–	Créteil	6	(0)

International career^{‡}
2017	Cameroon U17	3	(0)
2020	Cameroon	1	(0)
2024–	Chad	6	(0)
- * Club domestic league appearances and goals as of 13 February 2026 ‡ National team caps and goals as of 7 June 2025

Ahmad Toure Ngouyamsa Nounchil (born 21 December 2000) is a professional footballer who plays as a defender for French Championnat National 1 club Créteil. Born in Cameroon, he represented it internationally before switching allegiance to Chad.

== Club career ==
Ngouyamsa made his professional debut with Dijon in a 1-0 Ligue 1 win over Lille OSC on 12 January 2020.

On 30 June 2023, Ngouyamsa signed a two-year contract with Rodez.

== International career ==
Ngouyamsa represented the Cameroon U17s at the 2017 Africa U-17 Cup of Nations. Ngouyamsa made his debut with the Cameroon national team in a friendly 0–0 tie with Japan on 9 October 2020.

In 2024, Ngouyamsa switched to Chad national team and debuted on 6 September 2024 in an Africa Cup of Nations qualifier against Sierra Leone.
