= David Linarès =

French footballer (born 1975)

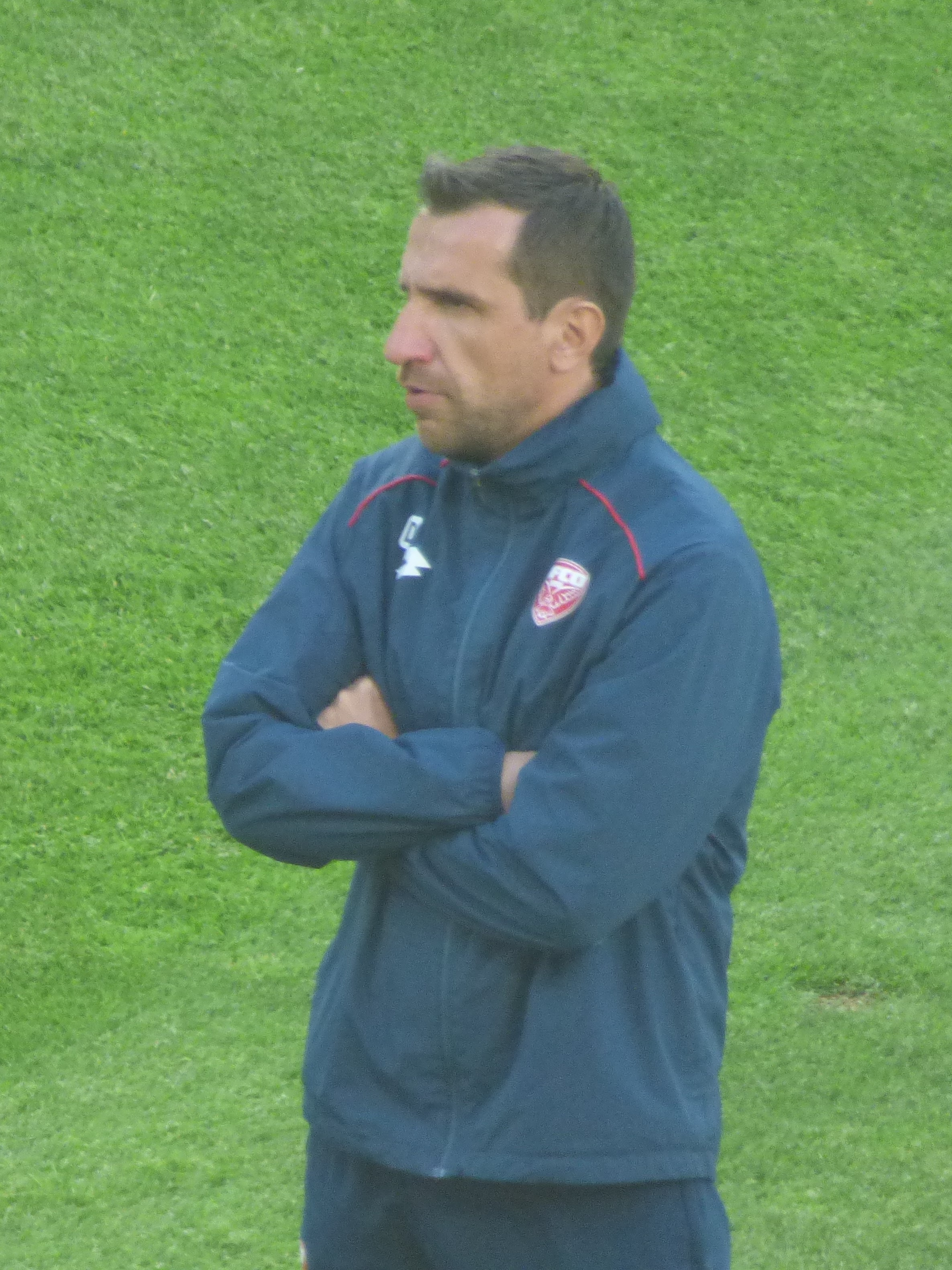
- Linarès in 2019

Personal information
- Date of birth: 5 October 1975 (age 51)
- Place of birth: Lons-le-Saunier, France
- Height: 1.81 m (5 ft 11 in)
- Position: Midfielder

Senior career*
| Years | Team | Apps | (Gls) |
| 1996–2002 | Lyon | 149 | (3) |
| 2002–2004 | Troyes | 56 | (0) |
| 2004 | Tenerife | 1 | (0) |
| 2005–2010 | Dijon | 158 | (6) |
| Total | | 364 | (9) |

Managerial career
- 2020–2021: Dijon
- * Club domestic league appearances and goals

David Linarès (born 5 October 1975) is a French football coach and former player. (Note: David Linarès – French league stats at LFP – also available in French (archived))

== Playing career ==
A midfielder, Linarès made his professional debut on 17 November 1996 against Lille. He won the French championship during the 2001–02 season while playing for Lyon.

== Coaching career ==
Dijon hired him as manager in November 2020, with the club in last place in Ligue 1. Despite being unable to avoid relegation or even improve the table position, he remained the manager for the 2021–22 season. After only gaining one point in the first five games of the 2021–22 Ligue 2 season, he was dismissed by the club on 23 August 2021.

== Managerial statistics ==
As of match played 11 September 2021

Managerial record by team and tenure
| Team | From | To | Record | | | | | | | |
| Team | From | To | G | W | D | L | GF | GA | GD | Win % |
|---|---|---|---|---|---|---|---|---|---|---|
| Dijon | 6 November 2020 | Present | 38 | 6 | 7 | 25 | 32 | 72 | −40 | 15.79 |
| Total | | | 38 | 6 | 7 | 25 | 32 | 72 | −40 | 15.79 |

== Personal life ==
Born in France, Linarès is of Spanish descent.

== Honours ==
- Ligue 1: 2001–02
- UEFA Intertoto Cup: 1997
