= Stade Gaston Gérard =

Multi-use stadium in Dijon, France

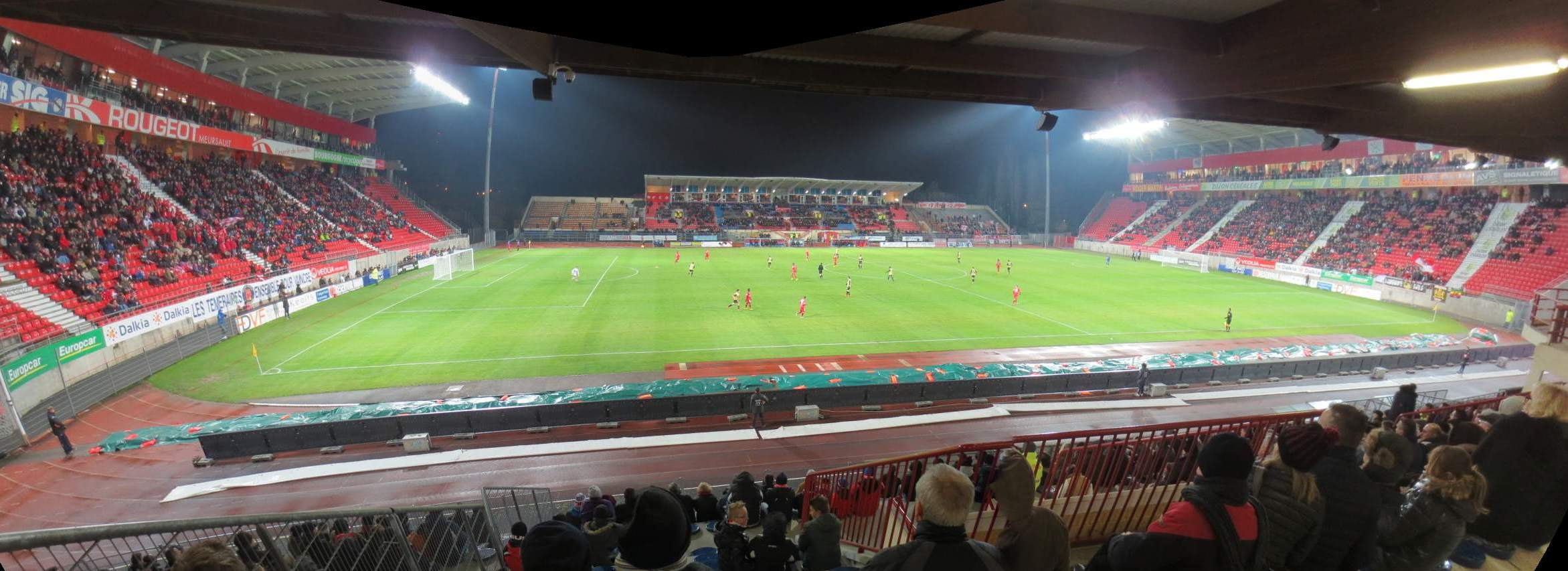
- Interactive map of Stade Gaston Gérard
- Full name: Parc des Sports Gaston-Gérard (sports complex), Stade Gaston-Gérard (stadium)
- Address: Place Gaston-Gérard, 21000 Dijon; Dijon; France
- Coordinates: 47°19′28″N 5°04′06″E
- Owner: Ville de Dijon
- Capacity: 15,459
- Surface: grass

Construction
- Built: 1934
- Opened: 21 May 1934
- Renovated: 2016-17

Tenant
- Dijon FCO

Stade Gaston Gérard (French pronunciation: [stad gastɔ̃ ʒeʁaʁ]) is a multi-use stadium in Dijon, France. It is used mostly for football matches and is the home stadium of Dijon FCO. The stadium is able to hold 15,459 people.

A stadium renovation began in 2016, intended to increase the capacity to 20,000 seats. Completion of the renovation is expected in the summer of 2017. The architect for the project is Jean Guervilly and the overall cost is 19 million euros.
