= 2020–21 Stade de Reims season =

Stade de Reims
2020–21 season
- President: Jean-Pierre Caillot
- Head coach: David Guion
- Stadium: Stade Auguste-Delaune
- Ligue 1: 14th
- Coupe de France: Round of 64
- UEFA Europa League: Third qualifying round
- Top goalscorer: League: Boulaye Dia (14); All: Boulaye Dia (16)
- Biggest win: Montpellier 0–4 Reims
- Biggest defeat: Lyon 3–0 Reims
Home colours	Away colours	Third colours
- All statistics correct as of 23 May 2021.

Fourth kit, used vs Monaco (23 August)

The 2020–21 season was the 89th season in the existence of Stade de Reims and the club's third consecutive season in the top flight of French football. In addition to the domestic league, Reims participated in this season's edition of the Coupe de France and the UEFA Europa League. This was the Reims' first season since 1962–63 in the European football. The season covered the period from 1 July 2020 to 30 June 2021.

== Players ==
=== First-team squad ===
As of 1 February 2021.

Note: Flags indicate national team as defined under FIFA eligibility rules; some limited exceptions apply. Players may hold more than one non-FIFA nationality.

No.	Pos.	Nation	Player
1	GK	SRB	Predrag Rajković
2	DF	BEL	Wout Faes
3	DF	CIV	Ghislain Konan
5	DF	MAR	Yunis Abdelhamid (captain)
7	MF	FRA	Xavier Chavalerin
8	MF	SUI	Dereck Kutesa
9	FW	NED	Kaj Sierhuis
10	MF	KOS	Arbër Zeneli
11	FW	SEN	Boulaye Dia
14	MF	KOS	Valon Berisha
15	MF	ZIM	Marshall Munetsi

No.	Pos.	Nation	Player
16	GK	FRA	Yehvann Diouf
21	FW	FRA	Nathanaël Mbuku
23	MF	GBS	Moreto Cassamá
24	MF	FRA	Mathieu Cafaro
25	MF	MLI	Moussa Doumbia
27	FW	MLI	El Bilal Touré
28	DF	BEL	Thibault De Smet
29	DF	AUT	Dario Maresic
30	GK	SEN	Dialy N'Diaye
32	DF	BEL	Thomas Foket

=== Out on loan ===
Note: Flags indicate national team as defined under FIFA eligibility rules; some limited exceptions apply. Players may hold more than one non-FIFA nationality.

No.	Pos.	Nation	Player
—	GK	FRA	Nicolas Lemaître (on loan at Quevilly-Rouen)
—	DF	FRA	Logan Costa (on loan at Le Mans)
—	MF	FRA	Ilan Kebbal (on loan at Dunkerque)
—	MF	FRA	Sambou Sissoko (on loan at Quevilly-Rouen)
—	FW	FRA	Billal Brahimi (on loan at Le Mans)

No.	Pos.	Nation	Player
—	FW	SCO	Fraser Hornby (on loan at Aberdeen)
—	FW	FRA	Timothé Nkada (on loan at AaB)
—	FW	FRA	Hugo Ekitike (on loan at Vejle BK)
—	FW	GRE	Tasos Donis (on loan at VVV-Venlo)

=== Reserve team ===
As of 1 February 2021

Note: Flags indicate national team as defined under FIFA eligibility rules; some limited exceptions apply. Players may hold more than one non-FIFA nationality.

No.	Pos.	Nation	Player
—	GK	FRA	Trey Vimalin
—	GK	FRA	Louis Pelletier
—	GK	FRA	Yannis Laib
—	DF	FRA	Redouane Tbahriti
—	DF	FRA	Enzo Valentim
—	DF	FRA	Antar Yalaoui
—	DF	FRA	Bradley Locko
—	DF	SEN	Moustapha Mbow

No.	Pos.	Nation	Player
—	DF	MLI	Fodé Doucouré
—	MF	CMR	Christian Rosin Bella
—	MF	FRA	Mouhamadou Drammeh
—	MF	FRA	Fahem Benaissa
—	MF	FRA	Hamza Khida
—	MF	FRA	Nabil Homssa
—	MF	FRA	Isaac Solet
—	MF	CMR	Moïse Sakava
—	FW	CIV	N'dri Philippe Koffi
—	FW	FRA	Maxime Penneteau

== Transfers ==
=== In ===
No.	Pos	Player	Transferred from	Fee	Date	Source
14	MF	(Kosovo) Valon Berisha	(Italy) Lazio	€5,000,000	9 July 2020	

=== Out ===
No.	Pos	Player	Transferred to	Fee	Date	Source
15			TBD		1 July 2020	

== Pre-season and friendlies ==
Win Draw Loss

9 July 2020 Friendly	Reims	3–1	Troyes	Bétheny, France
17:00 CEST (UTC+2)	Zeneli 12'; Touré 43'; Hornby 60'	Report	Camara 75'	Stadium: Stade Louis Blériot N°1

15 July 2020 Friendly	Reims	Cancelled	Royal Excel Mouscron	Le Touquet, France
17:00 CEST (UTC+2)				Stadium: Stade Ferdi Petit

15 July 2020 Friendly	Reims	3–0	Rouen	Le Touquet, France
17:00 CEST (UTC+2)	Dia 25' (pen.); Banor 34' (o.g.); Zeneli 80' (pen.)	Report		Stadium: Stade Ferdi Petit
Note: Match was played in three 30-minute periods.

18 July 2020 Friendly	Reims	2–2	Dunkerque	Le Touquet, France
18:00 CEST (UTC+2)	Sierhuis 11' (pen.); Zeneli 90' (pen.)	Report	Bosca 55'; Bruneel 68'	Stadium: Stade Ferdi Petit

22 July 2020 Friendly	Reims	3–0	Le Havre	Le Touquet, France
17:00 CEST (UTC+2)	Sierhuis 18'; Touré 44'; Zeneli 46' (pen.)	Report		Stadium: Stade Ferdi Petit

1 August 2020 Friendly	Standard Liège	1–0	Reims	Liège, Belgium
15:00 CEST (UTC+2)	Carcela 65'	Report		Stadium: Stade Maurice Dufrasne; Attendance: 0

1 August 2020 Friendly	Standard Liège	3–0	Reims	Seraing, Belgium
17:30 CEST (UTC+2)	Shamir 20'; Balikwisha 45'; Čop 59'	Report		Stadium: Académie Robert Louis-Dreyfus; Attendance: 0

5 August 2020 Friendly	Maribor	0–2	Reims	Feldbach, Austria
18:00 CEST (UTC+2)		Report	Zeneli 30', 32'	Stadium: Sparkassenstadion; Attendance: 0

8 August 2020 Friendly	Reims	Cancelled	Strasbourg	Reims, France
18:00 CEST (UTC+2)				Stadium: Stade Auguste-Delaune

8 August 2020 Friendly	Reims	0–4	Bordeaux	Reims, France
18:00 CEST (UTC+2)		Report	Oudin 28'; De Préville 30'; Zerkane 41'; Briand 67'	Stadium: Stade Auguste-Delaune; Attendance: 2,189

15 August 2020 Friendly	Reims	3–1	Midtjylland	Reims, France
18:00 CEST (UTC+2)	Foket (yellow card) 58'; Munetsi 69'; Kutesa 72'; Faes (yellow card) 73'; Touré 90+1'	Report	Mabil 15'	Stadium: Stade Auguste-Delaune

== Competitions ==
=== Overview ===
Competition	First match	Last match	Starting round	Final position	Record							
Competition	First match	Last match	Starting round	Final position	Pld	W	D	L	GF	GA	GD	Win %
Ligue 1	23 August 2020	23 May 2021	Matchday 1	14th	38	9	15	14	42	50	−8	23.68
Coupe de France	9 February 2021		Round of 64	Round of 64	1	0	0	1	3	4	−1	0.00
UEFA Europa League	17 September 2020	24 September 2020	Second qualifying round	Third qualifying round	2	1	1	0	1	0	+1	50.00
Total					41	10	16	15	46	54	−8	24.39

Last updated: 23 May 2021
Source: Soccerway

=== Ligue 1 ===
==== League table ====
Pos	Team	Pld	W	D	L	GF	GA	GD	Pts
12	Bordeaux	38	13	6	19	42	56	−14	45
13	Angers	38	12	8	18	40	58	−18	44
14	Reims	38	9	15	14	42	50	−8	42
15	Strasbourg	38	11	9	18	49	58	−9	42
16	Lorient	38	11	9	18	50	68	−18	42

Source: Ligue 1
Rules for classification: 1) Points; 2) Goal difference; 3) Goals scored; 4) Head-to-head goal difference; 5) Fairplay ranking.

==== Results summary ====
Overall								Home						Away					
Pld	W	D	L	GF	GA	GD	Pts	W	D	L	GF	GA	GD	W	D	L	GF	GA	GD
38	9	15	14	42	50	−8	42	4	8	7	16	21	−5	5	7	7	26	29	−3

Last updated: 23 May 2021.
Source: Ligue 1

==== Results by round ====
Round	1	2	3	4	5	6	7	8	9	10	11	12	13	14	15	16	17	18	19	20	21	22	23	24	25	26	27	28	29	30	31	32	33	34	35	36	37	38
Ground	A	H	A	A	H	A	H	A	H	A	H	A	H	A	H	A	A	H	H	A	H	A	H	A	H	A	H	A	H	A	H	A	H	H	A	H	A	H
Result	D	L	L	L	L	D	L	W	W	D	L	L	D	L	W	D	W	D	W	L	W	W	D	L	D	D	D	W	D	W	D	D	D	L	D	L	L	L
Position	5	14	17	19	19	19	19	19	15	16	17	17	18	19	17	17	15	15	14	15	14	12	12	14	13	13	13	12	13	12	12	12	11	11	11	13	13	14

Source: Ligue 1
A = Away; H = Home; W = Win; D = Draw; L = Loss

==== Matches ====
The league fixtures were announced on 9 July 2020.

23 August 2020 1	Monaco	2–2	Reims	Monaco
13:00 CEST (UTC+2)	Disasi 45+2', (yellow card) 90'; Badiashile 55'	Report	Dia 5'; Touré 21'; Kutesa (yellow card) 41'; Faes (yellow card) 76'; Foket (yellow card) 90'	Stadium: Stade Louis II; Attendance: 5,000; Referee: François Letexier

30 August 2020 2	Reims	0–1	Lille	Reims
13:00 CEST (UTC+2)	Faes (yellow card) 75'; Hornby (yellow card) 80'; Chavalerin (yellow card) 81'; Rajković (yellow card) 90'	Report	Bamba 32'; Çelik (yellow card) 34'	Stadium: Stade Auguste-Delaune; Referee: Stéphanie Frappart

13 September 2020 3	Angers	1–0	Reims	Angers
15:00 CEST (UTC+2)	Bahoken (yellow card) 19', (penalty missed) 44', 55'; Thomas (yellow card) 52' (yellow-red card) 61'; Fulgini (yellow card) 90+1'	Report	Faes (red card) 42'; Touré (yellow card) 49'; Munetsi (yellow card) 86'	Stadium: Stade Raymond Kopa; Referee: Benoît Bastien

20 September 2020 4	Metz	2–1	Reims	Metz
15:00 CEST (UTC+2)	Niane 18', 88'; Boulaya (yellow card) 43'	Report	Abdelhamid (yellow card) 17'; Cassamá (yellow card) 27'; Dia 43' (pen.); Konan (yellow card) 48'; Munetsi (red card) 50'; Cafaro (yellow card) 53'	Stadium: Stade Saint-Symphorien; Referee: Johan Hamel

27 September 2020 5	Reims	0–2	Paris Saint-Germain	Reims
21:00 CEST (UTC+2)	Cassamá (yellow card) 35'; Foket (yellow card) 74'	Report	Icardi 9', 63'; Draxler (yellow card) 52'; Marquinhos (yellow card) 90+2'	Stadium: Stade Auguste-Delaune; Referee: Ruddy Buquet

4 October 2020 6	Rennes	2–2	Reims	Rennes
17:00 CEST (UTC+2)	Raphinha 24'; Da Silva (yellow card) 35', (goal) 37'; Tait (yellow card) 38'; Camavinga (yellow card) 54'; Aguerd (yellow card) 90+3'	Report	Abdelhamid 11'; Faes (yellow card) 40'; Chavalerin (yellow card) 57'; Dia 66'; Munetsi (yellow card) 71'	Stadium: Roazhon Park; Referee: Florent Batta

17 October 2020 7	Reims	1–3	Lorient	Reims
17:00 CEST (UTC+2)	Cassamá 15', (red card) 70'; Chavalerin (yellow card) 19'; Ekitike (yellow card) 45+1'; Drammeh (yellow card) 48'; Faes (yellow card) 54'; Donis (red card) 90'	Report	Hamel (yellow card) 34', (goal) 61'; Wissa 64' (pen.); Moffi 80'	Stadium: Stade Auguste-Delaune; Referee: Mikael Lesage

25 October 2020 8	Montpellier	0–4	Reims	Montpellier
15:00 CET (UTC+1)	Hilton (red card) 7'; Le Tallec (red card) 42'; Oyongo (yellow card) 55'	Report	Dia 9' (pen.), 13', 56' (pen.); Mbuku 31'	Stadium: Stade de la Mosson; Referee: Willy Delajod

1 November 2020 9	Reims	2–1	Strasbourg	Reims
15:00 CET (UTC+1)	Kamara 22' (o.g.); Faes 26'	Report	Diallo (yellow card) 3'; Ajorque 30' (pen.); Prcić (yellow card) 73'	Stadium: Stade Auguste-Delaune; Attendance: 0 Referee: Eric Wattellier

8 November 2020 10	Lens	4–4	Reims	Lens
15:00 CET (UTC+1)	Medina (yellow card) 14'; Mauricio (yellow card) 18'; Banza 21'; Badé (yellow card) 76'; Foket 77' (o.g.); Sotoca 90', 90+1'	Report	Faes (yellow card) 46'; Cafaro 47'; Dia 54', 81'; Medina 79' (o.g.)	Stadium: Stade Bollaert-Delelis; Attendance: 0 Referee: Thomas Léonard

22 November 2020 11	Reims	0–1	Nîmes	Reims
15:00 CET (UTC+1)	Sierhuis (yellow card) 19'; Munetsi (yellow card) 47'; Berisha (yellow card) 82'	Report	Ripart (yellow card) 34', (goal) 62' (pen.)	Stadium: Stade Auguste-Delaune; Attendance: 0 Referee: Jérémy Stinat

29 November 2020 12	Lyon	3–0	Reims	Décines-Charpieu
13:00 CET (UTC+1)	Toko Ekambi 22'; Bruno Guimarães 49'; Cornet (yellow card) 62'; Dembélé 66', (yellow card) 82'	Report	Touré (yellow card) 14'; Cassamá (red card) 32'	Stadium: Parc Olympique Lyonnais; Attendance: 0 Referee: Jérôme Miguelgorry

6 December 2020 13	Reims	0–0	Nice	Reims
17:00 CET (UTC+1)	Dia (yellow card) 59'	Report	Boudaoui (yellow card) 16'; Danilo (yellow card) 85'	Stadium: Stade Auguste-Delaune; Attendance: 0 Referee: Stéphanie Frappart

13 December 2020 14	Brest	2–1	Reims	Brest
15:00 CET (UTC+1)	Honorat 30'; Mounié (penalty missed) 36', 77'; Hérelle (yellow card) 50'	Report	Munetsi (yellow card) 51'; Zeneli 65'	Stadium: Stade Francis-Le Blé; Attendance: 0 Referee: Aurélien Petit

16 December 2020 15	Reims	3–2	Nantes	Reims
19:00 CET (UTC+1)	Konan (yellow card) 7'; Cassamá (yellow card) 58'; Touré 68'; Dia 72' (pen.); Cafaro 74'	Report	Fábio (yellow card) 5'; Pallois 18'; Traoré (yellow card) 72'; Blas 79'	Stadium: Stade Auguste-Delaune; Attendance: 0 Referee: Karim Abed

19 December 2020 16	Marseille	1–1	Reims	Marseille
19:00 CET (UTC+1)	Nagatomo (yellow card) 25'; Thauvin 45'	Report	De Smet (yellow card) 19'; Nagatomo 21' (o.g.); Touré (yellow card) 78'; Cassamá (yellow card) 90+2'	Stadium: Stade Vélodrome; Attendance: 0 Referee: Thomas Léonard

23 December 2020 17	Bordeaux	1–3	Reims	Bordeaux
19:00 CET (UTC+1)	Benito (yellow card) 41'; Bašić (yellow card) 66'; Hwang 73'; Adli (yellow card) 78'	Report	Abdelhamid 15'; Dia 18'; Berisha (yellow card) 78'; Munetsi 89'	Stadium: Matmut Atlantique; Attendance: 0 Referee: Jérôme Brisard

6 January 2021 18	Reims	0–0	Dijon	Reims
21:00 CET (UTC+1)	Foket (yellow card) 59'; Chavalerin (yellow card) 74'	Report	Diop (yellow card) 25'; Celina (yellow card) 42'; Sammaritano (yellow card) 79'	Stadium: Stade Auguste-Delaune; Attendance: 0 Referee: Amaury Delerue

9 January 2021 19	Reims	3–1	Saint-Étienne	Reims
21:00 CET (UTC+1)	Dia 12' (pen.), 37'; Cassamá (yellow card) 14'; Mbuku (yellow card) 32'; Cafaro 59'	Report	Boudebouz (yellow card) 11'; Nordin (yellow card) 43'; Moulin (yellow card) 58'; Bouanga (yellow card) 69'; Abi 72'	Stadium: Stade Auguste-Delaune; Attendance: 0 Referee: Florent Batta

17 January 2021 20	Lille	2–1	Reims	Villeneuve-d'Ascq
17:00 CET (UTC+1)	Bamba 48'; Djaló (yellow card) 85'; David 90+1'; Luiz Araújo (yellow card) 90+4'	Report	Cassamá (yellow card) 31'; Zeneli 36'	Stadium: Stade Pierre-Mauroy; Attendance: 0 Referee: Benoît Millot

24 January 2021 21	Reims	1–0	Brest	Reims
15:00 CET (UTC+1)	Mbuku 40'; Cafaro (yellow card) 70'; Faes (yellow card) 76'; Abdelhamid (yellow card) 83'	Report		Stadium: Stade Auguste-Delaune; Attendance: 0 Referee: Johan Hamel

31 January 2021 22	Strasbourg	0–1	Reims	Strasbourg
15:00 CET (UTC+1)	Djiku (yellow card) 64'	Report	Faes (yellow card) 38'; Kutesa 80'; Chavalerin (yellow card) 85'	Stadium: Stade de la Meinau; Attendance: 0 Referee: Stéphanie Frappart

3 February 2021 23	Reims	0–0	Angers	Reims
19:00 CET (UTC+1)	Cassamá (yellow card) 24'; Faes (yellow card) 75'	Report	Bamba (yellow card) 20'	Stadium: Stade Auguste-Delaune; Attendance: 0 Referee: Aurélien Petit

6 February 2021 24	Lorient	1–0	Reims	Lorient
17:00 CET (UTC+1)	Abergel 53'	Report	Kutesa (yellow card) 27'; Mbuku (yellow card) 74'; De Smet (yellow card) 87'; Chavalerin (yellow card) 90+5'	Stadium: Stade du Moustoir; Attendance: 0 Referee: Thomas Léonard

13 February 2021 25	Reims	1–1	Lens	Reims
19:00 CET (UTC+1)	Zeneli 13'; Konan (yellow card) 43'; Faes (yellow card) 48'	Report	Kakuta (penalty missed) 45'; Sotoca 61'	Stadium: Stade Auguste-Delaune; Attendance: 0 Referee: Eric Wattellier

20 February 2021 26	Saint-Étienne	1–1	Reims	Saint-Étienne
13:00 CET (UTC+1)	Abi 89'	Report	Touré 72'; Mbuku (yellow card) 79'; Doumbia (yellow card) 89'	Stadium: Stade Geoffroy-Guichard; Attendance: 0 Referee: Antony Gautier

28 February 2021 27	Reims	0–0	Montpellier	Reims
15:00 CET (UTC+1)	Dia (yellow card) 81'	Report	Hilton (yellow card) 64'	Stadium: Stade Auguste-Delaune; Attendance: 0 Referee: François Letexier

3 March 2021 28	Nantes	1–2	Reims	Nantes
21:00 CET (UTC+1)	Simon 14'	Report	Faes (yellow card) 6'; Konan (yellow card) 11', (goal) 39'; Cassamá (yellow card) 29'; Chavalerin (yellow card) 69'; Abdelhamid (yellow card) 80', (goal) 89'	Stadium: Stade de la Beaujoire; Attendance: 0 Referee: Willy Delajod

12 March 2021 29	Reims	1–1	Lyon	Reims
21:00 CET (UTC+1)	Cafaro 33', (yellow card) 43'; Abdelhamid (yellow card) 61'; Munetsi (yellow card) 68'	Report	Depay (yellow card) 30'; Kadewere 90+2'	Stadium: Stade Auguste-Delaune; Attendance: 0 Referee: Jérôme Brisard

21 March 2021 30	Dijon	0–1	Reims	Dijon
15:00 CET (UTC+1)	Baldé (yellow card) 59'; Ndong (yellow card) 78'; Lautoa (yellow card) 87'	Report	Dia 50'	Stadium: Stade Gaston Gérard; Attendance: 0 Referee: Benoît Bastien

4 April 2021 31	Reims	2–2	Rennes	Reims
15:00 CEST (UTC+2)	Chavalerin (yellow card) 39'; Dia 60'; Faes (yellow card) 74'; Konan 81'; Rajković (yellow card) 84'; Cassamá (red card) 85'	Report	Bourigeaud (yellow card) 39'; Terrier (yellow card) 67'; Guirassy 75' (pen.), 83'; Nzonzi (yellow card) 76'	Stadium: Stade Auguste-Delaune; Attendance: 0 Referee: Karim Abed

11 April 2021 32	Nice	0–0	Reims	Nice
15:00 CEST (UTC+2)		Report	Touré (yellow card) 88'	Stadium: Allianz Riviera; Attendance: 0 Referee: Jérémy Stinat

18 April 2021 33	Reims	0–0	Metz	Reims
15:00 CEST (UTC+2)	Munetsi (yellow card) 18'; Konan (yellow card) 53'; Foket (yellow card) 65'	Report	Kouyaté (yellow card) 81'	Stadium: Stade Auguste-Delaune; Attendance: 0 Referee: Jérôme Miguelgorry

23 April 2021 34	Reims	1–3	Marseille	Reims
21:00 CEST (UTC+2)	Faes (yellow card) 29' (yellow-red card) 69'; Mbuku 38'	Report	Payet 41', 76'; Milik 45+1'	Stadium: Stade Auguste-Delaune; Attendance: 0 Referee: Eric Wattellier

2 May 2021 35	Nîmes	2–2	Reims	Nîmes
15:00 CEST (UTC+2)	Paquiez (yellow card) 45'; Ripart 47'; Koné 71', (yellow card) 72'	Report	Zeneli (yellow card) 21'; Mbuku 30'; De Smet (yellow card) 56'; Flips 80'	Stadium: Stade des Costières; Attendance: 0 Referee: Benoît Millot

9 May 2021 36	Reims	0–1	Monaco	Reims
17:05 CEST (UTC+2)	Munetsi (yellow card) 31'	Report	Matazo 20'; Badiashile (yellow card) 39'; Maripán (yellow card) 89'; Golovin (yellow card) 90+3'	Stadium: Stade Auguste-Delaune; Attendance: 0 Referee: Antony Gautier

16 May 2021 37	Paris Saint-Germain	4–0	Reims	Paris
21:00 CEST (UTC+2)	Neymar 13' (pen.); Mbappé 24'; Marquinhos 68'; Kean 90'	Report	Abdelhamid (red card) 10'	Stadium: Parc des Princes; Attendance: 0 Referee: Clément Turpin

23 May 2021 38	Reims	1–2	Bordeaux	Reims
21:00 CEST (UTC+2)	Touré 15'; Sierhuis (yellow card) 90+2'	Report	Adli 44'; Kwateng 58', (yellow card) 90+2'	Stadium: Stade Auguste-Delaune; Attendance: 0 Referee: Jérôme Brisard

=== Coupe de France ===
9 February 2021 Round of 64	Reims	3–4	Valenciennes	Reims
18:30 CET (UTC+1)	Sierhuis 30'; Maresic (yellow card) 39'; Dia 84', 90'	Report	Guillaume 22', 56'; Cabral 63', 81'; D'Almeida (yellow card) 73'	Stadium: Stade Auguste Delaune; Attendance: 0 Referee: Jérémie Pignard

=== UEFA Europa League ===
17 September 2020 Second qualifying round	Servette (Switzerland)	0–1	(France) Reims	Geneva, Switzerland
20:45 CEST (UTC+2)		Report	Berisha 4'; Chavalerin (yellow card) 43'; Cassamá (yellow card) 45+1'; Faes (yellow card) 67'; Touré (yellow card) 83'	Stadium: Stade de Genève; Attendance: 0 Referee: Stuart Attwell (England)

24 September 2020 Third qualifying round	Fehérvár (Hungary)	0–0 (a.e.t.) (4–1 p)	(France) Reims	Székesfehérvár, Hungary
18:00 CEST (UTC+2)		Report	Berisha (yellow card) 8'; Chavalerin (yellow card) 45+1'; Foket (yellow card) 56' (yellow-red card) 115'	Stadium: MOL Aréna Sóstó; Attendance: 0 Referee: Matej Jug (Slovenia)
	Penalties
	Evandro (penalty scored); Stopira (penalty scored); Hodžić (penalty scored); Nego (penalty scored)		(penalty missed) Dia; (penalty missed) Abdelhamid; (penalty scored) Konan

== Statistics ==
=== Goalscorers ===
As of 29 November 2020

Rank	No.	Pos	Nat	Name	Ligue 1	Coupe de France	Europa League	Total
1	11	FW	(France)	Boulaye Dia	8	0	0	8
2	4	DF	(Belgium)	Wout Faes	1	0	0	1
2	5	DF	(Morocco)	Yunis Abdelhamid	1	0	0	1
2	14	MF	(Kosovo)	Valon Berisha	0	0	1	1
2	23	MF	(Guinea-Bissau)	Moreto Cassamá	1	0	0	1
2	24	MF	(France)	Mathieu Cafaro	1	0	0	1
2	21	FW	(France)	Nathanaël Mbuku	1	0	0	1
2	27	FW	(Mali)	El Bilal Touré	1	0	0	1
Own goals					2	0	0	2
Totals					16	0	1	17
