= 2019–20 Stade de Reims season =

Reims
2019–20 season
- President: Jean-Pierre Caillot
- Head coach: David Guion
- Stadium: Stade Auguste Delaune
- Ligue 1: 6th
- Coupe de France: Round of 64
- Coupe de la Ligue: Semi-finals
- Top goalscorer: League: Boulaye Dia (7); All: Boulaye Dia (8)
- Highest home attendance: 20,437 (vs Paris Saint-Germain, 22 January 2020)
- Lowest home attendance: 4,606 (vs Montpellier, 17 December 2019)
Home colours	Away colours	Third colours

The 2019–20 season was Reims's 76th season in existence and the club's 16th consecutive season in the top flight of French football. In addition to the domestic league, Reims participated in this season's editions of the Coupe de France, and the Coupe de la Ligue. The season covered the period from 1 July 2019 to 30 June 2020.

== Players ==
=== First-team squad ===
As of 1 February 2020

Note: Flags indicate national team as defined under FIFA eligibility rules; some limited exceptions apply. Players may hold more than one non-FIFA nationality.

No.	Pos.	Nation	Player
1	GK	SRB	Predrag Rajković
3	DF	CIV	Ghislain Konan
4	MF	TOG	Alaixys Romao (captain)
5	DF	MAR	Yunis Abdelhamid
6	DF	FRA	Axel Disasi
7	MF	FRA	Xavier Chavalerin
8	MF	SUI	Dereck Kutesa
9	FW	GRE	Anastasios Donis (on loan from VfB Stuttgart)
10	FW	NED	Kaj Sierhuis
11	FW	FRA	Boulaye Dia
13	DF	FRA	Hassane Kamara
14	MF	FRA	Sambou Sissoko
15	MF	ZIM	Marshall Munetsi

No.	Pos.	Nation	Player
16	GK	FRA	Nicolas Lemaître
17	MF	KOS	Arbër Zeneli
19	FW	FRA	Timothé Nkada
20	MF	CMR	Tristan Dingomé
23	MF	GBS	Moreto Cassamá
24	MF	FRA	Mathieu Cafaro
25	MF	MLI	Moussa Doumbia
26	MF	FRA	Nolan Mbemba
27	MF	FRA	Virgile Pinson
29	DF	AUT	Dario Maresic
30	GK	FRA	Yehvann Diouf
32	DF	BEL	Thomas Foket
34	FW	MLI	El Bilal Touré

=== Under contract ===
Note: Flags indicate national team as defined under FIFA eligibility rules; some limited exceptions apply. Players may hold more than one non-FIFA nationality.

No.	Pos.	Nation	Player
—	MF	FRA	Grégory Berthier

=== Out on loan ===
Note: Flags indicate national team as defined under FIFA eligibility rules; some limited exceptions apply. Players may hold more than one non-FIFA nationality.

No.	Pos.	Nation	Player
—	FW	FRA	Youness Aouladzian (on loan at Boulogne)
—	FW	FRA	Scott Kyei (on loan at Gazélec Ajaccio)

No.	Pos.	Nation	Player
—	DF	BEL	Wout Faes (on loan at Oostende)
—	FW	FRA	Maxime Penneteau (on loan at Bastia-Borgo)

=== Reserve team ===
As of 16 February 2019

Note: Flags indicate national team as defined under FIFA eligibility rules; some limited exceptions apply. Players may hold more than one non-FIFA nationality.

No.	Pos.	Nation	Player
—	GK	FRA	Ryan Bouallak
—	GK	FRA	Stevenn Leroux
—	DF	FRA	Lorenzo Diaz
—	DF	FRA	Lilian Faye
—	DF	FRA	Logan Costa
—	DF	FRA	Pierre Nouvel
—	DF	FRA	Lenny Vallier
—	MF	FRA	Youness Aouladzian
—	MF	FRA	Dorian Samba

No.	Pos.	Nation	Player
—	MF	FRA	Mouhamadou Drammeh
—	MF	FRA	Hamza Khida
—	MF	FRA	Maténé Diarra
—	FW	FRA	Scott Kyei
—	FW	FRA	Maxime Penneteau
—	FW	FRA	Nathanaël Mbuku

== Pre-season and friendlies ==
Win Draw Loss

13 July 2019 Friendly	Lille	1–1	Reims	Saint-Quentin, France
18:00 CEST (UTC+2)	Rémy 3'	Report	Mbemba 90'	Stadium: Stade Paul Debrésie; Attendance: 712

20 July 2019 Friendly	Reims	1–1	Gent	Le Touquet, France
18:00 CEST (UTC+2)	Oudin 75'	Report	Sylla 52'	Stadium: Stade Gérard Houllier

24 July 2019 Friendly	Reims	2–0	Metz	Épernay, France
19:00 CEST (UTC+2)	Cassamá 20'; Mbemba 61'	Report		Stadium: Stade Paul Chandon

27 July 2019 Friendly	Dijon	1–3	Reims	Dijon, France
16:00 CEST (UTC+2)	Manga 52'	Report	Doumbia 43'; Mbuku 57'; Suk 90+2'	Stadium: Stade Gaston Gérard

3 August 2019 Friendly	Reims	3–1	Sheffield United	Reims, France
17:30 CEST (UTC+2)	Romao 27'; Oudin 51'; Chavalerin 57'	Report	Robinson 10'	Stadium: Stade Auguste-Delaune; Attendance: 3,007

5 September 2019 Friendly	Reims	1–2	Nancy	Reims, France
17:00 CEST (UTC+2)	Sakava 78'	Report	Romao 2' (o.g.); Bassi 17'	Stadium: Stade Auguste-Delaune

== Competitions ==
Win Draw Loss Fixtures

=== Overview ===
Competition	First match	Last match	Starting round	Final position	Record							
Competition	First match	Last match	Starting round	Final position	Pld	W	D	L	GF	GA	GD	Win %
Ligue 1	10 August 2019	7 March 2020	Matchday 1	6th	28	10	11	7	26	21	+5	35.71
Coupe de France	4 January 2020		Round of 64	Round of 64	1	0	0	1	1	2	−1	0.00
Coupe de la Ligue	30 October 2019	22 January 2020	Round of 32	Semi-finals	4	2	1	1	3	4	−1	50.00
Total					33	12	12	9	30	27	+3	36.36

Source: Soccerway

=== Ligue 1 ===
==== League table ====
Pos	Team	Pld	W	D	L	GF	GA	GD	Pts	PPG	Qualification or relegation
4	Lille	28	15	4	9	35	27	+8	49	1.75	Qualification for the Europa League group stage (Note: Since the winners of the Coupe de France and the Coupe de la Ligue, Paris Saint-Germain, qualified for the Champions League, the spot given to the Coupe de France winners (Europa League group stage) was passed to the fifth-placed team and the spot given to the Coupe de la Ligue winners (Europa League second qualifying round) was passed to the sixth-placed team.)
5	Nice	28	11	8	9	41	38	+3	41 (Note: Nice finished ahead of Reims on head-to-head points: Nice 2–0 Reims, Reims 1–1 Nice.)	1.46	Qualification for the Europa League group stage
6	Reims	28	10	11	7	26	21	+5	41	1.46	Qualification for the Europa League second qualifying round
7	Lyon	28	11	7	10	42	27	+15	40	1.43	
8	Montpellier	28	11	7	10	35	34	+1	40	1.43	

Source: Ligue 1
Rules for classification: 1) Points per game; 2) Head-to-head points; 3) Head-to-head goal difference; 4) Goal difference; 5) Goals scored; 6) Fairplay ranking.

==== Results summary ====
Overall								Home						Away					
Pld	W	D	L	GF	GA	GD	Pts	W	D	L	GF	GA	GD	W	D	L	GF	GA	GD
28	10	11	7	26	21	+5	41	5	7	2	12	7	+5	5	4	5	14	14	0

Last updated: 7 March 2020.
Source: Ligue 1

==== Results by round ====
Round	1	2	3	4	5	6	7	8	9	10	11	12	13	14	15	16	17	18	19	20	21	22	23	24	25	26	27	28	29	30	31	32	33	34	35	36	37	38
Ground	A	H	A	H	A	H	A	H	A	H	H	A	H	A	H	A	H	A	H	A	H	A	H	A	H	A	A	H	A	H	A	H	A	H	A	H	A	H
Result	W	D	L	W	L	D	W	L	W	W	D	L	D	D	D	D	W	W	D	L	L	W	D	L	W	D	D	W	C	C	C	C	C	C	C	C	C	C
Position	4	5	8	6	11	10	8	10	6	3	4	7	8	7	11	10	9	6	10	8	11	7	7	10	8	8	8	5	6	6	6	6	6	6	6	6	6	6

Source: Ligue 1
A = Away; H = Home; W = Win; D = Draw; L = Loss; C = Cancelled

==== Matches ====
The Ligue 1 schedule was announced on 14 June 2019. The Ligue 1 matches were suspended by the LFP on 13 March 2020 due to COVID-19 until further notices. On 28 April 2020, it was announced that Ligue 1 and Ligue 2 campaigns would not resume, after the country banned all sporting events until September. On 30 April, The LFP ended officially the 2019–20 season.

10 August 2019 1	Marseille	0–2	Reims	Marseille
17:30 CEST (UTC+2)	Kamara (yellow card) 29'	Report	Dia 58'; Suk 90'	Stadium: Stade Vélodrome; Attendance: 52,887; Referee: Jérôme Brisard

18 August 2019 2	Reims	0–0	Strasbourg	Reims
17:00 CEST (UTC+2)	Doumbia (yellow card) 37'; Kamara (yellow card) 54'	Report		Stadium: Stade Auguste Delaune; Attendance: 13,714; Referee: Florent Batta

24 August 2019 3	Brest	1–0	Reims	Brest
20:00 CEST (UTC+2)	Charbonnier (yellow card) 60', (goal) 86'	Report	Dingomé (yellow card) 61'	Stadium: Stade Francis-Le Blé; Attendance: 13,940; Referee: Hakim Ben El Hadj

1 September 2019 4	Reims	2–0	Lille	Reims
15:00 CEST (UTC+2)	Romao (yellow card) 36'; Doumbia 73' (pen.), (yellow card) 78'; Chavalerin (yellow card) 87'; Oudin 90'	Report	Yazıcı (yellow card) 40' (yellow-red card) 53'	Stadium: Stade Auguste Delaune; Attendance: 14,477; Referee: Eric Wattellier

15 September 2019 5	Nantes	1–0	Reims	Nantes
15:00 CEST (UTC+2)	Pallois (yellow card) 47'; Coulibaly 69'	Report	Kamara (yellow card) 67'; Romao (yellow card) 78'; Chavalerin (yellow card) 86'	Stadium: Stade de la Beaujoire; Attendance: 18,897; Referee: Willy Delajod

21 September 2019 6	Reims	0–0	Monaco	Reims
20:00 CEST (UTC+2)		Report	Silva (yellow card) 76'; Dias (yellow card) 90+2'	Stadium: Stade Auguste Delaune; Attendance: 14,426; Referee: Olivier Thual

25 September 2019 7	Paris Saint-Germain	0–2	Reims	Paris
21:00 CEST (UTC+2)	Bernat (yellow card) 45+3'	Report	Kamara 29'; Donis (yellow card) 40'; Rajković (yellow card) 83'; Dia 90+4'	Stadium: Parc des Princes; Attendance: 47,376; Referee: François Letexier

28 September 2019 8	Reims	1–2	Dijon	Reims
20:00 CEST (UTC+2)	Chavalerin 17'; Disasi (yellow card) 30'	Report	Tavares 19'; Lautoa (yellow card) 43'; Baldé 48'; Ndong (yellow card) 72'	Stadium: Stade Auguste Delaune; Attendance: 11,033; Referee: Jérémie Pignard

6 October 2019 9	Rennes	0–1	Reims	Rennes
17:00 CEST (UTC+2)	Gelin (yellow card) 14'	Report	Disasi (yellow card) 45+1'; Dia 49'; Oudin (yellow card) 73'; Suk (yellow card) 84'	Stadium: Roazhon Park; Attendance: 20,950; Referee: Stéphanie Frappart

19 October 2019 10	Reims	1–0	Montpellier	Reims
20:00 CEST (UTC+2)	Abdelhamid 3'; Cafaro (yellow card) 61'; Romao (yellow card) 83'	Report		Stadium: Stade Auguste Delaune; Attendance: 12,187; Referee: Florent Batta

26 October 2019 11	Reims	0–0	Nîmes	Reims
20:00 CEST (UTC+2)	Chavalerin (yellow card) 45+1'; Romao (yellow card) 59'; Foket (yellow card) 87'	Report	Fomba (yellow card) 39'	Stadium: Stade Auguste Delaune; Attendance: 12,329; Referee: Clément Turpin

3 November 2019 12	Nice	2–0	Reims	Nice
17:00 CET (UTC+1)	Atal (yellow card) 16'; Cyprien 33'; Hérelle 42'	Report	Doumbia (yellow card) 26' (yellow-red card) 26'; Romao (yellow card) 33'	Stadium: Allianz Riviera; Attendance: 15,468; Referee: Jérémy Stinat

9 November 2019 13	Reims	0–0	Angers	Reims
20:00 CET (UTC+1)	Munetsi (yellow card) 72'; Oudin (yellow card) 72'	Report	Fulgini (yellow card) 23' (yellow-red card) 71'; Santamaria (yellow card) 50'	Stadium: Stade Auguste Delaune; Attendance: 10,876; Referee: Hakim Ben El Hadj

23 November 2019 14	Metz	1–1	Reims	Metz
20:00 CET (UTC+1)	Boye (yellow card) 13'; Traoré 47'; Diallo (yellow card) 90+1'	Report	Disasi 7'; Cafaro (yellow card) 42' (yellow-red card) 90'	Stadium: Stade Saint-Symphorien; Attendance: 14,445; Referee: Antony Gautier

30 November 2019 15	Reims	1–1	Bordeaux	Reims
20:00 CET (UTC+1)	Romao (yellow card) 69' (yellow-red card) 73'; Dia 90+3'	Report	Mexer (yellow card) 6'; Maja 27'	Stadium: Stade Auguste Delaune; Attendance: 12,949; Referee: Jérôme Brisard

8 December 2019 17	Reims	3–1	Saint-Étienne	Reims
15:00 CET (UTC+1)	Oudin 11'; Foket (yellow card) 33'; Dia 68'; Kamara (yellow card) 90'; Doumbia 90+2'	Report	Fofana (yellow card) 6'; Aholou (yellow card) 54'; Hamouma 59'; Bouanga (yellow card) 64'	Stadium: Stade Auguste Delaune; Attendance: 14,512; Referee: Stéphanie Frappart

14 December 2019 18	Toulouse	0–1	Reims	Toulouse
20:00 CET (UTC+1)		Report	Oudin 9'; Romao (yellow card) 29'; Chavalerin (yellow card) 79'	Stadium: Stadium de Toulouse; Attendance: 12,577; Referee: Clément Turpin

21 December 2019 19	Reims	1–1	Lyon	Reims
20:45 CET (UTC+1)	Disasi (yellow card) 8'; Chavalerin (yellow card) 36'; Cafaro 44' (pen.)	Report	Tousart 9'; Aouar (yellow card) 20'; Marcelo (yellow card) 41'; Jean Lucas (yellow card) 88'	Stadium: Stade Auguste-Delaune; Attendance: 17,257; Referee: Frank Schneider

11 January 2020 20	Nîmes	2–0	Reims	Nîmes
20:00 CET (UTC+1)	Ripart 16'; Martinez (yellow card) 78'; Benrahou 90+2'	Report	Romao (yellow card) 35' (yellow-red card) 57'; Suk (yellow card) 46'; Doumbia (yellow card) 55'; Kamara (yellow card) 63'	Stadium: Stade des Costières; Attendance: 11,867; Referee: Olivier Thual

15 January 2020 16	Amiens	1–1	Reims	Amiens
19:00 CET (UTC+1)	Zungu (yellow card) 20'; Konaté 54'	Report	Kutesa 45+1'; Doumbia (yellow card) 72'; Nkada (yellow card) 78'; Suk (yellow card) 90+4'	Stadium: Stade de la Licorne; Attendance: 10,712; Referee: Johan Hamel
Note: Match originally scheduled for 4 December, but postponed due to fog, and rearranged for 15 January 2020.

25 January 2020 21	Reims	0–1	Metz	Reims
20:00 CET (UTC+1)	Doumbia (yellow card) 39'	Report	Diallo 3'; Maïga (yellow card) 59'	Stadium: Stade Auguste Delaune; Attendance: 11,818; Referee: Jérémie Pignard

1 February 2020 22	Angers	1–4	Reims	Angers
20:00 CET (UTC+1)	Alioui 7'; Capelle (yellow card) 36'	Report	Cassamá (yellow card) 27'; Touré 38' (pen.), (yellow card) 51'; Abdelhamid 62'; Santamaria 74' (o.g.); Dia 75'	Stadium: Stade Raymond Kopa; Attendance: 9,267; Referee: Amaury Delerue

5 February 2020 23	Reims	1–1	Nice	Reims
19:00 CET (UTC+1)	Cassamá (yellow card) 72'; Abdelhamid 77'; Chavalerin (yellow card) 78'	Report	Lees-Melou 50'	Stadium: Stade Auguste Delaune; Attendance: 11,384; Referee: Eric Wattellier

9 February 2020 24	Strasbourg	3–0	Reims	Strasbourg
17:00 CET (UTC+1)	Liénard (yellow card) 45'; Djiku 50'; Waris 82'; Lala 90+4' (pen.)	Report	Touré (yellow card) 67'; Doumbia (yellow card) 78'	Stadium: Stade de la Meinau; Attendance: 25,241; Referee: Thomas Léonard

16 February 2020 25	Reims	1–0	Rennes	Reims
17:00 CET (UTC+1)	Cassamá (yellow card) 59'; Touré 72' (pen.)	Report	Raphinha (yellow card) 82'	Stadium: Stade Auguste Delaune; Attendance: 13,026; Referee: Florent Batta

23 February 2020 26	Saint-Étienne	1–1	Reims	Saint-Étienne
15:00 CET (UTC+1)	Kolodziejczak (yellow card) 41'; Bouanga 73'	Report	Munetsi (yellow card) 87'; Dia 90+3' (pen.)	Stadium: Stade Geoffroy-Guichard; Attendance: 24,868; Referee: Benoît Bastien

29 February 2020 27	Monaco	1–1	Reims	Monaco
20:00 CET (UTC+1)	Ben Yedder 31' (pen.); Keita (yellow card) 55'; Tchouaméni (yellow card) 81'	Report	Foket (yellow card) 29'; Kamara 58'; Romao (yellow card) 74'; Munetsi (yellow card) 84'	Stadium: Stade Louis II; Attendance: 4,237; Referee: Hakim Ben El Hadj

7 March 2020 28	Reims	1–0	Brest	Reims
20:00 CET (UTC+1)	Kamara (yellow card) 10'; Konan (yellow card) 27' (yellow-red card) 68'; Touré 37'	Report	Belkebla (yellow card) 32'; Magnetti (yellow card) 83'	Stadium: Stade Auguste Delaune; Attendance: 11,062; Referee: Karim Abed

29	Lyon	Cancelled	Reims	Décines-Charpieu
--:-- CET (UTC+1)				Stadium: Parc Olympique Lyonnais; Attendance: 0

30	Reims	Cancelled	Nantes	Reims
--:-- CET (UTC+1)				Stadium: Stade Auguste Delaune; Attendance: 0

31	Bordeaux	Cancelled	Reims	Bordeaux
--:-- CEST (UTC+2)				Stadium: Matmut Atlantique; Attendance: 0

32	Reims	Cancelled	Toulouse	Reims
--:-- CEST (UTC+2)				Stadium: Stade Auguste Delaune

33	Montpellier	Cancelled	Reims	Montpellier
--:-- CEST (UTC+2)				Stadium: Stade de la Mosson

34	Reims	Cancelled	Paris Saint-Germain	Reims
--:-- CEST (UTC+2)				Stadium: Stade Auguste-Delaune

35	Lille	Cancelled	Reims	Villeneuve-d'Ascq
--:-- CEST (UTC+2)				Stadium: Stade Pierre-Mauroy

36	Reims	Cancelled	Amiens	Reims
--:-- CEST (UTC+2)				Stadium: Stade Auguste-Delaune

37	Dijon	Cancelled	Reims	Dijon
--:-- CEST (UTC+2)				Stadium: Stade Gaston Gérard

38	Reims	Cancelled	Marseille	Reims
--:-- CEST (UTC+2)				Stadium: Stade Auguste-Delaune

=== Coupe de France ===
4 January 2020 Round of 64	Monaco	2–1	Reims	Monaco
15:00 CET (UTC+1)	Ballo-Touré (yellow card) 54'; Keita 61', 90+4', (yellow card) 90+4'; Silva (yellow card) 84'; Ben Yedder (yellow card) 90'	Report	Munetsi (yellow card) 65'; Dia 69'	Stadium: Stade Louis II; Attendance: 3,500; Referee: Willy Delajod

=== Coupe de la Ligue ===
30 October 2019 Round of 32	Reims	2–1	Bourg-Péronnas	Reims
21:05 CET (UTC+1)	Kutesa 14'; Doumbia 35'	Report	Matam 74'; Lacour (yellow card) 90'	Stadium: Stade Auguste Delaune; Attendance: 5,479; Referee: Eric Wattellier

17 December 2019 Round of 16	Reims	1–0	Montpellier	Reims
18:45 CET (UTC+1)	Cafaro 78' (pen.); Oudin (yellow card) 90'	Report	Ristić (red card) 69'; Mendes (yellow card) 77'	Stadium: Stade Auguste-Delaune; Attendance: 4,606; Referee: Willy Delajod

7 January 2020 Quarter-finals	Reims	0–0 (4–2 p)	Strasbourg	Reims
21:00 CET (UTC+1)	Chavalerin (yellow card) 36'; Mbuku (red card) 58'	Report	Sissoko (yellow card) 47'	Stadium: Stade Auguste-Delaune; Attendance: 10,202; Referee: François Letexier
	Penalties
	Donis (penalty missed); Oudin (penalty scored); Disasi (penalty scored); Kamara (penalty scored); Abdelhamid (penalty scored)		(penalty scored) Djiku; (penalty scored) Ajorque; (penalty missed) Bellegarde; (penalty missed) Corgnet

22 January 2020 Semi-finals	Reims	0–3	Paris Saint-Germain	Reims
21:00 CET (UTC+1)	Munetsi (red card) 73'; Rajković (yellow card) 85'	Report	Marquinhos 9'; Konan 31' (o.g.); Draxler (yellow card) 38'; Kouassi 77'; Verratti (yellow card) 82'; Mbappé (yellow card) 90'	Stadium: Stade Auguste-Delaune; Attendance: 20,437; Referee: Mikael Lesage

== Statistics ==
=== Appearances and goals ===
No.	Pos	Nat	Player	Total		Ligue 1		Coupe de France		Coupe de la Ligue	
No.	Pos	Nat	Player	Apps	Goals	Apps	Goals	Apps	Goals	Apps	Goals
Goalkeepers
1	GK	(Serbia) SRB	Predrag Rajković	30	0	27	0	0	0	3	0
16	GK	(France) FRA	Nicolas Lemaître	3	0	1	0	1	0	1	0
30	GK	(France) FRA	Yehvann Diouf	0	0	0	0	0	0	0	0
Defenders
3	DF	(Ivory Coast) CIV	Ghislain Konan	17	0	15+1	0	0	0	1	0
5	DF	(Morocco) MAR	Yunis Abdelhamid	33	3	28	3	1	0	4	0
6	DF	(France) FRA	Axel Disasi	32	1	27	1	1	0	4	0
13	DF	(France) FRA	Hassane Kamara	28	2	18+5	2	1	0	4	0
29	DF	(Austria) AUT	Dario Maresic	1	0	1	0	0	0	0	0
32	DF	(Belgium) BEL	Thomas Foket	32	0	27	0	1	0	4	0
Midfielders
4	MF	(Togo) TOG	Alaixys Romao	25	0	21+1	0	0	0	3	0
7	MF	(France) FRA	Xavier Chavalerin	28	1	24	1	1	0	3	0
8	MF	(Switzerland) SUI	Dereck Kutesa	17	2	4+10	1	0+1	0	1+1	1
14	MF	(France) FRA	Sambou Sissoko	4	0	0+3	0	0	0	0+1	0
15	MF	(Zimbabwe) ZIM	Marshall Munetsi	21	0	8+9	0	1	0	3	0
17	MF	(Kosovo) KOS	Arbër Zeneli	1	0	0+1	0	0	0	0	0
20	MF	(Cameroon) CMR	Tristan Dingomé	18	0	12+3	0	1	0	0+2	0
23	MF	(Guinea-Bissau) GBS	Moreto Cassamá	7	1	7	1	0	0	0	0
24	MF	(France) FRA	Mathieu Cafaro	17	2	12+1	1	1	0	2+1	1
25	MF	(Mali) MLI	Moussa Doumbia	31	3	22+4	2	0+1	0	4	1
26	MF	(France) FRA	Nolan Mbemba	0	0	0	0	0	0	0	0
27	MF	(France) FRA	Virgile Pinson	0	0	0	0	0	0	0	0
Forwards
9	FW	(Greece) GRE	Anastasios Donis	20	0	6+9	0	1	0	1+3	0
10	FW	(Netherlands) NED	Kaj Sierhuis	1	0	1	0	0	0	0	0
11	FW	(France) FRA	Boulaye Dia	28	8	21+3	7	0+1	1	2+1	0
19	FW	(France) FRA	Timothé Nkada	8	0	0+8	0	0	0	0	0
33	FW	(France) FRA	Nathanaël Mbuku	13	0	3+8	0	0	0	1+1	0
34	FW	(Mali) MLI	El Bilal Touré	7	3	6+1	3	0	0	0	0
Players transferred out during the season
10	FW	(South Korea) KOR	Suk Hyun-jun	16	1	1+12	1	0	0	1+2	0
18	FW	(France) FRA	Rémi Oudin	21	3	16+2	3	1	0	2	0

Last updated: 7 March 2020
Source: Competitions
