= Suk Hyun-jun =

South Korean footballer (born 1991)

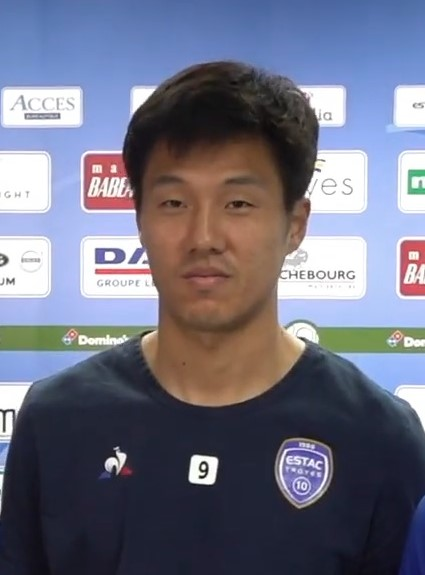
- Suk with Troyes in 2020

Personal information
- Date of birth: 29 June 1991 (age 35)
- Place of birth: Chungju, Chungbuk, South Korea
- Height: 1.90 m (6 ft 3 in)
- Position: Forward

Team information
- Current team: Yongin FC
- Number: 9

Youth career
- 2007–2009: Shingal High School
- 2009–2011: Ajax

Senior career*
Years	Team	Apps	(Gls)
2009–2010	Ajax	3	(0)
2010–2011	Ajax Amateurs		
2011–2012	Groningen	27	(5)
2013	Marítimo	14	(4)
2013–2014	Al-Ahli	14	(2)
2014–2015	Nacional	13	(2)
2015–2016	Vitória de Setúbal	33	(13)
2016–2018	Porto	9	(1)
2016–2017	→ Trabzonspor (loan)	10	(0)
2017	→ Debrecen (loan)	13	(1)
2017–2018	→ Troyes (loan)	26	(6)
2018	Troyes	1	(0)
2018–2020	Reims	35	(4)
2020–2022	Troyes	32	(5)
2022	Troyes B	4	(1)
2025	Namyangju FC (draft)	12	(4)
2026–	Yongin FC	18	(5)

International career
2009–2011	South Korea U20	5	(1)
2011–2016	South Korea U23	6 (Note: Includes five appearances and three goals as an overage player (four appearances and three goals in Summer Olympics, one appearance in friendlies).)	(3)
2010–2018	South Korea	15	(5)
Korean name
Hangul	석현준
Hanja	石現俊
RR	Seok Hyeonjun
MR	Sŏk Hyŏnjun
IPA	[sʌ.kʰjʌn.dʑun] or [sʌ.k̚] [çʌn.dʑun]
- * Club domestic league appearances and goals as of 6 August 2026

Suk Hyun-jun (Korean: 석현준; born 29 June 1991) is a South Korean footballer who plays as a forward for K League 2 club, Yongin FC.

== Club career ==
=== Ajax ===
After initially trialling with Eredivisie side Ajax, Suk signed 1.5-year contract with the Dutch club in October 2010. The contract effective from 1 January 2010 also included the option for Ajax to extend by another year. He made his debut in the first team in February as a substitute in a 4–0 home win against Roda JC.

He scored his first Ajax goal in a 2010–11 pre-season friendly win against Chelsea on 23 July 2010. He did not play in any official first-team matches during the 2010–11 season and his contract at Ajax was not renewed.

=== Groningen ===
On 27 June 2011, Suk signed a two-year contract with Groningen including an option for a two-year extension. He scored five goals in his first season with Groningen including two goals against PSV Eindhoven, showing the potential for growth. However, he did not score in the next season and had to leave the club.

=== Marítimo ===
In January 2013, Suk signed with Primeira Liga club Marítimo. He netted his first goal for Marítimo in his third match, a 1–0 win against Sporting CP. He scored his second goal in a 1–1 draw with Porto. He moved to Saudi club Al-Ahli after making four goals for half a year in Marítimo. Vítor Pereira, the new Al-Ahli manager and previous Porto manager, was interested in Suk's performance in Portugal.

=== Vitória de Setúbal ===
Suk joined Nacional after having an unsuccessful time in Al-Ahli due to a toe injury. However, he also failed to settle in Nacional, and transferred to another Portuguese club Vitória de Setúbal on 12 January 2015.

During the 2014–15 season, he achieved double-digit goals in a season for the first time by scoring five goals for Vitória in addition to five goals for Nacional. In the next season, he spent his prime by scoring 11 goals during the first half of the season. His long-range goal against Académica was named Primeira Liga Goal of the Month for August and September 2015. On 2 January 2016, he scored an unstoppable free-kick only four minutes into a match against Braga.

=== Porto ===
Suk moved to Porto on 15 January 2016 after his great performances in Setúbal. However, his transfer to Porto was not good choice as a result. His flow was stopped for the rest of the season, and he moved to Trabzonspor on 11 August 2016 on a one-year loan with an option to sign permanently. According to Trabzonspor's stock market report the fee paid to Porto by Trabzonspor was €750,000 and Suk was going to make more than €1 million a year.

On 31 January 2017, after half a season at Trabzonspor and not finding much success, Suk's loan was cut short. The same day, a move to Bastia broke down although a loan agreement with Porto had been signed. The reason given by Bastia was that administrative documents had not been transferred in time.

On 14 February 2017, Suk joined Hungarian side Debrecen on loan for the rest of the season.

=== Troyes ===
On 30 August 2017, Suk was again sent on loan, joining Ligue 1 club Troyes for 2017–18 season. Suk made his first goal for Troyes in his fifth Ligue 1 appearance against Strasbourg. Afterwards, he scored in subsequent two league matches, starting the season strong. On 9 December, he scored two goals against Monaco with his concentration on the ball. However, in a league match against Angers on 17 January 2018, he suffered an ankle injury that saw him sidelined for over a month. He eventually lost his previous form after the injury, adding only one goal for the remainder of the season.

In June 2018, after being relegated to Ligue 2, Troyes signed Suk permanently. He played the first league match of the season. In August 2018, Suk moved to Reims, who had been promoted to Ligue 1 for the 2018–19 season. Reims paid Troyes a transfer fee of €2.75 million plus €4 million in potential bonuses.

However, Suk returned to Troyes in January 2020 after disappointing Reims. In July 2022, his contract with the club was terminated.

=== Jeonju Citizen ===
Suk was largely criticised for trying to evade his mandatory military service since April 2019. He was on the list of draft dodgers of the Military Manpower Administration in December 2020 by rejecting their demand for his return.

After he left from Troyes, he returned to South Korea and started to stand trial. On 24 February 2023, Suk joined K4 League club Jeonju Citizen during the trial. He could play for Jeonju Citizen before the court judgement, and could continue to play as a social service agent if the court did not disallow his alternative service. However, Jeonju Citizen cancelled his registration on the list of its players.

=== Namyangju FC ===
In October 2023, Suk was given a one-year suspended sentence by the court. After the end of the grace period, he joined Namyangju FC, another K4 League club at which social service agents could serve, on 12 February 2025. He scored four goals in 12 K4 League matches for a year.

=== Yongin FC ===
On 15 December 2025, newly-formed K League 2 club Yongin FC announced that they had signed Suk as their first player.

== International career ==
In November 2009, Suk took part in the 2010 AFC U-19 Championship qualification.

On 7 September 2010, Suk made his senior international debut in a friendly against Iran.

Suk played for South Korean under-23 team as an over-aged player in the 2016 Summer Olympics. He scored twice against Fiji, and once against Germany.

== Personal life ==
Suk is a devout Christian. Some people have mistakenly thought that Suk was Muslim due to his goal celebration resembling the Salat. However, Suk himself said this was not true and that his celebration was modeled after Kaká's. Suk's tendency to visibly pray in matches has occasionally been criticized by Korean pundits and fans.

Suk also has two visible sleeve tattoos on his arms.

During his time at Porto, Suk became good friends with Spanish goalkeeping legend Iker Casillas.

On 13 March 2020, during the COVID-19 pandemic, it was confirmed that Suk had tested positive for the coronavirus in Italy.

== Career statistics ==
=== Club ===
As of 28 September 2025

Appearances and goals by club, season and competition
Club	Season	League			National cup		League cup		Continental		Other		Total	
Club	Season	Division	Apps	Goals	Apps	Goals	Apps	Goals	Apps	Goals	Apps	Goals	Apps	Goals
Ajax	2009–10	Eredivisie	3	0	0	0	—		2	0	—		5	0
Ajax	2010–11	Eredivisie	0	0	0	0	—		0	0	1 (Note: Appearance in Johan Cruyff Shield)	0	1	0
Ajax	Total		3	0	0	0	—		2	0	1	0	6	0
Ajax Amateurs	2010–11	Eerste Klasse A	?	?	—		—		—		?	?	?	?
Groningen	2011–12	Eredivisie	20	5	0	0	—		—		—		20	5
Groningen	2012–13	Eredivisie	7	0	1	0	—		—		—		8	0
Groningen	Total		27	5	1	0	—		—		—		28	5
Marítimo	2012–13	Primeira Liga	14	4	0	0	0	0	—		—		14	4
Al-Ahli	2013–14	Saudi Pro League	14	2	1	0	2	0	1	0	—		18	2
Nacional	2014–15	Primeira Liga	13	2	3	3	1	0	2	0	—		19	5
Vitória de Setúbal	2014–15	Primeira Liga	17	4	0	0	4	1	—		—		21	5
Vitória de Setúbal	2015–16	Primeira Liga	16	9	3	2	1	0	—		—		20	11
Vitória de Setúbal	Total		33	13	3	2	5	1	—		—		41	16
Porto	2015–16	Primeira Liga	9	1	1	1	2	0	2	0	—		14	2
Trabzonspor (loan)	2016–17	Süper Lig	10	0	7	1	—		—		—		17	1
Debrecen (loan)	2016–17	Nemzeti Bajnokság I	13	1	0	0	—		0	0	—		13	1
Troyes (loan)	2017–18	Ligue 1	26	6	0	0	1	0	—		—		27	6
Troyes	2018–19	Ligue 2	1	0	0	0	0	0	—		—		1	0
Reims	2018–19	Ligue 1	22	3	0	0	1	0	—		—		23	3
Reims	2019–20	Ligue 1	13	1	0	0	3	0	—		—		16	1
Reims	Total		35	4	0	0	4	0	—		—		39	4
Troyes	2019–20	Ligue 2	5	2	0	0	—		—		—		5	2
Troyes	2020–21	Ligue 2	18	3	0	0	—		—		—		18	3
Troyes	2021–22	Ligue 1	9	0	1	0	—		—		—		10	0
Troyes	Total		32	5	1	0	—		—		—		33	5
Troyes B	2021–22	National 3	4	1	—		—		—		—		4	1
Namyangju FC	2025	K4 League	12	4	1	0	—		—		—		13	4
Career total			246	48	18	7	15	1	7	0	1	0	287	56

=== International ===
Scores and results list South Korea's goal tally first, score column indicates score after each Suk goal.

List of international goals scored by Suk Hyun-jun
No.	Date	Venue	Opponent	Score	Result	Competition
1	3 September 2015	Hwaseong Stadium, Hwaseong, South Korea	Laos	4–0	8–0	2018 FIFA World Cup qualification
2	17 November 2015	New Laos National Stadium, Vientiane, Laos	Laos	4–0	5–0	2018 FIFA World Cup qualification
3	27 March 2016	Suphachalasai Stadium, Bangkok, Thailand	Thailand	1–0	1–0	Friendly
4	5 June 2016	Eden Arena, Prague, Czech Republic	Czech Republic	2–0	2–1	Friendly
5	20 November 2018	Queensland Sport and Athletics Centre, Brisbane, Australia	Uzbekistan	4–0	4–0	Friendly

== Honours ==
Al-Ahli

- King Cup runner-up: 2014

Porto

- Taça de Portugal runner-up: 2015–16

Troyes

- Ligue 2: 2020–21

Individual

- Primeira Liga Goal of the Month: August/September 2015
