= Nathanaël Mbuku =

Congolese footballer (born 2002)

Personal information
- Full name: Nathanaël Mbuku Wa Mbuku
- Date of birth: 16 March 2002 (age 24)
- Place of birth: Villeneuve-Saint-Georges, France
- Height: 1.70 m (5 ft 7 in)
- Position: Forward

Team information
- Current team: Sint-Truiden (on loan from Augsburg)
- Number: 11

Youth career
- 2008–2009: Villeneuvois
- 2009–2011: Alfortville
- 2011–2012: Maccabi Paris
- 2012–2014: US Ris-Orangis
- 2014–2016: Lusitanos Saint-Maur
- 2016–2017: Fleury
- 2017–2018: Reims

Senior career*
Years	Team	Apps	(Gls)
2018–2023	Reims B	10	(0)
2019–2023	Reims	80	(6)
2023–2024	Augsburg II	4	(2)
2023–2024	Augsburg	3	(0)
2024	→ Saint-Étienne (loan)	18	(3)
2024–2025	Dinamo Zagreb	16	(2)
2025–	Augsburg	0	(0)
2025–2026	→ Montpellier (loan)	30	(4)
2026–	→ Sint-Truiden (loan)	3	(0)

International career^{‡}
2017–2018	France U16	9	(2)
2018–2019	France U17	19	(5)
2019	France U18	11	(7)
2021	France U20	3	(0)
2021	France U21	2	(1)
2021	France Olympic	3	(1)
2024–	DR Congo	26	(3)
Medal record
Men's football
Representing France
FIFA U-17 World Cup
Third place	2019 Brazil
- * Club domestic league appearances and goals as of 20 September 2026 ‡ National team caps and goals as of 5 October 2026

Nathanaël Mbuku Wa Mbuku (born 16 March 2002) is a professional footballer who plays as a forward for Belgian Pro League club Sint-Truiden on loan from German club Augsburg. Born in France, he plays for the DR Congo national team.

== Club career ==
=== Reims ===
On 23 November 2018, Mbuku signed his first professional contract with Stade de Reims for three years. He made his professional debut with Reims in a 2–0 Ligue 1 win over Olympique de Marseille on 10 August 2019.

He scored his first goal in Ligue 1 in a 4–0 win against Montpellier on 25 October 2020, from an "acrobatic kick". His teammate Boulaye Dia also scored from a penalty after Mbuku was fouled. The win was Reims' first in the league in the 2020–21 season.

=== FC Augsburg ===
On 30 January 2023, Mbuku signed a four-and-a-half-year contract with FC Augsburg in Germany's Bundesliga.

In January 2024, he joined Ligue 2 club Saint-Étienne on loan for the remainder of the season.

=== Dinamo Zagreb ===
On 3 September 2024, Mbuku signed a multi-year contract with Dinamo Zagreb in Croatia. Augsburg reserved an option to buy him back at the end of the 2024–25 season.

==== Return to FC Augsburg and loan to Montpellier ====
In July 2025, FC Augsburg bought him back and Mbuku moved to Montpellier in France on loan with an option to buy.

==== Loan to Sint-Truiden ====
On 3 September 2026, Mbuku moved on a new loan to Sint-Truiden in Belgium, with an option to buy.

== International career ==
With the France U-17 national team, Mbuku took part in the UEFA European Under-17 Championship held in Ireland. He featured in five matches during the tournament. He made an impact by scoring a goal against the Netherlands in the group stage, and later provided an assist in the semi-final against Italy, which ended in a 1–2 defeat.

A few months later, he participated in the 2019 FIFA U-17 World Cup in Brazil. During the tournament, he again played five matches. He stood out by scoring a hat-trick in the Round of 16 against Australia. In the quarter-final against Spain, he contributed with a goal and an assist. He scored once more in the semi-final against the host nation, Brazil. France eventually won the bronze medal by defeating the Netherlands in the third-place playoff on 17 November 2019. Individually, Mbuku was awarded the Adidas Silver Boot as the tournament's second-highest goalscorer.

On 2 July 2021, he was named in the 21-man squad selected by Sylvain Ripoll to represent France at the 2020 Summer Olympics, held in Japan in summer 2021. He made his debut for the France Olympic team on 16 July, coming on as a substitute for Arnaud Nordin in the 69th minute of a friendly match against South Korea. Mbuku scored the winning goal late in the game, securing a 2–1 victory.

In August 2024, he changed his sporting nationality and received his first call-up to the DR Congo national team for the 2025 Africa Cup of Nations qualification against Guinea on 6 September and Ethiopia on 9 September.

On 19 May 2026, he was included in the 26-man squad selected by head coach Sébastien Desabre to represent the DR Congo at the 2026 FIFA World Cup.

== Personal life ==
Born in France, Mbuku holds French and Congolese nationalities.

== Career statistics ==
=== Club ===
As of match played 20 September 2026

Appearances and goals by club, season and competition
Club	Season	League			National cup		Other		Total	
Club	Season	Division	Apps	Goals	Apps	Goals	Apps	Goals	Apps	Goals
Reims B	2018–19	CFA 2	8	0	—		—		8	0
Reims B	2019–20	CFA 2	1	0	—		—		1	0
Reims B	2022–23	CFA 2	1	0	—		—		1	0
Reims B	Total		10	0	—		—		10	0
Reims	2019–20	Ligue 1	11	0	0	0	2 (Note: Appearances in the Coupe de la Ligue)	0	13	0
Reims	2020–21	Ligue 1	32	4	1	0	—		33	4
Reims	2021–22	Ligue 1	31	2	2	0	—		33	2
Reims	2022–23	Ligue 1	6	0	0	0	—		6	0
Reims	Total		80	6	3	0	—		83	6
FC Augsburg	2022–23	Bundesliga	2	0	0	0	—		2	0
FC Augsburg	2023–24	Bundesliga	1	0	0	0	—		1	0
FC Augsburg	Total		3	0	0	0	—		3	0
FC Augsburg II	2022–23	Regionalliga Bayern	1	0	—		—		1	0
FC Augsburg II	2023–24	Regionalliga Bayern	3	2	—		—		3	2
FC Augsburg II	Total		4	2	—		—		4	2
Saint-Étienne (loan)	2023–24	Ligue 2	18	3	0	0	3 (Note: One appearance and one goal in the Ligue 2 promotion play-offs, two appearances in the Ligue 1 relegation/promotion play-offs)	1	21	4
Dinamo Zagreb	2024–25	Croatian Football League	16	2	2	0	2 (Note: Appearances in UEFA Champions League)	0	20	2
Montpellier (loan)	2025–26	Ligue 2	30	4	2	0	—		32	4
Sint-Truiden (loan)	2026–27	Belgian Pro League	3	0	0	0	—		3	0
Career total			164	17	7	0	7	1	178	18

=== International ===
As of match played 5 October 2026

Appearances and goals by national team and year
National team	Year	Apps	Goals
DR Congo	2024	3	0
DR Congo	2025	12	2
DR Congo	2026	11	1
Total		26	3

Scores and results list DR Congo's goal tally first, score column indicates score after each Mbuku goal.

List of international goals scored by Nathanaël Mbuku
No.	Date	Venue	Opponent	Score	Result	Competition
1	5 September 2025	Juba Stadium, Juba, South Sudan	South Sudan	3–0	4–1	2026 FIFA World Cup qualification
2	30 December 2025	Al Medina Stadium, Rabat, Morocco	Botswana	1–0	3–0	2025 Africa Cup of Nations
3	5 October 2026	FNB Stadium, Johannesburg, South Africa	Uganda	1–0	1–1	Friendly

== Honours ==
France U17

- FIFA U-17 World Cup bronze: 2019

Individual

- FIFA U-17 World Cup Silver Boot: 2019
