= Yunis Abdelhamid =

Footballer (born 1987)

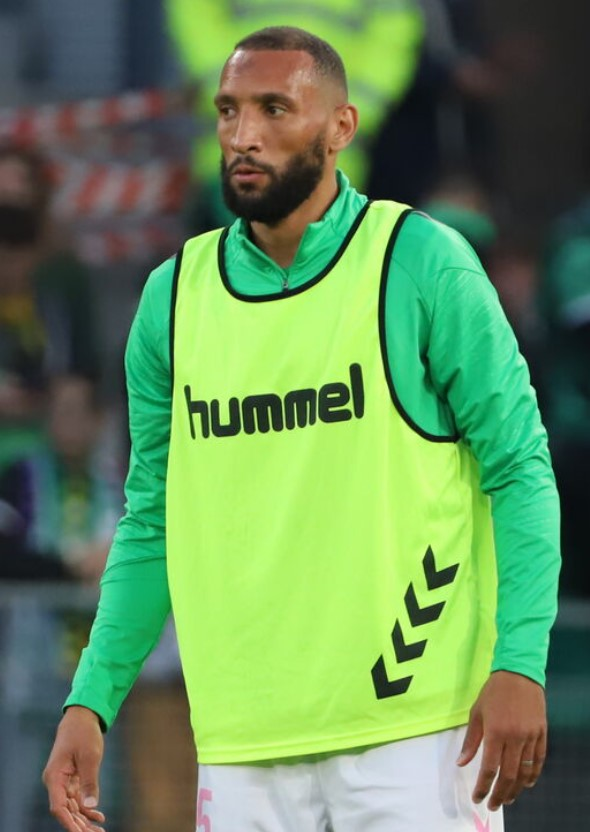
- Abdelhamid with Saint-Étienne in 2024

Personal information
- Date of birth: 28 September 1987 (age 39)
- Place of birth: Montpellier, France
- Height: 1.90 m (6 ft 3 in)
- Position: Centre-back

Team information
- Current team: AS FAR (assistant manager)

Youth career
- 2005–2010: AS Lattoise

Senior career*
Years	Team	Apps	(Gls)
2010–2011	AS Lattoise		
2011–2014	Arles-Avignon	87	(5)
2014–2016	Valenciennes	73	(3)
2016–2017	Dijon	18	(0)
2016–2017	Dijon B	4	(1)
2017–2024	Reims	251	(17)
2024–2025	Saint-Étienne	16	(0)
2025	Saint-Étienne B	1	(0)
2025–2026	AS FAR	6	(0)

International career^{‡}
2016–2024	Morocco	16	(0)
2025	Morocco A'	1	(0)

Managerial career
- 2026–: AS FAR (assistant)
- * Club domestic league appearances and goals as of 16 February 2026 ‡ National team caps and goals as of 19:10, 21 March 2026 (CET)

Yunis Abdelhamid (born 28 September 1987) is a Moroccan football manager and former player. He is currently an assistant manager of AS FAR.

== Club career ==
Out of contract from Valenciennes, Abdelhamid joined Dijon on a three-year contract on 15 May 2016.

Abdelhamid helped Reims win the 2017–18 Ligue 2 and get promoted to the Ligue 1 for the 2018–19 season. He was given the captaincy beginning with the 2020–21 Ligue 1 season, which he held until the end of his contract in 2024. He is considered a club legend.

Following the 2023–24 season, after seven years at Reims, Abdelhamid left the club as a free agent to sign for Saint-Étienne on a one-year contract with an optional additional year.

On 15 July 2025, Abdelhamid joined AS FAR on a one-year contract with an option for an additional year.

== International career ==
Abdelhamid was called up to the Morocco national team for a friendly against Albania on 1 September 2016, but did not feature. He made his official debut in a 2–0 2017 Africa Cup of Nations qualification win over São Tomé and Príncipe. He was part of Morocco's roster at the 2019 Africa Cup of Nations, in which they made the last 16.

On 28 December 2023, Abdelhamid was amongst the 27 players selected by coach Walid Regragui to represent Morocco in the 2023 Africa Cup of Nations. He started in the final group match against Zambia.

On 5 October 2025, Tarik Sektioui called up Abdelhamid to the Morocco A' national team for friendlies against Egypt and Kuwait in preparation for the 2025 FIFA Arab Cup. On 9 November 2025, Abdelhamid was among 29 players called up to take part in a training camp at the Mohammed VI Football Complex.

== Mauagerial career ==
In August 2026, Abdelhamid became an assistant manager for AS FAR.

== Career statistics ==
As of match played 19 May 2024

Appearances and goals by club, season and competition
Club	Season	League			National cup		League cup		Other		Total	
Club	Season	Division	Apps	Goals	Apps	Goals	Apps	Goals	Apps	Goals	Apps	Goals
Arles-Avignon	2011–12	Ligue 2	18	1	0	0	0	0	—		18	1
Arles-Avignon	2012–13	Ligue 2	34	2	2	0	3	0	—		39	2
Arles-Avignon	2013–14	Ligue 2	35	2	1	0	0	0	—		36	2
Arles-Avignon	Total		87	5	3	3	0	3	—		93	5
Valenciennes	2014–15	Ligue 2	38	1	4	0	1	0	—		43	1
Valenciennes	2015–16	Ligue 2	35	2	1	0	1	0	—		37	2
Valenciennes	Total		73	3	5	0	2	0	—		80	3
Dijon	2016–17	Ligue 1	18	0	2	0	1	0	—		21	0
Dijon B	2016–17	CFA 2	4	1	—		—		—		4	1
Reims	2017–18	Ligue 2	35	4	1	0	2	0	—		38	4
Reims	2018–19	Ligue 1	38	0	2	0	0	0	—		40	0
Reims	2019–20	Ligue 1	28	3	1	0	4	0	—		33	3
Reims	2020–21	Ligue 1	33	3	1	0	—		1	0	35	3
Reims	2021–22	Ligue 1	34	2	3	0	—		—		37	2
Reims	2022–23	Ligue 1	37	1	3	0	—		—		40	1
Reims	2023–24	Ligue 1	31	4	0	0	—		—		31	4
Reims	Total		236	17	11	0	6	0	1	0	254	17
Career total			418	26	21	0	8	0	1	0	448	26

== Honours ==
=== Player ===
Reims

- Ligue 2: 2017–18

AS FAR

- CAF Champions League runner-up: 2025–26

Individual

- UNFP Ligue 2 Player of the Month: February 2018
- UNFP Ligue 2 Team of the Year: 2017–18
- Prix Marc-Vivien Foé third place: 2020
