= 2018–19 Stade de Reims season =

Reims
2018–19 season
- Chairman: Jean-Pierre Caillot
- Manager: David Guion
- Stadium: Stade Auguste Delaune
- Ligue 1: 8th
- Coupe de France: Round of 32
- Coupe de la Ligue: Third round
- Highest home attendance: 20,546; 2 February 2019 v. Marseille
- Lowest home attendance: 10,028; 24 November 2018 v. Guingamp; All: 5,237; 31 October 2018 v. Orléans, CdlL R32
- Average home league attendance: 14,342
- Biggest win: 2–0; 28 October 2018 at Rennes
- Biggest defeat: 0–4; 3 April 2019 at Strasbourg
Home colours	Away colours	Third colours

The 2018–19 Stade de Reims season was the 87th professional season of the club since its creation in 1931.

== Players ==
=== First-team squad ===
As of 16 February 2019

Note: Flags indicate national team as defined under FIFA eligibility rules; some limited exceptions apply. Players may hold more than one non-FIFA nationality.

No.	Pos.	Nation	Player
1	GK	FRA	Johann Carrasso
2	DF	BEL	Björn Engels (on loan from Olympiacos)
3	DF	CIV	Ghislain Konan
4	MF	TOG	Alaixys Romao (3rd captain)
5	DF	MAR	Yunis Abdelhamid
6	DF	FRA	Axel Disasi
7	MF	FRA	Xavier Chavalerin
8	MF	FRA	Marvin Martin (captain)
10	FW	KOR	Suk Hyun-jun
11	MF	ENG	Sheyi Ojo (on loan from Liverpool)
12	FW	ARG	Pablo Chavarría (vice-captain)
13	DF	GAM	Hassane Kamara
14	DF	FRA	Sambou Sissoko
16	GK	SEN	Edouard Mendy
17	FW	KOS	Arbër Zeneli

No.	Pos.	Nation	Player
18	FW	FRA	Rémi Oudin
19	DF	MAD	Thomas Fontaine
20	MF	FRA	Tristan Dingomé
21	DF	GHA	Abdul Rahman Baba (on loan from Chelsea)
23	MF	POR	Moreto Cassamá
24	MF	FRA	Mathieu Cafaro
25	MF	MLI	Moussa Doumbia
26	MF	FRA	Nolan Mbemba
27	DF	FRA	Virgile Pinson
28	MF	FRA	Virgile Piechocki
30	GK	FRA	Nicolas Lemaître
32	DF	BEL	Thomas Foket
33	FW	FRA	Boulaye Dia

=== Out on loan ===
Note: Flags indicate national team as defined under FIFA eligibility rules; some limited exceptions apply. Players may hold more than one non-FIFA nationality.

No.	Pos.	Nation	Player
14	MF	FRA	Grégory Berthier (at Red Star until 30 June 2019)
33	FW	FRA	Steve Shamal (at Quevilly-Rouen until 30 June 2019)
—	DF	FRA	Lenny Vallier (at Pau until 30 June 2019)
—	DF	FRA	Yohan Roche (at Rodez until 30 June 2019)

No.	Pos.	Nation	Player
—	DF	CMR	Patrick Bahanack (at Ergotelis until 30 June 2019)
—	MF	FRA	Aly Ndom (at Caen until 30 June 2019)
—	FW	FRA	Andrew Jung (at Concarneau until 30 June 2019)
—	FW	FRA	Grejohn Kyei (at Lens until 30 June 2019)

=== Reserve team ===
As of 16 February 2019

Note: Flags indicate national team as defined under FIFA eligibility rules; some limited exceptions apply. Players may hold more than one non-FIFA nationality.

No.	Pos.	Nation	Player
—	GK	FRA	Ryan Bouallak
—	GK	FRA	Stevenn Leroux
—	DF	FRA	Lorenzo Diaz
—	DF	FRA	Lilian Faye
—	DF	FRA	Logan Costa
—	DF	FRA	Pierre Nouvel
—	MF	FRA	Youness Aouladzian

No.	Pos.	Nation	Player
—	MF	FRA	Dorian Samba
—	MF	FRA	Mouhamadou Drammeh
—	MF	FRA	Hamza Khida
—	MF	FRA	Maténé Diarra
—	MF	TUR	Aksel Aktas
—	FW	FRA	Scott Kyei
—	FW	FRA	Maxime Penneteau

== Competitions ==
=== Ligue 1 ===
==== League table ====
Pos	Team	Pld	W	D	L	GF	GA	GD	Pts	Qualification or relegation
6	Montpellier	38	15	14	9	53	42	+11	59	
7	Nice	38	15	11	12	30	35	−5	56	
8	Reims	38	13	16	9	39	42	−3	55	
9	Nîmes	38	15	8	15	57	58	−1	53	
10	Rennes	38	13	13	12	55	52	+3	52	Qualification to Europa League group stage (Note: Rennes qualified for the Europa League group stage by winning the 2018–19 Coupe de France.)

Source: Ligue 1 and Soccerway
Rules for classification: 1) Points; 2) Goal difference; 3) Head-to-head points; 4) Head-to-head goal difference; 5) Head-to-head goals scored; 6) Head-to-head away goals scored; 7) Goals scored; 8) Away goals scored; 9) Most goals scored in single league match; 10) Fairplay ranking.

==== Results summary ====
Overall								Home						Away					
Pld	W	D	L	GF	GA	GD	Pts	W	D	L	GF	GA	GD	W	D	L	GF	GA	GD
38	13	16	9	39	42	−3	55	8	7	4	21	18	+3	5	9	5	18	24	−6

Last updated: 24 May 2019.
Source: Competitive matches

==== Results by round ====
Round	1	2	3	4	5	6	7	8	9	10	11	12	13	14	15	16	17	18	19	20	21	22	23	24	25	26	27	28	29	30	31	32	33	34	35	36	37	38
Ground	A	H	A	H	A	H	A	H	A	H	A	H	A	H	A	H	A	H	H	A	H	A	H	A	H	A	H	A	H	A	H	A	H	A	H	A	A	H
Result	W	W	L	L	D	D	L	D	D	D	W	W	L	W	D	L	D	W	D	D	D	W	W	D	W	W	D	D	W	L	D	D	L	D	L	L	W	W
Position	10	4	6	11	10	11	14	15	17	13	9	8	9	8	9	11	11	9	11	10	10	9	7	10	7	5	6	5	6	6	6	7	7	8	9	9	9	8

Source: Results
A = Away; H = Home; W = Win; D = Draw; L = Loss

==== Matches ====
Win Draw Loss

11 August 2018 1	Nice	0–1	Reims	Nice
20:00 CEST (UTC+2)	Cyprien (yellow card) 89'	Report	Doumbia 2', (yellow card) 23'; Cafaro (yellow card) 82'	Stadium: Allianz Riviera; Attendance: 21,372; Referee: Johan Hamel

17 August 2018 2	Reims	1–0	Lyon	Reims
20:45 CEST (UTC+2)	Chavarría 32'; Chavalerin (yellow card) 84'; Suk Hyun-jun (yellow card) 90+1'	Report		Stadium: Stade Auguste Delaune; Attendance: 18,917; Referee: Ruddy Buquet

25 August 2018 3	Amiens	4–1	Reims	Amiens
20:00 CEST (UTC+2)	Gnahoré 22'; Zungu (yellow card) 45'; Ghoddos 58'; Konaté 67', 73'	Report	Martin (yellow card) 10'; Métanire (red card) 36'; Cafaro 84'	Stadium: Stade de la Licorne; Attendance: 10,709; Referee: Florent Batta

1 September 2018 4	Reims	0–1	Montpellier	Reims
20:00 CEST (UTC+2)		Report	Oyongo 77'	Stadium: Stade Auguste Delaune; Attendance: 12,042; Referee: Jérémy Stinat

16 September 2018 5	Nantes	0–0	Reims	Nantes
15:00 CEST (UTC+2)	Diego (yellow card) 23'; Rongier (yellow card) 72'; Miazga (yellow card) 77'	Report	Chavarría 56'; Doumbia (yellow card) 63'; Chavalerin (yellow card) 73'; Cafaro (yellow card) 87'	Stadium: Stade de la Beaujoire; Attendance: 18,981; Referee: Eric Wattellier

22 September 2018 6	Reims	0–0	Dijon	Reims
20:00 CEST (UTC+2)	Doumbia (yellow card) 32'	Report	Abeid (yellow card) 58'	Stadium: Stade Auguste Delaune; Attendance: 11,523; Referee: Jérôme Brisard

26 September 2018 7	Paris Saint-Germain	4–1	Reims	Paris
21:00 CEST (UTC+2)	Cavani 5', 44'; Neymar 24' (pen.); Meunier 55'	Report	Chavalerin 2'; Romao (yellow card) 40'	Stadium: Parc des Princes; Attendance: 47,237; Referee: Olivier Thual

29 September 2018 8	Reims	0–0	Bordeaux	Reims
20:00 CEST (UTC+2)	Romao (yellow card) 39'; Chavalerin (yellow card) 85'	Report	Cornelius (yellow card) 41'; Tchouaméni (yellow card) 70'; Poundjé (yellow card) 90+1'	Stadium: Stade Auguste Delaune; Attendance: 13,406; Referee: Hakim Ben el Hadj

6 October 2018 9	Nîmes	0–0	Reims	Nîmes
20:00 CEST (UTC+2)	Guillaume (yellow card) 60'	Report	Ndom (yellow card) 90+3'	Stadium: Stade des Costières; Attendance: 12,958; Referee: Karim Abed

20 October 2018 10	Reims	1–1	Angers	Reims
20:00 CEST (UTC+2)	Romao (yellow card) 56'; Chavarría 73'	Report	Traoré 36'	Stadium: Stade Auguste Delaune; Attendance: 10,954; Referee: Eric Wattellier

28 October 2018 11	Rennes	0–2	Reims	Rennes
15:00 CET (UTC+1)	Sarr (yellow card) 25'; Bensebaini (yellow card) 59'; Bourigeaud (yellow card) 74'	Report	Oudin 16', 53', (yellow card) 72'; Foket (yellow card) 90+2'	Stadium: Roazhon Park; Attendance: 22,710; Referee: Benoît Millot

3 November 2018 12	Reims	1–0	Monaco	Reims
20:00 CET (UTC+1)	Cafaro 24'; Romao (red card) 50'	Report	Pelé (yellow card) 58' (yellow-red card) 71'; Grandsir (yellow card) 88'	Stadium: Stade Auguste-Delaune; Attendance: 16,005; Referee: Hakim Ben el Hadj

10 November 2018 13	Saint-Étienne	2–0	Reims	Saint-Étienne
20:00 CET (UTC+1)	Debuchy 1'; Hamouma (yellow card) 27'; Khazri 39'; Diony (yellow card) 67'; Gabriel Silva (yellow card) 80'	Report	Chavalerin (yellow card) 18'	Stadium: Stade Geoffroy-Guichard; Attendance: 22,838; Referee: Florent Batta

24 November 2018 14	Reims	2–1	Guingamp	Reims
20:00 CEST (UTC+2)	Chavalerin 2'; Romao (yellow card) 22'; Dia 68'	Report	Ikoko (yellow card) 10'; Thuram (yellow card) 34', (goal) 81' (pen.); Rebocho (yellow card) 65'; Sorbon (yellow card) 85'	Stadium: Stade Auguste Delaune; Attendance: 10,028; Referee: Johan Hamel

2 December 2018 15	Marseille	0–0	Reims	Marseille
17:00 CET (UTC+1)	Lopez (yellow card) 57'; Thauvin (yellow card) 82'	Report	Cafaro (yellow card) 61'	Stadium: Stade Vélodrome; Attendance: 41,932; Referee: Nicolas Rainville

5 December 2018 16	Reims	0–1	Toulouse	Reims
19:00 CET (UTC+1)	Romao (yellow card) 48'; Engels (yellow card) 60'; Doumbia (yellow card) 79'	Report	Gradel (yellow card) 39'; Sylla 45', (yellow card) 77'; Durmaz (yellow card) 46'; Garcia (yellow card) 78' (yellow-red card) 90+5'; Diakité (yellow card) 81'	Stadium: Stade Auguste Delaune; Attendance: 10,609; Referee: Jérémy Stinat

9 December 2018 17	Lille	1–1	Reims	Villeneuve-d'Ascq
17:00 CET (UTC+1)	José Fonte (yellow card) 72'; Pépé 90+6' (pen.)	Report	Foket (yellow card) 46'; Oudin 64'; Métanire (yellow card) 90+1'; Mendy (yellow card) 90+5'	Stadium: Stade Pierre-Mauroy; Attendance: 26,826; Referee: Willy Delajod

15 December 2018 18	Reims	2–1	Strasbourg	Reims
19:00 CET (UTC+1)	Doumbia 6'; Cafaro 66'; Romao (yellow card) 71'	Report	Thomasson 49'; Mitrović (yellow card) 76'	Stadium: Stade Auguste Delaune; Attendance: 12,171; Referee: Florent Batta

22 December 2018 19	Reims	2–2	Caen	Reims
21:00 CET (UTC+1)	Suk (yellow card) 1', (goal) 7'; Abdelhamid (yellow card) 26'; Engels 53', (yellow card) 89'	Report	Guilbert (yellow card) 16'; Ninga 28'; Crivelli 45'; Armougom (yellow card) 64'; Tchokounté (yellow card) 89'	Stadium: Stade Auguste-Delaune; Attendance: 11,017; Referee: Jérôme Miguelgorry

11 January 2019 20	Lyon	1–1	Reims	Décines-Charpieu
20:45 CET (UTC+1)	Traoré 70'	Report	Chavarría 34'; Foket (yellow card) 83'	Stadium: Parc Olympique Lyonnais; Attendance: 42,512; Referee: Benoît Millot

19 January 2019 21	Reims	1–1	Nice	Reims
20:00 CET (UTC+1)	Oudin 12'	Report	Atal (yellow card) 81'; Tameze (yellow card) 82'; Dante (yellow card) 90+5'; Walter 90+9' (pen.)	Stadium: Stade Auguste Delaune; Attendance: 11,776; Referee: Olivier Thual

26 January 2019 22	Guingamp	0–1	Reims	Guingamp
20:00 CET (UTC+1)	Coco (yellow card) 56'; Djilobodji (red card) 59'	Report	Chavalerin (yellow card) 35'; Cafaro 38'; Kamara (yellow card) 69'	Stadium: Stade de Roudourou; Attendance: 13,853; Referee: Thomas Leonard

2 February 2019 23	Reims	2–1	Marseille	Reims
21:00 CET (UTC+1)	Dingomé 21', (yellow card) 59'; Romao (yellow card) 29'; Suk 68'; Oudin (yellow card) 90+2'	Report	N'Jie 86'	Stadium: Stade Auguste Delaune; Attendance: 20,546; Referee: François Letexier

10 February 2019 24	Toulouse	1–1	Reims	Toulouse
15:00 CET (UTC+1)	Cahuzac (yellow card) 12'; Gradel 81'; Shoji (yellow card) 84'	Report	Dingomé (yellow card) 26'; Suk (yellow card) 45'; Oudin 55'; Dia (yellow card) 71'; Fontaine (yellow card) 85'	Stadium: Stadium Municipal; Attendance: 15,240; Referee: Karim Abed

17 February 2019 25	Reims	2–0	Rennes	Reims
17:00 CET (UTC+1)	Dia 3'; Oudin 68'; Chavalerin (yellow card) 86'	Report	Bensebaini (yellow card) 70'	Stadium: Stade Auguste Delaune; Attendance: 14,792; Referee: Clément Turpin

24 February 2019 26	Montpellier	2–4	Reims	Montpellier
15:00 CET (UTC+1)	Congré 6'; Laborde 55'	Report	Oudin 27', 70'; Zeneli 47' (pen.); Mendy (yellow card) 58'; Chavarría 88'	Stadium: Stade de la Mosson; Attendance: 11,124; Referee: Willy Delajod

2 March 2019 27	Reims	2–2	Amiens	Reims
20:00 CET (UTC+1)	Dia 70', (yellow card) 83'; Cafaro 84'	Report	Konaté 39' (pen.); Abdelhamid 44' (o.g.); Pieters (yellow card) 75'	Stadium: Stade Auguste Delaune; Attendance: 12,549; Referee: Frank Schneider

9 March 2019 28	Dijon	1–1	Reims	Dijon
20:00 CET (UTC+1)	Coulibaly (red card) 3'; Sliti 13' (pen.), (yellow card) 69'	Report	Zeneli 9'; Chavalerin (yellow card) 81'	Stadium: Stade Gaston Gérard; Attendance: 12,317; Referee: Florent Batta

17 March 2019 29	Reims	1–0	Nantes	Reims
15:00 CET (UTC+1)	Rahman (yellow card) 40'; Oudin 59'; Dingomé (yellow card) 61'; Doumbia (yellow card) 86'; Chavarría (yellow card) 90+2'	Report	Fábio (yellow card) 37'; Girotto (yellow card) 78' (yellow-red card) 89'	Stadium: Stade Auguste Delaune; Attendance: 14,806; Referee: Johan Hamel

3 April 2019 30	Strasbourg	4–0	Reims	Strasbourg
19:00 CEST (UTC+2)	Da Costa 45+3', 76' (pen.); Gonçalves 46', 69'; Thomasson (yellow card) 56' (yellow-red card) 88'	Report	Oudin (yellow card) 41'; Engels (yellow card) 83'; Cafaro (yellow card) 85'	Stadium: Stade de la Meinau; Attendance: 25,081; Referee: Jérémy Stinat

7 April 2019 31	Reims	1–1	Lille	Reims
15:00 CEST (UTC+2)	Romao (yellow card) 40'; Rahman (yellow card) 43'; Oudin 78'	Report	Soumaoro (yellow card) 23'; Thiago Maia (yellow card) 29'; J. Fonte 55'	Stadium: Stade Auguste Delaune; Attendance: 18,642; Referee: Jérôme Brisard

13 April 2019 32	Monaco	0–0	Reims	Monaco
20:00 CEST (UTC+2)	Subašić (yellow card) 59'; Sidibé (yellow card) 90'	Report		Stadium: Stade Louis II; Attendance: 7,094; Referee: Willy Delajod

21 April 2019 33	Reims	0–2	Saint-Étienne	Reims
17:00 CEST (UTC+2)	Foket (yellow card) 61'; Chavalerin (yellow card) 79'; Cafaro (yellow card) 90+2'	Report	Cabella 25'; Engels 51' (o.g.)	Stadium: Stade Auguste Delaune; Attendance: 19,102; Referee: Amaury Delerue

28 April 2019 34	Angers	1–1	Reims	Angers
15:00 CEST (UTC+2)	Manceau 71'	Report	Abdelhamid (yellow card) 19'; Foket (yellow card) 56'; Cafaro 63'; Rahman (yellow card) 88'	Stadium: Stade Raymond Kopa; Attendance: 11,464; Referee: Karim Abed

4 May 2019 35	Reims	0–3	Nîmes	Reims
20:00 CEST (UTC+2)	Dingomé (yellow card) 22'; Oudin (yellow card) 45+2'; Engels (yellow card) 45+2'	Report	Ferri 26'; Alakouch (yellow card) 28'; Ripart 43'; Bouanga 46'; Thioub (yellow card) 56'; Savanier (yellow card) 78'	Stadium: Stade Auguste Delaune; Attendance: 13,314; Referee: Thomas Leonard

11 May 2019 36	Caen	3–2	Reims	Caen
20:00 CEST (UTC+2)	Ninga 14'; Fajr 40'; Guilbert 45'; Zahary (yellow card) 81'	Report	Chavarría (yellow card) 13'; Doumbia 37'; Zeneli 82' (pen.); Foket (yellow card) 89'	Stadium: Stade Michel d'Ornano; Attendance: 18,339; Referee: Johan Hamel

18 May 2019 37	Bordeaux	0–1	Reims	Bordeaux
21:00 CEST (UTC+2)		Report	Suk 2'; Foket (yellow card) 90+2'	Stadium: Matmut Atlantique; Attendance: 14,247; Referee: Eric Wattellier

24 May 2019 38	Reims	3–1	Paris Saint-Germain	Reims
21:05 CEST (UTC+2)	Dingomé (yellow card) 15'; Rahman 36'; Cafaro 56'; Mendy (yellow card) 80'; Chavarría 90+5'	Report	Draxler (yellow card) 44'; Mbappé 59'	Stadium: Stade Auguste-Delaune; Attendance: 20,299; Referee: Nicolas Rainville

=== Coupe de France ===
6 January 2019 Round of 64	Reims	2–0	Lens	Reims
14:15 CET (UTC+1)	Ojo (yellow card) 22'; Oudin 32'; Cafaro 36' (pen.)	Report		Stadium: Stade Auguste Delaune; Attendance: 8,232; Referee: Frank Schneider

22 January 2019 Round of 32	Toulouse	4–4 (a.e.t.) (4–3 p)	Reims	Toulouse
18:30 CET (UTC+1)	Leya Iseka 44', 82'; Jean (yellow card) 45+2'; García 68'; Sidibé (yellow card) 79'; Sylla (yellow card) 88'; Mubele (yellow card) 108'; Gradel 119' (pen.)	Report	Dia 47'; Chavalerin (yellow card) 74', (goal) 87'; Oudin 77'; Cafaro 108'; Abdelhamid (yellow card) 111'	Stadium: Stadium Municipal; Attendance: 6,652; Referee: Clément Turpin
	Penalties
	Dossevi (penalty scored); Sylla (penalty missed); Mubele (penalty scored); Leya Iseka (penalty scored); Gradel (penalty scored)		(penalty scored) Chavarría; (penalty missed) Chavalerin; (penalty scored) Fontaine; (penalty scored) Mbemba; (penalty missed) Cafaro

=== Coupe de la Ligue ===
31 October 2018 Round of 32	Reims	1–1 (2–3 p)	Orléans	Reims
21:05 CET (UTC+1)	Ojo 88'; Chavalerin (yellow card) 90+2'	Report	Mutombo (yellow card) 42'; Lecoeuche (yellow card) 56'; Tell 61', (yellow card) 90+2'; Le Tallec (yellow card) 90'	Stadium: Stade Auguste Delaune; Attendance: 5,237; Referee: William Lavis
	Penalties
	Chavarría (penalty missed); Kamara (penalty missed); Oudin (penalty scored); Ojo (penalty scored); Fontaine (penalty missed)		(penalty scored) Lecoeuche; (penalty scored) Demoncy; (penalty scored) Tell; (penalty missed) Le Tallec; (penalty missed) Cambon
