= Marshall Munetsi =

Zimbabwean footballer (born 1996)

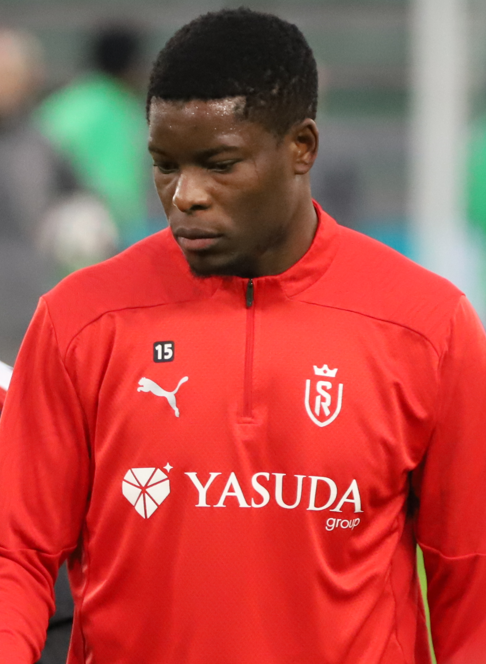
- Munetsi with Reims in 2025

Personal information
- Full name: Marshall Nyasha Munetsi
- Date of birth: 22 June 1996 (age 30)
- Place of birth: Harare, Zimbabwe
- Height: 1.88 m (6 ft 2 in)
- Position: Defensive midfielder

Team information
- Current team: Wolverhampton Wanderers
- Number: 5

Youth career
- Friendly Academy
- Blue Rangers

Senior career*
Years	Team	Apps	(Gls)
2015–2016	Ubuntu Cape Town	22	(1)
2016–2017	Baroka	26	(2)
2017–2019	Orlando Pirates	28	(0)
2019–2025	Reims	148	(21)
2025–	Wolverhampton Wanderers	38	(5)
2026	→ Paris FC (loan)	15	(4)

International career^{‡}
2018–	Zimbabwe	43	(5)
- * Club domestic league appearances and goals as of 04:43, 21 October 2026 (UTC) ‡ National team caps and goals as of 20:05, 28 September 2026 (UTC)

Marshall Nyasha Munetsi (born 22 June 1996) is a Zimbabwean professional footballer who plays as a defensive midfielder for EFL Championship club Wolverhampton Wanderers, and captains the Zimbabwe national team.

== Club career ==
=== Early career ===
Munetsi was signed by South African National First Division side Cape Town in July 2015. The team released a statement saying that he was "...in the mould of a typical Yaya Touré. Big‚ strong‚ mobile and a good passer of the ball." He made his professional debut on 26 September 2015 in a 3–1 loss to Black Leopards, and scored his first goal in a derby match against Milano United on 16 April 2016, where it ended up being the winning goal in a 1–0 game. He attended trials with the Orlando Pirates, a team in the Premier Division, in December 2015.

=== Reims ===
On 11 June 2019, Munetsi signed for Ligue 1 club Reims on a four-year deal. A year later, on 23 December 2020, he scored his first goal for the club in a 3–1 away win over Bordeaux.

=== Wolverhampton Wanderers ===
On 3 February 2025, Munetsi joined Premier League club Wolverhampton Wanderers, signing a three-and-a-half-year contract. He made his debut for the club on 9 February in a 2–0 win over Blackburn Rovers in the FA Cup. On 8 March, he scored his first goal for Wolves in a 1–1 league draw against Everton.

==== Paris FC (loan) ====
On 16 January 2026, Munetsi was loaned to Ligue 1 side Paris FC until the remainder of the season.

== International career ==
Munetsi was called up to the Zimbabwe national team in 2018, ahead of the 2019 Africa Cup of Nations in Egypt.

== Career statistics ==
=== Club ===
As of match played 20 October 2026

Appearances and goals by club, season and competition
Club	Season	League			National cup (Note: Includes Nedbank Cup, Coupe de France, FA Cup)		League cup (Note: Includes Coupe de la Ligue, EFL Cup)		Continental		Other		Total	
Club	Season	Division	Apps	Goals	Apps	Goals	Apps	Goals	Apps	Goals	Apps	Goals	Apps	Goals
Baroka	2016–17	South African Premiership	26	2	1	0	—		—		5 (Note: Two appearances in Carling Knockout Cup, three appearances in PSL playoffs)	0	32	2
Orlando Pirates	2017–18	South African Premiership	12	0	2	0	—		—		—		14	0
Orlando Pirates	2018–19	South African Premiership	16	0	0	0	—		4 (Note: Appearances in CAF Champions League)	0	3 (Note: Appearances in Carling Knockout Cup)	0	23	0
Orlando Pirates	Total		28	0	2	0	—		4	0	3	0	37	0
Reims	2019–20	Ligue 1	17	0	1	0	3	0	—		—		21	0
Reims	2020–21	Ligue 1	27	1	1	0	—		2 (Note: Appearances in UEFA Europa League)	0	—		30	1
Reims	2021–22	Ligue 1	24	5	0	0	—		—		—		24	5
Reims	2022–23	Ligue 1	34	7	2	0	—		—		—		36	7
Reims	2023–24	Ligue 1	27	4	0	0	—		—		—		27	4
Reims	2024–25	Ligue 1	19	4	2	0	—		—		—		21	4
Reims	Total		148	21	6	0	3	0	2	0	—		159	21
Wolverhampton Wanderers	2024–25	Premier League	14	2	2	0	—		—		—		16	2
Wolverhampton Wanderers	2025–26	Premier League	13	1	0	0	2	1	—		—		15	2
Wolverhampton Wanderers	2026–27	Championship	11	2	0	0	2	0	—		0	0	13	2
Wolverhampton Wanderers	Total		38	5	2	0	4	1	—		—		44	6
Paris FC (loan)	2025–26	Ligue 1	8	3	0	0	—		—		—		8	3
Career Total			248	31	11	0	7	1	6	0	8	0	280	32

=== International ===
As of 28 September 2026

Appearances and goals by national team and year
National team	Year	Apps	Goals
Zimbabwe	2018	9	0
Zimbabwe	2019	11	1
Zimbabwe	2021	3	0
Zimbabwe	2023	2	0
Zimbabwe	2024	9	0
Zimbabwe	2025	5	1
Zimbabwe	2026	4	3
Total		43	5

Scores and results list Zimbabwe's goal tally first, score column indicates score after each Munetsi goal.

List of international goals scored by Marshall Munetsi
No.	Date	Venue	Opponent	Score	Result	Competition
1	10 September 2019	National Sports Stadium, Harare, Zimbabwe	Somalia	1–0	3–1	2022 FIFA World Cup qualification
2	20 March 2025	Moses Mabhida Stadium, Durban, South Africa	Benin	1–2	2–2	2026 FIFA World Cup qualification
3	24 September 2026	Ben M'Hamed El Abdi Stadium, El Jadida, Morocco	Sierra Leone	1–2	3–2	2027 Africa Cup of Nations qualification
4	24 September 2026	Ben M'Hamed El Abdi Stadium, El Jadida, Morocco	Sierra Leone	3–2	3–2	2027 Africa Cup of Nations qualification
5	28 September 2026	National Sports Stadium, Harare, Zimbabwe	DR Congo	1–2	1–2	2027 Africa Cup of Nations qualification

== Honours ==
Reims

- Coupe de France runner-up: 2024–25

Zimbabwe

- COSAFA Cup: 2018
