= El Bilal Touré =

Malian footballer (born 2001)

Personal information
- Date of birth: 3 October 2001 (age 25)
- Place of birth: Adjamé, Ivory Coast
- Height: 1.84 m (6 ft 0 in)
- Position: Striker

Team information
- Current team: Parma (on loan from Atalanta)
- Number: 19

Youth career
- Ivoire Académie
- 2016–2020: Afrique Football Élite

Senior career*
| Years | Team | Apps | (Gls) |
| 2020 | Reims II | 2 | (2) |
| 2020–2022 | Reims | 64 | (9) |
| 2022–2023 | Almería | 21 | (7) |
| 2023– | Atalanta | 11 | (2) |
| 2024–2025 | → VfB Stuttgart (loan) | 12 | (2) |
| 2025–2026 | → Beşiktaş (loan) | 22 | (5) |
| 2026– | → Parma (loan) | 0 | (0) |

International career^{‡}
| 2019 | Mali U20 | 15 | (7) |
| 2019 | Mali U23 | 1 | (0) |
| 2020– | Mali | 30 | (9) |
- * Club domestic league appearances and goals as of 23:20, 1 July 2026 (UTC) ‡ National team caps and goals as of 9 January 2026

El Bilal Touré (born 3 October 2001) is a professional footballer who plays as a striker for Serie A club Parma, on loan from Atalanta. Born in Ivory Coast, he represents the Mali national team.

== Club career ==
=== Reims ===
On 3 January 2020, Touré signed his first professional contract with Reims. He made his professional debut in a 4–1 Ligue 1 win over Angers on 1 February 2020, and scored Reims' first goal in the game.

=== Almería ===
On 1 September 2022, Touré moved to La Liga side Almería on a six-year contract. On 26 February 2023, he scored the only goal in a 1–0 victory over Barcelona, to be his club's first ever win against the latter.

=== Atalanta ===
Touré signed for Serie A club Atalanta on 29 July 2023. His transfer fee of €30 million was the most expensive in the club's history.

==== Loan to VfB Stuttgart ====
On 23 August 2024, Touré joined Bundesliga club VfB Stuttgart on loan for the 2024–25 season with a buy option included in the deal. Later that year, on 22 October, he scored his first UEFA Champions League goal in the stoppage time, securing a 1–0 away victory over Juventus. A month later, he sustained a metatarsal fracture during international duty which would keep him side-lined for several months.

==== Loan to Beşiktaş ====
On 25 August 2025, El-Bilal joined Turkish giants Beşiktaş initially on a season-long loan.

==== Loan to Parma ====
On 7 August 2026, Touré joined fellow Serie A side Parma on a season-long loan deal.

== International career ==
Touré won the 2019 Africa U-20 Cup of Nations with the Mali U20s. He debuted with the senior Mali national team in a 3–0 friendly win over Ghana on 9 October 2020, scoring on his debut.

On 11 December 2025, Touré was called up to the Mali squad for the 2025 Africa Cup of Nations.

== Career statistics ==
=== Club ===
As of match played 15 May 2026

Appearances and goals by club, season and competition
| Club | Season | League | | | National cup (Note: Includes Coupe de France, Copa del Rey, Coppa Italia, DFB-Pokal, Turkish Cup) | | Europe | | Total | |
| Club | Season | Division | Apps | Goals | Apps | Goals | Apps | Goals | Apps | Goals |
|---|---|---|---|---|---|---|---|---|---|---|
| Reims II | 2019–20 | Championnat National 2 | 2 | 2 | — | | — | | 2 | 2 |
| Reims | 2019–20 | Ligue 1 | 7 | 3 | 0 | 0 | — | | 7 | 3 |
| Reims | 2020–21 | Ligue 1 | 33 | 4 | 1 | 0 | 2 (Note: Appearances in UEFA Europa League) | 0 | 36 | 4 |
| Reims | 2021–22 | Ligue 1 | 21 | 2 | 1 | 0 | — | | 22 | 2 |
| Reims | 2022–23 | Ligue 1 | 3 | 0 | — | | — | | 3 | 0 |
| Reims | Total | | 64 | 9 | 2 | 0 | 2 | 0 | 68 | 9 |
| Almería | 2022–23 | La Liga | 21 | 7 | 1 | 0 | — | | 22 | 7 |
| Atalanta | 2023–24 | Serie A | 11 | 2 | 2 | 0 | 4 | 1 | 17 | 3 |
| VfB Stuttgart (loan) | 2024–25 | Bundesliga | 12 | 2 | 1 | 0 | 4 (Note: Appearances in UEFA Champions League) | 1 | 17 | 3 |
| Beşiktaş (loan) | 2025–26 | Süper Lig | 22 | 5 | 4 | 1 | — | | 26 | 6 |
| Career total | | | 132 | 27 | 10 | 1 | 10 | 2 | 152 | 30 |

=== International ===
As of match played 9 January 2026

Appearances and goals by national team and year
| National team | Year | Apps | Goals |
|---|---|---|---|
| Mali | 2020 | 3 | 2 |
| Mali | 2021 | 6 | 0 |
| Mali | 2022 | 6 | 3 |
| Mali | 2024 | 8 | 4 |
| Mali | 2025 | 5 | 0 |
| Mali | 2026 | 2 | 0 |
| Total | | 30 | 9 |

Scores and results list Mali's goal tally first, score column indicates score after each Touré goal.

List of international goals scored by El Bilal Touré
| No. | Date | Venue | Opponent | Score | Result | Competition |
|---|---|---|---|---|---|---|
| 1 | 9 October 2020 | Emirhan Sport Center Stadium, Side, Turkey | Ghana | 2–0 | 3–0 | Friendly |
| 2 | 13 November 2020 | Stade du 26 Mars, Bamako, Mali | Namibia | 1–0 | 1–0 | 2021 Africa Cup of Nations qualification |
| 3 | 4 June 2022 | Stade du 26 Mars, Bamako, Mali | Congo | 2–0 | 4–0 | 2023 Africa Cup of Nations qualification |
| 4 | 4 June 2022 | Stade du 26 Mars, Bamako, Mali | Congo | 3–0 | 4–0 | 2023 Africa Cup of Nations qualification |
| 5 | 23 September 2022 | Stade du 26 Mars, Bamako, Mali | Zambia | 1–0 | 1–0 | Friendly |
| 6 | 22 March 2024 | Marrakesh Stadium, Marrakesh, Morocco | Mauritania | 2–0 | 2–0 | Friendly |
| 7 | 26 March 2024 | Marrakesh Stadium, Marrakesh, Morocco | Nigeria | 1–0 | 2–0 | Friendly |
| 8 | 11 October 2024 | Stade du 26 Mars, Bamako, Mali | Guinea-Bissau | 1–0 | 1–0 | 2025 Africa Cup of Nations qualification |
| 9 | 19 November 2024 | Stade du 26 Mars, Bamako, Mali | Eswatini | 1–0 | 6–0 | 2025 Africa Cup of Nations qualification |

== Honours ==
Atalanta

- UEFA Europa League: 2023–24

VfB Stuttgart

- DFB-Pokal: 2024–25

Mali U20

- Africa U-20 Cup of Nations: 2019
