= Moreto Cassamá =

Bissau-Guinean footballer

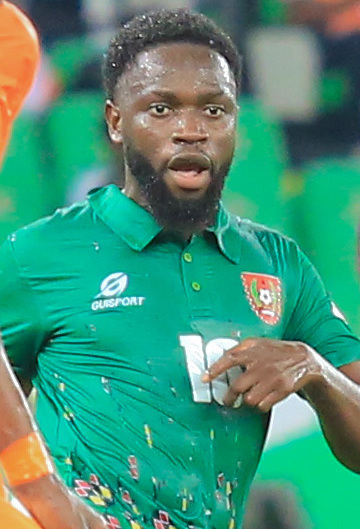
- Cassamá in 2024

Personal information
- Full name: Moreto Moro Cassamá
- Date of birth: 16 February 1998 (age 28)
- Place of birth: Bissau, Guinea-Bissau
- Height: 1.65 m (5 ft 5 in)
- Position: Midfielder

Youth career
- 2010–2013: Sporting CP
- 2013–2018: Porto

Senior career*
Years	Team	Apps	(Gls)
2017–2019	Porto B	25	(1)
2019–2020	Reims B	18	(0)
2019–2022	Reims	54	(3)
2022–2024	Omonia	38	(0)

International career^{‡}
2013–2014	Portugal U16	14	(0)
2014–2015	Portugal U17	13	(3)
2015	Portugal U18	5	(2)
2016	Portugal U19	4	(1)
2019–	Guinea-Bissau	30	(0)
- * Club domestic league appearances and goals as of 20 June 2024 ‡ National team caps and goals as of 15 November 2024

Moreto Moro Cassamá (born 16 February 1998) is a Bissau-Guinean professional footballer who plays as a midfielder. He represented Portugal internationally at junior levels before switching to Guinea-Bissau at senior level.

== Club career ==
On 16 September 2017, Cassamá made his professional debut with Porto B in a 2017–18 LigaPro match against Nacional. On the last day of the winter transfer window, 31 January 2019, he was transferred to Ligue 1 club Reims with a contract until the summer of 2022.

On 23 August 2022, Cassamá joined Cypriot club Omonia on a three-year contract. On 26 April 2023, he scored his first goal in the Cypriot Cup semi-finals against Pafos FC, helping his team reach the final, and eventually win the competition.

== International career ==
Cassamá was selected for the Guinea-Bissau national team for the 2019 Africa Cup of Nations and made his international debut in the last group stage match against Ghana on 2 July 2019, coming in as a substitute in the 64th minute for Burá.

== Career statistics ==
=== Club ===
As of match played 28 February 2024

Appearances and goals by club, season and competition
Club	Season	League			National Cup		League Cup		Continental		Other		Total	
Club	Season	Division	Apps	Goals	Apps	Goals	Apps	Goals	Apps	Goals	Apps	Goals	Apps	Goals
Porto B	2017–18	LigaPro	17	1	—		—		—		—		17	1
Porto B	2018–19	LigaPro	8	0	—		—		—		—		8	0
Porto B	Total		25	1	—		—		—		—		25	1
Reims B	2018–19	National 2	11	0	—		—		—		—		11	0
Reims B	2019–20	National 2	7	0	—		—		—		—		7	0
Reims B	Total		18	0	—		—		—		—		18	0
Reims	2018–19	Ligue 1	1	0	0	0	0	0	—		—		1	0
Reims	2019–20	Ligue 1	7	0	0	0	0	0	—		—		7	0
Reims	2020–21	Ligue 1	29	1	1	0	—		1	0	—		31	1
Reims	2021–22	Ligue 1	17	2	1	0	—		—		—		18	2
Reims	Total		54	3	2	0	0	0	1	0	—		57	3
Omonia	2022–23	Cypriot First Division	24	0	2	1	—		5	0	—		31	1
Omonia	2023–24	Cypriot First Division	14	0	1	0	—		3	0	1	0	19	0
Omonia	Total		38	0	3	1	0	0	8	0	—		50	1
Career total			135	4	5	1	0	0	9	0	1	0	150	5

=== International ===
As of match played 15 November 2024

National team	Year	Apps	Goals
Guinea-Bissau	2019	4	0
Guinea-Bissau	2020	3	0
Guinea-Bissau	2021	5	0
Guinea-Bissau	2022	6	0
Guinea-Bissau	2023	4	0
Guinea-Bissau	2024	8	0
Total		30	0

== Honours ==
Omonia

- Cypriot Cup: 2022–23
