= Arbër Zeneli =

Kosovar footballer (born 1995)

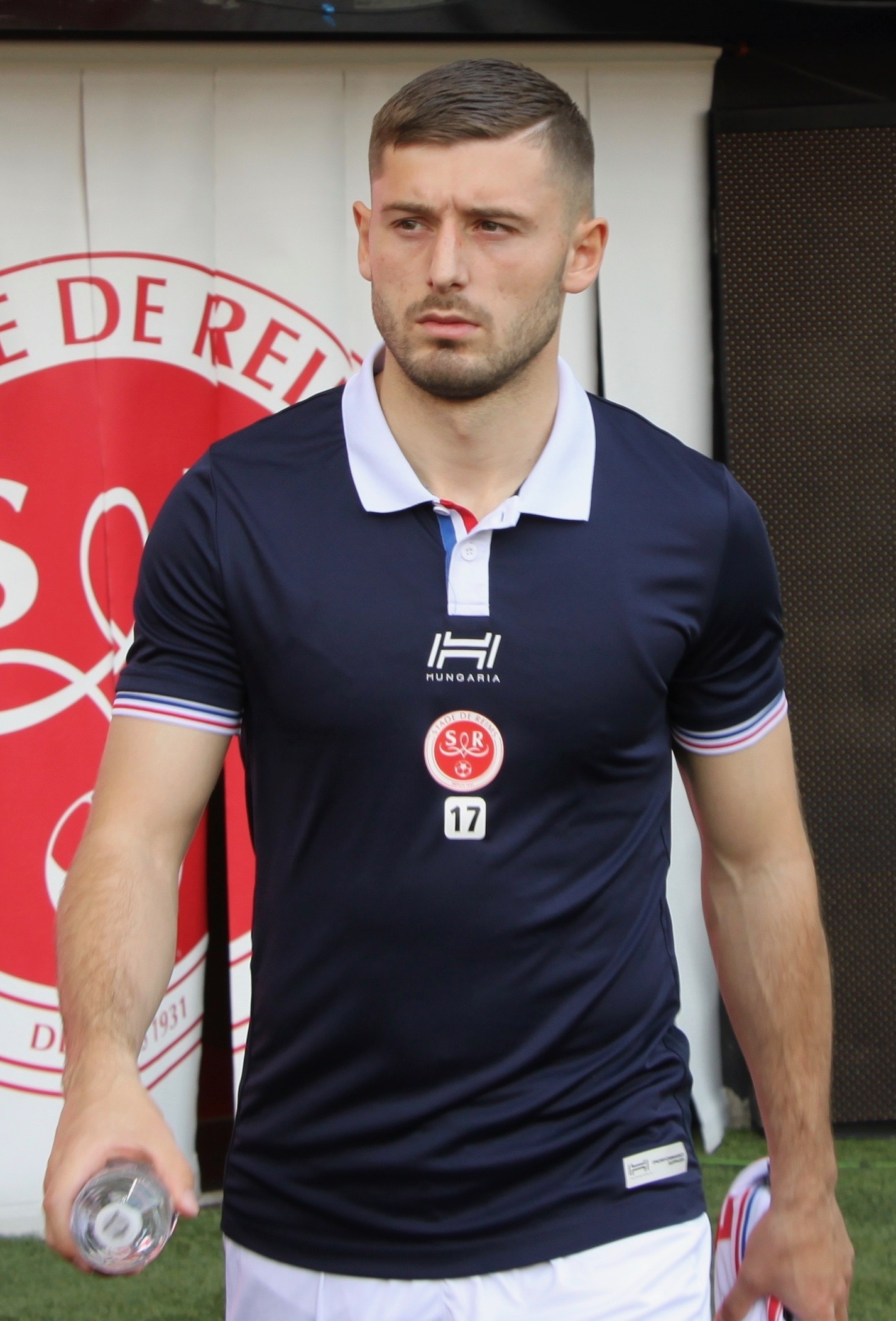
- Zeneli with Reims in 2019

Personal information
- Full name: Arbër Avni Zeneli
- Date of birth: 25 February 1995 (age 31)
- Place of birth: Säter, Sweden
- Height: 1.76 m (5 ft 9 in)
- Position: Left winger

Team information
- Current team: IF Elfsborg
- Number: 9

Youth career
- 2000–2007: Hälsinggårdens AIK
- 2007–2013: IF Elfsborg

Senior career*
Years	Team	Apps	(Gls)
2014–2015	IF Elfsborg	46	(11)
2016–2019	Heerenveen	88	(17)
2019–2023	Reims	76	(8)
2023–2024	Adana Demirspor	12	(0)
2024–	IF Elfsborg	50	(10)

International career
2010–2012	Sweden U17	7	(1)
2012–2014	Sweden U19	17	(5)
2014–2016	Sweden U21	11	(1)
2016–2023	Kosovo	33	(9)
Medal record
Men's football
Representing Sweden
UEFA European Under-21 Championship
Winner	2015 Czech Republic
- * Club domestic league appearances and goals as of 8 July 2026

Arbër Avni Zeneli (born 25 February 1995) is a professional footballer who plays as an attacking midfielder or left winger for Allsvenskan club IF Elfsborg. Born in Sweden, he represented the Kosovo national team.

Zeneli previously represented Sweden at youth level and was part of the Sweden under-21 team that won the 2015 UEFA European Under-21 Championship.

== Club career ==
=== IF Elfsborg ===
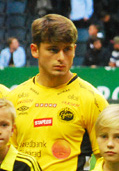
Zeneli with IF Elfsborg in 2015

==== Youth teams ====
Zeneli started playing football for Hälsinggården, but left as a 12-year old for IF Elfsborg's youth academy. On 29 October 2011, he scored a late winning goal in the final of Swedish Under-17 Championships against Brommapojkarna. The following year he helped his team reach the final in the same competition and he scored another goal, although this time IF Elfsborg lost to Malmö. On 5 November 2013, he won the Allsvenskan U21 with IF Elfsborg against Häcken after coming on as a substitute at 63rd minute in place of Arjan Mostafa.

==== First team ====
"Zeneli is one of the greatest talents I have ever seen."

— Former Premier League player and teammate Anders Svensson shares his impression of Zeneli in May 2014.

Having been promoted to the senior team in December 2013. On 1 March 2014, he made his debut with IF Elfsborg in the group stage of 2013–14 Svenska Cupen against Östersund after being named in the starting line-up and he went on to play a total of three games in the competition which IF Elfsborg later won beating Helsingborg in the final.

Zeneli made his first Allsvenskan appearance on 31 March after coming on as a substitute at 75th minute in place of injured Simon Hedlund in a 2–1 away defeat against Åtvidaberg. He played 16 games during the 2014 season and finished the season by scoring his first senior goal that subsequently sealed the win for his team against Brommapojkarna and he dedicated the goal to his former coach Klas Ingesson who had died a couple of days earlier.

=== Heerenveen ===
On 10 November 2015, Zeneli signed a three-and-a-half-year contract with Eredivisie club Heerenveen. Heerenveen reportedly paid a €2 million transfer fee. On 16 January 2016, he made his debut in a 5–2 home win against PEC Zwolle after being named in the starting line-up. On 23 January 2016, Zeneli scored his first goal for Heerenveen in a 3–1 win against Willem II in Matchday 19 of 2015–16 Eredivisie, and his performance earned him the man of the match award.

=== Reims ===
==== 2018–19 season ====
On 25 January 2019, Heerenveen announced for the contract negotiations between Zeneli and Reims. A day later, he joined Ligue 1 side Reims after agreeing to a five-year deal. Reims reportedly paid a €4 million transfer fee. On 2 February 2019, he made his debut in a 2–1 home win against Marseille after coming on as a substitute at 73rd minute in place of injured Mathieu Cafaro.

==== 2019–20 season ====
During international duties in June 2019, he tore his anterior cruciate ligament and was sidelined for most of the 2019–20 season. After returning from injury, the Ligue 1 season was suspended indefinitely and since cancelled due to the COVID-19 pandemic.

==== 2020–21 season ====
Zeneli returned to the pitch for the 2020–21 season, and made a total of 36 appearances in which he scored three goals. He also featured in the UEFA Europa League qualifiers with Reims, who were eventually knocked out by Fehérvár in the third round.

In August 2021, Zeneli tore his anterior cruciate ligament again, sidelining him for another extended period of time.

== International career ==
=== Sweden ===
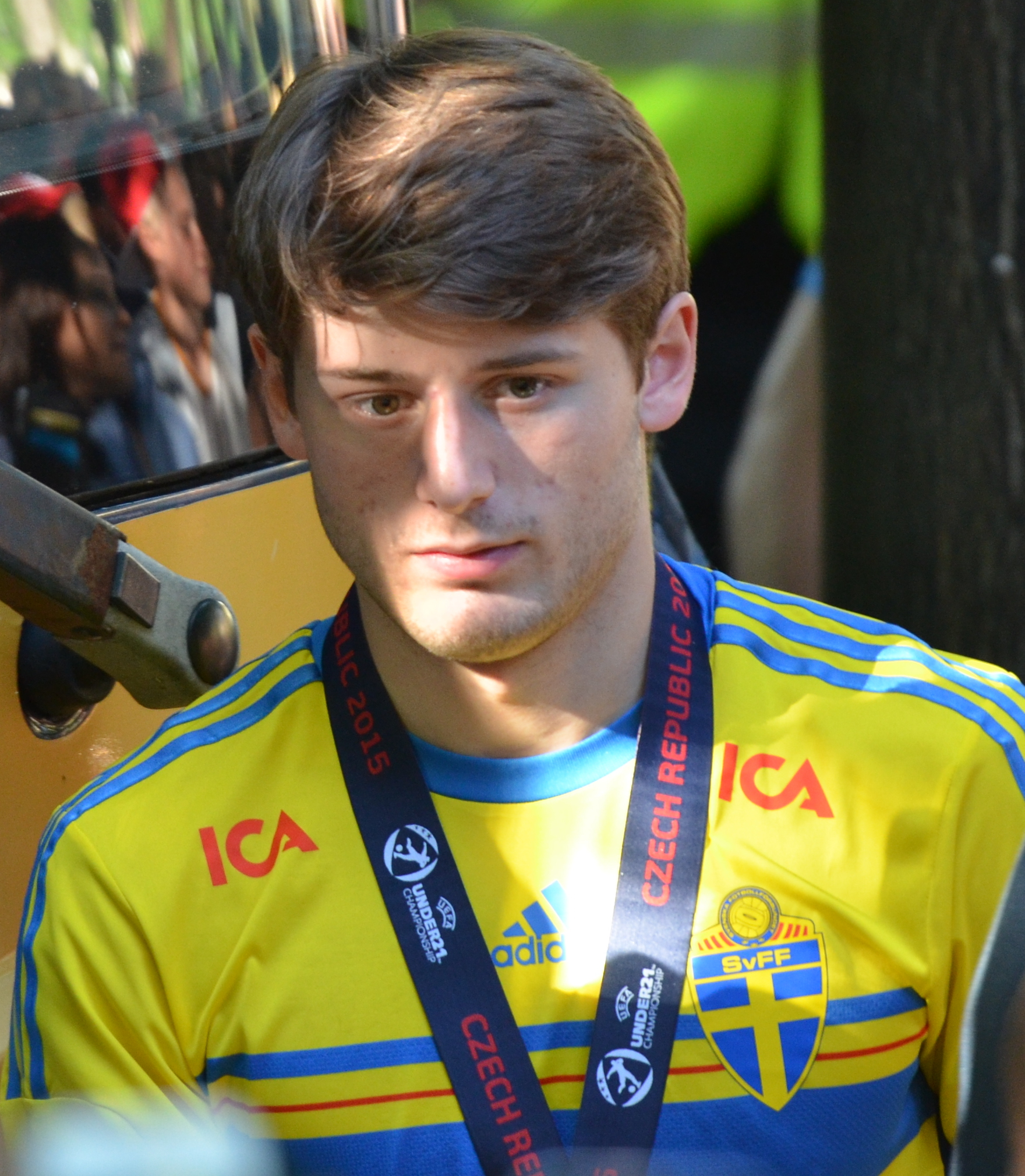
Zeneli with the Sweden under-21 team in 2015.

From 2010, until 2016, Zeneli has been part of Sweden at youth international level, respectively has been part of the U17, U19 and U21 teams and he with these teams played 35 matches and scored 7 goals. On 2 June 2015, he was named as part of the Sweden U21's 23-man squad for the 2015 UEFA European Under-21 Championship in Czech Republic, where was declared the champion even though he was an unused substitute in those matches.

=== Kosovo ===
On 24 August 2016, Zeneli decided to represent Kosovo at senior international level. On 2 October 2016, he received a call-up from Kosovo for a 2018 FIFA World Cup qualification matches against Croatia and Ukraine. On 6 October 2016, Zeneli made his debut with Kosovo in a 2018 FIFA World Cup qualification match against Croatia after being named in the starting line-up.

== Personal life ==
Zeneli was born in Säter, Sweden to Albanian parents from Selac, a village near Mitrovica, but grew up in Falun, before moving to Borås with his family when he was 11 years old. Zeneli has named his father Avni as his greatest role model in life. He is the older brother of the Swedish footballer Besfort Zeneli.

In 2022, Zeneli married Dafina Hyseni in Mitrovica.

== Career statistics ==
=== Club ===
As of match played 14 July 2024

Club	Season	League			National Cup		Continental		Total	
Club	Season	Division	Apps	Goals	Apps	Goals	Apps	Goals	Apps	Goals
IF Elfsborg	2014	Allsvenskan	16	1	4	1	1 (Note: All appearances in UEFA Europa League)	0	21	2
IF Elfsborg	2015	Allsvenskan	30	10	6	2	5	0	41	12
IF Elfsborg	Total		46	11	10	3	6	0	62	14
Heerenveen	2015–16	Eredivisie	17	4	0	0	—		17	4
Heerenveen	2016–17	Eredivisie	32	6	4	1	2	0	38	7
Heerenveen	2017–18	Eredivisie	22	4	1	2	2	0	25	6
Heerenveen	2018–19	Eredivisie	17	3	3	1	—		20	4
Heerenveen	Total		88	17	8	4	4	0	100	21
Reims	2018–19	Ligue 1	15	3	0	0	—		15	3
Reims	2019–20	Ligue 1	1	0	0	0	—		1	0
Reims	2020–21	Ligue 1	28	3	1	0	2	0	31	3
Reims	2021–22	Ligue 1	9	2	0	0	—		9	2
Reims	2022–23	Ligue 1	23	0	3	1	—		26	1
Reims	Total		76	8	4	1	2	0	82	9
Adana Demirspor	2023–24	Süper Lig	12	0	1	0	—		13	0
IF Elfsborg	2024	Allsvenskan	15	4	0	0	1	0	16	4
Career total			237	40	23	8	13	0	273	48

=== International ===
National team	Year	Apps	Goals
Kosovo	2016	3	0
Kosovo	2017	3	0
Kosovo	2018	9	6
Kosovo	2019	3	1
Kosovo	2020	4	0
Kosovo	2021	5	2
Kosovo	2022	4	0
Kosovo	2023	2	0
Total		33	9

International goals
As of 24 March 2021
Scores and results list Kosovo's goal tally first.

No.	Date	Venue	Opponent	Score	Result	Competition
1.	29 May 2018	Letzigrund, Zürich, Switzerland	Albania	1–0	3–0	Friendly
2.	29 May 2018	Letzigrund, Zürich, Switzerland	Albania	2–0	3–0	Friendly
3.	10 September 2018	Fadil Vokrri Stadium, Pristina, Kosovo	Faroe Islands	1–0	2–0	2018–19 UEFA Nations League D
4.	20 November 2018	Fadil Vokrri Stadium, Pristina, Kosovo	Azerbaijan	1–0	4–0	UEFA Euro 2020 qualification
5.	20 November 2018	Fadil Vokrri Stadium, Pristina, Kosovo	Azerbaijan	2–0	4–0	UEFA Euro 2020 qualification
6.	20 November 2018	Fadil Vokrri Stadium, Pristina, Kosovo	Azerbaijan	4–0	4–0	UEFA Euro 2020 qualification
7.	25 March 2019	Fadil Vokrri Stadium, Pristina, Kosovo	Bulgaria	1–1	1–1	UEFA Euro 2020 qualification
8.	24 March 2021	Fadil Vokrri Stadium, Pristina, Kosovo	Lithuania	1–0	4–0	Friendly
9.	24 March 2021	Fadil Vokrri Stadium, Pristina, Kosovo	Lithuania	3–0	4–0	Friendly

== Honours ==
IF Elfsborg

- Svenska Cupen: 2013–14

Sweden U21

- UEFA European Under-21 Championship: 2015
