= 2010–11 Eerste Klasse =

Season of amateur football in the Netherlands

Eerste Klasse
- Season: 2010–11
- Relegated: 2011–12 Tweede Klasse

2010–11 Eerste Klasse was a Dutch association football season of the Eerste Klasse.

Saturday champions were:

- A: VV DOVO
- B: Sportlust '46
- C: Achilles Veen
- D: VV Bennekom
- E: SV Urk

Sunday champions were:

- A: Koninklijke HFC
- B: RKAVV
- C: RKSV Nuenen
- D: RKSV Groene Ster
- E: Longa '30
- F: DIO Groningen
