= Boulaye Dia =

Footballer (born 1996)

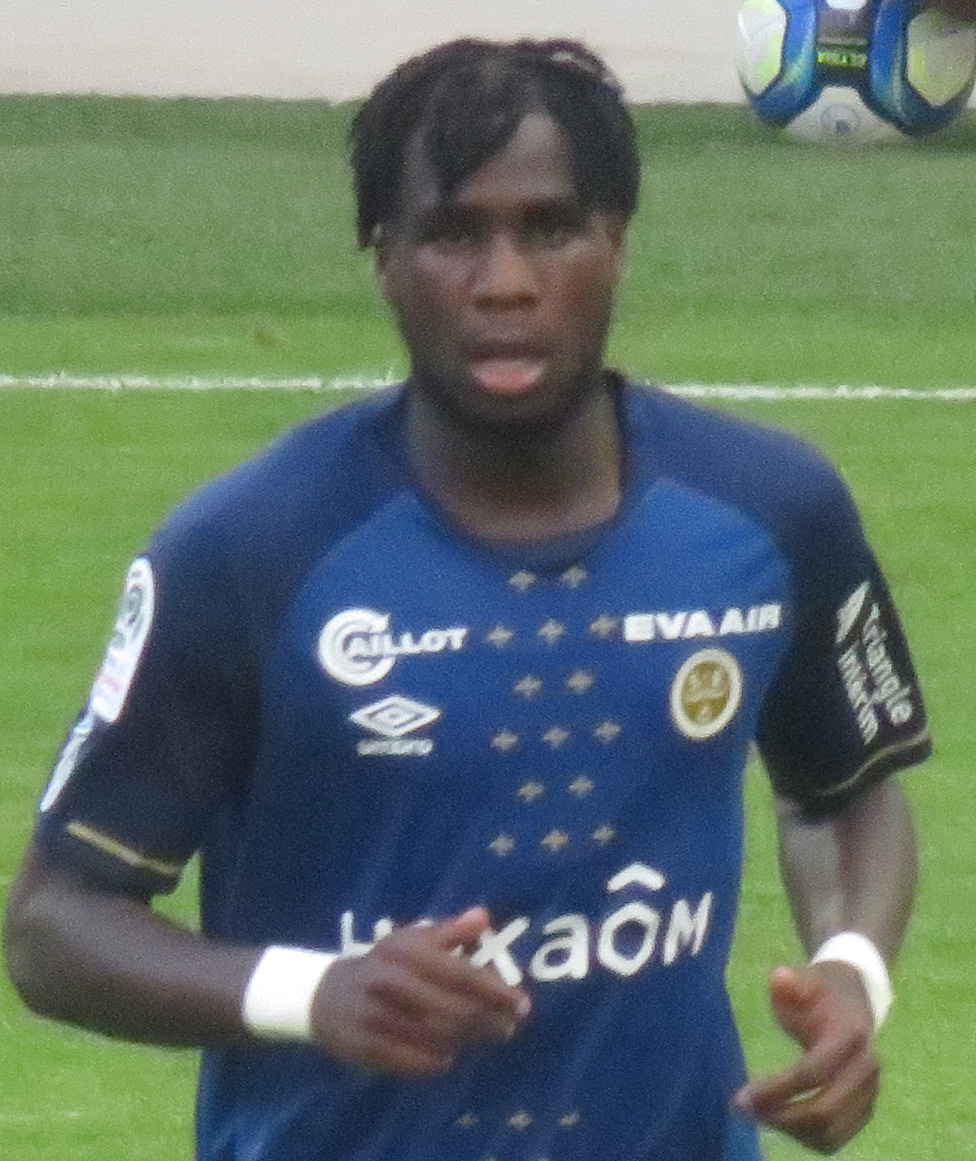
- Dia with Reims in 2019

Personal information
- Full name: Boulaye Dia
- Date of birth: 16 November 1996 (age 29)
- Place of birth: Oyonnax, France
- Height: 1.80 m (5 ft 11 in)
- Position: Forward

Team information
- Current team: Rennes (on loan from Lazio)
- Number: 22

Senior career*
Years	Team	Apps	(Gls)
2017–2018	Jura Sud	21	(15)
2018	Reims II	6	(2)
2018–2021	Reims	78	(24)
2021–2023	Villarreal	25	(5)
2022–2023	→ Salernitana (loan)	33	(16)
2023–2026	Salernitana	17	(4)
2024–2026	→ Lazio (loan)	62	(10)
2026–	Lazio	2	(0)
2026–	→ Rennes (loan)	1	(0)

International career^{‡}
2020–	Senegal	41	(8)
Medal record
Representing Senegal
Africa Cup of Nations
Winner	2021 Cameroon
Runner-up	2025 Morocco
- * Club domestic league appearances and goals as of 23:41, 6 September 2026 (UTC) ‡ National team caps and goals as of 20:00, 12 November 2026 (UTC)

Boulaye Dia (born 16 November 1996) is a professional footballer who plays as a forward for Ligue 1 club Rennes, on loan from Serie A club Lazio. Born in France, he plays for the Senegal national team.

== Club career ==
=== Reims ===
Dia signed a professional contract with Reims on 16 July 2018 after a successful debut season with Jara Sud, where he scored 15 goals in 21 games. He made his professional debut with Reims in a 1–1 Ligue 1 tie with Angers on 20 October 2018.

On 25 October 2020, Dia scored a hat-trick in a 4–0 win against Montpellier, thereby becoming the first Reims player to score one in the top flight since Santiago Santamaría in 1978. The win was the club's first in the league in the 2020–21 season.

=== Villarreal ===
On 13 July 2021, Villarreal announced the signing of Dia on a five-year deal from Reims. On his first official debut for Villarreal, which was against Chelsea in the 2021 UEFA Super Cup, he received lots of praise for his fine display.

==== Loan to Salernitana ====
On 18 August 2022, Dia went to Serie A club Salernitana on loan for one year, with a buyout clause.

=== Lazio ===
On 16 August 2024, Dia joined Lazio on a two-season loan, with a conditional obligation to buy.

==== Loan to Rennes ====
On 1 September 2026, Dia made a return to France, joining Rennes on loan from Lazio for the 2026–27 season with an option and conditional obligation to buy.

== International career ==
Born in France, Dia holds French and Senegalese nationalities. He was called up to represent the Senegal national team on 1 October 2020. He first played for Senegal in a friendly 3–1 loss to Morocco on 9 October 2020 and scored his first goal in a 3–1 win over Congo on 7 September 2021.

He was part of Senegal's squad for the 2021 Africa Cup of Nations; the Lions of Teranga went on to win the tournament for the first time in their history. Dia was appointed a Grand Officer of the National Order of the Lion by President of Senegal Macky Sall following the nation's victory at the tournament.

Dia started all four of Senegal's matches at the 2022 FIFA World Cup, scoring the opening goal of a 3–1 win over hosts Qatar, as the nation reached the round of 16 for the first time since its debut in 2002.

In December 2023, he was named in Senegal's squad for the postponed 2023 Africa Cup of Nations held in the Ivory Coast. However, an injury forced him to forfeit and he was replaced in the Senegalese group by Bamba Dieng.

== Career statistics ==
=== Club ===
As of match played 6 September 2026

Appearances and goals by club, season and competition
Club	Season	League			National cup (Note: Includes Coupe de France, Copa del Rey, Coppa Italia)		League cup (Note: Includes Coupe de la Ligue)		Europe		Other		Total	
Club	Season	Division	Apps	Goals	Apps	Goals	Apps	Goals	Apps	Goals	Apps	Goals	Apps	Goals
Jura Sud	2017–18	Championnat National 2	21	15	—		—		—		—		21	15
Reims II	2018–19	Championnat National 2	6	2	—		—		—		—		6	2
Reims II	2019–20	Championnat National 2	0	0	—		—		—		—		0	0
Reims II	Total		6	2	—		—		—		—		6	2
Reims	2018–19	Ligue 1	18	3	2	1	1	0	—		—		21	4
Reims	2019–20	Ligue 1	24	7	1	1	3	0	—		—		28	8
Reims	2020–21	Ligue 1	36	14	1	2	—		2 (Note: Appearances in UEFA Europa League)	0	—		39	16
Reims	Total		78	24	4	4	4	0	2	0	—		88	28
Villarreal	2021–22	La Liga	25	5	1	1	—		8 (Note: Appearances in UEFA Champions League)	1	1 (Note: Appearance in UEFA Super Cup)	0	35	7
Salernitana (loan)	2022–23	Serie A	33	16	0	0	—		—		—		33	16
Salernitana	2023–24	Serie A	17	4	1	0	—		—		—		18	4
Salernitana	2024–25	Serie B	0	0	1	2	—		—		—		1	2
Salernitana	Salernitana total		50	20	2	2	—		—		—		52	22
Lazio (loan)	2024–25	Serie A	35	9	1	0	—		12	3	—		48	12
Lazio (loan)	2025–26	Serie A	27	1	3	1	—		—		—		30	2
Lazio	2026–27	Serie A	2	0	1	0	—		—		—		3	0
Lazio	Lazio total		64	10	5	1	—		12	3	—		81	14
Rennes (loan)	2026–27	Ligue 1	1	0	0	0	—		0	0	—		1	0
Career total			245	76	12	8	4	0	22	4	1	0	284	88

=== International ===
As of match played 12 November 2026

Appearances and goals by national team and year
National team	Year	Apps	Goals
Senegal	2020	3	0
Senegal	2021	6	1
Senegal	2022	14	3
Senegal	2023	3	2
Senegal	2024	4	1
Senegal	2025	6	0
Senegal	2026	5	1
Total		41	8

Scores and results list Senegal's goal tally first. Score column indicates score after each Dia goal.

List of international goals scored by Boulaye Dia
No.	Date	Venue	Opponent	Score	Result	Competition
1.	7 September 2021	Stade Alphonse Massemba-Débat, Brazzaville, Republic of the Congo	Congo	1–0	3–1	2022 FIFA World Cup qualification
2.	29 March 2022	Diamniadio Olympic Stadium, Diamniadio, Senegal	Egypt	1–0	1–0 (a.e.t.)	2022 FIFA World Cup qualification
3.	24 September 2022	Stade de la Source, Orléans, France	Bolivia	1–0	2–0	Friendly
4.	25 November 2022	Al Thumama Stadium, Doha, Qatar	Qatar	1–0	3–1	2022 FIFA World Cup
5.	24 March 2023	Diamniadio Olympic Stadium, Diamniadio, Senegal	Mozambique	4–0	5–1	2023 Africa Cup of Nations qualification
6.	28 March 2023	Estádio do Zimpeto, Maputo, Mozambique	Mozambique	1–0	1–0	2023 Africa Cup of Nations qualification
7.	11 October 2024	Diamniadio Olympic Stadium, Diamniadio, Senegal	Malawi	3–0	4–0	2025 Africa Cup of Nations qualification
8.	12 November 2026	Leopold Sédar Senghor Stadium, Dakar, Senegal	Sudan	2–1	4–1	2027 Africa Cup of Nations qualification

== Honours ==
Senegal

- Africa Cup of Nations: 2021

Individual

- Grand Officer of the National Order of the Lion: 2022
- Serie A Player of the Month: May 2023
