= Nicolas Lemaître =

French footballer (born 1997)

Personal information
- Date of birth: 12 January 1997 (age 29)
- Place of birth: Reims, France
- Height: 1.90 m (6 ft 3 in)
- Position: Goalkeeper

Team information
- Current team: Rennes
- Number: 16

Youth career
- Reims

Senior career*
Years	Team	Apps	(Gls)
2015–2021	Reims II	63	(0)
2017–2021	Reims	5	(0)
2020–2021	→ Quevilly-Rouen (loan)	27	(0)
2021–2023	Quevilly-Rouen	65	(0)
2023–2026	Troyes	39	(0)
2026–	Rennes	0	(0)
- * Club domestic league appearances and goals as of 9 May 2026

Nicolas Lemaître (born 12 January 1997) is a French professional footballer who plays as a goalkeeper for Ligue 1 club Rennes.

== Career ==
Lemaître made his debut at the professional level for Reims in a 1–0 Ligue 2 loss to Sochaux on 11 February 2017. Lemaître signed his first professional contract with Reims in June 2017.

Lemaître helped Reims win the 2017–18 Ligue 2, helping promote them to the Ligue 1 for the 2018–19 season.

In June 2020, Lemaître joined Quevilly-Rouen on a season-long loan. On 1 July 2021, the move was made permanent, and he signed a contract until 2023.

On 26 June 2026, Lemaître signed a two-year contract with Rennes.

== Career statistics ==
As of match played 17 October 2025

Appearances and goals by club, season, and competition
Club	Season	League			National cup		League cup		Other		Total	
Club	Season	Division	Apps	Goals	Apps	Goals	Apps	Goals	Apps	Goals	Apps	Goals
Reims II	2015–16	CFA 2	14	0	—		—		—		14	0
Reims II	2016–17	CFA	16	0	—		—		—		16	0
Reims II	2017–18	National 2	17	0	—		—		—		17	0
Reims II	2018–19	National 2	16	0	—		—		—		16	0
Reims II	Total		63	0	—		—		—		63	0
Reims	2014–15	Ligue 1	0	0	—		—		—		0	0
Reims	2015–16	Ligue 1	0	0	0	0	0	0	—		0	0
Reims	2016–17	Ligue 2	2	0	0	0	0	0	—		2	0
Reims	2017–18	Ligue 2	2	0	0	0	0	0	—		2	0
Reims	2018–19	Ligue 1	0	0	0	0	0	0	—		0	0
Reims	2019–20	Ligue 1	1	0	1	0	1	0	—		3	0
Reims	Total		5	0	1	0	1	0	—		7	0
Quevilly-Rouen (loan)	2020–21	National	27	0	1	0	—		—		28	0
Quevilly-Rouen	2021–22	Ligue 2	34	0	1	0	—		2	0	37	0
Quevilly-Rouen	2022–23	Ligue 2	31	0	0	0	—		—		31	0
Quevilly-Rouen	Total		92	0	2	0	—		2	0	96	0
Troyes	2023–24	Ligue 2	4	0	1	0	—		—		5	0
Troyes	2024–25	Ligue 2	25	0	4	0	—		—		29	0
Troyes	2025–26	Ligue 2	10	0	0	0	—		—		10	0
Troyes	Total		39	0	5	0	—		—		44	0
Career total			199	0	8	0	1	0	2	0	210	0

== Honours ==
Reims

- Ligue 2: 2017–18
