= Moïse Sakava =

Cameroonian footballer

Personal information
- Full name: Moïse Sakava Sangola
- Date of birth: 26 December 2000 (age 25)
- Place of birth: Mokolo, Cameroon
- Height: 1.69 m (5 ft 7 in)
- Position: Midfielder

Team information
- Current team: FC Differdange 03 (on loan from Reims)

Youth career
- 2014–2019: Coton Sport

Senior career*
Years	Team	Apps	(Gls)
2019–	Reims II	28	(6)
2020–	Reims	1	(0)
2020–	→ FC Differdange 03 (loan)	12	(1)

International career
2015	Cameroon U17	1	(0)
2018	Cameroon U20	3	(1)
- * Club domestic league appearances and goals as of 1 July 2021

Moïse Sakava Sangola (born 26 December 2000) is a Cameroonian professional footballer who plays as a midfielder for FC Differdange 03, on loan from Reims.

== Club career ==
A youth product of Coton Sport in Cameroon, Sakava signed a professional contract with Reims on 18 January 2019. He made his professional debut with Reims in a 4–0 Ligue 1 win over Montpellier on 25 October 2020.
