= Timothé Nkada =

French footballer (born 1999)

Personal information
- Full name: Timothé Ralph Olivier Nkada Zogo
- Date of birth: 20 July 1999 (age 27)
- Place of birth: Lille, France
- Height: 1.77 m (5 ft 10 in)
- Position: Forward

Team information
- Current team: Troyes (on loan from Standard Liège)
- Number: 23

Youth career
- 2006–2009: Faches-Thumesnil
- 2009–2013: Lesquin
- 2013–2014: Olympique Marcquois
- 2012–2016: Rennes

Senior career*
Years	Team	Apps	(Gls)
2016–2019	Rennes II	44	(16)
2019–2020	Reims II	7	(6)
2019–2022	Reims	8	(0)
2020–2021	→ AaB (loan)	11	(0)
2021–2022	→ Orléans (loan)	13	(0)
2022	→ Orléans II (loan)	1	(1)
2023–2024	Koper	42	(9)
2024–2025	Rodez	31	(17)
2025–	Standard Liège	31	(4)
2026–	→ Troyes (loan)	1	(0)

International career
2017	France U19	2	(1)
2019	France U20	1	(0)
- * Club domestic league appearances and goals as of 6 September 2026

Timothé Ralph Olivier Nkada Zogo (born 20 July 1999) is a French professional footballer who plays as a forward for Ligue 1 club Troyes on loan from Belgian club Standard Liège.

== Club career ==
=== Reims ===
On 8 August 2019, Nkada signed with Stade Reims after years in the reserve team of Rennes. He made his professional debut for Reims in a 2–0 Ligue 1 win over Lille OSC on 1 September 2019.

=== AaB (loan) ===
In August 2020, Nkada joined Danish Superliga club AaB on loan for the 2020–21 season. The loan spell was cut short on 2 May 2021, when the club announced that Nkada had returned to Reims.

=== Standard Liège ===
On 7 August 2025, Nkada signed a three-season contract with Standard Liège in Belgium. On 1 September 2026, Nkada moved on loan to Troyes in Ligue 1, with an option to buy.

== International career ==
Born in France, Nkada is of Cameroonian descent. He was a youth international for France.

== Honours ==
Individual

- UNFP Ligue 2 Team of the Year: 2024–25
