= 2022–23 Stade de Reims season =

Stade de Reims
2022–23 season
- President: Jean-Pierre Caillot
- Head coach: Óscar García (until 13 October); Will Still (from 13 October)
- Stadium: Stade Auguste-Delaune
- Ligue 1: 11th
- Coupe de France: Round of 16
- Top goalscorer: League: Folarin Balogun (21); All: Folarin Balogun (22)
| Home colours | Away colours | Third colours |

The 2022–23 season was the 91st season in the existence of Stade de Reims and the club's fifth consecutive season in the top flight of French football. In addition to the domestic league, Reims participated in this season's edition of the Coupe de France. The season covers the period from 1 July 2022 to 30 June 2023.

Despite a 19-match unbeaten run between October and March, they achieved only two wins in their last 11 games, ultimately finished 11th.

== Players ==
=== First-team squad ===
As of 1 February 2023.

Note: Flags indicate national team as defined under FIFA eligibility rules; some limited exceptions apply. Players may hold more than one non-FIFA nationality.

| No. | Pos. | Nation | Player |
|---|---|---|---|
| 3 | MF | MLI | Kamory Doumbia |
| 4 | DF | BEL | Maxime Busi |
| 5 | DF | MAR | Yunis Abdelhamid (captain) |
| 7 | FW | NOR | Noah Holm (on loan from Rosenborg) |
| 8 | MF | SWE | Jens Cajuste |
| 9 | FW | NED | Kaj Sierhuis |
| 10 | MF | KOS | Arbër Zeneli |
| 11 | FW | FRA | Myziane Maolida (on loan from Hertha BSC) |
| 15 | MF | ZIM | Marshall Munetsi |
| 19 | FW | NED | Mitchell van Bergen |
| 21 | MF | NED | Azor Matusiwa |
| 24 | DF | CIV | Emmanuel Agbadou |

| No. | Pos. | Nation | Player |
|---|---|---|---|
| 25 | DF | BEL | Thibault De Smet |
| 26 | MF | SEN | Dion Lopy |
| 29 | FW | USA | Folarin Balogun (on loan from Arsenal) |
| 30 | GK | FRA | Nicolas Penneteau |
| 32 | DF | BEL | Thomas Foket |
| 39 | FW | JPN | Junya Itō |
| 40 | GK | FRA | Florent Duparchy |
| 70 | MF | FRA | Alexis Flips |
| 80 | GK | SRB | Ognjen Lukić |
| 94 | GK | FRA | Yehvann Diouf |
| 96 | GK | FRA | Alexandre Olliero |

== Transfers ==
=== Loans in ===
| Date | No. | Pos. | Nat. | Player | Loaned from | On loan until | Ref. |
|---|---|---|---|---|---|---|---|
| 3 August 2022 | 26 | FW | (United States) | Folarin Balogun | (England) Arsenal | End of season | |
| 1 September 2022 | 7 | FW | (Norway) | Noah Holm | (Norway) Rosenborg | End of season | |

=== Loans out ===
| Date | No. | Pos. | Nat. | Player | Loaned to | On loan until | Ref. |
|---|---|---|---|---|---|---|---|
| 31 August 2022 | 17 | FW | (Greece) | Anastasios Donis | (Cyprus) APOEL | End of season | |
| 7 September 2022 | 14 | MF | (Kosovo) | Valon Berisha | (Australia) Melbourne City | End of season | |

== Pre-season and friendlies ==
Win Draw Loss Fixtures

| 9 July 2022 Friendly | Reims | 1–2 | Paris 13 Atletico | Bétheny, France |
| 17:00 CEST (UTC+2) | Hornby 34' (pen.) | | Cissé 66'; Etonde 80' | Stadium: Stade Louis Blériot N°1 |

| 13 July 2022 Friendly | Lommel | 1–2 | Reims | Overijse, France |
| 18:00 CEST (UTC+2) | Talvitie 4' | | Abdelhamid 64'; Adeline 75' | Stadium: Begijnhofstadion |

| 16 July 2022 Friendly | Auxerre | 0–2 | Reims | Auxerre, France |
| 18:00 CEST (UTC+2) | | | Koeberlé 4'; Agbadou 40' | Stadium: Stade Pierre-Bouillot |

| 20 July 2022 Friendly | Reims | 1–0 | Metz | Épernay, France |
| 18:00 CEST (UTC+2) | Gravillon 79' | | | Stadium: Stade Paul Chandon |

| 24 July 2022 Friendly | Reims | 0–1 | Villarreal | Reims, France |
| 19:00 CEST (UTC+2) | Locko (yellow card) 18'; Cajuste (yellow card) 50'; Kebbal (yellow card) 53' | | Dia 37'; Pino (yellow card) 90' | Stadium: Stade Auguste Delaune; Referee: Willy Delajod (France) |

| 31 July 2022 Friendly | Reims | 2–2 | Sassuolo | Reims, France |
| 20:00 CEST (UTC+2) | Van Bergen 20'; Zeneli 62' | | Ceide 64'; Raspadori 67' | Stadium: Stade Auguste-Delaune |

| 8 December 2022 Friendly | Reims | 3–0 | Sochaux | San Pedro del Pinatar, Spain |
| 16:00 CET (UTC+1) | | | | Stadium: Pinatar Arena |

| 16 December 2022 Friendly | Reims | 3–0 | Charleroi | Bétheny, France |
| 15:00 CET (UTC+1) | Balogun 37'; Adeline 60'; Zeneli 75' | Report | | Stadium: Stade Louis Blériot N°1 |

| 21 December 2022 Friendly | Reims | 1–2 | Lens | Reims, France |
| 16:00 CET (UTC+1) | | | | Stadium: Stade Auguste-Delaune II |

== Competitions ==
=== Overall record ===
| Competition | First match | Last match | Starting round | Final position | Record | | | | | | | |
| Competition | First match | Last match | Starting round | Final position | Pld | W | D | L | GF | GA | GD | Win % |
|---|---|---|---|---|---|---|---|---|---|---|---|---|
| Ligue 1 | 7 August 2022 | 3 June 2023 | Matchday 1 | 11th | 38 | 12 | 15 | 11 | 45 | 45 | +0 | 31.58 |
| Coupe de France | 8 January 2023 | 8 February 2023 | Round of 64 | Round of 16 | 3 | 2 | 0 | 1 | 11 | 3 | +8 | 66.67 |
| Total | | | | | 41 | 14 | 15 | 12 | 56 | 48 | +8 | 34.15 |

Source: Soccerway

=== Ligue 1 ===
==== League table ====
| Pos | Team | Pld | W | D | L | GF | GA | GD | Pts | Qualification or relegation |
|---|---|---|---|---|---|---|---|---|---|---|
| 9 | Nice | 38 | 15 | 13 | 10 | 48 | 37 | +11 | 58 | |
| 10 | Lorient | 38 | 15 | 10 | 13 | 52 | 53 | −1 | 55 | |
| 11 | Reims | 38 | 12 | 15 | 11 | 45 | 45 | 0 | 51 | |
| 12 | Montpellier | 38 | 15 | 5 | 18 | 65 | 62 | +3 | 50 | |
| 13 | Toulouse | 38 | 13 | 9 | 16 | 51 | 57 | −6 | 48 | Qualification for the Europa League group stage (Note: Toulouse qualified for the Europa League group stage as the 2022–23 Coupe de France winners.) |

Source: Ligue 1
Rules for classification: 1) Points; 2) Goal difference; 3) Head-to-head points; 4) Head-to-head goal difference; 5) Head-to-head goals scored; 6) Head-to-head away goals scored; 7) Goals scored; 8) Away goals scored; 9) Fair-play points (Note: Head-to-head record is used only after all the matches between the teams in question have been played).

==== Results summary ====
| Overall | | | | | | | | Home | | | | | | Away | | | | | |
| Pld | W | D | L | GF | GA | GD | Pts | W | D | L | GF | GA | GD | W | D | L | GF | GA | GD |
|---|---|---|---|---|---|---|---|---|---|---|---|---|---|---|---|---|---|---|---|
| 38 | 12 | 15 | 11 | 45 | 45 | 0 | 51 | 8 | 6 | 5 | 28 | 23 | +5 | 4 | 9 | 6 | 17 | 22 | −5 |

Source: Ligue 1

==== Results by round ====
| Round | 1 | 2 | 3 | 4 | 5 | 6 | 7 | 8 | 9 | 10 | 11 | 12 | 13 | 14 | 15 | 16 | 17 | 18 | 19 | 20 | 21 | 22 | 23 | 24 | 25 | 26 | 27 | 28 | 29 | 30 | 31 | 32 | 33 | 34 | 35 | 36 | 37 | 38 |
|---|---|---|---|---|---|---|---|---|---|---|---|---|---|---|---|---|---|---|---|---|---|---|---|---|---|---|---|---|---|---|---|---|---|---|---|---|---|---|
| Ground | A | H | A | H | A | H | A | H | A | H | A | H | A | H | A | H | A | A | H | A | H | A | H | A | H | H | A | H | A | H | A | H | A | H | A | H | A | H |
| Result | L | L | D | D | W | D | L | L | D | D | D | W | D | W | D | W | D | W | D | D | W | D | W | D | W | W | W | L | W | D | L | L | L | W | L | D | L | L |
| Position | 18 | 20 | 19 | 19 | 14 | 14 | 16 | 17 | 17 | 15 | 15 | 14 | 13 | 11 | 11 | 10 | 10 | 11 | 11 | 11 | 11 | 10 | 10 | 10 | 10 | 8 | 8 | 9 | 7 | 8 | 8 | 8 | 11 | 10 | 11 | 11 | 11 | 11 |

Source: Ligue 1
A = Away; H = Home; W = Win; D = Draw; L = Loss

==== Matches ====
The league fixtures were announced on 17 June 2022.

| 7 August 2022 1 | Marseille | 4–1 | Reims | Marseille |
| 20:45 CEST (UTC+2) | Faes 13' (o.g.); Tavares 45+1'; Gigot (yellow card) 59'; Suárez 76', 90+4' | Report | Balogun 84' | Stadium: Stade Vélodrome; Attendance: 62,738; Referee: Jérôme Brisard |

| 14 August 2022 2 | Reims | 2–4 | Clermont | Reims |
| 15:00 CEST (UTC+2) | Balogun (yellow card) 7', (goal) 30' (pen.); Doumbia 23' (pen.); Agbadou (red card) 47'; Van Bergen (yellow card) 51'; Gravillon (yellow card) 71' | Report | Ogier (yellow card) 21'; Magnin (yellow card) 29'; Gastien (yellow card) 35'; Andrić 51' (pen.), 62'; Cham 72'; Bela 77' | Stadium: Stade Auguste-Delaune; Attendance: 9,456; Referee: Johan Hamel |

| 21 August 2022 3 | Strasbourg | 1–1 | Reims | Strasbourg |
| 13:00 CEST (UTC+2) | Djiku (yellow card) 39', (goal) 45+2' | Report | Busi (yellow card) 13'; Munetsi (yellow card) 70'; Balogun 80'; Cajuste (yellow card) 87'; Faes (yellow card) 90' | Stadium: Stade de la Meinau; Attendance: 25,175; Referee: Ruddy Buquet |

| 28 August 2022 4 | Reims | 1–1 | Lyon | Reims |
| 17:05 CEST (UTC+2) | Itō 24'; Lopy (red card) 63'; Faes (yellow card) 64' | Report | Caqueret (yellow card) 48'; Dembélé 86' | Stadium: Stade Auguste-Delaune; Attendance: 14,930; Referee: Jérémy Stinat |

| 31 August 2022 5 | Angers | 2–4 | Reims | Angers |
| 19:00 CEST (UTC+2) | Boufal 59' (pen.); Hunou 67'; Thioub (yellow card) 85' | Report | Munetsi 23', (yellow card) 46'; Itō 45+1'; Busi (yellow card) 58'; Cajuste (yellow card) 64' (yellow-red card) 65'; Balogun 70' (pen.); Adeline (yellow card) 80'; Pentz (yellow card) 89'; Flips 90' | Stadium: Stade Raymond Kopa; Attendance: 6,500; Referee: Jérémie Pignard |

| 4 September 2022 6 | Reims | 1–1 | Lens | Reims |
| 15:00 CEST (UTC+2) | Gravillon (yellow card) 33'; Locko (yellow card) 46'; Balogun 72' | Report | Medina (yellow card) 45'; Gradit (yellow card) 56'; Machado (red card) 67'; Openda 82' | Stadium: Stade Auguste-Delaune; Attendance: 15,761; Referee: Eric Wattelier |

| 11 September 2022 7 | Toulouse | 1–0 | Reims | Toulouse |
| 15:00 CEST (UTC+2) | Aboukhlal 31'; Spierings (yellow card) 56'; Genreau (yellow card) 86' | Report | Flips (red card) 61'; Lopy (yellow card) 73'; Abdelhamid (yellow card) 90' | Stadium: Stadium de Toulouse; Attendance: 21,315; Referee: Stéphanie Frappart |

| 18 September 2022 8 | Reims | 0–3 | Monaco | Reims |
| 13:00 CEST (UTC+2) | Busi (yellow card) 19'; Locko (red card) 22'; Munetsi (yellow card) 38'; Lopy (yellow card) 45+1' | Report | Golovin 47'; Akliouche (yellow card) 50'; Nübel (yellow card) 84'; Minamino 87'; Ben Yedder 90' | Stadium: Stade Auguste-Delaune; Attendance: 10,000; Referee: Marc Bollengier |

| 2 October 2022 9 | Troyes | 2–2 | Reims | Troyes |
| 15:00 CEST (UTC+2) | Salmier (yellow card) 19'; Odobert 51'; Gallon (yellow card) 57'; Bruus (yellow card) 83'; Porozo 90'; Palmer-Brown (yellow card) 90+6' | Report | Balogun 12'; Itō 54', (red card) 56'; Diakité (yellow card) 90+4'; Agbadou (yellow card) 90+6' | Stadium: Stade de l'Aube; Attendance: 10,164; Referee: Benoît Millot |

| 8 October 2022 10 | Reims | 0–0 | Paris Saint-Germain | Reims |
| 21:00 CEST (UTC+2) | Munetsi (yellow card) 39'; Gravillon (yellow card) 90'; Locko (yellow card) 90+3' | Report | Ramos (yellow card) 41' (red card) 41'; Verratti (yellow card) 42'; Hakimi (yellow card) 90'; Neymar (yellow card) 90+2'; Mbappé (yellow card) 90+2' | Stadium: Stade Auguste-Delaune; Attendance: 20,543; Referee: Pierre Gaillouste |

| 15 October 2022 11 | Lorient | 0–0 | Reims | Lorient |
| 17:00 CEST (UTC+2) | Ponceau (yellow card) 22' | Report | Agbadou (yellow card) 13' (red card) 90+1'; Lopy (yellow card) 45+2' (yellow-red card) 46' | Stadium: Stade du Moustoir; Attendance: 15,776; Referee: Mathieu Vernice |

| 23 October 2022 12 | Reims | 2–1 | Auxerre | Reims |
| 15:00 CEST (UTC+2) | Locko (yellow card) 25'; Balogun 28'; Matusiwa (yellow card) 42'; Keita (yellow card) 74'; Itō 87'; Diouf (yellow card) 90+2' | Report | Niang 33' | Stadium: Stade Auguste-Delaune; Attendance: 11,411; Referee: Hakim Ben El Hadj |

| 30 October 2022 13 | Brest | 0–0 | Reims | Brest |
| 15:00 CET (UTC+1) | Slimani (yellow card) 73' | Report | Flips (yellow card) 55' | Stadium: Stade Francis-Le Blé; Attendance: 11,008; Referee: Willy Delajod |

| 6 November 2022 14 | Reims | 1–0 | Nantes | Reims |
| 15:00 CET (UTC+1) | Cajuste (yellow card) 8'; Balogun 83' (pen.) | Report | Pallois (yellow card) 30' (yellow-red card) 54'; Blas (yellow card) 58'; Moutoussamy (yellow card) 90+1' | Stadium: Stade Auguste-Delaune; Attendance: 11,477; Referee: Ruddy Buquet |

| 13 November 2022 15 | Montpellier | 1–1 | Reims | Montpellier |
| 15:00 CET (UTC+1) | Souquet (yellow card) 27'; Leroy (yellow card) 40'; Delaye 90+1' | Report | Diouf (yellow card) 24'; Cajuste (yellow card) 72'; Munetsi 87' | Stadium: Stade Auguste-Delaune; Attendance: 11,778; Referee: Florent Batta |

| 29 December 2022 16 | Reims | 3–1 | Rennes | Reims |
| 19:00 CET (UTC+1) | Balogun 6', 84', (yellow card) 83'; Itō (yellow card) 20'; Flips 22' | Report | Bourigeaud (yellow card) 42'; Theate 45+1'; Omari (yellow card) 59' | Stadium: Stade Auguste-Delaune; Attendance: 13,262; Referee: Hakim Ben El Hadj |

| 2 January 2023 17 | Lille | 1–1 | Reims | Villeneuve-d'Ascq |
| 17:00 CET (UTC+1) | David 31'; Alexsandro (yellow card) 84' | Report | Abdelhamid (yellow card) 28'; Cajuste 78' | Stadium: Stade Pierre-Mauroy; Attendance: 31,086; Referee: Eric Wattellier |

| 11 January 2023 18 | Ajaccio | 0–1 | Reims | Ajaccio |
| 19:00 CET (UTC+1) | Youssouf (yellow card) 16'; Nouri (yellow card) 19'; El Idrissy (yellow card) 70' | Report | Munetsi 3'; De Smet (yellow card) 50'; Balogun (yellow card) 70'; Adeline (yellow card) 81' | Stadium: Stade François Coty; Attendance: 6,648; Referee: Willy Delajod |

| 15 January 2023 19 | Reims | 0–0 | Nice | Reims |
| 19:00 CET (UTC+1) | Cajuste (yellow card) 51' | Report | Lotomba (yellow card) 90+5' | Stadium: Stade Auguste-Delaune; Attendance: 11,383; Referee: François Letexier |

| 29 January 2023 20 | Paris Saint-Germain | 1–1 | Reims | Paris |
| 20:45 CET (UTC+1) | Marquinhos (yellow card) 29'; Neymar 51'; Verratti (red card) 58'; Donnarumma (yellow card) 90+3' | Report | Itō (yellow card) 35'; Balogun 90+5' | Stadium: Parc des Princes; Attendance: 46,000; Referee: Ruddy Buquet |

| 1 February 2023 21 | Reims | 4–2 | Lorient | Reims |
| 19:00 CET (UTC+1) | Balogun 44' (pen.), 61', 64'; Doumbia 51'; Matusiwa (yellow card) 77' | Report | Le Fée 10'; Koné 35' | Stadium: Stade Auguste-Delaune; Attendance: 10,746; Referee: Florent Batta |

| 5 February 2023 22 | Auxerre | 0–0 | Reims | Auxerre |
| 15:00 CET (UTC+1) | Mensah (yellow card) 22'; Jubal (yellow card) 37' | Report | | Stadium: Stade de l'Abbé-Deschamps; Attendance: 14,680; Referee: Pierre Gaillouste |

| 12 February 2023 23 | Reims | 4–0 | Troyes | Reims |
| 15:00 CET (UTC+1) | Munetsi 9'; Flips (yellow card) 40'; Maolida 43'; Balogun 49'; Cajuste 81' | Report | Palmer-Brown (yellow card) 42'; Agoumé (yellow card) 56' | Stadium: Stade Auguste Delaune; Attendance: 8,115; Referee: Jérémie Pignard |

| 18 February 2023 24 | Nice | 0–0 | Reims | Nice |
| 17:00 CET (UTC+1) | Lotomba (yellow card) 45' | Report | Lopy (yellow card) 87' | Stadium: Allianz Riviera; Attendance: 18,102; Referee: Marc Bollengier |

| 26 February 2023 25 | Reims | 3–0 | Toulouse | Reims |
| 15:00 CET (UTC+1) | Itō 4'; Munetsi 7'; Abdelhamid 68' | Report | | Stadium: Stade Auguste Delaune; Attendance: 12,139; Referee: Mathieu Vernice |

| 5 March 2023 26 | Reims | 1–0 | Ajaccio | Reims |
| 15:00 CET (UTC+1) | Matusiwa (yellow card) 67'; Abdelhamid (yellow card) 90+1'; Cajuste (yellow card) 84', (goal) 90+5' | Report | Belaïli (yellow card) 58'; Barreto (yellow card) 83'; El Idrissy (yellow card) 89'; Sollacaro (yellow card) 90+6' | Stadium: Stade Auguste Delaune; Attendance: 12,855; Referee: Pierre Gaillouste |

| 12 March 2023 27 | Monaco | 0–1 | Reims | Monaco |
| 17:05 CET (UTC+1) | Sarr (yellow card) 64' | Report | Balogun 50'; Itō (yellow card) 61'; Cajuste (yellow card) 83' | Stadium: Stade Louis II; Attendance: 5,383; Referee: Thomas Léonard |

| 19 March 2023 28 | Reims | 1–2 | Marseille | Reims |
| 20:45 CET (UTC+1) | Balogun 13'; De Smet (yellow card) 14'; Agbadou (yellow card) 90+1' | Report | Guendouzi (yellow card) 14'; Sánchez 16', 29'; Malinovskyi (yellow card) 19'; Rongier (yellow card) 69' | Stadium: Stade Auguste Delaune; Attendance: 20,479; Referee: François Letexier |

| 2 April 2023 29 | Nantes | 0–3 | Reims | Nantes |
| 15:00 CEST (UTC+2) | Girotto (yellow card) 48' | Report | Cajuste (yellow card) 17'; Flips 38', 40'; Munetsi 58'; Matusiwa (yellow card) 79' | Stadium: Stade de la Beaujoire; Attendance: 26,285; Referee: Marc Bollengier |

| 9 April 2023 30 | Reims | 1–1 | Brest | Reims |
| 15:00 CEST (UTC+2) | Balogun 90+1' (pen.) | Report | Lees-Melou 6'; Lala (yellow card) 90' | Stadium: Stade Auguste Delaune; Attendance: 12,023; Referee: Benoît Millot |

| 15 April 2023 31 | Rennes | 3–0 | Reims | Rennes |
| 17:00 CEST (UTC+2) | Doku 9', 19'; Ugochukwu (yellow card) 46'; Theate 68' | Report | Munetsi (yellow card) 81'; Agbadou (yellow card) 82' | Stadium: Roazhon Park; Attendance: 27,936; Referee: Jérémy Stinat |

| 23 April 2023 32 | Reims | 0–2 | Strasbourg | Reims |
| 13:00 CEST (UTC+2) | Lopy (yellow card) 18'; Agbadou (yellow card) 75' | Report | Diallo 1', 37'; Djiku (yellow card) 26' | Stadium: Stade Auguste Delaune; Attendance: 13,737; Referee: Clément Turpin |

| 30 April 2023 33 | Clermont | 1–0 | Reims | Clermont-Ferrand |
| 15:00 CEST (UTC+2) | Kyei 4'; Wieteska (red card) 80' | Report | Balogun (yellow card) 81'; Munetsi (yellow card) 90+2' | Stadium: Stade Gabriel Montpied; Attendance: 11,446; Referee: Stéphanie Frappart |

| 6 May 2023 34 | Reims | 1–0 | Lille | Reims |
| 19:00 CEST (UTC+2) | Munetsi 21'; Abdelhamid (yellow card) 71'; Alexsandro (yellow card) 83'; Busi (yellow card) 90+4' | Report | Fonte (yellow card) 37'; Ang. Gomes (yellow card) 60' | Stadium: Stade Auguste Delaune; Attendance: 17,911; Referee: Thomas Léonard |

| 12 May 2023 35 | Lens | 2–1 | Reims | Lens |
| 21:00 CEST (UTC+2) | Danso (red card) 9'; Frankowski 39' (pen.), (yellow card) 51'; Fofana 54'; Gradit (yellow card) 63'; Samba (yellow card) 89' | Report | Balogun 22' (pen.); Abdelhamid (yellow card) 37'; Flips (yellow card) 66' | Stadium: Stade Bollaert-Delelis; Attendance: 37,701; Referee: Jérémie Pignard |

| 21 May 2023 36 | Reims | 2–2 | Angers | Reims |
| 15:00 CEST (UTC+2) | Itō 10'; Balogun 54' | Report | Šabanović 46'; Abdelli 60'; Niane (yellow card) 64'; Fofana (yellow card) 90' | Stadium: Stade Auguste Delaune; Attendance: 11,242; Referee: Florent Batta |

| 27 May 2023 37 | Lyon | 3–0 | Reims | Décines-Charpieu |
| 21:00 CEST (UTC+2) | Agbadou 1' (o.g.); Lacazette 8'; Lepenant (yellow card) 79'; Caqueret 81' | Report | Agbadou (red card) 53'; Fall (yellow card) 74' | Stadium: Parc Olympique Lyonnais; Attendance: 56,874; Referee: Jérémy Stinat |

| 3 June 2023 38 | Reims | 1–3 | Montpellier | Reims |
| 21:00 CEST (UTC+2) | Abdelhamid (yellow card) 13'; Balogun 28' | Report | Leroy (yellow card) 44'; Wahi 54', 76'; Nordin 59', (yellow card) 66' | Stadium: Stade Auguste Delaune; Attendance: 15,036; Referee: Pierre Gaillouste |

=== Coupe de France ===
| 8 January 2023 Round of 64 | FC Loon-Plage | 0–7 | Reims | Loon-Plage |
| 15:30 CET (UTC+1) | Huysman (yellow card) 43'; Bocquet (yellow card) 79' | Report | Zeneli 45+3'; Cajuste (yellow card) 50'; Sierhuis 54', 90'; Flips 69'; Adeline 77', 78'; Guitane (yellow card) 63', (goal) 89' | Stadium: Stade Marcel Rosseel; Attendance: 1,260; Referee: Thomas Léonard |

| 21 January 2023 Round of 32 | Les Herbiers VF | 0–3 | Reims | Les Herbiers |
| 18:00 CET (UTC+1) | | Report | Balogun 37' (pen.); Flips 64'; Adeline 87' | Stadium: Stade Massabielle; Attendance: 4,600; Referee: Mathieu Vernice |

| 8 February 2023 Round of 16 | Toulouse | 3–1 | Reims | Toulouse |
| 18:15 CET (UTC+1) | Diouf 23' (o.g.); Aboukhlal 35', (yellow card) 54'; Chaïbi 62'; Spierings (yellow card) 70' | Report | Lopy (yellow card) 7'; Busi (yellow card) 51'; Cajuste 89' | Stadium: Stadium de Toulouse; Attendance: 17,660; Referee: Willy Delajod |
