= Azor Matusiwa =

Dutch footballer (born 1998)

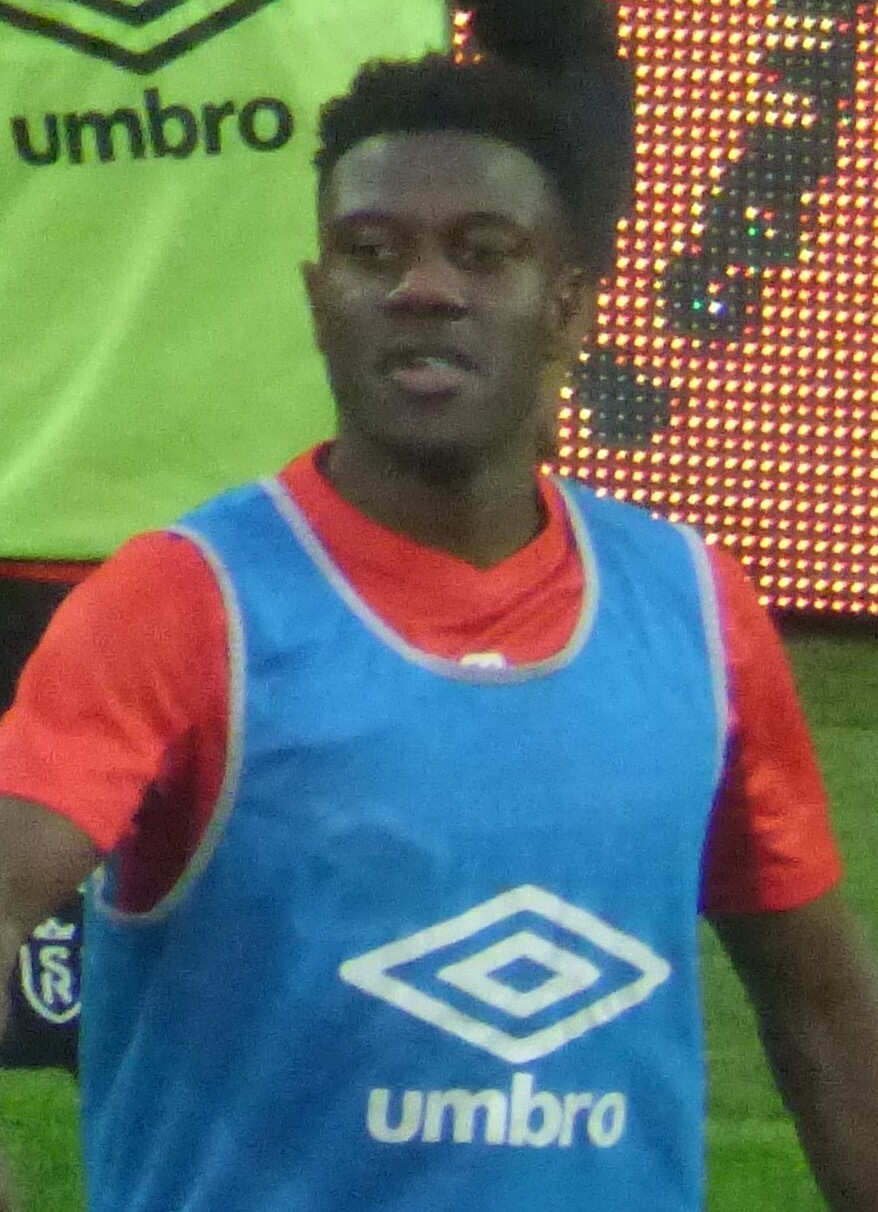
- Matusiwa warming up for Reims in 2023

Personal information
- Full name: Azor Melo Matusiwa
- Date of birth: 28 April 1998 (age 28)
- Place of birth: Hilversum, Netherlands
- Height: 1.73 m (5 ft 8 in)
- Position: Defensive midfielder

Team information
- Current team: Ipswich Town
- Number: 5

Youth career
- 2004–2011: HSV Wasmeer
- 2011–2013: Almere City
- 2013–2016: Ajax

Senior career*
| Years | Team | Apps | (Gls) |
| 2016–2019 | Jong Ajax | 30 | (0) |
| 2018–2019 | Ajax | 1 | (0) |
| 2019 | → De Graafschap (loan) | 16 | (0) |
| 2019–2021 | Groningen | 48 | (0) |
| 2021–2024 | Reims | 75 | (2) |
| 2024–2025 | Rennes | 41 | (1) |
| 2025– | Ipswich Town | 45 | (1) |

International career
| 2014 | Netherlands U16 | 8 | (0) |
| 2020–2021 | Netherlands U21 | 4 | (0) |
- * Club domestic league appearances and goals as of 22:24, 4 May 2026 (UTC)

Azor Melo Matusiwa (born 28 April 1998) is a Dutch professional footballer who plays as a defensive midfielder for Premier League club Ipswich Town.

Matusiwa began his career at Ajax, playing for the youth division. He made one appearance for Ajax at the senior level during the 2017–18 season, in the final game of the season. For his final season at Ajax, he was loaned out to De Graafschap, where he had twenty senior appearances.

At the age of twenty-one, Matusiwa signed his first senior contract for Eredivisie side FC Groningen. After two seasons, he moved to Stade de Reims in the 2021–22, where he became a regular starter. In the January 2024 transfer window, he switched to fellow Ligue 1 side, Stade Rennais. Matusiwa established himself as a regular starter for Rennes during the 2023–24 and 2024–25 seasons, playing forty-five league and cup games. He also featured in the Europa League, making two appearances for Rennes.

At the start of the 2025-26 season, Matusiwa made a first-time move to England, signing a four year-deal with newly relegated EFL Championship side Ipswich Town.

== Club career ==
=== Ajax ===
Matusiwa made his professional debut in the Eerste Divisie for Jong Ajax on 21 November 2016 in a game against Jong FC Utrecht.

On 6 May 2018, Matusiwa made his debut in the first team of Ajax, on the final matchday of the Eredivisie against Excelsior.

=== Reims ===
On 31 August 2021, he signed a five-year contract with French Ligue 1 club Reims.

=== Rennes ===
On 22 January 2024, Matusiwa signed a four-and-a-half-year contract with fellow Ligue 1 club Rennes, for a reported €16 million transfer fee.

=== Ipswich Town ===
On 13 July 2025, Matusiwa made the move to England, joining EFL Championship club Ipswich Town for an undisclosed fee, signing a four-year deal. He became the club's third summer signing, following relegation from the Premier League in the 2024-25 season. On 7 August, fellow midfielder, Jens-Lys Cajuste re-signed for Ipswich Town on a one-year loan following an initial season-long spell during the 2024–25 season - this meant for the reunification of the two players as they played together at Reims during the 2021-22 and 2022-23 seasons.

On 8 August, he made his debut for Ipswich in a 1–1 draw against Birmingham City in the league. He started, playing eighty-five minutes, before being substituted for Cameron Humphreys. He then went on to start the next two league games - a 1–1 home draw with Southampton and a 1–0 away loss to Preston North End.

On 3 March 2026, he scored his first goal for the club in a 1–0 home victory over Hull City. On 12 May 2026, the club said the player had successfully undergone an operation for a muscle injury.

== Personal life ==
Born in the Netherlands, Matusiwa is of Angolan descent.

He is the younger brother of the Angolan international footballer Diangi Matusiwa.

== Career statistics ==
As of match played 2 May 2026

Appearances and goals by club, season and competition
| Club | Season | League | | | National cup (Note: Includes KNVB Cup, Coupe de France, FA Cup) | | League cup (Note: Includes EFL Cup) | | Europe | | Other | | Total | |
| Club | Season | Division | Apps | Goals | Apps | Goals | Apps | Goals | Apps | Goals | Apps | Goals | Apps | Goals |
|---|---|---|---|---|---|---|---|---|---|---|---|---|---|---|
| Jong Ajax | 2016–17 | Eerste Divisie | 3 | 0 | — | | — | | — | | — | | 3 | 0 |
| Jong Ajax | 2017–18 | Eerste Divisie | 24 | 0 | — | | — | | — | | — | | 24 | 0 |
| Jong Ajax | 2018–19 | Eerste Divisie | 3 | 0 | — | | — | | — | | — | | 3 | 0 |
| Jong Ajax | Total | | 30 | 0 | — | | — | | — | | — | | 30 | 0 |
| Ajax | 2017–18 | Eredivisie | 1 | 0 | 0 | 0 | — | | 0 | 0 | — | | 1 | 0 |
| De Graafschap (loan) | 2018–19 | Eredivisie | 16 | 0 | 0 | 0 | — | | — | | 4 (Note: Appearances in 2018–19 Eredivisie Promotion/relegation play-offs) | 0 | 20 | 0 |
| Groningen | 2019–20 | Eredivisie | 23 | 0 | 1 | 0 | — | | — | | — | | 24 | 0 |
| Groningen | 2020–21 | Eredivisie | 23 | 0 | 1 | 0 | — | | — | | — | | 24 | 0 |
| Groningen | 2021–22 | Eredivisie | 3 | 0 | 0 | 0 | — | | — | | — | | 3 | 0 |
| Groningen | Total | | 49 | 0 | 2 | 0 | — | | — | | — | | 51 | 0 |
| Reims | 2021–22 | Ligue 1 | 29 | 1 | 1 | 0 | — | | — | | — | | 30 | 1 |
| Reims | 2022–23 | Ligue 1 | 30 | 0 | 1 | 0 | — | | — | | — | | 31 | 0 |
| Reims | 2023–24 | Ligue 1 | 16 | 1 | 1 | 0 | — | | — | | — | | 17 | 1 |
| Reims | Total | | 75 | 2 | 3 | 0 | — | | — | | — | | 78 | 2 |
| Rennes | 2023–24 | Ligue 1 | 12 | 0 | 2 | 0 | — | | 2 (Note: Appearances in UEFA Europa League) | 0 | — | | 16 | 0 |
| Rennes | 2024–25 | Ligue 1 | 29 | 1 | 2 | 0 | — | | — | | — | | 31 | 1 |
| Rennes | Total | | 41 | 1 | 4 | 0 | — | | 2 | 0 | — | | 47 | 1 |
| Ipswich Town | 2025–26 | Championship | 45 | 1 | 1 | 0 | 0 | 0 | — | | — | | 46 | 1 |
| Career total | | | 257 | 4 | 10 | 0 | 0 | 0 | 2 | 0 | 4 | 0 | 273 | 4 |

== Honours ==
Jong Ajax

- Eerste Divisie: 2017–18

Ipswich Town

- EFL Championship runner-up: 2025–26

Individual

- Ipswich Town Player of the Year: 2025–26
