= 2021–22 Stade de Reims season =

Stade de Reims
2021–22 season
- President: Jean-Pierre Caillot
- Head coach: Óscar García
- Stadium: Stade Auguste-Delaune
- Ligue 1: 12th
- Coupe de France: Round of 16
- Top goalscorer: League: Hugo Ekitike (10); All: Hugo Ekitike (11)
Home colours	Away colours	Third colours

The 2021–22 season was the 90th season in the existence of Stade de Reims and the club's fourth consecutive season in the top flight of French football. In addition to the domestic league, Reims participated in this season's edition of the Coupe de France.

== Players ==
=== First-team squad ===
As of 30 January 2022.

Note: Flags indicate national team as defined under FIFA eligibility rules; some limited exceptions apply. Players may hold more than one non-FIFA nationality.

No.	Pos.	Nation	Player
1	GK	SRB	Predrag Rajković
2	DF	BEL	Wout Faes
3	DF	CIV	Ghislain Konan
4	DF	BEL	Maxime Busi (on loan from Parma)
5	DF	MAR	Yunis Abdelhamid (captain)
6	DF	GLP	Andreaw Gravillon (on loan from Inter)
7	FW	MLI	El Bilal Touré
8	MF	SWE	Jens Cajuste
10	MF	KOS	Arbër Zeneli
11	FW	FRA	Nathanaël Mbuku
12	MF	FRA	Alexis Flips
14	MF	KOS	Valon Berisha
15	MF	ZIM	Marshall Munetsi

No.	Pos.	Nation	Player
16	GK	FRA	Yehvann Diouf
17	FW	GRE	Anastasios Donis
18	FW	SCO	Fraser Hornby
19	MF	NED	Mitchell van Bergen
20	MF	FRA	Ilan Kebbal
21	MF	NED	Azor Matusiwa
22	FW	FRA	Hugo Ekitike
23	MF	GBS	Moreto Cassamá
25	MF	MLI	Moussa Doumbia
26	MF	SEN	Dion Lopy
28	DF	FRA	Bradley Locko
30	GK	FRA	Nicolas Penneteau
32	DF	BEL	Thomas Foket

=== Out on loan ===
Note: Flags indicate national team as defined under FIFA eligibility rules; some limited exceptions apply. Players may hold more than one non-FIFA nationality.

No.	Pos.	Nation	Player
—	GK	SEN	Dialy N'Diaye (on loan to Boulogne)
—	DF	BEL	Thibault De Smet (on loan to Beerschot)
—	DF	AUT	Dario Marešić (on loan to LASK)
—	DF	SEN	Moustapha Mbow (on loan to Nîmes)
—	MF	FRA	Rafik Guitane (on loan to Marítimo)
—	DF	MLI	Fodé Doucouré (on loan to Red Star)

No.	Pos.	Nation	Player
—	MF	SUI	Dereck Kutesa (on loan to Zulte Waregem)
—	MF	CMR	Moïse Sakava (on loan to Differdange)
—	FW	FRA	Timothé Nkada (on loan to Orléans)
—	FW	NED	Kaj Sierhuis (on loan to Heracles Almelo)
—	FW	CIV	N'Dri Philippe Koffi (on loan to Paços Ferreira)

== Pre-season and friendlies ==
Win Draw Loss Fixtures

10 July 2021 Friendly	Reims	4–1	Auxerre	Reims, France
17:00 CEST (UTC+2)	Ekitike 13', 18'; Zeneli 28'; Kebbal 52'	Report	Hein 45'	Stadium: Stade Auguste-Delaune

14 July 2021 Friendly	Reims	1–0	Paris FC	Reims, France
17:00 CEST (UTC+2)	Ekitike 13'	Report		Stadium: Stade Auguste-Delaune

17 July 2021 Friendly	Valenciennes	0–1	Reims	Valenciennes, France
18:00 CEST (UTC+2)		Report	Hornby 28'	Stadium: Stade du Hainaut

21 July 2021 Friendly	Chambly	0–2	Reims	Le Touquet, France
17:00 CEST (UTC+2)		Report	Cafaro 44'; Doumbia 80'	Stadium: Stade Gérard Houllier

24 July 2021 Friendly	Reims	1–2	Lens	Boulogne-sur-Mer, France
11:00 CEST (UTC+2)	Ekitike 24'	Report	Banza 43' (pen.); Wooh 85'	Stadium: Stade de la Libération

24 July 2021 Friendly	Reims	1–1	Lens	Boulogne-sur-Mer, France
14:30 CEST (UTC+2)	Donis 56' (pen.)	Report	Cissé 20'	Stadium: Stade de la Libération

31 July 2021 Friendly	1899 Hoffenheim	3–1	Reims	Sinsheim, Germany
15:30 CEST (UTC+2)	Rudy 29'; Baumgartner 45+1'; Kramarić 68'	Report	Sierhuis 67'	Stadium: Rhein-Neckar-Arena; Attendance: 3,419

== Competitions ==
=== Overall record ===
Competition	First match	Last match	Starting round	Final position	Record							
Competition	First match	Last match	Starting round	Final position	Pld	W	D	L	GF	GA	GD	Win %
Ligue 1	8 August 2021	21 May 2022	Matchday 1	12th	38	11	13	14	43	44	−1	28.95
Coupe de France	19 December 2021	29 January 2022	Round of 64	Round of 16	3	2	1	0	3	1	+2	66.67
Total					41	13	14	14	46	45	+1	31.71

Source: Soccerway

=== Ligue 1 ===
==== League table ====
Pos	Team	Pld	W	D	L	GF	GA	GD	Pts
10	Lille	38	14	13	11	48	48	0	55
11	Brest	38	13	9	16	49	57	−8	48
12	Reims	38	11	13	14	43	44	−1	46
13	Montpellier	38	12	7	19	49	61	−12	43
14	Angers	38	10	11	17	44	55	−11	41

Source: Ligue 1
Rules for classification: 1) Points; 2) Goal difference; 3) Head-to-head points; 4) Head-to-head goal difference; 5) Head-to-head goals scored; 6) Head-to-head away goals scored; 7) Goals scored; 8) Away goals scored; 9) Fair-play points (Note: Head-to-head record is used only after all the matches between the teams in question have been played).

==== Results summary ====
Overall								Home						Away					
Pld	W	D	L	GF	GA	GD	Pts	W	D	L	GF	GA	GD	W	D	L	GF	GA	GD
38	11	13	14	43	44	−1	46	5	6	8	25	23	+2	6	7	6	18	21	−3

Source: Ligue 1

==== Results by round ====
Round	1	2	3	4	5	6	7	8	9	10	11	12	13	14	15	16	17	18	19	20	21	22	23	24	25	26	27	28	29	30	31	32	33	34	35	36	37	38
Ground	A	H	A	H	A	H	A	H	A	A	H	A	H	A	H	A	H	H	A	A	H	A	H	A	H	A	H	A	H	A	H	A	H	H	A	H	A	H
Result	D	D	D	L	W	D	L	W	L	D	L	L	D	D	W	W	L	W	D	D	L	L	W	L	D	W	D	W	D	L	L	D	W	L	W	L	W	L
Position	16	9	12	17	10	11	15	11	14	15	16	17	16	15	14	14	14	14	14	14	14	14	14	14	14	13	13	12	12	13	13	13	13	13	12	12	12	12

Source: Ligue 1
A = Away; H = Home; W = Win; D = Draw; L = Loss

==== Matches ====
The league fixtures were announced on 25 June 2021.

8 August 2021 1	Nice	0–0	Reims	Nice
15:00 CEST (UTC+2)	Todibo (yellow card) 45+1'	Report	Cafaro (yellow card) 52'	Stadium: Allianz Riviera; Attendance: 18,030; Referee: Johan Hamel

15 August 2021 2	Reims	3–3	Montpellier	Reims
15:00 CEST (UTC+2)	Cassamá 7', 26'; Cafaro (yellow card) 32'; Locko (yellow card) 49'; Kebbal 82'	Report	Cozza 5'; Thuler (yellow card) 25'; Delort 38'; Laborde 43'	Stadium: Stade Auguste-Delaune; Attendance: 8,887; Referee: Jérémy Stinat

22 August 2021 3	Metz	1–1	Reims	Metz
15:00 CEST (UTC+2)	Maïga 14'; Bronn (yellow card) 31'; Niane (yellow card) 35'; Sarr (yellow card) 36'; Vagner (yellow card) 90+3'	Report	Munetsi 7'; Foket (yellow card) 42'; Gravillon (yellow card) 60'	Stadium: Stade Saint-Symphorien; Attendance: 14,799; Referee: Florent Batta

29 August 2021 4	Reims	0–2	Paris Saint-Germain	Reims
20:45 CEST (UTC+2)	Ekitike (yellow card) 84'	Report	Mbappé 16', 64'; Verratti (yellow card) 45'; Diallo (yellow card) 55'; Paredes (yellow card) 88'	Stadium: Stade Auguste-Delaune; Attendance: 20,525; Referee: François Letexier

12 September 2021 5	Rennes	0–2	Reims	Rennes
15:00 CEST (UTC+2)	Aguerd (yellow card) 57'	Report	Ekitike 26'; Munetsi (yellow card) 60'; Koffi 66'; Gravillon (yellow card) 78'	Stadium: Roazhon Park; Attendance: 24,486; Referee: Thomas Leonard

19 September 2021 6	Reims	0–0	Lorient	Reims
15:00 CEST (UTC+2)	Munetsi (yellow card) 12'; Matusiwa (yellow card) 69'	Report	Laporte (yellow card) 75'; Abergel (yellow card) 88'; Diarra (yellow card) 90'	Stadium: Stade Auguste-Delaune; Attendance: 9,443; Referee: Hakim Ben El Hadj

22 September 2021 7	Lille	2–1	Reims	Villeneuve-d'Ascq
19:00 CEST (UTC+2)	David 31'; André 43'; Botman (yellow card) 74'; Yazıcı (yellow card) 90+2'	Report	Flips 74' (pen.); Gravillon (yellow card) 90+1'	Stadium: Stade Pierre-Mauroy; Attendance: 32,604; Referee: Johan Hamel

26 September 2021 8	Reims	3–1	Nantes	Reims
15:00 CEST (UTC+2)	Foket (yellow card) 15', (goal) 51'; Ekitike 72', 78'	Report	Simon (yellow card) 25', (goal) 62'	Stadium: Stade Auguste-Delaune; Attendance: 280; Referee: Eric Wattellier

1 October 2021 9	Lens	2–0	Reims	Lens
21:00 CEST (UTC+2)	Medina (yellow card) 26'; Danso (yellow card) 34'; Kalimuendo 45+1' (pen.), 52'; Kakuta (yellow card) 57'	Report	Ekitike (red card) 45'; Abdelhamid (yellow card) 58'	Stadium: Stade Bollaert-Delelis; Attendance: 0 Referee: Benoît Bastien

17 October 2021 10	Brest	1–1	Reims	Brest
15:00 CEST (UTC+2)	Mbock (yellow card) 11'; Faivre (yellow card) 32'; Honorat 74'; Larsonneur (yellow card) 90+1'	Report	Faes 12'; Touré (yellow card) 26'; Gravillon (yellow card) 61'; Koffi (yellow card) 66'; Van Bergen (yellow card) 90'	Stadium: Stade Francis-Le Blé; Attendance: 9,693; Referee: Jérémy Stinat

24 October 2021 11	Reims	1–2	Troyes	Reims
15:00 CEST (UTC+2)	Abdelhamid 6'; Flips (yellow card) 32'; Gravillon (yellow card) 44' (yellow-red card) 90+3'; Matusiwa (yellow card) 86'	Report	Kaboré (yellow card) 9'; Baldé 41'; Chavalerin 66'; Gallon (yellow card) 76'	Stadium: Stade Auguste Delaune; Attendance: 12,326; Referee: Pierre Gaillouste

31 October 2021 12	Bordeaux	3–2	Reims	Bordeaux
15:00 CET (UTC+1)	Medioub (yellow card) 53'; Fransérgio (yellow card) 54'; Adli 73', (yellow card) 81'; Briand 78', 90+5' (pen.)	Report	Ekitike 37'; Locko 63'; Faes (yellow card) 77'; Kebbal (yellow card) 84'	Stadium: Matmut Atlantique; Attendance: 11,020; Referee: Eric Wattellier

7 November 2021 13	Reims	0–0	Monaco	Reims
15:00 CET (UTC+1)		Report	Golovin (yellow card) 25'; Badiashile (yellow card) 57'	Stadium: Stade Auguste Delaune; Attendance: 12,080; Referee: Jérémie Pignard

21 November 2021 14	Strasbourg	1–1	Reims	Strasbourg
15:00 CET (UTC+1)	Gameiro (penalty missed) 42'; Thomasson (yellow card) 58'; Bellegarde 90+7'	Report	Ekitike 22'; Gravillon (yellow card) 38'; Matusiwa (yellow card) 43'; Flips (yellow card) 67'; Abdelhamid (yellow card) 90+5'	Stadium: Stade de la Meinau; Attendance: 24,439; Referee: Amaury Delerue

28 November 2021 15	Reims	1–0	Clermont	Reims
15:00 CET (UTC+1)	Touré (yellow card) 16'; Matusiwa (yellow card) 26'; Konan 90+1'	Report	Zedadka (yellow card) 73'; Allevinah (yellow card) 85'	Stadium: Stade Auguste Delaune; Attendance: 8,420; Referee: Benoît Bastien

1 December 2021 16	Lyon	1–2	Reims	Décines-Charpieu
21:00 CET (UTC+1)	Paquetá (yellow card) 23'; Denayer (yellow card) 49'; Toko Ekambi 66'; Dembélé (yellow card) 82'	Report	Munetsi (yellow card) 53'; Faes 56'; Abdelhamid (yellow card) 65'; Ekitike 90+2'	Stadium: Parc Olympique Lyonnais; Attendance: 0 Referee: Benoît Millot

5 December 2021 17	Reims	1–2	Angers	Reims
15:00 CET (UTC+1)	Berisha (yellow card) 27' (yellow-red card) 35'; Lopy (yellow card) 30'; Matusiwa (yellow card) 48'; Ekitike 59' (pen.)	Report	Boufal (yellow card) 33', (goal) 49' (pen.); Traoré (yellow card) 39'; Doumbia (yellow card) 57'; Fulgini 75'	Stadium: Stade Auguste Delaune; Attendance: 8,238; Referee: Johan Hamel

11 December 2021 18	Reims	2–0	Saint-Étienne	Reims
21:00 CET (UTC+1)	Touré 23' (pen.); Konan (yellow card) 53'; Faes (yellow card) 54'; Mbuku 89'	Report	Bouanga (red card) 45+1'; Maçon (yellow card) 67'; Khazri (yellow card) 79'	Stadium: Stade Auguste Delaune; Attendance: 12,019; Referee: Pierre Gaillouste

22 December 2021 19	Marseille	1–1	Reims	Marseille
21:00 CET (UTC+1)	Rongier (yellow card) 28'; Gerson (yellow card) 44'; Dieng (red card) 85'; Payet (yellow card) 85', (goal) 90+7' (pen.); Kamara (yellow card) 90+8'	Report	Ekitike 75'; Cassamá (yellow card) 81'; Abdelhamid (yellow card) 90+3'; Gravillon (yellow card) 90+6' (yellow-red card) 90+7'	Stadium: Stade Vélodrome; Attendance: 55,908; Referee: François Letexier

9 January 2022 20	Clermont	0–0	Reims	Clermont-Ferrand
15:00 CET (UTC+1)	Seidu (red card) 14'; Hamel (yellow card) 35'	Report	Locko (yellow card) 25'; Busi (yellow card) 58'; Adeline (yellow card) 78'	Stadium: Stade Gabriel Montpied; Attendance: 4,524; Referee: Florent Batta

16 January 2022 21	Reims	0–1	Metz	Reims
15:00 CET (UTC+1)	Locko (yellow card) 24'; Lopy (yellow card) 50'; Foket (yellow card) 80'; Rajković (yellow card) 85'	Report	Delaine (yellow card) 19'; Niakaté (yellow card) 28'; Pajot (yellow card) 45'; Niane 61', (yellow card) 83'	Stadium: Stade Auguste Delaune; Attendance: 3,923; Referee: Jérémie Pignard

23 January 2022 22	Paris Saint-Germain	4–0	Reims	Paris
20:45 CET (UTC+1)	Verratti 44', 67'; Ramos 62'; Pereira 75'	Report	Lopy (yellow card) 56'	Stadium: Parc des Princes; Attendance: 5,000; Referee: Eric Wattellier

6 February 2022 23	Reims	5–0	Bordeaux	Reims
15:00 CET (UTC+1)	Ekitike (penalty missed) 40', 40'; Munetsi 46', 76'; Matusiwa 59'; Faes 63'	Report	Hwang (yellow card) 39'; Ihnatenko (red card) 72'	Stadium: Stade Auguste-Delaune; Attendance: 8,858; Referee: Antony Gautier

13 February 2022 24	Nantes	1–0	Reims	Nantes
15:00 CET (UTC+1)	Simon 17'; Girotto (yellow card) 53'	Report	Abdelhamid (red card) 14'	Stadium: Stade de la Beaujoire; Attendance: 14,304; Referee: Johan Hamel

20 February 2022 25	Reims	1–1	Brest	Reims
15:00 CET (UTC+1)	Faes 4'; Mbuku (yellow card) 65'	Report	Satriano 34'; Belaïli (penalty missed) 53', (yellow card) 57'; Lasne (yellow card) 87'	Stadium: Stade Auguste-Delaune; Attendance: 9,307; Referee: Hakim Ben El Hadj

27 February 2022 26	Monaco	1–2	Reims	Monaco
13:00 CET (UTC+1)	Disasi (yellow card) 25'; Ben Yedder 55'; Jean Lucas (yellow card) 86' (yellow-red card) 88'	Report	Hornby (yellow card) 27'; Munetsi (yellow card) 42'; Volland 85' (o.g.); Mbuku 90+2'	Stadium: Stade Louis II; Attendance: 3,982; Referee: Benoît Millot

6 March 2022 27	Reims	1–1	Strasbourg	Reims
15:00 CET (UTC+1)	Cajuste 84'	Report	Sissoko (yellow card) 64'; Bellegarde 69'; Guilbert (yellow card) 90+2'	Stadium: Stade Auguste-Delaune; Attendance: 10,405; Referee: Jérémie Pignard

13 March 2022 28	Angers	0–1	Reims	Angers
15:00 CET (UTC+1)	Manceau (yellow card) 49' (yellow-red card) 90'; Mangani (yellow card) 72'; Ebosse (yellow card) 77'; Capelle (yellow card) 87'; Thomas (yellow card) 88'	Report	Munetsi (yellow card) 18'; Flips 24'; Donis (red card) 34'; Foket (yellow card) 58'	Stadium: Stade Raymond Kopa; Attendance: 5,960; Referee: Mikael Lesage

20 March 2022 29	Reims	0–0	Lyon	Reims
17:05 CET (UTC+1)		Report	Caqueret (yellow card) 27'; Henrique (yellow card) 45+2'; Toko Ekambi (yellow card) 79'	Stadium: Stade Auguste-Delaune; Attendance: 14,091; Referee: Johan Hamel

3 April 2022 30	Troyes	1–0	Reims	Troyes
15:00 CEST (UTC+2)	Palmer-Brown (yellow card) 74'; Ripart 90+3'	Report	Abdelhamid (yellow card) 9'; Matusiwa (yellow card) 35' (yellow-red card) 54'; Busi (yellow card) 80'	Stadium: Stade de l'Aube; Attendance: 9,402; Referee: Ruddy Buquet

9 April 2022 31	Reims	2–3	Rennes	Reims
17:00 CEST (UTC+2)	Munetsi (yellow card) 43'; Busi 60', (yellow card) 68'; Doumbia (penalty missed) 78'; Cajuste 80' (pen.)	Report	Bourigeaud 39', 43'; Terrier 58'	Stadium: Stade Auguste-Delaune; Attendance: 10,243; Referee: Romain Lissorgue

17 April 2022 32	Montpellier	0–0	Reims	Montpellier
15:00 CEST (UTC+2)		Report	Munetsi (yellow card) 60'; Foket (yellow card) 70'; Rajković (yellow card) 87'	Stadium: Stade de la Mosson; Attendance: 10,170; Referee: Antony Gautier

20 April 2022 33	Reims	2–1	Lille	Reims
19:00 CEST (UTC+2)	Munetsi 32'; Lopy (yellow card) 76'; Abdelhamid 90+2'	Report	Sanches 57'; Çelik (yellow card) 89'	Stadium: Stade Auguste-Delaune; Attendance: 10,910; Referee: Hakim Ben El Hadj

24 April 2022 34	Reims	0–1	Marseille	Reims
20:45 CEST (UTC+2)	Locko (yellow card) 28'	Report	Peres (yellow card) 5'; Gerson 83'	Stadium: Stade Auguste-Delaune; Attendance: 20,335; Referee: Jérôme Brisard

1 May 2022 35	Lorient	1–2	Reims	Lorient
15:00 CEST (UTC+2)	Monconduit (yellow card) 22'; Moffi 32'; Abergel (yellow card) 74'	Report	Zeneli 17'; Doumbia (yellow card) 57'; Touré 59'	Stadium: Stade du Moustoir; Attendance: 12,216; Referee: Pierre Gaillouste

8 May 2022 36	Reims	1–2	Lens	Reims
15:00 CEST (UTC+2)	Zeneli 28'; Matusiwa (yellow card) 61'	Report	Sotoca 56'; Medina (yellow card) 72'; Fofana 90+1', (yellow card) 90+2'	Stadium: Stade Auguste-Delaune; Attendance: 16,962; Referee: Vítor Ferreira

14 May 2022 37	Saint-Étienne	1–2	Reims	Saint-Étienne
21:00 CEST (UTC+2)	Mangala (yellow card) 8', (goal) 12'	Report	Munetsi 2'; Doumbia 61'	Stadium: Stade Geoffroy-Guichard; Attendance: 0 Referee: Clément Turpin

21 May 2022 38	Reims	2–3	Nice	Reims
21:00 CEST (UTC+2)	Ekitike 9'; Doumbia 17'	Report	Dante (yellow card) 25'; Delort 75' (pen.), 77', 82'; Brahimi (yellow card) 90+2'	Stadium: Stade Auguste-Delaune; Attendance: 12,589; Referee: Eric Wattellier

=== Coupe de France ===
19 December 2021 Round of 64	EF Reims Sainte-Anne Châtillons	0–1	Reims	Reims
16:00 CET (UTC+1)	Merbah (yellow card) 45+1'; Fournier (yellow card) 59'	Report	Abdelhamid (yellow card) 74'; Adeline 89'; Locko (yellow card) 90+1'	Stadium: Stade Auguste Delaune; Attendance: 6,067; Referee: Jérôme Brisard

2 January 2022 Round of 32	ES Thaon	0–1	Reims	Capavenir-Vosges
18:30 CET (UTC+1)	Rother (yellow card) 67'; Alves (yellow card) 82'	Report	Mbow (yellow card) 21'; Ekitike (red card) 66'; Hornby 90+3'	Stadium: Stade Robert Sayer; Attendance: 2,500; Referee: Clément Turpin

29 January 2022 Round of 16	Reims	1–1 (3–5 p)	Bastia	Reims
18:30 CET (UTC+1)	Kebbal (yellow card) 27'; Ekitike 37'	Report	Salles-Lamonge (yellow card) 26', (goal) 71'; Schur (yellow card) 58'	Stadium: Stade Auguste-Delaune; Attendance: 5,000; Referee: Stéphanie Frappart
	Penalties
	Ekitike (penalty scored); Hornby (penalty scored); Gravillon (penalty missed); Mbuku (penalty scored)		(penalty scored) Taoui; (penalty scored) Bocognano; (penalty scored) Vincent; (penalty scored) Magri; (penalty scored) Santelli

== Awards ==
=== Stade de Reims Player of the Year ===
Season	Player	Ref
2021–22	(Belgium) Wout Faes	

=== Stade de Reims Player of the Month ===
Month	Player	Ref.
August	(Algeria) Ilan Kebbal	
September	(France) Hugo Ekitike	
October	(Algeria) Ilan Kebbal	
November	(France) Hugo Ekitike	
December	(France) Hugo Ekitike	
January	(France) Hugo Ekitike	
February	(Belgium) Wout Faes	
March	(Belgium) Wout Faes	
April	(Belgium) Maxime Busi	
May	(Mali) Kamory Doumbia	
