= Folarin Balogun =

Professional soccer player (born 2001)

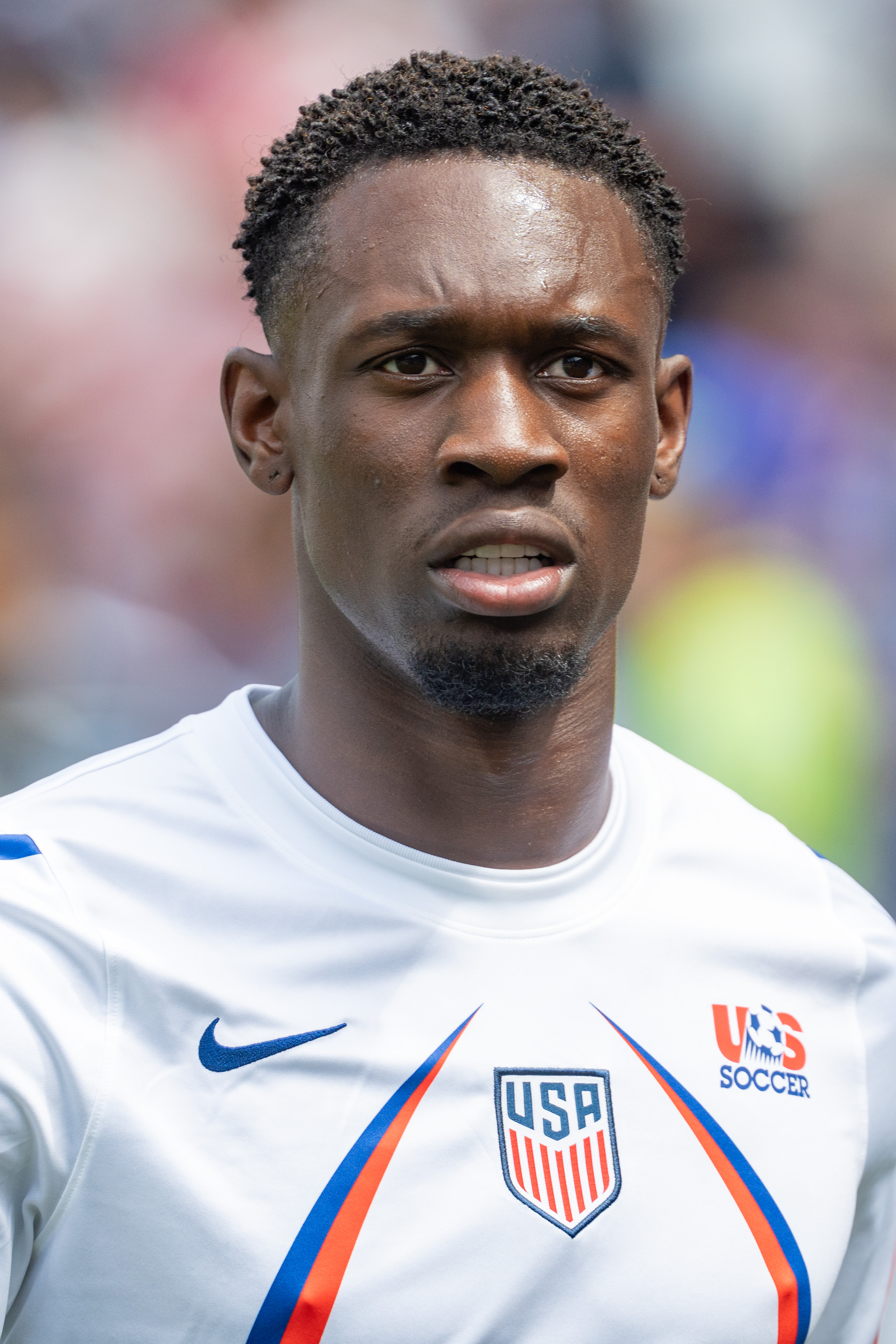
- Balogun with the United States in 2026

Personal information
- Full name: Folarin Jerry Balogun
- Date of birth: July 3, 2001 (age 25)
- Place of birth: Brooklyn, New York, U.S.
- Height: 5 ft 10 in (1.78 m)
- Position: Striker

Team information
- Current team: Monaco
- Number: 9

Youth career
- Aldersbrook
- 2008–2020: Arsenal

Senior career*
| Years | Team | Apps | (Gls) |
| 2020–2023 | Arsenal | 2 | (0) |
| 2022 | → Middlesbrough (loan) | 18 | (3) |
| 2022–2023 | → Reims (loan) | 37 | (21) |
| 2023– | Monaco | 76 | (24) |

International career^{‡}
| 2018 | England U17 | 4 | (0) |
| 2018 | United States U18 | 4 | (2) |
| 2018–2019 | England U18 | 10 | (3) |
| 2020 | England U20 | 1 | (0) |
| 2021–2022 | England U21 | 13 | (7) |
| 2023– | United States | 33 | (13) |
Medal record
Representing United States
Men's soccer
CONCACAF Nations League
| Winner | 2023 |
| Winner | 2024 |
- * Club domestic league appearances and goals as of October 25, 2026 ‡ National team caps and goals as of November 17, 2026

Folarin Jerry Balogun (born July 3, 2001) is a professional soccer player who plays as a striker for Ligue 1 club Monaco and the United States national team.

Balogun began his career at the Arsenal Academy, and was promoted to the first team in 2020. He appeared sparingly for the club, and went on loan to EFL Championship club Middlesbrough in 2022. In the following season, he made his breakthrough during a loan to Ligue 1 club Reims, where he scored 22 goals in his first season, the highest ever for an American in a top five European league. In August 2023, Balogun left Arsenal and signed for Monaco for €40 million ($43 million), where he was named the club's 2025–26 Player of the Season.

Balogun represented both the United States and England at the youth international level. In May 2023, he decided to play for the U.S. senior national team. He made his debut in June 2023, winning the 2023 CONCACAF Nations League and scoring his first goal in the final.

== Early life ==
Balogun was born in Brooklyn, New York, to Yoruba Nigerian parents. His parents were living in London, and visited New York when his mother was seven months pregnant with him. Airline staff did not allow her to board the family's return flight to London due to safety concerns over the advanced state of her pregnancy, and Balogun was subsequently born in New York. He returned to the United Kingdom with his parents when he was two months old and grew up in London.

== Club career ==
=== Arsenal ===
==== Early career ====
Balogun joined Arsenal at the age of eight, after being scouted while playing for his previous Sunday League team, Aldersbrook. Before trialling with Arsenal, he had trialled with the club's North London rivals Tottenham Hotspur and nearly signed for them.

In 2017, Balogun was an integral part of Trevor Bumstead's Arsenal U16 team that won the Liam Brady Cup, defeating Bayern Munich, Manchester United, and Juventus. He signed a professional contract in February 2019. In July 2020, after failing to agree to a new contract with Arsenal, he was linked with a transfer away from the club, including a proposed £8 million move to Brentford.

==== 2020–22: Senior team debut and loan to Middlesbrough ====
On October 29, 2020, Balogun made his senior debut in the Europa League, coming on as a substitute in the 74th minute, in a group stage match against Dundalk. On November 26, he scored his first senior goal, in a Europa League group stage match against Molde.

On April 26, 2021, Balogun signed a new long-term contract with the club. On August 13, Balogun made his Premier League debut in a 2–0 loss against newly promoted Brentford.

On January 12, 2022, he joined EFL Championship club Middlesbrough on a loan deal until the end of the season. On March 8, he scored his first goal for Boro in a 4–1 loss to Sheffield United, and later scored in back-to-back wins over Birmingham City and Peterborough United.

==== 2022–23: Loan to Reims ====
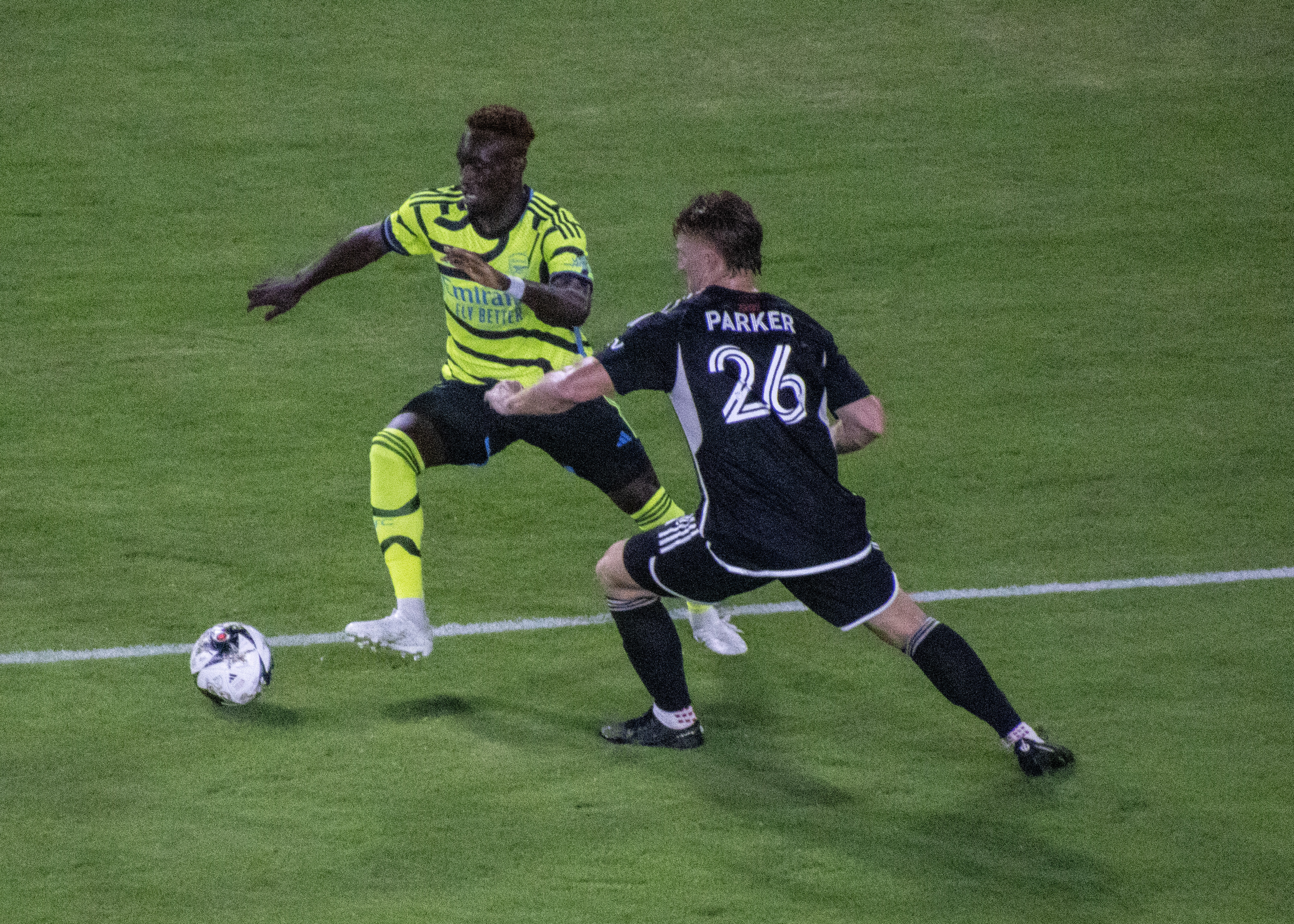
Balogun (left) playing for Arsenal at the 2023 MLS All-Star Game

In August 2022, he moved on loan to French club Reims. Balogun scored on his debut for the club on August 7, a 4–1 defeat to Marseille; fellow Arsenal loanee Nuno Tavares, also on his debut, scored for Marseille in the match. On January 29, 2023, Balogun scored a late goal in stoppage time to seal a 1–1 draw away to league leaders Paris Saint-Germain. It was his eleventh goal in Ligue 1 during the season, the most of any player aged 21 or under in Europe's top five leagues. Three days later, Balogun scored his first senior hat-trick in a 4–2 win over Lorient, his fourteenth goal of the season in Ligue 1. This made him the top scorer in Ligue 1 at that time. He finished the season with 21 goals, the fourth top scorer in the league.

Upon his return to Arsenal for the 2023–24 season, Balogun stated he would not leave the club again on loan. In August 2023, he was reported to have attracted interest from Chelsea, Inter Milan and Monaco.

=== Monaco ===
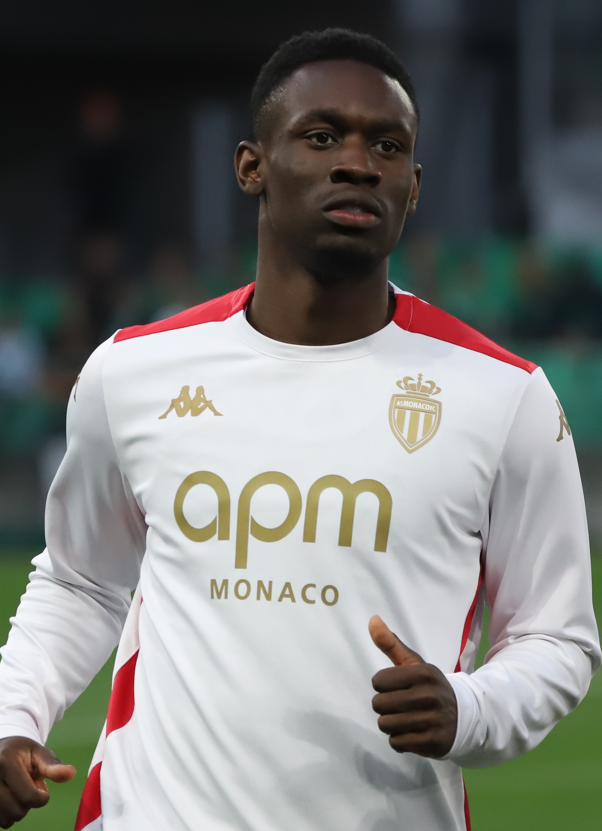
Balogun with Monaco in 2025

On August 30, 2023, Ligue 1 side Monaco announced the signing of Balogun on a five-year contract, for a reported fee of €30 million, which could rise to €40 million with add-ons. On September 2, he played his first match for Monaco, coming on against Lens. During the match, he picked up his first yellow card for simulation after trying to win a penalty. On September 17, he scored his first league goal for Monaco, three minutes after coming off the bench in a 2–2 draw to Lorient. On September 22, he had his first start at the club, in which he missed two penalties in a 1–0 defeat against Nice.

In the 2024–25 season, Balogun suffered a series of injuries which sidelined him most of the season. On May 3, 2025, he scored on his first start back from injury, a 3–1 win over Saint-Étienne.

On November 4, 2025, he scored his first Champions League goal, securing a 1–0 away win over Bodø/Glimt. On February 17, in the Champions League, Balogun scored a first-half brace against Paris Saint-Germain, though Monaco would ultimately lose 2–3. One month later, on March 6, he recorded another goal and assist against PSG, with Monaco winning 3–1 in the league matchup. Dating back to February 21, he scored in eight consecutive league games (including ten goal contributions in his last ten club games). This tied with the 2025–26 top five European league season record goalscoring streak shared only by Kylian Mbappé at Real Madrid (eight goals). Balogun's streak was also one goal away from the 21st-century Ligue 1 goalscoring streak record. Balogun finished the 2025–26 season as Monaco's top scorer with 19 goals and four assists in all competitions, and the league's fourth top scorer with 13 goals. For his season performances, he was named the 2025–26 Monaco Player of the Season.

In August 2026, Premier League club Everton made a transfer bid for Balogun. On August 31, Balogun agreed to the transfer for a reported fee of €45 million (£38.58m; $52.3m) with €5 million (£4.3m; $5.8m) in add-ons. However, on transfer deadline day, complications arose with his medical. Despite Everton renegotiating the terms and being granted a two-hour "grace period", Balogun ultimately rejected the move and opted to remain with Monaco.

== International career ==
Born in the United States to Nigerian parents, and raised in the United Kingdom, Balogun was eligible to represent the United States, England and Nigeria at international level, before he committed himself to the United States. He qualified for the United States through birthright citizenship.

=== Youth career ===
After playing for England at the under-17 level, and appearing in the 2018 UEFA European Under-17 Championship, he accepted a call up from the United States under-18 national team in August 2018 for a training camp and a tournament in the Czech Republic. He played in all four of the United States' games in the Václav Ježek Youth Tournament and scored twice. He also expressed interest in playing for Nigeria, although he stated that he enjoys England's "style of play" which was "similar to Arsenal's".

In 2019, he appeared and scored for the England under-18 national team in a tournament in Dubai. In October 2020, he made an appearance for the England under-20 against Wales.

On August 27, 2021, Balogun received his first call up to the England under-21 team. On September 7, 2021, he made his England U21 debut as a substitute during the 2–0 2023 UEFA European Under-21 Championship qualification win over Kosovo under-21s at Stadium MK.

In October 2022, he said he was open to playing for Nigeria.

=== Senior career ===
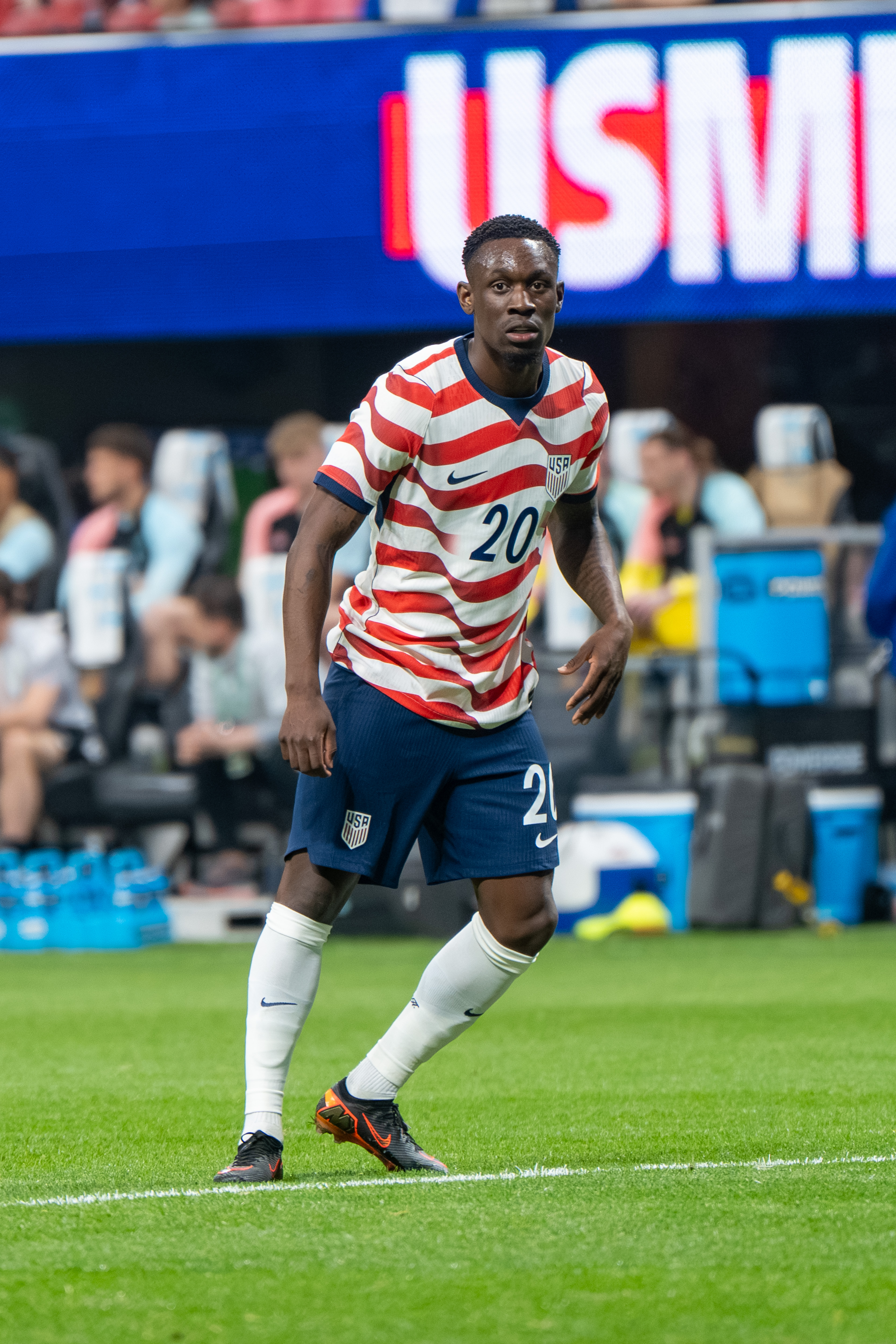
Balogun playing for the United States in 2026

On May 16, 2023, FIFA approved Balogun's application for a switch to represent the United States national team. He had been recruited by the United States through several meetings, which included watching the Orlando Magic and New York Knicks play in Florida. Although the meetings were initially kept secret, Balogun inadvertently fueled widespread speculation about his international future after posting an Instagram photo of a training pitch without disclosing its location, which U.S. supporters identified the logo of an Orlando bar in the background that was near the national team's training base. His Instagram posts were subsequently flooded with comments with U.S. flags and bald eagle emojis from American fans.

Balogun received his first call up to the United States senior squad on June 1, 2023, featuring in the squad for the 2023 CONCACAF Nations League Finals. On June 18, Balogun scored his first goal for the United States in their Nations League final victory over Canada, winning his first career trophy.

Balogun was selected to the USMNT's roster at the 2024 Copa America. In the first match, Balogun scored the United States' second goal in a 2–0 win against Bolivia, and in the second, he scored the opener in the 2–1 defeat at the hands of Panama when the U.S. was down to ten players after a red card given to Timothy Weah in the 18th minute. Despite the loss, Balogun won the Man of the Match award. Following the game, Balogun, along with teammates Weah, Chris Richards and Weston McKennie, suffered racial abuse from online trolls. Balogun's club Monaco, as well as CONCACAF, CONMEBOL and the U.S. Soccer Federation condemned the actions and fully supported the players.

==== 2026 World Cup ====
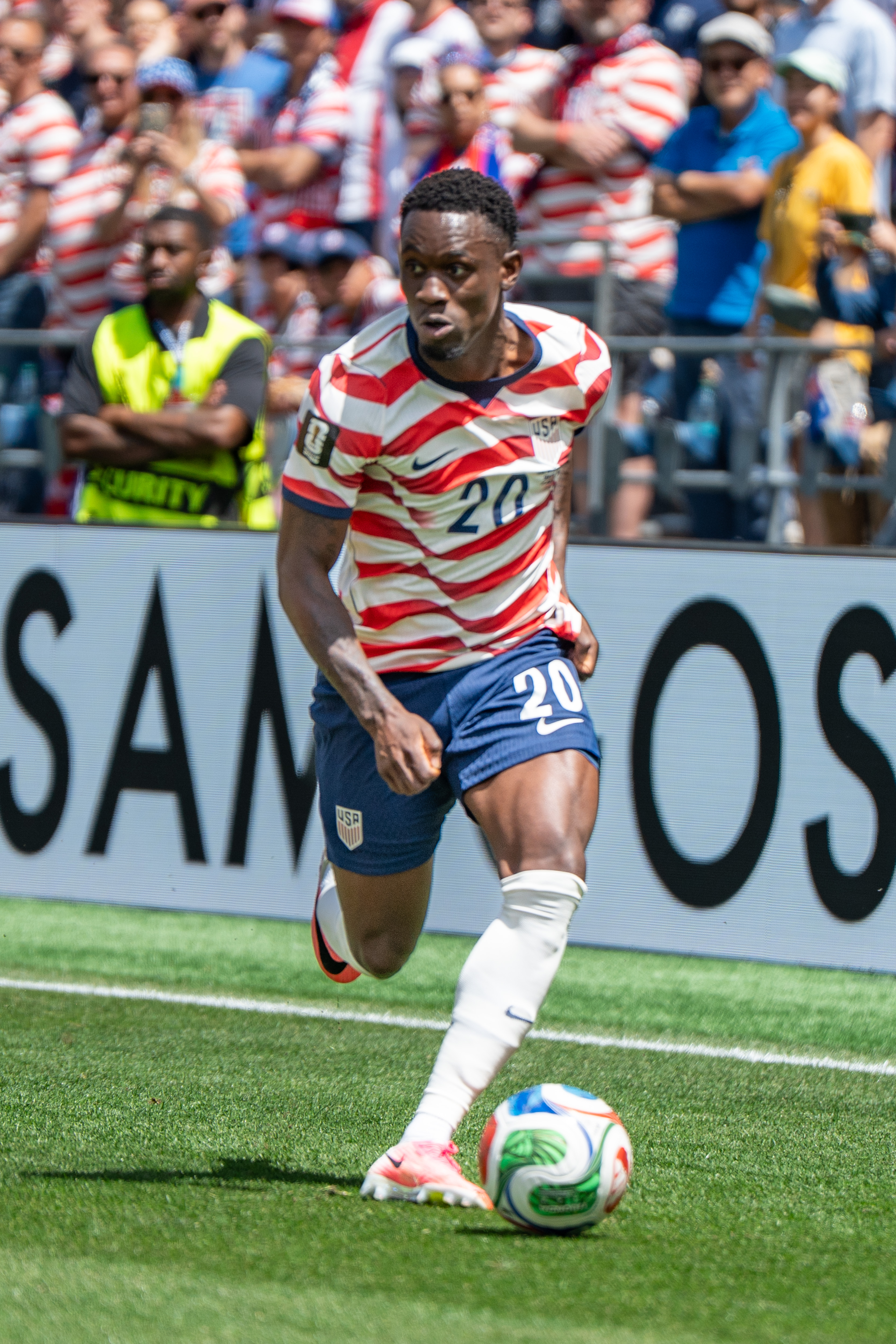
Balogun playing for the United States at the 2026 FIFA World Cup

On May 26, 2026, Balogun was selected in the 26-man squad for the 2026 FIFA World Cup. On June 12, in his World Cup debut and the team's opening group stage match against Paraguay, Balogun scored twice in the 4–1 opener, being named Player of the Match. The game marked the first time an American had a multi-goal World Cup match in 96 years, since the 1930 FIFA World Cup in Uruguay, when Bert Patenaude scored the first hat-trick in World Cup history, coincidentally also against Paraguay. The following game against Australia, he won a second back-to-back Player of the Match award as the United States secured top spot in Group D.

===== Red card controversy =====
Balogun scored the opening goal in the 2–0 win against Bosnia and Herzegovina in the round of 32, matching Landon Donovan for the second-most goals scored by an American in a single FIFA World Cup, with three, trailing only Patenaude's four goals in 1930. However, later in the game he received a red card from referee Raphael Claus for a contact foul on the ankle of Tarik Muharemović in the 64th minute when the two players were challenging for the ball. This made Balogun only the fourth World Cup player to score a goal and receive a red card in the same match, most recently by Zinedine Zidane in 2006. This initially forced him out of the United States' round of 16 match against Belgium, which led to outrage by American fans and caused a media campaign of "Free Flo".

The ban was later suspended by FIFA after a review, allowing him to play against Belgium, a decision that sparked controversy over the application of disciplinary rules and claims of political interference involving the Trump administration. The United States went on to lose 4–1 to Belgium, with Balogun featuring in the match. Balogun later said he expected the decision to "cause a lot of controversy", but was grateful to return to the team.

== Style of play ==
Balogun is known for his pace, technique, and two-footedness. Labelled a pure "number nine" or center forward, Balogun has also played as a trequartista in youth soccer, and was deployed by Chris Wilder in a second-striker role at Middlesbrough. Martin Keown compared Balogun to Arsenal's second highest ever goalscorer Ian Wright, due to his pace and intelligent movement.

== Career statistics ==
=== Club ===
As of match played October 25, 2026

Appearances and goals by club, season and competition
| Club | Season | League | | | National cup (Note: Includes FA Cup, Coupe de France) | | League cup (Note: Includes EFL Cup) | | Continental | | Other | | Total | |
| Club | Season | Division | Apps | Goals | Apps | Goals | Apps | Goals | Apps | Goals | Apps | Goals | Apps | Goals |
|---|---|---|---|---|---|---|---|---|---|---|---|---|---|---|
| Arsenal U21 | 2018–19 | — | | | — | | — | | — | | 1 (Note: Appearance(s) in EFL Trophy) | 0 | 1 | 0 |
| Arsenal U21 | 2019–20 | — | | | — | | — | | — | | 1 | 0 | 1 | 0 |
| Arsenal U21 | 2020–21 | — | | | — | | — | | — | | 2 | 1 | 2 | 1 |
| Arsenal U21 | 2021–22 | — | | | — | | — | | — | | 2 | 2 | 2 | 2 |
| Arsenal U21 | Total | | — | | — | | — | | — | | 6 | 3 | 6 | 3 |
| Arsenal | 2020–21 | Premier League | 0 | 0 | 0 | 0 | 1 | 0 | 5 (Note: Appearances in UEFA Europa League) | 2 | — | | 6 | 2 |
| Arsenal | 2021–22 | Premier League | 2 | 0 | 0 | 0 | 2 | 0 | — | | — | | 4 | 0 |
| Arsenal | Total | | 2 | 0 | 0 | 0 | 3 | 0 | 5 | 2 | — | | 10 | 2 |
| Middlesbrough (loan) | 2021–22 | Championship | 18 | 3 | 2 | 0 | — | | — | | — | | 20 | 3 |
| Reims (loan) | 2022–23 | Ligue 1 | 37 | 21 | 2 | 1 | — | | — | | — | | 39 | 22 |
| Monaco | 2023–24 | Ligue 1 | 29 | 7 | 3 | 1 | — | | — | | — | | 32 | 8 |
| Monaco | 2024–25 | Ligue 1 | 13 | 4 | 0 | 0 | — | | 3 (Note: Appearances in UEFA Champions League) | 0 | 0 | 0 | 16 | 4 |
| Monaco | 2025–26 | Ligue 1 | 30 | 13 | 3 | 1 | — | | 10 | 5 | — | | 43 | 19 |
| Monaco | 2026–27 | Ligue 1 | 4 | 0 | 0 | 0 | — | | 0 | 0 | — | | 4 | 0 |
| Monaco | Total | | 76 | 24 | 6 | 2 | — | | 13 | 5 | 0 | 0 | 95 | 31 |
| Career total | | | 133 | 48 | 10 | 3 | 3 | 0 | 18 | 7 | 6 | 3 | 170 | 61 |

=== International ===
As of match played November 17, 2026

Appearances and goals by national team and year
| National team | Year | Apps | Goals |
|---|---|---|---|
| United States | 2023 | 8 | 3 |
| United States | 2024 | 9 | 2 |
| United States | 2025 | 6 | 3 |
| United States | 2026 | 10 | 5 |
| Total | | 33 | 13 |

Scores and results list the United States' goal tally first, score column indicates score after each Balogun goal.

List of international goals scored by Folarin Balogun
| No. | Date | Venue | Cap | Opponent | Score | Result | Competition |
|---|---|---|---|---|---|---|---|
| 1 | June 18, 2023 | Allegiant Stadium, Paradise, United States | 2 | Canada | 2–0 | 2–0 | 2023 CONCACAF Nations League final |
| 2 | September 12, 2023 | Allianz Field, Saint Paul, United States | 4 | Oman | 1–0 | 4–0 | Friendly |
| 3 | October 17, 2023 | Geodis Park, Nashville, United States | 6 | Ghana | 3–0 | 4–0 | Friendly |
| 4 | June 23, 2024 | AT&T Stadium, Arlington, United States | 13 | Bolivia | 2–0 | 2–0 | 2024 Copa América |
| 5 | June 27, 2024 | Mercedes-Benz Stadium, Atlanta, United States | 14 | Panama | 1–0 | 1–2 | 2024 Copa América |
| 6 | September 9, 2025 | Lower.com Field, Columbus, United States | 19 | Japan | 2–0 | 2–0 | Friendly |
| 7 | October 10, 2025 | Q2 Stadium, Austin, United States | 20 | Ecuador | 1–1 | 1–1 | Friendly |
| 8 | November 15, 2025 | Subaru Park, Chester, United States | 22 | Paraguay | 2–1 | 2–1 | Friendly |
| 9 | May 31, 2026 | Bank of America Stadium, Charlotte, United States | 26 | Senegal | 3–2 | 3–2 | Friendly |
| 10 | June 12, 2026 | SoFi Stadium, Inglewood, United States | 28 | Paraguay | 2–0 | 4–1 | 2026 FIFA World Cup |
| 11 | June 12, 2026 | SoFi Stadium, Inglewood, United States | 28 | Paraguay | 3–0 | 4–1 | 2026 FIFA World Cup |
| 12 | July 1, 2026 | Levi's Stadium, Santa Clara, United States | 30 | Bosnia and Herzegovina | 1–0 | 2–0 | 2026 FIFA World Cup |
| 13 | November 14, 2026 | Nu Stadium, Miami, United States | 32 | Haiti | 6–0 | 6–0 | 2026–27 CONCACAF Nations League A |

== Honors ==
United States

- CONCACAF Nations League: 2022–23, 2023–24

Individual

- CONCACAF Nations League Finals Best XI: 2023
- Monaco Player of the Season: 2025–26
