= Dion Lopy =

Senegalese footballer (born 2002)

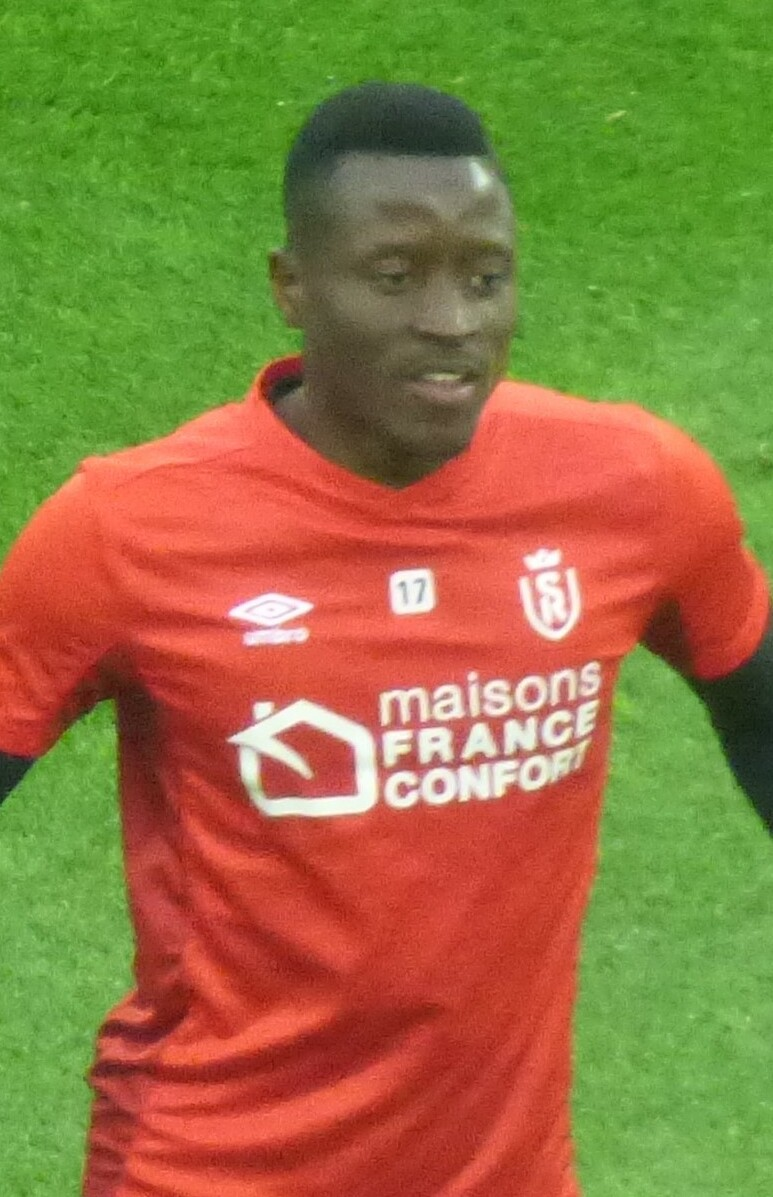
- Lopy in 2023

Personal information
- Full name: Dion Lopy
- Date of birth: 2 February 2002 (age 24)
- Place of birth: Dakar, Senegal
- Height: 1.84 m (6 ft 0 in)
- Position: Defensive midfielder

Team information
- Current team: Al-Ittihad
- Number: 30

Youth career
- –2020: Oslo Football Academy

Senior career*
Years	Team	Apps	(Gls)
2020–2022	Reims II	4	(0)
2021–2023	Reims	59	(0)
2023–2026	Almería	93	(4)
2026–	Al-Ittihad	8	(0)

International career^{‡}
2019	Senegal U17	4	(0)
2019	Senegal U20	9	(2)
2019–	Senegal	7	(0)
- * Club domestic league appearances and goals as of 23 October 2026 ‡ National team caps and goals as of 22:30, 16 November 2026 (UTC)

Dion Lopy (born 2 February 2002) is a Senegalese professional footballer who plays as a defensive midfielder for Saudi Pro League club Al-Ittihad and the Senegal national team.

== Club career ==
=== Reims ===
Lopy played youth football for the Oslo Football Academy in the 3rd tier of Senegalese football, before being signed for a compensatory fee by French club Stade de Reims in 2020 after Lopy represented Senegal at the 2019 FIFA U-20 World Cup.

Lopy played briefly for Reims' second team in the Championnat National 2, before making his Ligue 1 debut in a 2–2 draw with Stade Rennais on 4 April 2021. In the 2022–23 season, he became a first-team regular at Reims, benefitting from manager Will Still's preference for a younger age profile to his squad.

=== Almería ===
On 5 August 2023, Lopy was announced at La Liga side Almería on a six-year contract.

=== Al-Ittihad ===
On 5 August 2026, Al-Ittihad announced the signing of Lopy on a three-year deal, for a rumoured fee of € 19 million.

== International career ==
Lopy played for Senegal throughout the youth levels, representing them at the 2019 FIFA U-20 World Cup and the 2019 U-20 Africa Cup of Nations where they were runners-up.

Lopy made his debut for the senior Senegal national team on 3 August 2019, in a 3–0 victory over Liberia. He had to wait until 28 March 2023 for his second first team appearance, a 1–0 away victory over Mozambique.

== Career statistics ==
=== Club ===
As of match played 12 April 2026

Appearances and goals by club, season and competition
Club	Season	League			National cup (Note: Includes Coupe de France, Copa del Rey)		Other		Total	
Club	Season	Division	Apps	Goals	Apps	Goals	Apps	Goals	Apps	Goals
Reims II	2020–21	Championnat National 2	2	0	–		–		2	0
Reims II	2021–22	Championnat National 2	2	0	–		–		2	0
Reims II	Total		4	0	–		–		4	0
Reims	2020–21	Ligue 1	4	0	0	0	–		4	0
Reims	2021–22	Ligue 1	26	0	1	0	–		27	0
Reims	2022–23	Ligue 1	29	0	2	0	–		31	0
Reims	Total		59	0	3	0	–		62	0
Almería	2023–24	La Liga	30	0	2	0	–		32	0
Almería	2024–25	Segunda División	36	1	3	0	2 (Note: Appearances in La Liga play-offs)	0	41	1
Almería	2025–26	Segunda División	22	3	1	0	–		23	3
Almería	Total		88	4	6	0	2	0	95	4
Career total			151	4	9	0	2	0	161	4

=== International ===
As of matches played 16 November 2026

Appearances and goals by national team and year
National team	Year	Apps	Goals
Senegal	2019	1	0
Senegal	2020	0	0
Senegal	2021	0	0
Senegal	2022	0	0
Senegal	2023	2	0
Senegal	2024	2	0
Senegal	2025	0	0
Senegal	2026	2	0
Total		7	0
