= Wout Faes =

Belgian footballer (born 1998)

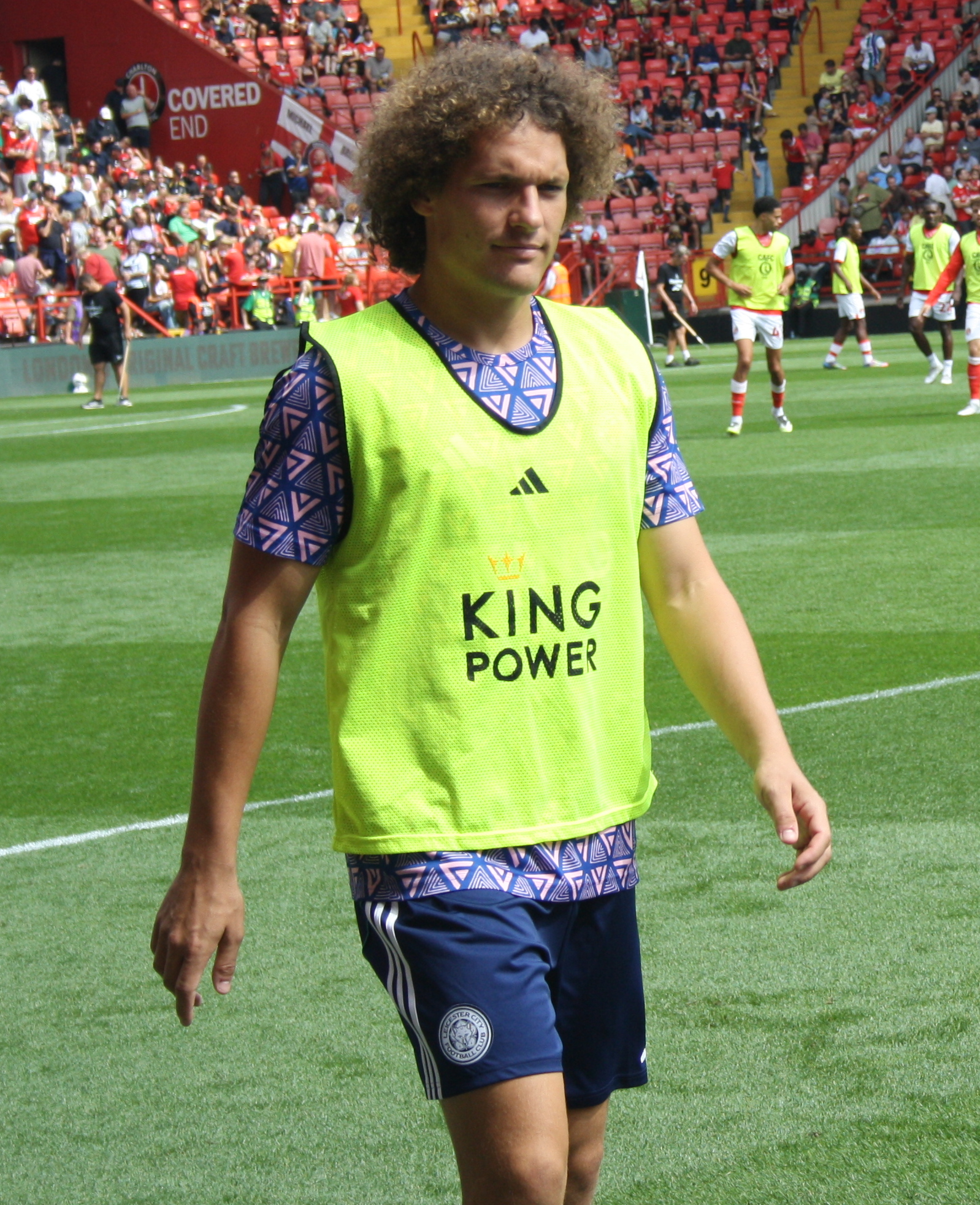
- Faes with Leicester City in 2025

Personal information
- Full name: Wout Felix Lina Faes
- Date of birth: 3 April 1998 (age 28)
- Place of birth: Mol, Belgium
- Height: 1.87 m (6 ft 2 in)
- Position: Centre-back

Team information
- Current team: Shabab Al Ahli

Youth career
- 2003–2006: Rauw Sport Mol
- 2006–2012: Lierse
- 2012–2016: Anderlecht

Senior career*
Years	Team	Apps	(Gls)
2016–2018	Anderlecht	0	(0)
2017	→ Heerenveen (loan)	7	(0)
2017–2018	→ Excelsior (loan)	19	(0)
2018–2020	Oostende	57	(1)
2020–2022	Reims	73	(5)
2020	→ Oostende (loan)	6	(0)
2022–2026	Leicester City	124	(5)
2026	→ Monaco (loan)	14	(0)
2026—	Shabab Al Ahli	7	(0)

International career^{‡}
2013	Belgium U15	5	(1)
2013–2015	Belgium U17	27	(0)
2016–2017	Belgium U19	9	(1)
2017–2020	Belgium U21	21	(0)
2022–	Belgium	28	(0)
- * Club domestic league appearances and goals as of 12:33, 28 September 2026 (UTC) ‡ National team caps and goals as of 12:24, 28 September 2026 (UTC)

Wout Felix Lina Faes (born 3 April 1998) is a Belgian professional footballer who plays as centre-back for UAE Pro League side Shabab Al Ahli and the Belgium national team.

A promising talent from the Anderlecht academy, Faes was sent on loan with Heerenveen and Excelsior in the Eredivisie, but never experienced his breakthrough with Anderlecht. As a result, he moved to Oostende, where he was able to grow into a solid starter. In January 2020, Faes was signed by Ligue 1 club Reims and was sent back on loan to Oostende for the rest of the season. He subsequently joined Leicester City in 2022.

Faes represented Belgium in youth levels, where he gained attention as the captain of Belgian national youth teams. He made his senior debut for Belgium in 2022 and was part of their squads for the 2022 FIFA World Cup and UEFA Euro 2024.

== Club career ==
=== Anderlecht ===
==== Early years ====
Faes moved to the Anderlecht youth academy from Lierse in 2012. He could then count on interest from Premier League club Chelsea and Manchester United, but he still signed his first professional contract with Anderlecht. From the 2015–16 season, Faes began practising regularly with the club's first team. A month after he took bronze with Belgium U17 at the 2015 FIFA U-17 World Cup, he extended his contract with Anderlecht. Faes reached the semi-finals of the UEFA Youth League with the club in both the 2014–15 season and the 2015–16 season, with him captaining the team in the latter campaign.

==== Loans ====
Anderlecht sent Faes on loan to Dutch Eredivisie club Heerenveen for the second half of the 2016–17 season. Anderlecht did not include an option to buy. Faes made his debut in the Eredivisie on 1 April 2017. He came on as a substitute against Heracles Almelo in the 35th minute for Reza Ghoochannejhad. The defender then received a place in the starting line-up in all remaining games of the regular season. His last match for Heerenveen was the first leg of the semi-final of the play-offs for European football against Utrecht. Heerenveen ultimately lost twice to Utrecht, which meant that the club missed out on UEFA Europa League participation that season.

On his return to Anderlecht, Faes was immediately demoted to the C-team by the new head coach René Weiler. On 12 July 2017, it was announced that Excelsior had signed Faes on a one-season loan deal. Shortly after his arrival, Faes was joined by a fellow countryman in Jinty Caenepeel. The first three matchdays, Faes was in the starting line-up of head coach Mitchell van der Gaag, who emphasised defensive football, but afterwards he received less playing time due to the renewal of Jordy de Wijs's loan deal. Despite the fact that De Wijs formed a very strong central defensive duo with Jurgen Mattheij that season, Faes made nineteen league appearances in the Eredivisie that season.

=== Oostende ===
In the summer of 2018, Faes decided to permanently leave Anderlecht as he signed a three-year contract with first-tier club Oostende, where he was reunited with Gert Verheyen, his former coach from the national youth teams. It was also Verheyen who had insisted on the club signing Faes. In Ostend, Faes grew into a regular in the centre of the defence. In his first season, he missed only five league games, three of which were due to suspension and two due to a minor foot injury. He also reached the semi-finals of the Belgian Cup with the club, in which the club was only knocked out after a penalty-shootout against Gent.

Faes was also an important force at Oostende in the 2019–20 season, who, however, experienced a rough season. During the first half of the season, Faes' name regularly emerged in media as a potential sale object. Faes, who played a good first half of the season and regularly wore the captain's armband, was eventually sold on 31 January 2020 to the French Ligue 1 club Reims. Reims let Faes finish the season at Oostende on loan, who at that time were still involved in a relegation battle. The club was ultimately able regain themselves in the top-tier Belgian First Division A, although the club had not yet been mathematically saved when the competition was stopped due to the COVID-19 pandemic.

=== Reims ===
After officially joining Reims from the start of the 2020–21 season, Faes made his Ligue 1 debut on 23 August 2020 in a 2–2 away draw against Monaco, in which he played the full match. On 1 November, he scored his first goal for the club in a 2–1 home win over Strasbourg; a powerful header from a corner-kick taken by Valon Berisha. He finished his first season with Reims with 35 appearances in which he scored two goals, as the club finished 14th in the league. Faes also featured in the Europa League qualifiers with Reims, who were eventually knocked out by Fehérvár in the third round.

=== Leicester City ===
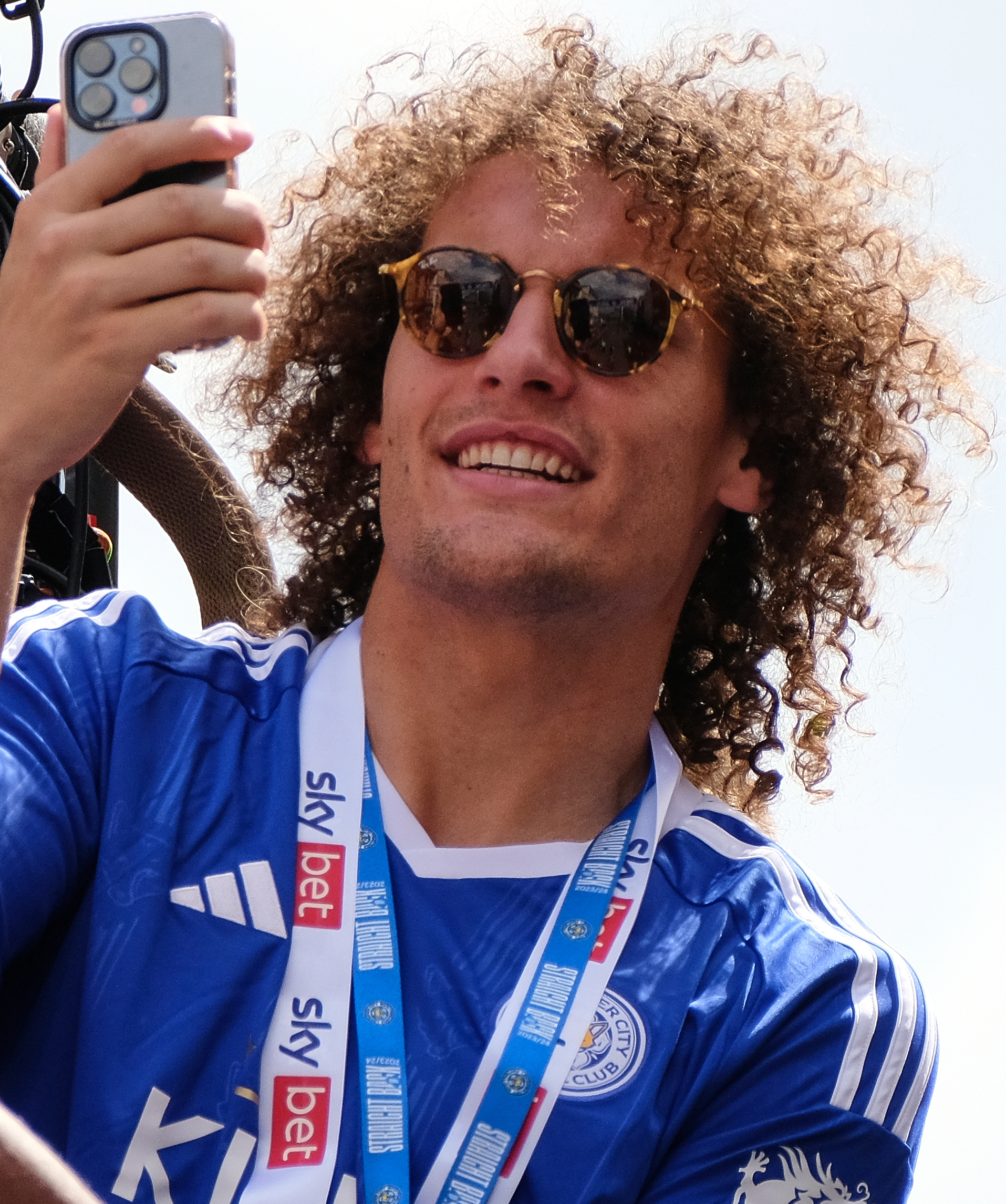
Faes celebrating promotion with Leicester City in 2024 calendar

On 1 September 2022, Faes joined Premier League club Leicester City on a five-year deal for a reported fee of £15 million. He made his debut for the club in a 6–2 defeat against Tottenham Hotspur on 17 September. Faes was praised for his impact on the club's defence since his debut, and in the seven Premier League games since the match against Tottenham, Leicester recorded five clean sheets. On 30 December 2022, he scored two own goals in a 2–1 loss to Liverpool, becoming the fourth player in Premier League history to score two own goals in the same match.

Faes scored his first goal for Leicester on 28 May 2023 in a 2–1 victory against West Ham United on the final match day of the season. Despite the win, Leicester were relegated to the Championship due to Everton's 1–0 win over Bournemouth.

==== Loan to Monaco ====
On 13 January 2026, Faes joined Ligue 1 side Monaco on loan until the end of the 2025–26 season, with the option to make the deal permanent for between €5 million and €10 million.

=== Shabab Al Ahli ===
On 28 September 2026, Faes signed for UAE Pro League side Shabab Al Ahli.

== International career ==
Faes represented the Belgium under-17s at the 2015 U-17 World Cup in Chile.

In November 2021, he received his first call-up to the senior Belgium national team for 2022 FIFA World Cup qualification matches against Estonia and Wales, and was an unused substitute in the latter match. Faes made his debut for Belgium on 8 June 2022 in a 6–1 win over Poland in the UEFA Nations League. Together with Leicester City teammates Timothy Castagne and Youri Tielemans, he was subsequently called up to Belgium's squad for the World Cup in November 2022.

== Career statistics ==
=== Club ===
As of match played 19 September 2026

Appearances and goals by club, season and competition
Club	Season	League			National cup (Note: Includes KNVB Cup, Belgian Cup, Coupe de France, FA Cup, UAE President's Cup)		League cup (Note: Includes EFL Cup, UAE League Cup)		Continental		Other		Total	
Club	Season	Division	Apps	Goals	Apps	Goals	Apps	Goals	Apps	Goals	Apps	Goals	Apps	Goals
Heerenveen (loan)	2016–17	Eredivisie	7	0	0	0	—		—		1 (Note: Appearance in Eredivisie Europa League play-offs)	0	8	0
Excelsior (loan)	2017–18	Eredivisie	19	0	1	0	—		—		0	0	20	0
Oostende	2018–19	Belgian Pro League	26	1	5	1	—		—		9 (Note: Appearances in Belgian Pro League Europa League play-offs)	0	40	2
Oostende	2019–20	Belgian Pro League	22	0	2	0	—		—		0	0	24	0
Oostende	Total		48	1	7	1	0	0	0	0	9	0	64	2
Oostende (loan)	2019–20	Belgian Pro League	6	0	0	0	—		—		0	0	6	0
Reims	2020–21	Ligue 1	33	1	0	0	—		2 (Note: Appearances in UEFA Europa League)	0	—		35	1
Reims	2021–22	Ligue 1	37	4	2	0	—		—		—		39	4
Reims	2022–23	Ligue 1	3	0	—		—		—		—		3	0
Reims	Total		73	5	2	0	0	0	2	0	0	0	77	5
Leicester City	2022–23	Premier League	31	1	2	0	3	0	—		—		36	1
Leicester City	2023–24	Championship	43	2	1	0	2	0	—		—		46	2
Leicester City	2024–25	Premier League	34	1	2	1	1	0	—		—		37	2
Leicester City	2025–26	Championship	15	1	0	0	1	0	—		—		16	1
Leicester City	2026–27	League One	1	0	—		0	0	—		0	0	1	0
Leicester City	Total		124	5	5	1	7	0	0	0	0	0	136	6
Monaco (loan)	2025–26	Ligue 1	14	0	0	0	—		2 (Note: Appearances in UEFA Champions League)	0	—		16	0
Shabab Al Ahli	2026–27	UAE Pro League	0	0	0	0	0	0	0	0	—		0	0
Career total			291	11	15	2	7	0	4	0	11	0	328	13

=== International ===
As of match played 9 June 2025

Appearances and goals by national team and year
National team	Year	Apps	Goals
Belgium	2022	1	0
Belgium	2023	10	0
Belgium	2024	14	0
Belgium	2025	3	0
Total		28	0

== Honours ==
Leicester City

- EFL Championship: 2023–24

Belgium U17

- FIFA U-17 World Cup third place: 2015

Individual

- Stade de Reims Player of the Season: 2021–22
- UEFA European Under-17 Championship Team of the Tournament: 2015
