= Jens Cajuste =

Swedish footballer (born 1999)

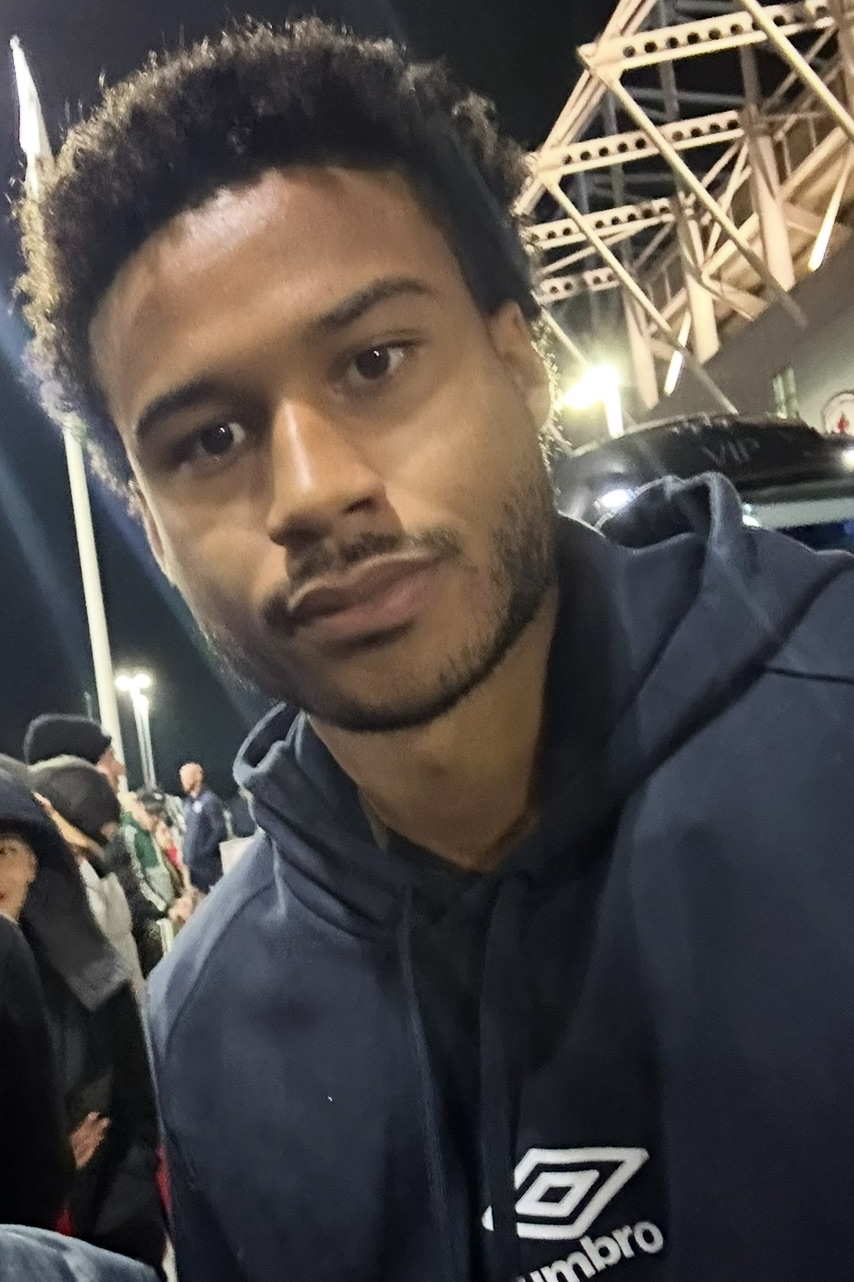
- Cajuste with Ipswich Town in 2025

Personal information
- Full name: Jens-Lys Michel Cajuste
- Date of birth: 10 August 1999 (age 27)
- Place of birth: Gothenburg, Sweden
- Height: 1.88 m (6 ft 2 in)
- Position: Central midfielder

Team information
- Current team: Málaga (on loan from Napoli)
- Number: 2

Youth career
- 2006–2008: Sports Beijing
- 2008–2009: Yu Ye Beijing
- 2009–2010: Guldhedens IK
- 2010–2016: Örgryte IS

Senior career*
Years	Team	Apps	(Gls)
2016–2018	Örgryte IS	14	(0)
2018–2022	Midtjylland	58	(2)
2022–2023	Reims	39	(5)
2023–	Napoli	26	(0)
2024–2026	→ Ipswich Town (loan)	60	(2)
2026–	→ Málaga (loan)	1	(0)

International career^{‡}
2019	Sweden U21	3	(0)
2020–2024	Sweden	25	(0)
- * Club domestic league appearances and goals as of 23:01, 6 September 2026 (UTC) ‡ National team caps and goals as of 21:20, 9 September 2024 (UTC)

Jens-Lys Michel Cajuste (Swedish pronunciation: [jɛns kaˈjɵst]; born 10 August 1999) is a Swedish professional footballer who plays as a central midfielder for La Liga club Málaga, on loan from Serie A club Napoli.

== Club career ==
=== Early career ===
Cajuste was born in Sweden to a Haitian-American father and a Swedish mother. He moved to China with his family at age five, living one year in Luoyang before moving to Beijing. There, he began his football career with Chinese Sports Beijing. A few years later, the family returned to Sweden. As a ten-year-old, Cajuste started playing for Örgryte IS. After impressing in the club's youth teams, he was rewarded with a senior contract in 2016. On 17 October 2016, Cajuste made his senior debut for Örgryte in the Superettan where they lost 4–1 to IK Sirius.

=== Midtjylland ===
In June 2018, Cajuste moved to Denmark's Midtjylland, where he signed a five-year contract. He made his debut for the club on 26 August 2018 in a match against Randers. His first goal also came against Randers, which also proved to be the winner, in a 2–1 league victory on 21 October 2019.

On 21 October 2020, he made his UEFA Champions League debut in a group stage home game against Atalanta, which Midtjylland lost 4–0.

=== Reims ===
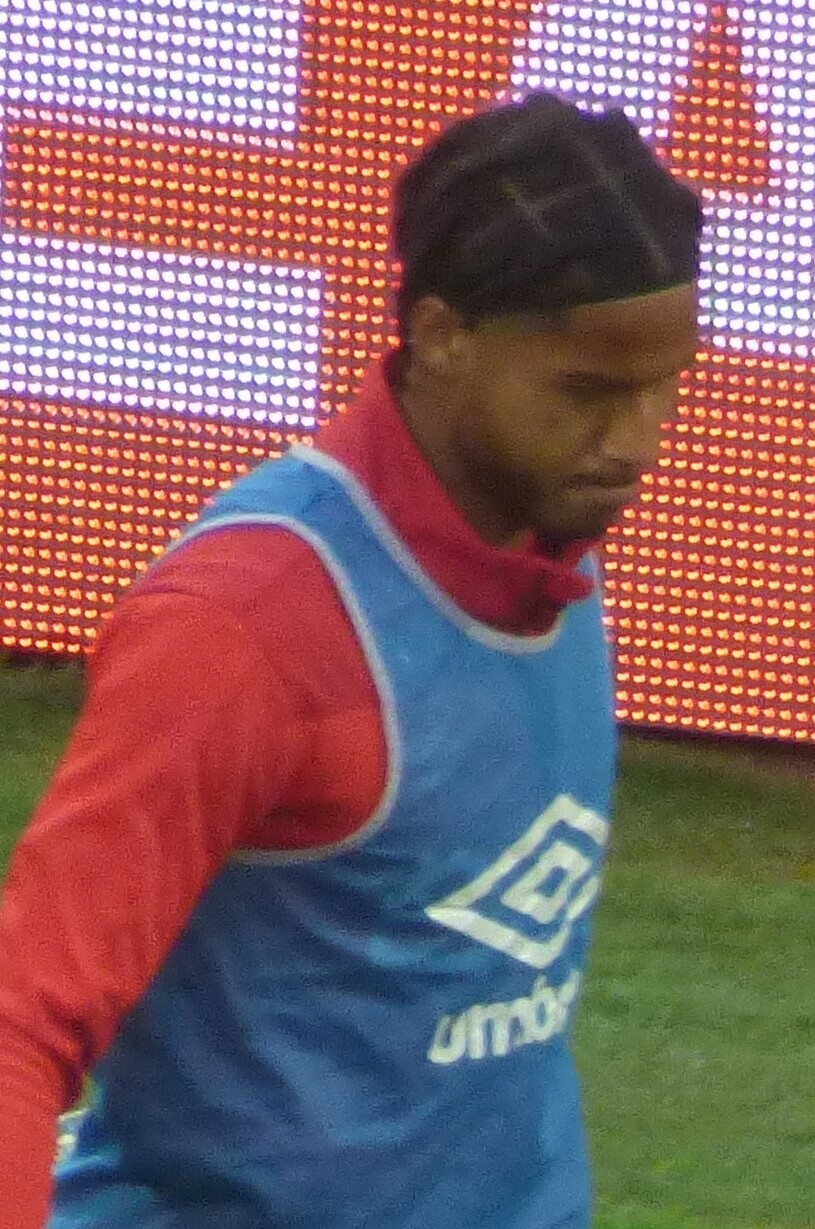
Cajuste warming up prior to the Reims' match against RC Lens on 12 May 2023.

On 10 January 2022, Cajuste signed for French club Reims in a transfer deal worth a reported €10 million. He became the club's record signing. A few days later, Reims director-general Mathieu Lacour disputed the reported fee, stating that the price was around half of what Midtjylland had announced.

Cajuste made his debut for Reims in a Ligue 1 match against Metz on 16 January 2022, starting in central midfield before being substituted off for Alexis Flips at half-time, as Reims lost 1–0.

=== Napoli ===
On 10 August 2023, Cajuste joined Serie A club Napoli, by signing a five-year contract for a reported fee of €12 million.

==== Loans to Ipswich Town ====
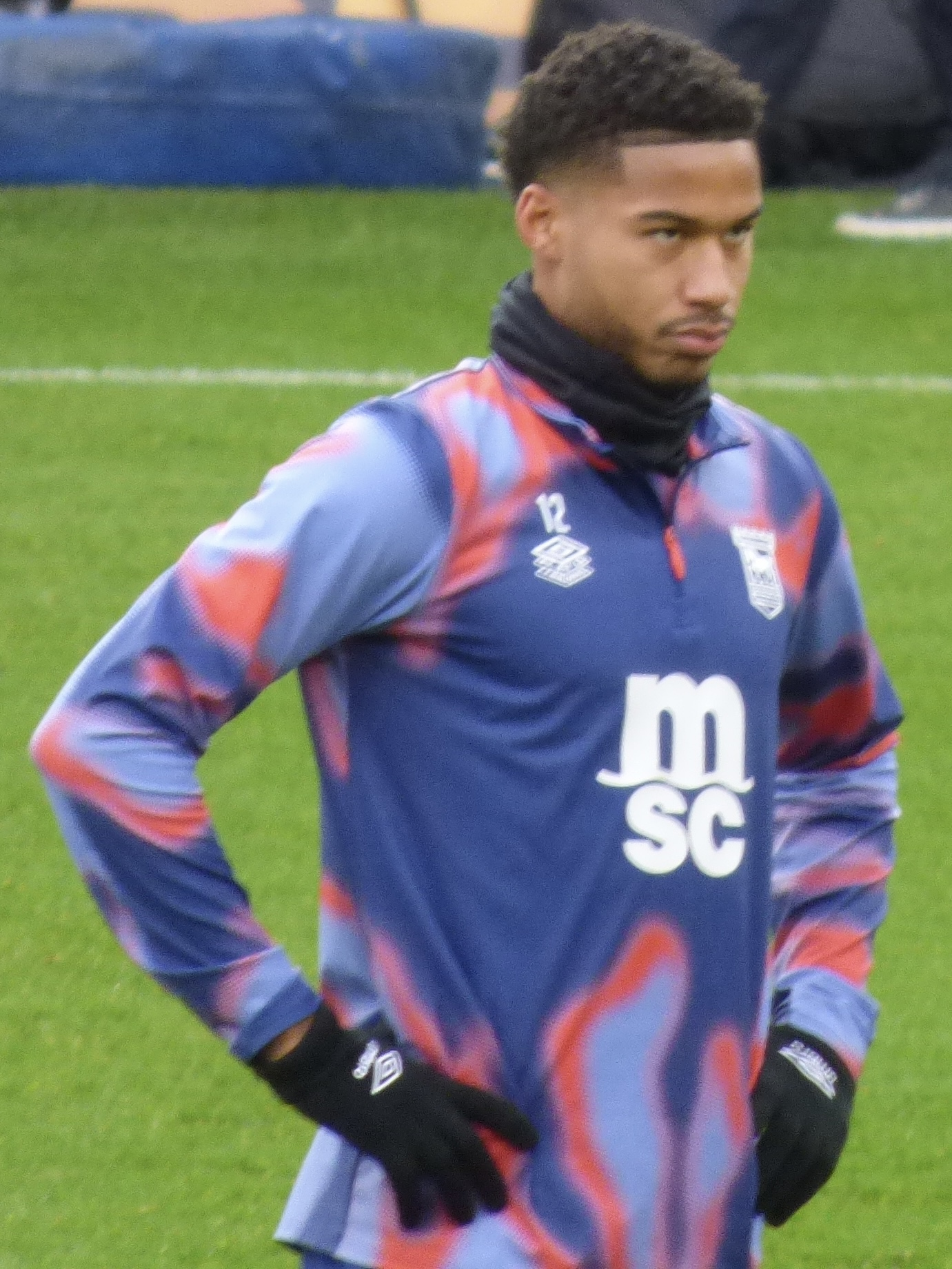
Cajuste with Ipswich Town in 2024.

On 19 August 2024, Cajuste joined newly promoted Premier League club Ipswich Town on loan for the 2024–25 season. He won the Premier League Goal of the Month for his goal against Nottingham Forest in March.

On 7 August 2025, Cajuste returned to Ipswich Town on loan for the 2025–26 season. It was reported that the loan has a buy clause if Ipswich Town gets promoted for £7.5m.

==== Loan to Málaga ====
On 1 September 2026, Cajuste joined La Liga side Málaga on a one-year loan deal.

== International career ==
On 4 November 2020, Cajuste was called up to the Sweden national team for their friendly game against Denmark and UEFA Nations League games against Croatia and France. He made his international debut in a 2–0 loss against Denmark on 12 November 2020.

Cajuste was called up for a major tournament for the first time when he was included in Sweden's 26-man squad for UEFA Euro 2020.

== Career statistics ==
=== Club ===
As of match played 6 September 2026

Appearances and goals by club, season and competition
Club	Season	League			National cup (Note: Includes Svenska Cupen, Danish Cup, Coupe de France, Coppa Italia, FA Cup, Copa del Rey)		League cup (Note: Includes EFL Cup)		Europe		Other		Total	
Club	Season	Division	Apps	Goals	Apps	Goals	Apps	Goals	Apps	Goals	Apps	Goals	Apps	Goals
Örgryte IS	2016	Superettan	3	0	—		—		—		—		3	0
Örgryte IS	2017	Superettan	3	0	2	0	—		—		2 (Note: Appearances in Superettan relegation play-offs)	0	7	0
Örgryte IS	2018	Superettan	8	0	—		—		—		—		8	0
Örgryte IS	Total		14	0	2	0	—		—		2	0	18	0
Midtjylland	2018–19	Danish Superliga	2	0	1	0	—		0	0	—		3	0
Midtjylland	2019–20	Danish Superliga	24	1	1	0	—		2 (Note: Appearances in UEFA Europa League)	0	—		27	1
Midtjylland	2020–21	Danish Superliga	27	1	4	0	—		8 (Note: Appearances in UEFA Champions League)	0	—		39	1
Midtjylland	2021–22	Danish Superliga	5	0	1	0	—		4	0	—		10	0
Midtjylland	Total		58	2	7	0	—		14	0	0	0	79	2
Reims	2021–22	Ligue 1	8	2	1	0	—		—		—		9	2
Reims	2022–23	Ligue 1	31	3	2	1	—		—		—		33	4
Reims	Total		39	5	3	1	—		—		—		42	6
Napoli	2023–24	Serie A	26	0	1	0	—		6	0	2 (Note: Appearances in Supercoppa Italiana)	0	35	0
Ipswich Town (loan)	2024–25	Premier League	30	1	2	0	1	0	—		—		33	1
Ipswich Town (loan)	2025–26	Championship	30	1	1	0	0	0	—		—		31	1
Ipswich Town (loan)	Total		60	2	3	0	1	0	—		—		64	2
Málaga (loan)	2026–27	La Liga	1	0	0	0	—		—		—		1	0
Career total			198	9	16	1	1	0	20	0	4	0	239	10

=== International ===
As of match played 8 September 2024

Appearances and goals by national team and year
National team	Year	Apps	Goals
Sweden	2020	2	0
Sweden	2021	7	0
Sweden	2022	5	0
Sweden	2023	6	0
Sweden	2024	5	0
Total		25	0

== Honours ==
Midtjylland

- Danish Superliga: 2019–20

Ipswich Town

- EFL Championship runner-up: 2025–26

Individual

- Premier League Goal of the Month: March 2025
- BBC Goal of the Month: March 2025
