= Kamory Doumbia =

Malian footballer (born 2003)

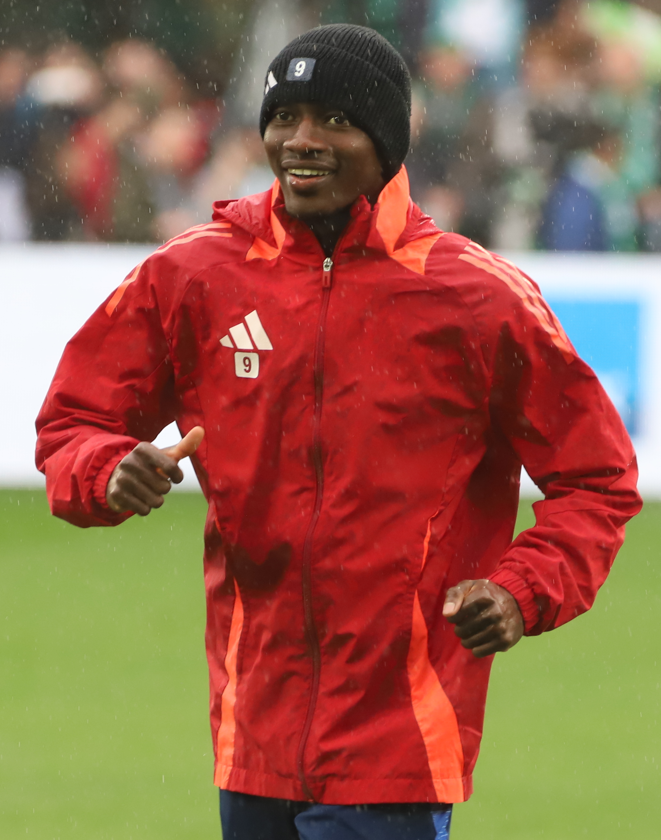
- Doumbia in 2025

Personal information
- Date of birth: 18 February 2003 (age 23)
- Place of birth: Bamako, Mali
- Height: 1.70 m (5 ft 7 in)
- Position: Attacking midfielder

Team information
- Current team: Brest
- Number: 23

Youth career
- Guidars

Senior career*
Years	Team	Apps	(Gls)
2021–2022	Reims II	14	(8)
2022–2024	Reims	34	(4)
2023–2024	→ Brest (loan)	25	(6)
2024–	Brest	59	(11)

International career^{‡}
2022–	Mali	36	(16)
- * Club domestic league appearances and goals as of 20 September 2026 ‡ National team caps and goals as of 13 November 2026

Kamory Doumbia (born 18 February 2003) is a Malian professional footballer who plays as an attacking midfielder for Ligue 1 club Brest and the Mali national team.

== Club career ==
Doumbia is a product of the academy of the Malian club Guidars. On 9 July 2021, he signed with the reserves of Reims. He made his professional debut with the senior Reims team in a 0–0 Ligue 1 tie with Clermont Foot on 9 January 2022. On 14 May, he scored his first goal for Reims in a 2–1 away win over Saint-Étienne.

On 1 September 2023, Doumbia joined Brest on loan for the 2023–24 season. Later that year, on 20 December, he scored four goals against Lorient within 26 minutes during the first half, equaling Edinson Cavani's record in 2016.

On 30 August 2024, Doumbia signed for Brest on a permanent deal for €4 million. On 19 September of the same year, Doumbia made his UEFA Champions League debut, coming on as a substitute in a match against Sturm Graz. Brest won the match 2–1 and, in their first-ever Champions League campaign, advanced to the knockout phase play-offs after progressing through the league phase.

Doumbia continued to impress in Ligue 1 during the same season. On 30 March 2025, he scored in the 62nd minute of a match against Toulouse, helping his team secure a 4–2 victory.

On 5 September 2026, Doumbia scored twice in an away match against Le Havre, converting a penalty in the 12th minute before scoring again in the 51st minute. His performance helped Brest secure a 2–1 victory. On 8 November of the same year, Doumbia provided an assist for Noah Edjouma's opening goal in a match against Lyon. Brest won the match 2–0.

== International career ==
Doumbia was called up to the Mali national team for matches in June 2022. He debuted with Mali in a 1–0 friendly win over Zambia on 23 September 2022.

He distinguished himself that day by providing the assist for El Bilal Touré’s winning goal in a 1–0 victory.

On 2 January 2024, he was named in the list of twenty-seven Malian players selected by Éric Chelle to compete in the 2023 Africa Cup of Nations.

On 11 December 2025, Doumbia was called up to the Mali squad for the 2025 Africa Cup of Nations.

== Career statistics ==
=== Club ===
As of 20 September 2026

Appearances and goals by club, season and competition
Club	Season	League			Coupe de France		Europe		Total	
Club	Season	Division	Apps	Goals	Apps	Goals	Apps	Goals	Apps	Goals
Reims II	2021–22	CFA	14	8	—		—		14	8
Reims	2021–22	Ligue 1	8	2	2	0	—		10	2
Reims	2022–23	Ligue 1	26	2	3	0	—		29	2
Reims	Total		34	4	5	0	—		39	4
Brest (loan)	2023–24	Ligue 1	25	6	1	0	—		26	6
Brest	2024–25	Ligue 1	30	3	4	0	10 (Note: Appearances in UEFA Champions League)	0	44	3
Brest	2025–26	Ligue 1	24	4	0	0	—		24	4
Brest	2026–27	Ligue 1	5	4	0	0	—		5	4
Brest	Total		59	11	4	0	10	0	73	11
Career total			132	25	10	0	10	0	152	27

=== International ===
As of match played 13 November 2026

Appearances and goals by national team and year
National team	Year	Apps	Goals
Mali	2022	1	0
Mali	2023	8	5
Mali	2024	12	5
Mali	2025	10	5
Mali	2026	5	1
Total		36	16

As of match played 13 November 2026
Scores and results list Mali's goal tally first, score column indicates score after each Doumbia goal.

List of international goals scored by Kamory Doumbia
No.	Date	Venue	Opponent	Score	Result	Competition
1	24 March 2023	26 March Stadium, Bamako, Mali	Gambia	1–0	2–0	2023 Africa Cup of Nations qualification
2	8 September 2023	26 March Stadium, Bamako, Mali	South Sudan	2–0	4–0	2023 Africa Cup of Nations qualification
3	8 September 2023	26 March Stadium, Bamako, Mali	South Sudan	3–0	4–0	2023 Africa Cup of Nations qualification
4	17 November 2023	26 March Stadium, Bamako, Mali	Chad	1–0	3–1	2026 FIFA World Cup qualification
5	20 November 2023	26 March Stadium, Bamako, Mali	Central African Republic	1–0	1–1	2026 FIFA World Cup qualification
6	6 January 2024	26 March Stadium, Bamako, Mali	Guinea-Bissau	3–1	6–2	Friendly
7	26 March 2024	Marrakesh Stadium, Marrakesh, Morocco	Nigeria	2–0	2–0	Friendly
8	6 June 2024	26 March Stadium, Bamako, Mali	Ghana	1–0	1–2	2026 FIFA World Cup qualification
9	15 November 2024	Zimpeto Stadium, Maputo, Mozambique	Mozambique	1–0	1–0	2025 Africa Cup of Nations qualification
10	19 November 2024	26 March Stadium, Bamako, Mali	Eswatini	4–0	6–0	2025 Africa Cup of Nations qualification
11	20 March 2025	Berkane Municipal Stadium, Berkane, Morocco	Comoros	2–0	3–0	2026 FIFA World Cup qualification
12	20 March 2025	Berkane Municipal Stadium, Berkane, Morocco	Comoros	3–0	3–0	2026 FIFA World Cup qualification
13	4 September 2025	Berkane Municipal Stadium, Berkane, Morocco	Comoros	2–0	3–0	2026 FIFA World Cup qualification
14	8 October 2025	Idriss Déby Itno Stadium, N'Djamena, Chad	Chad	1–0	2–0	2026 FIFA World Cup qualification
15	8 October 2025	Idriss Déby Itno Stadium, N'Djamena, Chad	Chad	2–0	2–0	2026 FIFA World Cup qualification
16	13 November 2026	26 March Stadium, Bamako, Mali	Rwanda	1–1	3–2	2027 Africa Cup of Nations qualification

== Honours ==
Individual

- Ligue 1 Goal of the Year: 2023–24
