= Maxime Busi =

Belgian footballer (born 1999)

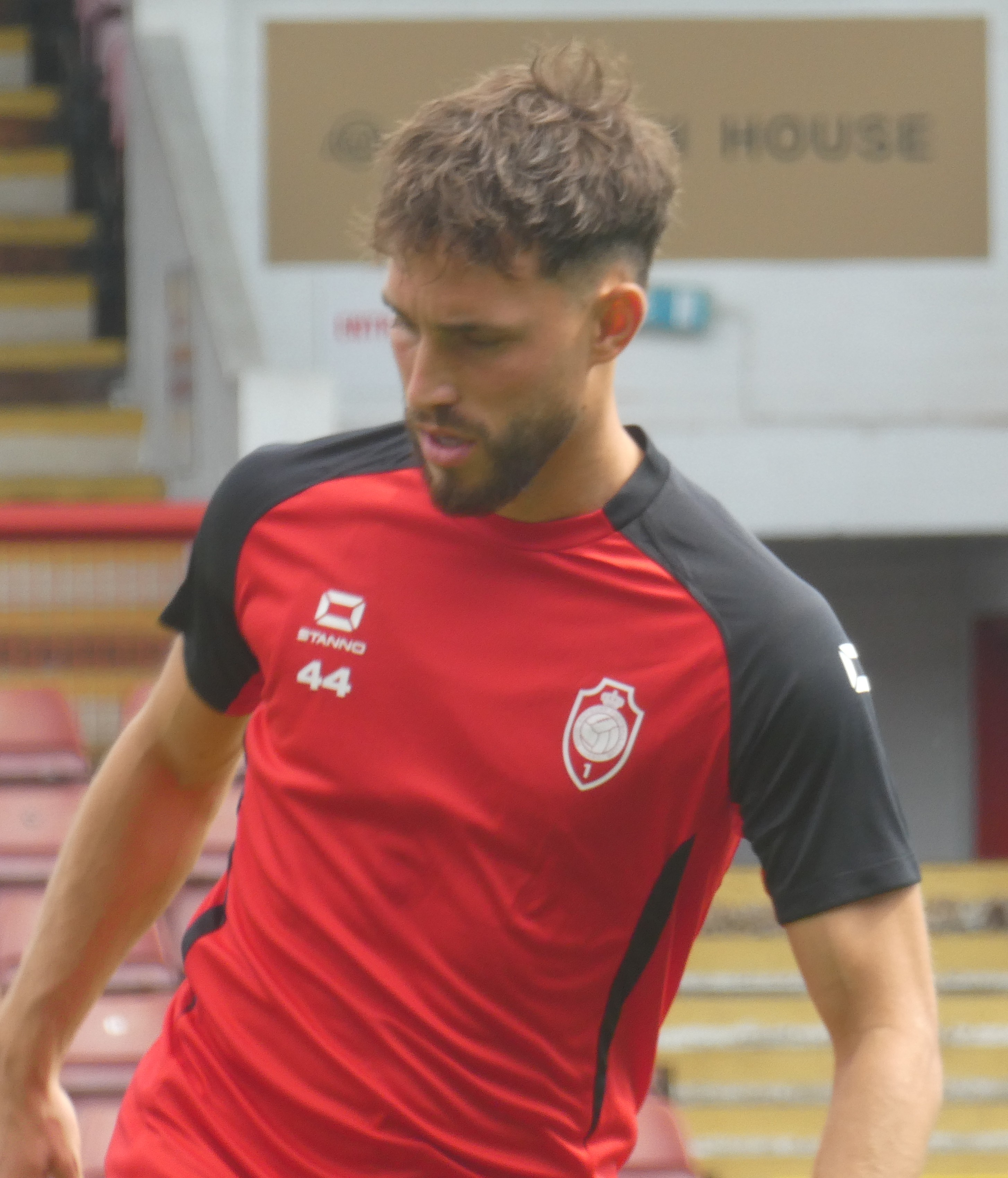

Personal information
- Date of birth: 14 October 1999 (age 27)
- Place of birth: Liège, Belgium
- Height: 1.82 m (6 ft 0 in)
- Position: Defender

Team information
- Current team: Antwerp

Senior career*
Years	Team	Apps	(Gls)
2019–2020	Charleroi	32	(0)
2020–2022	Parma	30	(0)
2022	→ Reims (loan)	18	(1)
2022–2026	Reims	49	(0)
2023	Reims B	1	(0)
2025	→ NAC Breda (loan)	13	(0)
2026–	Antwerp	0	(0)

International career
2019	Belgium U21	3	(0)
- * Club domestic league appearances and goals as of 11 May 2026

Maxime Busi (born 14 October 1999) is a Belgian professional footballer who plays as a defender for Belgian Pro League club Antwerp.

== Club career ==
On 5 October 2020, he signed a five-year contract with Italian club Parma. On 3 January 2022, he joined French side Reims on loan for the remainder of the 2021–22 season.

On 3 January 2025, Busi joined Eredivisie club NAC Breda on loan until the end of the season.

On 29 July 2026, Busi signed a three-year contract with Antwerp.

== Personal life ==
Born in Belgium, Busi is of Italian descent.
