= Alexis Flips =

French footballer (born 2000)

Personal information
- Full name: Alexis Laurent Patrice Roge Flips
- Date of birth: 18 January 2000 (age 26)
- Place of birth: Villeneuve-d'Ascq, France
- Height: 1.73 m (5 ft 8 in)
- Position: Winger

Team information
- Current team: RSCA Futures
- Number: 70

Youth career
- 2005–2008: Hellemmes
- 2008–2017: Lille

Senior career*
Years	Team	Apps	(Gls)
2017–2020	Lille II	51	(10)
2019–2020	→ Ajaccio II (loan)	4	(0)
2019–2020	→ Ajaccio (loan)	13	(0)
2020–2022	Reims II	4	(1)
2021–2023	Reims	60	(7)
2023–2026	Anderlecht	13	(0)
2024	→ Ankaragücü (loan)	10	(0)
2024–2025	→ Charleroi (loan)	13	(0)
2026–	RSCA Futures	5	(0)

International career
2015–2016	France U16	11	(0)
2016–2017	France U17	7	(1)
2017–2018	France U18	8	(4)
2018–2019	France U19	15	(3)
2019	France U20	2	(1)
- * Club domestic league appearances and goals as of 21 August 2026

Alexis Laurent Patrice Roge Flips (born 18 January 2000) is a French professional footballer who plays as a winger for Challenger Pro League side RSCA Futures.

== Club career ==
A youth product of Lille OSC, Flips was loaned to AC Ajaccio on 19 August 2019. He made his professional debut with Ajaccio in a 1–0 Ligue 2 win over Paris FC on 23 August 2019. On 5 October 2020, he transferred to Stade de Reims.

On 8 August 2023, Flips joined Anderlecht on a five-year deal.

On 6 February 2024, Flips was loaned to Ankaragücü in Turkey.

On 6 September 2024, Flips moved on loan to Charleroi, with an option to buy.

== International career ==
Flips is a youth international for France. He represented the France U17s at the 2017 FIFA U-17 World Cup.
