= 2023–24 Ligue 1 =

Ligue 1
- Season: 2023–24
- Dates: 11 August 2023 – 19 May 2024
- Champions: Paris Saint-Germain; 12th Ligue 1 title 12th French title
- Relegated: Metz; Lorient; Clermont
- Champions League: Paris Saint-Germain; Monaco; Brest; Lille
- Europa League: Nice; Lyon
- Conference League: Lens
- Matches: 306
- Goals: 826 (2.7 per match)
- Top goalscorer: Kylian Mbappé (27 goals)
- Biggest home win: Lorient 5–0 Clermont (19 May 2024)
- Biggest away win: Clermont 1–5 Marseille (2 March 2024); Montpellier 2–6 Paris Saint-Germain (17 March 2024)
- Highest scoring: Rennes 4–5 Brest (28 April 2024)
- Longest winning run: Paris Saint-Germain (8 matches)
- Longest unbeaten run: Paris Saint-Germain (26 matches)
- Longest winless run: Lorient; Lyon; Metz; Toulouse (10 matches)
- Longest losing run: Lorient; Metz (7 matches)
- Highest attendance: 66,046; Marseille 0–2 Paris Saint-Germain (31 March 2024)
- Lowest attendance: 0 Nantes 1–3 Lyon (7 April 2024)
- Attendance: 8,233,057 (26,905 per match)

The 2023–24 Ligue 1, also known as Ligue 1 Uber Eats for sponsorship reasons, was the 86th season of the Ligue 1, and the last for the Uber Eats sponsorship of the French premier football competition. The season began on 11 August 2023 and concluded on 19 May 2024. The relegation play-off was played on 30 May and 2 June 2024.

Paris Saint-Germain were the two-time defending champions, and mathematically secured a record-extending twelfth title with three matches to spare on 28 April 2024, following Monaco's 3–2 defeat against Lyon. It was also the club's tenth Ligue 1 title won in the last twelve seasons.

Ligue 1 reduced its number of teams from 20 to 18 starting with the 2023–24 season, resulting in a decrease in the number of matches per team from 38 to 34.

== Teams ==
A total of 18 teams participated in the 2023–24 edition of the Ligue 1. In June 2021, the LFP voted overwhelmingly at its general assembly to contract Ligue 1 back to 18 clubs for the 2023–24 season, by relegating four and promoting two from Ligue 2 after 2022–23.

=== Changes ===
Le Havre and Metz (who returned to the top flight after fourteen and one year's absence, respectively) were promoted after finishing first and second in the 2022–23 Ligue 2, respectively. They replaced Auxerre, Ajaccio (both relegated after one year in the top flight), Troyes and Angers (relegated after two and eight years in the top flight, respectively), who were relegated to 2023–24 Ligue 2.

As part of the UEFA Champions League revamped format, starting from this season, four clubs in Ligue 1 qualified, instead of the previous three. The top three teams qualified directly for the league phase, and the fourth team qualified for the third qualifying round.

▲ from 2022–23 Ligue 2	▼ to 2023–24 Ligue 2
Le Havre; Metz	Auxerre; Ajaccio; Troyes; Angers

=== Stadiums and locations ===
Location of teams in 2023–24 Ligue 1

Club	Location	Venue	Capacity	2022–23 season
Brest	Brest	Stade Francis-Le Blé	15,931	14th
Clermont	Clermont-Ferrand	Stade Gabriel Montpied	11,980	8th
Le Havre	Le Havre	Stade Océane	25,178	Ligue 2, 1st
Lens	Lens	Stade Bollaert-Delelis	37,705	2nd
Lille	Villeneuve-d'Ascq	Decathlon Arena Pierre Mauroy Stadium	50,186	5th
Lorient	Lorient	Stade du Moustoir	18,890	10th
Lyon	Lyon	Groupama Stadium	59,186	7th
Marseille	Marseille	Orange Vélodrome	67,394	3rd
Metz	Longeville-lès-Metz	Stade Saint-Symphorien	28,786	Ligue 2, 2nd
Monaco	Monaco	Stade Louis II	18,523	6th
Montpellier	Montpellier	Stade de la Mosson	32,900	12th
Nantes	Nantes	Stade de la Beaujoire	35,322	16th
Nice	Nice	Allianz Riviera	35,624	9th
Paris Saint-Germain	Paris	Parc des Princes	47,926	1st
Reims	Reims	Stade Auguste Delaune	21,684	11th
Rennes	Rennes	Roazhon Park	29,778	4th
Strasbourg	Strasbourg	Stade de la Meinau	29,230	15th
Toulouse	Toulouse	Stadium Municipal	33,150	13th

=== Personnel and kits ===
Team	Chairman	Manager	Captain	Kit manufacturer	Shirt sponsor (front)	Shirt sponsor (back)	Shirt sponsor (sleeve)	Shorts sponsor
Brest	(France) Denis Le Saint	(France) Éric Roy	(France) Brendan Chardonnet	Adidas	Quéguiner Matériaux (H)/Yaourt Malo (A & 3)/Le Petit Basque (A & 3), SILL (H)/Breizh Cola (A & 3), GUYOT Environnement, Oceania Hotels, Fée du Bonheur	Écomiam, J.Bervas Automobiles	Eaux de Zilia	E.Leclerc, SOFT-Société d'Organisation Financière et Technique
Clermont	(Switzerland) Ahmet Schaefer	(France) Pascal Gastien	(France) Florent Ogier	Uhlsport	Staffmatch, Puy-de-Dôme, Crédit Mutuel	Auvergne-Rhône-Alpes (H), Pingeon & Fils	Radio SCOOP	Systèmes Solaires
Le Havre	(United States) Vincent Volpe	(Slovenia) Luka Elsner	(Senegal) Arouna Sangante	Joma	Winamax, SIM Agences d'emploi	SOL'S	None	Geodis
Lens	(France) Joseph Oughourlian	(France) Franck Haise	(France) Brice Samba	Puma	Auchan, Groupe Lempereur, Smart Good Things	Randstad, Winamax	Aushopping Noyelles/Winamax (in UEFA matches)	Pas-de-Calais, McDonald's
Lille	(France) Olivier Létang	(Portugal) Paulo Fonseca	(France) Benjamin André	New Balance	Boulanger, RIKA, Actual Group	Essalmi, Teddy Smith	Aushopping V2	Winamax, Blåkläder
Lorient	(France) Loïc Féry	(France) Régis Le Bris	(France) Laurent Abergel	Umbro	Jean Floc'h, Acadomia, Breizh Cola	KarrGreen, MA Pièces Autos Bretagne	Actual Group	BMW/Mousqueton, B&B Hotels
Lyon	(United States) John Textor	(France) Pierre Sage	(France) Alexandre Lacazette	Adidas	Emirates	Aushopping, Groupe ALILA	MG Motor	Staffmatch
Marseille	(Spain) Pablo Longoria	(France) Jean-Louis Gasset	(France) Valentin Rongier	Puma	CMA CGM, Parions Sport	Boulanger	D'Or et de Platine	Sublime Côte d'Ivoire
Metz	(France) Bernard Serin	(Romania) László Bölöni	(France) Matthieu Udol	Kappa	Car Avenue (H), MOSL Mosselle Sans Limite, Malezieux, Axia Interim	Technitoit, Nacon	Eurométropole de Metz	E.Leclerc Moselle, LCR
Monaco	(Russia) Dmitry Rybolovlev	(Austria) Adi Hütter	(France) Wissam Ben Yedder	Kappa	Visit Monaco/APM Monaco, Triangle Intérim	Bang & Olufsen, Royal Caribbean International	Yomoni	VBET, Teddy Smith
Montpellier	(France) Laurent Nicollin	(Armenia) Michel Der Zakarian	(France) Téji Savanier	Nike	Partouche, FAUN-Environnement, Montpellier Métropole	FAUN-Environnement	Loxam	Système U, Viwone
Nantes	(Poland) Waldemar Kita	(France) Antoine Kombouaré	(Spain) Pedro Chirivella	Macron	Synergie, Groupe AFD, Proginov	Préservation du Patrimoine, Groupe Millet	LNA Santé	ZEbet, Be Green
Nice	(France) Jean-Pierre Rivère	(Italy) Francesco Farioli	(Brazil) Dante	Le Coq Sportif	Ineos	Ineos Grenadier	Ineos Science + Performance	VBET
Paris Saint-Germain	(Qatar) Nasser Al-Khelaifi	(Spain) Luis Enrique	(Brazil) Marquinhos	Nike	Qatar Airways	None	GOAT	None
Reims	(France) Jean-Pierre Caillot	(Mali) Samba Diawara (caretaker)	(Morocco) Yunis Abdelhamid	Umbro	Hexaom, EVA Air, Crédit Agricole Nord Est	Transports Caillot, Ebury	Triangle Intérim, Grand Reims/Reims	Winamax, Würth Modyf
Rennes	(France) Olivier Cloarec	(France) Julien Stéphan	(France) Steve Mandanda	Puma	Samsic, Del Arte, Groupe Launay, Association ELA	Winamax, Blot Immobilier	Groupe ROSE	Convivio
Strasbourg	(France) Marc Keller	(France) Patrick Vieira	(France) Frederic Guilbert	Adidas	ÉS Énergies (H)/Winamax (A & 3), Hager Group, Pierre Schmidt (H)/Stoeffler (A & 3)	Winamax (H)/ÉS Énergies (A & 3), Soprema	Würth	Atheo
Toulouse	(France) Damien Comolli	(Spain) Carles Martínez Novell	(Switzerland) Vincent Sierro	Craft	LP Promotion Group	Newrest	GLS Group	Sud de France

=== Managerial changes ===
Team	Outgoing manager	Manner of departure	Date of vacancy	Position in table	Incoming manager	Date of appointment
Marseille	(Croatia) Igor Tudor	Resigned	1 June 2023	Pre-season	(Spain) Marcelino	23 June 2023
Monaco	(Belgium) Philippe Clement	Sacked	4 June 2023	Pre-season	(Austria) Adi Hütter	4 July 2023
Toulouse	(France) Philippe Montanier	Sacked	14 June 2023	Pre-season	(Spain) Carles Martínez Novell	14 June 2023
Strasbourg	(France) Frédéric Antonetti	Resigned	27 June 2023	Pre-season	(France) Patrick Vieira	30 June 2023
Nice	(France) Didier Digard	End of interim spell	1 July 2023	Pre-season	(Italy) Francesco Farioli	1 July 2023
Paris Saint-Germain	(France) Christophe Galtier	Sacked	5 July 2023	Pre-season	(Spain) Luis Enrique	5 July 2023
Lyon	(France) Laurent Blanc	Sacked	8 September 2023	18th	(Italy) Fabio Grosso	16 September 2023
Marseille	(Spain) Marcelino	Resigned	20 September 2023	3rd	(Italy) Gennaro Gattuso	27 September 2023
Rennes	(France) Bruno Génésio	Resigned	19 November 2023	13th	(France) Julien Stéphan	19 November 2023
Nantes	(France) Pierre Aristouy	Sacked	28 November 2023	11th	(France) Jocelyn Gourvennec	29 November 2023
Lyon	(Italy) Fabio Grosso	Sacked	30 November 2023	18th	(France) Pierre Sage	30 November 2023
Marseille	(Italy) Gennaro Gattuso	Sacked	19 February 2024	9th	(France) Jean-Louis Gasset	20 February 2024
Nantes	(France) Jocelyn Gourvennec	Sacked	17 March 2024	16th	(France) Antoine Kombouaré	17 March 2024
Reims	(Belgium) Will Still	Mutual consent	2 May 2024	11th	(Mali) Samba Diawara (caretaker)	3 May 2024

== League table ==
Pos	Team	Pld	W	D	L	GF	GA	GD	Pts	Qualification or relegation
1	Paris Saint-Germain (C)	34	22	10	2	81	33	+48	76	Qualification for the Champions League league phase
2	Monaco	34	20	7	7	68	42	+26	67	Qualification for the Champions League league phase
3	Brest	34	17	10	7	53	34	+19	61	Qualification for the Champions League league phase
4	Lille	34	16	11	7	52	34	+18	59	Qualification for the Champions League third qualifying round
5	Nice	34	15	10	9	40	29	+11	55	Qualification for the Europa League league phase (Note: Since the 2023–24 Coupe de France winners, Paris Saint-Germain, qualified for the Champions League via league position, the Europa League berth awarded to the cup winners was passed to the sixth-placed team and the Conference League berth was passed to the seventh-placed team.)
6	Lyon	34	16	5	13	49	55	−6	53	Qualification for the Europa League league phase
7	Lens	34	14	9	11	45	37	+8	51	Qualification for the Conference League play-off round
8	Marseille	34	13	11	10	52	41	+11	50	
9	Reims	34	13	8	13	42	47	−5	47	
10	Rennes	34	12	10	12	53	46	+7	46	
11	Toulouse	34	11	10	13	42	46	−4	43	
12	Montpellier (Note: Montpellier was deducted one point for uncontrolled crowd trouble that caused the abandonment of its match against Clermont.)	34	10	12	12	43	48	−5	41	
13	Strasbourg	34	10	9	15	38	50	−12	39	
14	Nantes	34	9	6	19	30	55	−25	33	
15	Le Havre	34	7	11	16	34	45	−11	32	
16	Metz (R)	34	8	5	21	35	58	−23	29 (Note: Metz finished ahead of Lorient on head-to-head away goals scored: Lorient 2–3 Metz, Metz 1–2 Lorient.)	Qualification for the Relegation play-offs
17	Lorient (R)	34	7	8	19	43	66	−23	29	Relegation to Ligue 2
18	Clermont (R)	34	5	10	19	26	60	−34	25	Relegation to Ligue 2

Source: Ligue 1
Rules for classification: 1) Points; 2) Goal difference; 3) Head-to-head points; 4) Head-to-head goal difference; 5) Head-to-head goals scored; 6) Head-to-head away goals scored; 7) Goals scored; 8) Away goals scored; 9) Fair-play points (Note: Head-to-head record is used only after all the matches between the teams in question have been played).
(C) Champions; (R) Relegated

== Results ==
Home \ Away	BRE	CLE	HAC	LEN	LIL	LOR	OL	OM	MET	ASM	MON	FCN	NIC	PSG	REI	REN	STR	TFC
Brest	—	3–0	1–0	3–2	1–1	4–0	1–0	1–0	4–3	0–2	2–0	0–0	0–0	2–3	1–1	0–0	1–1	1–1
Clermont	1–1	—	2–1	0–3	0–0	1–0	0–1	1–5	0–1	2–4	1–1	0–1	0–1	0–0	4–1	1–3	1–1	0–3
Le Havre	1–2	2–1	—	0–0	0–2	3–0	3–1	1–2	0–1	0–0	0–2	0–1	3–1	0–2	1–2	0–1	3–1	1–0
Lens	1–0	1–0	1–1	—	1–1	2–0	3–2	1–0	0–1	2–3	2–2	4–0	1–3	0–2	2–0	1–1	3–1	2–1
Lille	1–0	4–0	3–0	2–1	—	3–0	3–4	3–1	2–0	2–0	1–0	2–0	2–2	1–1	1–2	2–2	1–0	1–1
Lorient	0–1	5–0	3–3	0–0	4–1	—	0–2	2–4	2–3	2–2	0–3	0–1	1–1	1–4	2–0	2–1	1–2	1–2
Lyon	4–3	1–2	0–0	0–3	0–2	3–3	—	1–0	1–1	3–2	1–4	1–0	1–0	1–4	1–1	2–3	2–1	3–0
Marseille	2–0	2–1	3–0	2–1	0–0	3–1	3–0	—	1–1	2–2	4–1	2–0	2–2	0–2	2–1	2–0	1–1	0–0
Metz	0–1	1–0	0–0	2–1	1–2	1–2	1–2	2–2	—	2–5	0–1	3–1	0–1	0–2	2–2	2–3	0–1	0–1
Monaco	2–0	4–1	1–1	3–0	1–0	2–2	0–1	3–2	2–1	—	2–0	4–0	0–1	0–0	1–3	1–0	3–0	1–2
Montpellier	1–3	1–1	2–2	0–0	0–0	2–0	1–2	1–1	3–0	0–2	—	1–1	0–0	2–6	1–3	0–0	2–2	3–0
Nantes	0–2	1–2	0–0	0–1	1–2	5–3	1–3	1–1	0–2	3–3	2–0	—	1–0	0–2	0–1	0–3	1–3	1–2
Nice	0–0	0–0	1–0	2–0	1–1	3–0	0–0	1–0	1–0	2–3	1–2	1–2	—	1–2	2–1	2–0	2–0	1–0
Paris SG	2–2	1–1	3–3	3–1	3–1	0–0	4–1	4–0	3–1	5–2	3–0	2–1	2–3	—	2–2	1–1	3–0	1–3
Reims	1–2	2–0	1–0	1–1	0–1	1–0	2–0	1–0	2–1	1–3	1–2	0–0	0–0	0–3	—	2–1	2–1	2–3
Rennes	4–5	3–1	2–2	1–1	2–2	1–2	0–1	2–0	5–1	1–2	2–1	3–1	2–0	1–3	3–1	—	1–1	1–2
Strasbourg	0–3	0–0	2–1	0–1	2–1	1–3	2–1	1–1	2–1	0–1	2–2	1–2	1–3	1–2	3–1	2–0	—	2–0
Toulouse	0–3	2–2	1–2	0–2	3–1	1–1	2–3	2–2	3–0	1–2	1–2	1–2	2–1	1–1	1–1	0–0	0–0	—

Source: Ligue 1
Legend: Blue = home team win; Yellow = draw; Red = away team win.
For upcoming matches, an "a" indicates there is an article about the rivalry between the two participants.

== Relegation play-offs ==
The 2023–24 season ended with a relegation play-off between the 16th-placed Ligue 1 team, Metz, and the winner of the semi-final of the Ligue 2 play-off, Saint-Étienne, on a two-legged confrontation.

1st leg

30 May 2024
20:30 CEST (UTC+2)

Saint-Étienne	2–1	Metz
Sissoko 19'; Cardona 80'	Report	Traoré 45'

Stade Geoffroy-Guichard, Saint-Étienne
Attendance: 35,356
Referee: Benoît Millot

2nd leg

2 June 2024
17:00 CEST (UTC+2)

Metz	2–2 (a.e.t.)	Saint-Étienne
Camara 17'; Mikautadze 25' (pen.)	Report	Pétrot 35'; Wadji 116'

Stade Saint-Symphorien, Metz
Attendance: 28,500
Referee: Jérôme Brisard

Saint-Étienne won 4–3 on aggregate and were promoted to Ligue 1, while Metz were relegated to Ligue 2.

== Season statistics ==
=== Top goalscorers ===
Rank	Player	Club	Goals
1	(France) Kylian Mbappé	Paris Saint-Germain	27
2	(Canada) Jonathan David	Lille	19
2	(France) Alexandre Lacazette	Lyon	19
4	(Gabon) Pierre-Emerick Aubameyang	Marseille	17
5	(France) Wissam Ben Yedder	Monaco	16
6	(Netherlands) Thijs Dallinga	Toulouse	14
7	(Georgia (country)) Georges Mikautadze	Metz	13
8	(Nigeria) Terem Moffi	Nice	11
8	(Portugal) Gonçalo Ramos	Paris Saint-Germain	11
10	(France) Arnaud Kalimuendo	Rennes	10

=== Hat-tricks ===
Player	Club	Against	Result	Date
(France) Kylian Mbappé	Paris Saint-Germain	Reims	3–0 (A)	11 November 2023
(France) Alexandre Lacazette	Lyon	Toulouse	3–0 (H)	10 December 2023
(Mali) Kamory Doumbia^{4}	Brest	Lorient	4–0 (H)	20 December 2023
(Canada) Jonathan David	Lille	Le Havre	3–0 (H)	17 February 2024
(France) Mahdi Camara	Brest	Strasbourg	3–0 (A)	24 February 2024
(France) Kylian Mbappé	Paris Saint-Germain	Montpellier	6–2 (A)	17 March 2024

Note

^{4} Player scored 4 goals

=== Clean sheets ===
Rank	Player	Club	Clean sheets
1	(Poland) Marcin Bułka	Nice	17
2	(France) Lucas Chevalier	Lille	15
3	(France) Brice Samba	Lens	14
4	(Netherlands) Marco Bizot	Brest	13
5	(Italy) Gianluigi Donnarumma	Paris Saint-Germain	10
5	(France) Benjamin Lecomte	Montpellier	10
7	(Portugal) Anthony Lopes	Lyon	9
8	(France) Yehvann Diouf	Reims	8
9	(France) Arthur Desmas	Le Havre	7
9	(France) Alban Lafont	Nantes	7
9	(Spain) Pau López	Marseille	7
9	(Poland) Radosław Majecki	Monaco	7
9	(France) Steve Mandanda	Rennes	7

=== Discipline ===
==== Player ====
- Most yellow cards: 11
  - (Argentina) Facundo Medina (Lens)
  - (France) Pierre Lees-Melou (Brest)
  - (Switzerland) Denis Zakaria (Monaco)
- Most red cards: 2
  - (Belgium) Maximiliano Caufriez (Clermont)
  - (France) Samuel Grandsir (Le Havre)
  - (Senegal) Rassoul Ndiaye (Le Havre)
  - (Kosovo) Elbasan Rashani (Clermont)
  - (Switzerland) Denis Zakaria (Monaco)

==== Team ====
- Most yellow cards: 80
  - Brest
- Most red cards: 8
  - Monaco
- Fewest yellow cards: 49
  - Paris Saint-Germain
- Fewest red cards: 1
  - Lorient
  - Toulouse

== Awards ==
=== Monthly ===
Month	Player of the Month		Ref.
Month	Player	Club	Ref.
August	(Japan) Takumi Minamino	Monaco	
September	(Poland) Marcin Bułka	Nice	
October	(France) Kylian Mbappé	Paris Saint-Germain	
November	(France) Kylian Mbappé	Paris Saint-Germain	
December	(Gabon) Pierre-Emerick Aubameyang	Marseille	
January	(France) Martin Terrier	Rennes	
February	(France) Pierre Lees-Melou	Brest	
March	(Kosovo) Edon Zhegrova	Lille	
April	(France) Alexandre Lacazette	Lyon	

=== Annual ===
Award	Winner	Club	Ref.
Player of the Season	(France) Kylian Mbappé	Paris Saint-Germain	
Young Player of the Season	(France) Warren Zaïre-Emery	Paris Saint-Germain	
Goalkeeper of the Season	(Italy) Gianluigi Donnarumma	Paris Saint-Germain	
Goal of the Season	(Mali) Kamory Doumbia	Brest	
Manager of the Season	(France) Éric Roy	Brest	

Team of the Year
Goalkeeper	(Italy) Gianluigi Donnarumma (Paris Saint-Germain)			
Defenders	(Morocco) Achraf Hakimi (Paris Saint-Germain)	(Brazil) Marquinhos (Paris Saint-Germain)	(France) Leny Yoro (Lille)	(France) Bradley Locko (Brest)
Midfielders	(Portugal) Vitinha (Paris Saint-Germain)	(France) Pierre Lees-Melou (Brest)		(France) Warren Zaïre-Emery (Paris Saint-Germain)
Forwards	(France) Ousmane Dembélé (Paris Saint-Germain)	(Gabon) Pierre-Emerick Aubameyang (Marseille)		(France) Kylian Mbappé (Paris Saint-Germain)

== Attendances ==
Olympique de Marseille drew the highest average home attendance in the 2023-24 edition of the Ligue 1.

#	Football club	Home games	Average attendance
1	Olympique de Marseille	17	60,799
2	Paris Saint-Germain	17	47,316
3	Olympique Lyonnais	17	43,642
4	Lille OSC	17	39,943
5	RC Lens	17	37,707
6	Stade Rennais	17	27,663
7	FC Nantes	17	27,555
8	Toulouse FC	17	25,802
9	RC Strasbourg	17	25,359
10	OGC Nice	17	24,952
11	FC Metz	17	23,838
12	Havre AC	17	21,879
13	FC Lorient	17	15,676
14	Stade de Reims	17	15,669
15	Stade Brestois 29	17	15,391
16	Montpellier HSC	17	13,901
17	Clermont Foot	17	9,772
18	AS Monaco	17	7,436
