= 2024–25 Ligue 1 =

Ligue 1
- Season: 2024–25
- Dates: 16 August 2024 – 17 May 2025
- Champions: Paris Saint-Germain; 13th Ligue 1 title 13th French title
- Relegated: Reims (via play-off); Saint-Étienne; Montpellier
- Champions League: Paris Saint-Germain; Marseille; Monaco; Nice
- Europa League: Lille; Lyon
- Conference League: Strasbourg
- Matches: 306
- Goals: 911 (2.98 per match)
- Top goalscorer: Ousmane Dembélé; Mason Greenwood (21 goals each)
- Biggest home win: Nice 8–0 Saint-Étienne (20 September 2024)
- Biggest away win: Montpellier 0–5 Marseille (20 October 2024); Saint-Étienne 1–6 Paris Saint-Germain (29 March 2025)
- Highest scoring: Nice 8–0 Saint-Étienne (20 September 2024); Monaco 7–1 Nantes (15 February 2025)
- Longest winning run: Paris Saint-Germain (10 matches)
- Longest unbeaten run: Paris Saint-Germain (30 matches)
- Longest winless run: Montpellier; Reims (15 matches)
- Longest losing run: Montpellier (11 matches)
- Highest attendance: 66,312; Marseille 5–1 Montpellier (19 April 2025)
- Lowest attendance: 5,336; Monaco 4–2 Auxerre (1 February 2025)
- Attendance: 8,519,028 (27,840 per match)

The 2024–25 Ligue 1, also known as Ligue 1 McDonald's for sponsorship reasons, is the 87th season of the Ligue 1 (French first division of football) , but the first for McDonald's sponsorship in the French premier football competition. It began on 16 August 2024 and concluded on 17 May 2025. The relegation play-off was played on 21 and 29 May 2025.

Paris Saint-Germain were the three-time defending champions, and mathematically secured a record-extending thirteenth title with six matches to spare on 5 April 2025, following a 1–0 win against Angers.

== Teams ==
A total of eighteen teams participated in the 2024–25 edition of the Ligue 1. Auxerre and Angers (who both returned to the top flight after one year's absence) were promoted after finishing first and second in the 2023–24 Ligue 2, respectively, and Saint-Étienne (who returned to the top flight after two years absence) was promoted after winning a play-off against Metz. They replaced Metz, Lorient and Clermont (relegated after one, four and three years in the top flight, respectively), who were relegated to 2024–25 Ligue 2.

=== Changes ===
▲ from 2023–24 Ligue 2	▼ to 2024–25 Ligue 2
Auxerre; Angers; Saint-Étienne (Play-off)	Metz (Play-off); Lorient; Clermont

=== Stadiums and locations ===
Location of teams in 2024–25 Ligue 1

Club	Location	Venue	Capacity	2023–24 season
Angers	Angers	Stade Raymond Kopa	18,752	Ligue 2, 2nd
Auxerre	Auxerre	Stade Abbé Deschamps	21,379	Ligue 2, 1st
Brest	Brest	Stade Francis-Le Blé	15,931	3rd
Le Havre	Le Havre	Stade Océane	25,178	15th
Lens	Lens	Stade Bollaert-Delelis	37,705	7th
Lille	Villeneuve-d'Ascq	Decathlon Arena Pierre Mauroy Stadium	50,186	4th
Lyon	Décines-Charpieu	Groupama Stadium	59,186	6th
Marseille	Marseille	Orange Vélodrome	67,394	8th
Monaco	Monaco	Stade Louis II	18,523	2nd
Montpellier	Montpellier	Stade de la Mosson	32,900	12th
Nantes	Nantes	Stade de la Beaujoire	35,322	14th
Nice	Nice	Allianz Riviera	35,624	5th
Paris Saint-Germain	Paris	Parc des Princes	47,926	1st
Reims	Reims	Stade Auguste Delaune	21,684	9th
Rennes	Rennes	Roazhon Park	29,778	10th
Strasbourg	Strasbourg	Stade de la Meinau	29,230	13th
Saint-Étienne	Saint-Étienne	Stade Geoffroy Guichard	41,965	Ligue 2, 3rd
Toulouse	Toulouse	Stadium de Toulouse	33,150	11th

=== Personnel and kits ===
Team	Chairman	Manager	Captain	Kit maker	Sponsors	
Team	Chairman	Manager	Captain	Kit maker	Main	Other(s)
Angers	(France) Romain Chabane	(France) Alexandre Dujeux	(France) Pierrick Capelle	Nike	École Noir&Blanc	List: Front: Maison de l'Atoll, Angers; Back: None; Sleeves: None; Shorts: Système U; Socks: None
Auxerre	(France) Baptiste Malherbe	(France) Christophe Pélissier	(Brazil) Jubal	Macron	Acadomia	List: Front: X1, SPPE, Servistores; Back: LCR, X1; Sleeves: Groupama; Shorts: Auxerre, Advise, Actis Location; Socks: None
Brest	(France) Denis Le Saint	(France) Eric Roy	(France) Brendan Chardonnet	Adidas	Quéguiner Matériaux (H)/Yaourt Malo (H in UEFA matches, A & 3)	List: Front: SILL (H)/Breizh Cola (A & 3), GUYOT Environnement, Oceania Hotels, Fée du Bonheur; Back: Oriance, J.Bervas Automobiles; Sleeves: Quéguiner Matériaux (in UEFA matches); Shorts: E.Leclerc, Groupe SOFT; Socks: BSP Sécurité
Le Havre	(United States) Vincent Volpe	(France) Didier Digard	(Senegal) Arouna Sangante	Joma	Winamax	List: Front: SIM Agences d'emploi; Back: SOL'S; Sleeves: None; Shorts: Geodis, Kia Groupe Saint-Clair; Socks: BSP Sécurité
Lens	(France) Joseph Oughourlian	(Belgium) Will Still	(France) Florian Sotoca	Puma	Auchan	List: Front: Groupe Lempereur, Nexans; Back: Randstad, Winamax; Sleeves: Aushopping Noyelles/Winamax (in UEFA matches); Shorts: Boulanger, McDonald's; Socks: None
Lille	(France) Olivier Létang	(France) Bruno Génésio	(France) Benjamin André	New Balance	Boulanger	List: Front: RIKA, Actual Group; Back: Essalmi, Teddy Smith; Sleeves: Aushopping V2; Shorts: Winamax, Blåkläder; Socks: None
Lyon	(United States) John Textor	(Portugal) Paulo Fonseca / (Portugal) Jorge Maciel (caretaker)	(France) Alexandre Lacazette	Adidas	Emirates	List: Front: None; Back: Aushopping; Sleeves: MG Motor; Shorts: Staffmatch; Socks: None
Marseille	(Spain) Pablo Longoria	(Italy) Roberto De Zerbi	(Argentina) Leonardo Balerdi	Puma	CMA CGM	List: Front: Parions Sport; Back: Boulanger; Sleeves: D'Or et de Platine; Shorts: Sublime Côte d'Ivoire; Socks: None
Monaco	(Russia) Dmitry Rybolovlev	(Austria) Adi Hütter	(Switzerland) Denis Zakaria	Kappa	APM Monaco/Renault 5 E-Tech (in UEFA matches)	List: Front: Triangle Intérim, Renault 5 E-Tech; Back: Bang & Olufsen, Teddy Smith; Sleeves: Bang & Olufsen (in UEFA matches); Shorts: VBET, Fom Industrie; Socks: None
Montpellier	(France) Laurent Nicollin	(France) Zoumana Camara	(France) Benjamin Lecomte	Nike	Swile	List: Front: FAUN-Environnement, Montpellier Métropole, Big M Burger; Back: FAUN-Environnement, Kaporal Jeans; Sleeves: Loxam; Shorts: Viwone; Socks: None
Nantes	(Poland) Waldemar Kita	(France) Antoine Kombouaré	(Spain) Pedro Chirivella	Macron	Synergie	List: Front: Les Gars Des Eaux; Back: Préservation du Patrimoine, Groupe Millet; Sleeves: LNA Santé; Shorts: Be Green; Socks: None
Nice	(France) Jean-Pierre Rivère	(France) Franck Haise	(Brazil) Dante	Le Coq Sportif	Ineos	List: Front: Les Gars Des Eaux; Back: Ineos Grenadier; Sleeves: JD Sports; Shorts: VBET; Socks: None
Paris Saint-Germain	(Qatar) Nasser Al-Khelaifi	(Spain) Luis Enrique	(Brazil) Marquinhos	Nike	Qatar Airways	List: Front: None; Back: Snipes; Sleeves: None; Shorts: None; Socks: None
Reims	(France) Jean-Pierre Caillot	(Mali) Samba Diawara	(Malta) Teddy Teuma	Puma	Yasuda Group	List: Front: EVA Air, Crédit Agricole Nord Est; Back: Transports Caillot, Winamax; Sleeves: Triangle Intérim, Grand Reims (H)/Reims (A); Shorts: Würth Modyf; Socks: None
Rennes	(France) Olivier Cloarec	(Senegal) Habib Beye	(France) Steve Mandanda	Puma	Samsic	List: Front: Groupe Launay, Association ELA; Back: Winamax, Blot Immobilier; Sleeves: Groupe ROSE; Shorts: BWT; Socks: None
Saint-Étienne	(Greece) Ivan Gazidis	(Norway) Eirik Horneland	(France) Anthony Briançon	Hummel	Kelyps Intérim	List: Front: Loire, BYmyCAR, Terroir Halles; Back: Siléane; Sleeves: None; Shorts: Kapriol, Desjoyaux; Socks: None
Strasbourg	(France) Marc Keller	(England) Liam Rosenior	(Senegal) Habib Diarra	Adidas	Électricité de Strasbourg (H)/Winamax (A & 3)	List: Front: Hager Group, Pierre Schmidt (H)/Stoeffler (A & 3); Back: Winamax (H)/Électricité de Strasbourg (A & 3), Soprema; Sleeves: Würth; Shorts: Atheo Ingenierie; Socks: None
Toulouse	(France) Damien Comolli	(Spain) Carles Martínez Novell	(Switzerland) Vincent Sierro	Nike	LP Promotion Group	List: Front: None; Back: Newrest; Sleeves: None; Shorts: Sud de France; Socks: None

=== Managerial changes ===
Team	Outgoing manager	Manner of departure	Date of vacancy	Position in table	Incoming manager	Date of appointment
Reims	(Mali) Samba Diawara	End of caretaker spell	19 May 2024	Pre-season	(Slovenia) Luka Elsner	25 June 2024
Marseille	(France) Jean-Louis Gasset	Retired	20 May 2024	Pre-season	(Italy) Roberto De Zerbi	1 July 2024
Nice	(Italy) Francesco Farioli	Signed by Ajax	23 May 2024	Pre-season	(France) Franck Haise	1 July 2024
Lille	(Portugal) Paulo Fonseca	Mutual consent	5 June 2024	Pre-season	(France) Bruno Génésio	1 July 2024
Lens	(France) Franck Haise	Signed by Nice	6 June 2024	Pre-season	(Belgium) Will Still	10 June 2024
Le Havre	(Slovenia) Luka Elsner	Signed by Reims	25 June 2024	Pre-season	(France) Didier Digard	1 July 2024
Strasbourg	(France) Patrick Vieira	Mutual consent	18 July 2024	Pre-season	(England) Liam Rosenior	25 July 2024
Montpellier	(Armenia) Michel Der Zakarian	Sacked	20 October 2024	18th	(France) Jean-Louis Gasset	22 October 2024
Rennes	(France) Julien Stéphan	Sacked	7 November 2024	13th	(Argentina) Jorge Sampaoli	11 November 2024
Saint-Étienne	(France) Olivier Dall'Oglio	Sacked	14 December 2024	16th	(Norway) Eirik Horneland	20 December 2024
Lyon	(France) Pierre Sage	Sacked	27 January 2025	6th	(Portugal) Paulo Fonseca	31 January 2025
Rennes	(Argentina) Jorge Sampaoli	Sacked	30 January 2025	16th	(Senegal) Habib Beye	30 January 2025
Reims	(Slovenia) Luka Elsner	Sacked	3 February 2025	13th	(Mali) Samba Diawara	3 February 2025
Lyon	(Portugal) Paulo Fonseca	Suspended	5 March 2025	6th	(Portugal) Jorge Maciel (caretaker)	6 March 2025
Montpellier	(France) Jean-Louis Gasset	Sacked	7 April 2025	18th	(France) Zoumana Camara	8 April 2025

== League table ==
Pos	Team	Pld	W	D	L	GF	GA	GD	Pts	Qualification or relegation
1	Paris Saint-Germain (C)	34	26	6	2	92	35	+57	84	Qualification for the Champions League league phase
2	Marseille	34	20	5	9	74	47	+27	65	Qualification for the Champions League league phase
3	Monaco	34	18	7	9	63	41	+22	61	Qualification for the Champions League league phase
4	Nice	34	17	9	8	66	41	+25	60	Qualification for the Champions League third qualifying round
5	Lille	34	17	9	8	52	36	+16	60	Qualification for the Europa League league phase (Note: Since the 2024–25 Coupe de France winners, Paris Saint-Germain, qualified for the Champions League via league position, the Europa League berth awarded to the cup winners was passed to the sixth-placed team and the Conference League berth was passed to the seventh-placed team.)
6	Lyon	34	17	6	11	65	46	+19	57	Qualification for the Europa League league phase
7	Strasbourg	34	16	9	9	56	44	+12	57	Qualification for the Conference League play-off round
8	Lens	34	15	7	12	42	39	+3	52	
9	Brest	34	15	5	14	52	59	−7	50	
10	Toulouse	34	11	9	14	44	43	+1	42	
11	Auxerre	34	11	9	14	48	51	−3	42	
12	Rennes	34	13	2	19	51	50	+1	41	
13	Nantes	34	8	12	14	39	52	−13	36	
14	Angers	34	10	6	18	32	53	−21	36	
15	Le Havre	34	10	4	20	40	71	−31	34	
16	Reims (R)	34	8	9	17	33	47	−14	33	Qualification for the relegation play-offs
17	Saint-Étienne (R)	34	8	6	20	39	77	−38	30	Relegation to Ligue 2
18	Montpellier (R)	34	4	4	26	23	79	−56	16	Relegation to Ligue 2

Source: Ligue 1
Rules for classification: 1) Points; 2) Goal difference; 3) Head-to-head points; 4) Head-to-head goal difference; 5) Head-to-head goals scored; 6) Head-to-head away goals scored; 7) Goals scored; 8) Away goals scored; 9) Fair-play points (Note: Head-to-head record is used only after all the matches between the teams in question have been played).
(C) Champions; (R) Relegated

== Results ==
Home \ Away	ANG	AUX	BRE	HAC	LEN	LIL	OL	OM	ASM	MON	FCN	NIC	PSG	REI	REN	STE	STR	TFC
Angers	—	2–0	2–0	1–1	0–1	0–2	0–3	0–2	0–2	2–0	1–1	1–4	2–4	1–3	0–3	4–2	2–1	0–4
Auxerre	1–0	—	3–0	1–2	2–2	0–0	1–3	3–0	0–3	1–0	1–1	2–1	0–0	2–1	4–0	1–1	0–1	2–2
Brest	2–0	2–2	—	2–0	1–3	2–0	2–1	1–5	2–1	1–0	4–1	0–1	2–5	0–0	1–1	4–0	3–1	2–0
Le Havre	0–1	3–1	0–1	—	1–2	0–3	0–4	1–3	1–1	1–0	3–2	1–3	1–4	0–3	1–5	1–1	0–3	1–4
Lens	1–0	0–4	2–0	3–4	—	0–2	0–0	1–3	4–0	2–0	3–2	0–0	1–2	0–2	1–0	1–0	0–2	0–1
Lille	2–0	3–1	3–1	1–2	1–0	—	1–1	1–1	2–1	1–0	1–1	2–1	1–3	2–1	1–0	4–1	3–3	2–1
Lyon	2–0	2–2	2–1	4–2	1–2	2–1	—	2–3	0–2	1–0	2–0	4–1	2–3	4–0	4–1	1–0	4–3	0–0
Marseille	1–1	1–3	4–1	5–1	0–1	1–1	3–2	—	2–1	5–1	2–0	2–0	0–3	2–2	4–2	5–1	1–1	3–2
Monaco	0–1	4–2	3–2	3–1	1–1	0–0	2–0	3–0	—	2–1	7–1	2–1	2–4	3–0	3–2	1–0	0–0	2–0
Montpellier	1–3	3–2	3–1	0–2	0–2	2–2	1–4	0–5	2–1	—	1–3	2–2	1–4	0–0	0–4	0–2	1–1	0–3
Nantes	0–1	2–0	0–2	0–2	3–1	1–0	1–1	1–2	2–2	3–0	—	1–1	1–1	1–2	1–0	2–2	0–1	0–0
Nice	2–1	1–1	6–0	2–1	2–0	2–2	0–2	2–0	2–1	2–0	1–2	—	1–1	1–0	3–2	8–0	2–1	1–1
Paris SG	1–0	3–1	3–1	2–1	1–0	4–1	3–1	3–1	4–1	6–0	1–1	1–3	—	1–1	3–1	2–1	4–2	3–0
Reims	0–1	0–2	1–2	1–1	0–2	0–2	1–1	3–1	0–0	4–2	1–2	2–4	1–1	—	2–1	0–2	0–1	1–0
Rennes	2–0	0–1	1–2	1–0	1–1	0–2	3–0	1–2	1–2	3–0	2–1	2–0	1–4	1–0	—	5–0	1–0	0–2
Saint-Étienne	3–3	3–1	3–3	0–2	0–2	1–0	2–1	0–2	1–3	1–0	1–1	1–3	1–6	3–1	0–2	—	2–0	2–3
Strasbourg	1–1	3–1	0–0	2–3	2–2	2–1	4–2	1–0	1–3	2–0	3–1	2–2	2–1	0–0	3–1	3–1	—	2–1
Toulouse	1–1	2–0	2–4	2–0	1–1	1–2	1–2	1–3	1–1	1–2	0–0	1–1	0–1	1–0	2–1	2–1	1–2	—

Source: Ligue 1
Legend: Blue = home team win; Yellow = draw; Red = away team win.
For upcoming matches, an "a" indicates there is an article about the rivalry between the two participants.

== Relegation play-offs ==
The 2024–25 season concluded with a relegation play-off between the 16th-placed Ligue 1 team, Reims, and the winner of the semi-final of the Ligue 2 play-off, Metz, in a two-legged confrontation.

1st leg

21 May 2025
20:00 CEST (UTC+2)

Metz	1–1	Reims
Udol 38'	Report	Kipré 52'

Stade Saint-Symphorien, Longeville-lès-Metz
Attendance: 27,767
Referee: Hakim Ben El Hadj

2nd leg

29 May 2025
20:30 CEST (UTC+2)

Reims	1–3 (a.e.t.)	Metz
Tia 57'	Report	Udol 78'; Touré 110'; Hein 114'

Stade Auguste-Delaune, Reims
Attendance: 20,392
Referee: Eric Wattellier

Metz won 4–2 on aggregate and were promoted to Ligue 1 while Reims was relegated to Ligue 2.

== Season statistics ==
=== Scoring ===
- First goal of the season:
  (South Korea) Lee Kang-in (Paris Saint-Germain) against Le Havre (16 August 2024)
- Last goal of the season:
  (Guinea) Abdoulaye Touré (Le Havre) against Strasbourg (17 May 2025)

=== Top goalscorers ===
Rank	Player	Club	Goals
1	(France) Ousmane Dembélé	Paris Saint-Germain	21
1	(England) Mason Greenwood	Marseille	21
3	(France) Arnaud Kalimuendo	Rennes	17
4	(Canada) Jonathan David	Lille	16
5	(France) Alexandre Lacazette	Lyon	15
6	(France) Bradley Barcola	Paris Saint-Germain	14
6	(Netherlands) Emanuel Emegha	Strasbourg	14
8	(France) Ludovic Ajorque	Brest	13
8	(Denmark) Mika Biereth	Monaco	13
8	(Algeria) Amine Gouiri	Rennes/Marseille	13

=== Hat-tricks ===
Player	Club	Against	Result	Date
(Canada) Jonathan David	Lille	Le Havre	3–0 (A)	28 September 2024
(Georgia (country)) Zuriko Davitashvili	Saint-Étienne	Auxerre	3–1 (H)	5 October 2024
(France) Arnaud Kalimuendo	Rennes	Saint-Étienne	5–0 (H)	30 November 2024
(France) Alexandre Lacazette	Lyon	Nice	4–1 (H)	1 December 2024
(France) Ousmane Dembélé	Paris Saint-Germain	Brest	5–2 (A)	1 February 2025
(Denmark) Mika Biereth	Monaco	Auxerre	4–2 (H)	1 February 2025
(Denmark) Mika Biereth	Monaco	Nantes	7–1 (H)	15 February 2025
(Denmark) Mika Biereth	Monaco	Reims	3–0 (H)	28 February 2025
(Algeria) Amine Gouiri	Marseille	Brest	4–1 (H)	27 April 2025
(Portugal) Gonçalo Ramos	Paris Saint-Germain	Montpellier	4–1 (A)	10 May 2025

=== Clean sheets ===
Rank	Player	Club	Clean sheets
1	(France) Brice Samba	Lens/Rennes	12
2	(France) Lucas Chevalier	Lille	11
3	(Netherlands) Marco Bizot	Brest	10
3	(Serbia) Đorđe Petrović	Strasbourg	10
3	(Brazil) Lucas Perri	Lyon	10
6	(French Guiana) Donovan Léon	Auxerre	9
6	(France) Guillaume Restes	Toulouse	9
9	(Poland) Marcin Bułka	Nice	8
9	(Switzerland) Philipp Köhn	Monaco	8
10	(Senegal) Yehvann Diouf	Reims	7
10	(Ivory Coast) Yahia Fofana	Angers	7

=== Discipline ===
==== Player ====
- Most yellow cards: 14
  - (Argentina) Facundo Medina (Lens)
- Most red cards: 2
  - (France) Melvin Bard (Nice)
  - (Guadeloupe) Marcus Coco (Nantes)
  - (Canada) Derek Cornelius (Marseille)
  - (France) Tanguy Coulibaly (Montpellier)
  - (Mali) Massadio Haïdara (Brest)
  - (Ivory Coast) Cédric Kipré (Reims)
  - (Colombia) Deiver Machado (Lens)
  - (France) Lilian Raolisoa (Angers)

==== Team ====
- Most yellow cards: 83
  - Lens
  - Montpellier
- Most red cards: 8
  - Lens
- Fewest yellow cards: 40
  - Paris Saint-Germain
- Fewest red cards: 0
  - Lyon
  - Paris Saint-Germain

== Awards ==
=== Monthly ===
Month	Player of the Month		Ref.
Month	Player	Club	Ref.
September	(France) Bradley Barcola	Paris Saint-Germain	
October	(Georgia (country)) Zuriko Davitashvili	Saint-Étienne	
November	(Canada) Jonathan David	Lille	
December	(England) Mason Greenwood	Marseille	
January	(France) Ousmane Dembélé	Paris Saint-Germain	
February	(Algeria) Amine Gouiri	Marseille	
March	(France) Désiré Doué	Paris Saint-Germain	
April	(England) Mason Greenwood	Marseille	

=== Annual ===
Award	Winner	Club	Ref.
Player of the Season	(France) Ousmane Dembélé	Paris Saint-Germain	
Young Player of the Season	(France) Désiré Doué	Paris Saint-Germain	
Goalkeeper of the Season	(France) Lucas Chevalier	Lille	
Goal of the Season	(Algeria) Amine Gouiri	Marseille	
Manager of the Season	(Spain) Luis Enrique	Paris Saint-Germain	

Team of the Year
Goalkeeper	(France) Lucas Chevalier (Lille)			
Defenders	(Morocco) Achraf Hakimi (Paris Saint-Germain)	(Brazil) Marquinhos (Paris Saint-Germain)	(Ecuador) Willian Pacho (Paris Saint-Germain)	(Portugal) Nuno Mendes (Paris Saint-Germain)
Midfielders	(Portugal) João Neves (Paris Saint-Germain)	(France) Rayan Cherki (Lyon)		(Portugal) Vitinha (Paris Saint-Germain)
Forwards	(France) Désiré Doué (Paris Saint-Germain)	(France) Ousmane Dembélé (Paris Saint-Germain)		(France) Bradley Barcola (Paris Saint-Germain)

== Attendances ==
Rank	Club	Home games	Average attendance
1	Marseille	17	63,553
2	Lyon	17	50,994
3	Paris Saint-Germain	17	47,603
4	Lille	17	42,417
5	Lens	17	37,936
6	Saint-Étienne	17	30,288
7	Nantes	17	30,269
8	Rennes	17	27,375
9	Toulouse	17	25,566
10	Nice	17	24,299
11	Le Havre	17	20,218
12	Strasbourg	17	19,380
13	Auxerre	17	16,634
14	Reims	17	15,659
15	Brest	17	14,655
16	Montpellier	17	13,544
17	Angers	17	13,132
18	Monaco	17	9,354

== See also ==
- 2024–25 Ligue 2
- 2024–25 Championnat National
- 2024–25 Championnat National 2
- 2024–25 Championnat National 3
- 2024–25 Coupe de France
