= 2021–22 Ligue 1 =

84th season of top-tier French football

Ligue 1
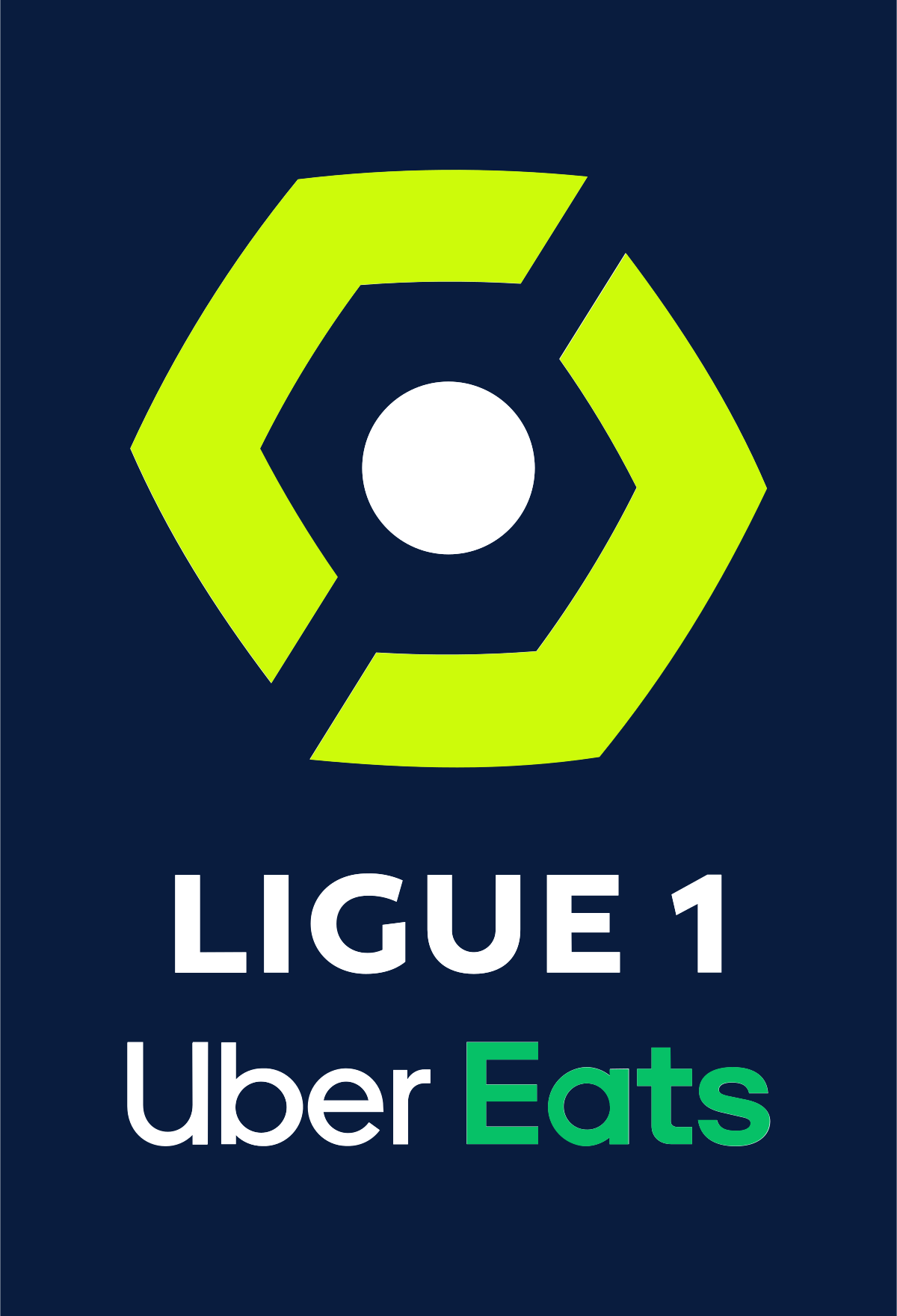
- Season: 2021–22
- Dates: 6 August 2021 – 21 May 2022
- Champions: Paris Saint-Germain; 10th Ligue 1 title 10th French title
- Relegated: Saint-Étienne; Metz; Bordeaux
- Champions League: Paris Saint-Germain; Marseille; Monaco
- Europa League: Nantes (as Coupe de France winners); Rennes
- Europa Conference League: Nice
- Matches: 380
- Goals: 1,067 (2.81 per match)
- Top goalscorer: Kylian Mbappé (28 goals)
- Biggest home win: Rennes 6–0 Clermont (22 September 2021); Rennes 6–0 Bordeaux (16 January 2022)
- Biggest away win: Saint-Étienne 0–5 Rennes (5 December 2021); Clermont 1–6 Paris Saint-Germain (9 April 2022)
- Highest scoring: Lorient 6–2 Saint-Étienne (8 April 2022); Nantes 5–3 Bordeaux (24 April 2022)
- Longest winning run: Monaco (9 matches)
- Longest unbeaten run: Paris Saint-Germain (15 matches)
- Longest winless run: Lorient (15 matches)
- Longest losing run: Angers; Lorient; Saint-Étienne (7 matches)

The 2021–22 Ligue 1 season, also known as Ligue 1 Uber Eats for sponsorship reasons, was a French association football tournament within Ligue 1. It was the 84th season since its establishment. It began on 6 August 2021 and concluded on 21 May 2022. The league fixtures were announced on 25 June 2021. Lille were the defending champions.

On 23 April, Paris Saint-Germain won a record-equalling tenth title with four matches to spare following a 1–1 draw against Lens.

== Teams ==
A total of twenty teams participated in the 2021–22 edition of the Ligue 1.

=== Changes ===
Troyes (promoted after a three-year absence) and Clermont (promoted to Ligue 1 for the first time in their history) were promoted from the 2020–21 Ligue 2. Dijon (relegated after five years in the top flight) and Nîmes (relegated after three years in the top flight) were relegated to 2021–22 Ligue 2.

Promoted to 2021–22 Ligue 1	Relegated from 2020–21 Ligue 1
Troyes; Clermont	Dijon FCO; Nîmes Olympique

=== Stadiums and locations ===
Location of teams in 2021–22 Ligue 1

Club	Location	Venue	Capacity	2020–21 season
Angers	Angers	Stade Raymond Kopa	18,752	13th
Bordeaux	Bordeaux	Matmut Atlantique	42,115	12th
Brest	Brest	Stade Francis-Le Blé	15,931	17th
Clermont	Clermont-Ferrand	Stade Gabriel Montpied	11,980	Ligue 2, 2nd
Lens	Lens	Stade Bollaert-Delelis	37,705	7th
Lille	Villeneuve-d'Ascq	Stade Pierre-Mauroy	50,186	1st
Lorient	Lorient	Stade du Moustoir	18,890	16th
Lyon	Décines-Charpieu	Groupama Stadium	59,186	4th
Marseille	Marseille	Orange Vélodrome	67,394	5th
Metz	Longeville-lès-Metz	Stade Saint-Symphorien	25,636	10th
Monaco	Monaco	Stade Louis II	18,523	3rd
Montpellier	Montpellier	Stade de la Mosson	32,900	8th
Nantes	Nantes	Stade de la Beaujoire	35,322	18th
Nice	Nice	Allianz Riviera	35,624	9th
Paris Saint-Germain	Paris	Parc des Princes	48,583	2nd
Reims	Reims	Stade Auguste Delaune	21,029	14th
Rennes	Rennes	Roazhon Park	29,778	6th
Saint-Étienne	Saint-Étienne	Stade Geoffroy-Guichard	41,965	11th
Strasbourg	Strasbourg	Stade de la Meinau	29,230	15th
Troyes	Troyes	Stade de l'Aube	20,400	Ligue 2, 1st

=== Personnel and kits ===
Team	Manager	Captain	Kit manufacturer	Shirt sponsor (front)	Shirt sponsor (back)	Shirt sponsor (sleeve)	Shorts sponsor	Socks sponsor
Angers	(France) Gérald Baticle	(Ivory Coast) Ismaël Traoré	Kappa	Groupe Actual (H), Le Gaulois (A & 3), L'Atoll Angers, Angers	Open Energie	P2I	Système U	None
Bordeaux	(France) David Guion	(France) Benoît Costil	Adidas	Fonds de dotation Cœur Marine et Blanc, Crédit Mutuel du Sud-Ouest	Bistro Régent	Cupra	None	None
Brest	(Armenia) Michel Der Zakarian	(Benin) Steve Mounié	Adidas	Quéguiner Matériaux (H), Yaourt Malo (A & 3), SILL (H), Breizh Cola (A & 3), GUYOT Environnement, Oceania Hotels	Écomiam, Groupe Océanic	None	E.Leclerc, E.Leclerc Drive	BSP Securité
Clermont	(France) Pascal Gastien	(France) Florent Ogier	Patrick	Crédit Mutuel, Clermont Ferrand, Puy-de-Dôme, Auvergne-Rhône-Alpes (H)	Systèmes Solaires, Groupe Batipro	Radio SCOOP	Veolia	None
Lens	(France) Franck Haise	(France) Yannick Cahuzac	Puma	Auchan, Groupe Lempereur, Smart Good Things	Assifep, Winamax	Aushopping Noyelles	Pas-de-Calais, McDonald's	None
Lille	(France) Jocelyn Gourvennec	(Portugal) José Fonte	New Balance	Boulanger, RIKA, Métropole Européenne de Lille (H), Hello Lille (A & 3)	Carrosserie Essalmi	Sibel Energie	Winamax	None
Lorient	(France) Christophe Pélissier	(France) Fabien Lemoine	Kappa	Jean Floc'h, Breizh Cola	KarrGreen, Olmix Group	Groupe Actual, Lorient Agglomération	Virage Conseil, B&B Hotels	None
Lyon	(Netherlands) Peter Bosz	(France) Léo Dubois	Adidas	Emirates	OOGarden, Groupe ALILA	MG Motor	Teddy Smith	None
Marseille	(Argentina) Jorge Sampaoli	(France) Steve Mandanda	Puma	Uber Eats, Parions Sport	Boulanger	None	Hotels.com	None
Metz	(France) Frédéric Antonetti	(Tunisia) Dylan Bronn	Kappa	Car Avenue (H), MOSL, Malezieux, Axia Interim	technoit, Nacon Gaming (H), Forcepower (A & 3)	Eurométropole de Metz	E.Leclerc, LCR	None
Monaco	(Belgium) Philippe Clement	(France) Wissam Ben Yedder	Kappa	eToro, Fedcom (UEFA matches only), Triangle Intérim	Fedcom, Alain Afflelou	None	VBET	None
Montpellier	(France) Olivier Dall'Oglio	(France) Téji Savanier	Nike	Partouche, FAUN-Environnement, Montpellier Métropole, Smart Good Things	NG Promotion, Sud de France	NG Promotion	Système U, Groupe Ilios, UP2IT	None
Nantes	(New Caledonia) Antoine Kombouaré	(France) Alban Lafont	Macron	Synergie, Groupe AFD, Proginov	Préservation du Patrimoine, Millet	LNA Santé	Univers City Immo, Flamino	None
Nice	(France) Christophe Galtier	(Brazil) Dante	Macron	Ineos	Ineos Grenadier	Ineos Hygienics	Ville de Nice	None
Paris Saint-Germain	(Argentina) Mauricio Pochettino	(Brazil) Marquinhos	Air Jordan, Nike (away)	ALL - Accor Live Limitless	Ooredoo	QNB Group	None	None
Reims	(Spain) Óscar García	(Morocco) Yunis Abdelhamid	Umbro	Maisons France Confort (H), Hexaom (A & 3), Transports Caillot, Crédit Agricole	SOS Malus	Triangle Intérim, Grand Reims (H), Reims (A & 3)	Winamax	None
Rennes	(France) Bruno Génésio	(Mali) Hamari Traoré	Puma	Samsic, Del Arte, Groupe Launay, Association ELA	PokerStars Sports, Blot Immobilier	Ici Rennes	Convivio	None
Saint-Étienne	(France) Pascal Dupraz	(Tunisia) Wahbi Khazri	Le Coq Sportif	ZEbet, Loire, Groupe BYmyCAR, Groupe Atrium	ASSE Cœur-Vert, Alain Afflelou	Smart Good Things	Aésio Mutuelle, Desjoyaux Piscines	None
Strasbourg	(France) Julien Stéphan	(France) Dimitri Liénard	Adidas	ÉS Énergies (H), Winamax (A & 3), Hager, Pierre Schmidt (H), Stoeffler (A & 3)	Winamax (H), ÉS Énergies (A & 3), Boulanger	Würth	Eurométropole de Strasbourg, LCR, Atheo	None
Troyes	(France) Bruno Irles	Vacant	Le Coq Sportif	Babeau Seguin, Lex Persona, norelem, Festilight	Sinfin, Premium Automobiles	Desimo	Troyes, LCR	None

=== Managerial changes ===
Team	Outgoing manager	Manner of departure	Date of vacancy	Position in table	Incoming manager	Date of appointment
Angers	(France) Stéphane Moulin	Resigned	24 May 2021	Pre-season	(France) Gérald Baticle	27 May 2021
Lyon	(France) Rudi Garcia	Resigned	24 May 2021	Pre-season	(Netherlands) Peter Bosz	29 May 2021
Nice	(Romania) Adrian Ursea	Mutual consent	24 May 2021	Pre-season	(France) Christophe Galtier	30 June 2021
Lille	(France) Christophe Galtier	Resigned	25 May 2021	Pre-season	(France) Jocelyn Gourvennec	5 July 2021
Reims	(France) David Guion	Resigned	30 June 2021	Pre-season	(Spain) Óscar García	1 July 2021
Montpellier	(Armenia) Michel Der Zakarian	Mutual consent	30 June 2021	Pre-season	(France) Olivier Dall'Oglio	1 July 2021
Strasbourg	(France) Thierry Laurey	End of contract	30 June 2021	Pre-season	(France) Julien Stéphan	1 July 2021
Brest	(France) Olivier Dall'Oglio	Signed for Montpellier	30 June 2021	Pre-season	(Armenia) Michel Der Zakarian	1 July 2021
Bordeaux	(France) Jean-Louis Gasset	Sacked	27 July 2021	Pre-season	(Bosnia and Herzegovina) Vladimir Petković	27 July 2021
Saint-Étienne	(France) Claude Puel	Sacked	5 December 2021	20th	(France) Pascal Dupraz	14 December 2021
Troyes	(France) Laurent Batlles	Resigned	30 December 2021	15th	(France) Bruno Irles	3 January 2022
Monaco	(Croatia) Niko Kovač	Sacked	1 January 2022	6th	(Belgium) Philippe Clement	3 January 2022
Bordeaux	(Bosnia and Herzegovina) Vladimir Petković	Sacked	12 February 2022	19th	(France) David Guion	17 February 2022

== League table ==
Pos	Team	Pld	W	D	L	GF	GA	GD	Pts	Qualification or relegation
1	Paris Saint-Germain (C)	38	26	8	4	90	36	+54	86	Qualification for the Champions League group stage
2	Marseille	38	21	8	9	63	38	+25	71	Qualification for the Champions League group stage
3	Monaco	38	20	9	9	65	40	+25	69	Qualification for the Champions League third qualifying round
4	Rennes	38	20	6	12	82	40	+42	66	Qualification for the Europa League group stage
5	Nice	38	20	7	11	52	36	+16	66 (Note: Nice were deducted one point for uncontrolled crowd trouble that caused the abandonment of their match against Marseille.)	Qualification for the Europa Conference League play-off round
6	Strasbourg	38	17	12	9	60	43	+17	63	
7	Lens	38	17	11	10	62	48	+14	62	
8	Lyon	38	17	11	10	66	51	+15	61 (Note: Lyon were deducted one point for uncontrolled crowd trouble that caused the abandonment of their match against Marseille.)	
9	Nantes	38	15	10	13	55	48	+7	55	Qualification for the Europa League group stage (Note: Nantes qualified for the Europa League group stage as the 2021–22 Coupe de France winners.)
10	Lille	38	14	13	11	48	48	0	55	
11	Brest	38	13	9	16	49	57	−8	48	
12	Reims	38	11	13	14	43	44	−1	46	
13	Montpellier	38	12	7	19	49	61	−12	43	
14	Angers	38	10	11	17	44	55	−11	41	
15	Troyes	38	9	11	18	37	53	−16	38	
16	Lorient	38	8	12	18	35	63	−28	36	
17	Clermont	38	9	9	20	38	69	−31	36	
18	Saint-Étienne (R)	38	7	11	20	42	77	−35	32	Qualification for the relegation play-offs
19	Metz (R)	38	6	13	19	35	69	−34	31	Relegation to Ligue 2 (Note: Bordeaux were initially relegated to Ligue 2. However, on 14 June it was decided by the DNCG to relegate Bordeaux administratively to the Championnat National for financial issues. On 27 July 2022, Bordeaux won its appeal and was officially maintained in Ligue 2 for the 2022–23 season.)
20	Bordeaux (R)	38	6	13	19	52	91	−39	31	Relegation to Ligue 2

Source: Ligue 1
Rules for classification: 1) Points; 2) Goal difference; 3) Head-to-head points; 4) Head-to-head goal difference; 5) Head-to-head goals scored; 6) Head-to-head away goals scored; 7) Goals scored; 8) Away goals scored; 9) Fair-play points (Note: Head-to-head record is used only after all the matches between the teams in question have been played).
(C) Champions; (R) Relegated

== Results ==
Home \ Away	ANG	BOR	BRE	CLE	LEN	LIL	LOR	OL	OM	MET	ASM	MON	FCN	NIC	PSG	REI	REN	STE	STR	TRO
Angers	—	4–1	1–0	0–1	1–2	1–1	1–0	3–0	0–0	3–2	1–3	2–0	1–4	1–2	0–3	0–1	2–0	0–1	0–1	2–1
Bordeaux	1–1	—	1–2	0–2	2–3	2–3	0–0	2–2	0–1	3–1	1–1	0–2	1–1	0–1	2–3	3–2	1–1	2–2	4–3	0–2
Brest	1–1	2–4	—	2–0	4–0	2–0	0–1	2–1	1–4	1–2	2–0	0–4	1–1	0–3	2–4	1–1	1–1	1–0	0–1	5–1
Clermont	2–2	1–1	1–1	—	2–2	1–0	0–2	1–2	0–1	2–2	1–3	2–1	2–3	1–2	1–6	0–0	2–1	1–2	0–2	2–0
Lens	2–2	3–2	0–1	3–1	—	1–0	2–2	1–1	0–2	4–1	2–2	2–0	2–2	3–0	1–1	2–0	1–0	2–2	0–1	4–0
Lille	1–1	0–0	1–1	4–0	1–2	—	3–1	0–0	2–0	0–0	1–2	2–1	1–1	0–4	1–5	2–1	2–2	0–0	1–0	2–1
Lorient	0–0	1–1	1–2	1–1	2–0	2–1	—	1–4	0–3	1–0	1–0	0–1	0–1	1–0	1–1	1–2	0–2	6–2	0–0	1–1
Lyon	3–2	6–1	1–1	3–3	2–1	0–1	1–1	—	2–1	1–1	2–0	5–2	3–2	2–0	1–1	1–2	2–4	1–0	3–1	3–1
Marseille	5–2	2–2	1–2	0–2	2–3	1–1	4–1	0–3	—	0–0	0–1	2–0	3–2	2–1	0–0	1–1	2–0	3–1	4–0	1–0
Metz	1–0	3–3	0–1	1–1	0–0	3–3	4–1	3–2	1–2	—	1–2	1–3	0–0	0–2	1–2	1–1	0–3	1–1	0–2	0–2
Monaco	2–0	3–0	4–2	4–0	0–2	2–2	0–0	2–0	0–2	4–0	—	3–1	1–1	1–0	3–0	1–2	2–1	3–1	1–1	2–1
Montpellier	4–1	3–3	1–2	1–0	1–0	0–1	3–1	0–1	2–3	2–2	3–2	—	2–0	0–0	0–4	0–0	2–4	2–0	1–1	0–1
Nantes	1–1	5–3	3–1	2–1	3–2	0–1	4–2	0–1	0–1	2–0	0–0	2–0	—	0–2	3–1	1–0	2–1	1–1	2–2	2–0
Nice	1–0	4–0	2–1	0–1	2–1	1–3	2–1	3–2	1–1	0–1	2–2	0–1	2–1	—	1–0	0–0	1–1	4–2	0–3	1–0
Paris SG	2–1	3–0	2–0	4–0	1–1	2–1	5–1	2–1	2–1	5–0	2–0	2–0	3–1	0–0	—	4–0	1–0	3–1	4–2	2–2
Reims	1–2	5–0	1–1	1–0	1–2	2–1	0–0	0–0	0–1	0–1	0–0	3–3	3–1	2–3	0–2	—	2–3	2–0	1–1	1–2
Rennes	2–0	6–0	2–0	6–0	1–1	1–2	5–0	4–1	2–0	6–1	2–3	2–0	1–0	1–2	2–0	0–2	—	2–0	1–0	4–1
Saint-Étienne	2–2	1–2	2–1	3–2	1–2	1–1	1–1	1–1	2–4	1–0	1–4	3–1	0–1	0–3	1–3	1–2	0–5	—	2–2	1–1
Strasbourg	0–2	5–2	3–1	1–0	1–0	1–2	4–0	1–1	0–2	3–0	1–0	3–1	1–0	0–0	3–3	1–1	2–1	5–1	—	1–1
Troyes	1–1	1–2	1–1	0–1	1–3	3–0	2–0	0–1	1–1	0–0	1–2	1–1	1–0	1–0	1–2	1–0	2–2	0–1	1–1	—

Source: Ligue 1
Legend: Blue = home team win; Yellow = draw; Red = away team win.
For upcoming matches, an "a" indicates there is an article about the rivalry between the two participants.

== Relegation play-offs ==
The 2021–22 season ended with a relegation play-off between the 18th-placed Ligue 1 team, Saint-Étienne, and the winner of the semi-final of the Ligue 2 play-off, Auxerre, on a two-legged confrontation.

1st leg

26 May 2022
19:00 CEST

Auxerre	1–1	Saint-Étienne
Perrin 87'	Report	Youssouf 15'

Stade de l'Abbé-Deschamps, Auxerre
Attendance: 17,479
Referee: Benoît Millot

2nd leg

29 May 2022
19:00 CEST

Saint-Étienne	1–1 (a.e.t.)	Auxerre
Camara 76'	Report	Sakhi 51'
Penalties
Boudebouz (penalty missed); Nordin (penalty scored); Trauco (penalty scored); Dioussé (penalty scored); Bouanga (penalty scored)	4–5	(penalty scored) Dugimont; (penalty scored) Jubal; (penalty scored) Perrin; (penalty scored) Charbonnier; (penalty scored) Touré

Stade Geoffroy-Guichard, Saint-Étienne
Attendance: 24,489
Referee: Antony Gautier

2–2 on aggregate. Auxerre won 5–4 on penalties and were promoted to 2022–23 Ligue 1; Saint-Étienne were relegated to 2022–23 Ligue 2.

== Season statistics ==
=== Top goalscorers ===
Rank	Player	Club	Goals
1	(France) Kylian Mbappé	Paris Saint-Germain	28
2	(France) Wissam Ben Yedder	Monaco	25
3	(France) Moussa Dembélé	Lyon	21
3	(France) Martin Terrier	Rennes	21
5	(Algeria) Andy Delort	Montpellier/Nice (Note: Played for Montpellier until matchday 3, scoring 2 goals)	18
6	(Canada) Jonathan David	Lille	15
6	(France) Gaëtan Laborde	Montpellier/Rennes (Note: Played for Montpellier until matchday 4, scoring 3 goals)	15
8	(Guinea) Mohamed Bayo	Clermont	14
9	(Brazil) Neymar	Paris Saint-Germain	13
10	(France) Ludovic Ajorque	Strasbourg	12
10	(France) Arnaud Kalimuendo	Lens	12
10	(France) Randal Kolo Muani	Nantes	12
10	(France) Dimitri Payet	Marseille	12
10	(Cameroon) Karl Toko Ekambi	Lyon	12

=== Clean sheets ===
Rank	Player	Club	Clean sheets
1	(Argentina) Walter Benítez	Nice	14
2	(Belgium) Matz Sels	Strasbourg	13
3	(Germany) Alexander Nübel	Monaco	11
3	(Serbia) Predrag Rajković	Reims	11
5	(Senegal) Alfred Gomis	Rennes	10
5	(Spain) Pau López	Marseille	10
7	(France) Gauthier Gallon	Troyes	8
7	(Brazil) Léo Jardim	Lille	8
7	(France) Alban Lafont	Nantes	8
7	(Portugal) Anthony Lopes	Lyon	8
7	(Switzerland) Jonas Omlin	Montpellier	8

=== Hat-tricks ===
Player	Club	Against	Result	Date
(France) Martin Terrier	Rennes	Saint-Étienne	5–0 (A)	5 December 2021
(South Korea) Hwang Ui-jo	Bordeaux	Strasbourg	4–3 (H)	23 January 2022
(Poland) Arkadiusz Milik	Marseille	Angers	5–2 (H)	4 February 2022
(Guinea) Serhou Guirassy	Rennes	Metz	6–1 (H)	20 March 2022
(France) Kylian Mbappé	Paris Saint-Germain	Clermont	6–1 (A)	9 April 2022
(Brazil) Neymar	Paris Saint-Germain	Clermont	6–1 (A)	9 April 2022
(France) Wissam Ben Yedder	Monaco	Brest	4–2 (H)	14 May 2022
(France) Kylian Mbappé	Paris Saint-Germain	Metz	5–0 (H)	21 May 2022
(Algeria) Andy Delort	Nice	Reims	3–2 (A)	21 May 2022

=== Discipline ===
==== Player ====
- Most yellow cards: 12
  - (Italy) Marco Verratti (Paris Saint-Germain)
- Most red cards: 3
  - (Brazil) Dante (Nice)

==== Team ====
- Most yellow cards: 93
  - Lille
- Most red cards: 9
  - Metz
  - Montpellier
- Fewest yellow cards: 54
  - Rennes
- Fewest red cards: 2
  - Brest
  - Rennes

== Awards ==
=== Monthly ===
Month	Player of the Month		Ref.
Month	Player	Club	Ref.
August	(France) Kylian Mbappé	Paris Saint-Germain	
September	(Ivory Coast) Seko Fofana	Lens	
October	(Brazil) Lucas Paquetá	Lyon	
November	(France) Gaëtan Laborde	Rennes	
December	(France) Téji Savanier	Montpellier	
January	(France) Wissam Ben Yedder	Monaco	
February	(France) Kylian Mbappé	Paris Saint-Germain	
March	(France) Martin Terrier	Rennes	
April	(France) Benjamin Bourigeaud	Rennes	

=== Annual ===
Award	Winner	Club	Ref.
Player of the Season	(France) Kylian Mbappé	Paris Saint-Germain	
Young Player of the Season	(France) William Saliba	Marseille	
Foreign Player of the Season	(Brazil) Lucas Paquetá	Lyon	
Goalkeeper of the Season	(Italy) Gianluigi Donnarumma	Paris Saint-Germain	
Goal of the Season	(Senegal) Bamba Dieng	Marseille	
Manager of the Season	(France) Bruno Génésio	Rennes	

Team of the Year
Goalkeeper	(Italy) Gianluigi Donnarumma (Paris Saint-Germain)			
Defenders	(France) Jonathan Clauss (Lens)	(Brazil) Marquinhos (Paris Saint-Germain)	(France) William Saliba (Marseille)	(Portugal) Nuno Mendes (Paris Saint-Germain)
Midfielders	(France) Dimitri Payet (Marseille)	(France) Aurélien Tchouaméni (Monaco)	(Ivory Coast) Seko Fofana (Lens)	(France) Martin Terrier (Rennes)
Forwards	(France) Wissam Ben Yedder (Monaco)		(France) Kylian Mbappé (Paris Saint-Germain)	
