= 2018–19 Ligue 1 =

81st season of top-tier French football

Ligue 1
- Season: 2018–19
- Dates: 10 August 2018 – 24 May 2019
- Champions: Paris Saint-Germain; 8th Ligue 1 title 8th French title
- Relegated: Caen; Guingamp
- Champions League: Paris Saint-Germain; Lille; Lyon
- Europa League: Saint-Étienne; Rennes; Strasbourg
- Matches: 380
- Goals: 972 (2.56 per match)
- Top goalscorer: Kylian Mbappé (33 goals)
- Biggest home win: Paris Saint-Germain 9–0 Guingamp (19 January 2019)
- Biggest away win: Caen 0–5 Saint-Étienne (16 March 2019)
- Highest scoring: Paris Saint-Germain 9–0 Guingamp (19 January 2019)
- Longest winning run: 14 matches Paris Saint-Germain
- Longest unbeaten run: 20 matches Paris Saint-Germain
- Longest winless run: 12 matches Monaco
- Longest losing run: 6 matches Guingamp
- Highest attendance: 64,696; Marseille 0–2 Paris Saint-Germain (28 October 2018)
- Lowest attendance: 5,502; Monaco 0–1 Angers (25 September 2018)
- Total attendance: 8,676,490
- Average attendance: 22,833

The 2018–19 Ligue 1 season, also known as Ligue 1 Conforama for sponsorship reasons, was the 81st season since its establishment. The season began on 10 August 2018 and concluded on 24 May 2019. Paris Saint-Germain were the defending champions.

On 21 April, Paris Saint-Germain won their second consecutive Ligue 1 title and eighth title overall following Lille's 0–0 draw against Toulouse.

== Teams ==
Twenty teams competed in the league, with two promoted teams from Ligue 2, Reims and Nîmes, replacing the two relegated teams from the 2017–18 Ligue 1 season, Troyes and Metz.

=== Stadia and locations ===
Location of teams in 2018–19 Ligue 1

Club	Location	Venue	Capacity	2017–18 season
Amiens	Amiens	Stade de la Licorne	12,097	13th
Angers	Angers	Stade Raymond Kopa	17,835	14th
Bordeaux	Bordeaux	Matmut Atlantique	42,115	6th
Caen	Caen	Stade Michel d'Ornano	20,453	16th
Dijon	Dijon	Stade Gaston Gérard	18,376	11th
Guingamp	Guingamp	Stade du Roudourou	18,378	12th
Lille	Villeneuve-d'Ascq	Stade Pierre-Mauroy	50,157	17th
Lyon	Décines-Charpieu	Groupama Stadium	59,186	3rd
Marseille	Marseille	Orange Vélodrome	67,394	4th
Monaco	Monaco	Stade Louis II	18,523	2nd
Montpellier	Montpellier	Stade de la Mosson	32,939	10th
Nantes	Nantes	Stade de la Beaujoire	37,473	9th
Nice	Nice	Allianz Riviera	35,624	8th
Nîmes	Nîmes	Stade des Costières	18,482	Ligue 2, 2nd
Paris Saint-Germain	Paris	Parc des Princes	48,583	1st
Reims	Reims	Stade Auguste Delaune	21,684	Ligue 2, 1st
Rennes	Rennes	Roazhon Park	29,778	5th
Saint-Étienne	Saint-Étienne	Stade Geoffroy-Guichard	41,965	7th
Strasbourg	Strasbourg	Stade de la Meinau	29,230	15th
Toulouse	Toulouse	Stadium Municipal	33,150	18th

=== Personnel and kits ===
Team	Manager	Captain	Kit manufacturer	Shirt sponsors (front)	Shirt sponsors (back)	Shirt sponsors (sleeve)	Shorts sponsors	Socks sponsors
Amiens	(France) Christophe Pélissier	(France) Thomas Monconduit	(Germany) Puma	Intersport, CG2I, Teddy Smith	IGOL Lubrifiants	None	Winamax	None
Angers	(France) Stéphane Moulin	(Ivory Coast) Ismaël Traoré	(Italy) Kappa	Scania (H)/Le Gaulois (A), L'Atoll Angers, Brioche Pasquier, Angers	SOS Malus	None	Système U	None
Bordeaux	(Portugal) Paulo Sousa	(France) Benoît Costil	(Germany) Puma	Groupe Sweetcom (H)/Bistro Régent (A)/Winamax (T), Intersport	Bistro Régent (H)/Groupe Sweetcom (A & T)	Wiśniowski	Winamax	None
Caen	(France) Fabien Mercadal	(Republic of the Congo) Prince Oniangué	(England) Umbro	Isigny Sainte-Mère (H)/Intersport (A & 3), Biostime (H), Künkel, Thalazur	Maisons Caen Construction (H)/Biostime (A)	Alticap	McDonald's, Teddy Smith	None
Dijon	(New Caledonia) Antoine Kombouaré	(Cape Verde) Júlio Tavares	(Italy) Lotto	Groupe Roger Martin (H)/Suez (A & T), DVF Group, Dijon (H)/Groupe Roger Martin (A)	DORAS	Leader Interim, Auteur des Williams, Coup d'Pouce	Société de Travaux du Centre Est, Dalkia	Caisse d'Épargne
Guingamp	(France) Jocelyn Gourvennec	(France) Christophe Kerbrat	(Belgium) Patrick	Servagroupe, Armor-Lux, Breizh Cola	Rapidoprêt	Union d'Experts	Cre'actuel	None
Lille	(France) Christophe Galtier	(France) Adama Soumaoro	(United States) New Balance	Comarch, DMAX Lille	Flunch	Boulanger	Winamax	None
Lyon	(France) Bruno Génésio	(France) Nabil Fekir	(Germany) Adidas	Hyundai/Veolia (in UEFA matches), Groupama, MDA Electroménager (H)/Pulsat (A)	Groupe ALILA	Adéquat Intérim	None	None
Marseille	(France) Rudi Garcia	(France) Dimitri Payet	(Germany) Puma	Orange	Boulanger	None	None	None
Monaco	(Portugal) Leonardo Jardim	(Colombia) Radamel Falcao	(United States) Nike	Fedcom	None	Triangle Intérim	Orezza	None
Montpellier	(Armenia) Michel Der Zakarian	(Brazil) Vitorino Hilton	(United States) Nike	Mutuelles du Soleil, FAUN-Environnement, Montpellier Métropole, Groupama	Sud de France	NG Promotion	Système U, Groupe Ilios	None
Nantes	(Bosnia and Herzegovina) Vahid Halilhodžić	(France) Valentin Rongier	(United States) New Balance	Synergie, Manitou, Proginov	France Confort Habitat	LNA Santé	Maisons Pierre, Flamino	None
Nice	(France) Patrick Vieira	(Brazil) Dante Bonfim	(Italy) Macron	Fonds de Dotation OGC Nice, Ville de Nice, Métropole Nice Côte d'Azur	Mutuelles du Soleil	Services Pro Express	Winamax	None
Nîmes	(France) Bernard Blaquart	(Algeria) Féthi Harek	(Germany) Puma	Hectare Amenageur Lotisseur, Nîmes	Nîmes Métropole	La Région Occitanie	RMC Sport	None
Paris Saint-Germain	(Germany) Thomas Tuchel	(Brazil) Thiago Silva	(United States) Nike/Air Jordan (in UEFA matches)	Fly Emirates	Ooredoo	QNB	None	None
Reims	(France) David Guion	(France) Marvin Martin	(France) Hungaria Sport	Système U Reims Village, Transports Caillot	Euro Deal Agence d'emploi, AMP Groupe (H)	Triangle Intérim, Grand Reims (H), Reims (A & 3)	Crédit Agricole Nord-Est	None
Rennes	(France) Julien Stephan	(France) Benjamin André	(Germany) Puma	Samsic, Del Arte, Groupe Launay, Association ELA	Blot Immobilier	rennes.fr	Convivio	None
Saint-Étienne	(France) Jean-Louis Gasset	(France) Loïc Perrin	(France) Le Coq Sportif	AÉSIO, Loire	Groupe Sweetcom	MARKAL	Desjoyaux Piscines	None
Strasbourg	(France) Thierry Laurey	(Serbia) Stefan Mitrović	(Germany) Adidas	ÉS Énergies (H)/CroisiEurope (A)/Hager (in cup matches), Hager, Pierre Schmidt (H)/Stoeffler (A)	CroisiEurope (H)/ÉS Énergies (A)	Würth	Severin France, Eurométropole de Strasbourg	None
Toulouse	(France) Alain Casanova	(Ivory Coast) Max-Alain Gradel	(Spain) Joma	Triangle Intérim, LP Promotion	Newrest	Prévoir Assurances	Mairie de Toulouse, Conseil départemental de la Haute-Garonne	None

=== Managerial changes ===
Team	Outgoing manager	Manner of departure	Date of vacancy	Position in table	Incoming manager	Date of appointment
Paris Saint-Germain	(Spain) Unai Emery	End of contract	19 May 2018	Pre-season	(Germany) Thomas Tuchel	1 June 2018
Nantes	(Italy) Claudio Ranieri	Mutual consent	19 May 2018	Pre-season	(Portugal) Miguel Cardoso	13 June 2018
Nice	(Switzerland) Lucien Favre	Mutual consent	19 May 2018	Pre-season	(France) Patrick Vieira	11 June 2018
Caen	(France) Patrice Garande	End of contract	19 May 2018	Pre-season	(France) Fabien Mercadal	8 June 2018
Toulouse	(France) Mickaël Debève	Signed by Lens as assistant	14 June 2018	Pre-season	(France) Alain Casanova	22 June 2018
Bordeaux	(Uruguay) Gus Poyet	Sacked	17 August 2018	19th	(Brazil) Ricardo Gomes	5 September 2018
Nantes	(Portugal) Miguel Cardoso	Sacked	1 October 2018	19th	(Bosnia and Herzegovina) Vahid Halilhodžić	1 October 2018
Monaco	(Portugal) Leonardo Jardim	Sacked	11 October 2018	18th	(France) Thierry Henry	13 October 2018
Guingamp	(New Caledonia) Antoine Kombouaré	Sacked	6 November 2018	20th	(France) Jocelyn Gourvennec	8 November 2018
Rennes	(France) Sabri Lamouchi	Sacked	3 December 2018	14th	(France) Julien Stephan	3 December 2018
Dijon	(France) Olivier Dall'Oglio	Sacked	31 December 2018	18th	(New Caledonia) Antoine Kombouaré	10 January 2019
Monaco	(France) Thierry Henry	Sacked	24 January 2019	19th	(Portugal) Leonardo Jardim	25 January 2019
Bordeaux	(Brazil) Ricardo Gomes	Sacked	26 February 2019	13th	(Portugal) Paulo Sousa	8 March 2019

== League table ==
Pos	Team	Pld	W	D	L	GF	GA	GD	Pts	Qualification or relegation
1	Paris Saint-Germain (C)	38	29	4	5	105	35	+70	91	Qualification to Champions League group stage
2	Lille	38	22	9	7	68	33	+35	75	Qualification to Champions League group stage
3	Lyon	38	21	9	8	70	47	+23	72	Qualification to Champions League group stage
4	Saint-Étienne	38	19	9	10	59	41	+18	66	Qualification to Europa League group stage
5	Marseille	38	18	7	13	60	52	+8	61	
6	Montpellier	38	15	14	9	53	42	+11	59	
7	Nice	38	15	11	12	30	35	−5	56	
8	Reims	38	13	16	9	39	42	−3	55	
9	Nîmes	38	15	8	15	57	58	−1	53	
10	Rennes	38	13	13	12	55	52	+3	52	Qualification to Europa League group stage (Note: Rennes qualified for the Europa League group stage by winning the 2018–19 Coupe de France.)
11	Strasbourg	38	11	16	11	58	48	+10	49	Qualification to Europa League second qualifying round (Note: Strasbourg qualified for the Europa League second qualifying round by winning the 2018–19 Coupe de la Ligue.)
12	Nantes	38	13	9	16	48	48	0	48	
13	Angers	38	10	16	12	44	49	−5	46	
14	Bordeaux	38	10	11	17	34	42	−8	41	
15	Amiens	38	9	11	18	31	52	−21	38	
16	Toulouse	38	8	14	16	35	57	−22	38	
17	Monaco	38	8	12	18	38	57	−19	36	
18	Dijon (O)	38	9	7	22	31	60	−29	34	Qualification to Relegation play-offs
19	Caen (R)	38	7	12	19	29	54	−25	33	Relegation to Ligue 2
20	Guingamp (R)	38	5	12	21	28	68	−40	27	Relegation to Ligue 2

Source: Ligue 1 and Soccerway
Rules for classification: 1) Points; 2) Goal difference; 3) Head-to-head points; 4) Head-to-head goal difference; 5) Head-to-head goals scored; 6) Head-to-head away goals scored; 7) Goals scored; 8) Away goals scored; 9) Most goals scored in single league match; 10) Fairplay ranking.
(C) Champions; (O) Play-off winners; (R) Relegated

== Results ==
Home \ Away	AMI	ANG	BOR	CAE	DIJ	GUI	LIL	OL	OM	ASM	MON	FCN	NIC	NMS	PSG	REI	REN	STE	STR	TFC
Amiens	—	0–0	0–0	1–0	1–0	2–1	2–3	0–1	1–3	0–2	1–2	1–2	1–0	2–1	0–3	4–1	2–1	2–2	0–0	0–0
Angers	0–0	—	1–2	1–1	1–0	0–1	1–0	1–2	1–1	2–2	1–0	1–0	3–0	3–4	1–2	1–1	3–3	1–1	2–2	0–0
Bordeaux	1–1	0–1	—	0–0	1–0	0–0	1–0	2–3	2–0	2–1	1–2	3–0	0–1	3–3	2–2	0–1	1–1	3–2	0–2	2–1
Caen	1–0	0–1	0–1	—	1–0	0–0	1–3	2–2	0–1	0–1	2–2	0–1	1–1	1–2	1–2	3–2	1–2	0–5	0–0	2–1
Dijon	0–0	1–3	0–0	0–2	—	2–1	1–2	0–3	1–2	2–0	1–1	2–0	0–1	0–4	0–4	1–1	3–2	0–1	2–1	2–1
Guingamp	1–2	1–0	1–3	0–0	1–0	—	0–2	2–4	1–3	1–1	1–1	0–0	0–0	2–2	1–3	0–1	2–1	0–1	1–1	1–2
Lille	2–1	5–0	1–0	1–0	1–0	3–0	—	2–2	3–0	0–1	0–0	2–1	4–0	5–0	5–1	1–1	3–1	3–1	0–0	1–2
Lyon	2–0	2–1	1–1	4–0	1–3	2–1	2–2	—	4–2	3–0	3–2	1–1	0–1	2–0	2–1	1–1	0–2	1–0	2–0	5–1
Marseille	2–0	2–2	1–0	2–0	2–0	4–0	1–2	0–3	—	1–1	1–0	1–2	1–0	2–1	0–2	0–0	2–2	2–0	3–2	4–0
Monaco	2–0	0–1	1–1	0–1	2–2	0–2	0–0	2–0	2–3	—	1–2	1–0	1–1	1–1	0–4	0–0	1–2	2–3	1–5	2–1
Montpellier	1–1	2–2	2–0	2–0	1–2	2–0	0–1	1–1	3–0	2–2	—	1–1	1–0	3–0	3–2	2–4	2–2	0–0	1–1	2–1
Nantes	3–2	1–1	1–0	1–1	3–0	5–0	2–3	2–1	3–2	1–3	2–0	—	1–2	2–4	3–2	0–0	0–1	1–1	0–1	4–0
Nice	1–0	0–0	1–0	0–1	0–4	3–0	2–0	1–0	0–1	2–0	1–0	1–1	—	2–0	0–3	0–1	2–1	1–1	1–0	1–1
Nîmes	3–0	3–1	2–1	2–0	2–0	0–0	2–3	2–3	3–1	1–0	1–1	1–0	0–1	—	2–4	0–0	3–1	1–1	2–2	0–1
Paris SG	5–0	3–1	1–0	3–0	4–0	9–0	2–1	5–0	3–1	3–1	5–1	1–0	1–1	3–0	—	4–1	4–1	4–0	2–2	1–0
Reims	2–2	1–1	0–0	2–2	0–0	2–1	1–1	1–0	2–1	1–0	0–1	1–0	1–1	0–3	3–1	—	2–0	0–2	2–1	0–1
Rennes	1–0	1–0	2–0	3–1	2–0	1–1	3–1	0–1	1–1	2–2	0–0	1–1	0–0	4–0	1–3	0–2	—	3–0	1–4	1–1
Saint-Étienne	0–0	4–3	3–0	2–1	3–0	2–1	0–1	1–2	2–1	2–0	0–1	3–0	3–0	2–1	0–1	2–0	1–1	—	2–1	2–0
Strasbourg	3–1	1–2	1–0	2–2	3–0	3–3	1–1	2–2	1–1	2–1	1–3	2–3	2–0	0–1	1–1	4–0	0–2	1–1	—	1–1
Toulouse	0–1	0–0	2–1	1–1	2–2	1–0	0–0	2–2	2–5	1–1	0–3	1–0	1–1	1–0	0–1	1–1	2–2	2–3	1–2	—

Source: Ligue 1
Legend: Blue = home team win; Yellow = draw; Red = away team win.
For upcoming matches, an "a" indicates there is an article about the rivalry between the two participants.

== Relegation play-offs ==
The 2018–19 season ended with a relegation play-off between the 18th-placed Ligue 1 team, Dijon, and the winner of the semi-final of the Ligue 2 play-off, Lens, on a two-legged confrontation.

30 May 2019
20:45 CEST

Lens	1–1	Dijon
Bellegarde 49'	Report	Kwon Chang-hoon 81'

Stade Bollaert-Delelis, Lens
Attendance: 37,355
Referee: Amaury Delerue

2 June 2019
21:15 CEST

Dijon	3–1	Lens
Sliti 28', 90'; Saïd 70'	Report	Duverne 39'

Stade Gaston Gérard, Dijon
Attendance: 15,367
Referee: Ruddy Buquet

Dijon won 4–2 on aggregate and therefore both clubs remained in their respective leagues.

== Season statistics ==
=== Top goalscorers ===
Rank	Player	Club	Goals
1	(France) Kylian Mbappé	Paris Saint-Germain	33
2	(Ivory Coast) Nicolas Pépé	Lille	22
3	(Uruguay) Edinson Cavani	Paris Saint-Germain	18
4	(France) Florian Thauvin	Marseille	16
5	(France) Moussa Dembélé	Lyon	15
5	(Colombia) Radamel Falcao	Monaco	15
5	(Brazil) Neymar	Paris Saint-Germain	15
8	(Algeria) Andy Delort	Montpellier	14
9	(France) Jonathan Bamba	Lille	13
9	(Tunisia) Wahbi Khazri	Saint-Étienne	13

=== Hat-tricks ===
Player	Club	Against	Result	Date
(Ivory Coast) Nicolas Pépé	Lille	Amiens	3–2 (A)	15 September 2018
(France) Kylian Mbappé^{4}	Paris Saint-Germain	Lyon	5–0 (H)	7 October 2018
(Argentina) Emiliano Sala	Nantes	Toulouse	4–0 (H)	20 October 2018
(Uruguay) Edinson Cavani	Paris Saint-Germain	Monaco	4–0 (A)	11 November 2018
(France) Florian Thauvin	Marseille	Amiens	3–1 (A)	25 November 2018
(Uruguay) Edinson Cavani	Paris Saint-Germain	Guingamp	9–0 (H)	19 January 2019
(France) Kylian Mbappé	Paris Saint-Germain	Guingamp	9–0 (H)	19 January 2019
(France) Kylian Mbappé	Paris Saint-Germain	Monaco	3–1 (H)	21 April 2019
(Algeria) Youcef Atal	Nice	Guingamp	3–0 (H)	28 April 2019

Note

^{4} Player scored 4 goals

== Awards ==
Award	Winner	Club
Player of the Season	(France) Kylian Mbappé	Paris Saint-Germain
Young Player of the Season	(France) Kylian Mbappé	Paris Saint-Germain
Goalkeeper of the Season	(France) Mike Maignan	Lille
Goal of the Season	(France) Loïc Rémy	Lille
Manager of the Season	(France) Christophe Galtier	Lille

Team of the Year
Goalkeeper	(France) Mike Maignan (Lille)				
Defenders	(France) Kenny Lala (Strasbourg)	(Brazil) Marquinhos (Paris Saint-Germain)	(Brazil) Thiago Silva (Paris Saint-Germain)	(France) Ferland Mendy (Lyon)	
Midfielders	(Ivory Coast) Nicolas Pépé (Lille)	(Italy) Marco Verratti (Paris Saint-Germain)	(Argentina) Ángel Di María (Paris Saint-Germain)	(France) Tanguy Ndombele (Lyon)	(Brazil) Neymar (Paris Saint-Germain)
Forwards	(France) Kylian Mbappé (Paris Saint-Germain)				

== Attendances ==
#	Football club	Home games	Average attendance
1	Olympique de Marseille	19	50,361
2	Olympique Lyonnais	19	49,079
3	Paris Saint-Germain	19	46,911
4	Lille OSC	19	34,079
5	AS Saint-Étienne	19	28,400
6	FC Nantes	19	25,238
7	RC Strasbourg	19	25,213
8	Stade Rennais	19	23,675
9	Girondins de Bordeaux	19	21,183
10	OGC Nice	19	19,123
11	SM Caen	19	16,778
12	Toulouse FC	19	16,224
13	EA Guingamp	19	14,731
14	Stade de Reims	19	14,341
15	Montpellier HSC	19	13,829
16	Nîmes Olympique	19	13,827
17	Dijon FCO	19	13,041
18	Angers SCO	19	11,185
19	Amiens SC	19	11,050
20	AS Monaco	19	8,447
