= 2022–23 Ligue 1 =

Ligue 1
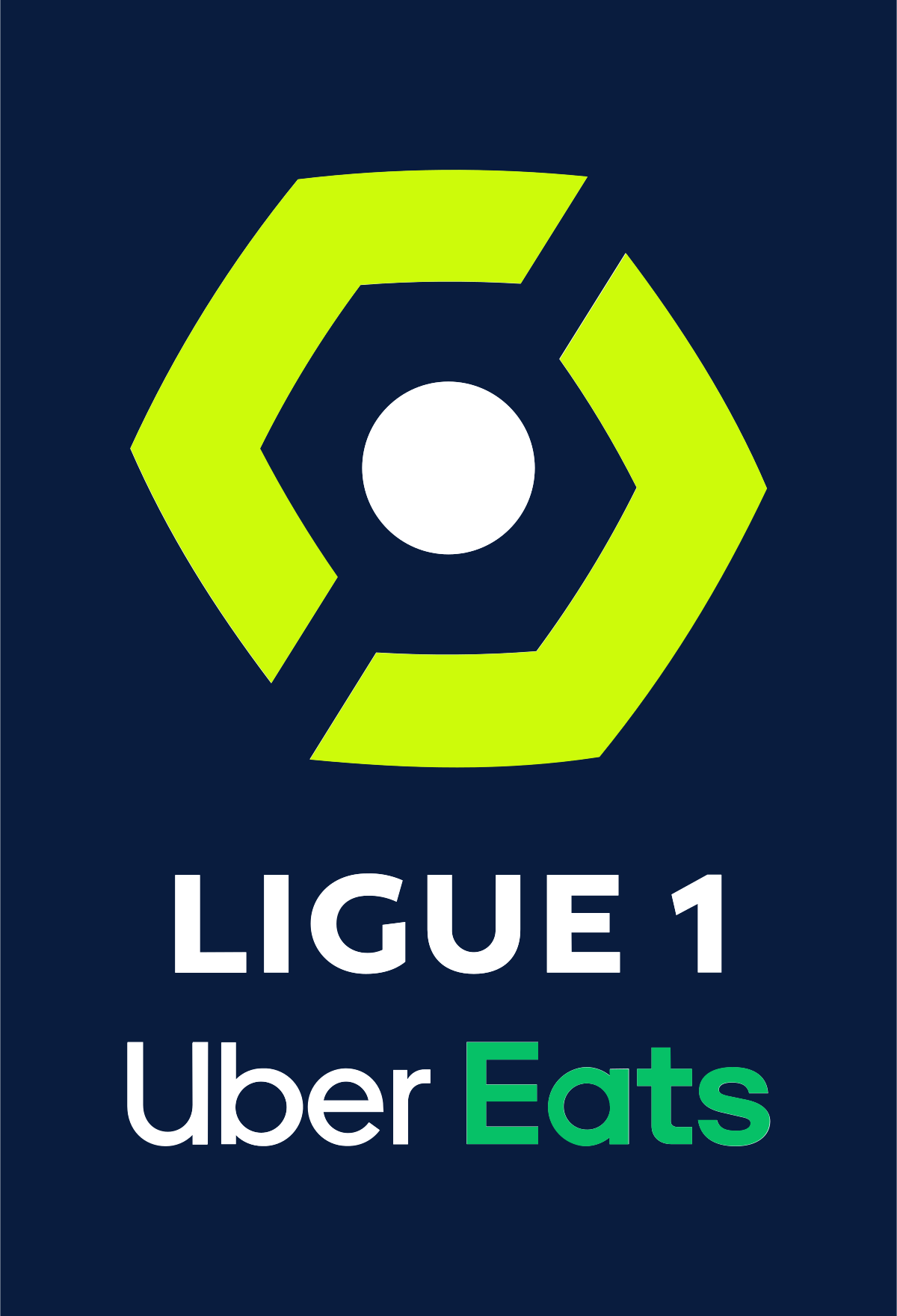
- Season: 2022–23
- Dates: 5 August 2022 – 3 June 2023
- Champions: Paris Saint-Germain; 11th Ligue 1 title 11th French title
- Relegated: Ajaccio; Troyes; Angers; Auxerre
- Champions League: Paris Saint-Germain; Lens; Marseille
- Europa League: Toulouse (as Coupe de France winners); Rennes
- Europa Conference League: Lille
- Matches: 380
- Goals: 1,067 (2.81 per match)
- Top goalscorer: Kylian Mbappé (29 goals)
- Best goalkeeper: Brice Samba (15 clean sheets)
- Biggest home win: Monaco 7–1 Ajaccio (15 January 2023)
- Biggest away win: Brest 0–7 Montpellier (28 August 2022)
- Highest scoring: Lyon 5–4 Montpellier (7 May 2023)
- Longest winning run: Lens (7 matches)
- Longest unbeaten run: Reims (19 matches)
- Longest winless run: Angers; Troyes (21 matches)
- Longest losing run: Angers (13 matches)
- Highest attendance: 65,894; Marseille 0–3 Paris Saint-Germain (26 February 2023)
- Lowest attendance: 3,561; Monaco 3–2 Auxerre (1 February 2023)
- Attendance: 8,997,104 (23,677 per match)

The 2022–23 Ligue 1, also known as Ligue 1 Uber Eats for sponsorship reasons, was the 85th season of the Ligue 1, France's premier football competition. It began on 5 August 2022 and concluded on 3 June 2023.

As the 2022 FIFA World Cup began on 20 November, the last round before the break was held on 12–13 November. The league subsequently resumed on 27 December. Four clubs were relegated to Ligue 2 at the end of the season as the number of clubs was reduced to 18 starting from the 2023–24 season. As a result, no play-offs were held at the end of the season, and this was the last season played with 20 teams.

Paris Saint-Germain were the defending champions, and they won a record-breaking eleventh title with one match to spare, following a 1–1 draw against Strasbourg on 27 May.

== Summary ==
Lens returned to the Champions League group stage for the first time since the 2002–03. Reims went on a record-breaking 19-game unbeaten run under Will Still. Paris Saint-Germain were the defending champions, and secured a record-breaking eleventh title following a 1–1 draw at Strasbourg on the penultimate matchday.

== Teams ==
A total of twenty teams participated in the 2022–23 edition of the Ligue 1.

=== Changes ===
Toulouse (promoted to Ligue 1 after a two-year absence), Ajaccio (promoted after an eight-year absence), and Auxerre (promoted after a ten-year absence) were promoted from the 2021–22 Ligue 2. Bordeaux (relegated after thirty years in the top flight), Metz (relegated after three years in the top flight), and Saint-Étienne (relegated after eighteen years in the top flight) were relegated to 2022–23 Ligue 2.

▲ from 2021–22 Ligue 2	▼ to 2022–23 Ligue 2
Toulouse; Ajaccio; Auxerre	Saint-Étienne; Metz; Bordeaux

=== Stadiums and locations ===
Location of teams in 2022–23 Ligue 1

Club	Location	Venue	Capacity	2021–22 season
Ajaccio	Ajaccio	Stade François Coty	10,446	Ligue 2, 2nd
Angers	Angers	Stade Raymond Kopa	18,752	14th
Auxerre	Auxerre	Stade de l'Abbé-Deschamps	21,379	Ligue 2, 3rd
Brest	Brest	Stade Francis-Le Blé	15,931	11th
Clermont	Clermont-Ferrand	Stade Gabriel Montpied	11,980	17th
Lens	Lens	Stade Bollaert-Delelis	37,705	7th
Lille	Lille	Decathlon Arena Pierre Mauroy Stadium	50,186	10th
Lorient	Lorient	Stade du Moustoir	18,890	16th
Lyon	Lyon	Groupama Stadium	59,186	8th
Marseille	Marseille	Orange Vélodrome	67,394	2nd
Monaco	Monaco	Stade Louis II	18,523	3rd
Montpellier	Montpellier	Stade de la Mosson	32,900	13th
Nantes	Nantes	Stade de la Beaujoire	35,322	9th
Nice	Nice	Allianz Riviera	35,624	5th
Paris Saint-Germain	Paris	Parc des Princes	48,583	1st
Reims	Reims	Stade Auguste Delaune	21,684	12th
Rennes	Rennes	Roazhon Park	29,778	4th
Strasbourg	Strasbourg	Stade de la Meinau	29,230	6th
Toulouse	Toulouse	Stadium Municipal	33,150	Ligue 2, 1st
Troyes	Troyes	Stade de l'Aube	21,684	15th

=== Personnel and kits ===
Team	Manager	Captain	Kit manufacturer	Shirt sponsor (front)	Shirt sponsor (back)	Shirt sponsor (sleeve)	Shorts sponsor	Socks sponsor
Ajaccio	(France) Olivier Pantaloni	(Guadeloupe) Mathieu Coutadeur	Adidas	LMM, Cullettività di Corsica-Collectivité de Corse, AZ habitat	Gamm Vert/CG Plomberie/Résidence Castugna/Pierre Boulangerie Patisserie/D.L.M.C Anfriani/OC Invest/Teddy Smith/biddingsport.net/FL ELEC/Fromagerie Alta Cima/ScorePlay/A Casetta/Petras/BC Automobiles/Marbrerie Di Grazia/AMS Multiservices/Valdu di l'Alivi/Décor 2000/Traiteur Come Prima/Corsica Haché/Oxygo, Madewis, Hôtel Serenada/Fitness Park Ajaccio/Le Marché aux affaires Castellani/CG Plomberie/OC Invest/Suretec/By Migloo/Hotel U Catagnu/A Boxetta, Le Filosorma Galeria	Air Corsica, Provence Monte Cristo/BC Automobiles/Gamm Vert/Le Petit Cheval Blanc/Oxygo	Ajaccio, Europcar	None
Angers	(France) Alexandre Dujeux	(France) Pierrick Capelle	Kappa	Groupe Actual (H)/Le Gaulois (A & 3), Maison de l'Atoll, Angers	Open Energie	P2i	Système U	None
Auxerre	(France) Christophe Pélissier	(Mali) Birama Touré	Macron	Acadomia, X1, SPPE, Servistores	LCR, X1	Groupama	Auxerre, Actis Location	None
Brest	(France) Eric Roy	(France) Pierre Lees-Melou	Adidas	Quéguiner Matériaux (H)/Yaourt Malo (A & 3)/Le Petit Basque (A & 3), SILL (H)/Breizh Cola (A & 3), GUYOT Environnement, Oceania Hotels, Autour des Williams	Écomiam, J.Bervas Automobiles	Charnel Fruits/Guindé/Eaux de Zilia/Caillarec/KOSTUM Maison Caidou/ITC Formation/Triangle Intérim	E.Leclerc, SOFT-Société d'Organisation Financière et Technique	BSP Sécurité
Clermont	(France) Pascal Gastien	(France) Florent Ogier	Uhlsport	Crédit Mutuel, Clermont Ferrand, Puy-de-Dôme, Auvergne-Rhône-Alpes (H)	Systèmes Solaires, Groupe Batipro	Radio SCOOP	Veolia	None
Lens	(France) Franck Haise	(Ivory Coast) Seko Fofana	Puma	Auchan, Groupe Lempereur, Smart Good Things/Nexans	Randstad, Winamax	Aushopping Noyelles	Pas-de-Calais, McDonald's	None
Lille	(Portugal) Paulo Fonseca	(Portugal) José Fonte	New Balance	Cazoo, RIKA, MEL (H)/Hello Lille (A & 3)	Essalmi, Teddy Smith	Aushopping V2	Winamax, Blåkläder	None
Lorient	(France) Régis Le Bris	(France) Laurent Abergel	Umbro	Jean Floc'h, Acadomia, Breizh Cola	KarrGreen, Morbihan	Groupe Actual	BMW Lorient/Mousqueton, B&B Hotels	None
Lyon	(France) Laurent Blanc	(France) Alexandre Lacazette	Adidas	Emirates	OOGarden, Groupe ALILA	MG Motor	Teddy Smith	None
Marseille	(Croatia) Igor Tudor	(France) Dimitri Payet	Puma	Cazoo, Parions Sport	Boulanger	D'Or et de Platine	None	None
Monaco	(Belgium) Philippe Clement	(France) Wissam Ben Yedder	Kappa	eToro, Triangle Intérim	Peace and Sport	None	VBET	None
Montpellier	(Armenia) Michel Der Zakarian	(France) Téji Savanier	Nike	Partouche, FAUN-Environnement, Montpellier Métropole, Smart Good Things	FAUN-Environnement, Sud de France	Loxam	Système U, Viwone	None
Nantes	(France) Pierre Aristouy	(France) Alban Lafont	Macron	Synergie/Groupe AFD (in UEFA matches), Groupe AFD, Proginov	Préservation du Patrimoine, Groupe Millet	LNA Santé/Groupe Millet (in UEFA matches)	ZEbet, Flamino	None
Nice	(France) Didier Digard (caretaker)	(Brazil) Dante	Macron	Ineos	Ineos Grenadier	Ineos Hygienics	Ville de Nice, VBET	None
Paris Saint-Germain	(France) Christophe Galtier	(Brazil) Marquinhos	Nike	Qatar Airways	None	GOAT	None	None
Reims	(Belgium) Will Still	(Morocco) Yunis Abdelhamid	Umbro	Hexaom, Transports Caillot, Crédit Agricole du Nord-Est	SOS Malus, Royaltiz	Triangle Intérim, Grand Reims (H)/Reims (A & 3)	Winamax, Würth MODYF	None
Rennes	(France) Bruno Génésio	(Mali) Hamari Traoré	Puma	Samsic, Del Arte, Groupe Launay, Association ELA	Blot Immobilier	Groupe ROSE	Convivio	None
Strasbourg	(France) Frédéric Antonetti	(France) Dimitri Liénard	Adidas	ÉS Énergies (H)/Winamax (A & 3), Hager, Pierre Schmidt (H)/Stoeffler (A & 3)	Winamax (H)/ÉS Énergies (A & 3), Boulanger	Würth	Soprema, Eurométropole de Strasbourg, Atheo	None
Toulouse	(France) Philippe Montanier	(Belgium) Brecht Dejaegere	Craft	LP Promotion Group, Betway	GLS	Newrest	Sud de France	None
Troyes	(Australia) Patrick Kisnorbo	(French Guiana) Yoann Salmier	Le Coq Sportif	Winamax, Lex Persona, norelem, Festilight	Sinfin, Amplitude Groupe Automobile	Century 21 Groupe Martinot	Ville de Troyes, LCR	None

=== Managerial changes ===
Team	Outgoing manager	Manner of departure	Date of vacancy	Position in table	Incoming manager	Date of appointment
Lille	(France) Jocelyn Gourvennec	Sacked	16 June 2022	Pre-season	(Portugal) Paulo Fonseca	29 June 2022
Lorient	(France) Christophe Pélissier	Sacked	19 June 2022	Pre-season	(France) Régis Le Bris	27 June 2022
Nice	(France) Christophe Galtier	Mutual consent	27 June 2022	Pre-season	(Switzerland) Lucien Favre	27 June 2022
Paris Saint-Germain	(Argentina) Mauricio Pochettino	Mutual consent	1 July 2022	Pre-season	(France) Christophe Galtier	5 July 2022
Marseille	(Argentina) Jorge Sampaoli	Resigned	1 July 2022	Pre-season	(Croatia) Igor Tudor	4 July 2022
Lyon	(Netherlands) Peter Bosz	Sacked	9 October 2022	7th	(France) Laurent Blanc	9 October 2022
Auxerre	(France) Jean-Marc Furlan	Sacked	11 October 2022	16th	(France) Christophe Pélissier	26 October 2022
Brest	(Armenia) Michel Der Zakarian	Sacked	11 October 2022	20th	(France) Eric Roy	3 January 2023
Reims	(Spain) Óscar García	Sacked	13 October 2022	20th	(Belgium) Will Still	13 October 2022
Montpellier	(France) Olivier Dall'Oglio	Sacked	17 October 2022	11th	(France) Romain Pitau	14 November 2022
Troyes	(France) Bruno Irles	Sacked	8 November 2022	13th	(Australia) Patrick Kisnorbo	23 November 2022
Angers	(France) Gérald Baticle	Sacked	22 December 2022	20th	(France) Abdel Bouhazama	5 January 2023
Strasbourg	(France) Julien Stéphan	Sacked	9 January 2023	19th	(France) Frédéric Antonetti	21 January 2023
Nice	(Switzerland) Lucien Favre	Sacked	9 January 2023	11th	(France) Didier Digard (caretaker)	9 January 2023
Montpellier	(France) Romain Pitau	Sacked	7 February 2023	15th	(Armenia) Michel Der Zakarian	8 February 2023
Angers	(France) Abdel Bouhazama	Resigned	7 March 2023	20th	(France) Alexandre Dujeux	7 March 2023
Nantes	(France) Antoine Kombouaré	Sacked	9 May 2023	17th	(France) Pierre Aristouy	9 May 2023

== League table ==
Pos	Team	Pld	W	D	L	GF	GA	GD	Pts	Qualification or relegation
1	Paris Saint-Germain (C)	38	27	4	7	89	40	+49	85	Qualification for the Champions League group stage
2	Lens	38	25	9	4	68	29	+39	84	Qualification for the Champions League group stage
3	Marseille	38	22	7	9	67	40	+27	73	Qualification for the Champions League third qualifying round
4	Rennes	38	21	5	12	69	39	+30	68	Qualification for the Europa League group stage
5	Lille	38	19	10	9	65	44	+21	67	Qualification for the Europa Conference League play-off round
6	Monaco	38	19	8	11	70	58	+12	65	
7	Lyon	38	18	8	12	65	47	+18	62	
8	Clermont	38	17	8	13	45	49	−4	59	
9	Nice	38	15	13	10	48	37	+11	58	
10	Lorient	38	15	10	13	52	53	−1	55	
11	Reims	38	12	15	11	45	45	0	51	
12	Montpellier	38	15	5	18	65	62	+3	50	
13	Toulouse	38	13	9	16	51	57	−6	48	Qualification for the Europa League group stage (Note: Toulouse qualified for the Europa League group stage as the 2022–23 Coupe de France winners.)
14	Brest	38	11	11	16	44	54	−10	44	
15	Strasbourg	38	9	13	16	51	59	−8	40	
16	Nantes	38	7	15	16	37	55	−18	36	
17	Auxerre (R)	38	8	11	19	35	63	−28	35	Relegation to Ligue 2
18	Ajaccio (R)	38	7	5	26	23	74	−51	26	Relegation to Ligue 2
19	Troyes (R)	38	4	12	22	45	81	−36	24	Relegation to Ligue 2
20	Angers (R)	38	4	6	28	33	81	−48	18	Relegation to Ligue 2

Source: Ligue 1
Rules for classification: 1) Points; 2) Goal difference; 3) Head-to-head points; 4) Head-to-head goal difference; 5) Head-to-head goals scored; 6) Head-to-head away goals scored; 7) Goals scored; 8) Away goals scored; 9) Fair-play points (Note: Head-to-head record is used only after all the matches between the teams in question have been played).
(C) Champions; (R) Relegated

== Results ==
Home \ Away	AJA	ANG	AUX	BRE	CLE	LEN	LIL	LOR	OL	OM	ASM	MON	FCN	NIC	PSG	REI	REN	STR	TFC	TRO
Ajaccio	—	1–0	0–3	0–0	1–3	0–0	1–3	0–1	0–2	1–0	0–2	0–1	0–2	0–1	0–3	0–1	0–5	4–2	0–0	2–1
Angers	1–2	—	1–1	1–3	1–2	1–2	1–0	1–2	1–3	0–3	1–2	2–1	0–0	1–1	1–2	2–4	1–2	2–3	0–2	2–1
Auxerre	1–0	2–2	—	1–1	1–1	1–3	1–1	1–3	2–1	0–2	2–3	0–2	2–1	1–1	1–2	0–0	0–0	1–0	0–5	1–0
Brest	0–1	4–0	1–0	—	2–1	1–1	0–0	1–2	2–4	1–1	1–2	0–7	2–0	1–0	1–2	0–0	1–2	1–1	3–1	2–1
Clermont	2–1	2–1	2–1	1–3	—	0–4	0–2	2–0	2–1	0–2	0–2	1–1	0–0	1–0	0–5	1–0	2–1	1–1	2–0	1–3
Lens	3–0	3–0	1–0	3–2	2–1	—	1–1	5–2	1–0	2–1	3–0	1–0	3–1	0–1	3–1	2–1	2–1	2–1	3–0	1–0
Lille	3–0	1–0	4–1	2–1	0–0	1–0	—	3–1	3–3	2–1	4–3	2–1	2–1	1–2	1–7	1–1	1–1	2–0	2–1	5–1
Lorient	3–0	0–0	0–1	2–1	2–1	1–3	2–1	—	3–1	0–0	2–2	0–2	3–2	1–2	1–2	0–0	2–1	2–1	0–1	2–0
Lyon	2–1	5–0	2–1	0–0	0–1	2–1	1–0	0–0	—	1–2	3–1	5–4	1–1	1–1	0–1	3–0	3–1	1–2	1–1	4–1
Marseille	1–2	3–1	2–1	1–2	1–0	0–1	2–1	3–1	1–0	—	1–1	1–1	2–1	1–3	0–3	4–1	1–1	2–2	6–1	3–1
Monaco	7–1	2–0	3–2	1–0	1–1	1–4	0–0	3–1	2–1	2–3	—	0–4	4–1	0–3	3–1	0–1	1–1	4–3	1–2	2–4
Montpellier	2–0	5–0	1–2	3–0	2–1	1–1	1–3	1–1	1–2	1–2	0–2	—	0–3	2–3	1–3	1–1	1–0	2–1	1–2	3–2
Nantes	2–2	1–0	1–0	4–1	1–1	0–0	1–1	1–0	0–0	0–2	2–2	0–3	—	2–2	0–3	0–3	0–1	0–2	3–1	2–2
Nice	3–0	0–1	1–1	1–0	1–2	0–0	1–0	1–1	3–1	0–3	0–1	6–1	1–1	—	0–2	0–0	2–1	1–1	0–0	3–2
Paris SG	5–0	2–0	5–0	1–0	2–3	3–1	4–3	1–3	0–1	1–0	1–1	5–2	4–2	2–1	—	1–1	0–2	2–1	2–1	4–3
Reims	1–0	2–2	2–1	1–1	2–4	1–1	1–0	4–2	1–1	1–2	0–3	1–3	1–0	0–0	0–0	—	3–1	0–2	3–0	4–0
Rennes	2–1	4–2	5–0	3–1	2–0	0–1	1–3	0–1	3–2	0–1	2–0	3–0	3–0	2–1	1–0	3–0	—	3–0	2–1	4–0
Strasbourg	3–1	2–1	2–0	0–1	0–0	2–2	0–3	1–1	1–2	2–2	1–2	2–0	1–1	2–0	1–1	1–1	1–3	—	1–2	2–3
Toulouse	2–0	3–2	1–1	1–1	0–1	0–1	0–2	2–2	1–2	2–3	0–2	4–2	0–0	1–1	0–3	1–0	3–1	2–2	—	4–1
Troyes	1–1	3–1	1–1	2–2	0–2	1–1	1–1	2–2	1–3	0–2	2–2	0–1	0–0	0–1	1–3	2–2	1–1	1–1	0–3	—

Source: Ligue 1
Legend: Blue = home team win; Yellow = draw; Red = away team win.
For upcoming matches, an "a" indicates there is an article about the rivalry between the two participants.

== Season statistics ==
=== Top goalscorers ===
Rank	Player	Club	Goals
1	(France) Kylian Mbappé	Paris Saint-Germain	29
2	(France) Alexandre Lacazette	Lyon	27
3	(Canada) Jonathan David	Lille	24
4	(United States) Folarin Balogun	Reims	21
4	(Belgium) Loïs Openda	Lens	21
6	(Senegal) Habib Diallo	Strasbourg	20
7	(France) Wissam Ben Yedder	Monaco	19
7	(France) Elye Wahi	Montpellier	19
9	(Nigeria) Terem Moffi	Lorient/Nice (Note: Played for Lorient until matchday 20, scoring 12 goals)	18
10	(Argentina) Lionel Messi	Paris Saint-Germain	16

=== Clean sheets ===
Rank	Player	Club	Clean sheets
1	(France) Brice Samba	Lens	15
2	(France) Yehvann Diouf	Reims	14
3	(Italy) Gianluigi Donnarumma	Paris Saint-Germain	13
4	(France) Steve Mandanda	Rennes	12
5	(France) Alban Lafont	Nantes	11
5	(Denmark) Kasper Schmeichel	Nice	11
7	(France) Lucas Chevalier	Lille	10
7	(France) Mory Diaw	Clermont	10
7	(Spain) Pau López	Marseille	10
10	(France) Maxime Dupé	Toulouse	9
10	(Germany) Alexander Nübel	Monaco	9

=== Hat-tricks ===
Player	Club	Against	Result	Date
(France) Florian Sotoca	Lens	Brest	3–2 (H)	7 August 2022
(France) Kylian Mbappé	Paris Saint-Germain	Lille	7–1 (A)	21 August 2022
(France) Wissam Ben Yedder	Monaco	Nantes	4–1 (H)	2 October 2022
(Belgium) Loïs Openda	Lens	Toulouse	3–0 (H)	28 October 2022
(France) Wissam Ben Yedder	Monaco	Ajaccio	7–1 (H)	15 January 2023
(United States) Folarin Balogun	Reims	Lorient	4–2 (H)	1 February 2023
(Canada) Jonathan David	Lille	Lyon	3–3 (H)	10 March 2023
(Belgium) Loïs Openda^{Fastest}	Lens	Clermont	4–0 (A)	12 March 2023
(France) Elye Wahi^{4}	Montpellier	Lyon	4–5 (A)	7 May 2023
(France) Alexandre Lacazette^{4}	Lyon	Montpellier	5–4 (H)	7 May 2023
(France) Amine Gouiri	Rennes	Ajaccio	5–0 (A)	21 May 2023

Note

^{4} Player scored 4 goals
^{Fastest} Player scored fastest hat-trick in Ligue 1 history

=== Discipline ===
==== Player ====
- Most yellow cards: 12
  - (France) Benjamin André (Lille)
- Most red cards: 3
  - (Ivory Coast) Emmanuel Agbadou (Reims)
  - (France) Téji Savanier (Montpellier)

==== Team ====
- Most yellow cards: 83
  - Lille
- Most red cards: 9
  - Montpellier
- Fewest yellow cards: 42
  - Lorient
- Fewest red cards: 1
  - Lille

== Awards ==
=== Monthly ===
Month	Player of the Month		Ref.
Month	Player	Club	Ref.
August	(Brazil) Neymar	Paris Saint-Germain	
September	(Argentina) Lionel Messi	Paris Saint-Germain	
October	(France) Martin Terrier	Rennes	
November/December	(France) Kylian Mbappé	Paris Saint-Germain	
January	(France) Wissam Ben Yedder	Monaco	
February	(France) Kylian Mbappé	Paris Saint-Germain	
March	(Belgium) Loïs Openda	Lens	
April	(Belgium) Loïs Openda	Lens	

=== Annual ===
Award	Winner	Club	Ref.
Player of the Season	(France) Kylian Mbappé	Paris Saint-Germain	
Young Player of the Season	(Portugal) Nuno Mendes	Paris Saint-Germain	
Foreign Player of the Season	(Argentina) Lionel Messi	Paris Saint-Germain	
Goalkeeper of the Season	(France) Brice Samba	Lens	
Goal of the Season	(France) Elye Wahi	Montpellier	
Manager of the Season	(France) Franck Haise	Lens	

Team of the Year
Goalkeeper	(France) Brice Samba (Lens)			
Defenders	(Morocco) Achraf Hakimi (Paris Saint-Germain)	(Democratic Republic of the Congo) Chancel Mbemba (Marseille)	(Austria) Kevin Danso (Lens)	(Portugal) Nuno Mendes (Paris Saint-Germain)
Midfielders	(France) Khéphren Thuram (Nice)	(France) Valentin Rongier (Marseille)		(Ivory Coast) Seko Fofana (Lens)
Forwards	(Argentina) Lionel Messi (Paris Saint-Germain)	(Belgium) Loïs Openda (Lens)		(France) Kylian Mbappé (Paris Saint-Germain)

== Attendances ==
#	Football club	Home games	Average attendance
1	Olympique de Marseille	17	62,571
2	Paris Saint-Germain	17	46,221
3	Olympique lyonnais	17	46,058
4	RC Lens	17	37,653
5	Lille OSC	17	36,149
6	FC Nantes	17	30,002
7	Stade rennais	17	27,195
8	RC Strasbourg	17	25,278
9	Toulouse FC	17	23,966
10	OGC Nice	17	22,286
11	AJ auxerroise	17	15,576
12	FC Lorient	17	14,992
13	Montpellier HSC	17	13,804
14	Stade de Reims	17	13,602
15	Stade brestois 29	17	12,657
16	Clermont Foot	17	11,270
17	ESTAC	17	10,011
18	Angers SCO	17	9,616
19	AC Ajaccio	17	7,527
20	AS Monaco	17	7,095
