= Stéphane Tanguy =

French footballer (born 1975)

Personal information
- Date of birth: January 31, 1975 (age 51)
- Place of birth: Brest, France
- Height: 1.75 m (5 ft 9 in)
- Position: Defender

Senior career*
Years	Team	Apps	(Gls)
1991–1995	Stade Brestois	28	(2)
1995–2001	Caen	110	(1)
2001–2002	CS Louhans-Cuiseaux		
2002–2004	ES Wasquehal		
2004–2011	AS Cherbourg		
- * Club domestic league appearances and goals as of 13:58, 30 November 2009 (UTC)

Stéphane Tanguy (born January 31, 1975, in Brest) is a French former professional footballer.

He played on the professional level in Ligue 1 for SM Caen and Ligue 2 for Stade Brestois 29, SM Caen and ES Wasquehal.

His brother Arnaud Tanguy also played in Ligue 1 for SM Caen.
