= Abdel Bouhazama =

French football manager and former player (born 1969)

Personal information
- Full name: Abdelaziz Bouhazama
- Date of birth: 4 January 1969 (age 57)
- Place of birth: Saint-Martin-d'Hères, France
- Height: 1.82 m (6 ft 0 in)
- Position: Midfielder

Senior career*
| Years | Team | Apps | (Gls) |
| 1986–1987 | Abarán | | |
| 1988–1990 | Grenoble B | | |
| 1990–1996 | Grenoble | | |
| 1996–1997 | Tours | | |
| 1997–2002 | Châtellerault | | |
| 2002–2003 | Tours | 27 | (0) |

Managerial career
- 2003–2004: Tours (assistant)
- 2004–2005: Tours B
- 2005–2006: Tours B (assistant)
- 2007–2009: Saint-Étienne (youth)
- 2009–2013: Saint-Étienne U19
- 2015–2017: Angers U19
- 2017–2022: Angers B
- 2021–2022: Angers U19
- 2022–2023: Angers
- * Club domestic league appearances and goals

Abdelaziz "Abdel" Bouhazama (born 4 January 1969) is a French professional football manager and former player. As a player, he was a midfielder.

== Managerial career ==
During his time as the head of Angers's youth academy, Bouhazama was accused of mistreating young players of the club. He has been accused of humiliating, insulting, intimidating, and threatening players, and his management style has been described as "management by terror". Several former players of Angers's academy, such as Pierre Freuchet and Joseph Séry, have explicitly testified against Bouhazama.

On 24 November 2022, Angers manager Gérald Baticle was suspended by the club, and replaced by Bouhazama on an interim basis. The former was eventually sacked on 22 December, with Bouhazama taking charge of the team following the conclusion of the break for the 2022 FIFA World Cup. He made his Ligue 1 managerial debut on 28 December, an eventual 1–0 defeat away to Ajaccio. On 5 January 2023, one day after his 54th birthday, Bouhazama was confirmed as head coach of Angers on a permanent basis following his interim spell.

Bouhazama resigned on 7 March 2023 after making inappropriate remarks during a pre-match team talk preceding a 5–0 defeat against Montpellier two days earlier. He reportedly had justified the inclusion of Ilyes Chetti, who had been charged for sexual assault a month prior, in Angers's starting lineup by saying "it's not that serious, we have all touched girls".

== Personal life ==
Born in France, Bouhazama is of Moroccan descent.

== Managerial statistics ==
As of match played 7 March 2023

| Team | From | To | Record | | | | | Ref. |
| Team | From | To | P | W | D | L | Win % | Ref. |
|---|---|---|---|---|---|---|---|---|
| Angers | 24 November 2022 | 7 March 2023 | 14 | 1 | 4 | 9 | 7.14 | |
| Total | | | 14 | 1 | 4 | 9 | 7.14 | — |

== Honours ==
=== Manager ===
Saint-Étienne U19

- Coupe Gambardella runner-up: 2010–11, 2011–12

Angers B

- Championnat National 3: 2018–19
