= Arnaud Tanguy =

French footballer (born 1976)

Personal information
- Date of birth: 21 January 1976 (age 50)
- Place of birth: Brest, France
- Height: 1.73 m (5 ft 8 in)
- Position: Midfielder

Senior career*
Years	Team	Apps	(Gls)
1993–1995	Stade Brestois	55	(0)
1995–2000	Caen	25	(1)
2000–2001	RC France	27	(0)
- * Club domestic league appearances and goals

Arnaud Tanguy (born 21 January 1976) is a French former professional football player.

He played on the professional level in Ligue 1 and Ligue 2 for SM Caen, with his brother Stéphane Tanguy.

After one season in Championnat National for RC France, he retired from football in 2001.
