= Vincent Volpe =

American businessman (born 1960)

Vincent R. Volpe Jr. (born 1960) is an American businessman. Since 2015, he has been the owner of French soccer club Le Havre AC.

Volpe began working at Dresser-Rand in 1981, becoming chief executive officer in 2000. In 2015, he sold the company to Siemens and bought Le Havre AC. His team won promotion to Ligue 1 as champions of Ligue 2 in 2022–23.

== Biography ==
Born in the United States and of Italian origin, Volpe qualified as an engineer. He attended Lehigh University, graduating in 1980. He was a member of Pi Lambda Phi fraternity, and received its Big Pi award in June 2025.

In 1981, Volpe began working at Dresser, a company making rotating equipment in the oil business. He was transferred to locations around the world, including Le Havre in France in 1990, where he met his wife Christine. In 2000, he became chief executive officer of the renamed Dresser-Rand, with 12,000 employees and a turnover of $3.5 billion.

Volpe left Dresser-Rand in August 2015 after its sale to Siemens. Having been paid $8 million a year while at the company, he invested by buying 90% of Le Havre AC, and a German wind turbine company. He invested his first €3.5 million into the club in June 2015 while promising to raise it to €10 million if necessary, and convinced the local government to suspend the €1.2 million rent on the Stade Océane. Becoming president in July, named a new board with associates from Dresser-Rand including his wife, named Arnaud Tanguy as director, and brought in former United States men's national soccer team coach Bob Bradley. He has mostly resided in Houston during his presidency.

Volpe desired for the Stade Océane to be used for other events, such as Top 14 rugby union semi-finals, which it did not gain, and the 2019 FIFA Women's World Cup, which it did. He mentioned the development of the club's women's team as a priority.

In the 2017–18 Ligue 2, Le Havre finished fourth and contested the promotion playoffs against AC Ajaccio. Volpe was kicked in the back while watching the match, after Jean-Philippe Mateta had put Le Havre in front in overtime; Volpe and Le Havre deputy Agnès Firmin-Le Bodo were then evacuated to the locker rooms. Volpe unsuccessfully appealed to the Ligue de Football Professionnel for Le Havre to be awarded the match and financial compensation, due to other instances of violence from Ajaccio fans.

In June 2022, Volpe enacted a change in the administration of Le Havre AC, giving the presidency to Jean-Michel Roussier and the post of sporting director to Mathieu Bodmer. Bodmer combined players from the club's academy such as Yassine Kechta, and signed players with experience of promotion such as goalkeeper Arthur Desmas, leading Le Havre to the 2022–23 Ligue 2 title and a return to Ligue 1 for the first time in 14 years.
