= Pierre Aristouy =

French football manager (born 1979)

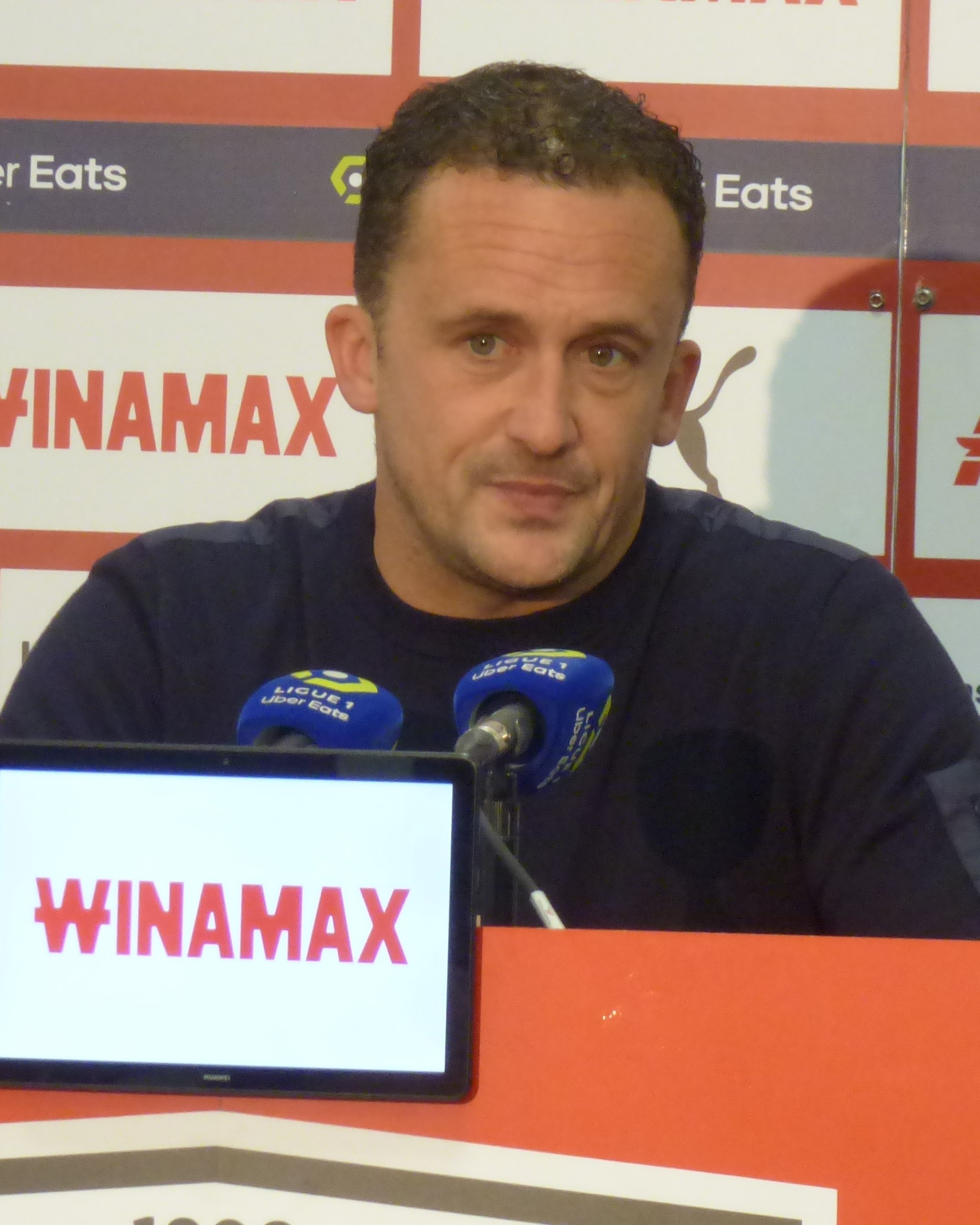
- Aristouy in 2023

Personal information
- Date of birth: 30 December 1979 (age 46)
- Place of birth: Mont-de-Marsan, France
- Height: 1.80 m (5 ft 11 in)
- Position: Forward

Youth career
- 1993–1994: Stade Montois
- 1994–1999: Nantes

Senior career*
Years	Team	Apps	(Gls)
1997–2001	Nantes B	5	(4)
1999–2004	Nantes	9	(0)
2002–2003	→ Grenoble (loan)	19	(1)
2004–2005	Bayonne	34	(9)
2005–2006	Entente SSG	26	(10)
2006–2009	Pau	83	(29)
2009–2010	JA Dax		
2010–2012	Mont-de-Marsan	39	(19)

Managerial career
- 2014–2017: Mont-de-Marsan
- 2017–2021: Nantes B
- 2021–2023: Nantes U19
- 2023: Nantes
- * Club domestic league appearances and goals

Pierre Aristouy (born 20 December 1979) is a French football manager and former player who played as a forward. He was most recently head coach of Ligue 1 club Nantes.

== Playing career ==
Aristouy was a promising youth player at Stade Montois, before moving to Nantes youth academy in 1994. He began his senior career with them in 1999, and was part of the squad that won the 2000–01 French Division 1. He shortly after went on a short loan to Grenoble for the 2002–2003 season, and moved to Bayonne in 2004. He followed that up with a stint at Entente SSG in 2005, followed by Pau FC in 2006 where he became captain. He ended his career with his youth club Stade Montois in 2012.

== Managerial career ==
Aristouy began his managerial career with his childhood club Stade Montois in 2014, and helped them finish in the top half of the table on the three seasons he was there. He moved to the reserves of Nantes in 2017, earning successive promotions from 2018 to 2019, finishing at the Championnat National 2. In the summer of 2021, he was moved to Nantes U19 squad and again helped them win the league in his debut season. On 9 May 2023, he was appointed the manager of the senior Nantes team in the Ligue 1. The club was facing relegation in their last four games, but a win against Angers on the last game of the season helped the club stay in Ligue 1.

== Honours ==
=== Player ===
Nantes

- Ligue 1: 2000–01

=== Manager ===
Nantes U19

- Championnat National U19: 2021–22
