= Franck Haise =

French footballer (born 1971)

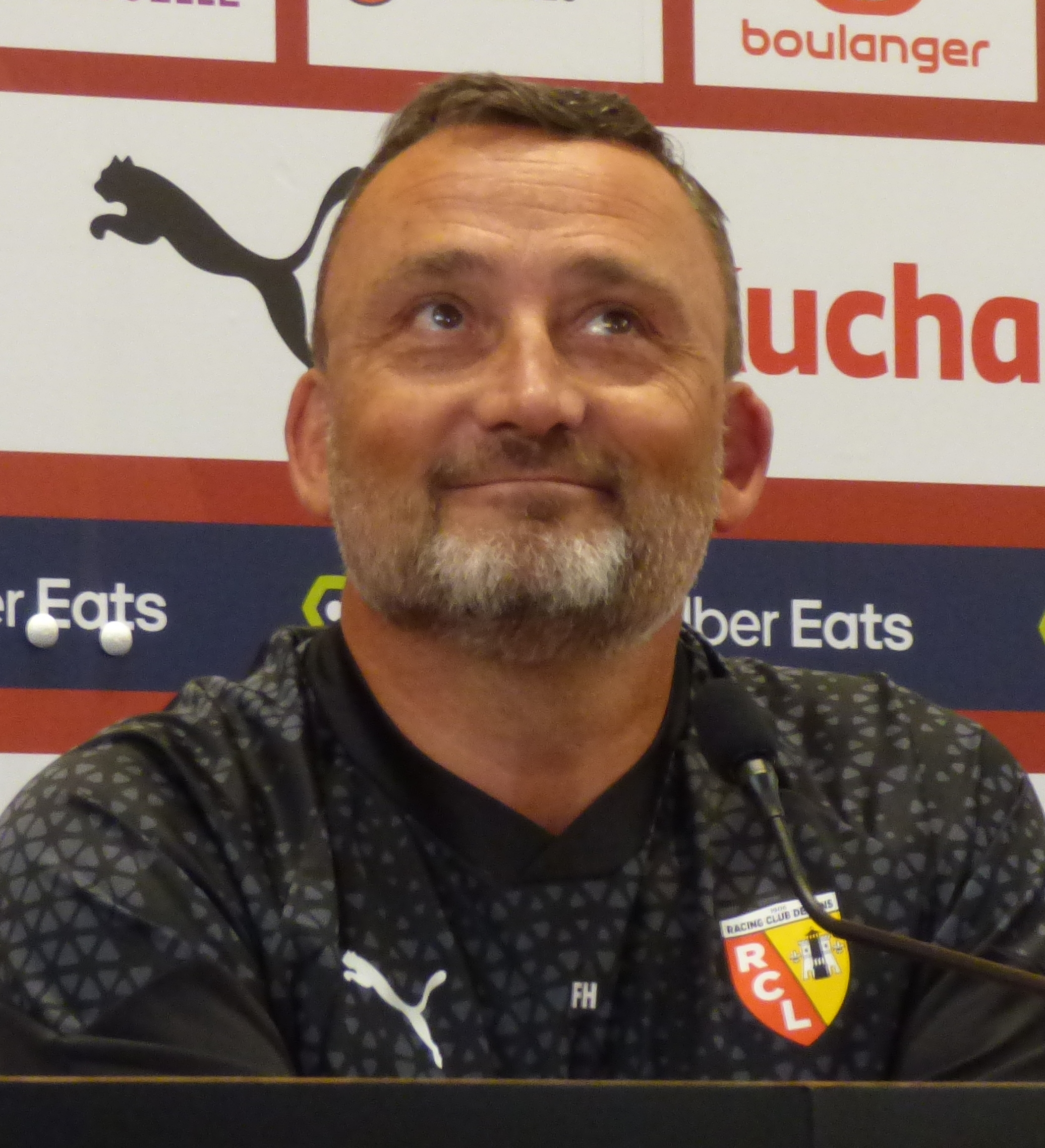
- Haise as manager of Lens in 2023

Personal information
- Full name: Franck Armel Gérard Haise
- Date of birth: 15 April 1971 (age 55)
- Place of birth: Mont-Saint-Aignan, Seine-Maritime, France
- Position: Midfielder

Team information
- Current team: Rennes (head coach)

Senior career*
| Years | Team | Apps | (Gls) |
| 1988–1995 | Rouen | 104 | (4) |
| 1995–1997 | Laval | 68 | (0) |
| 1997–1999 | Beauvais | 53 | (3) |
| 1999–2002 | Laval | 61 | (0) |
| 2002–2004 | Angers | 31 | (0) |
| Total | | 317 | (7) |

Managerial career
- 2003–2006: Mayenne
- 2012–2013: Changé
- 2013–2015: Lorient B
- 2015–2016: Lorient (assistant)
- 2016: Lorient (caretaker)
- 2017–2020: Lens B
- 2020–2024: Lens
- 2024–2025: Nice
- 2026–: Rennes
- * Club domestic league appearances and goals

Franck Armel Gérard Haise (born 15 April 1971) is a French professional football manager and former player who is currently the head coach of Ligue 1 club Rennes. As a player, he was a midfielder, spending most of his career in Ligue 2.

== Early life ==
Franck Armel Gérard Haise was born on 15 April 1971 in Mont-Saint-Aignan, Seine-Maritime.

== Managerial career ==
=== Lens ===
On 25 February 2020 and after coaching the reserve team for 3 seasons, Haise became the head coach of Lens, following the dismissal of Philippe Montanier.

On 27 May 2023, he led Lens to win 3–0 against Ajaccio in the 38th and final matchweek and qualify for the Champions League for the third time in their history after 1998–99 and 2002–03, finishing with 84 points only 1 point behind Paris Saint-Germain.

=== Nice ===
On 6 June 2024, Haise became the head coach of Ligue 1 club Nice. On 29 December 2025, following a poor start to the 2025–26 campaign, he was sacked and replaced by Claude Puel.

=== Rennes ===
On 18 February 2026, Haise became the manager of Ligue 1 side Rennes.

== Coaching style ==
Haise has generally set up Lens in a 3-4-1-2 formation, although he has at times used a 3-5-2 and a 3–4–3.

Despite mainly using a back three at Lens, he has stated, "I don’t have a favourite system. For some time now, we have often played 3-4-1-2 or 3-5-2 with the midfielder moving. This is the one I use because it more closely matches the squad and the players".

== Career statistics ==
=== Player ===
Appearances and goals by club, season and competition
| Club | Season | League | | | National cup | | Total | |
| Club | Season | Division | Apps | Goals | Apps | Goals | Apps | Goals |
|---|---|---|---|---|---|---|---|---|
| Rouen | 1988–89 | Division 2 | 1 | 0 | 0 | 0 | 1 | 0 |
| Rouen | 1989–90 | Division 2 | 0 | 0 | 0 | 0 | 0 | 0 |
| Rouen | 1990–91 | Division 2 | 22 | 1 | 1 | 0 | 23 | 1 |
| Rouen | 1991–92 | Division 2 | 29 | 2 | 1 | 0 | 30 | 2 |
| Rouen | 1992–93 | Division 2 | 22 | 0 | 2 | 0 | 24 | 0 |
| Rouen | 1993–94 | Division 2 | 29 | 1 | 1 | 0 | 30 | 1 |
| Rouen | 1994–95 | National | 1 | 0 | 1 | 0 | 2 | 0 |
| Rouen | Total | | 104 | 4 | 6 | 0 | 110 | 4 |
| Laval | 1995–96 | Division 2 | 30 | 0 | 4 | 0 | 34 | 0 |
| Laval | 1996–97 | Division 2 | 38 | 0 | 6 | 0 | 44 | 0 |
| Laval | Total | | 68 | 0 | 10 | 0 | 78 | 0 |
| Beauvais | 1997–98 | Division 2 | 33 | 1 | 3 | 1 | 36 | 2 |
| Beauvais | 1998–99 | Division 2 | 20 | 2 | 0 | 0 | 20 | 2 |
| Beauvais | Total | | 53 | 3 | 3 | 1 | 56 | 4 |
| Laval | 1999–2000 | Division 2 | 18 | 0 | 1 | 0 | 19 | 0 |
| Laval | 2000–01 | Division 2 | 17 | 0 | 0 | 0 | 17 | 0 |
| Laval | 2001–02 | Division 2 | 26 | 0 | 2 | 0 | 28 | 0 |
| Laval | Total | | 61 | 0 | 3 | 0 | 64 | 0 |
| Angers | 2002–03 | National | 29 | 0 | 4 | 0 | 33 | 0 |
| Angers | 2003–04 | Ligue 2 | 2 | 0 | 0 | 0 | 2 | 0 |
| Angers | Total | | 31 | 0 | 4 | 0 | 35 | 0 |
| Career total | | | 317 | 7 | 26 | 1 | 343 | 8 |

=== Manager ===
As of match played 22 November 2026

Managerial record by team and tenure
| Team | From | To | Record | | | | | | | | Ref |
| Team | From | To | G | W | D | L | GF | GA | GD | Win % | Ref |
|---|---|---|---|---|---|---|---|---|---|---|---|
| Lorient (caretaker) | 24 October 2016 | 8 November 2016 | 3 | 0 | 1 | 2 | 5 | 7 | −2 | 0.00 | |
| Lens | 25 February 2020 | 30 June 2024 | 167 | 79 | 46 | 42 | 259 | 197 | +62 | 47.31 | |
| Nice | 1 July 2024 | 29 December 2025 | 70 | 24 | 15 | 31 | 101 | 107 | −6 | 34.29 | |
| Rennes | 18 February 2026 | present | 27 | 14 | 6 | 7 | 51 | 40 | +11 | 51.85 | |
| Total | | | 267 | 117 | 68 | 82 | 416 | 351 | +65 | 43.82 | — |

== Honours ==
Individual

- Ligue 1 Manager of the Year: 2022–23
- French Manager of the Year: 2022–23
