= Christophe Pélissier (football manager) =

French football manager (born 1965)

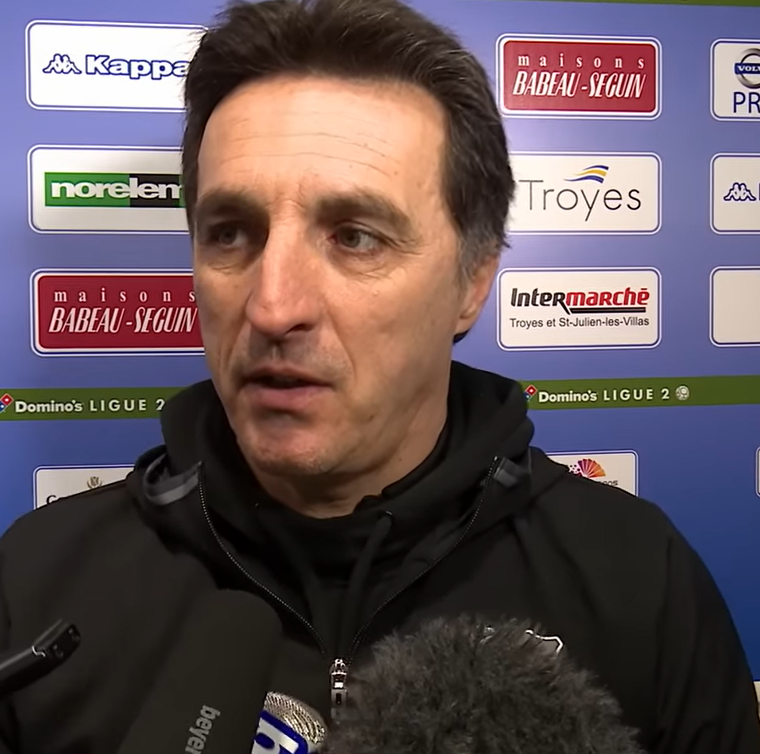
- Pelissier in 2017

Personal information
- Date of birth: 5 October 1965 (age 61)
- Place of birth: Revel, Haute-Garonne, France
- Position: Midfielder

Senior career*
Years	Team	Apps	(Gls)
1983–1990	Revel		
1990–1995	Muret		
1995–1996	Carcassonne		
1996–2000	Revel		

Managerial career
- 2000–2006: Revel
- 2006–2007: Muret
- 2007–2014: Luzenac
- 2014–2019: Amiens
- 2019–2022: Lorient
- 2022–2026: Auxerre
- * Club domestic league appearances and goals

Christophe Pélissier (born 5 October 1965) is a French football manager and former player who played as a midfielder. He was most recently manager of Auxerre.

== Managerial career ==
Pélissier began his managerial career with his former clubs Revel and Muret. In 2007, he helped Luzenac win the amateur 2014 Championnat National and earned promotion into the professional Ligue 2 for the first time. However, the club was prohibited from joining the Ligue 2 for non-sporting reasons, and shortly thereafter Pélissier left the club.

In 2014, Pélissier joined Amiens, and helped them get promoted into the Ligue 1 for the first time in their history. On 29 May 2019, Pélissier became the manager of Lorient.

== Managerial statistics ==
As of match played 17 May 2026

Managerial record by team and tenure
Team	From	To	Record				
Team	From	To	P	W	D	L	Win %
Luzenac	1 July 2007	10 September 2014	190	67	57	66	35.26
Amiens	31 December 2014	28 May 2019	177	62	48	67	35.03
Lorient	29 May 2019	26 June 2022	112	40	24	48	35.71
Auxerre	26 October 2022	22 May 2026	140	50	38	52	35.71
Total			619	219	167	233	35.38

== Honours ==
=== Manager ===
Lorient

- Ligue 2: 2019–20

Auxerre

- Ligue 2: 2023–24

Individual

- UNFP Ligue 2 Manager of the Year: 2023–24
