= Winamax =

French gambling company

- Industry: Gambling
- Founded: 1999; 27 years ago
- Founders: Max Derhy
- Headquarters: Paris, France
- Key people: Christophe Schaming
- Products: Online poker & sports betting
- Website: www.winamax.fr

Winamax is a French gambling company that operates online poker and sports betting platforms. Founded in 1999 as a video game publisher, the company later transitioned into online gambling.

== History ==
Winamax was founded in 1999 as a video game publisher. The company later shifted its focus to online gambling, developing platforms for poker and sports betting.

Until 2015, the company was the main shirt sponsor of AS Saint-Étienne.

In 2019, Winamax became the main shirt sponsor of Granada CF and renewed the agreement in 2020.

In 2020, the company signed a three-year sponsorship agreement with RC Strasbourg Alsace.

In the 2021–22 Ligue 1 season, Winamax sponsored FC Girondins de Bordeaux. The partnership ended after the company published social media posts that were criticised for mocking the club's performance.

In the 2022–23 season, Winamax was the main shirt sponsor of ES Troyes AC.

On 3 August 2023, Winamax signed a sponsorship agreement with VfB Stuttgart. The contract was terminated early in 2025. VfB Stuttgart initiated legal action against Winamax, alleging that the company had suspended sponsorship payments.
