= 2023 Coupe de France final =

Football match between Nantes and Toulouse

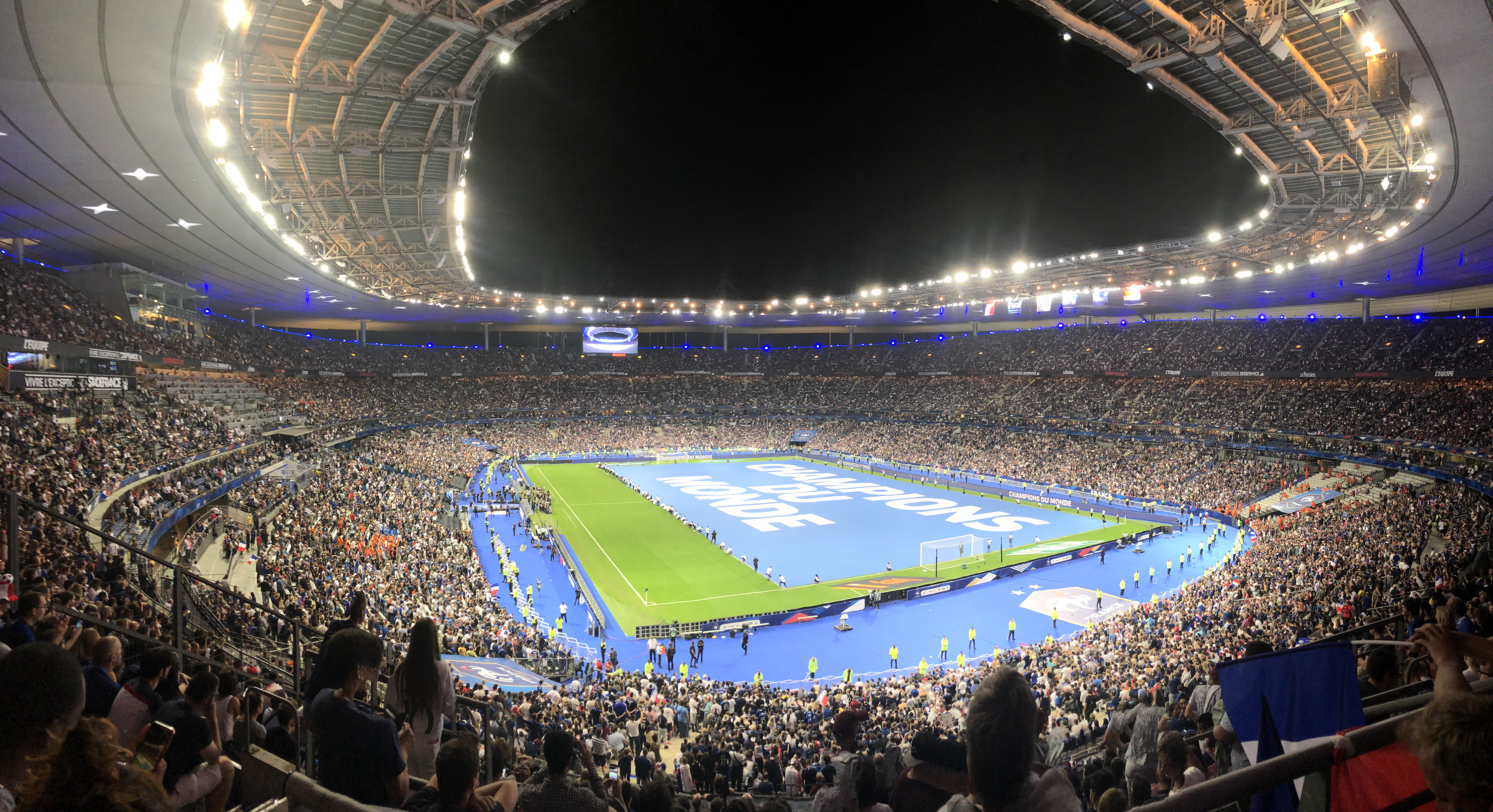
- The Stade de France hosted the final.
- Event: 2022–23 Coupe de France
Nantes	Toulouse
Ligue 1	Ligue 1
1	5
- Date: 29 April 2023
- Venue: Stade de France, Saint-Denis
- Referee: Benoît Millot
- Attendance: 78,038

The 2023 Coupe de France final was a football match between Nantes and Toulouse to decide the winner of the 2022–23 Coupe de France, the 106th season of the Coupe de France.

Toulouse won the match 5–1, claiming their first Coupe de France title. It was the city's second title, however, as the unaffiliated predecessor Toulouse FC, which was dissolved in 1967, had won the title back in 1957.

== Route to the final ==
Nantes		Round	Toulouse
Opponent	Result	2022–23 Coupe de France	Opponent	Result
AF Virois	2–0 (A)	Round of 64	Lannion FC	7–1 (A)
ES Thaon	0–0 (4–2 pen.) (A)	Round of 32	Ajaccio	2–0 (H)
Angers	1–1 (4–2 pen.) (A)	Round of 16	Reims	3–1 (H)
Lens	2–1 (H)	Quarter-finals	Rodez	6–1 (H)
Lyon	1–0 (H)	Semi-finals	Annecy	2–1 (A)

Note: H = home fixture, A = away fixture

== Match ==
=== Details ===
29 April 2023
21:00 CEST

Nantes	1–5	Toulouse
Blas 75' (pen.)	Report	Costa 4', 10'; Dallinga 23', 31'; Aboukhlal 79'

Stade de France, Saint-Denis
Attendance: 78,038
Referee: Benoît Millot

Nantes	Toulouse

GK	1	(France) Alban Lafont (c)
RB	28	(France) Fabien Centonze
CB	21	(Cameroon) Jean-Charles Castelletto
CB	4	(France) Nicolas Pallois	(yellow card) 38'	(substituted off) 46'
LB	38	(Brazil) João Victor	(yellow card) 26'	(substituted off) 66'
DM	3	(Brazil) Andrei Girotto
RM	10	(France) Ludovic Blas		(substituted off) 82'
CM	17	(France) Moussa Sissoko
CM	25	(France) Florent Mollet		(substituted off) 46'
LM	27	(Nigeria) Moses Simon		(substituted off) 46'
CF	31	(Egypt) Mostafa Mohamed
Substitutes:
GK	16	(France) Rémy Descamps	(yellow card) 43'
DF	24	(France) Sébastien Corchia
DF	26	(Algeria) Jaouen Hadjam
MF	8	(Democratic Republic of the Congo) Samuel Moutoussamy		(substituted on) 46'
MF	29	(France) Quentin Merlin		(substituted on) 66'
FW	7	(France) Evann Guessand
FW	11	(France) Marcus Coco		(substituted on) 82'
FW	14	(Cameroon) Ignatius Ganago		(substituted on) 46'
FW	99	(Algeria) Andy Delort		(substituted on) 46'
Manager:
(France) Antoine Kombouaré

GK	16	(Norway) Kjetil Haug
RB	3	(Denmark) Mikkel Desler	(yellow card) 88'
CB	14	(Cape Verde) Logan Costa		(substituted off) 82'
CB	2	(Denmark) Rasmus Nicolaisen
LB	15	(Chile) Gabriel Suazo
CM	17	(Netherlands) Stijn Spierings		(substituted off) 82'
CM	8	(Netherlands) Branco van den Boomen
RW	10	(Belgium) Brecht Dejaegere (c)	(yellow card) 58'	(substituted off) 69'
AM	6	(Morocco) Zakaria Aboukhlal
LW	28	(Algeria) Farès Chaïbi		(substituted off) 76'
CF	27	(Netherlands) Thijs Dallinga		(substituted off) 69'
Substitutes:
GK	30	(France) Maxime Dupé
DF	4	(France) Anthony Rouault		(substituted on) 82'
DF	23	(Mali) Moussa Diarra		(substituted on) 82'
DF	26	(Norway) Warren Kamanzi
MF	5	(Australia) Denis Genreau
MF	13	(Switzerland) Vincent Sierro		(substituted on) 69'
FW	7	(Japan) Ado Onaiwu		(substituted on) 69'
FW	21	(Brazil) Rafael Ratão		(substituted on) 76'
FW	29	(Bosnia and Herzegovina) Said Hamulić
Manager:
(France) Philippe Montanier

Assistant referees:
Matthieu Grobost
Hicham Zakrani
Fourth official:
Thomas Léonard
Video assistant referees:
Benoît Bastien
Alexandre Castro

Match rules

- 90 minutes
- 30 minutes of extra time if necessary
- Penalty shoot-out if scores still level
- Nine named substitutes
- Maximum of five substitutions, with a sixth allowed in extra time (Note: Each team was given only three opportunities to make substitutions, with a fourth opportunity in extra time, excluding substitutions made at half-time, before the start of extra time and at half-time in extra time.)
