= Damien Comolli =

French association football executive (born 1971)

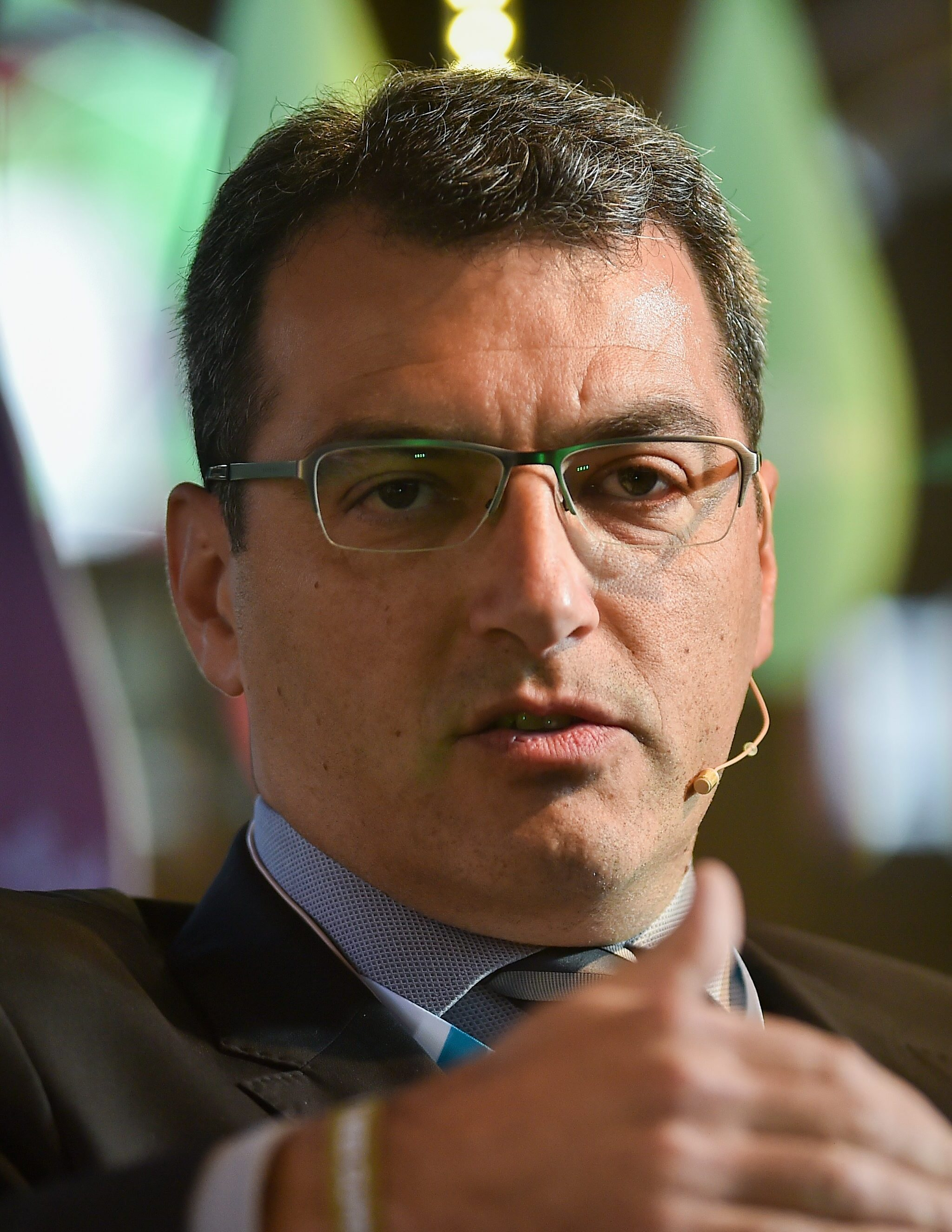
- Comolli in 2014

Personal information
- Full name: Damien Jacques Comolli
- Date of birth: 24 November 1971 (age 54)
- Place of birth: Béziers, France

Team information
- Current team: Juventus

Managerial career
- Years: Team
- 1992–1995: Monaco Academy (manager)
- 1996–2004: Arsenal (scout)
- 2004–2005: Saint-Étienne (sporting director)
- 2005–2008: Tottenham Hotspur (football director)
- 2008–2010: Saint-Étienne (sporting director)
- 2010–2012: Liverpool (sporting director)
- 2018–2020: Fenerbahçe (sporting director)
- 2020–2025: Toulouse (president)
- 2025–: Juventus (general manager)

Damien Jacques Comolli (born 24 November 1971) is a French football executive who was the general manager of Juventus. After training as a coach and managing Monaco's academy in the early 1990s, Comolli was appointed as a scout for Arsenal. He later worked as a sporting director for Saint-Étienne, Tottenham Hotspur, Liverpool, and Fenerbahçe, before acting as president as Toulouse from 2020 to 2025.

== Early life and career ==
Comolli was born in Béziers, France, on 24 November 1971. He is of Italian ancestry and holds Italian citizenship as a result, in addition to French citizenship. Comolli played as a youth team player at Monaco. In 1992, he began a three-year coaching job with Monaco, where he looked after the club's under-16 squads, and won the state championship at that level. It was during his time as youth coach that he met Arsène Wenger.

Comolli completed a law degree in 1995 and gained his French coaching licence. In 1996, Comolli joined Arsenal and spent seven seasons as a European scout, and is credited with the discovery of several of Arsenal's players, including Gaël Clichy, Emmanuel Eboué, Thierry Henry, and Kolo Touré. During his time at Arsenal, in addition to five Charity Shield/Community Shield and three FA Cup titles, the club won three Premier League titles, including the Invincibles 2003–04 season.

== Sporting director ==
=== Saint-Étienne first spell ===
Between 2004 and 2005, Comolli was technical director of Saint-Étienne. During his time there, he oversaw a number of important first team signings and developed partnerships with junior and amateur clubs, locally, nationally, and internationally. The club went through a successful period, finishing sixth in Ligue 1 and reaching the semi-finals of the Coupe de France in the 2004–05 season. Comolli left the club due to a fallout with the other directors.

=== Tottenham Hotspur ===
On 7 September 2005, Comolli became director of football at Tottenham Hotspur, with overall responsibility for the medical, academy, scouting, and club secretarial departments, replacing the outgoing Frank Arnesen. During his time there, Comolli had several disagreements with first-team head coach Martin Jol. After his departure from Spurs, Jol complained several players had been signed by Comolli without his agreement and that they had left the squad "unbalanced".

Comolli spent three years in the job, immediately qualifying for UEFA competitions, with a best place of fifth in the Premier League in the 2005–06 and 2006–07 seasons, plus the Football League Cup in the 2007–08 season, the club's first trophy since 1991 and the last one until the 2024–25 UEFA Europa League. With Tottenham performing poorly at the start of the 2008–09 season, and some of Comolli's signings coming in for criticism, he was dismissed in October 2008, shortly after the dismissals of manager Juande Ramos, assistant Gus Poyet, and first team coach Marcos Álvarez, as the director of football position was abolished at the insistence of incoming manager Harry Redknapp.

During his time at Tottenham, Comolli was responsible for Tottenham's policy of signing young talents. Comolli was also responsible for the signings of former Tottenham first-team squad members Benoît Assou-Ekotto, Gareth Bale (multiple Ballon d'Or nominations), Darren Bent, David Bentley, Dimitar Berbatov, Vedran Ćorluka, Heurelho Gomes, Mido, Luka Modric (a future Ballon d'Or winner), Roman Pavlyuchenko, Grzegorz Rasiak, Ricardo Rocha, Giovani dos Santos, Jonathan Woodgate, and Didier Zokora.

=== Saint-Étienne second spell ===
On 9 November 2008, it was announced that Comolli would return to Saint-Étienne as sporting director. His appointment led to the departure of coach Laurent Roussey a day later, after the club suffered five straight league losses. Comolli's second spell at Saint-Étienne was less successful. In the 2008–09 season, the club reached the round of 16 in the 2008–09 UEFA Cup but only finished seventeenth in Ligue 1, narrowly avoiding relegation, a feat repeated in the 2009–10 season; however, before his departure at the start of the 2010–11 season, the club was fourth in Ligue 1. After leaving Saint-Étienne for Liverpool, the club's co-chairman Bernard Caiazzo said that Comolli was responsible for causing the club's financial problem and told the News of the World that "Damien spent €22 million [£18.7 million] of our money on seven players in summer of last year. Only one is a first-team regular now. We gave him the keys to our club and are now in financial difficulties. My own view of Damien is he favours size and strength as the qualities he goes for first. Perhaps, he will do better with more money at his disposal at Liverpool than he did with us."

=== Liverpool ===
On 3 November 2010, Comolli's appointment as director of football strategy at Liverpool was announced, with part of his remit being to oversee the recruitment of new players to the club. When he arrived at Liverpool, the club had finished seventh in the latest Premier League, meaning it missed out on a place in the UEFA Champions League for the first time since 2003, and the club was debt-ridden, having been just bought out in October 2010 by New England Sports Ventures for £300 million. Roy Hodgson, the then manager, had complained that the team inherited by his predecessor Rafael Benítez lacked quality. Comolli made an instant impact at Liverpool as he was responsible for the signings of two players, Andy Carroll and Luis Suárez, in January 2011's transfer deadline day, with Carroll's signing breaking the record for most expensive British player ever. On 22 March 2011, Comolli was appointed as the director of football at Liverpool.

After finishing sixth and thus out of UEFA competitions in the 2010–11 season, the summer transfer window for the 2011–12 season saw Comolli signing Charlie Adam, Craig Bellamy, Sebastián Coates, Doni, Stewart Downing, José Enrique, Jordan Henderson, Jordon Ibe, and Danny Ward. On 12 April 2012, Comolli left Liverpool by mutual consent. The club had won the Football League Cup in February 2012, but were only eighth in the Premier League, despite the many millions spent. After leaving Liverpool, Comolli spoke out and defended the club's record, while expressing some regrets about not being open enough with the media and fans about his successes and strategy.

=== Fenerbahçe ===
On 12 June 2018, Comolli was appointed as director of football at Fenerbahçe. The study of statistics in player selection was introduced under Comolli, and a collection of data and individual characteristics was used to determine the most suitable players based on the needs of the coach and staff. Comolli made an instant impact at Fenerbahçe as he was responsible for several notable signings, including those of André Ayew, Victor Moses, and Islam Slimani for the 2018–19 season; however, Fenerbahçe were second bottom halfway through the season and only finished sixth, which was their lowest position in three decades.

Comolli signed with Luiz Gustavo, Max Kruse, and Vedat Muriqi for the 2019–20 season, where the club further fell back to seventh despite reaching the semi-finals of the Turkish Cup,and Papiss Cissé, İrfan Can Kahveci, Mesut Özil, José Sosa, Enner Valencia, and İsmail Yüksek for the 2020–21 season, where Fenerbahçe rebounded to third place. Comolli also played a leading role in the transfers of Giuliano de Paula to Al Nassr (€10,5 million), Josef de Souza to Al-Ahli (€12 million), Eljif Elmas to Napoli (€16 million plus bonuses), and Vedat Muriqi to Lazio (€17 million plus bonuses). On 16 January 2020, Comolli left Fenerbahçe by mutual consent. Comolli was self-admittedly sidelined in the decision making process at Fenerbahçe, at the very least beginning with the January transfer window on 2020.

== Executive ==
=== Toulouse ===
Comolli joined Toulouse following RedBird Capital's purchase of a controlling stake in the club on 20 July 2020. According to reports from multiple Italian outlets, Billy Beane had recommended his appointment to Toulouse's ownership group. In the 2020–21 season, the club's first season in the second division of French football in seventeen years, Toulouse finished third in the league and lost to Nantes the playoff final, which saw Comolli banned for four matches due to criticising the referee for not issuing a penalty kick for Toulouse. In the 2021–22 season, Toulouse returned to the top tier of French football by winning Ligue 2. In the 2022–23 season, Toulouse finished thirteen and avoided relegation, which was the club's main objective, and won its first ever Coupe de France against Nantes.

In the following seasons, Toulouse exceeded expectations, for example beating Liverpool in the 2023–24 UEFA Europa League group stage, and remained in Ligue 1, finishing eleventh while losing out the Trophée des Champions to Paris Saint-Germain in the 2023–24 season, and finishing tenth in the 2024–25 season, Comolli's final season. Key players included Rhys Healey, Rasmus Nicolaisen, Stijn Spierings, Gabriel Suazo, Issiaga Sylla (the only football player who was a significant part of the club during both Ligue 2 and Ligue 1 seasons), and Branco van den Boomen, and Toulouse under Comolli consolidated their place in Ligue 1.

With the help of Philippe Montanier, the former Nottingham Forest coach, Comolli is credited for revolutionising the club's identity. Toulouse under Comolli developed one of the best French youth academies, including the likes of Farès Chaïbi and Anthony Rouault. Toulouse under Comolli also became known for its use of statistical analysis inspired by sabermetrics (an approach known as Moneyball), which he had also relied on during his time at Liverpool, in recruiting and managing players. According to Comolli, Toulouse "makes all decisions on the basis of data and statistics". On 28 May 2025, he announced on X (formerly Twitter) that he was leaving Toulouse, with circulating reports linking him to Juventus, after the year prior he had been linked to RedBird's Milan. He was succeeded by former Rennes president Olivier Cloarec.

=== Juventus ===
As part of a structural reorganisation of the club's senior management following Francesco Calvo's resignation, Comolli joined Juventus as the new general manager on 1 June 2025. He was to respond directly to CEO Maurizio Scanavino and be responsible for overseeing the football side of the men's team and the marketing and commercial departments. In his first press conference as general manager, Comolli said that "it is a privilege to be the General Manager of one of the world's biggest clubs", and that he "grew up watching this club for various reasons, and I've been attracted to the winning organisations. Juve have always been a model. I used to go to the Delle Alpi as a scout, and I appreciate Juventus' culture."

In his role as general manager for the 2025–26 season, Comolli confirmed the appointment of Igor Tudor, having met him as a coach of Marseille and remembered "the physical intensity and the commitment of his team, it was really impressive." He also split the positions of technical and sporting directors after the departure of Cristiano Giuntoli as technical director, with Giorgio Chiellini appointed Director of Football Strategy, while François Modesto was appointed as the new technical director. In his first month as general manager, Comolli positively compared Juventus to his time at Liverpool, and oversaw the signing of Jonathan David, Francisco Conceição, and João Mário. On 7 October 2025, the club announced that Scanavino would step down effective 7 November 2025, marking the end of a three-year tenure. Juventus stated that it expected to promote Comolli to the position of CEO, succeeding Scanavino, while Chiellini was not expected to join the board.
