= 2022–23 Toulouse FC season =

Toulouse FC
2022–23 season
- President: Damien Comolli
- Head coach: Philippe Montanier
- Stadium: Stadium de Toulouse
- Ligue 1: 13th
- Coupe de France: Winners
- Top goalscorer: League: Thijs Dallinga (12); All: Thijs Dallinga (18)
- Biggest win: Lannion FC 1–7 Toulouse
- Biggest defeat: Marseille 6–1 Toulouse
Home colours	Away colours

The 2022–23 season was the 53rd season in the existence of Toulouse FC and the club's first season back in the top flight of French football. In addition to the domestic league, Toulouse participated in this season's edition of the Coupe de France, winning the competition for a first ever top-flight title. The season covers the period from 1 July 2022 to 30 June 2023.

== Players ==
=== First-team squad ===
As of 31 January 2023.

Note: Flags indicate national team as defined under FIFA eligibility rules; some limited exceptions apply. Players may hold more than one non-FIFA nationality.

No.	Pos.	Nation	Player
1	GK	FRA	Thomas Himeur
2	DF	DEN	Rasmus Nicolaisen
3	DF	DEN	Mikkel Desler
4	DF	FRA	Anthony Rouault
5	MF	AUS	Denis Genreau
6	MF	MAR	Zakaria Aboukhlal
7	FW	JPN	Ado Onaiwu
8	MF	NED	Branco van den Boomen
9	FW	ENG	Rhys Healey
10	MF	BEL	Brecht Dejaegere (captain)
13	MF	SUI	Vincent Sierro
14	DF	CPV	Logan Costa
15	DF	CHI	Gabriel Suazo
16	GK	NOR	Kjetil Haug

No.	Pos.	Nation	Player
17	MF	NED	Stijn Spierings
18	DF	SWE	Oliver Zandén
19	MF	SRB	Veljko Birmančević
21	FW	BRA	Rafael Ratão
23	DF	MLI	Moussa Diarra
26	DF	NOR	Warren Kamanzi
27	FW	NED	Thijs Dallinga
28	MF	ALG	Farès Chaïbi
29	FW	BIH	Said Hamulić
30	GK	FRA	Maxime Dupé
31	DF	CMR	Kévin Keben
32	DF	FRA	Christian Mawissa
50	GK	FRA	Guillaume Restes
—	MF	ESP	César Gelabert

=== Out on loan ===
Note: Flags indicate national team as defined under FIFA eligibility rules; some limited exceptions apply. Players may hold more than one non-FIFA nationality.

No.	Pos.	Nation	Player
—	MF	BFA	Mamady Bangré (at Quevilly-Rouen until 30 June 2023)
—	MF	FRA	Sam Sanna (at Laval until 30 June 2023)
—	MF	FRA	Kléri Serber (at Botev Vratsa until 30 June 2023)
—	MF	FRA	Tom Rapnouil (at Botev Vratsa until 30 June 2023)

No.	Pos.	Nation	Player
—	MF	FIN	Naatan Skyttä (at Odense until 30 June 2023)
—	FW	MAR	Yanis Begraoui (at Pau until 30 June 2023)
—	FW	JAM	Junior Flemmings (at Niort until 30 June 2023)

== Pre-season and friendlies ==
Win Draw Loss Fixtures

2 July 2022 Friendly	Toulouse	2–0	Nîmes	Béziers
18:00 CEST (UTC+2)	Ratão 42'; Chaïbi 48'			Stadium: Stade de Sauclières; Attendance: 500; Referee: Abdelatif Kherradji

9 July 2022 Friendly	Toulouse	6–1	Troyes	Tulle
18:00 CEST (UTC+2)	Ratão 3'; Begraoui 36'; Dejaegere 45+1'; Chaïbi 49'; Mazou-Sacko 51' (o.g.); Sidibé 90'		Ilić 44' (pen.)	Stadium: Stade Alexandre Cueille; Attendance: 1,000; Referee: Jérémy Stinat

12 July 2022 Friendly	Toulouse	2–0	Pau	Tarbes
18:00 CEST (UTC+2)	Ratão 45'; Ruiz 86' (o.g.)			Stadium: Stade Maurice-Trélut; Attendance: 900; Referee: Azzedine Souifi

16 July 2022 Friendly	Real Sociedad	0–1	Toulouse	San Sebastián, Spain
19:00 CEST (UTC+2)			Aboukhlal 76'	Stadium: Estadio Zubieta XXI; Attendance: 5,014; Referee: Daniel Palencia Caballero (Spain)

19 July 2022 Friendly	Osasuna	3–3	Toulouse	Aranguren, Spain
18:30 CEST (UTC+2)	Ávila 21'; Kike 85' (pen.); Barbero 90+2'		Chaïbi 11'; Ngoumou 36'; Skyttä 77'	Stadium: Tajonar Facilities; Attendance: 1,300; Referee: David Recio

23 July 2022 Friendly	Montpellier	4–5	Toulouse	Agde
19:00 CEST (UTC+2)	Wahi 36' (pen.); Khazri 44'; Nordin 45'; Mavididi 62' (pen.)		Dallinga 10'; Ratão 19'; Ngoumou 30'; Nicolaisen 53'; Diarra 83'	Stadium: Stade Louis Sanguin; Attendance: 1,000; Referee: Gaël Angoula
Note: Match was played in three 45-minute periods.

30 July 2022 Friendly	Toulouse	0–1	Clermont	Aurillac
18:00 CEST (UTC+2)	Nicolaisen (yellow card) 77'	Report	Gastien 75'	Stadium: Stade de Baradel; Attendance: 1,600
Note: Match was played in two 90-minute periods.

23 September 2022 Friendly	Toulouse	2–1	Nîmes	Toulouse
11:30 CEST (UTC+2)	Flemmings 61'; Zodehougan 67', (yellow card) 71'	Report	Pagis 6'; Vargas (yellow card) 70'	Stadium: Annexe 1 du Stadium; Attendance: 0 Referee: Souiffi

13 December 2022 Friendly	İstanbul Başakşehir	2–2	Toulouse	Belek, Turkey
16:00 TRT (UTC+3)	Kény 28'; Türüç 78' (pen.)		Chaïbi 30' (pen.); Van den Boomen 38'	Stadium: Maxx Royal Hotel Field A

16 December 2022 Friendly	Galatasaray	2–1	Toulouse	Aksu, Turkey
17:00 TRT (UTC+3)	Gomis 45+4' (pen.); Mertens 60'	Report	Nicolaisen 42'	Stadium: Mardan Sports Complex

20 December 2022 Friendly	Montpellier	2–1	Toulouse	Montpellier
16:15 CET (UTC+1)	Sakho 110'; Germain 117'		Van den Boomen 89'	Attendance: 0
Note: Match was played in three 45-minute periods

== Competitions ==
=== Overall record ===
Competition	First match	Last match	Starting round	Final position	Record							
Competition	First match	Last match	Starting round	Final position	Pld	W	D	L	GF	GA	GD	Win %
Ligue 1	7 August 2022	3 June 2023	Matchday 1	13th	38	13	9	16	51	57	−6	34.21
Coupe de France	8 January 2023	29 April 2023	Round of 64	Winners	6	6	0	0	25	5	+20	100.00
Total					44	19	9	16	76	62	+14	43.18

Source: Soccerway

=== Ligue 1 ===
==== League table ====
Pos	Team	Pld	W	D	L	GF	GA	GD	Pts	Qualification or relegation
11	Reims	38	12	15	11	45	45	0	51	
12	Montpellier	38	15	5	18	65	62	+3	50	
13	Toulouse	38	13	9	16	51	57	−6	48	Qualification for the Europa League group stage (Note: Toulouse qualified for the Europa League group stage as the 2022–23 Coupe de France winners.)
14	Brest	38	11	11	16	44	54	−10	44	
15	Strasbourg	38	9	13	16	51	59	−8	40	

Source: Ligue 1
Rules for classification: 1) Points; 2) Goal difference; 3) Head-to-head points; 4) Head-to-head goal difference; 5) Head-to-head goals scored; 6) Head-to-head away goals scored; 7) Goals scored; 8) Away goals scored; 9) Fair-play points (Note: Head-to-head record is used only after all the matches between the teams in question have been played).

==== Results summary ====
Overall								Home						Away					
Pld	W	D	L	GF	GA	GD	Pts	W	D	L	GF	GA	GD	W	D	L	GF	GA	GD
38	13	9	16	51	57	−6	48	6	6	7	27	27	0	7	3	9	24	30	−6

Source: Ligue 1

==== Results by round ====
Round	1	2	3	4	5	6	7	8	9	10	11	12	13	14	15	16	17	18	19	20	21	22	23	24	25	26	27	28	29	30	31	32	33	34	35	36	37	38
Ground	H	A	H	A	H	A	H	A	H	A	H	H	A	H	A	A	H	A	H	A	H	A	H	H	A	H	A	H	A	A	H	A	H	A	H	A	H	A
Result	D	W	D	L	L	L	W	L	W	D	W	D	L	L	L	L	W	W	D	W	W	L	W	L	L	L	W	L	L	W	L	W	L	D	D	D	D	W
Position	10	4	6	10	13	15	11	12	12	11	9	10	11	12	12	13	12	12	12	12	12	12	11	11	11	12	11	12	13	12	12	12	13	13	13	13	13	13

Source: Ligue 1
A = Away; H = Home; W = Win; D = Draw; L = Loss

==== Matches ====
The league fixtures were announced on 17 June 2022.

7 August 2022 1	Toulouse	1–1	Nice	Toulouse
13:00 CEST (UTC+2)	Dallinga 20'; Keben (yellow card) 86'	Report	Rosario (yellow card) 63'; Dante (yellow card) 65'; Ramsey 78'	Stadium: Stadium de Toulouse; Attendance: 20,567; Referee: Johan Hamel

14 August 2022 2	Troyes	0–3	Toulouse	Troyes
15:00 CEST (UTC+2)	Kouamé (yellow card) 42'; Tardieu (yellow card) 74'	Report	Dallinga (yellow card) 30'; Larouci 36' (o.g.); Ratão 54'; Healey 85'	Stadium: Stade de l'Aube; Attendance: 7,630; Referee: Marc Bollengier

21 August 2022 3	Toulouse	2–2	Lorient	Toulouse
15:00 CEST (UTC+2)	Ratão 31'; Dallinga (yellow card) 43', (goal) 64'; Van den Boomen (yellow card) 72'	Report	Laurienté 2'; Le Fée (yellow card) 22'; Koné 80' (pen.)	Stadium: Stadium de Toulouse; Attendance: 23,862; Referee: Gustavo Correia

28 August 2022 4	Nantes	3–1	Toulouse	Nantes
13:00 CEST (UTC+2)	Guessand 50'; Mohamed 56'; Simon 61'	Report	Aboukhlal 15'; Van den Boomen (yellow card) 36'; Dejaegere (yellow card) 45'; Nicolaisen (yellow card) 87'	Stadium: Stade de la Beaujoire; Attendance: 26,574; Referee: Mathieu Vernice

31 August 2022 5	Toulouse	0–3	Paris Saint-Germain	Toulouse
21:00 CEST (UTC+2)	Ratão (yellow card) 64'	Report	Neymar 37'; Mbappé 50'; Bernat 90'	Stadium: Stadium de Toulouse; Attendance: 33,150; Referee: Hakim Ben El Hadj

4 September 2022 6	Clermont	2–0	Toulouse	Clermont-Ferrand
15:00 CEST (UTC+2)	Kyei (yellow card) 15'; Wieteska (yellow card) 23'; Gonalons 46'; Gastien (yellow card) 66'; Seidu (yellow card) 75'; Cham 90+6'	Report	Sylla (yellow card) 63'	Stadium: Stade Gabriel Montpied; Attendance: 10,085; Referee: François Letexier

11 September 2022 7	Toulouse	1–0	Reims	Toulouse
15:00 CEST (UTC+2)	Aboukhlal 31'; Spierings (yellow card) 56'; Genreau (yellow card) 86'	Report	Flips (red card) 61'; Lopy (yellow card) 73'; Abdelhamid (yellow card) 90'	Stadium: Stadium de Toulouse; Attendance: 21,315; Referee: Stéphanie Frappart

17 September 2022 8	Lille	2–1	Toulouse	Villeneuve-d'Ascq
21:00 CEST (UTC+2)	David 5'; Fonte (yellow card) 44'; Ounas 53'; Diakité (yellow card) 73'	Report	Chaïbi 48'	Stadium: Stade Pierre-Mauroy; Attendance: 33,635; Referee: Pierre Gaillouste

2 October 2022 9	Toulouse	4–2	Montpellier	Toulouse
15:00 CEST (UTC+2)	Desler (yellow card) 15' (yellow-red card) 60'; Spierings 18', (yellow card) 60'; Aboukhlal 24'; Chaïbi 31'; Sylla (yellow card) 43'; Dejaegere 48'; Genreau (yellow card) 73'	Report	Cozza 7'; Ferri (yellow card) 16'; Chotard (yellow card) 33'; Savanier (yellow card) 53'; Wahi (yellow card) 67', (goal) 68'	Stadium: Stadium de Toulouse; Attendance: 21,820; Referee: Jérémie Pignard

7 October 2022 10	Lyon	1–1	Toulouse	Décines-Charpieu
21:00 CEST (UTC+2)	Tetê 2'; Toko Ekambi (yellow card) 88'; Cherki (yellow card) 90+1'	Report	Dallinga (yellow card) 4'; Aboukhlal (yellow card) 30'; Ratão 67'	Stadium: Groupama Stadium; Attendance: 41,295; Referee: Ruddy Buquet

16 October 2022 11	Toulouse	3–2	Angers	Toulouse
13:00 CEST (UTC+2)	Dejaegere 10'; Nicolaisen (yellow card) 31'; Van den Boomen 40' (pen.); Aboukhlal (yellow card) 48'; Spierings 67'; Chaïbi (yellow card) 73'	Report	Doumbia (yellow card) 21'; Bentaleb 33'; Amadou (yellow card) 76'; Salama 90+3'	Stadium: Stadium de Toulouse; Attendance: 21,141; Referee: Benoît Bastien

23 October 2022 12	Toulouse	2–2	Strasbourg	Toulouse
15:00 CEST (UTC+2)	Nicolaisen (yellow card) 40' (yellow-red card) 71'; Rouault 44'; Dejaegere 55'	Report	Liénard (yellow card) 31'; Mothiba 65'; Gameiro (penalty missed) 73', 73'	Stadium: Stadium de Toulouse; Attendance: 21,622; Referee: Jérémy Stinat

28 October 2022 13	Lens	3–0	Toulouse	Lens
21:00 CEST (UTC+2)	Fofana (penalty missed) 49'; Openda 60', 86', 90+2', (yellow card) 90+3'; Haïdara (yellow card) 67'	Report	Dejaegere (yellow card) 80'	Stadium: Stade Bollaert-Delelis; Attendance: 37,488; Referee: Florent Batta

6 November 2022 14	Toulouse	0–2	Monaco	Toulouse
15:00 CET (UTC+1)		Report	Golovin 46'; Embolo 60'; Akliouche (yellow card) 90+2'	Stadium: Stadium de Toulouse; Attendance: 23,005; Referee: Benoît Millot

12 November 2022 15	Rennes	2–1	Toulouse	Rennes
21:00 CET (UTC+1)	Bourigeaud 25'; Kalimuendo 58'	Report	Dallinga 55'	Stadium: Roazhon Park; Attendance: 26,835; Referee: Willy Delajod

29 December 2022 16	Marseille	6–1	Toulouse	Marseille
21:00 CET (UTC+1)	Rongier 12'; Nicolaisen 40' (o.g.); Kolašinac 51'; Payet 61'; Clauss (yellow card) 64'; Ünder 79' (pen.); Tavares 81'	Report	Van den Boomen 65' (pen.), (yellow card) 81'; Mawissa (yellow card) 78'	Stadium: Stade Vélodrome; Attendance: 62,556; Referee: Jérémie Pignard

1 January 2023 17	Toulouse	2–0	Ajaccio	Toulouse
15:00 CET (UTC+1)	Van den Boomen (yellow card) 37'; Ratão 46'; Dejaegere (yellow card) 56', (goal) 62'; Dallinga (yellow card) 90+3'	Report	Moussiti-Oko (yellow card) 78'	Stadium: Stadium de Toulouse; Attendance: 25,957; Referee: Pierre Gaillouste

11 January 2023 18	Auxerre	0–5	Toulouse	Auxerre
19:00 CET (UTC+1)	Niang (yellow card) 43'; Mensah (yellow card) 55'; Jubal (yellow card) 88'	Report	Chaïbi 4'; Rouault 33'; Van den Boomen 41' (pen.); Sylla (yellow card) 44'; Aboukhlal 75'; Dallinga 88'	Stadium: Stade de l'Abbé-Deschamps; Attendance: 12,405; Referee: Florent Batta

15 January 2023 19	Toulouse	1–1	Brest	Toulouse
15:00 CET (UTC+1)	Dejaegere (yellow card) 42'; Rouault (yellow card) 57'; Aboukhlal 65'	Report	Mounié 18'; Brassier (yellow card) 37'; Lees-Melou (yellow card) 38'	Stadium: Stadium de Toulouse; Attendance: 20,637; Referee: Benoît Millot

29 January 2023 20	Strasbourg	1–2	Toulouse	Strasbourg
15:00 CET (UTC+1)	Gameiro 20', (red card) 90+3'; Doukouré (yellow card) 47'	Report	Dallinga 25', 51'; Aboukhlal (yellow card) 74'	Stadium: Stade de la Meinau; Attendance: 25,196; Referee: Willy Delajod

1 February 2023 21	Toulouse	4–1	Troyes	Toulouse
19:00 CET (UTC+1)	Dupé (yellow card) 9'; Dallinga 15'; Rouault (yellow card) 26'; Chaïbi 35'; Van den Boomen 54' (pen.); Onaiwu 87'	Report	M. Baldé 11' (pen.), 51'; Agoumé (yellow card) 41'; Salmier (yellow card) 44'; Porozo (yellow card) 73'	Stadium: Stadium de Toulouse; Attendance: 17,725; Referee: Mathieu Vernice

4 February 2023 22	Paris Saint-Germain	2–1	Toulouse	Paris
17:00 CET (UTC+1)	Bitshiabu (yellow card) 18'; Hakimi 38'; Mendes (yellow card) 45+2'; Messi 58'	Report	Van den Boomen 20'; Dejaegere (yellow card) 49'; Chaïbi (yellow card) 75'	Stadium: Parc des Princes; Attendance: 45,000; Referee: Bastien Dechepy

12 February 2023 23	Toulouse	3–1	Rennes	Toulouse
13:00 CET (UTC+1)	Desler (yellow card) 19'; Ratão 27'; Aboukhlal 28'; Dallinga 37'	Report	Rouault 55' (o.g.); Gouiri (yellow card) 90+1'	Stadium: Stadium de Toulouse; Attendance: 21,783; Referee: Jérémy Stinat

19 February 2023 24	Toulouse	2–3	Marseille	Toulouse
20:45 CET (UTC+1)	Dallinga 3'; Onaiwu 87'	Report	Mbemba 52'; Ünder (yellow card) 54', (goal) 59'; Kolašinac (yellow card) 76'; Tavares 78'	Stadium: Stadium de Toulouse; Attendance: 29,218; Referee: Stéphanie Frappart

26 February 2023 25	Reims	3–0	Toulouse	Reims
15:00 CET (UTC+1)	Ito 4'; Munetsi 7'; Abdelhamid 68'	Report		Stadium: Stade Auguste Delaune; Attendance: 12,139; Referee: Mathieu Vernice

5 March 2023 26	Toulouse	0–1	Clermont	Toulouse
15:00 CET (UTC+1)	Nicolaisen (yellow card) 38'; Desler (yellow card) 40'; Van den Boomen (yellow card) 81'; Hamulic (yellow card) 88'	Report	Ogier (yellow card) 43'; Khaoui 76'	Stadium: Stadium de Toulouse; Attendance: 20,620; Referee: Florent Batta

12 March 2023 27	Angers	0–2	Toulouse	Angers
15:00 CET (UTC+1)		Report	Ratão (yellow card) 32'; Desler 37'; Dallinga 46'	Stadium: Stade Raymond Kopa; Attendance: 6,487; Referee: Pierre Gaillouste

18 March 2023 28	Toulouse	0–2	Lille	Toulouse
17:00 CET (UTC+1)	Nicolaisen (yellow card) 85'; Sierro (yellow card) 90+1'	Report	Alexsandro 85'; Bayo 90+11'	Stadium: Stadium de Toulouse; Attendance: 23,006; Referee: Hakim Ben El Hadj

2 April 2023 29	Brest	3–1	Toulouse	Brest
15:00 CEST (UTC+2)	Lala (yellow card) 4'; Lees-Melou (yellow card) 30'; Mounié 33'; Le Douaron 63'; Camara 84'	Report	Dallinga 10'; Desler (yellow card) 25'; Spierings (yellow card) 30'; Aboukhlal (yellow card) 60'; Rouault (yellow card) 75' (yellow-red card) 83'	Stadium: Stade Francis-Le Blé; Attendance: 12,325; Referee: Stéphanie Frappart

9 April 2023 29	Montpellier	1–2	Toulouse	Montpellier
15:00 CEST (UTC+2)	Wahi 88'	Report	Dallinga 31'; Genreau (yellow card) 58'; Van den Boomen (yellow card) 70'; Chaïbi 85'	Stadium: Stade de la Mosson; Attendance: 17,283; Referee: Florent Batta

14 April 2023 31	Toulouse	1–2	Lyon	Toulouse
21:00 CEST (UTC+2)	Aboukhlal 37'; Suazo (yellow card) 54'	Report	Jeffinho (yellow card) 15'; Kumbedi (yellow card) 25'; Lacazette 34' (pen.), (yellow card) 87'; Costa 88' (o.g.); Mendes (yellow card) 90+1'	Stadium: Stadium de Toulouse; Attendance: 28,302; Referee: François Letexier

23 April 2023 32	Lorient	0–1	Toulouse	Lorient
15:00 CEST (UTC+2)	Abergel (yellow card) 70'; Meïté (yellow card) 78'; Kalulu (yellow card) 82'	Report	Sierro (yellow card) 51'; Aboukhlal 68'; Spierings (yellow card) 90+1'	Stadium: Stade du Moustoir; Attendance: 15,948; Referee: Marc Bollengier

2 May 2023 33	Toulouse	0–1	Lens	Toulouse
21:00 CEST (UTC+2)	Kamanzi (yellow card) 77'	Report	Openda 32'; Frankowski (yellow card) 59'; Samba (yellow card) 83'	Stadium: Stadium de Toulouse; Attendance: 30,866; Referee: Bastien Dechepy

7 May 2023 34	Ajaccio	0–0	Toulouse	Ajaccio
15:00 CEST (UTC+2)	Gonzalez (yellow card) 49'; Mangani (yellow card) 64'; Marchetti (yellow card) 69'	Report		Stadium: Stade François Coty; Attendance: 6,735; Referee: Florent Batta

14 May 2023 35	Toulouse	0–0	Nantes	Toulouse
15:00 CEST (UTC+2)	Desler (yellow card) 90+2'	Report	Girotto (yellow card) 58'	Stadium: Stadium de Toulouse; Attendance: 27,033; Referee: Jérôme Brisard

21 May 2023 36	Nice	0–0	Toulouse	Nice
15:00 CEST (UTC+2)	Beka Beka (yellow card) 32'; Moffi (yellow card) 72'	Report	Nicolaisen (yellow card) 23'; Spierings (yellow card) 90+3'	Stadium: Allianz Riviera; Attendance: 20,041; Referee: Jérémie Pignard

27 May 2023 37	Toulouse	1–1	Auxerre	Toulouse
21:00 CEST (UTC+2)	Aboukhlal 44'; Spierings (yellow card) 71'	Report	Massengo (yellow card) 18'; Raveloson 24'; Abline (yellow card) 84'	Stadium: Stadium de Toulouse; Attendance: 25,172; Referee: Mathieu Vernice

3 June 2023 38	Monaco	1–2	Toulouse	Monaco
21:00 CEST (UTC+2)	Aguilar (yellow card) 12'; Ben Yedder 78'	Report	Sierro (yellow card) 58'; Aboukhlal 70'; Healey 90+4', (yellow card) 90+5'	Stadium: Stade Louis II; Attendance: 5,670; Referee: Stéphanie Frappart

=== Coupe de France ===
8 January 2023 Round of 64	Lannion FC	1–7	Toulouse	Guingamp
18:00 CET (UTC+1)	Haug 36' (o.g.)	Report	Skyttä 12'; Begraoui 32'; Dallinga 39', 75'; Birmančević 57'; Boisvilliers 66' (o.g.); Spierings 81'; Van den Boomen (yellow card) 85'	Stadium: Stade de Roudourou; Attendance: 6,300; Referee: Ruddy Buquet

21 January 2023 Round of 32	Toulouse	2–0	Ajaccio	Toulouse
18:00 CET (UTC+1)	Sylla (yellow card) 32'; Aboukhlal 66'; Ratão 69'	Report	Gonzalez (yellow card) 8'	Stadium: Stadium de Toulouse; Attendance: 18,708; Referee: François Letexier

8 February 2023 Round of 16	Toulouse	3–1	Reims	Toulouse
18:15 CET (UTC+1)	Diouf 23' (o.g.); Aboukhlal 35', (yellow card) 54'; Chaïbi 62'; Spierings (yellow card) 70'	Report	Lopy (yellow card) 7'; Busi (yellow card) 51'; Cajuste 89'	Stadium: Stadium de Toulouse; Attendance: 17,660; Referee: Willy Delajod

1 March 2023 Quarter-finals	Toulouse	6–1	Rodez	Toulouse
18:45 CET (UTC+1)	Aboukhlal 5'; Van den Boomen 7'; Dallinga 10', 51' (pen.); Chaïbi 21'; Suazo 38'	Report	Raux-Yao (yellow card) 20'; Younoussa 69'	Stadium: Stadium de Toulouse; Attendance: 30,480; Referee: Jérémie Pignard

6 April 2023 Semi-finals	Annecy	1–2	Toulouse	Annecy
20:45 CEST (UTC+2)	Temanfo (yellow card) 25'; Bosetti (yellow card) 45+5', (goal) 51' (pen.)	Report	Aboukhlal 36'; Van den Boomen (yellow card) 56'; Chaïbi 85'	Stadium: Parc des Sports; Attendance: 13,620; Referee: Jérémy Stinat

29 April 2023 Final	Nantes	1–5	Toulouse	Saint-Denis
21:00 CEST (UTC+2)	João Victor (yellow card) 26'; Pallois (yellow card) 38'; Descamps (yellow card) 43'; Blas 75' (pen.)	Report	Costa 4', 10'; Dallinga 23', 31'; Dejaegere (yellow card) 58'; Aboukhlal 79'; Desler (yellow card) 88'	Stadium: Stade de France; Attendance: 78,038; Referee: Benoît Millot

== Statistics ==
=== Appearances and goals ===
As of 3 June 2023

No.	Pos	Nat	Player	Total		Ligue 1		Coupe de France	
No.	Pos	Nat	Player	Apps	Goals	Apps	Goals	Apps	Goals
Goalkeepers
1	GK	(France) FRA	Thomas Himeur	0	0	0	0	0	0
16	GK	(Norway) NOR	Kjetil Haug	6	0	0	0	6	0
30	GK	(France) FRA	Maxime Dupé	38	0	38	0	0	0
Defenders
2	DF	(Denmark) DEN	Rasmus Nicolaisen	39	0	34	0	5	0
3	DF	(Denmark) DEN	Mikkel Desler	31	1	26+1	1	4	0
4	DF	(France) FRA	Anthony Rouault	40	2	37	2	1+2	0
12	DF	(Guinea) GUI	Issiaga Sylla	18	0	16+1	0	1	0
14	DF	(France) FRA	Logan Costa	12	2	4+2	0	6	2
15	DF	(Chile) CHI	Gabriel Suazo	22	1	14+4	0	4	1
18	DF	(Sweden) SWE	Oliver Zandén	6	0	1+4	0	1	0
23	DF	(Mali) MLI	Moussa Diarra	25	0	12+11	0	0+2	0
26	DF	(Norway) NOR	Warren Kamanzi	15	0	7+4	0	2+2	0
31	DF	(Cameroon) CMR	Kévin Keben	11	0	4+7	0	0	0
32	DF	(France) FRA	Christian Mawissa	3	0	1+1	0	0+1	0
Midfielders
5	MF	(Australia) AUS	Denis Genreau	20	0	7+13	0	0	0
8	MF	(Netherlands) NED	Branco van den Boomen	40	6	32+3	5	4+1	1
10	MF	(Belgium) BEL	Brecht Dejaegere	35	4	25+5	4	0+5	0
13	MF	(Switzerland) SUI	Vincent Sierro	19	0	7+8	0	1+3	0
17	MF	(Netherlands) NED	Stijn Spierings	41	3	35+1	2	2+3	1
19	MF	(Serbia) SRB	Veljko Birmančević	34	1	25+2	0	5+2	1
22	MF	(Finland) FIN	Naatan Skyttä	2	1	0	0	1+1	1
24	MF	(Greece) GRE	Theocharis Tsingaras	4	0	0+1	0	2+1	0
28	MF	(Algeria) ALG	Farès Chaïbi	41	8	24+12	5	4+1	3
Forwards
6	FW	(Morocco) MAR	Zakaria Aboukhlal	42	15	28+9	10	5	5
7	FW	(Japan) JPN	Ado Onaiwu	37	2	9+25	2	0+3	0
9	FW	(England) ENG	Rhys Healey	4	2	0+4	2	0	0
11	FW	(France) FRA	Yanis Begraoui	5	1	1+2	0	1+1	1
21	FW	(Brazil) BRA	Rafael Ratão	34	6	25+5	5	1+3	1
27	FW	(Netherlands) NED	Thijs Dallinga	42	18	28+8	12	6	6
29	FW	(Bosnia and Herzegovina) BIH	Said Hamulić	9	0	0+6	0	0+3	0
Players transferred out during the season
19	DF	(France) FRA	Bafodé Diakité	0	0	0	0	0	0
13	MF	(France) FRA	Kléri Serber	0	0	0	0	0	0
15	MF	(France) FRA	Tom Rapnouil	0	0	0	0	0	0
29	MF	(France) FRA	Nathan Ngoumou	1	0	1	0	0	0
20	FW	(Jamaica) JAM	Junior Flemmings	0	0	0	0	0	0

Source: Competitions
