= Thijs Dallinga =

Dutch footballer (born 2000)

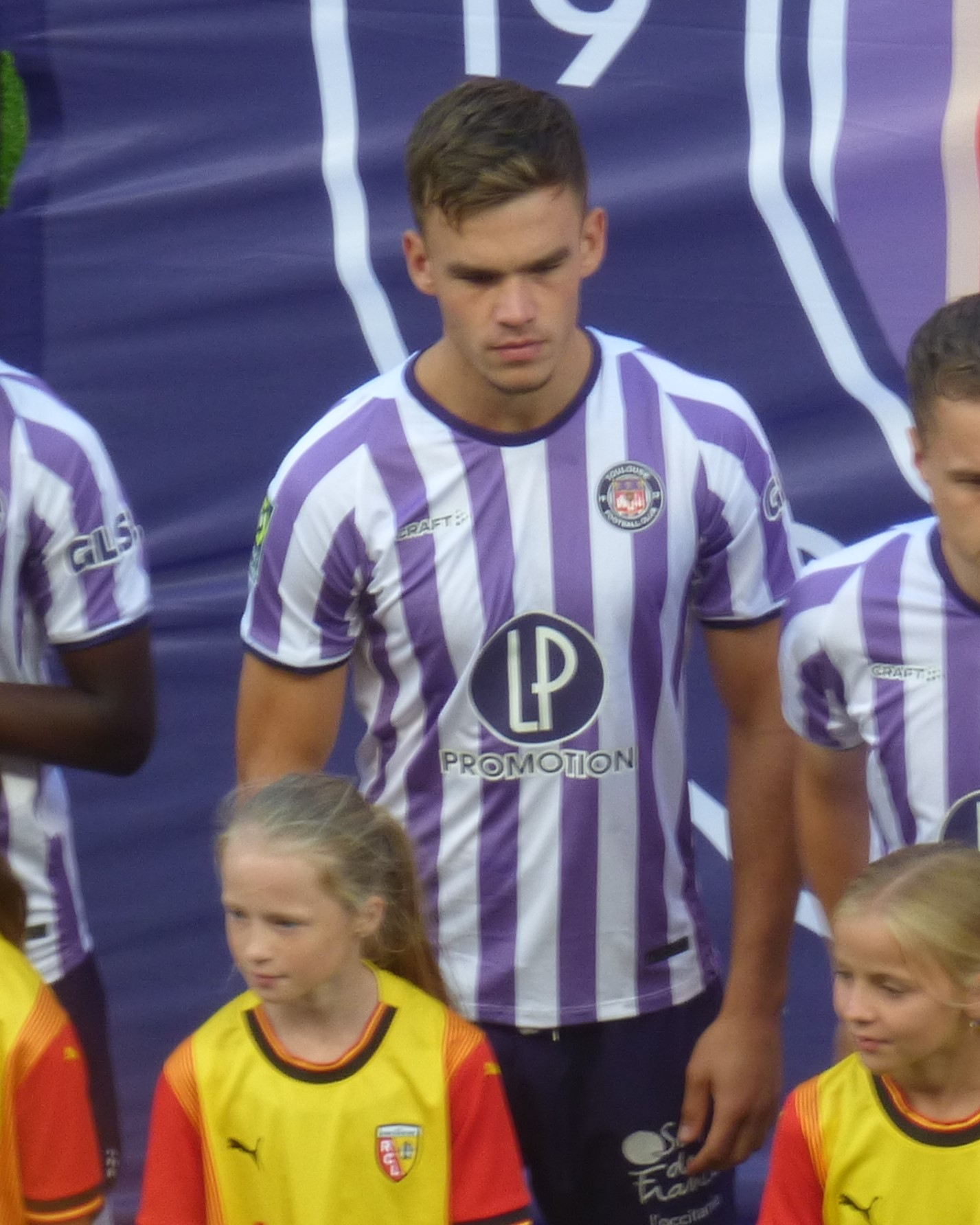
- Dallinga lining up for Toulouse in 2023

Personal information
- Date of birth: 3 August 2000 (age 26)
- Place of birth: Groningen, Netherlands
- Height: 1.80 m (5 ft 11 in)
- Position: Forward

Team information
- Current team: 1. FC Köln; (on loan from Bologna)
- Number: 27

Youth career
- VV Siddeburen
- VV Hoogezand
- 2012–2017: Emmen

Senior career*
Years	Team	Apps	(Gls)
2017–2018	Emmen	8	(1)
2018–2019	Jong Groningen	17	(5)
2019–2021	Groningen	6	(0)
2021–2022	Excelsior	37	(32)
2022–2024	Toulouse	69	(26)
2024–	Bologna	54	(5)
2026–	→ 1. FC Köln (loan)	3	(2)

International career^{‡}
2018	Netherlands U19	2	(1)
2022–2023	Netherlands U21	7	(0)
2023	Netherlands	1	(0)
- * Club domestic league appearances and goals as of 17:30, 19 September 2026 (UTC) ‡ National team caps and goals as of 21 November 2023

Thijs Dallinga (born 3 August 2000) is a Dutch professional footballer who plays as a forward for Bundesliga club 1. FC Köln, on loan from Serie A club Bologna.

Dallinga emerged as a talent of Emmen and signed with Groningen in 2018. His breakthrough came after moving to Excelsior as a free agent in 2021, scoring an unprecedented 36 goals in 43 appearances in the 2021–22 Eerste Divisie season and subsequent playoffs, to help the club win promotion to the Eredivisie. He transferred to Toulouse the following season.

Dallinga gained caps for both the Netherlands under-19 and under-21 teams before making his senior debut in 2023.

== Club career ==
=== Emmen ===
Dallinga was born in Groningen and grew up in the towns of Siddeburen and Hellum. He played youth football for VV Siddeburen and VV Hoogezand, until he joined the youth academy of FC Emmen in 2012.

He progressed through the youth teams of Emmen before making his professional debut on 27 November 2017 in a 2–1 victory over MVV in the Eerste Divisie, coming on as a substitute in the 83rd minute for Cas Peters. On 9 April 2018, he scored his first senior goal in a league match against Telstar. In his debut season, Emmen managed to win promotion to the Eredivisie via the play-offs, in which Dallinga did not make an appearance.

=== Groningen ===
On 28 June 2018, Dallinga signed a three-year contract with Groningen, and would initially join their reserve team competing in the Derde Divisie. After the reserve team withdrew from competition, Dallinga was one of the few players that would stay with the club. He was subsequently promoted to the first team.

On 12 December 2020, Dallinga made his debut for Groningen in the Eredivisie, coming off the bench in the 74th minute for Jørgen Strand Larsen in a 2–0 victory against RKC Waalwijk.

After the 2020–21 season, Dallinga chose to not extend his expiring contract in order for him to gain more experience elsewhere.

=== Excelsior ===
In May 2021, Dallinga signed for Excelsior on a free transfer, penning a contract for two seasons. He immediately became a starter in manager Marinus Dijkhuizen's team. On 6 August 2021, He made his debut in the 1–0 home loss to TOP Oss. On 13 August, he scored his first goal for Excelsior in a 2–1 away win over Roda JC Kerkrade. Three weeks later, on 3 September, Dallinga impressed by scoring four goals in the 5–0 away win over FC Den Bosch. On 25 September, he scored a brace against Jong PSV in a 3–0 win, bringing his tally to nine goals in eight league games. In the first 19 games for the club, he scored 24 goals and was on pace to break the goal record in the Eerste Divisie.

Dallinga would also prove decisive in the playoffs for promotion after Excelsior qualified by finishing sixth in the league table. He scored four goals in their six matches en route to Eredivisie promotion, including a crucial 3–3 equaliser in injury time of the final playoff tie against ADO Den Haag on 29 May 2022. This happened after having missed a penalty kick earlier in the game. With 36 goals from Dallinga that season, Excelsior achieved promotion after a penalty shoot-out.

While living in Kralingen, Rotterdam Dallinga made friends with several Irish students and credits them for his support of Irish side, Shelbourne.

=== Toulouse ===
On 1 July 2022, Dallinga signed with Toulouse in France. He made his competitive debut on the opening day of the 2022–23 Ligue 1, immediately scoring his first goal for the club after being assisted by compatriot Branco van den Boomen in a 1–1 home draw against Nice.

On 29 April 2023, Dallinga won the Coupe de France with Toulouse. Dallinga was the top scorer of the 2022–23 edition of the competition with six goals, including two goals he scored in the final against Nantes. Dallinga was praised for his brace as the Coupe de France was Toulouse's first major trophy since its establishment in 1970. Later that year, on 21 September, he scored his first goal in European competitions in a 1–1 away draw against Union Saint-Gilloise in the Europa League.

=== Bologna ===
On 23 July 2024, Dallinga joined Italian side Bologna, for a reported transfer fee of €18 million including bonuses. On 21 January 2025, he scored his first Champions League goal in a 2–1 victory over Borussia Dortmund.

==== Loan to Köln ====
On 17 August 2026, Dallinga joined Bundesliga side 1. FC Köln on a season-long loan with an option to buy.

== International career ==
In 2018, Dallinga was called up by Netherlands under-19 coach Maarten Stekelenburg for three friendly matches. He made his debut on 14 November 2018 in a 4–0 win over Armenia. On 20 November 2018, he scored the winning goal in the 2–1 victory over Portugal just eight minutes after coming off the bench.

On 22 October 2021, Dallinga received his first call up for the Netherlands under-21s but would only go on to make his debut on 23 September 2022 in a 2–1 victory over Belgium at Den Dreef in a friendly.

On 13 November 2023, Dallinga received his first call up for the senior Netherlands national team, for the UEFA Euro 2024 qualifying matches against the Republic of Ireland and Gibraltar. He made his debut in the game against Gibraltar, coming on as a substitute in a 6–0 win.

== Career statistics ==
=== Club ===
As of match played 19 September 2026

Appearances and goals by club, season and competition
Club	Season	League			National cup (Note: Includes KNVB Cup, Coupe de France, Coppa Italia, DFB-Pokal)		Europe		Other		Total	
Club	Season	Division	Apps	Goals	Apps	Goals	Apps	Goals	Apps	Goals	Apps	Goals
Emmen	2017–18	Eerste Divisie	8	1	0	0	—		0	0	8	1
Jong Groningen	2018–19	Derde Divisie	17	5	—		—		—		17	5
Groningen	2019–20	Eredivisie	0	0	0	0	—		—		0	0
Groningen	2020–21	Eredivisie	6	0	1	0	—		—		7	0
Groningen	Total		6	0	1	0	—		—		7	0
Excelsior	2021–22	Eerste Divisie	37	32	1	0	—		6 (Note: Appearances in Eerste Divisie promotion play-offs)	4	44	36
Toulouse	2022–23	Ligue 1	36	12	6	6	—		—		42	18
Toulouse	2023–24	Ligue 1	33	14	2	1	8 (Note: Appearances in UEFA Europa League)	4	1 (Note: Appearance in Trophée des Champions)	0	44	19
Toulouse	Total		69	26	8	7	8	4	1	0	86	37
Bologna	2024–25	Serie A	31	3	4	3	8 (Note: Appearances in UEFA Champions League)	1	—		43	7
Bologna	2025–26	Serie A	23	2	2	0	11	3	1 (Note: Appearance in Supercoppa Italiana)	0	37	5
Bologna	Total		54	5	6	3	19	4	1	0	80	12
1. FC Köln (loan)	2026–27	Bundesliga	3	2	1	0	—		—		4	2
Career total			194	71	17	10	27	8	8	4	246	93

=== International ===
As of match played 21 November 2023

Appearances and goals by national team and year
National team	Year	Apps	Goals
Netherlands	2023	1	0
Total		1	0

== Honours ==
Toulouse

- Coupe de France: 2022–23

Bologna

- Coppa Italia: 2024–25

Individual

- Eerste Divisie top scorer: 2021–22
