= Zakaria Aboukhlal =

Morocco international footballer (born 2000)

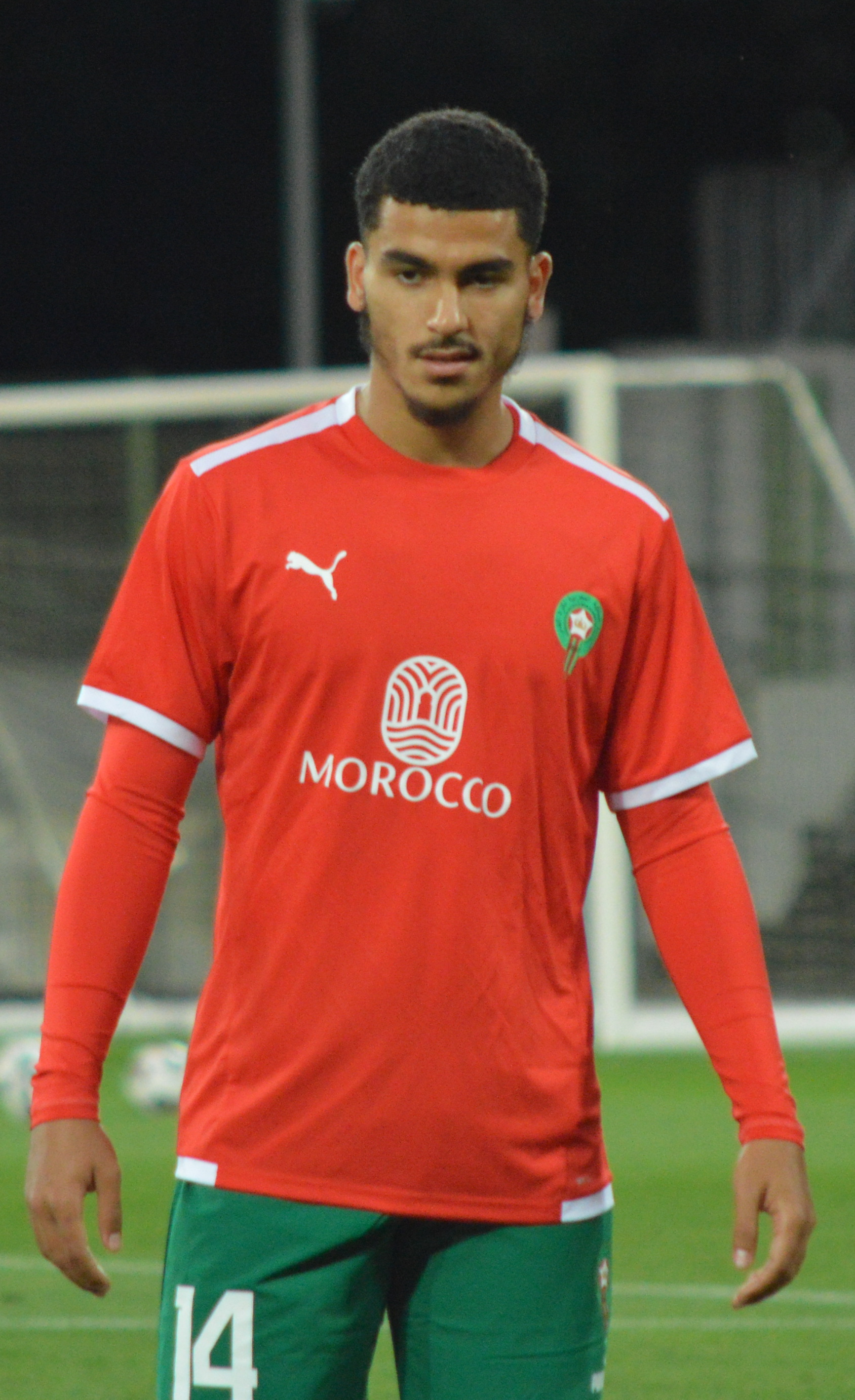
- Aboukhlal with Morocco in 2023

Personal information
- Full name: Zakaria Aboukhlal
- Date of birth: 18 February 2000 (age 26)
- Place of birth: Gorinchem, Netherlands
- Height: 1.79 m (5 ft 10 in)
- Position: Right winger

Team information
- Current team: Torino
- Number: 7

Youth career
- GVV Unitas
- GVV Raptim
- 2009–2017: Willem II
- 2017–2018: PSV

Senior career*
Years	Team	Apps	(Gls)
2018–2019	Jong PSV	25	(9)
2019	PSV	2	(0)
2019–2022	Jong AZ	19	(13)
2019–2022	AZ	69	(9)
2022–2025	Toulouse	76	(20)
2025–	Torino	15	(0)

International career^{‡}
2015	Netherlands U16	5	(0)
2016–2017	Netherlands U17	12	(5)
2017	Netherlands U18	4	(4)
2017–2019	Netherlands U19	10	(2)
2019	Netherlands U20	5	(1)
2020–	Morocco	21	(3)
- * Club domestic league appearances and goals as of 13:23, 8 March 2026 (UTC) ‡ National team caps and goals as of 20:34, 4 February 2024 (UTC)

Zakaria Aboukhlal (Arabic: زكرياء أبو خلال; born 18 February 2000) is a professional footballer who plays as a right winger for Serie A club Torino. Born in the Netherlands, he plays for the Morocco national team.

== Club career ==
=== PSV ===
Aboukhlal made his professional debut for Jong PSV in a 2–1 Eerste Divisie win over FC Eindhoven on 17 August 2018.

=== AZ ===
In August 2019, after making only two appearances for PSV's senior side, Aboukhlal transferred to Eredivisie rivals AZ Alkmaar in a deal worth €2 million. In a match for Jong AZ on 9 December 2019, he scored all four of his team's goals in a win against Helmond Sport.

=== Toulouse ===
On 24 June 2022, Aboukhlal signed with French club Toulouse. In his first season at the club, he won the Coupe de France. He scored a 79th-minute goal in the 2023 Coupe de France final to help his club beat defending champions Nantes 5–1.

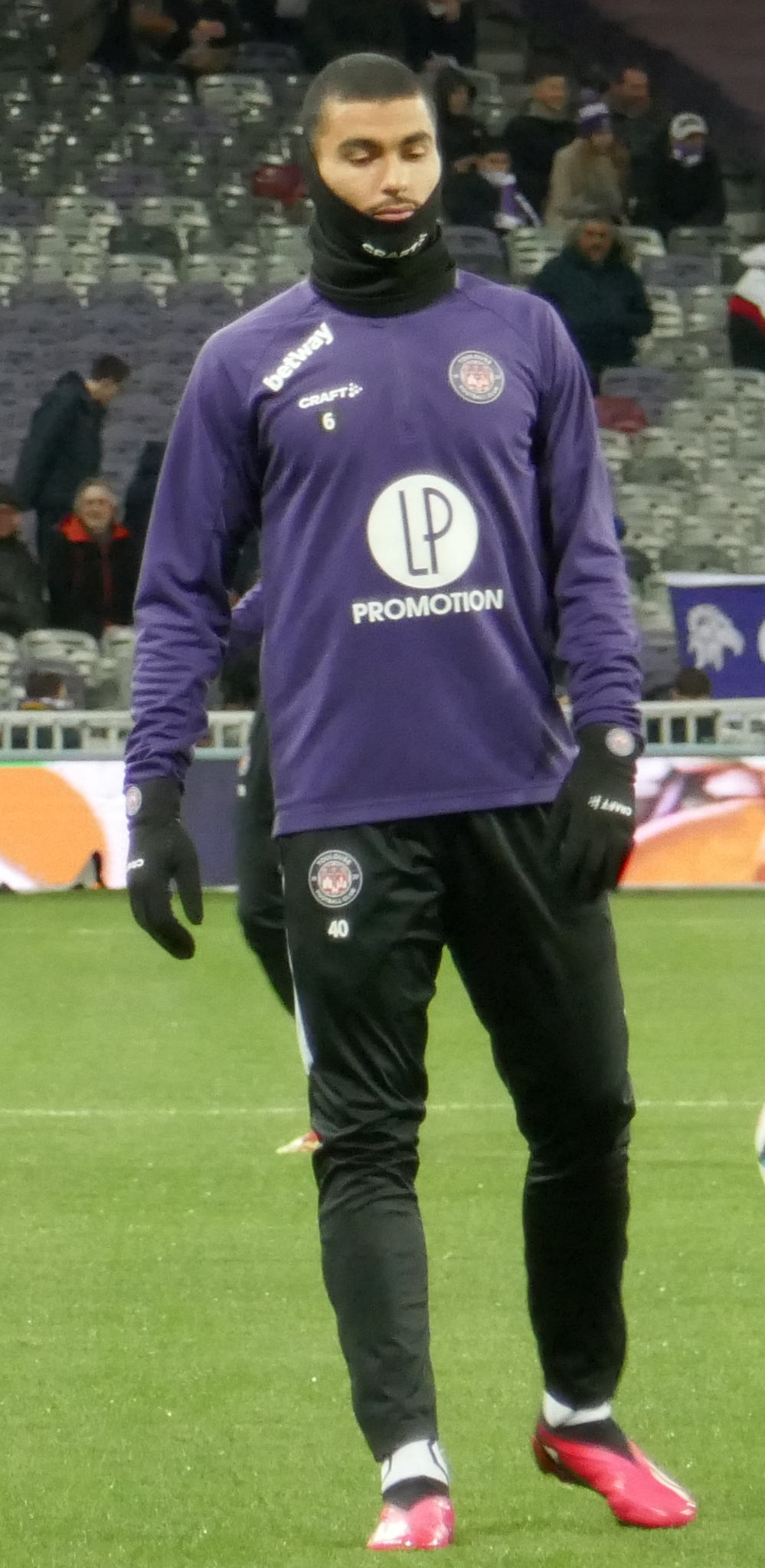
Aboukhlal warming up for Toulouse in 2023

On 14 May 2023, Aboukhlal refused to represent Toulouse in a Ligue 1 match against Nantes due to the game being a part of a league-wide campaign against homophobia, meaning all teams' kits for the week featured rainbow-themed decorations. He was in the same week accused by several news outlets, of having been involved in an alleged sexist altercation with Toulouse's female deputy major Laurence Arribagé, during Toulouse's Coupe de France title festivities at the city hall in April. Aboukhlal, who was alleged to have told Arribagé "At home, women don't talk to men like that" after Arribagé had asked some of the players to tone down their loud behaviour, was temporarily suspended from all first team activities. Following this accusation, Aboukhlal tweeted: "Following the article published by RMC on Monday, May 15th, I had the opportunity to meet and discuss with Laurence Arribagé. During this meeting, we both confirmed the RMC sport report does not match what has really happened on 30th of April at the Capitole. We would like to put an end to this controversy which has strongly affected both of us as well as our families. Thank you for respecting our decision."

=== Torino ===
On 29 July 2025, Aboukhlal signed a four-year contract with Torino in Italy.

== International career ==
Aboukhal was born in the Netherlands to a Moroccan mother and Libyan father. He is a former youth international for the Netherlands. He decided not to represent the Netherlands but the Morocco national team because of his growing up among the Moroccan community residing in the Netherlands, he was called up to represent in November 2020. He was called up for the Libya national team but refused. Aboukhlal debuted for Morocco in a 4–1 2021 Africa Cup of Nations qualification win over Central African Republic on 13 November 2020, and scored his side's fourth goal in his debut.

On 10 November 2022, he was named in Morocco's 23-man squad for the 2022 FIFA World Cup in Qatar. He scored his first goal in the World Cup against Belgium on 27 November 2022.

== Career statistics ==
=== Club ===
As of match played 15 February 2026

Appearances and goals by club, season and competition
Club	Season	League			National cup (Note: Includes KNVB Cup, Coupe de France)		Europe		Other		Total	
Club	Season	Division	Apps	Goals	Apps	Goals	Apps	Goals	Apps	Goals	Apps	Goals
Jong PSV	2018–19	Eerste Divisie	24	9	—		—		—		24	9
Jong PSV	2019–20	Eerste Divisie	1	0	—		—		—		1	0
Jong PSV	Total		25	9	—		—		—		25	9
PSV	2018–19	Eredivisie	1	0	0	0	0	0	0	0	1	0
PSV	2019–20	Eredivisie	1	0	0	0	0	0	0	0	1	0
PSV	Total		2	0	0	0	0	0	0	0	2	0
Jong AZ	2019–20	Eerste Divisie	10	8	—		—		—		10	8
Jong AZ	2020–21	Eerste Divisie	8	5	—		—		—		8	5
Jong AZ	2021–22	Eerste Divisie	1	0	—		—		—		1	0
Jong AZ	Total		19	13	—		—		—		19	13
AZ Alkmaar	2019–20	Eredivisie	12	0	2	0	1 (Note: Appearance(s) in UEFA Europa League)	0	—		15	0
AZ Alkmaar	2020–21	Eredivisie	24	4	1	0	5	0	—		30	4
AZ Alkmaar	2021–22	Eredivisie	31	4	3	1	8 (Note: Two appearances and one goal in UEFA Europa League, six appearances and one goal in UEFA Conference League)	2	3	1	45	8
AZ Alkmaar	Total		67	8	6	1	14	2	3	1	90	12
Toulouse	2022–23	Ligue 1	37	10	5	5	—		—		42	15
Toulouse	2023–24	Ligue 1	13	3	0	0	1	0	—		14	3
Toulouse	2024–25	Ligue 1	26	7	1	0	—		—		27	7
Toulouse	Total		76	20	6	5	1	0	—		83	25
Torino	2025–26	Serie A	15	0	3	0	—		—		18	0
Career total			204	50	15	6	15	2	3	1	237	59

=== International ===
Scores and results list Morocco's goal tally first, score column indicates score after each Aboukhlal goal.

List of international goals scored by Zakaria Aboukhlal
No.	Date	Venue	Opponent	Score	Result	Competition
1	13 November 2020	Mohammed V Stadium, Casablanca, Morocco	Central African Republic	4–1	4–1	2021 Africa Cup of Nations qualification
2	14 January 2022	Stade Ahmadou Ahidjo, Yaoundé, Cameroon	Comoros	2–0	2–0	2021 Africa Cup of Nations
3	27 November 2022	Al Thumama Stadium, Doha, Qatar	Belgium	2–0	2–0	2022 FIFA World Cup

== Honours ==
Toulouse

- Coupe de France: 2022–23

=== Orders ===
- Order of the Throne: 2022
