= Tom Rapnouil =

French footballer (born 2001)

Personal information
- Full name: Tom Rapnouil Zarandona
- Date of birth: 9 February 2001 (age 25)
- Place of birth: Poissy, France
- Height: 1.88 m (6 ft 2 in)
- Position: Left back

Team information
- Current team: Al-Markhiya
- Number: 44

Youth career
- 2007–2008: Touvre
- 2008–2011: Angoulême
- 2011–2016: Trélissac
- 2016–2018: Toulouse

Senior career*
Years	Team	Apps	(Gls)
2018–2023	Toulouse II	40	(0)
2021–2023	Toulouse	2	(0)
2022–2023	→ Botev Vratsa (loan)	15	(0)
2023–2025	CSKA 1948 II	17	(0)
2023–2025	CSKA 1948	11	(0)
2025–	Al-Markhiya	3	(0)

International career
2017	France U16	5	(2)
2017	France U17	2	(0)
2019	France U18	3	(0)
2024–	Martinique	2	(0)
- * Club domestic league appearances and goals as of 16:17, 4 November 2024 (UTC)

Tom Rapnouil Zarandona (born 9 February 2001) is a French-born Martiniquais professional footballer who plays for Al-Markhiya as a left back.

== Club career ==
Rapnouil made his professional debut with Toulouse in a 2–0 Coupe de France win over Bordeaux on 10 February 2021. In late August 2022, he was loaned out to Bulgarian club Botev Vratsa.

On 23 June 2023, he joined fellow Bulgarian club CSKA 1948 on a permanent transfer.

== International career ==
Born in Metropolitan France, Rapnouil is of Martiniquais descent. He is a former youth international for France, having played with them up to the France U18s. In October 2024, he was called up to the senior Martinique national team for a set of 2024–25 CONCACAF Nations League matches.

== Honours ==
Toulouse

- Ligue 2: 2021–22
