= Gabriel Suazo =

Chilean footballer (born 1997)

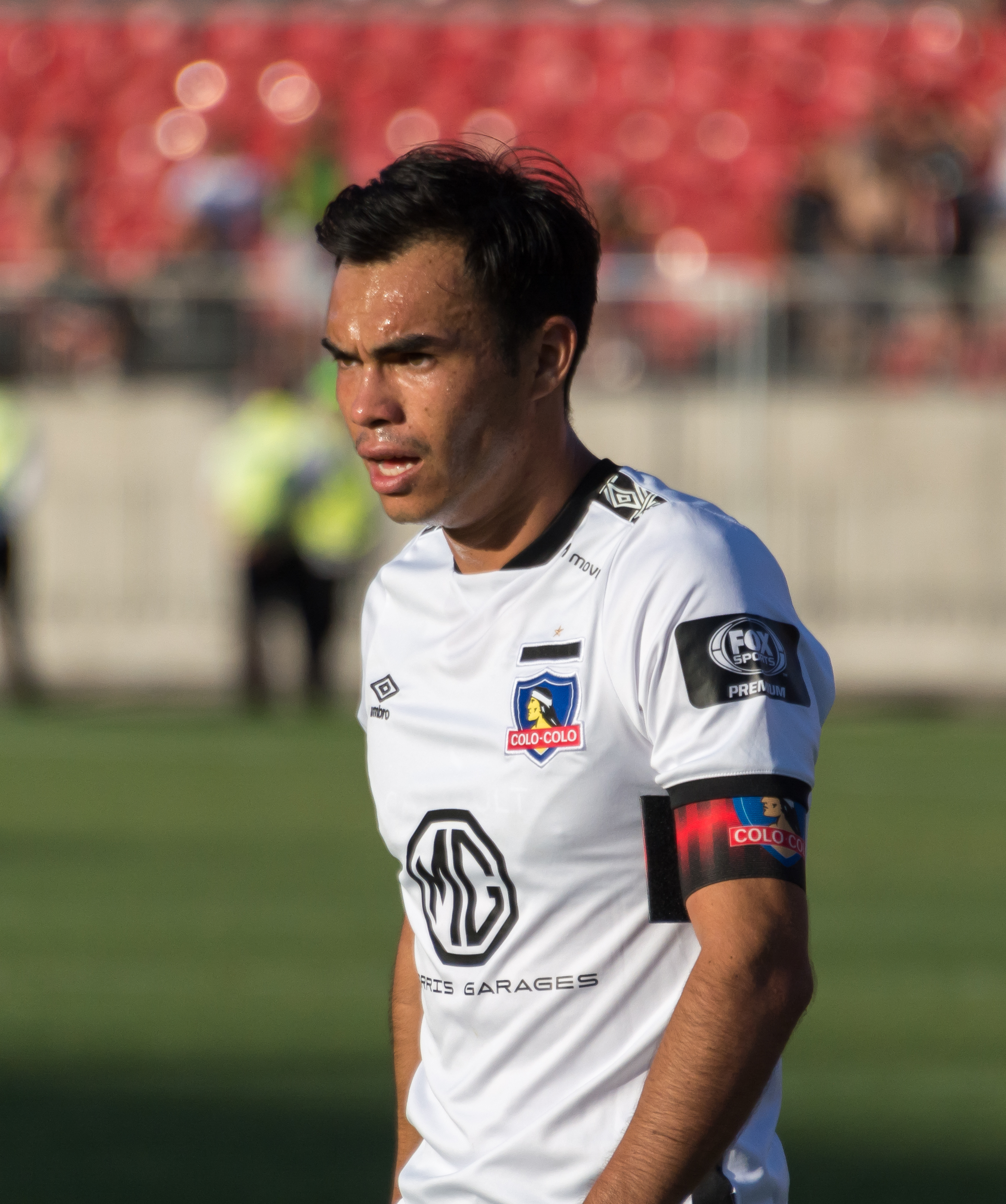
- Suazo with Colo-Colo in 2020

Personal information
- Full name: Gabriel Alonso Suazo Urbina
- Date of birth: 9 August 1997 (age 29)
- Place of birth: Santiago, Chile
- Height: 1.78 m (5 ft 10 in)
- Positions: Left-back; midfielder

Team information
- Current team: Sevilla
- Number: 17

Youth career
- Colo-Colo

Senior career*
Years	Team	Apps	(Gls)
2014	Colo-Colo B	1	(0)
2015–2023	Colo-Colo	167	(8)
2023–2025	Toulouse	79	(0)
2025–	Sevilla	42	(0)

International career^{‡}
2016–2017	Chile U20	8	(0)
2019–2020	Chile U23	7	(0)
2017–	Chile	46	(0)
- * Club domestic league appearances and goals as of 21 November 2026 ‡ National team caps and goals as of 6 October 2026

Gabriel Alonso Suazo Urbina (born 9 August 1997) is a Chilean professional footballer who plays as a left-back or midfielder for captains both La Liga club Sevilla and the Chile national team.

== Club career ==
After playing in the Colo-Colo youth teams since he was young, Suazo made his first-team debut for the club on 19 July 2015 in a Copa Chile match against Deportes Concepción.

After nine seasons with Colo-Colo, Suazo moved to France and signed for Ligue 1 club Toulouse on 16 January 2023. He became the second Chilean footballer to play for them after Jorge Infante in the 1970s. He helped his side win the Coupe de France in his first season, assisting a goal in Toulouse's 5–1 win over Nantes in the final.

On 12 July 2025, Suazo joined Sevilla on a deal for three seasons.

== International career ==
Suazo was part of the Chile under-20 squad that won the L'Alcúdia Tournament in 2015. He also represented the under-20 team at the 2017 South American Championship, and later played for the under-23 team at the 2019 Toulon Tournament.

Suazo received his first call-up for the senior Chile national team for pre-Copa América Centenario friendly matches against Jamaica and Mexico in May 2016, though he remained unused in both games. He made his debut for Chile in a friendly match against Burkina Faso on 2 June 2017.

In June 2024, Suazo was named in Chile's squad for the 2024 Copa América. In their final group match against Canada, he was sent off after accumulating two yellow cards within the first 30 minutes as Chile exited the tournament in the group stage.

== Personal life ==
Suazo was born and raised in Santiago. Growing up, his main idols included Gonzalo Fierro and Matías Fernández.

In March 2022, he married Gabriela Rojas, with whom he had been in a relationship for eight years. The couple had a son born in May 2023 in France.

== Career statistics ==
=== Club ===
As of match played 21 November 2026

Appearances and goals by club, season and competition
Club	Season	League			National cup		Continental		Other		Total	
Club	Season	Division	Apps	Goals	Apps	Goals	Apps	Goals	Apps	Goals	Apps	Goals
Colo-Colo B	2014	Chilean Segunda División	1	0	—		—		—		1	0
Colo-Colo	2015–16	Chilean Primera División	7	0	1	0	0	0	—		8	0
Colo-Colo	2016–17	Chilean Primera División	23	1	9	0	1 (Note: Appearance(s) in Copa Libertadores)	0	—		33	1
Colo-Colo	2017	Chilean Primera División	14	0	3	1	—		1 (Note: Appearance in Supercopa de Chile)	0	18	1
Colo-Colo	2018	Chilean Primera División	19	0	2	0	6	0	1	0	28	0
Colo-Colo	2019	Chilean Primera División	23	3	3	0	1 (Note: Appearance in Copa Sudamericana)	0	1	0	28	3
Colo-Colo	2020	Chilean Primera División	30	1	0	0	6	1	1	0	37	2
Colo-Colo	2021	Chilean Primera División	25	0	7	0	0	0	0	0	32	0
Colo-Colo	2022	Chilean Primera División	26	3	3	0	8 (Note: Six appearances in Copa Libertadores, two appearances in Copa Sudamericana)	0	1	0	38	3
Colo-Colo	Total		167	8	28	1	22	1	5	0	232	10
Toulouse	2022–23	Ligue 1	18	0	4	1	—		—		22	1
Toulouse	2023–24	Ligue 1	31	0	2	0	8 (Note: Appearances in UEFA Europa League)	2	1 (Note: Appearance in Trophée des Champions)	0	42	2
Toulouse	2024–25	Ligue 1	29	0	3	0	—		—		32	0
Toulouse	Total		79	0	9	1	8	2	1	0	97	3
Sevilla	2025–26	La Liga	29	0	1	0	—		—		30	0
Sevilla	2026–27	La Liga	13	0	0	0	—		—		13	0
Sevilla	Total		42	0	1	0	—		—		43	0
Career total			289	8	38	2	30	3	6	0	373	14

=== International ===
As of match played 6 October 2026

Appearances and goals by national team and year
National team	Year	Apps	Goals
Chile	2017	1	0
Chile	2018	0	0
Chile	2019	0	0
Chile	2020	0	0
Chile	2021	4	0
Chile	2022	8	0
Chile	2023	9	0
Chile	2024	9	0
Chile	2025	9	0
Chile	2026	6	0
Total		46	0

== Honours ==
Colo-Colo

- Chilean Primera División: 2015–A, Transición 2017, 2022
- Copa Chile: 2016, 2019, 2021
- Supercopa de Chile: 2017, 2018, 2022

Toulouse

- Coupe de France: 2022–23

Chile U20

- L'Alcúdia Tournament: 2015

Individual

- Chilean Primera División Team of the Season: 2022
