= Said Hamulić =

Bosnian footballer (born 2000)

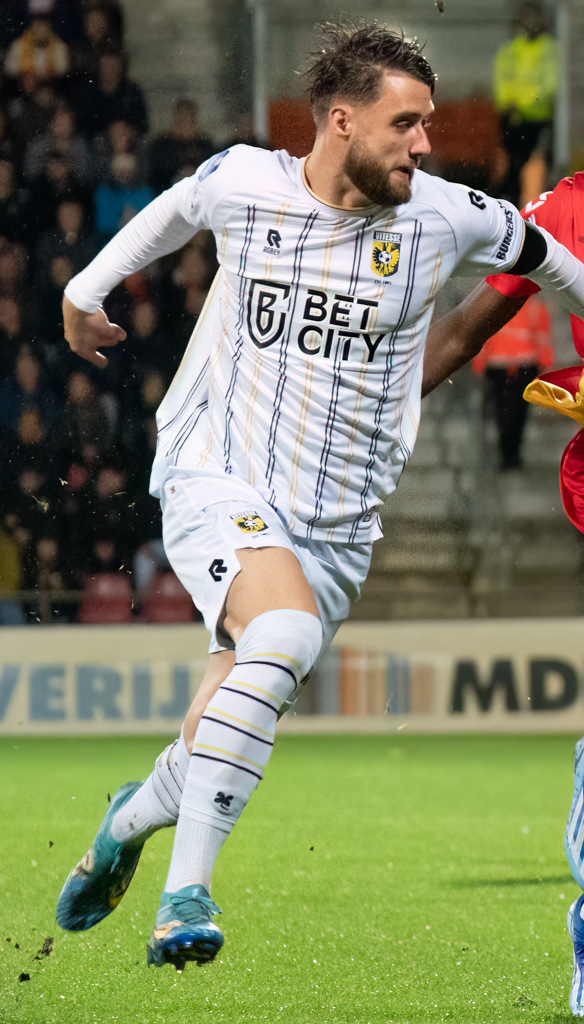
- Hamulić playing for Vitesse in 2023

Personal information
- Date of birth: 12 November 2000 (age 25)
- Place of birth: Leiderdorp, Netherlands
- Height: 1.88 m (6 ft 2 in)
- Position: Forward

Team information
- Current team: Wisła Płock
- Number: 10

Youth career
- Alphense Boys
- 2019: Go Ahead Eagles
- 2020–2021: Quick Boys

Senior career*
Years	Team	Apps	(Gls)
2021–2022	Dainava	36	(16)
2022	→ Botev Plovdiv II (loan)	1	(0)
2022	→ Sūduva (loan)	13	(6)
2022–2023	→ Stal Mielec (loan)	17	(9)
2023–2026	Toulouse	6	(0)
2023–2024	→ Vitesse (loan)	13	(0)
2024	→ Lokomotiv Moscow (loan)	1	(0)
2024–2025	→ Widzew Łódź (loan)	11	(0)
2025–2026	→ Volos (loan)	15	(4)
2026–	Wisła Płock	14	(2)

International career^{‡}
2023	Bosnia and Herzegovina	6	(0)
- * Club domestic league appearances and goals as of 19:46, 20 September 2026 (UTC) ‡ National team caps and goals as of 19 November 2023

Said Hamulić (pronounced [sâːid xǎmulitɕ]; born 12 November 2000) is a professional footballer who plays as a forward for Ekstraklasa club Wisła Płock. Born in the Netherlands, he played for the Bosnia and Herzegovina national team.

Hamulić started his professional career at Dainava, who sent him on loans to Botev Plovdiv, Sūduva and Stal Mielec, all in 2022. In 2023, he moved to Toulouse, who loaned him to Vitesse later that year, to Lokomotiv Moscow in 2024, to Widzew Łódź later that year and to Volos in 2025. Hamulić signed with Wisła Płock in 2026.

Hamulić made his senior international debut for Bosnia and Herzegovina in 2023.

== Club career ==
=== Early career ===
Hamulić started playing football at a local club Alphense Boys, before joining the youth academy of Go Ahead Eagles in 2019. A year later, he switched to Quick Boys' youth setup. In February 2021, he signed with Lithuanian team Dainava, with whom he made his professional debut and scored his first professional goal. Due to the club's relegation that season, Hamulic moved on loan to Botev Plovdiv, where he made a single appearance for the reserve team before returning to Dainava. In March 2022, he was sent on a four-month-long loan to Sūduva.

In July, he was loaned to Polish side Stal Mielec for the rest of the season.

=== Toulouse ===
In January 2023, Stal Mielec exercised their buy option on Hamulić; shortly after, he was transferred to French outfit Toulouse for an undisclosed fee, reported to be approximately €2 million. He made his official debut for the squad in a Coupe de France game against Reims on 8 February. Two weeks later, he made his league debut against Marseille. He won his first trophy with the club on 29 April, by beating Nantes in the Coupe de France final. In May, it was reported that Hamulić was among five players from Toulouse who boycotted playing during the Ligue 1 Week aimed at combating homophobia and transphobia on principled grounds. The club later released a statement about sidelining player for the match.

In July, Hamulić was sent on a season-long loan to Vitesse.

In January 2024, he was loaned to Russian side Lokomotiv Moscow for the remainder of the campaign.

In July, he was sent on loan to Widzew Łódź until the end of the season.

In August 2025, Hamulić was loaned to Greek team Volos for the rest of the season. He scored his first career hat-trick against Egaleo on 2 December.

=== Wisła Płock ===
In February 2026, Hamulić moved to Polish top-flight club Wisła Płock on a deal until May 2027.

== International career ==
In June 2023, Hamulić received his first senior call-up to Bosnia and Herzegovina, for UEFA Euro 2024 qualifiers against Portugal and Luxembourg. He debuted against the former on 17 June.

== Career statistics ==
=== Club ===
As of match played 23 May 2026

Appearances and goals by club, season and competition
Club	Season	League			National cup (Note: Includes Lithuanian Cup, Polish Cup, Coupe de France, KNVB Cup, Greek Cup)		Continental		Total	
Club	Season	Division	Apps	Goals	Apps	Goals	Apps	Goals	Apps	Goals
Dainava	2021	A Lyga	36	16	2	0	—		38	16
Botev Plovdiv II (loan)	2021–22	Vtora liga	1	0	0	0	—		1	0
Sūduva (loan)	2022	A Lyga	13	6	1	1	—		14	7
Stal Mielec (loan)	2022–23	Ekstraklasa	17	9	2	0	—		19	9
Toulouse	2022–23	Ligue 1	6	0	3	0	—		9	0
Vitesse (loan)	2023–24	Eredivisie	13	0	1	0	—		14	0
Lokomotiv Moscow (loan)	2023–24	Russian Premier League	1	0	0	0	—		1	0
Widzew Łódź (loan)	2024–25	Ekstraklasa	11	0	2	1	—		13	1
Volos (loan)	2025–26	Super League Greece	15	4	3	4	—		18	8
Wisła Płock	2025–26	Ekstraklasa	7	0	—		—		7	0
Career total			120	35	14	6	0	0	134	41

=== International ===
As of match played 19 November 2023

Appearances and goals by national team and year
National team	Year	Apps	Goals
Bosnia and Herzegovina
Bosnia and Herzegovina	2023	6	0
Total		6	0

== Honours ==
Toulouse

- Coupe de France: 2022–23
