= Philippe Montanier =

French football manager and former player (born 1964)

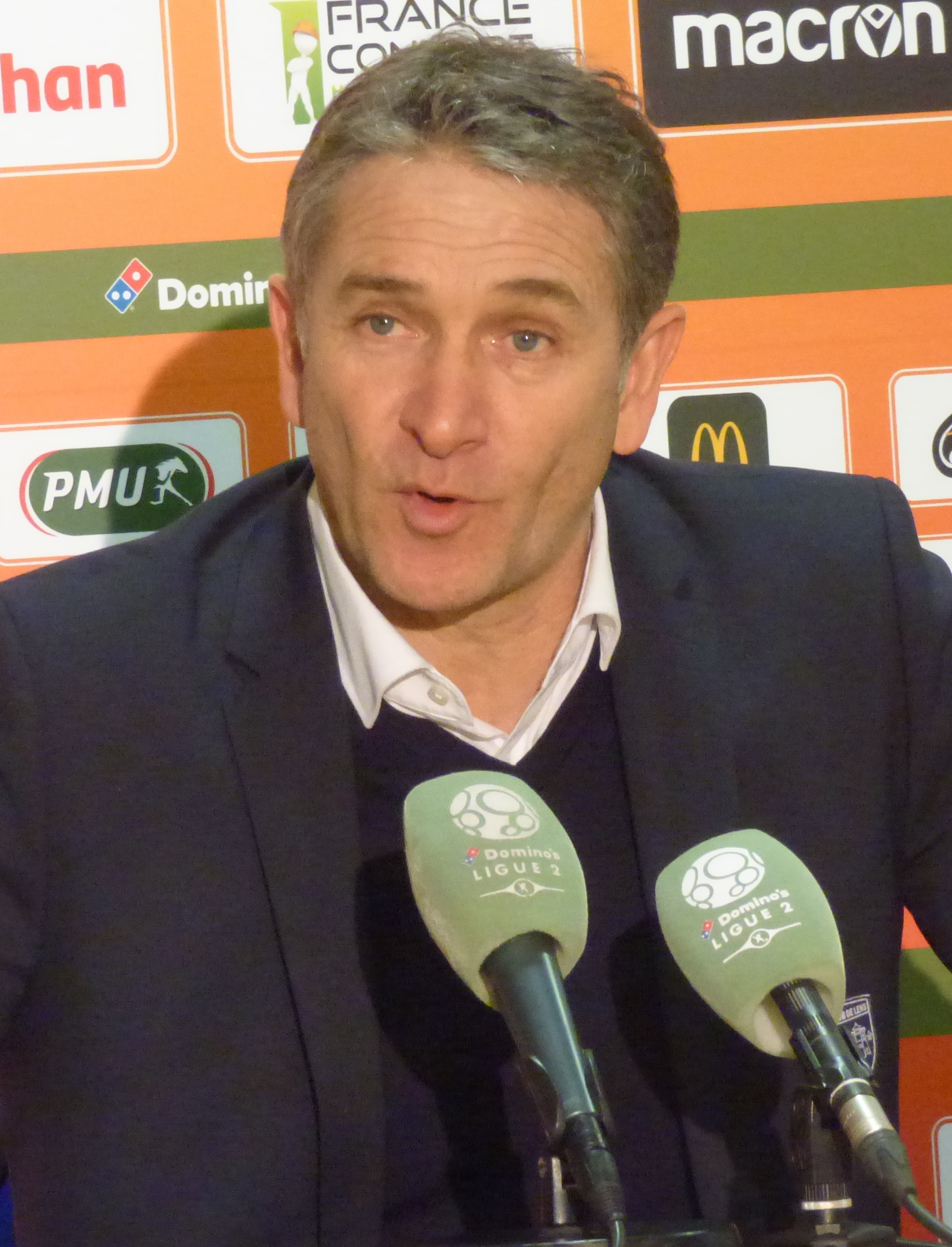
- Montanier as Lens manager in 2020

Personal information
- Full name: Philippe Jacques William Montanier
- Date of birth: 15 November 1964 (age 62)
- Place of birth: Vernon, Eure, France
- Position: Goalkeeper

Youth career
- 1970–1980: Pacy-sur-Eure
- 1980–1984: Évreux AC
- 1984–1987: Caen

Senior career*
Years	Team	Apps	(Gls)
1987–1990	Caen	55	(0)
1990–1991	Nantes	7	(0)
1991–1994	Caen	73	(0)
1994–1997	Toulouse	87	(0)
1997–1999	Gueugnon	79	(0)
1999–2000	Saint-Étienne	4	(0)
Total		305	(0)

Managerial career
- 2000–2001: Caen (CEO)
- 2001: Toulouse (assistant)
- 2001–2002: Bastia (assistant)
- 2002–2004: Ivory Coast (assistant)
- 2004–2009: Boulogne
- 2009–2011: Valenciennes
- 2011–2013: Real Sociedad
- 2013–2016: Rennes
- 2016–2017: Nottingham Forest
- 2017–2018: France U20
- 2018–2020: Lens
- 2020: Standard Liège
- 2021–2023: Toulouse
- 2026: Saint-Étienne
- * Club domestic league appearances and goals

Philippe Jacques William Montanier (born 15 November 1964) is a French professional football manager and former player. As a player, he was as a goalkeeper.

Montanier led Boulogne, Lens and Toulouse in Ligue 2, winning promotion with the first and third including as champions with the latter in 2022. In Ligue 1, he was in charge of Valenciennes, Rennes and Toulouse. He reached the Coupe de France final with Rennes in 2014 and won it with Toulouse in 2023.

Abroad, Montanier led Real Sociedad in La Liga (finishing fourth and qualifying for the UEFA Champions League in 2013), Nottingham Forest in the EFL Championship and Standard Liège in the Belgian Pro League. He was an assistant for the Ivory Coast national team and briefly managed France under-20.

== Early life and playing career ==
Philippe Jacques William Montanier was born on 15 November 1964 in Vernon, Eure. He spent most of his playing career with nearby Norman club Caen, while also representing Toulouse. After playing in Ligue 2 for Gueugnon, he concluded his career at Saint-Étienne.

== Managerial career ==
=== Early career ===
In the early 2000s, Montanier was assistant to his former Caen boss Robert Nouzaret at Toulouse, Bastia and the Ivory Coast national team.

Montanier was head coach of Boulogne from 2004 and was named Ligue 2 Manager of the Year in 2009. After achieving promotion to Ligue 1, he left Boulogne for Valenciennes on 3 June 2009.

=== Real Sociedad ===
Montanier was offered the job as La Liga club Real Sociedad manager, signing a two-year contract with the club on 4 June 2011. On his debut on 27 August, his team began the season with a 2–1 win at Sporting de Gijón with two goals from Imanol Agirretxe.

On 19 January 2013, with the winning goal by the same player, Montanier's team won 3–2 at home to Barcelona to end the visitors' unbeaten run of 18 wins and a draw. They also won home and away in the Basque derby against Athletic Bilbao – the latter being the last such fixture at the old San Mamés Stadium – to finish fourth and qualify for the UEFA Champions League.

=== Rennes ===
On 21 May 2013, it was announced that Montanier would not extend his contract at Real Sociedad, and he agreed to join Rennes the same day. He signed a deal of three years. In his first season, he led the team to the Coupe de France final, defeating former clubs Valenciennes and Boulogne in earlier rounds before a 2–0 defeat to Guingamp at the Stade de France.

=== Nottingham Forest ===
On 27 June 2016, Montanier was appointed manager of EFL Championship side Nottingham Forest. His first game in charge was on 6 August, where his side beat newly-promoted Burton Albion 4–3 at the City Ground. On 14 January 2017, Montanier was relieved of his duties following a run of two points from a possible 21 and only two clean sheets in 30 games.

=== Lens ===
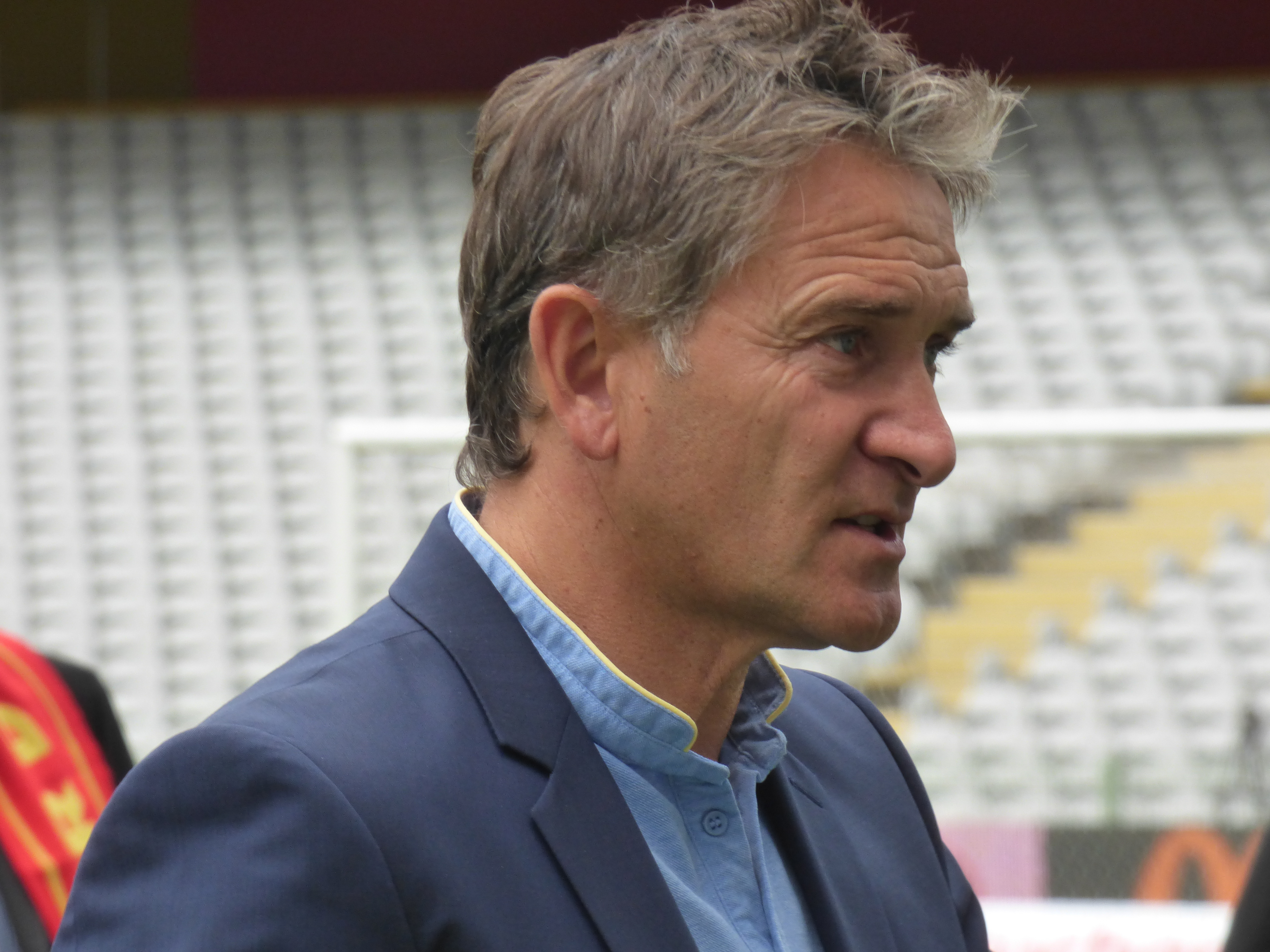
Montanier with Lens in 2018

On 2 November 2017, Montanier became the new head coach of the France under-20 team.

On 22 May 2018, Montanier took over as Lens manager in Ligue 2 on a two-year deal. In his first season, the team came 5th and lost 4–2 on aggregate to Dijon in the playoff final. He was dismissed in February 2020 with the team in third; replacement Franck Haise got them to second and promotion when the season was curtailed by the COVID-19 pandemic in March.

=== Standard Liège ===
Montanier was hired at Standard Liège in June 2020. He was dismissed on 26 December with the team in 11th, immediately after a 2–1 home loss to Sint-Truiden.

=== Toulouse ===
In June 2021, Montanier returned to work at Toulouse, where he had previously played. He signed a two-year deal. In his first season, the team returned to Ligue 1 after a two-year absence, four points above Ajaccio and with a division record 82 goals scored. He was voted the league's manager of the season.

On 6 July 2022, Montanier extended his contract to 2024. His team defeated Annecy 2–1 on 6 April 2023 to reach their first Coupe de France final, and the first for the city of Toulouse since the unrelated club of the same name lost in 1957. Twenty-three days later, the team won 5–1 against holders Nantes for the cup title – the biggest win since Saint-Étienne won 5–0 against the same opponent in 1970.

Despite the cup win, Montanier was fired on 16 June 2023 and replaced by his former assistant Carles Martínez Novell, who had never been a senior manager before. Director Damien Comolli described the 13th-place season as an "under-performance" as they had been aiming for 10th. Montanier's previous assistant Mickaël Debève had been sacked in the winter; both were known to oppose the data-driven approach of the new American ownership.

=== Saint-Étienne ===
On 1 February 2026, Montanier was appointed head coach of Saint-Étienne, returning to the club after finishing his playing career there in the 1999–00 season.

== Managerial statistics ==
As of match played 29 May 2026

Managerial record by team and tenure
Team	From	To	Record								Ref.
Team	From	To	P	W	D	L	GF	GA	GD	Win %	Ref.
Boulogne	1 July 2004	3 June 2009	207	101	43	63	292	215	+77	48.79	
Valenciennes	3 June 2009	4 June 2011	82	25	29	28	102	100	+2	30.49	
Real Sociedad	4 June 2011	30 June 2013	82	32	24	26	126	114	+12	39.02	
Rennes	1 July 2013	20 January 2016	115	40	37	38	138	137	+1	34.78	
Nottingham Forest	27 June 2016	14 January 2017	30	9	6	15	41	53	−12	30.00	
France U20	2 November 2017	22 May 2018	4	2	1	1	5	3	+2	50.00	
Lens	22 May 2018	25 February 2020	78	37	21	20	106	72	+34	47.44	
Standard Liège	10 June 2020	26 December 2020	28	10	8	10	36	37	−1	35.71	
Toulouse	23 June 2021	14 June 2023	87	45	20	22	166	98	+68	51.72	
Saint-Étienne	1 February 2026	6 June 2026	16	8	4	4	24	15	+9	50.00	
Total			729	309	193	227	1,036	844	+192	42.39	

== Honours ==
=== Manager ===
Boulogne

- Championnat National 2: 2004–05

Rennes

- Coupe de France runner-up: 2013–14

Toulouse

- Ligue 2: 2021–22
- Coupe de France: 2022–23

Individual

- Ligue 2 Manager of the Year: 2008–09, 2021–22
