= Maxime Dupé =

French footballer (born 1993)

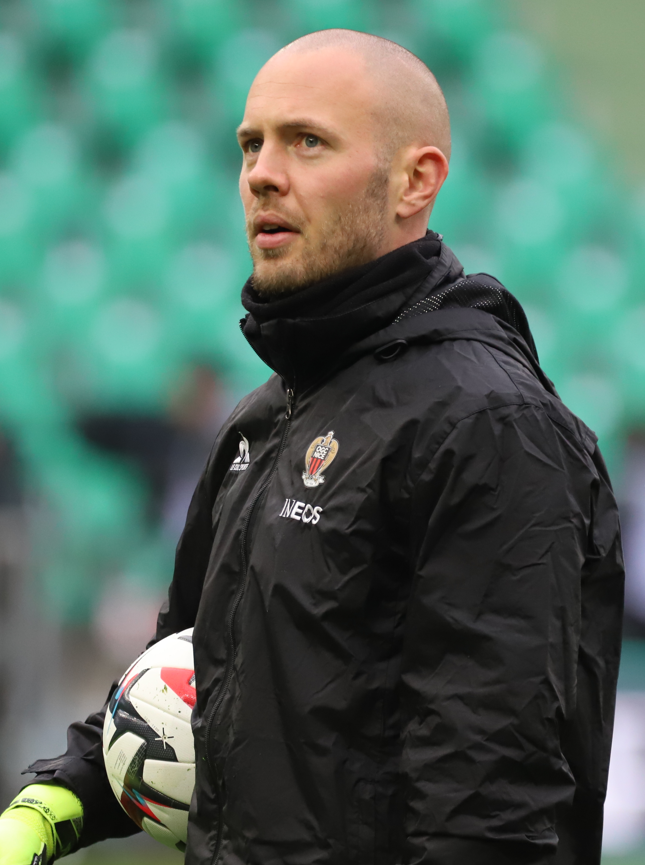
- Dupé with Nice in 2025

Personal information
- Full name: Maxime Dupé
- Date of birth: 4 March 1993 (age 33)
- Place of birth: Malestroit, France
- Height: 1.88 m (6 ft 2 in)
- Position: Goalkeeper

Team information
- Current team: Nantes
- Number: 1

Youth career
- 1999–2004: JA Pleucadeuc
- 2004–2008: Vannes
- 2008–2012: Nantes

Senior career*
| Years | Team | Apps | (Gls) |
| 2012–2016 | Nantes B | 37 | (0) |
| 2014–2020 | Nantes | 45 | (0) |
| 2019–2020 | → Clermont (loan) | 27 | (0) |
| 2020–2023 | Toulouse | 114 | (0) |
| 2023–2024 | Anderlecht | 7 | (0) |
| 2024–2026 | Nice | 8 | (0) |
| 2026– | Nantes | 0 | (0) |

International career
| 2009–2010 | France U17 | 8 | (0) |
| 2010 | France U18 | 3 | (0) |
Medal record
Representing France
Men's football
FIFA U-20 World Cup
| Winner | 2013 Turkey |
- * Club domestic league appearances and goals as of 1 March 2026

Maxime Dupé (born 4 March 1993) is a French professional footballer who plays as a goalkeeper for Ligue 2 club Nantes.

== Club career ==
Dupé joined the youth system of Nantes in 2008 and signed his first professional contract with the club in the summer of 2012. He made his Ligue 1 debut on 15 February 2014, keeping a clean sheet in a 0–0 draw against Nice.

On 27 July 2019, Dupé joined Ligue 2 side Clermont, on a one-year loan.

Toulouse announced the signing of Dupé on 29 June 2020, for a reported fee of €500,000. In 2022, Dupé won the Ligue 2 title with Toulouse.

On 18 July 2023, Dupé joined Belgian Pro League club Anderlecht on a free transfer, signing a two-year contract.

On 28 January 2024, Dupé moved to Nice in Ligue 1.

On 24 June 2026, Dupé returned to Nantes on a two-year contract.

== International career ==
Dupé has represented France at both under-17 and under-18 levels. He was an unused member of the under-20 squad that won the 2013 FIFA U-20 World Cup.

== Career statistics ==
=== Club ===
As of match played 22 May 2026

Appearances and goals by club, season and competition
| Club | Season | League | | | National Cup | | League Cup | | Europe | | Other | | Total | |
| Club | Season | Division | Apps | Goals | Apps | Goals | Apps | Goals | Apps | Goals | Apps | Goals | Apps | Goals |
|---|---|---|---|---|---|---|---|---|---|---|---|---|---|---|
| Nantes B | 2012–13 | Championnat National 3 | 17 | 0 | — | | — | | — | | — | | 17 | 0 |
| Nantes B | 2013–14 | Championnat National 2 | 15 | 0 | — | | — | | — | | — | | 15 | 0 |
| Nantes B | 2014–15 | Championnat National 2 | 2 | 0 | — | | — | | — | | — | | 2 | 0 |
| Nantes B | 2015–16 | Championnat National 2 | 1 | 0 | — | | — | | — | | — | | 1 | 0 |
| Nantes B | 2016–17 | Championnat National 2 | 2 | 0 | — | | — | | — | | — | | 2 | 0 |
| Nantes B | Total | | 37 | 0 | — | | — | | — | | — | | 37 | 0 |
| Nantes | 2013–14 | Ligue 1 | 4 | 0 | 0 | 0 | 0 | 0 | — | | — | | 4 | 0 |
| Nantes | 2014–15 | Ligue 1 | 6 | 0 | 3 | 0 | 0 | 0 | — | | — | | 9 | 0 |
| Nantes | 2015–16 | Ligue 1 | 7 | 0 | 4 | 0 | 1 | 0 | — | | — | | 12 | 0 |
| Nantes | 2016–17 | Ligue 1 | 16 | 0 | 2 | 0 | 2 | 0 | — | | — | | 20 | 0 |
| Nantes | 2017–18 | Ligue 1 | 1 | 0 | 2 | 0 | 1 | 0 | — | | — | | 4 | 0 |
| Nantes | 2018–19 | Ligue 1 | 11 | 0 | 3 | 0 | 1 | 0 | — | | — | | 15 | 0 |
| Nantes | Total | | 45 | 0 | 14 | 0 | 5 | 0 | — | | — | | 64 | 0 |
| Clermont (loan) | 2019–20 | Ligue 2 | 27 | 0 | 0 | 0 | 0 | 0 | — | | — | | 27 | 0 |
| Toulouse | 2020–21 | Ligue 2 | 38 | 0 | 0 | 0 | — | | — | | 2 (Note: Appearances in the 2020-21 Ligue 1 relegation play-offs) | 0 | 40 | 0 |
| Toulouse | 2021–22 | Ligue 2 | 38 | 0 | 0 | 0 | — | | — | | — | | 38 | 0 |
| Toulouse | 2022–23 | Ligue 1 | 38 | 0 | 0 | 0 | — | | — | | — | | 38 | 0 |
| Toulouse | Total | | 114 | 0 | 0 | 0 | — | | — | | 2 | 0 | 116 | 0 |
| Anderlecht | 2023–24 | Belgian Pro League | 7 | 0 | 0 | 0 | — | | — | | — | | 7 | 0 |
| Nice | 2023–24 | Ligue 1 | 0 | 0 | 0 | 0 | — | | — | | — | | 0 | 0 |
| Nice | 2024–25 | Ligue 1 | 0 | 0 | 3 | 0 | — | | 2 (Note: Appearances in UEFA Europa League) | 0 | — | | 5 | 0 |
| Nice | 2025–26 | Ligue 1 | 8 | 0 | 4 | 0 | — | | 2 | 0 | — | | 14 | 0 |
| Nice | Total | | 8 | 0 | 7 | 0 | — | | 4 | 0 | — | | 19 | 0 |
| Career total | | | 238 | 0 | 21 | 0 | 5 | 0 | 4 | 0 | 2 | 0 | 270 | 0 |

== Honours ==
Toulouse

- Ligue 2: 2021–22
- Coupe de France: 2022–23

Nice

- Coupe de France runner-up: 2025–26

France U20

- FIFA U-20 World Cup: 2013
