= Kjetil Haug =

Norwegian footballer (born 1998)

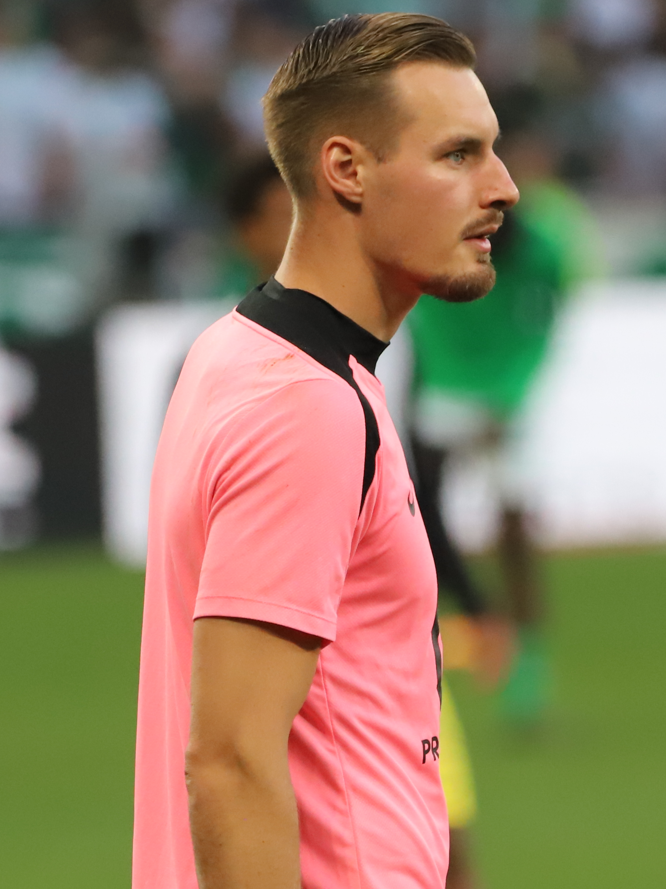
- Haug with Toulouse in 2025

Personal information
- Full name: Christian Kjetil Haug
- Date of birth: 12 June 1998 (age 28)
- Place of birth: Halden, Norway
- Height: 1.91 m (6 ft 3 in)
- Position: Goalkeeper

Team information
- Current team: Go Ahead Eagles
- Number: 1

Youth career
- –2012: Kvik Halden
- 2013–2014: Sarpsborg 08
- 2014–2018: Manchester City

Senior career*
Years	Team	Apps	(Gls)
2018–2019	Sogndal	0	(0)
2018	→ Elverum (loan)	12	(0)
2019	→ Vålerenga (loan)	0	(0)
2019–2022	Vålerenga	28	(0)
2020–2021	Vålerenga II	16	(0)
2022–2026	Toulouse	7	(0)
2023	→ Sarpsborg 08 (loan)	11	(0)
2024	→ Bodø/Glimt (loan)	0	(0)
2024	→ Odd (loan)	11	(0)
2026–	Go Ahead Eagles	10	(0)

International career^{‡}
2013	Norway U15	3	(0)
2014	Norway U16	8	(0)
2015	Norway U17	5	(0)
2015–2016	Norway U18	13	(0)
2017	Norway U19	5	(0)
2018–2019	Norway U21	5	(0)
- * Club domestic league appearances and goals as of 23 October 2026 ‡ National team caps and goals as of 29 July 2020

Kjetil Haug (born 12 June 1998) is a Norwegian professional footballer who plays as a goalkeeper for Eredivisie club Go Ahead Eagles.

== Club career ==
Playing youth football for Kvik Halden FK and Sarpsborg 08 FF, he spent time in the Manchester City FC Academy. He returned to Norway and Sogndal in 2018. Playing two cup games for Sogndal, he was loaned out to Elverum in 2018 and to Vålerenga in 2019. Here he played once in the cup. The move to Vålerenga was made permanent in the summer of 2019. He made his Vålerenga debut in July 2020.

On 28 June 2022, he joined Toulouse.

On 27 May 2026, Haug signed a three-season contract with Go Ahead Eagles.

== Career statistics ==
As of match played 23 October 2026

Appearances and goals by club, season and competition
Club	Season	League			National cup (Note: Includes Norwegian Cup, Coupe de France)		Continental		Total	
Club	Season	Division	Apps	Goals	Apps	Goals	Apps	Goals	Apps	Goals
Sogndal	2018	1. divisjon	0	0	2	0	—		2	0
Elverum (loan)	2018	2. divisjon	12	0	0	0	—		12	0
Vålerenga	2019	Eliteserien	0	0	1	0	—		1	0
Vålerenga	2020	Eliteserien	2	0	—		—		2	0
Vålerenga	2021	Eliteserien	14	0	3	0	1 (Note: Appearance(s) in UEFA Conference League)	0	18	0
Vålerenga	2022	Eliteserien	12	0	2	0	—		14	0
Vålerenga	Total		28	0	6	0	1	0	35	0
Toulouse	2022–23	Ligue 1	0	0	6	0	—		6	0
Toulouse	2024–25	Ligue 1	6	0	0	0	—		6	0
Toulouse	2025–26	Ligue 1	1	0	5	0	—		6	0
Toulouse	Total		7	0	11	0	0	0	18	0
Sarpsborg 08 (loan)	2023	Eliteserien	11	0	0	0	—		11	0
Bodø/Glimt (loan)	2024	Eliteserien	0	0	3	0	2	0	5	0
Odd (loan)	2024	Eliteserien	11	0	0	0	—		11	0
Go Ahead Eagles	2026–27	Eredivisie	10	0	0	0	—		10	0
Career total			79	0	22	0	3	0	104	0

== Honours ==
Toulouse

- Coupe de France: 2022–23
