= Farès Chaïbi =

Algerian footballer (born 2002)

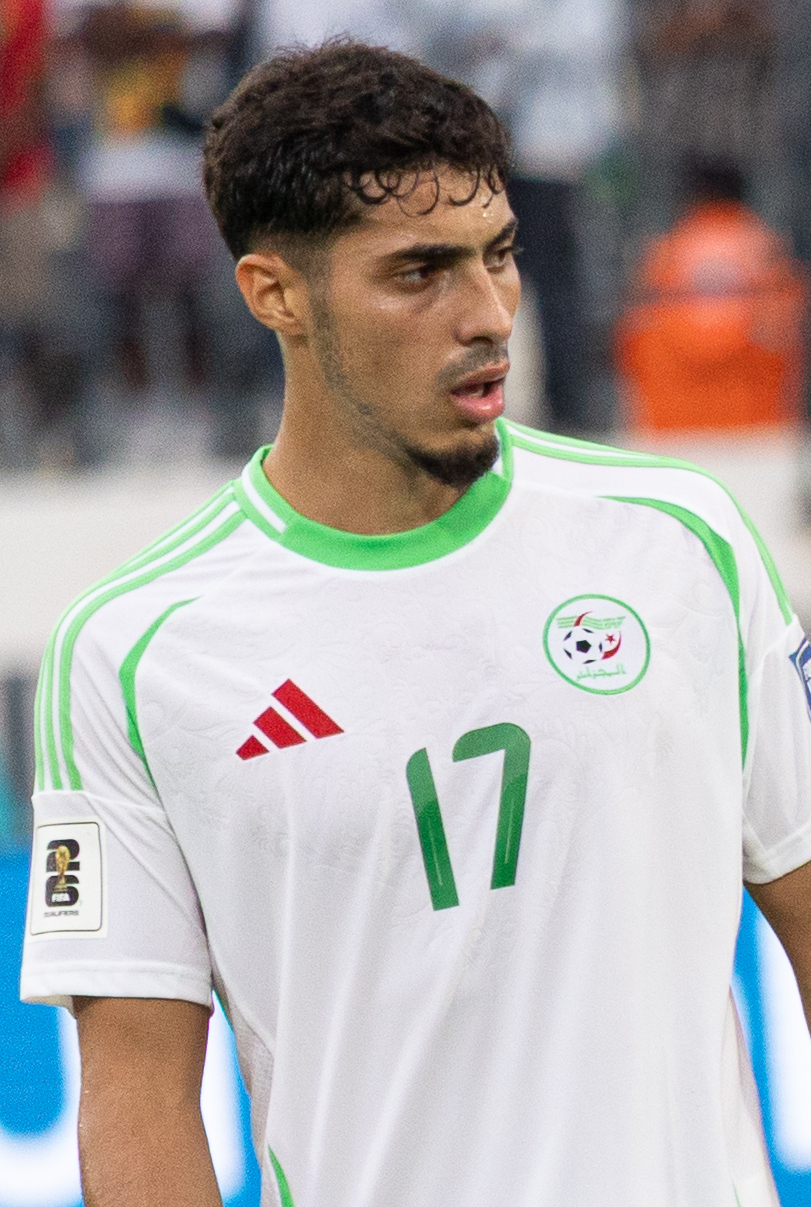
- Chaïbi with Algeria in 2025

Personal information
- Full name: Farès Chaïbi
- Date of birth: 28 November 2002 (age 23)
- Place of birth: Lyon, France
- Height: 1.83 m (6 ft 0 in)
- Positions: Winger; attacking midfielder

Team information
- Current team: Eintracht Frankfurt
- Number: 8

Youth career
- SC Bron Terraillon
- 2016–2018: AS Bron
- 2018–2019: FC Lyon
- 2019–2022: Toulouse

Senior career*
Years	Team	Apps	(Gls)
2020–2022	Toulouse B	20	(4)
2022–2023	Toulouse	38	(5)
2023–	Eintracht Frankfurt	88	(5)

International career^{‡}
2023–	Algeria	37	(3)
- * Club domestic league appearances and goals as of 1 November 2026 ‡ National team caps and goals as of 29 September 2026

Farès Chaïbi (Arabic: فارس شايبي; born 28 November 2002) is a professional footballer who plays as a winger or attacking midfielder for Bundesliga club Eintracht Frankfurt. Born in France, he plays for the Algeria national team.

== Club career ==
=== Early career ===
A native of Bron, in the suburbs of Lyon, Chaïbi came through the youth ranks of local teams SC Bron Terraillon and AS Bron. At 15, he joined the youth academy of FC Lyon, before joining the Toulouse in 2019, where he signed his first professional contract in February 2022.

=== Toulouse ===
During the following pre-season, Chaïbi was one of the standout players of the friendly games, proving to be decisive against the likes of Nîmes or the Real Sociedad, finishing this preparation with three goals and two assists.

He made his professional debut on 7 August 2022, starting for Toulouse in their first game back in Ligue 1, a 1–1 draw against Nice.

=== Eintracht Frankfurt ===
On 30 August 2023, Bundesliga side Eintracht Frankfurt announced the signing of Chaïbi on a five-year contract, for a reported fee of €17 million.

== International career ==
Chaïbi was born in France and holds both French and Algerian nationalities. He was called up to a training camp for the Algeria U20s in October 2020. In the March 2023 international break, the French Football Federation showed interest for him to represent their national team, but Chaïbi refused the call up and accepted Algeria's call up instead, as he committed to their national team. On 23 March 2023, he debuted with Algeria in a 2–1 2023 Africa Cup of Nations qualification win over Niger.

In December 2023, he was named in Algeria's squad for the 2023 Africa Cup of Nations.

On 31 May 2026, Chaïbi was named in Vladimir Petković's 26-man Algeria squad for the 2026 FIFA World Cup.

== Controversy ==
On 14 May 2023, Chaïbi initially refused to participate in a Ligue 1 match against Nantes due to the game being a part of a league-wide campaign against homophobia, with team kits featuring a rainbow-themed decoration.

== Personal life ==
His older brother Ilyes Chaïbi is also a professional footballer.

== Career statistics ==
=== Club ===
As of match played 1 November 2026

Appearances and goals by club, season and competition
Club	Season	League			National cup (Note: Includes Coupe de France, DFB-Pokal)		Europe		Total	
Club	Season	Division	Apps	Goals	Apps	Goals	Apps	Goals	Apps	Goals
Toulouse B	2020–21	Championnat National 3	3	1	—		—		3	1
Toulouse B	2021–22	Championnat National 3	17	1	—		—		17	1
Toulouse B	Total		20	2	—		—		20	2
Toulouse	2022–23	Ligue 1	36	5	5	3	—		41	8
Toulouse	2023–24	Ligue 1	2	0	0	0	—		2	0
Toulouse	Total		38	5	5	3	—		43	8
Eintracht Frankfurt	2023–24	Bundesliga	28	2	2	0	5 (Note: Appearances in UEFA Europa Conference League)	1	35	3
Eintracht Frankfurt	2024–25	Bundesliga	26	1	2	1	10 (Note: Appearances in UEFA Europa League)	0	38	2
Eintracht Frankfurt	2025–26	Bundesliga	28	2	2	0	8 (Note: Appearances in UEFA Champions League)	1	38	3
Eintracht Frankfurt	2026–27	Bundesliga	6	0	2	1	—		8	1
Eintracht Frankfurt	Total		88	5	8	2	23	2	119	9
Career total			146	12	13	5	23	2	182	19

=== International ===
As of match played 29 September 2026

Appearances and goals by national team, year and competition
Team	Year	Competitive		Friendly		Total	
Team	Year	Apps	Goals	Apps	Goals	Apps	Goals
Algeria	2023	5 (Note: Appearances in 2023 Africa Cup of Nations qualification)	1	4	1	9	2
Algeria	2024	3 (Note: Appearances in 2023 Africa Cup of Nations)	0	3	0	6	0
Algeria	2025	8 (Note: Five appearances in 2026 FIFA World Cup qualification, three appearances and one goal in 2025 Africa Cup of Nations)	1	3	0	11	1
Algeria	2026	8 (Note: Two appearances in 2025 Africa Cup of Nations, four appearances in 2026 FIFA World Cup, two appearances in 2027 Africa Cup of Nations qualification)	0	3	0	11	0
Career total		24	2	13	1	37	3

== Honours ==
Toulouse

- Coupe de France: 2022–23
