= Stijn Spierings =

Dutch footballer (born 1996)

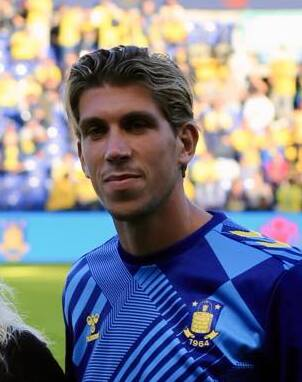
- Spierings with Brøndby in 2024

Personal information
- Date of birth: 12 March 1996 (age 30)
- Place of birth: Alkmaar, Netherlands
- Height: 1.88 m (6 ft 2 in)
- Position: Midfielder

Team information
- Current team: Real Salt Lake
- Number: 6

Youth career
- AZ

Senior career*
Years	Team	Apps	(Gls)
2015–2016	AZ	2	(0)
2016	→ Sparta Rotterdam (loan)	6	(1)
2016–2018	Sparta Rotterdam	47	(3)
2016–2018	Jong Sparta Rotterdam	20	(3)
2018–2020	RKC Waalwijk	35	(10)
2020	Levski Sofia	16	(4)
2020–2023	Toulouse	98	(12)
2023–2024	Lens	4	(0)
2023–2024	→ Toulouse (loan)	22	(0)
2024–2025	Brøndby	29	(2)
2026–	Real Salt Lake	16	(1)

International career
2012–2013	Netherlands U17	2	(0)
2013–2014	Netherlands U18	3	(0)
2014–2015	Netherlands U19	3	(0)
2015–2016	Netherlands U20	5	(0)
- * Club domestic league appearances and goals as of 07:37, 8 September 2026 (UTC)

Stijn Spierings (born 12 March 1996) is a Dutch professional footballer who plays as a midfielder for Major League Soccer club Real Salt Lake.

== Club career ==
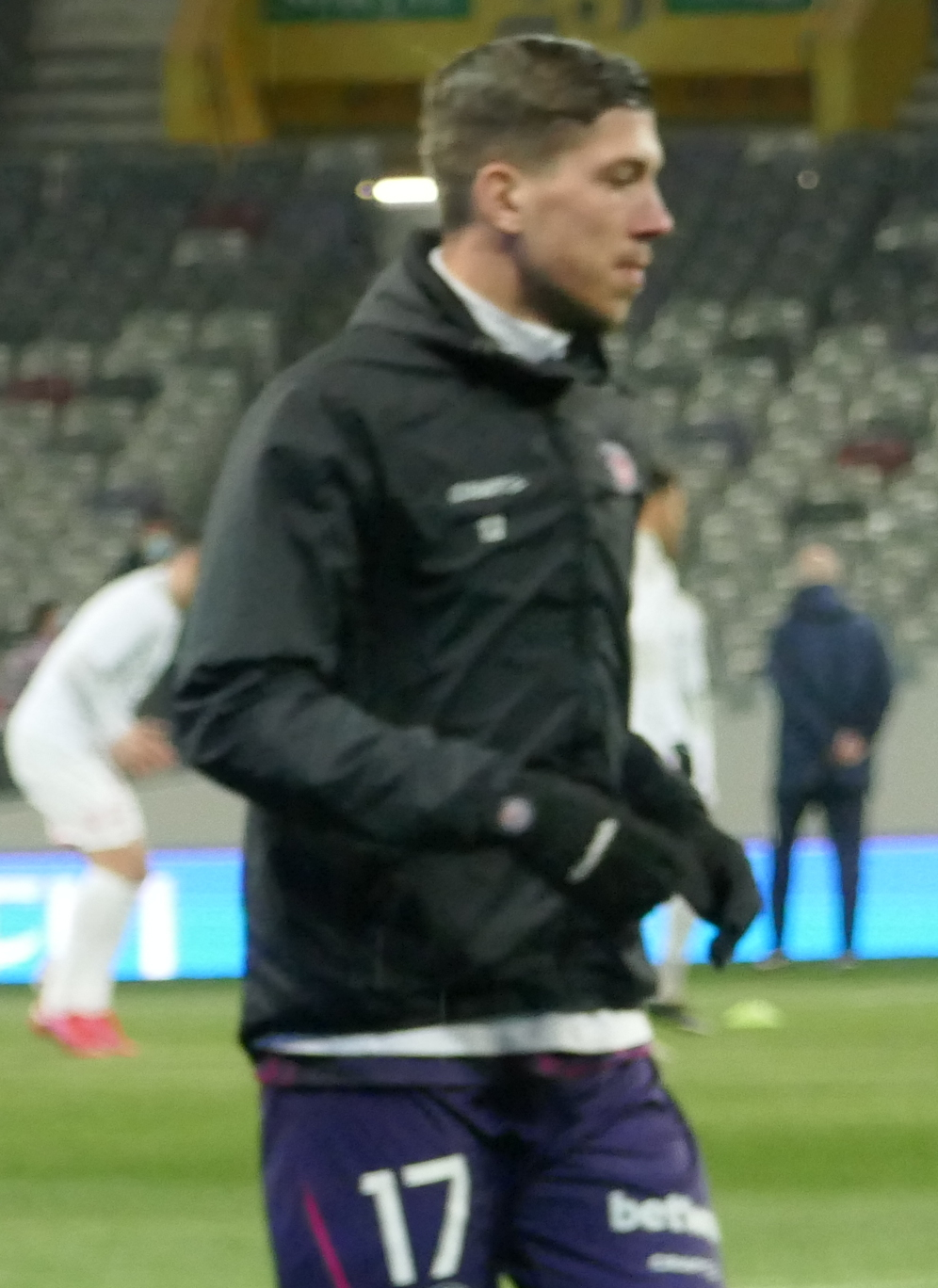
Spierings during training with Toulouse in 2022

Born in Alkmaar, Spierings began his youth career and professional career with his local team AZ. Having broken into the first team he played on just two occasions in his first season, against PSV and Excelsior. He was then loaned to Sparta Rotterdam and played a role in their successful campaign to get promoted from the Eerste Divisie. At the end of that season Spierings signed a permanent deal with the club and has played in the youth team.

On 7 January 2019, he signed a one-and-a-half-year contract with RKC Waalwijk.

One year later, on 13 January 2020, Spierings moved abroad, signing a three-year deal with Bulgarian First League side Levski Sofia.

On 5 October 2020, Spierings signed a three-year contract with Ligue 2 club Toulouse. He thereby became the third Dutch player to wear the club's colours, after Rob Rensenbrink and Branco van den Boomen. Spierings was in head coach Patrice Garande's starting lineup in his first match on 17 October against Ajaccio, in which he scored the later winner on a penalty-kick, securing the 1–0 victory. He scored five goals in his first eight games.

On 23 June 2023, Spierings signed for Ligue 1 club Lens on a four-year contract.

On 28 August 2024, Danish Superliga club Brøndby confirmed that they had bought Spierings, who signed a deal until June 2027.

On 25 January 2026, Brøndby announced the departure of Spierings to Major League Soccer club Real Salt Lake.

On 14 March 2026, Spierings scored the game-winning goal in the 88th minute of his debut appearance for Real Salt Lake. He was recognized as the player of the match for his performance.

== International career ==
Stijn Spierings has also turned out appearances with the Netherlands national team at youth level as well. He has played for the U17s and the U19 teams.

== Career statistics ==
As of match played 2 November 2025

Appearances and goals by club, season and competition
Club	Season	League			National cup (Note: Includes KNVB Cup, Bulgarian Cup, Coupe de France)		Europe		Other		Total	
Club	Season	Division	Apps	Goals	Apps	Goals	Apps	Goals	Apps	Goals	Apps	Goals
AZ	2014–15	Eredivisie	2	0	0	0	—		—		2	0
AZ	2015–16	Eredivisie	0	0	0	0	—		—		0	0
Sparta Rotterdam (loan)	2015–16	Eerste Divisie	6	1	0	0	—		—		6	1
Sparta Rotterdam	2016–17	Eredivisie	22	1	3	0	—		—		25	1
Sparta Rotterdam	2017–18	Eredivisie	16	2	1	0	—		4 (Note: Appearances in Eredivisie relegation play-offs)	1	21	3
Sparta Rotterdam	2018–19	Eerste Divisie	9	0	0	0	—		—		9	0
Sparta Rotterdam	Total		53	4	4	0	—		4	1	61	5
Jong Sparta	2016–17	Tweede Divisie	1	1	—		—		—		1	1
Jong Sparta	2017–18	Tweede Divisie	9	2	—		—		—		9	2
Jong Sparta	2018–19	Tweede Divisie	10	0	—		—		—		10	0
Jong Sparta	Total		20	3	0	0	—		0	0	20	3
RKC Waalwijk	2018–19	Eerste Divisie	18	7	0	0	—		5 (Note: Appearances in Eerste Divisie promotion play-offs)	4	23	11
RKC Waalwijk	2019–20	Eredivisie	17	3	1	0	—		—		18	3
RKC Waalwijk	Total		35	10	1	0	—		5	4	41	14
Levski Sofia	2019–20	Parva Liga	9	2	3	0	—		—		12	2
Levski Sofia	2020–21	Parva Liga	7	2	0	0	—		—		7	2
Levski Sofia	Total		16	4	3	0	—		0	0	19	4
Toulouse	2020–21	Ligue 2	27	9	3	1	—		2 (Note: Appearances in Ligue 2 promotion play-offs)	1	32	11
Toulouse	2021–22	Ligue 2	35	1	2	0	—		—		37	1
Toulouse	2022–23	Ligue 1	36	2	4	1	—		—		40	3
Toulouse	Total		98	12	9	2	—		2	1	109	15
Lens	2023–24	Ligue 1	4	0	—		—		—		4	0
Toulouse (loan)	2023–24	Ligue 1	22	0	2	0	2 (Note: Appearances in UEFA Europa League)	0	1 (Note: Appearance in Trophée des Champions)	0	27	0
Brøndby	2024–25	Danish Superliga	12	0	4	0	0	0	—		16	0
Brøndby	2025–26	Danish Superliga	13	2	2	0	5 (Note: Appearances in UEFA Conference League)	0	—		20	2
Brøndby	Total		25	2	6	0	5	0	—		36	2
Career total			275	35	25	2	7	0	12	6	319	43

== Honours ==
Sparta Rotterdam

- Eerste Divisie: 2015–16

Toulouse

- Coupe de France: 2022–23
- Ligue 2: 2021–22
