= Branco van den Boomen =

Dutch footballer (born 1995)

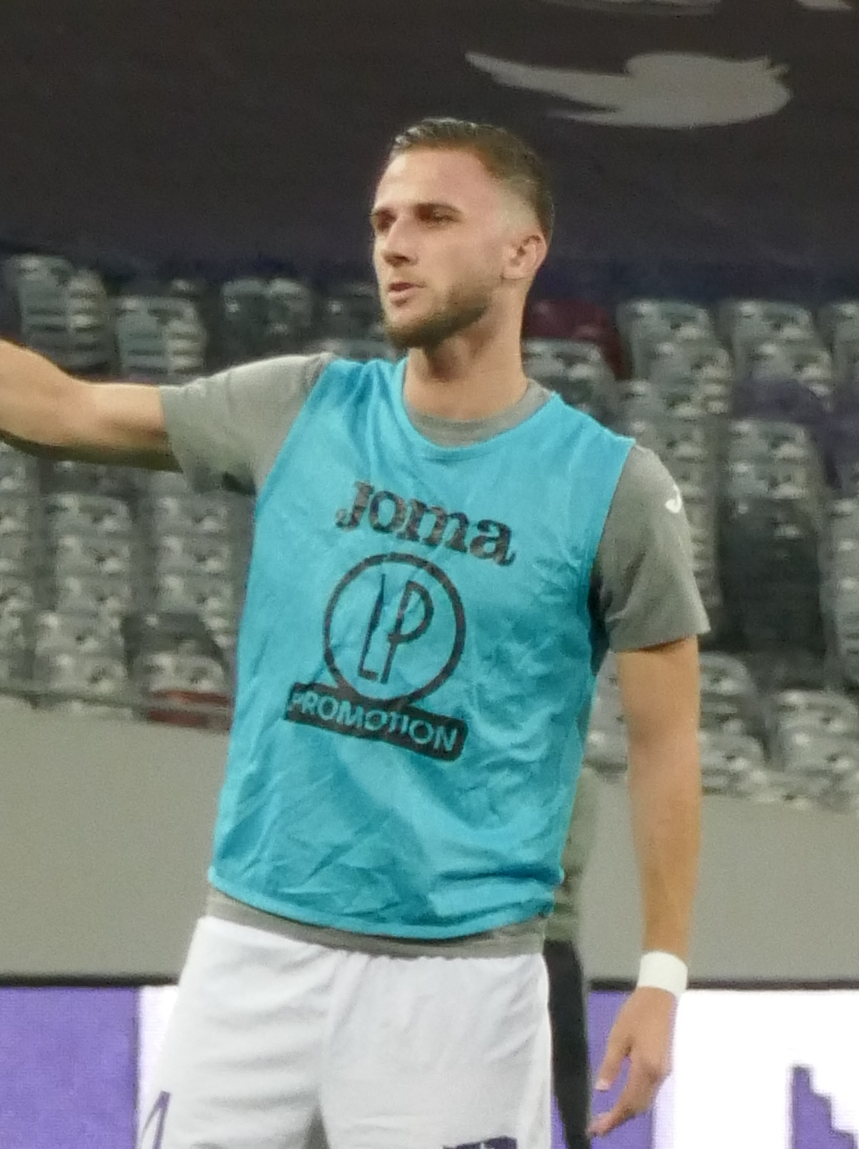
- Van den Boomen with Toulouse in 2020

Personal information
- Date of birth: 21 July 1995 (age 31)
- Place of birth: Veldhoven, Netherlands
- Height: 1.88 m (6 ft 2 in)
- Position: Midfielder

Team information
- Current team: Angers (on loan from Ajax)
- Number: 8

Youth career
- –2004: RKVVO
- 2004–2011: Willem II/RKC Waalwijk
- 2011–2013: Ajax

Senior career*
Years	Team	Apps	(Gls)
2013–2014	Jong Ajax	15	(1)
2014–2015	Eindhoven	37	(4)
2015–2017	Heerenveen	23	(1)
2016–2017	→ Willem II (loan)	8	(0)
2017–2019	Eindhoven	76	(17)
2019–2020	De Graafschap	24	(5)
2020–2023	Toulouse	107	(22)
2023–2026	Ajax	33	(2)
2026	→ Angers (loan)	15	(0)
2026–	Angers	9	(1)

International career^{‡}
2010	Netherlands U15	3	(2)
2010–2011	Netherlands U16	4	(0)
2012	Netherlands U18	3	(0)
2014	Netherlands U19	1	(0)
2014	Netherlands U20	2	(0)
Medal record
Men's football
Representing Netherlands
UEFA European Under-17 Championship
Winner	2012 Slovenia
- * Club domestic league appearances and goals as of 1 November 2026 ‡ National team caps and goals as of 13 October 2014

Branco van den Boomen (born 21 July 1995) is a Dutch professional footballer who plays as a midfielder for Ligue 1 club Angers on loan from Ajax.

== Club career ==
=== Ajax ===
Born in Veldhoven, Van den Boomen began his football career in the youth ranks of RKVVO in Oerle, before moving to nearby Willem II/RKC Waalwijk in 2004. He then joined the famed Ajax Youth Academy signing his first professional contract, a three-year deal with Ajax on 4 March 2011.

Van den Boomen began the 2013–14 season playing for Ajax A1, the under-19 team, playing in the Nike A-Juniors Eredivisie. He also competed in three matches in the UEFA Youth League while scoring once against AC Milan U19, which earned him a berth with the club's reserves squad Jong Ajax competing in the Eerste Divisie, the 2nd tier of professional football in the Netherlands. He made his debut for Jong Ajax on 11 November 2013 in a match against De Graafschap, coming on as a substitute in the 63rd minute for Wang Chengkuai who also made his debut in the same match. The match ended in a 2–1 loss at home for Jong Ajax. Van den Boomen scored his first professional goal in an away match against SC Telstar, scoring in the 3rd minute of the 3–1 loss. In January 2014 it was announced that Van den Boomen had officially been promoted to the Jong Ajax squad, and would not return to the club's youth ranks.

=== FC Eindhoven ===
On 19 June 2014, it was announced that Van den Boomen had signed with FC Eindhoven as a free transfer, returning to his city of birth, signing a three-year contract with the club. He made his first appearance for his new club on 15 August 2014 in a 3–0 home win against FC Emmen.

=== Toulouse ===
On 7 August 2020, Van den Boomen left the Netherlands for the first time in his career and joined French club Toulouse, who had been relegated to Ligue 2 after finishing 20th during the 2019–20 Ligue 1 season. Toulouse agreed to a €350,000 transfer fee with De Graafschap. Van den Boomen became the second Dutch player to join Toulouse after Rob Rensenbrink.

In the 2020–21 season, Van den Boomen became one of the key players of the Toulouse midfield also composed of Stijn Spierings and Brecht Dejaegere, scoring five goals and making seven assists. The 2021–22 season saw Van den Boomen massively improve his numbers, scoring twelve goals and assisting a league-record twenty-one.

=== Return to Ajax ===
On 29 May 2023, Van den Boomen signed a pre-contract agreement with Eredivisie club Ajax, where he spent three years in his early career. He signed a four-year deal running from 1 July 2023 to 30 June 2027.

On 21 January 2026, he joined Angers in France on loan.

== Career statistics ==
As of match played 1 November 2026

Appearances and goals by club, season and competition
Club	Season	League			National cup (Note: Includes KNVB Cup, Coupe de France)		Europe		Other		Total	
Club	Season	Division	Apps	Goals	Apps	Goals	Apps	Goals	Apps	Goals	Apps	Goals
Jong Ajax	2013–14	Eerste Divisie	15	1	—		—		—		15	1
Eindhoven	2014–15	Eerste Divisie	37	4	1	0	—		2 (Note: Appearances in Eerste Divisie promotion play-offs)	0	40	4
Heerenveen	2015–16	Eredivisie	23	1	0	0	—		—		23	1
Willem II (loan)	2016–17	Eredivisie	8	0	1	0	—		—		9	0
Eindhoven	2017–18	Eerste Divisie	37	2	2	0	—		—		39	2
Eindhoven	2018–19	Eerste Divisie	36	11	1	0	—		—		37	11
Eindhoven	2019–20	Eerste Divisie	3	4	0	0	—		—		3	4
Eindhoven	Total		76	17	3	0	—		—		79	17
De Graafschap	2019–20	Eerste Divisie	24	5	1	0	—		—		25	5
Toulouse	2020–21	Ligue 2	35	5	2	0	—		3 (Note: Appearances in Ligue 2 promotion play-offs)	0	40	5
Toulouse	2021–22	Ligue 2	37	12	4	0	—		—		41	12
Toulouse	2022–23	Ligue 1	35	5	5	1	—		—		40	5
Toulouse	Total		107	22	11	1	—		3	0	121	24
Ajax	2023–24	Eredivisie	21	2	0	0	8 (Note: Five appearances in UEFA Europa League, three appearances and one goal in UEFA Europa Conference League)	1	—		29	3
Ajax	2024–25	Eredivisie	12	0	1	0	13 (Note: Appearances in UEFA Europa League)	2	—		26	2
Ajax	2025–26	Eredivisie	0	0	1	0	0	0	—		1	0
Ajax	Total		33	2	2	0	21	3	—		56	5
Angers (loan)	2025–26	Ligue 1	15	0	—		—		—		15	0
Angers	2026–27	Ligue 1	9	1	0	0	—		—		9	1
Angers	Angers total		24	1	0	0	—		—		24	1
Career total			347	53	19	1	21	3	5	0	392	57

== Honours ==
Toulouse

- Coupe de France: 2022–23
- Ligue 2: 2021–22

Individual

- UNFP Ligue 2 Team of the Year: 2021–22
- Eerste Divisie top assist provider: 2017–18
- Ligue 2 Player of the Year: 2021–22
- Ligue 2 top assist provider: 2021–22

== Personal life ==
Branco van den Boomen was named after Brazilian footballer Branco.
