= 2024–25 Paris Saint-Germain FC season =

55th season in existence of Paris Saint-Germain

Paris Saint-Germain
2024–25 season
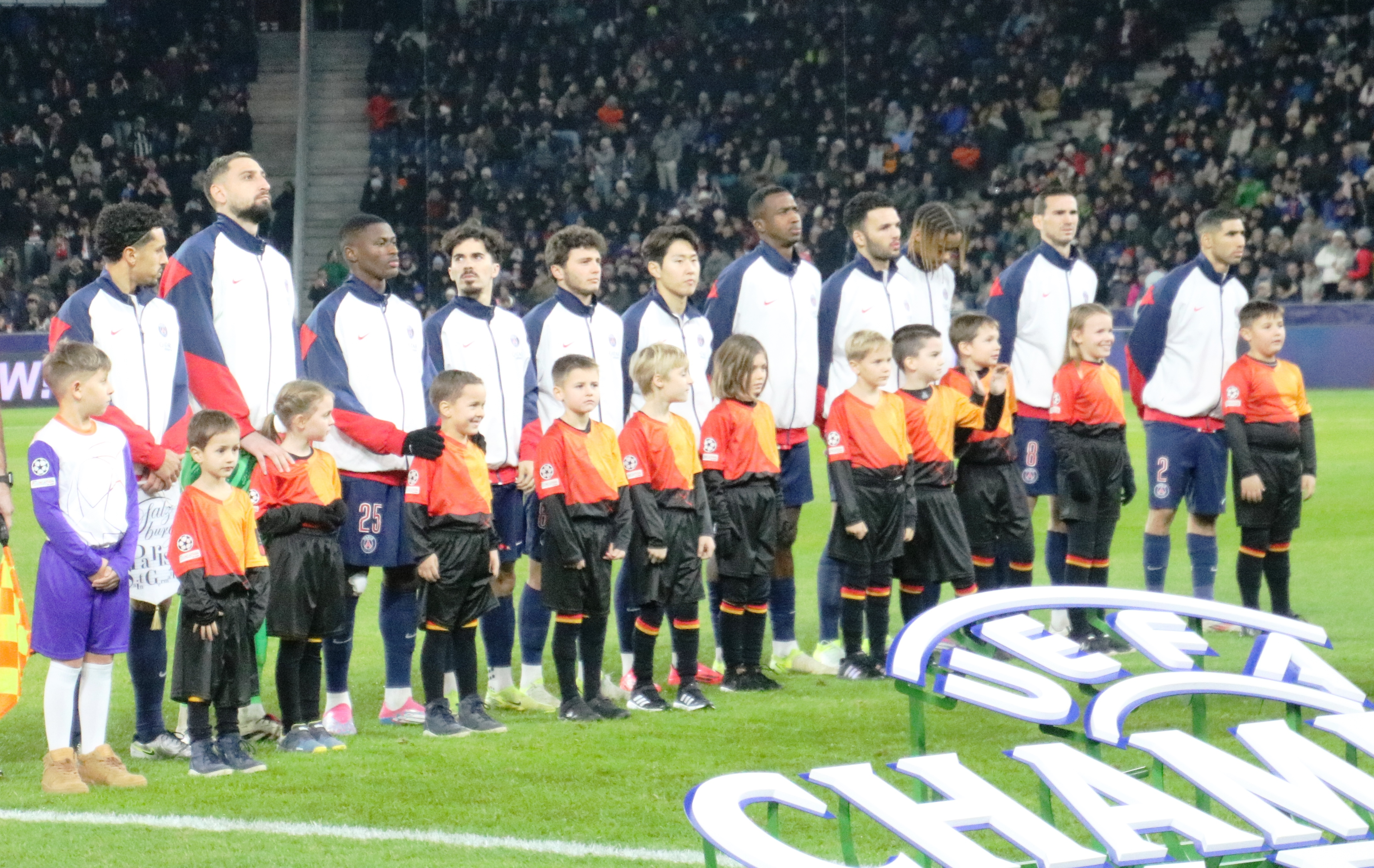
- Paris Saint-Germain players lining up before an away match against Red Bull Salzburg, 10 December 2024
- President: Nasser Al-Khelaifi
- Head coach: Luis Enrique
- Stadium: Parc des Princes
- Ligue 1: 1st
- Coupe de France: Winners
- Trophée des Champions: Winners
- UEFA Champions League: Winners
- FIFA Club World Cup: Runners-up
- Top goalscorer: League: Ousmane Dembélé (21); All: Ousmane Dembélé (35)
- Highest home attendance: 47,926 vs Nantes, Ligue 1, 30 November 2024 vs Lyon, Ligue 1, 15 December 2024 vs Monaco, Ligue 1, 7 February 2025 vs Marseille, Ligue 1, 16 March 2025 vs Auxerre, Ligue 1, 17 May 2025
- Lowest home attendance: 39,951 vs Girona, Champions League, 18 September 2024
- Average home league attendance: 47,430
- Biggest win: 7–0 vs Brest, Champions League, 19 February 2025; 7–0 vs Stade Briochin, Coupe de France, 26 February 2025
- Biggest defeat: 0–3 vs Chelsea, Club World Cup, 13 July 2025
Home colours	Away colours	Third colours

The 2024–25 season was the 55th season in the history of Paris Saint-Germain, and the club's 51st consecutive season in the French top flight. The club participated in Ligue 1, the Coupe de France, the Trophée des Champions, the UEFA Champions League, and the newly expanded FIFA Club World Cup for the first time.

This was the club's first season since 2016–17 without record goalscorer Kylian Mbappé, who left the Parisian side to join European champions Real Madrid, and the first since 2014–15 without Layvin Kurzawa, who also departed after his contract expired.

PSG achieved their best season in club history, securing the Ligue 1 and Coupe de France titles before defeating Inter Milan by a record 5–0 scoreline to become the second team from France to win the Champions League–after Marseille in 1993–as well as the first French side to win a continental treble.

== Players ==
=== First-team squad ===
As of 13 July 2025

Note: Flags indicate national team as defined under FIFA eligibility rules; some limited exceptions apply. Players may hold more than one non-FIFA nationality.

No.	Pos.	Nation	Player
1	GK	ITA	Gianluigi Donnarumma (vice-captain)
2	DF	MAR	Achraf Hakimi (vice-captain)
3	DF	FRA	Presnel Kimpembe (vice-captain)
4	DF	BRA	Lucas Beraldo
5	DF	BRA	Marquinhos (captain)
7	FW	GEO	Khvicha Kvaratskhelia
8	MF	ESP	Fabián Ruiz
9	FW	POR	Gonçalo Ramos
10	FW	FRA	Ousmane Dembélé
14	FW	FRA	Désiré Doué
17	MF	POR	Vitinha
19	MF	KOR	Lee Kang-in
20	MF	BRA	Gabriel Moscardo

No.	Pos.	Nation	Player
21	DF	FRA	Lucas Hernandez
24	MF	FRA	Senny Mayulu
25	DF	POR	Nuno Mendes
29	FW	FRA	Bradley Barcola
33	MF	FRA	Warren Zaïre-Emery
39	GK	RUS	Matvey Safonov
43	DF	FRA	Noham Kamara
49	FW	FRA	Ibrahim Mbaye
50	GK	FRA	Lucas Lavallée
51	DF	ECU	Willian Pacho
80	GK	ESP	Arnau Tenas
87	MF	POR	João Neves

=== Out on loan ===
Note: Flags indicate national team as defined under FIFA eligibility rules; some limited exceptions apply. Players may hold more than one non-FIFA nationality.

No.	Pos.	Nation	Player
—	DF	MAR	Naoufel El Hannach (at Montpellier until 30 June 2026)
—	DF	FRA	Yoram Zague (at Copenhagen until 30 June 2026)

No.	Pos.	Nation	Player
—	FW	FRA	Randal Kolo Muani (at Juventus until 15 July 2025)

=== Other players under contract ===
Note: Flags indicate national team as defined under FIFA eligibility rules; some limited exceptions apply. Players may hold more than one non-FIFA nationality.

No.	Pos.	Nation	Player
—	DF	FRA	Nordi Mukiele
—	DF	SVK	Milan Škriniar
—	MF	POR	Renato Sanches

No.	Pos.	Nation	Player
—	MF	ESP	Carlos Soler
—	FW	ESP	Marco Asensio
—	FW	MAR	Ilyes Housni

== Transfers ==
=== In ===
No.	Pos.	Player	Transferred from	Fee	Date	Source
39	GK	(Russia) Matvey Safonov	(Russia) Krasnodar	€20 million	14 June 2024	
87	MF	(Portugal) João Neves	(Portugal) Benfica	€59.9 million (Note: Up to €10 million in bonuses)	5 August 2024	
51	DF	(Ecuador) Willian Pacho	(Germany) Eintracht Frankfurt	€40 million (Note: Up to €5 million in bonuses)	9 August 2024	
14	MF	(France) Désiré Doué	(France) Rennes	€50 million (Note: €10 million to €20 million in bonuses)	17 August 2024	
7	FW	(Georgia (country)) Khvicha Kvaratskhelia	(Italy) Napoli	€70 million	17 January 2025	

=== Out ===
Pos.	Player	Transferred to	Fee	Date	Source
FW	(France) Hugo Ekitike	(Germany) Eintracht Frankfurt	€16.5 million	26 April 2024 (Note: Loan that was made permanent before the transfer window opened)	
FW	(France) Kylian Mbappé	(Spain) Real Madrid	Free	1 July 2024	
GK	(France) Alexandre Letellier	Released	Free	1 July 2024	
GK	(Costa Rica) Keylor Navas	Released	Free	1 July 2024	
GK	(Spain) Sergio Rico	Released (Note: On 29 September 2024, Rico joined Al-Gharafa.)	Free	1 July 2024	
DF	(France) Layvin Kurzawa	Released	Free	1 July 2024	
MF	(France) Ethan Mbappé	Released (Note: On 4 July 2024, Mbappé joined Lille.)	Free	1 July 2024	
FW	(Gabon) Noha Lemina	(France) Annecy	Undisclosed	30 July 2024	
MF	(Netherlands) Xavi Simons	(Germany) RB Leipzig	Loan	5 August 2024	
MF	(Portugal) Renato Sanches	(Portugal) Benfica	Loan (Note: Includes an option to sign permanently for €10 million)	5 August 2024	
DF	(France) Sékou Doucouré	(France) Nantes	Undisclosed	10 August 2024	
MF	(Italy) Cher Ndour	(Turkey) Beşiktaş	Loan	13 August 2024	
GK	(France) Lucas Lavallée	(France) Aubagne	Loan	20 August 2024	
MF	(Brazil) Gabriel Moscardo	(France) Reims	Loan	21 August 2024	
FW	(Morocco) Ilyes Housni	(France) Le Havre	Loan (Note: Includes an option to sign permanently for €2 million)	28 August 2024	
DF	(France) Nordi Mukiele	(Germany) Bayer Leverkusen	Loan	28 August 2024	
DF	(Spain) Juan Bernat	(Spain) Villarreal	Loan	30 August 2024	
MF	(Uruguay) Manuel Ugarte	(England) Manchester United	€50 million	30 August 2024	
MF	(Spain) Carlos Soler	(England) West Ham United	Loan	30 August 2024	
MF	(Spain) Ismaël Gharbi	(Portugal) Braga	Free	31 August 2024	
DF	(Portugal) Danilo Pereira	(Saudi Arabia) Al Ittihad	€5 million	2 September 2024	
DF	(France) Joane Gadou	(Austria) Red Bull Salzburg	€10 million	3 September 2024	
DF	(France) Colin Dagba	(Belgium) Beerschot	Free	5 September 2024	
DF	(Spain) Juan Bernat	(Spain) Villarreal	Free	22 January 2025	
FW	(France) Randal Kolo Muani	(Italy) Juventus	Loan (Note: €1 million loan fee with €2.6 million in additional costs, plus up to €2 million in bonuses)	23 January 2025	
MF	(Netherlands) Xavi Simons	(Germany) RB Leipzig	€50 million (Note: Up to €31 million in bonuses)	30 January 2025	
DF	(Slovakia) Milan Škriniar	(Turkey) Fenerbahçe	Loan	30 January 2025	
MF	(Italy) Cher Ndour	(Italy) Fiorentina	€5 million	3 February 2025	
MF	(Spain) Marco Asensio	(England) Aston Villa	Loan	3 February 2025	
DF	(France) Yoram Zague	(Denmark) Copenhagen	Loan (Note: Includes an option to sign permanently)	24 June 2025	
DF	(Morocco) Naoufel El Hannach	(France) Montpellier	Loan	26 June 2025	
DF	(France) Axel Tape	(Germany) Bayer Leverkusen	Free	1 July 2025	
GK	(Portugal) Louis Mouquet	Released (Note: On 14 August 2025, Mouquet signed for Padova.)	Free	1 July 2025	
DF	(France) Vimoj Muntu Wa Mungu	Released (Note: On 7 July 2025, Muntu Wa Mungu signed for Guingamp.)	Free	1 July 2025	
MF	(France) Ayman Kari	Released	Free	1 July 2025	

== Pre-season and friendlies ==
Win Draw Loss Fixtures

7 August 2024 Friendly	Sturm Graz	2–2	Paris Saint-Germain	Klagenfurt, Austria
18:30 CEST (UTC+2)	Camara 15'; Kiteishvili 43'	Report	Mbaye 9'; Soler 12'	Stadium: Wörthersee Stadion; Attendance: 19,600; Referee: Stefan Ebner (Austria)

10 August 2024 Friendly	RB Leipzig	1–1	Paris Saint-Germain	Leipzig, Germany
18:00 CEST (UTC+2)	Openda 13'	Report	Ramos 70'; Soler (yellow card) 81'	Stadium: Red Bull Arena; Attendance: 40,365; Referee: Richard Hempel (Germany)

== Competitions ==
=== Overall record ===
Competition	First match	Last match	Starting round	Final position	Record							
Competition	First match	Last match	Starting round	Final position	Pld	W	D	L	GF	GA	GD	Win %
Ligue 1	16 August 2024	17 May 2025	Matchday 1	Winners	34	26	6	2	92	35	+57	76.47
Coupe de France	22 December 2024	24 May 2025	Round of 64	Winners	6	5	1	0	21	5	+16	83.33
Trophée des Champions	5 January 2025		Final	Winners	1	1	0	0	1	0	+1	100.00
UEFA Champions League	18 September 2024	31 May 2025	League phase	Winners	17	11	1	5	38	15	+23	64.71
FIFA Club World Cup	15 June 2025	13 July 2025	Group stage	Runners-up	7	5	0	2	16	4	+12	71.43
Total					65	48	8	9	168	59	+109	73.85

Source: Soccerway

=== Ligue 1 ===
==== League table ====
Pos	Team	Pld	W	D	L	GF	GA	GD	Pts	Qualification or relegation
1	Paris Saint-Germain (C)	34	26	6	2	92	35	+57	84	Qualification for the Champions League league phase
2	Marseille	34	20	5	9	74	47	+27	65	Qualification for the Champions League league phase
3	Monaco	34	18	7	9	63	41	+22	61	Qualification for the Champions League league phase
4	Nice	34	17	9	8	66	41	+25	60	Qualification for the Champions League third qualifying round
5	Lille	34	17	9	8	52	36	+16	60	Qualification for the Europa League league phase (Note: Since the 2024–25 Coupe de France winners, Paris Saint-Germain, qualified for the Champions League via league position, the Europa League berth awarded to the cup winners was passed to the sixth-placed team and the Conference League berth was passed to the seventh-placed team.)

Source: Ligue 1
Rules for classification: 1) Points; 2) Goal difference; 3) Head-to-head points; 4) Head-to-head goal difference; 5) Head-to-head goals scored; 6) Head-to-head away goals scored; 7) Goals scored; 8) Away goals scored; 9) Fair-play points (Note: Head-to-head record is used only after all the matches between the teams in question have been played).
(C) Champions

==== Results summary ====
Overall								Home						Away					
Pld	W	D	L	GF	GA	GD	Pts	W	D	L	GF	GA	GD	W	D	L	GF	GA	GD
34	26	6	2	92	35	+57	84	14	2	1	45	16	+29	12	4	1	47	19	+28

Source: Ligue 1

==== Results by round ====
Round	1	2	3	4	5	6	7	8	9	10	11	12	13	14	15	16	17	18	19	20	21	22	23	24	25	26	27	28	30	29^{1}	31	32	33	34
Ground	A	H	A	H	A	H	A	H	A	H	A	H	H	A	H	A	H	A	H	A	H	A	A	H	A	H	A	H	H	A	H	A	A	H
Result	W	W	W	W	D	W	D	W	W	W	W	W	D	D	W	W	W	W	D	W	W	W	W	W	W	W	W	W	W	D	L	L	W	W
Position	2	1	1	1	1	1	2	1	1	1	1	1	1	1	1	1	1	1	1	1	1	1	1	1	1	1	1	1	1	1	1	1	1	1

Source: Ligue 1
A = Away; H = Home; W = Win; D = Draw; L = Loss

^{1} Matchday 29 (vs Nantes) was postponed due to Paris Saint-Germain's involvement in the UEFA Champions League.

==== Matches ====
The league fixtures were announced on 21 June 2024.

16 August 2024 1	Le Havre	1–4	Paris Saint-Germain	Le Havre
20:45 CEST (UTC+2)	Youte Kinkoue (yellow card) 15'; Joujou (yellow card) 45+3'; Lloris 48', (yellow card) 88'	Report	Lee 3'; Dembelé 84'; Barcola 86'; Kolo Muani 90' (pen.)	Stadium: Stade Océane; Attendance: 23,167; Referee: Willy Delajod

23 August 2024 2	Paris Saint-Germain	6–0	Montpellier	Paris
20:45 CEST (UTC+2)	Barcola 4', 53'; Asensio 24'; Dembélé (yellow card) 55'; Hakimi 58'; Zaïre-Emery 60'; Lee 82'	Report	Sacko (yellow card) 33'; Chotard (yellow card) 45+1'; Kouyaté (yellow card) 50'; Khazri (yellow card) 57'	Stadium: Parc des Princes; Attendance: 46,000; Referee: Marc Bollengier

1 September 2024 3	Lille	1–3	Paris Saint-Germain	Villeneuve-d'Ascq
20:45 CEST (UTC+2)	Alexsandro (yellow card) 31'; Mukau (yellow card) 47'; Zhegrova 78'; Diakité (yellow card) 90+1'	Report	Beraldo (yellow card) 24'; Vitinha 33' (pen.); Barcola 36'; Donnarumma (yellow card) 84'; Kolo Muani 90+2'	Stadium: Stade Pierre-Mauroy; Attendance: 45,434; Referee: Benoît Bastien

14 September 2024 4	Paris Saint-Germain	3–1	Brest	Paris
21:00 CEST (UTC+2)	Beraldo (yellow card) 26'; Mendes (yellow card) 28'; Dembelé 42', 74'; Fabián 73'	Report	Del Castillo 29' (pen.); Camara (yellow card) 39'; Ajorque (yellow card) 49'; Chardonnet (yellow card) 59'	Stadium: Parc des Princes; Attendance: 47,000; Referee: Clément Turpin

21 September 2024 5	Reims	1–1	Paris Saint-Germain	Reims
21:00 CEST (UTC+2)	Nakamura 9'; Munetsi (yellow card) 44'; Fofana (yellow card) 47'	Report	Pacho (yellow card) 37'; Dembelé 68'	Stadium: Stade Auguste-Delaune; Attendance: 20,220; Referee: Jérémie Pignard

27 September 2024 6	Paris Saint-Germain	3–1	Rennes	Paris
21:00 CEST (UTC+2)	Barcola 30', 68'; Dembelé (yellow card) 47'; Zaïre-Emery (yellow card) 52'; Lee 58'	Report	Santamaria (yellow card) 31'; Assignon (yellow card) 42'; Wooh (yellow card) 65'; Kalimuendo 75' (pen.)	Stadium: Parc des Princes; Attendance: 47,582; Referee: Hakim Ben El Hadj

6 October 2024 7	Nice	1–1	Paris Saint-Germain	Nice
20:45 CEST (UTC+2)	Abdi 39'; Boudaoui (yellow card) 71'	Report	Hakimi (yellow card) 36'; Marquinhos (yellow card) 36'; Bombito 52' (o.g.)	Stadium: Allianz Riviera; Attendance: 30,247; Referee: Jérôme Brisard

19 October 2024 8	Paris Saint-Germain	4–2	Strasbourg	Paris
21:00 CEST (UTC+2)	Mayulu 18'; Asensio 47'; Beraldo (yellow card) 60'; Barcola 66'; Lee 90'; Škriniar (yellow card) 90+7'	Report	Senaya (yellow card) 10'; Mara 58'; Sow (yellow card) 72'; Diong 90+2'	Stadium: Parc des Princes; Attendance: 47,590; Referee: Jérémy Stinat

27 October 2024 9	Marseille	0–3	Paris Saint-Germain	Marseille
20:45 CET (UTC+1)	Højbjerg (yellow card) 18'; Harit (red card) 20'	Report	Neves 26'; Balerdi 29' (o.g.); Barcola 40'	Stadium: Stade Vélodrome; Attendance: 66,115; Referee: François Letexier

2 November 2024 10	Paris Saint-Germain	1–0	Lens	Paris
17:00 CET (UTC+1)	Dembelé 4'; Marquinhos (yellow card) 57'	Report	Khusanov (yellow card) 45+1', (red card) 59'; Gradit (yellow card) 47'; Diouf (yellow card) 62'; Danso (yellow card) 86'	Stadium: Parc des Princes; Attendance: 47,889; Referee: Willy Delajod

9 November 2024 11	Angers	2–4	Paris Saint-Germain	Angers
21:00 CET (UTC+1)	Lepaul 90+1'; Biumla 90+7'	Report	Lee 17', 20'; Beraldo (yellow card) 24'; Barcola 31', 45+2'; Zaïre-Emery (yellow card) 59'; Marquinhos (yellow card) 82'	Stadium: Stade Raymond Kopa; Attendance: 17,212; Referee: Benoît Millot

22 November 2024 12	Paris Saint-Germain	3–0	Toulouse	Paris
21:00 CET (UTC+1)	Neves 35'; Hakimi (yellow card) 44'; Beraldo 84'; Vitinha 90+1'	Report	Aboukhlal (yellow card) 43'; Dønnum (yellow card) 75'	Stadium: Parc des Princes; Attendance: 47,826; Referee: Gaël Angoula

30 November 2024 13	Paris Saint-Germain	1–1	Nantes	Paris
21:00 CET (UTC+1)	Hakimi 2'	Report	Abline 38'	Stadium: Parc des Princes; Attendance: 47,926; Referee: Jérémy Stinat

6 December 2024 14	Auxerre	0–0	Paris Saint-Germain	Auxerre
21:00 CET (UTC+1)	Traorè (yellow card) 73'; Sinayoko (yellow card) 76'	Report	Pacho (yellow card) 85'	Stadium: Stade de l'Abbé-Deschamps; Attendance: 17,028; Referee: Jérémie Pignard

15 December 2024 15	Paris Saint-Germain	3–1	Lyon	Paris
20:45 CET (UTC+1)	Dembélé 8'; Vitinha 14' (pen.); Lee (yellow card) 15'; Donnarumma (yellow card) 41'; Ramos 88'	Report	Mikautadze 40', (yellow card) 41'; Veretout (yellow card) 45+2'; Tagliafico (yellow card) 90+2'	Stadium: Parc des Princes; Attendance: 47,926; Referee: Benoît Bastien

18 December 2024 16	Monaco	2–4	Paris Saint-Germain	Monaco
21:00 CET (UTC+1)	Singo (yellow card) 13'; Camara (yellow card) 29'; Ben Seghir 53' (pen.); Embolo 60'	Report	Doué 24'; Dembélé 64', 90+7'; Ramos 83'	Stadium: Stade Louis II; Attendance: 12,095; Referee: François Letexier

12 January 2025 17	Paris Saint-Germain	2–1	Saint-Étienne	Paris
20:45 CET (UTC+1)	Dembelé 13', 23' (pen.); Beraldo (yellow card) 65'	Report	Mouton (yellow card) 59'; Davitashvili 64'; Bouchouari (yellow card) 76'	Stadium: Parc des Princes; Attendance: 47,580; Referee: Mathieu Vernice

18 January 2025 18	Lens	1–2	Paris Saint-Germain	Lens
17:00 CET (UTC+1)	Nzola 36'; Machado (yellow card) 45'; Thomasson (yellow card) 62'	Report	Vitinha (yellow card) 29'; Fabián 59'; Barcola 86'; Mayulu (yellow card) 90'	Stadium: Stade Bollaert-Delelis; Attendance: 38,120; Referee: Jérémie Pignard

25 January 2025 19	Paris Saint-Germain	1–1	Reims	Paris
21:00 CET (UTC+1)	Hernandez (yellow card) 35'; Dembélé 47'; Barcola (yellow card) 90+2'	Report	Akieme (yellow card) 4'; Nakamura 56'; Diakhon (yellow card) 85'	Stadium: Parc des Princes; Attendance: 47,862; Referee: Hakim Ben El Hadj

1 February 2025 20	Brest	2–5	Paris Saint-Germain	Brest
17:00 CET (UTC+1)	Sima (yellow card) 36'; Del Castillo 50'; Ajorque 71'	Report	Dembélé 29', 57', 62'; Ramos 89', 90+7'	Stadium: Stade Francis-Le Blé; Attendance: 15,040; Referee: Benoît Bastien

7 February 2025 21	Paris Saint-Germain	4–1	Monaco	Paris
21:05 CET (UTC+1)	Vitinha 6'; Doué (yellow card) 28'; Kvaratskhelia 54'; Dembélé 57', 90'	Report	Zakaria 17'	Stadium: Parc des Princes; Attendance: 47,926; Referee: Clément Turpin

15 February 2025 22	Toulouse	0–1	Paris Saint-Germain	Toulouse
21:05 CET (UTC+1)	Sierro (yellow card) 39'; Akdağ (yellow card) 56'	Report	Fabián 52'	Stadium: Stadium de Toulouse; Attendance: 31,703; Referee: Willy Delajod

23 February 2025 23	Lyon	2–3	Paris Saint-Germain	Décines-Charpieu
20:45 CET (UTC+1)	Cherki 83'; Almada (yellow card) 85'; Tolisso 90+2'	Report	Hakimi (yellow card) 36', (goal) 53', 85'; Dembélé 59'	Stadium: Parc Olympique Lyonnais; Attendance: 57,777; Referee: Eric Wattellier

1 March 2025 24	Paris Saint-Germain	4–1	Lille	Paris
21:05 CET (UTC+1)	Barcola 6'; Marquinhos 22'; Dembélé 28'; Doué 37'	Report	Meunier (yellow card) 39'; David 80'; Ismaily (yellow card) 90+2'	Stadium: Parc des Princes; Attendance: 47,838; Referee: François Letexier

8 March 2025 25	Rennes	1–4	Paris Saint-Germain	Rennes
17:00 CET (UTC+1)	Samba (yellow card) 34'; Brassier 53'; Rouault (yellow card) 58'	Report	Barcola 27', (yellow card) 45+2'; Hernandez (yellow card) 36'; Ramos 50'; Dembélé 90+1', 90+4'; Hakimi (yellow card) 90+7'	Stadium: Roazhon Park; Attendance: 28,550; Referee: Mathieu Vernice

16 March 2025 26	Paris Saint-Germain	3–1	Marseille	Paris
20:45 CET (UTC+1)	Dembélé 17'; Mendes (yellow card) 26', (goal) 42'; Lirola 76' (o.g.)	Report	Gouiri 51'	Stadium: Parc des Princes; Attendance: 47,926; Referee: Clément Turpin

29 March 2025 27	Saint-Étienne	1–6	Paris Saint-Germain	Saint-Étienne
19:00 CET (UTC+1)	Stassin 9'; Bouchouari (yellow card) 26'; Maçon (yellow card) 68'	Report	Ramos 43' (pen.); Kvaratskhelia 50'; Doué 53', 66'; Neves 62'; Mbaye 90'	Stadium: Stade Geoffroy-Guichard; Attendance: 37,108; Referee: Jérémy Stinat

5 April 2025 28	Paris Saint-Germain	1–0	Angers	Paris
17:00 CEST (UTC+2)	Doué 55'	Report	Hanin (yellow card) 14'; Ekomié (yellow card) 21'; Lepaul (yellow card) 42'	Stadium: Parc des Princes; Attendance: 47,736; Referee: Marc Bollengier

19 April 2025 30	Paris Saint-Germain	2–1	Le Havre	Paris
17:00 CEST (UTC+2)	Doué 8'; Ramos 50'	Report	Soumaré 60'	Stadium: Parc des Princes; Attendance: 47,113; Referee: Mathieu Vernice

22 April 2025 29	Nantes	1–1	Paris Saint-Germain	Nantes
20:45 CEST (UTC+2)	Castelletto (yellow card) 77'; Chirivella (yellow card) 79'; Douglas Augusto 83'	Report	Vitinha 33'	Stadium: Stade de la Beaujoire; Attendance: 34,420; Referee: Jérémie Pignard
Note: The match was originally scheduled for 13 April 2025, but was postponed due to Paris Saint-Germain's involvement in the UEFA Champions League.

25 April 2025 31	Paris Saint-Germain	1–3	Nice	Paris
20:45 CEST (UTC+2)	Fabián 41'; Neves (yellow card) 45+2'; Mendes (yellow card) 68'; Zaïre-Emery (yellow card) 72'	Report	Sanson 34', 46'; Abdi (yellow card) 43'; Ndayishimiye 70'	Stadium: Parc des Princes; Attendance: 47,597; Referee: Willy Delajod

3 May 2025 32	Strasbourg	2–1	Paris Saint-Germain	Strasbourg
17:00 CEST (UTC+2)	Hernandez 20' (o.g.); Lemaréchal 45+3'; Doué (yellow card) 86'	Report	Barcola 46'; Tape (yellow card) 83'; Fabián (yellow card) 89'	Stadium: Stade de la Meinau; Attendance: 19,522; Referee: Hakim Ben El Hadj

10 May 2025 33	Montpellier	1–4	Paris Saint-Germain	Montpellier
21:00 CEST (UTC+2)	Ferri (yellow card) 42'; Coulibaly 64'	Report	Beraldo (yellow card) 39'; Mayulu 44'; Ramos 49', 59' (pen.), 65'	Stadium: Stade de la Mosson; Attendance: 16,787; Referee: Mathieu Vernice

17 May 2025 34	Paris Saint-Germain	3–1	Auxerre	Paris
21:00 CEST (UTC+2)	Kvaratskhelia 59', 88'; Marquinhos 67'; Ramos (penalty missed) 80', (yellow card) 86'	Report	Sinayoko 30'; Perrin (yellow card) 34'; Diomandé (yellow card) 77'	Stadium: Parc des Princes; Attendance: 47,926; Referee: Abdelatif Kherradji

=== Coupe de France ===
22 December 2024 Round of 64	Lens	1–1 (3–4 p)	Paris Saint-Germain	Lens
21:00 CET (UTC+1)	Nzola 66'; Khusanov (yellow card) 75'	Report	Marquinhos (yellow card) 67'; Ramos 70'	Stadium: Stade Bollaert-Delelis; Attendance: 38,182; Referee: Thomas Léonard
	Penalties
	Frankowski (penalty scored); Sotoca (penalty scored); El Aynaoui (penalty scored); Nzola (penalty missed); Diouf (penalty missed)		(penalty scored) Vitinha; (penalty scored) Ramos; (penalty scored) Dembélé; (penalty scored) Barcola

15 January 2025 Round of 32	Espaly	2–4	Paris Saint-Germain	Clermont-Ferrand
21:00 CET (UTC+1)	Gjeçi 3'; Fournel 71'; Uzun (yellow card) 90+4'	Report	Zaïre-Emery 37'; Doué 67'; Barcola 88'; Neves (yellow card) 90'; Ramos 90+2' (pen.)	Stadium: Stade Marcel-Michelin; Attendance: 12,939; Referee: Marc Bollengier

4 February 2025 Round of 16	Le Mans	0–2	Paris Saint-Germain	Le Mans
21:10 CET (UTC+1)	Bernardeau (yellow card) 5'; Lauray (yellow card) 32'	Report	Doué 25'; Mayulu (yellow card) 45+2'; Barcola 71'; Kimpembe (yellow card) 84'; Ramos (yellow card) 87'	Stadium: Stade Marie-Marvingt; Attendance: 24,254; Referee: Abdelatif Kherradji

26 February 2025 Quarter-finals	Stade Briochin	0–7	Paris Saint-Germain	Rennes
21:10 CET (UTC+1)		Report	Neves 16'; Ramos 36', 49' (pen.), 58'; Doué 55'; Mayulu 66'; Dembélé 85'	Stadium: Roazhon Park; Attendance: 25,915; Referee: Thomas Léonard

1 April 2025 Semi-finals	Dunkerque	2–4	Paris Saint-Germain	Villeneuve-d'Ascq
21:10 CEST (UTC+2)	Sasso 7'; Al-Saad 27'	Report	Dembélé 45', 90+3'; Marquinhos 48'; Doué 62'; Beraldo (yellow card) 81'	Stadium: Stade Pierre-Mauroy; Attendance: 45,419; Referee: Jérôme Brisard

24 May 2025 Final	Paris Saint-Germain	3–0	Reims	Saint-Denis
21:00 CEST (UTC+2)	Barcola 16', 19'; Hakimi 43'	Report		Stadium: Stade de France; Attendance: 77,101; Referee: Benoît Bastien

=== Trophée des Champions ===
5 January 2025 Final	Paris Saint-Germain	1–0	Monaco	Doha, Qatar
19:30 AST (UTC+3)	Mendes (yellow card) 23'; Barcola (yellow card) 87'; Dembélé 90+2'	Report	Vanderson (yellow card) 35'	Stadium: Stadium 974; Attendance: 39,682; Referee: Willy Delajod

=== UEFA Champions League ===
==== League phase ====
The draw for the league phase was held on 29 August 2024.

Pos	Team	Pld	W	D	L	GF	GA	GD	Pts	Qualification
13	(Italian Football Federation) Milan	8	5	0	3	14	11	+3	15	Advance to knockout phase play-offs (seeded)
14	(Royal Dutch Football Association) PSV Eindhoven	8	4	2	2	16	12	+4	14	Advance to knockout phase play-offs (seeded)
15	(French Football Federation) Paris Saint-Germain	8	4	1	3	14	9	+5	13	Advance to knockout phase play-offs (seeded)
16	(Portuguese Football Federation) Benfica	8	4	1	3	16	12	+4	13	Advance to knockout phase play-offs (seeded)
17	(French Football Federation) Monaco	8	4	1	3	13	13	0	13	Advance to knockout phase play-offs (unseeded)

Source: UEFA
Rules for classification: League phase tiebreakers

Round	1	2	3	4	5	6	7	8
Ground	H	A	H	H	A	A	H	A
Result	W	L	D	L	L	W	W	W
Position	15	18	19	25	25	25	22	15

Source: UEFA
A = Away; H = Home; W = Win; D = Draw; L = Loss

18 September 2024 1	Paris Saint-Germain (France)	1–0	(Spain) Girona	Paris, France
21:00 CEST (UTC+2)	Marquinhos (yellow card) 17'; Gazzaniga 90' (o.g.)	Report	Krejčí (yellow card) 20'; Romeu (yellow card) 43'; Gazzaniga (yellow card) 74'	Stadium: Parc des Princes; Attendance: 39,951; Referee: Daniel Siebert (Germany)

1 October 2024 2	Arsenal (England)	2–0	(France) Paris Saint-Germain	London, England
20:00 BST (UTC+1)	Havertz 20'; Saka 35'; Calafiori (yellow card) 76'	Report	Fabián (yellow card) 76'	Stadium: Emirates Stadium; Attendance: 60,103; Referee: Slavko Vinčić (Slovenia)

22 October 2024 3	Paris Saint-Germain (France)	1–1	(Netherlands) PSV Eindhoven	Paris, France
21:00 CEST (UTC+2)	Mendes (yellow card) 40'; Hakimi 55'	Report	Lang 34'; Mauro Júnior (yellow card) 45+2'; Dams (yellow card) 77'; Ledezma (yellow card) 90+1'; Babadi (yellow card) 90+2'; Benítez (yellow card) 90+6'	Stadium: Parc des Princes; Attendance: 47,511; Referee: Glenn Nyberg (Sweden)

6 November 2024 4	Paris Saint-Germain (France)	1–2	(Spain) Atlético Madrid	Paris, France
21:00 CET (UTC+1)	Zaïre-Emery 14'	Report	Molina 18'; Correa (yellow card) 87', (goal) 90+3'	Stadium: Parc des Princes; Attendance: 47,369; Referee: Szymon Marciniak (Poland)

26 November 2024 5	Bayern Munich (Germany)	1–0	(France) Paris Saint-Germain	Munich, Germany
21:00 CET (UTC+1)	Kim 38'; Coman (yellow card) 67'; Olise (yellow card) 77'; Gnabry (yellow card) 84'	Report	Dembélé (yellow card) 37' (yellow-red card) 57'; Hakimi (yellow card) 57'; Mendes (yellow card) 71'; Fabián (yellow card) 90+5'	Stadium: Allianz Arena; Attendance: 75,000; Referee: István Kovács (Romania)

10 December 2024 6	Red Bull Salzburg (Austria)	0–3	(France) Paris Saint-Germain	Salzburg, Austria
21:00 CET (UTC+1)	Guindo (yellow card) 35'; Gourna-Douath (yellow card) 53'; Capaldo (yellow card) 75'	Report	Ramos 30'; Mendes 72'; Doué 85'	Stadium: Red Bull Arena; Attendance: 25,065; Referee: Michael Oliver (England)

22 January 2025 7	Paris Saint-Germain (France)	4–2	(England) Manchester City	Paris, France
21:00 CET (UTC+1)	Mendes (yellow card) 23'; Dembélé 56'; Barcola 60'; Neves 78'; Ramos 90+3'	Report	Dias (yellow card) 9'; Grealish 50'; Haaland 53'	Stadium: Parc des Princes; Attendance: 47,818; Referee: Szymon Marciniak (Poland)

29 January 2025 8	VfB Stuttgart (Germany)	1–4	(France) Paris Saint-Germain	Stuttgart, Germany
21:00 CET (UTC+1)	Stiller (yellow card) 53'; Karazor (yellow card) 70'; Pacho 77' (o.g.)	Report	Barcola 6'; Dembélé 17', 35', 54'; Neves (yellow card) 66'	Stadium: MHPArena; Attendance: 60,000; Referee: Davide Massa (Italy)

==== Knockout phase ====
===== Knockout phase play-offs =====
The draw for the knockout phase play-offs was held on 31 January 2025.

11 February 2025 First leg	Brest (France)	0–3	(France) Paris Saint-Germain	Guingamp, France
18:45 CET (UTC+1)	Chardonnet (yellow card) 74'	Report	Vitinha 21' (pen.); Dembélé 45', 66'; Barcola (yellow card) 70'	Stadium: Stade de Roudourou; Attendance: 15,831; Referee: Irfan Peljto (Bosnia and Herzegovina)
Note: The match was played at Stade de Roudourou in Guingamp, instead of Brest's regular stadium, Stade Francis-Le Blé in Brest, which did not meet UEFA requirements.

19 February 2025 Second leg	Paris Saint-Germain (France)	7–0 (10–0 agg.)	(France) Brest	Paris, France
21:00 CET (UTC+1)	Barcola 20'; Kvaratskhelia 39'; Vitinha 59'; Doué 64'; Mendes 69'; Ramos 76'; Mayulu 86'	Report	Haïdara (yellow card) 67'; Le Cardinal (yellow card) 80'	Stadium: Parc des Princes; Attendance: 47,211; Referee: Michael Oliver (England)

===== Round of 16 =====
The draw for the round of 16 was held on 21 February 2025.

5 March 2025 First leg	Paris Saint-Germain (France)	0–1	(England) Liverpool	Paris, France
21:00 CET (UTC+1)	Marquinhos (yellow card) 38'	Report	Van Dijk (yellow card) 70'; Elliott 87'	Stadium: Parc des Princes; Attendance: 47,511; Referee: Davide Massa (Italy)

11 March 2025 Second leg	Liverpool (England)	0–1 (a.e.t.) (1–1 agg.) (1–4 p)	(France) Paris Saint-Germain	Liverpool, England
20:00 GMT (UTC±0)	Mac Allister (yellow card) 90+2'	Report	Dembélé 12'; Marquinhos (yellow card) 46'	Stadium: Anfield; Attendance: 59,765; Referee: István Kovács (Romania)
	Penalties
	Salah (penalty scored); Núñez (penalty missed); Jones (penalty missed)		(penalty scored) Vitinha; (penalty scored) Ramos; (penalty scored) Dembélé; (penalty scored) Doué

===== Quarter-finals =====
The draw for the order of the quarter-final legs was held on 21 February 2025, after the draw for the round of 16.

9 April 2025 First leg	Paris Saint-Germain (France)	3–1	(England) Aston Villa	Paris, France
21:00 CEST (UTC+2)	Doué 39'; Kvaratskhelia 49'; Mendes 90+2'	Report	Cash (yellow card) 17'; Rogers 35'	Stadium: Parc des Princes; Attendance: 47,681; Referee: Maurizio Mariani (Italy)

15 April 2025 Second leg	Aston Villa (England)	3–2 (4–5 agg.)	(France) Paris Saint-Germain	Birmingham, England
20:00 BST (UTC+1)	Tielemans 34'; McGinn (yellow card) 42', (goal) 55'; Konsa 57'	Report	Hakimi 11'; Mendes 27'	Stadium: Villa Park; Attendance: 42,535; Referee: José María Sánchez Martínez (Spain)

===== Semi-finals =====
The draw for the order of the semi-final legs was held on 21 February 2025, after the draw for the round of 16 and quarter-finals.

29 April 2025 First leg	Arsenal (England)	0–1	(France) Paris Saint-Germain	London, England
20:00 BST (UTC+1)	Trossard (yellow card) 10'; Saka (yellow card) 43'	Report	Dembélé 4'; Hakimi (yellow card) 44'; Neves (yellow card) 46'	Stadium: Emirates Stadium; Attendance: 59,664; Referee: Slavko Vinčić (Slovenia)

7 May 2025 Second leg	Paris Saint-Germain (France)	2–1 (3–1 agg.)	(England) Arsenal	Paris, France
21:00 CEST (UTC+2)	Mendes (yellow card) 18'; Fabián 27'; Vitinha (penalty missed) 69'; Hakimi 72'; Kvaratskhelia (yellow card) 86'	Report	Rice (yellow card) 26'; Lewis-Skelly (yellow card) 56'; Saka 76', (yellow card) 86'; Calafiori (yellow card) 86'	Stadium: Parc des Princes; Attendance: 47,511; Referee: Felix Zwayer (Germany)

===== Final =====
31 May 2025 Final	Paris Saint-Germain (France)	5–0	(Italy) Inter Milan	Munich, Germany
21:00 CEST (UTC+2)	Hakimi 12', (yellow card) 90'; Doué 20', 63', (yellow card) 65'; Kvaratskhelia 73'; Mayulu 86'	Report	Zalewski (yellow card) 56'; Thuram (yellow card) 69'; Acerbi (yellow card) 71'	Stadium: Allianz Arena; Attendance: 64,327; Referee: István Kovács (Romania)

=== FIFA Club World Cup ===
==== Group stage ====
The draw for the group stage was held on 5 December 2024.

Pos	Team	Pld	W	D	L	GF	GA	GD	Pts	Qualification
1	(France) Paris Saint-Germain	3	2	0	1	6	1	+5	6 (Note: Tied on head-to-head points (3). Head-to-head goal difference: Paris Saint-Germain +3, Botafogo 0, Atlético Madrid –3.)	Advance to knockout stage
2	(Brazil) Botafogo	3	2	0	1	3	2	+1	6	Advance to knockout stage
3	(Spain) Atlético Madrid	3	2	0	1	4	5	−1	6	
4	(United States) Seattle Sounders FC	3	0	0	3	2	7	−5	0	

Source: FIFA
Rules for classification: Group stage tiebreakers
Notes:

15 June 2025 1	Paris Saint-Germain (France)	4–0	(Spain) Atlético Madrid	Pasadena, United States
12:00 PDT (UTC−7)	Fabián 19', (yellow card) 28'; Vitinha 45+1'; Marquinhos (yellow card) 62'; Mayulu 87'; Lee 90+7' (pen.)	Report	Lenglet (yellow card) 20' (yellow-red card) 78'; Le Normand (yellow card) 25'; Simeone (yellow card) 29'; Koke (yellow card) 48'; Correa (yellow card) 63'; Mandava (yellow card) 64'	Stadium: Rose Bowl; Attendance: 80,619; Referee: István Kovács (Romania)

19 June 2025 2	Paris Saint-Germain (France)	0–1	(Brazil) Botafogo	Pasadena, United States
18:00 PDT (UTC−7)		Report	Igor Jesus 36'; Gregore (yellow card) 57'; Cuiabano (yellow card) 89'	Stadium: Rose Bowl; Attendance: 53,699; Referee: Drew Fischer (Canada)

23 June 2025 3	Seattle Sounders FC (United States)	0–2	(France) Paris Saint-Germain	Seattle, United States
12:00 PDT (UTC−7)		Report	Kvaratskhelia 35'; Neves (yellow card) 44'; Hakimi 66'	Stadium: Lumen Field; Attendance: 50,628; Referee: Cristián Garay (Chile)

==== Knockout stage ====
29 June 2025 Round of 16	Paris Saint-Germain (France)	4–0	(United States) Inter Miami CF	Atlanta, United States
12:00 EDT (UTC−4)	Neves 6', 39'; Avilés 44' (o.g.); Hakimi 45+3'	Report	Avilés (yellow card) 20'; Weigandt (yellow card) 42'; Suárez (yellow card) 74'	Stadium: Mercedes-Benz Stadium; Attendance: 65,574; Referee: Wilton Sampaio (Brazil)

5 July 2025 Quarter-finals	Paris Saint-Germain (France)	2–0	(Germany) Bayern Munich	Atlanta, United States
12:00 EDT (UTC−4)	Doué (yellow card) 76', (goal) 78'; Pacho (red card) 82'; Hernández (red card) 90+2'; Dembélé 90+6'	Report	Laimer (yellow card) 68'	Stadium: Mercedes-Benz Stadium; Attendance: 66,937; Referee: Anthony Taylor (England)

9 July 2025 Semi-finals	Paris Saint-Germain (France)	4–0	(Spain) Real Madrid	East Rutherford, United States
15:10 EDT (UTC−4)	Fabián 6', 24'; Dembélé 9'; Neves (yellow card) 45+2'; Ramos 87'	Report	Tchouaméni (yellow card) 28'; Carvajal (yellow card) 73'	Stadium: MetLife Stadium; Attendance: 77,542; Referee: Szymon Marciniak (Poland)
Note: The match was originally scheduled for 15:00 EDT, but was delayed by ten minutes due to the late arrival of the team buses.

13 July 2025 Final	Chelsea (England)	3–0	(France) Paris Saint-Germain	East Rutherford, United States
15:00 EDT (UTC−4)	Palmer 22', 30'; Neto (yellow card) 34'; Caicedo (yellow card) 36'; Gusto (yellow card) 40'; João Pedro 43'; Colwill (yellow card) 81'	Report	Neves (red card) 85'; Dembélé (yellow card) 87'; Mendes (yellow card) 90+4'	Stadium: MetLife Stadium; Attendance: 81,118; Referee: Alireza Faghani (Australia)

== Statistics ==
=== Appearances and goals ===
No.	Pos	Nat	Player	Total		Ligue 1		Coupe de France		Trophée des Champions		UEFA Champions League		FIFA Club World Cup	
No.	Pos	Nat	Player	Apps	Goals	Apps	Goals	Apps	Goals	Apps	Goals	Apps	Goals	Apps	Goals
Goalkeepers
1	GK	(Italy) ITA	Gianluigi Donnarumma	47	0	24	0	0	0	1	0	15	0	7	0
39	GK	(Russia) RUS	Matvey Safonov	17	0	9+1	0	5	0	0	0	2	0	0	0
80	GK	(Spain) ESP	Arnau Tenas	2	0	1	0	1	0	0	0	0	0	0	0
Defenders
2	DF	(Morocco) MAR	Achraf Hakimi	55	11	24+1	4	4+1	1	1	0	17	4	7	2
3	DF	(France) FRA	Presnel Kimpembe	5	0	0+2	0	0+2	0	0	0	0+1	0	0	0
4	DF	(Brazil) BRA	Lucas Beraldo	38	1	22+3	1	3+1	0	0	0	1+3	0	3+2	0
5	DF	(Brazil) BRA	Marquinhos	48	3	19+3	2	3	1	1	0	16	0	6	0
21	DF	(France) FRA	Lucas Hernandez	29	0	10+6	0	3+1	0	0	0	1+4	0	1+3	0
25	DF	(Portugal) POR	Nuno Mendes	53	5	19+5	1	3+2	0	1	0	16	4	6+1	0
43	DF	(France) FRA	Noham Kamara	2	0	0+2	0	0	0	0	0	0	0	0	0
51	DF	(Ecuador) ECU	Willian Pacho	57	0	23+5	0	4+2	0	1	0	17	0	5	0
Midfielders
8	MF	(Spain) ESP	Fabián Ruiz	61	8	21+9	4	5+1	0	0+1	0	14+3	1	6+1	3
14	MF	(France) FRA	Désiré Doué	61	16	18+13	6	6	4	1	0	8+8	5	7	1
17	MF	(Portugal) POR	Vitinha	59	8	20+9	5	3+2	0	1	0	16+1	2	7	1
19	MF	(South Korea) KOR	Lee Kang-in	49	7	19+11	6	2+1	0	1	0	4+7	0	0+4	1
24	MF	(France) FRA	Senny Mayulu	34	6	8+12	2	3+1	1	0+1	0	0+4	2	2+3	1
33	MF	(France) FRA	Warren Zaïre-Emery	55	3	23+6	1	2+3	1	1	0	6+7	1	1+6	0
87	MF	(Portugal) POR	João Neves	59	7	22+7	3	5	1	1	0	16+1	1	6+1	2
Forwards
7	FW	(Georgia (country)) GEO	Khvicha Kvaratskhelia	32	8	11+3	4	2	0	0	0	8+1	3	7	1
9	FW	(Portugal) POR	Gonçalo Ramos	46	19	12+10	10	3+3	5	0+1	0	1+11	3	2+3	1
10	FW	(France) FRA	Ousmane Dembélé	53	35	20+9	21	3+1	3	1	1	13+2	8	2+2	2
29	FW	(France) FRA	Bradley Barcola	64	21	27+7	14	3+3	4	0+1	0	14+3	3	2+4	0
49	FW	(France) FRA	Ibrahim Mbaye	12	1	4+5	1	0+1	0	0	0	0	0	0+2	0
Players transferred/loaned out during the season
11	FW	(Spain) ESP	Marco Asensio	16	2	8+4	2	0	0	0	0	2+2	0	0	0
23	FW	(France) FRA	Randal Kolo Muani	14	2	2+8	2	0	0	0	0	0+4	0	0	0
37	DF	(Slovakia) SVK	Milan Škriniar	5	0	4+1	0	0	0	0	0	0	0	0	0
42	DF	(France) FRA	Yoram Zague	6	0	2+2	0	2	0	0	0	0	0	0	0
48	DF	(France) FRA	Axel Tape	3	0	2	0	1	0	0	0	0	0	0	0

Source: Competitions
