= 2023–24 Paris Saint-Germain FC season =

54th season in existence of Paris Saint-Germain

Paris Saint-Germain
2023–24 season
- President: Nasser Al-Khelaifi
- Head coach: Luis Enrique
- Stadium: Parc des Princes
- Ligue 1: 1st
- Coupe de France: Winners
- Trophée des Champions: Winners
- UEFA Champions League: Semi-finals
- Top goalscorer: League: Kylian Mbappé (27); All: Kylian Mbappé (44)
- Highest home attendance: 47,926 vs Marseille, Ligue 1, 24 September 2023; 47,926 vs Nantes, Ligue 1, 9 December 2023
- Lowest home attendance: 41,261 vs Strasbourg, Ligue 1, 21 October 2023
- Average home league attendance: 47,370
- Biggest win: 9–0 vs Revel, Coupe de France, 7 January 2024
- Biggest defeat: 1–4 vs Newcastle United, Champions League, 4 October 2023
Home colours	Away colours	Third colours

The 2023–24 season was the 54th season in the history of Paris Saint-Germain and its 50th consecutive season in the top flight. The club participated in Ligue 1, the Coupe de France, the UEFA Champions League, and the Trophée des Champions.

This was the first season since 2016–17 without Neymar and Julian Draxler, who both left the Parisian side to join Saudi Arabian club Al Hilal and the Qatari club Al Ahli, and the first since 2011–12 without Marco Verratti, who joined Qatari club Al-Arabi.

== Players ==
=== First-team squad ===
As of 26 April 2024

Note: Flags indicate national team as defined under FIFA eligibility rules; some limited exceptions apply. Players may hold more than one non-FIFA nationality.

No.	Pos.	Nation	Player
1	GK	CRC	Keylor Navas
2	DF	MAR	Achraf Hakimi
3	DF	FRA	Presnel Kimpembe (3rd-captain)
4	MF	URU	Manuel Ugarte
5	DF	BRA	Marquinhos (captain)
7	FW	FRA	Kylian Mbappé (4th-captain)
8	MF	ESP	Fabián Ruiz
9	FW	POR	Gonçalo Ramos
10	FW	FRA	Ousmane Dembélé
11	FW	ESP	Marco Asensio
15	DF	POR	Danilo Pereira (vice-captain)
16	GK	ESP	Sergio Rico
17	MF	POR	Vitinha
19	MF	KOR	Lee Kang-in
21	DF	FRA	Lucas Hernandez

No.	Pos.	Nation	Player
23	FW	FRA	Randal Kolo Muani
25	DF	POR	Nuno Mendes
26	DF	FRA	Nordi Mukiele
28	MF	ESP	Carlos Soler
29	FW	FRA	Bradley Barcola
33	MF	FRA	Warren Zaïre-Emery
35	DF	BRA	Lucas Beraldo
37	DF	SVK	Milan Škriniar
38	MF	FRA	Ethan Mbappé
41	MF	FRA	Senny Mayulu
80	GK	ESP	Arnau Tenas
90	GK	FRA	Alexandre Letellier
97	DF	FRA	Layvin Kurzawa
99	GK	ITA	Gianluigi Donnarumma

=== Out on loan ===
Note: Flags indicate national team as defined under FIFA eligibility rules; some limited exceptions apply. Players may hold more than one non-FIFA nationality.

No.	Pos.	Nation	Player
—	GK	FRA	Lucas Lavallée (on loan at Dunkerque until 30 June 2024)
—	DF	ESP	Juan Bernat (on loan at Benfica until 30 June 2024)
—	DF	FRA	Colin Dagba (on loan at Auxerre until 30 June 2024)
—	DF	FRA	Vimoj Muntu Wa Mungu (on loan at Torino until 30 June 2024)
—	MF	ESP	Ismaël Gharbi (on loan at Stade Lausanne Ouchy until 30 June 2024)
—	MF	FRA	Ayman Kari (on loan at Lorient until 30 June 2024)

No.	Pos.	Nation	Player
—	MF	BRA	Gabriel Moscardo (on loan at Corinthians until 30 June 2024)
—	MF	ITA	Cher Ndour (on loan at Braga until 30 June 2024)
—	MF	POR	Renato Sanches (on loan at Roma until 30 June 2024)
—	MF	NED	Xavi Simons (on loan at RB Leipzig until 30 June 2024)
—	FW	MAR	Ilyes Housni (on loan at Al Sadd until 30 June 2024)
—	FW	FRA	Noha Lemina (on loan at Wolverhampton Wanderers until 30 June 2024)

=== Other players under contract ===
Note: Flags indicate national team as defined under FIFA eligibility rules; some limited exceptions apply. Players may hold more than one non-FIFA nationality.

No.	Pos.	Nation	Player
50	GK	POR	Louis Mouquet

== Transfers ==
=== In ===
No.	Pos.	Player	Transferred from	Fee	Date	Source
44	FW	(France) Hugo Ekitike	(France) Reims	€28.5 million (Note: Up to €6.5 million in bonuses.)	10 June 2023	
37	DF	(Slovakia) Milan Škriniar	(Italy) Inter Milan	Free	6 July 2023	
11	MF	(Spain) Marco Asensio	(Spain) Real Madrid	Free	6 July 2023	
4	MF	(Uruguay) Manuel Ugarte	(Portugal) Sporting CP	€60 million	7 July 2023	
19	MF	(South Korea) Lee Kang-in	(Spain) Mallorca	€22 million	8 July 2023	
21	DF	(France) Lucas Hernandez	(Germany) Bayern Munich	€40 million (Note: Up to €5 million in bonuses.)	9 July 2023	
27	MF	(Italy) Cher Ndour	(Portugal) Benfica	Free	12 July 2023	
—	MF	(Netherlands) Xavi Simons	(Netherlands) PSV	€6 million	19 July 2023	
80	GK	(Spain) Arnau Tenas	Unattached	Free	30 July 2023	
9	FW	(Portugal) Gonçalo Ramos	(Portugal) Benfica	Loan (Note: Included an option to sign permanently for €65 million, with up to €15 million in bonuses. Differing sources claimed the buy option was obligatory.)	7 August 2023	
10	FW	(France) Ousmane Dembélé	(Spain) Barcelona	€50.4 million	12 August 2023	
29	FW	(France) Bradley Barcola	(France) Lyon	€45 million	31 August 2023	
23	FW	(France) Randal Kolo Muani	(Germany) Eintracht Frankfurt	€80 million	1 September 2023	
9	FW	(Portugal) Gonçalo Ramos	(Portugal) Benfica	€65 million (Note: Up to €15 million in bonuses.)	22 November 2023	
35	DF	(Brazil) Lucas Beraldo	(Brazil) São Paulo	€20 million	1 January 2024	
—	MF	(Brazil) Gabriel Moscardo	(Brazil) Corinthians	€20 million (Note: Up to €2 million in bonuses.)	25 January 2024	

=== Out ===
Pos.	Player	Transferred to	Fee	Date	Source
MF	(France) Éric Junior Dina Ebimbe	(Germany) Eintracht Frankfurt	€6.5 million	1 July 2023	
DF	(Spain) Sergio Ramos	Released	Free	1 July 2023	
MF	(Comoros) Anfane Ahamada	Released	Free	1 July 2023	
FW	(Argentina) Lionel Messi	Released (Note: On 15 July 2023, Messi joined Inter Miami.)	Free	1 July 2023	
FW	(France) Samuel Noireau-Dauriat	Released	Free	1 July 2023	
MF	(France) Ayman Kari	(France) Lorient	Loan (Note: Includes an option to sign permanently for €5 million.)	6 July 2023	
DF	(France) Younes El Hannach	(Qatar) Al-Shamal	Undisclosed	16 July 2023	
DF	(France) El Chadaille Bitshiabu	(Germany) RB Leipzig	€15 million	18 July 2023	
MF	(Netherlands) Xavi Simons	(Germany) RB Leipzig	Loan	19 July 2023	
GK	(France) Lucas Lavallée	(France) Dunkerque	Loan	19 July 2023	
MF	(France) Zoumana Bagbema	(France) Caen	Free	20 July 2023	
FW	(Argentina) Mauro Icardi	(Turkey) Galatasaray	€10 million	28 July 2023	
FW	(France) Djeidi Gassama	(England) Sheffield Wednesday	Free	15 August 2023	
FW	(Brazil) Neymar	(Saudi Arabia) Al Hilal	€90 million	15 August 2023	
DF	(Senegal) Abdou Diallo	(Qatar) Al-Arabi	€15 million	15 August 2023	
MF	(Argentina) Leandro Paredes	(Italy) Roma	€2.5 million (Note: Up to €2 million in bonuses.)	16 August 2023	
MF	(Portugal) Renato Sanches	(Italy) Roma	Loan (Note: €1 million loan fee with a €15 million option to sign permanently, which could become obligatory under certain conditions.)	16 August 2023	
FW	(France) Noha Lemina	(Italy) Sampdoria	Loan	24 August 2023	
DF	(France) Nehemiah Fernandez	(France) Dunkerque	Undisclosed	1 September 2023	
MF	(Spain) Ismaël Gharbi	(Switzerland) Stade Lausanne Ouchy	Loan	1 September 2023	
DF	(Spain) Juan Bernat	(Portugal) Benfica	Loan	1 September 2023	
DF	(France) Vimoj Muntu Wa Mungu	(Italy) Torino	Loan (Note: Includes an option to sign permanently.)	1 September 2023	
DF	(France) Colin Dagba	(France) Auxerre	Loan	1 September 2023	
DF	(France) Timothée Pembélé	(England) Sunderland	€1 million	1 September 2023	
MF	(Netherlands) Georginio Wijnaldum	(Saudi Arabia) Al-Ettifaq	€10 million	2 September 2023	
GK	(Madagascar) Mathyas Randriamamy	(Cyprus) Ermis Aradippou	Free	4 September 2023	
DF	(France) Moutanabi Bodiang	Released	Free	5 September 2023	
FW	(France) Kenny Nagera	Released	Free	5 September 2023	
MF	(Italy) Marco Verratti	(Qatar) Al-Arabi	€45 million	13 September 2023	
MF	(France) Édouard Michut	(Turkey) Adana Demirspor	Loan	15 September 2023	
MF	(Germany) Julian Draxler	(Qatar) Al Ahli	€20 million	18 September 2023	
FW	(Morocco) Ilyes Housni	(Qatar) Al Sadd	Loan	18 September 2023	
MF	(France) Édouard Michut	(Turkey) Adana Demirspor	Free	24 January 2024	
MF	(Brazil) Gabriel Moscardo	(Brazil) Corinthians	Loan	25 January 2024	
MF	(Italy) Cher Ndour	(Portugal) Braga	Loan	29 January 2024	
FW	(France) Noha Lemina	(England) Wolverhampton Wanderers	Loan (Note: Includes an option to sign permanently for €1 million.)	31 January 2024	
FW	(France) Hugo Ekitike	(Germany) Eintracht Frankfurt	Loan (Note: Includes an option to sign permanently for €16.5 million.)	1 February 2024	
FW	(France) Hugo Ekitike	(Germany) Eintracht Frankfurt	€16.5 million	26 April 2024	

== Pre-season and friendlies ==
Win Draw Loss Fixtures

21 July 2023 Friendly	Paris Saint-Germain	2–0	Le Havre	Poissy, France
17:00 CEST (UTC+2)	Ekitike 53'; K. Mbappé 90+1'	Report		Stadium: Campus PSG; Attendance: 0

25 July 2023 Friendly	Paris Saint-Germain	0–0	Al Nassr	Osaka, Japan
19:20 JST (UTC+9)		Report		Stadium: Nagai Stadium; Attendance: 14,500; Referee: Yudai Yamamoto (Japan)

28 July 2023 Friendly	Paris Saint-Germain	2–3	Cerezo Osaka	Osaka, Japan
19:20 JST (UTC+9)	Ekitike 17'; Vitinha 49'; Hernandez (yellow card) 82'	Report	Croux 22'; Kitano 67'; Kagawa 79'	Stadium: Nagai Stadium; Attendance: 35,000; Referee: Ryo Tanimoto (Japan)

1 August 2023 Friendly	Paris Saint-Germain	1–2	Inter Milan	Tokyo, Japan
19:20 JST (UTC+9)	Vitinha 63'	Report	Mkhitaryan (yellow card) 23'; Esposito 81'; Sensi 83'	Stadium: Japan National Stadium; Referee: Jumpei Iida (Japan)

3 August 2023 Friendly	Jeonbuk Hyundai Motors	0–3	Paris Saint-Germain	Busan, South Korea
17:00 KST (UTC+9)		Report	Neymar 40', 83'; Asensio 88'	Stadium: Busan Asiad Main Stadium; Attendance: 43,520; Referee: Choi Hyun-jai (South Korea)

== Competitions ==
=== Overall record ===
Competition	First match	Last match	Starting round	Final position	Record							
Competition	First match	Last match	Starting round	Final position	Pld	W	D	L	GF	GA	GD	Win %
Ligue 1	12 August 2023	19 May 2024	Matchday 1	Winners	34	22	10	2	81	33	+48	64.71
Coupe de France	7 January 2024	25 May 2024	Round of 64	Winners	6	6	0	0	22	4	+18	100.00
Trophée des Champions	3 January 2024		Final	Winners	1	1	0	0	2	0	+2	100.00
UEFA Champions League	19 September 2023	7 May 2024	Group stage	Semi-finals	12	5	2	5	19	15	+4	41.67
Total					53	34	12	7	124	52	+72	64.15

Source: Soccerway

=== Ligue 1 ===
==== League table ====
Pos	Team	Pld	W	D	L	GF	GA	GD	Pts	Qualification or relegation
1	Paris Saint-Germain (C)	34	22	10	2	81	33	+48	76	Qualification for the Champions League league phase
2	Monaco	34	20	7	7	68	42	+26	67	Qualification for the Champions League league phase
3	Brest	34	17	10	7	53	34	+19	61	Qualification for the Champions League league phase
4	Lille	34	16	11	7	52	34	+18	59	Qualification for the Champions League third qualifying round
5	Nice	34	15	10	9	40	29	+11	55	Qualification for the Europa League league phase (Note: Since the 2023–24 Coupe de France winners, Paris Saint-Germain, qualified for the Champions League via league position, the Europa League berth awarded to the cup winners was passed to the sixth-placed team and the Conference League berth was passed to the seventh-placed team.)

Source: Ligue 1
Rules for classification: 1) Points; 2) Goal difference; 3) Head-to-head points; 4) Head-to-head goal difference; 5) Head-to-head goals scored; 6) Head-to-head away goals scored; 7) Goals scored; 8) Away goals scored; 9) Fair-play points (Note: Head-to-head record is used only after all the matches between the teams in question have been played).
(C) Champions

==== Results summary ====
Overall								Home						Away					
Pld	W	D	L	GF	GA	GD	Pts	W	D	L	GF	GA	GD	W	D	L	GF	GA	GD
34	22	10	2	81	33	+48	76	9	6	2	42	22	+20	13	4	0	39	11	+28

Source: Ligue 1

==== Results by round ====
Round	1	2	3	4	5	6	7	8	9	10	11	12	13	14	15	16	17	18	19	20	21	22	23	24	25	26	27	28	29	30	31	32	33	34
Ground	H	A	H	A	H	H	A	A	H	A	H	A	H	A	H	A	H	A	H	A	H	A	H	A	H	A	A	H	A	H	H	A	H	A
Result	D	D	W	W	L	W	D	W	W	W	W	W	W	W	W	D	W	W	D	W	W	W	D	D	D	W	W	D	W	W	D	W	L	W
Position	12	11	8	2	5	3	5	3	3	2	2	1	1	1	1	1	1	1	1	1	1	1	1	1	1	1	1	1	1	1	1	1	1	1

Source: Ligue 1
A = Away; H = Home; W = Win; D = Draw; L = Loss

==== Matches ====
The league fixtures were announced on 29 June 2023.

12 August 2023 1	Paris Saint-Germain	0–0	Lorient	Paris
21:00 CEST (UTC+2)		Report		Stadium: Parc des Princes; Attendance: 47,579; Referee: Bastien Dechepy

19 August 2023 2	Toulouse	1–1	Paris Saint-Germain	Toulouse
21:00 CEST (UTC+2)	Aboukhlal 87' (pen.)	Report	Lee (yellow card) 45+1'; K. Mbappé 62' (pen.); Ugarte (yellow card) 81'; Donnarumma (yellow card) 85'	Stadium: Stadium de Toulouse; Attendance: 27,332; Referee: Thomas Léonard

26 August 2023 3	Paris Saint-Germain	3–1	Lens	Paris
21:00 CEST (UTC+2)	Asensio 45'; K. Mbappé 52', 90+1'	Report	Medina (yellow card) 20'; Sotoca (yellow card) 42'; Spierings (yellow card) 79'; Machado (yellow card) 82'; Gradit (yellow card) 87'; Guilavogui 90+5'	Stadium: Parc des Princes; Attendance: 47,864; Referee: François Letexier

3 September 2023 4	Lyon	1–4	Paris Saint-Germain	Décines-Charpieu
20:45 CEST (UTC+2)	Tolisso (yellow card) 4', (goal) 74' (pen.); Maitland-Niles (yellow card) 58'	Report	K. Mbappé 4' (pen.), 45+1'; Hakimi 20'; Asensio 38'; Hernandez (yellow card) 48'; Zaïre-Emery (yellow card) 73'	Stadium: Parc Olympique Lyonnais; Attendance: 51,657; Referee: Eric Wattellier

15 September 2023 5	Paris Saint-Germain	2–3	Nice	Paris
21:00 CEST (UTC+2)	K. Mbappé 29', 87'; Barcola (yellow card) 82'; Škriniar (yellow card) 89'	Report	Moffi 21', 69', (yellow card) 70'; Thuram (yellow card) 35'; Laborde 53'; Bard (yellow card) 63'; Bułka (yellow card) 73'; Lotomba (yellow card) 90+5'	Stadium: Parc des Princes; Attendance: 47,874; Referee: Clément Turpin

24 September 2023 6	Paris Saint-Germain	4–0	Marseille	Paris
20:45 CEST (UTC+2)	Hakimi 8'; Kolo Muani 37'; Ramos 47', 89'	Report	Gigot (yellow card) 73'; Veretout (yellow card) 82'; Lodi (yellow card) 85'	Stadium: Parc des Princes; Attendance: 47,926; Referee: Willy Delajod

30 September 2023 7	Clermont	0–0	Paris Saint-Germain	Clermont-Ferrand
17:00 CEST (UTC+2)	Gonalons (yellow card) 57'; Konaté (yellow card) 90'	Report	Zaïre-Emery (yellow card) 75'; K. Mbappé (yellow card) 81'; Fabián (yellow card) 90+3'	Stadium: Stade Gabriel Montpied; Attendance: 10,586; Referee: Marc Bollengier

8 October 2023 8	Rennes	1–3	Paris Saint-Germain	Rennes
20:45 CEST (UTC+2)	Omari (yellow card) 42'; Gouiri 56'	Report	Vitinha 32'; Hakimi 36'; Kolo Muani 58'	Stadium: Roazhon Park; Attendance: 27,734; Referee: Benoît Bastien

21 October 2023 9	Paris Saint-Germain	3–0	Strasbourg	Paris
17:00 CEST (UTC+2)	K. Mbappé 10' (pen.); Soler 31'; Fabián 77'; Lee (yellow card) 82'; Ndour (yellow card) 88'	Report		Stadium: Parc des Princes; Attendance: 41,261; Referee: Bastien Dechepy

29 October 2023 10	Brest	2–3	Paris Saint-Germain	Brest
13:00 CEST (UTC+2)	Mounié 43'; Le Douaron 52'; Brassier (yellow card) 86'; Martin (yellow card) 87'	Report	Zaïre-Emery 16'; K. Mbappé 28', 89', (penalty missed) 89'; Hakimi (yellow card) 87'; Ruiz (yellow card) 88'	Stadium: Stade Francis-Le Blé; Attendance: 15,183; Referee: Jérôme Brisard

3 November 2023 11	Paris Saint-Germain	3–0	Montpellier	Paris
21:00 CET (UTC+1)	Lee 10'; Zaïre-Emery 58'; Vitinha 66'; Mukiele (yellow card) 82'	Report		Stadium: Parc des Princes; Attendance: 47,647; Referee: Ruddy Buquet

11 November 2023 12	Reims	0–3	Paris Saint-Germain	Reims
17:00 CET (UTC+1)	Abdelhamid (yellow card) 51'	Report	K. Mbappé 3', 59', 82'	Stadium: Stade Auguste-Delaune; Attendance: 20,500; Referee: Willy Delajod

24 November 2023 13	Paris Saint-Germain	5–2	Monaco	Paris
21:00 CET (UTC+1)	Ramos 18'; K. Mbappé 39' (pen.); Dembélé 70'; Vitinha 72'; Kolo Muani 90+6'	Report	Minamino 22'; Singo (yellow card) 59'; Balogun 75'	Stadium: Parc des Princes; Attendance: 47,896; Referee: Benoît Bastien

3 December 2023 14	Le Havre	0–2	Paris Saint-Germain	Le Havre
13:00 CET (UTC+1)	Opéri (yellow card) 68'; Alioui (yellow card) 76'	Report	Donnarumma (red card) 10'; K. Mbappé 23'; Pereira (yellow card) 87'; Vitinha 89'	Stadium: Stade Océane; Attendance: 24,569; Referee: Bastien Dechepy

9 December 2023 15	Paris Saint-Germain	2–1	Nantes	Paris
21:00 CET (UTC+1)	Barcola 41'; Kolo Muani 83'; Hernandez (yellow card) 90+2'	Report	Douglas Augusto (yellow card) 29'; Mohamed 55'; Duverne (yellow card) 82'; Pierre-Gabriel (yellow card) 90+2'	Stadium: Parc des Princes; Attendance: 47,926; Referee: Jérôme Brisard

17 December 2023 16	Lille	1–1	Paris Saint-Germain	Villeneuve-d'Ascq
20:45 CET (UTC+1)	Diakité (yellow card) 66'; David 90+4'	Report	Ugarte (yellow card) 18'; K. Mbappé 66' (pen.)	Stadium: Stade Pierre-Mauroy; Attendance: 47,993; Referee: Willy Delajod

20 December 2023 17	Paris Saint-Germain	3–1	Metz	Paris
21:00 CET (UTC+1)	Vitinha 49'; K. Mbappé 60', 83'	Report	Hérelle (yellow card) 32'; Udol 72'	Stadium: Parc des Princes; Attendance: 47,822; Referee: Ruddy Buquet

14 January 2024 18	Lens	0–2	Paris Saint-Germain	Lens
20:45 CET (UTC+1)	Frankowski (penalty missed) 7'; Gradit (red card) 45+3'	Report	Barcola 30'; Soler (yellow card) 52'; K. Mbappé 89'	Stadium: Stade Bollaert-Delelis; Attendance: 38,200; Referee: Jérôme Brisard

28 January 2024 19	Paris Saint-Germain	2–2	Brest	Paris
20:45 CET (UTC+1)	Hernandez (yellow card) 26'; Asensio 38'; Kolo Muani 45'; K. Mbappé (yellow card) 53'; Zaïre-Emery (yellow card) 58'; Barcola (yellow card) 90+2' (yellow-red card) 90+4'	Report	Lees-Melou (yellow card) 32'; Lala (yellow card) 53'; Camara 55'; Brassier (yellow card) 59'; Pereira Lage 80'	Stadium: Parc des Princes; Attendance: 46,905; Referee: Clément Turpin

2 February 2024 20	Strasbourg	1–2	Paris Saint-Germain	Strasbourg
21:00 CET (UTC+1)	Sissoko (yellow card) 27'; Mwanga (yellow card) 54'; Senaya (yellow card) 63'; Bakwa 68'	Report	K. Mbappé (penalty missed) 6', 31'; Hernandez (yellow card) 30'; Asensio 49'	Stadium: Stade de la Meinau; Attendance: 25,834; Referee: Ruddy Buquet

10 February 2024 21	Paris Saint-Germain	3–1	Lille	Paris
21:00 CET (UTC+1)	Ramos 10'; Alexsandro 17' (o.g.); Ugarte (yellow card) 35'; Mukiele (yellow card) 74'; Kolo Muani 80'	Report	Yazıcı 6'; André (yellow card) 16'; Ismaily (yellow card) 32'; Alexsandro (yellow card) 52'	Stadium: Parc des Princes; Attendance: 47,716; Referee: François Letexier

17 February 2024 22	Nantes	0–2	Paris Saint-Germain	Nantes
21:00 CET (UTC+1)	Sissoko (yellow card) 77'	Report	Hernandez 60'; K. Mbappé 78' (pen.)	Stadium: Stade de la Beaujoire; Attendance: 34,038; Referee: Jérôme Brisard

25 February 2024 23	Paris Saint-Germain	1–1	Rennes	Paris
17:05 CET (UTC+1)	Hakimi (yellow card) 54'; Hernandez (yellow card) 70'; Ramos (yellow card) 87', (goal) 90+7' (pen.); Fabián (yellow card) 89'; Beraldo (yellow card) 90+5'	Report	Gouiri 33'; D. Doué (yellow card) 48'; Blas (yellow card) 90+2'; Mandanda (yellow card) 90+5'	Stadium: Parc des Princes; Attendance: 47,874; Referee: Bastien Dechepy

1 March 2024 24	Monaco	0–0	Paris Saint-Germain	Monaco
21:00 CET (UTC+1)		Report		Stadium: Stade Louis II; Attendance: 14,700; Referee: Ruddy Buquet

10 March 2024 25	Paris Saint-Germain	2–2	Reims	Paris
13:00 CET (UTC+1)	Abdelhamid 17' (o.g.); Ramos 19'; Ugarte (yellow card) 42'; Hakimi (yellow card) 54'	Report	Munetsi 7'; De Smet (yellow card) 39'; Diakité 45'; Itō (yellow card) 79'	Stadium: Parc des Princes; Attendance: 47,917; Referee: Willy Delajod

17 March 2024 26	Montpellier	2–6	Paris Saint-Germain	Montpellier
20:45 CET (UTC+1)	Nordin 30'; Savanier 45+3' (pen.)	Report	Vitinha 14'; K. Mbappé 22', 50', 63'; Beraldo (yellow card) 38'; Donnarumma (yellow card) 45'; Lee 53'; Mendes (yellow card) 72', (goal) 89'	Stadium: Stade de la Mosson; Attendance: 19,202; Referee: Florent Batta

31 March 2024 27	Marseille	0–2	Paris Saint-Germain	Marseille
20:45 CEST (UTC+2)		Report	Beraldo (yellow card) 15', (red card) 40'; Hernandez (yellow card) 38'; Pereira (yellow card) 40'; Donnarumma (yellow card) 45'; Vitinha 53'; Ramos 85'	Stadium: Stade Vélodrome; Attendance: 66,046; Referee: Benoît Bastien

6 April 2024 28	Paris Saint-Germain	1–1	Clermont	Paris
21:00 CEST (UTC+2)	Ugarte (yellow card) 76'; Ramos 85'	Report	Keïta 32'	Stadium: Parc des Princes; Attendance: 47,607; Referee: Gaël Angoula

21 April 2024 30	Paris Saint-Germain	4–1	Lyon	Paris
21:00 CEST (UTC+2)	Matić 3' (o.g.); Beraldo 6'; Ramos 33', 42'	Report	Nuamah 37'	Stadium: Parc des Princes; Attendance: 47,700; Referee: François Letexier

24 April 2024 29	Lorient	1–4	Paris Saint-Germain	Lorient
19:00 CEST (UTC+2)	Bakayoko (yellow card) 63'; Bamba 73'	Report	Dembélé 19', 60'; K. Mbappé 22', 90'; Mendes (yellow card) 26'	Stadium: Stade du Moustoir; Attendance: 16,738; Referee: Marc Bollengier
Note: The match was originally scheduled for 14 April 2024, but was postponed due to Paris Saint-Germain's progression in the UEFA Champions League.

27 April 2024 31	Paris Saint-Germain	3–3	Le Havre	Paris
21:00 CEST (UTC+2)	Barcola 29'; Zaïre-Emery (yellow card) 75'; Hakimi 78'; K. Mbappé (yellow card) 90+3'; Ramos 90+5'	Report	Opéri 19'; Ayew 38'; Touré 61' (pen.); Sangante (yellow card) 90+7'	Stadium: Parc des Princes; Attendance: 47,922; Referee: Willy Delajod

12 May 2024 33	Paris Saint-Germain	1–3	Toulouse	Paris
21:00 CEST (UTC+2)	K. Mbappé 8'	Report	Dallinga 13'; Gboho 68'; Magri 90+5'	Stadium: Parc des Princes; Attendance: 47,855; Referee: Florent Batta

15 May 2024 32	Nice	1–2	Paris Saint-Germain	Nice
21:00 CEST (UTC+2)	Cho 32'; Bard (red card) 75'; Rosario (yellow card) 90+3'	Report	Barcola 18'; Zague (yellow card) 20', (goal) 23'; Beraldo (yellow card) 26'; Marquinhos (yellow card) 33'	Stadium: Allianz Riviera; Attendance: 33,818; Referee: Ruddy Buquet
Note: The match was originally scheduled for 3 May 2024, but was postponed due to Paris Saint-Germain's progression in the UEFA Champions League.

19 May 2024 34	Metz	0–2	Paris Saint-Germain	Longeville-lès-Metz
21:00 CEST (UTC+2)	Jean Jacques (yellow card) 79'; Udol (yellow card) 86'	Report	Soler 7'; Lee 12'; Mendes (yellow card) 44'	Stadium: Stade Saint-Symphorien; Attendance: 28,455; Referee: Gaël Angoula

=== Coupe de France ===
7 January 2024 Round of 64	Revel	0–9	Paris Saint-Germain	Castres
20:45 CET (UTC+1)		Report	K. Mbappé 16', 45', 48'; N'Guessan 38' (o.g.); Asensio 43'; Ramos 71' (pen.); Kolo Muani 76', 90'; Ndour 87'	Stadium: Stade Pierre-Fabre; Attendance: 9,351; Referee: Florent Batta

20 January 2024 Round of 32	Orléans	1–4	Paris Saint-Germain	Orléans
20:45 CET (UTC+1)	Saint-Ruf 86'	Report	K. Mbappé 16', 63' (pen.); Beraldo (yellow card) 39'; Ramos 72'; Mayulu 88'	Stadium: Stade de la Source; Attendance: 7,800; Referee: Marc Bollengier

7 February 2024 Round of 16	Paris Saint-Germain	3–1	Brest	Paris
21:10 CET (UTC+1)	K. Mbappé 34'; Pereira 37'; Ramos 90+2'	Report	Magnetti (yellow card) 14'; Brassier (yellow card) 60' (yellow-red card) 67'; Mounié 65'	Stadium: Parc des Princes; Attendance: 46,895; Referee: Benoît Bastien

13 March 2024 Quarter-finals	Paris Saint-Germain	3–1	Nice	Paris
21:10 CET (UTC+1)	K. Mbappé 14'; Fabián 33'; Beraldo 60'	Report	Laborde 37'	Stadium: Parc des Princes; Attendance: 47,619; Referee: François Letexier

3 April 2024 Semi-finals	Paris Saint-Germain	1–0	Rennes	Paris
21:10 CEST (UTC+2)	K. Mbappé (penalty missed) 37', 40'; Dembélé (yellow card) 69'	Report	Seidu (yellow card) 81'	Stadium: Parc des Princes; Attendance: 47,879; Referee: Ruddy Buquet

25 May 2024 Final	Lyon	1–2	Paris Saint-Germain	Villeneuve-d'Ascq
21:00 CEST (UTC+2)	Ćaleta-Car (yellow card) 45+2'; O'Brien 55'; Tagliafico (yellow card) 88'	Report	Dembélé 22', (yellow card) 88'; Fabián 34'	Stadium: Stade Pierre-Mauroy; Attendance: 46,577; Referee: François Letexier

=== Trophée des Champions ===
3 January 2024 Final	Paris Saint-Germain	2–0	Toulouse	Paris
20:45 CET (UTC+1)	Lee 3'; K. Mbappé 44'; Vitinha (yellow card) 46'; Hernandez (yellow card) 77'	Report	Suazo (yellow card) 45+1'	Stadium: Parc des Princes; Attendance: 43,792; Referee: Hakim Ben El Hadj

=== UEFA Champions League ===
==== Group stage ====
The draw for the group stage was held on 31 August 2023.

Pos	Team	Pld	W	D	L	GF	GA	GD	Pts	Qualification	DOR	PAR	MIL	NEW
1	(Germany) Borussia Dortmund	6	3	2	1	7	4	+3	11	Advance to knockout phase	—	1–1	0–0	2–0
2	(France) Paris Saint-Germain	6	2	2	2	9	8	+1	8 (Note: Tied on head-to-head points. Head-to-head goal difference: Paris Saint-Germain +2, Milan −2.)	Advance to knockout phase	2–0	—	3–0	1–1
3	(Italy) Milan	6	2	2	2	5	8	−3	8	Transfer to Europa League	1–3	2–1	—	0–0
4	(England) Newcastle United	6	1	2	3	6	7	−1	5		0–1	4–1	1–2	—

Source: UEFA
Rules for classification: Group stage tiebreakers
Notes:

19 September 2023 1	Paris Saint-Germain (France)	2–0	(Germany) Borussia Dortmund	Paris, France
21:00 CEST (UTC+2)	K. Mbappé 49' (pen.); Hakimi 58'	Report	Schlotterbeck (yellow card) 66'; Can (yellow card) 67'; Ryerson (yellow card) 89'	Stadium: Parc des Princes; Attendance: 47,379; Referee: Jesús Gil Manzano (Spain)

4 October 2023 2	Newcastle United (England)	4–1	(France) Paris Saint-Germain	Newcastle, England
20:00 BST (UTC+1)	Almirón 17'; Burn 39'; Bruno Guimarães (yellow card) 45+7'; Longstaff 50'; Gordon (yellow card) 70'; Pope (yellow card) 87'; Schär 90+1'	Report	Hernandez (yellow card) 38', (goal) 56'; Hakimi (yellow card) 43'; Dembélé (yellow card) 67'; Zaïre-Emery (yellow card) 81'	Stadium: St James' Park; Attendance: 52,009; Referee: István Kovács (Romania)

25 October 2023 3	Paris Saint-Germain (France)	3–0	(Italy) Milan	Paris, France
21:00 CEST (UTC+2)	Hakimi (yellow card) 16'; K. Mbappé 32'; Dembélé (yellow card) 44'; Kolo Muani 53'; Lee 89'	Report	Thiaw (yellow card) 4'; Krunić (yellow card) 7'; Tomori (yellow card) 61'; Kalulu (yellow card) 62'	Stadium: Parc des Princes; Attendance: 45,962; Referee: Slavko Vinčić (Slovenia)

7 November 2023 4	Milan (Italy)	2–1	(France) Paris Saint-Germain	Milan, Italy
21:00 CET (UTC+1)	Leão 12'; Giroud 50'; Musah (yellow card) 66'	Report	Škriniar 9', (yellow card) 80'; Vitinha (yellow card) 24'; Kolo Muani (yellow card) 29'; Ugarte (yellow card) 43'; Hernandez (yellow card) 55'	Stadium: San Siro; Attendance: 75,649; Referee: Jesús Gil Manzano (Spain)

28 November 2023 5	Paris Saint-Germain (France)	1–1	(England) Newcastle United	Paris, France
21:00 CET (UTC+1)	Ugarte (yellow card) 36'; Lee (yellow card) 54'; Dembélé (yellow card) 58'; Škriniar (yellow card) 60'; Donnarumma (yellow card) 72'; Ramos (yellow card) 90+5'; K. Mbappé 90+8' (pen.)	Report	Joelinton (yellow card) 22'; Isak 24'; Almirón (yellow card) 83'; Pope (yellow card) 90+1'	Stadium: Parc des Princes; Attendance: 46,435; Referee: Szymon Marciniak (Poland)

13 December 2023 6	Borussia Dortmund (Germany)	1–1	(France) Paris Saint-Germain	Dortmund, Germany
21:00 CET (UTC+1)	Adeyemi 51'; Hummels (yellow card) 57'	Report	Marquinhos (yellow card) 45'; Zaïre-Emery 56'	Stadium: Westfalenstadion; Attendance: 81,365; Referee: Glenn Nyberg (Sweden)

==== Knockout phase ====
===== Round of 16 =====
The draw for the round of 16 was held on 18 December 2023.

14 February 2024 First leg	Paris Saint-Germain (France)	2–0	(Spain) Real Sociedad	Paris, France
21:00 CET (UTC+1)	K. Mbappé 58'; Barcola 70'	Report	Le Normand (yellow card) 36'; Traoré (yellow card) 90+2'	Stadium: Parc des Princes; Attendance: 46,435; Referee: Marco Guida (Italy)

5 March 2024 Second leg	Real Sociedad (Spain)	1–2 (1–4 agg.)	(France) Paris Saint-Germain	San Sebastián, Spain
21:00 CET (UTC+1)	Kubo (yellow card) 42'; Zubeldia (yellow card) 54'; Merino 89'	Report	K. Mbappé 15', 56'; Mendes (yellow card) 28'; Hakimi (yellow card) 41'; Dembélé (yellow card) 45+4'	Stadium: Anoeta; Attendance: 39,336; Referee: Michael Oliver (England)

===== Quarter-finals =====
The draw for the quarter-finals was held on 15 March 2024.

10 April 2024 First leg	Paris Saint-Germain (France)	2–3	(Spain) Barcelona	Paris, France
21:00 CEST (UTC+2)	Dembélé 48'; Vitinha 51', (yellow card) 65'; Beraldo (yellow card) 89'	Report	Roberto (yellow card) 34'; Raphinha 37', 62'; Christensen 77', (yellow card) 88'; Cubarsí (yellow card) 82'; López (yellow card) 89'	Stadium: Parc des Princes; Attendance: 47,470; Referee: Anthony Taylor (England)

16 April 2024 Second leg	Barcelona (Spain)	1–4 (4–6 agg.)	(France) Paris Saint-Germain	Barcelona, Spain
21:00 CEST (UTC+2)	Raphinha 12', (yellow card) 90+7'; Araújo (red card) 29'; Martínez (yellow card) 40'; Lewandowski (yellow card) 50'; Gündoğan (yellow card) 64'; López (yellow card) 90+8'	Report	Dembélé 40'; K. Mbappé (yellow card) 40', (goal) 61', 89'; Fabián (yellow card) 45+1'; Vitinha 54'; Marquinhos (yellow card) 62'; Donnarumma (yellow card) 87'	Stadium: Estadi Olímpic Lluís Companys; Attendance: 50,309; Referee: István Kovács (Romania)

===== Semi-finals =====
The draw for the semi-finals was held on 15 March 2024, right after the draw for the quarter-finals.

1 May 2024 First leg	Borussia Dortmund (Germany)	1–0	(France) Paris Saint-Germain	Dortmund, Germany
21:00 CEST (UTC+2)	Maatsen (yellow card) 19'; Füllkrug 36'; Schlotterbeck (yellow card) 73'	Report	Fabián (yellow card) 53'	Stadium: Westfalenstadion; Attendance: 81,365; Referee: Anthony Taylor (England)

7 May 2024 Second leg	Paris Saint-Germain (France)	0–1 (0–2 agg.)	(Germany) Borussia Dortmund	Paris, France
21:00 CEST (UTC+2)	Dembélé (yellow card) 75'; Hakimi (yellow card) 84'	Report	Hummels 50', (yellow card) 65'; Sabitzer (yellow card) 64'	Stadium: Parc des Princes; Attendance: 46,435; Referee: Daniele Orsato (Italy)

== Statistics ==
=== Appearances and goals ===
No.	Pos	Nat	Player	Total		Ligue 1		Coupe de France		Trophée des Champions		UEFA Champions League	
No.	Pos	Nat	Player	Apps	Goals	Apps	Goals	Apps	Goals	Apps	Goals	Apps	Goals
Goalkeepers
1	GK	(Costa Rica) CRC	Keylor Navas	6	0	4	0	2	0	0	0	0	0
30	GK	(France) FRA	Alexandre Letellier	0	0	0	0	0	0	0	0	0	0
80	GK	(Spain) ESP	Arnau Tenas	6	0	5+1	0	0	0	0	0	0	0
99	GK	(Italy) ITA	Gianluigi Donnarumma	42	0	25	0	4	0	1	0	12	0
Defenders
2	DF	(Morocco) MAR	Achraf Hakimi	40	5	20+5	4	3	0	1	0	11	1
3	DF	(France) FRA	Presnel Kimpembe	0	0	0	0	0	0	0	0	0	0
5	DF	(Brazil) BRA	Marquinhos	36	0	18+3	0	4	0	1	0	10	0
21	DF	(France) FRA	Lucas Hernandez	41	2	23+4	1	2	0	1	0	10+1	1
25	DF	(Portugal) POR	Nuno Mendes	14	1	2+4	1	3	0	0	0	5	0
26	DF	(France) FRA	Nordi Mukiele	20	0	9+7	0	1	0	0	0	0+3	0
97	DF	(France) FRA	Layvin Kurzawa	1	0	0+1	0	0	0	0	0	0	0
35	DF	(Brazil) BRA	Lucas Beraldo	24	2	12+1	1	5	1	0+1	0	4+1	0
37	DF	(Slovakia) SVK	Milan Škriniar	32	1	17+7	0	0+1	0	1	0	6	1
42	DF	(France) FRA	Yoram Zague	5	1	4+1	1	0	0	0	0	0	0
Midfielders
4	MF	(Uruguay) URU	Manuel Ugarte	37	0	21+4	0	1+3	0	0	0	5+3	0
8	MF	(Spain) ESP	Fabián Ruiz	35	3	14+7	1	5	2	0	0	7+2	0
11	MF	(Spain) ESP	Marco Asensio	31	5	13+6	4	2+3	1	0+1	0	1+5	0
15	MF	(Portugal) POR	Danilo Pereira	34	1	22+4	0	3+2	1	0	0	2+1	0
17	MF	(Portugal) POR	Vitinha	46	9	23+5	7	5	0	1	0	10+2	2
19	MF	(South Korea) KOR	Lee Kang-in	36	5	18+5	3	2+1	0	1	1	3+6	1
28	MF	(Spain) ESP	Carlos Soler	28	2	12+12	2	2	0	0	0	0+2	0
33	MF	(France) FRA	Warren Zaïre-Emery	43	3	21+5	2	4+1	0	1	0	10+1	1
38	MF	(France) FRA	Ethan Mbappé	5	0	0+3	0	0+2	0	0	0	0	0
41	MF	(France) FRA	Senny Mayulu	10	1	3+5	0	0+2	1	0	0	0	0
Forwards
7	FW	(France) FRA	Kylian Mbappé	48	44	24+5	27	6	8	1	1	12	8
9	FW	(Portugal) POR	Gonçalo Ramos	40	14	16+13	11	3+1	3	0	0	2+5	0
10	FW	(France) FRA	Ousmane Dembélé	42	6	17+9	3	4	1	1	0	11	2
23	FW	(France) FRA	Randal Kolo Muani	40	9	13+13	6	2+1	2	0+1	0	6+4	1
29	FW	(France) FRA	Bradley Barcola	39	5	18+7	4	2+1	0	1	0	5+5	1
Players transferred out during the season
27	MF	(Italy) ITA	Cher Ndour	4	1	0+3	0	1	1	0	0	0	0
44	FW	(France) FRA	Hugo Ekitike	1	0	0+1	0	0	0	0	0	0	0

Source: Competitions
