= Gonçalo Ramos =

Portuguese footballer (born 2001)

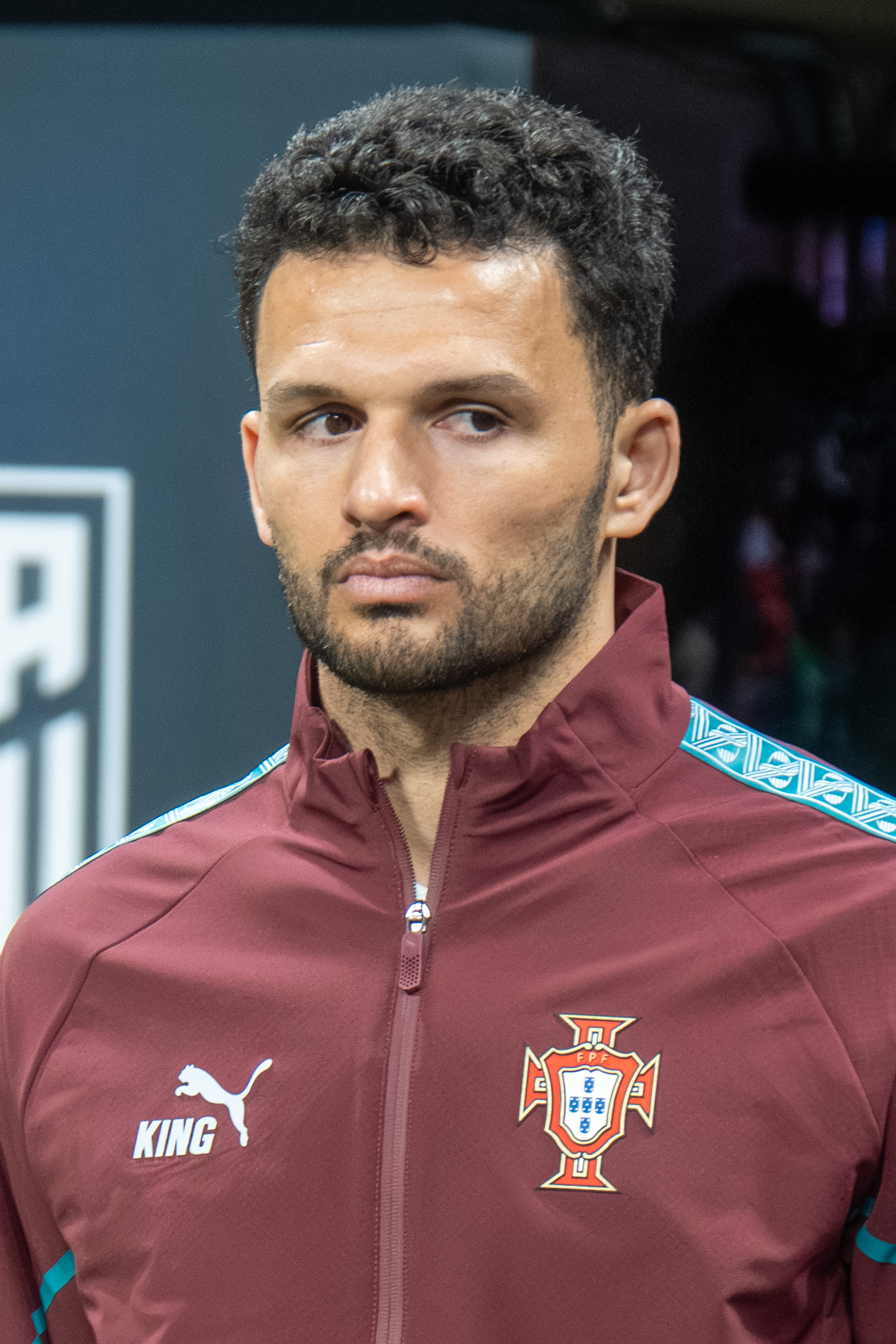
- Ramos with Portugal in 2026

Personal information
- Full name: Gonçalo Matias Ramos
- Date of birth: 20 June 2001 (age 25)
- Place of birth: Olhão, Portugal
- Height: 1.85 m (6 ft 1 in)
- Position: Striker

Team information
- Current team: AC Milan
- Number: 9

Youth career
- 2009–2011: Olhanense
- 2011–2013: Loulé
- 2013–2019: Benfica

Senior career*
Years	Team	Apps	(Gls)
2019–2021	Benfica B	37	(16)
2020–2023	Benfica	64	(30)
2023	→ Paris Saint-Germain (loan)	11	(2)
2023–2026	Paris Saint-Germain	70	(25)
2026–	AC Milan	12	(3)

International career^{‡}
2017–2018	Portugal U17	9	(1)
2018	Portugal U18	2	(0)
2019	Portugal U19	15	(9)
2020	Portugal U20	2	(0)
2020–2022	Portugal U21	18	(14)
2022–	Portugal	33	(14)
Medal record
Men's football
Representing Portugal
UEFA Nations League
Winner	2025 Germany
UEFA European Under-19 Championship
Runner-up	2019 Armenia
UEFA European Under-21 Championship
Runner-up	2021 Hungary–Slovenia
- * Club domestic league appearances and goals as of 18:05, 22 November 2026 (UTC) ‡ National team caps and goals as of 23:10, 17 November 2026 (UTC)

Gonçalo Matias Ramos (Portuguese pronunciation: [ɡõˈsalu ˈʁɐmuʃ]; born 20 June 2001) is a Portuguese professional footballer who plays as a striker for Serie A club AC Milan and the Portugal national team.

Nicknamed "O Pistoleiro" (lit. 'the Gunman'), Ramos came through Benfica's youth academy. He began playing for Benfica B in 2019 and was promoted to the first team a year later. Eventually he established himself as an integral player for the club, helping them win the league title in 2023. He then joined Paris Saint-Germain in 2023, winning several honours, including three Ligue 1 titles as well as two UEFA Champions League titles back-to-back in 2025 and 2026, with the former being part of a continental treble. In 2026, Ramos joined AC Milan for a club record fee.

Ramos is a former Portugal youth international, representing his country at various levels, including the under-19 team that finished as runners-up at the 2019 UEFA European Championship and the under-21 team that finished as runners-up at the 2021 European Championship. He made his senior international debut in 2022, being part of the squad at the 2022 FIFA World Cup, UEFA Euro 2024 and 2026 World Cup.

== Club career ==
=== Early career ===
Born in Olhão, Faro District, Ramos started his football career in the youth ranks of local side Olhanense in 2009, before joining Loulé in 2011. Shortly Ramos had several trials with Sporting CP aged 9, but was rejected due to his slight frame, leading him to join their crosstown rivals youth system Benfica in 2013 at the age of 12.

=== Benfica ===
==== 2019–22: Rise to the first team ====
On 13 January 2019, he made his professional debut with Benfica's reserve team as an 84th-minute substitute for Nuno Tavares in a 3–2 home loss to Braga B in LigaPro. On 21 July 2020, he made his first-team debut with Benfica as an 85th-minute substitute for Pizzi in a 4–0 away win over Desportivo das Aves in the Primeira Liga, netting a brace in 8 minutes. During that season, Ramos played in the 2019–20 UEFA Youth League, in which he was a key part of Benfica reaching the final of the competition, lost to Real Madrid (3–2), in which he scored a brace in the finals; he finished as joint-top scorer in the tournament with eight goals. On 7 October 2020, he agreed to a contract extension to 2025.

After a promising 2020–21 season with the B team, which he scored eleven goals in twelve games, Ramos was given a run in the first-team at the start of the 2021–22 season by manager Jorge Jesus, starting in a 2–0 home victory over Spartak Moscow in the third qualifying round of the UEFA Champions League. Following the arrival of Roman Yaremchuk and the return of Darwin Núñez from injury, Ramos found limited first-team minutes, leading him to pursue a move out of the club in the winter transfer window. With the arrival of interim manager Nélson Veríssimo in January 2022, who had previously coached him at the B team, Ramos began playing more regularly, and reignited his form, scoring seven goals and adding two assists. His versatility enabled him to play in various positions in attack, which the new coach found useful.

On 13 April, he scored his first UEFA Champions League goal in a 3–3 away draw against Liverpool at Anfield in the second leg of the UEFA Champions League quarter-finals tie. In doing so, he became the second youngest player (aged 20 years and 297 days) to score for the club in the final phases of the competition, though Benfica were eliminated after losing to Liverpool 6–4 on aggregate.

==== 2022–23: Breakthrough season and league title ====
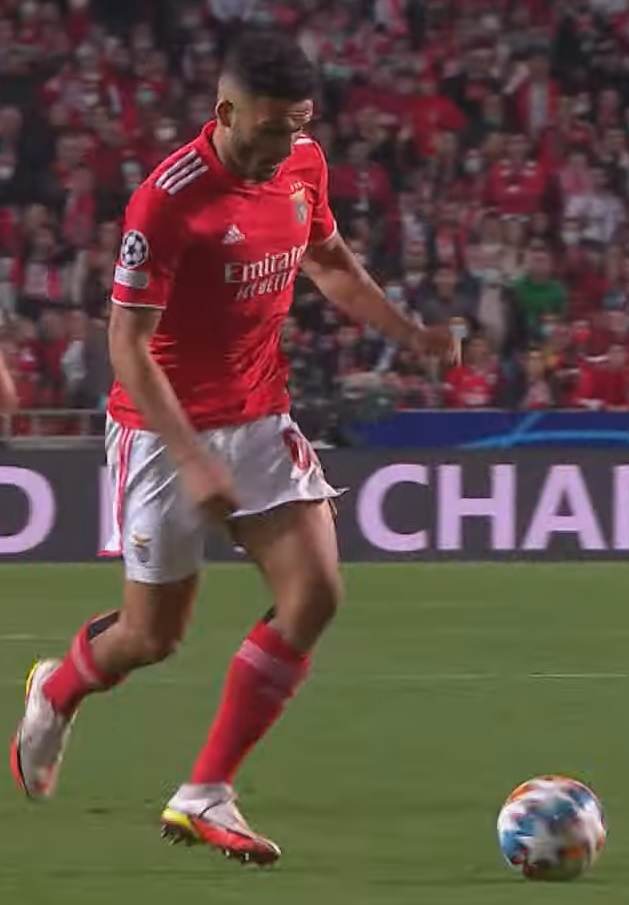
Ramos playing for Benfica in 2022

Ramos began the 2022–23 season by scoring his first career hat-trick on 2 August in a 4–1 home win over Midtjylland in the first leg of the 2022–23 UEFA Champions League third qualifying round. His prolific form saw him score two more goals and provided two assists, as part of a partnership with newly signed teammate David Neres, including a goal and an assist in the 3–0 home win over Dynamo Kiev in the second leg of the 2022–23 UEFA Champions League play-off round, helping his side qualify to the tournament. On 2 November, he scored his first UEFA Champions League goal of the season, opening Benfica's 6–1 away win against Maccabi Haifa in their last 2022–23 UEFA Champions League group stage match, to ensure the club's qualification to the round of sixteen, as group winners. After scoring five goals in five matches, he was named the league's Player of the Month and Forward of the Month for the months of October and November.

On 15 January 2023, Ramos scored a brace to help the hosts secure a 2–2 draw against crosstown rivals Sporting CP in the Lisbon derby, being named man of the match. In doing so, he became the second youngest player (aged 21 years and 183 days) to score a brace in the derby, since António Mendes (aged 21 years and 30 days) in 1958. On 7 March, in the second leg of Champions League round-of-16, Ramos scored a brace in a 5–1 home win against Club Brugge, becoming the youngest Portuguese player (aged 21 years and 260 days) to score twice in a Champions League knockout stage match. On 2 April, he scored the only goal of an away win over Rio Ave, making the youngest player to score 25 goals in a season for Benfica, since Eusébio in the 1962–1963 season. Ramos finished the season with 27 goals for his team, including one on the final day of the league campaign, in a 3–0 win over Santa Clara to seal the title for Benfica, their first title in four years; his 19 league goals put him second for the season.

=== Paris Saint-Germain ===
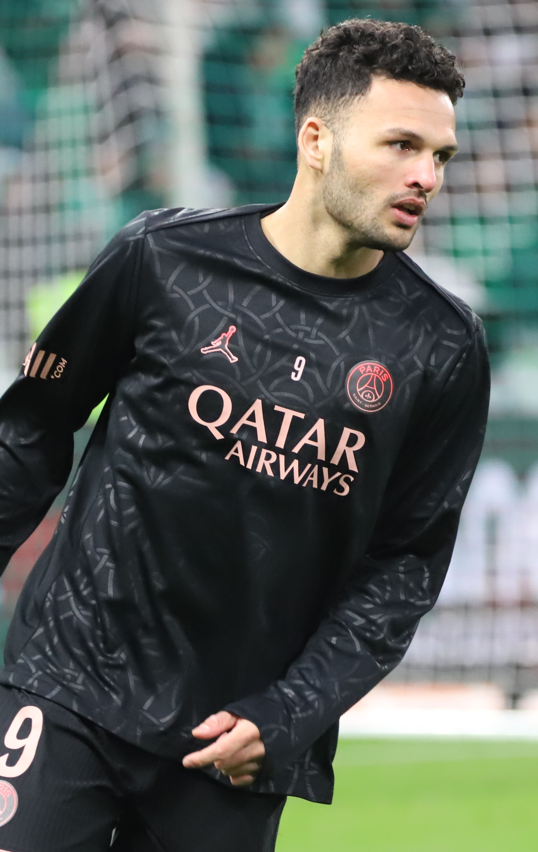
Ramos with Paris Saint-Germain in 2025

==== 2023–24: Debut season and domestic treble ====
On 7 August 2023, Ligue 1 club Paris Saint-Germain announced the signing of Ramos on a season-long loan, having an option-to-buy at the end of the season for a reported fee of €65 million, with an additional €15 million in potential bonuses. Sources claimed that the buy option was mandatory.

Ramos made his debut in a 0–0 draw against Lorient at the Parc des Princes on 12 August. On 24 September, Ramos scored his first two goals for PSG in his sixth appearance in a 4–0 win over Le Classique rivals Marseille, after replacing Kylian Mbappé in the 32nd minute. He also became the first player in Ligue 1 after his teammate Mbappé to score a brace coming off the bench in October 2020. On 22 November, PSG announced that it had exercised its buy option in Ramos's loan deal. He signed a contract with the club until 2028. On 24 November, Ramos scored his first goal since signing permanently with the club in a 5–2 win at home over Monaco.

Shortly after, he caught a virus, which caused him to lose six kilograms, with the situation getting worse in December, leading Ramos to be hospitalised, with PSG requesting Benfica's help in the entire logistics and monitoring his process, which they accepted. The situation was confirmed by PSG's manager Luis Enrique on 19 January 2024, and after recovering, his form improved in the new year, scoring five goals in seven matches including, on 31 March, closing the 2–0 win over Marseille in the Le Classique at Stade Vélodrome, after replacing Kylian Mbappé in the 65th minute. The rest of the season, Ramos served more as a back-up due to his condition, he would score 14 goals in his first season, while helping his team win the domestic treble with record-extending successes in Ligue 1, the Coupe de France, and the Trophée des Champions, while also reaching the Champions League semi-finals.

==== 2024–2026: Consecutive league titles and European champion ====
On 16 August, in PSG's opening match of the new season against Le Havre, after Ramos assisted his side opening goal, he was forced off after sustaining an injury following a challenge from Étienne Youte Kinkoue. After three months, he made his return from injury, on 26 November, replacing Bradley Barcola in the 72nd minute of a 1–0 loss to Bayern Munich in the Champions League league phase. On 10 December, Ramos scored his first Champions League goal for PSG in a 3–0 away win against Red Bull Salzburg.

On 19 February 2025, in the second leg of the Champions League knockout phase play-offs, he got on the scoresheet in a 7–0 win over fellow Ligue 1 side Brest, scoring PSG sixth goal, and helping his side secure a 10–0 aggregate victory to advance to the Champions League round of 16. On 26 February, he scored his first hat-trick for the club, netting three goals in a 7–0 win over Stade Briochin in the quarter-finals of the Coupe de France. Having helped PSG secure their 13th Ligue 1 title, Ramos scored his first Ligue 1 hat-trick on 10 May, netting three goals in a 4–1 away win over Montpellier. At the end of the season, PSG secured their first ever Champions League title and completed a continental treble.

In the 2025 UEFA Super Cup on 13 August, Ramos was put into the field in the 77th minute when Tottenham Hotspur held a 2–1 lead. He scored PSG's second goal in stoppage time, tying the game 2–2, which eventually PSG won 4–3 in a penalty shoot-out, with Ramos scoring PSG's first penalty. On 1 October 2025, Ramos scored the winning goal against Barcelona in a 2–1 Champions League victory. This made him the club's all-time top scorer as a substitute, with 17 goals off the bench. On 1 November, in his 100th match for PSG, he scored a stoppage-time header in a 1–0 win over Nice. During the season, he remained a back-up for PSG as they secured their 12th league title in 14 years, and on 30 May, they won their second consecutive UEFA Champions League title against Arsenal in the final in a penalty shootout, with Ramos scoring the first penalty in the shootout.

=== AC Milan ===
On 30 June 2026, Serie A club AC Milan announced the signing of Ramos for a club-record fee of €74 million plus add-ons. He made his competitive debut for his new club in a 2–1 away win against Torino, on 23 August and scored his first goal in a 2–0 victory over Venezia on 28 August.

== International career ==
=== 2017–2022: Youth level and early senior career ===
With the Portugal under-17s, Ramos participated in the 2018 UEFA European Under-17 Championship in England. In this competition, he played two matches, scoring a goal against Slovenia in a group stage exit. Ramos was part of the Portugal team that finished runners-up to Spain at the 2019 UEFA European Under-19 Championship in Armenia. He was the top scorer with four goals in five appearances, including a hat-trick in a 4–0 win against the Republic of Ireland in the semi-finals. On 12 November 2020, Ramos won his first cap for the under-21 side, scoring the third goal on his debut in a 3–0 victory in Belarus for the 2021 European Championship qualification campaign. In March 2021, Ramos took part in the 2021 UEFA European Under-21 Championship, helping Portugal finish as runners-up, after losing in the final 1–0 to Germany. On 20 September 2022, Ramos was called up to the senior team for the first time, as a replacement for Benfica team-mate Rafa Silva, who retired from international football, for the upcoming 2022–23 UEFA Nations League matches against the Czech Republic and Spain.

=== 2022–present: World Cup debut and Nations League title ===
On 10 November 2022, Ramos was named in Portugal's 26-man squad for the 2022 FIFA World Cup in Qatar. He made his senior debut in a friendly match against Nigeria on 17 November, scoring the third goal and assisting the fourth in a 4–0 victory. On 6 December, Portugal manager Fernando Santos started Ramos ahead of Cristiano Ronaldo in the team's round of 16 game against Switzerland. Ramos scored a hat-trick and provided an assist in Portugal's 6–1 victory, becoming the first player to score a World Cup knockout stage hat-trick since Tomáš Skuhravý in 1990. He also became the first player to score a hat-trick in his first World Cup start since Miroslav Klose in 2002. Portugal employed the same strategy in the quarter-finals against Morocco, with Ramos starting once again, but Portugal lost 1–0, being eliminated from the tournament.

Following the World Cup, with the arrival of new manager Roberto Martínez, Ramos lost his place to Ronaldo in Portugal's squad for the UEFA Euro 2024 qualifiers against Liechtenstein and Luxembourg. After Ronaldo was suspended in a qualifier match against Slovakia, Ramos was given a chance to score brace in Portugal's 9–0 home defeat of Luxembourg on 11 September, Portugal's biggest win in international history. On 13 October, Ramos scored the opening goal in a 3–2 win over Slovakia, leading Portugal to qualify for Euro 2024, marking the nation's fastest qualification to a major tournament in their history.

Ramos with Portugal at the 2026 FIFA World Cup

On 21 May 2024, he was named in Portugal's squad for final tournament in Germany, where Portugal was eliminated from the tournament by France in the quarter-finals, after losing 5–3 in a penalty shootout.

In May 2025, Ramos was selected for Portugal's 2025 UEFA Nations League Finals squad. He and his team would go on to win the tournament 5–3 in a penalty shootout over rivals Spain, with Ramos scoring Portugal's first penalty.

On 19 May 2026, Ramos was selected in the 26-man squad for the 2026 FIFA World Cup. He scored a stoppage-time goal in a 2–1 victory over Croatia in the Round of 32, securing his country's qualification for the Round of 16.

== Style of play ==
Ramos is capable of playing in several offensive positions, such as a striker, or second striker. He usually drops deep to help his team build their attacking play by bringing his teammates into play and creating chances for other players. Due to his awareness and willingness to follow instructions, he understands how to rotate positions in ways in which to benefit the ball-holder with his movement, short or long passes. When he is offering short, he aims to be positive in his control of the ball, he attempts to open his body up each time, with either foot, being able to hold up the ball and act as his team focal point in attack.

During his second season at Benfica, under Roger Schmidt, Ramos was used as a striker in a 4–2–3–1 formation. His ability to attack space and create further space both inside and outside the penalty area with his movement is what made the move to the centre a more natural progression. Ramos is good at picking up positions between the opposition's defenders and then exploiting space behind the defensive line. He presses with intent and is not afraid to put himself about against the opposition. Ramos usually links up with the midfield and makes proactive movements which always can put a striker in a goal-scoring position more often rather than standing around and waiting for the service, similar to Karim Benzema.

== Personal life ==
Ramos' father, Manuel Ramos, originally from Amareleja, Beja District, is also a former Portugal youth international who represented Farense among other Portuguese clubs.

== Career statistics ==
=== Club ===
As of match played 22 November 2026

Appearances and goals by club, season and competition
Club	Season	League			National cup (Note: Includes Taça de Portugal, Coupe de France, Coppa Italia)		League cup (Note: Includes Taça da Liga)		Europe		Other		Total	
Club	Season	Division	Apps	Goals	Apps	Goals	Apps	Goals	Apps	Goals	Apps	Goals	Apps	Goals
Benfica B	2018–19	LigaPro	5	1	—		—		—		—		5	1
Benfica B	2019–20	LigaPro	20	4	—		—		—		—		20	4
Benfica B	2020–21	LigaPro	12	11	—		—		—		—		12	11
Benfica B	Total		37	16	—		—		—		—		37	16
Benfica	2019–20	Primeira Liga	1	2	0	0	0	0	0	0	0	0	1	2
Benfica	2020–21	Primeira Liga	4	2	5	2	1	0	2 (Note: Appearances in UEFA Europa League)	0	0	0	12	4
Benfica	2021–22	Primeira Liga	29	7	2	0	4	0	11 (Note: Appearances in UEFA Champions League)	1	—		46	8
Benfica	2022–23	Primeira Liga	30	19	2	0	1	1	14	7	—		47	27
Benfica	Total		64	30	9	2	6	1	27	8	—		106	41
Paris Saint-Germain (loan)	2023–24	Ligue 1	11	2	—		—		4	0	—		15	2
Paris Saint-Germain	2023–24	Ligue 1	18	9	4	3	—		3	0	0	0	25	12
Paris Saint-Germain	2024–25	Ligue 1	22	10	6	5	—		12	3	6 (Note: One appearance in Trophée des Champions, five appearances and one goal in FIFA Club World Cup)	1	46	19
Paris Saint-Germain	2025–26	Ligue 1	30	6	2	2	—		11	2	2 (Note: One appearance and one goal in UEFA Super Cup, one appearance and one goal in Trophée des Champions)	2	45	12
Paris Saint-Germain	PSG total		81	27	12	10	—		30	5	8	3	131	45
AC Milan	2026–27	Serie A	12	3	0	0	—		3	1	—		15	4
Career total			194	76	21	12	6	1	60	14	8	3	289	106

=== International ===
As of match played 17 November 2026

Appearances and goals by national team and year
National team	Year	Apps	Goals
Portugal	2022	5	4
Portugal	2023	5	3
Portugal	2024	4	1
Portugal	2025	8	2
Portugal	2026	12	4
Total		33	14

As of match played 4 October 2026
Portugal score listed first, score column indicates score after each Ramos goal.

List of international goals scored by Gonçalo Ramos
No.	Date	Venue	Cap	Opponent	Score	Result	Competition
1	17 November 2022	Estádio José Alvalade, Lisbon, Portugal	1	Nigeria	3–0	4–0	Friendly
2	6 December 2022	Lusail Stadium, Lusail, Qatar	4	Switzerland	1–0	6–1	2022 FIFA World Cup
3	6 December 2022	Lusail Stadium, Lusail, Qatar	4	Switzerland	3–0	6–1	2022 FIFA World Cup
4	6 December 2022	Lusail Stadium, Lusail, Qatar	4	Switzerland	5–1	6–1	2022 FIFA World Cup
5	11 September 2023	Estádio Algarve, Faro/Loulé, Portugal	8	Luxembourg	2–0	9–0	UEFA Euro 2024 qualifying
6	11 September 2023	Estádio Algarve, Faro/Loulé, Portugal	8	Luxembourg	3–0	9–0	UEFA Euro 2024 qualifying
7	13 October 2023	Estádio do Dragão, Porto, Portugal	9	Slovakia	1–0	3–2	UEFA Euro 2024 qualifying
8	21 March 2024	Estádio D. Afonso Henriques, Guimarães, Portugal	11	Sweden	5–1	5–2	Friendly
9	23 March 2025	Estádio José Alvalade, Lisbon, Portugal	15	Denmark	5–2	5–2 (a.e.t.)	2024–25 UEFA Nations League A
10	16 November 2025	Estádio do Dragão, Porto, Portugal	22	Armenia	2–1	9–1	2026 FIFA World Cup qualification
11	2 July 2026	BMO Field, Toronto, Canada	27	Croatia	2–1	2–1	2026 FIFA World Cup
12	27 September 2026	Ullevaal Stadion, Oslo, Norway	29	Norway	2–1	2–1	2026–27 UEFA Nations League A
13	1 October 2026	Parken Stadium, Copenhagen, Denmark	30	Denmark	2–1	4–2	2026–27 UEFA Nations League A
14	4 October 2026	Estádio do Dragão, Porto, Portugal	31	Norway	2–1	2–1	2026–27 UEFA Nations League A

== Honours ==
Benfica

- Primeira Liga: 2022–23

Paris Saint-Germain

- Ligue 1: 2023–24, 2024–25, 2025–26
- Coupe de France: 2023–24, 2024–25
- Trophée des Champions: 2023, 2024, 2025
- UEFA Champions League: 2024–25, 2025–26
- UEFA Super Cup: 2025
- FIFA Intercontinental Cup: 2025
- FIFA Club World Cup runner-up: 2025

Portugal U19

- UEFA European Under-19 Championship runner-up: 2019

Portugal U21

- UEFA European Under-21 Championship runner-up: 2021

Portugal

- UEFA Nations League: 2024–25

Individual

- UEFA European Under-19 Championship Golden Boot: 2019
- UEFA Youth League Top Scorer: 2019–20
- Cosme Damião Awards – Revelation of the Year: 2021
- Primeira Liga's Player of the Month: October/November 2022, March 2023
- Primeira Liga Team of the Year: 2022–23
- SJPF Young Player of the Month: March 2022, August/September 2022
