= Bradley Barcola =

French footballer (born 2002)

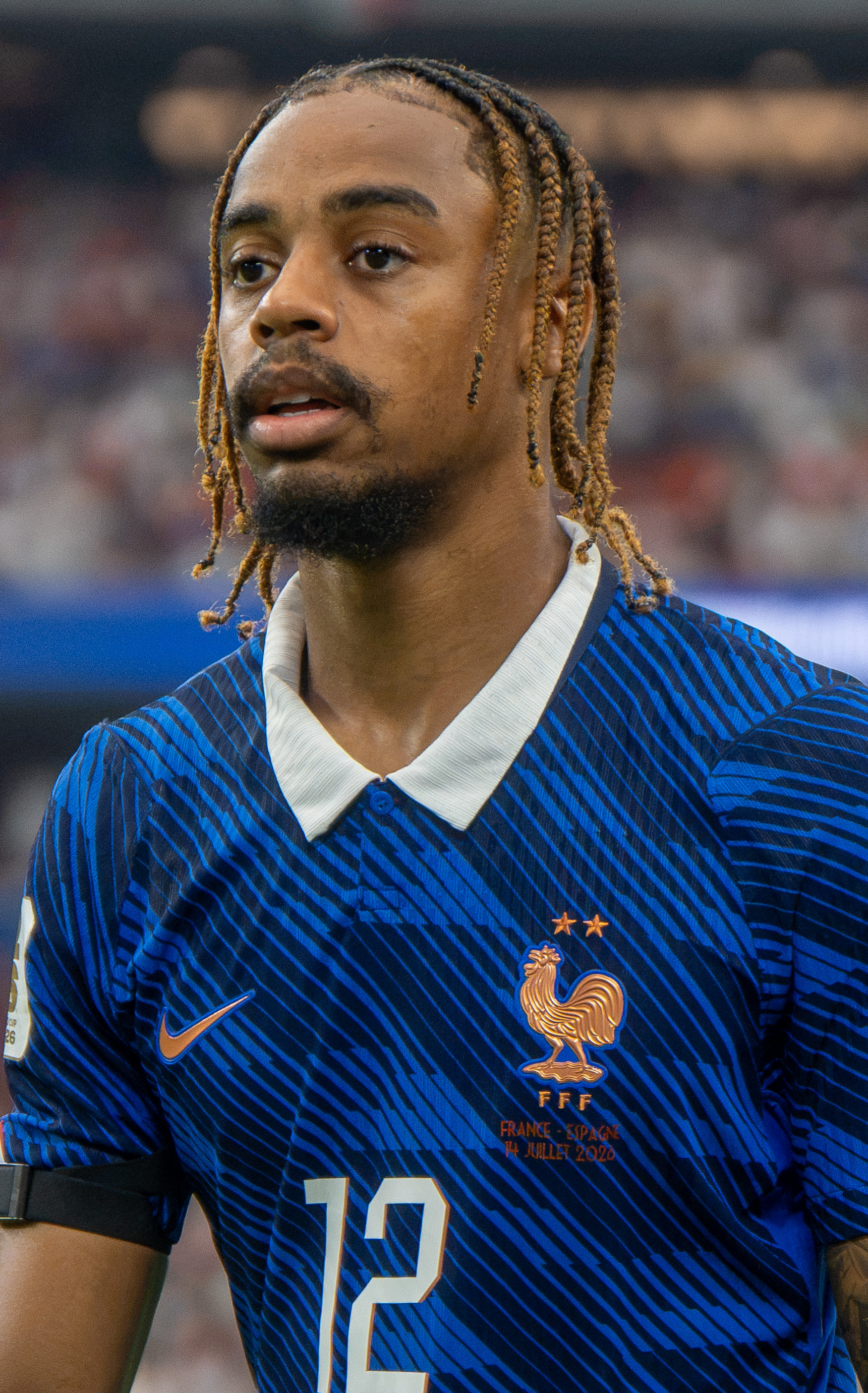
- Barcola with France in 2026

Personal information
- Full name: Bradley Jean-Manuel Essolisam Addo Barcola
- Date of birth: 2 September 2002 (age 24)
- Place of birth: Villeurbanne, France
- Height: 1.82 m (6 ft 0 in)
- Position: Forward

Team information
- Current team: Liverpool
- Number: 29

Youth career
- 2008–2010: AS Buers Villeurbanne
- 2010–2021: Lyon

Senior career*
Years	Team	Apps	(Gls)
2020–2023	Lyon II	22	(5)
2021–2023	Lyon	40	(5)
2023–2026	Paris Saint-Germain	88	(29)
2026–	Liverpool	9	(3)

International career^{‡}
2022	France U20	1	(0)
2023–2024	France U21	12	(4)
2024	France Olympic	1	(0)
2024–	France	34	(6)
Medal record
Men's football
Representing France
UEFA Nations League
Third place	2025
- * Club domestic league appearances and goals as of 18:38, 22 November 2026 (UTC) ‡ National team caps and goals as of 21:43, 15 November 2026 (UTC)

Bradley Jean-Manuel Essolisam Addo Barcola (Note: French: [bʁɑdlɛ bɑʁkɔlɑ]) (born 2 September 2002) is a French professional footballer who plays as a forward for Premier League club Liverpool and the France national team. He is known for his speed, agility and dribbling.

After coming up through Lyon's academy, Barcola began his professional career with his boyhood club, where he would play two seasons, the latter of which he broke out into the starting squad, leading the club in assists. In 2023, he signed for Paris Saint-Germain for a €67 million transfer fee, where he went on to win the UEFA Champions League as part of a continental treble in 2025. He won a second consecutive Champions League title with the club in 2026, before signing for Liverpool in the summer of the same year.

Barcola played youth international football for France at under-21 and Olympic levels. He made his senior international debut in June 2024, and was a member of the France squad for UEFA Euro 2024 and the 2026 FIFA World Cup.

== Early life ==
Bradley Jean-Manuel Essolisam Addo Barcola was born on 2 September 2002 in Villeurbanne, a commune in the Metropolis of Lyon, to a French mother and Togolese father. His brother Malcolm is also a footballer, and plays for the Togo national team. He started playing football in his home town, before joining Lyon at the age of eight.

== Club career ==
=== Lyon ===
During the 2020–21 season Barcola started playing with the Lyon reserve in National 2 while also being a prolific goalscorer with the under-19 who played in the UEFA Youth League, before signing a junior contract in January 2021.

After being called up to the Lyon first team by Peter Bosz during the 2021–22 pre-season—scoring his first goal against Bourg-en-Bresse— Barcola signed his first professional contract in September 2021, tying him to the club until 2024.

Barcola made his professional debut for Lyon on 4 November 2021, replacing Rayan Cherki at the 81st minute of a 3–0 home win against Sparta Prague in the group stage of the UEFA Europa League. He managed to provide an assist for Karl Toko Ekambi on Lyon's third goal, helping his side to a win that would make them the first team to officially qualify for this edition round of 16.

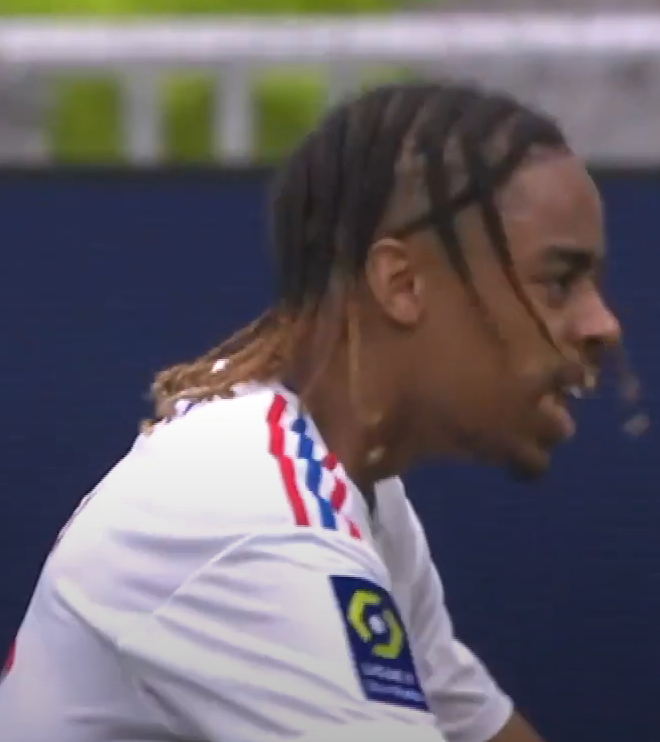
Barcola with Lyon in 2023

In January 2023, due to lack of game time with Lyon, Barcola was keen on joining Swiss team St. Gallen on loan. However, the deal collapsed as Lyon were short of attackers after the injury of Alexandre Lacazette and the departure of Karl Toko Ekambi, which resulted in the integration of Barcola into Les Gones rotation. Having more playing time during the second half of the 2022–23 season, Barcola contributed to Lyon's front line alongside top scorer Alexandre Lacazette. On 2 April 2023, he scored the only goal to help Lyon defeat the league leader Paris Saint-Germain at the Parc des Princes. A month later, on 7 May 2023, he assisted three goals for Lyon and Lacazette for a comeback win against Montpellier in a nine-goal thriller, canceling out four goals scored by striker Elye Wahi. Barcola ended the season with 7 goals and 9 assists across all competitions, being the second most decisive player of the club behind Lacazette.

=== Paris Saint-Germain ===
On 31 August 2023, Barcola joined fellow Ligue 1 club Paris Saint-Germain (PSG) for a reported €45 million fee, signing a five-year contract with the club. He was assigned the number 29 jersey. On 3 September, Barcola made his debut as a substitute in a 4–1 away win over his former club Lyon. He became the 500th player to make an appearance for Paris Saint-Germain. On 24 September, Barcola made his first start for PSG in a 4–0 win over Le Classique rivals Marseille. On 29 October, he recorded his first goal contribution for the club, an assist for Warren Zaïre-Emery's opening goal in a 3–2 away win over Brest. On 9 December, Barcola scored his first goal for PSG in a 2–1 win over Nantes.

On 14 February 2024, Barcola scored his first UEFA Champions League goal in a 2–0 victory over Real Sociedad in the first leg of the round of 16. On 16 April 2024, after his performance in a 4–1 away victory over Barcelona in the Champions League quarter-finals second leg, Barcola was highly praised in the media. He gave an assist to Ousmane Dembélé for the equalizing goal in the match, and was key throughout as Paris overturned a 3–2 deficit from the first leg. Barcola finished the 2023–24 season with five goals and eight assists in thirty-nine appearances for PSG. On 10 June 2024, he was named by Ligue 1 as the signing of the season.

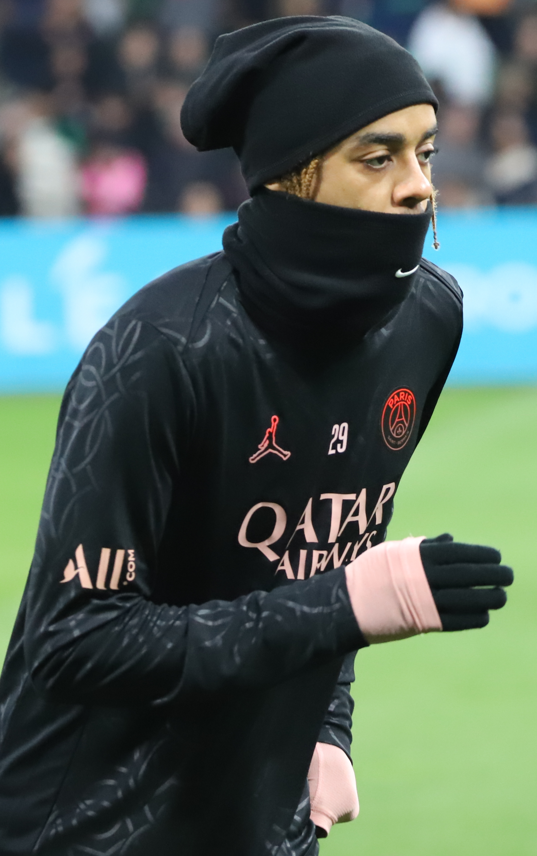
Barcola training with Paris Saint-Germain in 2025

On 16 August 2024, Barcola scored his first goal of the season in PSG's Ligue 1 opener away to Le Havre, an eventual 4–1 victory for the Parisians. On 23 August, he scored the first brace of his career in a 6–0 win over Montpellier at the Parc des Princes. On 22 January 2025, Barcola scored a goal and provided an assist in a 4–2 victory over Manchester City. In a 4–1 win over Rennes on 8 March 2025, he recorded a goal and an assist, bringing his Ligue 1 tally to 20 goal contributions in a single season for the first time in his career. Barcola helped PSG win a 13th Ligue 1 title and finished the season as the league's second-highest assist provider, with 10 assists, just one behind Rayan Cherki. In the Coupe de France final on 24 May 2025, he scored two goals and provided an assist in a 3–0 victory over Reims. One week later in the Champions League final against Inter Milan, he assisted Senny Mayulu's goal, the fifth of a 5–0 victory, winning the competition for the first time in PSG's history and in his career. Barcola made his 100th official appearance for PSG in a 4–0 win over Inter Miami in the round of 16 of the 2025 FIFA Club World Cup; this was also his 61st appearance for PSG in the 2024–25 season, surpassing Valère Germain's record for most matches in a single season with a Ligue 1 club. In the following season, he won his second Champions League title with the club, following a penalty-shootout victory over Arsenal in the final.

=== Liverpool ===
On 31 August 2026, Barcola moved to the Premier League, signing a five-year contract with Liverpool for a reported fee of £106 million (€125 million), with a further £17 million (€20 million) in potential add-ons. He was assigned the No. 29 shirt, retaining the number he had worn at Paris Saint-Germain. On 4 September 2026, Barcola made his debut for Liverpool as a substitute in a 2–0 Premier League win against Ipswich Town at Portman Road. On 14 October 2026, Barcola scored his first goal for Liverpool in a 6–3 win over LASK in the UEFA Champions League at Raiffeisen Arena; he went on to complete a hat-trick in the same match, which was also his first ever career hat-trick.

== International career ==
=== Youth ===
Barcola was first selected with France under-18 in January 2020 to play two friendly matches. However, he did not appear as most junior encounters were cancelled due to COVID-19 during the following seasons. His club at the time, Paris Saint-Germain, denied him permission to compete in the 2024 Summer Olympics on home soil, along with his teammate Warren Zaïre-Emery.

=== Senior ===
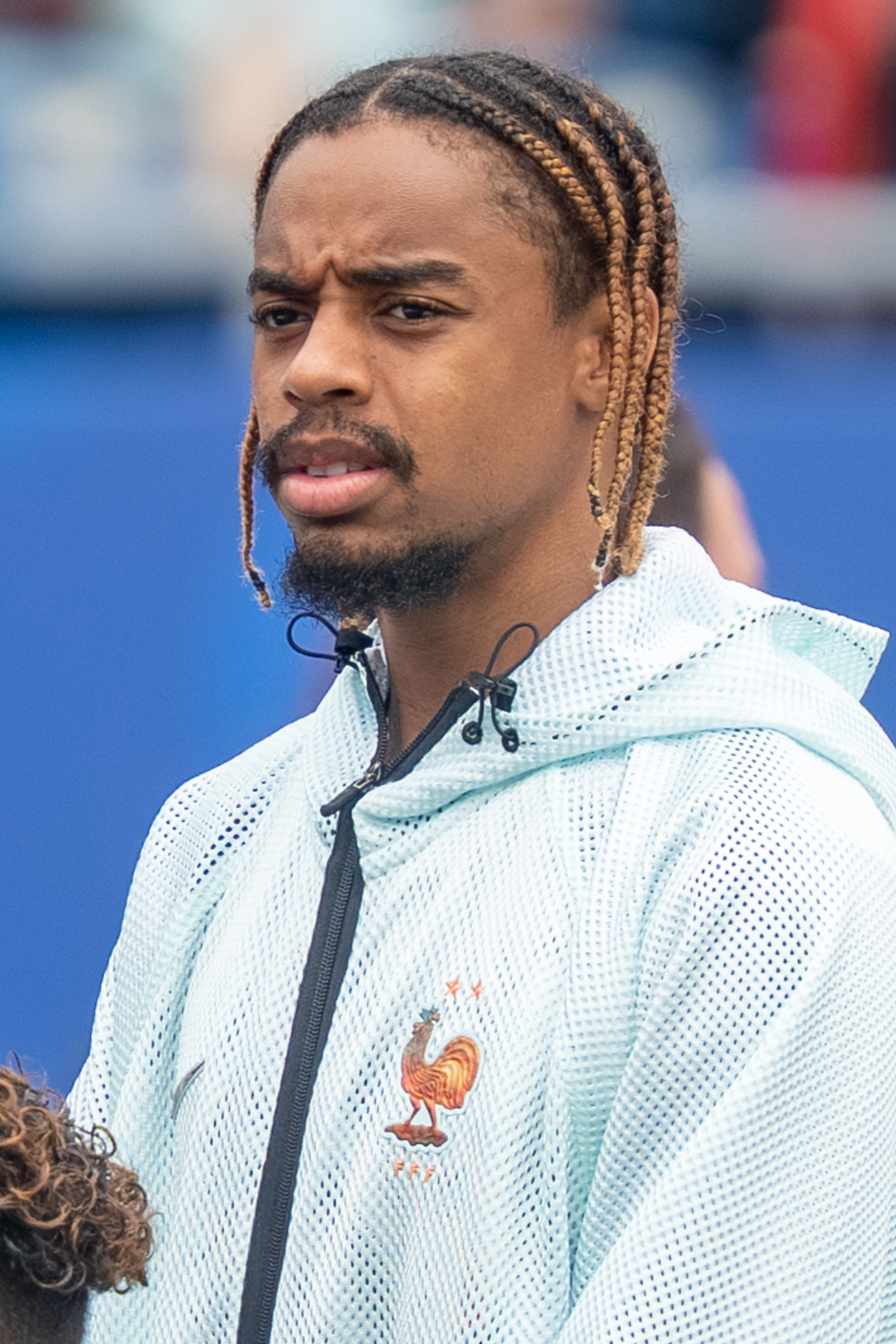
Barcola with France at the 2026 FIFA World Cup

On 16 May 2024, Barcola received his first call-up to the France national team for UEFA Euro 2024. On 5 June 2024, he debuted as a substitute for Marcus Thuram at the 81st minute of a 3–0 friendly victory against Luxembourg at Stade Saint-Symphorien in Metz. Barcola recorded his first goal contribution for France by assisting Kylian Mbappé's goal, the third of the match. On 25 June 2024, Barcola made his first start for France on the occasion of his Euro 2024 debut, an eventual 1–1 draw with Poland in the third group stage match. He made two additional appearances as a substitute in the competition: 15 minutes against Portugal in the quarter-finals, and 30 minutes against Spain in the semi-finals, which ended in a 2–1 defeat. Despite his limited playing time, Barcola was praised for making a "strong impression" during the tournament.

On 6 September 2024, at the Parc des Princes, during a UEFA Nations League match against Italy, Barcola scored his first international goal just 12 seconds into the game, setting the record for the fastest goal scored by France in the past 90 years, as well as the fastest goal conceded by Italy. He scored his second international goal against Israel later in the next month in the same competition.

On 14 May 2026, Barcola was selected in the 26-man squad for the 2026 FIFA World Cup. On 16 June 2026, he scored his first World Cup goal in France's opening victory against Senegal. In the round of 32 on 30 June, he scored France's second goal in a 3–0 win over Sweden. On 18 July, Barcola scored a goal against England in the third place playoff game, which England won by a score of 6–4.

== Style of play ==
Barcola is a versatile forward who can play on either side of a front three or as a centre forward. Although naturally right-footed, he prefers playing on the left, enabling him to take on opponents one-on-one, cut inside onto his stronger foot, and either shoot, create chances for teammates, or make attacking runs into the box.

Barcola has mentioned drawing inspiration from players like Cristiano Ronaldo and Pierre-Emerick Aubameyang; in 2020, he stated that he believes his playing style is similar to theirs.

== Personal life ==
Barcola holds French and Togolese nationalities. He wears the number 29 professionally at club level due to his inspiration from the fictional FIFA series character Alex Hunter, who wore the number 29. He has worn it for Lyon, PSG and currently Liverpool.

== Career statistics ==
=== Club ===
As of match played 22 November 2026

Appearances and goals by club, season and competition
Club	Season	League			National cup (Note: Includes Coupe de France, FA Cup)		League cup (Note: Includes EFL Cup)		Europe		Other		Total	
Club	Season	Division	Apps	Goals	Apps	Goals	Apps	Goals	Apps	Goals	Apps	Goals	Apps	Goals
Lyon II	2020–21	National 2	4	2	—		—		—		—		4	2
Lyon II	2021–22	National 2	14	3	—		—		—		—		14	3
Lyon II	2022–23	National 2	4	0	—		—		—		—		4	0
Lyon II	Total		22	5	—		—		—		—		22	5
Lyon	2021–22	Ligue 1	11	0	0	0	—		2 (Note: Appearances in UEFA Europa League)	0	—		13	0
Lyon	2022–23	Ligue 1	26	5	5	2	—		—		—		31	7
Lyon	2023–24	Ligue 1	3	0	—		—		—		—		3	0
Lyon	Total		40	5	5	2	—		2	0	—		47	7
Paris Saint-Germain	2023–24	Ligue 1	25	4	3	0	—		10 (Note: Appearances in UEFA Champions League)	1	1 (Note: Appearance in Trophée des Champions)	0	39	5
Paris Saint-Germain	2024–25	Ligue 1	34	14	6	4	—		17	3	7 (Note: One appearance in Trophée des Champions, six appearances in FIFA Club World Cup)	0	64	21
Paris Saint-Germain	2025–26	Ligue 1	29	11	1	0	—		16	2	3 (Note: One appearance in UEFA Super Cup, one appearance in FIFA Intercontinental Cup, one appearance in Trophée des Champions)	0	49	13
Paris Saint-Germain	Total		88	29	10	4	—		43	6	11	0	152	39
Liverpool	2026–27	Premier League	9	0	0	0	2	0	4	3	—		15	3
Career total			159	39	15	6	2	0	49	9	11	0	236	54

=== International ===
As of match played 15 November 2026

Appearances and goals by national team and year
National team	Year	Apps	Goals
France	2024	11	2
France	2025	7	1
France	2026	16	3
Total		34	6

As of match played 15 November 2026
France score listed first, score column indicates score after each Barcola goal

List of international goals scored by Bradley Barcola
No.	Date	Venue	Cap	Opponent	Score	Result	Competition	Ref.
1	6 September 2024	Parc des Princes, Paris, France	6	Italy	1–0	1–3	2024–25 UEFA Nations League A	
2	10 October 2024	Bozsik Aréna, Budapest, Hungary	8	Israel	4–1	4–1	2024–25 UEFA Nations League A	
3	9 September 2025	Parc des Princes, Paris, France	16	Iceland	2–1	2–1	2026 FIFA World Cup qualification	
4	16 June 2026	MetLife Stadium, East Rutherford, United States	21	Senegal	2–0	3–1	2026 FIFA World Cup	
5	30 June 2026	MetLife Stadium, East Rutherford, United States	24	Sweden	2–0	3–0	2026 FIFA World Cup	
6	18 July 2026	Hard Rock Stadium, Miami Gardens, United States	28	England	2–4	4–6	2026 FIFA World Cup	

== Honours ==
Paris Saint-Germain

- Ligue 1: 2023–24, 2024–25, 2025–26
- Coupe de France: 2023–24, 2024–25
- Trophée des Champions: 2023, 2024, 2025
- UEFA Champions League: 2024–25, 2025–26
- UEFA Super Cup: 2025, 2026
- FIFA Intercontinental Cup: 2025
- FIFA Club World Cup runner-up: 2025

France

- UEFA Nations League third place: 2024–25

Individual

- UNFP Ligue 1 Player of the Month: September 2024
- UNFP Ligue 1 Team of the Year: 2024–25
