= Sékou Doucouré =

Footballer (born 2005)

Personal information
- Full name: Sékou Doucouré
- Date of birth: 26 April 2005 (age 21)
- Place of birth: Créteil, France
- Height: 1.87 m (6 ft 2 in)
- Position: Centre-back

Team information
- Current team: Nantes
- Number: 72

Youth career
- 2012–2015: CA Paris-Charenton
- 2015–2018: RC Joinville
- 2018–2024: Paris Saint-Germain

Senior career*
Years	Team	Apps	(Gls)
2024–	Nantes B	15	(0)
2025–	Nantes	3	(0)

International career^{‡}
2025–	Mali U23	1	(1)
- * Club domestic league appearances and goals as of 17:14, 4 January 2026 (UTC) ‡ National team caps and goals as of 14:52, 15 November 2025 (UTC)

Sékou Doucouré (born 26 April 2005) is a professional footballer who plays as a centre-back for Ligue 2 club Nantes. Born in France, he represents Mali at youth international level.

== Club career ==
Born in Créteil, Doucouré grew up in Charenton-le-Pont, where he played football in the nearby Bois de Vincennes. He joined the local club at the age of seven before signing for RC Joinville in 2015. In 2018, Doucouré entered the youth academy of Paris Saint-Germain. During the 2023–24 season, he was part of Zoumana Camara's under-19 squad that won the Championnat National U19 title.

On 10 August 2024, Doucouré signed his first professional contract with Nantes, a season-long deal with an option to extend for two seasons. He initially joined the club's reserve team. On 15 March 2025, he made his professional and Ligue 1 debut for Nantes as a late-match substitute in a 1–0 win over Lille.

== International career ==
In November 2025, Doucoré was called up for the first time in Mali under-23 team. He made his appearance and scored his first goal in a 3–0 win over Indonesia.

== Personal life ==
Born in France, Doucouré is of Malian descent.

On 2 June 2021, he took part in the final of the national public speaking competition for youth academies of French professional football clubs. The event, held at the Ministry of Sports and organized by Fondaction du Football and Prométhée Education, featured 11 finalists from 10 clubs. Doucouré represented Paris Saint-Germain.

== Career statistics ==
As of match played 4 January 2026

Appearances and goals by club, season and competition
Club	Season	League			Cup		Europe		Other		Total	
Club	Season	Division	Apps	Goals	Apps	Goalss	Apps	Goals	Apps	Goals	Apps	Goals
Nantes B	2024–25	National 3	15	0	—		—		—		15	0
Nantes B	2025–26	National 3	0	0	—		—		—		0	0
Nantes B	Total		15	0	—		—		—		15	0
Nantes	2024–25	Ligue 1	2	0	0	0	—		—		2	0
Nantes	2025–26	Ligue 1	1	0	0	0	—		—		1	0
Nantes	Total		3	0	0	0	—		—		3	0
Career total			18	0	0	0	0	0	0	0	18	0

== Honours ==
Paris Saint-Germain U19

- Championnat National U19: 2023–24
