= Lucas Lavallée =

French footballer (born 2003)

Personal information
- Date of birth: 18 February 2003 (age 23)
- Place of birth: Armentières, France
- Height: 1.90 m (6 ft 3 in)
- Position: Goalkeeper

Team information
- Current team: Saint-Étienne
- Number: 40

Youth career
- 2009–2016: SC Bailleulois
- 2016–2018: Dunkerque
- 2018–2021: Lille
- 2021–2022: Paris Saint-Germain

Senior career*
Years	Team	Apps	(Gls)
2020	Lille B	3	(0)
2022–2023	Paris Saint-Germain B	16	(0)
2022–2025	Paris Saint-Germain	0	(0)
2023–2024	→ Dunkerque (loan)	0	(0)
2024–2025	→ Aubagne (loan)	15	(0)
2025–2026	Châteauroux	31	(0)
2026–	Saint-Étienne	0	(0)

International career
2019	France U16	4	(0)
2019–2020	France U17	3	(0)
- * Club domestic league appearances and goals as of 23 June 2026

Lucas Lavallée (born 18 February 2003) is a French professional footballer who plays as a goalkeeper for Ligue 2 club Saint-Étienne.

== Club career ==
Although initially expected to sign his first professional contract with Lille, on 9 June 2021, Lavallée joined Paris Saint-Germain (PSG) on a three-year professional contract. On 28 November 2021, he was called up to PSG's senior team for the first time by head coach Mauricio Pochettino for an away match against Saint-Étienne. In the 2022–23 season, Lavallée was one of five youth players training weekly with the first team as part of the "elite group", alongside El Chadaille Bitshiabu, Ismaël Gharbi, Ilyes Housni, and Warren Zaïre-Emery. On 19 July 2023, he extended his contract with PSG to 2026 and joined Ligue 2 club Dunkerque, where he used to play in his youth, on a season-long loan. On 20 August 2024, Lavallée signed for Championnat National club Aubagne on loan until the end of the season.

On 25 July 2025, Lavallée signed for Championnat National club Châteauroux on a two-year contract.

== International career ==
Lavallée has represented France at youth international level. He made his first appearances at under-16 level in 2019. On 10 May 2023, Lavallée was called up to the under-20s to participate in the 2023 FIFA U-20 World Cup.

== Career statistics ==
As of 1 June 2025

Appearances and goals by club, season and competition
Club	Season	League			Cup		Total	
Club	Season	Division	Apps	Goals	Apps	Goals	Apps	Goals
Lille B	2020–21	National 3	3	0	—		3	0
Paris Saint-Germain B	2022–23	National 3	16	0	—		16	0
Dunkerque (loan)	2023–24	Ligue 2	0	0	3	0	3	0
Aubagne (loan)	2024–25	National	15	0	0	0	15	0
Châteauroux	2025–26	National	0	0	0	0	0	0
Career total			34	0	3	0	37	0

== Honours ==
Paris Saint-Germain

- FIFA Club World Cup runner-up: 2025
