= Louis Mouquet =

Footballer (born 2004)

Personal information
- Full name: Louis Moise Nascimento Mouquet
- Date of birth: 21 July 2004 (age 22)
- Place of birth: Bayeux, France
- Height: 1.87 m (6 ft 2 in)
- Position: Goalkeeper

Team information
- Current team: Padova
- Number: 1

Youth career
- 2010–2023: Paris Saint-Germain

Senior career*
| Years | Team | Apps | (Gls) |
| 2022 | Paris Saint-Germain B | 1 | (0) |
| 2023–2025 | Paris Saint-Germain | 0 | (0) |
| 2025– | Padova | 0 | (0) |

International career^{‡}
| 2021 | Portugal U18 | 2 | (0) |
| 2022–2024 | Portugal U20 | 4 | (0) |
- * Club domestic league appearances and goals as of 02:43, 23 August 2025 (UTC) ‡ National team caps and goals as of 26 March 2024

Louis Moise Nascimento Mouquet (born 21 July 2004) is a professional footballer who plays as a goalkeeper for Serie B club Padova. Born in France, he has represented Portugal at youth international level.

== Club career ==
Mouquet joined the youth academy of Paris Saint-Germain in 2010 at the age of six. On 2 June 2022, he signed his first professional contract with the club until June 2025. In May 2025, it was confirmed that Mouquet would leave PSG at the end of his contract the following month.

On 14 August 2025, Mouquet signed for Serie B club Padova on a contract until 30 June 2028.

== International career ==
Mouquet has represented Portugal at different youth levels.

== Style of play ==
A right-footed goalkeeper, Mouquet is known for his reflexes.

== Personal life ==
Mouquet was born in France to a French father and a Portuguese mother. He has obtained baccalauréat in mathematics.
