= 2023 Trophée des Champions =

- The Parc des Princes in Paris hosted the match
- Event: Trophée des Champions
Paris Saint-Germain	Toulouse
2	0
- Date: 3 January 2024
- Venue: Parc des Princes, Paris, France
- Man of the Match: Lee Kang-in (Paris Saint-Germain)
- Referee: Hakim Ben El Hadj
- Attendance: 43,792

The 2023 Trophée des Champions was the 28th edition of the French super cup. The match was contested by the 2022–23 Ligue 1 champions, Paris Saint-Germain, and the 2022–23 Coupe de France winners, Toulouse.

Paris Saint-Germain won the match 2–0 for their record twelfth Trophée des Champions title.

== Host selection ==
On 23 March 2023, the Ligue de Football Professionnel (LFP) decided that the match would take place at the Rajamangala Stadium in Bangkok, Thailand. The fixture was scheduled for 5 August 2023. However, on 5 June 2023, LFP president Vincent Labrune confirmed that the match would not take place in Thailand, reportedly due to Thai organizer Fresh Air Festival backing out. Labrune stated that this was "a bad for a good", as it allowed for the match to be moved to a "more favorable date, [in] the beginning of January". On 2 October 2023, it was reported that the match would take place on 3 January 2024 in either Saudi Arabia or Qatar. On 1 December 2023, the LFP instead confirmed that the match would take place at the Parc des Princes in Paris, France. This was the first Trophée des Champions held in Paris since 1969.

== Match ==
=== Details ===
3 January 2024
20:45 CET

Paris Saint-Germain	2–0	Toulouse
Lee 3'; Mbappé 44'	Report

Parc des Princes, Paris
Attendance: 43,792
Referee: Hakim Ben El Hadj

Paris Saint-Germain	Toulouse

GK	99	(Italy) Gianluigi Donnarumma
RB	2	(Morocco) Achraf Hakimi
CB	5	(Brazil) Marquinhos (c)
CB	37	(Slovakia) Milan Škriniar		(substituted off) 71'
LB	21	(France) Lucas Hernandez	(yellow card) 77'
CM	33	(France) Warren Zaïre-Emery
CM	17	(Portugal) Vitinha	(yellow card) 46'
CM	19	(South Korea) Lee Kang-in
RW	10	(France) Ousmane Dembélé		(substituted off) 69'
CF	7	(France) Kylian Mbappé
LW	29	(France) Bradley Barcola		(substituted off) 66'
Substitutes:
GK	1	(Costa Rica) Keylor Navas
DF	26	(France) Nordi Mukiele
DF	35	(Brazil) Lucas Beraldo		(substituted on) 71'
MF	4	(Uruguay) Manuel Ugarte
MF	11	(Spain) Marco Asensio		(substituted on) 69'
MF	15	(Portugal) Danilo Pereira
MF	28	(Spain) Carlos Soler
FW	9	(Portugal) Gonçalo Ramos
FW	23	(France) Randal Kolo Muani		(substituted on) 66'
Manager:
(Spain) Luis Enrique

GK	50	(France) Guillaume Restes
RB	13	(France) Christian Mawissa		(substituted off) 76'
CB	23	(Mali) Moussa Diarra
CB	2	(Denmark) Rasmus Nicolaisen
LB	17	(Chile) Gabriel Suazo	(yellow card) 45+1'
CM	24	(Venezuela) Cristian Cásseres Jr.
CM	4	(Netherlands) Stijn Spierings
RW	15	(Norway) Aron Dønnum		(substituted off) 65'
AM	8	(Switzerland) Vincent Sierro (c)		(substituted off) 76'
LW	11	(Spain) César Gelabert		(substituted off) 65'
CF	9	(Netherlands) Thijs Dallinga
Substitutes:
GK	30	(Spain) Álex Domínguez
DF	12	(Norway) Warren Kamanzi		(substituted on) 76'
DF	31	(Cameroon) Kévin Keben
MF	5	(Australia) Denis Genreau
MF	22	(Finland) Naatan Skyttä		(substituted on) 65'
MF	34	(France) Noah Lahmadi
FW	10	(Netherlands) Ibrahim Cissoko		(substituted on) 76'
FW	14	(Morocco) Yanis Begraoui
FW	19	(Cameroon) Frank Magri		(substituted on) 65'
Manager:
(Spain) Carles Martínez Novell

Man of the Match:
Lee Kang-in (Paris Saint-Germain)

Assistant referees:
Gwenaël Pasqualotti
Julien Aube
Fourth official:
Mathieu Vernice
Video assistant referee:
Benoît Millot
Assistant video assistant referee:
William Lavis

Match rules

- 90 minutes.
- Penalty shoot-out if scores level.
- Nine named substitutes, of which up to five may be used. (Note: Each team was given only three opportunities to make substitutions, excluding substitutions made at half-time.)

== See also ==
- 2023–24 Ligue 1
- 2023–24 Coupe de France
- 2023–24 Paris Saint-Germain FC season
- 2023–24 Toulouse FC season
