= 2024–25 Toulouse FC season =

Toulouse FC
2024–25 season
- President: Damien Comolli
- Manager: Carles Martínez Novell
- Stadium: Stadium de Toulouse
- Ligue 1: 10th
- Coupe de France: Quarter-finals
- Top goalscorer: League: Zakaria Aboukhlal (7); All: Zakaria Aboukhlal (7)
- Average home league attendance: 25,579
- Biggest win: Angers 0-4 Toulouse
- Biggest defeat: Paris 3–0 Toulouse
Home colours	Away colours

The 2024–25 season was the 55th season in the history of Toulouse FC, and was also the third consecutive season in Ligue 1. In addition to the domestic league, the team participated in the Coupe de France.

== Transfers ==
=== In ===
Pos.	Player	Transferred from	Fee	Date	Source
DF	(England) Charlie Cresswell	(England) Leeds United	€3,000,000	8 July 2024	
FW	(Norway) Joshua King	(Turkey) Fenerbahçe	Free	29 August 2024	
MF	(Slovenia) Miha Zajc	(Turkey) Fenerbahçe	Loan	31 August 2024	

=== Out ===
Pos.	Player	Transferred to	Fee	Date	Source
DF	(France) Moussa Diarra		End of contract	1 July 2024	
DF	(France) Anthony Rouault	(Germany) VfB Stuttgart	€3,000,000	1 July 2024	
MF	(Serbia) Veljko Birmančević	(Czech Republic) AC Sparta Prague	€2,300,000	1 July 2024	
DF	(Denmark) Mikkel Desler	(United States) Austin FC	End of contract	1 July 2024	
MF	(Netherlands) Ibrahim Cissoko	(England) Plymouth Argyle	Loan	9 July 2024	
MF	(Jamaica) Junior Flemmings	(United Arab Emirates) Ajman Club	Contract termination	19 July 2024	
FW	(Netherlands) Thijs Dallinga	(Italy) Bologna	€15,000,000	23 July 2024	
FW	(Bosnia and Herzegovina) Said Hamulić	(Poland) Widzew Łódź	Loan	24 July 2024	

Notes

1. ^{†} Loan transfer made permanent

== Friendlies ==
=== Pre-season ===
13 July 2024 Friendly	Toulouse	2–1	Rodez	Montauban
18:00	Gboho 32'; Magri 76'		Buades 10'	Stadium: Complexe Sportif Jean Verbeke

20 July 2024 Friendly	Toulouse	2–2	Pau	Blagnac
18:00	Zakaria Aboukhlal 17'; Ruiz 38' (o.g.)		Njoh 32'; Bobichon 76'	Stadium: Complexe sportif d'Andromède

27 July 2024 Friendly	Roma	0–1	Toulouse	Trigoria Alta, Italy
18:00			Gboho 35'	Stadium: Centro Sportivo Fulvio Bernardini

31 July 2024 Friendly	Girona	0–4	Toulouse	Navata, Spain
11:00				Stadium: Campo de Torremirona

4 August 2024 Friendly	Espanyol	0–0	Toulouse	Sant Adrià de Besòs, Spain
19:00				Stadium: Ciutat Esportiva Dani Jarque

== Competitions ==
=== Overall record ===
Competition	First match	Last match	Starting round	Final position	Record							
Competition	First match	Last match	Starting round	Final position	Pld	W	D	L	GF	GA	GD	Win %
Ligue 1	18 August 2024	17 May 2025	Matchday 1	10th	34	11	9	14	44	43	+1	32.35
Coupe de France	21 December 2024	5 February 2025	Round of 64	Quarter-finals	3	1	1	1	2	3	−1	33.33
Total					37	12	10	15	46	46	+0	32.43

Last updated: 17 May 2025
Source: Competitions

=== Ligue 1 ===
==== League table ====
Pos	Team	Pld	W	D	L	GF	GA	GD	Pts
8	Lens	34	15	7	12	42	39	+3	52
9	Brest	34	15	5	14	52	59	−7	50
10	Toulouse	34	11	9	14	44	43	+1	42
11	Auxerre	34	11	9	14	48	51	−3	42
12	Rennes	34	13	2	19	51	50	+1	41

Source: Ligue 1
Rules for classification: 1) Points; 2) Goal difference; 3) Head-to-head points; 4) Head-to-head goal difference; 5) Head-to-head goals scored; 6) Head-to-head away goals scored; 7) Goals scored; 8) Away goals scored; 9) Fair-play points (Note: Head-to-head record is used only after all the matches between the teams in question have been played).

==== Results by round ====
Round	1	2	3	4	5	6	7	8	9	10	11	12	13	14	15	16	17	18	19	20	21	22	23	24	25	26	27	28	29	30	31	32	33	34
Ground	H	A	H	H	A	H	A	H	A	H	A	A	H	A	H	A	H	A	H	H	A	H	A	A	H	A	H	A	H	A	A	H	H	A
Result	D	D	L	W	L	L	L	D	W	W	W	L	W	L	W	W	L	D	L	D	D	L	W	W	D	L	L	L	L	L	D	W	D	W
Position	10	11	15	11	13	15	16	15	14	12	10	10	10	10	9	8	8	8	10	10	10	10	10	8	10	10	11	11	12	12	12	12	12	10

Updated to match(es) played on 17 May 2025. Source: Ligue 1
A = Away; H = Home; W = Win; D = Draw; L = Loss

==== Matches ====
The league schedule was released on 21 June 2024.

18 August 2024 1	Toulouse	0–0	Nantes	Toulouse
17:00 CEST (UTC+2)	Kamanzi (yellow card) 24'	Report	Kadewere (yellow card) 45'; Castelletto (yellow card) 71'; Coco (yellow card) 71'	Stadium: Stadium de Toulouse; Attendance: 25,491; Referee: Jérémy Stinat

25 August 2024 2	Nice	1–1	Toulouse	Nice
17:00 CEST (UTC+2)	Bard (yellow card) 45+1'; Rosario (yellow card) 50'; Clauss 53'; Dante (yellow card) 56'; Mendy (yellow card) 82'	Report	McKenzie (yellow card) 54'; Dønnum (yellow card) 61'; Babicka 73'	Stadium: Allianz Riviera; Attendance: 21,656; Referee: Bastien Dechepy

31 August 2024 3	Toulouse	1–3	Marseille	Toulouse
21:00	Magri (red card) 27'; Cásseres (yellow card) 44'; Dønnum (yellow card) 49'; Babicka (yellow card) 73', (goal) 90'; Sierro (yellow card) 82'	Report	Højbjerg (yellow card) 10'; Greenwood 16', 17'; Cresswell 52' (o.g.); Brassier (yellow card) 73'	Stadium: Stadium de Toulouse; Attendance: 19,178; Referee: Stéphanie Frappart

15 September 2024 4	Toulouse	2–0	Le Havre	Toulouse
17:00	King (yellow card) 53'; Babicka 70'; Gboho 86'	Report	Sangante (yellow card) 57'	Stadium: Stadium de Toulouse; Attendance: 30,097; Referee: Éric Wattellier

22 September 2024 5	Brest	2–0	Toulouse	Brest
17:00 CEST (UTC+2)	Baldé 21'; Pereira Lage (yellow card) 34'; Faivre 90+1'	Report	Cásseres (yellow card) 19'; Aboukhlal (penalty missed) 35'	Stadium: Stade Francis-Le Blé; Attendance: 14,580; Referee: Florent Batta

29 September 2024 6	Toulouse	1–2	Lyon	Toulouse
15:00 CEST (UTC+2)	Gboho 14'; Dønnum (yellow card) 58'; Cásseres (yellow card) 87'	Report	Veretout (yellow card) 10'; Nicolaisen 28' (o.g.); Ćaleta-Car (yellow card) 48'; Fofana 90+5'	Stadium: Stadium de Toulouse; Attendance: 30,026; Referee: Gaël Angoula

5 October 2024 7	Lille	2–1	Toulouse	Villeneuve-d'Ascq
	And. Gomes (yellow card) 8'; Alexsandro (yellow card) 15'; Ang. Gomes 57'; Bakker 72'; Tiago Santos (yellow card) 90+7'	Report	Aboukhlal 39'; Sidibé (yellow card) 44'; Magri (yellow card) 90+3'	Stadium: Stade Pierre-Mauroy; Attendance: 36,947; Referee: Clément Turpin

20 October 2024 8	Toulouse	1–1	Angers	Toulouse
17:00 UTC+2	Aboukhlal (yellow card) 7'; Zajc (yellow card) 61'; King 64'	Report	Niane 5'; Arcus (yellow card) 25'; Aholou (yellow card) 38'; Fofana (yellow card) 74'; Abdelli (yellow card) 90'	Stadium: Stadium de Toulouse; Attendance: 24.107; Referee: Willy Delajod

27 October 2024 9	Montpellier	0–3	Toulouse	Montpellier
17:00 UTC+1	Savanier (red card) 51'	Report	Aboukhlal 5', 8'; King 27'	Stadium: Stade de la Mosson; Attendance: 14,111; Referee: Thomas Léonard

3 November 2024 10	Toulouse	1–0	Reims	Toulouse
15:00	Aboukhlal 84'	Report	Nakamura (yellow card) 77'; Sangui (yellow card) 81'; Agbadou (yellow card) 86'	Stadium: Stadium de Toulouse; Attendance: 23.769; Referee: Mathieu Vernice

10 November 2024 11	Rennes	0–2	Toulouse	Rennes
17:00 CET (UTC+1)	Gouiri (yellow card) 41'; Assignon (yellow card) 44'; Truffert (yellow card) 45+1'	Report	King 14'; Dønnum 23'; Cásseres (yellow card) 48'	Stadium: Roazhon Park; Attendance: 27,525; Referee: Romain Lissorgue

22 November 2024 12	Paris Saint-Germain	3–0	Toulouse	Paris
21:00 CET (UTC+1)	Neves 35'; Hakimi (yellow card) 44'; Beraldo 84'; Vitinha 90+1'	Report	Aboukhlal (yellow card) 43'; Dønnum (yellow card) 75'	Stadium: Parc des Princes; Attendance: 47,826; Referee: Gaël Angoula

1 December 2024 13	Toulouse	1–0	Auxerre	Toulouse
17:00 CET (UTC+1)	King 32'; Sierro 39' (pen.)	Report		Stadium: Stadium de Toulouse; Attendance: 23.746; Referee: Hakim Ben El Hadj

7 December 2024 14	Monaco	2–0	Toulouse	Monaco
17:00 CET (UTC+1)	Singo 50'; Embolo (yellow card) 69', (goal) 82'; Teze (yellow card) 90+1'	Report	Aboukhlal (yellow card) 37'; Cásseres (yellow card) 71'	Stadium: Stade Louis II; Attendance: 6,868; Referee: Stéphanie Frappart

13 December 2024 15	Toulouse	2–1	Saint-Étienne	Toulouse
20:45 CET (UTC+1)	Sierro (yellow card) 19'; King (yellow card) 49'; Babicka 55'; Cásseres Jr. (yellow card) 63'; Aboukhlal 85'	Report	Bouchouari (yellow card) 10'; Abdelhamid (yellow card) 49'; Stassin 53' (yellow card) 61'; Appiah (yellow card) 61'	Stadium: Stadium de Toulouse; Attendance: 25,336; Referee: Thomas Léonard

5 January 2025 16	RC Lens	0–1	Toulouse	Lens
15:00 CET (UTC+1)	Frankowski (yellow card) 8'; Danso (yellow card) 31'; Pereira da Costa (red card) 61'; Fulgini (yellow card) 64'; Koffi (yellow card) 77'; Ojediran (yellow card) 90+6'	Report	Cresswell (yellow card) 10'; Aboukhlal 73' (pen.); Gboho (yellow card) 77'	Stadium: Stade Bollaert-Delelis; Attendance: 37,461; Referee: Hakim Ben El Hadj

12 January 2025 17	Toulouse	1–2	RC Strasbourg	Toulouse
17:15 CET (UTC+1)	Akdağ (yellow card) 7'; Doukouré 35' (o.g.)	Report	Emegha 14' 26'; Sarr (yellow card) 42'; Santos (yellow card) 74'; Bakwa (yellow card) 77'; Sobol (yellow card) 90+2'	Stadium: Stadium de Toulouse; Attendance: 22,042; Referee: Benoît Bastien

18 January 2025 18	Olympique lyonnais	0–0	Toulouse	Décines-Charpieu
21:05 CET (UTC+1)	Kumbedi (yellow card) 56'	Report		Stadium: Groupama Stadium; Attendance: 42,592; Referee: Benoît Millot

26 January 2025 19	Toulouse	1–2	Montpellier HSC	Toulouse
17:15 CET (UTC+1)	Canvot (yellow card) 47'; Cásseres 59'	Report	Nzingoula (yellow card) 17'; Chotard (yellow card) 41'; Sagnan 62'; Maamma 83'	Stadium: Stadium de Toulouse; Attendance: 28,382; Referee: Clément Turpin

2 February 2025 20	Toulouse	1–1	Nice	Toulouse
15:00 CET (UTC+1)	Zajc (yellow card) 76'; McKenzie 85'; Aboukhlal (yellow card) 90+3'	Report	Laborde 18' (pen.); Boudaoui (yellow card) 63'; Ndayishimiye 90+3'	Stadium: Stadium de Toulouse; Attendance: 23,516; Referee: Thomas Léonard

9 February 2025 21	Auxerre	2–2	Toulouse	Auxerre
17:15 CET (UTC+1)	Jubal 62'; Traorè 73' (yellow card) 74'	Report	Cresswell 68'; Magri (yellow card) 88'; Edjouma 89'	Stadium: Stade de l'Abbé-Deschamps; Attendance: 15,801; Referee: Jérôme Brisard

15 February 2025 22	Toulouse	0–1	Paris Saint-Germain	Toulouse
21:05 CET (UTC+1)	Sierro (yellow card) 39'; Akdağ 56'	Report	Ruiz 52'	Stadium: Stadium de Toulouse; Attendance: 31,703; Referee: Willy Delajod

23 February 2025 23	Le Havre	1–4	Toulouse	Le Havre
17:15 CET (UTC+1)	Soumaré 51'; Mwanga (red card) 59'	Report	Aboukhlal 9'; Sierro 56' (pen.) (yellow card) 73'; Dønnum 63'; Magri 78'; Kamanzi (yellow card) 90+5'	Stadium: Stade Océane; Attendance: 17,200; Referee: François Letexier

2 March 2025 24	Angers SCO	0–4	Toulouse	Angers
17:15 CET (UTC+1)	Aholou (yellow card) 45+2'; Fofane (yellow card) 58'; Capelle (yellow card) 90+6'	Report	Magri 51' (yellow card) 45'; Sierro 57'; Creswell 71'; Dønnum 63'; Kamanzi (yellow card) 84'; Edjouma 90+4'; Gboho (yellow card) 90+6'	Stadium: Stade Raymond Kopa; Attendance: 12,758; Referee: Jérémy Stinat

7 March 2025 25	Toulouse	1–1	Monaco	Toulouse
21:05 CET (UTC+1)	Cresswell (yellow card) 45+1'; Magri 90+1'	Report	Mawissa (yellow card) 1'; Minamino 17'; Embolo (yellow card) 74'; Akliouche (yellow card) 90'	Stadium: Stadium de Toulouse; Attendance: 25,614; Referee: Marc Bollengier

16 March 2024 26	Strasbourg	2–1	Toulouse	Strasbourg
18:15 CET (UTC+1)	Lemaréchal 47'; Santos 54'	Report	Magri 3', (yellow card) 24'; Cásseres Jr. (yellow card) 28'	Stadium: Stade de la Meinau; Attendance: 19,128; Referee: Florent Batta

30 March 2025 27	Toulouse	2–4	Brest	Toulouse
15:00 CET (UTC+1)	Sierro 65'; King 78'	Report	Bourgault 22'; Lala (yellow card) 24'; Pereira Lage 26', (yellow card) 68'; Lala (yellow card) 28'; Lees-Melou 62'; Bizot (yellow card) 86'; Zogbé (yellow card) 86'; Camara 90'	Stadium: Stadium de Toulouse; Attendance: 24,418; Referee: Hakim Ben El Hadj

6 April 2025 28	Marseille	3–2	Toulouse	Marseille
20:45 CEST (UTC+2)	Suazo 21' (o.g.); Greenwood (yellow card) 24', (goal) 57'; Rabiot 64'; Nadir (yellow card) 90+5'	Report	Magri 28', (yellow card) 56'; Babicka (yellow card) 32'; Cásseres Jr. (yellow card) 68'; Sierro 76'	Stadium: Stade Vélodrome; Referee: Jérémie Pignard

12 April 2025 29	Toulouse	1–2	Lille	Toulouse
19:00 CEST (UTC+2)	Cresswell 42', (yellow card) 64'	Report	Fernandez-Pardo 21'; Bakker 45+4'; Alexsandro (yellow card) 71'; E. Mbappé (yellow card) 85'	Stadium: Stadium de Toulouse; Attendance: 25,936; Referee: Jérôme Brisard

20 April 2024 30	Reims	1–0	Toulouse	Reims
17:15	Pefok 39'; Moscardo (yellow card) 74'	Report	Mckenzie (red card) 27'	Stadium: Stade Auguste-Delaune; Attendance: 14,908; Referee: Marc Bollengier

27 April 2025 31	Nantes	0–0	Toulouse	Nantes
17:15 CEST (UTC+2)	Augusto (yellow card) 26'; Cozza (yellow card) 80'	Report	Canvot (yellow card) 9'; Edjouma (red card) 38'; Dønnum (yellow card) 80'; Cresswell (yellow card) 90+2'	Stadium: Stade de la Beaujoire; Attendance: 31,618; Referee: Florent Batta

3 May 2025 32	Toulouse	2–1	Rennes	Toulouse
19:00 CEST (UTC+2)	Cresswell (yellow card) 15'; Gboho 28'; Magri (yellow card) 65'; Dønnum 82'; Restes (yellow card) 90+6'	Report	Rouault (yellow card) 45+2'; Wooh (yellow card) 47'; Kalimuendo 65'	Stadium: Stadium de Toulouse; Attendance: 23,922; Referee: Benoît Millot

10 May 2025 33	Toulouse	1–1	Lens	Toulouse
21:00 CEST (UTC+2)	Gboho 47'; Dønnum (yellow card) 63'; Cásseres Jr. (yellow card) 87'	Report	Thomasson (yellow card) 51'; Medina (yellow card) 57'; Mendy (yellow card) 60'; El Aynaoui 61'; Saïd (yellow card) 87'; Zaroury (yellow card) 88'	Stadium: Stadium de Toulouse; Attendance: 27,890; Referee: Bastien Dechepy

17 May 2025 34	Saint-Étienne	2–3	Toulouse	Saint-Étienne
21:00 CEST (UTC+2)	Wadji (yellow card) 30'; Tardieu 38'; Batubinsika 63'; Davitashvili (yellow card) 70'; Bouchouari (yellow card) 82'	Report	Kamanzi 10'; King 15'; Gboho 58'; Cásseres Jr. (yellow card) 70'; Restes (yellow card) 90'	Stadium: Stade Geoffroy-Guichard; Attendance: 38,725; Referee: Thomas Léonard; Man of the Match: Zuriko Davitashvili

=== Coupe de France ===
21 December 2024 Round of 64	Hauts Lyonnais	0–0 (2–4 p)	Toulouse	Feurs
15:30	Valey (yellow card) 30'; Loirette (red card) 67'; Poncet (yellow card) 71'; Cabaton (yellow card) 90+5'	Report	Schmidt (red card) 27'; Dønnum (yellow card) 65'; Suazo (yellow card) 82'; Cresswell (yellow card) 90+5'	Stadium: Stade Maurice-Rousson; Referee: Mikael Lesage
	Penalties
	Dallois (penalty scored); Bouguerra (penalty missed); Jeanpierre (penalty missed); Cabaton (penalty scored)		(penalty missed) Magri; (penalty scored) Suazo; (penalty scored) Zajc; (penalty scored) Gboho; (penalty scored) Dønnum

15 January 2025 Round of 16	Toulouse	2–1	Laval	Toulouse
18:30	Genreau 19'; Cresswell 24' (yellow card) 70'; McKenzie (yellow card) 90+2'	Report	Cherni (yellow card) 27'; Tell (yellow card) 67'; Kokolo (yellow card) 77'; Adilèhou 85'	Stadium: Stadium de Toulouse; Attendance: 17,291; Referee: Mathieu Vernice

5 February 2025 Quarter-finals	Toulouse	0–2	Guingamp	Toulouse
20:45	Babicka (yellow card) 38'; Messali (yellow card) 48'	Report	Ourega (yellow card) 45'; Sidibé 52' (yellow card) 63'; Le bris (yellow card) 72'; Gomis (yellow card) 74'; Ahile 89'	Stadium: Stadium de Toulouse; Referee: Marc Bollengier
