= 2023–24 Toulouse FC season =

Toulouse FC
2023–24 season
- President: Damien Comolli
- Head coach: Carles Martínez Novell
- Stadium: Stadium de Toulouse
- Ligue 1: 11th
- Coupe de France: Round of 32
- Trophée des Champions: Runners-up
- UEFA Europa League: Knockout round play-offs
- Top goalscorer: League: Thijs Dallinga (14); All: Thijs Dallinga (19)
- Average home league attendance: 25,802
Home colours	Away colours	Third colours

The 2023–24 season was Toulouse Football Club's 54th season in existence and second consecutive season in Ligue 1. They also competed in the Coupe de France, the Trophée des Champions and the UEFA Europa League.

== Players ==
=== First-team squad ===
As of 25 January 2024

Note: Flags indicate national team as defined under FIFA eligibility rules; some limited exceptions apply. Players may hold more than one non-FIFA nationality.

No.	Pos.	Nation	Player
1	GK	FRA	Thomas Himeur
2	DF	DEN	Rasmus Nicolaisen
3	DF	DEN	Mikkel Desler
4	MF	NED	Stijn Spierings (on loan from Lens)
5	MF	AUS	Denis Genreau
6	DF	CPV	Logan Costa
7	FW	MAR	Zakaria Aboukhlal
8	MF	SUI	Vincent Sierro (captain)
9	FW	NED	Thijs Dallinga
10	FW	NED	Ibrahim Cissoko
11	MF	ESP	César Gelabert
12	DF	NOR	Warren Kamanzi
13	DF	FRA	Christian Mawissa
15	MF	NOR	Aron Dønnum
17	DF	CHI	Gabriel Suazo

No.	Pos.	Nation	Player
19	FW	CMR	Frank Magri
20	MF	GER	Niklas Schmidt
22	MF	FIN	Naatan Skyttä
23	DF	MLI	Moussa Diarra
24	MF	VEN	Cristian Cásseres Jr.
25	DF	CMR	Kévin Keben
26	DF	FRA	Ylies Aradj
30	GK	ESP	Álex Domínguez
33	FW	FRA	Bonota Traoré
34	MF	FRA	Noah Lahmadi
35	FW	FRA	Noah Edjouma
37	MF	FRA	Yann Gboho
40	GK	FRA	Justin Lacombe
50	GK	FRA	Guillaume Restes
80	FW	GAB	Shavy Babicka

=== Out on loan ===
Note: Flags indicate national team as defined under FIFA eligibility rules; some limited exceptions apply. Players may hold more than one non-FIFA nationality.

No.	Pos.	Nation	Player
14	FW	MAR	Yanis Begraoui (at Pau until 30 June 2024)
18	DF	SWE	Oliver Zandén (at Randers until 31 December 2024)
21	MF	BFA	Mamady Bangré (at Troyes until 30 June 2024)
77	FW	JAM	Junior Flemmings (at Voždovac until 30 June 2024)

No.	Pos.	Nation	Player
—	MF	FRA	Kléri Serber (at Botev Vratsa until 30 June 2024)
—	FW	BIH	Said Hamulić (at Lokomotiv Moscow until 30 June 2024)
—	GK	NOR	Kjetil Haug (at Bodø/Glimt until 30 June 2024)

== Transfers ==
=== In ===
Pos.	Player	Transferred from	Fee	Date	Source
MF	(Spain) César Gelabert	(Spain) Mirandés	Free	1 July 2023	
MF	(Netherlands) Ibrahim Cissoko	(Netherlands) NEC Nijmegen	€3,000,000	1 July 2023	
MF	(Venezuela) Cristian Cásseres Jr.	(United States) New York Red Bulls	€1,000,000	7 July 2023	
DF	(Germany) Niklas Schmidt	(Germany) Werder Bremen	€2,500,000	4 August 2023	
MF	(Norway) Aron Dønnum	(Belgium) Standard Liège	€4,500,000	1 September 2023	
MF	(Netherlands) Stijn Spierings	(France) Lens	Loan	14 September 2023	
FW	(France) Yann Gboho	(Belgium) Cercle Brugge	€2,500,000	8 January 2024	
FW	(Gabon) Shavy Babicka	(Cyprus) Aris Limassol FC	€2,800,000	18 January 2024	
FW	(Bosnia and Herzegovina) Said Hamulić	(Netherlands) SBV Vitesse	Loan return	30 January 2024	

=== Out ===
Pos.	Player	Transferred to	Fee	Date	Source
DF	(France) Tom Rapnouil	(Bulgaria) CSKA 1948	Free	1 July 2023	
MF	(France) Sam Sanna	(France) Laval	Free	1 July 2023	
FW	(England) Rhys Healey	(England) Watford	Free	1 July 2023	
MF	(Netherlands) Branco van den Boomen	(Netherlands) Ajax	Free	1 July 2023	
MF	(Netherlands) Stijn Spierings	(France) Lens	Free	1 July 2023	
MF	(Serbia) Veljko Birmančević	(Czech Republic) Sparta Prague	Loan	1 July 2023	
FW	(Japan) Ado Onaiwu	(France) Auxerre	€800,000	23 August 2023	
MF	(Jamaica) Junior Flemmings	(Serbia) FK Voždovac	Loan	14 September 2023	
MF	(Burkina Faso) Mamady Bangré	(France) Troyes	Loan	8 January 2024	
FW	(Morocco) Yanis Begraoui	(France) Pau	Loan	11 January 2024	
FW	(Bosnia and Herzegovina) Said Hamulić	(Russia) Lokomotiv Moscow	Loan	31 January 2024	
GK	(Norway) Kjetil Haug	(Norway) Bodø/Glimt	Loan	6 February 2024	

Notes
1.Option to buy.

== Pre-season and friendlies ==
15 July 2023 Friendly	Montpellier	3–1	Toulouse	Béziers
19:00 CEST (UTC+2)	Issoufou 45+2'; Khazri 63'; Delaye 83'	Report	Onaiwu 17'	Stadium: Stade Raoul-Barrière

19 July 2023 Friendly	Toulouse	0–0	FC Andorra	Toulouse
19:00 CEST (UTC+2)		Report		Stadium: Annexe 1 of Stadium

22 July 2023 Friendly	Werder Bremen	5–2	Toulouse	Zell am Ziller, Austria
15:30 CEST (UTC+2)	Schmid 36'; Füllkrug 50' 73'; Kownacki 62' 82'	Report	Bangré 15'; Onaiwu 57'	Stadium: Parkstadion de Zell

25 July 2023 Friendly	Toulouse	0–2	Norwich City	Kufstein, Austria
19:00 CEST (UTC+2)		Report	Fassnacht 95'; Sara 104'	Stadium: Grenzlandstadion Arena

29 July 2023 Friendly	Toulouse	2–1	Osasuna	Tarbes
12:00 CEST (UTC+2)	Dallinga 34' (pen.); Chaïbi 88'	Report	Ibáñez 3'	Stadium: Stade Maurice Trélut

6 August 2023 Friendly	Toulouse	2–1	Roma	Toulouse
19:30 CEST (UTC+2)	Dallinga 5'; Begraoui 90'	Report	Dybala 26'	Stadium: Stadium de Toulouse; Attendance: 29,024

== Competitions ==
=== Overall record ===
Competition	First match	Last match	Starting round	Final position	Record							
Competition	First match	Last match	Starting round	Final position	Pld	W	D	L	GF	GA	GD	Win %
Ligue 1	13 August 2023	19 May 2024	Matchday 1	11th	34	11	10	13	42	46	−4	32.35
Coupe de France	7 January 2024	21 January 2024	Round of 64	Round of 32	2	1	1	0	6	3	+3	50.00
Trophée des Champions	3 January 2024		Final	Runners-up	1	0	0	1	0	2	−2	0.00
UEFA Europa League	21 September 2023	22 February 2024	Group stage	Knockout round play-offs	8	3	3	2	9	11	−2	37.50
Total					45	15	14	16	57	62	−5	33.33

Source: Soccerway

=== Ligue 1 ===
==== League table ====
Pos	Team	Pld	W	D	L	GF	GA	GD	Pts
9	Reims	34	13	8	13	42	47	−5	47
10	Rennes	34	12	10	12	53	46	+7	46
11	Toulouse	34	11	10	13	42	46	−4	43
12	Montpellier (Note: Montpellier was deducted one point for uncontrolled crowd trouble that caused the abandonment of its match against Clermont.)	34	10	12	12	43	48	−5	41
13	Strasbourg	34	10	9	15	38	50	−12	39

Source: Ligue 1
Rules for classification: 1) Points; 2) Goal difference; 3) Head-to-head points; 4) Head-to-head goal difference; 5) Head-to-head goals scored; 6) Head-to-head away goals scored; 7) Goals scored; 8) Away goals scored; 9) Fair-play points (Note: Head-to-head record is used only after all the matches between the teams in question have been played).

==== Results summary ====
Overall								Home						Away					
Pld	W	D	L	GF	GA	GD	Pts	W	D	L	GF	GA	GD	W	D	L	GF	GA	GD
34	11	10	13	42	46	−4	43	3	7	7	21	25	−4	8	3	6	21	21	0

Source: Ligue 1

==== Results by round ====
Round	1	2	3	4	5	6	7	8	9	10	11	12	13	14	15	16	17	18	19	20	21	22	23	24	25	26	27	28	29	30	31	32	33	34
Ground	A	H	A	H	A	A	H	A	H	A	H	A	A	H	A	H	H	A	H	A	H	A	H	H	A	H	A	H	A	H	A	H	A	H
Result	W	D	L	D	D	L	W	D	D	L	L	D	L	D	L	D	L	W	L	W	L	W	W	W	L	L	W	D	W	D	W	L	W	L
Position	4	7	11	12	13	15	12	10	10	12	14	14	15	14	15	15	16	14	14	12	14	13	11	10	11	11	11	11	11	11	10	11	10	11

Source: Ligue 1
A = Away; H = Home; W = Win; D = Draw; L = Loss

==== Matches ====
The league fixtures were unveiled on 29 June 2023.

13 August 2023 1	Nantes	1–2	Toulouse	Nantes
15:00 CEST (UTC+2)	Coco (yellow card) 2'; Mohamed 13' (pen.); Pallois (yellow card) 18'	Report	Costa (yellow card) 53'; Aboukhlal 62'; Sierro (yellow card) 73'; Nicolaisen 90+1'	Stadium: Stade de la Beaujoire; Attendance: 30,578; Referee: Willy Delajod

19 August 2023 2	Toulouse	1–1	Paris Saint-Germain	Toulouse
21:00 CEST (UTC+2)	Aboukhlal 87' (pen.)	Report	Lee (yellow card) 45+1'; Mbappé 62' (pen.); Ugarte (yellow card) 81'; Donnarumma (yellow card) 85'	Stadium: Stadium de Toulouse; Attendance: 27,332; Referee: Thomas Léonard

27 August 2023 3	Strasbourg	2–0	Toulouse	Strasbourg
15:00 CEST (UTC+2)	Deminguet (yellow card) 43'; Emegha 52'; Bellegarde 89'	Report	Suazo (yellow card) 54'; Dallinga (yellow card) 68'; Chaïbi (yellow card) 81'	Stadium: Stade de la Meinau; Attendance: 25,090; Referee: Benoît Bastien

3 September 2023 4	Toulouse	2–2	Clermont	Toulouse
13:00 CEST (UTC+2)	Aboukhlal 8'; Magri 15'; Dallinga (yellow card) 90+2'	Report	Kyei 34' (pen.); Boutobba (yellow card) 37'; Seidu (yellow card) 73'; Diaw (yellow card) 90+2'; Ogier 90+6'	Stadium: Stadium de Toulouse; Attendance: 28,285; Referee: Florent Batta

17 September 2023 5	Marseille	0–0	Toulouse	Marseille
17:05 CEST (UTC+2)	Correa (yellow card) 64'; Harit (yellow card) 89'	Report	Schmidt (yellow card) 4'; Desler (yellow card) 45'; Magri (yellow card) 77'; Restes (yellow card) 79'; Bangré (yellow card) 90+5'	Stadium: Stade Vélodrome; Attendance: 63,477; Referee: François Letexier

24 September 2023 6	Lens	2–1	Toulouse	Lens
15:00 CEST (UTC+2)	Saïd 45+2'; Gradit (yellow card) 54'; Wahi (yellow card) 75'; Guilavogui 84'	Report	Gelabert 33'; Dønnum (yellow card) 69'	Stadium: Stade Bollaert-Delelis; Attendance: 37,506; Referee: Hakim Ben El Hadj

1 October 2023 7	Toulouse	3–0	Metz	Toulouse
15:00 CEST (UTC+2)	Nicolaisen (yellow card) 13'; Schmidt 31'; Dallinga 43'; Suazo (yellow card) 63'; Sierro (yellow card) 75'; Magri 82'	Report		Stadium: Stadium de Toulouse; Attendance: 24,770; Referee: Gaël Angoula

8 October 2023 8	Brest	1–1	Toulouse	Brest
15:00 CEST (UTC+2)	Camara (yellow card) 45+5'; Brassier (yellow card) 70'; Satriano 90+3'	Report	Spierings (yellow card) 10'; Magri 27', (yellow card) 79'	Stadium: Stade Francis-Le Blé; Attendance: 14,509; Referee: Pierre Gaillouste

22 October 2023 9	Toulouse	1–1	Reims	Toulouse
15:00 CEST (UTC+2)	Dallinga 53'; Costa (yellow card) 59'; Dønnum (yellow card) 62'	Report	Richardson 48'	Stadium: Stadium de Toulouse; Attendance: 23,795; Referee: Jérémy Stinat

29 October 2023 10	Montpellier	3–0	Toulouse	Montpellier
15:00 CET (UTC+1)	Adams 13', 72'; Fayad (yellow card) 30', (goal) 63'; Kouyaté (yellow card) 45+2'	Report	Suazo (yellow card) 33'; Magri (yellow card) 38'; Schmidt (yellow card) 65'	Stadium: Stade de la Mosson; Attendance: 13,209; Referee: Thomas Léonard

5 November 2023 11	Toulouse	1–2	Le Havre	Toulouse
15:00 CET (UTC+1)	Costa (yellow card) 30'; Dallinga (penalty missed) 45+3', 50'; Schmidt (yellow card) 45+4'	Report	Casimir (yellow card) 45+2'; Bayo 83', 90+5'; Ndiaye (yellow card) 85'	Stadium: Stadium de Toulouse; Attendance: 23,060; Referee: Marc Bollengier

12 November 2023 12	Lille	1–1	Toulouse	Villeneuve-d'Ascq
15:00 CET (UTC+1)	Yoro 30'; Bentaleb (yellow card) 38'; David (yellow card) 47'; Alexsandro (yellow card) 64'	Report	Spierings (yellow card) 61'; Dallinga 65', (yellow card) 82'; Nicolaisen (yellow card) 90+2'; Cissoko (yellow card) 90+6'	Stadium: Stade Pierre-Mauroy; Attendance: 34,959; Referee: Mathieu Vernice

26 November 2023 13	Nice	1–0	Toulouse	Nice
13:00 CET (UTC+1)	Moffi 54'	Report	Cásseres (yellow card) 33'; Bangré (yellow card) 81'; Desler (yellow card) 83'; Gelabert (yellow card) 90+3'	Stadium: Allianz Riviera; Attendance: 21,849; Referee: François Letexier

3 December 2023 14	Toulouse	1–1	Lorient	Toulouse
15:00 CET (UTC+1)	Dønnum (yellow card) 1'; Dallinga 72'; Sierro (yellow card) 83'	Report	Bakayoko (yellow card) 9'; Talbi (yellow card) 33'; Ponceau (yellow card) 71'; B. Mendy (yellow card) 83'; Dieng 90+1'	Stadium: Stadium de Toulouse; Attendance: 22,799; Referee: Thomas Léonard

10 December 2023 15	Lyon	3–0	Toulouse	Décines-Charpieu
17:05 CET (UTC+1)	Lacazette 25', 29', 80'; Diawara (yellow card) 68'; Moreira (yellow card) 87'	Report	Sierro (yellow card) 41'; Dallinga (penalty missed) 45+2'; Dønnum (yellow card) 63'; Diarra (yellow card) 79'	Stadium: Groupama Stadium; Attendance: 36,777; Referee: Pierre Gaillouste

17 December 2023 16	Toulouse	0–0	Rennes	Toulouse
15:00 CET (UTC+1)	Dallinga (yellow card) 45'; Costa (yellow card) 51'; Diarra (yellow card) 90+2'	Report	Le Fée (yellow card) 7'; Omari (yellow card) 10'	Stadium: Stadium de Toulouse; Attendance: 23,311; Referee: Jérémy Stinat

20 December 2023 17	Toulouse	1–2	Monaco	Toulouse
21:00 CET (UTC+1)	Magri 5'; Costa (yellow card) 45+3'; Dønnum (yellow card) 52'	Report	Salisu (yellow card) 3'; Ben Yedder 26', 44' (pen.); Golovin (red card) 51'; Diop (yellow card) 57'; Magassa (yellow card) 66'	Stadium: Stadium de Toulouse; Attendance: 23,881; Referee: Jérôme Brisard

14 January 2024 18	Metz	0–1	Toulouse	Metz
15:00 CET (UTC+1)	Jean Jacques (yellow card) 18'; Sabaly (yellow card) 20'; N'Doram (yellow card) 37'; Hérelle (red card) 72'	Report	Sierro 12' (pen.); Dallinga (yellow card) 40'; Kamanzi (yellow card) 81'	Stadium: Stade Saint-Symphorien; Attendance: 21,065; Referee: Florent Batta

28 January 2024 19	Toulouse	0–2	Lens	Toulouse
17:50 CET (UTC+1)	Dønnum (yellow card) 40'; Nicolaisen (yellow card) 45'; Suazo (yellow card) 49'; Sierro (penalty missed) 84'	Report	Saïd (yellow card) 36'; Costa 42'; Diouf 56'; Haïdara (yellow card) 83'; Sotoca (yellow card) 90'	Stadium: Stadium de Toulouse; Attendance: 27,310; Referee: Mathieu Vernice

4 February 2024 20	Reims	2–3	Toulouse	Reims
15:00 CET (UTC+1)	Stambouli (yellow card) 21'; De Smet (yellow card) 24'; Teuma 49'; Akieme 90+1'	Report	Mawissa 12'; Schmidt (yellow card) 18'; Babicka 31'; Dallinga 45+2' (pen.); Nicolaisen (yellow card) 55'; Suazo (yellow card) 87'	Stadium: Stade Auguste-Delaune; Attendance: 12,817; Referee: Pierre Gaillouste

11 February 2024 21	Toulouse	1–2	Nantes	Toulouse
15:00 CET (UTC+1)	Sierro (yellow card) 19'; Gboho (yellow card) 41'; Dallinga 90+6'	Report	Mohamed 2'; Sissoko (yellow card) 45+1'; Kadewere 51'	Stadium: Stadium de Toulouse; Attendance: 28,933; Referee: Gaël Angoula

18 February 2024 22	Monaco	1–2	Toulouse	Monaco
15:00 CET (UTC+1)	Zakaria (yellow card) 27'; Akliouche 48'	Report	Sierro 41'; Mawissa (yellow card) 65'; Costa 70'; Dønnum (yellow card) 82'; Restes (yellow card) 90+3'	Stadium: Stade Louis II; Attendance: 4,702; Referee: Benoît Bastien

25 February 2024 23	Toulouse	3–1	Lille	Toulouse
15:00 CET (UTC+1)	Magri (yellow card) 34'; Mawissa 49'; Sierro 60' (pen.), (yellow card) 70'; Dallinga 66'	Report	Haraldsson 45'	Stadium: Stadium de Toulouse; Attendance: 24,110; Referee: Mathieu Vernice

3 March 2024 24	Toulouse	2–1	Nice	Toulouse
13:00 CET (UTC+1)	Costa (yellow card) 45+2'; Dallinga 66'; Gboho 69'; Spierings (yellow card) 90+2'	Report	Thuram (yellow card) 2'; Moffi 8', (yellow card) 50'	Stadium: Stadium de Toulouse; Attendance: 25,507; Referee: Jérémie Pignard

10 March 2024 25	Le Havre	1–0	Toulouse	Le Havre
15:00 CET (UTC+1)	Opéri 60', (yellow card) 84'; Ngoura (yellow card) 90+5'	Report	Keben (yellow card) 90+5'	Stadium: Stade Océane; Attendance: 21,462; Referee: Romain Lissorgue

15 March 2024 26	Toulouse	2–3	Lyon	Toulouse
21:00 CET (UTC+1)	Spierings (yellow card) 43'; Dønnum (yellow card) 45+2'; Dallinga 53'; Sierro 59' (pen.)	Report	Lacazette 33'; Tolisso (yellow card) 37'; Mata (yellow card) 45+1'; Cherki 77'; O'Brien 81'	Stadium: Stadium de Toulouse; Attendance: 28,436; Referee: Jérémy Stinat

31 March 2024 27	Clermont	0–3	Toulouse	Clermont-Ferrand
15:00 CEST (UTC+2)	Caufriez (yellow card) 6'; Armougom (yellow card) 45+5'; M'Bahia (yellow card) 78'	Report	Sierro 8' (pen.), 79', (yellow card) 18'; Dallinga 73'	Stadium: Stade Gabriel-Montpied; Attendance: 10,499; Referee: Pierre Gaillouste

7 April 2024 28	Toulouse	0–0	Strasbourg	Toulouse
15:00 CET (UTC+1)	Dallinga (yellow card) 15'; Aboukhlal (yellow card) 86'	Report		Stadium: Stadium de Toulouse; Attendance: 23,672; Referee: Ruddy Buquet

13 April 2024 29	Rennes	1–2	Toulouse	Rennes
21:00 CEST (UTC+2)	D. Doué 20'; Gouiri (yellow card) 60'; Yıldırım (yellow card) 88'; Salah (yellow card) 90+1'	Report	Cásseres 22'; Diarra 32'; Mawissa (yellow card) 34'; Spierings (yellow card) 81'; Restes (yellow card) 88'	Stadium: Roazhon Park; Attendance: 28,055; Referee: Florent Batta

21 April 2024 30	Toulouse	2–2	Marseille	Nantes
19:00 CEST (UTC+2)	Diarra (yellow card) 40'; Nicolaisen 45+2'; Gboho 82'	Report	Murillo (yellow card) 33'; Onana 38'; Ounahi (yellow card) 47'; Moumbagna 90+6'	Stadium: Stade de la Beaujoire; Attendance: 29,809; Referee: Clément Turpin

28 April 2024 31	Lorient	1–2	Toulouse	Lorient
15:00 CEST (UTC+2)	Ponceau 20'; Adjei (yellow card) 31'	Report	Diarra (yellow card) 38'; Aboukhlal (yellow card) 51'; Dallinga 59'; Cissoko 83'; Sierro (yellow card) 87'	Stadium: Stade du Moustoir; Attendance: 16,125; Referee: Gaël Angoula

3 May 2024 32	Toulouse	1–2	Montpellier	Toulouse
19:00 CEST (UTC+2)	Dallinga 34'; Nicolaisen (yellow card) 54' (yellow-red card) 83'; Diarra (yellow card) 60'	Report	Savanier (yellow card) 26', (goal) 27', (red card) 65'; Leroy (yellow card) 44'; Fayad 81'; Karamoh (yellow card) 90+4'	Stadium: Stadium de Toulouse; Attendance: 24,740; Referee: Marc Bollengier

12 May 2024 33	Paris Saint-Germain	1–3	Toulouse	Paris
21:00 CEST (UTC+2)	K. Mbappé 8'	Report	Dallinga 13'; Gboho 68'; Magri 90+5'	Stadium: Parc des Princes; Attendance: 47,855; Referee: Florent Batta

19 May 2024 34	Toulouse	0–3	Brest	Toulouse
21:00 CEST (UTC+2)	Mawissa (yellow card) 53'	Report	Camara 48'; Amavi 54', (yellow card) 83'; Pereira Lage (yellow card) 79'; Lala 90'	Stadium: Stadium de Toulouse; Attendance: 28,885; Referee: Jérémie Pignard

=== Coupe de France ===
7 January 2024 Round of 64	Chambéry	0–3	Toulouse	Chambéry
17:30 CET (UTC+1)	Braillon (yellow card) 90+4'	Report	Skyttä 7', 35'; Cásseres (yellow card) 39'; Dønnum (yellow card) 83'; Dallinga 84'	Stadium: Chambéry Savoie Stadium; Attendance: 4,619; Referee: Gaël Angoula

21 January 2024 Round of 32	Rouen	3–3 (12–11 p)	Toulouse	Le Petit-Quevilly
17:30 CET (UTC+1)	Bezzekhami 16'; Benkaid (penalty missed) 41'; Sanson 43' (pen.); Bouzamoucha 64'; Aggoune (yellow card) 88'	Report	Sierro 19' (pen.); Gboho 32'; Cissoko (yellow card) 43'; Spierings (yellow card) 64'; Nicolaisen 90+2'	Stadium: Stade Robert Diochon; Attendance: 5,100; Referee: Bastien Dechepy
	Penalties
	Sahloune (penalty scored); Bassin (penalty scored); Benzia (penalty scored); Z. Allée (penalty scored); Ouadah (penalty scored); Sanson (penalty scored); Bernasque (penalty scored); Bouzamoucha (penalty scored); Bezzekhami (penalty scored); Aggoune (penalty scored); Kabongo (penalty scored); Sahloune (penalty scored)		(penalty scored) Suazo; (penalty scored) Sierro; (penalty scored) Schmidt; (penalty scored) Dallinga; (penalty scored) Gelabert; (penalty scored) Skyttä; (penalty scored) Nicolaisen; (penalty scored) Edjouma; (penalty scored) Babicka; (penalty scored) Mawissa; (penalty scored) Domínguez; (penalty missed) Suazo

=== Trophée des Champions ===
3 January 2024 Final	Paris Saint-Germain	2–0	Toulouse	Paris
20:45 CET (UTC+1)	Lee 3'; Mbappé 44'; Vitinha (yellow card) 46'; Hernandez (yellow card) 77'	Report	Suazo (yellow card) 45+1'	Stadium: Parc des Princes; Attendance: 43,792; Referee: Hakim Ben El Hadj

=== UEFA Europa League ===
==== Group stage ====
The draw for the group stage was held on 1 September 2023.

Pos	Team	Pld	W	D	L	GF	GA	GD	Pts	Qualification	LIV	TOU	USG	LAS
1	(England) Liverpool	6	4	0	2	17	7	+10	12	Advance to round of 16	—	5–1	2–0	4–0
2	(France) Toulouse	6	3	2	1	8	9	−1	11	Advance to knockout round play-offs	3–2	—	0–0	1–0
3	(Belgium) Union Saint-Gilloise	6	2	2	2	5	8	−3	8	Transfer to Europa Conference League	2–1	1–1	—	2–1
4	(Austria) LASK	6	1	0	5	6	12	−6	3		1–3	1–2	3–0	—

Source: UEFA
Rules for classification: Group stage tiebreakers

21 September 2023 1	Union Saint-Gilloise (Belgium)	1–1	(France) Toulouse	Brussels, Belgium
18:55 CEST (UTC+2)	Vanhoutte (yellow card) 14'; Mac Allister (yellow card) 53'; Amoura 69'; Sadiki (yellow card) 78'	Report	Dønnum (yellow card) 33'; Dallinga 45+3' (pen.); Costa (yellow card) 66' (yellow-red card) 90+4'; Magri (yellow card) 86'	Stadium: Constant Vanden Stock Stadium; Attendance: 12,162; Referee: Rohit Saggi (Norway)
Note: The match was played at the Constant Vanden Stock Stadium in Brussels, instead of Union Saint-Gilloise's regular stadium, the Joseph Marien Stadium, which did not meet UEFA requirements. The match was postponed by ten minutes due to traffic encountered by both teams before getting to the stadium.

5 October 2023 2	Toulouse (France)	1–0	(Austria) LASK	Toulouse
21:00 CEST (UTC+2)	Suazo 31', (yellow card) 36'; Diarra (yellow card) 39'; Schmidt (yellow card) 40'; Desler (yellow card) 65'; Cásseres (yellow card) 79'	Report	Jovičić (yellow card) 57'; Darboe (yellow card) 76'; Ljubic (yellow card) 90'	Stadium: Stadium de Toulouse; Attendance: 29,233; Referee: Nick Walsh (Scotland)

26 October 2023 3	Liverpool (England)	5–1	(France) Toulouse	Liverpool, England
20:00 BST (UTC+1)	Jota 9'; Endō 30'; Núñez 34'; Gravenberch 65'; Elliott (yellow card) 75'; Salah 90+3'	Report	Dallinga 16'	Stadium: Anfield; Attendance: 51,210; Referee: Rade Obrenović (Slovenia)

9 November 2023 4	Toulouse (France)	3–2	(England) Liverpool	Toulouse
18:45 CET (UTC+1)	Schmidt (yellow card) 11'; Dønnum 36'; Dallinga 58'; Magri 76'; Kamanzi (yellow card) 90+4'; Restes (yellow card) 90+6'; Nicolaisen (yellow card) 90+7'	Report	Endō (yellow card) 34'; Cásseres 74' (o.g.); Jota 89'; Núñez (yellow card) 90+4'	Stadium: Stadium de Toulouse; Attendance: 32,026; Referee: Georgi Kabakov (Bulgaria)

30 November 2023 5	Toulouse (France)	0–0	(Belgium) Union Saint-Gilloise	Toulouse
21:00 CET (UTC+1)	Sierro (yellow card) 57'	Report	Vanhoutte (yellow card) 15'; Mac Allister (yellow card) 34'; Amoura (yellow card) 56'; Sadiki (yellow card) 90+3'	Stadium: Stadium de Toulouse; Attendance: 31,205; Referee: Matej Jug (Slovenia)

14 December 2023 6	LASK (Austria)	1–2	(France) Toulouse	Linz, Austria
18:45 CET (UTC+1)	Ljubičić (yellow card) 35', (goal) 61'; Žulj (yellow card) 47'; Horvath (yellow card) 90+5'	Report	Dallinga 54'; Mawissa (yellow card) 74'; Suazo 83'; Dønnum (yellow card) 90+3'	Stadium: Raiffeisen Arena; Attendance: 16,100; Referee: Fabio Maresca (Italy)

==== Knockout phase ====
===== Knockout round play-offs =====
The draw for the knockout round play-offs was held on 18 December 2023.

15 February 2024 First leg	Benfica (Portugal)	2–1	(France) Toulouse	Lisbon, Portugal
21:00 WET (UTC+0)	Di María 68' (pen.), 90+8' (pen.); Kökçü (yellow card) 90+2'	Report	Spierings (yellow card) 37'; Desler (yellow card) 43', (goal) 75'; Restes (yellow card) 58'; Skyttä (yellow card) 90+2'; Mawissa (yellow card) 90+2' (yellow-red card) 90+6'; Magri (yellow card) 90+7'	Stadium: Estádio da Luz; Attendance: 56,553; Referee: Donatas Rumšas (Lithuania)

22 February 2024 Second leg	Toulouse (France)	0–0 (1–2 agg.)	(Portugal) Benfica	Toulouse
18:45 CET (UTC+1)	Dønnum (yellow card) 15'; Suazo (yellow card) 74'; Kamanzi (yellow card) 83'	Report	Bah (yellow card) 84'	Stadium: Stadium de Toulouse; Attendance: 31,810; Referee: Maurizio Mariani (Italy)

== Statistics ==
=== Appearances and goals ===
As of 10 March 2024

No.	Pos	Nat	Player	Total		Ligue 1		Coupe de France		Trophée des Champions		UEFA Europa League	
No.	Pos	Nat	Player	Apps	Goals	Apps	Goals	Apps	Goals	Apps	Goals	Apps	Goals
Goalkeepers
1	GK	(France) FRA	Thomas Himeur	0	0	0	0	0	0	0	0	0	0
30	GK	(Spain) ESP	Álex Domínguez	2	0	0	0	2	0	0	0	0	0
50	GK	(France) FRA	Guillaume Restes	33	0	24	0	0	0	1	0	8	0
Defenders
2	DF	(Denmark) DEN	Rasmus Nicolaisen	34	2	24	1	1	1	1	0	8	0
3	DF	(Denmark) DEN	Mikkel Desler	25	1	18	0	0	0	0	0	7	1
6	DF	(Cape Verde) CPV	Logan Costa	28	1	21	1	0	0	0	0	7	0
12	DF	(Norway) NOR	Warren Kamanzi	25	0	16	0	2	0	1	0	6	0
13	DF	(France) FRA	Christian Mawissa	15	2	10	2	2	0	1	0	2	0
17	DF	(Chile) CHI	Gabriel Suazo	32	2	21	0	2	0	1	0	8	2
18	DF	(Sweden) SWE	Oliver Zandén	0	0	0	0	0	0	0	0	0	0
23	DF	(Mali) MLI	Moussa Diarra	24	0	15	0	0	0	1	0	8	0
31	DF	(Cameroon) CMR	Kévin Keben	7	0	4	0	1	0	0	0	2	0
Midfielders
5	MF	(Australia) AUS	Denis Genreau	12	0	8	0	0	0	0	0	4	0
8	MF	(Switzerland) SUI	Vincent Sierro	33	4	22	3	2	1	1	0	8	0
11	MF	(Spain) ESP	César Gelabert	25	1	16	1	2	0	1	0	6	0
15	MF	(Norway) NOR	Aron Dønnum	30	1	20	0	1	0	1	0	8	1
20	MF	(Germany) GER	Niklas Schmidt	22	1	16	1	1	0	0	0	5	0
22	MF	(Finland) FIN	Naatan Skyttä	12	2	7	0	2	2	1	0	2	0
24	MF	(Venezuela) VEN	Cristian Cásseres Jr.	32	0	22	0	2	0	1	0	7	0
Forwards
7	FW	(Morocco) MAR	Zakaria Aboukhlal	6	3	5	3	0	0	0	0	1	0
9	FW	(Netherlands) NED	Thijs Dallinga	34	14	23	9	2	1	1	0	8	4
10	FW	(Netherlands) NED	Ibrahim Cissoko	13	0	9	0	2	0	1	0	1	0
19	FW	(Cameroon) CMR	Frank Magri	30	5	21	4	0	0	1	0	8	1
Players transferred out during the season
14	FW	(Morocco) MAR	Yanis Begraoui	18	0	14	0	1	0	0	0	3	0
21	MF	(Burkina Faso) BFA	Mamady Bangré	8	0	8	0	0	0	0	0	0	0

Source: Competitions
