= Naatan Skyttä =

Finnish footballer (born 2002)

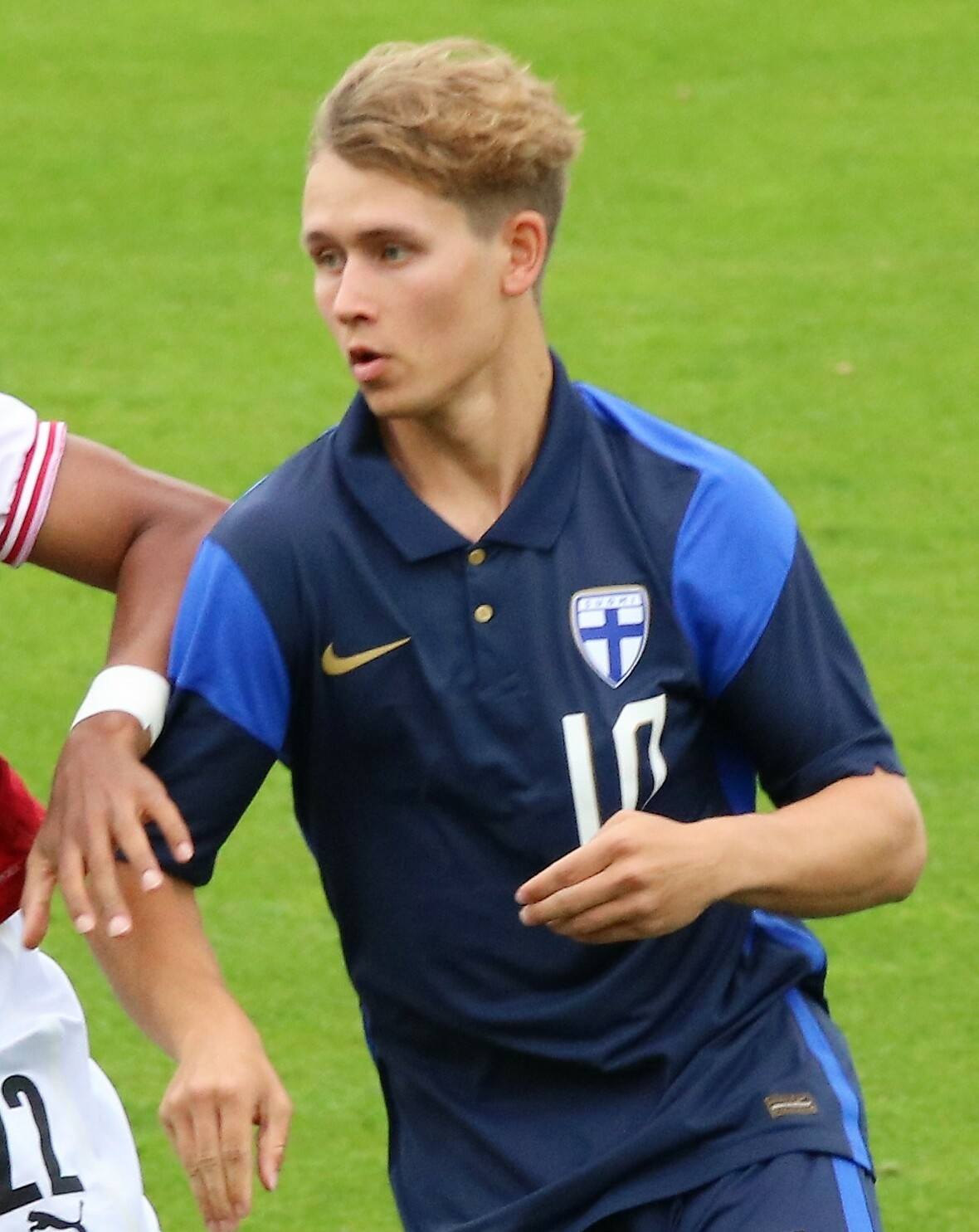
- Skyttä playing for Finland U21 in 2022

Personal information
- Full name: Naatan Mikael Skyttä
- Date of birth: 7 May 2002 (age 24)
- Place of birth: Ylöjärvi, Finland
- Height: 1.74 m (5 ft 9 in)
- Position: Midfielder

Team information
- Current team: 1. FC Kaiserslautern
- Number: 15

Youth career
- Ilves

Senior career*
Years	Team	Apps	(Gls)
2018–2020	Ilves	29	(9)
2018	→ HJS (loan)	1	(1)
2019	→ Ilves II	10	(0)
2021–2024	Toulouse	24	(0)
2021	Toulouse B	4	(3)
2022	→ Viking (loan)	10	(0)
2023	→ OB (loan)	8	(2)
2024–2025	Dunkerque	30	(7)
2025–	1. FC Kaiserslautern	32	(9)

International career^{‡}
2018–2019	Finland U17	12	(4)
2019	Finland U19	2	(0)
2020–2025	Finland U21	29	(12)
2025–	Finland	7	(1)
- * Club domestic league appearances and goals as of 18 May 2026 ‡ National team caps and goals as of 15 November 2026

Naatan Mikael Skyttä (born 7 May 2002) is a Finnish professional footballer who plays as a midfielder for German 2. Bundesliga club 1. FC Kaiserslautern and the Finland national team.

== Club career ==
=== Ilves ===
A product of the Ilves youth academy, Skyttä signed his first professional contract with Ilves first team in 2018. He debuted in Finnish top-tier Veikkausliiga with Ilves first team in the 2018 season.

=== Toulouse ===
Skyttä signed with French club Toulouse on 1 February 2021 on a deal until 30 June 2025. The transfer fee was reported to be €500,000. Skyttä made his debut for Toulouse on 20 April 2021, in a Coupe de France quarter final match against Rumilly-Vallières. On 24 July 2021, Skyttä debuted in Ligue 2 in a match against Ajaccio.

He scored his first goal for Toulouse on 8 January 2023, in a Coupe de France win over Lannion.

==== Viking FK (loan) ====
On 26 August 2022, he joined Norwegian Eliteserien club Viking on loan for the remainder of the 2022 season, without an option to buy.

==== Odense Boldklub (loan) ====
On 31 January 2023, after a brief return to Toulouse, Skyttä signed a loan deal with Danish club OB for the rest of the season, without an option to buy. He scored his first goal for OB in Superliga on 16 April 2023, in a 2–0 victory over Silkeborg.

On 9 May 2023, it was announced that Skyttä had suffered a shinbone fracture in the Superliga match and he was ruled out of games for several months.

==== Return to Toulouse ====
Skyttä returned to Toulouse line-up for the UEFA Europa League group stage match against LASK on 5 October 2023, but remained an unused substitute. He made his first appearance after the injury on 29 October 2023, in a Ligue 1 match against Montpellier, coming in from the bench on the 70th minute. On 7 January 2024, he scored the first goals after his injury, a brace in a Coupe de France win against Chambéry.

=== Dunkerque ===
Skyttä signed with French Ligue 2 club USL Dunkerque on 28 August 2024 on a deal until 30 June 2026 for an undisclosed fee. Two days later, he debuted with his new club in Ligue 2, as a late substitute in a 1–0 home win against Rodez. He was named the player of the month of his team in September. He repeated as his team's player of the month in October, after starting the season scoring four goals and providing three assists in the Ligue 2, an also in March 2025. During his first season with Dunkerque, Skyttä made 30 appearances in Ligue 2, scoring seven goals and providing four assists, as the team finished 4th in the table and reached the promotion play-offs, as a lower-budget team. They also advanced to the 2024–25 Coupe de France semi-finals against PSG.

=== Kaiserslautern ===
On 4 August 2025, Skyttä moved to 1. FC Kaiserslautern in German 2. Bundesliga after signing a three-year deal for a €1.8 million fee. Skyttä became the fourth Finnish player in Kaiserslautern, after Mika Nurmela, Aki Riihilahti and Alexander Ring. On 31 August, he scored his first goal for Kaiserslautern, in a 3–1 win against Darmstadt. On 19 September, Skyttä scored his third goal of the season, in a 4–1 home win against Preußen Münster, extending his scoring streak to three consecutive matches. On 23 November, Skyttä scored a hat-trick in the first half in a 4–1 home win over Holstein Kiel.

== International career ==
Skyttä is a regular Finnish youth international. In the 2023 UEFA Euro Under-21 Championship qualification campaign, Skyttä scored 6 goals in 10 matches.

On 15 October 2024, in the last match of the 2025 UEFA European Under-21 Championship qualification against Montenegro, Skyttä scored a brace and helped Finland to 2–1 victory and thus securing the spot to the qualification play-offs, after Finland finished 2nd in the Group E. Finland eventually qualified for the final tournament after defeating Norway in the play-offs. Skyttä also scored a goal for Finland in the tournament's last group stage match against Denmark, helping his side to get a 2–2 draw.

== Career statistics ==
As of 19 May 2026

Appearances and goals by club, season and competition
Club	Season	League			National cup (Note: Includes Finnish Cup, Coupe de France, Norwegian Cup, DFB-Pokal)		Continental		Other		Total	
Club	Season	Division	Apps	Goals	Apps	Goals	Apps	Goals	Apps	Goals	Apps	Goals
HJS	2018	Kakkonen	1	1	—		—		—		1	1
Ilves II	2019	Kakkonen	10	0	0	0	—		—		10	0
Ilves	2018	Veikkausliiga	2	0	0	0	—		—		2	0
Ilves	2019	Veikkausliiga	11	2	3	0	—		—		14	2
Ilves	2020	Veikkausliiga	16	7	1	0	1 (Note: Appearance(s) in UEFA Europa League)	0	—		18	7
Ilves	Total		29	9	4	0	1	0	0	0	34	9
Toulouse	2020–21	Ligue 2	0	0	1	0	—		—		1	0
Toulouse	2021–22	Ligue 2	13	0	4	0	—		—		17	0
Toulouse	2022–23	Ligue 1	2	0	2	1	—		—		4	1
Toulouse	2023–24	Ligue 1	8	0	2	2	2	0	1 (Note: Appearance in French Super Cup)	0	13	2
Toulouse	2024–25	Ligue 1	1	0	0	0	—		—		1	0
Toulouse	Total		24	0	9	3	2	0	1	0	36	3
Toulouse B	2021–22	National 3	4	3	—		—		—		4	3
Viking (loan)	2022	Eliteserien	10	0	1	0	—		—		11	0
OB (loan)	2022–23	Danish Superliga	8	2	0	0	—		—		8	2
Dunkerque	2024–25	Ligue 2	30	7	4	1	—		2 (Note: Appearances in Ligue 1 promotion play-offs)	0	36	8
FC Kaiserslautern	2025–26	2. Bundesliga	32	9	2	1	—		—		34	10
Career total			147	32	20	5	3	0	3	0	173	37

=== International ===
As of match played 15 November 2026

National team	Year	Competitive		Friendly		Total	
National team	Year	Apps	Goals	Apps	Goals	Apps	Goals
Finland	2025	2 (Note: Appearances in the 2026 FIFA World Cup qualification.)	0	0	0	2	0
Finland	2026	1 (Note: Appearances in the 2026–27 UEFA Nations League C.)	0	4 (Note: Includes two appearances in the 2026 FIFA Series.)	1	5	1
Total		3	0	4	1	7	1

Scores and results list Finland's goal tally first, score column indicates score after each Skyttä goal.

List of international goals scored by Naatan Skyttä
No.	Date	Venue	Cap	Opponent	Score	Result	Competition
1	30 March 2026	Eden Park, Auckland, New Zealand	4	Cape Verde	1–0	1–1 (2–4 p)	2026 FIFA Series

== Honours ==
Ilves

- Finnish Cup: 2019

Toulouse

- Ligue 2: 2021–22
- Coupe de France: 2022–23
- Trophée des Champions runner-up: 2023

Finland

- FIFA Series: 2026

Individual

- Veikkausliiga Team of the Year: 2020
- USL Dunkerque Player of the Month: September 2024, October 2024, March 2025
- FIFA Series Player of the Tournament: 2026
