= Guillaume Restes =

French footballer (born 2005)

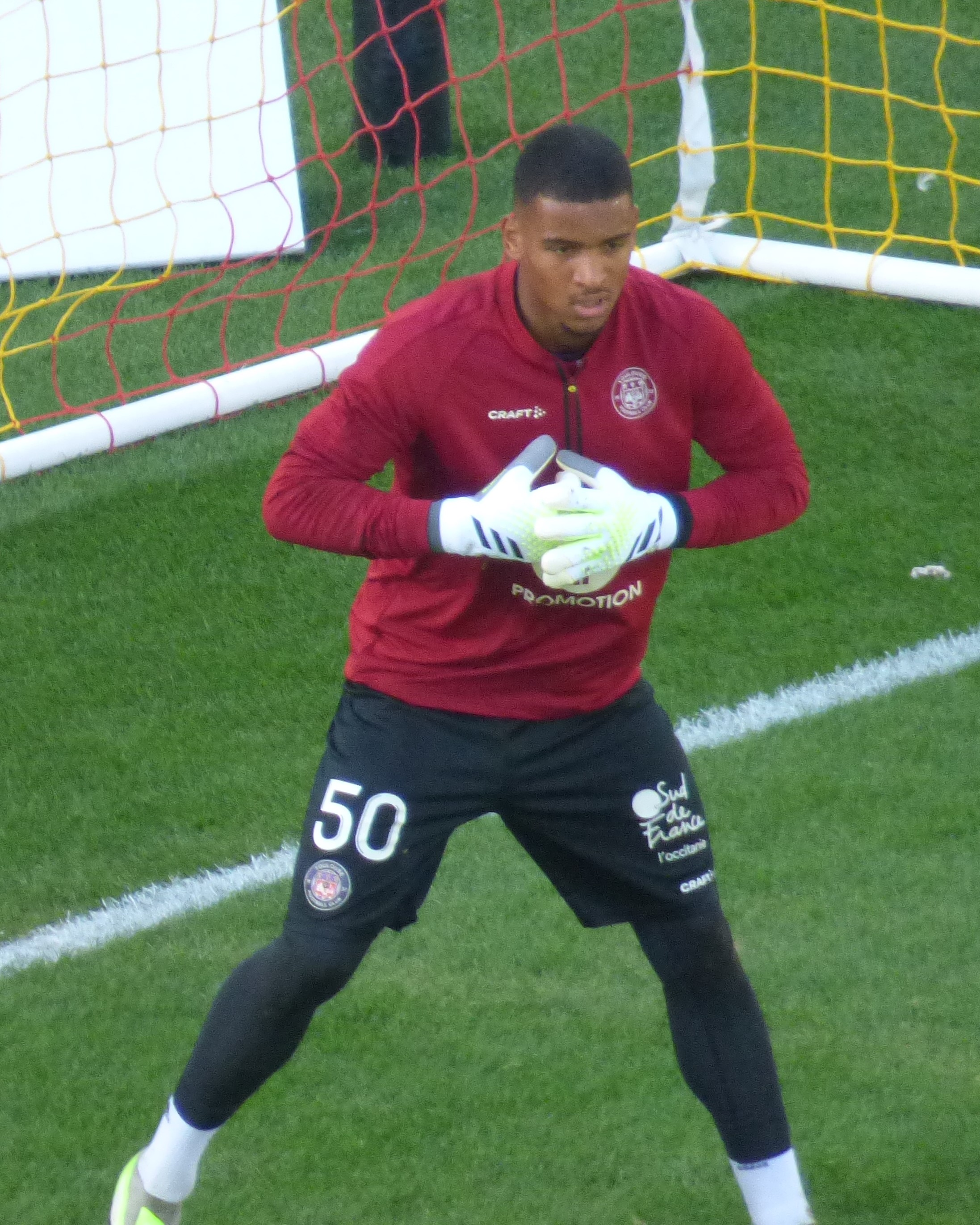
- Restes warming up for Toulouse in 2023

Personal information
- Full name: Guillaume Lino Restes
- Date of birth: 11 March 2005 (age 21)
- Place of birth: Toulouse, Haute-Garonne, France
- Height: 1.88 m (6 ft 2 in)
- Position: Goalkeeper

Team information
- Current team: Toulouse
- Number: 16

Youth career
- 2010–2011: Toulouse Montaudran
- 2011–2023: Toulouse

Senior career*
Years	Team	Apps	(Gls)
2021–2023	Toulouse II	16	(0)
2023–	Toulouse	104	(0)

International career^{‡}
2021–2022	France U17	6	(0)
2022–2023	France U18	2	(0)
2023–	France U21	19	(0)
2024	France Olympic	9	(0)
2026–	France	2	(0)
Medal record
Men's football
Representing France
Olympic Games
Silver medal – second place	Paris 2024	Team
- * Club domestic league appearances and goals as of 25 October 2026 ‡ National team caps and goals as of 15 November 2026

Guillaume Lino Restes (French pronunciation: [ɡijom ʁɛst]; born 11 March 2005) is a French professional footballer who plays as a goalkeeper for Ligue 1 club Toulouse and the France national team.

== Club career ==
=== Toulouse ===
Born in Toulouse, Haute-Garonne, Restes joined the Toulouse academy as a six years old, from the club of the Montaudran suburb.

Restes signed his first professional contract with the club on the summer 2021. His promising performances with the youth team and the National 3 reserve of Toulouse at a young age soon earned him comparisons to former Toulouse player Alban Lafont.

During the 2023 pre-season, despite the arrival of LaLiga2 champion Álex Domínguez and the initial announcement of Coupe de France winner Kjetil Haug as the number 1 goalkeeper, Restes established himself as a potential starter for his club after the departure of Maxime Dupé, playing the entirety of the last summer friendly, a 2–1 home win against Mourinho's AS Roma.

Restes made his professional debut for Toulouse on the 13 August 2023, playing the full 90 minutes of a 2–1 away Ligue 1 win to Nantes, the young goalkeeper earning praises for his decisive performance.

== International career ==
Restes is a youth international for France, having played with the under-17 and under-18 teams.

Having a mother of Ivorian descent, Restes was also potentially eligible for the Ivory Coast national team.

He was one of the 23 players who were called up with the France national team by head coach Zinedine Zidane for the 2026–27 UEFA Nations League matches against Turkey, Belgium and Italy on 25 and 28 September and 2 and 5 October 2026. He made his debut for France in their 4–1 home win against Belgium on 5 October 2026.

== Career statistics ==
As of match played 6 November 2026

Appearances and goals by club, season and competition
Club	Season	League			Coupe de France		Europe		Other		Total	
Club	Season	Division	Apps	Goals	Apps	Goals	Apps	Goals	Apps	Goals	Apps	Goals
Toulouse II	2021–22	Championnat National 3	4	0	—		—		—		4	0
Toulouse II	2022–23	Championnat National 3	12	0	—		—		—		12	0
Toulouse II	Total		16	0	—		—		—		16	0
Toulouse	2023–24	Ligue 1	34	0	0	0	8 (Note: Appearances in UEFA Europa League)	0	1 (Note: Appearance in Trophée des Champions)	0	43	0
Toulouse	2024–25	Ligue 1	29	0	2	0	—		—		31	0
Toulouse	2025–26	Ligue 1	34	0	2	0	—		—		36	0
Toulouse	2026–27	Ligue 1	8	0	0	0	—		—		8	0
Toulouse	Total		105	0	4	0	8	0	1	0	118	0
Career total			121	0	4	0	8	0	1	0	134	0

=== International ===
As of match played 15 November 2026

Appearances and goals by national team and year
National team	Year	Apps	Goals
France U17	2021	3	0
France U17	2022	3	0
France U17	Total	6	0
France U18	2022	1	0
France U18	2023	1	0
France U18	Total	2	0
France U21	2023	6	0
France U21	2024	5	0
France U21	2025	7	0
France U21	2026	1	0
France U21	Total	19	0
France Olympic	2024	9	0
France Olympic	Total	9	0
France	2026	2	0
France	Total	2	0
Total		38	0

== Honours ==
France Olympic

- Summer Olympics silver medal: 2024

Individual

- IFFHS Men's Youth (U20) World Team: 2024
- IFFHS Men's Youth (U20) UEFA Team: 2024

Orders

- Knight of the National Order of Merit: 2024
