= Cristian Cásseres Jr. =

Venezuelan footballer (born 2000)

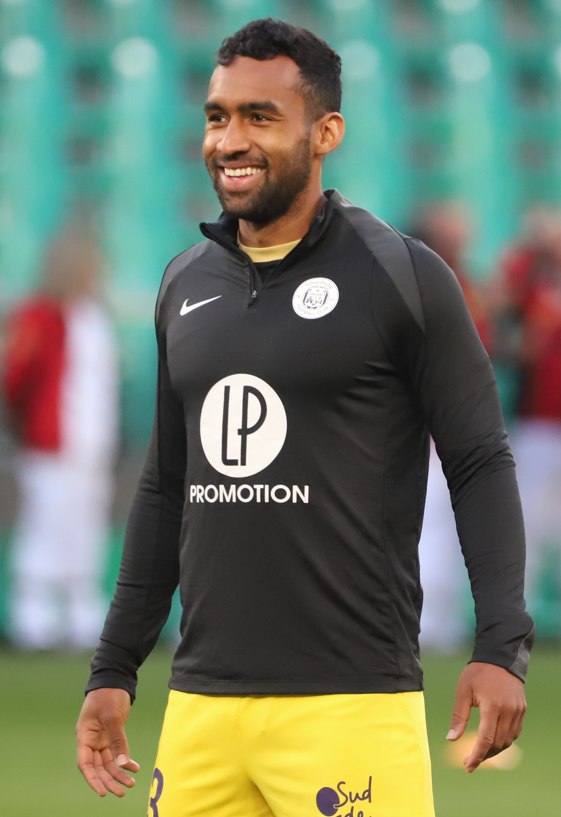
- Cásseres Jr. with Toulouse in 2025

Personal information
- Full name: Cristian Sleiker Cásseres Yépes Jr.
- Date of birth: 20 January 2000 (age 26)
- Place of birth: Caracas, Venezuela
- Height: 1.76 m (5 ft 9 in)
- Position: Midfielder

Team information
- Current team: Toulouse
- Number: 23

Youth career
- Atlético Venezuela
- 2015–2016: Deportivo La Guaira

Senior career*
Years	Team	Apps	(Gls)
2016–2017	Deportivo La Guaira	15	(1)
2018–2023	New York Red Bulls	116	(14)
2018–2019	New York Red Bulls II	28	(3)
2023–	Toulouse	100	(4)

International career^{‡}
2016–2017	Venezuela U17	7	(1)
2017–2019	Venezuela U20	14	(0)
2020–	Venezuela	50	(1)
Medal record
Men's football
Representing Venezuela
FIFA Series
Runner-up	2026 Uzbekistan
- * Club domestic league appearances and goals as of 20 September 2026 ‡ National team caps and goals as of 2 October 2026

Cristian Sleiker Cásseres Yépes Jr. (born 20 January 2000) is a Venezuelan professional footballer who plays as a midfielder for Ligue 1 club Toulouse and the Venezuela national team.

== Club career ==
=== Early ===
Born in Caracas, Venezuela, Cásseres began his career in the youth ranks of Atlético Venezuela playing as a striker. After leaving Atlético he joined the youth ranks of Deportivo La Guaira and was converted into a midfielder. On 27 September 2016, he scored four goals for the Under 20 side of Deportivo in a 4–2 victory over his former club Atlético Venezuela.

=== Deportivo La Guaira ===
On 9 October 2016, Cásseres Jr. made his professional debut for La Guaria at the age of 16 in a Venezuelan Primera División match against Atlético Venezuela, playing 33 minutes in the 3–3 draw. During the 2017 season, Cásseres became a fixture in the starting lineup for La Guaria due to his fine play. On 10 May 2017, Cásseres scored his first goal as a professional in a 3–1 victory over Zulia FC.

=== New York Red Bulls ===
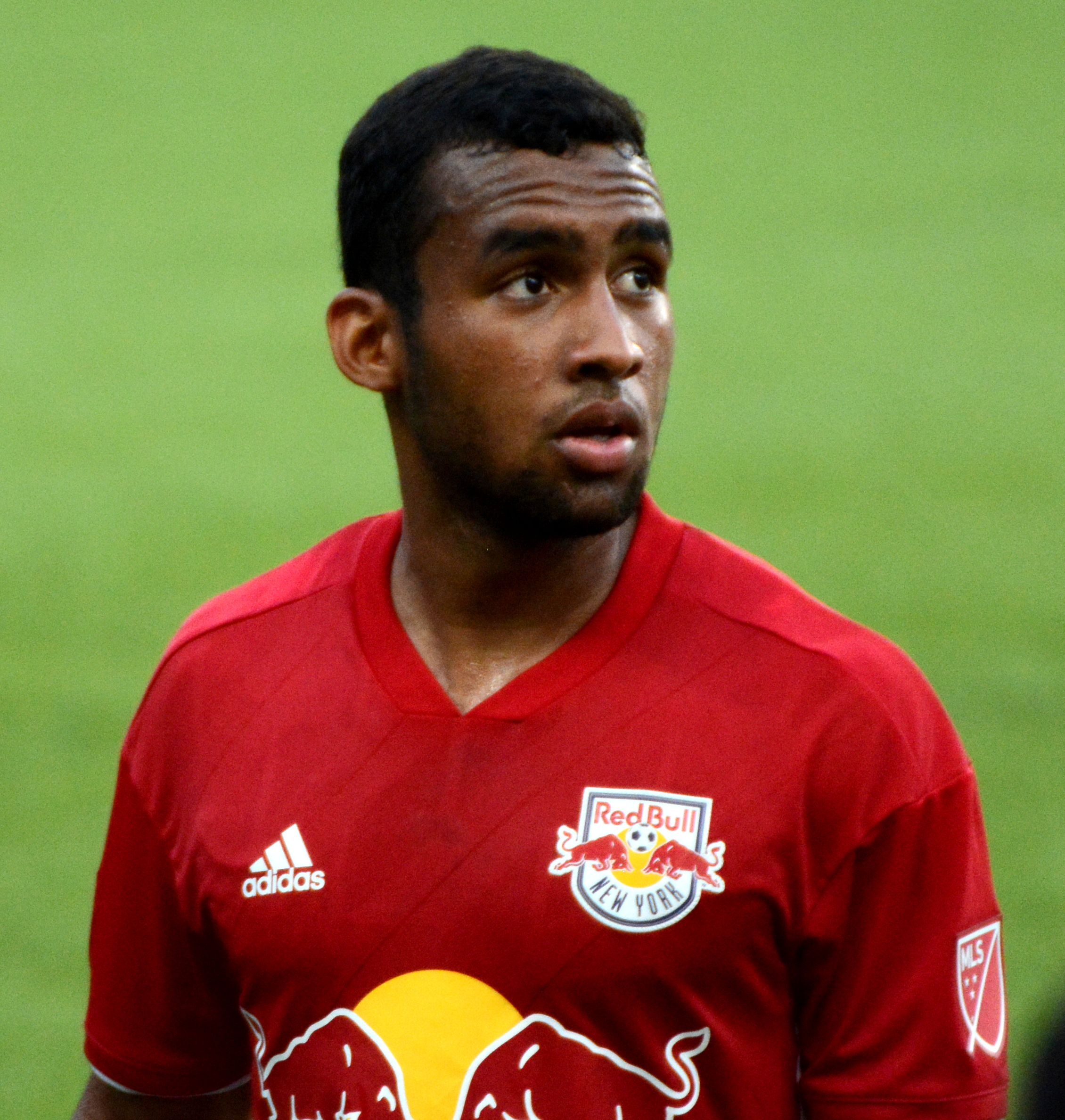
Cásseres Jr. with the New York Red Bulls in 2019

On 2 February 2018, it was announced that Cásseres Jr. had signed with New York Red Bulls in Major League Soccer. Cásseres Jr. was loaned to affiliate side New York Red Bulls II during March 2018. On 17 March 2018, he made his first appearance for Red Bulls II, appearing as second-half substitute in a 2–1 victory over Toronto FC II in the opening match of the season. On 9 June 2018, he scored his first goal for New York, scoring on a penalty kick to help his side to a 4–2 victory over Charlotte Independence.

On 29 August 2018, Cásseres Jr. made his first team debut, appearing as a starter for New York Red Bulls in a 1–0 victory over Houston Dynamo. On 6 April 2019, Cásseres Jr. scored his first goal for New York in a 2–1 loss to Minnesota United. On 8 November, Cásseres Jr. was named the New York Red Bulls Defensive Player of the Year for 2019. For the next several years Cásseres Jr. became a fixture in the Red Bull midfield. On 17 October 2021, Cásseres Jr. scored the winning goal for Red Bulls in 1–0 victory in the Hudson River Derby over rival New York City FC.

On 24 April 2022, Cásseres Jr. scored his first goal of the season for New York in a 3–0 victory over Orlando City SC. On 27 August 2022, Cásseres Jr. recorded two assists in a 3–1 victory against Inter Miami, and was named to the MLS Team of the Week for Week 27. On 31 August 2022, Cásseres Jr. assisted Lewis Morgan on the lone goal of the match in a 1–0 victory over CF Montréal, helping his club register its record ninth road win of the season.

On 24 June 2023, Cásseres Jr. scored his first goal of the season for New York in a 4–0 victory over Atlanta United.

=== Toulouse ===
On 7 July 2023, Cásseres Jr. signed with Ligue 1 side Toulouse for an undisclosed fee.

== International career ==
Cásseres Jr. has featured regularly for his country's U-17 team, playing at the 2017 South American Under-17 Football Championship.

In April 2017, Cásseres Jr. was called into training with the Venezuela under-20 team in preparation for the 2017 FIFA U-20 World Cup.

He made his national team debut on 9 October 2020 in a World Cup qualifier game against Colombia.

== Personal life ==
Cásseres was born into a football family: his father Cristian Cásseres represented the Venezuela national team 28 times, scoring two goals, and also played for Atlético Venezuela's first team while Cristian Jr. played for the U14 team.

== Career statistics ==
=== Club ===
As of match played 20 September 2026

Appearances and goals by club, season and competition
Club	Season	League			National cup		Continental		Other		Total	
Club	Season	Division	Apps	Goals	Apps	Goals	Apps	Goals	Apps	Goals	Apps	Goals
Deportivo La Guaira	2016	Liga FUTVE	2	0	—		—		—		2	0
Deportivo La Guaira	2017	Liga FUTVE	13	1	—		—		—		13	1
Deportivo La Guaira	Total		15	1	—		—		—		15	1
New York Red Bulls	2018	MLS	3	0	—		—		0	0	3	0
New York Red Bulls	2019	MLS	23	3	1	1	0	0	1 (Note: Appearance in MLS Cup playoffs)	0	25	4
New York Red Bulls	2020	MLS	19	2	—		—		1	0	20	2
New York Red Bulls	2021	MLS	27	6	—		—		1	0	28	6
New York Red Bulls	2022	MLS	27	2	4	0	—		—		31	2
New York Red Bulls	2023	MLS	17	1	2	0	—		—		19	1
New York Red Bulls	Total		116	14	7	1	0	0	3	0	126	15
New York Red Bulls II (loan)	2018	USL Championship	26	3	—		—		—		26	3
New York Red Bulls II (loan)	2019	USL Championship	2	0	—		—		—		2	0
New York Red Bulls II (loan)	Total		28	3	—		—		—		28	3
Toulouse	2023–24	Ligue 1	32	1	2	0	7 (Note: Appearances in UEFA Europa League)	0	1 (Note: Appearances in Trophée des Champions)	0	42	1
Toulouse	2024–25	Ligue 1	32	1	2	0	—		—		34	1
Toulouse	2025–26	Ligue 1	31	2	4	0	—		—		35	2
Toulouse	2026–27	Ligue 1	5	0	0	0	—		—		5	0
Toulouse	Total		100	4	8	0	7	0	1	0	116	4
Career total			259	22	15	1	7	0	4	0	285	23

=== International ===
As of match played 2 October 2026

Appearances and goals by national team and year
National team	Year	Apps	Goals
Venezuela	2020	4	0
Venezuela	2021	9	0
Venezuela	2022	6	0
Venezuela	2023	7	0
Venezuela	2024	8	0
Venezuela	2025	10	0
Venezuela	2026	6	1
Total		50	1

Scores and results list Venezuela's goal tally first.

List of international goals scored by Cristian Cásseres Jr.
No.	Date	Venue	Cap	Opponent	Score	Result	Competition
1	9 June 2026	SeatGeek Stadium, Bridgeview, United States	48	Iraq	1–0	2–0	Friendly

== Honours ==
New York Red Bulls

- MLS Supporters' Shield: 2018

Toulouse

- Trophée des Champions runner-up: 2023

Venezuela

- FIFA Series runner-up: 2026
