= Noah Edjouma =

French footballer (born 2005)

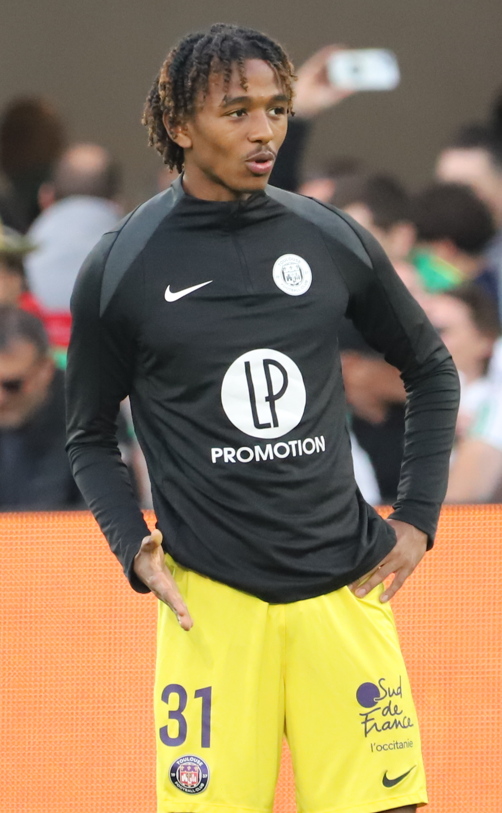
- Edjouma with Toulouse in 2025

Personal information
- Date of birth: 4 October 2005 (age 21)
- Place of birth: Clamart, France
- Height: 1.81 m (5 ft 11 in)
- Position: Forward

Team information
- Current team: Brest (on loan from Lille)
- Number: 11

Youth career
- 2010–2012: Lavaur
- 2012–2013: Toulouse Fontaines
- 2013–2023: Toulouse

Senior career*
| Years | Team | Apps | (Gls) |
| 2023–2024 | Toulouse II | 27 | (7) |
| 2024–2026 | Toulouse | 22 | (2) |
| 2026– | Lille | 3 | (0) |
| 2026– | → Brest (loan) | 0 | (0) |

International career^{‡}
| 2022 | France U18 | 2 | (1) |
| 2024–2025 | France U20 | 8 | (0) |
| 2025– | France U21 | 3 | (0) |
- * Club domestic league appearances and goals as of 8 March 2026 ‡ National team caps and goals as of 8 September 2025

Noah Edjouma (born 4 October 2005) is a French professional footballer who plays as a forward for Ligue 1 club Brest, on loan from Lille.

== Club career ==
=== Toulouse ===
Born in Clamart in Hauts-de-Seine, Edjouma began playing football for Lavaur in 2010. In 2012, he joined Toulouse Fontaines, and a year later Toulouse FC. With Toulouse's under-17 team, he was a national champion in 2022.

In March 2023, 17-year-old Edjouma signed his first professional contract at Toulouse, for three years with the option of a fourth. He made his debut on 7 January 2024 in the round of 64 of the Coupe de France, in which his club was the title holder. Away to Championnat National 3 club Chambéry SF, he came on as an 82nd-minute substitute in a 3–0 win; shortly after entering the game he shot against the crossbar, and Thijs Dallinga scored from the rebound. Two weeks later in the next round away to Rouen of the Championnat National, he came on with three minutes remaining of a 3–3 draw and scored his attempt in the penalty shootout, though his side lost 12–11.

On 9 February 2025, Edjouma made his Ligue 1 debut for Toulouse in a 2–2 draw away to Auxerre, scoring the final goal of the game.

=== Lille ===
On 2 February 2026, Edjouma signed a four-and-a-half-year contract with Lille. The transfer fee was €5 million. He made his debut four days later in a goalless draw away to Metz; manager Bruno Génésio explained that his system was to have Edjouma and Matias Fernandez-Pardo as wingers in support of centre-forward Olivier Giroud.

==== Loan to Brest ====
On 1 September 2026, Edjouma joined Brest on loan for the 2026–27 season.

== International career ==
In November 2022, Edjouma was called up by the France under-18 team for two friendly matches against Italy at INF Clairefontaine. He came on as a substitute in both and scored in the latter, a 3–0 win on 20 November.

Edjouma was first called up to the under-20 side by manager Bernard Diomède in September 2022, as a late injury replacement for two warm-up games against Switzerland.

Edjouma was called up by the France under-21 side for the 2025 UEFA European Championship in Slovakia.

== Personal life ==
Edjouma was born in France to a Cameroonian father and Moroccan mother. His older brother, Malcom (born 1996), is also a footballer. A midfielder, he represented several clubs in France and FCSB in Romania.

== Career statistics ==
As of match played 19 March 2026

Appearances and goals by club, season and competition
| Club | Season | League | | | Cup | | Europe | | Total | |
| Club | Season | Division | Apps | Goals | Apps | Goals | Apps | Goals | Apps | Goals |
|---|---|---|---|---|---|---|---|---|---|---|
| Toulouse II | 2023–24 | CFA 2 | 21 | 3 | — | | — | | 21 | 3 |
| Toulouse II | 2024–25 | National 3 | 6 | 4 | — | | — | | 6 | 4 |
| Toulouse II | Total | | 27 | 7 | — | | — | | 27 | 7 |
| Toulouse | 2023–24 | Ligue 1 | 0 | 0 | 2 | 0 | — | | 2 | 0 |
| Toulouse | 2024–25 | Ligue 1 | 10 | 2 | 1 | 0 | — | | 11 | 2 |
| Toulouse | 2025–26 | Ligue 1 | 12 | 0 | 1 | 0 | — | | 13 | 0 |
| Toulouse | Total | | 22 | 2 | 4 | 0 | — | | 26 | 2 |
| Lille | 2025–26 | Ligue 1 | 3 | 0 | — | | 2 (Note: Appearances in UEFA Europa League) | 0 | 5 | 0 |
| Career total | | | 52 | 9 | 4 | 0 | 2 | 0 | 58 | 9 |

== Honours ==
France U20

- Maurice Revello Tournament: 2025
