= Warren Kamanzi =

Norwegian footballer (born 2000)

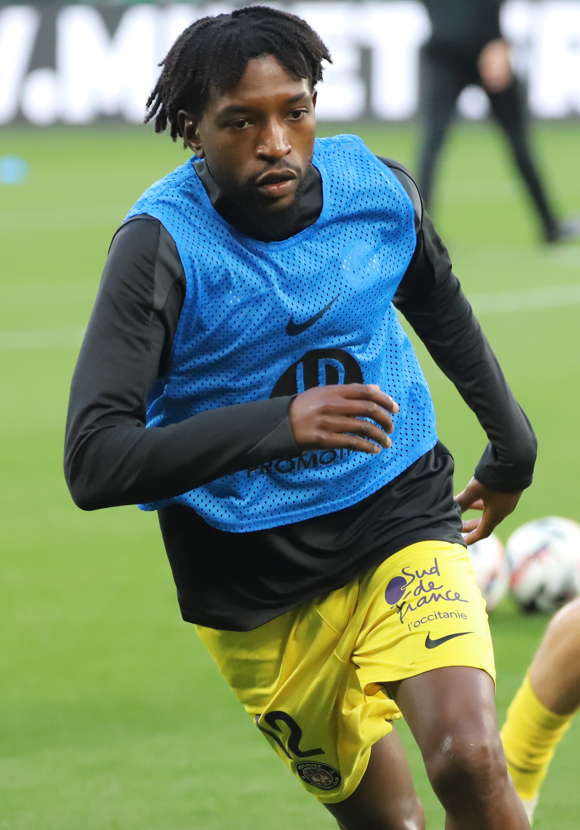
- Kamanzi with Toulouse in 2025

Personal information
- Full name: Warren Håkon Christofer Kamanzi
- Date of birth: 11 November 2000 (age 26)
- Place of birth: Namsos Municipality, Norway
- Height: 1.77 m (5 ft 10 in)
- Position: Right-back

Team information
- Current team: Malmö
- Number: 14

Youth career
- –2014: Strindheim
- 2015–2019: Rosenborg

Senior career*
Years	Team	Apps	(Gls)
2020–2021	Rosenborg	0	(0)
2021	→ Ranheim (loan)	19	(2)
2022	Tromsø	28	(4)
2023–2026	Toulouse	83	(2)
2026–	Malmö FF	0	(0)

International career^{‡}
2022–2023	Norway U21	3	(0)
- * Club domestic league appearances and goals as of 16 July 2026 ‡ National team caps and goals as of 5 February 2024

Warren Håkon Christofer Kamanzi (born 11 November 2000) is a Norwegian professional footballer who plays as a right-back for Allsvenskan club Malmö FF.

== Club career ==
=== Rosenborg ===
Kamanzi came to Rosenborg's academy from Strindheim in 2015. He also played futsal for Vegakameratene during the 2019–20 season.

In 2020 he signed a contract to become a part of the first team squad. In 2021, he was loaned out to Ranheim in the Norwegian First Division for the entire season.

=== Tromsø ===
At the start of 2022, Kamanzi signed for Tromsø. In the last match of 2022 Eliteserien, pundits discussed whether Kamanzi had performed the "assist of the year", following a rabona assist against Aalesund.

=== Toulouse ===
On 2 January 2023, Kamanzi signed for Ligue 1 club Toulouse in a transfer worth €600,000. He signed a contract until 2026.

=== Malmö FF ===
On 16 July 2026, Kamanzi signed a contract until the end of 2029 with Malmö FF in Sweden.

== International career ==
In the autumn of 2022, Kamanzi was called up to the Rwanda national team. For the time being, he declined the call-up, hoping to instead be called up to the Norwegian under-21 team some time before the 2023 UEFA European Under-21 Championship. His first under-21 callup then came on 18 September 2022. Kamanzi featured in a victory over Switzerland at Marbella, before drawing 1–1 away in France in November 2022.

== Career statistics ==
As of 21 May 2026

Appearances and goals by club, season and competition
Club	Season	League			National cup (Note: Includes Norwegian Football Cup, Coupe de France)		Europe		Other		Total	
Club	Season	Division	Apps	Goals	Apps	Goals	Apps	Goals	Apps	Goals	Apps	Goals
Rosenborg	2020	Eliteserien	0	0	—		1 (Note: Appearances in UEFA Europa League)	0	—		1	0
Ranheim	2021	OBOS-ligaen	19	2	3	0	—		—		22	2
Tromsø	2022	Eliteserien	28	4	3	1	—		—		31	5
Toulouse	2022–23	Ligue 1	11	0	4	0	—		—		15	0
Toulouse	2023–24	Ligue 1	24	0	2	0	6	0	1 (Note: Appearances in Trophée des Champions)	0	32	0
Toulouse	2024–25	Ligue 1	24	1	0	0	0	0	0	0	24	1
Toulouse	2025–26	Ligue 1	24	1	4	0	0	0	0	0	28	1
Toulouse	Total		83	2	10	0	6	0	1	0	100	1
Career total			130	8	16	1	7	0	1	0	154	9

== Honours ==
Toulouse

- Coupe de France: 2022–23
- Trophée des Champions runner up: 2023
