= Álex Domínguez =

Spanish footballer

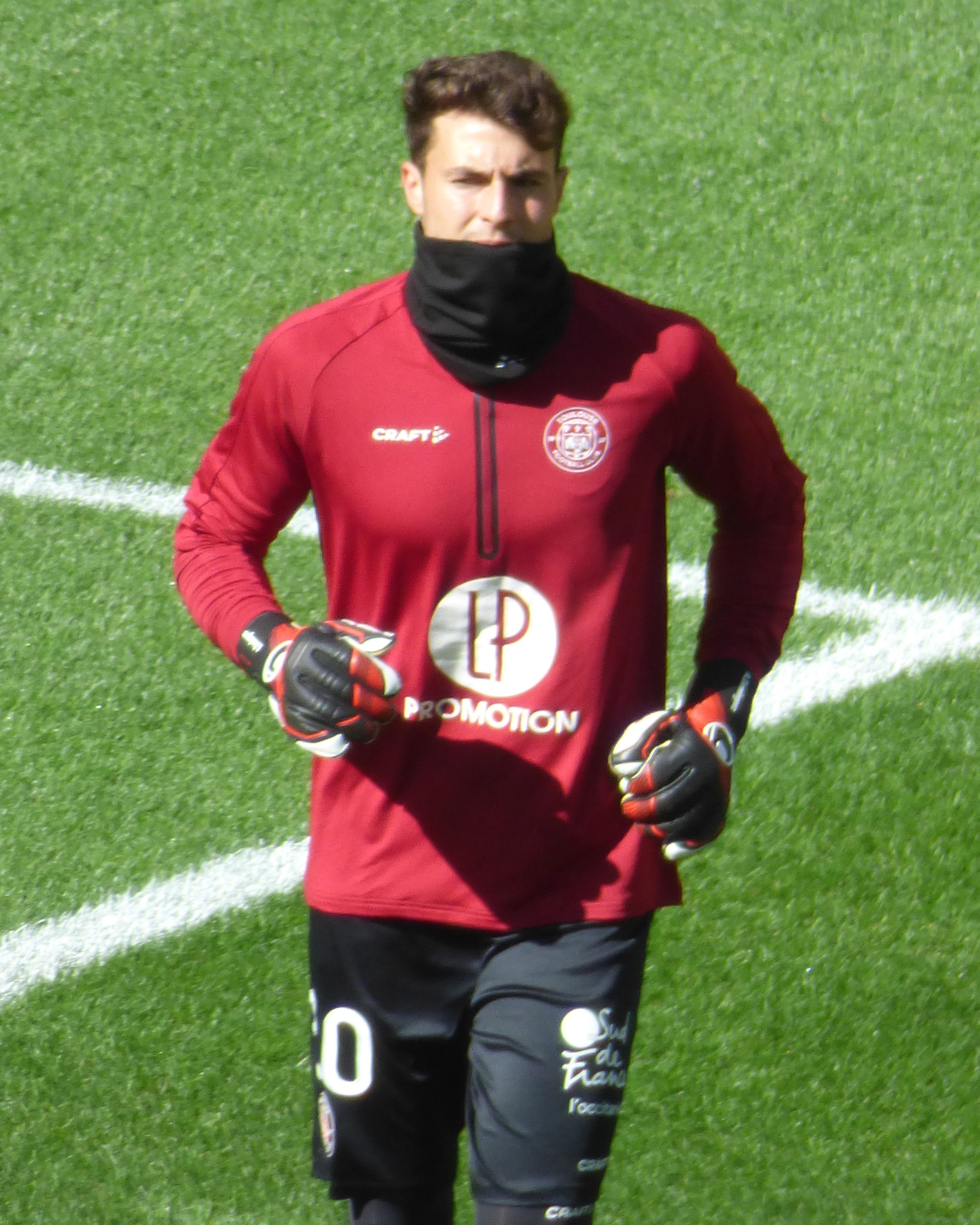
- Domínguez warming up for Toulouse in 2023

Personal information
- Full name: Alejandro Domínguez Romero
- Date of birth: 30 July 1998 (age 28)
- Place of birth: Granollers, Spain
- Height: 1.87 m (6 ft 2 in)
- Position: Goalkeeper

Team information
- Current team: Ponferradina

Youth career
- Sabadell
- 2015–2017: Espanyol
- 2016–2017: → Damm (loan)

Senior career*
Years	Team	Apps	(Gls)
2014–2015	Sabadell B	2	(0)
2017–2018	Espanyol B	14	(0)
2018–2019	Alavés B	22	(0)
2019–2020	Las Palmas B	25	(0)
2020–2023	Las Palmas	26	(0)
2021–2022	→ Ibiza (loan)	10	(0)
2023–2026	Toulouse	1	(0)
2025	→ Eibar (loan)	0	(0)
2026–	Ponferradina	0	(0)
- * Club domestic league appearances and goals as of 17 May 2026

Alejandro "Álex" Domínguez Romero (born 30 July 1998) is a Spanish professional footballer who plays as a goalkeeper for Primera Federación club Ponferradina.

== Career ==
Born in Granollers, Barcelona, Catalonia, Domínguez represented CE Sabadell FC as a youth before making his senior debut with the reserves on 6 December 2014, starting in a 2–1 Tercera División home loss against UE Castelldefels. After one further match for the B-side, he moved to RCD Espanyol and was assigned back to the youth setup.

In 2016, Domínguez was loaned to CF Damm for one year, to finish his formation; upon returning, he was assigned to Espanyol's B-team also in the fourth division. He featured sparingly for the side, and renewed his contract until 2020 on 22 March 2018.

On 10 July 2018, after achieving promotion, Domínguez agreed to a three-year deal with another reserve team, Deportivo Alavés B still in division four. On 28 August of the following year, after another promotion, he moved to UD Las Palmas and was initially assigned to the B-side in the Segunda División B.

Domínguez made his first team debut on 20 July 2020, starting in a 5–1 home routing of Extremadura UD in the Segunda División. He began the 2020–21 campaign as a backup to Álvaro Valles, but was made a starter by manager Pepe Mel in November after a poor run of form from Valles.

On 27 July 2021, after losing his starting spot back to Valles, Domínguez was loaned to second division newcomers UD Ibiza for a year. Upon returning, he was again a backup to Valles as the club achieved promotion to La Liga.

On 26 July 2023, Domínguez moved abroad and signed for Ligue 1 side Toulouse FC. On 16 January 2025, he returned to his home country after agreeing to a six-month loan deal with SD Eibar.

On 7 July 2026, Domínguez returned to Spain and signed with Ponferradina in Primera Federación.

== Career statistics ==
As of match played 21 December 2024

Appearances and goals by club, season and competition
Club	Season	League			Cup		Europe		Other		Total	
Club	Season	Division	Apps	Goals	Apps	Goals	Apps	Goals	Apps	Goals	Apps	Goals
Espanyol B	2017–18	Tercera División	14	0	—		—		0	0	14	0
Alavés B	2018–19	Tercera División	22	0	—		—		0	0	22	0
Alavés B	2019–20	Segunda División B	0	0	—		—		—		0	0
Alavés B	Total		22	0	—		—		0	0	22	0
Alavés	2018–19	La Liga	0	0	0	0	—		—		0	0
Las Palmas B	2019–20	Segunda División B	25	0	—		—		—		25	0
Las Palmas	2019–20	Segunda División	1	0	0	0	—		—		4	0
Las Palmas	2020–21	Segunda División	17	0	0	0	—		—		12	0
Las Palmas	2022–23	Segunda División	8	0	2	0	—		—		10	0
Las Palmas	Total		26	0	2	0	—		—		26	0
Ibiza (loan)	2021–22	Segunda División	10	0	2	0	—		—		12	0
Toulouse	2023–24	Ligue 1	0	0	2	0	0	0	0	0	2	0
Toulouse	2024–25	Ligue 1	1	0	1	0	—		—		2	0
Toulouse	Total		1	0	3	0	0	0	0	0	4	0
Eibar (loan)	2024–25	Segunda División	0	0	—		—		—		0	0
Career total			98	0	7	0	0	0	0	0	105	0
