= Niklas Schmidt =

German footballer (born 1998)

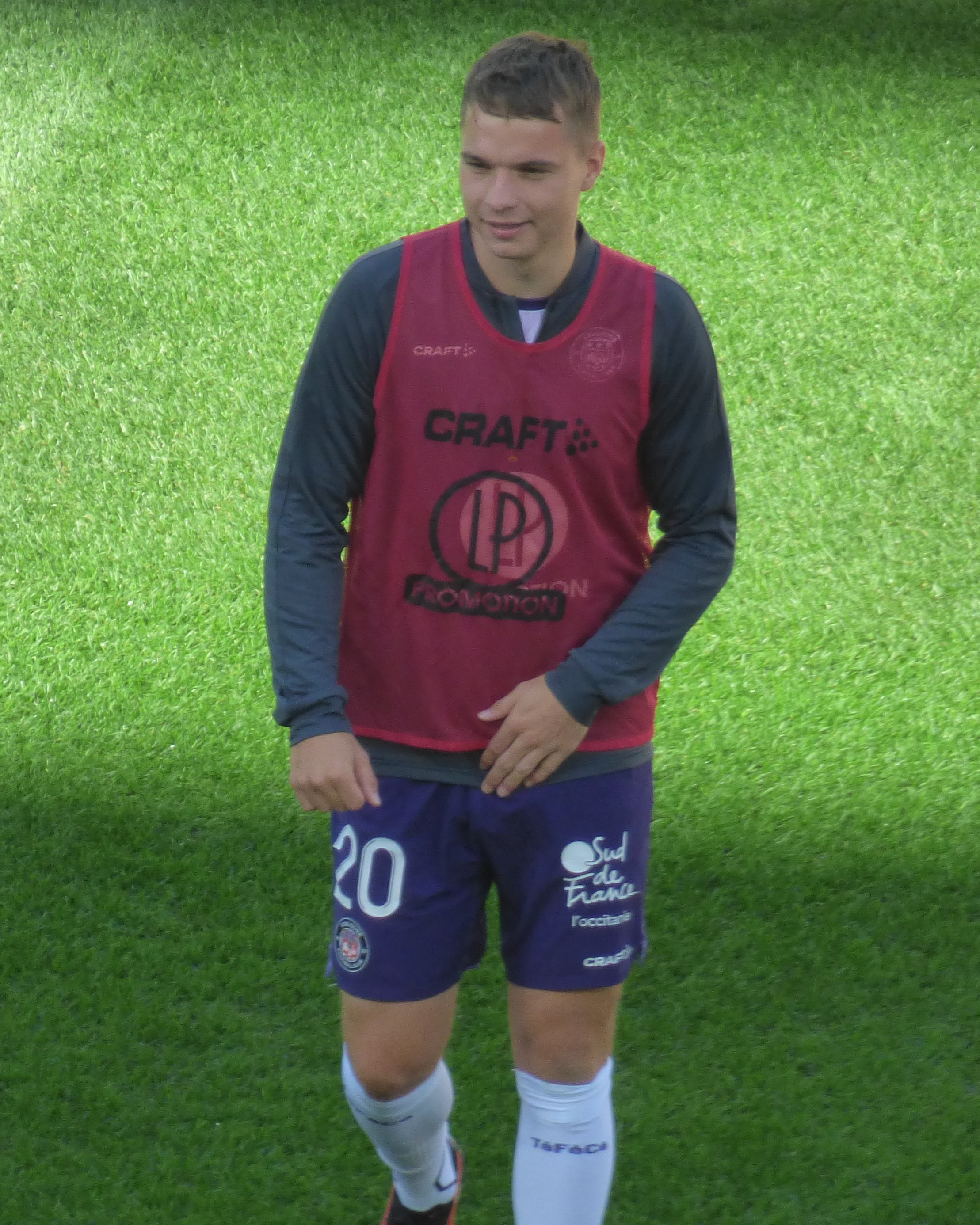
- Schmidt warming up for Toulouse in 2023

Personal information
- Full name: Niklas Uwe Schmidt
- Date of birth: 1 March 1998 (age 28)
- Place of birth: Kassel, Germany
- Height: 1.84 m (6 ft 0 in)
- Position: Midfielder

Team information
- Current team: Toulouse
- Number: 31

Youth career
- –2016: Werder Bremen

Senior career*
Years	Team	Apps	(Gls)
2016–2018	Werder Bremen II	62	(5)
2016–2023	Werder Bremen	50	(5)
2018–2019	→ Wehen Wiesbaden (loan)	33	(5)
2019–2021	→ VfL Osnabrück (loan)	47	(6)
2023–	Toulouse	31	(1)
2026	→ Darmstadt 98 (loan)	15	(1)

International career^{‡}
2014	Germany U16	2	(2)
2014–2015	Germany U17	17	(7)
2016–2017	Germany U19	8	(3)
Medal record
Men's football
Representing Germany
UEFA European Under-17 Championship
Runner-up	2015 Bulgaria
- * Club domestic league appearances and goals as of 18 May 2026 ‡ National team caps and goals as of 00:19, 30 July 2018 (UTC)

Niklas Uwe Schmidt (born 1 March 1998) is a German professional footballer who plays as a midfielder for Ligue 1 club Toulouse. At international level, he represented Germany's U16, U17, and U19 youth teams.

== Club career ==
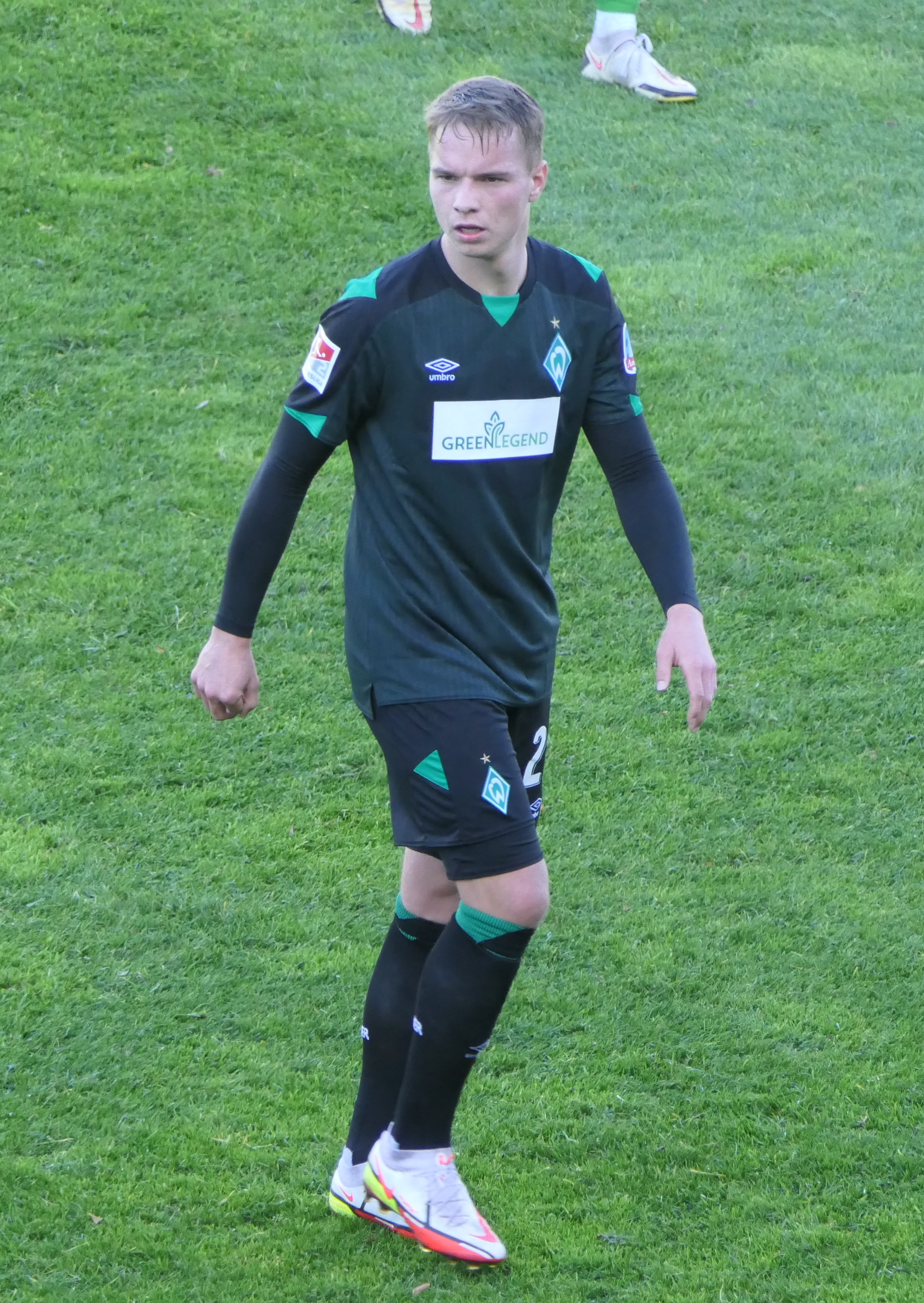
Schmidt playing for Werder Bremen in 2021

Schmidt is a youth exponent from Werder Bremen. He made his 3. Liga debut on 31 July 2016 against Sportfreunde Lotte. He played the full game.

On 24 September 2016, he made his first team debut in the Bundesliga against VfL Wolfsburg coming on as a 76th-minute substitute for captain Clemens Fritz and assisting the 2–1 winner in stoppage time.

In July 2018, Schmidt joined 3. Liga side SV Wehen Wiesbaden on loan for the 2018–19 season while his contract with Werder Bremen was extended.

In June 2019, it was announced he had agreed a "long-term" extension of his contract with Werder Bremen and that he would join VfL Osnabrück on a two-year loan.

Following his return from loan at Osnabrück in summer 2021 Schmidt was expected to leave Werder Bremen. Good performances in pre-season training and matches earned him playing time at the club. In October, having made nine league appearances in which he scored one goal and made four assists, he signed a contract extension.

In August 2023 Schmidt moved to French club Toulouse, playing in the Ligue 1. The transfer fee paid to Werder Bremen was reported as €2.5 million.

On 21 January 2026, Schmidt returned to Germany and joined Darmstadt 98 in 2. Bundesliga on loan, reuniting with former coach Florian Kohfeldt.

== International career ==
Schmidt is a Germany youth international having represented the country at U16, U17, and U19 levels.

== Career statistics ==
As of 4 July 2024

Appearances and goals by club, season and competition
Club	Season	League			Cup		Europe		Other		Total	
Club	Season	Division	Apps	Goals	Apps	Goals	Apps	Goals	Apps	Goals	Apps	Goals
Werder Bremen	2016–17	Bundesliga	1	0	0	0	–		0	0	1	0
Werder Bremen	2021–22	2. Bundesliga	25	2	1	0	–		0	0	26	2
Werder Bremen	2022–23	Bundesliga	24	3	1	0	–		0	0	25	3
Werder Bremen	Total		50	5	2	0	0	0	0	0	52	5
Werder Bremen II	2016–17	3. Liga	32	2	0	0	–		0	0	32	2
Werder Bremen II	2017–18	3. Liga	30	3	0	0	–		0	0	30	3
Werder Bremen II	Total		62	5	0	0	0	0	0	0	62	5
Wehen Wiesbaden (loan)	2018–19	3. Liga	33	5	2	1	–		2 (Note: Appearances in promotion play-offs)	0	37	6
VfL Osnabrück (loan)	2019–20	2. Bundesliga	25	5	0	0	–		0	0	25	5
VfL Osnabrück (loan)	2020–21	2. Bundesliga	22	1	2	0	–		2 (Note: Appearances in relegation play-offs)	0	26	1
VfL Osnabrück (loan)	Total		47	6	2	0	0	0	2	0	51	6
Toulouse	2023–24	Ligue 1	22	1	1	0	5	0	–		28	1
Career total			208	22	7	1	5	0	4	0	224	23
