= César Gelabert =

Spanish footballer

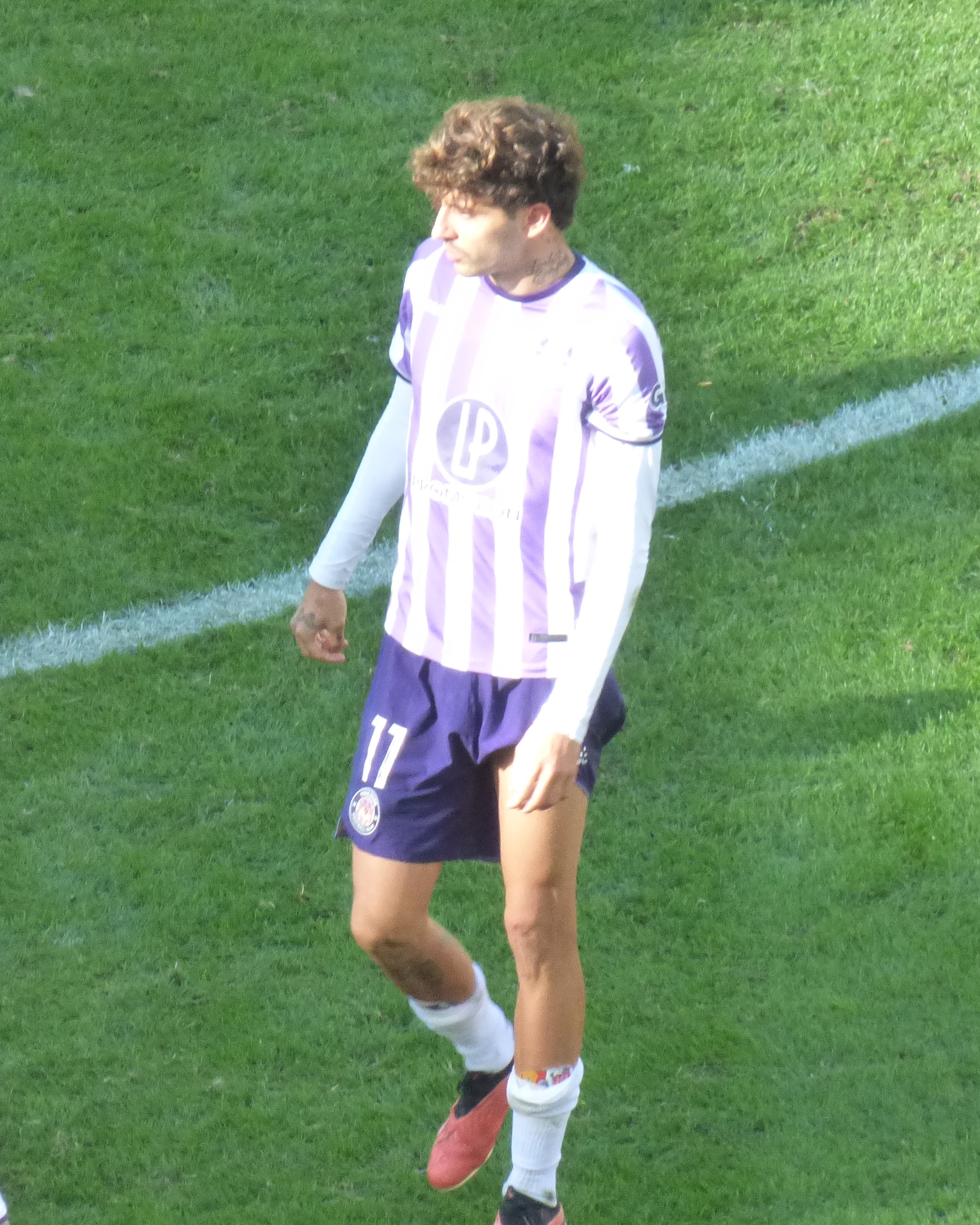
- Gelabert playing for Toulouse in 2023

Personal information
- Full name: César Gelabert Piña
- Date of birth: 31 October 2000 (age 26)
- Place of birth: Palencia, Spain
- Height: 1.82 m (6 ft 0 in)
- Position: Attacking midfielder

Team information
- Current team: Sporting Gijón
- Number: 10

Youth career
- 2006–2008: Albufereta
- 2008–2011: Faro Costa Blanca
- 2011–2015: Hércules
- 2015–2019: Real Madrid

Senior career*
Years	Team	Apps	(Gls)
2018–2021	Real Madrid B	73	(11)
2021–2023	Mirandés	41	(2)
2023–2025	Toulouse	16	(1)
2024–2025	→ Sporting Gijón (loan)	39	(6)
2025–	Sporting Gijón	41	(8)

International career
2017	Spain U17	8	(2)
- * Club domestic league appearances and goals as of 6 June 2026

César Gelabert Piña (born 31 October 2000) is a Spanish footballer who plays as an attacking midfielder for Sporting de Gijón.

== Club career ==
=== Real Madrid ===
Born in Palencia, Castile and León, Gelabert joined Real Madrid's La Fábrica in 2015, from Hércules CF. He made his senior debut with the reserves on 25 February 2018 at the age of just 17, coming on as a late substitute in a 3–0 Segunda División B home win against Pontevedra CF.

Gelabert was definitely promoted to Castilla in June 2018, but suffered a knee injury which kept him sidelined for most of the season. After subsequently overcoming another injury, he scored his first senior goal on 3 November 2019, netting Castilla's first in a 2–4 away loss against Sporting de Gijón B.

After attracting interest from several clubs across Europe during the 2020 summer, Gelabert opted to stay, but was unable to establish himself as a regular starter during the campaign.

=== Mirandés ===
On 5 August 2021, Gelabert signed a two-year deal with Segunda División side CD Mirandés. He made his professional debut eleven days later, starting in a 0–0 away draw against Málaga CF.

In January 2022, Gelabert was sidelined for the remainder of the season after suffering another knee injury. Back to action in August, he scored his first professional goal on 2 November, netting the winner in a 1–0 home success over CD Tenerife.

=== Toulouse ===
On 6 June 2023, Ligue 1 side Toulouse FC announced the signing of Gelabert on a four-year contract. He scored his first goal abroad on 24 September, netting the opener in a 2–1 away loss to RC Lens.

=== Sporting Gijón ===
On 21 August 2024, Gelabert returned to Spain after agreeing to a one-year loan deal with Sporting de Gijón in the second division. On 30 June of the following year, he signed a permanent three-year contract with the club.

== International career ==
Gelabert represented Spain at under-17 level in the 2017 UEFA European Under-17 Championship and the 2017 FIFA U-17 World Cup squads, winning the former competition. Initially called up with the under-19s for the 2019 UEFA European Under-19 Championship, he was forced to miss out the competition due to a broken clavicle.

== Personal life ==
Gelabert's father Juanmi is a retired professional footballer. A defender, he played for several seasons in the second tier, aside from a two-year spell at La Liga side Sevilla FC.
