= Christian Mawissa =

French footballer (born 2005)

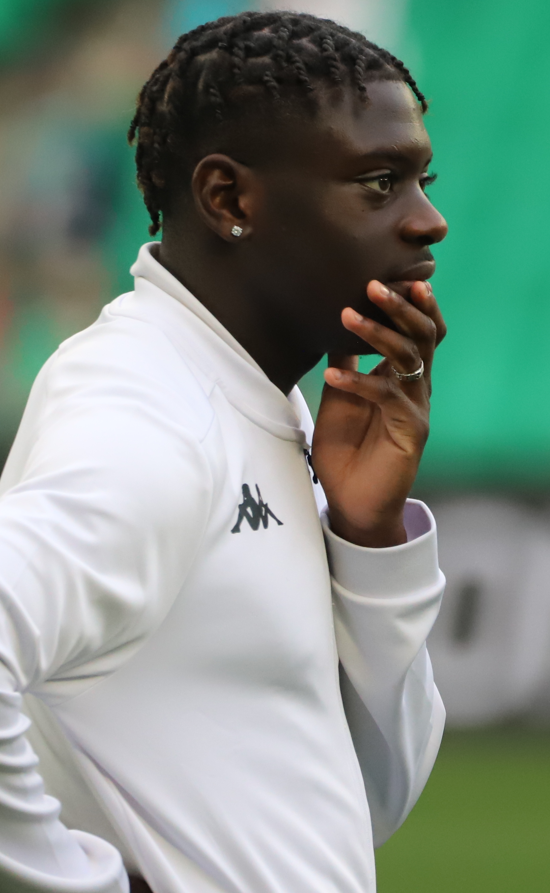
- Mawissa with Monaco in 2025

Personal information
- Full name: Christian Mawissa Elebi
- Date of birth: 18 April 2005 (age 21)
- Place of birth: Saint-Jean-de-Verges, France
- Height: 1.83 m (6 ft 0 in)
- Position: Defender

Team information
- Current team: Monaco
- Number: 13

Youth career
- 2010–2011: FC Pays d'Olmes
- 2011–2015: FC Mirepoix
- 2015–2016: FC Coussatois
- 2016–2017: FC Coussa-Hers
- 2017–2022: Toulouse

Senior career*
Years	Team	Apps	(Gls)
2022–2023	Toulouse II	18	(0)
2022–2024	Toulouse	19	(2)
2024–	Monaco	41	(0)

International career^{‡}
2021–2022	France U17	7	(0)
2022–2023	France U18	6	(0)
2023–2024	France U19	8	(0)
2024	France U20	4	(0)
2024–	France U21	9	(0)
Medal record
Men's football
Representing France
UEFA European Under-17 Championship
Winner	2022 Israel
- * Club domestic league appearances and goals as of 18 October 2026 ‡ National team caps and goals as of 6 October 2026

Christian Mawissa Elebi (born 18 April 2005) is a French professional footballer who plays as a defender for Ligue 1 club Monaco.

== Club career ==
Mawissa is a youth product of FC Pays d'Olmes, FC Mirepoix, FC Coussatois, FC Coussa Hers, and Toulouse. He began his senior career with the reserves of Toulouse in 2022. On 12 November 2022, he signed his first professional contract with Toulouse for three years. He made his professional debut with them in a 6–1 Ligue 1 loss to Marseille on 29 December 2022. He signed for Monégasque club AS Monaco on 11 August 2024.

== International career ==
Born in France, Mawissa is of Congolese descent. He is a youth international for France. He helped the France U17s win the 2022 UEFA European Under-17 Championship.

== Career statistics ==
As of match played 18 October 2026

Appearances and goals by club, season and competition
Club	Season	League			Cup		Europe		Other		Total	
Club	Season	Division	Apps	Goals	Apps	Goals	Apps	Goals	Apps	Goals	Apps	Goals
Toulouse II	2022–23	Championnat National 2	15	0	—		—		—		15	0
Toulouse II	2023–24	Championnat National 1	3	0	—		—		—		3	0
Toulouse II	Total		18	0	—		—		—		18	0
Toulouse	2022–23	Ligue 1	2	0	1	0	—		—		3	0
Toulouse	2023–24	Ligue 1	17	2	2	0	2 (Note: Appearances in UEFA Europa League)	0	1 (Note: Appearance in Trophée des Champions)	0	22	2
Toulouse	Total		19	2	3	0	2	0	1	0	25	2
AS Monaco	2024–25	Ligue 1	22	0	0	0	6 (Note: Appearances in UEFA Champions League)	0	—		28	0
AS Monaco	2025–26	Ligue 1	18	0	1	0	3	0	—		22	0
AS Monaco	2026–27	Ligue 1	1	0	0	0	2 (Note: Appearances in UEFA Conference League)	0	—		3	0
AS Monaco	Total		41	0	1	0	11	0	0	0	53	0
Career total			78	2	4	0	13	0	0	0	96	2

== Honours ==
Toulouse

- Coupe de France: 2022–23

France U17

- UEFA European Under-17 Championship: 2022
