= Ibrahim Cissoko =

Dutch footballer (born 2003)

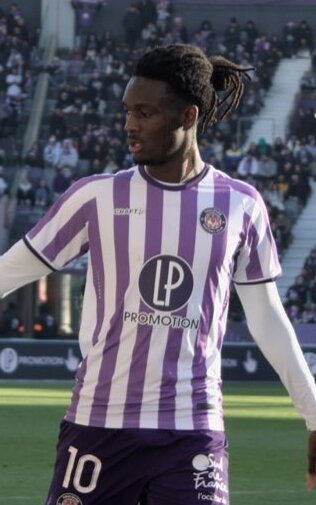
- Cissoko with Toulouse in 2023

Personal information
- Date of birth: 26 March 2003 (age 23)
- Place of birth: Nijmegen, Netherlands
- Height: 1.88 m (6 ft 2 in)
- Position: Left winger

Team information
- Current team: PEC Zwolle
- Number: 22

Youth career
- VVV-Venlo
- Vitesse
- 2016–2021: NEC

Senior career*
Years	Team	Apps	(Gls)
2021–2023	NEC	30	(3)
2023–2026	Toulouse	11	(1)
2024–2025	→ Plymouth Argyle (loan)	13	(3)
2025	→ Sheffield Wednesday (loan)	5	(0)
2025–2026	→ Bolton Wanderers (loan)	27	(3)
2026–	PEC Zwolle	0	(0)

International career
2024	Netherlands U21	3	(0)
- * Club domestic league appearances and goals as of 16 July 2026 (UTC)

Ibrahim Cissoko (born 26 March 2003) is a professional footballer who plays as a left winger for Eredivisie club PEC Zwolle. Born in the Netherlands, he has committed to play for the Guinea national team.

== Club career ==
=== NEC ===
Cissoko joined NEC in 2016, signing his first professional contract with the club in January 2021. He made his Eredivisie debut in a 1–0 defeat to Utrecht on 29 April 2022, and scored his first league goal on 8 May 2022 in a 1–0 victory over Go Ahead Eagles. Cissoko signed a new contract with NEC in July 2022, linking him to the club until the summer of 2024, with the option of an extra season. He scored his first league goal of the 2022–23 season in a 1–1 draw against Groningen, an 88th-minute equaliser.

=== Toulouse ===
In June 2023, Cissoko joined Ligue 1 club Toulouse. He sustained a foot injury in the summer, leaving him unable to make his competitive debut with Toulouse until 5 November 2023.

==== Plymouth Argyle (loan) ====
On 9 July 2024, Cissoko joined EFL Championship club Plymouth Argyle on a season-long loan deal.

==== Sheffield Wednesday (loan) ====
On 1 February 2025, Cissoko joined EFL Championship club Sheffield Wednesday on loan until the end of the season after his contracted was terminated with Plymouth. He made his debut coming off the bench against Swansea City in a 1–0 win.

==== Bolton Wanderers (loan) ====
On 13 August 2025, Cissoko joined League One club Bolton Wanderers on a season-long loan for the 2025–26 season. Three days later, on 16 August 2025, he made his Bolton debut in a 1–1 draw with Barnsley at Oakwell , replacing Joel Randall as a second-half substitute. He scored his first goal for the club in their FA Cup first-round defeat of Huddersfield Town on 1 November.

=== PEC Zwolle ===
On 21 July 2026, Cissoko returned to the Netherlands and signed a four-season deal with PEC Zwolle.

== International career ==
In December 2023, Cissoko was pre-called up by the Guinea national team for the 2023 Africa Cup of Nations. On 21 March 2024, he made his debut for Jong Oranje in a friendly match against Norway.

On 11 March 2026, Cissoko received approval from FIFA to switch his international allegiance to the Guinea national team.

== Style of play ==
Cissoko has been described as a quick winger who is capable of forming attacking partnerships with fellow forwards.

== Personal life ==
Born in the Netherlands, Cissoko is of Guinean descent.

== Career statistics ==
As of 20 December 2025

Appearances and goals by club, season and competition
Club	Season	League			National cup (Note: Includes KNVB Cup, Coupe de France, FA Cup)		League cup (Note: Includes EFL Cup)		Continental		Other		Total	
Club	Season	Division	Apps	Goals	Apps	Goals	Apps	Goals	Apps	Goals	Apps	Goals	Apps	Goals
NEC	2021–22	Eredivisie	4	1	0	0	0	0	—		—		4	1
NEC	2022–23	Eredivisie	26	2	2	0	0	0	—		—		28	2
NEC	Total		30	3	2	0	0	0	—		—		32	3
Toulouse	2023–24	Ligue 1	11	1	2	0	0	0	1 (Note: Appearance(s) in the UEFA Europa League)	0	1 (Note: Appearance in the Trophée des Champions)	0	15	1
Plymouth Argyle (loan)	2024–25	EFL Championship	13	3	0	0	2	0	—		—		15	3
Sheffield Wednesday (loan)	2024–25	EFL Championship	5	0	—		—		—		—		5	0
Bolton Wanderers (loan)	2025–26	EFL League One	14	0	1	1	—		—		3 (Note: Appearance(s) in the EFL Trophy)	2	18	3
Career total			72	7	5	1	2	0	1	0	4	2	85	10

== Honours ==
Bolton Wanderers

- EFL League One play-offs: 2026
