= Carles Martínez Novell =

Catalan (Spanish) football coach (born 1984)

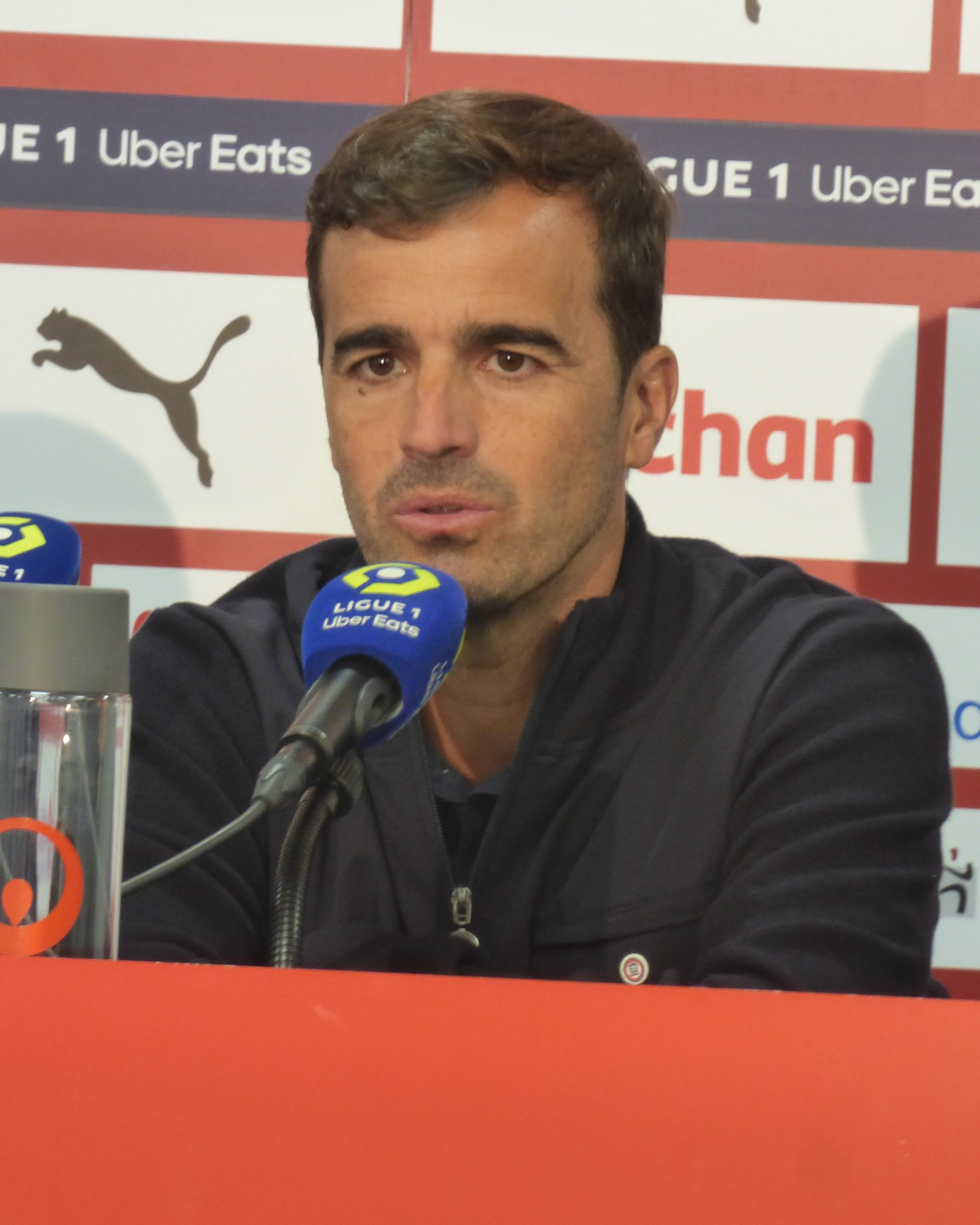
- Martínez Novell in 2023

Personal information
- Date of birth: 18 May 1984 (age 42)
- Place of birth: Les Franqueses del Vallès, Catalonia, Spain
- Position: Goalkeeper

Team information
- Current team: Bayer Leverkusen (head coach)

Youth career
- Years: Team
- Llerona
- 1998–2000: Granollers

Managerial career
- 2020–2022: Kuwait U20
- 2023–2026: Toulouse
- 2026–: Bayer Leverkusen

Carles Martínez Novell (born 18 May 1984) is a Spanish football manager and former player who is currently head coach of Bundesliga club Bayer Leverkusen.

== Managerial career ==
=== Early career ===
A youth product of his hometown club Llerona where he played as a goalkeeper, Martínez Novell moved to the youth academy of Granollers at the age of 14, and started managing their youth at the age of 16. He moved to Espanyol's youth sides shortly after. After five years with Espanyol, he moved to Barcelona in 2015 and helped manage youth teams in La Masia up to the U16 level. In 2019, he went to the Qatari club Al-Rayyan to manage their youth sides. He was appointed the manager of the Kuwait U20s in 2020.

=== Toulouse ===
On 9 December 2022, Martínez Novell was appointed as the assistant manager of Toulouse and head of methodology under Philippe Montanier. He was part of the management team that helped the club win the 2022–23 Coupe de France, and on 14 June 2023 he was named head coach.

Martínez Novell's debut in Ligue 1 came on 13 August 2023 in a 2–1 win away to Nantes, whom his club had also beaten in the cup final. On 3 January 2024, his team lost the Trophée des Champions 2–0 to Paris Saint-Germain; he said that his team lost the game in the first half by not believing in themselves. Eight days later, the club were eliminated in the last 32 of their cup defence, with a 12–11 penalty shootout defeat away to Championnat National side Rouen after a 3–3 draw, and he further criticised his players' efforts.

In the UEFA Europa League in 2023–24, Toulouse advanced from the group stage in second place behind Liverpool, with a home win and away defeat to the English side. In the playoff, they were eliminated by Portugal's Benfica in February; Martínez Novell called the goalless draw in the second leg at the Stadium de Toulouse their best performance of the season. The league campaign ended with the club in 11th place, signing off with a 3–0 home loss to UEFA Champions League qualifiers Brest.

In September 2024, Martínez Novell signed a new contract of undisclosed length. Club president Damien Comolli said that the coach was playing a style of football that the entity had sought for several years. In late April 2026, he announced that he would step down as head coach of the club at the end of the 2025–26 season.

=== Bayer Leverkusen ===
On 4 June 2026, Martínez Novell was appointed as head coach of Bayer Leverkusen, signing a two-year deal. He will start his job on 1 July 2026, replacing Kasper Hjulmand.

== Personal life ==
Martínez Novell has a degree from the University of Vic - Central University of Catalonia.

== Managerial statistics ==
As of 21 November 2026

Managerial record by team and tenure
Team	From	To	Record							
Team	From	To	G	W	D	L	GF	GA	GD	Win %
Toulouse	14 June 2023	3 May 2026	120	41	34	45	157	162	−5	34.17
Bayer Leverkusen	1 July 2026	present	16	11	1	4	41	20	+21	68.75
Total			136	52	35	49	198	182	+16	38.24
