= CONCACAF Awards =

Annual North American association football awards

- Current: 2024–25 CONCACAF Awards
- First award: 2013
- Website: www.concacaf.com

The CONCACAF Awards is an association football award given to honor players, match officials and coaches from the North American (CONCACAF) region. It was established in 2013 and was last awarded in 2022, before returning in 2023–24, this time under a seasonal format.

== Criteria ==
Players, coaches and referees of any nationality are eligible to be nominated, so long as they meet at least one of the following criteria:

1. Have played/coached/refereed in an official CONCACAF tournament at club or national level
2. Have played/coached/refereed for a CONCACAF member national team in a FIFA-sanctioned international competition
3. Have played/coached/refereed in a domestic league within CONCACAF's territory.

For each award, an initial shortlist of 20 nominees is established by CONCACAF's 41 Member Associations and CONCACAF competitions' Technical Study Groups.

The final shortlist is voted on by three groups; Member Associations' national team coaches and captains, media, and fans. Each group's votes provides a third of the total outcome.

== Male award winners ==
=== Player of the Year ===
Year	Rank	Player	Club
2013	1st	(Mexico) Oribe Peralta	(Mexico) Santos Laguna
2013	2nd	(United States) Landon Donovan	(United States) LA Galaxy
2013	3rd	(United States) Clint Dempsey	(United States) Seattle Sounders FC
2014	1st	(Costa Rica) Keylor Navas	(Spain) Real Madrid
2014	2nd	(Costa Rica) Bryan Ruiz	(England) Fulham
2014	3rd	(United States) Tim Howard	(England) Everton
2015	1st	(Mexico) Javier Hernández	(Germany) Bayer Leverkusen
2015	2nd	(Costa Rica) Bryan Ruiz	(Portugal) Sporting CP
2015	3rd	(Mexico) Andrés Guardado	(Netherlands) PSV Eindhoven
2016	1st	(Costa Rica) Bryan Ruiz	(Portugal) Sporting CP
2016	2nd	(Mexico) Hirving Lozano	(Mexico) Pachuca
2016	3rd	(Costa Rica) Keylor Navas	(Spain) Real Madrid
2017	1st	(Costa Rica) Keylor Navas	(Spain) Real Madrid
2017	2nd	(Mexico) Hirving Lozano	(Netherlands) PSV Eindhoven
2017	3rd	(Jamaica) Andre Blake	(United States) Philadelphia Union
2018	1st	(Mexico) Hirving Lozano	(Netherlands) PSV Eindhoven
2018	2nd	(Costa Rica) Keylor Navas	(Spain) Real Madrid
2018	3rd	(Italy) Sebastian Giovinco	(Canada) Toronto FC
2021	1st	(Canada) Alphonso Davies	(Germany) Bayern Munich
2022	1st	(Canada) Alphonso Davies	(Germany) Bayern Munich
2023–24	1st	(Panama) Adalberto Carrasquilla	(United States) Houston Dynamo FC
2024–25	1st	(Canada) Jonathan David	(France) Lille

=== Goalkeeper of the Year ===
Year	Rank	Player	Club
2013	1st	(United States) Tim Howard	(England) Everton
2013	2nd	(Mexico) Raúl Gudiño	(Mexico) Guadalajara
2013	3rd	(Costa Rica) Keylor Navas	(Spain) Levante
2014	1st	(United States) Tim Howard	(England) Everton
2014	2nd	(Mexico) Guillermo Ochoa	(Spain) Málaga
2014	3rd	(Costa Rica) Keylor Navas	(Spain) Real Madrid
2015	1st	(United States) Tim Howard	(England) Everton
2015	2nd	(Panama) Jaime Penedo	(Costa Rica) Saprissa
2015	3rd	(Mexico) Guillermo Ochoa	(Spain) Málaga
2016	1st	(Costa Rica) Keylor Navas	(Spain) Real Madrid
2016	2nd	(Mexico) Alfredo Talavera	(Mexico) Toluca
2016	3rd	(Argentina) Nahuel Guzmán	(Mexico) Tigres UANL
2017	1st	(Costa Rica) Keylor Navas	(Spain) Real Madrid
2017	2nd	(Jamaica) Andre Blake	(United States) Philadelphia Union
2017	3rd	(Panama) Jaime Penedo	(Romania) Dinamo București
2018	1st	(Costa Rica) Keylor Navas	(Spain) Real Madrid
2018	2nd	(Mexico) Guillermo Ochoa	(Belgium) Standard Liège
2018	3rd	(Puerto Rico) Cody Laurendi	(United States) Oklahoma City Energy

=== Coach of the Year ===
Year	Rank	Coach	Team(s)
2013	1st	(Germany) Jürgen Klinsmann	United States
2013	2nd	(Mexico) Miguel Herrera	América; Mexico
2013	3rd	(Colombia) Luis Fernando Suárez	Honduras
2014	1st	(Colombia) Jorge Luis Pinto	Costa Rica
2014	2nd	(Colombia) Luis Fernando Suárez	Honduras
2014	3rd	(Costa Rica) Oscar Ramírez	(Costa Rica) Alajuelense
2015	1st	(Colombia) Hernán Darío Gómez	Panama
2015	2nd	(United States) Caleb Porter	(United States) Portland Timbers
2015	3rd	(Mexico) Miguel Herrera	Mexico; Tijuana
2016	1st	(Costa Rica) Óscar Ramírez	Costa Rica
2016	2nd	(Brazil) Ricardo Ferretti	(Mexico) UANL
2016	3rd	(Uruguay) Diego Alonso	(Mexico) Pachuca
2017	1st	(United States) Greg Vanney	(Canada) Toronto FC
2017	2nd	(Colombia) Hernán Darío Gómez	Panama
2017	3rd	(Colombia) Juan Carlos Osorio	Mexico
2018	1st	(Argentina) Matías Almeyda	(Mexico) Guadalajara (United States) San Jose Earthquakes
2018	2nd	(Curaçao) Remko Bicentini	Curaçao
2018	3rd	(Colombia) Juan Carlos Osorio	Mexico; Paraguay

=== Referee of the Year ===
Year	Rank	Referee
2013	1st	(Mexico) Marco Rodríguez
2013	2nd	(Mexico) Roberto García
2013	3rd	(Jamaica) Courtney Campbell
2014	1st	(United States) Mark Geiger
2014	2nd	(Mexico) Marco Rodríguez
2014	3rd	(Costa Rica) Walter Quesada
2015	1st	(El Salvador) Joel Aguilar
2015	2nd	(Mexico) Roberto Garcia
2015	3rd	(Mexico) Fernando Guerrero
2016	1st	(Mexico) César Ramos
2016	2nd	(Canada) Joe Fletcher
2016	3rd	(El Salvador) Joel Aguilar
2017	1st	(Mexico) César Ramos
2017	2nd	(El Salvador) Joel Aguilar
2017	3rd	(Saint Kitts and Nevis) Kimbell Ward
2018	1st	(Mexico) César Ramos
2018	2nd	(United States) Mark Geiger
2018	3rd	(El Salvador) Joel Aguilar

== Female award winners ==
=== Player of the Year ===
Year	Rank	Player	Club
2013	1st	(United States) Alex Morgan	(United States) Portland Thorns
2013	2nd	(United States) Abby Wambach	(United States) Western New York Flash
2013	3rd	(Costa Rica) Shirley Cruz	(France) Paris Saint-Germain
2014	1st	(United States) Abby Wambach	(United States) Western New York Flash
2014	2nd	(Costa Rica) Shirley Cruz	(France) Paris Saint-Germain
2014	3rd	(Mexico) Charlyn Corral	(Finland) Merilappi United
2015	1st	(United States) Carli Lloyd	(United States) Houston Dash
2015	2nd	(United States) Alex Morgan	(United States) Orlando Pride
2015	3rd	(Costa Rica) Shirley Cruz	(France) Paris Saint-Germain
2016	1st	(United States) Alex Morgan	(United States) Orlando Pride
2016	2nd	(United States) Tobin Heath	(United States) Portland Thorns
2016	3rd	(United States) Crystal Dunn	(United States) Washington Spirit
2017	1st	(United States) Alex Morgan	(United States) Orlando Pride
2017	2nd	(Australia) Samantha Kerr	(United States) Sky Blue FC
2017	3rd	(Canada) Christine Sinclair	(United States) Portland Thorns
2018	1st	(United States) Alex Morgan	(United States) Orlando Pride
2018	2nd	(Jamaica) Khadija Shaw	(United States) Tennessee Volunteers
2018	3rd	(United States) Lindsey Horan	(United States) Portland Thorns
2021	1st	(United States) Crystal Dunn	(United States) Portland Thorns
2022	1st	(Jamaica) Khadija Shaw	(England) Manchester City
2023–24	1st	(Haiti) Melchie Dumornay	(France) Lyon
2024–25	1st	(Haiti) Melchie Dumornay	(France) Lyon

=== Goalkeeper of the Year ===
Year	Rank	Player	Club
2015	1st	(United States) Hope Solo	(United States) Seattle Reign
2015	2nd	(Costa Rica) Dinnia Díaz	(Costa Rica) Moravia
2015	3rd	(Mexico) Cecilia Santiago	(Cyprus) Apollon Limassol
2016	1st	(United States) Ashlyn Harris	(United States) Orlando Pride
2016	2nd	(Canada) Stephanie Labbé	(United States) Washington Spirit
2016	3rd	(Guatemala) Yoselin Franco	(Guatemala) Unifut
2017	1st	(United States) Adrianna Franch	(United States) Portland Thorns
2017	2nd	(United States) Ashlyn Harris	(United States) Orlando Pride
2017	3rd	(Mexico) Cecilia Santiago	(Mexico) América
2018	1st	(United States) Alyssa Naeher	(United States) Chicago Red Stars
2018	2nd	(Panama) Yenith Bailey	(Panama) San Miguelito
2018	3rd	(Canada) Stephanie Labbé	(Sweden) Linköping FC

=== Coach of the Year ===
Year	Rank	Coach	Team(s)
2015	1st	(United States) Jill Ellis	United States
2015	2nd	(Costa Rica) Amelia Valverde	Costa Rica
2015	3rd	(Panama) Raiza Gutierrez	Panama
2016	1st	(Costa Rica) Amelia Valverde	Costa Rica
2016	2nd	(United States) Jill Ellis	United States
2016	3rd	(United States) Michelle French	United States U20
2017	1st	(Mexico) Eva Espejo	(Mexico) Pachuca
2017	2nd	(Mexico) Roberto Medina	Mexico
2017	3rd	(Costa Rica) Amelia Valverde	Costa Rica
2018	1st	(Jamaica) Hue Menzies	(United States) Florida Kraze Krush; Jamaica
2018	2nd	(United States) Jill Ellis	United States
2018	3rd	(Mexico) Monica Vergara	Mexico U17

=== Referee of the Year ===
Year	Rank	Referee
2015	1st	(Costa Rica) Kimberly Moreira
2015	2nd	(Mexico) Lucila Venegas
2015	3rd	(Canada) Carol Anne Chénard
2016	1st	(Canada) Carol Anne Chenard
2016	2nd	(Mexico) Quetzalli Alvarado
2016	3rd	(Costa Rica) Kimberly Moreira
2017	1st	(Mexico) Lucila Venegas
2017	2nd	(Canada) Carol Anne Chénard
2017	3rd	(Costa Rica) Marianela Araya
2018	1st	(Mexico) Lucila Venegas
2018	2nd	(Trinidad and Tobago) Crystal Sobers
2018	3rd	(Canada) Carol Anne Chénard

== Mixed ==
=== Goal of the Year ===
Year	Rank	Player	Team	Opponent	Score	Competition
2013	1st	(Mexico) Raúl Jiménez	Mexico	Panama	2–1	2014 FIFA World Cup qualification
2013	2nd	(Honduras) Juan Carlos García	Honduras	United States	1–1	2014 FIFA World Cup qualification
2013	3rd	(United States) Jozy Altidore	United States	Honduras	1–0	2014 FIFA World Cup qualification
2014	1st	(Costa Rica) Bryan Ruiz	Costa Rica	Italy	1–0	2014 FIFA World Cup
2014	2nd	(Costa Rica) Esteban Ramírez	(Costa Rica) Herediano	(Costa Rica) Saprissa	3–1	2014–15 Liga FPD Invierno
2014	3rd	(Costa Rica) Joel Campbell	Costa Rica	Uruguay	1–1	2014 FIFA World Cup
2015	1st	(United States) Carli Lloyd	United States	Japan	4–0	2015 FIFA Women's World Cup
2015	2nd	(Mexico) Paul Aguilar	Mexico	United States	3–2	2015 CONCACAF Cup
2015	3rd	(Colombia) Darwin Quintero	(Mexico) América	(Nicaragua) Walter Ferretti	1–0	2015–16 CONCACAF Champions League
2016	1st	(Mexico) Jesús Corona	Mexico	Venezuela	1–1	Copa América Centenario
2016	2nd	(Mexico) Eduardo Herrera	(Mexico) Pumas UNAM	Honduras Progreso	1–0	2016–17 CONCACAF Champions League
2016	3rd	(El Salvador) Alexander Larín	(El Salvador) Alianza	(United States) New York Red Bulls	1–0	2016–17 CONCACAF Champions League
2017	1st	(Mexico) Amaury Escoto	(Mexico) Lobos BUAP	(Mexico) Guadalajara	2–1	Liga MX Apertura 2017
2017	2nd	(Brazil) Camila	(United States) Orlando Pride	(United States) Houston Dash	1–0	2017 National Women's Soccer League
2017	3rd	(Panama) Ernesto Sinclair	(Panama) Plaza Amador	(Panama) Árabe Unido	1–1	Liga Panameña de Fútbol 2017 Apertura
2018	1st	(United States) Joe Corona	(Mexico) América	(Panama) Tauro	1–0	2018 CONCACAF Champions League
2018	2nd	(Mexico) Alan Pulido	(Mexico) Guadalajara	(Canada) Toronto FC	2–1	2018 CONCACAF Champions League
2018	3rd	(Jamaica) Khadija Shaw	Jamaica	Cuba	1–0	2018 CONCACAF Women's Championship
2023–24	1st	(France) André-Pierre Gignac	(Mexico) Tigres UANL	(Canada) Vancouver Whitecaps FC	1–1	2024 CONCACAF Champions Cup
2024–25	1st	(Mexico) Raúl Jiménez	Mexico	Canada	2–0	2025 CONCACAF Nations League Finals

== See also ==
- List of sports awards honoring women
