= 2017 CONCACAF Awards =

2017 awards ceremony

CONCACAF Awards 2017
- Website: concacaf.com

The shortlists for the 2017 CONCACAF Awards were announced on 22 November 2017. The results were announced on 18 and 19 December 2017.

== Women's football awards ==
=== Player of the Year ===
Rank	Player name	Playing position	Team name
1	(United States) Alex Morgan	FW	(United States) Orlando Pride
2	(Australia) Sam Kerr	FW	(United States) Sky Blue FC
3	(Canada) Christine Sinclair	FW	(United States) Portland Thorns
	(United States) Becky Sauerbrunn	DF	(United States) FC Kansas City
	(United States) Carli Lloyd	MF	(United States) Houston Dash
	(Canada) Jessie Fleming	MF	(United States) UCLA Bruins
	(United States) Julie Ertz	MF	(United States) Chicago Red Stars
	(United States) Megan Rapinoe	FW	(United States) Seattle Reign FC
	(United States) Samantha Mewis	MF	(United States) North Carolina Courage
	(United States) Tobin Heath	MF	(United States) Portland Thorns

=== Goalkeeper of the Year ===
Rank	Player name	Team name
1	(United States) Adrianna Franch	(United States) Portland Thorns FC
2	(United States) Ashlyn Harris	(United States) Orlando Pride
3	(Mexico) Cecilia Santiago	(Mexico) América
	(United States) Alyssa Naeher	(United States) Chicago Red Stars
	(Costa Rica) Dinnia Diaz	(Costa Rica) Unión Deportiva Moravia
	(United States) Jane Campbell	(United States) Houston Dash
	(Canada) Kailen Sheridan	(United States) Sky Blue FC
	(United States) Nicole Barnhart	(United States) FC Kansas City
	(Canada) Sabrina D'Angelo	(United States) North Carolina Courage
	(Canada) Stephanie Labbé	(United States) Washington Spirit

=== Best XI ===
Shortlist
Defenders		Midfielders		Forwards	
Player name	Team name	Player name	Team name	Player name	Team name
(United States) Abby Dahlkemper	(United States) North Carolina Courage	(United States) Allie Long	(United States) Portland Thorns FC	(United States) Alex Morgan	(United States) Orlando Pride
(United States) Ali Krieger	(United States) Orlando Pride	(United States) Carli Lloyd	(United States) Houston Dash	(United States) Christen Press	(United States) Chicago Red Stars
(Canada) Allysha Chapman	(United States) Boston Breakers	(Canada) Desiree Scott	(United States) FC Kansas City	(Canada) Christine Sinclair	(United States) Portland Thorns FC
(United States) Becky Sauerbrunn	(United States) FC Kansas City	(Canada) Jessie Fleming	(United States) UCLA Bruins	(Costa Rica) Fernanda Barrantes	(Costa Rica) Deportivo Saprissa
(United States) Casey Short	(United States) Chicago Red Stars	(United States) Julie Ertz	(United States) Chicago Red Stars	(Canada) Janine Beckie	(United States) Houston Dash
(Costa Rica) Diana Saenz	(Costa Rica) Unión Deportiva Moravia	(Mexico) Karla Nieto	(Mexico) Pachuca	(Brazil) Marta	(United States) Orlando Pride
(United States) Emily Menges	(United States) Portland Thorns FC	(United States) Lindsey Horan	(United States) Portland Thorns FC	(Costa Rica) Karla Villalobos	(Costa Rica) Unión Deportiva Moravia
(United States) Kelley O'Hara	(United States) Sky Blue FC	(United States) Morgan Brian	(United States) Chicago Red Stars	(United States) Megan Rapinoe	(United States) Seattle Reign FC
(United States) Meghan Klingenberg	(United States) Portland Thorns FC	(United States) Sam Mewis	(United States) North Carolina Courage	(Australia) Sam Kerr	(United States) Sky Blue FC
(Canada) Quinn (Note: Then known as Rebecca Quinn)	(United States) Duke Blue Devils	(United States) Tobin Heath	(United States) Portland Thorns FC	(United States) Sydney Leroux	(United States) FC Kansas City

Final selection
Goalkeeper
- (United States) Adrianna Franch
Defenders
- (United States) Abby Dahlkemper
- (United States) Ali Krieger
- (United States) Becky Sauerbrunn
- (United States) Emily Menges
Midfielders
- (United States) Allie Long
- (United States) Carli Lloyd
- (Canada) Jessie Fleming
- (United States) Lindsey Horan
Forwards
- (United States) Alex Morgan
- (Brazil) Marta

=== Coach of the Year ===
Rank	Player name	Team name
1	(Mexico) Eva Espejo	(Mexico) Pachuca
2	(Mexico) Roberto Medina	Mexico
3	(Costa Rica) Amelia Valverde	Costa Rica
	(Costa Rica) Bernal Castillo	(Costa Rica) Unión Deportiva Moravia
	(England) Jill Ellis	United States
	(England) John Herdman	Canada
	(England) Laura Harvey	(United States) Seattle Reign FC
	(England) Mark Parsons	(United States) Portland Thorns FC
	(England) Paul Riley	(United States) North Carolina Courage
	(Scotland) Tom Sermanni	(United States) Orlando Pride

=== Referee of the Year ===
Rank	Referee name
1	(Mexico) Lucila Venegas
2	(Canada) Carol Anne Chenard
3	(Costa Rica) Marianela Araya Cruz
	(United States) Ekaterina Koroleva
	(Canada) Marie-Soleil Beaudoin
	(Guyana) Maurees Skeete
	(Honduras) Melissa Borjas
	(Canada) Michelle Pye
	(Jamaica) Odette Hamilton
	(Mexico) Quetzalli Alvarado

== Men's football awards ==
=== Player of the Year ===
Rank	Player name	Position	Team name
1	(Costa Rica) Keylor Navas	GK	(Spain) Real Madrid
2	(Mexico) Hirving Lozano	FW	(Netherlands) PSV Eindhoven
3	(Jamaica) Andre Blake	GK	(United States) Philadelphia Union
	(Costa Rica) Bryan Ruiz	MF	(Portugal) Sporting CP
	(United States) Christian Pulisic	MF	(Germany) Borussia Dortmund
	(United States) Clint Dempsey	FW	(United States) Seattle Sounders FC
	(Argentina) Franco Jara (Note: Argentine Franco Jara was eligible for the award as he played in the CONCACAF Champions League.)	FW	(Mexico) Pachuca
	(Mexico) Héctor Moreno	DF	(Italy) Roma
	(Mexico) Javier Hernández	FW	(England) West Ham United
	(United States) Jozy Altidore	FW	(Canada) Toronto FC

=== Goalkeeper of the Year ===
Rank	Player name	Team name
1	(Costa Rica) Keylor Navas	(Spain) Real Madrid
2	(Jamaica) Andre Blake	(United States) Philadelphia Union
3	(Panama) Jaime Penedo	(Romania) Dinamo București
	(Mexico) Alfonso Blanco	(Mexico) Pachuca
	(Honduras) Donis Escober	(Honduras) Olimpia
	(Curaçao) Eloy Room	(Netherlands) PSV Eindhoven
	(Mexico) Guillermo Ochoa	(Belgium) Standard Liège
	(Panama) Miguel Lloyd	(Panama) Árabe Unido
	(Argentina) Nahuel Guzmán	(Mexico) UANL
	(United States) Tim Howard	(United States) Colorado Rapids

=== Best XI ===
Shortlist
Defenders		Midfielders		Forwards	
Name	Club	Name	Club	Name	Club
(Costa Rica) Cristian Gamboa	(Scotland) Celtic	(Costa Rica) Bryan Ruiz	(Portugal) Sporting CP	(Honduras) Alberth Elis	(United States) Houston Dynamo
(Mexico) Diego Reyes	(Portugal) Porto	(Costa Rica) Celso Borges	(Spain) Deportivo La Coruña	(United States) Clint Dempsey	(United States) Seattle Sounders FC
(Panama) Felipe Baloy	(Guatemala) Municipal	(United States) Christian Pulisic	(Germany) Borussia Dortmund	(Spain) David Villa	(United States) New York City FC
(Mexico) Héctor Moreno	(Italy) Roma	(Costa Rica) David Guzmán	(United States) Portland Timbers	(Argentina) Franco Jara	(Mexico) Pachuca
(Trinidad and Tobago) Joevin Jones	(United States) Seattle Sounders FC	(Argentina) Diego Valeri	(United States) Portland Timbers	(Panama) Gabriel Torres	(Switzerland) Lausanne-Sport
(Jamaica) Kemar Lawrence	(United States) New York Red Bulls	(Mexico) Héctor Herrera	(Portugal) Porto	(Mexico) Hirving Lozano	(Netherlands) PSV Eindhoven
(Costa Rica) Kendall Waston	(Canada) Vancouver Whitecaps FC	(Mexico) Javier Aquino	(Mexico) UANL	(Mexico) Javier Hernández	(England) West Ham United
(Mexico) Miguel Layún	(Portugal) Porto	(Panama) José González	(Panama) Árabe Unido	(Mexico) Jesús Corona	(Portugal) Porto
(United States) Omar Gonzalez	(Mexico) Pachuca	(United States) Michael Bradley	(Canada) Toronto FC	(United States) Jozy Altidore	(Canada) Toronto FC
(Panama) Román Torres	(United States) Seattle Sounders FC	(Haiti) Wilde-Donald Guerrier	(Azerbaijan) Qarabağ	(Hungary) Nemanja Nikolić	(United States) Chicago Fire

Final selection
Goalkeeper
- (Costa Rica) Keylor Navas
Defenders
- (Costa Rica) Cristian Gamboa
- (Mexico) Héctor Moreno
- (Costa Rica) Kendall Waston
- (Panama) Román Torres
Midfielders
- (Costa Rica) Bryan Ruiz
- (United States) Christian Pulisic
- (Mexico) Héctor Herrera
- (Haiti) Wilde-Donald Guerrier
Forwards
- (Honduras) Alberth Elis
- (Mexico) Hirving Lozano

=== Coach of the Year ===
Rank	Coach name	Team name
1	(United States) Greg Vanney	(Canada) Toronto FC
2	(Colombia) Hernán Darío Gómez	Panama
3	(Colombia) Juan Carlos Osorio	Mexico
	(Uruguay) Diego Alonso	(Mexico) Pachuca
	(Argentina) Gerardo Martino	(United States) Atlanta United FC
	(Colombia) Jorge Luis Pinto	Honduras
	(Costa Rica) Óscar Ramirez	Costa Rica
	(Brazil) Ricardo Ferretti	(Mexico) UANL
	(Colombia) Sergio Guzmán	(Panama) Árabe Unido
	(Jamaica) Theodore Whitmore	Jamaica

=== Referee of the Year ===
Rank	Referee name
1	(Mexico) César Ramos
2	(El Salvador) Joel Aguilar
3	(Saint Kitts and Nevis) Kimbell Ward
	(Canada) Jair Marrufo
	(Panama) John Pitti
	(United States) Mark Geiger
	(Costa Rica) Ricardo Montero
	(Mexico) Roberto Garcia
	(Mexico) Luis Santander
	(Cuba) Yadel Martinez

== Mixed-sex ==
=== Goal of the Year ===
Rank	Player	Date	Match	Minute scored
1	(Mexico) Amaury Escoto	September 26	(Mexico) Guadalajara vs (Mexico) BUAP	85'
2	(Brazil) Camila	June 17	(United States) Houston Dash vs (United States) Orlando Pride	16'
3	(Panama) Ernesto Sinclair	August 20	(Panama) Árabe Unido vs (Panama) Plaza Amador	88'
	(France) André-Pierre Gignac	April 5	(Mexico) UANL vs (Canada) Vancouver Whitecaps FC	63'
	(Canada) Junior Hoilett	July 20	Jamaica vs Canada	61'
	(Spain) David Villa	April 14	(United States) Philadelphia Union vs (United States) New York City FC	90'
	(Uruguay) Jonathan Urretaviscaya	February 28	(Mexico) Pachuca vs (Costa Rica) Saprissa	31'
	(United States) Jozy Altidore	July 26	United States vs Jamaica	45'
	(Jamaica) Kemar Lawrence	July 23	Mexico vs Jamaica	88'
	(Australia) Sam Kerr	August 28	(United States) Sky Blue FC vs (United States) Orlando Pride	46'

=== Outstanding Performance Award ===
The Outstanding Performance Award was excluded from the Nomination and Voting Processes, and was selected by CONCACAF.

- Panama national football team and (Colombia) Hernán Darío Gómez
