= 2013 CONCACAF Awards =

CONCACAF Awards 2013
- Date: 13 December 2013
- Website: concacaf.com

The 2013 CONCACAF Awards were the first year for CONCACAF's awards for the top region football players, coaches and referees of the year. The results were announced on 13 December 2013.

== Award winners and shortlists ==
=== Player of the Year ===
Rank	Player name	Position	National team	Club team
1st	Oribe Peralta	Forward	Mexico	(Mexico) Santos Laguna
2nd	Landon Donovan	Forward	United States	(United States) LA Galaxy
3rd	Clint Dempsey	Midfielder	United States	(United States) Seattle Sounders FC
	Álvaro Saborío	Forward	Costa Rica	(United States) Real Salt Lake
	Bryan Ruiz	Forward	Costa Rica	(England) Fulham
	Jerry Bengtson	Forward	Honduras	(United States) New England Revolution
	Roger Espinoza	Midfielder	Honduras	(England) Wigan Athletic
	Michael Bradley	Midfielder	United States	(Italy) Roma
	Jozy Altidore	Forward	United States	(England) Sunderland
	Kenwyne Jones	Forward	Trinidad and Tobago	(England) Stoke City

=== Female Player of the Year ===
Rank	Player name	Position	National team	Club team
1st	Alex Morgan	Forward	United States	(United States) Portland Thorns
2nd	Abby Wambach	Forward	United States	(United States) Western New York Flash
3rd	Shirley Cruz	Midfielder	Costa Rica	(France) Paris Saint-Germain
	Christine Sinclair	Midfielder	Canada	(United States) Portland Thorns
	Hope Solo	Goalkeeper	United States	(United States) Seattle Reign
	Jessie Fleming	Midfielder	Canada (U17)	(Canada) London NorWest SC
	Sydney Leroux	Midfielder	United States	(United States) Seattle Reign
	Marie-Mychele Metivier	Forward	Canada (U17)	(Canada) Armada Chaudière-Est
	Christie Rampone	Defender	United States	(United States) Sky Blue FC
	Morgan Brian	Midfielder	United States	(United States) University of Virginia

=== Goalkeeper of the Year ===
Rank	Player name	National team	Club name
1st	Tim Howard	United States	(England) Everton
2nd	Raúl Gudiño	Mexico (U17)	(Mexico) Guadalajara
3rd	Keylor Navas	Costa Rica	(Spain) Levante
	Jaime Penedo	Panama	(United States) LA Galaxy
	Noel Valladares	Honduras	(Honduras) Olimpia
	Donovan Ricketts	Jamaica	(United States) Portland Timbers
	Guillermo Ochoa	Mexico	(France) Ajaccio
	Jesús Corona	Mexico	(Mexico) Cruz Azul
	Moisés Muñoz	Mexico	(Mexico) América
	Jan-Michael Williams	Trinidad and Tobago	(Trinidad and Tobago) Central FC

=== Coach of the Year ===
Rank	Coach	Club or national team
1st	(Germany) Jürgen Klinsmann	United States
2nd	(Mexico) Miguel Herrera	América & Mexico
3rd	(Colombia) Luis Fernando Suárez	Honduras
	(Colombia) Jorge Luis Pinto	Costa Rica
	(Panama) Julio Dely Valdés	Panama
	(Mexico) Víctor Manuel Vucetich	(Mexico) Monterrey
	(United States) Bruce Arena	(United States) LA Galaxy
	(Mexico) Raúl Gutiérrez	Mexico (U17)
	(Costa Rica) Oscar Ramírez	(Costa Rica) Alajuelense
	(Panama) Jorge Dely Valdés	Panama (U17)

=== Referee of the Year ===
Rank	Referee
1st	(Mexico) Marco Antonio Rodríguez
2nd	(Mexico) Roberto García
3rd	(Jamaica) Courtney Campbell
	(Costa Rica) Henry Bejarano
(Costa Rica) Wálter Quesada
(Guatemala) Walter López
(Panama) Roberto Moreno
(El Salvador) Joel Aguilar
(United States) Jair Marrufo
(United States) Mark Geiger

=== Goal of the Year ===
This award applies only to goals scored during CONCACAF official competitions.

Rank	Player	Date	Participants	Minute scored	Competition
1st	(Mexico) Raúl Jiménez	11 October 2013	Mexico vs Panama	85'	2014 FIFA World Cup qualification
2nd	(Honduras) Juan Carlos García	6 February 2013	Honduras vs United States	40'	2014 FIFA World Cup qualification
3rd	(United States) Jozy Altidore	18 June 2013	United States vs Honduras	73'	2014 FIFA World Cup qualification
	(Costa Rica) Bryan Ruiz	6 February 2013	Panama vs Costa Rica	84'	2014 FIFA World Cup qualification
	(Mexico) Aldo de Nigris	1 May 2013	(Mexico) CF Monterrey vs (Mexico) Santos Laguna	87'	2012–13 CONCACAF Champions League
	(Costa Rica) Celso Borges	18 June 2013	Costa Rica vs Panama	52'	2014 FIFA World Cup qualification
	(Martinique) Fabrice Reuperné	7 July 2013	Martinique vs Canada	90' +3	2013 CONCACAF Gold Cup
	(Mexico) Luis Montes	14 July 2013	Martinique vs Mexico	33'	2013 CONCACAF Gold Cup
	(United States) Brek Shea	28 July 2013	United States vs Panama	68'	2013 CONCACAF Gold Cup
	(Jamaica) Felicia Davidson	12 November 2013	Jamaica vs Mexico	45' +1	2013 CONCACAF Women's U-17 Championship
