= 2015 CONCACAF Awards =

CONCACAF Awards 2015
- Date: 22 January 2016
- Website: concacaf.com

The 2015 CONCACAF Awards is the third year for CONCACAF's awards for the top region football players, coaches and referees of the year. The shortlists were published on 12 January 2016. The results were announced on 22 January 2016.

The eligibility criteria for these awards is:

1. Have played/coached/refereed in an official CONCACAF tournament at club or national team level OR
2. Have played/coached/refereed for a CONCACAF member national team in a FIFA-sanctioned international competition OR
3. Have played/coached/refereed in a domestic league within CONCACAF territory (Note: A player/coach/referee from the CONCACAF region, who does not meet the above criteria (i.e. a player whose only performances in the past year came in a European or Asian league etc.), would not be eligible;)

== Female awards ==
=== Player of the Year ===
Rank	Name	Position	Club
1st	(United States) Carli Lloyd	MF	(United States) Houston Dash
2nd	(United States) Alex Morgan	FW	(United States) Orlando Pride
3rd	(Costa Rica) Shirley Cruz	MF	(France) Paris Saint-Germain
	(United States) Becky Sauerbrunn	DF	(United States) FC Kansas City
	(Canada) Christine Sinclair	FW	(United States) Portland Thorns FC
	(United States) Hope Solo	GK	(United States) Seattle Reign
	(United States) Julie Johnston	DF	(United States) Chicago Red Stars
	(Canada) Kadeisha Buchanan	DF	
	(United States) Megan Rapinoe	MF	(United States) Seattle Reign
	(Costa Rica) Raquel Rodríguez	FW	

=== Goalkeeper of the Year ===
Rank	Name	Team
1st	(United States) Hope Solo	(United States) Seattle Reign
2nd	(Costa Rica) Dinnia Díaz	(Costa Rica) Moravia
3rd	(Mexico) Cecilia Santiago	(Cyprus) Apollon Limassol
	(United States) Alyssa Naeher	(United States) Chicago Red Stars
	(United States) Ashlyn Harris	(United States) Orlando Pride
	(Canada) Erin McLeod	(United States) Houston Dash
	(Trinidad and Tobago) Kimika Forbes	Trinidad and Tobago
	(United States) Michele Dalton	(United States) Chicago Red Stars
	(United States) Rosemary Chandler	(United States) Concorde Fire
	(United States) Michelle Betos	(United States) Portland Thorns

=== Coach of the Year ===
Rank	Name	Club or National Team
1st	(England) Jill Ellis	United States
2nd	(Costa Rica) Amelia Valverde	Costa Rica
3rd	(Panama) Raiza Gutiérrez	Panama; Panama U-20
	(Antigua and Barbuda) Akeilah Hillhouse	(Antigua and Barbuda) Freeman’s Village FC
	(Antigua and Barbuda) Georgetta Lewis	(Antigua and Barbuda) Urlings
	(England) Laura Harvey	(United States) Seattle Reign
	(United States) Michelle French	United States

=== Referee of the Year ===
Rank	Name
1st	(Costa Rica) Kimberly Moreira
2nd	(Mexico) Lucila Venegas
3rd	(Canada) Carol Anne Chenard
	(United States) Karen Abt
(United States) Katja Koroleva
(United States) Margaret Domka
(Guyana) Maureese Skeete
(Honduras) Melissa Borjas
(Canada) Michelle Pye
(Mexico) Quetzalli Alvarado

=== Best XI ===
GK

- Hope Solo (GK/USA), Seattle Reign (USA)

DF

- Kenti Robles (DF/MEX), Atlético Madrid (ESP);
- Becky Sauerbrunn (DF/USA), FC Kansas City (USA);
- Lixy Rodriguez (DF/CRC), UCEM Alajuela (CRC);
- Diana Saenz (DF/CRC), University of South Florida (USA)

MF

- Carli Lloyd (MF/USA), Houston Dash (USA);
- Shirley Cruz (MF/CRC), Paris Saint-Germain (FRA);
- Katherine Alvarado (MF/CRC), Saprissa (CRC);
- Verónica Pérez (MF/MEX), Canberra United (AUS)

FW

- Alex Morgan (FW/USA), Orlando Pride (USA);
- Raquel Rodríguez (FW/CRC), Penn State University (USA)

== Male awards ==
=== Player of the Year ===
Rank	Name	Position	Club
1st	(Mexico) Javier Hernández	FW	(Germany) Bayer Leverkusen
2nd	(Costa Rica) Bryan Ruiz	FW	(Portugal) Sporting CP
3rd	(Mexico) Andrés Guardado	MF	(Netherlands) PSV Eindhoven
	(United States) Clint Dempsey	FW	(United States) Seattle Sounders FC
	(Canada) Cyle Larin	FW	(United States) Orlando City SC
	(Mexico) Hirving Lozano	FW	(Mexico) Pachuca
	(Mexico) Jesús Corona	MF	(Portugal) Porto
	(United States) Michael Bradley	MF	(Canada) Toronto FC
	(Mexico) Oribe Peralta	FW	(Mexico) América
	(Jamaica) Rodolph Austin	MF	(Denmark) Brøndby

=== Goalkeeper of the Year ===
Rank	Name	Team
1st	(United States) Tim Howard	(England) Everton
2nd	(Panama) Jaime Penedo	(United States) LA Galaxy
3rd	(Mexico) Guillermo Ochoa	(Spain) Málaga
	(Jamaica) Andre Blake	(United States) Philadelphia Union
	(United States) Bill Hamid	(United States) D.C. United
	(United States) Brad Guzan	(England) Aston Villa
	(Jamaica) Dwayne Miller	(Sweden) Syrianska
	(Costa Rica) Esteban Alvarado	(Turkey) Trabzonspor
	(United States) Evan Bush	(Canada) Montreal Impact
	(Mexico) Moisés Muñoz	(Mexico) América

=== Coach of the Year ===
Rank	Name	Team
1st	(Colombia) Hernán Darío Gómez	Panama
2nd	(United States) Caleb Porter	(United States) Portland Timbers
3rd	(Mexico) Miguel Herrera	(Mexico) Tijuana
	(Uruguay) Gustavo Matosas	(Mexico) América
	(United States) Jesse Marsch	(United States) New York Red Bulls
	(Germany) Jürgen Klinsmann	United States
	(France) Marc Collat	Haiti
	(Mexico) Raúl Gutiérrez	Mexico U-23
	(Trinidad and Tobago) Stephen Hart	Trinidad and Tobago
	(Germany) Winfried Schäfer	Jamaica

=== Referee of the Year ===
Rank	Name
1st	(El Salvador) Joel Aguilar
2nd	(Mexico) Roberto García
3rd	(Mexico) Fernando Guerrero
	(Canada) David Gantar
(Honduras) Héctor Francisco Rodríguez
(Costa Rica) Henry Bejarano
(Costa Rica) Ricardo Montero
(Guyana) Sherwin Moore
(Guatemala) Walter López
(Cuba) Yadel Martínez

=== Best XI ===
GK

- Tim Howard (GK/USA); Everton (ENG)

DF

- Román Torres (DF/PAN), Seattle Sounders (USA)
- Giancarlo González (DF/CRC), Palermo (ITA)
- Héctor Moreno (DF/MEX), PSV (NED)
- Miguel Layún (DF/MEX), Porto (POR)

MF

- Andrés Guardado (MF/MEX), PSV (NED);
- Michael Bradley (MF/USA), Toronto FC (CAN)
- Joel Campbell (MF/CRC), Arsenal (ENG)
- Jesús Corona (MF/MEX), Porto (POR)

FW

- Javier Hernández (FW/MEX), Bayer Leverkusen (GER)
- Bryan Ruiz (FW/CRC), Sporting CP (POR)

== Mixed-sex ==
=== Goal of the Year ===
Goal of the Year applies only to goals scored during CONCACAF or FIFA official competitions or a league game disputed within the CONCACAF region;

Rank	Player	Date	Participants	Minute scored	Competition
1st	(United States) Carli Lloyd	July 5, 2015	USA vs. Japan	16'	2015 FIFA Women's World Cup
2nd	(Mexico) Paul Aguilar	October 10, 2015	Mexico vs. USA	122'	2015 CONCACAF Cup
3rd	(Colombia) Darwin Quintero	August 19, 2015	Club America vs. Walter Ferretti	13'	2014–15 CONCACAF Champions League
	(Mexico) Andrés Guardado	July 26, 2015	Jamaica vs. Mexico	31'	2015 CONCACAF Gold Cup
	(Guatemala) Carlos Ruiz	July 9, 2015	Trinidad & Tobago vs. Guatemala	62'	2015 CONCACAF Gold Cup
	(Costa Rica) Karla Villalobos	June 13, 2015	South Korea vs. Costa Rica	88'	2015 FIFA Women's World Cup
	(United States) Lauren Holiday	July 5, 2015	USA vs. Japan	14'	2015 FIFA Women's World Cup
	(Mexico) Javier Hernández	October 10, 2015	Mexico vs. USA	10'	2015 CONCACAF Cup
	(Cuba) Arichel Hernández	October 6, 2015	Canada vs. Cuba	87'	2015 CONCACAF Men's Olympic Qualifying Championship
	(Mexico) Víctor Guzmán	October 14, 2015	Honduras vs. Mexico	68'	2015 CONCACAF Men's Olympic Qualifying Championship
