= 2014 CONCACAF Awards =

CONCACAF Awards 2014
- Date: 23 January 2015
- Website: concacaf.com

The 2014 CONCACAF Awards were the second year for CONCACAF's awards for the top region football players, coaches and referees of the year. The shortlists were published on 11 December 2014. The results were announced on 23 December 2014.

== Award winners and shortlists ==
=== Player of the Year ===
Rank	Name	Position	National Team	Club
1st	Keylor Navas	Goalkeeper	Costa Rica	(Spain) Real Madrid
2nd	Bryan Ruiz	Forward	Costa Rica	(England) Fulham
3rd	Tim Howard	Goalkeeper	United States	(England) Everton
	Celso Borges	Midfielder	Costa Rica	(Sweden) AIK
	Clint Dempsey	Forward	United States	(United States) Seattle Sounders FC
	Giovani dos Santos	Forward	Mexico	(Spain) Villarreal
	Guillermo Ochoa	Goalkeeper	Mexico	(Spain) Málaga
	Javier Hernández	Forward	Mexico	(Spain) Real Madrid
	Joel Campbell	Forward	Costa Rica	(England) Arsenal
	Rafael Márquez	Defender	Mexico	(Italy) Hellas Verona

=== Female Player of the Year ===
Rank	Name	Position	National Team	Club
1st	Abby Wambach	Forward	United States	(United States) Western New York Flash
2nd	Shirley Cruz	Midfielder	Costa Rica	(France) Paris Saint-Germain Féminines
3rd	Charlyn Corral	Forward	Mexico	(Finland) Merilappi United
	Alex Morgan	Forward	United States	(United States) Portland Thorns FC
	Carli Lloyd	Midfielder	United States	(United States) Western New York Flash
	Christine Sinclair	Forward	Canada	(United States) Portland Thorns
	Hope Solo	Goalkeeper	United States	(United States) Seattle Reign FC
	Kennya Cordner	Forward	Trinidad and Tobago	(United States) Seattle Sounders Women
	Lauren Holiday	Midfielder	United States	(United States) FC Kansas City
	Raquel Rodriguez Cedeño	Forward	Costa Rica	(United States) Penn State Nittany Lions

=== Goalkeeper of the Year ===
Rank	Name	National Team	Club
1st	Tim Howard	United States	(England) Everton
2nd	Guillermo Ochoa	Mexico	(Spain) Málaga
3rd	Keylor Navas	Costa Rica	(Spain) Real Madrid
	Alfredo Talavera	Mexico	(Mexico) Toluca
	Andre Blake	Jamaica	(United States) Philadelphia Union
	Jaime Penedo	Panama	(United States) LA Galaxy
	Jan-Michael Williams	Trinidad and Tobago	(Trinidad and Tobago) Central FC
	Jesús Corona	Mexico	(Mexico) Cruz Azul
	Nick Rimando	United States	(United States) Real Salt Lake
	Patrick Pemberton	Costa Rica	(Costa Rica) Alajuelense

=== Coach of the Year ===
Rank	Name	Club	National Team
1st	Jorge Luis Pinto		Costa Rica
2nd	Luis Fernando Suarez		Honduras
3rd	Oscar Ramírez	(Costa Rica) Alajuelense	
	Bruce Arena	(United States) LA Galaxy	
	Garabet Avedissian		Costa Rica (♀) and Costa Rica (♀ U20)
	Jill Ellis		United States (♀)
	Jorge Dely Valdés	(Panama) Tauro	
	Jürgen Klinsmann		United States
	Miguel Herrera		Mexico
	Stephen Hart		Trinidad and Tobago

=== Referee of the Year ===
Rank	Name
1st	(United States) Mark Geiger
2nd	(Mexico) Marco Antonio Rodriguez
3rd	(Costa Rica) Henry Bejarano
	(Jamaica) Dwight Royal
(El Salvador) Joel Aguilar
(Mexico) Roberto García
(Panama) Roberto Moreno
(Guatemala) Walter López
(Costa Rica) Walter Quesada
(The Bahamas) Wilson Da Costa

=== Goal of the Year ===
This award applies only to goals scored during CONCACAF official competitions.

Rank	Player	Date	Participants	Minute scored	Competition
1st	Bryan Ruiz	20 June 2014	Costa Rica vs. Italy	44'	2014 FIFA World Cup
2nd	Esteban Ramírez	2 November 2014	(Costa Rica) Herediano vs. (Costa Rica) Saprissa	20'	2014–15 Costa Rican FPD season
3rd	Joel Campbell	14 June 2014	Costa Rica vs. Uruguay	54'	2014 FIFA World Cup
	Carolina Venegas	21 October 2014	Martinique vs. Costa Rica	81'	2014 CONCACAF Women's Championship
	Elías Aguilar	21 August 2014	(Costa Rica) Herediano vs. (El Salvador) Isidro Metapán	42'	2014–15 CONCACAF Champions League
	Giovani dos Santos	29 June 2014	Netherlands vs. Mexico	48'	2014 FIFA World Cup
	Jermaine Jones	22 June 2014	United States vs. Portugal	64'	2014 FIFA World Cup
	Marco Fabián	15 February 2014	(Mexico) Cruz Azul vs. (Mexico) Puebla	92'	2013–14 Liga MX season
	Meghan Klingenberg	20 October 2014	United States vs. Haiti	57'	2014 CONCACAF Women's Championship
	Yendrick Ruiz	21 August 2014	(Costa Rica) Herediano vs. (El Salvador) Isidro Metapán	33'	2014–15 CONCACAF Champions League
