= 2016 CONCACAF Awards =

CONCACAF Awards 2016
- Date: 18 January 2017
- Website: concacaf.com

The shortlists were announced on 15 December 2016. The results were announced on 18 January 2017.

== Eligibility criteria ==
Players, coaches and referees of any nationality were eligible to be nominated for the awards, as long as they meet at least one of the following criteria:

- Have played/coached/refereed in an official CONCACAF tournament at club or national team level
- Have played/coached/refereed for a CONCACAF member national team in a FIFA-sanctioned international competition
- Have played/coached/refereed in a domestic league within CONCACAF's territory

== Female awards ==
=== Player of the Year ===
Rank	Player	Position	Club
1	Alex Morgan (USA)	FW	(United States) Orlando Pride
2	Tobin Heath (USA)	MF	(United States) Portland Thorns FC
3	Crystal Dunn (USA)	FW	(United States) Washington Spirit
	Becky Sauerbrunn (USA)	DF	(United States) FC Kansas City
	Carli Lloyd (USA)	MF/FW	(United States) Houston Dash
	Christine Sinclair (CAN)	FW	(United States) Portland Thorns FC
	Janine Beckie (CAN)	FW	(United States) Houston Dash
	Karla Villalobos (CRC)	FW	(Costa Rica) Unión Deportiva Moravia
	Mallory Pugh (USA)	FW	(United States) Real Colorado
	Shirley Cruz (CRC)	MF	(France) Paris Saint-Germain

=== Goalkeeper of the Year ===
Rank	Player	Club
1	Ashlyn Harris (USA)	(United States) Orlando Pride
2	Stephanie Labbé (CAN)	(United States) Washington Spirit
3	Yoselin Franco (GUA)	(Guatemala) Unifut
	Alyssa Naeher (USA)	(United States) Chicago Red Stars
	Cecilia Santiago (MEX)	(Iceland) Þór Akureyri
	Dinnia Diaz (CRC)	(Costa Rica) Unión Deportiva Moravia
	Erin McLeod (CAN)	(Sweden) FC Rosengård
	Kimika Forbes (TRI)	(Paraguay) Club Sportivo Limpeño Ladies
	Michelle Betos (USA)	(United States) Portland Thorns FC
	Sabrina D'Angelo (CAN)	(United States) Western New York Flash

=== Coach of the Year ===
Rank	Coach	Club	National team
1	Amelia Valverde (CRC)		Costa Rica
2	Jill Ellis (USA)		United States
3	Michelle French (USA)		United States U20
	Laura Harvey (ENG)	(United States) Seattle Reign	

=== Referee of the Year ===
Rank	Referee	National Association
1	Carol Anne Chenard	Canada
2	Quetzalli Alvarado	Mexico
3	Kimberly Moreira	Costa Rica (Assistant Referee)
	Katja Koroleva	United States
	Marie-Soleil Beaudoin	Canada
	Maurees Skeete	Guyana
	Melissa Borjas	Honduras
	Mirian Leon	El Salvador
	Princess Brown	Jamaica (Assistant Referee)
	Shirley Perello	Honduras (Assistant Referee)

=== Best XI ===
Shortlist
Defenders		Midfielders		Forwards	
Player	Club	Player	Club	Player	Club
Ali Krieger (USA)	(United States) Washington Spirit	Desiree Scott (CAN)	(United States) FC Kansas City	Alex Morgan (USA)	(United States) Orlando Pride
Alina Garciamendez (MEX)		Diana Matheson (CAN)	(United States) Washington Spirit	Christen Press (USA)	(United States) Chicago Red Stars
Ashley Lawrence (CAN)	(United States) West Virginia University	Carli Lloyd (USA)	(United States) Houston Dash	Christine Sinclair (CAN)	(Canada) Portland Thorns
Allysha Chapman (CAN)	(United States) Houston Dash; (United States) Boston Breakers	Gloriana Villalobos (CRC)	(Costa Rica) Deportivo Saprissa	Crystal Dunn (USA)	(United States) Washington Spirit
Becky Sauerbrunn (USA)	(United States) FC Kansas City	Jessie Fleming (CAN)	(United States) UCLA	Deanne Rose (CAN)	(Canada) Scarborough GS United
Julie Johnston (USA)	(United States) Chicago Red Stars	Megan Rapinoe (USA)	(United States) Seattle Reign FC	Janine Beckie (CAN)	(United States) Houston Dash
Kadeisha Buchanan (CAN)	(United States) West Virginia University	Morgan Brian (USA)	(United States) Houston Dash	Karla Villalobos (CRC)	(Costa Rica) Unión Deportiva Moravia
Kelley O'Hara (USA)	(United States) Sky Blue FC	Shirley Cruz (CRC)	(France) Paris Saint-Germain	Mallory Pugh (USA)	(United States) Real Colorado
Meghan Klingenberg (USA)	(United States) Portland Thorns FC	Sophie Schmidt (CAN)	(Germany) FFC Frankfurt	Melissa Tancredi (CAN)	(Sweden) KIF Örebro DFF
Shelina Zadorsky (CAN)	(United States) Washington Spirit	Tobin Heath (USA)	(United States) Portland Thorns FC	Raquel Rodríguez Cedeño (CRC)	(United States) Sky Blue FC

Final selection
Goalkeeper
- Ashlyn Harris
Defenders
- Ali Krieger
- Kadeisha Buchanan
- Becky Sauerbrunn
- Ashley Lawrence
Midfielders
- Gloriana Villalobos
- Carli Lloyd
- Shirley Cruz
- Tobin Heath
Forwards
- Alex Morgan
- Christine Sinclair

== Male awards ==
=== Player of the Year ===
Rank	Player	Position	Club
1	Bryan Ruiz (CRC)	MF/FW	(Portugal) Sporting CP
2	Hirving Lozano (MEX)	FW/MF	(Mexico) Pachuca
3	Keylor Navas (CRC)	GK	(Spain) Real Madrid
	Christian Bolaños (CRC)	MF	(Canada) Vancouver Whitecaps FC
	Christian Pulisic (USA)	MF	(Germany) Borussia Dortmund
	Clint Dempsey (USA)	FW/MF	(United States) Seattle Sounders FC
	Javier Hernández (MEX)	FW	(Germany) Bayer Leverkusen
	Romell Quioto (HON)	MF/FW	(Honduras) Olimpia
	Rubens Sambueza (MEX)	MF	(Mexico) América
	Wes Morgan (JAM)	DF	(England) Leicester City

=== Goalkeeper of the Year ===
Rank	Player	Club
1	Keylor Navas (CRC)	(Spain) Real Madrid
2	Alfredo Talavera (MEX)	(Mexico) Toluca
3	Nahuel Guzmán (ARG)	(Mexico) UANL
	Brad Guzan (USA)	(England) Middlesbrough
	Guillermo Ochoa (MEX)	(Spain) Granada
	Jaime Penedo (PAN)	(Romania) Dinamo București
	Luis López (HON)	(Honduras) Real España
	Miguel Lloyd (DOM)	(Panama) Árabe Unido
	Milan Borjan (CAN)	(Bulgaria) Ludogorets Razgrad
	Tim Howard (USA)	(United States) Colorado Rapids

=== Coach of the Year ===
Rank	Coach	Club	National team
1	Óscar Ramírez (CRC)		Costa Rica
2	Ricardo Ferretti (BRA)	(Mexico) UANL	
3	Diego Alonso (URU)	(Mexico) Pachuca	
	Bruce Arena (USA)	(United States) LA Galaxy	
	Hernán Darío Gómez (COL)		Panama
	Jorge Luis Pinto (COL)		Honduras
	Juan Carlos Osorio (COL)		Mexico
	Miguel Herrera (MEX)	(Mexico) Tijuana	
	Óscar Pareja (COL)	(United States) FC Dallas	
	Sergio Guzmán (PAN)	(Panama) Árabe Unido	

=== Referee of the Year ===
Rank	Referee	National Association
1	César Ramos	Mexico
2	Joe Fletcher	Canada (Assistant Referee)
3	Joel Aguilar	El Salvador
	John Pitti	Panama
	José Luis Camargo	Mexico (Assistant Referee)
	Leonel Leal	Costa Rica (Assistant Referee)
	Mark Geiger	United States
	Ricardo Montero	Costa Rica
	Roberto García	Mexico
	Walter López	Guatemala

=== Best XI ===
Shortlist
Defenders		Midfielders		Forwards	
Player	Club	Player	Club	Player	Club
Adam Straith (CAN)	(Norway) Fredrikstad	Andrés Guardado (MEX)	(Netherlands) PSV Eindhoven	André-Pierre Gignac (FRA)	(Mexico) UANL
Cristian Gamboa (CRC)	(Scotland) Celtic	Atiba Hutchinson (CAN)	(Turkey) Beşiktaş	Bobby Wood (USA)	(Germany) Hamburger SV
Felipe Baloy (PAN)	(Panama) Rionegro Águilas	Christian Bolaños (CRC)	(Canada) Vancouver Whitecaps FC	Bradley Wright-Phillips (ENG)	(United States) New York Red Bulls
Héctor Moreno (MEX)	(Netherlands) PSV Eindhoven	Christian Pulisic (USA)	(Germany) Borussia Dortmund	Bryan Ruiz (CRC)	(Portugal) Sporting CP
John Brooks (USA)	(Germany) Hertha BSC	Giovani dos Santos (MEX)	(United States) LA Galaxy	Clint Dempsey (USA)	(United States) Seattle Sounders FC
Maynor Figueroa (HON)	(United States) FC Dallas	Héctor Herrera (MEX)	(Portugal) Porto	Gino van Kessel (CUW)	(Czech Republic) Slavia Prague
Miguel Layún (MEX)	(Portugal) Porto	Hirving Lozano (MEX)	(Mexico) Pachuca	Javier Hernández (MEX)	(Germany) Bayer Leverkusen
Rafael Márquez (MEX)	(Mexico) Atlas	Jesús Corona (MEX)	(Portugal) Porto	Jozy Altidore (USA)	(Canada) Toronto FC
Rónald Matarrita (CRC)	(United States) New York City FC	Nicolás Lodeiro (URU)	(United States) Seattle Sounders FC	Oribe Peralta (MEX)	(Mexico) América
Wes Morgan (JAM)	(England) Leicester City	Rubens Sambueza (ARG)	(Mexico) América	Romell Quioto (HON)	(Honduras) Olimpia

Final selection
Goalkeeper
- Keylor Navas
Defenders
- Rónald Matarrita
- Wes Morgan
- Rafael Márquez
- Miguel Layún
Midfielders
- Christian Bolaños
- Atiba Hutchinson
- Andrés Guardado
- Hirving Lozano
Forwards
- André-Pierre Gignac
- Bryan Ruiz

== Mixed-sex ==
=== Outstanding Performance Award ===
- Canada women's national soccer team and (England) John Herdman

=== Goal of the Year ===
Goal of the Year applies only to goals scored during CONCACAF or FIFA official competitions or a league game disputed within the CONCACAF region.

Rank	Player	Date	Participants	Minute scored	Competition
1	Jesús Corona (MEX)	June 14, 2016	Mexico v Venezuela	80'	Copa América Centenario
2	Eduardo Herrera (MEX)	August 19, 2016	UNAM (Mexico) v Honduras Progreso	66'	2016–17 CONCACAF Champions League
3	Alexander Larín (SLV)	August 17, 2016	Alianza (El Salvador) v (United States) New York Red Bulls	54'	2016–17 CONCACAF Champions League
	Amílcar Henríquez (PAN)	August 25, 2016	Don Bosco (Haiti) v (Panama) Árabe Unido	24'	2016–17 CONCACAF Champions League
	Carlos Lizarazo (COL)	October 21, 2016	Suchitepéquez (Guatemala) v (United States) FC Dallas	22'	2016–17 CONCACAF Champions League
	Christine Sinclair (CAN)	February 19, 2016	Canada v Costa Rica	52'	2016 CONCACAF Women's Olympic Qualifying Championship
	Clint Dempsey (USA)	June 16, 2016	United States v Ecuador	20'	Copa América Centenario
	Joel Campbell (CRC)	November 16, 2016	Costa Rica v United States	74'	2018 FIFA World Cup qualification (CONCACAF)
	Kelley O'Hara (USA)	September 15, 2016	United States v Puerto Rico	45'	2016 CONCACAF Women's Olympic Qualifying Championship
	Romell Quioto (HON)	September 2, 2016	Honduras v Canada	51'	2018 FIFA World Cup qualification (CONCACAF)
