= Román Torres =

Panamanian footballer (born 1986)

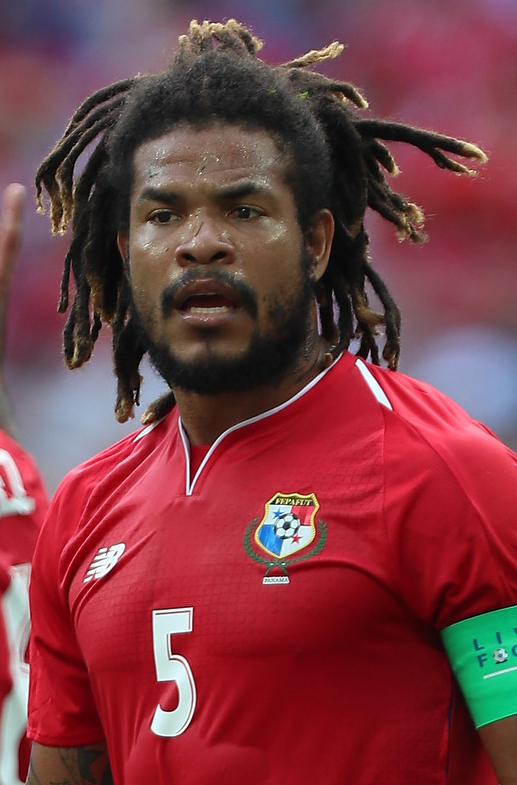
- Torres with Panama at the 2018 FIFA World Cup

Personal information
- Full name: Román Aureliano Torres Morcillo
- Date of birth: 20 March 1986 (age 40)
- Place of birth: Panama City, Panama
- Height: 1.88 m (6 ft 2 in)
- Position: Centre back

Team information
- Current team: Tacoma Stars

Youth career
- Chepo

Senior career*
Years	Team	Apps	(Gls)
2004	Chepo	27	(5)
2005	San Francisco	33	(4)
2006	Cortuluá	39	(6)
2007–2015	La Equidad	84	(9)
2010	→ Atlético Junior (loan)	35	(7)
2011	→ Atlético Nacional (loan)	36	(8)
2012–2015	→ Millonarios (loan)	89	(5)
2015–2019	Seattle Sounders FC	66	(1)
2019	→ Tacoma Defiance (loan)	1	(0)
2020	Inter Miami CF	5	(0)
2020	Seattle Sounders FC	3	(0)
2021	Cartaginés	16	(1)
2021	Universitario	13	(2)
2023	Dallas Sidekicks (indoor)	7	(2)
2023–	Tacoma Stars (indoor)	13	(3)
Total		467	(53)

International career^{‡}
2005–2019	Panama	120	(10)
- * Club domestic league appearances and goals as of 27 November 2024 ‡ National team caps and goals as of 8 July 2022

Román Aureliano Torres Morcillo (Spanish pronunciation: [roˈman ˈtores]; born 20 March 1986) is a Panamanian professional footballer who plays as a defender for Tacoma Stars.

He played for the Panama national team and captained them in their first ever World Cup, where he was regarded as the 'star player' for the national side.

== Club career ==
Torres started his career at Chepo and played alongside compatriot Anthony Basile at Colombian side Cortuluá from January 2006. In January 2007 he moved to La Equidad, where he was joined by compatriot Orlando Rodríguez.

His performances gained him notice with several clubs, particularly with English Championship sides Blackpool and Swansea City during the winter transfer market in 2010. However, a move to England never materialised. He was also on trial for the Championship team Nottingham Forest in December 2011–January 2012, impressing manager, Steve Cotterill. However, this move also failed to materialize.

=== Millonarios FC ===
More recently, his continued good form at Millonarios FC caused Roman to be linked with a move to Brazilian side Palmeiras, though this too failed to materialize.

He was a champion of the Colombian national football tournament Liga Postobón II 2012 with Millonarios FC, for whom he played over 100 matches.

=== Seattle Sounders FC ===
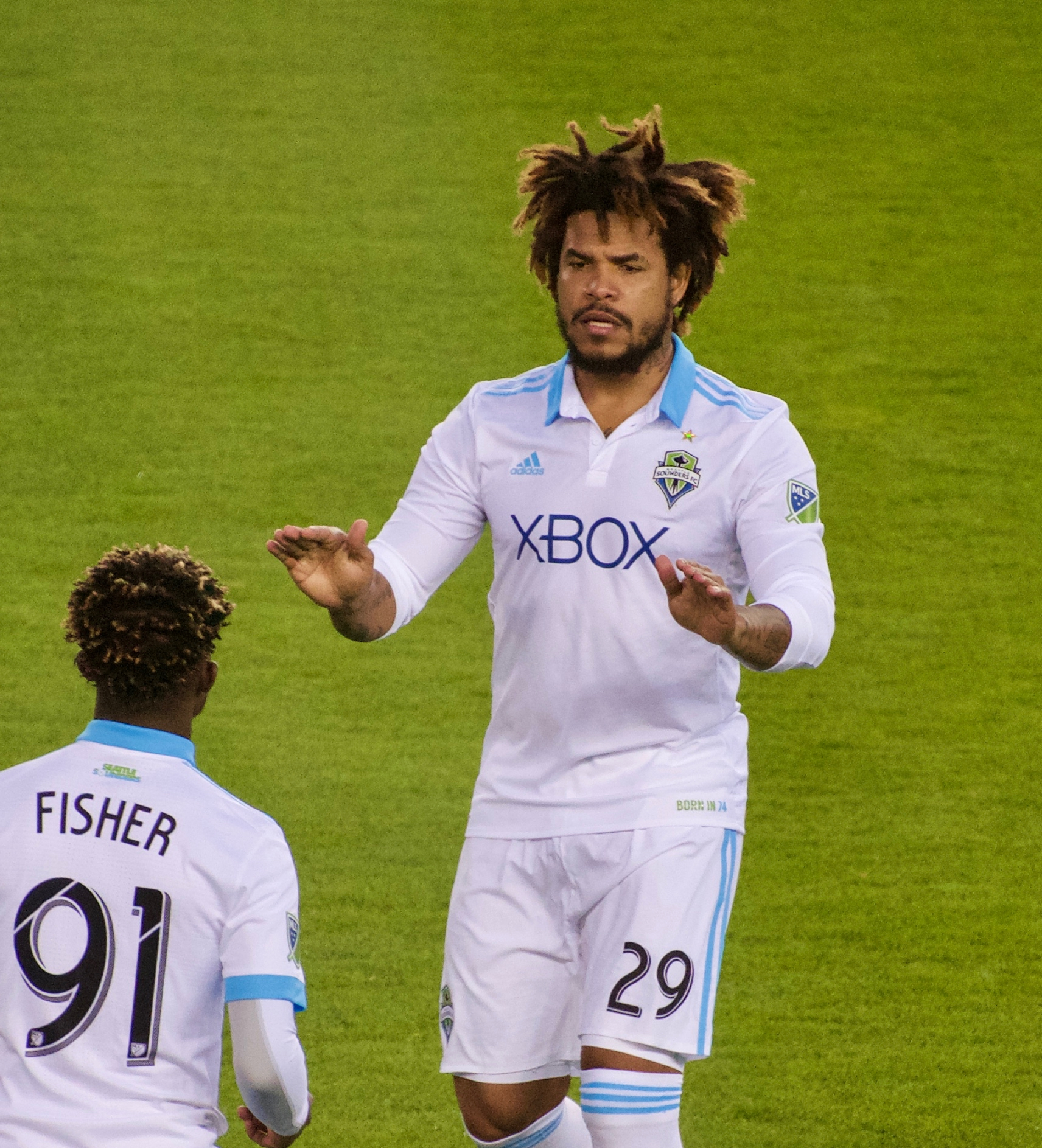
Torres with Seattle Sounders FC in 2017

On 12 August 2015, Torres signed with American club Seattle Sounders FC. He made his debut for the club on 18 August, during a 4–0 win over Orlando City SC in Seattle.

During a match on 12 September against the San Jose Earthquakes, Torres suffered a knee injury that resulted in him being substituted at half-time. It was later revealed to be an anterior cruciate ligament injury, forcing Torres to miss the rest of the season for surgery and rehabilitation. Torres returned to team training in June 2016 and made his full return on 28 August during a match against the Portland Timbers.

On 10 December 2016, Torres scored the Cup-winning penalty in a shoot-out against Toronto FC to win the MLS Cup, the first in Sounders history.

On 2 August 2019, Torres was suspended for ten matches after testing positive for a performance-enhancing substance by the league. He was also fined one-fifth of his salary.

=== Inter Miami CF ===
On 29 December 2019, it was announced that Torres had joined Inter Miami CF ahead of their inaugural season in MLS in 2020.

=== Return to Seattle Sounders FC ===
On September 28, 2020, Torres was traded back to Seattle Sounders FC.

=== Cartagines, Costa Rican League ===
In January 2021, Torres signed with Costa Rican club C.S. Cartaginés.

=== Dallas Sidekicks ===
Torres signed with the Dallas Sidekicks of the Major Arena Soccer League on 3 February 2023.

=== Tacoma Stars ===
Torres returned to the Pacific Northwest in August 2023, signing with the Major Arena Soccer League's Tacoma Stars.

== International career ==
Torres was a member of the Panama U-20 squad that took part in the 2005 FIFA World Youth Cup in the Netherlands.

Torres has made 119 appearances for the full Panama national team, including qualifying matches for the 2006, 2010, 2014 and 2018 World Cup. He made his debut at the 2005 CONCACAF Gold Cup against South Africa on 17 July 2005. He also made three appearances at the 2007 CONCACAF Gold Cup.

While captaining the Panamanian squad in the semi-final match of the 2015 CONCACAF Gold Cup Torres scored the first goal of the match on a header. His team, down a man based on a red card awarded by the referee, lost the match in extra time after Torres was called for a handball late in regulation.

On 10 October 2017, during the final qualifying match for the 2018 FIFA World Cup, Torres scored the game-winning goal against Costa Rica with three minutes left in the game, which combined with the United States' loss to Trinidad and Tobago, helped Panama qualify for their first ever World Cup, making him a national hero.

Torres was named in Panama's 23-man squad for the 2018 World Cup in Russia. Before Panama's final game in the 2018 World Cup against Tunisia, Torres announced his official retirement from the national side. Torres achieved his dream of helping Panama reach the country's first ever World Cup.

However he has since backtracked from his statement, accepting a call-up for a friendly against Venezuela in September 2018, and was included in Panama's squad for the 2019 CONCACAF Gold Cup.

== Career statistics ==
=== International ===
As of 15 November 2019.

Panama
Year	Apps	Goals
2005	4	0
2006	2	0
2007	12	0
2008	4	0
2009	7	0
2010	8	1
2011	13	0
2012	8	0
2013	19	2
2014	8	2
2015	12	3
2016	2	0
2017	7	2
2018	7	0
2019	6	0
Total	119	10

==== International goals ====
Scores and results list Panama's goal tally first.

No.	Date	Venue	Opponent	Score	Result	Competition
1.	3 March 2010	Estadio Metropolitano de Fútbol de Lara, Barquisimeto, Venezuela	Venezuela	1–0	2–1	Friendly
2.	6 February 2013	Estadio Rommel Fernández, Panama City, Panama	Costa Rica	2–0	2–2	2014 FIFA World Cup qualification
3.	24 July 2013	Cowboys Stadium, Arlington, United States	Mexico	2–1	2–1	2013 CONCACAF Gold Cup
4.	10 September 2014	BBVA Compass Stadium, Houston, United States	Nicaragua	2–0	2–0	2014 Copa Centroamericana
5.	13 September 2014	Los Angeles Memorial Coliseum, Los Angeles, United States	El Salvador	1–0	1–0	2014 Copa Centroamericana
6.	27 March 2015	Ato Boldon Stadium, Couva, Trinidad & Tobago	Trinidad and Tobago	1–0	1–0	Friendly
7.	3 June 2015	Estadio Rommel Fernández, Panama City, Panama	Ecuador	1–1	1–1	Friendly
8.	22 July 2015	Georgia Dome, Atlanta, United States	Mexico	1–0	1–2	2015 CONCACAF Gold Cup
9.	13 June 2017	Estadio Rommel Fernández, Panama City, Panama	Honduras	2–2	2–2	2018 FIFA World Cup qualification
10.	10 October 2017	Estadio Rommel Fernández, Panama City, Panama	Costa Rica	2–1	2–1	2018 FIFA World Cup qualification

== Personal life ==
Torres earned a U.S. green card in February 2018, which also qualifies him as a domestic player for MLS roster purposes.

== Honours ==
Chepo

- Copa Rommel Fernández: 2003

San Francisco

- Liga Panameña de Futbol: 2005 Clausura, 2006 Apertura

La Equidad

- Copa Colombia: 2008

Atlético Junior

- Categoría Primera A: 2010 Apertura

Atlético Nacional

- Categoría Primera A: 2011 Apertura

Millonarios

- Categoría Primera A: 2012 Finalización

Seattle Sounders

- MLS Cup: 2016, 2019

Panama

- Copa Centroamericana: 2009; runner-up: 2007
- CONCACAF Gold Cup runner-up: 2005, 2013; third place: 2015

Individual

- CONCACAF Best XI: 2015, 2017

== See also ==
- List of men's footballers with 100 or more international caps
