= Raúl Gudiño =

Mexican footballer (born 1996)

Personal information
- Full name: Raúl Manolo Gudiño Vega
- Date of birth: 22 April 1996 (age 30)
- Place of birth: Guadalajara, Jalisco, Mexico
- Height: 1.97 m (6 ft 6 in)
- Position: Goalkeeper

Team information
- Current team: FC Rànger's
- Number: 1

Youth career
- 2006–2014: Guadalajara

Senior career*
Years	Team	Apps	(Gls)
2014–2018	Porto B	65	(0)
2016	→ União (loan)	11	(0)
2017–2018	→ APOEL (loan)	3	(0)
2018–2022	Guadalajara	85	(0)
2022	Atlanta United	6	(0)
2023–2024	Necaxa	10	(0)
2025	Venados	11	(0)
2025–	FC Rànger's	11	(0)

International career^{‡}
2012–2013	Mexico U17	21	(0)
2014–2015	Mexico U20	4	(0)
2016	Mexico U23	2	(0)
2018–2019	Mexico	5	(0)
Medal record
Representing Mexico
Men's football
Olympic Qualifying Championship
Winner	2015 United States
FIFA U-17 World Cup
Runner-up	2013 United Arab Emirates	Team
CONCACAF U-17 Championship
Winner	2013 Panama	Team
- * Club domestic league appearances and goals as of 5 April 2025 ‡ National team caps and goals as of 8 December 2020

Raúl Manolo Gudiño Vega (born 22 April 1996) is a Mexican professional footballer who plays as a goalkeeper.

== Club career ==
=== Porto ===
On 29 August 2014, Guadalajara announced that Gudiño would be joining Portuguese club FC Porto on a ten-month loan, with an option to make the move permanent. He made his debut for the B team in November 2014 against Academico Viseu in the Segunda Liga. On 14 February 2015, he would block a penalty against Feirense in the 32nd minute to help Porto B clinch a 1–0 victory.

On 16 June 2015, Porto announced they had signed Gudiño on a permanent deal by triggering the buy option for €1.5 million. On 11 February 2016, Gudiño joined União da Madeira on loan from FC Porto for the remainder of the season.

==== APOEL (loan) ====
On 31 August 2017, Gudiño signed with Cypriot side APOEL FC on a season-long loan. On 17 October, during the UEFA Champions League group-stage match against Borussia Dortmund, Gudiño came on as a substitute for Boy Waterman, becoming the first Mexican goalkeeper to play in a Champions League match.

=== Guadalajara ===
On 26 May 2018, Gudiño rejoined Guadalajara after his year-long loan spell with APOEL. On 21 July, he made his debut against Tijuana in a 2–1 loss. On 30 September, during his first Súper Clásico against Club América, Gudiño would block Mateus Uribe’s stoppage-time penalty, keeping the score at 1–1. Following the match, manager José Saturnino Cardozo praised his performance, saying: "[Gudiño] is an excellent goalkeeper, he is growing as a goalkeeper, he has an imposing physique... I think [Mateus Uribe] was frightened by his physical appearance in the penalty box."

=== Atlanta ===
On 20 June 2022, Gudiño joined Atlanta United as a free agent on a 1-year contract.

== International career ==
=== Youth ===
From 2012 to 2013, Gudiño participated with the under-17 side. He participated in the winning side of the 2013 CONCACAF U-17 Championship, where he won the Golden Glove award.

Gudiño was called up to the under-20 team for the 2015 FIFA U-20 World Cup. He was a starter for the first match against Mali but was benched for the following match.

Gudiño won the CONCACAF Youth Goalkeeper of the Year award in 2013 for his performances in the CONCACAF U-17 Championship and the FIFA U-17 World Cup.

=== Senior ===
On 2 October 2018, Gudiño was called up by interim manager Ricardo Ferretti for the October friendlies against Costa Rica and Chile. He earned his first cap with the senior national team on 11 October against Costa Rica, coming on as a half-time substitute for Gibrán Lajud, with Mexico winning the match 3–2.

== Style of play ==
At 1.96 meters (6 ft 5 in), Gudiño stands out for his great reflexes, good aerial game, as well as his penalty-blocking ability.

His playing style has led to comparisons to fellow Mexican goalkeeper Guillermo Ochoa.

== Career statistics ==
=== Club ===
As of 8 October 2023

Club	Season	League			Cup (Note: Includes Cypriot Cup and Copa MX)		Continental		Other		Total	
Club	Season	Division	Apps	Goals	Apps	Goals	Apps	Goals	Apps	Goals	Apps	Goals
Porto B	2014–15	Segunda Liga	16	0	—		—		—		16	0
Porto B	2015–16	LigaPro	22	0	—		—		—		22	0
Porto B	2016–17	LigaPro	26	0	—		—		—		26	0
Porto B	2017–18	LigaPro	0	0	—		—		—		0	0
Porto B	Total		64	0	–		–		—		64	0
União (loan)	2015–16	Primeira Liga	11	0	—		—		—		11	0
APOEL (loan)	2017–18	Cypriot First Division	2	0	4	0	1 (Note: Appearance in UEFA Champions League)	0	—		7	0
Guadalajara	2018–19	Liga MX	28	0	–		—		2 (Note: Appearances in FIFA Club World Cup)	0	28	0
Guadalajara	2019–20	Liga MX	4	0	4	0	—		—		8	0
Guadalajara	2020–21	Liga MX	24	0	–		—		—		24	0
Guadalajara	2021–22	Liga MX	23	0	–		—		—		23	0
Guadalajara	Total		79	0	4	0	—		2	0	85	0
Atlanta United	2022	Major League Soccer	6	0	—		–		–		6	0
Necaxa	2022–23	Liga MX	0	0	—		–		–		0	0
Necaxa	2023–24	Liga MX	10	0	–		—		2 (Note: Appearances in Leagues Cup)	0	12	0
Necaxa	Total		10	0	—		—		2	0	12	0
Career Total			172	0	8	0	1	0	4	0	185	0

=== International ===
As of 15 October 2019

Mexico
Year	Apps	Goals
2018	2	0
2019	3	0
Total	5	0

== Honours ==
APOEL

- Cypriot First Division: 2017–18

Porto B

- LigaPro: 2015–16
- Premier League International Cup: 2016–17

Mexico Youth

- CONCACAF U-17 Championship: 2013
- FIFA U-17 World Cup runner-up: 2013
- CONCACAF Olympic Qualifying Championship: 2015

Individual

- CONCACAF U-17 Championship Golden Glove: 2013
- CONCACAF Men's Goalkeeper of the Year: 2013 (2nd place)
