= 2018 CONCACAF Awards =

2018 North American association football award

CONCACAF Awards 2018
- Website: concacaf.com

The shortlists for the 2018 CONCACAF Awards were announced on 11 December 2018.

The awards are for performances between 1 January and 10 December 2018. The results were announced on 15 January 2019.

== Women's football awards ==
=== Player of the Year ===
Rank	Player	Team
1	(United States) Alex Morgan	(United States) Orlando Pride
2	(Jamaica) Khadija Shaw	(United States) University of Tennessee
3	(United States) Lindsey Horan	(United States) Portland Thorns FC
	(Panama) Yenith Bailey	(Panama) Tauro
	(Haiti) Melchie Dumonay	Haiti U-17
	(United States) Julie Ertz	(United States) Chicago Red Stars
	(Mexico) Alison González	(Mexico) UANL
	(United States) Rose Lavelle	(United States) Washington Spirit
	(Canada) Adriana Leon	(United States) Seattle Reign FC
	(United States) Megan Rapinoe	(United States) Seattle Reign FC

=== Women's Football Coach of the Year ===
Rank	Coach	Team
1	(Jamaica) Hue Menzies	Jamaica (United States) Florida Kraze Krush
2	(United States) Jill Ellis	United States
3	(Mexico) Monica Vergara	Mexico U-17
	(Bermuda) Vance Brown	Bermuda U-15
	(Haiti) Marc Collat	Haiti U-20
	(Mexico) Christopher Cuéllar	Mexico U-20
	(Grenada) Alana Francois	Grenada U-15
	(Denmark) Kenneth Heiner-Møller	Canada
	(Panama) Victor Suárez	Panama
	(Canada) Rhian Wilkinson	Canada U-17

=== Referee of the Year ===
Rank	Referee name
1	(Mexico) Lucila Venegas
2	(Trinidad and Tobago) Crystal Sobers
3	(Canada) Carol Anne Chénard
	(Canada) Marie-Soleil Beaudoin
	(Honduras) Melissa Borjas
	(Costa Rica) Marianela Araya Cruz
	(Mexico) Francia González
	(Nicaragua) Tatiana Guzman
	(Jamaica) Odette Hamilton
	(Jamaica) Cardella Samuels

=== Goalkeeper of the Year ===
Rank	Player name	Team name
1	(United States) Alyssa Naeher	(United States) Chicago Red Stars
2	(Panama) Yenith Bailey	(Panama) San Miguelito
3	(Canada) Stephanie Labbé	(Sweden) Linköpings FC
	(Mexico) Emily Alvarado	(United States) Texas Christian University
	(Haiti) Naphtaline Clerméus	(Haiti) Tigresse
	(Canada) Rylee Foster	(United States) West Virginia Mountaineers
	(Canada) Anna Karpenko	(Canada) Ontario REX
	(United States) Mandy McGlynn	(United States) Virginia Tech Hokies
	(Jamaica) Sydney Schneider	(United States) UNC Wilmington Seahawks
	(Costa Rica) Fabiana Solano	(Costa Rica) Desampa 2000

=== Best XI ===
Shortlist
Defenders		Midfielders		Forwards	
Player name	Team name	Player name	Team name	Player name	Team name
(United States) Becky Sauerbrunn	(United States) Utah Royals FC	(United States) Rose Lavelle	(United States) Washington Spirit	(United States) Alex Morgan	(United States) Orlando Pride
(United States) Crystal Dunn	(United States) NC Courage	(United States) Lindsey Horan	(United States) Portland Thorns	(Canada) Adriana Leon	(United States) Seattle Reign
(Canada) Kadeisha Buchanan	(France) Olympique Lyonnais	(Jamaica) Khadija Shaw	(United States) University of Tennessee	(Canada) Christine Sinclair	(United States) Portland Thorns
(Canada) Quinn (Note: Then known as Rebecca Quinn)	(United States) Washington Spirit	(United States) Julie Ertz	(United States) Chicago Red Stars	(Canada) Jordyn Huitema	(Canada) Vancouver Whitecaps FC Girls Elite BC Soccer REX
(Jamaica) Sashana Campbell	(Israel) Maccabi Kishronot Hadera	(Costa Rica) Shirley Cruz	(China) Jiangsu Suning F.C.	(United States) Megan Rapinoe	(United States) Seattle Reign
(United States) Michela Agresti	United States; FC Stars of Mass	(Canada) Sophie Schmidt	(Germany) 1. FFC Frankfurt	(United States) Tobin Heath	(United States) Portland Thorns
(United States) Kelley O'Hara	(United States) Utah Royals FC	(Haiti) Melchie Dumonay	Haiti; Camp Nous	(Mexico) Alison Gonzalez	Mexico; Tigres UANL
(United States) Abby Dahlkemper	(United States) NC Courage	(Canada) Jessie Fleming	(United States) University of California, Los Angeles	(Jamaica) Jody Brown	(Italy) AS Roma
(Mexico) Tanna Sanchez	Mexico; Tecnológico de Monterrey Campus Puebla	(Panama) Marta Cox	(Colombia) Deportes Quindío	(Panama) Lineth Cedeño	(Panama) Tauro FC
(Canada) Olivia Cooke	Canada; Ontario REX	(Mexico) Nicole Perez	Mexico; CD Guadalajara	(Canada) Nichelle Prince	(United States) Houston Dash

Final Selection
Goalkeeper
- (United States) Alyssa Naeher
Defenders
- (Canada) Kadeisha Buchanan
- (United States) Crystal Dunn
- (Mexico) Tanna Sanchez
- (United States) Becky Sauerbrunn
Midfielders
- (United States) Lindsey Horan
- (Jamaica) Khadija Shaw
- (Mexico) Nicole Perez
Forwards
- (United States) Alex Morgan
- (Canada) Christine Sinclair
- (Jamaica) Jody Brown

== Men's football awards ==
=== Player of the Year ===
Rank	Player	Team
1	(Mexico) Hirving Lozano	(Netherlands) PSV Eindhoven
2	(Costa Rica) Keylor Navas	(Spain) Real Madrid
3	(Italy) Sebastian Giovinco	(Canada) Toronto FC
	(Honduras) Román Castillo	(Honduras) Motagua
	(Mexico) Héctor Herrera	(Portugal) Porto
	(Jamaica) Kemar Lawrence	(United States) New York Red Bulls
	(Costa Rica) Keylor Navas	(Spain) Real Madrid
	(Canada) Jonathan Osorio	(Canada) Toronto FC
	(Mexico) Alan Pulido	(Mexico) Guadalajara
	(Costa Rica) Yendrick Ruiz	(Costa Rica) Herdiano
	(Mexico) Carlos Vela	(United States) Los Angeles FC

=== Men's Football Coach of the Year ===
Rank	Coach	Team
1	(Argentina) Matías Almeyda	(United States) San Jose Earthquakes (formerly (Mexico) Guadalajara)
2	(Curaçao) Remko Bicentini	Curaçao
3	(Colombia) Juan Carlos Osorio	Paraguay (formerly Mexico)
	(Scotland) Willie Donachie	Montserrat
	(Brazil) Ricardo Ferretti	(Mexico) UANL
	(United States) Jesse Marsch	(Germany) RB Leipzig (formerly (United States) New York Red Bulls)
	(Mexico) Jacques Passy	Saint Kitts and Nevis
	(United States) Tab Ramos	United States U-20
	(United States) Greg Vanney	(Canada) Toronto FC
	(Argentina) Diego Vásquez	(Honduras) Motagua

=== Referee of the Year ===
Rank	Referee
1	(Mexico) César Ramos
2	(United States) Mark Geiger
3	(El Salvador) Joel Aguilar
	(El Salvador) Ivan Barton
	(Guatemala) Mario Escobar
	(United States) Jair Marrufo
	(Costa Rica) Ricardo Montero
	(Jamaica) Oshane Nation
	(Mexico) Marco Ortíz
	(Panama) John Pitti

=== Goalkeeper of the Year ===
Rank	Player	Team
1	(Costa Rica) Keylor Navas	(Spain) Real Madrid
2	(Mexico) Guillermo Ochoa	(Belgium) Standard Liège
3	(Puerto Rico) Cody Laurendi	(United States) OKC Energy FC
	(United States) Alex Bono	(Canada) Toronto FC
	(Mexico) Rodolfo Cota	(Mexico) León (formerly (Mexico) Guadalajara)
	(Dominican Republic) Miguel Lloyd	(Panama) Árabe Unido
	(Costa Rica) Leonel Moreira	(Costa Rica) Herediano
	(United States) Luis Robles	(United States) New York Red Bulls
	(Martinique) Olivier Rosa-Arsene	(Martinique) Club Franciscain
	(Argentina) Jonathan Felipe Rougier	(Honduras) Motagua

=== Best XI ===
Shortlist
Defenders		Midfielders		Forwards	
Player name	Team name	Player name	Team name	Player name	Team name
(Mexico) Edson Álvarez	(Mexico) América	(Canada) Jonathan Osorio	(Canada) Toronto FC	(Italy) Sebastian Giovinco	(Canada) Toronto FC
(Mexico) Oswaldo Alanis	(Spain) Oviedo (formerly (Mexico) Guadalajara)	(Colombia) Mateus Uribe	(Mexico) América	(Mexico) Hirving Lozano	(Netherlands) PSV Eindhoven
(Saint Kitts and Nevis) Atiba Harris	(United States) OKC Energy FC	(Costa Rica) Yendrick Ruiz	(Costa Rica) Herediano	(France) André-Pierre Gignac	(Mexico) UANL
(Mexico) Jair Pereira	(Mexico) Guadalajara	(Uruguay) Nicolás Lodeiro	(United States) Seattle Sounders FC	(Mexico) Carlos Vela	(United States) Los Angeles FC
(Honduras) Juan Pablo Montes	(Honduras) Motagua	(El Salvador) Óscar Cerén	(El Salvador) Alianza	(Honduras) Román Castillo	(Honduras) Motagua
(Mexico) Hugo Ayala	(Mexico) UANL	(Mexico) Andrés Guardado	(Spain) Real Betis	(Mexico) Alan Pulido	(Mexico) Guadalajara
(Costa Rica) Francisco Calvo	(United States) Minnesota United FC	(Costa Rica) Randall Azofeifa	(Costa Rica) Herediano	(Haiti) Duckens Nazon	(Belgium) Sint-Truiden
(Jamaica) Kemar Lawrence	(United States) New York Red Bulls	(Cuba) Luis Paradela	(Cuba) Pinar del Río	(England) Bradley Wright-Phillips	(United States) New York Red Bulls
(Canada) Ashtone Morgan	(Canada) Toronto FC	(Mexico) Héctor Herrera	(Portugal) Porto	(Canada) Alphonso Davies	(Germany) Bayern Munich (formerly (Canada) Vancouver Whitecaps FC)
(Curaçao) Cuco Martina	(England) Stoke City	(United States) Michael Bradley	(Canada) Toronto FC	(Mexico) Raúl Jiménez	(England) Wolverhampton Wanderers

Final Selection
Goalkeeper
- (Costa Rica) Keylor Navas
Defenders
- (Mexico) Edson Álvarez
- (Mexico) Hugo Ayala
- (Curaçao) Cuco Martina
- (Costa Rica) Francisco Calvo
Midfielders
- (Mexico) Héctor Herrera
- (United States) Michael Bradley
- (Mexico) Andrés Guardado
Forwards
- (Mexico) Hirving Lozano
- (England) Bradley Wright-Phillips
- (Italy) Sebastian Giovinco

== Mixed-sex ==
=== Goal of the Year ===
Rank	Player	Competition	Match	Minute scored
1	(United States) Joe Corona	2018 CONCACAF Champions League	(Mexico) Club América vs (Panama) Tauro FC	19'
2	(Mexico) Alan Pulido	2018 CONCACAF Champions League	(Mexico) CD Guadalajara vs (Canada) Toronto FC	72'
3	(Jamaica) Khadija Shaw	2018 CONCACAF Women's Championship	Jamaica vs Cuba	2'
	(Guyana) Shacaylah Williams	2018 CONCACAF Girls' U-15 Championship	Guyana vs Bahamas	72'
	(United States) Alexis Méndez	2018 CONCACAF U-20 Championship	United States vs Costa Rica	15'
	(Montserrat) Spencer Weir-Daley	2019–20 CONCACAF Nations League qualifying	Montserrat vs Belize	74'
	(Panama) Blas Pérez	2018 CONCACAF League	(Panama) C.D. Árabe Unido vs (El Salvador) C.D. FAS	51'
	(Costa Rica) Jimmy Marín	2018 CONCACAF League	(Honduras) FC Motagua vs CS (Costa Rica) Herediano	85'
	(United States) Rose Lavelle	2018 CONCACAF Women's Championship	United States vs Canada	2'
	(Curaçao) Ruensley Leuteria	2019–20 CONCACAF Nations League qualifying	Curaçao vs Grenada	91'

=== Outstanding Performance Award ===
- Jamaica national women's football team
