= Juan Carlos Osorio =

Colombian football manager (born 1961)

- Osorio as Mexico manager at the 2018 FIFA World Cup

Personal information
- Full name: Juan Carlos Osorio Arbeláez
- Date of birth: 8 June 1961 (age 65)
- Place of birth: Santa Rosa de Cabal, Colombia
- Height: 1.78 m (5 ft 10 in)
- Position: Midfielder

College career
Years	Team	Apps	(Gls)
1985–1986	New Haven Chargers		
1988	Southern Connecticut		

Senior career*
Years	Team	Apps	(Gls)
1982–1984	Deportivo Pereira		
1984–1985	Internacional		
1986–1987	Once Caldas		

Managerial career
- 2006–2007: Millonarios
- 2007: Chicago Fire
- 2007–2009: New York Red Bulls
- 2010–2011: Once Caldas
- 2011–2012: Puebla
- 2012–2015: Atlético Nacional
- 2015: São Paulo
- 2015–2018: Mexico
- 2018–2019: Paraguay
- 2019–2020: Atlético Nacional
- 2021–2022: América de Cali
- 2023: Zamalek
- 2024: Athletico Paranaense
- 2024–2025: Tijuana
- 2026: Remo
- * Club domestic league appearances and goals

Juan Carlos Osorio Arbeláez (Spanish pronunciation: [xwaŋ ˈkaɾlos oˈsoɾjo aɾβeˈlaes]; born 8 June 1961) is a Colombian football manager and former footballer.

Osorio began his playing career with Deportivo Pereira in 1982, and went on to play for Brazilian club Internacional in 1984 before returning to his native Colombia a year later, ultimately retiring in 1987 at the age of 26 due to injury.

Nicknamed El Recreacionista (The Recreationist in Spanish) due to his unorthodox training methods, Osorio held various assistant coaching jobs before beginning his managerial career in 2006 with Millonarios, moving abroad the following year to manage Major League Soccer teams Chicago Fire and New York Red Bulls, leading the latter to their first conference title in 2008. He managed Once Caldas in 2010 and led them to a league title, as well as managing Atlético Nacional in 2012 and winning numerous championships. In October 2015, he was named as manager of the Mexico national team, a post he held until July 2018.

== Early life ==
After playing for Deportivo Pereira and Internacional, Osorio moved to the USA and represented University of New Haven's New Haven Chargers from 1985 to 1986. He graduated from Southern Connecticut State University in 1990 with a B.A. in Exercise Science. Osorio also holds a diploma in Science and Football from Liverpool John Moores University, a UEFA "A" coaching license from the English FA, and a coaching certificate from the Royal Netherlands Football Association.

== Managerial career ==
=== Assistant ===
Juan Carlos Osorio began his coaching career during the 1998–1999 season joining the Staten Island Vipers as their assistant/conditioning coach. He would then join the MetroStars staff during the 2000 season under Octavio Zambrano. He would go on to join English club Manchester City as conditioning coach in June 2001.

=== Millonarios ===
In 2006, Osorio started his career as a manager when he was hired by Millonarios in his native Colombia. He led the Bogotá-based club to an 11-6-7 record during the 2007 Finalizacion (closing) season and a fourth-place finish out of 18 teams in the Mustang Cup. In 2007, he was the recipient of the DIMAYOR (División Mayor del Fútbol Colombiano) Excellence in Football Coaching award becoming the first coach to win that award in his first year of coaching.

=== Chicago Fire ===
In July 2007 he was appointed manager of Major League Soccer side Chicago Fire. He took over a last-place team and led them to a playoff spot. He also helped Chicago orchestrate a first-round series victory against D.C. United, which entered the playoffs with the best record in MLS. On 10 December, the Chicago Fire announced that Osorio had resigned due to "family reasons". In his short time with the Fire, Osorio went 6-3-6 in the league, 7-5-7 across all competitions and led the team to the Conference Final for the sixth time in nine seasons.

=== New York Red Bulls ===
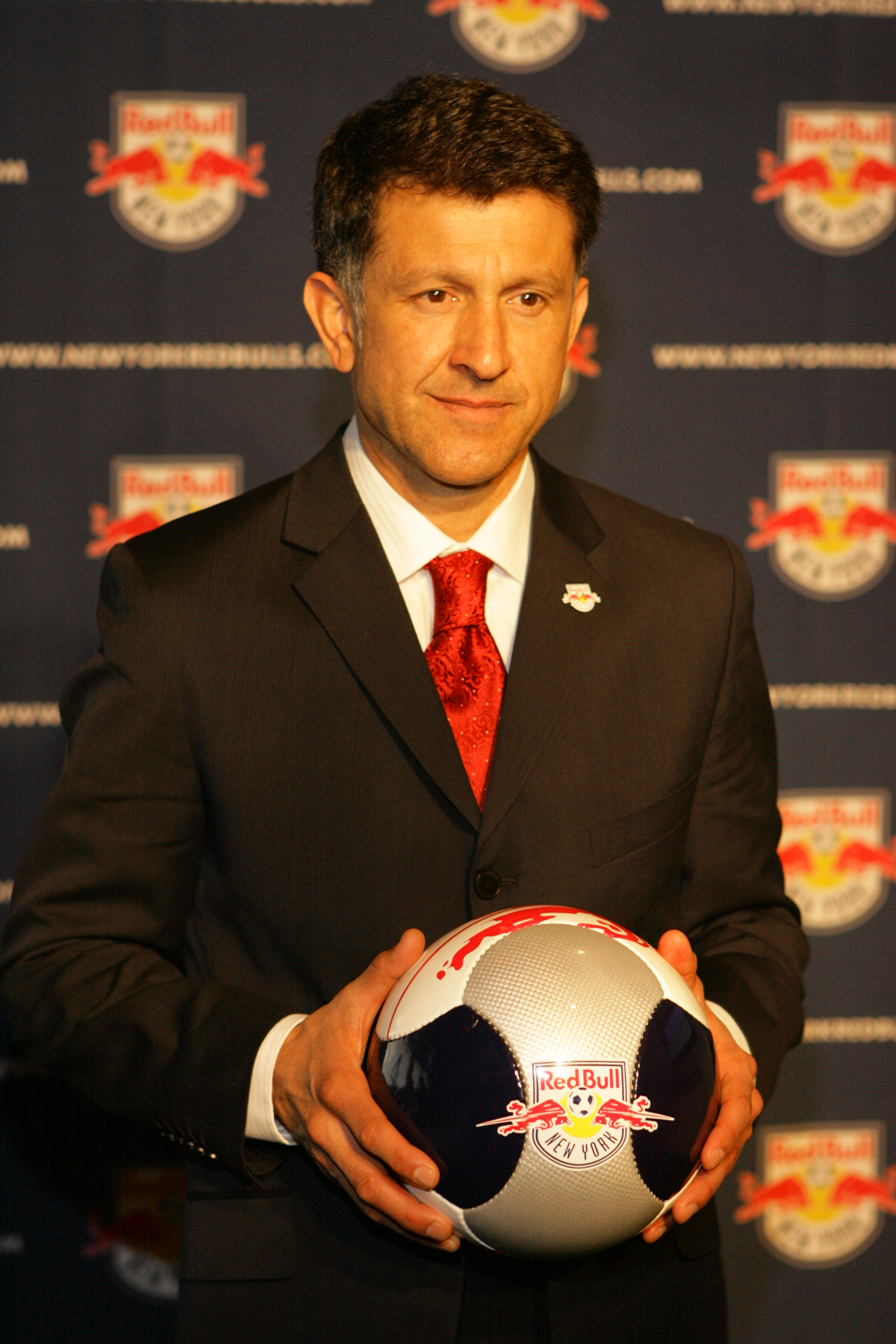
Osorio during his time at New York Red Bulls

Eight days after resigning from the Chicago Fire, Osorio was hired by the New York Red Bulls. The decision came after Red Bulls and Fire reached an agreement on compensation for Osorio. The Red Bulls had an up and down season in Osorio's first season in charge of the club. After a promising start, the club qualified for the playoffs on the final day of the season and was seeded as a wild card into the Western Conference bracket. In the 2008 MLS Cup Playoffs, Osorio lead the club to their first ever MLS Cup final, defeating defending champion Houston Dynamo (4–1 on aggregate) and Real Salt Lake 1–0. In the MLS Cup final, the Red Bulls lost 3–1 to Columbus Crew. In his second season with the club, Osorio guided them to one of the worst records in league history, finishing with a 2-16-4 record. In his two seasons at the club Osorio went 12-27-13, the worst mark in the league during that period of time. The club also suffered an embarrassing set-back when they were eliminated by W Connection in the preliminary round of the CONCACAF Champions League. Due to mounting pressure, Osorio resigned from his post as coach of the New York Red Bulls on 21 August 2009.

=== Once Caldas ===
After leaving New York, on 18 November 2009 Osorio was hired by Once Caldas. After taking charge of a team that was in danger of relegation Osorio helped Once Caldas to a league title in 2010. In 44 matches in charge, he recorded a record of 23 victories, 8 draws, and 13 losses. In January 2011 it was reported that Osorio would be leaving Once Caldas to take charge of the Honduras national team.

On 2 February 2011, Osorio was officially named as the new coach of the Honduras national team and to lead them during the qualifying rounds of the 2014 FIFA World Cup. However, Once Caldas announced Osorio contractually could not be released until June to assume his role with Honduras. Due to this, Honduras' football federation announced they could not wait until June, subsequently ending the negotiations.

=== Puebla ===
On 15 November, the president of Mexican club Puebla Roberto Henaine announced via Twitter that Juan Carlos Osorio would be manager, following Sergio Bueno departure. He resigned on 22 March 2012 due to poor performances, leaving the club with a 2-2-3 record.

=== São Paulo ===
On 26 May 2015, Osorio was confirmed as the new manager of São Paulo FC, signing a two-year contract. He was presented on 1 June and made his debut five days later, in a 2–0 victory against Grêmio at Estádio do Morumbi.

=== Mexico ===
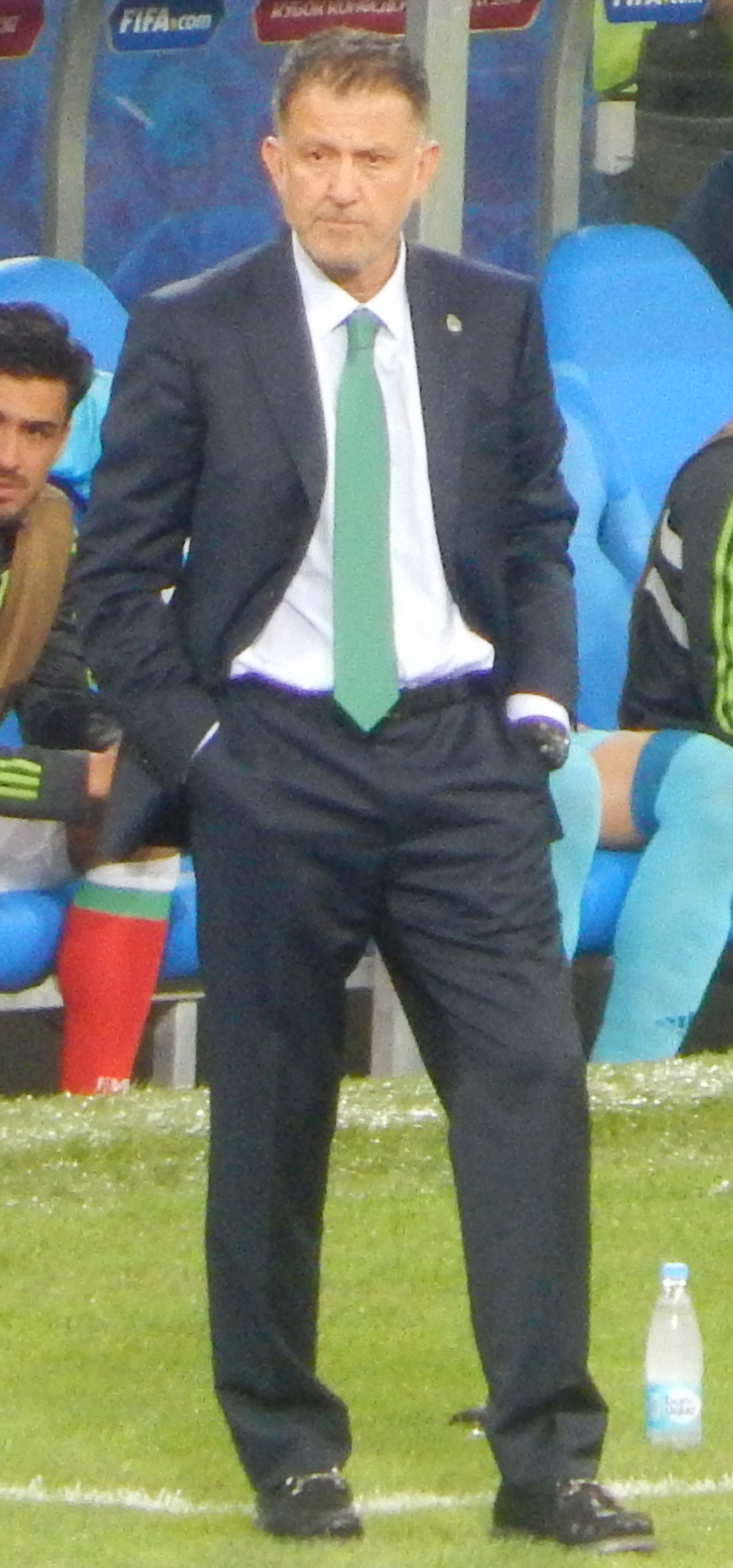
Osorio at the 2017 Confederations Cup.

On 14 October 2015, after heavy media speculation, Osorio was confirmed as head coach of the Mexico national football team, signing a three-year contract. He was the twelfth coach appointed in nine years, and the first Colombian. Though information of his salary went undisclosed, Spanish newspaper El País reported that Osorio would receive an annual salary of US$1.2 million, 60 percent less than what former manager Miguel Herrera earned during his time in charge.

On 13 November, Osorio won his first game in charge of Mexico, defeating El Salvador 3–0 at Estadio Azteca in their opening match of the 2018 World Cup fourth-round qualifiers. Mexico finished at the top of Group A with 16 points, advancing to the hexagonal round.

Osorio led Mexico to the Copa América Centenario on a 16-match unbeaten streak that began in June 2016. Mexico placed first in their group with 7 points, defeating Uruguay, Jamaica, and drawing with Venezuela. In the quarterfinal match against Chile, the team suffered a 7–0 defeat, ending the unbeaten streak at 22 games. After the match, Osorio apologized to Mexico's fans for what he described as an "embarrassment" and "an accident of soccer".

Following Mexico's participation at the 2017 FIFA Confederations Cup, where the team finished in fourth place, Osorio was suspended by FIFA for six games after using insulting words and displaying aggressive and confrontational behavior towards officials during the third place play-off match against Portugal.

On 2 September, following their 1–0 victory over Panama, Mexico secured their qualification to the 2018 FIFA World Cup. On 6 October, Mexico defeated Trinidad and Tobago 3–1, taking their points tally to 21, thus assuring Mexico will finish at the top of the qualification table for the first time since 1997.

In March 2018, it was reported that Osorio had rejected an offer from the Mexican Football Federation to extend his contract with the Mexico national team. In the 2018 World Cup group stage, he led Mexico to beat the defending champions Germany 1–0, then South Korea 2–1, before losing 3–0 against Sweden; however, they qualified to the round of 16, where they lost 2–0 to Brazil. Osorio fulfilled his contract and left his post shortly after.

=== Paraguay ===
On 3 September 2018, the Paraguayan Football Association appointed Osorio as manager of the Paraguay national football team to face the 2019 Copa América and the CONMEBOL qualifiers for the 2022 FIFA World Cup in Qatar. A mutual termination of the contract occurred on 13 February 2019.

=== Atlético Nacional ===
On 10 June 2019, Juan Carlos Osorio was confirmed as manager of Atlético Nacional. Osorio's second spell with the club ended on 1 November 2020 after 20 wins, 18 draws and 12 losses, as he was sacked following a 3–0 defeat to Nacional's rivals Millonarios.

=== América de Cali ===
On 16 June 2021, Osorio was announced as the new manager of América de Cali. On 31 March 2022, he left his post at the club by mutual consent due to poor results and disagreements on sports project with the board of directors.

=== Zamalek ===
On 13 April 2023, Egyptian club Zamalek announced the appointment of Osorio as head coach. Later that year, on 5 November, he was sacked from his position after two consecutive losses in the first six matches of the 2023–24 season.

=== Athletico Paranaense ===
On 3 January 2024, Osorio was announced as head coach of Athletico Paranaense, returning to Brazil after nearly nine years. Two months later, on 3 March, the club parted ways with Osorio.

=== Tijuana ===
On 24 May 2024, Mexican club Tijuana announced Osorio as their new head coach. On 30 July, Osorio received a four-game ban for violent conduct after he confronted a linesman during a Leagues Cup match. On 11 March 2025, he was dismissed from his position.

=== Remo ===
On 17 December 2025, Osorio returned to Brazil and its top tier, after being named head coach of Remo. The following 1 March, he was dismissed after a loss to rivals Paysandu in the first leg of the 2026 Campeonato Paraense finals.

== Managerial statistics ==
Statistics accurate as of match played 1 March 2026

Team	Nat	From	To	Record				
Team	Nat	From	To	P	W	D	L	Win %
Millonarios	(Colombia)	1 January 2006	30 June 2007	48	22	9	17	45.83
Chicago Fire	(United States)	1 July 2007	10 December 2007	18	7	7	4	38.89
New York Red Bulls	(United States)	18 December 2007	21 August 2009	59	14	15	30	23.73
Once Caldas	(Colombia)	1 January 2010	27 December 2011	100	48	24	28	48.00
Puebla	(Mexico)	1 January 2012	21 March 2012	11	2	2	7	18.18
Atlético Nacional	(Colombia)	3 May 2012	25 May 2015	237	126	59	52	53.16
São Paulo	(Brazil)	26 May 2015	6 October 2015	28	12	7	9	42.86
Mexico	(Mexico)	14 October 2015	27 July 2018	52	33	9	10	63.46
Paraguay	(Paraguay)	3 September 2018	13 February 2019	1	0	1	0	0.00
Atlético Nacional	(Colombia)	1 July 2019	17 November 2020	50	22	17	11	44.00
América de Cali	(Colombia)	1 July 2021	31 March 2022	49	15	11	23	30.61
Zamalek	(Egypt)	13 April 2023	5 November 2023	25	13	6	6	52.00
Athletico Paranaense	(Brazil)	3 January 2024	3 March 2024	12	7	4	1	58.33
Tijuana	(Mexico)	24 May 2024	11 March 2025	34	12	7	15	35.29
Remo	(Brazil)	17 December 2025	1 March 2026	14	4	8	2	28.57
Total				736	336	185	215	45.65

== Honours ==
=== Manager ===
New York Red Bulls

- MLS Western Conference: 2008

Once Caldas

- Categoría Primera A: 2010-II

Atlético Nacional

- Categoría Primera A: 2013-I, 2013-II, 2014-I
- Copa Colombia: 2012, 2013
- Superliga Colombiana: 2012

Remo

- Super Copa Grão-Pará: 2026

Individual

- CONCACAF Men's Football Coach of the Year: 2017 (3rd place), 2018 (3rd place)
