= 2024–25 CONCACAF Awards =

2025 North American association football award

CONCACAF Awards 2024–25

Highlights
- Player of the Year: Men's: (Canada) Jonathan David; Women's: (Haiti) Melchie Dumornay
- Goal of the Year: (Mexico) Raúl Jiménez
- Website: concacaf.com

The shortlists for the 2024–25 CONCACAF Awards were announced on 15 August 2025.

The winners were announced on 6 November 2025.

== Men's Player of the Year ==
| Rank | Player | Club |
|---|---|---|
| 1 | (Canada) Jonathan David | (France) Lille |
| | (Mexico) Edson Álvarez | (England) West Ham United |
| | (Mexico) Raúl Jiménez | (England) Fulham |
| | (Mexico) Ángel Sepúlveda | (Mexico) Cruz Azul |
| | (United States) Malik Tillman | (Netherlands) PSV Eindhoven |
| | (Costa Rica) Manfred Ugalde | (Russia) Spartak Moscow |

== Women's Player of the Year ==
| Rank | Player | Club |
|---|---|---|
| 1 | (Haiti) Melchie Dumornay | (France) Lyon |
| | (Mexico) Charlyn Corral | (Mexico) Pachuca |
| | (United States) Emily Fox | (England) Arsenal |
| | (United States) Lindsey Heaps | (France) Lyon |
| | (Mexico) Lizbeth Ovalle | (Mexico) Tigres UANL |
| | (Jamaica) Khadija Shaw | (England) Manchester City |

== Goal of the Year ==
| Rank | Player | Match | Competition | Minute | Date |
|---|---|---|---|---|---|
| 1 | (Mexico) Raúl Jiménez | Canada – Mexico | 2025 CONCACAF Nations League Finals | 75' | 20 March 2025 |
| | (Honduras) Jorge Álvarez | Honduras – Curaçao | 2025 CONCACAF Gold Cup | 32' | 24 June 2025 |
| | (United States) Sebastian Berhalter | Pumas UNAM – Vancouver Whitecaps FC | 2025 CONCACAF Champions Cup | 33' | 9 April 2025 |
| | (Gabon) Denis Bouanga | Los Angeles FC – Columbus Crew | 2025 CONCACAF Champions Cup | 46' | 4 March 2025 |
| | (Costa Rica) Francisco Calvo | Costa Rica – Guatemala | 2024–25 CONCACAF Nations League | 72' | 15 October 2024 |
| | (El Salvador) Melvin Cartagena | Águila – Olimpia | 2024 CONCACAF Central American Cup | 53' | 22 August 2024 |
| | (Spain) Esther González | Alajuelense – NJ/NY Gotham | 2024–25 CONCACAF W Champions Cup | 3' | 5 September 2024 |
| | (Argentina) Lionel Messi | Inter Miami CF – Los Angeles FC | 2025 CONCACAF Champions Cup | 35' | 9 April 2025 |
| | (Dominican Republic) Edipo Rodríguez | Cibao – Ouanaminthe | 2024 CONCACAF Caribbean Cup | 33' | 1 October 2024 |
| | (Panama) José Rodríguez | Panama – Costa Rica | 2024–25 CONCACAF Nations League | 45+3' | 18 November 2024 |
| | (Trinidad and Tobago) Dante Sealy | Saudi Arabia – Trinidad and Tobago | 2025 CONCACAF Gold Cup | 10' | 22 June 2025 |
| | (Canada) Christine Sinclair | Portland Thorns – América | 2024–25 CONCACAF W Champions Cup | 13' | 4 September 2024 |
