= 2023–24 CONCACAF Awards =

2024 North American association football award

CONCACAF Awards 2023–24
- Date: 24 October 2024
- Presented by: CONCACAF

Highlights
- Player of the Year: Men's: (Panama) Adalberto Carrasquilla; Women's: (Haiti) Melchie Dumornay
- Goal of the Year: (France) André-Pierre Gignac
- Website: concacaf.com

The shortlists for the 2023–24 CONCACAF Awards were announced on 23 July 2024.

The winners were announced on 24 October 2024.

== Men's Player of the Year ==
Rank	Player	Club
1	(Panama) Adalberto Carrasquilla	(United States) Houston Dynamo FC
	(Jamaica) Leon Bailey	(England) Aston Villa
	(Canada) Jonathan David	(France) Lille
	(Canada) Alphonso Davies	(Germany) Bayern Munich
	(Mexico) Santiago Giménez	(Netherlands) Feyenoord
	(United States) Christian Pulisic	(Italy) Milan

== Women's Player of the Year ==
Rank	Player	Club
1	(Haiti) Melchie Dumornay	(France) Lyon
	(Mexico) Charlyn Corral	(Mexico) Pachuca
	(Canada) Adriana Leon	(England) Aston Villa
	(Mexico) Lizbeth Ovalle	(Mexico) Tigres UANL
	(Jamaica) Khadija Shaw	(England) Manchester City
	(United States) Sophia Smith	(United States) Portland Thorns FC

== Goal of the Year ==
Rank	Player	Match	Competition	Date	Ref.
1	(France) André-Pierre Gignac	Vancouver Whitecaps FC – Tigres UANL	2024 CONCACAF Champions Cup	7 February 2024	
	(United States) Tyler Adams	United States – Mexico	2024 CONCACAF Nations League Finals	24 March 2024	
	(Guadeloupe) Anthony Baron	Cuba – Guadeloupe	2023 CONCACAF Gold Cup	1 July 2023	
	(Mexico) Luis Chávez	Jamaica – Mexico	2023 CONCACAF Gold Cup	12 July 2023	
	(Honduras) Michaell Chirinos	Costa Rica – Honduras	2024 Copa América qualifying	23 March 2024	
	(Mexico) Santiago Giménez	Panama – Mexico	2023 CONCACAF Gold Cup	16 July 2023	
	(Panama) Michael Amir Murillo	Uruguay – Panama	2024 Copa América	23 June 2024	
	(Costa Rica) Joshua Navarro	Alajuelense – Motagua	2023 CONCACAF Central American Cup	31 August 2023	
	(Mexico) Jacqueline Ovalle	United States – Mexico	2024 CONCACAF W Gold Cup	26 February 2024	
	(Mexico) Mayra Pelayo	United States – Mexico	2024 CONCACAF W Gold Cup	26 February 2024	
	(United States) Christian Pulisic	United States – Bolivia	2024 Copa América	23 June 2024	
	(Honduras) Edwin Rodríguez	Honduras – Grenada	2023–24 CONCACAF Nations League	12 September 2023	
