= Amelia Valverde =

Costa Rican football manager (born 1987)

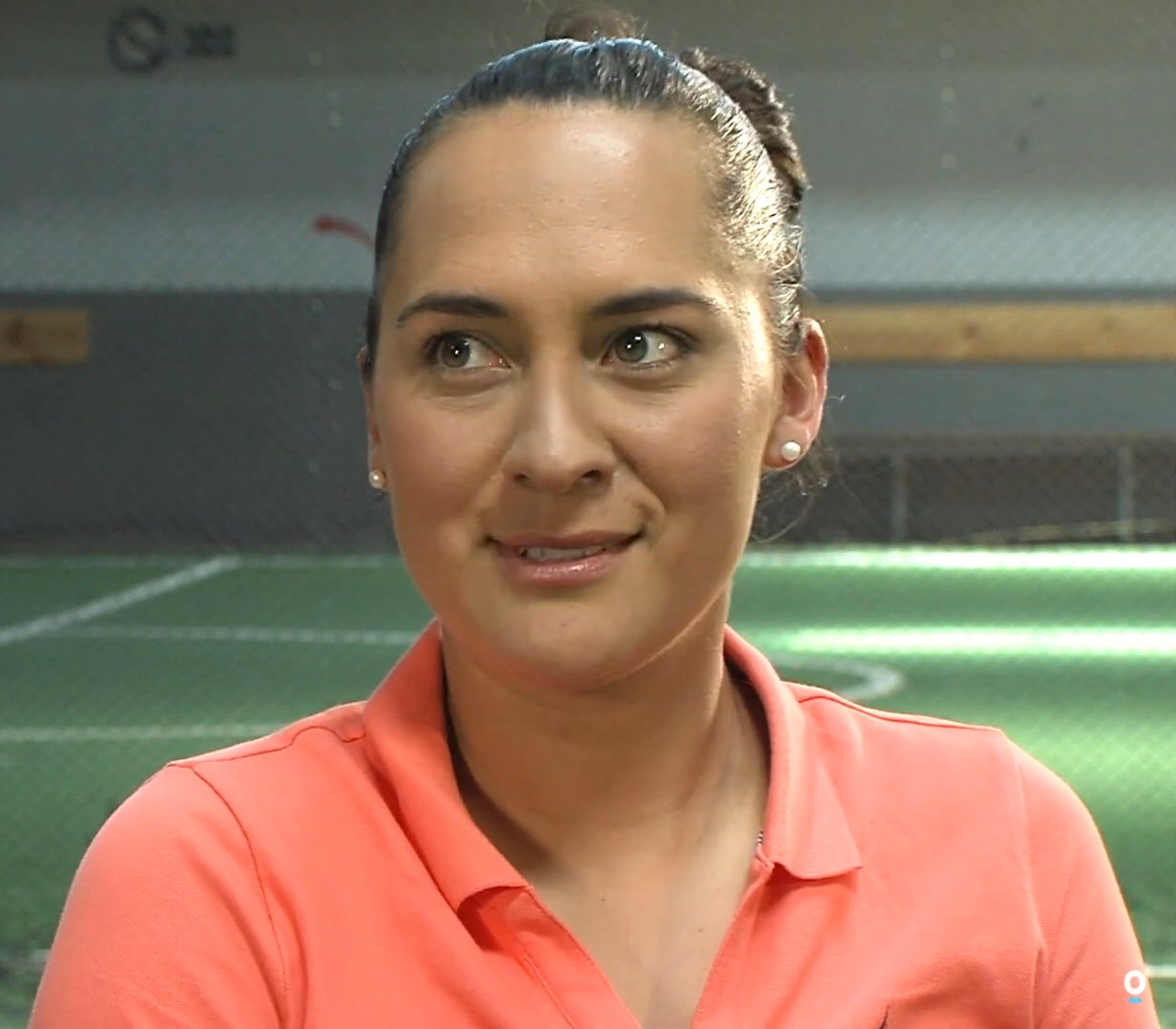
- Valverde in 2019

Personal information
- Full name: Amelia Valverde Villalobos
- Date of birth: 14 January 1987 (age 39)
- Place of birth: Costa Rica

Team information
- Current team: India (head coach)

Senior career*
| Years | Team | Apps | (Gls) |
- Flores de Heredia
- Saprissa

Managerial career
- 2011–2014: Costa Rica Women (assistant)
- 2015–2023: Costa Rica Women
- 2024–2025: C.F. Monterrey Femenil
- 2026–: India Women
Medal record
Women's football
Representing Costa Rica (as manager)
Pan American Games
| Bronze medal – third place | 2019 Lima |
Central American and Caribbean Games
| Silver medal – second place | 2018 Barranquilla |
Central American Games
| Gold medal – first place | 2017 Managua |
- * Club domestic league appearances and goals

Amelia Valverde Villalobos (born 14 January 1987) is a Costa Rican association football manager who currently serves as head coach for the India women's national football team.

== Career ==
Valverde was previously part of the Costa Rica women's national football team program from 2011 to 2014 in various roles, including assistant manager of the senior and under-20 teams, and finally manager of the senior team from 2015 to 2023.

Prior to her career as a manager, she played in the Costa Rican Women's Premier Division for Flores de Heredia (now known as Herediano) and Saprissa.

In 2026, she served as the head coach of the India women's national football team during the 2026 AFC Women's Asian Cup.

== Honours ==
=== Costa Rica ===
- Central American Games: 2017

=== C.F. Monterrey ===
- Liga MX Femenil: Clausura 2024

=== Individual ===
- CONCACAF Female Coach of the Year: 2016
- Balón de Oro Best Female Manager: 2023–24
