= Shirley Cruz =

Costa Rican footballer (born 1985)

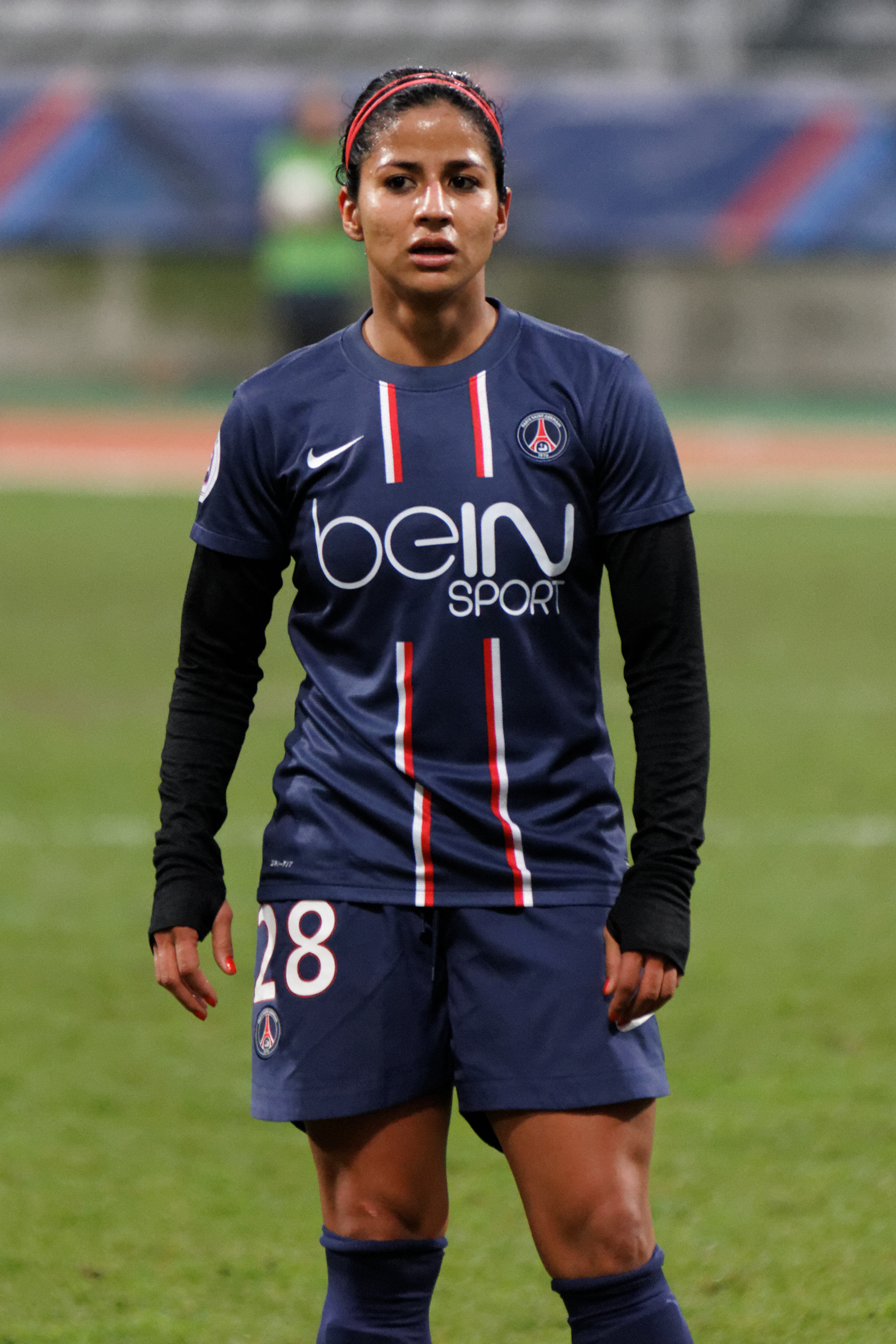
- Cruz Traña with PSG in 2012–13 season

Personal information
- Full name: Shirley Cruz Traña
- Date of birth: 28 August 1985 (age 41)
- Place of birth: San José, Costa Rica
- Height: 1.65 m (5 ft 5 in)
- Position: Midfielder

Team information
- Current team: Toluca (women) (assistant)

Youth career
- 1997–1999: CF Universidad
- 1999–2000: AD Goicoechea
- 2000–2002: CS Desamparados
- 2002–2005: UCEM Alajuela
- 2005: Saprissa FF

Senior career*
Years	Team	Apps	(Gls)
2006–2012	Lyon	115	(24)
2012–2018	Paris Saint-Germain	91	(16)
2018	Jiangsu Suning	0	(0)
2019–2020	Alajuelense	9	(5)
2020–2021	OL Reign	12	(2)
2022–2023	Alajuelense		

International career^{‡}
2002–2023	Costa Rica	109	(34)

Managerial career
- 2025–: Toluca (women) (assistant)
Medal record
Women's football
Representing Costa Rica
Pan American Games
Bronze medal – third place	2019 Lima	Team
- * Club domestic league appearances and goals as of 8 June 2023 ‡ National team caps and goals as of 23 February 2023

Shirley Cruz Traña (born 28 August 1985) is a retired Costa Rican professional footballer who played as a midfielder. A creative midfielder who often acts as a deep-lying playmaker, Cruz is the second-ever female footballer behind Gabriela Trujillo from Costa Rica to play in Europe when she joined Lyon in 2005.

== Early life ==
Cruz was born in San José, capital city of Costa Rica, and discovered and learned the sport of football from her seven brothers.

== Club career ==
Cruz began her football career at CF Universidad in San Pedro, San José. Cruz made a name for herself following her performance at the 1999 edition of the Los Juegos Deportivos Nacionales de San Carlos, translated as the National Sporting Games of San Carlos. She later played for local clubs AD Goicoechea, CS Desamparados, and UCEM Alajuela. With Alajuela, Cruz won three league titles and also earned the top scorer award once.

Due to her performances locally, she signed with UCEM Alajuela and, in January 2006, moved abroad signing with Division 1 Féminine club Olympique Lyonnais. Due to joining the club mid-season, Cruz appeared in only seven league matches scoring three goals. The 2006–07 season saw her playing time increase to 12 matches and also saw Lyon win their first league title under their new emblem. In the Challenge de France, Cruz was instrumental in helping Lyon reaching the final, where they lost to Montpellier on penalties scoring four goals in five appearances. The next season saw Lyon win the double following their league title and 3–0 victory over Paris Saint-Germain in the Challenge de France. Cruz appeared in 32 total matches, which included appearances in the UEFA Women's Cup.

Cruz appeared in all 22 league matches (starting 20) during the 2008–09 season, which saw Lyon win their third straight title. She also appeared in all seven UEFA Women's Cup matches, where Lyon suffered elimination in the semi-finals after losing 2–4 on aggregate to German club FCR 2001 Duisburg. On 18 September 2009, Cruz, for the first time, signed with Lyon under professional terms (previously contracts were semi-professional) after agreeing to a two-year contract, which will keep her at the club until 2011. Cruz got off to a quick start for the 2009–10 season scoring a hat trick in the opening league match against AS Montigny-le-Bretonneux, which ended in a 6–0 victory.

Cruz signed with Chinese Women's Super League team Jiangsu Suning in January 2018.

In March 2020, Cruz signed with OL Reign for the 2020 NWSL season, which due to the pandemic, was reformatted and condensed to shorter post tournament style competitions, the Challenge Cup and Fall Series. In December 2020, Cruz re-signed with Reign for the 2021 NWSL season. In December 2021, OL Reign waived the rights to Cruz and she left the club.

Cruz returned to Alajuelense in 2022 and captained the club to its third, fourth, and fifth championships in the 2022 Apertura and Clausura, and 2023 Apertura. After the last championship, Cruz suggested that it would be her last before retirement. She had previously stated her intent to retire from football after the 2023 FIFA Women's World Cup.

In the 2023 Apertura championship match's second leg on 3 June 2023, the team rallied from a 1–4 first-leg deficit against Sporting F.C. to win the title 5–4 on aggregate. After the match, Cruz told reporters that when Natalia Mills scored the series-winning fourth goal of the second leg, Mills told her, "Así se tiene que retirar" ("This is how (you) have to retire").

On June 8, 2023, after unexpectedly not being selected to the national team roster for the 2023 FIFA Women's World Cup, Cruz announced her retirement from football on social media.

== International career ==
Cruz has earned caps with the Costa Rican under-19 and under-20 women's teams. Her first appearance with the senior team occurred at the 2002 CONCACAF Women's Gold Cup, which served as a qualifying tournament for the 2003 FIFA Women's World Cup. Following a match in 2004 against Canada, in which she suffered a sprained right knee, Cruz did not feature with the national team for the next two years, due to commitments with her football club. In 2006, she made herself available for selection making her return to the team during qualification for the 2006 CONCACAF Women's Gold Cup.

Costa Rica qualified for its first ever FIFA Women's World Cup tournament and Cruz captained the team at the 2015 FIFA Women's World Cup in Canada, playing all three of Costa Rica's matches.

== Honors ==
San José FF

- First Women's Division of Costa Rica: 2000

UCEM Alajuela

- First Women's Division of Costa Rica: 2003, 2004

Lyon

- Division 1 Féminine (6): 2006–07, 2007–08, 2008–09, 2009–10, 2010–11, 2011–12
- Coupe de France Féminine (2): 2007–08, 2011–12
- UEFA Women's Champions League (2): 2010–11, 2011–12

Jiangsu Suning

- Chinese FA Cup: 2018
- Regional cup: 2018

Alajuelense FF

- Costa Rican Women's Premier Division: 2019, Apertura 2022, Clausura 2022, Apertura 2023
- UNCAF Women's Interclub Championship: 2022

Costa Rica

- Central American Games: 2013
- Pan American Games Bronze medal: 2019
- CONCACAF Women's Championship runner-up: 2014

Individual

- IFFHS CONCACAF Woman Team of the Decade 2011–2020
- CONCACAF Best XI: 2015, 2016
- CONCACAF Female Player of the Year second place: 2014
- CONCACAF Female Player of the Year third place: 2013, 2015

== See also ==
- List of women's footballers with 100 or more international caps
