= Óscar Ramírez (footballer, born 1964) =

Costa Rican footballer and manager

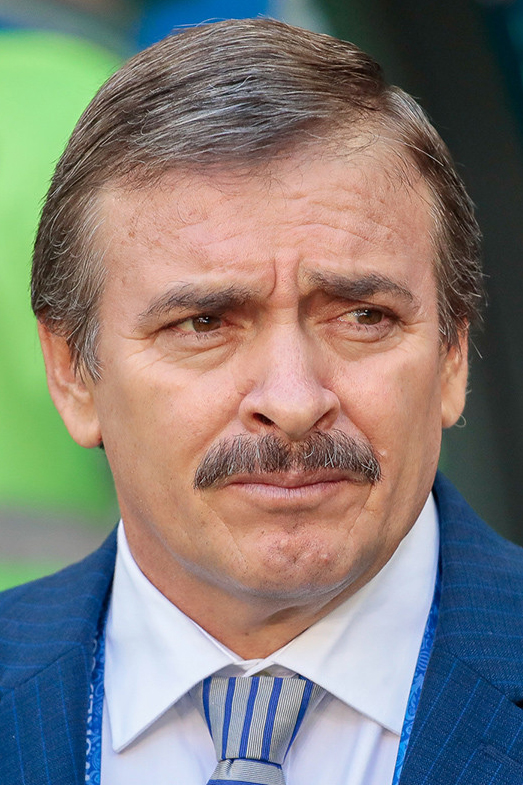
- Ramírez as Costa Rica manager at the 2018 FIFA World Cup

Personal information
- Full name: Óscar Antonio Ramírez Hernández
- Date of birth: 8 December 1964 (age 61)
- Place of birth: San Antonio de Belén, Costa Rica
- Height: 1.68 m (5 ft 6 in)
- Position: Midfielder

Team information
- Current team: Alajuelense (head coach)

Senior career*
Years	Team	Apps	(Gls)
1983–1993	Alajuelense		(31)
1993–1995	Saprissa		
1995–1997	Belén	74	(6)
1997–1999	Saprissa	167	(6)
1999–2000	Guanacasteca		
Total		557	(43)

International career
1985–1997	Costa Rica	75	(6)

Managerial career
- 2002: Belén
- 2006–2008: Costa Rica (assistant)
- 2008–2010: Santos de Guápiles
- 2010–2012: Alajuelense
- 2013–2015: Alajuelense
- 2015–2018: Costa Rica
- 2025–2026: Alajuelense
- 2026–: Alajuelense
- * Club domestic league appearances and goals

Óscar Antonio Ramírez Hernández (Spanish pronunciation: [ˈoskaɾ anˈtonjo raˈmiɾes eɾˈnandes]; born 8 December 1964), is a Costa Rican former footballer who played as a midfielder and is the manager of Alajuelense.

During the first half of the 2010s, he managed Alajuelense in two separate stints. Regarded as the most successful manager in the club's history, he won five league titles. Shortly after his second departure, he was appointed as the head coach of the Costa Rica national team.

Ramírez is also known for being one of the few coaches to continue using the sweeper position after its waning days in the early 2000s.

== Club career ==
He played for the two teams in his country, Alajuelense and Saprissa, becoming a star and an idol for both teams' fans. He made his debut for Liga on 13 November 1983 against Ramonense and scored his first goal a week later against Municipal San José. With Alajuelense he won four national championships during the 1980s and early 1990s, as well as a CONCACAF Champions Cup in 1986.

During the 1993's season, El Macho switched to Alajuela's arch-rival team Saprissa, causing a commotion among Liga's fans. With Saprissa, he won a total of three more national championships and two CONCACAF Champions Cup titles. In 1995, he moved to hometown club Belén but returned to Saprissa in 1997.

He retired in March 2000 when at second division Guanacasteca.

== International career ==
Ramírez made his debut for Costa Rica in a February 1985 friendly match against El Salvador and earned a total of 75 caps, scoring 6 goals. He represented his country in 21 FIFA World Cup qualification matches and played at the 1990 FIFA World Cup held in Italy. He also played at the 1991 and 1997 UNCAF Nations Cups as well as at the 1991 CONCACAF Gold Cup and the 1997 Copa América in Bolivia.

He collected his final cap in an August 1997 World Cup qualifier against El Salvador.

=== International goals ===
Scores and results list Costa Rica's goal tally first.

N.	Date	Venue	Opponent	Score	Result	Competition
1.	26 May 1985	Estadio Alejandro Morera Soto, Alajuela, Costa Rica	United States	1–0	1–1	1986 FIFA World Cup qualification
2.	18 July 1985	Estadio Ricardo Saprissa Aymá, San José, Costa Rica	Trinidad and Tobago		3–1	Friendly
3.	23 August 1992	Estadio Nacional de la Sabana, San José, Costa Rica	Panama	2–0	5–1	1994 FIFA World Cup qualification
4.	18 April 1997	Estadio Mateo Flores, Guatemala City, Guatemala	Nicaragua	2–0	5–1	1997 UNCAF Nations Cup
5.	18 April 1997	Estadio Mateo Flores, Guatemala City, Guatemala	Nicaragua	3–0	5–1	1997 UNCAF Nations Cup
6.	18 April 1997	Estadio Mateo Flores, Guatemala City, Guatemala	Nicaragua	5–0	5–1	1997 UNCAF Nations Cup

== Managerial career ==
After his retirement, Ramírez began working as Hernán Medford's assistant coach in Saprissa, winning in less than three years, a national championship, a UNCAF Cup title, and a CONCACAF Champions Cup title, thus earning a berth at the 2005 FIFA Club World Championship.

As of 28 October 2006, the Costa Rican Football Federation announced that Medford and his coaching staff would take charge of the Costa Rica national football team. Thus making him the new assistant coach for the Costa Rica national football team.

In May 2010, Ramírez took charge of Alajuelense, assisted by his former World Cup teammate Mauricio Montero. He was voted Costa Rica manager of the year 2012, but resigned in January 2013 only to return at the helm in May 2013.

In August 2015, Ramírez was appointed as Paulo Wanchope's assistant coach for the Costa Rica national team. However, a week after his appointment, Wanchope was involved in a fight in Panama and announced his departure from the national team. Ramírez was then appointed as head coach a week after. He led the team at the 2018 FIFA World Cup.

== Managerial statistics ==
As of match played 5 July 2018

=== Club ===
Managerial record by team and tenure
Team	Nat	From	To	Position	Record								Ref
Team	Nat	From	To	Position	G	W	D	L	GF	GA	GD	Win %	Ref
Santos de Guápiles	(Costa Rica)	21 February 2009	31 December 2009	Manager	16	5	6	5	14	18	−4	31.25	
Alajuelense	(Costa Rica)	1 July 2010	3 January 2013	Manager	125	73	27	25	216	138	+78	58.40	
Alajuelense	(Costa Rica)	1 July 2013	30 January 2015	Manager	124	67	26	31	203	114	+89	54.03	
Total					265	145	59	61	433	270	+163	54.72	—

=== International ===
Managerial record by team and tenure
Team	Nat	From	To	Position	Record								Ref
Team	Nat	From	To	Position	G	W	D	L	GF	GA	GD	Win %	Ref
Costa Rica	(Costa Rica)	28 October 2006	28 June 2008	Assistant Manager	—	−	−	−	−	−	—	—	
Costa Rica	(Costa Rica)	18 August 2015	5 July 2018	Manager	46	20	11	15	53	47	+6	43.48	
Total					46	20	11	15	53	47	+6	43.48	—

== Honours ==
=== Alajuelense ===
Ramirez is the most successful manager in the club's history winning five league titles and being Costa Rica manager of the year 2012.

- Primera División de Costa Rica: Invierno 2010–11
- Primera División de Costa Rica: Verano 2010–11
- Primera División de Costa Rica: Invierno 2011–12
- Primera División de Costa Rica: Invierno 2012–13
- Primera División de Costa Rica: Invierno 2013–14

=== Individual awards ===
- Costa Rica manager of the year 2012
- CONCACAF Coach of the Year: 2016

== Personal life ==
Ramírez is married to Jeannette Delgado, and they have four children.
