= Hernán Darío Gómez =

Colombian football manager (born 1956)

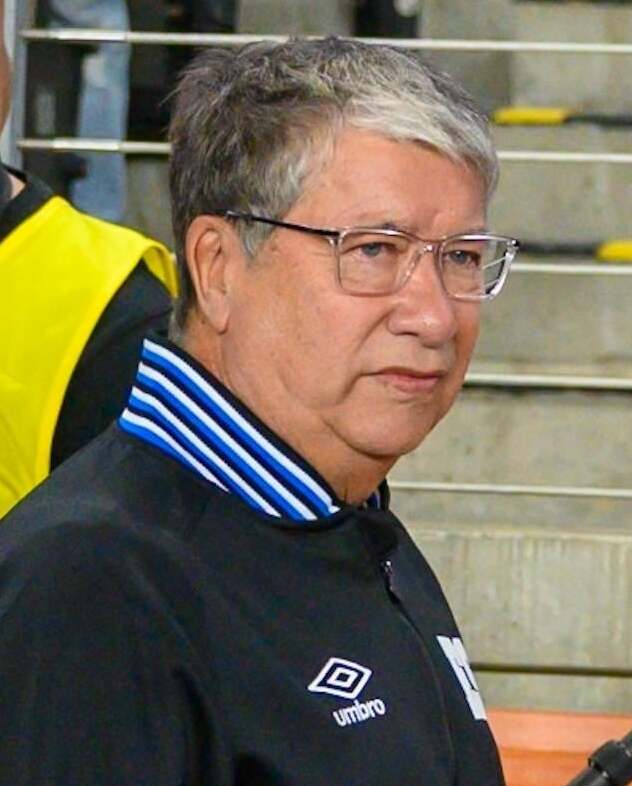
- Gómez as El Salvador manager in 2025

Personal information
- Full name: Hernán Darío Gómez Jaramillo
- Date of birth: 3 February 1956 (age 70)
- Place of birth: Medellín, Colombia
- Height: 1.67 m (5 ft 6 in)
- Position: Defensive midfielder

Team information
- Current team: El Salvador (manager)

Senior career*
| Years | Team | Apps | (Gls) |
| 1975–1980 | Independiente Medellín | 56 | (6) |
| 1980–1984 | Atlético Nacional | 31 | (1) |

Managerial career
- 1991–1993: Atlético Nacional
- 1995–1998: Colombia
- 1999–2004: Ecuador
- 2006–2008: Guatemala
- 2008–2009: Santa Fe
- 2010–2011: Colombia
- 2012–2013: Independiente Medellín
- 2014–2018: Panama
- 2018–2019: Ecuador
- 2020–2021: Independiente Medellín
- 2021–2022: Honduras
- 2023: Junior
- 2024: Águilas Doradas
- 2025–: El Salvador
- * Club domestic league appearances and goals

Hernán Darío Gómez Jaramillo (Spanish pronunciation: [eɾˈnan daˈɾi.o ˈɣomes xaɾaˈmiʝo]; born 3 February 1956), also known as El Bolillo (pronounced [el βoˈliʝo]; The Baton), is a Colombian football manager and former player who is the current manager of the El Salvador national team.

== Career ==
He was an active player from 1966 to 1985, when he retired after a knee injury. Gómez played for the Colombia amateur team that participated at the 1978 Central American and Caribbean Games. His career as a coach started while being assistant to Francisco Maturana while at Atlético Nacional and winning the 1989 Copa Libertadores. He would then become head coach in 1991 and led them to a Categoria Primera A title in 1991.

He joined Maturana while he became coach of Colombia and was his assistant at the 1987 Copa America where Colombia got third place. He also helped qualify the team to the 1990 FIFA World Cup and 1994 edition as well. This was during the so-called golden generation of Colombian football. In 1995, he was named head coach of Colombia and qualified them for the 1998 FIFA World Cup Colombia's fourth appearance overall and third consecutive appearance at the tournament. They went out at group stage with one win and two losses.

He successfully led Ecuador to their first World Cup finals in 2002. However, he resigned after a disappointing performance by the Ecuadorian team at the 2004 Copa América.

During the 2006 World Cup qualifiers, he was a commentator for Canal RCN.

On 5 May 2010, the Colombian Football Federation announced that Gómez was appointed as the successor of Eduardo Lara, who left the selection after failing to qualify for the 2010 FIFA World Cup finals.

On 13 February 2012, he took charge of Independiente Medellin, six months after resigning as coach of the national team.

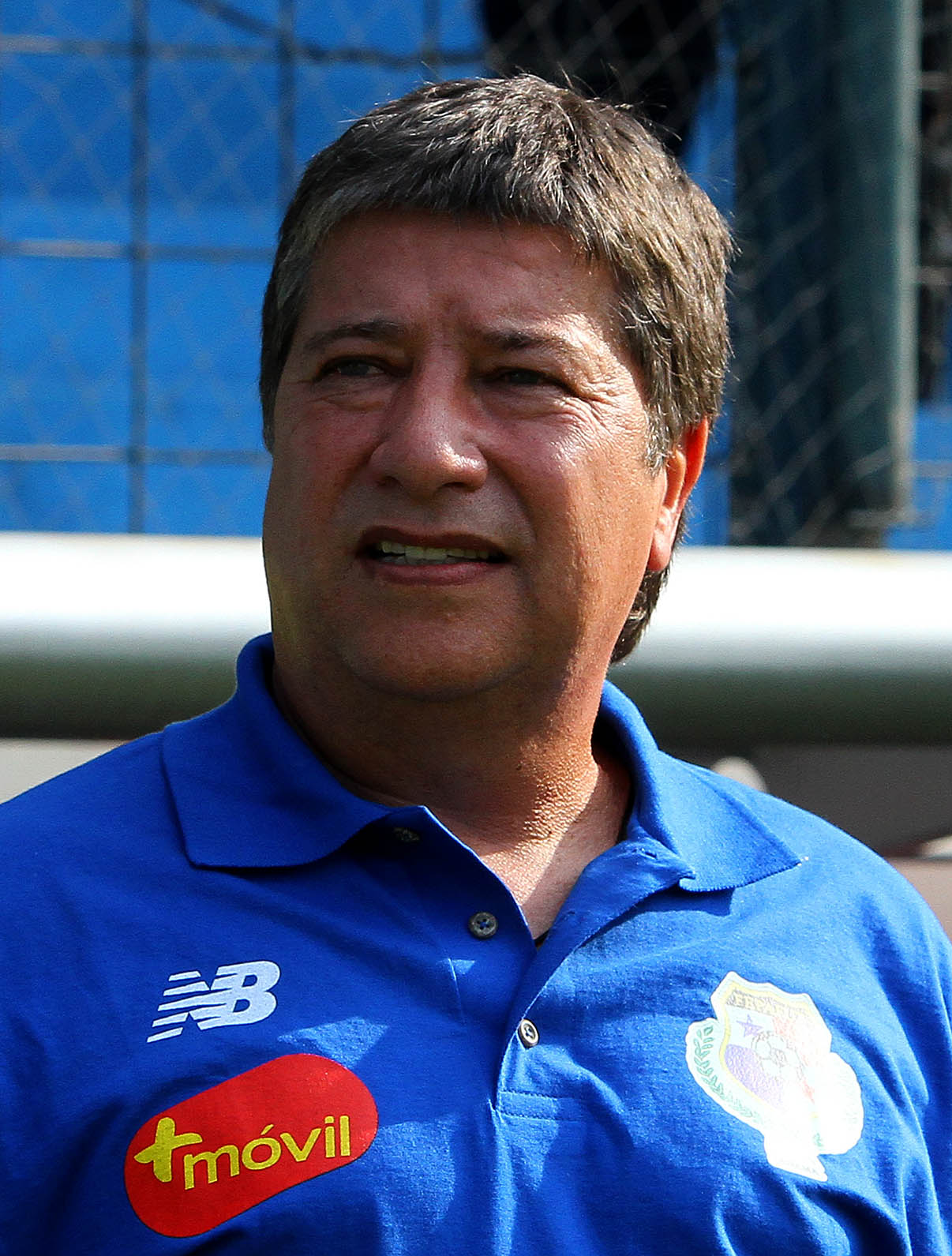
Gómez as Panama manager in 2015

On 15 February 2014, Gómez was announced the new manager of Panama. He led Panama to the semi-finals of the 2015 Gold Cup, where Panama were controversially eliminated by Mexico. After the match, he publicly criticized Mark Geiger's decisions, and went on to say that he "deeply thought of retiring" after that moment. Panama finished third after defeating the United States in the match for third place. On 22 January 2016, Gómez was named 2015 CONCACAF Men's Coach of the Year.

On 10 October 2017, he led Panama to qualify for the 2018 FIFA World Cup, the country's debut in this competition. On July 17, 2018 he stepped down as Panama's head coach. Gomez said an "emotional farewell".

On 1 August 2018, Gomez returned to Ecuador as head coach of the national team. Ecuador had a disastrous performance at the 2019 Copa America, where they only gained one point against Japan. After Ecuador's loss in the opening match against Uruguay, Gomez said to the press that at halftime, with Ecuador losing 3-0, he told his team in the dressing room, "There is nothing we can do, just make sure they don't score anymore goals on us." This statement was seen as disrespectful by the Ecuadorian press, and doubts were already raised over his management. After the tournament, Gomez stated that he would not resign, and his objective was to remain with the national team to coach the 2022 World Cup Qualifiers. However, on 1 August 2019, Gomez was dismissed.

In October 2021, Gomez was announced as the new head coach of the Honduras national team, replacing Fabián Coito. On 10 April 2022, Gomez was sacked from the Honduras national team after just nine games, losing eight and only drawing once. Honduras finished in last place of the octogonal with just three points.

On 16 November 2022, Gómez returned to his home country after being named manager of Atlético Bucaramanga for the 2023 season, but resigned fourteen days later, before officially taking over the club. On 15 March 2023, he was announced as the new manager of Colombian club Junior, which he coached until 17 August when he resigned following Junior's elimination from the 2023 Copa Colombia.

On 2 January 2024, Gómez was appointed as manager of Águilas Doradas, being officially presented by the club thirteen days later. On 28 March, two months after his signing, Gómez and the club reached an agreement for his departure after four wins, five draws and six losses.

== Personal life ==
On 6 August 2011, at the pub "El Bembe" in Bogotá, Gómez attacked an unidentified woman. According to witnesses, Gómez hit the woman at least four times near the entrance of the pub where he was accompanied by the woman minutes before. When the facts were known, Gómez released a statement asking for forgiveness for his behavior and resigned to his participation as a member of the technical committee of the U-20 World Football Championship. However multiple organizations, like 'Casa de la Mujer', expressed their discontent with Gómez's actions and asked for his resignation as manager of the Colombian football team. Finally because of pressure from the media, the Colombian football team's sponsors, political and social celebrities and the general public, he resigned as the manager of the Colombian football team.

== Managerial statistics ==
As of 17 November 2026

| Team | Nat | From | To | Record | | | | |
| Team | Nat | From | To | G | W | D | L | Win % |
|---|---|---|---|---|---|---|---|---|
| Atlético Nacional | (Colombia) | 1 July 1990 | 30 July 1994 | 262 | 113 | 81 | 68 | 43.13 |
| Colombia | (Colombia) | 31 January 1995 | 26 June 1998 | 58 | 21 | 18 | 19 | 36.21 |
| Ecuador | (Ecuador) | 1 October 1999 | 29 July 2004 | 66 | 24 | 18 | 24 | 36.36 |
| Guatemala | (Guatemala) | 1 January 2006 | 10 February 2008 | 21 | 5 | 4 | 12 | 23.81 |
| Santa Fe | (Colombia) | 1 July 2008 | 1 April 2009 | 33 | 14 | 10 | 9 | 42.42 |
| Colombia | (Colombia) | 5 May 2010 | 8 August 2011 | 15 | 5 | 5 | 5 | 33.33 |
| Independiente Medellín | (Colombia) | 13 February 2012 | 19 April 2013 | 67 | 23 | 18 | 26 | 34.33 |
| Panama | (Panama) | 15 February 2014 | 17 July 2018 | 71 | 22 | 21 | 28 | 30.99 |
| Ecuador | (Ecuador) | 1 August 2018 | 31 July 2019 | 13 | 4 | 4 | 5 | 30.77 |
| Independiente Medellín | (Colombia) | 1 January 2021 | 5 September 2021 | 33 | 10 | 16 | 7 | 30.30 |
| Honduras | (Honduras) | 16 October 2021 | 30 March 2022 | 9 | 0 | 1 | 8 | 0.00 |
| Junior | (Colombia) | 15 March 2023 | 17 August 2023 | 20 | 6 | 8 | 6 | 30.00 |
| Águilas Doradas | (Colombia) | 2 January 2024 | 28 March 2024 | 15 | 4 | 5 | 6 | 26.67 |
| El Salvador | (El Salvador) | 20 March 2025 | Present | 27 | 8 | 9 | 10 | 29.63 |
| Total | | | | 717 | 259 | 223 | 235 | 36.12 |

== World record as manager ==
To date, he is one of three coaches to have led at least three different national teams to a World Cup. He qualified Colombia to the 1998 FIFA World Cup, Ecuador to the 2002 FIFA World Cup and Panama to the 2018 FIFA World Cup. French manager Henri Michel also had previously achieved this with three teams: he led France to the 1986 FIFA World Cup, Morocco to the 1998 FIFA World Cup and Ivory Coast to the 2006 FIFA World Cup. Bora Milutinovic (Mexico, 1986; Costa Rica, 1990; United States, 1994; Nigeria, 1998; and China, 2002) and Carlos Alberto Parreira (Kuwait, 1982; United Arab Emirates, 1990; Brazil, 1994 and 2006; Saudi Arabia, 1998; South Africa, 2010) have guided five teams in World Cups, but without playing all the qualification rounds.

== See also ==
- National team managers with 100 or more matches
