= Roberto García Orozco =

Mexican football referee (born 1974)

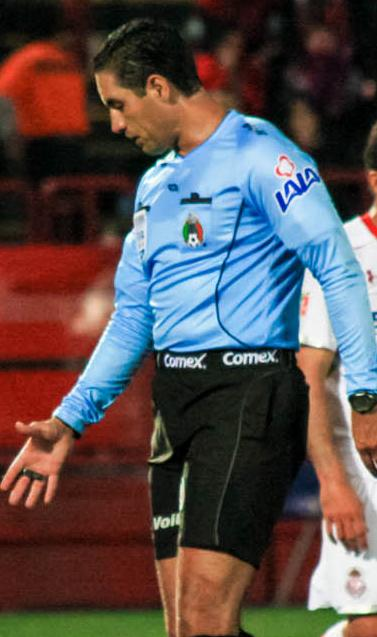
- Born: 24 October 1974 (age 51); Mexico City, Mexico

Domestic
Years	League	Role
2003–2019	Liga MX	Referee

International
Years	League	Role
2007–2019	FIFA listed	Referee

Roberto García Orozco (Spanish pronunciation: [roˈβeɾto ɣaɾˈsi.a oˈɾosko]; born 24 October 1974) is a Mexican former football referee. He has refereed at the 2014 and 2018 FIFA World Cup qualifiers.
