= 2019–20 Paris Saint-Germain FC season =

50th season in existence of Paris Saint-Germain

Paris Saint-Germain
2019–20 season
- Paris Saint-Germain players during a friendly match against Dynamo Dresden in July 2019
- President: Nasser Al-Khelaifi
- Head coach: Thomas Tuchel
- Stadium: Parc des Princes
- Ligue 1: 1st (awarded)
- Coupe de France: Winners
- Coupe de la Ligue: Winners
- Trophée des Champions: Winners
- UEFA Champions League: Runners-up
- Top goalscorer: League: Kylian Mbappé (18); All: Kylian Mbappé (30)
- Highest home attendance: 47,926 (vs. Marseille – 27 October 2019)
- Lowest home attendance: 46,361 (vs. Real Madrid – 18 September 2019)
- Average home league attendance: 47,554
- Biggest win: 6–0 (vs. Linas-Montlhéry – 5 January 2020)
- Biggest defeat: 0–2 (vs. Reims – 25 September 2019)
Home colours	Away colours	Third colours

The 2019–20 season was Paris Saint-Germain Football Club's 47th professional season since its creation in 1970, and its 46th consecutive season in the top-flight of French football. It was their 50th season in existence.

On 30 April 2020, Paris Saint-Germain were awarded the championship based on PPG ratio following the early cancellation of the 2019–20 season due to the COVID-19 pandemic. They subsequently claimed both national cups to achieve a domestic treble. Furthermore, the team then qualified for its first-ever Champions League final, hoping to win its first European trophy since 1996. However, they were defeated by Bayern Munich 1–0.

== Players ==
French teams were limited to four players without EU citizenship. Hence, the squad list includes only the principal nationality of each player; several non-European players on the squad had dual citizenship with an EU country. Also, players from the ACP countries—countries in Africa, the Caribbean, and the Pacific that were signatories to the Cotonou Agreement—are not counted against non-EU quotas due to the Kolpak ruling.

=== Squad ===
As of 22 September 2019

Note: Flags indicate national team as defined under FIFA eligibility rules; some limited exceptions apply. Players may hold more than one non-FIFA nationality.

No.	Pos.	Nation	Player
1	GK	CRC	Keylor Navas
2	DF	BRA	Thiago Silva (captain)
3	DF	FRA	Presnel Kimpembe
4	DF	GER	Thilo Kehrer
5	DF	BRA	Marquinhos (vice-captain)
6	MF	ITA	Marco Verratti
7	FW	FRA	Kylian Mbappé
8	MF	ARG	Leandro Paredes
9	FW	URU	Edinson Cavani
10	FW	BRA	Neymar
11	MF	ARG	Ángel Di María
12	DF	BEL	Thomas Meunier
14	DF	ESP	Juan Bernat
16	GK	ESP	Sergio Rico (on loan from Sevilla)
17	FW	CMR	Eric Maxim Choupo-Moting

No.	Pos.	Nation	Player
18	FW	ARG	Mauro Icardi
19	MF	ESP	Pablo Sarabia
20	DF	FRA	Layvin Kurzawa
21	MF	ESP	Ander Herrera
22	DF	SEN	Abdou Diallo
23	MF	GER	Julian Draxler
25	DF	NED	Mitchel Bakker
27	MF	SEN	Idrissa Gueye
30	GK	POL	Marcin Bułka
31	DF	FRA	Colin Dagba
35	DF	FRA	Tanguy Kouassi
36	DF	FRA	Loïc Mbe Soh
38	MF	FRA	Adil Aouchiche
40	GK	FRA	Garissone Innocent

== Transfers ==
=== In ===
No.	Pos	Player	Transferred from	Fee	Date	Source
21	MF	(Spain) Ander Herrera	Unattached	Free	4 July 2019	
19	MF	(Spain) Pablo Sarabia	(Spain) Sevilla	€19.5m	5 July 2019	
30	GK	(Poland) Marcin Bułka	Unattached	Free	6 July 2019	
25	DF	(Netherlands) Mitchel Bakker	Unattached	Free	7 July 2019	
22	DF	(France) Abdou Diallo	(Germany) Borussia Dortmund	€32m	16 July 2019	
27	MF	(Senegal) Idrissa Gueye	(England) Everton	€30m	30 July 2019	
16	GK	(Spain) Sergio Rico	(Spain) Sevilla	Loan (Note: Includes an option to sign permanently for €12m.)	1 September 2019	
1	GK	(Costa Rica) Keylor Navas	(Spain) Real Madrid	€13m	2 September 2019	
18	FW	(Argentina) Mauro Icardi	(Italy) Inter	Loan (Note: Includes an option to sign permanently for €70m.)	2 September 2019	
18	FW	(Argentina) Mauro Icardi	(Italy) Inter Milan	€50m (Note: Up to €7m in add-ons)	1 July 2020 (Note: Transfer officially completed during the 2019–20 season as the 2019–20 UEFA Champions League knockout phase was delayed due to the COVID-19 pandemic)	

=== Out ===
Pos	Player	Transferred To	Fee	Date	Source
MF	(France) Adrien Rabiot	(Italy) Juventus	Free	1 July 2019	
GK	(Italy) Gianluigi Buffon	Released (Note: On 4 July 2019, Buffon signed for Juventus.)	Free	1 July 2019	
DF	(Brazil) Dani Alves	Released (Note: On 1 August 2019, Alves signed for São Paulo.)	Free	1 July 2019	
FW	(France) Moussa Diaby	(Germany) Bayer Leverkusen	€15m	1 July 2019	
MF	(France) Gaëtan Robail	(France) Lens	€1m	1 July 2019	
FW	(United States) Timothy Weah	(France) Lille	€10m	1 July 2019	
MF	(Argentina) Giovani Lo Celso	(Spain) Real Betis	€21m	1 July 2019	
MF	(Poland) Grzegorz Krychowiak	(Russia) Lokomotiv Moscow	€12m	1 July 2019	
MF	(France) Christopher Nkunku	(Germany) RB Leipzig	€15m	18 July 2019	
GK	(Germany) Kevin Trapp	(Germany) Eintracht Frankfurt	€10m	7 August 2019	
GK	(France) Rémy Descamps	(Belgium) Charleroi	€400k	8 August 2019	
DF	(French Guiana) Kévin Rimane	(Romania) Hermannstadt	Free	20 August 2019	
MF	(France) Samuel Essende	(France) Avranches	Free	22 August 2019	
DF	(France) Arthur Zagré	(France) Monaco	€10m	29 August 2019	
DF	(France) Stanley Nsoki	(France) Nice	€12m	31 August 2019	
FW	(Turkey) Metehan Güçlü	(France) Rennes	€1.5m	31 August 2019	
GK	(France) Alphonse Areola	(Spain) Real Madrid	Loan	2 September 2019	
FW	(Spain) Jesé	(Portugal) Sporting CP	Loan (Note: Includes an option to sign permanently.)	2 September 2019	
GK	(France) Sébastien Cibois	Released	Free	3 September 2019	
DF	(France) Alec Georgen	(France) Avranches	Free	3 September 2019	
DF	(France) Moussa Sissako	(Belgium) Standard Liège	Loan (Note: Includes an option to sign permanently for €400k.)	28 January 2020	
DF	(France) Moussa Sissako	(Belgium) Standard Liège	€400k	11 June 2020	
DF	(Belgium) Thomas Meunier	(Germany) Borussia Dortmund	Free	1 July 2020	
DF	(France) Tanguy Nianzou	(Germany) Bayern Munich	Free	1 July 2020	
MF	(France) Adil Aouchiche	Released (Note: On 20 July 2020, Aouchiche signed for Saint-Étienne.)	Free	1 July 2020	
FW	(Uruguay) Edinson Cavani	Released (Note: On 5 October 2020, Cavani signed for Manchester United.)	Free	1 July 2020	
MF	(France) Éric Junior Dina Ebimbe	(France) Dijon (Note: Includes an option to sign permanently.)	Loan	6 July 2020	

== Kits ==
Home	Home alt.	Away	Third; European home	Fourth	2018–19 Away vs Rennes (18 Aug 2019) vs Metz (30 Aug 2019)

== Pre-season and friendlies ==
16 July 2019 Friendly	Dynamo Dresden	1–6	Paris Saint-Germain	Dresden
20:20 CEST (UTC+2)	Koné 76' (pen.)	Report	Mbappé 6', 34'; Draxler 18'; Zagre 48'; Postolachi 61'; Aouchiche 71'; Arday (yellow card) 86'	Stadium: Rudolf-Harbig-Stadion; Attendance: 30,003; Referee: Nicolas Winter (Germany)

20 July 2019 Friendly	1. FC Nürnberg	1–1	Paris Saint-Germain	Nuremberg
18:30 CEST (UTC+2)	Valentini 71' (pen.)	Report	Sarabia 43'; Bakker (yellow card) 89'	Stadium: Max-Morlock-Stadion; Attendance: 30,252

27 July 2019 Friendly	Paris Saint-Germain	1–1 (5–6 p)	Inter Milan	Macau
13:30 CEST (UTC+2)	Kehrer 41'; Kurzawa (yellow card) 49'	Report	Longo 90+4'	Stadium: Macau Olympic Sports Centre; Referee: Fu Ming (China)
	Penalties
	Cavani (penalty scored); Jesé (penalty scored); Diallo (penalty scored); Aouchiche (penalty missed); Arday (penalty scored); Mbe Soh (penalty scored); Zagre (penalty missed)		(penalty scored) Ranocchia; (penalty scored) Gagliardini; (penalty scored) Colidio; (penalty scored) Agoumé; (penalty missed) Candreva; (penalty scored) Longo; (penalty scored) João Mário

30 July 2019 Friendly	Paris Saint-Germain	3–0	Sydney FC	Suzhou
14:00 CEST (UTC+2)	Kouassi (yellow card) 30'; Mbappé 37'; Cavani 43'; Güçlü 89'	Report	Van Der Saag (yellow card) 19'	Stadium: Suzhou Olympic Sports Centre

12 July 2020 Friendly	Le Havre	0–9	Paris Saint-Germain	Le Havre
19:00 CEST (UTC+2)	Casimir (yellow card) 27'	Report	Icardi 8', 19'; Neymar 21', 43' (pen.); Mbappé 29'; Gueye 50'; Sarabia 52', 60'; Kalimuendo 59'	Stadium: Stade Océane; Attendance: 5,000; Referee: Mikael Lesage (France)

17 July 2020 Friendly	Paris Saint-Germain	7–0	Waasland-Beveren	Paris
19:00 CEST (UTC+2)	Vukotić 21' (o.g.); Neymar 28' (pen.); Di María (yellow card) 43'; Icardi 47'; Mbappé 60'; Choupo-Moting 65', 67'; Mbe Soh 93'	Report	Caufriez (yellow card) 27'; Vukotić (red card) 47'	Stadium: Parc des Princes; Attendance: 3,000; Referee: Stéphanie Frappart (France)
Note: Match was played in four 30-minute quarters.

21 July 2020 Friendly	Paris Saint-Germain	4–0	Celtic	Paris
19:00 CEST (UTC+2)	Mbappé 1'; Neymar 25'; Herrera 48'; Sarabia 67'	Report		Stadium: Parc des Princes; Attendance: 5,000; Referee: Nicolas Rainville (France)

5 August 2020 Friendly	Paris Saint-Germain	1–0	Sochaux	Paris
19:00 CEST (UTC+2)	Choupo-Moting 15'; Sarabia (yellow card) 39'	Report		Stadium: Parc des Princes; Attendance: 0 Referee: Bastien Dechepy (France)
Note: Match was played in two 40-minutes halves.

== Competitions ==
=== Overview ===
Competition	First match	Last match	Starting round	Final position	Record							
Competition	First match	Last match	Starting round	Final position	Pld	W	D	L	GF	GA	GD	Win %
Ligue 1	11 August 2019	29 February 2020	Matchday 1	Winners	27	22	2	3	75	24	+51	81.48
Coupe de France	5 January 2020	24 July 2020	Round of 64	Winners	6	6	0	0	21	2	+19	100.00
Coupe de la Ligue	18 December 2019	31 July 2020	Round of 16	Winners	4	3	1	0	13	2	+11	75.00
Trophée des Champions	3 August 2019		Final	Winners	1	1	0	0	2	1	+1	100.00
UEFA Champions League	18 September 2019	23 August 2020	Group stage	Runners-up	11	8	1	2	25	6	+19	72.73
Total					49	40	4	5	136	35	+101	81.63

Source: Competitions

=== Trophée des Champions ===
3 August 2019 Final	Paris Saint-Germain	2–1	Rennes	Shenzhen
13:30 CEST (UTC+2)	Meunier (yellow card) 7'; Bernat (yellow card) 23'; Mbappé 57', (yellow card) 90+3'; Di María 73', (yellow card) 74'; Sarabia (yellow card) 90'	Report	Hunou 13'; Bourigeaud (yellow card) 45+2'; Lea Siliki (yellow card) 72'	Stadium: Shenzhen Universiade Sports Centre; Attendance: 22,045; Referee: Benoît Bastien

=== Ligue 1 ===
==== League table ====
Pos	Team	Pld	W	D	L	GF	GA	GD	Pts	PPG	Qualification or relegation
1	Paris Saint-Germain (C)	27	22	2	3	75	24	+51	68	2.52	Qualification for the Champions League group stage
2	Marseille	28	16	8	4	41	29	+12	56	2.00	Qualification for the Champions League group stage
3	Rennes	28	15	5	8	38	24	+14	50	1.79	Qualification for the Champions League group stage
4	Lille	28	15	4	9	35	27	+8	49	1.75	Qualification for the Europa League group stage (Note: Since the winners of the Coupe de France and the Coupe de la Ligue, Paris Saint-Germain, qualified for the Champions League, the spot given to the Coupe de France winners (Europa League group stage) was passed to the fifth-placed team and the spot given to the Coupe de la Ligue winners (Europa League second qualifying round) was passed to the sixth-placed team.)
5	Nice	28	11	8	9	41	38	+3	41 (Note: Nice finished ahead of Reims on head-to-head points: Nice 2–0 Reims, Reims 1–1 Nice.)	1.46	Qualification for the Europa League group stage

Source: Ligue 1
Rules for classification: 1) Points per game; 2) Head-to-head points; 3) Head-to-head goal difference; 4) Goal difference; 5) Goals scored; 6) Fairplay ranking.
(C) Champions

==== Results summary ====
Overall								Home						Away					
Pld	W	D	L	GF	GA	GD	Pts	W	D	L	GF	GA	GD	W	D	L	GF	GA	GD
27	22	2	3	75	24	+51	68	12	1	1	44	11	+33	10	1	2	31	13	+18

Source: Ligue 1

==== Results by round ====
Round	1	2	3	4	5	6	7	8	9	10	11	12	13	14	15	16	17	18	19	20	21	22	23	24	25	26	27	28	29	30	31	32	33	34	35	36	37	38
Ground	H	A	H	A	H	A	H	A	H	A	H	A	A	H	H	A	A	H	H	A	A	H	A	H	A	H	H	A	H	A	H	A	H	A	H	A	H	A
Result	W	L	W	W	W	W	L	W	W	W	W	L	W	W	W	W	W	W	D	W	W	W	W	W	D	W	W	C	C	C	C	C	C	C	C	C	C	C
Position	2	8	3	1	1	1	1	1	1	1	1	1	1	1	1	1	1	1	1	1	1	1	1	1	1	1	1	1	1	1	1	1	1	1	1	1	1	1

Source: Matches
A = Away; H = Home; W = Win; D = Draw; L = Loss; C = Cancelled

==== Matches ====
The Ligue 1 schedule was announced on 14 June 2019. The Ligue 1 matches were suspended by the LFP on 13 March 2020 owing to COVID-19 until further notices. On 28 April 2020, it was announced that Ligue 1 and Ligue 2 campaigns would not resume, after the country banned all sporting events until September. On 30 April, The LFP ended officially the 2019–20 season.

11 August 2019 1	Paris Saint-Germain	3–0	Nîmes	Paris
21:00 CEST (UTC+2)	Cavani 24' (pen.); Verratti (yellow card) 45+1'; Mbappé 56'; Draxler (yellow card) 61'; Di María 69'	Report		Stadium: Parc des Princes; Attendance: 47,151; Referee: Clément Turpin

18 August 2019 2	Rennes	2–1	Paris Saint-Germain	Rennes
21:00 CEST (UTC+2)	Niang 44'; Del Castillo 48'; Siebatcheu (yellow card) 85'	Report	Cavani 36', (yellow card) 88'; Draxler (yellow card) 42'; Meunier (yellow card) 54'; Verratti (yellow card) 58'; Bernat (yellow card) 67'	Stadium: Roazhon Park; Attendance: 28,596; Referee: Antony Gautier

25 August 2019 3	Paris Saint-Germain	4–0	Toulouse	Paris
21:00 CEST (UTC+2)	Choupo-Moting 50', 75'; Gonçalves 55' (o.g.); Marquinhos 83'	Report	Sangaré (yellow card) 56'	Stadium: Parc des Princes; Attendance: 47,325; Referee: Jérôme Brisard

30 August 2019 4	Metz	0–2	Paris Saint-Germain	Metz
20:45 CEST (UTC+2)	Fofana (yellow card) 27'	Report	Di María 11' (pen.); Choupo-Moting 44'	Stadium: Stade Saint-Symphorien; Attendance: 20,685; Referee: Frank Schneider

14 September 2019 5	Paris Saint-Germain	1–0	Strasbourg	Paris
17:30 CEST (UTC+2)	Kurzawa (yellow card) 45+3'; Neymar 90+2'; Verratti (yellow card) 90+4'	Report	Bellegarde (yellow card) 45'; Ajorque (yellow card) 71'	Stadium: Parc des Princes; Attendance: 47,505; Referee: Amaury Delerue

22 September 2019 6	Lyon	0–1	Paris Saint-Germain	Décines-Charpieu
21:00 CEST (UTC+2)	Koné (yellow card) 76'	Report	Diallo (yellow card) 33'; Neymar 88'	Stadium: Groupama Stadium; Attendance: 54,583; Referee: Ruddy Buquet

25 September 2019 7	Paris Saint-Germain	0–2	Reims	Paris
21:00 CEST (UTC+2)	Bernat (yellow card) 45+3'	Report	Kamara 29'; Donis (yellow card) 40'; Rajković (yellow card) 83'; Dia 90+4'	Stadium: Parc des Princes; Attendance: 47,376; Referee: François Letexier

28 September 2019 8	Bordeaux	0–1	Paris Saint-Germain	Bordeaux
17:30 CEST (UTC+2)		Report	Marquinhos (yellow card) 30'; Neymar 70'; Di María (yellow card) 72'; Verratti (yellow card) 90+2'	Stadium: Matmut Atlantique; Attendance: 39,215; Referee: Jérôme Brisard

5 October 2019 9	Paris Saint-Germain	4–0	Angers	Paris
17:30 CEST (UTC+2)	Sarabia 13', (yellow card) 23'; Icardi 37'; Gueye 59'; Neymar (yellow card) 82', (goal) 90'; Paredes (yellow card) 86'	Report	Pereira Lage (yellow card) 53'	Stadium: Parc des Princes; Attendance: 47,700; Referee: Willy Delajod

18 October 2019 10	Nice	1–4	Paris Saint-Germain	Nice
20:45 CEST (UTC+2)	Cyprien (yellow card) 24' (yellow-red card) 74'; Ganago 67'; Hérelle (red card) 77'; Dante (yellow card) 90+3'	Report	Di María 15', 21'; Kurzawa (yellow card) 72'; Kimpembe (yellow card) 86'; Mbappé 88'; Icardi 90+2'	Stadium: Allianz Riviera; Attendance: 32,705; Referee: François Letexier

27 October 2019 11	Paris Saint-Germain	4–0	Marseille	Paris
21:00 CET (UTC+1)	Icardi 10', 26'; Mbappé 32', 44'; Dagba (yellow card) 39'; Bernat (yellow card) 59'	Report	Sakai (yellow card) 62'	Stadium: Parc des Princes; Attendance: 47,926; Referee: Benoît Bastien

1 November 2019 12	Dijon	2–1	Paris Saint-Germain	Dijon
20:45 CET (UTC+1)	Ndong (yellow card) 12'; Cádiz (yellow card) 14', (goal) 47'; Chouiar 45+6'; Mendyl (yellow card) 58'	Report	Kimpembe (yellow card) 15'; Mbappé 19'; Draxler (yellow card) 90+2'	Stadium: Stade Gaston Gérard; Attendance: 14,859; Referee: Ruddy Buquet

9 November 2019 13	Brest	1–2	Paris Saint-Germain	Brest
17:30 CET (UTC+1)	Grandsir 72'; Court (yellow card) 90+5'	Report	Di María 39'; Draxler (yellow card) 74'; Icardi 85'; Diallo (yellow card) 90+1'	Stadium: Stade Francis-Le Blé; Attendance: 15,144; Referee: Mikael Lesage

22 November 2019 14	Paris Saint-Germain	2–0	Lille	Paris
20:45 CET (UTC+1)	Icardi 17'; Kimpembe (yellow card) 20'; Meunier (yellow card) 30'; Di María 31'	Report		Stadium: Parc des Princes; Attendance: 47,476; Referee: Willy Delajod

4 December 2019 16	Paris Saint-Germain	2–0	Nantes	Paris
21:05 CET (UTC+1)	Draxler (yellow card) 34'; Mbappé 52'; Neymar 85' (pen.)	Report	Abeid (yellow card) 29'; Bamba (yellow card) 39'	Stadium: Parc des Princes; Attendance: 47,485; Referee: Amaury Delerue

7 December 2019 17	Montpellier	1–3	Paris Saint-Germain	Montpellier
17:30 CET (UTC+1)	Mendes (yellow card) 5' (yellow-red card) 73'; Paredes 41' (o.g.); Oyongo (yellow card) 45+3'; Chotard (yellow card) 79'; Souquet (yellow card) 85'	Report	Diallo (yellow card) 42'; Bernat (yellow card) 59'; Neymar 74'; Mbappé 76'; Icardi 81'; Thiago Silva (yellow card) 83'	Stadium: Stade de la Mosson; Attendance: 20,197; Referee: Antony Gautier

15 December 2019 18	Saint-Étienne	0–4	Paris Saint-Germain	Saint-Étienne
21:00 CET (UTC+1)	Trauco (yellow card) 20'; Aholou (red card) 25'	Report	Neymar 9'; Diallo (yellow card) 40'; Mbappé 43', 89'; Icardi 72'	Stadium: Stade Geoffroy-Guichard; Attendance: 36,391; Referee: Ruddy Buquet

21 December 2019 19	Paris Saint-Germain	4–1	Amiens	Paris
20:45 CET (UTC+1)	Mbappé 10', 65'; Neymar 46'; Icardi 84'	Report	Gnahoré (yellow card) 28'; Mendoza 70'	Stadium: Parc des Princes; Attendance: 47,693; Referee: Eric Wattellier

12 January 2020 20	Paris Saint-Germain	3–3	Monaco	Paris
21:00 CET (UTC+1)	Neymar 3', 42' (pen.); Ballo-Touré 24' (o.g.)	Report	Martins 7'; Keita (yellow card) 10'; Ben Yedder 13'; Slimani 70'; Bakayoko (yellow card) 84'; Ballo-Touré (yellow card) 88'	Stadium: Parc des Princes; Attendance: 47,580; Referee: Antony Gautier

15 January 2020 15	Monaco	1–4	Paris Saint-Germain	Monaco
21:00 CET (UTC+1)	Glik (yellow card) 45'; Bakayoko (yellow card) 81', (goal) 87'	Report	Mbappé 24', 90+1'; Neymar 45+2' (pen.); Kouassi (yellow card) 68'; Sarabia 72'; Kurzawa (yellow card) 86'	Stadium: Stade Louis II; Attendance: 11,214; Referee: François Letexier
Note: Match originally scheduled for 1 December 2019, but postponed due to adverse weather conditions, and rearranged for 15 January 2020.

26 January 2020 21	Lille	0–2	Paris Saint-Germain	Villeneuve-d'Ascq
21:00 CET (UTC+1)	Mandava (yellow card) 10'; André (yellow card) 38'; Gabriel (yellow card) 51'	Report	Neymar 28', 52' (pen.); Gueye (yellow card) 81'	Stadium: Stade Pierre-Mauroy; Attendance: 49,132; Referee: Amaury Delerue

1 February 2020 22	Paris Saint-Germain	5–0	Montpellier	Paris
17:30 CET (UTC+1)	Sarabia 8'; Kimpembe (yellow card) 33'; Neymar (yellow card) 38'; Di María 41'; Congré 44' (o.g.); Mbappé 57'; Kurzawa 65'; Paredes (yellow card) 84'	Report	Bertaud (red card) 17'; Mollet (yellow card) 39'; Chotard (yellow card) 81' (yellow-red card) 88'; Souquet (yellow card) 86'	Stadium: Parc des Princes; Attendance: 47,701; Referee: Jérôme Brisard

4 February 2020 23	Nantes	1–2	Paris Saint-Germain	Nantes
21:05 CET (UTC+1)	Simon 68'; Traoré (yellow card) 85'	Report	Icardi 29'; Verratti (yellow card) 36'; Kehrer 57'; Meunier (yellow card) 76'; Di María (yellow card) 90'; Kurzawa (yellow card) 90+2'	Stadium: Stade de la Beaujoire; Attendance: 34,307; Referee: Frank Schneider

9 February 2020 24	Paris Saint-Germain	4–2	Lyon	Paris
21:00 CET (UTC+1)	Di María 22'; Mbappé 38'; Kimpembe (yellow card) 45+1'; Marçal 47' (o.g.); Cavani 79'	Report	Terrier 52'; Dembélé 59'; Toko Ekambi (yellow card) 90'; Marcelo (yellow card) 90+2'	Stadium: Parc des Princes; Attendance: 47,529; Referee: Clément Turpin

15 February 2020 25	Amiens	4–4	Paris Saint-Germain	Amiens
17:30 CET (UTC+1)	Guirassy 5', 90+1', (yellow card) 90+2'; Kakuta 29', (yellow card) 81'; Diabaté 40'; Blin (yellow card) 71'	Report	Herrera 45'; Bakker (yellow card) 49'; Kouassi 60', 65'; Icardi 74'; Verratti (yellow card) 90+2'	Stadium: Stade de la Licorne; Attendance: 12,000; Referee: Hakim Ben El Hadj

23 February 2020 26	Paris Saint-Germain	4–3	Bordeaux	Paris
21:00 CET (UTC+1)	Cavani 25', (yellow card) 45+6'; Marquinhos 45+1', 63'; Neymar (yellow card) 45+6' (yellow-red card) 90+3'; Gueye (yellow card) 56'; Mbappé 69'; Kimpembe (yellow card) 85'	Report	Hwang 18'; Kwateng (yellow card) 45+1'; Pablo 45+5'; Bašić (yellow card) 64'; Pardo 83'	Stadium: Parc des Princes; Attendance: 47,771; Referee: Willy Delajod

29 February 2020 27	Paris Saint-Germain	4–0	Dijon	Paris
17:30 CET (UTC+1)	Sarabia 3'; Bernat (yellow card) 16'; Mbappé 74', 90+1'; Icardi 76'	Report		Stadium: Parc des Princes; Attendance: 47,542; Referee: Thomas Léonard

28	Strasbourg	Cancelled	Paris Saint-Germain	Strasbourg
--:-- CEST (UTC+2)				Stadium: Stade de la Meinau

29	Paris Saint-Germain	Cancelled	Nice	Paris
--:-- CEST (UTC+2)				Stadium: Parc des Princes

30	Marseille	Cancelled	Paris Saint-Germain	Marseille
--:-- CEST (UTC+2)				Stadium: Orange Vélodrome

31	Paris Saint-Germain	Cancelled	Metz	Paris
--:-- CEST (UTC+2)				Stadium: Parc des Princes

32	Angers	Cancelled	Paris Saint-Germain	Angers
--:-- CEST (UTC+2)				Stadium: Stade Raymond Kopa

33	Paris Saint-Germain	Cancelled	Saint-Étienne	Paris
--:-- CEST (UTC+2)				Stadium: Parc des Princes

34	Reims	Cancelled	Paris Saint-Germain	Reims
--:-- CEST (UTC+2)				Stadium: Stade Auguste-Delaune

35	Paris Saint-Germain	Cancelled	Brest	Paris
--:-- CEST (UTC+2)				Stadium: Parc des Princes

36	Toulouse	Cancelled	Paris Saint-Germain	Toulouse
--:-- CEST (UTC+2)				Stadium: Stadium de Toulouse

37	Paris Saint-Germain	Cancelled	Rennes	Paris
--:-- CEST (UTC+2)				Stadium: Parc des Princes

38	Nîmes	Cancelled	Paris Saint-Germain	Nîmes
--:-- CEST (UTC+2)				Stadium: Stade des Costières

=== Coupe de France ===
5 January 2020 Round of 64	Linas-Montlhéry	0–6	Paris Saint-Germain	Bondoufle
20:55 CET (UTC+1)		Report	Aouchiche 30'; Cavani 40', 60'; Sarabia 63', 68'; Choupo-Moting 87'	Stadium: Stade Robert Bobin; Attendance: 14,987; Referee: Frank Schneider

19 January 2020 Round of 32	Lorient	0–1	Paris Saint-Germain	Lorient
20:55 CET (UTC+1)		Report	Paredes (yellow card) 64'; Sarabia 80'	Stadium: Stade du Moustoir; Attendance: 14,000; Referee: Karim Abed

29 January 2020 Round of 16	Pau FC	0–2	Paris Saint-Germain	Pau
18:30 CET (UTC+1)	Bayard (yellow card) 51'	Report	Paredes 25', (yellow card) 42'; Sarabia 53'	Stadium: Stade du Hameau; Attendance: 16,707; Referee: Florent Batta

12 February 2020 Quarter-finals	Dijon	1–6	Paris Saint-Germain	Dijon
18:30 CET (UTC+1)	Chouiar 13'	Report	Lautoa 1' (o.g.); Mbappé 44'; Thiago Silva 50'; Sarabia 56', 90+1'; Coulibaly 86' (o.g.)	Stadium: Stade Gaston Gérard; Attendance: 14,193; Referee: Benoît Bastien

4 March 2020 Semi-finals	Lyon	1–5	Paris Saint-Germain	Décines-Charpieu
21:10 CET (UTC+1)	Terrier 11'; Marçal (yellow card) 36' (yellow-red card) 61'; Dubois (yellow card) 66'	Report	Mbappé 14', 70', 90+2', (yellow card) 64'; Kurzawa (yellow card) 30'; Meunier (yellow card) 55'; Neymar 64' (pen.), (yellow card) 85'; Sarabia 82'	Stadium: Groupama Stadium; Attendance: 42,500; Referee: Ruddy Buquet

24 July 2020 Final	Paris Saint-Germain	1–0	Saint-Étienne	Saint-Denis
21:10 CEST (UTC+2)	Neymar 14'; Bakker (yellow card) 29'; Paredes (yellow card) 29'; Verratti (yellow card) 31'; Marquinhos (yellow card) 35'	Report	Maçon (yellow card) 2'; Moulin (yellow card) 29'; Hamouma (yellow card) 29'; Perrin (red card) 31'; Camara (yellow card) 37'; M'Vila (yellow card) 51'; Fofana (yellow card) 90'	Stadium: Stade de France; Attendance: 2,805; Referee: Amaury Delerue
Note: Match originally scheduled for 25 April, but postponed due to concerns over the coronavirus pandemic, and rescheduled to 24 July.

=== Coupe de la Ligue ===
18 December 2019 Round of 16	Le Mans	1–4	Paris Saint-Germain	Le Mans
21:05 CET (UTC+1)	Boé-Kane (yellow card) 16'; Manzala 53'	Report	Verratti (yellow card) 10'; Sarabia 21'; Choupo-Moting 40'; Mbappé 41'; Di María 47'; Kouassi (yellow card) 70'	Stadium: MMArena; Attendance: 24,425; Referee: Hakim Ben El Hadj

8 January 2020 Quarter-finals	Paris Saint-Germain	6–1	Saint-Étienne	Paris
21:05 CET (UTC+1)	Icardi 2', 49', 57'; Neymar 39'; Moulin 44' (o.g.); Mbappé 67'	Report	Camara (yellow card) 11'; Fofana (yellow card) 13' (yellow-red card) 31'; Debuchy (yellow card) 25'; Cabaye 71'	Stadium: Parc des Princes; Attendance: 47,677; Referee: Clément Turpin

22 January 2020 Semi-finals	Reims	0–3	Paris Saint-Germain	Reims
21:00 CET (UTC+1)	Munetsi (red card) 74'; Rajković (yellow card) 85'	Report	Marquinhos 9'; Konan 31' (o.g.); Draxler (yellow card) 38'; Kouassi 77'; Verratti (yellow card) 82'; Mbappé (yellow card) 90'	Stadium: Stade Auguste-Delaune; Attendance: 20,437; Referee: Mikael Lesage

31 July 2020 Final	Paris Saint-Germain	0–0 (a.e.t.) (6–5 p)	Lyon	Saint-Denis
21:10 CEST (UTC+2)	Thiago Silva (yellow card) 55'; Herrera (yellow card) 79'; Marquinhos (yellow card) 94'; Paredes (yellow card) 100'; Di María (yellow card) 115'	Report	Caqueret (yellow card) 19'; Bruno Guimarães (yellow card) 61'; Marçal (yellow card) 94'; Rafael (red card) 119'	Stadium: Stade de France; Attendance: 5,000; Referee: Jérôme Brisard
	Penalties
	Di María (penalty scored); Verratti (penalty scored); Paredes (penalty scored); Herrera (penalty scored); Neymar (penalty scored); Sarabia (penalty scored)		(penalty scored) Andersen; (penalty scored) Toko Ekambi; (penalty scored) Caqueret; (penalty scored) Mendes; (penalty scored) Aouar; (penalty missed) Traoré
Note: Match originally scheduled for 4 April, but postponed due to concerns over the coronavirus pandemic. It was rescheduled to 31 July.

=== UEFA Champions League ===
==== Group stage ====
Pos	Team	Pld	W	D	L	GF	GA	GD	Pts	Qualification	PAR	RMA	BRU	GAL
1	(France) Paris Saint-Germain	6	5	1	0	17	2	+15	16	Advance to knockout phase	—	3–0	1–0	5–0
2	(Spain) Real Madrid	6	3	2	1	14	8	+6	11	Advance to knockout phase	2–2	—	2–2	6–0
3	(Belgium) Club Brugge	6	0	3	3	4	12	−8	3	Transfer to Europa League	0–5	1–3	—	0–0
4	(Turkey) Galatasaray	6	0	2	4	1	14	−13	2		0–1	0–1	1–1	—

Source: UEFA
Rules for classification: Group stage tiebreakers

18 September 2019 1	Paris Saint-Germain (France)	3–0	(Spain) Real Madrid	Paris
21:00 CEST (UTC+2)	Di María 14', 33', (yellow card) 82'; Meunier 90+1'; Bernat (yellow card) 90+3'	Report	Carvajal (yellow card) 32'; Vinícius (yellow card) 82'; Varane (yellow card) 89'	Stadium: Parc des Princes; Attendance: 46,361; Referee: Anthony Taylor (England)

1 October 2019 2	Galatasaray (Turkey)	0–1	(France) Paris Saint-Germain	Istanbul
21:00 CEST (UTC+2)	Marcão (yellow card) 86'	Report	Icardi (yellow card) 7', (goal) 52'; Di María (yellow card) 80'; Herrera (yellow card) 90+3'	Stadium: Türk Telekom Stadium; Attendance: 46,532; Referee: Szymon Marciniak (Poland)

22 October 2019 3	Club Brugge (Belgium)	0–5	(France) Paris Saint-Germain	Bruges
21:00 CEST (UTC+2)	De Katelaere (yellow card) 33'; Rits (yellow card) 77'	Report	Icardi 7', 63'; Choupo-Moting (yellow card) 15'; Mbappé 61', 79', 83'; Verratti (yellow card) 73'; Meunier (yellow card) 85'	Stadium: Jan Breydel Stadium; Attendance: 26,946; Referee: Daniel Siebert (Germany)

6 November 2019 4	Paris Saint-Germain (France)	1–0	(Belgium) Club Brugge	Paris
21:00 CET (UTC+1)	Icardi 22'; Verratti (yellow card) 54'; Thiago Silva (yellow card) 74'	Report	Álvarez (yellow card) 26'	Stadium: Parc des Princes; Attendance: 47,418; Referee: Bobby Madden (Scotland)

26 November 2019 5	Real Madrid (Spain)	2–2	(France) Paris Saint-Germain	Madrid
21:00 CET (UTC+1)	Benzema 17', 79'; Marcelo (yellow card) 68'	Report	Mbappé 81'; Sarabia 83'; Meunier (yellow card) 89'	Stadium: Santiago Bernabéu; Attendance: 75,534; Referee: Artur Soares Dias (Portugal)

11 December 2019 6	Paris Saint-Germain (France)	5–0	(Turkey) Galatasaray	Paris
21:00 CET (UTC+1)	Icardi 32'; Sarabia 35'; Kurzawa (yellow card) 45'; Neymar 47'; Mbappé 63'; Cavani 84' (pen.)	Report	Belhanda (yellow card) 50'; Nzonzi (yellow card) 57'; Muslera (yellow card) 82'; Falcao (yellow card) 82'; İnan (yellow card) 85'; Lemina (yellow card) 85'	Stadium: Parc des Princes; Attendance: 46,509; Referee: István Kovács (Romania)

==== Round of 16 ====
18 February 2020 Round of 16; First leg	Borussia Dortmund (Germany)	2–1	(France) Paris Saint-Germain	Dortmund
21:00 CET (UTC+1)	Witsel (yellow card) 44'; Haaland 69', 77'	Report	Gueye (yellow card) 54'; Neymar (yellow card) 60', (goal) 75'; Meunier (yellow card) 87'; Verratti (yellow card) 89'	Stadium: Westfalenstadion; Attendance: 66,099; Referee: Antonio Mateu Lahoz (Spain)

11 March 2020 Round of 16; Second leg	Paris Saint-Germain (France)	2–0 (3–2 agg.)	(Germany) Borussia Dortmund	Paris
21:00 CET (UTC+1)	Neymar 28', (yellow card) 90'; Bernat 45+1', (yellow card) 68'; Marquinhos (yellow card) 90'; Di María (yellow card) 90'; Mbappé (yellow card) 90+3'	Report	Haaland (yellow card) 16'; Hummels (yellow card) 61'; Can (red card) 89'	Stadium: Parc des Princes; Attendance: 0 Referee: Anthony Taylor (England)

==== Quarter-finals ====
12 August 2020 Quarter-finals	Atalanta (Italy)	1–2	(France) Paris Saint-Germain	Lisbon
21:00 CEST (UTC+2)	Pašalić 27'; Djimsiti (yellow card) 37'; Freuler (yellow card) 45+1'; De Roon (yellow card) 50'; Zapata (yellow card) 53'; Toloi (yellow card) 67'; Palomino (yellow card) 85'	Report	Bernat (yellow card) 55'; Herrera (yellow card) 57'; Paredes (yellow card) 75'; Marquinhos 90'; Choupo-Moting 90+3'	Stadium: Estádio da Luz; Attendance: 0 Referee: Anthony Taylor (England)

==== Semi-finals ====
18 August 2020 Semi-finals	RB Leipzig (Germany)	0–3	(France) Paris Saint-Germain	Lisbon
21:00 CEST (UTC+2)	Laimer (yellow card) 61'; Halstenberg (yellow card) 79'; Poulsen (yellow card) 79'	Report	Marquinhos 13'; Di María 42'; Kimpembe (yellow card) 45+2'; Bernat 56'	Stadium: Estádio da Luz; Attendance: 0 Referee: Björn Kuipers (Netherlands)

==== Final ====
23 August 2020 Final	Paris Saint-Germain (France)	0–1	(Germany) Bayern Munich	Lisbon
21:00 CEST (UTC+2)	Paredes (yellow card) 52'; Neymar (yellow card) 81'; Thiago Silva (yellow card) 84'; Kurzawa (yellow card) 86'	Report	Davies (yellow card) 28'; Gnabry (yellow card) 52'; Süle (yellow card) 56'; Coman 59'; Müller (yellow card) 90+4'	Stadium: Estádio da Luz; Attendance: 0 Referee: Daniele Orsato (Italy)

== Statistics ==
=== Appearances and goals ===
No.	Pos	Nat	Player	Total		Ligue 1		Coupe de France		Coupe de la Ligue		Trophée des Champions		UEFA Champions League	
No.	Pos	Nat	Player	Apps	Goals	Apps	Goals	Apps	Goals	Apps	Goals	Apps	Goals	Apps	Goals
Goalkeepers
1	GK	(Costa Rica) CRC	Keylor Navas	35	0	21	0	3	0	2	0	0	0	9	0
16	GK	(Spain) ESP	Sergio Rico	10	0	2	0	3	0	2	0	0	0	2+1	0
30	GK	(Poland) POL	Marcin Bułka	1	0	1	0	0	0	0	0	0	0	0	0
40	GK	(France) FRA	Garissone Innocent	0	0	0	0	0	0	0	0	0	0	0	0
Defenders
2	DF	(Brazil) BRA	Thiago Silva	35	1	20+1	0	3	1	1	0	0+1	0	9	0
3	DF	(France) FRA	Presnel Kimpembe	28	0	14+2	0	0	0	2	0	0	0	10	0
4	DF	(Germany) GER	Thilo Kehrer	21	1	5+2	1	5	0	2+1	0	1	0	4+1	0
5	DF	(Brazil) BRA	Marquinhos	37	6	15+4	3	2	0	4	1	1	0	11	2
12	DF	(Belgium) BEL	Thomas Meunier	27	1	14+2	0	2+1	0	2	0	1	0	5	1
14	DF	(Spain) ESP	Juan Bernat	32	2	16+2	0	0+2	0	1	0	1	0	10	2
20	DF	(France) FRA	Layvin Kurzawa	25	1	9+5	1	4+1	0	2	0	0	0	2+2	0
22	DF	(France) FRA	Abdou Diallo	23	0	14+2	0	1	0	1+1	0	1	0	1+2	0
25	DF	(Netherlands) NED	Mitchel Bakker	5	0	1	0	2+1	0	1	0	0	0	0	0
31	DF	(France) FRA	Colin Dagba	16	0	7+3	0	3+1	0	1	0	0	0	1	0
35	DF	(France) FRA	Tanguy Kouassi	13	3	4+2	2	3	0	1+1	1	0	0	1+1	0
36	DF	(France) FRA	Loïc Mbe Soh	1	0	1	0	0	0	0	0	0	0	0	0
Midfielders
6	MF	(Italy) ITA	Marco Verratti	37	0	15+5	0	0+3	0	4	0	1	0	6+3	0
8	MF	(Argentina) ARG	Leandro Paredes	33	1	8+9	0	5	1	1+3	0	0+1	0	4+2	0
11	MF	(Argentina) ARG	Ángel Di María	41	13	23+3	8	2	0	3	1	0+1	1	9	3
19	MF	(Spain) ESP	Pablo Sarabia	40	14	13+8	4	5+1	7	2+1	1	1	0	5+4	2
21	MF	(Spain) ESP	Ander Herrera	22	1	6+2	1	3+1	0	0+3	0	1	0	4+2	0
23	MF	(Germany) GER	Julian Draxler	22	0	7+4	0	4	0	1+1	0	0	0	0+5	0
27	MF	(Senegal) SEN	Idrissa Gueye	34	1	19+1	1	3+2	0	2	0	0	0	7	0
38	MF	(France) FRA	Adil Aouchiche	3	1	1	0	1+1	1	0	0	0	0	0	0
Forwards
7	FW	(France) FRA	Kylian Mbappé	37	30	17+3	18	3	4	3	2	1	1	6+4	5
9	FW	(Uruguay) URU	Edinson Cavani	22	7	7+7	4	3	2	0+1	0	1	0	1+2	1
10	FW	(Brazil) BRA	Neymar	27	19	15	13	2	2	3	1	0	0	6+1	3
17	FW	(Cameroon) CMR	Eric Maxim Choupo-Moting	20	6	5+4	3	1+2	1	1+1	1	0	0	1+5	1
18	FW	(Argentina) ARG	Mauro Icardi	34	20	14+6	12	3+1	0	2+1	3	0	0	7	5
Players transferred out during the season
16	GK	(France) FRA	Alphonse Areola	4	0	3	0	0	0	0	0	1	0	0	0
29	FW	(Spain) ESP	Jesé	1	0	0+1	0	0	0	0	0	0	0	0	0
37	DF	(France) FRA	Arthur Zagre	1	0	0+1	0	0	0	0	0	0	0	0	0

Source: Competitions
