= 2020 Coupe de la Ligue final =

French League Cup Final
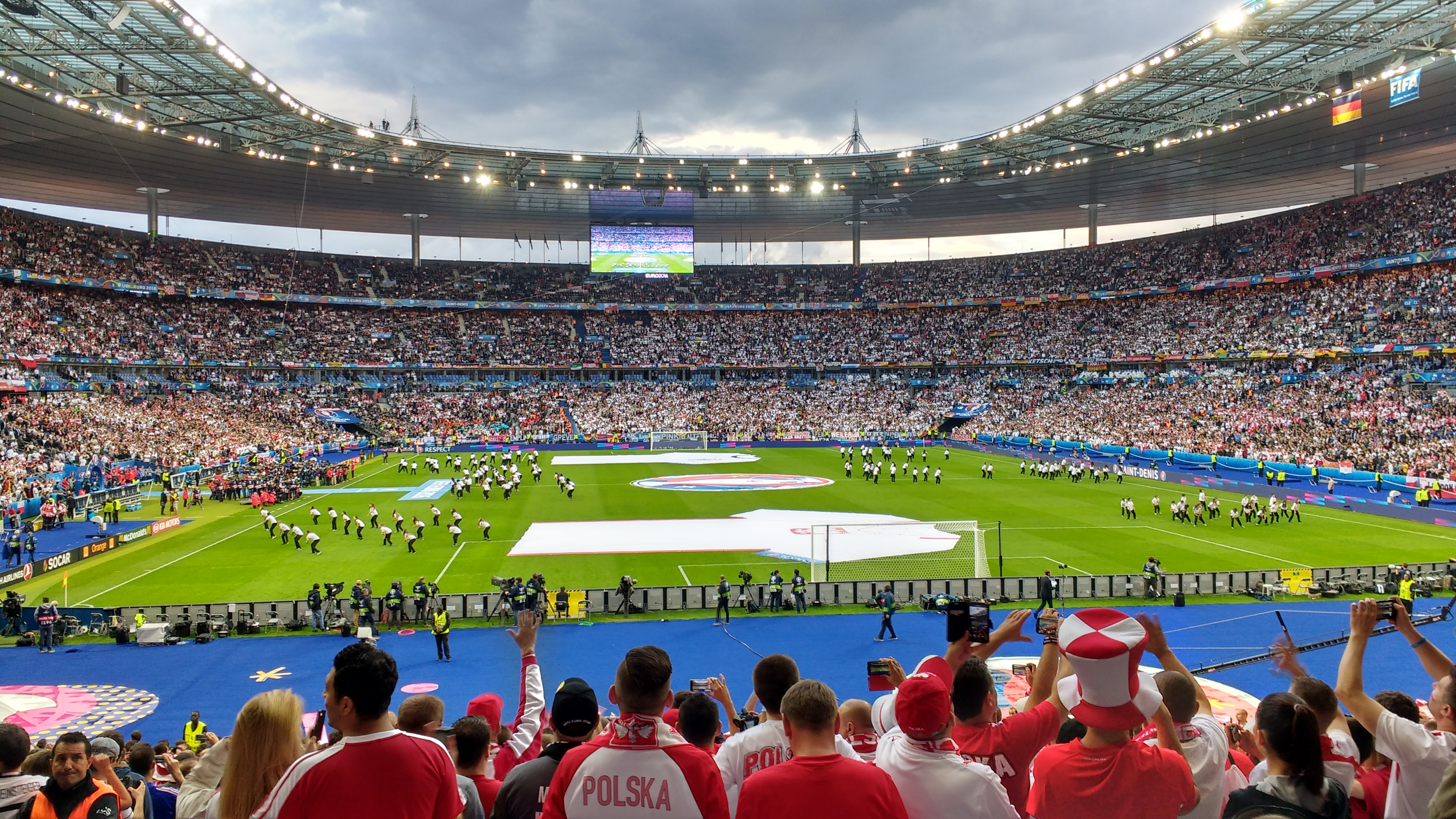
- The Stade de France in Saint-Denis hosted the final
- Event: 2019–20 Coupe de la Ligue
| Paris Saint-Germain | Lyon |
| 0 | 0 |
- After extra time Paris Saint-Germain won 6–5 on penalties
- Date: 31 July 2020
- Venue: Stade de France, Saint-Denis
- Man of the Match: Marco Verratti (Paris Saint-Germain)
- Referee: Jérôme Brisard
- Attendance: 3,500 (Note: The final was played in front of 3,500 spectators due to the COVID-19 pandemic in France.)

The 2020 Coupe de la Ligue final decided the winner of the 2019–20 Coupe de la Ligue, the 26th and last edition of France's football league cup competition, the Coupe de la Ligue, contested by the 44 teams that the Ligue de Football Professionnel (LFP) manages. The final was originally scheduled for 4 April 2020 but was postponed due to the COVID-19 pandemic in France. The final took place at the Stade de France in Saint-Denis, and was contested by Paris Saint-Germain and Lyon.

As the LFP voted in September 2019 to abolish the Coupe de la Ligue for the following season, the match was the last in the competition's history.

On 28 April 2020, Prime Minister Édouard Philippe announced all sporting events in France would be cancelled until September. On 26 June, the LFP announced that the final was rescheduled to 31 July.

Paris Saint-Germain won the final 6–5 on penalties over Lyon, following a 0–0 draw after extra time, for their record-extending ninth Coupe de la Ligue title.

== Route to the final ==
Note: In all results below, the score of the finalist is given first (H: home; A: away).

| Paris Saint-Germain | | Round | Lyon | |
|---|---|---|---|---|
| Opponent | Result | 2019–20 Coupe de la Ligue | Opponent | Result |
| Le Mans (A) | 4–1 | Round of 16 | Toulouse (H) | 4–1 |
| Saint-Étienne (H) | 6–1 | Quarter-finals | Brest (H) | 3–1 |
| Reims (A) | 3–0 | Semi-finals | Lille (H) | 2–2 (4–3 p) |

== Match ==
=== Details ===
31 July 2020
21:10 CEST

| Paris Saint-Germain | 0–0 (a.e.t.) | Lyon |
|---|---|---|
| | Report |
Penalties
| Di María (penalty scored); Verratti (penalty scored); Paredes (penalty scored); Herrera (penalty scored); Neymar (penalty scored); Sarabia (penalty scored) | 6–5 | (penalty scored) Andersen; (penalty scored) Toko Ekambi; (penalty scored) Caqueret; (penalty scored) Mendes; (penalty scored) Aouar; (penalty missed) Traoré |

Stade de France, Saint-Denis
Attendance: 3,500
Referee: Jérôme Brisard

| Paris Saint-Germain | Lyon |

| GK | 1 | (Costa Rica) Keylor Navas |
| RB | 20 | (France) Layvin Kurzawa | | (substituted off) 70' |
| CB | 2 | (Brazil) Thiago Silva (c) | (yellow card) 55' | (substituted off) 90' |
| CB | 3 | (France) Presnel Kimpembe |
| LB | 25 | (Netherlands) Mitchel Bakker |
| CM | 6 | (Italy) Marco Verratti |
| CM | 5 | (Brazil) Marquinhos | (yellow card) 95' | (substituted off) 114' |
| CM | 27 | (Senegal) Idrissa Gueye | | (substituted off) 58' |
| RW | 11 | (Argentina) Ángel Di María | (yellow card) 115' |
| CF | 18 | (Argentina) Mauro Icardi | | (substituted off) 58' |
| LW | 10 | (Brazil) Neymar |
Substitutes:
| GK | 16 | (Spain) Sergio Rico |
| DF | 4 | (Germany) Thilo Kehrer | | (substituted on) 70' |
| DF | 22 | (France) Abdou Diallo | | (substituted on) 114' |
| MF | 8 | (Argentina) Leandro Paredes | (yellow card) 100' | (substituted on) 90' |
| MF | 19 | (Spain) Pablo Sarabia | | (substituted on) 58' |
| MF | 21 | (Spain) Ander Herrera | (yellow card) 79' | (substituted on) 58' |
| MF | 23 | (Germany) Julian Draxler |
| FW | 17 | (Cameroon) Eric Maxim Choupo-Moting |
| FW | 29 | (France) Arnaud Kalimuendo |
Manager:
(Germany) Thomas Tuchel

| GK | 1 | (Portugal) Anthony Lopes |
| CB | 5 | (Belgium) Jason Denayer |
| CB | 6 | (Brazil) Marcelo | | (substituted off) 81' |
| CB | 20 | (Brazil) Marçal | (yellow card) 94' |
| RWB | 14 | (France) Léo Dubois | | (substituted off) 86' |
| LWB | 27 | (Ivory Coast) Maxwel Cornet |
| DM | 39 | (Brazil) Bruno Guimarães | (yellow card) 61' | (substituted off) 65' |
| CM | 25 | (France) Maxence Caqueret | (yellow card) 19' |
| CM | 8 | (France) Houssem Aouar |
| CF | 9 | (France) Moussa Dembélé | | (substituted off) 80' |
| CF | 11 | (Netherlands) Memphis Depay (c) | | (substituted off) 80' |
Substitutes:
| GK | 16 | (Switzerland) Anthony Racioppi |
| DF | 3 | (Denmark) Joachim Andersen | | (substituted on) 81' |
| DF | 4 | (Brazil) Rafael | (red card) 119' | (substituted on) 86' |
| MF | 12 | (Brazil) Thiago Mendes | | (substituted on) 65' |
| MF | 17 | (France) Jeff Reine-Adélaïde |
| MF | 22 | (Brazil) Jean Lucas |
| FW | 7 | (Cameroon) Karl Toko Ekambi | | (substituted on) 80' |
| FW | 10 | (Burkina Faso) Bertrand Traoré | | (substituted on) 80' |
| FW | 18 | (France) Rayan Cherki |
Manager:
(France) Rudi Garcia

Man of the Match:
Marco Verratti (Paris Saint-Germain)

Assistant referees:
Aurélien Berthomieu
Gilles Lang
Fourth official:
Thomas Léonard
Video assistant referee:
Mikael Lesage
Assistant video assistant referee:
Johan Hamel

Match rules

- 90 minutes
- 30 minutes of extra time if necessary
- Penalty shoot-out if scores still level
- Nine named substitutes
- Maximum of five substitutions, with a sixth allowed in extra time (Note: Each team was given only three opportunities to make substitutions, with a fourth opportunity in extra time, excluding substitutions made at half-time, before the start of extra time and at half-time in extra time.)

== See also ==
- 2020 Coupe de France final
- 2019–20 Olympique Lyonnais season
- 2019–20 Paris Saint-Germain FC season
