= Keylor Navas =

Costa Rican footballer (born 1986)

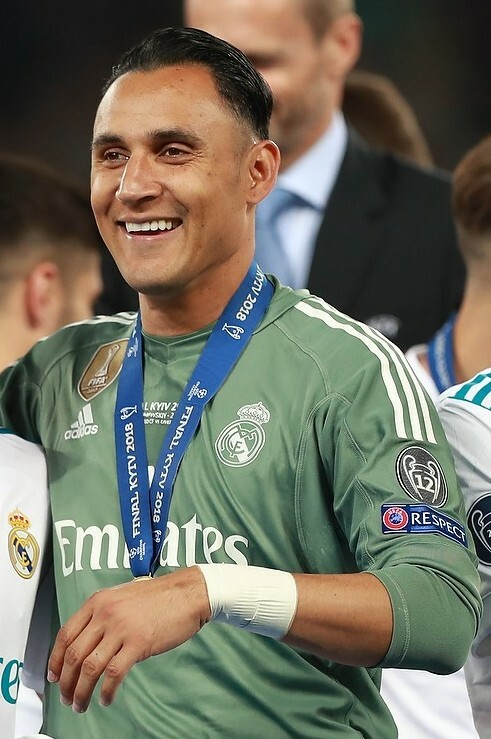
- Navas celebrating after winning the 2018 UEFA Champions League final with Real Madrid

Personal information
- Full name: Keilor Antonio Navas Gamboa
- Date of birth: 15 December 1986 (age 39)
- Place of birth: San Isidro de El General, Costa Rica
- Height: 1.85 m (6 ft 1 in)
- Position: Goalkeeper

Team information
- Current team: Pumas UNAM
- Number: 1

Youth career
- 1999–2005: Saprissa

Senior career*
| Years | Team | Apps | (Gls) |
| 2005–2010 | Saprissa | 73 | (0) |
| 2010–2012 | Albacete | 36 | (0) |
| 2011–2012 | → Levante (loan) | 1 | (0) |
| 2012–2014 | Levante | 46 | (0) |
| 2014–2019 | Real Madrid | 104 | (0) |
| 2019–2024 | Paris Saint-Germain | 75 | (0) |
| 2023 | → Nottingham Forest (loan) | 17 | (0) |
| 2025 | Newell's Old Boys | 14 | (0) |
| 2025– | Pumas UNAM | 54 | (0) |

International career^{‡}
| 2003 | Costa Rica U17 | 3 | (0) |
| 2006 | Costa Rica U21 | 6 | (0) |
| 2008– | Costa Rica | 129 | (0) |
- * Club domestic league appearances and goals as of 23:39, 7 November 2026 (UTC) ‡ National team caps and goals as of 4 October 2026

Keilor Antonio Navas Gamboa (Spanish: [ˈkej.lor anˈto.njo ˈna.βas ɣamˈbo.a]; born 15 December 1986), known as Keylor Navas, is a Costa Rican professional footballer who plays as a goalkeeper for and captains Liga MX club Pumas UNAM and the Costa Rica national team. He is regarded as one of the best goalkeepers of his generation, and one of the greatest ever CONCACAF goalkeepers.

Navas started his youth career at Saprissa in his home country, where he won six Liga FPD titles. He subsequently moved to Spanish club Albacete in 2010, and then to Levante in La Liga the following year, where he won the LFP Award for Best Goalkeeper in his final season with the latter club. Navas later joined Real Madrid in 2014 for €10 million, where he won a total of twelve titles, including one La Liga and three consecutive UEFA Champions League titles as the first choice goalkeeper. In 2019, he was signed by French club Paris Saint-Germain, and would play in his fourth Champions League final in his first season with the side.

Navas has made over 120 appearances for Costa Rica since debuting in 2008. He has represented the country at three CONCACAF Gold Cups and the 2014, 2018, and 2022 editions of the FIFA World Cup. He was a Costa Rica national team member who reached the semi-finals of the 2009 Gold Cup, in which he was named best goalkeeper. His impressive performances also helped the team reach the quarter-finals of the World Cup for the first time in 2014.

Navas was awarded CONCACAF Men's Goalkeeper of the Year for three consecutive years between 2016 and 2018. He was also named the best male CONCACAF Player of the Decade by the IFFHS. His performances in the 2017–18 season earned him the 2017–18 UEFA Club Football Award for best UEFA goalkeeper, and also saw him named in the UEFA Champions League Squad of the Season of 2018.

== Club career ==
=== Saprissa ===
Born in San Isidro de El General, Pérez Zeledón, Navas made his professional debut with Deportivo Saprissa on 6 November 2005, in a Primera league match against Asociación Deportiva Carmelita. He was the first-choice keeper in his two final seasons with the club, winning six national championships and the 2005 CONCACAF Champions' Cup. Navas was also part of the Saprissa team that finished in 3rd place at the 2005 FIFA Club World Championship.

=== Albacete ===
In July 2010, Navas signed with Albacete Balompié of the Segunda División in Spain precisely 20 years after countryman Luis Conejo, who occupied the same position. He played in 36 games out of 42 during his first season, but his team suffered relegation after finishing in last position.

=== Levante ===
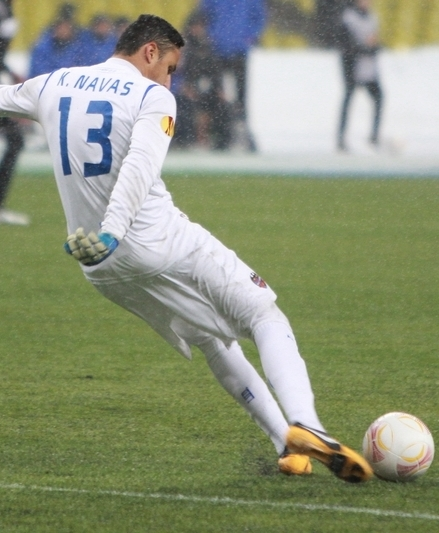
Navas playing for Levante in 2013

In the 2011–12 campaign, Navas reached La Liga, being loaned to Levante UD for a year. He made his debut in the competition on 13 May 2012 in the last round, playing in a 3–0 home win against Athletic Bilbao that confirmed the club's first ever qualification for the UEFA Europa League, and joined the Valencian club on a three-year contract in July of that year. Despite initially being back-up to Gustavo Munúa, Navas was the first-choice goalkeeper for Levante in the 2013–14 season, and was nominated as the league's best goalkeeper alongside Thibaut Courtois of Atlético Madrid and Willy Caballero of Málaga CF, going on to win the prize. In March 2014, he was La Liga Player of the Month, the first goalkeeper to win the accolade. He finished the season as the goalkeeper with the most saves (267) in La Liga, finishing fourth in the Zamora Trophy conceding 39 goals in 36 games despite playing for a 'lower ranked' team.

=== Real Madrid ===
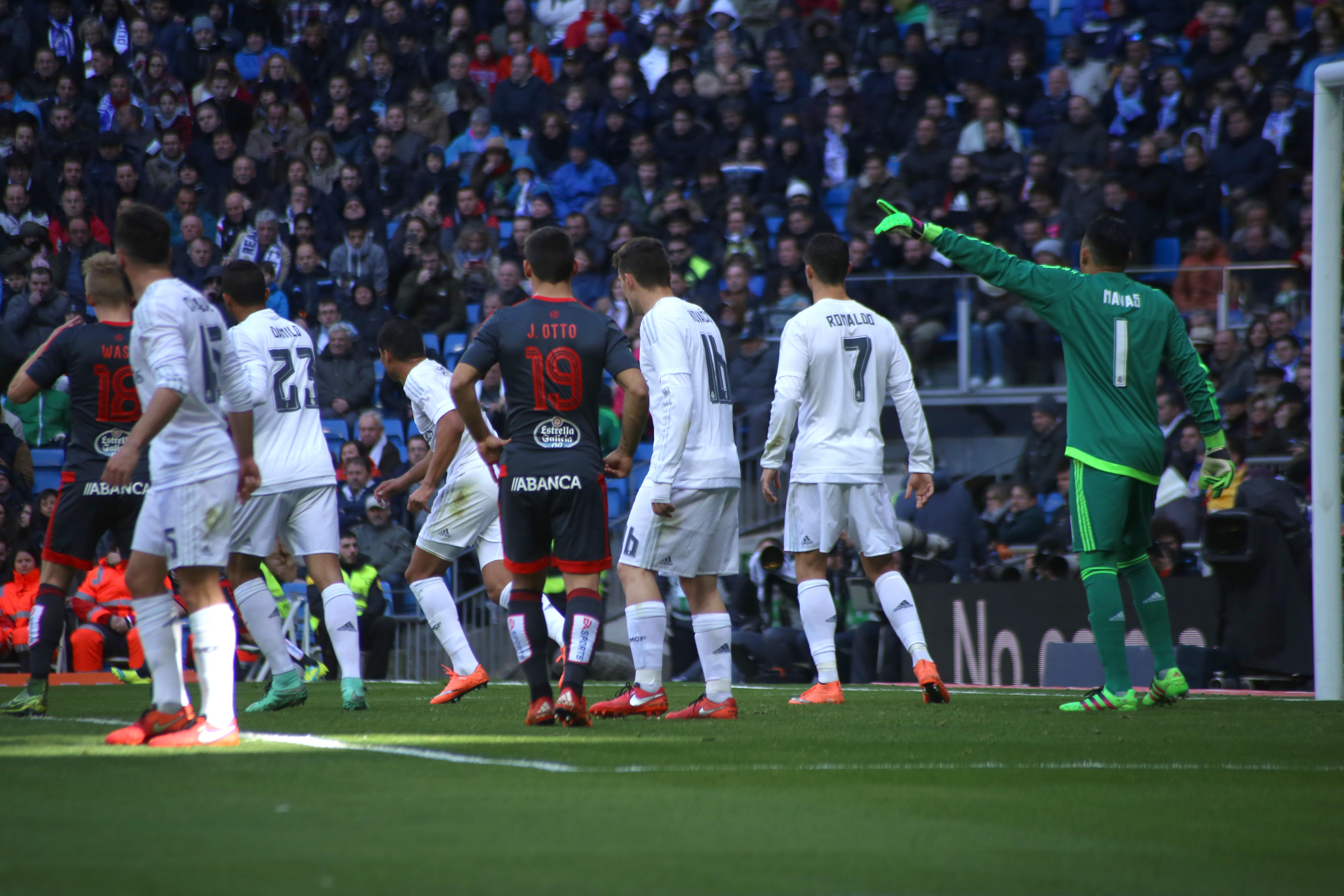
Navas giving directions to Real Madrid's defence.

==== 2014–15 ====
On 3 August 2014, Real Madrid triggered Navas' €10 million buyout clause, and he signed a six-year contract with the club. His first competitive call-up was on 12 August, sitting on the bench as Iker Casillas played in the 2014 UEFA Super Cup, which Real Madrid won 2–0 against Sevilla at the Cardiff City Stadium. Navas was given his debut for the club on 23 September, in a 5–1 victory over Elche at the Santiago Bernabéu. He was given his Champions League debut on 26 November, keeping a clean sheet in a 0–1 away win against Swiss side FC Basel. On 20 December, he was on the bench as his team won the Club World Cup, defeating Club Atlético San Lorenzo in the final in Morocco. His performances for Levante in the previous La Liga season and Costa Rica in the 2014 World Cup led him win Player of the Year at the 2014 CONCACAF Awards, earning the dual distinction of the first Costa Rican and goalkeeper to do so.

==== 2015–16 ====
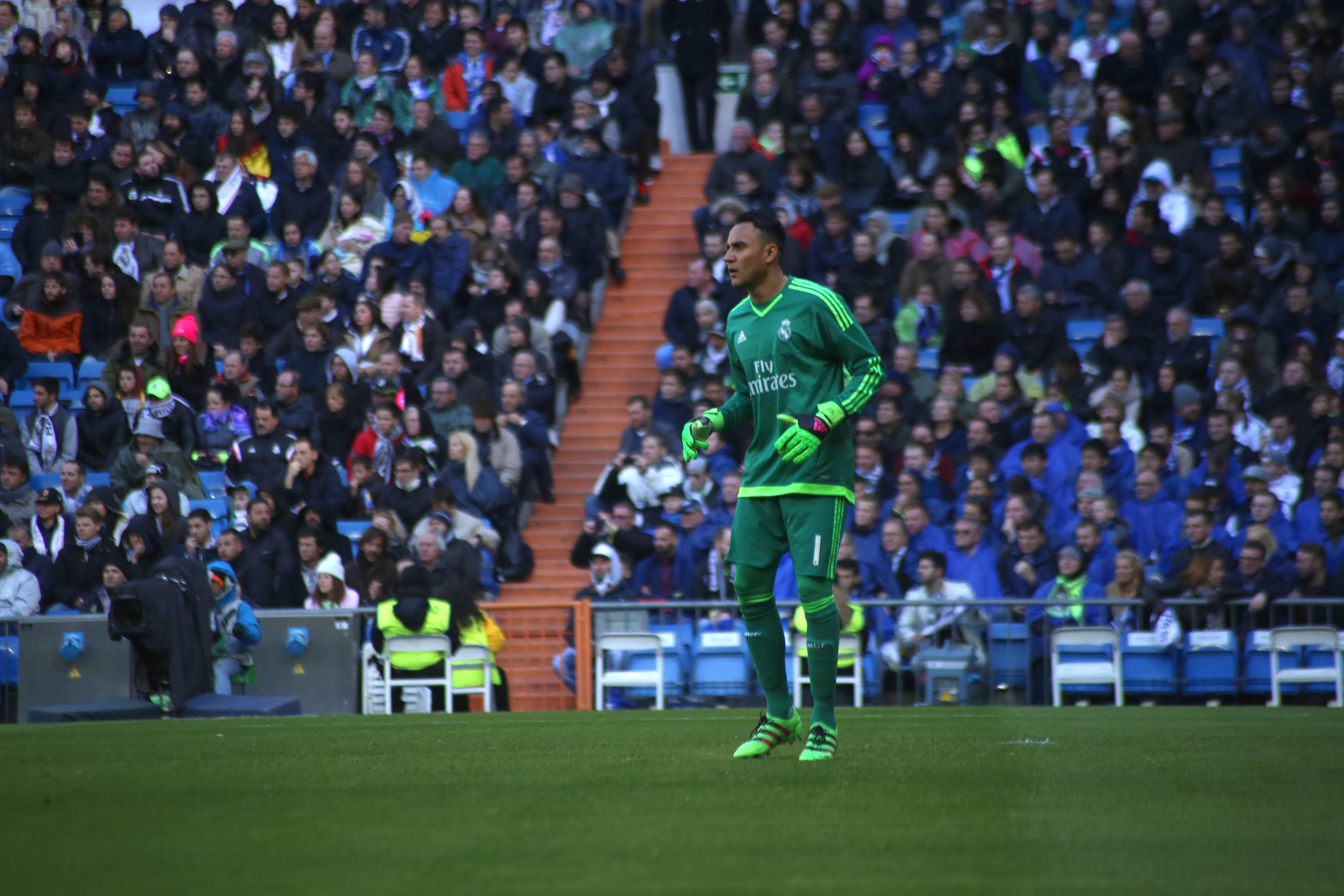
Navas with Real Madrid in 2016

With the departure of Casillas from Real Madrid, Navas inherited his number 1 shirt for the 2015–16 La Liga season. Madrid agreed to transfer Navas to Manchester United in part-exchange for David de Gea on 31 August 2015. Still, the deal collapsed because the documents were not submitted to FIFA before the Spanish transfer deadline.

Madrid thrashed Real Betis in their home opener by a score of 5–0 with a fine performance from Navas, making several saves and stopping a penalty. He was a regular starter when the team won the 2015–16 UEFA Champions League. Navas earned the dual distinction of becoming the first Costa Rican and Central American ever to play in and win the men's Champions League final. He set a new record for Real Madrid in the UEFA Champions League by not conceding a single goal in his first eight appearances; 6 of these were in the 2015–16 season. He also usurped Edwin van der Sar to reach the second spot in clean sheets behind Jens Lehmann in the all-time list. He was the best goalkeeper in the 2015–16 UEFA Champions League season, conceding only three goals in 12 appearances, keeping nine clean sheets.

==== 2016–17 ====
He was the starting goalkeeper when Madrid won the 2016–17 La Liga and the 2016–17 UEFA Champions League. On 29 January 2017 after the 3–0 win at home to Real Sociedad in La Liga, Navas became the first player from Costa Rica to reach 100 La Liga appearances. His performances during the double trophy-winning season led him to win the Player of the Year for the second time at the 2017 CONCACAF Awards.

==== 2017–18 ====
Navas made his 100th appearance for Madrid during the 2–0 second-leg home win over Barcelona. During the 2017–18 UEFA Champions League, he started eleven games, as Madrid won their third consecutive and 13th overall Champions League title beating Liverpool 3–1 in the final. The win against Liverpool saw Navas claim his 100th victory for Madrid in only 141 appearances. Navas produced some fine performances in the Champions League including a superb display against Bayern Munich in their semi-final second leg clash which helped Real Madrid qualify to the final. He made eight saves during the game, his highest tally in a Champions League knock-out game. Bayern Munich manager Jupp Heynckes praised Navas after the game as the reason for Real Madrid's qualification.

==== 2018–19 ====
Navas’ fifth season at Real Madrid began with the much-anticipated arrival of Thibaut Courtois to compete for the number 1 goalkeeping spot. Despite Courtois’ arrival, Navas was selected to play in the 2018 UEFA Super Cup which resulted in a 2–4 loss to city rivals Atlético Madrid. Navas then went on to start the opening game of La Liga, comfortably keeping his first clean sheet of the season with a 2–0 win over Getafe CF. His performances in the last Champions League campaign led him to be voted as the 2017–18 UEFA Champions League Goalkeeper of the Season beating off competition from then Roma goalkeeper Alisson Becker and Juventus goalkeeper Gianluigi Buffon. On 9 January 2019, Navas made his 150th appearance in all competitions for Madrid in their 3–0 home win against Leganés in the Copa del Rey. On 6 April 2019 Navas became the first ever non-Spanish goalkeeper to reach 100 La Liga appearances for Real Madrid.

=== Paris Saint-Germain ===
Navas joined Paris Saint-Germain (PSG) on a four-year contract on 2 September 2019, becoming the first Costa Rican to play for the men's team. He made his Ligue 1 debut 12 days later, keeping a clean sheet in a 1–0 home win against Strasbourg. On 24 July 2020, Navas won his 20th career club trophy after beating Saint-Étienne in the Coupe de France final. On 31 July, he kept a clean sheet and saved a spot kick in the resulting shoot-out as PSG defeated Lyon 6–5 on penalties in the 2020 Coupe de la Ligue Final. That win marked Navas' 15th trophy in Europe, matching Rafael Márquez's record for a CONCACAF player. On 23 August 2020, Navas started his 4th Champions League final, losing to Bayern Munich 1–0. He finished the European campaign with 5 clean sheets, the second most after Manuel Neuer despite having played 191 minutes less.

Navas started his second season with PSG as one of the seven club players to test positive for COVID-19. He missed the clubs first two games due to the quarantine requirement. On 16 September 2020, Navas played his first game of the season winning and keeping a clean sheet against Metz. On 17 September, UEFA announced Navas, for the second time, as a nominee for the 2019–20 Champions League Goalkeeper of the Season award. On 20 September, Navas starred in PSG's 3–0 away win to Nice with a second consecutive clean sheet as well as several excellent saves. On 13 January 2021, Navas won the 2020 Trophée des Champions. With that win, he became the CONCACAF player with the most European trophies, 16, surpassing former Rafael Márquez. On 20 April 2021, Navas was voted Ligue 1 Player of the Month for March, making him the first CONCACAF player to win the award. Navas signed a contract with PSG until 2024 on 26 April 2021.

Ahead of the 2021–22 season, PSG signed Italian goalkeeper Gianluigi Donnarumma. This raised eyebrows over potential competition between Navas and his Italian counterpart. In the 2022–23 season, new coach Christophe Galtier confirmed that Navas would occupy the position of number two goalkeeper.

==== Loan to Nottingham Forest and return to PSG ====
Following the long-term injury to Dean Henderson, on 31 January 2023, Navas signed for Premier League club Nottingham Forest on loan until the end of the season. He made his debut for Forest on 5 February, keeping a clean sheet in a 1–0 win over Leeds United, and was named player of the match.

Following his return to PSG, Navas was included in the Champions League squad for the 2023–24 season, having rejected a transfer to Saudi club Al Hilal. On 11 May 2024, he announced his departure from PSG at the end of the season.

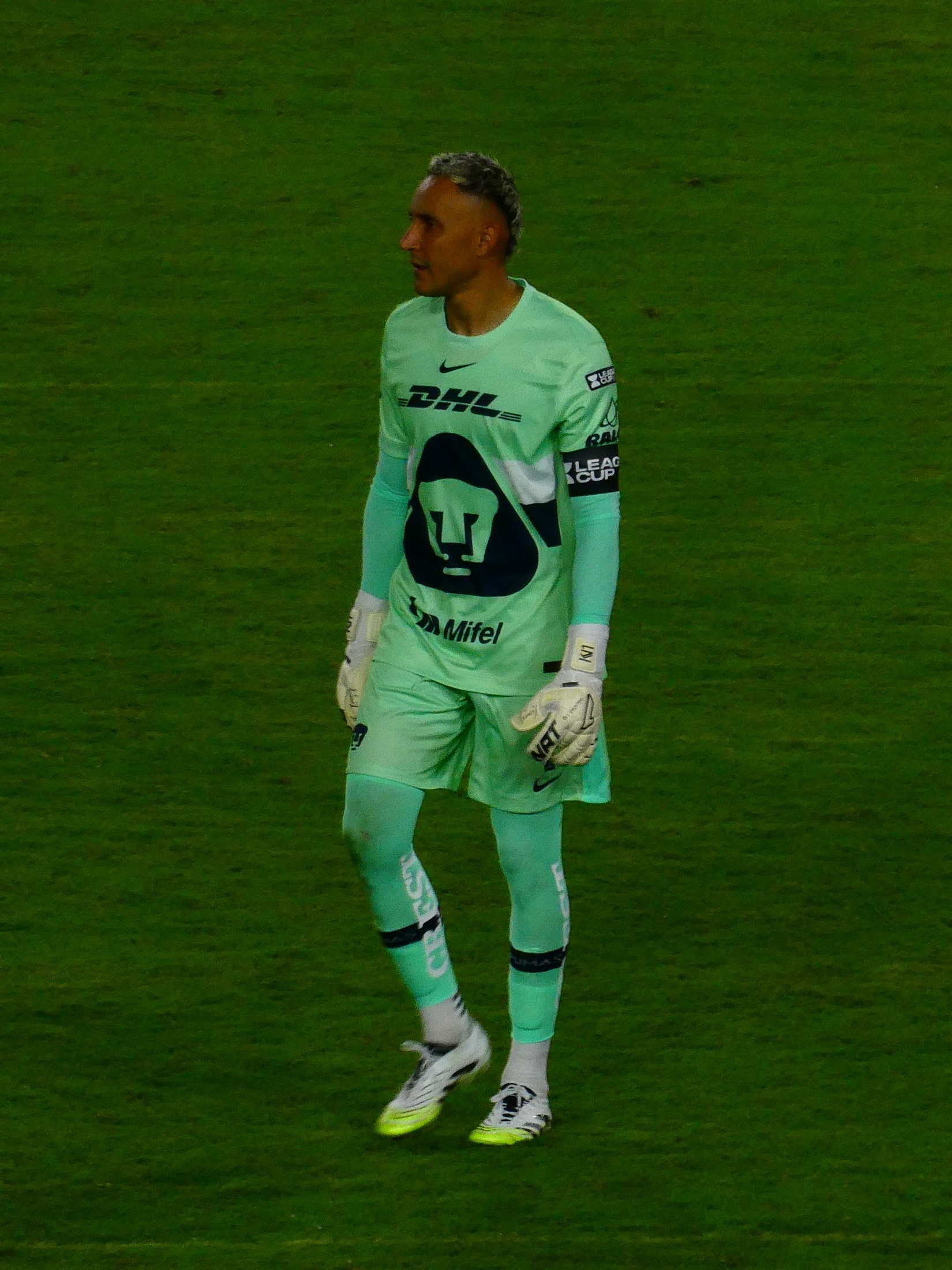
Navas playing for Pumas UNAM in 2025

=== Newell's Old Boys ===
On January 21, 2025, Navas joined Newell's Old Boys on a free transfer. A month later, on 2 February, he made his debut in a 1–0 win against Aldosivi.

In June 2025 Navas began to seek his departure from the team due to relationship problems with the coaching staff and fans of Newell's, which made him request not to play in the first matches of the 2025 Clausura Tournament, while asking the club to allow him to be transferred to another team.

After several weeks of failed sale negotiations, Newell's announced Navas's departure from the club on July 21, 2025, six months after joining the team.

=== Pumas ===
On 24 July 2025, Liga MX club Pumas UNAM officially announced the signing of Navas.

== International career ==
=== Youth career and early senior career ===
Navas was part of the Costa Rica national team that played in the 2003 FIFA U-17 World Championship held in Finland. He was called up for the senior national team for the first time in August 2006 to play a friendly tournament in Europe against Austria and Switzerland. He was a team member who won a bronze medal at the 2006 Central American and Caribbean Games. Navas gained his debut senior cap on 11 October 2008, in a 4–1 away victory over Suriname in the third round of stuff for the 2010 FIFA World Cup, which qualified the team into the next stage. Four days later at the Estadio Ricardo Saprissa, he kept his first international clean sheet in a 2–0 victory over Haiti. The team eventually reached the intercontinental play-offs for the tournament, losing narrowly to Uruguay. Navas was also a member of the Costa Rica squad that finished runners-up in the 2009 UNCAF Nations Cup.

Navas appeared with Los Ticos in two CONCACAF Gold Cup competitions, being named the best goalkeeper in the 2009 edition as he helped his country reach the semi-finals. He returned to allow them to the quarter-finals two years later, in what is to date his last appearance at a Gold Cup, as he would miss the tournament for the following ten years, a period that encompasses five editions. He also missed the Copa América Centenario similarly.

=== 2014 World Cup ===
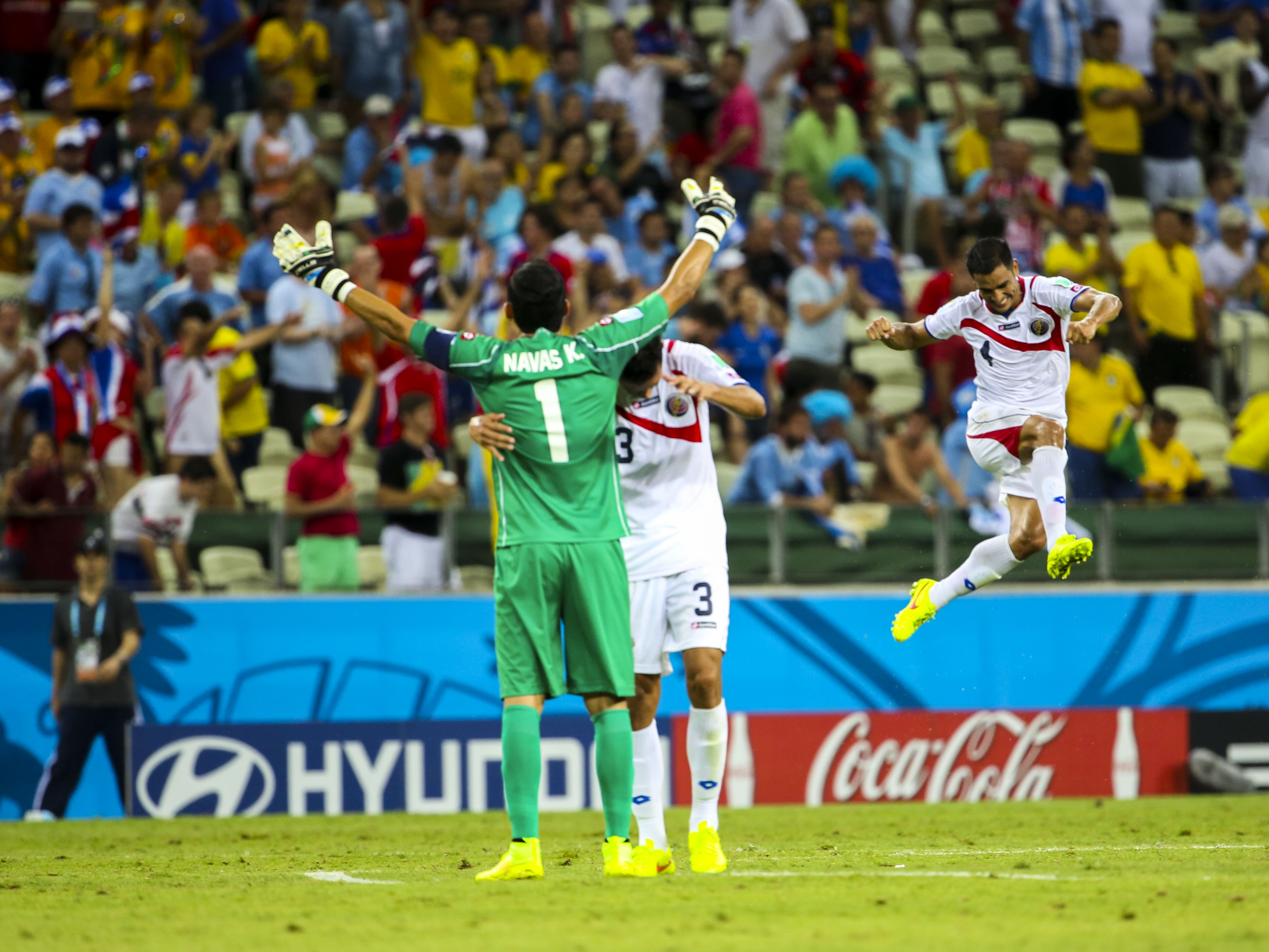
Navas and Giancarlo González celebrating Costa Rica's victory over Uruguay at the 2014 FIFA World Cup

Navas made his debut in the FIFA World Cup on 14 June 2014, appearing in a 3–1 group stage win against Uruguay in Fortaleza, and started the other two group games only conceding a single goal as Costa Rica qualified for the knockout stages as group winners for the first time.

On 29 June, in the round of 16 match against Greece, Navas was named man of the match after several saves in normal time and a save from Theofanis Gekas' kick during the penalty shootout, which led to Costa Rica reaching the quarter-finals for the first time ever. He ended the tournament with three clean sheets from five matches, as the country was knocked out by the Netherlands after a penalty shootout, where he was named man of the match for the third time, the only goalkeeper to do so. He was also one of three nominees for the Golden Glove Award, losing out to Manuel Neuer of Germany.

=== 2018 FIFA World Cup ===
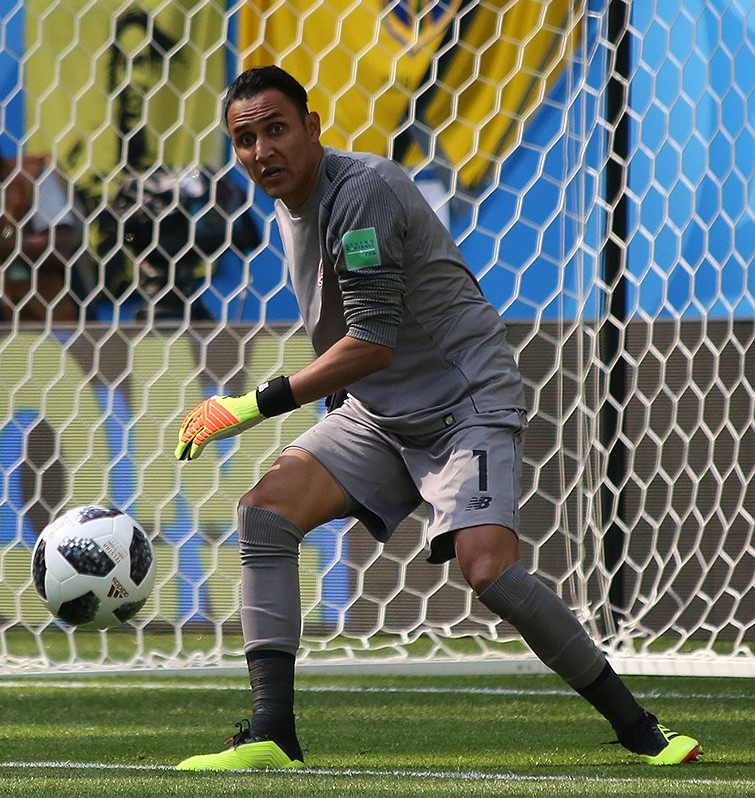
Navas during Costa Rica's World Cup match against Brazil in 2018.

In May 2018, Navas was named in the final squad for the 2018 World Cup. He started all three group games, making ten saves and conceding five goals.

=== 2022 FIFA World Cup ===
In November 2022, Navas was named in the final squad for the 2022 World Cup In Costa Rica's first game against Spain, Navas conceded seven goals. In the second game of group play against Japan, Navas kept a clean sheet giving Costa Rica a surprise 1–0 win over their opponent. Navas would lose 4–2 in Costa Rica's third group game against Germany. Los Ticos finished fourth in their group with three points and a goal difference of –8.

=== Retirement and return ===
Navas played his last international match on 26 March 2024 in a friendly against Argentina. On 23 May 2024, Navas announced his retirement from the national team.

In May 2025, he announced his return to international football and was subsequently included in Costa Rica's squad for the 2025 CONCACAF Gold Cup by head coach Miguel Herrera.

== Style of play ==
Often rated by several pundits as one of the best goalkeepers in the world, and considered by some in the sport as the best in the history of CONCACAF, Navas is an energetic keeper, who is primarily known for his agility, speed, and athleticism in goal, as well as his quick reflexes and excellent shot-stopping ability, which enables him to compensate for his relative lack of height. He has also drawn praise in the media for his decisive performances in essential matches, and his penchant for producing difficult and crucial saves for his team in critical moments. In 2017, former goalkeeper Manuel Almunia praised Navas, describing him as "the prototype model" goalkeeper, also adding: "He's spectacular between the posts, he's brave, skillful and very agile. He maintains his concentration, and he's also intelligent... For me, he deserves all the respect he gets for what he's done."

In 2020, Navas cited compatriot Léster Morgan as his goalkeeping idol.

== Personal life ==
Keylor Navas was raised in a low-income family in San Isidro de El General, a town in the southeast of San José province. He is a devout Christian. He spoke about his faith, saying, "God for me comes first. Before every game, I kneel, open my arms, and pray ... My favorite passage of the Bible is Galatians 1:10, which says: "If I were still trying to please man, I would not be a servant of Christ." On 3 December 2014, Navas announced that he had obtained Spanish citizenship.

Navas has been married to Andrea Salas since 2009, and the couple have three children together: Daniela, Mateo, and Thiago. Navas is the stepfather of Daniela, whom Andrea had in a previous relationship.

A documentary film, Hombre de Fe (Man of Faith), based on the life of Navas, was released on 28 December 2017.

His paternal half-brother, Eder Navas, is also a footballer who plays for Saprissa.

In 2022, Navas obtained his academic degree as a master in sport management from Johan Cruyff Institute.

In June 2024, a report from BFM TV detailed that a former employee filed a complaint against Navas for concealed work.

== Career statistics ==
=== Club ===
As of match played 7 November 2026

Appearances and goals by club, season and competition
| Club | Season | League | | | National cup (Note: Includes Copa del Rey, Coupe de France, Copa Argentina) | | Continental | | Other | | Total | |
| Club | Season | Division | Apps | Goals | Apps | Goals | Apps | Goals | Apps | Goals | Apps | Goals |
|---|---|---|---|---|---|---|---|---|---|---|---|---|
| Saprissa | 2005–06 | Costa Rican Primera División | 2 | 0 | — | | 0 | 0 | — | | 2 | 0 |
| Saprissa | 2006–07 | Costa Rican Primera División | 3 | 0 | — | | 0 | 0 | — | | 3 | 0 |
| Saprissa | 2007–08 | Costa Rican Primera División | 15 | 0 | — | | 0 | 0 | — | | 15 | 0 |
| Saprissa | 2008–09 | Costa Rican Primera División | 26 | 0 | — | | 5 (Note: Appearances in CONCACAF Champions Cup) | 0 | — | | 31 | 0 |
| Saprissa | 2009–10 | Costa Rican Primera División | 27 | 0 | — | | 4 | 0 | — | | 31 | 0 |
| Saprissa | Total | | 73 | 0 | — | | 9 | 0 | — | | 82 (Note: Navas's complete statistics at Saprissa, from his debut in 2005 until his departure in 2010, are unclear. Numbers may not reflect reality.) | 0 |
| Albacete | 2010–11 | Segunda División | 36 | 0 | 0 | 0 | — | | — | | 36 | 0 |
| Levante (loan) | 2011–12 | La Liga | 1 | 0 | 5 | 0 | — | | — | | 6 | 0 |
| Levante | 2012–13 | La Liga | 9 | 0 | 4 | 0 | 12 (Note: Appearances in UEFA Europa League) | 0 | — | | 25 | 0 |
| Levante | 2013–14 | La Liga | 37 | 0 | 2 | 0 | — | | — | | 39 | 0 |
| Levante | Levante total | | 47 | 0 | 11 | 0 | 12 | 0 | — | | 70 | 0 |
| Real Madrid | 2014–15 | La Liga | 6 | 0 | 3 | 0 | 2 (Note: Appearances in UEFA Champions League) | 0 | 0 | 0 | 11 | 0 |
| Real Madrid | 2015–16 | La Liga | 34 | 0 | 0 | 0 | 11 | 0 | — | | 45 | 0 |
| Real Madrid | 2016–17 | La Liga | 27 | 0 | 0 | 0 | 12 | 0 | 2 (Note: Appearances in FIFA Club World Cup) | 0 | 41 | 0 |
| Real Madrid | 2017–18 | La Liga | 27 | 0 | 1 | 0 | 11 | 0 | 5 (Note: One appearance in UEFA Super Cup, two appearances in Supercopa de España, two appearances in FIFA Club World Cup) | 0 | 44 | 0 |
| Real Madrid | 2018–19 | La Liga | 10 | 0 | 7 | 0 | 3 | 0 | 1 (Note: Appearance in UEFA Super Cup) | 0 | 21 | 0 |
| Real Madrid | Total | | 104 | 0 | 11 | 0 | 39 | 0 | 8 | 0 | 162 | 0 |
| Paris Saint-Germain | 2019–20 | Ligue 1 | 21 | 0 | 3 | 0 | 9 | 0 | 2 (Note: Appearances in Coupe de la Ligue) | 0 | 35 | 0 |
| Paris Saint-Germain | 2020–21 | Ligue 1 | 29 | 0 | 3 | 0 | 12 | 0 | 1 (Note: Appearance in Trophée des Champions) | 0 | 45 | 0 |
| Paris Saint-Germain | 2021–22 | Ligue 1 | 21 | 0 | 1 | 0 | 3 | 0 | 1 | 0 | 26 | 0 |
| Paris Saint-Germain | 2022–23 | Ligue 1 | 0 | 0 | 2 | 0 | 0 | 0 | 0 | 0 | 2 | 0 |
| Paris Saint-Germain | 2023–24 | Ligue 1 | 4 | 0 | 2 | 0 | 0 | 0 | 0 | 0 | 6 | 0 |
| Paris Saint-Germain | Total | | 75 | 0 | 11 | 0 | 24 | 0 | 4 | 0 | 114 | 0 |
| Nottingham Forest (loan) | 2022–23 | Premier League | 17 | 0 | — | | — | | — | | 17 | 0 |
| Newell's Old Boys | 2025 | Argentine Primera División | 14 | 0 | 2 | 0 | — | | — | | 16 | 0 |
| Pumas UNAM | 2025–26 | Liga MX | 38 | 0 | — | | 2 | 0 | 2 (Note: Appearances in Leagues Cup) | 0 | 42 | 0 |
| Pumas UNAM | 2026–27 | Liga MX | 16 | 0 | — | | 0 | 0 | 3 | 0 | 19 | 0 |
| Pumas UNAM | Total | | 54 | 0 | — | | 2 | 0 | 5 | 0 | 61 | 0 |
| Career total | | | 422 | 0 | 35 | 0 | 86 | 0 | 17 | 0 | 560 | 0 |

=== International ===
As of match played 4 October 2026

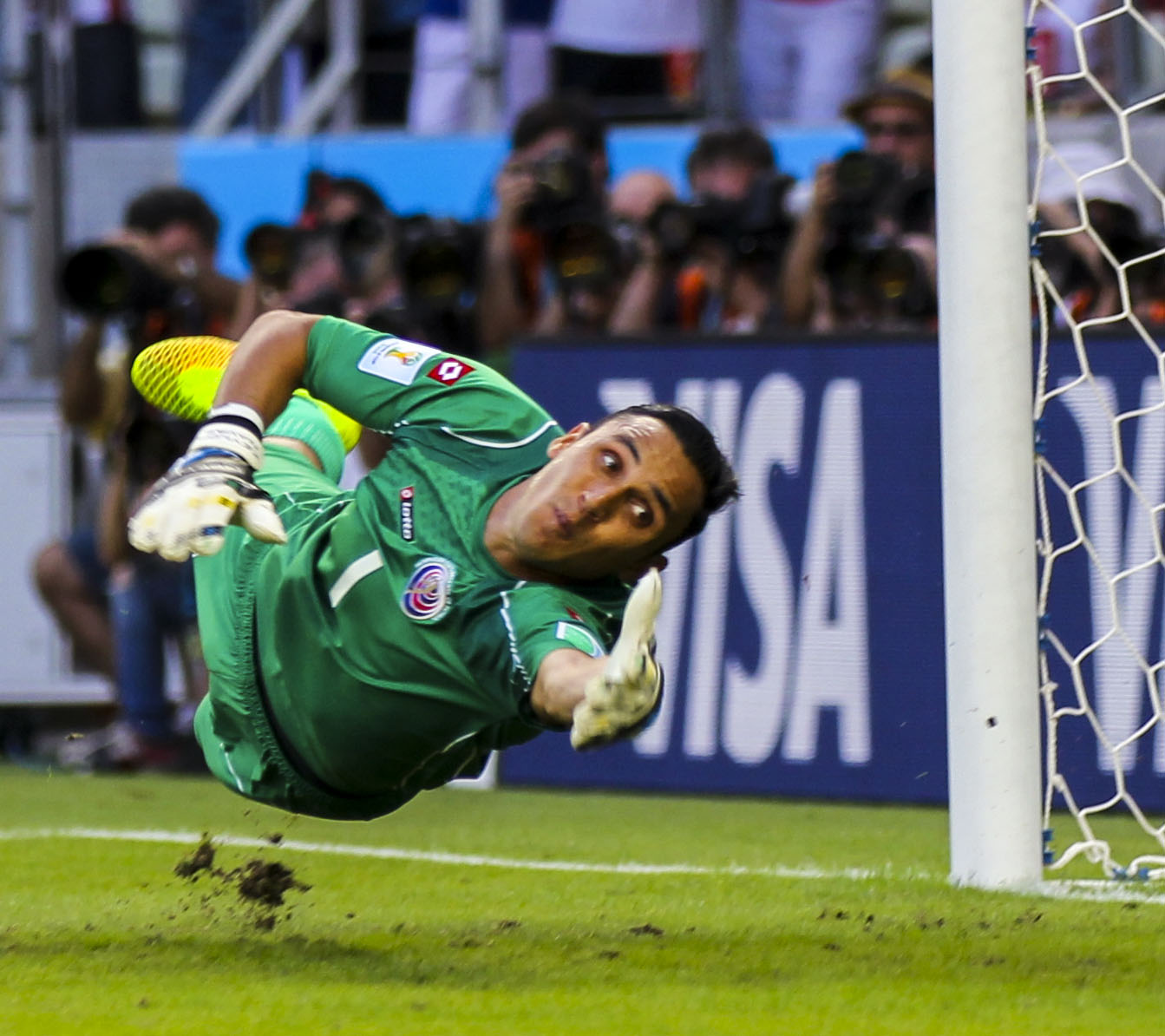
Navas playing for Costa Rica at the 2014 FIFA World Cup

Appearances and goals by national team and year
| National team | Year | Apps | Goals |
|---|---|---|---|
| Costa Rica | 2008 | 2 | 0 |
| Costa Rica | 2009 | 14 | 0 |
| Costa Rica | 2010 | 5 | 0 |
| Costa Rica | 2011 | 11 | 0 |
| Costa Rica | 2012 | 10 | 0 |
| Costa Rica | 2013 | 8 | 0 |
| Costa Rica | 2014 | 10 | 0 |
| Costa Rica | 2015 | 4 | 0 |
| Costa Rica | 2016 | 5 | 0 |
| Costa Rica | 2017 | 7 | 0 |
| Costa Rica | 2018 | 10 | 0 |
| Costa Rica | 2019 | 5 | 0 |
| Costa Rica | 2020 | 1 | 0 |
| Costa Rica | 2021 | 8 | 0 |
| Costa Rica | 2022 | 10 | 0 |
| Costa Rica | 2023 | 2 | 0 |
| Costa Rica | 2024 | 2 | 0 |
| Costa Rica | 2025 | 13 (Note: Includes a non-FIFA friendly played against Catalonia, which is counted as an official match by the Costa Rican Football Federation.) | 0 |
| Costa Rica | 2026 | 2 | 0 |
| Total | | 129 | 0 |

== Honours ==
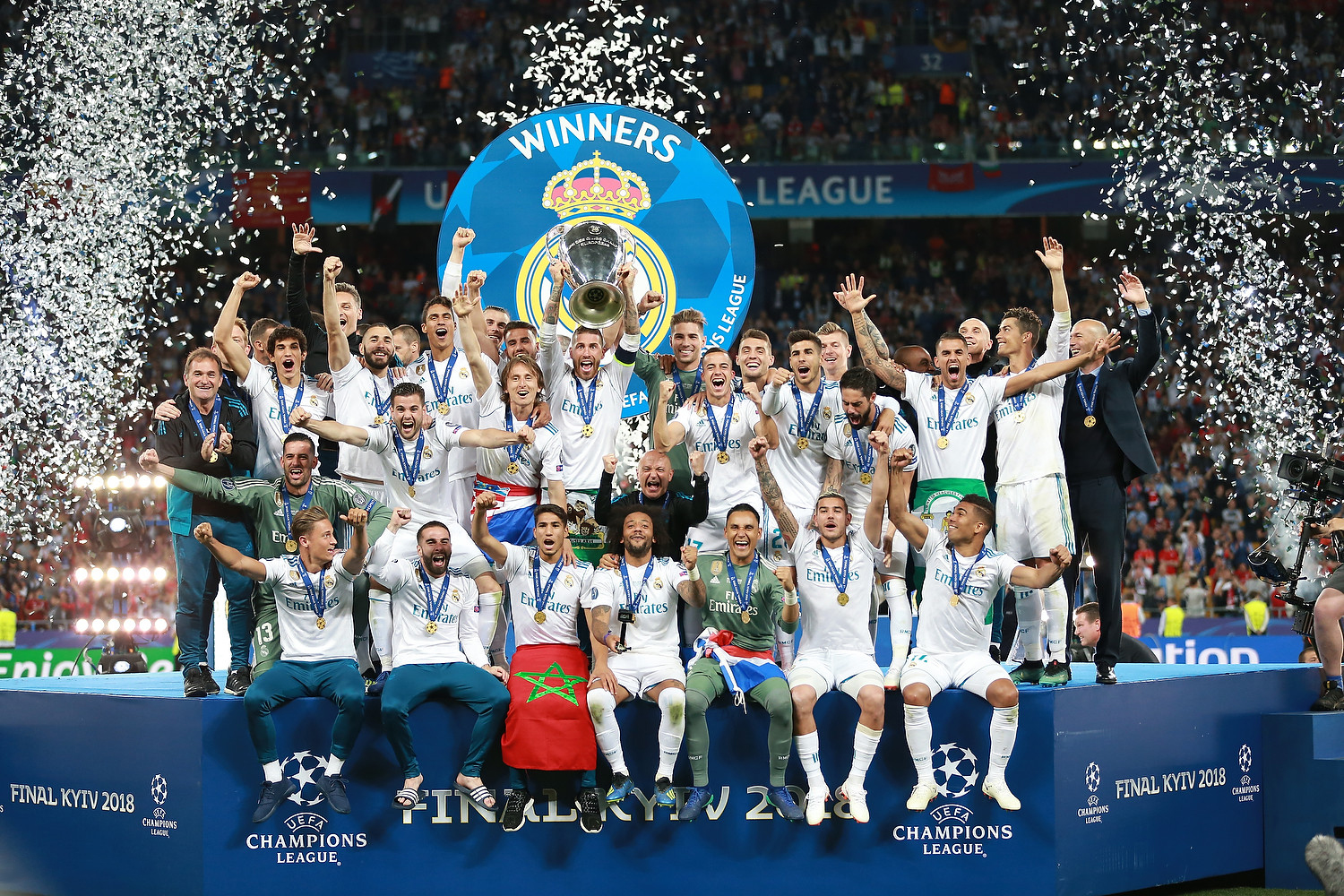
Navas (front row, with green uniform) celebrating Real Madrid's victory at the 2018 UEFA Champions League final. He is one of seven goalkeepers to win the title a record three times.

Saprissa

- Primera Division de Costa Rica: 2005–06, 2006–07, Invierno 2007, Verano 2008, Invierno 2008, Verano 2010
- CONCACAF Champions Cup: 2005

Real Madrid

- La Liga: 2016–17
- Supercopa de España: 2017
- UEFA Champions League: 2015–16, 2016–17, 2017–18
- UEFA Super Cup: 2014, 2017
- FIFA Club World Cup: 2014, 2016, 2017, 2018

Paris Saint-Germain

- Ligue 1: 2019–20, 2021–22, 2023–24
- Coupe de France: 2019–20, 2020–21, 2023–24
- Coupe de la Ligue: 2019–20
- Trophée des Champions: 2020, 2022, 2023
- UEFA Champions League runner-up: 2019–20

Costa Rica

- UNCAF Nations Cup runner-up: 2009, 2011

Individual

- UNCAF Nations Cup Best Player: 2009
- CONCACAF Gold Cup Best Goalkeeper: 2009
- CONCACAF Gold Cup All-Tournament Team: 2009
- La Liga Player of the Month: March 2014
- LFP Awards Best Goalkeeper: 2013–14
- UNFP Player of the Month: March 2021
- ESM Team of the Year: 2015–16
- CONCACAF Men's Player of the Year: 2014, 2017
- Trofeo EFE: 2016
- CONCACAF Men's Goalkeeper of the Year: 2016, 2017, 2018
- CONCACAF Best XI: 2016, 2017, 2018
- Facebook FA La Liga Best Goalkeeper: 2016
- UEFA Champions League Squad of the Season: 2017–18
- UEFA Champions League Goalkeeper of the Season: 2017–18
- Ibero-American Community Trophy: 2017
- IFFHS CONCACAF Team of the Year: 2020
- IFFHS CONCACAF Best Man Player of the Decade: 2011–2020
- IFFHS CONCACAF Team of the Decade: 2011–2020
- UNFP Ligue 1 Goalkeeper of the Year: 2020–21
- UNFP Ligue 1 Team of the Year: 2020–21
- Liga MX Best XI: Clausura 2026
- Liga MX All-Star: 2026
