= Mitchel Bakker =

Dutch footballer (born 2000)

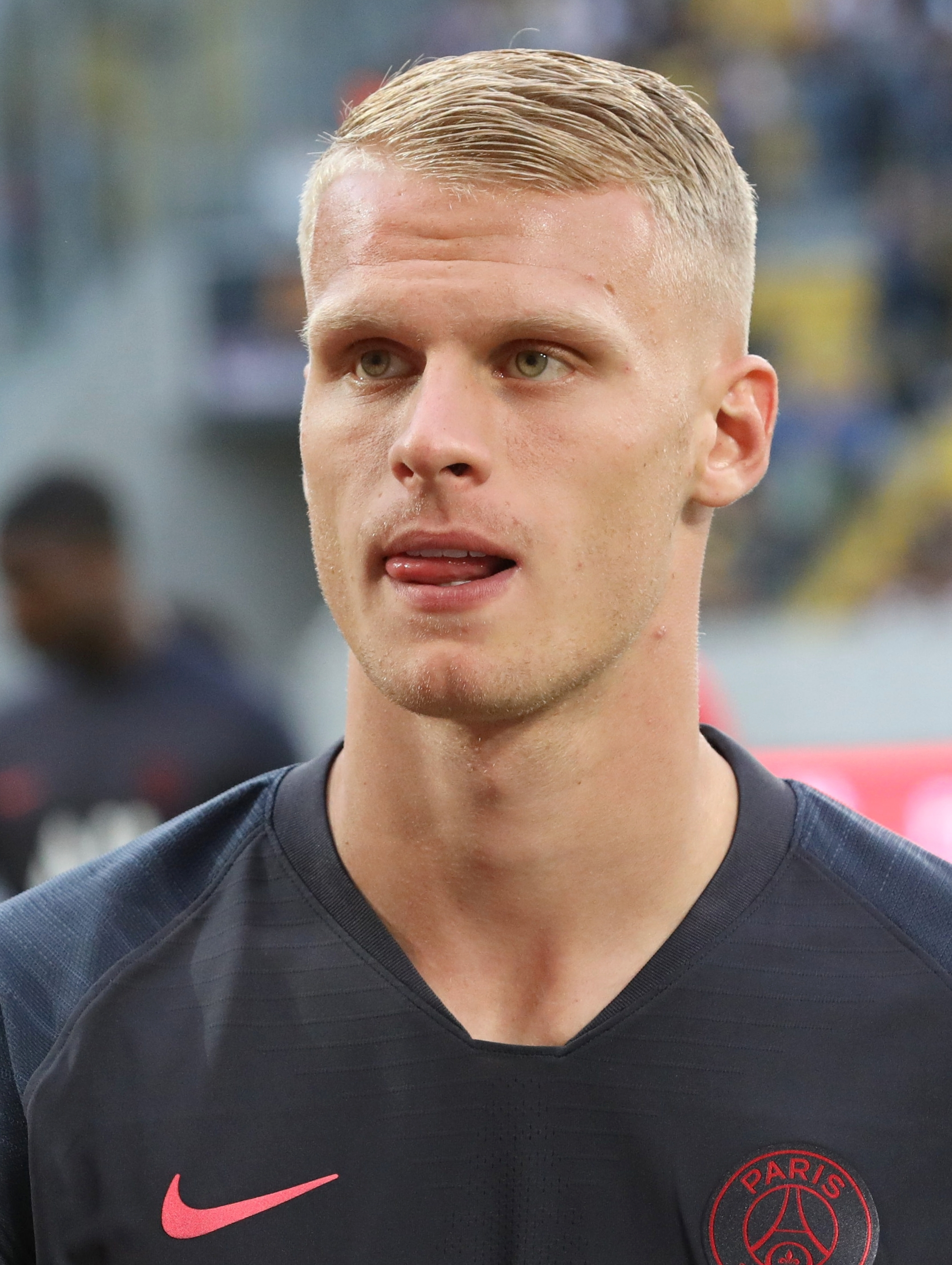
- Bakker with Paris Saint-Germain in 2019

Personal information
- Date of birth: 20 June 2000 (age 26)
- Place of birth: Purmerend, Netherlands
- Height: 1.89 m (6 ft 2 in)
- Positions: Left-back; left wing-back; left midfielder

Team information
- Current team: NEC
- Number: 5

Youth career
- 2010–2017: Ajax

Senior career*
Years	Team	Apps	(Gls)
2017–2019	Jong Ajax	37	(0)
2018–2019	Ajax	0	(0)
2019–2021	Paris Saint-Germain	27	(0)
2021–2023	Bayer Leverkusen	53	(4)
2023–2026	Atalanta	16	(1)
2024–2025	→ Lille (loan)	24	(3)
2026–	NEC	3	(0)

International career
2014–2015	Netherlands U15	7	(0)
2015–2016	Netherlands U16	6	(0)
2016–2017	Netherlands U17	14	(0)
2017–2018	Netherlands U18	7	(0)
2018–2019	Netherlands U19	7	(0)
2020–2023	Netherlands U21	21	(0)
- * Club domestic league appearances and goals as of 25 October 2026

Mitchel Bakker (born 20 June 2000) is a Dutch professional footballer who plays as a left-back, left wing-back or left midfielder for Eredivisie club NEC.

== Club career ==
=== Ajax ===
Bakker made his debut for Ajax in a 7–0 KNVB Cup win against Te Werve on 26 September 2018. He played his second and final game for the senior team in a 3–0 cup win against Go Ahead Eagles on 31 October 2018.

=== Paris Saint-Germain ===
On 7 July 2019, Bakker signed for French side Paris Saint-Germain (PSG) on a four-year-contract, signing as a free agent.

Bakker made his debut for PSG on 29 January 2020 in a 2–0 Coupe de France win against Pau, coming on as a substitute. He made his first start for the club in a 6–1 cup win against Dijon on 12 February, and made his first Ligue 1 appearance and start in a 4–4 draw against Amiens on 15 February. After the Ligue 1 season was ended early due to the COVID-19 pandemic, PSG was awarded the title. On 15 June, Bakker was nominated for the Golden Boy, being one of three PSG players in the 100-player shortlist; he was later included in the list of the top 20 candidates. On 24 July, Bakker started and played all 90 minutes in the 2020 Coupe de France Final against Saint-Étienne. The final score was 1–0 for PSG. In the 2020 Coupe de la Ligue Final on 31 July, he played the entire match as PSG won 6–5 on penalties against Lyon.

On 20 October 2020, Bakker made his UEFA Champions League debut, coming on as a substitute in a 2–1 loss against Manchester United. Due to injuries to left-backs Juan Bernat and Layvin Kurzawa, Bakker had more playing time in the 2020–21 season than he did in the previous season; by the end of the campaign, he had recorded 40 appearances. He notably started in PSG's 2–1 Champions League semi-final loss to Manchester City on 28 April 2021. Bakker won the Trophée des Champions and Coupe de France in his final season in Ligue 1.

=== Bayer Leverkusen ===
On 12 July 2021, Bakker joined Bundesliga club Bayer Leverkusen, and subsequently signed a four-year contract with the club. According to reports, the transfer fee of the deal was of €7 million, potentially rising to €10 million with contractual bonuses. A buy-back option for PSG was reportedly included in the deal. Bakker scored his first goal for Leverkusen in a 4–0 win over Borussia Mönchengladbach on 21 August.

=== Atalanta ===
On 7 July 2023, Bakker joined Serie A club Atalanta. On 1 September 2026, Atalanta announced an agreement with Bakker to terminate the player's contract.

==== Loan to Lille ====
On 30 August 2024, Bakker returned to France, having been loaned to Ligue 1 club Lille for the rest of the 2024–25 season.

=== NEC ===
On 8 October 2026, Bakker signed a one-season contract with NEC.

== International career ==
Bakker is a former youth international for the Netherlands, most notably representing the Netherlands U21 side from 2020 to 2023. He has represented his home country from under-15 level to then under-21.

In October 2022, Bakker was included in the preliminary 39-man Dutch squad for the 2022 FIFA World Cup in Qatar. However, he did not end up making the final roster for the tournament.

== Career statistics ==
As of match played 25 October 2026

Appearances and goals by club, season and competition
Club	Season	League			National cup (Note: Includes KNVB Cup, Coupe de France, DFB-Pokal, Coppa Italia)		League cup (Note: Includes Coupe de la Ligue)		Europe		Other		Total	
Club	Season	Division	Apps	Goals	Apps	Goals	Apps	Goals	Apps	Goals	Apps	Goals	Apps	Goals
Jong Ajax	2017–18	Eerste Divisie	15	0	—		—		—		—		15	0
Jong Ajax	2018–19	Eerste Divisie	22	0	—		—		—		—		22	0
Jong Ajax	Total		37	0	—		—		—		—		37	0
Ajax	2018–19	Eredivisie	0	0	2	0	—		0	0	—		2	0
Paris Saint-Germain	2019–20	Ligue 1	1	0	3	0	1	0	0	0	0	0	5	0
Paris Saint-Germain	2020–21	Ligue 1	26	0	4	0	—		10 (Note: Appearances in UEFA Champions League)	0	0	0	40	0
Paris Saint-Germain	Total		27	0	7	0	1	0	10	0	0	0	45	0
Bayer Leverkusen	2021–22	Bundesliga	25	1	1	0	—		4 (Note: Appearances in UEFA Europa League)	0	—		30	1
Bayer Leverkusen	2022–23	Bundesliga	28	3	1	0	—		11 (Note: Five appearances in UEFA Champions League, six appearances and one goal in UEFA Europa League)	1	—		40	4
Bayer Leverkusen	Total		53	4	2	0	—		15	1	—		70	5
Atalanta	2023–24	Serie A	14	1	1	0	—		5	0	—		20	1
Atalanta	2024–25	Serie A	1	0	—		—		—		1 (Note: Appearance in UEFA Super Cup)	0	2	0
Atalanta	2025–26	Serie A	1	0	0	0	—		0	0	—		1	0
Atalanta	Total		16	1	1	0	—		5	0	1	0	23	1
Lille (loan)	2024–25	Ligue 1	24	3	3	0	—		8	1	—		35	4
Atalanta U23	2025–26	Serie C	1	0	—		—		—		—		1	0
NEC	2026–27	Eredivisie	3	0	0	0	—		0	0	—		3	0
Career total			161	8	15	0	1	0	38	2	1	0	216	10

== Honours ==
Jong Ajax

- Eerste Divisie: 2017–18

Ajax

- KNVB Cup: 2018–19

Paris Saint-Germain

- Ligue 1: 2019–20
- Coupe de France: 2019–20, 2020–21
- Coupe de la Ligue: 2019–20
- Trophée des Champions: 2020
- UEFA Champions League runner-up: 2019–20

Atalanta

- UEFA Europa League: 2023–24
