= Thilo Kehrer =

German footballer (born 1996)

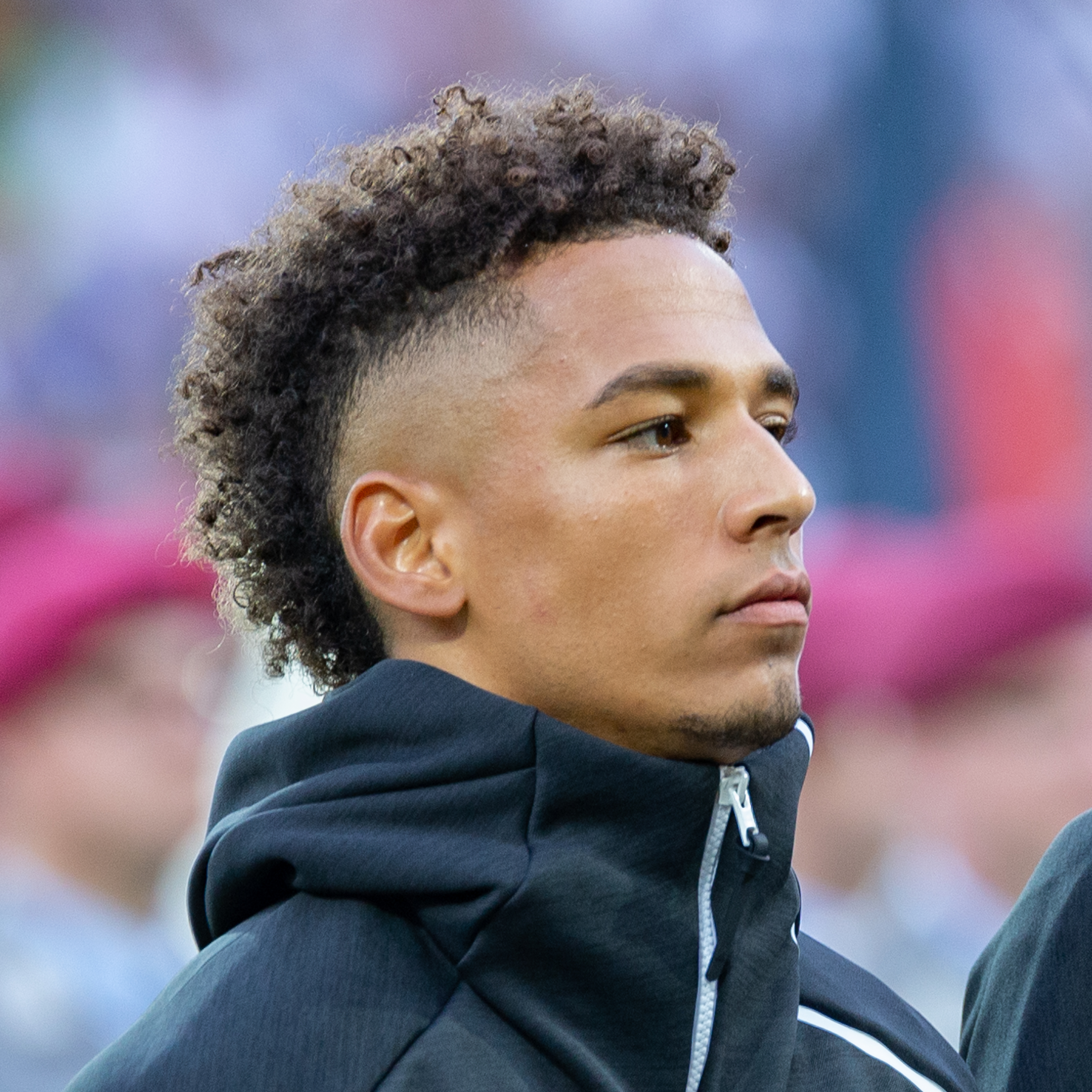
- Kehrer with Germany in 2019

Personal information
- Full name: Jan Thilo Kehrer
- Date of birth: 21 September 1996 (age 30)
- Place of birth: Tübingen, Germany
- Height: 1.86 m (6 ft 1 in)
- Position: Defender

Team information
- Current team: Ajax (on loan from Monaco)
- Number: 6

Youth career
- 2000–2006: TSG Tübingen
- 2006–2010: SSV Reutlingen
- 2010–2012: VfB Stuttgart
- 2012–2015: Schalke 04

Senior career*
Years	Team	Apps	(Gls)
2015–2016	Schalke 04 II	19	(0)
2016–2018	Schalke 04	45	(4)
2018–2022	Paris Saint-Germain	85	(4)
2022–2024	West Ham United	31	(0)
2024	→ Monaco (loan)	15	(1)
2024–	Monaco	56	(4)
2026–	→ Ajax (loan)	6	(0)

International career^{‡}
2012	Germany U16	1	(1)
2012–2013	Germany U17	12	(0)
2015	Germany U19	5	(1)
2015–2016	Germany U20	6	(1)
2017	Germany U21	9	(0)
2018–	Germany	28	(0)
Medal record
UEFA European Under-21 Championship
Winner	2017 Poland
- * Club domestic league appearances and goals as of 18:43, 25 October 2026 (UTC) ‡ National team caps and goals as of 15:38, 8 June 2025 (UTC)

Jan Thilo Kehrer (German pronunciation: [ˈtiːlo ˈkeːʁɐ]; born 21 September 1996) is a German professional footballer who plays as a defender for Eredivisie club Ajax, on loan from Ligue 1 club Monaco, and the Germany national team. Mainly a centre-back, he can also play in either full-back position.

== Club career ==
=== Schalke 04 ===
Kehrer is a graduate of Schalke 04. He made his Bundesliga debut on 6 February 2016 against VfL Wolfsburg in a 3–0 home win. He scored his first goal for the club on 1 April 2017 in the Revierderby against Borussia Dortmund at home, producing the equalizer in a 1–1 draw.

On 5 May 2018 he scored twice as Schalke secured second place in the Bundesliga for the 2017–18 season and UEFA Champions League football for the 2018–19 season.

=== Paris Saint-Germain ===
On 16 August 2018, it was announced that Kehrer had been transferred to Ligue 1 club Paris Saint-Germain for €37 million.

On 10 April 2019, Kehrer scored his first goal for Paris Saint-Germain, in a league match against Strasbourg that ended 2–2. He scored his second goal for the club in a 2–1 league win away to Nantes on 4 February 2020. On 24 July 2020, in the Coupe de France Final, Kehrer suffered an injury and was replaced by Colin Dagba. PSG went on to win the match 1–0.

On 7 November 2020, Kehrer came off injured in a match against Rennes. He was set to miss three to four months of action due to an adductor injury. His recovery proved to be faster than expected, and he made his return to play as a substitute in a 3–1 win against Manchester United in the UEFA Champions League group stage on 2 December.

=== West Ham United ===
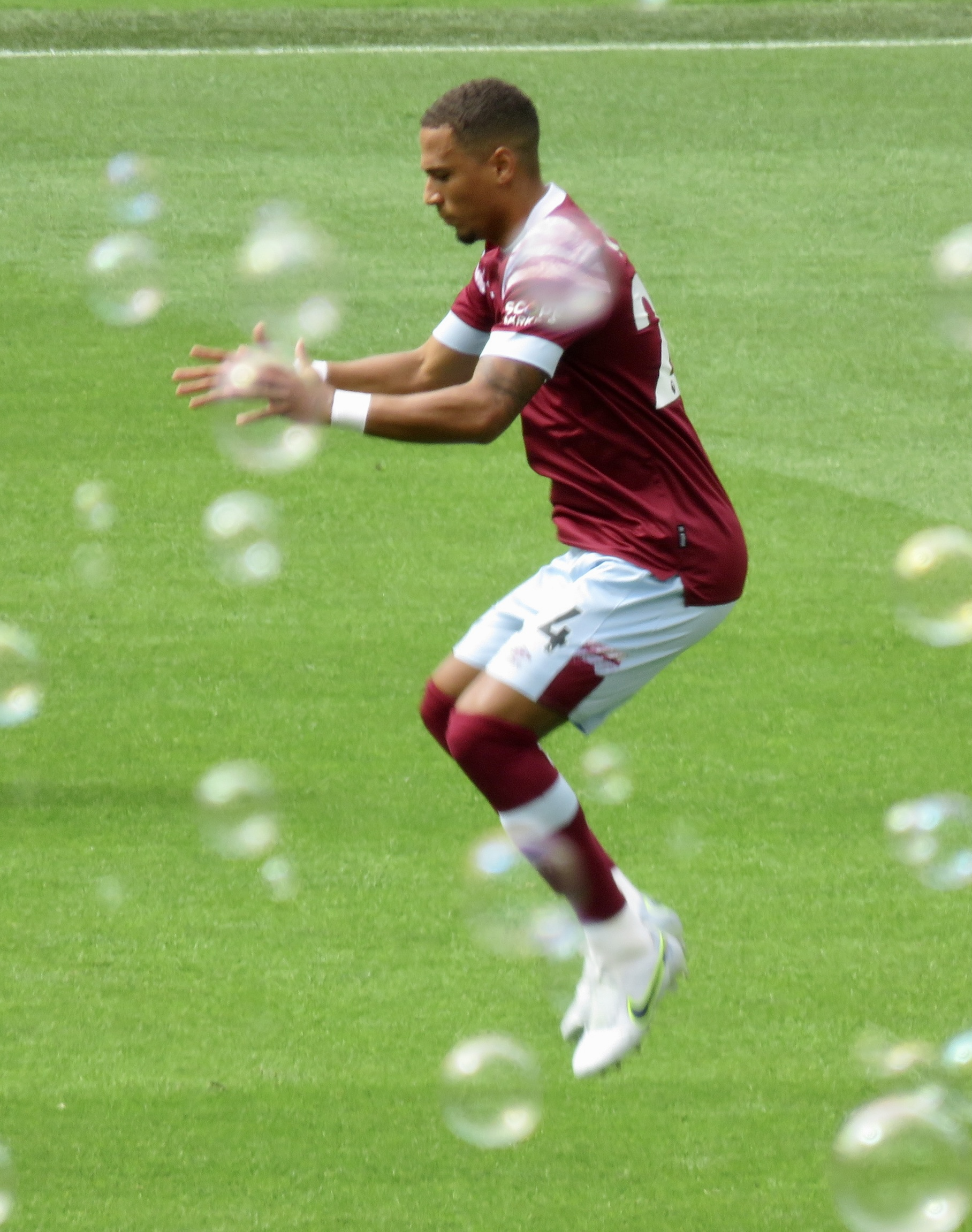
Kehrer ahead of a match with West Ham United

On 17 August 2022, Kehrer signed for West Ham United on a four-year contract with the option of an additional two years. The transfer fee was reported to be £10.1m. He made his West Ham debut on 18 August in the Europa Conference League in a 3–1 home win against Viborg coming on as a substitute for Angelo Ogbonna.

=== Monaco ===
On 5 January 2024, Kehrer joined Ligue 1 club Monaco on a loan deal until the end of the season, with an option-to-buy, reported to be around €11 million (£9.5 million).

Having helped Monaco finish second in Ligue 1 and qualify for the Champions League, in May 2024, Monaco took-up their option-to-buy and Kehrer moved to the club on a four-year contract for a fee believed to be around £9.5 million. Kehrer scored his first goal in the UEFA Champions League on 5 November 2024, scoring the winning goal in a 0-1 victory over Bologna.

==== Loan to Ajax ====
On 2 September 2026, Kehrer was loaned to Eredivisie club Ajax for the 2026–27 season.

== International career ==
Kehrer is a youth international for Germany. Kehrer won the U-21 Euros in 2017 and has captained the German U-21s against Kosovo, Azerbaijan and Israel.

Kehrer was called up to the full Germany squad for the first time on 29 August 2018, for Germany's opening 2018–19 UEFA Nations League match against France and the friendly against Peru.

He was named in Germany's squad for the 2022 FIFA World Cup and made a field appearance in one of the team´s group-stage matches.

== Personal life ==
Kehrer was born in Tübingen, Baden-Württemberg, to a German father and a Burundian mother.

He supports the peace and development organisation Anstoß zur Hoffnung e.V. (engl.: Kickoff to hope). Through his support, socially disadvantaged people in his mother’s homeland find hope and help.

He became a father of a daughter in 2020.

== Career statistics ==
=== Club ===
As of match played 25 October 2026

Appearances and goals by club, season and competition
Club	Season	League			National cup (Note: Includes DFB-Pokal, Coupe de France, FA Cup)		League cup (Note: Includes Coupe de la Ligue, EFL Cup)		Europe		Other		Total	
Club	Season	Division	Apps	Goals	Apps	Goals	Apps	Goals	Apps	Goals	Apps	Goals	Apps	Goals
Schalke 04 II	2015–16	Regionalliga West	19	0	—		—		—		—		19	0
Schalke 04	2015–16	Bundesliga	1	0	0	0	—		0	0	—		1	0
Schalke 04	2016–17	Bundesliga	16	1	1	0	—		8 (Note: Appearances in UEFA Europa League)	0	—		25	1
Schalke 04	2017–18	Bundesliga	28	3	5	0	—		—		—		33	3
Schalke 04	Total		45	4	6	0	—		8	0	—		59	4
Paris Saint-Germain	2018–19	Ligue 1	27	1	5	0	1	0	7 (Note: Appearances in UEFA Champions League)	0	0	0	40	1
Paris Saint-Germain	2019–20	Ligue 1	7	1	5	0	3	0	5	0	1 (Note: Appearance in Trophée des Champions)	0	21	1
Paris Saint-Germain	2020–21	Ligue 1	24	0	4	0	—		5	0	0	0	33	0
Paris Saint-Germain	2021–22	Ligue 1	27	2	3	0	—		3	0	1	0	34	2
Paris Saint-Germain	Total		85	4	17	0	4	0	20	0	2	0	128	4
West Ham United	2022–23	Premier League	27	0	1	0	0	0	10 (Note: Appearances in UEFA Conference League)	0	—		38	0
West Ham United	2023–24	Premier League	4	0	0	0	3	0	5	0	—		12	0
West Ham United	Total		31	0	1	0	3	0	15	0	—		50	0
Monaco (loan)	2023–24	Ligue 1	15	1	3	0	—		—		—		18	1
Monaco	2024–25	Ligue 1	27	4	2	0	—		10	1	1 (Note: Appearance in Trophée des Champions)	0	40	5
Monaco	2025–26	Ligue 1	28	0	3	0	—		9	0	—		40	0
Monaco	2026–27	Ligue 1	1	0	—		—		0	0	—		1	0
Monaco	Monaco total		71	5	8	0	—		19	1	1	0	99	6
Ajax (loan)	2026–27	Eredivisie	6	0	0	0	—		1	0	—		7	0
Career total			257	13	32	0	7	0	63	1	3	0	362	14

=== International ===
As of match played 8 June 2025

Appearances and goals by national team and year
National team	Year	Apps	Goals
Germany
Germany	2018	4	0
Germany	2019	3	0
Germany	2020	2	0
Germany	2021	8	0
Germany	2022	8	0
Germany	2023	3	0
Germany	2025	1	0
Total		28	0

== Honours ==
Paris Saint-Germain

- Ligue 1: 2018–19, 2019–20, 2021–22
- Coupe de France: 2019–20, 2020–21; runner-up: 2018–19
- Coupe de la Ligue: 2019–20
- Trophée des Champions: 2019, 2020, 2022
- UEFA Champions League runner-up: 2019–20

West Ham United

- UEFA Europa Conference League: 2022–23

Germany U21

- UEFA European Under-21 Championship: 2017
