= 2020 Coupe de France final =

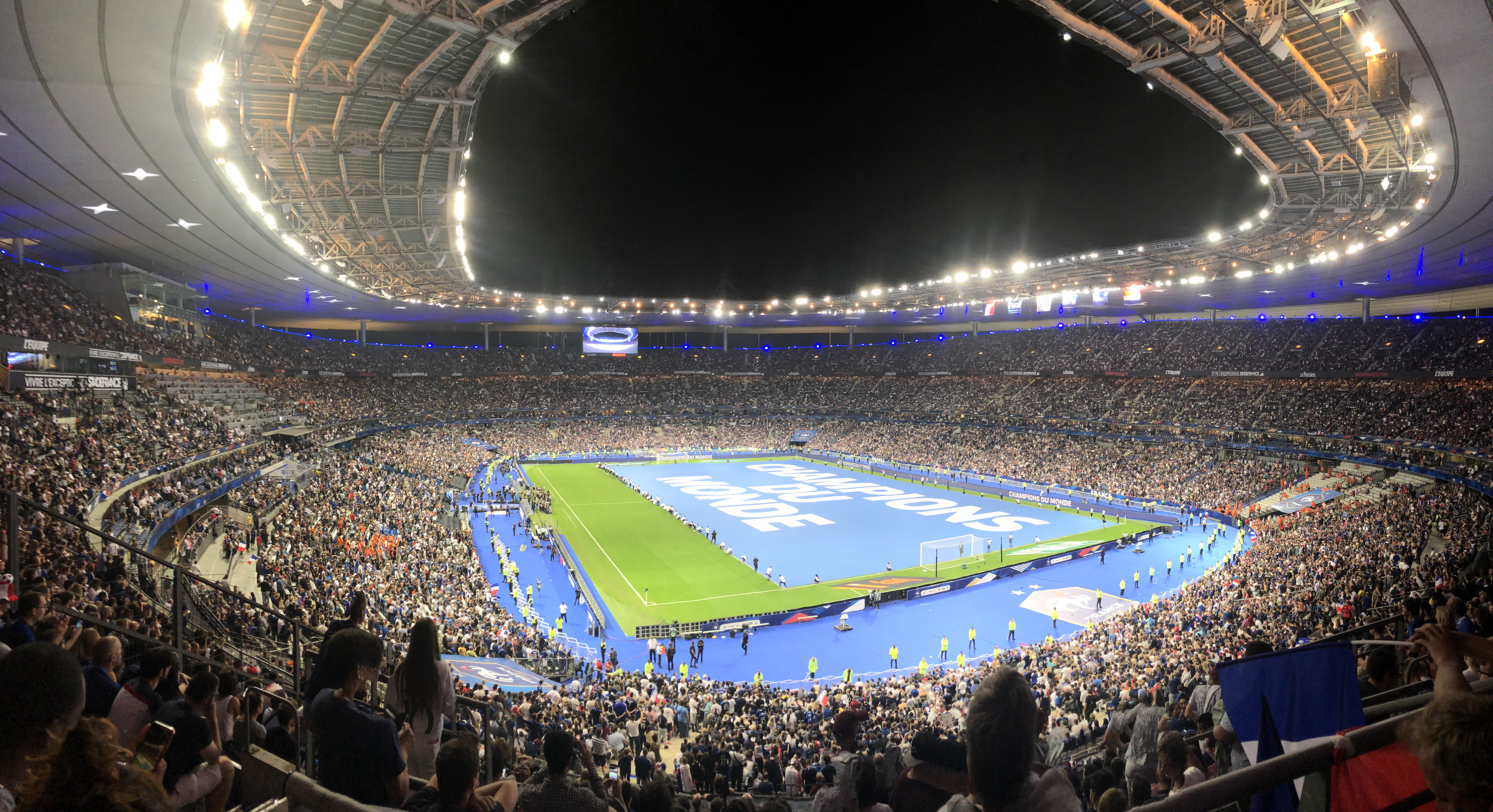
- The Stade de France hosted the final
- Event: 2019–20 Coupe de France
Paris Saint-Germain	Saint-Étienne
Ligue 1	Ligue 1
1	0
- Date: 24 July 2020
- Venue: Stade de France, Saint-Denis
- Referee: Amaury Delerue
- Attendance: 2,805 (Note: The final was played in front of 2,805 spectators due to the COVID-19 pandemic in France.)

The 2020 Coupe de France final was a football match between Paris Saint-Germain and Saint-Étienne to decide the winner of the 2019–20 Coupe de France, the 103rd season of the Coupe de France. The final was originally scheduled for 25 April, but was postponed to 24 July due to concerns over the COVID-19 pandemic in France.

On 28 April 2020, Prime Minister Édouard Philippe announced all sporting events in France, including those behind closed doors, would be banned until September. The FFF were considering whether the final of the Coupe de France could be rescheduled for when events are allowed to restart. On 26 June, the FFF announced that the final was rescheduled to 24 July.

Paris Saint-Germain won the final 1–0 for their 13th Coupe de France title.

== Background ==
Paris Saint-Germain were the runners-up of last year's edition, having lost the 2019 final to Rennes after a penalty shoot-out following a 2–2 draw in extra time.

Saint-Étienne reached the final this year, having lost at the round of 32 of last year's edition to Dijon. This was the first time they reached the final since 1982, a game they lost to Paris Saint-Germain as well.

== Route to the final ==
Paris Saint-Germain		Round	Saint-Étienne
Opponent	Result	2019–20 Coupe de France	Opponent	Result
ESA Linas-Montlhéry	6–0 (A)	Round of 64	FC Bastia-Borgo	3–0 (A)
Lorient	1–0 (A)	Round of 32	Paris FC	3–2 (A)
Pau FC	2–0 (A)	Round of 16	Monaco	1–0 (A)
Dijon	6–1 (A)	Quarter-finals	SAS Épinal	2–1 (A)
Lyon	5–1 (A)	Semi-finals	Rennes	2–1 (H)

Note: H = home fixture, A = away fixture

== Match ==
=== Summary ===
The only goal of the game came in the 14th minute; Kylian Mbappé cut in from the right, with his shot being saved by Saint-Étienne goalkeeper Jessy Moulin, before the rebound fell to Neymar, who shot high to the net off the underside of the crossbar from six yards out.

=== Details ===
24 July 2020
21:10 CEST

Paris Saint-Germain	1–0	Saint-Étienne
Neymar 14'

Stade de France, Saint-Denis
Attendance: 2,805
Referee: Amaury Delerue

Paris Saint-Germain	Saint-Étienne

GK	1	(Costa Rica) Keylor Navas
RB	4	(Germany) Thilo Kehrer		(substituted off) 20'
CB	2	(Brazil) Thiago Silva (c)
CB	5	(Brazil) Marquinhos	(yellow card) 35'
LB	25	(Netherlands) Mitchel Bakker	(yellow card) 29'
RM	11	(Argentina) Ángel Di María
CM	8	(Argentina) Leandro Paredes	(yellow card) 29'	(substituted off) 75'
CM	27	(Senegal) Idrissa Gueye
LM	10	(Brazil) Neymar
CF	18	(Argentina) Mauro Icardi
CF	7	(France) Kylian Mbappé		(substituted off) 33'
Substitutes:
GK	16	(Spain) Sergio Rico
DF	3	(France) Presnel Kimpembe
DF	20	(France) Layvin Kurzawa
DF	31	(France) Colin Dagba		(substituted on) 20'
MF	6	(Italy) Marco Verratti	(yellow card) 31'	(substituted on) 75'
MF	19	(Spain) Pablo Sarabia		(substituted on) 33'
MF	21	(Spain) Ander Herrera
MF	23	(Germany) Julian Draxler
FW	17	(Cameroon) Eric Maxim Choupo-Moting
Manager:
(Germany) Thomas Tuchel

GK	30	(France) Jessy Moulin	(yellow card) 29'
RB	26	(France) Mathieu Debuchy		(substituted off) 83'
CB	3	(France) Wesley Fofana	(yellow card) 90'
CB	24	(France) Loïc Perrin (c)	(red card) 31'
LB	5	(France) Timothée Kolodziejczak
CM	8	(France) Mahdi Camara	(yellow card) 37'	(substituted off) 46'
CM	6	(France) Yann M'Vila	(yellow card) 51'
RW	27	(Guadeloupe) Yvann Maçon	(yellow card) 2'	(substituted off) 34'
AM	7	(Algeria) Ryad Boudebouz		(substituted off) 75'
LW	20	(Gabon) Denis Bouanga
CF	21	(France) Romain Hamouma	(yellow card) 29'	(substituted off) 46'
Substitutes:
GK	1	(France) Stefan Bajic
DF	2	(Cameroon) Harold Moukoudi		(substituted on) 34'
MF	19	(Cameroon) Yvan Neyou		(substituted on) 46'
MF	33	(France) Maxence Rivera
MF	37	(France) Aïmen Moueffek
FW	10	(Tunisia) Wahbi Khazri		(substituted on) 46'
FW	14	(Ivory Coast) Jean-Philippe Krasso		(substituted on) 83'
FW	18	(France) Arnaud Nordin		(substituted on) 75'
FW	29	(France) Charles Abi
Manager:
(France) Claude Puel

Assistant referees:
Bertrand Jouannaud
Philippe Jeanne
Fourth official:
Eric Wattellier
Video assistant referee:
François Letexier
Assistant video assistant referee:
Frank Schneider

Match rules

- 90 minutes.
- 30 minutes of extra time if necessary.
- Penalty shoot-out if scores still level.
- Nine named substitutes.
- Maximum of five substitutions, with a sixth allowed in extra time. (Note: Each team was given only three opportunities to make substitutions, with a fourth opportunity in extra time, excluding substitutions made at half-time, before the start of extra time and at half-time in extra time.)
