= Jérôme Brisard =

French football referee (born 1986)

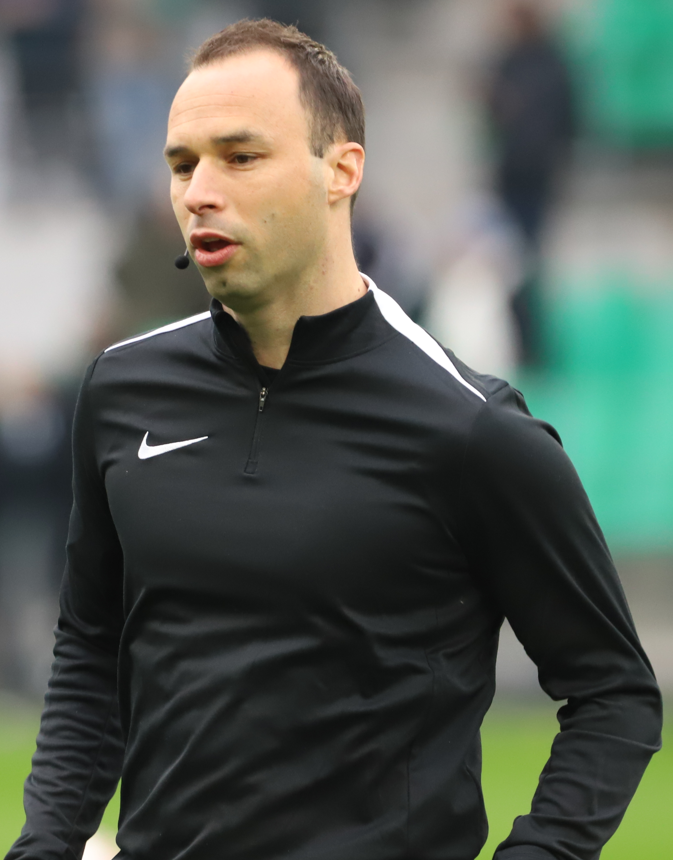
- Brisard in 2025
- Born: 24 March 1986 (age 40); France

Domestic
| Years | League | Role |
| 2015– | Ligue 2 | Referee |
| 2017– | Ligue 1 | Referee |

International
| Years | League | Role |
| 2018– | FIFA listed | Referee |

Jérôme Brisard (born 24 March 1986) is a French football referee who officiates in Ligue 1. He has been a FIFA referee since 2018, and is ranked as a UEFA first category referee.

== Refereeing career ==
In 2015, Brisard began officiating in Ligue 2, before being promoted to Ligue 1 in the second half of the 2016–17 season. He officiated his first Ligue 1 match on 14 January 2017 between Montpellier and Dijon. In 2018, he was put on the FIFA referees list. On 17 February 2018, he officiated a match in the 2017–18 Swiss Super League between Basel and St. Gallen. He officiated his first UEFA competition match on 12 July 2018, a meeting between Albanian club Partizani and Slovenian club Maribor in the 2018–19 UEFA Europa League first qualifying round. He officiated his first senior international match on 15 November 2018 between Israel and Guatemala. On 31 July 2020, Brisard officiated the 2020 Coupe de la Ligue Final between Paris Saint-Germain and Lyon.

On 21 April 2021, Brisard was selected as a video assistant referee for UEFA Euro 2020, to be held across Europe in June and July 2021.

== 2026 FIFA World Cup controversy ==
Brisard served as the video assistant referee (VAR) during the 2026 FIFA World Cup round-of-16 match between Egypt and Argentina on 7 July 2026, working alongside assistant video assistant referee Willy Delajod. The match attracted widespread controversy after Egypt's second goal, scored by Mostafa Ziko, was disallowed following a VAR review that determined a foul had occurred in the attacking phase before the goal.

Following Argentina's 3–2 victory, the Egyptian Football Association lodged a formal complaint with FIFA concerning the officiating, requesting that the referee team be removed from the remainder of the tournament. The federation cited the disallowed goal as well as a late penalty appeal involving Mohamed Salah that was not awarded.

The decisions were widely debated by refereeing experts and football media. Former French international referee Tony Chapron stated that the disallowed goal should have stood and criticized both on-field referee François Letexier and VAR Brisard for the review process.
