= Colin Dagba =

French footballer (born 1998)

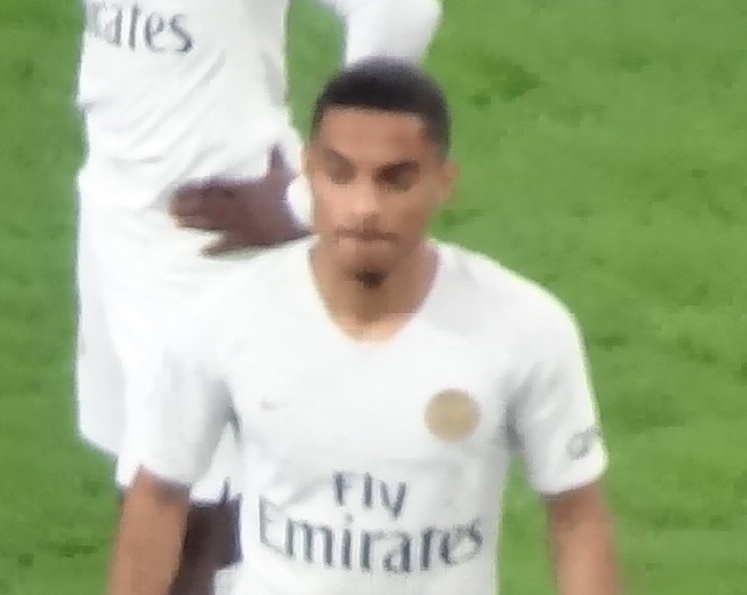
- Dagba with Paris Saint-Germain in 2019

Personal information
- Full name: Colin Obasanya Dagba
- Date of birth: 9 September 1998 (age 28)
- Place of birth: Béthune, France
- Height: 1.70 m (5 ft 7 in)
- Position: Right-back

Team information
- Current team: Carrarese
- Number: 2

Youth career
- 2004–2006: FC Lillers
- 2006–2010: FC La Roupie Isbergues
- 2010–2013: Lens
- 2013–2016: Boulogne
- 2016–2017: Paris Saint-Germain

Senior career*
Years	Team	Apps	(Gls)
2015–2016	Boulogne B	19	(0)
2016	Boulogne	1	(0)
2016–2018	Paris Saint-Germain B	25	(0)
2018–2024	Paris Saint-Germain	55	(1)
2022–2023	→ Strasbourg (loan)	21	(0)
2023–2024	→ Auxerre (loan)	16	(0)
2024–2026	Beerschot	39	(0)
2026–	Carrarese	1	(0)

International career
2019–2021	France U21	16	(1)
- * Club domestic league appearances and goals as of 19 September 2026

Colin Obasanya Dagba (born 9 September 1998) is a French professional footballer who plays as a right-back for Serie B club Carrarese.

== Club career ==
On 3 July 2017, Dagba signed his first professional contract with Ligue 1 club Paris Saint-Germain (PSG), keeping him at the club for three years. He made his professional debut on 4 August 2018, starting in the 2018 Trophée des Champions match against Monaco, which finished as a 4–0 win for PSG.

On 3 October 2019, Dagba signed a contract with PSG lasting until 30 June 2024. His first goal for the Parisian club came in a 3–1 league win against Montpellier on 5 December 2020. In the 2020–21 UEFA Champions League, he started both legs of the quarter-finals between PSG and then-holders Bayern Munich; PSG eventually won the tie on away goals.

On 6 July 2022, Dagba extended his contract with Paris Saint-Germain until 30 June 2025. He subsequently signed for fellow Ligue 1 club Strasbourg on a season-long loan. On 1 September 2023, Dagba joined Ligue 2 side Auxerre on loan for the 2023–24 season.

== Personal life ==
Dagba was born in France and his parents are French and Beninese.

== Career statistics ==
As of match played 10 May 2024

Appearances and goals by club, season and competition
Club	Season	League			Cup		Continental		Other		Total	
Club	Season	Division	Apps	Goals	Apps	Goals	Apps	Goals	Apps	Goals	Apps	Goals
Boulogne B	2015–16	CFA 2	19	0	—		—		—		19	0
Boulogne	2015–16	National	1	0	0	0	—		—		1	0
Paris Saint-Germain B	2016–17	CFA	6	0	—		—		—		6	0
Paris Saint-Germain B	2017–18	National 2	19	0	—		—		—		19	0
Paris Saint-Germain B	Total		25	0	—		—		—		25	0
Paris Saint-Germain	2018–19	Ligue 1	17	0	3	0	1	0	1 (Note: Appearance in Trophée des Champions)	0	22	0
Paris Saint-Germain	2019–20	Ligue 1	10	0	4	0	1	0	1 (Note: Appearance(s) in Coupe de la Ligue)	0	16	0
Paris Saint-Germain	2020–21	Ligue 1	25	1	3	0	5	0	0	0	33	1
Paris Saint-Germain	2021–22	Ligue 1	3	0	3	0	0	0	0	0	6	0
Paris Saint-Germain	Total		55	1	13	0	7	0	2	0	77	1
Strasbourg (loan)	2022–23	Ligue 1	21	0	0	0	—		—		21	0
Auxerre (loan)	2023–24	Ligue 2	16	0	2	0	—		—		18	0
Career total			137	1	15	0	7	0	2	0	161	1

== Honours ==
Paris Saint-Germain

- Ligue 1: 2018–19, 2019–20, 2021–22
- Coupe de France: 2019–20, 2020–21; runner-up: 2018–19
- Coupe de la Ligue: 2019–20
- Trophée des Champions: 2018, 2019
- UEFA Champions League runner-up: 2019–20

Auxerre

- Ligue 2: 2023–24
