= Pedro Herrera (footballer) =

Spanish footballer

Personal information
- Full name: Pedro María Herrera Sancristóbal
- Date of birth: 17 July 1959 (age 67)
- Place of birth: Bilbao, Spain
- Height: 1.77 m (5 ft 10 in)
- Position: Midfielder

Youth career
- Athletic Bilbao

Senior career*
Years	Team	Apps	(Gls)
1978–1981	Erandio		
1981–1982	Salamanca	37	(4)
1982–1988	Zaragoza	155	(18)
1988–1989	Celta	19	(3)
Total		211	(25)
- * Club domestic league appearances and goals

Pedro María Herrera Sancristóbal (born 17 July 1959) is a Spanish former professional footballer who played as a midfielder.

== Career ==
Herrera was born in Bilbao, Biscay. He played youth football with local Athletic Bilbao and made his senior debut with fellow Basque team Erandio, helping the latter achieve promotion from the regional championships to Segunda División B during his three-year spell.

Herrera represented Salamanca, Real Zaragoza and Celta de Vigo professionally, the first club in the Segunda División and the last two in La Liga, where he amassed totals of 174 matches and 21 goals over seven seasons. He retired during the 1989 pre-season after contracting a serious knee injury whilst at the service of the Galicians, and retired from football at only 30 years of age.

After retiring, Herrera worked as general manager for Celta and Zaragoza.

== Personal life ==
Herrera's son Ander was also a professional midfielder.

== Honours ==
Zaragoza

- Copa del Rey: 1985–86
