= Ander Herrera =

Spanish footballer (born 1989)

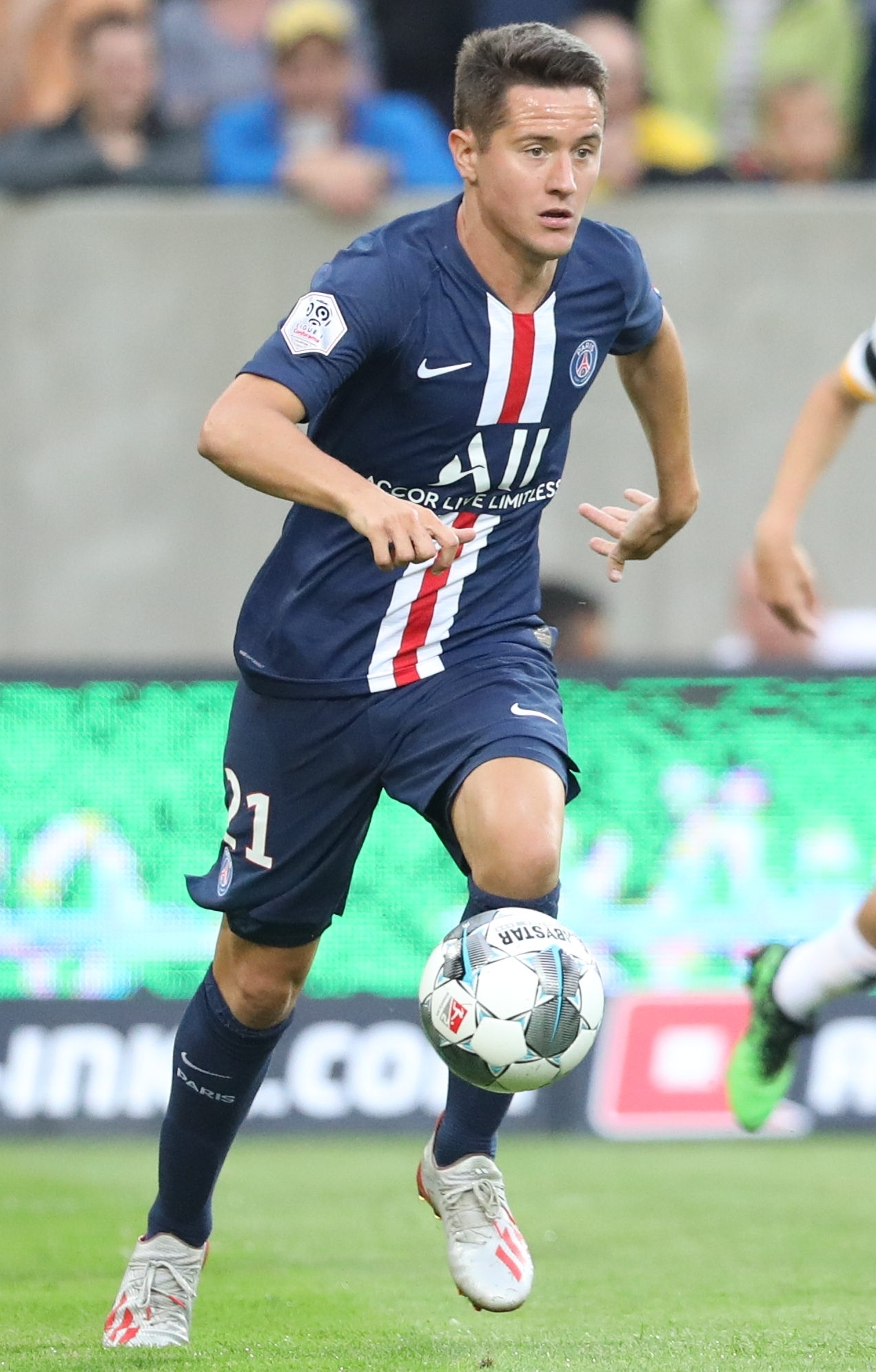
- Herrera playing for Paris Saint-Germain in 2019

Personal information
- Full name: Ander Herrera Agüera
- Date of birth: 14 August 1989 (age 37)
- Place of birth: Bilbao, Spain
- Height: 1.82 m (6 ft 0 in)
- Position: Midfielder

Team information
- Current team: Zaragoza
- Number: 8

Youth career
- 2001–2008: Zaragoza

Senior career*
Years	Team	Apps	(Gls)
2008–2009	Zaragoza B	10	(2)
2009–2011	Zaragoza	82	(6)
2011–2014	Athletic Bilbao	94	(7)
2014–2019	Manchester United	132	(12)
2019–2022	Paris Saint-Germain	58	(5)
2022–2025	Athletic Bilbao	48	(0)
2025–2026	Boca Juniors	23	(0)
2026–	Zaragoza	6	(0)

International career
2009	Spain U20	10	(3)
2009–2011	Spain U21	15	(4)
2012	Spain Olympic	5	(0)
2016–2017	Spain	2	(0)
Medal record
Men's football
Representing Spain
UEFA European Under-21 Championship
Winner	2011 Denmark
- * Club domestic league appearances and goals as of 31 October 2026

Ander Herrera Agüera (Spanish pronunciation: [ˈandeɾ eˈreɾa aˈɣweɾa]; born 14 August 1989) is a Spanish professional footballer who plays for Zaragoza in the Primera Federación – Group 2.

Herrera began his career at Zaragoza, before moving to Athletic Bilbao in 2011 and then to Manchester United for €36 million in 2014. With the English club, he won the FA Cup, FA Community Shield, EFL Cup and UEFA Europa League (in which he was named man of the match in the final), and was named as their player of the year for the 2016–17 season. He moved to Paris Saint-Germain (PSG) in 2019, winning the domestic quadruple and starting in the UEFA Champions League final against Bayern Munich in his first season, where PSG lost 1–0. At PSG, Herrera won Ligue 1, the Coupe de France, and the Trophée des Champions all twice, and the Coupe de la Ligue once. In 2022, he returned to Athletic Bilbao, first on loan before a permanent move in January 2023, he was part of the 2023–24 Copa del Rey winning squad with Bilbao.

Herrera has won tournaments with Spain at under-20 and under-21 level, and represented his nation at the 2012 Summer Olympics. He made his senior international debut for Spain in November 2016, but would only ever make two appearances, his final one being in March 2017.

== Club career ==
=== Zaragoza ===
Born in Bilbao, Basque Country, Herrera began his career at Real Zaragoza and made his professional debut in the Segunda División in the 2008–09 season. He made 19 appearances that season as the Aragonese club made an immediate return to La Liga. He made his top-flight debut on 29 August 2009, in a 1–0 home win against Tenerife.

During the 2009–10 campaign, Herrera was one of Zaragoza's most used players as the club managed to retain its top-flight status. He scored his first league goal on 6 December, but in a 4–1 away defeat to Mallorca.

In 2010–11, Herrera continued to feature regularly for Zaragoza, under both José Aurelio Gay and his successor Javier Aguirre.

=== Athletic Bilbao ===
On 7 February 2011, Herrera agreed to join Athletic Bilbao on a five-year contract for a reported €7.5 million effective as of 1 July. Buyout clauses were set at €36 million in his first three seasons and €40 million in the remainder.

Herrera made his official debut for Athletic Bilbao on 18 August 2011, playing the full 90 minutes in a 0–0 home draw against Trabzonspor in the 2011–12 UEFA Europa League. He appeared in 54 official matches and scored four goals in his first season with the Basque club, who reached the finals of both the Copa del Rey and the Europa League. In his third and final season he played 33 league games as Athletic qualified for the UEFA Champions League for the first time in 16 years.

=== Manchester United ===
==== 2014–15 season ====
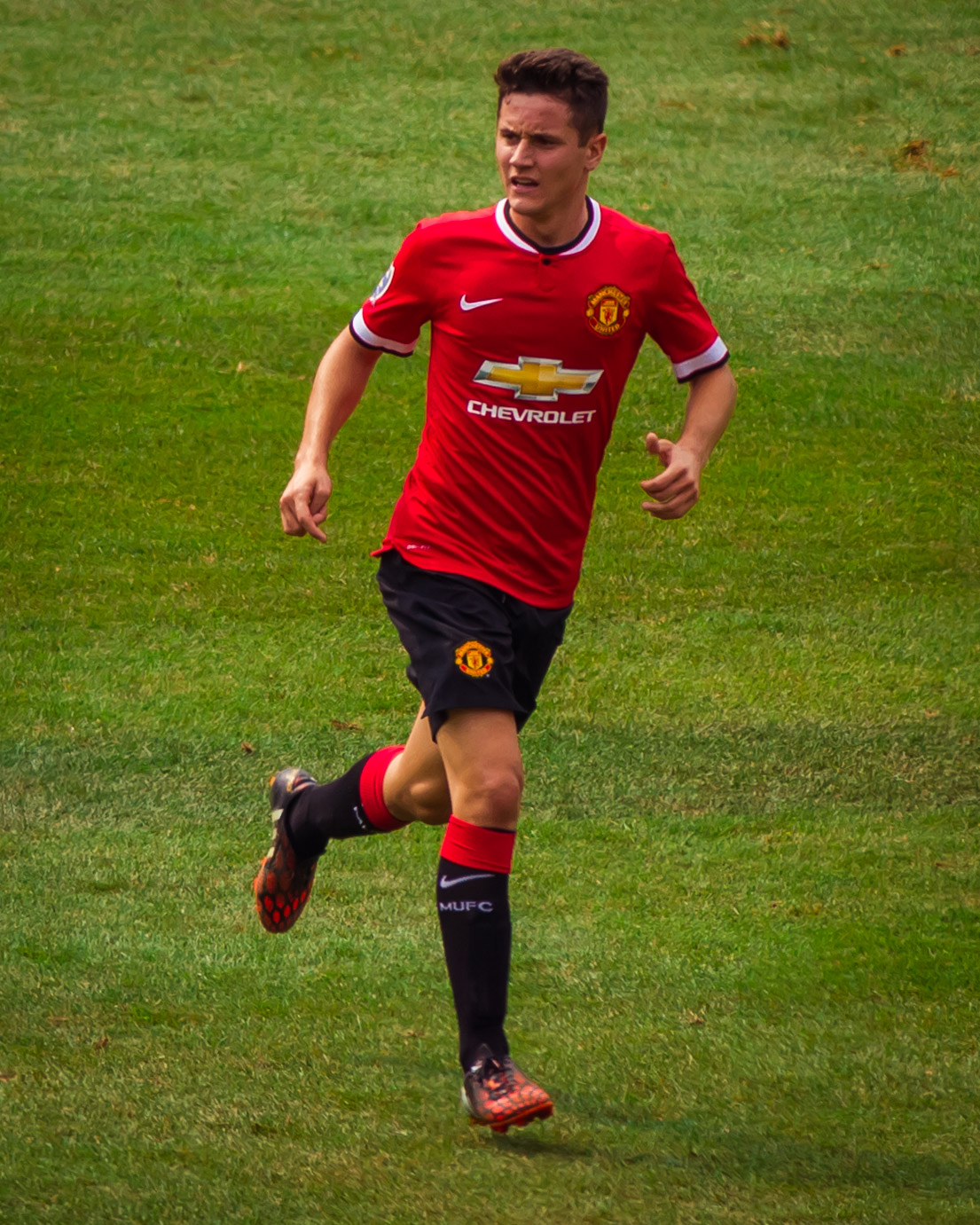
Herrera playing for Manchester United in 2014

Herrera was the subject of a £24 million offer from Manchester United in August 2013, but the bid was rejected by Athletic Bilbao. A year later, Manchester United tried to sign him again. On 26 June 2014, Athletic announced on their official website that they had rejected a €36 million (£28.85 million) bid from Manchester United for Herrera. Athletic Bilbao later confirmed that Herrera had activated his buyout clause, allowing United to sign him. Manchester United announced on the same day they had completed the signing of Herrera on a four-year contract, pending the receipt of an International Transfer Certificate.

Herrera made his debut in the opening game of the Premier League season on 16 August, a 2–1 home defeat to Swansea City. He played 67 minutes before being substituted for Marouane Fellaini. Herrera picked up an injury during training and missed Manchester United's next two games against Sunderland and Burnley. In his first game back after returning from injury, against Queens Park Rangers on 14 September 2014, he scored his first goal for the club and made an assist as Manchester United won the game 4–0. He scored again in United's next game, flicking in Ángel Di María's shot with his heel in their 5–3 defeat to newly promoted Leicester City on 21 September.

Herrera scored his first FA Cup goal with a dipping effort in a third round tie against Yeovil Town on 4 January 2015. Herrera followed his cup goal against Yeovil with an important equalising goal against Preston North End in the FA Cup fifth round; United would go on to win the tie 3–1 and progress to the quarter final stage. Herrera started a Premier League game for the first time since 2 December against Swansea City, scoring United's only goal – his fifth of the season – in a 2–1 defeat. On 4 April, Herrera scored the first brace of his career to help United beat Aston Villa 3–1; he was also named man of the match for his performances.

==== 2015–16 season ====
On 26 August 2015, in his first start of the season, he provided an assist for Wayne Rooney's second goal and scored the fourth goal in a 4–0 win (7–1 aggregate) over Belgian side Club Brugge in the second leg of their Champions League play-off. He scored his second goal of the season from the penalty spot in Manchester United's 3–1 home win over Liverpool on 12 September. His good form continued with a man-of-the-match performance in a 3–0 win against Everton at Goodison Park, in which he scored United's second – heading in from a Marcos Rojo cross, and assisting Rooney's goal in the second half.

On 25 February 2016, Herrera scored his first European goal at Old Trafford – a powerfully converted penalty in the latter stages of a 5–1 win over Midtjylland, in the Round of 32 of the Europa League. Later that week, on 28 February, Herrera scored the winning goal in a 3–2 victory over Arsenal. On 23 April, Herrera featured in United's triumph in the FA Cup Semi-final over Everton at Wembley; on as an 87th-minute substitute for Marouane Fellaini with the score tied at 1–1, Herrera played a one-two with Anthony Martial, sending the Frenchman through on goal to score a dramatic injury-time winner to seal a 2–1 win and send United through to the final. United went on to beat Crystal Palace 2–1 in the final, securing the cup and Herrera's first major honour with United.

==== 2016–17 season ====
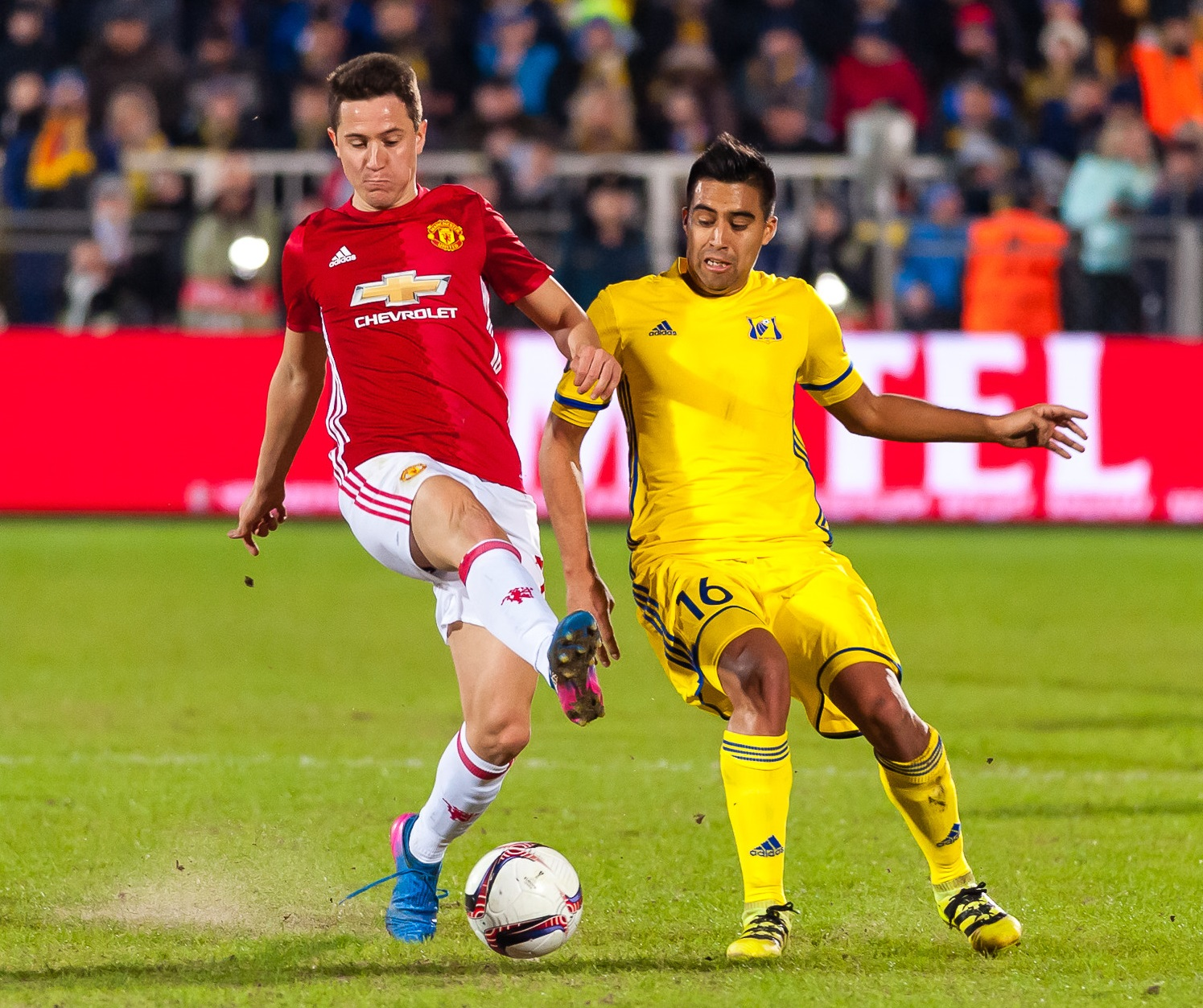
Herrera (left) playing for Manchester United in 2017

Herrera's role initially remained limited to substitute appearances under new manager, José Mourinho, with Fellaini preferred in midfield alongside world record signing Paul Pogba. Herrera did, however, start in United's League Cup third round tie versus Northampton Town, and duly registered his first goal of the 2016–17 campaign in his side's 3–1 victory. He was subsequently retained in the starting line-up for the Premier League game against champions Leicester City, and helped his side register a comfortable 4–1 win. Herrera was roundly lauded for his performances both against Leicester City and in the games that followed, and was named man of the match for helping Manchester United restrict free-scoring Liverpool to a 0–0 draw at Anfield.

On 26 February, he was named in the starting XI for the 2017 EFL Cup Final win against Southampton at Wembley, and contributed an assist for Zlatan Ibrahimović's second goal of the match which gave United a 3–2 lead and eventually proved to be the winning goal and secured Herrera's second major trophy with United. Having been sent off against Chelsea on 13 March at Stamford Bridge in their FA Cup quarter-final match, he turned in a man of the match display on 16 April against the same team at Old Trafford in the Premier League by shackling Eden Hazard, assisting Marcus Rashford for the first goal, then himself getting on the scoresheet with the second goal for a 2–0 win which kept United in the hunt for a top-four finish and extended their unbeaten run to twenty-two matches.

On 18 May 2017, Herrera was presented with the Sir Matt Busby Player of the Year award. After helping Manchester United win the 2017 UEFA Europa League Final on 24 May, Herrera was awarded the game's man of the match accolade, which he dedicated to victims of the Manchester Arena bombing that occurred a few days earlier.

==== 2017–18 season ====
Herrera's chances of playing looked to be diminishing with the arrival of Nemanja Matić, but he remained with the team and fought for his place. On 26 January 2018, he scored his first goal of the season in a 4–0 FA Cup fourth round win against Yeovil Town. On 21 April, he scored the winning goal in a 2–1 win over Tottenham in the FA Cup semi-final at Wembley.

==== 2018–19 season ====
Following the November international break, Herrera was part of Manchester United's starting eleven to play Southampton. The match saw Herrera score his first goal of the season, being the equaliser in the 2–2 draw. Herrera also started in United's midweek game against Arsenal where he provided the assist for United's first goal by Martial. Herrera started in United's first match with Ole Gunnar Solskjær as manager, which saw Herrera score the second goal of the match which saw United beat Cardiff City 5–1. On 18 February 2019, Herrera scored the first in a 2–0 win over Chelsea, securing United's place in the sixth round of the FA Cup. On 1 March, Herrera was announced as Manchester United's February player of the month.

On 11 May 2019, it was confirmed that Herrera would be leaving United at the end of the season.

=== Paris Saint-Germain ===
On 4 July 2019, Herrera had signed a five-year contract with Ligue 1 champions Paris Saint-Germain (PSG). On 14 September, he made his league debut for PSG, coming on as a substitute for Pablo Sarabia in a 1–0 win over Strasbourg. Herrera scored his first goal for the club in a 4–4 league draw against Amiens on 15 February 2020. In his first season at PSG, Herrera won the Ligue 1, the Coupe de France, the Coupe de la Ligue, the Trophée des Champions, and was runner-up in the UEFA Champions League. In his second season in Paris, Herrera scored one goal in 45 matches as the club won the Coupe de France, the Trophée des Champions, and reached the semi-finals of the Champions League.

On 11 September 2021, Herrera scored a brace in a 4–0 league win over Clermont, the second brace of his career. Four days later, he scored his first Champions League goal in the competition proper, a low-driven, left-footed shot from the middle of the penalty area in a 1–1 draw against Club Brugge.

=== Return to Athletic Bilbao ===
On 27 August 2022, Herrera returned to Athletic Bilbao on loan. A day later he was presented, with the number 23, at San Mamés in front of 2,000 fans. On 17 September he made his second debut as a Lion in a home victory over Rayo Vallecano, replacing Oihan Sancet. On 18 October in his first start, he provided a backheel pass to Iñaki Williams to score in the first minute of the fixture against Getafe.

On 31 January 2023, Athletic exercised their purchase option at no cost. On 2 March, he issued a statement expressing his concern about the continuous muscle injuries he was suffering throughout the season which were preventing him from having a sustained run of games. On 22 April, after three months without starting, he was in the lineup in a win over Almería. In his second season, he was part of the squad which won the Copa del Rey, although he was an unused substitute in the final against Mallorca. On 13 June 2024, he extended his contract until 2025.

=== Boca Juniors ===
On 17 January 2025, Athletic Bilbao and Boca Juniors reached an agreement on the transfer of Herrera. Herrera terminated his contract with the club in June 2026.

=== Return to Zaragoza ===
On 14 July 2026, Herrera returned to boyhood club Zaragoza in the Primera Federación.

== International career ==
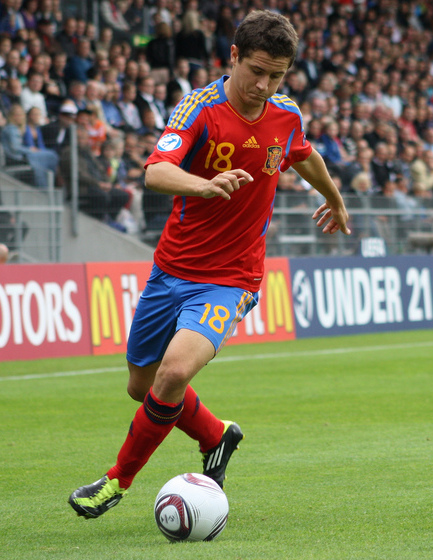
Herrera playing for Spain U21s in 2011

Herrera was a member of the Spain under-20 squad which won gold in football at the 2009 Mediterranean Games in Pescara, Italy.

Herrera was selected by Spain under-21 coach Luis Milla for the 2011 UEFA European Under-21 Championship in Denmark. On 12 June, in the group stage opener against England, he scored a controversial goal in an eventual 1–1 draw. In the final against Switzerland, through another header, Herrera netted the first goal in an eventual 2–0 win in Aarhus. He played for Spain at the 2012 Summer Olympics.

He received his first senior call-up on 3 October 2016, for 2018 World Cup qualification fixtures against Italy and Albania, but did not feature in either game. He made his senior international debut against England, at Wembley, on 15 November 2016, coming on as a second-half substitute in a 2–2 draw.

== Style of play ==
During his time at Manchester United, Herrera's style of play led to comparisons with Paul Scholes, and he was even praised by Scholes himself as the club's best signing of the 2014 summer transfer window. He is a combative, box-to-box midfielder, known for his assured passing and high energy on the field, as well as his movement, tactical intelligence, ability to read the game, and technique, attributes which allow him to be deployed in several midfield positions, including as number six, as a number eight, or as number ten.

== Personal life ==
Herrera's father, Pedro Herrera, was also a footballer who played as a midfielder. He also played for Real Zaragoza, as well as for Celta, and served as general manager at both clubs. Herrera has two children with his wife, Isabel Collado.

== Career statistics ==
=== Club ===
As of match played 31 October 2026

Appearances and goals by club, season and competition
Club	Season	League			National cup (Note: Includes Copa del Rey, FA Cup, Coupe de France, Copa Argentina)		League cup (Note: Includes Football League/EFL Cup, Coupe de la Ligue)		Continental		Other		Total	
Club	Season	Division	Apps	Goals	Apps	Goals	Apps	Goals	Apps	Goals	Apps	Goals	Apps	Goals
Zaragoza B	2008–09	Tercera División	10	2	—		—		—		—		10	2
Zaragoza	2008–09	Segunda División	19	2	0	0	—		—		—		19	2
Zaragoza	2009–10	La Liga	30	2	2	0	—		—		—		32	2
Zaragoza	2010–11	La Liga	33	2	2	0	—		—		—		35	2
Zaragoza	Total		82	6	4	0	—		—		—		86	6
Athletic Bilbao	2011–12	La Liga	32	1	9	2	—		13 (Note: Appearances in UEFA Europa League)	1	—		54	4
Athletic Bilbao	2012–13	La Liga	29	1	2	0	—		4	1	—		35	2
Athletic Bilbao	2013–14	La Liga	33	5	6	0	—		—		—		39	5
Athletic Bilbao	Total		94	7	17	2	—		17	2	—		128	11
Manchester United	2014–15	Premier League	26	6	5	2	0	0	—		—		31	8
Manchester United	2015–16	Premier League	27	3	6	0	1	0	7 (Note: Four appearances and one goal in UEFA Champions League, three appearances and one goal in UEFA Europa League)	2	—		41	5
Manchester United	2016–17	Premier League	31	1	3	0	6	1	9	0	1 (Note: Appearance in FA Community Shield)	0	50	2
Manchester United	2017–18	Premier League	26	0	4	2	2	0	6 (Note: Appearances in UEFA Champions League)	0	1 (Note: Appearance in UEFA Super Cup)	0	39	2
Manchester United	2018–19	Premier League	22	2	3	1	1	0	2	0	—		28	3
Manchester United	Total		132	12	21	5	10	1	24	2	2	0	189	20
Paris Saint-Germain	2019–20	Ligue 1	8	1	4	0	3	0	6	0	1 (Note: Appearance in Trophée des Champions)	0	22	1
Paris Saint-Germain	2020–21	Ligue 1	31	1	3	0	—		10	0	1	0	45	1
Paris Saint-Germain	2021–22	Ligue 1	19	3	2	0	—		6	1	1	0	28	4
Paris Saint-Germain	Total		58	5	9	0	3	0	22	1	3	0	95	6
Athletic Bilbao	2022–23 (Note: Part of this season was spent on loan from Paris Saint-Germain)	La Liga	17	0	3	0	—		—		—		20	0
Athletic Bilbao	2023–24	La Liga	23	0	4	0	—		—		—		27	0
Athletic Bilbao	2024–25	La Liga	8	0	1	0	—		5	0	0	0	14	0
Athletic Bilbao	Total		48	0	8	0	—		5	0	0	0	61	0
Boca Juniors	2025	Primera División	14	0	1	0	—		1 (Note: Appearances in Copa Libertadores)	0	1 (Note: Appearance in FIFA Club World Cup)	0	17	0
Boca Juniors	2026	Primera División	9	0	0	0	—		3	1	—		12	1
Boca Juniors	Total		23	0	1	0	—		4	1	1	0	29	1
Zaragoza	2026–27	Primera Federación	6	0	0	0	—		—		—		6	0
Career total			453	32	60	7	13	1	72	6	6	0	604	46

=== International ===
As of match played 28 March 2017

Appearances and goals by national team and year
National team	Year	Apps	Goals
Spain	2016	1	0
Spain	2017	1	0
Total		2	0

== Honours ==
Manchester United

- FA Cup: 2015–16; runner-up: 2017–18
- EFL Cup: 2016–17
- FA Community Shield: 2016
- UEFA Europa League: 2016–17

Paris Saint-Germain

- Ligue 1: 2019–20, 2021–22
- Coupe de France: 2019–20, 2020–21
- Coupe de la Ligue: 2019–20
- Trophée des Champions: 2019, 2020
- UEFA Champions League runner-up: 2019–20

Athletic Bilbao

- Copa del Rey: 2023–24; runner-up: 2011–12
- UEFA Europa League: runner-up: 2011–12

Boca Juniors

- Argentine Primera División: 2026 Liga

Spain U20

- Mediterranean Games: 2009

Spain U21

- UEFA European Under-21 Championship: 2011

Individual

- UEFA European Under-21 Championship Team of the Tournament: 2011
- Sir Matt Busby Player of the Year: 2016–17
- UEFA Europa League Squad of the Season: 2016–17
