= Giovanni Kean =

Italian footballer

Personal information
- Full name: Giovanni Kean Dossè
- Date of birth: 25 July 1993 (age 33)
- Place of birth: Vercelli, Italy
- Height: 1.83 m (6 ft 0 in)
- Position: Forward

Youth career
- –2012: Pro Vercelli

Senior career*
Years	Team	Apps	(Gls)
2012–2013	Asti	11	(0)
2014	Savona	0	(0)
2014	Vado	15	(1)
2014–2015	Acqui	13	(0)
2015–2016	Giulianova	6	(1)
2016	Finale	2	(0)
2016–2017	PDHA	0	(0)
2017–2018	Roccella	4	(0)
2018	Sancataldese	6	(1)
2018–2019	Rieti	12	(0)
2019–2020	Castrovillari	8	(0)
2020–2021	Termoli		
2021–2022	Pennarossa		
2022	Albese		
2022–2023	Nola	16	(0)
2024–2025	Asti	26	(1)
2025	Poggibonsi	10	(0)
- * Club domestic league appearances and goals as of 30 November 2025

Giovanni Kean Dossè (Italian pronunciation: [dʒoˈvanni ˈkɛn] or [- ˈkin]; born 25 July 1993) is an Italian professional footballer who plays as a striker.

== Early and personal life ==
Kean was born in Vercelli to Ivorian parents Biorou and Isabelle. His younger brother, Moise, is also a footballer.

== Career ==
Kean played for Pro Vercelli, Asti, Savona, Vado, Acqui, Giulianova, Finale, PDHA, Roccella and Sancataldese, making over 40 appearances in Serie D, before going professional with Serie C club Rieti in July 2018. He was released from his Rieti contract by mutual consent on 29 January 2019. Kean remained without club until December 2019, where he joined Serie D club Castrovillari. In December 2020 he signed for Eccellenza amateurs Termoli. He left Termoli by the end of the season.

In July 2021 he was announced as a new player of Sanmarinese club Pennarossa.
