= Julian Draxler =

German footballer (born 1993)

- Draxler playing for Paris Saint-Germain in 2019

Personal information
- Full name: Julian Draxler
- Date of birth: 20 September 1993 (age 33)
- Place of birth: Gladbeck, Germany
- Height: 1.85 m (6 ft 1 in)
- Positions: Attacking midfielder; winger

Team information
- Current team: Al Ahli
- Number: 7

Youth career
- 1998–2000: BV Rentfort
- 2000–2001: SSV Buer 07/28
- 2001–2011: Schalke 04

Senior career*
Years	Team	Apps	(Gls)
2011–2015	Schalke 04	119	(18)
2015–2017	VfL Wolfsburg	34	(5)
2017–2023	Paris Saint-Germain	131	(17)
2022–2023	→ Benfica (loan)	10	(1)
2023–	Al Ahli	52	(27)

International career
2010–2011	Germany U18	8	(1)
2011	Germany U19	2	(1)
2011	Germany U21	1	(1)
2012–2022	Germany	58	(7)
Medal record
Men's football
Representing Germany
FIFA World Cup
Winner	2014 Brazil
FIFA Confederations Cup
Winner	2017 Russia
- * Club domestic league appearances and goals as of 15:58, 16 September 2026 (UTC)

Julian Draxler (born 20 September 1993) is a German professional footballer who plays as an attacking midfielder or winger for Qatar Stars League club Al Ahli.

He made his Bundesliga debut for Schalke 04 aged 17 in January 2011, and in May of that year scored the first goal as the side won the DFB-Pokal final. In total, he played 171 competitive matches for Schalke, scoring 30 goals, before transferring to VfL Wolfsburg in 2015. In January 2017, he joined Paris Saint-Germain.

A former international with over 50 caps since 2012, Draxler had represented the Germany national team at youth and senior level. He was also a part of the Germany squad that won the 2014 FIFA World Cup, reached the semi-finals of UEFA Euro 2016 and was the captain of the side that won the 2017 FIFA Confederations Cup, a tournament in which Draxler was awarded the Golden Ball trophy as the best player of the competition.

== Club career ==
=== Schalke 04 ===
Draxler made his Bundesliga debut on 15 January 2011 in a 0–1 loss to Hamburger SV. At that time, he was the fourth-youngest Bundesliga player ever and the youngest in Schalke's history. One week later, in Schalke's 1–0 win against Hannover 96, he became the second-youngest field player after Nuri Şahin to start a Bundesliga match.

On 25 January 2011, Julian Draxler came on as a substitute for Peer Kluge in the quarter-finals of the 2010–11 DFB-Pokal against 1. FC Nürnberg in the second half of extra time. He scored his first goal for Schalke 04 in the dying seconds of the same match to ensure a 3–2 for his club. He scored his first Bundesliga goal on 1 April 2011 against FC St. Pauli. Draxler opened the scoring in Schalke's 2011 DFB-Pokal final victory over MSV Duisburg, volleying in from outside the area, scoring the first of what proved to be five unanswered goals for Schalke. He finished the 2010–11 season with 1 goal in 15 league appearances, two goals in three DFB-Pokal appearances and six UEFA Champions League appearances.

In the 2011–12 season, Draxler played an important part in securing third place and 2011–12 UEFA Champions League qualification for Schalke, appearing in 30 of 34 Bundesliga matches, mainly on the left side of midfield to accommodate Lewis Holtby in a central role. He also had a goal in two DFB-Pokal matches, two goals in the UEFA Europa League, and an appearance in the DFL-Supercup.

The following season, Draxler continued to prove himself to be an important first team player, scoring in matches against Greuther Fürth, Werder Bremen, Borussia Mönchengladbach and in a high-scoring 5–4 victory against Hannover 96. Draxler continued to play an important role after Holtby's departure and the signing of Michel Bastos, allowing Draxler to impress in his favoured attacking midfield position, including two goals in a 4–1 victory at VfL Wolfsburg. While scoring in a 2–1 win to complete a league double over rivals Borussia Dortmund, Draxler became Schalke's youngest ever player to appear in 100 competitive games. On 3 May, he scored the match's only goal as Schalke defeated Borussia Mönchengladbach 1–0 at Borussia-Park. Draxler finished the 2012–13 season as Schalke's joint top goalscorer in the Bundesliga – along with striker Klaas-Jan Huntelaar – after finishing the season with ten goals. He also scored two goals in three DFB-Pokal matches and one goal in six UEFA Champions League matches.

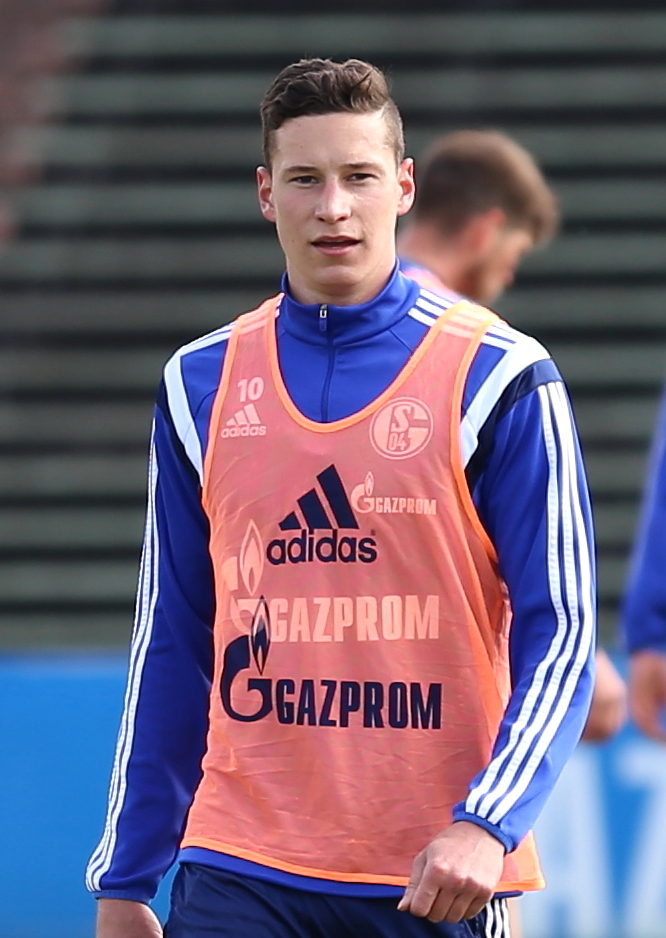
Draxler training for Schalke 04 in 2015.

In May 2013, amid rumours of interest from English Premier League clubs as well as from Borussia Dortmund, Draxler extended his contract for a further two years, until 30 June 2018. On 2 October 2013, Draxler scored in a 1–0 away win against Basel in the 2013–14 UEFA Champions League. This win took Schalke 04 to the top of their group. In the final match of the Champions League group stage, Draxler opened the scoring for Schalke in a 2–0 victory against Basel, taking them through to the knockout phase of the tournament. He finished the 2013–14 season with 2 goals in 26 appearances in the Bundesliga, two appearances in the DFB-Pokal and four goals in ten appearances in the Champions League.

He would go on to score 2 goals in 19 appearances in all competitions in the following season.

On 27 July 2015, Schalke rejected a bid of €15 million from Juventus, after reports that the Italian side and Draxler had already agreed personal terms. Schalke general manager Horst Heldt felt the offer was far too low and informed Juventus that there would be no further talks. On 31 August 2015, Draxler signed for VfL Wolfsburg. His final match was a 3–0 loss to Wolfsburg three days prior to the transfer. He finished his 2015–16 account for Schalke with one goal in three Bundesliga matches and a DFB-Pokal match.

=== VfL Wolfsburg ===
On 31 August 2015, Draxler signed for VfL Wolfsburg on a five-year deal for a reported initial fee of €36 million plus add-ons. He scored his first goal for Wolfsburg on 15 September 2015, in a 1–0 win over CSKA Moscow on his Champions League debut for the club. On 31 October, he registered his first Bundesliga goal with the Wolves, scoring the winner after appearing as a substitute against Bayer Leverkusen.

In the knockout phase of the 2015–16 Champions League, against Gent, Draxler scored twice in a 3–2 away win in the first leg. On 8 March in the second leg at the Volkswagen Arena, he assisted André Schürrle for the only goal of the match as Wolfsburg reached the quarter-finals for the first time in club history. However, media sources reported that Draxler had failed to fulfill expectations with the Wolves and often appeared like a "foreign body" in the team. He ended the 2015–16 season with 8 goals and 7 assists from 28 appearances.

Ahead of the 2016–17 season, Draxler announced that he wished to leave VfL Wolfsburg and that the club would allow him to transfer if it received an attractive offer. Despite reported interest from Arsenal and Paris Saint-Germain, Draxler could not secure a transfer away from Wolfsburg during the summer transfer window. On his return to the Wolfsburg team, Draxler was loudly booed by the club's supporters and described the following four months as "the worst first half of a season of my career".

=== Paris Saint-Germain ===
On 24 December 2016, it was announced on VfL Wolfsburg's website that Draxler would be joining Paris Saint-Germain on a four-year contract, for a reported fee of €42 million, pending a medical examination. The transfer was officially completed on 3 January 2017.

On 7 January, Draxler made his competitive debut for PSG in a Coupe de France fixture against Bastia at the Parc des Princes. He scored the final goal of a 7–0 victory in the 89th minute, after being assisted by Hatem Ben Arfa. Draxler debuted in Ligue 1 seven days later and scored the match's only goal as the champions won 1–0 away at Rennes. On 1 February, he scored twice against the same opposition in the Coupe de France to take him to four goals in five appearances in French football.

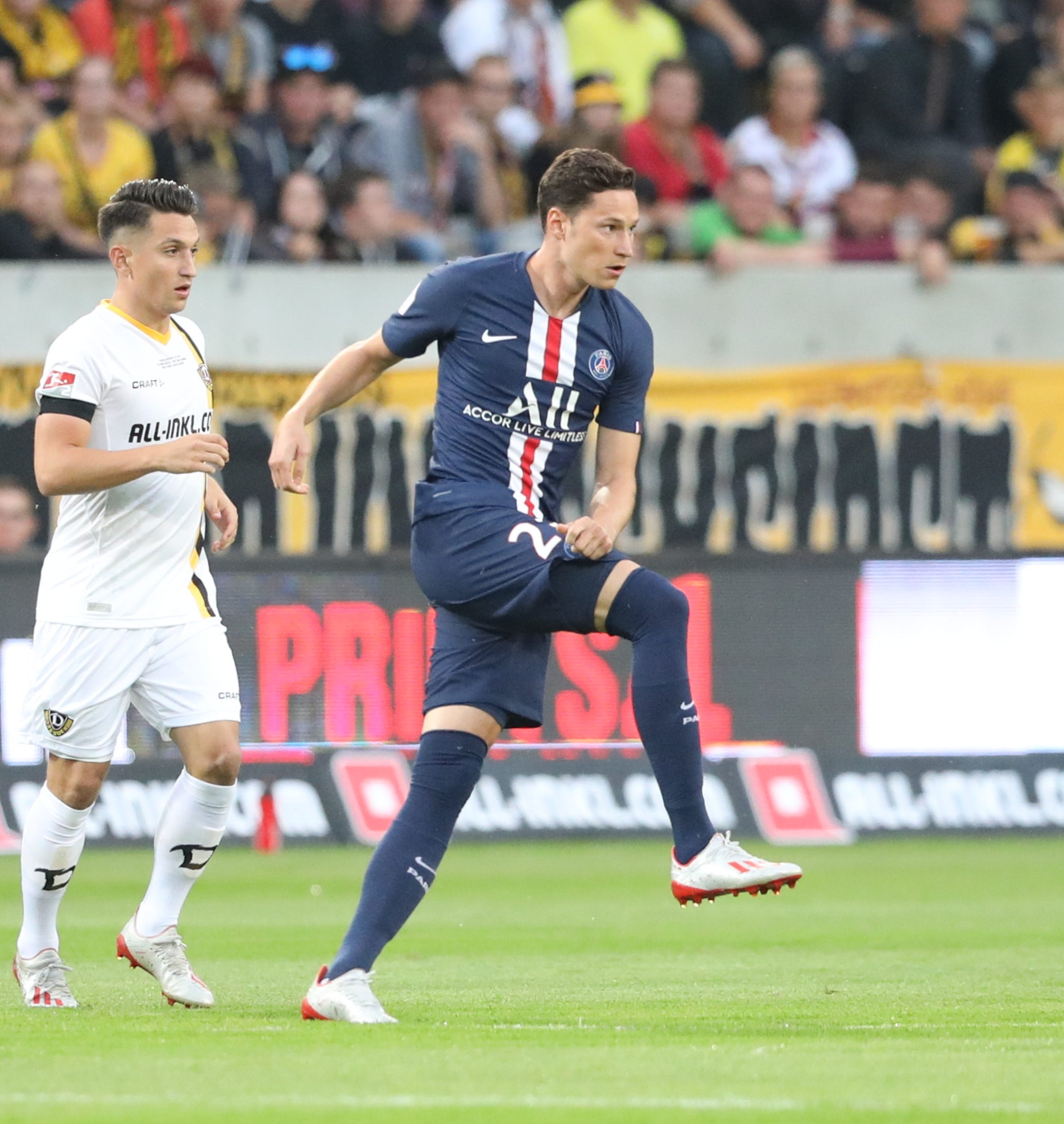
Draxler in action with PSG during a friendly match against Dynamo Dresden in July 2019.

On 14 February, Draxler scored on his first Champions League appearance for PSG, a 4–0 home win over Barcelona in the round of 16. On 26 February, he scored after appearing as a substitute in PSG's 5–1 win against rivals Marseille in Le Classique at the Stade Vélodrome. On 1 April, Draxler scored the opening goal in PSG's 4–1 win over Monaco in the 2017 Coupe de la Ligue final.

Between 2018 and 2020, Draxler won three Ligue 1, three Coupe de France, and three Coupe de la Ligue titles. He also played in the 2020 UEFA Champions League final, which PSG lost 1–0 against Bayern Munich.

Draxler scored his first goal of the 2020–21 season in a 1–0 win against Metz on 16 September 2020. This was his first goal since the 2018–19 season. In a 4–0 victory against Dijon on 24 October, Draxler suffered a hamstring injury; he made his return on 16 December in a 2–0 win over Lorient. In May 2021, he extended his contract with PSG until 2024.

==== Loan to Benfica ====
Draxler joined Benfica on a season-long loan for a reported fee of €2.5 million on transfer deadline day, 1 September 2022. He made his Primeira Liga debut nine days later, featuring in Benfica's 1–0 away win against Famalicão. He scored his first goal on 18 September, closing a 5–0 home win over Marítimo.

=== Al Ahli ===
On 16 September 2023, Draxler arrived in Doha, Qatar, to complete his transfer to Qatar Stars League club Al Ahli. Two days later, he signed a two-year contract with the side.

== International career ==
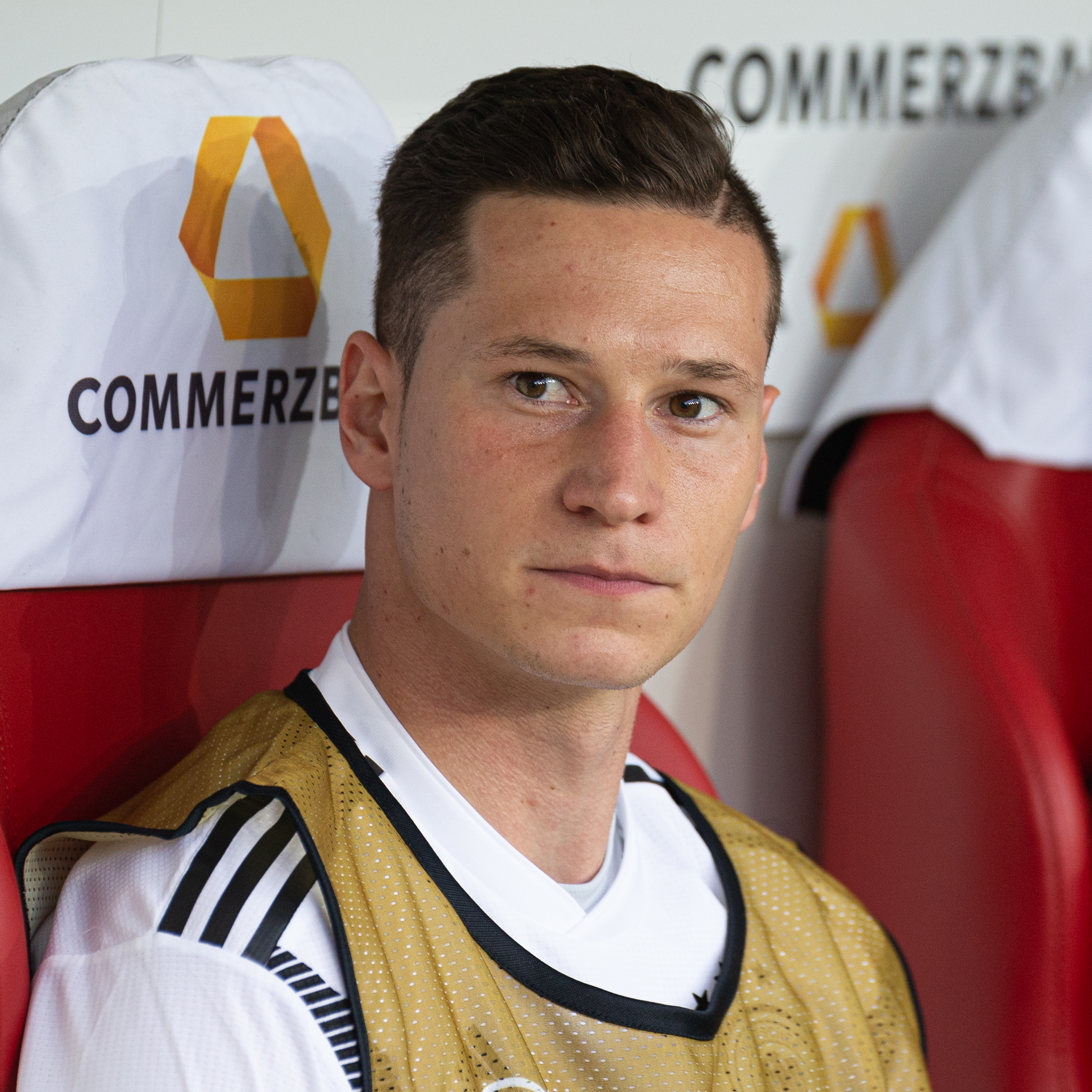
Draxler with Germany in June 2019

On 9 August 2011, Draxler scored on his debut for the Germany under-21 side in the 4–1 win over Cyprus in a 2013 UEFA European Under-21 Championship qualifier.

On 7 May 2012, he was one of two uncapped players called up into the provisional squad for the UEFA Euro 2012 senior side for Germany. On 26 May 2012, he made his debut for the senior side in Germany's 5–3 loss to Switzerland, coming on as a substitute to replace Lukas Podolski in the 62nd minute. His first international goal was scored on 2 June 2013 in a friendly against the United States. The goal was scored in the 81st minute to bring the score to 3–4, finishing a rebound off goalkeeper Tim Howard.

On 13 May 2014, Draxler captained Germany in a goalless friendly against Poland in Hamburg, a match in which seven of his teammates were debutants.

In June 2014, Draxler was named in Germany's 23-man squad for the 2014 FIFA World Cup. He made his first World Cup appearance as a 76th-minute substitute for Sami Khedira in the semi-final 7–1 victory over Brazil. On 13 July, he was an unused substitute as Germany defeated Argentina at the Maracanã Stadium to win its fourth World Cup.

Draxler made only two appearances for the world champions during the Euro 2016 qualifying campaign. However, he started on the left side of Germany's attack in four of their six matches at Euro 2016 finals, also appearing as a substitute in the quarter-final against Italy and converting his kick in the 6–5 penalty shootout win. He was named Man of the Match for his performance against Slovakia, assisting Mario Gómez's second goal before scoring the third himself in a 3–0 win.

Draxler was named captain of an inexperienced Germany squad for the 2017 FIFA Confederations Cup, scoring a penalty kick in the team's opening match as they defeated Australia 3–2. Following Germany's title win, Draxler was awarded the Golden Ball as best player of the tournament.

On 4 June 2018, Germany's manager Joachim Löw named Draxler in his final 23-man squad for the 2018 FIFA World Cup in Russia. On 17 June, Draxler made a World Cup appearance during their opening match against Mexico in which the Germans lost 1–0. He then played in a 2–1 win over Sweden. However, Germany finished last in their group after a 2–0 loss against South Korea, and were knocked out from the group stage of the World Cup.

Draxler was not included in Germany's 26-man squad for Euro 2020.

== Style of play ==
Draxler is two-footed and known for his speed and intensity in one-on-one situations. He is mainly deployed as a left winger but he can also be deployed as a right winger and as an attacking midfielder. In his Schalke 04 youth career, Draxler was deployed mainly as an attacking midfielder where he always felt most at home.

Draxler challenged by Estonia's Sander Puri during a Euro 2020 qualifier in June 2019.

In January 2014, Draxler was named by The Observer as one of the ten most promising young players in Europe.

FIFA's official website describes Draxler as "tall, fast, with a keen eye for goal, and an exceptional talent in one-on-one situations from his regular position as a left-sided attacking midfielder".

== Personal life ==
Draxler was born in Gladbeck, North Rhine-Westphalia. He attended the Heisenberg-Gymnasium in Gladbeck before changing to Gesamtschule Berger Feld in 2011. In his childhood, he would regularly go with his father to watch Schalke 04's home matches and since then has been a fan of the club.

Draxler married longtime girlfriend French-Laotian dancer Sethanie Taing in June 2025. They share two kids together.

== Career statistics ==
=== Club ===
As of match played 8 April 2026

Appearances and goals by club, season and competition
Club	Season	League			National cup (Note: Includes DFB-Pokal, Coupe de France, Taça de Portugal, Amir of Qatar Cup)		League cup (Note: Includes Coupe de la Ligue, Taça da Liga, QSL Cup)		Continental		Other		Total	
Club	Season	Division	Apps	Goals	Apps	Goals	Apps	Goals	Apps	Goals	Apps	Goals	Apps	Goals
Schalke 04	2010–11	Bundesliga	15	1	3	2	—		6 (Note: Appearances in UEFA Champions League)	0	—		24	3
Schalke 04	2011–12	Bundesliga	30	2	2	1	—		13 (Note: Appearances in UEFA Europa League)	2	1 (Note: Appearance in DFL-Supercup)	0	46	5
Schalke 04	2012–13	Bundesliga	30	10	3	2	—		6	1	—		39	13
Schalke 04	2013–14	Bundesliga	26	2	2	0	—		10	4	—		38	6
Schalke 04	2014–15	Bundesliga	15	2	1	0	—		3	0	—		19	2
Schalke 04	2015–16	Bundesliga	3	1	1	0	—		0	0	—		4	1
Schalke 04	Total		119	18	12	5	—		38	7	1	0	170	30
VfL Wolfsburg	2015–16	Bundesliga	21	5	1	0	—		9	3	0	0	31	8
VfL Wolfsburg	2016–17	Bundesliga	13	0	1	0	—		—		—		14	0
VfL Wolfsburg	Total		34	5	2	0	—		9	3	0	0	45	8
Paris Saint-Germain	2016–17	Ligue 1	17	4	5	4	1	1	2	1	—		25	10
Paris Saint-Germain	2017–18	Ligue 1	30	4	6	0	3	1	8	0	0	0	47	5
Paris Saint-Germain	2018–19	Ligue 1	31	3	6	2	2	0	7	0	0	0	46	5
Paris Saint-Germain	2019–20	Ligue 1	11	0	4	0	2	0	5	0	0	0	22	0
Paris Saint-Germain	2020–21	Ligue 1	24	4	5	0	—		5	0	0	0	34	4
Paris Saint-Germain	2021–22	Ligue 1	18	2	1	0	—		4	0	1 (Note: Appearance in Trophée des Champions)	0	24	2
Paris Saint-Germain	Total		131	17	27	6	8	2	31	1	1	0	198	26
Benfica (loan)	2022–23	Primeira Liga	10	1	2	0	3	1	3	0	—		18	2
Al Ahli	2023–24	Qatar Stars League	11	6	0	0	2	1	—		—		13	7
Al Ahli	2024–25	Qatar Stars League	18	12	1	0	4	0	—		1 (Note: Appearance in Qatar Cup)	0	24	12
Al Ahli	2025–26	Qatar Stars League	19	6	1	0	1	1	5 (Note: Appearances in AFC Champions League Two)	0	1	0	27	7
Al Ahli	Total		48	24	2	0	7	2	5	0	2	0	64	26
Career total			342	65	44	12	18	5	86	11	4	0	495	92

=== International ===
As of match played 29 March 2022

Appearances and goals by national team and year
National team	Year	Apps	Goals
Germany
Germany	2012	3	0
Germany	2013	7	1
Germany	2014	5	0
Germany	2015	1	0
Germany	2016	11	2
Germany	2017	13	3
Germany	2018	9	0
Germany	2019	2	0
Germany	2020	4	1
Germany	2022	2	0
Total		58	7

As of match played 7 October 2020. Scores and results list Germany's goal tally first.

List of international goals scored by Julian Draxler
No.	Date	Venue	Opponent	Score	Result	Competition
1	2 June 2013	RFK Memorial Stadium, Washington, D.C., United States	United States	3–4	3–4	Friendly
2	26 June 2016	Stade Pierre-Mauroy, Villeneuve-d'Ascq, France	Slovakia	3–0	3–0	UEFA Euro 2016
3	11 October 2016	HDI Arena, Hanover, Germany	Northern Ireland	1–0	2–0	2018 FIFA World Cup qualification
4	10 June 2017	Stadion Nürnberg, Nuremberg, Germany	San Marino	1–0	7–0	2018 FIFA World Cup qualification
5	19 June 2017	Fisht Olympic Stadium, Sochi, Russia	Australia	2–1	3–2	2017 FIFA Confederations Cup
6	4 September 2017	Mercedes-Benz Arena, Stuttgart, Germany	Norway	2–0	6–0	2018 FIFA World Cup qualification
7	7 October 2020	RheinEnergieStadion, Cologne, Germany	Turkey	1–0	3–3	Friendly

== Honours ==
Schalke 04

- DFB-Pokal: 2010–11
- DFL-Supercup: 2011

Paris Saint-Germain

- Ligue 1: 2017–18, 2018–19, 2019–20, 2021–22
- Coupe de France: 2016–17, 2017–18, 2019–20, 2020–21
- Coupe de la Ligue: 2016–17, 2017–18, 2019–20
- Trophée des Champions: 2017, 2020

Benfica

- Primeira Liga: 2022–23

Al Ahli

- Qatar-UAE Challenge Cup: 2026

Germany

- FIFA World Cup: 2014
- FIFA Confederations Cup: 2017

Individual

- Fritz Walter Medal U18 Gold: 2011
- Sportschau Goal of the Year Award: 2013 (shared with Raúl)
- kicker Bundesliga Team of the Season: 2013–14
- Bundesliga Young Player of the Year: 2013–14
- FIFA Confederations Cup Golden Ball: 2017

Orders

- Silbernes Lorbeerblatt: 2014
