= Moise Kean =

Italian footballer (born 2000)

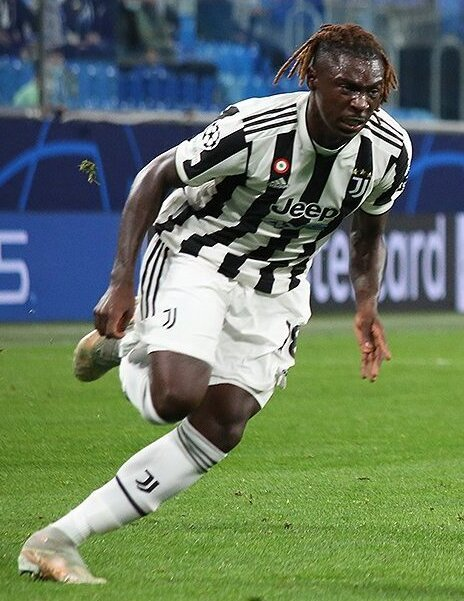
- Kean with Juventus in 2021

Personal information
- Full name: Bioty Moise Kean
- Date of birth: 28 February 2000 (age 26)
- Place of birth: Vercelli, Italy
- Height: 1.83 m (6 ft 0 in)
- Position: Striker

Team information
- Current team: Como (on loan from Fiorentina)
- Number: 90

Youth career
- 2005–2007: Asti
- 2007–2010: Torino
- 2010–2016: Juventus

Senior career*
Years	Team	Apps	(Gls)
2016–2019	Juventus	16	(7)
2017–2018	→ Hellas Verona (loan)	19	(4)
2019–2023	Everton	32	(2)
2020–2021	→ Paris Saint-Germain (loan)	26	(13)
2021–2023	→ Juventus (loan)	55	(10)
2023–2024	Juventus	24	(1)
2024–	Fiorentina	59	(27)
2026–	→ Como (loan)	3	(0)

International career^{‡}
2015	Italy U15	6	(2)
2015	Italy U16	4	(3)
2015–2017	Italy U17	17	(8)
2017–2018	Italy U19	6	(4)
2018	Italy U20	1	(2)
2018–2019	Italy U21	9	(5)
2018–	Italy	28	(13)
Medal record
Men's Football
Representing Italy
UEFA Nations League
Third place	2021 Italy
UEFA European Under-19 Championship
Runner-up	2018 Finland
- * Club domestic league appearances and goals as of 20 September 2026 (UTC) ‡ National team caps and goals as of 2 October 2026 (UTC)

Bioty Moise Kean (pronounced [ˌmɔis ˈkɛn] or [- ˈkin]; born 28 February 2000) is an Italian professional footballer who plays as a striker for Serie A club Como, on loan from Fiorentina, and the Italy national team.

Kean started his professional career with Juventus in 2016, winning a domestic double (league and cup) in his first season with the club. He spent the following season on loan with Hellas Verona before returning to Juventus the next season, winning another Serie A title in 2019. In the summer of that year, Kean joined English side Everton, who loaned him to French club Paris Saint-Germain in 2020, and back to Juventus in 2021, before he rejoined the Turin club permanently in 2023.

At the international level, Kean made his senior debut for Italy in 2018. He is the third-youngest goalscorer for Italy in a competitive match, behind Wilfried Gnonto and Bruno Nicolè.

== Early and personal life ==
Kean was born in Vercelli to Ivorian parents Biorou and Isabelle. When his parents separated when he was four years old, he and his two brothers moved with their mother to Asti, where he spent the rest of his childhood and adolescent years. Kean's older brother, Giovanni, is also a footballer. He grew up a supporter of Inter Milan and idolised Obafemi Martins, their striker at that time.

A fan of hip hop and rap music, Kean collaborated with the group 19F in their song "Outfit"; a year later, Kean released an album, Chosen.

== Club career ==
=== Youth career ===
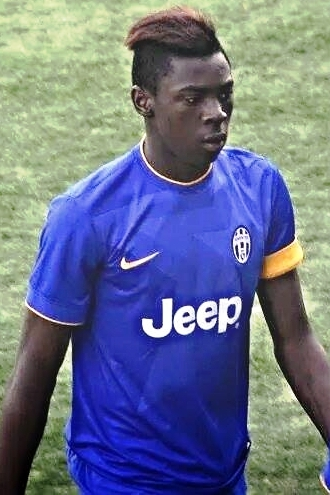
Kean with Juventus' youth team in 2015

Kean was first noticed by Renato Biasi, who included him in the youth teams of Asti before offering him to Torino. In 2010, he was signed by Torino's cross-city rivals Juventus on a free transfer. In the 2015–16 season, Kean scored 24 goals in 25 games for Juventus U19.

=== Juventus ===
==== 2016–17: Debut season ====
Kean made his professional debut for Juventus on 19 November 2016, at the age of 16 years, 265 days, coming on in the 84th minute for Mario Mandžukić in a 3–0 Serie A win over Pescara. Upon doing so, he became the club's youngest-ever debutant and the first player born in the 2000s to play in one of Europe's four major leagues.

On 22 November, he became the first player born in the 2000s to feature in a UEFA Champions League match, after being substituted on in the 84th minute of a 3–1 away win over Sevilla. On 27 May 2017, Juventus' final match of the 2016–17 Serie A season, Kean scored his first goal for Juventus, the winning goal of a 2–1 away victory over Bologna, also becoming the first player born in the 2000s to score a goal in one of Europe's five major leagues.

==== 2017–18: Loan to Verona ====
On 31 August 2017, after extending his contract until 30 June 2020, Kean was loaned to Hellas Verona on a one-year deal. On 10 September, he made his debut for Verona in the Serie A as a substitute, replacing Alex Ferrari in the 46th minute in a 5–0 home defeat against Fiorentina. On 1 October, Kean scored his first goal for Verona in the 87th minute of a 2–2 away draw against Torino.

On 28 January 2018, Kean scored his first Serie A brace in a 4–1 away win against Fiorentina, becoming only the second player born in the 2000s after Pietro Pellegri to have done so. He played 20 games and scored four goals for Verona.

==== 2018–19: Return to Juventus ====
Upon his return from loan, Kean's first goal for Juventus in the 2018–19 season came on 12 January 2019, scoring in a 2–0 away win over Bologna in the Coppa Italia. On 8 March, Kean scored two goals in the first half against Udinese, in an eventual 4–1 home win.

On 2 April 2019, Kean scored the second goal in a 2–0 away win against Cagliari, during which Kean was subject to racist chants from a section of Cagliari fans. Juventus teammate Leonardo Bonucci was heavily criticised after stating that Kean was partly to blame by his celebration which caused further jeers. (Note: Bonucci implied that Kean's celebration caused further jeers, stating to Sky Sport Italia: "Kean knows that when he scores a goal, he has to focus on celebrating with his teammates. He knows he could've done something differently too. There were racist jeers after the goal, Blaise heard it and was angered. I think the blame is 50–50, because Moise shouldn't have done that and the Curva should not have reacted that way. We are professionals, we have to set the example and not provoke anyone.") England international Raheem Sterling deemed Bonucci's comment "laughable", compatriot Mario Balotelli, English rapper Stormzy, and former Juventus player Paul Pogba all also defended Moise.

In Juventus's following match on 6 April, Kean came off the bench against AC Milan to score the winning goal in a 2–1 home win in Serie A, putting his side just one victory away from winning the league title. The following league match, on 13 April, Kean scored the first goal in a 2–1 away defeat against SPAL, marking his sixth-consecutive goal in as many matches for club and country.

=== Everton ===
Kean joined Everton on 4 August 2019, signing a five-year contract for a fee of €27.5 million, plus €2.5 million in add-ons. On 10 August, he made his Everton debut in a 0–0 draw against Crystal Palace in the Premier League, coming on as a substitute for Dominic Calvert-Lewin. In November 2019, Kean was dropped from Everton's match-day squad for disciplinary reasons. He scored his first goal for Everton on 21 January 2020, in a 2–2 home draw against Newcastle United in the Premier League.

For the last game of the season, Kean was handed a start, and scored his second goal for Everton, equalising against Bournemouth in the 41st minute, a game Everton went on to lose.

==== 2020–21: Loan to Paris Saint-Germain ====
Kean began the 2020–21 season at Everton, and scored two goals in two EFL Cup matches.

On 4 October 2020, he joined Ligue 1 club Paris Saint-Germain in a one-year loan. He made his debut in a 4–0 league away win against Nîmes on 16 October; he did not score a goal, but saw a headed attempt ricochet off the crossbar. In the following league game on 24 October, Kean's first goals for the club came in the form of a brace against Dijon, in a 4–0 win. On 28 October, in Paris Saint-Germain's next game, Kean scored his first Champions League goals, scoring a brace against Turkish club İstanbul Başakşehir in the group stage.

On 10 February 2021, Kean made his Coupe de France debut; he scored the only goal of the match in a 1–0 win over Caen to take PSG to the round of 32. Kean's first goal in the Champions League knockout stage came on 16 February, scoring a header in a 4–1 away win at Barcelona in the first leg of the round of 16.

=== Return to Juventus ===
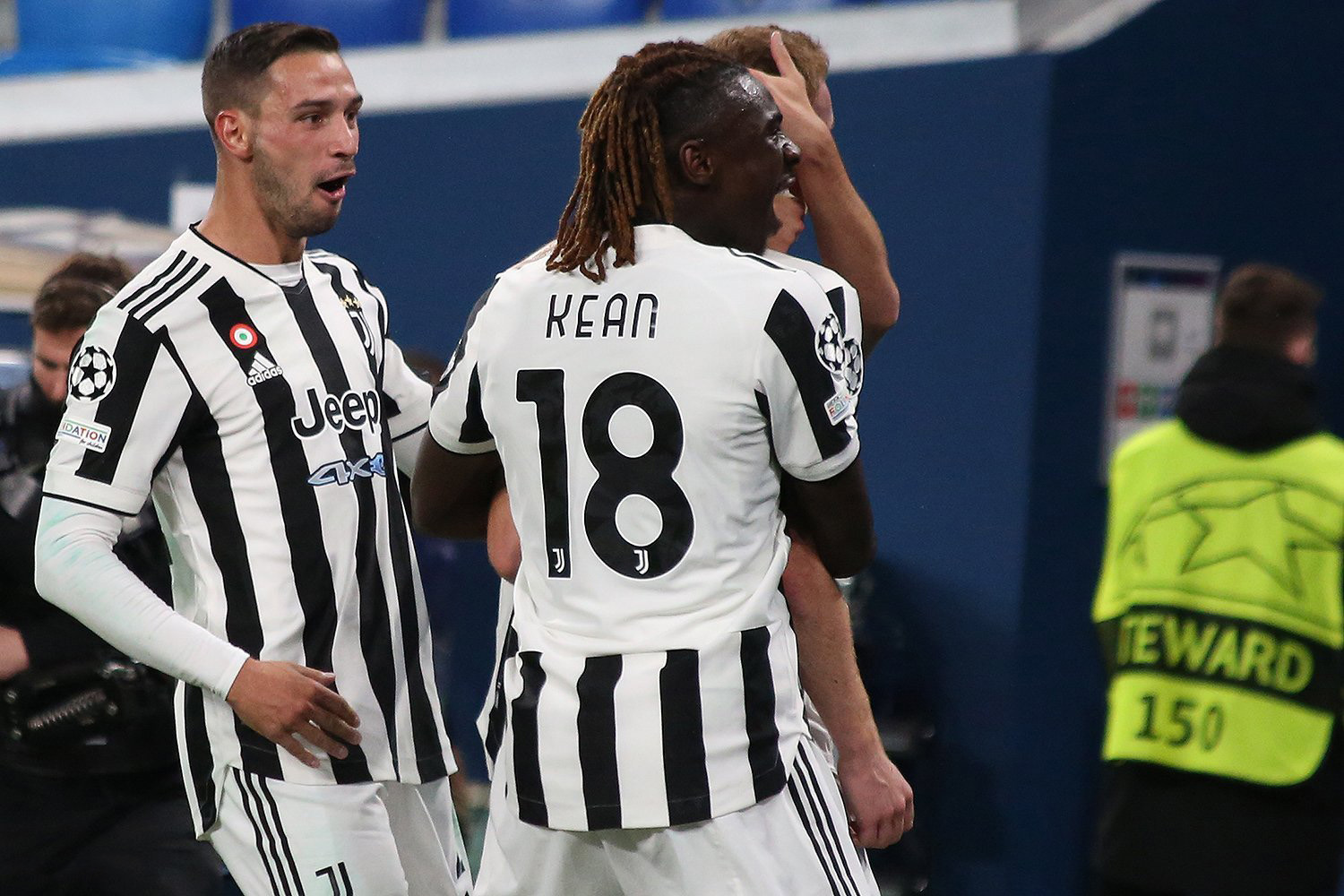
Kean celebrating with his Juventus teammates in 2021

During the 2021–22 season, after his return from his loan, Kean was sent-off in Everton's 2–1 win against Huddersfield.

On 31 August 2021, Kean returned to Juventus on a two-year loan deal for a loan fee of €7 million, with an obligation to buy in summer 2023 for a reported €28 million plus €3 million in add-ons. Kean's debut came on 11 September, as a substitute, in a 2–1 defeat to Napoli; in the 85th minute, Kean made a mistake which helped Napoli's Kalidou Koulibaly score the winning goal. On 22 September, Kean debuted as a starter against Spezia and scored the opening goal, his first since his return. On 8 December, Kean scored the winning goal in a 1–0 win against Malmö, his first in the Champions League with Juventus.

The transfer was made permanent on 8 March 2023. Kean was scheduled to complete a six-month loan deal to Atlético Madrid until the end of the 2023–24 season on 30 January 2024, but the deal collapsed after his medical revealed that his tibia injury would take three weeks to recover from.

=== Fiorentina ===
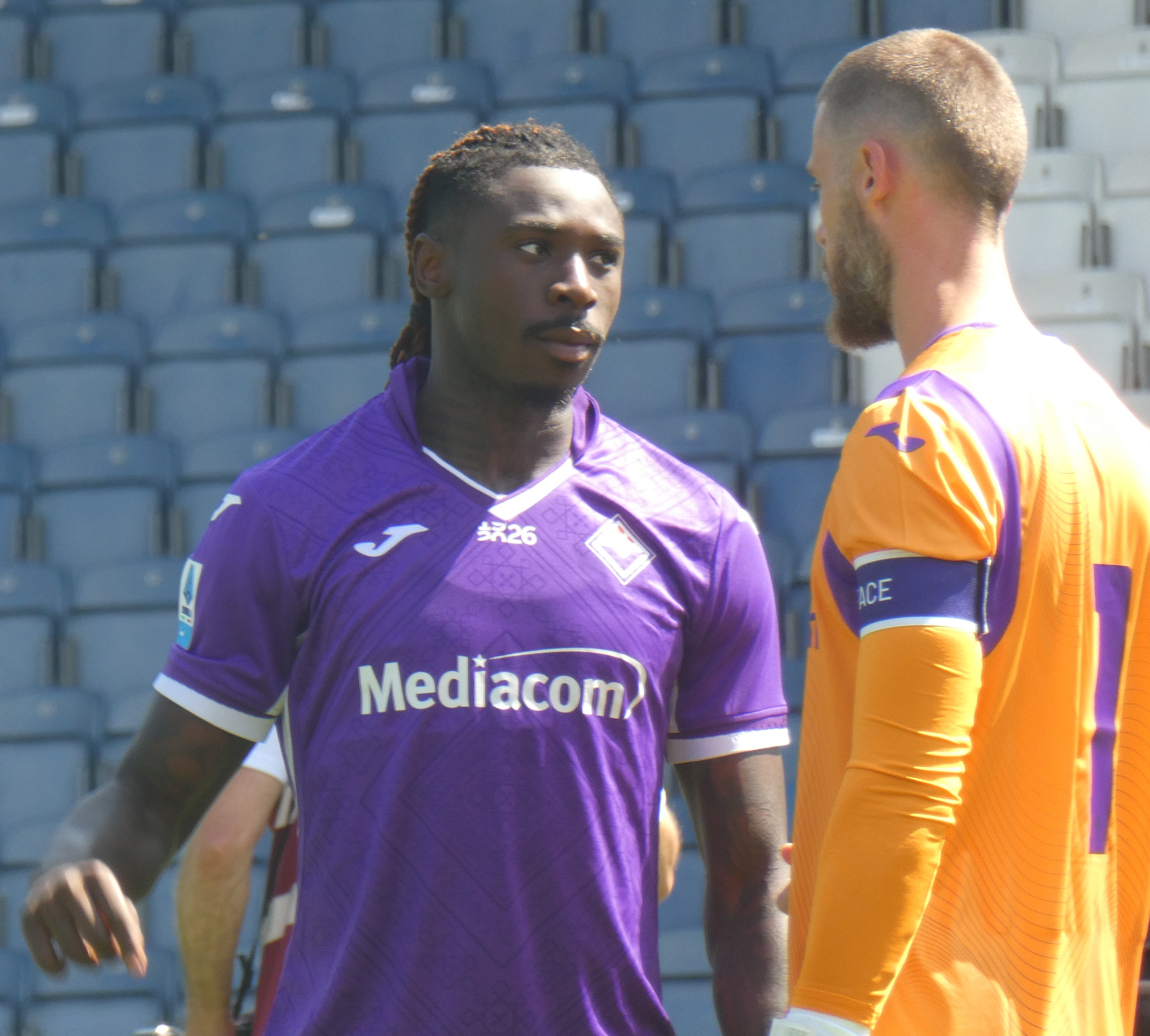
Kean with Fiorentina teammate and captain David de Gea in 2026

On 9 July 2024, Kean joined Serie A club Fiorentina for a reported transfer fee of €13 million that could rise to €18 million with add-ons.

On 23 February 2025, Kean collapsed on the pitch, following a collision with Paweł Dawidowicz and was taken to hospital. He was later discharged following tests. On the final matchday of the 2024–25 season, he scored a goal in a 3–2 victory over Udinese, securing his club's participation in the Conference League. He ended his debut season as his club's leading scorer with 19 goals, finishing second in the Serie A scoring charts behind only Mateo Retegui.

==== 2026–27: Loan to Como ====
On 1 September 2026, Kean joined Como on loan with an obligation to buy, depending on meeting some undisclosed clauses.

== International career ==
Kean was eligible to represent both Italy and the Ivory Coast, being born in Italy to Ivorian parents.

=== Youth ===
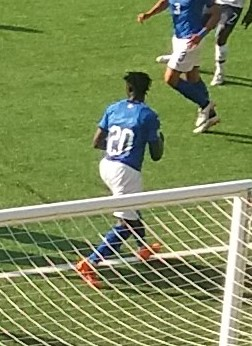
Kean playing for Italy U19 at the 2018 UEFA European Under-19 Championship

Kean represented Italy at under-15 level in 2015. With the Italy U17 team he took part at the 2016 and 2017 editions of the UEFA European Under-17 Championship, scoring a goal in each tournament.

With Italy U19 Kean took part in the 2018 UEFA European Under-19 Championship, scoring in the group stage against Norway, and in the semi-final against France in a 2–0 win to help Italy reach the final. He started the final against Portugal on the bench, and came on as a substitute, scoring two goals in the second half to take the tie to extra time; the match eventually ended in a 4–3 victory for Portugal.

Kean made his debut with the Italy U21 team on 11 October 2018, in a friendly match lost 1–0 against Belgium in Udine. He scored his first goal with the U21 side in the following friendly game, a 2–0 home win against Tunisia on 15 October 2018. He took part in the 2019 UEFA European Under-21 Championship, where Italy were eliminated in the group stage.

=== Senior ===
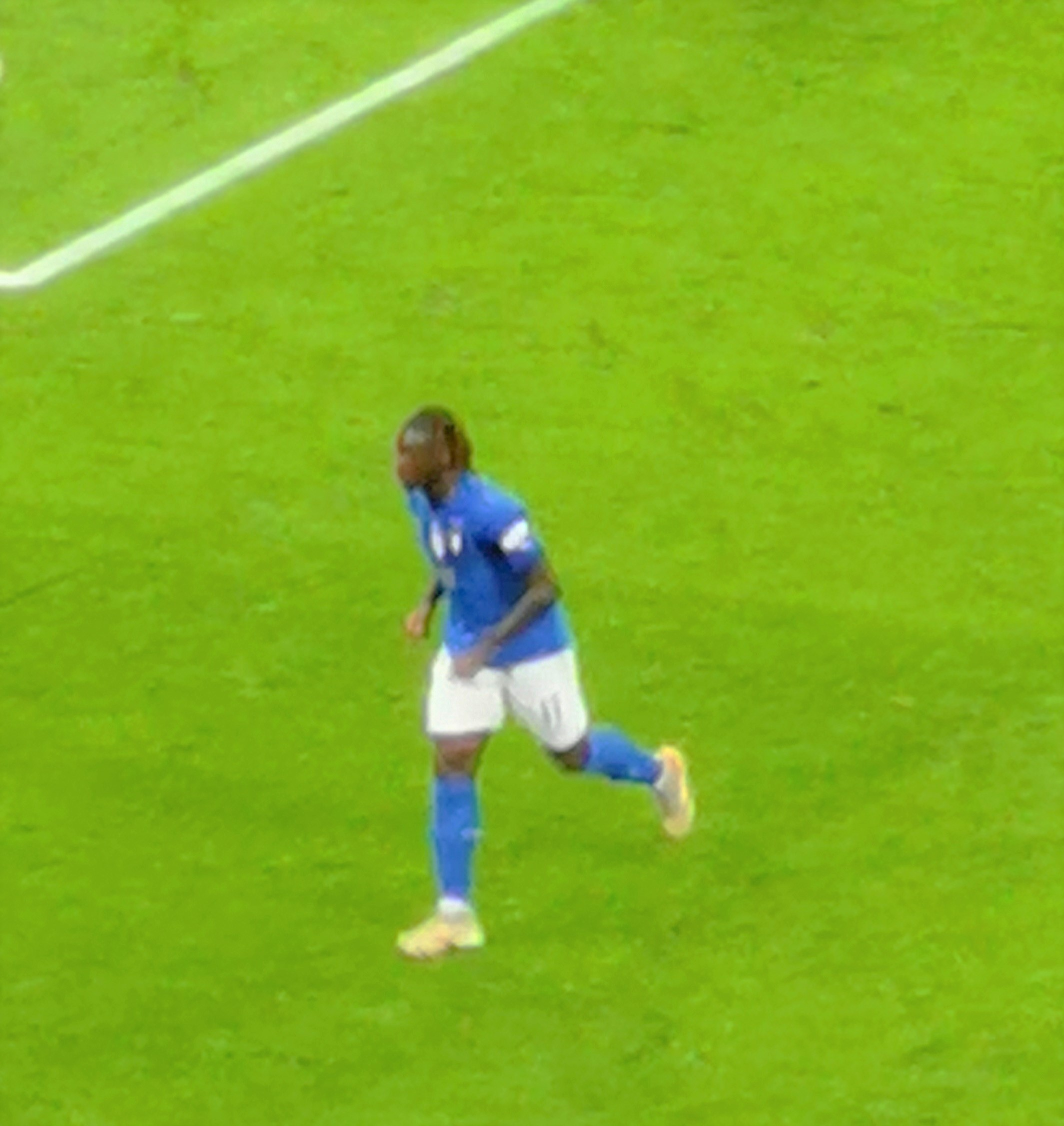
Kean with Italy at the 2021 UEFA Nations League Finals

In November 2018, Kean was called up to the Italy senior side by manager Roberto Mancini. On 20 November, aged 18 years, 265 days, he made his senior debut with Italy in a friendly match against the United States in Belgium, which eventually ended in a 1–0 victory.

On 23 March 2019, Kean made his first start and scored his first goal for Italy in a 2–0 home win over Finland in Italy's opening UEFA Euro 2020 qualifying match. In doing so, he broke several national records: he became the youngest forward to start a match for Italy since Edoardo Mariani started against France in 1912. Kean also became the second-youngest goalscorer for Italy, behind Bruno Nicolè, at the age of 19 years, 23 days, and the youngest player to score a goal for Italy in both a competitive match, and in a European qualifier. Three days later, Kean scored his second international goal in Italy's following Euro 2020 qualifier, a 6–0 home win over Liechtenstein.

On 23 March 2025, he scored a brace in a 3–3 away draw against Germany in the UEFA Nations League quarter-finals, though his side were eliminated with a 5–4 defeat on aggregate.

== Style of play ==
Kean is known to be a quick, tenacious, and physically strong forward, with good technical skills and an accurate shot. Naturally right-footed, his preferred role is in the centre as a main striker, and he has played as a second striker, and a left-sided forward or winger. He is known in particular for great pace, ability in the air, offensive movement, and powerful physique, which enables him either to hold up the ball with his back to goal or take advantage of openings in the opposition's defence; a hard-working player, he has also been praised for his defensive contribution off the ball.

== Career statistics ==
=== Club ===
As of match played 20 September 2026

Appearances and goals by club, season and competition
Club	Season	League			National cup (Note: Includes Coppa Italia, FA Cup, Coupe de France)		League cup (Note: Includes EFL Cup)		Europe		Other		Total	
Club	Season	Division	Apps	Goals	Apps	Goals	Apps	Goals	Apps	Goals	Apps	Goals	Apps	Goals
Juventus	2016–17	Serie A	3	1	0	0	—		1 (Note: Appearance(s) in UEFA Champions League)	0	0	0	4	1
Juventus	2018–19	Serie A	13	6	1	1	—		3	0	0	0	17	7
Juventus	Total		16	7	1	1	—		4	0	0	0	21	8
Hellas Verona (loan)	2017–18	Serie A	19	4	1	0	—		—		—		20	4
Everton	2019–20	Premier League	29	2	1	0	3	0	—		—		33	2
Everton	2020–21	Premier League	2	0	—		2	2	—		—		4	2
Everton	2021–22	Premier League	1	0	—		1	0	—		—		2	0
Everton	Total		32	2	1	0	6	2	—		—		39	4
Paris Saint-Germain (loan)	2020–21	Ligue 1	26	13	5	1	—		9	3	1 (Note: Appearance in Trophée des Champions)	0	41	17
Juventus	2021–22 (Note: On loan from Everton)	Serie A	32	5	3	0	—		6	1	1 (Note: Appearance in Supercoppa Italiana)	0	42	6
Juventus	2022–23 (Note: Part of season spent on loan from Everton)	Serie A	28	6	2	1	—		10 (Note: Five appearances and one goal in UEFA Champions League, five appearances in UEFA Europa League)	1	—		40	8
Juventus	2023–24	Serie A	19	0	1	0	—		—		—		20	0
Juventus	Total		79	11	6	1	—		16	2	1	0	102	14
Fiorentina	2024–25	Serie A	32	19	1	1	—		11 (Note: Appearances in UEFA Conference League)	5	—		44	25
Fiorentina	2025–26	Serie A	26	8	0	0	—		7	1	—		33	9
Fiorentina	2026–27	Serie A	1	0	1	1	—		—		—		2	1
Fiorentina	Total		59	27	2	2	—		18	6	—		79	35
Como (loan)	2026–27	Serie A	3	0	0	0	—		1	0	—		4	0
Career total			234	64	16	5	6	2	48	11	2	0	306	82

=== International ===
As of match played 2 October 2026

Appearances and goals by national team and year
National team	Year	Apps	Goals
Italy	2018	1	0
Italy	2019	2	2
Italy	2020	5	0
Italy	2021	4	2
Italy	2022	0	0
Italy	2023	3	0
Italy	2024	4	1
Italy	2025	5	6
Italy	2026	4	2
Total		28	13

Italy score listed first, score column indicates score after each Kean goal.

List of international goals scored by Moise Kean
No.	Date	Venue	Cap	Opponent	Score	Result	Competition	Ref.
1	23 March 2019	Stadio Friuli, Udine, Italy	2	Finland	2–0	2–0	UEFA Euro 2020 qualifying	
2	26 March 2019	Stadio Ennio Tardini, Parma, Italy	3	Liechtenstein	5–0	6–0	UEFA Euro 2020 qualifying	
3	8 September 2021	Mapei Stadium – Città del Tricolore, Reggio Emilia, Italy	10	Lithuania	1–0	5–0	2022 FIFA World Cup qualification	
4	8 September 2021	Mapei Stadium – Città del Tricolore, Reggio Emilia, Italy	10	Lithuania	4–0	5–0	2022 FIFA World Cup qualification	
5	9 September 2024	Bozsik Aréna, Budapest, Hungary	17	Israel	2–0	2–1	2024–25 UEFA Nations League A	
6	23 March 2025	Westfalenstadion, Dortmund, Germany	21	Germany	1–3	3–3	2024–25 UEFA Nations League A	
7	23 March 2025	Westfalenstadion, Dortmund, Germany	21	Germany	2–3	3–3	2024–25 UEFA Nations League A	
8	5 September 2025	Stadio di Bergamo, Bergamo, Italy	22	Estonia	1–0	5–0	2026 FIFA World Cup qualification	
9	8 September 2025	Nagyerdei Stadion, Debrecen, Hungary	23	Israel	1–1	5–4	2026 FIFA World Cup qualification	
10	8 September 2025	Nagyerdei Stadion, Debrecen, Hungary	23	Israel	2–2	5–4	2026 FIFA World Cup qualification	
11	11 October 2025	A. Le Coq Arena, Tallinn, Estonia	24	Estonia	1–0	3–1	2026 FIFA World Cup qualification	
12	26 March 2026	Stadio di Bergamo, Bergamo, Italy	25	Northern Ireland	2–0	2–0	2026 FIFA World Cup qualification – UEFA second round	
13	31 March 2026	Stadion Bilino Polje, Zenica, Bosnia and Herzegovina	26	Bosnia and Herzegovina	1–0	1–1 (a.e.t.) (1–4 p)	2026 FIFA World Cup qualification – UEFA second round	

== Honours ==
Juventus

- Serie A: 2016–17, 2018–19
- Coppa Italia: 2016–17, 2023–24
- Supercoppa Italiana: 2018

Paris Saint-Germain

- Coupe de France: 2020–21
- Trophée des Champions: 2020

Italy U19

- UEFA European Under-19 Championship runner-up: 2018

Italy

- UEFA Nations League third place: 2020–21

Individual

- Serie A Player of the Month: November 2022, November 2024
- Serie A Goal of the Month: February 2025
- Serie A Team of the Season: 2024–25
- The Athletic Serie A Team of the Season: 2024–25
- The Athletic Serie A Player of the Season: 2024–25
- Serie A Team of the Year: 2024–25
