= 2020 Trophée des Champions =

French football tournament

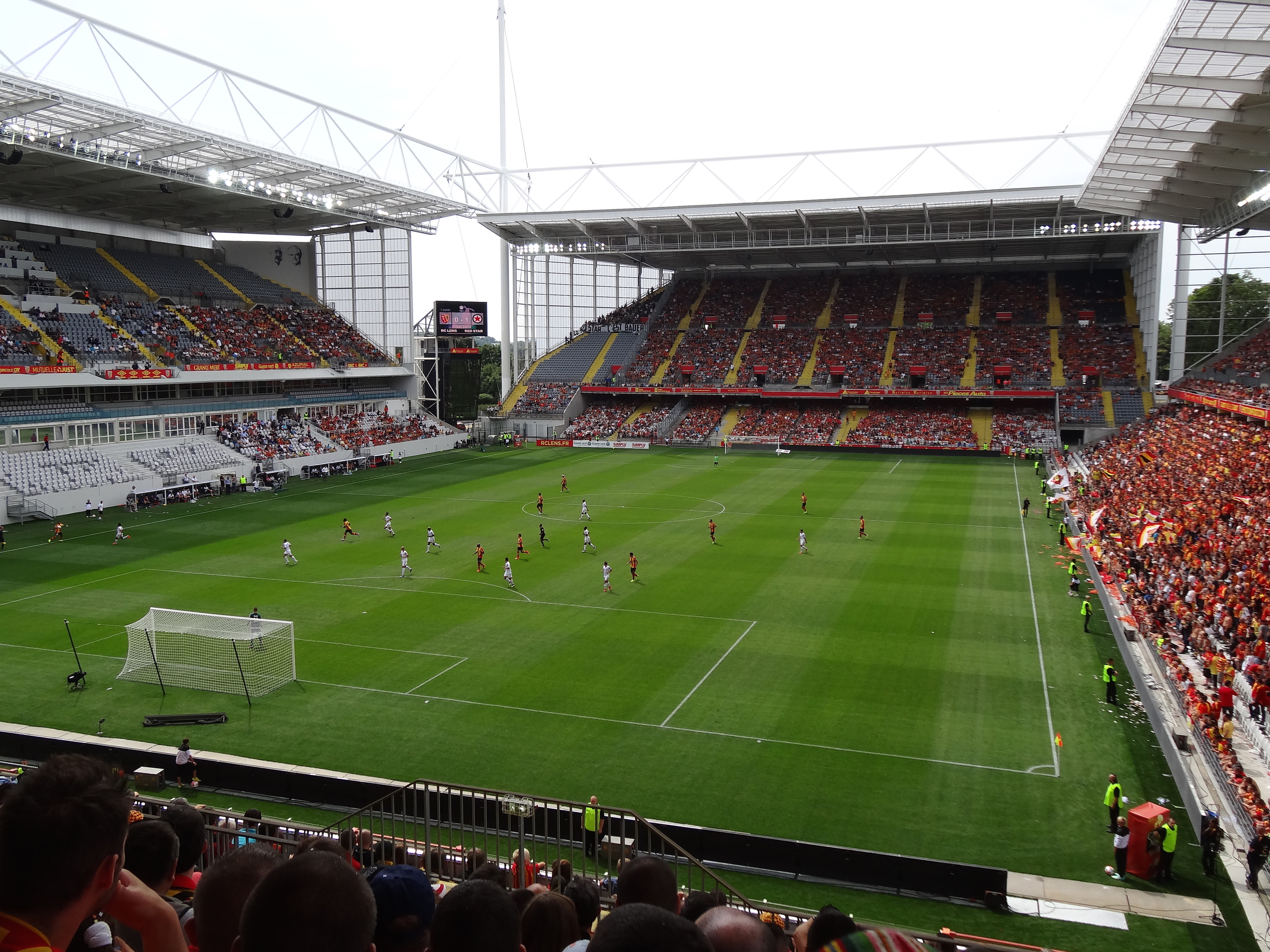
- The Stade Bollaert-Delelis, in Lens, hosted the match.
- Event: Trophée des Champions
Paris Saint-Germain	Marseille
2	1
- Date: 13 January 2021
- Venue: Stade Bollaert-Delelis, Lens, France
- Man of the Match: Mauro Icardi (Paris Saint-Germain)
- Referee: Ruddy Buquet
- Attendance: 0 (Note: The match was played behind closed doors due to the COVID-19 pandemic in France.)

The 2020 Trophée des Champions (transl. 2020 Champions Trophy) was the 25th edition of the French super cup. The match was contested by the 2019–20 Ligue 1 champions and 2019–20 Coupe de France winners Paris Saint-Germain, and the Ligue 1 runners-up Marseille.

The match marked the 99th time Classique rivals Paris Saint-Germain and Marseille played against each other and the second time in the Trophée des Champions, after their first meeting in 2010.

Paris Saint-Germain were the seven-time defending champions. They won the match 2–1 for their tenth Trophée des Champions title.

The match was televised live on the new French joint venture TF1-Mediapro's football channel Téléfoot and other international broadcasters throughout several countries as the part of the four-year LFP broadcasting rights package contracts.

== Host selection ==
In February 2020, the LFP evokes three venues for hosting the 2020 Champions Trophy to take place originally on 1 August 2020, such as: both venues at the outside France (Abidjan in Côte d'Ivoire and Minneapolis in USA) and Bordeaux in France.

For the first time since 2008, a French Super Cup match was held in France.

=== Impact of COVID-19 pandemic ===
The decision for host venue was originally to be taken in the spring but the three cities were not chosen due to the COVID-19 pandemic and the match was postponed to January 2021.

== Match ==
=== Summary ===
Mauro Icardi opened the scoring in the 39th minute when his header from a cross from the right was initially saved and pushed onto the post by goalkeeper Steve Mandanda, he followed up to tap in the rebound from a yard out. Neymar made it 2–0 in the 85th minute with a penalty, sending the goalkeeper the wrong way to shoot into the right corner of the net after Mauro Icardi had been brought down by Yohann Pelé. Dimitri Payet got a goal back for Marseille in the 89th minute when he finished to the left corner of the net from six yards out after a low cross from the right.

=== Details ===
13 January 2021
21:00 CET

Paris Saint-Germain	2–1	Marseille
Icardi 39'; Neymar 85' (pen.)	Report	Payet 89'

Stade Bollaert-Delelis, Lens
Attendance: 0
Referee: Ruddy Buquet

Paris Saint-Germain	Marseille

GK	1	(Costa Rica) Keylor Navas
RB	24	(Italy) Alessandro Florenzi
CB	5	(Brazil) Marquinhos (c)
CB	22	(France) Abdou Diallo
LB	20	(France) Layvin Kurzawa		(substituted off) 65'
CM	21	(Spain) Ander Herrera		(substituted off) 90'
CM	8	(Argentina) Leandro Paredes		(substituted off) 88'
RW	11	(Argentina) Ángel Di María		(substituted off) 65'
AM	6	(Italy) Marco Verratti
LW	7	(France) Kylian Mbappé	(yellow card) 90+4'
CF	9	(Argentina) Mauro Icardi		(substituted off) 88'
Substitutes:
GK	16	(Spain) Sergio Rico
DF	3	(France) Presnel Kimpembe		(substituted on) 65'
DF	25	(Netherlands) Mitchel Bakker
DF	32	(France) Timothée Pembélé
MF	15	(Portugal) Danilo Pereira		(substituted on) 88'
MF	19	(Spain) Pablo Sarabia		(substituted on) 90'
MF	23	(Germany) Julian Draxler
FW	10	(Brazil) Neymar		(substituted on) 65'
FW	18	(Italy) Moise Kean		(substituted on) 88'
Manager:
(Argentina) Mauricio Pochettino

GK	30	(France) Steve Mandanda (c)		(substituted off) 46'
RB	2	(Japan) Hiroki Sakai
CB	3	(Spain) Álvaro	(yellow card) 77'
CB	15	(Croatia) Duje Ćaleta-Car
LB	25	(Japan) Yuto Nagatomo	(yellow card) 26'	(substituted off) 66'
DM	4	(France) Boubacar Kamara
CM	21	(France) Valentin Rongier		(substituted off) 80'
CM	22	(France) Pape Gueye		(substituted off) 56'
RW	26	(France) Florian Thauvin
CF	10	(France) Dimitri Payet
LW	7	(Serbia) Nemanja Radonjić	(yellow card) 17'	(substituted off) 56'
Substitutes:
GK	16	(France) Yohann Pelé		(substituted on) 46'
DF	5	(Argentina) Leonardo Balerdi
DF	29	(Spain) Pol Lirola	(yellow card) 72'	(substituted on) 66'
MF	8	(France) Morgan Sanson		(substituted on) 56'
MF	17	(France) Michaël Cuisance
MF	24	(Tunisia) Saîf-Eddine Khaoui
FW	9	(Argentina) Darío Benedetto		(substituted on) 56'
FW	23	(France) Marley Aké
FW	28	(France) Valère Germain		(substituted on) 80'
Manager:
(Portugal) André Villas-Boas

Man of the Match:
Mauro Icardi (Paris Saint-Germain)

Assistant referees:
Guillaume Debart
Benjamin Pages
Fourth official:
Mikaël Lesage
Video assistant referee:
Willy Delajod
Assistant video assistant referee:
Alexandre Castro

Match rules

- 90 minutes.
- Penalty shoot-out if scores level.
- Nine named substitutes, of which up to five may be used. (Note: Each team was given only three opportunities to make substitutions, excluding substitutions made at half-time.)

== See also ==
- 2020–21 Ligue 1
- 2020–21 Coupe de France
- 2020–21 Olympique de Marseille season
- 2020–21 Paris Saint-Germain FC season
