= 2020–21 Paris Saint-Germain FC season =

51st season in existence of Paris Saint-Germain

Paris Saint-Germain
2020–21 season
- President: Nasser Al-Khelaifi
- Head coach: Thomas Tuchel (until 29 December); Mauricio Pochettino (from 2 January)
- Stadium: Parc des Princes
- Ligue 1: 2nd
- Coupe de France: Winners
- Trophée des Champions: Winners
- UEFA Champions League: Semi-finals
- Top goalscorer: League: Kylian Mbappé (27); All: Kylian Mbappé (42)
- Highest home attendance: 5,000 vs Marseille (13 September 2020)
- Lowest home attendance: 3,352 vs Metz (16 September 2020)
- Biggest win: 6–1 vs Angers; 5–0 vs Angers
- Biggest defeat: 0–2 vs Monaco; 0–2 vs Manchester City
| Home colours | Away colours | Third colours |

The 2020–21 season was Paris Saint-Germain F.C.'s 48th professional season and the club's 47th consecutive season in the top flight of French football. It was the club's 51st season in existence. In addition to the domestic league, Paris Saint-Germain participated in this season's editions of the Coupe de France, the Trophée des Champions, and the UEFA Champions League. Following the indefinite suspension of the Coupe de la Ligue, PSG did not compete in the tournament for the first time since 1995. The season covered the period from 24 August 2020 to 30 June 2021.

The season was the first since 2012–13 without Edinson Cavani, who joined Manchester United, and the first since 2011–12 without Thiago Silva, who departed to Chelsea.

== Kits ==
| Home | Home alt. | Away | Away alt. | Away alt. 2 | Third | Fourth |
| Goalkeeper 1 | Goalkeeper 2 |

== Players ==
Note: Flags indicate national team as defined under FIFA eligibility rules; some limited exceptions apply. Players may hold more than one non-FIFA nationality.

| No. | Pos. | Nation | Player |
|---|---|---|---|
| 1 | GK | CRC | Keylor Navas |
| 3 | DF | FRA | Presnel Kimpembe (vice-captain) |
| 4 | DF | GER | Thilo Kehrer |
| 5 | DF | BRA | Marquinhos (captain) |
| 6 | MF | ITA | Marco Verratti |
| 7 | FW | FRA | Kylian Mbappé |
| 8 | MF | ARG | Leandro Paredes |
| 9 | FW | ARG | Mauro Icardi |
| 10 | FW | BRA | Neymar |
| 11 | MF | ARG | Ángel Di María |
| 12 | MF | BRA | Rafinha |
| 14 | DF | ESP | Juan Bernat |

| No. | Pos. | Nation | Player |
|---|---|---|---|
| 15 | MF | POR | Danilo Pereira |
| 16 | GK | ESP | Sergio Rico |
| 18 | FW | ITA | Moise Kean (on loan from Everton) |
| 19 | MF | ESP | Pablo Sarabia |
| 20 | DF | FRA | Layvin Kurzawa |
| 21 | MF | ESP | Ander Herrera |
| 22 | DF | SEN | Abdou Diallo |
| 23 | MF | GER | Julian Draxler |
| 24 | DF | ITA | Alessandro Florenzi (on loan from Roma) |
| 25 | DF | NED | Mitchel Bakker |
| 27 | MF | SEN | Idrissa Gueye |
| 30 | GK | FRA | Alexandre Letellier |
| 31 | DF | FRA | Colin Dagba |

== Transfers ==
=== In ===
| No. | Pos. | Player | Transferred from | Fee | Date | Source |
|---|---|---|---|---|---|---|
| 9 | FW | (Argentina) Mauro Icardi | (Italy) Inter Milan | €50m (Note: Up to €7m in add-ons) | 1 July 2020 (Note: Transfer officially completed during the 2019–20 season as the 2019–20 UEFA Champions League knockout phase was delayed due to the COVID-19 pandemic) | |
| 16 | GK | (Spain) Sergio Rico | (Spain) Sevilla | €6m | 5 September 2020 | |
| 24 | DF | (Italy) Alessandro Florenzi | (Italy) Roma | Loan (Note: €1m loan fee with an option to sign permanently for €9m.) | 11 September 2020 | |
| 30 | GK | (France) Alexandre Letellier | Unattached | Free | 25 September 2020 | |
| 18 | FW | (Italy) Moise Kean | (England) Everton | Loan | 4 October 2020 | |
| 15 | MF | (Portugal) Danilo Pereira | (Portugal) Porto | Loan (Note: €4m loan fee with an option to sign permanently for €16m. The buy option in his deal was exercised on 23 May 2021.) | 5 October 2020 | |
| 12 | MF | (Brazil) Rafinha | (Spain) Barcelona | Free (Note: Up to €3m in add-ons) | 5 October 2020 | |

=== Out ===
| Pos. | Player | Transferred to | Fee | Date | Source |
|---|---|---|---|---|---|
| DF | (France) Moussa Sissako | (Belgium) Standard Liège | €400k | 11 June 2020 | |
| DF | (Belgium) Thomas Meunier | (Germany) Borussia Dortmund | Free | 1 July 2020 | |
| DF | (France) Tanguy Nianzou | (Germany) Bayern Munich | Free | 1 July 2020 | |
| MF | (France) Adil Aouchiche | Released (Note: On 20 July 2020, Aouchiche signed for Saint-Étienne.) | Free | 1 July 2020 | |
| FW | (Uruguay) Edinson Cavani | Released (Note: On 5 October 2020, Cavani signed for Manchester United.) | Free | 1 July 2020 | |
| MF | (France) Éric Junior Dina Ebimbe | (France) Dijon (Note: Includes an option to sign permanently.) | Loan | 6 July 2020 | |
| FW | (Cameroon) Eric Maxim Choupo-Moting | Released (Note: On 5 October 2020, Choupo-Moting signed for Bayern Munich.) | Free | 24 August 2020 | |
| GK | (Spain) Sergio Rico | (Spain) Sevilla | Loan return | 24 August 2020 | |
| DF | (Brazil) Thiago Silva | Released (Note: On 28 August 2020, Silva signed for Chelsea.) | Free | 24 August 2020 | |
| DF | (France) Loïc Mbe Soh | (England) Nottingham Forest | €5m | 11 September 2020 | |
| GK | (France) Alphonse Areola | (England) Fulham | Loan | 9 September 2020 | |
| GK | (Poland) Marcin Bułka | (Spain) Cartagena | Loan | 28 September 2020 | |
| GK | (France) Garissone Innocent | (France) Caen | Loan | 2 October 2020 | |
| FW | (France) Arnaud Kalimuendo | (France) Lens | Loan | 5 October 2020 | |
| FW | (Spain) Jesé | Released | Free | 5 December 2020 | |
| GK | (Poland) Marcin Bułka | (France) Châteauroux | Loan | 31 January 2021 | |
| MF | (France) Bandiougou Fadiga | (France) Brest | Loan | 1 February 2021 | |

== Competitions ==
=== Overall record ===
| Competition | First match | Last match | Starting round | Final position | Record | | | | | | | |
| Competition | First match | Last match | Starting round | Final position | Pld | W | D | L | GF | GA | GD | Win % |
|---|---|---|---|---|---|---|---|---|---|---|---|---|
| Ligue 1 | 10 September 2020 | 23 May 2021 | Matchday 1 | 2nd | 38 | 26 | 4 | 8 | 86 | 28 | +58 | 68.42 |
| Coupe de France | 10 February 2021 | 19 May 2021 | Round of 64 | Winners | 6 | 5 | 1 | 0 | 16 | 2 | +14 | 83.33 |
| Trophée des Champions | 13 January 2021 | | Final | Winners | 1 | 1 | 0 | 0 | 2 | 1 | +1 | 100.00 |
| UEFA Champions League | 20 October 2020 | 4 May 2021 | Group stage | Semi-finals | 12 | 6 | 1 | 5 | 22 | 15 | +7 | 50.00 |
| Total | | | | | 57 | 38 | 6 | 13 | 126 | 46 | +80 | 66.67 |

Source: Soccerway

=== Ligue 1 ===
==== League table ====
| Pos | Team | Pld | W | D | L | GF | GA | GD | Pts | Qualification or relegation |
|---|---|---|---|---|---|---|---|---|---|---|
| 1 | Lille (C) | 38 | 24 | 11 | 3 | 64 | 23 | +41 | 83 | Qualification for the Champions League group stage |
| 2 | Paris Saint-Germain | 38 | 26 | 4 | 8 | 86 | 28 | +58 | 82 | Qualification for the Champions League group stage |
| 3 | Monaco | 38 | 24 | 6 | 8 | 76 | 42 | +34 | 78 | Qualification for the Champions League third qualifying round |
| 4 | Lyon | 38 | 22 | 10 | 6 | 81 | 43 | +38 | 76 | Qualification for the Europa League group stage (Note: Since the winners of the 2020–21 Coupe de France, Paris Saint-Germain, qualified for European competition based on league position, the Europa League group stage spot reserved for the cup winners was passed to the fifth-placed team, and the Europa Conference League play-off round spot was passed to the sixth-placed team.) |
| 5 | Marseille | 38 | 16 | 12 | 10 | 54 | 47 | +7 | 60 | Qualification for the Europa League group stage |

Source: Ligue 1
Rules for classification: 1) Points; 2) Goal difference; 3) Goals scored; 4) Head-to-head goal difference; 5) Fairplay ranking.
(C) Champions

==== Results summary ====
| Overall | | | | | | | | Home | | | | | | Away | | | | | |
| Pld | W | D | L | GF | GA | GD | Pts | W | D | L | GF | GA | GD | W | D | L | GF | GA | GD |
|---|---|---|---|---|---|---|---|---|---|---|---|---|---|---|---|---|---|---|---|
| 38 | 26 | 4 | 8 | 86 | 28 | +58 | 82 | 13 | 1 | 5 | 44 | 14 | +30 | 13 | 3 | 3 | 42 | 14 | +28 |

Source: Ligue 1

==== Results by round ====
| Round | 1 | 2 | 3 | 4 | 5 | 6 | 7 | 8 | 9 | 10 | 11 | 12 | 13 | 14 | 15 | 16 | 17 | 18 | 19 | 20 | 21 | 22 | 23 | 24 | 25 | 26 | 27 | 28 | 29 | 30 | 31 | 32 | 33 | 34 | 35 | 36 | 37 | 38 |
|---|---|---|---|---|---|---|---|---|---|---|---|---|---|---|---|---|---|---|---|---|---|---|---|---|---|---|---|---|---|---|---|---|---|---|---|---|---|---|
| Ground | H | A | H | A | A | H | A | H | A | H | A | H | A | H | H | A | H | A | H | A | H | A | H | A | H | H | A | A | H | A | H | A | H | A | H | A | H | A |
| Result | W | L | L | W | W | W | W | W | W | W | L | D | W | L | W | D | W | D | W | W | W | L | W | W | W | L | W | W | L | W | L | W | W | W | W | D | W | W |
| Position | 16 | 16 | 15 | 8 | 7 | 4 | 2 | 1 | 1 | 1 | 1 | 1 | 1 | 3 | 2 | 3 | 3 | 2 | 2 | 1 | 1 | 3 | 3 | 3 | 2 | 3 | 2 | 2 | 2 | 1 | 2 | 2 | 2 | 2 | 2 | 2 | 2 | 2 |

Source: Ligue 1
A = Away; H = Home; W = Win; D = Draw; L = Loss

==== Matches ====
The league fixtures were announced on 9 July 2020.

| 10 September 2020 2 | Lens | 1–0 | Paris Saint-Germain | Lens |
| 21:00 CEST (UTC+2) | Doucouré (yellow card) 44'; Ganago 57'; Sotoca (yellow card) 70' | Report | Sarabia (yellow card) 38'; Bernat (yellow card) 78' | Stadium: Stade Bollaert-Delelis; Attendance: 5,067; Referee: Hakim Ben El Hadj |
Note: Match originally scheduled for 30 August 2020, but postponed due the delayed conclusion of the knockout phase of the previous season's UEFA Champions League.

| 13 September 2020 3 | Paris Saint-Germain | 0–1 | Marseille | Paris |
| 21:00 CEST (UTC+2) | Neymar (yellow card) 11', (red card) 90+7'; Florenzi (yellow card) 13'; Bernat (yellow card) 52'; Paredes (yellow card) 72' (yellow-red card) 90+8'; Di María (yellow card) 74'; Kurzawa (red card) 90+7' | Report | Sakai (yellow card) 7'; Payet (yellow card) 11'; Thauvin 31'; Gueye (yellow card) 38'; Álvaro (yellow card) 50'; Lopez (yellow card) 61'; Benedetto (yellow card) 71' (yellow-red card) 90+8'; Strootman (yellow card) 90+1'; Amavi (red card) 90+7' | Stadium: Parc des Princes; Attendance: 3,904; Referee: Jérôme Brisard |

| 16 September 2020 1 | Paris Saint-Germain | 1–0 | Metz | Paris |
| 21:00 CEST (UTC+2) | Diallo (yellow card) 1' (yellow-red card) 65'; Draxler (yellow card) 56', (goal) 90+3' | Report | Maïga (yellow card) 46'; Centonze (yellow card) 61' | Stadium: Parc des Princes; Attendance: 3,352; Referee: Mikael Lesage |
Note: Match originally scheduled for 23 August 2020, but postponed due to Paris Saint-Germain's participation in the knockout phase of the previous season's UEFA Champions League.

| 20 September 2020 4 | Nice | 0–3 | Paris Saint-Germain | Nice |
| 13:00 CEST (UTC+2) | Schneiderlin (yellow card) 88' | Report | Mbappé 38' (pen.); Verratti (yellow card) 43'; Di María 45+1'; Marquinhos 66'; Bakker (yellow card) 82' | Stadium: Allianz Riviera; Attendance: 0 Referee: Benoît Bastien |

| 27 September 2020 5 | Reims | 0–2 | Paris Saint-Germain | Reims |
| 21:00 CEST (UTC+2) | Cassamá (yellow card) 35'; Foket (yellow card) 74' | Report | Icardi 9', 63'; Draxler (yellow card) 52'; Marquinhos (yellow card) 90+2' | Stadium: Stade Auguste-Delaune; Attendance: 4,988; Referee: Ruddy Buquet |

| 2 October 2020 6 | Paris Saint-Germain | 6–1 | Angers | Paris |
| 21:00 CEST (UTC+2) | Florenzi 7'; Kimpembe (yellow card) 33'; Neymar 36', 48'; Draxler 57'; Gueye 71'; Mbappé 84' | Report | Bahoken (yellow card) 30'; Traoré 52'; Cabot (yellow card) 73' | Stadium: Parc des Princes; Attendance: 995; Referee: Frank Schneider |

| 16 October 2020 7 | Nîmes | 0–4 | Paris Saint-Germain | Nîmes |
| 21:00 CEST (UTC+2) | Deaux (yellow card) 6'; Landre (red card) 12' | Report | Rafinha (yellow card) 18'; Gueye (yellow card) 20'; Mbappé 32', 83'; Florenzi 78'; Sarabia 88' | Stadium: Stade des Costières; Attendance: 3,526; Referee: Clément Turpin |

| 24 October 2020 8 | Paris Saint-Germain | 4–0 | Dijon | Paris |
| 21:00 CEST (UTC+2) | Kean 3', 23'; Mbappé 82', 88' | Report | Konaté (yellow card) 45+1'; Panzo (yellow card) 69' | Stadium: Parc des Princes; Attendance: 0 Referee: Johan Hamel |

| 31 October 2020 9 | Nantes | 0–3 | Paris Saint-Germain | Nantes |
| 21:00 CET (UTC+1) | Blas (yellow card) 32'; Coco (yellow card) 67'; Bamba (penalty missed) 70' | Report | Herrera 46'; Mbappé 65' (pen.); Dagba (yellow card) 80'; Sarabia 89' | Stadium: Stade de la Beaujoire; Attendance: 0 Referee: Hakim Ben El Hadj |

| 7 November 2020 10 | Paris Saint-Germain | 3–0 | Rennes | Paris |
| 21:00 CET (UTC+1) | Herrera (yellow card) 4'; Kean 11'; Di María 21', 73'; Dagba (yellow card) 49'; Kurzawa (yellow card) 86' | Report | | Stadium: Parc des Princes; Attendance: 0 Referee: Benoît Bastien |

| 20 November 2020 11 | Monaco | 3–2 | Paris Saint-Germain | Monaco |
| 21:00 CET (UTC+1) | Fofana (yellow card) 36'; Volland 52', 66'; Fàbregas 84' (pen.), (yellow card) 87' | Report | Pereira (yellow card) 20'; Mbappé 25', 37' (pen.); Ruiz-Atil (yellow card) 80'; Diallo (red card) 84'; Kimpembe (yellow card) 88' | Stadium: Stade Louis II; Attendance: 0 Referee: Clément Turpin |

| 28 November 2020 12 | Paris Saint-Germain | 2–2 | Bordeaux | Paris |
| 21:00 CET (UTC+1) | Neymar 27' (pen.); Kean 28'; Pembele (yellow card) 90+2' | Report | Pembele 10' (o.g.); Otávio (yellow card) 26'; Adli 60' | Stadium: Parc des Princes; Attendance: 0 Referee: Jérémie Pignard |

| 5 December 2020 13 | Montpellier | 1–3 | Paris Saint-Germain | Montpellier |
| 21:00 CET (UTC+1) | Mavididi 41'; Savanier (yellow card) 71' | Report | Kurzawa (yellow card) 13'; Kean (yellow card) 23', (goal) 77'; Dagba 33', (yellow card) 42'; Mbappé 90+1' | Stadium: Stade de la Mosson; Attendance: 0 Referee: Mikael Lesage |

| 13 December 2020 14 | Paris Saint-Germain | 0–1 | Lyon | Paris |
| 21:00 CET (UTC+1) | Kehrer (yellow card) 46'; Paredes (yellow card) 56'; Neymar (yellow card) 71'; Kimpembe (yellow card) 90+5' | Report | Kadewere 35'; Dubois (yellow card) 38'; Mendes (red card) 90+9' | Stadium: Parc des Princes; Attendance: 0 Referee: Benoît Bastien |

| 16 December 2020 15 | Paris Saint-Germain | 2–0 | Lorient | Paris |
| 21:00 CET (UTC+1) | Mbappé (yellow card) 34', (goal) 51' (pen.); Kean (yellow card) 58', (goal) 60'; Fadiga (yellow card) 87' | Report | Gravillon (red card) 49' | Stadium: Parc des Princes; Attendance: 0 Referee: Johan Hamel |

| 20 December 2020 16 | Lille | 0–0 | Paris Saint-Germain | Villeneuve-d'Ascq |
| 21:00 CET (UTC+1) | | Report | Kehrer (yellow card) 6'; Kimpembe (yellow card) 19' | Stadium: Stade Pierre-Mauroy; Attendance: 0 Referee: François Letexier |

| 23 December 2020 17 | Paris Saint-Germain | 4–0 | Strasbourg | Paris |
| 21:00 CET (UTC+1) | Pembélé 18'; Mbappé 80'; Gueye 88'; Kean 90+1' | Report | | Stadium: Parc des Princes; Attendance: 0 Referee: Jérôme Miguelgorry |

| 6 January 2021 18 | Saint-Étienne | 1–1 | Paris Saint-Germain | Saint-Étienne |
| 21:00 CET (UTC+1) | Hamouma 19'; Retsos (yellow card) 77' | Report | Kean 22'; Draxler (yellow card) 83' | Stadium: Stade Geoffroy-Guichard; Attendance: 0 Referee: Clément Turpin |

| 9 January 2021 19 | Paris Saint-Germain | 3–0 | Brest | Paris |
| 21:00 CET (UTC+1) | Kean 16'; Verratti (yellow card) 62'; Icardi 81'; Sarabia 83' | Report | Lasne (yellow card) 76' | Stadium: Parc des Princes; Attendance: 0 Referee: Hakim Ben El Hadj |

| 16 January 2021 20 | Angers | 0–1 | Paris Saint-Germain | Angers |
| 21:00 CET (UTC+1) | | Report | Kurzawa 70'; Verratti (yellow card) 89'; Neymar (yellow card) 90+3' | Stadium: Stade Raymond Kopa; Attendance: 0 Referee: Amaury Delerue |

| 22 January 2021 21 | Paris Saint-Germain | 4–0 | Montpellier | Paris |
| 21:00 CET (UTC+1) | Mbappé 34', 63'; Neymar 60', (yellow card) 76'; Icardi 61'; Verratti (yellow card) 82' | Report | Omlin (red card) 19'; Mendes (yellow card) 45+1' | Stadium: Parc des Princes; Attendance: 0 Referee: Willy Delajod |

| 31 January 2021 22 | Lorient | 3–2 | Paris Saint-Germain | Lorient |
| 15:00 CET (UTC+1) | Le Fée (yellow card) 12'; Monconduit (yellow card) 28'; Abergel 36', (yellow card) 90'; Lemoine (yellow card) 72'; Wissa 80'; Moffi 90+1' | Report | Pereira (yellow card) 2'; Neymar 45' (pen.), 58' (pen.); Paredes (yellow card) 75' | Stadium: Stade du Moustoir; Attendance: 0 Referee: Jérémy Stinat |

| 3 February 2021 23 | Paris Saint-Germain | 3–0 | Nîmes | Paris |
| 21:00 CET (UTC+1) | Di María 18'; Sarabia 36'; Mbappé 68' | Report | | Stadium: Parc des Princes; Attendance: 0 Referee: François Letexier |

| 7 February 2021 24 | Marseille | 0–2 | Paris Saint-Germain | Marseille |
| 21:00 CET (UTC+1) | Gueye (yellow card) 49'; Payet (red card) 90+1' | Report | Mbappé 9'; Icardi 24', (yellow card) 53'; Paredes (yellow card) 45+1' | Stadium: Stade Vélodrome; Attendance: 0 Referee: Benoît Bastien |

| 13 February 2021 25 | Paris Saint-Germain | 2–1 | Nice | Paris |
| 17:00 CET (UTC+1) | Draxler 22'; Kean 76'; Mbappé (yellow card) 87'; Herrera (yellow card) 89' | Report | Lopes 50' | Stadium: Parc des Princes; Attendance: 0 Referee: Jérémie Pignard |

| 21 February 2021 26 | Paris Saint-Germain | 0–2 | Monaco | Paris |
| 21:00 CET (UTC+1) | Gueye (yellow card) 45'; Kimpembe (yellow card) 50'; Paredes (yellow card) 57'; Mbappé (yellow card) 90+3' | Report | Diop 6'; Tchouaméni (yellow card) 15'; Maripán 51' | Stadium: Parc des Princes; Attendance: 0 Referee: Ruddy Buquet |

| 27 February 2021 27 | Dijon | 0–4 | Paris Saint-Germain | Dijon |
| 17:00 CET (UTC+1) | Dina Ebimbe (yellow card) 25'; Celina (yellow card) 31' | Report | Kean 6', (yellow card) 34'; Mbappé 32' (pen.), 51'; Pereira 82' | Stadium: Stade Gaston Gérard; Attendance: 0 Referee: Mikael Lesage |

| 3 March 2021 28 | Bordeaux | 0–1 | Paris Saint-Germain | Bordeaux |
| 21:00 CET (UTC+1) | Seri (yellow card) 18'; Adli (yellow card) 49'; Oudin (yellow card) 90+1' | Report | Sarabia 20', (yellow card) 40'; Pereira (yellow card) 43'; Kurzawa (yellow card) 88' | Stadium: Matmut Atlantique; Attendance: 0 Referee: Frank Schneider |

| 14 March 2021 29 | Paris Saint-Germain | 1–2 | Nantes | Paris |
| 21:00 CET (UTC+1) | Draxler 42'; Rafinha (yellow card) 48'; Verratti (yellow card) 67' | Report | Simon (yellow card) 45', (goal) 71'; Traoré (yellow card) 51'; Kolo Muani 59' | Stadium: Parc des Princes; Attendance: 0 Referee: Karim Abed |

| 21 March 2021 30 | Lyon | 2–4 | Paris Saint-Germain | Décines-Charpieu |
| 21:00 CET (UTC+1) | Kadewere (yellow card) 40'; Slimani 62'; Cornet 81'; Diomandé (yellow card) 90+1' | Report | Mbappé 15', 52'; Pereira 32'; Di María 47' | Stadium: Parc Olympique Lyonnais; Attendance: 0 Referee: Clément Turpin |

| 3 April 2021 31 | Paris Saint-Germain | 0–1 | Lille | Paris |
| 17:00 CEST (UTC+2) | Paredes (yellow card) 17'; Gueye (yellow card) 19'; Neymar (yellow card) 48' (yellow-red card) 90'; Diallo (yellow card) 57'; Mbappé (yellow card) 85' | Report | Fonte (yellow card) 4'; David 20'; Djaló (yellow card) 36' (yellow-red card) 90+1'; André (yellow card) 87' | Stadium: Parc des Princes; Attendance: 0 Referee: Benoît Bastien |

| 10 April 2021 32 | Strasbourg | 1–4 | Paris Saint-Germain | Strasbourg |
| 17:00 CEST (UTC+2) | Sahi 63' | Report | Mbappé 16'; Sarabia 27'; Kean 45', (yellow card) 56'; Paredes 79' | Stadium: Stade de la Meinau; Attendance: 0 Referee: Jérémie Pignard |

| 18 April 2021 33 | Paris Saint-Germain | 3–2 | Saint-Étienne | Paris |
| 13:00 CEST (UTC+2) | Mbappé 79', 87' (pen.); Kimpembe (yellow card) 85'; Icardi 90+6' | Report | Neyou (yellow card) 57'; Bouanga 78'; Hamouma 90+2' | Stadium: Parc des Princes; Attendance: 0 Referee: Ruddy Buquet |

| 24 April 2021 34 | Metz | 1–3 | Paris Saint-Germain | Metz |
| 17:00 CEST (UTC+2) | Angban (yellow card) 15'; Centonze 46' | Report | Mbappé 4', 59', (yellow card) 58'; Verratti (yellow card) 37'; Kurzawa (yellow card) 60'; Herrera (yellow card) 79'; Icardi 89' (pen.) | Stadium: Stade Saint-Symphorien; Attendance: 0 Referee: Willy Delajod |

| 1 May 2021 35 | Paris Saint-Germain | 2–1 | Lens | Paris |
| 17:00 CEST (UTC+2) | Neymar 33'; Marquinhos 59', (yellow card) 90+1'; Herrera (yellow card) 78'; Kehrer (yellow card) 89'; Verratti (yellow card) 90+4' | Report | Ganago 61'; Medina (yellow card) 66'; Sotoca (yellow card) 76' | Stadium: Parc des Princes; Attendance: 0 Referee: Jérôme Brisard |

| 9 May 2021 36 | Rennes | 1–1 | Paris Saint-Germain | Rennes |
| 21:00 CEST (UTC+2) | Aguerd (yellow card) 45+4'; Guirassy 70'; Diouf (yellow card) 80'; Del Castillo (yellow card) 89'; Tait (yellow card) 90+1' | Report | Neymar 45+5' (pen.); Herrera (yellow card) 57'; Kimpembe (red card) 87' | Stadium: Roazhon Park; Attendance: 0 Referee: Ruddy Buquet |

| 16 May 2021 37 | Paris Saint-Germain | 4–0 | Reims | Paris |
| 21:00 CEST (UTC+2) | Neymar 13' (pen.); Mbappé 24'; Marquinhos 68'; Kean 90' | Report | Abdelhamid (red card) 10' | Stadium: Parc des Princes; Attendance: 0 Referee: Clément Turpin |

| 23 May 2021 38 | Brest | 0–2 | Paris Saint-Germain | Brest |
| 21:00 CEST (UTC+2) | Magnetti (yellow card) 35' | Report | Neymar (penalty missed) 19', (yellow card) 33'; Herrera (yellow card) 27'; Faivre 37' (o.g.); Mbappé 71' | Stadium: Stade Francis-Le Blé; Attendance: 0 Referee: Mikael Lesage |

=== Coupe de France ===
| 10 February 2021 Round of 64 | Caen | 0–1 | Paris Saint-Germain | Caen |
| 21:00 CET (UTC+1) | Yago (yellow card) 40'; Beka Beka (yellow card) 55' | Report | Sarabia (yellow card) 31'; Kean 49'; Paredes (yellow card) 60' | Stadium: Stade Michel d'Ornano; Attendance: 0 Referee: Jérôme Miguelgorry |

| 6 March 2021 Round of 32 | Brest | 0–3 | Paris Saint-Germain | Brest |
| 21:10 CET (UTC+1) | | Report | Mbappé 9', 73'; Paredes (yellow card) 27'; Sarabia 44'; Herrera (yellow card) 69' | Stadium: Stade Francis-Le Blé; Attendance: 0 Referee: Jérôme Brisard |

| 17 March 2021 Round of 16 | Paris Saint-Germain | 3–0 | Lille | Paris |
| 17:45 CET (UTC+1) | Rafinha (yellow card) 3'; Icardi 9'; Mbappé 41' (pen.), 90+3', (yellow card) 77'; Gueye (yellow card) 64' | Report | Bradarić (yellow card) 18'; Djaló (yellow card) 40'; Xeka (yellow card) 44'; Yazıcı (penalty missed) 78'; Ikoné (yellow card) 80' | Stadium: Parc des Princes; Attendance: 0 Referee: Willy Delajod |

| 21 April 2021 Quarter-finals | Paris Saint-Germain | 5–0 | Angers | Paris |
| 18:45 CEST (UTC+2) | Icardi 9', 68', 90'; Manceau 23' (o.g.); Paredes (yellow card) 31'; Neymar 65' | Report | Mangani (yellow card) 51' | Stadium: Parc des Princes; Attendance: 0 Referee: Amaury Delerue |

| 12 May 2021 Semi-finals | Montpellier | 2–2 (5–6 p) | Paris Saint-Germain | Montpellier |
| 21:00 CEST (UTC+2) | Laborde 45'; Ferri (yellow card) 52'; Mollet (yellow card) 65'; Delort 83'; Savanier (yellow card) 89' | Report | Mbappé 10', 50'; Bakker (yellow card) 89'; Neymar (yellow card) 90' | Stadium: Stade de la Mosson; Attendance: 0 Referee: Jérémie Pignard |
| | Penalties |
| | Savanier (penalty scored); Delort (penalty scored); Mavididi (penalty scored); Ristić (penalty scored); Laborde (penalty scored); Sambia (penalty missed) | | (penalty scored) Di María; (penalty scored) Draxler; (penalty scored) Paredes; (penalty scored) Marquinhos; (penalty scored) Neymar; (penalty scored) Kean |

| 19 May 2021 Final | Monaco | 0–2 | Paris Saint-Germain | Saint-Denis |
| 21:15 CEST (UTC+2) | | Report | Icardi 19'; Mbappé 81'; Marquinhos (yellow card) 86' | Stadium: Stade de France; Attendance: 0 Referee: François Letexier |

=== Trophée des Champions ===
| 13 January 2021 Final | Paris Saint-Germain | 2–1 | Marseille | Lens |
| 21:00 CET (UTC+1) | Icardi 39'; Neymar 85' (pen.); Mbappé (yellow card) 90+4' | Report | Radonjić (yellow card) 17'; Nagatomo (yellow card) 26'; Lirola (yellow card) 72'; Álvaro (yellow card) 77'; Payet 89' | Stadium: Stade Bollaert-Delelis; Attendance: 0 Referee: Ruddy Buquet |

=== UEFA Champions League ===
==== Group stage ====
The group stage draw was held on 1 October 2020.

| Pos | Team | Pld | W | D | L | GF | GA | GD | Pts | Qualification | PAR | RBL | MUN | IBS |
|---|---|---|---|---|---|---|---|---|---|---|---|---|---|---|
| 1 | (France) Paris Saint-Germain | 6 | 4 | 0 | 2 | 13 | 6 | +7 | 12 (Note: Tied on head-to-head points (3). Head-to-head away goals: Paris Saint-Germain 1, RB Leipzig 0.) | Advance to knockout phase | — | 1–0 | 1–2 | 5–1 |
| 2 | (Germany) RB Leipzig | 6 | 4 | 0 | 2 | 11 | 12 | −1 | 12 | Advance to knockout phase | 2–1 | — | 3–2 | 2–0 |
| 3 | (England) Manchester United | 6 | 3 | 0 | 3 | 15 | 10 | +5 | 9 | Transfer to Europa League | 1–3 | 5–0 | — | 4–1 |
| 4 | (Turkey) İstanbul Başakşehir | 6 | 1 | 0 | 5 | 7 | 18 | −11 | 3 | | 0–2 | 3–4 | 2–1 | — |

Source: UEFA
Rules for classification: Group stage tiebreakers
Notes:

| 20 October 2020 1 | Paris Saint-Germain (France) | 1–2 | (England) Manchester United | Paris, France |
| 21:00 CEST (UTC+2) | Neymar (yellow card) 35'; Martial 55' (o.g.); Pereira (yellow card) 84'; Kean (yellow card) 90' | Report | Fernandes 23' (pen.); McTominay (yellow card) 36'; Tuanzebe (yellow card) 72'; Rashford 87' | Stadium: Parc de Princes; Attendance: 0 (Note: Due to the COVID-19 pandemic in Europe, the match was played behind closed doors.); Referee: Antonio Mateu Lahoz (Spain) |

| 28 October 2020 2 | İstanbul Başakşehir (Turkey) | 0–2 | (France) Paris Saint-Germain | Istanbul, Turkey |
| 18:55 CET (UTC+1) | Crivelli (yellow card) 3'; Epureanu (yellow card) 49'; Topal (yellow card) 54' | Report | Kean 64', 79'; Kehrer (yellow card) 83' | Stadium: Fatih Terim Stadium; Attendance: 350; Referee: Andreas Ekberg (Sweden) |

| 4 November 2020 3 | RB Leipzig (Germany) | 2–1 | (France) Paris Saint-Germain | Leipzig, Germany |
| 21:00 CET (UTC+1) | Upamecano (yellow card) 15'; Konaté (yellow card) 25'; Nkunku 42'; Forsberg 57' (pen.) | Report | Di María 6', (penalty missed) 16'; Kimpembe (yellow card) 19' (yellow-red card) 90+5'; Gueye (yellow card) 37' (yellow-red card) 69'; Kurzawa (yellow card) 68' | Stadium: Red Bull Arena; Attendance: 0 Referee: Szymon Marciniak (Poland) |

| 24 November 2020 4 | Paris Saint-Germain (France) | 1–0 | (Germany) RB Leipzig | Paris, France |
| 21:00 CET (UTC+1) | Neymar 11' (pen.), (yellow card) 40'; Paredes (yellow card) 41'; Rafinha (yellow card) 77'; Herrera (yellow card) 82'; Verratti (yellow card) 84' | Report | Forsberg (yellow card) 2' | Stadium: Parc de Princes; Attendance: 0 Referee: Danny Makkelie (Netherlands) |

| 2 December 2020 5 | Manchester United (England) | 1–3 | (France) Paris Saint-Germain | Manchester, England |
| 21:00 CET (UTC+1) | Fred (yellow card) 23' (yellow-red card) 70'; Rashford 32' | Report | Neymar 6', 90+1'; Paredes (yellow card) 38'; Verratti (yellow card) 59'; Marquinhos 69' | Stadium: Old Trafford; Attendance: 638; Referee: Daniele Orsato (Italy) |

| 9 December 2020 6 | Paris Saint-Germain (France) | 5–1 | (Turkey) İstanbul Başakşehir | Paris, France |
| 18:55 CET (UTC+1) | Neymar 21', 38', 50'; Mbappé 42' (pen.), 62'; Pembélé (yellow card) 90+2' | Report | Tekdemir (yellow card) 10'; Rafael (yellow card) 12'; Günok (yellow card) 42'; Topal 57'; Crivelli (yellow card) 63' | Stadium: Parc de Princes; Attendance: 0 Referee: Ovidiu Hațegan (Romania) and Danny Makkelie (Netherlands) |
Note: İstanbul Başakşehir's assistant manager Pierre Webó was sent off (red card) in the 14th minute. The Paris Saint-Germain v İstanbul Başakşehir match was suspended after 14 minutes on 8 December 2020, with the score 0–0 at the time, as both teams left the pitch in protest after an alleged racist incident by a match official directed at the assistant manager Pierre Webó of İstanbul Başakşehir. The match was resumed on 9 December 2020, 18:55 CET, with a new team of match officials. Pierre Webó's red card was also rescinded.

==== Knockout phase ====
===== Round of 16 =====
The draw for the round of 16 was held on 14 December 2020.

| 16 February 2021 First leg | Barcelona (Spain) | 1–4 | (France) Paris Saint-Germain | Barcelona, Spain |
| 21:00 CET (UTC+1) | Messi 27' (pen.) | Report | Gueye (yellow card) 20'; Mbappé 32', 65', 85'; Kean 70' | Stadium: Camp Nou; Attendance: 0 Referee: Björn Kuipers (Netherlands) |

| 10 March 2021 Second leg | Paris Saint-Germain (France) | 1–1 (5–2 agg.) | (Spain) Barcelona | Paris, France |
| 21:00 CET (UTC+1) | Kurzawa (yellow card) 8'; Mbappé 31' (pen.); Gueye (yellow card) 50'; Paredes (yellow card) 50'; Icardi (yellow card) 89' | Report | Mingueza (yellow card) 25'; Lenglet (yellow card) 30'; Messi 37', (penalty missed) 45+3'; De Jong (yellow card) 38' | Stadium: Parc des Princes; Attendance: 0 Referee: Anthony Taylor (England) |

===== Quarter-finals =====
The draw for the quarter-finals was held on 19 March 2021.

| 7 April 2021 First leg | Bayern Munich (Germany) | 2–3 | (France) Paris Saint-Germain | Munich, Germany |
| 21:00 CEST (UTC+2) | Hernandez (yellow card) 35'; Choupo-Moting 37', (yellow card) 89'; Müller 60'; Kimmich (yellow card) 70'; Boateng (yellow card) 72' | Report | Mbappé 3', 68'; Marquinhos 28'; Draxler (yellow card) 62' | Stadium: Allianz Arena; Attendance: 0 Referee: Antonio Mateu Lahoz (Spain) |

| 13 April 2021 Second leg | Paris Saint-Germain (France) | 0–1 (3 (a)–3 agg.) | (Germany) Bayern Munich | Paris, France |
| 21:00 CEST (UTC+2) | Dagba (yellow card) 55'; Herrera (yellow card) 90' | Report | Choupo-Moting 40'; Alaba (yellow card) 52'; Müller (yellow card) 68' | Stadium: Parc des Princes; Attendance: 0 Referee: Daniele Orsato (Italy) |

===== Semi-finals =====
The draw for the semi-finals was held on 19 March 2021, after the quarter-final draw.

| 28 April 2021 First leg | Paris Saint-Germain (France) | 1–2 | (England) Manchester City | Paris, France |
| 21:00 CEST (UTC+2) | Marquinhos 15'; Paredes (yellow card) 70'; Neymar (yellow card) 74'; Gueye (red card) 77' | Report | Cancelo (yellow card) 31'; De Bruyne 64', (yellow card) 86'; Mahrez 71' | Stadium: Parc des Princes; Attendance: 0 Referee: Felix Brych (Germany) |

| 4 May 2021 Second leg | Manchester City (England) | 2–0 (4–1 agg.) | (France) Paris Saint-Germain | Manchester, England |
| 20:00 BST (UTC+1) | Mahrez 11', 63'; Zinchenko (yellow card) 72'; De Bruyne (yellow card) 74' | Report | Herrera (yellow card) 22'; Di María (red card) 69'; Verratti (yellow card) 71'; Kimpembe (yellow card) 87'; Pereira (yellow card) 89' | Stadium: City of Manchester Stadium; Attendance: 0 Referee: Björn Kuipers (Netherlands) |

== Statistics ==
=== Appearances and goals ===
| No. | Pos | Nat | Player | Total | | Ligue 1 | | Coupe de France | | Trophée des Champions | | UEFA Champions League | |
| No. | Pos | Nat | Player | Apps | Goals | Apps | Goals | Apps | Goals | Apps | Goals | Apps | Goals |
Goalkeepers
| 1 | GK | (Costa Rica) CRC | Keylor Navas | 45 | 0 | 29 | 0 | 3 | 0 | 1 | 0 | 12 | 0 |
| 16 | GK | (Spain) ESP | Sergio Rico | 13 | 0 | 8+2 | 0 | 3 | 0 | 0 | 0 | 0 | 0 |
| 30 | GK | (France) FRA | Alexandre Letellier | 0 | 0 | 0 | 0 | 0 | 0 | 0 | 0 | 0 | 0 |
Defenders
| 3 | DF | (France) FRA | Presnel Kimpembe | 40 | 0 | 26+2 | 0 | 0 | 0 | 0+1 | 0 | 11 | 0 |
| 4 | DF | (Germany) GER | Thilo Kehrer | 33 | 0 | 16+8 | 0 | 4 | 0 | 0 | 0 | 0+5 | 0 |
| 5 | DF | (Brazil) BRA | Marquinhos | 40 | 6 | 24+1 | 3 | 3+1 | 0 | 1 | 0 | 10 | 3 |
| 14 | DF | (Spain) ESP | Juan Bernat | 3 | 0 | 2+1 | 0 | 0 | 0 | 0 | 0 | 0 | 0 |
| 20 | DF | (France) FRA | Layvin Kurzawa | 27 | 1 | 15+4 | 1 | 1+1 | 0 | 1 | 0 | 5 | 0 |
| 22 | DF | (Senegal) SEN | Abdou Diallo | 36 | 0 | 17+5 | 0 | 5 | 0 | 1 | 0 | 6+2 | 0 |
| 24 | DF | (Italy) ITA | Alessandro Florenzi | 36 | 2 | 18+3 | 2 | 3+1 | 0 | 1 | 0 | 10 | 0 |
| 25 | DF | (Netherlands) NED | Mitchel Bakker | 40 | 0 | 18+8 | 0 | 4 | 0 | 0 | 0 | 3+7 | 0 |
| 31 | DF | (France) FRA | Colin Dagba | 33 | 1 | 15+10 | 1 | 2+1 | 0 | 0 | 0 | 2+3 | 0 |
| 32 | DF | (France) FRA | Timothée Pembélé | 9 | 1 | 3+3 | 1 | 0+2 | 0 | 0 | 0 | 0+1 | 0 |
Midfielders
| 6 | MF | (Italy) ITA | Marco Verratti | 31 | 0 | 16+5 | 0 | 1+1 | 0 | 1 | 0 | 6+1 | 0 |
| 8 | MF | (Argentina) ARG | Leandro Paredes | 36 | 1 | 16+5 | 1 | 6 | 0 | 1 | 0 | 8 | 0 |
| 11 | MF | (Argentina) ARG | Ángel Di María | 43 | 6 | 23+4 | 5 | 3+2 | 0 | 1 | 0 | 8+2 | 1 |
| 12 | MF | (Brazil) BRA | Rafinha | 34 | 0 | 15+8 | 0 | 2+1 | 0 | 0 | 0 | 1+7 | 0 |
| 15 | MF | (Portugal) POR | Danilo Pereira | 42 | 2 | 16+7 | 2 | 4+2 | 0 | 0+1 | 0 | 8+4 | 0 |
| 19 | MF | (Spain) ESP | Pablo Sarabia | 37 | 7 | 13+14 | 6 | 3+2 | 1 | 0+1 | 0 | 1+3 | 0 |
| 21 | MF | (Spain) ESP | Ander Herrera | 45 | 1 | 18+13 | 1 | 1+2 | 0 | 1 | 0 | 5+5 | 0 |
| 23 | MF | (Germany) GER | Julian Draxler | 34 | 4 | 12+12 | 4 | 3+2 | 0 | 0 | 0 | 3+2 | 0 |
| 27 | MF | (Senegal) SEN | Idrissa Gueye | 44 | 2 | 20+8 | 2 | 4+2 | 0 | 0 | 0 | 7+3 | 0 |
| 34 | MF | (Netherlands) NED | Xavi Simons | 2 | 0 | 0+1 | 0 | 0+1 | 0 | 0 | 0 | 0 | 0 |
| 36 | MF | (France) FRA | Kays Ruiz-Atil | 7 | 0 | 1+6 | 0 | 0 | 0 | 0 | 0 | 0 | 0 |
| 38 | MF | (France) FRA | Édouard Michut | 1 | 0 | 0+1 | 0 | 0 | 0 | 0 | 0 | 0 | 0 |
Forwards
| 7 | FW | (France) FRA | Kylian Mbappé | 47 | 42 | 27+4 | 27 | 3+2 | 7 | 1 | 0 | 10 | 8 |
| 9 | FW | (Argentina) ARG | Mauro Icardi | 28 | 13 | 11+9 | 7 | 4 | 5 | 1 | 1 | 3 | 0 |
| 10 | FW | (Brazil) BRA | Neymar | 31 | 17 | 15+3 | 9 | 2+1 | 1 | 0+1 | 1 | 9 | 6 |
| 18 | FW | (Italy) ITA | Moise Kean | 41 | 17 | 22+4 | 13 | 2+3 | 1 | 0+1 | 0 | 4+5 | 3 |
| 39 | FW | (France) FRA | Kenny Nagera | 1 | 0 | 0+1 | 0 | 0 | 0 | 0 | 0 | 0 | 0 |
Players transferred out during the season
| 29 | FW | (France) FRA | Arnaud Kalimuendo | 1 | 0 | 1 | 0 | 0 | 0 | 0 | 0 | 0 | 0 |
| 30 | GK | (Poland) POL | Marcin Bułka | 1 | 0 | 1 | 0 | 0 | 0 | 0 | 0 | 0 | 0 |
| 33 | MF | (France) FRA | Bandiougou Fadiga | 6 | 0 | 0+6 | 0 | 0 | 0 | 0 | 0 | 0 | 0 |
| 35 | FW | (Spain) ESP | Jesé | 2 | 0 | 0+2 | 0 | 0 | 0 | 0 | 0 | 0 | 0 |

Source: Competitions

=== Goalscorers ===
| Rank | No. | Pos. | Nat. | Player | Ligue 1 | Coupe de France | Trophée des Champions | Champions League | Total |
|---|---|---|---|---|---|---|---|---|---|
| 1 | 7 | FW | (France) | Kylian Mbappé | 27 | 7 | 0 | 8 | 42 |
| 2 | 10 | FW | (Brazil) | Neymar | 9 | 1 | 1 | 6 | 17 |
| 2 | 18 | FW | (Italy) | Moise Kean | 13 | 1 | 0 | 3 | 17 |
| 4 | 9 | FW | (Argentina) | Mauro Icardi | 7 | 5 | 1 | 0 | 13 |
| 5 | 19 | MF | (Spain) | Pablo Sarabia | 6 | 1 | 0 | 0 | 7 |
| 6 | 5 | DF | (Brazil) | Marquinhos | 3 | 0 | 0 | 3 | 6 |
| 6 | 11 | MF | (Argentina) | Ángel Di María | 5 | 0 | 0 | 1 | 6 |
| 8 | 23 | MF | (Germany) | Julian Draxler | 4 | 0 | 0 | 0 | 4 |
| 9 | 15 | MF | (Portugal) | Danilo Pereira | 2 | 0 | 0 | 0 | 2 |
| 9 | 24 | DF | (Italy) | Alessandro Florenzi | 2 | 0 | 0 | 0 | 2 |
| 9 | 27 | MF | (Senegal) | Idrissa Gueye | 2 | 0 | 0 | 0 | 2 |
| 12 | 8 | MF | (Argentina) | Leandro Paredes | 1 | 0 | 0 | 0 | 1 |
| 12 | 20 | DF | (France) | Layvin Kurzawa | 1 | 0 | 0 | 0 | 1 |
| 12 | 21 | MF | (Spain) | Ander Herrera | 1 | 0 | 0 | 0 | 1 |
| 12 | 31 | DF | (France) | Colin Dagba | 1 | 0 | 0 | 0 | 1 |
| 12 | 32 | DF | (France) | Timothée Pembélé | 1 | 0 | 0 | 0 | 1 |
| Own goals | | | | | 1 | 1 | 0 | 1 | 3 |
| Totals | | | | | 86 | 16 | 2 | 22 | 126 |
