= 2018 FIFA World Cup squads =

National team squads for the 2018 FIFA World Cup

The 2018 FIFA World Cup was an international football tournament held in Russia from 14 June to 15 July 2018. The 32 national teams involved in the tournament were required to register a squad of 23 players, including three goalkeepers. Only players in these squads were eligible to take part in the tournament.

A provisional list of 35 players per national team was submitted to FIFA by 14 May 2018, one month prior to the opening match of the tournament. From the preliminary squad, the final list of 23 players per national team was submitted to FIFA by 4 June, 10 days prior to the opening match of the tournament. FIFA published the final lists with squad numbers on their website the same day. Teams were permitted to make late replacements in the event of serious injury, at any time up to 24 hours before their first match, where the replacement players did not need to be in the preliminary squad.

For players named in the 35-player preliminary squad, there was a mandatory rest period between 21 and 27 May 2018, except for those involved in the 2018 UEFA Champions League Final played on 26 May. Initially the preliminary squads were to have 30 players but, in February 2018, it was announced that the number of players to be named in the provisional squads was increased to 35.

The position listed for each player is per the official squad list published by FIFA. The age listed for each player is on 14 June 2018, the first day of the tournament. The numbers of caps and goals listed for each player do not include any matches played after the start of the tournament. The club listed is the club for which the player last played a competitive match prior to the tournament. (Note: This is the club a player was last able to play for during the previous season in the event a player did not play a competitive match.) The nationality for each club reflects the national association (not the league) to which the club is affiliated. A flag is included for coaches who are of a different nationality than their own national team.

== Group A ==
=== Egypt ===
Coach: (Argentina) Héctor Cúper

Egypt's 29-man preliminary squad was announced on 13 May 2018. The final squad was announced on 4 June.

| No. | Pos. | Player | Date of birth (age) | Caps | Goals | Club |
|---|---|---|---|---|---|---|
| 1 | GK | Essam El Hadary (captain) | 15 January 1973 (aged 45) | 158 | 0 | (Saudi Arabian Football Federation) Al Taawoun |
| 2 | DF | Ali Gabr | 1 January 1989 (aged 29) | 21 | 1 | (The Football Association) West Bromwich Albion |
| 3 | DF | Ahmed Elmohamady | 9 September 1987 (aged 30) | 78 | 2 | (The Football Association) Aston Villa |
| 4 | MF | Omar Gaber | 30 January 1992 (aged 26) | 24 | 0 | (United States Soccer Federation) Los Angeles FC |
| 5 | MF | Sam Morsy | 10 September 1991 (aged 26) | 5 | 0 | (The Football Association) Wigan Athletic |
| 6 | DF | Ahmed Hegazi | 25 January 1991 (aged 27) | 45 | 1 | (The Football Association) West Bromwich Albion |
| 7 | DF | Ahmed Fathy | 10 November 1984 (aged 33) | 126 | 3 | (Egyptian Football Association) Al Ahly |
| 8 | MF | Tarek Hamed | 24 October 1988 (aged 29) | 21 | 0 | (Egyptian Football Association) Zamalek |
| 9 | FW | Marwan Mohsen | 26 February 1989 (aged 29) | 24 | 4 | (Egyptian Football Association) Al Ahly |
| 10 | FW | Mohamed Salah | 15 June 1992 (aged 25) | 57 | 33 | (The Football Association) Liverpool |
| 11 | FW | Kahraba | 13 April 1994 (aged 24) | 19 | 3 | (Saudi Arabian Football Federation) Al-Ittihad |
| 12 | DF | Ayman Ashraf | 9 April 1991 (aged 27) | 4 | 0 | (Egyptian Football Association) Al Ahly |
| 13 | DF | Mohamed Abdel Shafy | 1 July 1985 (aged 32) | 51 | 1 | (Saudi Arabian Football Federation) Al Fateh |
| 14 | FW | Ramadan Sobhi | 23 January 1997 (aged 21) | 23 | 1 | (The Football Association) Stoke City |
| 15 | DF | Mahmoud Hamdy | 1 June 1995 (aged 23) | 0 | 0 | (Egyptian Football Association) Zamalek |
| 16 | GK | Sherif Ekramy | 10 July 1983 (aged 34) | 22 | 0 | (Egyptian Football Association) Al Ahly |
| 17 | MF | Mohamed Elneny | 11 July 1992 (aged 25) | 61 | 5 | (The Football Association) Arsenal |
| 18 | FW | Shikabala | 5 March 1986 (aged 32) | 29 | 2 | (Saudi Arabian Football Federation) Al Raed |
| 19 | MF | Abdallah El Said | 13 July 1985 (aged 32) | 36 | 6 | (Football Association of Finland) KuPS |
| 20 | DF | Saad Samir | 1 April 1989 (aged 29) | 11 | 0 | (Egyptian Football Association) Al Ahly |
| 21 | MF | Trézéguet | 1 October 1994 (aged 23) | 24 | 2 | (Turkish Football Federation) Kasımpaşa |
| 22 | FW | Amr Warda | 17 September 1993 (aged 24) | 16 | 0 | (Hellenic Football Federation) Atromitos |
| 23 | GK | Mohamed El Shenawy | 18 December 1988 (aged 29) | 3 | 0 | (Egyptian Football Association) Al Ahly |

=== Russia ===
Coach: Stanislav Cherchesov

Russia's 28-man preliminary squad was announced on 11 May 2018. Ruslan Kambolov withdrew injured and was replaced by Sergei Ignashevich on 14 May. The final squad was announced on 3 June.

| No. | Pos. | Player | Date of birth (age) | Caps | Goals | Club |
|---|---|---|---|---|---|---|
| 1 | GK | Igor Akinfeev (captain) | 8 April 1986 (aged 32) | 106 | 0 | (Russian Football Union) CSKA Moscow |
| 2 | DF | Mário Fernandes | 19 September 1990 (aged 27) | 5 | 0 | (Russian Football Union) CSKA Moscow |
| 3 | DF | Ilya Kutepov | 29 July 1993 (aged 24) | 7 | 0 | (Russian Football Union) Spartak Moscow |
| 4 | DF | Sergei Ignashevich | 14 July 1979 (aged 38) | 122 | 8 | (Russian Football Union) CSKA Moscow |
| 5 | DF | Andrei Semyonov | 24 March 1989 (aged 29) | 6 | 0 | (Russian Football Union) Akhmat Grozny |
| 6 | MF | Denis Cheryshev | 26 December 1990 (aged 27) | 11 | 0 | (Royal Spanish Football Federation) Villarreal |
| 7 | MF | Daler Kuzyayev | 15 January 1993 (aged 25) | 6 | 0 | (Russian Football Union) Zenit Saint Petersburg |
| 8 | MF | Yury Gazinsky | 20 July 1989 (aged 28) | 6 | 0 | (Russian Football Union) Krasnodar |
| 9 | MF | Alan Dzagoev | 17 June 1990 (aged 27) | 57 | 9 | (Russian Football Union) CSKA Moscow |
| 10 | FW | Fyodor Smolov | 9 February 1990 (aged 28) | 32 | 12 | (Russian Football Union) Krasnodar |
| 11 | MF | Roman Zobnin | 11 February 1994 (aged 24) | 12 | 0 | (Russian Football Union) Spartak Moscow |
| 12 | GK | Andrey Lunyov | 13 November 1991 (aged 26) | 3 | 0 | (Russian Football Union) Zenit Saint Petersburg |
| 13 | DF | Fyodor Kudryashov | 5 April 1987 (aged 31) | 19 | 0 | (Russian Football Union) Rubin Kazan |
| 14 | DF | Vladimir Granat | 22 May 1987 (aged 31) | 12 | 1 | (Russian Football Union) Rubin Kazan |
| 15 | MF | Aleksei Miranchuk | 17 October 1995 (aged 22) | 18 | 4 | (Russian Football Union) Lokomotiv Moscow |
| 16 | MF | Anton Miranchuk | 17 October 1995 (aged 22) | 6 | 0 | (Russian Football Union) Lokomotiv Moscow |
| 17 | MF | Aleksandr Golovin | 30 May 1996 (aged 22) | 19 | 2 | (Russian Football Union) CSKA Moscow |
| 18 | MF | Yuri Zhirkov | 20 August 1983 (aged 34) | 84 | 2 | (Russian Football Union) Zenit Saint Petersburg |
| 19 | MF | Aleksandr Samedov | 19 July 1984 (aged 33) | 48 | 7 | (Russian Football Union) Spartak Moscow |
| 20 | GK | Vladimir Gabulov | 19 October 1983 (aged 34) | 10 | 0 | (Royal Belgian Football Association) Club Brugge |
| 21 | MF | Aleksandr Yerokhin | 13 October 1989 (aged 28) | 17 | 0 | (Russian Football Union) Zenit Saint Petersburg |
| 22 | FW | Artem Dzyuba | 22 August 1988 (aged 29) | 23 | 11 | (Russian Football Union) Arsenal Tula |
| 23 | DF | Igor Smolnikov | 8 August 1988 (aged 29) | 27 | 0 | (Russian Football Union) Zenit Saint Petersburg |

=== Saudi Arabia ===
Coach: (Spain) Juan Antonio Pizzi

Saudi Arabia's 28-man preliminary squad was announced on 17 May 2018. The final squad was announced on 4 June.

| No. | Pos. | Player | Date of birth (age) | Caps | Goals | Club |
|---|---|---|---|---|---|---|
| 1 | GK | Abdullah Al-Mayouf | 23 January 1987 (aged 31) | 11 | 0 | (Saudi Arabian Football Federation) Al Hilal |
| 2 | DF | Mansoor Al-Harbi | 19 October 1987 (aged 30) | 40 | 1 | (Saudi Arabian Football Federation) Al Ahli |
| 3 | DF | Osama Hawsawi (captain) | 31 March 1984 (aged 34) | 135 | 7 | (Saudi Arabian Football Federation) Al Hilal |
| 4 | DF | Ali Al-Bulaihi | 21 November 1989 (aged 28) | 4 | 0 | (Saudi Arabian Football Federation) Al Hilal |
| 5 | DF | Omar Hawsawi | 27 September 1985 (aged 32) | 42 | 3 | (Saudi Arabian Football Federation) Al Nassr |
| 6 | DF | Mohammed Al-Breik | 15 September 1992 (aged 25) | 11 | 1 | (Saudi Arabian Football Federation) Al Hilal |
| 7 | MF | Salman Al-Faraj | 1 August 1989 (aged 28) | 43 | 3 | (Saudi Arabian Football Federation) Al Hilal |
| 8 | MF | Yahya Al-Shehri | 26 June 1990 (aged 27) | 57 | 8 | (Royal Spanish Football Federation) Leganés |
| 9 | MF | Hattan Bahebri | 16 July 1992 (aged 25) | 5 | 0 | (Saudi Arabian Football Federation) Al Shabab |
| 10 | FW | Mohammad Al-Sahlawi | 10 January 1987 (aged 31) | 40 | 28 | (Saudi Arabian Football Federation) Al Nassr |
| 11 | MF | Abdulmalek Al-Khaibri | 13 March 1986 (aged 32) | 36 | 0 | (Saudi Arabian Football Federation) Al Hilal |
| 12 | MF | Mohamed Kanno | 22 September 1994 (aged 23) | 6 | 1 | (Saudi Arabian Football Federation) Al Hilal |
| 13 | DF | Yasser Al-Shahrani | 25 May 1992 (aged 26) | 37 | 0 | (Saudi Arabian Football Federation) Al Hilal |
| 14 | MF | Abdullah Otayf | 3 August 1992 (aged 25) | 16 | 1 | (Saudi Arabian Football Federation) Al Hilal |
| 15 | MF | Abdullah Al-Khaibari | 16 August 1996 (aged 21) | 5 | 0 | (Saudi Arabian Football Federation) Al Shabab |
| 16 | MF | Housain Al-Mogahwi | 24 March 1988 (aged 30) | 18 | 1 | (Saudi Arabian Football Federation) Al Ahli |
| 17 | MF | Taisir Al-Jassim | 25 July 1984 (aged 33) | 132 | 19 | (Saudi Arabian Football Federation) Al Ahli |
| 18 | MF | Salem Al-Dawsari | 19 August 1991 (aged 26) | 33 | 4 | (Royal Spanish Football Federation) Villarreal |
| 19 | FW | Fahad Al-Muwallad | 14 September 1994 (aged 23) | 45 | 10 | (Royal Spanish Football Federation) Levante |
| 20 | FW | Muhannad Assiri | 14 October 1986 (aged 31) | 18 | 4 | (Saudi Arabian Football Federation) Al Ahli |
| 21 | GK | Yasser Al-Mosailem | 27 February 1984 (aged 34) | 32 | 0 | (Saudi Arabian Football Federation) Al Ahli |
| 22 | GK | Mohammed Al-Owais | 10 October 1991 (aged 26) | 6 | 0 | (Saudi Arabian Football Federation) Al Ahli |
| 23 | DF | Motaz Hawsawi | 17 February 1992 (aged 26) | 17 | 0 | (Saudi Arabian Football Federation) Al Ahli |

=== Uruguay ===
Coach: Óscar Tabárez

Uruguay's 26-man preliminary squad was announced on 15 May 2018. The final squad was announced on 2 June.

| No. | Pos. | Player | Date of birth (age) | Caps | Goals | Club |
|---|---|---|---|---|---|---|
| 1 | GK | Fernando Muslera | 16 June 1986 (aged 31) | 97 | 0 | (Turkish Football Federation) Galatasaray |
| 2 | DF | José Giménez | 20 January 1995 (aged 23) | 42 | 5 | (Royal Spanish Football Federation) Atlético Madrid |
| 3 | DF | Diego Godín (captain) | 16 February 1986 (aged 32) | 116 | 8 | (Royal Spanish Football Federation) Atlético Madrid |
| 4 | DF | Guillermo Varela | 24 March 1993 (aged 25) | 3 | 0 | (Uruguayan Football Association) Peñarol |
| 5 | MF | Carlos Sánchez | 2 December 1984 (aged 33) | 36 | 1 | (Mexican Football Federation) Monterrey |
| 6 | MF | Rodrigo Bentancur | 25 June 1997 (aged 20) | 7 | 0 | (Italian Football Federation) Juventus |
| 7 | MF | Cristian Rodríguez | 30 September 1985 (aged 32) | 105 | 11 | (Uruguayan Football Association) Peñarol |
| 8 | MF | Nahitan Nández | 28 December 1995 (aged 22) | 12 | 0 | (Argentine Football Association) Boca Juniors |
| 9 | FW | Luis Suárez | 24 January 1987 (aged 31) | 98 | 51 | (Royal Spanish Football Federation) Barcelona |
| 10 | FW | Giorgian de Arrascaeta | 1 June 1994 (aged 24) | 14 | 2 | (Brazilian Football Confederation) Cruzeiro |
| 11 | FW | Cristhian Stuani | 12 October 1986 (aged 31) | 41 | 5 | (Royal Spanish Football Federation) Girona |
| 12 | GK | Martín Campaña | 29 May 1989 (aged 29) | 1 | 0 | (Argentine Football Association) Independiente |
| 13 | DF | Gastón Silva | 5 March 1994 (aged 24) | 17 | 0 | (Argentine Football Association) Independiente |
| 14 | MF | Lucas Torreira | 11 February 1996 (aged 22) | 3 | 0 | (Italian Football Federation) Sampdoria |
| 15 | MF | Matías Vecino | 24 August 1991 (aged 26) | 22 | 1 | (Italian Football Federation) Inter Milan |
| 16 | DF | Maxi Pereira | 8 June 1984 (aged 34) | 125 | 3 | (Portuguese Football Federation) Porto |
| 17 | MF | Diego Laxalt | 7 February 1993 (aged 25) | 6 | 0 | (Italian Football Federation) Genoa |
| 18 | FW | Maxi Gómez | 14 August 1996 (aged 21) | 5 | 0 | (Royal Spanish Football Federation) Celta Vigo |
| 19 | DF | Sebastián Coates | 7 October 1990 (aged 27) | 30 | 1 | (Portuguese Football Federation) Sporting CP |
| 20 | FW | Jonathan Urretaviscaya | 19 March 1990 (aged 28) | 4 | 0 | (Mexican Football Federation) Monterrey |
| 21 | FW | Edinson Cavani | 14 February 1987 (aged 31) | 101 | 42 | (French Football Federation) Paris Saint-Germain |
| 22 | DF | Martín Cáceres | 7 April 1987 (aged 31) | 76 | 4 | (Italian Football Federation) Lazio |
| 23 | GK | Martín Silva | 25 March 1983 (aged 35) | 11 | 0 | (Brazilian Football Confederation) Vasco da Gama |

== Group B ==
=== Iran ===
Coach: (Portugal) Carlos Queiroz

Iran's 35-man preliminary squad was announced on 13 May 2018. The squad was reduced to 24 players on 20 May. The final squad was announced on 4 June.

| No. | Pos. | Player | Date of birth (age) | Caps | Goals | Club |
|---|---|---|---|---|---|---|
| 1 | GK | Alireza Beiranvand | 21 September 1992 (aged 25) | 22 | 0 | (Football Federation Islamic Republic of Iran) Persepolis |
| 2 | MF | Mehdi Torabi | 10 September 1994 (aged 23) | 17 | 4 | (Football Federation Islamic Republic of Iran) Saipa |
| 3 | DF | Ehsan Hajsafi | 25 February 1990 (aged 28) | 94 | 6 | (Hellenic Football Federation) Olympiacos |
| 4 | MF | Rouzbeh Cheshmi | 24 July 1993 (aged 24) | 10 | 1 | (Football Federation Islamic Republic of Iran) Esteghlal |
| 5 | DF | Milad Mohammadi | 29 September 1993 (aged 24) | 19 | 0 | (Russian Football Union) Akhmat Grozny |
| 6 | MF | Saeid Ezatolahi | 1 October 1996 (aged 21) | 25 | 1 | (Russian Football Union) Amkar Perm |
| 7 | MF | Masoud Shojaei (captain) | 9 June 1984 (aged 34) | 74 | 8 | (Hellenic Football Federation) AEK Athens |
| 8 | DF | Morteza Pouraliganji | 19 April 1992 (aged 26) | 27 | 2 | (Qatar Football Association) Al Sadd |
| 9 | MF | Omid Ebrahimi | 16 September 1987 (aged 30) | 30 | 0 | (Football Federation Islamic Republic of Iran) Esteghlal |
| 10 | FW | Karim Ansarifard | 3 April 1990 (aged 28) | 64 | 17 | (Hellenic Football Federation) Olympiacos |
| 11 | MF | Vahid Amiri | 2 April 1988 (aged 30) | 36 | 1 | (Football Federation Islamic Republic of Iran) Persepolis |
| 12 | GK | Mohammad Rashid Mazaheri | 18 May 1989 (aged 29) | 3 | 0 | (Football Federation Islamic Republic of Iran) Zob Ahan |
| 13 | DF | Mohammad Reza Khanzadeh | 11 May 1991 (aged 27) | 11 | 1 | (Football Federation Islamic Republic of Iran) Padideh |
| 14 | MF | Saman Ghoddos | 6 September 1993 (aged 24) | 8 | 1 | (Swedish Football Association) Östersund |
| 15 | DF | Pejman Montazeri | 6 September 1983 (aged 34) | 46 | 1 | (Football Federation Islamic Republic of Iran) Esteghlal |
| 16 | FW | Reza Ghoochannejhad | 20 September 1987 (aged 30) | 43 | 17 | (Royal Dutch Football Association) Heerenveen |
| 17 | FW | Mehdi Taremi | 18 July 1992 (aged 25) | 26 | 11 | (Qatar Football Association) Al-Gharafa |
| 18 | FW | Alireza Jahanbakhsh | 11 August 1993 (aged 24) | 38 | 4 | (Royal Dutch Football Association) AZ |
| 19 | DF | Majid Hosseini | 20 June 1996 (aged 21) | 1 | 0 | (Football Federation Islamic Republic of Iran) Esteghlal |
| 20 | FW | Sardar Azmoun | 1 January 1995 (aged 23) | 33 | 23 | (Russian Football Union) Rubin Kazan |
| 21 | MF | Ashkan Dejagah | 5 July 1986 (aged 31) | 46 | 9 | (The Football Association) Nottingham Forest |
| 22 | GK | Amir Abedzadeh | 26 April 1993 (aged 25) | 1 | 0 | (Portuguese Football Federation) Marítimo |
| 23 | DF | Ramin Rezaeian | 21 March 1990 (aged 28) | 28 | 2 | (Royal Belgian Football Association) Oostende |

=== Morocco ===
Coach: (France) Hervé Renard

Morocco's 26-man preliminary squad was announced on 17 May 2018. The final squad was announced on 4 June.

| No. | Pos. | Player | Date of birth (age) | Caps | Goals | Club |
|---|---|---|---|---|---|---|
| 1 | GK | Yassine Bounou | 5 April 1991 (aged 27) | 11 | 0 | (Royal Spanish Football Federation) Girona |
| 2 | DF | Achraf Hakimi | 4 November 1998 (aged 19) | 10 | 1 | (Royal Spanish Football Federation) Real Madrid |
| 3 | DF | Hamza Mendyl | 21 October 1997 (aged 20) | 13 | 0 | (French Football Federation) Lille |
| 4 | DF | Manuel da Costa | 6 May 1986 (aged 32) | 28 | 1 | (Turkish Football Federation) İstanbul Başakşehir |
| 5 | DF | Medhi Benatia (captain) | 17 April 1987 (aged 31) | 57 | 2 | (Italian Football Federation) Juventus |
| 6 | DF | Romain Saïss | 26 March 1990 (aged 28) | 24 | 1 | (The Football Association) Wolverhampton Wanderers |
| 7 | MF | Hakim Ziyech | 19 March 1993 (aged 25) | 18 | 9 | (Royal Dutch Football Association) Ajax |
| 8 | MF | Karim El Ahmadi | 27 January 1985 (aged 33) | 51 | 1 | (Royal Dutch Football Association) Feyenoord |
| 9 | FW | Ayoub El Kaabi | 25 June 1993 (aged 24) | 10 | 11 | (Royal Moroccan Football Federation) RS Berkane |
| 10 | MF | Younès Belhanda | 25 February 1990 (aged 28) | 47 | 5 | (Turkish Football Federation) Galatasaray |
| 11 | MF | Fayçal Fajr | 1 August 1988 (aged 29) | 23 | 2 | (Royal Spanish Football Federation) Getafe |
| 12 | GK | Munir Mohamedi | 10 May 1989 (aged 29) | 27 | 0 | (Royal Spanish Football Federation) Numancia |
| 13 | FW | Khalid Boutaïb | 24 April 1987 (aged 31) | 18 | 7 | (Turkish Football Federation) Yeni Malatyaspor |
| 14 | MF | Mbark Boussoufa | 15 August 1984 (aged 33) | 59 | 7 | (United Arab Emirates Football Association) Al Jazira |
| 15 | MF | Youssef Aït Bennasser | 7 July 1996 (aged 21) | 14 | 0 | (French Football Federation) Caen |
| 16 | MF | Nordin Amrabat | 31 March 1987 (aged 31) | 44 | 4 | (Royal Spanish Football Federation) Leganés |
| 17 | DF | Nabil Dirar | 25 February 1986 (aged 32) | 34 | 3 | (Turkish Football Federation) Fenerbahçe |
| 18 | MF | Amine Harit | 18 June 1997 (aged 20) | 6 | 0 | (German Football Association) Schalke 04 |
| 19 | FW | Youssef En-Nesyri | 1 June 1997 (aged 21) | 16 | 2 | (Royal Spanish Football Federation) Málaga |
| 20 | FW | Aziz Bouhaddouz | 30 March 1987 (aged 31) | 15 | 3 | (German Football Association) FC St. Pauli |
| 21 | MF | Sofyan Amrabat | 21 August 1996 (aged 21) | 6 | 0 | (Royal Dutch Football Association) Feyenoord |
| 22 | GK | Ahmed Reda Tagnaouti | 5 April 1996 (aged 22) | 2 | 0 | (Royal Moroccan Football Federation) IR Tanger |
| 23 | MF | Mehdi Carcela | 1 July 1989 (aged 28) | 20 | 1 | (Royal Belgian Football Association) Standard Liège |

=== Portugal ===
Coach: Fernando Santos

Portugal's 35-man preliminary squad was announced on 14 May 2018. The final squad was announced on 17 May.

| No. | Pos. | Player | Date of birth (age) | Caps | Goals | Club |
|---|---|---|---|---|---|---|
| 1 | GK | Rui Patrício | 15 February 1988 (aged 30) | 69 | 0 | (Portuguese Football Federation) Sporting CP |
| 2 | DF | Bruno Alves | 27 November 1981 (aged 36) | 96 | 11 | (Scottish Football Association) Rangers |
| 3 | DF | Pepe | 26 February 1983 (aged 35) | 95 | 5 | (Turkish Football Federation) Beşiktaş |
| 4 | MF | Manuel Fernandes | 5 February 1986 (aged 32) | 14 | 3 | (Russian Football Union) Lokomotiv Moscow |
| 5 | DF | Raphaël Guerreiro | 22 December 1993 (aged 24) | 24 | 2 | (German Football Association) Borussia Dortmund |
| 6 | DF | José Fonte | 22 December 1983 (aged 34) | 31 | 0 | (Chinese Football Association) Dalian Yifang |
| 7 | FW | Cristiano Ronaldo (captain) | 5 February 1985 (aged 33) | 150 | 81 | (Royal Spanish Football Federation) Real Madrid |
| 8 | MF | João Moutinho | 8 September 1986 (aged 31) | 110 | 7 | (French Football Federation) Monaco |
| 9 | FW | André Silva | 6 November 1995 (aged 22) | 23 | 12 | (Italian Football Federation) Milan |
| 10 | MF | João Mário | 19 January 1993 (aged 25) | 36 | 2 | (The Football Association) West Ham United |
| 11 | MF | Bernardo Silva | 10 August 1994 (aged 23) | 25 | 2 | (The Football Association) Manchester City |
| 12 | GK | Anthony Lopes | 1 October 1990 (aged 27) | 7 | 0 | (French Football Federation) Lyon |
| 13 | DF | Rúben Dias | 14 May 1997 (aged 21) | 1 | 0 | (Portuguese Football Federation) Benfica |
| 14 | MF | William Carvalho | 7 April 1992 (aged 26) | 43 | 2 | (Portuguese Football Federation) Sporting CP |
| 15 | DF | Ricardo Pereira | 6 October 1993 (aged 24) | 4 | 0 | (Portuguese Football Federation) Porto |
| 16 | MF | Bruno Fernandes | 8 September 1994 (aged 23) | 6 | 1 | (Portuguese Football Federation) Sporting CP |
| 17 | FW | Gonçalo Guedes | 29 November 1996 (aged 21) | 10 | 3 | (Royal Spanish Football Federation) Valencia |
| 18 | FW | Gelson Martins | 11 May 1995 (aged 23) | 18 | 0 | (Portuguese Football Federation) Sporting CP |
| 19 | DF | Mário Rui | 27 May 1991 (aged 27) | 4 | 0 | (Italian Football Federation) Napoli |
| 20 | FW | Ricardo Quaresma | 26 September 1983 (aged 34) | 77 | 9 | (Turkish Football Federation) Beşiktaş |
| 21 | DF | Cédric | 31 August 1991 (aged 26) | 29 | 1 | (The Football Association) Southampton |
| 22 | GK | Beto | 1 May 1982 (aged 36) | 14 | 0 | (Turkish Football Federation) Göztepe |
| 23 | MF | Adrien Silva | 15 March 1989 (aged 29) | 23 | 1 | (The Football Association) Leicester City |

=== Spain ===
Coach: Fernando Hierro

Spain's final squad was announced on 21 May 2018. Coach Julen Lopetegui was sacked and replaced by Fernando Hierro on 13 June.

| No. | Pos. | Player | Date of birth (age) | Caps | Goals | Club |
|---|---|---|---|---|---|---|
| 1 | GK | David de Gea | 7 November 1990 (aged 27) | 29 | 0 | (The Football Association) Manchester United |
| 2 | DF | Dani Carvajal | 11 January 1992 (aged 26) | 15 | 0 | (Royal Spanish Football Federation) Real Madrid |
| 3 | DF | Gerard Piqué | 2 February 1987 (aged 31) | 98 | 5 | (Royal Spanish Football Federation) Barcelona |
| 4 | DF | Nacho | 18 January 1990 (aged 28) | 17 | 0 | (Royal Spanish Football Federation) Real Madrid |
| 5 | MF | Sergio Busquets | 16 July 1988 (aged 29) | 103 | 2 | (Royal Spanish Football Federation) Barcelona |
| 6 | MF | Andrés Iniesta | 11 May 1984 (aged 34) | 127 | 14 | (Royal Spanish Football Federation) Barcelona |
| 7 | MF | Saúl | 21 November 1994 (aged 23) | 10 | 0 | (Royal Spanish Football Federation) Atlético Madrid |
| 8 | MF | Koke | 8 January 1992 (aged 26) | 40 | 0 | (Royal Spanish Football Federation) Atlético Madrid |
| 9 | FW | Rodrigo | 6 March 1991 (aged 27) | 6 | 2 | (Royal Spanish Football Federation) Valencia |
| 10 | MF | Thiago | 11 April 1991 (aged 27) | 29 | 2 | (German Football Association) Bayern Munich |
| 11 | FW | Lucas Vázquez | 1 July 1991 (aged 26) | 7 | 0 | (Royal Spanish Football Federation) Real Madrid |
| 12 | DF | Álvaro Odriozola | 14 December 1995 (aged 22) | 4 | 1 | (Royal Spanish Football Federation) Real Sociedad |
| 13 | GK | Kepa Arrizabalaga | 3 October 1994 (aged 23) | 1 | 0 | (Royal Spanish Football Federation) Athletic Bilbao |
| 14 | DF | César Azpilicueta | 28 August 1989 (aged 28) | 22 | 0 | (The Football Association) Chelsea |
| 15 | DF | Sergio Ramos (captain) | 30 March 1986 (aged 32) | 152 | 13 | (Royal Spanish Football Federation) Real Madrid |
| 16 | DF | Nacho Monreal | 26 February 1986 (aged 32) | 22 | 1 | (The Football Association) Arsenal |
| 17 | FW | Iago Aspas | 1 August 1987 (aged 30) | 10 | 5 | (Royal Spanish Football Federation) Celta Vigo |
| 18 | DF | Jordi Alba | 21 March 1989 (aged 29) | 62 | 8 | (Royal Spanish Football Federation) Barcelona |
| 19 | FW | Diego Costa | 7 October 1988 (aged 29) | 20 | 7 | (Royal Spanish Football Federation) Atlético Madrid |
| 20 | MF | Marco Asensio | 21 January 1996 (aged 22) | 12 | 0 | (Royal Spanish Football Federation) Real Madrid |
| 21 | FW | David Silva | 8 January 1986 (aged 32) | 121 | 35 | (The Football Association) Manchester City |
| 22 | MF | Isco | 21 April 1992 (aged 26) | 28 | 10 | (Royal Spanish Football Federation) Real Madrid |
| 23 | GK | Pepe Reina | 31 August 1982 (aged 35) | 36 | 0 | (Italian Football Federation) Napoli |

== Group C ==
=== Australia ===
Coach: (Netherlands) Bert van Marwijk

Australia's 32-man preliminary squad was announced on 6 May 2018. The squad was reduced to 26 players on 14 May, then extended to 27 players on 28 May. The final squad was announced on 3 June.

| No. | Pos. | Player | Date of birth (age) | Caps | Goals | Club |
|---|---|---|---|---|---|---|
| 1 | GK | Mathew Ryan | 8 April 1992 (aged 26) | 44 | 0 | (The Football Association) Brighton & Hove Albion |
| 2 | DF | Miloš Degenek | 28 April 1994 (aged 24) | 18 | 0 | (Japan Football Association) Yokohama F. Marinos |
| 3 | DF | James Meredith | 5 April 1988 (aged 30) | 2 | 0 | (The Football Association) Millwall |
| 4 | FW | Tim Cahill | 6 December 1979 (aged 38) | 106 | 50 | (The Football Association) Millwall |
| 5 | DF | Mark Milligan | 4 August 1985 (aged 32) | 71 | 6 | (Saudi Arabian Football Federation) Al Ahli |
| 6 | DF | Matthew Jurman | 8 December 1989 (aged 28) | 4 | 0 | (Korea Football Association) Suwon Samsung Bluewings |
| 7 | FW | Mathew Leckie | 4 February 1991 (aged 27) | 53 | 8 | (German Football Association) Hertha BSC |
| 8 | MF | Massimo Luongo | 25 September 1992 (aged 25) | 36 | 5 | (The Football Association) Queens Park Rangers |
| 9 | FW | Tomi Juric | 22 July 1991 (aged 26) | 35 | 8 | (Swiss Football Association) Luzern |
| 10 | FW | Robbie Kruse | 5 October 1988 (aged 29) | 64 | 5 | (German Football Association) VfL Bochum |
| 11 | FW | Andrew Nabbout | 17 December 1992 (aged 25) | 4 | 1 | (Japan Football Association) Urawa Red Diamonds |
| 12 | GK | Brad Jones | 19 March 1982 (aged 36) | 6 | 0 | (Royal Dutch Football Association) Feyenoord |
| 13 | MF | Aaron Mooy | 15 September 1990 (aged 27) | 34 | 5 | (The Football Association) Huddersfield Town |
| 14 | FW | Jamie Maclaren | 29 July 1993 (aged 24) | 6 | 0 | (Scottish Football Association) Hibernian |
| 15 | MF | Mile Jedinak (captain) | 3 August 1984 (aged 33) | 76 | 18 | (The Football Association) Aston Villa |
| 16 | DF | Aziz Behich | 16 December 1990 (aged 27) | 23 | 2 | (Turkish Football Federation) Bursaspor |
| 17 | FW | Daniel Arzani | 4 January 1999 (aged 19) | 2 | 1 | (Football Australia) Melbourne City |
| 18 | GK | Danny Vukovic | 27 March 1985 (aged 33) | 1 | 0 | (Royal Belgian Football Association) Genk |
| 19 | DF | Josh Risdon | 27 July 1992 (aged 25) | 8 | 0 | (Football Australia) Western Sydney Wanderers |
| 20 | DF | Trent Sainsbury | 5 January 1992 (aged 26) | 35 | 3 | (Swiss Football Association) Grasshopper |
| 21 | FW | Dimitri Petratos | 10 November 1992 (aged 25) | 2 | 0 | (Football Australia) Newcastle Jets |
| 22 | MF | Jackson Irvine | 7 March 1993 (aged 25) | 19 | 2 | (The Football Association) Hull City |
| 23 | MF | Tom Rogic | 16 December 1992 (aged 25) | 37 | 7 | (Scottish Football Association) Celtic |

=== Denmark ===
Coach: (Norway) Åge Hareide

Denmark's 35-man preliminary squad was announced on 14 May 2018. The squad was reduced to 27 players on 27 May. The final squad was announced on 3 June.

| No. | Pos. | Player | Date of birth (age) | Caps | Goals | Club |
|---|---|---|---|---|---|---|
| 1 | GK | Kasper Schmeichel | 5 November 1986 (aged 31) | 35 | 0 | (The Football Association) Leicester City |
| 2 | MF | Michael Krohn-Dehli | 6 June 1983 (aged 35) | 59 | 6 | (Royal Spanish Football Federation) Deportivo La Coruña |
| 3 | DF | Jannik Vestergaard | 3 August 1992 (aged 25) | 16 | 1 | (German Football Association) Borussia Mönchengladbach |
| 4 | DF | Simon Kjær (captain) | 26 March 1989 (aged 29) | 78 | 3 | (Royal Spanish Football Federation) Sevilla |
| 5 | DF | Jonas Knudsen | 16 September 1992 (aged 25) | 3 | 0 | (The Football Association) Ipswich Town |
| 6 | DF | Andreas Christensen | 10 April 1996 (aged 22) | 16 | 1 | (The Football Association) Chelsea |
| 7 | MF | William Kvist | 24 February 1985 (aged 33) | 80 | 2 | (Danish Football Association) Copenhagen |
| 8 | MF | Thomas Delaney | 3 September 1991 (aged 26) | 27 | 4 | (German Football Association) Werder Bremen |
| 9 | FW | Nicolai Jørgensen | 15 January 1991 (aged 27) | 31 | 8 | (Royal Dutch Football Association) Feyenoord |
| 10 | MF | Christian Eriksen | 14 February 1992 (aged 26) | 78 | 22 | (The Football Association) Tottenham Hotspur |
| 11 | FW | Martin Braithwaite | 5 June 1991 (aged 27) | 20 | 1 | (French Football Federation) Bordeaux |
| 12 | FW | Kasper Dolberg | 6 October 1997 (aged 20) | 6 | 1 | (Royal Dutch Football Association) Ajax |
| 13 | DF | Mathias Jørgensen | 23 April 1990 (aged 28) | 12 | 0 | (The Football Association) Huddersfield Town |
| 14 | DF | Henrik Dalsgaard | 27 July 1989 (aged 28) | 11 | 0 | (The Football Association) Brentford |
| 15 | FW | Viktor Fischer | 9 June 1994 (aged 24) | 19 | 3 | (Danish Football Association) Copenhagen |
| 16 | GK | Jonas Lössl | 1 February 1989 (aged 29) | 1 | 0 | (The Football Association) Huddersfield Town |
| 17 | DF | Jens Stryger Larsen | 21 February 1991 (aged 27) | 13 | 1 | (Italian Football Federation) Udinese |
| 18 | MF | Lukas Lerager | 12 July 1993 (aged 24) | 4 | 0 | (French Football Federation) Bordeaux |
| 19 | MF | Lasse Schöne | 27 May 1986 (aged 32) | 36 | 3 | (Royal Dutch Football Association) Ajax |
| 20 | FW | Yussuf Poulsen | 15 June 1994 (aged 23) | 28 | 4 | (German Football Association) RB Leipzig |
| 21 | FW | Andreas Cornelius | 16 March 1993 (aged 25) | 18 | 4 | (Italian Football Federation) Atalanta |
| 22 | GK | Frederik Rønnow | 4 August 1992 (aged 25) | 6 | 0 | (Danish Football Association) Brøndby |
| 23 | FW | Pione Sisto | 4 February 1995 (aged 23) | 14 | 1 | (Royal Spanish Football Federation) Celta Vigo |

=== France ===
Coach: Didier Deschamps

France's final squad was announced on 17 May 2018.

| No. | Pos. | Player | Date of birth (age) | Caps | Goals | Club |
|---|---|---|---|---|---|---|
| 1 | GK | Hugo Lloris (captain) | 26 December 1986 (aged 31) | 98 | 0 | (The Football Association) Tottenham Hotspur |
| 2 | DF | Benjamin Pavard | 28 March 1996 (aged 22) | 6 | 0 | (German Football Association) VfB Stuttgart |
| 3 | DF | Presnel Kimpembe | 13 August 1995 (aged 22) | 2 | 0 | (French Football Federation) Paris Saint-Germain |
| 4 | DF | Raphaël Varane | 25 April 1993 (aged 25) | 42 | 2 | (Royal Spanish Football Federation) Real Madrid |
| 5 | DF | Samuel Umtiti | 14 November 1993 (aged 24) | 19 | 2 | (Royal Spanish Football Federation) Barcelona |
| 6 | MF | Paul Pogba | 15 March 1993 (aged 25) | 54 | 9 | (The Football Association) Manchester United |
| 7 | FW | Antoine Griezmann | 21 March 1991 (aged 27) | 54 | 20 | (Royal Spanish Football Federation) Atlético Madrid |
| 8 | FW | Thomas Lemar | 12 November 1995 (aged 22) | 12 | 3 | (French Football Federation) Monaco |
| 9 | FW | Olivier Giroud | 30 September 1986 (aged 31) | 74 | 31 | (The Football Association) Chelsea |
| 10 | FW | Kylian Mbappé | 20 December 1998 (aged 19) | 15 | 4 | (French Football Federation) Paris Saint-Germain |
| 11 | FW | Ousmane Dembélé | 15 May 1997 (aged 21) | 12 | 2 | (Royal Spanish Football Federation) Barcelona |
| 12 | MF | Corentin Tolisso | 3 August 1994 (aged 23) | 9 | 0 | (German Football Association) Bayern Munich |
| 13 | MF | N'Golo Kanté | 29 March 1991 (aged 27) | 24 | 1 | (The Football Association) Chelsea |
| 14 | MF | Blaise Matuidi | 9 April 1987 (aged 31) | 67 | 9 | (Italian Football Federation) Juventus |
| 15 | MF | Steven Nzonzi | 15 December 1988 (aged 29) | 4 | 0 | (Royal Spanish Football Federation) Sevilla |
| 16 | GK | Steve Mandanda | 28 March 1985 (aged 33) | 27 | 0 | (French Football Federation) Marseille |
| 17 | DF | Adil Rami | 27 December 1985 (aged 32) | 35 | 1 | (French Football Federation) Marseille |
| 18 | FW | Nabil Fekir | 18 July 1993 (aged 24) | 12 | 2 | (French Football Federation) Lyon |
| 19 | DF | Djibril Sidibé | 29 July 1992 (aged 25) | 17 | 1 | (French Football Federation) Monaco |
| 20 | FW | Florian Thauvin | 26 January 1993 (aged 25) | 4 | 0 | (French Football Federation) Marseille |
| 21 | DF | Lucas Hernandez | 14 February 1996 (aged 22) | 5 | 0 | (Royal Spanish Football Federation) Atlético Madrid |
| 22 | DF | Benjamin Mendy | 17 July 1994 (aged 23) | 7 | 0 | (The Football Association) Manchester City |
| 23 | GK | Alphonse Areola | 27 February 1993 (aged 25) | 0 | 0 | (French Football Federation) Paris Saint-Germain |

=== Peru ===
Coach: (Argentina) Ricardo Gareca

Peru's 24-man preliminary squad was announced on 16 May 2018. The final squad was initially announced on 30 May, but was extended to 24 players on 31 May after the suspension of Paolo Guerrero was lifted. The final squad was announced on 4 June.

| No. | Pos. | Player | Date of birth (age) | Caps | Goals | Club |
|---|---|---|---|---|---|---|
| 1 | GK | Pedro Gallese | 23 February 1990 (aged 28) | 38 | 0 | (Mexican Football Federation) Veracruz |
| 2 | DF | Alberto Rodríguez | 31 March 1984 (aged 34) | 74 | 0 | (Colombian Football Federation) Atlético Junior |
| 3 | DF | Aldo Corzo | 20 May 1989 (aged 29) | 26 | 0 | (Peruvian Football Federation) Universitario |
| 4 | DF | Anderson Santamaría | 10 January 1992 (aged 26) | 4 | 0 | (Mexican Football Federation) Puebla |
| 5 | DF | Miguel Araujo | 24 October 1994 (aged 23) | 8 | 0 | (Peruvian Football Federation) Alianza Lima |
| 6 | DF | Miguel Trauco | 25 August 1992 (aged 25) | 27 | 0 | (Brazilian Football Confederation) Flamengo |
| 7 | MF | Paolo Hurtado | 27 July 1990 (aged 27) | 33 | 3 | (Portuguese Football Federation) Vitória de Guimarães |
| 8 | MF | Christian Cueva | 23 November 1991 (aged 26) | 46 | 8 | (Brazilian Football Confederation) São Paulo |
| 9 | FW | Paolo Guerrero (captain) | 1 January 1984 (aged 34) | 88 | 34 | (Brazilian Football Confederation) Flamengo |
| 10 | FW | Jefferson Farfán | 26 October 1984 (aged 33) | 84 | 25 | (Russian Football Union) Lokomotiv Moscow |
| 11 | FW | Raúl Ruidíaz | 25 July 1990 (aged 27) | 30 | 4 | (Mexican Football Federation) Morelia |
| 12 | GK | Carlos Cáceda | 27 September 1991 (aged 26) | 6 | 0 | (Peruvian Football Federation) Deportivo Municipal |
| 13 | MF | Renato Tapia | 28 July 1995 (aged 22) | 33 | 3 | (Royal Dutch Football Association) Feyenoord |
| 14 | MF | Andy Polo | 29 September 1994 (aged 23) | 17 | 1 | (United States Soccer Federation) Portland Timbers |
| 15 | DF | Christian Ramos | 4 November 1988 (aged 29) | 68 | 3 | (Mexican Football Federation) Veracruz |
| 16 | MF | Wilder Cartagena | 23 September 1994 (aged 23) | 3 | 0 | (Mexican Football Federation) Veracruz |
| 17 | DF | Luis Advíncula | 2 March 1990 (aged 28) | 67 | 0 | (Mexican Football Federation) Lobos BUAP |
| 18 | FW | André Carrillo | 14 June 1991 (aged 27) | 46 | 5 | (The Football Association) Watford |
| 19 | MF | Yoshimar Yotún | 7 April 1990 (aged 28) | 74 | 2 | (United States Soccer Federation) Orlando City SC |
| 20 | FW | Edison Flores | 14 May 1994 (aged 24) | 30 | 9 | (Danish Football Association) AaB |
| 21 | GK | José Carvallo | 1 March 1986 (aged 32) | 6 | 0 | (Peruvian Football Federation) UTC |
| 22 | DF | Nilson Loyola | 26 October 1994 (aged 23) | 3 | 0 | (Peruvian Football Federation) Melgar |
| 23 | MF | Pedro Aquino | 13 April 1995 (aged 23) | 14 | 0 | (Mexican Football Federation) Lobos BUAP |

== Group D ==
=== Argentina ===
Coach: Jorge Sampaoli

Argentina's 35-man preliminary squad was announced on 14 May 2018. The final squad was announced on 21 May. Sergio Romero withdrew injured and was replaced by Nahuel Guzmán on 23 May. Manuel Lanzini withdrew injured and was replaced by Enzo Pérez on 9 June.

| No. | Pos. | Player | Date of birth (age) | Caps | Goals | Club |
|---|---|---|---|---|---|---|
| 1 | GK | Nahuel Guzmán | 10 February 1986 (aged 32) | 6 | 0 | (Mexican Football Federation) Tigres UANL |
| 2 | DF | Gabriel Mercado | 18 March 1987 (aged 31) | 20 | 3 | (Royal Spanish Football Federation) Sevilla |
| 3 | DF | Nicolás Tagliafico | 31 August 1992 (aged 25) | 4 | 0 | (Royal Dutch Football Association) Ajax |
| 4 | DF | Cristian Ansaldi | 20 September 1986 (aged 31) | 5 | 0 | (Italian Football Federation) Torino |
| 5 | MF | Lucas Biglia | 30 January 1986 (aged 32) | 57 | 1 | (Italian Football Federation) Milan |
| 6 | DF | Federico Fazio | 17 March 1987 (aged 31) | 9 | 1 | (Italian Football Federation) Roma |
| 7 | MF | Éver Banega | 29 June 1988 (aged 29) | 62 | 6 | (Royal Spanish Football Federation) Sevilla |
| 8 | DF | Marcos Acuña | 28 October 1991 (aged 26) | 10 | 0 | (Portuguese Football Federation) Sporting CP |
| 9 | FW | Gonzalo Higuaín | 10 December 1987 (aged 30) | 71 | 31 | (Italian Football Federation) Juventus |
| 10 | FW | Lionel Messi (captain) | 24 June 1987 (aged 30) | 124 | 64 | (Royal Spanish Football Federation) Barcelona |
| 11 | MF | Ángel Di María | 14 February 1988 (aged 30) | 94 | 19 | (French Football Federation) Paris Saint-Germain |
| 12 | GK | Franco Armani | 16 October 1986 (aged 31) | 0 | 0 | (Argentine Football Association) River Plate |
| 13 | MF | Maximiliano Meza | 15 December 1992 (aged 25) | 2 | 0 | (Argentine Football Association) Independiente |
| 14 | DF | Javier Mascherano | 8 June 1984 (aged 34) | 143 | 3 | (Chinese Football Association) Hebei China Fortune |
| 15 | MF | Enzo Pérez | 22 February 1986 (aged 32) | 23 | 1 | (Argentine Football Association) River Plate |
| 16 | DF | Marcos Rojo | 20 March 1990 (aged 28) | 56 | 2 | (The Football Association) Manchester United |
| 17 | DF | Nicolás Otamendi | 12 February 1988 (aged 30) | 54 | 4 | (The Football Association) Manchester City |
| 18 | FW | Eduardo Salvio | 13 July 1990 (aged 27) | 9 | 0 | (Portuguese Football Federation) Benfica |
| 19 | FW | Sergio Agüero | 2 June 1988 (aged 30) | 85 | 37 | (The Football Association) Manchester City |
| 20 | MF | Giovani Lo Celso | 9 April 1996 (aged 22) | 5 | 0 | (French Football Federation) Paris Saint-Germain |
| 21 | FW | Paulo Dybala | 15 November 1993 (aged 24) | 12 | 0 | (Italian Football Federation) Juventus |
| 22 | MF | Cristian Pavón | 21 January 1996 (aged 22) | 5 | 0 | (Argentine Football Association) Boca Juniors |
| 23 | GK | Willy Caballero | 28 September 1981 (aged 36) | 3 | 0 | (The Football Association) Chelsea |

=== Croatia ===
Coach: Zlatko Dalić

Croatia's 32-man preliminary squad was announced on 14 May 2018. The squad was reduced to 24 players on 21 May. The final squad was announced on 4 June.

| No. | Pos. | Player | Date of birth (age) | Caps | Goals | Club |
|---|---|---|---|---|---|---|
| 1 | GK | Dominik Livaković | 9 January 1995 (aged 23) | 1 | 0 | (Croatian Football Federation) Dinamo Zagreb |
| 2 | DF | Šime Vrsaljko | 10 January 1992 (aged 26) | 35 | 0 | (Royal Spanish Football Federation) Atlético Madrid |
| 3 | DF | Ivan Strinić | 17 July 1987 (aged 30) | 43 | 0 | (Italian Football Federation) Sampdoria |
| 4 | FW | Ivan Perišić | 2 February 1989 (aged 29) | 66 | 18 | (Italian Football Federation) Inter Milan |
| 5 | DF | Vedran Ćorluka | 5 February 1986 (aged 32) | 99 | 4 | (Russian Football Union) Lokomotiv Moscow |
| 6 | DF | Dejan Lovren | 5 July 1989 (aged 28) | 39 | 2 | (The Football Association) Liverpool |
| 7 | MF | Ivan Rakitić | 10 March 1988 (aged 30) | 92 | 14 | (Royal Spanish Football Federation) Barcelona |
| 8 | MF | Mateo Kovačić | 6 May 1994 (aged 24) | 41 | 1 | (Royal Spanish Football Federation) Real Madrid |
| 9 | FW | Andrej Kramarić | 19 June 1991 (aged 26) | 31 | 9 | (German Football Association) TSG Hoffenheim |
| 10 | MF | Luka Modrić (captain) | 9 September 1985 (aged 32) | 106 | 12 | (Royal Spanish Football Federation) Real Madrid |
| 11 | MF | Marcelo Brozović | 16 November 1992 (aged 25) | 35 | 6 | (Italian Football Federation) Inter Milan |
| 12 | GK | Lovre Kalinić | 3 April 1990 (aged 28) | 11 | 0 | (Royal Belgian Football Association) Gent |
| 13 | DF | Tin Jedvaj | 28 November 1995 (aged 22) | 12 | 0 | (German Football Association) Bayer Leverkusen |
| 14 | MF | Filip Bradarić | 11 January 1992 (aged 26) | 4 | 0 | (Croatian Football Federation) Rijeka |
| 15 | DF | Duje Ćaleta-Car | 17 September 1996 (aged 21) | 1 | 0 | (Austrian Football Association) Red Bull Salzburg |
| 16 | FW | Nikola Kalinić (Note: Nikola Kalinić was removed from the squad on 17 June 2018 after refusing to come on as a substitute during the opening match against Nigeria on 16 June.) | 5 January 1988 (aged 30) | 42 | 15 | (Italian Football Federation) Milan |
| 17 | FW | Mario Mandžukić | 21 May 1986 (aged 32) | 83 | 30 | (Italian Football Federation) Juventus |
| 18 | FW | Ante Rebić | 21 September 1993 (aged 24) | 16 | 1 | (German Football Association) Eintracht Frankfurt |
| 19 | MF | Milan Badelj | 25 February 1989 (aged 29) | 38 | 1 | (Italian Football Federation) Fiorentina |
| 20 | FW | Marko Pjaca | 6 May 1995 (aged 23) | 16 | 1 | (German Football Association) Schalke 04 |
| 21 | DF | Domagoj Vida | 29 April 1989 (aged 29) | 59 | 2 | (Turkish Football Federation) Beşiktaş |
| 22 | DF | Josip Pivarić | 30 January 1989 (aged 29) | 19 | 0 | (Ukrainian Association of Football) Dynamo Kyiv |
| 23 | GK | Danijel Subašić | 27 October 1984 (aged 33) | 38 | 0 | (French Football Federation) Monaco |

=== Iceland ===
Coach: Heimir Hallgrímsson

Iceland's final squad was announced on 11 May 2018.

| No. | Pos. | Player | Date of birth (age) | Caps | Goals | Club |
|---|---|---|---|---|---|---|
| 1 | GK | Hannes Þór Halldórsson | 27 April 1984 (aged 34) | 49 | 0 | (Danish Football Association) Randers |
| 2 | DF | Birkir Már Sævarsson | 11 November 1984 (aged 33) | 79 | 1 | (Football Association of Iceland) Valur |
| 3 | MF | Samúel Friðjónsson | 22 February 1996 (aged 22) | 4 | 0 | (Norwegian Football Federation) Vålerenga |
| 4 | MF | Albert Guðmundsson | 15 June 1997 (aged 20) | 5 | 3 | (Royal Dutch Football Association) PSV Eindhoven |
| 5 | DF | Sverrir Ingi Ingason | 5 August 1993 (aged 24) | 20 | 3 | (Russian Football Union) Rostov |
| 6 | DF | Ragnar Sigurðsson | 19 June 1986 (aged 31) | 77 | 3 | (Russian Football Union) Rostov |
| 7 | MF | Jóhann Berg Guðmundsson | 27 October 1990 (aged 27) | 67 | 7 | (The Football Association) Burnley |
| 8 | MF | Birkir Bjarnason | 27 May 1988 (aged 30) | 67 | 9 | (The Football Association) Aston Villa |
| 9 | FW | Björn Bergmann Sigurðarson | 26 February 1991 (aged 27) | 12 | 1 | (Russian Football Union) Rostov |
| 10 | MF | Gylfi Sigurðsson | 8 September 1989 (aged 28) | 57 | 19 | (The Football Association) Everton |
| 11 | FW | Alfreð Finnbogason | 1 February 1989 (aged 29) | 47 | 13 | (German Football Association) FC Augsburg |
| 12 | GK | Frederik Schram | 19 January 1995 (aged 23) | 4 | 0 | (Danish Football Association) Roskilde |
| 13 | GK | Rúnar Alex Rúnarsson | 18 February 1995 (aged 23) | 3 | 0 | (Danish Football Association) Nordsjælland |
| 14 | DF | Kári Árnason | 13 October 1982 (aged 35) | 67 | 5 | (Scottish Football Association) Aberdeen |
| 15 | DF | Hólmar Örn Eyjólfsson | 6 August 1990 (aged 27) | 10 | 1 | (Bulgarian Football Union) Levski Sofia |
| 16 | MF | Ólafur Ingi Skúlason | 1 April 1983 (aged 35) | 36 | 1 | (Turkish Football Federation) Kardemir Karabükspor |
| 17 | MF | Aron Gunnarsson (captain) | 22 April 1989 (aged 29) | 77 | 2 | (Football Association of Wales) Cardiff City |
| 18 | DF | Hörður Björgvin Magnússon | 11 February 1993 (aged 25) | 16 | 2 | (The Football Association) Bristol City |
| 19 | MF | Rúrik Gíslason | 25 February 1988 (aged 30) | 47 | 3 | (German Football Association) SV Sandhausen |
| 20 | MF | Emil Hallfreðsson | 29 June 1984 (aged 33) | 64 | 1 | (Italian Football Federation) Udinese |
| 21 | MF | Arnór Ingvi Traustason | 30 April 1993 (aged 25) | 19 | 5 | (Swedish Football Association) Malmö FF |
| 22 | FW | Jón Daði Böðvarsson | 25 May 1992 (aged 26) | 38 | 2 | (The Football Association) Reading |
| 23 | DF | Ari Freyr Skúlason | 14 May 1987 (aged 31) | 56 | 0 | (Royal Belgian Football Association) Lokeren |

=== Nigeria ===
Coach: (Germany) Gernot Rohr

Nigeria's 30-man preliminary squad was announced on 14 May 2018. The squad was reduced to 29 players on 27 May as Moses Simon withdrew injured, then to 25 players on 30 May. The final squad was announced on 3 June.

| No. | Pos. | Player | Date of birth (age) | Caps | Goals | Club |
|---|---|---|---|---|---|---|
| 1 | GK | Ikechukwu Ezenwa | 16 October 1988 (aged 29) | 24 | 0 | (Nigeria Football Federation) Enyimba |
| 2 | DF | Brian Idowu | 18 May 1992 (aged 26) | 5 | 1 | (Russian Football Union) Amkar Perm |
| 3 | DF | Elderson Echiéjilé | 20 January 1988 (aged 30) | 62 | 3 | (Royal Belgian Football Association) Cercle Brugge |
| 4 | MF | Wilfred Ndidi | 16 December 1996 (aged 21) | 17 | 0 | (The Football Association) Leicester City |
| 5 | DF | William Troost-Ekong | 1 September 1993 (aged 24) | 22 | 1 | (Turkish Football Federation) Bursaspor |
| 6 | DF | Leon Balogun | 28 June 1988 (aged 29) | 19 | 0 | (German Football Association) Mainz 05 |
| 7 | FW | Ahmed Musa | 14 October 1992 (aged 25) | 72 | 13 | (Russian Football Union) CSKA Moscow |
| 8 | MF | Peter Etebo | 9 November 1995 (aged 22) | 14 | 1 | (Royal Spanish Football Federation) Las Palmas |
| 9 | FW | Odion Ighalo | 16 June 1989 (aged 28) | 19 | 4 | (Chinese Football Association) Changchun Yatai |
| 10 | MF | John Obi Mikel (captain) | 22 April 1987 (aged 31) | 85 | 6 | (Chinese Football Association) Tianjin TEDA |
| 11 | FW | Victor Moses | 12 December 1990 (aged 27) | 34 | 11 | (The Football Association) Chelsea |
| 12 | DF | Shehu Abdullahi | 12 March 1993 (aged 25) | 25 | 0 | (Turkish Football Federation) Bursaspor |
| 13 | FW | Simy | 7 May 1992 (aged 26) | 2 | 0 | (Italian Football Federation) Crotone |
| 14 | FW | Kelechi Iheanacho | 10 March 1996 (aged 22) | 18 | 8 | (The Football Association) Leicester City |
| 15 | MF | Joel Obi | 22 May 1991 (aged 27) | 17 | 0 | (Italian Football Federation) Torino |
| 16 | GK | Daniel Akpeyi | 8 March 1986 (aged 32) | 7 | 0 | (South African Football Association) Chippa United |
| 17 | MF | Ogenyi Onazi | 25 December 1992 (aged 25) | 52 | 1 | (Turkish Football Federation) Trabzonspor |
| 18 | FW | Alex Iwobi | 3 May 1996 (aged 22) | 19 | 5 | (The Football Association) Arsenal |
| 19 | MF | John Ogu | 20 April 1988 (aged 30) | 20 | 2 | (Israel Football Association) Hapoel Be'er Sheva |
| 20 | DF | Chidozie Awaziem | 1 January 1997 (aged 21) | 4 | 0 | (French Football Federation) Nantes |
| 21 | DF | Tyronne Ebuehi | 16 December 1995 (aged 22) | 7 | 0 | (Royal Dutch Football Association) ADO Den Haag |
| 22 | DF | Kenneth Omeruo | 17 October 1993 (aged 24) | 39 | 0 | (Turkish Football Federation) Kasımpaşa |
| 23 | GK | Francis Uzoho | 28 October 1998 (aged 19) | 6 | 0 | (Royal Spanish Football Federation) Deportivo La Coruña |

== Group E ==
=== Brazil ===
Coach: Tite

Brazil's final squad was announced on 14 May 2018.

| No. | Pos. | Player | Date of birth (age) | Caps | Goals | Club |
|---|---|---|---|---|---|---|
| 1 | GK | Alisson Becker | 2 October 1992 (aged 25) | 26 | 0 | (Italian Football Federation) Roma |
| 2 | DF | Thiago Silva (captain) | 22 September 1984 (aged 33) | 71 | 5 | (French Football Federation) Paris Saint-Germain |
| 3 | DF | Miranda | 7 September 1984 (aged 33) | 47 | 2 | (Italian Football Federation) Inter Milan |
| 4 | DF | Pedro Geromel | 21 September 1985 (aged 32) | 2 | 0 | (Brazilian Football Confederation) Grêmio |
| 5 | MF | Casemiro | 23 February 1992 (aged 26) | 24 | 0 | (Royal Spanish Football Federation) Real Madrid |
| 6 | DF | Filipe Luís | 9 August 1985 (aged 32) | 33 | 2 | (Royal Spanish Football Federation) Atlético Madrid |
| 7 | FW | Douglas Costa | 14 September 1990 (aged 27) | 25 | 3 | (Italian Football Federation) Juventus |
| 8 | MF | Renato Augusto | 8 February 1988 (aged 30) | 28 | 5 | (Chinese Football Association) Beijing Sinobo Guoan |
| 9 | FW | Gabriel Jesus | 3 April 1997 (aged 21) | 17 | 10 | (The Football Association) Manchester City |
| 10 | FW | Neymar | 5 February 1992 (aged 26) | 85 | 55 | (French Football Federation) Paris Saint-Germain |
| 11 | MF | Philippe Coutinho | 12 June 1992 (aged 26) | 37 | 10 | (Royal Spanish Football Federation) Barcelona |
| 12 | DF | Marcelo | 12 May 1988 (aged 30) | 54 | 6 | (Royal Spanish Football Federation) Real Madrid |
| 13 | DF | Marquinhos | 14 May 1994 (aged 24) | 26 | 0 | (French Football Federation) Paris Saint-Germain |
| 14 | DF | Danilo | 15 July 1991 (aged 26) | 18 | 0 | (The Football Association) Manchester City |
| 15 | MF | Paulinho | 25 July 1988 (aged 29) | 50 | 12 | (Royal Spanish Football Federation) Barcelona |
| 16 | GK | Cássio | 6 June 1987 (aged 31) | 1 | 0 | (Brazilian Football Confederation) Corinthians |
| 17 | MF | Fernandinho | 4 May 1985 (aged 33) | 44 | 2 | (The Football Association) Manchester City |
| 18 | MF | Fred | 5 March 1993 (aged 25) | 8 | 0 | (Ukrainian Association of Football) Shakhtar Donetsk |
| 19 | MF | Willian | 9 August 1988 (aged 29) | 57 | 8 | (The Football Association) Chelsea |
| 20 | FW | Roberto Firmino | 2 October 1991 (aged 26) | 21 | 7 | (The Football Association) Liverpool |
| 21 | FW | Taison | 13 January 1988 (aged 30) | 8 | 1 | (Ukrainian Association of Football) Shakhtar Donetsk |
| 22 | DF | Fagner | 11 June 1989 (aged 29) | 4 | 0 | (Brazilian Football Confederation) Corinthians |
| 23 | GK | Ederson | 17 August 1993 (aged 24) | 1 | 0 | (The Football Association) Manchester City |

=== Costa Rica ===
Coach: Óscar Ramírez

Costa Rica's final squad was announced on 14 May 2018. Rónald Matarrita withdrew injured and was replaced by Kenner Gutiérrez on 15 June.

| No. | Pos. | Player | Date of birth (age) | Caps | Goals | Club |
|---|---|---|---|---|---|---|
| 1 | GK | Keylor Navas | 15 December 1986 (aged 31) | 81 | 0 | (Royal Spanish Football Federation) Real Madrid |
| 2 | DF | Jhonny Acosta | 21 July 1983 (aged 34) | 69 | 2 | (Colombian Football Federation) Águilas Doradas |
| 3 | DF | Giancarlo González | 8 February 1988 (aged 30) | 70 | 2 | (Italian Football Federation) Bologna |
| 4 | DF | Ian Smith | 6 March 1998 (aged 20) | 4 | 0 | (Swedish Football Association) Norrköping |
| 5 | MF | Celso Borges | 27 May 1988 (aged 30) | 113 | 21 | (Royal Spanish Football Federation) Deportivo La Coruña |
| 6 | DF | Óscar Duarte | 3 June 1989 (aged 29) | 39 | 2 | (Royal Spanish Football Federation) Espanyol |
| 7 | MF | Christian Bolaños | 17 May 1984 (aged 34) | 81 | 6 | (Costa Rican Football Federation) Saprissa |
| 8 | DF | Bryan Oviedo | 18 February 1990 (aged 28) | 44 | 1 | (The Football Association) Sunderland |
| 9 | MF | Daniel Colindres | 10 January 1985 (aged 33) | 11 | 0 | (Costa Rican Football Federation) Saprissa |
| 10 | MF | Bryan Ruiz (captain) | 18 August 1985 (aged 32) | 110 | 24 | (Portuguese Football Federation) Sporting CP |
| 11 | FW | Johan Venegas | 27 November 1988 (aged 29) | 47 | 10 | (Costa Rican Football Federation) Saprissa |
| 12 | FW | Joel Campbell | 26 June 1992 (aged 25) | 77 | 15 | (Royal Spanish Football Federation) Real Betis |
| 13 | MF | Rodney Wallace | 17 June 1988 (aged 29) | 30 | 4 | (United States Soccer Federation) New York City FC |
| 14 | MF | Randall Azofeifa | 30 December 1984 (aged 33) | 58 | 3 | (Costa Rican Football Federation) Herediano |
| 15 | DF | Francisco Calvo | 8 July 1992 (aged 25) | 38 | 4 | (United States Soccer Federation) Minnesota United FC |
| 16 | DF | Cristian Gamboa | 24 October 1989 (aged 28) | 68 | 3 | (Scottish Football Association) Celtic |
| 17 | MF | Yeltsin Tejeda | 17 March 1992 (aged 26) | 51 | 0 | (Swiss Football Association) Lausanne |
| 18 | GK | Patrick Pemberton | 24 April 1982 (aged 36) | 39 | 0 | (Costa Rican Football Federation) Alajuelense |
| 19 | DF | Kendall Waston | 1 January 1988 (aged 30) | 26 | 3 | (Canadian Soccer Association) Vancouver Whitecaps FC |
| 20 | MF | David Guzmán | 18 February 1990 (aged 28) | 43 | 0 | (United States Soccer Federation) Portland Timbers |
| 21 | FW | Marco Ureña | 5 March 1990 (aged 28) | 64 | 15 | (United States Soccer Federation) Los Angeles FC |
| 22 | DF | Kenner Gutiérrez | 9 June 1989 (aged 29) | 9 | 0 | (Costa Rican Football Federation) Alajuelense |
| 23 | GK | Leonel Moreira | 2 April 1990 (aged 28) | 9 | 0 | (Costa Rican Football Federation) Herediano |

=== Serbia ===
Coach: Mladen Krstajić

Serbia's 27-man preliminary squad was announced on 24 May 2018. The final squad was announced on 1 June.

| No. | Pos. | Player | Date of birth (age) | Caps | Goals | Club |
|---|---|---|---|---|---|---|
| 1 | GK | Vladimir Stojković | 28 July 1983 (aged 34) | 81 | 0 | (Football Association of Serbia) Partizan |
| 2 | DF | Antonio Rukavina | 26 January 1984 (aged 34) | 47 | 0 | (Royal Spanish Football Federation) Villarreal |
| 3 | DF | Duško Tošić | 19 January 1985 (aged 33) | 24 | 1 | (Turkish Football Federation) Beşiktaş |
| 4 | MF | Luka Milivojević | 7 April 1991 (aged 27) | 28 | 1 | (The Football Association) Crystal Palace |
| 5 | DF | Uroš Spajić | 13 February 1993 (aged 25) | 5 | 0 | (Royal Belgian Football Association) Anderlecht |
| 6 | DF | Branislav Ivanović | 22 February 1984 (aged 34) | 103 | 13 | (Russian Football Union) Zenit Saint Petersburg |
| 7 | MF | Andrija Živković | 11 July 1996 (aged 21) | 10 | 0 | (Portuguese Football Federation) Benfica |
| 8 | FW | Aleksandar Prijović | 21 April 1990 (aged 28) | 9 | 1 | (Hellenic Football Federation) PAOK |
| 9 | FW | Aleksandar Mitrović | 16 September 1994 (aged 23) | 37 | 16 | (The Football Association) Fulham |
| 10 | MF | Dušan Tadić | 20 November 1988 (aged 29) | 53 | 13 | (The Football Association) Southampton |
| 11 | DF | Aleksandar Kolarov (captain) | 10 November 1985 (aged 32) | 76 | 10 | (Italian Football Federation) Roma |
| 12 | GK | Predrag Rajković | 31 October 1995 (aged 22) | 8 | 0 | (Israel Football Association) Maccabi Tel Aviv |
| 13 | DF | Miloš Veljković | 26 September 1995 (aged 22) | 2 | 0 | (German Football Association) Werder Bremen |
| 14 | DF | Milan Rodić | 2 April 1991 (aged 27) | 1 | 0 | (Football Association of Serbia) Red Star Belgrade |
| 15 | DF | Nikola Milenković | 12 October 1997 (aged 20) | 3 | 0 | (Italian Football Federation) Fiorentina |
| 16 | MF | Marko Grujić | 13 April 1996 (aged 22) | 8 | 0 | (Football Association of Wales) Cardiff City |
| 17 | MF | Filip Kostić | 1 November 1992 (aged 25) | 23 | 2 | (German Football Association) Hamburger SV |
| 18 | FW | Nemanja Radonjić | 15 February 1996 (aged 22) | 3 | 0 | (Football Association of Serbia) Red Star Belgrade |
| 19 | FW | Luka Jović | 23 December 1997 (aged 20) | 1 | 0 | (German Football Association) Eintracht Frankfurt |
| 20 | MF | Sergej Milinković-Savić | 27 February 1995 (aged 23) | 4 | 0 | (Italian Football Federation) Lazio |
| 21 | MF | Nemanja Matić | 1 August 1988 (aged 29) | 40 | 2 | (The Football Association) Manchester United |
| 22 | MF | Adem Ljajić | 29 September 1991 (aged 26) | 29 | 6 | (Italian Football Federation) Torino |
| 23 | GK | Marko Dmitrović | 24 January 1992 (aged 26) | 2 | 0 | (Royal Spanish Football Federation) Eibar |

=== Switzerland ===
Coach: (Bosnia and Herzegovina) Vladimir Petković

Switzerland's 26-man preliminary squad was announced on 25 May 2018. The final squad was announced on 4 June.

| No. | Pos. | Player | Date of birth (age) | Caps | Goals | Club |
|---|---|---|---|---|---|---|
| 1 | GK | Yann Sommer | 17 December 1988 (aged 29) | 35 | 0 | (German Football Association) Borussia Mönchengladbach |
| 2 | DF | Stephan Lichtsteiner (captain) | 16 January 1984 (aged 34) | 100 | 8 | (Italian Football Federation) Juventus |
| 3 | DF | François Moubandje | 21 June 1990 (aged 27) | 18 | 0 | (French Football Federation) Toulouse |
| 4 | DF | Nico Elvedi | 30 September 1996 (aged 21) | 6 | 0 | (German Football Association) Borussia Mönchengladbach |
| 5 | DF | Manuel Akanji | 19 July 1995 (aged 22) | 7 | 0 | (German Football Association) Borussia Dortmund |
| 6 | DF | Michael Lang | 8 February 1991 (aged 27) | 24 | 2 | (Swiss Football Association) Basel |
| 7 | FW | Breel Embolo | 14 February 1997 (aged 21) | 25 | 3 | (German Football Association) Schalke 04 |
| 8 | MF | Remo Freuler | 15 April 1992 (aged 26) | 10 | 0 | (Italian Football Federation) Atalanta |
| 9 | FW | Haris Seferovic | 22 February 1992 (aged 26) | 51 | 12 | (Portuguese Football Federation) Benfica |
| 10 | MF | Granit Xhaka | 27 September 1992 (aged 25) | 62 | 9 | (The Football Association) Arsenal |
| 11 | MF | Valon Behrami | 19 April 1985 (aged 33) | 79 | 2 | (Italian Football Federation) Udinese |
| 12 | GK | Yvon Mvogo | 6 June 1994 (aged 24) | 0 | 0 | (German Football Association) RB Leipzig |
| 13 | DF | Ricardo Rodriguez | 25 August 1992 (aged 25) | 53 | 5 | (Italian Football Federation) Milan |
| 14 | MF | Steven Zuber | 17 August 1991 (aged 26) | 12 | 3 | (German Football Association) TSG Hoffenheim |
| 15 | MF | Blerim Džemaili | 12 April 1986 (aged 32) | 65 | 9 | (Italian Football Federation) Bologna |
| 16 | MF | Gelson Fernandes | 2 September 1986 (aged 31) | 67 | 2 | (German Football Association) Eintracht Frankfurt |
| 17 | MF | Denis Zakaria | 20 November 1996 (aged 21) | 10 | 0 | (German Football Association) Borussia Mönchengladbach |
| 18 | FW | Mario Gavranović | 24 November 1989 (aged 28) | 14 | 5 | (Croatian Football Federation) Dinamo Zagreb |
| 19 | FW | Josip Drmić | 8 August 1992 (aged 25) | 29 | 9 | (German Football Association) Borussia Mönchengladbach |
| 20 | DF | Johan Djourou | 18 January 1987 (aged 31) | 74 | 2 | (Turkish Football Federation) Antalyaspor |
| 21 | GK | Roman Bürki | 14 November 1990 (aged 27) | 9 | 0 | (German Football Association) Borussia Dortmund |
| 22 | DF | Fabian Schär | 20 December 1991 (aged 26) | 39 | 7 | (Royal Spanish Football Federation) Deportivo La Coruña |
| 23 | MF | Xherdan Shaqiri | 10 October 1991 (aged 26) | 70 | 20 | (The Football Association) Stoke City |

== Group F ==
=== Germany ===
Coach: Joachim Löw

Germany's 27-man preliminary squad was announced on 15 May 2018. The final squad was announced on 4 June.

| No. | Pos. | Player | Date of birth (age) | Caps | Goals | Club |
|---|---|---|---|---|---|---|
| 1 | GK | Manuel Neuer (captain) | 27 March 1986 (aged 32) | 76 | 0 | (German Football Association) Bayern Munich |
| 2 | DF | Marvin Plattenhardt | 26 January 1992 (aged 26) | 6 | 0 | (German Football Association) Hertha BSC |
| 3 | DF | Jonas Hector | 27 May 1990 (aged 28) | 38 | 3 | (German Football Association) 1. FC Köln |
| 4 | DF | Matthias Ginter | 19 January 1994 (aged 24) | 18 | 0 | (German Football Association) Borussia Mönchengladbach |
| 5 | DF | Mats Hummels | 16 December 1988 (aged 29) | 64 | 5 | (German Football Association) Bayern Munich |
| 6 | MF | Sami Khedira | 4 April 1987 (aged 31) | 75 | 7 | (Italian Football Federation) Juventus |
| 7 | MF | Julian Draxler | 20 September 1993 (aged 24) | 44 | 6 | (French Football Federation) Paris Saint-Germain |
| 8 | MF | Toni Kroos | 4 January 1990 (aged 28) | 83 | 12 | (Royal Spanish Football Federation) Real Madrid |
| 9 | FW | Timo Werner | 6 March 1996 (aged 22) | 14 | 8 | (German Football Association) RB Leipzig |
| 10 | MF | Mesut Özil | 15 October 1988 (aged 29) | 90 | 23 | (The Football Association) Arsenal |
| 11 | FW | Marco Reus | 31 May 1989 (aged 29) | 31 | 9 | (German Football Association) Borussia Dortmund |
| 12 | GK | Kevin Trapp | 8 July 1990 (aged 27) | 3 | 0 | (French Football Federation) Paris Saint-Germain |
| 13 | MF | Thomas Müller | 13 September 1989 (aged 28) | 91 | 38 | (German Football Association) Bayern Munich |
| 14 | MF | Leon Goretzka | 6 February 1995 (aged 23) | 15 | 6 | (German Football Association) Schalke 04 |
| 15 | DF | Niklas Süle | 3 September 1995 (aged 22) | 11 | 0 | (German Football Association) Bayern Munich |
| 16 | DF | Antonio Rüdiger | 3 March 1993 (aged 25) | 24 | 1 | (The Football Association) Chelsea |
| 17 | DF | Jérôme Boateng | 3 September 1988 (aged 29) | 71 | 1 | (German Football Association) Bayern Munich |
| 18 | DF | Joshua Kimmich | 8 February 1995 (aged 23) | 29 | 3 | (German Football Association) Bayern Munich |
| 19 | MF | Sebastian Rudy | 28 February 1990 (aged 28) | 25 | 1 | (German Football Association) Bayern Munich |
| 20 | MF | Julian Brandt | 2 May 1996 (aged 22) | 16 | 1 | (German Football Association) Bayer Leverkusen |
| 21 | MF | İlkay Gündoğan | 24 October 1990 (aged 27) | 26 | 4 | (The Football Association) Manchester City |
| 22 | GK | Marc-André ter Stegen | 30 April 1992 (aged 26) | 20 | 0 | (Royal Spanish Football Federation) Barcelona |
| 23 | FW | Mario Gómez | 10 July 1985 (aged 32) | 75 | 31 | (German Football Association) VfB Stuttgart |

=== Mexico ===
Coach: (Colombia) Juan Carlos Osorio

Mexico's 28-man preliminary squad was announced on 14 May 2018. The squad was reduced to 27 players on 23 May as Néstor Araujo withdrew injured, then to 24 players on 2 June. The final squad was announced on 4 June. Diego Reyes withdrew injured and was replaced by Érick Gutiérrez on 13 June.

| No. | Pos. | Player | Date of birth (age) | Caps | Goals | Club |
|---|---|---|---|---|---|---|
| 1 | GK | José de Jesús Corona | 26 January 1981 (aged 37) | 52 | 0 | (Mexican Football Federation) Cruz Azul |
| 2 | DF | Hugo Ayala | 31 March 1987 (aged 31) | 43 | 1 | (Mexican Football Federation) Tigres UANL |
| 3 | DF | Carlos Salcedo | 29 September 1993 (aged 24) | 21 | 0 | (German Football Association) Eintracht Frankfurt |
| 4 | DF | Rafael Márquez (captain) | 13 February 1979 (aged 39) | 145 | 18 | (Mexican Football Federation) Atlas |
| 5 | MF | Érick Gutiérrez | 15 June 1995 (aged 22) | 9 | 0 | (Mexican Football Federation) Pachuca |
| 6 | MF | Jonathan dos Santos | 26 April 1990 (aged 28) | 32 | 0 | (United States Soccer Federation) LA Galaxy |
| 7 | MF | Miguel Layún | 25 June 1988 (aged 29) | 64 | 6 | (Royal Spanish Football Federation) Sevilla |
| 8 | FW | Marco Fabián | 21 July 1989 (aged 28) | 39 | 9 | (German Football Association) Eintracht Frankfurt |
| 9 | FW | Raúl Jiménez | 5 May 1991 (aged 27) | 63 | 13 | (Portuguese Football Federation) Benfica |
| 10 | MF | Giovani dos Santos | 11 May 1989 (aged 29) | 105 | 19 | (United States Soccer Federation) LA Galaxy |
| 11 | FW | Carlos Vela | 1 March 1989 (aged 29) | 68 | 18 | (United States Soccer Federation) Los Angeles FC |
| 12 | GK | Alfredo Talavera | 18 September 1982 (aged 35) | 27 | 0 | (Mexican Football Federation) Toluca |
| 13 | GK | Guillermo Ochoa | 13 July 1985 (aged 32) | 94 | 0 | (Royal Belgian Football Association) Standard Liège |
| 14 | FW | Javier Hernández | 1 June 1988 (aged 30) | 102 | 49 | (The Football Association) West Ham United |
| 15 | DF | Héctor Moreno | 17 January 1988 (aged 30) | 92 | 3 | (Royal Spanish Football Federation) Real Sociedad |
| 16 | DF | Héctor Herrera | 19 April 1990 (aged 28) | 66 | 5 | (Portuguese Football Federation) Porto |
| 17 | MF | Jesús Manuel Corona | 6 January 1993 (aged 25) | 36 | 7 | (Portuguese Football Federation) Porto |
| 18 | MF | Andrés Guardado | 28 September 1986 (aged 31) | 145 | 25 | (Royal Spanish Football Federation) Real Betis |
| 19 | FW | Oribe Peralta | 12 January 1984 (aged 34) | 67 | 26 | (Mexican Football Federation) América |
| 20 | MF | Javier Aquino | 11 February 1990 (aged 28) | 53 | 0 | (Mexican Football Federation) Tigres UANL |
| 21 | DF | Edson Álvarez | 24 October 1997 (aged 20) | 13 | 1 | (Mexican Football Federation) América |
| 22 | FW | Hirving Lozano | 30 July 1995 (aged 22) | 28 | 7 | (Royal Dutch Football Association) PSV Eindhoven |
| 23 | MF | Jesús Gallardo | 15 August 1994 (aged 23) | 23 | 0 | (Mexican Football Federation) Pumas UNAM |

=== South Korea ===
Coach: Shin Tae-yong

South Korea's 28-man preliminary squad was announced on 14 May 2018. The squad was reduced to 26 players on 22 May as Kwon Chang-hoon and Lee Keun-ho withdrew injured. The final squad was announced on 2 June.

| No. | Pos. | Player | Date of birth (age) | Caps | Goals | Club |
|---|---|---|---|---|---|---|
| 1 | GK | Kim Seung-gyu | 30 September 1990 (aged 27) | 33 | 0 | (Japan Football Association) Vissel Kobe |
| 2 | DF | Lee Yong | 24 December 1986 (aged 31) | 28 | 0 | (Korea Football Association) Jeonbuk Hyundai Motors |
| 3 | DF | Jung Seung-hyun | 3 April 1994 (aged 24) | 6 | 0 | (Japan Football Association) Sagan Tosu |
| 4 | DF | Oh Ban-suk | 20 May 1988 (aged 30) | 2 | 0 | (Korea Football Association) Jeju United |
| 5 | DF | Yun Young-sun | 4 October 1988 (aged 29) | 6 | 0 | (Korea Football Association) Seongnam FC |
| 6 | DF | Park Joo-ho | 16 January 1987 (aged 31) | 36 | 0 | (Korea Football Association) Ulsan Hyundai |
| 7 | FW | Son Heung-min | 8 July 1992 (aged 25) | 67 | 21 | (The Football Association) Tottenham Hotspur |
| 8 | MF | Ju Se-jong | 30 October 1990 (aged 27) | 11 | 1 | (Korea Football Association) Asan Mugunghwa |
| 9 | FW | Kim Shin-wook | 14 April 1988 (aged 30) | 50 | 10 | (Korea Football Association) Jeonbuk Hyundai Motors |
| 10 | MF | Lee Seung-woo | 6 January 1998 (aged 20) | 4 | 0 | (Italian Football Federation) Hellas Verona |
| 11 | FW | Hwang Hee-chan | 26 January 1996 (aged 22) | 14 | 2 | (Austrian Football Association) Red Bull Salzburg |
| 12 | DF | Kim Min-woo | 25 February 1990 (aged 28) | 20 | 1 | (Korea Football Association) Sangju Sangmu |
| 13 | MF | Koo Ja-cheol | 27 February 1989 (aged 29) | 68 | 19 | (German Football Association) FC Augsburg |
| 14 | DF | Hong Chul | 17 September 1990 (aged 27) | 14 | 0 | (Korea Football Association) Sangju Sangmu |
| 15 | MF | Jung Woo-young | 14 December 1989 (aged 28) | 30 | 1 | (Japan Football Association) Vissel Kobe |
| 16 | MF | Ki Sung-yueng (captain) | 24 January 1989 (aged 29) | 102 | 10 | (Football Association of Wales) Swansea City |
| 17 | MF | Lee Jae-sung | 10 August 1992 (aged 25) | 35 | 6 | (Korea Football Association) Jeonbuk Hyundai Motors |
| 18 | MF | Moon Seon-min | 9 June 1992 (aged 26) | 3 | 1 | (Korea Football Association) Incheon United |
| 19 | DF | Kim Young-gwon | 27 February 1990 (aged 28) | 53 | 2 | (Chinese Football Association) Guangzhou Evergrande |
| 20 | DF | Jang Hyun-soo | 28 September 1991 (aged 26) | 51 | 3 | (Japan Football Association) FC Tokyo |
| 21 | GK | Kim Jin-hyeon | 6 July 1987 (aged 30) | 15 | 0 | (Japan Football Association) Cerezo Osaka |
| 22 | DF | Go Yo-han | 10 March 1988 (aged 30) | 20 | 0 | (Korea Football Association) FC Seoul |
| 23 | GK | Jo Hyeon-woo | 25 September 1991 (aged 26) | 6 | 0 | (Korea Football Association) Daegu FC |

=== Sweden ===
Coach: Janne Andersson

Sweden's final squad was announced on 15 May 2018.

| No. | Pos. | Player | Date of birth (age) | Caps | Goals | Club |
|---|---|---|---|---|---|---|
| 1 | GK | Robin Olsen | 8 January 1990 (aged 28) | 18 | 0 | (Danish Football Association) Copenhagen |
| 2 | DF | Mikael Lustig | 13 December 1986 (aged 31) | 66 | 6 | (Scottish Football Association) Celtic |
| 3 | DF | Victor Lindelöf | 17 July 1994 (aged 23) | 21 | 1 | (The Football Association) Manchester United |
| 4 | DF | Andreas Granqvist (captain) | 16 April 1985 (aged 33) | 72 | 6 | (Russian Football Union) Krasnodar |
| 5 | DF | Martin Olsson | 17 May 1988 (aged 30) | 43 | 5 | (Football Association of Wales) Swansea City |
| 6 | DF | Ludwig Augustinsson | 21 April 1994 (aged 24) | 15 | 0 | (German Football Association) Werder Bremen |
| 7 | MF | Sebastian Larsson | 6 June 1985 (aged 33) | 100 | 6 | (The Football Association) Hull City |
| 8 | MF | Albin Ekdal | 28 July 1989 (aged 28) | 34 | 0 | (German Football Association) Hamburger SV |
| 9 | FW | Marcus Berg | 17 August 1986 (aged 31) | 57 | 18 | (United Arab Emirates Football Association) Al Ain |
| 10 | MF | Emil Forsberg | 23 October 1991 (aged 26) | 36 | 6 | (German Football Association) RB Leipzig |
| 11 | FW | John Guidetti | 15 April 1992 (aged 26) | 20 | 1 | (Royal Spanish Football Federation) Alavés |
| 12 | GK | Karl-Johan Johnsson | 28 January 1990 (aged 28) | 5 | 0 | (French Football Federation) Guingamp |
| 13 | MF | Gustav Svensson | 7 February 1987 (aged 31) | 13 | 0 | (United States Soccer Federation) Seattle Sounders FC |
| 14 | DF | Filip Helander | 22 April 1993 (aged 25) | 4 | 0 | (Italian Football Federation) Bologna |
| 15 | MF | Oscar Hiljemark | 28 June 1992 (aged 25) | 22 | 2 | (Italian Football Federation) Genoa |
| 16 | DF | Emil Krafth | 2 August 1994 (aged 23) | 13 | 0 | (Italian Football Federation) Bologna |
| 17 | MF | Viktor Claesson | 2 January 1992 (aged 26) | 22 | 3 | (Russian Football Union) Krasnodar |
| 18 | DF | Pontus Jansson | 13 February 1991 (aged 27) | 15 | 0 | (The Football Association) Leeds United |
| 19 | MF | Marcus Rohdén | 11 May 1991 (aged 27) | 12 | 1 | (Italian Football Federation) Crotone |
| 20 | FW | Ola Toivonen | 3 July 1986 (aged 31) | 59 | 13 | (French Football Federation) Toulouse |
| 21 | MF | Jimmy Durmaz | 22 March 1989 (aged 29) | 45 | 3 | (French Football Federation) Toulouse |
| 22 | FW | Isaac Kiese Thelin | 24 June 1992 (aged 25) | 20 | 2 | (Royal Belgian Football Association) Waasland-Beveren |
| 23 | GK | Kristoffer Nordfeldt | 23 June 1989 (aged 28) | 8 | 0 | (Football Association of Wales) Swansea City |

== Group G ==
=== Belgium ===
Coach: (Spain) Roberto Martínez

Belgium's 28-man preliminary squad was announced on 21 May 2018. The final squad was announced on 4 June.

| No. | Pos. | Player | Date of birth (age) | Caps | Goals | Club |
|---|---|---|---|---|---|---|
| 1 | GK | Thibaut Courtois | 11 May 1992 (aged 26) | 58 | 0 | (The Football Association) Chelsea |
| 2 | DF | Toby Alderweireld | 2 March 1989 (aged 29) | 77 | 3 | (The Football Association) Tottenham Hotspur |
| 3 | DF | Thomas Vermaelen | 14 November 1985 (aged 32) | 66 | 1 | (Royal Spanish Football Federation) Barcelona |
| 4 | DF | Vincent Kompany | 10 April 1986 (aged 32) | 77 | 4 | (The Football Association) Manchester City |
| 5 | DF | Jan Vertonghen | 24 April 1987 (aged 31) | 102 | 8 | (The Football Association) Tottenham Hotspur |
| 6 | MF | Axel Witsel | 12 January 1989 (aged 29) | 90 | 9 | (Chinese Football Association) Tianjin Quanjian |
| 7 | MF | Kevin De Bruyne | 28 June 1991 (aged 26) | 62 | 14 | (The Football Association) Manchester City |
| 8 | MF | Marouane Fellaini | 22 November 1987 (aged 30) | 82 | 17 | (The Football Association) Manchester United |
| 9 | FW | Romelu Lukaku | 13 May 1993 (aged 25) | 69 | 36 | (The Football Association) Manchester United |
| 10 | FW | Eden Hazard (Captain) | 7 January 1991 (aged 27) | 86 | 22 | (The Football Association) Chelsea |
| 11 | MF | Yannick Carrasco | 4 September 1993 (aged 24) | 26 | 5 | (Chinese Football Association) Dalian Yifang |
| 12 | GK | Simon Mignolet | 6 March 1988 (aged 30) | 21 | 0 | (The Football Association) Liverpool |
| 13 | GK | Koen Casteels | 25 June 1992 (aged 25) | 0 | 0 | (German Football Association) VfL Wolfsburg |
| 14 | FW | Dries Mertens | 6 May 1987 (aged 31) | 69 | 14 | (Italian Football Federation) Napoli |
| 15 | DF | Thomas Meunier | 12 September 1991 (aged 26) | 25 | 5 | (French Football Federation) Paris Saint-Germain |
| 16 | MF | Thorgan Hazard | 29 March 1993 (aged 25) | 11 | 1 | (German Football Association) Borussia Mönchengladbach |
| 17 | MF | Youri Tielemans | 7 May 1997 (aged 21) | 9 | 0 | (French Football Federation) Monaco |
| 18 | FW | Adnan Januzaj | 5 February 1995 (aged 23) | 8 | 0 | (Royal Spanish Football Federation) Real Sociedad |
| 19 | MF | Mousa Dembélé | 16 July 1987 (aged 30) | 76 | 5 | (The Football Association) Tottenham Hotspur |
| 20 | DF | Dedryck Boyata | 28 November 1990 (aged 27) | 7 | 0 | (Scottish Football Association) Celtic |
| 21 | FW | Michy Batshuayi | 2 October 1993 (aged 24) | 16 | 7 | (German Football Association) Borussia Dortmund |
| 22 | MF | Nacer Chadli | 2 August 1989 (aged 28) | 45 | 5 | (The Football Association) West Bromwich Albion |
| 23 | DF | Leander Dendoncker | 15 April 1995 (aged 23) | 5 | 0 | (Royal Belgian Football Association) Anderlecht |

=== England ===
Coach: Gareth Southgate

England's final squad was announced on 16 May 2018.

| No. | Pos. | Player | Date of birth (age) | Caps | Goals | Club |
|---|---|---|---|---|---|---|
| 1 | GK | Jordan Pickford | 7 March 1994 (aged 24) | 3 | 0 | (The Football Association) Everton |
| 2 | DF | Kyle Walker | 28 May 1990 (aged 28) | 35 | 0 | (The Football Association) Manchester City |
| 3 | DF | Danny Rose | 2 July 1990 (aged 27) | 18 | 0 | (The Football Association) Tottenham Hotspur |
| 4 | MF | Eric Dier | 15 January 1994 (aged 24) | 26 | 3 | (The Football Association) Tottenham Hotspur |
| 5 | DF | John Stones | 28 May 1994 (aged 24) | 26 | 0 | (The Football Association) Manchester City |
| 6 | DF | Harry Maguire | 5 March 1993 (aged 25) | 5 | 0 | (The Football Association) Leicester City |
| 7 | MF | Jesse Lingard | 15 December 1992 (aged 25) | 12 | 1 | (The Football Association) Manchester United |
| 8 | MF | Jordan Henderson | 17 June 1990 (aged 27) | 39 | 0 | (The Football Association) Liverpool |
| 9 | FW | Harry Kane (captain) | 28 July 1993 (aged 24) | 24 | 13 | (The Football Association) Tottenham Hotspur |
| 10 | FW | Raheem Sterling | 8 December 1994 (aged 23) | 38 | 2 | (The Football Association) Manchester City |
| 11 | FW | Jamie Vardy | 11 January 1987 (aged 31) | 22 | 7 | (The Football Association) Leicester City |
| 12 | DF | Kieran Trippier | 19 September 1990 (aged 27) | 7 | 0 | (The Football Association) Tottenham Hotspur |
| 13 | GK | Jack Butland | 10 March 1993 (aged 25) | 8 | 0 | (The Football Association) Stoke City |
| 14 | FW | Danny Welbeck | 26 November 1990 (aged 27) | 39 | 16 | (The Football Association) Arsenal |
| 15 | DF | Gary Cahill | 19 December 1985 (aged 32) | 60 | 5 | (The Football Association) Chelsea |
| 16 | DF | Phil Jones | 21 February 1992 (aged 26) | 25 | 0 | (The Football Association) Manchester United |
| 17 | DF | Fabian Delph | 21 November 1989 (aged 28) | 11 | 0 | (The Football Association) Manchester City |
| 18 | DF | Ashley Young | 9 July 1985 (aged 32) | 34 | 7 | (The Football Association) Manchester United |
| 19 | FW | Marcus Rashford | 31 October 1997 (aged 20) | 19 | 3 | (The Football Association) Manchester United |
| 20 | MF | Dele Alli | 11 April 1996 (aged 22) | 25 | 2 | (The Football Association) Tottenham Hotspur |
| 21 | MF | Ruben Loftus-Cheek | 23 January 1996 (aged 22) | 4 | 0 | (The Football Association) Crystal Palace |
| 22 | DF | Trent Alexander-Arnold | 7 October 1998 (aged 19) | 1 | 0 | (The Football Association) Liverpool |
| 23 | GK | Nick Pope | 19 April 1992 (aged 26) | 1 | 0 | (The Football Association) Burnley |

=== Panama ===
Coach: (Colombia) Hernán Darío Gómez

Panama's 35-man preliminary squad was announced on 14 May 2018. The final squad was announced on 30 May. Alberto Quintero withdrew injured and was replaced by Ricardo Ávila on 6 June.

| No. | Pos. | Player | Date of birth (age) | Caps | Goals | Club |
|---|---|---|---|---|---|---|
| 1 | GK | Jaime Penedo | 26 September 1981 (aged 36) | 131 | 0 | (Romanian Football Federation) Dinamo București |
| 2 | DF | Michael Amir Murillo | 11 February 1996 (aged 22) | 22 | 2 | (United States Soccer Federation) New York Red Bulls |
| 3 | DF | Harold Cummings | 1 March 1992 (aged 26) | 52 | 0 | (United States Soccer Federation) San Jose Earthquakes |
| 4 | DF | Fidel Escobar | 9 January 1995 (aged 23) | 23 | 1 | (United States Soccer Federation) New York Red Bulls |
| 5 | DF | Román Torres | 20 March 1986 (aged 32) | 111 | 10 | (United States Soccer Federation) Seattle Sounders FC |
| 6 | MF | Gabriel Gómez | 29 May 1984 (aged 34) | 144 | 12 | (Colombian Football Federation) Atlético Bucaramanga |
| 7 | FW | Blas Pérez | 13 March 1981 (aged 37) | 118 | 43 | (National Football Federation of Guatemala) Municipal |
| 8 | MF | Yoel Bárcenas | 23 October 1993 (aged 24) | 29 | 0 | (Mexican Football Federation) Tapachula |
| 9 | FW | Gabriel Torres | 31 October 1988 (aged 29) | 72 | 14 | (Football Federation of Chile) Huachipato |
| 10 | FW | Ismael Díaz | 12 May 1997 (aged 21) | 11 | 2 | (Royal Spanish Football Federation) Deportivo Fabril |
| 11 | MF | Armando Cooper | 26 November 1987 (aged 30) | 98 | 7 | (Football Federation of Chile) Universidad de Chile |
| 12 | GK | José Calderón | 14 August 1985 (aged 32) | 31 | 0 | (Panamanian Football Federation) Chorrillo |
| 13 | DF | Adolfo Machado | 14 February 1985 (aged 33) | 76 | 1 | (United States Soccer Federation) Houston Dynamo |
| 14 | MF | Valentín Pimentel | 30 May 1991 (aged 27) | 23 | 1 | (Panamanian Football Federation) Plaza Amador |
| 15 | DF | Eric Davis | 31 March 1991 (aged 27) | 38 | 0 | (Slovak Football Association) Dunajská Streda |
| 16 | FW | Abdiel Arroyo | 13 December 1993 (aged 24) | 33 | 5 | (Costa Rican Football Federation) Alajuelense |
| 17 | DF | Luis Ovalle | 7 September 1988 (aged 29) | 25 | 0 | (National Autonomous Federation of Football of Honduras) CD Olimpia |
| 18 | FW | Luis Tejada | 28 March 1982 (aged 36) | 105 | 43 | (Peruvian Football Federation) Sport Boys |
| 19 | MF | Ricardo Ávila | 4 February 1997 (aged 21) | 5 | 0 | (Royal Belgian Football Association) Gent |
| 20 | MF | Aníbal Godoy | 10 February 1990 (aged 28) | 88 | 1 | (United States Soccer Federation) San Jose Earthquakes |
| 21 | MF | José Luis Rodríguez | 19 June 1998 (aged 19) | 2 | 0 | (Royal Belgian Football Association) Gent |
| 22 | GK | Álex Rodríguez | 5 August 1990 (aged 27) | 6 | 0 | (Panamanian Football Federation) San Francisco |
| 23 | DF | Felipe Baloy (captain) | 24 February 1981 (aged 37) | 102 | 3 | (National Football Federation of Guatemala) Municipal |

=== Tunisia ===
Coach: Nabil Maâloul

Tunisia's 29-man preliminary squad was announced on 14 May 2018. The final squad was announced on 2 June.

| No. | Pos. | Player | Date of birth (age) | Caps | Goals | Club |
|---|---|---|---|---|---|---|
| 1 | GK | Farouk Ben Mustapha | 1 July 1989 (aged 28) | 15 | 0 | (Saudi Arabian Football Federation) Al Shabab |
| 2 | DF | Syam Ben Youssef | 31 March 1989 (aged 29) | 42 | 1 | (Turkish Football Federation) Kasımpaşa |
| 3 | DF | Yohan Benalouane | 28 March 1987 (aged 31) | 4 | 0 | (The Football Association) Leicester City |
| 4 | DF | Yassine Meriah | 2 July 1993 (aged 24) | 16 | 1 | (Tunisian Football Federation) CS Sfaxien |
| 5 | DF | Oussama Haddadi | 28 January 1992 (aged 26) | 9 | 0 | (French Football Federation) Dijon |
| 6 | DF | Rami Bedoui | 19 January 1990 (aged 28) | 8 | 0 | (Tunisian Football Federation) Étoile du Sahel |
| 7 | FW | Saîf-Eddine Khaoui | 27 April 1995 (aged 23) | 5 | 0 | (French Football Federation) Troyes |
| 8 | FW | Fakhreddine Ben Youssef | 23 June 1991 (aged 26) | 39 | 5 | (Saudi Arabian Football Federation) Al-Ettifaq |
| 9 | MF | Anice Badri | 18 September 1990 (aged 27) | 7 | 2 | (Tunisian Football Federation) Espérance de Tunis |
| 10 | FW | Wahbi Khazri | 8 February 1991 (aged 27) | 35 | 12 | (French Football Federation) Rennes |
| 11 | DF | Dylan Bronn | 19 June 1995 (aged 22) | 5 | 0 | (Royal Belgian Football Association) Gent |
| 12 | DF | Ali Maâloul | 1 January 1990 (aged 28) | 46 | 0 | (Egyptian Football Association) Al Ahly |
| 13 | MF | Ferjani Sassi | 18 March 1992 (aged 26) | 39 | 3 | (Saudi Arabian Football Federation) Al Nassr |
| 14 | MF | Mohamed Amine Ben Amor | 3 May 1992 (aged 26) | 26 | 1 | (Saudi Arabian Football Federation) Al Ahli |
| 15 | FW | Ahmed Khalil | 21 December 1994 (aged 23) | 3 | 0 | (Tunisian Football Federation) Club Africain |
| 16 | GK | Aymen Mathlouthi (captain) | 14 September 1984 (aged 33) | 70 | 0 | (Saudi Arabian Football Federation) Al Batin |
| 17 | MF | Ellyes Skhiri | 10 May 1995 (aged 23) | 5 | 0 | (French Football Federation) Montpellier |
| 18 | FW | Bassem Srarfi | 25 June 1997 (aged 20) | 5 | 0 | (French Football Federation) Nice |
| 19 | FW | Saber Khalifa | 14 October 1986 (aged 31) | 44 | 7 | (Tunisian Football Federation) Club Africain |
| 20 | FW | Ghailene Chaalali | 28 February 1994 (aged 24) | 6 | 1 | (Tunisian Football Federation) Espérance de Tunis |
| 21 | DF | Hamdi Nagguez | 28 October 1992 (aged 25) | 15 | 0 | (Egyptian Football Association) Zamalek |
| 22 | GK | Mouez Hassen | 5 March 1995 (aged 23) | 3 | 0 | (French Football Federation) Châteauroux |
| 23 | FW | Naïm Sliti | 27 July 1992 (aged 25) | 17 | 3 | (French Football Federation) Dijon |

== Group H ==
=== Colombia ===
Coach: (Argentina) José Pékerman

Colombia's 35-man preliminary squad was announced on 14 May 2018. The final squad was announced on 4 June. Frank Fabra withdrew injured and was replaced by Farid Díaz on 9 June.

| No. | Pos. | Player | Date of birth (age) | Caps | Goals | Club |
|---|---|---|---|---|---|---|
| 1 | GK | David Ospina | 31 August 1988 (aged 29) | 86 | 0 | (The Football Association) Arsenal |
| 2 | DF | Cristián Zapata | 30 September 1986 (aged 31) | 55 | 2 | (Italian Football Federation) Milan |
| 3 | DF | Óscar Murillo | 18 April 1988 (aged 30) | 13 | 0 | (Mexican Football Federation) Pachuca |
| 4 | DF | Santiago Arias | 13 January 1992 (aged 26) | 41 | 0 | (Royal Dutch Football Association) PSV Eindhoven |
| 5 | MF | Wilmar Barrios | 16 October 1993 (aged 24) | 10 | 0 | (Argentine Football Association) Boca Juniors |
| 6 | MF | Carlos Sánchez | 6 February 1986 (aged 32) | 85 | 0 | (Royal Spanish Football Federation) Espanyol |
| 7 | FW | Carlos Bacca | 8 September 1986 (aged 31) | 45 | 14 | (Royal Spanish Football Federation) Villarreal |
| 8 | MF | Abel Aguilar | 6 January 1985 (aged 33) | 70 | 7 | (Colombian Football Federation) Deportivo Cali |
| 9 | FW | Radamel Falcao (captain) | 10 February 1986 (aged 32) | 73 | 29 | (French Football Federation) Monaco |
| 10 | MF | James Rodríguez | 12 July 1991 (aged 26) | 63 | 21 | (German Football Association) Bayern Munich |
| 11 | MF | Juan Cuadrado | 26 May 1988 (aged 30) | 70 | 7 | (Italian Football Federation) Juventus |
| 12 | GK | Camilo Vargas | 9 March 1989 (aged 29) | 5 | 0 | (Colombian Football Federation) Deportivo Cali |
| 13 | DF | Yerry Mina | 23 September 1994 (aged 23) | 12 | 3 | (Royal Spanish Football Federation) Barcelona |
| 14 | FW | Luis Muriel | 16 April 1991 (aged 27) | 18 | 2 | (Royal Spanish Football Federation) Sevilla |
| 15 | MF | Mateus Uribe | 21 March 1991 (aged 27) | 8 | 0 | (Mexican Football Federation) América |
| 16 | MF | Jefferson Lerma | 25 October 1994 (aged 23) | 5 | 0 | (Royal Spanish Football Federation) Levante |
| 17 | DF | Johan Mojica | 21 August 1992 (aged 25) | 4 | 1 | (Royal Spanish Football Federation) Girona |
| 18 | DF | Farid Díaz | 20 July 1983 (aged 34) | 13 | 0 | (Paraguayan Football Association) Olimpia |
| 19 | FW | Miguel Borja | 26 January 1993 (aged 25) | 7 | 2 | (Brazilian Football Confederation) Palmeiras |
| 20 | MF | Juan Fernando Quintero | 18 January 1993 (aged 25) | 15 | 2 | (Argentine Football Association) River Plate |
| 21 | FW | José Izquierdo | 7 July 1992 (aged 25) | 5 | 1 | (The Football Association) Brighton & Hove Albion |
| 22 | GK | José Fernando Cuadrado | 1 June 1985 (aged 33) | 1 | 0 | (Colombian Football Federation) Once Caldas |
| 23 | DF | Davinson Sánchez | 12 June 1996 (aged 22) | 9 | 0 | (The Football Association) Tottenham Hotspur |

=== Japan ===
Coach: Akira Nishino

Japan's 27-man preliminary squad was announced on 18 May 2018. The final squad was announced on 31 May.

| No. | Pos. | Player | Date of birth (age) | Caps | Goals | Club |
|---|---|---|---|---|---|---|
| 1 | GK | Eiji Kawashima | 20 March 1983 (aged 35) | 84 | 0 | (French Football Federation) Metz |
| 2 | DF | Naomichi Ueda | 24 October 1994 (aged 23) | 4 | 0 | (Japan Football Association) Kashima Antlers |
| 3 | DF | Gen Shoji | 11 December 1992 (aged 25) | 11 | 1 | (Japan Football Association) Kashima Antlers |
| 4 | MF | Keisuke Honda | 13 June 1986 (aged 32) | 95 | 36 | (Mexican Football Federation) Pachuca |
| 5 | DF | Yūto Nagatomo | 12 September 1986 (aged 31) | 105 | 3 | (Turkish Football Federation) Galatasaray |
| 6 | DF | Wataru Endo | 9 February 1993 (aged 25) | 12 | 0 | (Japan Football Association) Urawa Red Diamonds |
| 7 | MF | Gaku Shibasaki | 28 May 1992 (aged 26) | 18 | 3 | (Royal Spanish Football Federation) Getafe |
| 8 | MF | Genki Haraguchi | 9 May 1991 (aged 27) | 33 | 6 | (German Football Association) Fortuna Düsseldorf |
| 9 | FW | Shinji Okazaki | 16 April 1986 (aged 32) | 113 | 50 | (The Football Association) Leicester City |
| 10 | MF | Shinji Kagawa | 17 March 1989 (aged 29) | 92 | 30 | (German Football Association) Borussia Dortmund |
| 11 | MF | Takashi Usami | 6 May 1992 (aged 26) | 24 | 3 | (German Football Association) Fortuna Düsseldorf |
| 12 | GK | Masaaki Higashiguchi | 12 May 1986 (aged 32) | 5 | 0 | (Japan Football Association) Gamba Osaka |
| 13 | FW | Yoshinori Muto | 15 July 1992 (aged 25) | 24 | 2 | (German Football Association) Mainz 05 |
| 14 | MF | Takashi Inui | 2 June 1988 (aged 30) | 27 | 4 | (Royal Spanish Football Federation) Eibar |
| 15 | FW | Yuya Osako | 18 May 1990 (aged 28) | 29 | 7 | (German Football Association) 1. FC Köln |
| 16 | MF | Hotaru Yamaguchi | 6 October 1990 (aged 27) | 42 | 2 | (Japan Football Association) Cerezo Osaka |
| 17 | MF | Makoto Hasebe (captain) | 18 January 1984 (aged 34) | 110 | 2 | (German Football Association) Eintracht Frankfurt |
| 18 | MF | Ryota Oshima | 23 January 1993 (aged 25) | 5 | 0 | (Japan Football Association) Kawasaki Frontale |
| 19 | DF | Hiroki Sakai | 12 April 1990 (aged 28) | 43 | 0 | (French Football Federation) Marseille |
| 20 | DF | Tomoaki Makino | 11 May 1987 (aged 31) | 32 | 4 | (Japan Football Association) Urawa Red Diamonds |
| 21 | DF | Gōtoku Sakai | 14 March 1991 (aged 27) | 41 | 0 | (German Football Association) Hamburger SV |
| 22 | DF | Maya Yoshida | 24 August 1988 (aged 29) | 82 | 10 | (The Football Association) Southampton |
| 23 | GK | Kosuke Nakamura | 27 February 1995 (aged 23) | 4 | 0 | (Japan Football Association) Kashiwa Reysol |

=== Poland ===
Coach: Adam Nawałka

Poland's 35-man preliminary squad was announced on 11 May 2018. The squad was reduced to 32 players on 18 May. The final squad was announced on 4 June.

| No. | Pos. | Player | Date of birth (age) | Caps | Goals | Club |
|---|---|---|---|---|---|---|
| 1 | GK | Wojciech Szczęsny | 18 April 1990 (aged 28) | 35 | 0 | (Italian Football Federation) Juventus |
| 2 | DF | Michał Pazdan | 21 September 1987 (aged 30) | 33 | 0 | (Polish Football Association) Legia Warsaw |
| 3 | DF | Artur Jędrzejczyk | 4 November 1987 (aged 30) | 36 | 3 | (Polish Football Association) Legia Warsaw |
| 4 | DF | Thiago Cionek | 21 April 1986 (aged 32) | 19 | 0 | (Italian Football Federation) SPAL |
| 5 | DF | Jan Bednarek | 12 April 1996 (aged 22) | 3 | 0 | (The Football Association) Southampton |
| 6 | MF | Jacek Góralski | 21 September 1992 (aged 25) | 5 | 0 | (Bulgarian Football Union) Ludogorets Razgrad |
| 7 | FW | Arkadiusz Milik | 28 February 1994 (aged 24) | 40 | 12 | (Italian Football Federation) Napoli |
| 8 | MF | Karol Linetty | 2 February 1995 (aged 23) | 20 | 1 | (Italian Football Federation) Sampdoria |
| 9 | FW | Robert Lewandowski (captain) | 21 August 1988 (aged 29) | 95 | 55 | (German Football Association) Bayern Munich |
| 10 | MF | Grzegorz Krychowiak | 29 January 1990 (aged 28) | 51 | 2 | (The Football Association) West Bromwich Albion |
| 11 | MF | Kamil Grosicki | 8 June 1988 (aged 30) | 57 | 12 | (The Football Association) Hull City |
| 12 | GK | Bartosz Białkowski | 6 July 1987 (aged 30) | 1 | 0 | (The Football Association) Ipswich Town |
| 13 | MF | Maciej Rybus | 19 August 1989 (aged 28) | 51 | 2 | (Russian Football Union) Lokomotiv Moscow |
| 14 | FW | Łukasz Teodorczyk | 3 June 1991 (aged 27) | 17 | 4 | (Royal Belgian Football Association) Anderlecht |
| 15 | DF | Kamil Glik | 3 February 1988 (aged 30) | 57 | 4 | (French Football Federation) Monaco |
| 16 | MF | Jakub Błaszczykowski | 14 December 1985 (aged 32) | 99 | 20 | (German Football Association) VfL Wolfsburg |
| 17 | MF | Sławomir Peszko | 19 February 1985 (aged 33) | 43 | 2 | (Polish Football Association) Lechia Gdańsk |
| 18 | DF | Bartosz Bereszyński | 12 July 1992 (aged 25) | 8 | 0 | (Italian Football Federation) Sampdoria |
| 19 | MF | Piotr Zieliński | 20 May 1994 (aged 24) | 33 | 5 | (Italian Football Federation) Napoli |
| 20 | DF | Łukasz Piszczek | 3 June 1985 (aged 33) | 63 | 3 | (German Football Association) Borussia Dortmund |
| 21 | MF | Rafał Kurzawa | 29 January 1993 (aged 25) | 3 | 0 | (Polish Football Association) Górnik Zabrze |
| 22 | GK | Łukasz Fabiański | 18 April 1985 (aged 33) | 45 | 0 | (Football Association of Wales) Swansea City |
| 23 | FW | Dawid Kownacki | 14 March 1997 (aged 21) | 2 | 1 | (Italian Football Federation) Sampdoria |

=== Senegal ===
Coach: Aliou Cissé

Senegal's final squad was announced on 17 May 2018. Saliou Ciss withdrew injured and was replaced by Adama Mbengue on 17 June.

| No. | Pos. | Player | Date of birth (age) | Caps | Goals | Club |
|---|---|---|---|---|---|---|
| 1 | GK | Abdoulaye Diallo | 30 March 1992 (aged 26) | 17 | 0 | (French Football Federation) Rennes |
| 2 | DF | Adama Mbengue | 1 December 1993 (aged 24) | 6 | 0 | (French Football Federation) Caen |
| 3 | DF | Kalidou Koulibaly | 20 June 1991 (aged 26) | 26 | 0 | (Italian Football Federation) Napoli |
| 4 | DF | Kara Mbodji | 22 November 1989 (aged 28) | 52 | 5 | (Royal Belgian Football Association) Anderlecht |
| 5 | MF | Idrissa Gueye | 26 September 1989 (aged 28) | 61 | 1 | (The Football Association) Everton |
| 6 | DF | Salif Sané | 25 August 1990 (aged 27) | 22 | 0 | (German Football Association) Hannover 96 |
| 7 | FW | Moussa Sow | 19 January 1986 (aged 32) | 51 | 18 | (Turkish Football Federation) Bursaspor |
| 8 | MF | Cheikhou Kouyaté (captain) | 21 December 1989 (aged 28) | 48 | 2 | (The Football Association) West Ham United |
| 9 | FW | Mame Biram Diouf | 16 December 1987 (aged 30) | 49 | 10 | (The Football Association) Stoke City |
| 10 | FW | Sadio Mané | 10 April 1992 (aged 26) | 53 | 14 | (The Football Association) Liverpool |
| 11 | MF | Cheikh N'Doye | 29 March 1986 (aged 32) | 26 | 3 | (The Football Association) Birmingham City |
| 12 | DF | Youssouf Sabaly | 5 March 1993 (aged 25) | 5 | 0 | (French Football Federation) Bordeaux |
| 13 | MF | Alfred N'Diaye | 6 March 1990 (aged 28) | 21 | 0 | (The Football Association) Wolverhampton Wanderers |
| 14 | FW | Moussa Konaté | 3 April 1993 (aged 25) | 28 | 10 | (French Football Federation) Amiens |
| 15 | FW | Diafra Sakho | 24 December 1989 (aged 28) | 12 | 3 | (French Football Federation) Rennes |
| 16 | GK | Khadim N'Diaye | 5 April 1985 (aged 33) | 26 | 0 | (Guinean Football Federation) Horoya |
| 17 | MF | Badou Ndiaye | 27 October 1990 (aged 27) | 20 | 1 | (The Football Association) Stoke City |
| 18 | FW | Ismaïla Sarr | 25 February 1998 (aged 20) | 16 | 3 | (French Football Federation) Rennes |
| 19 | FW | M'Baye Niang | 19 December 1994 (aged 23) | 7 | 0 | (Italian Football Federation) Torino |
| 20 | FW | Keita Baldé | 8 March 1995 (aged 23) | 19 | 3 | (French Football Federation) Monaco |
| 21 | DF | Lamine Gassama | 20 October 1989 (aged 28) | 36 | 0 | (Turkish Football Federation) Alanyaspor |
| 22 | DF | Moussa Wagué | 4 October 1998 (aged 19) | 10 | 0 | (Royal Belgian Football Association) Eupen |
| 23 | GK | Alfred Gomis | 5 September 1993 (aged 24) | 1 | 0 | (Italian Football Federation) SPAL |

== Statistics ==
=== Age ===
Of the seven teenagers in the competition, Australia's Daniel Arzani was the youngest at 19 years, 161 days as of the first day of the tournament, and Nigeria's Francis Uzoho was the youngest goalkeeper. At 45 years, 150 days, Egypt's Essam El Hadary was the oldest player and oldest captain, as well as the oldest player to ever be named to a FIFA World Cup squad. Mexico's Rafael Márquez was the oldest outfield player at 39. The youngest captain was England's Harry Kane, at 24 years of age.

The average age of all 736 players – almost 28 years – was the oldest in the tournament's history.

==== Players ====
- Oldest: (Egypt) Essam El Hadary (45 years, 150 days)
- Youngest: (Australia) Daniel Arzani (19 years, 161 days)

==== Goalkeepers ====
- Oldest: (Egypt) Essam El Hadary (45 years, 150 days)
- Youngest: (Nigeria) Francis Uzoho (19 years, 229 days)

==== Captains ====
- Oldest: (Egypt) Essam El Hadary (45 years, 150 days)
- Youngest: (England) Harry Kane (24 years, 321 days)

=== Player representation by league system ===
League systems with 20 or more players represented are listed. In all, World Cup squad members played for clubs in 57 countries, and played in 54 national league systems, as the league systems of England and France included clubs from Wales and Monaco respectively, and one league system covered both the United States and Canada.

| Country | Players | Percentage | Outside national squad | Lower tier players |
|---|---|---|---|---|
| England | 129 | 17.53% | 106 | 24 |
| Spain | 81 | 11.01% | 64 | 2 |
| Germany | 67 | 9.10% | 52 | 5 |
| Italy | 58 | 7.88% | 58 | 0 |
| France | 49 | 6.66% | 40 | 1 |
| Russia | 36 | 4.89% | 15 | 0 |
| Saudi Arabia | 30 | 4.08% | 10 | 0 |
| Mexico | 23 | 3.13% | 14 | 1 |
| Turkey | 22 | 2.99% | 22 | 0 |
| Others | 241 | 32.74% | 146 | 1 |
| **Total** | 736 | 100% | 527 | 34 |

- The England squad was made up entirely of players from the country's domestic league.
- The Belgium squad had the most players from a single foreign federation, with eleven players employed in England.
- Of the countries not represented by a national team at the World Cup, Italy's league provided the most squad members, with 58.
- Two squads (Senegal and Sweden) were made up entirely of players employed by overseas clubs. Senegal's league was also the only one of the participants' leagues that did not send any players to the tournament (players in the Swedish league represented Iceland, Iran and Costa Rica).
- Four squads had only one domestic-based player (Belgium, Iceland, Nigeria, and Switzerland).
- Only two players were from a third-tier league (Egypt's Sam Morsy of Wigan Athletic in England, and Panama's Ismael Díaz of Deportivo Fabril in Spain)

=== Player representation by club ===
Clubs with 10 or more players represented are listed.

| Club | Players |
|---|---|
| (England) Manchester City | 16 |
| (Spain) Real Madrid | 15 |
| (Spain) Barcelona | 14 |
| (France) Paris Saint-Germain | 12 |
| (England) Tottenham Hotspur | 12 |
| (Germany) Bayern Munich | 11 |
| (England) Chelsea | 11 |
| (Italy) Juventus | 11 |
| (England) Manchester United | 11 |

=== Player representation by club confederation ===
| Confederation | Players |
|---|---|
| UEFA | 543 |
| AFC | 82 |
| CONCACAF | 55 |
| CONMEBOL | 35 |
| CAF | 21 |
| OFC | 0 |

=== Coaches representation by country ===
Coaches in bold represented their own country.

| Number | Country | Coaches |
|---|---|---|
| 4 | Argentina | Héctor Cúper (Egypt), Ricardo Gareca (Peru), **Jorge Sampaoli**, José Pékerman (Colombia) |
| 3 | Spain | **Fernando Hierro**, Roberto Martínez (Belgium), Juan Antonio Pizzi (Saudi Arabia) |
| 2 | Colombia | Juan Carlos Osorio (Mexico), Hernán Darío Gómez (Panama) |
| 2 | France | **Didier Deschamps**, Hervé Renard (Morocco) |
| 2 | Germany | **Joachim Löw**, Gernot Rohr (Nigeria) |
| 2 | Portugal | Carlos Queiroz (Iran), **Fernando Santos** |
| 1 | Brazil | **Tite** |
| 1 | Costa Rica | **Óscar Ramírez** |
| 1 | Croatia | **Zlatko Dalić** |
| 1 | England | **Gareth Southgate** |
| 1 | Iceland | **Heimir Hallgrímsson** |
| 1 | Japan | **Akira Nishino** |
| 1 | Netherlands | Bert van Marwijk (Australia) |
| 1 | Norway | Åge Hareide (Denmark) |
| 1 | Poland | **Adam Nawałka** |
| 1 | Russia | **Stanislav Cherchesov** |
| 1 | Senegal | **Aliou Cissé** |
| 1 | Serbia | **Mladen Krstajić** |
| 1 | South Korea | **Shin Tae-yong** |
| 1 | Sweden | **Janne Andersson** |
| 1 | Bosnia and Herzegovina | Vladimir Petković (Switzerland) |
| 1 | Tunisia | **Nabil Maâloul** |
| 1 | Uruguay | **Óscar Tabárez** |
