= Kenner Gutiérrez =

Costa Rican footballer (born 1989)

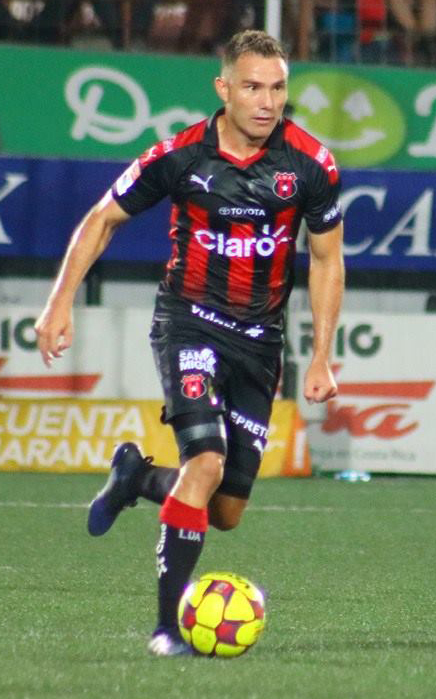
- Gutiérrez with Alajuelense in 2017

Personal information
- Full name: Kenner Gutiérrez Cerdas
- Date of birth: 9 June 1989 (age 37)
- Height: 1.78 m (5 ft 10 in)
- Position: Defender

Team information
- Current team: Santa Ana

Youth career
- Alajuelense

Senior career*
Years	Team	Apps	(Gls)
2009–2020	Alajuelense	251	(23)
2020–2022	Cartaginés	21	(1)
2022-2023	Xelajú	58	(5)
2024	Municipal Grecia	21	(3)
2024–2026	Puntarenas	60	(2)
2026–	Santa Ana	0	(0)

International career^{‡}
2009	Costa Rica U20	3	(0)
2017–2018	Costa Rica	9	(0)
- * Club domestic league appearances and goals as of April 12, 2021 ‡ National team caps and goals as of June 15, 2018

Kenner Gutiérrez Cerdas (born 9 June 1989) is a Costa Rican professional footballer who plays for Santa Ana as a defender.

== Career ==
He played for Costa Rica at the 2017 Copa Centroamericana and the 2017 CONCACAF Gold Cup. He was named among the standby players for the 2018 FIFA World Cup and was later called up to replace the injured Rónald Matarrita.

On July 1, 2020, after Liga Deportiva Alajuelense failed to win the league for the 13th consecutive time, it was announced that Gutiérrez would not have his contract renewed, after pressure from fans demanding the team let go of long-time players to make room for new ones.

== Career statistics ==
=== International ===
As of 22 June 2018

Costa Rica
Year	Apps	Goals
2017	9	0
2018	0	0
Total	9	0

== Honours ==
Alajuelense

- Primera División de Costa Rica: Apertura 2010, Apertura 2011, Clausura 2011, Apertura 2012

Xelajú

- Liga Nacional de Guatemala: Clausura 2023
