= A.D. Municipal Santa Ana =

Costa Rican football club

- Full name: Asociación Deportiva Municipal Santa Ana
- Founded: 1993; 33 years ago
- Ground: Estadio de Piedades de Santa Ana
- Capacity: 2,000
- Owner: Johan Salas
- Manager: Cristian Salomón
- League: Segunda División de Costa Rica
- Apertura 2025: 5°, Group B
- Website: https://santaanafutbolclub.com/

Santa Ana Fútbol Club is a Costa Rican football club, currently competing in the Segunda División de Costa Rica.

The team plays its home games in the Estadio de Piedades de Santa Ana in Santa Ana, San José, Costa Rica.

== History ==
It was founded in 1993 in the canton of Santa Ana in the province of San José after acquiring the Vecinos de Santa Ana franchise, a team that won the title of the First Division of LINAFA and achieved promotion to the Segunda División de Costa Rica for the 1993/94 season.

The team was in the Second Division of Costa Rica for 10 seasons until they were relegated in the 2002/03 season.

=== Season 2023−24 ===
Their greatest historical event comes in the Clausura 2024, where they were promoted to the Primera División for the first time. They finished fourth in group A, and, in the quarterfinals, they defeated Quepos Cambute 2−1. In the semifinals, they defeated Escorpiones 3–0 on aggregate, advancing to a Second Division final for the first time. In the final, they faced Jicaral, where in the first game they defeated them 3–0, and in the second game, they lost 2–1, but won on aggregate to win the Segunda División and be promoted to the highest category of Costa Rican football.

== Current squad ==
As of 28 August, 2024

Note: Flags indicate national team as defined under FIFA eligibility rules; some limited exceptions apply. Players may hold more than one non-FIFA nationality.

No.	Pos.	Nation	Player
1	GK	CRC	Patrick Pemberton
2	DF	CRC	Samir Taylor
3	DF	CRC	Johnny Acosta
4	DF	CUB	Dariel Morejón
5	MF	CRC	Luis Carlos Fallas
6	DF	CRC	José Salvatierra
7	MF	CRC	Esyin Cordero
8	MF	CRC	Johan Condega
9	FW	CRC	Nicolás Azofeifa
10	MF	CRC	Jonathan Martínez
11	MF	CRC	Andrés Torres
13	FW	CRC	Andy Reyes
15	FW	CRC	Adrián Chévez
16	FW	ARG	Jonathan Hansen
17	FW	CRC	Javier Camareno

No.	Pos.	Nation	Player
18	MF	CUB	Eduard Puga
19	FW	CRC	Gean Carlo Castro
21	MF	CRC	Fred Juárez
22	GK	NCA	Bryan Rodríguez
23	MF	HON	Jarret Forbes
24	FW	CRC	Jorman Sánchez
25	DF	CRC	Rudy Dawson
28	FW	CRC	Érick Zúñiga
29	FW	CRC	Vinicio Chavarría
39	MF	CRC	Mauricio Villalobos
70	MF	CRC	Bryan Astúa
77	MF	CRC	José Andrés González
98	DF	CRC	Randy Taylor
99	MF	CRC	Bryan Jiménez
