= Jhonny Acosta =

Costa Rican football player (born 1983)

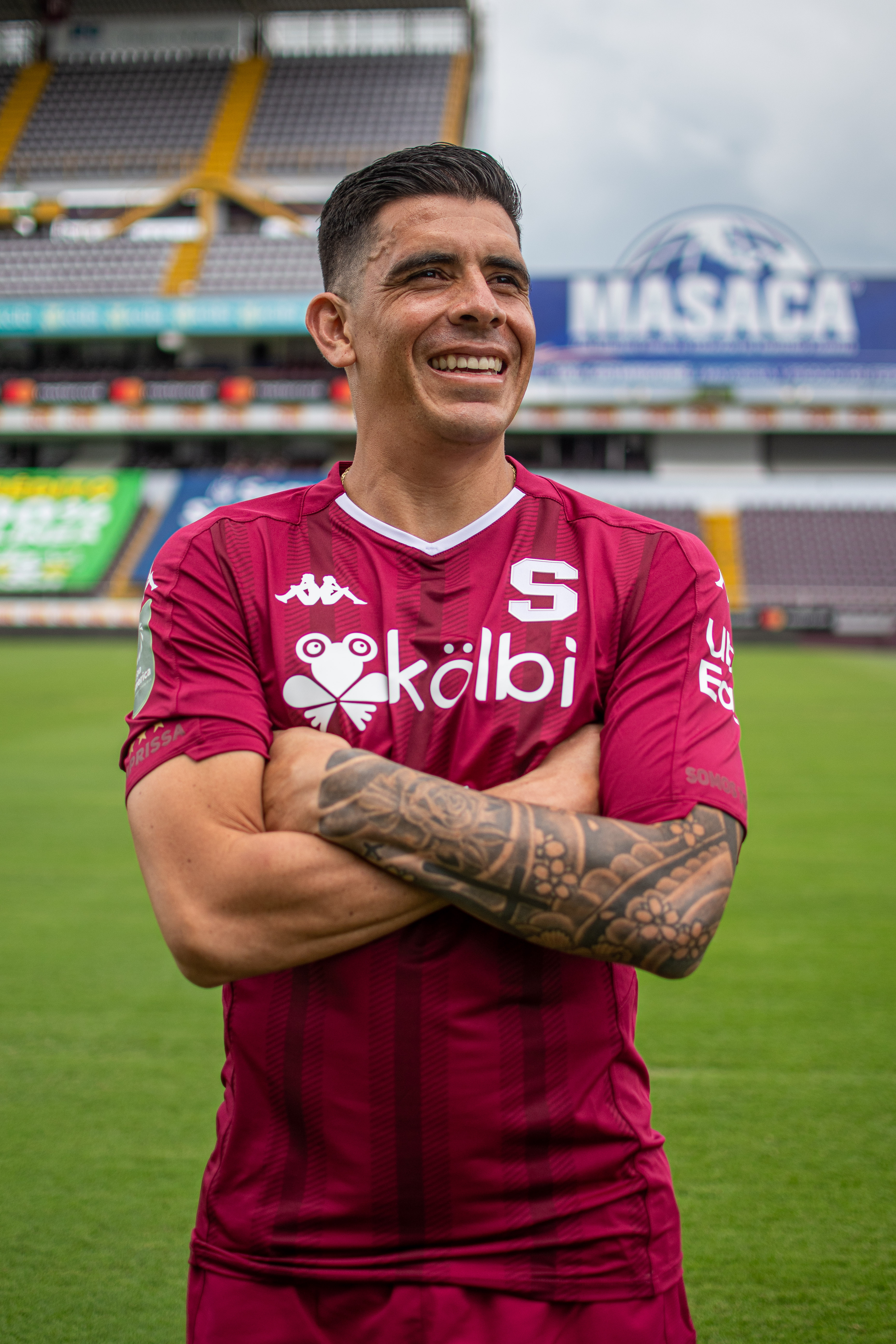
- Acosta being presented as a Saprissa player in 2020

Personal information
- Full name: Jhonny Acosta Zamora
- Date of birth: 21 July 1983 (age 43)
- Place of birth: Ciudad Quesada, Costa Rica
- Height: 1.76 m (5 ft 9 in)
- Position: Centre-back

Youth career
- Deportivo Saprissa

Senior career*
Years	Team	Apps	(Gls)
2004–2010	Santos de Guápiles	77	(0)
2010–2016	Alajuelense	192	(12)
2013	→ Dorados (loan)	10	(2)
2016–2018	Herediano	32	(4)
2018	Rionegro Águilas	15	(0)
2018–2019	East Bengal	21	(2)
2019–2020	UCR	15	(0)
2020	East Bengal	1	(0)
2020	Deportivo Saprissa	13	(1)
2021	Pérez Zeledón	8	(0)
2023–2025	Santa Ana	22	(2)
2025	Pitbulls	0	(0)

International career^{‡}
2011–2018	Costa Rica	71	(2)
- * Club domestic league appearances and goals as of 17 February 2021 (UTC) ‡ National team caps and goals as of 27 June 2018

Jhonny Acosta Zamora (born 21 July 1983) is a Costa Rican former professional footballer who played as a defender.

== Club career ==
Acosta made his professional debut for Santos de Guápiles in the 2004/05 season and left them in 2010 for Alajuelense with whom he won three league titles. In January 2013, he moved abroad to have a six-month loan spell at Mexican second division side Dorados.

On 8 September 2016, Acosta joined Herediano. On 29 November 2017, he renewed his contract for another year. On 10 January, he switched to Colombian club Rionegro Águilas.

=== East Bengal ===
On 11 July 2018, Acosta joined Indian club East Bengal Club for a fee of ₹1.36 crore (US$140,000). He was issued the number 2 jersey. On 2 September, he made his debut for the club and scored a goal in a 2–2 draw against Mohun Bagan in the Kolkata derby at the Salt Lake Stadium in Calcutta Football League. On 16 April 2019, he left the club.

On 26 June 2019, Acosta signed with Costa Rican club UCR. On 6 March 2020, he returned to East Bengal until the end of the season as a replacement for Liberian Ansumana Kromah.

== International career ==
A relatively late newcomer to the national team set-up, Acosta made his debut for Costa Rica in a March 2011 friendly match against Argentina, aged 27. He has represented his country in seven FIFA World Cup qualification matches and played at the 2011 CONCACAF Gold Cup and the 2011 Copa América. On 6 September 2013, he scored his first goal for Los Ticos in a 3–1 2014 FIFA World Cup qualifying victory against the United States in San José.

In June 2014, Acosta was included in Costa Rica's squad for the 2014 FIFA World Cup and made his debut in the competition during the round of 16 match against Greece as a substitute after the sending off of teammate Óscar Duarte. He was in the starting line-up for the quarter-final against the Netherlands, where he helped the team to a clean sheet in a 3–4 penalty shoot-out loss.

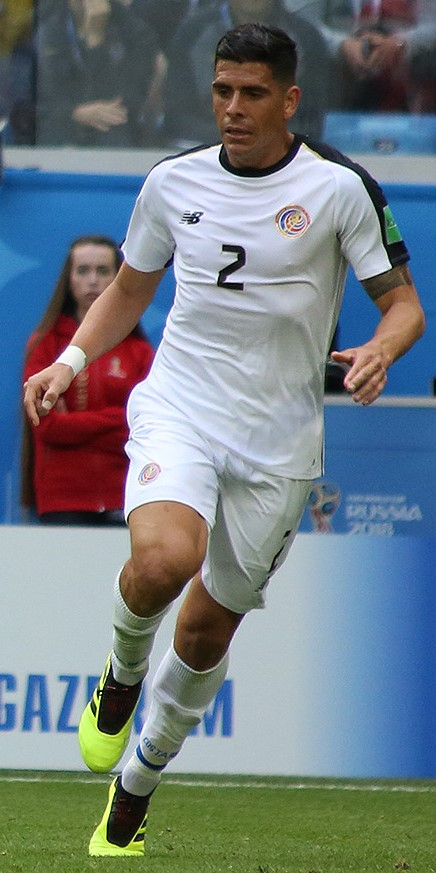
Acosta playing for Costa Rica at the 2018 FIFA World Cup

In May 2018, Acosta was named in Costa Rica's 23-man squad for the 2018 FIFA World Cup in Russia. He played the whole of the team's group stage matches against Brazil, Serbia and Switzerland.

== Career statistics ==
=== International ===
Statistics accurate as of match played 27 June 2018.

Costa Rica
Year	Apps	Goals
2011	12	0
2012	4	0
2013	7	1
2014	9	0
2015	6	0
2016	11	1
2017	15	0
2018	7	0
Total	71	2

Scores and results list Costa Rica's goal tally first.

No.	Date	Venue	Opponent	Score	Result	Competition
1.	6 September 2013	Estadio Nacional de Costa Rica, San José, Costa Rica	United States	1–0	3–1	2014 FIFA World Cup qualification
2.	26 March 2016	Independence Park, Kingston, Jamaica	Jamaica	1–1	1–1	2018 FIFA World Cup qualification
