= List of Belgian football transfers summer 2013 =

This is a list of Belgian football transfers for the 2013 summer transfer window. Only transfers involving a team from the Belgian Pro League are listed.

The summer transfer window will open on 1 July 2013, although some transfers took place prior to that date. Players without a club may join one at any time, either during or in between transfer windows. The transfer window ends on 2 September 2013, although a few completed transfers could still be announced a few days later.

== Sorted by date ==
=== January 2013 ===
Date	Name	Moving from	Moving to	Fee	Note
January 3, 2013	(Guinea) Zainoul Haidara	(Belgium) Bleid-Gaume	(Belgium) OH Leuven	Undisclosed	

=== April 2013 ===
Date	Name	Moving from	Moving to	Fee	Note
April 2, 2013	(Belgium) Jurgen Cavens	(Belgium) Waasland-Beveren	(Belgium) Cappellen	Undisclosed	
April 3, 2013	(Belgium) Hans Vanaken	(Belgium) Lommel United	(Belgium) Lokeren	Undisclosed	
April 9, 2013	(Belgium) Robin Henkens	(Belgium) Mechelen	(Belgium) Waasland-Beveren	Undisclosed	
April 10, 2013	(Belgium) Glenn Claes	(Belgium) Lierse	(Belgium) Mechelen	Free	
April 10, 2013	(Germany) Sören Ihssen	(Belgium) WS Woluwe	(Belgium) Mechelen	Free	
April 15, 2013	(Belgium) Kristof Lardenoit	(Belgium) Waasland-Beveren	(Belgium) Temse	Undisclosed	
April 17, 2013	(Ghana) Frank Acheampong	(Thailand) Buriram United	(Belgium) Anderlecht	1 000 000 €	(Note: Acheampong was already on loan from Buriram United to Anderlecht until the end of the 2012-13 season. Anderlecht chose to activate the clause that allowed them to complete a full transfer of Acheampong, paying 1 000 000 € to do so.)
April 19, 2013	(South Africa) Daylon Claasen	(Belgium) Lierse	Free Agent	Released	
April 19, 2013	(Venezuela) Christian Santos	(Belgium) Eupen	(Belgium) Waasland-Beveren	Undisclosed	
April 20, 2013	(Belgium) Bruno Godeau	(Belgium) Anderlecht	(Belgium) Zulte Waregem	Undisclosed	(Note: Godeau was already on loan from Anderlecht to Zulte Waregem until the end of the 2012-13 season. Zulte Waregem chose to activate the clause that allowed them to complete a full transfer of Godeau.)
April 23, 2013	(Belgium) Sebastien Dewaest	(Belgium) Roeselare	(Belgium) Charleroi	Undisclosed	
April 23, 2013	(Belgium) Kevin Janssens	(Belgium) Cercle Brugge	(Belgium) Eendracht Aalst	Free	
April 30, 2013	(Croatia) Hrvoje Čale	(Germany) VfL Wolfsburg	(Belgium) Waasland-Beveren	Free	

=== May 2013 ===
Date	Name	Moving from	Moving to	Fee	Note
May 1, 2013	(Belgium) Sam Vermeylen	(Belgium) Waasland-Beveren	(Belgium) Berchem	Undisclosed	
May 3, 2013	(France) Cédric Berthelin	(Belgium) Mons	(Belgium) Oostende	Undisclosed	
May 8, 2013	(Belgium) Lander Van Steenbrugghe	(Belgium) Oostende	(Belgium) Eendracht Aalst	Undisclosed	
May 9, 2013	(Belgium) Rachid Farssi	(Belgium) Waasland-Beveren	(Belgium) Lierse	Undisclosed	
May 10, 2013	(Belgium) David Hubert	(Belgium) Genk	(Belgium) Gent	Undisclosed	(Note: Hubert was already on loan from Anderlecht to Zulte Waregem until the end of the 2012-13 season. Genk, Gent and Hubert came to an agreement to make the transfer permanent.)
May 14, 2013	(Senegal) Jamal Thiaré	(Senegal) CNEPS Excellence	(Belgium) Charleroi	Undisclosed	(Note: Thiaré was already on loan from CNEPS Excellence to Charleroi until the end of the 2012-13 season and the transfer was now made permanent.)
May 15, 2013	(Belgium) Renaud Emond	(Belgium) Virton	(Belgium) Waasland-Beveren	Undisclosed	
May 15, 2013	(Greece) Spyros Fourlanos	(Greece) Panathinaikos	(Belgium) Club Brugge	Undisclosed	
May 21, 2013	(France) Teddy Chevalier	(Netherlands) RKC	(Belgium) Kortrijk	Undisclosed	
May 21, 2013	(Belgium) Denis Dessaer	(Belgium) WS Woluwe	(Belgium) Oostende	Undisclosed	
May 21, 2013	(Serbia) Stefan Mitrović	(Belgium) Kortrijk	(Portugal) Benfica	Undisclosed	
May 22, 2013	(Ukraine) Sacha Iakovenko	(Belgium) Anderlecht	(Italy) Fiorentina	Free	
May 23, 2013	(Montenegro) Mijuško Bojović	(Belgium) Charleroi	(Belgium) Waasland-Beveren	Undisclosed	
May 23, 2013	(France) Fayçal Lebbihi	(France) Grenoble	(Belgium) Waasland-Beveren	Undisclosed	
May 24, 2013	(Netherlands) Mitchell Braafhart	(Belgium) Cercle Brugge	Free Agent	Released	
May 24, 2013	(Ghana) Francis Dickoh	(Belgium) Cercle Brugge	Free Agent	Released	
May 24, 2013	(Belgium) Bernt Evens	(Belgium) Cercle Brugge	Free Agent	Released	
May 24, 2013	(Portugal) Elton Monteiro	(England) Arsenal Academy	(Belgium) Club Brugge	Undisclosed	
May 24, 2013	(Belgium) Anthony Portier	(Belgium) Cercle Brugge	Free Agent	Released	
May 24, 2013	(China) Wang Yang	(Belgium) Cercle Brugge	Free Agent	Released	
May 27, 2013	(Belgium) Colin Coosemans	(Belgium) Club Brugge	(Belgium) Waasland-Beveren	Undisclosed	(Note: Coosemans was already on loan from Club Brugge to Waasland-Beveren until the end of the 2012-13 season. Both clubs agreed to make the transfer permanent.)
May 27, 2013	(Belgium) Kenny Steppe	(Netherlands) Heerenveen	(Belgium) Waasland-Beveren	Free	
May 28, 2013	(Morocco) Soufiane Bidaoui	(Belgium) Lierse	(Italy) Parma	Free	
May 28, 2013	(Belgium) Jimmy Hempte	(Netherlands) Roda JC	(Belgium) Oostende	Undisclosed	
May 28, 2013	(Belgium) David Wijns	(Belgium) Kortrijk	(Belgium) OH Leuven	Undisclosed	
May 30, 2013	(Australia) Mathew Ryan	(Australia) Central Coast Mariners	(Belgium) Club Brugge	A$180,000	

=== End of 2012–13 season ===
After the end of the 2012–13 season, several players will return from loan to another club or will not have their contracts extended. These will be listed here, together with other players for which the date is also not specified.

Date	Name	Moving from	Moving to	Fee	Note
End of 2012–13 season	(Saudi Arabia) Mazin Ahmed Al-Huthayfi	(Belgium) OH Leuven	Undisclosed	Undisclosed	
End of 2012–13 season	(Bolivia) Vicente Arze	(Iran) Esteghlal	(Belgium) Charleroi	Loan Return	
End of 2012–13 season	(Israel) Barak Badash	(Belgium) Waasland-Beveren	(Israel) Ironi Kiryat Shmona	Loan Return	
End of 2012–13 season	(Uruguay) Joaquín Boghossian	(Belgium) Cercle Brugge	(Austria) Salzburg	Loan Return	
End of 2012–13 season	(Germany) Viktor Bopp	(Belgium) Charleroi	Free Agent	Released Bopp	
End of 2012–13 season	(Tunisia) Fabien Camus	(France) Troyes	(Belgium) Genk	Loan Return	
End of 2012–13 season	(Portugal) William Carvalho	(Belgium) Cercle Brugge	(Portugal) Sporting	Loan Return	
End of 2012–13 season	(Peru) Carlo Chueca	(Belgium) Mons	Free Agent	Released	
End of 2012–13 season	(Guinea) Ibrahima Conté	(Belgium) Gent	(Belgium) Zulte Waregem	Undisclosed	(Note: Conté was already on loan from Gent to Zulte Waregem during the second half of the 2012-13 season. Zulte Waregem chose to activate the clause that allowed them to complete a full transfer of Conté.)
End of 2012–13 season	(Belgium) Daniel Cruz	(Belgium) Waasland-Beveren	Free Agent	NA	
End of 2012–13 season	(Belgium) Alves Da Silva	(Belgium) Waasland-Beveren	Free Agent	NA	
End of 2012–13 season	(France) Matthieu Debisschop	(Belgium) Mons	Free Agent	Released	
End of 2012–13 season	(Belgium) Emmerik De Vriese	(Belgium) OH Leuven	Free Agent	NA	
End of 2012–13 season	(France) Sébastien Didier	(Belgium) Waasland-Beveren	Free Agent	Released	
End of 2012–13 season	(Slovenia) Elvedin Džinić	(Belgium) Charleroi	(Bulgaria) Botev Plovdiv	Undisclosed	
End of 2012–13 season	(Israel) Mohammad Ghadir	(Belgium) Waasland-Beveren	(Israel) Maccabi Haifa	Loan Return	
End of 2012–13 season	(Belgium) Yassine El Ghanassy	(Netherlands) Heerenveen	(Belgium) Gent	Loan Return	
End of 2012–13 season	(Belgium) Samuel Fabris	(Belgium) Charleroi	(Belgium) WS Brussels	Released	
End of 2012–13 season	(France) Harlem Gnohéré	(Belgium) Westerlo	(Belgium) Charleroi	Loan Return	
End of 2012–13 season	(Central African Republic) Habib Habibou	(England) Leeds	(Belgium) Zulte Waregem	Loan Return	
End of 2012–13 season	(Belgium) Jonas Ivens	(Belgium) Waasland-Beveren	(Netherlands) Groningen	Loan Return	
End of 2012–13 season	(Serbia) Milan Jovanović	(Belgium) Anderlecht	Free Agent	Released	
End of 2012–13 season	(Belgium) Grégory Lazitch	(Belgium) Charleroi	(Belgium) WS Brussels	Released	
End of 2012–13 season	(Brazil) Leandro	(Belgium) Charleroi	Free Agent	Released	
End of 2012–13 season	(Egypt) Essam Mahmoud	(Belgium) Lierse	(Egypt) Wadi Degla	Loan Return	
End of 2012–13 season	(Spain) Melli	(Belgium) Gent	Free Agent	Released	
End of 2012–13 season	(Senegal) Alain Mendy	(Belgium) Waasland-Beveren	Free Agent	Released	
End of 2012–13 season	(Israel) Matan Ohayon	(Belgium) Charleroi	(Israel) Ironi Kiryat Shmona	Undisclosed	
End of 2012–13 season	(Netherlands) Glynor Plet	(Belgium) Genk	(Netherlands) Twente	Loan Return	
End of 2012–13 season	(Belgium) Quentin Pottiez	(Belgium) Mons	Free Agent	Released	
End of 2012–13 season	(Egypt) Ahmed Said	(Belgium) Lierse	(Egypt) Wadi Degla	Loan Return	
End of 2012–13 season	(France) Mikael Seoudi	(Belgium) Waasland-Beveren	(Belgium) RWDM Brussels	Loan	
End of 2012–13 season	(Israel) Gal Shish	(Belgium) Waasland-Beveren	Free Agent	NA	
End of 2012–13 season	(Belgium) Wesley Sonck	(Belgium) Waasland-Beveren	Free Agent	NA	
End of 2012–13 season	(Belgium) Bryan Verboom	(Belgium) Anderlecht	(Belgium) Zulte Waregem	Undisclosed	(Note: Verboom was already on loan from Anderlecht to Zulte Waregem during the 2012-13 season. Zulte Waregem chose to activate the clause that allowed them to complete a full transfer of Verboom.)
End of 2012–13 season	(Brazil) Wallace	(Belgium) Gent	Free Agent	Released	
End of 2012–13 season	(Poland) Marcin Wasilewski	(Belgium) Anderlecht	Free Agent	Released	

=== June 2013 ===
Date	Name	Moving from	Moving to	Fee	Note
June 1, 2013	(Italy) Alessandro Iandoli	(Belgium) Sint-Truiden	(Belgium) Standard Liège	Loan	(Note: Iandoli was on loan from Sint-Truiden to Újpest during the 2012-13 season. The loan ended and now Iandoli was loaned to Standard Liège.)
June 2, 2013	(Montenegro) Žarko Tomašević	(Serbia) Partizan Belgrade	(Belgium) Kortrijk	Undisclosed	
June 4, 2013	(Portugal) Yohan Tavares	(Belgium) Standard Liège	(Italy) Chievo	Undisclosed	(Note: Tavares was on loan from Standard Liège to Estoril during the second half of the 2012-13 season. The loan ended and now Tavares was sold to Chievo.)
June 5, 2013	(Ghana) Nana Asare	(Netherlands) Utrecht	(Belgium) Gent	Undisclosed	
June 5, 2013	(Morocco) Hassan El Mouataz	(Belgium) Lokeren	Free Agent	Released	
June 5, 2013	(Croatia) Paolo Grbac	(Belgium) Lokeren	Free Agent	Released	
June 5, 2013	(Senegal) Ibrahima Gueye	(Belgium) Lokeren	Free Agent	Released	
June 5, 2013	(Democratic Republic of the Congo) Tiko	(Belgium) Lokeren	Free Agent	Released	
June 6, 2013	(Netherlands) Ryan Donk	(Belgium) Club Brugge	(Turkey) Kasımpaşa	Undisclosed	
June 6, 2013	(Nigeria) Abayomi Owonikoko	(Georgia (country)) Gagra	(Belgium) Lokeren	Undisclosed	
June 6, 2013	(Belgium) Kevin Roelandts	(Belgium) OH Leuven	(Belgium) Maldegem	Free	(Note: Roelandts was on loan from OH Leuven to Antwerp during the 2012-13 season. The loan ended and Roelandts was released to Maldegem.)
June 10, 2013	(Luxembourg) Maxime Chanot	(Belgium) Beerschot	(Belgium) Kortrijk	Free	
June 10, 2013	(France) Jérémy Perbet	(Belgium) Mons	(Spain) Villarreal	Undisclosed	(Note: Perbet was already on loan from Mons to Villarreal until the end of the 2012-13 season. Villarreal chose to activate the clause that allowed them to complete a full transfer of Perbet.)
June 10, 2013	(Belgium) Miguel Vandamme	(Belgium) Maldegem	(Belgium) Cercle Brugge	Undisclosed	
June 11, 2013	(Serbia) Bojan Jorgačević	(Belgium) Club Brugge	(Turkey) Kayseri Erciyesspor	Undisclosed	
June 12, 2013	(Nigeria) Chimezie Mbah	(Israel) Hakoah Amidar Ramat Gan	(Belgium) Waasland-Beveren	Undisclosed	
June 12, 2013	(Israel) Rami Gershon	(Belgium) Standard Liège	(Belgium) Waasland-Beveren	Undisclosed	(Note: Gershon was on loan from Standard Liège to Celtic during the second half of the 2012-13 season. The loan ended and Gershon was sold to Waasland-Beveren.)
June 12, 2013	(Belgium) Joachim Mununga	(Belgium) Beerschot	(Belgium) Mons	Free	
June 12, 2013	(Belgium) Timmy Simons	(Germany) 1. FC Nürnberg	(Belgium) Club Brugge	Undisclosed	
June 12, 2013	(Belgium) Jannes Vansteenkiste	(Belgium) Club Brugge	(Belgium) Antwerp	Undisclosed	
June 13, 2013	(Central African Republic) Evans Kondogbia	(Belgium) RFC Liège	(Belgium) Charleroi	Undisclosed	
June 13, 2013	(Turkey) Alpaslan Öztürk	(Belgium) Beerschot	(Belgium) Standard Liège	Free	
June 13, 2013	(Belgium) Tom van Imschoot	(Belgium) Mons	(Belgium) Oostende	Undisclosed	
June 13, 2013	(Belgium) Davino Verhulst	(Belgium) Sint-Truiden	(Belgium) Lokeren	Undisclosed	
June 13, 2013	(France) Steeven Willems	(France) Lille	(Belgium) Charleroi	Undisclosed	
June 14, 2013	(Senegal) Mansour Diop	(Belgium) Zulte Waregem	(Belgium) WS Brussels	Loan	
June 14, 2013	(Belgium) Nicky Hayen	(Belgium) OH Leuven	(Belgium) Dender EH	Free	(Note: Hayen was on loan from OH Leuven to Antwerp during the 2012-13 season. The loan ended and Hayen was released to Dender EH where he became player-coach.)
June 14, 2013	(Argentina) Hernán Losada	(Belgium) Beerschot	(Belgium) Lierse	Free	
June 14, 2013	(Israel) Hanan Maman	(Israel) Hapoel Haifa	(Belgium) Waasland-Beveren	Undisclosed	(Note: Maman was on loan from Hapoel Haifa to Hapoel Tel Aviv during the 2012-13 season. The loan ended and Maman was sold to Waasland-Beveren.)
June 14, 2013	(Senegal) Elhadji Ndoye	(Belgium) Zulte Waregem	(Belgium) WS Brussels	Loan	
June 14, 2013	(Belgium) Leandro Trossard	(Belgium) Genk	(Belgium) Westerlo	Loan	(Note: Trossard was on loan from Genk to Lommel United during the second half of the 2012-13 season. The loan ended, but Trossard was now loaned to Westerlo.)
June 14, 2013	(Belgium) Thibaut Van Acker	(Belgium) Club Brugge	(Belgium) Cercle Brugge	Undisclosed	(Note: Van Acker was on loan from Club Brugge to Beerschot during the second half of the 2012-13 season. The loan ended and Van Acker was sold to Cercle Brugge.)
June 14, 2013	(Spain) Fede Vico	(Spain) Córdoba	(Belgium) Anderlecht	Undisclosed	
June 15, 2013	(Belgium) Brahim Barmaki	(Belgium) Mons	(Belgium) WS Brussels	Undisclosed	
June 15, 2013	(Greece) Stergos Marinos	(Greece) Panathinaikos	(Belgium) Charleroi	Undisclosed	
June 15, 2013	(Croatia) Ivan Santini	(Croatia) Zadar	(Belgium) Kortrijk	Undisclosed	(Note: Santini was on loan from Zadar to Freiburg during the second half of the 2011-12 season and the whole 2012-13 season. The loan ended and Santini was sold to Kortrijk.)
June 15, 2013	(Belgium) Georgiy Zhukov	(Belgium) Beerschot	(Belgium) Standard Liège	Free	
June 16, 2013	(Belgium) Salvatore Crimi	(France) Lille	(Belgium) Zulte Waregem	Undisclosed	
June 16, 2013	(Senegal) Mohamed Daf	(Belgium) Anderlecht	(Belgium) Charleroi	Undisclosed	
June 16, 2013	(France) Frédéric Duplus	(France) Sochaux	(Belgium) Zulte Waregem	Free	
June 16, 2013	(Palestine) Omar Jarun	(Belgium) Charleroi	Free Agent	Released	
June 16, 2013	(Belgium) Ilias Maatoug	(Belgium) WS Brussels	(Belgium) Zulte Waregem	Loan	
June 16, 2013	(Montenegro) Danilo Sarkić	(France) Sochaux	(Belgium) Zulte Waregem	Undisclosed	
June 17, 2013	(Netherlands) Albian Muzaqi	(Netherlands) PSV	(Belgium) Genk	Undisclosed	
June 17, 2013	(Belgium) Denis Odoi	(Belgium) Anderlecht	(Belgium) Lokeren	Undisclosed	
June 17, 2013	(Belgium) Jordan Remacle	(Belgium) Gent	(Belgium) Lokeren	Undisclosed	(Note: Remacle was on loan from Gent to Waasland-Beveren during the second half of the 2012-13 season. The loan ended and Remacle was sold to Lokeren.)
June 19, 2013	(Belgium) Stijn De Smet	(Belgium) Gent	(Belgium) Kortrijk	Undisclosed	(Note: De Smet was on loan from Gent to Waasland-Beveren during the second half of the 2012-13 season. The loan ended and De Smet was sold to Kortrijk.)
June 19, 2013	(Belgium) Benito Raman	(Belgium) Gent	(Belgium) Kortrijk	Loan	(Note: Raman was on loan from Gent to Beerschot during the second half of the 2012-13 season. The loan ended but Raman was now loaned to Kortrijk.)
June 20, 2013	(Belgium) Mohamed Messoudi	(Belgium) Gent	(Belgium) OH Leuven	Undisclosed	
June 20, 2013	(Brazil) Wamberto	(Belgium) Beerschot	(Belgium) Lierse	Free	
June 21, 2013	(France) Jonathan Delaplace	(Belgium) Zulte Waregem	(France) Lille	Undisclosed	
June 21, 2013	(Democratic Republic of the Congo) Dieumerci Mbokani	(Belgium) Anderlecht	(Ukraine) Dynamo Kyiv	Undisclosed	
June 21, 2013	(Sweden) Behrang Safari	(Belgium) Anderlecht	(Switzerland) Basel	Undisclosed	
June 24, 2013	(Brazil) Renato Neto	(Portugal) Sporting	(Belgium) Gent	Loan	(Note: Neto was already on loan from Sporting to Gent during the second half of the 2012-13 season. The loan ended, but Gent and Sporting agreed to renew the loan deal, allowing Neto to spend another full season in Ghent.)
June 24, 2013	(Belgium) Björn Vleminckx	(Belgium) Club Brugge	(Turkey) Kayseri Erciyesspor	Undisclosed	(Note: Vleminckx was on loan from Club Brugge to Gençlerbirliği during the second half of the 2012-13 season. The loan ended, but now Vleminckx was sold to Erciyesspor.)
June 25, 2013	(Israel) Elyaniv Barda	(Belgium) Genk	(Israel) Hapoel Be'er Sheva	Free	
June 25, 2013	(Belgium) Dorian Dessoleil	(Belgium) Charleroi	(Belgium) Sint-Truiden	Undisclosed	
June 25, 2013	(Belgium) Laurent Henkinet	(Belgium) Standard Liège	(Belgium) Sint-Truiden	Loan	(Note: Henkinet was on loan from Standard Liège to Dessel Sport during the 2012-13 season. The loan ended, but now Henkinet was loaned to Sint-Truiden.)
June 25, 2013	(Poland) Seweryn Michalski	(Poland) Bełchatów	(Belgium) Mechelen	Undisclosed	
June 26, 2013	(Belgium) Jimmy De Jonghe	(Belgium) Club Brugge	(Belgium) Lierse	Loan	(Note: De Jonghe was on loan from Club Brugge to Zulte Waregem during the 2012-13 season. The loan ended, but now De Jonghe was loaned to Lierse.)
June 26, 2013	(Uruguay) Carlos Diogo	(Spain) Huesca	(Belgium) Gent	Undisclosed	
June 26, 2013	(Cameroon) Gaël Etock	(Portugal) Sporting	(Belgium) Cercle Brugge	Undisclosed	
June 26, 2013	(Belgium) Thomas Foket	(Belgium) Gent	(Belgium) Oostende	Loan	
June 26, 2013	(Cameroon) Christian Pouga	(Belgium) OH Leuven	(Turkey) Ankaraspor	Undisclosed	(Note: Pouga was on loan from OH Leuven to Lierse during the second half of the 2012-13 season. The loan ended, but now Pouga was sold to Ankaraspor.)
June 27, 2013	(France) Frédéric Brillant	(Belgium) Beerschot	(Belgium) Oostende	Free	
June 27, 2013	(Belgium) Sepp De Roover	(Belgium) Lokeren	(Netherlands) NAC	Undisclosed	(Note: De Roover was already on loan from Lokeren to NAC during the 2012-13 season. Both clubs agreed to make the deal permanent.)
June 27, 2013	(Belgium) Seydina Diarra	(Belgium) Anderlecht	(Netherlands) NEC	Undisclosed	
June 27, 2013	(France) Damien Marcq	(France) Caen	(Belgium) Charleroi	Undisclosed	(Note: Marcq was on loan from Caen to Sedan during the 2012-13 season. The loan deal ended and Marcq was sold to Charleroi.)
June 28, 2013	(Spain) Jordan Garcia-Calvete	(Belgium) Anderlecht	(Netherlands) De Graafschap	Undisclosed	(Note: Garcia-Calvete was already on loan from Anderlecht to De Graafschap during the 2012-13 season. Both clubs agreed to make the deal permanent.)
June 28, 2013	(Denmark) Nicklas Pedersen	(Belgium) Mechelen	(Belgium) Gent	Undisclosed	
June 28, 2013	(Belgium) Olivier Renard	(Belgium) Mechelen	(Belgium) Charleroi	Loan	
June 29, 2013	(Egypt) Ahmed Abou Moslem	(Belgium) Lierse	Free Agent	Released	
June 29, 2013	(Belgium) Christian Brüls	(Belgium) Gent	(France) Nice	Loan	
June 29, 2013	(Egypt) Mohamed El-Gabbas	(Belgium) Lierse	Free Agent	Released	
June 29, 2013	(Belgium) Lionel Gendarme	(Belgium) Oostende	(Belgium) Union SG	Undisclosed	
June 29, 2013	(Egypt) Mostafa Shebeita	(Belgium) Lierse	(Egypt) Wadi Degla	Loan Return	
June 29, 2013	(Belgium) Jamaïque Vandamme	(Belgium) Oostende	(Belgium) Union SG	Undisclosed	
June 29, 2013	(Belgium) Steven Verheyen	(Belgium) Beerschot	(Belgium) Lierse	Free	

=== July 2013 ===
Date	Name	Moving from	Moving to	Fee	Note
July 1, 2013	(Belgium) Frederik Boi	(Belgium) OH Leuven	(Belgium) Cercle Brugge	Free	(Note: Boi was already on loan from OH Leuven to Cercle Brugge during the second half of the 2012-13 season. The loan and his contract with OH Leuven ended, allowing Boi to move to Cercle for free.)
July 1, 2013	(Belgium) Jonas De Roeck	(Belgium) OH Leuven	(Belgium) Antwerp	Free	
July 2, 2013	(Slovakia) Róbert Demjan	(Poland) Bielsko-Biała	(Belgium) Waasland-Beveren	Undisclosed	
July 2, 2013	(Egypt) Hossam Ghaly	(Egypt) Al Ahly	(Belgium) Lierse	Undisclosed	
July 2, 2013	(Sweden) Tom Pettersson	(Sweden) Åtvidaberg	(Belgium) OH Leuven	Loan	
July 3, 2013	(Serbia) Miloš Marić	(Belgium) Lokeren	(Belgium) Waasland-Beveren	Undisclosed	
July 3, 2013	(Greece) Michalis Sifakis	(Belgium) Charleroi	(Greece) Atromitos	Undisclosed	
July 4, 2013	(Belgium) René Sterckx	(Belgium) Anderlecht	(Belgium) Waasland-Beveren	Undisclosed	(Note: Sterckx was already on loan from Anderlecht to Waasland-Beveren during the second half of the 2012-13 season. Both clubs agreed to make the transfer permanent.)
July 4, 2013	(Belgium) Franco Zennaro	(Belgium) Standard Liège	(Netherlands) Fortuna Sittard	Loan	(Note: Zennaro was on loan from Standard to Waasland-Beveren during the 2012-13 season. The loan ended but now Zennaro was loaned to Fortuna Sittard.)
July 5, 2013	(Serbia) Djordje Despotović	(Serbia) Spartak Subotica	(Belgium) Lokeren	Undisclosed	
July 5, 2013	(Cameroon) Ernest Nfor	(Belgium) Kortrijk	Free Agent	Released	
July 5, 2013	(Belgium) Koen Weuts	(Belgium) OH Leuven	(Netherlands) Helmond Sport	Free	
July 6, 2013	(Democratic Republic of the Congo) Junior Kabananga	(Belgium) Anderlecht	(Belgium) Cercle Brugge	Undisclosed	(Note: Kabananga was on loan from Anderlecht to Roeselare during the 2012-13 season. The loan ended and Kabananga was sold to Cercle Brugge.)
July 8, 2013	(Belgium) Igor de Camargo	(Germany) Borussia Mönchengladbach	(Belgium) Standard Liège	Undisclosed	(Note: De Camargo was on loan from Mönchengladbach to TSG Hoffenheim during the 2012-13 season. The loan ended and De Camargo was sold to Standard.)
July 10, 2013	(Colombia) Carlos Bacca	(Belgium) Club Brugge	(Spain) Sevilla	Undisclosed	
July 10, 2013	(Belgium) Ward Stubbe	(Belgium) Cercle Brugge	(Belgium) Torhout	Loan	
July 10, 2013	(Bosnia and Herzegovina) Muhamed Subašić	(Bosnia and Herzegovina) Olimpic Sarajevo	(Belgium) OH Leuven	Loan	(Note: Subašić was on loan from Olimpic Sarajevo to Dynamo Dresden during the 2012-13 season. He was now loaned to OH Leuven.)
July 11, 2013	(Israel) Shlomi Arbeitman	(Belgium) Gent	(Belgium) Mons	Undisclosed	(Note: Arbeitman was already on loan from Gent to Mons during the second half of the 2012-13 season. The clubs agreed top make the deal permanent.)
July 11, 2013	(Belgium) Benjamin Mokulu	(Belgium) Lokeren	(Belgium) Mechelen	Undisclosed	
July 11, 2013	(Guinea) Obbi Oulare	(France) Lille	(Belgium) Club Brugge	Undisclosed	
July 12, 2013	(Belgium) Bart Buysse	(Belgium) Club Brugge	(Belgium) Cercle Brugge	Undisclosed	
July 13, 2013	(Belgium) Marvin Ogunjimi	(Spain) Mallorca	(Belgium) OH Leuven	Loan	(Note: Ogunjimi was on loan from Mallorca to Beerschot during the second half of the 2012-13 season. Ogunjimi was now loaned to OH Leuven.)
July 13, 2013	(China) Wang Shangyuan	Free Agent	(Belgium) Club Brugge	NA	
July 14, 2013	(Belgium) Tom De Sutter	(Belgium) Anderlecht	(Belgium) Club Brugge	Undisclosed	
July 15, 2013	(Brazil) Bruno	Undisclosed	(Belgium) Lierse	Undisclosed	
July 15, 2013	(Belgium) Thorgan Hazard	(England) Chelsea	(Belgium) Zulte Waregem	Loan	(Note: Hazard was already on loan from Chelsea to Zulte Waregem during the 2012-13 season. Both clubs agreed to extend the loan deal.)
July 15, 2013	(Estonia) Enar Jääger	(Norway) Aalesund	(Belgium) Lierse	Undisclosed	
July 15, 2013	(Brazil) Douglas Maia	Free Agent	(Belgium) OH Leuven	NA	
July 15, 2013	(Sweden) Viktor Prodell	(Sweden) Åtvidaberg	(Belgium) Mechelen	Undisclosed	
July 15, 2013	(Israel) Yuval Spungin	(Cyprus) Omonia	(Belgium) Mons	Undisclosed	
July 15, 2013	(Egypt) Ahmed Yasser	(Egypt) Wadi Degla	(Belgium) Lierse	Undisclosed	(Note: Yasser was on loan from Wadi Degla to Turnhout during the second half of the 2012-13 season. The loan ended and Yasser was sold to Lierse.)
July 16, 2013	(Nigeria) Chuka	(Belgium) OH Leuven	(Romania) CFR Cluj	Undisclosed	
July 16, 2013	(Belgium) Wouter Corstjens	(Belgium) Gent	(Belgium) Lierse	Loan	(Note: Corstjens was on loan from Gent to Westerlo during the second half of the 2012-13 season. The loan ended, but now Corstjens was loaned to Lierse.)
July 17, 2013	(Sweden) Michael Almebäck	(Belgium) Club Brugge	(Denmark) Brøndby	Undisclosed	
July 17, 2013	(Argentina) Pablo Chavarría	(Belgium) Anderlecht	(France) Lens	Undisclosed	(Note: Chavarría was on loan from Anderlecht to Kortrijk during the 2012-13 season. The loan ended and Chavarría was sold to Lens.)
July 17, 2013	(Belgium) Maxime Gunst	(Belgium) Club Brugge	(Netherlands) FC Eindhoven	Undisclosed	(Note: Gunst was on loan from Club Brugge to Eendracht Aalst during the 2012-13 season. The loan ended and Gunst was sold to FC Eindhoven.)
July 17, 2013	(Croatia) Tomislav Mikulić	(Belgium) OH Leuven	(Greece) Panthrakikos	Free	
July 18, 2013	(Belgium) Ziguy Badibanga	(Belgium) Anderlecht	(Greece) Ergotelis	Undisclosed	(Note: Badibanga was on loan from Anderlecht to Charleroi during the 2012-13 season. The loan ended and Badibanga was sold to Ergotelis.)
July 18, 2013	(Netherlands) Demy de Zeeuw	(Russia) Spartak Moscow	(Belgium) Anderlecht	Loan	(Note: De Zeeuw was already on loan from Spartak Moscow to Anderlecht during the second half of the 2012-13 season. The clubs agreed to extend the loan deal.)
July 18, 2013	(Hungary) Roland Juhász	(Belgium) Anderlecht	(Hungary) Videoton	Undisclosed	(Note: Juhász was already on loan from Anderlecht to Videoton during the second half of the 2012-13 season. The clubs agreed top make the deal permanent.)
July 18, 2013	(Mali) Mamoutou N'Diaye	(Belgium) Gent	(Belgium) Zulte Waregem	Undisclosed	
July 20, 2013	(France) Nicolas Godemèche	(Romania) CFR Cluj	(Belgium) Waasland-Beveren	Undisclosed	
July 20, 2013	(Netherlands) Robert Klaasen	(Netherlands) AZ	(Belgium) Kortrijk	Undisclosed	
July 20, 2013	(Belgium) Jérémy Serwy	(Belgium) Zulte Waregem	(Germany) Dortmund B	Undisclosed	(Note: Serwy was on loan from Zulte Waregem to WS Woluwe during the second half of the 2012-13 season. The loan ended and Serwy was sold to Dortmund B.)
July 20, 2013	(North Macedonia) Ivan Tričkovski	(Belgium) Club Brugge	(Belgium) Waasland-Beveren	Loan	
July 20, 2013	(Serbia) Dalibor Veselinović	(Belgium) Anderlecht	(Belgium) Waasland-Beveren	Loan	(Note: Veselinović was on loan from Anderlecht to Beerschot during the 2012-13 season. The loan ended and Veselinović was now loaned to Waasland-Beveren.)
July 21, 2013	(France) Julien Toudic	(France) Lens	(Belgium) Zulte Waregem	Undisclosed	(Note: Toudic was on loan from Lens to Reims during the 2012-13 season. The loan ended and Toudic was now sold to Zulte Waregem.)
July 22, 2013	(Spain) Jordi Figueras	(Belgium) Club Brugge	(Spain) Betis Sevilla	Undisclosed	(Note: Figueras was on loan from Club Brugge to Rayo Vallecano during the second half of the 2012-13 season. The loan ended and Figueras was now sold to Betis Sevilla.)
July 23, 2013	(Ukraine) Igor Berezovsky	(Poland) Legia Warsaw	(Belgium) Lierse	Undisclosed	
July 23, 2013	(Bosnia and Herzegovina) Armin Čerimagić	(Belgium) Gent	(Belgium) Eendracht Aalst	Loan	(Note: Čerimagić was already on loan from Gent to Eendracht Aalst during the second half of the 2012-13 season. The clubs agreed to extend the loan deal for another season.)
July 23, 2013	(Colombia) Jaime Alfonso Ruiz	(Belgium) Mechelen	(Belgium) Westerlo	Undisclosed	
July 24, 2013	(Israel) Tal Ben Haim	(England) Queens Park Rangers	(Belgium) Standard Liège	Free	
July 24, 2013	(Argentina) Lucas Biglia	(Belgium) Anderlecht	(Italy) Lazio	Undisclosed	
July 24, 2013	(Portugal) Rudy	(Belgium) Cercle Brugge	(Spain) Deportivo La Coruña	Undisclosed	
July 25, 2013	(Bulgaria) Ivan Bandalovski	(Bulgaria) CSKA Sofia	(Belgium) OH Leuven	Undisclosed	
July 26, 2013	(Netherlands) Jordan Botaka	(Belgium) Club Brugge	(Netherlands) Excelsior	Undisclosed	(Note: Botaka was on loan from Club Brugge to Belenenses during the 2012-13 season. The loan ended and Botaka was sold to Excelsior.)
July 26, 2013	(Netherlands) Joey Godee	(Belgium) Cercle Brugge	(Netherlands) Go Ahead Eagles	Loan	
July 26, 2013	(Serbia) Luka Milivojević	(Serbia) Red Star Belgrade	(Belgium) Anderlecht	Undisclosed	
July 29, 2013	(Poland) Grzegorz Sandomierski	(Belgium) Genk	(Croatia) Dinamo Zagreb	Loan	(Note: Sandomierski was on loan from Genk to Blackburn Rovers during the 2012-13 season. The loan ended and Sandomierski was now loaned to Dinamo Zagreb.)
July 29, 2013	(France) Yohann Thuram-Ulien	(France) Troyes	(Belgium) Standard Liège	Undisclosed	
July 30, 2013	(Turkey) Sinan Bolat	(Belgium) Standard Liège	(Portugal) Porto	Free	
July 30, 2013	(Argentina) Leandro González Pirez	(Argentina) River Plate	(Belgium) Gent	Loan	
July 30, 2013	(Netherlands) Ronnie Stam	(England) Wigan	(Belgium) Standard Liège	Undisclosed	
July 31, 2013	(Belgium) Loris Brogno	(Belgium) OH Leuven	(Belgium) Lommel United	Loan	
July 31, 2013	(France) Kévin Dupuis	(Belgium) Kortrijk	(France) Châteauroux	Loan	
July 31, 2013	(Belgium) Christopher Verbist	(Belgium) OH Leuven	(Belgium) Lommel United	Loan	

=== August 2013 ===
Date	Name	Moving from	Moving to	Fee	Note
August 1, 2013	(Belgium) Junior Malanda	(Belgium) Zulte Waregem	(Germany) VfL Wolfsburg	Undisclosed	(Note: Malanda was on sold to Wolfsburg, but both clubs agreed to immediately loan him back out to Zulte Waregem until 1 January 2014.)
August 2, 2013	(Italy) Gaetano Monachello	(France) AS Monaco	(Belgium) Cercle Brugge	Loan	
August 2, 2013	(Belgium) Kenny Van Hoevelen	(Belgium) Mechelen	(Netherlands) RKC Waalwijk	Loan	
August 7, 2013	(Belgium) Ilombe Mboyo	(Belgium) Gent	(Belgium) Genk	Undisclosed	
August 7, 2013	(Cameroon) Aloys Nong	(Belgium) Mons	(Spain) Levante	Undisclosed	
August 8, 2013	(Belgium) Zinho Gano	(Belgium) Club Brugge	(Belgium) Lommel United	Loan	
August 9, 2013	(Belgium) Brecht Dejaegere	(Belgium) Kortrijk	(Belgium) Gent	Undisclosed	
August 9, 2013	(Albania) Enis Gavazaj	(Kosovo) Prishtina	(Belgium) Gent	Undisclosed	
August 9, 2013	(Cameroon) Aboubakar Oumarou	(Serbia) Vojvodina	(Belgium) Waasland-Beveren	Undisclosed	
August 10, 2013	(Japan) Kensuke Nagai	(Belgium) Standard Liège	(Japan) Nagoya Grampus	Loan	
August 12, 2013	(Serbia) Aleksandar Mitrović	(Serbia) Partizan Belgrade	(Belgium) Anderlecht	5 000 000 €	(Note: As part of the deal between Partizan Belgrade and Anderlecht, Mitrović will remain with Partizan Belgrade until completion of their matches in the play-off round of the 2013–14 UEFA Europa League.)
August 12, 2013	(Sweden) Guillermo Molins	(Belgium) Anderlecht	(Sweden) Malmö	Undisclosed	(Note: Molins was on loan from Anderlecht to Betis Sevilla during the second half of the 2012-13 season. The loan ended and Molins was sold to Malmö.)
August 13, 2013	(Sweden) Samuel Armenteros	(Belgium) Anderlecht	(Netherlands) Feyenoord	Loan	
August 13, 2013	(Czech Republic) Lukáš Mareček	(Belgium) Anderlecht	(Czech Republic) Sparta Prague	Undisclosed	(Note: Mareček was on loan from Anderlecht to Heerenveen during the 2012-13 season. The loan ended and Mareček was sold to Sparta Prague.)
August 16, 2013	(Ivory Coast) Souleymane Diomandé	(Mali) JMG Academy	(Belgium) Lierse	Undisclosed	
August 16, 2013	(Croatia) Ivan Lendrić	(Belgium) Zulte Waregem	(Croatia) Lokomotiva	Undisclosed	
August 16, 2013	(Belgium) Arne Naudts	(Belgium) Cercle Brugge	(Belgium) Racing Mechelen	Loan	(Note: Naudts was on loan from Cercle Brugge to Oudenaarde during the second half of the 2012-13 season. The loan ended, but Naudts was now loaned to Racing Mechelen.)
August 16, 2013	(Mali) Hamari Traoré	(Mali) JMG Academy	(Belgium) Lierse	Undisclosed	
August 18, 2013	(Zimbabwe) Nyasha Mushekwi	(South Africa) Mamelodi Sundowns	(Belgium) Oostende	Undisclosed	
August 20, 2013	(Cameroon) Steve Beleck	(Italy) Udinese	(Belgium) Mons	Loan	
August 20, 2013	(Senegal) Christophe Diandy	(Belgium) Anderlecht	(Belgium) Mons	Undisclosed	(Note: Diandy was on loan from Anderlecht to Charleroi during the 2012-13 season. The loan ended and Diandy was now sold to Mons.)
August 20, 2013	(Belgium) Carl Hoefkens	(Belgium) Club Brugge	(Belgium) Lierse	Free	
August 20, 2013	(France) Fabrice N'Sakala	(France) Troyes	(Belgium) Anderlecht	Undisclosed	
August 21, 2013	(Belgium) Jorn Vermeulen	(Belgium) OH Leuven	(Belgium) Waasland-Beveren	Free	(Note: Vermeulen was on loan from OH Leuven to Antwerp during the 2012-13 season. The loan ended and Vermeulen was subsequently released by OHL, allowing him to sign for Waasland-Beveren without any transfer fee.)
August 22, 2013	(Belgium) Jason Adesanya	(Belgium) Lierse	(Belgium) ASV Geel	Undisclosed	
August 22, 2013	(Belgium) Nathan Kabasele	(Belgium) Anderlecht	(Netherlands) De Graafschap	Loan	(Note: Kabasele was on loan from Anderlecht to Torino during the second half of the 2012-13 season. The loan but now Kabasele was loaned to De Graafschap.)
August 22, 2013	(Belgium) Niels Mestdagh	(Belgium) Cercle Brugge	(Belgium) Hamme	Loan	
August 23, 2013	(France) Joris Delle	(France) Nice	(Belgium) Cercle Brugge	Loan	
August 26, 2013	(North Macedonia) Jovan Kostovski	(North Macedonia) Vardar Skopje	(Belgium) OH Leuven	Undisclosed	
August 26, 2013	(France) Harry Novillo	(France) Lyon	(Belgium) Mons	Undisclosed	
August 26, 2013	(France) Sloan Privat	(France) Sochaux	(Belgium) Gent	Undisclosed	
August 27, 2013	(Brazil) Fernando Canesin	(Belgium) Anderlecht	(Belgium) Oostende	Loan	
August 27, 2013	(Belgium) Jordan Lukaku	(Belgium) Anderlecht	(Belgium) Oostende	Loan	
August 28, 2013	(Romania) George Țucudean	(Belgium) Standard Liège	(Romania) Dinamo Bucharest	Loan	
August 28, 2013	(Belgium) Jonathan Wilmet	(Belgium) Westerlo	(Belgium) Oostende	Undisclosed	
August 29, 2013	(Belgium) Michaël Heylen	(Belgium) Anderlecht	(Belgium) Kortrijk	Loan	
August 29, 2013	(Israel) Liroy Zhairi	(Belgium) Mechelen	Free Agent	Released	(Note: Zhairi was on loan from Mechelen to Maccabi Haifa during the 2012-13 season. The loan ended but Zhairi was released.)
August 30, 2013	(Belgium) Mohammed Aoulad	(Belgium) Anderlecht	(Belgium) Sint-Truiden	Undisclosed	(Note: Aoulad was on loan from Anderlecht to Waasland-Beveren during the second half of the 2012-13 season. The loan ended but Aoulad was sold to Sint-Truiden.)
August 30, 2013	(Belgium) Geoffry Hairemans	(Belgium) Lierse	(Belgium) Turnhout	Loan	(Note: Hairemans was on already loan from Lierse to Turnhout during the second half of the 2012-13 season. The loan was renewed for another season.)
August 30, 2013	(Belgium) Nick Spaenhoven	(Belgium) Lierse	(Belgium) Turnhout	Loan	
August 30, 2013	(North Macedonia) Aleksandar Trajkovski	(Belgium) Zulte Waregem	(Belgium) Mechelen	Loan	
August 31, 2013	(France) Raphaël Cacérès	(France) Arles-Avignon	(Belgium) Zulte Waregem	Undisclosed	
August 31, 2013	(Peru) Hernán Hinostroza	(Belgium) Zulte Waregem	(Peru) Universidad de San Martín	Loan	
August 31, 2013	(Brazil) Nadson	(Belgium) Genk	(Russia) Krylia Sovetov	Undisclosed	
August 31, 2013	(Poland) Waldemar Sobota	(Poland) Śląsk Wrocław	(Belgium) Club Brugge	Undisclosed	

=== September 2013 ===
Date	Name	Moving from	Moving to	Fee	Note
September 1, 2013	(Morocco) Mehdi Carcela	(Russia) Anzhi Makhachkala	(Belgium) Standard Liège	Undisclosed	
September 1, 2013	(Nigeria) Kehinde Fatai	(Romania) Astra Giurgiu	(Belgium) Club Brugge	Loan	
September 1, 2013	(Belgium) Dean Michiels	(Belgium) OH Leuven	(Belgium) Heist	Undisclosed	
September 1, 2013	(Scotland) Tony Watt	(Scotland) Celtic	(Belgium) Lierse	Loan	
September 2, 2013	(Norway) Mushaga Bakenga	(Belgium) Club Brugge	(Denmark) Esbjerg	Loan	(Note: Bakenga was on loan from Club Brugge to Cercle Brugge during the 2012-13 season. The loan ended and Bakenga was now loaned to Esbjerg.)
September 2, 2013	(France) Franck Berrier	(Belgium) Zulte Waregem	(Belgium) Oostende	Loan	
September 2, 2013	(Netherlands) Tom Boere	(Belgium) Gent	(Belgium) Hoogstraten	Loan	
September 2, 2013	(Senegal) Elimane Coulibaly	(Belgium) Gent	(Belgium) Kortrijk	Loan	
September 2, 2013	(France) Neeskens Kebano	(France) Paris Saint-Germain	(Belgium) Charleroi	Undisclosed	
September 2, 2013	(Nigeria) Kennedy	(Belgium) Genk	(Belgium) Westerlo	Loan	(Note: Kennedy was on loan from Club Brugge to Beerschot during the second half of the 2012-13 season. The loan ended and Kennedy was now loaned to Westerlo.)
September 2, 2013	(France) Blanstel Koussalouka	(Belgium) Kortrijk	Free Agent	Released	(Note: Koussalouka was on loan from Kortrijk to Boussu Dour during the second half of the 2012-13 season. The loan ended and Koussalouka was released.)
September 2, 2013	(Belgium) Sven Kums	(Netherlands) Heerenveen	(Belgium) Zulte Waregem	Undisclosed	
September 2, 2013	(France) Formose Mendy	(France) Lille	(Belgium) Zulte Waregem	Undisclosed	
September 2, 2013	(Morocco) Zakaria M'Sila	(Belgium) Gent	(Belgium) Hoogstraten	Loan	
September 2, 2013	(Slovenia) Vito Plut	(Belgium) Waasland-Beveren	Free Agent	Released	
September 2, 2013	(Serbia) Milan Savić	(Belgium) Gent	(Belgium) Hoogstraten	Loan	
September 2, 2013	(Guinea) Idrissa Sylla	(France) Le Mans	(Belgium) Zulte Waregem	Undisclosed	
September 2, 2013	(Belgium) Mehdi Tarfi	(Belgium) Anderlecht	(Belgium) Zulte Waregem	Loan	
September 2, 2013	(France) Julien Toudic	(Belgium) Zulte Waregem	(France) Laval	Undisclosed	
September 2, 2013	(Belgium) David Vandenbroeck	(Belgium) Zulte Waregem	(Belgium) Tubize	Undisclosed	(Note: Vandenbroeck was on loan from Zulte Waregem to Antwerp during the second half of the 2012-13 season. The loan ended and Vandenbroeck was sold to Tubize.)
September 3, 2013	(Belgium) Didier Cabumi	(Belgium) Lokeren	(Belgium) Dender EH	Loan	
September 3, 2013	(Belgium) Miguel Dachelet	(Belgium) Lierse	(Belgium) Heist	Free	
September 3, 2013	(Spain) Walter Fernández	(Belgium) Lokeren	(Romania) Petrolul Ploiești	Loan	
September 3, 2013	(Greece) Valentinos Vlachos	(Greece) AEK Athens	(Belgium) Club Brugge	Undisclosed	

== Sorted by team ==
=== Anderlecht ===
In:

No.	Pos.	Nation	Player
2	DF	FRA	Fabrice N'Sakala (from (France) Troyes)
6	MF	NED	Demy de Zeeuw (again on loan from (Russia) Spartak Moscow)
8	MF	SRB	Luka Milivojević (from (Serbia) Red Star Belgrade)
18	MF	GHA	Frank Acheampong (was on loan from (Thailand) Buriram United, now bought)
29	MF	ESP	Fede Vico (from (Spain) Córdoba)
45	FW	SRB	Aleksandar Mitrović (from (Serbia) Partizan Belgrade)

Out:

No.	Pos.	Nation	Player
5	MF	ARG	Lucas Biglia (to (Italy) Lazio)
7	FW	SWE	Samuel Armenteros (on loan to (Netherlands) Feyenoord)
8	DF	BEL	Denis Odoi (to (Belgium) Lokeren)
11	FW	SRB	Milan Jovanović (released)
17	FW	UKR	Sacha Iakovenko (to (Italy) Fiorentina)
20	DF	SWE	Behrang Safari (to (Switzerland) Basel)
21	FW	BEL	Tom De Sutter (to (Belgium) Club Brugge)
23	DF	HUN	Roland Juhász (was on loan to (Hungary) Videoton, now sold)
25	FW	COD	Dieumerci Mbokani (to (Ukraine) Dynamo Kyiv)
27	FW	POL	Marcin Wasilewski (released)
37	DF	BEL	Jordan Lukaku (on loan to (Belgium) Oostende)
55	MF	BRA	Fernando Canesin (on loan to (Belgium) Oostende)
—	FW	BEL	Mohammed Aoulad (was on loan to (Belgium) Waasland-Beveren, now sold to (Belgium) Sint-Truiden)
—	MF	BEL	Ziguy Badibanga (was on loan to (Belgium) Charleroi, now sold to (Greece) Ergotelis)
—	DF	ARG	Pablo Chavarría (was on loan to (Belgium) Kortrijk, now sold to (France) Lens)
—	MF	SEN	Mohamed Daf (to (Belgium) Charleroi)
—	MF	SEN	Christophe Diandy (was on loan to (Belgium) Charleroi, now sold to (Belgium) Mons)
—	MF	BEL	Seydina Diarra (to (Netherlands) NEC)
—	MF	ESP	Jordan Garcia-Calvete (was on loan to (Netherlands) De Graafschap, now sold)
—	DF	BEL	Bruno Godeau (was on loan to (Belgium) Zulte Waregem, now sold)
—	DF	BEL	Michaël Heylen (on loan to (Belgium) Kortrijk)
—	FW	COD	Junior Kabananga (was on loan to (Belgium) Roeselare, now sold to (Belgium) Cercle Brugge)
—	FW	BEL	Nathan Kabasele (was on loan to (Italy) Torino, now loaned to (Netherlands) De Graafschap)
—	MF	CZE	Lukáš Mareček (was on loan to (Netherlands) Heerenveen, now sold to (Czech Republic) Sparta Prague)
—	MF	SWE	Guillermo Molins (was on loan to (Spain) Betis Sevilla, now sold to (Sweden) Malmö)
—	MF	BEL	René Sterckx (was on loan to (Belgium) Waasland-Beveren, now sold)
—	MF	BEL	Mehdi Tarfi (on loan to (Belgium) Zulte Waregem)
—	DF	BEL	Bryan Verboom (was on loan to (Belgium) Zulte Waregem, now sold)
—	FW	SRB	Dalibor Veselinović (on loan to (Belgium) Waasland-Beveren)

=== Cercle Brugge ===
In:

No.	Pos.	Nation	Player
4	DF	BEL	Bart Buysse (from (Belgium) Club Brugge)
11	FW	CMR	Gaël Etock (from (Portugal) Sporting)
12	MF	BEL	Frederik Boi (was on loan from (Belgium) OH Leuven, now signed permanently)
16	GK	BEL	Miguel Vandamme (from (Belgium) Maldegem)
18	GK	FRA	Joris Delle (on loan from (France) Nice)
41	MF	BEL	Thibaut Van Acker (from (Belgium) Club Brugge)
73	FW	ITA	Gaetano Monachello (on loan from (France) AS Monaco)
89	FW	COD	Junior Kabananga (from (Belgium) Anderlecht)

Out:

No.	Pos.	Nation	Player
3	DF	BEL	Anthony Portier (released)
4	DF	BEL	Bernt Evens (released)
11	FW	NOR	Mushaga Bakenga (loan return to (Belgium) Club Brugge)
14	FW	POR	Rudy (to (Spain) Deportivo La Coruña)
15	FW	URU	Joaquín Boghossian (loan return to (Austria) Salzburg)
16	GK	NED	Mitchell Braafhart (released)
18	MF	BEL	Kevin Janssens (to (Belgium) Eendracht Aalst)
19	DF	GHA	Francis Dickoh (released)
21	MF	POR	William Carvalho (loan return to (Portugal) Sporting)
22	FW	NED	Joey Godee (on loan to (Netherlands) Go Ahead Eagles)
34	FW	BEL	Arne Naudts (was on loan to (Belgium) Oudenaarde, now loaned to (Belgium) Racing Mechelen)
37	DF	BEL	Niels Mestdagh (on loan to (Belgium) Hamme)
—	FW	BEL	Ward Stubbe (on loan to (Belgium) Torhout)
—	FW	CHN	Wang Yang (released)

=== Charleroi ===
In:

No.	Pos.	Nation	Player
6	DF	BEL	Sebastien Dewaest (from (Belgium) Roeselare)
7	FW	CTA	Evans Kondogbia (from (Belgium) RFC Liège)
14	DF	FRA	Steeven Willems (from (France) Lille)
16	FW	SEN	Jamal Thiaré (was on loan from (Senegal) CNEPS Excellence, now bought)
17	DF	GRE	Stergos Marinos (from (Greece) Panathinaikos)
24	GK	BEL	Olivier Renard (on loan from (Belgium) Mechelen)
25	MF	FRA	Damien Marcq (from (France) Caen)
30	MF	SEN	Mohamed Daf (from (Belgium) Anderlecht)
31	FW	FRA	Harlem Gnohéré (loan return from (Belgium) Westerlo)
88	MF	BOL	Vicente Arze (loan return from (Iran) Esteghlal)
92	MF	FRA	Neeskens Kebano (from (France) Paris Saint-Germain)

Out:

No.	Pos.	Nation	Player
1	GK	GRE	Michalis Sifakis (to (Greece) Atromitos)
3	DF	SVN	Elvedin Džinić (to (Bulgaria) Botev Plovdiv)
4	DF	PLE	Omar Jarun (released)
6	DF	BEL	Dorian Dessoleil (to (Belgium) Sint-Truiden)
13	MF	SEN	Christophe Diandy (loan return to (Belgium) Anderlecht)
14	MF	BEL	Samuel Fabris (to (Belgium) WS Brussels)
17	DF	ISR	Matan Ohayon (to (Israel) Ironi Kiryat Shmona)
21	DF	MNE	Mijuško Bojović (to (Belgium) Waasland-Beveren)
26	DF	BEL	Grégory Lazitch (to (Belgium) WS Brussels)
28	MF	GER	Viktor Bopp (released)
29	MF	BEL	Ziguy Badibanga (loan return to (Belgium) Anderlecht)
30	MF	BRA	Leandro (released)

=== Club Brugge ===
In:

No.	Pos.	Nation	Player
1	GK	AUS	Mathew Ryan (from (Australia) Central Coast Mariners)
3	DF	BEL	Timmy Simons (from (Germany) 1. FC Nürnberg)
9	FW	BEL	Tom De Sutter (from (Belgium) Anderlecht)
15	FW	CHN	Wang Shangyuan (free agent)
20	MF	GRE	Spyros Fourlanos (from (Greece) Panathinaikos)
24	DF	GRE	Valentinos Vlachos (from (Greece) AEK Athens)
27	DF	POR	Elton Monteiro (from (England) Arsenal Academy)
—	FW	NGA	Kehinde Fatai (on loan from (Romania) Astra Giurgiu)
—	FW	GUI	Obbi Oulare (from (France) Lille)
—	FW	POL	Waldemar Sobota (from (Poland) Śląsk Wrocław)

Out:

No.	Pos.	Nation	Player
3	DF	SWE	Michael Almebäck (to (Denmark) Brøndby)
4	DF	BEL	Carl Hoefkens (to (Belgium) Lierse)
9	FW	BEL	Björn Vleminckx (was on loan to (Turkey) Gençlerbirliği, now sold to (Turkey) Kayseri Erciyesspor)
17	FW	MKD	Ivan Tričkovski (on loan to (Belgium) Waasland-Beveren)
18	DF	NED	Ryan Donk (to (Turkey) Kasımpaşa)
20	MF	BEL	Thibaut Van Acker (was on loan to (Belgium) Beerschot, now sold to (Belgium) Cercle Brugge)
21	DF	BEL	Bart Buysse (to (Belgium) Cercle Brugge)
22	DF	ESP	Jordi Figueras (was on loan to (Spain) Rayo Vallecano, now sold to (Spain) Betis Sevilla)
25	FW	NOR	Mushaga Bakenga (was on loan to (Belgium) Cercle Brugge, now loaned to (Denmark) Esbjerg)
28	DF	BEL	Jannes Vansteenkiste (to (Belgium) Antwerp)
39	GK	SRB	Bojan Jorgačević (to (Turkey) Kayseri Erciyesspor)
70	FW	COL	Carlos Bacca (to (Spain) Sevilla)
—	FW	NED	Jordan Botaka (was on loan to (Portugal) Belenenses, now sold to (Netherlands) Excelsior)
—	GK	BEL	Colin Coosemans (was on loan to (Belgium) Waasland-Beveren, now sold)
—	MF	BEL	Jimmy De Jonghe (was on loan to (Belgium) Zulte Waregem, now loaned to (Belgium) Lierse)
—	FW	BEL	Zinho Gano (on loan to (Belgium) Lommel United)
—	DF	BEL	Maxime Gunst (was on loan to (Belgium) Eendracht Aalst, now sold to (Netherlands) FC Eindhoven)

=== Genk ===
In:

No.	Pos.	Nation	Player
15	MF	TUN	Fabien Camus (loan return from (France) Troyes)
99	FW	BEL	Ilombe Mboyo (from (Belgium) Gent)
—	FW	NED	Albian Muzaqi (from (Netherlands) PSV)

Out:

No.	Pos.	Nation	Player
6	MF	BEL	David Hubert (was on loan to (Belgium) Gent, now sold)
14	FW	NED	Glynor Plet (loan return to (Netherlands) Twente)
18	FW	ISR	Elyaniv Barda (to (Israel) Hapoel Be'er Sheva)
20	DF	BRA	Nadson (to (Russia) Krylia Sovetov)
—	FW	NGA	Kennedy (was on loan to (Belgium) Beerschot, now loaned to (Belgium) Westerlo)
—	GK	POL	Grzegorz Sandomierski (was on loan to (England) Blackburn Rovers, now loaned to (Croatia) Dinamo Zagreb)
—	FW	BEL	Leandro Trossard (was on loan to (Belgium) Lommel United, now loaned to (Belgium) Westerlo)

=== Gent ===
In:

No.	Pos.	Nation	Player
2	DF	URU	Carlos Diogo (from (Spain) Huesca)
5	DF	ARG	Leandro González Pirez (on loan from (Argentina) River Plate)
7	MF	BEL	Yassine El Ghanassy (loan return from (Netherlands) Heerenveen)
10	MF	BRA	Renato Neto (again on loan from (Portugal) Sporting)
14	MF	BEL	David Hubert (was on loan from (Belgium) Genk, now bought)
21	DF	GHA	Nana Asare (from (Netherlands) Utrecht)
28	FW	DEN	Nicklas Pedersen (from (Belgium) Mechelen)
—	MF	BEL	Brecht Dejaegere (from (Belgium) Kortrijk)
—	DF	ALB	Enis Gavazaj (from (Kosovo) Prishtina)
—	FW	FRA	Sloan Privat (from (France) Sochaux)

Out:

No.	Pos.	Nation	Player
6	DF	ESP	Melli (released)
7	MF	BEL	Christian Brüls (on loan to (France) Nice)
9	FW	BEL	Ilombe Mboyo (to (Belgium) Genk)
11	FW	BEL	Jordan Remacle (was on loan to (Belgium) Waasland-Beveren, now sold to (Belgium) Lokeren)
13	MF	MLI	Mamoutou N'Diaye (to (Belgium) Zulte Waregem)
21	MF	BEL	Mohamed Messoudi (to (Belgium) OH Leuven)
23	FW	BEL	Stijn De Smet (was on loan to (Belgium) Waasland-Beveren, now sold to (Belgium) Kortrijk)
25	DF	BRA	Wallace (released)
27	FW	BEL	Benito Raman (was on loan to (Belgium) Beerschot, now loaned to (Belgium) Kortrijk)
30	DF	SRB	Milan Savić (on loan to (Belgium) Hoogstraten)
32	MF	BEL	Thomas Foket (on loan to (Belgium) Oostende)
—	FW	ISR	Shlomi Arbeitman (was on loan to (Belgium) Mons, now sold)
—	FW	NED	Tom Boere (on loan to (Belgium) Hoogstraten)
—	MF	BIH	Armin Čerimagić (again on loan to (Belgium) Eendracht Aalst)
—	MF	GUI	Ibrahima Conté (was on loan to (Belgium) Zulte Waregem, now sold)
—	DF	BEL	Wouter Corstjens (was on loan to (Belgium) Westerlo, now loaned to (Belgium) Lierse)
—	FW	SEN	Elimane Coulibaly (on loan to (Belgium) Kortrijk)
—	MF	MAR	Zakaria M'Sila (on loan to (Belgium) Hoogstraten)

=== Kortrijk ===
In:

No.	Pos.	Nation	Player
2	DF	LUX	Maxime Chanot (from (Belgium) Beerschot)
7	FW	BEL	Stijn De Smet (from (Belgium) Gent)
9	FW	FRA	Teddy Chevalier (from (Netherlands) RKC)
10	MF	NED	Robert Klaasen (from (Netherlands) AZ)
18	FW	CRO	Ivan Santini (from (Croatia) Zadar)
27	FW	BEL	Benito Raman (on loan from (Belgium) Gent)
33	DF	MNE	Žarko Tomašević (from (Serbia) Partizan Belgrade)
—	FW	SEN	Elimane Coulibaly (on loan from (Belgium) Gent)
—	DF	BEL	Michaël Heylen (on loan from (Belgium) Anderlecht)

Out:

No.	Pos.	Nation	Player
6	DF	BEL	David Wijns (to (Belgium) OH Leuven)
9	FW	FRA	Kévin Dupuis (on loan to (France) Châteauroux)
10	MF	CMR	Ernest Nfor (released)
19	MF	BEL	Brecht Dejaegere (to (Belgium) Gent)
24	MF	FRA	Blanstel Koussalouka (was on loan to (Belgium) Boussu Dour, now released)
25	DF	SRB	Stefan Mitrović (to (Portugal) Benfica)
—	DF	ARG	Pablo Chavarría (loan return to (Belgium) Anderlecht)

=== Lierse ===
In:

No.	Pos.	Nation	Player
27	FW	BRA	Wamberto (from (Belgium) Beerschot)
—	GK	UKR	Igor Berezovsky (from (Poland) Legia Warsaw)
—	MF	BRA	Bruno (undisclosed)
—	DF	BEL	Wouter Corstjens (on loan from (Belgium) Gent)
—	MF	BEL	Jimmy De Jonghe (on loan from (Belgium) Club Brugge)
—	MF	CIV	Souleymane Diomandé (from (Mali) JMG Academy)
—	MF	BEL	Rachid Farssi (from (Belgium) Waasland-Beveren)
—	MF	EGY	Hossam Ghaly (from (Egypt) Al Ahly)
—	DF	BEL	Carl Hoefkens (from (Belgium) Club Brugge)
—	MF	EST	Enar Jääger (from (Norway) Aalesund)
—	MF	ARG	Hernán Losada (from (Belgium) Beerschot)
—	DF	MLI	Hamari Traoré (from (Mali) JMG Academy)
—	GK	BEL	Steven Verheyen (from (Belgium) Beerschot)
—	FW	SCO	Tony Watt (on loan from (Scotland) Celtic)
—	FW	EGY	Ahmed Yasser (from (Egypt) Wadi Degla)

Out:

No.	Pos.	Nation	Player
5	MF	EGY	Mostafa Shebeita (loan return to (Egypt) Wadi Degla)
7	FW	EGY	Mohamed El-Gabbas (released)
8	FW	MAR	Soufiane Bidaoui (to (Italy) Parma)
9	FW	CMR	Christian Pouga (loan return to (Belgium) OH Leuven)
13	DF	EGY	Ahmed Said (loan return to (Egypt) Wadi Degla)
14	MF	RSA	Daylon Claasen (released)
19	MF	BEL	Jason Adesanya (on loan to (Belgium) ASV Geel)
20	DF	EGY	Ahmed Abou Moslem (released)
22	GK	EGY	Essam Mahmoud (loan return to (Egypt) Wadi Degla)
27	MF	BEL	Glenn Claes (to Mechelen)
—	DF	BEL	Miguel Dachelet (to (Belgium) Heist)
—	MF	BEL	Geoffry Hairemans (again on loan to Turnhout)
—	MF	BEL	Nick Spaenhoven (on loan to Turnhout)

=== Lokeren ===
In:

No.	Pos.	Nation	Player
—	FW	SRB	Djordje Despotović (from (Serbia) Spartak Subotica)
—	DF	BEL	Denis Odoi (from (Belgium) Anderlecht)
—	FW	NGA	Abayomi Owonikoko (from (Georgia (country)) Gagra)
—	FW	BEL	Jordan Remacle (from (Belgium) Gent)
—	MF	BEL	Hans Vanaken (from (Belgium) Lommel United)
—	GK	BEL	Davino Verhulst (from (Belgium) Sint-Truiden)

Out:

No.	Pos.	Nation	Player
2	DF	BEL	Sepp De Roover (was on loan to (Netherlands) NAC, now sold)
3	DF	MAR	Hassan El Mouataz (released)
6	MF	COD	Tiko (released)
11	MF	ESP	Walter Fernández (on loan to (Romania) Petrolul Ploiești)
14	FW	BEL	Benjamin Mokulu (to (Belgium) Mechelen)
18	MF	SRB	Miloš Marić (to (Belgium) Waasland-Beveren)
22	MF	CRO	Paolo Grbac (released)
23	DF	SEN	Ibrahima Gueye (released)
—	FW	BEL	Didier Cabumi (on loan to (Belgium) Dender EH)

=== Mechelen ===
In:

No.	Pos.	Nation	Player
3	DF	POL	Seweryn Michalski (from (Poland) Bełchatów)
14	FW	BEL	Benjamin Mokulu (from (Belgium) Lokeren)
16	FW	SWE	Viktor Prodell (from (Sweden) Åtvidaberg)
23	GK	GER	Sören Ihssen (from (Belgium) WS Woluwe)
24	MF	BEL	Glenn Claes (from (Belgium) Lierse)
—	FW	MKD	Aleksandar Trajkovski (on loan from (Belgium) Zulte Waregem)

Out:

No.	Pos.	Nation	Player
5	DF	BEL	Kenny Van Hoevelen (on loan to (Netherlands) RKC Waalwijk)
16	GK	BEL	Olivier Renard (on loan to (Belgium) Charleroi)
20	FW	COL	Jaime Alfonso Ruiz (to (Belgium) Westerlo)
22	MF	BEL	Robin Henkens (to (Belgium) Waasland-Beveren)
30	FW	DEN	Nicklas Pedersen (to (Belgium) Gent)
—	MF	ISR	Liroy Zhairi (was on loan to (Israel) Maccabi Haifa, now released)

=== Mons ===
In:

No.	Pos.	Nation	Player
8	FW	BEL	Joachim Mununga (from (Belgium) Beerschot)
10	FW	FRA	Harry Novillo (from (France) Lyon)
14	DF	ISR	Yuval Spungin (from (Cyprus) Omonia)
19	FW	ISR	Shlomi Arbeitman (was on loan from (Belgium) Gent, now bought)
—	FW	CMR	Steve Beleck (on loan from (Italy) Udinese)
—	MF	SEN	Christophe Diandy (from (Belgium) Anderlecht)

Out:

No.	Pos.	Nation	Player
1	GK	FRA	Cédric Berthelin (to (Belgium) Oostende)
6	MF	FRA	Matthieu Debisschop (released)
8	MF	BEL	Tom van Imschoot (to (Belgium) Oostende)
9	FW	CMR	Aloys Nong (to (Spain) Levante)
11	MF	PER	Carlo Chueca (released)
17	MF	BEL	Quentin Pottiez (released)
19	FW	FRA	Jérémy Perbet (was on loan to (Spain) Villarreal, now sold)
—	MF	BEL	Brahim Barmaki (to (Belgium) WS Brussels)

=== OH Leuven ===
In:

No.	Pos.	Nation	Player
2	DF	SWE	Tom Pettersson (on loan from (Sweden) Åtvidaberg)
9	FW	BEL	Marvin Ogunjimi (on loan from (Spain) Mallorca)
10	MF	BRA	Douglas Maia (free agent)
17	MF	BEL	Mohamed Messoudi (from (Belgium) Gent)
18	DF	BEL	David Wijns (from (Belgium) Kortrijk)
19	FW	MKD	Jovan Kostovski (from (North Macedonia) Vardar Skopje)
23	DF	BUL	Ivan Bandalovski (from (Bulgaria) CSKA Sofia)
25	DF	BIH	Muhamed Subašić (on loan from (Bosnia and Herzegovina) Olimpic Sarajevo)
28	MF	GUI	Zainoul Haidara (from (Belgium) Bleid-Gaume)

Out:

No.	Pos.	Nation	Player
2	MF	BEL	Frederik Boi (was on loan to (Belgium) Cercle Brugge, now released to (Belgium) Cercle Brugge)
2	DF	CRO	Tomislav Mikulić (to (Greece) Panthrakikos)
9	FW	CMR	Christian Pouga (was on loan to (Belgium) Lierse, now sold to (Turkey) Ankaraspor)
17	DF	BEL	Koen Weuts (to (Netherlands) Helmond Sport)
18	DF	BEL	Jonas De Roeck (to (Belgium) Antwerp)
19	FW	BEL	Loris Brogno (on loan to (Belgium) Lommel United)
21	GK	BEL	Dean Michiels (to (Belgium) Heist)
22	MF	BEL	Emmerik De Vriese (released)
23	FW	NGA	Chuka (to (Romania) CFR Cluj)
25	MF	BEL	Christopher Verbist (on loan to (Belgium) Lommel United)
28	FW	KSA	Mazin Ahmed Al-Huthayfi (undisclosed)
—	DF	BEL	Nicky Hayen (was on loan to (Belgium) Antwerp, now sold to (Belgium) Dender EH)
—	MF	BEL	Kevin Roelandts (was on loan to (Belgium) Antwerp, now sold to (Belgium) Maldegem)
—	DF	BEL	Jorn Vermeulen (was on loan to (Belgium) Antwerp, now released to (Belgium) Waasland-Beveren)

=== Oostende ===
In:

No.	Pos.	Nation	Player
—	MF	FRA	Franck Berrier (on loan from (Belgium) Zulte Waregem)
—	GK	FRA	Cédric Berthelin (from (Belgium) Mons)
—	DF	FRA	Frédéric Brillant (from (Belgium) Beerschot)
—	MF	BRA	Fernando Canesin (on loan from (Belgium) Anderlecht)
—	DF	BEL	Denis Dessaer (from (Belgium) WS Woluwe)
—	MF	BEL	Thomas Foket (on loan from (Belgium) Gent)
—	DF	BEL	Jimmy Hempte (from (Netherlands) Roda JC)
—	DF	BEL	Jordan Lukaku (on loan from (Belgium) Anderlecht)
—	FW	ZIM	Nyasha Mushekwi (from (South Africa) Mamelodi Sundowns)
—	MF	BEL	Tom van Imschoot (from (Belgium) Mons)
—	MF	BEL	Jonathan Wilmet (from (Belgium) Westerlo)

Out:

No.	Pos.	Nation	Player
14	MF	BEL	Lander Van Steenbrugghe (to (Belgium) Eendracht Aalst)
—	DF	BEL	Lionel Gendarme (to (Belgium) Union SG)
—	MF	BEL	Jamaïque Vandamme (to (Belgium) Union SG)

=== Standard Liège ===
In:

No.	Pos.	Nation	Player
2	DF	ITA	Alessandro Iandoli (on loan from (Belgium) Sint-Truiden)
8	DF	NED	Ronnie Stam (from (England) Wigan)
10	FW	BEL	Igor de Camargo (from (Germany) Borussia Mönchengladbach)
26	DF	ISR	Tal Ben Haim (from (England) Queens Park Rangers)
30	GK	FRA	Yohann Thuram-Ulien (from (France) Troyes)
75	MF	TUR	Alpaslan Öztürk (from (Belgium) Beerschot)
—	MF	MAR	Mehdi Carcela (from (Russia) Anzhi Makhachkala)
—	MF	BEL	Georgiy Zhukov (from (Belgium) Beerschot)

Out:

No.	Pos.	Nation	Player
3	DF	POR	Yohan Tavares (was on loan to (Portugal) Estoril, now sold to (Italy) Chievo)
5	DF	ISR	Rami Gershon (was on loan to (Scotland) Celtic, now sold to (Belgium) Waasland-Beveren)
9	FW	ROU	George Țucudean (on loan to (Romania) Dinamo Bucharest)
13	FW	JPN	Kensuke Nagai (on loan to (Japan) Nagoya Grampus)
27	GK	BEL	Laurent Henkinet (was on loan to (Belgium) Dessel Sport, now loaned to (Belgium) Sint-Truiden)
38	GK	TUR	Sinan Bolat (to (Portugal) Porto)
—	MF	BEL	Franco Zennaro (was on loan to (Belgium) Waasland-Beveren, now loaned to (Netherlands) Fortuna Sittard)

=== Waasland-Beveren ===
In:

No.	Pos.	Nation	Player
3	DF	CRO	Hrvoje Čale (from (Germany) VfL Wolfsburg)
5	DF	MNE	Mijuško Bojović (from (Belgium) Charleroi)
7	FW	MKD	Ivan Tričkovski (on loan from (Belgium) Club Brugge)
8	MF	BEL	Robin Henkens (from (Belgium) Mechelen)
9	FW	SRB	Dalibor Veselinović (on loan from (Belgium) Anderlecht)
10	MF	SRB	Miloš Marić (from (Belgium) Lokeren)
11	MF	VEN	Christian Santos (from (Belgium) Eupen)
14	MF	ISR	Hanan Maman (from (Israel) Hapoel Haifa)
16	FW	BEL	Renaud Emond (from (Belgium) Virton)
17	MF	FRA	Nicolas Godemèche (from (Romania) CFR Cluj)
18	GK	BEL	Kenny Steppe (from (Netherlands) Heerenveen)
24	MF	BEL	René Sterckx (was on loan from (Belgium) Anderlecht, now bought)
26	GK	BEL	Colin Coosemans (was on loan from (Belgium) Club Brugge, now bought)
32	FW	SVK	Róbert Demjan (from (Poland) Bielsko-Biała)
55	DF	ISR	Rami Gershon (from (Belgium) Standard Liège)
—	DF	NGA	Chimezie Mbah (from (Israel) Hakoah Amidar Ramat Gan)
—	FW	FRA	Fayçal Lebbihi (from (France) Grenoble)
—	FW	CMR	Aboubakar Oumarou (from (Serbia) Vojvodina)
—	DF	BEL	Jorn Vermeulen (from (Belgium) OH Leuven)

Out:

No.	Pos.	Nation	Player
2	DF	BEL	Kristof Lardenoit (to (Belgium) Temse)
4	DF	BEL	Jonas Ivens (loan return to (Netherlands) Groningen)
7	FW	BEL	Jurgen Cavens (to (Belgium) Cappellen)
8	MF	BEL	Rachid Farssi (to (Belgium) Lierse)
9	FW	ISR	Barak Badash (loan return to (Israel) Ironi Kiryat Shmona)
10	FW	BEL	Jordan Remacle (loan return to (Belgium) Gent)
11	MF	BEL	Alves Da Silva (released)
12	DF	ISR	Gal Shish (released)
14	FW	BEL	Wesley Sonck (released)
16	MF	BEL	Daniel Cruz (released)
17	FW	BEL	Stijn De Smet (loan return to (Belgium) Gent)
18	GK	BEL	Sam Vermeylen (to (Belgium) Berchem)
20	MF	BEL	Franco Zennaro (loan return to (Belgium) Standard Liège)
25	FW	SVN	Vito Plut (released)
28	FW	FRA	Sébastien Didier (released)
39	FW	ISR	Mohammad Ghadir (loan return to (Israel) Maccabi Haifa)
—	FW	BEL	Mohammed Aoulad (loan return to (Belgium) Anderlecht)
—	MF	SEN	Alain Mendy (released)
—	MF	FRA	Mikael Seoudi (on loan to (Belgium) RWDM Brussels)

=== Zulte Waregem ===
In:

No.	Pos.	Nation	Player
5	DF	BEL	Bryan Verboom (was on loan from (Belgium) Anderlecht, now bought)
7	FW	CTA	Habib Habibou (loan return from (England) Leeds)
8	MF	BEL	Thorgan Hazard (again on loan from (England) Chelsea)
13	MF	MLI	Mamoutou N'Diaye (from (Belgium) Gent)
17	MF	GUI	Ibrahima Conté (was on loan from (Belgium) Gent, now bought)
18	DF	FRA	Frédéric Duplus (from (France) Sochaux)
21	DF	BEL	Bruno Godeau (was on loan from (Belgium) Anderlecht, now bought)
25	GK	BEL	Salvatore Crimi (from (France) Lille)
28	MF	BEL	Junior Malanda (sold to (Germany) VfL Wolfsburg, but then loaned back)
30	MF	BEL	Ilias Maatoug (on loan from (Belgium) WS Brussels)
—	FW	FRA	Raphaël Cacérès (from (France) Arles-Avignon)
—	MF	BEL	Sven Kums (from (Netherlands) Heerenveen)
—	DF	FRA	Formose Mendy (from (France) Lille)
—	DF	MNE	Danilo Sarkić (from (France) Sochaux)
—	FW	GUI	Idrissa Sylla (from (France) Le Mans)
—	MF	BEL	Mehdi Tarfi (on loan from (Belgium) Anderlecht)

Out:

No.	Pos.	Nation	Player
6	MF	FRA	Jonathan Delaplace (to (France) Lille)
10	MF	FRA	Franck Berrier (on loan to (Belgium) Oostende)
11	FW	CRO	Ivan Lendrić (to (Croatia) Lokomotiva)
12	FW	MKD	Aleksandar Trajkovski (on loan to (Belgium) Mechelen)
27	MF	BEL	Jimmy De Jonghe (loan return to (Belgium) Club Brugge)
29	FW	FRA	Julien Toudic (signed from (France) Lens, immediately sold to (France) Laval)
—	MF	SEN	Mansour Diop (on loan to (Belgium) WS Brussels)
—	MF	PER	Hernán Hinostroza (on loan to (Peru) Universidad de San Martín)
—	DF	SEN	Elhadji Ndoye (on loan to (Belgium) WS Brussels)
—	MF	BEL	Jérémy Serwy (was on loan to (Belgium) WS Woluwe, now sold to (Germany) Dortmund B)
—	DF	BEL	David Vandenbroeck (was on loan to (Belgium) Antwerp, now sold to (Belgium) Tubize)
