= Kondogbia =

Kondogbia is a surname. Notable people with the surname include:

- Evans Kondogbia (born 1989), Central African footballer
- Geoffrey Kondogbia (born 1993), Central African footballer, brother of Evans
