= Maxime Gunst =

Belgian professional footballer

Personal information
- Date of birth: 6 August 1992 (age 34)
- Place of birth: Waregem, Belgium
- Height: 1.79 m (5 ft 10 in)
- Position: Left-back

Youth career
- KWS Desselgem
- –2007: Zulte Waregem
- 2007–2012: Club Brugge

Senior career*
Years	Team	Apps	(Gls)
2012–2013	Club Brugge	0	(0)
2012–2013	→ Eendracht Aalst (loan)	20	(1)
2013–2018	Eindhoven	97	(3)
2018–2019	MVV	28	(0)
2020	Roda JC	7	(0)
2020	Roeselare	0	(0)
Total		152	(4)
- * Club domestic league appearances and goals

Maxime Gunst (born 6 August 1992) is a Belgian former professional footballer who played as a left-back.

== Club career ==
=== Club Brugge ===
Gunst grew up in Desselgem, West Flanders. He joined local team KWS Desselgem at a young age and later made the move to Zulte Waregem. There, he was scouted by Club Brugge in 2007. In the youth teams, Gunst played as an attacking midfielder, but in the 2011–12 season he competed for the position of left-back with contemporaries such as Jannes Vansteenkiste and Jimmy De Jonghe. In 2012, he was promoted to the senior squad, and ahead of the 2012–13 season he was told by coach Georges Leekens that a loan would be the best option due to depth at the position with Jordi Figueras, Fredrik Stenman and Bart Buysse in front of him.

==== Eendracht Aalst (loan) ====
Gunst was sent on a one-season loan to Belgian Second Division club Eendracht Aalst in the summer of 2012. He made his debut for the East Flemish on 2 September in a 2–1 win over Sint-Truiden.

=== Eindhoven ===
After a season with Aalst, Gunst signed with Dutch Eerste Divisie club FC Eindhoven in the summer of 2013. He made his debut on 2 August in the season opener against VVV-Venlo. Halfway through the season, he suffered a serious injury, sidelining him for an extended period.

The 2014–15 season was a success both collectively and individually. He scored his first goal for Eindhoven against Telstar on 24 October 2014, and at the end of the season, the club had set a points record and finished second in the league table after champions NEC. In the play-offs, Eindhoven lost to FC Volendam. Gunst recorded 12 assists that season and scored three goals.

After rumours of Gunst leaving Eindhoven for AZ, he eventually signed a new contract with Eindhoven until 2018. That season, Gunst suffered a serious knee injury, which would eventually leave him sidelined for 8 months.

=== Later career ===
In August 2018, Gunst signed a two-year contract with league rivals MVV. He made 29 appearances for the club in his first season, before his contract was terminated by mutual consent in November 2019. This occurred after media reported that he and Pieter Nys had started an uprising against head coach Fuat Usta.

On 9 January 2020, Gunst signed a one-and-a-half-year contract plus a one-year option with Roda JC. His first game was against his previous club MVV, which ended in a 2–2 draw.

In 2020, Gunst returned to Belgium where he signed with Roeselare, but that club went bankrupt in September 2020 and he became a free agent.

== After football ==
Gunst retired from football after being released by Roeselare in 2020, and pursued a career as a personal trainer. In 2021, he became personal trainer for FitStudio in his hometown Waregem.
