= 2007 Champions Youth Cup =

Football tournament held in Malaysia

Tournament logo

The 2007 Champions Youth Cup was the first and only staging of the Champions Youth Cup, a proposed annual football tournament. It was supported by the G-14 group and was intended to be a Club World Championship for the Under-19 teams of some of the world's largest clubs. It took place in Malaysia from 5 August to 19 August 2007. It featured sixteen teams: eleven European teams, two teams from South America, a host invitee team from Europe, a host invitee team from Asia and the U-19 national team of the tournament hosts, Malaysia. Each match lasted only 70 minutes, and, in the event of a draw in the knockout stage, there was no extra time. A second edition of the tournament, was planned for August 2008. However it was canceled in June, two months before the start, because of a dispute between the Football Association of Malaysia and the Gifted Group, the tournament organizers.

== Groups ==
Qualified to the knockout stage
Eliminated

=== Group A ===
Team	Pld	W	D	L	GF	GA	GD	Pts
(Brazil) Flamengo	3	2	1	0	4	2	2	7
(Italy) Milan	3	2	1	0	3	1	2	7
(England) Arsenal	3	0	1	2	1	3	−2	1
(Netherlands) Ajax	3	0	1	2	0	2	−2	1

8 August 2007

Flamengo	1–1	Milan
Pedro Beda 44'	Report	Aubameyang 57'

Darulaman Stadium, Alor Setar

8 August 2007

Ajax	0–0	Arsenal
	Report

Darulaman Stadium, Alor Setar

10 August 2007

Ajax	0–1	Milan
	Report	Aubameyang 25'

Darulaman Stadium, Alor Setar

10 August 2007

Flamengo	2–1	Arsenal
Kayke 18', 43'	Report	Simpson 16'

Darulaman Stadium, Alor Setar

12 August 2007

Milan	1–0	Arsenal
Aubameyang 30'	Report

Darulaman Stadium, Alor Setar

12 August 2007

Flamengo	1–0	Ajax
Kayke 58'	Report

Cheras Stadium, Kuala Lumpur

=== Group B ===
Team	Pld	W	D	L	GF	GA	GD	Pts
(Spain) Barcelona	3	1	2	0	3	2	1	5
(Italy) Juventus	3	1	2	0	1	0	1	5
Qatar	3	0	3	0	2	2	0	3
(France) Paris Saint-Germain	3	0	1	2	2	4	−2	1

9 August 2007

Qatar	0–0	Juventus
	Report

Darulmakmur Stadium, Kuantan

9 August 2007

Paris Saint-Germain	1–2	Barcelona
Bolongo 45'	Report	Rodri 55', 57'

Darulmakmur Stadium, Kuantan

11 August 2007

Paris Saint-Germain	0–1	Juventus
	Report	Dantoni 55'

Darulmakmur Stadium, Kuantan

11 August 2007

Qatar	1–1	Barcelona
Al Haydos 34'	Report	Yepes 26'

Darulmakmur Stadium, Kuantan

13 August 2007

Juventus	0–0	Barcelona
	Report

Darulmakmur Stadium, Kuantan

13 August 2007

Qatar	1–1	Paris Saint-Germain
Al Haydos 45'	Report	Nkoum 70'

Cheras Stadium, Kuala Lumpur

=== Group C ===
Team	Pld	W	D	L	GF	GA	GD	Pts
(Italy) Internazionale	3	2	1	0	5	3	2	7
(England) Manchester United	3	2	0	1	5	4	1	6
(Argentina) Boca Juniors	3	0	2	1	5	6	−1	2
(Portugal) Porto	3	0	1	2	1	3	−2	1

9 August 2007

Boca Juniors	2–2	Internazionale
Rodríguez 4'; Lanaro 26'	Report	Litteri 28', 62'

Hang Jebat Stadium, Malacca

9 August 2007

Porto	0–1	Manchester United
	Report	Brandy 20'

Hang Jebat Stadium, Malacca

11 August 2007

Porto	0–1	Internazionale
	Report	Napoli 5'

Hang Jebat Stadium, Malacca

11 August 2007

Boca Juniors	2–3	Manchester United
Ibañez 26'; Colazzo 60'	Report	Drinkwater 5'; Hewson 22'; Brandy 40'

Hang Jebat Stadium, Malacca

13 August 2007

Internazionale	2–1	Manchester United
Alves 57'; Puccio 64'	Report	McCormack 26'

Hang Jebat Stadium, Malacca

13 August 2007

Boca Juniors	1–1	Porto
Palavecino 33'	Report	Elísio 63'

Cheras Stadium, Kuala Lumpur

=== Group D ===
Team	Pld	W	D	L	GF	GA	GD	Pts
(Germany) Bayern Munich	3	2	1	0	4	1	3	7
(Netherlands) PSV	3	2	0	1	3	1	2	6
(England) Chelsea	3	0	2	1	1	2	−1	2
Malaysia	3	0	1	2	1	4	−3	1

8 August 2007

Malaysia	1–2	Bayern Munich
Kopplin 55'		Simari 35'; Bopp 70'

Sarawak Stadium, Kuching

8 August 2007

PSV	1–0	Chelsea
Hasselbaink 47'

Sarawak Stadium, Kuching

10 August 2007

PSV	0–1	Bayern Munich
		Bopp 20' (pen.)

Sarawak Stadium, Kuching

10 August 2007

Malaysia	0–0	Chelsea

Sarawak Stadium, Kuching

12 August 2007

Bayern Munich	1–1	Chelsea
Bopp 35'	Report	Sawyer 1'

Sarawak Stadium, Kuching

12 August 2007

Malaysia	0–2	PSV
	Report	Wuytens 11'; Huttens 22'

Cheras Stadium, Kuala Lumpur

== Knockout stage ==
Quarter-finals
14 August - Shah Alam Stadium
(Brazil) Flamengo	1
(Netherlands) PSV	0
15 August - Shah Alam Stadium
(Spain) Barcelona	0
(England) Manchester United	1
14 August – Shah Alam Stadium
(Germany) Bayern Munich	0
(Italy) Milan	2
15 August – Shah Alam Stadium
(Italy) Internazionale	0
(Italy) Juventus	2

Semi-finals
17 August - National Stadium
(Brazil) Flamengo	1
(England) Manchester United	2
17 August - National Stadium
(Italy) Milan	1
(Italy) Juventus	2

Final
19 August - National Stadium
(England) Manchester United	1
(Italy) Juventus	0
Third place
19 August - National Stadium
(Brazil) Flamengo	3
(Italy) Milan	1

=== Quarter finals ===
14 August 2007

Flamengo	1–0	PSV
Flores 70'	Report

Shah Alam Stadium, Kuala Lumpur

14 August 2007

Bayern Munich	0–2	Milan
	Report	Aubameyang 20', 63'

Shah Alam Stadium, Kuala Lumpur

15 August 2007

Barcelona	0–1	Manchester United
		Lee 19'

Shah Alam Stadium, Kuala Lumpur

15 August 2007

Internazionale	0–2	Juventus
		Daud 28'; Pasquato 55'

Shah Alam Stadium, Kuala Lumpur

=== Semi finals ===
17 August 2007

Flamengo	1–2	Manchester United
Kayke 35' (pen.)	Report	Hewson 25', 63'

National Stadium, Kuala Lumpur

17 August 2007

Milan	1–2	Juventus
Aubameyang 57'	Report	Esposito 16'; Pasquato 39' (pen.)

National Stadium, Kuala Lumpur

=== Third place play-off ===
19 August 2007

Flamengo	3–1	Milan
Vander 14'; Welinton 61'; Kayke 66'	Report	Aubameyang 29'

National Stadium, Kuala Lumpur

=== Final ===
19 August 2007

Manchester United	1–0	Juventus
Brandy 50'	Report

National Stadium, Kuala Lumpur

== Top scorers ==
Name	Team	Goals
(Gabon) Pierre-Emerick Aubameyang	(Italy) Milan	7
(Brazil) Kayke	(Brazil) Flamengo	5
(Germany) Viktor Bopp	(Germany) Bayern Munich	3
(England) Febian Brandy	(England) Manchester United	3
(England) Sam Hewson	(England) Manchester United	3
