= Julien Toudic =

French footballer (born 1985)

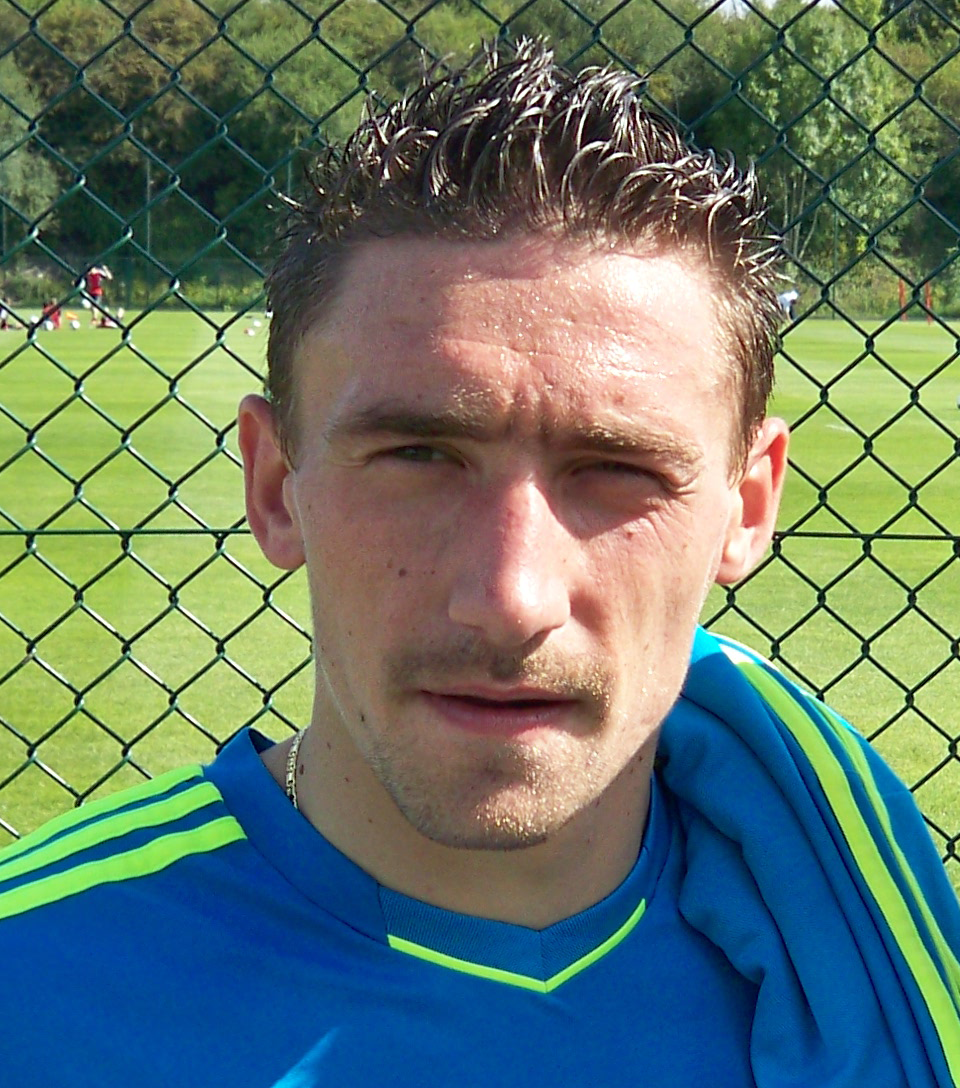
- Toudic with Lens in 2011

Personal information
- Date of birth: 19 December 1985 (age 40)
- Place of birth: Caen, France
- Height: 1.72 m (5 ft 8 in)
- Position: Striker

Senior career*
Years	Team	Apps	(Gls)
2005–2011	Caen	98	(18)
2010–2011	→ Reims (loan)	33	(16)
2011–2013	Lens	25	(8)
2012–2013	→ Reims (loan)	11	(0)
2013	Zulte Waregem	0	(0)
2013–2014	Laval	25	(2)
2014–2015	CA Bastia	30	(7)
2015–2016	Ajaccio	32	(8)
2017	Red Star	16	(5)
2018	Red Star	4	(0)
Total		274	(64)
- * Club domestic league appearances and goals

Julien Toudic (born 19 December 1985) is a French former professional footballer who played as a striker.

== Career ==
Toudic moved to AC Ajaccio in August 2015.

In 2019, he was retired.
