= Essam Mahmoud =

Egyptian footballer (born 1977)

Personal information
- Date of birth: 20 June 1977 (age 49)
- Place of birth: Egypt
- Height: 1.87 m (6 ft 2 in)
- Position: Goalkeeper

Team information
- Current team: Tersana (goalkeeper coach)

Senior career*
Years	Team	Apps	(Gls)
2000–2006	ENPPI Club		
2006–2008	Al-Ittihad Al-Sakndary	26	(0)
2008–2009	ENPPI Club	3	(0)
2009–2011	El Gouna	20	(0)
2011–2013	Wadi Degla	12	(0)
2013–2013	→ Lierse (loan)	0	(0)
2013–2014	El-Entag El-Harby	11	(0)

International career
2004–2005	Egypt		
- * Club domestic league appearances and goals

Essam Mahmoud (Arabic: عصام محمود; born 20 June 1977) is an Egyptian former professional football coach and former player who played as a goalkeeper. He is currently the goalkeeper coach of Tersana SC.

== Playing career ==
At the club level, Mahmoud plays for El Gouna of Hurghada in the Egyptian Premier League.

He was also selected as a reserve goalkeeper for the Egypt national team at the 2004 African Cup of Nations. However, he did not appear in any matches.

== Coaching career ==
After retiring at the end of the 2013–14 season, Mahmoud began as a goalkeeper coach, starting for the youth teams of ENPPI Club. He left the club in October 2016, he left the club and was hired by Tersana SC. He left the club in January 2017.

Ahead of the 2017-18 season, he was hired by Wadi Degla, still as a goalkeeper coach. However, he returned to Tersana SC in the summer 2019.

== Honours ==
ENPPI

- Egypt Cup: 2005
