= Cédric Berthelin =

French footballer (born 1976)

Personal information
- Date of birth: 25 December 1976 (age 49)
- Place of birth: Courrières, France
- Height: 1.94 m (6 ft 4 in)
- Position: Goalkeeper

Team information
- Current team: Lens (goalkeeper coach)

Youth career
- 1992–1999: Lens

Senior career*
Years	Team	Apps	(Gls)
1999–2003	Lens	0	(0)
2001–2002	→ Valence (loan)	7	(0)
2002	→ Luton Town (loan)	9	(0)
2003–2004	Crystal Palace	26	(0)
2004–2007	Mons	90	(0)
2007–2009	Dender	41	(0)
2009	R.E. Mouscron	14	(0)
2010	→ Lens B (non contract player)	0	(0)
2010–2013	Mons	53	(0)
2013	Oostende	10	(0)
Total		250	(0)
- * Club domestic league appearances and goals

Cédric Berthelin (born 25 December 1976) is a French former professional footballer and currently the goalkeeper coach of Lens.

== Career ==
Berthelin started his professional career with Lens in 1999 and spent two seasons with the sang et or (literally blood and gold) making only occasional first team appearances. During the 2001/2 season he played for ASOA Valence. Berthelin signed for Crystal Palace in January 2003 on a free transfer following a brief period at Luton Town. After six months, he was offered a two-year contract and played regularly for the first XI. An appearance at Liverpool for Crystal Palace in an FA Cup match bought him to national attention as Palace won 2–0 with Berthelin in outstanding form.

In the 2003–04 season Crystal Palace began the season with Matt Clarke in goal, but after four games he was injured and replaced by Berthelin. Berthelin however faced competition from loan signings Thomas Myhre and, later, Nico Vaesen as the season progressed. Berthelin finished the season with 17 league appearances, but it was Vaesen who started the 1st Division Play Off Final (Berthelin was on the bench). Berthelin did not make any further first team appearances for Palace during their first year back in the top division of English football and left during the season to join Mons of Belgian Jupiler League where he was appointed to the coaching team. He spent three and a half seasons with Mons from 2004 to 2007 appearing in ninety league games for them before moving to Verbroedering Dender in the Belgian Top Division aka Jupiler League in January 2008. At the start of the 2009–10 season he moved again to R.E. Mouscron.

When Mouscron collapsed in December 2009, Berthelin found himself without a club. He stopped briefly at his old club Lens where he was employed on a non contractual basis. He then joined another of his ex clubs Mons for whom he was a regular for the next three seasons and for whom he made over one hundred and thirty league appearances.

He joined Oostende at the end of the 2012–13 season as a goalkeeper coach and reserve keeper behind Mulopo Kudimbana. In the 2013–14 season he played a number of first team league games for Oostende, but after they signed Didier Ovono in November 2013, Berthelin chose to retire from playing continuing as a goalkeeper coach. Subsequently, in June 2015, he was hired as a goalkeeper coach at K.V. Kortrijk in West Flanders in Belgium.

On 1 July 2019 Berthelin signed with R. Charleroi S.C. as a goalkeeper coach. In January 2025 he took up a similar position at Lens.

== Honours ==
Crystal Palace

- Football League First Division play-offs: 2004
