= Tom Van Imschoot =

Belgian footballer and manager (born 1981)

Personal information
- Date of birth: 4 September 1981 (age 45)
- Place of birth: Tienen, Belgium
- Height: 1.80 m (5 ft 11 in)
- Position: Midfielder

Youth career
- 1995–2002: Sint-Truidense

Senior career*
| Years | Team | Apps | (Gls) |
| 2002–2005 | Sint-Truidense | 59 | (5) |
| 2005–2009 | Westerlo | 109 | (4) |
| 2009–2013 | Mons | 84 | (10) |
| 2013–2015 | Oostende | 26 | (1) |
| 2015–2016 | FC Eindhoven | 25 | (1) |
| Total | | 303 | (21) |

Managerial career
- 2016–2017: Lommel United
- 2017–2019: Lommel
- 2020–2023: Lierse Kempenzonen
- * Club domestic league appearances and goals

Tom Van Imschoot (born 4 September 1981) is a Belgian football manager and a former player.

== Career ==
=== Club ===
Tom Van Imschoot began his career with Sint-Truidense in 2002 and he played with them for three seasons, making 59 league appearances and scored 5 goals during his time at the Stayen. In 2005, Van Imschoot joined Westerlo he made his debut for Westerlo in the 2–0 win against Cercle Brugge on 6 August 2005. He went on to make 109 league appearances, scoring 4 goals during four seasons at the Het Kuipje. He then joined Mons in the summer of 2009 and was part of the squad that was promoted to the Belgian Pro League in 2010. He made 84 league appearances and scored 10 goals during his time at the Stade Charles Tondreau.
