= Geoffrey Kondogbia =

Footballer (born 1993)

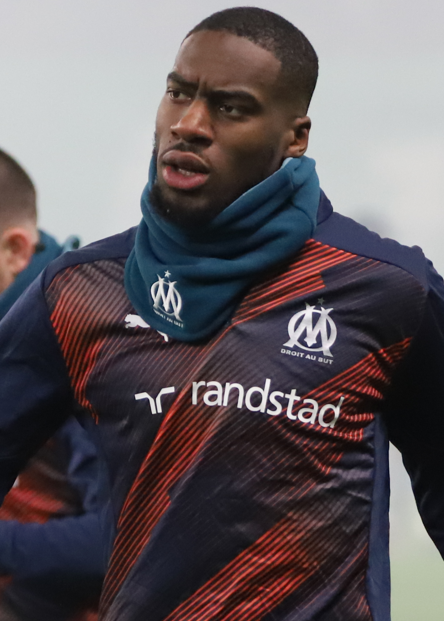
- Kondogbia warming up for Marseille in 2024

Personal information
- Full name: Geoffrey Edwin Kondogbia
- Date of birth: 15 February 1993 (age 33)
- Place of birth: Nemours, France
- Height: 1.88 m (6 ft 2 in)
- Position: Defensive midfielder

Team information
- Current team: Marseille
- Number: 19

Youth career
- 1999–2003: Nandy
- 2003–2004: Sénart-Moissy
- 2004–2010: Lens

Senior career*
Years	Team	Apps	(Gls)
2010–2011	Lens B	18	(1)
2010–2012	Lens	35	(1)
2012–2013	Sevilla	33	(1)
2013–2015	Monaco	49	(2)
2015–2018	Inter Milan	50	(2)
2017–2018	→ Valencia (loan)	31	(4)
2018–2020	Valencia	51	(2)
2020–2023	Atlético Madrid	73	(1)
2023–	Marseille	68	(0)

International career^{‡}
2008–2009	France U16	5	(1)
2009	France U17	6	(0)
2010–2011	France U18	12	(5)
2011–2012	France U19	12	(1)
2012–2013	France U20	14	(2)
2013–2014	France U21	9	(1)
2014–2016	France	5	(0)
2018–	Central African Republic	22	(3)
Medal record
Men's Football
Representing France
FIFA U-20 World Cup
Winner	2013 Turkey
- * Club domestic league appearances and goals as of 22 November 2026 ‡ National team caps and goals as of 24 March 2025

Geoffrey Edwin Kondogbia (born 15 February 1993) is a professional footballer who plays for Ligue 1 club Marseille. Born in France and he is formerly France at international level, he plays for the Central African Republic national team. Primarily a defensive midfielder, he has also played centre-back on occasion.

Kondogbia started his career at Lens, then signed with Sevilla at the age of 19. In 2013 he was bought by Monaco for €20 million, and then by Inter Milan for €31 million two years later. He returned to Spain in 2017 to play for Valencia, winning the Copa del Rey in 2019. In 2020 he moved to Atlético Madrid, winning La Liga in his first season.

Kondogbia earned 57 caps for his birth country of France across its youth levels, before making his debut for the senior team in 2014. In August 2018, he was cap-tied to the Central African Republic by switching his allegiance, and made his debut for its national team in an official match shortly after.

== Early and personal life ==
Kondogbia was born in Nemours, France, to Central African parents. He is a Muslim. He acquired French nationality on 27 March 2007, through the collective effect of his mother's naturalization.

Kondogbia's older brother, Evans, was also a footballer. He spent most of his career in Belgium, and represented the Central African Republic internationally.

== Club career ==
=== Lens ===
Kondogbia joined Lens' youth system at the age of 11. On 11 April 2010 he signed his first professional contract, agreeing to a four-year deal. He made his debut in Ligue 1 on 21 November, appearing as a late substitute against Olympique Lyonnais.

Kondogbia spent the 2011–12 season in Ligue 2 after the Sang et Or's relegation. He scored his only official goal for the team on 13 April 2012, netting the opener in a 3–0 success at Tours FC.

=== Sevilla ===
On 24 July 2012, Kondogbia signed for Spanish club Sevilla FC for an undisclosed fee, believed to be in the region of €3 million. He first appeared in La Liga on 15 September, replacing goalscorer Piotr Trochowski in the 82nd minute of the 1–0 defeat of reigning champions Real Madrid, at the Ramón Sánchez Pizjuán Stadium. He scored his first goal for the Andalusians on 28 January 2013, heading home the first for his team in an eventual 3–0 home derby win against Granada CF.

In Sevilla's semi-final second leg tie of the Copa del Rey against eventual winners Atlético Madrid, on 27 February 2013, Kondogbia picked up a red card as his team ended the match with nine men in the 2–2 home draw, and fell to a 3–4 aggregate loss.

=== Monaco ===
Kondogbia returned to the French top division on 31 August 2013, signing a five-year contract with newly promoted AS Monaco FC worth a reported €20 million. He contributed with 26 games and one goal in his first season, helping the club finish second and return to the UEFA Champions League after one decade.

In the Champions League round-of-16's first leg, on 25 February 2015, Kondogbia put his team ahead at Arsenal in an eventual 3–1 win.

=== Inter Milan ===
On 22 June 2015, Inter Milan announced that they had signed Kondogbia on a five-year deal for an initial fee of €31 million, subject to a medical, beating a reported €40m bid from city rival A.C. Milan. He scored his first goal for his new team on 8 November, the only away against Torino FC. On 14 February of the following year, he was sent off at the conclusion of a bad-tempered 1–2 loss at ACF Fiorentina for sarcastically applauding the referee; he received a two-match ban.

In June 2016, the Serie A club announced the total cost of Kondogbia was €40.501 million.

=== Valencia ===
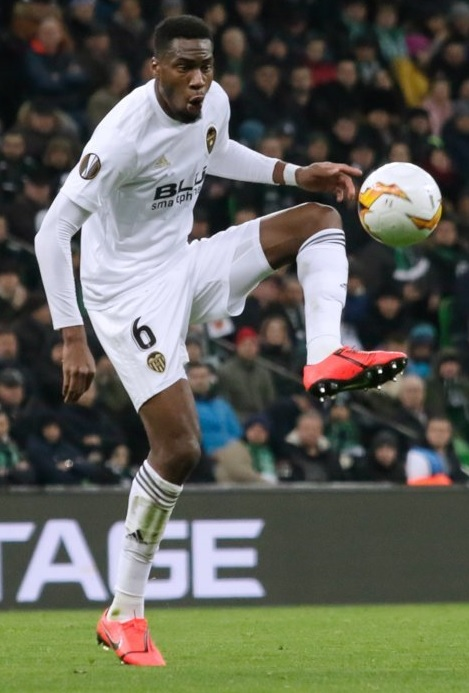
Kondogbia playing for Valencia in 2019

On 21 August 2017, Valencia CF announced that they reached an agreement with Internazionale for the loan of Kondogbia until 30 June 2018, with an option to make the deal permanent. The deal was part of a loan exchange, with João Cancelo moving in the other direction. He scored on his debut six days later, playing the full 90 minutes of an away fixture against Real Madrid and helping the team to a 2–2 draw.

On 24 May 2018, Valencia redeemed the buyout clause of Kondogbia and the player signed a four-year contract.

=== Atlético Madrid ===
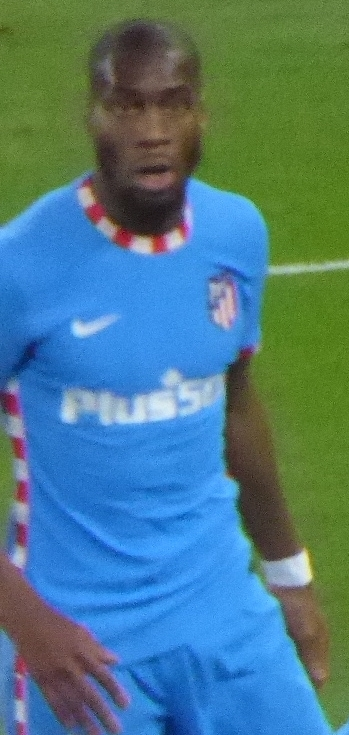
Kondogbia with Atlético Madrid in 2022

On 3 November 2020, Kondogbia joined Atlético Madrid on a four-year contract. The club was granted an exception to sign him outside of the transfer window after Arsenal had met the release clause of Thomas Partey on deadline day. He was mainly used as a substitute in his first season as the team won the league, not starting a game until February.

In 2021–22, Kondogbia played 28 league games, with only minor muscular injuries preventing more. He scored his only goal of 93 appearances for the Rojiblancos on 9 January, equalising in a 2–2 draw at Villarreal CF in which he was also sent off.

=== Marseille ===
On 30 June 2023, Kondogbia returned to Ligue 1 for the first time in eight years, signing for Olympique de Marseille for four seasons for a fee of €8 million. He made his debut on 9 August in a Champions League third qualifying round first leg away to Panathinaikos F.C. in which he was sent off; his first yellow card came within 30 seconds of kick-off.

== International career ==
=== France ===
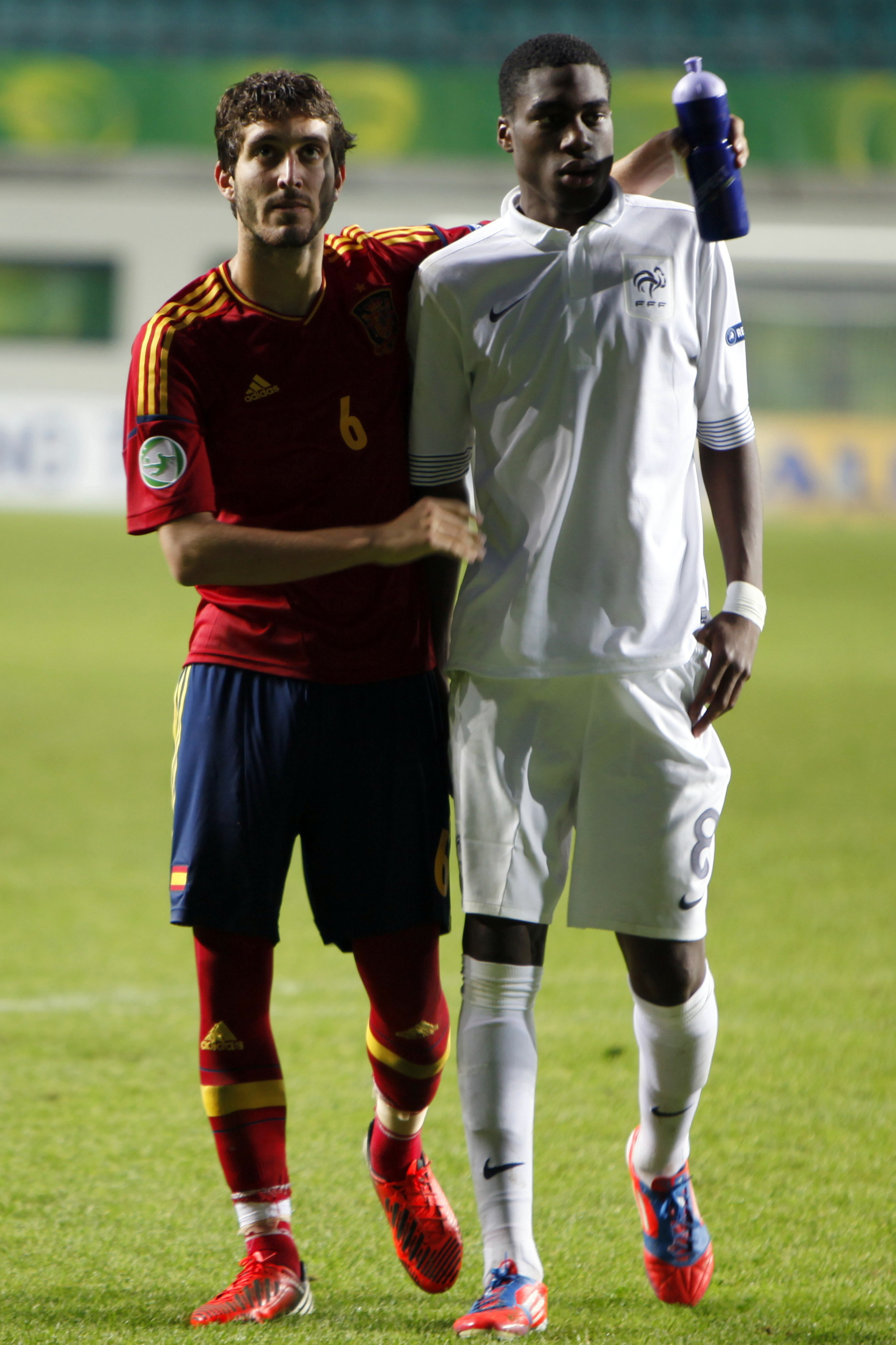
Kondogbia and Spain's José Campaña at the 2012 European Under-19 Championship

Kondogbia was selected to the French squad for the 2013 FIFA U-20 World Cup. In the nation's first group match against Ghana, on 21 June, he scored the opening goal in an eventual 3–1 victory, being chosen by some publications as man of the match for his all-around performance. He netted for the second time in the tournament against hosts Turkey in the round-of-16, leading to a 4–1 victory.

Kondogbia made his debut for the senior team on 14 August 2013 at the age of 20, playing 63 minutes in a 0–0 friendly draw away to Belgium.

=== Central African Republic ===
As all five matches he played for France at senior level were not in competitive matches, Kondogbia was never cap-tied and was thus still eligible to represent the Central African Republic, for which he qualified through his parents. He received an official call on 31 August 2018 and made his debut on 12 October, starting and acting as captain in a 4–0 away loss to Ivory Coast in a 2019 Africa Cup of Nations qualifier. On 18 November in the same competition, he scored an added-time equaliser in a 2–2 draw away to Rwanda.

== Career statistics ==
=== Club ===
As of match played 8 November 2026

Appearances and goals by club, season and competition
Club	Season	League			National cup (Note: Includes Coupe de France, Copa del Rey, Coppa Italia)		League cup (Note: Includes Coupe de la Ligue)		Europe		Other		Total	
Club	Season	Division	Apps	Goals	Apps	Goals	Apps	Goals	Apps	Goals	Apps	Goals	Apps	Goals
Lens B	2010–11	CFA	18	1	—		—		—		—		18	1
Lens	2010–11	Ligue 1	3	0	0	0	0	0	—		—		3	0
Lens	2011–12	Ligue 2	32	1	0	0	4	0	—		—		36	1
Lens	Total		35	1	0	0	4	0	—		—		39	1
Sevilla	2012–13	La Liga	31	1	6	0	—		—		—		38	1
Sevilla	2013–14	La Liga	2	0	0	0	—		1 (Note: Appearances in UEFA Europa League)	0	—		3	0
Sevilla	Total		33	1	6	0	—		1	0	—		41	1
Monaco	2013–14	Ligue 1	26	1	4	1	1	0	—		—		31	2
Monaco	2014–15	Ligue 1	23	1	2	0	0	0	8 (Note: Appearances in UEFA Champions League)	1	—		33	2
Monaco	Total		49	2	6	1	1	0	8	1	—		64	4
Inter Milan	2015–16	Serie A	26	1	4	0	—		—		—		30	1
Inter Milan	2016–17	Serie A	24	1	2	0	—		0	0	—		26	1
Inter Milan	Total		50	2	6	0	—		0	0	—		56	2
Valencia (loan)	2017–18	La Liga	31	4	5	0	—		—		—		36	4
Valencia	2018–19	La Liga	19	1	3	0	—		7 (Note: Five appearances in UEFA Champions League, two appearances in UEFA Europa League)	0	—		29	1
Valencia	2019–20	La Liga	27	1	1	0	—		5	1	1 (Note: Appearance in Supercopa de España)	0	34	2
Valencia	2020–21	La Liga	5	0	0	0	—		—		—		5	0
Valencia	Valencia total		82	6	9	0	—		12	1	1	0	104	7
Atlético Madrid	2020–21	La Liga	25	0	2	0	—		0	0	—		27	0
Atlético Madrid	2021–22	La Liga	28	1	1	0	—		9	0	1	0	39	1
Atlético Madrid	2022–23	La Liga	20	0	4	0	—		3	0	—		27	0
Atlético Madrid	Total		73	1	7	0	—		12	0	1	0	93	1
Marseille	2023–24	Ligue 1	26	0	1	0	—		14 (Note: One appearance in UEFA Champions League, thirteen appearances and one goal in UEFA Europa League)	1	—		41	1
Marseille	2024–25	Ligue 1	25	0	1	0	—		—		—		26	0
Marseille	2025–26	Ligue 1	10	0	2	0	—		4	0	1 (Note: Appearance in Trophée des Champions)	0	17	0
Marseille	2026–27	Ligue 1	6	0	0	0	—		3	0	—		9	0
Marseille	Total		67	0	4	0	—		21	1	1	0	93	1
Career total			407	14	38	1	5	0	54	3	3	0	508	18

=== International ===
As of match played 24 March 2025

Appearances and goals by national team and year
National team	Year	Apps	Goals
France	2013	1	0
France	2015	4	0
France	Total	5	0
Central African Republic	2018	3	1
Central African Republic	2020	1	0
Central African Republic	2021	4	0
Central African Republic	2023	5	2
Central African Republic	2024	7	0
Central African Republic	2025	2	0
Central African Republic	Total	22	3
Career total		27	3

As of match played 24 March 2025

Scores and results list Central African Republic goal tally first, score column indicates score after each Kondogbia goal.

List of international goals scored by Geoffrey Kondogbia
No.	Date	Venue	Opponent	Score	Result	Competition
1	18 November 2018	Stade Huye, Butare, Rwanda	Rwanda	2–2	2–2	2019 Africa Cup of Nations qualification
2	17 June 2023	Stade de la Réunification, Douala, Cameroon	Angola	1–1	1–2	2023 Africa Cup of Nations qualification
3	20 November 2023	Stade du 26 Mars, Bamako, Mali	Mali	1–1	1–1	2026 FIFA World Cup qualification

== Honours ==
Valencia

- Copa del Rey: 2018–19

Atletico Madrid

- La Liga: 2020–21

France U20

- FIFA U-20 World Cup: 2013
