= Grégory Lazitch =

Belgian footballer (born 1992)

Personal information
- Date of birth: 26 May 1992 (age 34)
- Place of birth: Charleroi, Belgium
- Height: 1.80 m (5 ft 11 in)
- Position: Left-back

Team information
- Current team: Rochefort
- Number: 26

Senior career*
Years	Team	Apps	(Gls)
2008–2013	Sporting Charleroi	16	(0)
2011–2012	→ Virton (loan)	26	(0)
2013–2015	White Star Bruxelles	10	(0)
2015	Visé	10	(1)
2015–2018	La Louvière Centre	14	(2)
2018–2022	RAAL La Louvière	60	(2)
2022–	Rochefort	85	(3)
- * Club domestic league appearances and goals as of 28 June 2026

Grégory Lazitch (born 26 May 1992) is a Belgian professional footballer who plays as a left back for Rochefort.

== Career ==
Lazitch made his Belgian Pro League debut for Sporting Charleroi as a 16-year-old on 13 December 2008 against Genk. He came on as a substitute in the 17th minute for the injured Orlando. Through three seasons, he made 16 appearances in the Pro League for the club.

After the club suffered relegation to the Second Division, Lazitch was a starter in the first two league games of the 2011–12 season against Tienen and Roeselare – but in August 2011 he was sent on loan to Virton as part of the permanent move of Harlem Gnohéré from Virton to Charleroi. After his loan spell, he was mostly a reserve under head coach Yannick Ferrera, after the club had returned to the Pro League, after which he signed a permanent deal with White Star Bruxelles in 2013.

Lazitch began playing for La Louvière Centre in 2015, and moved to RAAL La Louvière in 2018. After four years at RAAL, he joined Union Rochefortoise in 2022.
