= Leandro (footballer, born March 1985) =

Brazilian footballer

Personal information
- Full name: Leandro de Almeida Borges
- Date of birth: 31 March 1985 (age 41)
- Place of birth: São Paulo, Brazil
- Height: 1.85 m (6 ft 1 in)
- Position: Defensive midfielder

Senior career*
Years	Team	Apps	(Gls)
2005–2007	Joinville	0	(0)
2007	Beira-Mar	6	(0)
2007–2009	Figueirense	4	(0)
2008	→ Joinville (loan)	0	(0)
2009–2010	Bahia	39	(0)
2011	Mirassol	0	(0)
2011–2013	Charleroi	2	(0)
2014	São José	0	(0)
2015	Atlético Tubarão	0	(0)
2016	PSTC	4	(0)
2017	Rio Verde	0	(0)
- * Club domestic league appearances and goals

Leandro de Almeida Borges (born 31 March 1985), commonly known as Leandro, is a Brazilian footballer who plays as a midfielder. Until 2013, Leandro was playing for Charleroi in the Belgian Pro League, before being released.
