= Souleymane Diomandé =

Ivorian footballer

Personal information
- Full name: Souleymane Baba Diomandé
- Date of birth: 21 January 1992 (age 34)
- Place of birth: Marcory, Ivory Coast
- Position: Midfielder

Team information
- Current team: Hoogstraten

Youth career
- –2012: Paris

Senior career*
Years	Team	Apps	(Gls)
2012–2013	Paris	18	(2)
2013–2016	Lierse	25	(1)
2018–	Hoogstraten		
- * Club domestic league appearances and goals as of 21 March 2016

Souleymane Baba Diomandé (born 21 January 1992) is an Ivorian professional football player who is currently playing as a midfielder for Hoogstraten in the Belgian Second Amateur Division.

== Club career ==
He made his debut for Lierse on 14 September 2013 in the Jan Breydel Stadion against Club Brugge. He substituted Julien Vercauteren after 57 minutes and delivered an assist to Rachid Bourabia.

== Statistics ==
Season	Club	Competition	App.	Goals
2012-13	Paris FC	Championnat National	18	2
2013-14	Lierse SK	Belgian Pro League	25	1

Updated as of 16 December 2013.
