= Rachid Farssi =

Belgian footballer

Personal information
- Date of birth: 15 January 1985 (age 41)
- Place of birth: Chênée, Belgium
- Height: 1.80 m (5 ft 11 in)
- Position: Midfielder

Team information
- Current team: FAR Rabat

Senior career*
Years	Team	Apps	(Gls)
2004–2005	Visé	30	(1)
2005–2007	Eupen	65	(9)
2007–2012	Westerlo	114	(9)
2012–2013	Waasland-Beveren	0	(0)
2013–2015	Lierse	8	(0)
2015–	FAR Rabat		
- * Club domestic league appearances and goals as of 22 November 2015

Rachid Farssi (born 15 January 1985) is a Belgian football player currently playing for FAR Rabat.
