= Ahmed Abou Moslem =

Egyptian footballer (born 1981)

Personal information
- Full name: Ahmed Abou Moslem Farag
- Date of birth: 25 July 1981 (age 45)
- Place of birth: Cairo, Egypt
- Height: 1.70 m (5 ft 7 in)
- Position: Left-back

Youth career
- Dina Farms

Senior career*
Years	Team	Apps	(Gls)
–2001	Dina Farms		
2001–2005	El Ahly	16	(2)
2005–2009	RC Strasbourg	30	(0)
2009	→ AC Ajaccio (loan)	13	(0)
2009–2010	Ismaily	4	(0)
2010–2011	El-Entag El-Harby	26	(2)
2011–2012	Smouha	10	(0)
2012–2013	Lierse SK	10	(1)

International career^{‡}
?	Egypt U-20	?	(?)
2004–2007	Egypt	9	(0)
- * Club domestic league appearances and goals as of 4 November 2012 (UTC) ‡ National team caps and goals as of 9 January 2006

Ahmed Abou Moslem Farag (Arabic: أحمد أبو مسلم فرج ; born 25 July 1981 in Cairo) is an Egyptian former footballer who played as a left back.

== Club career ==
=== Early career ===
Ahmed Abou Moslem started his career at Dina Farms in Egypt. He was selected to represent the Egypt national under-20 football team in the 2001 FIFA World Youth Championship. He helped Egypt win the bronze medal. Due to his success, he joined El Ahly where he spent four years.

=== France move ===
Abou Moslem joined the French side Strasbourg in 2005. In January 2009, Abou Moslem Joined French side AC Ajaccio for a six months loan deal.

==== European offers ====
Abou was close to signing with several European clubs during his time in France. Strasbourg rejected offers from Crystal Palace, PAOK, and Hamburg SV.

=== Return to Egypt ===
In July 2009, Abou Moslem returned to Egypt. He joined Egyptian Premier League side Ismaily with a three years Contract. However, Abo Moslem failed to establish himself in the first team. Therefore, he terminated his contract with mutual consent after spending only one season at the club. On 1 July 2010, it was announced that Abou Moslem joined El-Entag El-Harby (a.k.a. Military Production). He penned a 3-year contract with the club.

== International career ==
He was selected to represent the Egypt national under-20 football team in the 2001 FIFA World Youth Championship. Egypt reached the semifinals and won the bronze medal and also came 3rd in the U-20 African Nations Cup.

== Honours ==
=== Al Ahly ===
- CAF Champions League: 2001, 2005.
- Egyptian League: 2004-05.
- Section of Egypt: 2003.
- Section of Egypt Finalist: 2004.

=== Strasbourg ===
- Ligue 2: 2006-07 (won promotion, 3rd place).

=== Egypt U-20 ===
- 2001 FIFA World Youth Championship: Bronze Medal.
- 2001 African Youth Championship: Bronze Medal.
