= Seydina Diarra =

Belgian-Malian footballer

Personal information
- Full name: Seydina Bahnou Diarra
- Date of birth: 1 April 1994 (age 32)
- Place of birth: Brussels, Belgium
- Height: 1.74 m (5 ft 9 in)
- Position: Midfielder

Team information
- Current team: Napoli United

Youth career
- 2000–2013: Anderlecht

Senior career*
Years	Team	Apps	(Gls)
2012–2013	Anderlecht II		
2013–2015	NEC	7	(0)
2017–2018	Eendracht Aalst	23	(0)
2018	Vereya	9	(0)
2019	RWDM	9	(0)
2019–2020	Tempo Overijse		
2020–	Napoli United		
- * Club domestic league appearances and goals as of 17:56, 24 October 2019 (UTC)

Seydina Bahnou Diarra (born 1 April 1994 in Brussels) is a Belgian-Malian professional football player who plays as a midfielder for Napoli United in Italy.

== Career ==
He made his professional debut on 3 August 2013 against FC Groningen. He joined N.E.C. in July 2013 from Anderlecht.

Napoli United.

== Honours ==
=== Club ===
NEC

- Eerste Divisie (1): 2014–15
