= Jamaïque Vandamme =

Belgian footballer

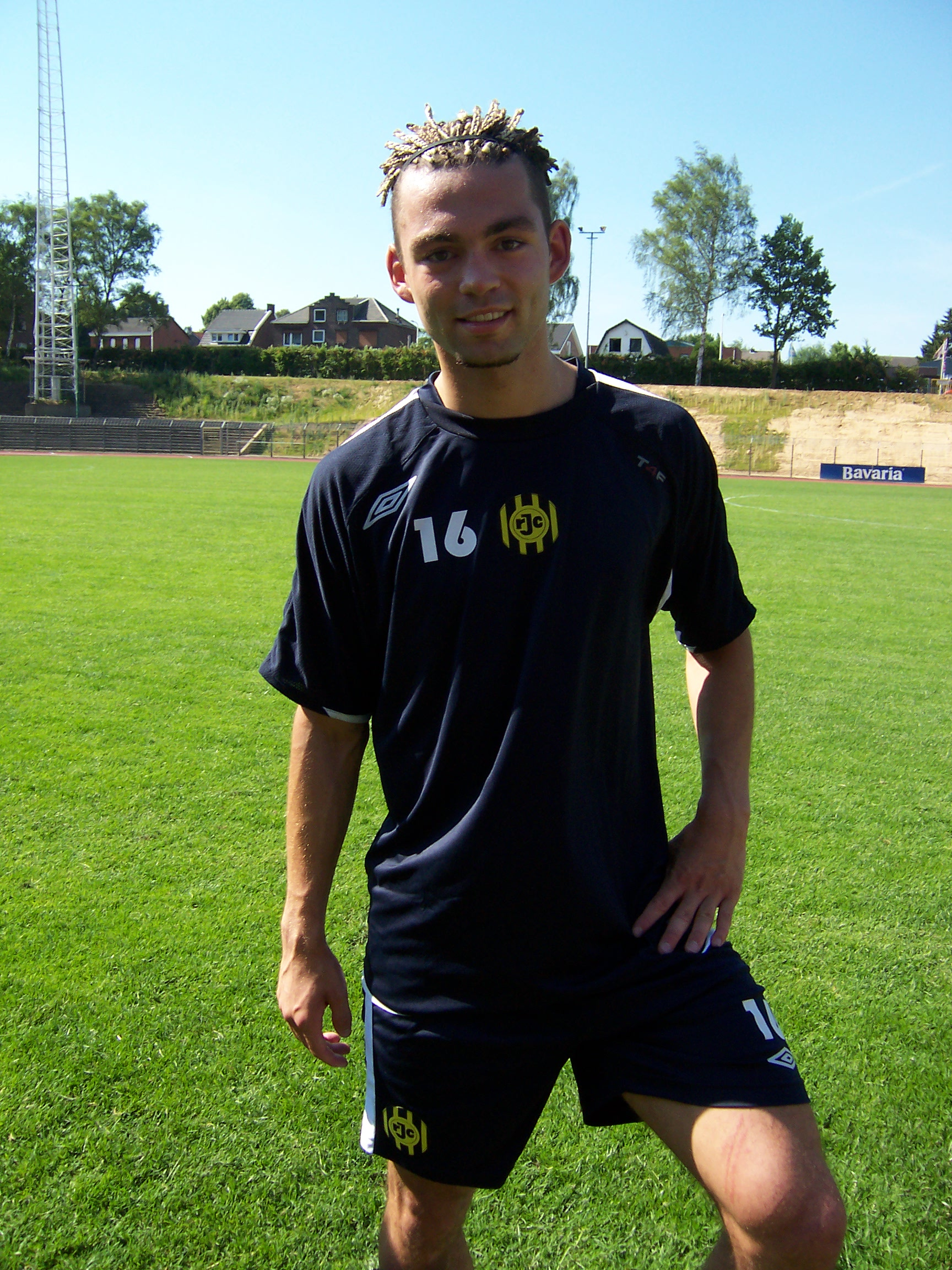

Personal information
- Full name: Jamaïque Vandamme
- Date of birth: 1 August 1985 (age 41)
- Place of birth: Ostend, Belgium
- Height: 1.83 m (6 ft 0 in)
- Positions: Winger; forward

Youth career
- HO Oostende
- Club Brugge
- Anderlecht

Senior career*
Years	Team	Apps	(Gls)
2004–2006	Roeselare	34	(5)
2006–2010	Roda JC	35	(3)
2010–2011	RAEC Mons	1	(0)
2011–2013	Oostende	60	(13)
2013–2014	Union SG	27	(1)
2014–2015	Torhout	22	(3)
2015–2016	Deinze	22	(6)
2016–2017	KVV Coxyde	20	(10)
2017–2018	VW Hamme	18	(2)
2018–2019	KFC Mandel United		
2019–2020	KFC Sparta Petegem		

Managerial career
- 2016–2017: KVV Coxyde (player-manager)
- 2017–2018: VW Hamme (player-manager)
- 2020: Roeselare (assistant)
- * Club domestic league appearances and goals as of 12:26, 23 November 2019 (UTC)

Jamaïque Vandamme (born 1 August 1985 in Ostend) is a Belgian retired footballer who played as a winger. Since retiring from professional football, he has transitioned into a new role and is currently working as a Microsoft 365 consultant at Xylos NV.

== Career ==
He made his debut in professional football, being part of the KSV Roeselare squad in the 2004–05 season. He signed for Mons in July 2010. but joins KV Oostende (Division 2) for the season 2011-2012 and 2012–2013. In June 2013 it was announced that he would play for Royale Union Saint-Gilloise for the 2013–2014 season.

== Coaching career ==
Vandamme joined KVV Coxyde in the summer 2016. In October, the club struggled financially and head coach Hugo Vandenheede decided to resign, why Vandamme was announced as a player-manager for the club. In April 2017 it was confirmed, that he would join K.F.C. Vigor Wuitens Hamme ahead of the 2017–18 season, this time as a playing manager from the beginning of the season.

In the summer 2020, Vandamme retired as a player. On 20 July 2020, he was appointed assistant coach at his former club, K.S.V. Roeselare, under newly appointed head coach Karel Fraeye. He left the club alongside the coach in September 2020, because the club Roeselare was bankrupt.
