= Niels Mestdagh =

Belgian footballer (born 1993)

Personal information
- Date of birth: 3 January 1993 (age 33)
- Place of birth: Bredene, Belgium
- Height: 1.77 m (5 ft 10 in)
- Position: Left-back

Team information
- Current team: Oudenaarde
- Number: 25

Youth career
- KSV Bredene
- Cercle Brugge

Senior career*
Years	Team	Apps	(Gls)
2011–2015	Cercle Brugge	6	(0)
2013–2014	→ Hamme (loan)	31	(0)
2014–2015	→ Coxyde (loan)	34	(1)
2015–2016	Coxyde	31	(0)
2016–2019	Knokke	43	(1)
2019–2020	Torhout		
2020–2021	Mandel United	2	(0)
2021–2022	Lokeren-Temse	22	(0)
2022–	Oudenaarde	88	(0)

International career
2011–2012	Belgium U19	7	(0)
2012	Belgium U20	2	(0)
- * Club domestic league appearances and goals as of 11:05, 22 January 2026 (UTC)

Niels Mestdagh (born 3 January 1993) is a Belgian footballer who plays as a left-back for Belgian Division 2 club Oudenaarde.
