= Samuel Fabris =

Belgian footballer

Personal information
- Date of birth: 30 January 1991 (age 35)
- Place of birth: Sambreville, Belgium
- Height: 1.76 m (5 ft 9 in)
- Position: Midfielder

Youth career
- Charleroi

Senior career*
Years	Team	Apps	(Gls)
2008–2013	Charleroi	51	(0)
2013–2016	WS Brussels	58	(2)
2016–2017	Cercle Brugge	8	(0)
2017–2020	Virton	33	(0)
2019–2020	→ Eendracht Aalst (loan)	14	(0)
2020–????	Eendracht Aalst		
- * Club domestic league appearances and goals as of 16 January 2026

Samuel Fabris (born 30 January 1991) is a Belgian professional footballer who plays as a midfielder.

== Career ==
Fabris made his senior debut for Charleroi in the 2008–09 season.
