= Robin Henkens =

Belgian footballer (born 1988)

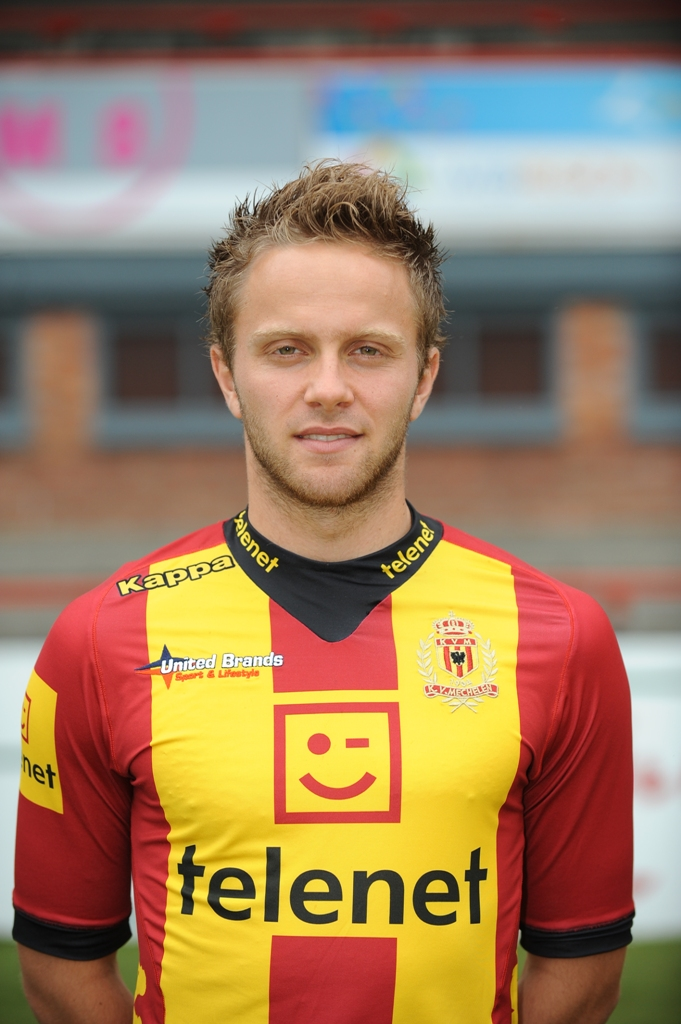

Personal information
- Date of birth: 12 September 1988 (age 38)
- Place of birth: Hasselt, Belgium
- Height: 1.74 m (5 ft 9 in)
- Position: Midfielder

Team information
- Current team: Lommel (assistant coach)

Youth career
- 1993–1999: Eendracht Stevoort
- 1999–2007: Genk

Senior career*
| Years | Team | Apps | (Gls) |
| 2007–2009 | Genk | 0 | (0) |
| 2009 | → KVSK United (loan) | 13 | (1) |
| 2009–2011 | KVSK United / Lommel United | 79 | (12) |
| 2011–2013 | Mechelen | 35 | (4) |
| 2013–2015 | Waasland-Beveren | 57 | (4) |
| 2015–2017 | Westerlo | 33 | (1) |
| 2018–2024 | Lommel | 127 | (7) |

Managerial career
- 2024–2025: Roda JC (assistant)
- 2025–: Lommel (assistant)
- * Club domestic league appearances and goals

Robin Henkens (born 12 September 1988) is a Belgian football coach and a former midfielder who is an assistant coach with Lommel.

== Career ==
As of December 2008 he was contracted to Genk, but was being linked to a move to STVV. However, in February 2009 he was loaned from Genk to Kvsk United until the end of the season.

In August 2009, he made a permanent move to KVSK United, and in the 2009–10 season he played 32 league games for them in the Belgian Second Division. As of the 2010–11 season KVSK United changed their name to Lommel United.

He moved to KV Mechelen for 2011–12, and made 10 appearances for them in his first season. In April 2013 it was announced that he would be joining Waasland-Beveren for the 2013–14 season.

In 2013/14 he made 33 league appearances for Waasland, scoring 4 goals. His contract at the club ended in summer 2015.

In December 2015 he was signed by Westerlo, having been a free agent.
