= Seweryn Michalski =

Polish footballer (born 1994)

Personal information
- Full name: Seweryn Michalski
- Date of birth: 12 September 1994 (age 32)
- Place of birth: Bełchatów, Poland
- Height: 1.92 m (6 ft 4 in)
- Position: Centre-back

Youth career
- –2012: GKS Bełchatów

Senior career*
Years	Team	Apps	(Gls)
2013	GKS Bełchatów	15	(2)
2013–2014	Mechelen	1	(0)
2014	→ Jagiellonia Białystok (loan)	1	(0)
2014–2016	GKS Bełchatów	33	(3)
2016–2018	Chrobry Głogów	49	(3)
2018–2020	Chojniczanka Chojnice	29	(4)
2020–2021	GKS Bełchatów	16	(0)
2021–2022	Wieczysta Kraków	40	(12)
2022–2024	Warta Sieradz	42	(11)
Total		226	(35)

International career
2013	Poland U19	2	(0)
2014	Poland U20	1	(0)
2013	Poland U21	1	(0)
- * Club domestic league appearances and goals

Seweryn Michalski (born 12 September 1994) is a Polish former professional footballer who played as a centre-back.

== Club career ==
He began his club career with his hometown club GKS Bełchatów before moving to Belgian side K.V. Mechelen on 25 June 2013.

On 12 August 2020 he returned to GKS Bełchatów on a one-year contract. On 19 January 2021, he joined Wieczysta Kraków. On 27 July 2022, he left the club by mutual consent.

On 27 August 2022, he was announced to be joining III liga side Warta Sieradz, making his debut on the same day in a goalless draw against Sokół Ostróda. He retired in early 2024 due to health issues, with an intention to become a youth coach.

== Honours ==
Wieczysta Kraków

- IV liga Lesser Poland West: 2021–22
- Regional league Kraków II: 2020–21
- Polish Cup (Lesser Poland regionals): 2020–21, 2021–22
