= Evans Kondogbia =

Footballer (born 1989)

Personal information
- Date of birth: 3 May 1989 (age 37)
- Place of birth: Nemours, France
- Height: 1.89 m (6 ft 2 in)
- Position: Forward

Senior career*
Years	Team	Apps	(Gls)
2007–2009	Lorient	0	(0)
2009–2010	Hamoir	24	(9)
2010–2011	Sprimont-Comblain	8	(3)
2011–2013	Liège	5	(0)
2013–2014	Charleroi	0	(0)
2014	→ Racing Mechelen (loan)	11	(0)
2014–2015	Arles-Avignon	1	(0)
2015–2016	Renate	5	(0)
2016	Jumilla	6	(0)
2016	Foligno	0	(0)
2016–2017	Seregno	5	(0)
Total		65	(12)

International career
2010–2015	Central African Republic	6	(0)
- * Club domestic league appearances and goals

Evans Kondogbia (born 3 May 1989) is a former professional footballer who plays as a forward. Born in France, he made six appearances for the Central African Republic national team.

== Career ==
Born in Nemours, France, Kondogbia has played club football for Lorient, Hamoir, Sprimont-Comblain, Liège, Charleroi, Racing Mechelen and Arles-Avignon.

He made his international debut for Central African Republic in 2010.

On 22 July 2015, Kondogbia signed for Italian Lega Pro club Renate.

== Personal life ==
His younger brother Geoffrey Kondogbia is also a footballer.
