= Jimmy De Jonghe =

Belgian footballer

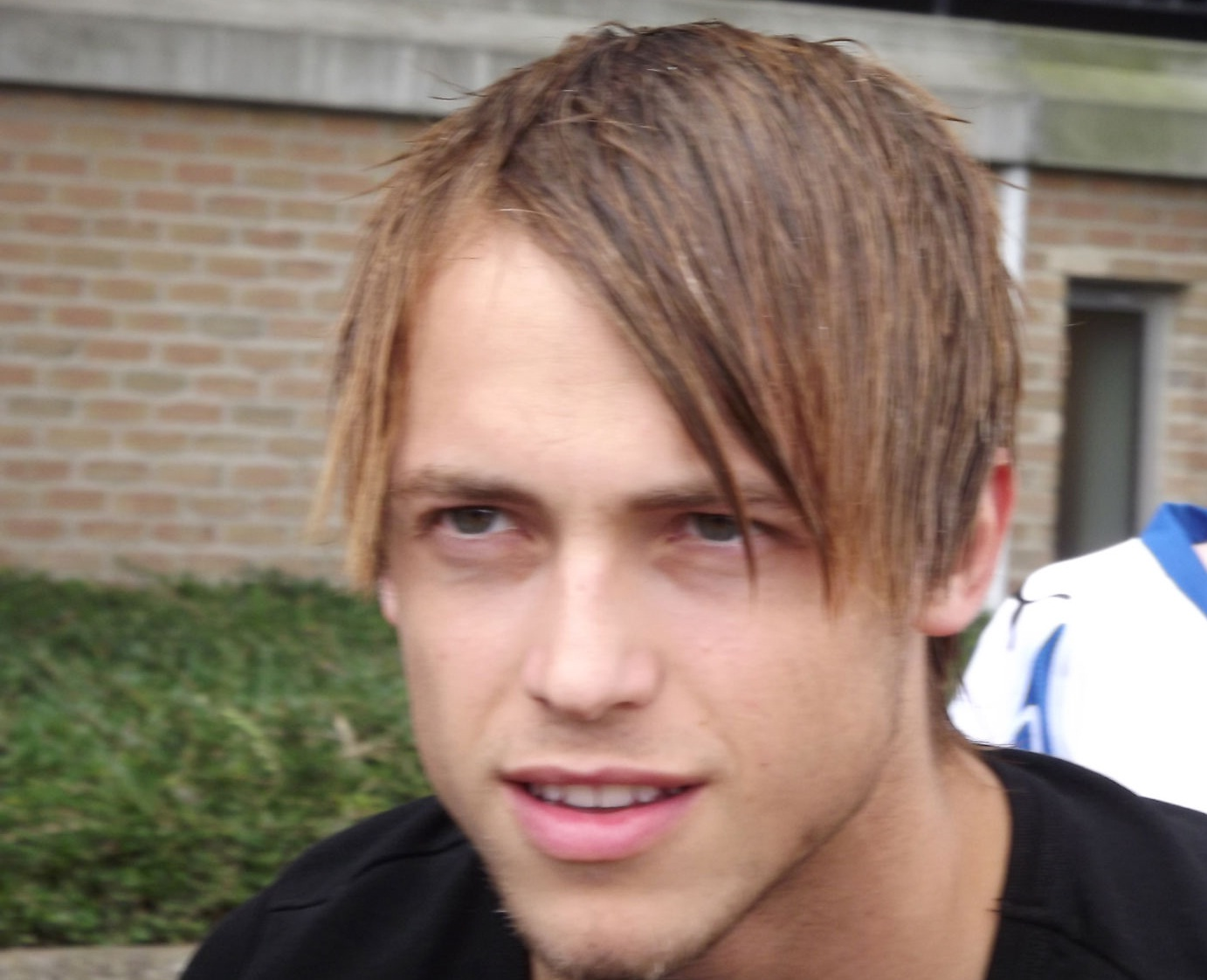

Personal information
- Full name: Jimmy Ronie Rudy De Jonghe
- Date of birth: 13 February 1992 (age 34)
- Place of birth: Boechout, Belgium
- Height: 1.71 m (5 ft 7 in)
- Position: Left-back

Team information
- Current team: KVC Wilrijk
- Number: 28

Senior career*
Years	Team	Apps	(Gls)
2010–2016	Club Brugge	13	(0)
2012–2013	→ Zulte Waregem (loan)	6	(0)
2013–2014	→ Lierse (loan)	11	(0)
2014–2015	→ Roeselare (loan)	29	(3)
2015–2016	→ Beerschot Wilrijk (loan)	31	(5)
2016–2019	Beerschot Wilrijk	121	(9)
2019–2020	Lokeren	24	(0)
2021–2022	Argeș Pitești	15	(0)
2022–2023	Thes Sport	18	(0)
2023–	KVC Wilrijk		

International career
2007	Belgium U15	2	(0)
2007–2008	Belgium U16	11	(1)
2008–2009	Belgium U17	12	(0)
2009–2010	Belgium U18	8	(1)
2010–2011	Belgium U19	3	(1)
2011–2012	Belgium U21	5	(1)
- * Club domestic league appearances and goals as of 15 January 2025

Jimmy Ronie Rudy De Jonghe (born 13 February 1992) is a Belgian professional footballer who plays as a left-back for KVC Wilrijk.
