= Jannes Vansteenkiste =

Belgian footballer (born 1993)

Personal information
- Date of birth: 17 February 1993 (age 33)
- Place of birth: Lendelede, Belgium
- Height: 1.75 m (5 ft 9 in)
- Position: Left-back

Team information
- Current team: Gullegem
- Number: 5

Youth career
- 1998–2001: FC Lendelede
- 2001–2008: SV Roeselare
- 2008–2011: Club Brugge

Senior career*
Years	Team	Apps	(Gls)
2011–2013	Club Brugge	2	(0)
2013–2017	Royal Antwerp	91	(1)
2017–2019	Roda JC	56	(2)
2019–2025	Deinze	97	(3)
2025–	Gullegem	13	(0)

International career
2008–2009	Belgium U16	6	(1)
2009–2010	Belgium U17	15	(1)
2010–2011	Belgium U18	6	(0)
2011–2012	Belgium U19	6	(0)
2012	Belgium U20	1	(0)
- * Club domestic league appearances and goals as of 11:49, 22 January 2026 (UTC)

Jannes Vansteenkiste (born 17 February 1993) is a Belgian professional footballer who plays as a left back for Gullegem.

== Career ==
Vansteenkiste left the Deinze in December 2024 after the club was declared bankrupt and ceased operations.
