= Viktor Bopp =

German footballer

Personal information
- Date of birth: 31 October 1989 (age 36)
- Place of birth: Kyiv, Ukrainian SSR
- Height: 1.80 m (5 ft 11 in)
- Position: Midfielder

Youth career
- 1997–2008: Bayern Munich

Senior career*
| Years | Team | Apps | (Gls) |
| 2008–2009 | Bayern Munich II | 9 | (3) |
| 2009–2011 | Hannover 96 II | 36 | (3) |
| 2011–2013 | Charleroi | 19 | (1) |
| 2014 | Wacker Burghausen | 10 | (1) |
| Total | | 74 | (8) |

International career
| 2006–2007 | Germany U18 | 6 | (1) |
| 2008 | Germany U19 | 1 | (0) |
| 2009 | Germany U20 | 1 | (0) |
- * Club domestic league appearances and goals

Viktor Bopp (born 31 October 1989) is a former professional footballer who played as a midfielder. Born in Ukraine, he represented Germany at the youth level.

== Personal life ==
He is the younger brother of Eugen Bopp.
