= 2024–25 Olympique de Marseille season =

Olympique de Marseille
2024–25 season
- President: Pablo Longoria
- Head coach: Roberto De Zerbi
- Stadium: Stade Vélodrome
- Ligue 1: 2nd
- Coupe de France: Round of 32
- Top goalscorer: League: Mason Greenwood (21); All: Mason Greenwood (22)
- Average home league attendance: 63,682
| Home colours | Away colours | Third colours |

The 2024–25 season was the 125th season in the history of Olympique de Marseille, and the club's 29th consecutive season in Ligue 1. In addition to the domestic league, the club participated in the Coupe de France.

This was Marseille's first season under new head coach Roberto De Zerbi, and their first without participation in European competition since 2019–20.

== Players ==
=== First-team squad ===
As of 11 February 2025

Note: Flags indicate national team as defined under FIFA eligibility rules; some limited exceptions apply. Players may hold more than one non-FIFA nationality.

| No. | Pos. | Nation | Player |
|---|---|---|---|
| 1 | GK | ARG | Gerónimo Rulli |
| 3 | DF | FRA | Quentin Merlin |
| 4 | DF | ITA | Luiz Felipe |
| 5 | DF | ARG | Leonardo Balerdi (captain) |
| 6 | DF | SUI | Ulisses Garcia |
| 8 | FW | FRA | Neal Maupay (on loan from Everton) |
| 9 | FW | ALG | Amine Gouiri |
| 10 | FW | JAM | Mason Greenwood |
| 11 | MF | MAR | Amine Harit |
| 12 | GK | NED | Jeffrey de Lange |
| 13 | DF | CAN | Derek Cornelius |
| 14 | FW | CMR | Faris Moumbagna |
| 17 | FW | ENG | Jonathan Rowe (on loan from Norwich City) |

| No. | Pos. | Nation | Player |
|---|---|---|---|
| 19 | MF | CAF | Geoffrey Kondogbia |
| 21 | MF | FRA | Valentin Rongier |
| 22 | MF | ALG | Ismaël Bennacer (on loan from Milan) |
| 23 | MF | DEN | Pierre-Emile Højbjerg (vice-captain; on loan from Tottenham Hotspur) |
| 25 | MF | FRA | Adrien Rabiot |
| 26 | MF | MAR | Bilal Nadir |
| 29 | DF | ESP | Pol Lirola |
| 36 | GK | ESP | Rubén Blanco |
| 44 | FW | BRA | Luis Henrique |
| 48 | FW | FRA | Keyliane Abdallah |
| 62 | DF | PAN | Michael Amir Murillo |
| 77 | DF | BIH | Amar Dedić |
| 99 | DF | COD | Chancel Mbemba |

=== Out on loan ===
Note: Flags indicate national team as defined under FIFA eligibility rules; some limited exceptions apply. Players may hold more than one non-FIFA nationality.

| No. | Pos. | Nation | Player |
|---|---|---|---|
| — | GK | ESP | Pau López (at Toluca until 30 June 2025) |
| — | GK | CMR | Simon Ngapandouetnbu (at Nîmes until 30 June 2025) |
| — | DF | FRA | Samuel Gigot (at Lazio until 30 June 2025) |
| — | DF | CIV | Bamo Meïté (at Montpellier until 30 June 2025) |

| No. | Pos. | Nation | Player |
|---|---|---|---|
| — | MF | CAN | Ismaël Koné (at Rennes until 30 June 2025) |
| — | MF | CMR | François Mughe (at Athens Kallithea until 30 June 2025) |
| — | MF | MAR | Azzedine Ounahi (at Panathinaikos until 30 June 2025) |

== Transfers ==
=== In ===
| Pos. | Player | Transferred from | Fee | Date | Source |
|---|---|---|---|---|---|
| DF | (Ivory Coast) Bamo Meïté | (France) Lorient | €10,000,000 | 1 July 2024 | |
| MF | (Canada) Ismaël Koné | (England) Watford | €17,500,000 | 1 July 2024 | |
| DF | (France) Lilian Brassier | (France) Brest | Loan | 3 July 2024 | |
| FW | (England) Mason Greenwood | (England) Manchester United | €26,000,000 | 18 July 2024 | |
| MF | (Denmark) Pierre-Emile Højbjerg | (England) Tottenham Hotspur | Loan | 22 July 2024 | |
| DF | (Canada) Derek Cornelius | (Sweden) Malmö FF | €4,300,000 | 4 August 2024 | |
| MF | (Argentina) Valentín Carboni | (Italy) Inter Milan | Loan | 7 August 2024 | |
| GK | (Netherlands) Jeffrey de Lange | (Netherlands) Go Ahead Eagles | €2,000,000 | 8 August 2024 | |
| GK | (Argentina) Gerónimo Rulli | (Netherlands) Ajax | €3,000,000 | 12 August 2024 | |
| FW | (France) Elye Wahi | (France) Lens | €25,000,000 | 13 August 2024 | |
| FW | (England) Jonathan Rowe | (England) Norwich City | Loan | 23 August 2024 | |
| FW | (France) Neal Maupay | (England) Everton | Loan | 30 August 2024 | |
| MF | (France) Adrien Rabiot | Unattached | Free | 17 September 2024 | |
| DF | (Italy) Luiz Felipe | Unattached | Free | 7 January 2025 | |
| FW | (Algeria) Amine Gouiri | (France) Rennes | €19,000,000 | 31 January 2025 | |
| DF | (Bosnia and Herzegovina) Amar Dedić | (Austria) Red Bull Salzburg | Loan (€1,500,000) | 3 February 2025 | |
| MF | (Algeria) Ismaël Bennacer | (Italy) Milan | Loan (€1,000,000) | 3 February 2025 | |

=== Out ===
| Pos. | Player | Transferred to | Fee | Date | Source |
|---|---|---|---|---|---|
| FW | (Argentina) Joaquín Correa | (Italy) Inter Milan | End of loan | 30 June 2024 | |
| MF | (France) Mattéo Guendouzi | (Italy) Lazio | €13,000,000 | 1 July 2024 | |
| FW | (Portugal) Vitinha | (Italy) Genoa | €16,000,000 | 1 July 2024 | |
| FW | (France) Salim Ben Seghir | (Switzerland) Xamax | End of contract | 1 July 2024 | |
| MF | (Senegal) Pape Gueye | (Spain) Villarreal | End of contract | 1 July 2024 | |
| MF | (Senegal) Iliman Ndiaye | (England) Everton | Undisclosed | 3 July 2024 | |
| DF | (France) Jonathan Clauss | (France) Nice | €5,000,000 | 25 July 2024 | |
| FW | (Senegal) Ismaïla Sarr | (England) Crystal Palace | €15,000,000 | 1 August 2024 | |
| GK | (Cameroon) Simon Ngapandouetnbu | (France) Nîmes | Loan | 14 August 2024 | |
| GK | (Spain) Pau López | (Spain) Girona | Loan | 16 August 2024 | |
| DF | (France) Samuel Gigot | (Italy) Lazio | Loan | 30 August 2024 | |
| MF | (Morocco) Azzedine Ounahi | (Greece) Panathinaikos | Loan | 4 September 2024 | |
| MF | (France) Jordan Veretout | (France) Lyon | €4,000,000 | 5 September 2024 | |
| MF | (Cameroon) François Mughe | (Greece) Athens Kallithea | Loan | 16 January 2025 | |
| FW | (France) Enzo Sternal | (Belgium) Anderlecht | Undisclosed | 17 January 2025 | |
| FW | (France) Elye Wahi | (Germany) Eintracht Frankfurt | €26,000,000 | 24 January 2025 | |
| MF | (England) Emran Soglo | (Austria) Sturm Graz | Undisclosed | 30 January 2025 | |
| DF | (France) Lilian Brassier | (France) Brest | Loan terminated | 31 January 2025 | |
| GK | (Spain) Pau López | (Mexico) Toluca | Loan | 2 February 2025 | |
| DF | (Ivory Coast) Bamo Meïté | (France) Montpellier | Loan | 3 February 2025 | |
| MF | (Canada) Ismaël Koné | (France) Rennes | Loan (€1,000,000) | 3 February 2025 | |
| MF | (Argentina) Valentín Carboni | (Italy) Inter Milan | Loan terminated | 11 February 2025 | |

Notes

1. ^{†} Loan transfer made permanent

== Friendlies ==
=== Pre-season ===
| 21 July 2024 Friendly | Marseille | 0–2 | Nîmes | Marseille, France |
| 18:00 CEST (UTC+2) | | Report | Camara 41'; Amara 49' | Stadium: La Commanderie |

| 24 July 2024 Friendly | Marseille | 3–0 | Toulon | Marseille, France |
| 18:00 CEST (UTC+2) | Kondogbia 38'; Harit 59' (pen.); Abdallah 70' | Report | Diallo (penalty missed) 78' | Stadium: La Commanderie |

| 27 July 2024 Friendly | Marseille | 3–0 | Pau | Marseille, France |
| 18:00 CEST (UTC+2) | Greenwood 31'; Luis Henrique 64'; Bakola 89' | Report | | Stadium: La Commanderie |

| 3 August 2024 Friendly | Sunderland | 2–2 | Marseille | Bradford, England |
| 15:00 BST (UTC+1) | Cirkin 51'; Aouchiche 83' (pen.) | Report | Moumbagna 27'; Koné 59' | Stadium: Valley Parade |

| 10 August 2024 Friendly | FC Augsburg | 1–3 | Marseille | Augsburg, Germany |
| 17:00 CEST (UTC+2) | Gouweleeuw 44' | Report | Luis Henrique 20'; Greenwood 21'; Harit 73' (pen.) | Stadium: Augsburg Arena; Attendance: 15,378 |

== Competitions ==
=== Overall record ===
| Competition | First match | Last match | Starting round | Final position | Record | | | | | | | |
| Competition | First match | Last match | Starting round | Final position | Pld | W | D | L | GF | GA | GD | Win % |
|---|---|---|---|---|---|---|---|---|---|---|---|---|
| Ligue 1 | 18 August 2024 | 17 May 2025 | Matchday 1 | 2nd | 34 | 20 | 5 | 9 | 74 | 47 | +27 | 58.82 |
| Coupe de France | 22 December 2024 | 14 January 2025 | Round of 64 | Round of 32 | 2 | 1 | 1 | 0 | 5 | 1 | +4 | 50.00 |
| Total | | | | | 36 | 21 | 6 | 9 | 79 | 48 | +31 | 58.33 |

Source: Soccerway

=== Ligue 1 ===
==== League table ====
| Pos | Team | Pld | W | D | L | GF | GA | GD | Pts | Qualification or relegation |
|---|---|---|---|---|---|---|---|---|---|---|
| 1 | Paris Saint-Germain (C) | 34 | 26 | 6 | 2 | 92 | 35 | +57 | 84 | Qualification for the Champions League league phase |
| 2 | Marseille | 34 | 20 | 5 | 9 | 74 | 47 | +27 | 65 | Qualification for the Champions League league phase |
| 3 | Monaco | 34 | 18 | 7 | 9 | 63 | 41 | +22 | 61 | Qualification for the Champions League league phase |
| 4 | Nice | 34 | 17 | 9 | 8 | 66 | 41 | +25 | 60 | Qualification for the Champions League third qualifying round |
| 5 | Lille | 34 | 17 | 9 | 8 | 52 | 36 | +16 | 60 | Qualification for the Europa League league phase (Note: Since the 2024–25 Coupe de France winners, Paris Saint-Germain, qualified for the Champions League via league position, the Europa League berth awarded to the cup winners was passed to the sixth-placed team and the Conference League berth was passed to the seventh-placed team.) |

Source: Ligue 1
Rules for classification: 1) Points; 2) Goal difference; 3) Head-to-head points; 4) Head-to-head goal difference; 5) Head-to-head goals scored; 6) Head-to-head away goals scored; 7) Goals scored; 8) Away goals scored; 9) Fair-play points (Note: Head-to-head record is used only after all the matches between the teams in question have been played).
(C) Champions

==== Results summary ====
| Overall | | | | | | | | Home | | | | | | Away | | | | | |
| Pld | W | D | L | GF | GA | GD | Pts | W | D | L | GF | GA | GD | W | D | L | GF | GA | GD |
|---|---|---|---|---|---|---|---|---|---|---|---|---|---|---|---|---|---|---|---|
| 34 | 20 | 5 | 9 | 74 | 47 | +27 | 65 | 10 | 4 | 3 | 41 | 23 | +18 | 10 | 1 | 6 | 33 | 24 | +9 |

Source: Ligue 1

==== Results by round ====
| Round | 1 | 2 | 3 | 4 | 5 | 6 | 7 | 8 | 9 | 10 | 11 | 12 | 13 | 14 | 15 | 16 | 17 | 18 | 19 | 20 | 21 | 22 | 23 | 24 | 25 | 26 | 27 | 28 | 29 | 30 | 31 | 32 | 33 | 34 |
|---|---|---|---|---|---|---|---|---|---|---|---|---|---|---|---|---|---|---|---|---|---|---|---|---|---|---|---|---|---|---|---|---|---|---|
| Ground | A | H | A | H | A | A | H | A | H | A | H | A | H | A | H | H | A | H | A | H | A | H | A | H | H | A | A | H | A | H | H | A | A | H |
| Result | W | D | W | W | W | L | D | W | L | W | L | W | W | W | D | W | W | D | L | W | W | W | L | W | L | L | L | W | L | W | W | D | W | W |
| Position | 1 | 5 | 2 | 2 | 2 | 3 | 3 | 3 | 3 | 2 | 3 | 3 | 2 | 2 | 2 | 2 | 2 | 2 | 2 | 2 | 2 | 2 | 2 | 2 | 2 | 2 | 3 | 2 | 3 | 2 | 2 | 2 | 2 | 2 |

Source: Ligue 1
A = Away; H = Home; W = Win; D = Draw; L = Loss

==== Matches ====
The match schedule was released on 21 June 2024.

| 17 August 2024 1 | Brest | 1–5 | Marseille | Brest |
| 17:00 CEST (UTC+2) | Del Castillo (penalty missed) 9'; Lage (yellow card) 16'; Martin (yellow card) 30'; Lala (yellow card) 45+1'; Camara 45+6'; Amavi (yellow card) 74' | Report | Greenwood 3', 31' (pen.); Cornelius (yellow card) 13'; Luis Henrique 26', 48'; Wahi 69' | Stadium: Stade Francis-Le Blé; Attendance: 14,962; Referee: Benoît Bastien |

| 25 August 2024 2 | Marseille | 2–2 | Reims | Marseille |
| 20:45 CEST (UTC+2) | Harit 25'; Greenwood 71'; Merlin (yellow card) 80' | Report | Akieme 51'; Fofana 55'; Diakité (yellow card) 66' | Stadium: Stade Vélodrome; Attendance: 63,841; Referee: Hakim Ben El Hadj |

| 31 August 2024 3 | Toulouse | 1–3 | Marseille | Toulouse |
| 21:00 CEST (UTC+2) | Magri (red card) 27'; Cásseres (yellow card) 44'; Dønnum (yellow card) 49'; Babicka (yellow card) 73', (goal) 90'; Sierro (yellow card) 82' | Report | Højbjerg (yellow card) 10'; Greenwood 16', 17'; Cresswell 52' (o.g.); Brassier (yellow card) 73' | Stadium: Stadium de Toulouse; Attendance: 19,178; Referee: Stéphanie Frappart |

| 14 September 2024 4 | Marseille | 2–0 | Nice | Marseille |
| 17:00 CEST (UTC+2) | Brassier (yellow card) 18'; Maupay 40'; Luis Henrique 53'; Cornelius (yellow card) 63' (yellow-red card) 74'; Rongier (yellow card) 64'; Rowe (yellow card) 90+1' | Report | Dante (yellow card) 13'; Rosario (yellow card) 31'; Abdi (yellow card) 78' | Stadium: Stade Vélodrome; Attendance: 65,803; Referee: Benoît Millot |

| 22 September 2024 5 | Lyon | 2–3 | Marseille | Décines-Charpieu |
| 20:45 CEST (UTC+2) | Mata (yellow card) 45+1'; Lacazette (penalty missed) 45+7', (yellow card) 59'; Ćaleta-Car 53', (yellow card) 90+3'; Cherki 90+3', (yellow card) 90+4' | Report | Balerdi (yellow card) 1' (yellow-red card) 5'; Lirola 69'; Garcia 82'; Maupay (yellow card) 90+3'; Rowe 90+5' | Stadium: Parc Olympique Lyonnais; Attendance: 53,228; Referee: Benoît Bastien |

| 29 September 2024 6 | Strasbourg | 1–0 | Marseille | Strasbourg |
| 20:45 CEST (UTC+2) | Moreira 40'; Doukouré (yellow card) 56'; Doué (yellow card) 68' | Report | Rabiot (yellow card) 75' | Stadium: Stade de la Meinau; Attendance: 19,790; Referee: Willy Delajod |

| 4 October 2024 7 | Marseille | 1–1 | Angers | Marseille |
| 20:45 CEST (UTC+2) | Maupay (yellow card) 27' (yellow-red card) 30'; Balerdi (yellow card) 31'; Carboni (yellow card) 45+5'; Rowe 51' | Report | Raolisoa (red card) 26'; El Melali 54' | Stadium: Stade Vélodrome; Attendance: 54,568; Referee: Romain Lissorgue |

| 20 October 2024 8 | Montpellier | 0–5 | Marseille | Montpellier |
| 20:45 CEST (UTC+2) | Nzingoula (yellow card) 27'; Džodić (red card) 64' | Report | Wahi 1'; Cornelius (yellow card) 19'; Harit 36'; Højbjerg 40'; Rowe (yellow card) 51'; Greenwood 58'; Henrique 73'; Sternal (yellow card) 90' | Stadium: Stade de la Mosson; Attendance: 18,461; Referee: Clément Turpin |

| 27 October 2024 9 | Marseille | 0–3 | Paris Saint-Germain | Marseille |
| 20:45 CET (UTC+1) | Højbjerg (yellow card) 18'; Harit (red card) 20' | Report | Neves 7'; Balerdi 29' (o.g.); Barcola 40' | Stadium: Stade Vélodrome; Attendance: 66,115; Referee: François Letexier |

| 3 November 2024 10 | Nantes | 1–2 | Marseille | Nantes |
| 20:45 CET (UTC+1) | Kadewere 39' | Report | Maupay 24'; Greenwood 61'; Balerdi (yellow card) 90+3' | Stadium: Stade de la Beaujoire; Attendance: 33,248; Referee: Bastien Dechepy |

| 8 November 2024 11 | Marseille | 1–3 | Auxerre | Marseille |
| 20:45 CET (UTC+1) | Rabiot (yellow card) 60'; Greenwood 65' (pen.), (yellow card) 66'; Wahi (yellow card) 87' | Report | Sinayoko 10'; Perrin 43'; Traorè 45'; Léon (yellow card) 66'; Blair (yellow card) 88' | Stadium: Stade Vélodrome; Attendance: 64,184; Referee: Marc Bollengier |

| 23 November 2024 12 | Lens | 1–3 | Marseille | Lens |
| 17:00 CET (UTC+1) | Frankowski (yellow card) 37'; Machado (yellow card) 74'; Fulgini 80'; Danso (yellow card) 83' | Report | Rongier (yellow card) 19', (goal) 49'; Luis Henrique 57'; Kondogbia (yellow card) 65'; Højbjerg 89'; Garcia (yellow card) 90+1' | Stadium: Stade Bollaert-Delelis; Attendance: 38,223; Referee: Eric Wattellier |

| 1 December 2024 13 | Marseille | 2–1 | Monaco | Marseille |
| 20:45 CET (UTC+1) | Luis Henrique 53'; Greenwood 89' (pen.) | Report | Golovin 41'; Vanderson (yellow card) 90+3' | Stadium: Stade Vélodrome; Attendance: 64,277; Referee: Clément Turpin |

| 8 December 2024 14 | Saint-Étienne | 0–2 | Marseille | Saint-Étienne |
| 20:45 CET (UTC+1) | Sissoko (yellow card) 90+9' | Report | Rabiot 17'; Rongier (yellow card) 47'; Greenwood (penalty missed) 65', 65' | Stadium: Stade Geoffroy-Guichard; Attendance: 35,350; Referee: Jérôme Brisard |

| 14 December 2024 15 | Marseille | 1–1 | Lille | Marseille |
| 17:00 CET (UTC+1) | Merlin 17'; Højbjerg (yellow card) 86'; Lirola (red card) 90+5' | Report | Diakité (yellow card) 63', (goal) 87'; And. Gomes (yellow card) 90+2'; André (yellow card) 90+2' | Stadium: Stade Vélodrome; Attendance: 64,380; Referee: Willy Delajod |

| 5 January 2025 16 | Marseille | 5–1 | Le Havre | Marseille |
| 20:45 CET (UTC+1) | Rongier 25'; Nadir 39', (yellow card) 45+5'; Maupay 43'; Wahi 66'; Garcia 75' | Report | Ayew 85' | Stadium: Stade Vélodrome; Attendance: 64,092; Referee: Thomas Léonard |

| 11 January 2025 17 | Rennes | 1–2 | Marseille | Rennes |
| 21:00 CET (UTC+1) | Kalimuendo (penalty missed) 32', 43'; Hateboer (yellow card) 63'; Assignon (yellow card) 90+6' | Report | Greenwood 45'; Rabiot 49'; Cornelius (yellow card) 90+2'; Balerdi (yellow card) 90+2' | Stadium: Roazhon Park; Attendance: 26,837; Referee: Abdelatif Kherradji |

| 19 January 2025 18 | Marseille | 1–1 | Strasbourg | Marseille |
| 20:45 CET (UTC+1) | Greenwood 68' (pen.); Lirola (yellow card) 71'; Vaz (yellow card) 90+3'; Brassier (yellow card) 90+5' | Report | Emegha 23', (yellow card) 26'; Doué (yellow card) 28'; Lemaréchal (yellow card) 42' | Stadium: Stade Vélodrome; Attendance: 63,992; Referee: Bastien Dechepy |

| 26 January 2025 19 | Nice | 2–0 | Marseille | Nice |
| 20:45 CET (UTC+1) | Guessand 7'; Cho 51'; Ndayishimiye (yellow card) 73' | Report | Bakola (yellow card) 89' | Stadium: Allianz Riviera; Attendance: 31,017; Referee: Eric Wattellier |

| 2 February 2025 20 | Marseille | 3–2 | Lyon | Marseille |
| 20:45 CET (UTC+1) | Murillo (yellow card) 42'; Greenwood 61'; Rabiot 64'; Balerdi (yellow card) 68'; Luis Henrique 85'; Højbjerg (yellow card) 90+2'; Cornelius (yellow card) 90+4' | Report | Tolisso 53'; Lacazette 72' (pen.); Tagliafico (yellow card) 82' | Stadium: Stade Vélodrome; Attendance: 66,096; Referee: Jérôme Brisard |

| 9 February 2025 21 | Angers | 0–2 | Marseille | Angers |
| 20:45 CET (UTC+1) | Aholou (yellow card) 48' | Report | Balerdi (yellow card) 16'; Rabiot (yellow card) 48', (goal) 69'; Maupay 74' | Stadium: Stade Raymond Kopa; Attendance: 17,325; Referee: Hakim Ben El Hadj |

| 15 February 2025 22 | Marseille | 5–1 | Saint-Étienne | Marseille |
| 17:00 CET (UTC+1) | Gouiri 27', 60'; Greenwood 50' (pen.); Murillo 58'; Cornelius (yellow card) 68'; Rabiot 77' | Report | Stassin (yellow card) 15', (goal) 79' | Stadium: Stade Vélodrome; Attendance: 66,199; Referee: Abdelatif Kherradji |

| 22 February 2025 23 | Auxerre | 3–0 | Marseille | Auxerre |
| 21:05 CET (UTC+1) | Perrin 34'; Hoever (yellow card) 59'; Jubal 77' (pen.), 90+1' | Report | Cornelius (yellow card) 38' (yellow-red card) 63'; Rulli (yellow card) 75' | Stadium: Stade de l'Abbé-Deschamps; Attendance: 17,183; Referee: Jérémy Stinat |

| 2 March 2025 24 | Marseille | 2–0 | Nantes | Marseille |
| 20:45 CET (UTC+1) | Højbjerg (yellow card) 37'; Gouiri 73'; Greenwood 77' | Report | Amian (yellow card) 51'; Leroux (yellow card) 75' | Stadium: Stade Vélodrome; Attendance: 61,874; Referee: Stéphanie Frappart |

| 8 March 2025 25 | Marseille | 0–1 | Lens | Marseille |
| 21:05 CET (UTC+1) | Rongier (yellow card) 53'; Bennacer (yellow card) 77'; Balerdi (yellow card) 84' | Report | Bah (yellow card) 60'; El Aynaoui 90+4' | Stadium: Stade Vélodrome; Attendance: 64,942; Referee: Thomas Léonard |

| 16 March 2025 26 | Paris Saint-Germain | 3–1 | Marseille | Paris |
| 20:45 CET (UTC+1) | Dembélé 17'; Mendes (yellow card) 26', (goal) 42'; Lirola 76' (o.g.) | Report | Gouiri 51' | Stadium: Parc des Princes; Attendance: 47,926; Referee: Clément Turpin |

| 29 March 2025 27 | Reims | 3–1 | Marseille | Reims |
| 17:00 CET (UTC+1) | Nakamura 29'; Diakhon 51'; Atangana 68' | Report | Rongier 78' | Stadium: Stade Auguste-Delaune; Attendance: 20,213; Referee: Willy Delajod |

| 6 April 2025 28 | Marseille | 3–2 | Toulouse | Marseille |
| 20:45 CEST (UTC+2) | Suazo 21' (o.g.); Greenwood (yellow card) 24', (goal) 57'; Rabiot 64'; Nadir (yellow card) 90+5' | Report | Magri 28', (yellow card) 56'; Babicka (yellow card) 32'; Cásseres (yellow card) 68'; Sierro 76' | Stadium: Stade Vélodrome; Attendance: 64,320; Referee: Jérémie Pignard |

| 12 April 2025 29 | Monaco | 3–0 | Marseille | Monaco |
| 17:00 CEST (UTC+2) | Singo (yellow card) 9'; Minamino 34'; Embolo 58'; Kehrer (yellow card) 78'; Zakaria 82' (pen.) | Report | Harit (yellow card) 87' | Stadium: Stade Louis II; Attendance: 13,232; Referee: Benoît Bastien |

| 19 April 2025 30 | Marseille | 5–1 | Montpellier | Marseille |
| 21:05 CEST (UTC+2) | Greenwood 8' (pen.), 67'; Rongier (yellow card) 15'; Bille 60' (o.g.); Rowe 74'; Rabiot (yellow card) 77', (goal) 90' | Report | Nzingoula (yellow card) 46'; Mincarelli 83'; Mouanga (yellow card) 90+3' | Stadium: Stade Vélodrome; Attendance: 66,312; Referee: Jérôme Brisard |

| 27 April 2025 31 | Marseille | 4–1 | Brest | Marseille |
| 20:45 CEST (UTC+2) | Gouiri 8', 45', 63'; Chardonnet 37' (o.g.); Murillo (yellow card) 41' | Report | Sima 25'; Ajorque (yellow card) 36'; Chardonnet (yellow card) 71'; Le Cardinal (yellow card) 88'; Lees-Melou (yellow card) 90+2' | Stadium: Stade Vélodrome; Attendance: 62,130; Referee: Stéphanie Frappart |

| 4 May 2025 32 | Lille | 1–1 | Marseille | Villeneuve-d'Ascq |
| 20:45 CEST (UTC+2) | Ismaily (yellow card) 65'; Fernandez-Pardo 74'; Alexsandro (yellow card) 79' | Report | Bennacer (yellow card) 29'; Gouiri 57'; Garcia (yellow card) 73' | Stadium: Stade Pierre-Mauroy; Attendance: 48,284; Referee: Eric Wattellier |

| 10 May 2025 33 | Le Havre | 1–3 | Marseille | Le Havre |
| 21:00 CEST (UTC+2) | Négo (yellow card) 48'; Soumaré 66'; Kinkoue (yellow card) 90+8' | Report | Balerdi (yellow card) 52'; Gouiri 56', 90+9'; Greenwood 85', (yellow card) 86' | Stadium: Stade Océane; Attendance: 23,831; Referee: Willy Delajod |

| 17 May 2025 34 | Marseille | 4–2 | Rennes | Marseille |
| 21:00 CEST (UTC+2) | Greenwood 21' (pen.), 45+1', (penalty missed) 27'; Rabiot 38', 90+2'; Luiz Felipe (yellow card) 40'; Murillo (yellow card) 64'; Dedić (yellow card) 89' | Report | Koné 14', (yellow card) 29'; Rouault (yellow card) 30'; Assignon (yellow card) 50'; Gómez 77' | Stadium: Stade Vélodrome; Attendance: 57,274; Referee: Jérémie Pignard |

=== Coupe de France ===
| 22 December 2024 Round of 64 | Saint-Étienne | 0–4 | Marseille | Saint-Étienne |
| 14:45 CET (UTC+1) | Sissoko (red card) 21'; Cafaro (yellow card) 24'; Mouton (yellow card) 42'; Ekwah (yellow card) 59'; Abdelhamid (yellow card) 74'; Miladinović (yellow card) 90' | Report | Greenwood 22'; Rabiot 34'; Luis Henrique 69'; Rowe (yellow card) 74'; Højbjerg 81' | Stadium: Stade Geoffroy-Guichard; Attendance: 34,547; Referee: Jérémy Stinat |

| 14 January 2025 Round of 32 | Marseille | 1–1 (3–4 p) | Lille | Marseille |
| 21:10 CET (UTC+1) | Maupay (yellow card) 62'; Luis Henrique 90+6' | Report | Bakker (yellow card) 54'; Haraldsson 68'; Diakité (yellow card) 90' | Stadium: Stade Vélodrome; Attendance: 61,954; Referee: Clément Turpin |
| | Penalties |
| | Greenwood (penalty scored); Luis Henrique (penalty missed); Balerdi (penalty scored); Rabiot (penalty scored); Rowe (penalty missed) | | (penalty scored) Bakker; (penalty scored) Ismaily; (penalty scored) And. Gomes; (penalty scored) Alexsandro |

== Statistics ==
=== Appearances and goals ===
| No. | Pos | Nat | Player | Total | | Ligue 1 | | Coupe de France | |
| No. | Pos | Nat | Player | Apps | Goals | Apps | Goals | Apps | Goals |
Goalkeepers
| 1 | GK | (Argentina) ARG | Gerónimo Rulli | 34 | 0 | 34 | 0 | 0 | 0 |
| 12 | GK | (Netherlands) NED | Jeffrey de Lange | 2 | 0 | 0 | 0 | 2 | 0 |
| 36 | GK | (Spain) ESP | Rubén Blanco | 0 | 0 | 0 | 0 | 0 | 0 |
Defenders
| 3 | DF | (France) FRA | Quentin Merlin | 29 | 1 | 21+6 | 1 | 2 | 0 |
| 4 | DF | (Italy) ITA | Luiz Felipe | 4 | 0 | 2+2 | 0 | 0 | 0 |
| 5 | DF | (Argentina) ARG | Leonardo Balerdi | 29 | 0 | 27 | 0 | 2 | 0 |
| 6 | DF | (Switzerland) SUI | Ulisses Garcia | 22 | 2 | 10+10 | 2 | 0+2 | 0 |
| 13 | DF | (Canada) CAN | Derek Cornelius | 23 | 0 | 17+4 | 0 | 1+1 | 0 |
| 29 | DF | (Spain) ESP | Pol Lirola | 19 | 1 | 5+14 | 1 | 0 | 0 |
| 62 | DF | (Panama) PAN | Michael Amir Murillo | 32 | 1 | 27+3 | 1 | 2 | 0 |
| 77 | DF | (Bosnia and Herzegovina) BIH | Amar Dedić | 10 | 0 | 2+8 | 0 | 0 | 0 |
| 99 | DF | (Democratic Republic of the Congo) COD | Chancel Mbemba | 0 | 0 | 0 | 0 | 0 | 0 |
Midfielders
| 11 | MF | (Morocco) MAR | Amine Harit | 13 | 2 | 8+5 | 2 | 0 | 0 |
| 19 | MF | (Central African Republic) CAF | Geoffrey Kondogbia | 26 | 0 | 22+3 | 0 | 1 | 0 |
| 21 | MF | (France) FRA | Valentin Rongier | 27 | 3 | 17+8 | 3 | 2 | 0 |
| 22 | MF | (Algeria) ALG | Ismaël Bennacer | 12 | 0 | 8+4 | 0 | 0 | 0 |
| 23 | MF | (Denmark) DEN | Pierre-Emile Højbjerg | 32 | 3 | 30 | 2 | 2 | 1 |
| 25 | MF | (France) FRA | Adrien Rabiot | 31 | 10 | 27+2 | 9 | 2 | 1 |
| 26 | MF | (Morocco) MAR | Bilal Nadir | 16 | 1 | 5+10 | 1 | 0+1 | 0 |
| 50 | MF | (France) FRA | Darryl Bakola | 2 | 0 | 0+2 | 0 | 0 | 0 |
Forwards
| 8 | FW | (France) FRA | Neal Maupay | 24 | 4 | 13+9 | 4 | 2 | 0 |
| 9 | FW | (Algeria) ALG | Amine Gouiri | 14 | 10 | 12+2 | 10 | 0 | 0 |
| 10 | FW | (England) ENG | Mason Greenwood | 36 | 22 | 32+2 | 21 | 2 | 1 |
| 14 | FW | (Cameroon) CMR | Faris Moumbagna | 1 | 0 | 0+1 | 0 | 0 | 0 |
| 17 | FW | (England) ENG | Jonathan Rowe | 30 | 3 | 6+22 | 3 | 0+2 | 0 |
| 34 | FW | (France) FRA | Robinio Vaz | 3 | 0 | 0+2 | 0 | 0+1 | 0 |
| 44 | FW | (Brazil) BRA | Luis Henrique | 35 | 9 | 29+4 | 7 | 2 | 2 |
| 48 | FW | (France) FRA | Keyliane Abdallah | 1 | 0 | 0+1 | 0 | 0 | 0 |
Players transferred/loaned out during the season
| 7 | MF | (Argentina) ARG | Valentín Carboni | 4 | 0 | 1+3 | 0 | 0 | 0 |
| 9 | FW | (France) FRA | Elye Wahi | 14 | 3 | 7+6 | 3 | 0+1 | 0 |
| 18 | DF | (Ivory Coast) CIV | Bamo Meïté | 3 | 0 | 0+3 | 0 | 0 | 0 |
| 20 | DF | (France) FRA | Lilian Brassier | 12 | 0 | 9+3 | 0 | 0 | 0 |
| 22 | FW | (France) FRA | Enzo Sternal | 2 | 0 | 0+2 | 0 | 0 | 0 |
| 51 | MF | (Canada) CAN | Ismaël Koné | 9 | 0 | 3+5 | 0 | 0+1 | 0 |

Source: Competitions
