= Luis Henrique (footballer, born 2001) =

Brazilian footballer (born 2001)

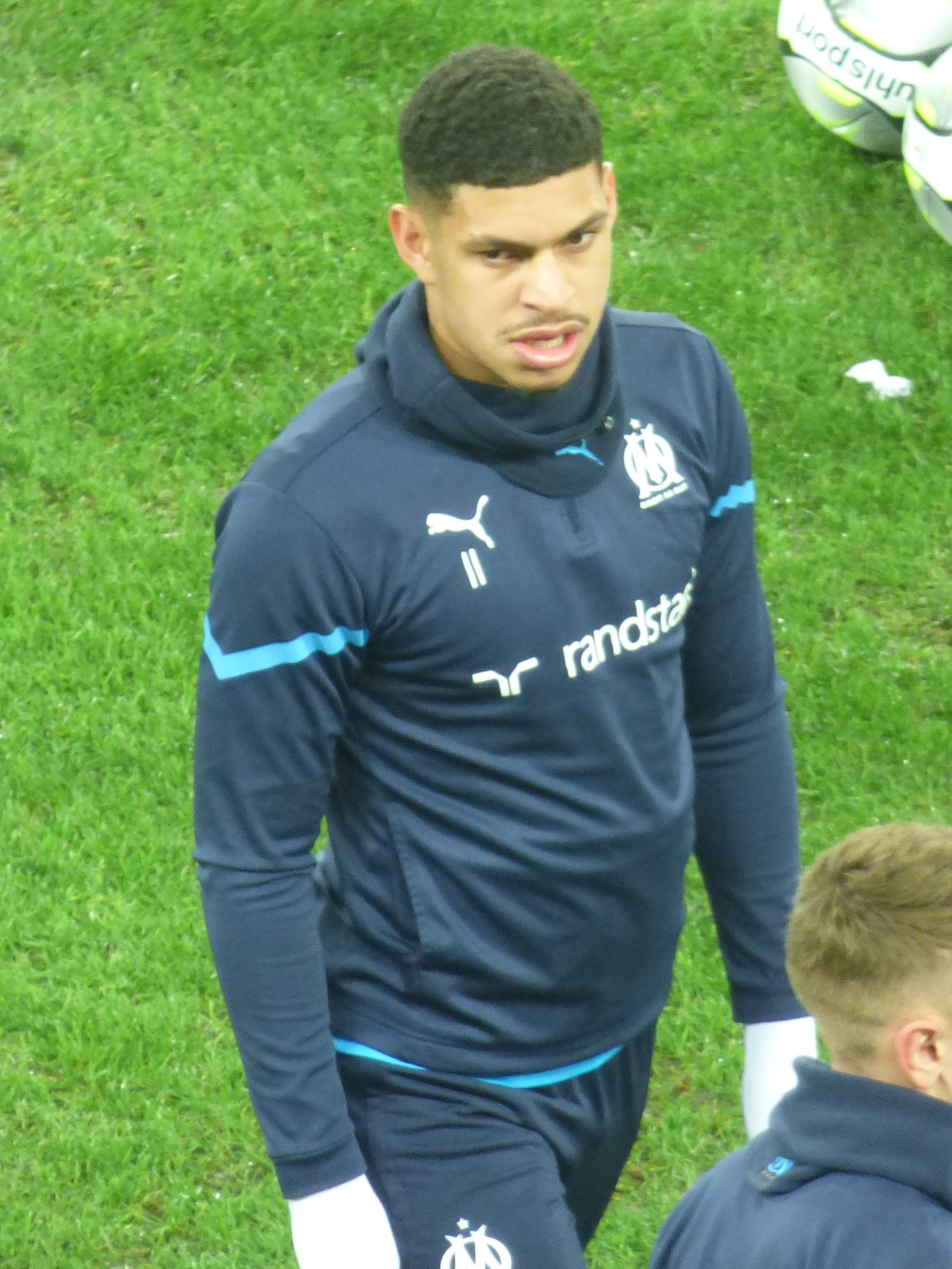
- Henrique with Marseille in 2022

Personal information
- Full name: Luis Henrique Tomaz de Lima
- Date of birth: 14 December 2001 (age 24)
- Place of birth: João Pessoa, Brazil
- Height: 1.81 m (5 ft 11 in)
- Positions: Winger; wing-back

Team information
- Current team: Inter Milan
- Number: 11

Youth career
- 2011–2019: Três Passos
- 2017–2019: → Botafogo (loan)

Senior career*
| Years | Team | Apps | (Gls) |
| 2019–2020 | Botafogo | 17 | (2) |
| 2020–2025 | Marseille | 87 | (8) |
| 2022–2023 | → Botafogo (loan) | 54 | (4) |
| 2025– | Inter Milan | 35 | (1) |
- * Club domestic league appearances and goals as of 17 October 2026

Luis Henrique Tomaz de Lima (born 14 December 2001), commonly known as Luis Henrique is a Brazilian professional footballer who plays as a winger or wing-back for Serie A club Inter Milan.

== Early life ==
Henrique was born in the city of João Pessoa to a Brazilian father and a Brazilian-French mother and grew up in the city of Solânea, in the interior of the state of Paraíba. Henrique holds Brazilian and French nationalities from his parents.

== Career ==
=== Botafogo ===
Henrique started his career at Três Passos, before moving to Botafogo due to a partnership between the two clubs. His promising debut attracted interest notably from Bayern Munich and Juventus.

=== Marseille ===
Henrique joined Ligue 1 club Olympique Marseille in a deal reportedly worth around €8 million on 25 September 2020, where he chose the number 11 shirt.

==== Return to Botafogo (loan) ====
On 22 July 2022, Henrique was loaned back with a buy option to Botafogo in a 18 months deal.

=== Inter Milan ===
On 7 June 2025, Luis Henrique joined Serie A club Inter Milan, signing a five-year contract.

== Career statistics ==
As of match played 19 September 2026

Appearances and goals by club, season and competition
| Club | Season | League | | | National cup (Note: Includes Copa do Brasil, Coupe de France, Coppa Italia) | | Continental | | Other | | Total | |
| Club | Season | Division | Apps | Goals | Apps | Goals | Apps | Goals | Apps | Goals | Apps | Goals |
|---|---|---|---|---|---|---|---|---|---|---|---|---|
| Botafogo | 2019 | Série A | 2 | 0 | 0 | 0 | — | | 0 | 0 | 2 | 0 |
| Botafogo | 2020 | Série A | 5 | 0 | 4 | 0 | — | | 10 (Note: Appearances in Campeonato Carioca) | 2 | 19 | 2 |
| Botafogo | Total | | 7 | 0 | 4 | 0 | — | | 10 | 2 | 21 | 2 |
| Marseille | 2020–21 | Ligue 1 | 19 | 0 | 2 | 0 | 3 (Note: Appearances in UEFA Champions League) | 0 | 0 | 0 | 24 | 0 |
| Marseille | 2021–22 | Ligue 1 | 20 | 0 | 3 | 1 | 2 (Note: Appearances in UEFA Europa League) | 0 | — | | 25 | 1 |
| Marseille | 2023–24 | Ligue 1 | 15 | 1 | 2 | 0 | 7 | 0 | — | | 24 | 1 |
| Marseille | 2024–25 | Ligue 1 | 33 | 7 | 2 | 2 | — | | — | | 35 | 9 |
| Marseille | Total | | 87 | 8 | 9 | 3 | 12 | 0 | 0 | 0 | 108 | 11 |
| Botafogo (loan) | 2022 | Série A | 10 | 0 | — | | — | | — | | 10 | 0 |
| Botafogo (loan) | 2023 | Série A | 34 | 4 | 6 | 1 | 9 (Note: Appearances in Copa Sudamericana) | 1 | 10 | 0 | 59 | 6 |
| Botafogo (loan) | Total | | 44 | 4 | 6 | 1 | 9 | 1 | 10 | 0 | 69 | 6 |
| Inter Milan | 2024–25 | Serie A | — | | — | | — | | 3 (Note: Appearances in FIFA Club World Cup) | 0 | 3 | 0 |
| Inter Milan | 2025–26 | Serie A | 30 | 1 | 5 | 0 | 7 | 0 | 1 (Note: Appearance in Supercoppa Italiana) | 0 | 43 | 1 |
| Inter Milan | 2026–27 | Serie A | 3 | 0 | 0 | 0 | 0 | 0 | 0 | 0 | 3 | 0 |
| Inter Milan | Total | | 33 | 1 | 5 | 0 | 7 | 0 | 4 | 0 | 49 | 1 |
| Career total | | | 171 | 13 | 24 | 4 | 28 | 1 | 24 | 2 | 247 | 20 |

== Honours ==
Inter Milan

- Serie A: 2025–26
- Coppa Italia: 2025–26
