= 2020–21 Olympique de Marseille season =

Olympique de Marseille
2020–21 season
- President: Jacques-Henri Eyraud (until 26 February); Pablo Longoria (from 26 February)
- Head coach: André Villas-Boas (until 2 February); Nasser Larguet (caretaker, from 2 February to 7 March); Jorge Sampaoli (from 7 March)
- Stadium: Stade Vélodrome
- Ligue 1: 5th
- Coupe de France: Round of 32
- Trophée des Champions: Runners-up
- UEFA Champions League: Group stage
- Top goalscorer: League: Arkadiusz Milik (9); All: Arkadiusz Milik; Dimitri Payet (10 each)
- Biggest win: Marseille 3–1 Bordeaux; Marseille 3–1 Nantes; Nîmes 0–2 Marseille; Marseille 3–1 Montpellier; Auxerre 0–2 Marseille; Marseille 3–1 Brest; Marseille 2–0 Dijon; Reims 1–3 Marseille
- Biggest defeat: Nice 3–0 Marseille; Marseille 0–3 Manchester City; Porto 3–0 Marseille; Manchester City 3–0 Marseille
Home colours	Away colours	Third colours

The 2020–21 season was the 115th season in the existence of Olympique de Marseille and the club's 25th consecutive season in the top flight of French football. In addition to the domestic league, Marseille participated in this season's editions of the Coupe de France, the Trophée des Champions, and the UEFA Champions League. The season covered the period from 1 July 2020 to 30 June 2021.

== Players ==
=== First-team squad ===
Note: Flags indicate national team as defined under FIFA eligibility rules; some limited exceptions apply. Players may hold more than one non-FIFA nationality.

No.	Pos.	Nation	Player
1	GK	CMR	Simon Ngapandouetnbu
2	DF	JPN	Hiroki Sakai
3	DF	ESP	Álvaro
4	MF	FRA	Boubacar Kamara
5	DF	ARG	Leonardo Balerdi (on loan from Borussia Dortmund)
8	MF	FRA	Olivier Ntcham (on loan from Celtic)
9	FW	ARG	Darío Benedetto
10	FW	FRA	Dimitri Payet (third-captain)
11	FW	BRA	Luis Henrique
15	DF	CRO	Duje Ćaleta-Car
16	GK	FRA	Yohann Pelé
17	MF	FRA	Michaël Cuisance (on loan from Bayern Munich)
18	DF	FRA	Jordan Amavi
19	FW	POL	Arkadiusz Milik (on loan from Napoli)
20	DF	FRA	Christopher Rocchia
21	MF	FRA	Valentin Rongier

No.	Pos.	Nation	Player
22	MF	FRA	Pape Gueye
24	MF	TUN	Saîf-Eddine Khaoui
25	DF	JPN	Yuto Nagatomo
26	FW	FRA	Florian Thauvin (vice-captain)
28	FW	FRA	Valère Germain
29	DF	ESP	Pol Lirola (on loan from Fiorentina)
30	GK	FRA	Steve Mandanda (captain)
31	MF	ITA	Franco Tongya
32	DF	FRA	Lucas Perrin
34	MF	FRA	Alexandre Phliponeau
37	DF	FRA	Aaron Kamardin
38	MF	FRA	Ugo Bertelli
39	FW	FRA	Jores Rahou
41	MF	FRA	Cheick Souaré
42	DF	FRA	Richecard Richard
43	MF	FRA	Nassim Ahmed

=== Out on loan ===
Note: Flags indicate national team as defined under FIFA eligibility rules; some limited exceptions apply. Players may hold more than one non-FIFA nationality.

No.	Pos.	Nation	Player
—	GK	FRA	Ahmadou Dia (on loan to Dordrecht)
—	DF	COM	Abdallah Ali Mohamed (on loan to Zulte Waregem)
—	MF	SRB	Nemanja Radonjić (on loan to Hertha BSC)

No.	Pos.	Nation	Player
—	MF	FRA	Maxime Lopez (on loan to Sassuolo)
—	MF	NED	Kevin Strootman (on loan to Genoa)

== Transfers ==
=== In ===
No.	Pos	Player	Transferred from	Fee	Date	Source
3	DF	(Spain) Álvaro	(Spain) Villarreal	€5,000,000	1 July 2020	
22	MF	(France) Pape Gueye	(England) Watford	€3,000,000	1 July 2020	
–	FW	(Greece) Kostas Mitroglou	(Netherlands) PSV Eindhoven	Loan return	1 July 2020	
5	DF	(Argentina) Leonardo Balerdi	(Germany) Borussia Dortmund	Loan	21 July 2020	
25	MF	(Japan) Yuto Nagatomo	(Turkey) Galatasaray	Free transfer	31 August 2020	
11	FW	(Brazil) Luis Henrique	(Brazil) Botafogo	€12,000,000	25 September 2020	
17	MF	(France) Michaël Cuisance	(Germany) Bayern Munich	Loan	5 October 2020	
19	FW	(Poland) Arkadiusz Milik	(Italy) Napoli	Loan	21 January 2021	
8	MF	(France) Olivier Ntcham	(Scotland) Celtic	Loan	1 February 2021	

=== Out ===
No.	Pos	Player	Transferred to	Fee	Date	Source
22	MF	(France) Grégory Sertic	End of contract (retired)	N/A	1 July 2020	
19	FW	(France) Isaac Lihadji	(France) Lille	Free transfer	1 July 2020	
31	DF	(Comoros) Abdallah Ali Mohamed	(Belgium) Zulte Waregem	Loan	28 September 2020	
17	DF	(France) Bouna Sarr	(Germany) Bayern Munich	€10,000,000	5 October 2020	
27	MF	(France) Maxime Lopez	(Italy) Sassuolo	Loan	5 October 2020	
6	MF	(Netherlands) Kevin Strootman	(Italy) Genoa	Loan	12 January 2021	
8	MF	(France) Morgan Sanson	(England) Aston Villa	€18,000,000	26 January 2021	
38	FW	(Greece) Kostas Mitroglou	(Greece) Aris	Free transfer	26 January 2021	
36	FW	(France) Marley Aké	(Italy) Juventus	€8,000,000	28 January 2021	
7	MF	(Serbia) Nemanja Radonjić	(Germany) Hertha BSC	Loan	1 February 2021	

== Pre-season and friendlies ==
Win Draw Loss

11 July 2020 Friendly	Lusitano	Cancelled	Marseille	Faro, Portugal
--:-- CEST (UTC+1)

19 July 2020 Friendly	FC Pinzgau	1–5	Marseille	Kufstein, Austria
18:30 CEST (UTC+2)	Tandari 60'	Report	Gueye 24'; Álvaro 31'; Payet 47'; Sanson 50'; Germain 72'	Stadium: Kufstein Arena; Referee: Olivia Tschon

22 July 2020 Friendly	SV Heimstetten	1–6	Marseille	Grassau, Germany
18:30 CEST (UTC+2)	Skrijelj 23'; Sabbagh (yellow card) 27'	Report	Payet (yellow card) 8'; Aké 25', 45+1'; Álvaro (yellow card) 27'; Kamara 44'; Chabrolle 64'; Benedetto 65'; Radonjić (yellow card) 86'; Rongier 90'	Stadium: Sportzentrum Brandstätt

25 July 2020 Friendly	Marseille	1–2	DAC Dunajská Streda	Kufstein, Austria
16:00 CEST (UTC+2)	Thauvin 52' (pen.)	Report	Ramírez 17'; Kalmár 33'	Stadium: Kufstein Arena

31 July 2020 Audi Digital Summer Tour	Bayern Munich	1–0	Marseille	Munich, Germany
16:00 CEST (UTC+2)	Gnabry 19'	Report		Stadium: FC Bayern Campus; Attendance: 0 Referee: Felix Brych (Germany)

5 August 2020 Friendly	Marseille	Cancelled	Montpellier	Marseille, France
20:30 CEST (UTC+2)				Stadium: Stade Vélodrome

9 August 2020 Friendly	Nîmes	0–1	Marseille	Nîmes, France
20:00 CEST (UTC+2)		Report	Ćaleta-Car 31'; Kamara (yellow card) 69'	Stadium: Stade des Costières; Referee: Stéphanie Frappart

14 August 2020 Friendly	Marseille	Cancelled	VfB Stuttgart	Fos-sur-mer, France
17:00 CEST (UTC+2)		Report		Stadium: Stade Parsemain

4 September 2020 Friendly	Marseille	2–2	Nîmes	Marseille, France
11:00 CEST (UTC+2)	Lopez 5'; Rongier 8'	Report	Koné 15'; Benrahou 48'	Stadium: Centre d'entraînement Robert Louis-Dreyfus

== Competitions ==
=== Overall record ===
Competition	First match	Last match	Starting round	Final position	Record							
Competition	First match	Last match	Starting round	Final position	Pld	W	D	L	GF	GA	GD	Win %
Ligue 1	30 August 2020	23 May 2021	Matchday 1	5th	38	16	12	10	54	47	+7	42.11
Coupe de France	10 February 2021	7 March 2021	Round of 64	Round of 32	2	1	0	1	3	2	+1	50.00
Trophée des Champions	13 January 2021		Final	Runners-up	1	0	0	1	1	2	−1	0.00
Champions League	21 October 2020	9 December 2020	Group stage	Group stage	6	1	0	5	2	13	−11	16.67
Total					47	18	12	17	60	64	−4	38.30

Source: Soccerway

=== Ligue 1 ===
==== League table ====
Pos	Team	Pld	W	D	L	GF	GA	GD	Pts	Qualification or relegation
3	Monaco	38	24	6	8	76	42	+34	78	Qualification for the Champions League third qualifying round
4	Lyon	38	22	10	6	81	43	+38	76	Qualification for the Europa League group stage (Note: Since the winners of the 2020–21 Coupe de France, Paris Saint-Germain, qualified for European competition based on league position, the Europa League group stage spot reserved for the cup winners was passed to the fifth-placed team, and the Europa Conference League play-off round spot was passed to the sixth-placed team.)
5	Marseille	38	16	12	10	54	47	+7	60	Qualification for the Europa League group stage
6	Rennes	38	16	10	12	52	40	+12	58	Qualification for the Europa Conference League play-off round
7	Lens	38	15	12	11	55	54	+1	57	

Source: Ligue 1
Rules for classification: 1) Points; 2) Goal difference; 3) Goals scored; 4) Head-to-head goal difference; 5) Fairplay ranking.

==== Results summary ====
Overall								Home						Away					
Pld	W	D	L	GF	GA	GD	Pts	W	D	L	GF	GA	GD	W	D	L	GF	GA	GD
38	16	12	10	54	47	+7	60	10	5	4	32	23	+9	6	7	6	22	24	−2

Source: Ligue 1

==== Results by round ====
Round	1	2	3	4	5	6	7	8	9	10	11	12	13	14	15	16	17	18	19	20	21	22	23	24	25	26	27	28	29	30	31	32	33	34	35	36	37	38
Ground	H	A	A	H	H	A	H	A	H	A	H	H	A	H	A	H	A	H	A	H	A	H	A	H	A	A	H	A	H	A	H	A	H	A	H	A	H	A
Result	L	W	W	D	D	D	W	W	L	W	W	W	W	W	L	D	L	W	D	L	L	W	D	L	D	D	D	L	W	L	W	D	W	W	D	L	W	D
Position	14	10	8	7	9	10	6	4	5	4	6	6	4	4	4	4	5	5	6	6	6	9	9	9	6	7	7	6	5	6	6	6	6	6	6	5	5	5

Source: Ligue 1
A = Away; H = Home; W = Win; D = Draw; L = Loss

==== Matches ====
The league fixtures were announced on 9 July 2020.

30 August 2020 2	Brest	2–3	Marseille	Brest
21:00 CEST (UTC+2)	Faivre 45+1'; Pierre-Gabriel (yellow card) 84'; Charbonnier 89'; Magnetti (yellow card) 90'	Report	Kamara (yellow card) 8'; Thauvin 20'; Ćaleta-Car 27', 80'; Amavi (yellow card) 30'; Radonjić (yellow card) 45+3'; Balerdi (yellow card) 61'	Stadium: Stade Francis-Le Blé; Attendance: 5,000; Referee: Amaury Delerue

13 September 2020 3	Paris Saint-Germain	0–1	Marseille	Paris
21:00 CEST (UTC+2)	Neymar (yellow card) 11' (red card) 90+7'; Florenzi (yellow card) 13'; Bernat (yellow card) 52'; Paredes (yellow card) 72' (yellow-red card) 90+8'; Di María (yellow card) 74'; Kurzawa (red card) 90+7'	Report	Sakai (yellow card) 7'; Payet (yellow card) 11'; Thauvin 31'; Gueye (yellow card) 38'; Álvaro (yellow card) 50'; Lopez (yellow card) 61'; Benedetto (yellow card) 71' (yellow-red card) 90+8'; Strootman (yellow card) 90+1'; Amavi (red card) 90+7'	Stadium: Parc des Princes; Attendance: 5,000; Referee: Jérôme Brisard

17 September 2020 1	Marseille	0–2	Saint-Étienne	Marseille
21:00 CEST (UTC+2)	Sakai (yellow card) 30'; Sanson (yellow card) 45+1'	Report	Hamouma 6'; Maçon (yellow card) 21'; Bouanga 75'; Gourna-Douath (yellow card) 85'	Stadium: Stade Vélodrome; Attendance: 990; Referee: Ruddy Buquet
Note: The match was originally scheduled for 21 August 2020, but was postponed after four Marseille players tested positive for COVID-19.

20 September 2020 4	Marseille	1–1	Lille	Marseille
21:00 CEST (UTC+2)	Nagatomo (yellow card) 21'; Thauvin (yellow card) 58'; Álvaro (yellow card) 65'; Germain 85'	Report	Luiz Araújo 47'; André (yellow card) 50'; Bradarić (yellow card) 58'; Sanches (yellow card) 80'	Stadium: Stade Vélodrome; Attendance: 983; Referee: Hakim Ben El Hadj

26 September 2020 5	Marseille	1–1	Metz	Marseille
21:00 CEST (UTC+2)	Sanson 90+5'	Report	Maïga (yellow card) 24'; Angban (yellow card) 56'; Niane 71'	Stadium: Stade Vélodrome; Referee: Eric Wattellier

4 October 2020 6	Lyon	1–1	Marseille	Décines-Charpieu
21:00 CEST (UTC+2)	Aouar 28' (pen.); Bruno Guimarães (yellow card) 86'	Report	Ćaleta-Car (yellow card) 4'; Payet 16', (red card) 19'	Stadium: Parc Olympique Lyonnais; Referee: Stéphanie Frappart

17 October 2020 7	Marseille	3–1	Bordeaux	Marseille
21:00 CEST (UTC+2)	Thauvin 5', (penalty missed) 14'; Sakai (yellow card) 7'; Sanson (yellow card) 49'; Amavi 54'; Pablo 64' (o.g.); Ćaleta-Car (yellow card) 72'	Report	Adli (yellow card) 4'; Maja 83'	Stadium: Stade Vélodrome; Referee: Frank Schneider

24 October 2020 8	Lorient	0–1	Marseille	Lorient
17:00 CEST (UTC+2)	Boisgard (yellow card) 19'; Mendes (yellow card) 53'; Gravillon (yellow card) 73'	Report	Benedetto (yellow card) 36'; Balerdi 53'; Álvaro (yellow card) 55'; Rongier (yellow card) 72'	Stadium: Stade du Moustoir; Referee: Benoît Bastien

6 November 2020 10	Strasbourg	0–1	Marseille	Strasbourg
21:00 CET (UTC+1)		Report	Amavi (yellow card) 52'; Kamara (yellow card) 58'; Sanson 72'; Khaoui (yellow card) 87'; Mandanda (yellow card) 89'	Stadium: Stade de la Meinau; Attendance: 0 Referee: Johan Hamel

28 November 2020 12	Marseille	3–1	Nantes	Marseille
17:00 CET (UTC+1)	Thauvin 2'; Payet 35', (yellow card) 47'; Rongier (yellow card) 54'; Benedetto 60' (pen.); Álvaro (yellow card) 72'; Strootman (yellow card) 90+3'	Report	Castelletto (yellow card) 57'; Blas 73', (yellow card) 83'	Stadium: Stade Vélodrome; Attendance: 0 Referee: Mikael Lesage

4 December 2020 13	Nîmes	0–2	Marseille	Nîmes
21:00 CET (UTC+1)	Landre (yellow card) 44'; Cubas (yellow card) 74' (yellow-red card) 77'	Report	Amavi (yellow card) 1'; Cuisance (yellow card) 21'; Ćaleta-Car (yellow card) 40'; Álvaro (yellow card) 44'; Benedetto 57'; Germain 84'	Stadium: Stade des Costières; Attendance: 0 Referee: Willy Delajod

12 December 2020 14	Marseille	2–1	Monaco	Marseille
17:00 CET (UTC+1)	Thauvin 5', (yellow card) 77'; Benedetto 13'; Kamara (yellow card) 76'; Germain (yellow card) 90+4'	Report	Fofana (yellow card) 43'; Ben Yedder 79' (pen.)	Stadium: Stade Vélodrome; Attendance: 0 Referee: Benoît Millot

16 December 2020 15	Rennes	2–1	Marseille	Rennes
21:00 CET (UTC+1)	Traoré 63'; Hunou (yellow card) 72', (goal) 83'	Report	Gueye (yellow card) 11' (yellow-red card) 36', (goal) 24'; Balerdi (yellow card) 42'; Cuisance (yellow card) 80'	Stadium: Roazhon Park; Attendance: 0 Referee: Clément Turpin

19 December 2020 16	Marseille	1–1	Reims	Marseille
19:00 CET (UTC+1)	Nagatomo (yellow card) 25'; Thauvin 45'	Report	De Smet (yellow card) 19'; Nagatomo 21' (o.g.); Touré (yellow card) 78'; Cassamá (yellow card) 90+2'	Stadium: Stade Vélodrome; Attendance: 0 Referee: Thomas Léonard

23 December 2020 17	Angers	2–1	Marseille	Angers
21:00 CET (UTC+1)	Pereira Lage 4'; Diony 23'; Doumbia (yellow card) 46'; Fulgini (yellow card) 48'	Report	Rongier (yellow card) 14', (goal) 75'; Sakai (yellow card) 38'; Ćaleta-Car (yellow card) 55'; Payet (penalty missed) 71'; Khaoui (yellow card) 88'	Stadium: Stade Raymond Kopa; Attendance: 0 Referee: Hakim Ben El Hadj

6 January 2021 18	Marseille	3–1	Montpellier	Marseille
21:00 CET (UTC+1)	Radonjić 41'; Payet 80'; Germain 84'	Report	Mollet 82'	Stadium: Stade Vélodrome; Attendance: 0 Referee: Stéphanie Frappart

9 January 2021 19	Dijon	0–0	Marseille	Dijon
21:00 CET (UTC+1)	Diop (yellow card) 19'; Manga (yellow card) 23'; Lautoa (yellow card) 66'	Report	Gueye (yellow card) 29'; Rongier (yellow card) 63'	Stadium: Stade Gaston Gérard; Attendance: 0 Referee: Jérôme Miguelgorry

16 January 2021 20	Marseille	1–2	Nîmes	Marseille
17:00 CET (UTC+1)	Thauvin (penalty missed) 35'; Rongier (yellow card) 61'; Ćaleta-Car (yellow card) 68'; Benedetto 85'	Report	Cubas (yellow card) 20'; Eliasson 55', 58'; Briançon (yellow card) 90'	Stadium: Stade Vélodrome; Attendance: 0 Referee: Jérémy Stinat

20 January 2021 9	Marseille	0–1	Lens	Marseille
21:00 CET (UTC+1)	Gueye (yellow card) 55'; Balerdi (yellow card) 62'; Perrin (yellow card) 69'; Khaoui (yellow card) 81'; Cuisance (yellow card) 90+1'	Report	Haïdara (yellow card) 19'; Banza (yellow card) 25', (goal) 59'; Medina (yellow card) 55'	Stadium: Stade Vélodrome; Attendance: 0 Referee: Jérémie Pignard
Note: The match was originally scheduled for 30 October 2020, but was postponed after more than ten Lens players tested positive for COVID-19.

23 January 2021 21	Monaco	3–1	Marseille	Monaco
21:00 CET (UTC+1)	Maripán 47'; Tchouaméni 75'; Diatta (yellow card) 81'; Golovin (yellow card) 89'; Jovetić 90+2'; Fofana (yellow card) 90+3'	Report	Radonjić 12'; Balerdi (yellow card) 21'; Sakai (yellow card) 49'; Álvaro (yellow card) 76'; Khaoui (yellow card) 82'; Gueye (yellow card) 90'	Stadium: Stade Louis II; Attendance: 0 Referee: François Letexier

3 February 2021 23	Lens	2–2	Marseille	Lens
21:00 CET (UTC+1)	Fofana (yellow card) 43'; Sotoca 46'; Doucouré (yellow card) 48'; Medina 61', (yellow card) 63'; Jean (yellow card) 90+2'	Report	Thauvin 37'; Milik 45+2'; Lirola (yellow card) 60'; Álvaro (yellow card) 90+1'	Stadium: Stade Bollaert-Delelis; Attendance: 0 Referee: Willy Delajod

7 February 2021 24	Marseille	0–2	Paris Saint-Germain	Marseille
21:00 CET (UTC+1)	Gueye (yellow card) 49'; Payet (red card) 90+1'	Report	Mbappé 9'; Icardi 24', (yellow card) 53'; Paredes (yellow card) 45+1'	Stadium: Stade Vélodrome; Attendance: 0 Referee: Benoît Bastien

14 February 2021 25	Bordeaux	0–0	Marseille	Bordeaux
21:00 CET (UTC+1)	Adli (yellow card) 65'	Report	Rongier (yellow card) 45+1'; Balerdi (red card) 55'; Benedetto (red card) 59'	Stadium: Matmut Atlantique; Attendance: 0 Referee: Jérôme Brisard

17 February 2021 11	Marseille	3–2	Nice	Marseille
21:00 CET (UTC+1)	Álvaro 14'; Khaoui 42', 53'; Kamara (yellow card) 44'; Sakai (yellow card) 90+3'	Report	Gouiri 47'; Lees-Melou (yellow card) 73'; Sellouki 87'	Stadium: Stade Vélodrome; Attendance: 0 Referee: Mikael Lesage
Note: The match was originally scheduled for 21 November 2020, but was postponed after more than ten Nice players tested positive for COVID-19.

20 February 2021 26	Nantes	1–1	Marseille	Nantes
17:00 CET (UTC+1)	Traoré (yellow card) 32'; Castelletto (yellow card) 43'; Blas 50'; Chirivella (yellow card) 74'; Bamba (yellow card) 88'	Report	Payet 69'; Álvaro (yellow card) 88'; Sakai (red card) 90+4'	Stadium: Stade de la Beaujoire; Attendance: 0 Referee: Amaury Delerue

28 February 2021 27	Marseille	1–1	Lyon	Marseille
21:00 CET (UTC+1)	Milik 44' (pen.); Kamara (yellow card) 64'; Payet (yellow card) 78'; Álvaro (yellow card) 81'; Gueye (yellow card) 90+4'	Report	Toko Ekambi 21'; Paquetá (yellow card) 42' (yellow-red card) 71'; Mendes (yellow card) 78'; Depay (yellow card) 81'	Stadium: Stade Vélodrome; Attendance: 0 Referee: Benoît Millot

3 March 2021 28	Lille	2–0	Marseille	Villeneuve-d'Ascq
21:00 CET (UTC+1)	David 90', 90+1'	Report	Gueye (yellow card) 90+1'	Stadium: Stade Pierre-Mauroy; Attendance: 0 Referee: Clément Turpin

10 March 2021 22	Marseille	1–0	Rennes	Marseille
19:00 CET (UTC+1)	Ćaleta-Car (yellow card) 32'; Kamara (yellow card) 79'; Cuisance 88'	Report	Camavinga (yellow card) 33'; Aguerd (yellow card) 41'; Nyamsi (yellow card) 45+1'	Stadium: Stade Vélodrome; Attendance: 0 Referee: Jérémie Pignard
Note: The match was originally scheduled for 30 January 2021, but was postponed after violent supporter protests occurred at the Marseille training center.

13 March 2021 29	Marseille	3–1	Brest	Marseille
17:00 CET (UTC+1)	Ćaleta-Car (yellow card) 21'; Álvaro (yellow card) 23'; Thauvin (yellow card) 38', (goal) 88'; Milik 45+1'; Cuisance 90+3'	Report	Mounié (yellow card) 55'; Brassier 71'	Stadium: Stade Vélodrome; Attendance: 0 Referee: Jérôme Miguelgorry

20 March 2021 30	Nice	3–0	Marseille	Nice
17:00 CET (UTC+1)	Thuram 34'; Gouiri 74'; Benítez (yellow card) 90'; Claude-Maurice 90+1'	Report	Ćaleta-Car (yellow card) 78'	Stadium: Allianz Riviera; Attendance: 0 Referee: François Letexier

4 April 2021 31	Marseille	2–0	Dijon	Marseille
21:00 CEST (UTC+2)	Álvaro (yellow card) 32', (goal) 79'; Balerdi 45+1'; Gueye (yellow card) 73'	Report	Konaté (yellow card) 9'; Benzia (yellow card) 24'; Muzinga (yellow card) 38'; Coulibaly (yellow card) 78'	Stadium: Stade Vélodrome; Attendance: 0 Referee: Ruddy Buquet

10 April 2021 32	Montpellier	3–3	Marseille	Montpellier
21:00 CEST (UTC+2)	Delort 1'; Mollet (yellow card) 8'; Laborde 47', 90+2'; Ferri (yellow card) 76'	Report	Thauvin (yellow card) 40'; Milik 43'; Gueye 45+1'; Álvaro (yellow card) 54'; Ćaleta-Car (red card) 62'; Perrin 71'	Stadium: Stade de la Mosson; Attendance: 0 Referee: Jérôme Brisard

17 April 2021 33	Marseille	3–2	Lorient	Marseille
17:00 CEST (UTC+2)	Balerdi (yellow card) 39'; Payet 53'; Lirola 56', 90+1'	Report	Moffi 19', 70'	Stadium: Stade Vélodrome; Attendance: 0 Referee: Hakim Ben El Hadj

23 April 2021 34	Reims	1–3	Marseille	Reims
21:00 CEST (UTC+2)	Faes (yellow card) 29' (yellow-red card) 69'; Mbuku 38'	Report	Payet 41', 76'; Milik 45+1'	Stadium: Stade Auguste-Delaune; Attendance: 0 Referee: Eric Wattellier

30 April 2021 35	Marseille	1–1	Strasbourg	Marseille
21:00 CEST (UTC+2)	Rongier (yellow card) 55'; Lirola (yellow card) 81'; Benedetto 86'; Milik (yellow card) 90+2'; Gueye (yellow card) 90+3'	Report	Koné (yellow card) 53'; Mitrović 73'; Diallo (yellow card) 85'	Stadium: Stade Vélodrome; Attendance: 0 Referee: Stéphanie Frappart

9 May 2021 36	Saint-Étienne	1–0	Marseille	Saint-Étienne
13:00 CEST (UTC+2)	Nordin 43'; Kolodziejczak (yellow card) 76'	Report	Thauvin (yellow card) 63'; Balerdi (yellow card) 67'; Álvaro (yellow card) 85'	Stadium: Stade Geoffroy-Guichard; Attendance: 0 Referee: Johan Hamel

16 May 2021 37	Marseille	3–2	Angers	Marseille
21:00 CEST (UTC+2)	Milik 9', 48', 90+5' (pen.), (yellow card) 37'; Rongier (yellow card) 22'; Álvaro (yellow card) 88'	Report	Pereira Lage 57', (yellow card) 62'; Thomas 85', (yellow card) 90+3'	Stadium: Stade Vélodrome; Attendance: 0 Referee: Frank Schneider

23 May 2021 38	Metz	1–1	Marseille	Metz
21:00 CEST (UTC+2)	Bronn (yellow card) 36'; Sarr (yellow card) 41'; Ambrose (yellow card) 53'; Boulaya 90+6' (pen.)	Report	Lirola (yellow card) 70'; Payet (yellow card) 90'; Milik 90+13' (pen.)	Stadium: Stade Saint-Symphorien; Attendance: 0 Referee: Hakim Ben El Hadj

=== Coupe de France ===
10 February 2021 Round of 64	Auxerre	0–2	Marseille	Auxerre
14:45 CET (UTC+1)		Report	Benedetto 54'; Dieng 90+2'	Stadium: Stade de l'Abbé-Deschamps; Attendance: 0 Referee: Frank Schneider

7 March 2021 Round of 32	Canet Roussillon FC	2–1	Marseille	Perpignan
21:00 CET (UTC+1)	Posteraro 21'; Bai 71'	Report	Milik 38'; Gueye (yellow card) 40'	Stadium: Stade Gilbert Brutus; Attendance: 0 Referee: Willy Delajod

=== Trophée des Champions ===
13 January 2021 Final	Paris Saint-Germain	2–1	Marseille	Lens
21:00 CET (UTC+1)	Icardi 39'; Neymar 85' (pen.); Mbappé (yellow card) 90+4'	Report	Radonjić (yellow card) 17'; Nagatomo (yellow card) 26'; Lirola (yellow card) 72'; Álvaro (yellow card) 77'; Payet 89'	Stadium: Stade Bollaert-Delelis; Attendance: 0 Referee: Ruddy Buquet

=== UEFA Champions League ===
==== Group stage ====
The group stage draw was held on 1 October 2020.

Pos	Team	Pld	W	D	L	GF	GA	GD	Pts	Qualification	MCI	POR	OLY	MAR
1	(England) Manchester City	6	5	1	0	13	1	+12	16	Advance to knockout phase	—	3–1	3–0	3–0
2	(Portugal) Porto	6	4	1	1	10	3	+7	13	Advance to knockout phase	0–0	—	2–0	3–0
3	(Greece) Olympiacos	6	1	0	5	2	10	−8	3 (Note: Tied on head-to-head points (3). Head-to-head away goals: Olympiacos 1, Marseille 0.)	Transfer to Europa League	0–1	0–2	—	1–0
4	(France) Marseille	6	1	0	5	2	13	−11	3		0–3	0–2	2–1	—

Source: UEFA
Rules for classification: Group stage tiebreakers
Notes:

21 October 2020 1	Olympiacos (Greece)	1–0	(France) Marseille	Pireus, Greece
22:00 EEST (UTC+3)	Hassan 90+1', (yellow card) 90+5'	Report		Stadium: Karaiskakis Stadium; Attendance: 0 (Note: Due to the COVID-19 pandemic in Europe, the match was played behind closed doors.); Referee: Daniele Orsato (Italy)

27 October 2020 2	Marseille (France)	0–3	(England) Manchester City	Marseille, France
21:00 CET (UTC+1)	Amavi (yellow card) 62'; Ćaleta-Car (yellow card) 71'	Report	Torres 18'; Laporte (yellow card) 59'; Gündoğan 76'; Sterling 81'	Stadium: Stade Vélodrome; Attendance: 0 Referee: Tobias Stieler (Germany)

3 November 2020 3	Porto (Portugal)	3–0	(France) Marseille	Porto, Portugal
20:00 WET (UTC±0)	Marega 4'; Oliveira 28' (pen.), (yellow card) 32'; Díaz 69'	Report	Payet (penalty missed) 10'; Thauvin (yellow card) 36'; Kamara (yellow card) 58'; Amavi (yellow card) 64'; Álvaro (yellow card) 79'; Strootman (yellow card) 86'	Stadium: Estádio do Dragão; Attendance: 0 Referee: Antonio Mateu Lahoz (Spain)

25 November 2020 4	Marseille (France)	0–2	(Portugal) Porto	Marseille, France
21:00 CET (UTC+1)	Balerdi (yellow card) 29' (yellow-red card) 70'; Sanson (yellow card) 36'; Kamara (yellow card) 49'; Thauvin (yellow card) 54'; Payet (yellow card) 85'	Report	Sanusi 39'; Grujić (yellow card) 58' (yellow-red card) 67'; Oliveira 72' (pen.), (yellow card) 86'	Stadium: Stade Vélodrome; Attendance: 0 Referee: Andreas Ekberg (Sweden)

1 December 2020 5	Marseille (France)	2–1	(Greece) Olympiacos	Marseille, France
21:00 CET (UTC+1)	Payet 55' (pen.), 75' (pen.); Sakai (yellow card) 89'	Report	Camara 33', (yellow card) 62'; Holebas (yellow card) 59'; Rafinha (yellow card) 73'	Stadium: Stade Vélodrome; Attendance: 0 Referee: Jesús Gil Manzano (Spain)

9 December 2020 6	Manchester City (England)	3–0	(France) Marseille	Manchester, England
20:00 GMT (UTC±0)	Torres 48'; Agüero 77'; Álvaro 90' (o.g.)	Report	Gueye (yellow card) 39'	Stadium: City of Manchester Stadium; Attendance: 0 Referee: Halil Umut Meler (Turkey)

== Statistics ==
=== Appearances and goals ===
No.	Pos	Nat	Player	Total		Ligue 1		Coupe de France		Trophée des Champions		UEFA Champions League	
No.	Pos	Nat	Player	Apps	Goals	Apps	Goals	Apps	Goals	Apps	Goals	Apps	Goals
Goalkeepers
1	GK	(Cameroon) CMR	Simon Ngapandouetnbu	0	0	0	0	0	0	0	0	0	0
16	GK	(France) FRA	Yohann Pelé	3	0	1	0	1	0	0+1	0	0	0
30	GK	(France) FRA	Steve Mandanda	44	0	37	0	0	0	1	0	6	0
Defenders
2	DF	(Japan) JPN	Hiroki Sakai	37	0	26+3	0	1	0	1	0	6	0
3	DF	(Spain) ESP	Álvaro	39	2	32	2	0	0	1	0	6	0
5	DF	(Argentina) ARG	Leonardo Balerdi	26	2	19+2	2	1	0	1	0	3	0
15	DF	(Croatia) CRO	Duje Ćaleta-Car	38	2	32+1	2	0	0	1	0	4	0
18	DF	(France) FRA	Jordan Amavi	18	1	10+3	1	0	0	0	0	5	0
20	DF	(France) FRA	Christopher Rocchia	3	0	0+2	0	0+1	0	0	0	0	0
25	DF	(Japan) JPN	Yuto Nagatomo	28	0	20+5	0	0	0	1	0	1+1	0
29	DF	(Spain) ESP	Pol Lirola	21	2	17+2	2	1	0	0+1	0	0	0
32	DF	(France) FRA	Lucas Perrin	7	1	3+4	1	0	0	0	0	0	0
42	DF	(France) FRA	Richecard Richard	0	0	0	0	0	0	0	0	0	0
	DF	(France) FRA	Aaron Kamardin	0	0	0	0	0	0	0	0	0	0
Midfielders
4	MF	(France) FRA	Boubacar Kamara	41	0	35	0	1	0	0	0	5	0
8	MF	(France) FRA	Olivier Ntcham	5	0	2+2	0	0+1	0	0	0	0	0
17	MF	(France) FRA	Michaël Cuisance	30	2	11+12	2	0+1	0	0	0	2+4	0
21	MF	(France) FRA	Valentin Rongier	34	1	21+5	1	1	0	1	0	5+1	0
22	MF	(France) FRA	Pape Gueye	38	2	22+10	2	1	0	1	0	2+2	0
24	MF	(Tunisia) TUN	Saîf-Eddine Khaoui	18	2	5+12	2	1	0	0	0	0	0
31	MF	(Italy) ITA	Franco Tongya	0	0	0	0	0	0	0	0	0	0
34	MF	(France) FRA	Alexandre Philiponeau	0	0	0	0	0	0	0	0	0	0
38	MF	(France) FRA	Ugo Bertelli	0	0	0	0	0	0	0	0	0	0
41	MF	(France) FRA	Cheick Souaré	1	0	0+1	0	0	0	0	0	0	0
43	MF	(France) FRA	Nassim Ahmed	0	0	0	0	0	0	0	0	0	0
Forwards
9	FW	(Argentina) ARG	Darío Benedetto	40	6	19+13	5	1	1	0+1	0	3+3	0
10	FW	(France) FRA	Dimitri Payet	40	10	28+5	7	0	0	1	1	4+2	2
11	FW	(Brazil) BRA	Luis Henrique	23	0	6+13	0	1	0	0	0	1+2	0
12	FW	(Senegal) SEN	Bamba Dieng	6	1	2+3	0	0+1	1	0	0	0	0
19	FW	(Poland) POL	Arkadiusz Milik	15	9	14+1	9	0	0	0	0	0	0
26	FW	(France) FRA	Florian Thauvin	44	8	33+3	8	0+1	0	1	0	6	0
28	FW	(France) FRA	Valère Germain	31	3	6+18	3	1	0	0+1	0	2+3	0
39	FW	(France) FRA	Jores Rahou	0	0	0	0	0	0	0	0	0	0
Players transferred out during the season
17	DF	(France) FRA	Bouna Sarr	2	0	0+2	0	0	0	0	0	0	0
27	MF	(France) FRA	Maxime Lopez	4	0	2+2	0	0	0	0	0	0	0
6	MF	(Netherlands) NED	Kevin Strootman	14	0	1+10	0	0	0	0	0	0+3	0
7	MF	(Serbia) SRB	Nemanja Radonjić	15	2	4+8	2	0	0	1	0	1+1	0
8	MF	(France) FRA	Morgan Sanson	19	2	10+2	2	0	0	0+1	0	4+2	0
23	FW	(France) FRA	Marley Aké	13	0	0+9	0	0	0	0	0	0+4	0
29	FW	(France) FRA	Florian Chabrolle	0	0	0	0	0	0	0	0	0	0
36	FW	(Greece) GRE	Kostas Mitroglou	0	0	0	0	0	0	0	0	0	0

Last updated: 23 May 2021
Source: Competitions

=== Goalscorers ===
Rank	No.	Pos.	Nat.	Name	Ligue 1	Coupe de France	Trophée des Champions	Champions League	Total
1	19	FW	(Poland)	Arkadiusz Milik	9	1	0	0	10
2	10	FW	(France)	Dimitri Payet	7	0	1	2	10
3	26	FW	(France)	Florian Thauvin	8	0	0	0	8
4	9	FW	(Argentina)	Darío Benedetto	5	1	0	0	6
5	28	FW	(France)	Valère Germain	3	0	0	0	3
6	3	DF	(Spain)	Álvaro	2	0	0	0	2
6	5	DF	(Argentina)	Leonardo Balerdi	2	0	0	0	2
6	7	MF	(Serbia)	Nemanja Radonjić	2	0	0	0	2
6	8	MF	(France)	Morgan Sanson	2	0	0	0	2
6	15	DF	(Croatia)	Duje Ćaleta-Car	2	0	0	0	2
6	17	MF	(France)	Michaël Cuisance	2	0	0	0	2
6	24	MF	(Tunisia)	Saîf-Eddine Khaoui	2	0	0	0	2
6	29	DF	(Spain)	Pol Lirola	2	0	0	0	2
14	18	DF	(France)	Jordan Amavi	1	0	0	0	1
14	21	MF	(France)	Valentin Rongier	1	0	0	0	1
14	22	MF	(France)	Pape Gueye	2	0	0	0	2
14	32	DF	(France)	Lucas Perrin	1	0	0	0	1
14	40	FW	(Senegal)	Bamba Dieng	0	1	0	0	1
Own goals					1	0	0	0	1
Totals					54	3	1	2	60
