= Darryl Bakola =

French footballer (born 2007)

Personal information
- Date of birth: 30 November 2007 (age 18)
- Place of birth: Clichy, France
- Height: 1.78 m (5 ft 10 in)
- Position: Midfielder

Team information
- Current team: Sassuolo
- Number: 50

Youth career
- 2014–2019: Asnières FC
- 2019–2020: Racing CF
- 2020–2022: Red Star
- 2022–2024: Marseille

Senior career*
Years	Team	Apps	(Gls)
2024–2026	Marseille B	6	(1)
2024–2026	Marseille	10	(0)
2026–	Sassuolo	12	(0)

International career^{‡}
2024	France U17	7	(1)
2025–	France U18	7	(1)
2025–	France U20	2	(0)
- * Club domestic league appearances and goals as of 09:48, 17 October 2026 (UTC) ‡ National team caps and goals as of 13 September 2026

Darryl Bakola (born 30 November 2007) is a French professional footballer who plays as a midfielder for Serie A club Sassuolo.

== Club career ==
Born in Clichy, Île-de-France, Bakola is a youth product of Racing, Red Star and Marseille. With the latter, he was central in their winning the 2024 Coupe Gambardella, their first title in the junior cup since 1979. During this victorious campaign, they knocked out the likes of Senny Mayulu and Ethan Mbappé's Paris or Mathis Lambourde and Aboubakar Nagida's Rennes, amongst others.

He also started featuring in the first team squad under Gennaro Gattuso during the 2023–24 season.

In September 2024, after reported negotiation that started in 2023, he signed his first professional contract with Marseille, soon after his friend Enzo Sternal signed his.

After making several bench appearances in 2024, without playing, as youngster struggled to find game time under De Zerbi, Bakola made his professional debut with Marseille in a 5–1 Ligue 1 win over Le Havre AC on 5 January 2025.

On 2 February 2026, Bakola signed with Sassuolo in Serie A.

== International career ==
Born in France, Bakola also has Republic of the Congo origins. He is a youth international for France, having played for the under-17.

== Career statistics ==
As of match played 16 October 2026

Appearances and goals by club, season and competition
Club	Season	League			Coupe de France		Europe		Other		Total	
Club	Season	Division	Apps	Goals	Apps	Goals	Apps	Goals	Apps	Goals	Apps	Goals
Marseille	2024–25	Ligue 1	2	0	0	0	—		—		2	0
Marseille	2025–26	Ligue 1	8	0	1	0	1 (Note: Appearance in UEFA Champions League)	0	0	0	10	0
Marseille	Total		10	0	1	0	1	0	0	0	12	0
Sassuolo	2025–26	Serie A	6	0	0	0	—		—		6	0
Sassuolo	2026–27	Serie A	6	0	2	0	—		—		8	0
Sassuolo	Total		12	0	2	0	0	0	0	0	14	0
Career total			22	0	3	0	1	0	0	0	26	0
