= Leonardo Balerdi =

Argentine footballer (born 1999)

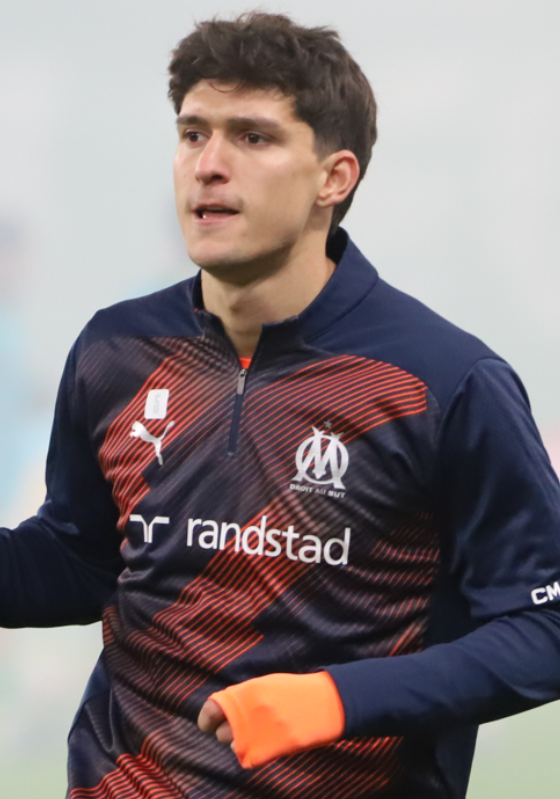
- Balerdi with Marseille in 2024

Personal information
- Full name: Leonardo Julián Balerdi Rosa
- Date of birth: 26 January 1999 (age 27)
- Place of birth: Villa Mercedes, Argentina
- Height: 1.87 m (6 ft 2 in)
- Position: Centre-back

Team information
- Current team: Roma (on loan from Marseille)
- Number: 26

Youth career
- 2005–2013: Sportivo Pueyrredón
- 2013–2018: Boca Juniors

Senior career*
Years	Team	Apps	(Gls)
2018–2019	Boca Juniors	5	(0)
2019–2020	Borussia Dortmund II	12	(1)
2019–2021	Borussia Dortmund	7	(0)
2020–2021	→ Marseille (loan)	21	(2)
2021–	Marseille	132	(2)
2026–	→ Roma (loan)	8	(2)

International career^{‡}
2018–2019	Argentina U20	9	(0)
2019	Argentina U23	1	(0)
2019–	Argentina	13	(0)
Medal record
Men's football
Representing Argentina
South American U-20 Championship
Silver medal – second place	2019	U-20 Team
- * Club domestic league appearances and goals as of 21:59, 21 November 2026 (UTC) ‡ National team caps and goals as of 03:35, 4 October 2026 (UTC)

Leonardo Julián Balerdi Rosa (born 26 January 1999) is an Argentine professional footballer who plays as a centre-back for Serie A club Roma, on loan from Ligue 1 club Marseille, and the Argentina national team.

== Club career ==
=== Boca Juniors ===
Balerdi made his debut for Boca Juniors in the Argentine Primera División starting against Huracán on 27 August 2018. Although only appearing five times for Boca Juniors (a total of 450 minutes on the pitch), Balerdi's performances took Argentinian football by storm and he has rapidly been hailed as Argentina's best upcoming defender.

=== Borussia Dortmund ===
In January 2019, Balerdi agreed to a four-and-a-half-year contract with Borussia Dortmund. According to several Argentine reports, Dortmund has agreed to pay €15 million for the central defender. An additional €2 million might need to be paid due to agreed add-ons.

Balerdi made his Dortmund and Bundesliga debut on 7 December 2019 against Fortuna Düsseldorf coming onto the pitch as a substitute in the 78th minute. After a few substitute appearances, Balerdi made his first start against 1899 Hoffenheim in the last Bundesliga fixture of the 2019–20 season. He was substituted in the 65th minute as Dortmund trailed 4–0.

=== Marseille ===
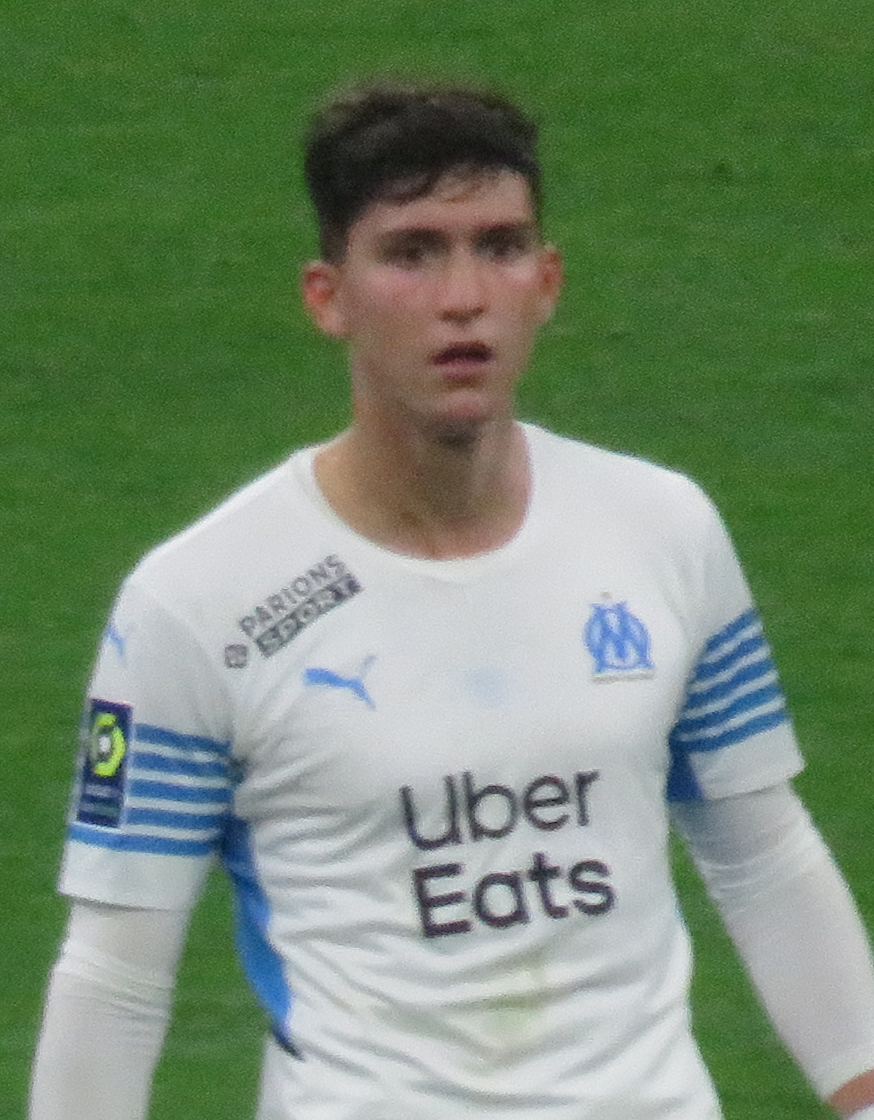
Balerdi with Marseille in 2021

In July 2020, Balerdi signed with Marseille on a year-long loan, with an option to buy for €15 million. On 3 July 2021, he joined Marseille permanently, signing a five-year contract with the club.

At the start of the 2024–25 season, Balerdi extended his contract by two more years until 2028, while also being promoted two captain of the team.

=== Roma ===
On 30 August 2026, Balerdi joined Serie A club Roma on a one-year loan with an option for purchase. Balerdi made his debut appearancce for Roma in a 2-1 win at home against Atalanta in the 66th minute. Balerdi scored his first goals for Roma on 24 October 2026, when he scored 2 goals after coming off the bench in a 3-3 draw away to Napoli.

== International career ==
Balerdi debuted for the Argentina senior squad on 10 September 2019 in a friendly match against Mexico, replacing Lucas Martínez Quarta in the 83rd minute.

On 28 May 2026, he was named in the 26-man squad for the 2026 FIFA World Cup. However, he sustained a calf injury on 6 June, which forced him to withdraw from the competition.

== Career statistics ==
=== Club ===
As of match played 21 November 2026

Appearances and goals by club, season and competition
Club	Season	League			National cup (Note: Includes Coupe de France)		Continental		Other		Total	
Club	Season	Division	Apps	Goals	Apps	Goals	Apps	Goals	Apps	Goals	Apps	Goals
Boca Juniors	2018–19	Argentine Primera División	5	0	0	0	0	0	—		5	0
Borussia Dortmund II	2018–19	Regionalliga West	4	1	—		—		—		4	1
Borussia Dortmund II	2019–20	Regionalliga West	8	0	—		—		—		8	0
Borussia Dortmund II	Total		12	1	—		—		—		12	1
Borussia Dortmund	2019–20	Bundesliga	7	0	0	0	1 (Note: Appearance(s) in UEFA Champions League)	0	—		8	0
Marseille (loan)	2020–21	Ligue 1	21	2	1	0	3	0	0	0	25	2
Marseille	2021–22	Ligue 1	17	0	3	0	4 (Note: Two appearances in UEFA Europa League, two appearances in UEFA Conference League)	0	—		24	0
Marseille	2022–23	Ligue 1	35	0	3	0	6	1	—		44	1
Marseille	2023–24	Ligue 1	27	2	2	0	13 (Note: One appearance in UEFA Champions League, twelve appearances in UEFA Europa League)	0	—		42	2
Marseille	2024–25	Ligue 1	27	0	2	0	—		—		29	0
Marseille	2025–26	Ligue 1	26	0	3	1	6	0	1 (Note: Appearance in Trophée des Champions)	0	36	1
Marseille	Marseille total		144	4	13	1	30	1	1	0	200	6
Roma (loan)	2026–27	Serie A	8	2	0	0	4	0	—		12	2
Career total			185	7	14	1	37	1	1	0	237	9

=== International ===
As of match played 3 October 2026

Appearances and goals by national team and year
National team	Year	Apps	Goals
Argentina	2019	2	0
Argentina	2024	3	0
Argentina	2025	6	0
Argentina	2026	2	0
Total		13	0

== Honours ==
Boca Juniors

- Copa Libertadores runner-up: 2018

Marseille

- Trophée des Champions runner-up: 2020

Argentina U17

- South American U-20 Championship runner-up: 2019
