= Cheick Souaré =

French footballer (born 2002)

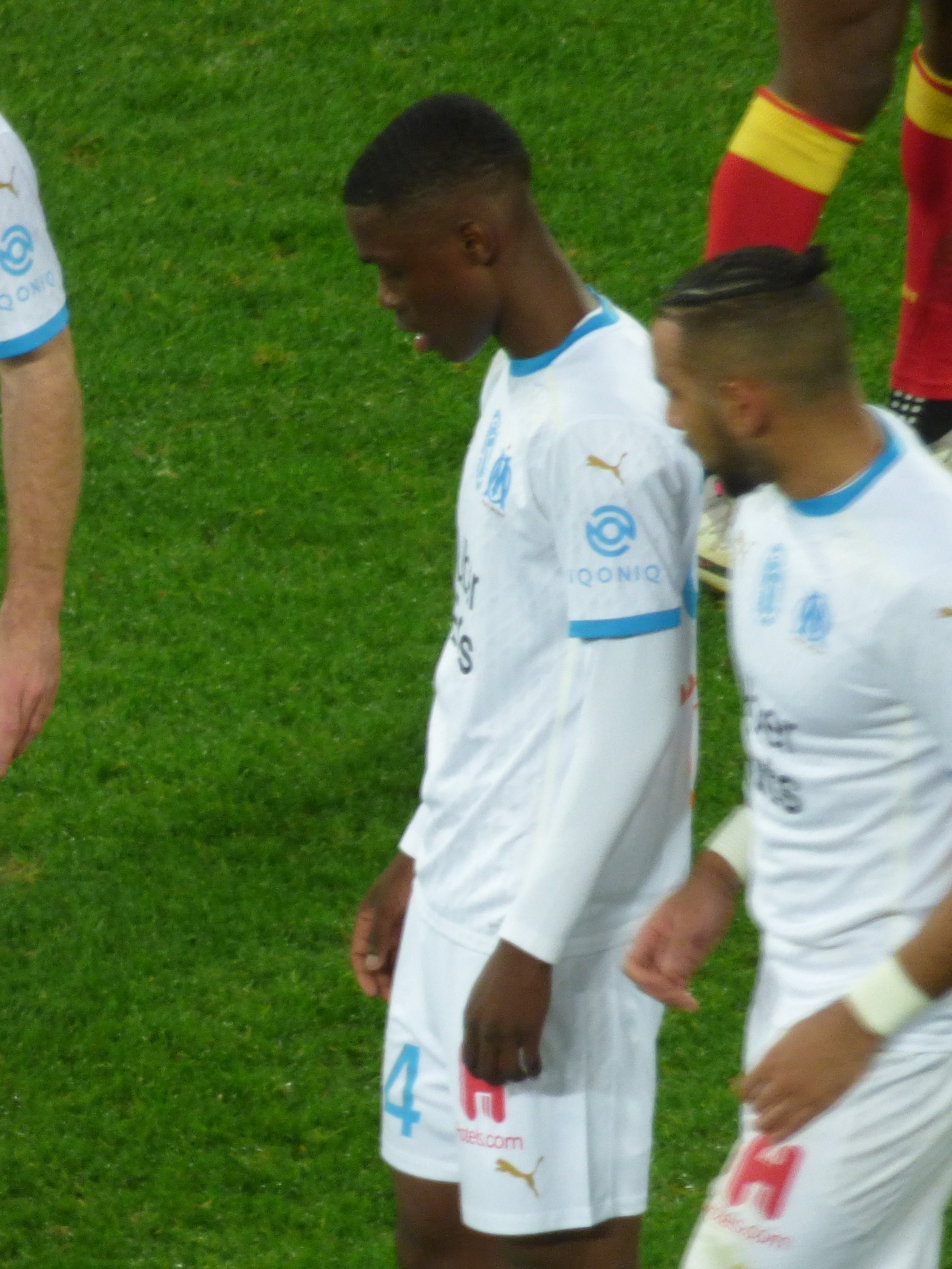
- Souaré in 2021

Personal information
- Full name: Cheick Oumar Souaré
- Date of birth: 3 September 2002 (age 24)
- Place of birth: Arras, France
- Height: 1.85 m (6 ft 1 in)
- Position: Midfielder

Team information
- Current team: Viktoria Plzeň
- Number: 19

Youth career
- 2009–2014: Martigues
- 2014–2015: Istres
- 2015–2020: Marseille

Senior career*
Years	Team	Apps	(Gls)
2019–2022	Marseille II	20	(3)
2020–2022	Marseille	1	(0)
2023–2024	Vyškov	30	(2)
2024	→ Viktoria Plzeň (loan)	13	(2)
2024–	Viktoria Plzeň	38	(3)

International career^{‡}
2018	France U16	4	(0)
- * Club domestic league appearances and goals as of 5 September 2026 ‡ National team caps and goals as of 3 February 2021

Cheick Oumar Souaré (born 3 September 2002) is a French professional footballer who plays as a midfielder for Czech First League club Viktoria Plzeň.

== Early life ==
Born in Arras, Pas-de-Calais, he started playing football with FC Martigues in the south of France, aged seven. He later played for FC Istres, before joining Marseille in 2015. He signed his first professional contract with the club in June 2020.

== Club career ==
He was first included in Marseille's squad in February 2021, as the club was going on a losing streak with several internal tensions and supporters riots, eventually leading to the departure of André Villas-Boas.

Souaré made his professional debut for Olympique de Marseille on the 3 February 2021, coming up as a substitute in the 2–2 draw against Lens.

On 5 January 2024, Souaré joined Czech First League club Viktoria Plzeň on a half-year loan deal. On 5 June 2024, Souaré signed a three-year contract with Viktoria Plzeň.

== International career ==
Born in France, Souaré is of Guinean descent. He is a youth international for France.

== Career statistics ==
=== Club ===
As of 19 June 2024

Club	Season	League			Cup		Continental		Other		Total	
Club	Season	Division	Apps	Goals	Apps	Goals	Apps	Goals	Apps	Goals	Apps	Goals
Marseille	2020–21	Ligue 1	1	0	0	0	—		—		1	0
Vyškov	2022–23	Czech National Football League	15	0	1	0	—		—		16	0
Vyškov	2023–24	Czech National Football League	15	2	3	0	—		—		18	2
Vyškov	Total		30	2	4	0	—		—		34	2
Viktoria Plzeň (loan)	2023–24	Czech First League	13	2	3	1	0	0	—		16	3
Career total			44	4	7	1	0	0	0	0	51	5
