= 2020 Botafogo FR season =

Botafogo
2020 season
- Manager: Alberto Valentim (until 10 February 2020); Paulo Autuori (12 February–1 October); Bruno Lazaroni (2–28 October); Ramón Díaz (29 October–27 November); Eduardo Barroca (28 November 2020–6 February 2021); Lúcio Flávio (7–27 February 2021)
- Série A: 20th (relegated)
- Campeonato Carioca: Semi-finals
- Copa do Brasil: Round of 16
- Biggest defeat: São Paulo 4–0 Botafogo

The 2020 season was the 116th season for Botafogo de Futebol e Regatas and their fifth consecutive season in the Brazilian top division. The team also competed in the Campeonato Carioca and the Copa do Brasil. They suffered relegation after finishing in last place, securing only 7 points in the second half of the season.

== Competitions ==
=== Overall record ===
Competition	First match	Last match	Starting round	Final position	Record							
Competition	First match	Last match	Starting round	Final position	Pld	W	D	L	GF	GA	GD	Win %
Campeonato Brasileiro Série A	13 August 2020	26 February 2021	Matchday 1	20th	38	5	12	21	32	62	−30	13.16
Campeonato Carioca	18 January 2020	5 July 2020	Taça Guanabara	Taça Rio semi-finals	12	5	3	4	14	15	−1	41.67
Copa do Brasil	19 February 2020	3 November 2020	Second round	Round of 16	7	3	3	1	5	3	+2	42.86
Total					57	13	18	26	51	80	−29	22.81

Source: Competitions

=== Série A ===
==== League table ====
Pos	Team	Pld	W	D	L	GF	GA	GD	Pts	Qualification or relegation
16	Fortaleza	38	10	11	17	34	44	−10	41	
17	Vasco da Gama (R)	38	10	11	17	37	56	−19	41	Relegation to Campeonato Brasileiro Série B
18	Goiás (R)	38	9	10	19	41	63	−22	37	Relegation to Campeonato Brasileiro Série B
19	Coritiba (R)	38	7	10	21	31	54	−23	31	Relegation to Campeonato Brasileiro Série B
20	Botafogo (R)	38	5	12	21	32	62	−30	27	Relegation to Campeonato Brasileiro Série B

Source: CBF
Rules for classification: 1) points; 2) wins; 3) goal difference; 4) goals scored; 5) head-to-head results (only between 2 teams); 6) fewest red cards; 7) fewest yellow cards; 8) draw.
(R) Relegated

==== Results summary ====
Overall								Home						Away					
Pld	W	D	L	GF	GA	GD	Pts	W	D	L	GF	GA	GD	W	D	L	GF	GA	GD
38	5	12	21	32	62	−30	27	3	5	11	16	30	−14	2	7	10	16	32	−16

==== Results by round ====
Round	1
Ground	
Result	
Position	

A = Away; H = Home; W = Win; D = Draw; L = Loss

==== Matches ====
The match schedule was released on 9 July 2020.

13 August 2020 2	Red Bull Bragantino	1–1	Botafogo

17 August 2020 3	Fortaleza	0–0	Botafogo

20 August 2020 4	Botafogo	2–1	Atlético Mineiro	Rio de Janeiro
				Stadium: Estádio Nilton Santos

23 August 2020 5	Flamengo	1–1	Botafogo	Rio de Janeiro

29 August 2020 6	Botafogo	0–2	Internacional	Rio de Janeiro
				Stadium: Estádio Nilton Santos

3 September 2020 7	Botafogo	0–0	Coritiba	Rio de Janeiro
				Stadium: Estádio Nilton Santos

6 September 2020 8	Corinthians	2–2	Botafogo

9 September 2020 9	Athletico Paranaense	1–1	Botafogo

14 September 2020 10	Botafogo	2–3	Vasco da Gama	Rio de Janeiro
				Stadium: Estádio Nilton Santos

20 September 2020 11	Botafogo	0–0	Santos	Rio de Janeiro
				Stadium: Estádio Nilton Santos

27 September 2020 12	Atlético Goianiense	1–1	Botafogo

1 October 2020 1	Botafogo	1–2	Bahia	Rio de Janeiro
				Stadium: Estádio Nilton Santos
Note: The match, initially scheduled for 9 August 2020, was postponed to accommodate Bahia's participation in the second leg of the Campeonato Baiano final against Atlético de Alagoinhas.

4 October 2020 13	Botafogo	1–1	Fluminense	Rio de Janeiro
				Stadium: Estádio Nilton Santos

8 October 2020 14	Botafogo	2–1	Palmeiras	Rio de Janeiro
				Stadium: Estádio Nilton Santos

11 October 2020 15	Sport	1–2	Botafogo	Recife

15 October 2020 16	Grêmio	3–1	Botafogo

20 October 2020 17	Botafogo	0–0	Goiás	Rio de Janeiro
				Stadium: Estádio Nilton Santos

31 October 2020 19	Botafogo	2–2	Ceará	Rio de Janeiro
				Stadium: Estádio Nilton Santos

8 November 2020 20	Bahia	1–0	Botafogo

17 November 2020 21	Botafogo	1–2	Red Bull Bragantino	Rio de Janeiro
				Stadium: Estádio Nilton Santos

22 November 2020 22	Botafogo	1–2	Fortaleza	Rio de Janeiro
				Stadium: Estádio Nilton Santos

26 November 2020 23	Atlético Mineiro	2–1	Botafogo

5 December 2020 24	Botafogo	0–1	Flamengo	Rio de Janeiro
				Stadium: Estádio Nilton Santos

10 December 2020 18	São Paulo	4–0	Botafogo	São Paulo

12 December 2020 25	Internacional	2–1	Botafogo

20 December 2020 26	Coritiba	1–2	Botafogo	Curitiba

27 December 2020 27	Botafogo	0–2	Corinthians	Rio de Janeiro
				Stadium: Estádio Nilton Santos

6 January 2021 28	Botafogo	0–2	Athletico Paranaense	Rio de Janeiro
				Stadium: Estádio Nilton Santos

11 January 2021 29	Vasco da Gama	3–0	Botafogo	Rio de Janeiro

17 January 2021 30	Santos	2–1	Botafogo

20 January 2021 31	Botafogo	1–3	Atlético Goianiense	Rio de Janeiro
				Stadium: Estádio Nilton Santos

25 January 2021 32	Fluminense	2–0	Botafogo	Rio de Janeiro

2 February 2021 33	Palmeiras	1–1	Botafogo

6 February 2021 34	Botafogo	0–1	Sport	Rio de Janeiro
				Stadium: Estádio Nilton Santos

9 February 2021 35	Botafogo	2–5	Grêmio	Rio de Janeiro
				Stadium: Estádio Nilton Santos

13 February 2021 36	Goiás	2–0	Botafogo

23 February 2021 37	Botafogo	1–0	São Paulo	Rio de Janeiro
				Stadium: Estádio Nilton Santos

26 February 2021 38	Ceará	2–1	Botafogo

=== Campeonato Carioca ===
==== Taça Guanabara ====
18 January 2020 1	Volta Redonda	1–0	Botafogo	Volta Redonda
				Stadium: Estádio Raulino de Oliveira

21 January 2020 2	Madureira	2–0	Botafogo

26 January 2020 3	Botafogo	3–1	Macaé	Rio de Janeiro
				Stadium: Estádio Nilton Santos

30 January 2020 4	Botafogo	2–1	Resende	Rio de Janeiro
				Stadium: Estádio Nilton Santos

2 February 2020 5	Botafogo	1–0	Vasco da Gama	Rio de Janeiro
				Stadium: Estádio Nilton Santos

9 February 2020 6	Fluminense	3–0	Botafogo

==== Taça Rio ====
1 March 2020 1	Botafogo	2–1	Boavista	Rio de Janeiro
				Stadium: Estádio Nilton Santos

7 March 2020 2	Flamengo	3–0	Botafogo

15 March 2020 3	Botafogo	1–1	Bangu	Rio de Janeiro
				Stadium: Estádio Nilton Santos

28 June 2020 4	Botafogo	6–2	Cabofriense	Rio de Janeiro
				Stadium: Estádio Nilton Santos

2 July 2020 5	Portuguesa	0–0	Botafogo

===== Semi-finals =====
5 July 2020	Fluminense	0–0	Botafogo	Rio de Janeiro
				Stadium: Estádio Nilton Santos; Attendance: 0 Referee: Wagner do Nascimento Magalhaes

=== Copa do Brasil ===
==== Second round ====
19 February 2020 Second round	Náutico	1–1 (3–4 p)	Botafogo	Recife
		Report		Stadium: Estádio dos Aflitos; Referee: André Castro

==== Third round ====
10 March 2020 First leg	Botafogo	1–0	Paraná	Rio de Janeiro
				Stadium: Estádio Nilton Santos

27 August 2020 Second leg	Paraná	1–2 (1–3 agg.)	Botafogo

==== Fourth round ====
18 September 2020 First leg	Botafogo	1–0	Vasco da Gama	Rio de Janeiro
				Stadium: Estádio Nilton Santos

24 September 2020 Second leg	Vasco da Gama	0–0 (0–1 agg.)	Botafogo	Rio de Janeiro

==== Round of 16 ====
28 October 2020 First leg	Botafogo	0–1	Cuiabá	Rio de Janeiro
				Stadium: Estádio Nilton Santos

3 November 2020 Second leg	Cuiabá	0–0 (1–0 agg.)	Botafogo	Cuiabá
				Stadium: Arena Pantanal; Referee: Ricardo Marques Ribeiro
