= Enzo Sternal =

French footballer (born 2007)

Personal information
- Date of birth: 28 May 2007 (age 19)
- Place of birth: Nancy, France
- Height: 1.74 m (5 ft 9 in)
- Position: Forward

Team information
- Current team: RSCA Futures
- Number: 28

Youth career
- 2012–2022: Nancy
- 2022–: Marseille

Senior career*
Years	Team	Apps	(Gls)
2024–2025	Marseille II	3	(1)
2024–2025	Marseille	2	(0)
2025–	RSCA Futures	17	(3)

International career^{‡}
2022–2023	France U16	11	(3)
2023–2024	France U17	11	(3)
2024	France U18	3	(0)
- * Club domestic league appearances and goals as of 20 April 2026 ‡ National team caps and goals as of 16 November 2024

Enzo Sternal (born 27 May 2007) is a French professional footballer who plays as a forward for Challenger Pro League club RSCA Futures. He is considered as one of the most talented young players from France.

== Club career ==
Born in Nancy, Sternal started playing football in the youth team of AS Nancy Lorraine before joining the youth side of Olympique de Marseille in 2022. On 12 January 2024 he made his debut for Marseille reserve team in a National 3 match against Istres.

On 17 January 2025, Sternal signed a two-and-a-half-year contract with Anderlecht in Belgium, and was assigned to their reserve team RSCA Futures that plays in the second-tier Challenger Pro League.

== International career ==
Born in France, Sternal is of Algerian descent through his mother. He has represented the France national U16 and U17 teams. In May 2024, he was called up in France U17's 20-men squad for the Euro U17.

== Career statistics ==
As of match played 20 October 2024

Appearances and goals by club, season and competition
Club	Season	League			Cup		Europe		Other		Total	
Club	Season	Division	Apps	Goals	Apps	Goals	Apps	Goals	Apps	Goals	Apps	Goals
Marseille II	2023–24	National 3	1	0	—		—		—		1	0
Marseille	2024–25	Ligue 1	2	0	0	0	—		—		2	0
Career total			3	0	0	0	0	0	0	0	3	0
