= Duje Ćaleta-Car =

Croatian footballer (born 1996)

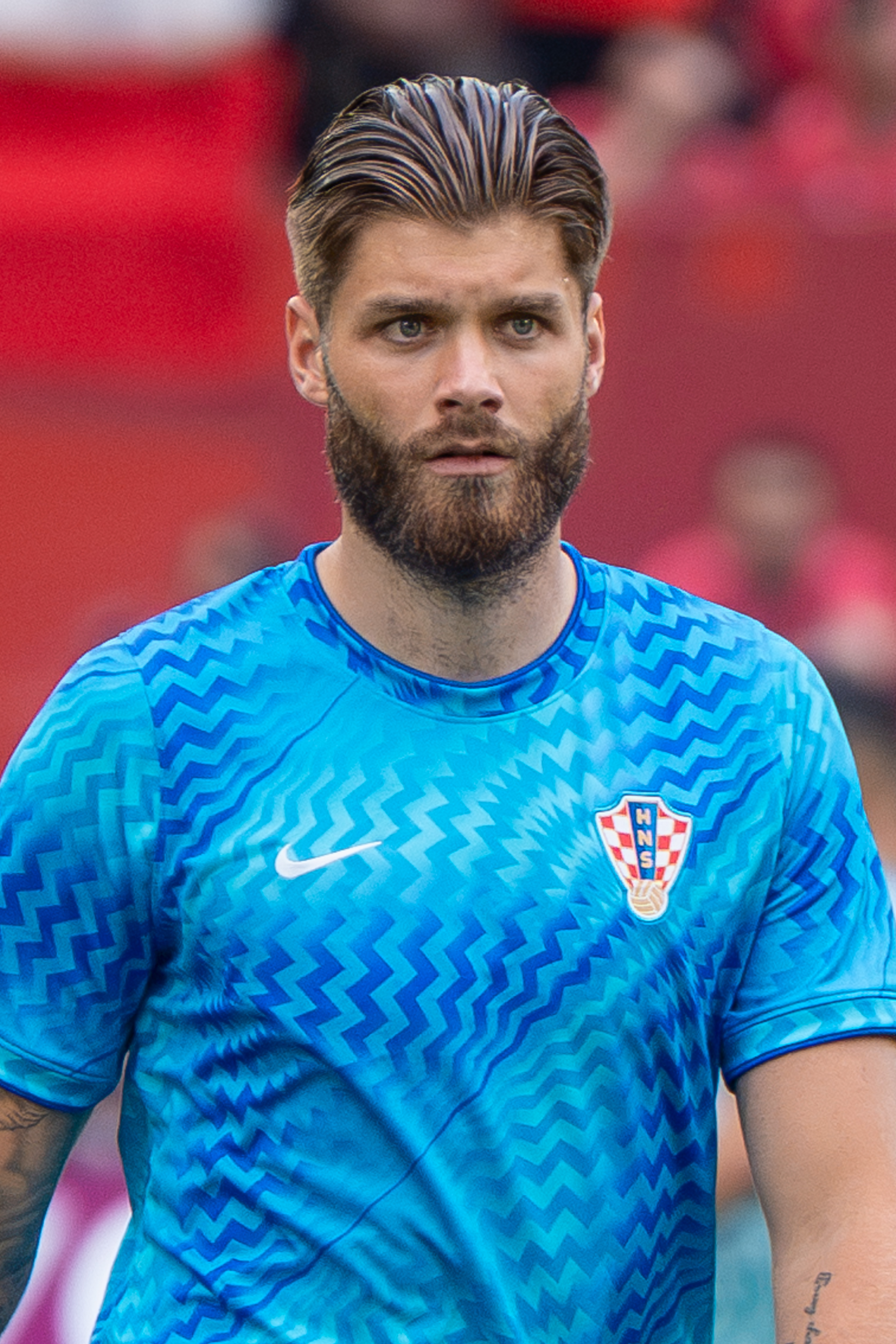
- Ćaleta-Car with Croatia in 2026

Personal information
- Full name: Duje Ćaleta-Car
- Date of birth: 17 September 1996 (age 30)
- Place of birth: Šibenik, Croatia
- Height: 1.93 m (6 ft 4 in)
- Position: Centre-back

Team information
- Current team: Sassuolo
- Number: 15

Youth career
- 2005–2012: Šibenik

Senior career*
Years	Team	Apps	(Gls)
2012–2013	Šibenik	17	(0)
2013–2014	Pasching	15	(3)
2014–2018	Red Bull Salzburg	84	(4)
2014–2015	→ Liefering (loan)	20	(0)
2018–2022	Marseille	103	(5)
2022–2024	Southampton	13	(1)
2023–2024	→ Lyon (loan)	24	(0)
2024–2026	Lyon	43	(1)
2025–2026	→ Real Sociedad (loan)	27	(1)
2026–	Sassuolo	7	(0)

International career^{‡}
2012–2013	Croatia U17	12	(1)
2013–2014	Croatia U18	4	(0)
2014–2015	Croatia U19	10	(2)
2014–2018	Croatia U21	17	(3)
2018–	Croatia	39	(1)
Medal record
Men's football
Representing Croatia
FIFA World Cup
Runner-up	2018 Russia
- * Club domestic league appearances and goals as of 06:13, 13 November 2026 (UTC) ‡ National team caps and goals as of 23:23, 15 November 2026 (UTC)

Duje Ćaleta-Car (Croatian pronunciation: [dǔːje tɕâleta tsâr]; born 17 September 1996) is a Croatian professional footballer who plays as a centre-back for Serie A club Sassuolo and the Croatia national team.

A former Croatian youth international across numerous levels, Ćaleta-Car first appeared with the senior side after being selected for the 2018 FIFA World Cup. At the tournament, his country reached runners-up. He then was chosen in the squads for the UEFA Euro 2020 and the 2026 FIFA World Cup.

== Club career ==
=== Early career ===
Ćaleta-Car joined FC Liefering in 2014 from FC Pasching. He made his Austrian Football First League debut with FC Liefering on 25 July 2014 against FAC Team für Wien.

=== Red Bull Salzburg ===
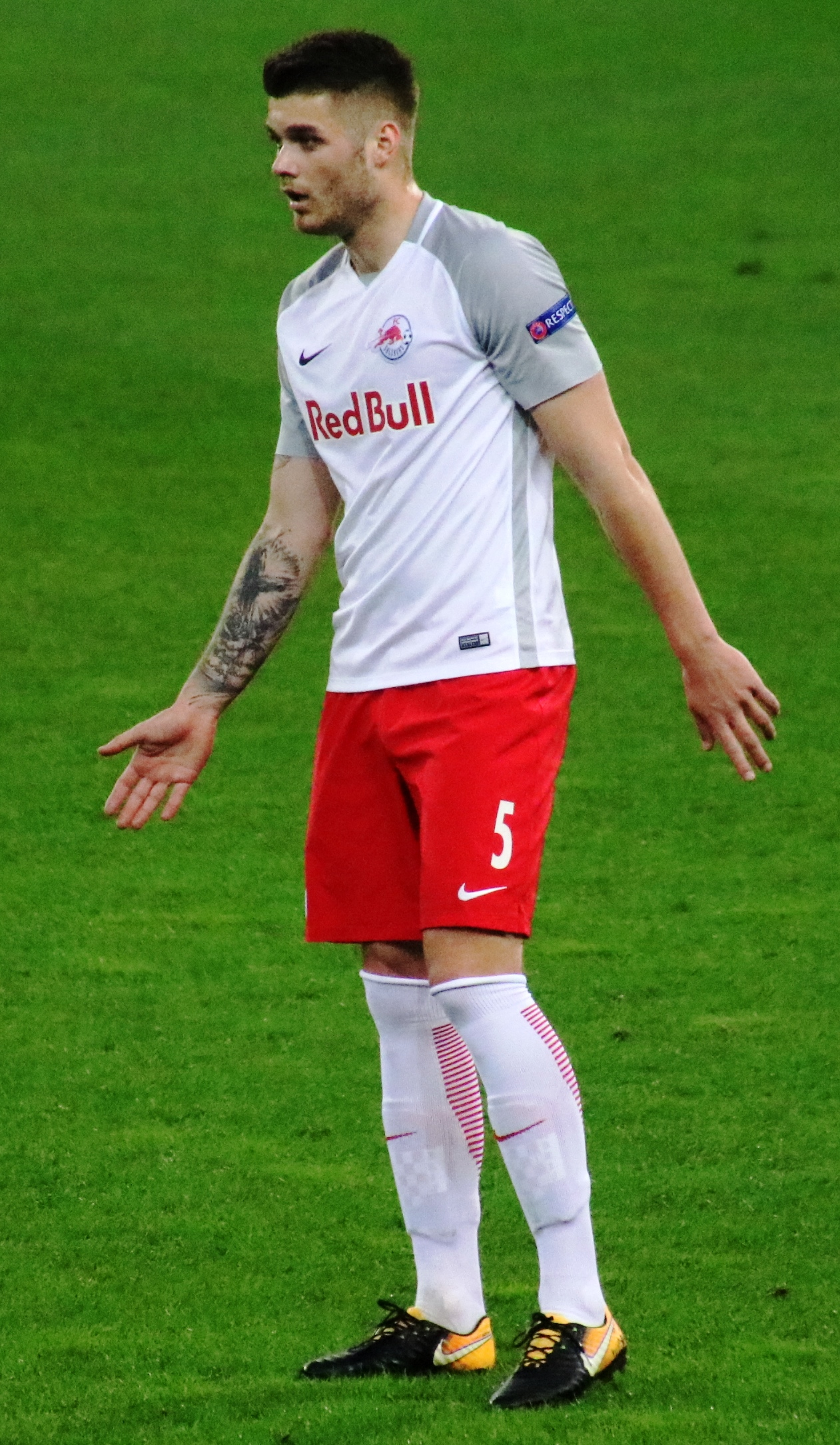
Ćaleta-Car with Red Bull Salzburg in 2018

During the 2017–18 season Salzburg had their best ever European campaign. They finished top of their Europa League group, for a record fourth time, before beating Real Sociedad and Borussia Dortmund thus making their first ever appearance in a UEFA Europa League semi-final. On 3 May 2018, he played in the Europa League semi-final as Marseille played out a 1–2 away loss but a 3–2 aggregate win to secure a place in the 2018 UEFA Europa League Final.

=== Marseille ===
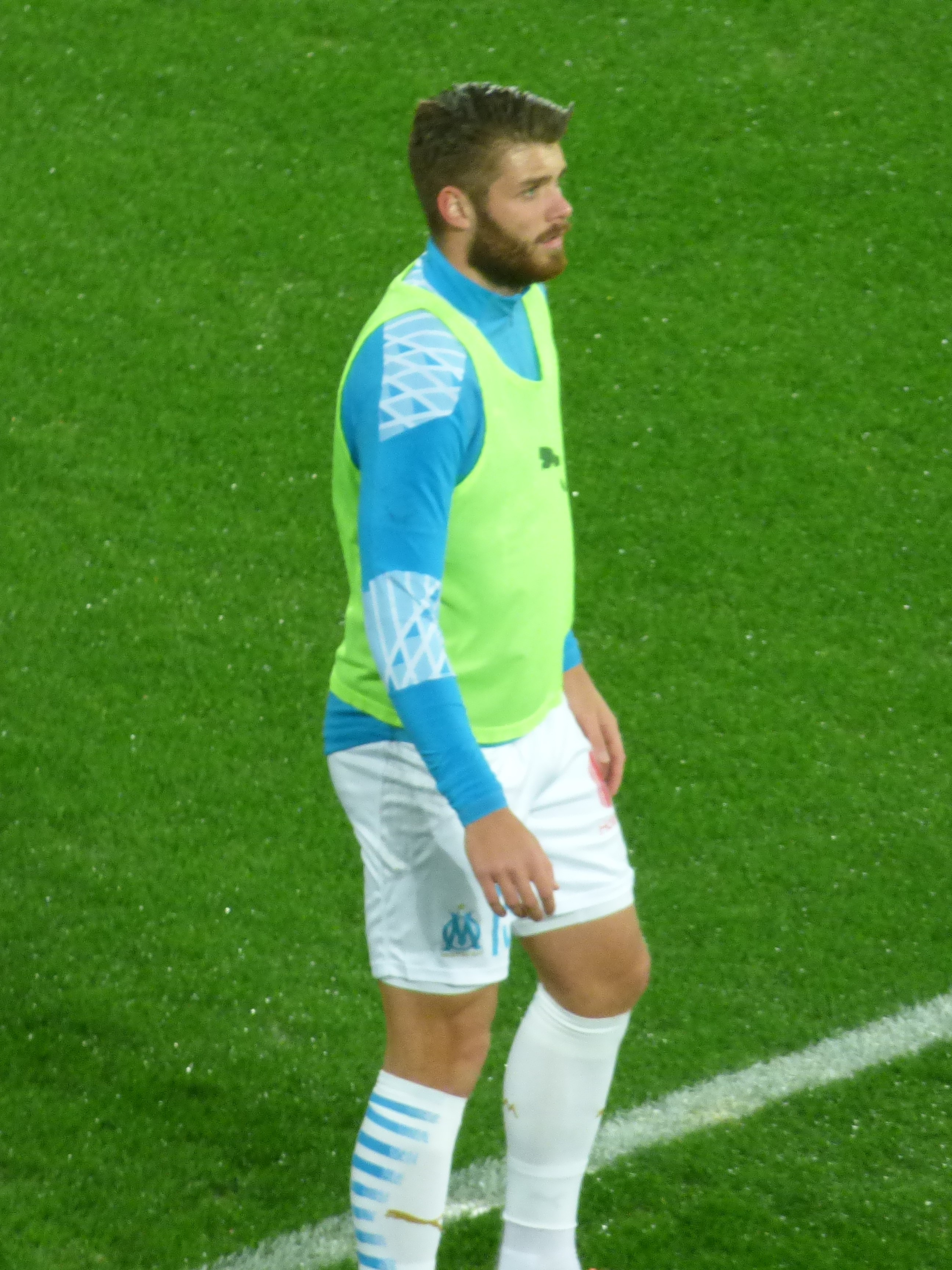
Ćaleta-Car warming up for Marseille in 2021

On 20 July 2018, Ćaleta-Car joined Marseille on a five-year deal for a transfer fee of €19 million. Upon his arrival, Ćaleta-Car was given the squad shirt number 15.

On 29 September 2019, he scored his first goal for Marseille, the equalizer in a 1–1 draw with Rennes.

At the start of the 2020–21 season, Ćaleta-Car scored a brace against Brest, converting assists of Florian Thauvin, as Marseille won 3–2. At the end of the January 2021 transfer window, Premier League side Liverpool launched a £23 million bid to secure his services but the move failed to materialize as Marseille didn't have enough time to sign a replacement.

=== Southampton ===
On 1 September 2022, Ćaleta-Car joined Southampton on a four-year contract. On 1 October, Ćaleta-Car made his Premier League debut in a 1–2 defeat against Everton. In the EFL Cup semi-final first leg against Newcastle United on 24 January 2023, Ćaleta-Car was given a second yellow card and sent off following a foul on Allan Saint-Maximin. On 1 March, Ćaleta-Car scored his first professional goal for Southampton in a 1–2 defeat to Grimsby Town in the FA Cup. He scored his first league goal on 21 April in a 3–3 away draw at Arsenal.

=== Lyon ===
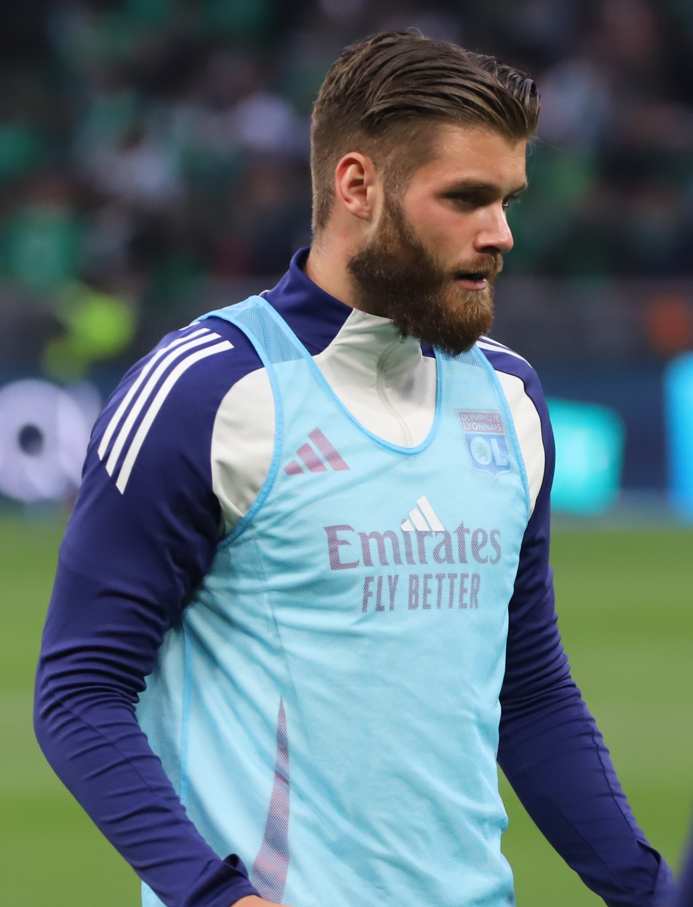
Ćaleta-Car training with Lyon in 2025

On 2 August 2023, Ćaleta-Car joined Lyon on a season-long loan. Ćaleta-Car made his debut for the club on 13 August 2023 in a 2–1 defeat to Strasbourg. On 8 July 2024, he joined the club permanently and signed a three-year contract.

==== Loan to Real Sociedad ====
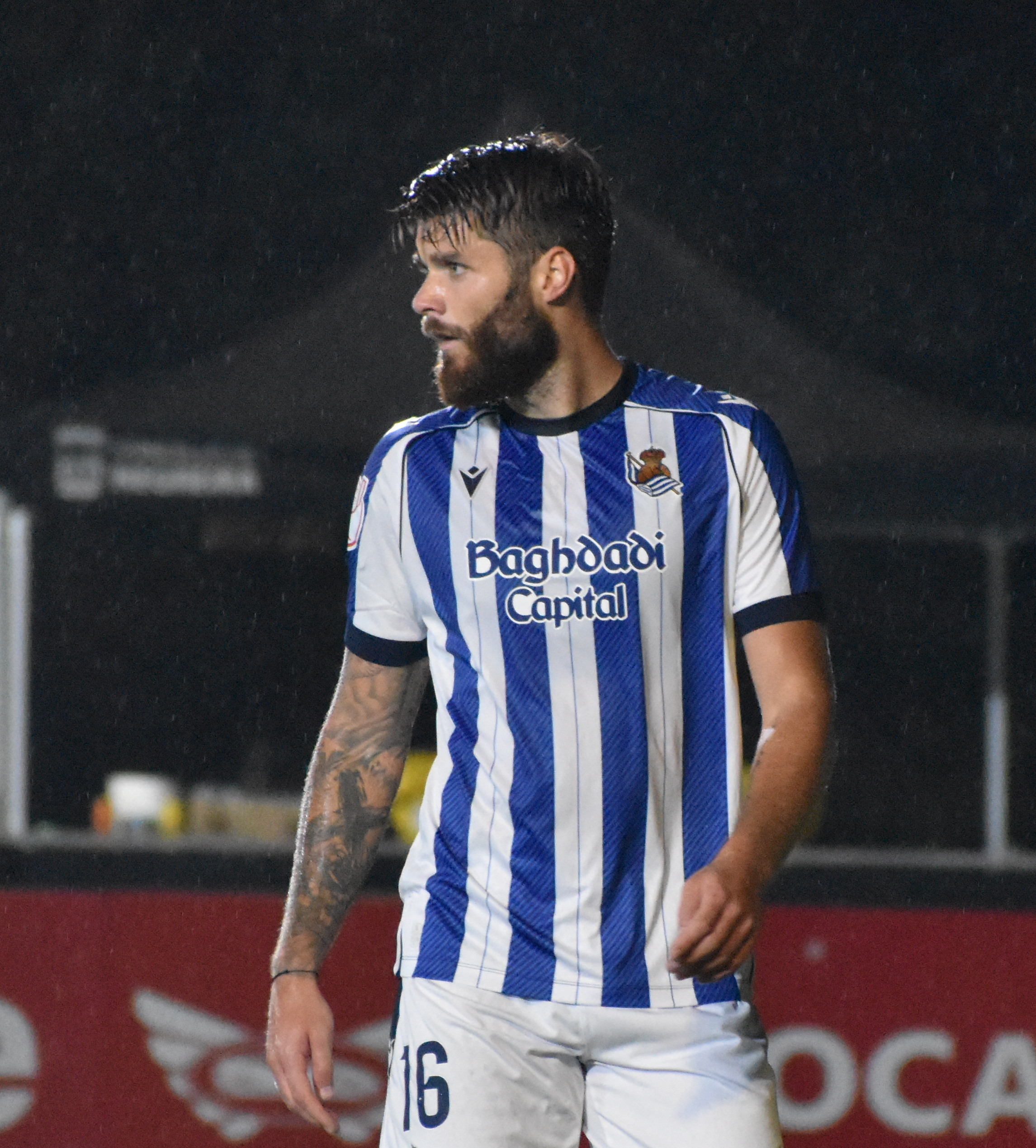
Ćaleta-Car with Real Sociedad in 2025

On 1 August 2025, Ćaleta-Car moved to La Liga side Real Sociedad on a one-year loan deal with an option to buy for €3 million.

=== Sassuolo ===
On 1 September 2026, Ćaleta-Car joined Italian side Sassuolo.

== International career ==
In October 2015, Ćaleta-Car received a first call-up for the senior national team for the Euro 2016 qualifying matches against Bulgaria and Malta, as a replacement for injured Jozo Šimunović. He was in the first 27 players team called for the Euro 2016 but was dropped along with midfielder Alen Halilović and goalkeeper Dominik Livaković.

In May 2018, he was named in Croatia's preliminary 32-man squad for the 2018 World Cup in Russia. On 3 June, he made his international debut in a friendly match against Brazil, coming on as a substitute for Vedran Ćorluka in the 52nd minute.

In June 2019, he refused to be part of Croatia squad for 2019 UEFA Under-21 Euro, citing exhaustion and the club's demand to take a rest for the upcoming season as reasons. Soon it was discovered that the real reason was a vacation in the Maldives with his club teammate Nemanja Radonjić. As a disciplinary action, he was the only outfield player who wasn't given even a minute of playing time in senior Croatia squad's June fixtures against Wales and Tunisia and was completely dropped ahead of September fixtures against Slovakia and Azerbaijan. In an interview with Sportske novosti, he denied going on the vacation and said that the sole reason of not participating in the tournament was suggestion of his club coaches Andoni Zubizarreta and André Villas-Boas to take a rest instead since his previous season was not on the level it was expected to be, partially due to his participation in the World Cup the summer before, and that it was not his personal wish. He also claimed that the Croatia U21 manager Nenad Gračan "had lied and had disappointed him", that "it had hurt him to read the lies of the media" about the vacation, and that he accepted Croatia manager Zlatko Dalić's decision to drop him from the team.

Ćaleta-Car was recalled to the squad ahead of Croatia's November fixtures against Slovakia and Georgia following suspensions of the standard starting defenders Dejan Lovren and Domagoj Vida. He was a starter in the decisive match against the former opponent that ended in a 3–1 victory, leading Croatia to qualify for UEFA Euro 2020.

On 18 May 2026, Ćaleta-Car was selected in the 26-man squad for the 2026 FIFA World Cup.

== Personal life ==
In May 2021, Ćaleta-Car married Adriana Đurđević in a civil ceremony at the top of the Revelin Fortress in Đurđević's native Dubrovnik. In August 2021, Ćaleta-Car and Đurđević became parents of a baby son, whom they named Mauro. In June 2022, Ćaleta-Car and Đurđević married in a church ceremony in the St. Ignatius Church in Dubrovnik.

== Career statistics ==
=== Club ===
As of match played 7 November 2026

Appearances and goals by club, season and competition
Club	Season	League			National cup (Note: Includes Croatian Cup, Austrian Cup, Coupe de France, FA Cup, Copa del Rey)		League cup (Note: Includes Coupe de la Ligue, EFL Cup)		Continental		Other		Total	
Club	Season	Division	Apps	Goals	Apps	Goals	Apps	Goals	Apps	Goals	Apps	Goals	Apps	Goals
Šibenik	2012–13	Druga HNL	17	0	0	0	—		—		—		17	0
Pasching	2013–14	Austrian Regionalliga	15	3	0	0	—		—		—		15	3
Liefering (loan)	2014–15	Erste Liga	19	0	0	0	—		—		—		19	0
Liefering (loan)	2015–16	Erste Liga	1	0	0	0	—		—		—		1	0
Liefering (loan)	Total		20	0	0	0	—		—		—		20	0
Red Bull Salzburg	2014–15	Austrian Bundesliga	7	0	1	0	—		1 (Note: Appearance(s) in UEFA Europa League)	0	—		9	0
Red Bull Salzburg	2015–16	Austrian Bundesliga	31	2	4	0	—		2	0	—		37	2
Red Bull Salzburg	2016–17	Austrian Bundesliga	18	0	5	0	—		8 (Note: Five appearances in UEFA Champions League, three appearances in UEFA Europa League)	0	—		31	0
Red Bull Salzburg	2017–18	Austrian Bundesliga	28	2	6	0	—		19 (Note: Four appearances in UEFA Champions League, fifteen appearances in UEFA Europa League)	0	—		53	2
Red Bull Salzburg	Total		84	4	16	0	—		30	0	—		130	4
Marseille	2018–19	Ligue 1	20	0	1	0	0	0	5	0	—		26	0
Marseille	2019–20	Ligue 1	23	1	2	0	1	0	—		—		26	1
Marseille	2020–21	Ligue 1	33	2	1	0	—		4 (Note: Appearances in UEFA Champions League)	0	1 (Note: Appearance in Trophée des Champions)	0	39	2
Marseille	2021–22	Ligue 1	26	2	3	0	—		9 (Note: Three appearances in UEFA Europa League, six appearances in UEFA Europa Conference League)	0	—		38	2
Marseille	2022–23	Ligue 1	1	0	0	0	—		0	0	—		1	0
Marseille	Total		103	5	7	0	1	0	18	0	1	0	130	5
Southampton	2022–23	Premier League	13	1	2	1	4	0	—		—		19	2
Lyon (loan)	2023–24	Ligue 1	24	0	5	0	—		—		—		29	0
Lyon	2024–25	Ligue 1	19	1	0	0	—		9	0	—		28	1
Lyon	2026–27	Ligue 1	0	0	0	0	—		0	0	—		0	0
Lyon	Lyon total		43	1	5	0	—		9	0	—		57	1
Real Sociedad (loan)	2025–26	La Liga	26	1	5	0	—		—		—		31	1
Sassuolo	2026–27	Serie A	7	0	0	0	—		—		—		7	0
Career total			328	15	35	1	5	0	57	0	1	0	426	16

=== International ===
As of match played 15 November 2026

Appearances and goals by national team and year
National team	Year	Apps	Goals
Croatia	2018	2	0
Croatia	2019	3	0
Croatia	2020	5	0
Croatia	2021	10	1
Croatia	2022	3	0
Croatia	2023	0	0
Croatia	2024	6	0
Croatia	2025	8	0
Croatia	2026	2	0
Total		39	1

As of match played 31 March 2026
Scores and results list Croatia's goal tally first, score column indicates score after each Ćaleta-Car goal.

List of international goals scored by Duje Ćaleta-Car
No.	Date	Venue	Cap	Opponent	Score	Result	Competition
1	11 November 2021	National Stadium, Ta' Qali, Malta	20	Malta	2–0	7–1	2022 FIFA World Cup qualification

== Honours ==
Red Bull Salzburg

- Austrian Bundesliga: 2014–15, 2015–16, 2016–17, 2017–18
- Austrian Cup: 2014–15, 2015–16, 2016–17

Lyon

- Coupe de France runner-up: 2023–24

Real Sociedad

- Copa del Rey: 2025–26

Croatia

- FIFA World Cup runner-up: 2018

Individual

- Austrian Bundesliga Team of the Year: 2017–18

Orders

- Order of Duke Branimir: 2018
