= Ismaël Camara =

Guinean footballer (born 2000)

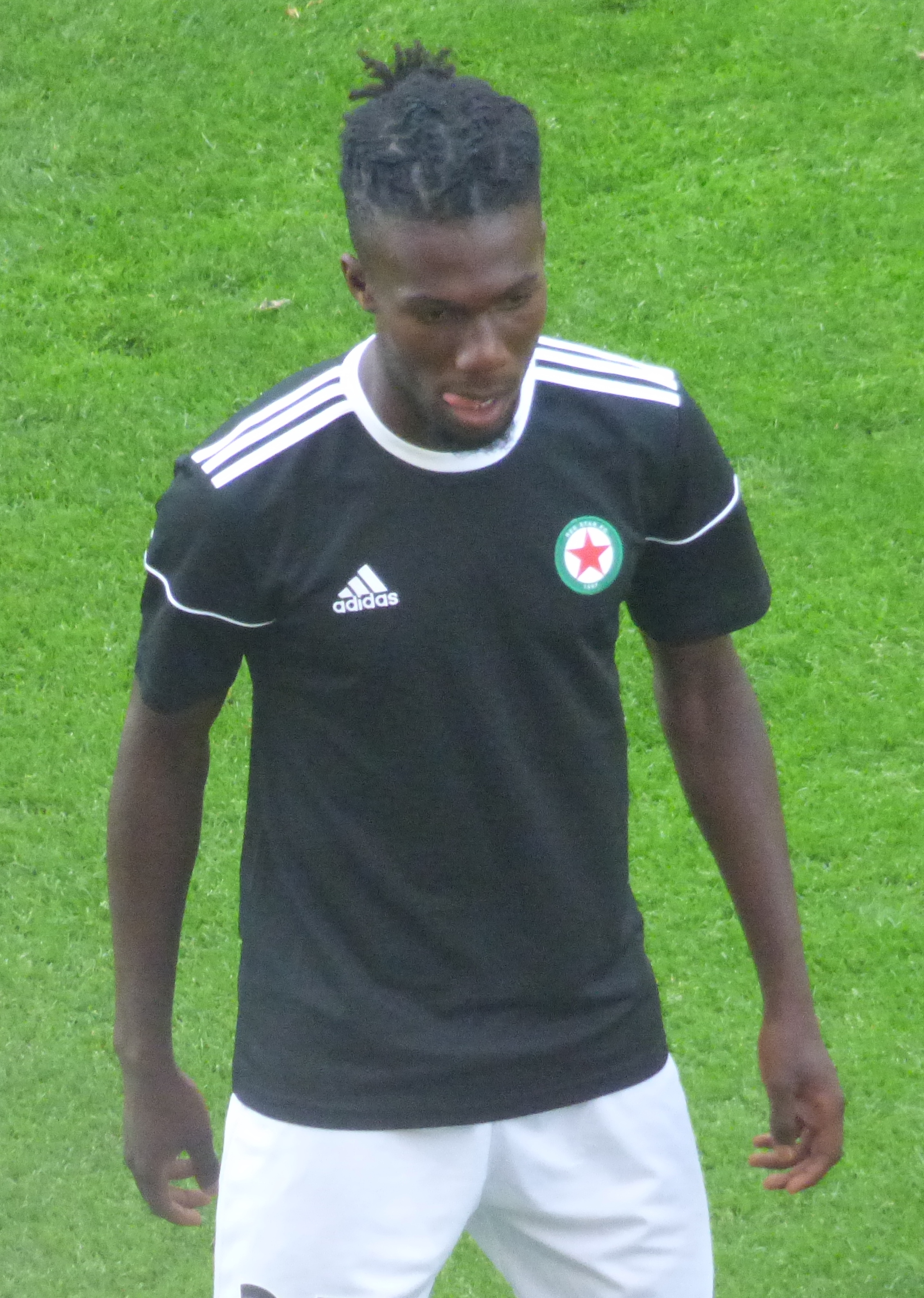
- Camara with Red Star in 2018

Personal information
- Date of birth: 11 November 2000 (age 26)
- Place of birth: Guinea
- Height: 1.78 m (5 ft 10 in)
- Position: Forward

Team information
- Current team: FC 93
- Number: 11

Youth career
- 2011–2016: Angoulême

Senior career*
Years	Team	Apps	(Gls)
2017–2020	Red Star	10	(1)
2020–2021	Gazélec Ajaccio	2	(0)
2021–2024	Épinal	64	(15)
2024–2025	Nîmes	44	(4)
2025–	FC 93	2	(0)
- * Club domestic league appearances and goals as of 06:05, 11 September 2025 (UTC)

Ismaël Camara (born 11 November 2000) is a Guinean professional footballer who plays as a forward for Championnat National 1 club FC 93.

== Career ==
Camara came through the youth ranks of Angoulême, securing a move to Red Star in 2017. He made his first team debut for the club as a stoppage time substitute in the Championnat National game against Cholet on 11 August 2017. He scored his first league goal for the club on 26 April 2019, in the Ligue 2 game against Metz.

In October 2019, Camara was hospitalised after contracting Malaria whilst with the Guinea under-23 squad. He was initially put into an induced coma, but was released from hospital later the same month. His team-mates paid homage to him before their match against Avranches on 4 October, and dedicated the win to him.

== Personal life ==
Camara was born in Guinea, and moved to France at the age of 9.
