= La Commanderie =

Training ground of Olympique de Marseille

Centre d'Entraînement Robert Louis-Dreyfus
- La Commanderie
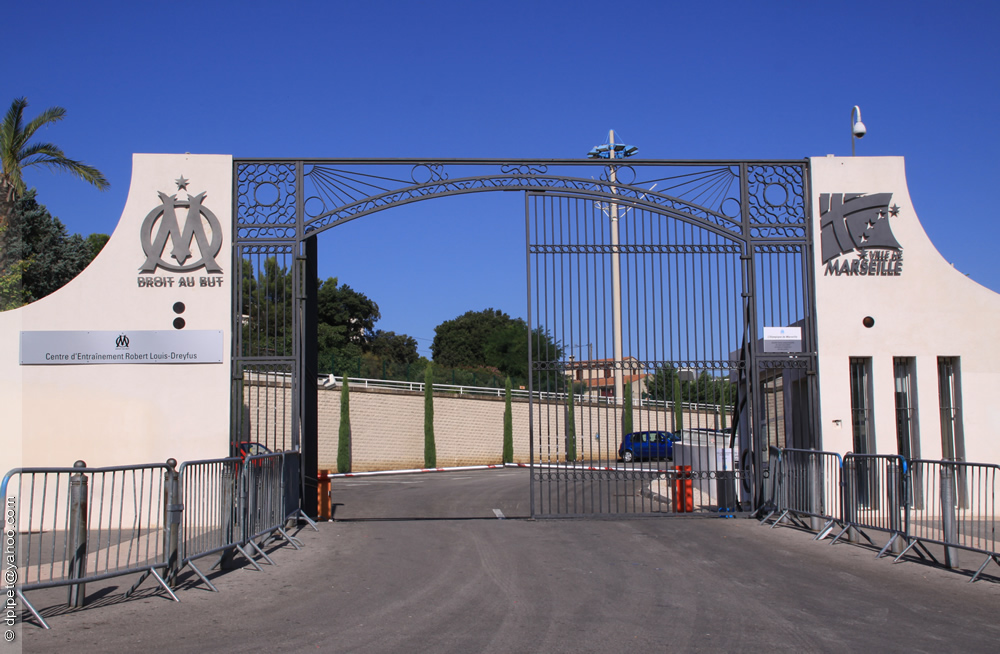
- Entrance of the centre
- Interactive map of Centre d'Entraînement Robert Louis-Dreyfus
- Former names: La Commanderie
- Location: Marseille
- Coordinates: 43°18′5″N 5°27′43″E
- Type: Sports facility

Construction
- Opened: 1991
- Renovated: 2002 and 2009

Tenant
- Olympique de Marseille

The Centre d'Entraînement Robert Louis-Dreyfus, commonly referred to as La Commanderie, is the training ground and academy base of French football club Olympique de Marseille. Located in Marseille, the ground was officially opened in July 1991. The training ground was renamed in 2009 after the death of the owner of the club, Robert Louis-Dreyfus.
