= 2021–22 Olympique de Marseille season =

Olympique de Marseille
2021–22 season
- President: Pablo Longoria
- Head coach: Jorge Sampaoli
- Stadium: Stade Vélodrome
- Ligue 1: 2nd
- Coupe de France: Quarter-finals
- UEFA Europa League: Group stage
- UEFA Europa Conference League: Semi-finals
- Top goalscorer: League: Dimitri Payet (12); All: Arkadiusz Milik (20)
- Highest home attendance: 65,121 (vs Paris Saint-Germain, 24 October 2021, Ligue 1)
- Biggest win: 5–2 (vs. Angers (H), 4 February 2022, Ligue 1)
- Biggest defeat: 4–1 (vs. Nice (A), 9 February 2022, Coupe de France)
Home colours	Away colours	Third colours

The 2021–22 season was the 116th season in the existence of Olympique de Marseille and the club's 26th consecutive season in the top flight of French football. In addition to the domestic league, Marseille participated in this season's editions of the Coupe de France, the UEFA Europa League and the UEFA Europa Conference League.

== Players ==
=== First-team squad ===
As of 18 January 2022

Note: Flags indicate national team as defined under FIFA eligibility rules; some limited exceptions apply. Players may hold more than one non-FIFA nationality.

No.	Pos.	Nation	Player
1	GK	FRA	Simon Ngapandouetnbu
2	DF	FRA	William Saliba (on loan from Arsenal)
3	DF	ESP	Álvaro González (3rd captain)
4	MF	FRA	Boubacar Kamara (4th captain)
5	DF	ARG	Leonardo Balerdi
6	MF	FRA	Matteo Guendouzi (on loan from Arsenal)
7	MF	MAR	Amine Harit (on loan from Schalke 04)
8	MF	BRA	Gerson
9	FW	POL	Arkadiusz Milik (on loan from Napoli)
10	FW	FRA	Dimitri Payet (vice-captain)
11	FW	BRA	Luis Henrique
12	FW	SEN	Bamba Dieng
13	FW	COD	Cédric Bakambu

No.	Pos.	Nation	Player
14	DF	BRA	Luan Peres
15	DF	CRO	Duje Ćaleta-Car
16	GK	ESP	Pau López (on loan from Roma)
17	FW	TUR	Cengiz Ünder (on loan from Roma)
20	FW	USA	Konrad de la Fuente
21	MF	FRA	Valentin Rongier
22	MF	SEN	Pape Gueye
23	DF	BIH	Sead Kolašinac
26	MF	MAR	Oussama Targhalline
29	DF	ESP	Pol Lirola
30	GK	FRA	Steve Mandanda (captain)
32	FW	FRA	Salim Ben Seghir

=== Out on loan ===
Note: Flags indicate national team as defined under FIFA eligibility rules; some limited exceptions apply. Players may hold more than one non-FIFA nationality.

No.	Pos.	Nation	Player
—	DF	FRA	Jordan Amavi (on loan to Nice)
—	DF	FRA	Lucas Perrin (on loan to Strasbourg)
—	DF	FRA	Richecard Richard (on loan to Créteil)
—	MF	FRA	Nassim Ahmed (on loan to Sète)
—	MF	FRA	Alexandre Phliponeau (on loan to Sète)

No.	Pos.	Nation	Player
—	MF	SRB	Nemanja Radonjić (on loan to Benfica)
—	MF	NED	Kevin Strootman (on loan to Cagliari)
—	FW	ARG	Darío Benedetto (on loan to Elche)
—	FW	ESP	Pedro Ruiz (on loan to NEC)

== Transfers ==
=== In ===
No.	Pos	Player	Transferred from	Fee	Date	Source
32	FW	Salim Ben Seghir (FRA)	Nice (FRA)	Free	1 July 2021	
20	FW	Konrad de la Fuente (USA)	Barcelona (ESP)	€3,000,000	1 July 2021	
5	DF	Leonardo Balerdi (ARG)	Borussia Dortmund (GER)	€11,000,000	3 July 2021	
17	FW	Cengiz Ünder (TUR)	Roma (ITA)	Loan	4 July 2021	
6	MF	Matteo Guendouzi (FRA)	Arsenal (ENG)	Loan	6 July 2021	
16	GK	Pau López (ESP)	Roma (ITA)	Loan	8 July 2021	
8	MF	Gerson (BRA)	Flamengo (BRA)	€25,000,000	9 July 2021	
14	DF	Luan Peres (BRA)	Santos (BRA)	€4,500,000	14 July 2021	
2	DF	William Saliba (FRA)	Arsenal (ENG)	Loan	15 July 2021	
29	DF	Pol Lirola (ESP)	Fiorentina (ITA)	€13,000,000	24 August 2021	
7	MF	Amine Harit (MAR)	Schalke 04 (GER)	Loan	2 September 2021	
13	FW	Cédric Bakambu (COD)	Free transfer		13 January 2022	
23	DF	Sead Kolašinac (BIH)	Arsenal (ENG)	Free	18 January 2022	
–	FW	Darío Benedetto (ARG)	Elche (ESP)	Loan return	22 January 2022	

=== Out ===
No.	Pos	Player	Transferred to	Fee	Date	Source
16	GK	Yohann Pelé (FRA)	Free transfer		1 July 2021	
25	DF	Yuto Nagatomo (JPN)	Free transfer		1 July 2021	
28	FW	Valère Germain (FRA)	Free transfer		1 July 2021	
–	MF	Maxime Lopez (FRA)	Sassuolo (ITA)	€2,000,000	1 July 2021	
2	DF	Hiroki Sakai (JPN)	Urawa Red Diamonds (JPN)	€1,500,000	1 July 2021	
–	MF	Kevin Strootman (NED)	Cagliari (ITA)	Loan	3 July 2021	
24	MF	Saîf-Eddine Khaoui (TUN)	Clermont (FRA)	Free	14 August 2021	
9	FW	Darío Benedetto (ARG)	Elche (ESP)	Loan	19 August 2021	
7	MF	Nemanja Radonjić (SRB)	Benfica (POR)	Loan	22 August 2021	
23	DF	Jordan Amavi (FRA)	Nice (FRA)	Loan	5 January 2022	
–	FW	Darío Benedetto (ARG)	Boca Juniors (ARG)	€3,000,000	22 January 2022	

== Pre-season and friendlies ==
Win Draw Loss

4 July 2021 Friendly	Marseille	3–0	Martigues	Marseille, France
18:00 CEST (UTC+2)	Kamara 37'; Benedetto 51'; Gebreyesus 74'	Report		Stadium: Robert Louis-Dreyfus Center
Note: Three halves of 30 minutes played.

11 July 2021 Friendly	Marseille	2–1	Sète	Marseille, France
18:00 CEST (UTC+2)	Dieng 15'; Payet 41' (pen.)	Report	N'Gom 23'	Stadium: Robert Louis-Dreyfus Center
Note: Three halves of 30 minutes played.

15 July 2021 Friendly	Marseille	3–1	Servette	Fos-sur-Mer, France
21:00 CEST (UTC+2)	Gerson 54'; Benedetto 80', 90+2'	Report	Rodelin 77'	Stadium: Stade Parsemain; Attendance: 3,671

21 July 2021 Friendly	Braga	1–1	Marseille	Braga, Portugal
20:00 WEST (UTC+1)	Ruiz 19'	Report	Payet 52'	Stadium: Estádio Municipal de Braga; Attendance: 0

25 July 2021 Friendly	Benfica	1–1	Marseille	Lisbon, Portugal
20:00 WEST (UTC+1)	Pizzi 14' (pen.); Taarabt (yellow card) 42'; Weigl (yellow card) 85'; João Mário (yellow card) 86'	Report	Peres (yellow card) 13'; Payet 38'; Gueye (yellow card) 43'	Stadium: Estádio da Luz; Attendance: 0 Referee: Luís Godinho

28 July 2021 Friendly	Saint-Étienne	1–2	Marseille	Gueugnon, France
21:00 CEST (UTC+2)	Khazri 20', (yellow card) 24'; Gabard (yellow card) 72'	Report	De la Fuente 2'; Payet (yellow card) 37'; Guendouzi (yellow card) 62'; Álvaro 87'	Stadium: Stade Jean Laville; Attendance: 7,000

31 July 2021 Friendly	Marseille	2–1	Villarreal	Marseille, France
21:00 CEST (UTC+2)	Niño 9' (o.g.); Balerdi (yellow card) 52'; Payet 58'; Gueye (yellow card) 68'	Report	Foyth (yellow card) 45' (yellow-red card) 49'; Moreno 88'	Stadium: Stade Vélodrome; Attendance: 30,000; Referee: Pierre Gaillouste

== Competitions ==
=== Overall record ===
Competition	First match	Last match	Starting round	Final position	Record							
Competition	First match	Last match	Starting round	Final position	Pld	W	D	L	GF	GA	GD	Win %
Ligue 1	8 August 2021	21 May 2022	Matchday 1	2nd	38	21	8	9	63	38	+25	55.26
Coupe de France	19 December 2021	9 February 2022	Round of 64	Quarter-finals	4	2	1	1	9	6	+3	50.00
UEFA Europa League	16 September 2021	9 December 2021	Group stage	Group stage	6	1	4	1	6	7	−1	16.67
UEFA Europa Conference League	17 February 2022	5 May 2022	Knockout round play-offs	Semi-finals	8	6	1	1	15	7	+8	75.00
Total					56	30	14	12	93	58	+35	53.57

Source: Soccerway

=== Ligue 1 ===
==== League table ====
Pos	Team	Pld	W	D	L	GF	GA	GD	Pts	Qualification or relegation
1	Paris Saint-Germain (C)	38	26	8	4	90	36	+54	86	Qualification for the Champions League group stage
2	Marseille	38	21	8	9	63	38	+25	71	Qualification for the Champions League group stage
3	Monaco	38	20	9	9	65	40	+25	69	Qualification for the Champions League third qualifying round
4	Rennes	38	20	6	12	82	40	+42	66	Qualification for the Europa League group stage
5	Nice	38	20	7	11	52	36	+16	66 (Note: Nice were deducted one point for uncontrolled crowd trouble that caused the abandonment of their match against Marseille.)	Qualification for the Europa Conference League play-off round

Source: Ligue 1
Rules for classification: 1) Points; 2) Goal difference; 3) Head-to-head points; 4) Head-to-head goal difference; 5) Head-to-head goals scored; 6) Head-to-head away goals scored; 7) Goals scored; 8) Away goals scored; 9) Fair-play points (Note: Head-to-head record is used only after all the matches between the teams in question have been played).
(C) Champions

==== Results summary ====
Overall								Home						Away					
Pld	W	D	L	GF	GA	GD	Pts	W	D	L	GF	GA	GD	W	D	L	GF	GA	GD
38	21	8	9	63	38	+25	71	9	5	5	33	22	+11	12	3	4	30	16	+14

Source: Ligue 1

==== Results by round ====
Round	1	2	3	4	5	6	7	8	9	10	11	12	13	14	15	16	17	18	19	20	21	22	23	24	25	26	27	28	29	30	31	32	33	34	35	36	37	38
Ground	A	H	A	H	A	H	A	H	A	H	H	A	H	A	H	A	H	A	H	A	H	A	H	A	H	A	H	A	H	A	H	A	H	A	H	A	A	H
Result	W	D	D	W	W	W	D	L	L	W	D	W	D	L	W	W	L	W	D	W	D	W	W	W	L	D	L	W	W	W	W	L	W	W	L	W	L	W
Position	3	6	7	4	3	2	2	3	5	3	4	3	4	5	4	2	3	2	3	3	3	3	2	2	2	2	3	2	2	2	2	2	2	2	2	2	3	2

Source: Ligue 1
A = Away; H = Home; W = Win; D = Draw; L = Loss

==== Matches ====
The league fixtures were announced on 25 June 2021.

8 August 2021 1	Montpellier	2–3	Marseille	Montpellier
20:45 CEST (UTC+2)	Peres 30' (o.g.); Laborde 34'	Report	Peres (yellow card) 43'; Ünder 68'; Payet 75', 80'	Stadium: Stade de la Mosson; Attendance: 13,459; Referee: Jérémie Pignard

15 August 2021 2	Marseille	2–2	Bordeaux	Marseille
20:45 CEST (UTC+2)	Ünder 34'; Payet 41'; Balerdi (yellow card) 73', (red card) 88'; Saliba (yellow card) 90+3'	Report	Kwateng (yellow card) 30'; Pembélé 51'; Oudin 57'; Otávio (yellow card) 84'	Stadium: Stade Vélodrome; Attendance: 50,000; Referee: Ruddy Buquet

28 August 2021 4	Marseille	3–1	Saint-Étienne	Marseille
21:00 CEST (UTC+2)	Guendouzi 23'; Gerson 51'; Ünder 68'; Gueye (yellow card) 87'	Report	Kolodziejczak 32'; Khazri (yellow card) 42'; Maçon (yellow card) 49'; Camara (yellow card) 61'	Stadium: Stade Vélodrome; Attendance: 55,039; Referee: Benoît Millot

11 September 2021 5	Monaco	0–2	Marseille	Monaco
21:00 CEST (UTC+2)	Diop (yellow card) 23'; Tchouaméni (yellow card) 49'; Aguilar (yellow card) 57'; Fofana (yellow card) 82'	Report	Kamara (yellow card) 16'; Dieng 37', 60'	Stadium: Stade Louis II; Attendance: 8,615; Referee: Stéphanie Frappart

19 September 2021 6	Marseille	2–0	Rennes	Marseille
17:00 CEST (UTC+2)	Dieng 48'; Harit 71'	Report	Badé (yellow card) 44'; Santamaria (yellow card) 64'	Stadium: Stade Vélodrome; Attendance: 54,188; Referee: Willy Delajod

22 September 2021 7	Angers	0–0	Marseille	Angers
21:00 CEST (UTC+2)	Ounahi (yellow card) 44'	Report	Ćaleta-Car (yellow card) 52'; Balerdi (yellow card) 59'; Harit (yellow card) 65'	Stadium: Stade Raymond Kopa; Attendance: 12,458; Referee: Ruddy Buquet

26 September 2021 8	Marseille	2–3	Lens	Marseille
20:45 CEST (UTC+2)	Gueye (yellow card) 6'; Guendouzi (yellow card) 7'; Payet 33', 45+3' (pen.)	Report	Sotoca 9' (pen.); Frankowski 27'; Saïd 71', (yellow card) 90+3'	Stadium: Stade Vélodrome; Attendance: 50,001; Referee: Mikael Lesage

3 October 2021 9	Lille	2–0	Marseille	Villeneuve-d'Ascq
17:00 CEST (UTC+2)	Mandava (yellow card) 11'; David 28', 90+5'; Yılmaz (yellow card) 66'	Report	Ünder (yellow card) 24' (yellow-red card) 77'; Balerdi (yellow card) 37'	Stadium: Stade Pierre-Mauroy; Attendance: 44,839; Referee: Jérémie Pignard

17 October 2021 10	Marseille	4–1	Lorient	Marseille
20:45 CEST (UTC+2)	Kamara 27'; Guendouzi 56'; Milik 85'; Mendes 90+2' (o.g.)	Report	Laurienté 13' (pen.), (yellow card) 81'	Stadium: Stade Vélodrome; Attendance: 57,349; Referee: Antony Gautier

24 October 2021 11	Marseille	0–0	Paris Saint-Germain	Marseille
20:45 CEST (UTC+2)	Rongier (yellow card) 18'	Report	Hakimi (red card) 57'; Pereira (yellow card) 85'; Marquinhos (yellow card) 85'	Stadium: Stade Vélodrome; Attendance: 65,121; Referee: Benoît Bastien

27 October 2021 3	Nice	1–1	Marseille	Troyes
21:00 CEST (UTC+2)	Gouiri 6'; Guessand (yellow card) 31'; Todibo (yellow card) 90+2'	Report	Payet 42'; López (yellow card) 90+1'; Kamara (yellow card) 90+3'	Stadium: Stade de l'Aube; Attendance: 0 Referee: Clément Turpin
Note: The match was originally played on 22 August 2021 at the Allianz Riviera, but was abandoned after 74 minutes, with Nice leading 1–0, due to crowd disturbances caused by Nice fans. Nice were thus deducted one point and a replay was rescheduled for 27 October, to be played at a neutral venue behind closed doors.

31 October 2021 12	Clermont	0–1	Marseille	Clermont-Ferrand
20:45 CET (UTC+1)	Khaoui (yellow card) 53'	Report	Guendouzi (yellow card) 24'; Ünder 25'; Saliba (yellow card) 40'; Balerdi (yellow card) 40'; De la Fuente (yellow card) 56'	Stadium: Stade Gabriel Montpied; Attendance: 12,240; Referee: Benoît Millot

7 November 2021 13	Marseille	0–0	Metz	Marseille
13:00 CET (UTC+1)	Ćaleta-Car (yellow card) 70'	Report	N'Doram (yellow card) 12'; Kouyaté (yellow card) 35'; Jemerson (red card) 55'; Oukidja (yellow card) 90+8'	Stadium: Stade Vélodrome; Attendance: 61,539; Referee: Jérôme Brisard

28 November 2021 15	Marseille	1–0	Troyes	Marseille
20:45 CET (UTC+1)	Gueye (yellow card) 16'; Lirola 74'	Report	Salmier (yellow card) 10'; Tardieu (yellow card) 17'; Koné (yellow card) 43'; Rodrigues (yellow card) 59'	Stadium: Stade Vélodrome; Attendance: 0 Referee: Jérémie Pignard
Note: Match played behind closed doors.

1 December 2021 16	Nantes	0–1	Marseille	Nantes
21:00 CET (UTC+1)	Pallois (yellow card) 14' (yellow-red card) 32'; Lafont (yellow card) 78'	Report	Gerson 30', (yellow card) 71'; Álvaro (yellow card) 78'	Stadium: Stade de la Beaujoire; Attendance: 34,018; Referee: Eric Wattellier

4 December 2021 17	Marseille	1–2	Brest	Marseille
17:00 CET (UTC+1)	Gerson 28'; Kamara (yellow card) 61'	Report	Faivre 53' (pen.); Honorat 70'; Pierre-Gabriel (yellow card) 90+2'; Cardona (yellow card) 90+3'	Stadium: Stade Vélodrome; Attendance: 54,413; Referee: Antony Gautier

12 December 2021 18	Strasbourg	0–2	Marseille	Strasbourg
17:00 CET (UTC+1)	Ajorque (yellow card) 49'; Nyamsi (yellow card) 71'	Report	Dieng 62'; Guendouzi (yellow card) 68'; Ćaleta-Car 82'	Stadium: Stade de la Meinau; Attendance: 26,028; Referee: Mikael Lesage

22 December 2021 19	Marseille	1–1	Reims	Marseille
21:00 CET (UTC+1)	Rongier (yellow card) 28'; Gerson (yellow card) 44'; Dieng (red card) 85'; Payet (yellow card) 85', (goal) 90+7' (pen.); Kamara (yellow card) 90+8'	Report	Ekitike 75'; Cassamá (yellow card) 81'; Abdelhamid (yellow card) 90+3'; Gravillon (yellow card) 90+6' (yellow-red card) 90+7'	Stadium: Stade Vélodrome; Attendance: 55,908; Referee: François Letexier

7 January 2022 20	Bordeaux	0–1	Marseille	Bordeaux
21:00 CET (UTC+1)	Sissokho (yellow card) 13'	Report	Ünder 37'; López (yellow card) 90'	Stadium: Matmut Atlantique; Attendance: 0 Referee: Eric Wattellier

16 January 2022 21	Marseille	1–1	Lille	Marseille
20:45 CET (UTC+1)	Guendouzi (yellow card) 4'; Ünder 75'	Report	Botman 15'; André (yellow card) 30' (yellow-red card) 32'; Grbić (yellow card) 55'; Çelik (yellow card) 55'; Lihadji (yellow card) 86'	Stadium: Stade Vélodrome; Attendance: 5,034; Referee: Amaury Delerue

22 January 2022 22	Lens	0–2	Marseille	Lens
21:00 CET (UTC+1)	Danso (yellow card) 20'; Medina (yellow card) 32'; Sotoca (yellow card) 49'	Report	Payet 34' (pen.); Peres (yellow card) 71'; Bakambu 77'; Lirola (yellow card) 86'	Stadium: Stade Félix-Bollaert; Attendance: 5,000; Referee: Stéphanie Frappart

1 February 2022 14	Lyon	2–1	Marseille	Décines-Charpieu
21:00 CET (UTC+1)	Shaqiri 76'; Dembélé 89'	Report	Guendouzi 10'	Stadium: Groupama Stadium; Attendance: 0 Referee: Benoît Bastien
Note: The match was originally played on 21 November 2021 at the Groupama Stadium, but was abandoned after five minutes, with the score at 0–0, due to Dimitri Payet being hit by a bottle.

4 February 2022 23	Marseille	5–2	Angers	Marseille
21:00 CET (UTC+1)	Milik 18', 70', 78'; Gerson 21'; Ünder 84'	Report	Fulgini 8'; Bentaleb 11', (yellow card) 90'; Cabot (yellow card) 53'; Mendy (yellow card) 76'	Stadium: Stade Vélodrome; Attendance: 60,000; Referee: Jérémy Stinat

13 February 2022 24	Metz	1–2	Marseille	Metz
20:45 CET (UTC+1)	Pajot (yellow card) 19'; Traoré (yellow card) 45+1'; Maïga 52'	Report	Bakambu 26', (yellow card) 71'; Milik 82'; Payet (yellow card) 88'	Stadium: Stade Saint-Symphorien; Attendance: 25,482; Referee: Eric Wattellier

20 February 2022 25	Marseille	0–2	Clermont	Marseille
20:45 CET (UTC+1)	Guendouzi (yellow card) 68'; Ćaleta-Car (yellow card) 75'	Report	Bayo 13'; Seidu (yellow card) 68'; Allevinah 84'; Kyei (yellow card) 88'	Stadium: Stade Vélodrome; Attendance: 53,840; Referee: Willy Delajod

27 February 2022 26	Troyes	1–1	Marseille	Troyes
17:05 CET (UTC+1)	Baldé (yellow card) 27'; Tardieu (yellow card) 36'; Rami (yellow card) 36'; Conté (yellow card) 49'; Touzghar 90'; Biancone (yellow card) 90+6'	Report	Rongier (yellow card) 11'; Payet 28' (pen.), (yellow card) 55'; López (yellow card) 86'	Stadium: Stade de l'Aube; Attendance: 16,871; Referee: François Letexier

6 March 2022 27	Marseille	0–1	Monaco	Marseille
20:45 CET (UTC+1)	Peres (yellow card) 53'; Kamara (yellow card) 90+1'	Report	Disasi (yellow card) 56'; Martins 59'	Stadium: Stade Vélodrome; Attendance: 56,510; Referee: Antony Gautier

13 March 2022 28	Brest	1–4	Marseille	Brest
20:45 CET (UTC+1)	Satriano (yellow card) 35'; Cardona 90+1'	Report	Gerson 3'; Guendouzi (yellow card) 33'; Milik 63'; Harit 71'; Saliba (yellow card) 77'; Gueye (yellow card) 89'; Peres (yellow card) 90'; Ünder 90+1'	Stadium: Stade Francis-Le Blé; Attendance: 14,611; Referee: Ruddy Buquet

20 March 2022 29	Marseille	2–1	Nice	Marseille
20:45 CET (UTC+1)	Milik 45+3' (pen.); Ćaleta-Car (yellow card) 60'; Bakambu 89'; Saliba (yellow card) 90+1'	Report	Bard (yellow card) 45'; Lemina 90+2'	Stadium: Stade Vélodrome; Attendance: 64,722; Referee: Jérôme Brisard

3 April 2022 30	Saint-Étienne	2–4	Marseille	Saint-Étienne
15:00 CEST (UTC+2)	Bouanga 9'; Mangala (yellow card) 45+1'; Thioub (yellow card) 77'; Gourna-Douath 86'	Report	Payet 45+1' (pen.); Kolodziejczak 60' (o.g.); Dieng 68' (pen.); Harit 73'; Targhalline (yellow card) 88'	Stadium: Stade Geoffroy-Guichard; Attendance: 41,278; Referee: Clément Turpin
Note: The match was originally scheduled for 2 April 2022, but was postponed due to adverse weather conditions.

10 April 2022 31	Marseille	2–0	Montpellier	Marseille
21:00 CEST (UTC+2)	Dieng 9'; Ünder 19' (pen.)	Report	Ferri (yellow card) 18'; Leroy (yellow card) 66'; Omlin (red card) 90'	Stadium: Stade Vélodrome; Attendance: 51,131; Referee: Jérémy Stinat

17 April 2022 32	Paris Saint-Germain	2–1	Marseille	Paris
20:45 CEST (UTC+2)	Neymar 12', (yellow card) 55'; Verratti (yellow card) 17'; Mendes (yellow card) 37'; Mbappé 45+4' (pen.), (yellow card) 90+1'; Gueye (yellow card) 46'; Donnarumma (yellow card) 90+2'	Report	Gerson (yellow card) 21'; Ćaleta-Car 31'	Stadium: Parc des Princes; Attendance: 46,000; Referee: François Letexier

20 April 2022 33	Marseille	3–2	Nantes	Marseille
21:00 CEST (UTC+2)	Peres (yellow card) 35'; Payet 39' (pen.), 55' (pen.); Harit 75'; Milik (yellow card) 87'	Report	Girotto 26'; Blas (yellow card) 32'; Coco 41', (yellow card) 45+1' (yellow-red card) 90+3'; Fábio (yellow card) 81'; Appiah (yellow card) 90+1'	Stadium: Stade Vélodrome; Attendance: 55,890; Referee: Ruddy Buquet

24 April 2022 34	Reims	0–1	Marseille	Reims
20:45 CEST (UTC+2)	Locko (yellow card) 28'	Report	Peres (yellow card) 5'; Gerson 83'	Stadium: Stade Auguste-Delaune; Attendance: 20,335; Referee: Jérôme Brisard

1 May 2022 35	Marseille	0–3	Lyon	Marseille
20:45 CEST (UTC+2)	López (yellow card) 57'; Gueye (yellow card) 71'	Report	Lukeba 55'; Dembélé (yellow card) 60', (goal) 76'; Toko Ekambi 89'	Stadium: Stade Vélodrome; Attendance: 64,784; Referee: Antony Gautier

8 May 2022 36	Lorient	0–3	Marseille	Lorient
17:05 CEST (UTC+2)	Lemoine (yellow card) 56'	Report	Dieng 39'; Guendouzi 48'; Saliba (yellow card) 65'; Gerson 67'	Stadium: Stade du Moustoir; Attendance: 16,210; Referee: Bastien Dechepy

14 May 2022 37	Rennes	2–0	Marseille	Rennes
21:00 CEST (UTC+2)	Bourigeaud 12'; Tait (yellow card) 27'; Majer 35'	Report	Ćaleta-Car (yellow card) 64'; Gueye (yellow card) 70'	Stadium: Roazhon Park; Attendance: 28,811; Referee: Benoît Bastien

21 May 2022 38	Marseille	4–0	Strasbourg	Marseille
21:00 CEST (UTC+2)	Gerson 32', 89'; Ćaleta-Car (yellow card) 34'; Ünder 73'; Gueye (yellow card) 86'; Bakambu 90+2'	Report	Sissoko (yellow card) 75'	Stadium: Stade Vélodrome; Attendance: 63,873; Referee: Stéphanie Frappart

=== Coupe de France ===
19 December 2021 Round of 64	Marseille	4–1	Cannet-Rocheville	Marseille (Note: Tie reversed after ES Cannet Rocheville were unable to provide a stadium. Requests to play in Cannes were rejected due to security concerns.)
13:45 CET (UTC+1)	Álvaro (yellow card) 23'; Milik 41' (pen.), 58', 90'; Henrique 77'	Report	Core 16'; Lahouel (yellow card) 22' (yellow-red card) 39'; Tahtouh (yellow card) 29'	Stadium: Stade Vélodrome; Attendance: 21,538; Referee: Johan Hamel

2 January 2022 Round of 32	Chauvigny	0–3	Marseille	Limoges
21:00 CET (UTC+1)		Report	Milik 29'; Ünder 41'; Harit 80'	Stadium: Stade Municipal de Beaublanc; Attendance: 8,000; Referee: Jérôme Brisard

29 January 2022 Round of 16	Marseille	1–1 (5–4 p)	Montpellier	Marseille
21:00 CET (UTC+1)	Milik 74'; Kamara (yellow card) 90+1'	Report	Makouana 80'	Stadium: Stade Vélodrome; Attendance: 5,000; Referee: Benoît Millot
	Penalties
	Rongier (penalty scored); Milik (penalty scored); Ünder (penalty scored); Guendouzi (penalty scored); Payet (penalty scored)		(penalty scored) Sakho; (penalty missed) Ristić; (penalty scored) Leroy; (penalty scored) Delaye; (penalty scored) Chotard

9 February 2022 Quarter-finals	Nice	4–1	Marseille	Nice
21:15 CET (UTC+1)	Gouiri 10'; Kluivert 29', 49', (yellow card) 32'; Delort 61'; Daniliuc (yellow card) 90'	Report	Bard 3' (o.g.); Balerdi (yellow card) 40'	Stadium: Allianz Riviera; Attendance: 33,346; Referee: Ruddy Buquet

=== UEFA Europa League ===
==== Group stage ====
The draw for the group stage was held on 27 August 2021.

Pos	Team	Pld	W	D	L	GF	GA	GD	Pts	Qualification	GAL	LAZ	MAR	LOK
1	(Turkey) Galatasaray	6	3	3	0	7	3	+4	12	Advance to round of 16	—	1–0	4–2	1–1
2	(Italy) Lazio	6	2	3	1	7	3	+4	9	Advance to knockout round play-offs	0–0	—	0–0	2–0
3	(France) Marseille	6	1	4	1	6	7	−1	7	Transfer to Europa Conference League	0–0	2–2	—	1–0
4	(Russia) Lokomotiv Moscow	6	0	2	4	2	9	−7	2		0–1	0–3	1–1	—

Source: UEFA
Rules for classification: Group stage tiebreakers

16 September 2021 1	Lokomotiv Moscow (Russia)	1–1	(France) Marseille	Moscow, Russia
20:45 MSK (UTC+3)	Beka Beka (yellow card) 22'; Tiknizyan (yellow card) 33' (yellow-red card) 59'; Anjorin 89'	Report	Kamara (yellow card) 37'; Ünder 59' (pen.); Rongier (yellow card) 62'	Stadium: RZD Arena; Attendance: 8,100; Referee: Irfan Peljto (Bosnia and Herzegovina)

30 September 2021 2	Marseille (France)	0–0	(Turkey) Galatasaray	Marseille, France
21:00 CEST (UTC+2)	Saliba (yellow card) 90+5'; Álvaro (yellow card) 90+6'; Payet (yellow card) 90+10'	Report	Boey (yellow card) 53'; Muslera (yellow card) 90+4'; Diagne (yellow card) 90+5'	Stadium: Stade Vélodrome; Attendance: 49,870; Referee: Paweł Raczkowski (Poland)

21 October 2021 3	Lazio (Italy)	0–0	(France) Marseille	Rome, Italy
18:45 CEST (UTC+2)		Report	Payet (yellow card) 52'; Kamara (yellow card) 73'; Rongier (yellow card) 81'	Stadium: Stadio Olimpico; Attendance: 8,329; Referee: Deniz Aytekin (Germany)

4 November 2021 4	Marseille (France)	2–2	(Italy) Lazio	Marseille, France
21:00 CET (UTC+1)	Milik 33' (pen.); Rongier (yellow card) 79'; Payet 82', (yellow card) 90+4'; Harit (yellow card) 86'	Report	Acerbi (yellow card) 32'; Pedro (yellow card) 36'; Immobile (yellow card) 44', (goal) 49'; Felipe Anderson 45+7', (yellow card) 70'	Stadium: Stade Vélodrome; Attendance: 59,163; Referee: José María Sánchez Martínez (Spain)

25 November 2021 5	Galatasaray (Turkey)	4–2	(France) Marseille	Istanbul, Turkey
20:45 TRT (UTC+3)	Cicâldău 12', (yellow card) 36'; Ćaleta-Car 30' (o.g.); Feghouli 64'; Babel 83'; Moruțan (yellow card) 90+4'	Report	Gueye (yellow card) 37'; Dieng (yellow card) 45+1'; Peres (yellow card) 53'; Guendouzi (yellow card) 61'; Milik (penalty missed) 68', 69', 85', (yellow card) 89'; Gerson (yellow card) 90+6'	Stadium: Nef Stadium; Attendance: 39,758; Referee: Tobias Stieler (Germany)

9 December 2021 6	Marseille (France)	1–0	(Russia) Lokomotiv Moscow	Marseille, France
21:00 CET (UTC+1)	Gueye (yellow card) 18'; Milik 35'; Rongier (yellow card) 63' (yellow-red card) 80'	Report	Kamano (yellow card) 24'; Maradishvili (yellow card) 26'; Smolov (yellow card) 56'; Tiknizyan (yellow card) 87'	Stadium: Stade Vélodrome; Attendance: 42,614; Referee: Willie Collum (Scotland)

=== UEFA Europa Conference League ===
==== Knockout phase ====
===== Knockout round play-offs =====
The draw for the knockout round play-offs was held on 13 December 2021.

17 February 2022 First leg	Marseille (France)	3–1	(Azerbaijan) Qarabağ	Marseille, France
21:00 CET (UTC+1)	Ünder (yellow card) 36'; Milik 41', 44'; Peres (yellow card) 66'; Dieng (yellow card) 77'; Payet 90+2'	Report	Kady 85'	Stadium: Stade Vélodrome; Attendance: 25,713; Referee: Nikola Dabanović (Montenegro)

24 February 2022 Second leg	Qarabağ (Azerbaijan)	0–3 (1–6 agg.)	(France) Marseille	Baku, Azerbaijan
18:45 CET (UTC+1)	Ozobić (yellow card) 36'; Medina (yellow card) 48'; Kady (yellow card) 57'	Report	Gueye 12'; Álvaro (yellow card) 36'; Gueye (yellow card) 36'; Ćaleta-Car (yellow card) 43'; Bakambu (yellow card) 53'; Payet (yellow card) 73'; Guendouzi 77'; De la Fuente 90+2'	Stadium: Tofiq Bahramov Republican Stadium; Attendance: 27,783; Referee: Bartosz Frankowski (Poland)

===== Round of 16 =====
The round of 16 draw was held on 25 February 2022.

10 March 2022 First leg	Marseille (France)	2–1	(Switzerland) Basel	Marseille, France
21:00 CET (UTC+1)	Milik 19' (pen.), 68'; Payet (yellow card) 43'	Report	Esposito 80'; Burger (yellow card) 81'; Males (yellow card) 90+2'	Stadium: Stade Vélodrome; Attendance: 22,992; Referee: Irfan Peljto (Bosnia and Herzegovina)

17 March 2022 Second leg	Basel (Switzerland)	1–2 (2–4 agg.)	(France) Marseille	Basel, Switzerland
18:45 CET (UTC+1)	Chalov (yellow card) 26'; Burger (yellow card) 34'; Ndoye 63', (yellow card) 76'; Tavares (yellow card) 90+4'; Millar (yellow card) 90+5'	Report	Harit (penalty missed) 35'; Saliba (yellow card) 70'; Peres (yellow card) 70'; Ünder 74'; Mandanda (yellow card) 86'; Rongier 90+3'; Guendouzi (yellow card) 90+4'; Gerson (yellow card) 90+5'	Stadium: St. Jakob-Park; Attendance: 22,081; Referee: Artur Soares Dias (Portugal)

===== Quarter-finals =====
The draw for the quarter-finals was held on 18 March 2022.

7 April 2022 First leg	Marseille (France)	2–1	(Greece) PAOK	Marseille, France
21:00 CEST (UTC+2)	Gerson 13', (yellow card) 76' (yellow-red card) 90+4'; Payet 45'; Kamara (yellow card) 90'; Dieng (yellow card) 90+4'	Report	El Kaddouri 48'; Biseswar (yellow card) 73'; Kurtić (yellow card) 90+4'	Stadium: Stade Vélodrome; Attendance: 45,182; Referee: Szymon Marciniak (Poland)

14 April 2022 Second leg	PAOK (Greece)	0–1 (1–3 agg.)	(France) Marseille	Thessaloniki, Greece
22:00 EEST (UTC+3)	Douglas (yellow card) 65'; Schwab (yellow card) 90+3'	Report	Payet 34'	Stadium: Toumba Stadium; Attendance: 27,648; Referee: Danny Makkelie (Netherlands)

===== Semi-finals =====
The draw for the semi-finals was held on 18 March 2022, after the quarter-final draw.

28 April 2022 First leg	Feyenoord (Netherlands)	3–2	(France) Marseille	Rotterdam, Netherlands
21:00 CEST (UTC+2)	Dessers 18', 46'; Sinisterra 20'; Malacia (yellow card) 37'; Geertruida (yellow card) 79'; Hendrix (yellow card) 90+2'	Report	Dieng 28'; Gerson 40'; Harit (yellow card) 84'	Stadium: De Kuip; Attendance: 24,500; Referee: Michael Oliver (England)

5 May 2022 Second leg	Marseille (France)	0–0 (2–3 agg.)	(Netherlands) Feyenoord	Marseille, France
21:00 CEST (UTC+2)	Harit (yellow card) 45'; Kamara (yellow card) 71'; Ünder (yellow card) 84'; Guendouzi (yellow card) 90+6'	Report	Til (yellow card) 34'; Senesi (yellow card) 45+2'; Malacia (yellow card) 74'; Dessers (yellow card) 90+5'	Stadium: Stade Vélodrome; Attendance: 49,315; Referee: Sandro Schärer (Switzerland)

== Statistics ==
=== Appearances and goals ===
No.	Pos	Nat	Player	Total		Ligue 1		Coupe de France		UEFA Europa League		UEFA Europa Conference League	
No.	Pos	Nat	Player	Apps	Goals	Apps	Goals	Apps	Goals	Apps	Goals	Apps	Goals
Goalkeepers
1	GK	(France) FRA	Simon Ngapandouetnbu	0	0	0	0	0	0	0	0	0	0
16	GK	(Spain) ESP	Pau López	36	0	29	0	2	0	5	0	0	0
30	GK	(France) FRA	Steve Mandanda	20	0	9	0	2	0	1	0	8	0
Defenders
2	DF	(France) FRA	William Saliba	52	0	36	0	3	0	6	0	7	0
3	DF	(Spain) ESP	Álvaro	11	0	5+1	0	1+1	0	2	0	1	0
5	DF	(Argentina) ARG	Leonardo Balerdi	24	0	10+7	0	2+1	0	1+1	0	1+1	0
14	DF	(Brazil) BRA	Luan Peres	50	0	29+5	0	3	0	6	0	6+1	0
15	DF	(Croatia) CRO	Duje Ćaleta-Car	38	2	24+2	2	3	0	3	0	6	0
23	DF	(Bosnia and Herzegovina) BIH	Sead Kolašinac	17	0	6+8	0	0	0	0	0	2+1	0
29	DF	(Spain) ESP	Pol Lirola	51	1	19+15	1	2+2	0	4+2	0	4+3	0
Midfielders
4	MF	(France) FRA	Boubacar Kamara	48	1	31+3	1	2	0	4+1	0	5+2	0
6	MF	(France) FRA	Matteo Guendouzi	56	5	35+3	4	4	0	6	0	7+1	1
7	MF	(Morocco) MAR	Amine Harit	34	5	12+11	4	1+1	1	2+1	0	3+3	0
8	MF	(Brazil) BRA	Gerson	48	11	29+6	9	2+1	0	3+1	0	5+1	2
17	MF	(Turkey) TUR	Cengiz Ünder	47	13	25+7	10	3	1	5	1	4+3	1
21	MF	(France) FRA	Valentin Rongier	46	1	25+7	0	2+1	0	4	0	6+1	1
22	MF	(Senegal) SEN	Pape Gueye	42	1	17+11	0	1	0	3+3	0	6+1	1
34	MF	(France) FRA	Paolo Sciortino	0	0	0	0	0	0	0	0	0	0
35	MF	(Morocco) MAR	Oussama Targhalline	3	0	0+2	0	0+1	0	0	0	0	0
Forwards
9	FW	(Poland) POL	Arkadiusz Milik	37	20	15+8	7	3+1	5	4+1	4	2+3	4
10	FW	(France) FRA	Dimitri Payet	46	16	28+3	12	4	0	3+1	1	6+1	3
11	FW	(Brazil) BRA	Luis Henrique	25	1	7+13	0	2+1	1	0+2	0	0	0
12	FW	(Senegal) SEN	Bamba Dieng	36	8	11+14	7	0+1	0	3+2	0	2+3	1
13	FW	(Democratic Republic of the Congo) COD	Cédric Bakambu	21	4	5+7	4	0+2	0	0	0	5+2	0
20	FW	(United States) USA	Konrad de la Fuente	23	1	9+7	0	1	0	1+3	0	1+1	1
32	FW	(France) FRA	Salim Ben Seghir	1	0	0+1	0	0	0	0	0	0	0
Players transferred out during the season
7	FW	(Serbia) SRB	Nemanja Radonjić	4	0	0+1	0	0	0	2+1	0	0	0
9	FW	(Argentina) ARG	Darío Benedetto	2	0	0+2	0	0	0	0	0	0	0
23	DF	(France) FRA	Jordan Amavi	4	0	2	0	1+1	0	0	0	0	0

Last updated: 21 May 2022
Source: Competitions

=== Goalscorers ===
As of 14 February 2022

Rank	No.	Pos.	Nat.	Player	Ligue 1	Coupe de France	Europa League	Total
1	9	FW	(Poland)	Arkadiusz Milik	5	5	4	14
2	10	FW	(France)	Dimitri Payet	8	0	1	9
2	17	FW	(Turkey)	Cengiz Ünder	7	1	1	9
4	12	FW	(Senegal)	Bamba Dieng	4	0	0	4
4	8	MF	(Brazil)	Gerson	4	0	0	4
6	6	MF	(France)	Matteo Guendouzi	3	0	0	3
7	13	FW	(Democratic Republic of the Congo)	Cédric Bakambu	2	0	0	2
7	13	MF	(Morocco)	Amine Harit	1	1	0	2
9	15	DF	(Croatia)	Duje Ćaleta-Car	1	0	0	1
9	11	FW	(Brazil)	Luis Henrique	0	1	0	1
9	4	MF	(France)	Boubacar Kamara	1	0	0	1
9	29	DF	(Spain)	Pol Lirola	1	0	0	1
Totals					37	7	6	50
