= 2019–20 Olympique de Marseille season =

Marseille
2019–20 season
- President: Jacques-Henri Eyraud
- Head coach: André Villas-Boas
- Stadium: Stade Vélodrome
- Ligue 1: 2nd
- Coupe de France: Quarter-finals
- Coupe de la Ligue: Round of 32
- Top goalscorer: League: Darío Benedetto (11); All: Dimitri Payet (12)
- Highest home attendance: 65,421 (vs Lyon, 10 November 2019, Ligue 1)
- Lowest home attendance: 44,074 (vs Saint-Étienne, 1 September 2019, Ligue 1)
- Average home league attendance: 52,424
- Biggest win: 3–0 (vs. Granville (A), 17 January 2020, Coupe de France)
- Biggest defeat: 4–0 (vs. Paris Saint-Germain (A), 27 October 2019, Ligue 1)
| Home colours | Away colours | Third colours |

The 2019–20 season was Olympique de Marseille's 114th season in existence and the club's 24th consecutive season in the top flight of French football. In addition to the domestic league, Marseille participated in this season's editions of the Coupe de France, and the Coupe de la Ligue. The season covered the period from 1 July 2019 to 30 June 2020.

== Players ==
=== Squad ===
As of 3 September 2019.

Note: Flags indicate national team as defined under FIFA eligibility rules; some limited exceptions apply. Players may hold more than one non-FIFA nationality.

| No. | Pos. | Nation | Player |
|---|---|---|---|
| 1 | GK | CMR | Simon Ngapandouetnbu |
| 2 | DF | JPN | Hiroki Sakai |
| 3 | DF | ESP | Álvaro (on loan from Villarreal) |
| 4 | MF | FRA | Boubacar Kamara |
| 7 | MF | SRB | Nemanja Radonjić |
| 8 | MF | FRA | Morgan Sanson |
| 9 | FW | ARG | Darío Benedetto |
| 10 | FW | FRA | Dimitri Payet (third-captain) |
| 12 | MF | NED | Kevin Strootman |
| 15 | DF | CRO | Duje Ćaleta-Car |
| 16 | GK | FRA | Yohann Pelé |
| 17 | DF | SEN | Bouna Sarr |
| 18 | DF | FRA | Jordan Amavi |
| 21 | MF | FRA | Valentin Rongier |

| No. | Pos. | Nation | Player |
|---|---|---|---|
| 22 | MF | FRA | Grégory Sertic |
| 24 | MF | TUN | Saîf-Eddine Khaoui |
| 26 | FW | FRA | Florian Thauvin (vice-captain) |
| 27 | MF | FRA | Maxime Lopez |
| 28 | FW | FRA | Valère Germain |
| 29 | FW | FRA | Florian Chabrolle |
| 30 | GK | FRA | Steve Mandanda (captain) |
| 31 | DF | COM | Abdallah Ali Mohamed |
| 32 | DF | FRA | Lucas Perrin |
| 34 | MF | FRA | Alexandre Phliponeau |
| 36 | FW | FRA | Marley Aké |
| 38 | FW | FRA | Isaac Lihadji |
| 40 | GK | FRA | Ahmadou Dia |

=== Out on loan ===
Note: Flags indicate national team as defined under FIFA eligibility rules; some limited exceptions apply. Players may hold more than one non-FIFA nationality.

| No. | Pos. | Nation | Player |
|---|---|---|---|
| 11 | FW | GRE | Kostas Mitroglou (to PSV Eindhoven until 30 June 2020) |
| 20 | DF | FRA | Christopher Rocchia (to Sochaux until 30 June 2020) |

=== Reserve squad ===
As of 9 September 2019.

Note: Flags indicate national team as defined under FIFA eligibility rules; some limited exceptions apply. Players may hold more than one non-FIFA nationality.

| No. | Pos. | Nation | Player |
|---|---|---|---|
| — | GK | ARM | Manuel Nazaretian |
| — | GK | CMR | Simon Ngapandouetnbu |
| — | GK | TOG | Geoffrey Agbolossou |
| — | DF | FRA | Dembo Gassama |
| — | DF | FRA | Aaron Nassur Kamardin |
| — | DF | FRA | Niels Nkounkou |
| — | DF | FRA | Joakim Kada |
| — | DF | FRA | Yoann Araujo |
| — | DF | FRA | Zacharie Iscaye |
| — | DF | FRA | Richecard Richard |

| No. | Pos. | Nation | Player |
|---|---|---|---|
| — | DF | FRA | Loïs Fauriel |
| — | MF | FRA | Nassim Ahmed |
| — | MF | FRA | Cyril Khetir |
| — | MF | FRA | Tony Vives |
| — | FW | ALG | Mehdi Baaloudj |
| — | FW | TUN | Mohamed Ben Fredj |
| — | FW | FRA | Yacine Ressa |
| — | FW | FRA | Isaac Lihadji |
| — | FW | FRA | Ayem Assou |
| — | FW | FRA | Sacha Guilhen |

== Transfers ==
=== In ===
| Date | Player | From | Type | Fee | Ref |
|---|---|---|---|---|---|
| 30 June 2019 | (Tunisia) Saîf-Eddine Khaoui | Caen | Loan return | | |
| 30 June 2019 | (France) Grégory Sertic | (Switzerland) Zürich | Loan return | | |
| 19 July 2019 | (Spain) Álvaro | (Spain) Villarreal | Loan | | |
| 5 August 2019 | (Argentina) Darío Benedetto | (Argentina) Boca Juniors | Transfer | €14M | |
| 3 September 2019 | (France) Valentin Rongier | Nantes | Transfer | €13M | |

=== Out ===
| Date | Player | To | Type | Fee | Ref |
|---|---|---|---|---|---|
| 1 July 2019 | (France) Florian Escales | Laval | Transfer | Free | |
| 1 July 2019 | (Turkey) Yusuf Sari | (Turkey) Trabzonspor | Transfer | €250k | |
| 3 July 2019 | (Argentina) Lucas Ocampos | (Spain) Sevilla | Transfer | €15M | |
| 25 July 2019 | (Cameroon) Clinton N'Jie | (Russia) Dynamo Moscow | Transfer | €6M | |
| 27 August 2019 | (France) Adil Rami | (Turkey) Fenerbahçe | Transfer | Free | |
| 2 September 2019 | (Brazil) Luiz Gustavo | (Turkey) Fenerbahçe | Transfer | €6M | |

== Pre-season and friendlies ==
Win Draw Loss

| 7 July 2019 Friendly | Stoke City U23 | 0–1 | Marseille | Burton upon Trent, England |
| 11:00 BST (UTC+1) | | Report | Perrin 60' | Stadium: St George's Park |

| 11 July 2019 Friendly | Accrington Stanley | 2–1 | Marseille | City of Salford, England |
| 18:00 BST (UTC+1) | McConville 28'; Zanzala 37' (pen.) | Report | Thauvin 77' | Stadium: AJ Bell Stadium; Referee: Oliver Langford |

| 14 July 2019 Friendly | Rangers | 4–0 | Marseille | Glasgow, Scotland |
| 15:00 BST (UTC+1) | Candeias 17', 42'; Goldson 62'; Defoe 75' | Report | | Stadium: Ibrox Stadium; Attendance: 24,259; Referee: Bobby Madden |

| 19 July 2019 Friendly | Marseille | 2–1 | Bordeaux | Washington, D.C., United States |
| 21:00 EDT (UTC−4) | Payet 52', 57' | Report | Pablo 40' | Stadium: Audi Field |

| 24 July 2019 Friendly | D.C. United | 1–8 | Marseille | Washington, D.C., United States |
| 20:00 EDT (UTC−4) | Amarikwa 44' | Report | Ćaleta-Car (yellow card) 19'; Strootman 28' (pen.); Radonjić 48'; Lopez 52', 57'; Sarr 55', 85'; Chabrolle 83'; Khaoui 89' | Stadium: Audi Field; Attendance: 8,000; Referee: M. Greg O'Dell |

| 4 August 2019 Friendly | Marseille | 0–1 | Napoli | Marseille, France |
| 21:00 CEST (UTC+2) | Amavi (yellow card) 50'; Sakai (yellow card) 75'; Payet (yellow card) 76' | Report | Mertens 38', (yellow card) 44'; Maksimović (yellow card) 90' | Stadium: Stade Vélodrome; Attendance: 40,000; Referee: Jérémie Pignard (France) |

== Competitions ==
=== Overview ===
| Competition | First match | Last match | Starting round | Final position | Record | | | | | | | |
| Competition | First match | Last match | Starting round | Final position | Pld | W | D | L | GF | GA | GD | Win % |
|---|---|---|---|---|---|---|---|---|---|---|---|---|
| Ligue 1 | 10 August 2019 | 6 March 2020 | Matchday 1 | 2nd | 28 | 16 | 8 | 4 | 41 | 29 | +12 | 57.14 |
| Coupe de France | 5 January 2020 | 12 February 2020 | Round of 64 | Quarter-finals | 4 | 2 | 1 | 1 | 7 | 3 | +4 | 50.00 |
| Coupe de la Ligue | 30 October 2019 | | Round of 32 | Round of 32 | 1 | 0 | 0 | 1 | 1 | 2 | −1 | 0.00 |
| Total | | | | | 33 | 18 | 9 | 6 | 49 | 34 | +15 | 54.55 |

Source: Soccerway

=== Ligue 1 ===
==== League table ====
| Pos | Team | Pld | W | D | L | GF | GA | GD | Pts | PPG | Qualification or relegation |
|---|---|---|---|---|---|---|---|---|---|---|---|
| 1 | Paris Saint-Germain (C) | 27 | 22 | 2 | 3 | 75 | 24 | +51 | 68 | 2.52 | Qualification for the Champions League group stage |
| 2 | Marseille | 28 | 16 | 8 | 4 | 41 | 29 | +12 | 56 | 2.00 | Qualification for the Champions League group stage |
| 3 | Rennes | 28 | 15 | 5 | 8 | 38 | 24 | +14 | 50 | 1.79 | Qualification for the Champions League group stage |
| 4 | Lille | 28 | 15 | 4 | 9 | 35 | 27 | +8 | 49 | 1.75 | Qualification for the Europa League group stage (Note: Since the winners of the Coupe de France and the Coupe de la Ligue, Paris Saint-Germain, qualified for the Champions League, the spot given to the Coupe de France winners (Europa League group stage) was passed to the fifth-placed team and the spot given to the Coupe de la Ligue winners (Europa League second qualifying round) was passed to the sixth-placed team.) |
| 5 | Nice | 28 | 11 | 8 | 9 | 41 | 38 | +3 | 41 (Note: Nice finished ahead of Reims on head-to-head points: Nice 2–0 Reims, Reims 1–1 Nice.) | 1.46 | Qualification for the Europa League group stage |

Source: Ligue 1
Rules for classification: 1) Points per game; 2) Head-to-head points; 3) Head-to-head goal difference; 4) Goal difference; 5) Goals scored; 6) Fairplay ranking.
(C) Champions

==== Results summary ====
| Overall | | | | | | | | Home | | | | | | Away | | | | | |
| Pld | W | D | L | GF | GA | GD | Pts | W | D | L | GF | GA | GD | W | D | L | GF | GA | GD |
|---|---|---|---|---|---|---|---|---|---|---|---|---|---|---|---|---|---|---|---|
| 28 | 16 | 8 | 4 | 41 | 29 | +12 | 56 | 8 | 4 | 2 | 21 | 14 | +7 | 8 | 4 | 2 | 20 | 15 | +5 |

Last updated: 6 March 2020.
Source: Ligue 1

==== Results by round ====
| Round | 1 | 2 | 3 | 4 | 5 | 6 | 7 | 8 | 9 | 10 | 11 | 12 | 13 | 14 | 15 | 16 | 17 | 18 | 19 | 20 | 21 | 22 | 23 | 24 | 25 | 26 | 27 | 28 | 29 | 30 | 31 | 32 | 33 | 34 | 35 | 36 | 37 | 38 |
|---|---|---|---|---|---|---|---|---|---|---|---|---|---|---|---|---|---|---|---|---|---|---|---|---|---|---|---|---|---|---|---|---|---|---|---|---|---|---|
| Ground | H | A | A | H | A | H | A | H | A | H | A | H | H | A | H | A | H | A | H | A | H | A | A | H | A | H | A | H | A | H | A | H | A | H | A | H | H | A |
| Result | L | D | W | W | W | D | D | D | L | W | L | W | W | W | W | W | W | D | W | W | D | D | W | W | W | L | W | D | C | C | C | C | C | C | C | C | C | C |
| Position | 18 | 17 | 13 | 8 | 4 | 5 | 6 | 5 | 9 | 4 | 7 | 4 | 2 | 2 | 2 | 2 | 2 | 2 | 2 | 2 | 2 | 2 | 2 | 2 | 2 | 2 | 2 | 2 | 2 | 2 | 2 | 2 | 2 | 2 | 2 | 2 | 2 | 2 |

Source: Ligue 1
A = Away; H = Home; W = Win; D = Draw; L = Loss; C = Cancelled

==== Matches ====
The Ligue 1 schedule was announced on 14 June 2019. The Ligue 1 matches were suspended by the LFP on 13 March 2020 due to COVID-19 until further notices. On 28 April 2020, it was announced that Ligue 1 and Ligue 2 campaigns would not resume, after the country banned all sporting events until September. On 30 April, The LFP ended officially the 2019–20 season.

| 10 August 2019 1 | Marseille | 0–2 | Reims | Marseille |
| 17:30 CEST (UTC+2) | Kamara (yellow card) 29' | Report | Dia 58'; Suk 90' | Stadium: Stade Vélodrome; Attendance: 52,887; Referee: Jérôme Brisard |

| 17 August 2019 2 | Nantes | 0–0 | Marseille | Nantes |
| 17:30 CEST (UTC+2) | | Report | Sanson (yellow card) 42'; Kamara (yellow card) 48'; Strootman (yellow card) 87' | Stadium: Stade de la Beaujoire; Attendance: 34,832; Referee: Benoît Bastien |

| 28 August 2019 3 | Nice | 1–2 | Marseille | Nice |
| 21:00 CEST (UTC+2) | Cyprien 66' (pen.); Lees-Melou (yellow card) 90+4' | Report | Benedetto (yellow card) 18', (goal) 31'; Payet 73' (pen.) | Stadium: Allianz Riviera; Attendance: 31,825; Referee: Clément Turpin |

| 1 September 2019 4 | Marseille | 1–0 | Saint-Étienne | Marseille |
| 21:00 CEST (UTC+2) | Benedetto 33'; Sanson (yellow card) 60'; Amavi (yellow card) 66'; Lopez (yellow card) 88'; Khaoui (yellow card) 88'; Strootman (yellow card) 90' | Report | Moukoudi (yellow card) 14'; Perrin (yellow card) 73' | Stadium: Stade Vélodrome; Attendance: 44,074; Referee: Benoît Millot |

| 15 September 2019 5 | Monaco | 3–4 | Marseille | Monaco |
| 21:00 CEST (UTC+2) | Ben Yedder 17', 27'; Ballo-Touré (yellow card) 36'; Aguilar (yellow card) 42'; Keita 76', (yellow card) 90+1' | Report | Kamara (yellow card) 15'; Benedetto 39', 67', (yellow card) 90+1'; Germain 42'; Payet 61'; González (yellow card) 62' | Stadium: Stade Louis II; Attendance: 9,147; Referee: Antony Gautier |

| 21 September 2019 6 | Marseille | 1–1 | Montpellier | Marseille |
| 17:30 CEST (UTC+2) | Amavi (yellow card) 19'; Strootman (yellow card) 66'; Germain 75'; Kamara (red card) 90+2'; Payet (yellow card) 90+3' (yellow-red card) 90+3' | Report | Sarr 17' (o.g.); Souquet (yellow card) 22'; Oyongo (yellow card) 44'; Mendes (yellow card) 59'; Ferri (red card) 90+2' | Stadium: Stade Vélodrome; Attendance: 48,007; Referee: Amaury Delerue |

| 24 September 2019 7 | Dijon | 0–0 | Marseille | Dijon |
| 19:00 CEST (UTC+2) | Chouiar (yellow card) 54'; Mendyl (yellow card) 69'; Pereira (yellow card) 90+1' | Report | Perrin (yellow card) 71'; Sanson (yellow card) 74'; Germain (yellow card) 76' | Stadium: Stade Gaston Gérard; Attendance: 15,061; Referee: Jérémy Stinat |

| 29 September 2019 8 | Marseille | 1–1 | Rennes | Marseille |
| 21:00 CEST (UTC+2) | Ćaleta-Car 52'; Strootman (yellow card) 59'; Radonjić (yellow card) 86'; Perrin (yellow card) 90+3'; Sakai (yellow card) 90+4' | Report | Niang 19' | Stadium: Stade Vélodrome; Attendance: 44,281; Referee: Frank Schneider |

| 4 October 2019 9 | Amiens | 3–1 | Marseille | Amiens |
| 20:45 CEST (UTC+2) | Aleesami 11'; Guirassy 41' (pen.); Blin (yellow card) 67'; Mendoza 90+1' | Report | Benedetto 23'; Ćaleta-Car (yellow card) 39'; Lopez (yellow card) 42'; Rongier (yellow card) 66' | Stadium: Stade de la Licorne; Attendance: 12,737; Referee: Johan Hamel |

| 20 October 2019 10 | Marseille | 2–0 | Strasbourg | Marseille |
| 21:00 CEST (UTC+2) | Kamara 3'; Ćaleta-Car (yellow card) 26'; Sakai (yellow card) 53'; Benedetto (yellow card) 73'; Strootman 90+4' (pen.) | Report | Bellegarde (yellow card) 78'; Koné (yellow card) 90+3' | Stadium: Stade Vélodrome; Attendance: 50,203; Referee: Jérôme Brisard |

| 27 October 2019 11 | Paris Saint-Germain | 4–0 | Marseille | Paris |
| 21:00 CET (UTC+1) | Icardi 10', 26'; Mbappé 32', 44'; Dagba (yellow card) 39'; Bernat (yellow card) 59' | Report | Sakai (yellow card) 62' | Stadium: Parc des Princes; Attendance: 47,926; Referee: Benoît Bastien |

| 2 November 2019 12 | Marseille | 2–1 | Lille | Marseille |
| 17:30 CET (UTC+1) | Sanson 48'; Gabriel 80' (o.g.); Amavi (yellow card) 83' | Report | Djaló (yellow card) 23'; Ikoné (yellow card) 33'; Soumaoro 83'; Osimhen (yellow card) 83' | Stadium: Stade Vélodrome; Attendance: 53,321; Referee: Hakim Ben El Hadj |

| 10 November 2019 13 | Marseille | 2–1 | Lyon | Marseille |
| 21:00 CET (UTC+1) | Sarr (yellow card) 10'; Payet 18' (pen.), 39'; Álvaro (yellow card) 46' (yellow-red card) 64'; Rongier (yellow card) 83' | Report | Dembélé 59' | Stadium: Stade Vélodrome; Attendance: 65,421; Referee: Antony Gautier |

| 24 November 2019 14 | Toulouse | 0–2 | Marseille | Toulouse |
| 21:00 CET (UTC+1) | Sangaré (yellow card) 32'; Moreira (red card) 42'; Isimat-Mirin (yellow card) 63'; Amian (yellow card) 86' | Report | Strootman (yellow card) 70'; Benedetto 76'; Radonjić 79', (yellow card) 80'; Kamara (yellow card) 82' | Stadium: Stadium Municipal; Attendance: 23,002; Referee: François Letexier |

| 29 November 2019 15 | Marseille | 2–1 | Brest | Marseille |
| 20:45 CET (UTC+1) | Sarr 56'; Radonjić 89' | Report | Diallo (yellow card) 20'; Cardona 88'; Mendy (yellow card) 90+3' | Stadium: Stade Vélodrome; Attendance: 50,014; Referee: Johan Hamel |

| 3 December 2019 16 | Angers | 0–2 | Marseille | Angers |
| 19:00 CET (UTC+1) | Thomas (yellow card) 39' | Report | Strootman (yellow card) 15'; Sanson 17'; Payet 41' (pen.) | Stadium: Stade Raymond Kopa; Attendance: 12,455; Referee: Frank Schneider |

| 8 December 2019 17 | Marseille | 3–1 | Bordeaux | Marseille |
| 21:00 CET (UTC+1) | Amavi (yellow card) 28', (goal) 48'; Ćaleta-Car (yellow card) 45'; Sanson 60'; Radonjić 90+2' | Report | Adli 31', (yellow card) 45+3' | Stadium: Stade Vélodrome; Attendance: 52,079; Referee: Mikael Lesage |

| 14 December 2019 18 | Metz | 1–1 | Marseille | Metz |
| 17:30 CET (UTC+1) | Nguette 40'; Maïga (yellow card) 45+1'; Boye (yellow card) 85'; Udol (yellow card) 90+1'; Fofana (yellow card) 90+4' | Report | Sarr (yellow card) 25'; Radonjić 70' | Stadium: Stade Saint-Symphorien; Attendance: 20,586; Referee: Willy Delajod |

| 21 December 2019 19 | Marseille | 3–1 | Nîmes | Marseille |
| 20:45 CET (UTC+1) | Kamara (yellow card) 33'; Sanson (yellow card) 45+1'; Payet (yellow card) 45+2', (goal) 81'; Alakouch 46' (o.g.); Benedetto 65' | Report | Paquiez (yellow card) 26'; Sarr (yellow card) 63'; Briançon 90+1' | Stadium: Stade Vélodrome; Attendance: 59,043; Referee: François Letexier |

| 10 January 2020 20 | Rennes | 0–1 | Marseille | Rennes |
| 20:45 CET (UTC+1) | Traoré (yellow card) 32'; Da Silva (yellow card) 82' | Report | Sarr (yellow card) 30'; Ćaleta-Car (yellow card) 35'; Kamara (yellow card) 50'; Payet (yellow card) 79'; Strootman 84'; Sanson (yellow card) 89' | Stadium: Roazhon Park; Attendance: 28,896; Referee: Benoît Millot |

| 25 January 2020 21 | Marseille | 0–0 | Angers | Marseille |
| 17:30 CET (UTC+1) | Amavi (yellow card) 89' | Report | Alioui (yellow card) 54'; Manceau (yellow card) 81' | Stadium: Stade Vélodrome; Attendance: 55,761; Referee: Johan Hamel |

| 2 February 2020 22 | Bordeaux | 0–0 | Marseille | Bordeaux |
| 21:00 CET (UTC+1) | Otávio (yellow card) 36'; Pablo (yellow card) 39' | Report | Ćaleta-Car (yellow card) 6'; Kamara (yellow card) 81' | Stadium: Matmut Atlantique; Attendance: 36,196; Referee: Ruddy Buquet |

| 5 February 2020 23 | Saint-Étienne | 0–2 | Marseille | Saint-Étienne |
| 21:00 CET (UTC+1) | Fofana (yellow card) 61'; Khazri (yellow card) 65' | Report | Payet 7'; Amavi (yellow card) 25'; Radonjić (yellow card) 49', (goal) 85'; Rongier (yellow card) 57' | Stadium: Stade Geoffroy-Guichard; Attendance: 29,074; Referee: Jérôme Brisard |

| 8 February 2020 24 | Marseille | 1–0 | Toulouse | Marseille |
| 17:30 CET (UTC+1) | Álvaro (yellow card) 15'; Payet 51' | Report | Makengo (yellow card) 61'; Sylla (yellow card) 71' | Stadium: Stade Vélodrome; Attendance: 53,995; Referee: Stéphanie Frappart |

| 16 February 2020 25 | Lille | 1–2 | Marseille | Villeneuve-d'Ascq |
| 21:00 CET (UTC+1) | Osimhen 51' | Report | Ćaleta-Car (yellow card) 9'; Amavi (yellow card) 30'; Benedetto (yellow card) 35', (goal) 69'; Reinildo 66' (o.g.); Aké (yellow card) 90+1'; Strootman (yellow card) 90+3' | Stadium: Stade Pierre-Mauroy; Attendance: 47,314; Referee: Frank Schneider |

| 22 February 2020 26 | Marseille | 1–3 | Nantes | Marseille |
| 17:30 CET (UTC+1) | Sanson 39'; Amavi (yellow card) 44' | Report | Limbombe 34'; Simon (yellow card) 45+1'; Bamba 53'; Traoré (yellow card) 61'; Girotto (yellow card) 65'; Álvaro 90+1' (o.g.) | Stadium: Stade Vélodrome; Attendance: 60,430; Referee: Jérôme Miguelgorry |

| 28 February 2020 27 | Nîmes | 2–3 | Marseille | Nîmes |
| 20:45 CET (UTC+1) | Ferhat 5', (yellow card) 75'; Landre (yellow card) 14'; Sarr (yellow card) 78'; Deaux 90+1'; Paquiez (yellow card) 90+3' | Report | Benedetto 10', 36', 69'; Álvaro (yellow card) 71'; Payet (yellow card) 75'; Mandanda (yellow card) 90+1' | Stadium: Stade des Costières; Attendance: 13,755; Referee: Clément Turpin |

| 6 March 2020 28 | Marseille | 2–2 | Amiens | Marseille |
| 21:00 CET (UTC+1) | Amavi (yellow card) 17'; Payet (yellow card) 40', (goal) 57'; Sanson 45+1' | Report | Monconduit (yellow card) 38'; Calabresi (yellow card) 60'; Guirassy 84' (pen.); Ghoddos 90+4' | Stadium: Stade Vélodrome; Attendance: 49,748; Referee: François Letexier |

| 29 | Montpellier | Cancelled | Marseille | Montpellier |
| | | | | Stadium: Stade de la Mosson; Attendance: 0 |

| 30 | Marseille | Cancelled | Paris Saint-Germain | Marseille |
| | | | | Stadium: Stade Vélodrome; Attendance: 0 |

| 31 | Brest | Cancelled | Marseille | Brest |
| | | | | Stadium: Stade Francis-Le Blé; Attendance: 0 |

| 32 | Marseille | Cancelled | Dijon | Marseille |
| | | | | Stadium: Stade Vélodrome; Attendance: 0 |

| 33 | Lyon | Cancelled | Marseille | Décines-Charpieu |
| | | | | Stadium: Parc Olympique Lyonnais |

| 34 | Marseille | Cancelled | Nice | Marseille |
| | | | | Stadium: Stade Vélodrome |

| 35 | Strasbourg | Cancelled | Marseille | Strasbourg |
| | | | | Stadium: Stade de la Meinau |

| 36 | Marseille | Cancelled | Monaco | Marseille |
| | | | | Stadium: Stade Vélodrome |

| 37 | Marseille | Cancelled | Metz | Marseille |
| | | | | Stadium: Stade Vélodrome |

| 38 | Reims | Cancelled | Marseille | Reims |
| | | | | Stadium: Stade Auguste Delaune |

=== Coupe de France ===
| 5 January 2020 Round of 64 | Trélissac | 1–1 (a.e.t.) (2–4 p) | Marseille | Limoges |
| 14:15 CET (UTC+1) | Diaby 1'; Bisson (yellow card) 34'; Le Poulichet (yellow card) 115' | Report | Payet 20', (yellow card) 90+2'; Strootman (yellow card) 44'; Sakai (yellow card) 88' (yellow-red card) 90+1' | Stadium: Stade Municipal de Beaublanc; Attendance: 13,200; Referee: Jérôme Brisard |
| | Penalties |
| | Bigné (penalty scored); Aguad (penalty scored); Diakhaby (penalty missed); Gnaleko (penalty missed) | | (penalty scored) Payet; (penalty scored) Strootman; (penalty scored) Rongier; (penalty scored) Perrin |

| 17 January 2020 Round of 32 | Granville | 0–3 | Marseille | Caen |
| 21:05 CET (UTC+1) | Sea (yellow card) 10' (yellow-red card) 75'; Ehua (yellow card) 66' | Report | Sanson (yellow card) 16'; Sakai (yellow card) 47'; Strootman (yellow card) 59'; Álvaro (yellow card) 71', (goal) 77'; Radonjić 83'; Payet 90+2' | Stadium: Stade Michel d'Ornano; Attendance: 19,479; Referee: Antony Gautier |

| 29 January 2020 Round of 16 | Marseille | 3–1 | Strasbourg | Marseille |
| 21:05 CET (UTC+1) | Sarr 32'; Payet 43' (pen.); Lopez (yellow card) 57'; Kamara 90+5' | Report | Mitrović (yellow card) 18'; Corgnet 59'; Ndour (red card) 86'; Simakan (yellow card) 90+2' | Stadium: Stade Vélodrome; Attendance: 29,589; Referee: Mikael Lesage |

| 12 February 2020 Quarter-finals | Lyon | 1–0 | Marseille | Décines-Charpieu |
| 21:05 CET (UTC+1) | Tete (yellow card) 17'; Aouar 81'; Caqueret (yellow card) 89' | Report | Strootman (yellow card) 37'; Sanson (yellow card) 49'; Sakai (yellow card) 69' | Stadium: Parc Olympique Lyonnais; Attendance: 36,000; Referee: Benoît Millot |

=== Coupe de la Ligue ===
| 30 October 2019 Round of 32 | Monaco | 2–1 | Marseille | Monaco |
| 21:05 CET (UTC+1) | Jemerson (yellow card) 19'; Augustin 25'; Aguilar 40' | Report | Ćaleta-Car (yellow card) 62'; Lecomte 77' (o.g.); Amavi (yellow card) 82' | Stadium: Stade Louis II; Attendance: 9,883; Referee: Mikael Lesage |

== Statistics ==
=== Appearances and goals ===
| No. | Pos | Nat | Player | Total | | Ligue 1 | | Coupe de France | | Coupe de la Ligue | |
| No. | Pos | Nat | Player | Apps | Goals | Apps | Goals | Apps | Goals | Apps | Goals |
Goalkeepers
| 1 | GK | (Cameroon) CMR | Simon Ngapandouentnbu | 0 | 0 | 0 | 0 | 0 | 0 | 0 | 0 |
| 16 | GK | (France) FRA | Yohann Pelé | 5 | 0 | 1+1 | 0 | 3 | 0 | 0 | 0 |
| 30 | GK | (France) FRA | Steve Mandanda | 29 | 0 | 27 | 0 | 1 | 0 | 1 | 0 |
| 40 | GK | (France) FRA | Ahmadou Dia | 0 | 0 | 0 | 0 | 0 | 0 | 0 | 0 |
Defenders
| 2 | DF | (Japan) JPN | Hiroki Sakai | 25 | 0 | 19+2 | 0 | 3 | 0 | 1 | 0 |
| 3 | DF | (Spain) ESP | Álvaro | 24 | 1 | 19+1 | 0 | 4 | 1 | 0 | 0 |
| 15 | DF | (Croatia) CRO | Duje Ćaleta-Car | 26 | 1 | 20+3 | 1 | 2 | 0 | 1 | 0 |
| 17 | DF | (Senegal) SEN | Bouna Sarr | 32 | 2 | 25+2 | 1 | 3+1 | 1 | 1 | 0 |
| 18 | DF | (France) FRA | Jordan Amavi | 29 | 1 | 24+2 | 1 | 2 | 0 | 1 | 0 |
| 31 | DF | (Comoros) COM | Abdallah Ali Mohamed | 0 | 0 | 0 | 0 | 0 | 0 | 0 | 0 |
| 32 | DF | (France) FRA | Lucas Perrin | 5 | 0 | 4 | 0 | 0+1 | 0 | 0 | 0 |
Midfielders
| 4 | MF | (France) FRA | Boubacar Kamara | 28 | 2 | 24 | 1 | 3 | 1 | 1 | 0 |
| 7 | MF | (Serbia) SRB | Nemanja Radonjić | 25 | 6 | 8+13 | 5 | 1+2 | 1 | 0+1 | 0 |
| 8 | MF | (France) FRA | Morgan Sanson | 30 | 5 | 26+1 | 5 | 2 | 0 | 1 | 0 |
| 10 | MF | (France) FRA | Dimitri Payet | 27 | 12 | 22 | 9 | 4 | 3 | 1 | 0 |
| 12 | MF | (Netherlands) NED | Kevin Strootman | 30 | 2 | 15+10 | 2 | 3+1 | 0 | 1 | 0 |
| 21 | MF | (France) FRA | Valentin Rongier | 28 | 0 | 20+3 | 0 | 4 | 0 | 0+1 | 0 |
| 22 | MF | (France) FRA | Grégory Sertic | 0 | 0 | 0 | 0 | 0 | 0 | 0 | 0 |
| 24 | MF | (Tunisia) TUN | Saîf-Eddine Khaoui | 11 | 0 | 0+7 | 0 | 0+3 | 0 | 0+1 | 0 |
| 26 | MF | (France) FRA | Florian Thauvin | 2 | 0 | 0+2 | 0 | 0 | 0 | 0 | 0 |
| 27 | MF | (France) FRA | Maxime Lopez | 27 | 0 | 13+10 | 0 | 4 | 0 | 0 | 0 |
| 34 | MF | (France) FRA | Alexandre Philiponeau | 0 | 0 | 0 | 0 | 0 | 0 | 0 | 0 |
| 36 | MF | (France) FRA | Marley Aké | 13 | 0 | 0+9 | 0 | 0+3 | 0 | 1 | 0 |
Forwards
| 9 | FW | (Argentina) ARG | Darío Benedetto | 28 | 11 | 25+1 | 11 | 1+1 | 0 | 0 | 0 |
| 28 | FW | (France) FRA | Valère Germain | 30 | 2 | 14+11 | 2 | 4 | 0 | 1 | 0 |
| 29 | FW | (France) FRA | Florian Chabrolle | 2 | 0 | 0+1 | 0 | 0+1 | 0 | 0 | 0 |
| 38 | FW | (France) FRA | Isaac Lihadji | 0 | 0 | 0 | 0 | 0 | 0 | 0 | 0 |
Players transferred out during the season
| 19 | MF | (Brazil) BRA | Luiz Gustavo | 3 | 0 | 2+1 | 0 | 0 | 0 | 0 | 0 |

Last updated: 6 March 2020
Source: Competitions

=== Goalscorers ===
As of matches played until 6 March 2020

| Rank | No. | Pos. | Player | Ligue 1 | Coupe de France | Coupe de la Ligue | Total |
|---|---|---|---|---|---|---|---|
| 1 | 10 | FW | (France) Dimitri Payet | 9 | 3 | 0 | 12 |
| 2 | 9 | FW | (Argentina) Darío Benedetto | 11 | 0 | 0 | 11 |
| 3 | 7 | MF | (Serbia) Nemanja Radonjić | 5 | 1 | 0 | 6 |
| 4 | 8 | MF | (France) Morgan Sanson | 5 | 0 | 0 | 5 |
| 5 | 28 | FW | (France) Valère Germain | 2 | 0 | 0 | 2 |
| 5 | 4 | MF | (France) Boubacar Kamara | 1 | 1 | 0 | 2 |
| 5 | 17 | DF | (France) Bouna Sarr | 1 | 1 | 0 | 2 |
| 5 | 12 | MF | (Netherlands) Kevin Strootman | 2 | 0 | 0 | 2 |
| 9 | 18 | DF | (France) Jordan Amavi | 1 | 0 | 0 | 1 |
| 9 | 15 | DF | (Croatia) Duje Ćaleta-Car | 1 | 0 | 0 | 1 |
| 9 | 3 | DF | (Spain) Álvaro González | 0 | 1 | 0 | 1 |
| Own goals | | | | 3 | 0 | 1 | 4 |
| TOTAL | | | | 41 | 7 | 1 | 49 |

=== Clean sheets ===
As of 6 March 2020

| Rank | Name | Ligue 1 | Coupe de France | Coupe de la Ligue | Total |
|---|---|---|---|---|---|
| 1 | (France) Steve Mandanda | 9 | 0 | 0 | 9 |
| 2 | (France) Yohann Pelé | 0 | 1 | 0 | 1 |
| Total | | 9 | 1 | 0 | 10 |
