= Simon Ngapandouetnbu =

Cameroonian footballer (born 2003)

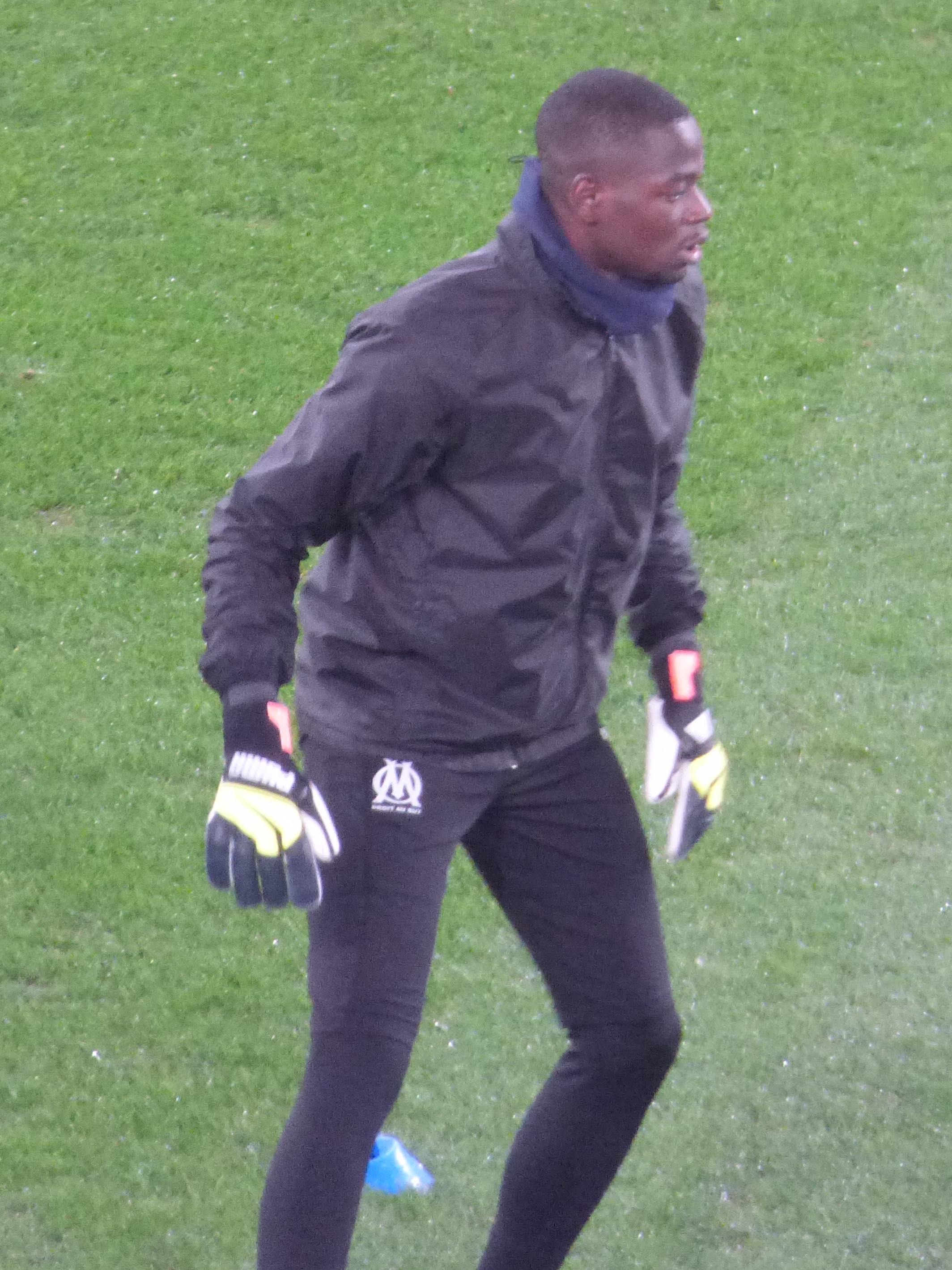
- Ngapandouetnbu in 2021

Personal information
- Full name: Simon Brady Ngapandouetnbu
- Date of birth: 12 April 2003 (age 23)
- Place of birth: Foumban, Cameroon
- Height: 1.86 m (6 ft 1 in)
- Position: Goalkeeper

Team information
- Current team: Montpellier
- Number: 31

Youth career
- 2011–2013: ASPTT Marseille
- 2013–2014: ASMJ Blancarde
- 2014–2019: Marseille

Senior career*
Years	Team	Apps	(Gls)
2019–2025	Marseille B	40	(0)
2019–2025	Marseille	0	(0)
2024–2025	→ Nîmes (loan)	26	(0)
2025–	Montpellier	31	(0)

International career^{‡}
2023	Cameroon U23	1	(0)
2026–	Cameroon	4	(0)
- * Club domestic league appearances and goals as of 11 May 2026 ‡ National team caps and goals as of 17:50, 31 March 2026 (UTC)

Simon Brady Ngapandouetnbu (born 12 April 2003) is a Cameroonian professional footballer who plays as a goalkeeper for French Ligue 2 club Montpellier and the Cameroon national team.

== Club career ==
Ngapandouetnbu is a product of the youth academies of ASPTT Marseille, ASMJ Blancarde, and Marseille. On 11 October 2019, he signed his first professional contract with Marseille for three years. That same year, he was promoted to their reserves and was backup keeper for the senior squad. He extended his contract with the club on 8 March 2022.

On 7 August 2025, Ngapandouetnbu signed with Montpellier in Ligue 2.

== International career ==
Born in Cameroon, Ngapandouetnbu moved to France at a young age. He was on the radar for the Cameroon U17s for the 2019 FIFA U-17 World Cup, and other youth sides for Cameroon. In November 2021, he was controversially called up to the France U19s for 2022 UEFA European Under-19 Championship qualification matches. In September 2022, he was formally called up to the senior Cameroon national team for a set of friendlies. He was included in Cameroon squad for 2022 FIFA World Cup as third goalkeeper. He played for the Cameroon U23s for a set of 2023 U-23 Africa Cup of Nations qualification matches in March 2023.

== Career statistics ==
=== Club ===
As of match played 20 March 2026

Appearances and goals by club, season and competition
Club	Season	League			Cup		League cup		Europe		Total	
Club	Season	Division	Apps	Goals	Apps	Goals	Apps	Goals	Apps	Goals	Apps	Goals
Marseille B	2019–20	CFA 2	8	0	—		—		—		8	0
Marseille B	2020–21	CFA 2	3	0	—		—		—		3	0
Marseille B	2021–22	CFA 2	11	0	—		—		—		11	0
Marseille B	2022–23	National 3	13	0	—		—		—		13	0
Marseille B	2023–24	National 3	5	0	—		—		—		5	0
Marseille B	Total		40	0	—		—		—		40	0
Marseille	2019–20	Ligue 1	0	0	0	0	0	0	—		0	0
Marseille	2020–21	Ligue 1	0	0	0	0	—		0	0	0	0
Marseille	2021–22	Ligue 1	0	0	0	0	—		0	0	0	0
Marseille	2022–23	Ligue 1	0	0	0	0	—		0	0	0	0
Marseille	2023–24	Ligue 1	0	0	0	0	—		0	0	0	0
Marseille	Total		0	0	0	0	0	0	0	0	0	0
Nîmes (loan)	2024–25	CFA	26	0	–		–		–		26	0
Montpellier (loan)	2025–26	Ligue 2	25	0	0	0	–		–		25	0
Career total			91	0	0	0	0	0	0	0	91	0

=== International ===
As of match played on 31 March 2026

Appearances and goals by national team and year
National team	Year	Apps	Goals
Cameroon	2026	1	0
Total		1	0
