= Yohann Pelé =

French footballer (born 1982)

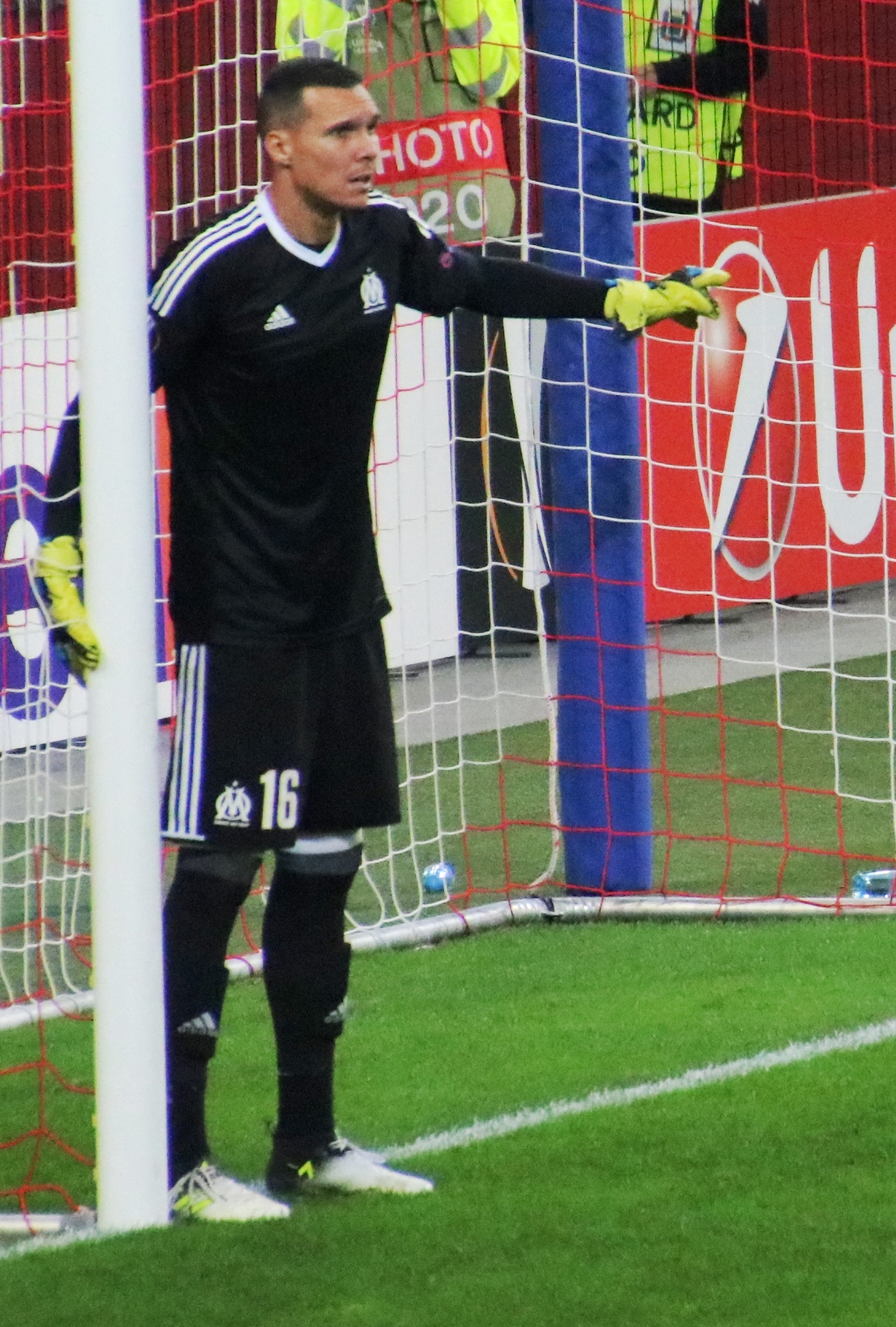
- Pelé playing for Marseille in 2017

Personal information
- Full name: Yohann Denis Patrick Pelé
- Date of birth: 4 November 1982 (age 44)
- Place of birth: Brou-sur-Chantereine, Seine-et-Marne, France
- Height: 1.96 m (6 ft 5 in)
- Position: Goalkeeper

Senior career*
| Years | Team | Apps | (Gls) |
| 1999–2009 | Le Mans | 164 | (0) |
| 2009–2012 | Toulouse | 18 | (0) |
| 2014–2015 | Sochaux | 49 | (0) |
| 2015–2021 | Marseille | 62 | (0) |
| Total | | 293 | (0) |

International career
| 2008 | France U21 | 2 | (0) |
- * Club domestic league appearances and goals

Yohann Denis Patrick Pelé (born 4 November 1982) is a French former professional footballer who played as a goalkeeper.

== Club career ==
=== Le Mans ===
Born in Brou-sur-Chantereine, Seine-et-Marne, Pelé spent most of his career at Le Mans, making his debut in Ligue 2 in a 1–0 defeat at FC Istres in September 2002. He established himself as the club's first-choice goalkeeper in the 2004–05 season, as the club won promotion to Ligue 1. He ultimately made 164 appearances for the club before his departure in 2009.

=== Toulouse ===
On 29 June 2009, he was transferred from Le Mans to Toulouse FC where he signed a four-year contract.

On 12 October 2010, Toulouse announced that Pelé was suffering from a pulmonary embolism. He ended up missing two seasons of football and at the end of the 2011–12 season he left the club.

=== Sochaux ===
In January and August 2013, Pelé trained with Dijon FCO and Vannes OC respectively in order to regain fitness. In January the following year, more than three years after his last competitive game, he signed a two-and-a-half-year contract with FC Sochaux-Montbéliard. He played 49 competitive matches for the club over the next two seasons before leaving to join Marseille in 2015.

=== Marseille ===
In July 2015, Pelé joined Ligue 1 club Marseille. After the departure of Steve Mandanda to Crystal Palace, he became Marseille's first choice goalkeeper. He finished the 2016–17 season playing all league matches, and with the most clean sheets in all of Europe's top five leagues.

On 3 May 2018, he played in the Europa League semi-finals away to FC Red Bull Salzburg as Marseilles played out a 2–1 away loss but a 3–2 aggregate win to secure a place in the 2018 UEFA Europa League Final played at the Parc Olympique Lyonnais in Décines-Charpieu, Lyon, France on 16 May 2018, versus Atlético Madrid.

== International career ==
Pelé was called up to the France U21s in 2008, and made two starts. He received his first call-up to the senior team in October 2008 for a friendly against Tunisia, but did not feature.

== Personal life ==
Yohann is the brother of Steven Pelé, a former footballer who played as a defender for various clubs in France, Israel and Romania.

== Career statistics ==
=== Club ===
Appearances and goals by club, season and competition
| Club | Season | League | | | National cup | | League cup | | Europe | | Other | | Total | |
| Club | Season | Division | Apps | Goals | Apps | Goals | Apps | Goals | Apps | Goals | Apps | Goals | Apps | Goals |
|---|---|---|---|---|---|---|---|---|---|---|---|---|---|---|
| Le Mans | 2000–01 | French Division 2 | 0 | 0 | 0 | 0 | 0 | 0 | — | | — | | 0 | 0 |
| Le Mans | 2001–02 | French Division 2 | 0 | 0 | 0 | 0 | 0 | 0 | — | | — | | 0 | 0 |
| Le Mans | 2002–03 | Ligue 2 | 2 | 0 | 0 | 0 | 1 | 0 | — | | — | | 3 | 0 |
| Le Mans | 2003–04 | Ligue 1 | 10 | 0 | 0 | 0 | 3 | 0 | — | | — | | 13 | 0 |
| Le Mans | 2004–05 | Ligue 2 | 24 | 0 | 0 | 0 | 2 | 0 | — | | — | | 26 | 0 |
| Le Mans | 2005–06 | Ligue 1 | 36 | 0 | 0 | 0 | 3 | 0 | — | | — | | 39 | 0 |
| Le Mans | 2006–07 | Ligue 1 | 29 | 0 | 2 | 0 | 2 | 0 | — | | — | | 33 | 0 |
| Le Mans | 2007–08 | Ligue 1 | 31 | 0 | 0 | 0 | 3 | 0 | — | | — | | 34 | 0 |
| Le Mans | 2008–09 | Ligue 1 | 32 | 0 | 3 | 0 | 1 | 0 | — | | — | | 36 | 0 |
| Le Mans | Total | | 164 | 0 | 5 | 0 | 15 | 0 | — | | — | | 184 | 0 |
| Toulouse | 2009–10 | Ligue 1 | 18 | 0 | 0 | 0 | 0 | 0 | 4 | 0 | — | | 22 | 0 |
| Toulouse | 2010–11 | Ligue 1 | 0 | 0 | 0 | 0 | 1 | 0 | — | | — | | 1 | 0 |
| Toulouse | Total | | 18 | 0 | 0 | 0 | 1 | 0 | 4 | 0 | — | | 23 | 0 |
| Sochaux | 2013–14 | Ligue 1 | 15 | 0 | 0 | 0 | — | | — | | — | | 15 | 0 |
| Sochaux | 2014–15 | Ligue 2 | 34 | 0 | 1 | 0 | 0 | 0 | — | | — | | 35 | 0 |
| Sochaux | Total | | 49 | 0 | 1 | 0 | 0 | 0 | — | | — | | 50 | 0 |
| Marseille | 2015–16 | Ligue 1 | 2 | 0 | 0 | 0 | 2 | 0 | 0 | 0 | — | | 4 | 0 |
| Marseille | 2016–17 | Ligue 1 | 38 | 0 | 3 | 0 | 2 | 0 | — | | — | | 43 | 0 |
| Marseille | 2017–18 | Ligue 1 | 10 | 0 | 1 | 0 | 1 | 0 | 8 | 0 | — | | 20 | 0 |
| Marseille | 2018–19 | Ligue 1 | 9 | 0 | 0 | 0 | 0 | 0 | 4 | 0 | — | | 13 | 0 |
| Marseille | 2019–20 | Ligue 1 | 2 | 0 | 3 | 0 | 0 | 0 | — | | — | | 5 | 0 |
| Marseille | 2020–21 | Ligue 1 | 1 | 0 | 2 | 0 | — | | 0 | 0 | 1 | 0 | 4 | 0 |
| Marseille | Total | | 62 | 0 | 9 | 0 | 5 | 0 | 12 | 0 | 1 | 0 | 89 | 0 |
| Career total | | | 631 | 0 | 29 | 0 | 19 | 0 | 115 | 0 | 3 | 0 | 797 | 0 |

== Honours ==
Marseille

- UEFA Europa League runner-up: 2017–18
