= Boubacar Kamara =

French footballer (born 1999)

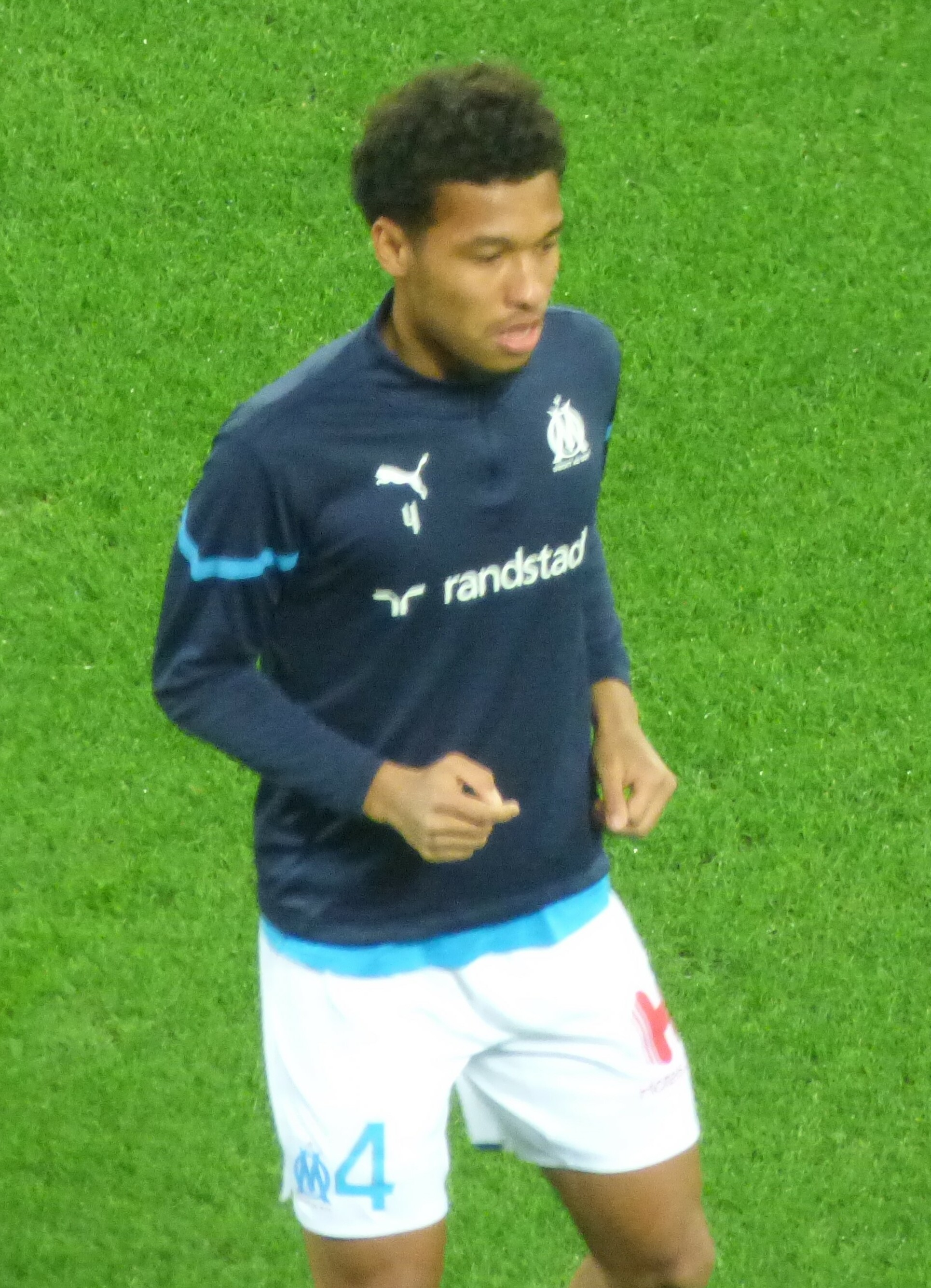
- Kamara warming up for Marseille in 2022

Personal information
- Full name: Boubacar Bernard Kamara
- Date of birth: 23 November 1999 (age 26)
- Place of birth: Marseille, France
- Height: 1.84 m (6 ft 0 in)
- Position: Defensive midfielder

Team information
- Current team: Aston Villa
- Number: 8

Youth career
- 2005–2017: Marseille

Senior career*
Years	Team	Apps	(Gls)
2016–2018	Marseille II	28	(0)
2016–2022	Marseille	130	(3)
2022–	Aston Villa	99	(2)

International career^{‡}
2015–2016	France U17	9	(0)
2016–2017	France U18	9	(0)
2017–2018	France U19	14	(0)
2018–2019	France U20	7	(0)
2019–2021	France U21	9	(0)
2022–2023	France	5	(0)
- * Club domestic league appearances and goals as of 21 November 2026 (UTC) ‡ National team caps and goals as of 18 November 2023 (UTC)

Boubacar Bernard Kamara (born 23 November 1999) is a French professional footballer who plays as a defensive midfielder for Premier League club Aston Villa. Mainly a defensive midfielder, he can also play as a centre-back.

== Club career ==
=== Marseille ===
In September 2005, "Bouba", aged 5, entered the Olympique de Marseille Academy where he progressed through all the categories. He eventually became the captain of the U19 team that made its way to the final of the Coupe Gambardella. At the age of 16, he was promoted to Marseille's reserve team, also making his debut with the senior team. As coach of the reserves, Jacques Abardonado made him a regular starter.

Kamara made his debut as a professional side on 13 December 2016 against Sochaux in a Coupe de la Ligue match. He started the match and was replaced by Hiroki Sakai in the 82nd minute of a 1–1 (4–3) away loss on penalties. He scored his first professional goal on 5 February 2019, a header in a 1–0 home Ligue 1 victory over Bordeaux.

Kamara went onto play 170 times for his boyhood club, under several different managers – being used mainly as a defensive midfielder, but also featuring as a right-back, left-back, central midfielder and right-sided midfielder.

=== Aston Villa ===
On 23 May 2022, it was announced that 22-year-old Kamara had signed a five-year contract with English club Aston Villa ahead of the expiry of his Marseille contract on 1 July. He made his Aston Villa debut on 6 August 2022, in a 2–0 defeat to AFC Bournemouth. On 16 September 2022, during a 1–0 victory over Southampton, Kamara jarred his knee in a tackle with Mohamed Elyounoussi – the subsequent ligament strain ruled Kamara out until November, meaning that he missed the 2022 FIFA World Cup. Kamara returned to the pitch slightly ahead of schedule on 6 November 2022, in a 3–1 victory over Manchester United.

On 27 September 2023, Kamara scored his first goal for Aston Villa in a 2–1 EFL Cup defeat to Everton.

On 11 February 2024, Kamara suffered another knee injury in a league defeat to Manchester United, this time a more serious ACL injury that was expected to leave him sidelined for the rest of the season at the shortest.

Kamara returned to football on 5 October 2024, playing 45 minutes for Aston Villa's Under-21 team in a Premier League 2 game against Newcastle United. He made his full return to the first team on 22 October 2024, as a substitute in a 2–0 UEFA Champions League victory over Bologna.

On 16 May 2025, Kamara scored his first Premier League goal for Aston Villa during a 2–0 win against Tottenham Hotspur.

On 24 July 2025, Kamara signed a new contract with Aston Villa, lasting until 2030.

On 10 January 2026, Kamara suffered another serious knee injury after he was on the end of a late challenge by João Palhinha less than 10 minutes into an FA Cup victory over Tottenham Hotspur. Manager Unai Emery confirmed that it was the same knee that Kamara had previously injured. After further tests, it was revealed that Kamara was set to be out for the rest of the season. Kamara returned in August 2026, scoring in the pre-season 3-1 victory over Thai Premier League BG Pathum United.

== International career ==
Kamara was eligible to play for the national teams of France through birth, and Senegal through his family heritage. He played youth football for France at U17, U18, U19, U20 and U21 levels. Featuring in the 2019 FIFA U-20 World Cup and the 2021 UEFA European Under-21 Championship for France.

In 2022, Kamara was contacted directly by Senegal manager Aliou Cissé to convince him to declare for the Senegalese team after their 2021 Africa Cup of Nations victory to fill the space of ageing midfielders Idrissa Gueye and Cheikhou Kouyaté.

However, despite Cissé stating that there was an "agreement in principle" between the parties, on 19 May 2022, Kamara was selected in the France first team for the first time. 22-year-old Kamara made his debut on 6 June 2022, as a second half substitute in a 1–1 away UEFA Nations League draw against Croatia, thus committing his international future to France.

== Style of play ==
Predominantly a defensive midfielder, Kamara can also occasionally be deployed as a centre-back, having previously played in this position during his youth career.

While at Marseille, Kamara received praise for his awareness and positioning, as well as his ability to win 50–50 duels and regain position in the final third of the pitch. With Aston Villa, Kamara functioned as a playmaker, providing distribution to his teammates. He would frequently drop back to a centre-back position when the team were defending and take long touches to slow down play. In their list of the best defensive midfielders in the world in 2026, Sports Illustrated described Kamara as "the glue holding everything together" for Villa, praising his ball recovery abilities and passing.

== Personal life ==
Kamara was born in Marseille and raised in Woumpou, Mauritania. Kamara has been a supporter of OM since he was a child after going to the Stade Vélodrome with his mother Cathy. He has two sons and a daughter with Coralie Porrovecchio. According to the BBC, Kamara is a Muslim.

== Career statistics ==
=== Club ===
As of match played 21 November 2026

Appearances and goals by club, season and competition
Club	Season	League			National cup (Note: Includes Coupe de France, FA Cup)		League cup (Note: Includes Coupe de la Ligue, EFL Cup)		Europe		Other		Total	
Club	Season	Division	Apps	Goals	Apps	Goals	Apps	Goals	Apps	Goals	Apps	Goals	Apps	Goals
Marseille II	2015–16	Championnat National 2	8	0	—		—		—		—		8	0
Marseille II	2016–17	Championnat National 2	15	0	—		—		—		—		15	0
Marseille II	2017–18	Championnat National 2	4	0	—		—		—		—		4	0
Marseille II	2018–19	Championnat National 2	1	0	—		—		—		—		1	0
Marseille II	Total		28	0	—		—		—		—		28	0
Marseille	2016–17	Ligue 1	0	0	0	0	1	0	—		—		1	0
Marseille	2017–18	Ligue 1	6	0	2	0	0	0	6 (Note: Appearances in UEFA Europa League)	0	—		14	0
Marseille	2018–19	Ligue 1	31	1	0	0	0	0	5	0	—		36	1
Marseille	2019–20	Ligue 1	24	1	3	1	1	0	—		—		28	2
Marseille	2020–21	Ligue 1	35	0	2	0	—		5 (Note: Appearances in UEFA Champions League)	0	1 (Note: Appearance in Trophée des Champions)	0	43	0
Marseille	2021–22	Ligue 1	34	1	2	0	—		12 (Note: Five appearances in UEFA Europa League, seven appearances in UEFA Europa Conference League)	0	—		48	1
Marseille	Total		130	3	9	1	2	0	28	0	1	0	170	4
Aston Villa	2022–23	Premier League	24	0	0	0	2	0	—		—		26	0
Aston Villa	2023–24	Premier League	20	0	3	0	1	1	6 (Note: Appearances in UEFA Europa Conference League)	0	—		30	1
Aston Villa	2024–25	Premier League	26	1	4	0	1	0	10	0	—		41	1
Aston Villa	2025–26	Premier League	18	1	1	0	1	0	6	0	—		26	1
Aston Villa	2026–27	Premier League	11	0	0	0	0	0	3	0	1 (Note: Appearance in UEFA Super Cup)	0	15	0
Aston Villa	Total		99	2	8	0	5	1	25	0	1	0	138	3
Career total			257	5	17	1	7	1	53	0	2	0	336	7

=== International ===
As of match played 18 November 2023

Appearances and goals by national team and year
National team	Year	Apps	Goals
France	2022	3	0
France	2023	2	0
Total		5	0

== Honours ==
Marseille

- UEFA Europa League runner-up: 2017–18

Aston Villa

- UEFA Europa League: 2025–26
