= Florian Chabrolle =

French footballer (born 1998)

Personal information
- Date of birth: 7 April 1998 (age 28)
- Place of birth: Montmorency, France
- Height: 1.71 m (5 ft 7 in)
- Positions: Attacking midfielder; forward

Team information
- Current team: Pays de Grasse
- Number: 11

Youth career
- 2004–2011: Deuil Enghien F.C.
- 2011–2014: Entente SSG
- 2014–2018: Marseille

Senior career*
Years	Team	Apps	(Gls)
2015–2021	Marseille B	92	(17)
2019–2021	Marseille	1	(0)
2021–2023	Ajaccio	21	(0)
2021–2023	Ajaccio B	9	(0)
2024–	Pays de Grasse	0	(0)

International career
2016	France U18	2	(0)
- * Club domestic league appearances and goals as of 21 September 2024

Florian Chabrolle (born 7 April 1998) is a French professional footballer who plays as an attacking midfielder or forward for Championnat National 1 club Pays de Grasse. He is of Martiniquais and Algerian descent.

== Club career ==
Chabrolle made his professional debut on 29 November 2018 in the UEFA Europa League group stage against Eintracht Frankfurt. He replaced Valère Germain after 64 minutes in a 4–0 away loss.

== Career statistics ==
As of match played 19 April 2022

Appearances and goals by club, season and competition
Club	Season	League			National cup		Other		Total	
Club	Season	Division	Apps	Goals	Apps	Goals	Apps	Goals	Apps	Goals
Marseille B	2015–16	CFA	18	2	—		—		18	2
Marseille B	2016–17	CFA	18	1	—		—		18	1
Marseille B	2017–18	National 2	24	4	—		—		24	4
Marseille B	2018–19	National 2	23	9	—		—		23	9
Marseille B	2019–20	National 2	8	1	—		—		8	1
Marseille B	2020–21	National 2	1	0	—		—		1	0
Marseille B	Total		92	17	—		—		92	17
Marseille	2018–19	Ligue 1	0	0	0	0	1 (Note: Appearance in the UEFA Europa League)	0	1	0
Marseille	2019–20	Ligue 1	1	0	1	0	0	0	2	0
Marseille	Total		1	0	1	0	1	0	3	0
Ajaccio	2020–21	Ligue 2	2	0	0	0	—		2	0
Ajaccio	2021–22	Ligue 2	12	0	0	0	—		12	0
Ajaccio	Total		14	0	0	0	—		14	0
Ajaccio B	2021–22	National 3	5	0	—		—		5	0
Career total			112	17	1	0	1	0	114	17
