= Álvaro González (footballer, born 1990) =

Spanish footballer (born 1990)

Álvaro
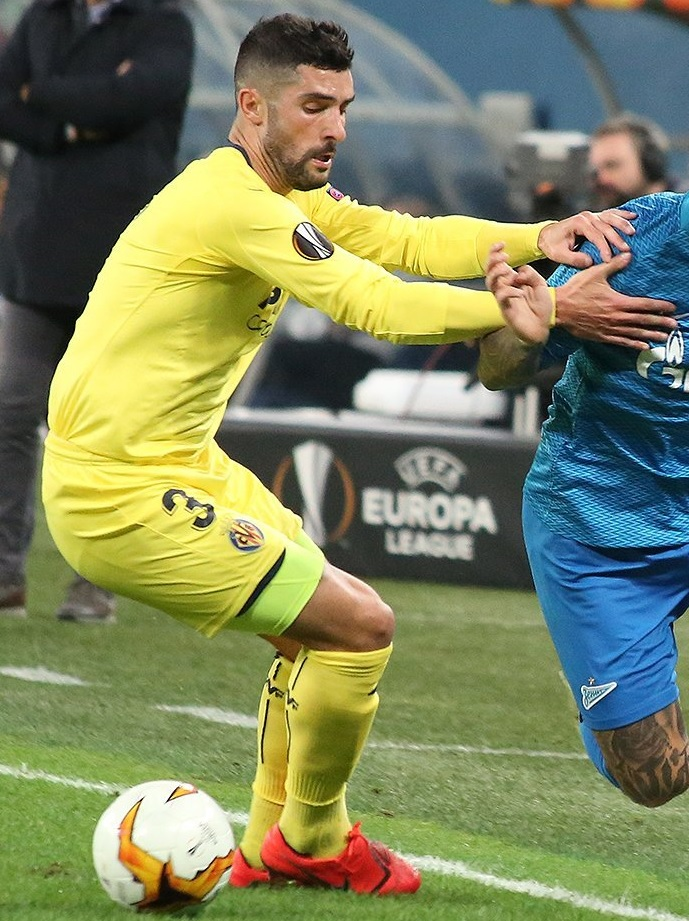
- Álvaro with Villarreal in 2019

Personal information
- Full name: Álvaro González Soberón
- Date of birth: 8 January 1990 (age 36)
- Place of birth: Potes, Spain
- Height: 1.83 m (6 ft 0 in)
- Position: Centre-back

Youth career
- 2003–2009: Racing Santander

Senior career*
Years	Team	Apps	(Gls)
2009–2011	Racing B	48	(0)
2011–2012	Racing Santander	37	(1)
2012–2014	Zaragoza	72	(2)
2014–2016	Espanyol	74	(1)
2016–2020	Villarreal	89	(2)
2019–2020	→ Marseille (loan)	20	(0)
2020–2022	Marseille	38	(2)
2022–2023	Al-Nassr	22	(1)
2023–2024	Al Qadsiah	19	(0)
2025	Johor Darul Ta'zim	0	(0)
2025	Tenerife	9	(1)

International career
2013	Spain U21	1	(0)
- * Club domestic league appearances and goals as of 16:49, 23 January 2026 (UTC)

Álvaro González Soberón (born 8 January 1990), known simply as Álvaro, is a Spanish professional footballer who plays as a central defender.

He began his career with Racing de Santander, and had spells at Zaragoza, Espanyol and Villarreal for La Liga totals of 233 matches and five goals. He signed for Marseille in 2019, initially on loan.

Álvaro won the 2013 European Under-21 Championship with Spain.

== Club career ==
=== Racing Santander ===
Born in Potes, Cantabria, Álvaro was a product of local club Racing de Santander's youth ranks, and made his professional debut in the 2009–10 season, appearing in 23 games for the reserves in the Segunda División B and being relegated. He made his first-team and La Liga debut on 1 May 2011, starting and playing 82 minutes in a 2–0 home win against RCD Mallorca.

In May 2011, Álvaro signed a four-year contract with Racing. Due to injuries to teammates, he began 2011–12 in the starting eleven. On 14 November, a €2 million offer from FC Dnipro Dnipropetrovsk was rejected. He remained a starter until the end of the campaign, when they were relegated.

=== Zaragoza ===
On 11 July 2012, Álvaro signed a four-year deal with Real Zaragoza. In his first year he was again first choice, but the Aragonese side also dropped down to the Segunda División.

Álvaro scored his first goal for the team on 10 November 2012, in a 5–3 victory over Deportivo de La Coruña.

=== Espanyol and Villarreal ===
On 28 July 2014, Álvaro returned to the top flight after agreeing to a five-year contract with RCD Espanyol. In preparation for 2016–17 he was made fourth captain behind Javi López, Víctor Sánchez and Víctor Álvarez, but on 31 August 2016 he was transferred to Villarreal CF on a four-year deal.

Álvaro made his competitive debut for Villarreal on 15 September 2016, in a 2–1 home win against FC Zürich in the group stage of the UEFA Europa League. His first league appearance came ten days later in the 3–1 home defeat of CA Osasuna where he played 90 minutes and gave away a penalty which resulted in the opponent's goal.

=== Marseille ===
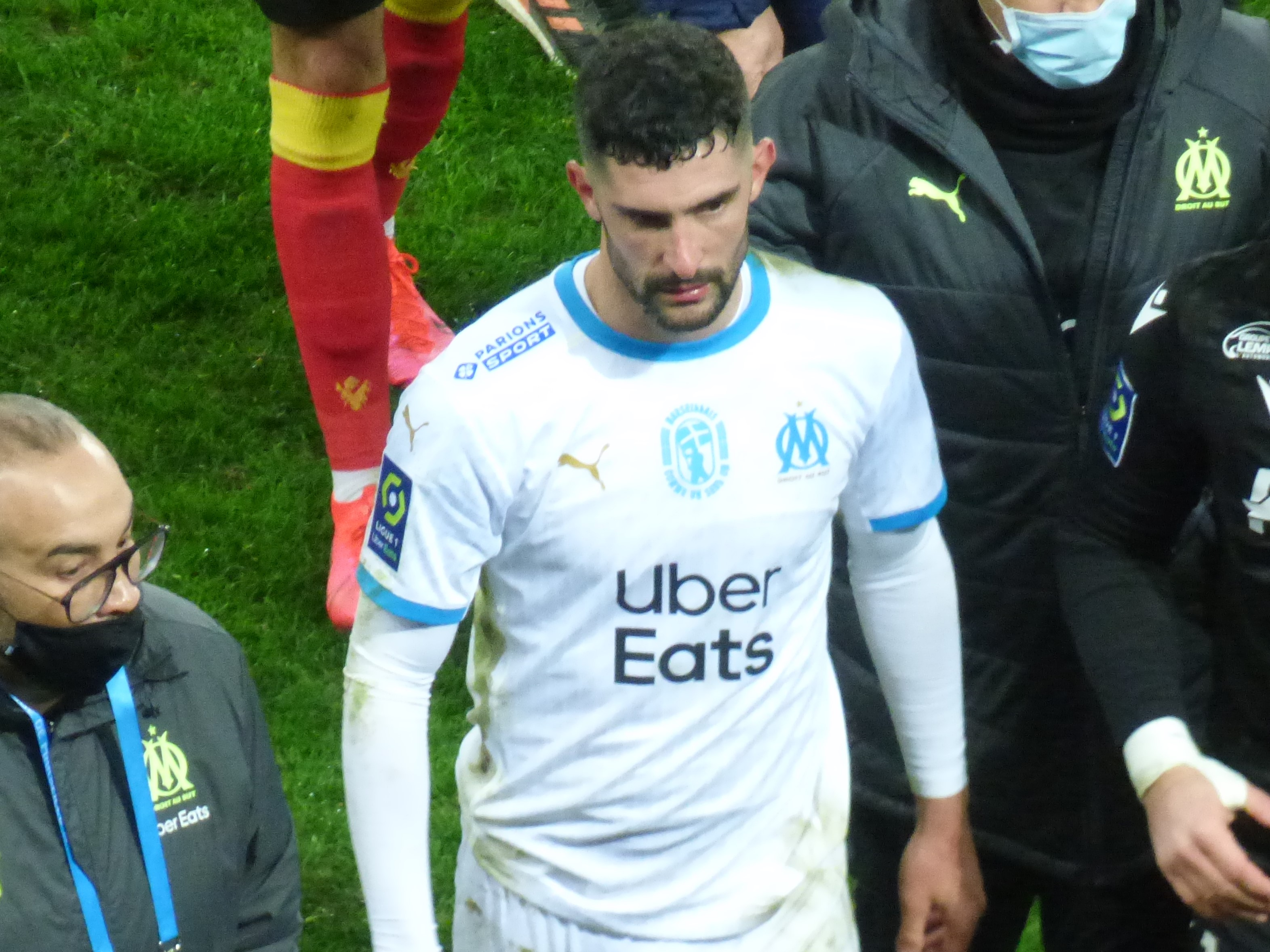
Álvaro playing for Marseille at Lens in February 2021

On 19 July 2019, Álvaro joined French club Olympique de Marseille on a season-long loan, with a mandatory purchase option of €5 million on 30 June 2020. During a Ligue 1 match against Paris Saint-Germain FC on 13 September 2020, he was involved in a mass brawl which resulted in five players receiving red cards; after the incident, PSG forward Neymar claimed that the incident began following racist remarks from Álvaro.

Álvaro scored his first goal in the French top tier on 17 February 2021, opening the 3–2 home win over OGC Nice. In March 2022, having ceased to be part of manager Jorge Sampaoli's plans, he profited from an international break to return to his country, and subsequently failed to report to training.

On 1 August 2022, Álvaro was released from his contract.

=== Later career ===
On 29 August 2022, Álvaro agreed to a one-year deal at Al-Nassr FC of the Saudi Professional League, with the option to extend for another. He scored his only goal for the second-placed team on 8 May 2023, closing the 1–1 home draw against Al-Khaleej FC.

On 20 July 2023, Álvaro joined Saudi First Division League club Al Qadsiah FC on a free transfer. He won promotion to the Pro League in his only season, as champion.

In February 2025, Álvaro moved to the Malaysia Super League with Johor Darul Ta'zim F.C. alongside his compatriots Roque Mesa and Jonathan Viera; all were aged 35. He made his first appearance on 11 February, and scored a brace in the 2–1 victory at Central Coast Mariners FC in the league stage of the AFC Champions League Elite.

González returned to his home country on 12 July 2025, signing a two-year contract with Primera Federación side CD Tenerife. He left in December, however.

== International career ==
Álvaro earned his only cap for Spain at under-21 level on 12 June 2013, in a 3–0 defeat of the Netherlands in the group phase of the UEFA European Championship. His team went on to win the tournament in Israel.

== Career statistics ==
As of match played 17 February 2022

Club	Season	League			Cup^{1}		League Cup^{2}		Continental^{3}		Other^{4}		Total	
Club	Season	Division	Apps	Goals	Apps	Goals	Apps	Goals	Apps	Goals	Apps	Goals	Apps	Goals
Racing B	2009–10	Segunda División B	23	0	—								23	0
Racing Santander	2010–11	La Liga	3	0	0	0	—						3	0
Racing Santander	2011–12	La Liga	34	1	1	0	—						35	1
Racing Santander	Total		37	1	1	0	—						38	1
Zaragoza	2012–13	La Liga	33	1	4	0	—						37	1
Zaragoza	2013–14	Segunda División	39	1	1	0	—						40	1
Zaragoza	Total		72	2	5	0	—						77	2
Espanyol	2014–15	La Liga	36	1	6	0	—						42	1
Espanyol	2015–16	La Liga	36	0	2	0	—						38	0
Espanyol	2016–17	La Liga	2	0	0	0	—						2	0
Espanyol	Total		74	1	8	0	—						82	1
Villarreal	2016–17	La Liga	23	1	4	0	—		5	0	—		32	1
Villarreal	2017–18	La Liga	33	0	2	0	—		3	0	—		38	0
Villarreal	2018–19	La Liga	33	1	1	0	—		7	0	—		41	1
Villarreal	Total		89	2	7	0	—		15	0	—		111	2
Marseille (loan)	2019–20	Ligue 1	20	0	4	1	0	0	—		—		24	1
Marseille	2020–21	Ligue 1	32	2	1	0	—		6	0	1	0	40	2
Marseille	2021–22	Ligue 1	6	0	2	0	—		3	0	—		11	0
Marseille	Total		58	2	7	1	0	0	9	0	1	0	75	3
Career total			353	8	28	1	0	0	24	0	1	0	406	9

^{1}Includes Copa del Rey and Coupe de France

^{2}Includes Coupe de la Ligue

^{3}Includes UEFA Europa League, UEFA Champions League and UEFA Europa Conference League

^{4}Includes Trophée des Champions

== Honours ==
Al Qadsiah

- Saudi First Division League: 2023–24

Spain U21

- UEFA European Under-21 Championship: 2013
