= Steve Mandanda =

Footballer (born 1985)

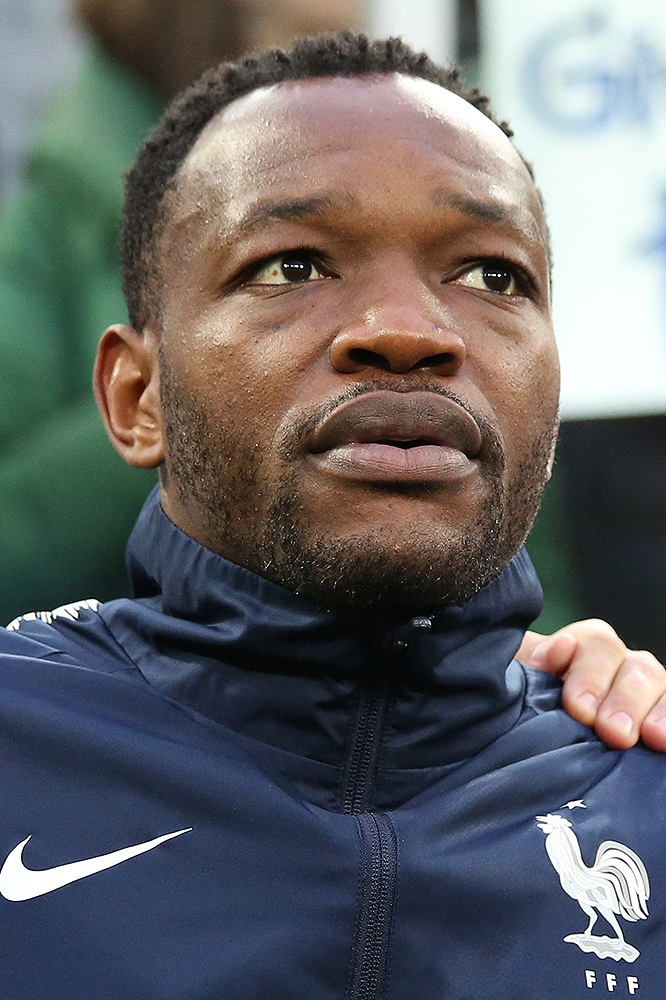
- Mandanda with France in 2018

Personal information
- Full name: Steve Mandanda Mpidi
- Date of birth: 28 March 1985 (age 41)
- Place of birth: Kinshasa, Zaire
- Height: 1.87 m (6 ft 2 in)
- Position: Goalkeeper

Youth career
- 1994–2000: ALM Évreux
- 2000–2004: Le Havre

Senior career*
Years	Team	Apps	(Gls)
2004–2008	Le Havre	67	(0)
2007–2008	→ Marseille (loan)	34	(0)
2008–2016	Marseille	300	(0)
2016–2017	Crystal Palace	10	(0)
2017–2022	Marseille	135	(0)
2022–2025	Rennes	86	(0)
Total		631	(0)

International career
2004–2006	France U21	28	(0)
2008	France B	2	(0)
2008–2022	France	35	(0)
Medal record
Men's football
Representing France
FIFA World Cup
Winner	2018 Russia
Runner-up	2022 Qatar
UEFA European Championship
Runner-up	2016 France
- * Club domestic league appearances and goals

Steve Mandanda Mpidi (French pronunciation: [stɛv mɑ̃dɑ̃da]; born 28 March 1985) is a former professional footballer who played as a goalkeeper.

A product of the Le Havre academy, Mandanda spent most of his professional career with Marseille, making 614 appearances across all competitions in two spells at the club, and was voted Ligue 1 Goalkeeper of the Year five times. He also had a short stint with English club Crystal Palace between his spells at Marseille. In 2022, Mandanda joined Rennes, and retired three years later.

Born in Zaire (present-day DR Congo), Mandanda played for the France national team, making his debut in 2008. He represented France at seven international tournaments: four UEFA European Championships (2008, 2012, 2016 and 2020) and three FIFA World Cups (2010, 2018, 2022), winning the tournament in 2018.

== Club career ==
=== Early career ===
Mandanda was born on 28 March 1985 in Kinshasa, Democratic Republic of the Congo (then Zaire), but he moved with his family to Évreux, France when he was two years old. He practiced boxing before joining the local team ALM Évreux at age nine. He acquired French nationality by naturalization in May 2003.

=== Le Havre ===
Mandanda made his league debut for Le Havre in August 2005, and did not concede a goal until his fourth match. He played 30 league matches in the 2005–06 season and 37 in 2006–07, with his performances attracting the attention of other clubs. Following an unsuccessful trial at Aston Villa prior to the 2007–08 season, he joined Marseille in summer 2007.

=== Marseille ===
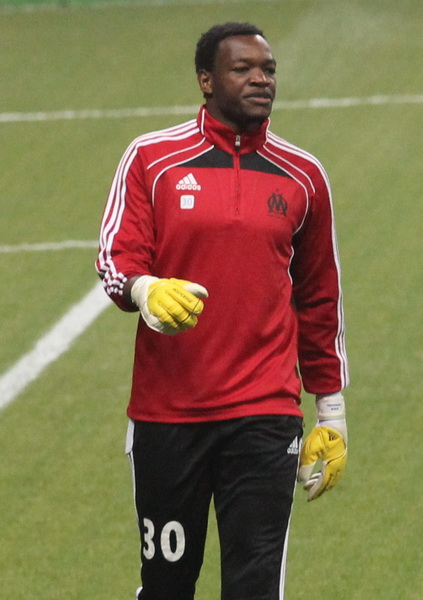
Mandanda with Marseille in 2010

At the start of his first season with Marseille, Mandanda was regarded as an understudy to first choice keeper Mitchell te Vrede. However a knee injury ruled Carrasso out for six months, leaving the way clear for Mandanda to become a regular fixture in Ligue 1, Champions League and UEFA Cup matches. On 5 March 2008, Mandanda joined Marseille on a permanent four-year contract.

At the end of Mandanda's final season at Marseille he was named as the club's Player of the Season. It was the second time that he won the award having previously done so in the 2007-08 campaign.

=== Crystal Palace ===
On 1 July 2016, Premier League club Crystal Palace announced that they had completed the signing of Mandanda on a free transfer from Marseille. He struggled to make an impact, being injured for most of the season. He made just ten appearances.

=== Return to Marseille ===
On 11 July 2017, Mandanda returned to Olympique de Marseille on a three-year contract for €3 million.

On 22 December 2018, Mandanda played his 500th match for Marseille, in a 1–1 draw at Angers. On 25 August 2020, aged 35, he prolonged his contract until 2024.

=== Rennes ===
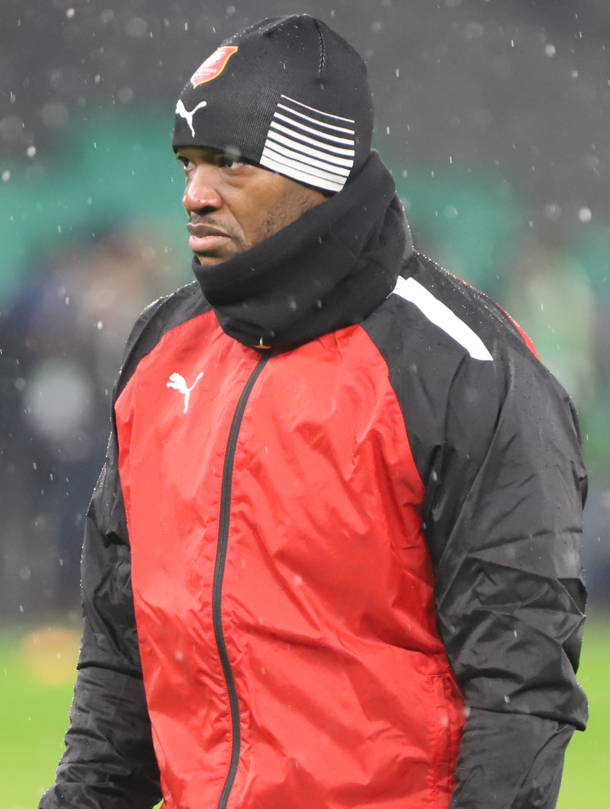
Mandanda warming up with Rennes in 2025

On 6 July 2022, Rennes announced the signing of Mandanda on a two-year deal. On 8 January 2024, Mandanda extended his contract with Rennes until June 2025.

On 10 September 2025, Mandanda officially announced his retirement from professional football at the age of 40.

== International career ==
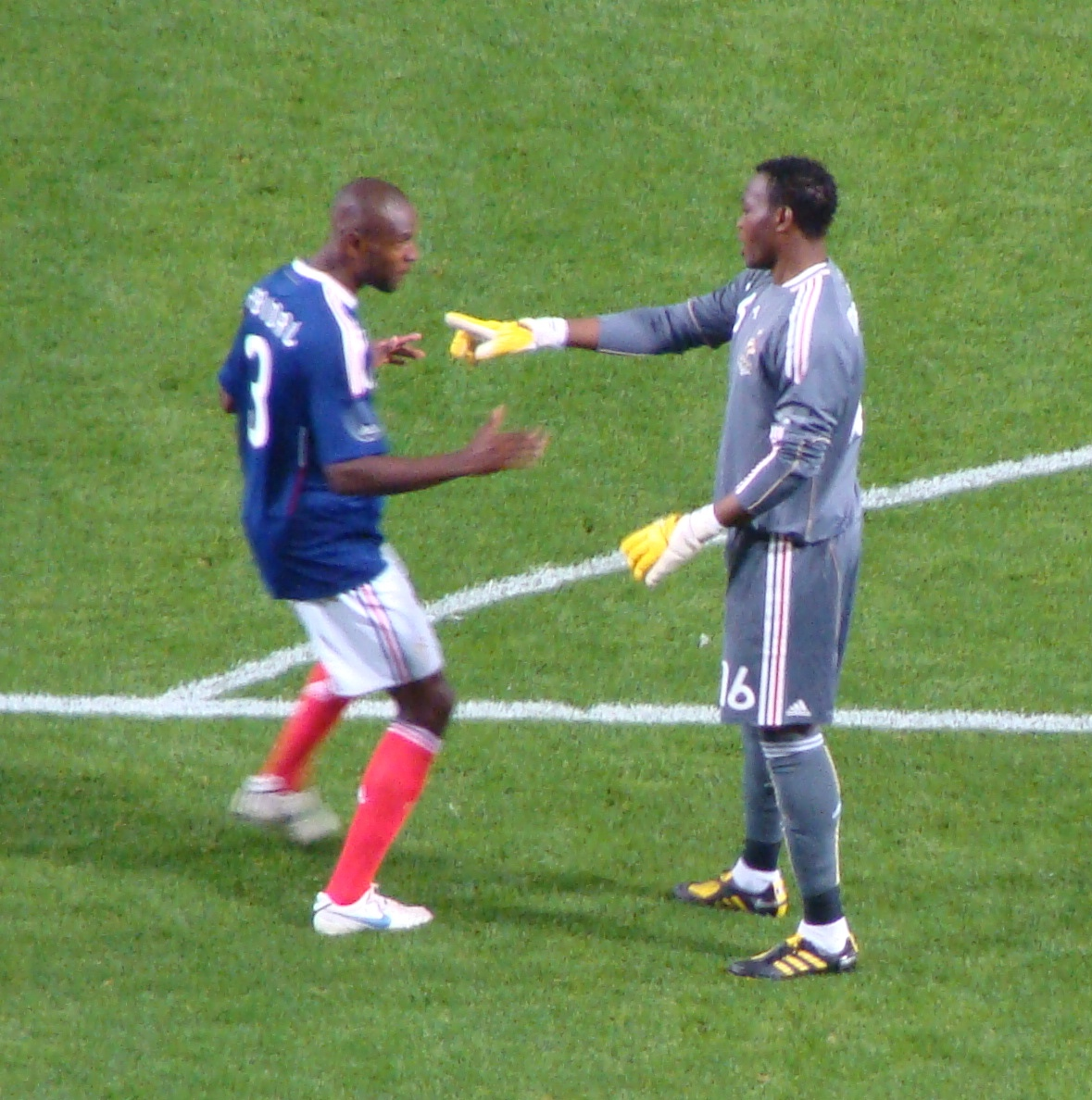
Eric Abidal and Mandanda (right) playing for France in 2010

Mandanda won a number of caps for the France national under-21 team and was named in the French squad for the 2006 UEFA European Under-21 Championship.

For the first time, in 2007, he took part in the French A-squad pre-selection.

He played in a friendly match with France B against Congo DR on 5 February 2008, in which he was substituted at half time, and his younger brother Parfait came on for Congo. He made his full international debut on 27 May 2008 in a 2–0 victory against Ecuador in a Euro 2008 warm-up friendly, coming on as a half-time substitute for Sébastien Frey, and was subsequently nominated as the third-choice goalkeeper in the French squad for the tournament in Austria and Switzerland.

He started the 2010 FIFA World Cup qualifying campaign as France's first-choice goalkeeper, making his competitive international debut on 6 September 2008 in their opening qualifier against Austria. However, he was replaced in the summer of 2009, as Raymond Domenech chose Olympique Lyonnais goalkeeper Hugo Lloris over him for the international starting eleven. Mandanda was a member of France's World Cup team, but did not appear in any of its three matches in the competition.

On 6 June 2011, Mandanda captained the French in a 4–1 friendly win away to Ukraine at the Donbas Arena. He was called up for UEFA Euro 2012 in Poland and Ukraine. Mandanda was originally named in the squad also for the 2014 FIFA World Cup, but sustained an injury before the tournament and was replaced by Stéphane Ruffier of AS Saint-Étienne. He was part of the squad that came runners-up at UEFA Euro 2016 on home soil. Mandanda was part of the 23-man France squad that won the 2018 FIFA World Cup in Russia. He played in their goalless final group game against Denmark, his debut tournament appearance, at the age of 33. In November 2022, he was named in the French squad for the 2022 FIFA World Cup in Qatar, where he started against Tunisia in the final group stage match. On 14 January 2023, Mandanda announced his retirement from international football.

== Style of play ==
An athletic and powerful goalkeeper, Mandanda was mainly known for his excellent reflexes and shot-stopping ability, which enabled him to produce spectacular saves, as well as his positioning, longevity, and leadership qualities. He was less effective at dealing with high balls, however, and also struggled with injuries throughout his career. Moreover, his penalty saving record was not particularly impressive throughout his career. In addition to his goalkeeping abilities, he was also considered to be composed in possession and comfortable with the ball at his feet, and often functioned as a sweeper-keeper due to his distribution and ball-playing ability. He was considered to be one of the best goalkeepers in the world in his prime, and is regarded as one of the greatest French goalkeepers of all time, as well as one of the best goalkeepers ever to play in Ligue 1.

== Personal life ==
Mandanda has three younger brothers, Parfait, Riffi, and Over, all of whom are goalkeepers. He enjoys spending time with his family in the city of Marseille, where he lives. He earned the nickname "Frenchie" amongst his relatives for having chosen to play for the France national team rather than Congo, his country of birth.

== Career statistics ==
=== Club ===
Appearances and goals by club, season and competition
Club	Season	League			National cup (Note: Include Coupe de France)		League cup (Note: Includes Coupe de la Ligue, EFL Cup)		Europe		Other		Total	
Club	Season	Division	Apps	Goals	Apps	Goals	Apps	Goals	Apps	Goals	Apps	Goals	Apps	Goals
Le Havre	2004–05	Ligue 2	0	0	1	0	0	0	—		—		1	0
Le Havre	2005–06	Ligue 2	30	0	0	0	2	0	—		—		32	0
Le Havre	2006–07	Ligue 2	37	0	1	0	1	0	—		—		39	0
Le Havre	Total		67	0	2	0	3	0	—		—		72	0
Marseille (loan)	2007–08	Ligue 1	34	0	2	0	2	0	10 (Note: Six appearances in UEFA Champions League, four appearances in UEFA Europa League)	0	—		48	0
Marseille	2008–09	Ligue 1	38	0	2	0	1	0	14 (Note: Eight appearances in UEFA Champions League, six appearances in UEFA Europa League)	0	—		55	0
Marseille	2009–10	Ligue 1	36	0	2	0	2	0	10	0	—		50	0
Marseille	2010–11	Ligue 1	38	0	0	0	3	0	8 (Note: Appearance(s) in UEFA Champions League)	0	1 (Note: Appearance in Trophée des Champions)	0	50	0
Marseille	2011–12	Ligue 1	38	0	2	0	2	0	9	0	1	0	52	0
Marseille	2012–13	Ligue 1	38	0	3	0	1	0	9 (Note: Appearance(s) in UEFA Europa League)	0	—		51	0
Marseille	2013–14	Ligue 1	38	0	1	0	2	0	6	0	—		47	0
Marseille	2014–15	Ligue 1	38	0	0	0	0	0	—		—		38	0
Marseille	2015–16	Ligue 1	36	0	6	0	0	0	8	0	—		50	0
Marseille	Total		334	0	18	0	13	0	74	0	2	0	441	0
Crystal Palace	2016–17	Premier League	9	0	0	0	1	0	—		—		10	0
Marseille	2017–18	Ligue 1	31	0	3	0	0	0	11	0	—		45	0
Marseille	2018–19	Ligue 1	31	0	1	0	1	0	1	0	—		34	0
Marseille	2019–20	Ligue 1	27	0	1	0	1	0	—		—		29	0
Marseille	2020–21	Ligue 1	37	0	0	0	—		6	0	1	0	44	0
Marseille	2021–22	Ligue 1	9	0	2	0	—		9 (Note: One appearance in UEFA Europa League, eight appearances in UEFA Europa Conference League)	0	—		20	0
Marseille	Total		135	0	7	0	2	0	27	0	1	0	172	0
Marseille	Marseille total		469	0	25	0	15	0	101	0	3	0	613	0
Rennes	2022–23	Ligue 1	34	0	1	0	—		7	0	—		42	0
Rennes	2023–24	Ligue 1	34	0	1	0	—		7	0	—		42	0
Rennes	2024–25	Ligue 1	18	0	0	0	—		—		—		18	0
Rennes	Total		86	0	2	0	—		14	0	—		102	0
Career total			631	0	29	0	19	0	115	0	3	0	797	0

=== International ===
Appearances and goals by national team and year
National team	Year	Apps	Goals
France	2008	3	0
France	2009	2	0
France	2010	8	0
France	2011	1	0
France	2012	1	0
France	2013	1	0
France	2014	3	0
France	2015	2	0
France	2016	3	0
France	2017	2	0
France	2018	2	0
France	2019	4	0
France	2020	2	0
France	2021	0	0
France	2022	1	0
Total		35	0

== Honours ==
Marseille

- Ligue 1: 2009–10
- Coupe de la Ligue: 2009–10, 2010–11, 2011–12
- Trophée des Champions: 2010, 2011
- UEFA Europa League runner-up: 2017–18

France

- FIFA World Cup: 2018; runner-up: 2022
- UEFA European Championship runner-up: 2016

Individual

- Toulon Tournament Best Goalkeeper: 2005
- UNFP Ligue 1 Player of the Month: February 2008, August 2008, September 2017.
- UNFP Ligue 1 Goalkeeper of the Year: 2007–08, 2010–11, 2014–15, 2015–16, 2017–18
- UNFP Ligue 1 Team of the Year: 2007–08, 2010–11, 2014–15, 2015–16, 2017–18
- Marseille Olympian of the Season: 2007–08, 2015–16
- Roazhon d'Or (Stade Rennais Player of the Season): 2022–23

Orders

- Knight of the Legion of Honour: 2018
