= Salim Ben Seghir =

French footballer (born 2003)

Personal information
- Date of birth: 24 February 2003 (age 23)
- Place of birth: Saint-Tropez, France
- Height: 1.78 m (5 ft 10 in)
- Position: Winger

Team information
- Current team: Lokeren
- Number: 21

Youth career
- 2009–2016: Cogolinois
- 2016–2020: Nice

Senior career*
Years	Team	Apps	(Gls)
2020–2021	Nice B	9	(3)
2020	Nice	1	(0)
2021–2024	Marseille B	25	(6)
2022–2024	Marseille	2	(0)
2023	→ Valenciennes (loan)	18	(0)
2023–2024	→ Xamax (loan)	21	(0)
2024–2026	Xamax	49	(6)
2026–	Lokeren	1	(0)

International career^{‡}
2019–2020	France U17	7	(1)
2021–2022	France U19	9	(0)
- * Club domestic league appearances and goals as of 20 September 2026 ‡ National team caps and goals as of 19:41, 28 December 2022 (UTC)

Salim Ben Seghir (born 24 February 2003) is a French professional footballer who plays for the Belgian Challenger Pro League club Lokeren.

== Club career ==
=== Nice ===
Ben Seghir made his professional debut for Nice in a 3–1 Ligue 1 loss to Dijon on 29 November 2020, coming on as a late-match substitute.

=== Marseille ===
On 22 June 2021, Ben Seghir signed a contract to join fellow Ligue 1 club Marseille.

=== Xamax ===
On 8 September 2023, Ben Seghir moved on loan to Xamax in Switzerland. A year later, on 9 September 2024, Ben Seghir returned to Xamax on a permanent basis.

== International career ==
Ben Seghir is a youth international for France, having represented the country at under-17 level.

== Personal life ==
Born in France, Ben Seghir is of Moroccan descent and holds both French and Moroccan nationalities. He is the older brother of fellow footballer Eliesse Ben Seghir.
