= Nassim Ahmed =

Footballer (born 2000)

Personal information
- Date of birth: 9 October 2000 (age 26)
- Place of birth: Marseille, France
- Height: 1.74 m (5 ft 9 in)
- Position: Left-back

Team information
- Current team: Toulon
- Number: 13

Youth career
- Air Bell
- 2013–2017: Marseille

Senior career*
Years	Team	Apps	(Gls)
2017–2023	Marseille II	83	(3)
2021–2022	→Sète (loan)	26	(0)
2023–2024	Martigues	2	(0)
2024–	Toulon	21	(0)

International career^{‡}
2025–	Comoros	4	(0)
- * Club domestic league appearances and goals as of 21:18, 28 November 2025 (UTC) ‡ National team caps and goals as of 21:18, 28 November 2025 (UTC)

Nassim Ahmed (born 9 October 2000) is a professional footballer who plays as a left-back for the Championnat National 1 club Toulon. Born in France, he plays for the Comoros national team.

== Club career ==
Ahmed is a product of the youth academies of the French clubs Air Bell and Marseille. He was promoted to Marseille's reserves in 2017, and signed a youth contract with the club on 16 February 2018. On 15 June 2020, he signed his first professional contract with Marseille until 2023. On 31 July 2021, he joined Sète on a year-long loan in the Championnat National. On 2 February 2024, he transferred to Martigues. On 13 August 2024, he transferred to Toulon in the Championnat National 2.

== International career ==
Born in France, Mohamed is of Comorian descent, and holds French and Comorian citizenship. He was called up to the senior Comoros national team for the 2025 FIFA Arab Cup.
