= List of French football transfers winter 2023–24 =

This is a list of French football transfers for the 2023–24 winter transfer window. Only transfers featuring Ligue 1 and Ligue 2 are listed.

== Ligue 1 ==
Note: Flags indicate national team as has been defined under FIFA eligibility rules. Players may hold more than one non-FIFA nationality.

=== Paris Saint-Germain ===
In:

No.	Pos.	Nation	Player
9	FW	POR	Gonçalo Ramos (from (Portugal) Benfica, previously on loan)
35	DF	BRA	Lucas Beraldo (from (Brazil) São Paulo)
—	MF	BRA	Gabriel Moscardo (from (Brazil) Corinthians)

Out:

No.	Pos.	Nation	Player
27	MF	ITA	Cher Ndour (on loan to (Portugal) Braga)
44	FW	FRA	Hugo Ekitike (on loan to (Germany) Eintracht Frankfurt)
—	MF	BRA	Gabriel Moscardo (on loan to (Brazil) Corinthians)
—	FW	FRA	Noha Lemina (on loan to (England) Wolverhampton Wanderers, previously on loan at (Italy) Sampdoria)

=== Lens ===
In:

No.	Pos.	Nation	Player
13	DF	ECU	Jhoanner Chávez (on loan from (Brazil) Bahia, previously on loan at (Ecuador) Independiente del Valle)

Out:

No.	Pos.	Nation	Player
1	GK	VEN	Wuilker Faríñez (to (Venezuela) Caracas)
15	FW	COL	Óscar Cortés (on loan to (Scotland) Rangers)
20	DF	FRA	Faitout Maouassa (loan return to (Belgium) Club Brugge)

=== Marseille ===
In:

No.	Pos.	Nation	Player
3	DF	FRA	Quentin Merlin (from Nantes)
6	DF	SUI	Ulisses Garcia (from (Switzerland) Young Boys)
14	FW	CMR	Faris Moumbagna (from (Norway) Bodø/Glimt)
17	MF	CMR	Jean Onana (on loan from (Turkey) Beşiktaş)

Out:

No.	Pos.	Nation	Player
9	FW	POR	Vitinha (on loan to (Italy) Genoa)
12	DF	BRA	Renan Lodi (to (Saudi Arabia) Al Hilal)
24	FW	CMR	François Mughe (on loan to Dunkerque)
—	MF	UKR	Ruslan Malinovskyi (to (Italy) Genoa, previously on loan)

=== Rennes ===
In:

No.	Pos.	Nation	Player
6	MF	NED	Azor Matusiwa (from Reims)
36	DF	GHA	Alidu Seidu (from Clermont)

Out:

No.	Pos.	Nation	Player
21	MF	SRB	Nemanja Matić (to Lyon)
22	DF	FRA	Lorenz Assignon (on loan to (England) Burnley)
38	DF	MAR	Mohamed Jaouab (to Amiens)
42	DF	FRA	Jérémy Jacquet (on loan to Clermont)

=== Lille ===
In:

No.	Pos.	Nation	Player
19	FW	POR	Tiago Morais (from (Portugal) Boavista)
24	FW	SRB	Andrej Ilić (from (Norway) Vålerenga)
28	DF	POR	Rafael Fernandes (from (Portugal) Arouca)

Out:

No.	Pos.	Nation	Player
3	DF	POR	Tiago Djaló (to (Italy) Juventus)
13	DF	ALG	Akim Zedadka (on loan to (Spain) Zaragoza)
26	FW	FRA	Alan Virginius (on loan to Clermont)

=== Monaco ===
In:

No.	Pos.	Nation	Player
5	DF	GER	Thilo Kehrer (on loan from (England) West Ham United)

Out:

No.	Pos.	Nation	Player
8	MF	BEL	Eliot Matazo (on loan to (Belgium) Antwerp)
9	FW	NED	Myron Boadu (on loan to (Netherlands) Twente)
34	DF	FRA	Chrislain Matsima (on loan to Clermont)
77	MF	POR	Gelson Martins (to (Greece) Olympiacos)

=== Lyon ===
In:

No.	Pos.	Nation	Player
9	FW	NGA	Gift Orban (from (Belgium) Gent)
11	FW	BEL	Malick Fofana (from (Belgium) Gent)
14	DF	BRA	Adryelson (from (Brazil) Botafogo)
17	FW	ALG	Saïd Benrahma (on loan from (England) West Ham United)
23	GK	BRA	Lucas Perri (from (Brazil) Botafogo)
25	MF	BEL	Orel Mangala (on loan from (England) Nottingham Forest)
31	MF	SRB	Nemanja Matić (from Rennes)

Out:

No.	Pos.	Nation	Player
11	FW	ZIM	Tino Kadewere (on loan to Nantes)
17	GK	FRA	Rémy Riou (to Paris FC)
19	FW	POR	Diego Moreira (loan return to (England) Chelsea)
29	DF	FRA	Mamadou Sarr (on loan to (Belgium) Molenbeek)
47	FW	BRA	Jeffinho (on loan to (Brazil) Botafogo)
80	MF	FRA	Skelly Alvero (on loan to (Germany) Werder Bremen)

=== Clermont ===
In:

No.	Pos.	Nation	Player
4	DF	FRA	Chrislain Matsima (on loan from Monaco)
26	FW	FRA	Alan Virginius (on loan from Lille)
97	DF	FRA	Jérémy Jacquet (on loan from Rennes)

Out:

No.	Pos.	Nation	Player
20	MF	MAR	Aïman Maurer (on loan to Dunkerque)
36	DF	GHA	Alidu Seidu (to Rennes)

=== Nice ===
In:

No.	Pos.	Nation	Player
2	DF	FRA	Valentin Rosier (on loan from (Turkey) Beşiktaş)
25	FW	FRA	Mohamed-Ali Cho (from (Spain) Real Sociedad)
31	GK	FRA	Maxime Dupé (from (Belgium) Anderlecht)

Out:

No.	Pos.	Nation	Player
20	DF	ALG	Youcef Atal (to (Turkey) Adana Demirspor)
31	GK	ITA	Salvatore Sirigu (to (Turkey) Fatih Karagümrük)
35	FW	ALG	Badredine Bouanani (on loan to Lorient)
37	MF	FRA	Reda Belahyane (to (Italy) Hellas Verona)
38	DF	MAR	Ayoub Amraoui (on loan to Amiens)
—	DF	BRA	Robson Bambu (on loan to (Portugal) Arouca, previously on loan at (Brazil) Vasco da Gama)

=== Lorient ===
In:

No.	Pos.	Nation	Player
6	MF	MAR	Imran Louza (on loan from (England) Watford)
7	MF	GRE	Panos Katseris (from (Italy) Catanzaro)
9	FW	CIV	Mohamed Bamba (from (Austria) Wolfsberg)
10	FW	ALG	Badredine Bouanani (on loan from Nice)
32	DF	GHA	Nathaniel Adjei (on loan from (Sweden) Hammarby)

Out:

No.	Pos.	Nation	Player
10	MF	FRA	Romain Faivre (loan return to (England) Bournemouth)
20	DF	GUI	Dembo Sylla (on loan to Rodez)
25	DF	FRA	Vincent Le Goff (retired)
26	FW	FRA	Pablo Pagis (on loan to Laval)
29	FW	MLI	Siriné Doucouré (on loan to Valenciennes)
93	FW	NOR	Joel Mvuka (on loan to (Switzerland) Young Boys)
77	FW	AUT	Adrian Grbić (on loan to (Switzerland) Luzern)

=== Reims ===
In:

No.	Pos.	Nation	Player
18	DF	ESP	Sergio Akieme (from (Spain) Almeria)
26	MF	FRA	Benjamin Stambouli (from (Turkey) Adana Demirspor)

Out:

No.	Pos.	Nation	Player
11	FW	FRA	Amine Salama (on loan to Caen)
19	DF	ENG	Josh Wilson-Esbrand (loan return to (England) Manchester City)
21	MF	NED	Azor Matusiwa (to Rennes)
41	DF	GUI	Ibrahim Diakité (on loan to (Switzerland) Stade Lausanne Ouchy)

=== Montpellier ===
In:

No.	Pos.	Nation	Player
5	DF	FRA	Modibo Sagnan (from (Netherlands) Utrecht)
23	FW	FRA	Yann Karamoh (on loan from (Italy) Torino)
36	DF	SUI	Silvan Hefti (on loan from (Italy) Genoa)
70	FW	FRA	Tanguy Coulibaly (free agent)

Out:

No.	Pos.	Nation	Player
14	DF	FRA	Maxime Estève (on loan to (England) Burnley)
20	FW	ALG	Yanis Guermouche (to (Greece) Iraklis)
23	FW	ITA	Kelvin Yeboah (loan return to (Italy) Genoa)

=== Toulouse ===
In:

No.	Pos.	Nation	Player
37	MF	FRA	Yann Gboho (on loan from (Belgium) Cercle Brugge)
80	FW	GAB	Shavy Babicka (from (Cyprus) Aris Limassol)

Out:

No.	Pos.	Nation	Player
14	FW	MAR	Yanis Begraoui (on loan to Pau FC)
18	DF	SWE	Oliver Zandén (on loan to (Denmark) Randers)
21	MF	BFA	Mamady Bangré (on loan to Troyes)
—	MF	FRA	Kléri Serber (on loan to (Bulgaria) Botev Vratsa)
—	GK	NOR	Kjetil Haug (on loan to (Norway) Bodø/Glimt, previously on loan at (Norway) Sarpsborg)
—	FW	BIH	Said Hamulić (on loan to (Russia) Lokomotiv Moscow, previously on loan at (Netherlands) Vitesse)

=== Brest ===
In:

No.	Pos.	Nation	Player
18	DF	FRA	Antoine Cartillier (on loan from Monaco U21)

Out:

No.	Pos.	Nation	Player
4	DF	MAR	Achraf Dari (on loan to (Belgium) Charleroi)
44	DF	FRA	Josué Escartin (on loan to Ajaccio)

=== Strasbourg ===
In:

No.	Pos.	Nation	Player
1	GK	FRA	Matthieu Dreyer (from Saint-Étienne)
8	MF	BRA	Andrey Santos (on loan from (England) Chelsea, previously on loan at (England) Nottingham Forest)
—	FW	SRB	Miloš Luković (from (Serbia) IMT)

Out:

No.	Pos.	Nation	Player
1	GK	BEL	Matz Sels (to (England) Nottingham Forest)
22	DF	FRA	Gerzino Nyamsi (to (Russia) Lokomotiv Moscow)
39	DF	FRA	Maxime Bastian (to Sochaux)
77	DF	UKR	Eduard Sobol (on loan to (Belgium) Genk)
—	FW	SRB	Miloš Luković (on loan to (Serbia) IMT)

=== Nantes ===
In:

No.	Pos.	Nation	Player
3	DF	FRA	Nicolas Cozza (on loan from (Germany) VfL Wolfsburg)
14	MF	SEN	Lamine Diack (from (Turkey) Ankaragücü, previously on loan)
15	FW	ZIM	Tino Kadewere (on loan from Lyon)
77	FW	CIV	Bénie Traoré (on loan from (England) Sheffield United)
98	DF	FRA	Kelvin Amian (from (Italy) Spezia)

Out:

No.	Pos.	Nation	Player
10	FW	BRA	Marquinhos (loan return to (England) Arsenal)
14	MF	SEN	Lamine Diack (on loan to (United States) Colorado Rapids)
18	DF	FRA	Ronaël Pierre-Gabriel (to (Croatia) Dinamo Zagreb)
20	MF	BRA	Adson (to (Brazil) Vasco da Gama)
26	DF	ALG	Jaouen Hadjam (to (Switzerland) Young Boys)
28	DF	FRA	Fabien Centonze (on loan to (Italy) Hellas Verona)
29	DF	FRA	Quentin Merlin (to Marseille)

=== Le Havre ===
In:

No.	Pos.	Nation	Player

Out:

No.	Pos.	Nation	Player
10	FW	MAR	Nabil Alioui (to (Turkey) Adana Demirspor)
15	FW	FRA	Kandet Diawara (on loan to Concarneau)
16	GK	CIV	Mohamed Koné (on loan to Dunkerque)
18	MF	CGO	Nolan Mbemba (to Grenoble)
45	FW	SEN	Issa Soumaré (on loan to Auxerre)
—	FW	MTN	Pape Ibnou Ba (to Concarneau, previously on loan)

=== Metz ===
In:

No.	Pos.	Nation	Player
10	FW	GEO	Georges Mikautadze (on loan from (Netherlands) Ajax)
11	FW	CMR	Didier Lamkel Zé (on loan from (Turkey) Hatayspor)

Out:

No.	Pos.	Nation	Player
9	FW	COL	Óscar Estupiñán (loan return to (England) Hull City)
11	FW	FRA	Simon Elisor (on loan to Troyes)
19	MF	CIV	Habib Maïga (to (Hungary) Ferencváros)
20	MF	BEL	Sami Lahssaini (on loan to (Belgium) La Louvière)
21	MF	CIV	Jean N'Guessan (to (United Arab Emirates) Al Wasl)
—	FW	ALB	Xhuliano Skuka (on loan to (Albania) Partizani, previously on loan at (Slovenia) Maribor)
—	FW	CMR	Morgan Bokele (on loan to Épinal)

== Ligue 2 ==
Note: Flags indicate national team as has been defined under FIFA eligibility rules. Players may hold more than one non-FIFA nationality.

=== Auxerre ===
In:

No.	Pos.	Nation	Player
22	FW	FRA	Tidiane Diawara (from Linas-Montlhéry)
75	FW	SEN	Issa Soumaré (on loan from Le Havre)

Out:

No.	Pos.	Nation	Player
28	FW	GUI	Ousmane Camara (on loan to Annecy)
—	MF	MAR	Hamza Sakhi (to (Australia) Melbourne City, previously on loan)

=== Ajaccio ===
In:

No.	Pos.	Nation	Player
18	FW	CGO	Christopher Ibayi (from Rouen)
19	FW	AUS	Al Hassan Toure (from (Turkey) Eyüpspor, previously on loan at (Turkey) Şanlıurfaspor)
29	MF	MAR	Hamza Sakhi (from (Australia) Melbourne City)
44	DF	FRA	Josué Escartin (on loan from Brest)

Out:

No.	Pos.	Nation	Player
8	MF	FRA	Vincent Marchetti (to Paris FC)
10	FW	MAR	Yacine Bammou (to (China) Guangxi Pingguo Haliao)
38	MF	ALG	Ivane Chegra (on loan to Cholet)

=== Troyes ===
In:

No.	Pos.	Nation	Player
4	DF	GHA	Emmanuel Ntim (on loan from Caen)
7	FW	BFA	Mamady Bangré (on loan from Toulouse)
14	FW	FRA	Simon Elisor (on loan from Metz)
30	GK	FRA	Zacharie Boucher (on loan from Bastia)

Out:

No.	Pos.	Nation	Player
26	FW	ALG	Noa Cervantes (on loan to Martigues)
34	FW	FRA	Alexis Lefebvre (on loan to Nancy)
39	MF	FRA	Derek Mazou-Sacko (on loan to Nancy)
—	DF	ECU	Jackson Porozo (on loan to (Turkey) Kasımpaşa, previously on loan at (Greece) Olympiacos)
—	FW	CAN	Iké Ugbo (on loan to (England) Sheffield Wednesday, previously on loan at (Wales) Cardiff City)

=== Angers ===
In:

No.	Pos.	Nation	Player
19	FW	FRA	Esteban Lepaul (from Épinal)

Out:

No.	Pos.	Nation	Player
4	DF	BIH	Halid Šabanović (on loan to Valenciennes)
24	FW	FRA	Jean-Mattéo Bahoya (to (Germany) Eintracht Frankfurt)

=== Bordeaux ===
In:

No.	Pos.	Nation	Player

Out:

No.	Pos.	Nation	Player
2	DF	NOR	Stian Rode Gregersen (to (United States) Atlanta United)
77	FW	SEN	Aliou Badji (on loan to (Turkey) Gaziantep)

=== Bastia ===
In:

No.	Pos.	Nation	Player
14	FW	FRA	Gaëtan Charbonnier (from Saint-Étienne)
21	DF	MAR	Mohamed Souboul (from (Morocco) Raja Casablanca)
24	DF	FRA	Tom Meynadier (from GOAL)
26	MF	FRA	Mahamé Siby (on loan from (Sweden) Malmö)

Out:

No.	Pos.	Nation	Player
1	GK	FRA	Zacharie Boucher (on loan to Troyes)
3	DF	FRA	Loup-Diwan Gueho (on loan to (Poland) Lechia Gdańsk)
27	DF	FRA	Romaric Yapi (to (Slovakia) DAC Dunajská Streda)
39	FW	FRA	Kapit Djoco (to Annecy)
91	FW	FRA	Sekou Lega (loan return to Lyon)
96	FW	FRA	Yohan Baï (to (Bulgaria) Lokomotiv Plovdiv)

=== Caen ===
In:

No.	Pos.	Nation	Player
15	FW	FRA	Amine Salama (on loan from Reims)

Out:

No.	Pos.	Nation	Player
8	MF	FRA	Yoann Court (free agent)
10	MF	CIV	Caleb Zady Sery (to (Serbia) Vojvodina)
28	MF	FRA	Djibril Diani (to (United States) Charlotte)
91	DF	GHA	Emmanuel Ntim (on loan to Troyes)
—	FW	FRA	Ilyes Najim (on loan to Cholet, previously on loan at Martigues)
—	FW	FRA	Samuel Essende (to (Portugal) Vizela, previously on loan)

=== Guingamp ===
In:

No.	Pos.	Nation	Player
22	MF	FRA	Victor Lobry (from Saint-Étienne)
—	FW	FRA	Ugo Bonnet (from Valenciennes)
—	MF	RSA	Lebogang Phiri (from (Turkey) Çaykur Rizespor)

Out:

No.	Pos.	Nation	Player
18	FW	FRA	Gaëtan Courtet (to Dunkerque)

=== Paris FC ===
In:

No.	Pos.	Nation	Player
1	GK	FRA	Rémy Riou (from Lyon)
2	DF	FIN	Tuomas Ollila (from (Finland) HJK)
4	MF	FRA	Vincent Marchetti (from Ajaccio)
12	FW	MLI	Nouha Dicko (from (Greece) OFI Crete)

Out:

No.	Pos.	Nation	Player
8	MF	FRA	Yohan Demoncy (to Annecy)
28	MF	FRA	Gabriel Oualengbe (on loan to Créteil)

=== Saint-Étienne ===
In:

No.	Pos.	Nation	Player
10	FW	FRA	Nathanaël Mbuku (on loan from (Germany) FC Augsburg)
11	FW	FRA	Irvin Cardona (on loan from (Germany) FC Augsburg)

Out:

No.	Pos.	Nation	Player
1	GK	FRA	Matthieu Dreyer (to Strasbourg)
10	FW	FRA	Gaëtan Charbonnier (to Bastia)
22	MF	FRA	Victor Lobry (to Guingamp)

=== Grenoble ===
In:

No.	Pos.	Nation	Player
3	DF	TUR	Efe Sarıkaya (from (Turkey) Altay)
31	MF	CGO	Nolan Mbemba (from Le Havre)

Out:

No.	Pos.	Nation	Player
12	FW	GAM	Lamine Jarjou (on loan to (Kazakhstan) Atyrau)
20	MF	FRA	Baptiste Isola (on loan to Mâcon)

=== Quevilly-Rouen ===
In:

No.	Pos.	Nation	Player
17	DF	FRA	Antoine Batisse (from Pau FC)
31	MF	FRA	Denis-Will Poha (on loan from (Switzerland) Sion)

Out:

No.	Pos.	Nation	Player
11	MF	CTA	Vénuste Baboula (on loan to Versailles)

=== Amiens ===
In:

No.	Pos.	Nation	Player
13	DF	MAR	Mohamed Jaouab (from Rennes)
—	DF	MAR	Ayoub Amraoui (on loan from Nice)
—	FW	FRA	Mounir Chouiar (on loan from (Bulgaria) Ludogorets)

Out:

No.	Pos.	Nation	Player
18	MF	SEN	Amadou Ciss (to (Turkey) Adanaspor)
32	FW	FRA	Darell Tokpa (to Guingamp B)
41	DF	CIV	Siriky Diabaté (to (Bulgaria) Botev Plovdiv)
94	FW	FRA	Mathis Touho (on loan to Le Mans)

=== Pau FC ===
In:

No.	Pos.	Nation	Player
9	FW	MAR	Yanis Begraoui (on loan from Toulouse)
12	DF	ANG	Jordy Gaspar (free agent)

Out:

No.	Pos.	Nation	Player
2	DF	FRA	Thérence Koudou (loan return to Reims)
17	DF	FRA	Antoine Batisse (to Quevilly-Rouen)
28	MF	FRA	Lenny Pirringuel (loan return to Bordeaux)

=== Rodez ===
In:

No.	Pos.	Nation	Player
11	DF	GUI	Dembo Sylla (on loan from Lorient)

Out:

No.	Pos.	Nation	Player
—	FW	FRA	Hatim Far (on loan to La Roche, previously on loan at Toulon)

=== Laval ===
In:

No.	Pos.	Nation	Player
29	FW	FRA	Pablo Pagis (on loan from Lorient)

Out:

No.	Pos.	Nation	Player
8	MF	FRA	Kevin Tapoko (free agent)

=== Valenciennes ===
In:

No.	Pos.	Nation	Player
2	DF	BIH	Halid Šabanović (on loan from Angers)
9	FW	MLI	Siriné Doucouré (on loan from Lorient)
90	FW	NGA	Mathias Oyewusi (from (Lithuania) Žalgiris)
96	FW	BRA	Flamarion (from (Georgia (country)) Dinamo Batumi)
—	MF	CMR	Jean-Eric Moursou (from (Cameroon) Coton Sport)

Out:

No.	Pos.	Nation	Player
7	MF	ALG	Sofiane Boudraa (on loan to Versailles)
9	FW	CMR	Marius Noubissi (to (Belgium) Patro Eisden)
11	FW	FRA	Ugo Bonnet (to Guingamp)
19	DF	FRA	Nassim Innocenti (to (Slovakia) Košice)
28	MF	POR	Bruno Costa (to (Portugal) Vizela)
35	FW	SEN	Ibrahima Diallo (loan return to (Turkey) Göztepe)
36	MF	FRA	Eyram Viegbe (on loan to Saint-Quentin)
39	DF	ANG	Jonathan Buatu (to (Portugal) Gil Vicente)

=== Annecy ===
In:

No.	Pos.	Nation	Player
7	FW	FRA	Kapit Djoco (from Bastia)
15	FW	FRA	Brian Beyer (from (Switzerland) Yverdon-Sport)
25	MF	FRA	Yohan Demoncy (from Paris FC)
27	FW	GUI	Ousmane Camara (on loan from Auxerre)

Out:

No.	Pos.	Nation	Player
27	FW	FRA	Steve Shamal (to (Turkey) Şanlıurfaspor)
29	FW	FRA	Zakaria Bengueddoudj (on loan to Châteauroux)

=== Concarneau ===
In:

No.	Pos.	Nation	Player
13	FW	CGO	Bevic Moussiti-Oko (from (Turkey) Boluspor)
14	FW	MTN	Pape Ibnou Ba (from Le Havre, previously on loan)
19	FW	FRA	Kandet Diawara (on loan from Le Havre)

Out:

No.	Pos.	Nation	Player

=== Dunkerque ===
In:

No.	Pos.	Nation	Player
2	DF	FRA	Alioune Ba (free agent)
3	DF	TOG	Loïc Bessilé (from (Belgium) Charleroi)
11	FW	CMR	François Mughe (on loan from Marseille)
18	FW	FRA	Gaëtan Courtet (from Guingamp)
23	DF	BEL	Bram Lagae (on loan from (Belgium) Gent)
30	GK	CIV	Mohamed Koné (on loan from Le Havre)
80	MF	FRA	Gessime Yassine (from Marignane)
92	MF	MAR	Aïman Maurer (on loan from Clermont)

Out:

No.	Pos.	Nation	Player
11	FW	FRA	Amadou Ba-Sy (to (Portugal) Vizela)
17	FW	CGO	Alain Ipiélé (to Martigues)
23	DF	FRA	Hugo Gambor (to (Belgium) Gent)
89	DF	FRA	Billy Koumetio (loan return to (England) Liverpool)

== See also ==
- 2023–24 Ligue 1
- 2023–24 Ligue 2
