= 2002–03 AC Perugia season =

Perugia
2002–03 season
- Chairman: Luciano Gaucci
- Manager: Serse Cosmi
- Serie A: 10th
- Coppa Italia: Semi-finals
- Top goalscorer: League: Fabrizio Miccoli (9); All: Fabrizio Miccoli (16)
Home colours

AC Perugia finished tenth in Serie A, and reached the semis of the Coppa Italia in a successful season by the club's standards.

The season started off with much negative publicity for club president Luciano Gaucci, when he decided to let South Korean striker Ahn Jung-Hwan go, following the Korean's winning goal against Italy in the FIFA World Cup.

In the season itself, Perugia fought in the middle of the table all year, but ended only four points above the dropzone, and in the end relied on inspired performances against top sides to seal the contract. Perugia's highlight of the season was a 4–1 victory against Inter, but it also beat Milan and drew at champions Juventus's home.

Its two most fancied players, Fabrizio Miccoli and Manuele Blasi were both bought by Juventus following the season, Miccoli being hailed as one of the season's major breakthroughs. Despite interest from top clubs, Perugia was able to keep right-back Zé Maria, who grew in importance during the season.

== Squad ==
=== Goalkeepers ===
- (Australia) Željko Kalac
- (Italy) Sebastiano Rossi
- (Italy) Michele Tardioli

=== Defenders ===
- (Brazil) Zé Maria
- (Italy) Marco Di Loreto
- (Italy) Mauro Milanese
- (Italy) Fabio Grosso
- (Italy) Sean Sogliano
- (Iran) Rahman Rezaei
- (Italy) William Viali
- (Greece) Konstantinos Loumpoutis

=== Midfielders ===
- (Nigeria) Christian Obodo
- (Italy) Manuele Blasi
- (Italy) Giovanni Tedesco
- (Italy) Massimiliano Fusani
- (Italy) Luigi Pagliuca
- (Italy) Roberto Baronio
- (Italy) Giovanni Sulcis
- (Italy) Fabio Gatti

=== Attackers ===
- (Italy) Fabrizio Miccoli
- (Greece) Zisis Vryzas
- (Italy) Andrea Caracciolo
- (Italy) Emanuele Berrettoni
- (Italy) Nicola Amoruso
- (Italy) Antonio Criniti
- (Italy) Lorenzo Crocetti

== Competitions ==
=== Serie A ===
==== League table ====
| Pos | Team | Pld | W | D | L | GF | GA | GD | Pts | Qualification or relegation |
|---|---|---|---|---|---|---|---|---|---|---|
| 8 | Roma (Note: Roma qualified for the first round of the 2003-04 UEFA Cup as Coppa Italia runner-up because the winner, Milan, qualified for Champions League through championship position.) | 34 | 13 | 10 | 11 | 55 | 46 | +9 | 49 | Qualification to UEFA Cup first round |
| 9 | Brescia | 34 | 9 | 15 | 10 | 36 | 38 | −2 | 42 (Note: Brescia finished ahead of Perugia on head-to-head points: Brescia 3–1 Perugia, Perugia 0–0 Brescia.) | Qualification to Intertoto Cup second round |
| 10 | Perugia (Note: Perugia gained entry to the 2003 UEFA Intertoto Cup after Chievo renounced; then they qualified to the 2003–04 UEFA Cup First round.) | 34 | 10 | 12 | 12 | 40 | 48 | −8 | 42 | Qualification to Intertoto Cup third round |
| 11 | Bologna | 34 | 10 | 11 | 13 | 39 | 47 | −8 | 41 | |
| 12 | Modena | 34 | 9 | 11 | 14 | 30 | 48 | −18 | 38 (Note: Modena finished ahead of Empoli, Atalanta and Reggina on head-to-head points: Modena: 10 pts, Empoli: 9 pts, Atalanta: 7 pts, Reggina: 5 pts.) | |

Source: 2002–03 Serie A, Soccerway
Rules for classification: 1) Points; 2) Head-to-head points; 3) Head-to-head goal difference; 4) Goal difference; 5) Goals scored; 6) Draw. (Note: Head-to-head record is used only after all the matches between the teams in question have been played).

==== Matches ====
| 2 | Perugia | 2–0 | Reggina | Perugia |
| | Miccoli 51'; Tedesco 80' | | | Stadium: Stadio Renato Curi |

| 3 | Milan | 3–0 | Perugia |
| | Maldini 40'; Inzaghi 50'; Seedorf 65' |

| 4 | Perugia | 1–3 | Empoli | Perugia |
| | Rezaei 8' | | Saudati 20'; Di Natale 42'; Rocchi 65' | Stadium: Stadio Renato Curi |

| 5 | Parma | 2–2 | Perugia |
| | Mutu 20'; Donati 53' | | Tedesco 64', 72' |

| 6 | Lazio | 3–0 | Perugia |
| | Inzaghi 11'; Chiesa 84'; Chiesa 90+1' |

| 7 | Perugia | 2–0 | Modena | Perugia |
| | Zé Maria 6', pen.' Rezaei 29' | | | Stadium: Stadio Renato Curi |

| 8 | Roma | 2–2 | Perugia |
| | Panucci 67'; Totti 71' | | Zé Maria 39' (pen.); Miccoli 43' |

| 1 | Chievo | 3–0 | Perugia |
| | Legrottaglie 25'; Della Morte 28'; Corini 52' (pen.) |

| 9 | Perugia | 2–1 | Torino | Perugia |
| | Caracciolo 38'; Zé Maria 87' (pen.) | | Ferrante 81' | Stadium: Stadio Renato Curi |

| 10 | Bologna | 2–1 | Perugia |
| | Julio Cruz 30'; Signori 37' | | Caracciolo 45' |

| 11 | Perugia | 3–0 | Como | Perugia |
| | Fusani 14'; Miccoli 47'; Milanese 90+4' | | | Stadium: Stadio Renato Curi |

| 12 | Atalanta | 0–2 | Perugia |
| | | | Miccoli 21'; Fusani 79' |

| 13 | Perugia | 0–0 | Piacenza | Perugia |
| | | | | Stadium: Stadio Renato Curi |

| 14 | Brescia | 3–1 | Perugia |
| | Tare 23', 39'; Baggio 88' (pen.) | | Miccoli 63' |

| 15 | Perugia | 0–1 | Juventus | Perugia |
| | | | Camoranesi 90+1' | Stadium: Stadio Renato Curi |

| 16 | Udinese | 0–0 | Perugia |

| 17 | Perugia | 4–1 | Internazionale | Perugia |
| | Zé Maria 9' (pen.); Vryzas 34', 63'; Fusani 55' | | Vieri 79' (pen.) | Stadium: Stadio Renato Curi |

| 18 | Perugia | 1–0 | Chievo | Perugia |
| | Di Loreto 39' | | | Stadium: Stadio Renato Curi |

| 19 | Reggina | 3–1 | Perugia |
| | Di Michele 1'; Cozza 27'; Bonazzoli 47' | | Rezaei 2' |

| 20 | Perugia | 1–0 | Milan | Perugia |
| | Miccoli 36' | | | Stadium: Stadio Renato Curi |

| 21 | Empoli | 1–1 | Perugia |
| | Carparelli 7' | | Vryzas 5' |

| 22 | Perugia | 1–2 | Parma | Perugia |
| | Grosso 51' | | Adriano 30'; Ferrari 72' | Stadium: Stadio Renato Curi |

| 23 | Perugia | 2–2 | Lazio | Perugia |
| | Zé Maria 13' (pen.); Grosso 43' | | Corradi 16'; Negro 85' | Stadium: Stadio Renato Curi |

| 24 | Modena | 1–1 | Perugia |
| | Colucci 14' | | Vryzas 34' |

| 25 | Perugia | 1–0 | Roma | Perugia |
| | Miccoli 52' | | | Stadium: Stadio Renato Curi |

| 26 | Torino | 2–1 | Perugia |
| | Ferrante 65', 79' | | Grosso 41' |

| 27 | Perugia | 1–1 | Bologna | Perugia |
| | Vryzas 33' | | Signori 68' | Stadium: Stadio Renato Curi |

| 28 | Como | 1–1 | Perugia |
| | Amoruso 30' | | Miccoli 90+1' |

| 29 | Perugia | 1–0 | Atalanta | Perugia |
| | Pagliuca 78' | | | Stadium: Stadio Renato Curi |

| 30 | Piacenza | 5–1 | Perugia |
| | Di Francesco 5'; Hugo Campagnaro 36', 63'; Hübner 41'; Ferrarese 80' | | Zé Maria 50' |

| 31 | Perugia | 0–0 | Brescia | Perugia |
| | | | | Stadium: Stadio Renato Curi |

| 32 | Juventus | 2–2 | Perugia |
| | Trezeguet 25' (pen.); Di Vaio 46' | | Miccoli 36'; Grosso 90+1' |

| 33 | Perugia | 0–2 | Udinese | Perugia |
| | | | Jankulovski 60'; Jørgensen 87' | Stadium: Stadio Renato Curi |

| 34 | Internazionale | 2–2 | Perugia |
| | Crespo 10', 56' | | Obodo 46'; Di Loreto 89' |

==== Top scorers ====
- (Italy) Fabrizio Miccoli 9
- (Brazil) Zé Maria 6
- (Greece) Zisis Vryzas 5
- (Italy) Fabio Grosso 4
- (Italy) Giovanni Tedesco 3
