= 2023–24 Olympique de Marseille season =

Olympique de Marseille
2023–24 season
- President: Pablo Longoria
- Head coach: Marcelino (until 20 September); Jacques Abardonado (caretaker, from 20 to 27 September); Gennaro Gattuso (from 27 September to 19 February); Jean-Louis Gasset (from 20 February)
- Stadium: Stade Vélodrome
- Ligue 1: 8th
- Coupe de France: Round of 32
- UEFA Champions League: Third qualifying round
- UEFA Europa League: Semi-finals
- Top goalscorer: League: Pierre-Emerick Aubameyang (17); All: Pierre-Emerick Aubameyang (30)
Home colours	Away colours	Third colours

The 2023–24 season was the 118th season in the history of Olympique de Marseille and their 28th consecutive season in the top flight. The club participated in Ligue 1, the Coupe de France, the UEFA Champions League and the UEFA Europa League. The season covers the period from 1 July 2023 to 30 June 2024. Olympique de Marseille drew an average home attendance of 60,799 in 19 home games in the 2023–24 league season.

== Players ==
=== First-team squad ===
As of 1 February 2024

Note: Flags indicate national team as defined under FIFA eligibility rules; some limited exceptions apply. Players may hold more than one non-FIFA nationality.

No.	Pos.	Nation	Player
1	GK	CMR	Simon Ngapandouetnbu
3	DF	FRA	Quentin Merlin
4	DF	FRA	Samuel Gigot (vice-captain)
5	DF	ARG	Leonardo Balerdi
6	DF	SUI	Ulisses Garcia
7	DF	FRA	Jonathan Clauss
8	MF	MAR	Azzedine Ounahi
10	FW	GAB	Pierre-Emerick Aubameyang
11	MF	MAR	Amine Harit
14	FW	CMR	Faris Moumbagna
16	GK	ESP	Pau López
17	MF	CMR	Jean Onana (on loan from Beşiktaş)
18	DF	CIV	Bamo Meïté (on loan from Lorient)

No.	Pos.	Nation	Player
19	MF	CAF	Geoffrey Kondogbia (3rd captain)
20	FW	ARG	Joaquín Correa (on loan from Inter Milan)
21	MF	FRA	Valentin Rongier (captain)
22	MF	SEN	Pape Gueye
23	FW	SEN	Ismaïla Sarr
27	MF	FRA	Jordan Veretout
29	FW	SEN	Iliman Ndiaye
34	MF	MAR	Bilal Nadir
36	GK	ESP	Rubén Blanco
37	MF	ENG	Emran Soglo
44	FW	BRA	Luis Henrique
62	DF	PAN	Michael Amir Murillo
99	DF	COD	Chancel Mbemba

== Transfers ==
=== In ===
No.	Pos.	Player	Transferred from	Fee	Date	Source
19	MF	(Central African Republic) Geoffrey Kondogbia	(Spain) Atlético Madrid	€8M	30 June 2023	
12	DF	(Brazil) Renan Lodi	(Spain) Atlético Madrid	€13M	14 July 2023	
10	FW	(Gabon) Pierre-Emerick Aubameyang	(England) Chelsea	Free	21 July 2023	
23	FW	(Senegal) Ismaïla Sarr	(England) Watford	€17M	24 July 2023	
36	GK	(Spain) Rubén Blanco	(Spain) Celta Vigo	€2M	30 July 2023	
29	FW	(Senegal) Iliman Ndiaye	(England) Sheffield Utd	€22M	1 August 2023	
20	FW	(Argentina) Joaquín Correa	(Italy) Inter Milan	Loan	25 August 2023	
62	DF	(Panama) Michael Amir Murillo	(Belgium) Anderlecht	€2.5M	30 August 2023	
18	DF	(Ivory Coast) Bamo Meïté	(France) Lorient	Loan	1 September 2023	
17	MF	(Cameroon) Jean Onana	(Turkey) Beşiktaş	Loan	8 January 2024	
6	DF	(Switzerland) Ulisses Garcia	(Switzerland) Young Boys	€3M	16 January 2024	
14	FW	(Cameroon) Faris Moumbagna	(Norway) Bodø/Glimt	€8M	20 January 2024	
3	DF	(France) Quentin Merlin	(France) Nantes	€12M	26 January 2024	

Total expenditure: ▼€87.5 million (excluding any other fees)

=== Out ===
No.	Pos.	Player	Transferred to	Fee	Date	Source
3	DF	(Ivory Coast) Eric Bailly	(England) Manchester United	Loan return	1 July 2023	
29	DF	(Burkina Faso) Issa Kaboré	(England) Manchester City	Loan return	1 July 2023	
30	DF	(Portugal) Nuno Tavares	(England) Arsenal	Loan return	1 July 2023	
	FW	(Poland) Arkadiusz Milik	(Italy) Juventus	€6.3M	1 July 2023	
	FW	(Colombia) Luis Suárez	(Spain) Almería	€8M	1 July 2023	
10	MF	(France) Dimitri Payet	(Brazil) Vasco da Gama	Released	1 July 2023	
7	MF	(Serbia) Nemanja Radonjić	(Italy) Torino	€1.7M	1 July 2023	
6	MF	(Netherlands) Kevin Strootman	(Italy) Genoa	Free	6 July 2023	
23	DF	(Bosnia and Herzegovina) Sead Kolašinac	(Italy) Atalanta	Free	6 July 2023	
47	MF	(Turkey) Bartuğ Elmaz	(Turkey) Fenerbahçe	€1.2M	20 July 2023	
20	FW	(United States) Konrad de la Fuente	(Spain) Eibar	Loan	9 August 2023	
17	FW	(Turkey) Cengiz Ünder	(Turkey) Fenerbahçe	€15M	13 August 2023	
18	MF	(Ukraine) Ruslan Malinovskyi	(Italy) Genoa	Loan	18 August 2023	
70	FW	(Chile) Alexis Sánchez	(Italy) Inter Milan	Free	26 August 2023	
	DF	(Spain) Pol Lirola	(Italy) Frosinone	Loan	28 August 2023	
6	MF	(France) Matteo Guendouzi	(Italy) Lazio	Loan	31 August 2023	
18	DF	(France) Jordan Amavi	(France) Brest	Loan	31 August 2023	
95	DF	(France) Isaak Touré	(France) Lorient	Undisclosed	1 September 2023	
32	FW	(France) Salim Ben Seghir	(Switzerland) Xamax	Loan	8 September 2023	
12	DF	(Brazil) Renan Lodi	(Saudi Arabia) Al-Hilal	€23M	17 January 2024	
	MF	(Ukraine) Ruslan Malinovskyi	(Italy) Genoa	€10M	31 January 2024	
9	FW	(Portugal) Vitinha	(Italy) Genoa	Loan	1 February 2024	
24	FW	(Cameroon) François Mughe	(France) Dunkerque	Loan	1 February 2024	

Total income: ▲€65.2 million (excluding add-ons, bonuses and undisclosed figures)

== Pre-season and friendlies ==
Win Draw Loss Fixtures

15 July 2023 Friendly	Marseille	2–0	Nîmes	Marseille, France
18:30 CEST (UTC+2)	Vitinha 49', 70'	Report		Stadium: La Commanderie; Attendance: 0

22 July 2023 Friendly	Eupen	1–0	Marseille	Germany
11:00 CEST (UTC+2)	Baiye 12'

27 July 2023 Friendly	RKC Waalwijk	0–1	Marseille	Germany
13:00 CEST (UTC+2)		Report	Gueye 13'

2 August 2023 Friendly	Marseille	1–2	Bayer Leverkusen	Marseille, France
20:45 CEST (UTC+2)	Touré (yellow card) 71'; Mughe 79'	Report	Tah 15'; Amiri 40'; Münz (yellow card) 64'	Stadium: Stade Vélodrome; Referee: Gaël Angoula (France)

== Competitions ==
=== Overall record ===
Competition	First match	Last match	Starting round	Final position	Record							
Competition	First match	Last match	Starting round	Final position	Pld	W	D	L	GF	GA	GD	Win %
Ligue 1	12 August 2023	19 May 2024	Matchday 1	8th	34	13	11	10	52	41	+11	38.24
Coupe de France	7 January 2024	21 January 2024	Round of 64	Round of 32	2	1	1	0	2	1	+1	50.00
UEFA Champions League	9 August 2023	15 August 2023	Third qualifying round	Third qualifying round	2	1	0	1	2	2	+0	50.00
UEFA Europa League	21 September 2023	9 May 2024	Group stage	Semi-finals	14	6	4	4	27	22	+5	42.86
Total					52	21	16	15	83	66	+17	40.38

Source: Soccerway

=== Ligue 1 ===
==== League table ====
Pos	Team	Pld	W	D	L	GF	GA	GD	Pts	Qualification or relegation
6	Lyon	34	16	5	13	49	55	−6	53	Qualification for the Europa League league phase (Note: Since the 2023–24 Coupe de France winners, Paris Saint-Germain, qualified for the Champions League via league position, the Europa League berth awarded to the cup winners was passed to the sixth-placed team and the Conference League berth was passed to the seventh-placed team.)
7	Lens	34	14	9	11	45	37	+8	51	Qualification for the Conference League play-off round
8	Marseille	34	13	11	10	52	41	+11	50	
9	Reims	34	13	8	13	42	47	−5	47	
10	Rennes	34	12	10	12	53	46	+7	46	

Source: Ligue 1
Rules for classification: 1) Points; 2) Goal difference; 3) Head-to-head points; 4) Head-to-head goal difference; 5) Head-to-head goals scored; 6) Head-to-head away goals scored; 7) Goals scored; 8) Away goals scored; 9) Fair-play points (Note: Head-to-head record is used only after all the matches between the teams in question have been played).

==== Results summary ====
Overall								Home						Away					
Pld	W	D	L	GF	GA	GD	Pts	W	D	L	GF	GA	GD	W	D	L	GF	GA	GD
34	13	11	10	52	41	+11	50	10	5	1	29	11	+18	3	6	9	23	30	−7

Source: Ligue 1

==== Results by round ====
Round	1	2	3	4	5	6	7	8	9	10	11	12	13	14	15	16	17	18	19	20	21	22	23	24	25	26	27	28	29	30	31	32	33	34
Ground	H	A	H	A	H	A	A	H	A	H	H	A	A	H	A	H	A	H	H	A	H	A	H	A	H	A	H	A	H	A	H	A	H	A
Result	W	D	W	D	D	L	L	W	L	W	D	L	D	W	W	W	D	D	D	L	D	L	W	W	W	L	L	L	D	D	W	L	W	W
Position	4	6	2	3	3	8	12	6	8	9	9	10	12	9	6	6	6	7	7	8	8	9	9	7	7	7	7	8	8	9	7	9	8	8

Source: Ligue 1
A = Away; H = Home; W = Win; D = Draw; L = Loss

==== Matches ====
The league fixtures were announced on 29 June 2023.

12 August 2023 1	Marseille	2–1	Reims	Marseille
17:00 CEST (UTC+2)	Ounahi 23'; Lodi (yellow card) 59'; Vitinha 73'	Report	Itō 10'; Munetsi (yellow card) 36'; Wilson-Esbrand (yellow card) 45+3'; Richardson (yellow card) 57'	Stadium: Stade Vélodrome; Attendance: 63,787; Referee: Eric Wattellier

18 August 2023 2	Metz	2–2	Marseille	Longeville-lès-Metz
21:00 CEST (UTC+2)	N'Doram (yellow card) 9'; Lô (red card) 59'; Sabaly 65'; Mikautadze 71'; Mbaye (yellow card) 90'; Oukidja (yellow card) 90+8'	Report	Soglo 14'; Lodi (yellow card) 49'; Vitinha 82'; Veretout (yellow card) 85'	Stadium: Stade Saint-Symphorien; Attendance: 26,661; Referee: Jérôme Brisard

26 August 2023 3	Marseille	2–0	Brest	Marseille
17:00 CEST (UTC+2)	Mbemba 4'; Sarr 65'	Report	Satriano (yellow card) 74'	Stadium: Stade Vélodrome; Attendance: 63,592; Referee: Jérémy Stinat

1 September 2023 4	Nantes	1–1	Marseille	Nantes
21:00 CEST (UTC+2)	Meupiyou (red card) 9'; Mohamed 39'	Report	Sarr 4'; Aubameyang (yellow card) 26'; Rongier (yellow card) 70'	Stadium: Stade de la Beaujoire; Attendance: 34,600; Referee: Ruddy Buquet

17 September 2023 5	Marseille	0–0	Toulouse	Marseille
17:05 CEST (UTC+2)	Correa (yellow card) 64'; Harit (yellow card) 89'	Report	Schmidt (yellow card) 4'; Desler (yellow card) 45'; Magri (yellow card) 77'; Restes (yellow card) 79'; Bangré (yellow card) 90+5'	Stadium: Stade Vélodrome; Attendance: 63,477; Referee: François Letexier

24 September 2023 6	Paris Saint-Germain	4–0	Marseille	Paris
20:45 CEST (UTC+2)	Hakimi 8'; Kolo Muani 37'; Ramos 47', 89'	Report	Gigot (yellow card) 73'; Veretout (yellow card) 82'; Lodi (yellow card) 85'	Stadium: Parc des Princes; Attendance: 47,926; Referee: Willy Delajod

30 September 2023 7	Monaco	3–2	Marseille	Monaco
21:00 CEST (UTC+2)	Akliouche 8', 52'; Balogun 23'; Fofana (yellow card) 42'; Zakaria (yellow card) 59'; Matazo (yellow card) 77'; Magassa (yellow card) 90+2'	Report	Ndiaye 1'; Gigot 18', (yellow card) 59'; Correa (yellow card) 54'; Clauss (yellow card) 73'; Rongier (yellow card) 77'	Stadium: Stade Louis II; Attendance: 9,912; Referee: Benoît Bastien

8 October 2023 8	Marseille	3–0	Le Havre	Marseille
13:00 CEST (UTC+2)	Sangante 18' (o.g.); Aubameyang 21'; Sarr 84'	Report	Ndiaye (yellow card) 12' (yellow-red card) 40'; Casimir (yellow card) 51'	Stadium: Stade Vélodrome; Attendance: 63,576; Referee: Thomas Léonard

21 October 2023 9	Nice	1–0	Marseille	Nice
21:00 CEST (UTC+2)	Dante (yellow card) 15'; Boga (yellow card) 24'; Boudaoui (yellow card) 56'; Moffi (yellow card) 79'; Guessand 80'	Report	Balerdi (yellow card) 75' (yellow-red card) 78'; Murillo (yellow card) 90+5'	Stadium: Allianz Riviera; Attendance: 31,423; Referee: Ruddy Buquet

4 November 2023 11	Marseille	0–0	Lille	Marseille
21:00 CET (UTC+1)	Harit (yellow card) 42'; Gigot (yellow card) 53'	Report	André (yellow card) 27'; Bentaleb (yellow card) 70'; Yazıcı (yellow card) 73'	Stadium: Stade Vélodrome; Attendance: 63,674; Referee: Stéphanie Frappart

12 November 2023 12	Lens	1–0	Marseille	Lens
20:45 CET (UTC+1)	Gradit (yellow card) 44', (goal) 90'; Abdul Samed (yellow card) 76'	Report	Lodi (yellow card) 37'; Vitinha (yellow card) 45+2'	Stadium: Stade Bollaert-Delelis; Attendance: 38,223; Referee: Benoît Bastien

25 November 2023 13	Strasbourg	1–1	Marseille	Strasbourg
21:00 CET (UTC+1)	Emegha 6'; Bakwa (yellow card) 89'	Report	Clauss 27'; Lodi (yellow card) 54'; Veretout (yellow card) 90+1'	Stadium: Stade de la Meinau; Attendance: 25,443; Referee: Jérôme Brisard

3 December 2023 14	Marseille	2–0	Rennes	Marseille
20:45 CET (UTC+1)	Aubameyang 10' (pen.); Ounahi 65'; Ndiaye (red card) 68'; Mughe (yellow card) 81'	Report	Santamaria (yellow card) 36'; Wooh (red card) 61'; Matić (yellow card) 76'; Gouiri (yellow card) 90'	Stadium: Stade Vélodrome; Attendance: 54,162; Referee: Willy Delajod

6 December 2023 10	Marseille	3–0	Lyon	Marseille
21:00 CET (UTC+1)	Vitinha 21'; Murillo 25'; Ounahi (yellow card) 49'; Aubameyang 55'	Report	Lovren (yellow card) 21'; Diawara (yellow card) 87'	Stadium: Stade Vélodrome; Attendance: 54,238; Referee: François Letexier
Note: The match was originally scheduled for 29 October 2023, but was postponed after the Lyon team bus was attacked by projectiles and head coach Fabio Grosso was injured.

10 December 2023 15	Lorient	2–4	Marseille	Lorient
20:45 CET (UTC+1)	Le Goff (yellow card) 14'; B. Mendy (yellow card) 16', (goal) 52'; Faivre 41'; Laporte (yellow card) 45+3'; Innocent (yellow card) 62'; F. Mendy (yellow card) 71'	Report	Mbemba 3'; Aubameyang 9', 42'; Balerdi (yellow card) 21', (goal) 33'; Lodi (yellow card) 57'; Gigot (yellow card) 59'; Clauss (red card) 80'	Stadium: Stade du Moustoir; Attendance: 15,848; Referee: Eric Wattellier

17 December 2023 16	Marseille	2–1	Clermont	Marseille
17:05 CET (UTC+1)	Murillo 26'; Harit 42'	Report	Allevinah 58'; Seidu (yellow card) 67'; Caufriez (yellow card) 88'	Stadium: Stade Vélodrome; Attendance: 63,751; Referee: Gaël Angoula

20 December 2023 17	Montpellier	1–1	Marseille	Montpellier
21:00 CET (UTC+1)	Fayad 14'; Jullien (yellow card) 44'; Savanier (yellow card) 90+4'	Report	Veretout 52'; Gigot (yellow card) 55'	Stadium: Stade de la Mosson; Attendance: 18,565; Referee: Thomas Léonard

12 January 2024 18	Marseille	1–1	Strasbourg	Marseille
21:00 CET (UTC+1)	Gigot 3', (yellow card) 90+5'; Meïté (yellow card) 34'; Nadir (yellow card) 84'	Report	Senaya (yellow card) 77'; Sebas 90+2'; Doukouré (yellow card) 90+5'	Stadium: Stade Vélodrome; Attendance: 53,616; Referee: Marc Bollengier

27 January 2024 19	Marseille	2–2	Monaco	Marseille
21:00 CET (UTC+1)	Aubameyang 38'; Balerdi 50'; Soglo (yellow card) 76'	Report	Ben Yedder 7'; Maripán (red card) 11'; Akliouche 45+4'; Zakaria (yellow card) 75' (yellow-red card) 86'; Kehrer (yellow card) 82'	Stadium: Stade Vélodrome; Attendance: 63,029; Referee: Willy Delajod

4 February 2024 20	Lyon	1–0	Marseille	Décines-Charpieu
20:45 CET (UTC+1)	Lacazette 37'; O'Brien (yellow card) 40'; Matić (yellow card) 61'	Report	Ounahi (yellow card) 75'	Stadium: Parc Olympique Lyonnais; Attendance: 46,380; Referee: Benoît Bastien

9 February 2024 21	Marseille	1–1	Metz	Marseille
21:00 CET (UTC+1)	Gigot (red card) 31'; Moumbagna 56'; Onana (yellow card) 82'; Clauss (yellow card) 88'	Report	Udol 61'	Stadium: Stade Vélodrome; Attendance: 62,686; Referee: Hakim Ben El Hadj

18 February 2024 22	Brest	1–0	Marseille	Brest
20:45 CET (UTC+1)	Lala (yellow card) 12'; Chardonnet (yellow card) 35'; Mounié (red card) 60'; Lees-Melou 88'; Le Cardinal (yellow card) 90+5'	Report	Balerdi (yellow card) 49'	Stadium: Stade Francis-Le Blé; Attendance: 14,766; Referee: Ruddy Buquet

25 February 2024 23	Marseille	4–1	Montpellier	Marseille
20:45 CET (UTC+1)	Ndiaye 31'; Aubameyang (yellow card) 32', (goal) 43', 62' (pen.); Harit (yellow card) 65'; Sacko 82' (o.g.)	Report	Al-Tamari 5'; Sylla (yellow card) 32'; Hefti (yellow card) 48'; Sagnan (yellow card) 75'; Kouyaté (yellow card) 86'	Stadium: Stade Vélodrome; Attendance: 61,263; Referee: Jérémie Pignard

2 March 2024 24	Clermont	1–5	Marseille	Clermont-Ferrand
21:00 CET (UTC+1)	Cham (yellow card) 34'; Borges (yellow card) 45+1'; Boutobba 53'	Report	Ndiaye 23'; Aubameyang 59'; Clauss 67'; Kondogbia (yellow card) 68'; Luis Henrique 80'; Moumbagna 90+2'	Stadium: Stade Gabriel Montpied; Attendance: 10,592; Referee: Thomas Léonard

10 March 2024 25	Marseille	2–0	Nantes	Marseille
20:45 CET (UTC+1)	Aubameyang 17', 79', (yellow card) 74'; Mbemba (yellow card) 90+2'	Report	Douglas Augusto (yellow card) 27'; Amian (yellow card) 45+2'; Sissoko (yellow card) 90+6'	Stadium: Stade Vélodrome; Attendance: 56,958; Referee: François Letexier

17 March 2024 26	Rennes	2–0	Marseille	Rennes
17:05 CET (UTC+1)	Terrier 21'; Kalimuendo (yellow card) 77'; Bourigeaud 78' (pen.)	Report	Harit (yellow card) 38'; López (yellow card) 77'; Sarr (yellow card) 80'	Stadium: Roazhon Park; Attendance: 28,610; Referee: Eric Wattellier

31 March 2024 27	Marseille	0–2	Paris Saint-Germain	Marseille
20:45 CEST (UTC+2)		Report	Beraldo (yellow card) 15', (red card) 40'; Hernandez (yellow card) 38'; Pereira (yellow card) 40'; Donnarumma (yellow card) 45'; Vitinha 53'; Ramos 85'	Stadium: Stade Vélodrome; Attendance: 66,046; Referee: Benoît Bastien

5 April 2024 28	Lille	3–1	Marseille	Villeneuve-d'Ascq
21:00 CEST (UTC+2)	Santos (yellow card) 21'; David 54' (pen.); Cabella 71'; Gudmundsson 84'	Report	Harit (yellow card) 27'; Gigot (yellow card) 52'; Merlin (yellow card) 57'; Kondogbia (yellow card) 70'; Balerdi (yellow card) 77'; Ismaily 81' (o.g.); Veretout (yellow card) 90+6'	Stadium: Stade Pierre-Mauroy; Attendance: 46,864; Referee: Bastien Dechepy

21 April 2024 30	Toulouse	2–2	Marseille	Nantes
19:00 CEST (UTC+2)	Diarra (yellow card) 40'; Nicolaisen 45+2'; Gboho 82'	Report	Murillo (yellow card) 33'; Onana 38'; Ounahi (yellow card) 47'; Moumbagna 90+6'	Stadium: Stade de la Beaujoire; Attendance: 29,809; Referee: Clément Turpin

24 April 2024 29	Marseille	2–2	Nice	Marseille
21:00 CEST (UTC+2)	Moumbagna (yellow card) 22' (yellow-red card) 45+2'; Clauss 31'; Aubameyang 56' (pen.)	Report	Moffi (yellow card) 11', (goal) 13'; Cho (yellow card) 54'; Sanson (yellow card) 61'; Bard 72'	Stadium: Stade Vélodrome; Attendance: 58,151; Referee: Jérémie Pignard
Note: The match was originally scheduled for 14 April 2024, but was postponed due to Marseille's progression in the UEFA Europa League.

28 April 2024 31	Marseille	2–1	Lens	Marseille
21:00 CEST (UTC+2)	Aubameyang 1'; Gueye (yellow card) 41', (goal) 85'; Balerdi (yellow card) 63'	Report	Danso (yellow card) 54'; Wahi (yellow card) 65'; Saïd 77'	Stadium: Stade Vélodrome; Attendance: 59,490; Referee: Eric Wattellier

12 May 2024 33	Marseille	3–1	Lorient	Marseille
21:00 CEST (UTC+2)	Aubameyang 36', 54' (pen.), (yellow card) 49'; Gigot 41'; Gueye (yellow card) 73'; Murillo (yellow card) 90+5'	Report	Laporte (yellow card) 17'; B. Mendy 43'; Katseris (yellow card) 51'; Bamba (yellow card) 61'; Abergel (yellow card) 90+2'	Stadium: Stade Vélodrome; Attendance: 62,082; Referee: Bastien Dechepy

15 May 2024 32	Reims	1–0	Marseille	Reims
21:00 CEST (UTC+2)	Diakité (yellow card) 18'; Stambouli (yellow card) 31'; Mbemba 33' (o.g.); Teuma (yellow card) 65'	Report	Kondogbia (yellow card) 55'	Stadium: Stade Auguste-Delaune; Attendance: 19,020; Referee: Hakim Ben El Hadj
Note: The match was originally scheduled for 5 May 2024, but was postponed due to Marseille's progression in the UEFA Europa League.

19 May 2024 34	Le Havre	1–2	Marseille	Le Havre
21:00 CEST (UTC+2)	Sabbi (yellow card) 82'; Bayo 90+7' (pen.)	Report	Aubameyang 64'; Murillo 77'	Stadium: Stade Océane; Attendance: 24,050; Referee: Jérémy Stinat

=== Coupe de France ===
7 January 2024 Round of 64	Thionville Lusitanoss	0–1	Marseille	Longeville-lès-Metz
14:30 CET (UTC+1)	Bourgeois (yellow card) 36'; Belgacem (yellow card) 71'; Ferino (yellow card) 90+1'	Report	Aubameyang 63'; Nadir (yellow card) 67'; Meïté (yellow card) 75'	Stadium: Stade Saint-Symphorien; Attendance: 27,450; Referee: Romain Lissorgue

21 January 2024 Round of 32	Rennes	1–1 (9–8 p)	Marseille	Rennes
21:05 CET (UTC+1)	D. Doué (yellow card) 27'; Bourigeaud (penalty missed) 45+4'; Terrier 53'; Yıldırım (yellow card) 88'	Report	Veretout 29'; Onana (yellow card) 36'; Garcia (yellow card) 45+3'; Vitinha (yellow card) 49'	Stadium: Roazhon Park; Attendance: 28,151; Referee: Jérémie Pignard
	Penalties
	Kalimuendo (penalty scored); Bourigeaud (penalty scored); Santamaria (penalty scored); Le Fée (penalty scored); Blas (penalty scored); Yıldırım (penalty scored); Omari (penalty scored); Belocian (penalty scored); Nagida (penalty scored)		(penalty scored) Veretout; (penalty scored) Balerdi; (penalty scored) Vitinha; (penalty scored) Aubameyang; (penalty scored) Onana; (penalty scored) Luis Henrique; (penalty scored) Clauss; (penalty scored) Garcia; (penalty missed) Gigot

=== UEFA Champions League ===
==== Third qualifying round ====
The draw for the third qualifying round was held on 24 July 2023.

9 August 2023 First leg	Panathinaikos (Greece)	1–0	(France) Marseille	Athens, Greece
21:00 EEST (UTC+3)	Đuričić (yellow card) 43'; Pérez (yellow card) 77'; Bernard 83', (yellow card) 90'	Report	Kondogbia (yellow card) 1' (yellow-red card) 65'; Ndiaye (yellow card) 16'; Balerdi (yellow card) 31'	Stadium: Leoforos Alexandras Stadium; Attendance: 11,270; Referee: István Kovács (Romania)

15 August 2023 Second leg	Marseille (France)	2–1 (a.e.t.) (2–2 agg.) (3–5 p)	(Greece) Panathinaikos	Marseille, France
21:00 CEST (UTC+2)	Aubameyang 2', 45+1', (yellow card) 7'; Veretout (yellow card) 90+11'	Report	Jedvaj (yellow card) 17'; Brignoli (yellow card) 25'; Vagiannidis (yellow card) 67'; Mancini (yellow card) 88'; Pérez (yellow card) 90+6'; Ioannidis 90+9' (pen.); Čerin (yellow card) 91'	Stadium: Stade Vélodrome; Attendance: 63,050; Referee: Michael Oliver (England)
	Penalties
	Guendouzi (penalty missed); Veretout (penalty scored); Sarr (penalty scored); Vitinha (penalty scored)		(penalty scored) Ioannidis; (penalty scored) Bernard; (penalty scored) Kleinheisler; (penalty scored) Palacios; (penalty scored) Mladenović

=== UEFA Europa League ===
==== Group stage ====
The draw for the group stage was held on 1 September 2023.

Pos	Team	Pld	W	D	L	GF	GA	GD	Pts	Qualification	BHA	MAR	AJA	AEK
1	(England) Brighton & Hove Albion	6	4	1	1	10	5	+5	13	Advance to round of 16	—	1–0	2–0	2–3
2	(France) Marseille	6	3	2	1	14	10	+4	11	Advance to knockout round play-offs	2–2	—	4–3	3–1
3	(Netherlands) Ajax	6	1	2	3	10	13	−3	5	Transfer to Europa Conference League	0–2	3–3	—	3–1
4	(Greece) AEK Athens	6	1	1	4	6	12	−6	4		0–1	0–2	1–1	—

Source: UEFA
Rules for classification: Group stage tiebreakers

21 September 2023 1	Ajax (Netherlands)	3–3	(France) Marseille	Amsterdam, Netherlands
21:00 CEST (UTC+2)	Borges 9'; Berghuis 20', (yellow card) 22'; Taylor 52'; Vos (yellow card) 55' (yellow-red card) 90+1'	Report	Clauss 23'; Aubameyang 38', 78'; Gigot (yellow card) 90+7'	Stadium: Johan Cruyff Arena; Attendance: 53,000; Referee: Maurizio Mariani (Italy)
Note: Gigot received a yellow card following the final whistle.

5 October 2023 2	Marseille (France)	2–2	(England) Brighton & Hove Albion	Marseille, France
18:45 CEST (UTC+2)	Mbemba 19'; Veretout 20'; Sarr (yellow card) 84'; Clauss (yellow card) 87'; Balerdi (yellow card) 89'	Report	Groß 54', (yellow card) 56'; Veltman (yellow card) 84'; Dunk (yellow card) 84'; João Pedro 88' (pen.); Ferguson (yellow card) 90+5'	Stadium: Stade Vélodrome; Attendance: 63,465; Referee: Mykola Balakin (Ukraine)

26 October 2023 3	Marseille (France)	3–1	(Greece) AEK Athens	Marseille, France
18:45 CEST (UTC+2)	Balerdi (yellow card) 26'; Vitinha 27'; Clauss (yellow card) 32'; Harit 60' (pen.); Veretout 69' (pen.)	Report	Sidibé (yellow card) 12'; Rota (yellow card) 45+3'; Pineda 53'; Stanković (red card) 57'; Amrabat (yellow card) 69'; Jønsson (yellow card) 83'	Stadium: Stade Vélodrome; Attendance: 65,092; Referee: Daniel Stefański (Poland)

9 November 2023 4	AEK Athens (Greece)	0–2	(France) Marseille	Athens, Greece
22:00 EET (UTC+2)	Gaćinović (yellow card) 28'; Ponce (yellow card) 66'	Report	Mbemba 25'; Vitinha (yellow card) 45+3'; Sarr 90+3'	Stadium: AEK Arena; Attendance: 30,530; Referee: Glenn Nyberg (Sweden)

30 November 2023 5	Marseille (France)	4–3	(Netherlands) Ajax	Marseille, France
21:00 CET (UTC+1)	Aubameyang 9' (pen.), 48', 90+3' (pen.); Mbemba 26'; Lodi (yellow card) 69'; Sarr (yellow card) 90'	Report	Brobbey 10', 30'; Berghuis (red card) 63'; Taylor (yellow card) 71'; Hlynsson (yellow card) 77'; Akpom 79'; Rensch (yellow card) 90+3'; Hato (yellow card) 90+8'	Stadium: Stade Vélodrome; Attendance: 60,638; Referee: Simone Sozza (Italy)

14 December 2023 6	Brighton & Hove Albion (England)	1–0	(France) Marseille	Brighton and Hove, England
20:00 GMT (UTC±0)	Lallana (yellow card) 79'; Mitoma (yellow card) 84'; João Pedro 88', (yellow card) 89'; Steele (yellow card) 90+5'	Report	Mbemba (yellow card) 76'; Ounahi (yellow card) 79'; Sarr (yellow card) 90+4'	Stadium: Falmer Stadium; Attendance: 30,214; Referee: José María Sánchez Martínez (Spain)

==== Knockout phase ====
===== Knockout round play-offs =====
The draw for the knockout round play-offs was held on 18 December 2023.

15 February 2024 First leg	Shakhtar Donetsk (Ukraine)	2–2	(France) Marseille	Hamburg, Germany (Note: Due to the Russian invasion of Ukraine, Ukrainian teams are required to play their home matches at neutral venues until further notice.)
18:45 CET (UTC+1)	Konoplya (yellow card) 49'; Matviyenko 68'; Zubkov (yellow card) 78'; Eguinaldo 90+3', (yellow card) 90+3'; Bondar (yellow card) 90+5'	Report	Balerdi (yellow card) 27'; Aubameyang 64'; Ndiaye 90'	Stadium: Volksparkstadion; Attendance: 28,790; Referee: Erik Lambrechts (Belgium)

22 February 2024 Second leg	Marseille (France)	3–1 (5–3 agg.)	(Ukraine) Shakhtar Donetsk	Marseille, France
21:00 CET (UTC+1)	Gigot (yellow card) 17'; Aubameyang 23'; Sarr 74'; Kondogbia 81'	Report	Sudakov 12' (pen.); Eguinaldo (yellow card) 45'; Konoplya (yellow card) 45+3'; Matviyenko (yellow card) 58'; Stepanenko (yellow card) 80'; Rakitskiy (yellow card) 90+2'	Stadium: Stade Vélodrome; Attendance: 63,182; Referee: Tobias Stieler (Germany)

===== Round of 16 =====
The draw for the round of 16 was held on 23 February 2024.

7 March 2024 First leg	Marseille (France)	4–0	(Spain) Villarreal	Marseille, France
21:00 CET (UTC+1)	Merlin (yellow card) 13'; Veretout 23'; Mosquera 28' (o.g.); Aubameyang 42' (pen.), 59'	Report	Mandi (yellow card) 9'; Comesaña (yellow card) 45+1'; Moreno (yellow card) 52' (yellow-red card) 62'; Cuenca (yellow card) 72'	Stadium: Stade Vélodrome; Attendance: 53,396; Referee: Serdar Gözübüyük (Netherlands)

14 March 2024 Second leg	Villarreal (Spain)	3–1 (3–5 agg.)	(France) Marseille	Villarreal, Spain
18:45 CET (UTC+1)	Coquelin (yellow card) 19'; Capoue 32'; Sørloth 54'; Mosquera 86', (yellow card) 90+2'; Baena (yellow card) 90+2'	Report	Sarr (yellow card) 19'; Ounahi (yellow card) 48'; Merlin (yellow card) 69'; Kondogbia (yellow card) 85'; López (yellow card) 90+3'; Clauss 90+4'	Stadium: Estadio de la Cerámica; Attendance: 15,378; Referee: István Kovács (Romania)

===== Quarter-finals =====
The draw for the quarter-finals was held on 15 March 2024.

11 April 2024 First leg	Benfica (Portugal)	2–1	(France) Marseille	Lisbon, Portugal
20:00 WEST (UTC+1)	R. Silva 16'; Neres (yellow card) 18'; Di María 52'	Report	Aubameyang 67'	Stadium: Estádio da Luz; Attendance: 53,845; Referee: Michael Oliver (England)

18 April 2024 Second leg	Marseille (France)	1–0 (a.e.t.) (2–2 agg.) (4–2 p)	(Portugal) Benfica	Marseille, France
21:00 CEST (UTC+2)	Mbemba (yellow card) 45+2'; Moumbagna 79'; Harit (yellow card) 89'; Gigot (yellow card) 89'	Report	A. Silva (yellow card) 38'; Tengstedt (yellow card) 60'; Kökçü (yellow card) 110'; Florentino (yellow card) 114'	Stadium: Stade Vélodrome; Attendance: 59,645; Referee: Felix Zwayer (Germany)
	Penalties
	Correa (penalty scored); Kondogbia (penalty scored); Balerdi (penalty scored); Luis Henrique (penalty scored)		(penalty missed) Di María; (penalty scored) Kökçü; (penalty scored) Otamendi; (penalty missed) A. Silva

===== Semi-finals =====
The draw for the semi-finals was held on 15 March 2024, after the draw for the quarter-finals.

2 May 2024 First leg	Marseille (France)	1–1	(Italy) Atalanta	Marseille, France
21:00 CEST (UTC+2)	Mbemba 20'; Balerdi (yellow card) 69'	Report	Scamacca 11'	Stadium: Stade Vélodrome; Attendance: 64,475; Referee: Daniel Siebert (Germany)

9 May 2024 Second leg	Atalanta (Italy)	3–0 (4–1 agg.)	(France) Marseille	Bergamo, Italy
21:00 CEST (UTC+2)	Lookman 30'; Éderson (yellow card) 47'; Ruggeri 52'; De Roon (yellow card) 63'; Touré 90+5'	Report		Stadium: Stadio Atleti Azzurri d'Italia; Attendance: 14,994; Referee: Jesús Gil Manzano (Spain)

== Statistics ==
=== Appearances and goals ===
No.	Pos	Nat	Player	Total		Ligue 1		Coupe de France		UEFA Champions League		UEFA Europa League	
No.	Pos	Nat	Player	Apps	Goals	Apps	Goals	Apps	Goals	Apps	Goals	Apps	Goals
Goalkeepers
1	GK	(Cameroon) CMR	Simon Ngapandouetnbu	0	0	0	0	0	0	0	0	0	0
16	GK	(Spain) ESP	Pau López	49	0	33	0	1	0	2	0	13	0
36	GK	(Spain) ESP	Rubén Blanco	5	0	1+1	0	1	0	0+1	0	1	0
Defenders
3	DF	(France) FRA	Quentin Merlin	17	0	8+2	0	0	0	0	0	6+1	0
4	DF	(France) FRA	Samuel Gigot	33	3	20+1	3	2	0	2	0	7+1	0
5	DF	(Argentina) ARG	Leonardo Balerdi	42	2	26+1	2	2	0	1	0	11+1	0
6	DF	(Switzerland) SUI	Ulisses Garcia	14	0	9+4	0	0+1	0	0	0	0	0
7	DF	(France) FRA	Jonathan Clauss	41	5	25+2	3	0	0	2	0	12	2
18	DF	(Ivory Coast) CIV	Bamo Meïté	25	0	6+10	0	2	0	0	0	3+4	0
62	DF	(Panama) PAN	Michael Amir Murillo	25	3	10+6	3	2	0	0	0	2+5	0
99	DF	(Democratic Republic of the Congo) COD	Chancel Mbemba	40	6	25	2	0	0	1+1	0	13	4
Midfielders
8	MF	(Morocco) MAR	Azzedine Ounahi	35	2	15+6	2	0	0	2	0	6+6	0
11	MF	(Morocco) MAR	Amine Harit	44	2	21+7	1	0	0	0+2	0	13+1	1
17	MF	(Cameroon) CMR	Jean Onana	14	1	5+8	1	1	0	0	0	0	0
19	MF	(Central African Republic) CAF	Geoffrey Kondogbia	41	1	15+11	0	1	0	1	0	12+1	1
21	MF	(France) FRA	Valentin Rongier	15	0	10	0	0	0	1+1	0	3	0
22	MF	(Senegal) SEN	Pape Gueye	15	1	9+6	1	0	0	0	0	0	0
23	MF	(Senegal) SEN	Ismaïla Sarr	35	5	15+8	3	0	0	2	0	4+6	2
27	MF	(France) FRA	Jordan Veretout	46	5	24+5	1	2	1	2	0	11+2	3
34	MF	(Morocco) MAR	Bilal Nadir	9	0	1+4	0	2	0	0	0	0+2	0
37	MF	(England) ENG	Emran Soglo	9	1	1+2	1	0+1	0	0	0	1+4	0
46	MF	(France) FRA	Gaël Lafont	1	0	0	0	0	0	0	0	0+1	0
49	MF	(Comoros) COM	Raimane Daou	2	0	0+1	0	0	0	0	0	0+1	0
66	MF	(Belgium) BEL	Noam Mayoka-Tika	1	0	0+1	0	0	0	0	0	0	0
Forwards
10	FW	(Gabon) GAB	Pierre-Emerick Aubameyang	51	30	30+4	17	2	1	2	2	11+2	10
14	FW	(Cameroon) CMR	Faris Moumbagna	20	3	5+8	3	0	0	0	0	3+4	0
20	FW	(Argentina) ARG	Joaquín Correa	19	0	6+6	0	0	0	0	0	3+4	0
29	FW	(Senegal) SEN	Iliman Ndiaye	47	6	20+11	4	0	0	2	0	8+6	2
41	FW	(France) FRA	Sofiane Sidi-Ali	2	0	0+2	0	0	0	0	0	0	0
42	FW	(France) FRA	Keyliane Abdallah	1	0	0+1	0	0	0	0	0	0	0
44	FW	(Brazil) BRA	Luis Henrique	24	1	7+8	1	0+2	0	0	0	3+4	0
Players transferred out during the season
9	FW	(Portugal) POR	Vitinha	27	4	10+8	3	2	0	0+1	0	3+3	1
6	MF	(France) FRA	Matteo Guendouzi	4	0	0+2	0	0	0	0+2	0	0	0
12	DF	(Brazil) BRA	Renan Lodi	23	0	14	0	1	0	2	0	5+1	0
24	FW	(Cameroon) CMR	François-Régis Mughe	7	0	2+3	0	0	0	0+1	0	0+1	0
29	DF	(Spain) ESP	Pol Lirola	0	0	0	0	0	0	0	0	0	0
95	DF	(France) FRA	Isaak Touré	0	0	0	0	0	0	0	0	0	0

Source: Competitions
