= Giorgio Repetto =

Italian footballer, coach and sporting director

Personal information
- Full name: Giorgio Repetto
- Date of birth: November 5, 1952 (age 73)
- Place of birth: Lavagna, Italy
- Height: 1.72 m (5 ft 7 1/2 in)
- Position: Midfielder

Youth career
- Sampdoria

Senior career*
Years	Team	Apps	(Gls)
1971–1975	Sampdoria	15	(1)
1972–1973	→Mantova (loan)	7	(0)
1973–1974	→Parma (loan)	29	(2)
1975–1980	Pescara	153	(7)
1980–1981	Avellino	12	(0)
1981–1982	Cavese	30	(0)
1982–1983	Pescara	28	(1)
1983–1985	Messina	65	(1)
1982–1986	Francavilla	22	(1)

Managerial career
- 1989–1980: Cusago
- 1990–1991: Celano
- 1992–1993: Francavilla
- 2014–2015: Pescara (assistant)
- * Club domestic league appearances and goals as of 25 July 2026

Giorgio Repetto (born 5 November 1952) is an Italian football executive, coach, and former footballer. A midfielder during his playing career, he is regarded as a club legend of Pescara, for whom he scored the club's first-ever Serie A goal, and later served the club for many years as sporting director.

== Playing career ==
Repetto came through the youth academy at Sampdoria and made his first-team debut during the 1971–72 season, scoring in a Coppa Italia win away to Bari. He then spent two seasons on loan in Serie B, first as a backup player at Mantova, and then as a regular starter at Parma, before returning to Sampdoria for the 1974–75 season. At the end of that season, Sampdoria sold him to Pescara, then playing in Serie B.

Repetto spent six seasons at Pescara, becoming one of the club's most celebrated players. He was a key part of the side that won promotion to Serie A for the first time in the club's history in 1976–77, and also achieved a second promotion in 1978–79. On 11 September 1977, on the opening day of Pescara's first-ever Serie A campaign, Repetto scored the club's first goal in the competition's history, a second-half consolation goal in a 3–1 home defeat to Napoli. Pescara finished bottom of Serie A and were relegated at the end of the 1979–80 season.

Repetto moved to Serie A club Avellino in 1980. Avellino had begun the campaign with a five-point deduction as a result of the 1980 Totonero betting scandal, and Repetto contributed to the club's survival. He then moved to newly promoted Serie B club Cavese for 1981–82, helping them retain their Serie B status, before leaving top-level football. He continued playing in the lower divisions until his retirement in 1986, with his final club being Francavilla.

== Coaching and scouting career ==
After retiring as a player, Repetto worked as a coach before spending around 18 years as a scout and collaborator for Chievo Verona. While coaching a youth team in Manoppello, he discovered a 9-year old Marco Verratti and recommended him for a trial at Chievo.

== Executive career ==
Repetto returned to Pescara as sporting director in 2013, following the club's relegation from Serie A, and worked as assistant coach for the club during the 2014–15 season. In May 2016, he was removed from his role due to disagreements with club president Daniele Sebastiani, shortly before Pescara won promotion back to Serie A. He reconciled with the club in 2018 and returned as sporting director, appointing coach Giuseppe Pillon, who led Pescara to the Serie B play-off semi-finals. Repetto left the club definitively in 2021.

== Personal life ==
Repetto is the father-in-law of former footballer and manager Fabio Grosso, and the maternal grandfather of footballer Filippo Grosso.
