= Raimane Daou =

Footballer (born 2004)

Personal information
- Date of birth: 20 November 2004 (age 21)
- Place of birth: Dzaoudzi, Mayotte, France
- Height: 1.82 m (6 ft 0 in)
- Position: Defensive midfielder

Team information
- Current team: Concarneau
- Number: 29

Youth career
- FC Septèmes
- Marignane Gignac
- 2020–2021: SC Air Bel
- 2021: Marseille

Senior career*
Years	Team	Apps	(Gls)
2021–2025	Marseille B	51	(3)
2021–2026	Marseille	1	(0)
2025–2026	→ Aubagne Air Bel (loan)	17	(0)
2026–	Concarneau	0	(0)

International career^{‡}
2022	Comoros U20	4	(0)
2023–	Comoros	4	(0)
- * Club domestic league appearances and goals as of 23 June 2026 ‡ National team caps and goals as of 25 March 2024

Raimane Daou (born 20 November 2004) is a professional footballer who plays as a defensive midfielder for Ligue 3 club Concarneau. Born in Mayotte, France, he plays for the Comoros national team.

== Club career ==
Daou is a youth product of FC Septèmes, Marignane Gignac and SC Air Bel, before moving to the reserves of Marseille in 2021 on a contract until 2024. In the 2022–23 season he made an appearance on the senior match day squad for a Coupe de France match against Hyères FC.

== International career ==
Born in France, Daou is of Comorian descent. He made the final squad for the Comoros U20s at the 2022 Maurice Revello Tournament. He debuted with the senior Comoros national team in a 2–1 friendly win over Cape Verde on 17 October 2023.

== Playing style ==
Daou is a versatile midfielder who likes to participate and contribute with the ball. He is strong at holding the ball and releasing it up the field, and makes himself available for passes. He is able to play all across the midfield and defensive backline.

== Career statistics ==
=== Club ===
As of match played 11 May 2024

Club	Season	League			Cup		Continental		Other		Total	
Club	Season	Division	Apps	Goals	Apps	Goals	Apps	Goals	Apps	Goals	Apps	Goals
Marseille B	2021–22	CFA 2	1	0	—		—		—		1	0
Marseille B	2022–23	CFA 3	15	2	—		—		—		15	2
Marseille B	2023–24	CFA 3	19	0	—		—		—		19	0
Marseille B	Total		35	2	—		—		—		35	2
Marseille	2023–24	Ligue 1	1	0	0	0	1 (Note: Appearances in UEFA Europa League)	0	—		2	0
Career total			36	2	0	0	1	0	0	0	37	2

=== International ===
As of match played 25 March 2024

Appearances and goals by national team and year
National team	Year	Apps	Goals
Comoros	2023	1	0
Comoros	2024	3	0
Total		4	0
