= Filippo Grosso =

Italian footballer

Personal information
- Date of birth: 7 September 2006 (age 20)
- Place of birth: Pescara, Italy
- Height: 1.79 m (5 ft 10 in)
- Position: Midfielder

Team information
- Current team: Crotone (on loan from Frosinone)
- Number: 80

Youth career
- 2022–2024: Juventus
- 2024–2025: Frosinone

Senior career*
Years	Team	Apps	(Gls)
2025–	Frosinone	8	(1)
2026–	→ Crotone (loan)	1	(0)
- * Club domestic league appearances and goals as of 29 August 2026

Filippo Grosso (born 7 September 2006) is an Italian professional footballer who plays as a midfielder for Serie C Group C club Crotone, on loan from Frosinone.

== Early life and family ==
Grosso was born in Pescara, two months after his father Fabio Grosso scored the decisive penalty as Italy won the 2006 FIFA World Cup final against France. His maternal grandfather is Giorgio Repetto, a midfielder and later executive who became a club legend at Pescara.

== Club career ==
On 30 August 2024, he transferred from the youth academy of Juventus to Frosinone. He made his senior and professional debut with Frosinone as a substitute in a 2–0 loss to Palermo on 9 May 2025.
