= François Mughe =

Cameroonian footballer (born 2004)

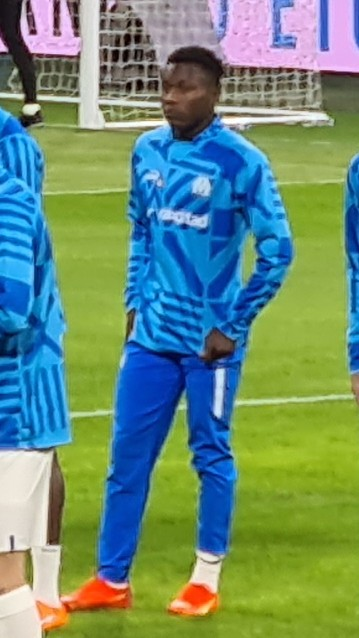
- François-Régis Mughe

Personal information
- Full name: François-Régis Mughe
- Date of birth: 16 June 2004 (age 22)
- Place of birth: Douala, Cameroon
- Height: 1.73 m (5 ft 8 in)
- Position: Winger

Team information
- Current team: AEL Limassol
- Number: 77

Youth career
- 2012–2022: EF Brasseries

Senior career*
Years	Team	Apps	(Gls)
2022–2026	Marseille B	10	(2)
2023–2026	Marseille	6	(0)
2024	→ Dunkerque (loan)	5	(0)
2025	→ Athens Kallithea (loan)	5	(0)
2026–	AEL Limassol	20	(1)

International career^{‡}
2023–	Cameroon U23	2	(0)
- * Club domestic league appearances and goals as of 7 November 2026 ‡ National team caps and goals as of 19:45, 1 April 2023 (UTC)

François-Régis Mughe (born 16 June 2004) is a Cameroonian professional footballer who plays as a winger for AEL Limassol.

== Club career ==
=== Marseille ===
A youth product of Ecole de Football Brasseries du Cameroun since 2012, Mughe transferred to Marseille on 24 June 2022, signing a five-year contract. He was originally assigned to Marseille's reserves, before training with their senior team in early 2023. He made his professional debut with Marseille as a late substitute in a 2–2 (7–6) penalty shootout loss in the Coupe de France to Annecy on 1 March 2023, scoring his side's second goal in the 90+6th minute.

==== Dunkerque (loan) ====
On 1 February 2024, Mughe was loaned out to Ligue 2 side Dunkerque until the end of the season.

== International career ==
Mughe was due to be called up to the Cameroon U17s for the 2021 Africa U-17 Cup of Nations, but the tournament was cancelled due to the COVID-19 pandemic. He played for the Cameroon U23s for a set of 2023 U-23 Africa Cup of Nations qualification matches in March 2023.

== Playing style ==
Omar Sciolla, a scout in Africa for Marseille, described Mughe as "right-footed but can play on either wing, as he's two footed. A very fast player, very strong in one-on-one situations, with already well-developed technique.". Sciolla also described Mughe as having "enormous potential".

== Career statistics ==
As of match played 3 December 2023

Appearances and goals by club, season and competition
Club	Season	League			Cup		Continental		Total	
Club	Season	Division	Apps	Goals	Apps	Goals	Apps	Goals	Apps	Goals
Marseille	2022–23	Ligue 1	1	0	1	1	0	0	2	1
Marseille	2023–24	Ligue 1	5	0	0	0	2	0	7	0
Career total			6	0	1	1	2	0	9	1
