= Quentin Merlin =

French footballer (born 2002)

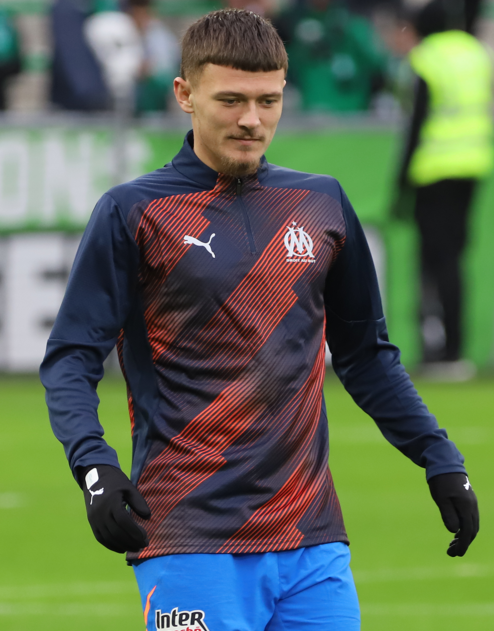
- Merlin with Marseille in 2024

Personal information
- Date of birth: 16 May 2002 (age 24)
- Place of birth: Nantes, France
- Height: 1.73 m (5 ft 8 in)
- Positions: Left-back; left wing-back

Team information
- Current team: Rennes
- Number: 26

Youth career
- 2008–2012: FC Goélands Samaritains
- 2012–2013: Nantes
- 2013–2015: Pornic Foot
- 2015–2021: Nantes

Senior career*
Years	Team	Apps	(Gls)
2020–2023	Nantes B	10	(1)
2021–2024	Nantes	68	(3)
2024–2025	Marseille	37	(1)
2025–	Rennes	33	(1)

International career^{‡}
2017–2018	France U16	3	(0)
2018–2019	France U17	6	(1)
2019–2020	France U18	3	(0)
2021	France U20	3	(0)
2022–2025	France U21	19	(2)
- * Club domestic league appearances and goals as of 19 May 2026 ‡ National team caps and goals as of 25 June 2025

Quentin Merlin (born 16 May 2002) is a French professional footballer who plays as a left-back or left wing-back for Ligue 1 club Rennes.

== Early life ==
Born in Nantes, Merlin grew up in Sainte-Marie-sur-Mer, in a family with Méricourtois origins. Football-wise, he was formed in Brittany, between the towns of Nantes and Pornic.

== Club career ==
=== Nantes ===
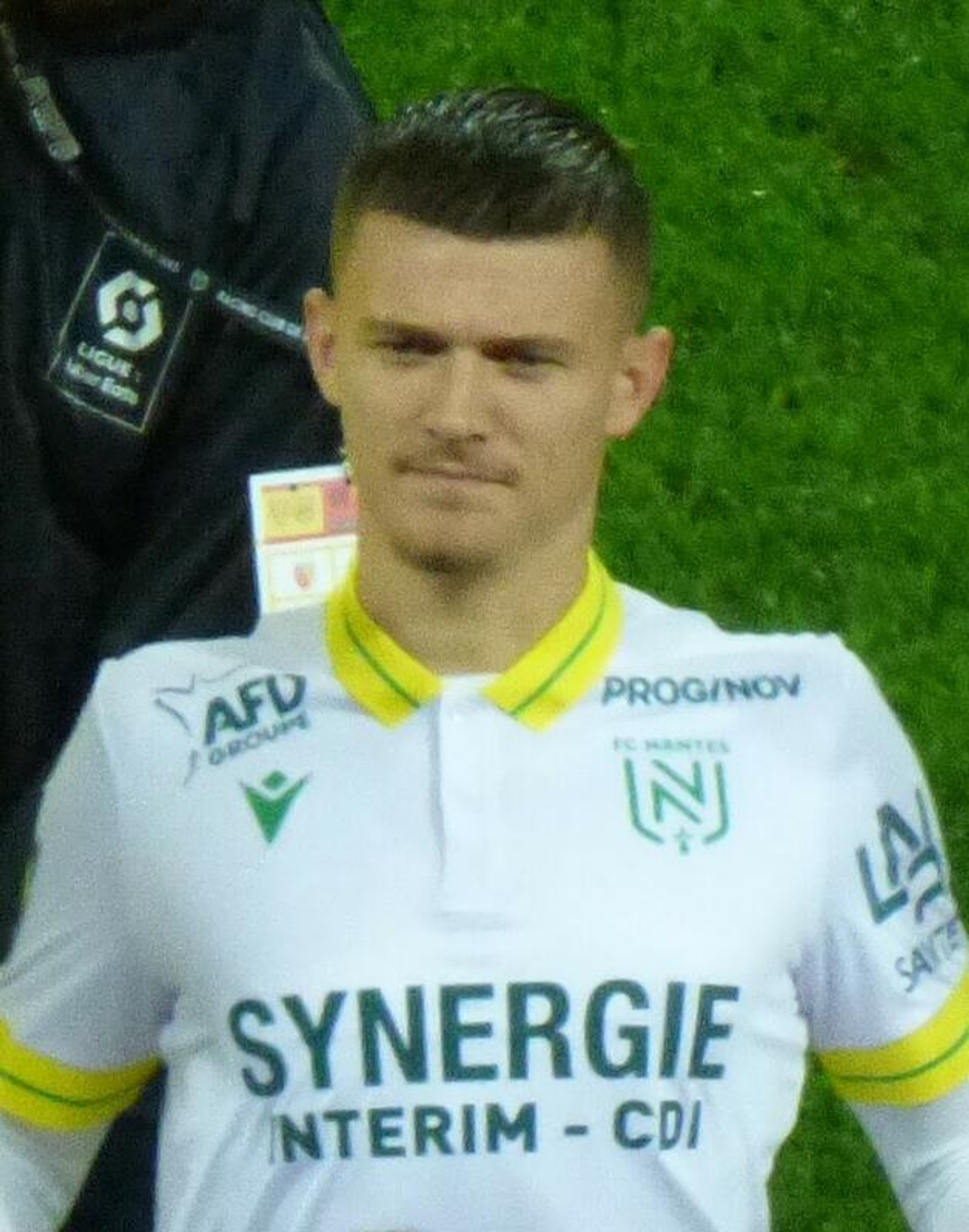
Merlin with Nantes in 2024

In January 2021, Merlin was selected by Nantes manager Raymond Domenech several times for the professional squad. He eventually made his professional debut for Nantes on 10 February 2021, coming on as a half-time substitute for Ludovic Blas in a 4–2 Coupe de France loss to Lens.

The manager who selected Merlin for the game was not on the bench as the young player entered the field, Domenech having been tested positive for COVID-19, and eventually learning he had been fired right after the Lens game. Antoine Kombouaré succeeded him in the manager position.

On 19 March 2021, Merlin signed his first professional contract with Nantes. On 19 February 2022, he scored his first goal in a 3–1 victory over Paris Saint-Germain. He achieved his first title with the club by winning the Coupe de France.

=== Marseille ===
On 26 January 2024, Merlin moved to fellow Ligue 1 side Marseille, having agreed a contract until 2028. The transfer fee paid to Nantes was reported as €12 million. In the latter stages of the 2023–24 season, he became part of the team which reached the Europa League semi-finals.

=== Rennes ===
On 21 July 2025, Merlin signed with Ligue 1 side Rennes, signing a four-year deal.

== International career ==
Merlin is a youth international for France.

== Career statistics ==
As of match played 17 May 2025

Appearances and goals by club, season and competition
Club	Season	League			Coupe de France		Europe		Total	
Club	Season	Division	Apps	Goals	Apps	Goals	Apps	Goals	Apps	Goals
Nantes B	2020–21	National 2	7	0	—		—		7	0
Nantes B	2021–22	National 2	1	1	—		—		1	1
Nantes B	2022–23	National 2	2	0	—		—		2	0
Nantes B	Total		10	1	—		—		10	1
Nantes	2020–21	Ligue 1	0	0	1	0	—		1	0
Nantes	2021–22	Ligue 1	28	2	5	0	—		33	2
Nantes	2022–23	Ligue 1	24	1	1	0	4 (Note: Appearances in UEFA Europa League)	0	29	1
Nantes	2023–24	Ligue 1	16	0	2	0	—		18	0
Nantes	Total		68	3	9	0	4	0	81	0
Marseille	2023–24	Ligue 1	10	0	—		7	0	17	0
Marseille	2024–25	Ligue 1	27	1	0	0	—		27	1
Marseille	Total		37	1	0	0	7	0	44	1
Career total			115	5	9	0	11	0	135	5

== Honours ==
Nantes

- Coupe de France: 2021–22
- Trophée des Champions runner-up: 2022

Individual

- UEFA European Under-21 Championship Team of the Tournament: 2025
