= Fabio Grosso =

Italian football manager (born 1977)

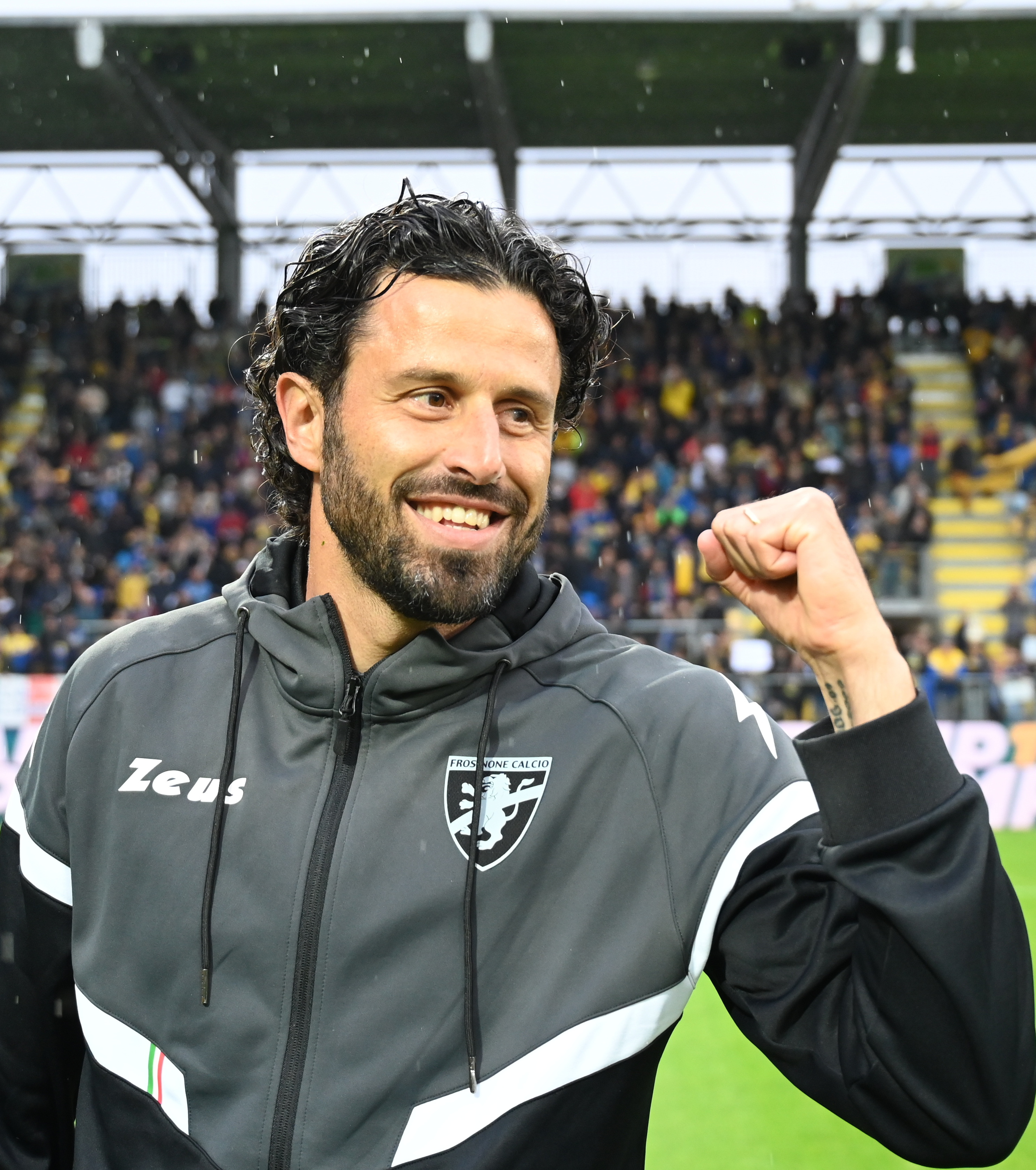
- Grosso with Frosinone in 2023

Personal information
- Full name: Fabio Grosso
- Date of birth: 28 November 1977 (age 48)
- Place of birth: Rome, Italy
- Height: 1.90 m (6 ft 3 in)
- Position: Left-back

Youth career
- 1994–1995: Renato Curi

Senior career*
Years	Team	Apps	(Gls)
1995–1999	Renato Curi	125	(55)
1999–2001	Chieti	68	(17)
2001–2004	Perugia	67	(7)
2004–2006	Palermo	90	(2)
2006–2007	Inter Milan	23	(2)
2007–2009	Lyon	53	(2)
2009–2012	Juventus	47	(2)
Total		473	(87)

International career
2003–2009	Italy	48	(4)

Managerial career
- 2017–2018: Bari
- 2018–2019: Hellas Verona
- 2019: Brescia
- 2020–2021: Sion
- 2021–2023: Frosinone
- 2023: Lyon
- 2024–2026: Sassuolo
- 2026: Fiorentina
Medal record
Men's football
Representing Italy
FIFA World Cup
Winner	2006 Germany
- * Club domestic league appearances and goals

Fabio Grosso Ufficiale OMRI (Italian pronunciation: [ˈfaːbjo ˈɡrɔsso]; born 28 November 1977) is an Italian professional football manager and former player.

After playing for several smaller Italian clubs, such as Renato Curi, Chieti and Perugia, he made his breakthrough during his two seasons as a left-back with Palermo, which earned him a move to defending Serie A champions Inter Milan in 2006. During his only season with Inter, he helped the club defend the Serie A title and win the Supercoppa Italiana. He later also won titles with Lyon in France and with Juventus. Grosso retired in 2012 after winning the Scudetto with Juventus.

At international level, Grosso made 48 appearances for Italy and scored the decisive late first goal against Germany in the 2006 World Cup semi-final. In the 95th minute of the match vs Australia, he cut inside past Lucas Neill, who slid to block and mistimed his tackle, bringing Grosso down. Totti then scored the resultant winning penalty.

He also scored the winning penalty in the penalty shootout against France in the final of the tournament which enabled the Azzurri to win the trophy for the fourth time in their history. He also represented Italy at UEFA Euro 2008 and at the 2009 FIFA Confederations Cup.

== Club career ==
=== Renato Curi ===
Grosso was born in Rome but hails from Chieti, Abruzzo, where his family soon returned to. Grosso joined Renato Curi Angolana in 1994 and played in the club's youth system until 1995. He was promoted to the senior squad for the 1995–96 season and soon became a key part of the first team. Following the 1997–98 season, he left the Eccellenza club to join Chieti for an undisclosed transfer fee. Grosso made 108 official appearances for Renato Curi, scoring 47 goals as an attacking midfielder and left winger.

=== Chieti ===
In summer 1998, Grosso transferred to Chieti of Serie C2. An attacking midfielder at the time, he again impressed in his three-season spell with Chieti. He scored 17 goals in 68 league appearances. He was scouted by Serie A club Perugia in 2001, and in mid-summer, Grosso officially transferred to the club.

=== Perugia ===
In July 2001, Grosso officially joined Perugia. In his debut Serie A season, he made 24 appearances and scored one goal. By now, he had been converted into a left wing-back by head coach Serse Cosmi and in his second season in Perugia, he maintained a starting position and made 30 league appearances, scoring four goals. In his third season with Perugia, Grosso made just 12 appearances in the first six months of the 2003–04 season. Grosso transferred from Perugia in January 2004 to Palermo, which at the time played in Serie B.

=== Palermo ===
During the winter transfer window in January 2004, Grosso transferred to the Sicilian side and they earned promotion at the conclusion to the season. Grosso made 21 appearances for his new club in the latter portion of the 2003–04 season, scoring one goal, as the club won the Serie B title.

Palermo's first season in Serie A was very successful as the club managed a very impressive sixth-place finish, losing just nine matches and also qualifying for the UEFA Cup. Grosso contributed as a regular starter, making 36 league appearances, also scoring a single goal. During the 2005–06 Serie A season, Grosso made 33 appearances for his club as Palermo impressed, finishing eighth in Serie A. He was one of four Palermo players who made Marcello Lippi's 2006 FIFA World Cup-winning squad, but at the conclusion of the tournament, Grosso was sold to Inter Milan.

=== Inter Milan ===
In July 2006, Grosso joined Inter for a reported €5 million transfer fee (plus Paolo Dellafiore). However, Grosso was in-and-out of the club's starting line-up and was mostly used as a substitute. He made just 23 appearances for Inter in the league, and scored two goals, as the team captured the 2006 Supercoppa Italiana and the Serie A title. Following the disappointing season with Inter, Grosso opted to move abroad and was sold to Lyon in the summer of 2007, just one year after his move to Inter.

=== Lyon ===
In July 2007, Grosso moved abroad and signed a four-year contract with Lyon of the French Ligue 1, after passing a medical and agreeing personal terms. The transfer fee was €7.5 million. He was issued the number 11 shirt. In his first season, he was part of the club's starting line-up in both the UEFA Champions League and Ligue 1, and won the league title, the Coupe de France and the Trophée des Champions. In his second season with Lyon, Grosso was limited to just 22 league appearances, partially due to injury, but was heavily linked with a move back to Italy during the 2009 summer transfer window. In August 2009, he officially returned to Italy, joining Juventus.

=== Juventus ===
On 31 August 2009, it was confirmed Grosso had returned to Serie A to join Juventus, following his two-year spell in France. After chasing the defender all summer long, the parties struck a deal on the final day of the transfer market at a €2 million fee plus bonus up to €1 million. He was instantly inserted into Juventus' starting XI, and began the season in good form. He scored his first goal in a league game against Udinese in November 2009. He made 28 appearances during the season, and scored two goals.

In the 2010–11 season, Juventus released several elder players, but Grosso reportedly refused any transfer. Juve youth product Paolo De Ceglie took back the starting place and Grosso was frozen out from the start of season, as well as being excluded from 25-man squad for 2010–11 UEFA Europa League. However, after Juventus lost numbers of players due to injury, Grosso and Hasan Salihamidžić were recalled for the first time, on 6 November. He made two appearances in his final season, the 2011–12 season, as new head coach Antonio Conte either preferred De Ceglie or had a winger or wide midfielder deputize as a fullback or wingback in a 3–5–2 formation. Juventus won the title undefeated that season. Grosso's contract ended in the summer of 2012 and he opted to retire from professional football.

== International career ==
=== Early career ===
Grosso made his international debut with the Italy national team on 30 April 2003 in a 2–1 friendly away win over Switzerland, under head coach Giovanni Trapattoni. He scored his first goal for Italy in a 1–1 away draw against Scotland, on 2 September 2005, in a 2006 FIFA World Cup qualifying match.

=== 2006 World Cup ===
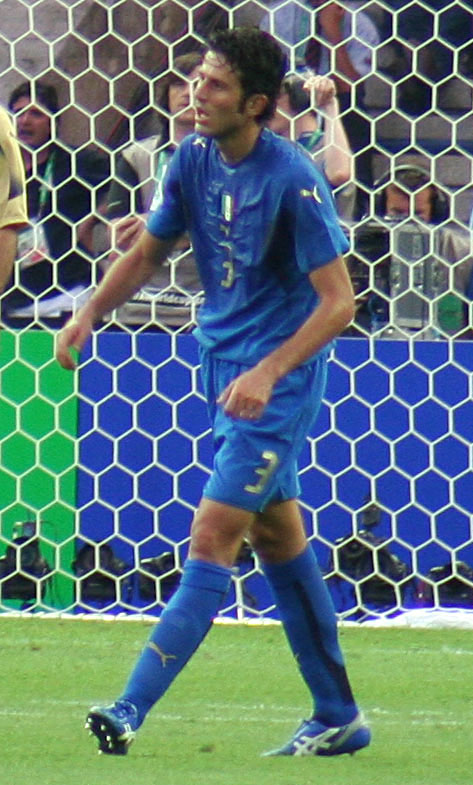
Grosso with Italy at the 2006 FIFA World Cup Final

From 2005 onwards, Grosso became a regular member of the starting line-up at left-back under Marcello Lippi, and was called up to represent Italy at the 2006 FIFA World Cup by Lippi, playing a key role throughout the tournament as the Italians went on to win the title.

In injury time of the round of 16 fixture against Australia, with the score tied at 0–0, Grosso advanced with the ball into the box from the left flank and was fouled in the penalty area by Lucas Neill, who went to ground, allowing Grosso to dive. Francesco Totti subsequently converted the decisive penalty issued by referee Luis Medina Cantalejo, as a ten-man Italy won the match 1–0 to advance to the quarter-finals. However, Grosso was accused of diving by many media outlets. In 2010, Grosso sat down with an Australian media outlet where he said he did not stay on his feet because he was exhausted and "didn't have the strength to go forward", he said he "felt contact, so I went down" and "maybe I accentuated it a little bit".

On 4 July 2006, Grosso scored the first goal against hosts Germany in the 119th minute of the World Cup semi-finals, with a curling left-footed strike beyond the reach of Jens Lehmann into the Germans' net from the edge of the box, which commentator John Motson would describe as "magnificent", while Grosso ran about screaming "Non ci credo!" ("I don't believe it!") as his teammates celebrated. In the World Cup final, five days later, he scored the winning penalty against France in a 5–3 victory in the resulting shoot-out after a 1–1 draw following extra-time, which allowed the Italy national team to win their fourth World Cup title.

=== Later career ===
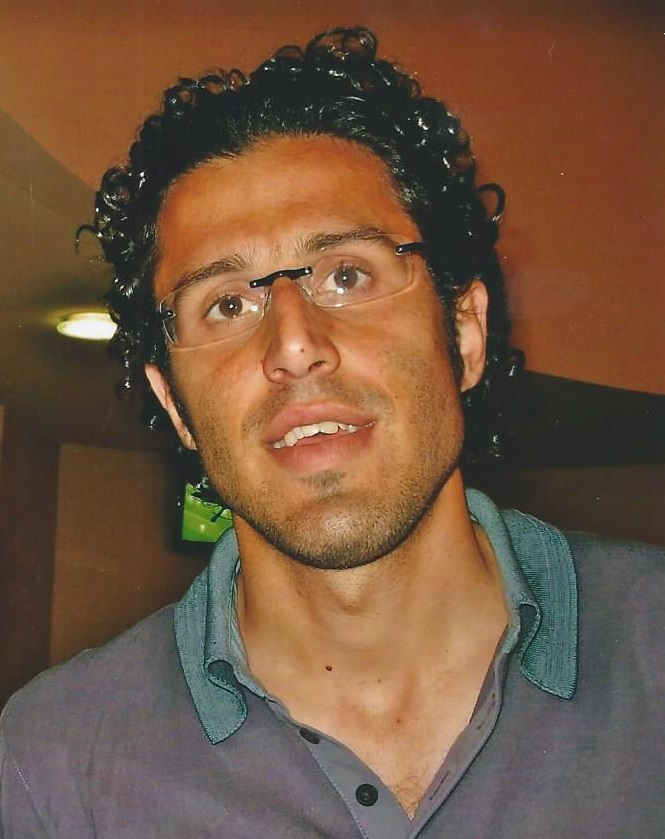
Grosso in 2008

Grosso was also included in Roberto Donadoni's 23-man Italy squad for UEFA Euro 2008. He made a substitute appearance in Italy's opening match of the tournament, a 3–0 defeat to the Netherlands, but was subsequently started in the remaining two group matches, a 1–1 draw against Romania, and a 2–0 win over France, and was praised in the Italian media for his performances along the left flank as Italy advanced from the group in second place. In the quarter-final match against eventual champions Spain, he helped the team keep a clean sheet and converted Italy's first penalty in the resulting shoot-out, which Spain won 4–2.

Following the tournament, Grosso was also first choice left-back in returning Italy manager Marcello Lippi's Azzurri squad for the 2009 FIFA Confederations Cup and the 2010 World Cup qualifying campaign. For the 2010 World Cup, he was called up to the pre-World Cup training camp alongside Juventus teammates Gianluigi Buffon, Giorgio Chiellini, Fabio Cannavaro, Nicola Legrottaglie, Mauro Camoranesi, Antonio Candreva, Claudio Marchisio and Vincenzo Iaquinta on 4–5 May, and was included in the 30-man preliminary squad announced on 11 May. However, in the second training camp, he was dropped, alongside Candreva.

== Managerial career ==
=== Early years ===
At the start of the 2013–14 season, it was announced Grosso would take up a coaching position in the Juventus youth system. On 11 March 2014, he was appointed as the new manager of the Juventus Primavera (U-19) youth team, following a string of poor performances under manager Andrea Zanchetta, who was transferred to another position within the youth system.

=== Bari ===
On 13 June 2017, Grosso was named as head coach of Bari in Serie B. The following April, his home was vandalised by fans of local rivals Pescara, who hanged a rooster, the mascot of his club. The team finished seventh and were eliminated from the playoffs by Cittadella.

=== Hellas Verona ===
Grosso was appointed manager of Hellas Verona on 21 June 2018, signing a two-year deal at the newly relegated Serie B club. He was sacked the following May, after a shock 3–2 home loss to relegation-threatened Livorno.

=== Brescia ===
On 5 November 2019, Grosso was appointed as the manager of Serie A club Brescia. He was sacked on 2 December after three straight defeats without a single goal.

=== Sion ===
Grosso was appointed the manager of Swiss Super League side Sion on 25 August 2020. He was sacked on 5 March 2021, after a 3–0 home loss to Lugano as Sion sat in last place in the league.

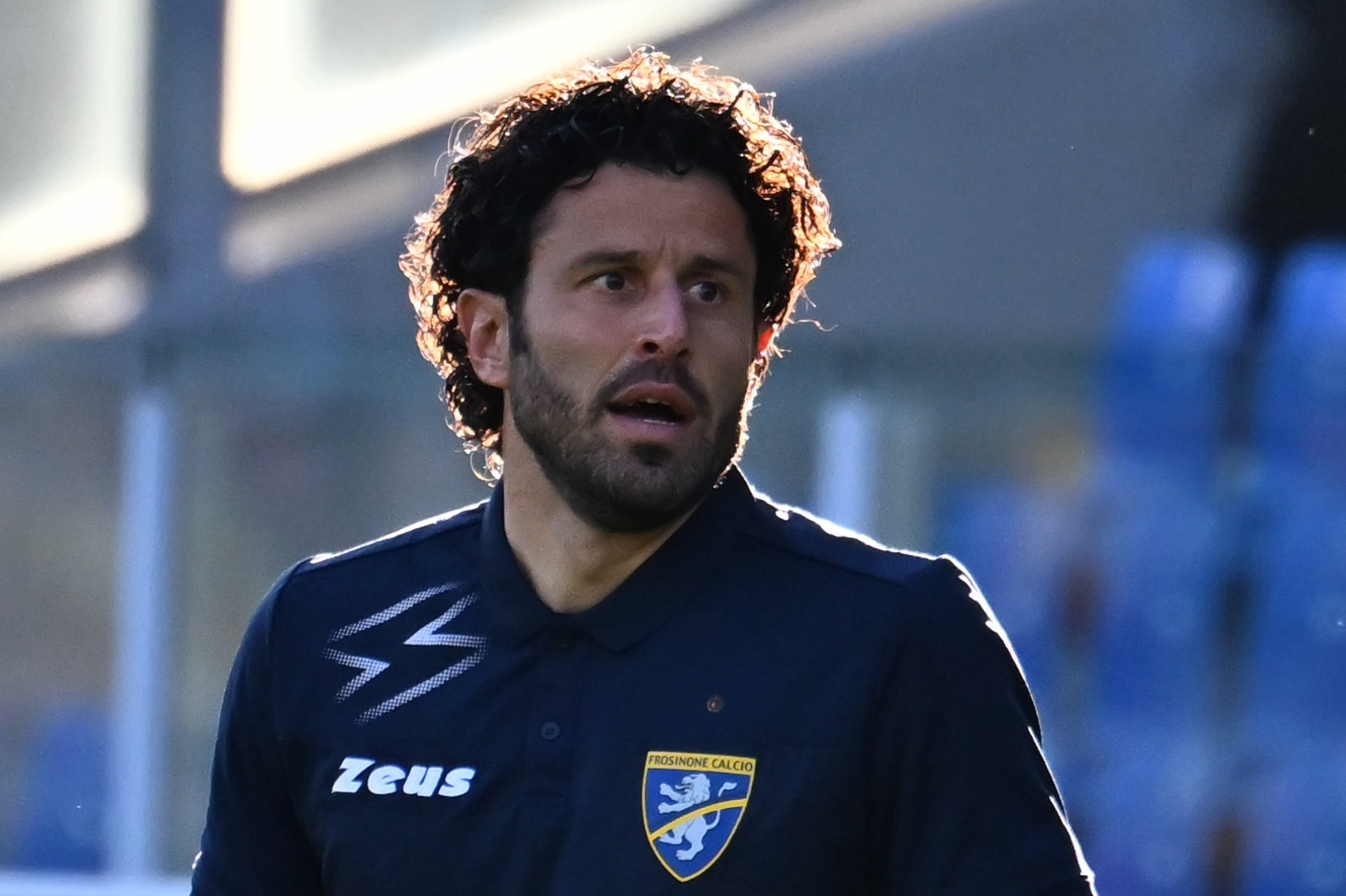
Grosso managing Frosinone in 2023

=== Frosinone ===
On 23 March 2021, Grosso was appointed as the manager of Frosinone. He won the 2022–23 Serie B, after which his contract expired; he eventually chose to depart from Frosinone, who instead appointed Eusebio Di Francesco in charge for the following Serie A campaign for the club.

=== Lyon ===
On 16 September 2023, Grosso was unveiled as the new manager of Ligue 1 club Lyon, a club at which he formerly played, replacing Laurent Blanc, who was fired 8 days prior. On 29 October 2023, prior to an away match against rivals Marseille at the Stade Vélodrome, Grosso suffered a facial injury due to shards of broken glass hitting his face after the Lyon bus was pelted with stones on its way to the stadium. He received medical treatment due to heavy bleeding. The match was subsequently postponed by the officials.

Following a short tenure that saw Lyon failing to improve in its results and lying at the bottom of the league table, Grosso was ultimately dismissed from his coaching position on 30 November 2023.

=== Sassuolo ===
On 3 June 2024, Grosso was appointed as the manager of Serie B team Sassuolo.

On 12 April 2025, he obtained promotion to Serie A for Sassuolo, with five days to spare.

=== Fiorentina ===
On 8 June 2026, he was appointed as head coach of Serie A club Fiorentina, signing a two-year contract.

Following three losses in a row at the start of the season, Grosso was dismissed as first-team head coach by Fiorentina on 7 September 2026.

== Style of play ==
A former attacking left back, Grosso was a physical, quick, and energetic player, who was sound both defensively and offensively due to his work-rate, attacking prowess, technique, and stamina. He excelled as an offensive–minded left-back. A versatile footballer, regarded as one of the top Italian full-backs of his generation, he was also possessed accurate crossing ability, which allowed him to be deployed as a winger or as an attacking wing-back on either flank throughout his career, despite being naturally left-footed. Unusually for a defender, he was also a free kick, penalty and corner kick specialist, responsibilities usually held by a striker or midfielder.

== Personal life ==
Grosso is married to Jessica Repetto. They have two sons, born in 2006 and 2009. His eldest son Filippo currently plays for Frosinone in Serie B. Grosso's father-in-law is the former footballer Giorgio Repetto.

== Career statistics ==
=== Club ===
Club	Season	League			National cup (Note: Includes Coppa Italia, Coupe de France)		League cup (Note: Includes Coupe de la Ligue)		Europe		Other		Total	
Club	Season	Division	Apps	Goals	Apps	Goals	Apps	Goals	Apps	Goals	Apps	Goals	Apps	Goals
Renato Curi	1994–95	Eccellenza	18	2	—		—		—		—		18	2
Renato Curi	1995–96	Eccellenza	28	11	—		—		—		—		28	11
Renato Curi	1996–97	Eccellenza	30	15	—		—		—		—		30	15
Renato Curi	1997–98	Eccellenza	32	19	—		—		—		—		32	19
Renato Curi	1998–99	Serie D	17	8	—		—		—		—		17	8
Renato Curi	Total		125	55	—		—		—		—		125	55
Chieti	1998–99	Serie C2	12	4	—		—		—		—		12	4
Chieti	1999–2000	Serie C2	25	4	—		—		—		—		25	4
Chieti	2000–01	Serie C2	31	9	—		—		—		—		31	9
Chieti	Total		68	17	—		—		—		—		68	17
Perugia	2001–02	Serie A	24	1	4	0	—		—		—		28	1
Perugia	2002–03	Serie A	30	4	5	0	—		—		—		35	4
Perugia	2003–04	Serie A	13	2	4	0	—		11	0	—		28	2
Perugia	Total		67	7	13	0	—		11	0	—		91	7
Palermo	2003–04	Serie B	21	1	—		—		—		—		21	1
Palermo	2004–05	Serie A	36	1	2	0	—		—		—		38	1
Palermo	2005–06	Serie A	33	0	6	0	—		8 (Note: Appearances in UEFA Cup)	0	—		47	0
Palermo	Total		90	2	8	0	—		8	0	—		106	2
Inter	2006–07	Serie A	23	2	5	1	—		6 (Note: Appearances in UEFA Champions League)	0	1 (Note: Appearance in Supercoppa Italiana)	0	35	3
Lyon	2007–08	Ligue 1	30	1	5	0	1	0	7	0	1 (Note: Appearance in Trophée des Champions)	0	44	1
Lyon	2008–09	Ligue 1	22	1	3	0	1	0	6	0	1	0	33	1
Lyon	2009–10	Ligue 1	1	0	—		—		—		—		1	0
Lyon	Total		53	2	8	0	2	0	13	0	2	0	78	2
Juventus	2009–10	Serie A	26	2	2	0	—		8 (Note: Six appearances in UEFA Champions League, two appearances in UEFA Europa League)	0	—		36	2
Juventus	2010–11	Serie A	19	0	2	0	—		0	0	—		21	0
Juventus	2011–12	Serie A	2	0	0	0	—		—		—		2	0
Juventus	Total		47	2	4	0	—		8	0	—		59	2
Career total			473	87	38	1	2	0	46	0	3	0	562	88

=== International ===
Appearances by national team and year

National team	Year	Apps	Goals
Italy	2003	3	0
Italy	2004	0	0
Italy	2005	11	1
Italy	2006	11	1
Italy	2007	3	1
Italy	2008	10	0
Italy	2009	10	1
Total		48	4

International goals

Scores and results list Italy's goal tally first.

No.	Date	Venue	Opponent	Score	Result	Competition
1.	3 September 2005	Hampden Park, Glasgow, Scotland	Scotland	1–1	1–1	2006 FIFA World Cup qualification
2.	4 July 2006	Westfalenstadion, Dortmund, Germany	Germany	1–0	2–0	2006 FIFA World Cup
3.	13 October 2007	Stadio Luigi Ferraris, Genoa, Italy	Georgia	2–0	2–0	UEFA Euro 2008 qualifying
4.	9 September 2009	Stadio Olimpico di Torino, Turin, Italy	Bulgaria	1–0	2–0	2010 FIFA World Cup qualification

=== Managerial statistics ===
As of match played 7 September 2026

Managerial record by team and tenure
Team	From	To	Record							
Team	From	To	G	W	D	L	GF	GA	GD	Win %
Bari	13 June 2017	18 June 2018	46	20	14	12	64	55	+9	43.48
Hellas Verona	21 June 2018	1 May 2019	36	13	13	10	51	45	+6	36.11
Brescia	5 November 2019	2 December 2019	3	0	0	3	0	10	−10	0.00
Sion	25 August 2020	5 March 2021	25	5	10	10	30	40	−10	20.00
Frosinone	23 March 2021	17 June 2023	86	42	25	19	134	81	+53	48.84
Lyon	16 September 2023	30 November 2023	7	1	2	4	6	11	−5	14.29
Sassuolo	3 June 2024	8 June 2026	81	42	14	25	130	98	+32	51.85
Fiorentina	8 June 2026	6 September 2026	4	1	0	3	5	10	−5	25.00
Total			288	124	78	86	420	350	+70	43.06

== Honours ==
=== Player ===
Perugia

- UEFA Intertoto Cup: 2003

Inter Milan

- Serie A: 2006–07
- Supercoppa Italiana: 2006

Lyon

- Ligue 1: 2007–08
- Coupe de France: 2007–08
- Trophée des Champions: 2007

Juventus

- Serie A: 2011–12

Italy

- FIFA World Cup: 2006

Orders

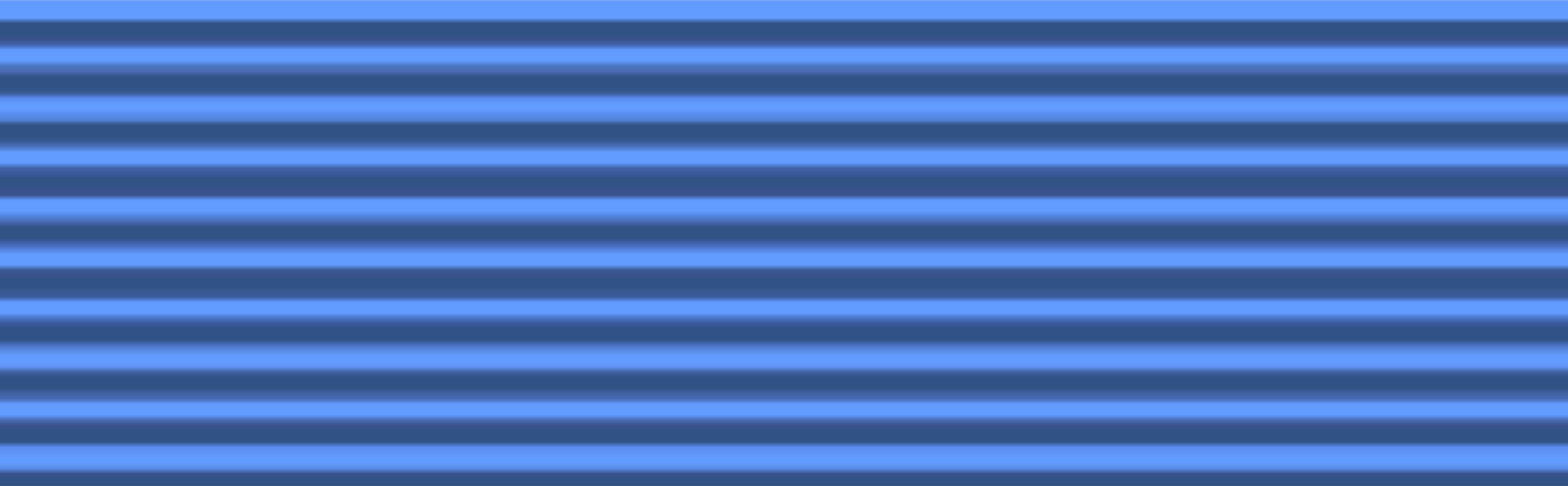
- CONI: Golden Collar of Sports Merit: 2006

- 4th Class / Officer: Ufficiale Ordine al Merito della Repubblica Italiana: 2006

=== Manager ===
Frosinone

- Serie B: 2022–23

Sassuolo

- Serie B: 2024–25

Individual

- Silver Bench: 2022–23
