= Massimiliano Fusani =

Italian footballer

Personal information
- Full name: Massimiliano Fusani
- Date of birth: 17 July 1979 (age 47)
- Place of birth: Aosta, Italy
- Height: 1.76 m (5 ft 9 1/2 in)
- Position: Midfielder

Senior career*
Years	Team	Apps	(Gls)
1999–2001	Inter	0	(0)
1999–2001	→ Brescello (loan)	58	(7)
2001–2005	Perugia	66	(5)
2005	→ Chievo (loan)	6	(0)
2005–2006	Modena	13	(0)
2006–2007	Bari	37	(0)
2007–2011	Sassuolo	101	(3)
- * Club domestic league appearances and goals as of 8 August 2008

Massimiliano Fusani (born 17 July 1979 in Aosta) is an Italian former professional footballer who played as central midfielder.

He started playing football as goalkeeper, wanting to imitate his idol Dino Zoff. His goalkeeping career did not last very long, however. When he was 16, he moved to Inter.

He was loaned to Brescello then sold to Perugia in Co-ownership deal.

== Honours ==
- Intertoto Cup 2003 with Perugia
- Serie C1 2007–08 with Sassuolo
