= Jean Onana =

Cameroonian footballer (born 2000)

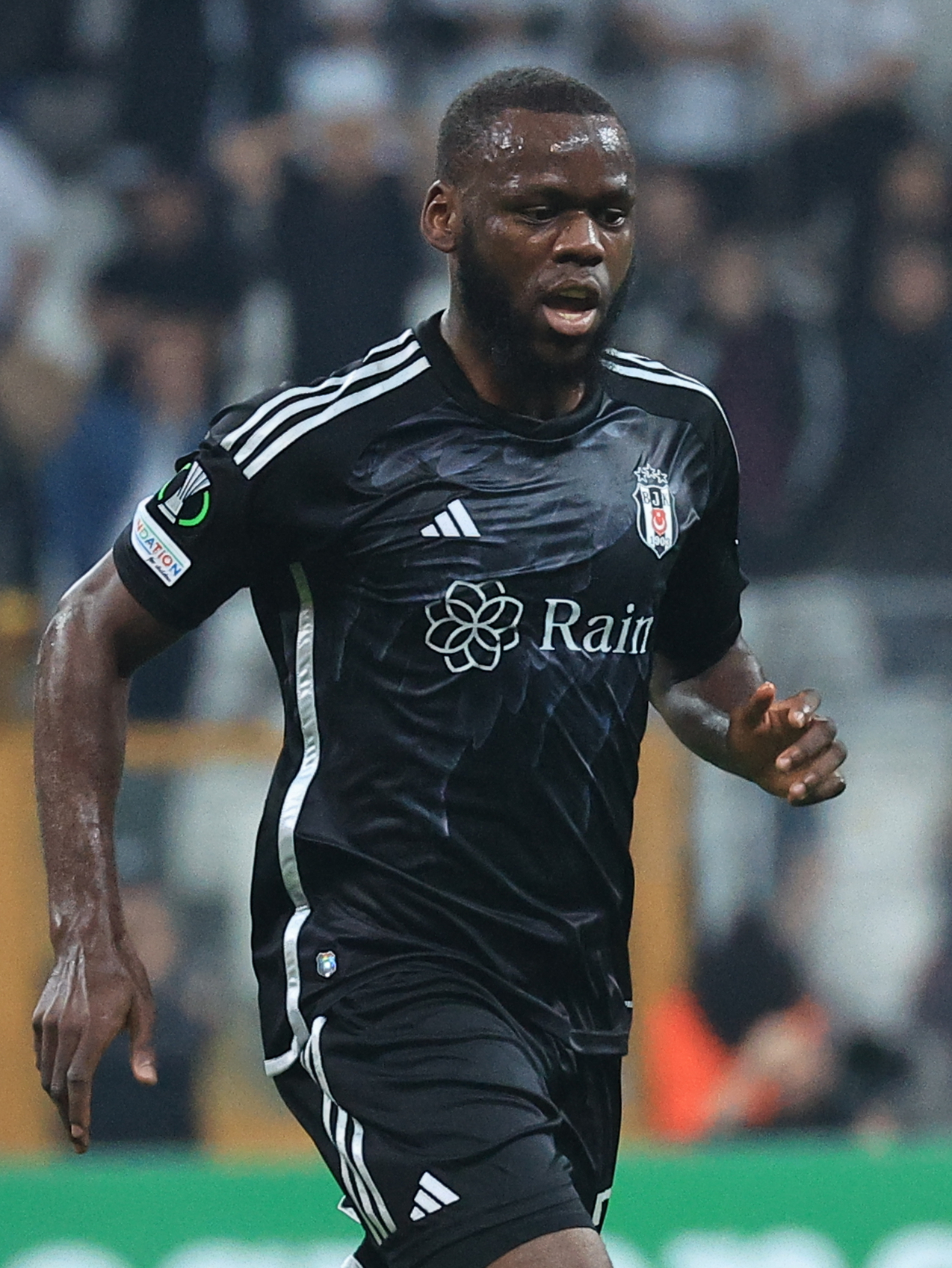
- Onana with Beşiktaş in 2023

Personal information
- Full name: Jean Emile Junior Onana Onana
- Date of birth: 8 January 2000 (age 26)
- Place of birth: Yaoundé, Cameroon
- Height: 1.89 m (6 ft 2 in)
- Position: Defensive midfielder

Youth career
- –2019: Nkufo Academy
- 2019: → Leixões (loan)

Senior career*
Years	Team	Apps	(Gls)
2019–2020	Leixões	1	(0)
2020–2021	Lille B	1	(0)
2020–2021	Lille	1	(0)
2020–2021	→ Mouscron (loan)	28	(2)
2021–2022	Bordeaux	26	(3)
2022–2023	Lens	21	(0)
2023–2026	Beşiktaş	7	(0)
2024	→ Marseille (loan)	13	(1)
2025–2026	→ Genoa (loan)	12	(0)

International career^{‡}
2020–2025	Cameroon	14	(0)
Medal record
Men's football
Representing Cameroon
Africa Cup of Nations
Third place	2021 Cameroon
- * Club domestic league appearances and goals as of 25 August 2026 ‡ National team caps and goals as of 9 January 2026

Jean Emile Junior Onana Onana (born 8 January 2000) is a Cameroonian professional footballer who plays as a defensive midfielder.

== Club career ==
On 31 January 2020, Onana joined Lille from Leixões. Onana made his professional debut with Lille in a 2–1 Ligue 1 loss to Marseille on 16 February 2020. In August 2020, he joined Belgian club Mouscron along with some Lille players on loan, where he received a red card in a Division A match defeat to Kortrijk on 13 September.

On 30 August 2021, Onana moved to Ligue 1 club Bordeaux on a five-year contract. On 1 September 2022, he signed for his former club Lille's rivals Lens on a five-year contract. He made his first appearance with Lens on 4 September 2022 against Reims.

On 21 July 2023 Onana moved to Süper Lig club Beşiktaş.

On 11 December 2023, it was officially announced that Onana has been excluded from the Beşiktaş squad along with Vincent Aboubakar, Valentin Rosier, Rachid Ghezzal and Eric Bailly due to poor performance and incompatibility within the team.

On 8 January 2024, Beşiktaş sent Onana on loan to Ligue 1 club Marseille until the end of the season, with an option to make the move permanent.

On 30 January 2025, Beşiktaş sent Onana on loan to Serie A club Genoa until the end of the season, with an option to make the move permanent. On 1 September 2025, Onana returned to Genoa on loan with a conditional obligation to buy. Upon his return from loan, Onana's contract with Beşiktaş was mutually terminated on 25 August 2026.

== International career ==
Onana made his Cameroon national team debut on 8 October 2020 in a friendly against Japan.

He was part of the Cameroonian squad for the 2021 Africa Cup of Nations. He made his Africa Cup of Nations debut as a late substitute in the third group-stage match against Cape Verde. He then came on as a substitute in the round of 16 against the Comoros and in the semi-final defeat to Egypt. He started in the third-place play-off, which Cameroon won on penalties against Burkina Faso.

Initially expected to be included in the squad for the 2022 FIFA World Cup in Qatar, he was ultimately not selected by Cameroon head coach Rigobert Song.

Onana was included in the list of Cameroonian players selected by coach David Pagou to participate in the 2025 Africa Cup of Nations.

== Personal life ==
In the early morning of 20 May 2024, Onana and OM teammate Faris Moumbagna were the victims of an armed robbery attempt while they were in their cars as they were leaving La Commanderie. Although neither were injured, two bullet holes were found on the driver's door on one of the vehicles.

He's unrelated to André Onana despite sharing same surname.

== Career statistics ==
=== Club ===
As of match played 26 October 2025

Appearances and goals by club, season and competition
Club	Season	League			National cup (Note: Includes Belgian Cup, Coupe de France, Turkish Cup)		Europe		Total	
Club	Season	Division	Apps	Goals	Apps	Goals	Apps	Goals	Apps	Goals
Leixões	2018–19	Liga Portugal 2	1	0	—		—		1	0
Lille	2019–20	Ligue 1	1	0	0	0	0	0	1	0
Mouscron (loan)	2020–21	Belgian Pro League	28	2	1	0	—		29	2
Bordeaux	2021–22	Ligue 1	23	3	0	0	—		23	3
Bordeaux	2022–23	Ligue 2	3	0	0	0	—		3	0
Bordeaux	Total		26	3	0	0	—		26	3
Lens	2022–23	Ligue 1	21	0	2	0	—		23	0
Beşiktaş	2023–24	Süper Lig	4	0	0	0	6 (Note: Appearances in UEFA Europa Conference League)	0	10	0
Beşiktaş	2024–25	Süper Lig	3	0	1	0	2 (Note: Appearances in UEFA Europa League)	0	6	0
Beşiktaş	Total		7	0	1	0	8	0	16	0
Marseille (loan)	2023–24	Ligue 1	13	1	1	0	0	0	14	1
Genoa (loan)	2024–25	Serie A	9	0	0	0	—		9	0
Genoa (loan)	2025–26	Serie A	1	0	0	0	—		1	0
Genoa (loan)	Total		10	0	0	0	—		10	0
Career total			107	4	5	0	8	0	120	4

=== International ===
As of match played 9 January 2026

Appearances and goals by national team and year
National team	Year	Apps	Goals
Cameroon	2020	1	0
Cameroon	2021	2	0
Cameroon	2022	7	0
Cameroon	2025	3	0
Cameroon	2026	1	0
Total		14	0

== Honours ==
Beşiktaş

- Turkish Super Cup: 2024
