= 2020–21 Lille OSC season =

Lille
2020–21 season
- Owner: Merlyn Partners SCSp
- President: Olivier Létang
- Head coach: Christophe Galtier
- Stadium: Stade Pierre-Mauroy
- Ligue 1: 1st
- Coupe de France: Round of 16
- UEFA Europa League: Round of 32
- Top goalscorer: League: Burak Yılmaz (16); All: Burak Yılmaz (18)
Home colours	Away colours	Third colours

The 2020–21 season was the 77th season in the existence of Lille OSC and the club's 21st consecutive season in the top flight of French football. In addition to the domestic league, Lille participated in this season's edition of the Coupe de France and the UEFA Europa League. The season covered the period from 1 July 2020 to 30 June 2021.

On 23 May 2021, with a win over Angers on the final day of the season, Lille were crowned league champions. The achievement was very surprising and was considered an upset, as Paris Saint-Germain had always been the favourites to win Ligue 1 for the fourth time in a row. It was Lille's fourth top-flight title in the professional era and their first since 2010–11, when Eden Hazard was named the competition's player of the year. Lille's points tally of 83 was the best in their history and they only lost three matches all season.

== Players ==
=== First-team squad ===
As of 1 February 2021

Note: Flags indicate national team as defined under FIFA eligibility rules; some limited exceptions apply. Players may hold more than one non-FIFA nationality.

No.	Pos.	Nation	Player
1	GK	GRE	Orestis Karnezis
2	DF	TUR	Zeki Çelik
3	DF	POR	Tiago Djaló
5	DF	NED	Sven Botman
6	DF	POR	José Fonte (captain)
7	FW	FRA	Jonathan Bamba
8	MF	POR	Xeka
9	FW	CAN	Jonathan David
10	MF	FRA	Jonathan Ikoné
11	FW	BRA	Luiz Araújo
12	MF	TUR	Yusuf Yazıcı
15	MF	MEX	Eugenio Pizzuto

No.	Pos.	Nation	Player
16	GK	FRA	Mike Maignan
17	FW	TUR	Burak Yılmaz
18	MF	POR	Renato Sanches
19	FW	FRA	Isaac Lihadji
21	MF	FRA	Benjamin André (vice-captain)
22	FW	USA	Timothy Weah
24	MF	FRA	Boubakary Soumaré
26	DF	FRA	Jérémy Pied
28	DF	MOZ	Reinildo Mandava
29	DF	CRO	Domagoj Bradarić
30	GK	FRA	Lucas Chevalier

=== Out on loan ===
Note: Flags indicate national team as defined under FIFA eligibility rules; some limited exceptions apply. Players may hold more than one non-FIFA nationality.

No.	Pos.	Nation	Player
—	GK	BRA	Léo Jardim (on loan at Boavista)
—	GK	SVK	Adam Jakubech (on loan at Kortrijk)
—	GK	BFA	Hervé Koffi (on loan at Mouscron)
—	DF	MAR	Saad Agouzoul (on loan at Mouscron)
—	DF	CIV	Kouadio-Yves Dabila (on loan at Mouscron)
—	DF	FRA	Eric Bocat (on loan at Mouscron)
—	DF	FRA	Scotty Sadzoute (on loan at Pau FC)
—	DF	FRA	Adama Soumaoro (on loan at Bologna)
—	DF	SEN	Cheikh Niasse (on loan at Panathinaikos)
—	MF	ANG	Capita (on loan at Mouscron)

No.	Pos.	Nation	Player
—	MF	ENG	Angel Gomes (on loan at Boavista)
—	MF	MLI	Rominigue Kouamé (on loan at Troyes)
—	MF	BRA	Thiago Maia (on loan at Flamengo)
—	MF	FRA	Darly N'Landu (on loan at Mouscron)
—	MF	CMR	Jean Onana (on loan at Mouscron)
—	MF	ANG	Show (on loan at Boavista)
—	FW	CAN	Charles-Andreas Brym (on loan at Mouscron)
—	FW	ITA	Luigi Liguori (on loan at Lecco)
—	FW	ITA	Ciro Palmieri (on loan at Fermana)
—	FW	FRA	Fadiga Ouattara (on loan at Valencia)

== Transfers ==
=== In ===
No.	Pos.	Player	Transferred from	Fee	Date	Ref.
19	FW	Isaac Lihadji (FRA)	Marseille B (FRA)		2 July 2020	
–	MF	Capita (ANG)	Trofense (POR)		2 July 2020	
5	DF	Sven Botman (NED)	Jong Ajax (NED)		31 July 2020	
17	FW	Burak Yılmaz (TUR)	Beşiktaş (TUR)	Free	31 July 2020	
15	MF	Eugenio Pizzuto (MEX)	Pachuca (MEX)		1 August 2020	
–	MF	Angel Gomes (ENG)	Manchester United (ENG)		9 August 2020	
9	FW	Jonathan David (CAN)	Gent (BEL)	€30M	11 August 2020	
–	FW	Luigi Liguori (ITA)	Napoli (ITA)		1 September 2020	
–	FW	Ciro Palmieri (ITA)	Napoli (ITA)		1 September 2020	
1	GK	Orestis Karnezis (GRE)	Napoli (ITA)		4 September 2020	

=== Out ===
No.	Pos.	Player	Transferred to	Fee	Date	Ref.
20	MF	Nicolás Gaitán (ARG)	End of contract	N/A	1 July 2020	
9	FW	Loïc Rémy (FRA)	End of contract	N/A	3 July 2020	
–	DF	Júnior Alonso (PAR)	Atlético Mineiro (BRA)	€3M	3 July 2020	
7	FW	Victor Osimhen (NGA)	Napoli (ITA)	€50M + €10M variables	31 July 2020	
4	DF	Gabriel (BRA)	Arsenal (ENG)	€30M	1 September 2020	

==== Loans out ====
No.	Pos.	Player	Loaned to	Date from	Date until	Ref.
–	MF	Darly N'Landu (FRA)	Mouscron (BEL)	31 July 2020	End of season	
–	GK	Hervé Koffi (BFA)	Mouscron (BEL)	1 August 2020	End of season	
–	MF	Angel Gomes (ENG)	Boavista (POR)	4 August 2020	End of season	
–	DF	Kouadio-Yves Dabila (CIV)	Mouscron (BEL)	17 August 2020	End of season	
–	MF	Capita (ANG)	Mouscron (BEL)	11 September 2020	End of season	
–	FW	Luigi Liguori (ITA)	Fermana (ITA)	19 September 2020	End of season	
–	FW	Ciro Palmieri (ITA)	Fermana (ITA)	19 September 2020	End of season	

== Pre-season and friendlies ==
Win Draw Loss Fixtures

18 July 2020 Friendly	Mouscron	1–2	Lille	Mouscron, Belgium
18:00 CEST (UTC+2)	Cedric 79'	Report	Xeka 3' (pen.); Simbakoli 76'	Stadium: Stade Le Canonnier

25 July 2020 Friendly	Club Brugge	2–0	Lille	Bruges, Belgium
18:00 CEST (UTC+2)	Rits 11'; Schrijvers 79'	Report		Stadium: Jan Breydel Stadium

31 July 2020 Friendly	Kortrijk	Cancelled	Lille	Kortrijk, Belgium
16:00 CEST (UTC+2)				Stadium: Guldensporen Stadion

1 August 2020 Friendly	Lille	2–0	Anderlecht	Camphin-en-Pévèle, France
15:00 CEST (UTC+2)	Luiz Araújo 50', 55'	Report		Stadium: Domaine de Luchin; Attendance: 0

8 August 2020 Friendly	AZ	2–1	Lille	Alkmaar, Netherlands
15:30 CEST (UTC+2)	Sugawara 73'; Ouwejan 84'	Report	Pied 58'	Stadium: AFAS Stadion; Attendance: 0 Referee: Jaafar Aaffouallah

16 August 2020 Friendly	Lille	1–2	Brest	Villeneuve-d'Ascq, France
17:00 CEST (UTC+2)	David 35'	Report	Belkebla 17'; Chardonnet (yellow card) 58'; Battocchio 84'	Stadium: Stade Pierre-Mauroy

== Competitions ==
=== Overall record ===
Competition	First match	Last match	Starting round	Final position	Record							
Competition	First match	Last match	Starting round	Final position	Pld	W	D	L	GF	GA	GD	Win %
Ligue 1	22 August 2020	23 May 2021	Matchday 1	Winners	38	24	11	3	64	23	+41	63.16
Coupe de France	10 February 2021	17 March 2021	Round of 64	Round of 16	3	2	0	1	4	4	+0	66.67
UEFA Europa League	22 October 2020	25 February 2021	Group stage	Round of 32	8	3	2	3	16	12	+4	37.50
Total					49	29	13	7	84	39	+45	59.18

Source: Soccerway

=== Ligue 1 ===
==== League table ====
Pos	Team	Pld	W	D	L	GF	GA	GD	Pts	Qualification or relegation
1	Lille (C)	38	24	11	3	64	23	+41	83	Qualification for the Champions League group stage
2	Paris Saint-Germain	38	26	4	8	86	28	+58	82	Qualification for the Champions League group stage
3	Monaco	38	24	6	8	76	42	+34	78	Qualification for the Champions League third qualifying round
4	Lyon	38	22	10	6	81	43	+38	76	Qualification for the Europa League group stage (Note: Since the winners of the 2020–21 Coupe de France, Paris Saint-Germain, qualified for European competition based on league position, the Europa League group stage spot reserved for the cup winners was passed to the fifth-placed team, and the Europa Conference League play-off round spot was passed to the sixth-placed team.)
5	Marseille	38	16	12	10	54	47	+7	60	Qualification for the Europa League group stage

Source: Ligue 1
Rules for classification: 1) Points; 2) Goal difference; 3) Goals scored; 4) Head-to-head goal difference; 5) Fairplay ranking.
(C) Champions

==== Results summary ====
Overall								Home						Away					
Pld	W	D	L	GF	GA	GD	Pts	W	D	L	GF	GA	GD	W	D	L	GF	GA	GD
38	24	11	3	64	23	+41	83	10	7	2	28	11	+17	14	4	1	36	12	+24

Source: Ligue 1

==== Results by round ====
Round	1	2	3	4	5	6	7	8	9	10	11	12	13	14	15	16	17	18	19	20	21	22	23	24	25	26	27	28	29	30	31	32	33	34	35	36	37	38
Ground	H	A	H	A	H	A	H	A	H	A	H	A	H	H	A	H	A	H	A	H	A	H	A	A	H	A	H	H	A	H	A	A	H	A	H	A	H	A
Result	D	W	W	D	W	W	W	D	D	L	W	D	W	W	W	D	W	L	W	W	W	W	W	W	D	W	D	W	D	L	W	W	D	W	W	W	D	W
Position	8	5	4	5	2	2	1	2	2	2	2	2	2	1	1	1	2	3	3	2	2	1	1	1	1	1	1	1	1	2	1	1	1	1	1	1	1	1
Points	1	4	7	8	11	14	17	18	19	19	22	23	26	29	32	33	36	36	39	42	45	48	51	54	55	58	59	62	63	63	66	69	70	73	76	79	80	83

Source: Ligue 1
A = Away; H = Home; W = Win; D = Draw; L = Loss

==== Matches ====
The league fixtures were announced on 9 July 2020.

22 August 2020 1	Lille	1–1	Rennes	Villeneuve-d'Ascq
21:00 CEST (UTC+2)	Bamba 40'; Mandava (red card) 43'	Report	Boey (red card) 35'; Da Silva 74'; Tait (yellow card) 88'	Stadium: Stade Pierre-Mauroy; Attendance: 3,975; Referee: Clément Turpin

30 August 2020 2	Reims	0–1	Lille	Reims
13:00 CEST (UTC+2)	Faes (yellow card) 75'; Hornby (yellow card) 80'; Chavalerin (yellow card) 81'; Rajković (yellow card) 90'	Report	Bamba 32'; Çelik (yellow card) 34'	Stadium: Stade Auguste-Delaune; Attendance: 3,614; Referee: Stéphanie Frappart

13 September 2020 3	Lille	1–0	Metz	Villeneuve-d'Ascq
13:00 CEST (UTC+2)	Pied (yellow card) 31'; Bradarić (yellow card) 57'; André (yellow card) 80'; Çelik (yellow card) 84'; Luiz Araújo 88'	Report	Maïga (yellow card) 20'; Bronn (yellow card) 36'; Pajot (yellow card) 43'; Centonze (yellow card) 75'	Stadium: Stade Pierre-Mauroy; Attendance: 4,162; Referee: Jérémie Pignard

20 September 2020 4	Marseille	1–1	Lille	Marseille
21:00 CEST (UTC+2)	Nagatomo (yellow card) 21'; Thauvin (yellow card) 58'; Álvaro (yellow card) 65'; Germain 85'	Report	Luiz Araújo 47'; André (yellow card) 50'; Bradarić (yellow card) 58'; Sanches (yellow card) 80'	Stadium: Stade Vélodrome; Attendance: 983; Referee: Hakim Ben El Hadj

25 September 2020 5	Lille	2–0	Nantes	Villeneuve-d'Ascq
21:00 CEST (UTC+2)	Pallois 43' (o.g.); Yılmaz 87' (pen.)	Report	Appiah (yellow card) 85'; Girotto (yellow card) 90+4'	Stadium: Stade Pierre-Mauroy; Attendance: 4,012; Referee: Willy Delajod

4 October 2020 6	Strasbourg	0–3	Lille	Strasbourg
15:00 CEST (UTC+2)	Djiku (yellow card) 42'	Report	Çelik 21'; Sanches 53'; Luiz Araújo (yellow card) 59'; Yılmaz 68'	Stadium: Stade de la Meinau; Attendance: 4,988; Referee: Mikael Lesage

18 October 2020 7	Lille	4–0	Lens	Villeneuve-d'Ascq
21:00 CEST (UTC+2)	Yılmaz 11'; Bamba 47'; Ikoné 69'; Yazıcı 79'	Report	Cahuzac (yellow card) 18'; Gradit (yellow card) 30' (yellow-red card) 57'; Michelin (red card) 75'	Stadium: Stade Pierre-Mauroy; Attendance: 0 Referee: François Letexier

25 October 2020 8	Nice	1–1	Lille	Nice
17:00 CET (UTC+1)	Lees-Melou (yellow card) 10'; Dolberg 50'	Report	Botman (yellow card) 43'; Yılmaz 58', (yellow card) 78'; Luiz Araújo (yellow card) 64'; Çelik (yellow card) 75'; Fonte (yellow card) 84'; Maignan (yellow card) 89'	Stadium: Allianz Riviera; Attendance: 1,000; Referee: Frank Schneider

1 November 2020 9	Lille	1–1	Lyon	Villeneuve-d'Ascq
21:00 CET (UTC+1)	Bamba 22'; Fonte (yellow card) 28'; Yılmaz (yellow card) 41'; Soumaoro (yellow card) 89'	Report	Marcelo (yellow card) 3' (yellow-red card) 50'; Toko Ekambi (yellow card) 33'; Çelik 41' (o.g.)	Stadium: Stade Pierre-Mauroy; Attendance: 0 Referee: Mikael Lesage

8 November 2020 10	Brest	3–2	Lille	Brest
13:00 CET (UTC+1)	Pierre-Gabriel 15'; Perraud 19'; Cardona 42'; Chardonnet (yellow card) 52'; Mounié (yellow card) 56'; Larsonneur (yellow card) 87'; Faussurier (yellow card) 90'	Report	Yılmaz 45+3' (pen.), 57', (yellow card) 45+3'; Mandava (yellow card) 63'; Fonte (yellow card) 90+3'	Stadium: Stade Francis-Le Blé; Attendance: 0 Referee: Florent Batta

22 November 2020 11	Lille	4–0	Lorient	Villeneuve-d'Ascq
21:00 CET (UTC+1)	Yazıcı 29', 51'; Xeka (yellow card) 37'; Luiz Araújo 57'; David 90'	Report	Wissa (yellow card) 32'; Mendes (yellow card) 45+2'; Lemoine (yellow card) 79'	Stadium: Stade Pierre-Mauroy; Attendance: 0 Referee: Willy Delajod

29 November 2020 12	Saint-Étienne	1–1	Lille	Saint-Étienne
21:00 CET (UTC+1)	Neyou (yellow card) 16'; Khazri 33' (pen.); Camara (yellow card) 38'; Debuchy (yellow card) 52'; Kolodziejczak (yellow card) 67'	Report	Bradarić (yellow card) 28'; Ikoné 65'	Stadium: Stade Geoffroy-Guichard; Attendance: 0 Referee: Benoît Bastien

6 December 2020 13	Lille	2–1	Monaco	Villeneuve-d'Ascq
13:00 CET (UTC+1)	David 53'; Djaló (yellow card) 64'; Yazıcı 65'; Soumaré (yellow card) 90+2'; Weah (yellow card) 90+2'	Report	Pellegri 90'	Stadium: Stade Pierre-Mauroy; Attendance: 0 Referee: Jérôme Brisard

13 December 2020 14	Lille	2–1	Bordeaux	Villeneuve-d'Ascq
17:00 CET (UTC+1)	Bamba 17'; Fonte 45'	Report	De Préville (yellow card) 24'; Bašić 29'; Baysse (yellow card) 88'	Stadium: Stade Pierre-Mauroy; Attendance: 0 Referee: Eric Wattellier

16 December 2020 15	Dijon	0–2	Lille	Dijon
19:00 CET (UTC+1)		Report	Yazıcı 19'; Weah 90+3'	Stadium: Stade Gaston Gérard; Attendance: 0 Referee: Hakim Ben El Hadj

20 December 2020 16	Lille	0–0	Paris Saint-Germain	Villeneuve-d'Ascq
21:00 CET (UTC+1)		Report	Kehrer (yellow card) 6'; Kimpembe (yellow card) 19'	Stadium: Stade Pierre-Mauroy; Attendance: 0 Referee: François Letexier

23 December 2020 17	Montpellier	2–3	Lille	Montpellier
21:00 CET (UTC+1)	Sambia (yellow card) 50'; Laborde 57'; Ristić (yellow card) 66'; Delort 70'; Ferri (yellow card) 87'	Report	André (yellow card) 17'; Weah 23'; Ikoné 68' (pen.); Xeka (yellow card) 77'; Yılmaz 86'	Stadium: Stade de la Mosson; Attendance: 0 Referee: Clément Turpin

6 January 2021 18	Lille	1–2	Angers	Villeneuve-d'Ascq
21:00 CET (UTC+1)	Yılmaz 42', (yellow card) 83'; Fonte (yellow card) 66'; André (yellow card) 68'	Report	Thomas 5', 10'; Bamba (yellow card) 90'	Stadium: Stade Pierre-Mauroy; Attendance: 0 Referee: Thomas Léonard

9 January 2021 19	Nîmes	0–1	Lille	Nîmes
21:00 CET (UTC+1)		Report	Bradarić (yellow card) 19'; Yılmaz 29'; Soumaré (yellow card) 34'; Xeka (yellow card) 90+1'	Stadium: Stade des Costières; Attendance: 0 Referee: Jérôme Brisard

17 January 2021 20	Lille	2–1	Reims	Villeneuve-d'Ascq
17:00 CET (UTC+1)	Bamba 48'; Djaló (yellow card) 85'; David 90+1'; Luiz Araújo (yellow card) 90+4'	Report	Cassamá (yellow card) 31'; Zeneli 36'	Stadium: Stade Pierre-Mauroy; Attendance: 0 Referee: Benoît Millot

24 January 2021 21	Rennes	0–1	Lille	Rennes
17:00 CET (UTC+1)	Nzonzi (yellow card) 22'; Grenier (yellow card) 40'	Report	David 16'; Çelik (yellow card) 34'; André (yellow card) 90+1'	Stadium: Roazhon Park; Attendance: 0 Referee: Eric Wattellier

31 January 2021 22	Lille	1–0	Dijon	Villeneuve-d'Ascq
17:00 CET (UTC+1)	Botman (yellow card) 13'; Yazıcı 29'; Xeka (yellow card) 82'	Report	Muzinga (yellow card) 75'; Chafik (yellow card) 90+3'	Stadium: Stade Pierre-Mauroy; Attendance: 0 Referee: Jérémie Pignard

3 February 2021 23	Bordeaux	0–3	Lille	Bordeaux
19:00 CET (UTC+1)	Ben Arfa (yellow card) 63'	Report	Xeka (yellow card) 45+1'; Yazıcı 54'; Weah 66'; Sanches (yellow card) 69'; David 89'	Stadium: Matmut Atlantique; Attendance: 0 Referee: Mikael Lesage

7 February 2021 24	Nantes	0–2	Lille	Nantes
17:00 CET (UTC+1)	Coco (yellow card) 29'; Corchia (yellow card) 31'; Louza (yellow card) 32'	Report	David 9', 83'	Stadium: Stade de la Beaujoire; Attendance: 0 Referee: Stéphanie Frappart

14 February 2021 25	Lille	0–0	Brest	Villeneuve-d'Ascq
17:00 CET (UTC+1)	Çelik (yellow card) 44'; Bamba (yellow card) 75'	Report	Belkebla (yellow card) 7'	Stadium: Stade Pierre-Mauroy; Attendance: 0 Referee: Bastien Dechepy

21 February 2021 26	Lorient	1–4	Lille	Lorient
17:00 CET (UTC+1)	Hergault 23'; Lemoine (yellow card) 61'; Monconduit (yellow card) 70'	Report	Gravillon 21' (o.g.); Fonte 38'; Ikoné 59'; Bradarić 90+1'	Stadium: Stade du Moustoir; Attendance: 0 Referee: Johan Hamel

28 February 2021 27	Lille	1–1	Strasbourg	Villeneuve-d'Ascq
17:05 CET (UTC+1)	Fonte 86'	Report	Ajorque 36'; Guilbert (yellow card) 44'; Aholou (yellow card) 90'	Stadium: Stade Pierre-Mauroy; Attendance: 0 Referee: Jérôme Brisard

3 March 2021 28	Lille	2–0	Marseille	Villeneuve-d'Ascq
21:00 CET (UTC+1)	David 90', 90+1'	Report	Gueye (yellow card) 90+1'	Stadium: Stade Pierre-Mauroy; Attendance: 0 Referee: Clément Turpin

14 March 2021 29	Monaco	0–0	Lille	Monaco
17:05 CET (UTC+1)	Tchouaméni (yellow card) 16'; Disasi (yellow card) 51'; Sidibé (yellow card) 82'	Report	Sanches (yellow card) 35'; André (yellow card) 83'; Luiz Araújo (yellow card) 84'	Stadium: Stade Louis II; Attendance: 0 Referee: Stéphanie Frappart

21 March 2021 30	Lille	1–2	Nîmes	Villeneuve-d'Ascq
17:05 CET (UTC+1)	Xeka 20'; Bamba (yellow card) 53'; Soumaré (yellow card) 80'	Report	Koné 12'; Ripart 45'	Stadium: Stade Pierre-Mauroy; Attendance: 0 Referee: Frank Schneider

3 April 2021 31	Paris Saint-Germain	0–1	Lille	Paris
17:00 CEST (UTC+2)	Paredes (yellow card) 17'; Gueye (yellow card) 19'; Neymar (yellow card) 48' (yellow-red card) 90'; Diallo (yellow card) 57'; Mbappé (yellow card) 85'	Report	Fonte (yellow card) 4'; David 20'; Djaló (yellow card) 36' (yellow-red card) 90+1'; André (yellow card) 87'	Stadium: Parc des Princes; Attendance: 0 Referee: Benoît Bastien

9 April 2021 32	Metz	0–2	Lille	Metz
21:00 CEST (UTC+2)	Leya Iseka (penalty missed) 17'; Kouyaté (yellow card) 65'; Sarr (yellow card) 76'	Report	Fonte (yellow card) 16'; Yılmaz (yellow card) 45+2', (goal) 60'; Çelik 89'	Stadium: Stade Saint-Symphorien; Attendance: 0 Referee: Clément Turpin

16 April 2021 33	Lille	1–1	Montpellier	Villeneuve-d'Ascq
21:00 CEST (UTC+2)	André (yellow card) 30'; Çelik (yellow card) 43'; Mandava (yellow card) 81'; Luiz Araújo 85'	Report	Mollet (yellow card) 14'; Delort 21'	Stadium: Stade Pierre-Mauroy; Attendance: 0 Referee: Benoît Millot

25 April 2021 34	Lyon	2–3	Lille	Décines-Charpieu
21:00 CEST (UTC+2)	Slimani 20'; Fonte 35' (o.g.)	Report	André (yellow card) 43'; Yılmaz 45+1', 85', (yellow card) 86'; David 60'; Yazıcı (yellow card) 90+1'	Stadium: Parc Olympique Lyonnais; Attendance: 0 Referee: François Letexier

1 May 2021 35	Lille	2–0	Nice	Villeneuve-d'Ascq
21:00 CEST (UTC+2)	Yılmaz 13'; Çelik (yellow card) 21', (goal) 56'; Xeka (yellow card) 87'	Report	Claude-Maurice (yellow card) 27'; Lotomba (yellow card) 34' (yellow-red card) 48'	Stadium: Stade Pierre-Mauroy; Attendance: 0 Referee: Amaury Delerue

7 May 2021 36	Lens	0–3	Lille	Lens
21:00 CEST (UTC+2)	Michelin (yellow card) 29' (yellow-red card) 35'; Fortès (yellow card) 67'	Report	Yılmaz 4' (pen.), 40'; Luiz Araújo (yellow card) 39'; David 60'; Fonte (yellow card) 65'	Stadium: Stade Bollaert-Delelis; Attendance: 0 Referee: Clément Turpin

16 May 2021 37	Lille	0–0	Saint-Étienne	Villeneuve-d'Ascq
21:00 CEST (UTC+2)	André (yellow card) 26'	Report	Neyou (yellow card) 21'; Khazri (yellow card) 47'	Stadium: Stade Pierre-Mauroy; Attendance: 0 Referee: Jérôme Brisard

23 May 2021 38	Angers	1–2	Lille	Angers
21:00 CEST (UTC+2)	Fulgini 90+1'	Report	David 10'; Yılmaz 45+1' (pen.); Sanches (yellow card) 75'; Çelik (yellow card) 78'	Stadium: Stade Raymond Kopa; Attendance: 0 Referee: Benoît Bastien

=== Coupe de France ===
10 February 2021 Round of 64	Dijon	0–1	Lille	Dijon
19:00 CET (UTC+1)	Chalá (yellow card) 64'	Report	Camara 15'	Stadium: Stade Gaston Gérard; Attendance: 0 Referee: Willy Delajod

7 March 2021 Round of 32	Gazélec Ajaccio	1–3	Lille	Ajaccio
18:30 CET (UTC+1)	Morgan (yellow card) 49'; Pollet 87'; Pineau (yellow card) 90+2'	Report	Durimel 9' (o.g.); Weah (yellow card) 53'; Djaló (yellow card) 54'; Xeka 71'; Lopy 84' (o.g.)	Stadium: Stade Ange Casanova; Attendance: 0 Referee: Benoît Millot

17 March 2021 Round of 16	Paris Saint-Germain	3–0	Lille	Paris
17:45 CET (UTC+1)	Rafinha (yellow card) 3'; Icardi 9'; Mbappé 41' (pen.), 90+3', (yellow card) 77'; Gueye (yellow card) 64'	Report	Bradarić (yellow card) 18'; Djaló (yellow card) 40'; Xeka (yellow card) 44'; Yazıcı (penalty missed) 78'; Ikoné (yellow card) 80'	Stadium: Parc des Princes; Attendance: 0 Referee: Willy Delajod

=== UEFA Europa League ===
==== Group stage ====
The group stage draw was held on 2 October 2020.

Pos	Team	Pld	W	D	L	GF	GA	GD	Pts	Qualification	MIL	LOSC	SPP	CEL
1	(Italy) Milan	6	4	1	1	12	7	+5	13	Advance to knockout phase	—	0–3	3–0	4–2
2	(France) Lille	6	3	2	1	14	8	+6	11	Advance to knockout phase	1–1	—	2–1	2–2
3	(Czech Republic) Sparta Prague	6	2	0	4	10	12	−2	6		0–1	1–4	—	4–1
4	(Scotland) Celtic	6	1	1	4	10	19	−9	4		1–3	3–2	1–4	—

Source: UEFA
Rules for classification: Group stage tiebreakers

22 October 2020 1	Sparta Prague (Czech Republic)	1–4	(France) Lille	Prague, Czech Republic
21:00 CEST (UTC+2)	Krejčí (red card) 23'; Dočkal 47'; Heča (yellow card) 53'; Sáček (yellow card) 55'; Dočkal (yellow card) 64'	Report	Botman (yellow card) 31'; Yazıcı 45+1', 60', 75'; Bradarić (yellow card) 45+3'; Sanches (yellow card) 53'; Ikoné 66'; Bamba (yellow card) 74'	Stadium: Stadion Letná; Attendance: 0 (Note: Due to the COVID-19 pandemic in Europe, the match was played behind closed doors.); Referee: Duje Strukan (Croatia)

29 October 2020 2	Lille (France)	2–2	(Scotland) Celtic	Villeneuve-d'Ascq, France
18:55 CET (UTC+1)	André (yellow card) 41'; Çelik 67'; Ikoné 75'	Report	Ntcham (yellow card) 22'; Elyounoussi 28', 33', (yellow card) 84'; Bain (yellow card) 52'; Ajeti (yellow card) 64'; Laxalt (yellow card) 73'	Stadium: Stade Pierre-Mauroy; Attendance: 0 Referee: Aleksandar Stavrev (North Macedonia)

5 November 2020 3	Milan (Italy)	0–3	(France) Lille	Milan, Italy
21:00 CET (UTC+1)	Romagnoli (yellow card) 84'	Report	Yazıcı 22' (pen.), 55', 58'; Xeka (yellow card) 36'; Çelik (yellow card) 75'	Stadium: San Siro; Attendance: 0 Referee: Bartosz Frankowski (Poland)

26 November 2020 4	Lille (France)	1–1	(Italy) Milan	Villeneuve-d'Ascq, France
18:55 CET (UTC+1)	Pied (yellow card) 12'; Xeka (yellow card) 28'; Bamba 65'; Soumaré (yellow card) 67'	Report	Bennacer (yellow card) 45+1'; Castillejo 46'; Brahim (yellow card) 90+1'	Stadium: Stade Pierre-Mauroy; Attendance: 0 Referee: Craig Pawson (England)

3 December 2020 5	Lille (France)	2–1	(Czech Republic) Sparta Prague	Villeneuve-d'Ascq, France
18:55 CET (UTC+1)	Bradarić (yellow card) 50'; André (yellow card) 57'; Yılmaz 80', 84'; Botman (yellow card) 89'	Report	Dočkal (yellow card) 51'; Krejčí II (yellow card) 55'; Čelůstka (yellow card) 62' (yellow-red card) 65'; Krejčí 71', (yellow card) 86'	Stadium: Stade Pierre-Mauroy; Attendance: 0 Referee: Xavier Estrada Fernández (Spain)

10 December 2020 6	Celtic (Scotland)	3–2	(France) Lille	Glasgow, Scotland
21:00 CET (UTC+1)	Jullien 22'; McGregor 28' (pen.); Klimala (yellow card) 58'; Duffy (yellow card) 70'; Turnbull 75'; Soro (yellow card) 90+2'	Report	Ikoné (yellow card) 2', (goal) 24'; Xeka (yellow card) 58'; Weah 71'; David (yellow card) 84'	Stadium: Celtic Park; Attendance: 300; Referee: Fábio Veríssimo (Portugal)

==== Knockout phase ====
===== Round of 32 =====
The draw for the round of 32 was held on 14 December 2020.

18 February 2021 First leg	Lille (France)	1–2	(Netherlands) Ajax	Villeneuve-d'Ascq, France
21:00 CET (UTC+1)	Çelik (yellow card) 17'; Yazıcı (yellow card) 40'; Weah 72'; Maignan (yellow card) 88'; Sanches (yellow card) 90+1'	Report	Álvarez (yellow card) 12'; Blind (yellow card) 66'; Rensch (yellow card) 77'; Tadić 87' (pen.); Brobbey 89', (yellow card) 90+5'	Stadium: Stade Pierre-Mauroy; Attendance: 0 Referee: Ivan Kružliak (Slovakia)

25 February 2021 Second leg	Ajax (Netherlands)	2–1 (4–2 agg.)	(France) Lille	Amsterdam, Netherlands
18:55 CET (UTC+1)	Klaassen 15'; Timber (yellow card) 63'; Neres (yellow card) 85', (goal) 88'	Report	Maignan (yellow card) 15'; Djaló (yellow card) 59'; Sanches (yellow card) 66'; Yazıcı 78' (pen.); Fonte (yellow card) 78'	Stadium: Johan Cruyff Arena; Attendance: 0 Referee: Willie Collum (Scotland)

== Statistics ==
=== Appearances and goals ===
No.	Pos	Nat	Player	Total		Ligue 1		Coupe de France		UEFA Europa League	
No.	Pos	Nat	Player	Apps	Goals	Apps	Goals	Apps	Goals	Apps	Goals
Goalkeepers
1	GK	(Greece) GRE	Orestis Karnezis	1	0	0	0	1	0	0	0
16	GK	(France) FRA	Mike Maignan	48	0	38	0	2	0	8	0
30	GK	(France) FRA	Lucas Chevalier	0	0	0	0	0	0	0	0
Defenders
2	DF	(Turkey) TUR	Zeki Çelik	35	4	28+1	3	1+1	0	4	1
3	DF	(Portugal) POR	Tiago Djaló	24	0	8+9	0	3	0	3+1	0
5	DF	(Netherlands) NED	Sven Botman	47	0	37	0	1+1	0	7+1	0
6	DF	(Portugal) POR	José Fonte	43	3	36	3	0+1	0	6	0
26	DF	(France) FRA	Jérémy Pied	12	0	4+2	0	2+1	0	2+1	0
28	DF	(Mozambique) MOZ	Reinildo Mandava	35	0	24+5	0	0	0	2+4	0
29	DF	(Croatia) CRO	Domagoj Bradarić	36	1	14+12	1	3	0	6+1	0
Midfielders
8	MF	(Portugal) POR	Xeka	42	2	11+22	1	3	1	6	0
10	MF	(France) FRA	Jonathan Ikoné	48	7	26+11	4	0+3	0	5+3	3
12	MF	(Turkey) TUR	Yusuf Yazıcı	42	14	10+22	7	2	0	8	7
15	MF	(Mexico) MEX	Eugenio Pizzuto	0	0	0	0	0	0	0	0
18	MF	(Portugal) POR	Renato Sanches	29	1	14+9	1	1+1	0	3+1	0
21	MF	(France) FRA	Benjamin André	43	0	35	0	1+2	0	3+2	0
24	MF	(France) FRA	Boubakary Soumaré	43	0	21+11	0	3	0	4+4	0
	MF	(Guinea) GUI	Aguibou Camara	1	1	0	0	1	1	0	0
Forwards
7	FW	(France) FRA	Jonathan Bamba	48	7	34+4	6	0+2	0	7+1	1
9	FW	(Canada) CAN	Jonathan David	48	13	29+8	13	0+3	0	7+1	0
11	FW	(Brazil) BRA	Luiz Araújo	37	4	17+11	4	3	0	2+4	0
17	FW	(Turkey) TUR	Burak Yılmaz	33	18	23+5	16	1	0	0+4	2
19	FW	(France) FRA	Isaac Lihadji	21	0	1+14	0	2	0	0+4	0
22	FW	(United States) USA	Timothy Weah	37	5	7+21	3	3	0	3+3	2
23	FW	(France) FRA	Fadiga Ouattara	0	0	0	0	0	0	0	0
Players transferred out during the season
25	DF	(France) FRA	Adama Soumaoro	5	0	1+2	0	0	0	1+1	0
27	MF	(Senegal) SEN	Cheikh Niasse	1	0	0	0	0	0	1	0

Source: Competitions

=== Goalscorers ===
Rank	No.	Pos.	Player	Ligue 1	Coupe de France	Europa League	Total
1	17	FW	(Turkey) Burak Yılmaz	16	0	2	18
2	12	MF	(Turkey) Yusuf Yazıcı	7	0	7	14
3	9	FW	(Canada) Jonathan David	13	0	0	13
4	7	FW	(France) Jonathan Bamba	6	0	1	7
4	10	MF	(France) Jonathan Ikoné	4	0	3	7
6	22	FW	(United States) Timothy Weah	3	0	2	5
7	2	DF	(Turkey) Zeki Çelik	3	0	1	4
7	11	FW	(Brazil) Luiz Araújo	4	0	0	4
9	6	DF	(Portugal) José Fonte	3	0	0	3
10	8	MF	(Portugal) Xeka	1	1	0	2
11	18	MF	(Portugal) Renato Sanches	1	0	0	1
11	29	DF	(Croatia) Domagoj Bradarić	1	0	0	1
11	–	MF	(Guinea) Aguibou Camara	0	1	0	1
Own goals				2	2	0	4
Totals				64	4	16	84

Source: FBRef
