= Zeki Çelik =

Turkish footballer (born 1997)

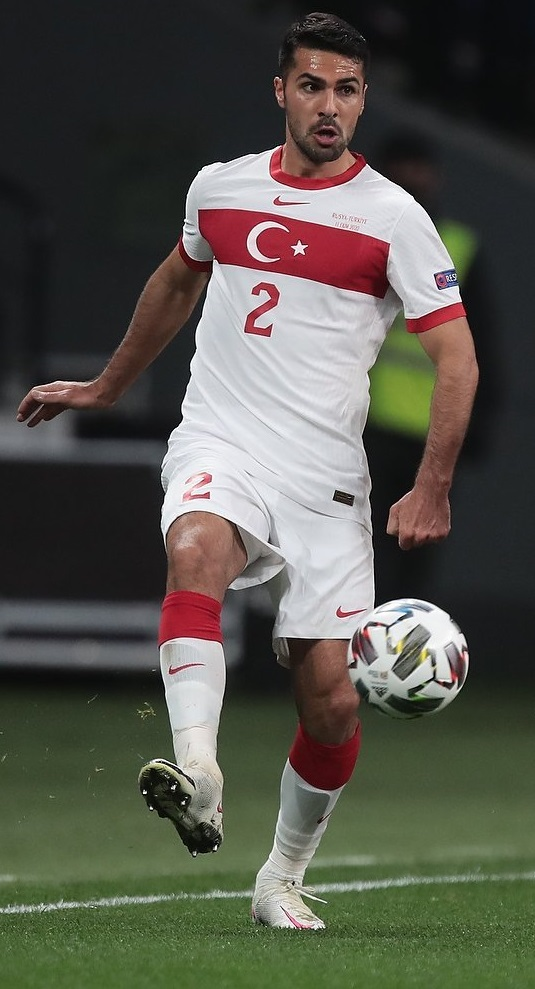
- Çelik playing for Turkey in 2020

Personal information
- Full name: Mehmet Zeki Çelik
- Date of birth: 17 February 1997 (age 29)
- Place of birth: Yıldırım, Turkey
- Height: 1.80 m (5 ft 11 in)
- Positions: Wing-back; full-back; centre-back

Team information
- Current team: Juventus
- Number: 2

Youth career
- 2008–2009: Yavuz Selimspor
- 2009–2015: Bursaspor

Senior career*
Years	Team	Apps	(Gls)
2015–2016	Bursaspor	0	(0)
2015–2016	→ Karacabeyspor (loan)	34	(0)
2016–2018	İstanbulspor	64	(3)
2018–2022	Lille	118	(6)
2022–2026	Roma	106	(1)
2026–	Juventus	9	(0)

International career^{‡}
2012–2013	Turkey U16	11	(0)
2013–2014	Turkey U17	12	(0)
2014	Turkey U18	2	(0)
2017–2018	Turkey U21	9	(0)
2018–	Turkey	68	(3)
- * Club domestic league appearances and goals as of 22 November 2026 ‡ National team caps and goals as of 15 November 2026

Mehmet Zeki Çelik (Turkish pronunciation: [ˈzeci ˈtʃelik]; born 17 February 1997) is a Turkish professional footballer who plays for Serie A club Juventus and the Turkey national team. A versatile defender that can play across both flanks, he can also be deployed as a centre-back in a back three.

== Early life ==
Çelik was born on 17 February 1997 in Yıldırım, Bursa Province. He is of Kurdish descent from Muş

== Club career ==
=== Bursaspor ===
Born in Bursa as the youngest of nine children, Çelik went through the Bursaspor youth academy and became a professional in 2015. He signed on loan with Karacabey Birlikspor in 2015.

=== İstanbulspor ===
In 2016, he joined İstanbulspor. His good performance with İstanbulspor earned him a call-up to the senior Turkey national team in 2018, despite playing in the TFF First League.

=== Lille ===
On 8 July 2018, Çelik signed for Lille in France on a five-year contract. Çelik made his professional debut in a 3–1 Ligue 1 win over Stade Rennes on 11 August 2018.

=== Roma ===
On 5 July 2022, Çelik’s transfer to Roma from Lille was made official by the Serie A club, Roma. He has signed a four-year contract with the Giallorossi that runs until 30 June 2026. He made his Serie A debut in a 1–0 win over Cremonese on 22 August 2022.

=== Juventus ===
On 16 July 2026, Çelik was announced as a new Juventus player. He signed a contract valid until 30 June 2029. Çelik scored the fourth goal in a 5-0 victory against NEC Nijmegen in the club UEFA Europa League opening match on 17 September.

== International career ==
Çelik made his professional debut for the Turkey national team in a 1–1 friendly with Russia on 5 June 2018.

On 2 June 2026, Çelik was selected in the 26-man squad for the 2026 FIFA World Cup.

== Career statistics ==
=== Club ===
As of match played 22 November 2026

Appearances and goals by club, season and competition
Club	Season	League			National cup (Note: Includes Turkish Cup, Coupe de France, Coppa Italia)		League cup (Note: Includes Coupe de la Ligue)		Europe		Other		Total	
Club	Season	Division	Apps	Goals	Apps	Goals	Apps	Goals	Apps	Goals	Apps	Goals	Apps	Goals
Karacabeyspor (loan)	2015–16	TFF Second League	34	0	1	0	—		—		—		35	0
İstanbulspor	2016–17	TFF Second League	31	0	0	0	—		—		—		31	0
İstanbulspor	2017–18	TFF First League	33	3	5	0	—		—		—		38	3
İstanbulspor	Total		64	3	5	0	—		—		—		69	3
Lille	2018–19	Ligue 1	34	1	2	0	0	0	—		—		36	1
Lille	2019–20	Ligue 1	23	0	1	0	2	0	6 (Note: Appearances in UEFA Champions League)	0	—		32	0
Lille	2020–21	Ligue 1	29	3	2	0	—		4 (Note: Appearances in UEFA Europa League)	1	—		35	4
Lille	2021–22	Ligue 1	32	2	1	1	—		7	0	0	0	40	3
Lille	Total		118	6	6	1	2	0	17	1	0	0	143	8
Roma	2022–23	Serie A	24	0	2	0	—		8	0	—		34	0
Roma	2023–24	Serie A	17	0	1	0	—		11	0	—		29	0
Roma	2024–25	Serie A	31	0	2	0	—		10	1	—		43	1
Roma	2025–26	Serie A	34	1	1	0	—		10	0	—		45	1
Roma	Total		106	1	6	0	—		39	1	—		151	2
Juventus	2026–27	Serie A	9	0	0	0	—		2	2	—		11	2
Career total			331	10	18	1	2	0	58	4	0	0	409	15

=== International ===
As of match played 15 November 2026

Appearances and goals by national team and year
National team	Year	Apps	Goals
Turkey	2018	4	0
Turkey	2019	10	2
Turkey	2020	4	0
Turkey	2021	11	0
Turkey	2022	6	0
Turkey	2023	7	0
Turkey	2024	11	0
Turkey	2025	5	1
Turkey	2026	10	0
Total		68	3

Scores and results list Turkey's goal tally first.

List of international goals scored by Zeki Çelik
No.	Date	Venue	Opponent	Score	Result	Competition
1.	2 June 2019	Bahçeşehir Okulları Stadium, Alanya, Turkey	Uzbekistan	1–0	2–0	Friendly
2.	2 June 2019	Bahçeşehir Okulları Stadium, Alanya, Turkey	Uzbekistan	2–0	2–0	Friendly
3.	11 October 2025	Vasil Levski National Stadium, Sofia, Bulgaria	Bulgaria	5–1	6–1	2026 FIFA World Cup qualification

== Honours ==
Istanbulspor

- TFF Second League: 2016–17

Lille

- Ligue 1: 2020–21

Roma

- UEFA Europa League runner-up: 2022–23
