= Adama Soumaoro =

French footballer (born 1992)

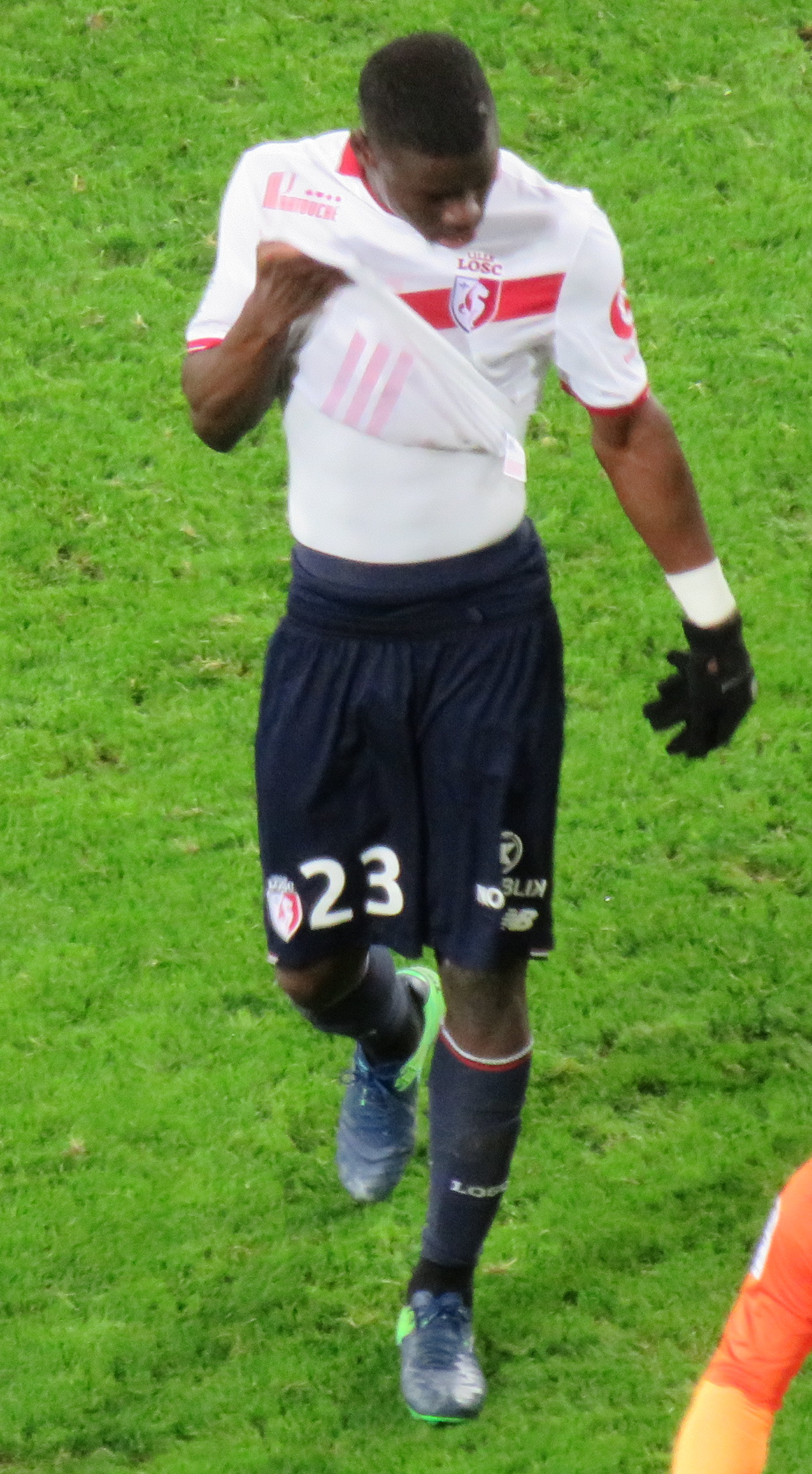
- Soumaoro with Lille in 2016

Personal information
- Full name: Bakary Adama Soumaoro
- Date of birth: 18 June 1992 (age 34)
- Place of birth: Fontenay-aux-Roses, France
- Height: 1.86 m (6 ft 1 in)
- Position: Centre-back

Youth career
- Lille

Senior career*
Years	Team	Apps	(Gls)
2011–2019	Lille B	73	(2)
2011–2021	Lille	103	(2)
2020	→ Genoa (loan)	8	(1)
2021	→ Bologna (loan)	20	(1)
2021–2024	Bologna	51	(0)
- * Club domestic league appearances and goals as of 09:38, 21 June 2023 (UTC)

Bakary Adama Soumaoro (born 18 June 1992) is a French professional footballer who last played as a centre-back for Serie A club Bologna.

== Career ==
On 31 January 2020, Soumaoro joined Serie A club Genoa on loan with an option-to-buy. On 10 January 2021, he moved on another Italian loan, this time to Bologna. However, in contrary to his loan at Genoa, his loan at Bologna was made permanent. The reported fee was of €2.5 million.

== Personal life ==
Soumaoro was born in Fontenay-aux-Roses, in the southern suburbs of Paris. He has French nationality and is of Malian descent.

== Career statistics ==
As of match played 4 May 2023

Appearances and goals by club, season and competition
Club	Season	League			Cup		Continental		Total	
Club	Season	Division	Apps	Goals	Apps	Goals	Apps	Goals	Apps	Goals
Lille	2013–14	Ligue 1	4	0	3	0	—		7	0
Lille	2014–15	Ligue 1	1	0	0	0	0	0	1	0
Lille	2015–16	Ligue 1	28	0	3	1	—		31	1
Lille	2016–17	Ligue 1	27	0	5	1	1	0	33	1
Lille	2017–18	Ligue 1	14	0	1	0	—		15	0
Lille	2018–19	Ligue 1	20	0	2	0	—		22	0
Lille	2019–20	Ligue 1	6	1	3	0	1	0	10	1
Lille	2020–21	Ligue 1	3	0	0	0	2	0	5	0
Lille	Total		103	1	17	2	4	0	124	3
Genoa (loan)	2019–20	Serie A	8	1	0	0	—		8	1
Bologna (loan)	2020–21	Serie A	20	1	0	0	—		20	1
Bologna	2021–22	Serie A	28	0	1	0	—		29	0
Bologna	2022–23	Serie A	23	0	3	0	—		26	0
Bologna	2023–24	Serie A	0	0	0	0	—		0	0
Bologna	Total		71	1	4	0	—		75	1
Career total			182	3	21	2	4	0	207	5

== Honours ==
Lille

- Ligue 1: 2020–21
