= Sven Botman =

Dutch footballer (born 2000)

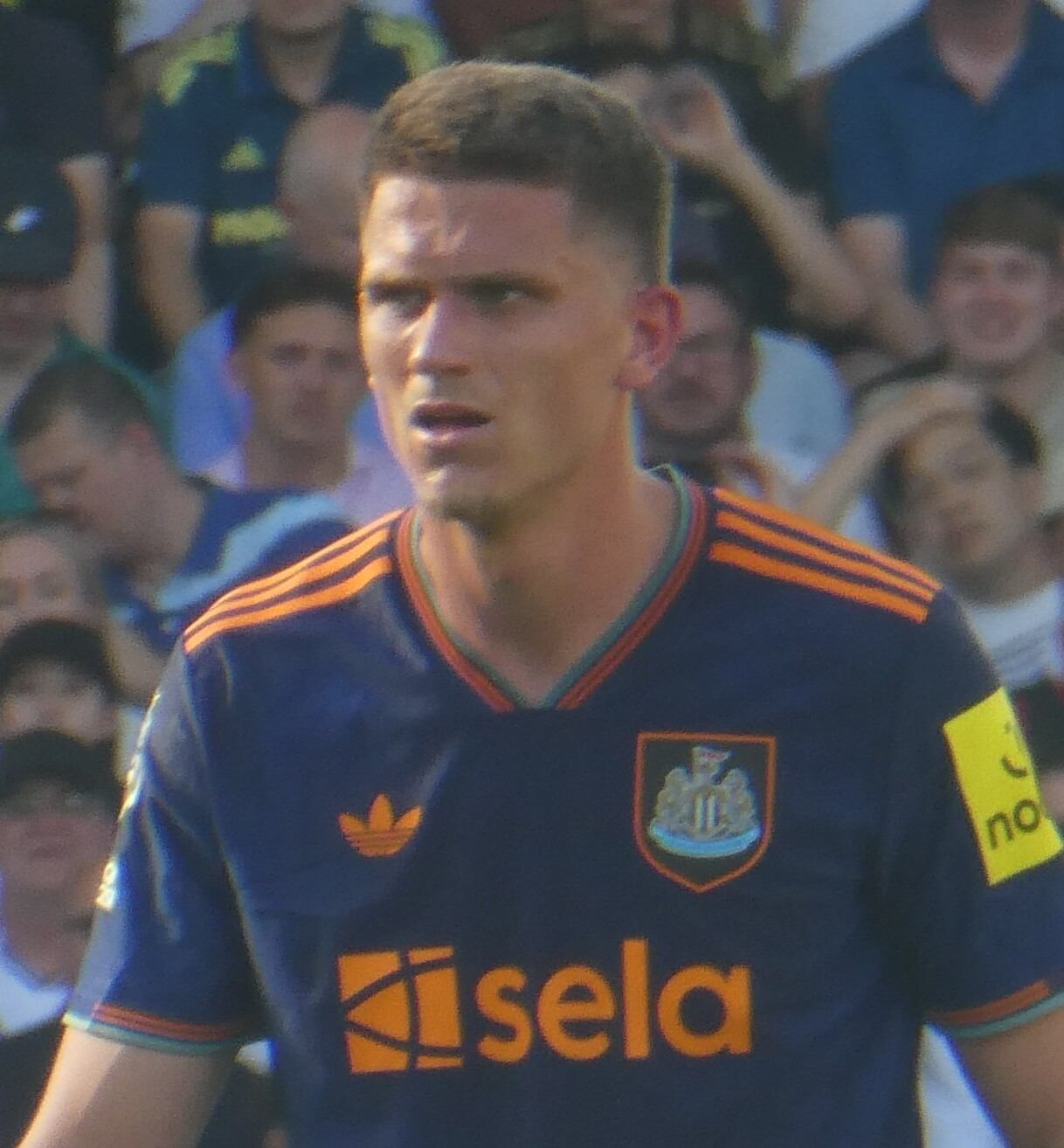
- Botman playing for Newcastle United in 2026

Personal information
- Full name: Sven Adriaan Botman
- Date of birth: 12 January 2000 (age 26)
- Place of birth: Badhoevedorp, Netherlands
- Height: 1.93 m (6 ft 4 in)
- Position: Centre-back

Team information
- Current team: Newcastle United
- Number: 4

Youth career
- –2009: RKSV Pancratius
- 2009–2020: Ajax

Senior career*
Years	Team	Apps	(Gls)
2018–2020	Jong Ajax	28	(2)
2019–2020	→ Heerenveen (loan)	26	(2)
2020–2022	Lille	62	(3)
2022–	Newcastle United	92	(4)

International career
2015	Netherlands U15	5	(0)
2015–2016	Netherlands U16	5	(0)
2017	Netherlands U18	3	(0)
2018–2019	Netherlands U19	10	(0)
2019	Netherlands U20	2	(0)
2020–2022	Netherlands U21	12	(2)
- * Club domestic league appearances and goals as of 23:29, 12 October 2026 (UTC)

Sven Adriaan Botman (born 12 January 2000) is a Dutch professional footballer who plays primarily as a centre-back for Premier League club Newcastle United. He has represented the Netherlands at youth levels under-15 through under-21.

== Club career ==
=== Ajax ===
On 23 June 2018, Botman made his debut for the senior team of Ajax in a friendly against VVSB. He made his Eerste Divisie debut for Jong Ajax on 17 August 2018 in a game against Roda JC.

=== Lille ===
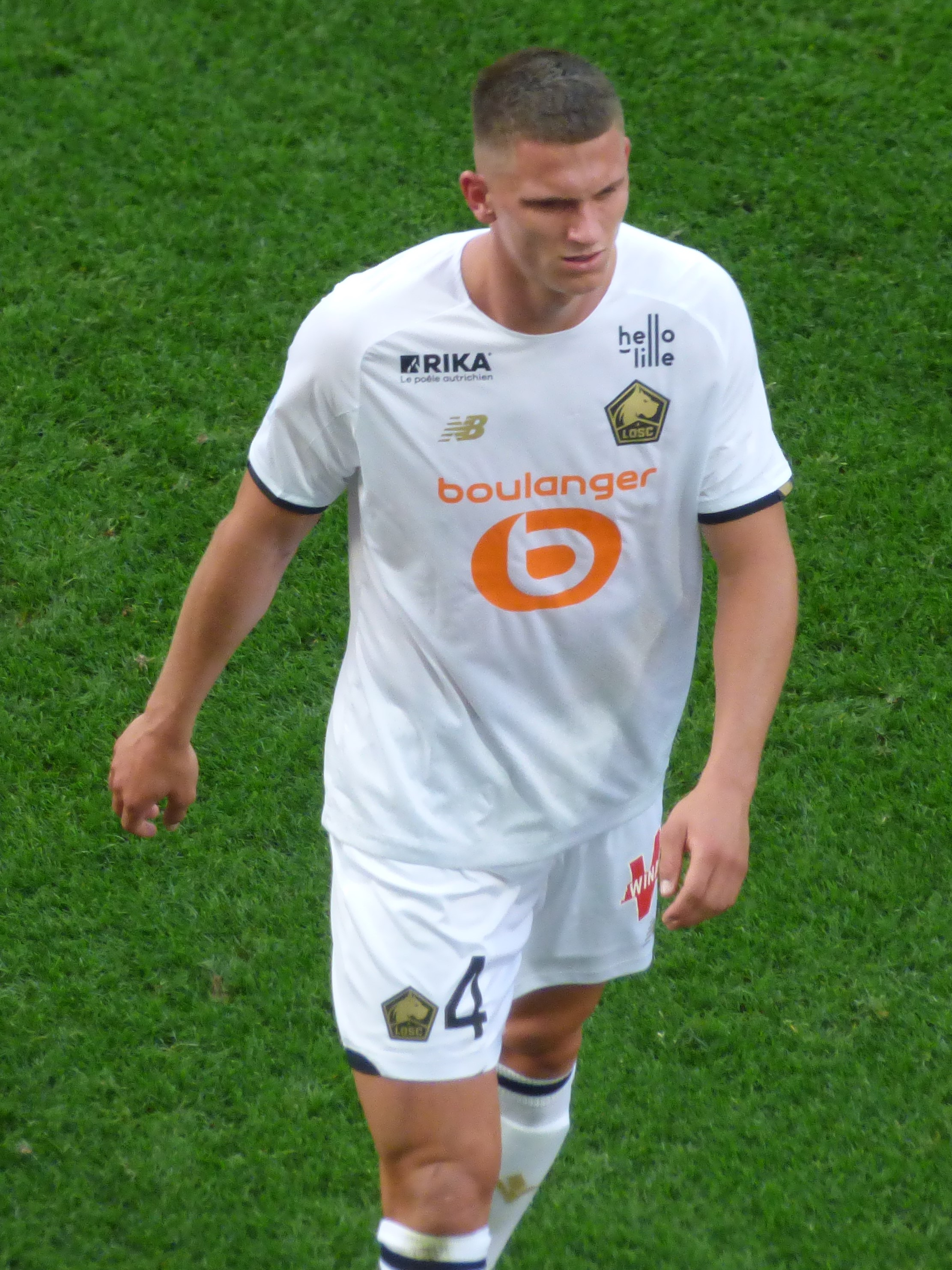
Botman with Lille in 2021

On 15 May 2020, he signed a deal with Ajax, which would keep him at the club until 30 June 2023. However, a few months later, on 31 July 2020, he signed a five-year deal with the French club Lille, who bought him from Ajax for almost 7 million euros. He made a good start, and was a starter for the entire 2020–21 season. Lille surprisingly won the Ligue 1 and, for the first time in the club's history, also the Trophée des Champions. This Super Cup was won in a 1–0 victory over Coupe de France winner Paris Saint-Germain.

=== Newcastle United ===
On 28 June 2022, Botman signed for Premier League club Newcastle United on a five-year deal for €40 million. On 24 September 2023, Botman scored his first goal for Newcastle in a record 8–0 away win over Sheffield United. In March 2024, he sustained an anterior cruciate ligament injury during an FA Cup match against Manchester City, which would sideline him for six to nine months. On 16 December, Botman made his return from his ACL injury in a Professional Development League Premier League 2 game vs the Chelsea Development Squad.

On 12 January 2026, Botman extended his contract with Newcastle United until the summer of 2030.

== International career ==
He has captained the Netherlands at under-21 level, as well as being called up to the senior Netherlands squad for the first time in November 2020. In October 2022, Botman was included in the preliminary squad for the 2022 FIFA World Cup.

== Personal life ==
Botman's girlfriend Chana Kesselaar is a fashion stylist from Amsterdam. The pair have been in a long-term relationship since 2016. They welcomed a daughter, Giulia, in September 2024.

== Career statistics ==
As of match played 12 October 2026

Appearances and goals by club, season and competition
Club	Season	League			National cup (Note: Includes KNVB Cup, Coupe de France, FA Cup)		League cup (Note: Includes EFL Cup)		Europe		Other		Total	
Club	Season	Division	Apps	Goals	Apps	Goals	Apps	Goals	Apps	Goals	Apps	Goals	Apps	Goals
Jong Ajax	2018–19	Eerste Divisie	28	2	—		—		—		—		28	2
Heerenveen (loan)	2019–20	Eredivisie	26	2	4	0	—		—		—		30	2
Lille	2020–21	Ligue 1	37	0	2	0	—		8 (Note: Appearances in UEFA Europa League)	0	—		47	0
Lille	2021–22	Ligue 1	25	3	1	0	—		5 (Note: Appearance(s) in UEFA Champions League)	0	1 (Note: Appearance in Trophée des Champions)	0	32	3
Lille	Total		62	3	3	0	—		13	0	1	0	79	3
Newcastle United	2022–23	Premier League	36	0	1	0	7	0	—		—		44	0
Newcastle United	2023–24	Premier League	17	2	3	0	1	0	1	0	—		22	2
Newcastle United	2024–25	Premier League	8	0	0	0	2	0	—		—		10	0
Newcastle United	2025–26	Premier League	25	1	2	0	3	0	8	1	—		38	2
Newcastle United	2026–27	Premier League	6	1	0	0	2	0	—		—		8	1
Newcastle United	Total		92	4	6	0	15	0	9	1	—		122	5
Career total			208	11	13	0	15	0	22	1	1	0	259	12

== Honours ==
Lille

- Ligue 1: 2020–21
- Trophée des Champions: 2021

Newcastle United

- EFL Cup: 2024–25; runner-up: 2022–23
