= Luiz Araújo (footballer) =

Brazilian footballer (born 1996)

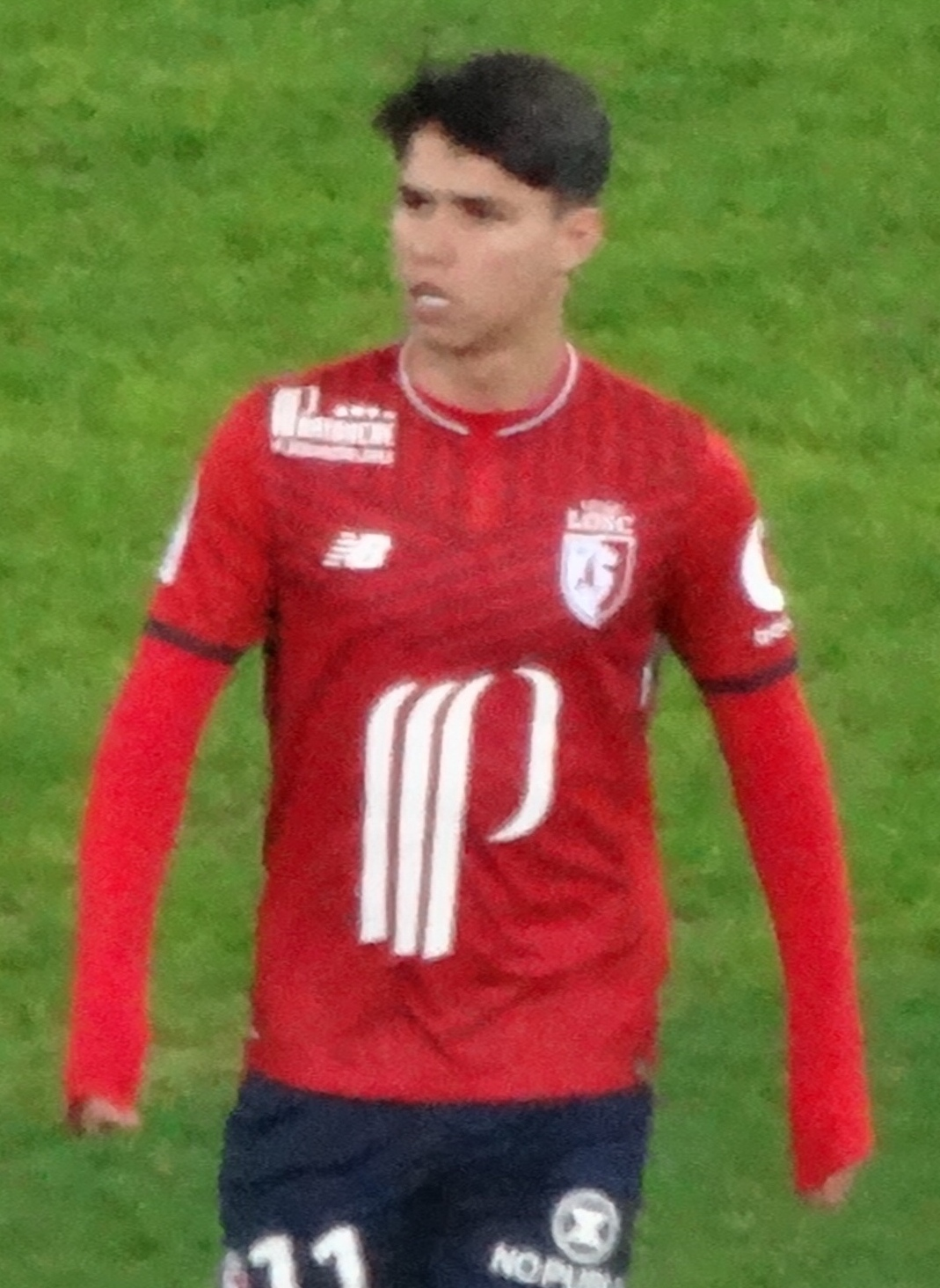
- Luiz Araújo with Lille in 2018

Personal information
- Full name: Luiz de Araújo Guimarães Neto
- Date of birth: 2 June 1996 (age 30)
- Place of birth: Taquaritinga, Brazil
- Height: 1.75 m (5 ft 9 in)
- Position: Winger

Team information
- Current team: Flamengo
- Number: 7

Youth career
- 2012–2013: Mirassol
- 2013–2016: São Paulo

Senior career*
Years	Team	Apps	(Gls)
2013	Mirassol	0	(0)
2016–2017	São Paulo	41	(7)
2016	→ Novorizontino (loan)	5	(0)
2017–2021	Lille	108	(14)
2021–2023	Atlanta United	59	(11)
2023–	Flamengo	113	(20)

International career^{‡}
2012	Brazil U17	0	(0)
- * Club domestic league appearances and goals as of 7 April 2026 ‡ National team caps and goals as of 14 October 2013 (UTC)

Luiz de Araújo Guimarães Neto (born 2 June 1996), known as Luiz Araújo (Brazilian Portuguese: [luˈiz ɐɾɐˈuʒu]), is a Brazilian professional footballer who plays as a winger for Campeonato Brasileiro Série A club Flamengo.

== Club career ==
=== São Paulo ===
Born in Taquaritinga, São Paulo, Araújo began his career with Mirassol as a youth, before being promoted to the first team in January 2013. Before he could make his debut for Mirassol, Araújo joined São Paulo, returning to youth football.

==== Loan to Novorizontino ====
On 26 February 2016, after finishing as the top scorer in the U-20 Copa Libertadores, Araújo was loaned to Novorizontino until the end of the Campeonato Paulista in April. He made his professional debut for the club on 19 March, coming on as a second-half substitute in a 1–1 home draw against XV de Piracicaba.

==== Return to São Paulo ====
Following the Campeonato Paulista season, Araújo returned to São Paulo and immediately joined the first team. He made his senior and Série A debut for the club on 5 June 2016 against Cruzeiro, replacing Ytalo in a 1–0 victory. He then made his debut in the Copa Libertadores on 13 July 2016 against Atlético Nacional in the second leg of the semifinals, coming on as a substitute in the 2–1 defeat. On 5 November, Araújo scored his first professional goal, a late second half stoppage time strike to help São Paulo win 4–0 over Corinthians.

Araújo finished his debut season with São Paulo on 11 December against Santa Cruz, scoring the fifth goal in a 5–0 home victory.

On 15 February 2017, Araújo scored his first two goals of the season, earning a brace in a 3–1 away victory against Santos in the Campeonato Paulista. He played his final match for São Paulo on 4 June 2017, a 1–0 defeat against Ponte Preta.

=== Lille ===
On 14 June 2017, Araújo signed for French Ligue 1 club Lille, for a reported €10.5 million. He made his debut for the club in their opening match on 6 August against Nantes, starting for Marcelo Bielsa's side in a 3–0 victory. Araújo then scored his first goal for Lille on 14 October in a 2–2 home draw against Troyes. His goal was a 12th-minute equalizer. Araújo completed his first season at Lille with 6 goals in 36 matches as the club barely managed to survive relegation from the first division.

During the 2018–19 season, Araújo dropped to just six starts in the league but played in 27 matches overall in Ligue 1, contributing three goals, as Lille finished 2nd behind Paris Saint-Germain.

The next season, 2019–20, Araújo continued as a regular substitute for Lille but played more matches overall. He scored his first goal of the campaign on 13 September 2019 against Angers in a 2–1 home victory. Araújo then made his European debut for Lille in the UEFA Champions League on 17 September against Ajax. He came on as a 63rd-minute substitute in the 3–0 defeat. Araújo would go on to play in all six matches, earning three starts, for Lille as they were knocked out after the group stage, finishing last.

Following the 2019–20 season, which was cancelled due to the COVID-19 pandemic, Araújo began the 2020–21 season as an 83rd-minute substitute against Rennais in a 1–1 draw. He then scored two goals in two matches on 13 September and 20 September against Metz and Marseille. His goal against Metz was the only goal in the 1–0 victory and the opening goal in the 1–1 draw against Marseille. Araújo made his debut for Lille in their opening match of the UEFA Europa League group stage on 22 October 2020 in a 4–1 away victory against Sparta Prague. Lille would go on to finish 2nd in their group and qualify for the knock-outs. On 3 December, he suffered an injury during the club's home match against Sparta Prague, leaving Araújo out until 2021.

Araújo returned to the pitch for Lille on 17 January 2021 against Reims. On 16 April, Araújo scored the equalizer for Lille in a 1–1 draw against Montpellier. The draw helped keep Lille six points ahead of Paris Saint-Germain for the league title. The title was soon secured during the final match on 23 May against Angers, with Lille winning by just a point over Paris Saint-Germain. Araújo came on as an 82nd-minute substitute during the 2–1 away victory.

On 1 August 2021, Araújo played his final match for Lille, in the Trophée des Champions against Paris Saint-Germain. He started and played 85 minutes as Lille secured a 1–0 victory at Bloomfield Stadium in Tel Aviv.

=== Atlanta United ===
On 6 August 2021, Araújo signed with Major League Soccer side Atlanta United as a designated player. He made his debut for the club on 18 August against Toronto FC, playing 67 minutes in a 1–0 victory at Mercedes-Benz Stadium.

Araújo scored his first goal for the club on 15 September, converting after getting the ball 50 yards from goal, spinning past his defender, running and curling his shot into the left corner in the 5th minute, as Atlanta United won 4–0 at home.

=== Flamengo ===
On 18 May 2023, it was announced that Araújo would join Brazilian side Flamengo on a permanent deal at the end of June, the Brazilian club agreed to pay a €9m transfer fee.

== International career ==
On 3 September 2012, aged 16 and having never earned any cap for the full side, Luiz Araújo was selected by Brazil U17 for the 2013 FIFA U-17 World Cup by manager Alexandre Gallo, as one of the three overage players. On 6 July 2013, however, he left the squad due to an elbow injury and was replaced by Gabigol.

== Style of play ==
Luiz Araújo was known for his ability to score free kick goals, also working closely with São Paulo employees to study his adversaries. In March 2015, coach Dorival Júnior said he would be the perfect choice to lecture younger players in the position who made the national team.

== Career statistics ==
As of match played 24 August 2026

Appearances and goals by club, season and competition
Club	Season	League			National Cup		State League		Continental		Other		Total	
Club	Season	Division	Apps	Goals	Apps	Goals	Apps	Goals	Apps	Goals	Apps	Goals	Apps	Goals
Mirassol	2013	—			0	0	0	0	—		—		0	0
São Paulo	2016	Série A	22	2	2	0	—		1 (Note: Appearance in Copa Libertadores)	0	—		25	2
São Paulo	2017	Série A	4	2	4	2	15	3	1 (Note: Appearance in Copa Sudamericana)	0	—		24	7
São Paulo	Total		26	4	6	2	15	3	2	0	—		49	9
Novorizontino (loan)	2016	—			0	0	5	0	—		—		5	0
Lille	2017–18	Ligue 1	34	5	2	1	—		—		—		36	6
Lille	2018–19	Ligue 1	25	3	4	1	—		—		—		29	4
Lille	2019–20	Ligue 1	21	2	6	2	—		6 (Note: Appearances in UEFA Champions League)	0	—		33	4
Lille	2020–21	Ligue 1	28	4	3	0	—		6 (Note: Appearances in UEFA Europa League)	0	—		37	4
Lille	2021–22	Ligue 1	—		—		—		0	0	1 (Note: Appearance in Trophée des Champions)	0	1	0
Lille	Total		108	14	15	4	—		12	0	1	0	136	18
Atlanta United	2021	MLS	16	4	—		—		0	0	—		16	4
Atlanta United	2022	MLS	28	4	2	2	—		—		—		30	6
Atlanta United	2023	MLS	16	3	1	0	—		—		—		17	3
Atlanta United	Total		60	11	3	2	—		0	0	0	0	63	13
Flamengo	2023	Série A	20	3	5	0	—		1	0	—		26	3
Flamengo	2024	Série A	20	3	4	1	13	1	8	1	—		45	6
Flamengo	2025	Série A	35	7	2	0	10	3	12	1	8	2	67	13
Flamengo	2026	Série A	13	2	2	0	6	1	6	1	1	0	28	4
Flamengo	Total		88	15	13	1	29	5	27	3	9	2	166	26
Career total			288	45	37	9	49	7	41	3	10	2	420	66

== Honours ==
=== Club ===
Lille

- Ligue 1: 2020–21
- Trophée des Champions: 2021

Flamengo

- FIFA Challenger Cup: 2025
- FIFA Derby of the Americas: 2025
- Copa Libertadores: 2025
- Campeonato Brasileiro Série A: 2025
- Copa do Brasil: 2024
- Supercopa do Brasil: 2025
- Campeonato Carioca: 2024, 2025
