= 2018–19 Lille OSC season =

Lille
2018–19 season
- President: Gérard Lopez
- Head coach: Christophe Galtier
- Stadium: Stade Pierre-Mauroy
- Ligue 1: 2nd
- Coupe de France: Round of 16
- Coupe de la Ligue: Third round
- Top goalscorer: League: Nicolas Pépé (22); All: Nicolas Pépé (23)
- Highest home attendance: 49,712 v. Paris Saint-Germain (14 April 2019)
- Lowest home attendance: League: 25,708 v. Rennes (11 August 2018); All: 12,374 v. Sochaux (7 January 2019, CdF Ro64)
- Average home league attendance: 34,084
- Biggest win: 5–0 v. Angers (18 May 2019)
- Biggest defeat: –2 goals (thrice); 0–2 at Strasbourg, 30 October, CdlL R3; 0–2 at Nice, 25 November; 1–3 at Rennes, 24 May
Home colours	Away colours	Third colours

The 2018–19 season was Lille OSC's 75th season in existence and the club's 19th consecutive season in the top flight of French football.

== Players ==
=== Squad information ===
As of 31 January 2019.

Note: Flags indicate national team as defined under FIFA eligibility rules; some limited exceptions apply. Players may hold more than one non-FIFA nationality.

No.	Pos.	Nation	Player
1	GK	SVK	Adam Jakubech
3	DF	MLI	Youssouf Koné
4	DF	BRA	Gabriel
5	DF	FRA	Adama Soumaoro (Captain)
6	DF	POR	José Fonte (Vice-captain)
7	FW	POR	Rafael Leão
8	MF	POR	Xeka
9	FW	FRA	Loïc Rémy
10	FW	POR	Rui Fonte (on loan from Fulham)
11	FW	BRA	Luiz Araújo
12	MF	FRA	Jonathan Ikoné
14	FW	FRA	Jonathan Bamba

No.	Pos.	Nation	Player
16	GK	FRA	Mike Maignan
17	DF	TUR	Zeki Çelik
19	FW	CIV	Nicolas Pépé
20	MF	BRA	Thiago Maia
21	MF	SRB	Arton Zekaj
22	DF	CIV	Yves Dabila
23	MF	BRA	Thiago Mendes
24	MF	FRA	Boubakary Soumaré
26	DF	FRA	Jérémy Pied
28	DF	MOZ	Reinildo Mandava (on loan from Belenenses)
30	GK	BFA	Hervé Koffi
33	DF	TOG	Hakim Ouro-Sama

=== Out on loan ===
Note: Flags indicate national team as defined under FIFA eligibility rules; some limited exceptions apply. Players may hold more than one non-FIFA nationality.

No.	Pos.	Nation	Player
--	DF	PAR	Júnior Alonso (on loan at Boca Juniors)
--	DF	POR	Edgar Ié (on loan at FC Nantes)
--	MF	MLI	Rominigue Kouamé (on loan at Paris FC)

No.	Pos.	Nation	Player
--	FW	ALG	Yassine Benzia (on loan at Fenerbahçe)
--	FW	NED	Anwar El Ghazi (on loan at Aston Villa)
--	MF	ALB	Agim Zeka (on loan at Fortuna Sittard)

=== Reserve team ===
As of 16 January 2019.

Note: Flags indicate national team as defined under FIFA eligibility rules; some limited exceptions apply. Players may hold more than one non-FIFA nationality.

No.	Pos.	Nation	Player
--	GK	FRA	Lucas Chevalier
--	GK	FRA	Anthony Herbin
--	GK	FRA	Yann Lemeur
--	DF	BRA	Fernando Costanza
--	DF	FRA	Ruben Droehnlé
--	DF	FRA	Scotty Sadzoute
--	DF	FRA	Benjamin Vérité
--	DF	FRA	Maxime Wackers
--	MF	FRA	Farès Bahlouli
--	MF	FRA	Chahreddine Boukholda
--	MF	FRA	Jonathan Bumbu
--	MF	TUR	Ferhat Cogalan
--	MF	FRA	Kader Keita

No.	Pos.	Nation	Player
--	MF	FRA	Jaly Mouaddib
--	MF	SEN	Cheikh Niasse
--	MF	FRA	Darly Nlandu
--	MF	FRA	Teddy Okou
--	MF	FRA	Maxime Pau
--	FW	LUX	Yan Bouché
--	FW	FRA	Charles Brym
--	FW	GUI	Aboubacar Condé
--	FW	FRA	Corentin Fatou
--	FW	FRA	Alexis Flips
--	FW	LTU	Nauris Petkevicius
--	FW	BFA	Abou Ouattara (on loan from Mechelen)
--	FW	FRA	Imad Faraj

== Competitions ==
=== Ligue 1 ===
==== League table ====
Pos	Team	Pld	W	D	L	GF	GA	GD	Pts	Qualification or relegation
1	Paris Saint-Germain (C)	38	29	4	5	105	35	+70	91	Qualification to Champions League group stage
2	Lille	38	22	9	7	68	33	+35	75	Qualification to Champions League group stage
3	Lyon	38	21	9	8	70	47	+23	72	Qualification to Champions League group stage
4	Saint-Étienne	38	19	9	10	59	41	+18	66	Qualification to Europa League group stage
5	Marseille	38	18	7	13	60	52	+8	61	

Source: Ligue 1 and Soccerway
Rules for classification: 1) Points; 2) Goal difference; 3) Head-to-head points; 4) Head-to-head goal difference; 5) Head-to-head goals scored; 6) Head-to-head away goals scored; 7) Goals scored; 8) Away goals scored; 9) Most goals scored in single league match; 10) Fairplay ranking.
(C) Champions

==== Results summary ====
Overall								Home						Away					
Pld	W	D	L	GF	GA	GD	Pts	W	D	L	GF	GA	GD	W	D	L	GF	GA	GD
38	22	9	7	68	33	+35	75	13	4	2	42	11	+31	9	5	5	26	22	+4

Source: Competitive matches

==== Results by round ====
Round	1	2	3	4	5	6	7	8	9	10	11	12	13	14	15	16	17	18	19	20	21	22	23	24	25	26	27	28	29	30	31	32	33	34	35	36	37	38
Ground	H	A	H	A	A	H	A	H	H	A	H	A	H	A	H	A	H	A	H	A	H	A	H	A	H	A	H	A	H	A	A	H	A	H	A	H	H	A
Result	W	D	W	L	W	W	L	W	W	W	W	L	D	L	D	W	D	W	L	W	W	W	W	W	D	D	W	W	L	W	D	W	D	W	D	W	W	L
Position	4	7	3	4	3	2	4	2	2	2	2	3	2	4	4	2	2	2	2	2	2	2	2	2	2	2	2	2	2	2	2	2	2	2	2	2	2	2

Source: Ligue 1
A = Away; H = Home; W = Win; D = Draw; L = Loss

==== Matches ====
11 August 2018 1	Lille	3–1	Rennes	Villeneuve-d'Ascq
20:00 CEST (UTC+2)	Mothiba 45'; Pépé 54'; Bamba 68'; Dabila (yellow card) 88'	Report	Grenier 43'	Stadium: Stade Pierre-Mauroy; Attendance: 25,708; Referee: Willy Delajod

18 August 2018 2	Monaco	0–0	Lille	Monaco
20:00 CEST (UTC+2)	Mboula (yellow card) 37'	Report	Xeka (yellow card) 15'; Mendes (yellow card) 64'; Çelik (yellow card) 67'	Stadium: Stade Louis II; Attendance: 11,140; Referee: Thomas Léonard

26 August 2018 3	Lille	3–0	Guingamp	Villeneuve-d'Ascq
15:00 CEST (UTC+2)	Xeka 7'; Bamba 10', 73'; Soumaoro (yellow card) 63'; J. Fonte (yellow card) 84'	Report	Traoré (yellow card) 49'; Kerbrat (red card) 81'	Stadium: Stade Pierre-Mauroy; Attendance: 27,230; Referee: Johan Hamel

1 September 2018 4	Angers	1–0	Lille	Angers
20:00 CEST (UTC+2)	Traoré 60'; Mangani (red card) 64'	Report	Çelik (yellow card) 56'	Stadium: Stade Raymond Kopa; Attendance: 9,245; Referee: Eric Wattellier

15 September 2018 5	Amiens	2–3	Lille	Amiens
20:00 CEST (UTC+2)	Dibassy (yellow card) 54'; Kurzawa 79'; Ghoddos 90+3'	Report	Pépé 45+2' (pen.), 56' (pen.), 76'; Ikoné (yellow card) 49'; J. Fonte (yellow card) 85'	Stadium: Stade de la Licorne; Attendance: 11,569; Referee: Nicolas Rainville

22 September 2018 6	Lille	2–1	Nantes	Villeneuve-d'Ascq
17:00 CEST (UTC+2)	J. Fonte 9'; Mendes (yellow card) 17'; Ballo-Touré (yellow card) 49'; Xeka (yellow card) 63'; Ikoné 68'	Report	Diego (yellow card) 27'; Krhin (yellow card) 33'; Miazga (yellow card) 50'; Coulibaly 82', (yellow card) 90+5'	Stadium: Stade Pierre-Mauroy; Attendance: 27,353; Referee: Benoît Bastien

26 September 2018 7	Bordeaux	1–0	Lille	Bordeaux
19:00 CEST (UTC+2)	Kamano 7'; Kalu (yellow card) 61'	Report	Soumaoro (yellow card) 55' (yellow-red card) 89'; Mendes (yellow card) 84'	Stadium: Matmut Atlantique; Attendance: 17,395; Referee: Karim Abed

30 September 2018 8	Lille	3–0	Marseille	Villeneuve-d'Ascq
21:00 CEST (UTC+2)	Xeka (yellow card) 18'; Pépé 65' (pen.); Bamba 86' (pen.), 89'	Report	Ocampos (yellow card) 17'; Mandanda (yellow card) 63'; Luiz Gustavo (yellow card) 85'	Stadium: Stade Pierre-Mauroy; Attendance: 41,623; Referee: Mikael Lesage

6 October 2018 9	Lille	3–1	Saint-Étienne	Villeneuve-d'Ascq
17:00 CEST (UTC+2)	Bamba 17', 46'; Xeka (yellow card) 26'; Ballo-Touré (yellow card) 76'; Pépé 85'	Report	Cabella 26' (pen.); Selnæs (yellow card) 74'	Stadium: Stade Pierre-Mauroy; Attendance: 31,263; Referee: Jérôme Miguelgorry

20 October 2018 10	Dijon	1–2	Lille	Dijon
20:00 CEST (UTC+2)	Loiodice (yellow card) 31'; Abeid 81' (pen.); Haddadi (yellow card) 90+2'	Report	Pépé 21' (pen.); Luiz Araújo 43'; Soumaré (yellow card) 79'; Maignan (yellow card) 81'	Stadium: Stade Gaston Gérard; Attendance: 13,004; Referee: Thomas Léonard

27 October 2018 11	Lille	1–0	Caen	Villeneuve-d'Ascq
20:00 CEST (UTC+2)	Leão 56'	Report	Imorou (yellow card) 26'; Oniangué (yellow card) 33'	Stadium: Stade Pierre-Mauroy; Attendance: 33,362; Referee: Florent Batta

2 November 2018 12	Paris Saint-Germain	2–1	Lille	Paris
20:45 CET (UTC+1)	Bernat (yellow card) 19'; Verratti (yellow card) 54'; Mbappé 70'; Neymar 84'	Report	Ballo-Touré (yellow card) 1'; Mendes (yellow card) 46'; Çelik (yellow card) 56'; Pépé 90+3' (pen.)	Stadium: Parc des Princes; Attendance: 47,549; Referee: François Letexier

9 November 2018 13	Lille	0–0	Strasbourg	Villeneuve-d'Ascq
20:45 CET (UTC+1)		Report	Aaneba (yellow card) 68'; Mothiba (yellow card) 83'	Stadium: Stade Pierre-Mauroy; Attendance: 27,544; Referee: Olivier Thual

25 November 2018 14	Nice	2–0	Lille	Nice
15:00 CET (UTC+1)	Cyprien 25'; Attal (yellow card) 72'; Saint-Maximin 79'	Report	Koné (yellow card) 48'; Xeka (yellow card) 62'; Maia (yellow card) 78'; Çelik (yellow card) 90+1'	Stadium: Allianz Riviera; Attendance: 18,211; Referee: Frank Schneider

1 December 2018 15	Lille	2–2	Lyon	Villeneuve-d'Ascq
17:00 CET (UTC+1)	Rémy 17'; Pépé 28'; Bamba (yellow card) 41'; Mendes (yellow card) 42'	Report	Depay (yellow card) 40'; Traoré 63'; Dembélé 86'	Stadium: Stade Pierre-Mauroy; Attendance: 38,755; Referee: Benoît Bastien

4 December 2018 16	Montpellier	0–1	Lille	Montpellier
21:00 CET (UTC+1)	Congré (yellow card) 52'; Aguilar (yellow card) 74'	Report	Pépé 6'; Ikoné (yellow card) 33'; Xeka (yellow card) 51'	Stadium: Stade de la Mosson; Attendance: 12,486; Referee: Mikael Lesage

9 December 2018 17	Lille	1–1	Reims	Villeneuve-d'Ascq
17:00 CET (UTC+1)	J. Fonte (yellow card) 72'; Pépé 90+6' (pen.)	Report	Foket (yellow card) 46'; Oudin 64'; Métanire (yellow card) 90+1'; Mendy (yellow card) 90+5'	Stadium: Stade Pierre-Mauroy; Attendance: 26,826; Referee: Willy Delajod

16 December 2018 18	Nîmes	2–3	Lille	Nîmes
15:00 CET (UTC+1)	Savanier (yellow card) 57'; Alioui 68'; Bouanga (yellow card) 74'; Ferri (yellow card) 79'; Depres 90+2'	Report	Leão 4'; Bamba (yellow card) 12', (goal) 41'; J. Fonte (red card) 16'; Ié (yellow card) 38'; Mendes (yellow card) 56'; Pépé 66'	Stadium: Stade des Costières; Attendance: 13,428; Referee: Hakim Ben El Hadj

22 December 2018 19	Lille	1–2	Toulouse	Villeneuve-d'Ascq
21:00 CET (UTC+1)	Leão 17'; Mendes (yellow card) 45+2'; Dabila (yellow card) 62'; Maia (yellow card) 66'	Report	Moubandje (yellow card) 38'; Durmaz (yellow card) 43'; Gradel 50' (pen.), 64' (pen.); Amian (yellow card) 71'; Sidibé (yellow card) 88'	Stadium: Stade Pierre-Mauroy; Attendance: 30,186; Referee: Benoît Millot

11 January 2019 20	Caen	1–3	Lille	Caen
19:00 CET (UTC+1)	Crivelli (yellow card) 27'; Diomandé (yellow card) 42'; Guilbert (yellow card) 44'; Ninga 90+5'	Report	Pépé 8'; Soumaoro (yellow card) 14'; Leão 20'; Çelik (red card) 85'; Luiz Araújo 90+3'	Stadium: Stade Michel d'Ornano; Attendance: 16,018; Referee: Thomas Léonard

18 January 2019 21	Lille	2–1	Amiens	Villeneuve-d'Ascq
20:45 CET (UTC+1)	Leão 45+2'; Xeka 85'	Report	Otero 5'; Gurtner (yellow card) 64'; Mendoza (yellow card) 90+2'; Lefort (yellow card) 90+3'	Stadium: Stade Pierre-Mauroy; Attendance: 27,211; Referee: Willy Delajod

25 January 2019 22	Marseille	1–2	Lille	Marseille
20:45 CET (UTC+1)	Kamara (yellow card) 18'; Luiz Gustavo (yellow card) 45+1'; Strootman (yellow card) 45+2'; Thauvin (red card) 67'; Radonjić (yellow card) 73'; Rolando (yellow card) 90'; Balotelli 90+6'	Report	Pépé 45+3' (pen.), 90+4'; Soumaoro (yellow card) 50'; Leão (yellow card) 66'; Xeka (yellow card) 70'	Stadium: Stade Vélodrome; Attendance: 45,940; Referee: Amaury Delerue

1 February 2019 23	Lille	4–0	Nice	Villeneuve-d'Ascq
20:45 CET (UTC+1)	Leão 8'; Pépé 37'; Koné (yellow card) 43'; Bamba 75'; Xeka (yellow card) 90+1'; Rémy 90+4'	Report	Lees-Melou (red card) 89'	Stadium: Stade Pierre-Mauroy; Attendance: 32,849; Referee: Jérôme Miguelgorry

10 February 2019 24	Guingamp	0–2	Lille	Guingamp
17:00 CET (UTC+1)	Ndong (yellow card) 33'; Mendy (yellow card) 79'	Report	Gabriel (yellow card) 31'; Leão 47'; Rémy 90+4' (pen.)	Stadium: Stade de Roudourou; Attendance: 13,886; Referee: Benoît Bastien

17 February 2019 25	Lille	0–0	Montpellier	Villeneuve-d'Ascq
15:00 CET (UTC+1)	Xeka (yellow card) 37'; Koné (yellow card) 44'; J. Fonte (yellow card) 78'	Report	Hilton (yellow card) 29'; Le Tallec (yellow card) 44'; Congré (yellow card) 56'	Stadium: Stade Pierre-Mauroy; Attendance: 36,967; Referee: Ruddy Buquet

22 February 2019 26	Strasbourg	1–1	Lille	Strasbourg
20:45 CET (UTC+1)	Ajorque (yellow card) 40'; Gonçalves 68'	Report	Leão (yellow card) 37'; Ikoné 42'	Stadium: Stade de la Meinau; Attendance: 25,303; Referee: Clément Turpin

3 March 2019 27	Lille	1–0	Dijon	Villeneuve-d'Ascq
15:00 CET (UTC+1)	Lautoa 72' (o.g.)	Report	Saïd (yellow card) 29'	Stadium: Stade Pierre-Mauroy; Attendance: 32,722; Referee: Olivier Thual

10 March 2019 28	Saint-Étienne	0–1	Lille	Saint-Étienne
15:00 CET (UTC+1)	M'Vila (yellow card) 52'; Debuchy (yellow card) 62' (yellow-red card) 90+1'; Kolodziejczak (yellow card) 70'; Khazri (red card) 90+4'	Report	Xeka (yellow card) 59'; Bamba (yellow card) 79'; Pépé 87'; Ikoné (yellow card) 90+1'	Stadium: Stade Geoffroy-Guichard; Attendance: 26,648; Referee: Mikael Lesage

15 March 2019 29	Lille	0–1	Monaco	Villeneuve-d'Ascq
20:45 CET (UTC+1)	Luiz Araújo (yellow card) 86'; J. Fonte (yellow card) 89'; R. Fonte (yellow card) 90+4'	Report	Jemerson (yellow card) 6'; Sidibé (yellow card) 82'; Vinícius 90'	Stadium: Stade Pierre-Mauroy; Attendance: 37,724; Referee: Hakim Ben El Hadj

31 March 2019 30	Nantes	2–3	Lille	Nantes
17:00 CEST (UTC+2)	Eysseric 54' (pen.), (yellow card) 72'; Coulibaly 56'; Pallois (yellow card) 75'	Report	Pépé (yellow card) 5', (goal) 68' (pen.); Mendes (yellow card) 53'; Leão 62', (yellow card) 74'; Bamba 69'	Stadium: Stade de la Beaujoire; Attendance: 25,045; Referee: Willy Delajod

7 April 2019 31	Reims	1–1	Lille	Reims
15:00 CEST (UTC+2)	Romao (yellow card) 40'; Rahman (yellow card) 43'; Oudin 78'	Report	Soumaoro (yellow card) 23'; Thiago Maia (yellow card) 30'; J. Fonte 55'	Stadium: Stade Auguste Delaune; Attendance: 18,642; Referee: Jérôme Brisard

14 April 2019 32	Lille	5–1	Paris Saint-Germain	Villeneuve-d'Ascq
21:00 CEST (UTC+2)	Meunier 7' (o.g.); Mendes (yellow card) 45+2'; Pépé 51'; Bamba 65'; Gabriel 71'; J. Fonte 84'	Report	Bernat 11', (red card) 36'; Mbappé (yellow card) 45+5'; Draxler (yellow card) 77'; Verratti (yellow card) 81'	Stadium: Stade Pierre-Mauroy; Attendance: 49,712; Referee: Benoît Bastien

21 April 2019 33	Toulouse	0–0	Lille	Toulouse
15:00 CEST (UTC+2)	Sidibé (yellow card) 23'; Gradel (yellow card) 41'	Report	Çelik (yellow card) 17'; Soumaré (yellow card) 52'; Mendes (yellow card) 85'	Stadium: Stadium Municipal; Attendance: 15,002; Referee: Nicolas Rainville

28 April 2019 34	Lille	5–0	Nîmes	Villeneuve-d'Ascq
15:00 CEST (UTC+2)	Rémy (yellow card) 25', (goal) 51'; Bamba 64'; Çelik 70'; Pépé 80'; R. Fonte 90+3'	Report	Miguel (yellow card) 32'; Bobichon (yellow card) 49'	Stadium: Stade Pierre-Mauroy; Attendance: 36,356; Referee: Amaury Delerue

5 May 2019 35	Lyon	2–2	Lille	Décines-Charpieu
21:00 CEST (UTC+2)	Terrier 11'; Dubois 74'	Report	Thiago Maia (yellow card) 44'; Rémy 50'; Soumaré 69'; Bamba (yellow card) 73'	Stadium: Parc Olympique Lyonnais; Attendance: 56,642; Referee: Clément Turpin

12 May 2019 36	Lille	1–0	Bordeaux	Villeneuve-d'Ascq
17:00 CEST (UTC+2)	Rémy 27', (yellow card) 47'; Soumaré (yellow card) 59'	Report	Plašil (yellow card) 29'; Adli (yellow card) 32'; Bašić (yellow card) 62'; Otávio (yellow card) 76'; Pablo (red card) 88'	Stadium: Stade Pierre-Mauroy; Attendance: 41,413; Referee: Mikael Lesage

18 May 2019 37	Lille	5–0	Angers	Villeneuve-d'Ascq
21:00 CEST (UTC+2)	Ikoné 2'; Pépé 14', 77' (pen.); Bamba 70'; Luiz Araújo 88', (yellow card) 88'	Report	Pavlović (yellow card) 24'; Pajot (yellow card) 39'; Aït-Nouri (yellow card) 76'	Stadium: Stade Pierre-Mauroy; Attendance: 42,704; Referee: François Letexier

24 May 2019 38	Rennes	3–1	Lille	Rennes
21:05 CEST (UTC+2)	Sarr (yellow card) 15', (goal) 59'; Niang 16' (pen.), 71'	Report	Rémy (yellow card) 15', (goal) 35'; Soumaoro (yellow card) 15'; Luiz Araújo (red card) 90'	Stadium: Roazhon Park; Attendance: 28,185; Referee: Olivier Thual

=== Coupe de France ===
7 January 2019 Round of 64	Lille	1–0	Sochaux	Villeneuve-d'Ascq
20:55 CET (UTC+1)	Luiz Araújo 40'; Soumaré (yellow card) 64'	Report	Páez (yellow card) 44'	Stadium: Stade Pierre-Mauroy; Attendance: 12,374; Referee: Florent Batta

22 January 2019 Round of 32	FC Sète 34	0–1	Lille	Sète
20:55 CET (UTC+1)		Report	Bamba 48'	Stadium: Stade Louis Michel; Attendance: 2,805; Referee: Karim Abed

6 February 2019 Round of 16	Rennes	2–1	Lille	Rennes
21:05 CET (UTC+1)	Traoré (yellow card) 44'; Bourigeaud (yellow card) 51'; Mexer (yellow card) 56'; Zeffane (yellow card) 71'; Siebatcheu 74', 90+1'	Report	Soumaoro (red card) 19'; Maignan (yellow card) 19'; Xeka (yellow card) 47'; Pépé 65'	Stadium: Roazhon Park; Attendance: 7,228; Referee: Mikael Lesage

=== Coupe de la Ligue ===
30 October 2018 Third round	Strasbourg	2–0	Lille	Strasbourg
21:05 CET (UTC+1)	Fofana 13'; Grimm (yellow card) 16'; Liénard 81'	Report	Luiz Araújo (yellow card) 82'	Stadium: Stade de la Meinau; Attendance: 16,821; Referee: Hakim Ben El Hadj

== Statistics ==
=== Appearances and goals ===
No.	Pos	Nat	Player	Total		Ligue 1		Coupe de France		Coupe de la Ligue	
No.	Pos	Nat	Player	Apps	Goals	Apps	Goals	Apps	Goals	Apps	Goals
Goalkeepers
1	GK	(Slovakia) SVK	Adam Jakubech	0	0	0	0	0	0	0	0
16	GK	(France) FRA	Mike Maignan	42	0	38	0	3	0	1	0
30	GK	(Burkina Faso) BFA	Kouakou Koffi	0	0	0	0	0	0	0	0
Defenders
3	DF	(Mali) MLI	Youssouf Koné	23	0	19+1	0	2	0	1	0
4	DF	(Brazil) BRA	Gabriel	17	1	11+3	1	1+1	0	1	0
5	DF	(France) FRA	Adama Soumaoro	22	0	20	0	2	0	0	0
6	DF	(Portugal) POR	José Fonte	38	3	36	3	2	0	0	0
17	DF	(Turkey) TUR	Zeki Çelik	36	1	34	1	2	0	0	0
22	DF	(Ivory Coast) CIV	Kouadio-Yves Dabila	16	0	8+4	0	1+2	0	1	0
26	DF	(France) FRA	Jérémy Pied	13	0	4+7	0	1	0	1	0
28	DF	(Mozambique) MOZ	Reinildo Mandava	3	0	1+2	0	0	0	0	0
34	DF	(France) FRA	Benjamin Vérité	0	0	0	0	0	0	0	0
Midfielders
8	MF	(Portugal) POR	Xeka	30	2	26+1	2	2	0	1	0
12	MF	(France) FRA	Jonathan Ikoné	41	3	34+4	3	2	0	0+1	0
20	MF	(Brazil) BRA	Thiago Maia	25	0	9+14	0	1	0	1	0
21	MF	(Serbia) SRB	Arton Zekaj	1	0	0+1	0	0	0	0	0
23	MF	(Brazil) BRA	Thiago Mendes	37	0	35	0	1+1	0	0	0
24	MF	(France) FRA	Boubakary Soumaré	22	1	5+13	1	2+1	0	1	0
Forwards
7	FW	(Portugal) POR	Rafael Leão	26	8	16+8	8	2	0	0	0
9	FW	(France) FRA	Loïc Rémy	29	7	14+12	7	1+1	0	1	0
10	FW	(Portugal) POR	Rui Fonte	20	1	5+13	1	0+1	0	0+1	0
11	FW	(Brazil) BRA	Luiz Araújo	29	4	6+19	3	2+1	1	1	0
14	FW	(France) FRA	Jonathan Bamba	41	14	35+3	13	3	1	0	0
19	FW	(Ivory Coast) CIV	Nicolas Pépé	41	23	37+1	22	2	1	0+1	0
Players transferred out during the season
—	DF	(Paraguay) PAR	Júnior Alonso	0	0	0	0	0	0	0	0
—	DF	(Morocco) MAR	Hamza Mendyl	0	0	0	0	0	0	0	0
15	DF	(Portugal) POR	Edgar Ié	3	0	0	0	1+1	0	1	0
25	DF	(France) FRA	Fodé Ballo-Touré	0	0	0	0	0	0	0	0
—	FW	(Netherlands) NED	Anwar El Ghazi	0	0	0	0	0	0	0	0
—	FW	(South Africa) RSA	Lebo Mothiba	0	0	0	0	0	0	0	0
—	FW	(Algeria) ALG	Yassine Benzia	0	0	0	0	0	0	0	0

Last updated: 24 May 2019
Source: Competitions
