= Gabriel Magalhães =

Brazilian footballer (born 1997)

Gabriel
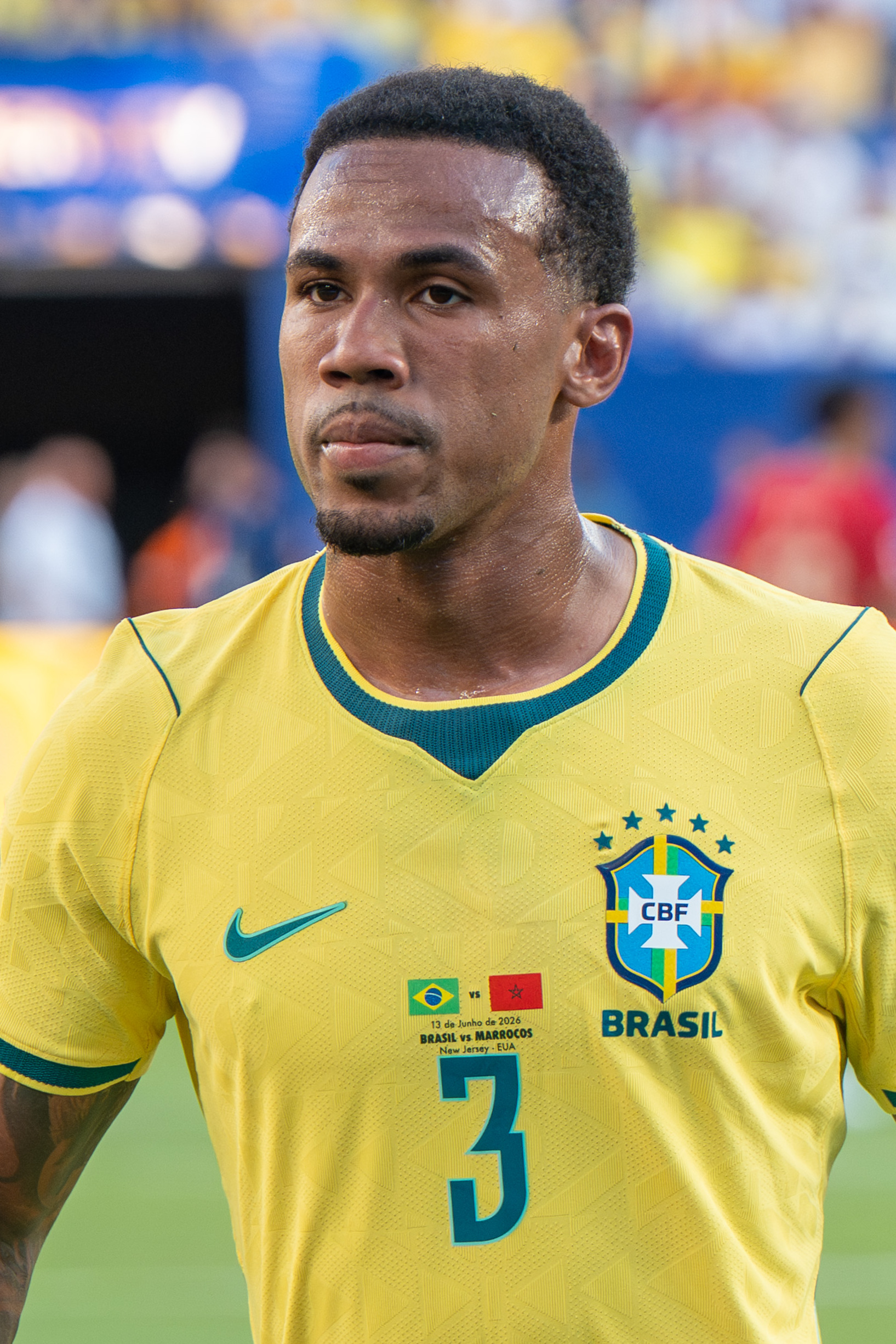
- Gabriel with Brazil in 2026

Personal information
- Full name: Gabriel dos Santos Magalhães
- Date of birth: 19 December 1997 (age 28)
- Place of birth: São Paulo, Brazil
- Height: 1.90 m (6 ft 3 in)
- Position: Centre-back

Team information
- Current team: Arsenal
- Number: 6

Youth career
- 2011–2016: Avaí

Senior career*
Years	Team	Apps	(Gls)
2016–2017	Avaí	34	(2)
2017–2018	Lille II	7	(0)
2017–2020	Lille	39	(2)
2017–2018	→ Troyes (loan)	1	(0)
2018	→ Dinamo Zagreb (loan)	1	(0)
2020–	Arsenal	203	(21)

International career^{‡}
2017	Brazil U20	7	(0)
2020–2021	Brazil U23	4	(0)
2023–	Brazil	26	(1)
- * Club domestic league appearances and goals as of 19:31, 21 November 2026 (UTC) ‡ National team caps and goals as of 12:20, 17 November 2026 (UTC)

Gabriel dos Santos Magalhães (Portuguese pronunciation: [ɡabɾiˈɛw dus ˈsɐ̃tuz maɡaˈʎɐ̃js]; born 19 December 1997), also known mononymously as Gabriel, is a Brazilian professional footballer who plays primarily as centre-back for Premier League club Arsenal and the Brazil national team. Known for his strength, aggression, tackling, passion and aerial threat, he is regarded as one of the best defenders in the world.

Gabriel began his senior club career at Avaí, having graduated from the club's youth academy in 2016. After Avaí achieved promotion to the Campeonato Brasileiro Série A the same year, he departed for French side Lille. Gabriel was loaned out to Troyes and Dinamo Zagreb before returning to Lille. In 2020, he signed for Arsenal in a deal worth £27m. In the 2025–26 season, Gabriel won the Premier League. He also finished as a runner-up in EFL Cup and the UEFA Champions League, missing the decisive penalty in the latter final.

Gabriel made his international debut for Brazil in 2023. He scored his first international goal during 2026 FIFA World Cup qualification.

== Club career ==
=== Avaí ===
Gabriel Magalhães was born in the Pirituba District of São Paulo. At age 13, Gabriel began his career at Avaí but returned to São Paulo after a week due to homesickness. However, he reconsidered his decision and returned to Avaí after two weeks, eventually going on to earn his first professional contract at age 16. He went on to be part of the team that won promotion to Brasileiro Série A in 2017.

=== Lille ===
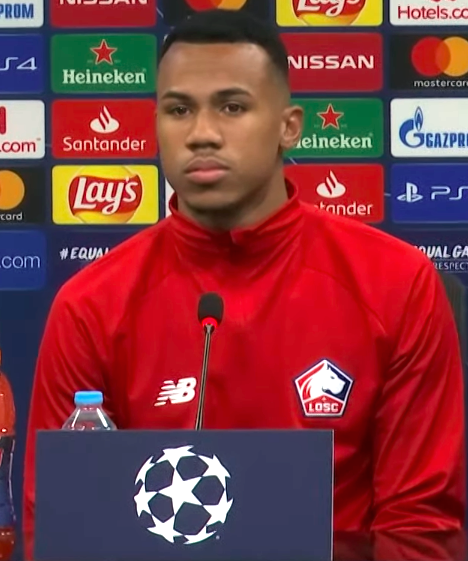
Gabriel with Lille in 2019

On 31 January 2017, Gabriel joined Ligue 1 side Lille, signing a four-and-a-half-year contract. Upon arriving in Lille, he taught himself French and went on to conduct most of his interviews in the language. After playing several matches for Lille II, he was loaned to fellow Ligue 1 side Troyes, before joining Croatian side Dinamo Zagreb, where he made just one league appearance for each club's senior team.

Gabriel returned to Lille in 2018, starting his first match on 10 February 2019 against relegation-threatened Guingamp in a 2–0 win. He went on to make 14 appearances over the course of the season, scoring his first goal for Lille in a 5–1 win against Paris Saint-Germain on 14 April 2019.

The following season, Gabriel began to play more regularly, forming a centre-back partnership with José Fonte. Gabriel was a starter in all six of Lille's Champions League group stage matches. On 31 January 2020, he extended his contract with Lille until 2023.

Lille manager Christophe Galtier spoke about the defender's patience, saying "I saw he had great potential and he was able to seize the first opportunity he got. He was hungry to play, and while he bided his time, he worked a lot. He's an example for other youngsters to follow. It's a sort of intelligence to behave like that. How often nowadays do you see players not working if they're not in the squad?"

=== Arsenal ===
On 1 September 2020, Arsenal announced the signing of Gabriel Magalhães on a long-term contract. Interest in the Brazilian was reportedly high, with multiple clubs willing to match the valuation set by Lille. Gabriel joined for a fee reaching the region of £27m after add-ons.

==== 2020–21 season ====
On 12 September, the opening day of the season, Gabriel made his debut for Arsenal, scoring the second goal in a 3–0 win against Fulham at Craven Cottage. Following his performance in Arsenal's 2–1 win against West Ham United on 19 September 2020, Gabriel was awarded Arsenal's player of the month award for September. He won the award again in October after featuring in five of Arsenal's six games in the month. Arsenal manager Mikel Arteta spoke highly of Gabriel's early performances, saying "you move him from France to here at an early age, without talking the language, to adapt to a new way of playing as well... [but] he has done it really quickly and is showing a great mentality as well."

Despite Arsenal's poor form in late 2020, Gabriel was awarded his third player of the month award in December after his performances in Arsenal's 1–0 win against Manchester United on 1 November and their 0–0 draw against Leeds United on 22 November. On 29 November, Gabriel scored his first goal at the Emirates during Arsenal's 2–1 defeat to Wolverhampton Wanderers. Gabriel received his first red card for Arsenal on 16 December in a home game against Southampton, after being given two yellow cards in the space of five minutes for fouls on Ché Adams and Theo Walcott.

==== 2021–22 season ====
Gabriel played in all but three of Arsenal's Premier League games. He scored his first goal of the season in a 2–0 win against Leicester City at the King Power Stadium on 30 October 2021.

He scored the only goal of the game as Arsenal beat Wolverhampton Wanderers at Molineux on 10 February, and also got the winning goal against West Ham in a 2–1 win at the London Stadium on 1 May. Gabriel finished the season with five Premier League goals.

==== 2022–23 season ====
Gabriel scored the winning goal against Fulham in the Premier League on 27 August 2022. He had made a mistake that allowed Aleksandar Mitrović to open the scoring, but his goal in the 86th minute gave Arsenal all three points in a 2–1 win. His partnership with William Saliba was a cornerstone of the Gunners' success throughout the season. On 21 October 2022, Arsenal announced that Gabriel had signed a new long-term contract with the club. He scored the only goal of the game as Arsenal beat Chelsea at Stamford Bridge in November.

On 12 March 2023, he scored against Fulham again, heading in Arsenal's first goal in their 3–0 win at Craven Cottage. This was his third goal in four games against the Cottagers.

==== 2023–24 season ====
On 17 September 2023, Gabriel made his 100th Premier League appearance in Arsenal's win against Everton at Goodison Park. He scored his first goal of the 2023–24 season in a 1–1 draw with Liverpool at Anfield.

Gabriel scored the first two goals in Arsenal's 5–0 win against Crystal Palace on 20 January 2024. The second goal had initially been credited as an own goal by Palace goalkeeper Dean Henderson. Arsenal appealed the decision, and the Premier League's Goal Accreditation Appeals Panel subsequently awarded the goal to Gabriel. It was his first brace for the club.

Gabriel made his 150th Arsenal appearance on 11 February, scoring the third goal against West Ham in a 6–0 win at the London Stadium.

==== 2024–25 season ====
On 15 September 2024, Gabriel headed in a 64th minute corner in the North London derby, sealing a 1–0 away win for Arsenal.

The following week, Gabriel scored the second goal of two for Arsenal during a 2–2 away draw at Manchester City. In this game he was involved in a two-team altercation after John Stones scored a 98th minute equalizer which sparked rivalry between the two teams; especially between himself and Erling Haaland. He continued this style of goalscoring, netting headers in consecutive away matches against Sporting CP and West Ham United in November.

On 1 April 2025, Gabriel suffered a hamstring injury during a 2–1 win against Fulham, which would sideline him for the remainder of the season. On 6 June, Gabriel signed a new long-term deal with Arsenal.

==== 2025–26 season: Premier League Champion ====
During the 2025–26 season, Gabriel helped Arsenal win the Premier League title, He scored a stoppage-time winner against Newcastle United in a 2–1 away win. He also scored league goals against Aston Villa and Bournemouth.

In the UEFA Champions League, Gabriel recorded a goal and an assist in the league phase against Atlético Madrid. In the final against Paris Saint-Germain on 30 May 2026, he missed the decisive penalty in the shootout as Arsenal were defeated. However, he was named in the competition's Team of the Season.

==== 2026–27 season ====
Gabriel made his 200th Premier League appearance on 24 October 2026. He marked the occasion by scoring Arsenal's second goal in the Gunners' 2–0 home win against Everton.

== International career ==
Gabriel represented Brazil at under-20 level at the 2017 South American U-20 Championship. On 14 November 2020, he made his international debut with Brazil's under-23 national team in a 3–1 victory against South Korea's under-23s in an international friendly. On 17 June 2021, he was named in the squad for the 2020 Summer Olympics, but was forced to withdraw with a knee injury on 6 July.

In August 2023, Gabriel received his first call-up to the Brazil senior national team by interim head coach Fernando Diniz, for two 2026 FIFA World Cup qualification matches against Bolivia and Peru. On 9 September 2023, Gabriel debuted in a 5–1 win against Bolivia during the same tournament, where he was later substituted off for Roger Ibañez in the 84th minute due to injury concerns. Gabriel scored his first international goal just two games later against Venezuela, heading it in from a Neymar corner kick.

On 18 May 2026, Gabriel was selected for Brazil's squad for the 2026 FIFA World Cup.

== Style of play ==
Gabriel can play as part of a back three and is known for his partnership with William Saliba. Despite his height, Gabriel is known for being fast. Christophe Galtier spoke about Gabriel, saying "He has a lot of character for a 22-year-old boy. Despite his 190cm height, he is super fast and covers his side well. He is the player who has won the most aerial duels in the first part of the season." Gabriel is also known for his distribution ability, generally looking to play the ball forward or to the left-back. In the 2019–20 season, Gabriel completed the most passes into the opposition half in all of Ligue 1. According to his Lille teammate and mentor José Fonte, Gabriel "has to keep defending well by being aggressive, being well positioned, and not taking risks." Furthermore, Gabriel is renowned for his aerial threat, and henceforth is known to pose a goal threat from set pieces.

== Personal life ==
In September 2021, Gabriel announced his engagement to his partner Gabrielle Figueiredo, and the couple got married in June 2023. Their daughter was born in March 2022, who they named Maya. Magalhães is also cousin of the professional footballer Denner.

A native of São Paulo, Gabriel is a declared supporter of Corinthians, despite having started his professional career at Avaí. He frequently attends matches at the Arena Corinthians during his off-season holidays in Brazil, often being spotted by fans in the stands. Gabriel has publicly expressed his desire to play for the club in the future, stating in interviews that representing Corinthians is a professional ambition and a childhood dream.

== Career statistics ==
=== Club ===
As of match played 4 November 2026

Appearances and goals by club, season and competition
Club	Season	League			State league (Note: Includes Campeonato Catarinense)		National cup (Note: Includes Copa do Brasil, Coupe de France, FA Cup)		League cup (Note: Includes Coupe de la Ligue, EFL Cup)		Continental		Other		Total	
Club	Season	Division	Apps	Goals	Apps	Goals	Apps	Goals	Apps	Goals	Apps	Goals	Apps	Goals	Apps	Goals
Avaí	2016	Série B	21	1	13	1	4	0	—		—		1 (Note: Appearance in Primeira Liga (Brazil))	0	39	2
Lille	2016–17	Ligue 1	1	0	—		0	0	0	0	0	0	—		1	0
Lille	2018–19	Ligue 1	14	1	—		2	0	1	0	—		—		17	1
Lille	2019–20	Ligue 1	24	1	—		1	0	3	0	6 (Note: Appearances in UEFA Champions League)	0	—		34	1
Lille	Total		39	2	—		3	0	4	0	6	0	—		52	2
Troyes (loan)	2017–18	Ligue 1	1	0	—		2	0	1	0	—		—		4	0
Dinamo Zagreb (loan)	2017–18	Prva HNL	1	0	—		0	0	—		—		—		1	0
Arsenal	2020–21	Premier League	23	2	—		1	0	2	0	6 (Note: Appearances in UEFA Europa League)	1	—		32	3
Arsenal	2021–22	Premier League	35	5	—		0	0	3	0	—		—		38	5
Arsenal	2022–23	Premier League	38	3	—		2	0	1	0	7	0	—		48	3
Arsenal	2023–24	Premier League	36	4	—		1	0	2	0	10	0	1 (Note: Appearance in FA Community Shield)	0	50	4
Arsenal	2024–25	Premier League	28	3	—		1	1	4	0	9	1	—		42	5
Arsenal	2025–26	Premier League	32	3	—		2	0	5	0	12	1	—		51	4
Arsenal	2026–27	Premier League	9	1	—		0	0	1	0	4	0	1	0	15	1
Arsenal	Total		201	21	—		7	1	18	0	48	3	2	0	276	25
Career total			263	24	13	1	16	1	23	0	53	3	3	0	372	29

=== International ===
As of match played 17 November 2026

Appearances and goals by national team and year
National team	Year	Apps	Goals
Brazil
Brazil	2023	6	1
Brazil	2024	7	0
Brazil	2025	4	0
Brazil	2026	9	0
Total		26	1

As of match played 3 October 2026
Brazil score listed first, score column indicates score after each Gabriel goal.

List of international goals scored by Gabriel Magalhães
No.	Date	Venue	Cap	Opponent	Score	Result	Competition	Ref.
1	12 October 2023	Arena Pantanal, Cuiabá, Brazil	3	Venezuela	1–0	1–1	2026 FIFA World Cup qualification	

== Honours ==
Dinamo Zagreb

- Prva HNL: 2017–18
- Croatian Cup: 2017–18

Arsenal

- Premier League: 2025–26
- FA Community Shield: 2023, 2026
- EFL Cup runner-up: 2025–26
- UEFA Champions League runner-up: 2025–26

Individual

- PFA Team of the Year: 2023–24 Premier League, 2024–25 Premier League, 2025–26 Premier League
- Premier League Fan Team of the Season: 2023–24, 2025–26
- IFFHS Men's CONMEBOL Team: 2024
- Ballon d'Or nominee: 2026
- UEFA Champions League Team of the Season: 2025–26
