= Luigi Liguori =

Italian footballer

Personal information
- Date of birth: 31 March 1998 (age 28)
- Place of birth: Naples, Italy
- Height: 1.67 m (5 ft 6 in)
- Position: Winger

Team information
- Current team: Gladiator
- Number: 10

Youth career
- Ternana
- –2015: Mariano Keller
- 2015–2017: Napoli

Senior career*
Years	Team	Apps	(Gls)
2017–2018	Napoli	0	(0)
2017–2018	→ Cosenza (loan)	8	(0)
2018	→ Fidelis Andria (loan)	1	(0)
2018–2019	Bari	12	(1)
2019–2020	Napoli	0	(0)
2019–2020	→ Fermana (loan)	9	(1)
2020–2021	Lille	0	(0)
2020–2021	→ Fermana (loan)	11	(0)
2021	→ Lecco (loan)	4	(1)
2021	AC Afragolese 1944	1	(0)
2021	Frattese		
2021–2022	Ercolanese 1924		
2022–2023	Casoria 1979		
2023–2024	AC Afragolese 1944		
2024	Portici 1906		
2024–	Gladiator	0	(0)
- * Club domestic league appearances and goals as of 4 November 2026

Luigi Liguori (born 31 March 1998) is an Italian footballer who plays as a winger for Italian Serie D club Gladiator.

== Club career ==
=== Napoli ===
==== Loan to Cosenza and Fidelis Andria ====
On 18 July 2017, Liguori was signed by Serie C club Cosenza on a season-long loan deal. On 30 July he made his professional debut as a substitute replacing Gennaro Tutino in the 59th minute of a 3–2 home defeat, after extra-time, against Alessandria in the first round of Coppa Italia. On 26 August he made his Serie C debut for Cosenza as a substitute replacing Giuseppe Statella in the 66th minute of a 3–1 away defeat against Monopoli. In January 2018, Liguri was re-called to Napoli leaving Cosenza with 9 appearances, all as a substitute.

On 31 January 2018, Liguori was loaned to Serie C side Fidelis Andria on a 6-month loan deal. On 11 February he made his debut for Fidelis Andria as a substitute replacing Lorenzo Longo in the 70th minute of a 2–0 away defeat against Monopoli. Liguori ended his 6-month loan to Fidelis Andria with only 1 appearance.

=== Bari ===
On 1 August 2018, Liguori joined to Serie D side Bari with an undisclosed fee.

=== Back to Napoli ===
==== Loan to Fermana ====
In the summer 2019, he returned to Napoli. On 15 July 2019, he was loaned to Serie C club Fermana.

=== Lille ===
On 1 September 2020, he moved to French club Lille as part of the transfer of Victor Osimhen from Lille to Napoli.

==== Second loan to Fermana ====
On 19 September 2020, he returned to Fermana on loan.

==== Loan to Lecco ====
On 1 February 2021, he was loaned to Lecco.

== Career statistics ==
=== Club ===
As of 24 February 2018

Club	Season	League			Cup		Europe		Other		Total	
Club	Season	League	Apps	Goals	Apps	Goals	Apps	Goals	Apps	Goals	Apps	Goals
Cosenza (loan)	2017–18	Serie C	8	0	1	0	—		—		9	0
Fidelis Andria (loan)	2017–18	Serie C	1	0	—		—		—		1	0
Bari	2018–19	Serie D	0	0	—		—		—		0	0
Career total			9	0	1	0	—		—		10	0
