= Darly Nlandu =

French footballer (born 2000)

Personal information
- Full name: Darly Nlandu Lufuilu
- Date of birth: 14 July 2000 (age 26)
- Place of birth: Creil, France
- Height: 1.73 m (5 ft 8 in)
- Position: Midfielder

Team information
- Current team: Guingamp
- Number: 6

Youth career
- 2006–2014: AFC Creil
- 2014: US Municipale Senlis
- 2014–2015: Beauvais Oise
- 2015–2020: Lille

Senior career*
Years	Team	Apps	(Gls)
2018–2020	Lille B	33	(2)
2020–2022	Lille	0	(0)
2020–2021	→ Mouscron (loan)	11	(0)
2021–2022	→ Avranches (loan)	14	(0)
2021–2022	→ Avranches B (loan)	5	(2)
2022–2024	Radomlje	46	(2)
2024–2025	Radnički 1923	7	(0)
2025	Omonia 29M	11	(2)
2025–	Guingamp	15	(2)

International career
2016	France U16	1	(0)
2016	France U17	6	(1)
- * Club domestic league appearances and goals as of 11 May 2026

Darly Nlandu Lufuilu (born 14 July 2000) is a French professional footballer who plays as a midfielder for Ligue 2 club Guingamp.

== International career ==
Born in France, Nlandu is of Congolese descent. He was a youth international for France.

== Career statistics ==
=== Club ===
As of 12 November 2020

Club	Season	League			National cup		Continental		Other		Total	
Club	Season	Division	Apps	Goals	Apps	Goals	Apps	Goals	Apps	Goals	Apps	Goals
Lille B	2017–18	Championnat National 2	3	0	—		—		0	0	3	0
Lille B	2018–19	Championnat National 2	11	1	—		—		0	0	11	1
Lille B	2019–20	Championnat National 2	19	1	—		—		0	0	19	1
Lille B	Total		33	2	0	0	0	0	0	0	33	2
Lille	2020–21	Ligue 1	0	0	0	0	0	0	0	0	0	0
Mouscron (loan)	2020–21	Jupiler Pro League	5	0	0	0	—		0	0	5	0
Career total			38	2	0	0	0	0	0	0	38	2
