= Ciro Palmieri =

Italian footballer (born 2000)

Personal information
- Date of birth: 1 February 2000 (age 26)
- Place of birth: Naples, Italy
- Height: 1.77 m (5 ft 10 in)
- Position: Forward

Team information
- Current team: Angri
- Number: 7

Youth career
- –2020: Napoli

Senior career*
Years	Team	Apps	(Gls)
2020–2021	Lille	0	(0)
2020–2021	→ Fermana (loan)	22	(0)
2021–2022	Nocerina	26	(6)
2022	Palmese	10	(1)
2022–2023	Nola	19	(7)
2023–	Angri	16	(4)
- * Club domestic league appearances and goals as of 20 December 2023

Ciro Palmieri (born 1 February 2000) is an Italian footballer who plays as an attacker for Serie D club Angri.

== Career ==
At the age of 13, Palmieri trialed for the youth academy of Chelsea, one of England's most successful clubs, amid interest from the youth academies of Arsenal and Fulham in the English Premier League but the transfer never happened.

In 2020, he signed for French Ligue 1 side Lille from the youth academy of Napoli in the Italian Serie A, before being sent on loan to Italian third division club Fermana.

In August 2021 he was signed by Nocerina.
