= José Fonte =

Portuguese footballer (born 1983)

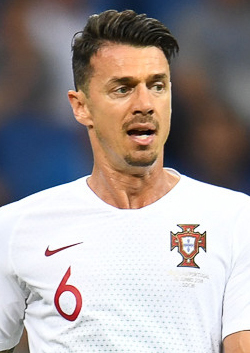
- Fonte with Portugal at the 2018 FIFA World Cup

Personal information
- Full name: José Miguel da Rocha Fonte
- Date of birth: 22 December 1983 (age 42)
- Place of birth: Penafiel, Portugal
- Height: 1.91 m (6 ft 3 in)
- Position: Centre-back

Youth career
- 1991–1994: Penafiel
- 1994–2002: Sporting CP
- 1997–2000: → Sacavenense (loan)

Senior career*
Years	Team	Apps	(Gls)
2002–2004	Sporting CP B	59	(0)
2004–2005	Felgueiras	28	(1)
2005–2006	Vitória Setúbal	15	(0)
2006–2008	Benfica	0	(0)
2006	→ Paços Ferreira (loan)	11	(1)
2006–2007	→ Estrela Amadora (loan)	25	(1)
2007–2008	→ Crystal Palace (loan)	22	(1)
2008–2010	Crystal Palace	60	(5)
2010–2017	Southampton	260	(15)
2017–2018	West Ham United	24	(0)
2018	Dalian Yifang	7	(0)
2018–2023	Lille	166	(8)
2023–2024	Braga	19	(0)
2024–2026	Casa Pia	43	(1)
Total		739	(33)

International career
2006	Portugal U21	1	(0)
2006	Portugal B	1	(0)
2014–2022	Portugal	50	(1)
Medal record
Men's football
Representing Portugal
UEFA European Championship
Winner	2016 France
UEFA Nations League
Winner	2019 Portugal
FIFA Confederations Cup
Third place	2017 Russia
- * Club domestic league appearances and goals

José Miguel da Rocha Fonte ComM (born 22 December 1983) is a Portuguese former professional footballer who played as a centre-back.

He started his 24-year senior career with Sporting CP B, moving to England with Crystal Palace in 2007. He signed for Southampton in 2010, where he made 288 appearances in all competitions until he joined West Ham United in January 2017. He then represented Dalian Yifang in China and Lille in France, winning the Ligue 1 title with the latter in the 2020–21 season.

A Portuguese international from age 30, Fonte was part of the Portugal squads at two European Championships and the 2018 World Cup, winning Euro 2016.

== Club career ==
=== Portugal ===
Born in Penafiel, Fonte finished his football education (after already having played there from ages 10 to 13) at Sporting CP. He only appeared with Sporting CP B as a senior, in the third division. He joined Salgueiros in 2004, but the club was in severe financial difficulties and was liquidated shortly after; as a result, he terminated his contract and transferred to Felgueiras of Segunda Liga.

In the 2005 off-season, Fonte made his Primeira Liga debut with Vitória de Setúbal, where his performances attracted the eye of Benfica, who signed him in January 2006 and immediately loaned him to Paços de Ferreira in the same league. He finished the season with 26 appearances and one goal, in a 2–2 away draw against Penafiel in which he also scored twice in his own net; both Paços and Setúbal managed to retain their status.

Fonte spent the 2006–07 season on loan to Estrela da Amadora, still in the top division, only missing five games as the Lisbon-based club finished in ninth position.

=== Crystal Palace ===
In July 2007, Fonte moved on loan to Crystal Palace in England, being introduced in the team's starting line-up after a run of injuries. The move was made permanent at the end of the campaign, as Palace finished fifth and qualified to the promotion play-offs.

Fonte continued to feature regularly with the Londoners in the Championship, even appearing as a makeshift striker when required.

=== Southampton ===
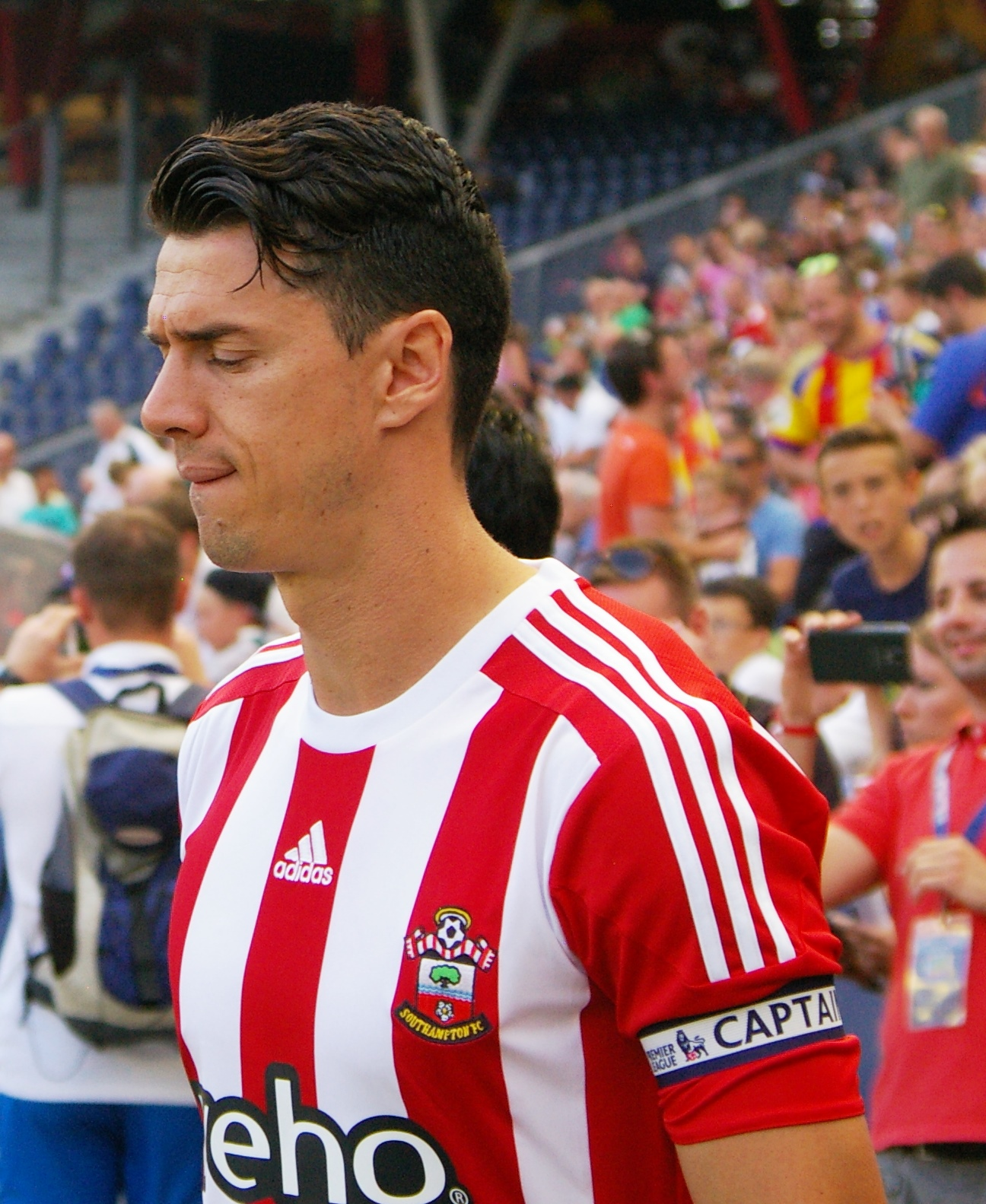
Fonte playing for Southampton in 2015

Fonte signed for Southampton on 9 January 2010 for a fee believed to be around the region of £1.2 million, signing a three-and-a-half-year contract. He made his debut one week later alongside two other recent signings, Jon Otsemobor and Danny Seaborne, in a 1–1 draw away to Millwall. His first goal came on 28 August, in a 4–0 away win over Bristol Rovers.

After scoring seven league goals and helping the Saints win promotion to the second tier, Fonte was named in the League One Team of the Year for 2010–11. He was also voted Southampton's Player of Year, achieving 64% of the vote, with Adam Lallana coming second with 18% and Dan Harding finishing third with 7%.

On 29 December 2011, Fonte penned a new deal keeping him at the club until June 2015; Southampton were top of the table at that point, with the player having appeared in every league game. He eventually contributed 42 matches and one goal, which came against Coventry City in the final fixture of the season as the team earned a second consecutive promotion.

Fonte made his debut in the Premier League on 19 August 2012, playing the full 90 minutes in a 3–2 away loss to Manchester City. He netted his first goals in the competition in a 2–2 home draw with Fulham on 7 October, the second arriving in the last minute.

On 24 August 2013, Fonte scored a header in the 89th minute of the home game against Sunderland, rescuing a point for his side. The following 23 January, he was attacked by teammate Dani Osvaldo during a training session; subsequently, the latter was loaned out to Juventus in the winter transfer window.

On 8 August 2014, Fonte signed a new three-year contract running until June 2017, and was also named team captain. He made his 250th league appearance for Southampton on 16 October 2016, in a 3–1 home victory over Burnley.

=== West Ham United ===
On 20 January 2017, Fonte joined English top-flight West Ham United for a reported fee of £8 million (plus potential add-ons) on a two-and-a-half-year contract. He made his league debut on 1 February, in a 4–0 home defeat by Manchester City in which he conceded a penalty by bringing down Raheem Sterling.

On 4 November 2017, after a league match against his former employers Crystal Palace, it was confirmed Fonte had suffered a foot injury that would sideline him for the rest of the year.

=== Dalian Yifang ===
Fonte completed a transfer to Chinese Super League club Dalian Yifang on 23 February 2018, joining for a reported fee of £5 million. On 15 July, he terminated his contract.

=== Lille ===
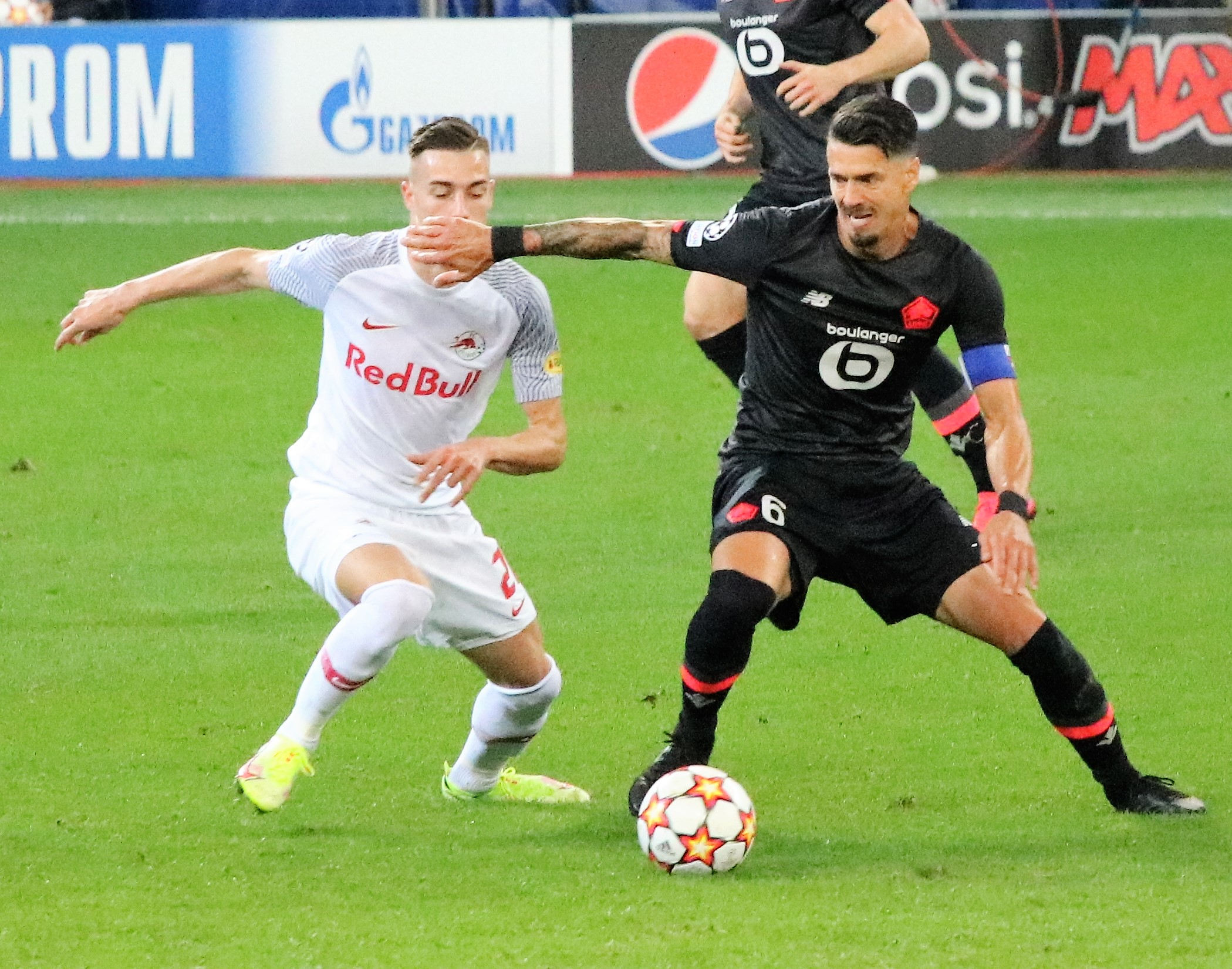
Fonte (right) in action against Salzburg in the Champions League in 2021

Fonte signed a two-year contract with Lille on 20 July 2018. He made his Ligue 1 debut on 18 August as the season began with a goalless draw at Monaco, and scored his first goal on 22 September to open a 2–1 win at home to Nantes while assisting the other goal by Jonathan Ikoné. On 16 December, he was sent off after 16 minutes of a 3–2 victory at Nîmes for swearing at an assistant referee, as was manager Christophe Galtier for arguing his case; he missed just two games as the Dogues finished runners-up to Paris Saint-Germain, scoring three times including the conclusion of a 5–1 victory over that opposition at the Stade Pierre-Mauroy on 14 April.

On 9 August 2019, Fonte agreed to an extension until 2021. The 37-year-old captained the team to the national championship in the 2020–21 campaign, their first since 2010–11, making 36 appearances and scoring three times in the process.

After adding one more year to his contract, Fonte played in the Trophée des Champions on 1 August 2021, a 1–0 defeat of PSG in Tel Aviv. He renewed again for 2022–23, after which he was released.

=== Later career ===
On 19 July 2023, Fonte signed a one-year contract with Braga. One year later, the 40-year-old remained in the Portuguese top flight on a one-year deal at Casa Pia.

On 28 May 2026, Fonte announced his retirement from professional football.

== International career ==
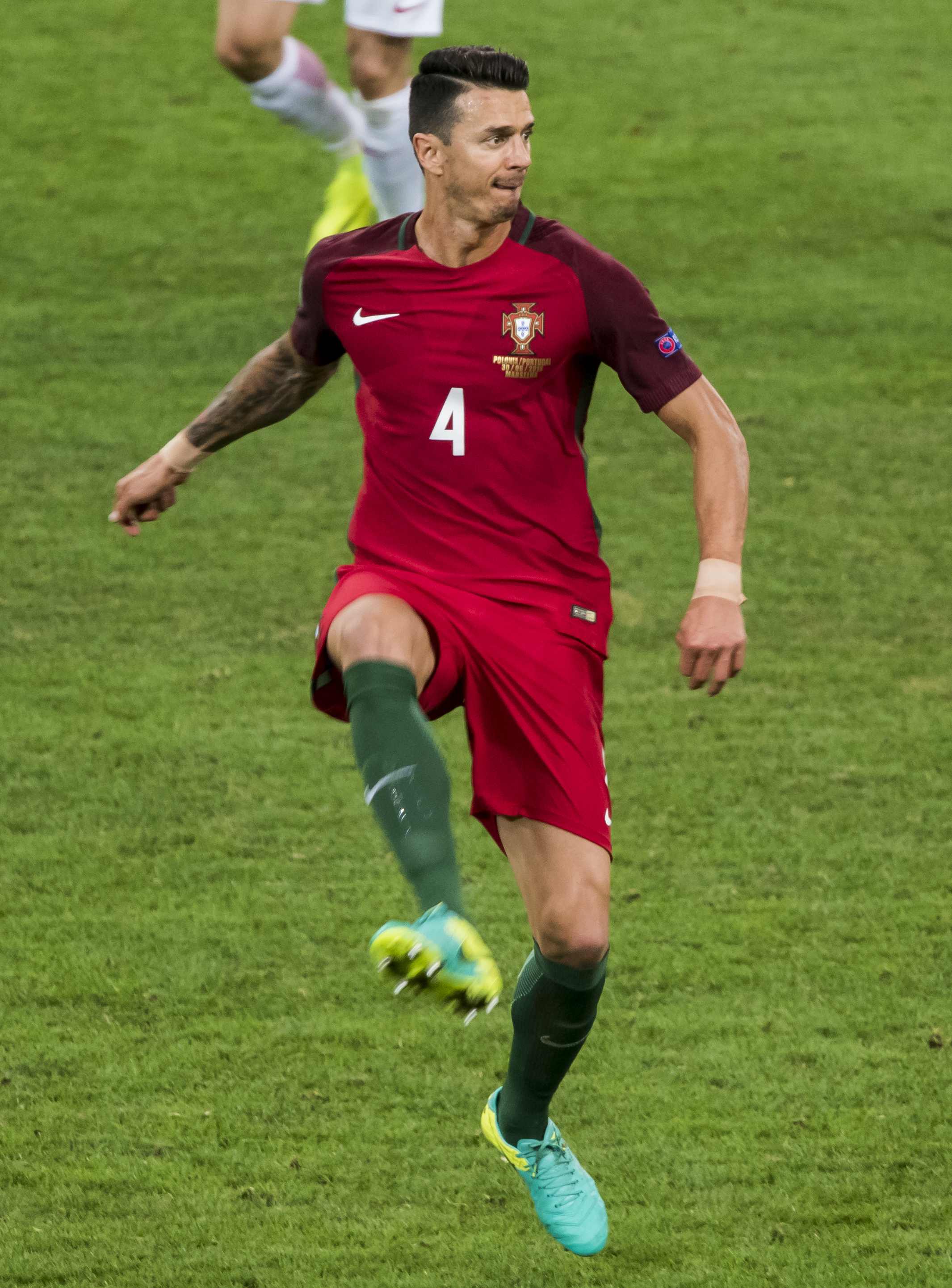
Fonte playing for Portugal at UEFA Euro 2016

Fonte was selected for the Portugal B squad for the Vale do Tejo tournament in 2006. On 24 January, he played against Slovenia as the match ended with a penalty shoot-out loss after a 1–1 draw.

On 3 October 2014, two months shy of his 31st birthday, Fonte received his first call-up to the senior team, for a friendly with France and a UEFA Euro 2016 qualifier against Denmark. He made his debut in another friendly, playing the second half of a 1–0 win over Argentina at Old Trafford on 18 November.

Fonte was included in Fernando Santos' squad for the Euro 2016 finals. His first game in the tournament took place on 25 June, as he started alongside Southampton teammate Cédric Soares in the round-of-16 tie against Croatia, which Portugal won 1–0 after extra time. He went on to retain his position until the final, helping to beat hosts France 1–0.

Fonte was also called up for both the 2018 FIFA World Cup in Russia (four appearances as starter) the victorious 2019 UEFA Nations League Finals (both matches, one start) and the delayed UEFA Euro 2020, where he did not leave the bench. On 9 October 2021, he scored his only goal for the national team, in a 3–0 friendly win over Qatar.

On 24 March 2022, aged 38, Fonte earned his 50th cap in a World Cup qualifying play-offs against Turkey, where he gave away a second-half penalty for a kick at Enes Ünal; however, his Lille teammate Burak Yılmaz missed the shot and the game ended 3–1 for Portugal. He was named in a preliminary 55-man squad for the finals in Qatar, but did not make the final cut.

== Coaching career ==
On 9 July 2026, Fonte joined Régis Le Bris' coaching staff at Sunderland.

== Personal life ==
Fonte's younger brother, Rui, was also a footballer. A forward, the two were teammates at Sporting (youth level), Crystal Palace and Lille. Their father Artur played 12 seasons in the Portuguese top division.

== Career statistics ==
=== Club ===
Appearances and goals by club, season and competition
Club	Season	League			National cup (Note: Includes Taça de Portugal, FA Cup, Chinese FA Cup, Coupe de France)		League cup (Note: Includes Football League Cup, Coupe de la Ligue, Taça da Liga)		Continental		Other		Total	
Club	Season	Division	Apps	Goals	Apps	Goals	Apps	Goals	Apps	Goals	Apps	Goals	Apps	Goals
Sporting CP B	2002–03	Segunda Divisão B	22	0	—		—		—		—		22	0
Sporting CP B	2003–04	Segunda Divisão B	37	0	—		—		—		—		37	0
Sporting CP B	Total		59	0	—		—		—		—		59	0
Felgueiras	2004–05	Segunda Liga	28	1	1	0	—		—		—		29	1
Vitória Setúbal	2005–06	Primeira Liga	15	0	0	0	—		2 (Note: Appearances in UEFA Cup/Europa League)	0	—		17	0
Benfica	2005–06	Primeira Liga	0	0	0	0	—		0	0	—		0	0
Benfica	2006–07	Primeira Liga	0	0	0	0	—		0	0	—		0	0
Benfica	2007–08	Primeira Liga	0	0	0	0	—		0	0	—		0	0
Benfica	Total		0	0	0	0	—		0	0	—		0	0
Paços Ferreira (loan)	2005–06	Primeira Liga	11	1	0	0	—		—		—		11	1
Estrela Amadora (loan)	2006–07	Primeira Liga	25	1	2	0	—		—		—		27	1
Crystal Palace (loan)	2007–08	Championship	22	1	1	0	1	0	—		2 (Note: Appearances in Championship play-offs)	0	26	1
Crystal Palace	2008–09	Championship	38	4	2	0	1	0	—		—		41	4
Crystal Palace	2009–10	Championship	22	1	1	0	2	0	—		0	0	25	1
Crystal Palace	Total		82	6	4	0	4	0	—		2	0	92	6
Southampton	2009–10	League One	21	0	0	0	0	0	—		3 (Note: Appearances in Football League Trophy)	0	24	0
Southampton	2010–11	League One	43	7	2	0	2	0	—		1	0	48	7
Southampton	2011–12	Championship	42	1	1	0	1	0	—		—		44	1
Southampton	2012–13	Premier League	27	2	1	0	0	0	—		—		28	2
Southampton	2013–14	Premier League	36	3	1	0	1	0	—		—		38	3
Southampton	2014–15	Premier League	37	0	3	0	4	0	—		—		44	0
Southampton	2015–16	Premier League	37	2	1	0	1	0	4	0	—		43	2
Southampton	2016–17	Premier League	17	0	0	0	2	0	0	0	—		19	0
Southampton	Total		260	15	9	0	11	0	4	0	4	0	288	15
West Ham United	2016–17	Premier League	16	0	0	0	0	0	—		—		16	0
West Ham United	2017–18	Premier League	8	0	0	0	0	0	—		—		8	0
West Ham United	Total		24	0	0	0	0	0	—		—		24	0
Dalian Yifang	2018	Chinese Super League	7	0	2	0	—		—		—		9	0
Lille	2018–19	Ligue 1	36	3	2	0	0	0	—		—		38	3
Lille	2019–20	Ligue 1	25	1	2	1	2	0	4 (Note: Appearances in UEFA Champions League)	0	—		33	2
Lille	2020–21	Ligue 1	36	3	1	0	—		6	0	—		43	3
Lille	2021–22	Ligue 1	38	0	2	0	—		8	0	1 (Note: Appearance in Trophée des Champions)	0	49	0
Lille	2022–23	Ligue 1	31	1	2	0	—		—		—		33	1
Lille	Total		166	8	9	1	2	0	18	0	1	0	196	9
Braga	2023–24	Primeira Liga	19	0	2	0	4	0	8	0	—		33	0
Casa Pia	2024–25	Primeira Liga	25	0	1	0	0	0	—		—		26	0
Casa Pia	2025–26	Primeira Liga	18	1	2	0	0	0	—		0	0	20	1
Casa Pia	Total		43	1	3	0	0	0	—		0	0	46	1
Career total			739	33	32	1	21	0	32	0	7	0	831	34

=== International ===
Appearances and goals by national team and year
National team	Year	Apps	Goals
Portugal	2014	1	0
Portugal	2015	7	0
Portugal	2016	12	0
Portugal	2017	7	0
Portugal	2018	9	0
Portugal	2019	6	0
Portugal	2020	1	0
Portugal	2021	6	1
Portugal	2022	1	0
Total		50	1

Scores and results list Portugal's goal tally first, score column indicates score after each Fonte goal.

List of international goals scored by José Fonte
No.	Date	Venue	Opponent	Score	Result	Competition
1	9 October 2021	Estádio Algarve, Faro/Loulé, Portugal	Qatar	2–0	3–0	Friendly

== Honours ==
Southampton

- Football League Trophy: 2009–10

Lille

- Ligue 1: 2020–21
- Trophée des Champions: 2021

Braga

- Taça da Liga: 2023–24

Portugal

- UEFA European Championship: 2016
- UEFA Nations League: 2018–19
- FIFA Confederations Cup third place: 2017

Individual

- PFA Team of the Year: 2010–11 League One
- Southampton Player of the Season: 2010–11, 2014–15
- Lille Player of the Season: 2020–21

Orders

- Commander of the Order of Merit
