= 2021–22 Paris Saint-Germain FC season =

52nd season in existence of Paris Saint-Germain

Paris Saint-Germain
2021–22 season
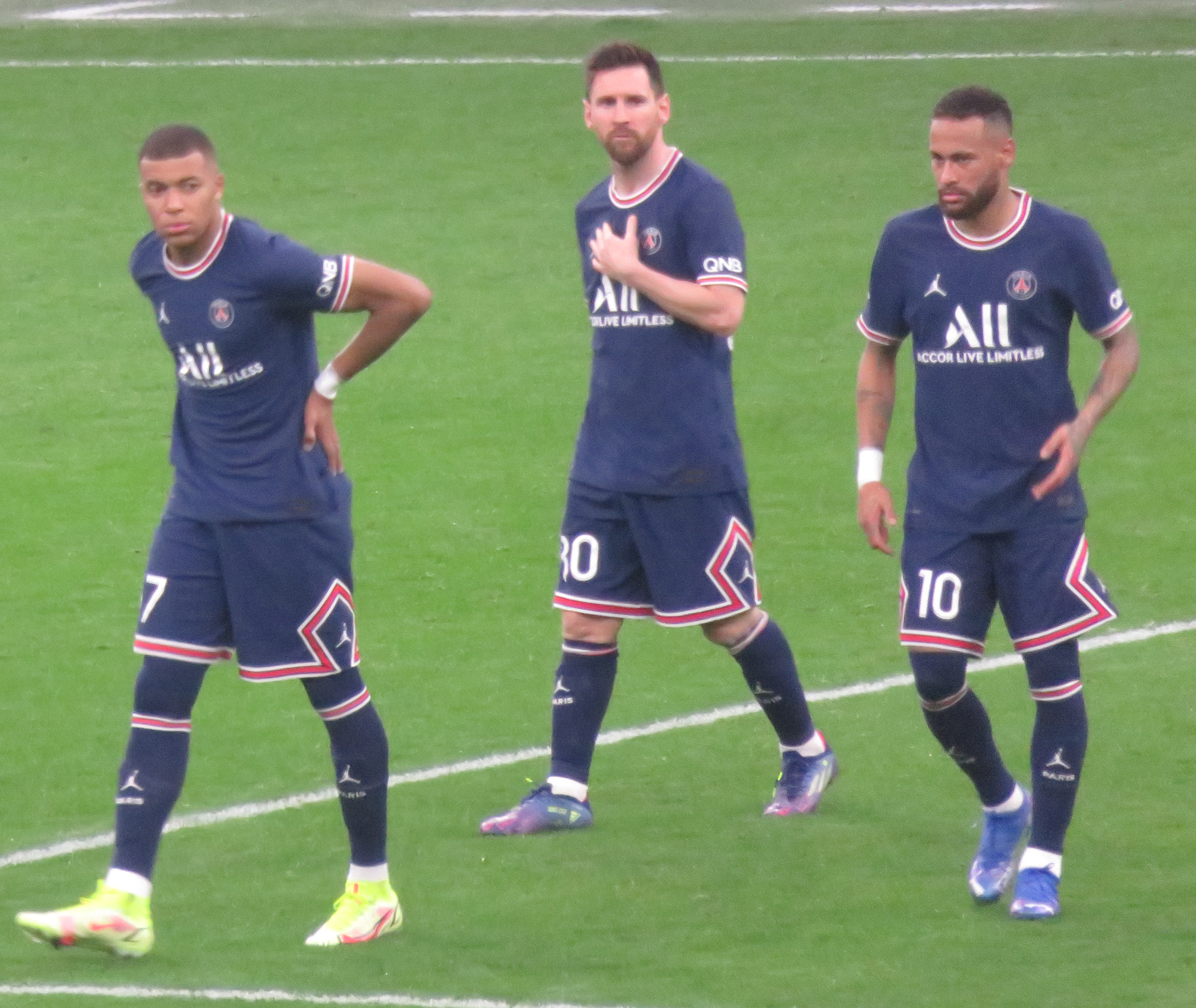
- Kylian Mbappé, Lionel Messi, and Neymar re-enter the field following half-time against Marseille, October 2021
- President: Nasser Al-Khelaifi
- Head coach: Mauricio Pochettino
- Stadium: Parc des Princes
- Ligue 1: 1st
- Coupe de France: Round of 16
- Trophée des Champions: Runners-up
- UEFA Champions League: Round of 16
- Top goalscorer: League: Kylian Mbappé (28); All: Kylian Mbappé (39)
- Biggest win: 6–1 v Clermont, Ligue 1, 9 April 2022; 5–0 v Metz, Ligue 1, 21 May 2022
- Biggest defeat: 0–3 v Monaco, Ligue 1, 20 March 2022
Home colours	Away colours	Third colours

The 2021–22 season was the 52nd season in the existence of Paris Saint-Germain F.C. and the club's 48th consecutive season in the top flight of French football. In addition to the domestic league, Paris Saint-Germain participated in this season's editions of the Coupe de France and the UEFA Champions League, having lost the Trophée des Champions for the first time in nine years.

Before the season proper, PSG were widely characterized as a dream team, as they acquired the 2021 Ballon d'Or winner Lionel Messi, the 2021 Yashin Trophy winner Gianluigi Donnarumma, Ballon d'Or Dream Teamer Sergio Ramos, and the Netherlands vice-captain Georginio Wijnaldum, while spending close to €100 million on other transfers (such as Moroccan international Achraf Hakimi) and turning down an offer north of €200 million for Kylian Mbappé, in the summer transfer window. PSG would go on to win the Ligue 1 title back, but were eliminated from the Coupe de France by Nice in the round of 16. They suffered an exit at the same stage of the Champions League to Real Madrid, surrendering a 1–0 first-leg lead to lose 3–2 on aggregate.

== Kits ==
Home	Away	Away alt.	Third	Fourth	Fourth alt.	Fourth alt. 2

== Players ==
As of 18 May 2022.

=== First-team squad ===
Note: Flags indicate national team as defined under FIFA eligibility rules; some limited exceptions apply. Players may hold more than one non-FIFA nationality.

No.	Pos.	Nation	Player
1	GK	CRC	Keylor Navas
2	DF	MAR	Achraf Hakimi
3	DF	FRA	Presnel Kimpembe (vice-captain)
4	DF	ESP	Sergio Ramos
5	DF	BRA	Marquinhos (captain)
6	MF	ITA	Marco Verratti
7	FW	FRA	Kylian Mbappé
8	MF	ARG	Leandro Paredes
9	FW	ARG	Mauro Icardi
10	FW	BRA	Neymar
11	MF	ARG	Ángel Di María
14	DF	ESP	Juan Bernat
15	MF	POR	Danilo Pereira
17	DF	FRA	Colin Dagba
18	MF	NED	Georginio Wijnaldum
20	DF	FRA	Layvin Kurzawa

No.	Pos.	Nation	Player
21	MF	ESP	Ander Herrera
22	DF	SEN	Abdou Diallo
23	MF	GER	Julian Draxler
24	DF	GER	Thilo Kehrer
25	DF	POR	Nuno Mendes (on loan from Sporting CP)
27	MF	SEN	Idrissa Gueye
28	MF	FRA	Éric Junior Dina Ebimbe
30	FW	ARG	Lionel Messi
31	DF	FRA	El Chadaille Bitshiabu
34	MF	NED	Xavi Simons
35	MF	FRA	Ismaël Gharbi
38	MF	FRA	Edouard Michut
39	MF	FRA	Nathan Bitumazala
40	GK	ITA	Denis Franchi
50	GK	ITA	Gianluigi Donnarumma
60	GK	FRA	Alexandre Letellier

=== Out on loan ===
Note: Flags indicate national team as defined under FIFA eligibility rules; some limited exceptions apply. Players may hold more than one non-FIFA nationality.

No.	Pos.	Nation	Player
—	GK	FRA	Alphonse Areola (at West Ham United until 30 June 2022)
—	GK	POL	Marcin Bułka (at Nice until 30 June 2022)
—	GK	ESP	Sergio Rico (at Mallorca until 30 June 2022)
—	DF	FRA	Teddy Alloh (at Eupen until 30 June 2022)
—	DF	FRA	Thierno Baldé (at Le Havre until 30 June 2022)

No.	Pos.	Nation	Player
—	DF	FRA	Timothée Pembélé (at Bordeaux until 30 June 2022)
—	MF	BRA	Rafinha (at Real Sociedad until 30 June 2022)
—	MF	ESP	Pablo Sarabia (at Sporting CP until 30 June 2022)
—	FW	FRA	Kenny Nagera (at Avranches until 30 June 2022)
—	FW	FRA	Arnaud Kalimuendo (at Lens until 30 June 2022)

=== Other players under contract ===
Note: Flags indicate national team as defined under FIFA eligibility rules; some limited exceptions apply. Players may hold more than one non-FIFA nationality.

No.	Pos.	Nation	Player
—	GK	FRA	Garissone Innocent
—	MF	COM	Anfane Ahamada
—	MF	ALG	Massinissa Oufella

No.	Pos.	Nation	Player
—	MF	FRA	Tidjany Touré
—	FW	FRA	Alexandre Fressange

== Transfers ==
=== In ===
No.	Pos	Player	Transferred from	Fee	Date	Source
15	MF	(Portugal) Danilo Pereira	(Portugal) Porto	€16 million	9 June 2021	
18	MF	(Netherlands) Georginio Wijnaldum	(England) Liverpool	Free	1 July 2021	
2	DF	(Morocco) Achraf Hakimi	(Italy) Inter Milan	€60 million (Note: Up to €11 million in bonuses)	6 July 2021	
4	DF	(Spain) Sergio Ramos	Unattached	Free	8 July 2021	
50	GK	(Italy) Gianluigi Donnarumma	Unattached	Free	14 July 2021	
30	FW	(Argentina) Lionel Messi	Unattached	Free	10 August 2021	
25	DF	(Portugal) Nuno Mendes	(Portugal) Sporting CP	Loan (Note: €7 million loan fee with an option to sign permanently for €38 million.)	31 August 2021	

=== Out ===
Pos	Player	Transferred to	Fee	Date	Source
MF	(France) Maxen Kapo	(Switzerland) Lausanne-Sport	Undisclosed	17 June 2021	
DF	(Ghana) Isaac Hemans Arday	Released	Free	1 July 2021	
DF	(Belgium) Richard Makutungu	Released	Free	1 July 2021	
MF	(France) Kays Ruiz-Atil	Released (Note: On 12 July 2021, Ruiz-Atil joined Barcelona B.)	Free	1 July 2021	
GK	(Algeria) Yanis Saidani	Released	Free	1 July 2021	
MF	(France) Hussayn Touati	Released	Free	1 July 2021	
DF	(Italy) Alessandro Florenzi	(Italy) Roma	Loan return	1 July 2021	
FW	(Italy) Moise Kean	(England) Everton	Loan return	1 July 2021	
DF	(Netherlands) Mitchel Bakker	(Germany) Bayer Leverkusen	€7 million (Note: Up to €3 million in bonuses)	12 July 2021	
DF	(France) Thierno Baldé	(France) Le Havre	Loan	13 July 2021	
GK	(France) Garissone Innocent	(France) Vannes	Loan	26 July 2021	
GK	(France) Alphonse Areola	(England) West Ham United	Loan (Note: Included an option to sign permanently.)	29 July 2021	
FW	(France) Kenny Nagera	(France) Bastia	Loan	3 August 2021	
GK	(Poland) Marcin Bułka	(France) Nice	Loan	5 August 2021	
DF	(France) Timothée Pembélé	(France) Bordeaux	Loan	10 August 2021	
DF	(France) Jonathan Mutombo	(Portugal) Vitória de Guimarães	Undisclosed	31 August 2021	
FW	(France) Arnaud Kalimuendo	(France) Lens	Loan	31 August 2021	
MF	(Spain) Pablo Sarabia	(Portugal) Sporting CP	Loan	31 August 2021	
MF	(Brazil) Rafinha	(Spain) Real Sociedad	Loan	1 January 2022	
MF	(France) Bandiougou Fadiga	(Greece) Olympiacos	Free	14 January 2022	
FW	(France) Kenny Nagera	(France) Avranches	Loan	17 January 2022	
DF	(France) Teddy Alloh	(Belgium) Eupen	Loan	20 January 2022	
GK	(Spain) Sergio Rico	(Spain) Mallorca	Loan	21 January 2022	

== Pre-season and friendlies ==
Win Draw Loss Fixtures

14 July 2021 Friendly	Paris Saint-Germain	4–0	Le Mans	Saint-Germain-en-Laye, France
11:00 CEST (UTC+2)	Icardi 12'; Gharbi 35'; Fadiga 87'; Simons 90+1'	Report		Stadium: Camp des Loges; Attendance: 0 Referee: Jérémie Pignard

17 July 2021 Friendly	Paris Saint-Germain	2–2	Chambly	Saint-Germain-en-Laye, France
11:00 CEST (UTC+2)	Icardi 19' (pen.); Simons 64'	Report	Heinry 57'; Doucouré 89'	Stadium: Camp des Loges; Attendance: 0

21 July 2021 Friendly	Paris Saint-Germain	2–1	FC Augsburg	Orléans, France
19:00 CEST (UTC+2)	Kehrer (yellow card) 55'; Draxler 62'; Gouweleeuw 90+1' (o.g.)	Report	Dorsch (yellow card) 37'; Niederlechner 66'	Stadium: Stade de la Source; Referee: Mikael Lesage

24 July 2021 Friendly	Paris Saint-Germain	1–0	Orléans	Orléans, France
19:00 CEST (UTC+2)	Hakimi 62'	Report		Stadium: Stade de la Source; Referee: Thomas Leonard

27 July 2021 Friendly	Sevilla	2–2	Paris Saint-Germain	Faro, Portugal
20:00 CEST (UTC+2)	Rakitić 40' (pen.); Óscar 62'	Report	Navas (yellow card) 37'; Gharbi (yellow card) 43'; Icardi 48'; Diallo (yellow card) 86'; Nagera 88'	Stadium: Estádio Algarve; Referee: João Malheiro Pinto

19 January 2022 2022 Riyadh Season Cup	Al-Hilal/Al-Nassr stars	Cancelled	Paris Saint-Germain	Riyadh, Saudi Arabia
--:-- SAST (UTC+3)
Note: Postponed to the following season.

== Competitions ==
=== Overall record ===
Competition	First match	Last match	Starting round	Final position	Record							
Competition	First match	Last match	Starting round	Final position	Pld	W	D	L	GF	GA	GD	Win %
Ligue 1	7 August 2021	21 May 2022	Matchday 1	Winners	38	26	8	4	90	36	+54	68.42
Coupe de France	19 December 2021	31 January 2022	Round of 64	Round of 16	3	2	1	0	7	0	+7	66.67
Trophée des Champions	1 August 2021		Final	Runners-up	1	0	0	1	0	1	−1	0.00
UEFA Champions League	15 September 2021	9 March 2022	Group stage	Round of 16	8	4	2	2	15	11	+4	50.00
Total					50	32	11	7	112	48	+64	64.00

Source: Soccerway

=== Ligue 1 ===
==== League table ====
Pos	Team	Pld	W	D	L	GF	GA	GD	Pts	Qualification or relegation
1	Paris Saint-Germain (C)	38	26	8	4	90	36	+54	86	Qualification for the Champions League group stage
2	Marseille	38	21	8	9	63	38	+25	71	Qualification for the Champions League group stage
3	Monaco	38	20	9	9	65	40	+25	69	Qualification for the Champions League third qualifying round
4	Rennes	38	20	6	12	82	40	+42	66	Qualification for the Europa League group stage
5	Nice	38	20	7	11	52	36	+16	66 (Note: Nice were deducted one point for uncontrolled crowd trouble that caused the abandonment of their match against Marseille.)	Qualification for the Europa Conference League play-off round

Source: Ligue 1
Rules for classification: 1) Points; 2) Goal difference; 3) Head-to-head points; 4) Head-to-head goal difference; 5) Head-to-head goals scored; 6) Head-to-head away goals scored; 7) Goals scored; 8) Away goals scored; 9) Fair-play points (Note: Head-to-head record is used only after all the matches between the teams in question have been played).
(C) Champions

==== Results summary ====
Overall								Home						Away					
Pld	W	D	L	GF	GA	GD	Pts	W	D	L	GF	GA	GD	W	D	L	GF	GA	GD
38	26	8	4	90	36	+54	86	16	3	0	49	12	+37	10	5	4	41	24	+17

Source: Ligue 1

==== Results by round ====
Round	1	2	3	4	5	6	7	8	9	10	11	12	13	14	15	16	17	18	19	20	21	22	23	24	25	26	27	28	29	30	31	32	33	34	35	36	37	38
Ground	A	H	A	A	H	H	A	H	A	H	A	H	A	H	A	H	A	H	A	A	H	H	A	H	A	H	A	H	A	H	A	H	A	H	A	H	A	H
Result	W	W	W	W	W	W	W	W	L	W	D	W	W	W	W	D	D	W	D	D	W	W	W	W	L	W	L	W	L	W	W	W	W	D	D	D	W	W
Position	4	3	1	1	1	1	1	1	1	1	1	1	1	1	1	1	1	1	1	1	1	1	1	1	1	1	1	1	1	1	1	1	1	1	1	1	1	1

Source: Ligue 1
A = Away; H = Home; W = Win; D = Draw; L = Loss

==== Matches ====
The league fixtures were announced on 25 June 2021.

7 August 2021 1	Troyes	1–2	Paris Saint-Germain	Troyes
21:00 CEST (UTC+2)	El Hajjam 9'; Koné (yellow card) 90'	Report	Hakimi 19', (yellow card) 45'; Icardi 21', (yellow card) 70'; Kimpembe (yellow card) 33'; Sarabia (yellow card) 90+2'	Stadium: Stade de l'Aube; Attendance: 15,248; Referee: Amaury Delerue

14 August 2021 2	Paris Saint-Germain	4–2	Strasbourg	Paris
21:00 CEST (UTC+2)	Icardi 3'; Ajorque 25' (o.g.); Draxler 27'; Dina Ebimbe (yellow card) 51'; Sarabia 86'	Report	Gameiro 53'; Fila (yellow card) 60'; Ajorque 64'; Djiku (yellow card) 80' (yellow-red card) 81'; Bellegarde (yellow card) 90+3'	Stadium: Parc des Princes; Attendance: 46,962; Referee: Willy Delajod

20 August 2021 3	Brest	2–4	Paris Saint-Germain	Brest
21:00 CEST (UTC+2)	Honorat 42'; Brassier (yellow card) 52'; Mounié 85'	Report	Herrera 23'; Mbappé 36', (yellow card) 65'; Verratti (yellow card) 54'; Gueye 73'; Di María 90'	Stadium: Stade Francis-Le Blé; Attendance: 14,586; Referee: Eric Wattellier

29 August 2021 4	Reims	0–2	Paris Saint-Germain	Reims
20:45 CEST (UTC+2)	Ekitike (yellow card) 84'	Report	Mbappé 16', 64'; Verratti (yellow card) 45'; Diallo (yellow card) 55'; Paredes (yellow card) 88'	Stadium: Stade Auguste-Delaune; Attendance: 20,525; Referee: François Letexier

11 September 2021 5	Paris Saint-Germain	4–0	Clermont	Paris
17:00 CEST (UTC+2)	Herrera 20', 31'; Mbappé 55'; Gueye 65'	Report	Zedadka (yellow card) 10'	Stadium: Parc des Princes; Attendance: 47,329; Referee: Mikael Lesage

19 September 2021 6	Paris Saint-Germain	2–1	Lyon	Paris
20:45 CEST (UTC+2)	Di María (yellow card) 6'; Neymar 66' (pen.); Marquinhos (yellow card) 67'; Mendes (yellow card) 89'; Icardi 90+2'	Report	Paquetá 54'; Lopes (yellow card) 80'	Stadium: Parc des Princes; Attendance: 47,611; Referee: Clément Turpin

22 September 2021 7	Metz	1–2	Paris Saint-Germain	Metz
21:00 CEST (UTC+2)	Yade (yellow card) 19'; Kouyaté 39'; Maïga (yellow card) 69'; Bronn (yellow card) 73' (yellow-red card) 90+1'; Centonze (yellow card) 90+1'; Oukidja (yellow card) 90+6'	Report	Hakimi 5', 90+4'; Mendes (yellow card) 70'; Neymar (yellow card) 90+6'	Stadium: Stade Saint-Symphorien; Attendance: 26,661; Referee: Jérémie Pignard

25 September 2021 8	Paris Saint-Germain	2–0	Montpellier	Paris
21:00 CEST (UTC+2)	Gueye 14'; Draxler 88'	Report	Makouana (yellow card) 90+1'	Stadium: Parc des Princes; Attendance: 47,408; Referee: Antony Gautier

3 October 2021 9	Rennes	2–0	Paris Saint-Germain	Rennes
13:00 CEST (UTC+2)	Laborde (yellow card) 24', (goal) 45'; Tait 46'; Martin (yellow card) 55'	Report	Kimpembe (yellow card) 55'; Donnarumma (yellow card) 56'; Mbappé (yellow card) 86'	Stadium: Roazhon Park; Attendance: 28,092; Referee: Ruddy Buquet

15 October 2021 10	Paris Saint-Germain	2–1	Angers	Paris
21:00 CEST (UTC+2)	Pereira 68'; Mbappé 87' (pen.); Verratti (yellow card) 90+3'	Report	Fulgini 35'; Capelle (yellow card) 86'	Stadium: Parc des Princes; Attendance: 47,646; Referee: Bastien Dechepy

24 October 2021 11	Marseille	0–0	Paris Saint-Germain	Marseille
20:45 CEST (UTC+2)	Rongier (yellow card) 18'	Report	Hakimi (red card) 57'; Pereira (yellow card) 85'; Marquinhos (yellow card) 85'	Stadium: Stade Vélodrome; Attendance: 65,121; Referee: Benoît Bastien

29 October 2021 12	Paris Saint-Germain	2–1	Lille	Paris
21:00 CEST (UTC+2)	Marquinhos 74'; Neymar (yellow card) 86'; Di María 88'	Report	Mandava (yellow card) 5'; David 31'; Yılmaz (yellow card) 36'; Sanches (yellow card) 57'; Çelik (yellow card) 63'; Grbić (yellow card) 85'	Stadium: Parc des Princes; Attendance: 47,874; Referee: Amaury Delerue

6 November 2021 13	Bordeaux	2–3	Paris Saint-Germain	Bordeaux
21:00 CET (UTC+1)	Pembélé (yellow card) 28'; Elis 79'; Niang (yellow card) 88', (goal) 90+2'	Report	Neymar 26', 43'; Mbappé 63', (yellow card) 74'	Stadium: Matmut Atlantique; Attendance: 41,172; Referee: Ruddy Buquet

20 November 2021 14	Paris Saint-Germain	3–1	Nantes	Paris
17:00 CET (UTC+1)	Mbappé 2'; Navas (red card) 65'; Verratti (yellow card) 71'; Appiah 82' (o.g.); Messi 87'	Report	Chirivella (yellow card) 39'; Kolo Muani 76'; Blas (yellow card) 83'	Stadium: Parc des Princes; Attendance: 47,777; Referee: Jérémy Stinat

28 November 2021 15	Saint-Étienne	1–3	Paris Saint-Germain	Saint-Étienne
13:00 CET (UTC+1)	Sissoko (yellow card) 18'; Bouanga 25'; Boudebouz (yellow card) 32'; Camara (yellow card) 36'; Kolodziejczak (red card) 45'	Report	Bernat (yellow card) 33'; Marquinhos 45+2', 90+1'; Di María 79'	Stadium: Stade Geoffroy-Guichard; Attendance: 24,586; Referee: Jérôme Brisard

1 December 2021 16	Paris Saint-Germain	0–0	Nice	Paris
21:00 CET (UTC+1)	Pereira (yellow card) 31'	Report	Kluivert (yellow card) 66'; Boudaoui (yellow card) 76'; Bard (yellow card) 88'	Stadium: Parc des Princes; Attendance: 47,502; Referee: Clément Turpin

4 December 2021 17	Lens	1–1	Paris Saint-Germain	Lens
21:00 CET (UTC+1)	Medina (yellow card) 47'; Fofana 62'; Gradit (yellow card) 90+2'	Report	Verratti (yellow card) 63'; Hakimi (yellow card) 90'; Wijnaldum 90+1'	Stadium: Stade Bollaert-Delelis; Attendance: 36,685; Referee: François Letexier

12 December 2021 18	Paris Saint-Germain	2–0	Monaco	Paris
20:45 CET (UTC+1)	Mbappé 12' (pen.), 45', (yellow card) 18'; Gueye (yellow card) 73'; Verratti (yellow card) 88'	Report	Sidibé (yellow card) 10'; Fofana (yellow card) 16'; Maripán (yellow card) 62'; Martins (yellow card) 72'	Stadium: Parc des Princes; Attendance: 41,154; Referee: Benoît Bastien

22 December 2021 19	Lorient	1–1	Paris Saint-Germain	Lorient
21:00 CET (UTC+1)	Monconduit 40'; Ouattara (yellow card) 43'	Report	Ramos (yellow card) 81' (yellow-red card) 86'; Wijnaldum (yellow card) 85'; Icardi 90+1'	Stadium: Stade du Moustoir; Attendance: 16,603; Referee: Jérémie Pignard

9 January 2022 20	Lyon	1–1	Paris Saint-Germain	Décines-Charpieu
20:45 CET (UTC+1)	Paquetá 9'; Emerson (yellow card) 84'; Boateng (yellow card) 90'	Report	Verratti (yellow card) 43'; Dagba (yellow card) 59'; Kehrer 76'	Stadium: Groupama Stadium; Attendance: 4,977; Referee: François Letexier

15 January 2022 21	Paris Saint-Germain	2–0	Brest	Paris
21:00 CET (UTC+1)	Herrera (yellow card) 24'; Mbappé 32', (yellow card) 34'; Kehrer 53'; Kimpembe (yellow card) 55'; Verratti (yellow card) 58'; Pereira (yellow card) 65'	Report	Magnetti (yellow card) 34'; Agoumé (yellow card) 45+1'; Chardonnet (yellow card) 61'	Stadium: Parc des Princes; Attendance: 4,925; Referee: Mikael Lesage

23 January 2022 22	Paris Saint-Germain	4–0	Reims	Paris
20:45 CET (UTC+1)	Verratti 44', 67'; Ramos 62'; Pereira 75'	Report	Lopy (yellow card) 56'	Stadium: Parc des Princes; Attendance: 5,000; Referee: Eric Wattellier

6 February 2022 23	Lille	1–5	Paris Saint-Germain	Villeneuve-d'Ascq
20:45 CET (UTC+1)	Botman 28'; Çelik (yellow card) 75'; Bradarić (yellow card) 83'	Report	Pereira 10', 51'; Kimpembe 32'; Messi 38'; Paredes (yellow card) 45+1'; Mbappé 67'	Stadium: Stade Pierre-Mauroy; Attendance: 48,437; Referee: François Letexier

11 February 2022 24	Paris Saint-Germain	1–0	Rennes	Paris
21:00 CET (UTC+1)	Mbappé (yellow card) 41', (goal) 90+3'; Verratti (yellow card) 89'	Report	Alemdar (yellow card) 90'	Stadium: Parc des Princes; Attendance: 47,000; Referee: Benoît Bastien

19 February 2022 25	Nantes	3–1	Paris Saint-Germain	Nantes
21:00 CET (UTC+1)	Kolo Muani 4'; Merlin 16'; Castelletto (yellow card) 18'; Appiah (yellow card) 45+1'; Blas 45+5' (pen.)	Report	Verratti (yellow card) 38'; Wijnaldum (yellow card) 45+4'; Neymar 47', (yellow card) 50', (penalty missed) 59'; Mbappé (yellow card) 83'; Hakimi (yellow card) 90+1'; Di María (yellow card) 90+3'	Stadium: Stade de la Beaujoire; Attendance: 35,500; Referee: Mikael Lesage

26 February 2022 26	Paris Saint-Germain	3–1	Saint-Étienne	Paris
21:00 CET (UTC+1)	Mbappé 42', 47'; Pereira 52'; Gueye (yellow card) 56'; Marquinhos (yellow card) 90'	Report	Mangala (yellow card) 9'; Bouanga 16'	Stadium: Parc des Princes; Attendance: 45,000; Referee: Pierre Gaillouste

5 March 2022 27	Nice	1–0	Paris Saint-Germain	Nice
21:00 CET (UTC+1)	Lemina (yellow card) 33'; Delort 88'	Report		Stadium: Allianz Riviera; Attendance: 31,949; Referee: Willy Delajod

13 March 2022 28	Paris Saint-Germain	3–0	Bordeaux	Paris
13:00 CET (UTC+1)	Mbappé 24'; Paredes (yellow card) 39', (goal) 61'; Neymar 52'	Report	Guilavogui (yellow card) 40'; Oudin (yellow card) 45+1'	Stadium: Parc des Princes; Attendance: 44,000; Referee: François Letexier

20 March 2022 29	Monaco	3–0	Paris Saint-Germain	Monaco
13:00 CET (UTC+1)	Ben Yedder 25', 84' (pen.); Martins (yellow card) 30'; Volland (yellow card) 65', (goal) 68'; Tchouaméni (yellow card) 74'	Report	Mbappé (yellow card) 52'; Neymar (yellow card) 53'; Kimpembe (yellow card) 82'	Stadium: Stade Louis II; Attendance: 16,642; Referee: Benoît Bastien

3 April 2022 30	Paris Saint-Germain	5–1	Lorient	Paris
20:45 CEST (UTC+2)	Neymar 12', 90'; Mbappé 28', 67'; Gueye (yellow card) 53'; Kimpembe (yellow card) 57'; Messi 73'	Report	Koné (yellow card) 38'; Moffi 56'	Stadium: Parc des Princes; Attendance: 40,000; Referee: Hakim Ben El Hadj

9 April 2022 31	Clermont	1–6	Paris Saint-Germain	Clermont-Ferrand
21:00 CEST (UTC+2)	Dossou 42'; Gastien (yellow card) 70'	Report	Neymar 6', 71' (pen.), 83', (yellow card) 53'; Mbappé 19', 74', 80'	Stadium: Stade Gabriel Montpied; Attendance: 12,664; Referee: Eric Wattellier

17 April 2022 32	Paris Saint-Germain	2–1	Marseille	Paris
20:45 CEST (UTC+2)	Neymar 12', (yellow card) 55'; Verratti (yellow card) 17'; Mendes (yellow card) 37'; Mbappé 45+4' (pen.), (yellow card) 90+1'; Gueye (yellow card) 46'; Donnarumma (yellow card) 90+2'	Report	Gerson (yellow card) 21'; Ćaleta-Car 31'	Stadium: Parc des Princes; Attendance: 46,000; Referee: François Letexier

20 April 2022 33	Angers	0–3	Paris Saint-Germain	Angers
21:00 CEST (UTC+2)	Doumbia (yellow card) 88'	Report	Mbappé 28'; Bernat (yellow card) 42'; Ramos 45+1'; Dina Ebimbe (yellow card) 50'; Marquinhos 77'; Michut (red card) 90+1'	Stadium: Stade Raymond Kopa; Attendance: 12,829; Referee: Johan Hamel

23 April 2022 34	Paris Saint-Germain	1–1	Lens	Paris
21:00 CEST (UTC+2)	Ramos (yellow card) 54'; Messi 68'; Verratti (yellow card) 73'; Marquinhos (yellow card) 78'; Neymar (yellow card) 90'	Report	Danso (yellow card) 9' (yellow-red card) 57'; Jean 88'	Stadium: Parc des Princes; Attendance: 47,000; Referee: Amaury Delerue

29 April 2022 35	Strasbourg	3–3	Paris Saint-Germain	Strasbourg
21:00 CEST (UTC+2)	Gameiro 3'; Bellegarde (yellow card) 8'; Prcić (yellow card) 41'; Liénard (yellow card) 60'; Verratti 75' (o.g.); Caci 90+1'	Report	Mbappé 23', 68'; Hakimi 64'; Neymar (yellow card) 73'; Kimpembe (yellow card) 90+2'; Donnarumma (yellow card) 90+5'	Stadium: Stade de la Meinau; Attendance: 26,052; Referee: Ruddy Buquet

8 May 2022 36	Paris Saint-Germain	2–2	Troyes	Paris
20:45 CEST (UTC+2)	Marquinhos 6'; Neymar 25' (pen.), (yellow card) 66'	Report	Ugbo 30'; Tardieu 49' (pen.); Ripart (yellow card) 66'; Kouamé (yellow card) 82'	Stadium: Parc des Princes; Attendance: 47,854; Referee: Jérôme Brisard

14 May 2022 37	Montpellier	0–4	Paris Saint-Germain	Montpellier
21:00 CEST (UTC+2)	Souquet (yellow card) 41'; Ferri (yellow card) 89'	Report	Messi 6', 20'; Di María 26'; Herrera (yellow card) 34'; Mbappé 60' (pen.), (yellow card) 85'; Simons (yellow card) 70'; Marquinhos (yellow card) 90+2'	Stadium: Stade de la Mosson; Attendance: 19,586; Referee: Jérémy Stinat

21 May 2022 38	Paris Saint-Germain	5–0	Metz	Paris
21:00 CEST (UTC+2)	Mbappé 25', 28', 50'; Neymar 31', (yellow card) 72'; Di María 67'	Report	Traoré (yellow card) 23' (yellow-red card) 58'	Stadium: Parc des Princes; Attendance: 47,926; Referee: Antony Gautier

=== Coupe de France ===
19 December 2021 Round of 64	Feignies Aulnoye	0–3	Paris Saint-Germain	Valenciennes
21:10 CET (UTC+1)		Report	Mbappé 16' (pen.), 51'; Icardi 31' (pen.)	Stadium: Stade du Hainaut; Attendance: 25,000; Referee: Florent Batta

3 January 2022 Round of 32	Vannes OC	0–4	Paris Saint-Germain	Vannes
21:10 CET (UTC+1)	Yobé (yellow card) 36'	Report	Kimpembe 28', (yellow card) 46'; Herrera (yellow card) 57'; Mbappé 59', 71', 76'	Stadium: Stade de la Rabine; Attendance: 5,000; Referee: Jérémy Stinat

31 January 2022 Round of 16	Paris Saint-Germain	0–0 (5–6 p)	Nice	Paris
21:15 CET (UTC+1)	Pereira (yellow card) 24'; Kehrer (yellow card) 55'; Dagba (yellow card) 72'	Report	Gouiri (yellow card) 29'; Boudaoui (yellow card) 61'; Schneiderlin (yellow card) 76'; Todibo (yellow card) 78'; Atal (yellow card) 79'	Stadium: Parc des Princes; Attendance: 5,000; Referee: Jérémie Pignard
	Penalties
	Messi (penalty scored); Mbappé (penalty scored); Paredes (penalty missed); Draxler (penalty scored); Verratti (penalty scored); Bernat (penalty scored); Simons (penalty missed)		(penalty scored) Schneiderlin; (penalty scored) Todibo; (penalty scored) Atal; (penalty missed) Delort; (penalty scored) Gouiri; (penalty scored) Guessand; (penalty scored) Dante

=== Trophée des Champions ===
1 August 2021 Final	Lille	1–0	Paris Saint-Germain	Tel Aviv
21:00 CEST (UTC+2)	Xeka 45'; Luiz Araújo (yellow card) 78'; Jardim (yellow card) 90+2'	Report	Kehrer (yellow card) 30'; Diallo (yellow card) 52'; Draxler (yellow card) 85'; Pereira (yellow card) 90+4'	Stadium: Bloomfield Stadium; Attendance: 29,000; Referee: Yigal Frid (Israel)

=== UEFA Champions League ===
==== Group stage ====
The draw for the group stage was held on 26 August 2021.

Pos	Team	Pld	W	D	L	GF	GA	GD	Pts	Qualification	MCI	PAR	RBL	BRU
1	(England) Manchester City	6	4	0	2	18	10	+8	12	Advance to knockout phase	—	2–1	6–3	4–1
2	(France) Paris Saint-Germain	6	3	2	1	13	8	+5	11	Advance to knockout phase	2–0	—	3–2	4–1
3	(Germany) RB Leipzig	6	2	1	3	15	14	+1	7	Transfer to Europa League	2–1	2–2	—	1–2
4	(Belgium) Club Brugge	6	1	1	4	6	20	−14	4		1–5	1–1	0–5	—

Source: UEFA
Rules for classification: Group stage tiebreakers

15 September 2021 1	Club Brugge (Belgium)	1–1	(France) Paris Saint-Germain	Bruges, Belgium
21:00 CEST (UTC+1)	Vanaken 27'; Lang (yellow card) 62'; Balanta (yellow card) 76'	Report	Paredes (yellow card) 12'; Herrera 15'; Messi (yellow card) 72'	Stadium: Jan Breydel Stadium; Attendance: 27,546; Referee: Sandro Schärer (Switzerland)

28 September 2021 2	Paris Saint-Germain (France)	2–0	(England) Manchester City	Paris, France
21:00 CEST (UTC+2)	Gueye 8'; Messi 74'; Verratti (yellow card) 77'	Report	Cancelo (yellow card) 24'; De Bruyne (yellow card) 39'	Stadium: Parc des Princes; Attendance: 37,350; Referee: Carlos del Cerro Grande (Spain)

19 October 2021 3	Paris Saint-Germain (France)	3–2	(Germany) RB Leipzig	Paris, France
21:00 CEST (UTC+2)	Mbappé 9', (penalty missed) 90+4'; Gueye (yellow card) 48'; Hakimi (yellow card) 64'; Messi 67', 74' (pen.)	Report	Orbán (yellow card) 18'; Silva 28'; Simakan (yellow card) 38'; Mukiele 57'; Adams (yellow card) 84'	Stadium: Parc des Princes; Attendance: 47,359; Referee: Marco Guida (Italy)

3 November 2021 4	RB Leipzig (Germany)	2–2	(France) Paris Saint-Germain	Leipzig, Germany
21:00 CET (UTC+1)	Nkunku 8'; Silva (penalty missed) 12'; Adams (yellow card) 25'; Simakan (yellow card) 69'; Szoboszlai 90+2' (pen.); Poulsen (yellow card) 90+5'	Report	Pereira (yellow card) 10'; Wijnaldum 21', 39'; Kimpembe (yellow card) 32'; Mendes (yellow card) 62'; Neymar (yellow card) 74'; Donnarumma (yellow card) 90+1'; Herrera (yellow card) 90+5'	Stadium: Red Bull Arena; Attendance: 39,794; Referee: Andreas Ekberg (Sweden)

24 November 2021 5	Manchester City (England)	2–1	(France) Paris Saint-Germain	Manchester, England
20:00 GMT (UTC±0)	Rodri (yellow card) 55'; Sterling 63'; Gabriel Jesus 76', (yellow card) 90+3'; Cancelo (yellow card) 80'	Report	Mbappé 50'	Stadium: City of Manchester Stadium; Attendance: 52,030; Referee: Daniele Orsato (Italy)

7 December 2021 6	Paris Saint-Germain (France)	4–1	(Belgium) Club Brugge	Paris, France
18:45 CET (UTC+1)	Mbappé 2', 7', (yellow card) 70'; Messi 38', 76' (pen.); Kehrer (yellow card) 55'	Report	Lang (yellow card) 61'; Rits 68'	Stadium: Parc des Princes; Attendance: 47,492; Referee: Jesús Gil Manzano (Spain)

==== Knockout phase ====
===== Round of 16 =====
The draw for the round of 16 was held on 13 December 2021.

15 February 2022 First leg	Paris Saint-Germain (France)	1–0	(Spain) Real Madrid	Paris, France
21:00 CET (UTC+1)	Verratti (yellow card) 40'; Messi (penalty missed) 61'; Pereira (yellow card) 62'; Kimpembe (yellow card) 83'; Paredes (yellow card) 90'; Mbappé 90+4'	Report	Casemiro (yellow card) 37'; Militão (yellow card) 51'; Mendy (yellow card) 57'; Rodrygo (yellow card) 83'	Stadium: Parc des Princes; Attendance: 47,443; Referee: Daniele Orsato (Italy)

9 March 2022 Second leg	Real Madrid (Spain)	3–1 (3–2 agg.)	(France) Paris Saint-Germain	Madrid, Spain
21:00 CET (UTC+1)	Nacho (yellow card) 43'; Vinícius (yellow card) 43'; Carvajal (yellow card) 60'; Benzema 61', 76', 78'; Vázquez (yellow card) 88'	Report	Paredes (yellow card) 7'; Mbappé 39'; Donnarumma (yellow card) 62'; Hakimi (yellow card) 81'; Kimpembe (yellow card) 83'	Stadium: Santiago Bernabéu; Attendance: 59,895; Referee: Danny Makkelie (Netherlands)

== Statistics ==
=== Appearances and goals ===
No.	Pos	Nat	Player	Total		Ligue 1		Coupe de France		Trophée des Champions		UEFA Champions League	
No.	Pos	Nat	Player	Apps	Goals	Apps	Goals	Apps	Goals	Apps	Goals	Apps	Goals
Goalkeepers
1	GK	(Costa Rica) CRC	Keylor Navas	26	0	21	0	1	0	1	0	3	0
40	GK	(Italy) ITA	Denis Franchi	0	0	0	0	0	0	0	0	0	0
50	GK	(Italy) ITA	Gianluigi Donnarumma	24	0	17	0	2	0	0	0	5	0
60	GK	(France) FRA	Alexandre Letellier	1	0	0+1	0	0	0	0	0	0	0
Defenders
2	DF	(Morocco) MAR	Achraf Hakimi	41	4	28+4	4	0	0	1	0	8	0
3	DF	(France) FRA	Presnel Kimpembe	41	2	29+1	1	3	1	1	0	7	0
4	DF	(Spain) ESP	Sergio Ramos	13	2	8+4	2	1	0	0	0	0	0
5	DF	(Brazil) BRA	Marquinhos	40	5	32	5	0	0	0	0	8	0
14	DF	(Spain) ESP	Juan Bernat	16	0	12+3	0	0+1	0	0	0	0	0
17	DF	(France) FRA	Colin Dagba	6	0	2+1	0	2+1	0	0	0	0	0
20	DF	(France) FRA	Layvin Kurzawa	1	0	0	0	0	0	0+1	0	0	0
22	DF	(Senegal) SEN	Abdou Diallo	16	0	10+2	0	1	0	1	0	2	0
24	DF	(Germany) GER	Thilo Kehrer	34	2	16+11	2	3	0	1	0	0+3	0
25	DF	(Portugal) POR	Nuno Mendes	37	0	18+9	0	2	0	0	0	7+1	0
31	DF	(France) FRA	El Chadaille Bitshiabu	3	0	0+1	0	0+2	0	0	0	0	0
32	DF	(France) FRA	Teddy Alloh	0	0	0	0	0	0	0	0	0	0
Midfielders
6	MF	(Italy) ITA	Marco Verratti	32	2	23+1	2	3	0	0	0	5	0
8	MF	(Argentina) ARG	Leandro Paredes	22	1	10+5	1	1+1	0	0	0	4+1	0
11	MF	(Argentina) ARG	Ángel Di María	31	5	19+7	5	0	0	0	0	3+2	0
15	MF	(Portugal) POR	Danilo Pereira	37	5	22+5	5	1+1	0	1	0	3+4	0
18	MF	(Netherlands) NED	Georginio Wijnaldum	38	3	18+13	1	1	0	0+1	0	3+2	2
21	MF	(Spain) ESP	Ander Herrera	28	4	12+7	3	2	0	1	0	4+2	1
23	MF	(Germany) GER	Julian Draxler	24	2	5+13	2	1	0	1	0	1+3	0
27	MF	(Senegal) SEN	Idrissa Gueye	33	4	18+8	3	0	0	0	0	5+2	1
28	MF	(France) FRA	Éric Junior Dina Ebimbe	14	0	4+6	0	1+1	0	1	0	0+1	0
33	MF	(France) FRA	Djeidi Gassama	1	0	0+1	0	0	0	0	0	0	0
34	MF	(Netherlands) NED	Xavi Simons	9	0	1+5	0	2+1	0	0	0	0	0
35	MF	(France) FRA	Ismaël Gharbi	4	0	0+1	0	0+2	0	0+1	0	0	0
38	MF	(France) FRA	Edouard Michut	7	0	0+5	0	1+1	0	0	0	0	0
39	MF	(France) FRA	Nathan Bitumazala	1	0	0+1	0	0	0	0	0	0	0
Forwards
7	FW	(France) FRA	Kylian Mbappé	46	39	34+1	28	2+1	5	0	0	8	6
9	FW	(Argentina) ARG	Mauro Icardi	30	5	10+14	4	2	1	1	0	0+3	0
10	FW	(Brazil) BRA	Neymar	28	13	22	13	0	0	0	0	5+1	0
30	FW	(Argentina) ARG	Lionel Messi	34	11	24+2	6	1	0	0	0	7	5
33	FW	(France) FRA	Sekou Yansané	1	0	0+1	0	0	0	0	0	0	0
Players transferred out during the season
16	GK	(Spain) ESP	Sergio Rico	1	0	0+1	0	0	0	0	0	0	0
12	MF	(Brazil) BRA	Rafinha	5	0	3+2	0	0	0	0	0	0	0
19	MF	(Spain) ESP	Pablo Sarabia	2	1	0+2	1	0	0	0	0	0	0
29	FW	(France) FRA	Arnaud Kalimuendo	3	0	0+2	0	0	0	1	0	0	0

Source: Competitions

=== Goalscorers ===
Rank	No.	Pos.	Nat.	Player	Ligue 1	Coupe de France	Trophée des Champions	Champions League	Total
1	7	FW	(France)	Kylian Mbappé	28	5	0	6	39
2	10	FW	(Brazil)	Neymar	13	0	0	0	13
3	30	FW	(Argentina)	Lionel Messi	6	0	0	5	11
4	5	DF	(Brazil)	Marquinhos	5	0	0	0	5
4	9	FW	(Argentina)	Mauro Icardi	4	1	0	0	5
4	11	MF	(Argentina)	Ángel Di María	5	0	0	0	5
4	15	MF	(Portugal)	Danilo Pereira	5	0	0	0	5
8	2	DF	(Morocco)	Achraf Hakimi	4	0	0	0	4
8	21	MF	(Spain)	Ander Herrera	3	0	0	1	4
8	27	MF	(Senegal)	Idrissa Gueye	3	0	0	1	4
11	18	MF	(Netherlands)	Georginio Wijnaldum	1	0	0	2	3
12	3	DF	(France)	Presnel Kimpembe	1	1	0	0	2
12	4	DF	(Spain)	Sergio Ramos	2	0	0	0	2
12	6	MF	(Italy)	Marco Verratti	2	0	0	0	2
12	23	MF	(Germany)	Julian Draxler	2	0	0	0	2
12	24	DF	(Germany)	Thilo Kehrer	2	0	0	0	2
17	8	MF	(Argentina)	Leandro Paredes	1	0	0	0	1
17	19	MF	(Spain)	Pablo Sarabia	1	0	0	0	1
Own goals					2	0	0	0	2
Totals					90	7	0	15	112
