= 2021–22 Lille OSC season =

Lille
2021–22 season
- President: Olivier Létang
- Head coach: Jocelyn Gourvennec
- Stadium: Stade Pierre-Mauroy
- Ligue 1: 10th
- Coupe de France: Round of 32
- Trophée des Champions: Winners
- UEFA Champions League: Round of 16
- Top goalscorer: League: Jonathan David (15); All: Jonathan David (19)
- Highest home attendance: 44,839 vs Marseille
- Lowest home attendance: 28,859 vs Montpellier
- Biggest win: Lille 4–0 Clermont
- Biggest defeat: Lille 0–4 Nice; Lille 1–5 Paris Saint-Germain
Home colours	Away colours	Third colours

The 2021–22 season was the 78th season in the existence of Lille OSC and the club's 22nd consecutive season in the top flight of French football. In addition to the domestic league, Lille participated in this season's editions of the Coupe de France, the Trophée des Champions, and the UEFA Champions League.

== Players ==
=== First-team squad ===
As of 19 January 2022

Note: Flags indicate national team as defined under FIFA eligibility rules; some limited exceptions apply. Players may hold more than one non-FIFA nationality.

No.	Pos.	Nation	Player
1	GK	CRO	Ivo Grbić (on loan from Atlético Madrid)
2	DF	TUR	Zeki Çelik
3	DF	POR	Tiago Djaló
4	DF	NED	Sven Botman
5	DF	SWE	Gabriel Gudmundsson
6	DF	POR	José Fonte (captain)
7	FW	FRA	Jonathan Bamba
8	MF	POR	Xeka
9	FW	CAN	Jonathan David
10	MF	POR	Renato Sanches
11	MF	FRA	Hatem Ben Arfa
16	GK	SVK	Adam Jakubech
17	FW	TUR	Burak Yılmaz

No.	Pos.	Nation	Player
19	FW	FRA	Isaac Lihadji
20	MF	ENG	Angel Gomes
21	MF	FRA	Benjamin André (vice-captain)
22	FW	USA	Timothy Weah
23	MF	KOS	Edon Zhegrova
24	MF	BEL	Amadou Onana
26	DF	FRA	Jérémy Pied
27	DF	SEN	Cheikh Niasse
28	DF	MOZ	Reinildo Mandava
29	DF	CRO	Domagoj Bradarić
30	GK	BRA	Léo Jardim
—	MF	BFA	Joffrey Bazie

=== Other players under contract ===
Note: Flags indicate national team as defined under FIFA eligibility rules; some limited exceptions apply. Players may hold more than one non-FIFA nationality.

No.	Pos.	Nation	Player
—	GK	GRE	Orestis Karnezis

=== Out on loan ===
Note: Flags indicate national team as defined under FIFA eligibility rules; some limited exceptions apply. Players may hold more than one non-FIFA nationality.

No.	Pos.	Nation	Player
—	GK	FRA	Lucas Chevalier (on loan at Valenciennes)
—	MF	SEN	Barthélemy Diedhiou (on loan at Trofense)

No.	Pos.	Nation	Player
—	MF	FRA	Darly N'Landu (on loan at Avranches)
—	MF	TUR	Yusuf Yazıcı (on loan at CSKA Moscow)

== Transfers ==
=== In ===
No.	Pos.	Player	Transferred from	Fee	Date	Source
31	MF	(England) Angel Gomes	(Portugal) Boavista	Loan return	30 June 2021	
30	GK	(Brazil) Léo Jardim	(Portugal) Boavista	Loan return	30 June 2021	
24	MF	(Belgium) Amadou Onana	(Germany) Hamburger SV	€8,000,000	5 August 2021	
1	GK	(Croatia) Ivo Grbić	(Spain) Atlético Madrid	Loan	18 August 2021	
5	DF	(Sweden) Gabriel Gudmundsson	(Netherlands) Groningen	€6,000,000	30 August 2021	
23	MF	(Kosovo) Edon Zhegrova	(Switzerland) Basel	€7,000,000	14 January 2022	
11	MF	(France) Hatem Ben Arfa	Free transfer		19 January 2022	

=== Out ===
No.	Pos.	Player	Transferred to	Fee	Date	Source
16	GK	(France) Mike Maignan	(Italy) Milan	€13,000,000	1 July 2021	
24	MF	(France) Boubakary Soumaré	(England) Leicester City	Undisclosed	1 July 2021	
	MF	(Mali) Rominigue Kouamé	(France) Troyes	€3,000,000	1 July 2021	
	DF	(France) Adama Soumaoro	(Italy) Bologna	€2,500,000	1 July 2021	
11	FW	(Brazil) Luiz Araújo	(United States) Atlanta United FC	Undisclosed	6 August 2021	
10	MF	(France) Jonathan Ikoné	(Italy) Fiorentina	€15,000,000	3 January 2022	
11	MF	(Turkey) Yusuf Yazıcı	(Russia) CSKA Moscow	Loan	19 January 2022	
15	MF	(Mexico) Eugenio Pizzuto	(Portugal) Braga	Free	26 January 2022	
28	DF	(Mozambique) Reinildo Mandava	(Spain) Atlético Madrid	Undisclosed	31 January 2022	

== Pre-season and friendlies ==
Win Draw Loss Fixtures

9 July 2021 Friendly	Waasland-Beveren	0–2	Lille	Beveren, Belgium
18:30 CEST (UTC+2)		Report	Mandava 18'; Luiz Araújo 38'	Stadium: Freethiel Stadion

14 July 2021 Friendly	Lille	0–1	Gent	Camphin-en-Pévèle, France
17:00 CEST (UTC+2)	Agouzoul (red card) 59'	Report	Bruno 2'	Stadium: Domaine de Luchin

17 July 2021 Friendly	Kortrijk	1–1	Lille	Kortrijk, Belgium
17:00 CEST (UTC+2)	Chevalier 19'	Report	Djaló (red card) 45'; Xeka (red card) 45'; Yazıcı 84' (pen.)	Stadium: Guldensporenstadion

22 July 2021 Friendly	Benfica	1–0	Lille	Faro, Portugal
20:00 WEST (UTC+1)	Ramos 29'; João Mário (yellow card) 40'; Seferovic (yellow card) 72'	Report	Botman (yellow card) 55'	Stadium: Estádio Algarve; Attendance: 0 Referee: João Gonçalves

25 July 2021 Friendly	Porto	2–0	Lille	Faro, Portugal
19:45 WEST (UTC+1)	Costa 53'; Manafá (yellow card) 72'; Fernando 78', (yellow card) 90'	Report	Djaló (yellow card) 16'; Yılmaz (yellow card) 44'; Sanches (yellow card) 48'; Weah (yellow card) 76'	Stadium: Estádio Algarve; Attendance: 0

== Competitions ==
=== Overall record ===
Competition	First match	Last match	Starting round	Final position	Record							
Competition	First match	Last match	Starting round	Final position	Pld	W	D	L	GF	GA	GD	Win %
Ligue 1	8 August 2021	21 May 2022	Matchday 1	10th	38	14	13	11	48	48	+0	36.84
Coupe de France	18 December 2021	4 January 2022	Round of 64	Round of 32	2	1	1	0	5	3	+2	50.00
Trophée des Champions	1 August 2021		Final	Winners	1	1	0	0	1	0	+1	100.00
UEFA Champions League	14 September 2021	16 March 2022	Group stage	Round of 16	8	3	2	3	8	8	+0	37.50
Total					49	19	16	14	62	59	+3	38.78

Source: Soccerway

=== Ligue 1 ===
==== League table ====
Pos	Team	Pld	W	D	L	GF	GA	GD	Pts	Qualification or relegation
8	Lyon	38	17	11	10	66	51	+15	61 (Note: Lyon were deducted one point for uncontrolled crowd trouble that caused the abandonment of their match against Marseille.)	
9	Nantes	38	15	10	13	55	48	+7	55	Qualification for the Europa League group stage (Note: Nantes qualified for the Europa League group stage as the 2021–22 Coupe de France winners.)
10	Lille	38	14	13	11	48	48	0	55	
11	Brest	38	13	9	16	49	57	−8	48	
12	Reims	38	11	13	14	43	44	−1	46	

Source: Ligue 1
Rules for classification: 1) Points; 2) Goal difference; 3) Head-to-head points; 4) Head-to-head goal difference; 5) Head-to-head goals scored; 6) Head-to-head away goals scored; 7) Goals scored; 8) Away goals scored; 9) Fair-play points (Note: Head-to-head record is used only after all the matches between the teams in question have been played).

==== Results summary ====
Overall								Home						Away					
Pld	W	D	L	GF	GA	GD	Pts	W	D	L	GF	GA	GD	W	D	L	GF	GA	GD
38	14	13	11	48	48	0	55	7	8	4	24	22	+2	7	5	7	24	26	−2

Source: Ligue 1

==== Results by round ====
Round	1	2	3	4	5	6	7	8	9	10	11	12	13	14	15	16	17	18	19	20	21	22	23	24	25	26	27	28	29	30	31	32	33	34	35	36	37	38
Ground	A	H	A	H	A	A	H	A	H	A	H	A	H	A	H	A	H	H	A	H	A	A	H	A	H	A	H	H	A	H	A	H	A	H	A	H	A	H
Result	D	L	D	W	L	L	W	W	W	L	D	L	D	D	D	W	W	D	W	W	D	L	L	W	D	W	W	D	W	D	D	L	L	W	L	L	W	D
Position	5	18	13	10	12	15	14	9	8	11	10	12	12	12	13	12	11	11	8	10	8	11	11	10	11	8	7	6	6	7	7	9	9	9	10	10	10	10

Source: Ligue 1
A = Away; H = Home; W = Win; D = Draw; L = Loss

==== Matches ====
The league fixtures were announced on 25 June 2021.

8 August 2021 1	Metz	3–3	Lille	Metz
17:00 CEST (UTC+2)	Centonze 31', 52'; Udol 41'; Bronn (yellow card) 56'; Kouyaté (red card) 56'	Report	Botman 23'; Ikoné (yellow card) 79', (goal) 81'; Yılmaz (yellow card) 83'; Oukidja 90+7' (o.g.)	Stadium: Stade Saint-Symphorien; Attendance: 15,551; Referee: Eric Wattellier

14 August 2021 2	Lille	0–4	Nice	Villeneuve-d'Ascq
17:00 CEST (UTC+2)	Çelik (yellow card) 35'; André (yellow card) 45+2'; Yazıcı (yellow card) 56'	Report	Dolberg 1', 64'; Boudaoui 5'; Atal (yellow card) 21'; Gouiri 45+3' (pen.)	Stadium: Stade Pierre-Mauroy; Attendance: 30,144; Referee: Jérôme Brisard

21 August 2021 3	Saint-Étienne	1–1	Lille	Saint-Étienne
21:00 CEST (UTC+2)	Khazri (yellow card) 80'; Sow 85'	Report	Djaló (yellow card) 19'; Yılmaz (yellow card) 20', (goal) 38'; Xeka (yellow card) 78'	Stadium: Stade Geoffroy-Guichard; Attendance: 20,673; Referee: Mikael Lesage

29 August 2021 4	Lille	2–1	Montpellier	Villeneuve-d'Ascq
17:00 CEST (UTC+2)	Fonte (yellow card) 25'; André (yellow card) 33'; Xeka (yellow card) 43'; Yazıcı 45+1'; David 56'	Report	Sambia (yellow card) 24' (yellow-red card) 73'; Ferri (yellow card) 25'; Laborde (yellow card) 34', (goal) 45+4'; Savanier (yellow card) 56'; Chotard (yellow card) 59'; Mollet (yellow card) 70'	Stadium: Stade Pierre-Mauroy; Attendance: 28,859; Referee: Amaury Delerue

10 September 2021 5	Lorient	2–1	Lille	Lorient
21:00 CEST (UTC+2)	Laurienté 7'; Abergel (yellow card) 34'; Moffi 87'; Boisgard (yellow card) 90+1'	Report	Yılmaz 25' (pen.); Gomes (yellow card) 44'; Xeka (yellow card) 90+3'	Stadium: Stade du Moustoir; Attendance: 10,271; Referee: Clément Turpin

18 September 2021 6	Lens	1–0	Lille	Lens
17:00 CEST (UTC+2)	Leca (yellow card) 56'; Frankowski 74'; Sotoca (yellow card) 88'	Report	Mandava (yellow card) 21'; Çelik (yellow card) 90+3'	Stadium: Stade Bollaert-Delelis; Attendance: 36,512; Referee: Benoît Millot

22 September 2021 7	Lille	2–1	Reims	Villeneuve-d'Ascq
19:00 CEST (UTC+2)	David 31'; André 43'; Botman (yellow card) 74'; Yazıcı (yellow card) 90+2'	Report	Flips 74' (pen.); Gravillon (yellow card) 90+1'	Stadium: Stade Pierre-Mauroy; Attendance: 32,604; Referee: Johan Hamel

25 September 2021 8	Strasbourg	1–2	Lille	Strasbourg
19:00 CEST (UTC+2)	Diallo (yellow card) 19'; Djiku (yellow card) 38'; Le Marchand (yellow card) 38'; Sissoko 75'; Thomasson (red card) 79'; Ajorque (yellow card) 83'	Report	David 23', 57' (pen.); Grbić (yellow card) 70'; Djaló (yellow card) 78'; Xeka (yellow card) 81'; Mandava (yellow card) 90+1'	Stadium: Stade de la Meinau; Attendance: 23,762; Referee: François Letexier

3 October 2021 9	Lille	2–0	Marseille	Villeneuve-d'Ascq
17:00 CEST (UTC+2)	Mandava (yellow card) 11'; David 28', 90+4'; Yılmaz (yellow card) 66'	Report	Ünder (yellow card) 24' (yellow-red card) 77'; Balerdi (yellow card) 37'	Stadium: Stade Pierre-Mauroy; Attendance: 44,839; Referee: Jérémie Pignard

16 October 2021 10	Clermont	1–0	Lille	Clermont-Ferrand
17:00 CEST (UTC+2)	N'Simba 32'; Tell (yellow card) 85'	Report	Sanches (yellow card) 32'; Xeka (yellow card) 57'; André (yellow card) 90+2'	Stadium: Stade Gabriel Montpied; Attendance: 11,537; Referee: Eric Wattellier

23 October 2021 11	Lille	1–1	Brest	Villeneuve-d'Ascq
21:00 CEST (UTC+2)	David 19'; Mandava (yellow card) 31'	Report	Faivre 32'; Hérelle (yellow card) 70'; Bizot (yellow card) 90+1'	Stadium: Stade Pierre-Mauroy; Attendance: 36,613; Referee: Clément Turpin

29 October 2021 12	Paris Saint-Germain	2–1	Lille	Paris
21:00 CEST (UTC+2)	Marquinhos 74'; Neymar (yellow card) 86'; Di María 88'	Report	Mandava (yellow card) 5'; David 31'; Yılmaz (yellow card) 36'; Sanches (yellow card) 57'; Çelik (yellow card) 63'; Grbić (yellow card) 85'	Stadium: Parc des Princes; Attendance: 47,874; Referee: Amaury Delerue

6 November 2021 13	Lille	1–1	Angers	Villeneuve-d'Ascq
17:00 CET (UTC+1)	Bamba (yellow card) 15'; Djaló 27'; André (yellow card) 69'; Onana (red card) 90+6'	Report	Doumbia (yellow card) 27'; Ounahi 83'; Petković (yellow card) 90'	Stadium: Stade Pierre-Mauroy; Attendance: 33,305; Referee: François Letexier

19 November 2021 14	Monaco	2–2	Lille	Monaco
21:00 CET (UTC+1)	Pavlović (yellow card) 3' (yellow-red card) 78'; Diatta 41'; Ben Yedder 82'; Fofana (yellow card) 84'	Report	David 5' (pen.), 9', (yellow card) 37'; Çelik (yellow card) 7'; Yazıcı (yellow card) 68'; Weah (yellow card) 73'; Niasse (yellow card) 85'	Stadium: Stade Louis II; Attendance: 3,778; Referee: Willy Delajod

27 November 2021 15	Lille	1–1	Nantes	Villeneuve-d'Ascq
17:00 CET (UTC+1)	Yılmaz 9'; Onana (yellow card) 62'; David (penalty missed) 79'	Report	Girotto (yellow card) 21'; Blas 24', (yellow card) 48'; Fábio (red card) 78'	Stadium: Stade Pierre-Mauroy; Attendance: 30,419; Referee: Johan Hamel

1 December 2021 16	Rennes	1–2	Lille	Rennes
21:00 CET (UTC+1)	Martin (yellow card) 65'; Bourigeaud 85'; Meling (yellow card) 90+1'	Report	Xeka 31'; Sanches 45'; Mandava (yellow card) 89'	Stadium: Roazhon Park; Attendance: 25,392; Referee: Stéphanie Frappart

4 December 2021 17	Lille	2–1	Troyes	Villeneuve-d'Ascq
19:00 CET (UTC+1)	Xeka (yellow card) 41'; David 48'; Yılmaz (yellow card) 66'; Giraudon 85' (o.g.); Onana (yellow card) 88'	Report	Dingomé 6', (yellow card) 59'; Kouamé (yellow card) 22'; Giraudon (yellow card) 33'; Salmier (yellow card) 33'	Stadium: Stade Pierre-Mauroy; Attendance: 28,286; Referee: Benoît Bastien

12 December 2021 18	Lille	0–0	Lyon	Villeneuve-d'Ascq
13:00 CET (UTC+1)	André (yellow card) 17'; Çelik (yellow card) 22'	Report	Mendes (yellow card) 24'; Da Silva (yellow card) 45+1'; Gusto (yellow card) 82'; Dembélé (yellow card) 88'; Boateng (yellow card) 90+3'; Cherki (yellow card) 90+5'	Stadium: Stade Pierre-Mauroy; Attendance: 40,248; Referee: Amaury Deleure

22 December 2021 19	Bordeaux	2–3	Lille	Bordeaux
21:00 CET (UTC+1)	Elis 18', 45'; Fransérgio (yellow card) 45+1'	Report	André 33'; Yılmaz (yellow card) 36', (goal) 77' (pen.); Sanches (yellow card) 37'; David 84'; Djaló (yellow card) 88'	Stadium: Matmut Atlantique; Attendance: 39,967; Referee: Mikaël Lesage

16 January 2022 21	Marseille	1–1	Lille	Marseille
20:45 CET (UTC+1)	Guendouzi (yellow card) 4'; Ünder 75'	Report	Botman 15'; André (yellow card) 30' (yellow-red card) 32'; Grbić (yellow card) 55'; Çelik (yellow card) 55'; Lihadji (yellow card) 86'	Stadium: Stade Vélodrome; Attendance: 5,034; Referee: Amaury Delerue

19 January 2022 20	Lille	3–1	Lorient	Villeneuve-d'Ascq
19:00 CET (UTC+1)	Lihadji 10'; Jenz 19' (o.g.); Mandava 31'	Report	Soumano 90+1'	Stadium: Stade Pierre-Mauroy; Attendance: 4,834; Referee: Florent Batta

22 January 2022 22	Brest	2–0	Lille	Brest
17:00 CET (UTC+1)	Djaló 3' (o.g.); Mounié (yellow card) 11', (goal) 90+4' (pen.); Agoumé (yellow card) 27'	Report	Yılmaz (yellow card) 54'; Mandava (yellow card) 57'; Sanches (yellow card) 58'	Stadium: Stade Francis-Le Blé; Attendance: 4,358; Referee: Jérôme Brisard

6 February 2022 23	Lille	1–5	Paris Saint-Germain	Villeneuve-d'Ascq
20:45 CET (UTC+1)	Botman 28'; Çelik (yellow card) 75'; Bradarić (yellow card) 83'	Report	Pereira 10', 51'; Kimpembe 32'; Messi 38'; Paredes (yellow card) 45+1'; Mbappé 67'	Stadium: Stade Pierre-Mauroy; Attendance: 48,437; Referee: François Letexier

12 February 2022 24	Montpellier	0–1	Lille	Montpellier
17:00 CET (UTC+1)	Ferri (yellow card) 46'; Savanier (yellow card) 83'; Germain (yellow card) 87'	Report	André (yellow card) 18'; Gomes (yellow card) 22'; Çelik (yellow card) 45'; Xeka (yellow card) 64', (goal) 77'	Stadium: Stade de la Mosson; Attendance: 11,784; Referee: Stéphanie Frappart

18 February 2022 25	Lille	0–0	Metz	Villeneuve-d'Ascq
21:00 CET (UTC+1)	Zhegrova (yellow card) 83' (yellow-red card) 90+2'; Fonte (yellow card) 87'; Djaló (yellow card) 90+7'	Report	Maïga (yellow card) 22'; Kouyaté (yellow card) 67'; Caillard (yellow card) 79'; Amadou (yellow card) 90+7'	Stadium: Stade Pierre-Mauroy; Attendance: 30,384; Referee: Bastien Dechepy

27 February 2022 26	Lyon	0–1	Lille	Décines-Charpieu
20:45 CET (UTC+1)	Dembélé (yellow card) 19'; Caqueret (yellow card) 43'; Aouar (yellow card) 90+2'	Report	Gudmundsson 35'; David (yellow card) 81'; Xeka (yellow card) 83'	Stadium: Groupama Stadium; Attendance: 42,657; Referee: Clément Turpin

6 March 2022 27	Lille	4–0	Clermont	Villeneuve-d'Ascq
17:05 CET (UTC+1)	Bamba 3'; Ben Arfa (yellow card) 50'; David 72'; Çelik 84'; Zhegrova 90'	Report	Abdul Samed (yellow card) 36' (yellow-red card) 68'; Seidu (yellow card) 66'	Stadium: Stade Pierre-Mauroy; Attendance: 33,515; Referee: Thomas Léonard

11 March 2022 28	Lille	0–0	Saint-Étienne	Villeneuve-d'Ascq
21:00 CET (UTC+1)	Botman (yellow card) 64'	Report	Moukoudi (yellow card) 80'	Stadium: Stade Pierre-Mauroy; Attendance: 40,146; Referee: Florent Batta

19 March 2022 29	Nantes	0–1	Lille	Nantes
21:00 CET (UTC+1)	Moutoussamy (yellow card) 53'; Blas (yellow card) 81'; Fábio (yellow card) 86'	Report	Xeka (yellow card) 15'; Onana 41'; Weah (red card) 64'; André (yellow card) 64'; Bamba (yellow card) 79'; Bradarić (yellow card) 86'	Stadium: Stade de la Beaujoire; Attendance: 25,977; Referee: Pierre Gaillouste

2 April 2022 30	Lille	0–0	Bordeaux	Villeneuve-d'Ascq
19:00 CEST (UTC+2)	Yılmaz (yellow card) 19'; André (yellow card) 44'	Report	Kwateng (yellow card) 21' (yellow-red card) 35'; Ihnatenko (yellow card) 84'; Poussin (yellow card) 86'	Stadium: Stade Pierre-Mauroy; Attendance: 36,351; Referee: Bastien Dechepy

10 April 2022 31	Angers	1–1	Lille	Angers
15:00 CEST (UTC+2)	Bentaleb (yellow card) 45+1'; Thomas (yellow card) 54'; Djaló 64' (o.g.); Doumbia (yellow card) 70'	Report	Yılmaz (yellow card) 45+3'; Fonte (yellow card) 65'; Zhegrova 74'	Stadium: Stade Raymond Kopa; Attendance: 9,286; Referee: Thomas Léonard

16 April 2022 32	Lille	1–2	Lens	Villeneuve-d'Ascq
21:00 CEST (UTC+2)	Xeka (yellow card) 18', (goal) 45+1'; David (yellow card) 29'; Sanches (yellow card) 45+3'	Report	Frankowski 4'; Kalimuendo 37'; Gradit (yellow card) 45+3'; Cahuzac (yellow card) 90'	Stadium: Stade Pierre-Mauroy; Attendance: 48,169; Referee: Jérôme Brisard

20 April 2022 33	Reims	2–1	Lille	Reims
19:00 CEST (UTC+2)	Munetsi 32'; Lopy (yellow card) 76'; Abdelhamid 90+2'	Report	Sanches 57'; Çelik (yellow card) 89'	Stadium: Stade Auguste-Delaune; Attendance: 10,910; Referee: Hakim Ben El Hadj

24 April 2022 34	Lille	1–0	Strasbourg	Villeneuve-d'Ascq
17:05 CEST (UTC+2)	Gudmundsson (yellow card) 36'; Botman (yellow card) 60'; Çelik 87'	Report	Perrin (yellow card) 40'; Guilbert (yellow card) 70'; Djiku (yellow card) 71'	Stadium: Stade Pierre-Mauroy; Attendance: 30,211; Referee: Jérémie Pignard

1 May 2022 35	Troyes	3–0	Lille	Troyes
13:00 CEST (UTC+2)	Tardieu 43' (pen.), 86' (pen.); Ugbo 55' (pen.)	Report	Sanches (yellow card) 50' (yellow-red card) 50'; Botman (yellow card) 54'; Gudmundsson (yellow card) 61'; Yılmaz (red card) 68'	Stadium: Stade de l'Aube; Attendance: 10,497; Referee: Willy Delajod

6 May 2022 36	Lille	1–2	Monaco	Villeneuve-d'Ascq
21:00 CEST (UTC+2)	Çelik (yellow card) 39'; Fonte (yellow card) 51'; Gomes 69'; André (yellow card) 87'; Bamba (yellow card) 90'	Report	Tchouaméni 42', 75'; Ben Yedder (yellow card) 66'	Stadium: Stade Pierre-Mauroy; Attendance: 39,088; Referee: François Letexier

14 May 2022 37	Nice	1–3	Lille	Nice
21:00 CEST (UTC+2)	Kluivert 31', (yellow card) 90+1'; Lotomba (yellow card) 45'	Report	Gudmundsson (yellow card) 12'; David 51', 62'; Gomes (yellow card) 66'; Weah (yellow card) 90+3', (goal) 90+5'	Stadium: Allianz Riviera; Attendance: 24,232; Referee: Thomas Léonard

21 May 2022 38	Lille	2–2	Rennes	Villeneuve-d'Ascq
21:00 CEST (UTC+2)	Weah 11', 88'; André (yellow card) 25'; Sanches (yellow card) 57'	Report	Bourigeaud 41'; Truffert (yellow card) 43'; Omari (yellow card) 54'; Guirassy 90+2'	Stadium: Stade Pierre-Mauroy; Attendance: 40,116; Referee: Amaury Delerue

=== Coupe de France ===
18 December 2021 Round of 64	Lille	3–1	Auxerre	Villeneuve-d'Ascq
18:30 CET (UTC+1)	Gomes 23'; David 33'; Çelik 39'	Report	Dugimont 48'	Stadium: Stade Pierre-Mauroy; Attendance: 12,093; Referee: Eric Wattellier

4 January 2022 Round of 32	Lens	2–2 (4–3 p)	Lille	Lens
21:00 CET (UTC+1)	Fofana 67', 90+5', (yellow card) 90+6'	Report	Onana 28', 33'; Mandava (yellow card) 72'; Grbić (yellow card) 90'	Stadium: Stade Bollaert-Delelis; Attendance: 5,000; Referee: Willy Delajod
	Penalties
	Saïd (penalty scored); Kakuta (penalty scored); Jean (penalty scored); Clauss (penalty missed); Fofana (penalty scored)		(penalty scored) Bamba; (penalty missed) Fonte; (penalty scored) Botman; (penalty scored) Pied; (penalty missed) Sanches

=== Trophée des Champions ===
1 August 2021 Final	Lille	1–0	Paris Saint-Germain	Tel Aviv
21:00 CEST (UTC+2)	Xeka 45'; Luiz Araújo (yellow card) 78'; Jardim (yellow card) 90+2'	Report	Kehrer (yellow card) 30'; Diallo (yellow card) 52'; Draxler (yellow card) 85'; Pereira (yellow card) 90+4'	Stadium: Bloomfield Stadium; Attendance: 29,000; Referee: Yigal Frid (Israel)

=== UEFA Champions League ===
==== Group stage ====
The draw for the group stage was held on 26 August 2021.

Pos	Team	Pld	W	D	L	GF	GA	GD	Pts	Qualification	LIL	SAL	SEV	WOL
1	(France) Lille	6	3	2	1	7	4	+3	11	Advance to knockout phase	—	1–0	0–0	0–0
2	(Austria) Red Bull Salzburg	6	3	1	2	8	6	+2	10	Advance to knockout phase	2–1	—	1–0	3–1
3	(Spain) Sevilla	6	1	3	2	5	5	0	6	Transfer to Europa League	1–2	1–1	—	2–0
4	(Germany) VfL Wolfsburg	6	1	2	3	5	10	−5	5		1–3	2–1	1–1	—

Source: UEFA
Rules for classification: Group stage tiebreakers

14 September 2021 1	Lille (France)	0–0	(Germany) VfL Wolfsburg	Villeneuve-d'Ascq, France
21:00 CEST (UTC+2)	André (yellow card) 31'; Ikoné (yellow card) 63'	Report	Brooks (yellow card) 45+2' (yellow-red card) 63'; Guilavogui (yellow card) 56'; Waldschmidt (yellow card) 65'; Nmecha (yellow card) 70'; Lacroix (yellow card) 86'	Stadium: Stade Pierre-Mauroy; Attendance: 34,314; Referee: Danny Makkelie (Netherlands)

29 September 2021 2	Red Bull Salzburg (Austria)	2–1	(France) Lille	Salzburg, Austria
21:00 CEST (UTC+2)	Adeyemi 35' (pen.), 53' (pen.), (yellow card) 54'; Capaldo (yellow card) 90+3'	Report	Botman (yellow card) 30'; Xeka (yellow card) 45+1'; Yılmaz (yellow card) 51', (goal) 62'; Fonte (yellow card) 66'; Bamba (yellow card) 89'	Stadium: Stadion Wals-Siezenheim; Attendance: 24,207; Referee: Halil Umut Meler (Turkey)

20 October 2021 3	Lille (France)	0–0	(Spain) Sevilla	Villeneuve-d'Ascq, France
21:00 CEST (UTC+2)	Çelik (yellow card) 59'; Ikoné (yellow card) 77'; André (yellow card) 88'; Yılmaz (yellow card) 90+2'	Report	Lamela (yellow card) 87'	Stadium: Stade Pierre-Mauroy; Attendance: 34,362; Referee: Michael Oliver (England)

2 November 2021 4	Sevilla (Spain)	1–2	(France) Lille	Seville, Spain
21:00 CET (UTC+1)	Ocampos 15', (yellow card) 90'; Delaney (yellow card) 42'; En-Nesyri (yellow card) 60'; Montiel (yellow card) 90+5'; Diego Carlos (yellow card) 90+6'	Report	David 43' (pen.); Ikoné 51', (yellow card) 79'; Bamba (yellow card) 78'; André (yellow card) 87'; Xeka (yellow card) 90+5'; Grbić (yellow card) 90+6'; Yazıcı (yellow card) 90+7'	Stadium: Ramón Sánchez Pizjuán; Attendance: 29,369; Referee: István Kovács (Romania)

23 November 2021 5	Lille (France)	1–0	(Austria) Red Bull Salzburg	Villeneuve-d'Ascq, France
21:00 CET (UTC+1)	Djaló (yellow card) 14'; David 31'; Xeka (yellow card) 67'; Bamba (yellow card) 90+5'	Report	Kristensen (yellow card) 8'; Seiwald (yellow card) 35'; Kjaergaard (yellow card) 90'; Adeyemi (yellow card) 90+6'	Stadium: Stade Pierre-Mauroy; Attendance: 33,573; Referee: Anthony Taylor (England)

8 December 2021 6	VfL Wolfsburg (Germany)	1–3	(France) Lille	Wolfsburg, Germany
21:00 CET (UTC+1)	Bornauw (yellow card) 17'; Arnold (yellow card) 62'; Roussillon (yellow card) 87'; Steffen 89', (yellow card) 90+3'	Report	Yılmaz 11'; Fonte (yellow card) 18'; Ikoné (yellow card) 62'; David 72'; Gomes 78'; Mandava (yellow card) 90+3'	Stadium: Volkswagen Arena; Attendance: 6,544; Referee: Daniele Orsato (Italy)

==== Knockout phase ====
===== Round of 16 =====
The draw for the round of 16 was held on 13 December 2021.

22 February 2022 First leg	Chelsea (England)	2–0	(France) Lille	London, England
21:00 CET (UTC+1)	Havertz 8'; Pulisic 63'; Loftus-Cheek (yellow card) 83'	Report	Ben Arfa (yellow card) 87'	Stadium: Stamford Bridge; Attendance: 38,832; Referee: Jesús Gil Manzano (Spain)

16 March 2022 Second leg	Lille (France)	1–2 (1–4 agg.)	(England) Chelsea	Villeneuve-d'Ascq, France
21:00 CET (UTC+1)	Yılmaz 38' (pen.); Gudmundsson (yellow card) 43'; Fonte (yellow card) 90+4'	Report	Chalobah (yellow card) 34'; Pulisic 45+3'; Azpilicueta 71'	Stadium: Stade Pierre-Mauroy; Attendance: 49,048; Referee: Davide Massa (Italy)

== Statistics ==
=== Appearances and goals ===
No.	Pos	Nat	Player	Total		Ligue 1		Coupe de France		Trophée des Champions		UEFA Champions League	
No.	Pos	Nat	Player	Apps	Goals	Apps	Goals	Apps	Goals	Apps	Goals	Apps	Goals
Goalkeepers
1	GK	(Croatia) CRO	Ivo Grbić	29	0	21	0	2	0	0	0	6	0
16	GK	(Slovakia) SVK	Adam Jakubech	0	0	0	0	0	0	0	0	0	0
30	GK	(Brazil) BRA	Léo Jardim	20	0	17	0	0	0	1	0	2	0
-	GK	(Greece) GRE	Orestis Karnezis	0	0	0	0	0	0	0	0	0	0
Defenders
2	DF	(Turkey) TUR	Zeki Çelik	40	3	30+2	2	1	1	0	0	7	0
3	DF	(Portugal) POR	Tiago Djaló	37	1	26+1	1	2	0	1	0	6+1	0
4	DF	(Netherlands) NED	Sven Botman	32	3	25	3	1	0	1	0	5	0
5	DF	(Sweden) SWE	Gabriel Gudmundsson	36	1	15+15	1	2	0	0	0	3+1	0
6	DF	(Portugal) POR	José Fonte	49	0	38	0	2	0	1	0	8	0
26	DF	(France) FRA	Jérémy Pied	2	0	0+2	0	0	0	0	0	0	0
29	DF	(Croatia) CRO	Domagoj Bradarić	17	0	2+13	0	0	0	0+1	0	0+1	0
33	DF	(France) FRA	Leny Yoro	1	0	0+1	0	0	0	0	0	0	0
Midfielders
8	MF	(Portugal) POR	Xeka	32	4	19+4	3	0	0	1	1	5+3	0
10	MF	(Portugal) POR	Renato Sanches	32	2	20+5	2	2	0	0	0	5	0
11	MF	(France) FRA	Hatem Ben Arfa	9	0	4+3	0	0	0	0	0	0+2	0
20	MF	(England) ENG	Angel Gomes	30	3	12+12	1	2	1	0	0	2+2	1
21	MF	(France) FRA	Benjamin André	42	2	33	2	0+1	0	1	0	7	0
23	MF	(Kosovo) KOS	Edon Zhegrova	14	2	5+8	2	0	0	0	0	0+1	0
24	MF	(Belgium) BEL	Amadou Onana	43	3	11+21	1	2	2	0	0	2+7	0
Forwards
7	FW	(France) FRA	Jonathan Bamba	38	1	28+3	1	1	0	0	0	5+1	0
9	FW	(Canada) CAN	Jonathan David	48	19	32+6	15	1	1	1	0	8	3
17	FW	(Turkey) TUR	Burak Yılmaz	40	7	25+6	4	1	0	1	0	6+1	3
19	FW	(France) FRA	Isaac Lihadji	18	1	2+11	1	0+2	0	0	0	0+3	0
22	FW	(United States) USA	Timothy Weah	35	3	17+12	3	0	0	0+1	0	3+2	0
Players transferred out during the season
10	MF	(France) FRA	Jonathan Ikoné	25	2	13+5	1	1	0	0+1	0	3+2	1
11	MF	(Turkey) TUR	Yusuf Yazıcı	23	1	5+10	1	1+1	0	0+1	0	0+5	0
15	MF	(Mexico) MEX	Eugenio Pizzuto	0	0	0	0	0	0	0	0	0	0
27	DF	(Senegal) SEN	Cheikh Niasse	5	0	0+4	0	0+1	0	0	0	0	0
28	DF	(Mozambique) MOZ	Reinildo Mandava	27	1	18	1	1+1	0	1	0	5+1	0

Source: Competitions

=== Goalscorers ===
Rank	No.	Pos.	Nat.	Player	Ligue 1	Coupe de France	Trophée des Champions	Champions League	Total
1	9	FW	(Canada)	Jonathan David	15	1	0	3	19
2	17	FW	(Turkey)	Burak Yılmaz	4	0	0	3	7
3	8	MF	(Portugal)	Xeka	3	0	1	0	4
4	2	DF	(Turkey)	Zeki Çelik	2	1	0	0	3
4	4	DF	(Netherlands)	Sven Botman	3	0	0	0	3
4	20	MF	(England)	Angel Gomes	1	1	0	1	3
4	22	FW	(United States)	Timothy Weah	3	0	0	0	3
4	24	MF	(Belgium)	Amadou Onana	1	2	0	0	3
9	10	FW	(France)	Jonathan Ikoné	1	0	0	1	2
9	10	MF	(Portugal)	Renato Sanches	2	0	0	0	2
9	21	MF	(France)	Benjamin André	2	0	0	0	2
9	23	MF	(Kosovo)	Edon Zhegrova	2	0	0	0	2
13	3	DF	(Portugal)	Tiago Djaló	1	0	0	0	1
13	5	DF	(Sweden)	Gabriel Gudmundsson	1	0	0	0	1
13	7	FW	(France)	Jonathan Bamba	1	0	0	0	1
13	11	MF	(Turkey)	Yusuf Yazıcı	1	0	0	0	1
13	19	FW	(France)	Isaac Lihadji	1	0	0	0	1
13	28	DF	(Mozambique)	Reinildo Mandava	1	0	0	0	1
Own goals					3	0	0	0	3
Totals					48	5	1	8	62
