= Cheikh Niasse =

Senegalese footballer

Personal information
- Full name: Cheikh Ahmet Tidian Niasse
- Date of birth: 19 January 2000 (age 26)
- Place of birth: Gossas, Senegal
- Height: 1.88 m (6 ft 2 in)
- Position: Defensive midfielder

Team information
- Current team: Gençlerbirliği (on loan from Hellas Verona)
- Number: 19

Youth career
- 2004–2016: Boulogne
- 2016–2018: Lille

Senior career*
Years	Team	Apps	(Gls)
2017–2022	Lille B	43	(2)
2019–2022	Lille	5	(0)
2021	→ Panathinaikos (loan)	13	(0)
2022–2025	Young Boys	80	(1)
2025	→ Hellas Verona (loan)	11	(0)
2025–	Hellas Verona	20	(0)
2026–	→ Gençlerbirliği (loan)	1	(0)

International career^{‡}
2025–	Senegal	1	(0)
- * Club domestic league appearances and goals as of 23 August 2026 ‡ National team caps and goals as of 10 October 2025

Cheikh Ahmet Tidian Niasse (born 19 January 2000) is a Senegalese professional footballer who plays as a defensive midfielder for Süper Lig club Gençlerbirliği, on loan from Serie B club Hellas Verona, and the Senegal national team.

== Club career ==
On 24 January 2019, Niasse signed a professional contract with Lille OSC for three years. Niasse made his professional debut for Lille in a 3–0 Ligue 1 win over AS Saint-Étienne on 28 August 2019.

On 10 December 2020, he made his debut in the UEFA Europa League in a group match against Celtic.

On 1 February 2021, Niasse moved to Greek club Panathinaikos, on a loan deal until the end of the season.

On 3 February 2022, Niasse signed a contract with Young Boys in Switzerland until June 2026.

On 31 January 2025, Niasse moved to Serie A club Hellas Verona on loan with a conditional obligation to buy. On 20 August 2026, Niasse joined Gençlerbirliği in Turkey on a season-long loan with an option to buy.

== Career statistics ==
As of match played 25 May 2025

Appearances and goals by club, season and competition
Club	Season	League			National cup		League cup		Continental		Other		Total	
Club	Season	Division	Apps	Goals	Apps	Goals	Apps	Goals	Apps	Goals	Apps	Goals	Apps	Goals
Lille B	2016–17	CFA	1	0	—		—		—		—		1	0
Lille B	2018–19	National 2	24	2	—		—		—		—		24	2
Lille B	2019–20	National 2	16	0	—		—		—		—		16	0
Lille B	2020–21	National 3	1	0	—		—		—		—		1	0
Lille B	2021–22	National 3	1	0	—		—		—		—		1	0
Lille B	Total		43	2	—		—		—		—		43	2
Lille	2019–20	Ligue 1	1	0	0	0	0	0	0	0	—		1	0
Lille	2020–21	Ligue 1	0	0	—		—		1 (Note: Appearances in UEFA Europa League)	0	—		1	0
Lille	2021–22	Ligue 1	4	0	1	0	—		0	0	0	0	5	0
Lille	Total		5	0	1	0	0	0	1	0	0	0	7	0
Panathinaikos (loan)	2020–21	Super League Greece	13	0	2	0	—		—		—		15	0
Young Boys	2021–22	Swiss Super League	10	1	—		—		—		—		10	1
Young Boys	2022–23	Swiss Super League	26	0	5	0	—		4 (Note: Appearances in UEFA Europa Conference League)	1	—		35	1
Young Boys	2023–24	Swiss Super League	30	0	3	0	—		8 (Note: Six appearances in UEFA Champions League, two appearances in UEFA Europa League)	0	—		41	0
Young Boys	2024–25	Swiss Super League	14	0	2	0	—		7 (Note: Appearances in UEFA Champions League)	0	—		23	0
Young Boys	Total		80	1	10	0	—		19	1	—		109	2
Hellas Verona (loan)	2024–25	Serie A	11	0	—		—		—		—		11	0
Career total			152	2	13	0	0	0	20	1	0	0	185	3

== Honours ==
Lille

- Trophée des Champions: 2021

Young Boys

- Swiss Super League: 2022–23, 2023–24
- Swiss Cup: 2022–23
