= Isaac Lihadji =

French footballer (born 2002)

Personal information
- Full name: Isaac Lihadji
- Date of birth: 10 April 2002 (age 24)
- Place of birth: Marseille, France
- Height: 1.77 m (5 ft 10 in)
- Position: Forward

Team information
- Current team: Al-Arabi
- Number: 80

Youth career
- 2011–2014: Septèmes
- 2014–2019: Marseille

Senior career*
Years	Team	Apps	(Gls)
2019–2020	Marseille B	9	(1)
2019–2020	Marseille	2	(0)
2020–2023	Lille	28	(1)
2021–2023	Lille B	11	(1)
2023	Sunderland	6	(0)
2023–2024	Al-Duhail	18	(1)
2024–	Al-Arabi	28	(2)

International career
2017	France U16	2	(0)
2018–2019	France U17	12	(0)
2019	France U18	10	(4)
2020	France U19	1	(0)
2021	France U20	2	(0)
2020	France U21	2	(1)
- * Club domestic league appearances and goals as of 17 January 2026

Isaac Lihadji (born 10 April 2002) is a French professional footballer who plays as a forward for Qatar Stars League side Al-Arabi.

== Club career ==
=== Marseille ===
Lihadji made his debut on 24 September 2019 in a Ligue 1 game against Dijon. He replaced Hiroki Sakai after 78 minutes in a 0–0 away draw.

=== Lille ===
On 2 July 2020, Lihadji signed with fellow Ligue 1 side Lille OSC.

=== Sunderland ===
On 26 January 2023, Lihadji signed a two-and-a-half-year deal with Championship side Sunderland, with the option of an extension for a further year. Lihadji's game time was limited early on due to not speaking English, with manager Tony Mowbray saying "He understands when you say his name but beyond that, I need a bit of a help translating. So in the short term, he might be someone who we bring on from the bench to see if he can impact the game with the qualities that he's got.".

He made his debut on the 11 February 2023 against Reading. Mowbray turned to his bench and introduced Isaac Lihadji, coming on in the 75th minute.

=== Al-Duhail ===
On 5 August 2023, Lihadji completed a move to Qatari side Al-Duhail for an undisclosed fee.

== International career ==
Born in France, Lihadji is of Comorian descent. He is a youth international for France.

== Career statistics ==
As of match played 8 May 2023

Appearances and goals by club, season and competition
Club	Season	League			National Cup		League Cup		Europe		Other		Total	
Club	Season	Division	Apps	Goals	Apps	Goals	Apps	Goals	Apps	Goals	Apps	Goals	Apps	Goals
Marseille	2019–20	Ligue 1	2	0	0	0	0	0	—		—		2	0
Marseille B	2019–20	Championnat National 2	9	1	—		—		—		—		9	1
Lille	2020–21	Ligue 1	15	0	2	0	—		4	0	—		21	0
Lille	2021–22	Ligue 1	8	1	2	0	—		3	0	0	0	13	1
Lille	2022–23	Ligue 1	0	0	0	0	0	0	—		—		0	0
Lille	Total		23	1	4	0	0	0	7	0	0	0	34	1
Lille B	2021–22	Championnat National 3	3	1	—		—		—		—		3	1
Lille B	2022–23	Championnat National 3	8	0	—		—		—		—		8	0
Lille B	Total		11	1	—		—		—		—		11	1
Sunderland	2022–23	EFL Championship	6	0	0	0	—		—		0	0	6	0
Career total			51	3	4	0	0	0	7	0	0	0	62	3

== Honours ==
Lille

- Ligue 1: 2020–21
- Trophée des Champions: 2021

France U17

- FIFA U-17 World Cup third place: 2019
