= Olivier Létang =

French football executive (born 1972)

President of Lille
- Incumbent
- Assumed office 18 December 2020
- Preceded by: Gérard López

President of Rennes
- In office 3 November 2017 – 7 February 2020
- Born: 29 November 1972 (age 53); Le Mans, France
- Occupations: Football executive; Football sporting director; Footballer
- Known for: President of Lille; President of Rennes; Sporting director of Paris Saint-Germain
- Spouse: Julie Létang
- Children: 3
Association football career
- Height: 1.83 m (6 ft 0 in)
- Position: Midfielder
Senior career*
Years	Team	Apps	(Gls)
1995–1997	Le Mans		
1997–2004	Reims		
- * Club domestic league appearances and goals

Olivier Létang (French pronunciation: [ɔlivje letɑ̃]; born 29 November 1972), is a French football executive and former professional player, serving as the president of Ligue 1 club Lille. Holding this position in Northern France since 2020, he previously worked for other professional clubs, being president of Rennes from 2017 to 2019, and sporting director of Paris Saint-Germain from 2012 to 2017.

== Career ==
After a playing career at Le Mans and then Reims where he later became an executive, Létang worked as the sporting director of Paris Saint-Germain and president of Rennes. In December 2020, he became the president of Lille.

As a football executive, Létang won multiple titles for the different clubs he worked for. During his five-season term at Paris Saint-Germain, he won a total of 15 trophies from 2012 to 2017. Two years after leaving Paris, Rennes won their first domestic cup title since 1971 under his presidency, beating Paris Saint-Germain in the Coupe de France final. In 2021, Létang was elected the best European club football president by Italian sports newspaper Tuttosport after Lille managed to win both Ligue 1 and Trophée des Champions against the odds.

== Honours ==
=== Executive ===
Paris Saint-Germain

- Ligue 1: 2012–13, 2013–14, 2014–15, 2015–16
- Coupe de France: 2014–15, 2015–16, 2016–17
- Trophée des Champions: 2013, 2014, 2015, 2016
- Coupe de la Ligue: 2013–14, 2014–15, 2015–16, 2016–17

Rennes

- Coupe de France: 2018–19

Lille

- Ligue 1: 2020–21
- Trophée des Champions: 2021

Individual

- Tuttosport European President of the Year: 2021
