= 2021 Trophée des Champions =

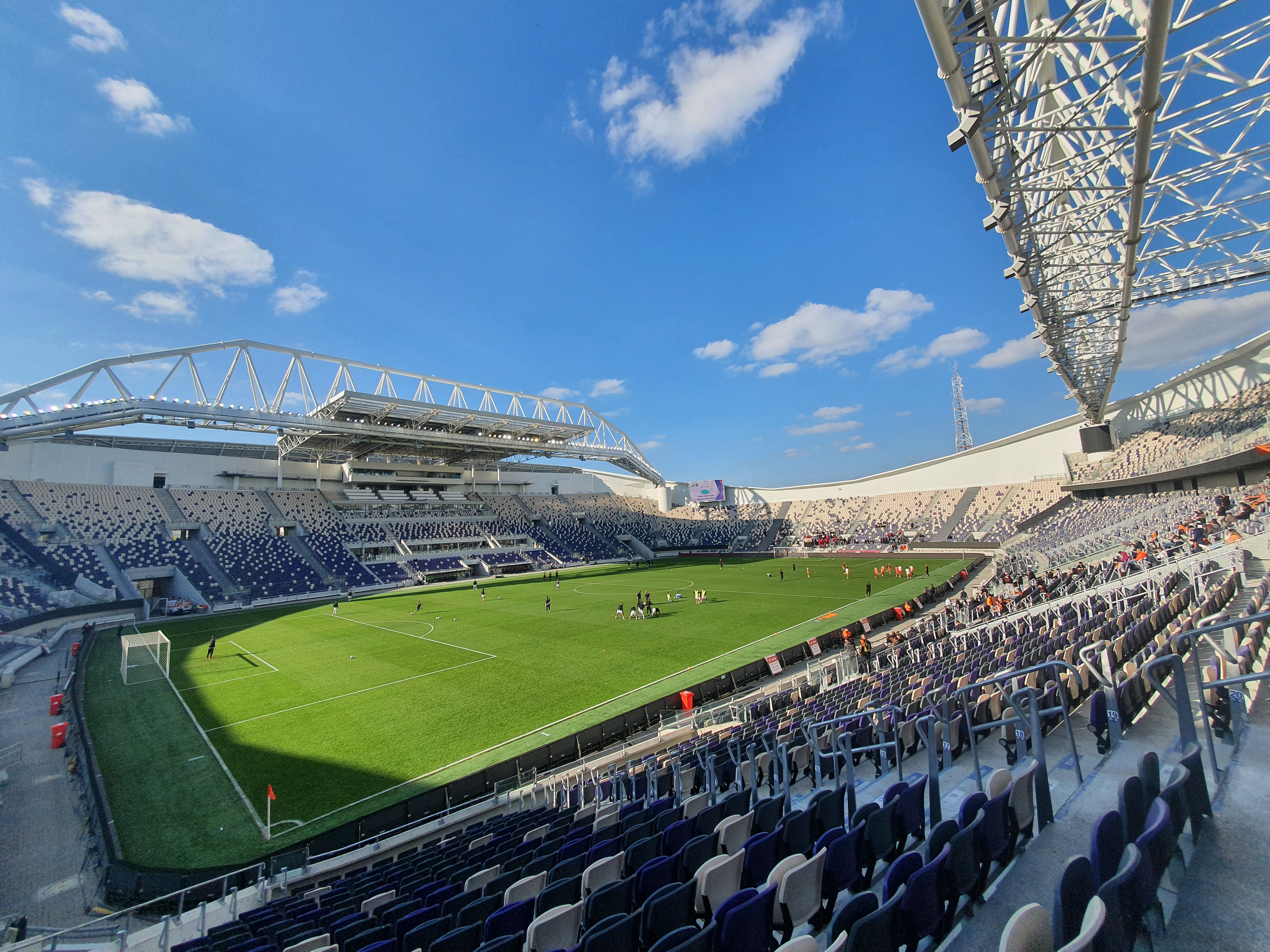
- The match was hosted at Bloomfield Stadium in Tel Aviv.
- Event: Trophée des Champions
Lille	Paris Saint-Germain
1	0
- Date: 1 August 2021
- Venue: Bloomfield Stadium, Tel Aviv, Israel
- Man of the Match: Xeka (Lille)
- Referee: Yigal Frid (Israel)
- Attendance: 29,000

The 2021 Trophée des Champions was the 26th edition of the French super cup. The match was contested by the 2020–21 Ligue 1 champions, Lille, and the 2020–21 Coupe de France winners, Paris Saint-Germain, and took place at Bloomfield Stadium in Tel Aviv, Israel on 1 August 2021.

Lille won the match 1–0 for their first Trophée des Champions, ending PSG's run of eight consecutive titles.

== Host selection ==
On 11 March 2021, the Ligue de Football Professionnel decided that the match would take place at the Bloomfield Stadium in Tel Aviv. The fixture was scheduled for 1 August 2021.

== Match ==
=== Summary ===
In the 45th minute, Xeka scored the only goal of the game for Lille with a powerful right foot shot to the right corner of the net from outside the penalty area.

=== Details ===
1 August 2021
21:00 CEST

Lille	1–0	Paris Saint-Germain
Xeka 45'	Report

Bloomfield Stadium, Tel Aviv
Attendance: 29,000
Referee: Yigal Frid (Israel)

Lille	Paris Saint-Germain

GK	30	(Brazil) Léo Jardim	(yellow card) 90+2'
RB	3	(Portugal) Tiago Djaló
CB	6	(Portugal) José Fonte (c)
CB	4	(Netherlands) Sven Botman
LB	28	(Mozambique) Reinildo Mandava
RM	11	(Brazil) Luiz Araújo	(yellow card) 78'	(substituted off) 85'
CM	21	(France) Benjamin André
CM	8	(Portugal) Xeka		(substituted off) 79'
LM	7	(France) Jonathan Bamba		(substituted off) 85'
CF	9	(Canada) Jonathan David		(substituted off) 76'
CF	17	(Turkey) Burak Yılmaz
Substitutes:
GK	40	(France) Jules Raux
DF	26	(France) Jérémy Pied
DF	27	(Senegal) Cheikh Niasse
DF	29	(Croatia) Domagoj Bradarić		(substituted on) 85'
MF	10	(France) Jonathan Ikoné		(substituted on) 85'
MF	12	(Turkey) Yusuf Yazıcı		(substituted on) 79'
MF	35	(England) Angel Gomes
FW	19	(France) Isaac Lihadji
FW	22	(United States) Timothy Weah		(substituted on) 76'
Manager:
(France) Jocelyn Gourvennec

GK	1	(Costa Rica) Keylor Navas
RB	2	(Morocco) Achraf Hakimi
CB	24	(Germany) Thilo Kehrer	(yellow card) 30'
CB	3	(France) Presnel Kimpembe (c)		(substituted off) 81'
LB	22	(Senegal) Abdou Diallo	(yellow card) 52'
CM	21	(Spain) Ander Herrera
CM	15	(Portugal) Danilo Pereira	(yellow card) 90+3'
CM	36	(France) Junior Dina Ebimbe		(substituted off) 71'
RW	23	(Germany) Julian Draxler	(yellow card) 84'
CF	9	(Argentina) Mauro Icardi
LW	29	(France) Arnaud Kalimuendo		(substituted off) 81'
Substitutes:
GK	30	(France) Alexandre Letellier
DF	20	(France) Layvin Kurzawa		(substituted on) 81'
DF	31	(France) El Chadaille Bitshiabu
MF	18	(Netherlands) Georginio Wijnaldum		(substituted on) 71'
MF	33	(France) Nathan Bitumazala
MF	34	(Netherlands) Xavi Simons
MF	35	(France) Ismaël Gharbi		(substituted on) 81'
MF	38	(France) Edouard Michut
FW	39	(France) Kenny Nagera
Manager:
(Argentina) Mauricio Pochettino

Man of the Match:
Xeka (Lille)

Assistant referees:
David Elias Bitton (Israel)
Sagy Metzamber (Israel)
Fourth official:
Gal Leibovitz (Israel)
Video assistant referee:
David Fuxman (Israel)
Assistant video assistant referee:
Ziv Adler (Israel)

Match rules

- 90 minutes.
- Penalty shoot-out if scores level.
- Nine named substitutes, of which up to five may be used. (Note: Each team was given only three opportunities to make substitutions, excluding substitutions made at half-time.)

== See also ==
- 2021–22 Ligue 1
- 2021–22 Coupe de France
- 2021–22 Lille OSC season
- 2021–22 Paris Saint-Germain FC season
