= Junior Dina Ebimbe =

Footballer (born 2000)

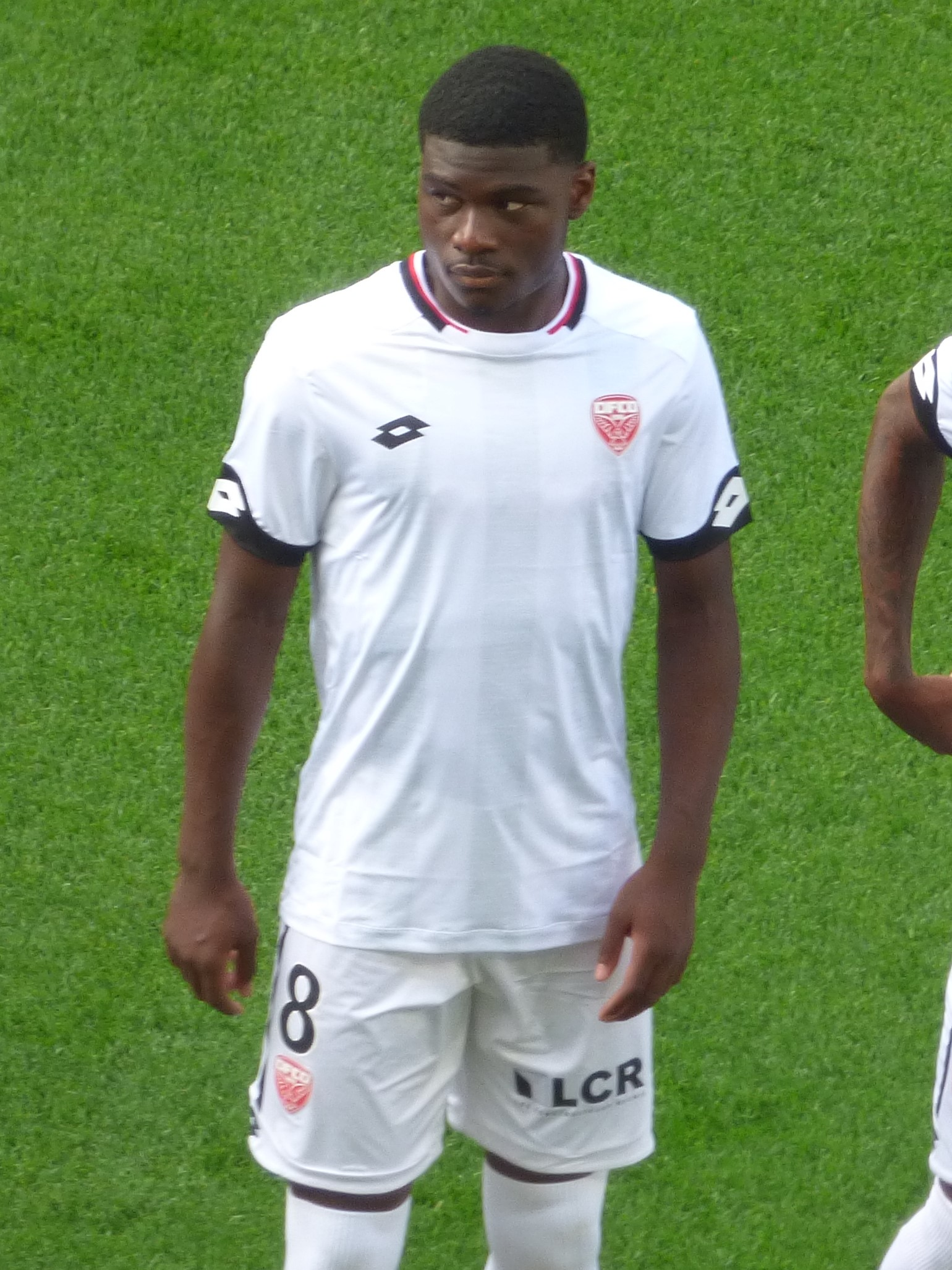
- Dina Ebimbe with Dijon in 2020

Personal information
- Full name: Éric Junior Dina Ebimbe
- Date of birth: 21 November 2000 (age 25)
- Place of birth: Stains, France
- Height: 1.83 m (6 ft 0 in)
- Position: Right midfielder

Team information
- Current team: Schalke 04
- Number: 29

Youth career
- 2006–2012: AAS Sarcelles
- 2012–2018: Paris Saint-Germain

Senior career*
Years	Team	Apps	(Gls)
2018–2019	Paris Saint-Germain B	24	(2)
2019–2023	Paris Saint-Germain	10	(0)
2019–2020	→ Le Havre (loan)	25	(3)
2020–2021	→ Dijon (loan)	30	(1)
2022–2023	→ Eintracht Frankfurt (loan)	19	(3)
2023–2026	Eintracht Frankfurt	38	(5)
2025–2026	→ Brest (loan)	27	(5)
2026–	Schalke 04	8	(0)

International career^{‡}
2019	France U20	3	(4)
2020	France U21	1	(0)
2025–	Cameroon	3	(0)
- * Club domestic league appearances and goals as of 17 November 2026 ‡ National team caps and goals as of 9 January 2026

Éric Junior Dina Ebimbe (born 21 November 2000) is a professional footballer who plays as a right midfielder for Bundesliga club Schalke 04. Born in France, he plays for the Cameroon national team.

== Club career ==
=== Paris Saint-Germain ===
Developed in the Paris Saint-Germain Academy, Dina Ebimbe signed his first professional contract with Paris Saint-Germain (PSG) on 2 July 2018. He spent the 2018–19 season with the reserve team.

On 5 July 2019, Le Havre announced that Dina Ebimbe had joined the Ligue 2 side on loan. Three weeks later on 26 July, he made his professional debut in a 2–2 draw against Ajaccio. He scored his first professional goal on 30 August 2019, in a 3–0 win against Caen. On 6 July 2020, Dijon announced the loan signing of Dina Ebimbe with an option to buy. He made his debut in a 1–0 defeat to Angers on 22 August. On 9 June 2021, Dijon exercised the option-to-buy in Dina Ebimbe's loan deal. However, Paris Saint-Germain exercised their right to veto Dijon's purchase. Dijon received a transfer fee in compensation.

Ahead of the 2021–22 season, Dina Ebimbe returned to Paris Saint-Germain. He participated in pre-season, and went on to make his professional debut for the club in 1–0 Trophée des Champions loss to Lille on 1 August 2021. Dina Ebimbe made his Ligue 1 debut for PSG in a 2–1 win over Troyes on 7 August.

=== Eintracht Frankfurt ===
On 21 August 2022, Dina Ebimbe extended his contract with PSG until June 2024 and joined Bundesliga club Eintracht Frankfurt on a season-long loan deal with an option to buy, made mandatory should the club survive relegation. On 30 May 2023, following the conclusion of 2022–23 season, Eintracht Frankfurt announced that Dina Ebimbe had joined the club on a permanent basis until June 2027.

==== Loan to Brest ====
On 1 September 2025, Dina Ebimbe returned to France and joined Brest on loan with an option to buy.

=== Schalke 04 ===
On 7 August 2026, Schalke 04 announced that they had signed Dina Ebimbe until 30 June 2028.

== International career ==
Dina Ebimbe has represented France at under-20 and under-21 levels.

In October 2024, Dina Ebimbe was included in the Cameroon national team's preliminary squad for the first time. In December 2025, he was named in Cameroon's squad for the 2025 Africa Cup of Nations. On 4 December 2025, Dina Ebimbe's request to switch international allegiance to Cameroon was approved by FIFA.

== Personal life ==
Born in France, Dina Ebimbe is of Cameroonian descent.

== Career statistics ==
=== Club ===
As of match played 8 November 2026

Appearances and goals by club, season and competition
Club	Season	League			Cup (Note: Includes Coupe de France, DFB-Pokal)		Europe		Other		Total	
Club	Season	Division	Apps	Goals	Apps	Goals	Apps	Goals	Apps	Goals	Apps	Goals
Paris Saint-Germain B	2018–19	National 2	24	2	—		—		—		24	2
Paris Saint-Germain	2019–20	Ligue 1	0	0	0	0	0	0	—		0	0
Paris Saint-Germain	2021–22	Ligue 1	10	0	2	0	1 (Note: Appearance(s) in UEFA Champions League)	0	1 (Note: Appearance in Trophée des Champions)	0	14	0
Paris Saint-Germain	Total		10	0	2	0	1	0	1	0	14	0
Le Havre (loan)	2019–20	Ligue 2	25	3	0	0	—		—		25	3
Dijon (loan)	2020–21	Ligue 1	30	1	1	0	—		—		31	1
Eintracht Frankfurt (loan)	2022–23	Bundesliga	19	3	4	0	6	0	—		29	3
Eintracht Frankfurt	2023–24	Bundesliga	31	5	3	2	10 (Note: Appearances in UEFA Europa Conference League)	3	—		44	10
Eintracht Frankfurt	2024–25	Bundesliga	7	0	1	0	4 (Note: Appearances in UEFA Europa League)	2	—		12	2
Eintracht Frankfurt	Total		57	8	8	2	20	5	—		85	15
Brest (loan)	2025–26	Ligue 1	27	5	0	0	—		—		27	5
Schalke 04	2026–27	Bundesliga	8	0	2	0	—		—		10	0
Career total			181	19	13	2	21	5	1	0	216	26

=== International ===
As of match played 9 January 2026

Appearances and goals by national team and year
National team	Year	Apps	Goals
Cameroon	2025	2	0
Cameroon	2026	1	0
Total		3	0

== Honours ==
Paris Saint-Germain

- Ligue 1: 2021–22

Individual

- Bundesliga Rookie of the Month: October 2022, November 2022
