= Sekou Yansané =

French footballer (born 2003)

Personal information
- Full name: Sekou Oumar Yansané
- Date of birth: 28 April 2003 (age 23)
- Place of birth: Grenoble, France
- Height: 1.87 m (6 ft 2 in)
- Position: Forward

Team information
- Current team: Al Duhail
- Number: 7

Youth career
- 2010–2015: Grenoble
- 2015–2018: Lyon
- 2018–2021: Dijon
- 2021–2022: Paris Saint-Germain

Senior career*
Years	Team	Apps	(Gls)
2020	Dijon B	3	(2)
2021–2022	Paris Saint-Germain	1	(0)
2022–2026	Al Ahli	77	(25)
2022	→ Al-Rayyan (loan)	0	(0)
2026–	Al Duhail	0	(0)
- * Club domestic league appearances and goals as of 16:04, 16 September 2026 (UTC)

Sekou Oumar Yansané (born 28 April 2003) is a French professional footballer who plays as a forward for Qatar Stars League club Al Duhail.

== Club career ==
Yansané began his career at his hometown club of Grenoble before signing for Lyon. He continued his career at Dijon, where he played three matches and scored two goals for the reserve side in the Championnat National 3, before signing for Paris Saint-Germain (PSG) on 8 January 2021.

He joined the club for a reported transfer fee of €600,000, signed a contract until June 2023, and was assigned to the club's under-19 side. On 22 December 2021, Yansané made his debut for PSG in a 1–1 Ligue 1 draw away to Lorient. In the 2021–22 season with the PSG under-19s, he scored 21 goals in 23 league games, and was the top scorer of the Championnat National U19.

On 10 September 2022, Yansané signed for Qatar Stars League club Al Ahli. Ten days later, he was loaned out to fellow Qatari club Al-Rayyan until the end of 2022.

Upon his return to Al Ahli, Yansané made his debut in the Qatar Stars League on 5 January 2023, coming on as a substitute in a 2–1 home defeat to Al-Arabi. On 12 January, he scored his first goal for Al Ahli in a 2–1 away victory over Al-Sailiya.

== International career ==
Born in France, Yansané is of Guinean descent through his father and Moroccan descent through his mother. He holds both French and Guinean nationalities. He has been approached by Guinea to play for the senior national team, and by Morocco to play for the under-20 national team.

== Career statistics ==
As of match played 24 December 2025

Appearances and goals by club, season and competition
Club	Season	League			National cup (Note: Includes Coupe de France, Emir of Qatar Cup)		League cup (Note: Includes Qatari Stars Cup)		Continental		Other		Total	
Club	Season	Division	Apps	Goals	Apps	Goals	Apps	Goals	Apps	Goals	Apps	Goals	Apps	Goals
Dijon B	2020–21	Championnat National 3	3	2	—		—		—		—		3	2
Paris Saint-Germain	2021–22	Ligue 1	1	0	0	0	—		0	0	0	0	1	0
Al Ahli	2022–23	Qatar Stars League	15	3	1	0	0	0	—		—		16	3
Al Ahli	2023–24	Qatar Stars League	21	8	1	0	7	5	—		0	0	29	13
Al Ahli	2024–25	Qatar Stars League	21	8	3	1	4	1	—		1 (Note: Appearance in Qatar Cup)	0	29	10
Al Ahli	2025–26	Qatar Stars League	10	1	0	0	1	0	6 (Note: Appearances in AFC Champions League Two)	1	0	0	29	10
Al Ahli	Total		67	20	5	1	12	6	6	1	1	0	91	28
Al-Rayyan (loan)	2022–23	Qatar Stars League	0	0	0	0	4	2	—		—		4	2
Career total			71	22	5	1	16	8	6	1	1	0	99	32

== Honours ==
Paris Saint-Germain

- Ligue 1: 2021–22
