= Xeka =

Portuguese footballer

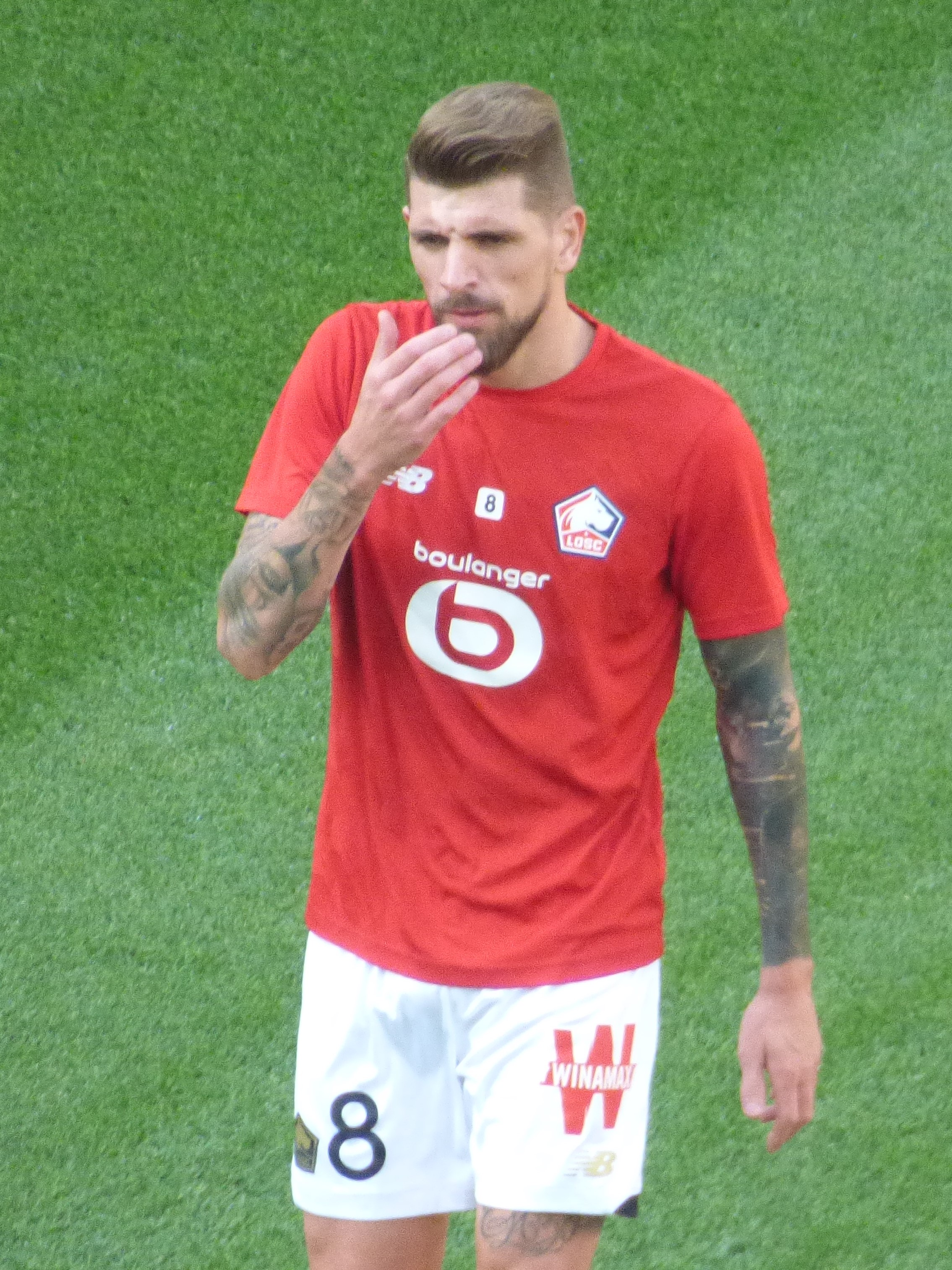
- Xeka playing for Lille in 2021

Personal information
- Full name: Miguel Ângelo da Silva Rocha
- Date of birth: 10 November 1994 (age 32)
- Place of birth: Rebordosa, Portugal
- Height: 1.85 m (6 ft 1 in)
- Position: Midfielder

Team information
- Current team: Estoril
- Number: 8

Youth career
- 2003–2007: Paços Ferreira
- 2007–2011: Gondomar
- 2011–2012: Valencia
- 2012–2013: Paços Ferreira

Senior career*
Years	Team	Apps	(Gls)
2013–2017	Braga B	28	(2)
2014–2016	→ Covilhã (loan)	39	(0)
2016–2017	Braga	11	(0)
2017	→ Lille (loan)	13	(1)
2017–2022	Lille	101	(6)
2017–2018	→ Dijon (loan)	17	(2)
2019	Lille II	1	(0)
2022–2023	Rennes	8	(0)
2024	Al Sadd	0	(0)
2024–	Estoril	26	(2)

International career
2014	Portugal U20	1	(0)
- * Club domestic league appearances and goals as of 25 May 2026

Miguel Ângelo da Silva Rocha (born 10 November 1994), known as Xeka (Portuguese pronunciation: [ˈʃɛkɐ]), is a Portuguese professional footballer who plays as a midfielder for Primeira Liga club Estoril.

Brought up at Braga, he spent much of his career in France, playing for Lille, Dijon and Rennes in Ligue 1 and winning the league with the first of those teams in 2020–21 while making 144 total appearances.

== Club career ==
=== Braga ===
Born in Rebordosa, Paredes, Xeka received his nickname from his grandfather for being the youngest of his siblings, just like him. He played youth football with three clubs, including Valencia CF from Spain until the age of 17. Having returned to his homeland, he started playing as a senior with S.C. Braga's reserves in the Segunda Liga, being then loaned for two years to S.C. Covilhã of the same league. On 23 September 2013, whilst at the service of the former side, he scored his first goal in competition, but in a 1–3 home loss against S.L. Benfica B.

Xeka started being called to Braga's first team in October 2016, by manager José Peseiro. He made his debut in the Primeira Liga later that month, featuring the full 90 minutes in a 1–0 home win over G.D. Chaves. His fortunes changed, however, when Jorge Simão became the new coach before the end of the year.

=== Lille ===
On 31 January 2017, Xeka was loaned to Lille OSC from Ligue 1 until June. He made his debut four days later as a starter in a 1–0 home loss to FC Lorient. He made 13 appearances for the 12th-place team and scored in a 3–0 win at Montpellier HSC on 29 April, assisted by compatriot Rony Lopes.

In June 2017, Lille exercised the €5 million buyout clause to make Xeka's move permanent. In the last hours of the summer transfer window, he joined Dijon FCO in the same league in a season-long loan. He became a regular under Christophe Galtier at the Stade Pierre-Mauroy the following year, but suffered a thigh injury in a 5–1 home victory over Paris Saint-Germain FC on 14 April 2019, ruling him out until September.

Xeka contributed 33 matches and one goal during the 2020–21 campaign to help Lille win the national championship for the fourth time in their history. On 1 August 2021, he scored in the 1–0 defeat of PSG in the Trophée des Champions, with the club winning that trophy for the first time ever.

On 20 May 2022, Xeka was released at the end of his contract.

=== Rennes ===
On 21 September 2022, Xeka agreed to a two-year deal at Stade Rennais F.C. also of the French top tier. He made his debut on 9 October, starting in a 3–0 home win over Derby Breton rivals FC Nantes. In January, he had ankle surgery.

Xeka left Roazhon Park by mutual consent on 10 August 2023, with only nine matches to his name.

=== Later career ===
On 1 May 2024, Al Sadd SC of the Qatar Stars League signed Xeka as a replacement for the injured Guilherme Torres. On 15 August, having made no appearances, he moved to G.D. Estoril Praia on a one-year contract.

Xeka then spent nearly one year on the sidelines, due to a serious knee injury contracted in April 2025.

== International career ==
Xeka earned one cap for Portugal at under-20 level on 5 February 2014, in a 2–0 friendly win over Slovakia under-21 in Marinha Grande. He played the final ten minutes as a substitute for Tomás Podstawski.

== Career statistics ==
As of match played 7 January 2023

Appearances and goals by club, season and competition
Club	Season	League			National cup (Note: Includes Taça de Portugal and Coupe de France)		League cup (Note: Includes Taça da Liga and Coupe de la Ligue)		Europe		Other		Total	
Club	Season	Division	Apps	Goals	Apps	Goals	Apps	Goals	Apps	Goals	Apps	Goals	Apps	Goals
Braga B	2013–14	Liga Portugal 2	17	1	—		—		—		—		17	1
Braga B	2016–17	Liga Portugal 2	11	1	—		—		—		—		11	1
Braga B	Total		28	2	—		—		—		—		28	2
Covilhã (loan)	2014–15	Liga Portugal 2	5	0	1	0	1	0	—		—		7	0
Covilhã (loan)	2015–16	Liga Portugal 2	34	0	0	0	0	0	—		—		34	0
Covilhã (loan)	Total		39	0	1	0	1	0	—		—		41	0
Braga	2016–17	Primeira Liga	11	0	3	0	4	0	—		—		18	0
Lille (loan)	2016–17	Ligue 1	13	1	2	0	—		—		—		15	1
Lille	2017–18	Ligue 1	1	0	0	0	0	0	0	0	—		1	0
Lille	2018–19	Ligue 1	27	2	2	0	1	0	0	0	—		30	2
Lille	2019–20	Ligue 1	17	0	3	0	2	0	3 (Note: Appearances in UEFA Champions League)	0	—		25	0
Lille	2020–21	Ligue 1	33	1	3	1	—		6 (Note: Appearances in UEFA Europa League)	0	—		42	2
Lille	2021–22	Ligue 1	23	3	0	0	—		7	0	1 (Note: Appearance in Trophée des Champions)	1	31	4
Lille	Total		114	7	10	1	3	0	16	0	1	1	144	9
Dijon (loan)	2017–18	Ligue 1	17	2	—		—		—		—		17	2
Lille II	2019–20	CFA 2	1	0	—		—		—		—		1	0
Rennes	2022–23	Ligue 1	8	0	1	0	—		—		—		9	0
Career total			218	11	14	1	8	0	16	0	1	1	257	13

== Honours ==
Lille

- Ligue 1: 2020–21
- Trophée des Champions: 2021
