= Jonathan Mutombo =

French footballer (born 2002)

Personal information
- Full name: Jonathan Mutombo Mawesi
- Date of birth: 27 August 2002 (age 24)
- Place of birth: Paris, France
- Height: 1.90 m (6 ft 3 in)
- Position: Centre-back

Team information
- Current team: Torreense
- Number: 45

Youth career
- –2014: SFC Neuilly-sur-Marne
- 2014–2021: Paris Saint-Germain
- 2020–2021: → Vitória de Guimarães (loan)
- 2021–2022: Vitória de Guimarães

Senior career*
Years	Team	Apps	(Gls)
2022–2024	Vitória de Guimarães B	44	(1)
2022	Vitória de Guimarães	0	(0)
2024–2026	Gil Vicente	18	(0)
2026–	Torreense	4	(1)
- * Club domestic league appearances and goals as of 5 September 2026

Jonathan Mutombo Mawesi (born 27 August 2002) is a French professional footballer who plays as a centre-back for Liga Portugal 2 club Torreense.

== Career ==
Mutombo joined the Paris Saint-Germain Youth Academy in 2014, eventually signing his first professional contract with the club on 29 May 2020, a deal until 30 June 2023. He joined Portuguese club Vitória de Guimarães in the 2020–21 season, and in 2022, made two Taça da Liga appearances, his only two for the club's first team. In the 2023–24 season, he played twenty-three matches for Vitória de Guimarães's reserve side and scored the goal that allowed the team to avoid relegation.

On 3 July 2024, Mutombo signed a three-year contract with Gil Vicente.

== Personal life ==
Born in France, he is of DR Congolese descent.
