= Léo Jardim =

Brazilian footballer (born 1995)

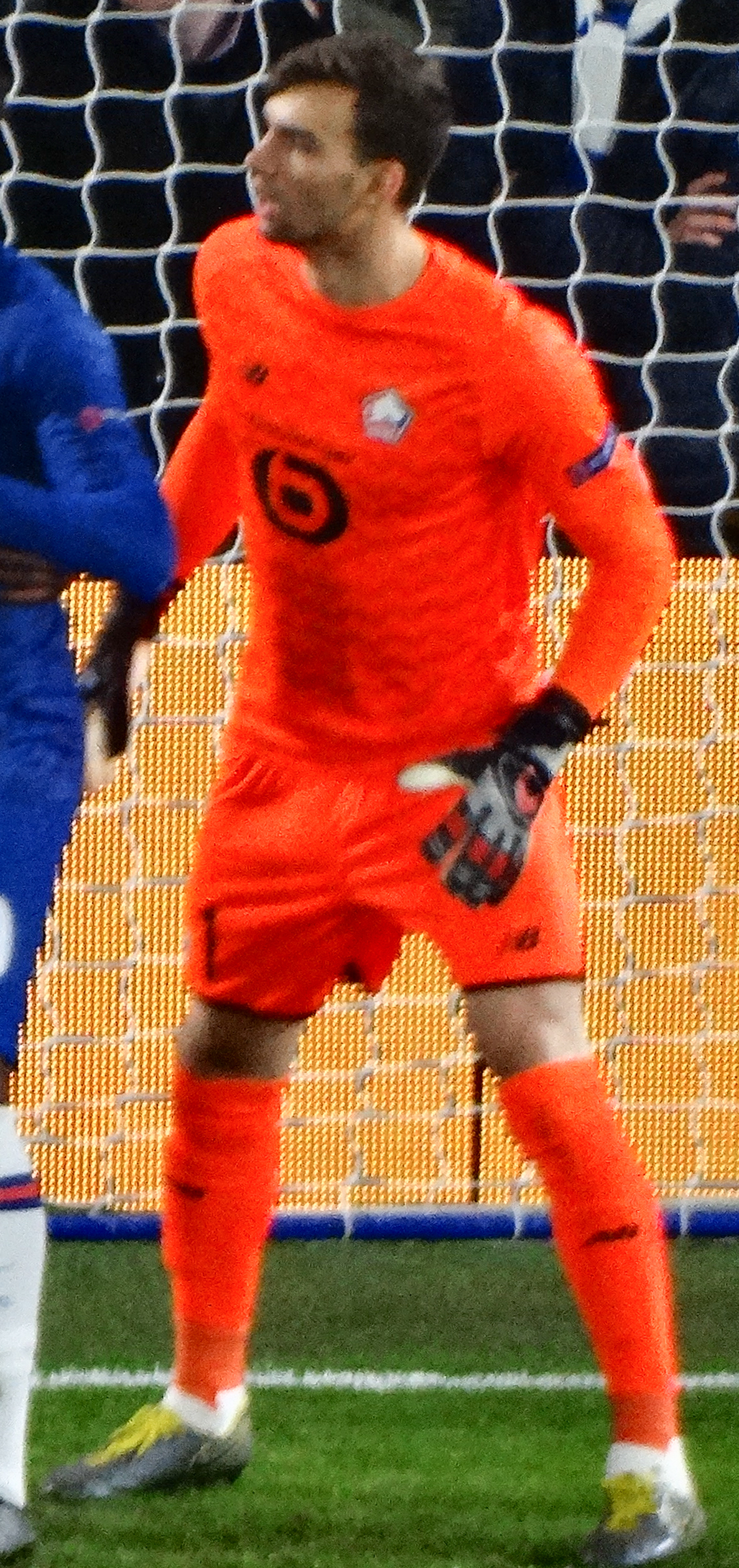
- Jardim playing for Lille in 2019

Personal information
- Full name: Leonardo César Jardim
- Date of birth: 20 March 1995 (age 31)
- Place of birth: Ribeirão Preto, Brazil
- Height: 1.88 m (6 ft 2 in)
- Position: Goalkeeper

Team information
- Current team: Vasco da Gama
- Number: 1

Youth career
- 2007–2012: Olé Brasil
- 2012–2013: Grêmio

Senior career*
Years	Team	Apps	(Gls)
2014–2019	Grêmio	11	(0)
2018–2019	→ Rio Ave (loan)	33	(0)
2019–2022	Lille B	2	(0)
2019–2022	Lille	23	(0)
2020–2021	→ Boavista (loan)	34	(0)
2023–	Vasco da Gama	175	(0)

International career^{‡}
2015–2016	Brazil U20	2	(0)
- * Club domestic league appearances and goals as of 19 September 2026 ‡ National team caps and goals as of 12 March 2024

Leonardo "Léo" César Jardim (born 20 March 1995) is a Brazilian professional footballer who plays as a goalkeeper for Vasco da Gama.

== Club career ==
On 13 July 2019, Jardim joined Ligue 1 club Lille on a five-year contract. Jardim made his club debut on 2 October 2019 in Lille's 2–1 home defeat to Chelsea in the UEFA Champions League group stage. He made a further three appearances for Lille that season, all coming in the Coupe de la Ligue where the club was eliminated by Lyon on penalties in the semi-finals.

On 1 September 2020, Jardim joined Primeira Liga side Boavista on loan for the 2020–21 season.

Following Mike Maignan's exit to A.C. Milan in July 2021, Jardim was elevated to Lille's first choice goalkeeper. On 1 August 2021, Jardim kept a clean sheet for Lille in their 1–0 victory over Paris Saint-Germain in the Trophée des Champions. He made his Ligue 1 debut for the club in a 3–3 draw with Metz on 8 August, followed by a 4–0 defeat against Nice. Such negative results left Léo on the bench for 21 matches. The Brazilian only played again, in the League, against Montpellier, in his team's 1–0 victory. This would be the first of seven consecutive clean sheets that the Brazilian would make in that League season. Finishing the season as first choice goalkeeper, Léo helped his team gain 10th place in the table.

At the end of the season, Léo Jardim, in 20 games, conceded 24 goals and had 9 clean sheets.

== International career ==
On 11 March 2024, Jardim was called up for the Brazil national football team for the first time for the March friendlies against England and Spain as a replacement for Ederson, who was struck out on injury.

== Personal life ==
Born in Brazil, Léo Jardim holds both Brazilian and Italian nationality.

Jardim has been married since 2017 to Carol Picolli. The couple has a son and a daughter.

== Career statistics ==
As of match played 19 September 2026

Appearances and goals by club, season and competition
Club	Season	League			State league		National cup		League cup		Continental		Other		Total	
Club	Season	Division	Apps	Goals	Apps	Goals	Apps	Goals	Apps	Goals	Apps	Goals	Apps	Goals	Apps	Goals
Grêmio	2016	Série A	3	0	0	0	1	0	—		0	0	—		4	0
Grêmio	2017	Série A	5	0	3	0	0	0	—		0	0	1	0	9	0
Grêmio	Total		8	0	3	0	1	0	—		0	0	1	0	13	0
Rio Ave (loan)	2018–19	Primeira Liga	33	0	—		3	0	2	0	—		—		38	0
Lille B	2019–20	National 2	1	0	—		—		—		—		—		1	0
Lille B	2021–22	National 3	1	0	—		—		—		—		—		1	0
Lille B	Total		2	0	—		—		—		—		—		2	0
Lille	2019–20	Ligue 1	0	0	—		0	0	3	0	1 (Note: Appearance(s) in the UEFA Champions League)	0	—		4	0
Lille	2021–22	Ligue 1	17	0	—		0	0	—		2	0	1 (Note: Appearance in the Trophée des Champions)	0	20	0
Lille	2022–23	Ligue 1	6	0	—		0	0	—		—		—		6	0
Lille	Total		23	0	—		0	0	3	0	3	0	1	0	30	0
Boavista (loan)	2020–21	Primeira Liga	34	0	—		1	0	0	0	—		—		35	0
Vasco da Gama	2023	Série A	38	0	7	0	2	0	—		—		—		47	0
Vasco da Gama	2024	Série A	38	0	11	0	10	0	—		—		—		59	0
Vasco da Gama	2025	Série A	36	0	10	0	12	0	—		8	0	—		66	0
Vasco da Gama	2026	Série A	27	0	8	0	6	0	—		10	0	—		51	0
Vasco da Gama	Total		139	0	36	0	30	0	—		18	0	—		223	0
Career total			239	0	39	0	35	0	5	0	21	0	2	0	341	0

== Honours ==
Grêmio

- Copa do Brasil: 2016

Lille

- Trophée des Champions: 2021
