= Denis Franchi =

Italian footballer (born 2002)

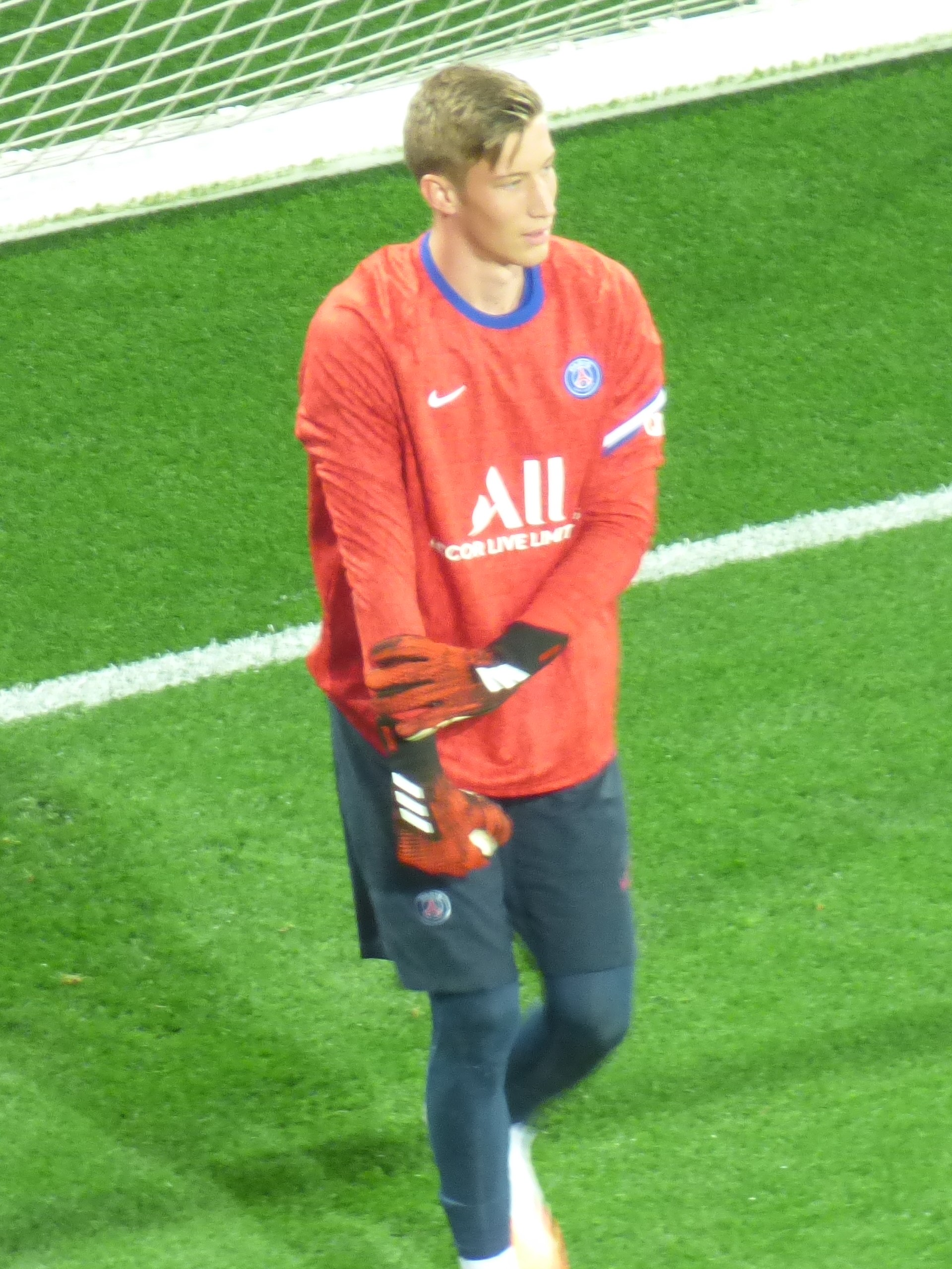
- Franchi with Paris Saint-Germain in 2020

Personal information
- Date of birth: 22 October 2002 (age 24)
- Place of birth: San Vito al Tagliamento, Italy
- Height: 1.89 m (6 ft 2 in)
- Position: Goalkeeper

Team information
- Current team: Potenza
- Number: 22

Youth career
- ACD Pravisdomini
- Opitergina
- 2014–2019: ASD Prata Falchi Visinale
- 2018–2019: → Udinese (loan)
- 2019–2021: Paris Saint-Germain

Senior career*
Years	Team	Apps	(Gls)
2021–2022	Paris Saint-Germain	0	(0)
2021–2022	Paris Saint-Germain B	5	(0)
2022–2024	Burnley	0	(0)
2024–2026	Ternana	1	(0)
2025	→ Pro Vercelli (loan)	12	(0)
2026	→ Potenza (loan)	3	(0)
2026–	Potenza	0	(0)

International career
2022	Italy U20	1	(0)
- * Club domestic league appearances and goals as of 1 May 2026

Denis Franchi (born 22 October 2002) is an Italian professional footballer who plays as a goalkeeper for Serie C Group C club Potenza.

== Career ==
The first club that Franchi joined in his career was ACD Pravisdomini. He also went on to play for U.S. Opitergina before joining ASD Prata Falchi Visinale. From 2018 to 2019, Franchi was on loan at Udinese. He joined the Paris Saint-Germain Academy in July 2019. On 30 November 2020, Franchi signed his first professional contract with Paris Saint-Germain, a deal that would last until 2023.

On 26 August 2022, Franchi signed for EFL Championship club Burnley on a three-year contract.

On 1 February 2024, Franchi signed for Serie B club Ternana on a three-and-a-half-year contract.

== Personal life ==
Born in San Vito al Tagliamento, Franchi originates from Pordenone in Italy's northeast. He is a supporter of AC Milan.
