= Tidjany Touré =

French footballer (born 2002)

Personal information
- Full name: Tidjany Chabrol Touré
- Date of birth: 15 July 2002 (age 24)
- Place of birth: Sarcelles, France
- Height: 1.81 m (5 ft 11 in)
- Position: Winger

Team information
- Current team: Gil Vicente
- Number: 7

Youth career
- 2014–2021: Paris Saint-Germain

Senior career*
Years	Team	Apps	(Gls)
2021–2022	Paris Saint-Germain	0	(0)
2022–2024	Feyenoord	0	(0)
2023	→ Dordrecht (loan)	14	(6)
2023–2024	→ Gil Vicente (loan)	28	(3)
2024–	Gil Vicente	36	(1)
- * Club domestic league appearances and goals as of 25 May 2026

Tidjany Chabrol Touré (born 15 July 2002) is a French professional footballer who plays as a winger for Primeira Liga club Gil Vicente.

== Career ==
From Sarcelles, Touré joined the Paris Saint-Germain youth academy in 2014. He signed his first professional contract with the club on 30 November 2018. On 1 September 2022, he left PSG for Dutch side Feyenoord, signing a two-year contract with the option to extend.

On 31 January 2023, Touré joined Dordrecht on a six-month loan from Feyenoord. He scored twice on his Dordrecht debut, in a 4–0 Eerste Divisie win over FC Eindhoven.

On 25 July 2023, Touré joined Portuguese club Gil Vicente on loan with an option to buy. On 24 May 2024, Gil Vicente exercised the option and signed a three-year contract with Touré.

== Style of play ==
Touré has been described as able to play across the attacking frontline, be it from either flank or starting centrally.

== Personal life ==
Touré is French-Ivorian.
