= Kenny Nagera =

French footballer (born 2002)

Personal information
- Full name: Kenny Karl Nagera
- Date of birth: 21 February 2002 (age 24)
- Place of birth: Argenteuil, France
- Height: 1.77 m (5 ft 10 in)
- Position: Forward

Team information
- Current team: Rodez
- Number: 9

Youth career
- 2008–2015: AF Épinay-sur-Seine
- 2015–2021: Paris Saint-Germain

Senior career*
Years	Team	Apps	(Gls)
2021–2023	Paris Saint-Germain	1	(0)
2021–2022	→ Bastia (loan)	6	(0)
2022	→ Avranches (loan)	12	(0)
2022	→ Avranches B (loan)	2	(0)
2022–2023	→ Lorient B (loan)	24	(7)
2023–2024	Differdange 03	25	(10)
2024–2025	RAAL La Louvière	21	(3)
2025–	Rodez	34	(4)
- * Club domestic league appearances and goals as of 11 May 2026

Kenny Karl Nagera (born 21 February 2002) is a French professional footballer who plays as a forward for Ligue 2 club Rodez.

== Career ==
Nagera began his footballing career at the Académie de Football d'Épinay-sur-Seine. He joined the Paris Saint-Germain Academy in 2015. On 29 June 2020, he signed his first professional contract with Paris Saint-Germain (PSG), tying him to the club until 2023. On 10 April 2021, Nagera made his professional debut for PSG, coming on as a substitute for Kylian Mbappé in a 4–1 win over Strasbourg. On 18 June, he signed a contract extension with the club that would extend his contract until 2025.

On 3 August 2021, Nagera signed for Ligue 2 club Bastia on loan until the end of the season. However, after having made only six appearances for the club, his loan in Corsica was cut short; on 17 January 2022, he joined Championnat National side Avranches on loan until the end of the season. On 30 August 2022, Nagera was loaned to Lorient, joining the club's reserve side in the Championnat National 2. After returning to PSG, he was released from his contract on 5 September 2023.

Nagera joined Luxembourgish club Differdange 03 after leaving PSG. He made his debut for the side in a 2–2 draw against UNA Strassen, scoring his team's second goal of the match.

On 7 August 2025, Nagera signed a three-season contract with Rodez in Ligue 2.

== Personal life ==
Nagera is of Guadeloupean and French Guianese descent. His brother Kemryk is also a professional footballer.

== Career statistics ==
As of 11 August 2024

Appearances and goals by club, season and competition
Club	Season	League			Cup		Other		Total	
Club	Season	Division	Apps	Goals	Apps	Goals	Apps	Goals	Apps	Goals
Paris Saint-Germain	2020–21	Ligue 1	1	0	0	0	0	0	1	0
Bastia (loan)	2021–22	Ligue 2	6	0	0	0	—		6	0
Avranches (loan)	2021–22	Championnat National	12	0	0	0	—		12	0
Avranches B (loan)	2021–22	Championnat National 3	2	0	—		—		2	0
Lorient B (loan)	2022–23	Championnat National 2	24	7	—		—		24	7
Differdange 03	2023–24	Luxembourg National Division	25	10	0	0	0	0	25	10
RAAL La Louvière	2024–25	Challenger Pro League	0	0	0	0	—		0	0
Career total			70	17	0	0	0	0	70	17
