= 2022–23 Paris Saint-Germain FC season =

53rd season in existence of Paris Saint-Germain

Paris Saint-Germain
2022–23 season
- President: Nasser Al-Khelaifi
- Head coach: Christophe Galtier
- Stadium: Parc des Princes
- Ligue 1: 1st
- Coupe de France: Round of 16
- Trophée des Champions: Winners
- UEFA Champions League: Round of 16
- Top goalscorer: League: Kylian Mbappé (29); All: Kylian Mbappé (41)
- Highest home attendance: 47,415 vs Juventus, UEFA Champions League, 6 September 2022
- Average home league attendance: 46,000
- Biggest win: 7–0 vs US Pays de Cassel, Coupe de France, 23 January 2023
- Biggest defeat: 1–3 vs Lens, Ligue 1, 1 January 2023; 1–3 vs Monaco, Ligue 1, 11 February 2023; 0–2 vs Bayern Munich, UEFA Champions League, 8 March 2023; 0–2 vs Rennes, Ligue 1, 19 March 2023; 1–3 vs Lorient, Ligue 1, 30 April 2023
Home colours	Away colours	Third colours

The 2022–23 season was the 53rd season in the existence of Paris Saint-Germain F.C. and the club's 49th consecutive season in the top flight of French football. In addition to the domestic league, they participated in the season's editions of the Coupe de France and the UEFA Champions League, and secured an eleventh Trophée des Champions at the start of the season.

This was the first season since 2014–15 without Angel Di Maria, who departed to Juventus and without Alphonse Areola since 2009–10, who departed to West Ham United.

== Kits ==
Home	Home alt.	Home alt. 2	Away	Away alt. 2	Third	Third alt.	Fourth
Goalkeeper 1	Goalkeeper 2	Goalkeeper 3

== Season summary ==
=== Pre-season ===
Ahead of the 2022–23 season, it was announced that Leonardo Araújo, sporting director, had been dismissed, and that star forward Kylian Mbappé had signed a contract extension, choosing to remain at the club. The season is the first without the services of Ángel Di María at Paris Saint-Germain since the 2014–15 season. On 31 May, PSG completed the permanent transfer Portuguese left-back Nuno Mendes, who signed with the club until 30 June 2026. On 10 June 2022, Luís Campos joined the club as Football Advisor, being responsible for recruitment of new players. Campos's first signing of the summer was Portuguese midfielder Vitinha, in a transfer worth €41.5 million. On 5 July 2022, Christophe Galtier replaced Mauricio Pochettino as the club's head coach, a signing which lent a lot of credibility to the club/s new policy of no "bling-bling". This was stated by the club's president at a presentation for the new head coach.

On 17 July the club confirmed the signing of Hugo Ekitike initially on a loan deal, which included a clause for a permanent transfer to the club. The signing was quickly followed by reports that club were now free to pursue alternative targets in a focused manner, specifically reaching out for players from the Paris region. Though initial reports were skeptical, the club quickly proved this to be true by signing Nordi Mukiele from RB Leipzig. In continuation of the club's new transfer policy, the club then launched a bid for Renato Sanches who played for Lille. After a few weeks of negotiations the player was then signed on 4 August.

== Players ==
=== First-team squad ===
As of 31 January 2023

Note: Flags indicate national team as defined under FIFA eligibility rules; some limited exceptions apply. Players may hold more than one non-FIFA nationality.

No.	Pos.	Nation	Player
2	DF	MAR	Achraf Hakimi
3	DF	FRA	Presnel Kimpembe (vice-captain)
4	DF	ESP	Sergio Ramos
5	DF	BRA	Marquinhos (captain)
6	MF	ITA	Marco Verratti
7	FW	FRA	Kylian Mbappé
8	MF	ESP	Fabián Ruiz
10	FW	BRA	Neymar
14	DF	ESP	Juan Bernat
15	MF	POR	Danilo Pereira
16	GK	ESP	Sergio Rico

No.	Pos.	Nation	Player
17	MF	POR	Vitinha
18	MF	POR	Renato Sanches
25	DF	POR	Nuno Mendes
26	DF	FRA	Nordi Mukiele
28	MF	ESP	Carlos Soler
29	DF	FRA	Timothée Pembélé
30	FW	ARG	Lionel Messi
44	FW	FRA	Hugo Ekitike (on loan from Reims)
90	GK	FRA	Alexandre Letellier
99	GK	ITA	Gianluigi Donnarumma

=== Elite group ===
The elite group consists of players from the academy who train with the first team.

Note: Flags indicate national team as defined under FIFA eligibility rules; some limited exceptions apply. Players may hold more than one non-FIFA nationality.

No.	Pos.	Nation	Player
31	DF	FRA	El Chadaille Bitshiabu
33	MF	FRA	Warren Zaïre-Emery
35	MF	ESP	Ismaël Gharbi

No.	Pos.	Nation	Player
37	FW	FRA	Ilyes Housni
70	GK	FRA	Lucas Lavallée

=== Out on loan ===
Note: Flags indicate national team as defined under FIFA eligibility rules; some limited exceptions apply. Players may hold more than one non-FIFA nationality.

No.	Pos.	Nation	Player
—	GK	CRC	Keylor Navas (at Nottingham Forest until 30 June 2023)
—	GK	MAD	Mathyas Randriamamy (at Sète until 30 June 2023)
—	DF	FRA	Colin Dagba (at Strasbourg until 30 June 2023)
—	DF	SEN	Abdou Diallo (at RB Leipzig until 30 June 2023)
—	DF	FRA	Layvin Kurzawa (at Fulham until 30 June 2023)
—	MF	COM	Anfane Ahamada (at Martigues until 30 June 2023)
—	MF	FRA	Éric Junior Dina Ebimbe (at Eintracht Frankfurt until 30 June 2023)
—	MF	GER	Julian Draxler (at Benfica until 30 June 2023)

No.	Pos.	Nation	Player
—	MF	FRA	Ayman Kari (at Lorient until 30 June 2023)
—	MF	FRA	Edouard Michut (at Sunderland until 30 June 2023)
—	MF	ARG	Leandro Paredes (at Juventus until 30 June 2023)
—	MF	NED	Georginio Wijnaldum (at Roma until 30 June 2023)
—	FW	FRA	Djeidi Gassama (at Eupen until 30 June 2023)
—	FW	ARG	Mauro Icardi (at Galatasaray until 30 June 2023)
—	FW	FRA	Kenny Nagera (at Lorient until 30 June 2023)
—	FW	FRA	Samuel Noireau-Dauriat (at C'Chartres until 30 June 2023)

=== Other players under contract ===
Note: Flags indicate national team as defined under FIFA eligibility rules; some limited exceptions apply. Players may hold more than one non-FIFA nationality.

No.	Pos.	Nation	Player
—	DF	FRA	Moutanabi Bodiang

== Transfers ==
=== In ===
No.	Pos.	Player	Transferred from	Fee	Date	Source
25	DF	(Portugal) Nuno Mendes	(Portugal) Sporting CP	€38 million	10 June 2022	
17	MF	(Portugal) Vitinha	(Portugal) Porto	€41.5 million	30 June 2022	
44	FW	(France) Hugo Ekitike	(France) Reims	Loan (Note: Includes an option to sign permanently for €28.5 million, with an additional €6.5 million in potential bonuses. Some sources claim the buy option is mandatory.)	16 July 2022	
26	DF	(France) Nordi Mukiele	(Germany) RB Leipzig	€10 million (Note: Up to €6 million in bonuses.)	26 July 2022	
18	MF	(Portugal) Renato Sanches	(France) Lille	€10 million (Note: Up to €3 million in bonuses.)	4 August 2022	
8	MF	(Spain) Fabián Ruiz	(Italy) Napoli	€21.5 million	30 August 2022	
28	MF	(Spain) Carlos Soler	(Spain) Valencia	€18 million	1 September 2022	

=== Out ===
Pos.	Player	Transferred to	Fee	Date	Source
GK	(Poland) Marcin Bułka	(France) Nice	€2 million	10 June 2022	
GK	(France) Alphonse Areola	(England) West Ham United	€12 million	27 June 2022	
MF	(Netherlands) Xavi Simons	(Netherlands) PSV	Free	1 July 2022	
MF	(Argentina) Ángel Di María	Released (Note: On 8 July 2022, Di María joined Juventus.)	Free	1 July 2022	
MF	(Algeria) Massinissa Oufella	Released	Free	1 July 2022	
FW	(France) Alexandre Fressange	Released	Free	1 July 2022	
DF	(France) Colin Dagba	(France) Strasbourg	Loan	6 July 2022	
MF	(France) Daouda Weidmann	(Italy) Torino	Undisclosed	3 August 2022	
MF	(Netherlands) Georginio Wijnaldum	(Italy) Roma	Loan (Note: Includes an option to sign permanently for €8 million.)	5 August 2022	
DF	(France) Thierno Baldé	(France) Troyes	€3 million	9 August 2022	
FW	(France) Arnaud Kalimuendo	(France) Rennes	€25 million (Note: Bonuses included.)	11 August 2022	
DF	(Germany) Thilo Kehrer	(England) West Ham United	€12 million (Note: Up to €4 million in bonuses.)	17 August 2022	
MF	(France) Nathan Bitumazala	(Belgium) Eupen	Undisclosed	17 August 2022	
MF	(France) Éric Junior Dina Ebimbe	(Germany) Eintracht Frankfurt	Loan (Note: Includes an option to sign permanently for €6.5 million, reportedly mandatory if Eintracht Frankfurt does not suffer relegation.)	21 August 2022	
GK	(Italy) Denis Franchi	(England) Burnley	Undisclosed	26 August 2022	
DF	(France) Moutanabi Bodiang	(France) Le Puy	Loan	27 August 2022	
MF	(Spain) Ander Herrera	(Spain) Athletic Bilbao	Loan (Note: Includes an option to sign permanently.)	27 August 2022	
FW	(France) Kenny Nagera	(France) Lorient B	Loan	30 August 2022	
MF	(France) Edouard Michut	(England) Sunderland	Loan (Note: Includes an option to sign permanently for €5 million.)	31 August 2022	
MF	(Argentina) Leandro Paredes	(Italy) Juventus	Loan (Note: Includes an option to sign permanently for €15 million, with an additional €5 million in potential bonuses.)	31 August 2022	
GK	(France) Garissone Innocent	(Belgium) Eupen	Undisclosed	1 September 2022	
DF	(Senegal) Abdou Diallo	(Germany) RB Leipzig	Loan (Note: Includes an option to sign permanently for €25 million.)	1 September 2022	
DF	(France) Layvin Kurzawa	(England) Fulham	Loan	1 September 2022	
MF	(Comoros) Anfane Ahamada	(France) Martigues	Loan	1 September 2022	
MF	(Germany) Julian Draxler	(Portugal) Benfica	Loan	1 September 2022	
MF	(Senegal) Idrissa Gueye	(England) Everton	€2.3 million	1 September 2022	
MF	(France) Tidjany Touré	(Netherlands) Feyenoord	Undisclosed	1 September 2022	
MF	(Brazil) Rafinha	(Qatar) Al-Arabi	Free	3 September 2022	
DF	(Morocco) Kaïs Najeh	(Qatar) Al-Rayyan	Undisclosed	4 September 2022	
DF	(France) Teddy Alloh	(Belgium) Eupen	Undisclosed	6 September 2022	
FW	(France) Djeidi Gassama	(Belgium) Eupen	Loan	6 September 2022	
FW	(Argentina) Mauro Icardi	(Turkey) Galatasaray	Loan	8 September 2022	
FW	(France) Sekou Yansané	(Qatar) Al Ahli	Undisclosed	10 September 2022	
FW	(France) Samuel Noireau-Dauriat	(France) C'Chartres	Loan	24 September 2022	
MF	(Spain) Pablo Sarabia	(England) Wolverhampton Wanderers	€5 million (Note: Up to €2 million in bonuses.)	17 January 2023	
GK	(Madagascar) Mathyas Randriamamy	(France) Sète	Loan	24 January 2023	
GK	(Costa Rica) Keylor Navas	(England) Nottingham Forest	Loan	31 January 2023	
MF	(Spain) Ander Herrera	(Spain) Athletic Bilbao	Undisclosed	31 January 2023	
MF	(France) Ayman Kari	(France) Lorient	Loan (Note: Five-month loan with an option for a one-year extension. Includes a reported option to sign permanently, with Paris Saint-Germain reportedly having a buy-back clause.)	31 January 2023	

== Pre-season and friendlies ==
Win Draw Loss Fixtures

PSG started the pre-season on 4 July. The club returned to training on 7 December, with the participation of players who were not at the 2022 FIFA World Cup.

15 July 2022 Friendly	Paris Saint-Germain	2–0	Quevilly-Rouen	Saint-Germain-en-Laye, France
17:00 CEST (UTC+2)	Ramos 33' (pen.); Gassama 54'	Report	Tégar (yellow card) 87'	Stadium: Camp des Loges

20 July 2022 Friendly	Paris Saint-Germain	2–1	Kawasaki Frontale	Tokyo, Japan
19:30 JST (UTC+9)	Messi 32'; Kalimuendo 58'	Report	Yamamura 84'	Stadium: Japan National Stadium; Referee: Yusuke Araki (Japan)

23 July 2022 Friendly	Paris Saint-Germain	3–0	Urawa Red Diamonds	Saitama, Japan
19:00 JST (UTC+9)	Sarabia 16'; Mbappé 35'; Kalimuendo 76'	Report	Shibato (yellow card) 80'	Stadium: Saitama Stadium 2002; Attendance: 65,000; Referee: Ryuji Sato (Japan)

25 July 2022 Friendly	Paris Saint-Germain	6–2	Gamba Osaka	Osaka, Japan
19:00 JST (UTC+9)	Sarabia 28'; Neymar 32' (pen.), 60'; Mendes 37'; Messi 39'; Mbappé 86' (pen.)	Report	Kurokawa 33'; Yamami 70'	Stadium: Panasonic Stadium Suita; Referee: Futoshi Nakamura (Japan)

16 December 2022 Friendly	Paris Saint-Germain	2–1	Paris FC	Saint-Germain-en-Laye, France
10:00 CET (UTC+1)	Mukiele 16'; Gharbi 52'	Report	El Hannach 61' (o.g.)	Stadium: Camp des Loges; Referee: Marc Bollengier

21 December 2022 Friendly	Paris Saint-Germain	3–1	Quevilly-Rouen	Saint-Germain-en-Laye, France
12:00 CET (UTC+1)	Gharbi 14'; Housni 30', 51'; Verratti (yellow card) 53'	Report	Diedhiou 78'	Stadium: Camp des Loges; Referee: Willy Delajod

19 January 2023 Riyadh Season Cup	Riyadh XI	4–5	Paris Saint-Germain	Riyadh, Saudi Arabia
20:05 SAST (UTC+3)	Ronaldo 34' (pen.), 45+6'; Jang 56'; Al-Bulaihi (yellow card) 59'; Talisca 90+4'	Report	Messi 3'; Navas (yellow card) 33'; Bernat (red card) 39'; Marquinhos 43'; Neymar (penalty missed) 45+3'; Ramos 53'; Mbappé 60' (pen.); Ekitike 78'	Stadium: King Fahd International Stadium; Attendance: 68,000; Referee: Abdulrahman Al-Jassim (Qatar)

== Competitions ==
=== Overall record ===
Competition	First match	Last match	Starting round	Final position	Record							
Competition	First match	Last match	Starting round	Final position	Pld	W	D	L	GF	GA	GD	Win %
Ligue 1	6 August 2022	3 June 2023	Matchday 1	Winners	38	27	4	7	89	40	+49	71.05
Coupe de France	6 January 2023	8 February 2023	Round of 64	Round of 16	3	2	0	1	11	3	+8	66.67
Trophée des Champions	31 July 2022		Final	Winners	1	1	0	0	4	0	+4	100.00
UEFA Champions League	6 September 2022	8 March 2023	Group stage	Round of 16	8	4	2	2	16	10	+6	50.00
Total					50	34	6	10	120	53	+67	68.00

Source: Soccerway

=== Ligue 1 ===
==== League table ====
Pos	Team	Pld	W	D	L	GF	GA	GD	Pts	Qualification or relegation
1	Paris Saint-Germain (C)	38	27	4	7	89	40	+49	85	Qualification for the Champions League group stage
2	Lens	38	25	9	4	68	29	+39	84	Qualification for the Champions League group stage
3	Marseille	38	22	7	9	67	40	+27	73	Qualification for the Champions League third qualifying round
4	Rennes	38	21	5	12	69	39	+30	68	Qualification for the Europa League group stage
5	Lille	38	19	10	9	65	44	+21	67	Qualification for the Europa Conference League play-off round

Source: Ligue 1
Rules for classification: 1) Points; 2) Goal difference; 3) Head-to-head points; 4) Head-to-head goal difference; 5) Head-to-head goals scored; 6) Head-to-head away goals scored; 7) Goals scored; 8) Away goals scored; 9) Fair-play points (Note: Head-to-head record is used only after all the matches between the teams in question have been played).
(C) Champions

==== Results summary ====
Overall								Home						Away					
Pld	W	D	L	GF	GA	GD	Pts	W	D	L	GF	GA	GD	W	D	L	GF	GA	GD
38	27	4	7	89	40	+49	85	13	2	4	45	25	+20	14	2	3	44	15	+29

Source: Ligue 1

==== Results by round ====
Round	1	2	3	4	5	6	7	8	9	10	11	12	13	14	15	16	17	18	19	20	21	22	23	24	25	26	27	28	29	30	31	32	33	34	35	36	37	38
Ground	A	H	A	H	A	A	H	A	H	A	H	A	H	A	H	H	A	H	A	H	A	H	A	H	A	H	A	H	H	A	H	A	H	A	H	A	A	H
Result	W	W	W	D	W	W	W	W	W	D	W	W	W	W	W	W	L	W	L	D	W	W	L	W	W	W	W	L	L	W	W	W	L	W	W	W	D	L
Position	1	1	1	1	1	1	1	1	1	1	1	1	1	1	1	1	1	1	1	1	1	1	1	1	1	1	1	1	1	1	1	1	1	1	1	1	1	1

Source: Ligue 1
A = Away; H = Home; W = Win; D = Draw; L = Loss

==== Matches ====
The league fixtures were announced on 17 June 2022.

6 August 2022 1	Clermont	0–5	Paris Saint-Germain	Clermont-Ferrand
21:00 CEST (UTC+2)	Allevinah (yellow card) 38'; Gonalons (yellow card) 67'	Report	Neymar 9'; Vitinha (yellow card) 13'; Hakimi 26'; Marquinhos 38'; Messi 80', 86'	Stadium: Stade Gabriel Montpied; Attendance: 12,203; Referee: Jérémy Stinat

13 August 2022 2	Paris Saint-Germain	5–2	Montpellier	Paris
21:00 CEST (UTC+2)	Mbappé (penalty missed) 23', 69'; Sacko 39' (o.g.); Neymar 43' (pen.), 51'; Kimpembe (yellow card) 60'; Vitinha (yellow card) 66'; Sanches 87'	Report	Khazri 58'; Wahi (yellow card) 63'; Tchato 90+2'	Stadium: Parc des Princes; Attendance: 46,000; Referee: Willy Delajod

21 August 2022 3	Lille	1–7	Paris Saint-Germain	Villeneuve-d'Ascq
20:45 CEST (UTC+2)	André (yellow card) 39'; Bamba 54'; David (yellow card) 83'	Report	Mbappé 1', 66', 87'; Messi 27'; Ramos (yellow card) 34'; Hakimi 39'; Neymar 43', 52'	Stadium: Stade Pierre-Mauroy; Attendance: 47,526; Referee: Clément Turpin

28 August 2022 4	Paris Saint-Germain	1–1	Monaco	Paris
20:45 CEST (UTC+2)	Neymar (yellow card) 5', (goal) 70' (pen.); Kimpembe (yellow card) 77'; Verratti (yellow card) 86'; Hakimi (yellow card) 90+5'	Report	Volland 20'; Akliouche (yellow card) 40'; Camara (yellow card) 55'; Badiashile (yellow card) 90+1'; Caio Henrique (yellow card) 90+5'	Stadium: Parc des Princes; Attendance: 46,000; Referee: Benoît Bastien

31 August 2022 5	Toulouse	0–3	Paris Saint-Germain	Toulouse
21:00 CEST (UTC+2)	Ratão (yellow card) 64'	Report	Neymar 37'; Mbappé 50'; Bernat 90'	Stadium: Stadium de Toulouse; Attendance: 33,150; Referee: Hakim Ben El Hadj

3 September 2022 6	Nantes	0–3	Paris Saint-Germain	Nantes
21:00 CEST (UTC+2)	Fábio (red card) 24'; Pallois (yellow card) 33'	Report	Mbappé 18', 54', (yellow card) 57'; Bernat (yellow card) 45+2'; Verratti (yellow card) 50'; Mendes 68'; Ramos (yellow card) 69'	Stadium: Stade de la Beaujoire; Attendance: 34,406; Referee: Pierre Gaillouste

10 September 2022 7	Paris Saint-Germain	1–0	Brest	Paris
17:00 CEST (UTC+2)	Neymar 30', (yellow card) 40'; Kimpembe (yellow card) 69'; Pereira (yellow card) 77'; Mendes (yellow card) 80'	Report	Lees-Melou (yellow card) 25'; Chardonnet (yellow card) 46'; Slimani (penalty missed) 70'	Stadium: Parc des Princes; Attendance: 45,000; Referee: Jérémie Pignard

18 September 2022 8	Lyon	0–1	Paris Saint-Germain	Décines-Charpieu
20:45 CEST (UTC+2)		Report	Messi 5'; Verratti (yellow card) 39'; Donnarumma (yellow card) 90+3'	Stadium: Parc Olympique Lyonnais; Attendance: 58,230; Referee: François Letexier

1 October 2022 9	Paris Saint-Germain	2–1	Nice	Paris
21:00 CEST (UTC+2)	Messi 28'; Mbappé 83'; Sarabia (yellow card) 90+1'	Report	Dante (yellow card) 27'; Laborde 47'	Stadium: Parc des Princes; Attendance: 47,000; Referee: Jérôme Brisard

8 October 2022 10	Reims	0–0	Paris Saint-Germain	Reims
21:00 CEST (UTC+2)	Munetsi (yellow card) 39'; Gravillon (yellow card) 90'; Locko (yellow card) 90+4'	Report	Ramos (yellow card) 41', (red card) 41'; Verratti (yellow card) 42'; Hakimi (yellow card) 90'; Neymar (yellow card) 90+2'; Mbappé (yellow card) 90+2'	Stadium: Stade Auguste-Delaune; Attendance: 20,543; Referee: Pierre Gaillouste

16 October 2022 11	Paris Saint-Germain	1–0	Marseille	Paris
20:45 CEST (UTC+2)	Neymar 45+2'; Marquinhos (yellow card) 73'	Report	Gigot (red card) 72'	Stadium: Parc des Princes; Attendance: 47,000; Referee: Clément Turpin

21 October 2022 12	Ajaccio	0–3	Paris Saint-Germain	Ajaccio
21:00 CEST (UTC+2)		Report	Verratti (yellow card) 23'; Mbappé 24', 82'; Messi 78'	Stadium: Stade François Coty; Attendance: 10,000; Referee: Johan Hamel

29 October 2022 13	Paris Saint-Germain	4–3	Troyes	Paris
17:00 CEST (UTC+2)	Soler 24'; Messi 55'; Neymar 62'; Mbappé 77' (pen.)	Report	M. Baldé 3', 52'; Porozo (yellow card) 59'; Gallon (yellow card) 75'; Lopes (yellow card) 78'; Palaversa 88'	Stadium: Parc des Princes; Attendance: 46,359; Referee: Eric Wattellier

6 November 2022 14	Lorient	1–2	Paris Saint-Germain	Lorient
13:00 CET (UTC+1)	Moffi 53'; Innocent (yellow card) 63'	Report	Neymar 9'; Pereira 81'	Stadium: Stade du Moustoir; Attendance: 16,778; Referee: Benoît Bastien

13 November 2022 15	Paris Saint-Germain	5–0	Auxerre	Paris
13:00 CET (UTC+1)	Mbappé 11'; Soler 51'; Hakimi 57'; Sanches 81'; Ekitike 84'	Report		Stadium: Parc des Princes; Attendance: 45,000; Referee: Thomas Léonard

28 December 2022 16	Paris Saint-Germain	2–1	Strasbourg	Paris
21:00 CET (UTC+1)	Marquinhos 14'; Verratti (yellow card) 49'; Neymar (yellow card) 60' (yellow-red card) 61'; Mbappé 90+5' (pen.), (yellow card) 90+5'	Report	Nyamsi (yellow card) 48'; Marquinhos 50' (o.g.)	Stadium: Parc des Princes; Attendance: 47,000; Referee: Clément Turpin

1 January 2023 17	Lens	3–1	Paris Saint-Germain	Lens
20:45 CET (UTC+1)	Frankowski 4'; Openda 27'; Abdul Samed (yellow card) 40'; Gradit (yellow card) 45'; Claude-Maurice 46'	Report	Ekitike 7'; Hakimi (yellow card) 45'; Gharbi (yellow card) 87'; Verratti (yellow card) 90'	Stadium: Stade Bollaert-Delelis; Attendance: 38,047; Referee: Jérôme Brisard

11 January 2023 18	Paris Saint-Germain	2–0	Angers	Paris
21:00 CET (UTC+1)	Ekitike 5'; Messi 72'; Neymar (yellow card) 90+2'	Report	Capelle (yellow card) 53'; Blažič (yellow card) 89'	Stadium: Parc des Princes; Attendance: 47,000; Referee: Eric Wattellier

15 January 2023 19	Rennes	1–0	Paris Saint-Germain	Rennes
20:45 CET (UTC+1)	Traoré 64'	Report		Stadium: Roazhon Park; Attendance: 27,566; Referee: Benoît Bastien

29 January 2023 20	Paris Saint-Germain	1–1	Reims	Paris
20:45 CET (UTC+1)	Marquinhos (yellow card) 29'; Neymar 51'; Verratti (red card) 58'; Donnarumma (yellow card) 90+3'	Report	Ito (yellow card) 35'; Balogun 90+5'	Stadium: Parc des Princes; Attendance: 46,000; Referee: Ruddy Buquet

1 February 2023 21	Montpellier	1–3	Paris Saint-Germain	Montpellier
21:00 CET (UTC+1)	Jullien (yellow card) 7'; Nordin 89'	Report	Mbappé (penalty missed) 10'; Pereira (yellow card) 11'; Fabián 54'; Messi 71'; Zaïre-Emery 90+1'	Stadium: Stade de la Mosson; Attendance: 17,454; Referee: Jérémie Pignard

4 February 2023 22	Paris Saint-Germain	2–1	Toulouse	Paris
17:00 CET (UTC+1)	Bitshiabu (yellow card) 18'; Hakimi 38'; Mendes (yellow card) 45+2'; Messi 58'	Report	Van den Boomen 20'; Dejaegere (yellow card) 49'; Chaïbi (yellow card) 75'	Stadium: Parc des Princes; Attendance: 45,000; Referee: Bastien Dechepy

11 February 2023 23	Monaco	3–1	Paris Saint-Germain	Monaco
17:00 CET (UTC+1)	Golovin 4'; Ben Yedder 18', 45+2'	Report	Zaïre-Emery 39'; Hakimi (yellow card) 71'	Stadium: Stade Louis II; Attendance: 16,500; Referee: Clément Turpin

19 February 2023 24	Paris Saint-Germain	4–3	Lille	Paris
13:00 CET (UTC+1)	Mbappé 11', 87', (yellow card) 77'; Neymar 17'; Verratti (yellow card) 56'; Messi 90+5'	Report	Diakité 24', (yellow card) 45'; David 58' (pen.), (yellow card) 89'; Bamba (yellow card) 63', (goal) 69'; André (yellow card) 90+4'	Stadium: Parc des Princes; Attendance: 46,000; Referee: Willy Delajod

26 February 2023 25	Marseille	0–3	Paris Saint-Germain	Marseille
20:45 CET (UTC+1)		Report	Mbappé 25', 55'; Messi 29'	Stadium: Stade Vélodrome; Attendance: 65,894; Referee: Clément Turpin

4 March 2023 26	Paris Saint-Germain	4–2	Nantes	Paris
21:00 CET (UTC+1)	Messi 12'; Hadjam 17' (o.g.); Pereira 60'; Mbappé 90+2'	Report	Blas 31'; Ganago 38'; Hadjam (yellow card) 63'; Girotto (yellow card) 69'	Stadium: Parc des Princes; Attendance: 47,000; Referee: Jérémy Stinat

11 March 2023 27	Brest	1–2	Paris Saint-Germain	Brest
21:00 CEST (UTC+2)	Honorat 43'; Belkebla (yellow card) 86'	Report	Soler 37'; Mbappé (yellow card) 86', (goal) 90'	Stadium: Stade Francis-Le Blé; Attendance: 14,935; Referee: Marc Bollengier

19 March 2023 28	Paris Saint-Germain	0–2	Rennes	Paris
17:05 CEST (UTC+2)	Zaïre-Emery (yellow card) 80'	Report	Toko Ekambi 45'; Kalimuendo 48'; Wooh (yellow card) 52'	Stadium: Parc des Princes; Attendance: 47,000; Referee: Willy Delajod

2 April 2023 29	Paris Saint-Germain	0–1	Lyon	Paris
20:45 CEST (UTC+2)	Bitshiabu (yellow card) 12'; Donnarumma (yellow card) 36'; Sanches (yellow card) 42'	Report	Lacazette (penalty missed) 39'; Kumbedi (yellow card) 42'; Barcola 56', (yellow card) 90+3'; Tolisso (yellow card) 90+4'	Stadium: Parc des Princes; Attendance: 47,926; Referee: François Letexier

8 April 2023 30	Nice	0–2	Paris Saint-Germain	Nice
21:00 CEST (UTC+2)	Thuram (yellow card) 88'	Report	Messi 26'; Ramos 76'	Stadium: Allianz Riviera; Attendance: 34,456; Referee: Jérémie Pignard

15 April 2023 31	Paris Saint-Germain	3–1	Lens	Paris
21:00 CEST (UTC+2)	Mbappé 31'; Vitinha 37'; Messi 40'	Report	Abdul Samed (red card) 19'; Frankowski 60' (pen.)	Stadium: Parc des Princes; Attendance: 47,120; Referee: Willy Delajod

21 April 2023 32	Angers	1–2	Paris Saint-Germain	Angers
21:00 CEST (UTC+2)	Thioub 87'	Report	Mbappé 9', 26'	Stadium: Stade Raymond Kopa; Attendance: 16,914; Referee: Eric Wattelier

30 April 2023 33	Paris Saint-Germain	1–3	Lorient	Paris
17:05 CEST (UTC+2)	Hakimi (yellow card) 5' (yellow-red card) 20'; Mbappé 29'; Marquinhos (yellow card) 51'; Verratti (yellow card) 73'	Report	Le Fée 16', (yellow card) 52'; Innocent (yellow card) 32'; Yongwa 39'; Dieng (yellow card) 77', (goal) 88'	Stadium: Parc des Princes; Attendance: 41,454; Referee: Jérôme Brisard

7 May 2023 34	Troyes	1–3	Paris Saint-Germain	Troyes
20:45 CEST (UTC+2)	M. Baldé (yellow card) 45+2'; Chavalerin 83'	Report	Mbappé 8'; Vitinha 59'; Fabián 86'	Stadium: Stade de l'Aube; Attendance: 18,890; Referee: Ruddy Buquet

13 May 2023 35	Paris Saint-Germain	5–0	Ajaccio	Paris
21:00 CEST (UTC+2)	Fabián 22'; Hakimi 33', (red card) 77'; Mbappé 47', 54'; Youssouf 73' (o.g.); Marquinhos (yellow card) 77'	Report	Marchetti (yellow card) 77'; Mangani (red card) 77'	Stadium: Parc des Princes; Attendance: 47,926; Referee: Pierre Gaillouste

21 May 2023 36	Auxerre	1–2	Paris Saint-Germain	Auxerre
20:45 CEST (UTC+2)	Jubal (yellow card) 46'; Sinayoko 51'	Report	Mbappé 6', 8'	Stadium: Stade de l'Abbé-Deschamps; Attendance: 16,682; Referee: Benoît Bastien

27 May 2023 37	Strasbourg	1–1	Paris Saint-Germain	Strasbourg
21:00 CEST (UTC+2)	Diarra (yellow card) 23'; Gameiro 79'	Report	Vitinha (yellow card) 6'; Messi 59'; Verratti (yellow card) 75'	Stadium: Stade de la Meinau; Attendance: 25,828; Referee: Jérôme Brisard

3 June 2023 38	Paris Saint-Germain	2–3	Clermont	Paris
21:00 CEST (UTC+2)	Ramos 16'; Mbappé 21' (pen.), (yellow card) 28'; Pereira (yellow card) 76'	Report	Gastien 24'; Kyei (penalty missed) 37', 63'; Zeffane 45+1'; Wieteska (yellow card) 90+4'	Stadium: Parc des Princes; Attendance: 47,926; Referee: Thomas Léonard

=== Coupe de France ===
6 January 2023 Round of 64	Châteauroux	1–3	Paris Saint-Germain	Châteauroux
21:00 CET (UTC+1)	Ntolla 37'	Report	Ekitike 13'; Soler 78'; Bernat 90+1'	Stadium: Stade Gaston-Petit; Attendance: 14,000; Referee: Bastien Dechepy

23 January 2023 Round of 32	Pays de Cassel	0–7	Paris Saint-Germain	Lens
20:45 CET (UTC+1)	Bruneel (yellow card) 30'	Report	Mbappé 29', 34', 40', 56', 79'; Neymar (yellow card) 26', (goal) 33'; Soler 64'	Stadium: Stade Bollaert-Delelis; Attendance: 38,000; Referee: Willy Delajod

8 February 2023 Round of 16	Marseille	2–1	Paris Saint-Germain	Marseille
21:10 CET (UTC+1)	Sánchez 31' (pen.); Guendouzi (yellow card) 48'; Mbemba (yellow card) 49'; Malinovskyi 57'	Report	Ramos 45+2'; Mendes (yellow card) 64'	Stadium: Stade Vélodrome; Attendance: 65,329; Referee: François Letexier

=== Trophée des Champions ===
31 July 2022 Final	Paris Saint-Germain	4–0	Nantes	Tel Aviv
21:00 CEST (UTC+2)	Vitinha (yellow card) 16'; Messi 22'; Neymar 45+5', 82' (pen.); Ramos 57'	Report	Coco (yellow card) 38'; Moutoussamy (yellow card) 75'; Castelletto (red card) 81'	Stadium: Bloomfield Stadium; Attendance: 28,000; Referee: Orel Grinfeld (Israel)

=== UEFA Champions League ===
==== Group stage ====
The group stage draw was held on 25 August 2022.

Pos	Team	Pld	W	D	L	GF	GA	GD	Pts	Qualification	BEN	PAR	JUV	MHA
1	(Portugal) Benfica	6	4	2	0	16	7	+9	14 (Note: Tied on head-to-head results, overall goal difference and overall goals scored. Overall away goals scored: Benfica 9, Paris Saint-Germain 6.)	Advance to knockout phase	—	1–1	4–3	2–0
2	(France) Paris Saint-Germain	6	4	2	0	16	7	+9	14	Advance to knockout phase	1–1	—	2–1	7–2
3	(Italy) Juventus	6	1	0	5	9	13	−4	3 (Note: Tied on head-to-head results. Overall goal difference is used as the tiebreaker.)	Transfer to Europa League	1–2	1–2	—	3–1
4	(Israel) Maccabi Haifa	6	1	0	5	7	21	−14	3		1–6	1–3	2–0	—

Source: UEFA
Rules for classification: Group stage tiebreakers
Notes:

6 September 2022 1	Paris Saint-Germain (France)	2–1	(Italy) Juventus	Paris, France
21:00 CEST (UTC+1)	Mbappé 5', 22'; Ramos (yellow card) 25'; Verratti (yellow card) 65'	Report	Bremer (yellow card) 25'; Miretti (yellow card) 45+1'; McKennie 53'; Danilo (yellow card) 73'	Stadium: Parc des Princes; Attendance: 47,415; Referee: Anthony Taylor (England)

14 September 2022 2	Maccabi Haifa (Israel)	1–3	(France) Paris Saint-Germain	Haifa, Israel
22:00 IDT (UTC+3)	Chery 24'; Atzili (yellow card) 49'; Haziza (yellow card) 60'; Pierrot (yellow card) 77'	Report	Messi 37'; Mbappé 69'; Neymar 88', (yellow card) 89'	Stadium: Sammy Ofer Stadium; Attendance: 30,421; Referee: Daniel Siebert (Germany)

5 October 2022 3	Benfica (Portugal)	1–1	(France) Paris Saint-Germain	Lisbon, Portugal
20:00 WEST (UTC+1)	Pereira 41' (o.g.); Fernández (yellow card) 45'; Ramos (yellow card) 70'	Report	Messi 22'; Fabián (yellow card) 90+1'; Neymar (yellow card) 90+1'; Verratti (yellow card) 90+4'	Stadium: Estádio da Luz; Attendance: 62,295; Referee: Jesús Gil Manzano (Spain)

11 October 2022 4	Paris Saint-Germain (France)	1–1	(Portugal) Benfica	Paris, France
21:00 CEST (UTC+2)	Sarabia (yellow card) 29'; Mbappé 40' (pen.); Verratti (yellow card) 61'	Report	Otamendi (yellow card) 21'; João Mário (yellow card) 43', (goal) 62' (pen.); Florentino (yellow card) 45+3'; Fernández (yellow card) 69'; Gilberto (yellow card) 83'	Stadium: Parc des Princes; Attendance: 46,435; Referee: Michael Oliver (England)

25 October 2022 5	Paris Saint-Germain (France)	7–2	(Israel) Maccabi Haifa	Paris, France
21:00 CEST (UTC+2)	Messi 19', 44'; Neymar (yellow card) 27', (goal) 35'; Mbappé 32', 64'; Ramos (yellow card) 40'; Goldberg 67' (o.g.); Soler 84'	Report	Seck (yellow card) 26', (goal) 38', 50'; Chery (yellow card) 47'; Atzili (yellow card) 54'; Lavi (yellow card) 74'	Stadium: Parc des Princes; Attendance: 46,435; Referee: Felix Zwayer (Germany)

2 November 2022 6	Juventus (Italy)	1–2	(France) Paris Saint-Germain	Turin, Italy
21:00 CET (UTC+1)	Gatti (yellow card) 14'; Bonucci 39'; Milik (yellow card) 45+2'; Fagioli (yellow card) 76'	Report	Mbappé 13'; Mendes 69'; Verratti (yellow card) 85'	Stadium: Juventus Stadium; Attendance: 41,089; Referee: Carlos del Cerro Grande (Spain)

==== Knockout phase ====
===== Round of 16 =====
The draw for the round of 16 was held on 7 November 2022.

14 February 2023 First leg	Paris Saint-Germain (France)	0–1	(Germany) Bayern Munich	Paris, France
21:00 CET (UTC+1)	Kimpembe (yellow card) 70'; Neymar (yellow card) 87'	Report	Pavard (yellow card) 26' (yellow-red card) 90+2'; Coman 53'	Stadium: Parc des Princes; Attendance: 46,435; Referee: Michael Oliver (England)

8 March 2023 Second leg	Bayern Munich (Germany)	2–0 (3–0 agg.)	(France) Paris Saint-Germain	Munich, Germany
21:00 CET (UTC+1)	Choupo-Moting 61'; Gnabry 89'	Report	Hakimi (yellow card) 90+5'	Stadium: Allianz Arena; Attendance: 75,000; Referee: Daniele Orsato (Italy)

== Statistics ==
=== Appearances and goals ===
No.	Pos	Nat	Player	Total		Ligue 1		Coupe de France		Trophée des Champions		UEFA Champions League	
No.	Pos	Nat	Player	Apps	Goals	Apps	Goals	Apps	Goals	Apps	Goals	Apps	Goals
Goalkeepers
16	GK	(Spain) ESP	Sergio Rico	0	0	0	0	0	0	0	0	0	0
90	GK	(France) FRA	Alexandre Letellier	1	0	0+1	0	0	0	0	0	0	0
99	GK	(Italy) ITA	Gianluigi Donnarumma	48	0	38	0	1	0	1	0	8	0
Defenders
2	DF	(Morocco) MAR	Achraf Hakimi	39	5	23+5	5	1+1	0	1	0	7+1	0
3	DF	(France) FRA	Presnel Kimpembe	15	0	9+2	0	0	0	1	0	1+2	0
4	DF	(Spain) ESP	Sergio Ramos	45	4	31+2	2	2+1	1	1	1	8	0
5	DF	(Brazil) BRA	Marquinhos	44	2	30+3	2	2	0	1	0	8	0
14	DF	(Spain) ESP	Juan Bernat	36	2	18+10	1	1+1	1	0+1	0	3+2	0
25	DF	(Portugal) POR	Nuno Mendes	32	2	18+5	1	2	0	1	0	5+1	1
26	DF	(France) FRA	Nordi Mukiele	25	0	12+7	0	1	0	0+1	0	1+3	0
29	DF	(France) FRA	Timothée Pembélé	6	0	4+1	0	1	0	0	0	0	0
31	DF	(France) FRA	El Chadaille Bitshiabu	16	0	6+7	0	1+1	0	0	0	0+1	0
Midfielders
6	MF	(Italy) ITA	Marco Verratti	38	0	27+2	0	1	0	1	0	7	0
8	MF	(Spain) ESP	Fabián Ruiz	37	3	21+6	3	1+2	0	0	0	3+4	0
15	MF	(Portugal) POR	Danilo Pereira	44	2	27+6	2	2+1	0	0+1	0	5+2	0
17	MF	(Portugal) POR	Vitinha	48	2	29+7	2	3	0	1	0	7+1	0
18	MF	(Portugal) POR	Renato Sanches	27	2	6+17	2	1	0	0	0	1+2	0
28	MF	(Spain) ESP	Carlos Soler	35	6	14+12	3	2+1	2	0	0	2+4	1
33	MF	(France) FRA	Warren Zaïre-Emery	31	2	8+18	2	1+1	0	0	0	1+2	0
35	MF	(Spain) ESP	Ismaël Gharbi	8	0	0+6	0	1+1	0	0	0	0	0
Forwards
7	FW	(France) FRA	Kylian Mbappé	43	41	32+2	29	1	5	0	0	7+1	7
10	FW	(Brazil) BRA	Neymar	29	18	18+2	13	2	1	1	2	6	2
30	FW	(Argentina) ARG	Lionel Messi	41	21	32	16	1	0	1	1	7	4
37	FW	(France) FRA	Ilyes Housni	2	0	0+1	0	0+1	0	0	0	0	0
44	FW	(France) FRA	Hugo Ekitike	32	4	12+13	3	2+1	1	0	0	0+4	0
Players transferred out during the season
1	GK	(Costa Rica) CRC	Keylor Navas	2	0	0	0	2	0	0	0	0	0
8	MF	(Argentina) ARG	Leandro Paredes	4	0	0+3	0	0	0	0+1	0	0	0
19	MF	(Spain) ESP	Pablo Sarabia	19	0	3+11	0	1	0	1	0	1+2	0
29	FW	(France) FRA	Arnaud Kalimuendo	1	0	0	0	0	0	0+1	0	0	0

Source: Competitions

=== Goalscorers ===
Rank	No.	Pos.	Player	Ligue 1	Coupe de France	Trophée des Champions	Champions League	Total
1	7	FW	(France) Kylian Mbappé	29	5	0	7	41
2	30	FW	(Argentina) Lionel Messi	16	0	1	4	21
3	10	FW	(Brazil) Neymar	13	1	2	2	18
4	28	MF	(Spain) Carlos Soler	3	2	0	1	6
5	2	DF	(Morocco) Achraf Hakimi	5	0	0	0	5
6	4	DF	(Spain) Sergio Ramos	2	1	1	0	4
6	44	FW	(France) Hugo Ekitike	3	1	0	0	4
8	8	MF	(Spain) Fabián Ruiz	3	0	0	0	3
9	5	DF	(Brazil) Marquinhos	2	0	0	0	2
9	14	DF	(Spain) Juan Bernat	1	1	0	0	2
9	15	MF	(Portugal) Danilo Pereira	2	0	0	0	2
9	17	MF	(Portugal) Vitinha	2	0	0	0	2
9	18	MF	(Portugal) Renato Sanches	2	0	0	0	2
9	25	DF	(Portugal) Nuno Mendes	1	0	0	1	2
9	33	MF	(France) Warren Zaïre-Emery	2	0	0	0	2
Own goals				3	0	0	1	4
Totals				89	11	4	16	120
