= 1985–86 French Division 2 =

47th season of the second-tier football league in France

Division 2
- Season: 1985–86

Statistics of Division 2 in the 1985–86 season.

== Overview ==
It was contested by 36 teams, and Saint-Étienne and Paris won the championship.

== League tables ==
=== Group A ===
Pos	Team	Pld	W	D	L	GF	GA	GD	Pts	Promotion or relegation
1	Saint-Étienne	34	18	10	6	50	29	+21	46	Promoted
2	Olympique Alès	34	16	9	9	33	22	+11	41	
3	Olympique Lyonnais	34	14	12	8	47	31	+16	40	
4	Sète	34	15	10	9	33	28	+5	40	
5	Montpellier	34	15	9	10	61	49	+12	39	
6	Nîmes Olympique	34	14	10	10	61	35	+26	38	
7	Le Puy	34	14	7	13	52	41	+11	35	
8	Béziers	34	13	9	12	43	38	+5	35	
9	Tours	33	11	12	10	39	37	+2	34	
10	Gueugnon	34	12	9	13	32	39	−7	33	
11	Martigues	34	11	10	13	35	45	−10	32	
12	Cannes	34	8	15	11	35	41	−6	31	
13	Thonon	34	9	13	12	26	35	−9	31	
14	Montceau	34	13	4	17	39	44	−5	30	
15	Istres	34	8	14	12	39	47	−8	30	
16	Red Star Paris	34	8	14	12	30	42	−12	30	
17	Chaumont	34	9	8	17	35	58	−23	26	Relegated
18	Grenoble	33	5	9	19	31	62	−31	19	Relegated

Source: rsssf.com

=== Group B ===
Pos	Team	Pld	W	D	L	GF	GA	GD	Pts	Promotion or relegation
1	RC Paris	34	24	8	2	78	24	+54	56	Promoted
2	Mulhouse	34	20	10	4	64	32	+32	50	
3	En Avant Guingamp	34	17	13	4	68	35	+33	47	
4	Stade Reims	34	17	9	8	49	37	+12	43	
5	Chamois Niort	34	14	9	11	40	36	+4	37	
6	Caen	34	14	9	11	33	31	+2	37	
7	Orléans	34	12	9	13	39	42	−3	33	
8	Stade Quimpérois	34	11	10	13	38	43	−5	32	
9	Abbeville	34	12	6	16	41	60	−19	30	
10	Limoges	34	11	7	16	40	43	−3	29	
11	Beauvais	34	11	7	16	35	52	−17	29	
12	Valenciennes	34	9	10	15	45	50	−5	28	
13	Dunkerque	34	9	10	15	31	37	−6	28	
14	Besançon	34	10	8	16	39	46	−7	28	
15	Angers	34	11	6	17	32	47	−15	28	
16	Lorient	34	11	6	17	28	53	−25	28	Relegated
17	Rouen	34	11	5	18	32	43	−11	27	Relegated
18	CS Sedan Ardennes	34	7	8	19	26	47	−21	22	Relegated

Source: rsssf.com

== Championship play-offs ==
Team 1	Agg.	Team 2	1st leg	2nd leg
Racing Paris	4–3	Saint-Étienne	3–2	1–1 (a.e.t.)

== Promotion play-offs ==
Quarter-final
2B	Mulhouse	2
3A	Lyon	1
2A	Alès	3
3B	Guingamp	0

Semi-final
2B	Mulhouse	2	1	3
2A	Alès	0	1	1

Final
18	Nancy	3	0	3
2B	Mulhouse	0	2	2

== Top goalscorers ==
Rank	Player	Club (Grp)	Goals
1	(Zaire) Eugène Kabongo	Racing Paris (B)	30
2	(Poland) Andrzej Szarmach	Guingamp (B)	26
3	(France) Jean-Marc Valadier	Montpellier (A)	22
3	(France) Marco Morgante	Mulhouse (B)	22
5	(Socialist Federal Republic of Yugoslavia) Milan Ćalasan	Orléans (B)	17
5	(Socialist Federal Republic of Yugoslavia) Simo Nikolić	Béziers (A)	17
7	(Uruguay) Juan Carlos Acosta	Le Puy (A)	16
8	(France) Hervé Guégan	Guingamp (B)	15
8	(Socialist Federal Republic of Yugoslavia) Dušan Savić	Cannes (A)	15
10	(Cameroon) Philippe N'Dioro	Limoges (B)	14
10	(France) Franck Priou	Istres (A)	14
10	(France) Christian Perez	Nîmes (A)	14
10	(France) Jean-Pierre Orts	Nîmes (A)	14
