= Guégan =

Guégan is a Breton surname. Notable people with the surname include:

- Élodie Guégan (born 1985), French middle-distance runner
- Hervé Guégan (born 1963), French footballer
- Jean-Baptiste Guégan (born 1983), French singer
- Marc-Adolphe Guégan (1891–1959), French journalist and poet
- Olivier Guégan (born 1972), French footballer
- Raymond Guégan (1921–2007), French cyclist
