= Ismaël Gharbi =

Footballer (born 2004)

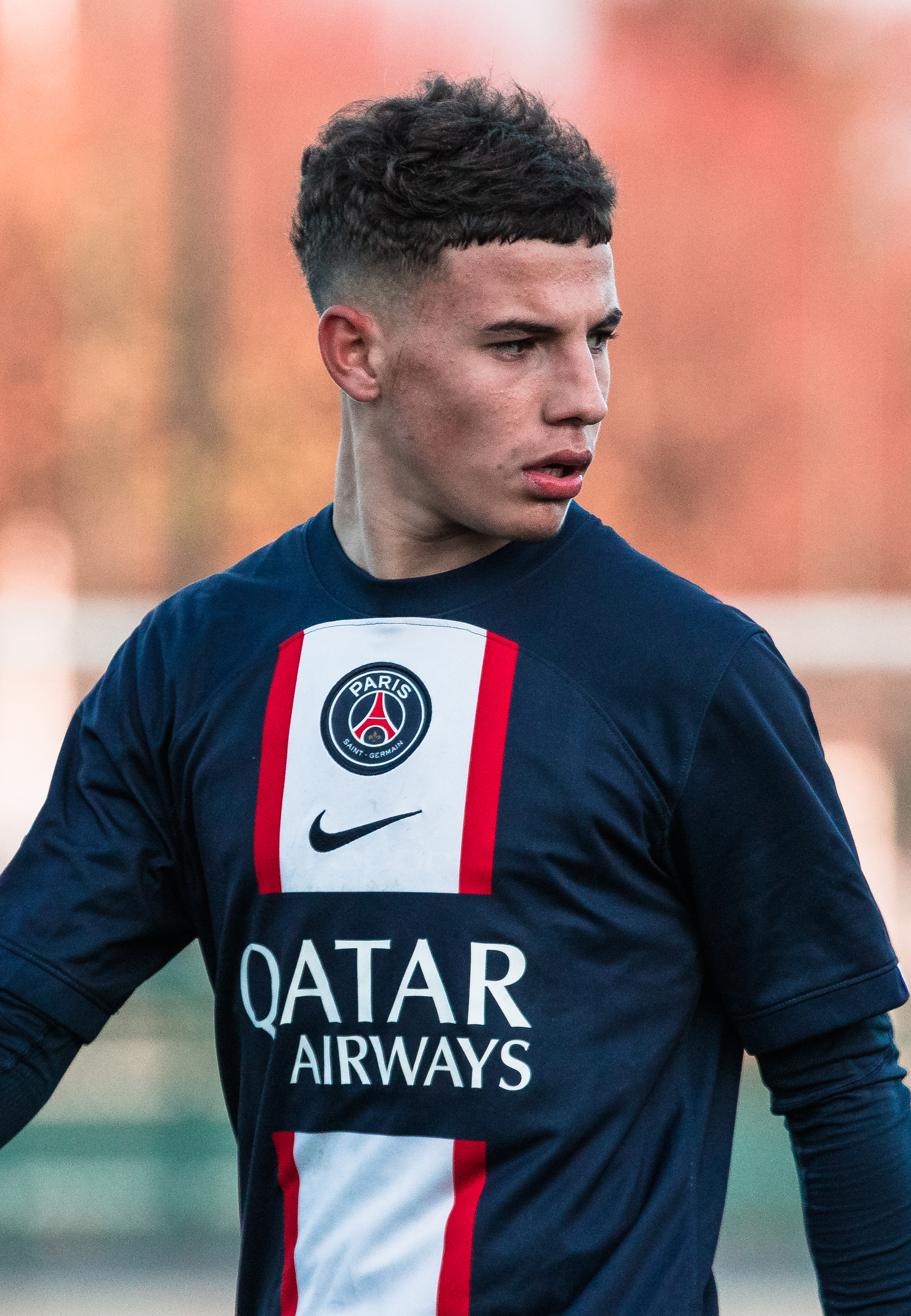
- Gharbi with Paris Saint-Germain in 2022

Personal information
- Full name: Ismaël Seifallah Gharbi
- Date of birth: 10 April 2004 (age 22)
- Place of birth: Paris, France
- Height: 1.73 m (5 ft 8 in)
- Position: Midfielder

Team information
- Current team: Leganés (on loan from Braga)
- Number: 17

Youth career
- 2010–2016: Paris FC
- 2016–2023: Paris Saint-Germain

Senior career*
Years	Team	Apps	(Gls)
2021–2024	Paris Saint-Germain	7	(0)
2023–2024	→ Stade Lausanne Ouchy (loan)	29	(6)
2024–	Braga	24	(4)
2025–2026	→ FC Augsburg (loan)	6	(0)
2026–	→ Leganés (loan)	8	(2)

International career^{‡}
2021	France U18	4	(3)
2022	Spain U18	3	(0)
2022–2023	Spain U19	6	(1)
2025–	Tunisia	20	(2)
- * Club domestic league appearances and goals as of 23:36, 11 October 2026 (UTC) ‡ National team caps and goals as of 26 June 2026

Ismaël Seifallah Gharbi (Tunisian Arabic: إسماعيل سيفالله غربي; born 10 April 2004) is a professional footballer who plays as a midfielder for Segunda División club Leganés on loan from Primeira Liga club Braga. Born in France and a former youth international for France and Spain, he plays for the Tunisia national team.

== Club career ==
Gharbi began his career at Paris FC in 2010, and joined the Paris Saint-Germain Academy in 2016. In 2020, he was part of the PSG team that participated at the Alkass International Cup in Qatar, finishing in third place. He scored 5 goals across the tournament; a brace against Kashiwa Reysol in the group stage, a goal against Zenit Saint Petersburg in the quarter-finals, one against Inter Milan in the semi-finals, and another against the Mohammed VI Academy in the third place match.

In April 2021, Gharbi was included in the Paris Saint-Germain (PSG) squad for the UEFA Champions League quarter-final first leg against Bayern Munich, an eventual 3–2 victory for Les Parisiens at the Allianz Arena. On 14 July 2021, he scored a goal in his first appearance for PSG's senior team, a 4–0 friendly victory over Le Mans at the Camp des Loges. On 1 August 2021, Gharbi made his professional debut, coming on as a substitute in a 1–0 Trophée des Champions loss to Lille. His Coupe de France debut came on 19 December in a 3–0 win over Feignies Aulnoye. On 8 May 2022, Gharbi made his first-ever Ligue 1 appearance, coming on as a substitute in a 2–2 draw with Troyes at the Parc des Princes. He signed his first professional contract with Paris Saint-Germain on 17 June, a three-year deal until 30 June 2025. In the 2022–23 season, he made six league appearances and won his second league title.

On 1 September 2023, Gharbi was loaned out to Swiss Super League club Stade Lausanne Ouchy until the end of the season. On 31 August 2024, Gharbi signed for Primeira Liga club Braga on a five-year contract. Braga paid no transfer fee, but PSG retained 50% of the player's economic rights. A €35 million release clause was included in Gharbi's contract. On 1 September 2025, Gharbi joined Bundesliga club FC Augsburg on a season-long loan with an option to buy.

On 23 July 2026, Gharbi moved to Spain on a one-year loan to Leganés.

== International career ==
Gharbi was born in France to a Tunisian father and Spanish mother, and was therefore eligible to represent France, Spain, and Tunisia. In 2021, he was called up to play for the France under-18s for the Tournoi International de Limoges. In February 2022, Gharbi was called up to the Spain under-18s. In June, he represented Spain at the 2022 Mediterranean Games in Oran, Algeria.

On 19 August 2025, Gharbi's request to switch international allegiance to Tunisia was approved by FIFA. He earned his first cap on 4 September during a 2026 FIFA World Cup qualification game coming on as a second-half substitute against Liberia at the Hammadi Agrebi Stadium in Tunis, replacing Amor Layouni in the 53rd minute; the match ended in a 3–0 victory. On 10 October, he scored his first goal in his third appearance in a 6–0 win over São Tomé and Príncipe on Day 9 of the 2026 World Cup qualification.

== Style of play ==
Gharbi is a versatile player; although primarily an attacking midfielder, he can also play as a wide and central midfielder. Hervé Guégan, who coached Gharbi at the Alkass International Cup in 2020, has stated that he is a player "technically at ease" and that he "always makes passes with good timing". Gharbi is good at free kicks and possesses good ball control. While being able to score himself, he has an ability to make others score. In February 2022, former PSG player Mathieu Bodmer commented that "in the penalty area, time stops for [Gharbi]" and that he has "cold blood", being able to complete movements at the right moments.

== Career statistics ==
=== Club ===
As of match played 11 October 2026

Appearances and goals by club, season and competition
Club	Season	League			National cup (Note: Includes Coupe de France, Swiss Cup, Taça de Portugal, DFB-Pokal)		Continental		Other		Total	
Club	Season	Division	Apps	Goals	Apps	Goals	Apps	Goals	Apps	Goals	Apps	Goals
Paris Saint-Germain	2021–22	Ligue 1	1	0	2	0	0	0	1 (Note: Appearance in Trophée des Champions)	0	4	0
Paris Saint-Germain	2022–23	Ligue 1	6	0	2	0	0	0	0	0	8	0
Paris Saint-Germain	Total		7	0	4	0	0	0	1	0	12	0
Stade Lausanne Ouchy (loan)	2023–24	Swiss Super League	29	6	2	1	—		—		31	7
Braga	2024–25	Primeira Liga	23	4	4	0	7 (Note: Appearances in UEFA Europa League)	0	1 (Note: Appearances in Taça da Liga)	0	35	4
Braga	2025–26	Primeira Liga	1	0	—		2	0	—		3	0
Braga	Total		24	4	4	0	9	0	1	0	38	4
FC Augsburg (loan)	2025–26	Bundesliga	6	0	1	0	—		—		7	0
Leganés (loan)	2026–27	Segunda División	8	2	0	0	—		—		8	2
Career total			74	13	11	1	9	0	2	0	96	14

=== International ===
As of match played 25 June 2026

Appearances and goals by national team, and year
National team	Year	Apps	Goals
Tunisia	2025	11	2
Tunisia	2026	9	0
Total		20	2

Scores and results list Tunisia's goal tally first.

List of international goals scored by Ismaël Gharbi
No.	Date	Venue	Opponent	Score	Result	Competition
1	10 October 2025	Hammadi Agrebi Stadium, Tunis, Tunisia	São Tomé and Príncipe	4–0	6–0	2026 FIFA World Cup qualification
2	30 December 2025	Rabat Olympic Stadium, Rabat, Morocco	Tanzania	1–0	1–1	2025 Africa Cup of Nations

== Honours ==
Paris Saint-Germain

- Ligue 1: 2021–22, 2022–23
