= Ahamada =

Ahamada is a Comorian surname. Notable people with the surname include:

- Ali Ahamada (born 1991), Comorian footballer
- Anfane Ahamada (born 2002), Comorian footballer
- Feta Ahamada (born 1987), Comorian sprinter
- Hassan Ahamada (born 1981), French footballer
- Naouirou Ahamada (born 2002), French footballer
- Saïd Ahamada (born 1972), French politician
