= Juan Bernat =

Spanish footballer (born 1993)

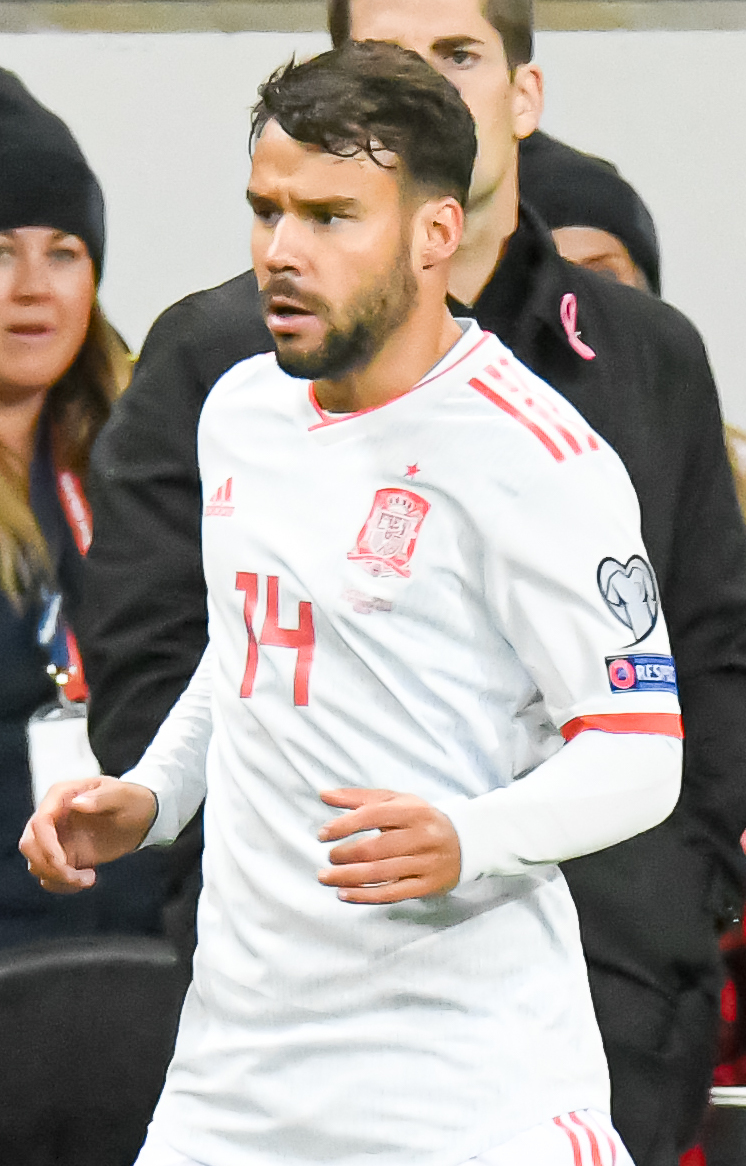
- Bernat with Spain in 2019

Personal information
- Full name: Juan Bernat Velasco
- Date of birth: 1 March 1993 (age 33)
- Place of birth: Cullera, Spain
- Height: 1.77 m (5 ft 10 in)
- Position: Left-back

Team information
- Current team: Eibar
- Number: 24

Youth career
- 2000–2011: Valencia

Senior career*
Years	Team	Apps	(Gls)
2011–2012	Valencia B	24	(7)
2011–2014	Valencia	51	(1)
2014–2018	Bayern Munich	76	(3)
2018–2025	Paris Saint-Germain	89	(2)
2023–2024	→ Benfica (loan)	3	(0)
2024–2025	→ Villarreal (loan)	10	(0)
2025	Villarreal	0	(0)
2025	Getafe	14	(0)
2026–	Eibar	20	(0)

International career
2009	Spain U16	3	(0)
2009–2010	Spain U17	11	(4)
2012	Spain U19	6	(0)
2013	Spain U20	7	(1)
2013–2014	Spain U21	7	(0)
2014–2019	Spain	11	(1)
Medal record
Men's football
Representing Spain
UEFA European Under-19 Championship
Winner	2012 Estonia
UEFA European Under-17 Championship
Runner-up	2010 Liechtenstein
- * Club domestic league appearances and goals as of 18:30, 31 October 2026 (UTC)

Juan Bernat Velasco (Spanish pronunciation: [ˈxwam beɾˈnat]; (Note: In isolation, Juan is pronounced [xwan].) born 1 March 1993) is a Spanish professional footballer who plays as a left-back for Segunda División club Eibar.

He began his career at Valencia, featuring in three La Liga campaigns for the club. He moved to Bayern Munich in 2014, winning the Bundesliga every season during his four-year spell while appearing in 115 competitive matches. In August 2018, he signed with Paris Saint-Germain, playing in the 2020 UEFA Champions League final and losing to his former side Bayern Munich. He suffered an anterior cruciate ligament injury in September 2020 that would keep him out for over a year. After returning to play in 2021, he spent time on loan at Benfica and Villarreal before joining Getafe in 2025.

A European champion with the under-19 team in 2012, Bernat made his senior debut for Spain in 2014.

== Club career ==
=== Valencia ===
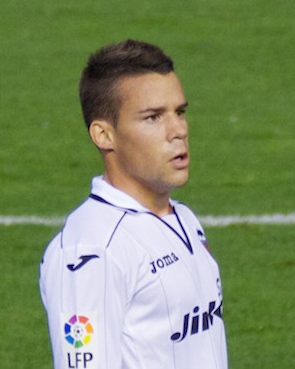
Bernat with Valencia in 2012

Born in Cullera, Valencian Community, Bernat was a product of Valencia's youth system. He made his senior debut at only 17, appearing with the reserves in the Tercera División and helping them to return to Segunda División B. He was brought to the main squad for the 2011 pre-season, scoring in a 3–0 away win against Sporting CP, and earned a professional contract until 2015 shortly after.

Bernat made his debut with the Che's first team in a 4–3 La Liga home victory over Racing de Santander on 27 August 2011; he started the game and was replaced at half-time, with the score at 2–1 for the visitors. His second league appearance occurred on 22 January 2012 in a 1–1 draw at Osasuna, substituting Jonas in the 57th minute. He continued featuring regularly for the B's in the third tier.

Bernat scored his first official goal for Valencia on 28 November 2012, netting his team's last in a 3–1 home defeat of Llagostera for that season's Copa del Rey (5–1 on aggregate). He scored his first in the league roughly one year later, coming from the bench for the 1–1 equaliser at Elche (eventual 2–1 loss).

From 2013 onwards, Bernat started being utilised as a left-back.

=== Bayern Munich ===
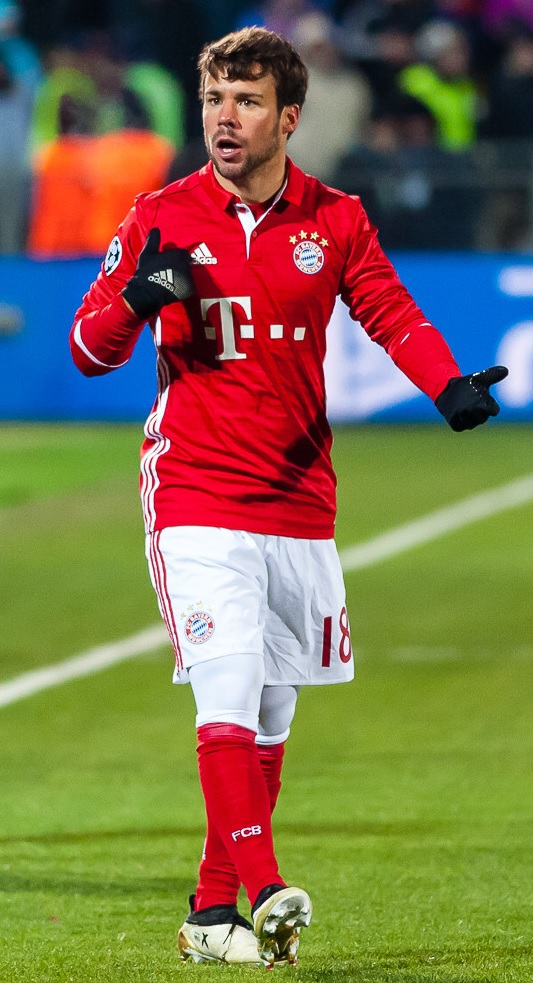
Bernat with Bayern Munich in 2016

On 7 July 2014, Bernat signed for Bayern Munich on a five-year contract. He made his debut on 13 August, playing the entirety of the 2–0 defeat to Borussia Dortmund in the DFL-Supercup, and played his first Bundesliga match nine days later, a 2–1 home win against VfL Wolfsburg.

Shortly after being placed first in Outside of the Boot's Talent Radar Top 20 Young Players of 2014, Bernat scored his first competitive goal for the Bavarians, but in a 4–1 loss at Wolfsburg on 30 January 2015.

=== Paris Saint-Germain ===
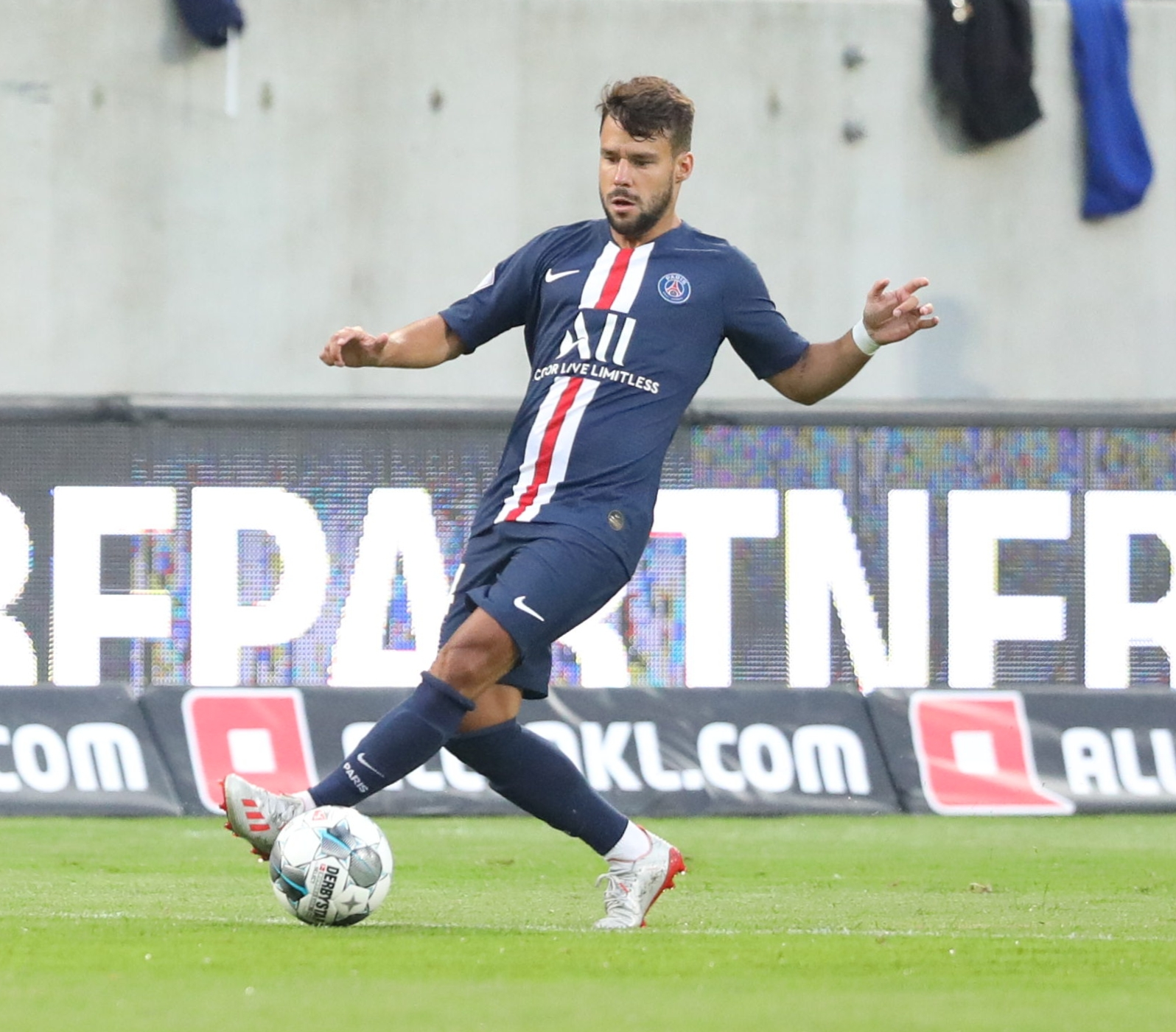
Bernat with Paris Saint-Germain in 2019

On 31 August 2018, Bernat joined Paris Saint-Germain on a three-year deal, replacing Yuri Berchiche who had left for Athletic Bilbao. His Ligue 1 debut occurred on 14 September in a home fixture against Saint-Étienne, and played the full 90 minutes in the 4–0 win. He scored his first competitive goal for the team on 6 November, in a 1–1 away draw with Napoli in the group stage of the UEFA Champions League; in the following Champions League seasons, he would also score against Liverpool, Manchester United, Borussia Dortmund and RB Leipzig.

On 16 September 2020, Bernat suffered an anterior cruciate ligament injury in a match against Metz; it was reported he would miss six months of action. On 16 March 2021, he signed an extension to keep him at the club until 2025. His return to play would come later than initially planned, on 15 October in a 2–1 league victory over Angers at the Parc des Princes.

On 1 September 2023, Bernat joined Benfica on a season-long loan. He made his debut on 3 October, starting in a 1–0 defeat at Inter Milan in the Champions League group stage. His maiden Primeira Liga appearance took place four days later, when he came off the bench for David Jurásek in the 77th minute of a 1–0 away win over Estoril; he totalled only seven appearances during his spell, being often injured.

=== Villarreal ===
Bernat was loaned to Villarreal in the Spanish top division on 30 August 2024. On 22 January 2025, his transfer was made permanent after PSG terminated his contract.

On 3 February 2025, Bernat was released.

=== Later career ===
Shortly after leaving Villarreal, Bernat signed for Getafe on a deal until the end of the season. On 12 February 2026, the free agent joined Segunda División club Eibar.

== International career ==
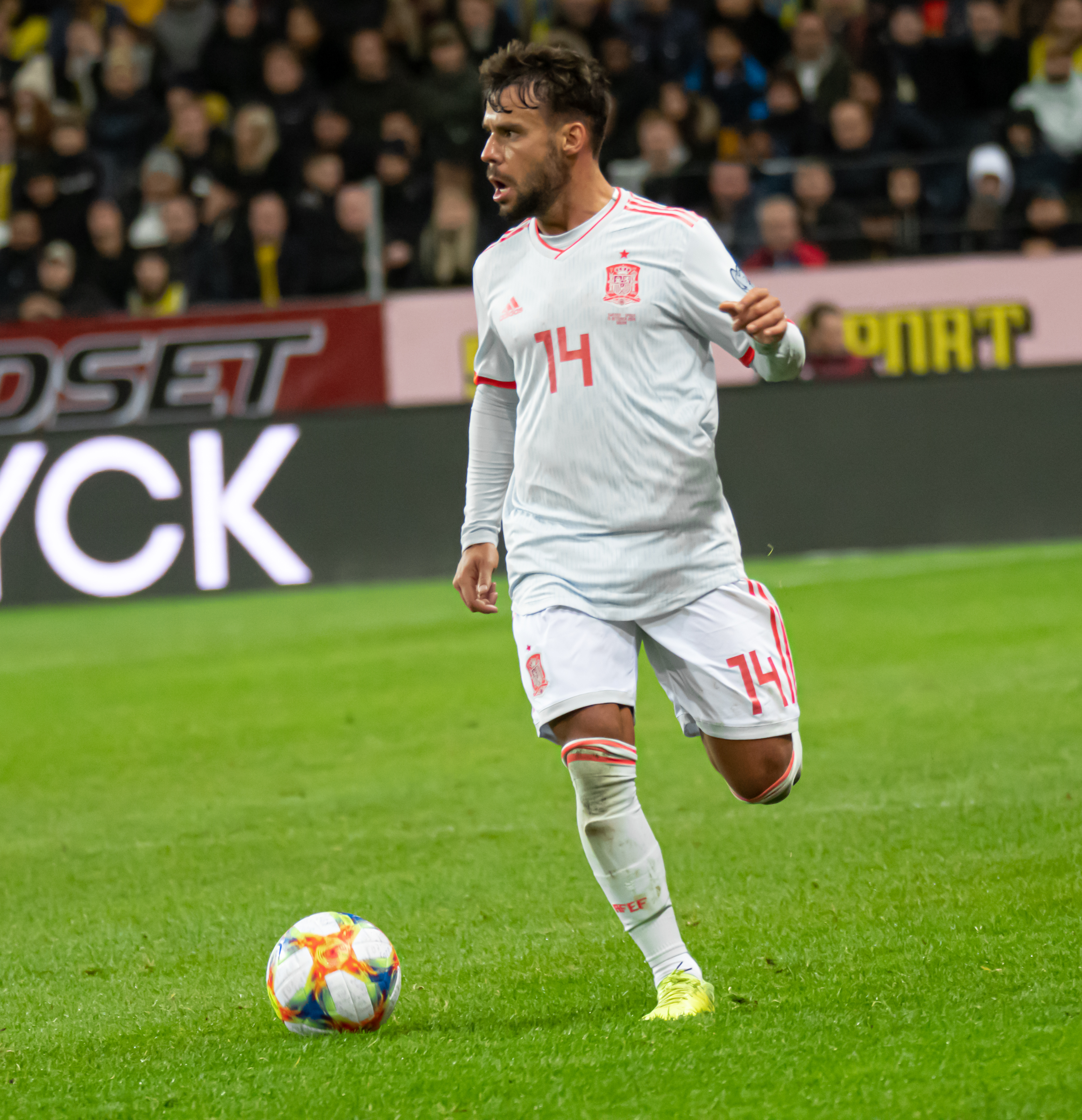
Bernat in action for Spain in 2019

Bernat moved through the Spanish international youth setup, representing all sides between the under-16s and the under-21s. He made his debut with the former in 2009, and with the under-17 side he reached the final at the 2010 UEFA European Championship, playing alongside Valencia teammate Paco Alcácer.

In 2012, Bernat was part of the squad that won the Under-19 Championship in Estonia. On 3 October 2014, he was called up by full side manager Vicente del Bosque for UEFA Euro 2016 qualifying matches against Slovakia and Luxembourg: he made his debut on the 12th against the latter, replacing Andrés Iniesta for the final 20 minutes and scoring the last goal of a 4–0 win.

== Career statistics ==
=== Club ===
As of match played 31 October 2026

Appearances and goals by club, season and competition
Club	Season	League			National cup (Note: Includes Copa del Rey, DFB-Pokal, Coupe de France, Taça de Portugal)		League cup (Note: Includes Coupe de la Ligue, Taça da Liga)		Continental		Other		Total	
Club	Season	Division	Apps	Goals	Apps	Goals	Apps	Goals	Apps	Goals	Apps	Goals	Apps	Goals
Valencia B	2011–12	Segunda División B	24	7	0	0	—		0	0	—		24	7
Valencia	2011–12	La Liga	7	0	1	0	—		2 (Note: Appearances in UEFA Europa League)	0	—		10	0
Valencia	2012–13	La Liga	12	0	3	1	—		0	0	—		15	1
Valencia	2013–14	La Liga	32	1	4	0	—		13	1	—		49	2
Valencia	Total		51	1	8	1	—		15	1	—		74	3
Bayern Munich	2014–15	Bundesliga	31	1	5	0	—		12 (Note: Appearances in UEFA Champions League)	0	1 (Note: Appearance in DFL-Supercup)	0	49	1
Bayern Munich	2015–16	Bundesliga	16	0	3	0	—		8	0	0	0	27	0
Bayern Munich	2016–17	Bundesliga	18	2	3	0	—		4	2	0	0	25	4
Bayern Munich	2017–18	Bundesliga	11	0	0	0	—		1	0	0	0	12	0
Bayern Munich	Total		76	3	11	0	—		25	2	1	0	113	5
Paris Saint-Germain	2018–19	Ligue 1	25	1	6	0	2	0	8	3	0	0	41	4
Paris Saint-Germain	2019–20	Ligue 1	18	0	2	0	1	0	10	2	1 (Note: Appearance in Trophée des Champions)	0	32	2
Paris Saint-Germain	2020–21	Ligue 1	3	0	0	0	—		0	0	0	0	3	0
Paris Saint-Germain	2021–22	Ligue 1	15	0	1	0	—		0	0	0	0	16	0
Paris Saint-Germain	2022–23	Ligue 1	28	1	2	1	—		5	0	1	0	36	2
Paris Saint-Germain	Total		89	2	11	1	3	0	23	5	2	0	128	8
Benfica (loan)	2023–24	Primeira Liga	3	0	1	0	1	0	2	0	0	0	7	0
Villarreal (loan)	2024–25	La Liga	10	0	2	0	—		—		—		12	0
Getafe	2024–25	La Liga	14	0	1	0	—		—		—		15	0
Eibar	2025–26	Segunda División	10	0	0	0	—		—		—		10	0
Eibar	2026–27	Segunda División	10	0	0	0	—		—		—		10	0
Eibar	Total		20	0	0	0	—		—		—		20	0
Career total			286	13	34	2	4	0	65	8	3	0	393	23

=== International ===
Appearances and goals by national team and year
National team	Year	Apps	Goals
Spain	2014	2	1
Spain	2015	5	0
Spain	2019	4	0
Total		11	1

Spain score listed first, score column indicates score after each Bernat goal.

List of international goals scored by Juan Bernat
No.	Date	Venue	Opponent	Score	Result	Competition
1	12 October 2014	Josy Barthel, Luxembourg City, Luxembourg	Luxembourg	4–0	4–0	UEFA Euro 2016 qualifying

== Honours ==
Bayern Munich

- Bundesliga: 2014–15, 2015–16, 2016–17, 2017–18
- DFB-Pokal: 2015–16
- DFL-Supercup: 2016, 2018

Paris Saint-Germain

- Ligue 1: 2018–19, 2019–20, 2021–22, 2022–23
- Coupe de France: 2019–20; runner-up: 2018–19
- Coupe de la Ligue: 2019–20
- Trophée des Champions: 2019, 2022
- UEFA Champions League runner-up: 2019–20

Spain U17

- UEFA European Under-17 Championship runner-up: 2010

Spain U19

- UEFA European Under-19 Championship: 2012
