= Nordi Mukiele =

French footballer (born 1997)

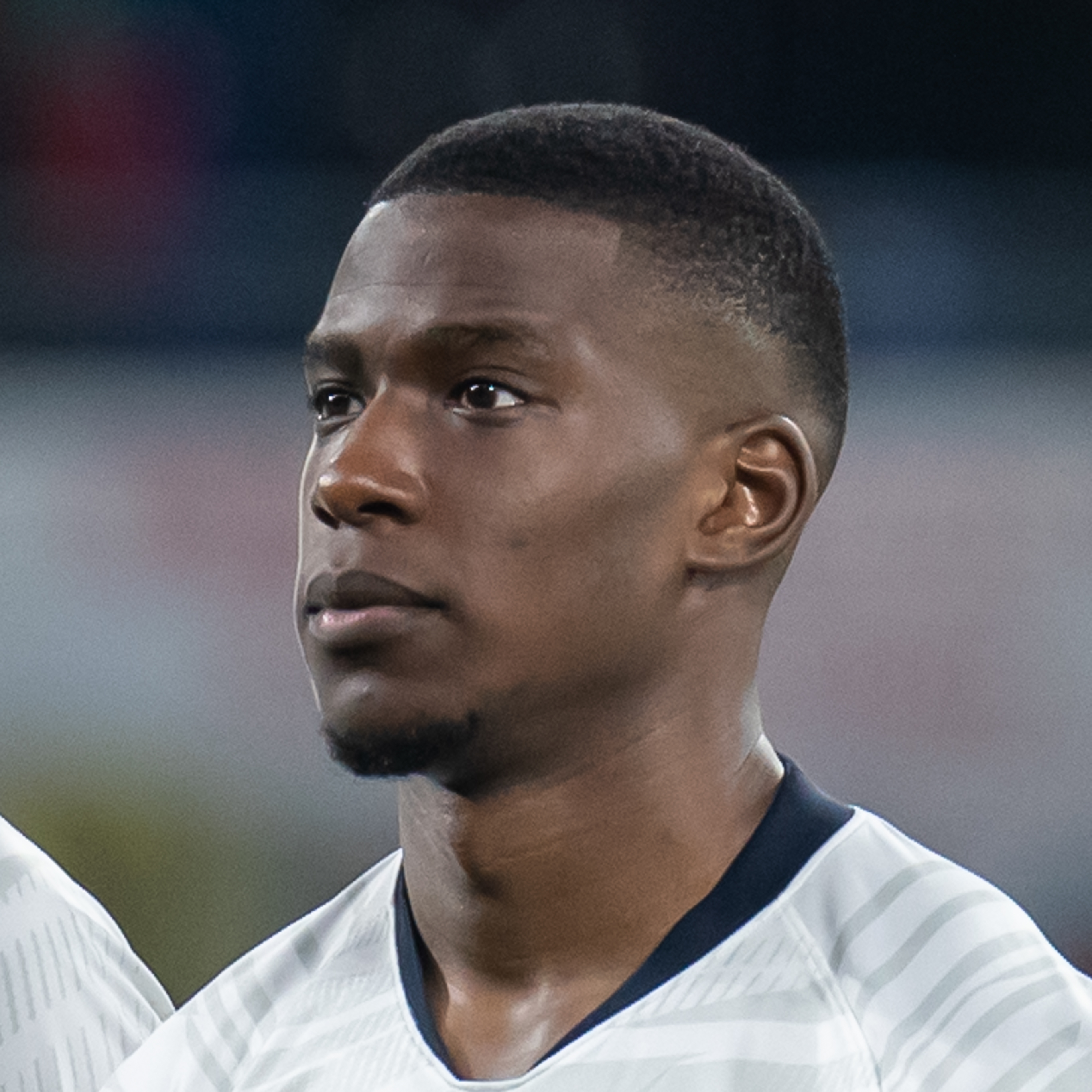
- Mukiele with RB Leipzig in 2020

Personal information
- Full name: Nordi Mukiele Mulere
- Date of birth: 1 November 1997 (age 29)
- Place of birth: Montreuil, France
- Height: 1.87 m (6 ft 2 in)
- Positions: Right-back; centre-back

Team information
- Current team: Sunderland
- Number: 20

Youth career
- 2004–2013: Paris FC
- 2013–2014: Laval

Senior career*
Years	Team	Apps	(Gls)
2014–2016	Laval B	24	(1)
2014–2017	Laval	34	(2)
2017–2018	Montpellier	50	(0)
2018–2022	RB Leipzig	100	(8)
2022–2025	Paris Saint-Germain	35	(0)
2024–2025	→ Bayer Leverkusen (loan)	15	(1)
2025–	Sunderland	39	(3)

International career
2015	France U18	2	(0)
2016	France U19	1	(0)
2016–2017	France U20	6	(0)
2017–2019	France U21	6	(0)
2021	France	1	(0)
- * Club domestic league appearances and goals as of 25 October 2026

Nordi Mukiele Mulere (born 1 November 1997) is a French professional footballer who plays as a right-back or centre-back for Premier League club Sunderland.

== Early life ==
Mukiele was born in Montreuil, France on 1 November 1997. He is of Congolese descent.

== Club career ==
=== Laval ===
Mukiele began his professional career at Laval, where he broke into the first team aged 17. He made his debut on 28 November 2014, in a 1–1 Ligue 2 draw against Auxerre.

=== Montpellier ===
Mukiele's time at Laval saw him scouted by Ligue 1 side Montpellier, who signed him for a fee of €1.35 million in January 2017. He made his debut for the club on 21 January 2017 in a 2–0 league loss against Metz.

=== RB Leipzig ===
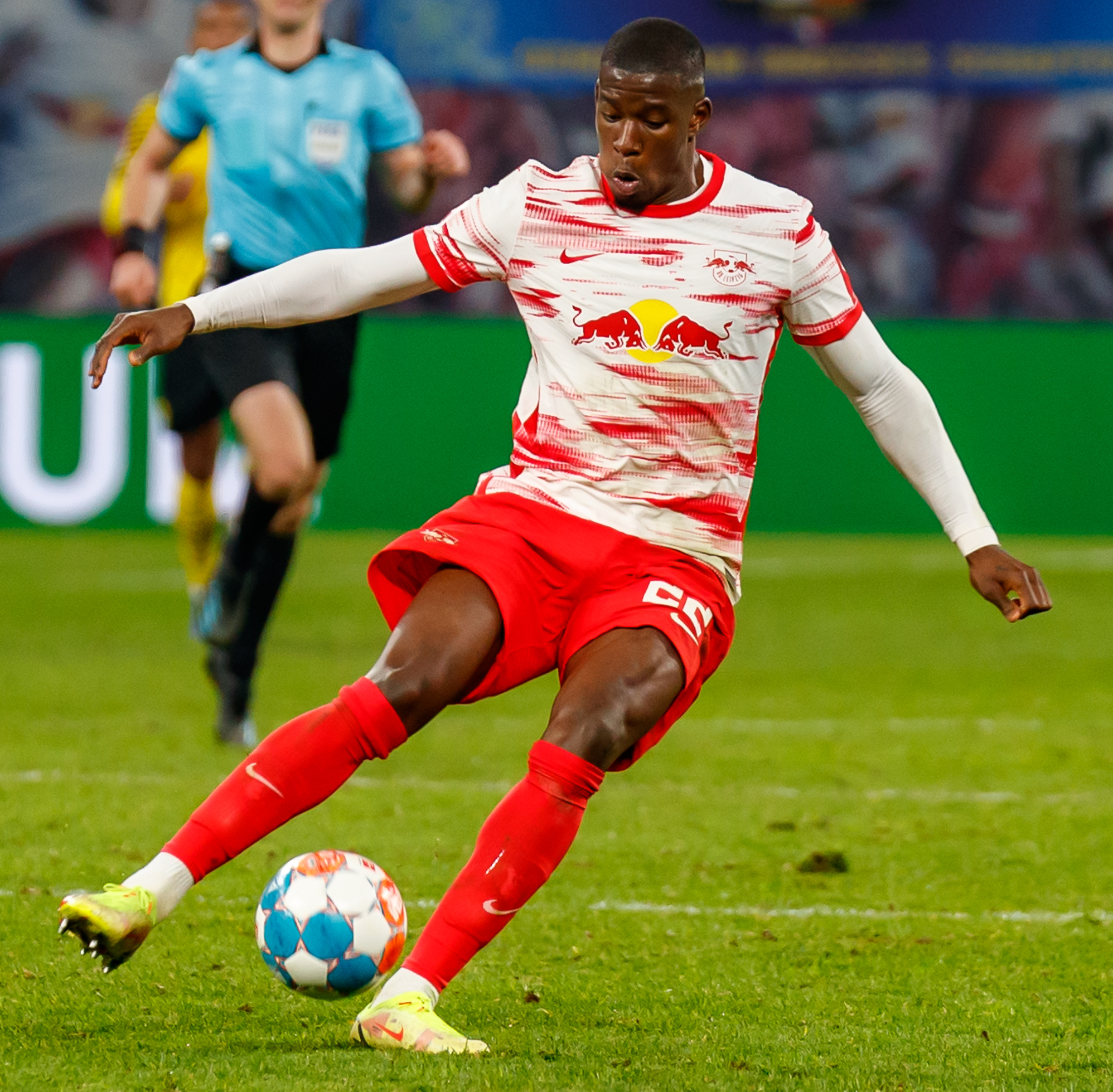
Mukiele playing for RB Leipzig in 2021

In 2018, Mukiele signed for Bundesliga club RB Leipzig on a five-year contract. The transfer cost Leipzig a €16 million transfer fee. He made his debut on 26 July 2018 in a UEFA Europa League qualifier against Häcken, winning 4–0. Mukiele's first league appearance came in a 1–1 draw with Fortuna Düsseldorf on 2 September 2018. On 18 May 2019, he scored his first goal for Leipzig in a 2–1 league defeat away to Werder Bremen.

On 2 December 2020, Mukiele scored his first UEFA Champions League goal in a 4–3 away win over İstanbul Başakşehir. He came off the bench in Leipzig's victory over SC Freiburg in the 2022 DFB-Pokal final, winning the first trophy of his career following a penalty shootout.

=== Paris Saint-Germain ===
On 26 July 2022, Mukiele signed for Ligue 1 club Paris Saint-Germain (PSG) on a five-year contract until 30 June 2027. Leipzig received a transfer fee of €10 million as part of the deal, with a potential €6 million in bonuses. On 31 July, he made his debut for PSG in a 4–0 win over Nantes in the Trophée des Champions.

==== Loan to Bayer Leverkusen ====
On 28 August 2024, Mukiele was loaned to Bayer Leverkusen for the season.

=== Sunderland ===
On 17 August 2025, Mukiele moved to the Premier League, signing a four-year contract with recently-promoted Sunderland for a £9.5 million fee, plus £2.5 million in add-ons. On 18 October 2025, he scored his first goal for Sunderland in a 2–0 win over Wolverhampton Wanderers.

== International career ==
Mukiele received his first call up to the senior France squad for FIFA World Cup qualification in September 2021. He made his debut on 7 September 2021 in a 2–0 home victory against Finland, coming on for Léo Dubois in the 67th minute.

== Personal life ==
His younger brother Nordan Mukiele plays professional football as a forward.

== Career statistics ==
=== Club ===
As of match played 25 October 2026

Appearances and goals by club, season and competition
Club	Season	League			National cup (Note: Includes Coupe de France, DFB-Pokal, FA Cup)		League cup (Note: Includes Coupe de la Ligue, EFL Cup)		Europe		Other		Total	
Club	Season	Division	Apps	Goals	Apps	Goals	Apps	Goals	Apps	Goals	Apps	Goals	Apps	Goals
Laval B	2014–15	CFA 2	14	1	—		—		—		—		14	1
Laval B	2015–16	CFA 2	9	0	—		—		—		—		9	0
Laval B	2016–17	CFA 2	1	0	—		—		—		—		1	0
Laval B	Total		24	1	—		—		—		—		24	1
Laval	2014–15	Ligue 2	2	0	0	0	0	0	—		—		2	0
Laval	2015–16	Ligue 2	15	2	1	0	2	0	—		—		18	2
Laval	2016–17	Ligue 2	17	0	1	0	3	0	—		—		21	0
Laval	Total		34	2	2	0	5	0	—		—		41	2
Montpellier	2016–17	Ligue 1	17	0	0	0	0	0	—		—		17	0
Montpellier	2017–18	Ligue 1	33	0	2	0	4	0	—		—		39	0
Montpellier	Total		50	0	2	0	4	0	—		—		56	0
RB Leipzig	2018–19	Bundesliga	19	1	4	0	—		8 (Note: Appearances in UEFA Europa League)	0	—		31	1
RB Leipzig	2019–20	Bundesliga	25	3	2	0	—		10 (Note: Appearances in UEFA Champions League)	0	—		37	3
RB Leipzig	2020–21	Bundesliga	28	3	5	0	—		7	1	—		40	4
RB Leipzig	2021–22	Bundesliga	28	1	2	0	—		8 (Note: Six appearances and one goal in UEFA Champions League, two appearances in UEFA Europa League)	1	—		38	2
RB Leipzig	Total		100	8	13	0	—		33	2	—		146	10
Paris Saint-Germain	2022–23	Ligue 1	19	0	1	0	—		4	0	1 (Note: Appearance in Trophée des Champions)	0	25	0
Paris Saint-Germain	2023–24	Ligue 1	16	0	1	0	—		3	0	0	0	20	0
Paris Saint-Germain	Total		35	0	2	0	—		7	0	1	0	45	0
Bayer Leverkusen (loan)	2024–25	Bundesliga	15	1	4	0	—		5	1	—		24	2
Sunderland	2025–26	Premier League	32	3	2	0	1	0	—		—		35	3
Sunderland	2026–27	Premier League	7	0	0	0	0	0	3	0	—		10	0
Sunderland	Total		39	3	2	0	1	0	3	0	—		45	3
Career total			297	15	25	0	10	0	48	3	1	0	381	18

=== International ===
As of match played 7 September 2021

Appearances and goals by national team and year
National team	Year	Apps	Goals
France	2021	1	0
Total		1	0

== Honours ==
RB Leipzig

- DFB-Pokal: 2021–22; runner-up: 2020–21

Paris Saint-Germain

- Ligue 1: 2022–23, 2023–24
- Coupe de France: 2023–24
- Trophée des Champions: 2022, 2023
