= Leandro Paredes =

Argentine footballer (born 1994)

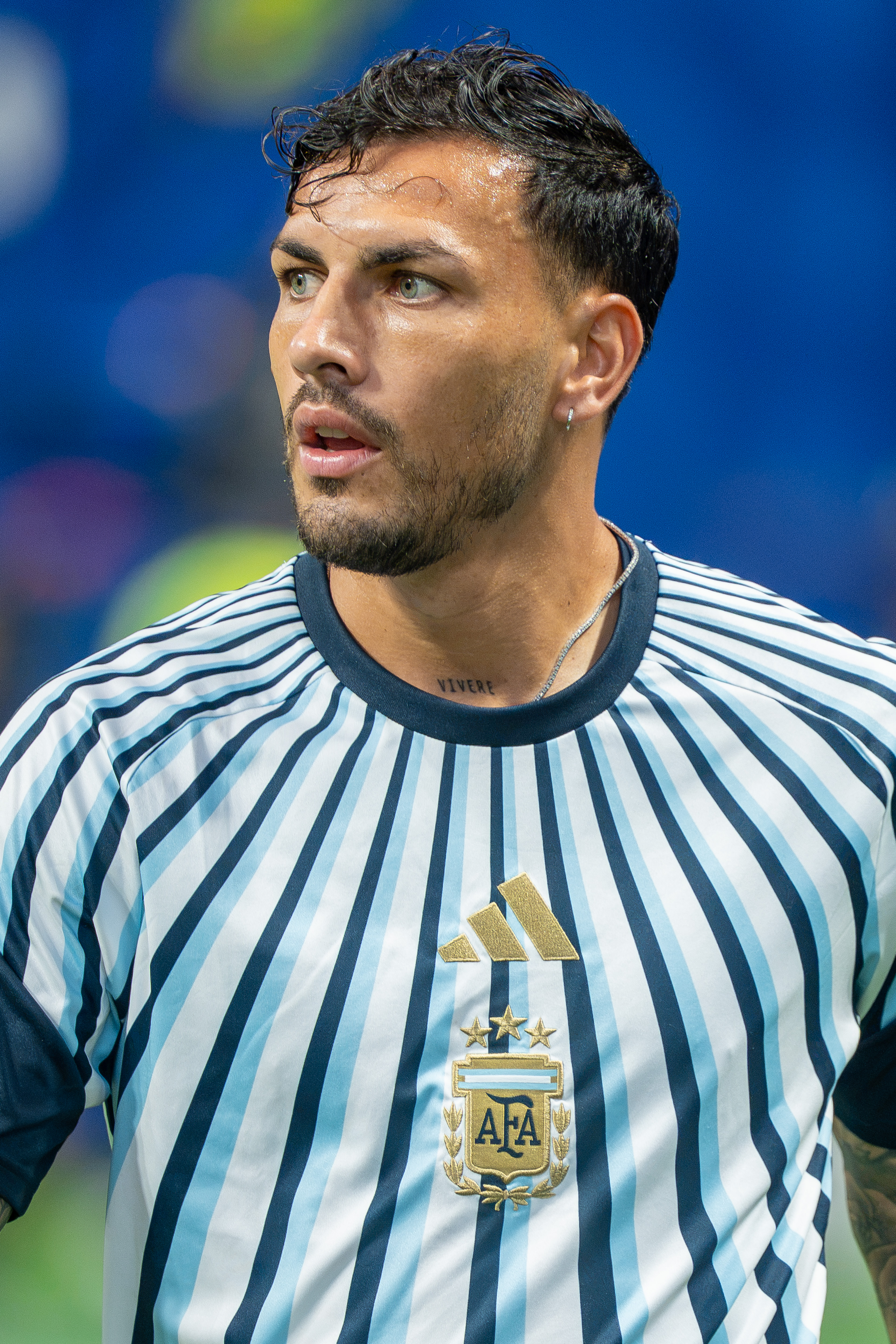
- Paredes with Argentina in 2026

Personal information
- Full name: Leandro Daniel Paredes
- Date of birth: 29 June 1994 (age 32)
- Place of birth: San Justo, Buenos Aires, Argentina
- Height: 1.82 m (6 ft 0 in)
- Position: Defensive midfielder

Team information
- Current team: Boca Juniors
- Number: 5

Youth career
- 2002–2010: Boca Juniors

Senior career*
Years	Team	Apps	(Gls)
2010–2015	Boca Juniors	28	(5)
2014	→ Chievo (loan)	1	(0)
2014–2015	→ Roma (loan)	10	(1)
2015–2017	Roma	27	(3)
2015–2016	→ Empoli (loan)	33	(2)
2017–2019	Zenit Saint Petersburg	43	(7)
2019–2023	Paris Saint-Germain	72	(2)
2022–2023	→ Juventus (loan)	25	(1)
2023–2025	Roma	56	(6)
2025–	Boca Juniors	43	(3)

International career^{‡}
2011	Argentina U17	6	(2)
2017–	Argentina	84	(5)
Medal record
Men's football
Representing Argentina
FIFA World Cup
Winner	2022 Qatar
Runner-up	2026 Canada–Mexico–US
Copa América
Winner	2021 Brazil
Winner	2024 United States
Third place	2019 Brazil
- * Club domestic league appearances and goals as of 23:59, 7 November 2026 (UTC) ‡ National team caps and goals as of 19 July 2026

Leandro Daniel Paredes (Spanish pronunciation: [leˈandɾo paˈɾeðes]; born 29 June 1994) is an Argentine professional footballer who plays as a defensive midfielder for Argentine Primera División club Boca Juniors, which he captains, and the Argentina national team.

A Boca Juniors youth graduate, Paredes made his first-team debut for the club in November 2010. After loan spells to Chievo and Roma between 2014 and 2015, he signed permanently for the latter in July 2015. After moving to Russian side Zenit Saint Petersburg in 2017, he won the 2018–19 Russian Premier League title. In 2019, he moved to Paris Saint-Germain, where he won four Ligue 1 titles before returning to Roma in August 2023. In July 2025, he returned to his childhood club, Boca Juniors.

Paredes is a former Argentine youth international, representing his country at under-17 level. He made his senior debut for the Argentina national team in June 2017, and was later included in the squads for three Copa Américas (2019, 2021, 2024) and two FIFA World Cups (2022, 2026). Paredes won the 2021 and 2024 editions of the Copa América and the 2022 World Cup with Argentina.

== Club career ==
=== Boca Juniors ===
Paredes made his league debut for Boca Juniors in a 2–0 away defeat to Argentinos Juniors on 6 November 2010. On 29 January 2014, he joined Italian Serie A outfit Chievo on loan for the rest of the 2013–14 season. The loan was arranged by fellow Italian side Roma.

=== Roma ===
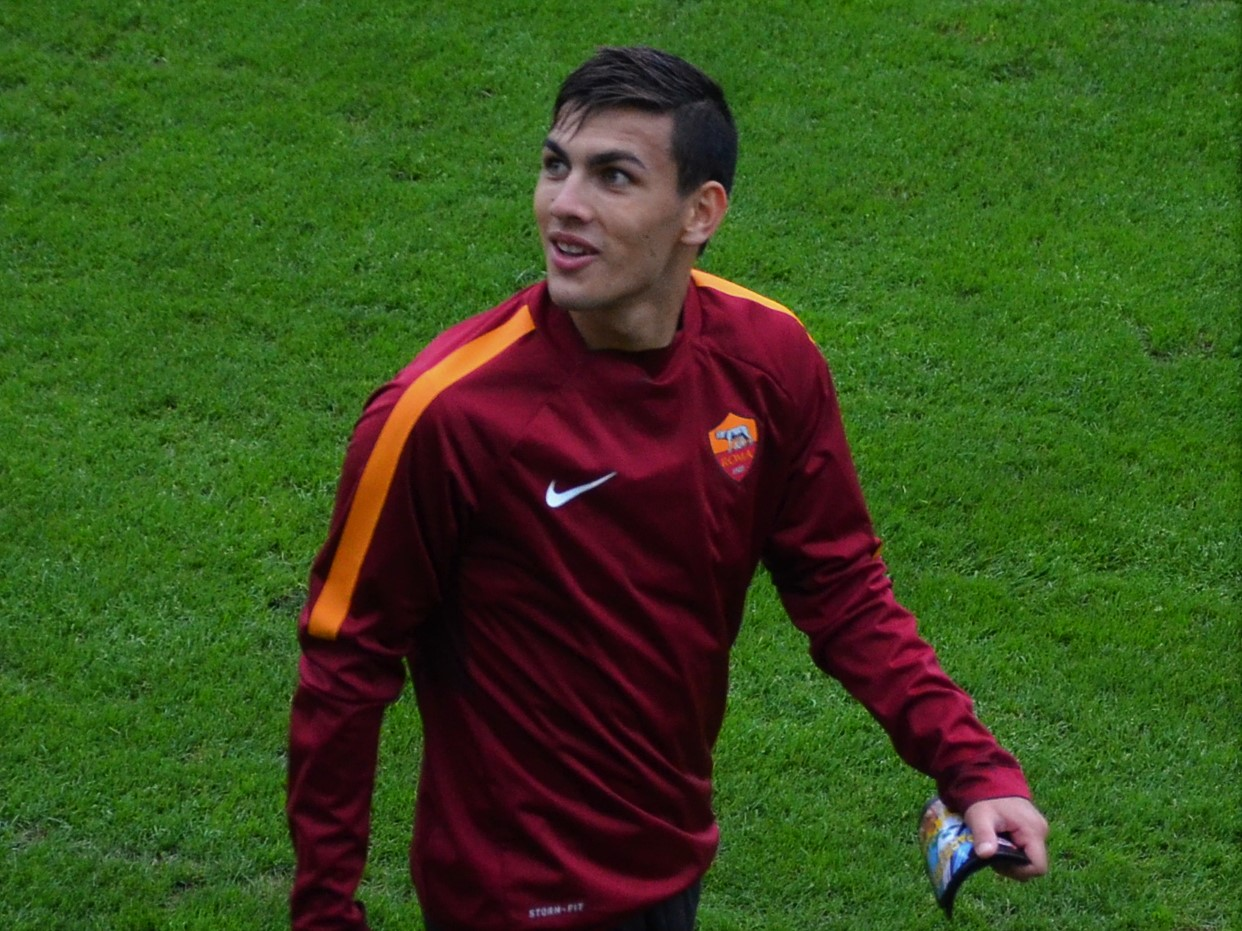
Paredes with Roma in 2014

On 19 July 2014, Paredes joined Roma on loan, with an option to buy outright from Boca Juniors. On 27 September, Paredes made his Roma debut, as a second-half substitute in the 2–0 win against Hellas Verona. On 8 February 2015, Paredes scored his first Roma goal in the club's 2–1 victory against Cagliari. In June 2015, Roma signed Paredes for €6 million.

=== Zenit Saint Petersburg ===
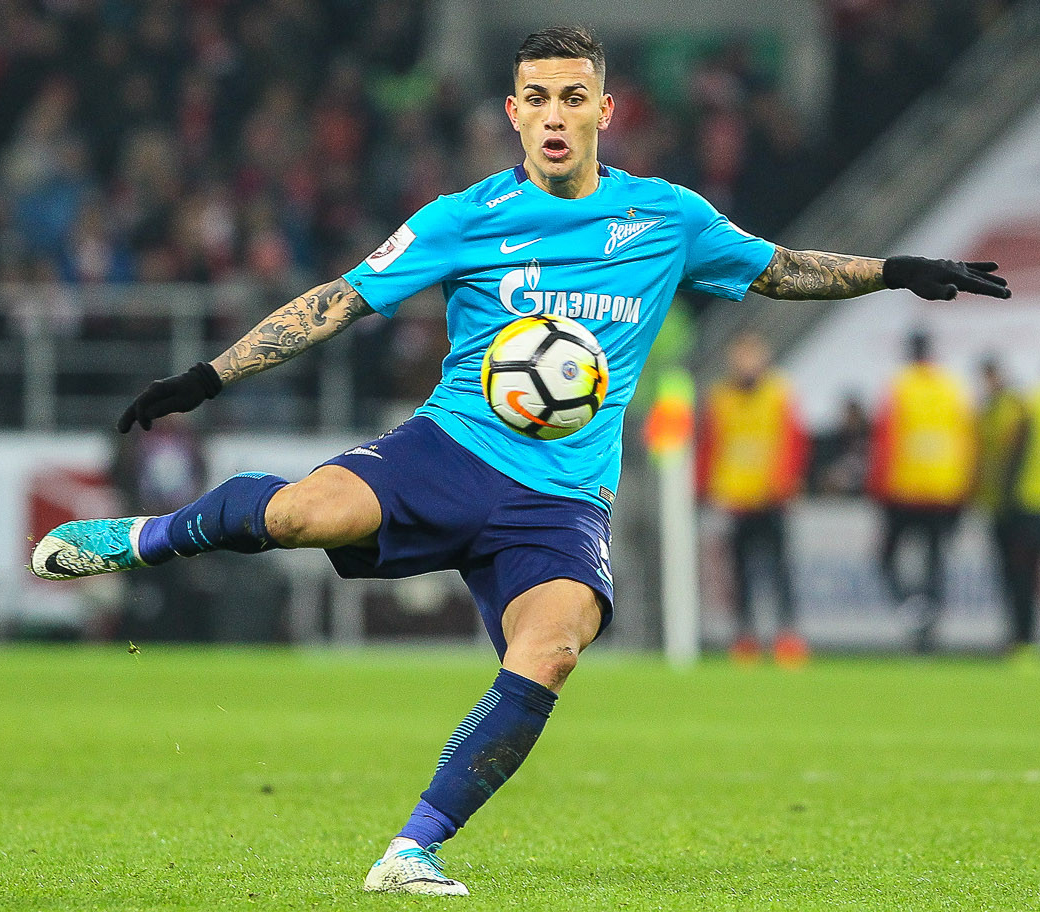
Paredes playing for Zenit Saint Petersburg in 2017

On 1 July 2017, Russian Premier League side Zenit Saint Petersburg announced the signing of Paredes on a four-year contract. The fee was €23 million with a possible €4 million in add-ons. He won the 2018–19 Russian Premier League title with Zenit after a successful first place finish with 64 points.

=== Paris Saint-Germain ===
On 29 January 2019, French club Paris Saint-Germain announced the signing of Paredes on a four-and-a-half-year contract, for an initial €40 million, potentially rising to €47 million. He scored his first goal for the club in a 2–0 victory against Pau in the Coupe de France on 29 January 2020, exactly a year after signing for PSG, while wearing the captain's armband.

On 10 April 2021, Paredes scored his first Ligue 1 goal, a free-kick in a 4–1 win over Strasbourg.

==== Loan to Juventus ====
On 31 August 2022, Paredes joined Serie A club Juventus on a season-long loan from PSG, with an option to buy.

=== Return to Roma ===
On 16 August 2023, Paredes returned to Serie A club Roma, signing a contract until 30 June 2025. A transfer fee in the region of €4 million was reported.

=== Return to Boca Juniors ===
On 11 July 2025, Paredes returned to his boyhood club Boca Juniors, taking the number 5 shirt from Rodrigo Battaglia.

== International career ==
=== Senior debut ===
On 19 May 2017, Paredes received his first senior call-up by newly appointed coach Jorge Sampaoli for Argentina's friendlies against Brazil and Singapore in June. He made his senior international debut in the match against Singapore on 13 June, helping Argentina to a 6–0 away win, and also marked his debut by scoring his first international goal.

=== 2018 FIFA World Cup ===
In May 2018, he was named in Argentina's preliminary 35-man squad for the 2018 FIFA World Cup in Russia but did not make the final 23.

=== 2019 Copa América ===
On 21 May 2019, Paredes was included in Lionel Scaloni's final 23-man Argentina squad for the 2019 Copa América. Following Argentina's third-place achievement, Paredes was listed among the "Best XI" team of the tournament.

=== 2021 Copa América ===
In June 2021, he was included in Lionel Scaloni's final Argentina 28-man squad for the 2021 Copa América. In the semi-finals of the competition on 6 July, Argentina played against Colombia and the match eventually went into a penalty-shootout during which Paredes successfully converted his spot-kick to help Argentina progress to the final. In the final on 10 July, Paredes won his first Copa América title when Argentina defeated Brazil 1–0.

=== 2022 FIFA World Cup ===
On 11 November 2022, Paredes was named in Argentina's final 26-man squad for the 2022 FIFA World Cup. During Argentina's quarterfinal match against the Netherlands on 9 December, Paredes fouled Nathan Aké with a dangerous slide tackle, then deliberately struck the ball into the Dutch substitutes bench, prompting a brawl. Paredes scored in the penalty shootout against the Netherlands, winning 4–3 for Argentina after the game was tied 2–2 after extra-time. On 18 December, Paredes scored the penultimate penalty in the shootout against France in the final, winning the penalty-shootout 4–2, after the game was tied 3–3 after extra-time.

=== 2024 Copa América ===
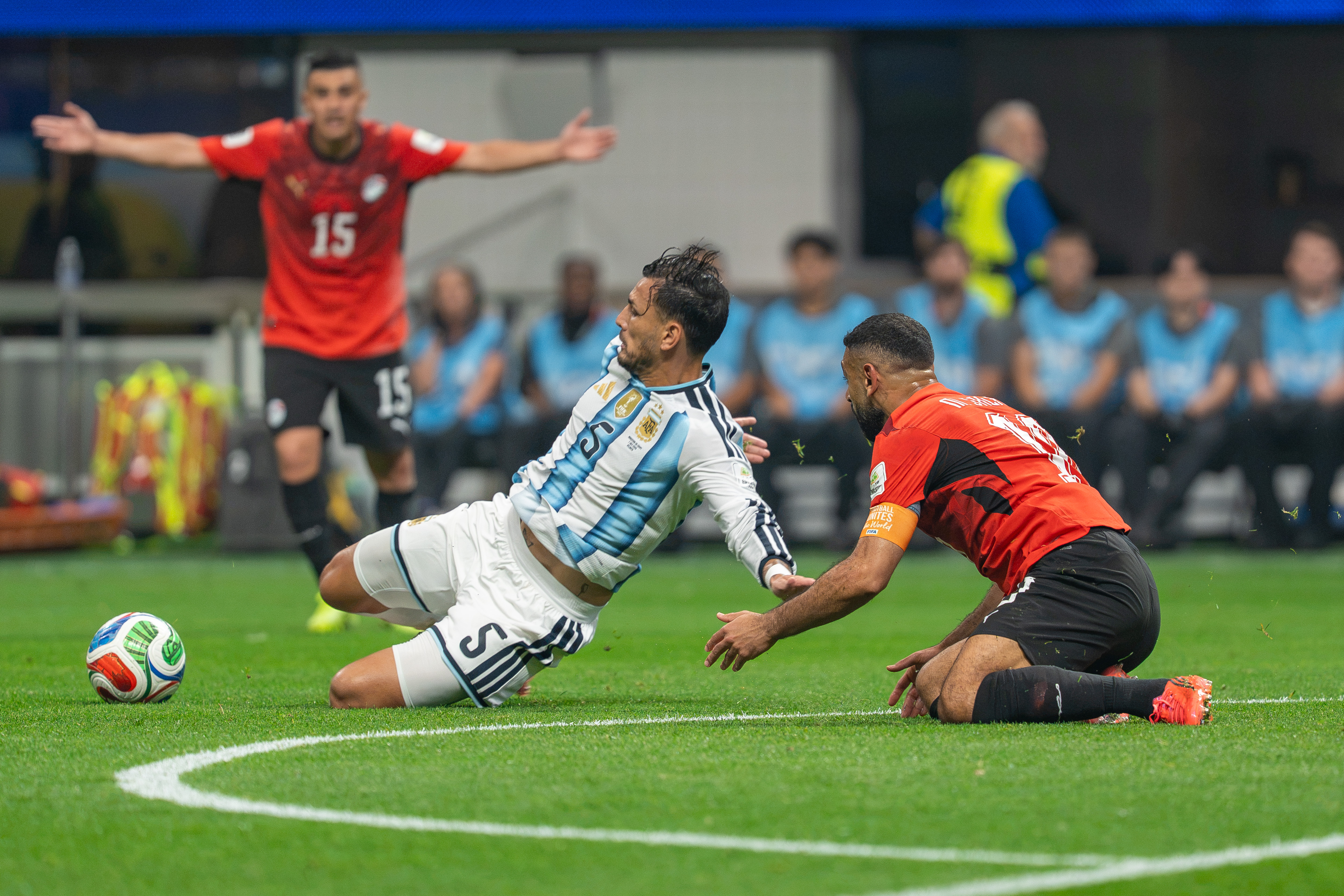
Paredes performing a tackle for Argentina against Egypt at the 2026 FIFA World Cup

In June 2024, Paredes was included in Scaloni's final 26-man Argentina squad for the 2024 Copa América. He made six appearances over the course of the tournament and came on in the 97th minute of Argentina's 1–0 win over Colombia in the final.

=== 2026 FIFA World Cup ===
On 28 May 2026, Paredes was named in Argentina's final 26-man squad for the 2026 FIFA World Cup. Having arrived at the tournament recovering from an injury, his involvement during the group stage was initially limited: he remained an unused substitute against Algeria, made an eight-minute substitute appearance against Austria, and played the full match in Argentina's 3–1 victory over Jordan. He also appeared as a substitute against Cape Verde in the round of 32.

Paredes subsequently became a regular starter in the knockout stages. In the round of 16 match against Egypt, which Argentina won 3–2, he played the full 90 minutes and made a crucial last-man sliding tackle to stop a dangerous Egyptian counterattack in stoppage time, preventing a potential scoring opportunity for Omar Marmoush.

He also started in the quarter-final against Switzerland, where he became involved in a controversial incident with Breel Embolo. After initially being booked for a challenge on the Swiss forward, a VAR review resulted in the referee overturning Paredes's yellow card and booking Embolo for simulation instead. As Embolo had already been cautioned earlier in the match, he was sent off, leaving Switzerland with ten players. Argentina eventually won 3–1 after extra time.

Paredes also started in the semi-final against England, playing 63 minutes as Argentina came from behind to win 2–1 and reach the final. He entered the final against Spain as a substitute in the 75th minute, but Argentina ultimately lost 1–0 after extra time. Following the final whistle, Paredes started a physical altercation against Spain's Eric García and Gavi. Paredes was asked to leave the stadium and the Argentine Football Association faced FIFA disciplinary proceedings. On 29 July, FIFA opened proceedings against him for three counts of assault during the final match. On 21 August he was handed a 10 match ban and fined $90,000 USD for the three assaults.

== Personal life ==
Paredes is married to fellow Argentine Camila Galante, a childhood sweetheart whom he met when he was a teen. They met through Camila's brother, who played football with Paredes at the Boca Juniors youth academy. Paredes had Camila's name tattooed on himself before they started dating. They started dating in 2010 and got married on 28 December 2017. The couple has three children: a daughter named Victoria, and two sons named Giovanni and Lautaro.

His cousin Franco is also a professional footballer.

Paredes is of Paraguayan descent through his mother and speaks fluent Guaraní.

== Career statistics ==
=== Club ===
As of match played 21 November 2026

Appearances and goals by club, season and competition
Club	Season	League			National cup (Note: Includes Copa Argentina, Coppa Italia, Russian Cup, Coupe de France)		League cup (Note: Includes Coupe de la Ligue)		Continental		Other		Total	
Club	Season	Division	Apps	Goals	Apps	Goals	Apps	Goals	Apps	Goals	Apps	Goals	Apps	Goals
Boca Juniors	2010–11	Argentine Primera División	1	0	0	0	—		—		—		1	0
Boca Juniors	2011–12	Argentine Primera División	3	0	1	0	—		0	0	—		4	0
Boca Juniors	2012–13	Argentine Primera División	20	4	0	0	—		1 (Note: Appearance in Copa Sudamericana)	0	1 (Note: Appearance in Supercopa Argentina)	0	22	4
Boca Juniors	2013–14	Argentine Primera División	4	1	0	0	—		0	0	—		4	1
Boca Juniors	Total		28	5	1	0	—		1	0	1	0	31	5
Chievo (loan)	2013–14	Serie A	1	0	0	0	—		—		—		1	0
Roma (loan)	2014–15	Serie A	10	1	2	0	—		1 (Note: Appearance(s) in UEFA Europa League)	0	—		13	1
Roma	2016–17	Serie A	27	3	4	0	—		10 (Note: Two appearances in UEFA Champions League, eight appearances in UEFA Europa League)	0	—		41	3
Roma	Total		37	4	6	0	—		11	0	—		54	4
Empoli (loan)	2015–16	Serie A	33	2	0	0	—		—		—		33	2
Zenit Saint Petersburg	2017–18	Russian Premier League	28	4	1	1	—		10	1	—		39	6
Zenit Saint Petersburg	2018–19	Russian Premier League	15	3	0	0	—		7	1	—		22	4
Zenit Saint Petersburg	Total		43	7	1	1	—		17	2	—		61	10
Paris Saint-Germain	2018–19	Ligue 1	16	0	4	0	—		2 (Note: Appearances in UEFA Champions League)	0	—		22	0
Paris Saint-Germain	2019–20	Ligue 1	17	0	5	1	4	0	6	0	1 (Note: Appearance in Trophée des Champions)	0	33	1
Paris Saint-Germain	2020–21	Ligue 1	21	1	6	0	—		8	0	1	0	36	1
Paris Saint-Germain	2021–22	Ligue 1	15	1	2	0	—		5	0	0	0	22	1
Paris Saint-Germain	2022–23	Ligue 1	3	0	—		—		—		1	0	4	0
Paris Saint-Germain	Total		72	2	17	1	4	0	21	0	3	0	117	3
Juventus (loan)	2022–23	Serie A	25	1	2	0	—		8 (Note: Four appearances in UEFA Champions League, four appearances in UEFA Europa League)	0	—		35	1
Roma	2023–24	Serie A	34	3	2	0	—		13	2	—		49	5
Roma	2024–25	Serie A	22	3	2	0	—		8	1	—		32	4
Roma	Total		56	6	4	0	—		21	3	—		81	9
Boca Juniors	2025	Argentine Primera División	17	1	1	0	—		—		—		18	1
Boca Juniors	2026	Argentine Primera División	26	2	3	0	—		13 (Note: Six appearances and one goal in Copa Libertadores, seven appearances and one goal in Copa Sudamericana)	2	—		42	4
Boca Juniors	Total		43	3	4	0	—		13	2	—		60	5
Career total			338	30	35	2	4	0	92	7	4	0	473	39

=== International ===
As of match played 19 July 2026

Appearances and goals by national team and year
National team	Year	Apps	Goals
Argentina	2017	2	1
Argentina	2018	7	0
Argentina	2019	15	2
Argentina	2020	4	0
Argentina	2021	13	1
Argentina	2022	10	0
Argentina	2023	7	1
Argentina	2024	11	0
Argentina	2025	6	0
Argentina	2026	8	0
Total		84	5

Scores and results list Argentina's goal tally first, score column indicates score after each Paredes goal.

List of international goals scored by Leandro Paredes
No.	Date	Venue	Opponent	Score	Result	Competition
1	13 June 2017	National Stadium, Kallang, Singapore	Singapore	4–0	6–0	Friendly
2	10 September 2019	Alamodome, San Antonio, United States	Mexico	3–0	4–0	Friendly
3	13 October 2019	Estadio Manuel Martínez Valero, Alicante, Spain	Ecuador	3–0	6–1	Friendly
4	8 June 2021	Estadio Metropolitano Roberto Meléndez, Barranquilla, Colombia	Colombia	2–0	2–2	2022 FIFA World Cup qualification
5	19 June 2023	Gelora Bung Karno Stadium, Jakarta, Indonesia	Indonesia	1–0	2–0	Friendly

== Honours ==
Boca Juniors

- Copa Sudamericana: 2026
- Argentine Primera División: Apertura 2011, 2026 Liga
- Copa Argentina: 2011–12

Zenit Saint Petersburg

- Russian Premier League: 2018–19

Paris Saint-Germain

- Ligue 1: 2018–19, 2019–20, 2021–22, 2022–23
- Coupe de France: 2019–20, 2020–21; runner-up: 2018–19
- Coupe de la Ligue: 2019–20
- Trophée des Champions: 2019, 2020, 2022
- UEFA Champions League runner-up: 2019–20

Argentina

- FIFA World Cup: 2022; runner-up: 2026
- Copa América: 2021, 2024
- CONMEBOL–UEFA Cup of Champions: 2022

Individual

- Copa América Team of the Tournament: 2019
