= 2022 Trophée des Champions =

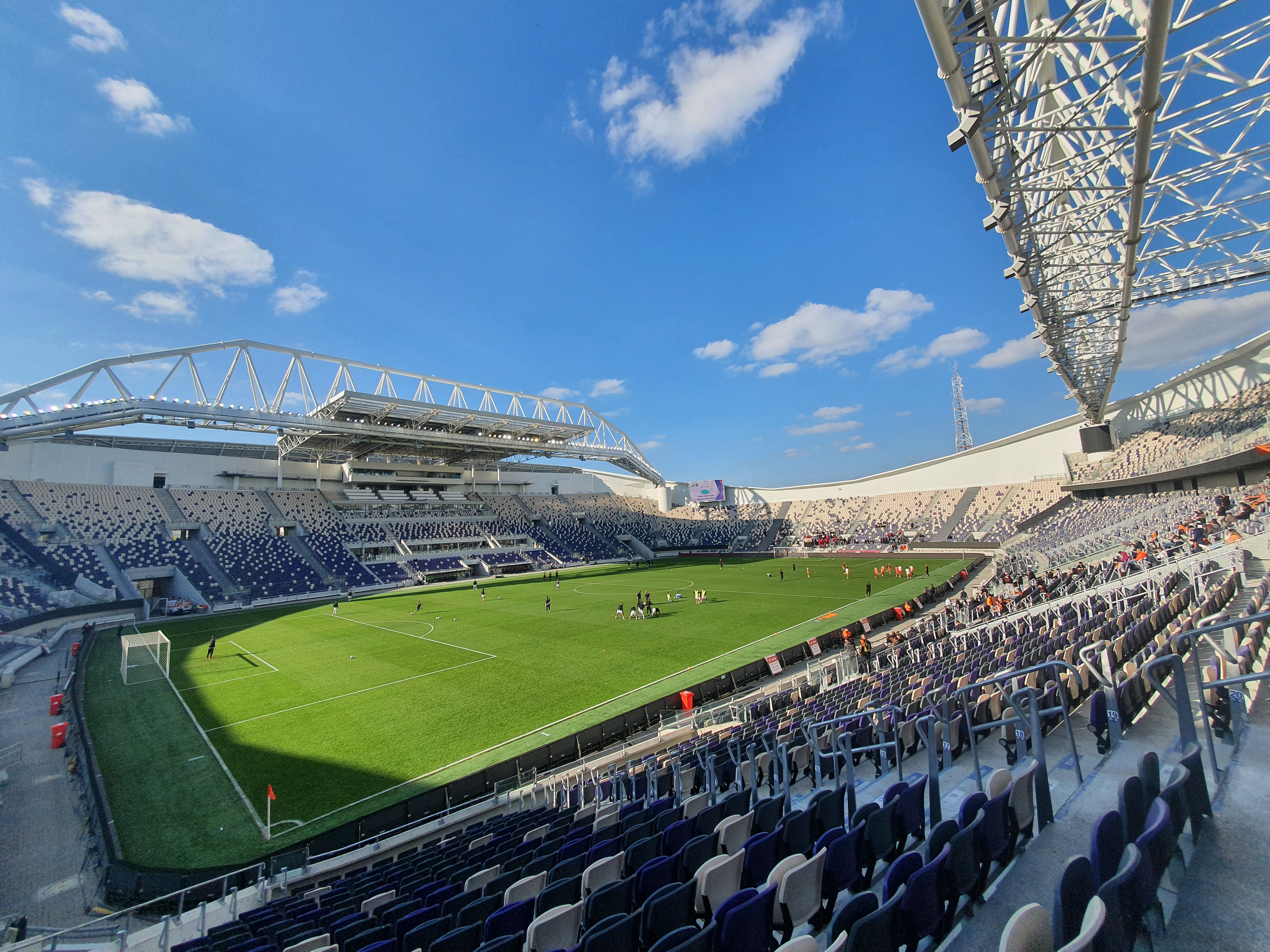
- Bloomfield Stadium in Tel Aviv hosted the match.
- Event: Trophée des Champions
Paris Saint-Germain	Nantes
4	0
- Date: 31 July 2022
- Venue: Bloomfield Stadium, Tel Aviv, Israel
- Man of the Match: Lionel Messi (Paris Saint-Germain)
- Referee: Orel Grinfeld (Israel)
- Attendance: 28,000

The 2022 Trophée des Champions was the 27th edition of the French Super Cup. The match was contested by the 2021–22 Ligue 1 champions, Paris Saint-Germain, and the 2021–22 Coupe de France winners, Nantes. It took place at Bloomfield Stadium in Tel Aviv, Israel on 31 July 2022.

Paris Saint-Germain won the match 4–0 for their record eleventh Trophée des Champions title.

== Criticism ==
The decision to play the match in Israel received criticism from the BDS movement in France.

== Match ==
=== Details ===
31 July 2022
21:00 CEST

Paris Saint-Germain	4–0	Nantes
Messi 22'; Neymar 45+5', 82' (pen.); Ramos 57'	Report

Bloomfield Stadium, Tel Aviv
Attendance: 28,000
Referee: Orel Grinfeld (Israel)

Paris Saint-Germain	Nantes

GK	99	(Italy) Gianluigi Donnarumma
CB	4	(Spain) Sergio Ramos
CB	5	(Brazil) Marquinhos (c)
CB	3	(France) Presnel Kimpembe
RM	2	(Morocco) Achraf Hakimi		(substituted off) 78'
CM	6	(Italy) Marco Verratti		(substituted off) 78'
CM	17	(Portugal) Vitinha	(yellow card) 16'	(substituted off) 68'
LM	25	(Portugal) Nuno Mendes		(substituted off) 68'
RW	19	(Spain) Pablo Sarabia		(substituted off) 84'
CF	30	(Argentina) Lionel Messi
LW	10	(Brazil) Neymar
Substitutes:
GK	1	(Costa Rica) Keylor Navas
DF	14	(Spain) Juan Bernat		(substituted on) 68'
DF	22	(Senegal) Abdou Diallo
DF	26	(France) Nordi Mukiele		(substituted on) 78'
MF	8	(Argentina) Leandro Paredes		(substituted on) 78'
MF	15	(Portugal) Danilo Pereira		(substituted on) 68'
MF	27	(Senegal) Idrissa Gueye
FW	9	(Argentina) Mauro Icardi
FW	29	(France) Arnaud Kalimuendo		(substituted on) 84'
Manager:
(France) Christophe Galtier

GK	1	(France) Alban Lafont (c)
CB	21	(Cameroon) Jean-Charles Castelletto	(red card) 81'
CB	3	(Brazil) Andrei Girotto
CB	4	(France) Nicolas Pallois
RM	11	(France) Marcus Coco	(yellow card) 38'	(substituted off) 64'
CM	17	(France) Moussa Sissoko
CM	5	(Spain) Pedro Chirivella		(substituted off) 64'
LM	12	(France) Dennis Appiah		(substituted off) 78'
AM	10	(France) Ludovic Blas
CF	7	(France) Evann Guessand		(substituted off) 78'
CF	27	(Nigeria) Moses Simon
Substitutes:
GK	16	(France) Rémy Descamps
DF	2	(Brazil) Fábio		(substituted on) 78'
DF	24	(France) Sébastien Corchia		(substituted on) 78'
MF	8	(Democratic Republic of the Congo) Samuel Moutoussamy	(yellow card) 75'	(substituted on) 64'
MF	18	(France) Samuel Yepié Yepié
MF	19	(France) Mohamed Achi
MF	20	(France) Lohann Doucet
MF	29	(France) Quentin Merlin
FW	31	(Egypt) Mostafa Mohamed		(substituted on) 64'
Manager:
(France) Antoine Kombouaré

Man of the Match:
Lionel Messi (Paris Saint-Germain)

Assistant referees:
Roy Hassan (Israel)
Idan Yarkoni (Israel)
Fourth official:
Gal Leibovitz (Israel)
Video assistant referee:
Roi Reinshreiber (Israel)
Assistant video assistant referee:
David Fuxman (Israel)

Match rules

- 90 minutes.
- Penalty shoot-out if scores level.
- Nine named substitutes, of which up to five may be used. (Note: Each team was given only three opportunities to make substitutions, excluding substitutions made at half-time.)

== See also ==
- 2022–23 Ligue 1
- 2022–23 Coupe de France
- 2022–23 FC Nantes season
- 2022–23 Paris Saint-Germain FC season
