= Samuel Noireau-Dauriat =

Malagasy footballer (born 2003)

Personal information
- Date of birth: 1 January 2004 (age 22)
- Place of birth: Brive-la-Gaillarde, France
- Height: 1.86 m (6 ft 1 in)
- Position: Winger

Team information
- Current team: Caen
- Number: 8

Youth career
- 2008–2011: ESA Brive
- 2011–2012: AS Brive
- 2012–2013: ASV Malemort
- 2013: Toulouse
- 2014: ASPTT Colomiers
- 2014–2015: FACC Carcassonne
- 2016–2017: FU Narbonne
- 2017–2018: Montauban
- 2018–2021: Paris Saint-Germain

Senior career*
Years	Team	Apps	(Gls)
2021–2023	Paris Saint-Germain II	1	(0)
2022	→ SPAL (loan)	0	(0)
2022–2023	→ C'Chartres II (loan)	4	(1)
2022–2023	→ C'Chartres (loan)	4	(0)
2023–2024	Saran	3	(0)
2024–2025	Guingamp II	24	(10)
2025–	Caen II	13	(6)
2025–	Caen	2	(0)

International career^{‡}
2025–	Madagascar	1	(0)
- * Club domestic league appearances and goals as of 23 June 2026 ‡ National team caps and goals as of 13:25, 27 October 2025 (UTC)

Samuel Noireau-Dauriat (born 1 January 2003) is a professional football player who plays as a winger for Championnat National club Caen. Born in France, he plays for the Madagascar national team.

== Club career ==
Noireau is a product of the youth academies of the French clubs ESA Brive, AS Brive, ASV Malemort, Toulouse, Toulouse, ASPTT Colomiers, Montauban, and Paris Saint-Germain. On 21 June 2021 he signed his first professional contract with Paris Saint-Germain, and was promoted to their reserves. On 25 January 2022, he joined the Italian club SPAL on a short-term loan. On 10 September 2023, he joined C'Chartres on a season-long loan. In 2023 he had a short stint with Saran, and on 31 January 2024 moved to the reserves of Guingam. On 26 June 2025, he joined Caen.

== International career ==
Born in France, Noireau was born to a Malagasy father and French mother and holds dual French and Malagasy citizenship. He was called up to the Madagascar national team for a set of 2026 FIFA World Cup qualification matches in March 2025.
