= 2025–26 SD Eibar season =

SD Eibar
2025–26 season
- Manager: Beñat San José
- Stadium: Ipurua Municipal Stadium
- Segunda División: 8th
- Copa del Rey: Round of 32
- Top goalscorer: League: Javier Martón (2); All: Javier Martón (2)
- Biggest win: Eibar 3–0 Granada
Home colours	Away colours	Third colours

== Squad ==
=== Transfers In ===
Pos.	Player	Transferred from	Fee	Date	Source
FW	(Spain) Javier Martón	(Spain) Athletic Bilbao	Undisclosed	16 July 2025	
DF	(Portugal) Jair Amador	(Spain) Zaragoza	Free	22 July 2025	
DF	(Portugal) Leonardo Buta	(Italy) Udinese	Loan	24 July 2025	
DF	(Spain) Álvaro Rodríguez	(Spain) Albacete	Free	9 August 2025	
MF	(Spain) Adu Ares	(Spain) Athletic Bilbao	Free	17 August 2025	

=== Transfers Out ===
Pos.	Player	Transferred to	Fee	Date	Source
MF	(Brazil) Matheus Pereira	(Brazil) Fortaleza	Free	27 May 2025	
FW	(Spain) Jorge Pascual	(Spain) Villarreal	Loan return	30 June 2025	
DF	(Spain) Álex Domínguez	(France) Toulouse	Loan return	30 June 2025	
MF	(Spain) Iván Gil	(Spain) Las Palmas	Loan return	30 June 2025	
DF	(Spain) Arnau Comas	(Switzerland) Basel	Loan return	30 June 2025	
MF	(Spain) Martín Merquelanz		End of contract	1 July 2025	
DF	(Spain) Chema	(Spain) Racing Ferrol	End of contract	1 July 2025	
DF	(Spain) Álvaro Carrillo	(Spain) Huesca	Contract terminated	5 August 2025	

== Competitions ==
=== Overall record ===
Competition	First match	Last match	Starting round	Record							
Competition	First match	Last match	Starting round	Pld	W	D	L	GF	GA	GD	Win %
Segunda División	16 August 2025		Matchday 1	5	2	1	2	7	4	+3	40.00
Copa del Rey				0	0	0	0	0	0	+0	—
Total				5	2	1	2	7	4	+3	40.00

Last updated: 13 September 2025
Source: Competitions

=== Segunda División ===
==== League table ====
Pos	Team	Pld	W	D	L	GF	GA	GD	Pts	Qualification or relegation
6	Castellón	42	20	12	10	70	51	+19	72 (Note: Castellón finished ahead of Burgos on head-to-head points: Castellón 3–1 Burgos, Burgos 0–0 Castellón.)	Qualification for promotion play-offs
7	Burgos	42	20	12	10	48	33	+15	72	
8	Eibar	42	19	10	13	52	40	+12	67	
9	Córdoba	42	17	10	15	57	61	−4	61 (Note: Tied on head-to-head points. Head-to-head goal difference: Córdoba +1, Sporting Gijón 0, Ceuta –1.)	
10	Sporting Gijón	42	18	7	17	60	54	+6	61	

Source: LaLiga Hypermotion
Rules for classification: 1) Points; 2) Head-to-head points; 3) Head-to-head goal difference; 4) Goal difference; 5) Goals scored; 6) Fair-play points
(Note: Head-to-head record is used only after all the matches between the teams in question have been played)

==== Results summary ====
Overall								Home						Away					
Pld	W	D	L	GF	GA	GD	Pts	W	D	L	GF	GA	GD	W	D	L	GF	GA	GD
5	2	1	2	7	4	+3	7	2	0	0	5	0	+5	0	1	2	2	4	−2

Last updated: 13 September 2025.

==== Results by round ====
Round	1	2	3	4	5
Ground	A	H	A	H	A
Result	D	W	L	W	L
Position					

Updated to match(es) played on 13 September 2025. Source:
A = Away; H = Home; W = Win; D = Draw; L = Loss

==== Matches ====
16 August 2025 1	Málaga	1–1	Eibar	Málaga
19:13	Niño 64'	Report	Martón 52'	Stadium: La Rosaleda; Attendance: 24,819; Referee: Saúl Ais Reig

22 August 2025 2	Eibar	3–0	Granada	Eibar
19:30	Martón 22'; Arbilla 60'; Rodríguez 70'	Report		Stadium: Ipurua Municipal Stadium; Referee: Carlos Muñiz Muñoz

1 September 2025 3	Huesca	2–1	Eibar	Huesca
19:30	Carrillo 19', (yellow card) 76'; Arribas (yellow card) 27'; Enrich 90+5'	Report	Magunazelaia 23'; Rodríguez Pérez (yellow card) 90'; Arbilla (red card) 90+3'	Stadium: Estadio El Alcoraz; Referee: Sergiu Claudiu Muresan

8 September 2025 4	Eibar	2–0	Andorra	Eibar
20:30	Corpas (penalty missed) 28'; Cubero 53'; Martínez 79'			Stadium: Ipurua Municipal Stadium; Referee: Manuel Jesús Orellana

13 September 2025 5	Cádiz	1–0	Eibar	Cádiz
16:15 UTC+2		Report		Stadium: Nuevo Mirandilla

21 September 2025 6	Eibar	v	Real Sociedad B	Eibar
18:30				Stadium: Ipurua Municipal Stadium
