= Philippe N'Dioro =

French footballer (born 1962)

Personal information
- Date of birth: 24 June 1962 (age 64)
- Place of birth: Moulins, France
- Position: Forward

Senior career*
Years	Team	Apps	(Gls)
1978–1980	CO Le Puy		
1980–1984	Lyon	58	(15)
1984–1985	CO Le Puy	15	(0)
1985–1986	Limoges FC	33	(14)
1986–1989	Nice	63	(7)
1989–1990	Red Star	10	(0)
1990–1991	Nice	3	(0)
- * Club domestic league appearances and goals

Philippe N'Dioro (born 24 June 1962) is a French former professional footballer who played as a forward. He made 94 appearances and scored 13 goals in Ligue 1 for Olympique Lyonnais and OGC Nice between 1980 and 1991.
