= Mathyas Randriamamy =

Footballer (born 2003)

Personal information
- Full name: Mathyas Todisoa François Randriamamy
- Date of birth: 23 April 2003 (age 23)
- Place of birth: Clamart, France
- Height: 1.86 m (6 ft 1 in)
- Position: Goalkeeper

Team information
- Current team: The Football Circle

Youth career
- 2013–2016: Paris FC
- 2016–2021: Paris Saint-Germain

Senior career*
Years	Team	Apps	(Gls)
2021–2022	Paris Saint-Germain B	1	(0)
2022–2023	Paris Saint-Germain	0	(0)
2023	→ Sète (loan)	1	(0)
2023–2024	Ermis Aradippou	17	(0)
2025	Kerry	3	(0)
2025–	The Football Circle		

International career^{‡}
2021	Madagascar	1	(0)
- * Club domestic league appearances and goals as of 13 November 2025 ‡ National team caps and goals as of 13 November 2025

Mathyas Todisoa François Randriamamy (born 23 April 2003) is a professional footballer who plays as a goalkeeper for UAE Third Division League club The Football Circle. Born in France, he has played for the Madagascar national team.

== Club career ==
Born in France to parents of Malagasy descent, Randriamamy started his youth career with Paris FC. He joined Paris Saint-Germain (PSG) in 2016. On 16 August 2021, he signed his first professional contract with the club.

On 24 January 2023, Randriamamy joined Championnat National 2 club Sète on loan until the end of the season. On 4 September 2023, he joined Cypriot club Ermis Aradippou.

On 20 February 2025, it was announced that he had signed for League of Ireland First Division club Kerry. He made 4 appearances in all competitions before on 29 July 2025, Kerry announced that Radriamamy, along with teammate Shane Maroodza, had been released by the club, stating "Unfortunately, their values and principles didn't match the standards of the club".

After leaving Kerry, he signed for UAE Third Division League club The Football Circle in October 2025.

== International career ==
On 22 October 2020, Randriamamy received his first call-up from the Madagascar national team for 2021 Africa Cup of Nations qualification matches against Ivory Coast. He made his debut on 10 October 2021 in a 1–0 FIFA World Cup qualifier win against DR Congo.

== Career statistics ==
=== Club ===
As of match played on 25 July 2025

Appearances and goals by club, season and competition
Club	Season	League			National Cup		Total	
Club	Season	Division	Apps	Goals	Apps	Goals	Apps	Goals
Paris Saint-Germain B	2021–22	Championnat National 3	1	0	—		1	0
Sète (loan)	2022–23	Championnat National 2	1	0	0	0	1	0
Ermis Aradippou	2023–24	Cypriot Second Division	17	0	0	0	17	0
Kerry	2025	League of Ireland First Division	3	0	1	0	4	0
Career total			22	0	1	0	23	0

=== International ===
As of match played 10 October 2021

Appearances and goals by national team and year
National team	Year	Apps	Goals
Madagascar	2021	1	0
Madagascar	2022	0	0
Madagascar	2023	0	0
Total		1	0
