= Anfane Ahamada =

Footballer (born 2002)

Personal information
- Full name: Anfane Ahamada M'Ze
- Date of birth: 7 May 2002 (age 24)
- Place of birth: Villepinte, France
- Height: 1.81 m (5 ft 11 in)
- Position: Defensive midfielder

Youth career
- 2011–2015: Espérance Aulnaysienne
- 2015–2022: Paris Saint-Germain

Senior career*
Years	Team	Apps	(Gls)
2022–2023	Paris Saint-Germain II	1	(0)
2022–2023	→Martigues (loan)	4	(0)
2024	Racing Club de France	1	(0)
2024–2025	Lyon-La Duchère	25	(0)
2025–2026	Villefranche	17	(0)

International career^{‡}
2022	Comoros U20	2	(0)
2025–	Comoros	3	(0)
- * Club domestic league appearances and goals as of 23 June 2026 ‡ National team caps and goals as of 18:26, 3 September 2025 (UTC)

Anfane Ahamada M'Ze (born 5 July 2002) is a professional footballer who plays as a defensive midfielder. Born in France, he plays for the Comoros national team.

== Club career ==
Ahamada is a product of the youth academies of the French clubs Espérance Aulnaysienne and Paris Saint-Germain. On 3 July 2020, Ahamada signed his first professional contract with Paris Saint-Germain until 2023. On 1 September 2022, he joined Martigues on loan in the Championnat National for the 2022–23 season. After being released by Paris Saint-German in 2023, he joined Racing Club de France on 16 February 2024 in the Championnat National 2. On 23 June 2025, he transferred to Villefranche in the Championnat National.

== International career ==
Born in France, Ahamada is of Comorian descent and holds dual French-Comorian citizenship. In June 2022, he was called up to the Comoros U20s for the 2022 Maurice Revello Tournament managed by Samirdine Youssouf. He was called up to the Comoros national team for a set of 2026 FIFA World Cup qualification matches in September 2025.
