= Hervé Guégan =

French footballer

Personal information
- Full name: Hervé Guégan
- Place of birth: Quimperlé, France
- Height: 1.72 m (5 ft 7 1/2 in)
- Position: Midfielder

Senior career*
Years	Team	Apps	(Gls)
1980–1981	Quimper	10	(1)
1981–1984	Angers	83	(18)
1984–1986	Guingamp	66	(25)
1986–1989	Brest	80	(15)
1989–1991	Chamois Niortais	31	(0)
1991–1997	Lorient	107	(7)
- * Club domestic league appearances and goals

Hervé Guégan is a French former professional footballer who played as a defensive midfielder.
