= Oluwatosin =

Oluwatosin may refer to:

== Name ==
- Tosin (given name)

== People ==
=== First name ===
- Oluwatosin Demehin (born 2002), Nigerian women's football defender
- Oluwatosin Michael Eniolorunda (born 1985), Nigerian software engineer and entrepreneur
- Oluwatosin Olajide Kupoluyi, Nigerian actor and stand-up comedian
- Oluwatosin Olatujoye (born 1987), Nigerian businessman
- Oluwatosin Oluwole Ajibade (born 1991), Nigerian singer and songwriter
- Oluwatosin Otubajo (born 1984), Nigerian former footballer

=== Middle name ===
- Abdul-Nasir Oluwatosin Abarabioyo (born 1991), English professional footballer
- Adeloye Oluwatosin (born 1996), Nigerian sprinter
- Adetayo Oluwatosin Olusegun Edun (born 1998), English professional footballer
- Gilbert Oluwatosin Jesse (1937-2003), factional pastor
- Jeremiah Oluwatosin Ayotunde Emmanuel (born 1999), entrepreneur and youth activist
