= Victor Osimhen =

Nigerian footballer (born 1998)

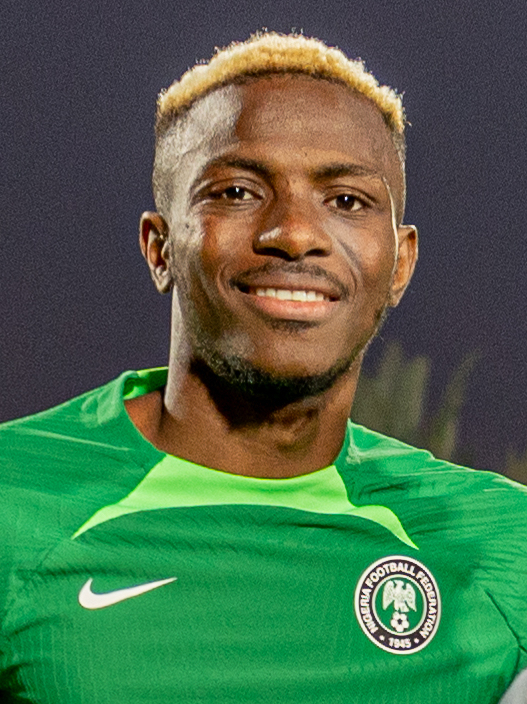
- Osimhen with Nigeria in 2024

Personal information
- Full name: Victor James Osimhen
- Date of birth: 29 December 1998 (age 27)
- Place of birth: Lagos State, Nigeria
- Height: 1.86 m (6 ft 1 in)
- Position: Striker

Team information
- Current team: Galatasaray
- Number: 45

Youth career
- –2017: Ultimate Strikers Academy

Senior career*
| Years | Team | Apps | (Gls) |
| 2017–2019 | VfL Wolfsburg | 14 | (0) |
| 2018–2019 | → Charleroi (loan) | 25 | (12) |
| 2019 | Charleroi | 0 | (0) |
| 2019–2020 | Lille | 27 | (13) |
| 2020–2025 | Napoli | 108 | (65) |
| 2024–2025 | → Galatasaray (loan) | 30 | (26) |
| 2025– | Galatasaray | 29 | (23) |

International career^{‡}
| 2015 | Nigeria U17 | 13 | (14) |
| 2015–2019 | Nigeria U23 | 4 | (3) |
| 2017– | Nigeria | 51 | (35) |
Medal record
Men's football
Representing Nigeria
Africa Cup of Nations
| Runner-up | 2023 |
| Third place | 2019 |
| Third place | 2025 |
U-23 Africa Cup of Nations
| Winner | 2015 |
FIFA U-17 World Cup
| Winner | 2015 |
- * Club domestic league appearances and goals as of 20:50, 30 October 2026 (UTC) ‡ National team caps and goals as of 22:30, 14 January 2026 (UTC)

Victor James Osimhen MFR MON (born 29 December 1998) is a Nigerian professional footballer who plays as a striker for Süper Lig club Galatasaray and is the vice-captain of the Nigeria national team. Widely Regarded as one of the best strikers in the world and one of the greatest African footballers of all time, Osimhen is known for his pace, physical strength, aerial ability, and finishing.

Born in Nigeria, Osimhen began his senior career in Germany at VfL Wolfsburg in 2017. Following a season and a half at the club, he moved to Belgian side Charleroi on loan in 2018–19, before moving to Ligue 1 with Lille, scoring eighteen goals in his sole season with the French club.

In 2020, Osimhen transferred to Serie A side Napoli for a club-record fee of €80 million and won the Serie A Best Young Player award in the 2021–22 season. In the following campaign, he finished as the league's top scorer with 26 goals, a record-high for an African player, as he helped Napoli win a first Serie A title in 33 years. For his efforts, he won the league's Best Striker award, prior to being named Serie A Footballer of the Year a few months later. Following a dispute with the club's board, Osimhen was loaned to Turkish side Galatasaray ahead of the 2024–25 season, where he finished as the league's top scorer and won a domestic double, before moving permanently for a league record fee.

Osimhen won the Golden Boot award at the 2015 FIFA U-17 World Cup, which Nigeria won. He made his senior international debut in June 2017, and played at the Africa Cup of Nations in 2019, 2023 and 2025, reaching the final of the 2023 competition. He is currently the second all-time highest goalscorer of the Nigeria national team. On 29 May 2023, Osimhen was made a Member of the Federal Republic by President Muhammadu Buhari.

Osimhen finished in eighth place at the 2023 Ballon d'Or ceremony, becoming the first Nigerian to make the top ten of the French award. He was also named the African Footballer of the Year at the 2023 CAF Awards, the first Nigerian to receive this honour since Nwankwo Kanu in 1999.

== Early life ==
Osimhen was born on 29 December 1998 in Lagos, Nigeria, as the youngest of seven children. His father Patrick was from Esan in Edo State while his mother Christiana was from Amai, Ukwuani area in Delta State. He was raised in the Olusosun area of Lagos, a densely populated community located near one of the city's largest landfills. His early life was marked by poverty and hardship; Osimhen sold sachet water ("pure water") and other items in Lagos traffic to help support his family after the death of his mother and his father’s job loss.

He developed a passion for football from a young age, often playing barefoot on the streets with improvised balls. Osimhen attended Olusosun Primary School, where his football talent began to draw attention. He later joined Ultimate Strikers Academy, a local football academy in Lagos, where his skills were nurtured and eventually led to his discovery by national team scouts.

His breakthrough came in 2015 when he was selected to represent Nigeria at the FIFA U-17 World Cup in Chile, where he emerged as the tournament’s top scorer with 10 goals and helped Nigeria win the title. Osimhen has often cited Didier Drogba as his idol and a major inspiration in his football career.

== Club career ==
Osimhen started his career at the Ultimate Strikers Academy, based in Lagos, Nigeria. In January 2016, after being noticed for his performances at the 2015 FIFA U-17 World Cup, Osimhen committed to a pre-contract with VfL Wolfsburg, stipulating that he would officially join the club in January 2017.

=== VfL Wolfsburg ===
==== 2017–18: First seasons in Europe ====
On 5 January 2017, Osimhen officially signed a three-and-a-half-year deal with the club, lasting until June 2020. Out with an injury upon his arrival, he made his Bundesliga debut for Wolfsburg on 13 May, coming on as a substitute in the 59th minute in a 1–1 draw against Borussia Mönchengladbach. Osimhen also came on the following week in a pivotal relegation tie against Hamburger SV, on what was the final match day of the 2016–17 season. He replaced defender Sebastian Jung with the score tied 1–1, and Hamburg scored a late winner to pass Wolfsburg in the table, sending Wolfsburg to a relegation playoff with Eintracht Braunschweig. Osimhen was in the squad for both matches, receiving a cameo at the end of the second leg with Wolfsburg's participation in the next Bundesliga confirmed, as they won 2–0 on aggregate.

Osimhen was named in 12 of the 17 matchday squads in the first half of the 2017–18 season, appearing in 5 games. He earned his full Bundesliga debut on 28 January 2018 against Hannover, playing the full 90 minutes in their 1–0 win. Osimhen made two more starts for the rest of the campaign, playing the full match against Werder Bremen on 11 February and being replaced at the half by Daniel Didavi against Hertha Berlin on 31 March. Wolfsburg were again in the relegation playoff, but Osimhen missed out through injury. He also appeared in one game of Wolfsburg's DFB Pokal campaign, replacing midfielder Josuha Guilavogui for the last ten minutes of their 1–0 defeat to Schalke in the quarter-final. Osimhen underwent shoulder surgery on 2 May, ending his season with 12 appearances in the Bundesliga to his name.

=== Charleroi ===
==== 2018–19: Loan to Charleroi ====
Osimhen had summer trials with Belgian clubs Zulte Waregem and Club Brugge, who were the reigning champions. However, a summer bout with malaria had affected his physical condition, and neither club decided to take him on loan. On 22 August 2018, Osimhen joined Belgian club Charleroi on a season-long loan deal, having failed to score in any of his 16 appearances with Wolfsburg. He replaced the departed Kaveh Rezaei, who was sold to Club Brugge after scoring 3 goals in the first three games of the season. Osimhen made his debut on 1 September against Excel Mouscron, entering as a late substitute for Jérémy Perbet. Osimhen made his full debut on 22 September, scoring his first goal as a professional with a backheel against Waasland-Beveren. Waasland-Beveren would equalise against 10-man Charleroi, and Perbet would later get sent off in the game as well, aiding manager Felice Mazzu's selection up top. Osimhen would start with Adama Niane for the next four games, scoring the club's only goal in losses to Cercle Brugge and Gent. He also scored twice in the last five minutes in a 3–2 win over Zulte Waregem on 21 October, after Hamdi Harbaoui had given Waregem a 2–1 lead with a second-half brace. Osimhen was not dropped from the side until 25 November, when he scored a goal off the bench in the club's 4–2 win over Lokeren. After the game, Osimhen told BBC Sport that he had "found his happiness again". Osimhen finished the first half with 8 goals in 16 games, second only to Cristian Benavente in the team.

After a successful spell with the Belgian side, playing 36 games and scoring 20 goals, Charleroi activated their option to acquire Osimhen following his satisfactory performances while on loan.

=== Lille ===
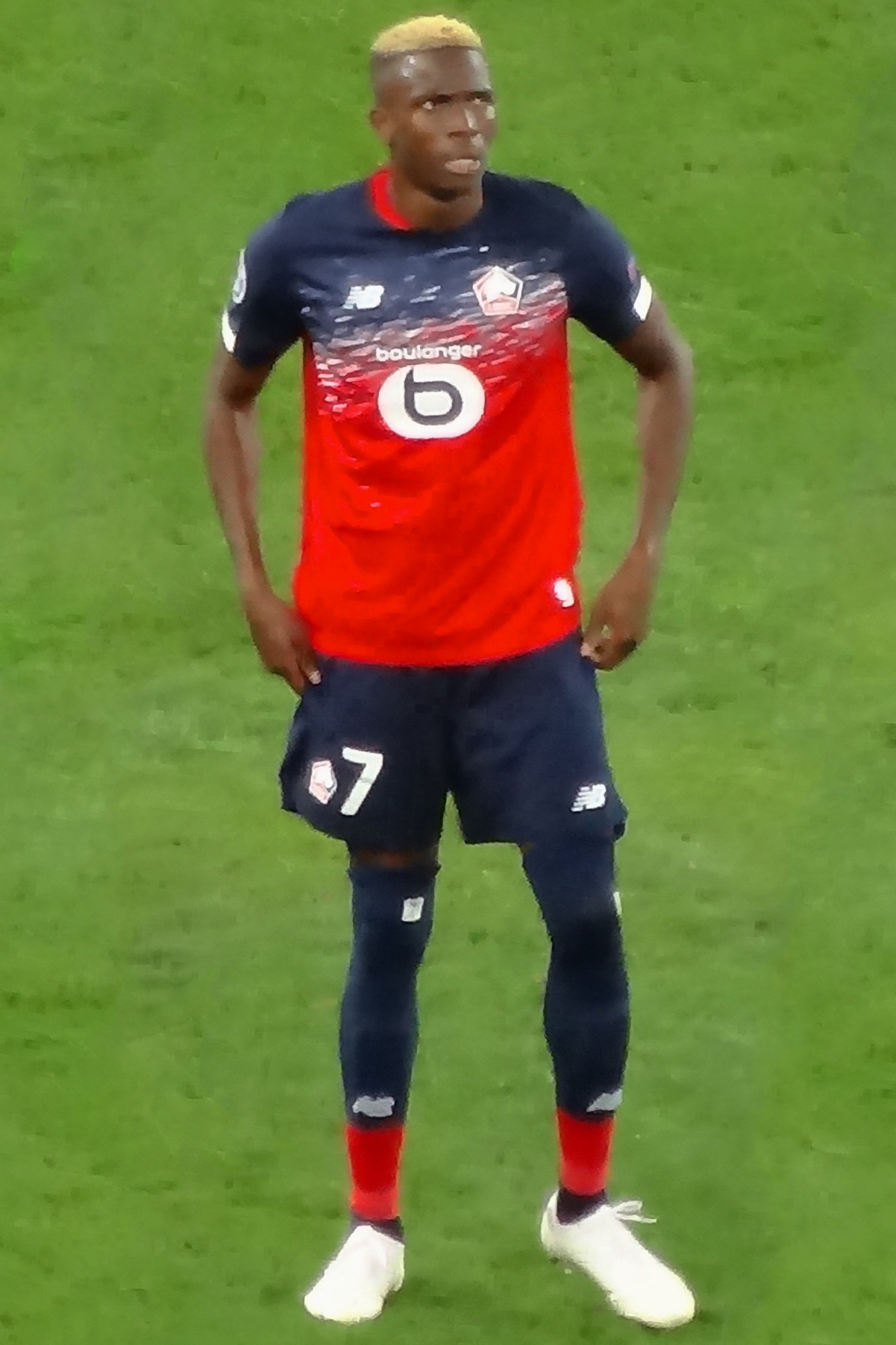
Osimhen playing for Lille in 2019

Despite being a reported target of several European clubs, French Ligue 1 club Lille confirmed the transfer of Osimhen on 1 August 2019, signing a five-year contract. The transfer fee was reported to be priced at €12 million plus another €3 million in various bonuses and add-ons. Upon his arrival, he told the club's official website: "Lille is a very good club which has a quality project and high-class players, and especially these last years. Great Nigerian players (Peter Odemwingie and Vincent Enyeama) have also played here." Osimhen was given the number 7, which was previously worn by Rafael Leão.

Ten days after the move, he made his Ligue 1 debut for the club on 11 August, scoring a brace in a 2–1 win against Nantes. Two weeks later, he scored another brace in a 3–0 home win against Saint-Étienne for his third game in France, his performance earning him a rating of 8/10 in French sports newspaper L'Équipe.

Osimhen was named the Ligue 1 Player of the Month for September 2019, having scored two goals and assisted two more in Lille's five league matches. He then scored his first goal in the UEFA Champions League on 2 October 2019, coming in a 1–2 home defeat to English side Chelsea. In March, a report published by the league showed that Osimhen was the player who has most broken the 35 km/h (21.75 mph) barrier with seven sprints above this speed, ahead of Kylian Mbappé. The Nigerian finished the season as Lille's top scorer, with 13 goals in 25 domestic championship matches, and 18 goals across all competitions.

His good season and strong goalscoring performances earned him the 2020 Prix Marc-Vivien Foé, a prize awarded to the best African player in the French championship, and saw Osimhen tipped by many to be in running for the African Footballer of the Year award in the near future. On 2 June 2020, he was awarded Lille's Player of the Season, having secured the highest number of votes from fans.

=== Napoli ===
==== 2020–22: First seasons adjustments ====
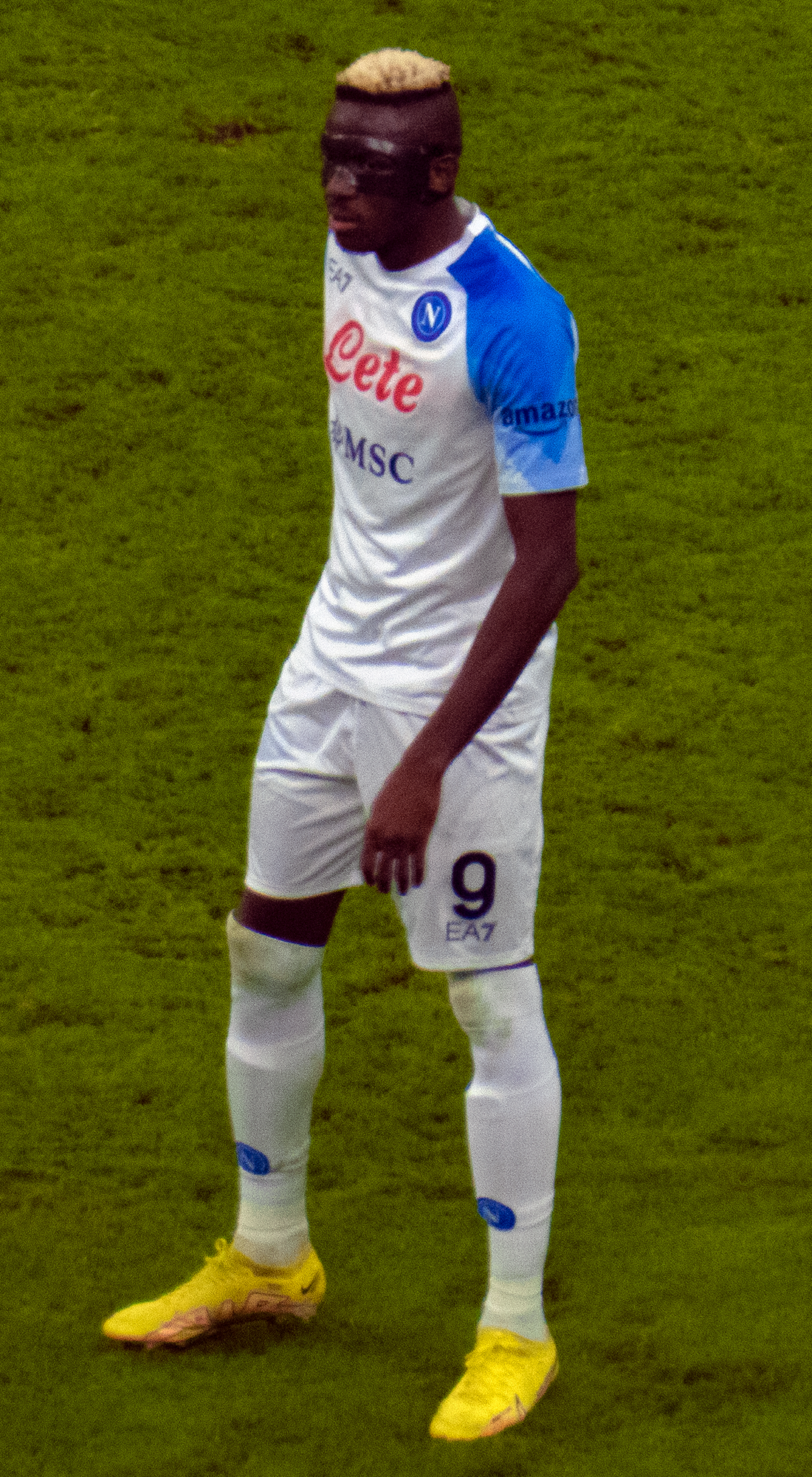
Osimhen playing for Napoli in 2023

On 31 July 2020, Serie A club Napoli announced the signing of Osimhen, for a club-record fee of €70 million potentially rising to €80 million with add-ons, making him the second most expensive African transfer to date. On 17 October, Osimhen scored his first goal for Napoli in a 4–1 win against Atalanta. Upon scoring, he held up a shirt calling for the ending of the ongoing police brutality in his home country of Nigeria.

On 13 November, during an Africa Cup of Nations qualifying game played whilst on international break with Nigeria, Osimhen was stretchered off injured. This was then diagnosed as a shoulder injury that would keep Osimhen away from the playing field for two months. While recovering from the injury, Osimhen was authorised by his club to spend time in his home country, where he got a chance to celebrate his birthday. It was during these birthday celebrations that it is believed Osimhen contracted the COVID-19 virus, as he tested positive upon returning to Naples. This positive test, together with his shoulder injury, kept Osimhen away from action until his return to the side on 29 January 2021, when he was subbed on for around twenty minutes of Napoli's Coppa Italia win against Spezia.

On 16 September 2021, Osimhen scored a brace in a 2–2 away draw against Leicester City in the Europa League group stage. In November 2021, Osimhen suffered a horrific head injury and a fractured skull and eye socket in Napoli's 3–2 loss to Inter Milan at San Siro. He underwent immediate surgery and was forced to miss the Africa Cup of Nations in Cameroon. He has been wearing a protective mask since due to risks posed by playing without it and he stated in an interview that he would play in it for the rest of his career, and by the end of the season, he scored 14 goals in Serie A and 18 in all competitions.

==== 2022–23: Breakthrough, Capocannoniere and Serie A title ====
On 12 October 2022, Osimhen scored his first Champions League goal with Napoli in a 4–2 win over Ajax, which secured their qualification to the knockout phase. On 29 October, he scored his first Serie A hat-trick in a 4–0 win over Sassuolo. On 11 November, he scored a goal and assisted another to help Napoli win 2–1 at Atalanta, becoming Nigeria's highest goal scorer in the Italian Serie A with 32 goals, and surpassing Simy's record of 31.

On 13 January 2023, Osimhen scored two and assisted another as Napoli beat Juventus 5–1. On 17 February 2023, he scored his 100th career goal to help Napoli win 2–0 at Sassuolo. He also became the first ever player in the history of Napoli in the three-point era to score in seven league games in a row. In the Champions League round of 16, Osimhen scored three goals over two legs for Napoli against Eintracht Frankfurt, which ended in a 5–0 win on aggregate and a first-time qualification to the quarter-finals.

On 4 May, he scored the equaliser in a 1–1 draw with Udinese, confirming Napoli as Serie A champions for the first time in 33 years. His goal made him the joint-highest goalscoring African in the Serie A alongside George Weah and the African player with the most goals in a single Italian championship season, breaking Samuel Eto'o's record in the process. Three days later, he scored the winning goal from a penalty in a 1–0 victory over Fiorentina, to become the highest scoring African player in Serie A with 47 goals, overtaking Weah's record. He finished the season as top scorer with 26 goals, to be the first African to achieve this feat.

==== 2023–24: Contract renewal ====
On 19 August, Osimhen opened the regular season with Napoli by scoring a brace against newly promoted Frosinone in a 3–1 victory. In September 2023, Napoli's official TikTok account posted a video of Osimhen featuring the lyrics "I'm not a boy, I'm not a girl, I'm a coconut," leading his agent to threaten legal action. A hamstring injury during Nigeria's 2–2 friendly draw to Saudi Arabia on 16 October 2023 caused him to miss four regular season games and two Champions League group stage matches. He returned on 25 November 2023 and assisted Eljif Elmas' winning goal in a 2–1 victory over Atalanta. Osimhen scored his first goal of the 2023–24 Champions League campaign in the final group stage match in a 2–0 victory over Braga on 12 December 2023, securing Napoli's progression to the knockout stages over the Portuguese side.

On 23 December, Osimhen extended his contract with Napoli until 2026, with a new release clause set at €130 million. Later the same day, Osimhen was sent off with a second yellow card against Roma with the score at 1–0 in Roma's favor, and Napoli would go on to lose 2–0 following a goal by Romelu Lukaku. This meant that he would not be able to play in the last game of the season before his international call-up for the 2023 Africa Cup of Nations. On 28 February 2024, he scored a hat-trick in a 6–1 away win over Sassuolo, thus becoming the third player to score at least ten goals in Serie A in four consecutive seasons at Napoli, following Diego Maradona and Attila Sallustro.

=== Galatasaray ===
==== 2024–25: Season on loan and league's top scorer ====
Over the course of the summer transfer window, there was much speculation that Osimhen would leave Napoli with Al-Ahli, Chelsea, and Paris Saint-Germain all heavily linked with the player. On 30 August 2024, it was reported that Osimhen had agreed a deal with Saudi Pro League side Al-Ahli but the deal fell through after Napoli changed their asking price for his permanent transfer away. Instead, Al-Ahli signed Brentford striker Ivan Toney. The same day, a proposed move to Chelsea also fell through as the player was not able to agree to a deal with the Premier League side. On 31 August, Osimhen was excluded from Napoli's Serie A squad for the season and stripped of his number, with the shirt being handed to new signing Romelu Lukaku instead.

On 3 September, Turkish Süper Lig club Galatasaray opened talks to take Osimhen on loan until the end of the 2024–25 season. The next day, Galatasaray announced the completion of their loan signing of Osimhen. On 28 September, Osimhen scored his first goals for the club when he netted a brace in the first half of a 3–3 draw with Kasımpaşa. At the end of the first half, Osimhen suffered an injury and was replaced by former Napoli teammate Dries Mertens. Osimhen scored his first goals in Europe for Galatasaray following his transfer from Napoli, scoring a first half brace within eight minutes as they beat Tottenham Hotspur 3–2 in the league phase of the Europa League.

On 14 March 2025, Osimhen scored his first hat-trick with Galatasaray in a 4–0 victory over Antalyaspor. On 14 May, Osimhen scored a brace, in a player of the match performance, helping his club beat Trabzonspor 3–0 in the Turkish Cup final. With his two goals in the final, Osimhen reached 35 goals in 39 official matches, setting a new record for most goals scored in a single season by a foreign player in Turkey. He surpassed former Galatasaray striker Mario Jardel’s long-standing record of 34 goals. On 18 May, Osimhen scored the opening goal in a 3–0 win against Kayserispor as Galatasaray won the Süper Lig title. With 26 goals scored, he finished the season as the league top scorer, helping the club securing the domestic double. On 17 June, Osimhen's bicycle kick goal in Galatasaray's 3–0 win against Antalyaspor was voted the Süper Lig goal of the season. He came off the bench in the 78th minute to score the goal in the 94th minute, after having a goal disallowed in the 80th minute of the match.

==== 2025–26: Record transfer and back-to-back league titles ====
In the statement made by the Galatasaray team on 30 July, it was learned that Osimhen, with whom an agreement was reached, would come to Istanbul to sign an official contract. He signed a four year contract with Galatasaray on July 31, with a net transfer fee of €75 million to be paid to his former club Napoli. This made Osimhen the player with the highest transfer fee in Turkish football history.

On 5 November, Osimhen became the first foreigner, and the second overall Galatasaray player (after Burak Yılmaz) to score a hat-trick in the Champions League after netting three goals against Ajax in a 3–0 away victory, allowing him to overtake Obafemi Martins as Nigeria's all-time top scorer in European competitions and also making him the second Nigerian player (after Yakubu) to have scored a hat-trick in the Champions League.

On 24 January 2026, Osimhen became the fastest player in Galatasaray history to reach 50 goals, achieving the milestone in just 59 appearances after scoring in a league match against Fatih Karagümrük in the 55th minute, further cementing his status as one of the most prolific forwards ever to wear the club's colours. On 18 March, during the second leg of Champions League round of 16 tie against Liverpool, he was subbed off the pitch due to an injury which he sustained in the early minutes of the match. He returned from injury to the starting lineup for Galatasaray on 26 April against Fenerbahçe. He ended the game playing the full 90 minutes, scoring the first goal in a 3–0 win against their intercontinental rivals. A few weeks later, on 9 May, he netted a brace in a 4–2 win over Antalyaspor, securing his club's 26th Süper Lig title.

== International career ==
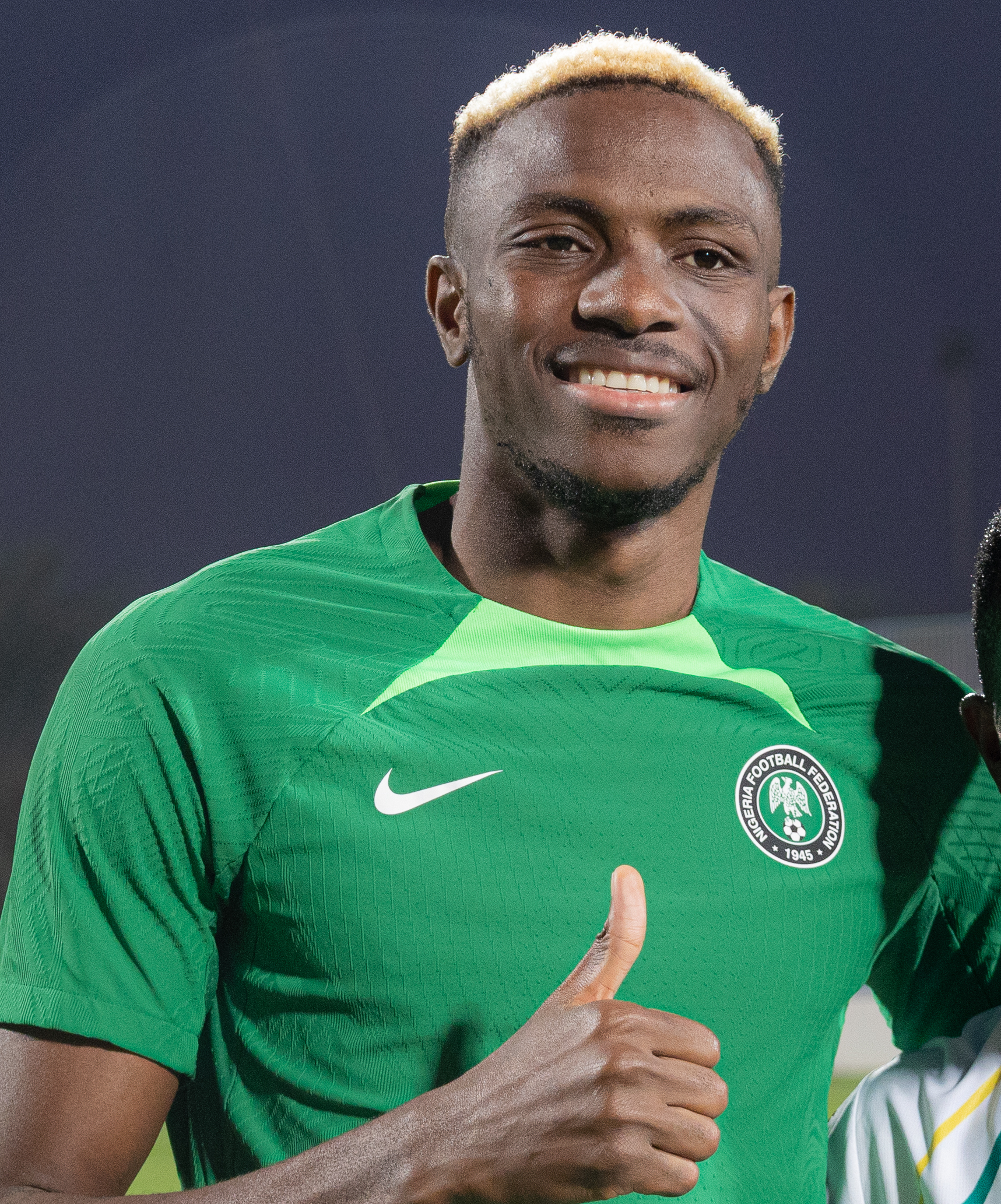
Osimhen with Nigeria in 2024

Osimhen was a member of the Nigeria under-17 team that won the 2015 FIFA U-17 World Cup in Chile. He scored 10 goals in seven games at the tournament and won the Golden Boot and Silver Ball awards. His performances also earned him the CAF Youth Player of the Year award in 2015.

Osimhen made his official senior debut for Nigeria in a 2–0 defeat against South Africa on 10 June 2017. He missed out on Nigeria's 2018 FIFA World Cup campaign after his inconsistent season at Wolfsburg. Following a successful start to his loan spell at Charleroi, he was recalled by Gernot Rohr for the November 2018 international break, starting their friendly win over Uganda.

In March 2019, Osimhen was released from the Super Eagles squad to represent the Nigerian U23 side as they were two goals down against their Libyan opponent. He scored three goals in the return match against Libya in Asaba.

Osimhen was listed in coach Gernot Rohr's 25-man provisional list for the 2019 Africa Cup of Nations tournament in Egypt and was further listed in the final list for the tournament. In the match for third place, he replaced the injured Odion Ighalo at half-time in the team's 1–0 victory over Tunisia. He played a total of 45 mins at the tournament.

The Super Eagles ended the 2021 AFCON qualifiers on a high, beating Lesotho 3–0. However, Osimhen missed the 2021 Africa Cup of Nations supposedly due to COVID-19 as claimed by his club. This claim provoked a response from a sport lawyer in Nigeria who wrote to express his dismay to the alleged intention of Osimhen's club side, Napoli, to deprive Nigeria the services of their star striker. The Napoli owner, Aurelio De Laurentiis, angered many Africans, when he said he would no longer sign African players unless they agreed to sign a waiver to not participate in the AFCON.

Osimhen started the qualification for the 2023 AFCON qualifiers in sparkling form helping Nigeria win both of their first two matches. Osimhen netted a goal against Sierra Leone and another four goals in a 10–0 win against São Tomé and Príncipe. Osimhen's super hat-trick, was his first senior international hat-trick for the Super Eagles. In the reverse fixture played at the Godswill Akpabio International Stadium, Uyo on 10 September 2023, Osimhen scored his second international hat-trick in Nigeria's 6–0 win against São Tomé and Principe, finishing the 2023 AFCON qualifiers as top scorer with 10 goals.

In December 2023, he was called up for the 2023 Africa Cup of Nations in Ivory Coast. He netted a goal in the opening match against Equatorial Guinea which ended in a 1–1 draw. In March 2025, he became the second highest goal scorer for the Nigeria national team after scoring two goals in a 2–0 away victory over Rwanda during the 2026 FIFA World Cup qualification.

On 14 October 2025, Osimhen scored a hat-trick against Benin in Nigeria’s 4–0 victory, which sealed the Super Eagles’ place in the FIFA World Cup qualifiers playoffs. In Nigeria's semi-finals tie against Gabon on 13 November, the game went to extra time, during which Osimhen scored a brace and Chidera Ejuke scored a goal to advance to the finals against the Democratic Republic of the Congo. However, in the final played on 16 November, Osimhen was forced to come off during half-time due to an injury, and the game would ultimately end in a penalty shoot-out loss after the game ended 1–1.

On 11 December 2025, Osimhen was called up to the Nigeria squad for the 2025 Africa Cup of Nations. He scored four goals during the tournament as Nigeria finished third, securing the bronze medal.

== Player profile ==
=== Style of play ===
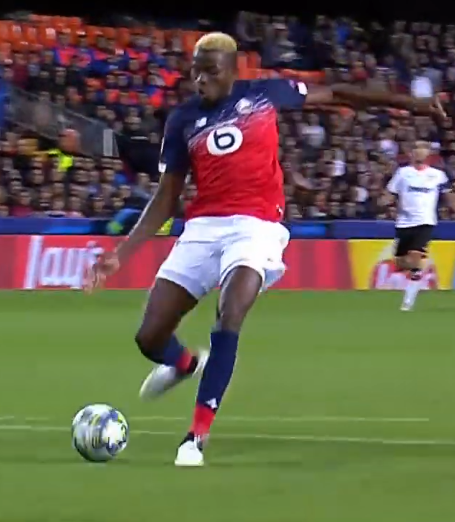
Osimhen scoring a goal for Lille in 2019

Osimhen is a right-footed centre-forward known for his physical presence, athleticism, strength, directness, runs into space, eye for goal and linkup play. Osimhen's strongest attributes are his explosive pace and strong aerial ability. Standing at 185 cm tall, Osimhen's wide frame and ability to hold up the ball make him an effective target man, capable of bringing others into play and contributing to the build-up of attacking moves. He is also known for his close control inside the box. Often he has been criticized for his lack of dribbling bravado, but his combination of both positional and link up play more than make up for it, thereby giving him better movement off the ball. Consequently, this adds efficiency to his game. His composure in front of goal and ability to convert chances from various positions make him a valuable asset for his teams. Osimhen's stamina, work rate and willingness to press opponents make him an active contributor to his team's defensive efforts.

=== Reception ===
Following Osimhen's performances for club and country, Nigeria’s head coach Eric Chelle described him as “the best striker in the world” after a 2025 World Cup qualifier. He was also named the 46th best footballer globally in The Guardian's 2025 rankings, and Goal.com have described him as "one of world football's best No.9s".

Osimhen's style of play has been compared to fellow strikers Kylian Mbappe and Erling Haaland. Opta Analyst wrote: "Among that early-prime age group, Victor Osimhen was arguably near the top". His manager at Napoli, Luciano Spalletti, described him as "such a great striker" and "the complete package". In December 2022, Francesco Totti called him "the best striker in Serie A". In January 2023, Romelu Lukaku described him as "the best striker". Fellow Nigerian forward Odion Ighalo hailed him as "the future of Nigerian football". After Osimhen scored in Napoli's 2–1 win over Roma in January 2023, former Brazil and Napoli striker Careca said: "In that goal, I saw something similar to Pelé".

Osimhen has named Didier Drogba as an influence and idol of his.

== Media and sponsorship ==
Osimhen’s profile on and off the pitch has made him a highly marketable figure, attracting endorsement and commercial partnerships with several major brands. In September 2025, Nigerian fintech company Moniepoint announced Osimhen as a brand ambassador as part of its “Made for Your Progress” campaign, aiming to inspire young Nigerians and expand its sports‑driven initiatives.

He has also entered into commercial agreements that leverage his image rights; after his record transfer to Galatasaray, Osimhen secured control over aspects of his image rights, a development highlighted by SportBusiness+Brand Magazine as confirming his growing value in the commercial space.

Osimhen’s marketability extends to multiple product endorsements, including roles with Moniepoint and Reckitt Nigeria, for products such as Dettol, as well as reported partnerships with global sportswear brands.

In April 2025, Osimhen appeared in a television commercial for Ülker Çizi, a popular Turkish snack brand produced by Ülker. The advertisement marked his first major endorsement following his loan move to Galatasaray. The campaign, which highlighted his impact in the Turkish Süper Lig, received significant attention on social media. While the collaboration featured Osimhen prominently, it was not officially confirmed as a long-term brand ambassadorship.

Osimhen was sponsored by Nike, before joining Adidas in 2024.

== Personal life ==
Victor Osimhen was born to a father from Esan in Edo State and a mother from Ukwuani in Delta State. He had a tough childhood and at some point sold sachet water and newspapers in traffic to support his family after the death of his beloved mother, Christiana. He has openly spoken about his humble beginnings and how those experiences shaped his resilience and determination.

Osimhen has publicly acknowledged being in a relationship with Stefanie Kim Ladewig a German-born model and together they have a daughter. Osimhen is a Christian. He has stated that he has drawn inspiration from Sadio Mané, who helps his community in Senegal, and has said he wants to help disabled people throughout Africa. Osimhen announced the birth of his first child, a daughter named Haly, born in October 2022.

== Career statistics ==
=== Club ===
As of match played 30 October 2026

Appearances and goals by club, season and competition
| Club | Season | League | | | National cup (Note: Includes DFB-Pokal, Belgian Cup, Coupe de France, Coppa Italia, Turkish Cup) | | League cup (Note: Includes Coupe de la Ligue) | | Europe | | Other | | Total | |
| Club | Season | Division | Apps | Goals | Apps | Goals | Apps | Goals | Apps | Goals | Apps | Goals | Apps | Goals |
|---|---|---|---|---|---|---|---|---|---|---|---|---|---|---|
| VfL Wolfsburg | 2016–17 | Bundesliga | 2 | 0 | 0 | 0 | — | | — | | 1 (Note: Appearance in Bundesliga relegation play-offs) | 0 | 3 | 0 |
| VfL Wolfsburg | 2017–18 | Bundesliga | 12 | 0 | 1 | 0 | — | | — | | — | | 13 | 0 |
| VfL Wolfsburg | Total | | 14 | 0 | 1 | 0 | — | | — | | 1 | 0 | 16 | 0 |
| Charleroi (loan) | 2018–19 | Belgian Pro League | 25 | 12 | 2 | 1 | — | | — | | 9 (Note: Appearances in Belgian Pro League European play-offs) | 7 | 36 | 20 |
| Lille | 2019–20 | Ligue 1 | 27 | 13 | 3 | 1 | 3 | 2 | 5 (Note: Appearances in UEFA Champions League) | 2 | — | | 38 | 18 |
| Napoli | 2020–21 | Serie A | 24 | 10 | 3 | 0 | — | | 3 (Note: Appearances in UEFA Europa League) | 0 | 0 | 0 | 30 | 10 |
| Napoli | 2021–22 | Serie A | 27 | 14 | 0 | 0 | — | | 5 | 4 | — | | 32 | 18 |
| Napoli | 2022–23 | Serie A | 32 | 26 | 1 | 0 | — | | 6 | 5 | — | | 39 | 31 |
| Napoli | 2023–24 | Serie A | 25 | 15 | 1 | 0 | — | | 6 | 2 | 0 | 0 | 32 | 17 |
| Napoli | Total | | 108 | 65 | 5 | 0 | — | | 20 | 11 | 0 | 0 | 133 | 76 |
| Galatasaray (loan) | 2024–25 | Süper Lig | 30 | 26 | 4 | 5 | — | | 7 | 6 | — | | 41 | 37 |
| Galatasaray | 2025–26 | Süper Lig | 22 | 15 | 1 | 0 | — | | 10 | 7 | 0 | 0 | 33 | 22 |
| Galatasaray | 2026–27 | Süper Lig | 8 | 9 | 0 | 0 | — | | 2 | 1 | 0 | 0 | 10 | 10 |
| Galatasaray | Galatasaray total | | 60 | 50 | 5 | 5 | — | | 19 | 14 | 0 | 0 | 84 | 69 |
| Career total | | | 234 | 140 | 16 | 7 | 3 | 2 | 44 | 27 | 10 | 7 | 307 | 183 |

=== International ===
As of match played 14 January 2026

Appearances and goals by national team and year
| National team | Year | Apps | Goals |
|---|---|---|---|
| Nigeria | 2017 | 1 (Note: Osimhen also appeared in one match against Togo in 2017, however Nigeria made nine substitutions during this match, and therefore it is not recognised as an official match by FIFA.) | 0 |
| Nigeria | 2018 | 1 | 0 |
| Nigeria | 2019 | 7 | 4 |
| Nigeria | 2020 | 1 | 1 |
| Nigeria | 2021 | 8 | 5 |
| Nigeria | 2022 | 4 | 5 |
| Nigeria | 2023 | 5 | 5 |
| Nigeria | 2024 | 11 | 3 |
| Nigeria | 2025 | 10 | 9 |
| Nigeria | 2026 | 3 | 3 |
| Total | | 51 | 35 |

Scores and results list Nigeria's goal tally first, score column indicates score after each Osimhen goal.

List of international goals scored by Victor Osimhen
| No. | Date | Venue | Opponent | Score | Result | Competition | Ref. |
|---|---|---|---|---|---|---|---|
| 1 | 10 September 2019 | Dnipro-Arena, Dnipro, Ukraine | Ukraine | 2–0 | 2–2 | Friendly | |
| 2 | 13 November 2019 | Godswill Akpabio International Stadium, Uyo, Nigeria | Benin | 1–1 | 2–1 | 2021 Africa Cup of Nations qualification | |
| 3 | 17 November 2019 | Setsoto Stadium, Maseru, Lesotho | Lesotho | 3–1 | 4–2 | 2021 Africa Cup of Nations qualification | |
| 4 | 17 November 2019 | Setsoto Stadium, Maseru, Lesotho | Lesotho | 4–1 | 4–2 | 2021 Africa Cup of Nations qualification | |
| 5 | 13 November 2020 | Samuel Ogbemudia Stadium, Benin City, Nigeria | Sierra Leone | 2–0 | 4–4 | 2021 Africa Cup of Nations qualification | |
| 6 | 30 March 2021 | Teslim Balogun Stadium, Surulere, Nigeria | Lesotho | 1–0 | 3–0 | 2021 Africa Cup of Nations qualification | |
| 7 | 7 September 2021 | Estádio Municipal Adérito Sena, Mindelo, Cape Verde | Cape Verde | 1–1 | 2–1 | 2022 FIFA World Cup qualification | |
| 8 | 10 October 2021 | Japoma Stadium, Douala, Cameroon | Central African Republic | 2–0 | 2–0 | 2022 FIFA World Cup qualification | |
| 9 | 13 November 2021 | Ibn Batouta Stadium, Tangier, Morocco | Liberia | 1–0 | 2–0 | 2022 FIFA World Cup qualification | |
| 10 | 16 November 2021 | Teslim Balogun Stadium, Surulere, Nigeria | Cape Verde | 1–0 | 1–1 | 2022 FIFA World Cup qualification | |
| 11 | 9 June 2022 | Moshood Abiola National Stadium, Abuja, Nigeria | Sierra Leone | 2–1 | 2–1 | 2023 Africa Cup of Nations qualification | |
| 12 | 13 June 2022 | Adrar Stadium, Agadir, Morocco | São Tomé and Príncipe | 1–0 | 10–0 | 2023 Africa Cup of Nations qualification | |
| 13 | 13 June 2022 | Adrar Stadium, Agadir, Morocco | São Tomé and Príncipe | 4–0 | 10–0 | 2023 Africa Cup of Nations qualification | |
| 14 | 13 June 2022 | Adrar Stadium, Agadir, Morocco | São Tomé and Príncipe | 8–0 | 10–0 | 2023 Africa Cup of Nations qualification | |
| 15 | 13 June 2022 | Adrar Stadium, Agadir, Morocco | São Tomé and Príncipe | 9–0 | 10–0 | 2023 Africa Cup of Nations qualification | |
| 16 | 18 June 2023 | Samuel Kanyon Doe Sports Complex, Paynesville, Liberia | Sierra Leone | 1–0 | 3–2 | 2023 Africa Cup of Nations qualification | |
| 17 | 18 June 2023 | Samuel Kanyon Doe Sports Complex, Paynesville, Liberia | Sierra Leone | 2–0 | 3–2 | 2023 Africa Cup of Nations qualification | |
| 18 | 10 September 2023 | Godswill Akpabio International Stadium, Uyo, Nigeria | São Tomé and Príncipe | 1–0 | 6–0 | 2023 Africa Cup of Nations qualification | |
| 19 | 10 September 2023 | Godswill Akpabio International Stadium, Uyo, Nigeria | São Tomé and Príncipe | 4–0 | 6–0 | 2023 Africa Cup of Nations qualification | |
| 20 | 10 September 2023 | Godswill Akpabio International Stadium, Uyo, Nigeria | São Tomé and Príncipe | 5–0 | 6–0 | 2023 Africa Cup of Nations qualification | |
| 21 | 14 January 2024 | Alassane Ouattara Stadium, Abidjan, Ivory Coast | Equatorial Guinea | 1–1 | 1–1 | 2023 Africa Cup of Nations | |
| 22 | 7 September 2024 | Godswill Akpabio International Stadium, Uyo, Nigeria | Benin | 2–0 | 3–0 | 2025 Africa Cup of Nations qualification | |
| 23 | 14 November 2024 | Felix Houphouet Boigny Stadium, Abidjan, Ivory Coast | Benin | 1–1 | 1–1 | 2025 Africa Cup of Nations qualification | |
| 24 | 21 March 2025 | Amahoro Stadium, Kigali, Rwanda | Rwanda | 1–0 | 2–0 | 2026 FIFA World Cup qualification | |
| 25 | 21 March 2025 | Amahoro Stadium, Kigali, Rwanda | Rwanda | 2–0 | 2–0 | 2026 FIFA World Cup qualification | |
| 26 | 25 March 2025 | Godswill Akpabio International Stadium, Uyo, Nigeria | Zimbabwe | 1–0 | 1–1 | 2026 FIFA World Cup qualification | |
| 27 | 14 October 2025 | Godswill Akpabio International Stadium, Uyo, Nigeria | Benin | 1–0 | 4–0 | 2026 FIFA World Cup qualification | |
| 28 | 14 October 2025 | Godswill Akpabio International Stadium, Uyo, Nigeria | Benin | 2–0 | 4–0 | 2026 FIFA World Cup qualification | |
| 29 | 14 October 2025 | Godswill Akpabio International Stadium, Uyo, Nigeria | Benin | 3–0 | 4–0 | 2026 FIFA World Cup qualification | |
| 30 | 13 November 2025 | Moulay Hassan Stadium, Rabat, Morocco | Gabon | 3–1 | 4–1 (a.e.t.) | 2026 FIFA World Cup qualification | |
| 31 | 13 November 2025 | Moulay Hassan Stadium, Rabat, Morocco | Gabon | 4–1 | 4–1 (a.e.t.) | 2026 FIFA World Cup qualification | |
| 32 | 27 December 2025 | Fez Stadium, Fez, Morocco | Tunisia | 1–0 | 3–2 | 2025 Africa Cup of Nations | |
| 33 | 5 January 2026 | Fez Stadium, Fez, Morocco | Mozambique | 2–0 | 4–0 | 2025 Africa Cup of Nations | |
| 34 | 5 January 2026 | Fez Stadium, Fez, Morocco | Mozambique | 3–0 | 4–0 | 2025 Africa Cup of Nations | |
| 35 | 10 January 2026 | Marrakesh Stadium, Marrakesh, Morocco | Algeria | 1–0 | 2–0 | 2025 Africa Cup of Nations | |

== Honours ==
Napoli

- Serie A: 2022–23

Galatasaray

- Süper Lig: 2024–25, 2025–26
- Turkish Cup: 2024–25

Nigeria U17

- FIFA U-17 World Cup: 2015

Nigeria U23

- U-23 Africa Cup of Nations: 2015

Nigeria

- Africa Cup of Nations runner-up: 2023; third place: 2019, 2025

Individual

- U-17 Africa Cup of Nations Golden Boot: 2015
- FIFA U-17 World Cup Golden Boot: 2015
- FIFA U-17 World Cup Silver Ball: 2015
- CAF Youth Player of the Year: 2015
- UNFP Ligue 1 Player of the Month: September 2019
- Prix Marc-Vivien Foé: 2020
- ESM Team of the Season: 2022–23
- Serie A Best Under-23: 2021–22
- Serie A Best Striker: 2022–23
- Serie A Player of the Month: March 2022, January 2023
- Serie A Goal of the Month: January 2023
- Globe Soccer Awards Emerging Player of the Year: 2022
- Stampa Estera Italia Best Foreign Athlete of the Year: 2022
- Nigeria Pitch Awards King of the Pitch: 2022
- Ghana Football Awards Best African International: 2023
- Lille Player of the Season: 2019–20
- Africa Cup of Nations qualifiers top scorer: 2021, 2023
- CAF Team of the Year: 2023, 2024
- Africa Cup of Nations Team of the Tournament: 2025
- Capocannoniere: 2022–23
- African Footballer of the Year: 2023
- Serie A Footballer of the Year: 2023
- Serie A Team of the Year: 2022–23
- Süper Lig Top Goalscorer: 2024–25
- Süper Lig Goal of the Season: 2024–25
- Süper Lig Team of the Season: 2024–25
- Turkish Footballer of the Year: 2025

Orders

- Member of the Order of the Federal Republic
- Member of the Order of the Niger
