= 2019–20 Lille OSC season =

Lille
2019–20 season
- President: Gérard Lopez
- Head coach: Christophe Galtier
- Stadium: Stade Pierre-Mauroy
- Ligue 1: 4th
- Coupe de France: Round of 16
- Coupe de la Ligue: Semi-finals
- UEFA Champions League: Group stage
- Top goalscorer: League: Victor Osimhen (13); All: Victor Osimhen (18)
Home colours	Away colours	Third colours

The 2019–20 season was Lille OSC's 76th season in existence and the club's 20th consecutive season in the top flight of French football. In addition to the domestic league, Lille participated in this season's edition of the Coupe de France, the Coupe de la Ligue, and the UEFA Champions League. The season covered the period from 1 July 2019 to 30 June 2020.

The club made their first appearance in the UEFA Champions League since 2012.

== Players ==
=== Squad information ===
Players and squad numbers last updated on 13 August 2019. Appearances include league matches only.
Note: Flags indicate national team as has been defined under FIFA eligibility rules. Players may hold more than one non-FIFA nationality.

No.	Name	Nat	Position(s)	Date of birth (age)	Signed in	Contract ends	Signed from	Apps.	Goals
Goalkeepers
1	Léo Jardim	(Brazil)	GK	20 March 1995 (age 31)	2019	2024	(Portugal) Rio Ave	0	0
16	Mike Maignan	(France)	GK	3 July 1995 (age 31)	2015	2022	(France) Paris Saint-Germain	83	0
40	Adam Jakubech	(Slovakia)	GK	2 January 1997 (age 29)	2017	2022	(Slovakia) Spartak Trnava	0	0
Defenders
2	Tiago Djaló	(Portugal)	CB	9 April 2000 (age 26)	2019	2024	(Italy) Milan	0	0
3	Saad Agouzoul	(Morocco)	CB	10 August 1997 (age 29)	2019	2024	(Morocco) Kawkab Marrakech	0	0
4	Gabriel	(Brazil)	CB	19 December 1997 (age 28)	2017	2021	(Brazil) Avaí	15	1
5	Adama Soumaoro	(France)	CB	18 June 1992 (age 34)	2011	2021	(France) Youth Sector	94	1
6	José Fonte	(Portugal)	CB	22 December 1983 (age 42)	2018	2020	(China) Dalian Yifang	36	3
17	Zeki Çelik	(Turkey)	RB	17 February 1997 (age 29)	2018	2023	(Turkey) İstanbulspor	34	1
26	Jérémy Pied	(France)	RB	23 February 1989 (age 37)	2018	2020	(England) Southampton	11	0
28	Reinildo Mandava	(Mozambique)	LB	21 January 1994 (age 32)	2019	2022	(Portugal) Belenenses	3	0
29	Domagoj Bradarić	(Croatia)	LB	10 December 1999 (age 26)	2019	2024	(Croatia) Hajduk Split	0	0
Midfielders
8	Xeka	(Portugal)	DM / CM	10 November 1994 (age 32)	2017	2022	(Portugal) Braga	41	3
12	Yusuf Yazıcı	(Turkey)	AM	29 January 1997 (age 29)	2019	2024	(Turkey) Trabzonspor	0	0
18	Renato Sanches	(Portugal)	DM / CM	18 August 1997 (age 29)	2019	2023	(Germany) Bayern Munich	0	0
20	Nicolás Gaitán	(Argentina)	AM / LW / RW	23 February 1988 (age 38)	2020	2020	(United States) Chicago Fire	0	0
21	Arton Zekaj	(Kosovo)	DM	16 April 2000 (age 26)	2018	2021	(Serbia) Sopot	1	0
24	Boubakary Soumaré	(France)	DM / CM	27 February 1999 (age 27)	2017	2020	(France) Paris Saint-Germain	32	1
27	Benjamin André	(France)	CM	3 August 1990 (age 36)	2019	2023	(France) Rennes	0	0
Forwards
7	Victor Osimhen	(Nigeria)	CF	29 December 1998 (age 27)	2019	2024	(Belgium) Charleroi	3	4
9	Loïc Rémy	(France)	CF	2 January 1987 (age 39)	2018	2020	(Spain) Las Palmas	26	7
10	Jonathan Ikoné	(France)	LW / AM	2 May 1999 (age 27)	2018	2023	(France) Paris Saint-Germain	38	3
11	Luiz Araújo	(Brazil)	LW	2 June 1996 (age 30)	2017	2022	(Brazil) São Paulo	59	8
14	Jonathan Bamba	(France)	LW	26 March 1996 (age 30)	2018	2023	(France) Saint-Étienne	38	13
22	Timothy Weah	(United States)	CF	22 February 2000 (age 26)	2019	2024	(France) Paris Saint-Germain	0	0
Players transferred out during the season
20	Thiago Maia	(Brazil)	DM	23 March 1997 (age 29)	2017	2022	(Brazil) Santos	59	0

== Transfers ==
=== In ===
Date	Pos.	Player	Age	Moving from	Fee	Notes	Source
1 July 2019	FW	Timothy Weah (USA)	19	Paris Saint-Germain (FRA)	€10M	Five-year contract	
1 July 2019	DF	Reinildo Mandava (MOZ)	25	Belenenses (POR)	Undisclosed	Signed permanently after option to buy	
1 July 2019	MF	Abou Ouattara (BFA)	19	KV Mechelen (BEL)	Undisclosed	Signed permanently after option to buy	
11 July 2019	DF	Saad Agouzoul (MAR)	21	Kawkab Marrakech (MAR)	€0.6M	Five-year contract	
13 July 2019	GK	Léo Jardim (BRA)	24	Rio Ave (POR)	Undisclosed	Five-year contract	
16 July 2019	MF	Manuel Cafumana (ANG)	20	1º de Agosto (ANG)	Undisclosed	Five-year contract	
17 July 2019	MF	Benjamin André (FRA)	28	Rennes (FRA)	Undisclosed	Four-year contract	
18 July 2019	FW	Virgiliu Postolachi (ROU)	19	Paris Saint-Germain (FRA)	Undisclosed	Four-year contract	
19 July 2019	DF	Domagoj Bradarić (CRO)	19	Hajduk Split (CRO)	€6.5M + €2M variables	Five-year contract	
1 August 2019	FW	Victor Osimhen (NGA)	20	Charleroi (BEL)		Five-year contract	
1 August 2019	DF	Tiago Djaló (POR)	19	Milan (ITA)	€5M	Five-year contract	
6 August 2019	MF	Yusuf Yazıcı (TUR)	22	Trabzonspor (TUR)	€16.5M	Five-year contract	
13 August 2019	DF	Eric Bocat (FRA)	20	Brest (FRA)		Three-year contract	
31 January 2020	MF	Nicolás Gaitán (ARG)	31	Chicago Fire (USA)	Free	Six month contract	

==== Loans in ====
Date	Pos.	Player	Age	Moving from	Date until	Notes	Source
29 August 2019	FW	Nana Antwi (GHA)	19	Lori FC (ARM)	End of season	loan with option to buy	

=== Out ===
Date	Pos.	Player	Age	Moving to	Fee	Notes	Source
10 June 2019	MF	Anwar El Ghazi (NED)	24	Aston Villa (ENG)	Undisclosed	Signed permanently after option to buy	
3 July 2019	MF	Thiago Mendes (BRA)	27	Lyon (FRA)	€25M		
3 July 2019	DF	Youssouf Koné (MLI)	23	Lyon (FRA)	€9M		
29 July 2019	MF	Chahreddine Boukholda (FRA)	23	Belenenses (POR)	Free		
1 August 2019	FW	Nicolas Pépé (CIV)	24	Arsenal (ENG)	€80M		
1 August 2019	FW	Rafael Leão (POR)	20	Milan (ITA)	€35M		
6 August 2019	DF	Edgar Ié (POR)	25	Trabzonspor (TUR)	Free		

==== Loans out ====
Date	Pos.	Player	Age	Moving to	Date until	Notes	Source
2 July 2019	DF	Scotty Sadzoute (FRA)	25	Pau (FRA)			
11 July 2019	MF	Rominigue Kouamé (MLI)	22	Cercle Brugge (BEL)		loan with option to buy	
15 July 2019	DF	Kouadio-Yves Dabila (CIV)	22	Cercle Brugge (BEL)			
22 July 2019	MF	Teddy Okou (FRA)	21	US Créteil (FRA)	End of season		
29 July 2019	MF	Imad Faraj (FRA)	19	Belenenses (POR)	End of season		
29 July 2019	GK	Hervé Koffi (BFA)	21	Belenenses (POR)	End of season		
29 July 2019	DF	Hakim Ouro-Sama (TOG)	20	Belenenses (POR)	End of season		
29 July 2019	FW	Charles-Andreas Brym (CAN)	19	Belenenses (POR)	End of season		
13 August 2019	MF	Manuel Cafumana (ANG)	20	Belenenses (POR)			
31 August 2019	MF	Yassine Benzia (ALG)	24	Olympiacos (GRE)	End of season		
22 January 2020	MF	Thiago Maia (BRA)	22	Flamengo (BRA)			

== Pre-season and friendlies ==
Win Draw Loss

9 July 2019 Friendly	Lille	2–1	Dunkerque	Camphin-en-Pévèle, France
17:00 CEST (UTC+2)	Callant 71' (o.g.); Mouaddib 82'	Report	Maçon 69'	Stadium: Domaine de Luchin

13 July 2019 Friendly	Lille	1–1	Reims	Saint-Quentin, France
18:00 CEST (UTC+2)	Rémy 3'	Report	Mbemba 90'	Stadium: Stade Paul Debrésie; Attendance: 712

19 July 2019 Friendly	Braga	0–2	Lille	Albufeira, Portugal
20:00 CEST (UTC+2)		Report	Rémy 45'; Leão 82'	Stadium: Estádio Municipal de Albufeira

20 July 2019 Friendly	Marítimo	0–0	Lille	Albufeira, Portugal
20:00 CEST (UTC+2)		Report		Stadium: Estádio da Nora

24 July 2019 Friendly	Portimonense	1–2	Lille	Portimão, Portugal
18:00 CEST (UTC+2)	Lucas 69'	Report	André 52'; Bamba 74' (pen.)	Stadium: Estádio Municipal

27 July 2019 Friendly	Celta Vigo	1–0	Lille	Vilagarcía de Arousa, Spain
20:30 CEST (UTC+2)	Kevin (yellow card) 52'; Sisto 73'	Report	Soumaoro (yellow card) 36'	Stadium: Estadio da Lomba

3 August 2019 Friendly	Lille	2–3	Roma	Villeneuve-d'Ascq, France
16:00 CEST (UTC+2)	Weah 19'; Luiz Araújo 73'	Report	Kolarov (yellow card) 17'; Ünder 51'; Zaniolo 62'; Cristante 90+1'	Stadium: Stade Pierre-Mauroy; Attendance: 23,042; Referee: Jérôme Brisard (France)

== Competitions ==
Win Draw Loss Fixtures

=== Overview ===
Competition	First match	Last match	Starting round	Final position	Record							
Competition	First match	Last match	Starting round	Final position	Pld	W	D	L	GF	GA	GD	Win %
Ligue 1	11 August 2019	8 March 2020	Matchday 1	4th	28	15	4	9	35	27	+8	53.57
Coupe de France	5 January 2020	29 January 2020	Round of 64	Round of 16	3	2	0	1	6	4	+2	66.67
Coupe de la Ligue	17 December 2019	21 January 2020	Round of 16	Semi-finals	3	2	1	0	7	2	+5	66.67
Champions League	17 September 2019	10 December 2019	Group stage	Group stage	6	0	1	5	4	14	−10	0.00
Total					40	19	6	15	52	47	+5	47.50

Source: Soccerway

=== Ligue 1 ===
==== League table ====
Pos	Team	Pld	W	D	L	GF	GA	GD	Pts	PPG	Qualification or relegation
2	Marseille	28	16	8	4	41	29	+12	56	2.00	Qualification for the Champions League group stage
3	Rennes	28	15	5	8	38	24	+14	50	1.79	Qualification for the Champions League group stage
4	Lille	28	15	4	9	35	27	+8	49	1.75	Qualification for the Europa League group stage (Note: Since the winners of the Coupe de France and the Coupe de la Ligue, Paris Saint-Germain, qualified for the Champions League, the spot given to the Coupe de France winners (Europa League group stage) was passed to the fifth-placed team and the spot given to the Coupe de la Ligue winners (Europa League second qualifying round) was passed to the sixth-placed team.)
5	Nice	28	11	8	9	41	38	+3	41 (Note: Nice finished ahead of Reims on head-to-head points: Nice 2–0 Reims, Reims 1–1 Nice.)	1.46	Qualification for the Europa League group stage
6	Reims	28	10	11	7	26	21	+5	41	1.46	Qualification for the Europa League second qualifying round

Source: Ligue 1
Rules for classification: 1) Points per game; 2) Head-to-head points; 3) Head-to-head goal difference; 4) Goal difference; 5) Goals scored; 6) Fairplay ranking.

==== Results summary ====
Overall								Home						Away					
Pld	W	D	L	GF	GA	GD	Pts	W	D	L	GF	GA	GD	W	D	L	GF	GA	GD
28	15	4	9	35	27	+8	49	11	2	2	24	9	+15	4	2	7	11	18	−7

Source: Competitive matches

==== Results by round ====
Round	1	2	3	4	5	6	7	8	9	10	11	12	13	14	15	16	17	18	19	20	21	22	23	24	25	26	27	28	29	30	31	32	33	34	35	36	37	38
Ground	H	A	H	A	H	A	H	A	H	A	H	A	H	A	H	A	H	H	A	A	H	A	H	A	H	H	A	H	A	H	A	A	H	A	H	A	H	A
Result	W	L	W	L	W	D	W	D	D	L	W	L	D	L	W	W	W	W	L	L	L	W	W	W	L	W	W	W	C	C	C	C	C	C	C	C	C	C
Position	5	10	5	9	5	6	3	4	5	7	3	5	5	10	8	4	3	3	4	5	7	4	4	4	4	4	4	4	4	4	4	4	4	4	4	4	4	4

Source: Ligue 1
A = Away; H = Home; W = Win; D = Draw; L = Loss; C = Cancelled

==== Matches ====
The Ligue 1 schedule was announced on 14 June 2019. The Ligue 1 matches were suspended by the LFP on 13 March 2020 due to COVID-19 until further notices. On 28 April 2020, it was announced that Ligue 1 and Ligue 2 campaigns would not resume, after the country banned all sporting events until September. On 30 April, The LFP ended officially the 2019–20 season.

11 August 2019 1	Lille	2–1	Nantes	Villeneuve-d'Ascq
15:00 CEST (UTC+2)	Osimhen 19', 80'; Bamba (yellow card) 49'; Weah (yellow card) 65'	Report	Fábio (yellow card) 43'; Traoré (yellow card) 45+3'; Çelik 51' (o.g.); Wagué (yellow card) 77'; Pallois (yellow card) 90+4'	Stadium: Stade Pierre-Mauroy; Attendance: 34,494; Referee: Mikael Lesage

17 August 2019 2	Amiens	1–0	Lille	Amiens
20:00 CEST (UTC+2)	Guirassy 70'; Ghoddos (yellow card) 87'	Report	Soumaré (red card) 39'; Ikoné (yellow card) 49'	Stadium: Stade de la Licorne; Attendance: 12,481; Referee: Karim Abed

28 August 2019 3	Lille	3–0	Saint-Étienne	Villeneuve-d'Ascq
19:00 CEST (UTC+2)	Osimhen 37', 74'; Bamba 69' (pen.)	Report		Stadium: Stade Pierre-Mauroy; Attendance: 36,138; Referee: Olivier Thual

1 September 2019 4	Reims	2–0	Lille	Reims
15:00 CEST (UTC+2)	Romao (yellow card) 36'; Doumbia 73' (pen.), (yellow card) 78'; Chavalerin (yellow card) 87'; Oudin 90'	Report	Yazıcı (yellow card) 40' (yellow-red card) 53'	Stadium: Stade Auguste Delaune; Attendance: 14,477; Referee: Eric Wattellier

13 September 2019 5	Lille	2–1	Angers	Villeneuve-d'Ascq
19:00 CEST (UTC+2)	Osimhen (yellow card) 36', (goal) 39'; Luiz Araújo 53'	Report	Thomas (yellow card) 67'; Bahoken 87'; Thioub (yellow card) 90+5'	Stadium: Stade Pierre-Mauroy; Attendance: 32,834; Referee: Ruddy Buquet

22 September 2019 6	Rennes	1–1	Lille	Rennes
15:00 CEST (UTC+2)	Raphinha (yellow card) 5'; Mendy (yellow card) 42'; Hunou 68'	Report	Çelik (yellow card) 10'; André (yellow card) 45'; Ikoné 47'	Stadium: Roazhon Park; Attendance: 25,772; Referee: Jérôme Brisard

25 September 2019 7	Lille	2–0	Strasbourg	Villeneuve-d'Ascq
19:00 CEST (UTC+2)	Osimhen 43'; Rémy 64'	Report	Sissoko (yellow card) 45'	Stadium: Stade Pierre-Mauroy; Attendance: 30,103; Referee: Johan Hamel

28 September 2019 8	Nice	1–1	Lille	Nice
20:00 CEST (UTC+2)	Dolberg 13'; Lusamba (yellow card) 30'; Danilo (yellow card) 90+4'	Report	Gabriel (yellow card) 14'; Luiz Araújo 24'; André (yellow card) 58'	Stadium: Allianz Riviera; Attendance: 18,295; Referee: Clément Turpin

6 October 2019 9	Lille	2–2	Nîmes	Villeneuve-d'Ascq
15:00 CEST (UTC+2)	Rémy 12'; Osimhen (yellow card) 38', (goal) 79'; Fonte (yellow card) 45+3'; André (yellow card) 73'	Report	Ripart 45+5' (pen.); Philippoteaux (yellow card) 53'; Denkey 71'	Stadium: Stade Pierre-Mauroy; Attendance: 31,542; Referee: Mikael Lesage

19 October 2019 10	Toulouse	2–1	Lille	Toulouse
20:00 CEST (UTC+2)	Saïd (yellow card) 15'; Sanogo (yellow card) 40', (goal) 58'; Gradel 66' (pen.)	Report	Xeka (yellow card) 71'; Luiz Araújo (yellow card) 73'; Pied (yellow card) 81'; Fonte (yellow card) 90', (goal) 90+3'	Stadium: Stadium de Toulouse; Attendance: 12,277; Referee: Stéphanie Frappart

26 October 2019 11	Lille	3–0	Bordeaux	Villeneuve-d'Ascq
17:30 CEST (UTC+2)	André 22'; Yazıcı 62' (pen.); Rémy 90+1'	Report	Aït Bennasser (yellow card) 15'; Koscielny (yellow card) 59'	Stadium: Stade Pierre-Mauroy; Attendance: 35,925; Referee: Willy Delajod

2 November 2019 12	Marseille	2–1	Lille	Marseille
17:30 CET (UTC+1)	Sanson 48'; Gabriel 80' (o.g.); Amavi (yellow card) 83'	Report	Djaló (yellow card) 23'; Ikoné (yellow card) 33'; Soumaoro 83'; Osimhen (yellow card) 83'	Stadium: Stade Vélodrome; Attendance: 53,321; Referee: Hakim Ben El Hadj

9 November 2019 13	Lille	0–0	Metz	Villeneuve-d'Ascq
20:00 CET (UTC+1)	Reinildo (yellow card) 63'; André (yellow card) 76'	Report	Delaine (yellow card) 50'; Oukidja (yellow card) 74'	Stadium: Stade Pierre-Mauroy; Attendance: 33,425; Referee: Florent Batta

22 November 2019 14	Paris Saint-Germain	2–0	Lille	Paris
20:45 CET (UTC+1)	Icardi 17'; Kimpembe (yellow card) 20'; Meunier (yellow card) 30'; Di María 31'	Report		Stadium: Parc des Princes; Attendance: 47,476; Referee: Willy Delajod

30 November 2019 15	Lille	1–0	Dijon	Villeneuve-d'Ascq
20:00 CET (UTC+1)	Pied (yellow card) 42'; Osimhen 45+6' (pen.); Reinildo (yellow card) 80'	Report	Ecuele Manga (yellow card) 51'	Stadium: Stade Pierre-Mauroy; Attendance: 40,074; Referee: Jérémy Stinat

3 December 2019 16	Lyon	0–1	Lille	Décines-Charpieu
21:05 CET (UTC+1)	Rafael (yellow card) 79'	Report	Çelik (yellow card) 59'; Ikoné 68'; Sanches (yellow card) 78'	Stadium: Parc Olympique Lyonnais; Attendance: 42,535; Referee: Ruddy Buquet

6 December 2019 17	Lille	1–0	Brest	Villeneuve-d'Ascq
19:00 CET (UTC+1)	Osimhen 16'	Report	Larsonneur (yellow card) 90+2'	Stadium: Stade Pierre-Mauroy; Attendance: 32,682; Referee: Eric Wattellier

13 December 2019 18	Lille	2–1	Montpellier	Villeneuve-d'Ascq
20:45 CET (UTC+1)	André (yellow card) 25'; Ikoné 40' (pen.), (yellow card) 85'; Sanches 84', (yellow card) 85'	Report	Savanier (yellow card) 37'; Delort 74'	Stadium: Stade Pierre-Mauroy; Attendance: 30,170; Referee: Jérôme Brisard

21 December 2019 19	Monaco	5–1	Lille	Monaco
20:45 CET (UTC+1)	Martins 23'; Golovin (yellow card) 28'; Keita 30'; Maripán (yellow card) 31'; Ben Yedder 53', 65'; Aguilar (yellow card) 70'; Subašić (yellow card) 78', (red card) 78'; Glik 90+3'	Report	Fonte (yellow card) 9'; Osimhen 14'	Stadium: Stade Louis II; Attendance: 5,388; Referee: Mikael Lesage

12 January 2020 20	Dijon	1–0	Lille	Dijon
17:00 CET (UTC+1)	Mendyl (red card) 21'; Chouiar (yellow card) 38'; Tavares 47'; Nounchili (yellow card) 72'	Report	Soumaré (yellow card) 41' (yellow-red card) 67'; Xeka (yellow card) 49'; Bradarić (yellow card) 71'	Stadium: Stade Gaston Gérard; Attendance: 12,115; Referee: Frank Schneider

26 January 2020 21	Lille	0–2	Paris Saint-Germain	Villeneuve-d'Ascq
21:00 CET (UTC+1)	Mandava (yellow card) 10'; André (yellow card) 38'; Gabriel (yellow card) 51'	Report	Neymar 28', 52' (pen.); Gueye (yellow card) 81'	Stadium: Stade Pierre-Mauroy; Attendance: 49,132; Referee: Amaury Delerue

1 February 2020 22	Strasbourg	1–2	Lille	Strasbourg
20:00 CET (UTC+1)	Thomasson 12'; Carole (yellow card) 79'	Report	Çelik (yellow card) 35'; Xeka (yellow card) 42'; Gabriel (yellow card) 62', (goal) 65'; Osimhen 80' (pen.); André (yellow card) 87'	Stadium: Stade de la Meinau; Attendance: 25,137; Referee: Stéphanie Frappart

4 February 2020 23	Lille	1–0	Rennes	Villeneuve-d'Ascq
19:00 CET (UTC+1)	Rémy 4', (yellow card) 56'; Ikoné (yellow card) 44'; Sanches (yellow card) 83'	Report	Traoré (yellow card) 54'	Stadium: Stade Pierre-Mauroy; Attendance: 35,030; Referee: Johan Hamel

7 February 2020 24	Angers	0–2	Lille	Angers
20:45 CET (UTC+1)	Traoré (yellow card) 56'; Thioub (yellow card) 85'; Ninga (yellow card) 89'	Report	Osimhen 14'; Çelik (yellow card) 38'; Mandava (yellow card) 51'; Ikoné (yellow card) 53'; Sanches 75'	Stadium: Stade Raymond Kopa; Attendance: 9,145; Referee: Benoît Bastien

16 February 2020 25	Lille	1–2	Marseille	Villeneuve-d'Ascq
21:00 CET (UTC+1)	Osimhen 51'	Report	Ćaleta-Car (yellow card) 9'; Amavi (yellow card) 30'; Benedetto (yellow card) 35', (goal) 69'; Reinildo 66' (o.g.); Aké (yellow card) 90+1'; Strootman (yellow card) 90+3'	Stadium: Stade Pierre-Mauroy; Attendance: 47,314; Referee: Frank Schneider

22 February 2020 26	Lille	3–0	Toulouse	Villeneuve-d'Ascq
20:00 CET (UTC+1)	Rémy 2', 39'; Osimhen (yellow card) 40'; Sanches 72'	Report	Leya Iseka (yellow card) 24'; Sangaré (yellow card) 89'; Vainqueur (yellow card) 90+1'	Stadium: Stade Pierre-Mauroy; Attendance: 37,034; Referee: Thomas Léonard

1 March 2020 27	Nantes	0–1	Lille	Nantes
15:00 CET (UTC+1)	Lafont (yellow card) 8'; Abeid (yellow card) 32'; Pallois (yellow card) 45+1'; Coulibaly (yellow card) 66'	Report	Ikoné (yellow card) 55'; André 58'; Fonte (yellow card) 68'; Xeka (yellow card) 90+3'	Stadium: Stade de la Beaujoire; Attendance: 20,704; Referee: Willy Delajod

8 March 2020 28	Lille	1–0	Lyon	Villeneuve-d'Ascq
21:00 CET (UTC+1)	Rémy 33', (yellow card) 45+1'	Report	Toko Ekambi (yellow card) 57'; Traoré (yellow card) 70'; Tousart (yellow card) 78'	Stadium: Stade Pierre-Mauroy; Attendance: 40,164; Referee: Benoît Bastien

29	Brest	Cancelled	Lille	Brest
--:-- CET (UTC+1)				Stadium: Stade Francis-Le Blé; Attendance: 0

30	Lille	Cancelled	Monaco	Villeneuve-d'Ascq
--:-- CET (UTC+1)				Stadium: Stade Pierre-Mauroy; Attendance: 0

31	Montpellier	Cancelled	Lille	Montpellier
--:-- CEST (UTC+2)				Stadium: Stade de la Mosson; Attendance: 0

32	Metz	Cancelled	Lille	Metz
--:-- CEST (UTC+2)				Stadium: Stade Saint-Symphorien

33	Lille	Cancelled	Nice	Villeneuve-d'Ascq
--:-- CEST (UTC+2)				Stadium: Stade Pierre-Mauroy

34	Nîmes	Cancelled	Lille	Nîmes
--:-- CEST (UTC+2)				Stadium: Stade des Costières

35	Lille	Cancelled	Reims	Villeneuve-d'Ascq
--:-- CEST (UTC+2)				Stadium: Stade Pierre-Mauroy

36	Saint-Étienne	Cancelled	Lille	Saint-Étienne
--:-- CEST (UTC+2)				Stadium: Stade Geoffroy-Guichard

37	Lille	Cancelled	Amiens	Villeneuve-d'Ascq
--:-- CEST (UTC+2)				Stadium: Stade Pierre-Mauroy

38	Bordeaux	Cancelled	Lille	Bordeaux
--:-- CEST (UTC+2)				Stadium: Matmut Atlantique

=== Coupe de France ===
5 January 2020 Round of 64	US Raon-l'Étape	2–3	Lille	Raon-l'Étape
14:15 CET (UTC+1)	Bah (yellow card) 55'; Duminy 76'; Hassidou 83' (pen.)	Report	Luiz Araújo 14'; Fonte 47', (yellow card) 81'; Soumaoro (yellow card) 54'; Rémy 64'	Stadium: Stade Paul Gasser; Attendance: 3,779; Referee: Jérémie Pignard

18 January 2020 Round of 32	ESM Gonfreville	0–2	Lille	Le Havre
15:00 CET (UTC+1)	Bangala (yellow card) 85'	Report	Rémy 69'; Osimhen 90+2'	Stadium: Stade Océane; Attendance: 15,491; Referee: Willy Delajod

29 January 2020 Round of 16	SAS Épinal	2–1	Lille	Épinal
18:30 CET (UTC+1)	Borodine (yellow card) 25'; Luvualu (yellow card) 37'; Krasso 56', 62'; Biron (yellow card) 81'; Léonard (yellow card) 90+2'	Report	Rémy 8'; Bocat (yellow card) 43'; Xeka (yellow card) 61'; Gabriel (yellow card) 90+4'	Stadium: Stade de la Colombière; Attendance: 3,500; Referee: Jérôme Miguelgorry

=== Coupe de la Ligue ===
17 December 2019 Round of 16	Monaco	0–3	Lille	Monaco
21:05 CET (UTC+1)		Report	Osimhen 19'; Bradarić (yellow card) 31'; André (yellow card) 45+1'; Rémy 45+2', 86'; Xeka (yellow card) 48'; Soumaoro (yellow card) 54'	Stadium: Stade Louis II; Attendance: 5,384; Referee: Johan Hamel

8 January 2020 Quarter-finals	Lille	2–0	Amiens	Villeneuve-d'Ascq
21:05 CET (UTC+1)	André (yellow card) 45+1'; Luiz Araújo 50'; Osimhen 58'; Léo (yellow card) 90+2'	Report	Zungu (yellow card) 21' (yellow-red card) 38'; Calabresi (yellow card) 87'	Stadium: Stade Pierre-Mauroy; Attendance: 19,029; Referee: Benoît Bastien

21 January 2020 Semi-finals	Lyon	2–2 (4–3 p)	Lille	Décines-Charpieu
21:10 CET (UTC+1)	Dembélé 17' (pen.); T. Mendes (yellow card) 37'; Marçal (yellow card) 81'; Aouar 85'; Rafael (yellow card) 90+1'; Denayer (yellow card) 90+2'; Marcelo (yellow card) 90+4'	Report	Sanches 12'; Mandava (yellow card) 59'; Rémy 90+3' (pen.)	Stadium: Parc Olympique Lyonnais; Attendance: 35,248; Referee: Benoît Millot
	Penalties
	Dembélé (penalty scored); Terrier (penalty scored); Cornet (penalty scored); T. Mendes (penalty scored)		(penalty missed) Bamba; (penalty scored) Rémy; (penalty scored) André; (penalty scored) Osimhen; (penalty missed) Sanches

=== UEFA Champions League ===
==== Group stage ====
Group H

Pos	Team	Pld	W	D	L	GF	GA	GD	Pts	Qualification	VAL	CHE	AJX	LIL
1	(Spain) Valencia	6	3	2	1	9	7	+2	11 (Note: Head-to-head points: Valencia 4, Chelsea 1.)	Advance to knockout phase	—	2–2	0–3	4–1
2	(England) Chelsea	6	3	2	1	11	9	+2	11	Advance to knockout phase	0–1	—	4–4	2–1
3	(Netherlands) Ajax	6	3	1	2	12	6	+6	10	Transfer to Europa League	0–1	0–1	—	3–0
4	(France) Lille	6	0	1	5	4	14	−10	1		1–1	1–2	0–2	—

Source: UEFA
Rules for classification: Group stage tiebreakers
Notes:

17 September 2019 1	Ajax (Netherlands)	3–0	(France) Lille	Amsterdam, Netherlands
21:00 CEST (UTC+2)	Promes 18'; Onana (yellow card) 39'; Álvarez 50'; Tagliafico 62'	Report	Sanches (yellow card) 39'	Stadium: Johan Cruyff Arena; Attendance: 51,441; Referee: Srđan Jovanović (Serbia)

2 October 2019 2	Lille (France)	1–2	(England) Chelsea	Villeneuve-d'Ascq, France
21:00 CEST (UTC+2)	Osimhen 33'; Ikoné (yellow card) 44'	Report	Abraham 22'; James (yellow card) 35'; Willian 78'	Stadium: Stade Pierre-Mauroy; Attendance: 48,523; Referee: Aleksei Kulbakov (Belarus)

23 October 2019 3	Lille (France)	1–1	(Spain) Valencia	Villeneuve-d'Ascq, France
21:00 CEST (UTC+2)	Çelik (yellow card) 21'; Luiz Araújo (yellow card) 42'; Djaló (yellow card) 86'; Ikoné 90+5'; Gabriel (yellow card) 90+8'	Report	Cheryshev 63'; Diakhaby (yellow card) 82' (yellow-red card) 84'; Gómez (yellow card) 90+3'	Stadium: Stade Pierre-Mauroy; Attendance: 47,488; Referee: Deniz Aytekin (Germany)

5 November 2019 4	Valencia (Spain)	4–1	(France) Lille	Valencia, Spain
21:00 CET (UTC+1)	Garay (yellow card) 31'; Parejo 66' (pen.); Wass (yellow card) 67'; Soumaoro 82' (o.g.); Kondogbia 84'; Torres 90'	Report	Gabriel (yellow card) 21'; Osimhen 25'; André (yellow card) 37'; Fonte (yellow card) 65'; Bradarić (yellow card) 80'	Stadium: Mestalla; Attendance: 38,252; Referee: Sergei Karasev (Russia)

27 November 2019 5	Lille (France)	0–2	(Netherlands) Ajax	Villeneuve-d'Ascq, France
21:00 CET (UTC+1)	Mandava (yellow card) 29'; Osimhen (yellow card) 37'	Report	Ziyech 2'; Mazraoui (yellow card) 27'; Promes 59'	Stadium: Stade Pierre-Mauroy; Attendance: 48,612; Referee: Felix Brych (Germany)

10 December 2019 6	Chelsea (England)	2–1	(France) Lille	London, England
21:00 CET (UTC+1)	Abraham 19'; Azpilicueta 35'; Zouma (yellow card) 45+1'	Report	Çelik (yellow card) 40'; Xeka (yellow card) 67'; Rémy 78'	Stadium: Stamford Bridge; Attendance: 40,016; Referee: Anastasios Sidiropoulos (Greece)

== Statistics ==
=== Appearances and goals ===
No.	Pos	Nat	Player	Total		Ligue 1		Coupe de France		Coupe de la Ligue		UEFA Champions League	
No.	Pos	Nat	Player	Apps	Goals	Apps	Goals	Apps	Goals	Apps	Goals	Apps	Goals
Goalkeepers
1	GK	(Brazil) BRA	Léo Jardim	4	0	0	0	0	0	3	0	0+1	0
16	GK	(France) FRA	Mike Maignan	37	0	28	0	3	0	0	0	6	0
40	GK	(Slovakia) SVK	Adam Jakubech	0	0	0	0	0	0	0	0	0	0
Defenders
2	DF	(Portugal) POR	Tiago Djaló	14	0	8	0	2	0	0+1	0	3	0
3	DF	(Morocco) MAR	Saad Agouzoul	0	0	0	0	0	0	0	0	0	0
4	DF	(Brazil) BRA	Gabriel	34	1	23+1	1	1	0	3	0	6	0
5	DF	(France) FRA	Adama Soumaoro	10	1	4+2	1	2	0	1	0	1	0
6	DF	(Portugal) POR	José Fonte	33	2	25	1	2	1	2	0	4	0
17	DF	(Turkey) TUR	Zeki Çelik	32	0	23	0	1	0	1+1	0	6	0
26	DF	(France) FRA	Jérémy Pied	9	0	5	0	1	0	2	0	1	0
28	DF	(Mozambique) MOZ	Reinildo Mandava	21	0	12+4	0	1+1	0	2+1	0	0	0
29	DF	(Croatia) CRO	Domagoj Bradarić	23	0	16+2	0	1	0	1	0	3	0
	DF	(France) FRA	Eric Junior Bocat	1	0	0	0	1	0	0	0	0	0
Midfielders
8	MF	(Portugal) POR	Xeka	25	0	8+9	0	3	0	1+1	0	1+2	0
10	MF	(France) FRA	Jonathan Ikoné	36	4	26+2	3	2	0	2	0	3+1	1
12	MF	(Turkey) TUR	Yusuf Yazıcı	25	1	9+9	1	0	0	0+1	0	4+2	0
18	MF	(Portugal) POR	Renato Sanches	30	4	16+3	3	1+2	0	3	1	1+4	0
20	MF	(Argentina) ARG	Nicolás Gaitán	4	0	0+4	0	0	0	0	0	0	0
21	MF	(France) FRA	Benjamin André	36	2	23+3	2	1+1	0	3	0	5	0
24	MF	(France) FRA	Boubakary Soumaré	30	0	15+5	0	2	0	2	0	6	0
33	MF	(Senegal) SEN	Cheikh Niasse	1	0	0+1	0	0	0	0	0	0	0
34	MF	(Cameroon) CMR	Jean Onana	1	0	1	0	0	0	0	0	0	0
	MF	(Burkina Faso) BFA	Abou Ouattara	1	0	0+1	0	0	0	0	0	0	0
Forwards
7	FW	(Nigeria) NGR	Victor Osimhen	38	18	25+2	13	0+3	1	3	2	5	2
9	FW	(France) FRA	Loïc Rémy	30	14	11+9	7	3	3	0+3	3	2+2	1
11	FW	(Brazil) BRA	Luiz Araújo	33	4	7+14	2	3	1	2+1	1	3+3	0
14	FW	(France) FRA	Jonathan Bamba	37	1	22+4	1	3	0	2	0	3+3	0
22	FW	(United States) USA	Timothy Weah	3	0	1+2	0	0	0	0	0	0	0
Players transferred out during the season
20	MF	(Brazil) BRA	Thiago Maia	5	0	0+3	0	0+1	0	0	0	1	0
23	MF	(Angola) ANG	Manuel Cafumana	0	0	0	0	0	0	0	0	0	0

Last updated: 8 March 2020
Source: Competitions

=== Goalscorers ===
Rank	No.	Pos	Nat	Name	Ligue 1	Coupe de France	Coupe de la Ligue	Champions League	Total
1	7	FW	(Nigeria)	Victor Osimhen	13	1	2	2	18
2	9	FW	(France)	Loïc Rémy	7	3	3	1	14
3	10	MF	(France)	Jonathan Ikoné	3	0	0	1	4
3	11	FW	(Brazil)	Luiz Araújo	2	1	1	0	4
3	18	MF	(Portugal)	Renato Sanches	3	0	1	0	4
6	6	DF	(Portugal)	José Fonte	1	1	0	0	2
6	21	MF	(France)	Benjamin André	2	0	0	0	2
8	4	DF	(Brazil)	Gabriel	1	0	0	0	1
8	5	DF	(France)	Adama Soumaoro	1	0	0	0	1
8	12	MF	(Turkey)	Yusuf Yazıcı	1	0	0	0	1
8	14	FW	(France)	Jonathan Bamba	1	0	0	0	1
Own goal					0	0	0	0	0
Totals					35	6	7	4	52

Last updated: 8 March 2020
