= Tosin =

Tosin or Tošin (Serbian Cyrillic: Тошин) may refer to:

== People ==
- Tosin (footballer) (Paulo César Tosin, born 1966), Brazilian footballer
- Tosin (given name), a Yoruba name

== Places ==
- Tosin, Bełchatów County, a village in central Poland
- Tošin Bunar, an urban neighborhood of Belgrade, Serbia
  - Tošin Bunar railway station
