= Tosin (given name) =

Tósìn
- Gender: Unisex
- Language: Yoruba

Origin
- Origin: Yoruba
- Meaning: worthy to be served
- Region of origin: South western Nigeria

Other names
- Related names: Olúwatósìn, Olúwatómisìn, Olútósìn

listen

Tósìn is a Nigerian unisex given name of Yoruba origin meaning "worthy to be served." or "enough to worship". It is a diminutive version of "Olúwatósìn" meaning God is worthy to be served, and Olúwatómisìn which means Lord is sufficient for me to worship.

== Notable people with the name include ==
- Tosin Abasi (born 1983), Nigerian American musician
- Tosin Adarabioyo (born 1997), English footballer
- Tosin Adeloye (born 1996), Nigerian sprinter
- Tosin Ajibade (born 1987), Nigerian writer
- Tosin Cole (born 1992), British actor
- Tosin Damilola Atolagbe (born 1994), Nigerian badminton player
- Tosin Dosunmu (born 1980), Nigerian footballer
- Tosin Eniolorunda (born 1985), Nigerian software engineer and entrepreneur
- Tosin Jegede, Nigerian singer
- Tosin Ogunode (born 1994), Nigerian-Qatari sprinter
- Tosin Oke (born 1980), Nigerian triple jumper
- Tosin Olufemi (born 1994), English footballer

== See also ==
- Tosin (disambiguation)
- Tonin (name)
- Tosia, name
