= Tiago Djaló =

Portuguese footballer (born 2000)

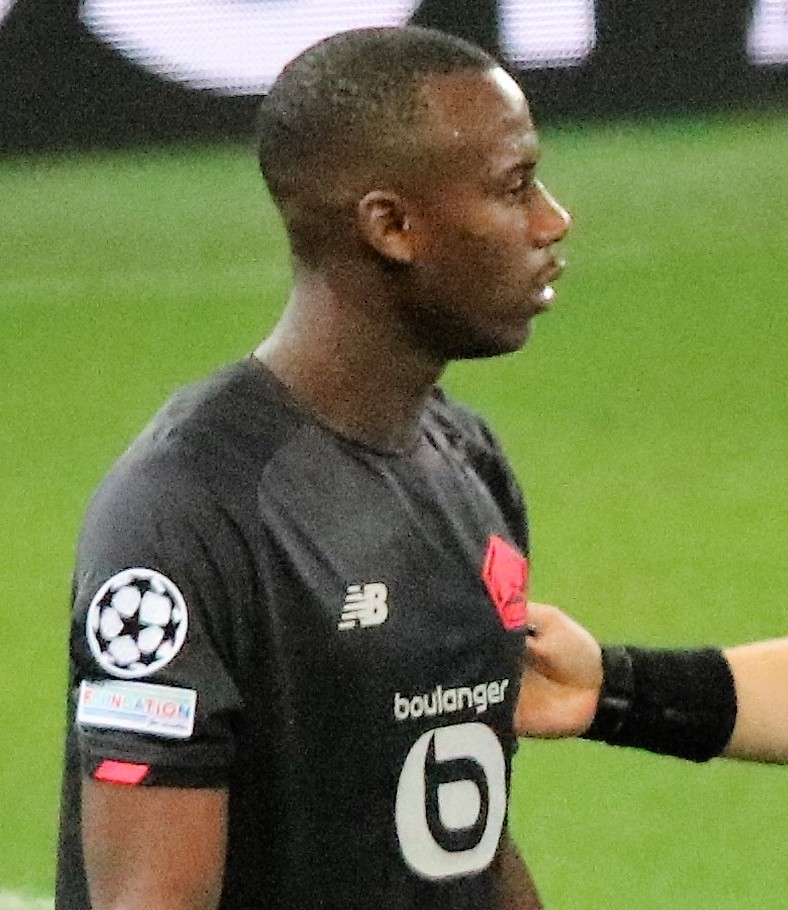
- Djaló with Lille in 2021

Personal information
- Full name: Tiago Emanuel Embaló Djaló
- Date of birth: 9 April 2000 (age 26)
- Place of birth: Amadora, Portugal
- Height: 1.90 m (6 ft 3 in)
- Position: Centre-back

Team information
- Current team: Beşiktaş
- Number: 35

Youth career
- 2009–2012: Metralhas
- 2012–2013: Damaiense
- 2013–2018: Sporting CP

Senior career*
Years	Team	Apps	(Gls)
2017–2018	Sporting CP B	12	(1)
2019	AC Milan	0	(0)
2019–2024	Lille	78	(3)
2024–2025	Juventus	1	(0)
2024–2025	→ Porto (loan)	8	(0)
2025–	Beşiktaş	25	(2)

International career
2016–2017	Portugal U17	14	(0)
2018	Portugal U18	3	(1)
2018	Portugal U19	1	(0)
2019–2022	Portugal U21	8	(0)
2024	Portugal	1	(0)
Medal record
Men's football
Representing Portugal
UEFA European Under-21 Championship
Runner-up	2021
- * Club domestic league appearances and goals as of 22:21, 22 November 2026 (UTC)

Tiago Emanuel Embaló Djaló (Portuguese pronunciation: [tiˈaɣu dʒɐˈlɔ]; 9 April 2000) is a Portuguese professional footballer who plays as a centre-back for Süper Lig club Beşiktaş.

== Club career ==
=== Sporting CP ===
Djaló was born in Amadora, Lisbon metropolitan area to Bissau-Guinean parents, and he joined Sporting CP's academy in 2013 from Sport Futebol Damaiense. On 24 February 2018, still a junior, he made his professional debut in the LigaPro with their reserves, playing 74 minutes in a 2–2 home draw against Académica de Coimbra.

On 11 April 2018, Djaló scored his first goal in the second division, closing the 1–1 home draw with Famalicão.

=== AC Milan ===
In January 2019, Djaló was signed by AC Milan as his contract with Sporting was about to expire. In July, alongside several other youth team players, he was invited to train with the first team by newly appointed coach Marco Giampaolo. He appeared in his only match for the club in a friendly with Novara, coming on as a second-half substitute.

=== Lille ===
Djaló joined Lille on 1 August 2019 on a five-year deal, for an undisclosed fee reported to be within the area of €5 million. He made his debut in the French Ligue 1 ten days later, starting in central defence alongside his compatriot José Fonte in the 2–1 home victory over Nantes. He first appeared in the UEFA Champions League on 23 October, featuring 87 minutes in a 1–1 draw against Valencia in the group stage also at the Stade Pierre-Mauroy.

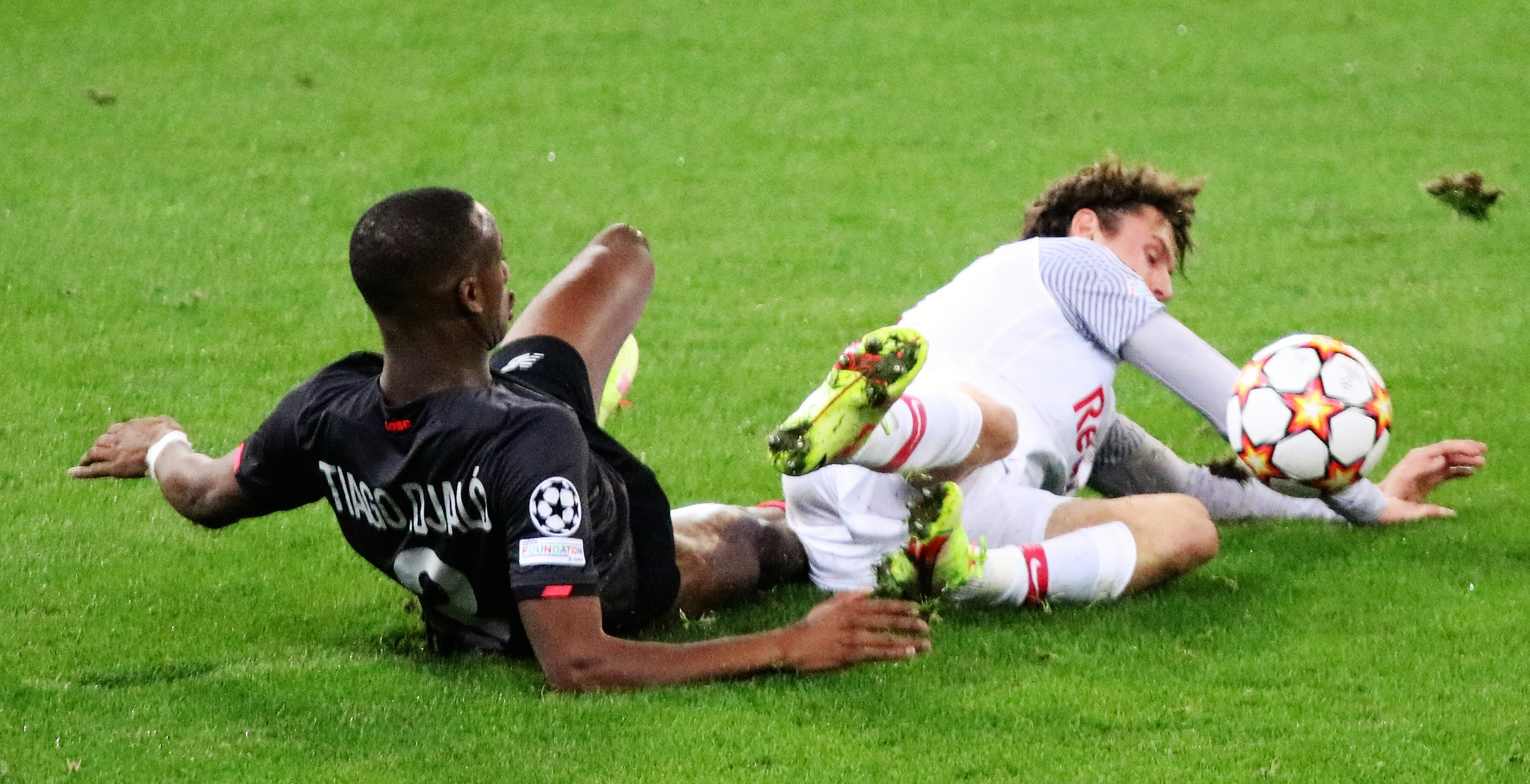
Djaló against Salzburg in 2021

In the 2020–21 season, Djaló contributed 17 games to help his team win the national championship for the first time since 2011. On 1 August, he started as Lille won the Trophée des Champions 1–0 against Paris Saint-Germain at Bloomfield Stadium in Tel Aviv, Israel. He scored his first league goal on 6 November that year, opening an eventual 1–1 home draw with Angers.

On 4 March 2023, early in a league fixture away to Lens, Djaló suffered an anterior cruciate ligament injury, being sidelined for several months. During his spell, he made 102 appearances in all competitions.

=== Juventus ===
On 22 January 2024, Djaló returned to the Italian Serie A, signing a contract until June 2026 with Juventus; the club paid a reported €3.6 million transfer fee, which could rise to €5.1 million with add-ons. He remained on the bench in the final of the Coppa Italia on 15 May, a 1–0 win over Atalanta in Rome. His league debut took place ten days later, when he played 16 minutes of the 2–0 victory against Monza.

Djaló moved to Porto on 2 September 2024, on a season-long loan. He scored on his debut on 20 October, closing the 3–0 win at amateurs Sintrense in the third round of the Taça de Portugal. He repeated the feat the next game, opening a 2–0 home defeat of TSG Hoffenheim in the league phase of the UEFA Europa League to become the club's first-ever defender to achieve this.

However, after manager Vítor Bruno's dismissal and his replacement by Martín Anselmi in January 2025, Djaló was involved in several off-field problems and deemed surplus to requirements.

=== Beşiktaş ===
On 27 August 2025, Djaló joined Beşiktaş on a permanent three-year deal for €3.5 million.

== International career ==
Djaló won 26 caps for Portugal at youth level. His first for the under-21 side occurred on 14 November 2019, in a 0–0 friendly draw against Slovenia held in Estoril.

On 21 March 2022, Djaló received his first call-up to the senior squad, after Pepe tested positive for COVID-19 ahead of the 2022 FIFA World Cup qualification play-offs against Turkey. In October, he was named in a preliminary 55-man squad for the finals in Qatar.

Djaló finally made his full debut on 18 November 2024, playing 27 minutes of the 1–1 draw in Croatia for the UEFA Nations League in place of fellow debutant Tomás Araújo; Portugal had already secured first place in their group with one fixture remaining.

== Personal life ==
Djaló is multilingual, being fluent in English, French, Cape Verdean Creole and Guinea-Bissau Creole apart from his native Portuguese. He also speaks some Spanish.

== Career statistics ==
=== Club ===
As of match played 5 November 2026

Appearances and goals by club, season and competition
Club	Season	League			National cup (Note: Includes Coupe de France, Taça de Portugal, Turkish Cup)		League cup (Note: Includes Coupe de la Ligue)		Europe		Other		Total	
Club	Season	Division	Apps	Goals	Apps	Goals	Apps	Goals	Apps	Goals	Apps	Goals	Apps	Goals
Sporting CP B	2017–18	LigaPro	12	1	—		—		—		—		12	1
Sporting CP B	Total		12	1	—		—		—		—		12	1
AC Milan	2018–19	Serie A	0	0	0	0	—		—		—		0	0
Lille	2019–20	Ligue 1	8	0	2	0	1	0	3 (Note: Appearances in UEFA Champions League)	0	—		14	0
Lille	2020–21	Ligue 1	17	0	3	0	—		4 (Note: Appearances in UEFA Europa League)	0	—		24	0
Lille	2021–22	Ligue 1	28	1	2	0	—		7	0	1 (Note: Appearance in Trophée des Champions)	0	38	1
Lille	2022–23	Ligue 1	25	2	1	0	—		—		—		26	2
Lille	2023–24	Ligue 1	0	0	0	0	—		0	0	—		0	0
Lille	Total		78	3	8	0	1	0	14	0	1	0	102	3
Juventus	2023–24	Serie A	1	0	0	0	—		—		—		1	0
Porto (loan)	2024–25	Primeira Liga	8	0	2	1	0	0	7	1	0	0	17	2
Beşiktaş	2025–26	Süper Lig	18	2	4	0	—		—		—		22	2
Beşiktaş	2026–27	Süper Lig	6	0	0	0	—		9	0	—		15	0
Beşiktaş	Total		24	2	4	0	—		9	0	—		37	2
Career total			123	6	14	1	1	0	30	1	1	0	169	8

=== International ===
Appearances and goals by national team and year
National team	Year	Apps	Goals
Portugal	2024	1	0
Total		1	0

== Honours ==
Lille

- Ligue 1: 2020–21
- Trophée des Champions: 2021

Juventus

- Coppa Italia: 2023–24
