= Oluwatosin Olatujoye =

Nigerian businessman (born 1987)

- Born: Oluwatosin Olatujoye; 30 March 1987 (age 39); Nigeria
- Education: London Business School, Lagos Business School
- Occupations: Real estate developer, businessman
- Known for: CEO of "Zylus Homes and Properties"
- Website: oluwatosinolatujoye.org

Oluwatosin Olatujoye (born 30 March 1987) is a Nigerian businessman who is the Group CEO of Zylus Homes and Properties.

== Early life and education ==
Olatujoye was born in Nigeria in 1987 and studied at the Lagos Business School and at the London Business School. Olatujoye attended London Business School, then proceeded to the School of Estate, where he received a certificate in entrepreneurship from the Metropolitan School of Business and Management in the UK.

He obtained a professional post-graduate certificate in Real Estate & Asset Valuation Management, Proficiency in Human Resources Management, Certified International Strategic Management (CISM), Proficiency in International Strategic Management (PISM), and Certificate in Entrepreneur Management (CEM) from the Enterprise Development Center, PAN Atlantic University, and Lagos Business School.

== Career ==
Olatujoye began his career in the insurance sector in 2007 at the American International Insurance Company (AIICO Insurance) as a sales representative and then the branch manager.

He became the CEO of Oga for Property Investment Ltd. The company's name was changed to Zylus Homes and Property.

== Other positions ==
He is the founder of the Tosin Olatujoye Foundation which helps widows and children.

In 2023, Olatujoye was appointed to be a member of the Forbes Council. He is a member of the Project Management Professional Institute (PMPI), the International Strategic Management Institute (ISMI)-UK.

He is also a fellow at the Institute of Credit Administration.

== Recognition ==
- 2016 AIICO's Best Unit Manager Award
- Nelson Mandela Leadership Award of Excellence and Integrity as West African Man by ECOWAS Youth Council, March 2021
- Honorary Doctor of Science in Entrepreneurship and Strategic Business Management by the International Entrepreneur University, USA.
- 2023 Excellence in Business and Corporate Administration by African Achievers Awards UK
