= Moniepoint Inc. =

Nigerian fintech company

- Native name: Moniepoint
- Industry: Business Banking; Financial Technology
- Founded: June 2015; 11 years ago
- Founders: Tosin Eniolorunda, Felix Ike
- Headquarters: Lagos, Nigeria
- Key people: Tosin Eniolorunda (CEO); Felix Ike (CTO)
- Products: Point of Sale (POS) terminals; Business Banking; Personal Banking; Working Capital Loans
- Website: Website

Moniepoint (formerly TeamApt) is a Nigerian fintech company based in Lagos that provides banking services and loans via an online banking app. The company was founded by Tosin Eniolorunda and Felix Ike in 2015. In November 2024, Bayo Olujobi was appointed its chief financial officer (CFO).

== History ==
Moniepoint was founded in 2015 by business executives Tosin Eniolorunda and Felix Ike. It was initially founded under the name, TeamApt.

In March 2019, Moniepoint announced funding of $5.5 million in a Series A fundraising from Quantum Capital Partners. In November 2019, Moniepoint received a switching license from the Central Bank of Nigeria.

In 2021, the company announced an undisclosed capital in a Series B Funding round led by Novastar Ventures. It also fundraised the $50 million in pre-series C funding led by QED investors.

In March 2023, Moniepoint led the $3 million seed investment round for Nigerian neobank Payday.

In July 2023, the company launched its personal banking service. By January 2026, the Central Bank of Nigeria officially upgraded the operating license of its subsidiary, Moniepoint Microfinance Bank, to a national status.

In 2023, Moniepoint got listed by the Financial Times as the Second-Fastest Growing Company in Africa.

In October 2024, Moniepoint became the African continent's eighth unicorn at a valuation of over US$1 billion after it announced a US$110 million Series C funding round. Development Partners International’s African Development Partners (ADP) III fund, Google’s Africa Investment Fund led the round. Lightrock also participated in the round.

In 2025, the company announced an extension of its Series C round, raising an additional $90 million and bringing the total Series C funding to over $200 million.

In 2025, Moniepoint Inc. reported the digital payment infrastructure is accelerating the growth of Nigeria's food service industry, projected to reach US$11.09 biilion in 2025. The report highlights innovation such as instant settlement, automated payment verification, and transaction-based lending as key drivers of efficiency, financial inclusion, and business growth.

In 2026, Moniepoint in partner with Google, Women Techmakers Lagos, hosted the "Break the Pattern" workshop to equip young Nigerian women with practical tech and AI skills. The programme combined hands-on training, a Buildathone, and leadership sessions, while reinforcing Moniepoint commitment to developing tech talent through initiatives sush as Women in Tech, DreamDevs, HatchDev, and the 3MTT programme.

In 2026, Moniepoint Inc. graduated the second cohort of its DreamDev Bootcamp, a nine-week training programme aimed at addressing African's shortage of software engineering talent. The initiative equips participants with advanced software development skills, mentorship, and hands-on experience to prepare them for enterprise-level engineering roles.
