= Nicolas Borodine =

French footballer (born 1994)

Personal information
- Date of birth: 5 April 1994 (age 32)
- Place of birth: Lyon, France
- Height: 1.78 m (5 ft 10 in)
- Position: Midfielder

Team information
- Current team: Afa FA

Senior career*
Years	Team	Apps	(Gls)
2013–2017	Ajaccio B	81	(2)
2015–2016	Ajaccio	5	(0)
2017–2019	Saint-Priest	21	(0)
2019–2024	Épinal	59	(1)
2024–	Afa FA		
- * Club domestic league appearances and goals

Nicolas Borodine (born 5 April 1994) is a French footballer who plays as a midfielder for Afa FA.

== Career ==
A product of AC Ajaccio's youth system, he made his senior debut on 6 November 2015, coming on as a substitute for Mouaad Madri in the 2–0 win against Bourg-en-Bresse at the Stade François Coty.

== Personal life ==
Born in France, Borodine is of Russian descent through his great-grandfather. His nickname is "Le Kosovar" (The Kosovar), due to his beard.
