= Oluwatosin Olajide Kupoluyi =

Nigerian emcee, actor and entertainer

Oluwatosin Olajide Kupoluyi, known professionally as Xtreme, is a Nigerian compère, master of ceremonies, actor, stand-up comedian, entertainer, producer, and filmmaker. He is the founder of Extreme Entertainment Productions and operates under the umbrella of Extreme Entertainment.

== Early life and background ==
Born in Anthony Village, Lagos, Nigeria, Xtreme is a native of Atakumosa, Ilesa, Osun State. Xtreme had his early education at Sophia International School and Maryland Convent Private School in Lagos then he had his secondary education at Ijebu Ode Grammar School, Ijebu Ode, Ogun State (1999-2005). He then proceeded to Lead City University in 2008-2012, where he studied Politics and Diplomacy.

Following his undergraduate studies, he completed his National Youth Service Corps (NYSC) in Benue State before being redeployed to Ibadan, Oyo State, where he served as a teacher at St. Anne's School. He later earned a Master’s degree in Diplomacy and Strategic Studies from the University of Lagos (2014-2016).

== Career ==
Xtreme's career began in 2006 and has spanned over 18 years, encompassing various forms of entertainment and production, which includes over 1000 weddings, Xtreme LIVE from 2017-2019, Alibaba’s January 1st Concert and Night of a Thousand Laughs.

Xtreme has served as an executive producer and actor on various productions, notable among them are Chronicles of Solo which airs on Africa Magic on DStv and YouTube as well as Adventures of Solo, You & I Series and The Half Sisters Series.

Between 2012 and 2019, Xtreme organised various comedy concerts including Lafftamatics in 2012, Xtreme Live which include, The Funny Flight Edition 2017, MVP Edition in 2018 and Owambe Edition in 2019 in Lagos. In 2021, Xtreme expanded his brand to the United States.

== Filmography ==
- For Old Times’ Sake (Amazon Prime)
- Isoken (Netflix)
