= Tosin Eniolorunda =

Nigerian entrepreneur and engineer (born 1985)

- Born: Oluwatosin Michael Eniolorunda; Lagos, Lagos State, Nigeria
- Education: Obafemi Awolowo University, Lagos Business School
- Occupation: Engineer

Tosin Eniolorunda (born Oluwatosin Michael Eniolorunda; September 1985) is a Nigerian software engineer and entrepreneur who co-founded and is the CEO of the Nigerian fintech bank, Moniepoint Inc. He began his early career with Interswitch as a software engineer before starting TeamApt in 2015.

== Early life and education ==
Eniolorunda was born in Lagos, Nigeria, to Rotimi, an engineering contractor, and Ajoke Eniolorunda, a teacher. He is from Ose local government, Okeluse, Ondo State, but spent his early life in Ibadan, Oyo State. He is the first of three children.

Eniolorunda attended the University of Ibadan Staff School from 1990 to 1995, and then the Command Day School, Odogbo Ibadan, where he received his secondary school education from 1995 to 2001. He was a member of the Junior Engineers, Technicians and Scientists Club there.

He was admitted to Obafemi Awolowo University in 2002, and graduated with a B.Sc. in Mechanical Engineering in 2007.

== Career ==
Eniolorunda joined Interswitch as a software engineer in 2009. At Interswitch, he worked as a senior software manager, unit head of application development, and product manager.

In 2015, Eniolorunda left his role at Interswitch and started TeamApt with Felix Ike, which later rebranded to Moniepoint Inc, a financial technology company that provides business payments and banking solutions. He initially bootstrapped the company with his personal funds.

== Recognition ==
On June 25, 2021, Endeavor announced Eniolorunda and his co-founder at Moniepoint, Felix Ike, as Endeavor Entrepreneurs.

Eniolorunda appeared also on the cover of the August–September edition of Forbes Africa magazine in 2021.

In 2022, he was listed among the 100 most influential Africans by New African magazine.
